= Look Back (2026 film) =

2026 film by Hirokazu Kore-eda

- Theatrical release poster
- Katakana: ルックバック
- Revised Hepburn: Rukku Bakku
- Directed by: Hirokazu Kore-eda
- Screenplay by: Hirokazu Kore-eda
- Based on: Look Back by Tatsuki Fujimoto
- Produced by: Daiju Koide
- Starring: Natsuki Deguchi; Aju Makita; Furi Nanase; Rokka Okada
- Cinematography: Senzo Ueno
- Edited by: Hirokazu Kore-eda
- Music by: Yuta Bandoh
- Production company: K2 Pictures Production
- Distributed by: K2 Pictures
- Release dates: 6 September 2026 (Venice); 11 September 2026 (Japan)
- Running time: 99–100 minutes (Note: Japan's Film Classification and Rating Organization and several sources state the film's runtime as 99 minutes. The Venice Biennale website lists the runtime as 100 minutes.)
- Country: Japan
- Language: Japanese
- Box office: ¥144 million

Look Back (Japanese: ルックバック, Hepburn: Rukku Bakku) is a 2026 Japanese coming-of-age drama film written, directed, and edited by Hirokazu Kore-eda. It adapts the 2021 one-shot manga by Tatsuki Fujimoto, following the 2024 anime film adaptation. The film stars Natsuki Deguchi, Aju Makita, Furi Nanase, and Rokka Okada.

Announced in December 2025, it was shot on 35 mm film, with filming primarily taking place in Fujimoto's hometown of Nikaho, Akita from February to November of the same year. The main cast was revealed in June 2026, and additional cast members were announced the following month. Yuta Bandoh composed the film's soundtrack, which includes performances from Tōko Miura and Kenshi Yonezu.

The film premiered on 6 September 2026 in competition at the 83rd Venice International Film Festival, where it won five collateral awards. It was released in Japan by K2 Pictures on 11 September, grossing over ¥144 million in its first three days.

== Plot ==
The story follows Fujino, a popular and outgoing student, and Kyomoto, a shut-in with severe social anxiety, who bond over their shared love of creating manga. Kyomoto idolizes Fujino for her work drawing manga for their elementary school's newspaper, wishing to befriend her, however Fujino initially resents Kyomoto's natural artistic talents. The pair grow close through their shared love, with the work following their bond as they grow into adulthood.

== Cast ==
- Natsuki Deguchi as Fujino, a popular student who draws yonkoma manga
  - Furi Nanase as young Fujino
- Aju Makita as Kyomoto, a shut-in who draws all the time and is a fan of Fujino's manga
  - Rokka Okada as young Kyomoto
- Masaki Suda as Maeda, an editor for Weekly Shōnen Jump
- Kankurō Kudō as Tamai, a teacher at Fujino and Kyomoto's elementary school
- Kayo Noro as Akari, Fujino's mother
- Ryō Ikeda as Hitoshi, Fujino's father
- Miyu Sasaki as Megumi, Fujino's older sister
- Maho Yamada as Manabe, a teacher at Fujino's junior high school

== Production ==
=== Development ===
In December 2025, it was announced that Tatsuki Fujimoto's 2021 one-shot manga Look Back will be adapted into a live-action film, with Hirokazu Kore-eda serving as the director, screenwriter, and editor. The film is the first live-action adaptation of Fujimoto's works and comes after the manga's 2024 anime film adaptation. Kensei Nakayama was announced as the assistant director and Ryōko Taguchi as the script supervisor. Daiju Koide served as the producer under K2 Pictures Production.

Kore-eda discovered Look Back after seeing its cover at a bookstore at Shinagawa Station and being attracted to "a figure's back". He read the manga in one sitting and "felt the desperate resolve" behind it, adding: "I could feel, almost painfully, that Mr. Fujimoto simply couldn't move forward without creating this piece. For me, Nobody Knows was that kind of work". Koide approached Kore-eda with an offer to adapt the manga into a live-action film. After receiving the offer and meeting Fujimoto, Kore-eda said that he "had no choice but to do it". Kore-eda researched about manga creation by watching documentaries on manga artists and reading material about the process.

=== Casting ===
Natsuki Deguchi and Aju Makita at the 2026 Venice Film Festival

Toshie Tabata and Yōko Yamashita were in charge of casting. In June 2026, it was announced that Natsuki Deguchi and Aju Makita would portray the main characters Fujino and Kyomoto. They had previously co-starred in Kore-eda's Netflix series The Makanai: Cooking for the Maiko House. Furi Nanase and Rokka Okada were also revealed to be portraying the younger versions of Fujino and Kyomoto. Nanase and Okada are real-life classmates, with Kore-eda stating after auditions that they were the only two who could play the roles. The film serves as Nanase's acting debut. In July 2026, Masaki Suda, Kankurō Kudō, Kayo Noro, Ryō Ikeda, Miyu Sasaki, and Maho Yamada joined the cast. Prior to filming, Deguchi, Makita, Nanase and Okada had practiced drawing manga for months (Note: According to Oricon News, Deguchi and Makita practiced for about four months.) and were given weekly assignments by an instructor. Some of their works are shown in the film.

=== Filming and post-production ===
Senzo Ueno served as the cinematographer of Look Back. It was shot on 35 mm Kodak Vision3 film using the Arricam LT and Arriflex 435 cameras and Leitz Summilux-C lenses. Filming primarily took place in Fujimoto's hometown of Nikaho, Akita, and around 300 local residents participated as extras. The winter and spring scenes were shot from February to May 2025; the summer scenes were filmed in July, and the autumn scenes were filmed in November. The Tohoku University of Art and Design in Yamagata also served as a filming location. The film was developed and color-graded at Imagica Entertainment Media Services, and a ScanStation was used to scan in 4K resolution.

The film also utilized rotoscoped animation that was directed by Yōko Kuno and produced by Shin-Ei Animation. Studio Ghibli animator Yōichi Nishikawa handled the background art, and Kazuo Oga and Tatsuya Kushida created paintings that appeared in the film. Look Back was in post-production at the time it was officially announced; in July 2026, the film was reported as being completed with a runtime of 99 minutes.

== Music ==
Yuta Bandoh composed the film's music. It is his first project with Kore-eda and was produced in conjunction with the soundtrack of the latter's film Sheep in the Box (2026). The composition process began prior to filming and took about one and a half years. Bandoh stated that the film crew's images of Nikaho served as inspirations for the music. Participating musicians include guitarists Kyuhee Park, Takuya Okamoto, Gensuke Kanki, and Ohzora Kimishima; the Ensemble FOVE; violinist Kyoko Ogawa; violist Rachel Yui Mikuni; percussionist Shun Ishiwaka; and bassist Marty Holoubek. Nippon Columbia released the soundtrack on 12 September 2026. Tōko Miura served as the vocalist for the track "Beyond the Door", and Kenshi Yonezu provided a guitar performance for one of the film's scenes.

Look Back Original Soundtrack track listing
No.	Title	Length
1.	"[Pencil]" ([えんぴつ], Enpitsu)	0:37
2.	"Sketch: Theme" (featuring Kyuhee Park)	1:14
3.	"Solitude I" (featuring Kyuhee Park)	2:44
4.	"Sketch: Variation I" (featuring Kyuhee Park)	1:41
5.	"Fujino's Diary" (featuring Takuya Okamoto)	1:42
6.	"Detour" (寄り道, Yorimichi; featuring Takuya Okamoto)	1:03
7.	""Look Back" Main Theme" (ルックバック メインテーマ; featuring Kyoko Ogawa and Rachel Yui Mikuni)	2:53
8.	"[Mechanical Pencil]" ([シャーペン], Shāpen)	0:30
9.	"Sketch: Variation II" (featuring Takuya Okamoto and Gensuke Kanki)	0:51
10.	"Camera" (カメラ, Kamera; featuring Jeong Inae and Kyuhee Park)	2:09
11.	"Window" (窓, Mado)	1:28
12.	"[Inking]" ([ペン入れ], Pen-ire)	0:34
13.	"You and I" (ふたり, Futari; featuring Takuya Okamoto)	1:09
14.	"The Moment" (コンビニ, Konbini)	0:46
15.	"Beyond the Door" (町, Machi; featuring Tōko Miura and Ensemble FOVE)	2:56
16.	"The Sea Cities" (海のある町々, Umi no Aru Machimachi; featuring Jeong Inae, Gensuke Kanki, and Marty Holoubek)	3:48
17.	"Shark Kick Waltz" (シャークキック・ワルツ, Shāku Kikku Warutsu)	1:50
18.	"Aquarium" (水族館, Suizokukan)	0:45
19.	"The Mole Boy" (モグラ少年, Mogura Shōnen)	1:52
20.	"[Drawing Tablet]" ([ペンタブ], Pentabu)	0:30
21.	"Solitude II (Spring)" (Solitude II (春/桜), Solitude II (Haru/Sakura))	2:04
22.	"Series" (連載, Rensai)	1:46
23.	"Hiatus" (休載, Kyūsai; featuring Rachel Yui Mikuni)	0:59
24.	"Ghost" (ゆうれい, Yūrei; featuring Kyuhee Park and Kyoko Ogawa)	1:19
25.	"Alone" (ひとり, Hitori; featuring Takuya Okamoto)	2:10
26.	"Drawing" (デッサン, Dessan; featuring Kyoko Ogawa)	2:08
27.	"Her Room" (部屋, Heya; featuring Kyoko Ogawa)	1:26
28.	""Look Back" Main Theme (Orchestra Ver.)" (ルックバック メインテーマ (Orchestra ver.); featuring Ensemble FOVE)	2:18
29.	"Solitude III" (featuring Ensemble FOVE)	1:55
30.	"[Reconnection]" ([再会], Saikai)	0:56
Total length:		48:03

== Marketing ==
Along with the film's announcement, two promotional posters photographed by Hideaki Hamada were released, featuring the two leads with their faces obscured in both and their actresses unidentified. A teaser trailer was unveiled at the Jump Festa 2026 event in December 2025. At the 2026 Marché du Film, the Tokyo International Film Festival presented the film as part of the Tokyo Goes to Cannes showcase. A second trailer and two teaser posters were released in June 2026. The film's main trailer was unveiled the following month along with two additional posters. A clip from the film of Kyomoto and Fujino creating manga was released on 4 September.

== Release ==
Look Back premiered in competition at the 83rd Venice International Film Festival on 6 September 2026. It was simultaneously released in Japan by K2 Pictures and in Taiwan by GaragePlay on 11 September. In Japan, the film was exhibited in 358 theaters and included screenings in the Dolby Cinema and Dolby Atmos formats. GKIDS will begin a limited theatrical release in the United States on 30 December, with a full release starting on 15 January 2027. The film's North American premiere was held at the Toronto International Film Festival on 10 September. It was also screened in competition at the BFI London Film Festival and the Chicago International Film Festival in October 2026. Goodfellas is handling international sales outside of Asia.

== Reception ==
=== Box office ===
In its first three days, Look Back grossed over ¥144 million (US$933,500) from 96,605 admissions, debuting at fifth place in Kōgyō Tsūshinsha's weekend box office rankings.

=== Critical response ===
On the review aggregator website Rotten Tomatoes, 87% of 31 critics' reviews are positive, with rated reviews having an average of 7.2/10. Metacritic, which uses a weighted average, assigned the film a score of 76 out of 100, based on 14 critics, indicating "generally favorable" reviews.

=== Accolades ===
Accolades received by Look Back', showing the names of the awards, dates presented, categories, recipients, and results
Award	Date of ceremony	Category	Recipient(s)	Result	Ref.
Chicago International Film Festival	23 October 2026	Silver Hugo: Best Cinematography	Senzo Ueno	Won	
Hochi Film Awards	December 2026	Best Director	Hirokazu Kore-eda (Note: Also for Sheep in the Box)	Pending	
Hochi Film Awards	December 2026	Best Supporting Actor	Kankurō Kudō (Note: Also for The Brightest Sun)	Pending	
Montclair Film Festival	26 October 2026	Special Jury Prize for Excellence in Cinematography	Senzo Ueno	Won	
Nikkan Sports Film Awards	27 December 2026	Best Supporting Actor	Kankurō Kudō	Pending	
Tama Film Awards	28 November 2026	Best New Actress	Natsuki Deguchi (Note: Also for All Greens and Till We Meet Again on the Starry Hill)	Won	
Venice Film Festival	12 September 2026	Golden Lion	Hirokazu Kore-eda	Nominated	
Venice Film Festival	12 September 2026	Fanheart3 Award – Special Mention	Hirokazu Kore-eda	Won	
Venice Film Festival	11 September 2026	Cinema & Arts Award	Hirokazu Kore-eda	Won	
Venice Film Festival	11 September 2026	CinemaSarà Award	Hirokazu Kore-eda	Won	
Venice Film Festival	11 September 2026	SIGNIS Award	Hirokazu Kore-eda	Won	
Venice Film Festival	11 September 2026	UNIMED Award	Hirokazu Kore-eda	Won	
