= Kiyo in Kyoto =

Japanese manga series

- Kiyo in Kyoto: From the Maiko House
- First tankōbon volume cover, featuring Kiyo

舞妓さんちのまかないさん (Maiko-san chi no Makanai-san)
- Genre: Cooking; Iyashikei
- Manga
- Written by: Aiko Koyama
- Published by: Shogakukan
- Imprint: Shōnen Sunday Comics Special
- Magazine: Weekly Shōnen Sunday
- Original run: December 28, 2016 – January 22, 2025
- Volumes: 30
- Anime television series
- Directed by: Yōhei Suzuki
- Written by: Susumu Yamakawa
- Music by: Go Sakabe
- Studio: J.C.Staff
- Licensed by: Crunchyroll
- Original network: NHK World, NHK E
- Original run: February 25, 2021 – January 27, 2022
- Episodes: 12
- Live-action series
- The Makanai: Cooking for the Maiko House (2023)
- icon

Kiyo in Kyoto: From the Maiko House (Note: Japanese: 舞妓さんちのまかないさん, Hepburn: Maiko-san chi no Makanai-san; lit. "Makanai in the Maiko Lodge" (Note: Makanai is a Japanese culinary term which means a meal provided to staff rather than the customers.)) is a Japanese manga series written and illustrated by Aiko Koyama. It was serialized in Shogakukan's shōnen manga magazine Weekly Shōnen Sunday from December 2016 to January 2025, with its chapters collected in 30 tankōbon volumes. The series takes place in the Geisha district in Kyoto and follows the titular character Kiyo as she cooks up delicacies every day to support her friend Sumire and the other maiko.

An anime television series adaptation by J.C.Staff aired worldwide from February 2021 to January 2022 on NHK World, and it was followed by a Japanese broadcast on NHK E from October 2021 to June 2022. A live-action series titled in English as The Makanai: Cooking for the Maiko House, executive produced, written and directed by Hirokazu Kore-eda for Netflix, premiered in January 2023.

By September 2022, the manga had over 2.7 million copies in circulation. In 2020, Kiyo in Kyoto won the 65th Shogakukan Manga Award for the shōnen category.

== Synopsis ==
Kiyo and Sumire are childhood friends from Aomori Prefecture who move to Kyoto to become maiko. During their training, Sumire excels through her talent and diligence. Kiyo, meanwhile, has difficulty learning the basic skills and is eventually expelled. However, Kiyo's talent in cooking is discovered, and she is hired as the new cook of the maiko house. Kiyo is happy with her new role: supporting Sumire and the other maiko through her cooking.

== Characters ==
Kiyo Nozuki (野月キヨ, Nozuki Kiyo)
Voiced by: Kana Hanazawa
Portrayed by: Nana Mori
A 16 year-old girl from Aomori who came to Kyoto to become a maiko, but her teachers thought she was too clumsy. However, the other apprentices loved her cooking, so she now works at the maiko house as a live-in cook.
Sumire Herai (戸来すみれ, Herai Sumire) / Momohana (百はな)
Voiced by: M.A.O
Portrayed by: Natsuki Deguchi
Kiyo's childhood friend from Aomori who came to Kyoto with her. Unlike Kiyo, Sumire has talent at being a maiko, earning praise from the geisha overseeing her training.
Kenta Nakanowatari (中渡健太, Nakanowatari Kenta)
Voiced by: Minami Takayama
Kiyo and Sumire's childhood friend who goes to a high school in Aomori. Following his baseball injury, he moved to Kyoto and became an apprentice chef.
Tsurukoma (つる駒)
Voiced by: Satsumi Matsuda
A senior maiko who lives in the maiko house where Kiyo works. Later on, she became a geiko.
Okā-san (おかあさん)
Voiced by: Kaoru Katakai
The "mother" of the maiko house. She is responsible for all of the maiko and geisha's living arrangements and for their training and preparation. It is later revealed that her real name is Hirose Azusa and she hails from Kanagawa. Her maiko / geiko name is Chikako. She retired from geiko duties following her inheriting leadership of the maiko house.
Big Brother (おにいさん, Onī-san)
Voiced by: Rikiya Koyama
An assistant of the maiko house. He is responsible for dressing the geisha and maiko in their kimonos.
Narration (ナレーション, Narēshon)
Voiced by: Sayaka Ohara (Japanese); Hannah Grace (NHK World broadcast) (English)
Provides tidbits of information on maiko culture and lifestyle.

== Media ==
=== Manga ===
Written and illustrated by Aiko Koyama, Kiyo in Kyoto: From the Maiko House was serialized in Shogakukan's shōnen manga magazine Weekly Shōnen Sunday from December 28, 2016, to January 22, 2025. Shogakukan has collected its chapters in 30 tankōbon volumes, released from April 12, 2017, to June 12, 2025.

==== Volumes ====
No.	Japanese release date	Japanese ISBN
1	April 12, 2017	978-4-09-127562-2
2	July 18, 2017	978-4-09-127726-8
3	September 12, 2017	978-4-09-127828-9
4	December 12, 2017	978-4-09-128028-2
5	April 12, 2018	978-4-09-128188-3
6	June 12, 2018	978-4-09-128329-0
7	September 12, 2018	978-4-09-128537-9
8	December 12, 2018	978-4-09-128752-6
9	March 12, 2019	978-4-09-128883-7
10	June 12, 2019	978-4-09-129258-2
11	September 12, 2019	978-4-09-129389-3
12	December 12, 2019	978-4-09-129489-0
13	March 12, 2020	978-4-09-850088-8
14	July 10, 2020	978-4-09-850129-8
15	November 12, 2020	978-4-09-850316-2
16	March 12, 2021	978-4-09-850489-3
17	July 12, 2021	978-4-09-850684-2
18	October 12, 2021	978-4-09-850801-3
19	February 10, 2022	978-4-09-851010-8
20	July 12, 2022	978-4-09-851209-6
21	October 12, 2022	978-4-09-851362-8
22	January 12, 2023	978-4-09-851584-4
23	May 12, 2023	978-4-09-852131-9
24	September 12, 2023	978-4-09-852847-9
25	January 12, 2024	978-4-09-853143-1
26	May 10, 2024	978-4-09-853405-0
27	September 11, 2024	978-4-09-853568-2
28	December 12, 2024	978-4-09-853737-2
29	March 12, 2025	978-4-09-854001-3
30	June 12, 2025	978-4-09-854123-2

=== Anime ===
In March 2020, NHK announced that the series would be adapted into an anime television series. The series is animated by J.C.Staff, and directed by Yōhei Suzuki, with Susumu Yamakawa overseeing scripts, and Go Sakabe composing the series' music. It aired worldwide on the NHK World-Japan channel from February 25, 2021, to January 27, 2022, and it was followed by a Japanese broadcast on NHK E from October 2, 2021, to June 11, 2022. The opening theme song is "Ashita Kitto" by Ayano Tsuji.

In addition to each episode being on NHK World-Japan's free on-demand service for a year after broadcast, Crunchyroll is also streaming the series with English subtitles outside of Asia. The series ran for 12 episodes. Each episode features a "Dish of the Day" segment, in which Kiyo, Sumire, and Tsurukoma discuss the dishes that appeared in each episode's three segments.

==== Episodes ====
No.	Title (Note: English titles are taken from Crunchyroll.)	Directed by (Note: Information is taken from the ending credits of each episode.)	Written by	Original release date
1	"Kiyo and Sumire"; Transliteration: "Kiyo-chan to Sū-chan" (Japanese: キヨちゃんとすーちゃん)	Yōhei Suzuki	Susumu Yamakawa	February 25, 2021
1	"Menu for a Special Day"; Transliteration: "Tokubetsu na Hi no Tame no Gohan" (Japanese: 特別な日のためのごはん)	Yōhei Suzuki	Susumu Yamakawa	February 25, 2021
1	"Secret Supper Plan"; Transliteration: "Hisaku no Gohan" (Japanese: 秘策のごはん)	Yōhei Suzuki	Susumu Yamakawa	February 25, 2021
Kiyo works at the Maiko House as the live-in cook. She sees her childhood friend Sumire in town one day, accompanying older maiko. Back at the House kitchen, Sumire tells Kiyo how hard she is working towards her goal of becoming one, too. Sumire is overjoyed to learn that she will debut as a maiko later that evening. She runs straight to Kiyo to share her news, and Kiyo is similarly overjoyed. In the second segment, Kiyo cooks a lot of dishes to celebrate Sumire's achievement. In the third segment, the audience is introduced to the Otokoshi known as Onii-san. Onii-san helped Kiyo retrieving books that is fallen behind the fridge. Dish of the day: pudding a la mode, nutrient-packed foods, squid mince
2	"For Sleepless Nights"; Transliteration: "Nemurenai Yoru no Tame ni" (Japanese: 眠れない夜のために)	Yōhei Suzuki	Susumu Yamakawa	March 25, 2021
2	"Some Things Will Always Be"; Transliteration: "Zutto Kimatte Iru Mono" (Japanese: ずっと決まっているもの)	Yōhei Suzuki	Susumu Yamakawa	March 25, 2021
2	"Snowy Day Reminiscence"; Transliteration: "Onaji Yuki o Mite Iru" (Japanese: 同じ雪を見ている)	Yōhei Suzuki	Susumu Yamakawa	March 25, 2021
Sumire is going to have her hair styled in the traditional maiko bun for the first time. She will start using a special pillow to protect her hairstyle while she sleeps, like the other maiko and senior apprentices with buns. The senior maiko warn her she won't be able to sleep the first night, and Sumire struggles to rest her head on the unfamiliar pillow. She finally gives up on sleep and goes to the kitchen, where she unexpectedly finds Kiyo waiting up for her. Dish of the day: amazake, hotcakes, hittsumi soup
3	"Kiyo Arrives in Kyoto Part 1"; Transliteration: "Kiyo-chan Jōkyō su (Zenpen)" (Japanese: キヨちゃん上京す(前編))	Yōhei Suzuki	Susumu Yamakawa	April 22, 2021
3	"Kiyo Arrives in Kyoto Part 2"; Transliteration: "Kiyo-chan Jōkyō su (Kōhen)" (Japanese: キヨちゃん上京す(後編))	Yōhei Suzuki	Susumu Yamakawa	April 22, 2021
3	"An Apprentice Maiko's Morning"; Transliteration: "Shikomi-san no Asa" (Japanese: 仕込みさんの朝)	Yōhei Suzuki	Susumu Yamakawa	April 22, 2021
About a year ago, in Aomori Prefecture. Kiyo is spending time with her grandma while getting ready for her and Sumire's departure to Kyoto that evening. Later, Kiyo, Sumire and Kenta have fun reminiscing about their childhood, and Kiyo's grandma serves them a specialty dish from the region to celebrate. Just before boarding the night bus, Sumire discovers what Kiyo has packed from home. During maiko training, Kiyo lacks concentration and focus, and is eventually dismissed. However, the resident cook becomes unwell and Kiyo cooks a meal for Tsurukoma and the other maiko, starting her career at the maiko house. Dish of the day: miso kayaki, oyakodon, tonkatsu sandwich (cut for maiko)
4	"What I Want to Eat"; Transliteration: "Watashi no Tabetai Mono" (Japanese: 私の食べたいもの)	Yōhei Suzuki	Susumu Yamakawa	May 27, 2021
4	"A Senior Apprentice's Evening"; Transliteration: "Minarai-san no Yoru" (Japanese: 見習いさんの夜)	Yōhei Suzuki	Susumu Yamakawa	May 27, 2021
4	"Debut Day"; Transliteration: "Misedashi no Ichinichi" (Japanese: 店出しのいちにち)	Yōhei Suzuki	Susumu Yamakawa	May 27, 2021
Kiyo is having trouble deciding what to cook for supper. She asks the maiko what they want to eat, but they all like different dishes. Sumire's favorite is fried chicken. Her craving grows so strong that it is all she can think about while entertaining customers over dinner, and on her way home. When she finally arrives back at the Maiko House, she is greeted by Kiyo, who is preparing a fried chicken dish for her. In the second segment, Sumire prays at the temple a bit too long. In the third segment, Sumire's debut as Momohana has arrived. Kiyo served her a bowl of nabekko dumplings. Dish of the day: chicken karaage, sugar cookies, nabekko dumplings
5	"A Day in Kiyo's Life"; Transliteration: "Kiyo-chan no Ichinichi" (Japanese: キヨちゃんの一日)	Yōhei Suzuki	Susumu Yamakawa	June 24, 2021
5	"Homemade Curry"; Transliteration: "Ouchi no Karē" (Japanese: おうちのカレー)	Yōhei Suzuki	Susumu Yamakawa	June 24, 2021
5	"Snowy Morning"; Transliteration: "Yuki no Hi no Asa" (Japanese: 雪の日の朝)	Yōhei Suzuki	Susumu Yamakawa	June 24, 2021
Kiyo's day revolves around cooking and nourishing the maiko. In the morning, she gets ready quietly so as not to disturb the sleeping maiko, makes breakfast and goes grocery shopping after seeing the maiko off. Mid-day, she prepares lunch for the maiko who have returned from lessons, preps ingredients and serves supper to the maiko before they leave for entertaining. At evening time, Kiyo cleans up before going to the public bath and takes a stroll enjoying Kyoto at night. In the second segment, Kiyo makes curry rice at the retired cook's house, since curry is forbidden in maiko house. Dish of the day: rice ball, curry rice, types of fulfilling soups across Japan
6	"Waiting for a Letter"; Transliteration: "Otayori o Matsu Hito" (Japanese: おたよりを待つひと)	Yōhei Suzuki	Susumu Yamakawa	July 22, 2021
6	"Christmas in Kagai"; Transliteration: "Kagai no Kurisumasu" (Japanese: 花街のクリスマス)	Yōhei Suzuki	Susumu Yamakawa	July 22, 2021
6	"New Year's Eve in Kagai"; Transliteration: "Kagai no Ōmisoka" (Japanese: 花街の大みそか)	Yōhei Suzuki	Susumu Yamakawa	July 22, 2021
In Aomori Prefecture. Kenta pays a visit to Kiyo's Grandma's and notices that she has received a letter in her mailbox. When Kenta realizes it is from Kiyo, he remembers how she and Sumire secretly exchanged notes in school. It was then that something about Kiyo's handwriting had started catching his attention. Dish of the day: grilled onigiri, fruits sandwich, Kyoto-style ozoni
7	"First Day Home"; Transliteration: "Kikyō Ichinichime" (Japanese: 帰郷1日目)	Yōhei Suzuki	Susumu Yamakawa	August 26, 2021
7	"New Year's Shrine Visit"; Transliteration: "Hatsumōde e" (Japanese: 初詣へ)	Yōhei Suzuki	Susumu Yamakawa	August 26, 2021
7	"Back to Kyoto"; Transliteration: "Futatabi Kyōto e" (Japanese: 再び京都へ)	Yōhei Suzuki	Susumu Yamakawa	August 26, 2021
Kiyo has come home to Aomori Prefecture to spend New Year's with her grandma. Sumire and Kenta come to visit, and the three of them chat while making the hometown specialty walnut sauce for Ozoni soup. When Kiyo, Sumire and the maiko girls finally gather together back in Kyoto, they are given a day off, which is spent by eat fast food meals in front of the river. Dish of the day: ozoni with walnut sauce, local speciality breads, fast food
8	"First Day of Work"; Transliteration: "Shigoto Hajime no Hi" (Japanese: 仕事始めの日)	Yōhei Suzuki	Susumu Yamakawa	September 23, 2021
8	"Opening Ceremony"; Transliteration: "Shigyōshiki" (Japanese: 始業式)	Yōhei Suzuki	Susumu Yamakawa	September 23, 2021
8	"White Dove"; Transliteration: "Shiroi Hato" (Japanese: 白いハト)	Yōhei Suzuki	Susumu Yamakawa	September 23, 2021
January 7 is the first workday of the new year in Kagai. The Maiko House girls are rushing about, preparing for the beginning of work. Sumire has her hair put up, gives Mother a personal New Year's greeting, and gets dressed in a formal black crested kimono worn on celebratory occasions. In the kitchen, Kiyo prepares a special breakfast for this important day, but the maiko must take particular care when eating it. Dish of the day: spaghetti with meat sauce, croque madame, kakimochi crackers
9	"Something Warm for Lunch"; Transliteration: "Attakai Ohiru" (Japanese: あったかいお昼)	Yōhei Suzuki	Susumu Yamakawa	October 28, 2021
9	"When You Have a Cold..."; Transliteration: "Kaze no Hi wa..." (Japanese: 風邪の日は...)	Yōhei Suzuki	Susumu Yamakawa	October 28, 2021
9	"Making Greeting Rounds"; Transliteration: "Go Aisatsu Mawari" (Japanese: ご挨拶回り)	Yōhei Suzuki	Susumu Yamakawa	October 28, 2021
Mother brings home some premium beef. Kiyo immediately starts thinking about what she can make with it, but the maiko who have returned home are realizing that the house is unusually cold. None of the heating appliances could be turned on due to a blackout. As the maiko sit shivering in the cold, what better than Kiyo appearing in front of them with a steaming hot pot. Dish of the day: shabu-shabu, Kyoto-style udon, donuts
10	"Night for Extra Effort"; Transliteration: "Mō Hito Ganbari no Yoru" (Japanese: もうひとがんばりの夜)	Yōhei Suzuki	Susumu Yamakawa	November 25, 2021
10	"Bean Throwing for Everyone"; Transliteration: "Mamemaki Hyakkei" (Japanese: 豆まき百景)	Yōhei Suzuki	Susumu Yamakawa	November 25, 2021
10	"A Refreshing Drink"; Transliteration: "Okibari no Nomimono" (Japanese: お気張りの飲みもの)	Yōhei Suzuki	Susumu Yamakawa	November 25, 2021
It is customary for Geiko to dress up in costumes for the Setsubun festival in Kagai. The House maiko are up late, helping make the props and costumes. The girls are sleep-deprived, and they start to come apart in the room where they've been working together, as the night wears on. Can Sumire find something in the kitchen to help calm everyone down. Dish of the day: hot dogs, ozoni with peanut sauce, lemonade
11	"A Meal Request"; Transliteration: "Onegai Gohan" (Japanese: おねがいごはん)	Yōhei Suzuki	Susumu Yamakawa	December 23, 2021
11	"Maiko Sisters Giving Their All"; Transliteration: "Hisshi na Imōto to, Sono Ane" (Japanese: 必死な妹と、その姉)	Yōhei Suzuki	Susumu Yamakawa	December 23, 2021
11	"Kiyo, Same as Always"; Transliteration: "Kiyo-chan wa Itsumodōri" (Japanese: キヨちゃんはいつも通り)	Yōhei Suzuki	Susumu Yamakawa	December 23, 2021
Sumire dines out at a high-end restaurant along with Momoko and a regular customer but cannot make any sense of the menu. Sumire ends up having the same meal as Momoko but is left wondering what she actually ate. The next morning, she goes to Kiyo in the house kitchen and makes a request for the dish she had wanted to eat. Dish of the day: chicken and macaroni gratin, bento, miso pork soup
12	"Dumplings for a Day Off"; Transliteration: "Oyasumi Gyōza" (Japanese: お休みギョウザ)	Yōhei Suzuki	Susumu Yamakawa	January 27, 2022
12	"Sumire's Day Off (Part One)"; Transliteration: "Sū-chan Oyasumi no Hi (Zenpen)" (Japanese: すーちゃんお休みの日(前編))	Yōhei Suzuki	Susumu Yamakawa	January 27, 2022
12	"Sumire's Day Off (Part Two)"; Transliteration: "Sū-chan Oyasumi no Hi (Kōhen)" (Japanese: すーちゃんお休みの日(後編))	Yōhei Suzuki	Susumu Yamakawa	January 27, 2022
The maiko spot garlic in the kitchen and it causes quite a stir among them. As entertainers, maiko typically refrain from eating anything that smells too strongly and can only enjoy having such foods when they have the next day off. The garlic is for Sumire's gyoza dumplings. She is looking forward to them so much that she blurts out some puzzling words while she entertains customers the night before her day off. Dish of the day: gyoza, ice cream, scotch eggs

=== Drama ===
In January 2022, it was announced that a nine-episode drama adaptation, titled in English as The Makanai: Cooking for the Maiko House, would premiere worldwide on Netflix in 2023. It was directed by Hirokazu Kore-eda, Megumi Tsuno, Hiroshi Okuyama and Takuma Sato, with Genki Kawamura in charge of planning; screenplay by Kore-eda, Tsuna, Okuyama, Sato and Mami Sunada; Yoshihiro Furusawa and Naomi Sato serving as executive producers; Kenji Yamada, Ai Kashima and Eiji Kitahara produced the series; Risa Kitabayashi served as an associate producer; and the music was composed by Yoko Kanno. It premiered on Netflix on January 12, 2023.

== Reception ==
Kiyo in Kyoto won the 65th Shogakukan Manga Award for the shōnen category in 2020.

By October 2019, the manga had 700,000 copies in circulation; over 1 million copies in circulation by March 2020; and over 2.7 million copies in circulation by of September 2022.
