= Mizuki Yoshida =

Japanese actress (born 2003)

- 吉田 美月喜
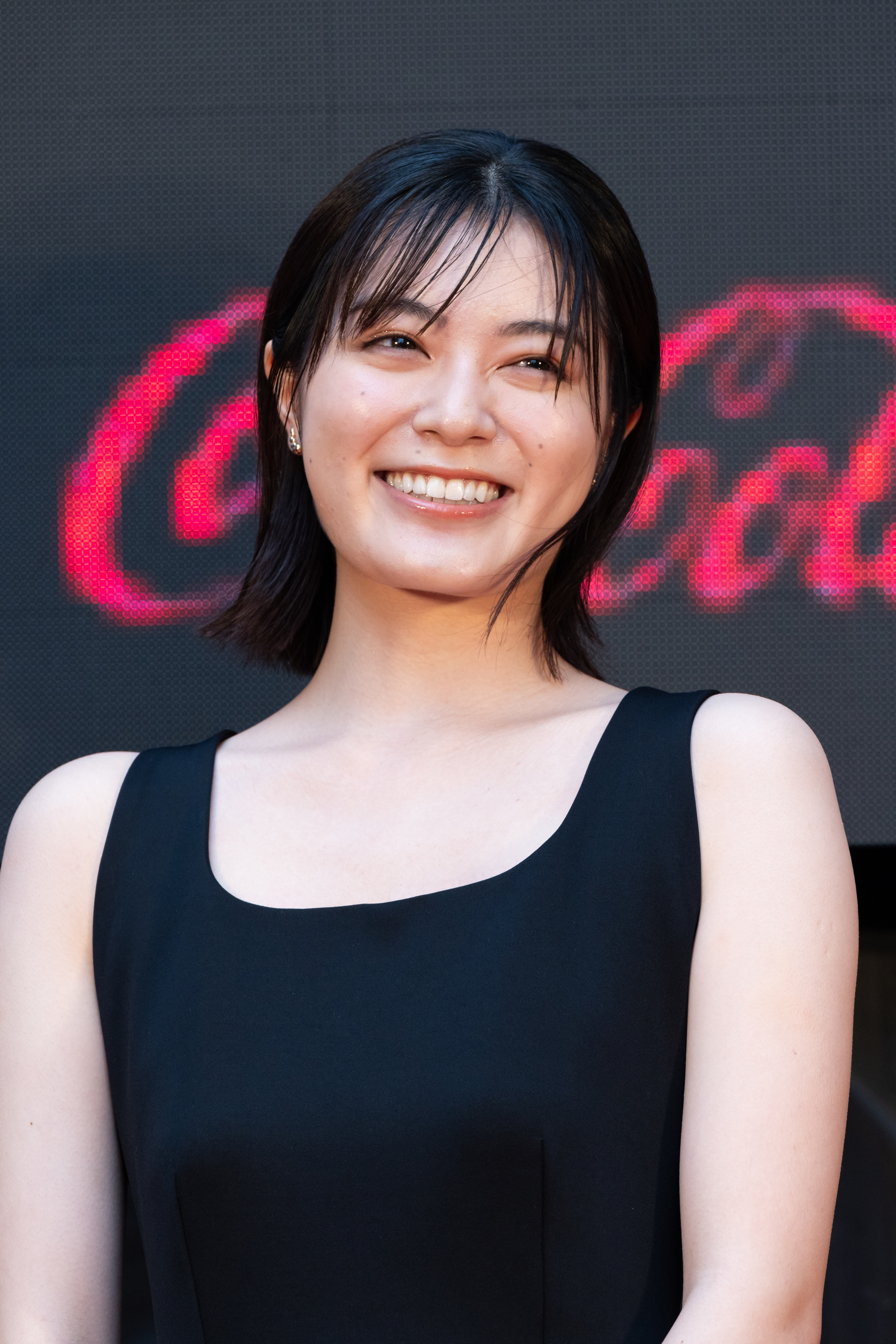
- Yoshida at the 37th Tokyo International Film Festival in October 2024
- Born: March 10, 2003 (age 23); Tokyo, Japan
- Occupation: Actress
- Years active: 2018–present
- Agent: Stardust Promotion

Mizuki Yoshida (吉田 美月喜, Yoshida Mizuki; born March 10, 2003 in Tokyo) is a Japanese actress.

== Career ==
In 2017 she was scouted as an actress until making her debut in November 2018 on As a Crow, I Looked Down at the World Below. In June 2019, she made her movie debut in Machida-kun's World.

In early 2020, she appeared in two drama series called The World is Neither Black Nor White, and the Panda Laughs and Job Hunting Diaries marking her first time appearing in two dramas in the same season. In the following year she was in two hit dramas, Dragon Zakura Season 2 and Nemesis.

In February 2024, she took on her first lead role in a serialized drama with My Strawberry Film. From June to July she starred in the stage play. At the same time she announced that she would be debuting as a voice actress by providing her voice in an anime film Look Back with Yuumi Kawai.

== Filmography ==
=== Film ===
| Year | Title | Role | Notes | Ref. |
|---|---|---|---|---|
| 2019 | Almost a Miracle | Classmate | | |
| 2021 | Demon Girl | Usami Yuki | | |
| 2021 | Tabun | Eguchi | Lead role | |
| 2022 | Mirrorliar Films | Haruno | Lead role; Petto segment | |
| 2022 | Mayhem Girl | Yamazaki Mizuho | Lead role | |
| 2023 | The Lump in My Heart | Muto Chinatsu | Lead role | |
| 2023 | Another Day in Paradise | Yuki Yamashita | | |
| 2024 | Songs of Kamui | Kitazato Teru | Lead role | |
| 2024 | Look Back | Kyomoto (voice) | Lead role | |
| 2026 | Karateka | | Spanish film | |
| 2026 | All Greens | Mako Iwakuma | | |

=== Television ===
| Year | Title | Role | Notes | Ref. |
|---|---|---|---|---|
| 2020 | We Don't Swim | Fujisawa Yuri | Lead role | |
| 2020 | Alice in Borderland | Asahi | | |
| 2020 | Panda Judges the World | Higashiyama Kaede | | |
| 2020 | Job Hunting Diaries | Yamaguchi Saya | Lead role; episode 3 | |
| 2021 | Dragon Sakura | Seino Rie | Season 2 | |
| 2021 | Nemesis | Nishino Ayumi | Episode 4 | |
| 2022 | ZIP! Morning Drama: Before Goodbye | Watarai Kyoko | | |
| 2022 | Numaru. Minato-ku High School Girls | Saito Marika | | |
| 2023 | Crime Family | Sasaki Yume | | |
| 2024 | My Strawberry Film | Nakamura Chika | Lead role | |
| 2026 | Water Margin | Yan Poxi | | |
| 2027 | Mawaru Swan | Haruna Ito | Asadora | |
