= Hirokazu Kore-eda =

Japanese film-maker (born 1962)

- 是枝 裕和
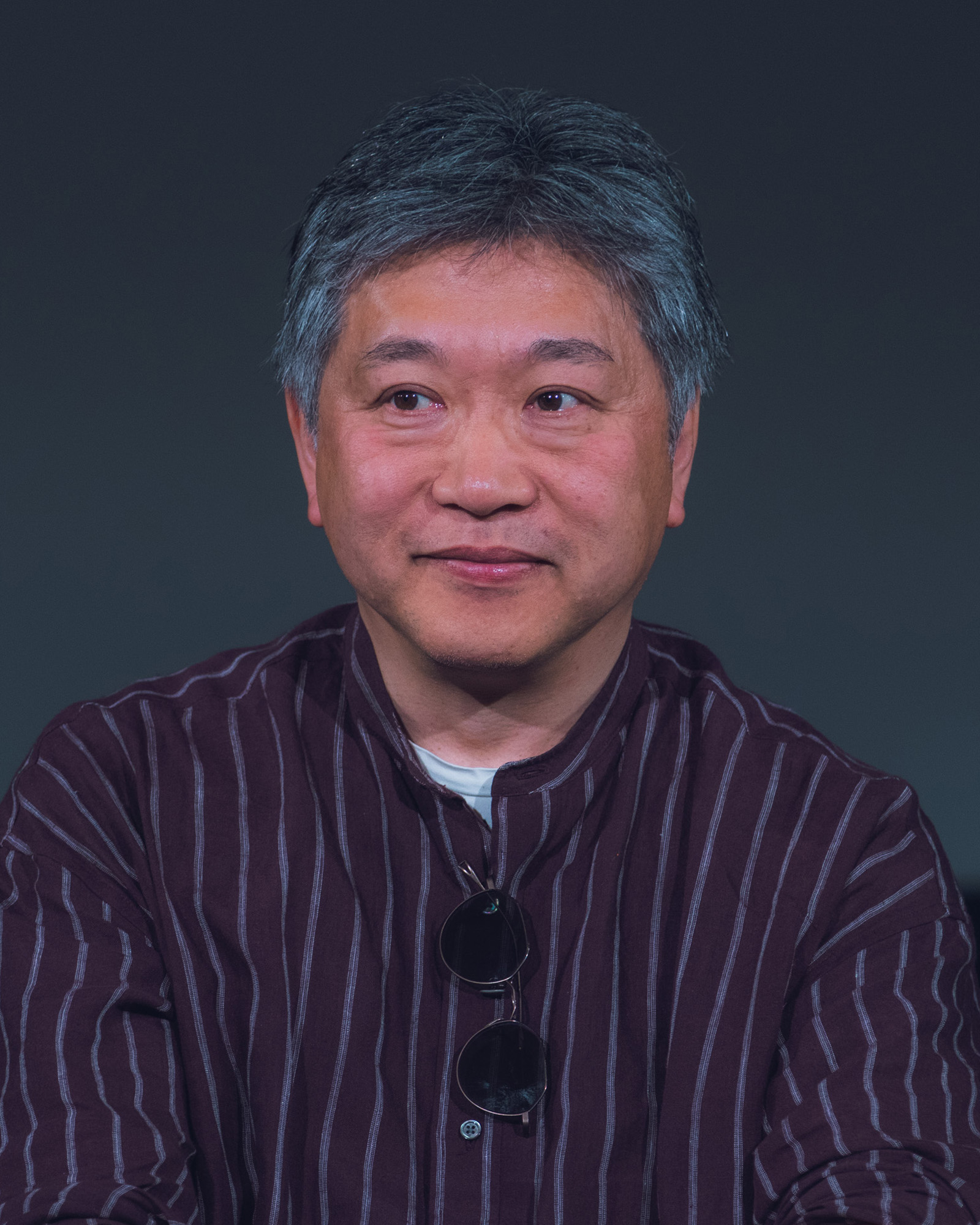
- Kore-eda in 2025
- Born: 6 June 1962 (age 64); Tokyo, Japan
- Education: Waseda University
- Occupations: Film director, film producer, screenwriter, film editor
- Years active: 1991–present
- Children: 1

Japanese name
- Hiragana: これえだ ひろかず
Transcriptions
- Romanization: Koreeda Hirokazu
- Website: kore-eda.com

Hirokazu Kore-eda (是枝 裕和, Koreeda Hirokazu; born 6 June 1962) is a Japanese filmmaker. He rose to prominence with his drama films Nobody Knows (2004), Still Walking (2008) and Like Father, Like Son (2013), for the latter he won the Jury Prize at the 66th Cannes Film Festival.

His drama film Shoplifters (2018) won the Palme d'Or at the 71st Cannes Film Festival, and was also nominated for the Academy Award for Best Foreign Language Film representing Japan. He has since directed Broker (2022) and Monster (2023), to critical acclaim.

== Early life and education ==
Kore-eda's father was born in Taiwan. Kore-eda's paternal grandparents could not marry under Japanese law at the time as they had the same last name, so they had eloped to Taiwan, then under Japanese colonial rule, where they could marry. Kore-eda has cited this as a reason for his affinity toward Taiwan.

Kore-eda's father was conscripted into the Japanese military during World War II and detained in Siberia for three years after the end of the war.

Hirokazu Kore-eda was born on 6 June 1962 in Nerima, Tokyo. He is the youngest of three children. From an early age, Kore-eda watched movies with his mother. He said through an interpreter, "My mother loved films! She adored Ingrid Bergman, Joan Fontaine, Vivien Leigh! We couldn't afford to go together to the cinema, but she was always watching their movies on TV. She stopped all family business or discussions to watch these movies. We would watch together. So I adored film—like her."

After seeing Japan win the gold medal in men's volleyball at the 1972 Munich Olympics, he started playing in middle school. He rose to team captain in high school as a setter.

He initially failed his entrance exams, but was accepted into Waseda University a year later. He graduated from Waseda University's Graduate School of Letters, Arts and Sciences in 1987.

== Career ==
Before becoming a director, Kore-eda worked as an assistant director on television documentaries. He directed his first television documentary, Lessons from a Calf, in 1991. He directed several other documentary films thereafter.

Kore-eda's 1994 documentary August without Him depicts his friendship with Hirata Yutaka, who had HIV/AIDS. Filmed between 1992 and 1994, it depicts Yutaka activism as the first Japanese person to publicly admit having contracted the disease as a homosexual. The film ends with his condition having deteriorated. Yutaka died of AIDS complications on 29 May 1994.

Kore-eda's first fiction feature film, Maborosi (1995), premiered at the 52nd Venice International Film Festival. It won the Golden Osella for Best Cinematography. At the first Buenos Aires International Festival of Independent Cinema in 1999, he won awards for Best Film and Best Screenplay for his film After Life.

In 2005, Kore-eda won the Blue Ribbon Awards for Best Film and Best Director for his film Nobody Knows. His 2008 film Still Walking also earned accolades, including Best Director at the 2009 Asian Film Awards and the Golden Ástor for Best Film at the 2008 Mar del Plata International Film Festival.

Kore-eda's 2013 film Like Father, Like Son premiered and was nominated for the Palme d'Or at the 2013 Cannes Film Festival. It did not win, but it won the Jury Prize and a commendation from the Ecumenical Jury. In October 2013, the film won the Rogers People's Choice Award at the 2013 Vancouver International Film Festival.

Kore-eda's 2015 film Our Little Sister was selected to compete for the Palme d'Or at the 2015 Cannes Film Festival. His 2016 film After the Storm debuted to critical acclaim at the 2016 Cannes Film Festival in the Un Certain Regard category. For his work on it, Kore-eda won Best Director at the Yokohama Film Festival. He won Best Film and Best Director at the Japan Academy Prizes for his 2017 film The Third Murder, which also screened in the main competition of the 74th Venice International Film Festival.

In 2018, his film Shoplifters, about a young girl welcomed in by a family of shoplifters, premiered and won the Palme d'Or at the Cannes Film Festival. It was also nominated for the Academy Award for Best Foreign Language Film.

In 2018, he won the Donostia Award for his life-time achievement at San Sebastián International Film Festival.

In 2019, Kore-eda directed The Truth, starring Catherine Deneuve, Juliette Binoche and Ethan Hawke. It is his first film shot in Europe and not in Japanese.

In 2021, Kore-eda directed Broker. The film was shot in South Korea, featuring a predominantly South Korean cast and crew. It was first released on 8 June 2022. The film was selected to compete for the Palme d'Or at the Cannes Film Festival in 2022 and won the Prize of the Ecumenical Jury.

In January 2022, it was announced that Kore-eda would be working with a team of directors including Megumi Tsuno, Hiroshi Okuyama, and Takuma Sato on a nine-episode series, The Makanai: Cooking for the Maiko House, adapted from the manga Kiyo in Kyoto.

In November 2022, Kore-eda disclosed that he had completed shooting his next Japanese film, Monster. With post-production underway, Monster was scheduled for release in Japan on 2 June 2023. This release date positioned the film for a potential world premiere in May at Cannes. It won the Queer Palm and the Best Screenplay Award at the 2023 Cannes Film Festival. In 2025, Netflix released Kore-eda's T.V. series Asura. It is based on Kuniko Mukōda's novel of the same name.

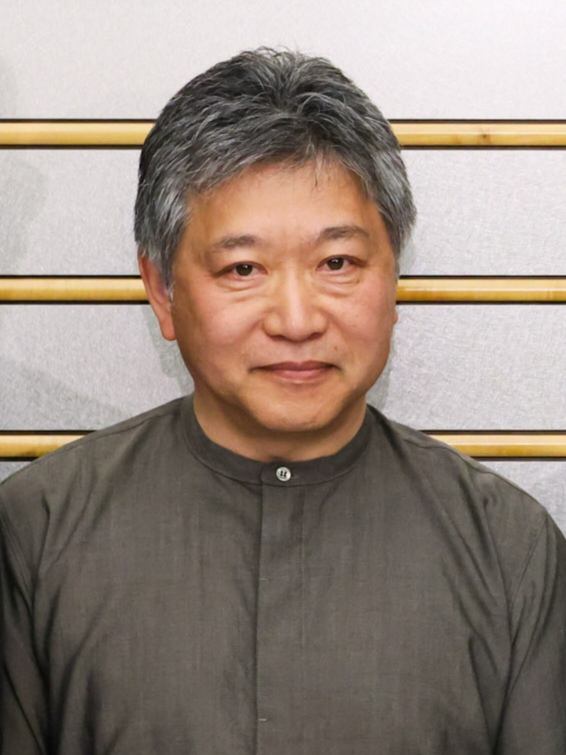
Kore-eda in 2025

In 2026, Kore-eda first science fiction film Sheep in the Box had its world premiere at the 2026 Cannes Film Festival, where it competed for the Palme d'Or. His following film will be the live-action adaptation Look Back, based on the 2021 one-shot manga by Tatsuki Fujimoto, which will have its world premiere at the 83rd Venice International Film Festival, where it will compete for the Golden Lion.

=== Style and influences ===
According to the Harvard Film Archive, Kore-eda's works "reflect the contemplative style and pacing of such luminaries as Hou Hsiao-hsien and Tsai Ming-liang". Kore-eda is often compared to Yasujirō Ozu, but has said he feels more influenced by Ken Loach and Mikio Naruse.

== Personal life ==
Kore-eda married in 2002 and has a daughter, born in 2007.

In a 2009 interview, Kore-eda said that Still Walking is based on his own family.

== Filmography ==
=== Feature films ===
Year	English Title	Original Title	Credited as			Notes
Year	English Title	Original Title	Director	Writer	Editor	Notes
1995	Maborosi	幻の光	Yes	No	No	
1998	After Life	ワンダフルライフ	Yes	Yes	Yes	
2001	Distance	DISTANCE ディスタンス	Yes	Yes	Yes	
2004	Nobody Knows	誰も知らない	Yes	Yes	Yes	Also producer
2006	Hana	花よりもなほ	Yes	Yes	Yes	
2008	Still Walking	歩いても 歩いても	Yes	Yes	Yes	
2009	Air Doll	空気人形	Yes	Yes	Yes	Also producer
2011	I Wish	奇跡	Yes	Yes	Yes	
2013	Like Father, Like Son	そして父になる	Yes	Yes	Yes	
2015	Our Little Sister	海街diary	Yes	Yes	Yes	
2016	After the Storm	海よりもまだ深く	Yes	Yes	Yes	
2017	The Third Murder	三度目の殺人	Yes	Yes	Yes	
2018	Shoplifters	万引き家族	Yes	Yes	Yes	Also producer
2019	The Truth	La Vérité	Yes	Yes	Yes	French-language debut
2022	Broker	브로커	Yes	Yes	Yes	Korean-language debut
2023	Monster	怪物	Yes	No	Yes	Also executive producer
2026	Sheep in the Box	箱の中の羊	Yes	Yes	Yes	
2026	Look Back	ルックバック	Yes	Yes	Yes	

==== Only producer ====
Year	Film	Notes
1993	Kakuto	
2003	Hebi ichigo	
2006	Yureru	Planner
2014	leji	Consulting producer
2018	Ten Years Japan	Executive producer
2022	Mai Sumoru Rando	Executive producer

=== Documentaries ===
Year	Film	Notes	Ref.
1991	Lessons from a Calf		
1991	However...	Also producer	
1992	Where Has All the Pollution Gone?		
1992	I Wish I Could Be Japanese		
1993	When Cinema Reflects the Times: Hou Hsiao-hsien and Edward Yang	Documentary about filmmakers Hou Hsiao-hsien and Edward Yang	
1993	Soul Sketches-Every Person's Kenji Miyazawa	Documentary short film	
1993	Yottsu no shibu jikoku	Documentary short film	
1994	August without Him	Documentary about HIV patient Hirata Yutaka	
1996	This World	A filmed correspondence between Kawase Naomi and Kore-eda. Also writer and cinematographer	
2003	Birthplace	Documentary about the old sets from his first feature Maborosi; Also editor	
2008	Daijōbu Dearu Yō ni: Cocco Owaranai Tabi	Documentary about Cocco	
2008	Series Constitution. Article 9. War Renunciation. Oblivion		
2012	The Message from Fukushima	Documentary short	
2021	The Center Lane	Documentary short about swimmer Rikako Ikee	
2026	5: The Time Called Arashi	Documentary following Arashi up to their last concert (and end of activities) in May 2026	

=== Television ===
Year	Film	Credited as			Notes
Year	Film	Director	Writer	Editor	Notes
1991	Nonfix	Yes	No	No	TV Series
1996	Without Memory	Yes	Yes	Yes	TV Documentary Movie
2010	Kaidan Horror Classics	Yes	Yes	No	Anthology TV Series; Directed episode "Nochi no hi"
2012	Going My Home	Yes	Yes	Yes	TV Miniseries
2015	Ishibumi	Yes	No	No	TV Documentary film
2020	A Day-Off of Kasumi Arimura	Yes	No	No	TV Series; Directed episodes "Tada ima no nochi ni" and "Ningen Doku"
2023	The Makanai: Cooking for the Maiko House	Yes	Yes	Yes	TV Miniseries; Also executive producer
2025	Asura	Yes	Yes	Yes	TV Series

== Accolades ==
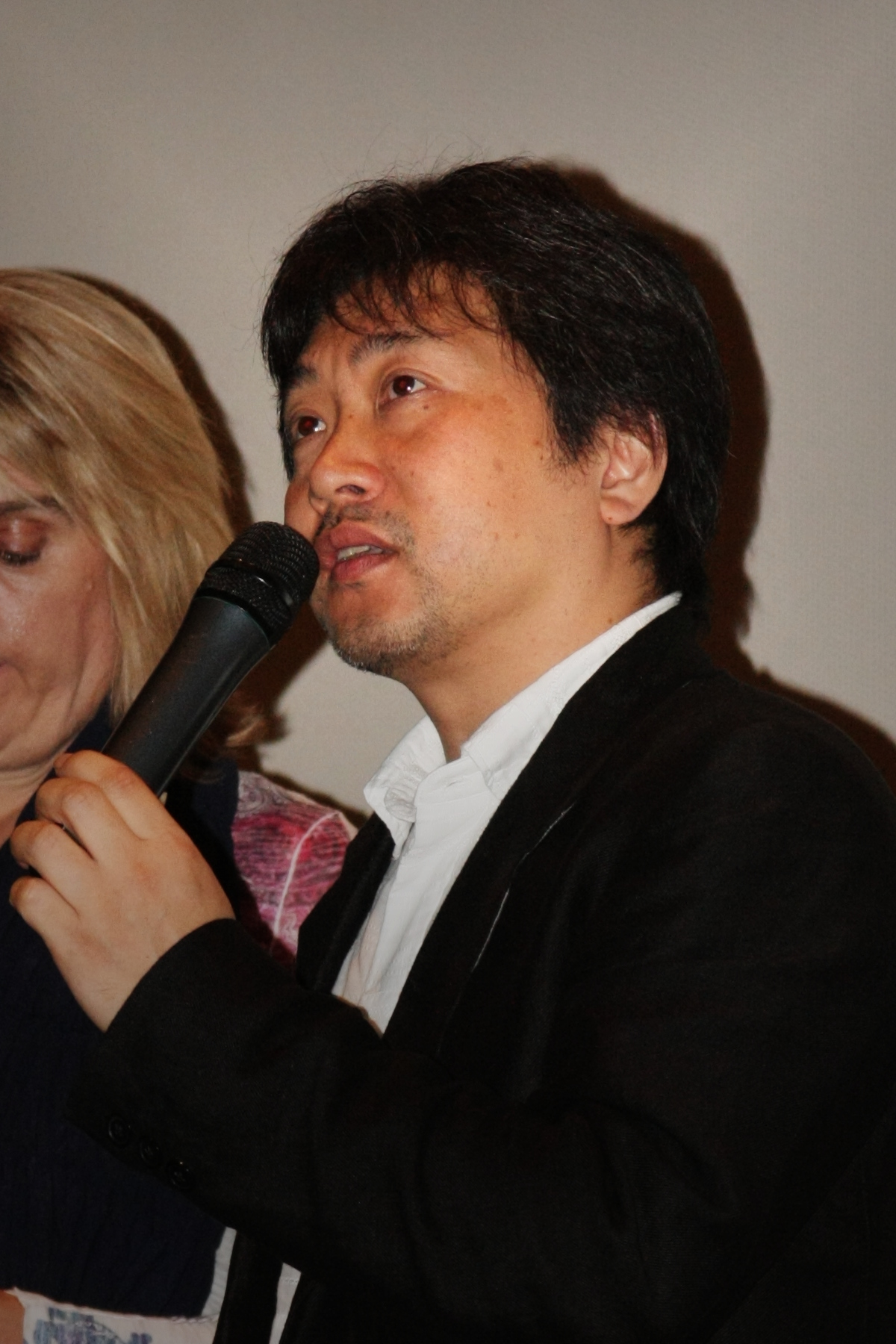
Kore-eda at the 2009 Toronto International Film Festival

- 1995: Vancouver International Film Festival – Dragons and Tigers Award (Maborosi)
- 1998: San Sebastian Film Festival – FIPRESCI Prize (After Life)
- 1998: Three Continents Festival – Golden Montgolfiere (After Life)
- 1999: Buenos Aires International Festival of Independent Cinema – Best Film and Best Screenplay (After Life)
- 2004: Flanders International Film Festival Ghent – Grand Prix (Nobody Knows)
- 2005: Blue Ribbon Awards – Best Film and Best Director (Nobody Knows)
- 2008: Mar del Plata International Film Festival – Best Film (Still Walking)
- 2009: Asian Film Awards – Best Director (Still Walking)
- 2009: Blue Ribbon Awards – Best Director (Still Walking)
- 2011: San Sebastian Film Festival – Best Screenplay (I Wish)
- 2012: Asia-Pacific Film Festival – Best Director (I Wish)
- 2013: Cannes Film Festival – Jury Prize (Like Father, Like Son)
- 2013: Asia-Pacific Film Festival – Best Film and Best Director (Like Father, Like Son)
- 2013: São Paulo International Film Festival – Audience Award Best Foreign Film (Like Father, Like Son)
- 2013: Vancouver International Film Festival – Audience Award International Films (Like Father, Like Son)
- 2013: Yokohama Film Festival – Best Screenplay (Like Father, Like Son)
- 2015: San Sebastian Film Festival – Audience Award Best Film (Our Little Sister)
- 2015: Yokohama Film Festival – Best Director (Our Little Sister)
- 2016: Japan Academy Prize – Best Film and Best Director (Our Little Sister)
- 2016: Films from the South – Best Film (After the Storm)
- 2018: Japan Academy Prize – Best Film, Best Director, Best Screenplay, and Best Editing (The Third Murder)
- 2018: Cannes Film Festival – Palme d'Or (Shoplifters)
- 2018: Los Angeles Film Critics Association – Best Foreign Film (Shoplifters)
- 2018: San Sebastián International Film Festival – Donostia Award
- 2018: Asia Pacific Screen Awards – Best Film (Shoplifters)
- 2018: Denver Film Festival – Best Film (Shoplifters)
- 2018: Filmfest München – Best International Film (Shoplifters)
- 2018: Films from the South – Audience Award (Shoplifters)
- 2018: Vancouver International Film Festival – Most Popular International Feature (Shoplifters)
- 2019: Asian Film Awards – Best Film (Shoplifters)
- 2019: Japan Academy Prize – Best Film, Best Director, and Best Screenplay (Shoplifters)
- 2019: César Award – Best Foreign Film (Shoplifters)
- 2019: Guldbagge Awards – Best Foreign Film (Shoplifters)
- 2022: Cannes Film Fesitval - Ecumenical Jury Award - (Broker)
- 2022: Venice International Film Festival - Robert Bresson Award - (Broker)
- 2023: Asian Film Awards – Best Director (Broker)
- 2023: Cannes Film Fesitval - Queer Palm (Monster)
- 2024: Asian Film Awards – Best Director (Monster)
- 2025: Seoul International Drama Awards - Best Director (Asura)
- 2026: Venice International Film Festival - Cinema & Arts Award (Look Back)
- 2026: Venice International Film Festival - CinemaSarà Award (Look Back)
- 2026: Venice International Film Festival - Fanheart3 Award – Special Mention (Look Back)
- 2026: Venice International Film Festival - SIGNIS Award (Look Back)
- 2026: Venice International Film Festival - UNIMED Award (Look Back)
- 2026: Singapore International Film Festival – Cinema Honorary Award

== Frequent collaborators ==
Work Actor	1995	1998	2001	2004	2006	2008	2009	2011	2012	2013	2015	2016	2017	2018	2019	2022	2023	2023	2025	2026	2026
Work Actor	Maborosi	After Life	Distance	Nobody Knows	Hana	Still Walking	Air Doll	I Wish	Going My Home	Like Father, Like Son	Our Little Sister	After the Storm	The Third Murder	Shoplifters	The Truth	Broker	The Makanai	Monster	Asura	Sheep in the Box	Look Back
Takashi Naitō																					
Sayaka Yoshino																					
Tadanobu Asano																					
Akira Emoto																					
Susumu Terajima																					
Arata Iura																					
Yusuke Iseya																					
Natsuo Ishidō																					
Kenichi Endō																					
Yui Natsukawa																					
Ryo Kase																					
Sei Hiraizumi																					
Hiei Kimura																					
Yūichi Kimura																					
You																					
Shirō Katō																					
Yoshio Harada†																					
Shohei Tanaka																					
Jun Kunimura																					
Tetsushi Tanaka																					
Rie Miyazawa																					
Hiroshi Abe																					
Kirin Kiki†																					
Ryōga Hayashi																					
Kazuya Takahashi																					
Joe Odagiri																					
Bae Doona																					
Mari Hoshino																					
Kimiko Yo																					
Kazuaki Shimizu																					
Yuri Nakamura																					
Oshiro Maeda																					
Masami Nagasawa																					
Isao Hashizume																					
Aju Makita																					
Lily Franky																					
Ichirō Ogura																					
Jun Fubuki																					
Yōko Maki																					
Masaharu Fukuyama																					
Tomomitsu Adachi																					
Machiko Ono																					
Suzu Hirose																					
Haruka Ayase																					
Izumi Matsuoka																					
Sosuke Ikematsu																					
Daisuke Kuroda																					
Taiyô Yoshizawa																					
Hajime Inoue																					
Kairi Jo																					
Sakura Ando																					
Miyu Sasaki																					
Keiko Matsuzaka																					
Natsuki Deguchi																					
Kayo Noro																					
Hinata Hiiragi																					
Akihiro Kakuta																					
