= Look Back (manga) =

Manga by Tatsuki Fujimoto

- Volume cover, featuring Ayumu Fujino

ルックバック (Rukku Bakku)
- Genre: Coming-of-age; Drama; Horror thriller
- Manga
- Written by: Tatsuki Fujimoto
- Published by: Shueisha
- English publisher: NA: Viz Media
- Imprint: Jump Comics+
- Magazine: Shōnen Jump+
- Published: July 19, 2021
- Volumes: 1
- Anime film
- Look Back (2024)
- Live-action film
- Look Back (2026)
- icon

Look Back (Japanese: ルックバック, Hepburn: Rukku Bakku) is a Japanese one-shot web manga written and illustrated by Tatsuki Fujimoto. It was published on Shueisha's Shōnen Jump+ in July 2021. It tells the story of Ayumu Fujino, a young manga artist who, driven by rivalry and friendship with a reclusive classmate, strives to improve her craft and finds purpose in creating art. It has received two adaptations, an anime film adaptation produced by Studio Durian premiered in June 2024, and a live-action film adaptation produced by K2 Pictures premiered in September 2026.

== Plot ==
Ayumu Fujino (藤野 歩, Fujino Ayumu) is an elementary schooler with a talent for drawing manga, publishing yonkoma in the school's paper, and revelling in being lauded for her skills by her peers and teachers. One day, however, her teacher asks her to give one of her strips over to Kyomoto (京本, Kyōmoto), a shut-in with severe social anxiety who longs to draw manga. Fujino reluctantly agrees but discovers that Kyomoto is a professionally skilled background illustrator who exclusively draws scenic artwork in her yonkoma, and demonstrates herself as the superior illustrator between the two. Envying Kyomoto's abilities, Fujino throws herself into improving her art skills, which leads to her alienating her friends and family as she obsesses over surpassing Kyomoto. Over the course of a year, despite improvements, Fujino fails to meet Kyomoto's standards and eventually quits drawing, rekindling her social life.

When her class graduates from middle school, Fujino is tasked with delivering Kyomoto's diploma to her. Fujino enters Kyomoto's house and finds piles of sketchbooks. Finding a slip of paper, she draws a yonkoma mocking Kyomoto, but it inadvertently slips under the door of Kyomoto's room. Though a remorseful Fujino tries to flee, Kyomoto—recognizing the artwork—comes out of her room to meet Fujino, revealing herself as a huge fan who had been following her manga in the school paper. When Kyomoto asks why she quit, Fujino—flattered by Kyomoto's enthusiastic idolization of her—claims it is because she has plans to submit manga to contests. On her way home, however, she finds her creative spark reinvigorated and decides to actually start drawing again.

Through high school years, she even invites Kyomoto to draw on the manga with her, and their eventual one-shot wins the contest. Having become friends from this experience, Fujino uses some of the prize money to take Kyomoto on a trip around town and continues to create manga under the pen name "Kyo Fujino", submitting multiple one-shots that receive high praise; afterwards, Kyomoto thanks Fujino for giving her the motivation to come out of her shell. After graduating from high school, they are given a chance to be serialized in Weekly Shōnen Jump, but Kyomoto declines as she wishes to get a formal education in art at Tohoku University of Art and Design. Upset at this decision, Fujino continues without her, working on her manga Shark Kick as Kyo Fujino. Though it becomes very popular, publishing eleven tankōbon volumes and receiving an anime adaptation, the adult Fujino feels unfulfilled without Kyomoto and cycles through assistants as a result.

On January 10, 2016, a man who accused Tohoku of plagiarizing his work commits mass murder there with a pickaxe, with Kyomoto being one of the casualties. Devastated after receiving the news, Fujino puts Shark Kick on hiatus and returns home to attend the funeral, eventually entering Kyomoto's house alone. Convincing herself that she had indirectly led Kyomoto to her death by inspiring her to pursue an art career, Fujino deems her art to have no value and tears up the mocking yonkoma she drew years ago. A scrap slips under Kyomoto's door, and seemingly, time travels to the day when the two met.

This time, Kyomoto is too alarmed by the scrap to exit her room, preventing her from meeting Fujino. Despite this, she still develops an interest in an art career and attends Tohoku. When the killer arrives, however, this reality's Fujino, who had continued to pursue athletics, physically incapacitates the man before he can hurt Kyomoto. As Fujino is loaded into an ambulance for injuries, the two meet similarly to the way they originally did. Returning home, Kyomoto draws a yonkoma, titled "Look Back", of Fujino saving her in Fujino's childhood style. A gust of wind blows the strip out of the room and into the view of Fujino back in the original timeline. Shocked by the strip, Fujino enters Kyomoto's room, finding multiple tankōbon and merchandise of Shark Kick, as well as Kyomoto supporting it in reader surveys, showing that despite their separate paths, Kyomoto never stopped looking up to her.

Still despairing over her life choices, Fujino complains that she hates drawing, only for Kyomoto's voice to ask, "Then, why do you draw, Fujino?", causing Fujino to remember all the times her manga made Kyomoto happy. Finally coming to terms with Kyomoto's death, Fujino decides to return and continue drawing manga, taping Kyomoto's yonkoma above her workstation.

== Media ==
=== Manga ===
The 143-page one-shot web manga Look Back, written and illustrated by Tatsuki Fujimoto, was published on Shueisha's Shōnen Jump+ online platform on July 19, 2021. It was collected by Shueisha in a single volume, released on September 3, 2021.

The one-shot was published online in English by Viz Media and Shueisha's Manga Plus platform. Viz Media published the volume on September 20, 2022.

On August 2, 2021, it was announced that a scene depicting a man having a "paranoid episode" going into an art school with an axe, claiming plagiarism from a student, was altered post-publication due to reader feedback. This was due to concerns that portraying a schizophrenic man as a mass murderer could stigmatize the mental illness. An article on the English-language website Anime News Network implied that some Japanese readers also objected to the similarities between the character's motivation and that of Shinji Aoba, the perpetrator behind the Kyoto Animation arson attack.

=== Anime film ===
In February 2024, an anime film adaptation was announced. It is produced by Studio Durian and directed by Kiyotaka Oshiyama, who is also in charge of the screenplay and character designs. The film was screened at the French Annecy International Animation Film Festival, which took place from June 9–15, 2024, participating in the "Annecy Presents" category, a non-competitive category created to showcase a variety of international animated films to audiences. It was distributed in Japanese theaters by Avex Pictures, premiering on June 28, 2024.

=== Live-action film ===
A live-action film adaptation was announced on December 2, 2025. It is produced by K2 Pictures and written, directed, and edited by Hirokazu Kore-eda. The film premiered in competition at the 83rd Venice International Film Festival on September 6, 2026, and released in Japanese theaters on September 11 of the same year.

== Reception ==
Look Back was acclaimed in Japan. It reached 2.5 million reads on the first date of publication, and reached over 4 million reads in two days.

The tankōbon volume sold 73,912 copies in its first week of release and 80,186 copies in the second, which placed it fourth and third, respectively, on Oricon's weekly manga chart. By July 2026, the manga had over one million copies in circulation.

Look Back topped Takarajimasha's Kono Manga ga Sugoi! 2022 list of best manga for male readers. It ranked 29th on the 2022 "Book of the Year" list by Da Vinci magazine. It achieved the special prize of the 2021 Twitter Japan's Trend Awards. The manga placed first on "The Best Manga 2022 Kono Manga wo Yome!" ranking by Freestyle magazine. It was also nominated for the 15th Manga Taishō in 2022 and placed second with 68 points. It won the Rakuten Kobo's E-book Award in the "One Complete Volume! One-Shot Manga" category in 2023. It was nominated for the 2023 Eisner Award in the Best U.S. Edition of International Material—Asia category.

Writer and editor Kazushi Shimada ranked it first on his top 10 manga of 2021. Sheena McNeil of Sequential Tart gave it a 7 out of 10. McNeil compared the story to Fujimoto's Chainsaw Man, stating that while Look Back is not a gore and violence story, it has the same type of storytelling, which "takes a character that's not all that likeable and makes us like them by challenging their point of view and having them grow." McNeil also praised the art, noting a "nice realism to it" and its visual pacing. Danica Davidson of Otaku USA praised the manga for its story and called the artwork "very impressive", noting how the art style changes over the course of the manga, "sometimes being incredibly detailed." Davidson concluded: "Look Back is melancholic, bittersweet and unique, and a great opportunity for Fujimoto to show off his skills." Writing for Polygon, Ana Diaz praised Look Back's subtlety and wrote that "what makes it an essential read for any new reader or veteran is how it prompts readers to think about how the art in their hands was made."
