= Look Back (2024 film) =

2024 Japanese animated film by Kiyotaka Oshiyama

- Theatrical release poster

Japanese name
- Katakana: ルックバック
Transcriptions
- Revised Hepburn: Rukku Bakku
- Directed by: Kiyotaka Oshiyama
- Screenplay by: Kiyotaka Oshiyama
- Based on: Look Back by Tatsuki Fujimoto
- Starring: Yuumi Kawai; Mizuki Yoshida
- Music by: Haruka Nakamura
- Production company: Studio Durian
- Distributed by: Avex Pictures
- Release dates: June 2024 (Annecy); 28 June 2024 (Japan)
- Running time: 60 minutes
- Country: Japan
- Language: Japanese
- Box office: US$25.2 million

Look Back (Japanese: ルックバック, Hepburn: Rukku Bakku) is a 2024 Japanese animated coming-of-age drama film based on the one-shot web manga of the same name by Tatsuki Fujimoto. The film is directed by Kiyotaka Oshiyama, who also wrote the screenplay and served as a character designer, and produced by Studio Durian. It stars Yuumi Kawai and Mizuki Yoshida as two girls with a passion for drawing—the outgoing Fujino (Kawai) and the truant recluse Kyomoto (Yoshida), the latter of whose artistic ability inspires a competitive fervor in Fujino that soon develops into a partnership.

Look Back premiered at the 2024 Annecy International Animation Film Festival. It was theatrically released in Japan by Avex Pictures on 28 June 2024. The film received universal acclaim.

== Plot ==
Ayumu Fujino (藤野 歩, Fujino Ayumu) is an elementary schooler with a talent for drawing manga, publishing yonkoma in the school's paper, and revelling in being lauded for her skills by her peers and teachers. One day, however, her teacher asks her to give one of her strips over to Kyomoto (京本, Kyōmoto), a shut-in with severe social anxiety who longs to draw manga. Fujino reluctantly agrees but discovers that Kyomoto is a professionally skilled background illustrator who exclusively draws scenic artwork in her yonkoma, and demonstrates herself as the superior illustrator between the two. Envying Kyomoto's abilities, Fujino throws herself into improving her art skills, which leads to her alienating her friends and family as she obsesses over surpassing Kyomoto. Over the course of a year, despite improvements, Fujino fails to meet Kyomoto's standards and eventually quits drawing, rekindling her social life.

When her class graduates from middle school, Fujino is tasked with delivering Kyomoto's diploma to her. Fujino enters Kyomoto's house and finds piles of sketchbooks. Finding a slip of paper, she draws a yonkoma mocking Kyomoto, but it inadvertently slips under the door of Kyomoto's room. Though a remorseful Fujino tries to flee, Kyomoto—recognizing the artwork—comes out of her room to meet Fujino, revealing herself as a huge fan who had been following her manga in the school paper. When Kyomoto asks why she quit, Fujino—flattered by Kyomoto's enthusiastic idolization of her—claims it is because she has plans to submit manga to contests. On her way home, however, she finds her creative spark reinvigorated and decides to actually start drawing again.

Through high school years, she even invites Kyomoto to draw on the manga with her, and their eventual one-shot wins the contest. Having become friends from this experience, Fujino uses some of the prize money to take Kyomoto on a trip around town and continues to create manga under the pen name "Kyo Fujino", submitting multiple one-shots that receive high praise; afterwards, Kyomoto thanks Fujino for giving her the motivation to come out of her shell. After graduating from high school, they are given a chance to be serialized in Weekly Shōnen Jump, but Kyomoto declines as she wishes to get a formal education in art at Tohoku University of Art and Design. Upset at this decision, Fujino continues without her, working on her manga Shark Kick as Kyo Fujino. Though it becomes very popular, publishing eleven tankōbon volumes and receiving an anime adaptation, the adult Fujino feels unfulfilled without Kyomoto and cycles through assistants as a result.

On January 10, 2016, a man who accused Tohoku of plagiarizing his work commits mass murder there with a pickaxe, with Kyomoto being one of the casualties. Devastated after receiving the news, Fujino puts Shark Kick on hiatus and returns home to attend the funeral, eventually entering Kyomoto's house alone. Convincing herself that she had indirectly led Kyomoto to her death by inspiring her to pursue an art career, Fujino deems her art to have no value and tears up the mocking yonkoma she drew years ago. A scrap slips under Kyomoto's door, and seemingly, time travels to the day when the two met.

This time, Kyomoto is too alarmed by the scrap to exit her room, preventing her from meeting Fujino. Despite this, she still develops an interest in an art career and attends Tohoku. When the killer arrives, however, this reality's Fujino, who had continued to pursue athletics, physically incapacitates the man before he can hurt Kyomoto. As Fujino is loaded into an ambulance for injuries, the two meet similarly to the way they originally did. Returning home, Kyomoto draws a yonkoma, titled "Look Back", of Fujino saving her in Fujino's childhood style. A gust of wind blows the strip out of the room and into the view of Fujino back in the original timeline. Shocked by the strip, Fujino enters Kyomoto's room, finding multiple tankōbon and merchandise of Shark Kick, as well as Kyomoto supporting it in reader surveys, showing that despite their separate paths, Kyomoto never stopped looking up to her.

Still despairing over her life choices, Fujino complains that she hates drawing, only for Kyomoto's voice to ask, "Then, why do you draw, Fujino?", causing Fujino to remember all the times her manga made Kyomoto happy. Finally coming to terms with Kyomoto's death, Fujino decides to return and continue drawing manga, taping Kyomoto's yonkoma above her workstation.

== Cast ==
Character	Japanese voice actor	English dubbing actor
Ayumu Fujino	Yuumi Kawai	Valerie Rose Lohman
Kyomoto	Mizuki Yoshida	Grace Lu
Homeroom Teacher	Yoichiro Saito	
Classmates	Rina Endō; Shinnosuke Tokudome; Nanaka Shogaki; Taisei Miyagishi; Haruto Shima; Minori Takanami; Sakura Tsutsumi	
Editor	Koya Yoshihashi	
Man	Kota Oka	Ryan Colt Levy
Fujino's Sister	Kureha Maki	
Newscaster	Takeshi Miyajima	
Announcer	Daisuke Takahashi	
Teacher	Jun Ito	
Friend's Mother	Kaori Takeuchi	
Grandmother	Masuma Taira	
Shut-in Competition Announcer	Seila Ina	
Man from 4-koma	Toshiyuki Morikawa	Ryan Colt Levy
Woman from 4-koma	Maaya Sakamoto	

== Production ==
In February 2024, an anime film adaptation of the manga Look Back was announced. In March 2024, it was announced that Kawai and Yoshida had joined the voice cast as Fujino and Kyomoto, respectively.

=== Music ===
The music is composed by Haruka Nakamura; the film's theme song, "Light Song", is composed by Nakamura and performed by Urara.

== Release ==
Look Back premiered at the 2024 Annecy International Animation Film Festival, which took place in Annecy, France, from 9–15 June 2024, in the "Annecy Presents" category, a non-competitive category created to showcase a variety of international animated films to audiences.

Look Back received a theatrical release in Japan by Avex Pictures on 28 June 2024, screening in 119 theaters nationwide. Due to positive critical and commercial response, including positive word of mouth, its release expanded to 11 more theaters on July 5.

In the United States, the Japan Society screened the film on 14 July 2024, in Japanese with English subtitles, as part of the "Japan Cuts: Festival of New Japanese Cinema" event at New York. The film has been licensed in North America by GKIDS and premiered in theaters on 4 October 2024. Singapore-based film distributor Encore Films licensed the film in Southeast Asian countries and released it in theaters. The film was released worldwide on streaming by Amazon MGM Studios through Prime Video on 7 November 7 2024; it includes the original Japanese audio with English subtitles, as well as an English dub.

== Reception ==
=== Box office ===
Look Back grossed US$2 million in the United States and US$23.2 million in other territories, for a worldwide total of US$25.2 million. The film grossed over ¥227 million (around US$1.47 million) in its opening weekend at the Japanese box office. By 17 July, after 18 days in theaters, it had made ¥1,017,961,780 (around $6.41 million).

=== Critical response ===
Look Back was universally acclaimed by critics. On the review aggregator website Rotten Tomatoes, Look Back has a 100% critic rating based on 26 reviews and the average rating is 8.7/10. Metacritic, which uses a weighted average, assigned the film a score of 90 out of 100, based on six critics, indicating "universal acclaim".

IndieWire's David Ehrlich gave the film a grade of "B+", praising the character design and the emotional weight of the story; Ehrlich wrote that, "the fleeting nature of Oshiyama's film, which so fluidly renders eons of labor with the lightness of memory and the brilliance of a shooting star, is what ultimately allows it to crystallize a truth that most artists can only hope to accept for themselves ...: Making things isn't a waste of time or a way of isolating oneself from the world, but rather the most beautiful way of belonging to it." Robbie Collin of The Telegraph gave the film a score of five out of five stars, praising its visuals as "wildly yet unassumingly beautiful" and its plot as accessible "yet philosophically rich"; he concluded: "There's a haiku-like purity to it: Look Back is as neat and yet also as overflowing as the four-panel strips in which its leads once diligently honed their craft. And if something so beautiful also feels too brief – well, that may be the idea."

=== Accolades ===
Accolades received by Look Back
Award	Date of ceremony	Category	Recipient(s)	Result	Ref.
Annie Awards	February 8, 2025	Best Animated Feature – Independent	Look Back	Nominated	
Blue Ribbon Awards	February 2025	Best Film	Look Back	Nominated	
Crunchyroll Anime Awards	May 25, 2025	Film of the Year	Look Back	Won	
Crunchyroll Anime Awards	May 25, 2025	Best Score	Haruka Nakamura	Nominated	
Crunchyroll Anime Awards	May 25, 2025	Best Voice Artist Performance (Italian)	Ilaria Pellicone (as Kyomoto)	Won	
Hochi Film Awards	December 16, 2024	Best Animated Picture	Look Back	Won	
Japan Academy Film Prize	March 14, 2025	Best Animated Picture	Look Back	Won	
Japan Expo Awards	July 4, 2025	Daruma for Best Anime	Look Back	Nominated	
Japan Expo Awards	July 4, 2025	Daruma for Best Feature Film	Look Back	Won	
Japan Expo Awards	July 4, 2025	Daruma for Best Slice of Life Anime	Look Back	Won	
Japanese Movie Critics Awards	June 9, 2025	Best Animation of the Year	Look Back	Won	
Nikkan Sports Film Awards	December 27, 2024	Best Film	Look Back	Nominated	
Nikkan Sports Film Awards	December 27, 2024	Best Actress	Yuumi Kawai	Nominated	
Seiyu Awards	March 15, 2025	Special Award	Look Back	Won	
Tokyo Anime Award Festival	March 2025	Animation of the Year (Feature Film)	Look Back	Won	
Tokyo Anime Award Festival	March 2025	Best Director	Kiyotaka Oshiyama	Won	
