= Atom Shukugawa =

Japanese comedian

Atom Shukugawa (夙川アトム)
- Born: Hiroyuki Tanaka (田中 博之); December 22, 1979 (age 46); Nishinomiya, Hyogo Prefecture, Japan

Comedy career
- Years active: 1999–present
- Medium: Stand-up comedy

Atom Shukugawa (夙川アトム; born December 22, 1979) is a Japanese comedian from Nishinomiya, Hyogo Prefecture. His real name is Hiroyuki Tanaka (田中 博之) and the screen name's "Shukugawa" derives from the name of a river running through Nishinomiya. As of August 2009, he belongs to the management company ASH & D corporation.

Shukugawa won the 10th place in the R-1 Grand Prix 2008 and the second place in the "Owarai geinin utaga umai ohza ketteisen special" (singing competition for comedians) in August 2009.

== Filmography ==
=== Film ===
- The Lines That Define Me (2022), Takiyanagi
- Drawing Closer (2024)

=== Television ===
- Beppin-san (2016–17), Kotarō Koyama
