= Karateka (film) =

- Theatrical release poster
- Directed by: Aritz Moreno
- Written by: David B. Gil; Pablo Tobías Gavasa; Javier Gullón (coll.)
- Produced by: Jaime Ortiz de Artiñano; Leire Apellaniz
- Starring: Andrea Ros; Patrick Criado; Mizuki Yoshida; Denden; Ernesto Alterio; Pilar Castro; Antonio Durán "Morris"; Chani Martín
- Cinematography: Javier Agirre
- Edited by: Raúl López Romero
- Music by: Maite Arroitajauregi
- Production companies: Atresmedia Cine; Señor y Señora; Karateka AIE; Apaches Entertainment; Colosé Producciones; Wrong Men
- Distributed by: Warner Bros. Pictures
- Release dates: 21 September 2026 (Zinemaldia); 30 October 2026 (Spain)
- Countries: Spain; Belgium
- Language: Spanish

Karateka is a 2026 biographical film directed by Aritz Moreno starring Andrea Ros as Sandra Sánchez alongside Patrick Criado. It is a Spanish-Belgian co-production.

== Plot ==
The plot follows the career of Spanish karateka Sandra Sánchez from her humble beginnings in Talavera de la Reina to winning gold at the 2020 Tokyo Olympics.

== Cast ==
- Andrea Ros as Sandra Sánchez
- Patrick Criado as Jesús del Moral
- Ernesto Alterio
- Antonio Durán "Morris"
- Pablo Álvarez
- Pilar Castro
- Vicente Vergara
- Edu Ferrés
- Marta Pons
- Chani Martín
- Mizuki Yoshida
- Denden
- Ayako Fujitani
- Katsuki Suzuki
- Hoshimi Asai

== Production ==
The screenplay was written by Pablo Tobías and David B. Gil. The film is a co-production by Atresmedia Cine, Sr.&Sra., Karateka AIE, Apaches Entertainment, Colosé Producciones alongside Wrong Men, and it had the participation of Atresmedia and Netflix, backing and funding from Creative Europe MEDIA, Wallimage and ICAA and collaboration by Ayuntamiento de Madrid. Javier Agirre worked as cinematographer. Shooting locations included Madrid, Tottori, and Fujinomiya.

== Release ==
Karateka premiered in the 'Velodrome' section of the 74th San Sebastián International Film Festival on 21 September 2026. It was released theatrically in Spain by Warner Bros. Pictures on 30 October 2026.

== See also ==
- List of Spanish films of 2026
