= Drawing Closer =

2024 Japanese film by Takahiro Miki

- Promotional release poster
- Japanese: 余命一年の僕が、余命半年の君と出会った話
- Directed by: Takahiro Miki
- Screenplay by: Takahiro Miki; Tomoko Yoshida
- Based on: Yomei Ichinen no Boku ga, Yomei Hantoshi no Kimi to Deatta Hanashi by Ao Morita
- Produced by: Shuhei Akita; Kei Haruna; Sho Toguchi; Tatsuya Banno
- Starring: Ren Nagase; Natsuki Deguchi
- Cinematography: Hiroo Yanagida
- Music by: Seiji Kameda
- Production companies: Django Films; Nikkatsu Corporation
- Distributed by: Netflix
- Release date: 27 June 2024 (Japan)
- Running time: 120 minutes
- Country: Japan
- Language: Japanese

Drawing Closer (余命一年の僕が、余命半年の君と出会った話, Yomei Ichinen no Boku ga, Yomei Hantoshi no Kimi to Deatta Hanashi; lit. 'The story of how I, who had only one year left to live, met you, who had only six months left to live') is a 2024 Japanese romance drama film written and directed by Takahiro Miki and starring Ren Nagase and Natsuki Deguchi. It was released on Netflix on 27 June 2024.

== Cast ==
- Ren Nagase as Akito Hayasaka
- Natsuki Deguchi as Haruna Sakurai
- Mayuu Yokota as Ayaka Miura
- Kyoka Shibata as Eri Fujimoto
- Ikuho Akiya as Shōta Murai
- Rui Tsukishima as Natsumi Hayasaka
- Toru Nakamura as Kazuki Hayasaka, Akito Hayasaka's father
- Nene Otsuka as Itsumi Hayasaka, Akito Hayasaka's mother
- Kenji Mizuhashi as Haruna Sakurai's father
- Yasuko Matsuyuki as Hazuki Sakurai, Haruna Sakurai's mother
- Fumino Kimura as Mikiko
- Kazuki Otomo as Takada
- Atom Shukugawa as Art teacher
- Toru Nomaguchi as Doctor

== Production ==
The films was announced on Netflix by Nikkatsu. It is based on Ao Morita's Yomei Ichinen no Boku ga, Yomei Hantoshi no Kimi to Deatta Hanashi.

== Reception ==
Arjan Welles of FilmTotaal rated the film with 3.5/5 stars. Daniel Hart of Ready Steady Cut rated the film with 3/5 stars.

Tatat Bunnag of Bangkok Post, Matthew Donato of Collider, and John Serba of Decider also reviewed the film.
