= Sheep in the Box =

2026 film by Hirokazu Koreeda

- Theatrical release poster
- Japanese: 箱の中の羊
- Revised Hepburn: Hako no Naka no Hitsuji
- Directed by: Hirokazu Kore-eda
- Screenplay by: Hirokazu Kore-eda
- Story by: Hirokazu Kore-eda
- Starring: Haruka Ayase; Daigo Yamamoto; Rimu Kuwaki
- Cinematography: Ryûto Kondô
- Edited by: Hirokazu Kore-eda
- Music by: Yuta Bandoh
- Production company: Aoi Pro.
- Distributed by: Toho; Gaga Corporation
- Release dates: 16 May 2026 (Cannes); 29 May 2026 (Japan)
- Running time: 127 minutes
- Country: Japan
- Language: Japanese
- Box office: $4.5 million

Sheep in the Box (Japanese: 箱の中の羊, Hepburn: Hako no Naka no Hitsuji) is a 2026 Japanese science fiction drama film written, directed and edited by Hirokazu Koreeda. It stars Haruka Ayase and Daigo Yamamoto as a couple who welcomes a child (simulated age of seven) humanoid robot (Kuwaki Rimu), following the death of their son.

The film had its world premiere in the main competition of the 2026 Cannes Film Festival on 16 May, where it competed for the Palme d'Or. It received mixed reviews. It was theatrically released in Japan by Toho on 29 May.

== Cast ==
- Haruka Ayase as Otone Komoto
- Daigo Yamamoto as Kensuke Komoto
- Rimu Kuwaki as Kakeru, a humanoid robot
- Nana Seino as Alice Kotaki
- Kanichiro as Gen Hidaka
- Hinata Hiiragi as Takuto Konno
- Akihiro Kakuta as Junichi Hano
- Kayo Noro as Kasumi Hano
- Mari Hoshino as a mother who accepted a humanoid robot as her son.
- Ayumu Nakajima as an engineer
- Kimiko Yo as Nobuyo Nishimura
- Min Tanaka as Akio Yamagata

== Production ==
Japanese cinematographer Ryûto Kondô shot the film on 35mm, marking his third collaboration with Koreeda following Shoplifters (2018) and Monster (2023).

== Release ==
The film had its world premiere at the main competition of the 2026 Cannes Film Festival on 16 May, where it competed for the Palme d'Or. It was theatrically released in Japan by Toho on 29 May 2026.

It was screened in the Summer Screen Programme section of the 32nd Sarajevo Film Festival in August 2026.

In late 2025, Neon acquired the film's rights for the for U.S., U.K. and Australia. It was theatrically released in the United States on 24 July 2026.

== Reception ==
=== Box office ===
It grossed $4.5 million at the worldwide box office. Including $3.7 million at the Japanese box office.

=== Critical response ===
On the review aggregator website Rotten Tomatoes, 43% of 94 critics' reviews are positive, with an average rating of 5.7/10. The website's consensus reads: "A rare disappointment from director Hirokazu Koreeda, Sheep in the Box is a muted domestic drama whose rumination on artificial intelligence could have used more of the filmmaker's characteristic humanity." Metacritic, which uses a weighted average, assigned the film a score of 53 out of 100, based on 24 critics, indicating "mixed or average" reviews.

=== Accolades ===
Award	Date of ceremony	Category	Recipient(s)	Result	Ref.
Hochi Film Awards	December 2026	Best Picture	Sheep in the Box	Pending	
Hochi Film Awards	December 2026	Best Director	Hirokazu Kore-eda (Note: Also for Look Back)	Pending	
Hochi Film Awards	December 2026	Best Actress	Haruka Ayase (Note: Also for One Last Love Letter)	Pending	
Nikkan Sports Film Awards	27 December 2026	Best Actor	Daigo	Pending	
Nikkan Sports Film Awards	27 December 2026	Best Actress	Haruka Ayase	Pending	
