= Denden =

Japanese actor

- でんでん
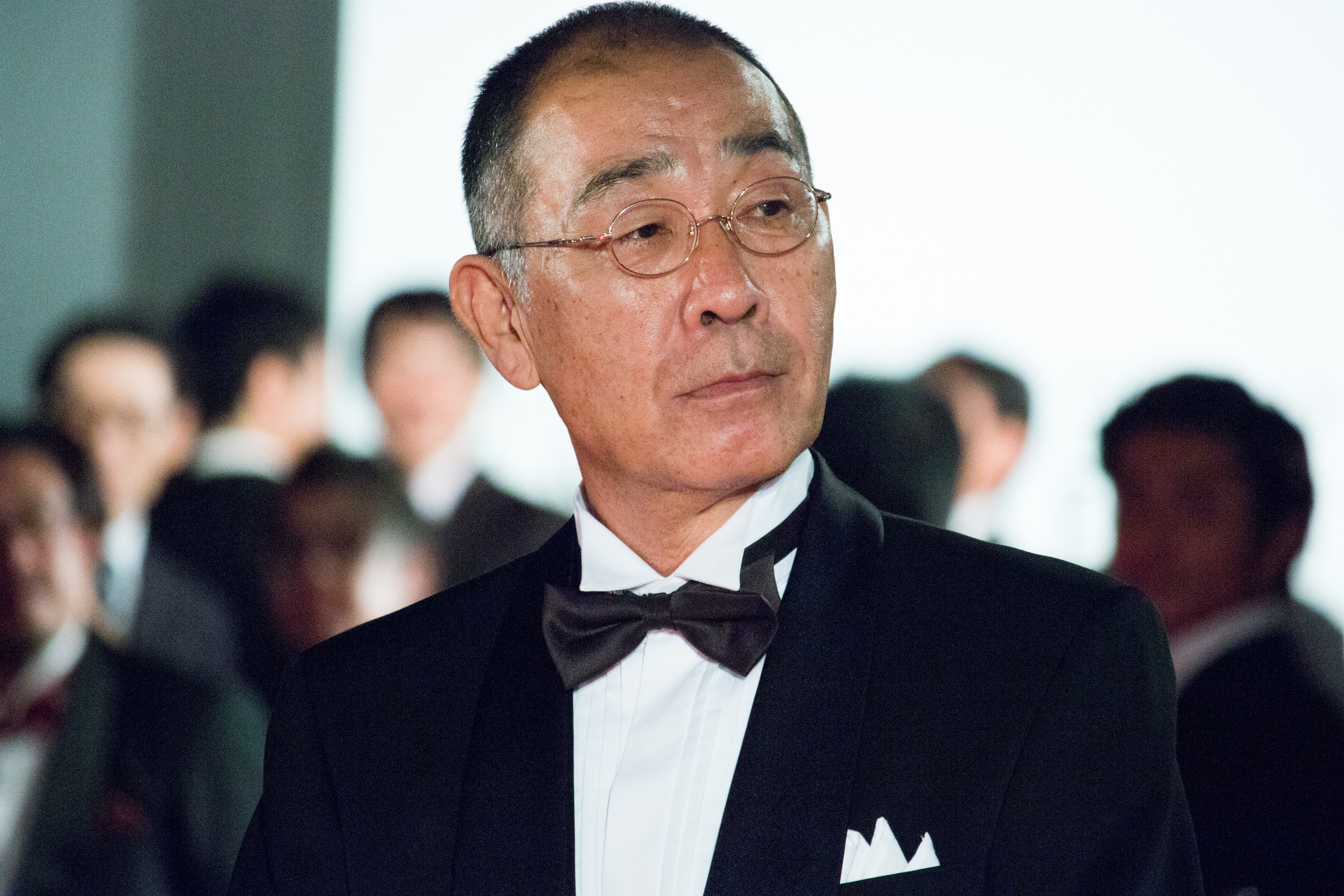
- Denden in October 2015
- Born: Yoshihiro Ogata; 23 January 1950 (age 76); Chikushino, Fukuoka, Japan
- Occupations: Actor; comedian
- Years active: 1980–present

Yoshihiro Ogata (緒方 義博, Ogata Yoshihiro; born 23 January 1950), better known as Denden (でんでん) and sometimes credited as Kanichi Tadokoro (田所 完一, Tadokoro Kan'ichi), is a Japanese actor and former comedian. He has appeared in more than 100 films since 1981.

== Selected filmography ==
=== Film ===
Year	Title	Role	Notes	Ref.
2018	Last Winter, We Parted			
2020	Stardust Over the Town			
2021	The Supporting Actors: The Movie	Himself		
2022	A Man			
2022	I Am Makimoto	Shimobayashi		
2022	A Turtle's Shell Is a Human's Ribs	Usazō (voice)		
2023	Mountain Woman			
2023	Insomniacs After School			
2023	Don't Call It Mystery: The Movie			
2024	The Parades			
2024	Living in Two Worlds	Yasuo Suzuki		
2025	A Moon in the Ordinary			
2025	Spirit World	Koji	French-Japanese film	
2025	Emergency Interrogation Room: The Final Movie	Susumu Hishimoto		
2026	Karateka		Spanish film	

=== Television ===
Year	Title	Role	Notes	Ref.
1991	Taiheiki	Jinguji Masafusa	Taiga drama	
2014–2025	Emergency Interrogation Room	Susumu Hishimoto	5 seasons	
2017	Naotora: The Lady Warlord	Okuyama Tomotoshi	Taiga drama	
2022	Ishiko and Haneo: You're Suing Me?	Kyōhei Yamada		
2023	The Days			
2023	What Will You Do, Ieyasu?	Saishō Jōtai	Taiga drama	
2024	Light of My Lion	Torakichi Yoshimi		
