= Aoi Yamada =

Japanese dancer, model, and actress (born 2000)

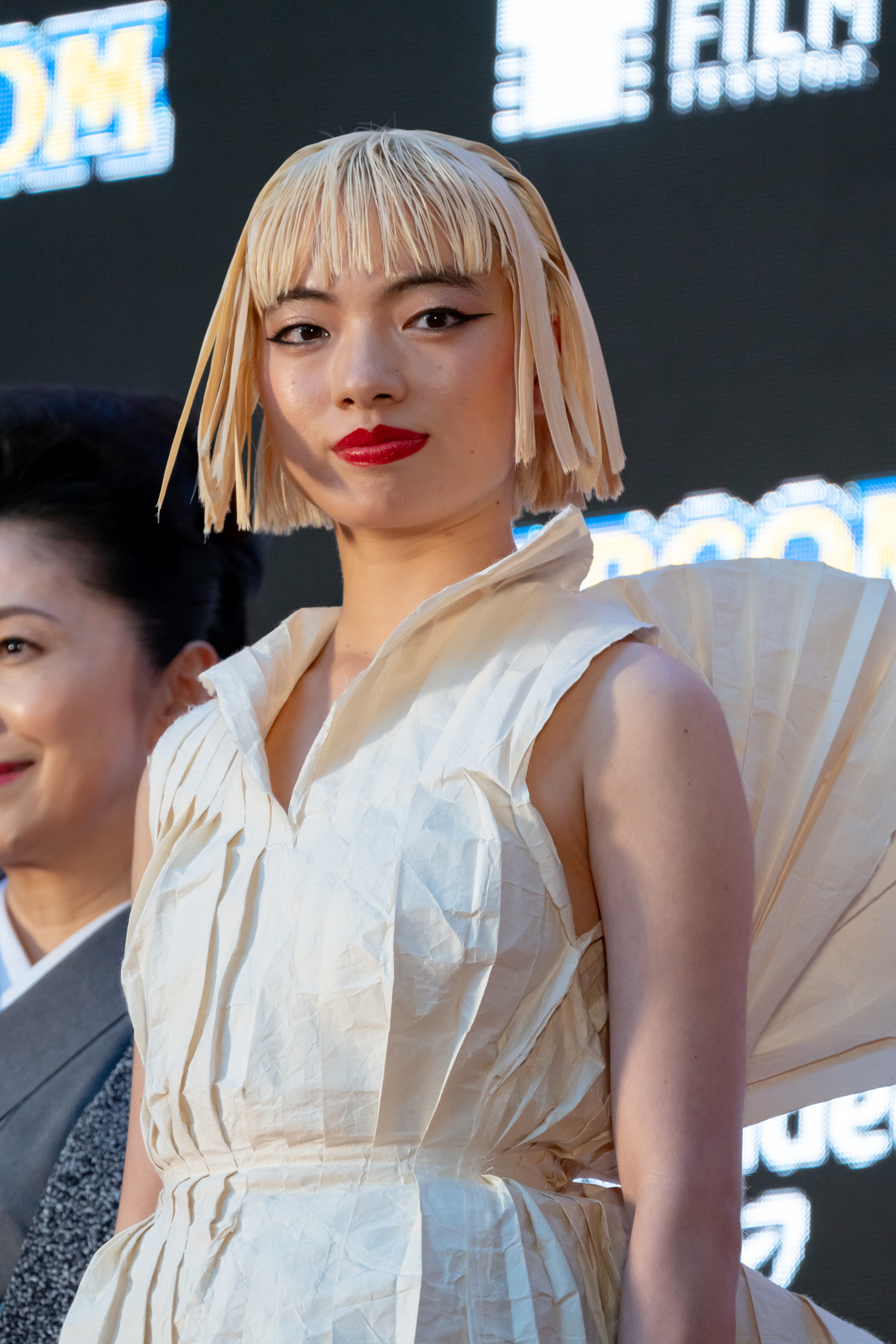
- Yamada at the 36th Tokyo International Film Festival (2023)
- Born: June 24, 2000 (age 26); Matsumoto, Nagano, Japan
- Occupations: Dancer; model; actress
- Website: www.aoiyamada.com

Aoi Yamada (山田 葵, Yamada Aoi, born June 24, 2000) is a Japanese dancer, model and actress based in Tokyo. Her dance form is inspired by expressionist and butoh movements. In 2021, Yamada performed at the closing ceremony of the 2020 Summer Olympics.

As an actress, Yamada has appeared in the television series First Love (2022) and in the Wim Wenders film Perfect Days (2023).

== Early life ==
Aoi Yamada was born on June 24, 2000 in Matsumoto, Nagano Prefecture, Japan. She was a shy and introverted child. Yamada became interested in dance and fashion at the age of five.

== Career ==
Yamada moved to Tokyo at age 15 to pursue a career as a dancer. She then started to model and perform in numerous music videos and stage performances, including at Baselworld in 2018 and 2019. Yamada has also performed at the Yokohama Sogo Museum of Art and for the Kanagawa Arts Theatre. During the closing ceremony of the 2020 Summer Olympics, held in Tokyo, Yamada danced a solo performance.

During the COVID-19 pandemic, Yamada went viral on social media for videos of herself dancing with vegetables. The videos brought her to the attention of fashion designer Stella McCartney, with whom she will collaborate frequently in the future. Yamada also modeled for Fred Perry, Lacoste, Rabanne, and Uniqlo. She has appeared in the magazines Numéro, Bella, Madame Figaro, CYAN and Rice.

Yamada made her acting debut in 2021 in a minor role in the Wowow drama FM 999: 999 Women's Songs. She subsequently acted in the short film Somewhere in the Snow and in the romantic TV series First Love. Yamada next appeared as Aya in the 2023 film by Wim Wenders, Perfect Days, opposite Koji Yakusho.

Yamada is part of the WACK unit AiNATOAOI alongside singer and idol Aina the End. The duo previously collaborated on the music video for "Red:birthmark". She also appeared in the music video for "Iranai" by Sakanaction.

In 2026, Yamada starred in the films Her Private Hell and Burn. She appeared on the April 2026 cover of WIRED Japan.

== Filmography ==
=== Film ===
Year	Title	Role	Notes	Ref.
2023	Six Singing Women			
2023	Perfect Days	Aya	Japanese-German film	
2026	Mag Mag	Rumi Mochizuki		
2026	Her Private Hell	Ms. S		
2026	Burn	Yoko Mitsuba		
2027	The Day We Embraced the Universe			

=== Television ===
Year	Title	Role	Notes	Ref.
2022	First Love	Uta Komori		
2023	Ya Boy Kongming!	Rena		
