= Her Private Hell (2026 film) =

Film by Nicolas Winding Refn

- American theatrical release poster
- Directed by: Nicolas Winding Refn
- Screenplay by: Nicolas Winding Refn; Esti Giordani
- Story by: Nicolas Winding Refn
- Produced by: Nicolas Winding Refn
- Starring: Sophie Thatcher; Charles Melton; Havana Rose Liu; Kristine Froseth; Shioli Kutsuna; Aoi Yamada; Dougray Scott; Diego Calva; Hidetoshi Nishijima
- Cinematography: Magnus Nordenhof Jønck
- Edited by: Matthew Newman
- Music by: Pino Donaggio
- Production companies: Neon; byNWR Originals
- Distributed by: Neon (United States and Denmark); Scanbox Entertainment (Denmark)
- Release dates: 18 May 2026 (Cannes); 24 July 2026 (United States); 15 October 2026 (Denmark)
- Running time: 110 minutes
- Countries: United States; Denmark
- Languages: English; Japanese
- Box office: $1.2 million

Her Private Hell (also known as Her Private Hell by NWR) is a 2026 science fiction thriller film directed, co-written, and produced by Nicolas Winding Refn. Starring Sophie Thatcher, Charles Melton, Havana Rose Liu, Kristine Froseth, Shioli Kutsuna, Aoi Yamada, Dougray Scott, Diego Calva, and Hidetoshi Nishijima, it follows a troubled young woman named Elle, who searches for her father as a mysterious mist engulfs her dystopian city, crossing paths with an American G.I. who searches for his daughter.

The film had its world premiere out of competition at the 2026 Cannes Film Festival on 18 May, and was theatrically released in the United States by Neon on 24 July. It received mixed reviews from critics, who praised the cinematography and production values, but criticized the narrative's pacing as sluggish and meandering.

== Plot ==
In an eerie, futuristic city engulfed by a mysterious mist, actress Elle returns home to the Tower Hotel. She meets her new co-star Hunter, a young influencer whose travel arrangements were disrupted by the mist. Brought to stay in Elle's family's suite, the naïve Hunter is enamored with the jaded Elle's opulent life. Elle has a strained relationship with her friend-turned-stepmother Dominique, who married her lecherous father, famed filmmaker Johnny Thunders.

The women have a fitting with sinister dressmakers Ms. S and Ms. T, who prick Elle with a pin as a sign of good luck. Later, Johnny Thunders tells the women about the legend of the Leatherman, a murderous spirit with diamond-encrusted gloves, who appears with the mist and can only be killed by cutting off his hands. Elle hopes that the film she and her father are making will bring them closer together, but he soon departs after urging her to bury the hatchet with Dominique. Elle and Hunter witness the Leatherman murder a neighbor, ripping her chest open and throwing her through a window.

They continue to shoot Johnny's science fiction film, an adaptation of a comic book called Candyfloss: Elle's character crash-lands her spaceship on a crystal planet, where she is betrayed by Dominique. Hunter stops the scene to tell them of her research into the Leatherman, perceived by some as the Devil, and the Kingmakers, a pair of kitsune who help him find his destroyer. Johnny has left Elle a golden hatchet as a birthday gift, and she finds his forgotten leather jacket with a cigarette lighter belonging to Private K, an American G.I. once stationed in Japan.

Decades before, K believed the Leatherman was responsible for the disappearance of his daughter, hunting him for years. After attacking a yakuza boss and his men, K is flogged by the police as punishment. The Leatherman's kitsune, Ms. S and Ms. T, tell K that his daughter is still alive and that he must kill the Leatherman to free her. Ambushed by the yakuza, K kills them, only to be drawn through a mirror into the Leatherman's ghostly, crystalline realm, which resembles the Candyfloss set.

Celebrating Elle's birthday, Dominique brings her and Hunter to party with Johnny's rival, Nico. Dominique confides in Elle that she has slept with Nico, part of the understanding she and Johnny have about their marriage. She tries to repair her friendship with Elle, who kisses her, but Dominique gently turns her down, leading Elle to seduce Nico instead. Trapped in the other realm, K watches helplessly as Hunter is killed by the Leatherman.

Returning to the hotel, Elle gropes the sleeping Dominique and spitefully forces her underwear, which she used to wipe Nico's semen off her leg, into Dominique's mouth. A vicious argument ensues and an increasingly unhinged Elle swings the golden hatchet at Dominique. The Leatherman appears, kills Dominique, and pursues Elle into the crystal realm. There, K fights the Leatherman and is nearly defeated, but Elle chops off the Leatherman's hands with her hatchet. The Leatherman vanishes, and K is reunited with his daughter, while the kitsune offer the Leatherman's gloves to Elle with the chance to "find what [she] has lost."

== Cast ==
- Sophie Thatcher as Elle
- Charles Melton as Private K
- Havana Rose Liu as Dominique
- Kristine Froseth as Hunter
- Shioli Kutsuna as Ms. T
- Aoi Yamada as Ms. S
- Dougray Scott as Johnny Thunders
- Diego Calva as Nico
- Hidetoshi Nishijima as Hayashi
- Parker Sawyers as Frank

== Production ==
After creating a pair of limited series, Too Old to Die Young for Amazon Prime Video and Copenhagen Cowboy for Netflix, Nicolas Winding Refn began work on his next feature film, his first since 2016's The Neon Demon. In an interview with Variety in August 2024, he said that he planned on shooting the film in Tokyo, with English and Japanese being the primary spoken languages of the project.

In April 2025, Neon and Refn announced the project, describing it as "something groovy", with the title Her Private Hell being revealed. It was financed by Neon and produced by Refn under his production company byNWR. The main cast was also announced, with Sophie Thatcher and Charles Melton in lead roles, alongside Kristine Froseth and Havana Rose Liu. Dougray Scott, Shioli Kutsuna, Diego Calva, Aoi Yamada and Hidetoshi Nishijima was also cast.

Principal photography took place in Copenhagen over 57 days from May to July 2025. The film was in post-production by March 2026. Pino Donaggio created the original score, marking his first collaboration with Refn.

== Release ==
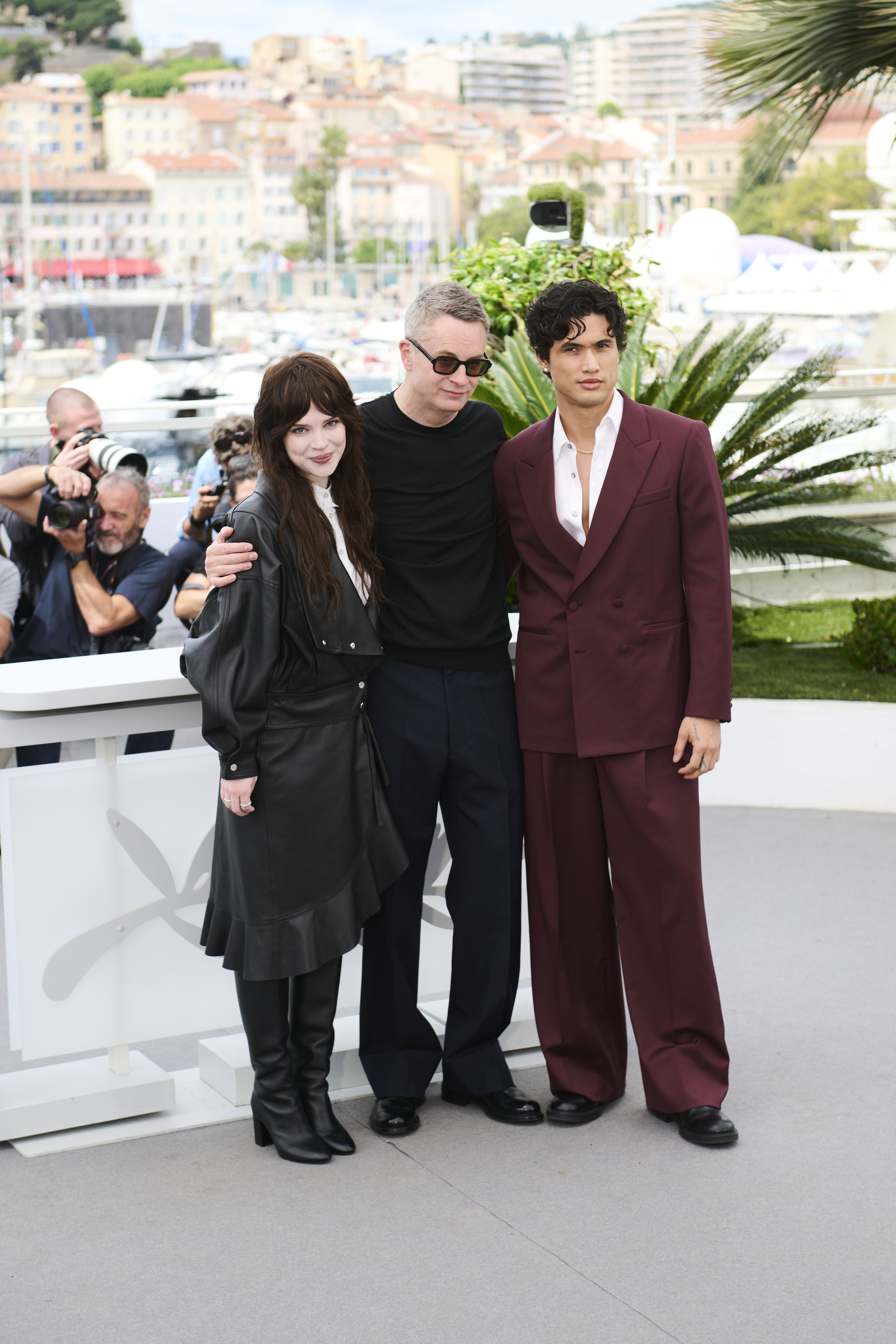
Sophie Thatcher, Nicolas Winding Refn and Charles Melton at the 2026 Cannes Film Festival

Her Private Hell was presented out of competition at the 79th Cannes Film Festival on 18 May 2026, receiving between a 7 to 12-minute standing ovation. However, there were some walkouts throughout the screening, allegedly due to boredom. It was also screened as the opening night film at the 30th Fantasia International Film Festival on 16 July 2026, and had its UK premiere at the 79th Edinburgh International Film Festival on 16 August 2026.

It was screened in Sitges Collection on 8 October 2026 at the 59th Sitges Film Festival,

It was theatrically released in the United States by Neon on 24 July 2026, with plans to be shown across 800–1,200 screens. It was ultimately shown on 675 screens. Scanbox Entertainment released the film in Denmark on 15 October.

In March 2026, Mubi acquired distribution rights from Neon International for the United Kingdom and Ireland, Italy, Spain, and Latin America.

== Reception ==
=== Box office ===
It grossed $530k in its opening weekend in the United States, across 675 screens.

=== Critical response ===
On the review aggregator website Rotten Tomatoes, 41% of 121 critics' reviews are positive, with an average rating of 5.1/10. The website's consensus reads: "Intoxicating in style but saddled with pacing that feels like purgatory, Her Private Hell is a take-it-or-leave-it proposition from Nicolas Winding Refn that the unconverted will happily decline." Metacritic, which uses a weighted average, assigned the film a score of 44 out of 100, based on 31 critics, indicating "mixed or average" reviews.

In a positive review for TheWrap, Chase Hutchinson deemed Thatcher's performance her "most daring yet", comparing it to Jack Nicholson's performance in The Shining at times. He also warned viewers that if they disliked Refn's past work, they "will likely be incredibly put off and alienated by everything playing out". Jordan Mintzer from The Hollywood Reporter wrote, "NWR does give us a warning early on when he has one of his characters only half-ironically claim: 'This movie's gonna be hell.' But that doesn't make watching Her Private Hell any less hellish". He did praise the lead cast performances, cinematography, production design, and homages to classic slasher directors like Dario Argento and Brian De Palma.

Owen Gleiberman of Variety wrote, "Her Private Hell is a disaster, but even that's part of its hipster factor. The film practically announces that it's too cool to be coherent".
