= Burn (2026 film) =

Film by Makoto Nagahisa

- Theatrical poster
- 炎上
- Directed by: Makoto Nagahisa
- Written by: Makoto Nagahisa
- Produced by: Kazunori Seki; Yasuo Suzuki
- Starring: Nana Mori
- Cinematography: Hiroaki Takeda
- Edited by: Shunichi Sone
- Music by: Riko Iwai
- Distributed by: Nakachika Pictures; Cinetic Media
- Release date: 10 April 2026 (Japan)
- Running time: 103 minutes
- Country: Japan
- Language: Japanese

Burn (Japanese: 炎上, also stylized in all caps) is a 2026 Japanese coming-of-age teen drama film. It is written and directed by Makoto Nagahisa from an original screenplay. It stars Nana Mori in her first solo leading role.

The film premiered at the 2026 Sundance Film Festival. The film opened in Japan on 10 April. In the three days following its release, the film was a huge success, selling out many theaters in Tokyo, Osaka, and Hakata.

== Synopsis ==
Jurie Kobayashi’s parents belong to a cult. She and her sister grew up suffering severe abuse from their father, especially when Jurie stutters. After ten years of nightly praying for his death, the father suddenly dies. However, after his death, her mother begins to abuse them. Unable to bear it any longer, Jurie runs away from home without her sister.

Many scenes occur at and near Kabukicho's Toyoko Square.

Jurie reaches Kabukicho's Toyoko Square (Note: Also known as Cine City Square) across from the Shinjuku Toho Building and the Godzilla head. There she meets Kami (Note: The dictionary definition of kami at Wiktionary and The dictionary definition of かみ at Wiktionary) and his group of Toyoko kids. When she tries to introduce herself as "Jurie," she stutters and is given the nickname "Ju-Ju". They live together in a room provided by Kami at a Kabukicho business hotel. They hang out in the square, take sleeping pills that Kami provides, and frequently use flame emojis in their text chats. One gender fluid group member who is prone to self-harm, Wris, befriends Ju-Ju.

One night, Ju-Ju overdoses on the street, passes out, and the police assume custody. They place Ju-Ju in a temporary shelter. There, she makes friends with Mitsuba, a girl with a severe limp. Two months later, Ju-Ju and Mitsuba escape from the facility by stealing bicycles.

They return to Toyoko Square and are greeted by her friends. Mitsuba had also been part of Kami's group. At Mitsuba's urging, Ju-Ju begins "sugar dating". (Note: compensated dating for sexual favors) Mitsuba works out of a host club. Hikari, her host, seduces her into spending her sugar dating money. Ju-Ju loses her virginity to her first client, and takes a pink, glittery vibrator that he leaves behind. Ju-Ju plans to earn "1000 stars," or 10 million yen, from sugar dating and use that money to rescue her younger sister. Working together with Mitsuba, Ju-Ju has relationships with 548 men in three months, folding the 10,000 yen bills she receives so that only Shibusawa Eiichi’s (Note: Shibusawa Eiichi is depicted on the 10,000 yen note § Series F) face is visible, and placing them in a nearby coin-operated locker.

Kami tells Ju-Ju that A-Q, his driver, has feelings for her. Ju-Ju has Wris apply "landmine makeup" to her face and goes to meet A-Q. Wris calls Ju-Ju, but A-Q tells her to ignore the call. Immediately afterward, Wris then jumps from a window of a building across from the Shinjuku Toho Building. The reason for the suicide remains unknown, but Kami had been supplying Wris with star-shaped drugs to sell, which Wris had also started using. About the same time, Mitsuba disappears from Toyoko Square.

Ju-Ju. who has continued her sugar dating activities alone and finally achieved "1000 stars," encounters Mitsuba again. Mitsuba is pregnant through sugar dating by an unknown father. Mitsuba self-aborts alone in a public restroom. Mitsuba confronts Hikari by claiming that she aborted his child, but he coldly rejects her and she goes mad.

Ju-Ju opens the coin locker where she had stashed the money, but it is empty. Ju-Ju finds Mitsuba at a karaoke bar and questions her, about the missing 10 million yen, but Mitsuba evades the question and dismisses her plan to rescue her sister as lame. Enraged, Ju-Ju bludgeons Mitsuba to death with the glittery vibrator she has with her. The beating is intercut with shots of Ju-Ju’s parents beating her. Coming to her senses, Ju-Ju calls Kami for help. He arrives with A-Q and gives Ju-Ju a star-shaped drug. Ju-Ju passes out

When Ju-Ju regains consciousness, she is lying on a cardboard box spread out in the Toyoko Square with no panties. A large amount of 10,000 yen bills rains down from the skyscrapers, and the Toyoko kids laugh as they pick up the money. In her hazy state of consciousness, Ju-Ju watches and also hallucinates her father appearing before her. Ju-Ju lights the vibrator and thrusts it at her father, seemingly setting the entire scene on fire. Toyoko Square becomes engulfed in pink glitter and flames.

When Ju-Ju reawakens, she is in a hospital bed wrapped in bandages. A policewoman, who has been waiting by Ju-Ju’s bedside, returns her smartphone. When Ju-Ju opens her phone, she finds a chat message from her younger sister asking "Are you alive, big sister?" Ju-Ju replies with a flame emoji.

== Cast ==
- Nana Mori as Jurie "Ju-Ju" Kobayashi
- Kanji Furutachi as Jurie's father
- Nao Matsuzaki as Jurie's mother
- Chise Niitsu as Jurie's sister
- Wataru Ichinose as Kami
- Ryōsuke Sota as Wris
- Aoi Yamada as Mitsuba
- Reona Hirota as Masumi
- Kanata Mori as A-Q
- Hiroya Shimizu as Hikari

== Production ==
The writer/director Nagahisa conducted interviews of actual Toyoko kids and used the results in creating the characters in the film. Once she was cast as the main character, Nana Mori moved to Kabukicho and attempted to live a lifestyle close to that of the Toyoko kids, even eating a similar diet.

The film was shot in the same location of many of the narrative locations, such as Toyoko Square and in nearby business hotels, host clubs and karaoke boxes. There were problems with sound spillage from nearby that required much re-recording.

Although some scenes appeared to be shot with hidden cameras, there was no such subterfuge as Nagahisa has stated that they did nothing illegal, and that "All the people you see on screen are actually skilled extras."

== Reception ==
Burn premiered on 25 January 2026 at the 2026 Sundance Film Festival. Most American reviews occurred directly after the festival. Reviewers who graded the film gave it 2½ and 5 stars, B−, A−, and 6/10. Brian Tallerico of RogerEbert.com wrote: "Nagahisa maintains a strong visual language, and a commitment to refusing to turn Ju-Ju into a device. Mori is very good at balancing this child’s innocence with a world that commodifies it." Karen Benardello wrote that "Burn thrives on being a visceral experience that grips through both visual bravura and emotional honesty. It marks a significant statement from Nagahisa, reinforcing his reputation for combining formal inventiveness with empathetic storytelling."

In the three days after its Japan opening on 10 April 2026, audiences flocked to the film, with sold-out screenings at theaters throughout Tokyo, and all screenings in Shinjuku and Shimokitazawa sold out on a single day. Osaka and Hakata theaters also sold out.

== Awards and nominations ==
- 2026 Seattle International Film Festival § Juried Competition Awards, Official Competition Special Jury Mention, recognized as the Feel Bad Film of the Year
