= Natsuki Deguchi =

Japanese actress and model (born 2001)

- Deguchi in 2026
- Born: October 4, 2001 (age 25); Fujian, China
- Occupations: Actress; model
- Years active: 2018–present
- Hometown: Tokyo, Japan
- Agent: Incent
- Modeling information
- Height: 162 cm (5 ft 4 in)
- Hair color: black
- Eye color: brown

Japanese name
- Kanji: 出口 夏希
- Hiragana: でぐち なつき
Transcriptions
- Romanization: Deguchi Natsuki

Natsuki Deguchi (出口 夏希, Deguchi Natsuki; born October 4, 2001) is a Japanese actress and model who is affiliated with Incent.

== Biography ==
Natsuki Deguchi was born on October 4, 2001, in Fujian, China to a Chinese mother and Japanese father. She is the fourth of five siblings, with three elder sisters and one younger brother, and they were raised in Tokyo, Japan.

Deguchi is bilingual; she can speak both Chinese and Japanese, with the former specifically being the Hokkien topolect from Fujian Province, which she generally only speaks at home.

== Career ==
While at Miyamasuzaka, Shibuya, with a friend, she was scouted by an Incent staff. Deguchi had previously been scouted by several other agencies before [to which she all declined], but admiring actress and model Mizuki Yamamoto, whom she heard was from the agency, she accepted the offer. She debuted in March 2018. Her first job after joining Incent was a photo shoot for the fast fashion brand "Shimamura". She applied and participated in the "Miss Seventeen 2018" sponsored by Shueisha, and showcased her fluent Chinese in an appeal video by the final candidates.

On August 23, it was announced at the 2018 Seventeen Summer School Festival held at Pacifico Yokohama National Hall that six contestants, including Deguchi, had been selected as "Miss Seventeen 2018". With Suzu Hirose "graduating" as the exclusive model for the said magazine at the end of the event, the six Miss Seventeen candidates took part in an interview photo shoot.

Deguchi was selected as the "HARUTA IMAGE GIRL 2019", they made photo collages of various clothing items incorporating loafers that was then later published in Seventeen and on Haruta's official website. She starred in her first television appearance in the TV drama Cocoa, which aired in January 2019, it was a drama adaptation of the grand prize winning work of the 30th Fuji Television Young Scenario Awards, with an omnibus format which follows three high school girls played by Sara Minami, Deguchi, and Riko Nagase as the main characters. In the second episode of the TV drama Love Sickness and the Guys in BS Nippon Television, which began airing in July of the same year, she appeared as the middle school classmate of the main character played by Ryuga Sato.

In April 2021, She appeared regularly in two dramas: Girl Gun Lady in Mainichi Broadcasting and Kotaro Lives Alone in TV Asahi.

In December 2020, she made her very first movie appearance as the young Isabella in the movie The Promised Neverland. On July 22, 2022, with the summer issue of Seventeen released, after four years, she "graduated" from being their exclusive model. On September 16 of the same year, she made another appearance in the movie Silent Parade, playing the role of Natsumi Namiki. She then became an exclusive model for women's fashion magazine Non-no for the December issue which was released on October 20.

She co-starred with Nana Mori in the original drama The Makanai: Cooking for the Maiko House scheduled to be released on Netflix on January 13, 2023, Deguchi plays the role of Sumire, marking her first lead role in a drama. Her first photo book entitled liberte was released on March 24, 2023. In the same year, she was also cast as the lead role of Futaba Yoshioka in the two-season live action television adaptation of the shōjo manga Blue Spring Ride.

Deguchi at a Bioré photocall in 2026

In May 2025, Deguchi starred in the film I Have a S/e/c/r/e/t/. Then, in 2026, she reprised the role of Futaba Yoshioka – a character from her earlier work – in the second season of the television adaptation of the manga Strobe Edge.

== Filmography ==
=== Film ===
Year	Title	Role	Notes	Ref.
2020	The Promised Neverland	Isabella (young)		
2022	Silent Parade	Natsumi Namiki		
2023	Till We Meet Again on the Lily Hill	Chiyo		
2024	Drawing Closer	Haruna Sakurai		
2024	Honeko Akabane's Bodyguards	Honeko Akabane		
2025	I Have a S/e/c/r/e/t/	Naoko Miki	Lead role	
2026	All Greens	Miruku Yaguchi	Lead role	
2026	Till We Meet Again on the Starry Hill	Chiyo		
2026	Kyojo: Requiem	Towako Oikake		
2026	Look Back	Ayumu Fujino	Lead role	
2026	Your Story: Kimi No Hanashi	Toka		
2027	Leviathan	Futaba Nikaido		

=== Television ===
Year	Title	Role	Notes	Ref.
2019	Hakusen		Lead role; short web series	
2019	Protagonist	Yuna Hara		
2019	Cocoa	Kaori Suzumori	Lead role	
2019	Love Sickness and the Guys	Yuri Kuraki	Episode 2	
2020	Switch	Madoka Tsutaya (young)	Television film	
2020	Unsung Cinderella: Midori, The Hospital Pharmacist	Hasegawa Airi	Episode 7	
2020	Curry Song	Madoka Mori	Lead role	
2020	30-Kin: A Love Story That's Forbidden for Those Under 30	Megumi Iami		
2021	Girl Gun Lady	Akiho Inada		
2021	Kotaro Lives Alone	Tōko Futaba		
2021	Is Professor Hanawa Still a Half-Baked Person!?	Tōko Futaba		
2022	My Love from the Star	Sasahara Tsubaki (young) / Kiyo		
2022	Inversion	Kotone Imabata		
2022	The Makanai: Cooking for the Maiko House	Sumire / Momohana	Lead role	
2022	First Kiss Boys	Ririna Miyama		
2022	Crescendo	Fujita		
2023	Kimi ga Suki.mp4	Natsuki		
2023	My Worst Friend	Ema Honjo		
2023	18/40: Unbreakable Bond of Dreams	Sena Nishimura		
2023–24	Ao Haru Ride	Futaba Yoshioka	Lead role; 2 seasons	
2024	The Gift of Your Heart	Haruhi Asano		
2024	Blue Moment	Aya Kumeda		
2025	Always the Ultimate Choice	Mysterious woman	Short web series	
2025	True Horror Stories: Summer 2025	Mai Kasama	Lead role; short drama	
2026	Strobe Edge	Futaba Yoshioka	Season 2	
2026	The Devil's Hand-Drum Song	Satoko Aoike		
2026	Canned Mackerel Heads to Space	Nami Sugawara		

=== Music video appearances ===
Year released, name of the artist, and title of the song
Year	Artist	Title	Ref.
2018	Skirt	"Distant Spring"	
2020	Hana Sekitori	"Give me the Present"	
2020	Crybaby	"Nemonaire"	
2021	Transistory Project	"Sparkler in Love with a Ghost"	
2023	Gre4n Boyz	"Forget-me-not"	
2025	Tota	"Hypnosis"	
2025	Niko Niko Tan Tan	"Stranger"	

=== Commercials ===
- Vieris Co., Ltd. "Kireimo" (March 10, 2021)
- Mister Donut Sweet Potato Do "Sweetness is oozing. Secret Potato Do" (August 27, 2021)
- Coca-Cola Japan Sokenbicha "Forward Me" (May 29, 2023)
- Ajinomoto Hondashi "Hondashi Shopkeeper" (September 19, 2023)

== Bibliography ==
=== Magazine ===
- Seventeen (October 2018 issue - Summer 2022 issue, Shueisha) - Exclusive model
- Non-no (December 2022 issue, Shueisha) - Exclusive model

=== Photobooks ===
- liberte (KADOKAWA, on March 24, 2023)

== Awards and nominations ==
Year	Award	Category	Work(s)	Result	Ref.
2025	46th Yokohama Film Festival	Best Newcomer	Honeko Akabane's Bodyguards	Won	
2025	Elle Cinema Awards 2025	ElleGirl Rising Star	I Have a S/e/c/r/e/t/	Won	
2026	18th Tama Film Awards	Best New Actress	Look Back	Won	
