= Kayo Noro =

Japanese singer and entertainer (born 1983)

- 野呂 佳代
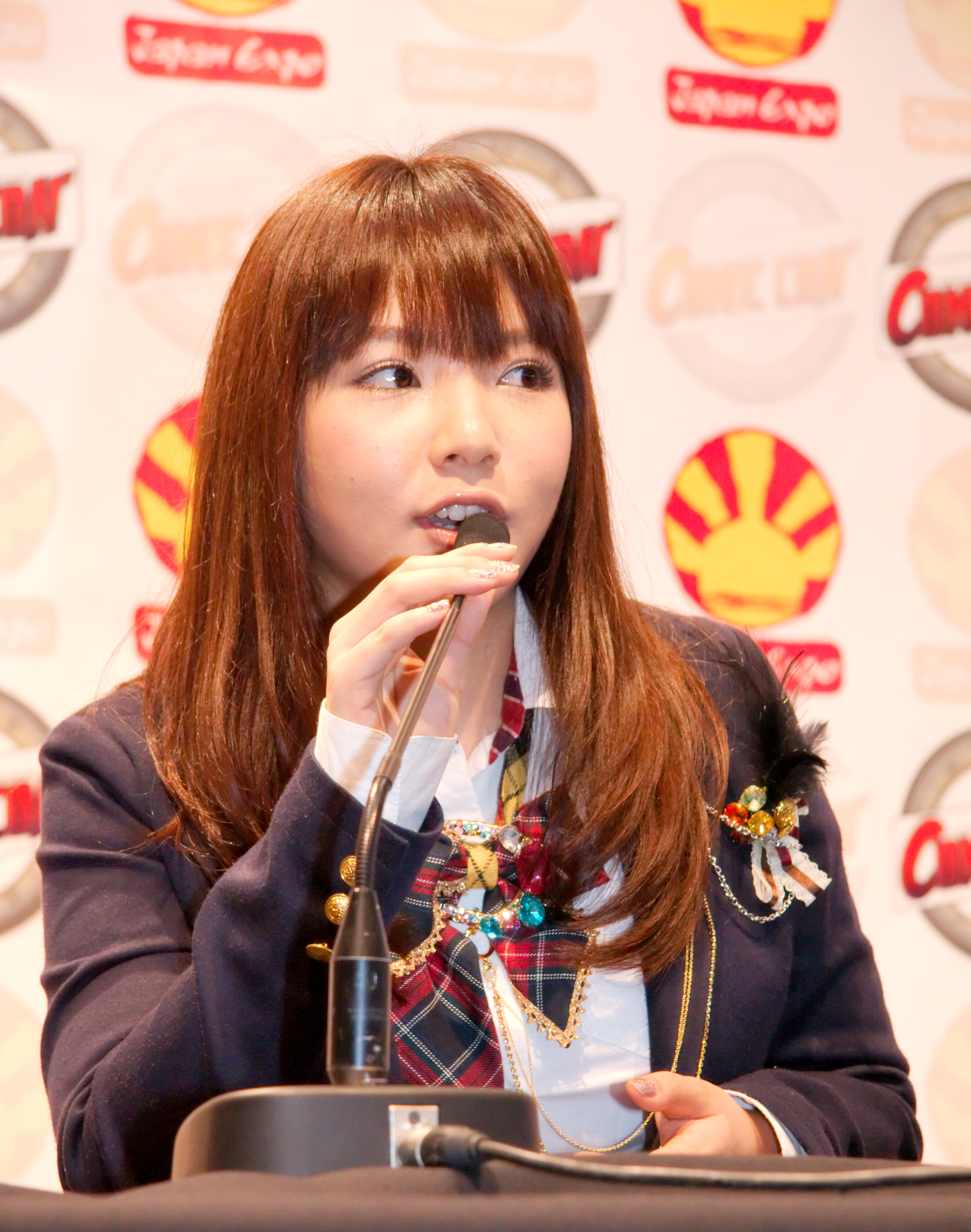
- Noro at the Japan Expo in 2009.
- Born: October 28, 1983 (age 43); Itabashi, Tokyo, Japan
- Other names: Kayo Asakura (former stage name); Nonti (ノンティー, Nontī); Kayoho (かよほー); Kap (キャップ, Kyappu)
- Occupations: Singer; entertainer
- Years active: 2000–present
- Agent: Ohta Production
- Spouse: Unknown (m. 2020)
- Musical career
- Instrument: Voice
- Years active: 2006–2012
- Formerly of: AKB48

Kayo Noro (野呂 佳代, Noro Kayo; born October 28, 1983, in Itabashi, Tokyo, Japan) is a Japanese singer and entertainer who is represented by the talent agency, Ohta Production. She is a former member of idol groups AKB48 and SDN48. She was a 1st Generation captain in SDN48. Her former stage name was Kayo Asakura (朝倉 佳代, Asakura Kayo).

== Personal life ==
On November 22, 2020, Noro announced her marriage to a TV director.

== Filmography ==
=== Television ===
Year	Title	Role	Notes	Ref.
2023	Angel Flight	Minori Matsushima		
2024	Dear Radiance	Nui	Taiga drama	
2024–27	Unmet: A Neurosurgeon's Diary	Takako Narimasu	2 seasons	
2025	The Hot Spot	Kozue Nakamoto		
2026	Reboot	Hitomi Kuwahara		
2026	The Light We Cast	Akari Tsukioka		
2026	Plastic Beauty			

=== Films ===
Year	Title	Role	Notes	Ref.
2026	The Brightest Sun			
2026	Angel Flight: The Movie	Minori Matsushima		
2026	Sheep in the Box	Kasumi		
2026	Bayside Shakedown: N.E.W	Futaba Kogure		
2026	Look Back	Fujino's mother		
2027	The Tiger and Her Wings: The Movie	Chizuru Iwakura		

=== Stage ===
Year	Title	Role	Notes	Ref.
2021	Uragiri no Bansan			

=== Dubbing ===
- Elio (OOOOO)
