= Nana Mori =

Japanese actress (born 2001)

- 森 七菜
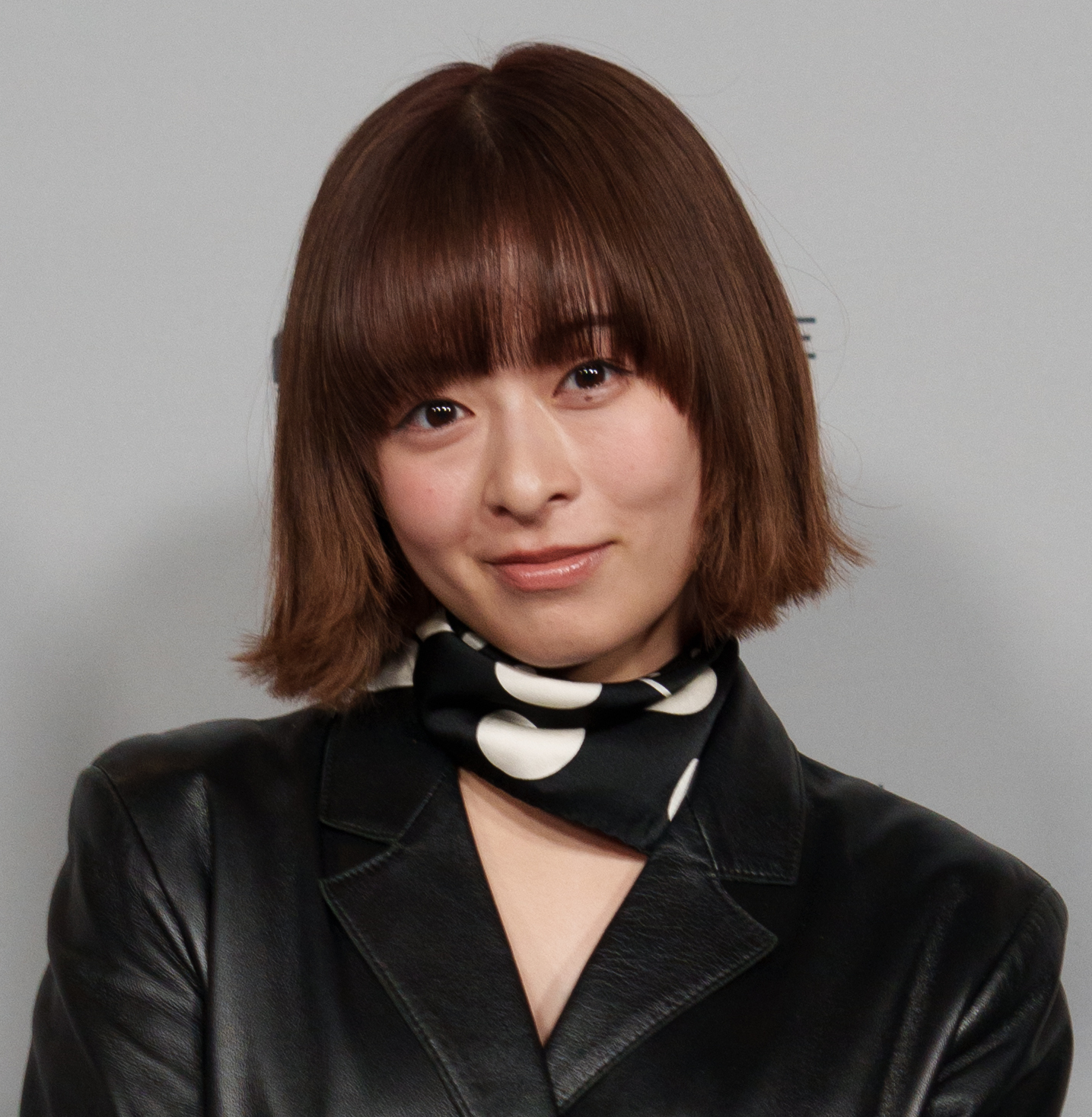
- Mori at the Burn premiere at Sundance 2026
- Born: August 31, 2001 (age 25); Osaka Prefecture, Japan
- Occupation: Actress
- Years active: 2016–present
- Agent: Sony Music Artists

Nana Mori (森 七菜, Mori Nana; born August 31, 2001) is a Japanese actress.

== Biography ==
Mori was born in Osaka on August 31, 2001 and brought up in Ōita. In 2016, she was scouted by the talent agency ARBRE. In 2019, she had a leading role for Makoto Shinkai's anime film Weathering with You. In 2020, Mori rapidly gained recognition with a string of high-profile roles, including appearances in Shunji Iwai's film Last Letter and the NHK morning drama Yell. She had a first starring role in a television drama with A Warmed Up Love. For her work during this period, she was honored with the Elan d'or Award for Newcomer of the Year. In 2021, she signed a contract with SMA (Sony Music Artists). In 2023, she took the lead role in the Netflix series The Makanai: Cooking for the Maiko House, directed by Hirokazu Kore-eda. In 2025, she challenged herself with her first-ever intimate scene in the film Kokuho. She also had many English-language lines in the film Frontline: Yokohama Bay. That year proved to be highly successful, with all four of her film appearances becoming box-office hits, each surpassing ¥1.5 billion in revenue.

== Filmography ==
=== Film ===
Year	Title	Role	Notes	Ref.
2017	The Anthem of the Heart	Young Natsuki Nitō		
2019	Weathering with You	Hina Amano (voice)	Lead role	
2019	Tokyo Ghoul S	Yoriko Kosaka		
2019	The First Supper	Young Miyako		
2019	Hell Girl	Miho Ichikawa		
2020	Last Letter	Soyoka Kishibeno / young Yūri		
2020	Blue, Painful, Fragile	Mizuki Nishiyama		
2020	461 Days of Bento: A Promise Between Father and Son	Hiromi Nishina		
2021	Liar × Liar	Minato Takatsuki	Lead role	
2023	Insomniacs After School	Isaki Magari	Lead role	
2023	Father of the Milky Way Railroad	Toshi Miyazawa		
2024	Don't Lose Your Head!	Narrator		
2024	April Come She Will	Haru Iyoda		
2024	The Parades	Nana		
2024	At the Bench		Lead role; anthology film	
2025	1st Kiss	Anri Segi		
2025	Kokuho	Akiko		
2025	Frontline: Yokohama Bay	Hiroko Hatori		
2025	5 Centimeters per Second	Kanae Sumida		
2026	Burn	Jurie "Juju" Kobayashi	Lead role	
2026	Beasts Clutching at Straws	Sheena		

=== Television ===
Year	Title	Role	Notes	Ref.
2017	Tokyo Vampire Hotel	Akari		
2017	My High School Business	Yui Ichinose		
2019	Mr. Hiiragi's Homeroom	Runa Horibe		
2019	Shōnen Torajirō	Satoko		
2019	Nippon Noir	Runa Horibe		
2020	Yell	Ume Sekiuchi	Asadora	
2020	A Warmed Up Love	Kiki Inoue	Lead role	
2020	I Had a Dream of That Person	Herself		
2021	Tales of the Unusual: Fall 2021	Asuka Miyamoto	Lead role; short drama	
2022	Duty and Revenge	Mikako Sawai		
2022	The Forbidden Magic	Yurina Kurasaka	Television film	
2023	The Makanai: Cooking for the Maiko House	Kiyo	Lead role	
2023	Cinderella of Midsummer	Natsumi Aoi	Lead role	
2024	True Horror Stories: 25th-year anniversary special	Shiori Tōyama	Lead role; short drama	
2025	Hirayasumi	Natsumi Kobayashi		
2026	Rock Paper Landmine	Mato Imoriya	Lead role	
2027	Mr. Mystery?	Miori Kamiya		

=== Radio work ===
Year	Title	Network	Notes	Ref(s)
2021–2023	School of Lock!	Tokyo FM	In charge of "Girls Locks!"	

== Discography ==
=== Singles ===
List of singles, with selected chart positions, showing year released, sales, and certifications
Title	Year	Peak chart positions		Sales	Certifications	Album
Title	Year	JPN	JPN Hot	Sales	Certifications	Album
"Kaeru no Uta" (カエルノウタ)	2020	26	44	JPN: 2,181 (phy.)		Non-album single
"Smile" (スマイル)	2020	—	61		RIAJ: Silver (st.)	Non-album single
"Shinkai" (深海)	2021	—	—			Non-album single

== Awards and nominations ==
Year	Award	Category	Nominated work(s)	Result	Ref.
2020	74th Mainichi Film Awards	Best New Actress	Hell Girl	Nominated	
2020	14th Seiyu Awards	Best Rookie Actress	Weathering with You	Won	
2020	45th Hochi Film Awards	Best New Artist	Last Letter	Nominated	
2020	33rd Nikkan Sports Film Awards	Best Newcomer	Last Letter and others	Nominated	
2021	42nd Yokohama Film Festival	Best Newcomer	Last Letter and others	Won	
2021	75th Mainichi Film Awards	Best New Actress	Last Letter	Nominated	
2021	63rd Blue Ribbon Awards	Best Newcomer	Last Letter	Nominated	
2021	44th Japan Academy Film Prize	Newcomer of the Year	Last Letter	Won	
2021	45th Elan d'or Awards	Newcomer of the Year	Herself	Won	
2021	46th Hochi Film Awards	Best Actress	Liar × Liar	Nominated	
2021	46th Hochi Film Awards	Best New Artist	Liar × Liar	Nominated	
2025	38th Nikkan Sports Film Awards	Best Supporting Actress	Kokuho and 5 Centimeters per Second	Nominated	
2026	68th Blue Ribbon Awards	Best Supporting Actress	Kokuho and Frontline: Yokohama Bay	Nominated	
2026	49th Japan Academy Film Prize	Best Supporting Actress	Kokuho	Nominated	
