= The Makanai: Cooking for the Maiko House =

Japanese television series

- Promotional release poster
- Based on: Kiyo in Kyoto by Aiko Koyama
- Written by: Hirokazu Kore-eda
- Screenplay by: Mami Sunada
- Directed by: Hirokazu Kore-eda
- Starring: Nana Mori; Natsuki Deguchi; Aju Makita
- Composer: Yoko Kanno
- Country of origin: Japan
- Original language: Japanese
- No. of episodes: 9

Production
- Producers: Genki Kawamura; Kenji Yamada
- Cinematography: Ryuto Kondo
- Production companies: Bunkuku; Story Inc.

Original release
- Network: Netflix
- Release: January 12, 2023

The Makanai: Cooking for the Maiko House (舞妓さんちのまかないさん) is a Japanese television series based on the manga Kiyo in Kyoto about contemporary life in a geisha house. The series stars Nana Mori, Natsuki Deguchi, and Aju Makita, and was released by Netflix on January 12, 2023. Hirokazu Kore-eda served as director, writer, and showrunner, The Makanai being his first time directing a Netflix production.

== Background ==
The series is based on the manga Kiyo in Kyoto, which ran from 2016 to 2025 and was adapted into a 12-episode TV anime series in 2021.

== Plot ==
Best friends Kiyo (Mori) and Sumire (Deguchi) move from their hometown in northern Aomori to Kyoto's Gion district to live in an all-female house of geiko and maiko with dreams of becoming geiko themselves. Though Sumire is hailed as an exemplary talent, Kiyo is deemed unfit to become a maiko but soon finds her unexpected calling as their live-in cook.

== Episodes ==
No.	Title
1	"Change"; Transliteration: "Kaeru" (Japanese: 変える)
2	"Guardian Spirit"; Transliteration: "Otafuku" (Japanese: お多福)
3	"Taboo"; Transliteration: "Kinki" (Japanese: 禁忌)
4	"Wish"; Transliteration: "Negai" (Japanese: 願い)
5	"Choice"; Transliteration: "Sentaku" (Japanese: 選択)
6	"One-sided"; Transliteration: "Kataomoi" (Japanese: 片思い)
7	"Illness"; Transliteration: "Yamai hi" (Japanese: 病日)
8	"Carnival"; Transliteration: "Obake" (Japanese: お化け)
9	"Passage"; Transliteration: "Kadode" (Japanese: 門出)

== Cast ==
- Nana Mori as Kiyo, a would-be maiko applicant from Aomori who is rejected for the role but ends up cooking for the Saku House
- Natsuki Deguchi as Sumire/Momohana, Kiyo's long-time companion and best friend who succeeds in becoming a maiko
- Aju Makita as Ryoko, Mother Azusa's daughter who also lives in the Saku House
- Takako Tokiwa as Mother Azusa, the co-proprietor of the Saku House
- Keiko Matsuzaka as Mother Chiyo, the co-proprietor of the Saku House
- Ai Hashimoto as Momoko, a veteran geiko who takes in Sumire as her apprentice
- Mayu Matsuoka as Yoshino, a former geiko who returns to the Saku House to resume her career after divorcing her husband
- Momoko Fukuchi as Tsurukoma, a maiko at the Saku House who quits the profession at the end of the series
- Lily Franky as Mr. Ren, the bartender
- Kotona Minami as Kotono, fellow maiko

== Production ==
Kore-eda directed the first two episodes, with the remaining seven directed by Megumi Tsuno, Hiroshi Okuyama, and Takuma Sato.

=== Depictions of geisha ===
Previous portrayals of geisha and their milieu, such as Arthur Golden's Memoirs of a Geisha and its film adaptation, have been criticised for conflating geisha culture with a form of "highly-stylized prostitution". The popularity of the film led to a surge in tourists in the geisha districts of Kyoto, instances of harassment of geisha in public, and a 2019 ban of photographing geisha implemented by the Gion geisha district. Kore-eda commented that the series might dispel some inaccurate beliefs perpetuated by Memoirs, such as maiko being sold by their parents. However, Kiyo's work as a makanai, the in-house cook and helper, is also unrealistic; there are no teenage makanai.
