= Tohoku University of Art and Design =

Art school in Yamagata, Japan

Coordinates: 38°13′06″N 140°20′44″E

- 東北芸術工科大学
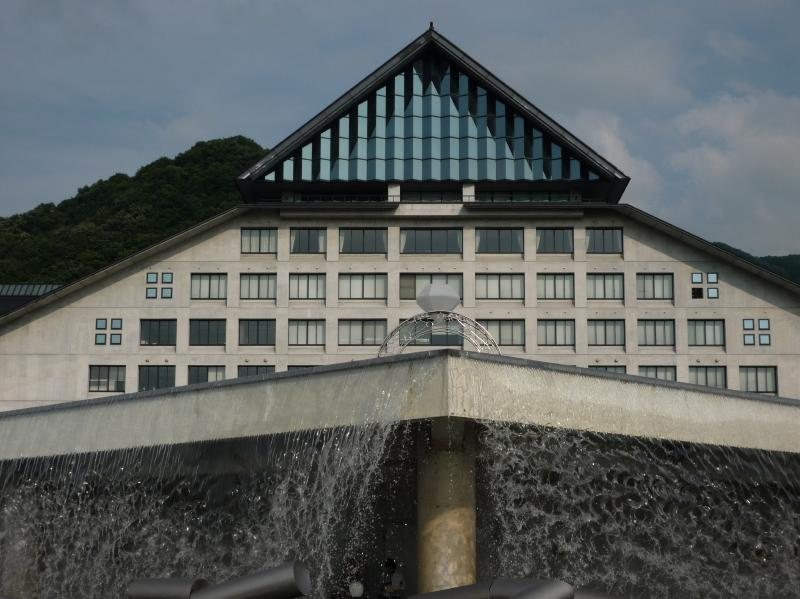
- Type: Private
- Established: 1992
- Location: Yamagata, Yamagata, Japan

Tohoku University of Art and Design (東北芸術工科大学, Tōhoku geijutsu kōka daigaku) is a private university in Yamagata, Yamagata, Japan. Established in April 1992 by the governments of Yamagata Prefecture and Yamagata City, it was the first university in Japan to be built with government funds and then turned over to be operated as an entirely private institution. The university offers undergraduate and graduate programs through its Faculty of Arts and Design Engineering departments.

== History ==
Established in April 1992 by the governments of Yamagata Prefecture and Yamagata City, the Tohoku University of Art and Design is the first venture of its kind in Japan where a university built with funds by the government has been turned over to be operated as an entirely private university.

== Faculty ==
=== Undergraduate ===
- Faculty of Arts
  - Department of Literature
  - Art history, cultural heritage preservation and restoration department (painting restoration, sculpture restoration, conservation science, art history)
  - Department of historical heritage (history, archeology, folklore and anthropology)
  - Art Department
    - Comprehensive art course
    - Japanese painting course
    - Movie course
    - Printmaking course
    - Sculpture course
      - Crafts (Pottery, metalwork, lacquer) course
      - Textiles course
  - Design Engineering
    - Department of Product Design (product design, furniture and interior design)
    - Architecture and Environmental Design Department (architectural design, landscape design, renovation, sustainable design, ecological design)
    - Department of Graphic Design
    - Video Department
    - Department of planning conception

=== Graduate ===
- Graduate School of Arts and Engineering
  - Arts and Engineering (Doctoral Program)
  - Department of Arts and Culture (Master's Program)
  - Design Engineering (Master's program)

== Notable alumni ==
- Tatsuki Fujimoto, manga artist
