= 44th Japan Academy Film Prize =

Japanese film awards in 2021

- Date: March 19, 2021
- Site: Grand Prince Hotel New Takanawa, Tokyo, Japan
- Hosted by: Shinichi Hatori; Shim Eun-kyung

Highlights
- Most awards: Fukushima 50 (6)
- Most nominations: Fukushima 50 (12)

The 44th Japan Academy Film Prize (第44回日本アカデミー賞) is the 44th edition of the Japan Academy Film Prize, an award presented by the Nippon Academy-Sho Association to award excellence in filmmaking.

== Winners and nominees ==
=== Awards ===
Picture of the Year	Animation of the Year
Midnight Swan; The Asadas; Tora-san, Wish You Were Here; The Voice of Sin; Fukushima 50	Demon Slayer: Kimetsu no Yaiba – The Movie: Mugen Train; Violet Evergarden: The Movie; Poupelle of Chimney Town; Josee, the Tiger and the Fish; Stand by Me Doraemon 2
Director of the Year	Screenplay of the Year
Setsurō Wakamatsu – Fukushima 50; Eiji Uchida – Midnight Swan; Naomi Kawase – True Mothers; Nobuhiro Doi – The Voice of Sin; Ryōta Nakano – The Asadas	Akiko Nogi – The Voice of Sin; Eiji Uchida – Midnight Swan; Ryōta Nakano and Tomoe Kanno – The Asadas; Yōichi Maekawa – Fukushima 50; Yoji Yamada – Tora-san, Wish You Were Here
Outstanding Performance by an Actor in a Leading Role	Outstanding Performance by an Actress in a Leading Role
Tsuyoshi Kusanagi – Midnight Swan; Shun Oguri – The Voice of Sin; Kōichi Satō – Fukushima 50; Masaki Suda – Threads: Our Tapestry of Love; Kazunari Ninomiya – The Asadas	Masami Nagasawa – Mother; Nana Komatsu – Threads: Our Tapestry of Love; Hiromi Nagasaku – True Mothers; Masami Nagasawa – The Confidence Man JP: Episode of the Princess; Chieko Baisho – Tora-san, Wish You Were Here; Suzu Hirose – Not Quite Dead Yet
Outstanding Performance by an Actor in a Supporting Role	Outstanding Performance by an Actress in a Supporting Role
Ken Watanabe – Fukushima 50; Shōhei Uno – The Voice of Sin; Satoshi Tsumabuki – The Asadas; Ryo Narita – The Cornered Mouse Dreams of Cheese; Gen Hoshino – The Voice of Sin	Haru Kuroki – The Asadas; Noriko Eguchi – Stigmatized Properties; Kumiko Goto – Tora-san, Wish You Were Here; Kaori Momoi – I Never Shot Anyone; Narumi Yasuda – Fukushima 50
Outstanding Foreign Language Film	Newcomer of the Year
Parasite; Star Wars: The Rise of Skywalker; Ford v Ferrari; 1917; Tenet	Misaki Hattori – Midnight Swan; Aju Makita – True Mothers; Nana Mori – Last Letter; Kenshi Okada – Hope, The Legacy of Dr. Death: Black File and All About March; Daiken Okudaira – Mother; Ren Nagase – Yowamushi Pedal: Up the Road
Outstanding Score
Yuki Kajiura and Go Shiina – Demon Slayer: Kimetsu no Yaiba the Movie: Mugen Train; Taro Iwashiro – Fukushima 50; Seiji Kameda – Threads: Our Tapestry of Love; Naoki Sato – The Voice of Sin; Junnosuke Yamamoto – Tora-san, Wish You Were Here
