= Mari Natsuki =

Japanese singer, dancer and actress (born 1952)

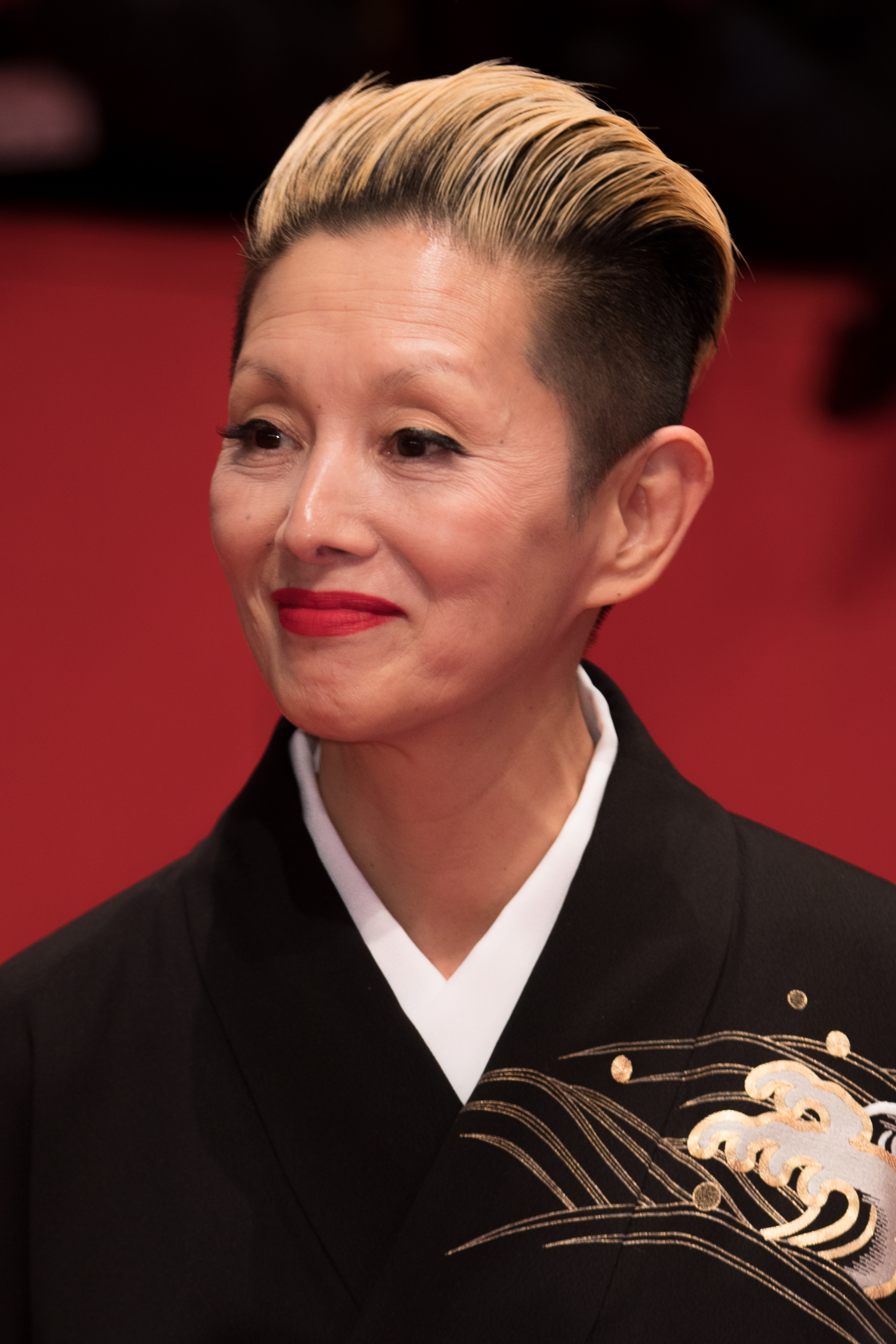
- Mari Natsuki in 2018
- Born: Junko Nakajima 中島 淳子; 2 May 1952 (age 74); Tokyo, Japan
- Other name: Junko Nakajima
- Occupations: Singer, dancer, actress
- Years active: 1971–present

Junko Saito (斉藤 淳子, Saitō Jun'ko) (née Nakajima (中島 淳子, Nakajima Jun'ko; born 2 May 1952), more commonly known by her stage name Mari Natsuki (夏木 マリ, Natsuki Mari), is a Japanese singer, dancer, actress and philanthropist, who describes herself as a "person who plays." Born in Tokyo, she started work as a singer from a young age.

In 2007, Natsuki announced her engagement to percussionist Nobu Saitō (斉藤ノヴ), with their marriage taking place in Spring 2008.

Natsuki has participated in musical theatre, including Madame Thenardier in Les Miserables, Golde in Fiddler on the Roof and that of Yukio Ninagawa. She provided the voice of Yubaba in Spirited Away, played the young witch's mother in the Japanese TV remake of Bewitched and has twice been nominated for a Japanese Academy Award. Natsuki played the character Big Mama in the Japanese version of Metal Gear Solid 4: Guns of the Patriots and has also acted in television dramas, such as the 2005 series Nobuta o Produce, playing the Vice Principal, Katharine.

In 2024, Natsuki reprised her famous roles of Yubaba/Zeniba for the stage production of Spirited Away, performing in Japan and London. In 2026, she performed the role in Seoul, Korea.

== Filmography ==
=== Film ===
- Otoko wa Tsurai yo series:
  - Tora-san, My Uncle (1989)
  - Tora-san Takes a Vacation (1990)
  - Tora-san Confesses (1991)
  - Tora-San Makes Excuses (1992)
  - Tora-san to the Rescue (1995)
  - Tora-san, Wish You Were Here (2019)
- Onimasa (1982)
- Legend of the Eight Samurai (1983)
- Fireflies in the North (1984)
- Jittemai (1986)
- Death Powder (1986)
- Strawberry Road (1991)
- The Hunted (1995)
- Samurai Fiction (1998)
- Spirited Away (2001), Yubaba (voice)
- Shōjo (2001)
- Ping Pong (2002)
- Okusama wa Majo (2004)
- Sugar and Spice (2006)
- Sakuran (2007)
- Girl in the Sunny Place (2013)
- Isle of Dogs (2018), Auntie (voice)
- Ikiru Machi (2018)
- Vision (2018)
- Over the Sky (2020), Mori Obaa-chan (voice)
- Angry Rice Wives (2021), Taki
- Yudo: The Way of the Bath (2023)
- From the End of the World (2023)
- See Hear Love (2023), Tae Izumimoto
- Until We Meet Again (2026), Hanako Shimizu

=== Television ===
- G-Men '75 (1979–80)
- Yoshitsune (2005) – Tango no Tsubone
- Carnation (2011) – old Itoko Ohara
- Montage (2016)
- Meet Me After School (2018)
- Followers (2020) - Eriko Tajima
- Welcome Home, Monet (2021)
- I Will Be Your Bloom (2022) – Yuki Hanamaki

=== Video games ===
- Metal Gear Solid 4: Guns of the Patriots (Big Mama) (2008)
- Uncharted 3: Drake's Deception (Katherine Marlowe) (2011)

=== Japanese dub ===
==== Live-action ====
- The Devil Wears Prada (2010 NTV edition) (Miranda Priestly (Meryl Streep))
- Feud (Joan Crawford (Jessica Lange))
- The West Wing (seasons 1–4) (C.J. Cregg (Allison Janney))

==== Animation ====
- Ballerina (Régine Le Haut)
- Moana (Tala)
- Moana 2 (Tala)

Theatre

- Spirited Away (Yubaba/Zeniba) - Tokyo Imperial Theatre/London Coliseum - 2024. Double starring with Romi Park.
