= 29th Yokohama Film Festival =

2008 film festival in Yokohama, Japan

- Location: Kannai Hall, Yokohama, Kanagawa, Japan
- Founded: 1980
- Festival date: 3 February 2008

The 29th Yokohama Film Festival (第29回ヨコハマ映画祭) was held on 3 February 2008 in Kannai Hall, Yokohama, Kanagawa, Japan.

== Awards ==
- Best Film: I Just Didn't Do It
- Best Actor: Ryō Kase – I Just Didn't Do It
- Best Actress: Eriko Sato – Funuke Show Some Love, You Losers!
- Best Supporting Actor: Masatoshi Nagase – Funuke Show Some Love, You Losers!
- Best Supporting Actress: Hiromi Nagasaku – Funuke Show Some Love, You Losers!
- Best Director: Masayuki Suo – I Just Didn't Do It
- Best New Director: Daihachi Yoshida – Funuke Show Some Love, You Losers!
- Best Screenplay: Satoko Okudera – Talk Talk Talk, Kaidan
- Best Cinematography: Masakazu Ato – Funuke Show Some Love, You Losers!
- Best New Talent
  - Kii Kitano – Happy Dining Table
  - Yui Aragaki – Tokyo Serendipity, Waruboro, Koizora
  - Kaho – A Gentle Breeze in the Village
- Special Prize: Shiho Fujimura (Career)

== Best 10 ==
1. I Just Didn't Do It
2. A Gentle Breeze in the Village
3. Talk Talk Talk
4. Funuke Show Some Love, You Losers!
5. Summer Days with Coo
6. Tama Moe
7. Dog in a Sidecar
8. The Brutal Hopelessness of Love
9. Happily Ever After
10. Yunagi City, Sakura Country

runner-up: Sukiyaki Western Django
runner-up: Welcome to the Quiet Room
