= Tzadik Penimi =

Israeli filmmaker

Producer, writer, filmmaker Tzadik Penimi
- צדיק פנימי
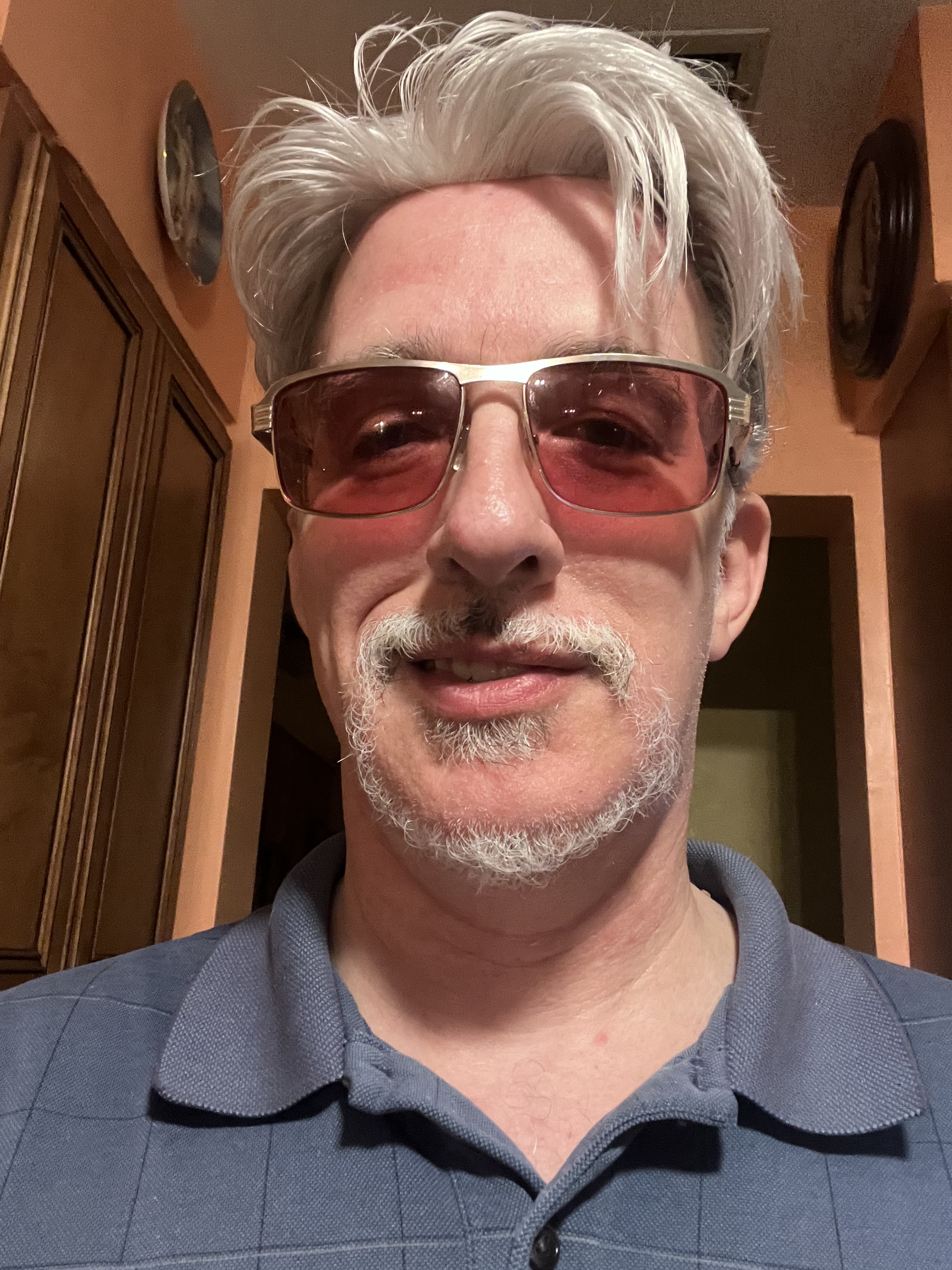
- Born: Tzamarot Ayalon, Israel
- Education: Ma'Aleh School of Film, Television and the Arts
- Occupation: Filmmaker
- Years active: 2003-present
- Known for: Film producer
- Notable work: Carved-The Slit Mouthed Woman, The A.R.K. Report, Transit, Jimm's Plan, Terra Formars
- Title: Filmmaker
- Website: www.production27studios.com

Tzadik Penimi grew up in Tzamarot Ayalon, Israel and is an Israeli producer, writer, and filmmaker.

== Early life ==
Penimi spent his childhood at his paternal grandparents in Kibbutz Yad HaShmona as well as in the U.S. He attended the Ma'Aleh School of Film, Television and the Arts.

== Career ==
After working with United King Films, Penimi participated in small independent features funded by the Israeli Film Fund. He founded Production 27 Studios in his homeland in 2003. Involvement in his first feature Cutie Honey came in 2004. Reteaming with star Eriko Sato the next year, he executive produced Carved: The Slit-Mouthed Woman, based on the Japanese urban legend.Subsequent to this was Stolen Identity a film following the events of the theft of a woman’s phone and social media accounts being hacked by a stalker.

Terra Formars was based on the original manga series and distributed by Warner Brothers. Following this was Transit (2018), filmed in Germany and France and based on the 1944 Anna Seghers novel. It won the 68th Berlin International Film Festival. Penimi then contributed to the horror film Sadako, part of The Ring franchise. Later, he produced the science fiction film Mousa.

He continues to work in the entertainment industry following three decades of productions spanning various film genres.

== Upcoming projects ==
As of 2024, Penimi's production house was working on developing a film inspired by the Steve Miller Band song "Take the Money and Run". As of 2026 this film is in active preproduction.

== Filmography ==
	Title	Role
2004	Cutie Honey	executive producer
2007	Carved:The Slit-Mouthed Woman	executive producer
2008	Tokyo Gore Police	associate producer
2010	No Retreat, No Surrender	executive producer
2010	Umizaru 3-The Last Message	producer
2010	Bayside Shakedown 3	producer
2012	Bayside Shakedown-the Final	producer
2012	Bravehearts: Umizaru	producer
2013	The A.R.K. Report	art director
2013	009-1:End of the Beginning	producer
2014	Jimm's Plan	executive producer
2016	Terra Formars	executive producer
2016	Cutie Honey:Tears	producer
2018	Transit	co-executive producer
2018	Stolen Identity	executive producer
2019	Sadako	executive producer
2019	The Secret Men Club	producer
2020	The Washing Machine	associate producer
2021	Mousa	executive producer
2027	Take the Money and Run	producer
