= Ayumi Oka =

Ayumi Oka may refer to:

- Ayumi Oka (actress) (born 1983), Japanese actress
- Ayumi Oka (tennis) (born 1986), Japanese female tennis player
