= The Third Murder =

- Theatrical release poster
- Kanji: 三度目の殺人
- Revised Hepburn: Sandome no Satsujin
- Directed by: Hirokazu Kore-eda
- Written by: Hirokazu Kore-eda
- Produced by: Matsuzaki Kaoru; Taguchi Hijiri
- Starring: Masaharu Fukuyama; Suzu Hirose; Shinnosuke Mitsushima; Mikako Ichikawa; Izumi Matsuoka; Yuki Saito; Kōtarō Yoshida; Isao Hashizume; Kōji Yakusho
- Cinematography: Mikiya Takimoto
- Edited by: Hirokazu Kore-eda
- Music by: Ludovico Einaudi
- Production companies: Fuji Television Network; Amuse; GAGA Corporation
- Distributed by: Toho; GAGA Corporation
- Release dates: 4 September 2017 (Venice); 9 September 2017 (Japan)
- Running time: 124 minutes
- Country: Japan
- Language: Japanese
- Box office: $12.38 million

The Third Murder (Japanese: 三度目の殺人, Hepburn: Sandome no Satsujin) is a 2017 Japanese legal thriller film written, directed and edited by Hirokazu Kore-eda. It was screened in the main competition section of the 74th Venice International Film Festival.

== Plot ==
=== Prologue ===
At approximately 12:30 am on October 11, 2017, while walking by the Tama River, a man bludgeons another to death and sets him on fire.

=== Main Plot ===
At Yokohama Detention Center, Shigemori, a criminal defense attorney, and Kawashima, his assistant, meet Misumi, the suspect, who is charged with robbery^{α} and murder. 30 years ago, Misumi was first charged with robbery and murder but the judge – Shigemori’s father – ruled against him receiving the death penalty; Misumi has recently been released. According to the previous attorney, Settsue, who has recently handed the case to Shigemori, Misumi frequently changes his story.

Misumi states that the man he killed is the owner of the food factory in Kawasaki he has recently been fired from and that he committed the murder to pay off some debts. He also claims to have committed the act while under the influence, but Settsue counters that last time, he claimed that he had been contemplating the act for some time. Misumi states that after murdering him, he ran back to the factory to get gasoline and while burning him, burned his own hand.

Shigemori and Kawashima decide that the best legal strategy is to reduce the charges. One day, while walking past the crime scene, they notice a cross on the ground from the burning and a teenage girl who walks with a limp, and suspect she is somehow connected to the case. After looking at surveillance video footage and examining the wallet, they determine that Misumi took the wallet after committing the murder, so the charges should be theft and murder, and they dispute his intent to steal. Shigemori visits the victim’s family with a letter written by Misumi addressed to them; he is met by his teenage daughter – the girl with a limp – and his wife, who refuses to forgive Misumi. Meanwhile, Kawashima interviews workers at the factory and learns that Misumi was having arguments with the factory owner over his wages; Shigemori decides that while he does not have the facts, they could best defend Misumi by arguing that the motive is grudge for being fired.

The trio visit Misumi again, this time showing him a magazine he may have come across that includes an article about a wife that paid a man to murder her husband for insurance. Connecting it with 500,000 yen transferred into Misumi’s bank account shortly before the murder occurred, the attorneys reason that Misumi was hired by the owner's wife to murder her husband. Misumi agrees. He then states the owner’s wife contacted him two weeks before the murder and after the murder, told him that if he kept her out of it, she would take care of him. The attorneys see this as an opportunity to weaken the case against Misumi by implicating the wife in conspiracy and aiding and abetting.

After school, Shigemori tails Sakie, the victim’s daughter. His father tells him that Misumi murdered for money and to not waste time figuring him out, but Shigemori believes that the motive is different and journeys to Rumoi, Misumi’s hometown. On the way, he reads the postcard Misumi addressed to his father, in which he recalls playing in the snow with his daughter, Megumi; Shigemori imagines himself there with them.

In Rumoi, Shigemori and Kawashima visit the man who arrested Misumi for his first robbery and murder; he claims that while the official motive was grudge, he speculates that his lawyer forced him to claim that to avoid the death penalty. They go to a bar and ask a man whether Misumi has sent his estranged daughter, Megumi, any money or tried to contact her, but he claims to not know and states that she wants him dead and will not testify for him.

Returning to Yokohama, Shigemori catches up with Sakie and tells her that Misumi may have taken a liking to her because Megumi also had a limp. He visits the victim’s wife and implies that she may have been in a sexual relationship with Misumi, infuriating her. Sakie asks why she does not admit that the payment was for mislabeling food and not murder; she replies that their business would therefore collapse. Before the first trial, Shigemori asks Misumi to deny any intention of stealing the wallet. Misumi agrees but turns around and asks him if he really believes in the story about theft and life insurance, or simply considers it a better legal strategy.

During the trial, the victim’s wife testifies that the 500,000 yen were business-related, throwing a wrench into the defense’s plans. While the court is adjourned, Shigemori meets with Sakie, who claims that the victim – her own father – had been sexually assaulting her for years and she had insinuated to Misumi that she wanted him dead. In a dream sequence, Shigemori sees both the girl and Misumi at the crime scene at the time of the murder.

Shigemori confronts Misumi about Sakie’s statement and eventually, Misumi changes his statement, claiming that the money was indeed for dirty business operations and he did not commit the murder, Settsue viewed it as a lie and convinced him to plead guilty to it to avoid the death penalty. He also asserts that he sent the money from the wallet to Megumi and burned his hand the night before while making a bonfire. Reluctantly, Shigemori agrees with him and decides to go along with his new statements.

Immediately before the trial resumes, Shigemori attempts to convince Sakie to not testify that Misumi murdered her father to save her in order to give Misumi a chance of winning. During the trial, Sakie states that she does not believe Misumi killed her father for money and does not wish the death penalty on him. Misumi claims that he was coerced by the prosecution and his attorney into claiming that he committed the murder even though he never did. The court is forced to adjourn but soon resumes with the prosecution now having to also demonstrate Misumi’s culpability. Ultimately, the judge rules in favor of the prosecution and sentences Misumi to death. After the trial, Shigemori meets Sakie, who says that she agrees with Misumi – that nobody there tells the truth and who decides who should judge others?

=== Epilogue ===
Shigemori visits Misumi again and wonders out loud about why he denied committing the crime – perhaps to protect Sakie from having to reveal herself as a victim of sexual assault. Misumi neither agrees nor disagrees, instead asking Shigemori whether that interpretation was what led him to agree to his change of plea, which he claims was part of it. Misumi states that he does not believe that he should have been born because his very existence hurts those around him, but if what Shigemori said was true, that means that even he can help someone, but perhaps Shigemori only wants to believe that is true. Shigemori leaves and, standing at an intersection, looks up at the sky.

== Cast ==
- Masaharu Fukuyama as Tomoaki Shigemori
- Kōji Yakusho as Misumi Takashi
- Suzu Hirose as Sakie Yamanaka
- Yuki Saito as Sakie's mother
- Kōtarō Yoshida as Daisuke Settsu
- Shinnosuke Mitsushima as Kawashima
- Izumi Matsuoka as Akiko Hattori
- Mikako Ichikawa as Shinohara
- Isao Hashizume as Akihisa Shigemori
- Aju Makita as the daughter of Tomoaki
- Hajime Inoue as Ono

== Production ==
Hirokazu Kore-eda was inspired to write a courtroom thriller after conversing with his friend, a lawyer, about the latter's experiences in court. Kore-eda learned that there's a gap between the Japanese people's perception of the court as a space where people aim for the truth, and what it actually is: a space for lawyers "to make adjustments to the conflict [of] interest." Kore-eda based the background of his script on the speculation of "what would happen if a lawyer really started wanting to know the truth?"

During the development process, writing the script was the hardest part for Kore-eda to tackle, due to his unfamiliarity with how lawyers worked in the justice system. He brought together seven lawyers over several months to stage mock trials and mock interviews of a criminal, while he took notes on their language and thought processes.

Besides the subject matter, another departure for Kore-eda was the film's use of the Cinemascope format, which he had not employed in his previous films.

== Reception ==
=== Critical reception ===
On review aggregator website Rotten Tomatoes, The Third Murder holds an approval rating of 87% based on 83 reviews, with an average rating of 7.05/10. The website's critical consensus reads, "The Third Murder makes satisfying work of its weighty themes, even if it doesn't quite stand with writer-director Hirokazu Koreeda's best efforts." On Metacritic, the film has an average score of 66 out of 100, based on 12 critics, indicating "generally favorable reviews".

Deborah Young of The Hollywood Reporter gave a positive review of the film, stating that "though different in feeling from the Japanese writer-director's perceptive family tales like After the Storm, it has the same clarity of thought and precision of image as his very best work." Ben Sachs of the Chicago Reader gave the film four out of four stars, stating that upon a second viewing, "Kore-eda’s surprises seemed less like a screenwriter’s tricks than Dostoevskian revelations deepening everything that came before."

=== Accolades ===
Award	Category	Nominee	Result
42nd Hochi Film Award	Best Supporting Actor	Kōji Yakusho	Won
30th Nikkan Sports Film Award	Best Film	The Third Murder	Nominated
30th Nikkan Sports Film Award	Best Actor	Masaharu Fukuyama	Nominated
30th Nikkan Sports Film Award	Best Supporting Actor	Kōji Yakusho	Won
30th Nikkan Sports Film Award	Best Supporting Actress	Suzu Hirose	Nominated
72nd Mainichi Film Awards	Best Screenplay	Hirokazu Koreeda	Nominated
72nd Mainichi Film Awards	Best Supporting Actor	Kōji Yakusho	Won
72nd Mainichi Film Awards	Best Supporting Actress	Suzu Hirose	Nominated
72nd Mainichi Film Awards	Best Cinematography	Mikiya Takimoto	Nominated
72nd Mainichi Film Awards	Best Art Direction	Yōhei Taneda	Nominated
72nd Mainichi Film Awards	Best Music	Ludovico Einaudi	Nominated
60th Blue Ribbon Awards	Best Film	The Third Murder	Nominated
60th Blue Ribbon Awards	Best Director	Hirokazu Koreeda	Nominated
60th Blue Ribbon Awards	Best Supporting Actor	Kōji Yakusho	Nominated
60th Blue Ribbon Awards	Best Supporting Actress	Yuki Saito	Won
60th Blue Ribbon Awards	Best Supporting Actress	Suzu Hirose	Nominated
12th Asian Film Awards	Best Film	The Third Murder	Nominated
12th Asian Film Awards	Best Supporting Actress	Suzu Hirose	Nominated
41st Japan Academy Prize	Picture of the Year	The Third Murder	Won
41st Japan Academy Prize	Director of the Year	Hirokazu Koreeda	Won
41st Japan Academy Prize	Screenplay of the Year	Hirokazu Koreeda	Won
41st Japan Academy Prize	Best Film Editing	Hirokazu Koreeda	Won
41st Japan Academy Prize	Best Supporting Actor	Kōji Yakusho	Won
41st Japan Academy Prize	Best Supporting Actress	Suzu Hirose	Won
41st Japan Academy Prize	Best Music	Ludovico Einaudi	Nominated
41st Japan Academy Prize	Best Cinematography	Mikiya Takimoto	Nominated
41st Japan Academy Prize	Best Lighting Direction	Norikiyo Fujii	Nominated
41st Japan Academy Prize	Best Sound Recording	Kazuhiko Tomita	Nominated

== Notes ==
^α The implication is that Misumi's intent was to rob the owner, which led him to kill him, burn him, and take his wallet from him (police found the money in the wallet missing); the prologue does not clearly indicate Misumi's intent or that he committed robbery, as the wallet itself cannot be clearly seen.
