= Chiharu Kawai =

Japanese actress and voice actress

- Born: April 22, 1973 (age 53); Hakodate, Hokkaido, Japan
- Occupation: Actress

Chiharu Kawai (川合千春, Kawai Chiharu) is a Japanese actress and voice actress. She is well known for her role as Mayumi Sasaki in Carved (2007).

== Filmography ==
=== Movies ===
- Somewhere on Earth (2001)
- Returner (2002)
- Love My Life (2006)
- The Midnight Girls (2006)
- LoveDeath (2007)
- Carved (2007)
- Hey Japanese! Do You Believe Peace, Love and Understanding (2008)
- Mutant Girls Squad (2010)
- The Killer (2010) – short film

== TV drama ==
- Three Cornered Heart (1995)
- Shin Megami Tensei: Devil Summoner (1997)
- Furuhata Ninzaburō
