= Over the Sky =

2020 Japanese animated film by Yoshinobu Sena

- Theatrical release poster
- Kanji: 君は彼方
- Revised Hepburn: Kimi wa Kanata
- Directed by: Yoshinobu Sena
- Screenplay by: Yoshinobu Sena
- Story by: Yoshinobu Sena
- Produced by: Yoshinobu Sena; Jin-man Kim; Kagenobu Kuwahata; Gen Terada; Masaaki Watanabe; Masataka Suzuki
- Starring: Honoka Matsumoto; Toshiki Seto; Anna Tsuchiya; Saori Hayami; Koichi Yamadera; Ikue Ōtani; Takehiro Kimoto; Yoshinobu Sena; Yui Ogura; Nobuko Sendō; Naoto Takenaka; Mari Natsuki
- Cinematography: Yutaka Nagaushi
- Edited by: Masahiro Gotō
- Music by: Tatsuhiko Saiki
- Production company: Digital Network Animation
- Distributed by: Rabbit House; Elephant House
- Release dates: November 11, 2020 (Ikebukuro); November 27, 2020 (Japan)
- Running time: 95 minutes
- Country: Japan
- Language: Japanese
- Budget: ¥200 million

Over the Sky (Japanese: 君は彼方, Hepburn: Kimi wa Kanata) is a 2020 Japanese animated teen fantasy film written, co-produced, and directed by Yoshinobu Sena. Animated by Digital Network Animation, and distributed by Rabbit House and Elephant House, the film stars Honoka Matsumoto, Toshiki Seto, Anna Tsuchiya, Saori Hayami, Koichi Yamadera, Ikue Ōtani, Takehiro Kimoto, Sena, Yui Ogura, Nobuko Sendō, Naoto Takenaka, and Mari Natsuki. Set in Ikebukuro, the film follows Mio Miyamasu (Matsumoto), a high school girl who tries to reconcile with her childhood friend Arata Kirishimo (Seto), following their argument when she gets involved in a traffic accident that transports her to a new world.

Toho announced an original anime film to be helmed by Sena in his film directorial debut in March 2020, with Matsumoto debuting in a leading role for an animated film and Seto in his first voice acting role in the film. Additional cast of the film were announced in August and October 2020.

Over the Sky premiered in Ikebukuro on November 11, 2020, and was released in Japan on November 27. The film bombed at the box office on its opening day.

== Plot ==
At school, Mio Miyamasu and her classmate and childhood friend Arata Kishimo discuss the boundary between sky and space, with Arata suggesting it is called "over the sky". After her markup exam, Mio is approached by her best friend Madoka and learns that she also likes Arata, causing uneasiness since she has trouble admitting her feelings. Arata begins to see several white orbs while visiting a fortune-telling shop with Mio. The two argue afterward, with Mio leaving Arata behind after questioning their relationship. That night, a heartbroken Mio decides to tell her true feelings for Arata, but she gets involved in a traffic accident.

The next day, Mio tries to approach Arata but seems unnoticed by him. As they ride home, Mio is transported to a different world called "World Border" and meets her favorite character Gimon. As Gimon guides Mio to a new world where she will forget everything, they are stopped by a kimono-wearing girl who introduces herself as Kiku-chan. She explains that Mio accidentally arrived in World Border due to an out-of-body experience, and needs to be returned to the human realm using a train ticket and the "desire" to return. Mio contacts Arata, who mysteriously answers it while in a hospital to visit Mio's unconscious body. Mio, Gimon, and Kiku-chan arrive at Forgotten Things Counter, but Mio has trouble telling the lost-and-found officer her memories with Arata so they visit the goddess, Mrs. Mori, for help. Following the mysterious call from Mio, Arata returns to the fortune-teller for help, but his soul suddenly leaves his body to arrive at the World Border.

Despite successfully obtaining a ticket from the lost-and-found officer, the World Border's guardian Mogari prevents Mio from returning to the human realm. With the help of Gimon, Kiku-chan, and Arata, Mio arrives back to the human realm but is unable to reunite with her body. Arata brings Mio's unconscious body to the cliff where he has a great memory with her and hopes for her soul to return. Mio, accepting her fate, firmly resolves to return to the human realm, finally remembering her "desire" to tell Arata her love for him. She successfully returns to the human realm and reunites with Arata.

== Voice cast ==
- Honoka Matsumoto as Mio Miyamasu (宮益 澪):
  A seventeen-year-old second-year high school student and the childhood friend of Arata Kishimo, whom she likes but cannot convey her feelings. Director Yoshinobu Sena chose Matsumoto to voice the character after he fell in "love at first sight" with her voice when he saw her on TV. This marks Matsumoto playing a leading role in an anime film for the first time after having a supporting role in Ride Your Wave (2019).
- Toshiki Seto as Arata Kishimo (鬼司如 新):
  A seventeen-year-old second-year high school student and Mio's childhood friend. After his father's death, Arata lives apart from his mother. It is later revealed that he has an astral projection power due to the Kishimo blood. Sena invited Seto for a dinner and saw his "pure and passionate" image that was fitting for the character within five minutes of their meeting. This marks Seto taking a voice acting role for the first time.
- Anna Tsuchiya as Orika (織夏): A fortune-teller who operates a "fortune-telling hall" in a small building in Ikebukuro and Arata's aunt.
- Saori Hayami as Kiku-chan (菊ちゃん):
  A mysterious girl whom Mio encounters in a new world after getting involved in a traffic accident. She is later revealed to be the personification of Mio's pet fish named "Kii" from the human realm.
- Koichi Yamadera and Ikue Ōtani as Gimon (ギーモン, Gīmon):
  A popular creepy alien character whom Mio loves as an enthusiastic fan. When Mio is transported to a new world, Gimon serves as her guide.
- Takehiro Kimoto as a lost-and-found officer (忘れ物口の係員, Wasuremono Kuchi no Kakariin): A 120-centimeter-tall man who dresses as a station attendant and disappears when people he asks if they left something behind are wrong.
- Yoshinobu Sena as several voices:
  The high school teacher who recites the poem Spring Morning by Tang dynasty poet Meng Haoran during the classroom scene, the "creepy" voice heard in reverse when Mio is being transported to the new world, and the characters of the film that Mio and Arata are watching in a cinema during their date.
- Yui Ogura as Madoka (円佳):
  A seventeen-year-old second-year high school student, and Mio and Arata's best friend. Madoka envies Mio for being close to Arata since she also likes him.
- Nobuko Sendō as Sachi Miyamasu (宮益 沙智): The 43-year-old mother of Mio.
- Naoto Takenaka as Mogari (殯): The guardian of the new world who dresses like a shinigami.
- Mari Natsuki as Mrs. Mori (森おばあちゃん, Mori Obā-chan):
  The owner of a candy store that Mio has visited in her childhood and the goddess of the new world where she is transported to. Her true form is based on the Japanese goddess of the sun Amaterasu.

== Production ==
In March 2020, Toho announced the production of an original "adolescent fantasy" anime film titled Kimi wa Kanata (lit. 'You Are Beyond'), with Yoshinobu Sena directing it at Digital Network Animation. This is Sena's directorial debut with a theatrical film after directing Vampire Holmes (2015) and The Onda Family, Including the Cat, Too (2016). The film was originally intended to be a short film, but it was later changed into a feature-length film, with Sena correcting the script about twenty times. He borrowed around ¥200 million for the production of the film.

In March 2020, Honoka Matsumoto and Toshiki Seto were set to respectively star as Mio Miyamasu and Arata Kishimo. Sena suggested Matsumoto and Seto do an improvisational theater before recording their lines since they would be working for the first time. To create an atmosphere where their characters "might become lovers" in the film, Matsumoto and Seto performed in a setting where they were dating at a museum, with Sena playing as a "strange uncle". Additional cast of the film were announced in August 2020, including Saori Hayami as Kiku-chan, Yui Ogura as Madoka, and Koichi Yamadera and Ikue Ōtani as Gimon. Mari Natsuki, Naoto Takenaka, Anna Tsuchiya, Nobuko Sendō, and Takehiro Kimoto also joined the cast to respectively voice Mrs. Mori, Mogari, Orika, Sachi Miyamasu, and a lost-and-found officer in October 2020.

== Music ==
Japanese rock band Saji was announced to be performing the theme music for Over the Sky in September 2020, making it the first time the band would be performing for an anime film. The band's vocalist, Takumi Yoshida, composed the song later titled "Dramatic Moment" (瞬間ドラマチック, Shunkan Doramachikku). Composer Tatsuhiko Saiki made his debut in an anime film by composing the film's original soundtrack, which was released in Japan on November 25, 2020. It includes the insert song sang by Mio in the film titled "To You" (君に。, Kimi ni), with Sena writing the lyrics.

== Marketing ==
A 30-second teaser trailer and teaser poster visual for Over the Sky were released in July 2020. A new 60-second trailer and the final poster visual for the film were released in October 2020. The film's novelization written by Sena and illustrated by Tomoyuki Abe was released by Kadokawa under their Fujimi Fantasia Bunko imprint in Japan on November 20, 2020. Promotional partners for the film included Animate Cafe, Seibu Railway, and Crossdine Cake Shop in Tokyo's Hotel Metropolitan.

== Release ==
=== Theatrical ===
Over the Sky premiered at Toho Cinemas in Ikebukuro on November 11, 2020, and was released in Japan on November 27. The film was released in the United Kingdom on October 15, 2021. As part of the Kotatsu Japanese Animation Festival in Wales, the film was released on October 2 and 30, 2022, and on November 4.

=== Home media ===
Over the Sky was released digitally in Japan on April 23, 2021. Crunchyroll began streaming the film in the United States, Canada, Australia, New Zealand, South Africa, Netherlands, Denmark, Finland, Norway, Sweden, and Iceland on October 21, 2021, while HBO Max released it with Portuguese and Spanish dubbing in the Latin America region on April 4, 2022. Anime Limited released the collector's edition of the film's Blu-ray and DVD combo pack in the United Kingdom on May 8, 2023, and the Blu-ray standard edition on August 7.

== Reception ==
Over the Sky became a box-office bomb with 1,300 admissions on its opening day. Allen Moody of THEM Anime Reviews gave the film 3 out of 5 stars, feeling that it was a "smorgasbord of repurposed stuff from other shows" like Fireworks (2017), Mirai (2018), Weathering with You (2019), and the Frozen franchise. Moody criticized Mio's actions in the film and how she resolves her conflict through singing without making an effort.
