= Magerarenai Onna =

Japanese television drama

Magerarenai Onna (曲げられない女, The unbending woman) is a Japanese television drama that aired on NTV between 13 January and 17 March 2010.

== Synopsis ==
Ogiwara Saki (Miho Kanno) is a woman who does not go with the flow of society but forges her own path. She hates flattering men and trying to be nice to people of the same sex. She has failed the bar exam nine times in a row but persists in her dream of being a lawyer while working as a clerk at a law firm. Saki's good friend, Hasumi Riko (Hiromi Nagasaku), who is a mother of two children, was high school classmates with Saki, but is in fact 35, because she had deliberately declared herself to be two years younger. She has no qualms of lying for the sake of female happiness, pretending to be married to a man of wealth and blessed with children. Because her personality is the exact opposite, this accentuates Saki's uncompromising way of life.

== Cast ==
- Miho Kanno as Ogiwara Saki
  - Himeka Asami as young Saki
- Hiromi Nagasaku as Hasumi Riko
- Shosuke Tanihara as Aida Kouki
- Takashi Tsukamoto as Sakamoto Masato
- Tomohiro Ichikawa as Imada Kenji
- Anna Nose as Yokoya Satomi
- Tokuma Nishioka as Chief Mashino
- Mayumi Asaka as Ogiwara Hikari
- Makiya Yamaguchi as Osabe Yoshitaka
- Yukiko Takabayashi
- Yasufumi Hayashi as Ogiwara Yoshinori
- Ayumi Oka
- Sei Hiraizumi as Nakashima Tsuyoshi

== Episodes ==
Episode	Air date	Title	Rating
1	13 January 2010	男? 仕事? 夢? 貫く私の究極の選択! 絶対幸せになる	15.4%
2	20 January 2010	女の本音...お金は欲しいわよ!	11.0%
3	27 January 2010	強情娘とガンコ母の最後の対決	13.7%
4	3 February 2010	殴る女...一人ぼっち同士の友情	13.3%
5	10 February 2010	殴り返す女! 夫と子供は大切に	13.1%
6	17 February 2010	リスクだらけの女の幸せさがし	14.5%
7	24 February 2010	友情決裂! 孤独な決断、なぜ?	13.6%
8	3 March 2010	女がひとりで生きられない理由	15.9%
9	10 March 2010	出産直前...最後のプロポーズ!	16.4%
10	17 March 2010	女の革命遂に完結! 10年日記に刻まれた最後の言葉	18.6%
Ratings for Kanto region (average rating 14.6%)
