= Tora-san Takes a Vacation =

- Theatrical poster
- Directed by: Yoji Yamada
- Written by: Yoji Yamada; Yoshitaka Asama
- Produced by: Kiyoshi Shimizu
- Starring: Kiyoshi Atsumi; Kumiko Goto
- Cinematography: Tetsuo Takaba
- Edited by: Iwao Ishii
- Music by: Naozumi Yamamoto
- Distributed by: Shochiku
- Release date: December 22, 1990
- Running time: 106 minutes
- Country: Japan
- Language: Japanese

Tora-san Takes a Vacation (男はつらいよ 寅次郎の休日, Otoko wa Tsurai yo: Torajirō no Kyūjitsu) is a 1990 Japanese comedy film directed by Yoji Yamada. It stars Kiyoshi Atsumi as Torajirō Kuruma (Tora-san), and Kumiko Goto as his nephew's love interest for "Madonna". Tora-san Takes a Vacation is the forty-third entry in the popular, long-running Otoko wa Tsurai yo series.

== Cast ==
- Kiyoshi Atsumi as Torajirō
- Chieko Baisho as Sakura
- Kumiko Goto as Izumi Oikawa
- Hidetaka Yoshioka as Mitsuo Suwa
- Mari Natsuki as Ayako Oikawa
- Shimojo Masami as Kuruma Tatsuzō
- Chieko Misaki as Tsune Kuruma (Torajiro's aunt)
- Gin Maeda as Hiroshi Suwa
- Hisao Dazai as Boss (Umetarō Katsura)
- Gajirō Satō as Genkō
- Chishū Ryū as Gozen-sama

== Critical appraisal ==
Hidetaka Yoshioka was nominated for Best Supporting Actor and Kumiko Goto for Best Supporting Actress at the Japan Academy Prize for their roles in Tora-san Takes a Vacation, and the previous entry in the series, Tora-san, My Uncle (1989). The German-language site molodezhnaja gives Tora-san Takes a Vacation two and a half out of five stars.

== Availability ==
Tora-san Takes a Vacation was released theatrically on December 22, 1990. In Japan, the film was released on videotape in 1996, and in DVD format in 2005 and 2008.

== Bibliography ==
=== English ===
- "OTOKO WA TSURAIYO -TORAJIRO NO KYUJITSU". Complete Index to World Film.
- Otoko wa tsurai yo: Torajiro no kyuujitsu (1990) at IMDb

=== German ===
- "Tora-San Takes a Vacation" (in German). www.molodezhnaja.ch.

=== Japanese ===
- 男はつらいよ 寅次郎の休日 (1990) (in Japanese). allcinema.net.
- "男はつらいよ 寅次郎の休日". Japanese Cinema Database (Agency for Cultural Affairs). Archived from the original on 2012-03-11.
- 男はつらいよ 寅次郎の休日 (in Japanese). Japanese Movie Database.
- 男はつらいよ 寅次郎の休日 (in Japanese). Kinema Junpo. Archived from the original on 2012-03-24.
