= Strayer's Chronicle =

- Poster
- ストレイヤーズ・クロニクル
- Directed by: Takahisa Zeze
- Screenplay by: Kōhei Kiyasu; Takahisa Zeze
- Based on: Strayer's Chronicle by Takayoshi Honda
- Starring: Masaki Okada; Shōta Sometani; Riko Narumi
- Cinematography: Ryūto Kondō
- Edited by: Ryō Hayano
- Music by: Gorō Yasukawa
- Production company: Twins Japan
- Distributed by: Warner Bros. Pictures
- Release date: June 27, 2015 (Japan)
- Running time: 126 minutes
- Country: Japan
- Language: Japanese
- Box office: ¥64.5 million (Japan)

Strayer's Chronicle (Japanese: ストレイヤーズ・クロニクル) is a 2015 Japanese science fiction action film based on the novel of the same name by Takayoshi Honda. It was directed by Takahisa Zeze, who is known for Heaven's Story (2010). The film was released on June 27, 2015.

== Cast ==
- Masaki Okada as Subaru
- Shōta Sometani as Manabu
- Riko Narumi as Saya
- Mayu Matsuoka as Momo
- Hiroya Shimizu as Ryosuke
- Toshiki Seto as Ryuji
- Nobuyuki Suzuki as Sou
- Shuntarou Yanagi as Hide
- Shunya Shiraishi as Wataru
- Sara Takatsuki as Shizuka
- Yuina Kuroshima as Aoi
- Tuyoshi Ihara as Watase
- Renji Ishibashi as Oosone
- Kousuke Toyohara as Isaka

== Reception ==
The film has grossed ¥64.5 million at the Japanese box office.
