= Okaeri Mone =

Japanese television drama series

- Promotional poster
- Original title: おかえりモネ
- Genre: Drama
- Written by: Naoko Adachi
- Directed by: Masae Ichiki; Toki Kajiwara; Tomohiro Uwano; Yasuko Tsuda
- Starring: Kaya Kiyohara; Kyōka Suzuki; Kentaro Sakaguchi; Ren Nagase; Aju Makita; Mio Imada; Yuri Tsunematsu; Tadanobu Asano; Hidetoshi Nishijima; Tatsuya Fuji; Mari Natsuki; Seiyō Uchino
- Narrated by: Keiko Takeshita
- Opening theme: "Nanairo" by Bump of Chicken
- Composer: Masakatsu Takagi
- Country of origin: Japan
- Original language: Japanese
- No. of episodes: 120

Production
- Executive producers: Akashi Yoshinaga; Takashi Sugisaki
- Producer: Akiko Ueda
- Running time: 15 minutes
- Production company: NHK

Original release
- Network: NHK
- Release: May 17 – October 29, 2021

Okaeri Mone (おかえりモネ, Welcome Home, Monet) is a Japanese television drama series and the 104th Asadora series, following Ochoyan. It premiered on May 17, 2021 and concluded on October 29, 2021.

== Plot ==
Born in September 1995, Momone Nagaura lived with her parents, grandfather, and sister in Kesennuma City, Miyagi Prefecture. After failing her college entrance exams, she went to live with her grandfather's acquaintance who is a forest guide in Tome City. Momone's life changed when she met a popular weather forecaster from Tokyo who taught her how weather forecasts can predict the future. She decides to study hard and be a weather forecaster.

== Cast ==
=== Nagaura's family ===
- Kaya Kiyohara as Momone Nagaura (her nickname was Monet)
- Seiyō Uchino as Kōji Nagaura, Momone's father
- Kyōka Suzuki as Ayako Nagaura, Momone's mother
- Aju Makita as Michi Nagaura, Momone's younger sister
- Tatsuya Fuji as Tatsumi Nagaura, Momone's grandfather
- Keiko Takeshita as Masayo Nagaura, Momone's grandmother (also as narrator)

=== Momone's classmate and families ===
- Ren Nagase (King & Prince) as Ryō Oikawa, Momone's classmate
- Yuri Tsunematsu as Asumi Nomura, Momone's childhood friend
- Kōki Maeda as Mitsuo Gotō, Momone's classmate
- Hyuga Takada as Yūto Hayasaka, Momone's classmate
- Tadanobu Asano as Shinji Oikawa, Ryō's father
- Maki Sakai as Minami Oikawa, Ryō's mother
- Reiko Kusamura as Fumie, Ryō's grandmother

=== Tome and Kesennuma people ===
- Mari Natsuki as Sayaka Nitta, a wealthy woman
- Kentaro Sakaguchi as Kōtarō Suganami, a young doctor in a clinic
- Kenta Hamano as Shōyō Sasaki, the chief of a forestry union
- Denden as Hiroshi Kawakubo, an old staff at forestry union
- Shinya Tsukamoto as Kazuhisa Tanaka, a master at jazz cafe
- Yusuke Hirayama as Nobuhiro Nakayama, a doctor in a clinic
- Kōichi Yamadera as Katsutoshi Endō
- Sayaka Yamaguchi as Mikako Takahashi
- Mizuki Kayashima as Ichika Mizuno
- Aoi Itō as Akari Ishii
- Norihiko Tsukuda as Shigeki Koyama
- Daikichi Sugawara as Jirō Ōta

=== Tokyo people ===
==== People at weather forecast company ====
- Hidetoshi Nishijima as Satoru Asaoka, a weather anchor
- Mio Imada as Riko Marianna Jinno, a news anchor
- Hiroya Shimizu as Mamoru Uchida, an employee
- Misato Morita a Midori Nosaka, an employee
- Jun Inoue as Kazumasa Anzai, the company's president

==== Others ====
- Reo Tamaoki as Kōhei Sawatari, a reporter in charge at Japan Meteorological Agency
- Saki Takaoka as Satoko Takamura, a meteorological desk at television station
- Maiko as Natsu Inoue, a Tokyo boardinghouse landlady
- Koharu Sugawara as Yūki Samejima, an wheelchair marathon athlete

== Production ==
NHK announced the program would premiere on May 17, 2021 after Ochoyan ended.

Preceded by Ochoyan	Asadora; May 17, 2021 – October 29, 2021	Succeeded by Come Come Everybody
