= Ribbon (band) =

Japanese pop group

Ribbon was a Japanese pop group that consisted of Hiromi Nagasaku, Arimi Matsuno and Aiko Satoh. It released its first single on 6 December 1989, and its final album before it disbanded on 18 March 1994. Its first single "Little Date" is best known as the second opening of the anime Ranma ½.

Four of Ribbon's singles reached the top 10 in the national Oricon Singles Chart, and their first album Lucky Point reached #9 on the Oricon Albums Chart.

== Discography ==
=== Albums ===
- Lucky Point (30 May 1990) – JP #9
- ワンダフルでいこう!! (Girls Be Wonderful!) (23 January 1991) – JP #15
- Jessica (17 July 1991) – JP #20
- R753 (18 March 1992) – JP #13
- Knight (17 July 1992) – JP #25
- 星の木の下で… (Hoshi no Ki no Shita de) (20 November 1992) – JP #34
- Merry-Hurry (3 November 1993)
- Rock'n' Roll Ribbon / Merry-Hurry 完全版 (ROCK'N'ROLL RIBBON / Merry-Hurry Kanzenban) (18 March 1994)

=== Compilation albums ===
- Delicious Best of ribbon (21 November 1991) – JP #32
- More Delicious - ribbon BEST II - (18 June 1993) – JP #45
- Best = ベスト (21 November 2001)
- Singles コンプリート (18 July 2007)
- My これ! Lite (10 April 2010)

=== Singles ===
Year	Title	B-side (c/w)	Date	JP
1989	"リトル☆デイト" ("Little☆Date")	"1／2のチケット" ("1/2 no Chiketto")	6 December 1989	11
1990	"そばにいるね" ("Soba ni Iru ne")	"Circus Parade"	11 April 1990	9
1990	"あのコによろしく" ("Ano ko ni Yoroshiku")	"バ・ブ・ル" ("Bubble")	25 July 1990	10
1990	"Virgin Snow"	"ここにおいで" ("Koko ni Oide")	14 November 1990	8
1991	"太陽の行方" ("Taiyo no Yukue")	"Maybe OK!"	3 March 1991	12
1991	"Silent Summer"	"淑女になりたい" ("Lady ni Naritai")	26 June 1991	12
1991	"それは言わない約束" ("Sore wa Iwanai Yakusoku")	"楽園へ行こう" ("Rakuen e Ikou") / "それは言わない約束 (Original Karaoke)"	13 November 1991	14
1992	"Deep Breath"	"優しい歌" ("Yasashii Uta") / "Deep Breath (Original Karaoke)"	21 February 1992	15
1992	"太陽に火をつけて" ("Taiyo ni Hi o Tsukete")	"Tadashii Heart no Yukue" / "太陽に火をつけて (Original Karaoke)"	3 June 1992	15
1992	""S"ENSATIONAL WIND"	"Let's Go" / ""S"ENSATIONAL WIND (Original Karaoke)"	2 September 1992	18
1992	"Do You Remember Me?"	"Heartbreak" / "Do You Remember Me? (Original Karaoke)"	2 December 1992	22
1993	"Be My Diamond!"	"卒業" ("Sotsugyou") / "Be My Diamond! (Original Karaoke)"	7 April 1993	29
1993	"夜明けなんていらない" ("Yoake Nante Iranai")	"メリハリで愛して" ("Merry Hurry de Aishite") / "夜明けなんていらない (Original Karaoke)"	6 October 1993	42
