= Going My Home =

Japanese television series

Going My Home (Japanese: ゴーイング マイ ホーム) is a 2012 Japanese television series, directed by Hirokazu Kore-eda and featuring Abe Hiroshi. The elderly father of a family collapses and lies in a coma. While waiting for him to recover, the family learns and investigates about his life, in particular his romantic affairs.

== Cast ==
- Hiroshi Abe: as Tsuboi Ryota
- Tomoko Yamaguchi: Tsuboi Sae
- YOU: as Ito Takiko
- Aoi Miyazaki: Shimojima Naho
- Hirofumi Arai: Sanada Shun
- Ken Yasuda: Ito Kenji
- Bakarhythm: Kobayashi Satoru
- Isao Natsuyagi: Tsuboi Eisuke
- Sadao Abe: Tokunaga Taro
- Kazuko Yoshiyuki: Tsuboi Toshiko
- Toshiyuki Nishida: Torii Osamu
- Aju Makita: Tsuboi Moe
- Lily as Tsuji Tokiko
- Noriko Eguchi as Tsutsumi
- Yasuhi Nakamura as Hatakenaka
- Takashi Yamanaka as Kai

== Plot ==
After his father Eisuke (Isao Natsuyagi) collapses and falls into a coma, Tsuboi Ryota (Abe Hiroshi) and his family gather in the hospital, regularly travelling to the small country town from Tokyo. Following their discovery of an unknown woman visiting him, the family begins an investigation into Eisuke's life.

Ryota is a successful advertising agency executive married to "food stylist" Sae (Yamaguchi Tomoko), who has her own cooking TV show. Their daughter has issues at school, imagining friends and causing trouble. While investigating his father's life, Ryota deals with his own issues at the agency and with his wife and daughter.

Ryota discovers that the mysterious woman Naho (Aoi Miyazaki) is the daughter of her father's best friend. The two shared the love of Naho's mother, with whom they grew up. While staying in the town, Ryota and his daughter learns about its oddness, in particular the town's belief in the local legendary creatures Kuna. Ryota finds a tiny hat apparently belonging to one of the creatures and becomes fascinated with them. He gets the agency involved in a hunt for them.

Ryota and the townspeople organise a hunt for the creatures, and Ryota seems to see one. Eisuke dies. Ryota comes to terms with his problematic relationship with his father.
