= Carved: The Slit-Mouthed Woman =

- Theatrical release poster
- Kuchisake-onna
- Directed by: Kōji Shiraishi
- Written by: Kōji Shiraishi; Naoyuki Yokota
- Produced by: Saori Yabe; Shuntarō Kanai; Hirokazu Kokago; Takafumi Ōhashi; Kayako Hanamura; Nobumasa Miyazawa; Yoshimitsu Yoshitsuru; Tzadik Penimi
- Starring: Eriko Sato; Miki Mizuno; Haruhiko Kato; Kaori Sakagami
- Cinematography: Shozo Morishita
- Edited by: Shūichi Kakesu
- Music by: Gen Wano; Chika Fujino
- Production companies: Twin Co. Ltd. Tornado Film; Memory Tech; Earl Grey Film
- Distributed by: Tornado Film; Tartan Films
- Release date: March 17, 2007 (Japan)
- Running time: 90 minutes
- Country: Japan
- Language: Japanese

Carved: The Slit-Mouthed Woman (Japanese: 口裂け女, Hepburn: Kuchisake-onna) (also known as A Slit-Mouthed Woman) is a 2007 Japanese supernatural horror film directed by Kōji Shiraishi and written by Shiraishi and Naoyuki Yokota. Based on the Japanese urban legend known as Kuchisake-onna, or "the Slit-Mouthed Woman", the film stars Eriko Sato as Kyōko Yamashita, a divorced mother and teacher who attempts to solve a series of child abduction cases with the help of her co-worker Noboru Matsuzaki, played by Haruhiko Kato.

The film was followed by a prequel, Carved 2: The Scissors Massacre, in 2008.

In 2016 a film titled Slit Mouth Woman in L.A. was released, but is unrelated to the series.

== Plot ==
As stories about Kuchisake-onna ("The Slit-Mouthed Woman") spread through a Japanese town, an earthquake causes a corpse matching the entity's description to emerge from a closet in an abandoned house. At the same time, elementary school teacher Noboru Matsuzaki hears a voice ask, "Am I pretty?" A boy searching for Kuchisake-onna with his friends is then abducted at a playground.

Following the boy's disappearance, Noboru's school sends students home in groups escorted by staff. Mika Sasaki is reluctant to leave, telling teacher Kyōko that her mother hits her. Kyōko, whose own daughter lives with her ex-husband, becomes distressed when Mika says she hates her mother, causing Mika to run away. She encounters Kuchisake-onna, whose presence had been foreshadowed by Noboru hearing her voice. As the entity takes Mika away, Mika knocks off her mask, revealing her disfigured face.

Noboru shows Kyōko a thirty-year-old photograph of a woman resembling Kuchisake-onna. After hearing the voice again, he traces it to a house, where he and Kyōko rescue a boy from the entity. Kyōko seemingly kills Kuchisake-onna with a knife, but its body transforms into that of a housewife, revealing that the spirit can possess other women, who develop a cough.

Noboru identifies the woman in the photograph as his deceased mother, Taeko Matsuzaki, a sickly and unstable woman who abused him and his siblings. After Taeko killed Noboru's siblings, she "disappeared", and rumours and sightings of Kuchisake-onna began. The spirit subsequently possesses the mother of Mika's friend, Natsuki, taking Natsuki to its lair, cutting her mouth and murdering the abducted boy. Natsuki is found at a park by her father and admitted to hospital.

Kyōko discovers a note stating that Kuchisake-onna's hideout is a deserted house with a red roof, matching Noboru's childhood home. Noboru recalls that Taeko had asked him to mercy kill her, warning that she would otherwise return to haunt others. Instead, he slit her mouth and stabbed her, dressed her body in a coat and mask, and hid it in a closet.

Kyōko and Noboru find Mika in the house's basement and are attacked by Kuchisake-onna, which captures and brutalises them. Kyōko stabs the spirit in the neck, apparently killing it and leaving Natsuki's mother's body behind. Mika's mother then becomes the new host. Noboru fights the spirit but is fatally wounded; before dying, he beheads it, believing this will finally destroy it. However, decapitation fails, as the only way to defeat Kuchisake-onna is to obliterate Taeko's corpse in the closet. The spirit subsequently possesses Kyōko while she visits her daughter, though this may occur within a dream-like sequence.

== Cast ==
- Miki Mizuno as Taeko Matsuzaki / Kuchisake-onna
- Eriko Sato as Kyōko Yamashita
- Haruhiko Kato as Noboru Matsuzaki
  - Younger version portrayed by Hiroto Ito
- Chiharu Kawai as Mayumi Sasaki
- Rie Kuwana as Mika Sasaki
- Sakina Kuwae as Natsuki Tamura
- Yûto Kawase as Masatoshi Kita
- Saaya Irie as Shiho Nakajima
- Runa Okada as Shiho's friend
- Rio Iguchi as Shiho's friend
- Kazuyuki Matsuzawa as Hideo Tamura
- Kaori Sakagami as Saori Tamura
- Ryoko Takizawa as Kazuko Yoshida
- Mei Tanaka as Yukiko Yoshida
- Aoi Shimoyama as Shingo Kuwabata
- Yūrei Yanagi as Detective Kubo
- Kōichirō Nishi as Kyōko's Ex-Husband
- Hiroto Itō as Young Noboru Matsuzaki
- Ayu Kanesaki as Ai Ôno

== Production ==
The film was directed by Kōji Shiraishi from a screenplay he co-wrote with Naoyuki Yokota and was based on the Japanese urban legend of Kuchisake-onna, which had become widely known among children in Japan during the late 1970s.

Eriko Sato said that portraying a teacher with a history of abusing her child was emotionally difficult, particularly while filming scenes involving children. Sato and Haruhiko Kaot later recalled that production followed a tight shooting schedule in cold conditions with limited rest.

Miki Mizuno portrayed the Slit-Mouthed Woman using extensive special-effects makeup. Sato and Kato recalled finding the makeup disturbing even while knowing that Mizuno was underneath it. Shiraishi said that some violent scenes were considered for removal, but he retained them because he believed depicting physical pain was necessary to address the film's themes of child abuse and domestic violence.

== Release ==
Carved: The Slit-Mouthed Woman was released theatrically in Japan on 17 March 2007. The film was distributed by Tornado Film and exhibited in 35 mm.

== Home media ==
Kadokawa released a special-edition DVD in Japan on 20 July 2007. Its supplementary material included a making-of featurette, interviews and comments from the cast and director, footage from premiere events, trailers and television spots.

The film was released on DVD by Tartan Video on Aug 14, 2007. Tartan later re-released the film as a part of a 3-disc combo pack with Sheitan, and Slaughter Night on Oct 13, 2009. It was last released on DVD by E1 Entertainment on Oct 11, 2011.

In October 2024, Arrow Video released Carved on Blu-ray as part of its four-disc J-Horror Rising box set. The release presented the film in high definition with lossless 5.1 and stereo audio and included a new audio commentary by Japanese folklore writer Zack Davisson, an interview with director Kōji Shiraishi, and a video essay by Japanese horror scholar Lindsay Nelson.

== Critical reception ==
Russell Edwards of Variety gave the film a mixed review, describing it as a "low-budget chiller that is unlikely to join the international remake stampede", though he noted that it "has an unsettling quality that transcends its cheap origins". Adam Hakari, a member of the Online Film Critics Society, gave the film 2.5 out of 4 stars, writing that it "does a passable job of touching upon some heavy issues while not forgetting to sate the appetite of gorehound fans. Still, the film so often comes close to greatness that viewers may find themselves disappointed when their expectations are -- pardon the pun -- cut short."

Andre Manseau of Arrow in the Head gave the film a score of 3 out of 4, calling it "risky, brutal and unsettling" and "a good film that is intense and scary". Adrian Halen of HorrorNews.net gave the film 3.5 out of 5 stars, commending Mizuno's performance and writing that "A top contender for becoming a classic, Carved is a story that adds a new mythos into the horror arena." Justin Felix of DVD Talk awarded the film 3 out of 5 stars, writing that "The central protagonists are not conceived well, but the titular antagonist is - and there's atmosphere enough to get the audience to the end point."

== Prequel ==
A prequel to Carved, titled Carved 2: The Scissors Massacre, was released in 2008. It is also known under the titles Carved 2, A Slit-Mouthed Woman 2, and Kuchisake-onna 2.
