= Tora-san to the Rescue =

- Theatrical poster
- Directed by: Yoji Yamada
- Written by: Yoji Yamada
- Produced by: Hiroshi Fukazawa
- Starring: Kiyoshi Atsumi; Ruriko Asaoka
- Cinematography: Mutsuo Nakanuma
- Edited by: Iwao Ishii
- Music by: Naozumi Yamamoto; Jun'nosuke Yamamoto
- Distributed by: Shochiku
- Release date: December 23, 1995
- Running time: 107 minutes
- Country: Japan
- Language: Japanese

Tora-san to the Rescue (男はつらいよ 寅次郎紅の花, Otoko wa Tsurai yo: Torajirō Kurenai no Hana) is a 1995 Japanese comedy film directed by Yoji Yamada. It stars Kiyoshi Atsumi as Torajirō Kuruma (Tora-san), and Ruriko Asaoka as his love interest or "Madonna". Tora-san to the Rescue is the forty-eighth entry in the popular, long-running Otoko wa Tsurai yo series.

== Cast ==
- Kiyoshi Atsumi as Torajirō
- Chieko Baisho as Sakura Suwa
- Ruriko Asaoka as Lily
- Hidetaka Yoshioka as Mitsuo Suwa
- Kumiko Goto as Izumi Oikawa
- Masami Shimojō as Kuruma Tatsuzō
- Chieko Misaki as Tsune Kuruma (Torajirō's aunt)
- Gin Maeda as Hiroshi Suwa
- Hisao Dazai as Boss (Umetarō Katsura)
- Gajirō Satō as Genkō
- Hiroshi Inuzuka as Taxi driver
- Keiroku Seki as Ponshū
- Mari Natsuki as Ayako Oikawa
- Kunie Tanaka as Ship captain

== Critical appraisal ==
The German-language site molodezhnaja gives Tora-san to the Rescue three and a half out of five stars.

== Availability ==
Tora-san to the Rescue was released theatrically on December 23, 1995. In Japan, the film was released on videotape in 1996 and 1997, and in DVD format in 2005 and 2008.

== Bibliography ==
=== English ===
- Tora-san to the Rescue at IMDb

=== German ===
- "Tora-San to the Rescue" (in German). www.molodezhnaja.ch.

=== Japanese ===
- 男はつらいよ 寅次郎紅の花 (1995) (in Japanese). allcinema.net.
- "男はつらいよ 寅次郎紅の花". Japanese Cinema Database (Agency for Cultural Affairs). Archived from the original on 2012-03-26.
- 男はつらいよ 寅次郎紅の花 (in Japanese). Japanese Movie Database.
- 男はつらいよ 寅次郎紅の花 (in Japanese). Kinema Junpo. Archived from the original on 2015-07-07.
