= New Nobunaga Chronicles =

Japanese manga series

- New Nobunaga Chronicles: High School is a Battlefield
- First tankōbon volume cover

新・信長公記 〜ノブナガくんと私〜
- Genre: Science fiction; Yankī
- Manga
- Written by: Shinobu Kaitani
- Published by: Kodansha
- Magazine: Weekly Young Magazine (2019–2020); Comic Days (2020–2021)
- Original run: March 25, 2019 – September 6, 2021
- Volumes: 8
- Television drama
- Directed by: Satoru Nakajima; Keisuke Toyoshima
- Produced by: Kenji Numata (chief); Takashi Nakayama; Shoko Kojima; Yūki Seike
- Written by: Tomoki Kanazawa; Date-san
- Music by: Yuki Hayashi
- Studio: ytv
- Original network: NNS (ytv, Nippon TV)
- Original run: July 24, 2022 – September 25, 2022
- Episodes: 10
- icon

New Nobunaga Chronicles: High School is a Battlefield (新・信長公記 〜ノブナガくんと私〜, Shin Shinchō Kōki: Nobunaga-kun to Watashi; 'The New Official History of Nobunaga: Nobunaga and Me') is a Japanese manga series written and illustrated by Shinobu Kaitani. It was first serialized in Kodansha's seinen manga magazine Weekly Young Magazine March 2019 to June 2020 and later on the Comic Days manga application from July 2020 to September 2021, with its chapters collected in eight tankōbon volumes. A ten-episode television drama adaptation aired from July to September 2022.

== Characters ==
Nobunaga Oda (織田 信長, Oda Nobunaga)
Portrayed by: Ren Nagase
Oda Nobunaga's clone.
Miyabi Kusakabe (日下部 みやび, Kusakabe Miyabi)
Portrayed by: Anna Yamada
The class president.
Ieyasu Tokugawa
Portrayed by: Yukiyoshi Ozawa
Tokugawa Ieyasu's clone.
Hideyoshi Toyotomi
Portrayed by: Daigo Nishihata
Toyotomi Hideyoshi's clone.
Kanbei Kuroda
Portrayed by: Gaku Hamada
Kuroda Kanbei's clone.
Masamune Date
Portrayed by: Shohei Miura
Date Masamune's clone.
Mitsuhide Akechi
Portrayed by: Riku Hagiwara
Akechi Mitsuhide's clone.
Shingen Takeda (武田 信玄, Takeda Shingen)
Portrayed by: Shinnosuke Mitsushima
Takeda Shingen's clone.
Kenshin Uesugi (上杉 謙信, Uesugi Kenshin)
Portrayed by: Atsuhiro Inukai
Uesugi Kenshin's clone.
Naomasa Ii
Portrayed by: Taro Suruga
Ii Naomasa's clone.
Shigeharu Takenaka
Portrayed by: Shuntarō Yanagi
Takenaka Shigeharu's clone.
Tadakatsu Honda
Portrayed by: Ryouhei Abe
Honda Tadakatsu's clone.
Kiyomasa Katō
Portrayed by: Kenta Suga
Katō Kiyomasa's clone.
Tadatsugu Sakai
Portrayed by: Seiya Osada
Sakai Tadatsugu's clone.
Yasumasa Sakakibara
Portrayed by: Shūichirō Naitō
Sakakibara Yasumasa's clone.
Motonari Mōri
Portrayed by: Hisamichi Kataoka
Mōri Motonari's clone.
Toshiie Maeda
Portrayed by: Kouta Nomura
Maeda Toshiie's clone.
Yukimura Sanada
Portrayed by: Yūta Tanokura
Sanada Yukimura's clone.
Yoshimoto Imagawa
Portrayed by: Kōya Matsudai
Imagawa Yoshimoto's clone.
Takanobu Ryūzōji
Portrayed by: Taisei Kusano
Ryūzōji Takanobu's clone.

== Media ==
=== Manga ===
Written and illustrated by Shinobu Kaitani, New Nobunaga Chronicles was serialized in Kodansha's seinen manga magazine Weekly Young Magazine from March 25, 2019, to June 15, 2020. The series was later transferred to the Comic Days manga application, where it ran from July 6, 2020, to September 6, 2021. Kodansha collected its chapters in eight tankōbon volumes, released from July 5, 2019, to November 18, 2021.

==== Volumes ====
No.	Japanese release date	Japanese ISBN
1	July 5, 2019	978-4-06-516358-0
2	October 4, 2019	978-4-06-517232-2
3	January 6, 2020	978-4-06-518221-5
4	April 6, 2020	978-4-06-519202-3
5	August 5, 2020	978-4-06-520468-9
6	December 9, 2020	978-4-06-521720-7
7	May 12, 2021	978-4-06-522587-5
8	November 18, 2021	978-4-06-525874-3

=== Drama ===
In May 2022, it was announced that the series would receive a television drama adaptation; it aired for ten episodes from July 24 to September 25 of that same year on NNS stations, including Yomiuri TV and Nippon TV.
