= Aju Makita =

Japanese actress (born 2002)

- 蒔田 彩珠
- Makita in 2026
- Born: August 7, 2002 (age 24); Kanagawa Prefecture, Japan
- Occupation: Actress
- Years active: 2009–present
- Agent: Stardust Promotion
- Website: www.stardust.co.jp/talent/section2/makitaaju/

Aju Makita (蒔田 彩珠, Makita Aju; born 7 August 2002) is a Japanese actress.

== Early life ==
Makita is the youngest of three siblings and has two older brothers.

== Career ==
Born in Kanagawa Prefecture, Makita made her acting debut at age 7. In 2012, she appeared in the TV drama Going My Home directed by Hirokazu Kore-eda and has since acted in his films After the Storm (2016), The Third Murder (2017), Shoplifters (2018) and Look Back (2026). She won the best newcomer award at the Hochi Film Award in 2018 for Shino Can't Say Her Name, directed by Hiroaki Yuasa. She then won the 2020 Mainichi Film Award for Best Supporting Actress as well as the Hochi Film Award for best supporting actress for her role as a pregnant teenager in Naomi Kawase's True Mothers, which was selected for the 2020 Cannes Film Festival. Her performance in the film garnered praise from such reviewers as those in The Guardian, the Los Angeles Times, The Hollywood Reporter, and the South China Morning Post.

== Filmography ==
=== Film ===
Year	Title	Role	Notes	Ref.
2016	After the Storm	Aju		
2017	The Third Murder	Yuka Shigemori		
2017	The Light Dances	Nagisa	Lead role; short film	
2018	Shoplifters	Sayaka Shibata		
2018	My Friend "A"	Yui Shiraishi		
2018	The Cat in Their Arms	Caliby / Hono Nakayama		
2018	Shino Can't Say Her Name	Kayo Okazaki	Lead role	
2019	Strawberry Song	A girl affected by the disaster		
2020	True Mothers	Hikari Katakura		
2020	#HandballStrive	Kurosawa		
2020	Under the Stars	Mah-chan		
2021	Child of Kamiari Month	Kanna (voice)	Lead role	
2021	DIVOC-12		Lead role; "Yen" segment	
2021	99.9 Criminal Lawyer: The Movie	Eri Nagumo		
2022	Pure Japanese	Ayumi		
2022	To Me, the One Who Loved You	Shiori Satō (voice)		
2022	To Every You I've Loved Before	Shiori Satō (voice)		
2023	In Love and Deep Water	Shiori Hagiwara		
2024	Happiness	Yuma Yamagishi	Lead role	
2025	Farewell, Saranghae, Farewell	Hitomi	Lead role; short film	
2025	Vanishing World	Amane	Lead role	
2026	Kingdom 5: The Clash of Souls	Xiang		
2026	Look Back	Kyomoto	Lead role	
2026	Bye Bye Love: Detective Is in the Bar	Akemi		

=== Television ===
Year	Title	Role	Notes	Ref.
2012	Going My Home	Moe Tsuboi		
2016	Daddy Sister	13-year-old Tamaki Mizuta	Asadora	
2018	An Invisible Cradle	Chie Nakamoto	Episode 2	
2020	Kotonoha	Kaori Itō	Lead role; TV movie	
2021	Welcome Home, Monet	Michi Nagaura	Asadora	
2022	If My Wife Becomes an Elementary School Student.	Mai Niijima		
2023	The Makanai: Cooking for the Maiko House	Ryōko		
2023	My Worst Friend	Hotaru Kasamatsu	Lead role	
2024	House of Ninjas	Nagi Tawara		
2024	Someone in This Town	Maki Mochizuki	Miniseries	
2025	Mr. Mikami's Classroom	Aoi Tominaga		
2025	Doctor Price	Aki Yonaga		
2026	Reboot	Tsubasa Adachi		
2026	Rock Paper Landmine	Kazahi Koda	Lead role	

=== Stage ===
Year	Title	Role	Notes	Ref.
2018	La Strada	Gelsomina		

=== Music videos ===
Year	Song	Artist	Ref.
2018	Mizuiro no Hibi	Shishamo	
2020	Canary	Kenshi Yonezu	
2022	Koi-kaze ni Nosete	Vaundy	

== Awards and nominations ==
Year	Award	Category	Work(s)	Result	Ref.
2018	43rd Hochi Film Awards	Best New Artist	Shino Can't Say Her Name	Won	
2020	45th Hochi Film Awards	Best Supporting Actress	True Mothers	Won	
2020	33rd Nikkan Sports Film Awards	Best Supporting Actress	True Mothers and Under the Stars	Nominated	
2020	33rd Nikkan Sports Film Awards	Best Newcomer	True Mothers and Under the Stars	Nominated	
2021	42nd Yokohama Film Festival	Best Supporting Actress	True Mothers and Under the Stars	Won	
2021	75th Mainichi Film Awards	Best Supporting Actress	True Mothers	Won	
2021	63rd Blue Ribbon Awards	Best Supporting Actress	True Mothers	Nominated	
2021	94th Kinema Junpo Awards	Best Supporting Actress	True Mothers	Won	
2021	44th Japan Academy Film Prize	Newcomer of the Year	True Mothers	Won	
2021	15th Asian Film Awards	Best Supporting Actress	True Mothers	Won	
2022	25th Nikkan Sports Drama Grand Prix	Best Supporting Actress	Welcome Home, Monet	Won	
