= Ren Nagase =

Japanese actor and singer (born 1999)

- 永瀬廉
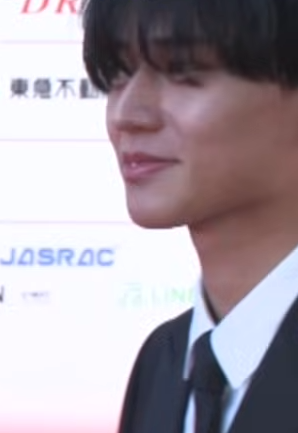
- Nagase at the 2026 Music Awards Japan
- Born: January 23, 1999 (age 27); Tokyo, Japan
- Other name: Renren
- Education: Meiji Gakuin University
- Occupations: Actor; Singer; Idol
- Years active: 2011–present
- Agents: Johnny & Associates (2011–2023); Starto Entertainment (2024–present)
- Musical career
- Genre: J-pop
- Instrument: Vocals
- Label: Universal Music Japan
- Member of: King & Prince
- Website: Ren Nagase on Instagram; King & Prince (Starto Entertainment); King & Prince (Universal Music Japan)

Ren Nagase (Japanese: 永瀬 廉, Hepburn: Nagase Ren; born January 23, 1999) is a Japanese actor and singer. He is a member of the boy band King & Prince and Mr. King. His nickname is "Renren." His agency is King & Prince K.K. He currently works at Starto Entertainment.

== History ==
Born in Tokyo, Nagase grew up in Osaka from kindergarten to second grade, and from sixth grade to first grade of high school. He speaks Kansai dialect, having spent much of his youth. His mother sent his resume without telling him. After having an audition, he joined the Johnny & Associates on April 3, 2011. He was a member of Kansai Johnny's Jr. Nagase was a member of the Kansai Johnny's Jr. group Ae Shonen. He formed the unit Naniwa Oji, with Daigo Nishihata and Ryusei Onishi in 2012. Nishihata and Onishi later became members of Naniwa Danshi.

Nagase returned to Tokyo due to his family's job transfer. He was selected as a member of the limited-time unit Mr. King vs Mr. Prince. He formed it on June 5, 2015, and has been active as Mr. King since 2016.

In April 2017, he entered the Department of Sociology at Meiji Gakuin University.

On May 23, 2018, he made his CD debut as King & Prince with the single Cinderella Girl. In 2019, he had a leading role in the film According to My Butler, and in the Fuji Television's special drama Fly, Boys, Fly! We Are Now Cabin Attendants!.

Nagase won the 44th Japan Academy Film Prize for Best New Actor for the film Wimpy Pedal. In 2021, he had a leading role for the series Welcome Home, Monet. He won the 38th Best Geninist Award in the general selection category for the first time.

In 2022, Nagase starred in the NHK drama Wagemon: Nagasaki Interpreter. This was his first full-fledged jidaigeki. He played a clone of Oda Nobunaga in New Nobunaga Chronicle: High School Is a Battlefield, and won the 26th Nikkan Sports Drama Grand Prix for Best Actor in a summer drama.

On September 15, 2023, he reported on his blog that he graduated from the Department of Sociology, Meiji Gakuin University.

On January 23, 2024, he launched his personal official Instagram.

== Relationships ==
His decision to enroll at Meiji Gakuin University was based on the recommendation of former Timelesz member Kento Nakajima. Nagase worked with Kis-My-Ft2 member Yuta Tamamori. He is a game companion of Kazunari Ninomiya of Arashi and Ryosuke Yamada of Hey! Say! JUMP. Nagase also worked with Nishihata and Yoshinori Masakado of Ae! Group for Johnny's since 2011. Nishihata and Masakado also appeared on Nagase's Instagram Live, and in each television series. Nagase's first collaboration song Shimi (Stain), which he sang with Nishihata and Masakado, was included on King & Prince's sixth album Re:Era. (Note: The title comes from the fact that 3 April, the date of their entry into the company, can be read as "shimi" in Japanese. In Japanese, shimi means stain.)

== Filmography ==
=== Television ===
| Year | Title | Role | Notes | Ref. |
|---|---|---|---|---|
| 2013 | The Knife and the Sword | Mori Ranmaru | | |
| 2019 | Where Have My Skirts Gone? | Shuichi Akechi | | |
| 2019 | Fly, Boys, Fly! We Are Now Cabin Attendants! | Chisora Asakawa | | |
| 2021 | Welcome Home, Monet | Ryo Oikawa | Asadora | |
| 2022 | Wagemon – Nagasaki Interpreter | Sota Ishima | Lead role | |
| 2022 | New Nobunaga Chronicle: High School Is a Battlefield | Nobunaga Oda | Lead role | |
| 2023 | Hold My Hand at Twilight | Oto Umino | | |
| 2023 | The Last Man: The Blind Profiler | Izumi Godo | | |
| 2024 | Alice in Wonderful Kitchen | Kosei Sakae | | |
| 2024 | Tokyo Tower | Toru Kojima | Lead role | |
| 2024 | Tokyo Tower Spin-off | Toru Kojima | Episode 2 | |
| 2025 | Love Is Hard for a Rich Man | Subaru Tendou | Lead role | |

=== Film ===
| Year | Title | Role | Notes | Ref. |
|---|---|---|---|---|
| 2014 | Nin-Jani Sanjo! Battle for the Future | Kazaha of Recollection | | |
| 2019 | According to My Butler | Karui Karasuma | Lead role | |
| 2020 | Yowamushi Pedal: Up the Road | Sakamichi Onoda | Lead role | |
| 2022 | Midnight Maiden War | Me | Lead role | |
| 2023 | The Innocent Game | Kiyoyoshi Kuga | Lead role | |
| 2023 | Doraemon: Nobita's Sky Utopia | Sonya (voice) | | |
| 2024 | Drawing Closer | Akito Hayasaka | Lead role | |
| 2024 | Fureru | Aki Onoda (voice) | Lead role | |
| 2025 | The Last Man: The Movie – First Love | Izumi Godo | | |
| 2026 | The Ogre's Bride | Reiya Kiryuin | Lead role | |
| 2027 | A List for Tomorrow | Kota Misaki | Taiwanese-Japanese film | |

== Other Activities ==
=== Music Programs ===
- Nippon TV Music Festival Premium Music 2022 (March 30, 2022, Nippon TV) – Host
- Nippon TV Music Festival Premium Music 2023 (March 22, 2023, Nippon TV) – Host
- The Yoru mo Hippare (May 24, 2025, Nippon TV) – Host
- Music Capsule: Jinsei no Oshi Song (October 9, 2025 – , TV Tokyo) – Host

=== Radio ===
- King & Prince Nagase Ren's Radio Garden (June 13, 2019 – , Nippon Cultural Broadcasting)

=== Commercial ===
- Kenei Pharmaceutical Co., Ltd. (September, 2020 – )
- Honda – Honda Heart (February 28, 2022 – )
- Ferrero Rocher (October 2, 2024 – ) – Brand ambassador
- Universal Music "#Bokura no Fuyukyoku Campaign" (December 2, 2024 – )
- Ajinomoto Frozen Foods "AJINOMOTO Gyoza" (April 2, 2025 – )

=== Events ===
- Rakuten GirlsAward 2019 Spring/Summer (May 18, 2019, Makuhari Messe) – secret guest

== Awards and nominations ==
| Year | Award | Work | Category | Result | Ref. |
|---|---|---|---|---|---|
| 2021 | 44th Japan Academy Film Prize | Yowamushi Pedal: Up the Road | Newcomer of the Year | Won | |
| 2022 | TV station Drama Awards 2021 | Welcome Home, Monet | Best Supporting Actor | Won | |
| 2024 | TV station Drama Awards 2023 | Hold My Hand at Twilight | Best Supporting Actor | Won | |
| 2026 | 29th Nikkan Sports Drama Grand Prix | Reboot | Best Supporting Actor | Won | |
