= Jun Inoue =

Japanese tarento, singer and actor

- 井上 順
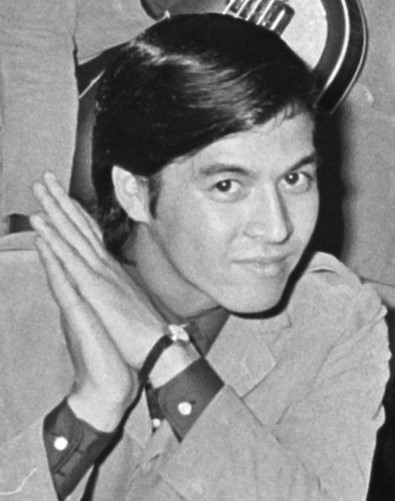
- Jun Inoue in 1966
- Born: February 21, 1947 (age 79); Shibuya, Tokyo, Japan
- Other name: Junji Inoue (former stage name)
- Education: Seijo Gakuen Junior High School and High School (dropped out)
- Occupations: Tarento; singer; actor
- Years active: 1963–
- Agent: Oh Enterprise
- Spouse: Emi Aoki (–1982)
- Website: www.oh-enter.co.jp/artist/2 (in Japanese)

Jun Inoue (井上 順, Inoue Jun; born 21 February 1947) is a Japanese tarento, singer, actor, and comedian. His former stage name is Junji Inoue (井上 順之, Inoue Junji).

== Discography ==
=== Singles ===
| Year | Title |
|---|---|
| 1970 | "Jinsei wa sonna kurikaeshi" |
| 1971 | "Kinō-Kyō-Ashita" |
| 1971 | "Osewa ni narimashita" |
| 1972 | "Namida" |
| 1972 | "Kōfuku Dorobō" |
| 1972 | "Love Song" |
| 1973 | "Shiawase-kun" |
| 1973 | "Tsukimisō no Uta" |
| 1973 | "Niji" |
| 1974 | "Aijō Monogatari" |
| 1976 | "Tomoyo Nake" |
| 1978 | "I'm Clyde" |
| 1979 | "Ike Nee ike Nee mō ikenee" |
| 1980 | "Kaze no Naka" |
| 1986 | "Bishō o anata ni" |
| 1995 | "Nantonaku nantonaku (New Vocal Version)" |
| 2003 | "Tetopettenson" |

=== Original albums ===
| Year | Title | Notes |
|---|---|---|
| 1971 | Kinō-Kyō-Ashita / Jun Inoue no First | |
| 1971 | Love / Junji to Emi no Sekai | with Emi Aoki |

=== Live albums ===
| Year | Title |
|---|---|
| 1973 | Jun Inoue: Happy Concert |

== Filmography ==
=== TV drama ===
| Year | Title | Role | Notes | Ref. |
|---|---|---|---|---|
| 2019 | Idaten | Juichi Tsushima | Taiga drama | |
| 2021 | Welcome Home, Monet | Kazumasa Anzai | Asadora | |
| 2023 | Ranman | Hiroshi Sato | Asadora | |
| 2023–26 | Vivant | Hiromichi Nogi | 2 seasons | |

=== Films ===
| Year | Title | Role | Notes | Ref. |
|---|---|---|---|---|
| 1997 | Welcome Back, Mr. McDonald | Mitsutoshi Hirose / Heinrich | | |
| 2016 | A Sower of Seeds 3 | Koichi Takahashi | | |
