= Kumiko Goto =

Japanese model, talent and actress (born 1974)

- 後藤久美子
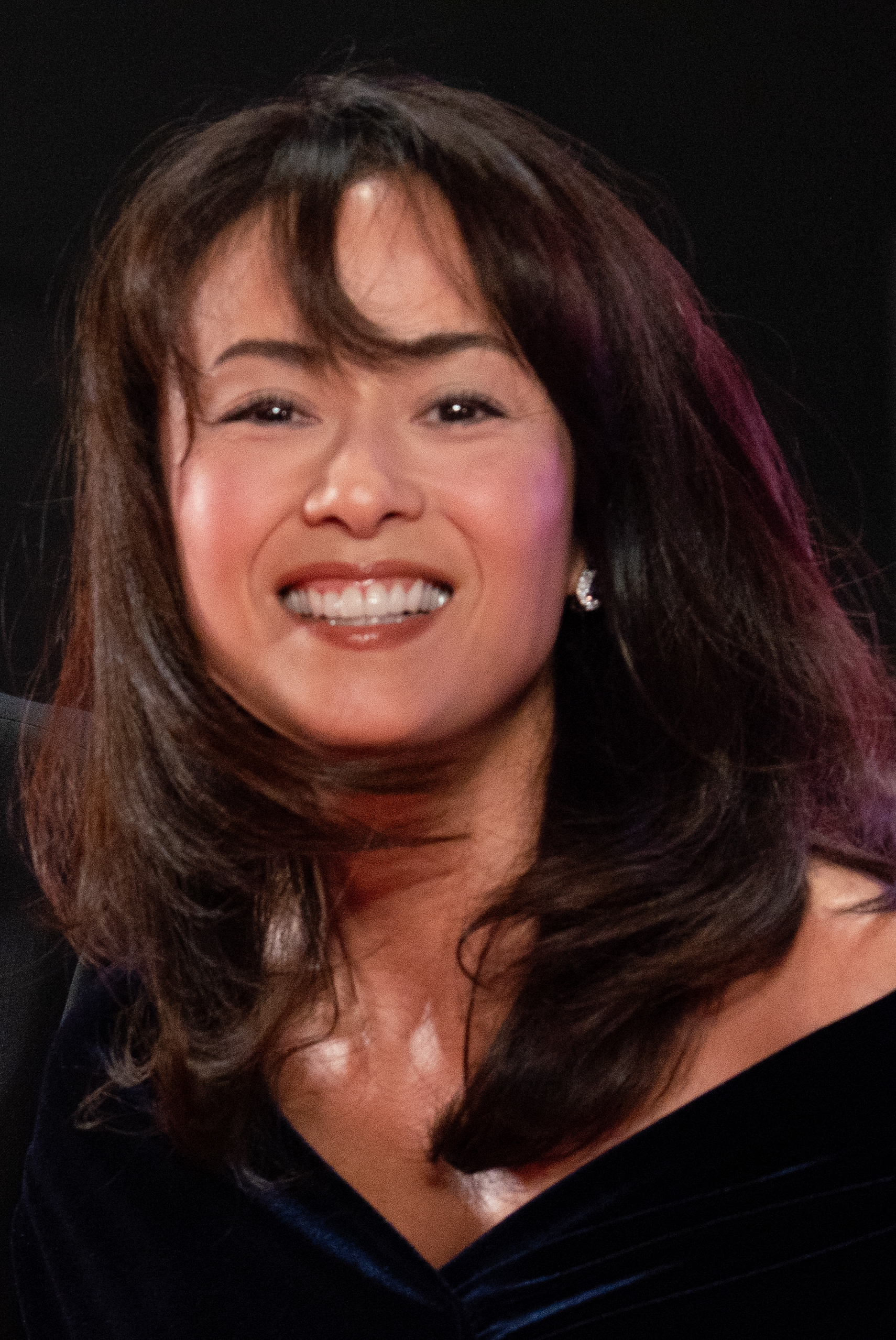
- Goto in 2019
- Born: March 26, 1974 (age 52); Tokyo, Japan
- Occupations: Singer; actress
- Spouse: Jean Alesi (m. 1995; div. 2026)
- Children: 3, including Giuliano
- Musical career
- Years active: 1987–1988
- Website: beamie.jp/t/kumiko_goto.html

Kumiko Goto (後藤 久美子, Gotō Kumiko; born on March 26, 1974) is a Japanese actress, model, and former singer active in the 1980s. As an actress, she is known for starring in the Otoko wa Tsurai yo films and the Jackie Chan film City Hunter. In 1995, she quit her acting career and married French racing driver Jean Alesi, with whom she has three children, daughter Helena and sons Giuliano and John.

== Filmography ==
=== TV shows ===
- Dokuganryū Masamune (NHK, 1987), young Megohime
- Mama wa Idol (TBS, 1987)
- Kaze Shojo (NTV, 1988)
- Tsukai! Rock-n-Roll Toori (TBS, 1988)
- Taiheiki (NHK, 1991), Kitabatake Akiie
- Mo Namida wa Misenai (Fuji TV, 1993)
- DCU (TBS, 2022), Maria Silva

=== Films ===
- Memories of You (1988)
- Otoko wa Tsurai yo series:
  - Tora-san, My Uncle (1989)
  - Tora-san Takes a Vacation (1990)
  - Tora-san Confesses (1991)
  - Tora-San Makes Excuses (1992)
  - Tora-san to the Rescue (1995)
  - Tora-san, Wish You Were Here (2019)
- City Hunter (1993)
- Camp de Aimasho (1995)

=== Commercial ===
- Denon "Concept" (1987-1988)
- Mazda Carol (1995-1996)
- Formula 1 97 (1997)
- JR East (1987–)
- Kirin "Kirin 1000 (Southern)" (2010–)

== Discography ==
=== Single ===
- Teardrop (released March 18, 1987)

== Awards ==
Year	Award	Category	Work(s)	Result	Ref
1988	12th Elan d'or Awards	Newcomer of the Year	Herself	Won	
1988	1st Nikkan Sports Film Awards	Best Newcomer	Memories of You	Won	
1989	12th Japan Academy Film Prize	Newcomer of the Year	Memories of You	Won	
2021	44th Japan Academy Film Prize	Best Supporting Actress	Tora-san, Wish You Were Here	Nominated	
