= The End of the World with You =

Japanese manga series

- Cover of vols. 1 and 2 of the Japanese version

僕らのミクロな終末 (Bokura no Mikuro na Shūmatsu)
- Genre: Boys' love, science fiction romance
- Manga
- Written by: Maki Marukido
- Published by: Shodensha
- Imprint: On BLUE Comics
- Magazine: On BLUE
- Original run: February 25, 2020 – December 25, 2021
- Volumes: 2
- Television drama
- Directed by: Kōichirō Miki; Hirofumi Mori
- Produced by: Kazuyuki Shimizu; Miku Kawamura; Kaori Kagawa
- Written by: Kōichirō Miki
- Music by: Erina Koyama
- Studio: Rocket
- Licensed by: GagaOOLala
- Original network: ABC
- Original run: January 30, 2023 – March 20, 2023
- Episodes: 8
- icon

The End of the World with You (Japanese: 僕らのミクロな終末, Hepburn: Bokura no Mikuro na Shūmatsu; lit. "Our Microscopic End of the World") is a Japanese manga series by Maki Marukido. It was serialized in the bimonthly boys' love manga magazine On BLUE from February 25, 2020, to December 25, 2021.

A live-action television drama adaptation was broadcast on Asahi Broadcasting Corporation from January 30, 2023, to March 20, 2023.

== Plot ==
On May 10, a giant meteorite is predicted to collide with the Earth and end the world in 10 days. Masumi Nishina, an overworked salaryman, copes with the news by revisiting his university's library to spend the remainder of his life reading books. There, he reunites with Ritsu Kusakabe, a wealthy company CEO and a media personality. Ritsu is also Masumi's ex-boyfriend with whom he once shared a passionate romance 10 years ago that ended when Ritsu cheated on him and caused him to have a mental breakdown. Ritsu requests Masumi's help to dispose a corpse after testing some suicide pills. Masumi follows Ritsu to his condominium, where they find Yuma, a high school student, who is still alive. Yuma admits he wanted to die after the rejection of his crush and the death of his favorite idol singer, Madoka Kagami, but he regains the will to live under Masumi's encouragement and to return to Hamamatsu to be with his family.

With no gas or means of public transportation, the three are forced to spend several days going to Hamamatsu by bicycle. On the first night, the three rescue Meguru, a university student from Matsumoto and Madoka's younger sibling. The three decide to extend their trip to Matsumoto to ensure that Meguru returns home. Meanwhile, Masumi and Ritsu speculate that Yuma might have supernatural powers, as miracles have coincided with their journey.

The next evening, Meguru confronts Ritsu over Madoka's death, revealing that Ritsu was the last person she contacted before she died by suicide. Masumi attempts to calm Yuma, who is upset that Ritsu and Madoka personally know each other, but he is accidentally knocked over a ledge. Though Masumi survives with major injuries and a fever, a distraught Ritsu reveals that he is still in love with Masumi and regrets how he treated him. As Masumi recovers, he encourages Ritsu to reveal the truth to Meguru and Yuma. Ritsu confirms that Madoka decided to die by suicide after her girlfriend broke up with her and she was forced to leave her girl group, ending her singing career. As he was the last person Madoka had called before her death, he feels guilty that he was unable to save her. Later that evening, Ritsu attempts to ingest the remaining suicide pill, but Masumi narrowly stops him and gives him the resolve to live. Close to the end of their trip, Masumi realizes he has been grateful for the experiences he had throughout the trip and accepts his conflicted feelings towards Ritsu.

After sending Meguru home in Matsumoto, the three pay their respects to Madoka and take Meguru's family's car back to Hamamatsu, and then back to Masumi's apartment in Tokyo. On their way back, Ritsu and Masumi notice that the university library had been set on fire, and Masumi realizes he would have died if he had remained there. Ritsu and Masumi spend their last moments on Earth together consummating their love. When Masumi falls asleep, he has a dream where a giant Yuma flicks away the meteorite. Masumi and Ritsu wake up the next morning at the anticipated time of impact, only to notice that the sun has risen with no signs of the meteorite.

== Characters ==
Masumi Nishina (仁科 真澄, Nishina Masumi)
Portrayed by: Toshiki Seto (TV drama)
Masumi is a salaryman who leads a mundane, unlucky life and is overworked at his company.
Ritsu Kusakabe (日下部 律, Kusakabe Ritsu)
Portrayed by: Keisuke Nakata (TV drama)
Ritsu is Masumi's ex-boyfriend and a CEO of a company. 10 years ago, they went to the same university and dated. Ritsu's upbringing has warped his idea of love and he initially has casual romantic relationships with both men and women. In university, he was known as the "club killer" as he had caused multiple school clubs to disband by dating and having sex with multiple members of each club. Years later, Ritsu comes to realize he truly loves Masumi and regrets how he treated him.
Yuma Hirose (広瀬 遊馬, Hirose Yūma)
Portrayed by: Sōshō Tomimoto (TV drama)
Yuma is a 16-year-old high school student from Hamamatsu. He initially attempts to die by suicide after he was rejected by his crush and the death of his favorite singer, Madoka Kagami. He is described to be "pure-hearted" and many miraculous coincidences that occurred throughout the main characters' journey are speculated by Masumi and Ritsu to be caused by him.
Meguru Kagami (嘉神 めぐる, Kagami Meguru)
Portrayed by: Baku Idegami (TV drama)
Meguru is a 19-year-old university student from Matsumoto who went to Tokyo to attend school and is Madoka's younger sibling. Masumi and Ritsu later learn that Meguru is male and enjoys posting photos of himself crossdressing in lingerie on social media.
Madoka Kagami (嘉神 まどか, Kagami Madoka)
Portrayed by: Baku Idegami (TV drama)
Madoka is a popular idol singer nicknamed Maataso (まあたそ) who died by suicide. Prior to her death, she was Ritsu's friend and tells him in confidence that she is lesbian and secretly dating one of the members from her girl group. When her girlfriend breaks up with her, Madoka is forced out of her group and loses her singing career, causing her to fall into depression.
Yosuke Hashimoto (橋本 陽介, Hashimoto Yōsuke)
Portrayed by: Takehiro Ōtsuki (TV drama)
Hashimoto is Masumi's friend from university with whom he was in the same club.

== Media ==
=== Manga ===
The End of the World with You was written and illustrated by Maki Marukido. It was serialized in the bimonthly boys' love manga magazine On BLUE from vol. 45 released on February 25, 2020, to vol. 56 released on December 25, 2021. The chapters were later released in two bound volumes by Shodensha under the On BLUE Comics imprint on February 25, 2022. In vol. 63 of On BLUE released on February 25, 2023, Marukido announced that she would be releasing a sequel side story titled Another Ordinary Day with You (僕らのミクロな日常, Bokura no Mikuro na Nichijō).

In 2022, Marukido stated through an interview with Chill Chill that she wanted to draw something different than her previous works, which showed an uke who was the "male version of a femme fatale" and was often told from the perspective of a seme. When describing Masumi, she stated that she wanted to draw a gloomy, introverted guy who is "at the mercy of the seme", and that she wanted to draw Ritsu and Masumi as a "plain heroine" with a "seme who makes her heart flutter" as seen in shōjo manga. Marukido mentioned that Ritsu had originally been a more "evil" character, but she toned him down after her assistant's negative reaction.

Marukido also stated that the COVID-19 pandemic took place when she was in the middle of writing the manga's second chapter, and she felt her gloominess about the situation was shown in each chapter. As the characters in the story go on a biking trip, Marukido stated that she researched their travel times using Google Maps. She chose the title of the manga from a list of several suggestions made by her editor.

No.	Japanese release date	Japanese ISBN
1	February 25, 2022	9784396785369
2	February 25, 2022	9784396785376

=== Television drama ===
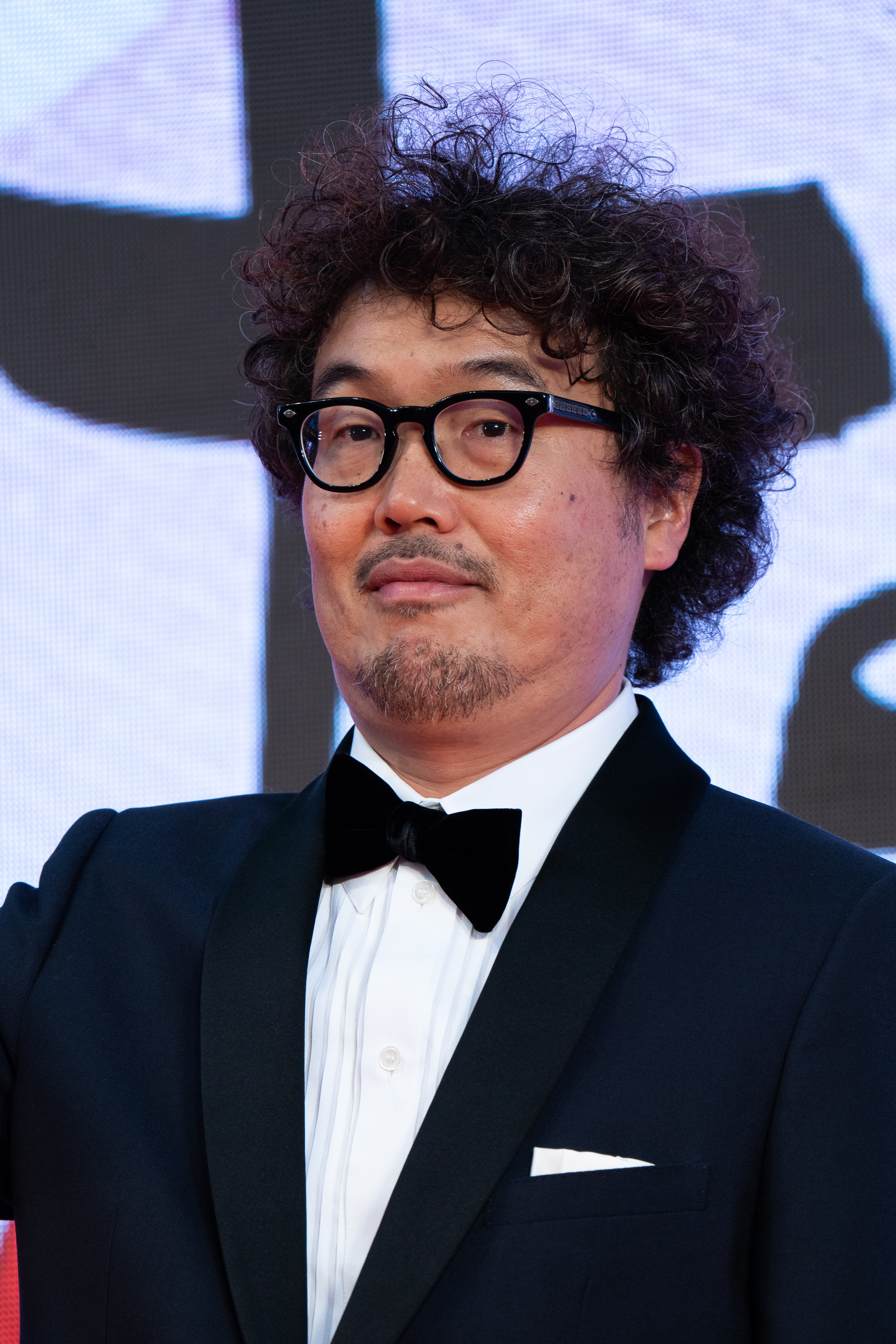
Kōichirō Miki (pictured in 2019) directed the live-action drama adaptation.

A live-action television drama adaptation of The End of the World with You was announced on November 22, 2022. The series was broadcast from January 30, 2023, (Note: ABC lists the premiere date as January 29, 2023, at 00:55, which is January 30, 2023, at 12:55 a.m.) to March 20, 2023, on ABC, for a total of 8 episodes. Outside of Japan, it was also released internationally on GagaOOLala. The series stars Toshiki Seto as Masumi and Keisuke Nakata as Ritsu. The supporting cast includes Sōshō Tomimoto as Yuma and Baku Idegami as Meguru and Madoka. Additional cast members include Takehiro Ōtsuki as Hashimoto, Miyuu Nishimura as Misa Taniguchi, Kisuke Iida as Meguru's father, Ryoko Yui as Masumi's mother. The television drama adaptation was created by the studio Rocket. It is directed and written by Kōichirō Miki, with Hirofumi Mori as an additional director. Kazuyuki Shimizu serves as executive producer, with Miku Kawamura and Kaori Kagawa as other producers. Erina Koyama is in charge of music. The theme song is "Futatabi" by Hiroba (a music project formed by Ikimonogakari member Yoshiki Mizuno) featuring Ai Otsuka.

==== Episodes ====
No.	Title (Note: All English titles are taken from GagaOOLala.)	Directed by	Written by	Original release date
1	"The Beginning of Dangerous Love"; Transliteration: "Kiken na Renjō no Hajimari" (Japanese: 危険な恋情の始まり)	Kōichirō Miki	Kōichirō Miki	January 30, 2023
2	"Broken Love Reunited"; Transliteration: "Togireta Aijō to no Saikai" (Japanese: 途切れた愛情との再会)	Kōichirō Miki	Kōichirō Miki	February 6, 2023
3	"Heartbeats from Death"; Transliteration: "Shūen ni Kiin Suru Kodō" (Japanese: 終焉に起因する鼓動)	Kōichirō Miki	Kōichirō Miki	February 13, 2023
4	"The End of the Gloomy Rain"; Transliteration: "Utsu Utsu to Shita Ame no Saki ni" (Japanese: 鬱々とした雨の先に)	Kōichirō Miki	Kōichirō Miki	February 20, 2023
5	"The Question That Occurs Along With Chaos"; Transliteration: "Konton to Tomo ni Umareru Giwaku" (Japanese: 混沌とともに生まれる疑惑)	Kōichirō Miki	Kōichirō Miki	February 27, 2023
6	"Whirlpool of Despair"; Transliteration: "Shinjitsu ga Motarasu Zetsubō no Uzu" (Japanese: 真実がもたらす絶望の渦)	Hirofumi Mori	Kōichirō Miki	March 6, 2023
7	"Body Temperature and Eye Contact"; Transliteration: "Majiwatta Shisen to Taion" (Japanese: 交わった視線と体温)	Hirofumi Mori	Kōichirō Miki	March 13, 2023
8	"Last Moment Longing For a Miracle"; Transliteration: "Kiseki o Katsubōshita Saigo" (Japanese: 奇跡を渇望した最期)	Kōichirō Miki	Kōichirō Miki	March 20, 2023

== Reception ==
Chill Chill praised the artistic direction of the manga covers for featuring a panoramic image when lined up together. For the live-action television drama adaptation, Chill Chill praised the portrayal of Masumi and Ritsu's relationship, as well as Keisuke Nakata's portrayal of Ritsu. The Television reviewed the live-action drama adaptation favorably, stating that the drama was "sad" but leaves a "warm and sunny feeling."
