= Tora-san Makes Excuses =

- Theatrical poster
- Directed by: Yoji Yamada
- Written by: Yoji Yamada; Yoshitaka Asama
- Produced by: Kiyoshi Shimizu; Hiro Fukazawa
- Starring: Kiyoshi Atsumi; Kumiko Goto
- Cinematography: Tetsuo Takaba; Mitsumi Hanada
- Edited by: Iwao Ishii
- Music by: Naozumi Yamamoto
- Distributed by: Shochiku
- Release date: December 26, 1992
- Running time: 101 minutes
- Country: Japan
- Language: Japanese
- Box office: $26 million

Tora-san Makes Excuses (男はつらいよ 寅次郎の青春, Otoko wa Tsurai yo: Torajirō no Seishun) is a 1992 Japanese comedy film directed by Yoji Yamada. It stars Kiyoshi Atsumi as Torajirō Kuruma (Tora-san), and Kumiko Goto as his nephew Mitsuo's Hidetaka Yoshioka love interest or "Madonna", Izumi. It also co-stars Masatoshi Nagase, who plays Mitsuo's rival for Izumi's affection and Mari Natsuki as Izumi's mother. Tora-San Makes Excuses is the forty-fifth entry in the popular, long-running Otoko wa Tsurai yo series.

== Cast ==
- Kiyoshi Atsumi as Torajirō
- Chieko Baisho as Sakura
- Jun Fubuki as Choko
- Masatoshi Nagase as Ryusuke
- Masami Shimojō as Kuruma Tatsuzō (Torajirō's uncle )
- Chieko Misaki as Tsune Kuruma (Torajirō's aunt)
- Hisao Dazai as Boss (Umetarō Katsura)
- Hidetaka Yoshioka as Mitsuo Suwa
- Kumiko Goto as Izumi Oikawa
- Gin Maeda as Hiroshi Suwa
- Mari Natsuki as Ayako Oikawa
- Gajirō Satō as Genkō
- Keiroku Seki as Ponshu
- Chishū Ryū as Gozen-sama

== Critical appraisal ==
The German-language site molodezhnaja gives Tora-san Makes Excuses three and a half out of five stars.

== Availability ==
Tora-san Makes Excuses was released theatrically on December 26, 1992. In Japan, the film was released on videotape in 1993 and 1996, and in DVD format in 2002 and 2008.

== Bibliography ==
=== English ===
- "OTOKO WA TSURAIYO -TORAJIRO NO SEISHUN". Complete Index to World Film.
- Otoko wa tsurai yo: Torajiro no seishun (1992) at IMDb

=== Japanese ===
- 男はつらいよ 寅次郎の青春 (1992). www.allcinema.net (in Japanese).
- "男はつらいよ 寅次郎の青春". Agency for Cultural Affairs. Archived from the original on 2012-03-26.
- 男はつらいよ 寅次郎の青春 (in Japanese). Japanese Movie Database.
- 男はつらいよ 寅次郎の青春 (in Japanese). Kinema Junpo. Archived from the original on 2012-03-24.
