= Midnight Swan =

2020 Japanese drama film

- Theatrical release poster
- Kanji: ミッドナイトスワン
- Revised Hepburn: Middonaito Suwan
- Directed by: Eiji Uchida
- Screenplay by: Eiji Uchida
- Story by: Eiji Uchida
- Produced by: Takeshi Moriya
- Starring: Tsuyoshi Kusanagi; Misaki Hattori; Asami Mizukawa
- Cinematography: Maki Ito
- Edited by: Yuichi Iwakiri
- Music by: Keiichiro Shibuya
- Production company: Culen
- Distributed by: Kino Films
- Release date: September 25, 2020 (Japan)
- Running time: 124 minutes
- Country: Japan
- Language: Japanese

Midnight Swan (Japanese: ミッドナイトスワン, Hepburn: Middonaito Suwan) is a 2020 Japanese drama film directed by Eiji Uchida, who also wrote the screenplay. It received nine nominations at the 44th Japan Academy Film Prize, including Director of the Year and Screenplay of the Year, winning for Picture of the Year, Outstanding Performance by an Actor in a Leading Role, and Newcomer of the Year.

== Plot ==
Nagisa is a transgender woman. Growing up as a man in Hiroshima, Nagisa faces prejudice and is ostracized by society. She leaves Hiroshima and lives in Tokyo where she works as a dancer in a nightclub. Her distant niece, Ichika, is a middle school student neglected by her mother. After being kicked out of her home, Ichika travels to Tokyo and starts living with Nagisa. Although initially reluctant, Nagisa takes Ichika in and eventually starts to care for the shy, isolated child. In return, Ichika slowly starts to open up, helped in part by her love of ballet.

== Cast ==
- Tsuyoshi Kusanagi as Nagisa
- Misaki Hattori as Sakurada Ichika
- Asami Mizukawa as Saori Sakurada
- Tomorowo Taguchi as Mama Yoko
- Sei Matobu as Mika Katahira
- Shunsuke Tanaka as Nagisa's colleague
- Kaito Yoshimura as Nagisa's colleague
- Reo Sanada as Nagisa's colleague
- Rinka Ueno as Rin
- Eriko Sato as Rin's mother
- Yusuke Hirayama as Rin's father
- Toshie Negishi as Nagisa's mother

== Reception ==
On the review aggregator website Rotten Tomatoes, 100% of 5 critics' reviews are positive.

Writing for The Japan Times, Mark Schilling gave the movie a positive review, calling it "a gloomy drama, with moments of realism and grace". Matthew Hernon of the same publication praised the portrayal of transgender issues and individualism through dance.

=== Accolades ===
Awards and nominations
Year	Award	Category	Recipient	Result	Ref.
2020	45th Hochi Film Award	Best New Actor	Misaki Hattori	Won	
2020	45th Hochi Film Award	Best Actor	Tsuyoshi Kusanagi	Nominated	
2020	Nikkan Sports Film Award	Best Newcomer	Misaki Hattori	Won	
2020	Nikkan Sports Film Award	Best Actor	Tsuyoshi Kusanagi	Nominated	
2021	63rd Blue Ribbon Awards	Best Actor	Tsuyoshi Kusanagi	Won	
2021	63rd Blue Ribbon Awards	Best Director	Eiji Uchida	Nominated	
2021	63rd Blue Ribbon Awards	Best Newcomer	Misaki Hattori	Nominated	
2021	63rd Blue Ribbon Awards	Best Picture	Midnight Swan	Nominated	
2021	63rd Blue Ribbon Awards	Best Supporting Actress	Asami Mizukawa and Sei Matobu	Nominated	
2021	44th Japan Academy Film Prize	Newcomer of the Year	Misaki Hattori	Won	
2021	44th Japan Academy Film Prize	Outstanding Performance by an Actor in a Leading Role	Tsuyoshi Kusanagi	Won	
2021	44th Japan Academy Film Prize	Picture of the Year	Midnight Swan	Won	
2021	44th Japan Academy Film Prize	Director of the Year	Eiji Uchida	Nominated	
2021	44th Japan Academy Film Prize	Outstanding Achievement in Art Direction	Hiroyuki Agatsuma	Nominated	
2021	44th Japan Academy Film Prize	Outstanding Achievement in Cinematography	Maki Ito	Nominated	
2021	44th Japan Academy Film Prize	Outstanding Achievement in Lighting Direction	Shingo Inoue	Nominated	
2021	44th Japan Academy Film Prize	Outstanding Achievement in Sound Recording	Hironori Ito	Nominated	
2021	44th Japan Academy Film Prize	Screenplay of the Year	Eiji Uchida	Nominated	
2021	30th Japanese Movie Critics Awards	Best Newcomer	Misaki Hattori	Won	
2021	30th Japanese Movie Critics Awards	Best Music	Keiichiro Shibuya	Nominated	
2021	75th Mainichi Film Awards	Best Music	Keiichiro Shibuya	Won	
2021	75th Mainichi Film Awards	Best Actor	Tsuyoshi Kusanagi	Nominated	
2021	75th Mainichi Film Awards	Best Newcomer	Misaki Hattori	Nominated	
2021	23rd Far East Film Festival	Golden Mulberry Award (Gelso d'Oro)	Midnight Swan	Won	
