= Toshiki Seto =

Japanese actor (born 1995)

- 瀬戸利樹
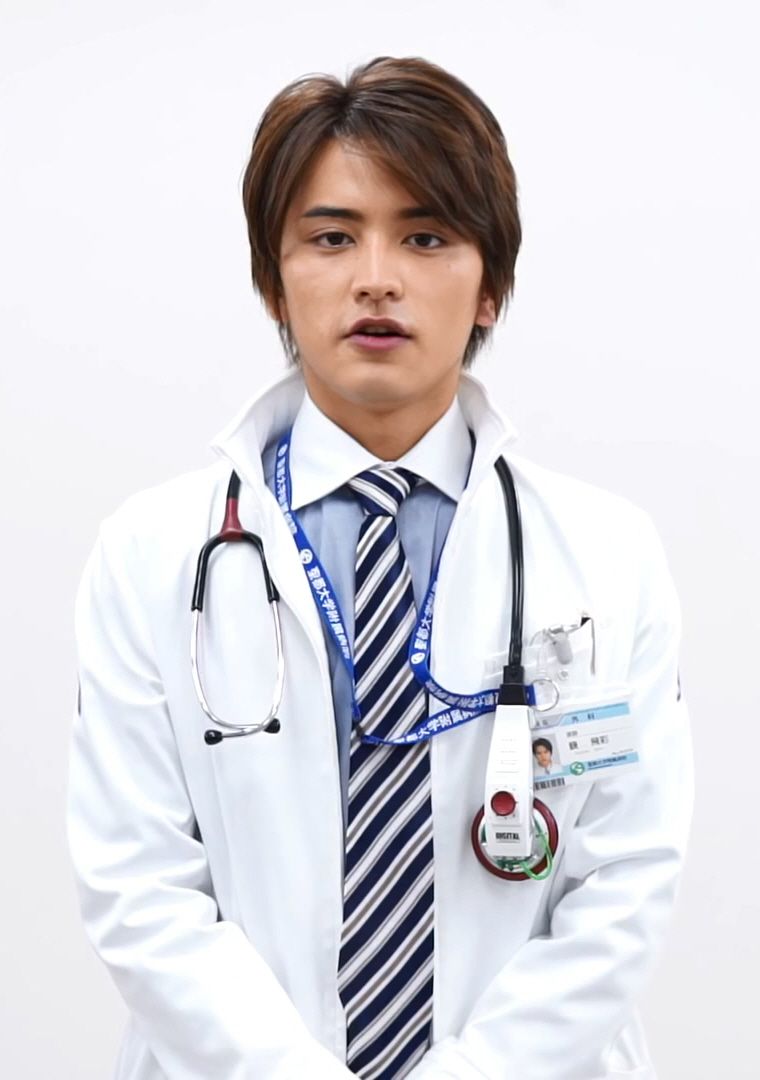
- Seto in a promotional video for Kamen Rider Ex-Aid (2017)
- Born: October 7, 1995 (age 30); Chiba Prefecture, Japan
- Occupation: Actor
- Years active: 2013–present
- Agent: Kon-Rush
- Height: 176 cm (5 ft 9 in)
- Website: Official profile

Toshiki Seto (瀬戸 利樹, Seto Toshiki; born October 7, 1995) is a Japanese actor.

== Biography ==
In 2013, Seto was part of Ken-On's Next Generation and in 2014 he debuted in the drama Yowakutemo Katemasu. His film debut was in Strayer's Chronicle. In August 2015, Seto was affiliated with Ken-On. In March 2022, he left Ken-On. He is now affiliated with Kon-Rush. His skill is playing baseball and his hobby is watching films.

== Filmography ==
=== TV Drama ===
Year	Title	Role	Network	Notes	Ref.
2014	Minowa: Love and Law	Satoshi Adachi	YTV	episode 9	
2014	Baseball Brainiacs	Shintaro Kiryu	NTV		
2014	Oie-san	Chozo	YTV		
2015	Kaseki no Hohoemi	Yamamoto	TV Asahi		
2015	The Emperor's Cook	Koshiro Akiyama	YTV, TBS	episode 8-10	
2016	Montage: Sanokuenji Ken Kitan	Tamotsu Yokomizo	Fuji TV		
2016	Higurashi no Baku Koro no Kai	Satoshi Hojo			
2016–17	Kamen Rider Ex-Aid	Hiiro Kagami/Kamen Rider Brave	TV Asahi	Lead role	
2018	Angels in White	Shunya Hino	Fuji TV, Tokai TV		
2018	Signal	Yuya Saito	Fuji TV	episode 8-10	
2018	Kamen Rider Zi-O	Hiiro Kagami/Kamen Rider Brave	TV Asahi	episode 3-4	
2018	The Guide to Late Night Bad Love	Ryo Kokubu	TV Asahi		
2018	Legal V Ex-lawyer Shoko Takanashi	Makoto Machimura	TV Asahi	episode 5	
2019	The School of Water Business	Tetta Otake	TBS, MBS		
2019	Fake Affair	Futa Yagami	NTV		
2020	The Lunchtime Detective	Kento Sakurai	NTV, YTV		
2020	Marry Me!	Shin Akiyasu	TV Asahi, ABC	Lead role	
2021	Cinderella is Online	Asahi Onoda	Fuji TV	Lead role	
2021	A Bad Boy Drinks Tea	Wataru Yamada	TV Tokyo, Amazon Prime Video	Lead role	
2021	My Fair Prince	Ryo Arisugawa	Fuji TV, FOD		
2022	DEATH Kyun Loop Doesn't Stop!	Shoya	LINE TV	Lead role	
2022	Senpai, This Can't Be Love!	Yuki Kaneda	MBS	Lead role	
2022	Roppongi Class	Kento Tachibana	Netflix, TV Asahi	episode 3	
2023	The End of the World With You	Masumi Nishina	ABC	Lead role	
2023	Play It Cool, Guys	Motoharu Igarashi	TV Tokyo	Lead role episode 7	

=== Films ===
Year	Title	Role	Other notes	Ref
2015	Strayer's Chronicle	Ryuji		
2016	Kamen Rider Heisei Generations: Dr. Pac-Man vs. Ex-Aid & Ghost with Legend Rider	Hiiro Kagami/Kamen Rider Brave		
2017	Kamen Rider × Super Sentai: Ultra Super Hero Taisen	Hiiro Kagami/Kamen Rider Brave, Kamen Rider True Brave	Dual role	
2019	Cheer Boys!!			
2020	Signal 100	Hayato Wada		
2020	Kaiji: Final Game	Taichi Sugawara		
2020	Over the Sky	Shin		
2021	What Happened to Our Nest Egg!?			

=== Video on demand ===
Year	Title	Role	Other notes
2017	Kamen Sentai Gorider	Hiiro Kagami/Kamen Rider Brave	Mini-series

=== Variety ===
Year	Title	Network
2015	Tsūkai TV Suka to Japan	Fuji TV

=== Music videos ===
Year	Title
2013	Leo Ieiri "Chocolate"
2014	Suzu "you can do it!"
2014	Suzu "Hikari no Kata e"
2015	Spyair "Fire Starter"
