= Doppelganger (2003 film) =

- Theatrical release poster
- Directed by: Kiyoshi Kurosawa
- Written by: Takeshi Furusawa; Kiyoshi Kurosawa
- Produced by: Motoo Kawabata; Takayuki Nitta; Atsushi Sato; Atsuyuki Shimoda
- Starring: Kōji Yakusho; Hiromi Nagasaku; Yūsuke Santamaria
- Cinematography: Noriyuki Mizuguchi
- Edited by: Kiyoshi Kurosawa; Masahiro Onaga
- Music by: Yusuke Hayashi
- Production companies: TOWANI; Amuse Pictures
- Distributed by: Amuse Pictures
- Release date: September 27, 2003 (Japan)
- Running time: 107 minutes
- Country: Japan
- Language: Japanese

Doppelganger (Japanese: ドッペルゲンガー, Hepburn: Dopperugengā) is a 2003 Japanese black comedy directed and co-written by Kiyoshi Kurosawa, starring Kōji Yakusho, Hiromi Nagasaku and Yūsuke Santamaria.

In the film, a robotic engineer frustrated with his life (Yakusho) suddenly encounters another version of himself (also played by Yakusho), who acts very differently than he does.

== Plot ==
At a medical instrument manufacturing company, timid engineer Michio Hayasaki (Kōji Yakusho) struggles to develop a robotic chair that could mobilise a clinically paralysed person. He realises he's not getting anywhere with it—not while his company keeps making demands and issuing deadlines on him. Highly stressed, Michio bitterly realises he doesn't have the courage to bite back.

Whilst arriving home from work, Michio is startled to find himself waiting on his doorstep. He soon sees it's not him, but a man who's the spitting image of him. Fearing he's having a mental breakdown, Michio wonders whether a legend that says one is destined to die soon after seeing their own doppelganger may be true. His apparent twin smoothly assures him that he has nothing to fear. Bemused, Hayasaki invites him to his home.

Michio eventually notices that while his doppelganger is identical to his looks, mannerisms and speech, the doppelganger's personality and attitude are drastically different from his own. Where he's too timid to get what he wants, his doppelganger has no qualms in getting what it wants. Where he's too afraid to speak out, his doppelganger speaks its mind. Where he's moderate with drinking, the doppelganger indulges heavily. Where he's detail-oriented, it doesn't pay much attention to details as it is more concerned with the result.

The doppelganger removes all sources of Michio's stress, reorganises his life for better, acquires all things he's yielded for, does rebellious things Hayasaki couldn't do, and assists with building the robotic chair that frustrates him for so long. Meanwhile, Michio learns to enjoy his doppelganger's seemingly nihilistic actions. However, he soon wonders whether his doppelganger has an agenda when he realises he's being dragged into madness.

== Cast ==
- Kōji Yakusho as Michio Hayasaki
- Hiromi Nagasaku as Yuka Nagai
- Yūsuke Santamaria as Kimishima
- Akira Emoto as Murakami
- Masahiro Toda as Aoki
- Hitomi Satō as Takano

== Reception ==
Josh Ralske of AllMovie gave the film 3.5 out of 5 stars. Mike Bracken of IGN praised Kōji Yakusho's performance for "the difficult task of playing two characters who are the same on the outside but totally opposite otherwise." Todd Brown of Twitch Film felt that the digital composites used to double Yakusho on screen are simply perfect.

Tom Mes of Midnight Eye noted that the film has many similarities in particular with Kurosawa's own 1996 V-Cinema Suit Yourself or Shoot Yourself: The Nouveau Riche, saying: "The cyclical structure of recurring events that formed the basis of that film's plot is reused in the final 30 minutes of Doppelgänger".
