= Ayumi Oka (actress) =

Japanese actress (born 1983)

Ayumi Oka (岡あゆみ Oka Ayumi, born September 18, 1983, in Tsu, Mie) is a Japanese actress. She has appeared in multiple television shows and films, including Naoki Hanzawa, Magerarenai Onna and Kinpachi-sensei.
