= Tora-san, Wish You Were Here =

2019 Japanese film

- Theatrical release poster
- Kanji: 男はつらいよ お帰り 寅さん
- Revised Hepburn: Otoko wa Tsurai yo Okaeri Torasan
- Directed by: Yoji Yamada
- Written by: Yoji Yamada; Yuzo Asahara
- Produced by: Hiroshi Fukazawa
- Starring: Kiyoshi Atsumi; Chieko Baisho; Gin Maeda; Hidetaka Yoshioka; Kumiko Goto; Mari Natsuki; Ruriko Asaoka
- Edited by: Iwao Ishii; Kazuhide Ishijima
- Music by: Naozumi Yamamoto; Junnosuke Yamamoto
- Distributed by: Shochiku
- Release date: December 27, 2019
- Running time: 116 minutes
- Country: Japan
- Language: Japanese

Tora-san, Wish You Were Here (男はつらいよ お帰り 寅さん, Otoko wa Tsurai yo Okaeri Torasan) is a 2019 Japanese film directed by Yoji Yamada. It is the fiftieth entry in the popular and long-running Otoko wa Tsurai yo series. Shooting began on October 20, 2018 and the film was released on December 27, 2019.

It stars Kiyoshi Atsumi as Torajirō Kuruma (Tora-san). Atsumi died in 1996 and he appears throughout the film as flashbacks, using footage from his dozens of performances as Tora-san in the previous films. It also stars Chieko Baisho, Gin Maeda, Hidetaka Yoshioka, Kumiko Goto, Mari Natsuki, and Ruriko Asaoka, all recreating their roles from the long running film series.

== Cast ==
- Kiyoshi Atsumi as Torajirō Kuruma, otherwise known as Tora-san
- Chieko Baisho as Sakura Suwa
- Ruriko Asaoka as Lily
- Hidetaka Yoshioka as Mitsuo Suwa
- Kumiko Goto as Izumi Bruna
- Gin Maeda as Hiroshi Suwa
- Mari Natsuki as Ayako Hara
- Chizuru Ikewaki as Setsuko Takano
- Hiyori Sakurada as Yuri Suwa, Mitsuo's daughter
- Isao Hashizume as Kazuo Oikawa
- Nenji Kobayashi as Kubota, Mitsuo's Father in Law
- Tatekawa Shiraku as Rakugo artist
- Takashi Sasano as Gozen-sama
- Jun Miho as Akemi
- Mari Hamada
- Tetsurō Degawa
- Cunning Takeyama
- Gajirō Satō
- Masayasu Kitayama
- Hayashiya Tamahei
- Taiki Matsuno
- Miu Tomita
- Sara Kurashima
- Sōtarō Tanaka
- Keisuke Kuwata

== Bibliography ==
=== Japanese ===
- 男はつらいよ新作で満男は小説家、寅さんも“登場” (in Japanese). asahi.com.
