= True Mothers =

2020 film

- Film poster
- Directed by: Naomi Kawase
- Written by: Naomi Kawase; Izumi Takahashi
- Produced by: Yumiko Takebe
- Starring: Hiromi Nagasaku; Arata Iura; Aju Makita; Miyoko Asada
- Cinematography: Yuta Tsukinaga; Naoki Sakakibara; Naomi Kawase
- Edited by: Tina Baz; Yoichi Shibuya
- Music by: Akira Kosemura; Tôn Thất An
- Production companies: Kumie; Kazumo; Kino Films; Kinoshita Group
- Release date: 16 September 2020 (Japan)
- Running time: 140 minutes
- Country: Japan
- Language: Japanese

True Mothers (Japanese: 朝が来る, Hepburn: Asa ga Kuru; lit. "Morning Comes") is a 2020 Japanese drama film directed by Naomi Kawase. Based on a 2015 novel by Mizuki Tsujimura, the film is about a boy, his adoptive parents, and his biological mother, the events of their lives shown jumping between the past and the present.

True Mothers was selected to be shown at the 2020 Cannes Film Festival.

In June 2020, the Toronto International Film Festival announced that True Mothers would be part of their 2020 festival. It was selected as the Japanese entry for the Best International Feature Film at the 93rd Academy Awards, but was not nominated.

== Plot ==
Kiyokazu (Arata Iura) and Satoko (Hiromi Nagasaku) Kurihara are a married couple attempting to start a family, only to discover that Kiyokazu has aspermia.

Hikari Katakura (Aju Makita), is a fourteen-year-old junior high school student. She falls in love with a male classmate, leading to a pure, mutual, and intense romance. They have sexual intercourse, and Hikari later finds out that she is pregnant; since she has not yet begun to menstruate, the discovery comes too late for her to have an abortion. Afraid of gossip and of Hikari losing her high future propspects, her family sends her away to Baby Baton, a nonprofit association that matches infertile couples with mothers who cannot or do not want to raise their biological children. Hikari and the other pregnant mothers, the majority of whom are young trafficked girls, find peace with each other while waiting to give birth.

After a long, painful, and ultimately unsuccessful period of fertility treatments, Satoko and Kiyokazu decide to quit and settle for a childless life until they watch TV program about Baby Baton. Upon watching the program, the Kuriharas realize that adoption could be a perfect alternative for them to build a normal family.

Hikari gives birth to a baby boy named Asato, whom Baby Baton matches with the Kuriharas. When Satoko and Kiyokazu come to pick up their newborn son, they are asked if they want to meet his biological mother. They agree, and are introduced to Hikari, who cares deeply for her son. Before parting ways, Hikari gives her son's adoptive parents a letter addressed to Asato, apologizing for leaving him.

In the years following the adoption, Satoko and Kiyokazu are happy to have Asato (Reo Sato) in their lives, while Hikari feels out of place after leaving Baby Baton. Hikari soon leaves home and returns to Baby Baton, asking for a job and a place to stay. She learns that Baby Baton will be closing down after its final current resident gives birth. While working there, Hikari accidentally comes upon Baby Baton's records of adoptive parents, and finds the file about the Kuriharas. Hikari then moves closer to the city to be nearer to her son and takes a job delivering newspapers. While working one day, Hikari befriends a young girl her own age and who reminds her of one of the pregnant women she met at Baby Baton. The two soon become friends; however, Hikari's friend is in trouble with loan sharks and forges Hikari's signature as a co-signer to avoid repaying the debt.

One day, the Kuriharas receive a call from one of Asato's kindergarten teachers, telling them that a boy at his school has fallen off the jungle gym and claims Asato pushed him, an allegation Asato denies. The boy's mother has requested reimbursement for their medical expenses. Satoko worries that her son may have inherited bad genes from his birth parents.

Later, Satoko receives another phone call from the kindergarten teacher, revealing that the other boy lied about Asato pushing him and confessed that he jumped off the jungle gym himself. Satoko feels relieved, and the family plans a joyful visit to the zoo, but they are interrupted by a phone call from Shizue Asami (Miyoko Asada), a woman impersonating Hikari and demanding she wants her son back. Satoko and Kiyokazu reluctantly agree to meet 'Hikari', who threatens to reveal their son is adopted unless they give her money. The Kuriharas, however, reveal that their son's adoption is not a secret and based on what Shizue has said and their only meeting the real Hikari, they do not believe she is Asato's birth mother.

Meanwhile the actual Hikari eventually comes up with the money to pay the loan sharks and reaches out to her son's adoptive parents. After hearing Asato calling for his adoptive mother, she apologizes and says she is not his birth mother and runs away.

Later on, Sakoto is visited by the police who show her Hikari's name and confirm her identity. Ashamed of not having recognized Hikari, Sakoto manages to track her down and introduces her adopted son to his birth mother.

== Cast ==
- Hiromi Nagasaku as Satoko Kurihara
- Arata Iura as Kiyokazu Kurihara
- Aju Makita as Hikari Katakura
- Reo Satō as Asato Kurihara
- Miyoko Asada as Shizue Asami
- Taketo Tanaka as Takumi Asō
- Hiroko Nakajima as Hikari's mother
- Tetsu Hirahara as Hikari's father
- Ren Komai as Hikari's sister
- Rio Yamashita
- Kokoro Morita
- Masami Horiuchi
- Hiroshi Yamamoto
- Msaki Miura
- Shōko Ikezu
- Ryuya Wakaba
- Munetaka Aoki
- Gō Rijū

== Reception ==
Review aggregator Rotten Tomatoes gives the film a 91% approval rating based on 43 reviews, with an average rating of 6.9/10. The site's critical consensus reads, "True Mothers uses an intractable conflict to explore the bonds of parenthood with director/co-writer Naomi Kawase's usual sensitivity and grace." Metacritic assigned the film a weighted average score of 64 out of 100, based on 11 critics, indicating "generally favourable reviews".

== Controversy ==
In April 2022, Shūkan Bunshun reported that Kawase physically assaulted a camera assistant while filming True Mothers in May 2019, leading cinematographer Yūta Tsukinaga and his team to resign mid-production. Kawase did not deny the allegation.

== See also ==
- Cinema of Japan
- List of submissions to the 93rd Academy Awards for Best International Feature Film
- List of Japanese submissions for the Academy Award for Best International Feature Film
