= Eriko Sato =

Japanese actress (born 1981)

- Born: December 19, 1981 (age 44); Sapporo, Hokkaido, Japan
- Occupation: Actress
- Years active: 1998–present
- Spouse: unknown (m. 2015)
- Children: 1
- Modeling information
- Height: 1.73 m (5 ft 8 in)

Eriko Sato (佐藤 江梨子, Satō Eriko; born 19 December 1981) is a Japanese actress. She is also a former gravure idol and made her debut in 1998.

== Early life ==
Sato was born in Sapporo, Hokkaido, and raised in Tokyo.

== Career ==
Sato starred in Hideaki Anno's 2004 comedy film Cutie Honey and Kōji Shiraishi's 2007 horror film Carved.

She has also appeared in films such as Daihachi Yoshida's 2007 black comedy film Funuke Show Some Love, You Losers!, Kazuya Konaka's 2010 science fiction film Nanase Futatabi and Junji Sakamoto's 2010 mystery film Strangers in the City.

She co-starred in Tsuyoshi Inoue's 2010 drama film The Town's Children with Mirai Moriyama.

== Filmography ==
=== Film ===
- Samurai Girl 21 (2002)
- Cutie Honey (2004)
- Sinking of Japan (2006)
- Silver Season (2007)
- Carved (2007)
- Funuke Show Some Love, You Losers! (2007)
- Aki Fukaki (2008)
- The Setting Sun (2009)
- Goemon (2009), Yoshino Dayu
- All to the Sea (2010)
- Nanase Futatabi (2010)
- Strangers in the City (2010)
- The Town's Children (2010)
- Night People (2013)
- R100 (2013)
- Ringside Story (2017)
- Laplace's Witch (2018)
- Diner (2019)
- Fancy (2020)
- Midnight Swan (2020)
- Kisaragi Station (2022)
- Break in the Clouds (2022), Ageha
- Re: Kisaragi Station (2025)

=== Television ===
- Churasan (2001)
- The Queen of Lunchtime Cuisine (2002)
- Kaidan Hyaku Monogatari (2002)
- Orange Days (2004)
- Tokyo Wankei (2004)
- Densha Otoko (2005)
- Koi ni Ochitara (2005)
- Densha Otoko DX: Saigo no Seizen (2006)
- CA to Oyobi! (2006)
- Shin Ningen Kosaten (2006)
- Sengoku Jietai: Sekigahara no Tatakai (2006)
- Tenka Souran: Tokugawa Sandai no Inbo (2006)
- Kikujiro to Saki (2007)
- Yamato Nadeshiko Shichi Henge (2010)
- Welcome to the El-Palacio (2011)
- Koi Suru Nihongo (2012)
- Boys on the Run (2012)
- Last Hope (2013)
- Magical x Heroine MagimajoPures (2018)
- Half Blue Sky (2018)
- Ultraman Arc (2024)

== Awards ==
2008: 29th Yokohama Film Festival – Best Actress
