= After the Storm (2016 film) =

- Theatrical release poster
- Kanji: 海よりもまだ深く
- Directed by: Hirokazu Kore-eda
- Written by: Hirokazu Kore-eda
- Produced by: Kaoru Matsuzaki; Akihiko Yose; Hijiri Taguchi
- Starring: Hiroshi Abe; Kirin Kiki; Yōko Maki
- Cinematography: Yutaka Yamasaki
- Edited by: Hirokazu Kore-eda
- Music by: Hanaregumi
- Production companies: Fuji Television; Bandai Visual; Aoi Pro. Gaga
- Distributed by: Gaga
- Release dates: May 18, 2016 (Cannes); May 21, 2016 (Japan)
- Running time: 117 minutes
- Country: Japan
- Language: Japanese
- Box office: $5.3 million

After the Storm (海よりもまだ深く, Umi yori mo Mada Fukaku; "Even Deeper than the Sea") is a 2016 Japanese family drama film written, directed and edited by Hirokazu Kore-eda. It was screened in the Un Certain Regard section at the 2016 Cannes Film Festival and was released in Japan on May 21, 2016. The film received acclaim from critics.

== Plot ==
Dwelling on his past glory as a minor prize-winning author from a single novel, Ryota (Hiroshi Abe) wastes any money he makes as a private detective on gambling and can barely make ends meet or pay child support for his son. He makes extra money by offering his own services to the detective agency's clients or blackmailing them. Though he is offered a contract to write for a manga series with an upcoming artist, his personal pride prevents him.

After the death of his father, his aging mother Yoshiko (Kirin Kiki) seems to be moving on with her life with hobbies with the local elderly ladies. Ryota finds his sister Chinatsu is visiting their mother frequently and suspects she is trying to sponge off her; he later learns their mother is to fund his sister's daughter's new figure skating lessons from her social pension. His sister in turn suspects Ryota's visits are for getting money from their mother and recounts an old hiding place where their mother successfully hid money from their gambler father. When Ryota checks it later he is pleased to find what he thinks is cash, only to unwrap cardboard and a note to him from his sister.

Ryota is trying to get back with his ex-wife Kyoko (Yoko Maki), who has grown tired of Ryota's excuses for his continual failure to pay child support, and threatens to stop letting him spend time with their young son, Shingo (Taiyo Yoshizawa). Ryota is aware that Kyoko has a new boyfriend and fears her remarriage would end his relationship with Shingo. During a stormy summer night, sheltering from the typhoon with his family at his mother's home, his ex-wife says it is truly over with them and grown-ups cannot live only with love; planning is required as well and Ryota isn't cut out to be a family man – if he were, he would have behaved as one earlier. Ryota understands and attempts to take back control of his existence and to find a lasting place in Shingo's life. He uses the storm as a chance to bond with his son by repeating a memorable experience he once had with his father, sheltering in a local playground as the storm rages.

The next morning, they resume their lives.

== Cast ==
- Hiroshi Abe as Ryota Shinoda
- Yōko Maki as Kyoko Shiraishi
- Taiyō Yoshizawa as Shingo Shiraishi
- Kirin Kiki as Yoshiko Shinoda
- Satomi Kobayashi as Chinatsu Shinoda
- Sosuke Ikematsu
- Kazuya Takahashi
- Aju Makita
- Lily Franky
- Isao Hashizume

== Production ==
Kore-eda conceived of the film in 2001 when he visited his mother, who had been living alone in a housing complex after his father's death. He started writing the screenplay in the summer of 2013. Filming began in May 2014 and lasted a month and a half, in between the production of Our Little Sister, which was shot throughout a year.

== Reception ==
=== Box office ===
On its opening weekend at the Japanese box office, After the Storm was placed fifth, with 89,510 admissions.

=== Critical response ===
On review aggregator Rotten Tomatoes, the film holds a 96% approval rating on based on 138 reviews, with an average rating of 8/10. The site's critical consensus reads, "After the Storm crosses cultural lines to offer timeless observations about parental responsibilities, personal bonds, and the capacity for forgiveness." It also holds an 84/100 on Metacritic. Calling the film "a classic Japanese family drama of gentle persuasion and staggering simplicity", which is "beautifully balanced between gentle comedy and the melancholy reality of how people really are," Deborah Young of The Hollywood Reporter suggests the film is about how "you can’t always have the life you want, or be who you want to be".

== Accolades ==
Year	Award ceremony	Category	Recipient	Result	citations
2016	29th Nikkan Sports Film Award	Best Film		Nominated	
2016	69th Cannes Film Festival	Un Certain Regard	Hirokazu Kore-eda	Nominated	
2016	Chicago International Film Festival	Best Feature (Gold Hugo)	Hirokazu Kore-eda	Nominated	
2017	11th Asian Film Awards	Best Cinematographer	Yutaka Yamasaki	Nominated	
