= Funuke Show Some Love, You Losers! =

- Directed by: Daihachi Yoshida
- Based on: Funuke domo kanashimi no ai o misero by Yukiko Motoya
- Starring: Eriko Sato; Masatoshi Nagase; Hiromi Nagasaku
- Release date: July 7, 2007
- Country: Japan
- Language: Japanese

Funuke Show Some Love, You Losers! (腑抜けども、悲しみの愛を見せろ, Funuke domo, kanashimi no ai wo misero; lit "Cowards, show some sorrowful love!") is a 2007 Japanese film directed by Daihachi Yoshida, based on the novel by Yukiko Motoya.

== Awards ==
32nd Hochi Film Awards

- Best Supporting Actress - Hiromi Nagasaku

29th Yokohama Film Festival

- Best Actress - Eriko Sato
- Best Supporting Actor - Masatoshi Nagase
- Best Supporting Actress - Hiromi Nagasaku
- Best New Director - Daihachi Yoshida
- Best Cinematography
- 4th Best Film
