= Hiromi Nagasaku =

Japanese actress and singer (born 1970)

- Born: Namegata, Ibaraki, Japan
- Occupations: Actress; singer
- Years active: 1989–present

Hiromi Nagasaku (永作 博美, Nagasaku Hiromi) is a Japanese actress and singer. She was a member of the J-pop group Ribbon. Mark Schilling of The Japan Times described her as "the best comic actress working in Japan today".

== Career ==
Nagasaku appeared in Kiyoshi Kurosawa's 2003 film Doppelganger.

She played a supporting role in the 2007 film Funuke Show Some Love, You Losers!, for which she won the awards for Best Supporting Actress at the 32nd Hochi Film Awards and the Kinema Junpo magazine.

She won the Best Supporting Actress award for Rebirth at the 35th Japan Academy Prize in 2012.

== Filmography ==
=== Film ===
- Doppelganger (2003)
- Hanging Garden (2005)
- Su-ki-da (2005)
- Funuke Show Some Love, You Losers! (2007)
- Dolphin Blue (2007)
- Closed Note (2007)
- Sex Is No Laughing Matter (2007)
- Dosokai (2008)
- R246 Story (2008)
- The Clone Returns Home (2009)
- Cast Me If You Can (2010), Aya
- Wandering Home (2010), Yuki Sonoda
- Rebirth (2011), Kiwako Nonomiya
- Solomon's Perjury (2015)
- The Furthest End Awaits (2015), Misaki Yoshida
- True Mothers (2020), Satoko Kurihara
- Until We Meet Again (2026), Minami Shimizu
- Finding My Punchline (2026), Mom
- Akiramemasen! (2027), Ikuko Kirishima

=== Television ===
- Kōmyō ga Tsuji (2006), Yodo-dono
- Magerarenai Onna (2010)
- Dirty Mama! (2012)
- Chinmoku Hōtei (2017)
- Mikazuki (2019), Chiaki Akasaka
- Maiagare! (2022–23), Megumi Iwakura
- Modern Love Tokyo (2022)
- Plastic Beauty (2026), Taeko Numata

=== Dubbing ===
- Where the Wild Things Are, K.W. (Lauren Ambrose)

== Discography ==
=== Albums ===
- N (1993)
- Here and Now (1994)

=== Singles ===
- "My Home Town" (1993)
- "Without You" (1994)
- "Ai ni Kite" (1994)
- "9:01 pm" (1998)
