= Tora-san, My Uncle =

- Theatrical poster
- Directed by: Yoji Yamada
- Written by: Yoji Yamada; Yoshitaka Asama
- Produced by: Kiyoshi Shimizu
- Starring: Kiyoshi Atsumi; Kumiko Goto
- Cinematography: Tetsuo Takaba
- Edited by: Iwao Ishii
- Music by: Naozumi Yamamoto
- Distributed by: Shochiku
- Release date: December 27, 1989
- Running time: 108 minutes
- Country: Japan
- Language: Japanese

Tora-san, My Uncle (男はつらいよ ぼくの伯父さん, Otoko wa Tsurai yo: Boku no Ojisan) is a 1989 Japanese comedy film directed by Yoji Yamada. It stars Kiyoshi Atsumi as Torajirō Kuruma (Tora-san), and Kumiko Goto as his nephew's love interest or "Madonna". Tora-san, My Uncle is the 42nd entry in the popular, long-running Otoko wa Tsurai yo series.

== Cast ==
- Kiyoshi Atsumi as Torajirō
- Chieko Baisho as Sakura
- Fumi Dan as Hisako
- Shimojo Masami as Kuruma Tatsuzō
- Chieko Misaki as Tsune Kuruma (Torajiro's aunt)
- Hisao Dazai as Boss (Umetarō Katsura)
- Gajirō Satō as Genkō
- Hidetaka Yoshioka as Mitsuo Suwa
- Kumiko Goto as Izumi Oikawa (Mitsuo's girlfriend)
- Gin Maeda as Hiroshi Suwa
- Chishū Ryū as Gozen-sama

== Critical appraisal ==
Hidetaka Yoshioka was nominated for Best Supporting Actor at the Japan Academy Prize for his role in Tora-san, My Uncle. He won this title at the Nikkan Sports Film Award ceremony. Kumiko Goto was nominated for Best Actress at the Japan Academy Prize. Kevin Thomas of the Los Angeles Times wrote that "This Tora-san, like all the others, in its depiction of warm family life and natural beauty, exudes a strong nostalgic pull for a Japan that was more spacious, beautiful and personal than it is today." The German-language site molodezhnaja gives Tora-san, My Uncle three and a half out of five stars.

== Availability ==
Tora-san, My Uncle was released theatrically on December 27, 1989. In Japan, the film was released on videotape in 1996, and in DVD format in 1998, 2005, and 2008.

== Bibliography ==
=== English ===
- "OTOKO WA TSURAIYO -BOKU NO OJISAN". Complete Index to World Film.
- Otoko wa tsurai yo: Boku no ojisan (1989) at IMDb

=== German ===
- "Tora-San, My Uncle" (in German). www.molodezhnaja.ch.

=== Japanese ===
- 男はつらいよ ぼくの伯父さん (1989) (in Japanese). allcinema.net.
- "男はつらいよ ぼくの伯父さん". Japanese Cinema Database (Agency for Cultural Affairs). Archived from the original on 2012-03-11.
- 男はつらいよ ぼくの伯父さん (in Japanese). Japanese Movie Database.
- 男はつらいよ ぼくの伯父さん (in Japanese). Kinema Junpo. Archived from the original on 2012-03-24.
