= List of Japanese films of 2026 =

This is a list of Japanese films that are scheduled to release in 2026.

== Highest-grossing films ==
The following is a list of the 10 highest-grossing Japanese films released at the Japanese box office during 2026.
*Last updated on November 17, 2026.

Rank	Title	Gross
1	Chiikawa the Movie: The Secret of the Mermaid Island	¥18.96 billion (US$119.2 million)
2	Detective Conan: Fallen Angel of the Highway	¥13.70 billion (US$86.2 million)
3	Kingdom 5: The Clash of Souls	¥6.90 billion (US$43.4 million)
4	Until We Meet Again	¥4.70 billion (US$29.6 million)
5	Doraemon: New Nobita and the Castle of the Undersea Devil	¥4.27 billion (US$26.9 million)
6	All Our Tomorrows	¥4.14 billion (US$26.0 million)
7	Godzilla Minus Zero	¥4.05 billion (US$25.5 million)
8	Cosmic Princess Kaguya!	¥3.60 billion (US$22.6 million)
9	Bayside Shakedown N.E.W.	¥3.52 billion (US$22.1 million)
10	Crayon Shin-chan the Movie: Spooky! My Yokai Vacation	¥2.90 billion (US$18.2 million)

== Released ==
=== January – March ===
Opening		Title	Director	Cast	Ref.
J A N U A R Y	1	Labyrinth	Shōji Kawamori	Suzuka, Taizo Harada, Aoi Ito, Jun Saitō, Show Hayami, Maaya Sakamoto, Tomokazu Sugita, Takuto Teranishi	
J A N U A R Y	1	Kyojo: Reunion	Isamu Nakae	Takuya Kimura, Keito Tsuna, Kyōko Saitō, Daichi Kaneko, Yuki Kura, Hiroe Igeta, Karen Otomo, Yuno Ohara, Shori Sato, Aoi Nakamura, Fumiyo Kohinata	
J A N U A R Y	9	Our Journey for 50 Years	Masatoshi Nakamura	Masatoshi Nakamura, Taisaku Akino, Ken Tanaka, Aki Maeda, Kaho Mizutani, Tokie Hidari, Seiji Fukushi, Nana Okada	
J A N U A R Y	9	The Imaginary Dog and the Lying Cat	Yukihiro Morigaki	Mahiro Takasugi, Marika Itō, Mai Fukagawa, Yuko Ando, Yuka Kouri, Hiccorohee, Ken Yasuda, Kimiko Yo, Akira Emoto	
J A N U A R Y	9	All You Need Is Kill	Ken'ichiro Akimoto	Ai Mikami, Natsuki Hanae, Kana Hanazawa, Hiccorohee, Mo Chugakusei	
J A N U A R Y	10	Mr. Hoshino Runs Again Today	Yuta Soma	Miyazon, Sakurako Ohara, Masahiro Inoue, Mayu Ozawa, Shugo, Akari Miura, Haruhi Yamaguchi	
J A N U A R Y	16	All Greens	Takashi Koyama	Sara Minami, Natsuki Deguchi, Mizuki Yoshida, Jinsei Hamura, Kodai Kurosaki, Daichi Kaneko	
J A N U A R Y	16	Captured!	Kouichi	Runa Nakashima, Maikichi, Masanari Wada, Mao Miyaji, Megumi Okina	
J A N U A R Y	16	The Curse	Kenichi Ugana	Yukino Kaizu, Yu, Mimi Shao, Shiho, Ray Fan, Tammy Lin, Hironobu Nomura, Yasukaze Motomiya	
J A N U A R Y	22	Cosmic Princess Kaguya!	Shingo Yamashita	Yūko Natsuyoshi, Anna Nagase, Saori Hayami	
J A N U A R Y	23	Love on Trial	Koji Fukada	Kyōko Saitō, Yuki Kura, Erika Karata, Kenjiro Tsuda	
J A N U A R Y	23	Black Ox	Tetsuichirō Tsuta	Lee Kang-sheng, Min Tanaka	
J A N U A R Y	23	The Girl at the End of the Line	Kōta Yoshida	Ami Touma, Sena Nakajima, Kokoro Hirasawa, Kotona Minami, Taisuke Niihara, Sakurako Konishi, Masumi Nomura, Kowa Jinno, Mai Fukagawa, Hikari Ishida	
J A N U A R Y	23	A Place Called Home	Renpei Tsukamoto	Airi Suzuki, Mana Kawaguchi, Ayumi Ito, Nene Otsuka	
J A N U A R Y	23	Higuma!! The Killer Bear	Eisuke Naito	Fuku Suzuki, Wan Marui, Takashi Ukaji, Joey Iwanaga, Yu Uemura	
J A N U A R Y	30	The Keeper of the Camphor Tree	Tomohiko Itō	Fumiya Takahashi, Yūki Amami, Asuka Saitō, Ryubi Miyase, Takao Osawa	
J A N U A R Y	30	Mobile Suit Gundam: Hathaway – The Sorcery of Nymph Circe	Shūkō Murase	Kensho Ono, Reina Ueda, Junichi Suwabe, Soma Saito, Shunsuke Takeuchi, Saori Hayami, Kenjiro Tsuda	
J A N U A R Y	30	Girls und Panzer: Motto Love Love Sakusen Desu! – Act 2	Masami Shimoda	Mai Fuchigami, Ai Kayano, Mami Ozaki, Ikumi Nakagami, Yuka Iguchi	
F E B R U A R Y	6	Until We Meet Again	Takahiro Miki	Minami Hamabe, Ren Meguro, Misato Morita, Ken Mitsuishi, Mirai Shida, Keisuke Watanabe, Maho Nonami, Taizo Harada, Sho Nishigaki, Shiori Kubo, Kotone Furukawa, Takumi Kitamura, Yuko Araki	
F E B R U A R Y	6	Mag Mag	Yuriyan Retriever	Sara Minami, Oshiro Maeda, Aoi Yamada, Akari Takaishi, Jo Kujo, Fuku Suzuki, Mizuki Maehara, Atsuko Hirata, Tetsu Hirahara, Takumi Saitoh, Rena Tanaka	
F E B R U A R Y	6	Yakushima's Illusion	Naomi Kawase	Vicky Krieps, Kanichiro, Machiko Ono, Kazuki Kitamura, Masatoshi Nagase, Hijiri Kojima, Rei Okamoto, Gō Rijū, Tomoko Nakajima	
F E B R U A R Y	6	Aoike Haruka no Jiken Channel	Tsukasa Shirakawa	Yuko Natori, Tomochika, Toru Kazama, Ryō Katō, Tomiyuki Kunihiro, Sinobu Nakayama, Chizuru Azuma, Maki Mizuno	
F E B R U A R Y	10	This Is I	Yusaku Matsumoto	Haruki Mochizuki, Takumi Saitoh, Tae Kimura, Seiji Chihara, Ataru Nakamura, Kaito Yoshimura, Megumi, Nakamura Shidō II	
F E B R U A R Y	13	Love Punch!	Fuga Yaegashi	Jyutaro Yamanaka, Aloha Takamatsu, Haruto Shiratori, Shoma Arashi, Shunya Asano, Daichi Kodaira, Rio Takahashi, Yu Miyawaki	
F E B R U A R Y	13	I Fell in Love with a Z-Grade Director in Brooklyn	Ken'ichi Ugana	Ui Mihara, Estevan Muñoz, Katsunari Nakagawa, Larry Fessenden, Madeline Barbush	
F E B R U A R Y	20	Kyojo: Requiem	Isamu Nakae	Takuya Kimura, Keito Tsuna, Kyōko Saitō, Daichi Kaneko, Yuki Kura, Hiroe Igeta, Karen Otomo, Yuno Ohara, Shori Sato, Aoi Nakamura, Fumiyo Kohinata	
F E B R U A R Y	20	The Convenience Store	Jiro Nagae	Kotona Minami, Terunosuke Takezai, Tetta Seki, Shunsuke Tanaka, Takeo Gozu, Makoto Sakamoto, Mai Tezuka, Yuki Yoshioka, Atsuko Sakurai, Natsuki Katō	
F E B R U A R Y	20	Sai: Disaster	Yutaro Seki, Kentaro Hirase	Teruyuki Kagawa, Anne Nakamura, Pistol Takehara, Sena Nakajima, Ryuhei Matsuda, Chika Uchida, Kisetsu Fujiwara, Jiro, Maki Sakai, Yumi Adachi, Kai Inowaki	
F E B R U A R Y	27	That Time I Got Reincarnated as a Slime the Movie: Tears of the Azure Sea	Yasuhito Kikuchi	Miho Okasaki, Megumi Toyoguchi, Tomoaki Maeno, Makoto Furukawa, Saori Ōnishi, Kōji Yusa, Koichi Domoto	
F E B R U A R Y	27	Samurai Vengeance	Takashi Minamoto	Tasuku Emoto, Kento Nagao, Kazuki Kitamura, Kōji Seto, Kenichi Takitō, Makiya Yamaguchi, Reika Manaki, Ayako Imoto, Shūhei Nomura, Kazuya Takahashi, Bokuzō Masana, Renji Ishibashi, Yasuko Sawaguchi, Ken Watanabe	
F E B R U A R Y	27	#Spread	King Bai	Ryo Narita, Erika Sawajiri, Yasushi Fuchikami, Kasumi Yamaya, Mariko Akama, Tetsu Funagayama, Daiki, Takehisa Takayama	
F E B R U A R Y	27	Doraemon: New Nobita and the Castle of the Undersea Devil	Tetsuo Yajima	Wasabi Mizuta, Megumi Ōhara, Yumi Kakazu, Subaru Kimura, Tomokazu Seki	
F E B R U A R Y	27	Coffee After All	Jun Hosoi	Sakura Fujiwara, Jun Hosoi, Tatsuya Yamawaki, Ryohei Higashino, Nanami Hidaka, Riko Seto, Ryuji Tanigawa, Hayato Isomura, Yoshinori Okada, Tokio Emoto	
F E B R U A R Y	28	Kaneko Fumiko: Because I Wanted to	Sachi Hamano	Nahana, Katsuya Kobayashi, Masaki Miura, Yoriko Dōguchi, Kazuko Shirakawa, Shun Sugata, Kazuko Yoshiyuki	
M A R C H	6	A New Dawn	Yoshitoshi Shinomiya	Riku Hagiwara, Kotone Furukawa, Miyu Irino, Takashi Okabe	
M A R C H	6	Girls und Panzer: Motto Love Love Sakusen Desu! – Act 3	Masami Shimoda	Mai Fuchigami, Ai Kayano, Mami Ozaki, Ikumi Nakagami, Yuka Iguchi	
M A R C H	6	Service Oath	Yuji Kakizaki	Yasuyuki Maekawa, Yuka Takeshima, Masaya Kikawada, Masayuki Deai, Kenji Mizuhashi, Yuichi Haba, Asahi Uchida, Takuro Tatsumi, Satoshi Tokushige, Yasuo Daichi	
M A R C H	13	Samurai Ballerina: L'étoile de Paris en Fleur	Gorō Taniguchi	Ami Touma, Lina Arashi, Taichi Saotome, Mugi Kadowaki, Onoe Matsuya II, Akihiro Kakuta, Kenjiro Tsuda, Yoshiko Sakakibara, Akio Otsuka	
M A R C H	13	Golden Kamuy: The Abashiri Prison Raid	Kenji Katagiri	Kento Yamazaki, Anna Yamada, Gordon Maeda, Yūma Yamoto, Asuka Kudo, Shuntarō Yanagi, Akihisa Shiono, Yu Inaba, Ryohei Otani, Maryjun Takahashi, Yuki Sakurai, Katsuya, Taishi Nakagawa, Kazuki Kitamura, Hiroyuki Ikeuchi, Katsumi Kiba, Tetta Sugimoto, Jun Kunimura, Arata Iura, Hiroshi Tamaki, Hiroshi Tachi	
M A R C H	13	The Specials	Eiji Uchida	Daisuke Sakuma, Kippei Shiina, Yuta Nakamoto, Sho Aoyagi, Hitoshi Ozawa	
M A R C H	20	The Last Song You Left Behind	Takahiro Miki	Shunsuke Michieda, Meru Nukumi, Sora Inoue, Momoko Tanabe, Pistol Takehara, Koki Okada, Takeo Gozu, Toru Nomaguchi, Shinji Nira, Yoshiko Miyazaki, Masato Hagiwara	
M A R C H	20	Tokyo Strayers	Ren Akiba	Rio Teramoto, Akana Ikeda, Keito Tsuna, Nao Takahashi	
M A R C H	27	Chimney Town: Frozen in Time	Yusuke Hirota	Yuzuna Nagase, Masataka Kubota, Megumi, Fuka Koshiba, Mitsuo Yoshihara, Anna Tsuchiya, Koichi Yamadera, Shingo Fujimori, Sairi Ito, Koji Higashino, Masanori Hasegawa, Takashi Watanabe, Showtaro Morikubo	
M A R C H	27	90 Meters	Shun Nakagawa	Soma Santoki, Miho Kanno, Kotona Minami, Taketo Tanaka, Nanase Nishino	
M A R C H	27	Street Kingdom	Tomorowo Taguchi	Kazunobu Mineta, Ryuya Wakaba, Riho Yoshioka, Taiga Nakano, Shotaro Mamiya, Sena Nakajima, Nao Ōmori, Nakamura Shidō II	
M A R C H	27	The Ogre's Bride	Chihiro Ikeda	Ren Nagase, Ai Yoshikawa, Kentaro Ito, Rin Kataoka, Katsumi Hyodo, Ayana Shiramoto, Momoko Tanabe, Nanato Tanihara, Kyusaku Shimada, Machiko Ono	
M A R C H	28	The Busiest Actor on Earth	Takayuki Kayano	Kanji Tsuda, Yuri Hirasawa, Ryu Ichinose, Ryo Shinoda, Hiromi Iwasaki, Tetsu Watanabe	

=== April – June ===
Opening		Title	Director	Cast	Ref.
A P R I L	3	How to Steal the Gold	Takayuki Kayano	Rena Tanaka, Win Morisaki, Taigi Asuwa, Ren Ishikawa, Kenji Iwaya, Yumiko Nakamura, Hiroshi Katsuno, Yoshiko Miyazaki	
A P R I L	3	Zakken!: The Cosmos Beneath Our Feet	Naho Kamimura	Runa Nakashima, Miyu Oshima, Ryosuke Yagami, Cocoro Toyoshima, Yuna Nakamura, Ayumu Nakajima, Nobuyuki Tsuchiya, Yuka Itaya, Nobuto Okamoto	
A P R I L	10	Girls und Panzer: Motto Love Love Sakusen Desu! – Act 4	Masami Shimoda	Mai Fuchigami, Ai Kayano, Mami Ozaki, Ikumi Nakagami, Yuka Iguchi	
A P R I L	10	Detective Conan: Fallen Angel of the Highway	Takahiro Hasui	Minami Takayama, Wakana Yamazaki, Rikiya Koyama, Miyuki Sawashiro, Shin-ichiro Miki, Nobutoshi Canna, Mei Hata, Ryusei Yokohama	
A P R I L	10	Burn	Makoto Nagahisa	Nana Mori, Aoi Yamada, Ryōsuke Sota, Wataru Ichinose, Reona Hirota, Chise Niitsu, Mei Takahashi, Nao Matsuzaki, Kanji Furutachi	
A P R I L	10	Sunekosuri no Mori	Kazutaka Watanabe	Issey Takahashi, Nico Aoto, Kodai Kurosaki	
A P R I L	17	One Last Love Letter	Yuya Ishii	Haruka Ayase, Ami Touma, Kanata Hosoda, Takuma Otoo, Miu Tomita, Airi Nishikawa, Hideyuki Kasahara, Kanji Tsuda, Hideko Hara, Satoshi Tsumabuki, Masaki Suda, Kōichi Satō	
A P R I L	24	Tsuki no Inu	Takeshi Yokoi	Masato Hagiwara, Tomoka Kurotani, Motoki Fukami, Soraji Shibuya, Susumu Terajima, Hideko Hara, Kyosuke Yabe, Eriko Nakamura, Suzuka Ohgo	
A P R I L	24	Piccola Felicità	Yutaka Mizutani	Yutaka Mizutani, Nobue Iketani, Nahana, Gamon Kaai, Shuri, Atsushi Hashimoto	
A P R I L	29	Sakamoto Days	Yuichi Fukuda	Ren Meguro, Fumiya Takahashi, Aya Ueto, Miyu Yoshimoto, Mayuu Yokota, Junki Tozuka, Takumi Kitamura, Yusei Yagi, Meru Nukumi	
A P R I L	29	Agito	Ryuta Tasaki	Jun Kaname, Yuna Kogawa, Toshiki Kashû, Touko Fujita, Jun Yamasaki, Akiyoshi Shibata, Takeshi Masu, Rina Akiyama, Ryusuke Komakine, Yuki Imai, Hiroaki Iwanaga, Suzunosuke Tanaka, Kokoro Aoshima, Satoishi Kanada, Tokimasa Tanabe, Becky, Takanori Higuchi	
M A Y	1	Rhapsody, Rhapsody	Gō Rijū	Issey Takahashi, Kumi Kureshiro, Gō Rijū, Tateto Serizawa, Hisako Okata, Kazuyuki Sekiguchi, Chizuru Ikewaki	
M A Y	8	Kyoto Hippocrates	Akira Ogata	Kuranosuke Sasaki, Kisetsu Fujiwara, Ryōko Fujino, Yōko Maki, Akira Emoto, Takashi Naito	
M A Y	8	Cry Out	Takahisa Zeze	Yuina Kuroshima, Nanami Yamazaki, Ryota Bando, Kanata Hosoda, Hana Kondo, Reo Tamaoki, Shiori Nozawa, Mitsuru Fukikoshi, Ichirōta Miyagawa, Nanase Nishino, Tori Matsuzaka, Keiko Kitagawa	
M A Y	15	The Honest Realtor: The Movie	Taisuke Kawamura	Tomohisa Yamashita, Haruka Fukuhara, Hayato Ichihara, Rika Izumi, Shinobu Hasegawa, Ai Mikami, Wakana Matsumoto, Dean Fujioka, Mao Daichi, Kana Kurashina, Katsunori Takahashi, Masao Kusakari	
M A Y	15	Patlabor EZY: File 1	Yutaka Izubuchi	Sumire Uesaka, Kikunosuke Toya, Ami Koshimizu, Chikahiro Kobayashi, Setsuji Satō, Yume Matsumura, Shigeru Chiba, Megumi Hayashibara	
M A Y	15	Your Own Quiz	Kohei Yoshino	Tomoya Nakamura, Ryunosuke Kamiki, Tsuyoshi Muro, Aoi Morikawa, Rintaro Mizusawa, Jyubun Fukuzawa, Yoshizumi, Takumi Bando, Mizuho Shiromiya, Riku Onishi, Yūsuke Santamaria, Mayu Hotta	
M A Y	15	The A-Care: Disusebody	Kohki Yoshida	Shota Sometani, Yukiya Kitamura, Kumi Takiuchi, Hiromasa Hirosue, Eriko Nakamura, Tomo Nakai, Mutsuo Yoshioka, Naomasa Musaka	
M A Y	15	Erica	Taro Miyaoka	Ayumu Mochizuki, Meari Hayashi, Hayato Takao, Kurea Hazuki, Moeka Koizumi, Itsuki Fujiwara	
M A Y	15	Transit in Flamingo	Yuki Horiuchi	Rio Yamashita, Gaku Hosokawa, Kilala Inori, Masaki Miura, Ryuzo Tanaka, Kotone Furukawa	
M A Y	22	Mystery Arena	Yukihiko Tsutsumi	Toshiaki Karasawa, Mana Ashida, Tōko Miura, Nobuyuki Suzuki, Reina Triendl, So Okuno, Shohei Uno, Toru Nomaguchi, Tetsuji Tamayama, Yūko Asano	
M A Y	22	Nameless	Hideo Jojo	Jiro Sato, Ryuhei Maruyama, Megumi, Kuranosuke Sasaki	
M A Y	22	Iroha	Hatsuki Yokoo	Ririka Kawashima, Kokoro Morita, Mayu Tsuruta, Kumiko Endo, Daichi Kaneko, Kenshin Endo	
M A Y	25	Chaser Game W: A Match Made in Heaven	Yu Ota	Yūka Sugai, Yurika Nakamura, Miku Okamoto, Tomoka Kurotani, Ayumi Ito	
M A Y	29	Goodbye, My Loved Ones!	Hideyuki Katsuki	Atsuko Takahata, Ayame Goriki, Yuki Matsushita, Masaru Mizuno, Masahiko Nishimura, Fumiyo Kohinata, Yoshiko Mita, Isao Hashizume	
M A Y	29	Mononoke the Movie: Chapter III - The Curse of the Serpent	TBA	Hiroshi Kamiya, Atsumi Tanezaki, Miyu Irino, Kenjiro Tsuda, Yoshiko Sakakibara, Tomoyo Kurosawa, Yoko Hikasa, Haruka Tomatsu, Fumi Hirano, Mariko Honda, Miyuki Sawashiro	
M A Y	29	Sheep in the Box	Hirokazu Kore-eda	Haruka Ayase, Daigo, Rimu Kuwaki, Nana Seino, Kanichiro, Hinata Hiiragi, Akihiro Kakuta, Kayo Noro, Mari Hoshino, Ayumu Nakajima, Kimiko Yo, Min Tanaka	
M A Y	29	Ninja Wars: Blackfox vs. Shogun's Ninja	Koichi Sakamoto	Chihiro Yamamoto, Kanon Miyahara, Nashiko Momotsuki, Fumi Taniguchi, Tatsuomi Hamada, Kane Kosugi, Miki Mizuno, Yasuaki Kurata	
M A Y	29	Tokyo Burst: Crime City	Eiji Uchida	Koshi Mizukami, Yunho, Kiyohiko Shibukawa, Hiccorohee, Makoto Hasegawa, Haruhi Iuchi, Tonikaku Akarui Yasumura, Park Ji-hwan, Shingo Tsurumi, Pierre Taki, Um Ki-joon, Sota Fukushi	
J U N E	5	Yamaguchi-kun Isn't So Bad	Kentaro Moriya	Kyohei Takahashi, Hikaru Takahashi, Yoji Iwase, Juri Kosaka, Amane Uehara, Hinami Mori, Jotaro, Moka Otsuka, Eri Fuse	
J U N E	5	Never After Dark	Dave Boyle	Moeka Hoshi, Kurumi Inagaki, Kento Kaku, Mutsuo Yoshioka, Bokuzō Masana, Tae Kimura	
J U N E	5	A Side Character's Love Story	Hiroki Kazama	Hiyori Sakurada, Taisei Kido, Ikoi Hayase, Erika Karata, Takuya Kusakawa, Towa Aaraki, Yūko Nakamura, Kanji Furutachi	
J U N E	5	Fujiko	Taichi Kimura	Yuki Katayama, You, Lily Franky, Tsuyoshi Ujiki, Keiko Takeshita, Issey Ogata, Kayoko Kishimoto	
J U N E	12	Mr. Osomatsu: Project Slackers	Taisuke Kawamura	Seiya Suezawa, Yoshinori Masakado, Masaya Sano, Keita Richard Kusama, Ken Kojima, Takuya Nishimura, Miho Watanabe, Yusuke Onuki, Naenano, Iori Noguchi, Hiroki Miyake, Tae Kimura	
J U N E	12	New Group	Yuta Shimotsu	Anna Yamada, Yuzu Aoki, Pierre Taki, Ren Komai, Takashi Shimizu	
J U N E	12	Memorizu	Miiku Sakanishi	Tasuku Emoto, Moeka Hoshi, Masayo Umezawa, Hiroko Isayama, Yusuke Narita, Fusako Urabe, Yuu Kashii, Issey Ogata	
J U N E	12	The Key	Shinji Imaoka	Mitsuru Fukikoshi, Kei Kanno, Keisuke Koide	
J U N E	12	The Mountain	Shingo Takeda	Ai Hashimoto, Ren Ishikawa, Sayu Kubota, Takuya Kusakawa, Yuya Matsuura, Gō Rijū	
J U N E	19	Goodbye My Car	Hayato Kawai	Hiroshi Tachi, Nanase Nishino, Sōya Kurokawa, Mao Daichi, Miki Maya, Yoko Minamino, Megumi, Norito Yashima, Kōtarō Yoshida, Ryudo Uzaki	
J U N E	19	Magical Secret Tour	Chihiro Amano	Kasumi Arimura, Haru Kuroki, Sara Minami, Akihisa Shiono, Yuzu Aoki, Hayato Kurihara, Yukiko Shinohara, Hiroko Nakajima, Rie Minemura, Shirō Sano, Takumi Saitoh	
J U N E	19	You Are the Film	Makoto Ueda	Marika Itō, Kai Inowaki, Gota Ishida, Shintaro Kanamaru, Yoshifumi Sakai, Takashi Sumita, Masashi Suwa, Kazunari Tosa, Munenori Nagata, Riko Fujitani	
J U N E	19	The Samurai and the Prisoner	Kiyoshi Kurosawa	Masahiro Motoki, Masaki Suda, Yuriko Yoshitaka, Munetaka Aoki, Ryota Miyadate, Ikkei Watanabe, Tasuku Emoto, Joe Odagiri	
J U N E	19	All of a Sudden	Ryusuke Hamaguchi	Virginie Efira, Tao Okamoto, Kyōzō Nagatsuka, Kodai Kurosaki	
J U N E	19	The Vacation Begins	Satoshi Kimura	Haruka Imou, Suguru Adachi, Yuki Araho, Yudai Yamaguchi, Ryo Igarashi, Yua Shiraishi, Kayo Qmoto, Genki Furugen, Mado Karasumori, Nagi Murata	
J U N E	26	Anpanman: Pantan to Yakusoku no Hoshi	Hiroyuki Yano	Keiko Toda, Ryūsei Nakao, Tao Tsuchiya, Rintarō, Daiki Kanechika, Kenjiro Tsuda	
J U N E	26	Unchained	Keisuke Yoshida	Wataru Ichinose, Kaho, Hayato Kohsaka, Atsushi Shinohara, Fusako Urabe, Nanami Yamazaki, Mansaku Takada, Daisuke Matsuki, Mayu Ozawa, Patrick Harlan	
J U N E	26	Sinsin and the Mouse	Yukinori Makabe	Yukino Kishii, Tseng Jing-hua, Kisetsu Fujiwara, Seina Nakata, Tokio Emoto, Kayo Ise, Kisuke Iida, Kimiko Yo	
J U N E	26	Grim Reaper Barber	Shinji Imaoka	Hinako Sakurai, Kanon, Dai Okabe, Amon Hirai, Kenta Izuka, Shohei Uno, Jun Miho	
J U N E	27	It's All Bananas!	Kenji Yamauchi	Goro Inagaki, Tsuyoshi Kusanagi, Shingo Katori, First Summer Uika, Shuri, Sara Hayama, Hibiki Mizuno, Ami Chong, Kanji Furutachi, Yukiyoshi Ozawa, Mitsuru Fukikoshi	

=== July – September ===
Opening		Title	Director	Cast	Ref.
J U L Y	3	Love≠Comedy	Kaede Kamiya	Kento Nakajima, Neru Nagahama, Yuka Itaya, Akihisa Shiono, Chikara Honda, Ken Mitsuishi, Naomi Zaizen	
J U L Y	3	Why Wait, Just Die	Junichi Kanai	Nao, Aoi Ito, Kou Maehara, Hikaru Takahashi, Takuya Kusakawa, Tomoko Tabata, Tetsu Hirahara	
J U L Y	3	Hyoketsu	Eisuke Naito	Hiromitsu Kitayama, Chihiro Kato, Aoto Yamatani, Aimi Satsukawa, Rila Fukushima, Tetsu Watanabe, Shiro Sano	
J U L Y	3	The Mouths	Takashi Shimizu	Rihito Itagaki, Keito Tsuna, Ai Yoshikawa, Momona Kasahara, Shoot Mori, Tomoki Nishiyama, Tokio Emoto, Nakamura Shidō II	
J U L Y	4	Grandma's Secret	Akiyoshi Imazaki	Alice Shimada, Keiko Takeshita, Jun Etō, Rena Hasegawa	
J U L Y	10	Trophy	Son Myona	Hanna, Chisun, Show Kasamatsu, Miwako Ichikawa, Arata Iura	
J U L Y	17	You, Fireworks, and Our Promise	Kei Suzuki	Shori Sato, Nanoka Hara, Rie Takahashi, Natsuko Yokosawa	
J U L Y	17	Kingdom 5: The Clash of Souls	Shinsuke Sato	Kento Yamazaki, Ryo Yoshizawa, Kanna Hashimoto, Jun Shison, Fūju Kamio, Kousei Yuki, Ayaka Miyoshi, Ryoki Miyama, Aju Makita, Mizuki Yamashita, Katsuya, Wataru Ichinose, Jun Kaname, Yusuke Hirayama, Bando Yajuro, Satoshi Hashimoto, Takashi Sasano, Ayumi Tanida, Aoi Nakamura, Kei Tanaka, Takumi Saitoh, Yuki Yamada, Kenji Sakaguchi, Hiroshi Tamaki, Kōichi Satō, Etsushi Toyokawa, Shun Oguri	
J U L Y	17	AnyMart	Yusuke Iwasaki	Shota Sometani, Erika Karata, Masahiko Nishimura, Kuruma Takahira	
J U L Y	17	The Living Dragon	Koichi Sakamoto, Kenji Tanigaki, Yuji Shimomura	Yasuaki Kurata, Sammo Hung, Rina Takeda, Masaya Kato, Seiji Takaiwa, Fumi Taniguchi	
J U L Y	24	Chiikawa the Movie: The Secret of the Mermaid Island	Kei Oikawa	Haruka Aoki, Masato Tanaka, Ari Ozawa, Yuka Iguchi, Takayuki Asai, Yuma Uchida, Miyuri Shimabukuro, Momo Harumi, Tsuguo Mogami, Minori Suzuki	
J U L Y	24	Sana: Play with Me	Takashi Shimizu	Suzuka Chinzei, Anna Hoshino, Riku Onishi, Rei Mukai, Mau Oguni, Hanna Muro, Shota Sometani	
J U L Y	31	Crayon Shin-chan the Movie: Spooky! My Yokai Vacation	Masaki Watanabe	Yumiko Kobayashi, Miki Narahashi, Toshiyuki Morikawa , Satomi Kōrogi, Sairi Ito, Sakamoto, Nakatani	
J U L Y	31	The Secret Battlefield	Yuya Ishii	Sosuke Ikematsu, Taiga Nakano, Takanori Iwata, Aoi Nakamura, Takahiro Miura, Rairu Sugita, Fumi Nikaido, Ryuta Sato, Yōsuke Eguchi, Jun Kunimura, Kōichi Satō	
A U G U S T	7	Blue Lock	Yusuke Taki	Fumiya Takahashi, Kaito Sakurai, Kyōhei Takahashi, Keito Tsuna, Kouta Nomura, K, Yuzu Aoki, Sho Nishigaki, Yuki Tachibana, Raizou Ishikawa, Joey Iwanaga, Shunya Asano, Yuki Sakurai, Yuki Kura, Mei Hata, Masataka Kubota	
A U G U S T	7	Till We Meet Again on the Starry Hill	Takehiko Shinjō	Haruka Fukuhara, Kanata Hosoda, Natsuki Deguchi, Hana Toyoshima, Kai Inowaki, Kentaro Ito, Tomoko Nakajima, Keiko Matsuzaka, Chieko Baisho	
A U G U S T	8	The Ribbon Hero	Yuki Igarashi	Saya, Seiran Kobayashi, Koki Uchiyama	
A U G U S T	14	Patlabor EZY: File 2	Yutaka Izubuchi	Sumire Uesaka, Kikunosuke Toya, Ami Koshimizu, Chikahiro Kobayashi, Setsuji Satō, Yume Matsumura, Megumi Hayashibara	
A U G U S T	21	The Man Who Carried the Voices of August	Shunsaku Ikehata	Masahiro Motoki, Shizuka Ishibashi, Aoi Ito, Machiko Ono, Tetsushi Tanaka, Sadao Abe	
A U G U S T	28	Lives at Right Angles	Shotaro Kobayashi	Shota Yasuda, Non, Kuu Izima, Tomohiro Takayama, Mitsuki Tanimura, Misuzu Kanno, Daikichi Sugawara	
A U G U S T	28	The Brightest Sun	Tetsuya Nakashima	Hidetoshi Nishijima, Hikari Mitsushima, Haru Kuroki, Kankurō Kudō, Shinya Tsukamoto, Tsurutaro Kataoka, Jiro Sato, Ko Shibasaki, Koji Yakusho	
A U G U S T	28	Puella Magi Madoka Magica – Walpurgisnacht: Rising	Akiyuki Shinbo	Aoi Yūki, Chiwa Saitō, Kaori Mizuhashi, Eri Kitamura, Ai Nonaka, Kana Asumi, Emiri Katō, Shion Wakayama, Tomoyo Kurosawa	
A U G U S T	28	I Don't Know You	Ryōta Nakano	Kentaro Sakaguchi, Ikoi Hayase, Mayu Hotta, Ema Kurata, Kurumi Inagaki, Misa Wada, Yuki Katayama, Daisuke Kuroda, Kenichi Takitō, Mieko Harada	
A U G U S T	28	The Invisibles	Ryo Takebayashi	Katsuya Maiguma, Riko Suzuki, Hana Kondo, Hana Yayama, Susumu Terajima, Kimiko Yo	
S E P T E M B E R	4	Guilt	Yoshiyuki Kishi	Hokuto Matsumura, Mio Imada, Tasuku Emoto, Kou Maehara, Haruka Igawa, Yo Yoshida, Jun Fubuki, Nakamura Shikan VIII, Tomokazu Miura	
S E P T E M B E R	4	Sekiro: No Defeat	Kenichi Kutsuna	Daisuke Namikawa, Miyuki Sato, Kenjiro Tsuda, Jin Urayama, Shizuka Itō, Akimitsu Takase, Takaya Hashi, Tetsuo Kanao	
S E P T E M B E R	11	Man	Koji Maeda	Shohei Uno, Mamoru Hagiwara, Soichiro Tanaka, Kei Otozuki, Tamae Ando, Erika Karata	
S E P T E M B E R	11	How to Generate a Perfect Crime	Ryota Kondo	Daiki Shigeoka, Nanoka Hara, Minami Tanaka, Ayumi Ito, Daisuke Kuroda, Ryu Morioka, Kisuke Tsukumo, Kanji Ishimaru	
S E P T E M B E R	11	Look Back	Hirokazu Kore-eda	Natsuki Deguchi, Aju Makita, Furi Nanase, Rokka Okada, Kayo Noro, Ryo Ikeda, Miyu Sasaki, Maho Yamada, Kankurō Kudō, Masaki Suda	
S E P T E M B E R	11	Mr. Nelson, Did You Kill People?	Shinya Tsukamoto	Rodney Hicks, Geoffrey Rush, Tatyana Ali, Mark Merphy, Lily Franky	
S E P T E M B E R	11	Match Monde	Ryusuke Kurahashi	Kotaro Daigo, Masayoshi Katsuki, Honoka Kawasaki, Gōki Maeda, Takuro Osada, Yoshiyuki Yamaguchi	
S E P T E M B E R	18	Bayside Shakedown N.E.W.	Katsuyuki Motohiro	Yūji Oda, Shuri, Jin Shirasu, Kuranosuke Sasaki, Takahisa Masuda, Kayo Noro, Shiori Tamai, Karin Fujiyoshi, Nagisa Saitō, Jiro Sato, Yūsuke Santamaria, Miki Maya, Miki Mizuno, Susumu Terajima, Masahiro Komoto, Atsushi Itō, Kouhei Matsushita, Kenichi Takitō, Yutaka Matsushige, Satoru Saito, Takehiko Ono, Soichiro Kitamura	
S E P T E M B E R	18	Satoko Always	Shuichi Okita	Kasumi Arimura, Hikari Ishida, Kashun Himeno, Daisuke Kuroda, Junko Miyabe, Yuno Izumi, Mirika Otsuki, Toharu Ogawa, Yuzu Aoki, Tomo Nakai, Yūko Nakamura, Kanata Hosoda, Yui Narumi, Mansaku Takada, Yō Yoshida, Joe Odagiri, Michitaka Tsutsui	
S E P T E M B E R	18	The Village of Eight Gravestones	Takashi Shimizu	Onoe Matsuya II, Tomoya Oku, Mayu Hotta, Gaku Sano, Kazutoyo Koyabu, Arisa Nakajima, Kiyohiko Shibukawa, Masanobu Takashima, Reiko Takashima, Kenichi Takitō	
S E P T E M B E R	25	Numb	Takuya Uchiyama	Takumi Kitamura, Rie Miyazawa, Tsukasa Enomoto, Anji Kato, Haruto Akimoto, Mariko Akama, Masatoshi Nagase	
S E P T E M B E R	25	Nagi Notes	Koji Fukada	Takako Matsu, Kenichi Matsuyama, Shizuka Ishibashi, Waku Kawaguchi, Kiyora Fujiwara, Sawako Fujima, Long Mizuma, Soge Shin	
S E P T E M B E R	25	Beasts Clutching At Straws	Hideo Jojo	Ouji Suzuka, Hiroki Narimiya, Nana Mori, Oshiro Maeda, Megumi, Macho Aoki, Ryutaro Ninomiya, Ryo Iwamatsu, Shinya Kote, Jun Fubuki	
S E P T E M B E R	25	Shadow Work	Ryohei Yoshino	Riho Yoshioka, Nao, Jun Miho, Wakana Sakai, First Summer Uika, Emi Satsuki, Takumi Kitamura, Yoshitaka Hara, Jun Fubuki	
S E P T E M B E R	25	We Are Aliens	Kohei Kadowaki	Ryota Bando, Amane Okayama, Yuto Maki, Tasuku Nakagome, Ten Yamasaki, Kemuri Matsui	
S E P T E M B E R	25	Matched: True Love	Eiji Uchida	Tao Tsuchiya, Daisuke Sakuma, Kwak Dong-yeon, Hana Toyoshima, Yuki Kura, Sei Matobu	

=== October – December ===
Opening		Title	Director	Cast	Ref.
O C T O B E R	2	All Our Tomorrows	Yūki Yamato	Haruna Kawaguchi, Mahiro Takasugi, Honoka Matsumoto, Runa Nakashima, Kurumi Shimizu, Hideyuki Kasahara, Akinaga Toyomoto, Hayate Ichinose, Mari Hoshino, Misato Morita, David Ito, Satomi Kobayashi	
O C T O B E R	2	Part-time Death Angel	Mai Sakai	Daigo Nishihata, Riko Fukumoto, Nagisa Shibuya, Jun Saitō, Rana Izutani, Aimi Satsukawa, Makiya Yamaguchi, Yukiyoshi Ozawa	
O C T O B E R	2	Echoes of Kiriko	Toshiro Saiga	Kyōka Suzuki, Ikue Sakakibara, Hiroyuki Konishi, Shin Takuma, Yuko Natori	
O C T O B E R	2	First Voice	Tetsu Maeda	Haruka Ayase, First Summer Uika, Honoka Matsumoto, Rie Minemura, Maho Yamada, Asuka Kudo, Katamari Mizukawa, Ouji Suzuka, Takaya Sakoda, Yoshi Sakou, Tae Kimura, Michitaka Tsutsui	
O C T O B E R	2	F(r)iction	Yuri Takei	Koshi Mizukami, Haru Kuroki, Mizuki Yamashita, Eiko Koike, Kuranosuke Sasaki	
O C T O B E R	2	Kill Your Tears, Okiharu	Hitoshi Yazaki	Alice Hirose, Taisei Kido, Shinnosuke Mitsushima, Kie Kitano, Naho Toda, Toshie Negishi	
O C T O B E R	2	Nigero Ojosan	Chihiro Ito	Satoru Iguchi, Mai Fukagawa, Kodai Asaka, Aoba Kawai, Taketo Tanaka	
O C T O B E R	9	Girls und Panzer das Finale: Part 5	Tsutomu Mizushima	Mai Fuchigami, Ai Kayano, Mami Ozaki, Ikumi Nakagami, Yuka Iguchi	
O C T O B E R	9	To You in the Beyond	Junichi Wada	Hiiro Ishibashi, Anna Nagase, Shimba Tsuchiya, Sumire Uesaka, Wataru Hatano, Nobuhiko Okamoto, Yoshitsugu Matsuoka, Naohito Fujiki, Hiroshi Tamaki	
O C T O B E R	9	You, Like a Star	Michihito Fujii	Ryusei Yokohama, Suzu Hirose, Hokuto Matsumura, Anne Nakamura, Gaku Hamada, Machiko Ono, Yoshino Kimura, Yuriko Ishida, Hiroki Hasegawa	
O C T O B E R	16	Mentor	Keisuke Yoshida	Hayato Isomura, Seiya Suezawa, Haruka Kinami, Wakana Sakai, Maiko Kawakami, Jinya Futamura, Asuka Kurosawa, Taijiro Tamura, Go Ayano	
O C T O B E R	16	Children Untold	Miwa Nishikawa	Ami Koyae, Fumi Nikaido, Ryota Bando, Yukiya Kitamura, Yō Yoshida, Yuichiro Hayama, Shonosuke Kobayashi, Ryuto Iwata, Soraji Shibuya, Hinata Takeuchi, Kaito Sakurai, Kotone Hanase, Yutaka Takenouchi, Junichi Okada, Yūko Tanaka, Koji Yakusho	
O C T O B E R	23	In the Clear Moonlit Dusk	Kentaro Takemura	Shunsuke Michieda, Seira Anzai, Rintaro Mizusawa, Yuna Hoshino, Sayu Suzukawa, Takato Okura, Tatsumi Asa, Yūki Yoda, Naohito Fujiki	
O C T O B E R	23	Love Me Kill Me	Tsukuru Matsuki	Hokuto Yoshino, Airi Suzuki, Asuka Kudo, Ourin, Aimi Satsukawa, Issei, Shun Sugata, Yasukaze Motomiya	
O C T O B E R	23	Bad Lieutenant: Tokyo	Takashi Miike	Shun Oguri, Lily James, Shotaro Mamiya, Liv Morgan, Shūhei Nomura, Nanase Nishino, Yuka Kouri, Takanori Iwata, Keisuke Watanabe, Hideo Nakano, Jun Murakami, Jun Kunimura, Hiroshi Tachi	
O C T O B E R	23	Dot to Dot: Will I Be Single Forever?	Yuko Hakota	Kasumi Mori, Ryuya Wakaba, Yuu Kashii, Haruka Imou, Kentaro Tamura, Tomo Kasajima, Asuka Kurosawa, Kazuko Shirakawa, Hidekazu Mashima, Gin Maeda	
O C T O B E R	23	Period	Keiji Miyano	Rina Takeda, Leiya Seguchi, Kyusaku Shimada, Ayaka Imoto, Narimi Arimori, Masato Hagiwara	
O C T O B E R	30	Ryuji	Nobuo Mizuta	Yuya Yagira, Rina Kawaei, Riku Hagiwara, Junon, Misato Tanaka, Ryuki, Chihara Junior, Ken Miyake, Hideaki Itō	
O C T O B E R	30	The Potentials	Shoichi Morimoto, Takuma Sato	Go Morita, Aoi Morikawa, Yuri Kawakami, Ikoi Hayase, Koki Maeda, Kinako Kobayashi, Marika Matsumoto, Hiroshi Abe, Tetsuya Takeda	
O C T O B E R	30	Echoes of Motherhood	Ryutaro Nakagawa	Momoko Fukuchi, Naomi Kawase, Kanichiro, Aki Asakura, Sara Minami, Takahiro Miura, Shiori Kubo, Yukiyo Nakao	
N O V E M B E R	3	Godzilla Minus Zero	Takashi Yamazaki	Ryunosuke Kamiki, Minami Hamabe, Yuki Yamada, Kuranosuke Sasaki, Jun Kunimura, Miou Tanaka, Sae Nagatani, Sakura Ando, Masami Nagasawa, Min Tanaka, Hidetaka Yoshioka	
N O V E M B E R	5	One Year to Live, Buy a Man	Hiroki Kazama	Ko Shibasaki, Eiji Akaso, Michitaka Tsutsui, Naomi Nishida, Mari Hamada, Yui Narumi, Yoko Moriguchi, Ryubi Miyase, Ichika Osaki, Koen Kondo	
N O V E M B E R	6	Kamen Rider Kabuto 20th: The One Who Inherits the Heavens	Hidenori Ishida	Yuki Sato, Hidenori Tokuyama, Kazuki Kato, Tomohisa Yuge, Yoshiyuki Yamaguchi, Hirotaro Honda	
N O V E M B E R	6	Three Millimeters to You	Chun Jinrung	Sōya Kurokawa, Kim Ji-an, Towa Araki, Ikoi Hayase, Soji Arai, Park Ji-hwan, Jang Hye-jin, Choi Deok-moon, Megumi, Wataru Ichinose, Ryohei Otani	
N O V E M B E R	6	Two Cigarettes, Three Nights	Yukiko Mishima	Mayu Matsuoka, Ryo Narita, Yuki Inoue, Ayumu Nakajima, Miyu Sakihi, Takahiro Miura, Kimiko Yo, Shinnosuke Ikehata	
N O V E M B E R	6	4 Outs: Back to the Ballgame	Masahiro Inagaki	Masaki Aiba, Yuina Kuroshima, Toshio Matsumoto, Rin Fukumatsu, Wataru Hyuga, Kotone Hanase, Hiro Komura, Aki Maeda, Yuki Saito, Kuranosuke Sasaki	
N O V E M B E R	6	Hoshi no Kyoshitsu	Ryutaro Nakagawa	Hiyori Sakurada, Nobuko Sendo, Masato Hagiwara, Toranosuke Kobayashi, Natsume Mito, Masahiro Komoto, Oideyasu Oda, Taizo Harada, Yōko Maki, Kotaro Koizumi, Mie Nakao, Atsuko Asano, Gaku Yamamoto	
N O V E M B E R	6	Grotesqqque	Atsushi Nishigori	Chika Anzai, Kana Ichinose, Maaya Uchida, Rumi Okubo, Rie Kugimiya, Miyu Tomita, Ikumi Hasegawa, Saori Hayami, Gen Hoshino, Sara Minami, Miku Ichinose, Nagi Inoue, Nao Tomisato, Aruno Nakanishi	
N O V E M B E R	13	Expelled from Paradise: Resonance from the Heart	Seiji Mizushima	Ayane Sakura, Saori Hayami, Yoshino Aoyama, Sally Amaki	
N O V E M B E R	13	Never Guilty	Katsuhide Motoki	Seiyō Uchino, Wakana Matsumoto, Ryo Ryusei, Rie Mimura, Kanji Ishimaru, Toshihiro Yashiba, Miou Tanaka, Masaki Miyra, Takahiro Fujimoto, Kazuki Kitamura	
N O V E M B E R	13	Cursed Meme	Kan Yamamoto	Ikoi Hayase, Airu Kubozuka, Baku Idegami, Alisa Sakamaki, Mamoru Hagiwara, Masahiro Sunada, Sono Hiramatsu	
N O V E M B E R	13	All the Lovers in the Night	Yukiko Sode	Yukino Kishii, Tadanobu Asano, Misato Morita, Mai Fukagawa, Akihisa Shiono, Yūko Nakamura, Mijika Nagai, Kilala Inori, Tomo Nakai, Yuta Hayashi	
N O V E M B E R	13	2126, Looking for the Sea's Star	Shusuke Kaneko	Keisuke Watanabe, Wakana Aoi, Shusaku Kamikawa, Sakurako Konishi, Masato Hagiwara, Satomi Kobayashi	
N O V E M B E R	13	Silver Express	Miki Tanaka	Yui Okamoto, Hayato Kurihara, Riho Nakamura, Tatsuya Yamawaki, Rio Takahashi, Yuka Nakashima, Tomo Nakai, Rina Saito, Yoshiro Sakuma, Keisuke Otaki, Kengo Kora, Yo Yoshida	
N O V E M B E R	20	A Bouquet of Light for You	Hiroshi Ando	Nanoka Hara, Ryuto Sakuma, Rei Mukai, Hisashi Yoshizawa, Naho Toda, Hidekazu Mashima	
N O V E M B E R	20	Witch on the Holy Night	Masashi Takeuchi	Haruka Tomatsu, Kana Hanazawa, Yūsuke Kobayashi	
N O V E M B E R	20	The Day After Sunday	Takuya Kato	Haru Kuroki, Atsushi Hashimoto, Kanji Furutachi, Yukari Taki, Katsuhiro Suzuki, Yō Yoshida	
N O V E M B E R	20	The Moon Is Watching	Naoko Watanabe	Katsuya Maiguma, Riria Kojima, Hitomi Kuroki, Tokuma Nishioka, Yo Yoshida, Vincent Perez	
N O V E M B E R	20	Armored Trooper VOTOMS: Die Graue Hexe	Mamoru Oshii	Miyuki Sawashiro, Mabuki Ando, Shin-ichiro Miki, Yuki Kaji, Yuichi Nakamura, Satoshi Tsuruoka, Tomokazu Sugita, Kenta Miyake, Chafurin, Hōchū Ōtsuka, Daisuke Ono, Takayuki Sugō, Takahiro Sakurai, Sumire Uesaka,	
N O V E M B E R	27	Between Two Lovers	Nanako Hirose	Masami Nagasawa, Tasuku Emoto, Shizuka Ishibashi, Motoki Ochiai, Kemuri Matsui, Rin Nose, Ayaka Onishi, Kiyohiko Shibukawa, Reiko Kataoka, Shunsuke Kazama	
N O V E M B E R	27	Your Story: Kimi No Hanashi	Ryutaro Nakagawa	Takumi Kitamura, Natsuki Deguchi, Masaya Sano, Yu Miyazaki, Taizo Harada	
N O V E M B E R	27	Wandance	Naoya Kusaba	Jo, Anji Ikehata, Kira Yamaguchi, Ran, Tsukki, Aloha Takamatsu	
N O V E M B E R	27	Missed You, Left You, Lost You, Miss You	Manato Hamada	Shūhei Nomura, Cent Chihiro Chittiii, Toharu Ogawa, Yusuke Takahashi, Nahana, Makiko Watanabe	
D E C E M B E R	3	My Crazy Feminist Girlfriend	Keiichi Kobayashi	Mei Nagano, Taisei Kido, Junki Tozuka, Maho Nonami, Sotaro Tanaka, Hiroki Konno, Manami Higa, Yumi Asō	
D E C E M B E R	4	My Sister's Boyfriend	Mahito Kimura	Masaki Hashimoto, Runa Nakashima, Leo Matsumoto, Rinka Kumada	
D E C E M B E R	4	Ame no Etranger	Hideo Jojo	Shima Izutsu, Masahiro Higashide, Honami Sato, Katsuya Maiguma, Naoto Takenaka	
D E C E M B E R	4	Vivant: The Movie	Katsuo Fukuzawa	Masato Sakai, Hiroshi Abe, Fumi Nikaido, Ryo Ryusei, Takashi Yamanaka, Barslkhagva Batbold, Tanapak Jongjaiphar, Drum Tomisakae, Minami Takayama, Megumi Hayashibara, Sumire Hanaoka, Tsaschikher Khatanzorig, Ken Ishiguro, Gaku Hamada, Midoriko Kimura, Tori Matsuzaka, Kazunari Ninomiya, Koji Yakusho	
D E C E M B E R	11	The Apothecary Diaries: The Movie	Norihiro Naganuma	Aoi Yūki, Takeo Ōtsuka, Ai Mikami, Mariya Ise, Kensho Ono, Miyuki Sawashiro, Sumi Shimamoto	
D E C E M B E R	11	The Chain of Roses	Sakichi Sato	Ryuhei Maruyama, Erika Sawajiri, Yo Aoi, Ryo Aoki, Raiku, Haruki Nakagawa, Makoto Tanaka, Tomoyuki Kuramoto, Yuka Arai, Young Dais, Mariko Akama, Soji Arai, Takashi Miike	
D E C E M B E R	11	Monster in Sheep's Clothing	Yang Liping	Nobuyuki Suzuki, Haru Kashiwagi, Rinka Kumada, Nagisa Saitō, Kaito Yoshimura, Toshie Negishi, Reika Kirishima	
D E C E M B E R	18	Finding My Punchline	Hayato Kawai	Kazuya Ohashi, Hiyori Sakurada, Oshiro Maeda, Yoji Iwase, Kaito Sakurai, Tsuyoshi Nakagawa, Tortoise Matsumoto, Hiromi Nagasaku	
D E C E M B E R	25	Sukiyaki	Takahisa Zeze	Junichi Okada, Tori Matsuzaka, Taiga Nakano, Nana Seino, Mone Kamishiraishi, Riho Yoshioka, Motoki Omori, Tomoya Maeno, Riisa Naka, Lilas Ikuta, Junki Tozuka, Rikako Yagi, Kogaken, Tao Tsuchiya, Hiroshi Abe, Hiroko Yakushimaru	
D E C E M B E R	25	Bye Bye Love: Detective Is in the Bar	Kazuya Shiraishi	Yo Oizumi, Ryuhei Matsuda, Aju Makita, Takuma Otoo, Keiko Horiuchi, Hiromasa Taguchi, Takamitsu Nonaka, Shingo Mizusawa, Toshinori Omi, Tomoya Nakamura, Koji Yamamoto, Kyōka Suzuki	
D E C E M B E R	25	Kyoto-o	Ryota Kondo	Kentaro Maeda, Shiori Kubo, Ao Watanabe, Goro Yoshida, Hinano Nakayama, Asumi Miwa, Yūrei Yanagi	
D E C E M B E R	25	The Sound of You	Makoto Sorashita	Kei Eguchi, Rio Gushikawa, Jiro Sato, Akira Emoto	
D E C E M B E R	25	The Canary's Lullaby	Akira Ikeda	Kimiko Yo, Joe Odagiri, Liu Kuan-ting, Leo Wang, Kitaro, Hairi Katagiri, Shunya Shiraishi, Sumire Sato	

=== TBA ===
Opening		Title	Director	Cast	Ref.
U P C O M I N G	TBA	Killtube	Kazuaki Kuribayashi	Yui Tsukada, Kengo Kawanishi, Ayane Sakura	
U P C O M I N G	TBA	Busshi	Tanaka Tsunaichi	Yuya Endo, Kaho Tsuchimura, Ikkei Watanabe, Miyu Yagyu, Mariko Akama, Kanji Tsuda, Machiko Ono, Jun Murakami, Masaya Kato, Bengal	
U P C O M I N G	TBA	Daisy's Life	Masaaki Yuasa	TBA	
U P C O M I N G	TBA	Alivehoon: Beyond the Limit	Ten Shimoyama	Kalen Anzai	
U P C O M I N G	TBA	Urusai Kono Oto no Zenbu	Keigo Kato	Asuka Kawatoko, Kokoro Morita, Yoshihiko Hosoda, Karen Miyama, Tomo Nakai, Maki Kubota, Mari Iriki, Satoru Soma	
U P C O M I N G	TBA	Petrichor	Nobb Sueyoshi	Keigo Unohara, Rina Takeda	

== See also ==
- 2026 in Japan
- 2026 in Japanese television
- List of 2026 box office number-one films in Japan
