= We Are Little Zombies =

2019 film directed by Makoto Nagahisa

- Theatrical release poster
- Directed by: Makoto Nagahisa
- Written by: Makoto Nagahisa
- Produced by: Haruhiko Hasegawa; Shin'ichi Takahashi; Taihei Yamanishi; Haruki Yokohama
- Starring: Keita Ninomiya; Mondo Okumura; Satoshi Mizuno; Sena Nakajima
- Cinematography: Hiroaki Takeda
- Edited by: Maho Inamoto
- Music by: Makoto Nagahisa
- Production companies: Nikkatsu; Dentsu; Parco Co., Ltd.; Robot Communications; Sony Music Entertainment Japan
- Distributed by: Nikkatsu
- Release dates: January 27, 2019 (Sundance); June 19, 2019 (Japan)
- Running time: 120 minutes
- Country: Japan
- Language: Japanese

We Are Little Zombies (Japanese transliteration: Wī Ā Ritoru Zonbīzu) is a 2019 Japanese coming-of-age comedy-drama film written, directed and composed by Makoto Nagahisa in his feature directorial debut. The film was shown at both the Sundance and Berlin International Film Festivals in the United States and Germany respectively.

== Plot ==
Four 13-year old children, the lead character Hikaru (Keita Ninomiya), Takemura (Mondo Okumura), Ishi (Satoshi Mizuno) and Ikuko (Sena Nakajima), meet outside a crematorium. Coming from challenging backgrounds, and often having unfortunate relationships with their family, they all dislike their recently deceased parents, all killed in unfortunate circumstances (automobile accident, double suicide, a wok-related fire and murder by the hands of a pedophilic piano teacher). They are all being cremated.

Not trusting adults, they bond over their shared attribute of not sharing emotion. At the same age, they decided to run away and form their own pop music band, which they call "The Little Zombies". People like their addictive music, and they go about meeting various people that will shape their future”. The children move through the story, dealing with their grief.

== Cast ==
- Keita Ninomiya as Hikari
- Satoshi Mizuno as Ishi
- Rinko Kikuchi as Ikuko Ibu
- Masatoshi Nagase as Haruhiko Ibu
- Yûki Kudô as Rie Ôta
- Kuranosuke Sasaki as Gen Takami

== Screenings ==
The film was shown in the following festivals:

- Tokyo International Film Festival
- Sundance Film Festival
- Berlin International Film Festival
- Melbourne International Film Festival
- New Zealand International Film Festival

== Reception ==
On the review aggregator website Rotten Tomatoes, 93% of 55 critics' reviews are positive, with an average rating of 7.8/10. The website's critics' consensus reads, "We Are Little Zombies mixes the playful and the profane with a stylish and visually inventive look at death, abandonment, and the grieving process." A positive review at rogerbert.com stated that the film was "a little hard to describe: it’s not really about how music can transform and/or improve you. Or maybe it’s not just about that, since writer/director Makoto Nagahisa’s film is also sometimes a post-punk musical about authenticity and selling out, as well as a manic hangout comedy starring the Little Zombies, a quartet of young adults who are too young to drink or drive. “We Are Little Zombies” also isn’t just an entertaining, if grim, fantasy about teen angst as it’s experienced by a group of despondent Gen Zers who sometimes use, but don’t ultimately fit, the mold for success that’s been left behind by their Gen X and Millennial predecessors."
