= List of 2026 box office number-one films in Japan =

The following is a list of 2026 box office number-one films in Japan by week. When the number-one film in gross is not the same as the number-one film in admissions, both are listed.

Week #	Date	Film	Gross	Notes
1	January 4, 2026	Zootopia 2	US$6,725,400	
2	January 11, 2026	Zootopia 2	US$4,119,400	
3	January 18, 2026	Zootopia 2	US$3,047,500	
4	January 25, 2026	Zootopia 2	US$2,702,400	
5	February 1, 2026	Mobile Suit Gundam: Hathaway – The Sorcery of Nymph Circe	US$5,478,900	
6	February 8, 2026	Until We Meet Again	US$4,082,200	
7	February 15, 2026	Until We Meet Again	US$2,659,000	
8	February 22, 2026	Kyojo: Requiem	US$3,920,200	
9	March 1, 2026	Doraemon: New Nobita and the Castle of the Undersea Devil	US$4,971,900	
10	March 8, 2026	Doraemon: New Nobita and the Castle of the Undersea Devil	US$3,274,800	In attendance
10	March 8, 2026	Wicked: For Good	US$3,350,500	In gross
11	March 15, 2026	Doraemon: New Nobita and the Castle of the Undersea Devil	US$2,240,300	In attendance
11	March 15, 2026	Golden Kamuy: Assault on Abashiri Prison	US$2,309,100	In gross
12	March 22, 2026	Doraemon: New Nobita and the Castle of the Undersea Devil	US$2,790,500	
13	March 29, 2026	Doraemon: New Nobita and the Castle of the Undersea Devil	US$2,790,500	
14	April 5, 2026	Doraemon: New Nobita and the Castle of the Undersea Devil	US$1,731,700	
15	April 12, 2026	Detective Conan: Fallen Angel of the Highway	US$21,927,000	
16	April 19, 2026	Detective Conan: Fallen Angel of the Highway	US$10,816,600	
17	April 26, 2026	The Super Mario Galaxy Movie	US$10,059,700	
18	May 3, 2026	The Super Mario Galaxy Movie	US$7,497,600	
19	May 10, 2026	The Devil Wears Prada 2	US$3,500,300	
20	May 17, 2026	The Super Mario Galaxy Movie	US$2,266,100	
21	May 24, 2026	The Mandalorian and Grogu	US$4,712,600	
22	May 31, 2026	The Mandalorian and Grogu	US$2,665,100	
23	June 7, 2026	The Mandalorian and Grogu	US$2,012,500	
24	June 14, 2026	Michael	US$6,806,500	
25	June 21, 2026	Michael	US$4,943,600	
26	June 28, 2026	Michael	US$4,120,000	
26	July 5, 2026	Toy Story 5	US$14,873,900	
27	July 12, 2026	Toy Story 5	US$10,384,100	
28	July 19, 2026	Kingdom 5: The Clash of Souls	US$9,737,300	
29	July 26, 2026	Chiikawa the Movie: The Secret of the Mermaid Island	US$13,694,800	
30	August 2, 2026	Spider-Man: Brand New Day	US$9,934,000	
31	August 9, 2026	Chiikawa the Movie: The Secret of the Mermaid Island	US$10,698,900	
32	August 16, 2026	Chiikawa the Movie: The Secret of the Mermaid Island	US$5,622,500	
33	August 23, 2026	Chiikawa the Movie: The Secret of the Mermaid Island	US$7,802,600	
34	August 30, 2026	Puella Magi Madoka Magica – Walpurgisnacht: Rising	US$5,885,200	
35	September 6, 2026	Chiikawa the Movie: The Secret of the Mermaid Island	US$9,073,400	
36	September 13, 2026	Chiikawa the Movie: The Secret of the Mermaid Island	US$2,764,500	In attendance
36	September 13, 2026	The Odyssey	US$2,925,800	In gross
37	September 20, 2026	Chiikawa the Movie: The Secret of the Mermaid Island	US$6,292,200	
38	September 27, 2026	Bayside Shakedown N.E.W.	US$2,291,200	
39	October 4, 2026	All Our Tomorrows	US$2,788,200	
40	October 11, 2026	Chiikawa the Movie: The Secret of the Mermaid Island	US$3,560,800	In attendance
40	October 11, 2026	Resident Evil	US$3,965,500	In gross
41	October 18, 2026	All Our Tomorrows	US$2,831,500	
42	October 25, 2026	All Our Tomorrows	US$2,504,000	
43	November 1, 2026	All Our Tomorrows	US$1,690,000	
44	November 8, 2026	Godzilla Minus Zero	US$7,151,200	
45	November 15, 2026	Godzilla Minus Zero	US$5,393,000	

== Highest-grossing films ==
International film Japanese film
*Last updated on November 16, 2026.

Highest-grossing films in 2026
Rank	Title	Gross
1	Chiikawa the Movie: The Secret of the Mermaid Island	¥18.96 billion (US$118.8 million)
2	Zootopia 2	¥15.71 billion (US$98.4 million)
3	Detective Conan: Fallen Angel of the Highway	¥13.70 billion (US$85.8 million)
4	Toy Story 5	¥13.04 billion (US$81.7 million)
5	Michael	¥8.84 billion (US$55.4 million)
6	The Super Mario Galaxy Movie	¥7.94 billion (US$49.7 million)
7	Kingdom 5: The Clash of Souls	¥6.90 billion (US$43.2 million)
8	Spider-Man: Brand New Day	¥5.85 billion (US$36.6 million)
9	The Devil Wears Prada 2	¥5.49 billion (US$34.4 million)
10	Until We Meet Again	¥4.70 billion (US$29.4 million)

== See also ==
- List of Japanese films of 2026
