= 39th Yokohama Film Festival =

2018 film festival in Yokohama, Japan

- Location: Yokohama, Kanagawa, Japan
- Festival date: 28 January 2018

The 39th Yokohama Film Festival (第３９回ヨコハマ映画祭) was held on 28 January 2018 at Yokohama, Kanagawa, Japan. The awards ceremony was held in the city's Kanagawa Prefectural Music Hall, the results having been announced on 2 December 2018.

== Awards ==
- Best Film: - The Tokyo Night Sky Is Always the Densest Shade of Blue
- Best Director: Kazuya Shiraishi - Birds Without Names, Dawn of the Felines
- Yoshimitsu Morita Memorial Best New Director:
  - Kei Ishikawa - Gukoroku: Traces of Sin
  - Yukihiro Morigaki - Goodbye, Grandpa!
- Best Screenplay: Yuya Ishii - The Tokyo Night Sky Is Always the Densest Shade of Blue
- Best Cinematographer: Yoichi Kamagari - The Tokyo Night Sky Is Always the Densest Shade of Blue
- Best Actor: Sosuke Ikematsu - The Tokyo Night Sky Is Always the Densest Shade of Blue
- Best Actress: Yū Aoi - Birds Without Names
- Best Supporting Actor:
  - Sansei Shiomi - Outrage Coda
  - Tori Matsuzaka - Birds Without Names
- Best Supporting Actress:
  - Asami Usuda - Gukoroku: Traces of Sin
  - Wakana Matsumoto - Gukoroku: Traces of Sin
- Best Newcomer:
  - Shizuka Ishibashi - The Tokyo Night Sky Is Always the Densest Shade of Blue
  - Yukino Kishii - Goodbye, Grandpa!
- Judges' Special Award: Nikkatsu Roman Porno reboot project
- Special Grand Prize: Toshiyuki Nishida - Outrage Coda

== Top 10 ==
1. The Tokyo Night Sky Is Always the Densest Shade of Blue
2. Dear Etranger
3. Birds Without Names
4. Wilderness
5. Side Job
6. Close-Knit
7. Gukoroku: Traces of Sin
8. The Third Murder
9. A Boy Who Wished to Be Okuda Tamio and a Girl Who Drove All Men Crazy
10. Outrage Coda

runner-up. Before We Vanish
