= Dragons of Wonderhatch =

- Genre: Fantasy
- Directed by: Kentaro Hagiwara
- Starring: Sena Nakajima; Daiken Okudaira
- Music by: Hisaki Kato; Yasunori Nishiki
- Country of origin: Japan
- Original language: Japanese
- No. of seasons: 1
- No. of episodes: 8

Production
- Running time: 45 minutes
- Production company: Production IG

Original release
- Network: Disney+
- Release: December 20, 2023 – February 21, 2024

Dragons of Wonderhatch is a Japanese live-action/animated series.

== Plot ==
Nagi, a girl with synesthesia, from the real world meets a boy from a fantasy world, where dragons exist and are rideable, called Thaim.

== Production ==
Dragons of Wonderhatch was produced by Production I.G and has two directors, Kentaro Hagiwara, for the live action segments and Takashi Otsuka. Its original score was written by Hisaki Kato and Yasunori Nishiki.

== Release ==
Dragons of Wonderhatch was first released on December 20, on Disney+ and Hulu.

== Reception ==
Dragons of Wonderhatch received mixed reviews from critics.
