= Miyuki Koizumi =

Japanese model

Miyuki Koizumi 小泉 深雪
- Born: January 28, 1979 (age 47)
- Spouse: Gaku Hamada (m. 2011)
- Children: 1
- Modeling information
- Height: 1.79 m (5 ft 10 1/2 in)
- Hair color: Black
- Eye color: Brown
- Agency: Tateoka Office Co., Ltd
- Website: Tateoka Office

Miyuki Koizumi (小泉 深雪, Koizumi Miyuki; born January 28, 1979) is a Japanese model from Niigata Prefecture, Japan. As well as modelling the Paris collection, she appears in domestic adverts and national magazines. She is currently signed to Tateoka Office Co., Ltd.

== Appearances ==
=== Shows ===
Paris

- Christian Dior
- John Galliano
- Issey Miyake

Tokyo

- Chanel
- Gucci
- Fendi
- Armani
- Celine
- Givenchy
- Max Mara
- Gianni Versace
- Sonia Rykiel
- Jean Paul Gaultier
- Vivienne Westwood

=== Commercials ===
- Shiseidō Face
- Bigi Halfmoon
- Daihatsu Move
- Kao Corporation Ravenous
- Evian
- Kriza
- Shiseidō (2000)
- Coca-Cola Diet Coke
- POLA Inc.
- Asahi Breweries Super Dry - "The Super Dry Films"
- Mitsui Fudosan Mitsui Outlet Park (April 2008)
- Kellogg's (Japan) Special K "Minus Selection" (April 2009)

=== Magazines ===
Overseas

- Vogue (Taiwan)
- madame figaro (France)
- Wall Paper (England)
- Glue Magazine (America)
- Maxim (America)

Domestic (Japan)

- Elle
- Ryūkōtsūshin
- Dune
- Crea
- Luci
- Grazia
- weet
- an-an
- Frau
- Miss
- with
- More
- non-no
- oggi
- Style

=== Television ===
- A-Studio (TBS) - assistant

=== CD ===
- Gloria (1999 single) - collaboration with Haruo Chikada and Makihiko Araki)
