= My Small Land =

2022 film

- Theatrical release poster
- Directed by: Ema Kawawada
- Produced by: Hiromi Morishige; Megumi Banse; Hideki Fujinami; Yu Shibuya; Antoine Morand
- Starring: Lina Arashi; Daiken Okudaira
- Cinematography: Hidetoshi Shinomiya
- Edited by: Shinichi Fushima
- Music by: ROTH BART BARON
- Production companies: AOI Pro.; NHK; Film-in-Evolution; Bandai Namco Arts; Bunbuku Inc.; GAGA Corporation; Kodansha
- Release dates: 12 February 2022 (BIFF); 6 May 2022 (Japan)
- Running time: 114 minutes
- Country: Japan
- Languages: Japanese; Kurdish; Turkish

My Small Land (Japanese: マイスモールランド) is a 2022 Japanese drama film directed by Ema Kawawada.

== Synopsis ==
Sarya is a Kurdish refugee, living in Saitama Prefecture, Japan, with her younger brother, sister, and father. Her mother died in her unnamed home country (in Kurdistan), and her father moved them to Japan to escape political detention. They live in an apartment. Their father works on a construction site with other Kurds. Sarya secretly gets a job at a convenience store. There, she meets Sota, the owner's nephew. They strike up a friendship.

Sarya is caught between two cultures, feeling loyalty to her new home in Japan, while her father looks towards his Kurdish roots. This includes his wish for Sarya to marry a Kurdish boy who lives in Japan. Sarya has no interest in the boy, and leaves the room when it is discussed. Sarya's father's plea for refugee status is rejected. He is told they cannot work, and must stay in Saitama. Sarya brings Sota home. Her father is initially receptive, however later tells her she cannot spend time with him, and slaps Sarya.

Her father is arrested and imprisoned when he is found to be working illegally. The father believes the case is lost, and decides to return to his homeland, where he awaits arrest. Meanwhile, Sarya loses her job. However, their solicitor reveals her father has taken a deal whereby he leaves, but his children are allowed to stay. Eventually, Sarya and her children's life continue, and Sarya is thankful that her life can continue in Japan.

== Cast ==
- Lina Arashi as Sarya
- Daiken Okudaira as Sota

== Production ==
Her father, sister, and brother are played by her siblings and father. The film was forced to stop production at various times, because of COVID-19 restrictions.

The director, Kawawada, was supported by Japanese director Hirokazu Kore-eda. The film was shot in 2022, mainly in the Tokyo and Saitama districts. Arashi was 17 when the film was shot.

== Awards ==
The film was awarded the "Amnesty International Film Award Special Mention" at the 72nd Berlin International Film Festival.
