= Between Two Lovers =

2026 Japanese film

- Promotional poster
- Japanese: このごにおよんで愛など
- Literally: This is the kind of love that you can't find
- Directed by: Nanako Hirose
- Screenplay by: Nanako Hirose
- Produced by: Daiju Koide
- Starring: Masami Nagasawa; Tasuku Emoto; Shizuka Ishibashi
- Cinematography: Yao Hung-I
- Edited by: Nanako Hirose
- Music by: HIMI
- Production company: K2 Pictures
- Distributed by: K2 Pictures
- Release dates: October 11, 2026 (BIFF); November 27, 2026 (Japan)
- Running time: 128 minutes
- Countries: Japan; Taiwan
- Language: Japanese

Between Two Lovers (Japanese: このごにおよんで愛など) is a 2026 Japanese-Taiwanese romantic drama film written and directed by Nanako Hirose. Starring Masami Nagasawa, Tasuku Emoto and Shizuka Ishibashi in roles of Shi, her husband Morio and her woman lover Junna, who try to cohabit under the same roof.

The film had its world premiere and competed in the Competition section of the 31st Busan International Film Festival on October 11, 2026 for 'Busan Awards'.

== Synopsis ==
The film explores different forms of love, as the three characters struggle with jealousy, desire, commitment and the difficulties of living with the people they care about.

Shiori Kojima, a picture-book writer, has been married to Morio, an employee at an insurance company, for three years. However, Shiori is secretly having a relationship with her editor, Junna Kuramochi. While Morio hopes they will soon have a child, Shiori is unsure whether she should remain with him, choose Junna, or start a family with Morio while continuing her relationship with Junna. After the three unexpectedly spend time together and get along well, Shiori suggests that all three of them live together. Morio and Junna are shocked by the proposal and reject it. However, an unexpected event changes their relationships and forces them to reconsider their feelings for one another.

== Cast ==
- Masami Nagasawa as Shiori Kojima
- Tasuku Emoto as Morio
- Shizuka Ishibashi as Junna Kuramochi
- Shunsuke Kazama as Kentaro Inui
- Kiyohiko Shibukawa as Mitsuhiro Soejima
- Motoki Ochiai as Kon-chan
- Kemuri Matsui as Sugi-kun
- Reiko Kataoka as Ritsuko Sakoda
- Noserin as Ayumu Sakurai
- Onishi Reika as Midori Inui

== Production ==
The project was conceived from the idea of the director Nanako Hirose that "there should be more diverse forms of family in the world", which she developed and wrote the screenplay.

In 2023, the film project won two awards CJ ENM Award, and ARRI Award at Asian Project Market run in conjunction with Busan International Film Festival.

A Japan-Taiwan co-production, the film was developed by Bunbuku and produced and distributed by K2 Pictures. Principal photography took place in September and October 2025, and was completed in March 2026.

== Release ==
Between Two Lovers had its World Premiere in the Competition section of the 31st Busan International Film Festival on October 11, 2026 and vied for 'Busan Awards'.

The film will be released on November 27, 2026 in Japanese theatres by K2 Pictures.

== Accolades ==
The film competed for various Vision Awards at Busan International Film Festival.

Award	Date of ceremony	Category	Recipient(s)	Result	Ref.
Busan International Film Festival	15 October 2026	Busan Awards: Best Film	Between Two Lovers	Nominated	
