= Never After Dark =

2026 Japanese horror film

- Original Japanese language film poster

Japanese name
- Katakana: ネバーアフターダーク
- Directed by: Dave Boyle
- Screenplay by: Dave Boyle
- Produced by: Dave Boyle; Kento Kaku; Kosuke Tsutsumi
- Starring: Moeka Hoshi; Kurumi Inagaki; Kento Kaku; Tae Kimura; Bokuzō Masana
- Cinematography: Patrick Ouziel
- Edited by: Chieko Suzaki
- Music by: Jonathan Snipes
- Production companies: Signal 181; XYZ Films; TOHO Next
- Distributed by: Magnolia Pictures
- Release date: September 25, 2026
- Running time: 104 minutes
- Country: Japan
- Language: Japanese
- Box office: $405,193

Never After Dark (Japanese: ネバーアフターダーク) is a 2026 Japanese-language supernatural horror film written and directed by Dave Boyle. It stars Moeka Hoshi as Airi, a medium with the ability to contact and exorcise lingering ghosts from a place. She is hired to remove a dangerous spirit from a remote house, but uncovers dark secrets in the process. The film's cast also includes Kurumi Inagaki, Kento Kaku, Tae Kimura and Bokuzō Masana. Never After Dark was theatrically released on September 25, 2026 by Magnolia Pictures.

== Plot ==
A young woman named Airi works as a wandering spiritual medium, hired by the living to exorcise ghosts. She is assisted in her duties by the ghost of her older sister, Miku, who died as a young girl.

Airi arrives at a remote bed and breakfast which is owned by widow Teiko. Teiko claims to have encountered a ghost around the property, and asks that Airi gets rid of it. Her son Gunji is skeptical of his mother and suspects Airi of scamming them. To their disappointment, Airi requests they vacate the property while she works, and tells them she will never work at night, since the veil between the spirit and physical world is too thin.

Guided by Miku, Airi encounters the ghost, a man with a gruesome mouth injury. The ghost pays little attention to Airi and is fixated on searching a room for something. Investigating, Airi discovers a box filled with human teeth. Miku grows wary of the spirit and requests that Airi leaves, but Airi assures her it will be an ordinary job. A suspicious Gunji arrives that night to check on Airi and the two bond over music. The following day, Airi enters the spirit world to communicate with the ghost, but is shocked when he turns aggressive and chases her. Airi narrowly escapes him, returning to the real world. Inspecting the teeth, Airi is disturbed to receive flashes of murder victims having their teeth removed.

A man arrives at the property, claiming to be a former tenant and asks Airi several questions which she avoids answering. As he leaves, Airi notices he is wearing the same watch as the spirit. Realising the ghost is the man in the future, Airi attempts to communicate with the ghost again but is attacked. Airi plans to flee and argues with Miku about how she fled after Miku was fatally poisoned. Airi passes out and is later awoken by a police officer who says he was called to the property by someone claiming there were four bodies inside. Airi, Teiko and Gunji discover Airi's car has been sabotaged.

The police officer encounters the man as he drives away. The man murders him, revealing himself to be a serial killer collecting the teeth that Airi found. The killer returns to the hotel as night falls and holds Gunji at gunpoint, forcing him to remove his teeth. Gunji attacks him and flees but is shot dead. Airi and Teiko attempt to escape but Teiko is killed. Airi lures the killer into a trap and is stabbed but manages to trap him in the spirit world. His ghost attacks him as Airi fatally wounds him in the mouth with the axe, creating the ghost's injury. As Airi bleeds out, she is comforted by Miku who encourages her spirit to let go.

== Cast ==
- Moeka Hoshi as Airi
- Kurumi Inagaki as Miku
- Kento Kaku as Gunji Nakazawa
- Tae Kimura as Teiko
- Bokuzō Masana as Inokoshi

== Release ==
The film premiered at SXSW and was picked up by Magnolia Pictures for distribution. Never After Dark was theatrically released on September 25, 2026. It was released on digital on October 27, 2026.

== Reception ==
=== Box office ===
So far in 2026, the film has grossed around $400,000 domestically and internationally.

=== Critical response ===
According to review aggregator Rotten Tomatoes, 98% of 61 critics have given Never After Dark a positive review. The website's critics consensus reads, "A chilling ghost story that deftly reimagines Japanese horror conventions, Never After Dark pairs Moeka Hoshi's compelling performance with elegant craftsmanship and slow-building, inexorable dread." The film has a score of 71 on Metacritic, indicating generally favorable reviews. It was noted as a New York Times critic's pick by Beatrice Loayza, who called it a "gruesomely sinister and eerily atmospheric ghost story", and noted that it was reminiscent of Kiyoshi Kurosawa's style of psychological horror. While some reviews noted the film's initially slow pace, they nonetheless called it a "real thrill" and "expertly executed".

=== Accolades ===
The film won both audience and jury prizes at several film festivals, including the Golden Raven top prize at Brussels International Fantastic Film Festival and the grand jury prize at Overlook Film Festival. The A.V. Club named it one of their most anticipated films of SXSW in 2026, where it won the Midnighter Audience Award.
