= Shizuka Ishibashi =

Japanese actress (born 1994)

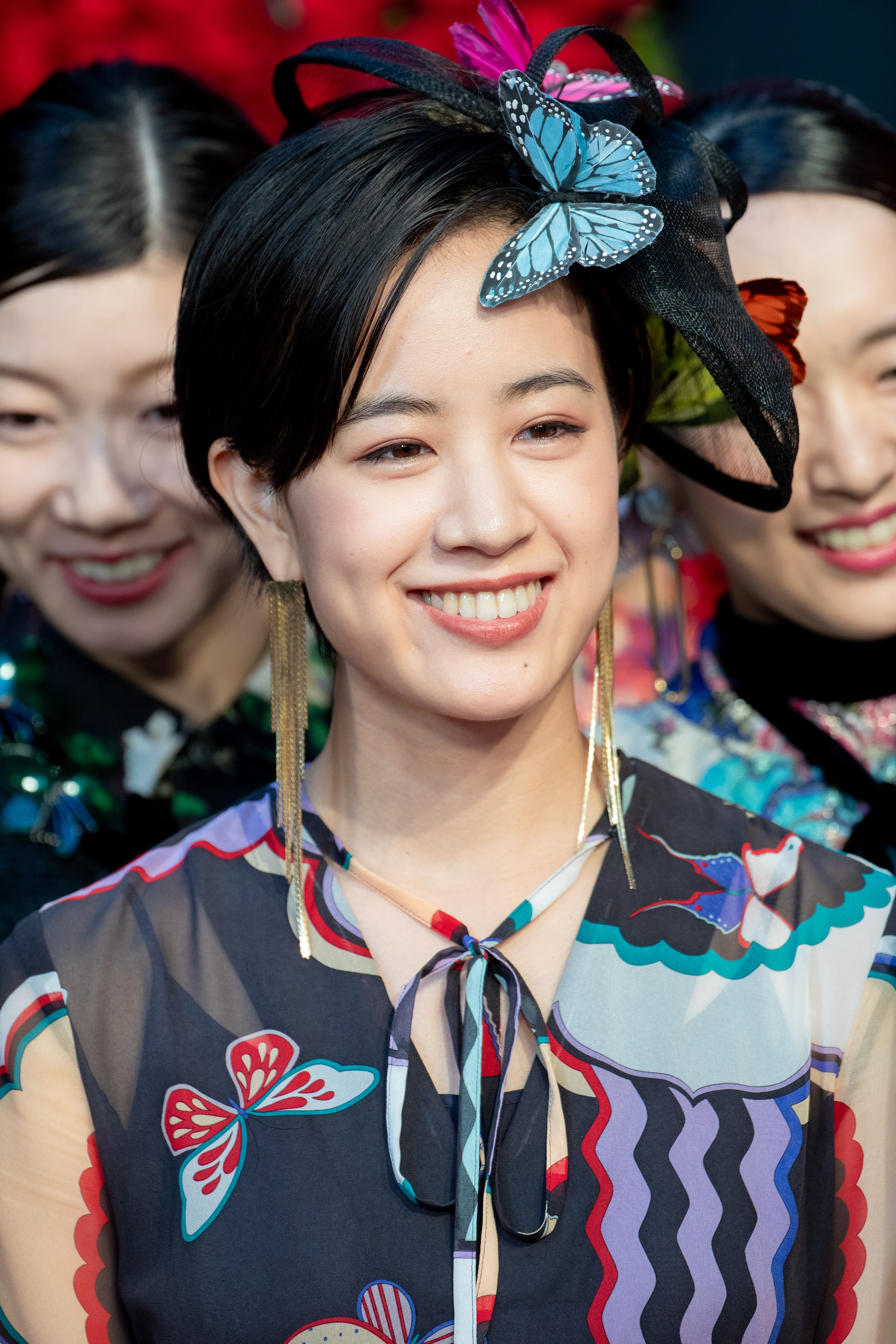
- Ishibashi at the Tokyo International Film Festival in 2018
- Born: July 8, 1994 (age 32); Tokyo, Japan
- Occupations: Actress, dancer
- Years active: 2015–present
- Parents: Ryo Ishibashi; Mieko Harada

Shizuka Ishibashi (石橋 静河, Ishibashi Shizuka; born July 8, 1994) is a Japanese actress. She is represented by the talent agency Hirata International.

== Biography ==
Ishibashi was born as the second of three children of actors Ryo Ishibashi and Mieko Harada. She began classical ballet at the age of four and in 2009 went abroad to study at ballet schools in Boston and Calgary, before returning to Japan in 2013.

After her return, she was active as a contemporary dancer until she started acting in 2015. From January to April 2016, she appeared on stage in the Noda Hideki directed play Gekirin. In 2017, she had the leading role in Yuya Ishii's film The Tokyo Night Sky Is Always the Densest Shade of Blue. She won numerous awards for her role in the film, including the Blue Ribbon Award for Best Newcomer. Ishibashi's mother received the same award in 1976, marking the first time in Blue Ribbon's history that a parent and child received the same award.

On September 1, 2025, she moved her agency from Plage to Hirata International.

== Personal life ==
Ishibashi's older sister is a singer who releases music under the name Yuga. The two appeared together in a commercial for Uniqlo in 2017.

== Filmography ==
=== Films ===
Year	Title	Role	Notes	Ref.
2016	Night's Tightrope	Classmate		
2017	Parks	Sachiko		
2017	The Tokyo Night Sky Is Always the Densest Shade of Blue	Mika	Lead role	
2017	Misshi to Bannin	Sachi		
2017	Utsukushii Hito: Saba?	Marie		
2018	And Your Bird Can Sing	Sachiko	Lead role	
2018	Shottan, The Miracle	Sakiko Minami		
2018	Love at Least	Misato		
2018	The Nikaidos' Fall	Yuko Nikaido		
2019	21st Century Girl		Lead; anthology film	
2019	Strawberry Song	Chika Amano	Lead role	
2019	Tezuka's Barbara	Kanako Kai		
2019	The Promised Land	Noriko Tanaka		
2019	37 Seconds	Nurse		
2020	The Town of Headcounts	Beniko Kimura		
2020	Actress Hisako Harada	Herself	Documentary	
2021	Aristocrats	Itsuko Sagara		
2021	DIVOC-12		Lead role; anthology film	
2022	Prior Convictions	Midori Saitō		
2024	Who Were We?	Murasaki		
2026	Nagi Notes	Yuri Sakashita		
2026	Between Two Lovers	Junna		
2026	The Man Who Carried the Voices of August	Miyako Tachibana		

=== Television ===
Year	Title	Role	Notes	Ref.
2018	You May Dream	Sheena	Lead role	
2018	Half Blue Sky	Yoriko Hagio	Asadora	
2018	Dele	Sayaka Haruta	Episode 2	
2018	Suits	Hinako Machida	Episode 7	
2019	Yami no Haguruma		Television film	
2020	Tokyo Love Story	Rika Akana	Lead role	
2020	A Warmed Up Love	Riho Kitagawa		
2021	Pension Metsa	Mitsue	Episode 2	
2021	Zenkamono	Midori Saitō		
2022	The 13 Lords of the Shogun	Shizuka Gozen	Taiga drama	
2024	Swallows	Riki Oishi	Lead role	
2025	In Lilac Bloom, The Path to a Veterinarian	Natsuna Shizuhara	Miniseries	
2025	The Man Who Carried the Voices of August	Miyako Tachibana	Television film	
2026–27	Blossom	Tama Hano	Lead role; Asadora	

=== Stage ===
- Ginga Tetsudō no Yoru (ROGO, 2015)
- Gekirin (NODA MAP, 2016)
- Kosogi otoshi no akekure (BED&MAKINGS, 2019)
- Bibi wo mita! (KAAT, 2019)

=== Music video appearances ===
- "Furukotobumi" by Tamaki ROY (2017)

== Awards and nominations ==
Year	Organization	Award	Work	Result	Ref.
2017	30th Tokyo International Film Festival	Tokyo Gemstone Award	The Tokyo Night Sky Is Always the Densest Shade of Blue	Won	
2017	9th Tama Film Awards	Best New Actress	The Tokyo Night Sky Is Always the Densest Shade of Blue	Won	
2017	41st Fumiko Yamaji Movie Award	Best New Actress	The Tokyo Night Sky Is Always the Densest Shade of Blue	Won	
2018	39th Yokohama Film Festival	Best Newcomer	The Tokyo Night Sky Is Always the Densest Shade of Blue	Won	
2018	32nd Takasaki Film Festival	Best Newcomer	The Tokyo Night Sky Is Always the Densest Shade of Blue	Won	
2018	91st Kinema Junpo Awards	Best New Actress	The Tokyo Night Sky Is Always the Densest Shade of Blue	Won	
2018	60th Blue Ribbon Awards	Best Newcomer	The Tokyo Night Sky Is Always the Densest Shade of Blue	Won	
2018	Osaka Cinema Festival 2018	Best New Actress	The Tokyo Night Sky Is Always the Densest Shade of Blue	Won	
2019	73rd Mainichi Film Awards	Best Supporting Actress	And Your Bird Can Sing	Nominated	
2024	17th Tokyo Drama Awards	Best Actress	Swallows	Won	
