= Nagi Notes =

2026 Japanese film by Koji Fukada

- Japanese theatrical release poster
- Japanese: ナギダイアリー
- Directed by: Koji Fukada
- Written by: Koji Fukada
- Based on: Tōkyō Notes by Oriza Hirata
- Produced by: Terutaro Osanai; Atsuko Ohno
- Starring: Takako Matsu; Shizuka Ishibashi; Kawaguchi Waku; Kiyora Fujiwara; Sawako Fujima; Ron Mizuma; Shin Seo-gye; Kenichi Matsuyama
- Cinematography: Hidetoshi Shinomiya
- Edited by: Sylvie Lager
- Music by: Pei-Chin Lee
- Production companies: Tokyo Garage; Survivance; STAR SANDS; Momo Film Co; Hassaku Lab; Nathan Studios
- Distributed by: MK2 Films (France)
- Release dates: 13 May 2026 (Cannes); 25 September 2026 (Japan)
- Running time: 110 minutes
- Countries: Japan; France; Philippines; Singapore
- Language: Japanese

Nagi Notes (Japanese: ナギダイアリー, Hepburn: Nagi Daiari; lit. 'Nagi Diary') is a 2026 drama film written and directed by Koji Fukada, based on the play Tōkyō Notes by Oriza Hirata. It stars Shizuka Ishibashi ‌as Yuri, a Tokyo-based architect who travels to the rural village of Nagi, Okayama, to visit her friend and former sister-in-law, Yoriko (Takako Matsu), to pose for a ‌sculpture. It also stars Kenichi Matsuyama, Kawaguchi Waku and Kiyora Fujiwara.

The film had its world premiere in the main competition of the 2026 Cannes Film Festival on 13 May, where it competed for the Palme d'Or and the Queer Palm. It was theatrically released in Japan on 25 September 2026.

== Plot ==
In March, architect Yuri arrives in the town of Nagi, Okayama. Yuri is noticed by a middle school-aged boy named Keita, who brings up a portrait of her drawn by his best friend, the budding artist Haruki. Keita brings Yuri to her destination, the home of Yoriko, a sculptor and cow farmer who has recently moved back to Nagi from Tokyo. With the background of the Russian invasion of Ukraine, tensions are high in the town, which has a Japan Self-Defense Forces military base that holds constant live-fire exercises. It is revealed that Keita does not attend school because he only has Haruki as a friend, given that he moved here due to his father's service in the military. Yuri is in Nagi to reunite with Yoriko and be a model for her sculpture, the sister of her former husband, Masato, an architect based in Taiwan. Haruki's father arrives, a man named Yoshihiro Iguchi, who is the radio announcer for the town.

In the days following, the two boys bring Yuri around the town. Keita shows her his sketches of birds, and asks her whether or not she is in a romantic relationship with Yoriko, which she denies. He tells her that he is going to move in two weeks, as his father is being transferred to another military base after five years at Nagi. Haruki brings her to the Nagi Museum of Contemporary Art, telling her that his widowed father is in love with her, and that she should marry him. While exiting the museum, they run into Keita, who is disappointed and runs away, as Haruki had promised to go to the library to study with him that day.

Yoriko begins her sculpture of Yuri, starting from a clay model and moving onto wood. In their discussions, Yuri tells Yoriko that she separated with Masato because she did not feel free to design her own buildings and was trapped in the relationship in Taiwan, while Yoriko tells Yuri that she returned to her hometown because of crush she had on a girl at art school, who eventually married a man and then died, and because she wanted to take care of her parents.

Yoriko brings Yuri to climb a mountain, but she has to leave because three cows have escaped from her workplace. She calls over Yoshihiro, who brings her to an event at the museum showcasing camera obscuras, where the boys are also there. While looking through one, Keita confesses to Haruki that he likes him. The boys run away.

One day, Yoriko sees the girl whom she had a crush on. She wakes up, realizing that it was a dream. Yuri returns to the house with Yoshihiro, seeing that her clay statue has been destroyed, a part of Yoriko's creative process. She continues her discussions with Yoriko. Yuri goes to a ceremony where she burns dead grass, and freezes in the smoke until she is saved by Yoshihiro.

Haruki tells Yuri to come to his house under secrecy. Haruki and Keita tell her that they are now a couple and want to run away to Taiwan to get married, since gay marriage is illegal in Japan and their parents would not approve of their relationship. Yuri cautions them against this, saying that they should tell their parents and that they are acting prematurely. She falls asleep in the house, waking up to see Yoshihiro. She tells him that she has been in his room, and takes him up there - he has the portrait of her Haruki drew in Tokyo years ago above his bed. Yoshihiro tells her that he has seen her as simply a far-away model, not knowing that she would come, and he has fallen in love with the image of her. He drives her back to Yoriko's house.

Upon returning to Yoriko's house, Yuri walks in on Yoriko in a meeting with the boys. Not wanting them to make the same mistakes she made in her youth, she agrees to give them 100,000 yen to help them run away. She tells Yuri afterwards that they would come back soon, since the money is not enough. The boys go to the train station, where a storm starts. Yoriko and Yuri, seeing this, go to rescue them, but Yoshihiro and Keita's father get there first. Yoriko nearly crashes her car against the one cow that escaped she was not able to find, and they meet with the boys and their fathers, who give the money back to her.

A few days later, Yuri leaves Nagi behind. Seeing the boys on a bike in the fields, Yuri shouts out the window of the taxi, telling them to keep going.

== Cast ==
- Takako Matsu as Yoriko Endo
- Shizuka Ishibashi as Yuri Sakashita
- Kenichi Matsuyama as Yoshihiro Iguchi
- Kawaguchi Waku as Haruki Iguchi
- Kiyora Fujiwara as Keita Higashi
- Sawako Fujima
- Ron Mizuma
- Shin Seo-gye

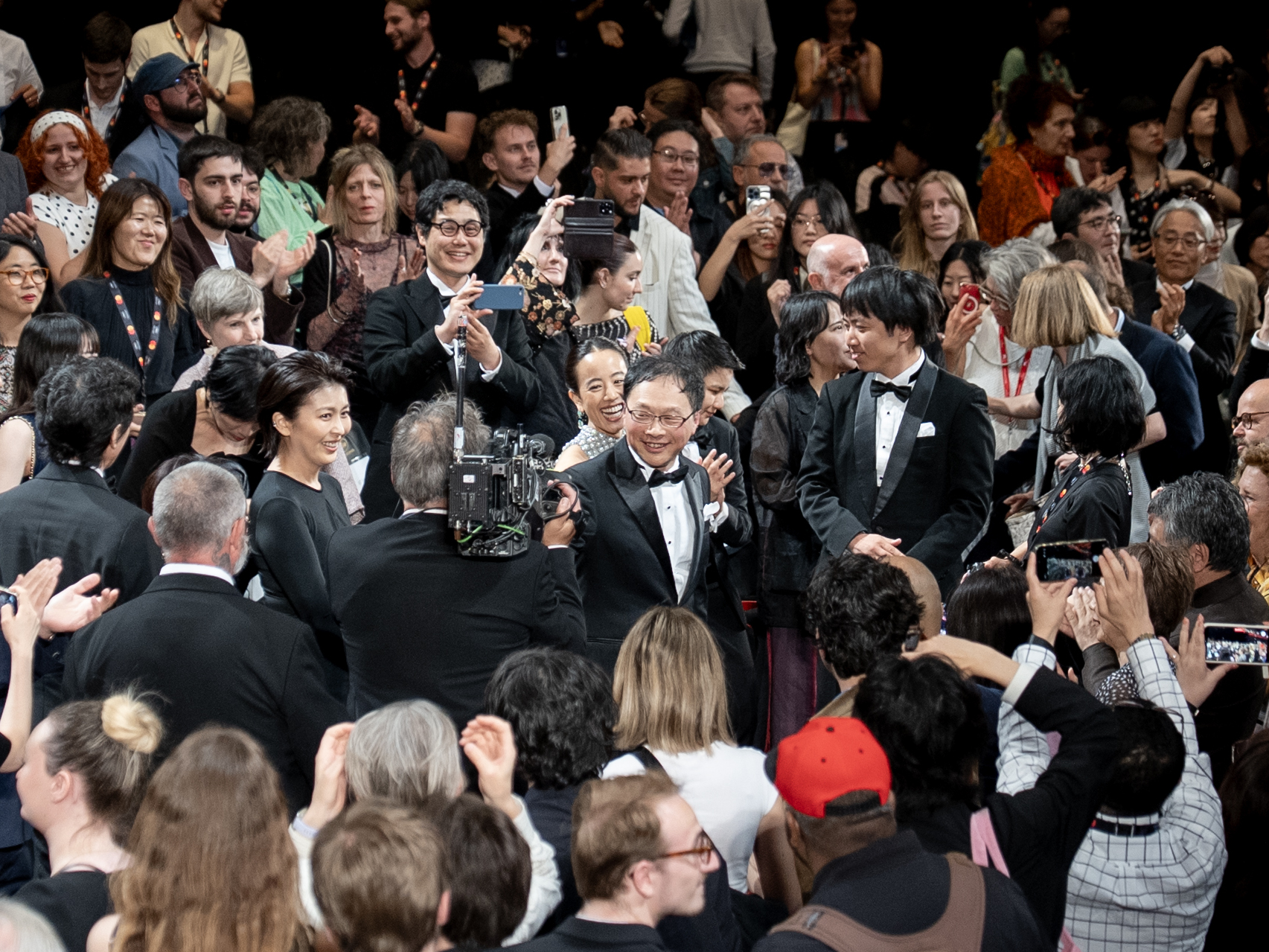
Fukada at the Nagi Notes standing ovation during the 2026 Cannes Film Festival

== Release ==
Nagi Notes premiered in competition at the 2026 Cannes Film Festival on 13 May, marking Fukada's first entry at the festival's main competition. A promotional clip from the film was released on 7 May 2026. In August 2026, Greenwich Entertainment purchased North American distribution rights, with plans to release in early 2027.

== Reception ==
On the review aggregator website Rotten Tomatoes, 92% of 25 critics' reviews are positive, with an average rating of 7.3/10. Metacritic, which uses a weighted average, assigned the film a score of 77 out of 100, based on 11 critics, indicating "generally favorable" reviews.
