= The Tokyo Night Sky Is Always the Densest Shade of Blue =

- Theatrical release poster
- Directed by: Yuya Ishii
- Screenplay by: Yuya Ishii
- Based on: Tahi Saihate
- Starring: Shizuka Ishibashi; Sosuke Ikematsu; Tetsushi Tanaka; Ryuhei Matsuda; Paul Magsalin; Mikako Ichikawa; Ryo Sato (actor); Takahiro Miura
- Cinematography: Yoichi Kamakari
- Edited by: Shinichi Fushima
- Music by: Takashi Watanabe
- Production companies: Little More; Film-Makers
- Distributed by: Tokyo Theatres
- Release date: February 13, 2017 (Berlin International Film Festival)
- Running time: 108 minutes
- Country: Japan
- Language: Japanese

The Tokyo Night Sky Is Always the Densest Shade of Blue (Japanese: 夜空はいつでも最高密度の青色だ, Hepburn: Yozora wa Itsu Demo Saikō Mitsudo no Aoiro da) is a 2017 Japanese romantic drama film directed by Yuya Ishii. It is based on a book of poetry of the same name written by Tahi Saihate and published in 2016.

The film premiered at the 2017 Berlin Film Festival.

== Plot ==
The Tokyo Night Sky Is Always the Densest Shade of Blue follows the relationship between two young adults, half-blind construction worker Shinji and nurse-cum-bartender Mika.

== Cast ==
- Shizuka Ishibashi as Mika
- Sosuke Ikematsu as Shinji
- Tetsushi Tanaka
- Ryuhei Matsuda
- Paul Magsalin
- Mikako Ichikawa
- Ryo Sato
- Takahiro Miura

== Music ==
The soundtrack features the song "New World" by The Mirraz.

== Reception ==
Reviewing the film after its showing at the Berlin Film Festival, The Hollywood Reporter's Deborah Young called The Tokyo Night Sky... "an earnest, at times poetic, drama about teen alienation". Writing for the South China Morning Post, James Marsh said the film "sets itself apart from more commercial romantic fare", but observed that "the narrative seems reluctant to bring its protagonists company".

Mark Schilling, reviewing the film for The Japan Times, found that the movie's "realism... and [its] poetic love story, with coincidence piled on incredible coincidence, make for an ungainly fit", also noting that "the dialogue, much of which seems to have been lifted from Saihate's work, often sounds like nothing anyone would actually say".
