= Yuriko Ishida =

Japanese actress and narrator (born 1969)

- 石田 ゆり子
- Born: October 3, 1969 (age 57); Nagoya, Aichi, Japan
- Occupation: Actress
- Years active: 1987–present
- Website: www.yuriko-ishida.com

Yuriko Ishida (石田 ゆり子 (石田 百合子), Ishida Yuriko; born October 3, 1969) is a Japanese actress and essayist from Nagoya. She was the Japanese voice of the title character San from the 1997 animated film Princess Mononoke. She is the older sister of Hikari Ishida, also an actress.

== Filmography ==
=== Films ===
- Gokudo no Onna-tachi: Saigo no Tatakai (1990), Shiori Ueki
- Boiling Point (1990), Sayaka
- Kanojo ga Kekkon Shinai Riyu (1990), Reiko
- Seishun Dendekedekedeke (1992)
- Haruka, Nosutarujii (1993)
- Pom Poko (1994), Okiyo (voice)
- Princess Mononoke (1997), San (voice)
- Himitsu (1999)
- Yomigaeri (2002), Reiko
- Milk White (2004), Yōko Asamura
- Year One in the North (2005), Kayo Mamiya
- Yokkakan no Kiseki (2005), Mariko Iwamura
- Fist of the North Star: The Legends of the True Savior (2007-2008)
- About Her Brother (2010)
- From up on Poppy Hill (2011)
- The Mourner (2015), Yukiyo Nagi
- Erased (2016), Sachiko Fujinuma
- Cafe Funiculi Funicula (2018)
- At the End of the Matinee (2019), Yōko Komine
- Hit Me Anyone One More Time (2019)
- Silent Tokyo (2020), Aiko Yamaguchi
- Hope (2020), Kiyomi Ishikawa
- A Morning of Farewell (2021), Tomoko Nakagawa
- Haw (2022), narrator
- Tokyo MER: Mobile Emergency Room, The Movie (2023), Azusa Akatsuka
- Tokyo MER: Mobile Emergency Room, Nankai Mission (2025), Azusa Akatsuka
- Tokyo MER: Mobile Emergency Room, Capital Crisis (2026), Azusa Akatsuka
- You, Like a Star (2026), Toko Hayashi
- The Tiger and Her Wings: The Movie (2027), Haru Inotsume

=== Television ===
- 101-kai me no puropozu (1991)
- Kimi no Tame ni Dekiru Koto (1992)
- Over Time (1999)
- Oyaji (2000)
- Eien no Ko (2000)
- Strawberry on the Shortcake (2001)
- Dekichatta Kekkon (2001)
- Bara no Jujika (2002) (mini)
- Dr. Coto's Clinic (2003)
- Pride (2004)
- Ganbatte Ikimasshoi (2005)
- Barefoot Gen (2007)
- Doctor's Affairs (2015)
- The Full-Time Wife Escapist (2016) - Tsuchiya Yuri
- BG: Personal Bodyguard (2018) - Aiko Tachihara
- Tokyo MER: Mobile Emergency Room (2021), Azusa Akatsuka
- The Days (2023)
- The Tiger and Her Wings (2024), Haru Inotsume

=== Dubbing ===
- Dolittle, Polynesia (2020)
