= Ryusei Yokohama =

Japanese actor and model (born 1996)

- 横浜流星
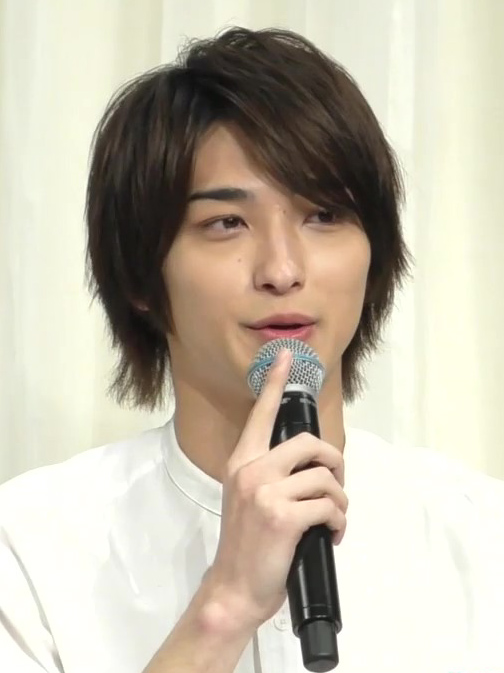
- Yokohama in 2019
- Born: September 16, 1996 (age 30); Yokohama, Kanagawa Prefecture, Japan
- Occupations: Actor; model; singer
- Years active: 2011–present
- Agent: Stardust Promotion

Ryusei Yokohama (横浜 流星, Yokohama Ryūsei; born September 16, 1996) is a Japanese actor, model, and former singer. He is best known for playing the role of the pink-haired Yuri Kyohei in the 2019 romantic comedy drama A Story to Read When You First Fall in Love, as well as Hikari Nonomura (ToQ 4gou) in the 2014 Super Sentai TV series Ressha Sentai ToQger.

== Early life and education ==
Yokohama Ryūsei was born on September 16, 1996, in Yokohama, Kanagawa Prefecture.

In March 2015, Yokohama graduated from a men's modelling course.

== Career ==
When he was a sixth grader, Yokohama was discovered by a talent scout while with his family on his first trip to the trendy Tokyo neighborhood of Harajuku. He is currently working under Stardust Promotion. He was a former member of the male talent group Ebidan, a group also produced by Stardust Promotion.

Yokohama's first appearance was at a commercial for Eiko Seminar. He served as a male model of the fashion magazine Nikopuchi through a public audition. Yokohama was voted as number 1 in Menmo. In the same year, he debuted in Kamen Rider Fourze. In 2013, Yokohama made regular appearances in the drama Real Onigokko The Origin.

In February 2014, he appeared in Ressha Sentai ToQger as Hikari/ToQ 4gou.

== Other activities ==
Yokohama's special skill is Kyokushin karate. In 2011, he won the 7th International Youth Karate Tournament for boys aged 13–14 in the under 55kg division.

== Filmography ==
=== Film ===
Year	Title	Role	Notes	Ref.
2016	Wolf Girl and Black Prince	Takeru Hibiya		
2019	Aiuta: My Promise to Nakuhito	Tōru Nomiya	Lead role	
2019	L-DK: Two Loves, Under One Roof	Reo Kugayama		
2019	Go Away, Ultramarine	Nanakusa	Lead role	
2020	Your Eyes Tell	Rui Shinozaki	Lead role	
2021	Your Turn to Kill: The Movie	Shinobu Nikaido		
2021	DIVOC-12		Lead role; anthology film	
2022	Usogui: Lie Eater	Baku Madarame	Lead role	
2022	Wandering	Ryo Nakase		
2022	Akira and Akira	Akira Kaidō	Lead role	
2022	The Lines That Define Me	Sōsuke Aoyama	Lead role	
2023	The Village	Yū Katayama	Lead role	
2023	One Last Bloom	Shōgo Kuroki	Lead role	
2024	The Parades	Shōri		
2024	Faceless	Kaburagi	Lead role	
2025	Kokuho	Shunsuke Ōgaki		
2025	Unreachable	Tenma Takasugi		
2026	You, Like a Star	Kai Aono	Lead role	
2026	Detective Conan: Fallen Angel of the Highway	Kazuaki Omae (voice)		

=== Television series ===
Year	Title	Role	Notes	Ref.
2019	A Story to Read When You First Fall in Love	Kyohei Yuri		
2019	Your Turn to Kill	Shinobu Nikaido		
2019	Marigold in 4 Minutes	Ai Hanamaki		
2020	Panda Judges the World	Naoki Morishima	Lead role	
2020	Cursed in Love	Tsubaki Takatsuki	Lead role	
2021	Why I Dress Up for Love	Shun Fujino		
2022	The Journalist	Ryo Kinoshita		
2022	DCU: Deep Crime Unit	Haruki Senō		
2023	Informa	Ainosuke Kawamura		
2024	Nevertheless: The Shapes of Love	Ren Kosaka	Lead role	
2025	Unbound	Tsutaya Jūzaburō	Lead role; Taiga drama	
2025	Last Samurai Standing	Toya Tenmyo	Episode 6	
2026	Lost 10	Ogoma	Lead role	

=== Television shows ===
Year	Title	Role	Notes	Ref.
2024	75th NHK Kōhaku Uta Gassen	Judge		

== Stage ==
=== Theatre ===
Year	Title	Role	Notes	Ref.
2013	Moonlight Rambler	Leonardo		
2013	Clock Zero: Final 1-second- A live Moment	The rebellious person		
2015	Samurai Shiroitora -Mononofu Shirokitora-	Ejiro Itou	Lead role	
2015	Super Danganronpa 2: Goodbye Academy of Despair: The Stage	Hajime Hinata / Izuru Kamukura	Lead role	
2016	Dark Hunter	Kyosuke Garyu		
2017	Biohazard the Experience	Karasawa	Lead role	
2017	A Moment to Remember (Reading drama)	Kosuke	Lead role	

== Awards ==
Year	Award	Category	Work(s)	Ref.
2019	12th Tokyo Drama Awards	Best Supporting Actor	A Story to Read When You First Fall in Love	
2019	TV Station Drama Award 2019	Best Supporting Actor	A Story to Read When You First Fall in Love	
2019	29th TV Life Annual Drama Awards	Newcomer of the Year	A Story to Read When You First Fall in Love	
2019	Nikkei Trendy – Person of the Year 2019			
2019	GQ Japan – Men of the Year 2019	New Generation Actor of the Year		
2019	32nd DIME Trend Award	Best Character Award		
2019	Yahoo! Search Award 2019	Grand Prize / Actor Grand Prize		
2020	43rd Japan Academy Film Prize	Newcomer of the Year	Aiuta: My Promise to Nakuhito, Cheer Boys!! and Go Away, Ultramarine	
2020	44th Elan d'or Awards	Newcomer of the Year	Himself	
2020	Seoul International Drama Awards	Asian Star Prize	Your Turn to Kill	
2020	Elle Cinema Award 2020	Elle Men Award	Your Eyes Tell	
2020	Line News Awards 2020	The Topic Person – Actor		
2022	47th Hochi Film Awards	Best Supporting Actor	Wandering	
2023	48th Hochi Film Awards	Best Actor	The Village and One Last Bloom	
2024	49th Hochi Film Awards	Best Actor	Faceless	
2025	79th Mainichi Film Awards	Best Lead Performance	Faceless	
2025	48th Japan Academy Film Prize	Best Actor	Faceless	
2026	47th Yokohama Film Festival	Best Actor	Faceless	
