= Gaku Hamada =

Japanese actor (born 1988)

- 濱田 岳
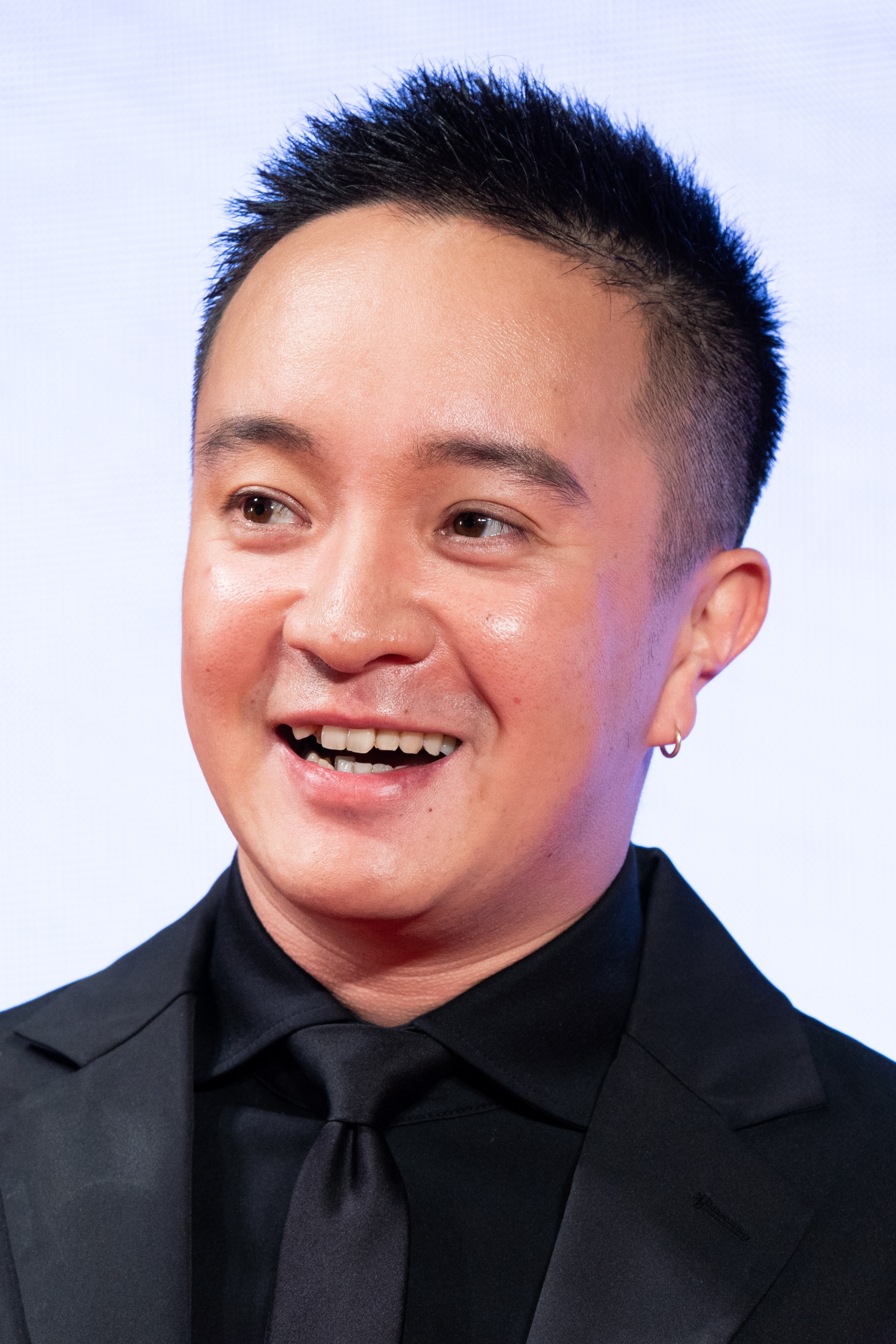
- Gaku Hamada at the 32nd Tokyo International Film Festival in 2019
- Born: 28 June 1988 (age 38); Tokyo, Japan
- Occupation: Actor
- Years active: 1998–present
- Agent: Stardust Promotion
- Spouse: Miyuki Koizumi (m. 2011)

Gaku Hamada (濱田 岳, Hamada Gaku; born 28 June 1988) is a Japanese film and television actor. He was a regular cast member of Fuji TV's Operation Love, appearing in all 11 episodes broadcast in 2007 and the 2008 special, and receiving an award for his role. He has made numerous other TV appearances.

== Filmography ==
=== Television ===
- Kinpachi-sensei 7 (2004), Kano Shintaro
- Gunshi Kanbei (2014), Kuriyama Zenzuke
- In Hand (TBS, 2019)
- Awaiting Kirin (2021), Kuroda Kanbei
- Kyojo 2 (2021), Nobuteru Toba
- Come Come Everybody (2021), Santa Tachibana
- New Nobunaga Chronicle: High School Is a Battlefield (2022), Kanbei Kuroda
- First Love (2022)
- Kamen Rider Black Sun (2022), Whale Monster
- Vivant (2023–26), Shōta Tōjō
- The Laughing Salesman (2025)
- Last Samurai Standing (2025), Kawaji Toshiyoshi
- Blood and Sweat (2026), Keisuke Takagi

=== Films ===
- A Good Husband (2010)
- The Supporting Actors: The Movie (2021), Himself
- Every Trick in the Book (2021), Horinouchi
- Shrieking in the Rain (2021), Kaneko
- What to Do with the Dead Kaiju? (2022), Masahiko Amane
- Deemo: Memorial Keys (2022), Mirai (voice)
- Tombi: Father and Son (2022)
- Homestay (2022)
- 7 Secretaries: The Movie (2022)
- Yudo: The Way of the Bath (2023), Gorō Miura
- Kyojo: Reunion (2026), Nobuteru Toba
- You, Like a Star (2026), Jushi Ueki
- Vivant: The Movie (2026), Shōta Tōjō

== Awards and nominations ==
Year	Award	Category	Work(s)	Result	Ref.
2020	23rd Nikkan Sports Drama Grand Prix	Best Supporting Actor	In Hand	Won	
