= You, Like a Star =

2026 film by Michihito Fujii

- Film poster
- Japanese: 汝、星のごとく
- Directed by: Michihito Fujii
- Screenplay by: Naoko Adachi
- Based on: Nanji, Hoshi no Gotoku by Yuu Nagira
- Produced by: Tomoya Nishino; Shota Imai
- Starring: Ryusei Yokohama; Suzu Hirose; Hokuto Matsumura; Machiko Ono; Yoshino Kimura; Yuriko Ishida; Hiroki Hasegawa
- Cinematography: Keisuke Imamura
- Edited by: Tatsuma Furukawa
- Music by: Takashi Ohmama
- Production companies: Toho Studios; Dragonfly Entertainment
- Distributed by: Toho
- Release date: October 9, 2026 (Japan)
- Running time: 135 minutes
- Country: Japan
- Language: Japanese

You, Like a Star (Japanese: 汝、星のごとく, Hepburn: Nanji, Hoshi no Gotoku; also translated as Thou Art Like a Star) is a 2026 Japanese drama film directed by Michihito Fujii, based on the 2022 novel of the same name by Yuu Nagira.

== Plot ==
At the age of 17, Kai Aono transfers to a high school on an island in the Seto Inland Sea, where he meets Akimi Inoue. Both struggle with difficult family circumstances, and they gradually fall in love. After graduating from high school, Kai moves to Tokyo to pursue his dream of becoming a manga artist, while Akimi remains on the island to care for her mother and takes a job at a local company. As they begin a long-distance relationship, the two gradually drift apart.

== Cast ==
- Ryusei Yokohama as Kai Aono
- Suzu Hirose as Akimi Inoue
- Hokuto Matsumura as Naoto Kuzumi, Kai's creative partner
- Anne Nakamura as Eri Nikaido
- Gaku Hamada as Jushi Ueki
- Yumia Fujisaki as Yui Kitahara, Sosuke's daughter
- Kairi Jo as Kei Ando (Photo only)
- Machiko Ono as Honoka Aono, Kai's mother
- Yoshino Kimura as Shiho Inoue, Akimi's mother
- Yuriko Ishida as Toko Hayashi
- Hiroki Hasegawa as Sosuke Kitahara

== Production ==
The film is based on Yuu Nagira's novel of the same name, which won the 20th Japan Booksellers' Award. After reading the novel, Ryusei Yokohama expressed his desire to adapt it into a film to director Michihito Fujii, whom he trusted, setting the project in motion. Yokohama and Suzu Hirose had previously appeared together in Wandering (2022), a film based on another novel by Nagira.

Filming for the film took place primarily in Imabari, Ehime Prefecture, and Tokyo. Yokohama revealed that he lost weight to 48 kilograms (106 lb) for the role.

== Accolades ==
Name of the award ceremony, year presented, category, nominee of the award, and the result of the nomination
Award	Date of ceremony	Category	Recipient(s)	Result	Ref.
Hochi Film Awards	December 2026	Best Picture	You, Like a Star	Pending	
Hochi Film Awards	December 2026	Best Director	Michihito Fujii	Pending	
Hochi Film Awards	December 2026	Best Actor	Ryusei Yokohama	Pending	
Hochi Film Awards	December 2026	Best Actress	Suzu Hirose	Pending	
Hochi Film Awards	December 2026	Best Supporting Actor	Hiroki Hasegawa	Pending	
Hochi Film Awards	December 2026	Best Supporting Actor	Hokuto Matsumura	Pending	
Hochi Film Awards	December 2026	Best Supporting Actress	Machiko Ono (Note: Also for The Ogre's Bride)	Pending	
Nikkan Sports Film Awards	27 December 2026	Best Film	You, Like a Star	Pending	
Nikkan Sports Film Awards	27 December 2026	Best Actor	Ryusei Yokohama	Pending	
Nikkan Sports Film Awards	27 December 2026	Best Actress	Suzu Hirose	Pending	
Nikkan Sports Film Awards	27 December 2026	Best Supporting Actor	Hiroki Hasegawa	Pending	
Nikkan Sports Film Awards	27 December 2026	Best Supporting Actress	Machiko Ono	Pending	
