= Bokuzō Masana =

Japanese actor

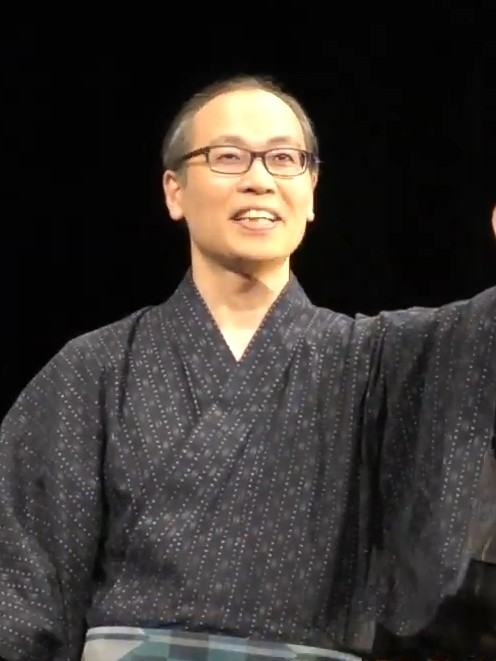
- Born: Fumio Masana; 11 August 1970 (age 56); Kawasaki, Kanagawa, Japan
- Occupation: Actor
- Years active: 1992–present

Bokuzō Masana (正名 僕蔵, Masana Bokuzō) is a Japanese actor.

Masana starred as Asao Konishi in L: Change the WorLd.

== Filmography ==
=== Films ===
- I Just Didn't Do It (2004), Mitsuaki Omori
- Happy Flight (2008), Fukuo Okamoto
- Hero (2015), Shūji Ido
- Hotel Royal (2020), Shinichi Honma
- The Man Who Failed to Die (2025), Tomohiro Moriguchi
- Stigmatized Properties: Possession (2025), Omiya
- Suzuki=Bakudan (2025), Tsuruku
- Samurai Vengeance (2026), Kyuzo
- Never After Dark (2026), police officer

=== Television ===
- Hero (2001–14), Shūji Ido
- The Way of the Househusband (2020), Miku's Father
- Unbound (2025), Matsuba-ya
- Lunacy (2026), Takeshi Mogi

== Awards and nominations ==
Year	Award	Category	Work(s)	Result	Ref.
2025	17th Tokyo Sports Film Awards	Best Supporting Actor	I Just Didn't Do It	Won	
