= Paris ni Saku Étoile =

2026 Japanese animated film directed by Goro Taniguchi

- Theatrical release poster

Japanese name
- Japanese: パリに咲くエトワール
Transcriptions
- Revised Hepburn: Pari ni Saku Etowāru
- Directed by: Gorō Taniguchi
- Screenplay by: Reiko Yoshida
- Story by: Gorō Taniguchi
- Starring: Ami Touma; Lina Arashi; Taichi Saotome; Mugi Kadowaki; Onoe Matsuya II; Akihiro Kakuta; Kenjiro Tsuda; Yoshiko Sakakibara; Akio Otsuka
- Cinematography: Tsunetaka Ema
- Edited by: Kiyoshi Hirose
- Music by: Takayuki Hattori
- Production company: Arvo Animation
- Distributed by: Shochiku
- Release date: March 13, 2026
- Running time: 119 minutes
- Country: Japan
- Language: Japanese

Paris ni Saku Étoile, (Note: Japanese: パリに咲くエトワール, Hepburn: Pari ni Saku Etowāru; lit. 'Étoile Blooms in Paris', the étoile in the title means "star" in French) also known as L'étoile de Paris en fleur, or Samurai Ballerina, is a Japanese original anime film directed by Gorō Taniguchi and produced by Arvo Animation. It is written by Reiko Yoshida, features character designs by Yū Yamashita based on Katsuya Kondō's original designs, and music by Takayuki Hattori. It premiered in Japan on March 13, 2026, distributed by Shochiku. The film's theme song is "Kaze ni Noru" (風に乗る; 'Ride the Wind') performed by Ryokuoushoku Shakai.

== Plot ==
The film is set in Paris during the early 1910s and follows two Japanese girls, Fujiko Tsuguta and Chizuru Sonoi. Fujiko aims to be a painter, while Chizuru is an aspiring ballerina. After meeting in Yokohama, the two meet again in Paris.

== Characters ==
Fujiko Tsuguta (継田 フジコ, Tsuguta Fujiko)
Voiced by: Ami Touma
Chizuru Sonoi (園井 千鶴, Sonoi Chizuru)
Voiced by: Lina Arashi
Ruslan (ルスラン, Rusuran)
Voiced by: Taichi Saotome
Olga (オルガ, Oruga)
Voiced by: Mugi Kadowaki
Chuu Wakabayashi (若林 忠, Wakabayashi Chū)
Voiced by: Onoe Matsuya II
Enzo (エンゾ)
Voiced by: Akihiro Kakuta
Shoichi Yajima (矢島 正一, Yajima Shōichi)
Voiced by: Kenjiro Tsuda
Kunie Sonoi (園井 邦枝, Sonoi Kunie)
Voiced by: Yoshiko Sakakibara
Chizuru's mother.
Kenkichi Sonoi (園井 健吉, Sonoi Kenkichi)
Voiced by: Akio Otsuka
Chizuru's father.
Kouzou Tsuguta (継田 光造, Tsuguta Kouzou)
Voiced by: Kensho Ono
Fujiko's brother.
Tomiko Tsuguta (継田 トミ子, Tsuguta Tomiko)
Voiced by: Yūko Kaida
Fujiko's mother.
Kingo Tsuguta (継田 金吾, Tsuguta Kingo)
Voiced by: Shinshū Fuji
Fujiko's father.
Jeanne (ジャンヌ, Jan'nu)
Voiced by: Kaori Nazuka
Maddie (マディ, Madi)
Voiced by: Jun Karasawa
Thomas (トマ, Toma)
Voiced by: Ayumu Murase

== Production ==
The film was produced as an independent film during the COVID-19 pandemic in Japan. Taniguchi chose Toma to play Fujiko because he wanted a character with a pure and charming voice. The film had been in production since at least 2018, when Kondō was approached by Karki Rajeev, Arvo Animation's representative director, to produce character designs for a film the studio was working on. Kondō initially declined the offer, only to accept after Rajeev insisted on at least doing some art.

== Manga adaptation ==
A manga adaptation, illustrated by French artist Zelihan, began serialization in Kodansha's seinen manga magazine Monthly Afternoon on November 25, 2025. The first tankōbon volume collecting its chapters was released on March 23, 2026.

=== Volumes ===
No.	Release date	ISBN
1	March 23, 2026	978-4-06-542797-2
1. "La représentation de ballet" (La représentation de ballet ~ バレーの公演); 2. "Recontre à Paris" (Recontre à Paris ~ パリでの出会い); 3. "Le cours de Naginata" (Le cours de Naginata ~ 薙刀教室); 4. "La ballerine Russe" (La ballerine Russe ~ ロシアのバレリーナ)
2	September 18, 2026	978-4-06-544793-2
5. "La danse de Chizuru" (La danse de Chizuru ~ 千鶴の踊り); 6. "Le déménagement" (Le déménagement ~ 引っ越し); 7. "La visite inattendue" (La visite inattendue ~ 予期せぬ訪問); 8. "Le départ" (Le départ ~ 出発); 9. "Temps d'Orage" (Temps d'Orage ~ 嵐の予感)

=== Chapters not yet in tankōbon format ===
10. "Contretemps" (Contretemps ~ 間が悪い)
11. "Le Festival" (Le Festival ~ 文芸祭)

== Accolades ==
This film won the Mr. M Audience Award for Best Feature Film at the 2026 Animafest Zagreb.
