= Lina Arashi =

Japanese model and actress (born 2004)

- Born: Lina Kahafizadeh; May 3, 2004 (age 22); Saitama Prefecture, Japan
- Occupations: Model; actress
- Years active: 2018–present
- Agent: Ten Carat
- Modeling information
- Height: 164 cm (5 ft 5 in)
- Hair color: brown
- Eye color: hazel

Japanese name
- Kanji: 嵐莉菜
- Hiragana: あらし りな
Transcriptions
- Romanization: Arashi Lina

Lina Kahafizadeh (リナ・カーフィザデー, Qafizadeh Rina; born May 3, 2004), known professionally as Lina Arashi (嵐 莉菜, Arashi Rina), is a Japanese model and actress. She is best known for playing the lead role of Sarya in My Small Land and as an exclusive model for the women's fashion magazine ViVi.

Arashi landed her first lead role in the coming-of-age film My Small Land (2022). The film was awarded the Amnesty International Film Award Special Mention at the 72nd Berlin International Film Festival and Arashi received the Kinema Junpo Award for Best New Actress.

== Early life and career ==
Lina Arashi was born on May 3, 2004, in Saitama Prefecture, Japan. Arashi is multiracial, as her mother is of Japanese-German descent and her father has roots from Iran, Iraq, and Russia. She has a younger sister and brother.

Arashi became a hot topic when her family went on a variety show called Made in Japan! on TBS TV, which aired in January 2016, and subsequently appeared in another episode broadcast in September of the same year.

On April 6, 2018, she appeared in the 8th issue of the manga magazine Young Gangan (Square Enix).

In 2019, she transferred from Motoko Inagawa Office to Ten Carat and changed her stage name to her real name, "Lina Kahafizadeh". In her stagename, the surname "Arashi" was taken from her father's first name (Arash Kahafizadeh). In November of the same year, she won the Miss iD 2020 Grand Prix.

On May 23, 2020, from the July issue of the fashion magazine ViVi (Kodansha), she became the magazine's exclusive model.

In February 2022, the film My Small Land, in which she plays the role of a Kurdish refugee, along with her real father, sister, and brother, was awarded the Amnesty International Film Award Special Mention at the 72nd Berlin International Film Festival. In October, Arashi walked the red carpet for the first time at the opening ceremony of the 27th Busan International Film Festival, to which the film was shown.

== Filmography ==
=== Film ===
Year	Title	Roles	Notes	Ref(s)
2022	My Small Land	Cholak Sarya	Lead role	
2025	The Boy and the Dog			
2026	Samurai Ballerina: L'étoile de Paris en Fleur	Chizuru Sonoi (voice)		

=== Television drama ===
Year	Title	Roles	Notes	Ref(s)
2022	My Small Land	Cholak Sarya	Lead role	
2023	18/40: Unbreakable Bond of Dreams	Ayaka Mitsumine		
2024	Acma: Game	Yukari Shikibe		
2025	Chihayafuru: Full Circle	Chieri Murata		

=== Commercials ===
- Bourbon sweets ice cream "White Lolita Ice" (February 2022) – Visual model
- P&G "Lenoir Reset" (October 2022 ) – Co-starred with Kenichi Takito

== Events ==
- Tokyo Girls Collection
  - 37th Mynavi Tokyo Girls Collection 2023 AUTUMN/WINTER (September 2, 2023, Saitama Super Arena)
  - CREATEs presents TGC KITAKYUSHU 2023 by TOKYO GIRLS COLLECTION (October 7, 2023, West Japan General Exhibition Center New Building)

== Awards ==
- 45th Yamaji Fumiko Film Awards – New Actress Award (My Small Land)
- 47th Hochi Film Awards – Newcomer Award (My Small Land)
- 36th Takasaki Film Festival – Best New Actor Award (My Small Land)
- 77th Mainichi Film Awards – Newcomer Award (My Small Land)
- 96th Kinema Junpo Awards – Best New Actress Award (My Small Land)
- 2023 Osaka Cinema Festival – New Actress Award (My Small Land)
