= Sena Nakajima =

Japanese actress and model

- 中島セナ
- Born: February 17, 2006 (age 20)
- Occupations: Actress; Model
- Agent: Etrenne

Sena Nakajima (Japanese: 中島セナ, Hepburn: Nakajima Sena; born February 17, 2006) is a Japanese actress and model.

== Career ==
In 2017, Nakajima was scouted and began her modeling career. She made her acting debut in The Bastard and the Beautiful World, an anthology film, appearing in the segment titled Shingo-chan and the Song-Eater. In 2021, she was cast as the heroine in the Pocari Sweat commercial. In 2022, she took on her first lead role in the film Longing for Color. In 2026, she co-starred with Ami Touma in the film The Girl at the End of the Line.

== Filmography ==
=== Film ===
Year	Title	Role	Notes	Ref.
2018	The Bastard and the Beautiful World		Segment: Shingo-chan and the Song-Eater	
2019	We Are Little Zombies	Ikuko		
2022	Longing for Color	Yui	Lead role	
2024	Blue Period	Kuwana Maki		
2026	The Girl at the End of the Line	Akari	Lead role	
2026	Undergirl	Yuri Ibuki	Lead role	
2027	Sleeping in the Red Earth	Kakae		

=== Television series ===
Year	Title	Role	Notes	Ref.
2022	Momo-san to 7-nin no Papageno		SP Drama	
2023	Dragons of Wonderhatch	Nagi	Lead role	
2025	Sai	Kitagawa Yuri		
2025	Hei no Naka no Biyoshitsu	Ichii Aya		

=== Music video appearances ===
Year	Artist	Song title	Ref.
2025	Riria	Aitoka	

== Commercials ==
- Pocari Sweat
- Mynavi Corporation 50th Anniversary Commemorative TV Commercial
- Kanebo
