= Kuranosuke Sasaki =

Japanese actor (born 1968)

- 佐々木 蔵之介
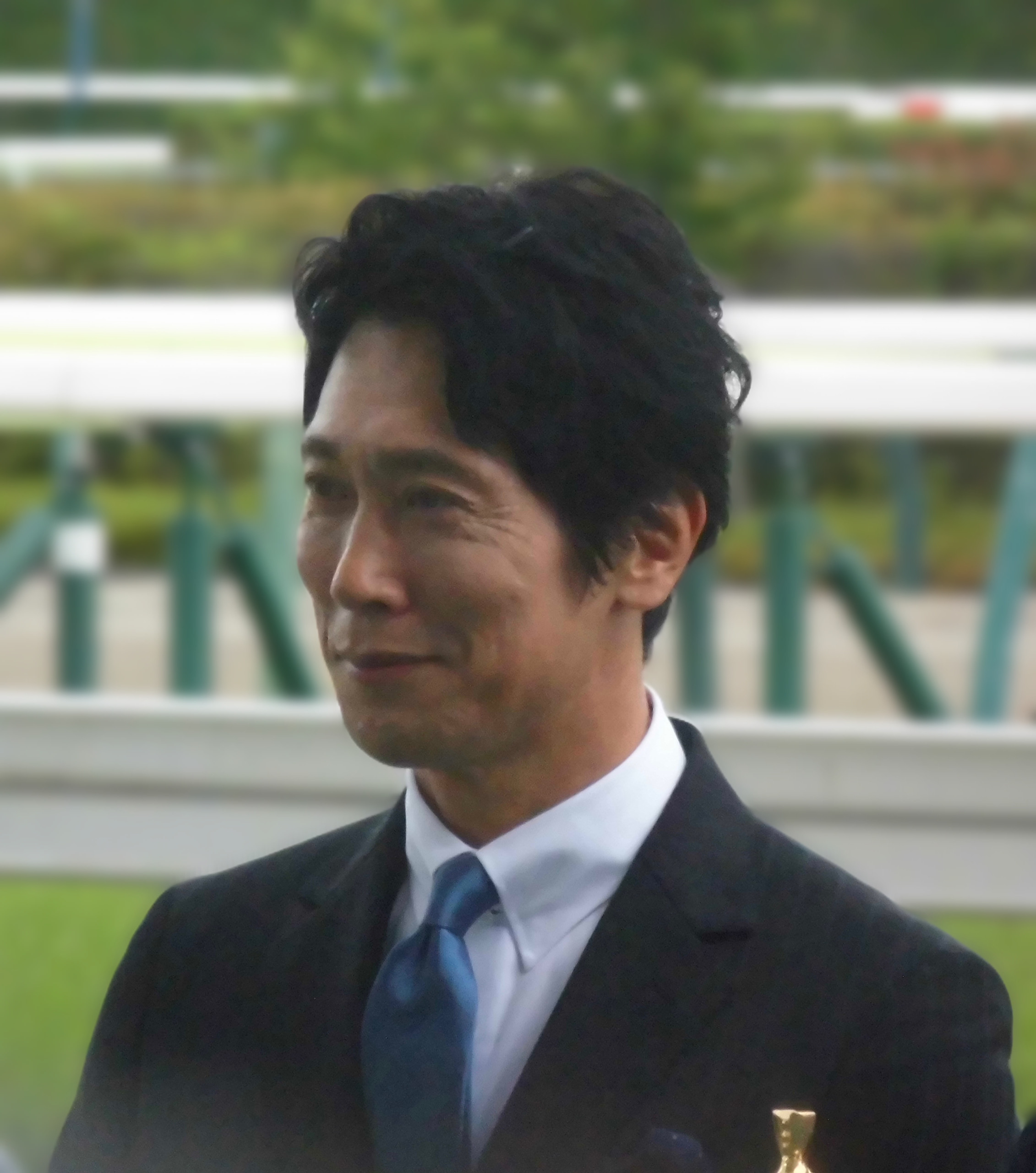
- Sasaki in 2023
- Born: Hideaki Sasaki; February 4, 1968 (age 58); Kyoto, Japan
- Occupation: Actor
- Years active: 1990–present
- Website: www.k-factory.net/profiles/kuranosuke-sasaki

Kuranosuke Sasaki (佐々木 蔵之介, Sasaki Kuranosuke; born February 4, 1968; real name Hideaki Sasaki 佐々木秀明, Sasaki Hideaki) is a Japanese actor, known primarily for his roles in Japanese television drama.

== Biography ==
He was born into a family of a sake brewery in Kyoto, Japan. After graduating from Kobe University and resigning from an advertising agency, he played an active part in a Japanese theatrical group called "Planet Pistachio," as a stage actor, from 1990 to 1998.

He later extended the range of activities to TV dramas and movies, and has played important roles in many works in Japan. He made his film debut starring in Mamiya Kyodai in 2006, and his TV series debut starring in Gira Gira in 2008.

When Sasaki was a freshman and received a phone call from his college company to decide on a stage name, his father suggested the name Kuranosuke, with a double meaning; for Kura, a sake cellar/brewery for their sake brewery, and for Ōuchi Kuranosuke, a famous historical drama role.

Sasaki's initial plan was to join the family business of sake brewing as the eldest son when he graduated from college. Learning sales strategy at an advertisement company was also part of his plan.

His family was not supportive when he aspired to be an actor, until he played a part in Audrey (NHK, 2000). His father sold sake named "Audrey", and then a premium junmai sake Hancho for a limited period while the TV drama was aired; Kuranosuke played a lead in Hancho.

Talking about his stage expressiveness, theatre scholar Octavian Saiu praised Sasaki for a unique ability to convey emotions through words as well as silences.

== Selected filmography ==
=== TV series ===
Year	Title	Role	Note	Ref
2000	Audrey	Kohtaro Miki	Asadora	
2001	Handoku!!!	Makoto Takano		
2003	Bijo ka Yajū	Hiroshi Kobukuro		
2003	The Great White Tower	Yūta Takeuchi		
2004	Last Present	Satoshi Oda		
2004–05	Rikon Bengoshi	Toshifumi Yanagida	2 seasons	
2005	Roomshare no Onna	Shūhei Sugita		
2005	M no Higeki	Akira Kubo		
2005	Kon-ya hitori no bed de	Shunsuke Kuzumi		
2006	Shimokita Sundays	Tsubasa Akutagawa		
2006	Boku no aruku michi	Hideharu Ohtake		
2006–14	Team Medical Dragon	Keisuke Fujiyoshi	4 seasons	
2007	Fūrin Kazan	Sanada Yukitaka	Taiga drama	
2007	Bambino!	Atsushi Kuwabara		
2008	Saitō-san	Tōru Mano		
2008	Shikaotoko Awaniyoshi	Shigehisa Fukuhara		
2008	Absolute Boyfriend	Gaku Namikiri		
2008	Monster Parent	Keigo Miura		
2008	Gira Gira	Kōhei Nanase	Lead role	
2009	Triangle	Ryō Akimoto		
2009	Orthros no Inu	Takayuki Sawamura		
2009	The Waste Land	Seiki Akitsu		
2009	Challenged	Keiichirō Hanawa	Lead role	
2009–13	Hanchō	Tsuyoshi Adumi	Lead role; 6 seasons	
2010	Himitsu	Heisuke Sugita		
2011	Boku to Star no 99 Nichi	Yamato Takanabe		
2016	Kaitō Yamaneko	Shūgo Sekimoto		
2017	Hiyokko	Shogo Makino	Asadora	
2019	Ieyasu, Edo wo Tateru	Ōkubo Tadayuki	Miniseries	
2019	Sherlock: Untold Stories	Reiji Etō		
2020	The Man Who Stood for Autonomy of Japan: Prime Minister Yoshida Shigeru	Hayato Ikeda	TV movie	
2020–21	Awaiting Kirin	Hashiba Hideyoshi	Taiga drama	
2023	My Home Hero	Tetsuo Tosu	Lead role	
2024	Dear Radiance	Fujiwara no Nobutaka	Taiga drama	

=== Movies ===
Year	Title	Role	Notes	Ref
2003	Bayside Shakedown 2			
2003	Densha Otoko	Hisashi		
2005	Summer Time Machine Blues	Kōtarō Hoseki		
2006	Kenchō no hoshi	Keita Sakurai		
2006	Mamiya kyodai	Akinobu Mamiya	Lead role	
2006	Rainbow Song	Shinsuke Higuchi		
2007	Tsukigami	Sahei Bessho		
2007	Tsubaki Sanjūrō	Kimura		
2008	700 Days of Battle: Us vs. the Police	Chūzai-san		
2008	After School	Masayuki Kitazawa		
2008	20th Century Boys : Beginning of the End	Fukubē		
2009	20th Century Boys 2 : The Last Hope	Fukubē		
2009	20th Century Boys 3 : Redemption	Fukubē		
2009	Daremo mamotte kurenai	Kōji Umezawa		
2010	Ōoku	Fujinami		
2011	Gaku	Masato Noda		
2013	A Boy Called H			
2014	Samurai Hustle	Naito Masaatsu	Lead role	
2015	Solomon's Perjury 1: Suspicion	Fujino		
2015	Solomon's Perjury 2: Judgment	Fujino		
2015	Till Death Do Us What?	Kōta Shimizu	Lead role	
2016	The Inerasable	Yoshiaki Hiraoka		
2016	Samurai Hustle Returns	Naito Masaatsu	Lead role	
2017	Flower and Sword	Maeda Toshiie		
2017	March Comes in Like a Lion	Kai Shimada		
2017	Hamon: Yakuza Boogie	Yasuhiko Kuwabara	Lead role	
2017	A Beautiful Star	Katsumi Kuroki		
2018	We Make Antiques!	Sasuke Noda	Lead role	
2018	Recall	Hirohisa Aizawa		
2019	Aircraft Carrier Ibuki	Toshiya Niinami	Lead role	
2019	Iwane: Sword of Serenity	Sasaki Reien		
2019	We Are Little Zombies			
2019	One Night	Michio Dōshita		
2020	The Memory Eraser	Takahara		
2020	We Make Antiques! Kyoto Rendezvous	Sasuke Noda	Lead role	
2021	The Woman of S.R.I. The Movie	Wataru Kagano		
2021	Akira Shimada	Narrator	Documentary	
2022	The Pass: Last Days of the Samurai	Koyama Ryōun		
2022	Homestay	Osamu Kobayashi		
2022	The Hound of the Baskervilles: Sherlock the Movie	Reiji Etō		
2023	We Make Antiques! Osaka Dreams	Sasuke Noda	Lead role	
2023	Shylock's Children	Michiharu Kuroda		
2023	Godzilla Minus One	Seiji Akitsu		
2024	My Home Hero: The Movie	Tetsuo Tosu	Lead role	
2025	The Final Piece	Tsuyoshi Ishiba		
2025	Emergency Interrogation Room: The Final Movie	Hiromichi Morishita		
2026	Kyoto Hippocrates		Lead role	
2026	Nameless	Kunieda		
2026	F(r)iction	Kato		
2026	Bayside Shakedown: N.E.W	Ikuto Kitaoka		
2026	Godzilla Minus Zero	Seiji Akitsu		
2026	4 Outs: Back to the Ballgame	Iwahashi		
2027	Samurai Hustle: Full Throttle	Naito Masaatsu	Lead role	

== Awards and nominations ==
Year	Award	Category	Work(s)	Result	Ref.
2015	38th Japan Academy Film Prize	Best Actor	Samurai Hustle	Nominated	

== Advertisements ==
=== Television ===
- 2016 Suntory non-alcohol beverage
- 2016 Kansai Electric Power Company
