= Detective Conan: Fallen Angel of the Highway =

2026 Japanese animated film by Takahiro Hasui

- Theatrical release poster
- Kanji: 名探偵コナン ハイウェイの堕天使
- Revised Hepburn: Meitantei Konan Haiwei no Datenshi
- Directed by: Takahiro Hasui
- Screenplay by: Takahiro Ōkura
- Based on: Case Closed by Gosho Aoyama
- Starring: Minami Takayama; Wakana Yamazaki; Rikiya Koyama; Megumi Hayashibara; Miyuki Sawashiro; Akio Ōtsuka; Nobutoshi Canna; Shinichiro Miki; Noriko Hidaka; Mei Hata; Ryusei Yokohama
- Music by: Yugo Kanno
- Production company: TMS/1st Studio
- Distributed by: Toho Co., Ltd.
- Release date: April 10, 2026
- Running time: 109 minutes
- Country: Japan
- Language: Japanese
- Box office: ¥13.70 billion

Detective Conan: Fallen Angel of the Highway (Japanese: 名探偵コナン ハイウェイの堕天使, Hepburn: Meitantei Konan Haiwei no Datenshi) is a 2026 Japanese animated mystery film directed by Takahiro Hasui. It is the twenty-ninth installment of the Case Closed film series based on the manga series of the same name by Gosho Aoyama, following the 2025 film One-eyed Flashback.

Detective Conan: Fallen Angel of the Highway is Wakana Yamazaki's final feature as the voice actress for Ran Mouri before her passing. The character will continue to be voiced by Akemi Okamura, who filled in for the role during Yamazaki's prior health hiatus

== Cast ==
Character	Japanese voice actor
Conan Edogawa	Minami Takayama
Ran Mouri	Wakana Yamazaki
Kogoro Mouri	Rikiya Koyama
Ai Haibara	Megumi Hayashibara
Chihaya Hagiwara	Miyuki Sawashiro
Jugo Yokomizo	Akio Ōtsuka
Jinpei Matsuda	Nobutoshi Canna
Kenji Hagiwara	Shinichiro Miki
Masumi Sera	Noriko Hidaka
Dr. Hiroshi Agasa	Kenichi Ogata
Ayumi Yoshida	Yukiko Iwai
Mitsuhiko Tsuburaya	Ikue Ōtani
Genta Kojima	Wataru Takagi
Minato Tateoki	Mei Hata
Kazuaki Omae	Ryusei Yokohama

== Promotion and release ==
Following a tease in August 2025, Fallen Angel of the Highway was revealed to be the 29^{th} Detective Conan feature film on December 2, 2025. The next day, a 30-second teaser trailer was released along with a new visual and details on the film, with Kanagawa prefecture police officer Chihaya Hagiwara, sister of Kenji Hagiwara, at the front and center. The film was released in Japan on April 10, 2026.

== Reception ==
=== Box office ===
The film has earned over ¥13 billion ($81 million USD), making it the highest-grossing among 2026 releases in Japan. It has now reached 27th place in the all-time domestic box office rankings, and ranks 4th among Detective Conan films, behind Detective Conan: Black Iron Submarine, Detective Conan: One-eyed Flashback and Detective Conan: The Million-dollar Pentagram.

=== Critical reception ===
Phil Hoad of The Guardian gave the film 3/5 stars and says, "With a torn-from-the-headlines conspiracy revolving around automated vehicles and big data, Fallen Angel of the Highway thrashes through the gears of another briskly enjoyable whodunnit."

The film received a 3.5-star rating from Robert Ewing of The People's Movies, who says "[its] ambition is a double-edged sword, leading to some of the most thrilling moments in the franchise but lacking the necessary bite to be one of the best."
