= Ami Touma =

Japanese actress (born 2006)

- Born: November 2, 2006 (age 20); Okinawa Prefecture, Japan
- Occupation: Actress
- Years active: 2021–present
- Agent(s): Dine and indy.

Japanese name
- Kanji: 當真 あみ
- Hiragana: とうま あみ
Transcriptions
- Romanization: Tōma Ami

Ami Touma (當真 あみ(とうま あみ), Tōma Ami; born November 2, 2006) is a Japanese actress.

== Filmography ==
=== Film ===
| Year | Title | Role | Notes | Ref. |
|---|---|---|---|---|
| 2022 | Hidaka-Kun, Who Is Always Reading Books That Seem Difficult | Saki | Lead role | |
| 2022 | Lonely Castle in the Mirror | Kokoro Anzai (voice) | Lead role | |
| 2023 | Water Flows Toward the Sea | Kaede Izumiya | | |
| 2023 | Immersion | Rin Kaneshiro | | |
| 2025 | Demon City | Ryo Sakata | | |
| 2025 | Taste and Tears | Yuka Arai | Lead role | |
| 2025 | Yukikaze | Sachi Hayase | | |
| 2025 | Strawberry Moon | Moe | Lead role | |
| 2025 | The Last Man: The Movie – First Love | Nagisa Ivanova (young) | | |
| 2026 | The Girl at the End of the Line | Kyoko | Lead role | |
| 2026 | Samurai Ballerina: L'étoile de Paris en Fleur | Fujiko Tsugita (voice) | Lead role | |
| 2026 | One Last Love Letter | Nazuna (young) | | |

=== Television ===
| Year | Title | Role | Notes | Ref. |
|---|---|---|---|---|
| 2022 | If My Wife Became an Elementary School Student | Rinne Izumo | | |
| 2022 | The Old Dog, New Tricks? | Mayu Misaki | Episode 5 | |
| 2022 | Medium | Natsuki Fujima | Episode 3 | |
| 2023 | Get Ready! | Mizumen Shimazaki | | |
| 2023 | Papa and Natchan's Lunch Box | Chinatsu Toyama | Lead role | |
| 2023 | Ōoku: The Inner Chambers | Ryu | Episode 9 & 11 | |
| 2023 | What Will You Do, Ieyasu? | Kamehime | Taiga drama | |
| 2023 | The Greatest Teacher | Aoi Kochiya | | |
| 2024 | Luca and the Flower of the Sun | Rosa (voice) | Lead role; TV anime | |
| 2024 | Sayonara, Maestro! | Amane Tanizaki | | |
| 2024 | Kekeke of the Day | Amane Katase | Lead role | |
| 2024 | The Town I Saw at the End | Nobuko Tamiya | Television film | |
| 2025 | Chihayafuru: Full Circle | Meguru Aizawa | Lead role | |
| 2025–26 | In Lilac Bloom, The Path to a Veterinarian | Ayaka Kajita | 2 seasons | |

=== Music video appearances ===
| Year | Song | Artist | Ref. |
|---|---|---|---|
| 2022 | "Merry-Go-Round" | Yuuri | |
| 2024 | "Aimoraimo" | Tuki | |

== Bibliography ==
=== Photobook ===
- Ami Touma 1st Photobook Ami (March 4, 2025, Shogakukan) ISBN 978-4-09-682485-6
