= List of Japanese films of 2024 =

This is a list of Japanese films that are scheduled to release in 2024.

== Highest-grossing films ==
The following is a list of the 10 highest-grossing Japanese films released at the Japanese box office during 2024.

Rank	Title	Gross
1	Detective Conan: The Million-dollar Pentagram	¥15.80 billion ($104.38 million)
2	Haikyu!! The Dumpster Battle	¥11.64 billion ($76.9 million)
3	Kingdom 4: Return of the Great General	¥8.03 billion ($53.05 million)
4	Spy × Family Code: White	¥6.32 billion ($41.75 million)
5	Last Mile	¥5.96 billion ($39.37 million)
6	Mobile Suit Gundam SEED Freedom	¥5.38 billion ($35.54 million)
7	The Floor Plan	¥5.07 billion ($33.49 million)
8	Till We Meet Again on the Lily Hill	¥4.54 billion ($29.99 million)
9	Doraemon: Nobita's Earth Symphony	¥4.31 billion ($28.47 million)
10	My Hero Academia: You're Next	¥3.60 billion ($23.78 million)

== Released ==
=== January–March ===
Opening		Title	Director	Cast	Ref.
J A N U A R Y	5	The Beast of Comedy	Kengo Takimoto	Amane Okayama, Reiko Kataoka, Honoka Matsumoto, Masaki Suda, Taiga Nakano	
J A N U A R Y	5	Estab Life: Bloody Escape	Gorō Taniguchi	Yūki Ono, Reina Ueda, Soma Saito, Yuma Uchida, Satsuki Yukino, Masayo Kurata	
J A N U A R Y	12	Kizumonogatari: Koyomi Vamp	Tatsuya Oishi	Hiroshi Kamiya, Yui Horie, Maaya Sakamoto, Takahiro Sakurai, Masashi Ebara, Miyu Irino, Hōchū Ōtsuka	
J A N U A R Y	12	Let's Go Karaoke!	Nobuhiro Yamashita	Go Ayano, Jun Saitō, Kyoko Yoshine, Kazuki Kitamura	
J A N U A R Y	12	In an Isolated Cottage on a Snowy Mountain	Ken Iizuka	Daiki Shigeoka, Ayami Nakajo, Amane Okayama, Nanase Nishino, Mayu Hotta, Junki Tozuka, Aoi Morikawa, Shotaro Mamiya	
J A N U A R Y	19	Golden Kamuy	Shigeaki Kubo	Kento Yamazaki, Anna Yamada, Gordon Maeda, Yūma Yamoto, Ryohei Otani, Shuntarō Yanagi, Katsuya, Mitsuki Takahata, Hiroshi Tamaki, Hiroshi Tachi	
J A N U A R Y	19	Best Regards to All	Yūta Shimotsu	Kotone Furukawa, Koya Matsudai	
J A N U A R Y	26	Mobile Suit Gundam SEED Freedom	Mitsuo Fukuda	Sōichirō Hoshi, Rie Tanaka, Akira Ishida, Nanako Mori	
J A N U A R Y	26	Love You as the World Ends: The Final	Shintarō Sugawara	Ryoma Takeuchi, Fumiya Takahashi, Mayu Hotta, Rihito Itagaki, Airu Kubozuka, Yūki Tachibana, Mario Kuroba	
J A N U A R Y	26	Take Me to Another Planet	Satoshi Kimura	Riko, Miwako Kakei, Ayumu Nakajima, Keito Tsuna, Miran, Akane Sakanoue	
J A N U A R Y	26	Silent Love	Eiji Uchida	Ryosuke Yamada, Minami Hamabe, Shuhei Nomura, Arata Furuta, Takuro Tatsumi, Kaito Yoshimura	
F E B R U A R Y	2	Kamen Rider 555 20th: Paradise Regained	Ryuta Tasaki	Kento Handa, Yuria Haga, Kōhei Murakami, Mitsuru Karahashi	
F E B R U A R Y	2	After the Fever	Akira Yamamoto	Ai Hashimoto, Taiga Nakano, Mai Kiryu, Koshi Mizukami	
F E B R U A R Y	2	Sin and Evil	Yūki Saitō	Kengo Kora, Shunsuke Daito, Takuya Ishida	
F E B R U A R Y	2	Ōmuro-ke: Dear Sisters	Naoyuki Tatsuwa	Emiri Katō, Chiwa Saitō, Rina Hidaka	
F E B R U A R Y	2	Demon Slayer: Kimetsu no Yaiba – To the Hashira Training	Haruo Sotozaki	Natsuki Hanae, Akari Kitō, Nobuhiko Okamoto, Kengo Kawanishi, Kana Hanazawa, Toshio Furukawa, Koichi Yamadera, Toshihiko Seki, Tomokazu Seki, Tomokazu Sugita, Kenichi Suzumura	
F E B R U A R Y	9	The Dancing Okami	Toshirō Saiga	Fuka Koshiba, Ruka Matsuda, Ryo Aoki, Win Morisaki, Rei Dan	
F E B R U A R Y	9	Don't Lose Your Head!	Hayato Kawai	Tsuyoshi Muro, Eita Nagayama, Haruna Kawaguchi, Kento Hayashi, Kazuki Kitamura, Akira Emoto	
F E B R U A R Y	9	All the Long Nights	Sho Miyake	Hokuto Matsumura, Mone Kamishiraishi, Kiyohiko Shibukawa, Haruka Imou, Ryō, Ken Mitsuishi	
F E B R U A R Y	9	Kaze yo Arashi yo	Tsuyoshi Yanagawa	Yuriko Yoshitaka, Eita Nagayama, Nao Matsushita, Takuma Otoo, Renji Ishibashi, Goro Inagaki	
F E B R U A R Y	9	Voice	Yukiko Mishima	Atsuko Maeda, Maki Carrousel, Show Aikawa, Ryōta Bandō, Maho Toyota	
F E B R U A R Y	16	Haikyu!! The Dumpster Battle	Susumu Mitsunaka	Ayumu Murase, Kaito Ishikawa, Yuki Kaji, Yuichi Nakamura, Koki Uchiyama, Satoshi Hino, Yuu Hayashi, Nobuhiko Okamoto	
F E B R U A R Y	17	Be My Guest, Be My Baby	Mitsuhito Shiraha	Koki Maeda, Razel Ichimiya, Stefanie Arianne, Misato Tanaka, Hiroshi Katsuno	
F E B R U A R Y	23	Ultraman Blazar the Movie: Tokyo Kaiju Showdown	Kiyotaka Taguchi	Tomoya Warabino, Himena Tsukimiya, Konomi Naito, Hayate Kajihara, Yuki Ito, Kisuke Iida, Shinya Okamoto, Haru Iwakawa, Ritsuto Morishima, Akira Ishida	
F E B R U A R Y	23	Matched	Eiji Uchida	Tao Tsuchiya, Daisuke Sakuma, Nobuaki Kaneko, Sei Matobu, Tetta Sugimoto, Yuki Saito	
F E B R U A R Y	29	The Parades	Michihito Fujii	Masami Nagasawa, Kentaro Sakaguchi, Ryusei Yokohama, Nana Mori, Tetsushi Tanaka, Shinobu Terajima, Lily Franky	
M A R C H	1	Doraemon: Nobita's Earth Symphony	Kazuaki Imai	Wasabi Mizuta, Megumi Oohara, Yumi Kakazu, Subaru Kimura, Tomokazu Seki	
M A R C H	1	Ya Boy Kongming!: Road to Summer Sonia	Shū Honma	Kaede Hondo, Ryōtarō Okiayu, Shōya Chiba, Jun Fukushima	
M A R C H	1	52-Hertz Whales	Izuru Narushima	Hana Sugisaki, Jun Shison, Hio Miyazawa, Karin Ono, Tōri Kuwana, Kimiko Yo, Mitsuko Baisho	
M A R C H	1	Horizon	Katsuya Kobayashi	Pierre Taki, Aiki Kuribayashi, Tomomitsu Adachi, Chikage Uchida, Marui Wan	
M A R C H	8	My Home Hero: The Movie	Takahiro Aoyama	Kuranosuke Sasaki, Kyōhei Takahashi, Asuka Saitō, Tae Kimura, Kenjiro Tsuda, Ryubi Miyase	
M A R C H	8	Play!	Tomoyuki Furumaya	Daiken Okudaira, Ouji Suzuka, Rio Yamashita, Masaki Miura, Fumiya Ogura	
M A R C H	8	Eiga Shimajirō Miracle Jima no Nanairo Carnation	Tomohiro Kawamura	Omi Minami, Miki Takahashi, Takumi Yamazaki	
M A R C H	8	Gold Boy	Shusuke Kaneko	Masaki Okada, Haru Kuroki, Jinsei Hamura, Rena Matsui, Kazuki Kitamura, Yōsuke Eguchi	
M A R C H	8	Kamen Rider Geats: Jyamato Awaking	Koichi Sakamoto	Hideyoshi Kan, Ryuga Sato, Yuna Hoshino, Kazuto Mokudai	
M A R C H	15	The Floor Plan	Jun'ichi Ishikawa	Shotaro Mamiya, Jiro Sato, Rina Kawaei, Miori Takimoto, Yuki Saito, Toshie Negishi, Masanobu Takashima, Kōji Ishizaka	
M A R C H	15	Dare to Stop Us 2	Jun'ichi Inoue	Arata Iura, Masahiro Higashide, Haruka Imou, Rairu Sugita	
M A R C H	15	Lovesick Ellie	Kōichirō Miki	Ryubi Miyase, Nanoka Hara, Takuya Nishimura, Mizuho Shiramiya, Kodai Fujimoto, Hironaga Otsuna	
M A R C H	22	April Come She Will	Tomokazu Yamada	Takeru Satoh, Masami Nagasawa, Nana Mori, Taiga Nakano, Ayumu Nakajima, Yuumi Kawai, Rie Tomosaka, Yutaka Takenouchi	
M A R C H	22	Dead Dead Demon's Dededede Destruction Part 1	Tomoyuki Kurokawa	Lilas Ikuta, Ano, Atsumi Tanezaki, Miyuri Shimabukuro, Miyu Irino	
M A R C H	22	Penalty Loop	Shinji Araki	Ryuya Wakaba, Yusuke Iseya, Rio Yamashita, Jin Dae-yeon	

=== April–June ===
Opening		Title	Director	Cast	Ref.
A P R I L	5	Toxic Daughter	Eisuke Naitō	Aimi Satsukawa, Sera Uehara, Himena Irei, Terunosuke Takezai	
A P R I L	12	Detective Conan: The Million-dollar Pentagram	Chika Nagaoka	Minami Takayama, Wakana Yamazaki, Rikiya Koyama, Kappei Yamaguchi, Ryō Horikawa	
A P R I L	12	Renji Himuro	Hiroyuki Tsuji	Yasukaze Motomiya, Mario Kuroba, Hiroto Honda, Yutaka Kyan, Yoshiyuki Yamaguchi	
A P R I L	12	Kuramerukagari	Shigeyoshi Tsukahara	Kanda Hakuzan, Tomoyo Kurosawa, Yu Serizawa, Setsuji Satō, Shō Karino, Raikō Sakamoto	
A P R I L	12	Kurayukaba	Shigeyoshi Tsukahara	Ayane Sakura, Yui Sakakibara, Takeo Ōtsuka, Yoshimasa Hosoya, Nanako Mori, Aoi Yūki	
A P R I L	19	Amalock	Kazuhiro Nakamura	Noriko Eguchi, Ayami Nakajo, Shōfukutei Tsurube II	
A P R I L	19	Blue Lock the Movie: Episode Nagi	Shunsuke Ishikawa	Nobunaga Shimazaki, Yuma Uchida, Kazuyuki Okitsu, Kazuki Ura	
A P R I L	19	The Yin Yang Master Zero	Shimako Satō	Kento Yamazaki, Shota Sometani, Nao, Masanobu Ando, Nijirō Murakami, Rihito Itagaki, Jun Kunimura, Kazuki Kitamura, Kaoru Kobayashi	
A P R I L	20	Tatsumi	Hiroshi Shōji	Yuya Endo, Kokoro Morita, Takenori Gotō, Kisetsu Fujiwara	
A P R I L	25	City Hunter	Yūichi Satō	Ryohei Suzuki, Misato Morita, Masanobu Ando, Fumino Kimura	
A P R I L	26	Evil Does Not Exist	Ryusuke Hamaguchi	Hitoshi Omika, Ryo Nishikawa, Ryuji Kosaka, Ayaka Shibutani	
A P R I L	26	Ohsama Sentai King-Ohger vs. Kyoryuger	Koichi Sakamoto	Taisei Sakai, Aoto Watanabe, Erica Murakami, Yuzuki Hirakawa, So Kaku, Masashi Ikeda, Rintaro Kawana, Ryo Ryusei, Syuusuke Saito, Yamato Kinjo, Akihisa Shiono, Ayuri Konno, Atsushi Maruyama, Robert Baldwin, Masayuki Deai	
A P R I L	26	Ohsama Sentai King-Ohger vs. Donbrothers	Hiroyuki Kato	Taisei Sakai, Aoto Watanabe, Erica Murakami, Yuzuki Hirakawa, So Kaku, Masashi Ikeda, Masato Yano, Kouhei Higuchi, Yuuki Beppu, Kohaku Shida, Totaro, Hirofumi Suzuki, Raizou Ishikawa, Yuya Tominaga, Amisa Miyazaki, Shinnosuke Takahashi	
M A Y	3	Swimming in a Sand Pool	Nobuhiro Yamashita	Saki Hamao, Reia Nakayoshi, Mikuri Kiyota, Sumire Hanaoka	
M A Y	3	18×2 Beyond Youthful Days	Michihito Fujii	Greg Hsu, Kaya Kiyohara, Joseph Chang, Shunsuke Michieda, Haru Kuroki, Yutaka Matsushige, Hitomi Kuroki	
M A Y	3	Buzzy Noise	Hiroki Kazama	Takumi Kawanishi, Hiyori Sakurada, Kai Inowaki, Shuntaro Yanagi	
M A Y	10	Samurai Detective Onihei: Blood for Blood	Tomohiko Yamashita	Matsumoto Kōshirō X, Nobuko Sendō, Yuri Nakamura, Shōhei Hino, Ichikawa Somegorō VIII, Kiichi Nakai	
M A Y	10	Trapezium	Masahiro Shinohara	Asaki Yuikawa, Hina Yōmiya, Reina Ueda, Haruka Aikawa	
M A Y	10	Undead Lovers	Daigo Matsui	Ai Mikami, Kanta Sato, Motoki Ochiai, Yuzu Aoki, Atsuko Maeda, Misuzu Kanno	
M A Y	10	Last Turn	Shinji Kuma	Koichi Iwaki, Sara Takatsuki, Shihori Kanjiya, Ryōsei Tayama, Yoshiko Miyazaki	
M A Y	10	Code Geass: Rozé of the Recapture	Yoshimitsu Ohashi	Kōhei Amasaki, Makoto Furukawa	
M A Y	10	Umamusume: Pretty Derby – Road to the Top	Chengzhi Liao	Kanna Nakamura, Sora Tokui, Hitomi Sasaki	
M A Y	17	Happiness	Tetsuo Shinohara	Airu Kubozuka, Aju Makita, Ai Hashimoto, Masayoshi Yamazaki, Yō Yoshida	
M A Y	17	Iris the Movie: Full Energy!!	Hiroshi Ikehata	Saki Yamakita, Yū Serizawa, Himika Akaneya, Yuki Wakai, Miyu Kubota (Iris)	
M A Y	17	Missing	Keisuke Yoshida	Satomi Ishihara, Tomoya Nakamura, Munetaka Aoki, Yusaku Mori, Karin Ono, Gaku Hosokawa	
M A Y	17	Bushido	Kazuya Shiraishi	Tsuyoshi Kusanagi, Kaya Kiyohara, Taishi Nakagawa, Eita Okuno, Takuma Otoo, Masachika Ichimura, Takumi Saitoh, Kyoko Koizumi, Jun Kunimura	
M A Y	17	The Women in the Lakes	Tatsushi Ōmori	Sota Fukushi, Marika Matsumoto, Momoko Fukuchi, Naomi Zaizen, Yoshiko Mita, Tadanobu Asano	
M A Y	24	Dangerous Cops: Home Coming	Hiroto Hara	Hiroshi Tachi, Kyōhei Shibata, Atsuko Asano, Tōru Nakamura, Tao Tsuchiya	
M A Y	24	Umamusume: Pretty Derby – Beginning of a New Era	Ken Yamamoto	Yuri Fujimoto, Sumire Uesaka, Yui Ogura, Haruna Fukushima	
M A Y	24	The Crescent Moon with Cats	Naho Kamimura	Yumi Adachi, Kana Kurashina, Keisuke Watanabe	
M A Y	24	My Oni Girl	Tomotaka Shibayama	Kensho Ono, Miyu Tomita, Shintarō Asanuma, Aya Yamane, Tomoko Shiota, Shirō Saitō	
M A Y	24	Dead Dead Demon's Dededede Destruction Part 2	Tomoyuki Kurokawa	Lilas Ikuta, Ano, Atsumi Tanezaki, Miyuri Shimabukuro, Miyu Irino	
M A Y	24	Naomi: Reversed	Tadaaki Horai	Yuki Masuda, Yuta Hayashi	
M A Y	24	School Meals Time: Road to Ikameshi	Shinya Ayabe	Hayato Ichihara, Yuno Ohara, Taiki Tazawa, Eishin, Maiko Itō, Naomasa Musaka, Ken Ishiguro, Atsuko Takahata, Kazuki Kosakai	
M A Y	31	Teasing Master Takagi-san Movie	Rikiya Imaizumi	Mei Nagano, Fumiya Takahashi, Yōsuke Eguchi, Jin Suzuki, Yuna Taira	
M A Y	31	The Ohara Family Rhapsody	Hideyuki Katsuki	Atsuko Takahata, Isao Hashizume, Ayame Goriki, Kyōzō Nagatsuka	
M A Y	31	Who Were We?	Tetsuya Tomina	Nana Komatsu, Ryuhei Matsuda, Shinobu Otake, Kataoka Sennosuke, Shizuka Ishibashi, Min Tanaka	
M A Y	31	Confession	Nobuhiro Yamashita	Toma Ikuta, Yang Ik-june, Nao	
J U N E	7	A Girl Named Ann	Yu Irie	Yuumi Kawai, Jiro Sato, Goro Inagaki, Aoba Kawai, Yuriko Hirooka, Akari Hayami	
J U N E	7	Stay Mum	Kosai Sekine	Anne Watanabe, Tōma Nakasu, Aimi Satsukawa, Yoshi Sakou, Masanobu Ando, Eiji Okuda	
J U N E	7	Worlds Apart	Natsuki Seta	Yui Aragaki, Ikoi Hayase, Kōji Seto, Kaho, Rina Komiyama	
J U N E	7	Tomorrow in the Finder	Jun Akiyama	Sei Hiraizumi, Masaya Sano, Yoshie Ichige, Hitomi Kuroki, Kōichi Satō, Riku Kashima	
J U N E	7	This Man	Tomojirō Amano	Arisa Deguchi, Minehiro Kinomoto, Kanji Tsuda, Tetsu Watanabe	
J U N E	7	Tea for Three	Kentarō Ōtani	Nao Matsushita, Yosuke Sugino, Ryuta Yamamura	
J U N E	14	Dear Family	Sho Tsukikawa	Yo Oizumi, Miho Kanno, Riko Fukumoto, Rina Kawaei, Miu Arai, Hokuto Matsumura, Ken Mitsuishi	
J U N E	14	Rabbits Kingdom the Movie	Masayoshi Ozaki	Yūki Kaji, Kōsuke Toriumi, Toshiki Masuda, Tomoaki Maeno, Yoshimasa Hosoya, Kenn, Shouta Aoi, Wataru Hatano	
J U N E	14	A Few Moments of Cheers	Popurika	Natsuki Hanae, Mariya Ise, Kei Sugawara, Yuma Uchida, Fuka Izumi	
J U N E	21	90 Years Old – So What?	Tetsu Maeda	Mitsuko Kusabue, Toshiaki Karasawa, Miki Maya, Sawako Fujima, Tae Kimura, Runa Nakashima	
J U N E	21	Sakura	Hiroto Hara	Hana Sugisaki, Riku Hagiwara, Kōsuke Toyohara, Ken Yasuda	
J U N E	21	Ōmuro-ke: Dear Friends	Naoyuki Tatsuwa	Emiri Katō, Chiwa Saitō, Rina Hidaka	
J U N E	27	Drawing Closer	Takahiro Miki	Ren Nagase, Natsuki Deguchi, Mayuu Yokota, Fumino Kimura, Nene Otsuka, Tōru Nakamura, Yasuko Matsuyuki	
J U N E	28	Secret: A Hidden Score	Hayato Kawai	Taiga Kyomoto, Kotone Furukawa, Mayuu Yokota, Ryōta Miura, Ryōtarō Sakaguchi	
J U N E	28	Look Back	Kiyotaka Oshiyama	Yuumi Kawai, Mizuki Yoshida	
J U N E	28	Anpanman: Baikinman and Lulun in the Picture Book	Jun Kawagoe	Keiko Toda, Ryūsei Nakao, Aya Ueto, Takashi Okamura	
J U N E	29	Promised Land	Masashi Iijima	Rairu Sugita, Kanichiro, Masaki Miura, Fusako Urabe, Kiyohiko Shibukawa, Kaoru Kobayashi	

=== July–September ===
Opening		Title	Director	Cast	Ref.
J U L Y	5	Sensei's Pious Lie	Kōichirō Miki	Nao, Soya Igari, Ayaka Miyoshi, Shunsuke Kazama	
J U L Y	12	Kingdom 4: Return of the Great General	Shinsuke Sato	Kento Yamazaki, Ryo Yoshizawa, Kanna Hashimoto, Nana Seino, Yuki Yamada, Amane Okayama, Takahiro Miura, Yuko Araki, Eri Murakawa, Jun Kaname, Yūsuke Hirayama, Koji Yamamoto, Shun Oguri, Kōji Kikkawa, Takao Osawa	
J U L Y	12	To Mom, With Love	Ryōsuke Hashiguchi	Noriko Eguchi, Chika Uchida, Kotone Furukawa, Fall-gachi Aoyama	
J U L Y	12	Great Absence	Kei Chikaura	Mirai Moriyama, Tatsuya Fuji, Yōko Maki, Hideko Hara	
J U L Y	19	Be Forever Yamato: Rebel 3199	Harutoshi Fukui, Naomichi Yamato	Daisuke Ono, Houko Kuwashima, Hōchū Ōtsuka, Kenichi Suzumura, Tasuku Hatanaka	
J U L Y	19	Gekijōban SutoPuri Hajimari no Monogatari: Strawberry School Festival!!!!	Naoki Matsūra	Rinu, Root, Koron, Satomi, Gel, Nanamori	
J U L Y	19	Ghost Cat Anzu	Yoko Kuno, Nobuhiro Yamashita	Mirai Moriyama, Noa Goto, Takataka Aoki, Miwako Ichikawa, Keiichi Suzuki, Shingo Mizusawa	
J U L Y	19	Run for Money the Movie: Tokyo Mission	Masaki Nishiura	Takumi Kawanishi, Sota Nakajima, Shoya Kimata, Aomi Kaneshiro, Reiya Seguchi, Daiki Sato	
J U L Y	19	Sana: Let Me Hear	Takashi Shimizu	Nagisa Shibuya, Ikoi Hayase, Soma Santoki, Towa Araki, Maya Imamori, Makita Sports, Shota Sometani	
J U L Y	26	What If Shogun Ieyasu Tokugawa Was to Become the Prime Minister	Hideki Takeuchi	Minami Hamabe, Mansai Nomura, Eiji Akaso, Gackt, Naoto Takenaka, Masahiro Takashima, Noriko Eguchi, Alisa Mizuki, Shinya Kote, Mijika Nagai, Tetsuhiro Ikeda	
J U L Y	26	Mononoke: The Movie	Kenji Nakamura	Hiroshi Kamiya, Tomoyo Kurosawa, Aoi Yūki, Mami Koyama	
J U L Y	26	DitO	Takashi Yūki	Takashi Yūki, Momoko Tanabe, Machiko Ono, Mon Confiado, Buboy Villar, Manny Pacquiao	
J U L Y	26	Brush of the God	Keizō Murase	Rio Suzuki, Takeru Narahara, Yumiko Shaku, Takumi Saitoh, Shirō Sano	
J U L Y	26	Kamen Rider Gotchard: The Future Daybreak	Ryuta Tasaki	Junsei Motojima, Reiyo Matsumoto, Yasunari Fujibayashi, Seiichiro Nagata, Oto Abe, Rikiya Tomizono, Rikuto Kumaki, Kanji Ishimaru, Kenta Kamakari, Itono Okita, Kanon Miyahara, Alisa Sakamaki, Amon Kabe, Saki Fukuda,	
J U L Y	26	Bakuage Sentai Boonboomger GekijoBoon! Promise the Circuit	Shojiro Nakazawa	Haruhi Iuchi, Yuki Hayama, Miu Suzuki, Ryu Saito, Satoru Soma, Yu Miyazawa, Hashiyasume Atsuko, Rica Matsumoto, Natsuki Hanae, Junichi Suwabe, Nana Mizuki, Sumire Morohoshi	
A U G U S T	2	Honeko Akabane's Bodyguards	Junichi Ishikawa	Raul, Natsuki Deguchi, Daiken Okudaira, Hikaru Takahashi, Tao Tsuchiya, Kenichi Endō	
A U G U S T	2	My Hero Academia: You're Next	Tensai Okamura	Daiki Yamashita, Nobuhiko Okamoto, Ayane Sakura, Yuki Kaji, Kaito Ishikawa	
A U G U S T	9	Bocchi the Rock! Re:Re:	Keiichiro Saito	Yoshino Aoyama, Sayumi Suzushiro, Saku Mizuno, Ikumi Hasegawa	
A U G U S T	9	Crayon Shin-chan the Movie: Our Dinosaur Diary	Shinobu Sasaki	Yumiko Kobayashi, Miki Narahashi, Toshiyuki Morikawa, Satomi Kōrogi, Mari Mashiba, Takumi Kitamura, Shunsuke Ito, Yu Hatanaka	
A U G U S T	9	Blue Period	Kentarō Hagiwara	Gordon Maeda, Fumiya Takahashi, Rihito Itagaki, Hiyori Sakurada, Sena Nakajima, Ikuho Akiya, Hikari Ishida, Noriko Eguchi, Hiroko Yakushimaru	
A U G U S T	9	The Scoop	Keiichi Kobayashi	Karin Fujiyoshi, Akari Takaishi, Rinka Kumada, Tomo Nakai	
A U G U S T	16	Zegapain STA	Masami Shinoda	Shintarō Asanuma, Kana Hanazawa, Ayako Kawasumi, Tomohiro Tsuboi, Marina Inoue, Hiroyuki Yoshino	
A U G U S T	16	Touken Ranbu Dōden: Chikashi Samuraira Umonora	Kazuya Ichikawa	Tarusuke Araki, Tomoaki Maeno	
A U G U S T	17	A Samurai in Time	Jun'ichi Yasuda	Makiya Yamaguchi, Norimasa Fuke, Yūno Sakura, Rantarō Mine	
A U G U S T	23	We Don't Know Love Yet	Mai Sakai	Ryusei Onishi, Airu Kubozuka, Nagisa Saitō, Riko, Sōya Igari, Sara Shida	
A U G U S T	23	Last Mile	Ayuko Tsukahara	Hikari Mitsushima, Masaki Okada, Sadao Abe, Dean Fujioka, Shōhei Hino, Kōji Ōkura, Yoshi Sakou, Satomi Ishihara, Arata Iura, Yutaka Matsushige, Go Ayano, Gen Hoshino	
A U G U S T	23	The Box Man	Gakuryū Ishii	Masatoshi Nagase, Tadanobu Asano, Ayana Shiramoto, Koichi Sato	
A U G U S T	23	House of Sayuri	Kōji Shiraishi	Ryōka Minamide, Hana Kondo, Toshie Negishi, Zen Kajihara, Fusako Urabe, Kitarō, Kokoro Morita, Rei Inomata	
A U G U S T	30	The Colors Within	Naoko Yamada	Sayu Suzukawa, Akari Takaishi, Taisei Kido, Keiko Toda, Yui Aragaki	
A U G U S T	30	Rude to Love	Yukihiro Morigaki	Noriko Eguchi, Kotaro Koizumi, Fumika Baba, Jun Fubuki	
A U G U S T	30	The Three Young-Men in Midnight: The Movie 2	Takeshi Moriya	Ryuta Sato, Yoshinori Okada, Takashi Tsukamoto, Daisuke Kobayashi, Nashiko Momotsuki, Tamae Ando	
S E P T E M B E R	6	A Conviction of Marriage	Yukihiko Tsutsumi	Yuya Yagira, Yuina Kuroshima, Taishi Nakagawa, Rei Maruyama, Tatekawa Shiraku, Seiji Fukushi, Hiroki Konno, Masachika Ichimura	
S E P T E M B E R	6	Desert of Namibia	Yōko Yamanaka	Yuumi Kawai, Daichi Kaneko, Kanichiro, Makiko Watanabe, Keisuke Horibe, Yuzumi Shintani	
S E P T E M B E R	13	All About Suomi	Kōki Mitani	Masami Nagasawa, Hidetoshi Nishijima, Tori Matsuzaka, Kenichi Endō, Takashi Kobayashi, Bandō Yajūrō, Kōji Seto, Junki Tozuka, Emma Miyazawa	
S E P T E M B E R	13	Wonderful PreCure!	Naoki Miyahara	Maria Naganawa, Atsumi Tanezaki, Satsumi Matsuda, Reina Ueda	
S E P T E M B E R	13	Sisam	Hiroyuki Nakao	Kanichiro, Takahiro Miura, Masato Wada, Ryōta Bandō, Takahiro Hirano, Sahel Rosa	
S E P T E M B E R	13	The Quiet Yakuza 2: Part 1	Kiyoto Naruse	Kentaro Ito, Miwako Kakei, Motoki Fukami, Yasukaze Motomiya, Hiroki Miyake, Yoshiyuki Tsubokura, Mariko Tsutsui	
S E P T E M B E R	13	My Sunshine	Hiroshi Okuyama	Keitatsu Koshiyama, Kiara Nakanishi, Sosuke Ikematsu, Ryuya Wakaba	
S E P T E M B E R	13	This Video Cannot Be Played: The Movie	Kōhei Taniguchi	Shō Kaga, Sōya Kaya, Masanari Wada, Koji Abe	
S E P T E M B E R	20	Who's Gone	Itaru Mizuno	Fumiya Takahashi, Kei Tanaka, Kana Kita, Maki Sakai, Yoshihiko Hakamada, Rinko Kikuchi, Shota Sometani	
S E P T E M B E R	20	Living in Two Worlds	Mipo O	Ryo Yoshizawa, Akiko Oshidari, Akito Imai, Yūsuke Santamaria, Setsuko Karasuma, Denden	
S E P T E M B E R	27	Arrogance and Virtue	Kentarō Hagiwara	Taisuke Fujigaya, Nao, Yūki Kura, Nanami Sakuraba, Kenji Anan, Yoshiko Miyazaki, Naomi Nishida, Bibari Maeda	
S E P T E M B E R	27	Cloud	Kiyoshi Kurosawa	Masaki Suda, Kotone Furukawa, Daiken Okudaira, Amane Okayama, Yoshiyoshi Arakawa, Masataka Kubota	
S E P T E M B E R	27	The Quiet Yakuza 2: Part 2	Kiyoto Naruse	Kentaro Ito, Miwako Kakei, Motoki Fukami, Yasukaze Motomiya, Hiroki Miyake, Yoshiyuki Tsubokura, Mariko Tsutsui	
S E P T E M B E R	27	Previously Saved Version	Kei Ishikawa	Hideaki Itō, Yuko Araki, Long Mizuma, Jeab-Lalana Kongtoranin	
S E P T E M B E R	27	BanG Dream! It's MyGO!!!!! Spring Sunshine, Lost Cat	Kodai Kakimoto	Hina Yōmiya, Hina Aoki, Rin Tateishi, Mika Kohinata, Coco Hayashi	
S E P T E M B E R	27	Baby Assassins: Nice Days	Yugo Sakamoto	Akari Takaishi, Saori Izawa, Atomu Mizuishi, Atsuko Maeda, Sosuke Ikematsu	

=== October–December ===
Opening		Title	Director	Cast	Ref.
O C T O B E R	4	Fureru	Tatsuyuki Nagai	Ren Nagase, Ryota Bando, Kentaro Maeda, Haruka Shiraishi, Manaka Iwami, Sarutoki Minagawa, Kenjiro Tsuda	
O C T O B E R	4	Documentary of Baby Assassins	Akihiro Takahashi	Akari Takaishi, Saori Izawa, Yugo Sakamoto, Sosuke Ikematsu, Atsuko Maeda, Atomu Mizuishi, Tomo Nakai, Mondo Otani, Yusuke Suzuki	
O C T O B E R	4	Happyend	Neo Sora	Hayato Kurihara, Yukito Hidaka, Yuta Hayashi, Shina Peng, Shirō Sano	
O C T O B E R	11	The Young Strangers	Takuya Uchiyama	Hayato Isomura, Yukino Kishii, Shodai Fukuyama, Shota Sometani, Kōsuke Toyohara, Kenichi Takitō, Reika Kirishima	
O C T O B E R	11	Shinji Muroi: Not Defeated	Katsuyuki Motohiro	Toshirō Yanagiba, Riko Fukumoto, Kouhei Matsushita, Jun Saitō, Kuga Maeyama, Koga Maeyama, Yuma Yamoto, Rina Ikoma	
O C T O B E R	11	Cha-cha	Mai Sakai	Marika Itō, Taishi Nakagawa, Sawako Fujima, Akihisa Shiono, Stefanie Arianne, Takashi Fujii	
O C T O B E R	11	Bishu: The World's Kindest Clothes	Tatsuro Nishikawa	Misaki Hattori, Sae Okazaki, Itsuki Nagasawa, Sōya Kurokawa, Kurara Chibana, Misa Shimizu, Eisaku Yoshida	
O C T O B E R	11	Voices of Loved One	Yoshiyuki Fuji	Takeo Nakahara, Yuuna Yamaki, Chikako Kaku, Isao Hashizume	
O C T O B E R	11	The Last Passenger	Takashi Horie	Karen Iwata, Norimasa Fuke	
O C T O B E R	18	Adabana	Sayaka Kai	Arata Iura, Kiko Mizuhara, Tōko Miura, Miyako Koda, Yuki Saito, Masatoshi Nagase	
O C T O B E R	18	Maru	Naoko Ogigami	Tsuyoshi Domoto, Go Ayano, Riho Yoshioka, Win Morisaki, Satomi Kobayashi	
O C T O B E R	25	Give It All	Yuhei Sakuragi	Sora Amamiya, Miku Itō, Rie Takahashi, Akari Kitō, Ikumi Hasegawa	
O C T O B E R	25	Hakkenden: Fiction and Reality	Fumihiko Sori	Koji Yakusho, Seiyō Uchino, Tao Tsuchiya, Keisuke Watanabe, Jin Suzuki, Rihito Itagaki, Koshi Mizukami, Chiaki Kuriyama, Hayato Isomura, Haru Kuroki, Shinobu Terajima	
O C T O B E R	25	All of Tokyo!	Kazuyoshi Kumakiri	Yōko Shōgenji, Rina Watanabe, Kaho Fujishima, Tamaki Ishizuka, Nanami Konishi, Kirari Takeuchi, Honoka Hirao, Mitsuki Hiraoka, Rio Shimizu, Sumire Miyachi, Haruka Yamashita	
N O V E M B E R	1	11 Rebels	Kazuya Shiraishi	Takayuki Yamada, Taiga Nakano, Onoe Ukon II, Riho Sayashi, Shūhei Nomura, Takara Sakumoto, Seiji Chihara, Amane Okayama, Yūya Matsuura, Hayate Ichinose, Ryōta Oyanagi, Chikara Motoyama, Hiroshi Tamaki, Sadao Abe	
N O V E M B E R	1	Aimitagai	Shogo Kusano	Haru Kuroki, Aoi Nakamura, Sawako Fujima, Hana Kondō, Tamaki Shiratori, Jun Fubuki, Mitsuko Kusabue	
N O V E M B E R	1	Stolen Identity: Final Hacking Game	Hideo Nakata	Ryo Narita, Yudai Chiba, Kwon Eun-bi, Ryohei Otani, Mai Shiraishi, Arata Iura	
N O V E M B E R	8	The Real You	Yuya Ishii	Sosuke Ikematsu, Yūko Tanaka, Ayaka Miyoshi, Koshi Mizukami, Taiga Nakano, Min Tanaka, Go Ayano, Satoshi Tsumabuki	
N O V E M B E R	8	You Are Mine!	Mitsunori Yokobori	Miho Watanabe, Masaya Kimura, Nagisa Saitō, Jyutaro Yamanaka	
N O V E M B E R	8	Fuuto PI: The Portrait of Kamen Rider Skull	Yosuke Kabashima	Yoshimasa Hosoya, Koki Uchiyama, Akira Sekine, Mikako Komatsu, Makoto Furukawa, Daisuke Ono, Kenjiro Tsuda	
N O V E M B E R	8	Route 29	Yūsuke Morii	Haruka Ayase, Kana Osawa, Mikako Ichikawa, Hiroko Isayama, Kengo Kora, Kōnosuke Harada, Misako Watanabe	
N O V E M B E R	8	BanG Dream! It's MyGO!!!!! Sing, Songs That Become Us & Film Live	Kodai Kakimoto	Hina Yōmiya, Hina Aoki, Rin Tateishi, Mika Kohinata, Coco Hayashi	
N O V E M B E R	15	Shinji Muroi: Stay Alive	Katsuyuki Motohiro	Toshirō Yanagiba, Riko Fukumoto, Kouhei Matsushita, Jun Saitō, Kuga Maeyama, Koga Maeyama, Yuma Yamoto, Rina Ikoma	
N O V E M B E R	15	Yano-kun's Ordinary Days	Takehiko Shinjō	Yusei Yagi, Anji Ikehata, Kaito Nakamura	
N O V E M B E R	15	At the Bench	Yoshiyuki Okuyama	Suzu Hirose, Taiga Nakano, Yukino Kishii, Amane Okayama, Yoshiyoshi Arakawa, Mio Imada, Nana Mori, Tsuyoshi Kusanagi, Riho Yoshioka, Ryunosuke Kamiki	
N O V E M B E R	15	Oasis	Takurō Iwaya	Hiroya Shimizu, Mahiro Takasugi, Marika Itō	
N O V E M B E R	22	6 Lying University Students	Yūichi Satō	Minami Hamabe, Eiji Akaso, Hayato Sano, Mizuki Yamashita, Yūki Kura, Sho Nishigaki	
N O V E M B E R	22	Silence of the Sea	Setsurō Wakamatsu	Masahiro Motoki, Kyoko Koizumi, Misa Shimizu, Megumi Sugeno, Kōji Ishizaka, Kiichi Nakai	
N O V E M B E R	22	Angry Squad: The Civil Servant and the Seven Swindlers	Shin'ichirō Ueda	Seiyō Uchino, Masaki Okada, Rina Kawaei, Aoi Morikawa, Takenori Goto, Shusaku Kamikawa, Seina Suzuki, Miki Maya	
N O V E M B E R	29	Lust in the Rain	Shinzo Katayama	Ryo Narita, Eriko Nakamura, Go Morita, Sophia Li, Naoto Takenaka	
N O V E M B E R	29	Faceless	Michihito Fujii	Ryusei Yokohama, Riho Yoshioka, Shintaro Morimoto, Anna Yamada, Takayuki Yamada	
N O V E M B E R	29	Naomi	Kishu Izuchi	Shima Onishi, Sena Natsuki, Shiori Doi, Miyoko Yoshimoto, Takehiro Murata	
D E C E M B E R	6	Doctor-X: The Movie	Naoki Tamura	Ryoko Yonekura, Kei Tanaka, Yuki Uchida, Mio Imada, Masanobu Katsumura, Kosuke Suzuki, Shota Sometani, Go Ayano, Kenichi Endō, Ittoku Kishibe, Toshiyuki Nishida	
D E C E M B E R	6	Ito and Her Brothers	Kōichirō Miki	Mei Hata, Ryuto Sakuma, Yuto Nasu, Nao Oriyama, Kirato Uchida	
D E C E M B E R	13	Fushigi Dagashiya Zenitendō	Hideo Nakata	Yūki Amami, Kazuya Ohashi, Mone Kamishiraishi, Rikka Ihara, Kokoro Hirasawa, Himena Irei, Noa Shiroyama	
D E C E M B E R	13	Cells at Work!	Hideki Takeuchi	Mei Nagano, Takeru Satoh, Mana Ashida, Koji Yamamoto, Riisa Naka, Wakana Matsumoto, Shota Sometani, Kyoko Fukada, Kataoka Ainosuke VI, Fukase, Sadao Abe	
D E C E M B E R	13	Symphony of Smoldering Chaos	Shinsuke Tatsukawa	Masato Wada, Ryusuke Komakine, Nagiko Tsuji, Miru Nagase, Yoshimi Tokui, Yoshinori Okada	
D E C E M B E R	20	Saint Young Men: The Movie	Yūichi Fukuda	Kenichi Matsuyama, Shota Sometani, Kento Kaku, Takanori Iwata, Mai Shiraishi, Ryo Katsuji, Jiro Sato, Masataka Kubota	
D E C E M B E R	20	Oshi no Ko: The Final Act	Smith	Kaito Sakurai, Asuka Saitō, Nagisa Saitō, Nanoka Hara, Mizuki Kayashima, Ano, Kazunari Ninomiya	
D E C E M B E R	20	Nintama Rantarō: Invincible Master of the Dokutake Ninja	Masaya Fujimori	Minami Takayama, Mayumi Tanaka, Teiyū Ichiryūsai, Toshihiko Seki, Showtaro Morikubo, Tsubasa Yonaga, Yasuhiro Mamiya	
D E C E M B E R	20	In Your Own Words	Takashi Watanabe	Kou Maehara, Sakurako Konishi, Chika Uchida, Eita Okuno, Yoshi Sakou	
D E C E M B E R	27	The Hotel of My Dream	Yukihiko Tsutsumi	Non, Kenchi Tachibana, Kei Tanaka, Kenichi Takitō, Ai Hashimoto, Ken Mitsuishi, Mayumi Wakamura	
D E C E M B E R	30	La Grande Maison Paris	Ayuko Tsukahara	Takuya Kimura, Kyōka Suzuki, Ok Taec-yeon, Yuta Tamamori, Mitsuhiro Oikawa, Ikki Sawamura	

== See also ==
- List of 2024 box office number-one films in Japan
- 2024 in Japan
- 2024 in Japanese television
