= 46th Yokohama Film Festival =

2025 film festival in Yokohama, Japan

- Location: Yokohama, Kanagawa, Japan
- Founded: 1980
- Hosted by: Kazuhiro Kojima
- Festival date: 2 February 2025

The 46th Yokohama Film Festival (第46回ヨコハマ映画祭) was held on 2 February 2025. The awards were announced on 1 December 2024.

== Awards ==
- Best Film: - All the Long Nights
- Best Director: Yu Irie - A Girl Named Ann
- Yoshimitsu Morita Memorial Best New Director: Hiroshi Okuyama - My Sunshine
- Best Screenplay: Akiko Nogi - Let's Go Karaoke!, Last Mile
- Best Cinematographer: Takeshi Hamada - The Real You
- Best Actress: Hana Sugisaki - Ichiko, Sakura, 52-Hertz Whales
- Best Actor:
  - Taiga Nakano - 11 Rebels
  - Koji Yakusho - Perfect Days, Hakkenden: Fiction and Reality
- Best Supporting Actress: Ayaka Miyoshi - The Real You
- Best Supporting Actor: Sosuke Ikematsu - My Sunshine, Baby Assassins: Nice Days
- Best Newcomer:
  - Keitatsu Koshiyama - My Sunshine
  - Jun Saitō - Let's Go Karaoke!, Confetti, Teasing Master Takagi-san Movie
  - Natsuki Deguchi - Honeko Akabane's Bodyguards
- Examiner Special Award: Toshikuni Doi - Tsushima: Fukushima Speaks Part 2, Report From Gaza
- Special Grand Prize: Mitsuko Kusabue - 90 Years Old – So What?, Aimitagai

== Top 10 ==
No.	Title
1	All the Long Nights
2	A Samurai in Time
3	Perfect Days
4	A Girl Named Ann
5	Missing
6	Dare to Stop Us 2
7	Living in Two Worlds
8	My Sunshine
9	The Real You
10	11 Rebels
Runner-up: Last Mile
