= 33rd Japan Film Professional Awards =

Japanese film awards in 2024

- Date: July 6, 2024
- Site: Theatre Shinjuku, Tokyo, Japan

The 33rd Japan Film Professional Awards (Japanese: 第33回日本映画プロフェッショナル大賞, Hepburn: Dai 33-kai Nihon Eiga Purofesshonaru Taishō) was the 33rd edition of the Japan Film Professional Awards. It awarded the best of 2023 in film. The ceremony took place on July 6, 2024, at Theatre Shinjuku in Tokyo.

== Awards ==
- Best Film: A Spoiling Rain
- Best Director: Haruhiko Arai (A Spoiling Rain)
- Best Actress: Rinko Kikuchi (Yoko)
- Best Actor: Ken Mitsuishi (Dreaming in Between)
- Best Actor: Kenichi Matsuyama (Do Unto Others)
- Emerging Director: Yurina Kaneko (People Who Talk to Plushies Are Kind)
- Emerging Actress: Satо̄ Honami (A Spoiling Rain)
- Special: Production team of September 1923
- Special Achievement: Tatsuya Fuji (For Takano Tofu and in recognition of his many years of service.

== 10 best films ==
1. A Spoiling Rain (Haruhiko Arai)
2. September 1923 (Tatsuya Mori)
3. Shadow of Fire (Shinya Tsukamoto)
4. Masked Hearts (Yuya Ishii)
5. Undercurrent (Rikiya Imaizumi)
6. The Dry Spell (Masaya Takahashi)
7. Ichiko (Akihiro Toda)
8. Perfect Days (Wim Wenders)
9. (Ab)normal Desire (Yoshiyuki Kishi)
10. River (Junta Yamaguchi)
