= Teasing Master Takagi-san =

Japanese manga series and its adaptations

- First tankōbon volume cover of Teasing Master Takagi-san, featuring Takagi (left) and Nishikata (right)

からかい上手の高木さん (Karakai Jōzu no Takagi-san)
- Genre: Romantic comedy; Slice of life
- Manga
- Written by: Sōichirō Yamamoto
- Published by: Shogakukan
- English publisher: NA: Yen Press
- Imprint: Gessan Shōnen Sunday Comics
- Magazine: Monthly Shōnen Sunday Mini; (2013–2016); Monthly Shōnen Sunday; (2016–2023)
- Original run: June 12, 2013 – October 12, 2023
- Volumes: 20
Further information
Manga
Ashita wa Doyōbi
Written by	Sōichirō Yamamoto
Published by	Shogakukan
Magazine	Yomiuri Chūkōsei Shimbun
Original run	November 7, 2014 – November 2015
Volumes	2
Manga
Koi ni Koisuru Yukari-chan
Written by	Sōichirō Yamamoto
Illustrated by	Yūma Suzu
Published by	Shogakukan
Imprint	Gessan Shōnen Sunday Comics
Magazine	Monthly Shōnen Sunday
Original run	July 12, 2017 – April 11, 2020
Volumes	5
Manga
Karakai Jōzu no (Moto) Takagi-san
Written by	Sōichirō Yamamoto
Illustrated by	Mifumi Inaba
Published by	Shogakukan
Imprint	Gessan Shōnen Sunday Comics
Magazine	MangaONE
Original run	July 15, 2017 – July 24, 2024
Volumes	23
Anime television series
Directed by	Hiroaki Akagi
Written by	Season 1: Michiko Yokote; Tōko Machida; Fumi Tsubota; Seasons 2 and 3: Hiroko Fukuda; Aki Itami; Kan'ichi Katō
Music by	Hiroaki Tsutsumi
Studio	Shin-Ei Animation
Licensed by	Season 1: Crunchyroll (streaming); SEA: Medialink; Season 2: Netflix (streaming); Season 3: Sentai Filmworks; SEA: Muse Communication
Original network	Tokyo MX, ytv, BS11, AT-X, BS NTV, J:COM TV (S1–2); JNN (MBS, TBS) (S3)
English network	SEA: Animax Asia (S1 & 3)
Original run	January 8, 2018 – March 26, 2022
Episodes	36 + OVA
Manga
Karakai Jōzu (?) no Nishikata-san
Written by	Sōichirō Yamamoto
Illustrated by	Mifumi Inaba
Published by	Shogakukan
Imprint	Gessan Shōnen Sunday Comics
Magazine	Monthly Shōnen Sunday
Original run	November 10, 2023 – August 9, 2024
Volumes	1
Television drama
Directed by	Rikiya Imaizumi
Written by	Rikiya Imaizumi; Tomoki Kanazawa; Jun Hagimori
Licensed by	Netflix
Original network	TBS
Original run	April 2, 2024 (Note: The first two episodes were released on Netflix on March 26, 2024. From episode 2 onward, episodes were released on Netflix two weeks prior to their air dates on television.) – May 21, 2024
Episodes	8
Film
Teasing Master Takagi-san: The Movie (2022); Teasing Master Takagi-san Movie (2024)
- icon

Teasing Master Takagi-san (Japanese: からかい上手の高木さん, Hepburn: Karakai Jōzu no Takagi-san; lit. "Good at Teasing, Miss Takagi") is a Japanese manga series written and illustrated by Sōichirō Yamamoto. It began serialization in Shogakukan's shōnen manga magazine supplement Monthly Shōnen Sunday Mini in June 2013, and later moved to the main magazine, Monthly Shōnen Sunday, in July 2016 and finished in October 2023. Its chapters were collected in twenty tankōbon volumes. The series follows the daily lives of two middle school students, one who enjoys teasing her crush, and the other who constantly fails to get back at her. In North America, the manga is licensed by Yen Press.

An anime television series by Shin-Ei Animation aired from January to March 2018. An original video animation (OVA) was released in July 2018. A second season aired from July to September 2019. A third season aired from January to March 2022, and an animated film premiered in June 2022. A television drama adaptation aired from April to May 2024. A live-action film premiered in May 2024.

In 2021, Teasing Master Takagi-san won the 66th Shogakukan Manga Award in the shōnen category. By July 2025, the manga had over 13.5 million copies in circulation.

== Plot ==
Middle school students Nishikata and Takagi sit next to each other in class. Takagi enjoys teasing Nishikata with embarrassing pranks and jokes, as she has a crush on him. In response, Nishikata constantly attempts to get back at her, but he fails when she identifies his weaknesses and capitalizes on them.

== Characters ==
Takagi (高木さん, Takagi-san)
Voiced by: Rie Takahashi (Japanese); Sarah Wiedenheft (seasons 1 and 3), Kayli Mills (season 2) (English)
Portrayed by: Rui Tsukishima (drama), Mei Nagano (film)
Takagi is a middle school student who passes the time by teasing her seatmate, Nishikata; she enjoys his reactions to her pranks as she has a crush on him.^{Ch. 1} When asked by their classmates if she and Nishikata are a couple, she denies it.^{Vol. 1 bonus}
Nishikata (西片くん, Nishikata-kun)
Voiced by: Yuki Kaji (Japanese); Aaron Dismuke (Note: Bryson Baugus filled in for Dismuke as Nishikata in certain episodes of the third season.^{Ep. 31, 35, 36, and 37 credits}) (seasons 1 and 3), Billy Kametz (season 2) (English)
Portrayed by: Sōya Kurokawa (drama), Fumiya Takahashi (film)
Nishikata is Takagi's seatmate and the target of her teasing.^{Ch. 1} He is constantly thinking of ways to get back at her, but Takagi always takes advantage of the situation and thwarts his schemes. Nishikata refused to acknowledge that he might like Takagi as more than friends until later on in the series when he realized his feelings for her.
Mina Hibino (日比野 ミナ, Hibino Mina)
Voiced by: Konomi Kohara (Japanese); Leah Clark (season 1), Cassandra Lee Morris (season 2), Maggie Flecknoe (season 3) (English)
Portrayed by: Rin Serizawa (drama)
A childish girl with large eyebrows.
Yukari Tenkawa (天川 ユカリ, Tenkawa Yukari)
Voiced by: M.A.O (Japanese); Kristen McGuire (season 1 and 3), Erika Harlacher (season 2) (English)
Portrayed by: Merisa Kikawa (drama)
Mina and Sanae's friend. She wears glasses. Although she tries to maintain a semblance of maturity as class president, she regularly lets her classmates copy her answers so no one would fail.
Sanae Tsukimoto (月本 サナエ, Tsukimoto Sanae)
Voiced by: Yui Ogura (Japanese); Kristi Rothrock (seasons 1 and 3), Sarah Anne Williams (season 2) (English)
Portrayed by: Rito Yoshizawa (drama)
Mina's best friend, unruffled and quietly amused by her antics. She, Mina, and Yukari hang out together as a trio. She has short dark hair.^{Ch. 54}
Nakai (中井)
Voiced by: Yuma Uchida (Japanese); Chris Thurman (season 1), Zach Aguilar (season 2), James Marler^{Ep. 26 credits} (season 3) (English)
Portrayed by: Takuya Kawajiri (drama), Jin Suzuki (film)
Friend of Nishikata and classmate of both him and Takagi; he and Mano are a couple.
Mano (真野)
Voiced by: Kotori Koiwai (Japanese); Jad Saxton (seasons 1 and 3), Christine Marie Cabanos (season 2) (English)
Portrayed by: Rea Morinaga (drama), Yuna Taira (film)
Classmate of Nishikata and Takagi; she and Nakai are a couple. She has short dark hair with small pigtails.
Takao (高尾)
Voiced by: Nobuhiko Okamoto (Japanese); Blake Shepard (seasons 1 and 3), Kyle McCarley (season 2) (English)
Portrayed by: Yuta Ichimura (drama)
One of Nishikata's close friends along with Kimura. He is a bespectacled boy with buck teeth.^{Ch. 2}
Kimura (木村)
Voiced by: Fukushi Ochiai (Japanese); Jerry Jewell (season 1), Bryce Papenbrook (season 2), Joe Daniels (season 3) (English)
Portrayed by: Satoshi Mizuno (drama)
One of Nishikata's friends along with Takao.^{Ch. 2} He is an overweight boy who dislikes running.
Mr. Tanabe (田辺先生, Tanabe-sensei)
Voiced by: Hinata Tadokoro (Japanese); Cris George (seasons 1 and 3), Patrick Seitz (season 2) (English)
Portrayed by: Yosuke Eguchi (drama and film)
Tanabe is Nishikata and Takagi's no-nonsense homeroom teacher.^{Ch. 3}
Hamaguchi (浜口)
Voiced by: Koki Uchiyama (Japanese); Johnny Yong Bosch (season 2), Scott Gibbs^{Ep. 28 credits} (season 3) (English)
Portrayed by: Ryoto Nagahara (drama), Oshirō Maeda (film)
One of Nishikata's friends. He tries to act mature in order to get Houjou to become interested in him.^{Ch. 41}
Houjou (北条さん, Hōjō-san)
Voiced by: Aoi Yūki (Japanese); Abby Trott (season 2), Kira Vincent-Davis^{Ep. 28 credits} (season 3) (English)
Portrayed by: Ikoi Hayase (drama), Sara Shida (film)
Houjou is a classmate who is reputed to like mature people.^{Ch. 41}
Sumire Takagawa (鷹川すみれ, Takagawa Sumire)
Voiced by: Madoka Asahina (Japanese); Olivia Swasey^{Ep. 28 credits} (season 3) (English)
Sumire is a close friend of Takagi with a distinctive ponytail. She shares with Takagi an enjoyment for long walks.
Chi Nishikata (西片ちー, Nishikata Chi)
Voiced by: Yume Miyamoto^{Ep. 30 credits} (Japanese); Elissa Cuellar^{Ep. 30 credits} (English)
Chi is the daughter of Takagi and Nishikata according to the flashforward chapters of the main series.^{Ch. 36} The spinoff series Karakai Jōzu no (Moto) Takagi-san features Chi as a main character. While Chi usually joins her mother in her pranks on her father, she fails to outsmart Takagi herself.

== Media ==
=== Manga ===
Written by Sōichirō Yamamoto, Teasing Master Takagi-san began serialization in Shogakukan's shōnen manga magazine supplement Monthly Shōnen Sunday Mini on June 12, 2013, and it moved to the main Monthly Shōnen Sunday magazine on July 12, 2016. The series finished on October 12, 2023. Its chapters were collected in twenty tankōbon volumes.

In November 2017, Yen Press announced the acquisition of the manga for an English release in North America.

==== Spin-offs ====
A spin-off manga series by Yamamoto, titled Ashita wa Doyōbi (あしたは土曜日; lit. "Tomorrow is Saturday"), was serialized in the newspaper Yomiuri Chūkōsei Shimbun from November 7, 2014, to November 2015, and was collected into two tankōbon volumes. It was also adapted within the Teasing Master Takagi-san anime adaptation in 2018.

A second spin-off manga series by Yūma Suzu, titled Koi ni Koisuru Yukari-chan (恋に恋するユカリちゃん; lit. "Yukari-chan in Love with Love"), was serialized in Monthly Shōnen Sunday from July 12, 2017, to April 11, 2020, and was collected into five tankōbon volumes.

A third spin-off by Mifumi Inaba, titled Karakai Jōzu no (Moto) Takagi-san (からかい上手の（元）高木さん; lit. "Teasing Master (Former) Takagi-san"), featuring an adult Takagi, now married to Nishikata, and their daughter, Chi, was serialized on the MangaONE app from July 15, 2017, to July 24, 2024. Its chapters have been collected into twenty-three tankōbon volumes.

A fourth spin-off by Inaba, titled Karakai Jōzu (?) no Nishikata-san (からかい上手(？)の西片さん; lit. "Teasing Master (?) Nishikata-san"), centered around Chi during her middle school years, was serialized for ten chapters in Monthly Shōnen Sunday from November 10, 2023, to August 9, 2024; the collected volume was released on October 11, 2024.

=== Anime ===
An anime television series adaptation was announced in the August 2017 issue of Shogakukan's Monthly Shōnen Sunday magazine. The series was directed by Hiroaki Akagi at Shin-Ei Animation, with scripts written by Michiko Yokote and character designs by Aya Takano. It aired from January 8 to March 26, 2018, on Tokyo MX and other channels. The series ran for 12 episodes. Crunchyroll simulcasted the series, while Funimation streamed the series with an English dub.

On January 10, 2019, it was announced that the series would receive a second season; the staff and cast reprised their respective roles. It aired from July 7 to September 22, 2019, on Tokyo MX and other channels, with episodes being exclusively streamed on Netflix in Japan; a worldwide release on Netflix took place on December 6. The worldwide release was removed from Netflix on December 6, 2024.

A third season and an animated film were officially announced in September 2021 after they were first teased with the release of the sixteenth volume of the manga. The third season aired on the Super Animeism block on MBS and TBS, and other networks from January 8 to March 26, 2022. (Note: MBS listed the season premiere at 25:25 on January 7, 2022, which is effectively January 8 at 1:25 a.m. JST.) The film features returning staff members from the third season of the anime series. It was released in Japan on June 10, 2022. On December 28, 2021, Sentai Filmworks announced it had acquired the rights to the third season and the film for worldwide distribution excluding Asia, and is streaming it on Hidive.

=== Video game ===
The mobile game Teasing Master Takagi-san: Kyunkyun Records (からかい上手の高木さん キュンキュンレコーズ) was released on Android and iOS on June 8, 2022. The game ended its service on March 31, 2023, but Toho Games stated in January 2023 that they intended to release its offline version.

=== Live action ===
A live-action adaptation was announced in March 2023, with Rikiya Imaizumi serving as the director. In September 2023, Tomoki Kanazawa and Jun Hagimori were announced to be writing the live-action television drama series, with TBS producing it in cooperation with Fine Entertainment. Rui Tsukishima and Sōya Kurokawa portray Takagi and Nishikata, respectively. The series aired on the TBS channel block programming Drama Stream in Japan from April 2 to May 21, 2024. Aimer performed the theme song "Haruka" (遥か). Netflix streamed the series worldwide.

A live-action film was announced in November 2023, with Imaizumi set to direct and write it alongside Kanazawa and Hagimori. It is set a decade after the events of the manga, with Mei Nagano portraying Takagi, who works as a trainee teacher in her middle school alma mater, and Fumiya Takahashi portraying Nishikata, who works as a gym coach at the same school. The film premiered in Japan on May 31, 2024.

== Reception ==
By December 2016, the manga had over 1 million copies in circulation. By February 2018, that number had increased to 4 million copies. It had over 6 million copies in circulation by February 2019; over 11 million copies in circulation by August 2023; over 12 million copies in circulation by October 2023; and over 13.5 million copies in circulation by July 2025.

The manga was nominated for the 10th Manga Taishō awards in 2017. In 2021, along with Chainsaw Man, Teasing Master Takagi-san won the 66th Shogakukan Manga Award in the shōnen category.

== Works cited ==
- "Ch." and Vol. is shortened form for chapter and volume, referring to a number of the Teasing Master Takagi-san manga.
- "Ep." is shortened form for episode and refers to an episode number of the Teasing Master Takagi-san anime series.
