= Undercurrent (manga) =

Japanese manga series and its adaptation

- Tankōbon volume cover, featuring Kanae Sekiguchi

アンダーカレント (Andākarento)
- Genre: Drama; Slice of life
- Manga
- Written by: Tetsuya Toyoda
- Published by: Kodansha
- Imprint: Afternoon KC Deluxe
- Magazine: Monthly Afternoon
- Original run: August 25, 2004 – August 25, 2005
- Volumes: 1
- Live-action film
- Directed by: Rikiya Imaizumi
- Written by: Kaori Sawai; Rikiya Imaizumi
- Music by: Haruomi Hosono
- Studio: Joker Films; Kadokawa Corporation
- Released: August 26, 2023 (Yufuin); October 6, 2023 (Japan)
- Runtime: 143 minutes
- icon

Undercurrent (Japanese: アンダーカレント, Hepburn: Andākarento; stylized in English as undercurrent) is a Japanese manga series written and illustrated by Tetsuya Toyoda. It was serialized in Kodansha's seinen manga magazine Monthly Afternoon from August 2004 to August 2005. Kodansha collected its chapters in a single tankōbon volume. A live action film adaptation was released in 2023.

The story is set in contemporary Japan, and follows the manager of a public bath named Kanae Sekiguchi, whose husband vanished while traveling. The French edition of the manga was widely reviewed, being praised for its dream-like qualities and calm pace, the richness of its emotions, and its characterization.

== Plot ==
Kanae Sekiguchi has recently reopened the Tsukinoyu (月乃湯) public bathhouse that she manages, after temporarily closing when her husband, Satoru, disappeared on a business trip two months ago. During her time alone, she occasionally dreams about sinking in water and being strangled. She is introduced to a man named Takayuki Hori who was sent by the public bath union, and allows him to stay for the next several months. Despite his quiet and mysterious nature, Hori works diligently to help keep the bathhouse running.

While shopping for groceries, Kanae reunites with her old friend Yoko Kanno. Learning about Satoru's disappearance, Kanno refers her to an acquaintance, detective Michio Yamazaki. As Yamazaki investigates Satoru's history and potential whereabouts, he reports back to Kanae that one major part of Satoru's past was a lie; despite claiming to have lost his parents in a traffic accident at a young age, Satoru actually had a normal childhood, his parents recently dying in a house fire two years ago.

Hearing about a nearby bathhouse closing down, Kanae and Hori drive there to acquire its boiler for the Tsukinoyu. However, they discover the building intentionally burned down by its owner, who then disappeared under suspicious circumstances. On the way back, Kanae discloses to Hori about her recurring dream.

Yamazaki tells Kanae that in the company Satoru worked for, one of his co-workers had been caught embezzling funds for their mother's medical treatment. Satoru took the blame for them and quit the company. On the day he disappeared, he withdrew all the money in his bank account. Not having known any of this beforehand and accepting that her husband is not returning, Kanae thanks Yamazaki and asks to end the investigation.

One day, a young regular visitor to the Tsukinoyu named Miyu is kidnapped. Overwhelmed with anxiety, Kanae faints and reminisces about her childhood, revealing the source of her recurring dream: in elementary school, a close friend named Sanae was also kidnapped, her body later found strangled in a pond. Unable to save her or tell anyone about her killer, Kanae was wracked with guilt, wanting to die in her place. Miyu is later found safe to everyone's relief, but Kanae is left bedridden in trauma. A few days after, Kanae recovers and goes on a walk with Hori, who had been managing the bathhouse in her absence. Kanae asks him to promise that when he departs, they say their goodbyes.

Yamazaki calls Kanae to inform her that Satoru has finally been located, with a meeting arranged for tomorrow. Seeing each other for the first time in a café, Satoru confesses to being a compulsive liar since childhood, disappearing if things failed to add up; he admits that embezzling from his company was his own doing. Kanae questions if their entire marriage was built on a lie, noting the many instances Satoru refused to tell her something when they were together. She acknowledges that perhaps they never understood each other. The two agree to a divorce and bid each other farewell.

Meanwhile, Hori packs up and leaves the Tsukinoyu by himself. On the way, he meets a local eccentric elder man with whom he had grown close to, Saburo Tajima. Saburo reveals that he knows Hori is Sanae's older brother. Hori tells him that after his sister's death, his parents divorced and he was moved frequently. Grieving over his loss, Hori began to imagine Kanae as what Sanae could have looked like as an adult, at first observing her from afar, then working for her over the past few months, never telling her his true identity. Seeing how much Sanae's death still affects Kanae, Hori expresses regret over his stay and decides there is nothing else he can do for her. The two exchange goodbyes before parting.

== Characters ==
Kanae Sekiguchi (関口 かなえ, Sekiguchi Kanae)
Portrayed by: Yōko Maki
Takayuki Hori (堀 隆之, Hori Takayuki)
Portrayed by: Arata Iura
Michio Yamazaki (山崎 道夫, Yamazaki Michio)
Portrayed by: Lily Franky
Satoru Shiraishi (白石 悟, Shiraishi Satoru)
Portrayed by: Eita Nagayama
Yoko Kanno (菅野 よう子, Kanno Yōko)
Portrayed by: Noriko Eguchi
Toshie Kijima (木島 敏江, Kijima Toshie)
Portrayed by: Kumi Nakamura
Saburo Tajima (田島 三郎, Tajima Saburō)
Portrayed by: Suon Kan
Mina Fujikawa (藤川 美奈, Fujikawa Mina)
Portrayed by: Rio Uchida

== Media ==
=== Manga ===
Written and illustrated by Tetsuya Toyoda, Undercurrent was serialized in Kodansha's seinen manga magazine Monthly Afternoon from August 25, 2004, (Note: Debuted in the magazine's October 2004 issue, released in August of that year.) to August 25, 2005. (Note: Ended in the magazine's October 2005 issue, released on August 25 of that year.) Kodansha collected its 11 chapters into a single tankōbon volume, released on November 22, 2005 (ISBN 978-4-06-372092-1).

The manga was licensed in France by Kana, under its collection Made in; one volume was published on September 19, 2008 (ISBN 978-2-505-00450-9).

=== Live action film ===
A live action film adaptation was announced on January 16, 2023. It was directed by Rikiya Imaizumi, written by Kaori Sawai and Rikiya Imaizumi, and composed by Haruomi Hosono. Yōko Maki stars as Kanae Sekiguchi.

The film was distributed by Kadokawa Corporation. After a special screening in the 48th Yufuin Film Festival on August 26, 2023, the film premiered in Japanese theaters on October 6, 2023.

== Reception ==
In France, Undercurrent was an official selection of the 2009 Angoulême International Comics Festival. It won the Prix Asie-ACBD Award in the 2009 Japan Expo Awards. It was named as top manga pick for year 2008 by the Belgian newspaper Le Soir.

The film adaptation of Undercurrent was selected as the fifth best Japanese film of 2023 in the 33rd Japan Film Professional Awards, and the eighth best Japanese film of 2023 in the 45th Yokohama Film Festival.
