= Labyrinth (2026 film) =

2026 Japanese animated film by Shōji Kawamori

- Theatrical release poster
- Japanese: 迷宮のしおり
- Revised Hepburn: Meikyū no Shiori
- Directed by: Shōji Kawamori
- Screenplay by: Taichi Hashimoto
- Produced by: Ken Teraizumi; Kazuki Ōshima; Masako Iwamoto
- Starring: Suzuka (Atarashii Gakko!); Taizo Harada; Aoi Itō; Jun Saitō
- Music by: yonkey
- Production company: Sanzigen
- Distributed by: Gaga
- Release date: January 1, 2026
- Running time: 116 minutes
- Country: Japan
- Language: Japanese
- Box office: $45,801

Labyrinth (Japanese: 迷宮のしおり, Hepburn: Meikyū no Shiori) is an original anime film directed by Shōji Kawamori and produced by Sanzigen with Slow Curve handling general production duties from an original story from said company alongside Vector Vision, Gaga and Fuji Television. The film also features character designs by Risa Ebata, a screenplay by Taichi Hashimoto, and music by yonkey. It premiered in Japanese theaters on January 1, 2026, distributed by Gaga. The film's theme song is "Sailor, Sail On" performed by the Atarashii Gakko! pop group.

The film premiered in Glasgow as part of Scotland Loves Anime on November 2, 2025. GKIDS released the film in the North America on May 10, 2026.

== Plot ==
Shiori Maezawa, a high school girl living in Yokohama, has always had anxiety since childhood; she sang a song but was unable to post it due to her insecurities about putting her creative side on the internet. As teenagers, Shiori and her best friend Kirara have a goal of becoming famous online so they can save up money and open a themed cafe. After sneaking into a port and attempting to film a dance video, Shiori becomes self-conscious and tumbles down the stairs on camera. Kirara posts the video without her permission but disappears, and the video slowly becomes viral.

After breaking her phone, Shiori hides in a washroom stall but finds herself surrounded by stickers. One rabbit sticker named Komori tries to explain the situation to her, but she freaks out and finds herself in an empty void inside her phone that resembles Yokohama, but she is the only inhabitant except for wild floating stickers and Komori, and she realizes that she is trapped in a strange labyrinth inside her smartphone.

Shiori checks her phone to make calls and social media posts and attempts to seek out help, only to find photos of herself on her social media accounts that she does not remember posting until she discovers a doppelganger version of herself who has taken over her life and keeps smoothing over the calls for help. Shiori rebrands herself as Shiori:Revolution and wears a gaudy pink and blue wig and endeavors to reach 100 million likes. Anytime Shiori makes a post about being replaced, Shiori:Revolution deletes it or blames it on being hacked.

The void in Shiori's phone becomes her new prison, and Shiori allows Komori to assist her as she explores the void world. She tries to go to Kirara's house, thinking she is also trapped, and discovers a black magic tome that may be the cause of Shiori's exile. When her phone was almost depleted, shadow hands tried to grab Shiori and put her in a press machine to turn her into a sticker, but Komori charged her phone and saved her.

Shiori:Revolution takes many steps to become viral, doing many events and posts, and even allowing her image to be used for free for all branding for products. She quickly jumps up in popularity, but there is pushback from her aggressive campaign. Shiori:Revolution meets a mysterious man named Suguru Kagami who says he is responsible for the void world and wants to team up with her to change the world. They plan a large festival and a new app that people can download to fulfill their plan in an attempt to reach 100 million likes on social media.

In the void, Komori convinces Shiori to contact an old friend with whom she has become distant, a boy from her childhood named Kento Yamada. After convincing him, Kento is told to go to a hotel to try to get Suguru's phone to try and get Shiori freed, but he fails while trying to interrupt Suguru's move on Shiori:Revolution.

Shiori:Revolution finds Kirara at her house. It turns out she has not disappeared into the void but has become a hermit when the embarrassing video of Shiori went viral instead of ridiculing her. Shiori's insecurity about Kirara getting more views has manifested in this alternate, jealous version of her, so Shiori:Revolution writes Kirara a letter ending their friendship. Kento can talk to Kirara and tell her where the real Shiori is, and then recruit her to stop the festival's plan. Kirara is revealed to be jealous of Shiori. Even though Kirara got more views in their youth, Shiori got more positive comments about her cuteness.

At the music festival, Shiori:Revolution performs a song as the new world is about to be changed, but Komori tries to stop it from his side with a hack. Suguru summons a giant mecha made up of shipping containers and vehicles, and Komori also transforms into a rabbit mecha. As they battle, Shiori finds out that Komori is actually the human version of Suguru, who had a scandal before he disappeared and became a sticker in the void, while Suguru in the real world turns out to be his doppelganger.

Suguru defeats Komori with his mecha and is ready to enact his plan by transforming everyone in the crowd into copies of Shiori:Revolution and Suguru, saying that they are the pinnacle of the new world and everyone will be like them. Shiori:Revolution disagrees and wants everyone to retain their individuality, and Shiori, having dealt with her alternate self's actions, reforms with Shiori:Revolution and escapes the void. She then turned on Suguru and defeated him with judo flips.

With all threats disappearing, the police arrive and arrest Suguru, telling them that he will face the music. Afterward, Kento confesses his love for Shiori, but she teasingly withholds her answer.

== Voice cast ==
Character	Japanese
Shiori Maezawa/Shiori@Revolution	Suzuka (Atarashii Gakko!)
Komori	Taizo Harada
Kirara Kurashina	Aoi Itō
Kento Yamada	Jun Saitō
Suguru Kagami	Takuto Teranishi (Timelesz)
Keizō Maezawa	Show Hayami
Yoriko Maezawa	Maaya Sakamoto
Tōsaka	Tomokazu Sugita
