= List of 2024 box office number-one films in Japan =

The following is a list of 2024 box office number-one films in Japan by week. When the number-one film in gross is not the same as the number-one film in admissions, both are listed.

== Number-one films ==
†	This implies the highest-grossing movie of the year.

Week #	Date	Film	Gross	Notes
1	January 7, 2024	Spy × Family Code: White	US$3,816,100	
2	January 14, 2024	Spy × Family Code: White	US$2,184,700	
3	January 21, 2024	Golden Kamuy	US$3,607,500	
4	January 28, 2024	Mobile Suit Gundam SEED Freedom	US$7,208,900	
5	February 4, 2024	Demon Slayer: Kimetsu no Yaiba – To the Hashira Training	US$4,360,000	
6	February 11, 2024	Mobile Suit Gundam SEED Freedom	US$3,006,300	
7	February 18, 2024	Haikyu!! The Dumpster Battle	US$14,868,300	
8	February 25, 2024	Haikyu!! The Dumpster Battle	US$7,445,200	
9	March 3, 2024	Doraemon: Nobita's Earth Symphony	US$4,363,900	
10	March 10, 2024	Haikyu!! The Dumpster Battle	US$5,735,500	
11	March 17, 2024	The Floor Plan	US$3,176,500	
12	March 24, 2024	The Floor Plan	US$3,428,800	In attendance
12	March 24, 2024	Haikyu!! The Dumpster Battle	US$3,508,100	In gross
13	March 31, 2024	The Floor Plan	US$3,243,500	
14	April 7, 2024	The Floor Plan	US$2,443,800	
15	April 14, 2024	Detective Conan: The Million-dollar Pentagram †	US$21,779,600	
16	April 21, 2024	Detective Conan: The Million-dollar Pentagram †	US$12,421,200	
17	April 28, 2024	Detective Conan: The Million-dollar Pentagram †	US$8,636,200	
18	May 5, 2024	Detective Conan: The Million-dollar Pentagram †	US$10,539,500	
19	May 12, 2024	Detective Conan: The Million-dollar Pentagram †	US$3,426,000	
20	May 19, 2024	Detective Conan: The Million-dollar Pentagram †	US$2,621,300	
21	May 26, 2024	Dangerous Cops: Home Coming	US$2,250,600	In attendance
21	May 26, 2024	Umamusume: Pretty Derby – Beginning of a New Era	US$2,257,000	In gross
22	June 2, 2024	Furiosa: A Mad Max Saga	US$2,028,200	
23	June 9, 2024	Bocchi the Rock! Re:	US$1,389,000	
24	June 16, 2024	Dear Family	US$1,626,800	
25	June 23, 2024	Dear Family	US$1,233,500	
26	June 30, 2024	Anpanman: Baikinman and Lulun in the Picture Book	US$1,068,500	In attendance
26	June 30, 2024	Look Back	US$1,410,000	In gross
27	July 7, 2024	Look Back	US$1,379,900	
28	July 14, 2024	Kingdom 4: Return of the Great General	US$10,276,200	
29	July 21, 2024	Kingdom 4: Return of the Great General	US$5,218,800	
30	July 28, 2024	Kingdom 4: Return of the Great General	US$3,655,800	In gross
30	July 28, 2024	Despicable Me 4	US$3,310,400	In attendance
31	August 4, 2024	My Hero Academia: You're Next	US$6,271,900	
32	August 11, 2024	Inside Out 2	US$3,539,900	
33	August 18, 2024	Inside Out 2	US$3,409,000	
34	August 25, 2024	Last Mile	US$6,810,500	
35	September 1, 2024	Last Mile	US$4,370,700	
36	September 8, 2024	Last Mile	US$3,318,700	
37	September 15, 2024	All About Suomi	US$3,122,300	
38	September 22, 2024	Last Mile	US$2,475,700	
39	September 29, 2024	Last Mile	US$1,499,200	
40	October 6, 2024	Civil War	US$1,333,100	
41	October 13, 2024	Shinji Muroi: Not Defeated	US$2,419,000	
42	October 20, 2024	Shinji Muroi: Not Defeated	US$1,349,400	
43	October 27, 2024	Hakkenden: Fiction and Reality	US$1,094,700	
44	November 3, 2024	Venom: The Last Dance	US$2,914,300	
45	November 10, 2024	Attack on Titan: The Last Attack	US$1,619,500	
46	November 17, 2024	Shinji Muroi: Stay Alive	US$3,085,500	
47	November 24, 2024	Shinji Muroi: Stay Alive	US$1,309,400	
48	December 1, 2024	Faceless	US$1,343,300	
49	December 8, 2024	Moana 2	US$6,244,400	
50	December 15, 2024	Cells at Work!	US$5,501,200	
51	December 22, 2024	Cells at Work!	US$3,396,100	
52	December 29, 2024	Cells at Work!	US$3,681,500	

== Highest-grossing films ==
International film Japanese film

Highest-grossing films in 2024
Rank	Title	Gross
1	Detective Conan: The Million-dollar Pentagram	¥15.80 billion ($104.38 million)
2	Haikyu!! The Dumpster Battle	¥11.64 billion ($76.9 million)
3	Kingdom 4: Return of the Great General	¥8.03 billion ($53.05 million)
4	Spy × Family Code: White	¥6.32 billion ($41.75 million)
5	Last Mile	¥5.96 billion ($39.37 million)
6	Mobile Suit Gundam SEED Freedom	¥5.38 billion ($35.54 million)
7	Inside Out 2	¥5.36 billion ($35.41 million)
8	The Floor Plan	¥5.07 billion ($33.49 million)
9	Till We Meet Again on the Lily Hill	¥4.54 billion ($29.99 million)
10	Despicable Me 4	¥4.53 billion ($29.93 million)

== See also ==
- List of Japanese films of 2024
