= Sailor Zombie =

Japanese mixed media project

- Cover of the first volume of the manga adaptation (original edition)

セーラーゾンビ (Sērā Zonbi)
- Created by: AKB48; Isshin Inudo
- Television drama
- Directed by: Ryōhei Watanabe; Rikiya Imaizumi; Gō Furukawa
- Written by: Ryōhei Watanabe; Isshin Inudo
- Studio: C&I Entertainment
- Original network: TV Tokyo
- Original run: April 19, 2014 – July 19, 2014
- Episodes: 12
- Manga
- Written by: Isshin Inudo
- Illustrated by: Jiji & Pinch
- Published by: Hero's Inc.
- English publisher: NA: Yen Press (new edition)
- Magazine: Monthly Hero's
- Original run: April 1, 2014 – December 29, 2015
- Volumes: 4 (original and new editions)
- Anime

Sailor Zombie (Japanese: セーラーゾンビ, Hepburn: Sērā Zonbi) is a Japanese mixed-media project created by the AKB48 idol group and Isshin Inudo. A television drama series aired from April to July 2014. A manga adaptation with art by Jiji & Pinch was serialized in Hero's Inc.'s seinen manga magazine Monthly Hero's from April 2014 to December 2015 and was collected in four tankōbon volumes. An anime adaptation has been announced.

== Characters ==
Maiko Inui (乾 舞子, Inui Maiko)
Portrayed by: Nana Owada
Momoka Takizawa (秋月 百花, Takizawa Momoka)
Portrayed by: Rina Kawaei
Mutsumi Oyamada (小山田 睦美, Oyamada Mutsumi)
Portrayed by: Juri Takahashi

== Media ==
=== Drama ===
A television drama series, starring the AKB48 idol group, directed by Ryōhei Watanabe, Rikiya Imaizumi and Gō Furukawa and written by Watanabe and Isshin Inudo, aired from April 19 to July 19, 2014, on TV Tokyo.

=== Manga ===
A manga adaptation illustrated by Jiji & Pinch was serialized in Hero's Inc.'s seinen manga magazine Monthly Hero's from April 1, 2014, to December 29, 2015. The manga's chapters were collected into four tankōbon volumes from September 5, 2014, to March 5, 2016. Four new edition volumes were released between July 29 and August 29, 2024. The new edition is licensed digitally in English by Yen Press.

==== Original edition ====
No.	Release date	ISBN
1	September 5, 2014	978-4-86468-381-4
2	February 5, 2015	978-4-86468-398-2
3	August 5, 2015	978-4-86468-424-8
4	March 5, 2016	978-4-86468-453-8

==== New edition ====
No.	Original release date	Original ISBN	English release date	English ISBN
1	July 29, 2024	978-4-86468-268-8	September 2, 2025	979-8-8554-2066-1
2	July 29, 2024	978-4-86468-269-5	October 14, 2025	979-8-8554-2078-4
3	August 29, 2024	978-4-86468-270-1	October 28, 2025	979-8-8554-2079-1
4	August 29, 2024	978-4-86468-271-8	February 17, 2026	979-8-8554-2080-7

=== Arcade game ===
An arcade video game by Bandai Namco Games, titled Sailor Zombie: AKB48 Arcade Edition, was launched in Japanese arcades in April 2014.

=== Anime ===
An anime adaptation was announced on July 29, 2024.
