= Taiga Nakano =

Japanese actor (born 1993)

- 仲野 太賀
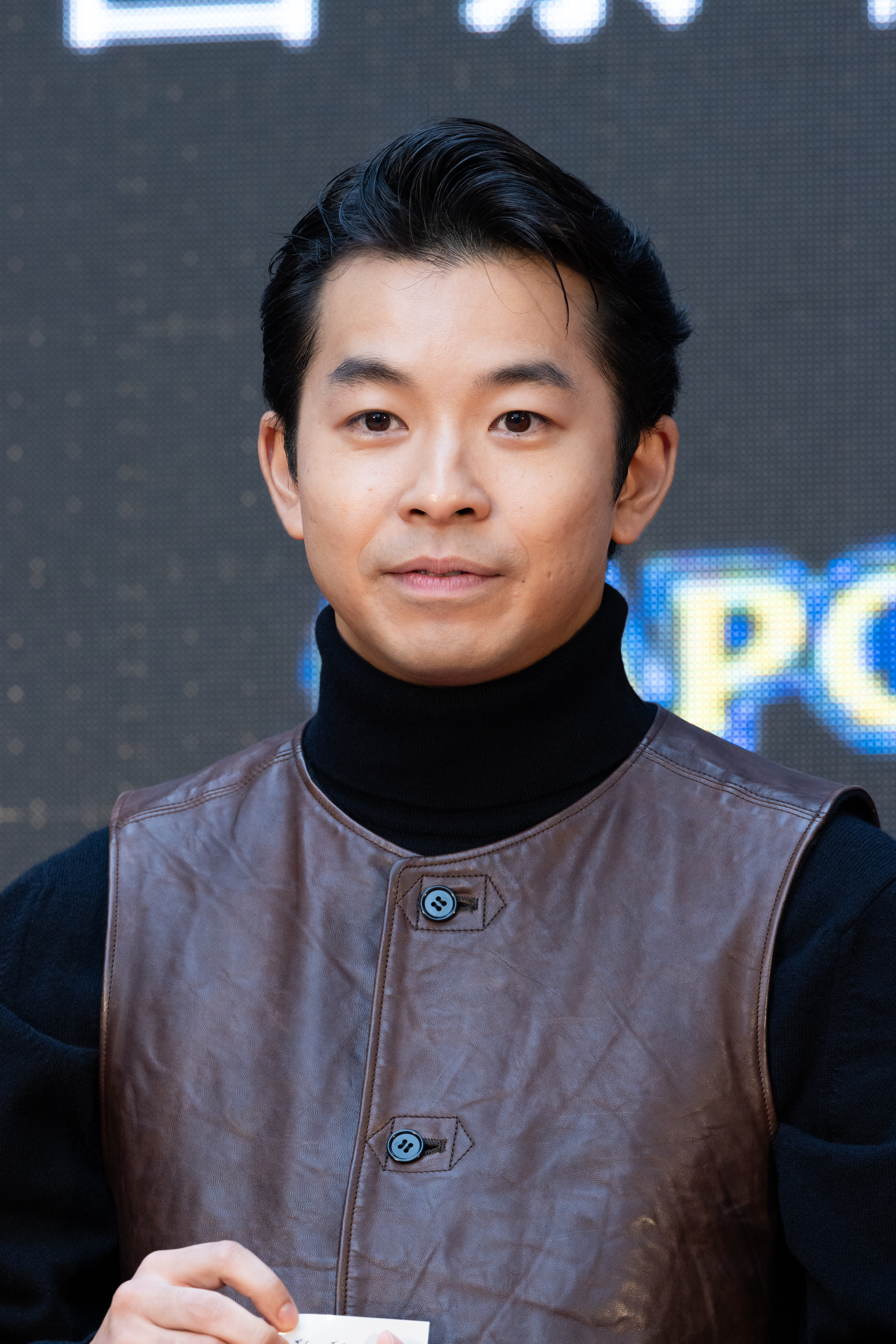
- Taiga at 37th Tokyo International Film Festival in 2024
- Born: February 7, 1993 (age 33); Tokyo, Japan
- Occupation: Actor
- Years active: 2006–present
- Agent: Stardust Promotion
- Parent: Hideo Nakano (father)
- Website: Official profile

Taiga Nakano (仲野 太賀, Nakano Taiga; born February 7, 1993) is a Japanese actor. He is represented with Stardust Promotion. He was previously credited as only Taiga.

== Career ==
Born in 1993, he is the second son of actor Hideo Nakano. Hideo named him "Taiga" in the hope that his son would one day star in a Taiga drama.

After making his acting debut in 2006 at the age of 13, he initially performed under the mononym "Taiga" before changing his stage name to Taiga Nakano in 2019. In 2022, he received Best Supporting Actor at both the Mainichi Film Awards and the Blue Ribbon Awards for his performance in Under the Open Sky. In 2026, he starred as the lead in a Taiga drama, realizing the vision behind his name.

== Filmography ==
=== Film ===
| Year | Title | Role | Notes | Ref(s) |
|---|---|---|---|---|
| 2007 | Freesia | Hiroshi Kano (child) | | |
| 2007 | Battery | Keita Higashitani | | |
| 2008 | 108 | Tachibana | | |
| 2008 | Nasu Shōnenki | Osamu Shiroyama | Lead role | |
| 2008 | The Blue Bird | Takeshi Inoue | | |
| 2008 | Someday's Dreamers | Koji Kuroda | | |
| 2009 | Pandemic | Kenichi Motohashi | | |
| 2009 | Last Operations Under the Orion | Katsumi Suzuki | | |
| 2009 | Rise Up | Yuya Kaji | | |
| 2010 | Hanbun no Tsuki ga Noboru Sora | | | |
| 2010 | The Lone Scalpel | Makoto Takei | | |
| 2010 | Sankaku | Shogo | | |
| 2011 | Eclair | Senkichi Wakamatsu | | |
| 2011 | When I Kill Myself | Ryota Shinjo | | |
| 2011 | Life Back Then | | | |
| 2012 | The Kirishima Thing | Fusuke Koizumi | | |
| 2013 | Daily Lives of High School Boys | Karasawa | | |
| 2013 | Jinrō Game | Tomohiro Hada | | |
| 2014 | Hotori no Sakuko | Takashi Kameda | | |
| 2014 | Monsterz | Akira | | |
| 2014 | My Man | Akatsuki | | |
| 2014 | Sweet Poolside | Takashi Mimura | | |
| 2015 | Again | Norio Matsukawa | | |
| 2015 | Sweet Bean | Yohei | | |
| 2016 | Tokyo Sunrise | Ren | Lead role | |
| 2016 | Harmonium | Takashi Yamagami | | |
| 2016 | Ushijima the Loan Shark: the Final | Naoto Komoto | | |
| 2016 | Japanese Girls Never Die | | | |
| 2017 | Pumpkin and Mayonnaise | Seiichi | | |
| 2017 | Dawn Wind in My Poncho | | Lead role | |
| 2018 | The Man from the Sea | | | |
| 2018 | 50 First Kisses | | | |
| 2018 | No Matter How Much My Mom Hates Me | | Lead role | |
| 2018 | It Comes | Takanashi | | |
| 2018 | Ten Years Japan | Watanabe | Lead role; anthology film | |
| 2019 | Almost a Miracle | | | |
| 2019 | Taro the Fool | Sugio | | |
| 2019 | Journey of the Sky Goddess | | | |
| 2020 | Silent Rain | Yukisuke | Lead role | |
| 2020 | From Today, It's My Turn!! | Katsutoshi Imai | | |
| 2020 | All the Things We Never Said | | Lead role | |
| 2020 | #HandballStrive | Aniue | | |
| 2020 | Any Crybabies Around? | Tasuku | Lead role | |
| 2020 | Mother | Keiichi Akagawa | | |
| 2020 | My Favorite Girl | | | |
| 2021 | Under the Open Sky | Ryūtarō Tsunoda | | |
| 2021 | In Those Days | Kozumin | | |
| 2021 | Onoda: 10,000 Nights in the Jungle | Norio Suzuki | | |
| 2022 | A Man | | | |
| 2022 | It's All My Fault | Kataoka | | |
| 2023 | We're Millennials. Got a Problem?: The Movie | Hiromu Yamagishi | | |
| 2023 | Masked Hearts | Ochiai | | |
| 2024 | The Beast of Comedy | Nishidera | | |
| 2024 | After the Fever | Kenta | | |
| 2024 | April Come She Will | Tasuku | | |
| 2024 | 11 Rebels | Washio Heishirō | Lead role | |
| 2024 | The Real You | Iphy | | |
| 2024 | Saint Young Men: The Movie | Ekādaśamukha | | |
| 2024 | At the Bench | | Lead role; anthology film | |
| 2026 | Street Kingdom | Michio | | |
| 2026 | Sukiyaki | Kyu Sakamoto | | |
| 2026 | The Secret Battlefield | Shigeo Kabashima | | |
| 2027 | The Tiger and Her Wings: The Movie | Yūzō Sada | | |

=== Television drama ===
| Year | Title | Role | Notes | Ref(s) |
|---|---|---|---|---|
| 2007 | Fūrin Kazan | Tatsuwakamaru | Taiga drama | |
| 2009 | Tenchijin | Naoe Kageaki | Taiga drama | |
| 2011 | Gō | Toyotomi Hideyori | Taiga drama | |
| 2015 | Koinaka | Kohei Kanazawa | | |
| 2015 | Chō Gentei Nōryoku | Mubeshu Saito | | |
| 2016 | We're Millennials Got a Problem? | Hiromu Yamagishi | | |
| 2016 | Brass Dreams | Kinya Takamoku | | |
| 2019 | Idaten | Masaru Komatsu | Taiga drama | |
| 2020 | Daddy is My Classmate | Izawa | Episode 3, cameo | |
| 2020 | I Had a Dream of That Girl | Ryota Yamasato | Lead role | |
| 2020 | A Warmed Up Love | Makoto Shintani | | |
| 2021 | Ryūkō Kanbō | Negishi | Television film | |
| 2021 | Life's Punchline | Junpei Minowa | | |
| 2021 | #Family Wanted | Sosuke Koyamauchi | | |
| 2021 | Bullets, Bones and Blocked Noses | Watari | Miniseries | |
| 2022 | A Day-Off of Ryunosuke Kamiki | Kenchi Yoshida | Episode 8 | |
| 2022 | Love with a Case | Haruhi Mabuchi | Lead role | |
| 2022 | Lost Man Found | Satoru Matsudo | Lead role | |
| 2024 | The Tiger and Her Wings | Yūzō Sada | Asadora | |
| 2025 | Simulation: Defeat in the Summer of 1941 | Shigeo Kabashima | Miniseries | |
| 2026 | Brothers in Arms | Toyotomi Hidenaga | Lead role; Taiga drama | |
| 2026 | Did Someone Happen to Mention Me? | Documentary narrator | Cameo | |

=== Other television ===
| Year | Title | Notes | Ref. |
|---|---|---|---|
| 2025 | 76th NHK Kōhaku Uta Gassen | As a judge | |

=== Stage ===
| Year | Title | Role | Notes | Ref(s) |
|---|---|---|---|---|
| 2015 | Musubi no Niwa | Mirai Kondo | | |

== Accolades ==
- 6th Tama Film Awards Best Emerging Actor Award (Hotori no Sakuko, Daily Lives of High School Boys, Jinrō Game, Monsterz, My Man, Sweet Poolside)
- 38th Yokohama Film Festival: Best Newcomer (Destruction Babies) (2017)
- 76th Mainichi Film Awards: Best Supporting Actor (Under the Open Sky) (2022)
- 46th Elan d'or Awards: Newcomer of the Year (2022)
- 64th Blue Ribbon Awards: Best Supporting Actor (2022)
- 46th Yokohama Film Festival: Best Actor (11 Rebels) (2025)
