= My Sunshine (film) =

2024 Japanese sports drama

- Theatrical release poster
- Japanese: ぼくのお日さま
- Directed by: Hiroshi Okuyama
- Written by: Hiroshi Okuyama
- Produced by: Toshikazu Nishigaya
- Starring: Keitatsu Koshiyama; Kiara Nakanishi; Sosuke Ikematsu
- Cinematography: Hiroshi Okuyama
- Edited by: Hiroshi Okuyama
- Music by: Humbert Humbert
- Production company: Tokyo Theaters
- Release dates: 19 May 2024 (Cannes); September 2024 (Japan)
- Running time: 100 minutes
- Country: Japan
- Language: Japanese
- Box office: $467,296

My Sunshine (Japanese: ぼくのお日さま, Hepburn: Boku no Ohisama) is a 2024 Japanese coming-of-age sports drama film written and directed by Hiroshi Okuyama. It stars Keitatsu Koshiyama, Kiara Nakanishi, Sosuke Ikematsu, and Ryuya Wakaba.

The film had its world premiere in the Un Certain Regard section of the 2024 Cannes Film Festival on 19 May.

== Plot ==
Takuya is a young boy that appears listless during baseball and hockey practices. After a hockey match where he plays as the goalie, he is enraptured by Sakura, a young girl practicing figure skating. Takuya begins attempting spirals and spins in his hockey skates and is noticed by Arakawa, Sakura's coach and former competitive figure skater. Arakawa lends Takuya his old figure skates and begins providing him free lessons.

Arakawa visits a gas station, where his lover Igarashi works. At their home, Igarashi remarks that Arakawa is talking about skating again and appears happier after beginning to coach Takuya. As Takuya improves, Arakawa suggests Takuya and Sakura skate as an ice dance pair. Sakura was originally coached by Arakawa for women's singles figure skating, and is initially apprehensive. They begin learning the Dutch waltz, with the intention of attending the upcoming badge test. After visiting a frozen lake to practice, the three become closer in their pursuit, and the pair successfully learns the pattern dance.

While walking, Sakura happens to see Arakawa and Igarashi sharing a popsicle in his car. She then privately questions Arakawa on his motives for teaching Takuya, and expresses disgust towards him. At the badge test, Takuya and Arakawa wait for Sakura, but she does not arrive. Sakura's mother terminates lessons with Arakawa and states that Sakura does not intend to stop figure skating, but refuses to be coached by Arakawa and advises he stay away from her. Takuya returns to hockey lessons and Sakura returns to single skating.

Igarashi and Takuya discuss how Igarashi cannot leave his father's business, the gas station, but Igarashi can coach anywhere as he now has no students at the local rink. As spring arrives, Takuya walks home from school in a baggy middle school uniform carrying baseball equipment. Arakawa, driving by, greets Takuya and they drive to the now thawed lake where the three previously practiced. As they play catch, Takuya notices the boxes in Arakawa's car trunk and questions if he is leaving and if he will return. Arakawa states that he unsure and Takuya offers to return his figure skates, but Arakawa says they are a gift.

Takuya later walks towards the rink, holding the figure skates. He encounters Sakura walking from the rink, having previously just practiced her single program to part of Clair de lune. The film closes with Takuya about to speak to Sakura.

== Cast ==
- Keitatsu Koshiyama as Takuya
- Kiara Nakanishi as Sakura
- Sosuke Ikematsu as Arakawa
- Ryuya Wakaba as Igarashi
- Yunho as Kosei
- Maho Yamada as Maho Mikami

== Production ==
To garner natural performances, Okuyama did not provide a script to the film's young actors prior to filming. Actors were given the bare minimum dialogue once on set and asked to improvise the rest of their lines.

== Release ==
The film premiered in the Un Certain Regard program at the 2024 Cannes Film Festival, where it was named as a nominee for the Queer Palm.

It was also invited at the 29th Busan International Film Festival in 'Special program in focus' Teenage Minds, Teenage Movies section and it will be screened in October 2024.

== Reception ==
=== Critical reception ===
The film holds a 91% "Fresh" score on review aggregator Rotten Tomatoes, based on 11 reviews with an average rating of 8.5/10. Pete Hammond of Deadline characterized My Sunshine as a "quiet and lilting charmer of a coming-of-age story."

=== Accolades ===
Award	Ceremony date	Category	Recipient(s)	Result	Ref.
Cannes Film Festival	24 May 2024	Un Certain Regard	My Sunshine	Nominated	
Cannes Film Festival	25 May 2024	Queer Palm	My Sunshine	Nominated	
QCinema International Film Festival	13 November 2024	RainbowQC – Special Mention	My Sunshine	Won	
Hochi Film Awards	16 December 2024	Best New Artist	Keitatsu Koshiyama	Won	
Hochi Film Awards	16 December 2024	Best New Artist	Kiara Nakanish	Won	
Yokohama Film Festival	2 February 2025	Yoshimitsu Morita Memorial Best New Director	Hiroshi Okuyama	Won	
Yokohama Film Festival	2 February 2025	Best Supporting Actor	Sosuke Ikematsu	Won	
Yokohama Film Festival	2 February 2025	Best Newcomer	Keitatsu Koshiyama	Won	
Blue Ribbon Awards	February 2025	Best Supporting Actor	Sosuke Ikematsu	Nominated	
Blue Ribbon Awards	February 2025	Best Newcomer	Keitatsu Koshiyama	Nominated	
Blue Ribbon Awards	February 2025	Best Newcomer	Kiara Nakanishi	Nominated	
Mainichi Film Awards	13 February 2025	Best Supporting Performance	Sosuke Ikematsu	Won	
Mainichi Film Awards	13 February 2025	Best Newcomer	Keitatsu Koshiyama	Won	
Japan Academy Film Prize	14 March 2025	Newcomer of the Year	Keitatsu Koshiyama	Won	
Asian Film Awards	16 March 2025	Best Supporting Actor	Sosuke Ikematsu	Nominated	
