= Sho Miyake =

Japanese director

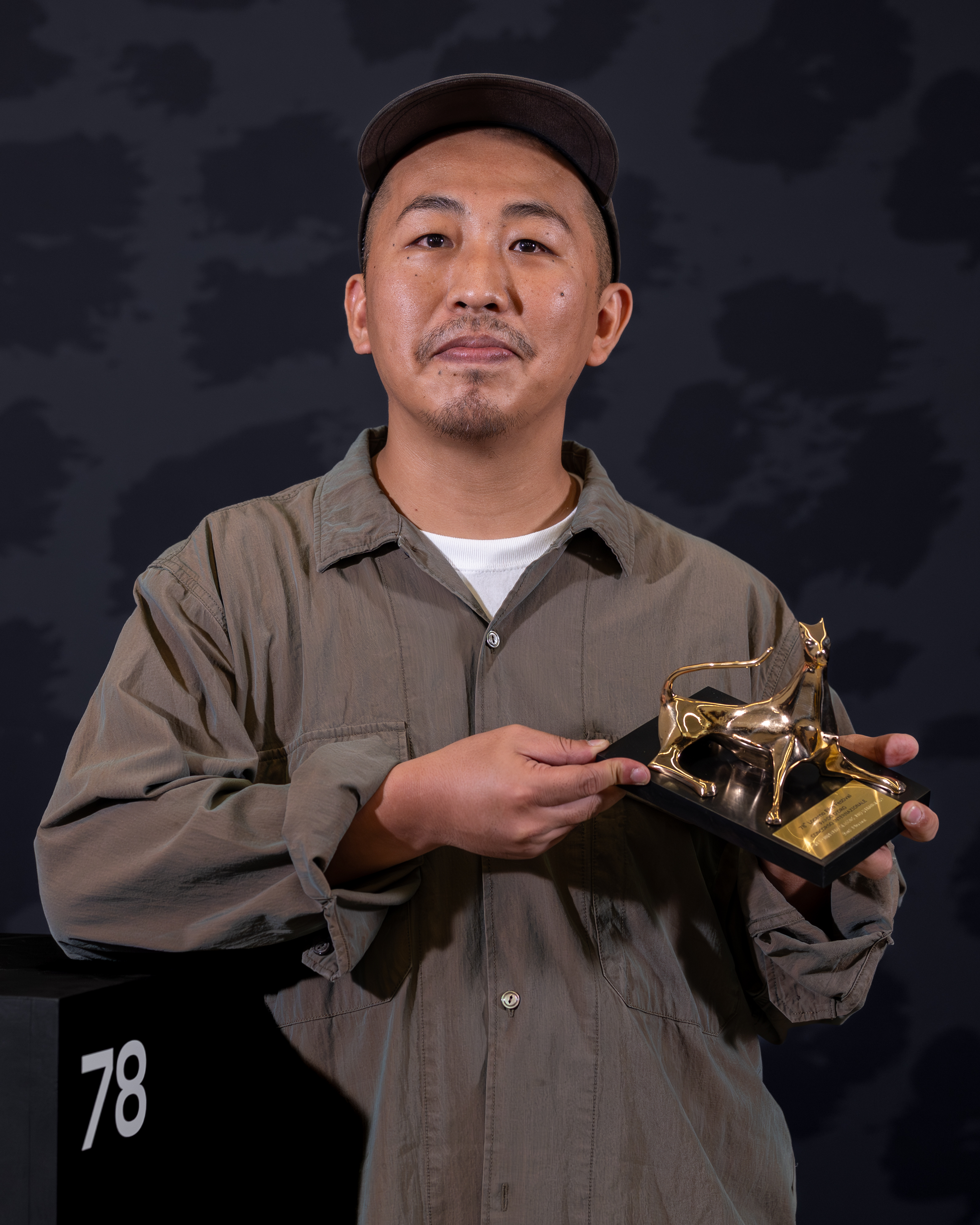
- Miyake in 2025
- Born: 18 July 1984 (age 42); Sapporo, Japan
- Occupation: Director
- Years active: 2012–present

Sho Miyake (三宅 唱, Miyake Shō; born July 18, 1984) is a Japanese director. In 2025, he won the Golden Leopard at the Locarno Film Festival for his film Two Seasons, Two Strangers.

== Career ==
In 2012, Miyake's first feature film, Playback, premiered at the Locarno Film Festival. He then made "A good number of features, shorts, music videos, and television episode" before finding international acclaim with his 2022 feature film, Small, Slow But Steady, an adaptation of a memoir by the deaf boxer Keiko Ogasawara.

In 2024, All the Long Nights, directed by Miyake, and based on the novel Everything at Dawn by Maiko Seo had its world premiere at the 74th Berlin Film Festival.

=== Two Seasons, Two Strangers ===
In 2025, Miyake's Two Seasons, Two Strangers, a remixing of two stories by mangaka Yoshiharu Tsuge, won the Golden Leopard at the Locarno Film Festival. At the International Film Festival of Kerala, it won the Suvarna Chakoram for best film; the judges noted its “exploratory, subtle, beautiful, and thought-provoking cinematic expression of human relationships set within the natural world.”

The South China Morning Post called the film "both fascinating and beautiful," and IndieWire called Miyake "one of the finest, most soulful Japanese filmmakers of his generation."

Miyake had started developing the film in 2020. Originally, he struggled with adapting manga to film, but "The breakthrough came" with Miyake's casting of Shim Eun-kyung as a central character. During principal photography, summer scenes were shot in Kōzu-shima, and winter scenes were shot in Shōnai, Yamagata.

== Filmography ==
- Playback (2012)
- And Your Bird Can Sing (2018)
- Small, Slow But Steady (2022)
- All the Long Nights (2024)
- Two Seasons, Two Strangers (2025)
