= 11 Rebels =

2024 film directed by Kazuya Shiraishi

11 rebels
- Promotional film poster

Japanese name
- Kanji: 十一人の賊軍
- Directed by: Kazuya Shiraishi
- Screenplay by: Ikegami Junya
- Story by: Kasahara Kazuo
- Produced by: Daisuke Takahashi
- Starring: Takayuki Yamada; Taiga Nakano; Hiroshi Tamaki; Sadao Abe
- Cinematography: Naoya Ikeda
- Edited by: Hitami Kato
- Music by: Matsumura Kenta
- Production company: Toei Kyoto Studios
- Distributed by: Toei
- Release dates: 28 October 2024 (Tokyo); 1 November 2024 (Japan)
- Country: Japan
- Language: Japanese
- Box office: $1.6 million

11 Rebels (Japanese: 十一人の賊軍) is a 2024 Japanese samurai, period action film directed by Kazuya Shiraishi, starring Takayuki Yamada and Taiga Nakano. The film had its world premiere at the 37th Tokyo International Film Festival as opening film with screening on October 28, 2024.

== Synopsis ==
The Mizoguchi clan's historic betrayal in Niigata occurred during the intense Boshin War, Japan's most ferocious conflict. The story follows an 11-member suicide squad on a desperate mission to defend a fortress. As the Mizoguchi clan, the old shogunate, and the new government clash, their heroic struggle unfolds.

== Cast ==
- Takayuki Yamada as Masa
- Taiga Nakano as Washio Heishirō
- Onoe Ukon II as Akatan
- Riho Sayashi as Natsu
- Takara Sakumoto as Noro
- Seiji Chihara as Indō
- Amane Okayama as Oroshiya
- Yūya Matsuura as Sanzu
- Hayate Ichinose as Nimaime
- Ryōta Oyanagi as Tsujigiri
- Chikara Motoyama as old man
- Shūhei Nomura as Irie Kazuma
- Takuma Otoo as Sengoku Zen'emon
- Shunsuke Tanaka
- Satoru Matsuo
- Fuga Shibazaki
- Goro Sato
- Hisashi Yoshizawa
- Taro Suruga
- Yōhei Matsukado as Irobe Nagato
- Kōdai Asaka
- Kazuma Sano
- Hirokio Andō
- Gaku Sano
- Nadal
- Mai Kiryu
- Eri Nagai
- Naomi Nishida
- Hiroshi Tamaki as Yamagata Kyōsuke
- Sadao Abe as Mizoguchi Takumi

== Production ==
The original script was written by Kazuo Kasahara in 1964. However, Shigeru Okada, the head of Toei Kyoto Studio, was dissatisfied with the ending, so the project was shelved. Sixty years later, the script was finally brought to life on screen, directed by Kazuya Shiraishi.

== Release ==
The film was invited at the 37th Tokyo International Film Festival as opening film where it had its world premiere on October 28, 2024. It had already secured theatrical distribution in North America.

The film was released in the Japanese theatres on 1 November 2024.

== Reception ==
Wendy Ide, reviewing the movie for Screen Daily, gave 11 Rebels a positive review. "A small army of highly marketable heart-throb actors toplined by Yamada Takayuki and Nakano Taiga." Closing review Ide wrote, The film focuses on its intense and violent action scenes, rather than subtlety. Ide added, It excels in its production quality, showcasing impressive design work and beautifully rendered 19th-century Japanese architecture amid the extensive bloodshed.

=== Accolades ===
The film featured at no. 10 in the list of top 10 Japanese films of 2024 at the Yokohama Film Festival.

Award	Ceremony date	Category	Recipient(s)	Result	Ref.
Mainichi Film Awards	17 January 2025	Mainichi Film Award for Best Cinematography	Naoya Ikeda	Won	
Mainichi Film Awards	17 January 2025	Mainichi Film Award for Best Sound Recording	Tomoharu Urata	Won	
Yokohama Film Festival	2 February 2025	Best Actor	Taiga Nakano	Won	
Japan Academy Film Prize	14 March 2025	Best Art Direction	Masazumi Okihara	Nominated	
Japan Academy Film Prize	14 March 2025	Best Sound Recording	Tomoharu Urata	Nominated	
