= Jun Saitō =

Japanese actor (born 2007)

- 齋藤 潤
- Born: June 11, 2007 (age 19); Kanagawa Prefecture, Japan
- Occupation: Actor
- Years active: 2020–present
- Known for: Neko-kare as Nagisa Tono; Let's Go Karaoke! as Satomi Oka
- Relatives: Tetsuo Nakanishi (uncle)

Jun Saitō (齋藤 潤, Saitō Jun; born June 11, 2007) is a Japanese actor.

== Biography ==
He began his career at the age of twelve, right after he was selected as the male grand prix winner of the 5th Theatre Academy Model Grand Prix's youth division.

== Personal life ==
He is the nephew of former football player Tetsuo Nakanishi. His hobbies and special skills are soccer and action.

== Filmography ==
=== Film ===
Year	Title	Role	Notes	Ref.
2023	(Ab)normal Desire	Yoshimichi Sasaki (young)		
2024	Teasing Master Takagi-san Movie	Ryo Machida		
2024	Let's Go Karaoke!	Satomi Oka		
2024	Confetti	Ken		
2025	366 Days	Kotaro Kinjiro		
2025	Shinji Muroi: Not Defeated	Takahito Mori		
2025	Shinji Muroi: Stay Alive	Takahito Mori		
2025	Strawberry Moon	Hinata Sato		
2026	Labyrinth	Kento Yamada (voice)		
2026	Part-time Death Angel	The dead young man		
2026	Bayside Shakedown: N.E.W	Takahito Mori		
2027	The High School Family	Kotaro Ietani		

=== Television ===
Year	Title	Role	Notes	Ref.
2023	Neko-kare: Keeping a Boy	Nagisa Tono		
2025	Chihayafuru: Full Circle	Fuki Shirano		
2026	Jaadugar: A Witch in Mongolia	Muhammad (voice)		
2027	The Shogunate Rebel	Oguri Tadamichi	Taiga drama	

== Accolades ==
Year	Award	Category	Nominated work(s)	Result	Ref.
2024	16th Tama Film Awards	Best New Actor	Let's Go Karaoke!, Confetti, Teasing Master Takagi-san Movie and (Ab)normal Desire	Won	
2024	34th Japanese Movie Critics Awards	Best New Actor	Let's Go Karaoke	Won	
2024	37th Nikkan Sports Film Awards	Yūjirō Ishihara Newcomer Award	Let's Go Karaoke!, Confetti, Shinji Muroi: Not Defeated and Shinji Muroi: Stay Alive	Won	
2025	46th Yokohama Film Festival	Best Newcomer	Let's Go Karaoke!, Confetti, Teasing Master Takagi-san Movie	Won	
2025	48th Japan Academy Film Prize	Best New Actor	Let's Go Karaoke!	Won	
