= All the Long Nights =

2024 Japanese film by Miyake Sho

- Theatrical release poster

Japanese name
- Kana: 夜明けのすべて
Transcriptions
- Revised Hepburn: Yoake no Subete
- Directed by: Sho Miyake
- Written by: Sho Miyake; Kiyoto Wada
- Based on: Everything at Dawn by Maiko Seo
- Produced by: Masayoshi Jonai
- Starring: Hokuto Matsumura; Mone Kamishiraishi
- Cinematography: Yuta Shukinaga
- Edited by: Keiko Ogawa
- Music by: Hi'Spec
- Production companies: Toho; Asmik Ace
- Distributed by: Bandai Namco Filmworks; Asmik Ace
- Release dates: 21 February 2024 (Berlin); 9 February 2024 (Japan)
- Running time: 119 minutes
- Country: Japan
- Language: Japanese

All the Long Nights (Japanese: 夜明けのすべて, Hepburn: Yoake no Subete) is a 2024 Japanese drama film directed by Sho Miyake, based on the novel of the same name by Maiko Seo. The film stars Mone Kamishiraishi as Misa Fujisawa, a woman struggling with severe premenstrual syndrome (PMS) that causes mood swings and irritability, and Hokuto Matsumura as Takatoshi Yamazoe, a man dealing with panic disorder.

The film had its world premiere at the Forum section of the 74th Berlin Film Festival on 17 February 2024. It was theatrically released in Japan on 9 February 2024 by Toho.

== Plot ==
All the Long Nights follows Takatoshi Yamazoe (Hokuto Matsumura), who struggles with panic disorder and social withdrawal, and Misa Fujisawa (Mone Kamishiraishi), who experiences severe mood swings caused by PMS. After an incident at work, they begin to understand each other’s difficulties and form an unexpected connection. Through their daily conversations and small acts of kindness, they start finding ways to live with their conditions and regain a sense of hope. The film gently explores how two people who share similar pain can bring light into each other’s lives, showing a bond that isn’t defined by romance or friendship but by mutual understanding.

== Cast ==
- Hokuto Matsumura as Takatoshi Yamazoe
- Mone Kamishiraishi as Misa Fujisawa
- Ken Mitsuishi as Kurita Kazuo
- Ryō as Fujisawa Noriko
- Kiyohiko Shibukawa as Norihiko Tsujimoto
- Haruka Imou as Chihiro Oshima
- Sawako Fujima as Manami Iwata

== Release ==
All the Long Nights had its World Premiere at the 74th Berlin Film Festival on 17 February 2024, and competed for Forum Section. It was also the closing film of the 48th Hong Kong International Film Festival on 28 March 2024.

The film was featured in Neon section of the 7th Malaysia International Film Festival on 21 July 2024. The film have been shortlisted for the Tiantan awards at the 14th Beijing International Film Festival on 20 April 2024.

The film opened the 25th Jeonju International Film Festival on 1 May 2024.

== Reception ==
Jessica Kiang of Variety described the film as "A gently luminous follow-up to his youth drama And Your Bird Can Sing, Sho Miyake’s All the Long Nights takes what looks like an opposites-attract setup and turns it into a rumination on the quest for direction and personal happiness".

The Japan Times's Mark Schilling rated the film four out of five stars, writing that "the chemistry between Kamishiraishi and Matsumura [...] creates a mood of radiant warmth and joy".

== Accolades ==
Year	Award	Category	Recipient(s)	Result	Ref(s)
2024	14th Beijing International Film Festival	Best Artistic Contribution	All the Long Nights	Won	
2024	3rd Women's Journalist Film Award	Best Actor	Hokuto Matsumura	Won	
2024	16th Tama Film Awards	Best Picture	All the Long Nights	Won	
2024	16th Tama Film Awards	Best New Actor	Hokuto Matsumura	Won	
2024	37th Nikkan Sports Film Awards	Fans' Choice Award for Best Film	All the Long Nights	Won	
2024	37th Nikkan Sports Film Awards	Fans' Choice Award for Best Actor	Hokuto Matsumura	Won	
2024	46th Yokohama Film Festival	Best Picture	All the Long Nights	Won	
2025	48th Japan Academy Film Prize	Best Film	All the Long Nights	Nominated	
2025	48th Japan Academy Film Prize	Best Director	Sho Miyake	Nominated	
2025	48th Japan Academy Film Prize	Best Actress	Mone Kamishiraishi	Nominated	
2025	98th Kinema Junpo Awards	Best Film	All the Long Nights	Won	
2025	98th Kinema Junpo Awards	Best Director	Sho Miyake	Won	
2025	98th Kinema Junpo Awards	Best Actor	Hokuto Matsumura	Won	
2025	79th Mainichi Film Awards	Best Film	All the Long Nights	Won	
2025	79th Mainichi Film Awards	Best Director	Sho Miyake	Won	
2025	79th Mainichi Film Awards	Best Actress	Mone Kamishiraishi	Nominated	
2025	79th Mainichi Film Awards	Best Cinematography	Yuta Tsukinaga	Nominated	
2025	79th Mainichi Film Awards	Best Screenplay	Sho Miyake	Nominated	
2025	79th Mainichi Film Awards	Best Music	Hi'Spec	Nominated	
2025	79th Mainichi Film Awards	Best Sound Recording	Kawai Takamitsu	Nominated	
2025	18th Asian Film Awards	Best Supporting Actor	Ken Mitsuishi	Nominated	
