= Amane Okayama =

Japanese actor (born 1994)

- 岡山 天音
- Born: June 17, 1994 (age 32); Tokyo, Japan
- Occupation: Actor
- Years active: 2009–present
- Agent: Humanité

Amane Okayama (岡山 天音, Okayama Amane; born June 17, 1994) is a Japanese actor who won the best new actor award in the 32nd Takasaki film festival in 2018 for his role in the comedy drama, Poetry Angel (2017). He is represented by the talent agency, Humanité. He was born in Tokyo.

== Biography ==
Okayama debuted in 2009. His acting debut was in the drama, Chūgakusei Nikki. He used the name of the character he played in this drama as his stage name.

Okayama made many successes in films and television series in 2011. He appeared in the films Happy Together: All About My Dog, A Liar and a Broken Girl, and the Fuji TV drama, You Taught Me All the Precious Things.

Okayama's specialty is painting and hobby is dancing.

== Filmography ==
=== TV series ===
Year	Title	Role	Notes	Ref.
2011	Chūgakusei Nikki	Amane Okayama		
2021	A Story of "Grappler Baki" and Me	Kohei Takeno		
2021	Bullets, Bones and Blocked Noses		Miniseries	
2022	Don't Call It Mystery	Rokuta Orito	Episodes 6, 7 and 10	
2023	At Least On Sunday Night	Mine Ichikawa		
2024	Light of My Lion	X		
2024–27	Unmet: A Neurosurgeon's Diary	Kaede Ayano	2 seasons	
2025	Unbound	Koikawa Harumachi	Taiga drama	
2025	Hirayasumi	Hiroto Ikuta	Lead role	
2026	Kataomoi	Kenji "Kenken"	Miniseries	
2026	Sounds of Winter	Kotaro Hayase		
2027	Mawaru Swan	Takuya Yamada	Asadora	

=== Films ===
Year	Title	Role	Notes	Ref.
2013	Intermission	Amane		
2013	Jinrō Game	Seiichiro Choson		
2013	My Little Sweet Pea	Senzo Asou		
2015	Chocolietta	Tomo Mihashi		
2015	Gassoh	Teijiro Fukuhara		
2018	Love Disease	Shin-nosuke Nishi		
2019	The Journalist	Daisuke Kuramochi		
2019	Thank you, My Highlight vol.04	Yūsuke	Lead role	
2020	Dance, Mita	Mita	Lead role	
2020	Blue, Painful, Fragile			
2020	Ora, Ora Be Goin' Alone			
2020	Hotel Royal			
2021	Funny Bunny			
2021	We Couldn't Become Adults	Taniguchi		
2022	Kingdom 2: Far and Away	Wei Ping		
2022	The Fish Tale	Momiyama		
2022	A Hundred Flowers			
2022	Silent Parade	Tomoya Takagaki		
2022	Leave in Summer	Shuntarō Fujii		
2023	Blue Giant	Shunji Tamada (voice)		
2023	In Love and Deep Water			
2023	Kingdom 3: The Flame of Destiny	Wei Ping		
2024	The Beast of Comedy	Takayuki Tsuchiya	Lead role	
2024	In an Isolated Cottage on a Snowy Mountain	Yoshio Tadokoro		
2024	Kingdom 4: Return of the Great General	Wei Ping		
2024	Cloud	Miyake		
2024	11 Rebels	Oroshiya		
2024	At the Bench		Lead role; anthology film	
2025	Under Ninja	Saruta		
2025	Gosh!!			
2025	#Iwilltellyouthetruth			
2026	Kingdom 5: The Clash of Souls	Wei Ping		
2026	We Are Aliens	Kyotaro (voice)	Lead role	

== Awards and nominations ==
Year	Award	Category	Work(s)	Result	Ref.
2026	50th Elan d'or Awards	Elan d'or Award	Himself	Won	
