= Hiroshi Okuyama =

Japanese filmmaker (born 1996)

- 奥山 大史
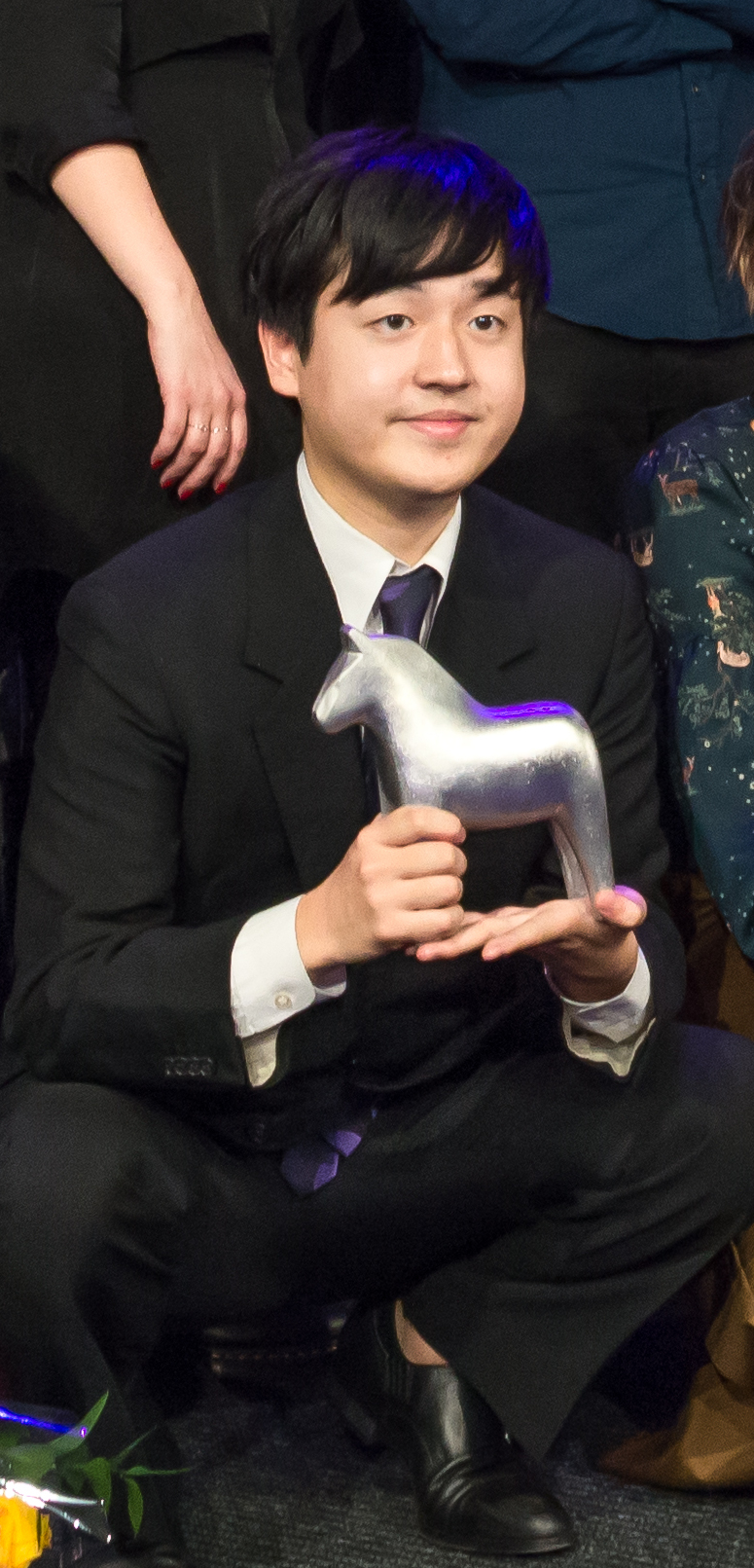
- Hiroshi Okuyama at Stockholm international Film Festival 2018
- Born: 1996 (age 29–30); Tokyo, Japan
- Education: Aoyama Gakuin University
- Occupation: Film director

Japanese name
- Kanji: 奥山 大史
Transcriptions
- Romanization: Okuyama Hiroshi

Hiroshi Okuyama (奥山 大史, Okuyama Hiroshi; born 1996) is a Japanese film director.

== Career ==
While a senior at Aoyama Gakuin University, Okuyama wrote, directed, and served as cinematographer and editor on the feature film Jesus, which depicts Jesus Christ as the imaginary friend of a grade schooler. The film debuted at the 2018 San Sebastián International Film Festival, where Okuyama was recognized with the Kutxabank-New Directors Award.

In reviews for Jesus, critics noted the influence of Hirokazu Kore-eda on Okuyama's filmmaking. Okuyama would later collaborate with Kore-eda by directing episodes of the latter's Netflix series The Makanai: Cooking for the Maiko House.

Okuyama's second feature film, My Sunshine premiered in the Un Certain Regard portion of the 2024 Cannes Film Festival. The film follows the personal lives of ice skaters throughout the winter season.

== Filmography ==
=== Film ===
| Year | Title | Notes | Ref. |
|---|---|---|---|
| 2018 | Jesus | —N/a | |
| 2024 | My Sunshine | —N/a | |

=== Television ===
| Year | Title | Notes | Ref. |
|---|---|---|---|
| 2023 | The Makanai: Cooking for the Maiko House | Directed episodes alongside Hirokazu Kore-eda, Megumi Tsuno, and Takuma Sato | |
| 2024 | Yuming Stories: "Spring Comes" | —N/a | |

=== Music video ===
| Year | Title | Notes | Ref. |
|---|---|---|---|
| 2019 | AI Hibari Misora - Arekara (あれから) | Director, cinematographer, editing | |
| 2020 | Nana Mori - Smile | Director, cinematographer, editing | |
| 2020 | Kenshi Yonezu - Canary | Cinematographer | |
| 2021 | Nogizaka46 - Boku wa Boku o Suki ni Naru | Director | |
| 2021 | Gen Hoshino - Create | Cinematographer | |
| 2023 | Kenshi Yonezu - Spinning Globe | Director, cinematographer, editing | |
| 2025 | Humbert Humbert - In the Dark | Director, cinematographer, editing | |
| 2025 | Kenshi Yonezu - Bow and Arrow | Cinematographer | |

== Awards and nominations ==
| Year | Award | Category | Nominated work | Result | Ref. |
|---|---|---|---|---|---|
| 2018 | San Sebastián International Film Festival | Kutxabank-New Directors Award | Jesus | Won | |
| 2018 | International Film Festival & Awards Macao | Best Film | Jesus | Nominated | |
| 2018 | Stockholm International Film Festival | Best Film | Jesus | Nominated | |
| 2018 | Stockholm International Film Festival | Best Cinematography | Jesus | Won | |
| 2019 | Dublin International Film Festival | Dublin Film Critics Circle Award for Best Cinematography | Jesus | Won | |
| 2024 | Cannes Film Festival | Un Certain Regard | My Sunshine | Nominated | |
| 2024 | Cannes Film Festival | Queer Palm | My Sunshine | Nominated | |
