= Rikiya Imaizumi =

Japanese filmmaker (born 1981)

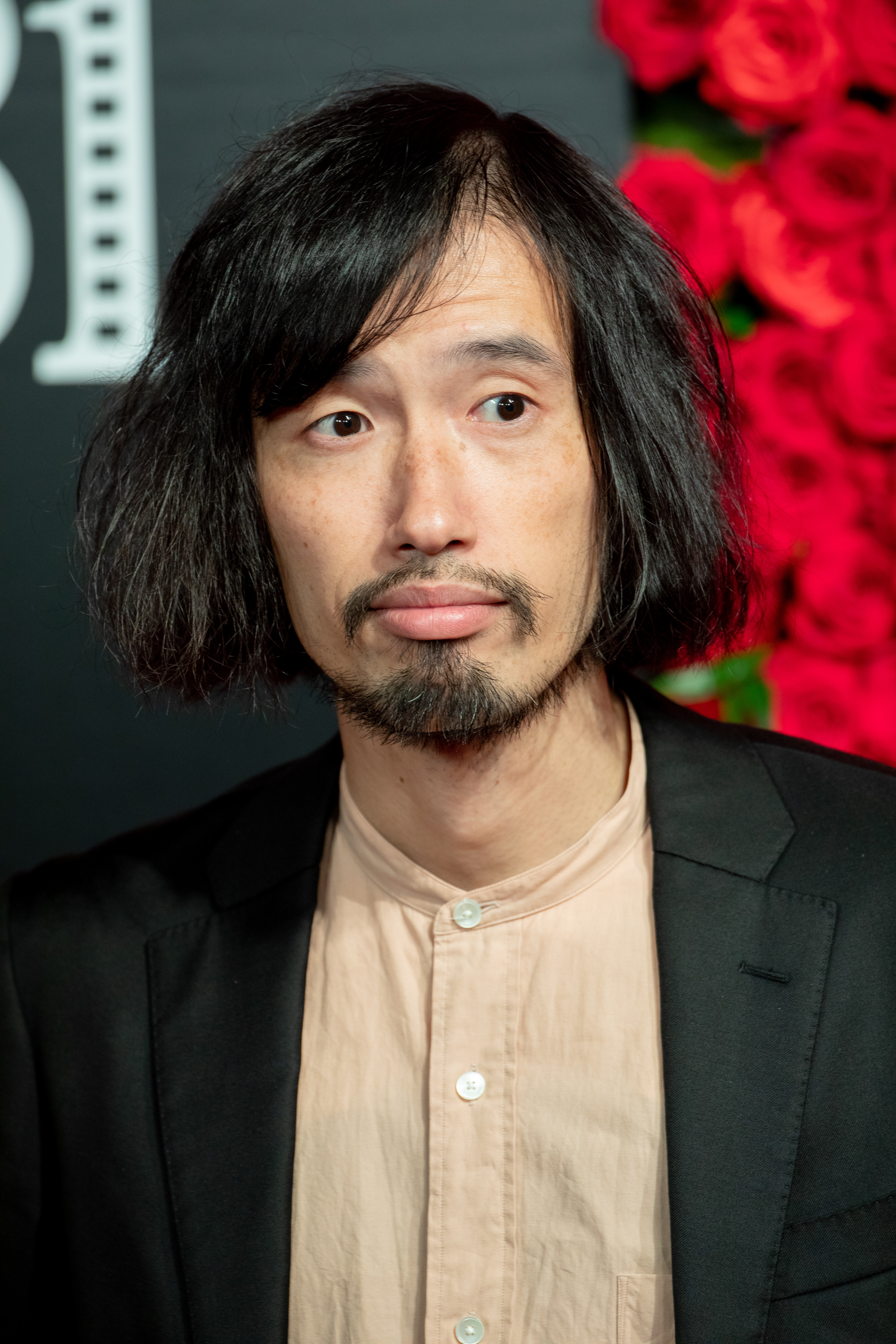
- Imaizumi at the 31st Tokyo International Film Festival in 2018
- Born: February 1, 1981 (age 45); Kōriyama, Fukushima, Japan
- Occupation: Film director
- Years active: 2005–present
- Spouse: Kaori Imaizumi

Rikiya Imaizumi (今泉 力哉, Imaizumi Rikiya; born 1 February 1981) is a Japanese film director.

== Filmography ==
=== Film ===
Year	Title	Role	Notes	Ref.
2010	A Film of Tama	Director and cinematographer	Documentary	
2011	It's Over Now	Director and writer		
2012	I Catch a Terrible Cat	Director and writer		
2013	Sad Tea	Director and writer		
2014	Sister Game	Director and writer		
2016	Their Distance	Director and writer		
2017	Same Old, Same Old	Director and writer		
2018	Our Blue Moment	Director and writer		
2019	Just Only Love	Director and writer		
2019	Little Nights, Little Love	Director		
2020	Mellow	Director and writer		
2020	His	Director		
2021	Over the Town	Director and writer		
2021	In Those Days	Director		
2021	Skeleton Flowers	Director and writer		
2022	Love Nonetheless	Writer		
2022	Straying	Director		
2022	By the Window	Director and writer		
2023	Call Me Chihiro	Director and writer		
2023	Undercurrent	Director and writer		
2024	Teasing Master Takagi-san Movie	Director and writer		

=== TV series ===
Year	Title	Role	Notes	Ref.
2014	Sailor Zombie	Director	Episodes 4, 5, 6 and 8	
2019	Time Limit Investigator 2019	Director	Episodes 3 and 7	
2020	A Day-Off of Kasumi Arimura	Director	Episodes 2 and 6	
2023	A Day-Off of Hana Sugisaki	Director	Episodes 2 and 3	
2024	1122: For a Happy Marriage	Director		
2024	Teasing Master Takagi-san	Director and writer		
2026	Sounds of Winter	Director and writer		
2026	Chloe et Emma	Director and writer	Miniseries	
