= Yuna Taira =

Japanese actress (born 1998)

- 平 祐奈
- Taira at the 39th Tokyo International Film Festival
- Born: November 12, 1998 (age 27); Kobe, Hyōgo Prefecture, Japan
- Occupation: Actress
- Years active: 2011 - present
- Relatives: Airi Taira (sister); Keishō Taira (brother); Yuto Nagatomo (brother-in-law)
- Website: Official website

Yuna Taira (平 祐奈, Taira Yūna; born November 12, 1998) is a Japanese actress.

== Biography ==
Taira was born in Kobe, Hyōgo Prefecture, and grew up in Akashi, Hyōgo. She was in the sixth grade at elementary school when her mother and grandmother applied for her to be in the film I Wish. She passed the audition and debuted as an actress.

Taira made regular appearances in NHK Educational TV's R no Hōsoku. She was in Contact Girl Ju Ju Ju from Oha Suta Super Live and released a CD. She starred in the film Scarecrow and Racket: Aki and Tamako's Summer Vacation.

== Filmography ==
=== Television ===
Year	Title	Role	Notes	Ref.
2011	Kurumi no Heya	Sakura Mitamura (childhood)	Episode 1	
2012	Going My Home		Episode 2	
2013	Kasukana Kanojo	Enka Kurata		
2014	San-biki no Ossan: Seigi no Mikata, Kenzan!!	Rikako	Episode 7	
2014	Kindaichi Shonen no Jikenbo N (Neo)	Ayaka Hasunuma	Episode 7	
2014	Tadahitotsu no Ai ni Ikita Onna-tachi: Love You Only			
2015	Shokuzai no Someikyoku	Sayuri Shimazu	Episodes 2 and 3	
2015	Ichiro	Suwa	Episodes 3 to 9	
2015	JK is a Yuki-onna	Koyuki Fuyushiro	Lead role	
2016	Myūbu ♪ ~Secret Garden~	Shūko Ikematsu (Ikeko)	Lead role	
2018	Town of Evening Calm, Country of Cherry Blossoms	Fūko Ishikawa		
2018	Scary Story That Really Happened "Woman Who Possesses a Lost Road"	Hatsumi Kaneko	Lead role	
2018	Inugami Family	Miyo		
2019	Drone Drama "Onagawa: Slope of Life"	Saki	Lead role	
2019	Scion Boys	Mugi Aihara	Lead role	
2019	Mada Kekkon Dekinai Otoko	Yumi Nakagawa		
2024	Omusubi	Kasumi Yugami	Asadora	
2025	Since I Took You Away	Ririko Yuki		

=== Film ===
Year	Title	Role	Notes	Ref.
2011	I Wish	Yuna Taira		
2012	Sadako 3D	young Akane Ayukawa		
2014	GameCenter CX The Movie 1986 Mighty Bomb Jack	Kumiko Kinoshita		
2014	Pale Moon	Rika Umezawa (middle school)		
2015	Blue Demon ver.2.0	Anna		
2015	Solomon's Perjury Part 1: Suspicion	Saeko		
2015	Solomon's Perjury Part 2: Judgement	Saeko		
2015	Scarecrow and Racket: Aki and Tamako's Summer Vacation	Aki	Lead role	
2016	Yell for the Blue Sky	Akane Sawa		
2017	Kiseki: Sobito of That Day	Yui Sakurai		
2017	Closest Love To Heaven	Rei Uchida		
2017	Mumon: The Land of Stealth	Rin Kitabatake		
2017	The Dark Maidens	Mirei Nitani		
2017	Sagrada Reset Reset Part 1	Sumire Sōma		
2017	Sagrada Reset Reset Part 2	Sumire Sōma		
2017	ReLIFE	Chizuru Hishiro	Lead role	
2017	Shashin Koshien Summer in 0.5 Seconds	legendary girl		
2017	Teen Bride	Karin Oriyama	Lead role	
2018	Honey	Nao Kogure	Lead role	
2018	Rin	Sana		
2020	One in a Hundred Thousand	Rino Sakuragi	Lead role	
2022	That Disappearance		Filmed in 2018	
2022	Love Is Light	Shinonome		
2024	Teasing Master Takagi-san Movie	Mano		
2025	Nemurubaka: Hypnic Jerks	Ruka Kujirai	Lead role	

== Awards ==
Year	Award	Category	Work(s)	Result	Ref.
2023	44th Yokohama Film Festival	Best Newcomer	Love Is Light	Won	
