= Teasing Master Takagi-san Movie =

2024 Japanese film by Rikiya Imaizumi

- Theatrical release poster
- Kanji: 映画 からかい上手の高木さん
- Revised Hepburn: Eiga Karakai Jōzu no Takagi-san
- Directed by: Rikiya Imaizumi
- Screenplay by: Tomoki Kanazawa; Jun Hagimori; Rikiya Imaizumi
- Based on: Teasing Master Takagi-san by Sōichirō Yamamoto
- Produced by: Yuki Osawa; Masayuki Morikawa
- Starring: Mei Nagano; Fumiya Takahashi; Jin Suzuki; Yuna Taira; Oshirō Maeda; Sara Shida; Tamaki Shiratori; Jun Saito; Yōsuke Eguchi
- Music by: Takashi Ohmama
- Production company: Fine Entertainment
- Distributed by: Toho
- Release dates: May 16, 2024 (Tokyo); May 31, 2024 (Japan)
- Running time: 119 minutes
- Country: Japan
- Language: Japanese
- Box office: ¥590 million

Teasing Master Takagi-san Movie (Japanese: 映画 からかい上手の高木さん, Hepburn: Eiga Karakai Jōzu no Takagi-san) is a 2024 Japanese film based on the manga series Teasing Master Takagi-san by Sōichirō Yamamoto and a sequel to the live-action television series adaptation of the manga. Produced by Fine Entertainment and distributed by Toho, the film is directed by Rikiya Imaizumi from an original story he wrote along with Tomoki Kanazawa and Jun Hagimori, and stars Mei Nagano, Fumiya Takahashi, Jin Suzuki, Yuna Taira, Oshirō Maeda, Sara Shida, Tamaki Shiratori, Jun Saito, and Yōsuke Eguchi. It follows Takagi (Nagano) and Nishikata (Takahashi) reuniting 10 years after graduating from middle school.

A live-action film version of the manga series was announced in November 2023, with Imaizumi, Kanazawa, and Hagimori confirming their involvement following their work on the television series adaptation. That month, Nagano and Takahashi were announced for their casting as Takagi and Nishikata, respectively. Additional cast were revealed in February and March 2024. Filming took place at Shōdoshima in Kagawa Prefecture.

Teasing Master Takagi-san Movie premiered in Tokyo on May 16, 2024, and was released in Japan on May 31. The film grossed ¥590 million at the box office.

== Premise ==
Ten years after graduating from Momomi Middle School, (Note: Japanese: 桃見中学校, Hepburn: Momomi Chūgakkō) Takagi returns to Shōdoshima and works at her alma mater as a trainee teacher. She then reunites with Nishikata, who works at the same school as a struggling physical education teacher.

== Cast ==
- Mei Nagano as Takagi: A trainee teacher at Momomi Middle School.
- Fumiya Takahashi as Nishikata: A physical education teacher at Momomi Middle School.
- Jin Suzuki as Nakai: Nishikata's friend in his middle school days who now works as his co-teacher. He is currently engaged to Mano.
- Yuna Taira as Mano: Takagi's friend in her middle school days. She is currently engaged to Nakai.
- Oshirō Maeda as Hamaguchi: Takagi and Nishikata's classmate in their middle school days who has dated Hojo in the past, but they have broken up.
- Sara Shida as Hojo: Takagi and Nishikata's classmate in their middle school days who has broken up with Hamaguchi. She refuses to get back to him despite the pleas.
- Tamaki Shiratori as Miki Ozeki: Nishikata's student who has a crush on her classmate Ryo.
- Jun Saito as Ryo Machida: Nishikata's student who is not always present in class but changes after meeting Takagi. His character was originally created for the film.
- Yōsuke Eguchi as Mr. Tanabe: The vice-principal of Momomi Middle School and former teacher of Takagi and Nishikata.

== Production ==
Shogakukan confirmed in March 2023 that a live-action adaptation of the manga series Teasing Master Takagi-san by Sōichirō Yamamoto was in the works with Rikiya Imaizumi attached as the director, though its format was not specified. That month, Yamamoto stated that casting for the adaptation was in progress. The format was revealed to be a series for television in September 2023. However, in November 2023, a live-action film was also revealed to be in the works and to be distributed by Toho, which would be based on an original story set ten years after the events of the manga. That month, Imaizumi was confirmed to be writing and directing the film along with his co-writers Tomoki Kanazawa and Jun Hagimori, whom he had worked with on the live-action series. Additionally, Mei Nagano and Fumiya Takahashi were cast as Takagi and Nishikata, respectively. Principal photography took place at Shōdoshima in Kagawa Prefecture, the main setting for the manga's anime adaptation.

Additional cast were revelead in February 2024, namely Yōsuke Eguchi as Mr. Tanabe, Jin Suzuki as Nakai, Yuna Taira as Mano, Oshirō Maeda as Hamaguchi, and Sara Shida as Hojo. Eguchi was the only cast from the television series adaptation to reprise their role for the film to "connect" the two works. In March 2024, Tamaki Shiratori and Jun Saito joined the cast as Miki Ozeki and Ryo Machida, respectively. Additionally, Fine Entertainment was credited as the production company, with Yuki Osawa and Masayuki Morikawa serving as producers.

== Music ==
In November 2023, Takashi Ohmama was announced to be composing Teasing Master Takagi-san Movie. In March 2024, Aimer was announced to be performing the theme song for the film titled "Haruka" (遥か; lit. 'Far Away'), which was first used in the live-action series. It was written and composed by Yusuke Tanaka and produced by Kenji Tamai. The song was released digitally in Japan on April 2, 2024. The original soundtrack for the film was released digitally on May 29, 2024.

== Marketing ==
A teaser poster, and a special and TV spot videos, of which the latter featured a narration from Yuki Kaji, Nishikata's Japanese voice actor, for Teasing Master Takagi-san Movie were released in January 2024. A new poster and trailer featuring the theme song were released in March 2024. In May 2024, Shinya Takagi of the Japanese comedy duo Joyman, in collaboration with the film, released a light-hearted rap music on their official YouTube channel.

== Release ==
=== Theatrical ===
Teasing Master Takagi-san Movie had an early screening in Tokyo on May 16, 2024, and was released in Japan on May 31. The film was screened at the Shanghai International Film Festival in Shanghai, China in June 2024, and had its North American premiere at the 28th Fantasia International Film Festival in Montreal, Quebec, Canada on July 28.

=== Home media ===
Teasing Master Takagi-san Movie was released on Blu-ray and DVD, and became available for streaming on U-Next in Japan on November 13, 2024.

== Reception ==
Teasing Master Takagi-san Movie grossed ¥590 million in Japan. In its opening weekend, the film earned ¥167 million and debuted at fifth place in the box office rankings. It earned an additional ¥88.5 million in its second weekend, ranking down to sixth place, and ¥56.2 million in its third weekend, ranking down to seventh. It dropped off the box office rankings in its fourth weekend.
