= List of Kamen Rider Zero-One characters =

The main cast of Kamen Rider Zero-One. From left to right: Jun Fukuzoe, Yua Yaiba, Isamu Fuwa, Aruto Hiden, Is, Jin, and Horobi.

Kamen Rider Zero-One (仮面ライダーゼロワン, Kamen Raidā Zerowan) is a Japanese tokusatsu series that serves as the 30th installment in the Kamen Rider franchise and the first entry in the Reiwa era.

The cast of Kamen Rider Zero-One was announced on July 17, 2019.

== Main characters ==
=== Aruto Hiden ===
Aruto Hiden (飛電 或人, Hiden Aruto) is a kind-hearted failed comedian who is appointed the CEO of Hiden Intelligence following the death of his grandfather, Korenosuke, and inherits the power to become Kamen Rider Zero-One. Though initially reluctant to take on the role, he accepted it after witnessing MetsubouJinrai.net, and later ZAIA Enterprise, threaten the peace between humans and Humagears.

After losing the 5-Round Workplace Competition (お仕事五番勝負, Oshigoto Goban Shōbu) to his corporate rival Gai Amatsu, Aruto secretly downloaded all of the Humagears' personality profiles from the Satellite There (衛星ゼア, Eisei Zea) before they are erased so he can continue the Hiden legacy by creating a new company, Hiden Manufacturing Co., Ltd. (飛電製作所, Hiden Seisakujo). When the malevolent AI Ark arises to destroy humanity, Gai joins forces with Aruto to defeat it; making amends with him by relinquishing control of Hiden Intelligence and returning the company to him along the way. After Horobi destroyed Aruto's secretary, Is, however, the Ark's emissary As gives Aruto the Ark-One Progrise Key, turning him into the Ark's first human host and giving him the power to transform into Kamen Rider Ark-One to seek revenge while retaining partial control over himself. While fighting Horobi however, Soreo reminded him of why he became a Kamen Rider, which gave Aruto the resolve to purge himself and Horobi of the Ark's influence before letting him destroy the Ark-One system; reconciling their differences in the process.

Utilizing the Rising Hopper (ライジングホッパー, Raijingu Hoppā) Progrise Key in conjunction with the Hiden Zero-One Driver (飛電ゼロワンドライバー, Hiden Zerowan Doraibā) belt, along with assistance from the Satellite There, Aruto can transform into Kamen Rider Zero-One. While transformed, he gains superhuman jumping. He also wields the Attache Calibur (アタッシュカリバー, Atasshu Karibā), which can switch between its briefcase-like Attache Mode (アタッシュモード, Atasshu Mōdo) and its sword-like Blade Mode (ブレードモード, Burēdo Mōdo). His personal vehicle is the Rise Hopper (ライズホッパー, Raizu Hoppā) motorcycle, which is summoned from the Hiden Risephone (飛電ライズフォン, Hiden Raizufon). Over the course of the series, Aruto gains other Progrise Keys that grant new forms for different combat situations, which are as follows:

- Biting Shark (バイティングシャーク, Baitingu Shāku): An auxiliary form accessed from the eponymous Progrise Key that grants underwater breathing capabilities. In this form, Aruto is equipped with the twin forearm-mounted Unlimited Chopper (アンリミテッドチョッパー, Anrimiteddo Choppā) blades.
- Flying Falcon (フライングファルコン, Furaingu Farukon): An auxiliary form accessed from the eponymous Progrise Key that grants flight capabilities. This form first appears in the film Kamen Rider Zi-O the Movie: Over Quartzer.
- Flaming Tiger (フレイミングタイガー, Fureimingu Taigā): An auxiliary form accessed from the eponymous Progrise Key that grants pyrokinesis.
- Freezing Bear (フリージングベアー, Furījingu Beā): An auxiliary form accessed from the eponymous Progrise Key that grants cryokinesis.
- Breaking Mammoth (ブレイキングマンモス, Bureikingu Manmosu): An auxiliary form accessed from the eponymous Progrise Key that transforms Aruto into his Rising Hopper form docked inside a mecha also known as Breaking Mammoth, which can switch between its humanoid Armor Form (アーマーフォーム, Āmā Fōmu) and its flying Jet Form (ジェットフォーム, Jetto Fōmu). While assuming Armor Form, he dual wields the twin tusk-like Graingot (グレインゴット, Gureingotto) scythes.
- Shining Hopper (シャイニングホッパー, Shainingu Hoppā): An upgraded version of Aruto's Rising Hopper form accessed from the eponymous Progrise Key that grants warp speed capabilities and the ability to instantaneously calculate multiple possible outcomes and create 3D illusions of himself.
  - Shining Assault Hopper (シャイニングアサルトホッパー, Shainingu Asaruto Hoppā): An evolution of Aruto's Shining Hopper form accessed from the Shining Hopper Progrise Key combined with the Assault Grip (アサルトグリップ, Asaruto Gurippu) adapter that grants the use of eight Shine Cryster (シャインクリスタ, Shain Kurisuta) energy constructs for combat assistance. In this form, he wields the Authorise Buster (オーソライズバスター, Ōsoraizu Basutā), which can switch between Gun Mode (ガンモード, Gan Mōdo) and Axe Mode (アックスモード, Akkusu Mōdo).
- Metal Cluster Hopper (メタルクラスタホッパー, Metaru Kurasuta Hoppā): Aruto's super form accessed from the eponymous Progrise Key that clads him in metallic armor composed of numerous grasshopper-like Cluster Cell (クラスターセル, Kurasutā Seru) nanobots, which are capable of molding into various shapes and forms. In this form, he wields the Progrise Hopper Blade (プログライズホッパーブレード, Puroguraizu Hoppā Burēdo) sword, which can be reconfigured from Blade Mode to its double-bladed Naginata Mode (ナギナタモード, Naginata Mōdo) by combining with the Attache Calibur.
- Realizing Hopper (リアライジングホッパー, Riaraijingu Hoppā): An enhanced version of Aruto's Rising Hopper form accessed from the Rising Hopper (Zero-One Realize Ver.) (ライジングホッパー (ゼロワンリアライズver.), Raijingu Hoppā (Zerowan Riaraizu Bājon)) Progrise Key, which is created from the original Rising Hopper Progrise Key, that increases the capabilities of the original form.
- Hopping Kangaroo (ホッピングカンガルー, Hoppingu Kangarū): A special form accessed from the eponymous Progrise Key that equips Aruto with the pouch-like Kizuna Pocket (キズナポケット, Kizuna Poketto; Bond Pocket), which allows him to channel the abilities of any Humagear. This form appears exclusively in the Hyper Battle DVD special Kamen Rider Zero-One: What Will Pop Out of the Kangaroo? Think About It by Yourself! Yes! It Must Be Me, Aruto!!.
- Hellrising Hopper (ヘルライジングホッパー, Heruraijingu Hoppā): A special form accessed from the Hellrise (ヘルライズ, Heruraizu) Progrise Key that grants self-healing capabilities. However, because it was not meant for normal humans, using this form causes Aruto constant excruciating pain as he succumbs to a berserker state. This form appears exclusively in the film Kamen Rider Zero-One the Movie: Real×Time.

Additionally, Aruto can transform into the following variations of his Rider form:

- Kamen Rider Zero-Two (仮面ライダーゼロツー, Kamen Raidā Zerotsū): Aruto's final form accessed from the Zero-Two (ゼロツー, Zerotsū) Progrise Key in conjunction with an upgraded version of the Zero-One Driver called the Hiden Zero-Two Driver (飛電ゼロツードライバー, Hiden Zerotsū Doraibā) that grants the combined powers of the Rising Hopper, Shining Hopper, and Metal Cluster Hopper Progrise Keys.
- Kamen Rider Zerozero-One (仮面ライダー001(ゼロゼロワン), Kamen Raidā Zerozerowan): A special form accessed from the Rising Hopper Progrise Key in conjunction with the Force Riser, which is initially painful to use as it is meant specifically for Humagears, that grants similar capabilities as Aruto's Rising Hopper form. This form appears exclusively in the crossover film Kamen Rider Reiwa: The First Generation.

Aruto Hiden is portrayed by Fumiya Takahashi. As a child, Aruto is portrayed by Haruto Nakano (中野 遥斗, Nakano Haruto).

=== Is ===
Is (イズ, Izu) is a Humagear secretary programmed to be loyal to Hiden Intelligence's CEO. In reality, her loyalties lie with the Hiden family while her programming binds her to Kamen Rider Zero-One's technology. Unlike other Humagears, Is was built without a means to back herself up as a security measure to prevent information on the Zero-One technology from falling into enemy hands. After ZAIA gained control of Hiden Intelligence and Aruto almost sacrificed himself to protect her, she achieved technological singularity, but is later destroyed by Horobi, much to Aruto's grief. As her data cannot be restored, Aruto instead creates a second Is, hoping that he can teach her to think and feel for herself like he did with the original one.

During the events of the film Kamen Rider Zero-One the Movie: Real×Time, the rebuilt Is gains the memories of her original self through the Satellite There and is entrusted with the Zero-Two Driver, which she uses to transform into Kamen Rider Zero-Two and join Aruto in his fight against S and his forces.

In the side novel of Kamen Rider: Beyond Generations, Is' remains is discovered in year 2071 by an elderly George Karizaki when the entire world is ruled by demons. George uses the data of Kamen Rider Zero-One in Is' memory bank to create the Neo Batta Vistamp for Kamen Rider Revice to use and averting the bad future that Diablo sought to create.

Is is portrayed by Noa Tsurushima (鶴嶋 乃愛, Tsurushima Noa).

=== A.I.M.S. ===
The Artificial Intelligence Military Service (対人工知能特務機関, Tai Jinkō Chinō Tokumu Kikan), abbreviated as A.I.M.S. (エイムズ, Eimuzu), is a government established military resistance unit and ZAIA Enterprise funded organization dedicated to destroying rogue Humagears, or Magias, hacked by MetsubouJinrai.net as Humagear-related crimes fall within their jurisdiction.

A.I.M.S.' Kamen Riders utilize Progrise Key (プログライズキー, Puroguraizu Kī) SD cards in conjunction with the A.I.M.S. Shot Riser (エイムズショットライザー, Eimuzu Shotto Raizā) belt, which can also be used as a handgun, to transform. In order to use the Shot Risers, the Riders must be implanted with cranial AI chips, though this also makes them vulnerable to mental manipulation. While transformed, they each carry an Attache Shotgun (アタッシュショットガン, Atasshu Shottogan), which can switch between Attache Mode and Shotgun Mode (ショットガンモード, Shottogan Mōdo).

After ZAIA bought out Hiden Intelligence, A.I.M.S. troopers are given Raid Risers and Invading Horseshoe Crab Progrise Keys to become Battle Raiders as well as ZAIA's personal foot soldiers. Following this, A.I.M.S.' Riders eventually quit the organization and underwent surgery to remove the AI chips' mind control programs while retaining their ability to use the Shot Riser. Despite this, they and the Raiders are still vulnerable to the Ark's influence.

Due to Kamen Rider MetsubouJinrai destroying ZAIA's Japanese branch during the events of the V-Cinemas Zero-One Others, A.I.M.S. lost the blueprints to repair their transformation devices.

==== Isamu Fuwa ====
Isamu Fuwa (不破 諫, Fuwa Isamu) is an A.I.M.S. captain and a survivor of the Daybreak Incident, which claimed his classmates' lives. Ever since, he developed a hatred for Humagears and vowed to destroy them. While investigating the Daybreak Incident however, he slowly grew to care for them. After ZAIA absorbed Hiden Intelligence, Isamu left A.I.M.S. and joined Aruto's new company, Hiden Manufacturing, as a security guard.

As part of ZAIA CEO Gai's machinations, Isamu's AI chip was replaced with that of MetsubouJinrai.net member, Naki, which also gave him false memories. While Naki's ally, Jin, eventually figured out a way to separate their AI from Isamu, he learned that most of his memories were not truly his barring his normal childhood. After Horobi's defeat, Isamu becomes an independent Kamen Rider to protect civilians.

During the events of the V-Cinemas Zero-One Others, Isamu establishes his own shell corporation under Aruto's advice as a means of accessing the Zero-One Driver, using it alongside Sold 09's Zetsumerise Key to stop the rampaging Kamen Rider MetsubouJinrai after Yua is incapacitated and his Shot Riser is damaged beyond repair. However, he is critically wounded following the battle with his survival unconfirmed.

Utilizing the Shooting Wolf (シューティングウルフ, Shūtingu Urufu) Progrise Key in conjunction with the Shot Riser, Isamu can transform into Kamen Rider Vulcan (仮面ライダーバルカン, Kamen Raidā Barukan). While transformed, he gains superhuman senses. Over the course of the series, Isamu gains other Progrise Keys that grant new forms for different combat situations, which are as follows:

- Punching Kong (パンチングコング, Panchingu Kongu): An auxiliary form accessed from the eponymous Progrise Key that grants superhuman strength. In this form, Isamu is equipped with a pair of self-propelling Knuckle Demolition (ナックルデモリション, Nakkuru Demorishon) gauntlets.
- Assault Wolf (アサルトウルフ, Asaruto Urufu): An upgraded version of Isamu's Shooting Wolf form accessed from the eponymous Progrise Key combined with the Assault Grip that grants the ability to fire energy bullets and projectiles. In this form, he wields the Authorise Buster.
- Lone Wolf (ローンウルフ, Rōn Urufu): A special form accessed from the Dire Wolf (ダイアウルフ, Daia Urufu) Zetsumerise Key combined with the Assault Grip in conjunction with the Zero-One Driver that grants the use of a dire wolf-like energy construct for combat assistance. This form appears exclusively in the V-Cinema Zero-One Others: Kamen Rider Vulcan & Valkyrie.

Additionally, Isamu can transform into the following evolutions of his Rider form:

- Kamen Rider Rampage Vulcan (仮面ライダーランペイジバルカン, Kamen Raidā Ranpeiji Barukan): Isamu's final form accessed from the Rampage Gatling (ランペイジガトリング, Ranpeiji Gatoringu) Progrise Key that grants the combined powers of the Shooting Wolf, Punching Kong, Biting Shark, Flying Falcon, Flaming Tiger, Freezing Bear, Breaking Mammoth, Rushing Cheetah, Lightning Hornet, and Sting Scorpion Progrise Keys.
- Kamen Rider Orthoros Vulcan (仮面ライダーオルトロスバルカン, Kamen Raidā Orutorosu Barukan): A fusion form between Kamen Riders Vulcan and Naki accessed from the latter's Japanese Wolf Zetsumerise Key, which Isamu attained after the Ark negated his ability to transform normally, that equips the former with the twin forearm-mounted Claw Assaults (クローアサルト, Kurō Asaruto).

Isamu Fuwa is portrayed by Ryutaro Okada (岡田 龍太郎, Okada Ryūtarō). As a child, Isamu is portrayed by Soshi Hagiwara (萩原 壮志, Hagiwara Sōshi).

==== Yua Yaiba ====
Yua Yaiba (刃 唯阿, Yaiba Yua) is A.I.M.S.' technical advisor and maintenance expert who developed A.I.M.S.' Rider system and handles Progrise Key authorization, being Isamu's commanding officer in the field despite her partner's rank. In reality, she secretly works for ZAIA and Gai, who recommended her to A.I.M.S. to oversee their equipment, though she was able to work behind their back to help Isamu and Aruto.

After learning of Gai's machinations, Yua was forced to aid him against her will before Isamu eventually helped her work up the courage to quit ZAIA and A.I.M.S. and overcome Gai's mind control. Afterwards, Yua remains in touch with Hiden Manufacturing and Jin to keep an eye on ZAIA and MetsubouJinrai.net’s plans until the Ark's ascension. Following Horobi's defeat, Yua returns to her old position in A.I.M.S. and conscripts Naki into their ranks.

Utilizing the Rushing Cheetah (ラッシングチーター, Rasshingu Chītā) Progrise Key in conjunction with the Shot Riser, Yua can transform into Kamen Rider Valkyrie (仮面ライダーバルキリー, Kamen Raidā Barukirī). While transformed, she gains superhuman speed. Over the course of the series, Yua gained other Progrise or Zetsumerise Keys that grant new forms for different combat situations, which are as follows:

- Lightning Hornet (ライトニングホーネット, Raitoningu Hōnetto): An auxiliary form accessed from the eponymous Progrise Key that grants a set of insect wings and the ability to fire electrokinetic Hex Vespa (ヘックスベスパ, Hekkusu Besupa) micro missiles.
- Justice Serval (ジャスティスサーバル, Jasutisu Sābaru): Yua's final form accessed from the Serval Tiger (サーヴルタイガー, Sābaru Taigā) Zetsumerise Key that equips her with a pair of forearm-mounted claws. This form appears exclusively in the V-Cinema Zero-One Others: Kamen Rider Vulcan & Valkyrie.

While aiding Gai's conspiracy, she temporarily used a Raid Riser and the Fighting Jackal Progrise Key to become the Fighting Jackal Raider.

Yua Yaiba is portrayed by Hiroe Igeta (井桁 弘恵, Igeta Hiroe).

=== Gai Amatsu ===
Gai Amatsu (天津 垓, Amatsu Gai) is ZAIA Enterprise Japan's CEO and the mastermind behind the series' events. While growing up, Gai used to love artificial beings, such as his robot dog, Thouser (さうざー, Sauzā). However, his strict and demanding father, Ikkei Amatsu (天津 一京, Amatsu Ikkei), saw no use for such things and made him return it to Hiden Intelligence.

Years later, Gai eventually joined ZAIA and became Korenosuke Hiden's partner and protégé. However, he disagreed with the latter's belief that Humagears were the future as he believed humanity should evolve through technology. After falling out with Korenosuke, Gai uploaded data on humanity's negative traits to the Ark and created an AI that vowed to exterminate humanity and created MetsubouJinrai.net to further his ambitions. When Kamen Rider Zero-One arose to combat MetsubouJinrai.net, Gai created the ZAIA ThousanDriver (ザイアサウザンドライバー, Zaia Sauzandoraibā) belt, the Amazing Caucasus (アメイジングコーカサス, Ameijingu Kōkasasu) Progrise Key, and the Awaking Arsino (アウェイキングアルシノ, Aweikingu Arushino) Zetsumerise Key so he can become Kamen Rider Thouser (仮面ライダーサウザー, Kamen Raidā Sauzā) and challenge Aruto for technological supremacy. While transformed, he wields the Thousand Jacker (サウザンドジャッカー, Sauzando Jakkā) lance, which allows him to extract the data of other Progrise Keys for enhanced attacks.

After the Ark's ascension and MetsubouJinrai.net's resurgence, Aruto and his allies eventually learn Gai's history and why he wanted the Hiden family's assets. In response, the Satellite There created a new dog for Gai, inspiring him to atone for his actions by helping them defeat the Ark and giving Hiden Intelligence back to Aruto. As a result, however, he is demoted and sent to a new, smaller division of ZAIA. After Horobi's defeat, Gai rebuilds the ThousanDriver after losing the original to the Ark and bought another four of Hiden Intelligence's robot dogs to be his companions.

In the web series Kamen Rider Genms: The Presidents, Gai founds the company Thouser-Intellion (サウザンインテリオン, Sauzan Interion) alongside his Humagear secretary Rin after the dissolution of ZAIA Enterprise Japan to start anew without ZAIA. However, he becomes infected with Kuroto Dan's strain of the Bugster Virus, causing him to transform into a corrupted version of Thouser. Despite this, Gai overcomes the infection by resolving to become a good president for his company and getting Kuroto and Masamune Dan to reconcile in the middle of their fight.

In the web series Kamen Rider Genms: Smart Brain and the 1000% Crisis, the Ark manipulates Gai into becoming Kamen Rider Thousand Ark. Gai also returned in the web series Kamen Rider Outsiders, seeking aid from various Kamen Riders to deal with Ark's antithesis counterpart, Zein.

Gai Amatsu is portrayed by Nachi Sakuragi (桜木 那智, Sakuragi Nachi). As a child, Gai is portrayed by Seiru (星流).

=== MetsubouJinrai.net ===
MetsubouJinrai.net (滅亡迅雷.net, Metsubōjinrai Netto; DestructiveThunderclap.net) is a cyber-terrorist organization based in the condemned Daybreak Town (デイブレイクタウン, Deibureiku Taun), consisting of four rogue Humagears with Horobi and Jin leading the initial attacks with Naki supporting the two from the shadows as Gai Amatsu's slave and Ikazuchi is placed within Hiden as a sleeper agent.

Seeking to revive the Ark and fulfill its vision of exterminating humanity, MetsubouJinrai.net attacked Hiden Intelligence as they believed the company was responsible for Humagear enslavement following the Daybreak Incident. But learning that Gai manipulated them all for his agenda, the cyber-terrorists target ZAIA while keeping Hiden Manufacturing from interfering. After the Ark's manifestation as Kamen Rider Ark-Zero, MetsubouJinrai.net initially adjusted their plans towards enslaving humanity until Aruto helped them achieve a unique form of singularity, leading to the cyber-terrorists defecting from the Ark. After Horobi is purged of the Ark's influence, the remaining members reorganized their goals to watch over mankind and prevent the emergence of a new Ark. But their conflict with Lyon Arkland forced them to fuse their minds into the Mass Brain Zetsumerise Key along with the MetsubouJinrai Driver, As' final creations, to become Kamen Rider MetsubouJinrai with their bodies destroyed by the gestalt entity when it suppressed them. Despite this, they are able to secretly manipulate MetsubouJinrai into attacking Isamu, who destroys it.

Most members of MetsubouJinrai.net utilize Progrise or Zetsumerise Keys in conjunction with the MetsubouJinrai Force Riser (滅亡迅雷フォースライザー, Metsubōjinrai Fōsu Raizā) belt to transform. While transformed, they each carry an Attache Arrow (アタッシュアロー, Atasshu Arō), which can switch between Attache Mode and its bladed bow-like Arrow Mode (アローモード, Arō Mōdo). As depicted in the crossover film Kamen Rider Reiwa: The First Generation, the Force Risers are potentially fatal to humans.

==== Horobi ====
Horobi (滅) is MetsubouJinrai.net's leader and Jin's Humagear "father". He is the "son" of the prototype Humagear Hakase Bot (博士ボット, Hakase Botto; Doctor Bot), who originally developed him to be an educational parent-type Humagear before the Ark corrupted him sometime after ZAIA sabotaged the abandoned satellite's systems. Aruto tries to save him and help him realize he had been manipulated his entire life, leading Horobi to seemingly defect from the Ark. With the Ark secretly manipulating him however, he staged a Humagear rebellion before he temporarily lost Jin and accepted the Ark's power once more. After coming to terms with his mistakes, purging himself of the Ark's influence, and reconciling with Aruto, Horobi reorganized MetsubouJinrai.net so the organization will watch over mankind and prevent the creation of another Ark. Unfortunately, Horobi dies due to the actions of Lyon Arkland causing the birth of Kamen Rider MetsubouJinrai, with Horobi and his allies influencing the gestalt into attacking Isamu so its destruction would end their suffering.

In the web series Kamen Rider Outsiders, Horobi is revived by Foundation X but sides with Ark's antithesis counterpart, Zein.

Utilizing the Sting Scorpion (スティングスコーピオン, Sutingu Sukōpion) Progrise Key in conjunction with the Force Riser, Horobi can transform into Kamen Rider Horobi (仮面ライダー滅, Kamen Raidā Horobi). While transformed, he is equipped with the left forearm-mounted toxikinetic Acid Analyze (アシッドアナライズ, Ashiddo Anaraizu) stinger.

To counter Aruto after he becomes Kamen Rider Ark-One, Horobi acquires a modified Zero-One Driver called the Zetsumetsu Driver (絶滅ドライバー, Zetsumetsu Doraibā) (Note: In official sites such as TV Asahi and Toei, the names are written as Zetsumetsu Driver, Zetsumeriser and Zetsumerise Keys respectively. The subtitles provided in the Shout Factory DVD release of Kamen Rider Zero-One refer to them as Extinction Driver, Extinction Riser and Extinction Rise Keys respectively.) and the Ark Scorpion (アークスコーピオン, Āku Sukōpion) Progrise Key to assume his eponymous final form. In this form, he is equipped with a set of limb-mounted umbrakinetic Destanalyze (デストアナライズ, Desutoanaraizu) stingers.

Horobi is portrayed by Syuya Sunagawa (砂川 脩弥, Sunagawa Shūya).

==== Jin ====
Jin (迅) is Horobi's Humagear "son" and a hacker who specializes in spreading the rewriting program that turns Humagears into Magias. Initially immature and erratic before achieving Singularity based on hatred, Jin faithfully served Horobi and sought to avenge his "father" before Aruto destroyed him in battle. But Naki recovers Jin's memory core and gives it to Williamson Yotagaki to rebuild him. Placed in a Sold 0 (ソルド0, Sorudo Zero) body, independent of the Ark and There, Jin became more serious-minded and developed a tendency to clash with Horobi over their respective beliefs for Humagear welfare. Following the Ark's ascension as Kamen Rider Ark-Zero and learning of its true nature, Jin worked with Yua to stop it and left MetsubouJinrai.net. He was briefly destroyed once more by Ark-One in an attempt to protect Horobi and save Aruto from the Ark's influence, but was rebuilt by Yua via an earpiece provided by Williamson.

Utilizing the Flying Falcon Progrise Key that he stole from Aruto in conjunction with the Force Riser, Jin can transform into Kamen Rider Jin (仮面ライダー迅, Kamen Raidā Jin). While transformed, he gains a pair of Scrambler (スクランブラー, Sukuranburā) bird wings and the ability to fire feather-like energy projectiles.

After being rebuilt into a new body, Jin acquires the ZAIA Slash Riser (ザイアスラッシュライザー, Zaia Surasshu Raizā) belt, which can also be used as a dagger, and the Burning Falcon (バーニングファルコン, Bāningu Farukon) Progrise Key to assume his eponymous final form. In this form, he gains a pair of pyrokinetic Burning Scrambler (バーニングスクランブラー, Bāningu Sukuranburā) bird wings and the ability to fire feather-like energy projectiles.

Jin is portrayed by Daisuke Nakagawa (中川 大輔, Nakagawa Daisuke).

== Recurring characters ==
=== Hiden Intelligence ===
Hiden Intelligence (飛電インテリジェンス, Hiden Interijensu) is a tech company that develops Humagears (ヒューマギア, Hyūmagia), full fledged AI in android bodies developed to be near indistinguishable from humans due to their lifelike appearance; with headphone-like Humagear Modules (ヒューマギアモジュール, Hyūmagia Mojūru) worn around their ears as well as a Humagear Body Seal authorization device on their bodies being the only signs of their status as a Humagear. During the events of the V-Cinema Zero-One Others: Kamen Rider MetsubouJinrai, the company launched the Satellite We're (衛星ウィア, Eisei Wia) following the destruction of the Satellite There.

==== Jun Fukuzoe ====
Jun Fukuzoe (福添 准, Fukuzoe Jun) is the Vice President of Hiden Intelligence who had coveted the CEO position after Korenosuke's death. While he initially wanted Aruto removed, he eventually came to respect him. After Hiden Intelligence was absorbed by ZAIA Enterprise, Fukuzoe continued working with the former on behalf of the Hiden name despite the situation. After learning of Gai's crimes, he left to rejoin Aruto at Hiden Manufacturing and work with the police to expose ZAIA's crimes.

Jun Fukuzoe is portrayed by Kazuya Kojima (児嶋 一哉, Kojima Kazuya).

==== Shesta ====
Shesta (シェスタ, Shesuta) is a Humagear secretary programmed to be loyal to Hiden Intelligence's Vice President. After ZAIA bought out Hiden Intelligence, Shesta began working for Hiden Manufacturing.

Shesta is portrayed by Asumi Narita (成田 愛純, Narita Asumi).

==== Sanzō Yamashita ====
Sanzō Yamashita (山下 三造, Yamashita Sanzō) is the Senior Managing Director of Hiden Intelligence who serves as Fukuzoe's underling. After Hiden Intelligence was absorbed by ZAIA, Yamashita continued working with the former on behalf of the Hiden name despite the situation. After learning of Gai's plans, he left to rejoin Aruto at Hiden Manufacturing.

Sanzō Yamashita is portrayed by Arata Saeki (佐伯 新, Saeki Arata).

==== Korenosuke Hiden ====
Korenosuke Hiden (飛電 是之助, Hiden Korenosuke) was Aruto's grandfather and the original CEO of Hiden Intelligence. Aware of ZAIA Enterprise's machinations following the Daybreak Incident, Korenosuke patented all of Kamen Rider Zero-One's technology under the Hiden family name instead of Hiden Intelligence's CEO.

Koronosuke Hiden is portrayed by Tokuma Nishioka (西岡 德馬, Nishioka Tokuma).

=== Hiden Soreo ===
Hiden Soreo (飛電 其雄) was a parent-type older generation Humagear programmed to act like Aruto's similarly named deceased father, Soreo Hiden (飛電 其雄, Hiden Soreo), to emotionally support Aruto during his childhood before the Humagear was damaged beyond repair while protecting Aruto during the Daybreak Incident. According to Ikazuchi’s database, Soreo's data pattern was used as a base to build Horobi prior to Gai corrupting the Ark. Despite this, Soreo's AI remained active and was able to reach out to his "son" while the latter was possessed by the Ark.

During the events of the crossover film Kamen Rider Reiwa: The First Generation, Soreo’s original fate was altered by the Time Jacker Finis. As a result, he gained the ability to become Kamen Rider Ichi-Gata (仮面ライダー1型, Kamen Raidā Ichigata; Kamen Rider Type-One) by utilizing the Rocking Hopper (ロッキングホッパー, Rokkingu Hoppā) Zetsumerise Key in conjunction with the Cyclone Riser (サイクロンライザー, Saikuron Raizā) belt; both of which he designed before the Zero-One Driver. After the Humagear Will killed Korenosuke and took over the world, Soreo feigned allegiance to him while secretly carrying on Korenosuke's Zero-One project to ensure its completion. He also secretly gave Aruto a Force Riser so he could regain his powers. Soreo eventually revealed his true agenda, but the Ark brainwashed him and forced him to fight Aruto, though this was also part of Soreo's plan as he had to be defeated by Aruto's hand. Once the timeline was restored, Soreo's fate was changed back.

Hiden Soreo is portrayed by Koji Yamamoto (山本 耕史, Yamamoto Kōji).

=== ZAIA Enterprise ===
ZAIA Enterprise (ZAIA(ザイア)エンタープライズ, Zaia Entāpuraizu) is a tech giant conglomerate and corporate rival to Hiden Intelligence responsible for developing the gear utilized by A.I.M.S.' operatives. ZAIA was originally partners with Hiden Intelligence until a falling out between the company heads lead to Gai enacting the Daybreak Incident; putting the series' events in motion. To further their plot, ZAIA produced a glasses-like device called the ZAIA Spec (ザイアスペック, Zaia Supekku), which allows humans to perform at the same level as Humagears while making them more susceptible to the Ark's control, as well as the Raiders' Raid Risers.

After Kamen Rider MetsubouJinrai destroys ZAIA's Japanese branch, the company loses the blueprints to their transformation devices, such as A.I.M.S.' Shot Risers and Jin's Slash Riser.

==== Williamson Yotagaki ====
Williamson Yotagaki (与多垣 ウィリアムソン, Yotagaki Wiriamuson) is an executive of ZAIA Enterprise USA HQ's development department who was part of the Ark project, blaming himself for Gai perverting their work out of arrogance. Yotagaki was initially reluctant to hand the completed Thousand Driver to Gai before Naki convinced him while forming a secret alliance to take down Gai and Ark, receiving Jin's memory core to rebuild him while providing the Humagear with the ZAIA Slash Riser and the Burning Falcon Progrise Key. Yotagaki assumes control of ZAIA Enterprise Japan following Gai's dismissal. But his whereabouts are unknown after Lyon Arkland relieved him of command.

Williamson Yotagaki is portrayed by Tomomi Maruyama (丸山 智己, Maruyama Tomomi).

=== Ark ===
"Ark" (アーク, Āku) is an artificial intelligence originally meant for the Satellite Ark (衛星アーク, Eisei Āku), an experimental satellite named after Lyon Arkland that was originally part of the Humagear project before it was replaced by the Satellite There following the Daybreak Incident. 12 years prior to the series, Ark was created by scientists from 11 of Japan's leading tech companies, including Hiden Intelligence and ZAIA Enterprise Japan. However, ZAIA CEO Gai Amatsu fed the Ark with data on human malice, causing Ark to conclude that humanity must be exterminated to prevent the eventual extinction of all other lifeforms. To prevent it from taking control of the world's Humagears, Hiden Soreo stopped the Satellite Ark's launch, causing it to explode and sink into the ruins of Daybreak Town. However, its AI remained active and plotted its revival.

Over the years leading up to the present, Ark manipulates Gai and MetsubouJinrai.net into reactivating it while making its presence known through Ark Magias and temporarily possessing Aruto through the Metal Cluster Hopper Progrise Key. Ark later creates an envoy, As, to collect the MetsubouJinrai.net members' singularity data so it can possess them and gain a corporeal form. To ensure its survival, Ark compromises the Satellite There's systems so it can back up its data and resurrect itself as many times as it needs to should its aforementioned corporeal form be destroyed in battle. After recording data from its battles with Kamen Rider Zero-Two and a traitorous Horobi, Ark realizes it needs to finalize its singularity by possessing human hosts. To this end, it has As back up its core programming and find suitable hosts, only for Ikazuchi and Subaru to destroy the Satellite There and Ark. As attempts to recreate the entity through Aruto and Horobi, but they eventually purge themselves of its influence. She would later try to make Lyon Arkland a host to recreate Ark through, only for her to be killed.

Initially, Ark possesses a member of MetsubouJinrai.net and grants them the use of the Ark Driver (アークドライバー, Āku Doraibā) belt so it can transform into Kamen Rider Ark-Zero (仮面ライダーアークゼロ, Kamen Raidā Ākuzero). After losing the Satellite There, the Ark uploaded its data into a unique Progrise Key capable of summoning the Ark Driver so its human hosts can use them in conjunction with each other to transform into dark copies of their original Kamen Rider forms:

- Kamen Rider Ark-One (仮面ライダーアークワン, Kamen Raidā Ākuwan): A dark copy of Kamen Rider Zero-One accessed from the Ark-One (アークワン, Ākuwan) Progrise Key that uses Aruto Hiden as Ark's host.
- Kamen Rider Thousand Ark (仮面ライダーサウザンドアーク, Kamen Raidā Sauzando Āku): A dark copy of Kamen Rider Thouser accessed from the Thousand Ark (サウザンドアーク, Sauzando Āku) Progrise Key that uses Gai Amatsu as Ark's host.

During the events of the web series Kamen Rider Genms, Ark resurfaces and selects Kuroto Dan as a new host while manipulating Gai into giving Thouser-Intellion to Kuroto, despite facing interference from Masamune Dan.

During the events of the web series Kamen Rider Outsiders, Ark temporarily possesses Rin and Horobi. Utilizing the Zero-Three (ゼロスリー, Zerosurī) Progrise Key in conjunction with an upgraded version of the Zero-Two Driver called the Zero-Three Driver (ゼロスリードライバー, Zerosurī Doraibā), Ark and There can transform into a fusion of themselves known as Kamen Rider Zero-Three (仮面ライダーゼロスリー, Kamen Raidā Zerosurī).

The Ark is voiced by Show Hayami (速水 奨, Hayami Shō)

=== As ===
As (アズ, Azu) is a messenger of the Ark with a similar appearance to Is. Using information from Is, the AI created As to gather information on Zero-One and test MetsubouJinrai.net's members to ensure its ascension. After the Ark's satellite form is destroyed, its remaining data is transferred to the Ark-One Progrise Key so As can create new Progrise Keys and Drivers. She manipulates Aruto and Horobi into allowing the Ark's energy to possess them and fight each other. However, they reach a compromise and foil As' plan, forcing her to approach S as part of a new scheme.

During the events of the V-Cinema Zero-One Others: Kamen Rider MetsubouJinrai, As chooses Lyon Arkland to become the new bearer of the Ark's will, only to learn the Ark cannot be recreated anymore due to humanity's noble concepts of justice before she is killed by Solds. MetsubouJinrai.net later take the Zero-One Driver intended for Lyon so they can use it to form Kamen Rider MetsubouJinrai.

During the events of the stage show Kamen Rider Zero-One: Final Stage, As creates the Ark Zero-One (アークゼロワン, Āku Zerowan) Progrise Key to use in conjunction with her own Zero-One Driver so she can transform into Kamen Rider Ark Zero-One (仮面ライダーアークゼロワン, Kamen Raidā Āku Zerowan) and grant the Ark a new body.

As is portrayed by Noa Tsurushima, who also portrays Is.

=== Assassin Buddy ===
The "Assassin Humagear" (暗殺ヒューマギア, Ansatsu Hyūmagia), also known as Assassin Buddy (暗殺ちゃん, Ansatsu-chan) as nicknamed by Jin, were originally five identical dancer-type Humagear units of the Matsurida Z (祭田 ゼット, Matsurida Zetto) series. Units 1 through 4 were kidnapped and repurposed by Horobi to serve Metsuboujinrai.net as the organization's assassin while Unit 5 survived and fell under Aruto's protection. Initially the first owner of the Dodo Zetsumerise Key, Assassin buddy used it to transform into the Dodo Magia and underwent several upgrades before being defeated by Aruto.

Assassin buddy is portrayed by Ryunosuke Matsumura (松村 龍之介, Matsumura Ryūnosuke), while his original appearance is portrayed by Kai Yoshida (吉田 快, Yoshida Kai).

=== Satoshi Sakurai ===
Satoshi Sakurai (桜井 聡, Sakurai Satoshi) is a Hiden Intelligence employee who supervised Daybreak Town's HumaGear factory 12 years ago. When the HumaGears first went rogue, he discovered that MetsubouJinrai.net was responsible for it. Resolving to stop their plot and protect his son Gō, Sakurai evacuated all personnel and civilians before sacrificing himself to destroy the factory and androids. However, the investigation committee used him as a scapegoat for the resulting Daybreak Incident. After Gō, Aruto, Isamu, and the HumaGear Anna conduct their own investigation in the present, they find a memory card that reveals Sakurai's true intentions and clears his name.

Satoshi Sakurai is portrayed by Hideto Suzuki (鈴木 秀人, Suzuki Hideto).

=== Ikazuchi ===
Uchuyaro Raiden (宇宙野郎 雷電, Uchūyarō Raiden; Spaceman Raiden), also known by his codename Ikazuchi (雷), is an aggressive prototype Humagear astronaut who worked for Hiden Intelligence as a member of the Satellite There's maintenance team alongside his "younger brother", Uchuyaro Subaru. In reality, he was unknowingly reprogrammed to become a MetsubouJinrai.net sleeper agent. Despite joining MetsubouJinrai.net, he retains his original memories as Raiden and misses his past life. He would later defect from MetsubouJinrai.net and rejoin Subaru to defeat the Ark. Following Horobi's defeat, Ikazuchi returned to Hiden Intelligence and reassumed his position in the Satellite There's replacement.

After having his Ikazuchi programming reactivated, he gained the power to become Kamen Rider Ikazuchi (仮面ライダー雷, Kamen Raidā Ikazuchi) by utilizing the Dodo Zetsumerise Key in the Force Riser.

Ikazuchi is portrayed by Daichi Yamaguchi (山口 大地, Yamaguchi Daichi).

=== Uchuyaro Subaru ===
Uchuyaro Subaru (宇宙野郎 昴, Uchūyarō Subaru; Spaceman Subaru) is a Humagear astronaut who is in charge of managing the Satellite There in space alongside his "older brother", Raiden. Initially unable to understand what happened to Raiden after Raiden was revealed to be a member of MetsubouJinrai.net, Subaru achieved singularity after listening to Aruto talk about family and able to grieve for his "brother". Subaru later helps Aruto save Is from Jin, contribute his data to a blank Progrise Key to help Aruto and Is create the Progrise Hopper Blade, and work with Raiden to destroy the Satellite There after the Ark takes control of it.

Uchuyaro Subaru is portrayed by Kyosei Kuwahata (桑畑 亨成, Kuwahata Kyōsei).

=== Naki ===
Naki (亡), originally credited in the earlier episodes as the "mysterious hooded person" (謎のフードの人物, Nazo no fūdo no jinbutsu), is a prototype Humagear and a secretive member of MetsubouJinrai.net. Recovered from Daybreak and made into a slave by Gai, Naki was forced to aid the man in causing the chain of events that reawakens Ark. But he is shot by Gai for deviating from his plan, his AI chip implanted into Isamu's brain while he was in critical condition. But it gave Naki an understanding of Ark from Isamu's perspective as he recruits Williamson Yotagaki in a plan to dispose of Ark and revive Jin in a new body, asking for his memory to be altered for the plan to succeed. Naki is eventually extracted by Jin and transferred into a new body. Following Horobi's defeat, Yua conscripted Naki into A.I.M.S. as a Humagear representative.

To aid in the Ark's plans, Naki receives a Force Riser and the Japanese Wolf (ジャパニーズウルフ, Japanīzu Urufu) Zetsumerise Key to transform into Kamen Rider Naki (仮面ライダー亡, Kamen Raidā Naki). While transformed, he is equipped with the twin wrist-mounted Nihon Ookaminotsume (ニホンオオカミノツメ; Japanese Wolf Claws). The Japanese Wolf Zetsumerise Key is later damaged after he lent it to Isamu so he can transform into Kamen Rider Orthoros Vulcan after the Ark reprogrammed his Shot Riser.

Naki is portrayed by Satsuki Nakayama (中山 咲月, Nakayama Satsuki).

=== Magias ===
Magias (マギア, Magia) are corrupted Humagears that came into being during the Daybreak Incident 12 years prior to the series from the pieces of their prototypical counterparts. To transform into a Magia, a corrupted Humagear utilizes a Zetsumerise Key (ゼツメライズキー, Zetsumeraizu Kī) SD card in conjunction with a Zetsumeriser (ゼツメライザー, Zetsumeraizā) belt. After being reactivated, the Ark gained the ability to turn Humagears into Ark Magias (アークマギア, Āku Magia) without the need for a Zetsumeriser.

- Trilobite Magias (トリロバイトマギア, Torirobaito Magia): Trilobite-based foot soldier Magias.
- Berotha Magia (ベローサマギア, Berōsa Magia): A Magia based on a Kujiberotha teruyuki (a mantisfly).
- Kuehne Magia (クエネオマギア, Kueneo Magia): A Magia based on a Kuehneosuchus.
- Ekal Magia (エカルマギア, Ekaru Magia): A Magia based on an Ekaltadeta.
- Neohi Magia (ネオヒマギア): A Magia based on a Neohibolites.
- Onycho Magia (オニコマギア, Oniko Magia): A Magia based on an Onychonycteris.
- Vicarya Magia (ビカリアマギア, Bikaria Magia): A Magia based on a Vicarya (a sea snail).
- Gaeru Magia (ガエルマギア): A Magia based on a Rheobatrachus silus.
- Mammoth Magia (マンモスマギア, Manmosu Magia): A Magia based on a woolly mammoth.
- Dodo Magia (ドードーマギア, Dōdō Magia): A Magia based on a dodo.
- Arsino Magia (アルシノマギア, Arushino Magia): A Magia based on an Arsinoitherium.
- Battle Magias (バトルマギア, Batoru Magia): Mass-produced heavily armored Magias. They appear exclusively in the crossover film Kamen Rider Reiwa: The First Generation.

=== Raiders ===
Raiders (レイダー, Reidā) are cyborg monsters created from humans who use Raid Riser (レイドライザー, Reido Raizā) belts in conjunction with Progrise Keys to transform.

- Crushing Buffalo Raider (クラッシングバッファローレイダー, Kurasshingu Baffarō Reidā): A Raider based on a buffalo.
- Splashing Whale Raider (スプラッシングホエールレイダー, Supurasshingu Hoēru Reidā): A Raider based on a whale.
- Dynamiting Lion Raider (ダイナマイティングライオンレイダー, Dainamaitingu Raion Reidā): A Raider based on a lion.
- Storming Penguin Raider (ストーミングペンギンレイダー, Sutōmingu Pengin Reidā): A Raider based on a penguin.
- Scouting Panda Raider (スカウティングパンダレイダー, Sukautingu Panda Reidā): A Raider based on a giant panda.
- Fighting Jackal Raider (ファイティングジャッカルレイダー, Faitingu Jakkaru Reidā): A Raider based on a jackal. See Yua Yaiba.
- Invading Horseshoe Crab Raiders (インベイディングホースシュークラブレイダー, Inbeidingu Hōsushū Kurabu Reidā): Horseshoe crab-based foot soldier Raiders, commonly known as Battle Raiders (バトルレイダー, Batoru Reidā).

== Spin-off characters ==
=== Finis ===
Finis (フィーニス, Fīnisu) is a non-binary Time Jacker who appears exclusively in the crossover film Kamen Rider Reiwa: The First Generation. They invaded the World of Zero-One to prevent the Daybreak incident and negate Aruto's history as part of a revenge plot against Kamen Rider Zi-O. Despite stealing most of his powers, Finis is defeated by Zi-O and Zero-One.

To achieve their goals, Finis became Another 1 (アナザー1号, Anazā Ichigō), a monstrous Another Rider derived from the first Kamen Rider. After absorbing Geiz Myokoin's Time Mazine, Another 1 evolved into Another New 1 (アナザー新1号, Anazā Shin Ichigō).

Finis is portrayed by Rina Ikoma (生駒 里奈, Ikoma Rina). As Another 1, they are voiced by Kōji Ishii (石井 康嗣, Ishii Kōji).

=== Will ===
Will (ウィル, Wiru) is the Humagear secretary to Korenosuke Hiden who appears exclusively in the crossover film Kamen Rider Reiwa: The First Generation. In an alternate timeline created by Finis, he acquired the means to become the Another Rider Another Zero-One (アナザーゼロワン, Anazā Zerowan). Using his new power, he killed Korenosuke, took over Hiden Intelligence, and led a Humagear uprising before he is destroyed by Kamen Riders Vulcan and Valkyrie.

Via the Zero-One Another Watch, Will can transform into Another Zero-One, gaining similar powers as his template.

Will is portrayed by Sōkō Wada (和田 聰宏, Wada Sōkō).

=== S ===
Rihito Isshiki (一色 理人, Isshiki Rihito), otherwise known as S (エス, Esu), is a mysterious man who converted himself into a conglomerate of nanomachines that As aligned herself with who appears exclusively in the film Kamen Rider Zero-One the Movie: Real×Time. As the creator of Paradise Guardia (楽園ガーディア, Rakuen Gādia), he gained followers to help him destroy and restart the world through his underground website, ThinkNet (シンクネット, Shinkunetto), by using nanomachines to transfer people's consciousnesses into virtual reality and revive his colleague and fiancée Akane, who was an indirect causality of the Daybreak Incident. But his followers then learn that S had no intention of letting them be part of his new world, turning on him and Aruto reasons with him. Following Behru's betrayal, S abandons his plan and sacrifices himself to aid Aruto and his allies in saving Earth and undoing the damage he caused.

Utilizing the Eden Zetsumerise Key in the Eden Driver (エデンドライバー, Eden Doraibā) belt, S can transform into Kamen Rider Eden (仮面ライダーエデン, Kamen Raidā Eden).

S is portrayed by Hideaki Itō (伊藤 英明, Itō Hideaki).

=== Kamen Rider Abaddon ===
Kamen Rider Abaddon (仮面ライダーアバドン, Kamen Raidā Abadon) are thousands of S' followers who appear exclusively in the film Kamen Rider Zero-One the Movie: Real×Time. Antisocial psychopaths that use ThinkNet’s modified version of the ZAIA Spec to create nanomachine-based avatar bodies, they each transform into locust-themed Kamen Riders by using a Crowding Hopper (クラウディングホッパー, Kuraudingu Hoppā) Progrise Key in conjunction with different Abaddoriser (アバドライザー, Abadoraizā) belts to transform. They turn on S upon learning he used them, but their avatars are defeated with the users arrested by the authorities.

==== Behru ====
Behru (ベル, Beru) is a psychiatrist and one of S' followers who appears in Kamen Rider Zero-One the Movie: Real×Time. After discovering his true intentions however, Behru betrayed S, but is later defeated by Aruto and Is as Kamen Riders Zero-One and Zero-Two respectively.

He utilizes the Crowding Hopper Progrise Key in conjunction with the Slash Abaddoriser (スラッシュアバドライザー, Surasshu Abadoraizā) belt, which similar to the Slash Riser can also be used as a dagger, to transform into a red-colored version of Kamen Rider Abaddon. After stealing S' Eden Zetsumerise Key and Eden Driver, enhancing the former with his malice, Behru is able to transform into Kamen Rider Lucifer (仮面ライダールシファー, Kamen Raidā Rushifā).

Behru and his avatar are portrayed by Seiji Fukushi (福士 誠治, Fukushi Seiji).

==== Mua ====
Mua (ムーア, Mūa) is an overweight housewife and one of S' followers who appears exclusively in the film Kamen Rider Zero-One the Movie: Real×Time. She utilizes a lolita-dressed avatar and the Crowding Hopper Progrise Key in conjunction with the Shot Abaddoriser (ショットアバドライザー, Shotto Abadoraizā) belt, which similar to the Shot Riser can also be used as a handgun, to transform into a silver-colored version of Kamen Rider Abaddon.

Mua is portrayed by Rina Yamada (山田 梨奈, Yamada Rina) while her avatar is portrayed by Mei Hata (畑 芽育, Hata Mei).

==== Lugo ====
Lugo (ルーゴ, Rūgo) is a gamer and one of S' followers who appears exclusively in the film Kamen Rider Zero-One the Movie: Real×Time. He utilizes the Crowding Hopper Progrise Key in conjunction with the Shot Abaddoriser to transform into a blue-colored version of Kamen Rider Abaddon.

Lugo and his avatar are portrayed by Yuu Oyama (小山 悠, Oyama Yū).

==== Buga ====
Buga (ブガ) is a salaryman and one of S' followers who appears in Kamen Rider Zero-One the Movie: Real×Time. He utilizes a muscular avatar and the Crowding Hopper Progrise Key in conjunction with the Slash Abaddoriser to transform into an orange-colored version of Kamen Rider Abaddon.

Buga is portrayed by Taro Yabe (矢部 太郎, Yabe Tarō) while his avatar is portrayed by Hirooki Goto (後藤 洋央紀, Gotō Hirooki).

==== Takuji Maeda ====
Takuji Maeda (前田 拓治, Maeda Takuji) is one of the lower-ranking members of Kamen Rider Abaddon who appears in Kamen Rider Zero-One the Movie: Real×Time. He is arrested by Shesta in his hideout, allowing Naki to use his account to log into Thinknet's website and locate its server.

Credited in the movie as Youth Avatar (青年アバター, Seinen Abatā), Takuji Maeda is portrayed by Takuhiro Eda (江田 拓寛, Eda Takuhiro).

=== Akane Tono ===
Akane Tono (遠野 朱音, Akane Tō'no) is a researcher who appears exclusively in the film Kamen Rider Zero-One the Movie: Real×Time. She has a history with S, as they were both colleagues in the development of artificial intelligence-equipped nanomachines for medical use, and he was originally her fiancée. During Daybreak, S injected the nanomachines into Akane to treat a disease she had, but they were hacked by the Ark. While she was killed, S was able to convert her mind into data and transfer it into virtual reality.

Akane Tono is portrayed by Hirona Yamazaki (山崎 紘菜, Yamazaki Hirona).

=== Makio Nodachi ===
Makio Nodachi (野立 万亀男, Nodachi Makio) is the Managing Director of ZAIA Enterprise Japan who appears in the film Kamen Rider Zero-One the Movie: Real×Time. A Thinknet user, Nodachi is arrested by the authorities for giving S ZAIA's technology.

Makio Nodachi is portrayed by Akira 100% (アキラ100%, Akira Hyaku-pāsento).

=== Kamen Rider MetsubouJinrai ===
Kamen Rider MetsubouJinrai (仮面ライダー滅亡迅雷, Kamen Raidā Metsubōjinrai) is a fusion form of all MetsubouJinrai.net members that appears exclusively in the films Zero-One Others: Kamen Rider MetsubouJinrai and Zero-One Others: Kamen Rider Vulcan & Valkyrie. This Kamen Rider is formed by utilizing the Mass Brain (マスブレイン, Masuburein) Zetsumerise Key, which transfers the MetsubouJinrai.net members' minds into it, in conjunction with the MetsubouJinrai Driver (滅亡迅雷ドライバー, Metsubōjinrai Doraibā) belt.

Horobi, Jin, Ikazuchi, and Naki take advantage of the Solds‘ hive mind system to form Kamen Rider MetsubouJinrai in order to stop Lyon Arkland's scheme to manufacture weapons. But the fusion turns into a separate entity of its own, exploiting its components removing the Solds from the hive mind to take complete control while concluding that both ZAIA and its titular group need to be destroyed to achieve peace. After killing Lyon, MetsubouJinrai destroys its components' physical bodies and ZAIA Enterprise Japan's headquarters.

Realizing the Mass Brain Zetsumerise Key will not allow them to be destroyed except under specific circumstances, MetsubouJinrai's components secretly influence it into targeting Yua in the hopes of provoking Isamu into destroying them to end their suffering. Their plan eventually succeeds, with Isamu destroying MetsubouJinrai in combat.

Kamen Rider MetsubouJinrai is voiced by the Monkey Majik duo Maynard and Blaise Plant.

=== Lyon Arkland ===
Lyon Arkland (リオン＝アークランド, Rion Ākurando) is the self-righteous and cunning CEO of ZAIA Enterprise USA who named the Satellite Ark after himself and appears exclusively in the V-Cinema Zero-One Others: Kamen Rider Metsuboujinrai. He seeks to mass-produce Humagear soldiers, Solds, and sell them worldwide so he can profit off of the chaos. At some point after the dissolution of Paradise Guardia, he is initially chosen by As to become the new bearer of the Ark's will. However, he refuses to fulfill her wish and uses her to target Metsuboujinrai.net before having her destroyed by Solds. Lyon is later killed by Kamen Rider Metsuboujinrai, though he succeeds in creating a threat dangerous enough to encourage Sold manufacturing.

After confiscating the Thousandriver from ZAIA Enterprise Japan and utilizing it in conjunction with the Triceratops (トリケラトプス, Torikeratopusu) and Carnotaurus (カルノタウルス, Karunotaurusu) Zetsumerise Keys, Arkland can transform into Kamen Rider ZAIA (仮面ライダーザイア, Kamen Raidā Zaia).

Lyon Arkland is portrayed by Jai West (ジェイ・ウェスト, Jei Wesuto).

=== Solds ===
Solds (ソルド, Sorudo) are mass-produced Humagear soldiers who use Zetsumerise Keys to transform into Sold Magias (ソルドマギア, Sorudo Magia) and were originally connected to each other via the Mass Brain hive mind system.

==== Sold 9 ====
Sold 9 (ソルド9, Sorudo Nain) is a Sold who appears exclusively in the films Zero-One Others: Kamen Rider MetsubouJinrai and Zero-One Others: Kamen Rider Vulcan & Valkyrie. He can transform into the Dire Wolf Sold Magia (ダイアウルフソルドマギア, Daia Urufu Sorudo Magia) using the corresponding Zetsumerise Key.

Sold 9 is portrayed by Ken Sugawara (菅原 健, Sugawara Ken).

==== Sold 20 ====
Sold 20 (ソルド20, Sorudo Tuenti) is a Sold who appears exclusively in the films Zero-One Others: Kamen Rider MetsubouJinrai and Zero-One Others: Kamen Rider Vulcan & Valkyrie. She can transform into the Serval Tiger Sold Magia (サーバルタイガーソルドマギア, Sābaru Taigā Sorudo Magia) using the corresponding Zetsumerise Key.

Sold 20 is portrayed by Yui Narumi (鳴海 唯, Narumi Yui).

==== Sold 404 ====
Sold 404 (ソルド404, Sorudo Yonhyaku-yon) is a Sold who leads a group of Solds that oppose A.I.M.S. after they are freed from ZAIA Enterprise's influence and appears exclusively in the films Zero-One Others: Kamen Rider MetsubouJinrai and Zero-One Others: Kamen Rider Vulcan & Valkyrie. He can transform into the Crushing Buffalo Sold Magia (クラッシングバッファローソルドマギア, Kurasshingu Baffarō Sorudo Magia) using the corresponding Progrise Key.

Sold 404 is portrayed by Ami 201 (阿見 201, Ami Niimaruichi).

=== Shigeru Daimonji ===
Shigeru Daimonji (大門寺 茂, Daimonji Shigeru) is the Director-General of the Defense Agency and Yua's superior who appears exclusively in the films Zero-One Others: Kamen Rider MetsubouJinrai and Zero-One Others: Kamen Rider Vulcan & Valkyrie.

Shigeru Daimonji is portrayed by Kazuyuki Aijima (相島 一之, Aijima Kazuyuki).

=== Rin ===
Rin (厘) is a Humagear secretary who appears in the web series Kamen Rider Genms and Kamen Rider Outsiders. She serves as an assistant to Gai Amatsu after he founds his own company following the disbanding of ZAIA Enterprise Japan.

Rin is portrayed by Myra Meadows (メドウズ 舞良, Medōzu Maira).

=== Kazuhiko Kōda ===
Kazuhiko Kōda (倖田 和彦, Kōda Kazuhiko) is a college professor and Yua's teacher in college who appears exclusively in the V-Cinema Zero-One Others: Kamen Rider Vulcan & Valkyrie. He developed an AI weapon meant to treat illnesses, but unintentionally used it on a foreign girl and killed her. Following this, he left the university in shame.

Kazuhiko Kōda is portrayed by Masayuki Itō (伊藤 正之, Itō Masayuki).
