= Kamen Rider Zero-One the Movie: Real×Time =

Japanese superhero film

Kamen Rider Zero-One the Movie: REAL×TIME

Japanese name
- Kanji: 劇場版 仮面ライダーゼロワン REAL×TIME
Transcriptions
- Revised Hepburn: Gekijōban Kamen Raidā Zero Wan Riaru Taimu
- Directed by: Teruaki Sugihara
- Written by: Yuya Takahashi
- Starring: Fumiya Takahashi; Ryutaro Okada; Noa Tsurushima; Hiroe Igeta; Daisuke Nakagawa; Syuya Sunagawa; Nachi Sakuragi; Daichi Yamaguchi; Satsuki Nakayama; Asumi Narita; Arata Saeki; Nakayama Kinnikun; Keisuke Minami; Suzuka Ohgo; Akira 100%; Mei Hata; Yuu Oyama; Hirooki Goto; Seiji Fukushi; Hirona Yamazaki; Kazuya Kojima; Hideaki Itō
- Music by: Go Sakabe
- Production companies: Ishimori Productions; Toei TV Production Co., Ltd.
- Distributed by: Toei Company
- Release date: December 18, 2020
- Running time: 80 minutes
- Country: Japan
- Language: Japanese
- Box office: $2,611,150

Kamen Rider Zero-One the Movie: REAL×TIME (劇場版 仮面ライダーゼロワン REAL×TIME, Gekijōban Kamen Raidā Zero Wan Riaru Taimu) is a 2020 Japanese superhero film that serves as the film adaptation and epilogue for the 2019–2020 Japanese television series Kamen Rider Zero-One. It was released in Japan on December 18, 2020 in a double billing with Kamen Rider Saber Theatrical Short Story: The Phoenix Swordsman and the Book of Ruin.

== Plot ==
"If God created this world in 6 days, then I will destroy it in 60 minutes, and create a paradise." Suddenly, a mysterious cult terrorist named S / Kamen Rider Eden, causes global panic as his numerous followers, the Abaddon Riders, place people in comas with a red gas-like substance in a series of several world-scale terrorist attacks. Aruto Hiden attempts to stop S, but is defeated with S taking the Zero-Two Progrisekey for his agenda. Aruto ends up in a virtual world the victims of the Abaddon Rider attacks ended up, meeting Akane Tojo. As Isamu Fuwa, AIMS, and the reformed MetsubouJinrai.net fight off the Abaddon Riders, Gai Amatsu, detains Makio Nodachi for selling their company's tech to the enemy. Isamu meets with Aruto's humagear secretary, Is, who reveals that Aruto believed S is connected to Ark and ordered Is to tell the others and to not get involved in fear of losing her again. While Isamu and Jin are attacked by a fighter jet, the latter revealing the gas is actually nano-machines.

Everyone learns that S is be Rihito Isshiki, a specialist in AI technology who is connected to the Daybreak Incident. Horobi confronts As, who gave S the Eden Driver while adding that the man transferred his mind into his own technology. At the same time, Akane reveals to Aruto that S staged the challenge to use the ZeroTwo Progrisekey to create the Hellrise Progrisekey to destroy the world. Aruto, still connected to Zea, returns to the real while promises Akane to both stop S and give him a message from her. Reaching S with the Rise Hopper provided by Ikazuchi, Aruto battles S while Gai and his Humagear interrogators forced Makio to reveal everything he knew about ThinkNet, a dark website that S admins which is a haven for misanthropes who are using nanomachine avatar bodies via modified ZAIA Specs to enact their violent impulses as Abbadon Riders. As AIMs and Horobi locate ThinkNet to shut down the servers, helping them fill the blanks by using the Zero-Two Driver and Progrisekey, Izu's access to Zea allows her to contact the original Is. The original tells Is to save Aruto and implants her memories into her new self, becoming Kamen Rider Zero-Two to stop Aruto when he was forced to use the activated Hellrise Progrisekey away from S to prevent its use at the cost of becoming a berserk Zero-One Hellrising Hopper.

The two are relayed an image that Horobi provide of Thinknet's server connected to a Humagear with a human brain, revealed to be Akane's as Aruto learns that she died while being a test subject for Rihito's nanomachines when Ark hacked them during the Daybreak Incident with Rihito digitizing her consciousness. Aruto deduces S' paradise is meant for Akane and the victims of the Abbadon Rider attacks. Aruto relays Akane's message that she is waiting for S in the other world. A remorseful S ends up being shot by Behru, one of the top Abbadon Riders, who reached the same conclusion that he and the other disciples were disposable pawns. Behru takes the Eden Driver and becomes Kamen Rider Lucifer with every intent to destroy the world while the other top Abaddon Riders head to ThinkNet to kill Akane.

As Aruto and Is fight Behru as Kamen Riders Zero-One and Zero-Two, the other Kamen Riders hold off the Abaddon Rider as S reaches the server to meet with Akane where they marry before triggering the server room's self-destruct as Aruto and Is destroy Behru's Thousand Jacker with their Rider Kicks. The victims are restored while the Abaddon Riders are all arrested, the Kamen Riders go their separate ways.

== Cast ==
- Aruto Hiden (飛電 或人, Hiden Aruto): Fumiya Takahashi (高橋 文哉, Takahashi Fumiya)
- Isamu Fuwa (不破 諫, Fuwa Isamu): Ryutaro Okada (岡田 龍太郎, Okada Ryūtarō)
- Is (イズ, Izu), As (アズ, Azu): Noa Tsurushima (鶴嶋 乃愛, Tsurushima Noa)
- Yua Yaiba (刃 唯阿, Yaiba Yua): Hiroe Igeta (井桁 弘恵, Igeta Hiroe)
- Jin (迅): Daisuke Nakagawa (中川 大輔, Nakagawa Daisuke)
- Horobi (滅): Syuya Sunagawa (砂川 脩弥, Sunagawa Shūya)
- Gai Amatsu (天津 垓, Amatsu Gai): Nachi Sakuragi (桜木 那智, Sakuragi Nachi)
- Ikazuchi (雷): Daichi Yamaguchi (山口 大地, Yamaguchi Daichi)
- Naki (亡): Satsuki Nakayama (中山 咲月, Nakayama Satsuki)
- Shesta (シェスタ, Shesuta): Asumi Narita (成田 愛純, Narita Asumi)
- Sanzō Yamashita (山下 三造, Yamashita Sanzō): Arata Saeki (佐伯 新, Saeki Arata)
- Fukkinhoukai Taro (腹筋崩壊 太郎, Fukkinhōkai Tarō): Nakayama Kinnikun (なかやまきんに君)
- Bengoshi Bingo (弁護士ビンゴ): Keisuke Minami (南 圭介, Minami Keisuke)
- Hakui-no-Tenshi Mashiro (白衣の天使ましろちゃん, Hakui no Tenshi Mashiro-chan): Suzuka Ohgo (大後 寿々花, Ōgo Suzuka)
- Mamoru (マモル): Goro Yoshida (吉田 悟郎, Yoshida Gorō)
- Makio Nodachi (野立 万亀男, Nodachi Makio): Akira 100% (アキラ100%, Akira Hyaku-pāsento)
- Mua (ムーア, Mūa): Mei Hata (畑 芽育, Hata Mei)
- Lugo (ルーゴ, Rūgo): Yuu Oyama (小山 悠, Oyama Yū)
- Buga (ブガ): Hirooki Goto (後藤 洋央紀, Gotō Hirooki)
- Takuji Maeda (前田 拓治, Maeda Takuji; credited as "Youth avatar"): Takuhiro Eda (江田 拓寛, Eda Takuhiro)
- Mua's true identity: Rina Yamada (山田 梨奈, Yamada Rina)
- Buga's true identity: Taro Yabe (矢部 太郎, Yabe Tarō)
- Announcer Humagear: Miku Itō (伊藤 美来, Itō Miku)
- Sakaeda (栄田): Ryuma Hashido (橋渡 竜馬, Hashido Ryūma)
- Ono (尾野): Hayato Tankenaka (竹中 隼人, Takenaka Hayato)
- Old couple: Yoshiyuki Yamada (山田 良行, Yamada Yoshiyuki), Tomoko Kitano (北野 智子, Kitano Tomoko)
- Followers: Yakumo Yajima (矢島 八雲, Yajima Yakumo), Maria Takemori (竹森 まりあ, Takemori Maria)
- Behru (ベル, Beru): Seiji Fukushi (福士 誠治, Fukushi Seiji)
- Akane Tono (遠野 朱音, Akane Tō'no): Hirona Yamazaki (山崎 紘菜, Yamazaki Hirona)
- Jun Fukuzoe (福添 准, Fukuzoe Jun): Kazuya Kojima (児嶋 一哉, Kojima Kazuya)
- Es (エス, Esu): Hideaki Itō (伊藤 英明, Itō Hideaki)
- A.I. news voice: Rinna (りんな)
- News presenters (Voice): Hayato Fujii (藤井 隼, Fujii Hayato), Victor Isurugi, Jessica Gerrity, Marsita Kogure, Ryan Bryneison
- Narration: Kōichi Yamadera (山寺 宏一, Yamadera Kōichi)

== Production ==
The script was written in February 2020, and it takes place after the final episode of the television series. Originally, it depicted an incident that happened within 60 minutes during the finale, but due to being filmed during the Covid-19 state of emergency and the change in release date, it was changed to take place 3 months after the finale. The appearance of a new Is, Ark-One's early appearance being changed to As and other details were altered. Because of this, Ikazuchi and Naki which were originally not planned to appear were added to the film.

Most of S' character speeches and roles in the story were derived from the Old Testament.

The scenes in Hiden Intelligence office were shot before the series finale as the set was scheduled to be dismantled after filming was finished.

=== Suit Design ===
The movie-exclusive form for Kamen Rider Zero-One "Hellrising Hopper" was created from repainting the "Shining Assault Hopper" suit that was used in the series itself. The CGI grasshopper that appeared when the character transforms reuses the model that was created for Kamen Rider Zero-Two's transformation.

Kamen Rider Lucifer was a last-minute addition created by repainting the suit used for Kamen Rider Eden.

=== Theme song ===
- "A.I. ∴ All Imagination"
  - Lyrics: Endcape
  - Composition: J
  - Arrangement: J×Takanori Nishikawa, DJ'Tekina//Something
  - Artist: J×Takanori Nishikawa

== Reception ==
Kamen Rider Zero-One the Movie: Real×Time grossed $2,611,150 at the box office.

== Home video release ==
Shout! Factory released the film and Kamen Rider Zero-One on Blu-ray and digital on January 22, 2022 in the North America.
