= Kamen Rider Reiwa: The First Generation =

Japanese name
- Kanji: 仮面ライダー 令和 ザ・ファースト・ジェネレーション
Transcriptions
- Revised Hepburn: Kamen Raidā Reiwa Za Fāsuto Jenerēshon
- Directed by: Teruaki Sugihara
- Written by: Yuya Takahashi
- Based on: Kamen Rider Zero-One by Yuya Takahashi Kamen Rider Zi-O by Kento Shimoyama
- Starring: Fumiya Takahashi; So Okuno; Ryutaro Okada; Noa Tsurushima; Hiroe Igeta; Gaku Oshida; Shieri Ohata; Keisuke Watanabe; Daisuke Nakagawa; Syuya Sunagawa; Asumi Narita; Arata Saeki; Koji Yamamoto; Sōkō Wada; Rina Ikoma; Kazuya Kojima; Tokuma Nishioka
- Cinematography: Kōji Kurata
- Edited by: Shōkichi Kaneda
- Music by: Toshihiko Sahashi; Go Sakabe
- Production companies: Ishinomori Productions; Toei TV Production Co., Ltd.
- Distributed by: Toei Company
- Release date: December 21, 2019
- Running time: 98 minutes
- Country: Japan
- Language: Japanese
- Box office: $7,529,337

Kamen Rider Reiwa: The First Generation (仮面ライダー 令和 ザ・ファースト・ジェネレーション, Kamen Raidā Reiwa Za Fāsuto Jenerēshon) is a 2019 Japanese superhero film in the Movie War line of the Kamen Rider Series. It serves as a crossover between the television series Kamen Rider Zero-One and Kamen Rider Zi-O and is the fourth film of the Generations series. The film also pays tribute to Kamen Rider Zero-One, the original Kamen Rider series, and the entire Heisei Kamen Rider series as a whole. It also introduces Gai Amatsu as Kamen Rider Thouser.

== Cast ==
Zero-One cast

- Aruto Hiden (飛電 或人, Hiden Aruto): Fumiya Takahashi (高橋 文哉, Takahashi Fumiya)
- Isamu Fuwa (不破 諫, Fuwa Isamu): Ryutaro Okada (岡田 龍太郎, Okada Ryūtarō)
- Is (イズ, Izu): Noa Tsurushima (鶴嶋 乃愛, Tsurushima Noa)
- Yua Yaiba (刃 唯阿, Yaiba Yua): Hiroe Igeta (井桁 弘恵, Igeta Hiroe)
- Jin (迅): Daisuke Nakagawa (中川 大輔, Nakagawa Daisuke)
- Horobi (滅): Syuya Sunagawa (砂川 脩弥, Sunagawa Shūya)
- Shesta (シェスタ, Shesuta): Asumi Narita (成田 愛純, Narita Asumi)
- Sanzō Yamashita (山下 三造, Yamashita Sanzō): Arata Saeki (佐伯 新, Saeki Arata)
- Mamoru (マモル): Goro Yoshida (吉田 悟郎, Yoshida Gorō)
- Okureru (オクレル): Shogo Teramoto (寺本 翔悟, Teramoto Shōgo)
- Young Aruto: Haruto Nakano (中野 遥斗, Nakano Haruto)
- Soreo Hiden (飛電 其雄, Hiden Soreo): Koji Yamamoto (山本 耕史, Yamamoto Kōji)
- Jun Fukuzoe (福添 准, Fukuzoe Jun): Kazuya Kojima (児嶋 一哉, Kojima Kazuya)
- Korenosuke Hiden (飛電 是之助, Hiden Korenosuke): Tokuma Nishioka (西岡 德馬, Nishioka Tokuma)

Zi-O cast

- Sougo Tokiwa (常磐 ソウゴ, Tokiwa Sōgo): So Okuno (奥野 壮, Okuno Sō)
- Geiz Myokoin (明光院 ゲイツ, Myōkōin Geitsu): Gaku Oshida (押田 岳, Oshida Gaku)
- Tsukuyomi (ツクヨミ): Shieri Ohata (大幡 しえり, Ōhata Shieri)
- Woz (ウォズ, Wozu): Keisuke Watanabe (渡邊 圭祐, Watanabe Keisuke)

Reiwa The First Generation cast

- Will (ウィル, Wiru): Sōkō Wada (和田 聰宏, Wada Sōkō)
- Finis (フィーニス, Fīnisu): Rina Ikoma (生駒 里奈, Ikoma Rina):
- Teacher Humagear: Shin Nagahama (長濱 慎, Nagahama Shin)
- Student Humagear: Terumi Hiraiwa (平岩 輝海, Hiraiwa Terumi)
- Nurse Humagear: Yuka Yoshimura (吉村 優花, Yoshimura Yuka)
- Resistance members: Ryuji Kasahara (笠原 竜司, Kasahara Ryūji), Hayato Takenaka (竹中 隼人, Takenaka Hayato), Yuki Shiomi (潮見 勇輝, Shiomi Yūki), Tom Constantine (トム・コンスタンタイン, Tomu Konsutantain), Gaimon (ガイモン), Yurika Hashimoto (橋本 ゆりか, Hashimoto Yurika), Fumina Suzuki (鈴木 ふみ奈, Suzuki Fumina), Yusuke Sano (佐野 祐介, Sano Yūsuke), Takayuki Satō (佐藤 隆幸, Satō Takayuki), Ryō Terasawa (寺沢 了, Terasawa Ryō)
- Civilians: Happy Endo (ハッピー遠藤, Happī Endō), Kenji Hada (羽田 謙治, Hada Kenji), Koichi Wakui (和久井 幸一, Wakui Kōichi), Zenta Umegaki (梅垣 然太, Umegaki Zenta), Yūji Takahata (高畑 祐史, Takahata Yūji), Yuzu Ōhira (大平 ゆず, Ōhira Yuzu), Yoshiyuki Yamada (山田 良行, Yamada Yoshiyuki), Tomoko Kitano (北野 知子, Kitano Tomoko), Akira Shinomiya (篠宮 暁, Shinomiya Akira)

=== Voiceover roles ===
- Another 1 (アナザー1号, Anazā Ichigō): Kōji Ishii (石井 康嗣, Ishii Kōji)
- Kamen Rider Thouser (仮面ライダーサウザー, Kamen Raidā Sauzā): Nachi Sakuragi (桜木 那智, Sakuragi Nachi)

== Theme song ==
- ""Another Daybreak" 01 Movie Edition"
  - Lyrics: Takanori Nishikawa+Yuyoyuppe
  - Composition: J
  - Arrangement: J×Takanori Nishikawa and DJ'Tekina//Something
  - Artist: J×Takanori Nishikawa

== Reception ==
Kamen Rider Reiwa The First Generation grossed $7,529,337 at the box office.
