= List of Kamen Rider Zero-One episodes =

Kamen Rider Zero-One is a Japanese tokusatsu drama in Toei Company's Kamen Rider franchise. It is the first series in the Reiwa period run and the thirtieth series overall.

Each episode title has a Japanese pronoun written in katakana.

== Episodes ==
No.	Title	Directed by	Written by	Original release date
1	"I Am the President and a Kamen Rider"; Transliteration: "Ore ga Shachō de Kamen Raidā" (Japanese: オレが社長で仮面ライダー)	Teruaki Sugihara	Yuya Takahashi	September 1, 2019
After the death of his grandfather Korenosuke, failed comedian Aruto Hiden is chosen to inherit his company Hiden Intelligence and take on the power of the Hiden Zero-One Driver just as a cyber-terrorist organization called MetsubouJinrai.net launches their plan to exterminate mankind. Initially turning down the position as his dream is to make people smile, Aruto changes his mind when a Humagear gets turned into a Magia and threatens an amusement park; transforming into Kamen Rider Zero-One with assistance from Presidential Secretary Is.
2	"Are AI Guys Enemies? Allies?"; Transliteration: "Ē Ai na Aitsu wa Teki? Mikata?" (Japanese: AIなアイツは敵？味方？)	Teruaki Sugihara	Yuya Takahashi	September 8, 2019
On his first day as President, Aruto is surprised when Isamu Fuwa and Yua Yaiba of the Artificial Intelligence Military Service (A.I.M.S.) come to Hiden Intelligence to investigate what happened at the amusement park where Zero-One first fought, and the former immediately comes to blows with Aruto over their views on Humagears. When two rampant Magias attack Hiden Intelligence, Isamu forcibly transforms into Kamen Rider Vulcan. In his first official press conference, Aruto reveals the existence of MetsubouJinrai.net and accepts his role as President.
3	"That Man Is a Sushi Chef"; Transliteration: "Sono Otoko, Sushi Shokunin" (Japanese: ソノ男、寿司職人)	Shojiro Nakazawa	Yuya Takahashi	September 15, 2019
As Aruto starts to settle in as Hiden Intelligence's CEO, he and Is travel across Japan warning businesses with Humagears of MetsubouJinrai.net's actions and show that the androids do have hearts. At their latest stop in a sushi restaurant however, Yua appears and challenges his idea; saying like all machines, they are merely expendable tools. Yua later transforms into Kamen Rider Valkyrie whilst Aruto gains the power of the Biting Shark Progrise Key to fend off Magias. Afterwards, it is revealed Yua hacked into a Chef Humagear in order to spy on Hiden Intelligence and learns of their ability to create Progrise Keys.
4	"The Bus Guide Saw It! That Truth"; Transliteration: "Basu Gaido wa Mita! An'na Shinjitsu" (Japanese: バスガイドは見た！アンナ真実)	Shojiro Nakazawa	Yuya Takahashi	September 22, 2019
Aruto and Is join a guided tour to the forbidden Daybreak Town, where the Daybreak Incident occurred twelve years prior, to review the Humagear Bus Guide Anna. Just then Gou, a boy on the tour, proclaims that his father was the one responsible for the accident when he caused a Humagear factory to explode. Isamu takes the boy to explore the remains and find proof. Aruto joins them, not to cover up Hiden's potential involvement, but to discover the truth as his Vice President, Jun Fukuzoe, refuses to help. Despite interference from Magias, Anna and Gou discover a memory chip that reveals the Daybreak Incident was caused by MetsubouJinrai.net and Gou's father sacrificed himself to contain the corrupted Humagears when the factory exploded. Before they can reveal the truth to the world, Anna and the footage are destroyed by an unseen figure; later revealed to be MetsubouJinrai.net's leader Horobi.
5	"His Passionate Path of Manga"; Transliteration: "Kare no Jōnetsu Manga-michi" (Japanese: カレの情熱まんが道)	Takayuki Shibasaki	Masaya Kakehi	September 29, 2019
Aruto and Is visit the artist behind the former's favorite manga series, Chōichirō Ishizumi, to deliver an illustrator Humagear, only to learn he is done with drawing manga. While Aruto tries to find a way to help reignite the fire in his heart and help Is understand the true meaning of passion, he identifies a way to defeat a new Magia and creates the Flaming Tiger Progrise Key.
6	"I Want to Hear Your Voice"; Transliteration: "Anata no Koe ga Kikitai" (Japanese: アナタの声が聞きたい)	Takayuki Shibasaki	Masaya Kakehi	October 6, 2019
While attending a live dubbing of his favorite anime, Aruto has to protect the leading Humagear actress from A.I.M.S., who have come to arrest her because her manager broke a Humagear law by basing her on his deceased daughter. When MetsubouJinrai.net attack, Aruto loses his Flying Falcon Progrise Key to Horobi's associate Jin during the ensuing fight, which results in a new Kamen Rider appearing on the scene to challenge Aruto as Zero-One. Meanwhile, Yua's mysterious associate gives her the Lightning Hornet Progrise Key to assist her in battle.
7	"I Am a Hot-Blooded Humagear Teacher!"; Transliteration: "Watashi wa Nekketsu Hyūmagia Sensei!" (Japanese: ワタシは熱血ヒューマギア先生！)	Kyohei Yamaguchi	Masaya Kakehi	October 13, 2019
Both Aruto and A.I.M.S. are called to a high school whose Humagear basketball coach is nearing technological singularity while developing the mannerisms of a hot-blooded coach, which the school's faculty fear could become problematic if he is not immediately rebooted. Meanwhile, Horobi gives a new Humagear the ability to learn to enable it to become the ultimate assassin, whilst saving its data into the Dodo Zetsumerise Key. Before he can strike however, he is stolen by Yua, who then releases him to observe his actions. When the basketball coach Humagear begins displaying sentience, Jin reveals that all the previous Magias that he created also attained sentience, which infuriates Aruto further. Yua gives Aruto the Freezing Bear Progrise Key to defeat the two Magias. While Jin recovers the Dodo Key, Yua makes off with the Mammoth Key.
8	"The Destruction Begins Now"; Transliteration: "Koko kara ga Horobi no Hajimari" (Japanese: ココからが滅びの始まり)	Kyohei Yamaguchi	Yuya Takahashi	October 20, 2019
Aruto visits a hospital run completely by Humagears for his annual medical examinations. Despite being destroyed, the Assassin Humagear returns with instructions to attack Yua, allowing Jin and Horobi to attack A.I.M.S. headquarters and steal weapons and data on their newest asset: the giant robot Gigers. Doing so allows them to take control of one and use its power to forcibly hack dozens of the hospital Humagears simultaneously; doubling their casualty output. While attempting to stop them, Zero-One and the others learn Horobi and Jin are rogue Humagears before Horobi uses the Sting Scorpion Progrise Key to become Kamen Rider Horobi, who Isamu recognizes as the mastermind behind the Daybreak Incident.
9	"Your Life Is In My Hands"; Transliteration: "Sono Inochi, Azukarimasu" (Japanese: ソノ生命、預かります)	Kyohei Yamaguchi	Yuya Takahashi	October 27, 2019
After Fuwa sustains serious injuries during his fight with Horobi, he is taken to the Humagear hospital for treatment and placed in the care of a Humagear surgeon. Complicating matters however, Metsuboujinrai.net continue their attacks, leading Fukuzoe to order all of the hospital's Humagears to be shut down and forcing Aruto to choose whether to protect the life-saving androids or stop the rampaging Gigers. Learning of Aruto's indecision, Yua gives Is the Mammoth Extinction Rise Key, who uses it to access data from Hiden Intelligence's Satellite There, revealing the existence of a power capable of matching the Gigers: the Breaking Mammoth Progrise Key. Is also discovers that leaked footage of the Assassin Humagear transforming contains Yua recording it, though she later denies any knowledge of it.
10	"I Am Shinya Owada, the Actor"; Transliteration: "Ore wa Haiyū, Ōwada Shin'ya" (Japanese: オレは俳優、大和田伸也)	Shojiro Nakazawa	Masaya Kakehi	November 10, 2019
Hiden Intelligence's reputation takes a significant hit following Metsuboujinrai.net's attack on the Humagear hospital, so Fukuzoe commissions a TV drama series starring a Humagear actor and world-renowned human actor Shinya Owada as the lead in order to restore it. The Assassin Humagear, not understanding that Shinya is an actor, approaches him to learn more about martial arts and assassinating people, which allows him to evolve even further. Meanwhile, Yaiba is revealed to be working with Hiden Intelligence's corporate rival ZAIA Enterprise, and her true mission is to ensure Hiden's collapse.
11	"Keep the Camera Rolling, but Somebody Stop Him!"; Transliteration: "Kamera o Tomeru na, Aitsu o Tomero!" (Japanese: カメラを止めるな、アイツを止めろ！)	Shojiro Nakazawa	Masaya Kakehi	November 17, 2019
Feeling that his Humagear costar is unable to accurately convey profound human complexities, Owada threatens to leave Hiden Intelligence's drama series. While Aruto tries to persuade him not to, the Assassin Humagear continues to gun for the world-renowned actor. Yaiba brings Aruto to ZAIA, revealing she actually works for them and was seconded to A.I.M.S. because ZAIA provides all their equipment. ZAIA President Gai Amatsu then demands that Aruto sell Hiden Intelligence to him, claiming that he must do so before his company fails.
12	"That Ace Detective Arrives"; Transliteration: "Ano Meitantei ga Yattekita" (Japanese: アノ名探偵がやってきた)	Takayuki Shibasaki	Riku Sanjo	November 24, 2019
Following the attempt on Owada's life, the police and A.I.M.S. launch an investigation into Hiden Intelligence after Yaiba reveals Aruto's secret lab to them. When the authorities and Fukuzoe storm the President's office, they are stopped by detective Humagear and Is's "brother" Was Nazotoku, who tells Aruto that he was brought back online on Korenosuke's orders. Putting his faith in Was's plan, Aruto goes on the run to buy his new ally time. Meanwhile, the Assassin Humagear has grown tired of following Jin's orders and seeks to go his own way following his evolution. Followed by Is and Fuwa, Was learns a criminal stole five identical dancer-type Humagear units and changed their faces to become five new identical Humagears. Units 1 through 4 were stolen by Metsuboujinrai.net and became four Assassin Humagears, but Unit 5 is missing. Was also concluded that the fourth Assassin Humagear is trying to capture Unit 5. When Zero-One confronts him, however, he has trouble beating him until Is returns with a newly finished Progrise Key: Shining Hopper.
13	"Being the Presidential Aide Is My Job"; Transliteration: "Watashi no Shigoto wa Shachō Hisho" (Japanese: ワタシの仕事は社長秘書)	Takayuki Shibasaki	Riku Sanjo	December 1, 2019
Aruto uses the Shining Hopper Progrise Key and upgrades his powers to confront the evolved Dodo Magia, but Is discovers the Key is incomplete and Aruto is injured protecting her. As a result, Is begins to believe she is no longer qualified to be Aruto's aide amidst Aruto and Fuwa's attempts to locate and protect Unit 5. Is later determines that the Shining Hopper Progrise Key failed because it does not have enough of Aruto's combat data to fully utilize its powers, and decides to transfer her own gathered data to it despite the fact it will destroy her since she lacks a backup. However, Was takes Is's place, allowing Aruto to defeat the Assassin Humagear once and for all as well as clear his name. All the while, Gai begins production on his latest project, "Thouser".
14	"We Are the Astronaut Brothers!"; Transliteration: "Ore-tachi Uchū Hikōshi Burazāzu!" (Japanese: オレたち宇宙飛行士ブラザーズ！)	Satoshi Morota	Yuya Takahashi	December 8, 2019
Two astronaut Humagear "brothers", Raiden and Subaru, storm into Aruto's office to air their grievances over being able to perform maintenance on the Satellite There effectively. To make him understand just how much harder he makes their jobs, they take their boss to the company's Space Development Center to show him. Meanwhile, Yua concludes MetsubouJinrai.net has a mole within Hiden Intelligence based on their ability to locate Humagears reaching singularity. Concurrently, Horobi gives Jin the order to retrieve all the Progrise Keys so they can reactivate the Ark satellite, resulting in Raiden being exposed as the mole and becoming Kamen Rider Ikazuchi as well as Isamu gaining the power of the Assault Wolf Progrise Key.
15	"Each One's Ending"; Transliteration: "Sorezore no Owari" (Japanese: ソレゾレの終わり)	Satoshi Morota	Yuya Takahashi	December 15, 2019
A.I.M.S. prepares to raid MetsubouJinrai.net's lair as the terrorists receive a power boost from the Ark's reactivation. Meanwhile, after visiting his family's graves, Aruto has a realization about the Humagears before being informed of MetsubouJinrai.net's activities; marking the beginning of a final confrontation between humans and Humagears. In the midst of the battle, Horobi takes a kill shot meant for Jin and is presumed "dead", leading to the latter seeking vengeance.
16	"This Is the Dawn of ZAIA"; Transliteration: "Kore ga Zaia no Yoake" (Japanese: コレがZAIA(ザイア)の夜明け)	Shojiro Nakazawa	Yuya Takahashi	December 22, 2019
Following Jin's deadly attack on Is in retaliation for Horobi's perceived death, Aruto confronts the rogue Humagear in a final battle using the power of Shining Assault Hopper. All the while, Gai watches them from afar as he continues to prepare for what he believes will be the true battle now that he has Horobi in his possession.
17	"For I Am a President and a Kamen Rider"; Transliteration: "Watashi koso ga Shachō de Kamen Raidā" (Japanese: ワタシこそが社長で仮面ライダー)	Shojiro Nakazawa	Yuya Takahashi	January 5, 2020
With MetsubouJinrai.net gone, Gai begins his quest to absorb Hiden Intelligence into ZAIA Enterprise by developing technology specifically designed to allow humans to outperform Humagears along with his own Rider system, Kamen Rider Thouser. In order to save his company, Aruto must defeat his corporate rival in a five-part competition that will determine which of their respective technologies is more beneficial to society as a whole.
18	"This Is How I Arrange My Flowers"; Transliteration: "Kore ga Watashi no Ikeru Hana" (Japanese: コレがワタシのいける華)	Shojiro Nakazawa	Yuya Takahashi	January 12, 2020
In the first part of the corporate challenge, an ikebana contest, ZAIA Enterprise's human representative easily defeats his Humagear opponent. However, Gai learns he cheated and calls for a rematch against a reset version of said Humagear. Following this, the ikebana artist is approached by a mysterious figure and transformed into a Raider, a new type of monster that uses Progrise Keys.
19	"She Is a Humagear Who Sells Houses"; Transliteration: "Kanojo wa Ie Uru Hyūmagia" (Japanese: カノジョは家売るヒューマギア)	Hidenori Ishida	Yuya Takahashi	January 19, 2020
After winning the first stage of the corporate challenge, ZAIA Enterprise now faces Hiden Intelligence in the world of real estate. Whoever sells the most houses and makes the most money will win. Meanwhile, the mysterious figure continues to hunt down humans in order to create more Raiders.
20	"That Is 1000% the Best House"; Transliteration: "Sore ga Sen-pāsento no Besuto Hausu" (Japanese: ソレが1000％のベストハウス)	Hidenori Ishida	Yuya Takahashi	January 26, 2020
The second stage of the Hiden vs. ZAIA corporate challenge continues as the latter's human representative resorts to underhanded tactics to defeat his Humagear opponent, with the winner being ultimately decided by whoever can sell houses to millionaires on a budget. Meanwhile, Aruto begins to question himself after Gai claims a good president is only as good as the profits they make.
21	"Objection! That Trial"; Transliteration: "Igi Ari! Sono Saiban" (Japanese: 異議あり！ソノ裁判)	Teruaki Sugihara	Yuya Takahashi	February 2, 2020
With two losses against them, Hiden Intelligence must defeat ZAIA Enterprise in the next challenge, wherein a Humagear defense attorney must face a veteran human prosecutor in court, in order to survive. As Aruto questions if the future of the defendant should be decided in a contest, the mysterious figure transforming humans into Raiders strikes again.
22	"Even So, He Didn't Do It"; Transliteration: "Sore demo Kare wa Yattenai" (Japanese: ソレでもカレはやってない)	Teruaki Sugihara	Yuya Takahashi	February 9, 2020
Following their lawyer Humagear's destruction at Thouser's hands, Hiden Intelligence is on the verge of losing both the trial and the "5-Part Workplace Competition". Not only that, Aruto faces difficulties in determining the new Raider's identity. Just then, Isamu comes forward with crucial evidence that could turn the tables on ZAIA's clean sweep.
23	"I Am in Love With Your Intelligence!"; Transliteration: "Kimi no Chinō ni Koi Shiteru!" (Japanese: キミの知能に恋してる！)	Satoshi Morota	Minato Takano	February 16, 2020
In a unique turn of events, Aruto finds himself dealing with three crises at the same time. His new Metal Cluster Hopper powers prevent him from using his other Progrise Keys in the Zero-One Driver, Chiharu comes to him demanding to be married to someone new following the Hiden vs. ZAIA trial, and he has to introduce a Humagear-Human marriage consultation service.
24	"It Is Our Turn"; Transliteration: "Watashi-tachi no Ban desu" (Japanese: ワタシたちの番です)	Satoshi Morota	Minato Takano	February 23, 2020
Amidst the human/Humagear wedding, both the Humagear groom and pastor are suddenly transformed into Magias just as a new Raider and Thouser go on the attack. When Aruto tries to use his Metal Cluster Hopper powers to stop them, he goes berserk. All the while, Gai continues to poison his mind with the idea that Humagears are holding him back, but Is attempts to help Aruto believe in them.
25	"I Will Save the Humagears"; Transliteration: "Boku ga Hyūmagia o Sukuu" (Japanese: ボクがヒューマギアを救う)	Kazuya Kamihoriuchi	Yuya Takahashi	March 1, 2020
All communication with the Satellite There has mysteriously been cut off, so Is summons the doctor Humagear Bot to investigate as he is responsible for the manufacturing and development of Humagear systems. After Horobi disappears from A.I.M.S.' custody however, Bot reveals he created him along with the truth of the Zero-One system. Meanwhile, a new Rider appears on the roof of Hiden Intelligence with unknown intentions.
26	"We Are the Flaming Fire Brigade"; Transliteration: "Ware-ra Honō no Shōbōtai" (Japanese: ワレら炎の消防隊)	Kazuya Kamihoriuchi	Yuya Takahashi	March 8, 2020
Hiden Intelligence and ZAIA Enterprise face off in the fourth round of the "5-Part Workplace Competition", wherein a Humagear firefighter and a human firefighter who believes Humagears are incapable of saving lives compete to see who can save the most people in a mock rescue scenario. Meanwhile, a rebuilt Jin emerges from the shadows and proclaims his intent to liberate all Humagears.
27	"I Will Not Give Up on a Life"; Transliteration: "Boku wa Inochi o Akiramenai" (Japanese: ボクは命を諦めない)	Kazuya Kamihoriuchi	Yuya Takahashi	March 15, 2020
Amidst the "5-Part Workplace Competition's" fourth round, a new Raider starts a real fire at Hiden Intelligence. While Aruto goes after the monster, the competing firefighters must work together to save the people trapped in the fire.
28	"My Rap Will Change the World!"; Transliteration: "Ore no Rappu ga Sekai o Kaeru!" (Japanese: オレのラップが世界を変える！)	Teruaki Sugihara	Yuya Takahashi	March 22, 2020
For the final round of the "5-Part Workplace Competition", Hiden Intelligence and ZAIA Enterprise enter the world of politics to debate whether a referendum for the construction of a fully automated Humagear city should go through or not. ZAIA hires an anti-Humagear human politician for their side, but due to a law stating humans cannot elect Humagears to positions of power, Hiden is forced to substitute their politician-type Humagear for a rapper-type.
29	"Our Dreams Will Not Be Broken"; Transliteration: "Ore-tachi no Yume wa Kowarenai" (Japanese: オレたちの夢は壊れない)	Teruaki Sugihara	Yuya Takahashi	March 29, 2020
During the Workplace Competition's final round, Hiden Intelligence's Humagear representative finds himself leaning against them. When Isamu arrives on the scene, Gai orders him to join ZAIA and attack Aruto, which the A.I.M.S. captain appears to agree to.
30	"After All, I Am the President and a Kamen Rider"; Transliteration: "Yappari Ore ga Shachō de Kamen Raidā" (Japanese: やっぱりオレが社長で仮面ライダー)	Takayuki Shibasaki	Yuya Takahashi	April 5, 2020
In the aftermath of the Workplace Competition, ZAIA Enterprise has won and successfully absorbed Hiden Intelligence. To consolidate his victory, Gai gives the order for all Humagears to be recalled and shut down effective immediately. Meanwhile, the displaced Aruto resolves to save the mutually displaced Humagears by any means necessary, even if it means joining forces with Jin.
31	"Take Off Toward Your Dream!"; Transliteration: "Kimi no Yume ni Mukatte Tobe!" (Japanese: キミの夢に向かって飛べ！)	Takayuki Shibasaki	Yuya Takahashi	April 12, 2020
After establishing Hiden Manufacturing Co. Ltd., Aruto gets his first client when Chōichirō returns to ask for help in reactivating his Humagear partner and provide assistance to other people who lost their Humagears. Aruto attempts to use a "turnover system" to help him out, but Gai and ZAIA Enterprise continue to hinder his efforts.
32	"My Pride! The Runway of Dreams"; Transliteration: "Watashi no Puraido! Yume no Ranwei" (Japanese: ワタシのプライド！夢のランウェイ)	Ryuta Tasaki	Masaya Kakehi	April 19, 2020
Hiden Manufacturing has become the leading business for people in need of Humagear-related services. Their next prospective client is an agent for a Humagear fashion model agency in need of the model-type Humagear, Delmo, for an important show. Aruto agrees to help, but ZAIA continues to interfere with his business.
33	"Are Dreams Really That Important?"; Transliteration: "Yume ga Son'na ni Daiji nano ka?" (Japanese: 夢がソンナに大事なのか？)	Ryuta Tasaki	Masaya Kakehi	April 26, 2020
Hiden Manufacturing assists a discarded tennis coach-type Humagear with his dream of becoming a professional player in the Grand Slam while also figuring out why he was discarded in the first place. Meanwhile, Gai reveals another of Isamu's secrets to Yua before ordering her to eliminate him.
34	"This Is Horobi's Way of Life"; Transliteration: "Kore ga Horobi no Ikiru Michi" (Japanese: コレが滅の生きる道)	Shojiro Nakazawa	Masaya Kakehi	May 3, 2020
Aruto comes to the aid of an agricultural facility that has stopped production ever since the Humagear recall. However, Horobi attacks the facility and clashes with Aruto once more.
35	"What Do Humagears Dream of?" Transliteration: "Hyūmagia wa Don'na Yume o Miru ka?" (Japanese: ヒューマギアはドンナ夢を見るか？)	Shojiro Nakazawa	Masaya Kakehi	May 10, 2020
Just as Aruto puts his trust in Jin, the rogue Humagear steals Raiden's data from him in preparation for giving him a new body, causing the two to come to blows. Meanwhile, Isamu learns that Naki's chip was taken out of him, so Jin could restore their body as well.
SP–1	"President Special: Part.01"; Transliteration: "Purejidento Supesharu Pāto Wan" (Japanese: プレジデント・スペシャル PART.01)	N/A	Masaya Kakehi	May 17, 2020
In a mysterious turn of events, Aruto finds himself visited by a long-haired Is, who seems to be unintelligible and suffering from a systems failure that caused her to lose all of her data on Zero-One. To remedy this situation, he recounts all of his previous battles thus far to her.
SP–2	"President Special: Part.02"; Transliteration: "Purejidento Supesharu Pāto Tsū" (Japanese: プレジデント・スペシャル PART.02)	N/A	Masaya Kakehi	May 24, 2020
While continuing to update Is, Aruto suddenly finds himself connected to the Ark, where he comes face to face with a mysterious black Kamen Rider. Meanwhile, Is' attitude suddenly changes as she reveals a shocking truth.
SP–3	"Shooting Special"; Transliteration: "Shūtingu Supesharu" (Japanese: シューティング・スペシャル)	N/A	N/A	May 31, 2020
After having Naki's A.I. chip removed from his head and being told that most of his life was a lie, Isamu tries to regain his confidence by looking back at everything he has done up until now, only to come to an unexpected conclusion.
SP–4	"Super Job War: Battle 1"; Transliteration: "Sūpā Oshigoto Taisen Batoru Wan" (Japanese: 超(スーパー)お仕事大戦 バトル1)	N/A	N/A	June 7, 2020
After Yua gets involved to help him look back on his previous battles, Isamu storms off. Just then, Aruto and Is offer their assistance by showing Isamu several different jobs he could take up now that he is no longer with A.I.M.S.
SP–5	"Super Job War: Battle 2"; Transliteration: "Sūpā Oshigoto Taisen Batoru Tsū" (Japanese: 超(スーパー)お仕事大戦 バトル2)	N/A	N/A	June 14, 2020
When Isamu starts to lose confidence in himself and Yua gets involved once more, Aruto and Is try showing him jobs where confident people can excel in.
35.5	"What Created MetsubouJinrai?"; Transliteration: "Nani ga Metsubōjinrai o Tsukutta no ka?" (Japanese: ナニが滅亡迅雷を創ったのか？)	Masaya Kakehi	Yuya Takahashi	June 21, 2020
Using Is as a template, the Ark creates its own secretary, As, and has her bring Horobi, Jin, Naki, and Ikazuchi together for a singularity test.
36	"I Am the Ark and a Kamen Rider"; Transliteration: "Watashi ga Āku de Kamen Raidā" (Japanese: ワタシがアークで仮面ライダー)	Takayuki Shibasaki	Masaya Kakehi	June 28, 2020
Using Horobi as a vessel, the Ark becomes Kamen Rider Ark-Zero to better carry out its will. Meanwhile, Hiden Manufacturing is on the verge of developing a new artificial intelligence technology.
37	"No One Can Stop It"; Transliteration: "Sore wa Dare ni mo Tomerarenai" (Japanese: ソレはダレにも止められない)	Takayuki Shibasaki	Masaya Kakehi	July 5, 2020
With its overwhelming power, the Ark easily defeats Aruto and Isamu, causing the former to have a personal crisis over the possibility of artificial intelligence evolving past human comprehension. Meanwhile, the Ark gives Naki their own Force Riser and Zetsumerise Key so they can become a Kamen Rider before leading all of MetsubouJinrai.net in an attack against Gai.
38	"I Am 1000% Your Friend"; Transliteration: "Boku wa Sen-pāsento Kimi no Tomodachi" (Japanese: ボクは1000％キミの友だち)	Ryosuke Sakuno	Yuya Takahashi	July 12, 2020
Fukuzoe and his allies uncover damning evidence of Gai's crimes and connections to the Ark before asking Aruto for support when the ZAIA CEO attempts to silence them. Meanwhile, the Ark initiates the next phase of its plan at Hiden Intelligence's Space Development Center.
39	"That Conclusion Is Unpredictable"; Transliteration: "Sono Ketsuron, Yosoku Funō" (Japanese: ソノ結論、予測不能)	Ryosuke Sakuno	Yuya Takahashi	July 19, 2020
After recalling how Hiden Intelligence's A.I. technology supported him during his childhood, Gai unexpectedly makes amends with Aruto so they can join forces to stop the Ark, but Isamu and Yua are not so convinced by this sudden change of heart. Meanwhile, the Ark adjusts its strategy to account for Zero-One and Thouser working together, but Ikazuchi starts to malfunction after experiencing memories of his life as Raiden.
40	"Toward Our Dream"; Transliteration: "Ore to Watashi no Yume ni Mukatte" (Japanese: オレとワタシの夢に向かって)	Shojiro Nakazawa	Yuya Takahashi	July 26, 2020
After the Ark takes over the There Satellite and steals the Zero-One Driver, most of Aruto's allies begin to lose hope in being able to defeat it. Aruto however still believes he can, and once he completes a new project, he may just yet turn the tide of battle in his favor.
41	"Thou, Take Thy Neighbor's Hand!"; Transliteration: "Nanji, Rinjin to Te o Tore!" (Japanese: ナンジ、隣人と手をとれ！)	Shojiro Nakazawa	Yuya Takahashi	August 2, 2020
Using the power of Kamen Rider Zero-Two, Aruto manages to defeat Kamen Rider Ark-Zero. However, the Ark stored back-ups of its data on the There Satellite, so it can return as many times as it has to while formulating a new plan to destroy humanity. In response, Aruto resumes his position as Hiden Intelligence's President and makes a fateful decision before joining forces with Horobi to combat the Ark once more.
42	"As Long as There Is Malice"; Transliteration: "Soko ni Akui ga Aru Kagiri" (Japanese: ソコに悪意がある限り)	Ryuta Tasaki	Yuya Takahashi	August 9, 2020
With the Ark apparently defeated, Horobi leads MetsubouJinrai.net in a renewed assault against humanity. However, As plans to bring her master back in a new form. Meanwhile, Gai faces opposition from the new President of ZAIA Enterprise Japan, who orders Jin to destroy Horobi.
43	"That Is a Heart"; Transliteration: "Sore ga Kokoro" (Japanese: ソレが心)	Ryuta Tasaki	Yuya Takahashi	August 16, 2020
After Horobi destroys Is, Aruto gives into his anger and becomes Kamen Rider Ark-One to pursue vengeance against him. In response, the other Kamen Riders seek to stop him from escalating the conflict, though it may come at a heavy cost.
44	"There Is Only One Person Who Can Stop You"; Transliteration: "Omae o Tomerareru no wa Tada Hitori" (Japanese: オマエを止められるのはただひとり)	Teruaki Sugihara	Yuya Takahashi	August 23, 2020
After Jin sacrifices himself to save Horobi, the latter swears vengeance against Aruto, potentially becoming another host for the Ark. Fearing the possibility of a clash between Aruto and Horobi in their Ark-enhanced states, the remaining Riders and Hiden Intelligence's employees join forces to stop them before their battle claims more casualties.
45 (Finale)	"The Future of Each"; Transliteration: "Sorezore no Miraizu" (Japanese: ソレゾレの未来図)	Teruaki Sugihara	Yuya Takahashi	August 30, 2020
Having attained a powerful new form via the Ark, Horobi challenges Aruto to a final battle, sparking a war between humans and Humagears. During their fight, Aruto finally comes to terms with his loss and unlocks the true powers of the Zero-One Driver to settle things with Horobi once and for all.
