= Fumiya Takahashi =

Japanese actor (born 2001)

- 高橋文哉
- Born: March 12, 2001 (age 25); Kasukabe, Saitama, Japan
- Occupation: Actor
- Years active: 2018–present
- Agent: A-Plus
- Website: Official Website

Fumiya Takahashi (高橋 文哉, Takahashi Fumiya; born March 12, 2001) is a Japanese actor and model. He is best known for his lead roles in Kamen Rider Zero-One.

== Early life ==
Takahashi was born on March 12, 2001, in Saitama Prefecture, Japan. He rose to prominence in 2017 after winning the grand prize in the Male High Schooler Mr. Contest, which led to his entry into the entertainment industry.

== Career ==
=== 2017–2018: Early beginnings ===
Takahashi first entered the public eye in 2017, when he won the Male High Schooler Mr. Contest in December, which propelled him into the entertainment industry. He subsequently began to appear in television shows and other media. His public debut came in 2018 with his first television appearance on Nippon TV’s Tokuson: Life Hacks!, which aired in April of that year. Takahashi's appearance on the show marked his first television exposure, where he began to gain attention from viewers.

That same year, Takahashi made his stage acting debut in the stage play Taishō Roman Tantei Dan: Muttsu no Maria Zo in April 2018. This marked his entry into acting, moving beyond his appearances in variety shows. Takahashi also participated in Ameba TV's reality show Who Is the Wolf? in Q3, where he became one of the most talked-about contestants. His appearance increased his visibility, with audiences dubbing him "the top handsome high schooler in Japan" due to his good looks and personality.

=== 2019–2021: Kamen Rider and drama roles ===
In July 2019, Takahashi was revealed as the lead in Kamen Rider Zero-One, the first Kamen Rider series of the Reiwa era. This role, as Aruto Hiden, was a major step in his career, making him the first Kamen Rider actor born in the 21st century. He was also the first participant in Male High Schooler Mr. Contest who played the lead role of a Kamen Rider work. (Note: Rio Komiya, who participated in "Male High Schooler Mr. Contest 2018", played the lead role in Mashin Sentai Kiramager, becoming the first participant of the contest to play a main role in the Super Sentai series.) Kamen Rider Zero-One aired from September 2019 to August 2020, and Takahashi’s portrayal of the protagonist helped solidify his presence in the entertainment industry.

After wrapping up his role in Kamen Rider Zero-One, Takahashi transitioned to more dramatic roles. In 2020, he appeared in the TV Asahi drama Sensei wo Kesu Hōteishiki., playing Tōya Fujiwara. His role in this series marked his first post-Kamen Rider television drama, expanding his range beyond action roles. He joined the filming of the drama series only four days after the end of filming process for Kamen Rider Zero-One the Movie: Real×Time. He also appeared in the drama Captivated, by You, playing another student character.

In 2021, Takahashi took on a lead role in the prime-time TBS drama Kikazaranai Koi ni wa Riyū ga Atte as Akira Nikaidō. He also starred in the drama Saiai, which was well-received for his performance.

=== 2022–2023: Voice acting and other ventures ===
Takahashi starred in the romantic drama I Will Be Your Bloom in 2022. He portrayed Dan Sagami, the leader, center, and songwriter of the fictional boy group, 8LOOM. 8LOOM debuted as a musical act outside of the television series.

In 2023, Takahashi voiced the character Jester Garandaros in the anime movie Black Clover: Sword of the Wizard King. Later that year, he marked his first lead role in a primetime drama with Fermat's Cuisine, based on the manga series by Yūgo Kobayashi. In the drama, Takahashi played Gaku Kitada, a mathematical genius who becomes a chef. He also starred in Our Secret Diary as Jun Setoyama, his first lead role in a romantic film. For his performance, Takahashi received the Newcomer of the Year award at the 47th Japan Academy Film Prize.

=== 2024–present ===
In 2024, Takahashi took on a dual role in the drama Densetsu no Head Shō, portraying both Sho Ijuin and Tatsuhito Yamada. He also portrayed Nishikita in the manga-based film, Teasing Master, Takagi-San: The Movie.

In February 2025, he was awarded Newcomer of the Year at the Elan d'Or Awards, recognizing his rising talent and continued success in the entertainment industry.

== Filmography ==
=== Film ===
Year	Title	Role	Notes	Ref.
2019	Kamen Rider Zi-O the Movie: Over Quartzer	Aruto Hiden / Kamen Rider Zero-One	Voice only, cameo	
2019	Kamen Rider Reiwa The First Generation	Aruto Hiden / Kamen Rider Zero-One	Lead role	
2020	Kamen Rider Zero-One the Movie: Real×Time	Aruto Hiden / Kamen Rider Zero-One	Lead role	
2021	Saber + Zenkaiger: Super Hero Senki	Aruto Hiden / Kamen Rider Zero-One		
2021	Kaguya-sama Final: Love Is War	Kō Ogino		
2021	DIVOC-12	Saitō		
2022	Ox-Head Village	Shōta Sakuragi		
2023	Black Clover: Sword of the Wizard King	Jester Garandaros	Voice only	
2023	Our Secret Diary	Jun Setoyama	Lead role	
2024	Love You as the World Ends Final	Daiwa Shibasaki		
2024	Teasing Master Takagi-san Movie	Nishikata		
2024	Blue Period	Ryuji "Yuka" Ayukawa		
2024	Who's Gone	Maruko	Lead role	
2025	The Boy and the Dog	Kazumasa Nakagaki	Lead role	
2025	On Summer Sand	Kōtarō		
2026	The Keeper of the Camphor Tree	Reito Naoi (voice)	Lead role	
2026	Sakamoto Days	Shin Asakura		
2026	Blue Lock	Yoichi Isagi	Lead role	
2027	The Real Killer			

=== Television drama ===
Year	Title	Role	Notes	Ref.
2019–20	Kamen Rider Zero-One	Aruto Hiden / Kamen Rider Zero-One	Lead role	
2020	Sensei wo Kesu Hōteishiki.	Tōya Fujiwara		
2021	Captivated, by You	Akira Nikaidō		
2021	Why I Dress Up for Love	Ryō Akiba		
2021	Ukiwa: Tanin Ijō, Tomodachi Miman	Makoto Sasaki		
2021	Bokura ga Koroshita, Saiai no Kimi	Rei Kobayashi	Lead role	
2021	Dearest	Yū Asamiya / Informant		
2022	Dr. White	Shinpei Sakuma		
2022	Bad Girl: Glass Ceiling Crushers	Shu Yamase		
2022	I Will Be Your Bloom	Dan Sagami		
2023	Themis's Law School Classroom	Shintarō Manaka		
2023	Fermat's Cuisine	Gaku Kitada	Lead role	
2024	Legendary Boss Sho	Sho Ijuin and Tatsuhito Yamada	Lead role	
2025	Anpan	Kentaro Karashima	Asadora	
2026	Until the T-shirt Dries	Naoto		

=== Other television ===
Year	Title	Notes	Ref.
2025	76th NHK Kōhaku Uta Gassen	He sang several songs with his co-stars from the TV drama Anpan.	

== Awards and nominations ==
Year	Award	Category	Work(s)	Result	Ref.
2024	47th Japan Academy Film Prize	Newcomer of the Year	Our Secret Diary	Won	
2025	49th Elan d'or Awards	Newcomer of the Year	Himself	Won	
