= Noa Tsurushima =

Japanese actress and model

- 鶴嶋乃愛
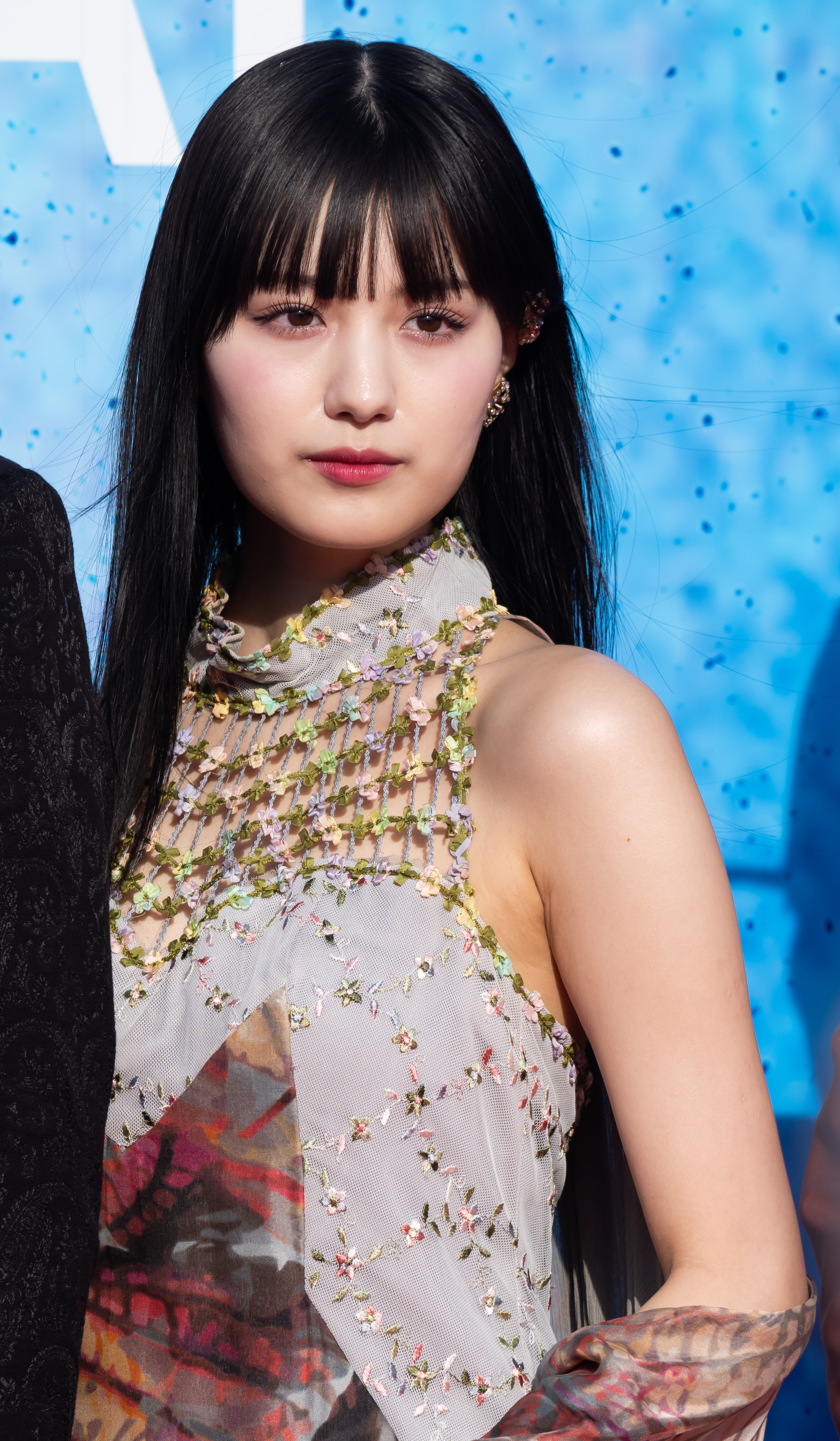
- Tsurushima at the Yokohama International; Film Festival in May 2023
- Born: 24 May 2001 (age 24); Kōchi, Japan
- Occupations: model; actress
- Years active: 2013–present
- Employer: Oscar Promotion
- Height: 163 cm (5 ft 4 in)

Noa Tsurushima (鶴嶋乃愛 Tsurushima Noa; born 24 May 2001) is a Japanese actress and model represented by Oscar Promotion.

== Early life ==
Tsurushima was born in Kōchi Prefecture, Japan on 24 May 2001.

== Filmography ==
=== Television series ===
Year	Title	Role	Other notes	Ref.
2019	Kamen Rider Zero-One	Is / As		
2023	Diary of Our Days at the Breakwater	Yūki Kuroiwa		

=== Films ===
Year	Title	Role	Other notes	Ref.
2019	Kamen Rider Reiwa The First Generation	Is		
2020	Kamen Rider Zero-One The Movie: Real X Time	Is / As		
2024	Trauma	Kana Nishijima	Lead role; anthology film	
