= Hiroe Igeta =

Japanese actress and model

- 井桁弘恵
- Born: 3 February 1997 (age 29); Fukuoka, Japan
- Education: Waseda University
- Occupations: actress, model
- Years active: 2013–present
- Agent: Box Corporation
- Website: www.box-corporation.com/hiroe_igeta

Hiroe Igeta (井桁弘恵 Igeta Hiroe; born 3 February 1997) is a Japanese actress and model.

== Early life and education ==
Igeta obtained her bachelor's in humanities from Waseda University.

== Career ==
In 2012, when she was 15, Igeta was a runner-up in Miss Teen Japan 2013. Her acting debut was in 2016 when she starred in Death Forest 5.

== Filmography ==
=== Television series ===
Year	Title	Role	Notes	Ref.
2017	Crisis: Kouan Kidou Sousatai Tokusan-han	Emi Torigoe	Episode 1	
2018	Keishicho Zero Gakari: Third Season	Rika Kikuchi	Episode 4	
2019	Kamen Rider Zero-One	Yua Yaiba/Kamen Rider Valkyrie		
2025	The Laughing Salesman	Yuko Honne	Episode 6	

=== Films ===
Year	Title	Role	Notes	Ref.
2016	Death Forest 5			
2017	Silhouette of Your Voice			
2019	You Are Brilliant Like a Spica	Saki Amakawa		
2019	The Legend of Chronos Jaunter	Kumiko Fumi		
2019	Aesop Game	Miwa Kameda	Lead role	
2019	Kamen Rider Reiwa: The First Generation	Yua Yaiba/Kamen Rider Valkyrie		
2020	Kamen Rider Zero-One: REAL×TIME	Yua Yaiba/Kamen Rider Valkyrie		
2021	Zero-One Others: Kamen Rider MetsubouJinrai	Yua Yaiba/Kamen Rider Valkyrie		
2021	Zero-One Others: Kamen Rider Vulcan & Valkyrie	Yua Yaiba/Kamen Rider Valkyrie		
2021	Good-bye	Miho		
2023	Kamaishi Ramen Monogatari	Masami	Lead role	
2026	Kyojo: Reunion	Tsumugi		
2026	Kyojo: Requiem	Tsumugi		
