= Kamen Rider Zero-One =

Japanese television drama

- Genre: Tokusatsu; Superhero fiction Science fiction Action/Adventure; Comedy-Drama; Cyberpunk
- Created by: Shotaro Ishinomori
- Written by: Yuya Takahashi (head writer)
- Directed by: Teruaki Sugihara
- Starring: Fumiya Takahashi; Ryutaro Okada; Noa Tsurushima; Hiroe Igeta; Daisuke Nakagawa; Syuya Sunagawa; Nachi Sakuragi; Daichi Yamaguchi; Satsuki Nakayama; Kazuya Kojima; Asumi Narita; Arata Saeki
- Voices of: Show Hayami; Noriko Hidaka; Maynard and Blaise Plant; Mark Wietzman
- Narrated by: Kōichi Yamadera
- Opening theme: "REAL×EYEZ" by J feat. Takanori Nishikawa
- Composer: Go Sakabe
- Country of origin: Japan
- Original language: Japanese
- No. of episodes: 45 (list of episodes)

Production
- Producers: Chihiro Inoue (TV Asahi); Kei Mizutani (TV Asahi); Takahito Ōmori (Toei)
- Running time: 25 minutes
- Production companies: TV Asahi; Toei Company; ADK Emotions

Original release
- Network: ANN (TV Asahi)
- Release: September 1, 2019 – August 30, 2020

Related
- Kamen Rider Zi-O; Kamen Rider Saber

Kamen Rider Zero-One (仮面ライダーゼロワン, Kamen Raidā Zerowan) is a Japanese tokusatsu drama series produced by Toei Company and TV Asahi. It is the 30th series in the Kamen Rider franchise and the first series in the Reiwa period. The show premiered on September 1, 2019, following Kamen Rider Zi-O's finale, and joined Kishiryu Sentai Ryusoulger, and later, Mashin Sentai Kiramager in the Super Hero Time lineup before concluding on August 30, 2020.

The series' theme revolves around technological singularity and artificial intelligence, a theme shared with the company, Hiden Intelligence, who face threats from the cyber-terrorist group, MetsubouJinrai.net, who want to take over and bring extinction to the human race via a tech uprising.

== Plot ==
The story takes place in a world where Japan has entered a new era of technological innovations as Hiden Intelligence, the leading tech company in artificial intelligence research, develops human-like androids called Humagears, which quickly become a staple in both public and private sectors. However, a cyber-terrorist organization known as "MetsubouJinrai.net" starts hacking into Humagears, transforming them into monsters called "Magias" and turning them against humanity. The government responds by establishing a military resistance unit Artificial Intelligence Military Service, or A.I.M.S., to destroy them.

The story primarily follows Aruto Hiden, a young man with aspirations of becoming a comedian who suddenly finds himself appointed as the new CEO of Hiden Intelligence after his grandfather's death. Despite his initial disinterest, Aruto changes his mind after witnessing MetsubouJinrai.net's terrorist attacks firsthand; maintaining appearances as CEO while becoming Kamen Rider Zero-One to realize his late father's wish for a peaceful co-existence between humans and humagears. This places him in an uneasy alliance with A.I.M.S. operatives, Isamu Fuwa and Yua Yaiba, who can transform into Kamen Rider Vulcan and Kamen Rider Valkyrie respectively, against MetsubouJinrai.net; led by the rogue Humagears Horobi and Jin, who can also transform into Kamen Riders.

All the while, Gai Amatsu, the CEO of tech giant conglomerate and Hiden's corporate rival ZAIA Enterprise, initially watches their battles from afar before moving forward with his agenda to destroy all Humagears and create a society only for humans with his company in the forefront. He later develops the Kamen Rider Thouser system to achieve his goals and personally enter the fray as well as devices to transform humans into “Raiders”. As the ideals of Aruto, Gai, and MetsubouJinrai.net collide, a three-way battle takes place to decide the future for both Humagears and humankind. However, after the maliciously sentient AI "Ark" ascends into a Kamen Rider form and threatens the world, they are forced to settle their differences and join forces to stop it.

== Production ==
Development for the show had begun during the summer of 2018. Producer Takahito Omori had visited several technological institutes and spoke with many professors and experts on the topic of artificial intelligence. The suit's design was completed in time before the Reiwa-era change, but a name had not been decided on yet. Omori came up with the idea of "Rei-One", which was a shortening of "Reiwa's first Rider." It was later pointed out that "rei" could also be read as "zero", and that there was already a superhero named Kikaider with the "01" moniker. With the show's heavy technology theme, the name "Zero-One" was chosen as a reference to binary code and the trademark was registered by Toei on April 19, 2019. Three months later, a press conference was announced by an unnamed Humagear on the Kamen Rider Zi-O Twitter account.

In July, Kamen Rider Zero-One was officially announced during a press conference alongside its cast. Yuya Takahashi is the main writer, who previously was main writer for Kamen Rider Ex-Aid, and later, for Kamen Rider Geats.

Two members of the band Monkey Majik revealed that they will be providing the voices for the Hiden Zero-One Driver and the Progrise Keys.

The theme song is "REAL×EYEZ", a collaboration by J×Takanori Nishikawa. J composed the song, while Nishikawa provides the vocals. Vocaloid producer DJ'Tekina//Something provided the song's arrangement.

=== Impact of the COVID-19 pandemic ===
As a result of the ongoing COVID-19 pandemic in Japan, the filming schedule changed and the series' television broadcast was delayed following episode 35. During the break period, Zero-One released five special episodes that reflect past events as recounted by the main characters. The two-part "President Special," focusing on Aruto Hiden and Is, the "Shooting Special," focusing on Isamu Fuwa and Yua Yaiba, and the two-part "Super Job War".

After Japan lifted the state of emergence on May 26, filming of Zero-One and other related Japanese dramas were allowed to resume filming starting on June 1. However, new restrictions were announced, such as filming staff maintaining a distance of at least two meters and only allowing 20 extras in a single scene while scenes with mass crowds will be handled with composite editing. In addition, Zero-One's broadcasting resumed on 21 June 2020. In regards to the summer movie, it was postponed alongside Mashin Sentai Kiramager the Movie: Be-Bop Dream due to the pandemic.

== Episodes ==
- The series is divided into four arcs:
  - Episode 1-16: The Secret Manuevering of MetsubouJinrai.net: This arc focuses on the threat of the cyber-terrorist group, MetsubouJinrai.net, who seek to bring extinction to the human race.
  - Episode 17-29: 5-Round Workplace Competition, ZAIA Enterprise: This arc focuses on Hiden Intelligence facing their corporate rival, ZAIA Enterprise, in a battle for technological supremacy.
  - Episode 30-35.5: Struggle! Hiden Manufacturing: This arc focuses on Aruto establishing a new company, Hiden Manufacturing, after ZAIA’s takeover of Hiden Intelligence and their continuous attempts to stop him as well as the resurgence of MetsubouJinrai.net.
  - Episode 36-45: Take Off Toward The Future! Hiden Intelligence: With MetsubouJinrai.net active again, their leader, the artificial intelligence Ark becomes Kamen Rider Ark-Zero to enslave humanity. In response, Aruto and his allies must join forces to stop it from achieving its goals. However, Aruto willingly becomes Kamen Rider Ark-One to avenge his friend, Is, who died at the hands of Horobi.

No.	Title	Directed by	Written by	Original release date
1	"I Am the President and a Kamen Rider"; Transliteration: "Ore ga Shachō de Kamen Raidā" (Japanese: オレが社長で仮面ライダー)	Teruaki Sugihara	Yuya Takahashi	September 1, 2019
2	"Are AI Guys Enemies? Allies?"; Transliteration: "Ē Ai na Aitsu wa Teki? Mikata?" (Japanese: AIなアイツは敵？味方？)	Teruaki Sugihara	Yuya Takahashi	September 8, 2019
3	"That Man Is a Sushi Chef"; Transliteration: "Sono Otoko, Sushi Shokunin" (Japanese: ソノ男、寿司職人)	Shojiro Nakazawa	Yuya Takahashi	September 15, 2019
4	"The Bus Guide Saw It! That Truth"; Transliteration: "Basu Gaido wa Mita! An'na Shinjitsu" (Japanese: バスガイドは見た！アンナ真実)	Shojiro Nakazawa	Yuya Takahashi	September 22, 2019
5	"His Passionate Path of Manga"; Transliteration: "Kare no Jōnetsu Manga-michi" (Japanese: カレの情熱まんが道)	Takayuki Shibasaki	Masaya Kakehi	September 29, 2019
6	"I Want to Hear Your Voice"; Transliteration: "Anata no Koe ga Kikitai" (Japanese: アナタの声が聞きたい)	Takayuki Shibasaki	Masaya Kakehi	October 6, 2019
7	"I Am a Hot-Blooded Humagear Teacher!"; Transliteration: "Watashi wa Nekketsu Hyūmagia Sensei!" (Japanese: ワタシは熱血ヒューマギア先生！)	Kyohei Yamaguchi	Masaya Kakehi	October 13, 2019
8	"The Destruction Begins Now"; Transliteration: "Koko kara ga Horobi no Hajimari" (Japanese: ココからが滅びの始まり)	Kyohei Yamaguchi	Yuya Takahashi	October 20, 2019
9	"Your Life Is In My Hands"; Transliteration: "Sono Inochi, Azukarimasu" (Japanese: ソノ生命、預かります)	Kyohei Yamaguchi	Yuya Takahashi	October 27, 2019
10	"I Am Shinya Owada, the Actor"; Transliteration: "Ore wa Haiyū, Ōwada Shin'ya" (Japanese: オレは俳優、大和田伸也)	Shojiro Nakazawa	Masaya Kakehi	November 10, 2019
11	"Keep the Camera Rolling, but Somebody Stop Him!"; Transliteration: "Kamera o Tomeru na, Aitsu o Tomero!" (Japanese: カメラを止めるな、アイツを止めろ！)	Shojiro Nakazawa	Masaya Kakehi	November 17, 2019
12	"That Ace Detective Arrives"; Transliteration: "Ano Meitantei ga Yattekita" (Japanese: アノ名探偵がやってきた)	Takayuki Shibasaki	Riku Sanjo	November 24, 2019
13	"Being the Presidential Aide Is My Job"; Transliteration: "Watashi no Shigoto wa Shachō Hisho" (Japanese: ワタシの仕事は社長秘書)	Takayuki Shibasaki	Riku Sanjo	December 1, 2019
14	"We Are the Astronaut Brothers!"; Transliteration: "Ore-tachi Uchū Hikōshi Burazāzu!" (Japanese: オレたち宇宙飛行士ブラザーズ！)	Satoshi Morota	Yuya Takahashi	December 8, 2019
15	"Each One's Ending"; Transliteration: "Sorezore no Owari" (Japanese: ソレゾレの終わり)	Satoshi Morota	Yuya Takahashi	December 15, 2019
16	"This Is the Dawn of ZAIA"; Transliteration: "Kore ga Zaia no Yoake" (Japanese: コレがZAIA(ザイア)の夜明け)	Shojiro Nakazawa	Yuya Takahashi	December 22, 2019
17	"For I Am a President and a Kamen Rider"; Transliteration: "Watashi koso ga Shachō de Kamen Raidā" (Japanese: ワタシこそが社長で仮面ライダー)	Shojiro Nakazawa	Yuya Takahashi	January 5, 2020
18	"This Is How I Arrange My Flowers"; Transliteration: "Kore ga Watashi no Ikeru Hana" (Japanese: コレがワタシのいける華)	Shojiro Nakazawa	Yuya Takahashi	January 12, 2020
19	"She Is a Humagear Who Sells Houses"; Transliteration: "Kanojo wa Ie Uru Hyūmagia" (Japanese: カノジョは家売るヒューマギア)	Hidenori Ishida	Yuya Takahashi	January 19, 2020
20	"That Is 1000% the Best House"; Transliteration: "Sore ga Sen-pāsento no Besuto Hausu" (Japanese: ソレが1000％のベストハウス)	Hidenori Ishida	Yuya Takahashi	January 26, 2020
21	"Objection! That Trial"; Transliteration: "Igi Ari! Sono Saiban" (Japanese: 異議あり！ソノ裁判)	Teruaki Sugihara	Yuya Takahashi	February 2, 2020
22	"Even So, He Didn't Do It"; Transliteration: "Sore demo Kare wa Yattenai" (Japanese: ソレでもカレはやってない)	Teruaki Sugihara	Yuya Takahashi	February 9, 2020
23	"I Am in Love With Your Intelligence!"; Transliteration: "Kimi no Chinō ni Koi Shiteru!" (Japanese: キミの知能に恋してる！)	Satoshi Morota	Minato Takano	February 16, 2020
24	"It Is Our Turn"; Transliteration: "Watashi-tachi no Ban desu" (Japanese: ワタシたちの番です)	Satoshi Morota	Minato Takano	February 23, 2020
25	"I Will Save the Humagears"; Transliteration: "Boku ga Hyūmagia o Sukuu" (Japanese: ボクがヒューマギアを救う)	Kazuya Kamihoriuchi	Yuya Takahashi	March 1, 2020
26	"We Are the Flaming Fire Brigade"; Transliteration: "Ware-ra Honō no Shōbōtai" (Japanese: ワレら炎の消防隊)	Kazuya Kamihoriuchi	Yuya Takahashi	March 8, 2020
27	"I Will Not Give Up on a Life"; Transliteration: "Boku wa Inochi o Akiramenai" (Japanese: ボクは命を諦めない)	Kazuya Kamihoriuchi	Yuya Takahashi	March 15, 2020
28	"My Rap Will Change the World!"; Transliteration: "Ore no Rappu ga Sekai o Kaeru!" (Japanese: オレのラップが世界を変える！)	Teruaki Sugihara	Yuya Takahashi	March 22, 2020
29	"Our Dreams Will Not Be Broken"; Transliteration: "Ore-tachi no Yume wa Kowarenai" (Japanese: オレたちの夢は壊れない)	Teruaki Sugihara	Yuya Takahashi	March 29, 2020
30	"After All, I Am the President and a Kamen Rider"; Transliteration: "Yappari Ore ga Shachō de Kamen Raidā" (Japanese: やっぱりオレが社長で仮面ライダー)	Takayuki Shibasaki	Yuya Takahashi	April 5, 2020
31	"Take Off Toward Your Dream!"; Transliteration: "Kimi no Yume ni Mukatte Tobe!" (Japanese: キミの夢に向かって飛べ！)	Takayuki Shibasaki	Yuya Takahashi	April 12, 2020
32	"My Pride! The Runway of Dreams"; Transliteration: "Watashi no Puraido! Yume no Ranwei" (Japanese: ワタシのプライド！夢のランウェイ)	Ryuta Tasaki	Masaya Kakehi	April 19, 2020
33	"Are Dreams Really That Important?"; Transliteration: "Yume ga Son'na ni Daiji nano ka?" (Japanese: 夢がソンナに大事なのか？)	Ryuta Tasaki	Masaya Kakehi	April 26, 2020
34	"This Is Horobi's Way of Life"; Transliteration: "Kore ga Horobi no Ikiru Michi" (Japanese: コレが滅の生きる道)	Shojiro Nakazawa	Masaya Kakehi	May 3, 2020
35	"What Do Humagears Dream of?" Transliteration: "Hyūmagia wa Don'na Yume o Miru ka?" (Japanese: ヒューマギアはドンナ夢を見るか？)	Shojiro Nakazawa	Masaya Kakehi	May 10, 2020
SP–1	"President Special: Part.01"; Transliteration: "Purejidento Supesharu Pāto Wan" (Japanese: プレジデント・スペシャル PART.01)	N/A	Masaya Kakehi	May 17, 2020
SP–2	"President Special: Part.02"; Transliteration: "Purejidento Supesharu Pāto Tsū" (Japanese: プレジデント・スペシャル PART.02)	N/A	Masaya Kakehi	May 24, 2020
SP–3	"Shooting Special"; Transliteration: "Shūtingu Supesharu" (Japanese: シューティング・スペシャル)	N/A	N/A	May 31, 2020
SP–4	"Super Job War: Battle 1"; Transliteration: "Sūpā Oshigoto Taisen Batoru Wan" (Japanese: 超(スーパー)お仕事大戦 バトル1)	N/A	N/A	June 7, 2020
SP–5	"Super Job War: Battle 2"; Transliteration: "Sūpā Oshigoto Taisen Batoru Tsū" (Japanese: 超(スーパー)お仕事大戦 バトル2)	N/A	N/A	June 14, 2020
35.5	"What Created MetsubouJinrai?"; Transliteration: "Nani ga Metsubōjinrai o Tsukutta no ka?" (Japanese: ナニが滅亡迅雷を創ったのか？)	Masaya Kakehi	Yuya Takahashi	June 21, 2020
36	"I Am the Ark and a Kamen Rider"; Transliteration: "Watashi ga Āku de Kamen Raidā" (Japanese: ワタシがアークで仮面ライダー)	Takayuki Shibasaki	Masaya Kakehi	June 28, 2020
37	"No One Can Stop It"; Transliteration: "Sore wa Dare ni mo Tomerarenai" (Japanese: ソレはダレにも止められない)	Takayuki Shibasaki	Masaya Kakehi	July 5, 2020
38	"I Am 1000% Your Friend"; Transliteration: "Boku wa Sen-pāsento Kimi no Tomodachi" (Japanese: ボクは1000％キミの友だち)	Ryosuke Sakuno	Yuya Takahashi	July 12, 2020
39	"That Conclusion Is Unpredictable"; Transliteration: "Sono Ketsuron, Yosoku Funō" (Japanese: ソノ結論、予測不能)	Ryosuke Sakuno	Yuya Takahashi	July 19, 2020
40	"Toward Our Dream"; Transliteration: "Ore to Watashi no Yume ni Mukatte" (Japanese: オレとワタシの夢に向かって)	Shojiro Nakazawa	Yuya Takahashi	July 26, 2020
41	"Thou, Take Thy Neighbor's Hand!"; Transliteration: "Nanji, Rinjin to Te o Tore!" (Japanese: ナンジ、隣人と手をとれ！)	Shojiro Nakazawa	Yuya Takahashi	August 2, 2020
42	"As Long as There Is Malice"; Transliteration: "Soko ni Akui ga Aru Kagiri" (Japanese: ソコに悪意がある限り)	Ryuta Tasaki	Yuya Takahashi	August 9, 2020
43	"That Is a Heart"; Transliteration: "Sore ga Kokoro" (Japanese: ソレが心)	Ryuta Tasaki	Yuya Takahashi	August 16, 2020
44	"There Is Only One Person Who Can Stop You"; Transliteration: "Omae o Tomerareru no wa Tada Hitori" (Japanese: オマエを止められるのはただひとり)	Teruaki Sugihara	Yuya Takahashi	August 23, 2020
45 (Finale)	"The Future of Each"; Transliteration: "Sorezore no Miraizu" (Japanese: ソレゾレの未来図)	Teruaki Sugihara	Yuya Takahashi	August 30, 2020

== Films ==
Kamen Rider Zero-One made his first appearance as a cameo in the film Kamen Rider Zi-O the Movie: Over Quartzer.

=== Reiwa The First Generation ===
A Movie War film, titled Kamen Rider Reiwa The First Generation (仮面ライダー 令和 ザ・ファースト・ジェネレーション, Kamen Raidā Reiwa Za Fāsuto Jenerēshon) was released on December 21, 2019, featuring the casts of Kamen Rider Zero-One and the last Heisei Kamen Rider series, Kamen Rider Zi-O. Actress Rina Ikoma and actor Sōkō Wada portrayed the Time Jacker Finis and the Humagear Will respectively. This movie introduces another version of Kamen Rider Zero-One known as Kamen Rider Zerozero-One, and the Kamen Rider 1-inspired Kamen Rider Ichi-Gata. This movie is a shared tribute to the original series, Kamen Rider, and the entire Heisei Kamen Rider Series as a whole. The events of the film take place between episodes 9 and 10.

=== Real×Time ===
Kamen Rider Zero-One the Movie: Real×Time (劇場版 仮面ライダーゼロワン REAL×TIME, Gekijōban Kamen Raidā Zero Wan Riaru Taimu) was originally scheduled for release on July 23, 2020, double billed with Mashin Sentai Kiramager's film, but both were postponed due to the COVID-19 pandemic. On August 30, 2020, the film was given a new release date of December 18, 2020. On October 18, 2020, it was announced that the film will be double billed with Kamen Rider Saber Theatrical Short Story: The Phoenix Swordsman and the Book of Ruin. In the film, which is set after the final episode of the TV series, actor Hideaki Itō portrayed the film's main antagonist.

== Special episodes ==
- Kamen Rider Zero-One: What Will Pop Out of the Kangaroo? Think About It by Yourself! Yes! It Must Be Me, Aruto!! (仮面ライダーゼロワン カンガルーからナニ飛び出す？ソンナの自分でカンガルー！はい、或人じゃないと!!, Kamen Raidā Zero Wan Kangarū kara Nani Tobidasu? Son'na no Jibun de Kangarū! Hai, Aruto ja Nai to!!) is Televi-Kun's "Hyper Battle DVD" (超(ハイパー)バトルDVD, Haipā Batoru Dī Bui Dī). This events of this special take place between episodes 13 and 14.
- A Miraculous Transformation!? Aruto vs. Fukkinhoukai Taro: The Fateful Gag Battle! (奇跡の転身!?アルトVS.腹筋崩壊太郎 宿命のギャグバトル！, Kiseki no Tenshin!? Aruto Tai Fukkinhōkai Tarō Shukumei no Gyagu Batoru!) is a web-exclusive series released on Toei's official YouTube channel.
- Project Thouser (プロジェクト・サウザー, Purojekuto Sauzā) is included as part of the Blu-ray releases of Kamen Rider Zero-One. This side story comprises two episodes and focuses on Gai Amatsu. The events of this miniseries take place before episode 17.
- President Special (プレジデント・スペシャル, Purejidento Supesharu) is a special two-part recap miniseries told from the perspective of Aruto Hiden and Is.
- Shooting Special (シューティング・スペシャル, Shūtingu Supesharu) is a special recap episode told from the perspective of Isamu Fuwa and Yua Yaiba.
- Super Job War (超（スーパー）お仕事大戦, Sūpā Oshigoto Taisen) is a special two-part episode covering the jobs the cast has seen performed during the series.

== Zero-One Others ==
Zero-One Others (ゼロワン Others, Zero Wan Azāzu) is a series of V-Cinema releases written by Yuya Takahashi and directed by Masaya Kakehi that serve as spin-offs for characters from the Kamen Rider Zero-One series. The events of the V-Cinemas take place after the end of the main series and Kamen Rider Zero-One the Movie: Real×Time.

- Kamen Rider MetsubouJinrai (仮面ライダー滅亡迅雷, Kamen Raidā Metsubōjinrai) is a side story that focuses on MetsubouJinrai.net members Horobi, Jin, Ikazuchi, and Naki. Actor Jai West portrayed the film's main antagonist, Lyon Arkland. The V-Cinema received a limited theatrical release on March 26, 2021, followed by its DVD and Blu-ray release on July 14, 2021. The theme song is "S.O.S" performed by Monkey Majik.
- Kamen Rider Vulcan & Valkyrie (仮面ライダーバルカン&バルキリー, Kamen Raidā Barukan And Barukirī) is a side story that focuses on Isamu Fuwa and Yua Yaiba. The V-Cinema received a limited theatrical release on August 27, 2021, followed by its DVD and Blu-ray release on November 10, 2021. The theme song is "Frontier" performed by Monkey Majik.

== Everyone's Daily Life ==
Kamen Rider Zero-One Short Anime: Everyone's Daily Life (仮面ライダーゼロワン ショートアニメ EVERYONE'S DAILY LIFE, Kamen Raiā Zero Wan Shōto Anime Eburiwanzu Deirī Raifu) is a web-exclusive animated short series released on Toei Tokusatsu Fan Club on July 23, 2020.

1. Is Gives Him a Tour of Hiden (イズ、カレに飛電紹介するってよ, Izu, Kare ni Hiden Shōkai Surutte yo)
2. Fuwa and Yaiba Get Excited About That (不破と刃、アレでドキドキ, Fuwa to Yaiba, Are de Dokidoki)
3. Their Secret Game (カレらのヒミツのゲーム, Karera no Himitsu no Gēmu)
4. What Does He Do After That? (アイツ、アノ後ナニしてる？, Aitsu, Ano Ato Nani Shiteru?)
5. This Is My Dream (コレがオレの夢, Kore ga Ore no Yume)

== Kamen Rider Genms ==
Kamen Rider Genms (仮面ライダーゲンムズ, Kamen Raidā Genmuzu) is a web-exclusive crossover series of Toei Tokusatsu Fan Club starring Nachi Sakuragi as Gai Amatsu and Tetsuya Iwanaga of Kamen Rider Ex-Aid reprising his role as Kuroto Dan. The theme song is "GAME CHANGER" performed by Hiroyuki Takami, who reprised his role as Masamune Dan in the first entry.

- The Presidents (ザ・プレジデンツ, Za Purejidentsu) is the first entry of the web-exclusive series released on April 11, 2021 that comprises two episodes. The events of the series take place after Zero-One Others: Kamen Rider Vulcan & Valkyrie.
- Smart Brain and the 1000% Crisis (スマートブレインと1000%のクライシス, Sumāto Burein to Sen-pāsento no Kuraishisu) is a sequel to the first entry of the web-exclusive series released on April 17, 2022. This entry features an appearance by Smart Brain from Kamen Rider 555.

== Kamen Rider Outsiders ==
Kamen Rider Outsiders (仮面ライダーアウトサイダーズ, Kamen Raidā Autosaidāzu) is a web-exclusive crossover series released on Toei Tokusatsu Fan Club on October 16, 2022 that features cast members from the Kamen Rider metaseries and serves as a direct sequel to Kamen Rider Genms. The theme song is "What's the Outsiders?" performed by m.c.A.T.

== Video game ==
Kamen Rider: Memory of Heroez is a 3D action game released on October 29, 2020 for PlayStation 4 and Nintendo Switch. While the storyline primarily focuses on the casts of Kamen Rider W and Kamen Rider OOO, the titular Rider of Kamen Rider Zero-One also appears in the game.

== Comics ==
- An American comic book series of the same name, written by Brian Easton and drawn by Hendry Prasetya, was announced by Titan Comics on April 28, 2022. The first issue was released on November 23, 2022. A new foe (known as Kamen Rider Ragnarok) was introduced in the first issue.
- During Batman Day 2026, a comic book crossover between Batman and Zero-One was announced to be written by Kenny Porter and drawn by Tokitokoro and released by DC Comics.

== Cast ==
- Aruto Hiden (飛電 或人, Hiden Aruto): Fumiya Takahashi (高橋 文哉, Takahashi Fumiya)
- Isamu Fuwa (不破 諫, Fuwa Isamu): Ryutaro Okada (岡田 龍太郎, Okada Ryūtarō)
- Is (イズ, Izu), As (アズ, Azu): Noa Tsurushima (鶴嶋 乃愛, Tsurushima Noa)
- Yua Yaiba (刃 唯阿, Yaiba Yua): Hiroe Igeta (井桁 弘恵, Igeta Hiroe)
- Jin (迅): Daisuke Nakagawa (中川 大輔, Nakagawa Daisuke)
- Horobi (滅): Syuya Sunagawa (砂川 脩弥, Sunagawa Shūya)
- Gai Amatsu (天津 垓, Amatsu Gai): Nachi Sakuragi (桜木 那智, Sakuragi Nachi)
- Ikazuchi (雷): Daichi Yamaguchi (山口 大地, Yamaguchi Daichi)
- Naki (亡): Satsuki Nakayama (中山 咲月, Nakayama Satsuki)
- Shesta (シェスタ, Shesuta): Asumi Narita (成田 愛純, Narita Asumi)
- Sanzō Yamashita (山下 三造, Yamashita Sanzō): Arata Saeki (佐伯 新, Saeki Arata)
- Assassin Humagear (暗殺ヒューマギア, Ansatsu Hyūmagia), Matsurida Z (祭田 ゼット, Matsurida Zetto): Ryunosuke Matsumura (松村 龍之介, Matsumura Ryūnosuke)
- Soreo Hiden (飛電 其雄, Hiden Soreo): Koji Yamamoto (山本 耕史, Yamamoto Kōji)
- Jun Fukuzoe (福添 准, Fukuzoe Jun): Kazuya Kojima (児嶋 一哉, Kojima Kazuya)
- Korenosuke Hiden (飛電 是之助, Hiden Korenosuke): Tokuma Nishioka (西岡 德馬, Nishioka Tokuma)

=== Voice cast ===
- Ark (アーク, Āku), Ark Driver (アークドライバー, Āku Doraibā): Show Hayami (速水 奨, Hayami Shō)
- That (ザット, Zatto): Noriko Hidaka (日髙 のり子, Hidaka Noriko)
- Progrise Keys (プログライズキー, Puroguraizu Kī), Zetsumerise Keys (ゼツメライズキー, Zetsumeraizu Kī): Maynard Plant, Blaise Plant
- Kamen Rider Thouser Equipment: Mark Weitzman
- Narrator: Kōichi Yamadera (山寺 宏一, Yamadera Kōichi)

=== Guest cast ===
- Fukkinhoukai Taro (腹筋崩壊 太郎, Fukkinhōkai Tarō; 1): Nakayama Kinnikun (なかやまきんに君)
- Mitsukuni Nezu (根津 光国, Nezu Mitsukuni; 1): Akio Kaneda (金田 明夫, Kaneda Akio)
- Young Isamu Fuwa (2): Soshi Hagiwara (萩原 壮志, Hagiwara Sōshi).
- Norio Uozumi (魚住 範雄, Uozumi Norio; 3): Tetsu Watanabe (渡辺 哲, Watanabe Tetsu)
- Ikkan Nigiro (一貫 ニギロー, Ikkan Nigirō; 3, 24): Kenta Uchino (内野 謙太, Uchino Kenta)
- Chōichirō Ishizumi (石墨 超一郎, Ishizumi Chōichirō; 5, 31): Katsuya (勝矢)
- Kanasawa Seine (香菜澤 セイネ; 5–6): Karen Miyama (美山 加恋, Miyama Karen)
- Seiji Tazawa (多澤 青次, Tazawa Seiji; 5–6): Hajime Okayama (おかやま はじめ, Okayama Hajime)
- Mashirochan (ましろちゃん, Mashirochan; 8): Suzuka Ohgo (大後 寿々花, Ōgo Suzuka)
- Himself (10–11): Shinya Owada (大和田 伸也, Ōwada Shin'ya)
- Matsuda Enji (松田 エンジ, Matsuda Enji; 10–11, 23–24): Hiromi Sakimoto (崎本 大海, Sakimoto Hiromi)
- Saikyo Takumi Oyakata (最強 匠親方, Saikyō Takumi Oyakata; 19–20, 24, 41): Hidekazu Nagae (長江 英和, Nagae Hidekazu)
- Ginnojō Ōshiro (大城 銀之丞, Ōshiro Gin'nojō; 20): Hirohisa Nakata (中田 博久, Nakata Hirohisa)
- Bengoshi Bingo (弁護士ビンゴ; 21–22, 24): Keisuke Minami (南 圭介, Minami Keisuke)
- Chiharu Ebii (海老井 千春, Ebii Chiharu; 21–24): Arisa Komiya (小宮 有紗, Komiya Arisa)
- Enmusubi Match (縁結び マッチ, Enmusubi Matchi; 23–24): Ryōma Baba (馬場 良馬, Baba Ryōma)
- Love-chan (ラブチャン, Rabuchan; 32): So Kaku (佳久 創, Kaku Sō)
- Ikkei Amatsu (天津 一京, Amatsu Ikkei; 38): Kosei Kato (加藤 厚成, Katō Kōsei)
- Williamson Yotagaki (与多垣 ウィリアムソン, Yotagaki Wiriamuson; 42–44): Tomomi Maruyama (丸山 智己, Maruyama Tomomi)
- S (エス, Esu; 45): Hideaki Itō (伊藤 英明, Itō Hideaki)

== Theme songs ==
Opening theme

- "REAL×EYEZ"
  - Lyrics: Shoko Fujibayashi, Takanori Nishikawa
  - Composition: J
  - Arrangement: J×Takanori Nishikawa, DJ'Tekina//Something
  - Artist: J×Takanori Nishikawa
  Episodes 1–2, 29, 45, and Specials 1-3 do not feature the show's opening sequence. This song is used as the ending theme in episodes 2 and 45 and as an insert song in episodes 1, 9, 29, 38–39, and Specials 1-3.

== International releases ==
- Shout! Factory released the complete series and Kamen Rider Zero-One The Movie: Real×Time on Blu-ray and digital on January 22, 2022, in North America.
- In the Philippines, Kamen Rider Zero-One was aired on GMA Network's Astig Authority weekend morning block dubbed in Filipino beginning on February 18, 2023 every Saturdays and later weekends until October 8, 2023. Re-runs aired on that network until April 2024 and on GTV's Kiddie Authority every Sunday from August to September of that year and again on October 26 every Sunday at 11:00 am.
