= List of Kishiryu Sentai Ryusoulger characters =

Kishiryu Sentai Ryusoulger (騎士竜戦隊リュウソウジャー, Kishiryū Sentai Ryūsōjā) is a Japanese tokusatsu series that serves as the 43rd installment in the Super Sentai franchise, and the 31st and final entry in the Heisei era. The series follows the knights of the Ryusoul Tribe as they fight against the Druidon Tribe, a powerful race of monsters who once ruled Earth before fleeing into space 65 million years ago before returning to reclaim it.

== Main characters ==
=== Ryusoulgers ===
The eponymous Ryusoulgers are members of the Ryusoul Tribe (リュウソウ族, Ryūsō-zoku), an ancient race that has existed since the age of the dinosaurs who were originally warlike in the past. The Ryusoul Tribe made their home in an isolated mountain village in Aokigahara where they pass the Ryusoulger mantle from master to apprentice while safeguarding the temple holding the Kishiryu. When the Druidon Tribe return to Earth, the current Ryusoulgers are forced to leave their home.

Each primary member carries a Ryusoul Changer (リュウソウチェンジャー, Ryūsō Chenjā) bracelet, which allows them to summon their Kishiryu, as their transformation device along with a Ryusoul Ken (リュウソウケン, Ryūsō Ken; Ryusoul Sword), which allows them to either access special abilities via the auxiliary RyuSouls or perform the Dino Slash (ディーノスラッシュ, Dīno Surasshu) finisher via their personal RyuSouls, as their sidearm.

After acquiring the Ryusoul Calibur (リュウソウカリバー, Ryūsō Karibā), a legendary sword that previously served to maintain the seal on Eras, any one of the Ryusoulgers can utilize it to assume a caped Noblesse Mode (ノブレスモード, Noburesu Mōdo) form. Their finishers in this form are the Extreme Dino Slash (エクストリームディーノスラッシュ, Ekusutorīmu Dīno Surasshu) via their personal Ryusouls and the Ultimate Dino Slash (アルティメットディーノスラッシュ, Arutimetto Dīno Surasshu) via the KyoRyuSouls.

==== Koh ====
Koh (コウ, Kō) is the 209-year-old energetic and curious squire of the late Master Red who becomes the current "Brave Knight" (勇猛の騎士, Yūmō no Kishi), Ryusoul Red (リュウソウレッド, Ryūsō Reddo). A kind-hearted, talented, yet childish swordsman, Koh can sometimes let his personality get the better of him and unintentionally cause problems.

Later in the series, Koh acquires the Max Ryusoul Changer (マックスリュウソウチェンジャー, Makkusu Ryūsō Chenjā) claw, which allows him to transform into the armored Max Ryusoul Red (マックスリュウソウレッド, Makkusu Ryūsō Reddo). While transformed, he gains the ability to combine the power of two RyuSouls for special attacks. His finishers in this form are the Everlasting Claw (エバーラスティングクロー, Ebārasutingu Kurō) via the Max Ryusoul Changer and the Everlasting Dino Slash (エバーラスティングディーノスラッシュ, Ebārasutingu Dīno Surasshu) via the Ryusoul Ken and Max Ryusoul Changer.

Koh is portrayed by Hayate Ichinose (一ノ瀬 颯, Ichinose Hayate). As a child, Koh is portrayed by Sakutarō Kojima (小嶋 朔太郎, Kojima Sakutarō).

==== Melto ====
Melto (メルト, Meruto) is Koh's composed and studious childhood friend with blue hair and the squire of the late Master Blue who becomes the current "Wise Knight" (叡智の騎士, Eichi no Kishi), Ryusoul Blue (リュウソウブルー, Ryūsō Burū). An honored, intelligent knight, he knows everything about the Kishiryu and the Minosaurs. However, he can be too objective in his approach and come off as insensitive to others' feelings, such as seeing the Kishiryu as "weapons" instead of partners. Despite this, he is friendly at heart and ultimately means well.

Melto is portrayed by Keito Tsuna (綱 啓永, Tsuna Keito). As a child, Melto is portrayed by Takuya Kawajiri (川尻 拓弥, Kawajiri Takuya).

==== Asuna ====
Asuna (アスナ) is Koh's honest childhood friend with superhuman strength born from a noble family and the squire of the late Master Pink who becomes the current "Vigorous Knight" (剛健の騎士, Gōken no Kishi), Ryusoul Pink (リュウソウピンク, Ryūsō Pinku). Despite her incredible strength, she can be rather clumsy and gluttonous at times, though she also displays a considerable amount of luck. Out of everyone on the team, she has the closet bond to Ui, in part because they have both lost a loved one.

Asuna is portrayed by Ichika Osaki (尾碕 真花, Osaki Ichika). As a child, Asuna is portrayed by Ena Fujimoto (藤本 江奈, Fujimoto Ena).

==== Towa ====
Towa (トワ) is a confident and competitive knight who is Bamba's younger brother and the current "Gale Knight" (疾風の騎士, Shippū no Kishi), Ryusoul Green (リュウソウグリーン, Ryūsō Gurīn).

Towa is portrayed by Yuito Obara (小原 唯和, Obara Yuito).

==== Bamba ====
Bamba (バンバ, Banba) is a quiet and unfriendly knight with master-level combat skills who is Towa's older brother and the current "Regal Knight" (威風の騎士, Ifū no Kishi), Ryusoul Black (リュウソウブラック, Ryūsō Burakku).

Bamba is portrayed by Tatsuya Kishida (岸田 タツヤ, Kishida Tatsuya). As a teenager, Bamba is portrayed by Ryuto Kawashima (川嶋 龍登, Kawashima Ryūto).

==== Canalo ====
Canalo (カナロ, Kanaro) is a descendant of the Sea Ryusoul Tribe (海のリュウソウ族, Umi no Ryūsō-zoku), a splinter faction of the Ryusoul Tribe that wanted nothing to do with the main branch and took refuge under the sea during the ancient conflict with the Druidon Tribe. Due to his tribe being few in number, Canalo came ashore to find a wife, but ends up joining forces with the Ryusoulgers after he realizes they are nothing like their ancestors.

Unlike the primary Ryusoulgers, Canalo utilizes the Mosa Changer (モサチェンジャー, Mosa Chenjā) firearm to transform into the "Glorious Knight" (栄光の騎士, Eikō no Kishi), Ryusoul Gold (リュウソウゴールド, Ryūsō Gōrudo). He also wields the Mosa Blade (モサブレード, Mosa Burēdo) dagger, which similar to the Ryusoul Ken can be used to either access special abilities via the auxiliary RyuSouls or perform the Mosa Dino Slash (モサディーノスラッシュ, Mosa Dīno Surasshu) finisher via the Gold RyuSoul. While using a KyoRyuSoul, he can combine the Mosa Changer and Blade to form the Mosa Breaker (モサブレイカー, Mosa Bureikā) bayonet, which allows him to perform varying Final Shot (ファイナルショット, Fainaru Shotto) finishers.

Canalo is portrayed by Katsumi Hyodo (兵頭 功海, Hyōdō Katsumi).

=== RyuSouls ===
The RyuSouls (リュウソウル, Ryūsōru) are key-like relics that hold the spirits of the Kishiryu and give the Ryusoulgers their powers. They can also change from Soul Mode (ソウルモード, Sōru Mōdo) to Knight Mode (ナイトモード, Naito Mōdo). When not in use, every auxiliary RyuSoul takes the form of a Blank Soul (ブランクソウル, Buranku Sōru). Setting a personal RyuSoul into a Ryusoul Changer and/or the Mosa Changer allows the user to transform while setting one into a Ryusoul Ken and/or the Mosa Blade allows them to perform a finisher. While using an auxiliary RyuSoul, the primary Ryusoulgers form a unique Ryusoul Armor (リュウソウアーマー, Ryūsō Āmā) on their right arm via 'Saur Armament (竜装, Ryūsō). An amber-based RyuSoul is called a Beginning RyuSoul (始まりのリュウソウル, Hajimari no Ryūsōru).

==== Change ====
- Red RyuSoul (レッドリュウソウル, Reddo Ryūsōru): Koh's personal RyuSoul that holds the spirit of Kishiryu Tyramigo and allows him to transform into Ryusoul Red.
- Blue RyuSoul (ブルーリュウソウル, Burū Ryūsōru): Melto's personal RyuSoul that holds the spirit of Kishiryu Triken and allows him to transform into Ryusoul Blue.
- Pink RyuSoul (ピンクリュウソウル, Pinku Ryūsōru): Asuna's personal RyuSoul that holds the spirit of Kishiryu Ankyloze and allows her to transform into Ryusoul Pink.
- Green RyuSoul (グリーンリュウソウル, Gurīn Ryūsōru): Towa's personal RyuSoul that holds the spirit of Kishiryu TigerLance and allows him to transform into Ryusoul Green.
- Black RyuSoul (ブラックリュウソウル, Burakku Ryūsōru): Bamba's personal RyuSoul that holds the spirit of Kishiryu MilNeedle and allows him to transform into Ryusoul Black.
- Gold RyuSoul (ゴールドリュウソウル, Gōrudo Ryūsōru): Canalo's personal RyuSoul that holds the spirit of Kishiryu MosaRex and allows him to transform into Ryusoul Gold.
- GaiSoul (ガイソウル, Gaisōru): Nada's personal RyuSoul that allows him to don the Gaisoulg armor.
- Max RyuSoul (マックスリュウソウル, Makkusu Ryūsōru): Koh's secondary RyuSoul that allows him to transform into Max Ryusoul Red.

==== Auxiliary ====
- TsuyoSoul (ツヨソウル, Tsuyosōru; Power Soul): A Rauisuchus-based RyuSoul that holds the spirit of Kishiryu Tsuyosouryu (ツヨソウリュウ, Tsuyosōryū) and grants increased attack power. This RyuSoul first appears in the miniseries Super Sentai Strongest Battle.
- NobiSoul (ノビソウル, Nobisōru; Stretch Soul): A Lambeosaurus-based RyuSoul that holds the spirit of Kishiryu Nobisouryu (ノビソウリュウ, Nobisōryū) and grants the ability to stretch any object. This RyuSoul first appears in the miniseries Super Sentai Strongest Battle.
- OmoSoul (オモソウル, Omosōru; Heavy Soul): A Brachiosaurus-based RyuSoul that holds the spirit of Kishiryu Omosouryu (オモソウリュウ, Omosōryū) and grants gyrokinesis.
- KikeSoul (キケソウル, Kikesōru; Hear Soul): An Allosaurus-based RyuSoul that holds the spirit of Kishiryu Kikesouryu (キケソウリュウ, Kikesōryū) and grants an enhanced sense of hearing.
- KusaSoul (クサソウル, Kusasōru; Stink Soul): A Quetzalcoatlus-based RyuSoul that holds the spirit of Kishiryu Kusasouryu (クサソウリュウ, Kusasōryū) and grants the ability to produce a stinky gas.
- MieSoul (ミエソウル, Miesōru; See Soul): An Iguanodon-based RyuSoul that holds the spirit of Kishiryu Miesouryu (ミエソウリュウ, Miesōryū) and grants enhanced eyesight.
- MukimukiSoul (ムキムキソウル, Mukimukisōru; Strength Soul): A Therizinosaurus-based RyuSoul that holds the spirit of Kishiryu Mukimukisouryu (ムキムキソウリュウ, Mukimukisōryū) and grants superhuman strength.
- ChiisaSoul (チーサソウル, Chīsasōru; Shrink Soul): A Mapusaurus-based RyuSoul that holds the spirit of Kishiryu Chiisasouryu (チーサソウリュウ, Chīsasōryū) and grants the ability to shrink anyone or anything down to smaller sizes.
- MabushiSoul (マブシソウル, Mabushisōru; Glare Soul): A Deinonychus-based RyuSoul that holds the spirit of Kishiryu Mabushisouryu (マブシソウリュウ, Mabushisōryū) and grants the ability to produce a powerful flash of light.
- HayaSoul (ハヤソウル, Hayasōru; Fast Soul): A Microraptor-based RyuSoul that holds the spirit of Kishiryu Hayasouryu (ハヤソウリュウ, Hayasōryū) and grants superhuman speed. This RyuSoul first appears in the miniseries Super Sentai Strongest Battle.
- KataSoul (カタソウル, Katasōru; Hard Soul): An Archelon-based RyuSoul that holds the spirit of Kishiryu Katasouryu (カタソウリュウ, Katasōryū) and grants invulnerability to any attack.
- MistSoul (ミストソウル, Misutosōru): A Protoceratops-based RyuSoul that holds the spirit of Kishiryu Mistsouryu (ミストソウリュウ, Misutosōryū) and grants the ability to produce mist.
- KaruSoul (カルソウル, Karusōru; Light Soul): An Archaeopteryx-based RyuSoul that holds the spirit of Kishiryu Karusouryu (カルソウリュウ, Karusōryū) and grants the ability to make anyone or anything lighter in weight.
- GyakuSoul (ギャクソウル, Gyakusōru; Reverse Soul): A Parasaurolophus-based RyuSoul that holds the spirit of Kishiryu Gyakusouryu (ギャクソウリュウ, Gyakusōryū) and grants the ability to turn anything back to its original state.
- KotaeSoul (コタエソウル, Kotaesōru; Answer Soul): An Edmontosaurus-based RyuSoul that holds the spirit of Kishiryu Kotaesouryu (コタエソウリュウ, Kotaesōryū) and grants the ability to put someone into a sleep-like trance that causes them to only tell the truth.
- MigakeSoul (ミガケソウル, Migakesōru; Polish Soul): A Pachycephalosaurus-based RyuSoul that holds the spirit of Kishiryu Migakesouryu (ミガケソウリュウ, Migakesōryū) and grants the ability to make anyone or anything slippery.
- KunkunSoul (クンクンソウル, Kunkunsōru; Smell Soul): A Maiasaura-based RyuSoul that holds the spirit of Kishiryu Kunkunsouryu (クンクンソウリュウ, Kunkunsōryū) and grants an enhanced sense of smell.
- PukupukuSoul (プクプクソウル, Pukupukusōru; Inflation Soul): An Altirhinus-based RyuSoul that holds the spirit of Kishiryu Pukupukusouryu (プクプクソウリュウ, Pukupukusōryū) and grants the ability to inflate anyone or anything like a balloon.
- KakureSoul (カクレソウル, Kakuresōru; Hiding Soul): A Megalosaurus-based RyuSoul that holds the spirit of Kishiryu Kakuresouryu (カクレソウリュウ, Kakuresōryū) and grants the ability to make anyone or anything invisible.
- FueSoul (フエソウル, Fuesōru; Double Soul): A Troodon-based RyuSoul that holds the spirit of Kishiryu Fuesouryu (フエソウリュウ, Fuesōryū) and grants the ability to create a duplicate of anyone or anything.
- MawariSoul (マワリソウル, Mawarisōru; Spin Soul): A Utahraptor-based RyuSoul that holds the spirit of Kishiryu Mawarisouryu (マワリソウリュウ, Mawarisōryū) and grants the ability to make anyone spin.
- NemuSoul (ネムソウル, Nemusōru; Sleep Soul): A Cryolophosaurus-based RyuSoul that holds the spirit of Kishiryu Nemusouryu (ネムソウリュウ, Nemusōryū) and grants the ability to put someone to sleep.
- KawakiSoul (カワキソウル, Kawakisōru; Dry Soul): A Pachyrhinosaurus-based RyuSoul that holds the spirit of Kishiryu Kawakisouryu (カワキソウリュウ, Kawakisōryū) and grants the ability to evaporate any moisture.
- YawarakaSoul (ヤワラカソウル, Yawarakasōru; Soft Soul): A Struthiomimus-based RyuSoul that holds the spirit of Kishiryu Yawarakasouryu (ヤワラカソウリュウ, Yawarakasōryū) and grants the ability to soften anyone or anything.
- KanaeSoul (カナエソウル, Kanaesōru; Wish Soul): A legendary RyuSoul with the power to grant wishes and was said to have contributed to the Sea Ryusoul Tribe breaking off from the main faction.

==== KyoRyuSouls ====
The KyoRyuSouls (強リュウソウル, Kyōryūsōru; Greater RyuSouls) are advanced RyuSouls that when set into a Ryusoul Ken and/or the Mosa Changer allow the Ryusoulgers to unlock special power-up KyoRyuSoul Armors (強リュウソウアーマー, Kyōryūsō Āmā) via Strong 'Saur Armament (強竜装, Kyōryūsō).

- MeraMeraSoul (メラメラソウル, Meramerasōru; Burning Soul): A KyoRyuSoul that holds the spirit of Kishiryu DimeVolcano and enables access to the pyrokinetic MeraMera Armor (メラメラアーマー, Meramera Āmā). When used in conjunction with a Ryusoul Ken, it allows one of the primary Ryusoulgers to perform the Burning Dino Slash (バーニングディーノスラッシュ, Bāningu Dīno Surasshu) finisher.
- BiriBiriSoul (ビリビリソウル, Biribirisōru; Shocking Soul): A KyoRyuSoul that holds the spirit of Kishiryu SpinoThunder and enables access to the electrokinetic BiriBiri Armor (ビリビリアーマー, Biribiri Āmā). When used in conjunction with the Mosa Breaker, it allows Ryusoul Gold to perform the Final Thunder Shot (ファイナルサンダーショット, Fainaru Sandā Shotto) finisher.
- KagayakiSoul (カガヤキソウル, Kagayakisōru; Shining Soul): A KyoRyuSoul that holds the spirit of Kishiryu ShineRaptor and enables access to the photokinetic Kagayaki Armor (カガヤキアーマー, Kagayaki Āmā), which grants the use of healing spells.
- KurayamiSoul (クラヤミソウル, Kurayamisōru; Darkness Soul): A KyoRyuSoul that holds the spirit of Kishiryu ShadowRaptor and enables access to the umbrakinetic Kurayami Armor (クラヤミアーマー, Kurayami Āmā). When used in conjunction with the Mosa Breaker, it allows Ryusoul Gold to perform the Final Black Hole Shot (ファイナルブラックホールショット, Fainaru Burakku Hōru Shotto) finisher.
- CosmoSoul (コスモソウル, Kosumosōru): A KyoRyuSoul that holds the spirit of Kishiryu CosmoRaptor and enables access to the photo-umbrakinetic Cosmo Armor (コスモアーマー, Kosumo Āmā).
- DoshinSoul (ドッシンソウル, Doshinsōru; Smash Soul): A KyoRyuSoul that holds the spirits of Kishiryu Pachygaroo and Chibigaroo, and enables access to the geokinetic Doshin Armor (ドッシンアーマー, Doshin Āmā), which grants a pair of gauntlets. When used in conjunction with a Ryusoul Ken, it allows one of the primary Ryusoulgers to perform the Dino Sonic Blow (ディノソニックブロー, Dino Sonikku Burō) finisher.
- ByuByuSoul (ビュービューソウル, Byūbyūsōru; Howling Soul): A KyoRyuSoul that holds the spirit of Kishiryu Dinomigo. When used in conjunction with the Gaisoul Ken, it allows Galsoulg to perform an aerokinetic version of the Ancient Break Edge. This KyoRyuSoul first appears in the film Kishiryu Sentai Ryusoulger the Movie: Time Slip! Dinosaur Panic.
- HieHieSoul (ヒエヒエソウル, Hiehiesōru; Freezing Soul): A KyoRyuSoul that holds the spirit of Kishiryu Pterardon and enables access to the cryokinetic HieHie Armor (ヒエヒエアーマー, Hiehie Āmā), which grants flight capabilities. When used in conjunction with a Ryusoul Ken, it allows one of the primary Ryusoulgers to perform the Blizzard Dino Slash (ブリザードディノスラッシュ, Burizādo Dino Surasshu) finisher.

==== Legend Sentai ====
- LupinSoul (ルパンソウル, Rupansōru): A Lupinranger-based RyuSoul that allows Koh, Melto, and Asuna to transform into Lupin Red, Blue, and Yellow respectively. This Ryusoul appears exclusively in the crossover film Kishiryu Sentai Ryusoulger VS Lupinranger VS Patranger the Movie.
- KiramaiSoul (キラメイソウル, Kirameisōru; Sparkle Soul): A Kiramager-based RyuSoul that allows the primary Ryusoulgers to become the armored KiramaiSoul Ryusoulgers (キラメイ装リュウソウジャー, Kirameisō Ryūsōjā). This RyuSoul appears exclusively in the crossover film Mashin Sentai Kiramager vs. Ryusoulger.

=== Kishiryu ===
The Kishiryu (騎士竜, Kishiryū; Knightosaur) are sentient dinosaur-themed mecha that were created by the Ryusoul Tribe as a countermeasure to the Druidon before being sealed within temples throughout the world. They can combine with each other via Ryusoul Combination (竜装合体, Ryūsō Gattai). Amidst the Ryusoulgers' final battle with Eras, the Kishiryu sacrifice themselves to empower the Ryusoul Calibur.

- Kishiryu Tyramigo (騎士竜ティラミーゴ, Kishiryū Tiramīgo): Ryusoul Red's personal Tyrannosaurus-themed Kishiryu that was one of the three Kishiryu sealed within the temple in the Ryusoul Tribe's village. In battle, it is equipped with the twin shoulder-mounted Knight Cannons (ナイトキャノン, Naito Kyanon), a pair of back-mounted artillery turrets, a drill on each shoulder, the Tail Whip (テイルウィップ, Teiru Wippu), and its jaws. When accompanied by its enlarged Red RyuSoul, Tyramigo can project flames from its mouth. Tyramigo is voiced by Masaki Terasoma (てらそま まさき, Terasoma Masaki).
- Kishiryu Triken (騎士竜トリケーン, Kishiryū Torikēn): Ryusoul Blue's personal Triceratops-themed Kishiryu that was one of the three Kishiryu sealed within the temple in the Ryusoul Tribe's village. In battle, it is equipped with the snout-mounted Knight Sword (ナイトソード, Naito Sōdo) blade.
- Kishiryu Ankyloze (騎士竜アンキローゼ, Kishiryū Ankirōze): Ryusoul Pink's personal Ankylosaurus-themed Kishiryu that was one of the three Kishiryu sealed within the temple in the Ryusoul Tribe's village. In battle, it is equipped with the tail-mounted Knight Hammer (ナイトハンマー, Naito Hanmā) club.
- Kishiryu TigerLance (騎士竜タイガランス, Kishiryū Taigaransu): Ryusoul Green's personal Smilodon-themed Kishiryu that is known as a Tigersaurus (タイガーサウルス, Taigāsaurusu). In battle, it is equipped with the right-sided Knight Lance (ナイトランス, Naito Ransu) blade, can execute energy strikes with its claws, and move at supersonic speed.
- Kishiryu MilNeedle (騎士竜ミルニードル, Kishiryū Mirunīdoru): Ryusoul Black's personal Miragaia-themed Kishiryu that is known as a Needlesaurus (ニードルサウルス, Nīdorusaurusu). In battle, its is equipped with several back-mounted Knight Needle (ナイトニードル, Naito Nīdoru) spines, which allow it to fire spike projectiles at its enemies.
- Kishiryu MosaRex (騎士竜モサレックス, Kishiryū Mosarekkusu): Ryusoul Gold's personal Mosasaurus-themed Kishiryu that also serves as his master. MosaRex harbored a hatred for the Land Ryusoul Tribe following their civil war 65 million years ago until it learned to accept the Ryusoulgers and joined them. In battle, it is equipped with the tail-mounted KnighTrident (ナイトライデント, Naitoraidento) blade, a pair of four-shot missile launchers under each front fin, and massive jaws. MosaRex is voiced by Ryōta Takeuchi (竹内 良太, Takeuchi Ryōta).
  - AmmoKnuckles (アンモナックルズ, Anmonakkuruzu): A pair of Ammonite-themed support Kishiryu that are partnered with MosaRex.
- Kishiryu DimeVolcano (騎士竜ディメボルケーノ, Kishiryū Dimeborukēno): A Dimetrodon-themed Kishiryu and MosaRex's sibling. Due to its power and short temper when a person answers its quizzes incorrectly, the Ryusoul Tribe sealed DimeVolcano away in a separate location. Despite this, it was frightened of people fearing it. Before the Ryusoulgers found it, DimeVolcano's only friend was Haruto Watanabe (渡辺遥斗, Watanabe Haruto), a boy recovering from an eye operation who was not afraid of the Kishiryu; even after seeing it once his eyes fully recovered. In battle, it is equipped with the back-mounted Knight Fan (ナイトファン, Naito Fan) sail, the tail-mounted Knight MeraMera Sword (ナイトメラメラソード, Naito Meramera Sōdo) blade, and can breathe fire from its mouth. DimeVolcano is voiced by Wataru Takagi (高木 渉, Takagi Wataru).
- Kishiryu ShineRaptor (騎士竜シャインラプター, Kishiryū Shainraputā): A white Velociraptor-themed Kishiryu. In battle, it is equipped with the tail-mounted Kagayaki Sword (カガヤキソード, Kagayaki Sōdo) blade, and can generate a healing light and travel at the speed of light.
- Kishiryu ShadowRaptor (騎士竜シャドーラプター, Kishiryū Shadōraputā): A black Velociraptor-themed Kishiryu. In battle, it is equipped with the tail-mounted Kurayami Gun (クラヤミガン, Kurayami Gan) rifle, and can generate black holes and hide in the shadows.
- Kishiryu Pachygaroo (騎士竜パキガルー, Kishiryū Pakigarū): A Stygimoloch/kangaroo-themed Kishiryu that is known as a Pachygaroosaurus (パキガルーサウルス, Pakigarūsaurusu). In battle, it is equipped with a pair of Knight Glove (ナイトグローブ, Naito Gurōbu) gauntlets and the tail-mounted Knight Thruster (ナイトスラスター, Naito Surasutā).
  - Kishiryu Chibigaroo (騎士竜チビガルー, Kishiryū Chibigarū): A Stygimoloch/joey-themed support Kishiryu and Pachygaroo's child that rides in its pouch. Chibigaroo is voiced by M·A·O.
- Kishiryu Pterardon (騎士竜プテラードン, Kishiryū Puterādon): A Pteranodon-themed Kishiryu that fled into space to avoid being sealed and left in a temple only to end up being sealed in its egg-like Pit Mode (ピットモード, Pitto Mōdo); losing access to its abilities and falling into Earth's oceans. MosaRex discovered it and left it in Oto's care, who nicknamed it Pii-tan (ピーたん, Pītan). After being freed, Pterardon regained its abilities, such as firing a sub-zero ice beam from its Pterardon Head (プテラードンヘッド, Puterādon Heddo), achieving space flight via a pair of Knight Edge (ナイトエッジ, Naito Eiji) pterosaur wings, and the use of the tail-mounted HieHie Claw (ヒエヒエクロー, Hiehie Kurō). Pterardon is voiced by Takeshi Kusao (草尾 毅, Kusao Takeshi).
- Kishiryu Dinomigo (騎士竜ディノミーゴ, Kishiryū Dinomīgo): A Ceratosaurus-themed Kishiryu that was the first Kishiryu created 65 million years ago by Valma to aid in his plans for world domination. This Kishiryu appears exclusively in the film Kishiryu Sentai Ryusoulger the Movie: Time Slip! Dinosaur Panic.
  - Kishiryu Cobrago (騎士竜コブラーゴ, Kishiryū Koburāgo): A pair of cobra-themed support Kishiryu that are partnered with Dinomigo. In battle, they are each equipped with a Knight ByuByu Sword (ナイトビュービューソード, Naito Byūbyū Sōdo) and a Cobrago Head (コブラーゴヘッド, Koburāgo Heddo). These Kishiryu appear exclusively in Kishiryu Sentai Ryusoulger the Movie: Time Slip! Dinosaur Panic.

==== Hybrids ====
- Kishiryu SpinoThunder (騎士竜スピノサンダー, Kishiryū Supinosandā): A Spinosaurus-themed Kishiryu composed of DimeVolcano, MosaRex, and the AmmoKnuckles. In battle, it can shoot lightning from either its mouth or the sail on its back.
- Kishiryu CosmoRaptor (騎士竜コスモラプター, Kishiryū Kosumoraputā): A white/black Velociraptor-themed Kishiryu composed of ShineRaptor and ShadowRaptor who were stolen by the Druidon Tribe before they fled into space 65 million years ago. During that time, they fed on light and darkness, eventually gaining the ability to combine into CosmoRaptor and harness cosmic energy. In battle, it wears the Cosmo Goggle (コスモゴーグル, Kosumo Gōguru) visor created from its component Kishiryu's crests, and can absorb energy from the universe and create wormholes.
- Kishiryu Ptyramigo (騎士竜プティラミーゴ, Kishiryū Putiramīgo): A dragon-themed Kishiryu composed of Tyramigo and Pterardon.

==== Ryusoul Combinations ====
- KishiryuOh (キシリュウオー, Kishiryūō; Knightosaur King): Kishiryu Tyramigo's humanoid form when combined with an enlarged Red RyuSoul that can use the Joint Change (ジョイントチェンジ, Jointo Chenji) system to rearrange Tyramigo's drills, turrets, the Tail Whip, or the Tyramigo Head (ティラミーゴヘッド, Tiramīgo Heddo) onto different parts of its body for increased combat versatility. Its finisher is the Tyra DynaBite (ティラダイナバイト, Tira Dainabaito).
  - KishiryuOh Three Knights (キシリュウオースリーナイツ, Kishiryūō Surī Naitsu): The Ryusoulgers' first giant robot composed of KishiryuOh and Kishiryu Triken and Ankyloze that wields the Knight Sword. Its finisher is the KishiryuOh: Final Blade (キシリュウオー・ファイナルブレード, Kishiryūō Fainaru Burēdo).
    - KishiryuOh Fortress (キシリュウオーフォートレス): A variation of KishiryuOh Three Knights that assumes a tank-like form to gain additional speed and armoured warfare capabilities.
    - KishiryuOh Triken (キシリュウオートリケーン, Kishiryūō Torikēn): A variation of KishiryuOh Three Knights that replaces the Red RyuSoul with an enlarged Blue RyuSoul to gain a boost in its swordsmanship skills. Its finisher is the Triken Strike (トリケーンストライク, Torikēn Sutoraiku).
    - KishiryuOh Ankyloze (キシリュウオーアンキローゼ, Kishiryūō Ankirōze): A variation of KishiryuOh Three Knights that replaces the Red RyuSoul with an enlarged Pink RyuSoul to wield the Knight Hammer. Its finisher is the Ankyloze Bomber (アンキローゼボンバー, Ankirōze Bonbā).
  - KishiryuOh TigerLance (キシリュウオータイガランス, Kishiryūō Taigaransu): A combination of Kishiryu Tyramigo, Triken, Ankyloze, TigerLance, and an enlarged Green RyuSoul that possesses immense swordsmanship skills and wields the Knight Lance. Its finisher is the Tiger Sonic Lancer (タイガーソニックランサー, Taigā Sonikku Ransā).
  - KishiryuOh MilNeedle (キシリュウオーミルニードル, Kishiryūō Mirunīdoru): A combination of Kishiryu Tyramigo, Triken, Ankyloze, MilNeedle, and an enlarged Black RyuSoul that possesses a sumo wrestler-based fighting style and dual wields the twin Knight Maces (ナイトメイス, Naito Meisu). Its finisher is the Needle Crusher (ニードルクラッシャー, Nīdoru Kurasshā).
  - KishiryuOh Five Knights (キシリュウオーファイブナイツ, Kishiryūō Faibu Naitsu): The Ryusoulgers' second giant robot composed of KishiryuOh and Kishiryu Triken, Ankyloze, TigerLance, and MilNeedle that wields the Knight Lance and the Knight Shield (ナイトシールド, Naito Shīrudo). Its finisher is the Five Knights Ultimate Slash (ファイブナイツアルティメットスラッシュ, Faibu Naitsu Arutimetto Surasshu). During the events of the crossover film Mashin Sentai Kiramager vs. Ryusoulger, the primary Ryusoulgers are able to manifest KishiryuOh Five Knights through Mabushina's tears resonating with their Kiramental.
    - KishiryuOh Five Knights Blue (キシリュウオーファイブナイツブルー, Kishiryūō Faibu Naitsu Burū): A variation of KishiryuOh Five Knights that replaces the Red RyuSoul with an enlarged Blue RyuSoul.
    - KishiryuOh Five Knights Black (キシリュウオーファイブナイツブラック, Kishiryūō Faibu Naitsu Burakku): A variation of KishiryuOh Five Knights that replaces the Red RyuSoul with an enlarged Black RyuSoul. Its finisher is the Five Knights Black Ultimate Slash (ファイブナイツブラックアルティメットスラッシュ, Faibu Naitsu Burakku Arutimetto Surasshu).
  - KishiryuOh DimeVolcano (キシリュウオーディメボルケーノ, Kishiryūō Dimeborukēno): A combination of Kishiryu Tyramigo, DimeVolcano, and an enlarged MeraMeraSoul that is equipped with the twin shoulder-mounted Volcano Cannons (ボルケーノキャノン, Borukēno Kyanon) and wields the Knight MeraMera Sword and Knight Fan. Its finisher is the Volcano Slash (ボルケーノスラッシュ, Borukēno Surasshu).
  - Gigant KishiryuOh (ギガントキシリュウオー, Giganto Kishiryūō; Gigant Knightosaur King): A combination of KishiryuOh and Kishiryu SpinoThunder that is equipped with the Tyramigo Head, the MosaRex Head (モサレックスヘッド, Mosarekkusu Heddo), the Volcano Cannons, and the Knight Boarder (ナイトボーダー, Naito Bōdā) feet pads. Its finisher is the Gigant Double Bite (ギガントダブルバイト, Giganto Daburu Baito).
  - KishiryuOh CosmoRaptor (キシリュウオーコスモラプター, Kishiryūō Kosumoraputā): A combination of Kishiryu Tyramigo, CosmoRaptor, and an enlarged CosmoSoul that wields the Kagayaki Sword and Kurayami Gun. Its finisher is the KishiryuOh: Cosmic Breaker (キシリュウオー・コズミックブレイカー, Kishiryūō Kozumikku Bureikā).
  - KishiryuOh Pachygaroo (キシリュウオーパキガルー, Kishiryūō Pakigarū): A combination of Kishiryu Tyramigo, Triken, Ankyloze, Pachygaroo, Chibigaroo, and an enlarged DoshinSoul that possesses a boxer-based fighting style and is equipped with the Knight Gloves. Its finisher is the Boost Break Blow (ブーストブレイクブロー, Būsuto Bureiku Burō).
  - KishiryuOh Jet (キシリュウオージェット, Kishiryūō Jetto): A combination of KishiryuOh and Kishiryu Pachygaroo, Chibigaroo, and Pterardon that combines KishiryuOh Pachygaroo's boxing skills and YokuryuOh's flight capabilities. Its finisher is the KishiryuOh: Blizzard Inferno (キシリュウオー・ブリザードインフェルノ, Kishiryūō Burizādo Inferuno).
  - King KishiryuOh (キングキシリュウオー, Kingu Kishiryūō; King Knightosaur King): A combination of KishiryuOh and Kishiryu MosaRex and Pterardon that wields the Knight Edges, the Knight Boarders, and the Tyramigo, MosaRex, and Pterardon Heads. Its finisher is the King KishiryuOh: Big Bang Evolution (キングキシリュウオー・ビッグバンエボリューション, Kingu Kishiryūō Biggu Ban Eboryūshon).
- KishiryuNeptune (キシリュウネプチューン, Kishiryū Nepuchūn; Knightosaur Neptune): Kishiryu MosaRex's humanoid form when combined with the AmmoKnuckles and an enlarged Gold RyuSoul that is fast, agile, and skilled in underwater combat, wields the KnighTrident, and can launch the AmmoKnuckles for a rocket punch attack. Its finisher is the KishiryuNeptune: Tornado Strike (キシリュウネプチューン・トルネードストライク, Kishiryū Nepuchūn Torunēdo Sutoraiku).
  - KishiryuNeptune ShadowRaptor (キシリュウネプチューンシャドーラプター, Kishiryū Nepuchūn Shadōraputā): A combination of Kishiryu MosaRex, ShadowRaptor, the AmmoKnuckles, and an enlarged KurayamiSoul that wields the Kurayami Gun. Its finisher is the KishiryuNeptune: Black Hole Cannon (キシリュウネプチューン・ブラックホールキャノン, Kishiryū Nepuchūn Burakku Hōru Kyanon).
  - KishiryuNeptune CosmoRaptor (キシリュウネプチューンコスモラプター, Kishiryū Nepuchūn Kosumoraputā): A combination of Kishiryu MosaRex, CosmoRaptor, the AmmoKnuckles, and an enlarged CosmoSoul that wields the Kagayaki Sword and Kurayami Gun. Its finisher is the KishiryuNeptune: Cosmic Breaker (キシリュウネプチューン・コズミックブレイカー, Kishiryū Nepuchūn Kozumikku Bureikā).
- YokuryuOh (ヨクリュウオー, Yokuryūō; Wingosaur King): Kishiryu Pterardon's humanoid form when combined with an enlarged HieHieSoul that, being the sleekest of the Ryusoulgers' giant robots, can achieve flight and temporarily transform its surroundings into an icy environment. It also wields the HieHie Claw, the Knight Edges, and the Pterardon Head. Its finisher is the YokuryuOh: Blizzard Claw Strike (ヨクリュウオー・ブリザードクローストライク, Yokuryūō Burizādo Kurō Sutoraiku).
- Kishiryuzin (キシリュウジン, Kishiryūjin; Knightosaur God): Kishiryu Dinomigo's humanoid form when combined with Kishiryu Cobrago and an enlarged ByuByuSoul that is comparable to KishiryuOh in speed and agility, but its swordsmanship skills and strength are far superior. It also dual wields the Knight ByuByu Swords and can fire Flame Beams (フレイムビーム, Fureimu Bīmu) from the Cobrago Heads. This combination appears exclusively in the film Kishiryu Sentai Ryusoulger the Movie: Time Slip! Dinosaur Panic.

== Recurring characters ==
=== Ryusoul Tribe ===
==== Master Red ====
Master Red (マスターレッド, Masutā Reddo) is Koh and Nada's master and the previous Ryusoul Red who is killed by Tankjoh when the Druidon returned to Earth.

Master Red is portrayed by Masaya Kikawada (黄川田 将也, Kikawada Masaya).

==== Master Blue ====
Master Blue (マスターブルー, Masutā Burū) is Melto's master and the previous Ryusoul Blue who is killed by the Dragon Minosaur after the Druidon return to Earth.

Master Blue is portrayed by Jouji Shibue (渋江 譲二, Shibue Jōji).

==== Master Pink ====
Master Pink (マスターピンク, Masutā Pinku) is Asuna's master and the previous Ryusoul Pink, who is killed by the Dragon Minosaur when the Druidon return to Earth. However, she is temporarily resurrected by the Necromancer Minosaur, which spawned from her negative emotions at the time of her death. After it is destroyed, she is sent back to the afterlife.

Master Pink is portrayed by Miyuu Sawai (沢井 美優, Sawai Miyū).

==== Elder ====
Elder (長老, Chōrō) is the current elder of the Ryusoul Tribe appointed Koh, Melto, and Asuna their Masters' successors and told them about the Druidon and the Kishiryu. After the tribe's village was destroyed by a Minosaur, he acquires a kebab truck and goes on to run a café.

The elder is portrayed by Jirō Dan (団 時朗, Dan Jirō).

==== Oto ====
Oto (オト) is Canalo's 123-year-old sister and member of the Sea Ryusoul Tribe who resembles a young teenage girl. Upon meeting the other Ryusoulgers, she falls in love with Melto and starts hanging out with him. After finding and taking care of Kishiryu Pterardon, Oto can pilot the Kishiryu's humanoid form despite not being a Ryusoulger. As of Kishiryu Sentai Ryusoulger VS Lupinranger VS Patranger the Movie, Oto begins to master hand-to-hand combat.

Oto is portrayed by Sora Tamaki (田牧 そら, Tamaki Sora).

==== Seto ====
Seto (セトー, Setō) is an ancient Ryusoul Tribesman whose soul was awakened after Naohisa Tatsui entered his tomb, possessing the man's body to provide advice to the Ryusoulgers, bring CosmoRaptor from space, and guide them to the Temple of the Beginning to save the Ryusoul Calibur. As the Ryusoulgers' final battle against the Druidon Tribe approaches, Seto uses the last of his powers to become Ryusoul Brown (リュウソウブラウン, Ryūsō Buraun) and pass on to the afterlife at the end of his duty.

Instead of using a Ryusoul Ken, Seto can summon the armor of Ryusoul Brown directly onto Naohisa and wields similar weapons as Gaisoulg. While still capable of harnessing the Ryusouls' powers, Naohisa's aged body hampers most of Seto's fighting prowess.

While possessing Naohisa Tatsui's body, Seto is portrayed by Mitsuru Fukikoshi.

==== Master Green ====
Master Green (マスターグリーン, Masutā Gurīn) is the previous Ryusoul Green, who only appears in flashbacks that depict him as both Master Black's partner and a past wearer of the Gaisoulg armor after he was forced to don it when the Druidon attacked Earth five centuries before the series. As a result, Master Green was forced to leave Earth to stop Gaisoulg's rampage and presumed to have died of natural causes as the cursed armor wandered the cosmos until the events of Super Sentai Strongest Battle.

Master Green is portrayed by an unknown actor.

==== Master Black ====
Master Black (マスターブラック, Masutā Burakku) is Towa and Bamba's master and the previous Ryusoul Black who once served as Master Green's partner. In the past, he infiltrated the Druidon Tribe after killing Druidon general Saden and taking his place, but Pricious carded his heart to subjugate him into complete obedience. After returning to Earth, Master Black is eventually able to free himself from Pricious' control.

Master Black is portrayed by Masaru Nagai (永井 大, Nagai Masaru).

=== Druidon Tribe ===
The Warfare Tribe Druidon (戦闘民族ドルイドン, Sentō Minzoku Doruidon) are a race of evil monsters led by chess piece-themed generals who existed alongside the Ryusoul Tribe and sought world dominion before they were forced to flee into space during the extinction event that killed the dinosaurs. 65 million years later however, having continued their campaign on various planets, the Druidon return to Earth to resume their conquest of it. As the series progresses, the Druidon are revealed to have been created by Eras as a means to exterminate her previous creation, the Ryusoul Tribe, after they became warlike and aggressive. However, the originally benign Druidon also became corrupt, leading Eras to make the decision to destroy both tribes. As of the series finale, the surviving Druidon members turn on Eras and aid the Ryusoulgers in their final battle against her before departing to Kleon's homeworld.

==== Eras ====
Eras (エラス, Erasu) is the queen-themed leader and progenitor of both the Ryusoul Tribe and Druidon Tribe, having created both races as a means of protecting Earth. After both of her creations deviated from their intended purpose however, she deemed them threats to the planet and attempted to start anew by destroying them. Before she could do so, she was sealed by the Ryusoul Calibur within the Temple of the Beginning. When Seto learns she is siphoning the sword's energy in the present, he is forced to have the Ryusoulgers retrieve the Ryusoul Calibur in order to save it. With the seal broken, Eras gradually revives herself and creates new Druidon generals to accelerate the process. After absorbing Pricious to create a physical form for herself, she places the Ryusoulgers and humanity into a deep slumber so she can use their lifeforce to rejuvenate Earth while destroying all traces of human civilization. Nonetheless, the Ryusoulgers manage to escape their slumber with Kleon's help, weaken Eras with their Kishiryu and the Ryusoul Calibur, and destroy her. In the afterlife, Koh convinces Eras that both her progeny and the human race can still build a better future despite their past mistakes.

Eras is voiced by Romi Park (朴 璐美, Paku Romi).

==== Kleon ====
Kleon (クレオン, Kureon) is a laid-back slime-based, mushroom-themed alien lifeform that the Druidon recruited during their time away from Earth who supports them by using his slime on ideal people to spawn Minosaurs from, though he suffers abuse from most of the Druidon's number. After finding Wiserue's carded heart, Kleon leaves the Druidon to find him as he was the only member who treated him right. He later returns to aid the Ryusoulgers, freeing them from Eras' slumber so they can defeat her. After Eras' death, Kleon returns to his homeworld with Wiserue and Pricious. During the events of the V-Cinema Mashin Sentai Kiramager vs. Ryusoulger, Kleon is kidnapped by Yodonna so she can use his slime to destroy the Kiramagers.

In battle, Kleon can use his slime-based body to reform himself if he is destroyed.

Kleon is voiced by Ryoko Shiraishi (白石 涼子, Shiraishi Ryōko).

==== Tankjoh ====
Tankjoh (タンクジョウ, Tankujō) is a merciless rook/tank-themed Druidon warrior who leads the Druidons' first attack on Earth upon their return, desiring to wipe out the Ryusoulgers and conquer Earth. After killing Master Red, he absorbs seismic energy to increase his power. As his death would have released all of the energy in a destructive wave, the Ryusoulgers use KishiryuOh Five Knights to blast Tankjoh into the stratosphere in order to destroy him safely. Several months later, Tankjoh is resurrected by the Necromancer Minosaur and attempts to exact revenge against the Ryusoulgers for his death, only to be sent back to the afterlife by Ryusoul Blue, Pink, Green, and Black.

In battle, Tankjoh wields the Rooklaymore (ルークレイモア, Rūkureimoa) broadsword and can fire energy beams from his chest-mounted Castlingrander (キャスリングランダー, Kyasuringurandā) cannon.

Tankjoh is voiced by Jouji Nakata (中田 譲治, Nakata Jōji).

==== Wiserue ====
Wiserue (ワイズルー, Waizurū) is a flamboyant, egotistical, tricky, and short-tempered bishop/ringmaster-themed Druidon sorcerer who takes over the Druidons' attack on Earth following Tankjoh's death. After Gachireus arrives on Earth however, Wiserue is temporarily relieved of command until the former's first defeat. When Gachireus eventually returns, Wiserue shares command with him until Pricious arrives and subjugates them both by taking control of their hearts. When Eras' resurrection draws near, Wiserue is forced to attack the Ryusoulgers to prove his worth to the Druidon cause and is seemingly killed in battle by Max Ryusoul Red. In reality, he faked his death and went into hiding before returning to aid the Ryusoulgers against Eras. Following her death, Wiserue leaves Earth with Kleon and a revived Pricious to see the former's homeworld.

In battle, Wiserue wields the Stickiller (ステッキラー, Sutekkirā) staff that can fire energy bolts and doubles as a sword, possesses hypnotism through his eyes, and illusion-based shapeshifting.

Wiserue is voiced by Hikaru Midorikawa (緑川 光, Midorikawa Hikaru).

==== Gachireus ====
Gachireus (ガチレウス, Gachireusu) is an arrogant and ill-tempered rook/submarine/captain-themed Druidon general bent on the Ryusoul Tribe's destruction. He briefly takes command of the Druidon's invasion of Earth after sending Wiserue away for not doing the job fast enough and overpowers the Ryusoulgers once he learns enough of their techniques. However, he ends up being mortally wounded by KishiryuNeptune, an opponent he never fought or studied, and presumed dead. In reality, Gachireus survived and left the planet to treat his wounds before returning months later to exact revenge against the Ryusoul Tribe. During this time, he shares command with Wiserue until Pricious arrives and subjugates them both by taking control of their hearts. Following this, Gachireus makes several attempts on the Ryusoulgers' lives until Pricious decides to cut his losses and forcibly enlarges Gachireus so he can be killed by King KishiryuOh.

In battle, Gachireus is equipped with the twin shoulder-mounted Gachiraid Cannons (ガチレイド砲, Gachireido Hō) and a pair of Screw Claw (スクリュークロー, Sukuryū Kurō) gauntlets as well as the ability to increase his strength by countering any attack he takes once he is hit with it or sees it once.

Gachireus is voiced by Tetsu Inada (稲田 徹, Inada Tetsu).

==== Pricious ====
Pricious (プリシャス, Purishasu) is a treacherous and power-hungry knight/jester-themed Druidon commander. He arrives to Earth following Uden's demise to revive Eras, usurping Wiserue and Gachireus as the invasion's acting leader by taking control of their hearts in the process. He also develops a grudge against Koh for defeating him. After the Ryusoulgers use King KishiryuOh to destroy his Space Dragon, Pricious forces Master Black to protect Eras and destroy the Ryusoul Calibur. He later learns of the Druidons' true purpose before he is defeated by the Ryusoulgers and Eras devours him in order to create a new body for herself. Following Eras' death, Wiserue and Kleon bring a revived Pricious with them as they depart for Kleon's homeworld.

In battle, Pricious wields the double-bladed Priciouslasher (プリシャスラッシャー, Purishasurasshā) naginata, a deck of cards which he can manipulate to produce different effects, and the ability to teleport by turning himself into liquid metal. He also commands a Space Dragon (スペースドラゴン, Supēsu Doragon), a giant draconic cyborg monster, until it is destroyed by King KishiryuOh.

Pricious is voiced by Romi Park (朴 璐美, Paku Romi).

==== Gunjoji ====
Gunjoji (ガンジョージ, Ganjōji) are twin knight/Gatling gun-themed Druidon brothers, with the older Gunjoji being more fully developed and loyal to Pricious while the younger Gunjoji II (ガンジョージII, Ganjōji Tsū) displays limited speech capacity. After the Ryusoulgers remove the Ryusoul Calibur, Eras creates the Gunjoji brothers to accelerate her revival. However, Gunjoji II is killed by Master Black, who manages to prevent him from self-destructing, while the first Gunjoji is destroyed by Ryusoul Blue, Green, Black, and Gold.

In battle, the Gunjoji brothers use brute strength, can fire energy blasts from their chest-mounted Gatling Cannon (ガトリング砲, Gatoringu-Hō), and possess Tankjoh's ability to convert stored seismic energy into a destructive wave that can be released upon their deaths.

The Gunjoji brothers are voiced by Tomoaki Maeno (前野 智昭, Maeno Tomoaki).

==== Yabasword ====
Yabasword (ヤバソード, Yabasōdo) is an infantile king/samurai-themed Druidon general who Eras creates after the Gunjoji brothers once her resurrection is nearly completed. Acquiring a taste for rampaging during his first fight with the Ryusoulgers, Yabasword goes berserk under Eras' influence to kill the Ryusoulgers and his fellow Druidon. In response, Pricious is forced to kill Yabasword. Amidst her attempt to siphon humanity's life force, Eras revives Yabasword to prevent anyone from awakening the slumbering humans until he is destroyed by King KishiryuOh.

In battle, Yabasword is equipped with the right arm-mounted Great Sword (大刀, Daitō) blade and wields the Small Sword (小刀, Kogatana) tantō.

Yabasword is voiced by Kōzō Shioya (塩屋 浩三, Shioya Kōzō).

==== Other members ====
- Uden (ウデン): A warlike and quiet bishop/cannon-themed Druidon assassin unto Pricious who wields a ninjatō and is capable of copying enemy attacks for his personal use. After coming to Earth to prepare it for Pricious' arrival, Uden traps the Ryusoulgers in his personal labyrinth-like dimension so he can use their powers against them. He kills Nada in the process, but fails to stop the Ryusoul Tribesman from freeing Koh, who uses his fallen ally's spirit and armor to become Max Ryusoul Red and destroy the assassin to free his comrades. Uden is voiced by Volcano Ōta (ボルケーノ太田, Borukēno Ōta).
- Saden (サデン): A talkative bishop/cannon-themed Druidon general who also wields a ninjatō. In the past, he accompanied Pricious to the Sky Temple to find a way to free Eras from the seal placed on her. While he was killed by Master Black, who assumed his identity to infiltrate the Druidon, Pricious discovers the deception and places the knight under his control to serve Eras. Saden is voiced by Masaru Nagai.

==== Drun Soldiers ====
The Drun Soldiers (ドルン兵, Dorun-hei) are the Druidons' pawn/conquistador-themed foot soldiers who possess shields strapped to their backs and each wield spears.

==== Minosaurs ====
The Minosaurs (マイナソー, Mainasō) are mythical creature-themed monsters that spawn from a human's negative emotions and can drain the host's life energy in order to reach their larger dragon-like, full-grown Minosaur Complete Body (マイナソー完全体, Mainasō Kanzentai). (Note: In some magazines, the Minosaur Complete Body is also referred to as the Dragon Minosaur (ドラゴンマイナソー, Doragon Mainasō).) Some occur naturally while others are produced by Kleon targeting ideal organisms or objects with strong negative emotions. Some Minosaurs sport dinosaur-like tails.

- Minosaur Complete Body: A wild Minosaur that can breathe fire, create shockwaves with its roar, and produce energy and lightning projectiles. It stalked the Ryusoul Tribe's village when the Druidon return to Earth and goes on a rampage, killing Masters Blue and Pink before it is destroyed by KishiryuOh Three Knights.
- Basilisk Minosaurs (バジリスクマイナソー, Bajirisuku Mainasō): A series of lesser Minosaurs spawned from unknown hosts. One is easily destroyed by Ryusoul Green and Black while a second one is easily destroyed by Ryusoul Gold.
- Unicorn Minosaur (ユニコーンマイナソー, Yunikōn Mainasō): A Minosaur who wields the Unicorn Saber (ユニコーンサーブル, Yunikōn Sāburu) rapier that Kleon created from professional fencer Takanori Mishima (三島 隆則, Mishima Takanori) before it is destroyed by KishiryuOh. The Unicorn Minosaur is voiced by Tomohiro Asaeda (朝枝 知紘, Asaeda Tomohiro), who also portrays its host.
- Medusa Minosaur (メドゥーサマイナソー, Medūsa Mainasō): A Gorgon-themed Minosaur who wields the Cobramberge (コブランベルジュ, Koburanberuju) sword that Kleon created from Ui before it is destroyed by KishiryuOh Three Knights. The Medusa Minosaur is voiced by Mana Kinjo, who also portrays Ui.
- Kraken Minosaur (クラーケンマイナソー, Kurāken Mainasō): A Minosaur with water gun-like arms that Kleon created from neglectful father Tetsuya Shirota (城田 徹也, Shirota Tetsuya) before it is destroyed by KishiryuOh TigerLance. The Kraken Minosaur is voiced by Masato Mitani (三谷 昌登, Mitani Masato), who also portrays its host.
- Cerberus Minosaur (ケルベロスマイナソー, Keruberosu Mainasō): (Note: On the official website at Toei Company, the younger Cerberus Minosaur is also referred to as the Orthrus Minosaur (オルトロスマイナソー, Orutorosu Mainasō).) A Minosaur with venomous fangs that Kleon created from local animal health center employee Sanae Hiiragi (柊 早苗, Hiiragi Sanae) before it is destroyed by Ryusoul Black.
  - Cerberus Minosaur (Elder) (ケルベロスマイナソー (兄), Keruberosu Mainasō (Ani)): The elder brother of the previous Cerberus Minosaur that was also created from Sanae before it is destroyed by KishiryuOh Five Knights.
- Cockatrice Minosaur (コカトリスマイナソー, Kokatorisu Mainasō): A Minosaur capable of producing a loud screeching noise that Kleon created from Planet Cepeus' Princess Fita (フィータ, Fīta) before it is destroyed by KishiryuOh Five Knights.
- Mimic Minosaur (ミミックマイナソー, Mimikku Mainasō): A Minosaur that can trap its victims in a pocket dimension called Wonder Land (ワンダーランド, Wandā Rando) and create illusions. Unlike most of the other Minosaurs, Kleon created it from an unopened chest from an antique store before it is destroyed by Ryusoul Black.
- Troll Minosaur (トロールマイナソー, Torōru Mainasō): A rock-skinned Minosaur that uses shields to absorb and redirect kinetic energy that Kleon created from boxing student Kenta Mori (森 健太, Mori Kenta) before it is destroyed by KishiryuOh Ankyloze. The Troll Minosaur is voiced by Ōshirō Maeda (前田 旺志郎, Maeda Ōshirō), who also portrays its host.
- Shen Minosaur (シンマイナソー, Shin Mainasō): A Minosaur that can generate fog, create illusions, fire purple bolts from small head-mounted cannons, and arm-mounted barb-like blades. Kleon created it from firefighter academy student/aspiring director Masaaki Shiina (椎名 雅章, Shiina Masaaki) before it is destroyed by KishiryuOh DimeVolcano. The Shen Minosaur is voiced by Mizuki Maeda (前田 瑞貴, Maeda Mizuki), who also portrays its host.
- Mummy Minosaur (ミイラマイナソー, Miira Mainasō): A Minosaur capable of using its mummy bandages for various purposes, teleporting, generating lightning bolts from its arms, and firing a beam that forces victims to tell the truth. An unknown source or individual created it from Mioko Karino (狩野 澪子, Karino Mioko), Prime Minister of Japan and a member of the Ryusoul Tribe, before it is destroyed by KishiryuOh DimeVolcano.
- Kelpie Minosaur (ケルピーマイナソー, Kerupī Mainasō): A hydrokinetic Minosaur that Kleon created from host Kazuma Kuta (久田 カズマ, Kuta Kazuma). Though it overpowers the primary Ryusoulgers, it is destroyed by Ryusoul Gold. The Kelpie Minosaur is voiced by Yōsuke Yokota (横田 陽介, Yokota Yōsuke), who also portrays its host.
- Pan Minosaur (パーンマイナソー, Pān Mainasō): A satyr-themed Minosaur with magnokinesis and superhuman jumping via its red and blue-colored horns, which allow it to fire attraction and repelling beams respectively as well as a combined purple magnetic energy beam from its forehead. Kleon created it from internet celebrity, DON Jiro (DONじろう, Don Jirō), before it is destroyed by MosaRex. The Pan Minosaur is voiced by Yōhei Kaneshige (金重 陽平, Kaneshige Yōhei), who also portrays its host.
- Ghost Ship Minosaur (ゴーストシップマイナソー, Gōsuto Shippu Mainasō): A Minosaur who wields a rake for a right arm, a hook for a left arm, cannons capable of firing sand and energy-based cannonballs, and possesses burrowing capabilities and the ability to create nets. Kleon created it from cram school teacher Emiko Hamano (浜野 江美子, Hamano Emiko), Bamba's ex-girlfriend from 50 years ago, before it is destroyed by KishiryuOh TigerLance and SpinoThunder.
- Golem Minosaur (ゴーレムマイナソー, Gōremu Mainasō): A Minosaur capable of absorbing and utilizing people's wishes, duplicating and reassembling itself, invulnerability, and producing energy blasts. Unlike most of the other Minosaurs, Kleon created it from a wishing stone that grew to resent hearing people's wishes without breaks. After it grows larger than previous Minosaurs, it is destroyed by Gigant KishiryuOh.
- Arachne Minosaur (アラクネーマイナソー, Arakunē Mainasō): A spider-themed Minosaur that wields a whistle capable of teleporting people to a special detention room. Kleon created it from frustrated elementary school teacher Misako Iimura (飯村美佐子, Iimura Misako), who displays a hatred for rule breakers, before it is destroyed by Gigant KishiryuOh. The Arachne Minosaur is voiced by Yukari Taki (滝 裕可里, Taki Yukari), who also portrays its host.
- Grimoire Minosaur (グリモワールマイナソー, Gurimowāru Mainasō): An inorganic Minosaur capable of bringing anything it draws in its sketchbook to life as well as trapping people in said sketchbook by drawing them. Kleon created it from young artist Shōtarō (生太郎) before it is destroyed by KishiryuOh Five Knights and KishiryuNeptune.
- Necromancer Minosaur (ネクロマンサーマイナソー, Nekuromansā Mainasō): A Minosaur capable of generating illusions, levitating, and bringing the dead back to life by replacing them with something living. It was born from Master Pink upon her death, who the monster temporarily resurrected, before it is destroyed by KishiryuOh CosmoRaptor.
- Dwarf Minosaur (ドワーフマイナソー, Dowāfu Mainasō): A Minosaur with martial arts skills, the ability to shoot strawberries from its head, and a spatula that allows it form a cake wall for defensive purposes. Kleon created it from martial artist, Mao Yaomasu (八尾増 麻央, Yaomasu Mao), after she was denied her dream of going to Paris to become a pastry chef before it is destroyed by KishiryuNeptune CosmoRaptor.
- Grim Reaper Minosaur (グリム・リーパーマイナソー, Gurimu Rīpā Mainasō): A Minosaur capable of stealing people's souls, pixelating itself so it can travel through the internet, and producing clones of itself. Unlike most of the other Minosaurs, Kleon accidentally created it when his friend and AnikinTV's host, Anikin (アニキン), drank his slime before it is destroyed by KishiryuOh CosmoRaptor.
- Dodomeki Minosaur (ドドメキマイナソー, Dodomeki Mainasō): A multi-eyed Minosaur with omnidirectional vision, a kindness stealing laser that it can fire from its center eye, purple lasers fired from its other eyes, pincers that can fire energy bolts, and enhanced durability. Kleon created it from Chika Sudō (須藤 千佳, Sudō Chika), who desired kindness, before it is destroyed by KishiryuOh Pachygaroo.
- Beelzebub Minosaur (ベルゼブブマイナソー, Beruzebubu Mainasō): A microscopic Minosaur with a whip-like tail and the ability to transfer any damage it takes to whoever it wraps said tail around. Kleon created it from frustrated husband Ranto Itō (伊藤 蘭斗, Itō Ranto) before it is destroyed by KishiryuOh Pachygaroo.
- Poltergeist Minosaur (ポルターガイストマイナソー, Porutāgaisuto Mainasō): A Minosaur capable of poisoning anything it touches. Unlike most of the other Minosaurs, Kleon created it from several unwanted things before it is destroyed by KishiryuOh Pachygaroo.
- Dullahan Minosaur (デュラハンマイナソー, Deyurahan Mainasō): A "high-spec" Minosaur capable of producing a blinding flash that only affects women and wields two arm blades. Kleon created it from self-centered, self-proclaimed "high-spec" surgeon Atsushi Miura (三浦 敦史, Miura Atsushi). After overpowering the Ryusoulgers and fighting Gaisoulg, it is destroyed by Ryusoul Red.
- Fairy Minosaur (フェアリーマイナソー, Fearī Mainasō): A flying, non-humanoid Minosaur capable of entrancing people into a dancing frenzy. Kleon created it from an unnamed trumpeter before it is destroyed by YokuryuOh.
- Jack-o'-Lantern Minosaur (ジャックオーランタンマイナソー, Jakkuōrantan Mainasō): A Minosaur who wields the Halloweenbrella (ハロウィンブレラ, Harowinburera) umbrella and a basket of candies capable of absorbing people's hatred in order to produce multicolored rain that incites rage in people. Kleon created it from a Drun Soldier before it is destroyed by KishiryuOh Jet.
- Sylph Minosaur (シルフマイナソー, Shirufu Mainasō): A Minosaur that possesses superhuman speed. Kleon created it from racecar driver Saki Kōda (幸田 沙希, Kōda Saki), who wanted to change herself to meet others' expectations, before it is destroyed by King KishiryuOh.
- Gnome Minosaur (ノームマイナソー, Nōmu Mainasō): A Minosaur with burrowing capabilities and the ability to shoot missiles from its head. Kleon created it from overprotective mother Kyōko Taniguchi (谷口 京子, Taniguchi Kyōko) before it is destroyed by King KishiryuOh.
- Charybdis Minosaur (カリブディスマイナソー, Karibudisu Mainasō): A hydrokinetic Minosaur capable of summoning and bending water as well as storing it in a water tank on top of its head. Kleon created it from Gachireus, who wanted to prove himself to Pricious, before it is destroyed by Max Ryusoul Red and Noblesse Ryusoul Gold.
- Wizard Minosaur (ウィザードマイナソー, Wizādo Mainasō): A Minosaur capable of performing magic and wields a staff in battle. Kleon created it from an unnamed magician before it is destroyed by Noblesse Ryusoul Gold.
- Satan Minosaurs (サタンマイナソー, Satan Mainasō): A series of Minosaurs capable of transforming into mist and using this form to place people in their worst nightmares so it can absorb their fear. The first Satan Minosaur was created by Kleon from a cursed mirror that reflected fear before it is destroyed by King KishiryuOh. Kleon later creates a second Satan Minosaur from Melto while he and the Ryusoulgers were trapped in Eras' dream world, using the Minosaur to break them free before Eras destroys it.
- Phantom Minosaur (ファントムマイナソー, Fantomu Mainasō): A Minosaur that wields a pen-like staff. Kleon created it from playwright Tamada (玉田), who wanted to write a best-selling play, before it is destroyed by KishiryuOh Five Knights Black and KishiryuNeptune.

===== Other Minosaurs =====
- Progenitor Minosaur (始祖マイナソー, Shiso Mainasō): An ancient Minosaur with time-traveling capabilities created from Yuno, daughter of Valma and member of the ancient Ryusoul Tribe, before it is destroyed by KishiryuOh Five Knights. This Minosaur appears exclusively in the film Kishiryu Sentai Ryusoulger the Movie: Time Slip! Dinosaur Panic.
- Griffin Minosaur (グリフォンマイナソー, Gurifon Mainasō): A flying Minosaur that Kleon created from Ganima Noshiagalda, a remnant of Gangler who wanted to be freed from his confinement. It is destroyed along with the host by the Ryusoulgers, Lupinrangers, and Patrangers. The Griffin Minosaur appears exclusively in the crossover film Kishiryu Sentai Ryusoulger VS Lupinranger VS Patranger the Movie.
- Maiko Minosaur (マイコマイナソー, Maiko Mainasō): A humanoid Minosaur capable of negating the Ryusoulgers' transformations. Kleon created it from a young woman named Maiko (マイコ) before it fades away when Nada's GaiSoul absorbs its negative emotions. The Maiko Minosaur appears exclusively in the film Kishiryu Sentai Ryusoulger Special: Memory of Soulmates and is portrayed by Kanon Miyahara (宮原 華音, Miyahara Kanon), who also portrays its host.
- Kantoku Minosaurs (カントクマイナソー, Kantoku Mainasō): Four atypical Minosaurs that consist of the Jidaigeki Kantoku Minosaur (時代劇カントクマイナソー, Jidaigeki Kantoku Mainasō), the Ladies Kantoku Minosaur (レディースカントクマイナソー, Kantoku Mainasō), the Action Kantoku Minosaur (アクションカントクマイナソー, Akushon Kantoku Mainasō), and the Gamble Kantoku Minosaur (ギャンブルカントクマイナソー, Gyanburu Kantoku Mainasō). Unlike most of the other Minosaurs, Kleon accidentally created them when Yodonheim member Movie Jamen, who wanted to make ideal films, drank his slime. After fusing with Movie Jamen to become the Movie Minosaur (ムービーマイナソー, Mūbī Mainasō), the Kantoku Minosaurs are destroyed by Kiramaizin and KishiryuOh Five Knights. The Kantoku Minosaurs appear exclusively in the crossover film Mashin Sentai Kiramager vs. Ryusoulger and are voiced by Yū Mizushima (水島 裕, Mizushima Yū).
- Unnamed Minosaur: A Minosaur who wields a sword and created from Nire that becomes the Minosaur Complete Body that appears in episode 1 of the television series. The unnamed Minosaur appears exclusively in the web-exclusive series Kishiryu Sentai Ryusoulger: The Legacy of the Master's Soul.

=== Tatsui Family ===
==== Ui Tatsui ====
Ui Tatsui (龍井 うい, Tatsui Ui) is a vlogger who lied about visiting far off locations on her videos while helping her father find evidence of the Ryusoul Tribe's existence, encountering the Ryusoulgers as a result and offering her family's home to them. After being exposed to Kleon's slime, Ui became the Medusa Minosaur's host before she is saved when the monster is destroyed by KishiryuOh Three Knights.

Ui Tatsui is portrayed by Mana Kinjo (金城 茉奈, Kinjō Mana).

==== Naohisa Tatsui ====
Naohisa Tatsui (龍井 尚久, Tatsui Naohisa) is Ui's father, a paleontologist who learned of the existence of both the Kishiryu and the Ryusoul Tribe and sought scientific proof, offering the Ryusoulgers use of his laboratory as their base. He later becomes Seto's vessel so the spirit can help the Ryusoulgers.

Naohisa Tatsui is portrayed by Mitsuru Fukikoshi (吹越 満, Fukikoshi Mitsuru).

=== Gaisoulg ===
Gaisoulg (ガイソーグ, Gaisōgu) is a violet-colored animated suit of armor that was created by the ancient Ryusoul Tribesman Valma during his people's war with the Druidon. However, it was sealed away when it attained sentience after absorbing an excessive amount of hatred and developed an insatiable craving for a strong opponent to battle and possess. Five centuries before the events of the series, Gaisoulg was unsealed by Master Green when he was forced to wear the armor in order to fend off a Druidon attack. Master Green then left the planet for deep space to protect everyone, though Gaisoulg outlived its host and sought out new suitable hosts across the cosmos before the events of Super Sentai Strongest Battle, targeting Super Sentai warriors before being willingly worn by the sorceress Rita so she can destroy the Super Sentai. After she is defeated, the armor ends up in the possession of Nada, who proceeds to challenge both the Ryusoulgers and the Druidon. The Ryusoulgers eventually expel the hatred that maintained Gaisoulg, purifying it so Nada can use it to help the Ryusoulgers. After Nada sacrifices himself to save Koh, the Gaisoulg armor transforms into the Max Ryusoul Changer, which allows Koh to become Max Ryusoul Red.

In battle, the wearer of the armor wields a dark copy of the Ryusoul Ken called the Gaisoul Ken (ガイソーケン, Gaisō Ken; Gaisoul Sword), which allows them to perform the Ancient Break Edge (エンシェントブレイクエッジ, Enshento Bureiku Ejji) finisher, and a shield. The armor also enables its current wearer to see the memories of its past wearers.

Regardless of the wearer, Gaisoulg is voiced by Tomokazu Seki (関 智一, Seki Tomokazu).

==== Nada ====
Nada (ナダ) is a former squire of Master Red's who left the Ryusoul Tribe's village after Koh was chosen to become Ryusoul Red and developed a rivalry with him. Upon eventually learning of the Druidons' return, Nada offers his help to the Ryusoulgers by leading them to Pachygaroo and Chibigaroo. After the Ryusoulgers discover his use of the Gaisoulg armor and purify it of the hatred that made it sentient, Nada attains full control of it and joins them as their seventh member, with the title of the "Indomitable Knight" (不屈の騎士, Fukutsu no Kishi). Though he dies fighting Uden, his spirit becomes the Max RyuSoul, which Koh uses to avenge him.

Nada is portrayed by Seiya Osada (長田 成哉, Osada Seiya).

== Guest characters ==
- Yuno (ユノ): An ancient Ryusoul Tribeswoman, Valma's daughter, and the Progenitor Minosaur's host. A remnant of her consciousness remains at the Sky Temple, guarding the Ryusoul Calibur until Koh and Canalo retrieve it. Yuno is portrayed by Rie Kitahara (北原 里英, Kitahara Rie).

== Spin-off characters ==
- Valma (ヴァルマ, Varuma): An ancient Ryusoul Tribesman from the Mesozoic Era who created and used the Gaisoulg armor to battle the Druidon Tribe before becoming fascinated with the notion of using his powers for world domination. He also created the first Kishiryu, Dinomigo, a prototype of Tyramigo. Valma is portrayed by Shirō Sano (佐野 史郎, Sano Shirō).
- Asanuma (浅沼): A scientist and friend of Naohisa Tatsui who appears exclusively in Kishiryu Sentai Ryusoulger: Final Live Tour 2020, a cancelled stage show that was later adapted into a drama CD and web manga. After receiving a sample of Towa's blood while he was infected by the Cerberus Minosaur's poison, Asanuma began studying the Ryusoul and Druidon Tribes before injecting himself with a mixture of both tribes' DNA. Upon mutating into a Ryusoulger-like entity known as Ryusoul Moria (リュウソウモーリア, Ryūsō Mōria), he decides to use his newfound power in a bid to obtain for godhood and immortality. To prevent the Ryusoulgers from getting in his way, Asanuma uses his cloning technology to duplicate the deceased Druidon generals and brainwashes Pricious to his aid. In the drama CD adaptation, Ryusoul Moria is voiced by Tomokazu Seki.
- Nire (ニレ): A senior apprentice of Master Red's who seeks for the KanaeSoul to resurrect Hiiragi (ヒイラギ), the two apprentices' master and the previous Ryusoul Red, after killing him to end a Minosaur created from him. When a Minosaur created from him reaches its Complete Body form, Nire dies. He appears exclusively in the web-exclusive series Kishiryu Sentai Ryusoulger: The Legacy of the Master's Soul. Nire is portrayed by Kenji Matsuda (松田 賢二, Matsuda Kenji).
- Isuka (イスカ): An apprentice of Master Pink's who appears exclusively in the web-exclusive series Kishiryu Sentai Ryusoulger: The Legacy of the Master's Soul. Isuka is portrayed by Kanon Hanakage (花影 香音, Hanakage Kanon).
- Mayu (マユ): A former apprentice of Master Blue's who currently researches the RyuSouls and appears exclusively in the web-exclusive series Kishiryu Sentai Ryusoulger: The Legacy of the Master's Soul. Mayu is portrayed by Karen Miyazaki (宮崎 香蓮, Miyazaki Karen).
- Hana (ハナ): A girl who holds a grudge against Master Red for causing the death of her father, Hiiragi, and appears exclusively in the web-exclusive series Kishiryu Sentai Ryusoulger: The Legacy of the Master's Soul. Hana is portrayed by Ren Komai (駒井 蓮, Komai Ren).
