= List of Mashin Sentai Kiramager characters =

Mashin Sentai Kiramager (魔進戦隊キラメイジャー, Mashin Sentai Kirameijā) is a Japanese tokusatsu series that serves as the 44th installment in the Super Sentai franchise and the first entry in the Reiwa era. Much of the series takes inspiration from Arabian, Islamic, Persian, Egyptian, Turkic, Hindu, and Norse mythology.

== Main characters ==
=== Kiramagers ===
The main cast of Mashin Sentai Kiramager. From left to right: Mabushina, Shiguru Oshikiri, Sayo Oharu, Juru Atsuta, Sena Hayami, Tametomo Imizu, and Muryo Hakataminami.

The eponymous Kiramagers are five individuals who fight using the power of the Kiramai Stones. As a cover for their mission of protecting Earth, they became CARAT fashion models to gain popularity so people will believe in the existence of the Kiramagers. They are later joined by a treasure hunter who is the adopted son of Crystaria's royal family.

Each primary member carries a tire-like Kiramai Changer (キラメイチェンジャー, Kiramei Chenjā) bracelet as their transformation device along with a Kiramai Shot (キラメイショット, Kiramei Shotto) handgun and a Kiramai Sword (キラメイソード, Kiramei Sōdo), which can combine to form the Kiramai Buster (キラメイバスター, Kiramei Basutā) rifle, as their sidearms. They can also use a Substitute'n (代役ン, Daiyaku-n) crystal doll, which is made from Mabushina's Blue Diamond (ブルーダイヤ, Burū Daiya) tears, to create a copy of one member for them to be in two places at once.

The Kiramagers later acquire the Kiraful Go Arrow (キラフルゴーアロー, Kirafuru Gō Arō) bow, which allows the primary members to become the armored Go Kiramagers (ゴーキラメイジャー, Gō Kirameijā). However, they can only assume these forms for 100 seconds.

==== Juru Atsuta ====
Juru Atsuta (熱田 充瑠, Atsuta Jūru) is an artistic student of Hikarigamine High School (光ヶ峰高等学校, Hikarigamine Kōtō Gakkō) who loves to draw and is the youngest member of the team. Despite also being the newest member, he is appointed the leader as he was chosen by the strongest Kiramai Stone, much to his initial dismay before he eventually settles into the role. Due in part to his love of drawing, he gains the Kiramental (キラメンタル, Kiramentaru) ability to create virtually anything after joining CARAT, such as reformatting the Kiramai Stones into the Kiramai Mashin and granting them the ability to combine. Before Mabushina recruited him and during his time as a Kiramager, Juru experiences visions of Crystaria and Yodonheim and was visited by Oradin's spirit in his dreams. Near the end of the series, Oradin reveals that these and Juru's Kiramental were a result of him being the chosen hero of Crystaria, taking Galza's place after he was corrupted by Emperor Yodon's influence.

Juru can transform into Kiramai Red (キラメイレッド, Kiramei Reddo). While transformed, he primarily wields the Kiramai Sword and Shot.

Juru Atsuta is portrayed by Rio Komiya (小宮 璃央, Komiya Rio). As a child, Juru is portrayed by Shigetora Takahashi (高橋 成虎, Takahashi Shigetora).

==== Tametomo Imizu ====
Tametomo Imizu (射水 為朝, Imizu Tametomo) is an esports professional who excels in long range combat. He acts as an older brother figure and provides assistance when needed. However, he is also a selfish egotist, seeing himself as the Kiramagers' "ace" even when the others disagree. After Juru fails to recognize him, Tametomo develops an antagonistic relationship with him, questioning his every move and talking back to him every so often. This came to a head when a jealous Shovellow convinces Tametomo to take Juru's position away from him, only to get suspended for botching a mission. Though he quits out of anger, the girls help Tametomo realize he never wanted the leadership role anyway and that Juru was always more qualified in the first place. Once he reconciles with the others, Muryo names Tametomo second-in-command of the Kiramagers and grants him the authority to lead should anything happen to Juru.

Tametomo can transform into Kiramai Yellow (キラメイイエロー, Kiramei Ierō). While transformed, he primarily wields the Kiramai Shot.

Tametomo Imizu is portrayed by Rui Kihara (木原 瑠生, Kihara Rui). As a child, Tametomo is portrayed by Yūsuke Kamio (神尾 優典, Kamio Yūsuke).

==== Sena Hayami ====
Sena Hayami (速見 瀬奈, Hayami Sena) is a famous track and field athlete who excels in high-speed combat tactics. She occasionally causes trouble for everyone around her with her impulsive personality. As a naturally gifted speedster, Sena was once a “Supersonic Princess” of karuta before pursuing her dream as a full-time track and field athlete. She initially distrusts Juru and refuses to accept him as her leader, believing he is selfish. However, after seeing the lengths he went to help her with her career, she grows to accept him and become protective of him.

Sena can transform into Kiramai Green (キラメイグリーン, Kiramei Gurīn). While transformed, she primarily wields the Kiramai Sword.

Sena Hayami is portrayed by Yume Shinjo (新庄 由芽, Shinjō Yume). As a child, Sena is portrayed by Yuzuki Nakamura (中村 優月, Nakamura Yuzuki).

==== Shiguru Oshikiri ====
Shiguru Oshikiri (押切 時雨, Oshikiri Shiguru) is a 24-year-old professional stunt actor who excels in swordsmanship. Despite being a popular stuntman, most of his fans are annoyed by his doll-like personality as he rarely shows emotion outside of acting. While he likes to maintain an air of stoicism and coldness, he only does so to contain his true feelings and not be a burden to everyone around him as he believes a hero should suffer in silence. After Juru learns his secret, Shiguru learns to be more open about his feelings and become a trusted friend to Juru.

Shiguru can transform into Kiramai Blue (キラメイブルー, Kiramei Burū). While transformed, he primarily wields the Kiramai Sword, which allows him to perform the Blue Bright Slash (ブルーブライトスラッシュ, Burū Buraito Surasshu) attack.

Shiguru Oshikiri is portrayed by Atomu Mizuishi (水石 亜飛夢, Mizuishi Atomu).

==== Sayo Oharu ====
Sayo Oharu (大治 小夜, Ōharu Sayo) is a talented surgeon who excels in aikido and serves as the team's healer. She has an interest in fashion and beauty and always wanted to become a CARAT model. She also displays a dislike of bullies, using her martial arts skills to scare off any who cross her path. However, Sayo is easily distracted by beautiful things such as jewels and flowers, which can detract from important duties unless someone pulls her away.

Sayo can transform into Kiramai Pink (キラメイピンク, Kiramei Pinku). While transformed, she primarily wields the Kiramai Shot.

Sayo Oharu is portrayed by Mio Kudo (工藤 美桜, Kudō Mio). As a child, Sayo is portrayed by Halo Asada (浅田 芭路, Asada Haro).

==== Takamichi Crystaria ====
Takamichi Crystaria (クリスタリア 宝路, Kurisutaria Takamichi) is a 47-year-old treasure hunter, the long-lost biological older brother of Muryo, and the adopted son of Oradin with a highly positive attitude. Three decades prior, a teenage Takamichi Hakataminami (博多南 宝路, Hakataminami Takamichi) was introduced to Oradin and befriended him. During an expedition with the Crystarian, a Monstone lodged itself in Takamichi's body. To save him, Oradin revived him as a human-Crystarian hybrid, which slowed down his body's aging process. Following this, Oradin took him to Crystaria and adopted him. After battling Numajo alongside his foster family and apparently losing his foster mother, Mabayuine, Takamichi began to fear for Mabushina's life, so Galza suggested he leave his foster family to search for the four Kanaema Stones (カナエマストーン, Kanaema Sutōn) in order to save her, unaware that it was a ploy for him to leave Crystaria vulnerable to Yodonheim's invasion. When he met the Kiramagers and reunited with Mabushina and Muryo, Takamichi learns of what happened and eventually joins them in fighting Yodonheim. After Mabushina is healed from Numajo's curse, Takamichi continues searching for the Kanaema Stones so he can use their powers to restore Crystaria instead. During his quest, Galza uses Takamichi's Monstone to manipulate him into fighting his allies until Juru extracts it and frees him from Galza's control. After defeating Emperor Yodon, Takamichi and Mabushina return to Crystaria and use the Kanaema Stones to restore it to its former glory. He also erects a mountain monument to his Kiramager teammates in their honor.

Unlike the primary Kiramagers, Takamichi utilizes the globe-like Shiny Kiramai Changer (シャイニーキラメイチェンジャー, Shainī Kiramei Chenjā) bracelet to transform into Kiramai Silver (キラメイシルバー, Kiramei Shirubā). He also wields the Shiny Breaker (シャイニーブレイカー, Shainī Bureikā) jackhammer, which has a Drill Mode (ドリルモード, Doriru Mōdo) that can be used as either a firearm or a tonfa, as well as perform the Shining Beam Attack (シャイニングビームアタック, Shainingu Bīmu Atakku) finisher, and a Hyper Arm Mode (ハイパーアームモード, Haipā Āmu Mōdo) that can be used as a reach extender. During the events of the stage show Mashin Sentai Kiramager: Final Live Tour 2021, Takamichi is able to use the Kiraful Go Arrow to assume his own Go Kiramager form.

While under Galza's influence, Takamichi utilized a dark copy of the Shiny Kiramai Changer called the Yodon Changer (ヨドンチェンジャー, Yodon Chenjā) to transform into Dark Kiramai Silver (ダークキラメイシルバー, Dāku Kiramei Shirubā).

Takamichi Crystaria is portrayed by Kohei Shoji (庄司 浩平, Shōji Kōhei).

=== Kiramai Mashin ===
The Kiramai Mashin (キラメイ魔進, Kiramei Mashin) are the sentient Kiramai Stones (キラメイストーン, Kiramei Sutōn), which Mabushina brought over from Crystaria, who serve as the Kiramagers' partners. Through the power of Juru's Kiramental, the Kiramai Stones are able to transform from their jewel forms into their vehicle-themed mecha forms and combine with each other via Mashin Combination (魔進合体, Mashin Gattai). The five main Kiramai Mashin can also perform the Kiramai Stone Bomber (キラメイストーンボンバー, Kiramei Sutōn Bonbā) attack.

- Mashin Fire (魔進ファイヤ, Mashin Faiya): Kiramai Red's personal fire engine-themed Kiramai Mashin, initially the Red Kiramai Stone (レッドキラメイストーン, Reddo Kiramei Sutōn), equipped with the Fire Ladder (ファイヤーラダー, Faiyā Radā) turntable ladder/water cannon hybrid that forms the body, right arm, and legs of Kiramaizin and Land Mage. He can also transform into Mashin Makka (魔進マッカ), a supercar-themed pyrokinetic Kiramai Mashin with a resemblance to Mach. While he comes off as angry and brusque, Fire primarily displays a passionate personality when it comes to battle. Fire is voiced by Kenichi Suzumura (鈴村 健一, Suzumura Ken'ichi).
- Mashin Shovellow (魔進ショベロー, Mashin Shoberō): Kiramai Yellow's personal excavator-themed Kiramai Mashin, initially the Yellow Kiramai Stone (イエローキラメイストーン, Ierō Kiramei Sutōn), equipped with the Shovellow Boom (ショベローブーム, Shoberō Būmu) excavator arm that forms the left arm of Kiramaizin and Land Mage. Due to his old man-like personality, Shovellow has a tendency to openly disagree with anything he does not like. Interestingly enough, Tametomo finds him reminiscent of his late grandfather. On one occasion, Juru used his Kiramental to fuse the Yellow Kiramai Stone and a Kiramai Sword into the Yellow Stone Hammer (イエローストーンハンマー, Ierō Sutōn Hanmā) for Tametomo to wield. Shovellow is voiced by Mitsuo Iwata (岩田 光央, Iwata Mitsuo).
- Mashin Mach (魔進マッハ, Mashin Mahha): Kiramai Green's personal supercar-themed Kiramai Mashin, initially the Green Kiramai Stone (グリーンキラメイストーン, Gurīn Kiramei Sutōn), equipped with a pair of Mach Flash (マッハフラッシュ, Mahha Furasshu) headlights that forms the head and right shoulder pad of Kiramaizin and Land Mage. Like Fire, he can also transform into Makka while being used as part of Land Mage to perform the Kiramai Burning (キラメイバーニング, Kiramei Bāningu) attack. He comes off as a charming womanizer, much to Sena and Sayo's annoyance. Mach is voiced by Kenji Akabane (赤羽根 健治, Akabane Kenji).
- Mashin Jetter (魔進ジェッタ, Mashin Jetta): Kiramai Blue's personal jet aircraft-themed Kiramai Mashin, initially the Blue Kiramai Stone (ブルーキラメイストーン, Burū Kiramei Sutōn), equipped with the Jetter Sword (ジェッタソード, Jetta Sōdo) blade that forms the sword of Kiramaizin and the legs of Sky Mage. In contrast to his partner, Jetter is excitable and eccentric in personality, though he is much more responsible. He also views his partner as his "older brother" and acts as his hype man. Jetter is voiced by Genki Okawa (大河 元気, Ōkawa Genki).
- Mashin Helico (魔進ヘリコ, Mashin Heriko): Kiramai Pink's personal helicopter-themed Kiramai Mashin, initially the Pink Kiramai Stone (ピンクキラメイストーン, Pinku Kiramei Sutōn), equipped with a pair of Helico Rotor (ヘリコローター, Heriko Rōtā) blades that forms the chest plate of Kiramaizin and the upper half of Sky Mage. She holds her partner to a high regard and constantly compliments Sayo on her appearance. Helico is voiced by Yuki Nagaku (長久 友紀, Nagaku Yuki).
- Mashin Drijan (魔進ドリジャン, Mashin Dorijan): Kiramai Silver's personal drilling vehicle-themed Kiramai Mashin equipped with six crawler tracks, three drills, and two grabber arms that was created by CARAT for underground excavation. Unlike the other Kiramai Mashin, Drijan lacks a stone mode as it has a separate Kiramai Stone as its core and speaks in computerized beeps while the others speak clear human language. Before gaining the power to become Gigant Driller, it was named Super Heavy Machine Drijan (超重機ドリジャン, Chōjūki Dorijan).
- Mashin Jouki (魔進ジョーキー, Mashin Jōkī): A steam locomotive-themed Kiramai Mashin, initially the Black Kiramai Stone (ブラックキラメイストーン, Burakku Kiramei Sutōn), that can transform into a dinosaur-themed mecha called Smog Jouki (スモッグジョーキー, Sumoggu Jōkī) and forms the limbs of King Express. It originally served as Crystaria's royal train before Galza corrupted and used it as part of Yodonheim's invasion of Earth. With Galza piloting it in both of its modes, Jouki is equipped with a pair of Jouki Jaws (ジョーキージョー, Jōkī Jō) and the Jouki Chainsaw (ジョーキーチェーンソー, Jōkī Chēnsō). As Smog Jouki, it can perform the Burn Blacker (バーンブラッカー, Bān Burakkā) finisher. After he was executed by Emperor Yodon, Galza used his remaining life force to reactivate Jouki and save Juru, entrusting the boy with his Kiramai Mashin before departing to the afterlife.
- Mashin Express (魔進エクスプレス, Mashin Ekusupuresu): A two-in-one Shinkansen-themed Kiramai Mashin, initially the White Kiramai Stone (ホワイトキラメイストーン, Howaito Kiramei Sutōn), consisting of Ex (エクス, Ekusu) and Press (プレス, Puresu) that possesses the ability to temporarily override Galza's control of Mashin Jouki and forms the head and torso of King Express (Zabyun). Despite being sentient, neither Ex nor Press speak the human language.
- Mashin Zabyun (魔進ザビューン, Mashin Zabyūn): A Shinkansen/shark-themed Kiramai Mashin, initially the Aqua Kiramai Stone (アクアキラメイストーン, Akua Kiramei Sutōn), that possesses purification capabilities, can split into multiple weapons for the Kiramagers' Mashin Giants to use, and forms the mask and limbs of King Express Zabyun. Zabyun is voiced by Hiroyuki Yoshino (吉野 裕行, Yoshino Hiroyuki).
- Mashin Hakobu (魔進ハコブー, Mashin Hakobū): A wide-body aircraft-themed Kiramai Mashin, initially the Gold Kiramai Stone (ゴールドキラメイストーン, Gōrudo Kiramei Sutōn), that forms the main body, wings, and head casing of Grateful Phoenix. He can also combine with the five main Kiramai Mashin to assume Cargo Mode (カーゴモード, Kāgo Mōdo). He was Oradin's caretaker and teacher who was vacationing on Earth when Crystaria was attacked by Yodonheim and became inconsolable due to the king's death until Shiguru's acting made him cry, leading to him joining the Kiramagers. Hakobu is voiced by Tetsu Inada (稲田 徹, Inada Tetsu)
- Mashin Oradin (魔進オラディン): A phoenix-themed Kiramai Mashin, initially the Sky Kiramai Stone (スカイキラメイストーン, Sukai Kiramei Sutōn), created from Oradin's soul fusing with the Miracle Stone (ミラクルストーン, Mirakuru Sutōn) that forms the chest plate and head of Grateful Phoenix.

==== Mashin Weapons ====
The Mashin Weapons (魔進ウエポン, Mashin Uepon) are smaller Kiramai Mashin created from auxiliary Kiramai Stones that the Kiramagers obtain during their adventures and can change into weapons for their Mashin Giants to use in battle.

- Mashin Lifton (魔進リフトン, Mashin Rifuton): A forklift-themed Kiramai Mashin, initially the Emerald Kiramai Stone (エメラルドキラメイストーン, Emerarudo Kiramei Sutōn), that can transform into a giant trident. Lifton is voiced by Yuuki Anai (穴井 勇輝, Anai Yūki).
- Mashin Rolland (魔進ローランド, Mashin Rōrando): A road roller-themed Kiramai Mashin, initially the Orange Kiramai Stone (オレンジキラメイストーン, Orenji Kiramei Sutōn), that can transform into a giant hammer. Rollerand is voiced by Kazuki Komine (小峰 一己, Komine Kazuki).
- Mashin Carry (魔進キャリー, Mashin Kyarī): A truck-themed Kiramai Mashin, initially the Purple Kiramai Stone (パープルキラメイストーン, Pāpuru Kiramei Sutōn), that can transform into a giant shield. Carry is voiced by Ayaka Maekawa (前川 綾香, Maekawa Ayaka).
- Mashin Duston (魔進ダストン, Mashin Dasuton): A garbage truck-themed Kiramai Mashin, initially the Navy Kiramai Stone (ネイビーキラメイストーン, Neibī Kiramei Sutōn), that can transform into a giant vacuum cleaner. Duston is voiced by Keisuke Yamamori (山森 圭介, Yamamori Keisuke).
- Mashin Magellan (魔進マゼラン, Mashin Mazeran): A concrete mixer truck-themed Kiramai Mashin, initially the Lime Kiramai Stone (ライムキラメイストーン, Raimu Kiramei Sutōn), that can transform into a giant raygun. Magellan is voiced by Takanobu Shimazu (島津 孝暢, Shimazu Takanobu).

==== Mashin Giants ====
The Mashin Giants (魔進巨人, Mashin Kyojin) are giant robots formed from the Kiramai Mashin through either Mashin Combination (魔進合体, Mashin Gattai) or Mashin Transformation (魔進変形, Mashin Henkei).

- Kiramaizin (キラメイジン, Kirameijin): The Kiramagers' first Mashin Giant, also known as the "Sparkling Giant" (煌輝の巨神, Kirameki no Kyoshin), composed of the five main Kiramai Mashin. Its finisher is the Kiramai Dynamic (キラメイダイナミック, Kiramei Dainamikku).
  - Land Mage (ランドメイジ, Rando Meiji): A combination of Mashin Fire, Shovellow, and Mach. Its finisher is the Land Round Smash (ランドラウンドスマッシュ, Rando Raundo Sumasshu).
  - Sky Mage (スカイメイジ, Sukai Meiji): A combination of Mashin Jetter and Helico.
- King Express (キングエクスプレス, Kingu Ekusupuresu): The Kiramagers' second Mashin Giant, also known as the "Sonic Giant" (音速の巨神, Onsoku no Kyoshin), composed of Mashin Express and Jouki. Its finisher is the King Express Burn Plaster (キングエクスプレスバーンプラスター, Kingu Ekusupuresu Bān Purasutā). While in control of Mashin Jouki, Galza could hinder the Kiramagers' ability to use King Express by either taking control of and forcibly separating the Mashin Giant or denying them his Kiramai Mashin outright if he so chooses.
  - King Express Zabyun (キングエクスプレスザビューン, Kingu Ekusupuresu Zabyūn): A variation of King Express that replaces Mashin Jouki with Mashin Zabyun. Its finisher is the Zabyun Megalo Blaster (ザビューンメガロブラスター, Zabyūn Megaro Burasutā). In the film Mashin Sentai Kiramager the Movie: Be-Bop Dream, Juru combines his Kiramental with the Dream Stone's power to reform King Express Zabyun into the double-barreled Dream Jumbo Victory Bazooka (ドリームジャンボビクトリーバズーカ, Dorīmu Janbo Bikutorī Bazūka), allowing Kiramaizin and Gigant Driller to perform the Kiramai Dream Come True Cannon (キラメイドリームカムトゥルーキャノン, Kiramei Dorīmu Kamu Turū Kyanon) finisher.
  - Jaaku King Express (邪悪キングエクスプレス, Jaaku Kingu Ekusupuresu): A red-eyed version of King Express formed when Galza gains the ability to forcibly combine Mashin Express and Jouki, allowing him to assume direct control of the Mashin Giant. Its finisher is the Burn Dead End (バーンデッドエンド, Bān Deddo Endo).
- Gigant Driller (ギガントドリラー, Giganto Dorirā): Kiramai Silver's personal Mashin Giant, also known as the "Strong Giant" (剛力の巨神, Gōriki no Kyoshin), composed of his Shining Kiramai Stone (シャイニングキラメイストーン, Shainingu Kiramei Sutōn) form and Mashin Drijan. Its finisher is the Gigant Crash (ギガントクラッシュ, Giganto Kurasshu).
- Grateful Phoenix (グレイトフルフェニックス, Gureitofuru Fenikkusu): The Kiramagers' third Mashin Giant, also known as the "Winged Giant" (飛翼の巨神, Hiyoku no Kyoshin), composed of Mashin Oradin and Hakobu that dual wields the twin Golden Axes (ゴールデンアックス, Gōruden Akkusu), which can combine into the double-bladed Golden Halberd (ゴールデンハルバード, Gōruden Harubādo). Its finisher is the Grateful Prominence (グレイトフルプロミネンス, Gureitofuru Purominensu).

== Recurring characters ==
=== Yodonheim ===
The Dark Empire Yodonheim (闇の帝国ヨドンヘイム, Yami no Teikoku Yodonheimu) is an evil empire of dark beings under the command of Emperor Yodon that conquered Crystaria with their Yodon Army (ヨドン軍, Yodon-gun) invasion force before setting their sights on Earth. Their main objective is to destroy everything that is beautiful in the universe. After Emperor Yodon's death, Carantula reorganizes Yodonheim and maintains a good relationship with Earth and Crystaria.

==== Emperor Yodon ====
Emperor Yodon (ヨドン皇帝, Yodon-kōtei) is the mysterious leader of Yodonheim who possesses two additional personalities. He was originally a conglomerate of serpents born from the embodiment of corruption who rose to power after creating his own Jamen and devouring his defeated opponents, assimilating their powers while increasing in size. Yodon subconsciously created Yodonna and Shadon to use them as protective guises so he can safely travel to other worlds not consumed in darkness. Years prior to the series, he corrupted a young Galza into resenting his kingdom, which eventually led to Crystaria's destruction and Oradin's defeat.

Initially acting from the shadows, Yodon came to Earth as Yodonna to assist his generals in invading Earth before eventually revealing himself. Sometime after Shadon's destruction, Yodon absorbs Galza as a replacement and is seemingly killed by his traitorous general. However, the emperor drops the ruse after Juru reveals the existence of the Kanaema Stones and proceeds to invade Earth to hunt the artifacts and reshape the entire universe to his liking. After being tricked into removing his Jamen, Yodon is ultimately destroyed by a fatal shot to his exposed head from Juru's Kiraful Go Arrow finisher enhanced by the Destoria (デストリア, Desutoria) Kanaema Stone.

Yodon's other selves are represented by a pair of masks, each of which hang off his Jamen and covers his main mask when he takes on their appearance. As his alternate personalities are separate beings unto their own, Yodon can communicate with them through their Yodon Changers. On his own, Emperor Yodon is capable of unleashing a mass of darkness from his body and laying waste to several city blocks. As a conglomerate of darkness, Yodon is incapable of sustaining himself in pristine and beautiful areas without switching to one of his alternate personalities. He can also summon an army of Emperor Guard Bechats to aid him in battle.

Emperor Yodon is voiced by Kazuhiro Yamaji (山路 和弘, Yamaji Kazuhiro).

=== Yodonna ===
Yodonna (ヨドンナ) is an alternate personality of Emperor Yodon who initially believed herself to be his private secretary. She arrives on Earth to support Galza and Carantula due to the Kiramagers' interference in their invasion plans. While Yodonna maintains her loyalty to Yodon, he executes her after she becomes a liability in his fight against the Kiramagers, embracing her demise if it meant Yodon would be victorious.

In her titular web-exclusive series, Yodonna ends up in the Yodon afterlife to await judgment. However, she steals a revival device and returns to Earth in the hopes of possessing the Kiramagers' leader Juru Atsuta and use his life force to revive herself, only to accidentally end up in the body of his girlfriend, Mizuki Kakihara. Yodonna settles for this development, but is forced to protect Kakihara from yakuza members that the latter's detective brother was investigating. In the process, Yodonna befriends Kakihara and they help each other learn emotions and work on her attitude respectively. As a result of their friendship, Yodonna only siphons enough energy from Kakihara to temporarily sustain her physical form, destroy the revival device, and save Kakihara from yakuza leader, Hideki Kujirasaki. Afterward, Yodonna returns to the Yodon afterlife, but realizes she can revive herself if she learns to love. While she is tricked by Hanidora in an attempt to revive Emperor Yodon, Yodonna eventually succeeds at reviving herself.

She can transform from her human form to her Yodonheim uniform using the Yodon Changer. She also wields the Akkanben (悪漢鞭; Villain Whip) riding crop that can enhance Yodonheim members at great cost to them or divide whomever she hits into five duplicates of themselves, each of which embody a different personality trait and can merge back at their leisure. In her titular web-exclusive series, she gains access to a new, more powerful battle form called Yodonna Burst (ヨドンナ・バースト, Yodonna Bāsuto).

Yodonna is portrayed by Nashiko Momotsuki (桃月 なしこ, Momotsuki Nashiko).

=== Shadon ===
Shadon (シャドン) is an alternate personality of Emperor Yodon's who believes himself to be a hunter and his direct messenger. He wields the Croco Rifle (クロコライフル, Kuroko Raifuru) sniper rifle and, like Yodonna, is equipped with a Yodon Changer. He is destroyed by Go Kiramai Yellow.

Shadon is voiced by Takaya Kuroda (黒田 崇矢, Kuroda Takaya).

==== Galza ====
Galza (ガルザ, Garuza), also known as the "Treacherous Demon General" (裏切りの鬼将軍, Uragiri no Oni-shōgun), is a fierce, aggressive Crystarian general who wields the Crush End (クラッシュエンド, Kurasshu Endo) hook sword. He is Oradin's younger brother, Mabushina's biological uncle, and Takamichi's foster uncle.

Once an idealistic young Crystarian and one of the chosen heroes of his home planet, Galza's mind was corrupted from an early age by Emperor Yodon, causing the former to resent Oradin and everything he cherishes as well as have no memory of his encounter with Yodon. As an adult, Galza believed himself more worthy of becoming king than Oradin due to his stronger Kiramental, with the resulting jealousy and resentment over being denied the throne driving him to side with Yodonheim. He subsequently became general of the Yodon Army, overseeing the attack on Crystaria before tracking Mabushina to Earth. Amidst his battles with the Kiramagers, Galza develops a rivalry with Juru after seeing similarities between him and Oradin as well as cultivate a dark power similar to Kiramental fueled by his negative emotions; which Carantula later calls "Jamental" (ジャメンタル, Jamentaru). Following Oradin's revival as Mashin Oradin, Galza hones his Jamental further to compete with his brother's growing powers, obtaining the ability to brainwash the Kiramagers' Mashin into his service.

After Shadon is killed in battle, Galza offers himself to Yodon as a replacement personality in a scheme to take over the latter's body, transforming himself into the more powerful Lord Galza (ロードガルザ, Rōdo Garuza), who wields the Gold Chainsword (ゴルドチェーンソード, Gorudo Chēnsōdo). When Juru breaks into Yodonheim and reveals the Crystarian's forgotten past, Galza realizes he had been manipulated and attempts to atone for his misdeeds, only for Yodon to remove Galza and fatally wound him. Despite this, Galza uses the last of his life force to save Juru, entrusting him with Mashin Jouki before making peace with Oradin and departing to the afterlife.

Galza is voiced by Yuichi Nakamura (中村 悠一, Nakamura Yūichi). As a child, Galza is voiced by Natsumi Kawaida (川井田 夏海, Kawaida Natsumi).

==== Carantula ====
Carantula (クランチュラ, Kuranchura), also known as the "Dark Masked Magician" (闇の仮面遣い, Yami no Kamen-tsukai), is the Yodon Army's strategist who seeks inspiration from the culture and technology of the planets he invades to develop new methods for conquering them. He wields the Yodo Meter (ヨドメーター, Yodo Mētā) spear and is able to create Jamen (邪面; Evil Mask) masks to convert Bechats into Jamenshi and Dark Beasts into Jamen Beasts, storing the dark energy created by the former during their attacks in his staff to summon the latter.

However, after Yodonna splits him into five duplicates and the Kiramagers destroy the one embodying his loyalty to Emperor Yodon, Carantula becomes frustrated by Yodonna's subsequent abuse and bonds with Juru as a fellow artist. The former quits his position in Yodonheim and is almost executed by Yodon, but Galza saves Carantula to help him betray the emperor. Carantula later grants the Kiramagers access to Yodonheim and reclaims the Illusia (イリュージョア, Iryūjoa) Kanaema Stone for their final fight against Yodon. After Yodon's death, Carantula takes over leadership of Yodonheim and stops invading other planets.

Carantula is voiced by Yasuhiro Takato (高戸 靖広, Takato Yasuhiro).

==== Bechats ====
The Bechats (ベチャット, Bechatto) are the Yodon Army's foot soldiers who wield the Numade (ヌマデ) rakes. With a Jamen, a Bechat can be promoted to a Jamenshi. Through the power of Yodonna, a Bechat can become a zombie-like Hyper Bechats (ハイパーベチャット, Haipā Bechatto) with increased strength, but at the cost of expiring soon after. In the final fight against Emperor Yodon, the dark ruler summons Emperor Guard Bechats (エンペラーガードベチャット, Enperā Gādo Bechatto) as reinforcements.

==== Other members ====
- Numajo (ヌマージョ, Numājo): A past Yodonheim general and witch who wields a sword and is also known as the "Witch of the Stagnant Sea" (淀みの海の魔女, Yodomi no Umi no Majo). After being promoted, she attracted the attention of Oradin, Mabayuine, and Takamichi while placing curses on Crystarians. During their fight, she poisoned the Aqua Kiramai Stone to disable its purifying powers. She was killed by Oradin, but she used her dying breath to inflict Mabayuine with a death curse that nearly destroys Mabushina as well in the present. Using the Reversia (リバーシア, Ribāshia) Kanaema Stone, the Kiramagers travel to the past and obtain a sample of Numajo's poison before she is destroyed by Oradin in order to create an antidote and restore the Aqua Kiramai Stone. By the present, Yodonna salvages Numajo's Jamen to poison Shiguru, but Tametomo is able to help him destroy the mask and cure him. Numajo is voiced by Naoko Kouda (幸田 直子, Kōda Naoko).
- Minjo (ミンジョ): Numajo's younger sister who wields a scythe and is also known as the "Maestro of Nightmares" (悪夢のマエストロ, Akumu no Maesutoro). Initially appearing the past during the series, Minjo returns during the events of the film Mashin Sentai Kiramager the Movie: Be-Bop Dream, having assumed her own human form. When Yodonheim invaded Crystaria, she stole the sentient Dream Stone (ドリームストーン, Dorīmu Sutōn) from the Crystarian royal palace and put her cursed tag on it to manipulate the Yumeria (ユメーリア, Yumēria) dream world that the stone creates. She then traps Galza and the Kiramagers in Yumeria, intending to kill them all so she can become Yodonheim's top general. However, her plan is foiled and she turns herself into a Jamen that latches onto Remudon to become Minjo Remudon, resulting in her demise. Minjo is voiced by Mitsu Dan (壇 蜜, Dan Mitsu), who also portrays her human form.

==== Jamenshi ====
The Jamenshi (邪面師, Evil Masked Masters) are Bechats enhanced by a Jamen tasked with overseeing the gathering of Dark Energy (闇エナジー, Yami Enajī) needed to open an invasion gate for a Jamen Beast to emerge from. Due to a debt contract with Carantula, part of a Jamenshi's energy can be used to complete the summoning ritual if they fail to gather enough dark energy before they are destroyed.

- Rugby Jamen (ラグビー邪面, Ragubī Jamen): A rugby-themed monster. He is destroyed by Kiramai Green. Rugby Jamen is voiced by Miou Tanaka (田中 美央, Tanaka Miō).
- Manriki Jamen (マンリキ邪面): A vise-themed monster. He is destroyed by Kiramai Blue. Manriki Jamen is voiced by Yūichi Iguchi (井口 祐一, Iguchi Yūichi).
- Neanderthaljin Jamen (ネアンデルタールジン邪面, Neanderutārujin Jamen): A Neanderthal-themed monster. He is destroyed off-screen by the Kiramagers.
- Joystick Jamen (ジョイスティック邪面, Joisutikku Jamen): A joystick-themed monster. He is destroyed by Kiramai Red. Joystick Jamen is voiced by Kanehira Yamamoto (山本 兼平, Yamamoto Kanehira).
- Digital Camera Jamen (デジタルカメラ邪面, Dejitaru Kamera Jamen): A digital camera-themed monster. He is crushed by Cloud Hildon. Digital Camera Jamen is voiced by Shun Horie (堀江 瞬, Horie Shun).
- Freezer Jamen (フリーザー邪面, Furīzā Jamen): A refrigerator-themed monster and Oven Jamen's younger brother. He is destroyed by Galza. Freezer Jamen is voiced by Mitsuki Saiga (斎賀 みつき, Saiga Mitsuki).
- Oven Jamen (オーブン邪面, Ōbun Jamen): An oven-themed monster and Freezer Jamen's older brother. He is destroyed by the Kiramagers. Oven Jamen is voiced by Yūji Ueda (うえだ ゆうじ, Ueda Yūji).
- Hyakunin Isshu Jamen (ヒャクニンイッシュ邪面): A Hyakunin Isshu-themed monster. He is destroyed by the Kiramagers. Hyakunin Isshu Jamen is voiced by Yōji Ueda (上田 燿司, Ueda Yōji).
- Music Jamen (ミュージック邪面, Myūjikku Jamen): A music-themed monster. He is destroyed by Kiramai Blue. Music Jamen is voiced by Kenichirou Matsuda (松田 健一郎, Matsuda Ken'ichirō).
- Reset Button Jamen (リセットボタン邪面, Risetto Botan Jamen): A reset button-themed monster. He is destroyed by Galza. Reset Button Jamen is voiced by Shinya Hamazoe (浜添 伸也, Hamazoe Shin'ya).
- Inseki Jamen (インセキ邪面): A meteorite-themed monster. He is destroyed by Kiramai Silver. Inseki Jamen is voiced by Masuo Amada (天田 益男, Amada Masuo).
- SL Jamen (SL邪面, Esu Eru Jamen): A steam locomotive-themed monster. He is crushed by Diesel Basura. SL Jamen is voiced by Kan Tanaka (田中 完, Tanaka Kan).
- Marshmallow Jamen (マシュマロ邪面, Mashumaro Jamen): A marshmallow-themed monster. He is destroyed by Kiramai Silver. Marshmallow Jamen is voiced by Masaya Onosaka (小野坂 昌也, Onosaka Masaya).
- Mogura Tataki Jamen (モグラタタキ邪面): A Whac-A-Mole-themed monster. He is destroyed by Kiramai Yellow. Mogura Tataki Jamen is voiced by Hiroyuki Muraoka (村岡 弘之, Muraoka Hiroyuki), who also portrays his human form.
- Sumikae Jamen (スミカエ邪面): A relocation-themed monster. He is destroyed by Kiramai Silver. Sumikae is voiced by Hiroki Shimowada (下和田 ヒロキ, Shimowada Hiroki).
- Setchakuzai Jamen (セッチャクザイ邪面): An adhesive-themed monster. He is destroyed by Kiramai Yellow and Silver. Setchakuzai Jamen is voiced by Shōta Hayama (葉山 翔太, Hayama Shōta).
- Tsurizao Jamen (ツリザオ邪面): A fishing rod-themed monster. He is destroyed by Kiramai Silver. Tsurizao Jamen is voiced by Kenta Sasa (佐々 健太, Sasa Kenta).
- Kinko Jamen (キンコ邪面): A safe-themed monster. He is destroyed by Kiramai Red. Kinko Jamen is voiced by Naoya Uchida (内田 直哉, Uchida Naoya).
- Speaker Jamen (スピーカー邪面, Supīkā Jamen): A loudspeaker-themed monster. He is destroyed by Kiramai Silver. Speaker Jamen is voiced by Tetsuya Kakihara (柿原 徹也, Kakihara Tetsuya).
- Bakudan Jamen (バクダン邪面): A bomb-themed monster. After Yodonna splits Bakudan Jamen into the Bakudan-V (バクダンV, Bakudan Faibu), they are destroyed by the Go Kiramagers, excluding Yellow, and Kiramai Silver. Voiced by Subaru Kimura (木村 昴, Kimura Subaru).
- Kyoryoku Setchakuzai Jamen (キョウリョクセッチャクザイ邪面, Kyōryoku Setchakuzai Jamen): A superglue-themed monster and Setchakuzai Jamen's younger brother. He is destroyed by Go Kiramai Red. Kyoryoku Setchakuzai Jamen is voiced by Masaaki Yano (矢野 正明, Yano Masaaki).
- Mannequin Jamen (マネキン邪面, Manekin Jamen): A mannequin-themed monster. He is destroyed by Go Kiramai Blue. Voiced by Kohsuke Toriumi (鳥海 浩輔, Toriumi Kōsuke).
- Nazokake Jamen (ナゾカケ邪面): A riddle-themed monster. He is destroyed by Go Kiramai Red. Nazokake Jamen is voiced by Nezucchi (ねづっち, Nezutchi).
- Golf Jamen (ゴルフ邪面, Gorufu Jamen): A golf-themed monster. He is destroyed by Kiramai Red. Golf Jamen is voiced by Kazuya Ichijō (一条 和矢, Ichijō Kazuya).
- Mushiba Jamen (ムシバ邪面): A tooth decay-themed monster. He is destroyed by Kiramai Blue. Mushiba Jamen is voiced by Tetsuya Yanagihara (柳原 哲也, Yanagihara Tetsuya).
- Harigane Jamen (ハリガネ邪面): A wire-themed monster. He is destroyed by Go Kiramai Red. Harigane Jamen is voiced by Shūichirō Ōtani (大谷 秀一郎, Ōtani Shūichirō).
- Manekineko Jamen (マネキネコ邪面): A Maneki-neko-themed monster. He is destroyed by Go Kiramai Red. Manekineko Jamen is voiced by Taiten Kusunoki (楠 大典, Kusunoki Taiten).

===== Other Jamenshi =====
- Movie Jamen (ムービー邪面, Mūbī Jamen): A film-themed monster who later merges with the Kantoku Minosaurs to become the Movie Minosaur, only to be destroyed by Kiramaizin and KishiryuOh Five Knights. This Jamenshi appears exclusively in the crossover film Mashin Sentai Kiramager vs. Ryusoulger and is voiced by Shunsuke Takeuchi (武内 駿輔, Takeuchi Shunsuke).
- Shunkan Setchakuzai Jamen (シュンカンセッチャクザイ邪面): Another superglue-themed monster. This Jamenshi appears exclusively in the web-exclusive episode Yodonna 3: Yodonna's Valentine and is voiced by Taisei Takaiwa (高岩 泰声, Takaiwa Taisei).
- Camera Jamen (カメラ邪面, Kamera Jamen): A camera-themed monster. This Jamenshi appears exclusively in the web-exclusive episode Yodonna 3: Yodonna's Valentine and is voiced by Shōma Uno (宇野 翔真, Uno Shōma).

==== Jamen Beasts ====
The Jamen Beasts (邪面獣, Jamenjū; Evil Masked Beasts) are giant monsters that were originally Yodonheim animals known as Dark Beasts (闇獣, Yamijū) before being equipped with a Jamen. A Jamen Beast is summoned from an invasion gate after a Jamenshi fills the gauge on Carantula's staff with Dark Energy and will attempt to create bigger summoning circles to bring Yodonheim's main forces to the planet unless they are destroyed before then. Among the different types of Dark Beasts are the leech-like Hildon (ヒルドン, Hirudon), the crayfish-like Regani (リガニー, Riganī), the river snail-like Shelga (シェルガ, Sheruga), the black bass-like Basura (バスラ), the two-headed giant water bug-like Dagames (ダガメス, Dagamesu), and the vampire squid-like Gomoryu (ゴモリュウ, Gomoryū).

- Jaguchi Hildon (ジャグチヒルドン, Jaguchi Hirudon): A Hildon outfitted with a tap-themed Jamen. It is destroyed by the Kiramai Mashin.
- Rugar Regani (ラガーリガニー, Ragā Riganī): A Regani outfitted with a rugby-themed Jamen. It is destroyed by Land Mage.
- Manriki Shelga (マンリキシェルガ, Manriki Sheruga): A Shelga outfitted with a vise-themed Jamen. It is destroyed by Kiramaizin.
- Kyusekki Basura (キュウセッキバスラ, Kyūsekki Basura): A Basura outfitted with a Paleolithic stone tool-themed Jamen. It is destroyed by Smog Jouki.
- Catcher Regani (キャッチャーリガニー, Kyatchā Riganī): A Regani outfitted with a claw crane-themed Jamen. It is destroyed by Kiramaizin.
- Cloud Hildon (クラウドヒルドン, Kuraudo Hirudon): A Hildon outfitted with a cloud storage-themed Jamen. It is destroyed by Land Mage Lifton Rollerand.
- Renetsu Dagames (レーネツダガメス, Rēnetsu Dagamesu): A Dagames whose heads are outfitted with two temperature-themed Jamen: one cold-themed and the other heat-themed. It is destroyed by King Express.
- Heiankyo Basura (ヘイアンキョウバスラ, Heiankyō Basura): A Basura outfitted with a Heian-kyō-themed Jamen. It is destroyed by King Express.
- Stage Shelga (ステージシェルガ, Sutēji Sheruga): A Shelga outfitted with a stage-themed Jamen. It is destroyed by Kiramaizin.
- Hassha Button Regani (ハッシャボタンリガニー, Hassha Botan Riganī): A Regani outfitted with a launch button-themed Jamen. It is destroyed by Kiramaizin Express.
- Haejigoku Shelga (ハエジゴクシェルガ, Haejigoku Sheruga): A Shelga outfitted with a Venus flytrap-themed Jamen. It is destroyed by Land Mage.
- Diesel Basura (ディーゼルバスラ, Dīzeru Basura): A Basura outfitted with a diesel locomotive-themed Jamen. It is destroyed by Kiramaizin Duston and King Express.
- Wanage Hildon (ワナゲヒルドン, Wanage Hirudon): A Hildon outfitted with a quoits-themed Jamen. It is destroyed by Kiramaizin Duston.
- Hassha Regani (ハッシャリガニー, Hassha Riganī): A Regani outfitted with a missile battery-themed Jamen. It is destroyed by Kiramaizin Magellan.
- Hammer Basura (ハンマーバスラ, Hanmā Basura): A Basura outfitted with a hammer-themed Jamen. It is destroyed by Gigant Driller.
- Jutaku Loan Dagames (ジュウタクローンダガメス, Jūtaku Rōn Dagamesu): A Dagames whose heads are outfitted with two mortgage loan-themed Jamen: one house-themed and the other money-themed. It is destroyed by Kiramaizin.
- Setchakuzai Shelga (セッチャクザイシェルガ, Setchakuzai Sheruga): A Shelga outfitted with an adhesive-themed Jamen. It is destroyed by Kiramai Driller.
- Motorboat Basura (モーターボートバスラ, Mōtābōto Basura): A Basura outfitted with a motorboat-themed Jamen. It is destroyed by King Express Zabyun.
- Kinkai Regani (キンカイリガニー, Kinkai Riganī): A Regani outfitted with a gold bar-themed Jamen. It is destroyed by King Express Zabyun.
- Jukebox Hildon (ジュークボックスヒルドン, Jūkubokkusu Hirudon): A Hildon outfitted with a jukebox-themed Jamen. It is destroyed by Kiramaizin.
- Kyoryoku Setchakuzai Shelga (キョウリョクセッチャクザイシェルガ, Kyōryoku Setchakuzai Sheruga): A Shelga outfitted with a superglue-themed Jamen. It is destroyed by Mashin Mach.
- Projector Gomoryu (プロジェクターゴモリュウ, Purojekutā Gomoryū): A Gomoryu outfitted with a projector-themed Jamen. It is destroyed by Grateful Phoenix.
- Torso Hildon (トルソーヒルドン, Torusō Hirudon): A Hildon outfitted with a mannequin torso-themed Jamen. It is destroyed by Grateful Phoenix.
- Pinch In Out Dagames (ピンチインアウトダガメス, Pinchi In Auto Dagamesu): A Dagames whose heads are outfitted with two screen pinching-themed Jamen: one pinch in-themed and the other pinch out-themed. It is destroyed by Grateful Phoenix.
- Tank Regani (タンクリガニー, Tanku Riganī): A Regani outfitted with a tank-themed Jamen. It is destroyed along with Sengoku Basura and Shield Shelga by Grateful Phoenix.
- Sengoku Basura (センゴクバスラ): A Basura outfitted with a Sengoku period/kabuto-themed Jamen and dual wields a pair of nihonto. It is destroyed along with Tank Regani and Shield Shelga by Grateful Phoenix.
- Shield Shelga (シールドシェルガ, Shīrudo Sheruga): A Shelga outfitted with a shield/tiki-themed Jamen. It is destroyed along with Tank Regani and Sengoku Basura by Grateful Phoenix.
- Cart Hildon (カートヒルドン, Kāto Hirudon): A Hildon outfitted with a golf cart-themed Jamen. It is destroyed by Smog Jouki.
- Turntable Gomoryu (ターンテーブルゴモリュウ, Tāntēburu Gomoryū): A Gomoryu outfitted with a direct-drive turntable-themed Jamen. It is destroyed by Kiramaizin, King Express Zabyun, Gigant Driller, and Grateful Phoenix.
- Kiba Basura (キババスラ): A Basura outfitted with a fang/foothold trap-themed Jamen. It is destroyed by Grateful Phoenix.
- Jiishiki Shelga (ジイシキシェルガ, Jiishiki Sheruga): A Shelga outfitted with a self-consciousness-themed Jamen. It is destroyed by Land Mage.
- Nekokan Regani (ネコカンリガニー, Nekokan Riganī): A Regani outfitted with a canned cat food-themed Jamen. It is destroyed by Gigant Driller.

===== Other Jamen Beasts =====
- Minjo Remudon (ミンジョレムードン, Minjo Remūdon): A Remudon (レムードン, Remūdon), a human-sized ram-like Dark Beast, that serves Minjo. It is later enlarged by Carantula and equipped with the Jamen that Minjo converts herself into. It and Minjo are destroyed by Kiramaizin, Gigant Driller, and King Express Zabyun. This Jamen/Dark Beast appears exclusively in Mashin Sentai Kiramager the Movie: Be-Bop Dream and is voiced by Kazuhiro Nakaya (中谷 一博, Nakaya Kazuhiro).

=== Crystaria ===
The Land of Jewels Crystaria (宝石の国クリスタリア, Hōseki no Kuni Kurisutaria) is a beautiful planet made up of gemstones. Prior to the series' beginning, the planet was invaded by the Yodonheim Empire, though its sole surviving heir was able to escape. After the Kiramagers defeat Emperor Yodon, Crystaria is restored to its former glory via the power of the four Kanaema Stones.

==== Mabushina ====
Mabushina (マブシーナ, Mabushīna) is the princess of Crystaria, Takamichi's foster sister, Oradin's daughter, and sole heir to his throne. When Yodonheim invaded the planet, Mabushina fled to Earth with the Kiramai Stones upon her father's instruction and recruited the Kiramagers. She was initially very close to and fond of Takamichi, but grew to resent him because of his absence during Yodonheim's invasion; even going so far as to blame him for Oradin's death. After Tametomo and Shiguru help her realize she had more to do with what happened to her father than Takamichi did, Mabushina reconciles with her foster brother. When she is afflicted by Numajo's curse, she learns the true reason as to why her brother left Crystaria. After returning to her home planet and using the Kanaema Stones to restore it, Mabushina is crowned Queen of Crystaria as both of her parents had lost their physical bodies.

Mabushina is voiced by Inori Minase (水瀬 いのり, Minase Inori).

==== Oradin ====
Oradin (オラディン) is Mabushina's father, Takamichi's foster father, a friend of Muryo's, and the king of Crystaria who was killed during Yodonheim's invasion when his younger brother, Galza, aligned himself with their enemy. Although his body was being kept by Yodonheim, his spirit began providing advice to Juru. Three decades prior, he met Muryo and Takamichi's father and adopted the latter after saving him from a Monstone. Ever since, Oradin kept in contact with the Hakataminami family. He also clashed with Numajo, who cursed his family in retaliation. After Juru rescues his soul from Yodonheim, Oradin fuses himself with the Miracle Stone and returns as Mashin Oradin.

Oradin is voiced by Tomokazu Sugita (杉田 智和, Sugita Tomokazu). As a child, Oradin is voiced by Takeru Kikuchi (菊池 勇成, Kikuchi Takeru).

==== Mabayuine ====
Mabayuine (マバユイネ) is Oradin's wife, Mabushina's mother, Takamichi's foster mother, and the queen of Crystaria. Decades prior, she was seemingly killed by Numajo's curse. This prompted Takamichi to return to Earth in search of the Kanaema Stones upon realizing that Mabushina could fall victim to the curse as well. However, Takamichi and Mabushina eventually learn that before she died, Mabayuine transferred her life energy to her headdress' jewel and can be revived from it once she regains her energy.

Mabayuine is voiced by Houko Kuwashima (桑島 法子, Kuwashima Hōko).

=== CARAT ===
CARAT (カラット, Karatto; Caring And Radical Ambitious Team) is a private planetary safeguard agency based at the palm tree-themed Coconut Tower (ココナッツタワー, Kokonattsu Tawā) in Japan. Though it was originally founded to fight off Yodonheim, CARAT has also become involved in financing buildings, vehicles, as well as a fashion model agency that the Kiramagers work at as a cover for their heroic duties. CARAT also serves as the Kiramagers' base and shelter for Mabushina and her family after their home planet is destroyed. In their fight against Yodonheim, CARAT receives support from the sporting goods company SCRTC, Sena's athletics sponsor who had previously supported the Kiramagers' predecessors, the Gekirangers.

==== Muryo Hakataminami ====
Muryo Hakataminami (博多南 無鈴, Hakataminami Muryō) is the 45-year-old founder of CARAT and younger brother of Takamichi who provides support to the Kiramagers against Yodonheim's invasion of Earth. He is also the CEO of the jewelry company Coconut Bay (ココナッツベイ, Kokonattsu Bei) and a family friend of Oradin's after the king met Muryo's father, acting as a father figure to the Kiramagers and Mabushina. While Oradin sensed his Kiramental and offered to make him a Kiramager when he was 15, Muryo chose to help the Crystarian in a support role as opposed to a combat role.

Muryo Hakataminami is portrayed by Daimaou Kosaka (古坂大魔王, Kosaka Daimaō). As a teenager, Muryo is portrayed by Souma Asada (浅田 壮摩, Asada Sōma).

=== Mizuki Kakihara ===
Mizuki Kakihara (柿原 瑞希, Kakihara Mizuki) is Juru Atsuta's classmate, later girlfriend, who views everyone around her as boring or mediocre and puts on a cheerful, perfect front to hide her true cunning yet mean-spirited personality. She is initially unaware of Atsuta's work with the Kiramagers until they get stuck together due to Setchakuzai Jamen's adhesive-related powers. As a result, they learn each other's secrets and eventually start going out together.

During the events of the web-exclusive series Yodonna, Kakihara is possessed by the spirit of the titular character, who intended to use Atsuta's life force to revive herself. Yodonna starts to use Kakihara's life force instead, but the two end up bonding and teaching each other about emotions, with the former helping the latter work on her attitude. In light of their friendship, Yodonna separates herself from Kakihara and sacrifices herself to save the latter from a yakuza leader that Kakihara's detective brother, Shosuke, was investigating.

Mizuki Kakihara is portrayed by Mizuki Saiba (西葉 瑞希, Saiba Mizuki).

=== Monstones ===
Monstones (モンストーン, Monsutōn) are parasitic stone monsters that can merge with life forms. One such monster merged with Takamichi three decades prior, leading Oradin to fuse his body with the Shining Kiramai Stone in order to save him. In the present, Galza uses his Jamental to turn it into a stronger Jaaku Monstone (邪悪モンストーン, Jaaku Monsutōn) to take control of Takamichi until Juru extracted it from his body using the Destoria Kanaema Stone. After a Monstone absorbed the Energia (エネルギア, Enerugia) Kanaema Stone into its body, it enlarged into a giant form and gained superhuman strength, but was destroyed by Gigant Driller.

== Guest characters ==
- SCRTC (スクラッチ, Sukuratchi): A sporting goods company, Sena's athletics sponsor, and a front for the Geki Jūken Beast Arts (激獣拳ビーストアーツ, Geki Jūken Bīsuto Ātsu; Fierce Beast-Fist Beast Arts) martial arts school that had previously supported the Kiramagers' predecessors, the Gekirangers, and currently supports CARAT in their fight against Yodonheim.
  - Miki Masaki (真咲 美希, Masaki Miki): The head of SCRTC's special development department, master of the Geki Jū Leopard-Ken (激獣レオパルド拳, Geki Jū Reoparudo-ken) fighting style, and ally of the Gekirangers. Kazue Itō (伊藤 かずえ, Itō Kazue) reprises her role from Juken Sentai Gekiranger.
  - Natsume Masaki (真咲 なつめ, Masaki Natsume): Miki's daughter, member of SCRTC's special development department, ally of the Gekirangers, and a friend of Sena's from college who facilitated SCRTC sponsoring her. Sakina Kuwae (桑江 咲菜, Kuwae Sakina) reprises her role from Juken Sentai Gekiranger.

== Spin-off characters ==
- Shosuke Kakihara (柿原 章介, Kakihara Shōsuke): A detective and Mizuki Kakihara's older brother who appears exclusively in the web-exclusive specials Yodonna and Yodonna 2. Shosuke Kakihara is portrayed by Yosuke Kishi (岸 洋佑, Kishi Yōsuke).
- Toru Enoshima (江ノ島 徹, Enoshima Tōru): Shosuke Kakihara's corrupt boss who holds secret communication with Hideki Kujirasaki and appears exclusively in the web-exclusive specials Yodonna and Yodonna 2. Toru Enoshima is portrayed by Yuu Kamio (神尾 佑, Kamio Yū).
- Hideki Kujirasaki (鯨咲 秀樹, Kujirasaki Hideki): The leader of the yakuza group Kuchinawa-gumi (口縄組) who appears exclusively in the web-exclusive specials Yodonna and Yodonna 2. Hideki Kujirasaki is portrayed by Hideo Ishiguro (石黒 英雄, Ishiguro Hideo).
- Yanako Nishinoura (西之浦 矢那子, Nishinoura Yanako), Shimasa (嶋佐), and Zuo (頭尾): Members of the Kuchinawa-gumi who appear exclusively in the web-exclusive specials Yodonna and Yodonna 2. Yanako Nishinoura, Shimasa, and Zuo are portrayed by Saori Izawa (伊澤 彩織, Izawa Saori), Kentaro Shimazu (島津 健太郎, Shimazu Kentarō), and Koji Saikawa (才川 コージ, Saikawa Kōji) respectively.
- Hern (ヘルン, Herun): The judge of the Soul Management Bureau (魂管理局, Tamashii Kanrikyoku) who appears exclusively in the web-exclusive specials Yodonna, Yodonna 2, and Yodonna 3: Yodonna's Valentine. Hern is voiced by Hisao Egawa (江川 央生, Egawa Hisao).
- Mose (モーズ, Mōzu): The executioner of the Soul Management Station who appears exclusively in the web-exclusive specials Yodonna, Yodonna 2, and Yodonna 3: Yodonna's Valentine. Mose is voiced by Hiroshi Kamiya (神谷 浩史, Kamiya Hiroshi).
- Datula (ダチュラ, Dachura): A deceased Yodonheim scientist who created a resurrection device and appears exclusively in the web-exclusive special Yodonna. Datula is voiced by Yasuhiro Takato, who also voices Carantula and Kerontula (ケロンチュラ, Keronchura), who appears exclusively in the web-exclusive special Yodonna 3: Yodonna's Valentine.
- Hanidora (ハニドラ): The pope of the Yodon Religious Organization (ヨドン教団, Yodon Kyōdan) who assumes the human identity of Miko (ミコ) and appears exclusively in the web-exclusive special Yodonna 3: Yodonna's Valentine. Hanidora is voiced by Tomoko Miyadera (宮寺 智子, Miyadera Tomoko), while Miko is portrayed by Hinami Mori (森 日菜美, Mori Hinami).
- Rose (ローズ, Rōzu), Salvia (サルビア, Sarubia), Marguerite (マーガレット, Māgaretto), and Dahlia (ダリア, Daria): Bank robbers who appear exclusively in the web-exclusive special Yodonna: The Final. Rose, Salvia, Marguerite, and Dahlia are portrayed by Mei Angela (アンジェラ 芽衣, Anjera Mei), Toomi (十味, Tōmi), Himeka Araya (新谷 姫加, Araya Himeka), and Marupi (まるぴ) respectively.
- Samuyama (寒山): A high-ranking member of the yakuza group Orochi-gumi (小呂地組) who appears exclusively in the web-exclusive special Yodonna: The Final. Samuyama is portrayed by Takaya Aoyagi (青柳 尊哉, Aoyagi Takaya).
- Kamoshida (鴨志田) and Eri (エリ): A couple who runs the flower shop Yukito (ゆきと) where Yodonna works, and appears exclusively in the web-exclusive special Yodonna: The Final. Kamoshida and Eri are portrayed by Sho Tomita (富田 翔, Tomita Shō) and Miyuki Nishijima (ミユキニシジマ) respectively.
