= Super Sentai Strongest Battle =

Japanese television mini-drama

- Also known as: 4 Week Continuous Special Super Sentai Strongest Battle!!
- Genre: Tokusatsu; Superhero fiction Crossover fiction
- Created by: Toei Company
- Written by: Naruhisa Arakawa
- Directed by: Koichi Sakamoto
- Starring: Masaki Nakao; Ryota Ozawa; Shunsuke Nishikawa; Yosuke Kishi; Ai Moritaka; Nana Asakawa
- Narrated by: Tomokazu Seki
- Opening theme: "Saikyō Saikō Super Stars!"; Performed by NoB
- Country of origin: Japan
- Original language: Japanese
- No. of episodes: 4 (list of episodes)

Production
- Executive producer: Motoi Sasaki (TV Asahi)
- Producers: Chihiro Inoue (TV Asahi); Ayumi Kanno (TV Asahi); Kazuhiro Takahashi (Toei); Masayuki Yamada (Toei); Kōichi Yada (Toei Agency); Akihiro Fukada (Toei Agency)
- Running time: 24–25 minutes (ep 1-4); 94 minutes (director's cut)
- Production companies: TV Asahi; Toei Company; Toei Agency

Original release
- Network: TV Asahi
- Release: February 17 – March 10, 2019

Related
- Kaitou Sentai Lupinranger VS Keisatsu Sentai Patranger; Kishiryu Sentai Ryusoulger

4 Week Continuous Special Super Sentai Strongest Battle!! (4週連続スペシャル スーパー戦隊最強バトル!!, Yon-shū Renzoku Supesharu Sūpā Sentai Saikyō Batoru!!) is a Japanese tokusatsu minidrama (crossover special) based on the Toei's long-running Super Sentai metaseries featuring cast members from past installments and acts as a prelude to the events of Kishiryu Sentai Ryusoulger. It aired from February 17, 2019 to March 10, 2019, replacing Kaitou Sentai Lupinranger VS Keisatsu Sentai Patranger and was replaced by Kishiryu Sentai Ryusoulger. The program joining Kamen Rider Zi-O in the Super Hero Time line-up on TV Asahi affiliate stations.

== Plot ==
A mysterious girl named Rita invites members from the Super Sentai teams across history to Planet Nemesis (惑星ネメシス, Wakusei Nemeshisu). The heroes are told that any wish they desire will come true if they can win the “Super Sentai Greatest Battle” tournament, which divides 160 heroes into 32 teams of five to compete against each other to have their wishes granted while contending with the mysterious Gaisoulg who seeks worthy opponents to battle. The story follows the Oddball Team (変わり者チーム, Kawarimono Chīmu), who are composed of Zyuoh Eagle, Gokai Red, Aka Ninger, Sasori Orange, and ToQ 5gou, as they fight other heroes for the prize while learning the secrets behind the tournament.

== Cast ==
- Yamato Kazakiri (風切 大和, Kazakiri Yamato): Masaki Nakao (中尾 暢樹, Nakao Masaki)
- Captain Marvelous (キャプテン・マーベラス, Kyaputen Māberasu): Ryota Ozawa (小澤 亮太, Ozawa Ryōta)
- Takaharu Igasaki (伊賀崎 天晴, Igasaki Takaharu): Shunsuke Nishikawa (西川 俊介, Nishikawa Shunsuke)
- Stinger (スティンガー, Sutingā): Yosuke Kishi (岸 洋佑, Kishi Yōsuke)
- Kagura (カグラ): Ai Moritaka (森高 愛, Moritaka Ai)
- Rita (リタ): Nana Asakawa (浅川 梨奈, Asakawa Nana)

=== Voice cast ===
- Ryusoul Green (リュウソウグリーン, Ryūsō Gurīn): Yuito Obara (小原 唯和, Obara Yuito)
- Ryusoul Black (リュウソウブラック, Ryūsō Burakku): Tatsuya Kishida (岸田 タツヤ, Kishida Tatsuya)
- Narrator, Gaisoulg (ガイソーグ, Gaisōgu), Akarenger (アカレンジャー, Akarenjā; 2, 4): Tomokazu Seki (関 智一, Seki Tomokazu)
- Introduction Voice: Shinichirō Ōta (太田 真一郎, Ōta Shin'ichirō)

=== Guest cast ===
- Keiichiro Asaka (朝加 圭一郎, Asaka Keiichirō; 1): Kousei Yuki (結木 滉星, Yūki Kōsei)
- Eiji Takaoka (高丘 映士, Takaoka Eiji; 1): Masayuki Deai (出合 正幸, Deai Masayuki)
- Sōsuke Esumi (江角 走輔, Esumi Sōsuke; 1): Yasuhisa Furuhara (古原 靖久, Furuhara Yasuhisa)
- Doggie Kruger (ドギー・クルーガー, Dogī Kurūgā; Voice; 1–3): Tetsu Inada (稲田 徹, Inada Tetsu)
- Gokai Yellow (ゴーカイイエロー, Gōkai Ierō; Voice; 1), Luka Millfy (ルカ・ミルフィ, Ruka Mirufi; 3–4): Mao Ichimichi (市道 真央, Ichimichi Mao)
- Gao Red (ガオレッド, Gao Reddo; Voice; 1), Kakeru Shishi (獅子 走, Shishi Kakeru; 2): Noboru Kaneko (金子 昇, Kaneko Noboru)
- Ryu Ranger (リュウレンジャー, Ryū Renjā; Voice; 2–3): Keiichi Wada (和田 圭市, Wada Keiichi)
- Ninja White (ニンジャホワイト, Ninja Howaito; Voice; 2): Satomi Hirose (広瀬 仁美, Hirose Satomi)
- Master Red (マスターレッド, Masutā Reddo; 3–4): Masaya Kikawada (黄川田 将也, Kikawada Masaya)

== Episodes ==
The episodes are called "Battles".

Battle	Title	Original release date
1	"Who Is the Strongest in History!?"; Transliteration: "Shijō Saikyō wa Dare da!?" (Japanese: 史上最強は誰だ！？)	February 17, 2019
The Gokaigers are attacked and defeated by Gaisoulg, who seeks the strongest Super Sentai member, before Captain Marvelous receives a golden ticket. He, among hundreds of other Sentai members, are teleported to the planet Nemesis for a tournament held by a girl named Rita, who promises to grant the winner a wish. The Sentai members are divided into teams of five, with Marvelous placed in the "Oddball Team", along with Yamato Kazakiri, Takaharu Igasaki, Stinger, and Kagura, so he can face Gaisoulg again. In the first round, Yamato faces Keiichiro Asaka, who forfeits upon realizing his team's wish for a peaceful world is one they must attain themselves. Takaharu and Stinger succeed in the second round, but are attacked by Gaisoulg. Meanwhile, Ryusoul Green and Black, who also possess tickets, explore a cave together.
2	"The Secretive Armor of Mystery"; Transliteration: "An'yaku Suru Nazo no Yoroi" (Japanese: 暗躍する謎の鎧)	February 24, 2019
Gaisoulg retreats after Marvelous comes to Takaharu and Stinger's aid and reprimands the former for interfering in his vendetta against Gaisoulg before isolating himself from the rest of the Oddball Team. Meanwhile, Gaisoulg meets with Rita, revealing his possession of a golden ticket. She allows him to participate in the tournament. While Takaharu and Kagura attempt to cheer Marvelous up, Stinger leaves to investigate on his own while Yamato is informed the next round was meant to be a three-on-three match against the Gaorangers' Gao Red, the Gingamen's Ginga Green, and the Sun Vulcan team's Vul Shark. Despite being outnumbered, Yamato opts to fight them alone, determined to fulfill a dead friend's unfulfilled dream of running with animals in the wild. After Yamato wins the battle, Takaharu is attacked by Gaisoulg again while Stinger discovers a hidden lab containing several books about the Super Sentai along with a revelation. When Gaisoulg interferes in another battle, Marvelous intercepts him and knocks off his helmet, revealing Takaharu's face underneath. Concurrently, Ryusoul Green and Black continue their exploration, discovering some RyuSouls along the way.
3	"The Great Secret Revealed"; Transliteration: "Abakareta Dai Himitsu" (Japanese: 暴かれた大秘密)	March 3, 2019
While Takaharu leaves an unconscious Marvelous behind, Stinger is approached by Doggie Kruger, with both revealing they agreed to participate to investigate Rita's true intentions. Kruger scans some of the texts Stinger found to have them translated, but they are attacked by foot soldiers from past Sentai enemy factions. As they escape, Kruger finds Marvelous and takes him back to the others while Stinger is attacked by Gaisoulg. Rita announces the Oddball Team's next match will be a duel between Kagura and Kruger. After Kagura wins, Kruger entrusts her with his Master License and a D-Wapper before leaving. Gaisoulg attacks her, but Yamato and Marvelous arrive to protect her and defeat him. To their surprise, Stinger is now inside Gaisoulg's armor, which they realize is sentient and possesses its wearer. Once Kruger's analysis is completed, the Oddball team learn that Rita's true objective is to revive Ultimate Great Satan, but struggle to figure out how to find the missing Takaharu. Revealing that his fellow Gokaiger Luka Millfy was also taken by Gaisoulg, Marvelous allows himself to be possessed by the armor. Meanwhile, Ryusoul Green and Black's tickets cause them to disappear just as Master Red enters the cave.
4	"And Towards Tomorrow!"; Transliteration: "Soshite Ashita e!" (Japanese: そして明日へ！)	March 10, 2019
Marvelous uses Gaisoulg's helmet to locate and free Luka and Takaharu while Yamato and Stinger confront Rita, who reveals she intends to use Ultimate Great Satan to destroy the universe and avenge Nemesis' dead inhabitants in spite of Stinger's attempts to dissuade her. The Oddball Team confront Ultimate Great Satan, but are overpowered until Luka destroys the barrier surrounding Nemesis. Marvelous summons the Gokai Galleon to keep Ultimate Great Satan at bay while the Oddball Team channel the power of their Super Sentai predecessors to destroy him. Incensed at her plans being foiled, Rita dons Gaisoulg's armor and attacks the weakened Oddball Team until Ryusoul Green and Black arrive to defeat her before leaving. As the Oddball Team use Kruger's D-Wapper to arrest Rita and celebrate their victory, an unknown person retrieves Gaisoulg's helmet. Meanwhile, Master Red discovers a blank Ryusoul, which transforms into the Red Ryusoul in his hand.

== Theme song ==
- "Saikō Saikyō Super Stars!" (最高最強 SUPER STARS！, Saikō Saikyō Sūpā Sutāzu!; "Strongest and Best Super Stars!")
  - Lyrics: Shio Watanabe (渡部 紫緒, Watanabe Shio)
  - Composition: Nobuo Yamada (山田 信夫, Yamada Nobuo)
  - Arrangement: Go Sakabe (坂部 剛, Sakabe Gō)
  - Artist: NoB

== See also ==
Kamen Rider × Super Sentai: Ultra Super Hero Taisen
