= List of Japanese films of 2020 =

This is a list of Japanese films that were released in 2020.

== Highest-grossing films ==
The following is a list of the 10 highest-grossing Japanese films released at the Japanese box office during 2020.

Rank	Title	Gross
1	Demon Slayer: Kimetsu no Yaiba the Movie: Mugen Train	¥36.55 billion ($342.31 million)
2	From Today, It's My Turn the Movie!	¥5.37 billion ($50.29 million)
3	The Confidence Man JP: Episode of the Princess	¥3.84 billion ($35.96 million)
4	Doraemon: Nobita's New Dinosaur	¥3.35 billion ($31.37 million)
5	Stigmatized Properties	¥2.34 billion ($21.92 million)
6	Threads: Our Tapestry of Love	¥2.27 billion ($21.26 million)
7	Violet Evergarden: The Movie	¥2.13 billion ($19.95 million)
8	Kaiji: Final Game	¥2.06 billion ($19.29 million)
9	Fate/stay night: Heaven's Feel III. spring song	¥1.95 billion ($18.26 million)
10	My Hero Academia: Heroes Rising	¥1.79 billion ($16.76 million)

== Film releases ==
=== January–March ===
Opening		Title	Director	Cast	Ref(s)
J A N U A R Y	8	Stare	Hirotaka Adachi	Marie Iitoyo, Yu Inaba, Shugo Oshinari, Mitsuki Tanimura	
J A N U A R Y	10	Kaiji: Final Game	Tōya Satō	Tatsuya Fujiwara, Sota Fukushi, Nagisa Sekimizu, Mackenyu, Kōtarō Yoshida, Toshiki Seto	
J A N U A R Y	10	King of Prism All Stars: Prism Show Best 10	Masakazu Hishida	Junta Terashima, Soma Saito, Tasuku Hatanaka, Taku Yashiro, Takuma Nagatsuka, Masashi Igarashi, Yuma Uchida	
J A N U A R Y	17	Made in Abyss: Dawn of the Deep Soul	Masayuki Kojima	Miyu Tomita, Mariya Ise, Shiori Izawa, Sayaka Ohara, Aki Toyosaki, Mutsumi Tamura	
J A N U A R Y	17	High School Fleet: The Movie	Yuu Nobuta, Jun Nakagawa	Shiina Natsukawa, Lynn, Nozomi Furuki, Atsumi Tanezaki	
J A N U A R Y	17	Family Bond	Hajime Gonno	Tsuyoshi Nagabuchi, Naoko Iijima, Mayu Yamaguchi, Hiroshi Jun	
J A N U A R Y	17	The Memory Eraser	Yuichiro Hirakawa	Ryosuke Yamada, Kyoko Yoshine, Misako Renbutsu, Kuranosuke Sasaki	
J A N U A R Y	17	Last Letter	Shunji Iwai	Takako Matsu, Suzu Hirose, Ryunosuke Kamiki, Masaharu Fukuyama	
J A N U A R Y	22	His	Rikiya Imaizumi	Hio Miyazawa, Kisetsu Fujiwara, Wakana Matsumoto, Honoka Matsumoto	
J A N U A R Y	22	Romance Doll	Yuki Tanada	Issey Takahashi, Yū Aoi, Kenta Hamano, Toko Miura	
J A N U A R Y	24	Signal 100	Lisa Takeba	Kanna Hashimoto, Yuta Koseki, Toshiki Seto, Shouma Kai, Masaki Nakao, Shodai Fukuyama	
J A N U A R Y	24	Our 30-Minute Sessions	Kentarō Hagiwara	Mackenyu, Takumi Kitamura, Sayu Kubota, Shono Hayama	
J A N U A R Y	29	AI A.M.O.K.	Yu Irie	Takao Osawa, Kento Kaku, Takanori Iwata, Masahiro Takashima	
J A N U A R Y	31	We Make Antiques 2	Masaharu Take	Kiichi Nakai, Kuranosuke Sasaki, Ryōko Hirosue, Tomochika, Aoi Morikawa, Yūki Yamada	
J A N U A R Y	31	Project Dream: How to Build Mazinger Z's Hangar	Tsutomu Hanabusa	Mahiro Takasugi, Yusuke Kamiji, Yukino Kishii, Keita Machida	
F E B R U A R Y	5	Goblin Slayer: Goblin's Crown	Takaharu Ozaki	Yūichirō Umehara, Yui Ogura, Nao Tōyama, Yuichi Nakamura	
F E B R U A R Y	7	Howling Village	Takashi Shimizu	Ayaka Miyoshi, Ryota Bando, Tsuyoshi Furukawa, Hina Miyano	
F E B R U A R Y	8	Kishiryu Sentai Ryusoulger VS Lupinranger VS Patranger	Katsuya Watanabe	Hayate Ichinose, Keito Tsuna, Ichika Osaki, Yuito Obara, Tatsuya Kishida, Katsumi Hyodo, Asahi Itou, Shogo Hama, Haruka Kudo, Kousei Yuuki, Ryo Yokoyama, Kazusa Okuyama, Seiya Motoki	
F E B R U A R Y	14	Wotakoi: Love Is Hard for Otaku	Yuichi Fukuda	Mitsuki Takahata, Kento Yamazaki, Nanao, Takumi Saitoh, Kento Kaku, Tsuyoshi Muro, Mio Imada, Yumi Wakatsuki	
F E B R U A R Y	14	Eiri	Keishi Otomo	Gō Ayano, Ryuhei Matsuda, Mariko Tsutsui, Tomoya Nakamura	
F E B R U A R Y	14	Good-Bye!	Izuru Narushima	Yo Oizumi, Eiko Koike, Asami Mizukawa, Ai Hashimoto	
F E B R U A R Y	14	Dangerous Drugs of Sex	Hideo Jojo	Sho Watanabe, Takashi Kitadai, Kouhei Nagano, Ruri Shinato, Seiki Chiba, Sousuke Yamamoto	
F E B R U A R Y	19	Twittering Birds Never Fly: The Clouds Gather	Kaori Makita	Tarusuke Shingaki, Wataru Hatano, Kazuyuki Okitsu, Yūki Ono	
F E B R U A R Y	19	The World's Greatest First Love: Proposal	Chiaki Kon	Takashi Kondō, Katsuyuki Konishi, Yukari Tamura, Shinnosuke Tachibana	
F E B R U A R Y	21	Digimon Adventure: Last Evolution Kizuna	Tomohisa Taguchi	Natsuki Hanae, Yoshimasa Hosoya, Suzuko Mimori	
F E B R U A R Y	21	Stolen Identity 2	Hideo Nakata	Yudai Chiba, Ryo Narita, Mai Shiraishi, Takuma Ono	
F E B R U A R Y	21	The Shape of Red	Yukiko Mishima	Kaho, Satoshi Tsumabuki, Tasuku Emoto, Shotaro Mamiya, Reiko Kataoka	
F E B R U A R Y	26	First Love	Takashi Miike	Masataka Kubota, Nao Ōmori, Shōta Sometani, Sakurako Konishi	
F E B R U A R Y	26	Shirobako: The Movie	Tsutomu Mizushima	Juri Kimura, Noriko Shitaya, Haruka Yoshimura, Asami Takano, Hitomi Ōwada	
F E B R U A R Y	28	Kamen Rider Zi-O NEXT TIME: Geiz, Majesty	Satoshi Morota	Gaku Oshida, So Okuno, Shieri Ohata, Keisuke Watanabe, Rihito Itagaki, Ayaka Konno, Kentaro Kanesaki, Kenjiro Tsuda	
M A R C H	6	Fukushima 50	Setsurō Wakamatsu	Kōichi Satō, Ken Watanabe, Hidetaka Yoshioka, Narumi Yasuda	
M A R C H	6	A Life Turned Upside Down: My Dad's an Alcoholic	Kenji Katagiri	Honoka Matsumoto, Kiyohiko Shibukawa, Yui Imaizumi, Yuri Tsunematsu	
M A R C H	6	Masked Ward	Hisashi Kimura	Kentaro Sakaguchi, Mei Nagano, Rio Uchida, Noriko Eguchi, Masanobu Takashima	
M A R C H	6	Stardust Over the Town	Taiichi Sugiyama	Saburo Ohiro, LaSalle Ishii, Takayasu Komiya, Tetsu Watanabe, Denden	
M A R C H	13	Prince of Legend 2	Hayato Kawai	Alan Shirahama, Ryota Katayose, Nobuyuki Suzuki, Reo Sano, Mandy Sekiguchi, Kazuma Kawamura	
M A R C H	18	Not Quite Dead Yet	Shinji Hamasaki	Suzu Hirose, Ryo Yoshizawa, Shinichi Tsutsumi, Lily Franky, Yukiyoshi Ozawa, Kyūsaku Shimada	
M A R C H	20	All About March	Kazuhiko Yukawa	Haru, Ryo Narita, Hana Sugisaki, Kenshi Okada, Hitomi Kuroki	
M A R C H	27	Psycho-Pass 3: First Inspector	Naoyoshi Shotani	Ayane Sakura, Kenji Nojima, Hiroki Tōchi, Kinryū Arimoto	

=== April–June ===
Opening		Title	Director	Cast	Ref(s)
A P R I L	none	—N/a (due to a coronavirus pandemic)	—N/a	—N/a	—N/a
M A Y	none	—N/a (due to a coronavirus pandemic)	—N/a	—N/a	—N/a
J U N E	10	Grimm Reaper's Case Book	Takayuki Shibasaki	Hiroki Suzuki, Kentaro Yasui, Tsubasa Sakiyama	
J U N E	19	A Whisker Away	Junichi Sato, Tomotaka Shibayama	Mirai Shida, Natsuki Hanae, Kōichi Yamadera, Hiroaki Ogi	
J U N E	19	Gone Wednesday	Kohei Yoshino	Tomoya Nakamura, Natsumi Ishibashi, Ayumu Nakajima	

=== July–September ===
Opening		Title	Director	Cast	Ref(s)
J U L Y	3	Healing Hearts	Tetsuo Shinohara	Airi Matsui, Masayasu Yagi, Masaru Mizuno, Hiroko Nakajima	
J U L Y	3	Mother	Tatsushi Ōmori	Masami Nagasawa, Daiken Okudaira, Sadao Abe, Kaho, Sarutoki Minagawa, Taiga Nakano	
J U L Y	3	I Never Shot Anyone	Junji Sakamoto	Renji Ishibashi, Michiyo Ōkusu, Ittoku Kishibe, Kaori Momoi	
J U L Y	3	Kotera-san Climbs!	Tomoyuki Furumaya	Haruka Kudō, Kentaro Ito, Jin Suzuki, Ai Yoshikawa, Karin Ono	
J U L Y	10	Crazy Love Stories: Kiss Him, Not Me!	Norihisa Hiranuma	Hokuto Yoshino, Fuju Kamio, Asahi Ito, So Okuno, Miu Tomita, Nonoka Yamaguchi, Satsuki Nakayama, Miku Uehara, Mio Yuki	
J U L Y	11	Blood-Club Dolls 2	Shutaro Oku	Ryūnosuke Matsumura, Ryō Kitazano, Kanon Miyahara, Keisuke Minami, Maon Kurosaki	
J U L Y	17	From Today, It's My Turn the Movie!	Yuichi Fukuda	Kento Kaku, Kentaro Ito, Nana Seino, Kanna Hashimoto, Yumi Wakatsuki, Taiga Nakano, Yūma Yamoto, Nobuyuki Suzuki, Hayato Isomura, Reiya Masaki, Maika Yamamoto, Yuki Izumisawa, Yūya Yagira	
J U L Y	17	Hachioji Zombies	Osamu Suzuki	Kenjiro Yamashita, Yuki Kubota, Ray Fujita, Haruki Kiyama, Yuta Ozawa, Akira Takano	
J U L Y	17	Theater	Isao Yukisada	Kento Yamazaki, Mayu Matsuoka, Kanichiro, Sairi Ito, Kodai Asaka	
J U L Y	17	Step	Ken Iizuka	Takayuki Yamada, Rine Tanaka, Tamaki Shiratori, Midorisaki Nakano, Sairi Ito	
J U L Y	23	Gekijouban Secret × Heroine Phantomirage!: ~Eiga ni Natte Choudai Shimasu!~	Takashi Miike	Minami Hishida, Kira Yamaguchi, Toa Harada, Ran Ishii, Mandy Sekiguchi, Tsubasa Honda, Takumi Saitoh, Rina Yamaguchi, Ryouka Minamide, Takafumi Imai, Akiyoshi Nakao, Sasuke Otsuru, Nicole Ishida, Dandy Sakano, Takahiro Kuroishi, Pee	
J U L Y	24	#HandballStrive	Daigo Matsui	Seishiro Kato, Kotaro Daigo, Himi Sato, Ryota Bando, Fuku Suzuki	
J U L Y	24	The Confidence Man JP: Episode of the Princess	Ryo Tanaka	Masami Nagasawa, Masahiro Higashide, Fumiyo Kohinata	
J U L Y	29	Go! Go! Stupid Woman!	Koto Nagata	Ayane, Nicole Ishida, Mao, Hayato Onozuka	
A U G U S T	7	Doraemon: Nobita's New Dinosaur	Kazuaki Imai	Wasabi Mizuta, Megumi Ohara, Yumi Kakazu, Subaru Kimura, Tomokazu Seki	
A U G U S T	7	Grand Blue	Tsutomu Hanabusa	Ryo Ryusei, Atsuhiro Inukai, Yūki Yoda, Aya Asahina, Yuka Ogura, Ren Ishikawa, Suzunosuke Tanaka, Hiroaki Iwanaga, Yuya Hirata	
A U G U S T	7	Revue Starlight: Rondo Rondo Rondo	Tomohiro Furukawa	Momoyo Koyama, Suzuko Mimori, Maho Tomita, Aina Aiba, Haruki Iwata, Hinata Satō	
A U G U S T	7	Ultraman Taiga The Movie: New Generation Climax	Ryuichi Ichino	Yuki Inoue, Ryotaro, Ayuri Yoshinaga, Chiharu Niiyama, Kou Nanase, Takuya Negishi, Kiyotaka Uji, Kensuke Takahashi, Hideo Ishiguro, Tatsuomi Hamada, Yuya Hirata, Ryosuke Koike	
A U G U S T	12	Fate/stay night: Heaven's Feel III. spring song	Tomonori Sudō	Noriaki Sugiyama, Noriko Shitaya, Yū Asakawa, Mai Kadowaki	
A U G U S T	14	Date A Bullet: Dead or Bullet	Jun Nakagawa	Asami Sanada, Saori Ōnishi, Kaede Hondo, Mariya Ise	
A U G U S T	14	Yowamushi Pedal	Koichiro Miki	Ren Nagase, Kentaro Ito, Kanna Hashimoto, Ryota Bando, Ryo Ryusei	
A U G U S T	21	Love Me or Love Me Not?	Takahiro Miki	Minami Hamabe, Takumi Kitamura, Riko Fukumoto, Eiji Akaso	
A U G U S T	21	Given	Hikaru Yamaguchi	Shōgo Yano, Yuma Uchida, Masatomo Nakazawa, Takuya Eguchi	
A U G U S T	21	Threads: Our Tapestry of Love	Takahisa Zeze	Masaki Suda, Nana Komatsu, Nana Eikura, Takumi Saitoh, Mizuki Yamamoto, Mitsuko Baisho, Ryo Narita, Fumi Nikaido, Mahiro Takasugi, Fumika Baba	
A U G U S T	28	Blue, Painful, and Brittle	Shunsuke Kariyama	Ryo Yoshizawa, Hana Sugisaki, Amane Okayama, Honoka Matsumoto, Hiroya Shimizu, Nana Mori	
A U G U S T	28	Stigmatized Properties: Scary Layouts	Hideo Nakata	Kazuya Kamenashi, Nao, Kōji Seto, Noriko Eguchi	
S E P T E M B E R	4	Restart After Come Back Home	Ryuta Inoue	Yuki Furukawa, Ryo Ryusei, Eri Murakawa, Gaku Sano	
S E P T E M B E R	4	The Brightest Roof in the Universe	Michihito Fujii	Kaya Kiyohara, Kentaro Ito, Miki Mizuno, Takashi Yamanaka, Kotaro Daigo, Maki Sakai	
S E P T E M B E R	9	Daughters	Hajime Tsuda	Ayaka Miyoshi, Junko Abe, Tomoka Kurotani, Hisako Okata	
S E P T E M B E R	9	Humanoid Monster Bela	Tsutomu Hanabusa	Win Morisaki, Emma, Akane Hotta, Sosuke Yoshida	
S E P T E M B E R	11	L'étranger de la Plage	Akiyo Ohashi	Taishi Murata, Yoshitsugu Matsuoka, Yū Shimamura, Ayumi Fujimura	
S E P T E M B E R	11	The Magnificent Kotobuki Complete Edition	Tsutomu Mizushima	Sayumi Suzushiro, Eri Yukimura, Sayaka Nakaya, Asami Seto, Hibiku Yamamura	
S E P T E M B E R	11	Crayon Shin-chan: Crash! Rakuga Kingdom and Almost Four Heroes	Takahiko Kyōgoku	Yumiko Kobayashi, Miki Narahashi, Toshiyuki Morikawa	
S E P T E M B E R	11	The Cornered Mouse Dreams of Cheese	Isao Yukisada	Tadayoshi Okura, Ryo Narita, Shiori Yoshida, Honami Sato	
S E P T E M B E R	11	A Beloved Wife	Shin Adaji	Gaku Hamada, Asami Mizukawa, Chise Niitsu, Kaho, Kayoko Okubo	
S E P T E M B E R	18	Love Me, Love Me Not: The Animation	Toshimasa Kuroyanagi	Marika Suzuki, Megumi Han, Nobunaga Shimazaki, Sōma Saitō	
S E P T E M B E R	18	Violet Evergarden: The Movie	Taichi Ishidate	Yui Ishikawa, Takehito Koyasu, Daisuke Namikawa, Aya Endō, Koki Uchiyama, Minori Chihara	
S E P T E M B E R	25	Keep Your Hands Off The Movie!	Tsutomu Hanabusa	Asuka Saitō, Mizuki Yamashita, Minami Umezawa, Masahiro Takashima, Hiyori Sakurada, Sakurako Konishi	
S E P T E M B E R	25	Midnight Swan	Eiji Uchida	Tsuyoshi Kusanagi, Misaki Hattori, Asami Mizukawa, Tomorowo Taguchi, Sei Matobu	

=== October–December ===
Opening		Title	Director	Cast	Ref(s)
O C T O B E R	2	The Asadas!	Ryōta Nakano	Kazunari Ninomiya, Satoshi Tsumabuki, Masaki Suda, Jun Fubuki, Mitsuru Hirata, Haru Kuroki, Makiko Watanabe	
O C T O B E R	2	Burn the Witch	Tatsuro Kawano	Asami Tano, Yuina Yamada, Shimba Tsuchiya, Hiroaki Hirata	
O C T O B E R	2	Love Stage!!	Hiroki Inoue	Mahiro Sugiyama, Hiroki Nakada, Shinichi Wago, Daigo	
O C T O B E R	2	WAVE!! Surfing Yappe!!	Takaharu Ozaki	Tomoaki Maeno, JIn Ogasawara, Yoshiki Nakajima, Takuya Satō, Yusuke Shirai, Shinichi Toki	
O C T O B E R	2	All the Things We Never Said	Yuya Ishii	Taiga Nakano, Yuko Oshima, Park Jung-bum, Katsuya Maiguma	
O C T O B E R	2	Our Story	Shigeaki Kubo	Taiki Sato, Kanna Hashimoto, Ryuji Sato, Kyoka Shibata	
O C T O B E R	9	The Real Thing	Kōji Fukada	Win Morisaki, Kaho Tsuchimura, Shohei Uno, Kei Ishibashi	
O C T O B E R	9	Under the Stars	Tatsushi Ōmori	Mana Ashida, Masatoshi Nagase, Tomoyo Harada	
O C T O B E R	9	Hope	Yukihiko Tsutsumi	Shinichi Tsutsumi, Yuriko Ishida, Kenshi Okada, Kaya Kiyohara, Masaya Kato, Yoshie Ichige	
O C T O B E R	16	Mio's Cookbook	Haruki Kadokawa	Honoka Matsumoto, Nao, Kōji Ishizaka, Nakamura Shidō II	
O C T O B E R	16	Demon Slayer: Kimetsu no Yaiba the Movie: Infinity Train	Haruo Sotozaki	Natsuki Hanae, Akari Kitō, Hiro Shimono, Yoshitsugu Matsuoka, Satoshi Hino, Daisuke Hirakawa	
O C T O B E R	16	Wife of a Spy	Kiyoshi Kurosawa	Yū Aoi, Issey Takahashi, Ryota Bando, Yuri Tsunematsu	
O C T O B E R	21	True Mothers, Comes Morning	Naomi Kawase	Hiromi Nagasaku, Arata Iura, Aju Makita, Miyoko Asada, Hiroko Nakajima	
O C T O B E R	21	Happy-Go-Lucky Days	Takuya Satō	Kana Hanazawa, Mikako Komatsu, Takahiro Sakurai	
O C T O B E R	23	Always: Your Eyes Tell	Takahiro Miki	Yuriko Yoshitaka, Ryusei Yokohama, Kyosuke Yabe, Ryosei Tayama, Toru Nomaguchi, Eita Okuno	
O C T O B E R	23	We Are Oh! & Yeah!!	Satoshi Takemoto	Ryosuke Hashimoto, Shota Totsuka, Fumito Kawai, Koichi Goseki, Ryoichi Tsukada	
O C T O B E R	23	Living in Our Sky	Shinji Aoyama	Mikako Tabe, Yukino Kishii, Rie Mimura, Takanori Iwata, Shingo Tsurumi, Hisafumi Iwashita	
O C T O B E R	30	Pretty Cure Miracle Leap: A Wonderful Day with Everyone	Yukio Kaizawa	Eimi Naruse, Konomi Kohara, Kiyono Yasuno, Mikako Komatsu	
O C T O B E R	30	The Voice of Sin	Nobuhiro Doi	Shun Oguri, Gen Hoshino, Yutaka Matsushige, Kanji Furutachi, Shohei Uno, Yukiko Shinohara	
O C T O B E R	30	TonCuts DJ Agetaro	Ken Ninomiya	Takumi Kitamura, Maika Yamamoto, Kentaro Ito, Ryō Katō, Kodai Asaka	
N O V E M B E R	6	461 Days of Bento: A Promise Between Father and Son	Atsushi Kaneshige	Yoshihiko Inohara, Shunsuke Michieda, Nana Mori, Shijiei Wakabaya	
N O V E M B E R	6	Ora, Ora Be Goin' Alone	Shuichi Okita	Yūko Tanaka, Yū Aoi, Masahiro Higashide, Gaku Hamada, Munetaka Aoki, Kankurō Kudō	
N O V E M B E R	6	The Devil Wears Jūnihitoe	Hitomi Kuroki	Kentaro Ito, Ayaka Miyoshi, Sairi Ito, Taketo Tanaka	
N O V E M B E R	6	Monster Strike the Movie: Lucifer Zetsubō no Yoake	Kōbun Shizuno	Yōko Hikasa, Minami Takayama, Nana Mizuki, Maaya Uchida	
N O V E M B E R	6	Georama Boy, Panorama Girl	Natsuki Seta	Anna Yamada, Jin Suzuki, Erika Takizawa, Kogarashi Wagarashi, Sora Hirata, Yuizo Mochida	
N O V E M B E R	11	Hotel Royale	Masaharu Take	Haru, Kenichi Matsuyama, Kimiko Yo, Fukiko Hara, Sairi Ito, Amane Okayama	
N O V E M B E R	11	Sakura	Hitoshi Yazaki	Takumi Kitamura, Nana Komatsu, Ryo Yoshizawa	
N O V E M B E R	13	Flight on the Water	Atsushi Kaneshige	Ayami Nakajo, Yosuke Sugino, Ami Tomite, Sara Takatsuki, Saito Takamura, Kokoro Hirasawa	
N O V E M B E R	13	Date A Bullet: Dead or Bullet	Jun Nakagawa	Asami Sanada, Saori Ōnishi, Kaede Hondo, Mariya Ise	
N O V E M B E R	13	Japan Sinks 2020: The Movie	Masaaki Yuasa	Yuko Sasaki, Reina Ueda, Tomo Muranaka, Masaki Terasoma	
N O V E M B E R	13	The Legacy of Dr. Death: Black File	Yoshihiro Fukagawa	Gō Ayano, Keiko Kitagawa, Kenshi Okada, Ken Ishiguro	
N O V E M B E R	13	Looking for Magical Doremi	Junichi Sato, Haruka Kamatani	Rena Matsui, Aoi Morikawa, Kanako Momota, Shohei Miura, Kenta Hamano, Akira Ishida	
N O V E M B E R	20	Food Luck!	Jimon Terakado	Naoto, Tao Tsuchiya, Ken Ishiguro, Satoru Matsuo, Yasufumi Terawaki, Hakuryu	
N O V E M B E R	20	Stand by Me Doraemon 2	Ryūichi Yagi, Takashi Yamazaki	Wasabi Mizuta, Megumi Ōhara, Yumi Kakazu, Tomokazu Seki, Subaru Kimura	
N O V E M B E R	20	Any Crybabies Around?	Takuma Sato	Taiga Nakano, Riho Yoshioka, Ichiro Kan, Takashi Yamanaka	
N O V E M B E R	20	Runway	Norichika Oba	Asami Mizukawa, Kodai Asaka, Uta Yorikawa, Kei Kinoshita, Shota Sometani	
N O V E M B E R	20	Barbara	Makoto Tezuka	Goro Inagaki, Fumi Nikaido, Kiyohiko Shibukawa, Shizuka Ishibashi, Minami Bages, Ryosuke Otani	
N O V E M B E R	27	Over the Sky	Yoshinobu Sena	Honoka Matsumoto, Toshiki Seto, Saori Hayami, Yui Ogura	
N O V E M B E R	27	Underdog	Masaharu Take	Mirai Moriyama, Takumi Kitamura, Ryo Katsuji	
D E C E M B E R	4	Silent Tokyo	Takafumi Hatano	Kōichi Satō, Yuriko Ishida, Hidetoshi Nishijima, Tomoya Nakamura, Alice Hirose	
D E C E M B E R	4	Takizawa Kabuki Zero 2020 The Movie	Hideaki Takizawa	Hikaru Iwamoto, Tatsuya Fukazawa, Raul, Shota Watanabe, Koji Mukai, Ryohei Abe	
D E C E M B E R	4	Mrs. Noisy	Yukiko Shinohara	Yukiko Shinohara, Yoko Otaka, Takuma Nagao, Chise Niitsu	
D E C E M B E R	9	Fate/Grand Order: Divine Realm of the Round Table: Camelot	Kei Suezawa, Kazuto Arai	Mamoru Miyano, Nobunaga Shimazaki, Rie Takahashi, Maaya Sakamoto, Ayako Kawasumi, Takahiro Mizushima	
D E C E M B E R	11	Yes, No, or Maybe?	Masahiro Takata	Atsushi Abe, Yoshihisa Kawahara	
D E C E M B E R	11	Marudase Kintarō	Hideki Araki	Toshiyuki Morikawa, Soma Saito, Katsumi Fukuhara, Shota Hayama, Wataru Hatano, Takuma Terashima	
D E C E M B E R	11	Tengaramon	Mitsutoshi Tanaka	Haruma Miura, Shohei Miura, Takanori Nishikawa, Yuki Morinaga, Aoi Morikawa, Takaya Sakoda	
D E C E M B E R	18	The Promised Neverland	Yuichiro Hirakawa	Minami Hamabe, Kairi Jo, Rihito Itagaki, Naomi Watanabe, Keiko Kitagawa, Miyu Ando, Soma Santoki	
D E C E M B E R	18	The New Three Kingdoms	Yūichi Fukuda	Yo Oizumi, Takayuki Yamada, Tsuyoshi Muro, Satoshi Hashimoto, Tsutomu Takahashi, Jiro Sato, Yu Shirota, Shun Oguri, Kenshi Okada, Kento Kaku, Kanna Hashimoto, Mizuki Yamamoto, Takanori Iwata, Hayato Isomura	
D E C E M B E R	18	Kamen Rider Saber: The Phoenix Swordsman and the Book of Ruin	Takayuki Shibasaki	Shuichiro Naito, Takaya Yamaguchi, Ryo Aoki, Yuki Ikushima, Eiji Togashi, Hiroaki Oka, Asuka Kawazu, Tobi, Masashi Taniguchi, Sota Uchiyama, Mizuki Yamaguchi, Masataka Nakamura, Arisa Ogata, Taisei Miyagishi	
D E C E M B E R	18	Kamen Rider Zero-One: REAL X TIME	Teruaki Sugihara	Fumiya Takahashi, Noa Tsurushima, Ryutaro Okada, Hiroe Igeta, Daisuke Nakagawa, Syuya Sunagawa, Nachi Sakuragi, Daichi Yamaguchi, Satsuki Nakayama, Asumi Narita, Arata Saeki, Kazuya Kojima, Hideaki Itō, Kōichi Yamadera	
D E C E M B E R	18	Hold Me Back!	Akiko Oku	Rena Nōnen, Kento Hayashi, Asami Usuda, Takuya Wakabayashi, Tomoya Maeno, Maho Yamada	
D E C E M B E R	25	Poupelle of Chimney Town	Yusuke Hirota	Masataka Kubota, Mana Ashida, Shinosuke Tatekawa, Jun Kunimura, Eiko Koike, Shingo Fujimori, Sairi Ito	
D E C E M B E R	25	Josee, the Tiger and the Fish	Kōtarō Tamura	Taishi Nakagawa, Kaya Kiyohara, Yume Miyamoto, Kazuyuki Okitsu, Lynn, Chiemi Matsutera	
D E C E M B E R	25	Pokémon the Movie 2020: Coco	Tetsuo Yajima	Rika Matsumoto, Ikue Ōtani, Mayumi Iizuka, Yuji Ueda	
D E C E M B E R	25	Awake	Atsuhiro Yamada	Ryo Yoshizawa, Ryuya Wakaba, Motoki Ochiai, Kanichiro, Fumika Baba	

=== Delayed or postponed ===
Below is a list of films delayed or postponed due to the COVID-19 pandemic in Japan.

Status	Title	Director	Cast	Original release date	New release date or action taken	Ref(s)
P O S T P O N E D	Free! Road to the World: Dream	Eisaku Kawanami	Nobunaga Shimazaki, Tatsuhisa Suzuki, Tsubasa Yonaga, Daisuke Hirakawa, Mamoru Miyano, Yoshimasa Hosoya	Summer 2020	2021	
P O S T P O N E D	Violet Evergarden: The Movie	Taichi Ishidate	Yui Ishikawa, Takehito Koyasu, Daisuke Namikawa, Aya Endō, Koki Uchiyama, Minori Chihara	January 10, 2020 (first time); April 24, 2020 (second time)	September 18, 2020	
P O S T P O N E D	Pretty Cure Miracle Leap: A Wonderful Day with Everyone	Yukio Kaizawa	Eimi Naruse, Konomi Kohara, Kiyono Yasuno, Mikako Komatsu	March 20, 2020 (first time); May 15, 2020 (second time)	October 30, 2020	
P O S T P O N E D	Fate/stay night: Heaven's Feel III. spring song	Tomonori Sudō	Noriaki Sugiyama, Noriko Shitaya, Yū Asakawa, Mai Kadowaki	March 28, 2020 (first time); April 25, 2020 (second time)	August 12, 2020	
P O S T P O N E D	Step	Ken Iizuka	Takayuki Yamada, Rine Tanaka, Tamaki Shiratori, Midorisaki Nakano, Sairi Ito	April 3, 2020	July 17, 2020	
P O S T P O N E D	Princess Principal: Crown Handler	Masaki Tachibana	Aoi Koga, Akira Sekine, Yō Taichi, Akari Kageyama, Nozomi Furuki	April 10, 2020	February 12, 2021	
P O S T P O N E D	Detective Conan: The Scarlet Bullet	Chika Nagaoka	Minami Takayama, Wakana Yamazaki, Rikiya Koyama, Shūichi Ikeda	April 17, 2020	April 16, 2021	
P O S T P O N E D	Theater	Isao Yukisada	Kento Yamazaki, Mayu Matsuoka, Kanichiro, Sairi Ito, Kodai Asaka	April 17, 2020	July 17, 2020	
P O S T P O N E D	I Never Shot Anyone	Junji Sakamoto	Renji Ishibashi, Michiyo Ōkusu, Ittoku Kishibe, Kaori Momoi	April 24, 2020	July 3, 2020	
P O S T P O N E D	Threads: Our Tapestry of Love	Takahisa Zeze	Masaki Suda, Nana Komatsu, Nana Eikura, Takumi Saitoh, Mizuki Yamamoto, Ryo Narita, Fumi Nikaido, Mahiro Takasugi, Fumika Baba, Mitsuko Baisho	April 24, 2020	August 21, 2020	
P O S T P O N E D	Crayon Shin-chan: Crash! Rakuga Kingdom and Almost Four Heroes	Takahiko Kyōgoku	Yumiko Kobayashi, Miki Narahashi, Toshiyuki Morikawa	April 24, 2020	September 11, 2020	
P O S T P O N E D	Gekijouban Secret × Heroine Phantomirage!: ~Eiga ni Natte Choudai Shimasu~	Takashi Miike	Minami Hishida, Kira Yamaguchi, Toa Harada, Ran Ishii, Mandy Sekiguchi, Tsubasa Honda, Takumi Saitoh, Rina Yamaguchi, Ryouka Minamide, Takafumi Imai, Akiyoshi Nakao, Sasuke Otsuru, Nicole Ishida, Dandy Sakano, Takahiro Kuroishi, Pee	May 1, 2020	July 23, 2020	
P O S T P O N E D	The Confidence Man JP: The Movie 2	Ryo Tanaka	Masami Nagasawa, Masahiro Higashide, Fumiyo Kohinata	May 1, 2020	July 24, 2020	
P O S T P O N E D	Happy-Go-Lucky Days	Takuya Satō	Kana Hanazawa, Mikako Komatsu, Takahiro Sakurai	May 8, 2020	October 21, 2020	
P O S T P O N E D	The Ashes of My Flesh and Blood is the Vast Flowing Galaxy	Sabu	Taishi Nakagawa, Anna Ishii, Kai Inowaki, Kaya Kiyohara, Airi Matsui, Takumi Kitamura	May 8, 2020	April 9, 2021	
P O S T P O N E D	Brothers in Brothel	Takumi Saitoh, Jiro Sato	Takayuki Yamada, Riisa Naka, Yoko Kondo, Ririne Sasano	May 13, 2020	June 2021	
P O S T P O N E D	Given	Hikaru Yamaguchi	Shōgo Yano, Yuma Uchida, Masatomo Nakazawa, Takuya Eguchi	May 15, 2020	August 21, 2020	
P O S T P O N E D	Words Bubble Up Like Soda Pop	Kyōhei Ishiguro	Somegoro Ichikawa XIII, Hana Sugisaki, Kōichi Yamadera, Megumi Han	May 15, 2020	June 25, 2021	
P O S T P O N E D	Looking for Magical Doremi	Junichi Sato, Haruka Kamatani	Rena Matsui, Aoi Morikawa, Kanako Momota, Shohei Miura, Kenta Hamano, Akira Ishida	May 15, 2020	November 13, 2020	
P O S T P O N E D	Keep Your Hands Off The Movie!	Tsutomu Hanabusa	Asuka Saitō, Mizuki Yamashita, Minami Umezawa	May 15, 2020	September 25, 2020	
P O S T P O N E D	Gone Wednesday	Kohei Yoshino	Tomoya Nakamura, Natsumi Ishibashi, Ayumu Nakajima	May 15, 2020	June 19, 2020	
P O S T P O N E D	#HandballStrive	Daigo Matsui	Seishiro Kato, Kotaro Daigo, Himi Sato, Ryota Bando, Fuku Suzuki	May 22, 2020	July 24, 2020	
P O S T P O N E D	Our Story	Shigeaki Kubo	Taiki Sato, Kanna Hashimoto, Ryuji Sato, Kyoka Shibata	May 22, 2020	October 2, 2020	
P O S T P O N E D	Love Me, Love Me Not: The Animation	Toshimasa Kuroyanagi	Marika Suzuki, Megumi Han, Nobunaga Shimazaki, Sōma Saitō	May 29, 2020	September 18, 2020	
P O S T P O N E D	Grimm Reaper's Case Book	Takayuki Shibasaki	Hiroki Suzuki, Kentaro Yasui, Tsubasa Sakiyama	May 29, 2020	June 10, 2020	
P O S T P O N E D	Grand Blue	Tsutomu Hanabusa	Ryo Ryusei, Atsuhiro Inukai, Yūki Yoda, Aya Asahina, Yuka Ogura, Ren Ishikawa, Suzunosuke Tanaka, Hiroaki Iwanaga, Yuya Hirata	May 29, 2020	August 7, 2020	
P O S T P O N E D	Baragaki: Unbroken Samurai	Masato Harada	Junichi Okada, Kō Shibasaki, Ryohei Suzuki, Ryosuke Yamada, Hideaki Itō	May 29, 2020	October 2021	
P O S T P O N E D	Caution, Hazardous Wives	Tōya Satō	Haruka Ayase, Hidetoshi Nishijima, Kosuke Suzuki, Kenshi Okada, Atsuko Maeda, Shingo Tsurumi	June 5, 2020	March 19, 2021	
P O S T P O N E D	Noboru Kotera-san	Tomoyuki Furumaya	Haruka Kudō, Kentaro Ito, Jin Suzuki, Ai Yoshikawa, Karin Ono	June 5, 2020	July 3, 2020	
P O S T P O N E D	Hachioji Zombies	Osamu Suzuki	Kenjiro Yamashita, Yuki Kubota, Ray Fujita	June 5, 2020	July 17, 2020	
P O S T P O N E D	The Cornered Mouse Dreams of Cheese	Isao Yukisada	Tadayoshi Okura, Ryo Narita, Shiori Yoshida, Honami Sato	June 5, 2020	September 11, 2020	
P O S T P O N E D	True Mothers, Comes Morning	Naomi Kawase	Hiromi Nagasaku, Arata Iura, Aju Makita, Miyoko Asada, Hiroko Nakajima	June 5, 2020	October 21, 2020	
P O S T P O N E D	Flight on the Water	Atsushi Kaneshige	Ayami Nakajo, Yosuke Sugino, Ami Tomite, Sara Takatsuki, Saito Takamura, Kokoro Hirasawa	June 12, 2020	November 13, 2020	
P O S T P O N E D	Kiba: The Fangs of Fiction	Daihachi Yoshida	Yo Oizumi, Mayu Matsuoka, Kōichi Sato, Elaiza Ikeda, Takumi Saitoh	June 19, 2020	March 26, 2021	
P O S T P O N E D	TonCuts DJ Agetaro	Ken Ninomiya	Takumi Kitamura, Maika Yamamoto, Kentaro Ito, Ryō Katō, Kodai Asaka	June 19, 2020	October 30, 2020	
P O S T P O N E D	One Summer Story	Shuichi Okita	Moka Kamishiraishi, Kanata Hosoda, Yudai Chiba, Kanji Furutachi, Yuki Saito, Etsushi Toyokawa	June 26, 2020	2021	
P O S T P O N E D	Evangelion: 3.0+1.0 Thrice Upon a Time	Hideaki Anno	Megumi Ogata, Megumi Hayashibara, Yūko Miyamura, Maaya Sakamoto, Kotono Mitsuishi	June 26, 2020 (first time); January 22, 2021 (second time)	March 8, 2021	
P O S T P O N E D	Rurouni Kenshin: The Final	Keishi Ōtomo	Takeru Satoh, Emi Takei, Mackenyu, Munetaka Aoki, Yū Aoi, Kasumi Arimura, Tao Tsuchiya, Yōsuke Eguchi	July 3, 2020	April 23, 2021	
P O S T P O N E D	Pokémon the Movie 2020: Coco	Tetsuo Yajima	Rika Matsumoto, Ikue Ōtani, Mayumi Iizuka, Yuji Ueda	July 8, 2020	December 25, 2020	
P O S T P O N E D	Seitokai Yakuindomo 2	Hiromitsu Kanazawa	Shintarō Asanuma, Yōko Hikasa, Satomi Satō, Sayuri Yahagi	July 10, 2020	January 1, 2021	
P O S T P O N E D	Mashin Sentai Kiramager THE MOVIE: Bee-Bop Dream	Kyohei Yamaguchi	Rio Komiya, Rui Kihara, Yume Shinjo, Atomu Mizuishi, Mio Kudo, Kohei Shoji, Daimaou Kosaka, Inori Minase, Mitsu Dan	July 23, 2020	February 20, 2021	
P O S T P O N E D	Mobile Suit Gundam: Hathaway's Flash	Shūkō Murase	Kenshō Ono, Reina Ueda, Junichi Suwabe	July 24, 2020	May 7, 2021	
P O S T P O N E D	Tom and Sawyer in the City	Hayato Kawai	Kairi Jo, Sakai Daichi, Watanabe Shinyu, Daichi Yoshiwara, Shinra Yamashita	July 31, 2020	2021	
P O S T P O N E D	Rurouni Kenshin: The Beginning	Keishi Ōtomo	Takeru Satoh, Kasumi Arimura, Issey Takahashi, Kazuki Kitamura, Yōsuke Eguchi	August 7, 2020	June 4, 2021	
P O S T P O N E D	Stand by Me Doraemon 2	Ryūichi Yagi, Takashi Yamazaki	Wasabi Mizuta, Megumi Ōhara, Yumi Kakazu, Tomokazu Seki, Subaru Kimura	August 7, 2020	November 20, 2020	
P O S T P O N E D	Fate/Grand Order: Divine Realm of the Round Table: Camelot	Kei Suezawa, Kazuto Arai	Mamoru Miyano, Nobunaga Shimazaki, Rie Takahashi, Maaya Sakamoto, Ayako Kawasumi, Takahiro Mizushima	August 14, 2020	December 9, 2020	
P O S T P O N E D	Sailor Moon Eternal Series	Chiaki Kon	Kotono Mitsuishi, Hisako Kanemoto, Rina Satō, Ami Koshimizu, Shizuka Itō, Kenji Nojima	September 11, 2020	January 8, 2021	
P O S T P O N E D	What Happened to Our Nest Eggs?!	Tetsu Maeda	Yūki Amami, Yutaka Matsushige, Yua Shinkawa, Toshiki Seto	September 18, 2020	2021	
P O S T P O N E D	The Deer Kings	Masashi Ando, Masayuki Miyaji	Shinichi Tsutsumi, Ryoma Takeuchi, Anne Watanabe, Hisui Kimura	September 18, 2020	2021	
P O S T P O N E D	Touge: The Last Samurai	Takashi Koizumi	Kōji Yakusho, Takako Matsu, Kyōko Kagawa, Min Tanaka, Tatsuya Nakadai, Kento Nagayama	September 25, 2020	June 18, 2021	
P O S T P O N E D	Tokyo Revengers	Tsutomu Hanabusa	Takumi Kitamura, Yūki Yamada, Yosuke Sugino, Nobuyuki Suzuki, Hayato Isomura, Shotaro Mamiya, Ryo Yoshizawa, Gordon Maeda, Hiroya Shimizu, Mio Imada	October 9, 2020	July 2021	
P O S T P O N E D	The Night Beyond the Tricornered Window	Yukihiro Morigaki	Masaki Okada, Jun Shison, Yurina Hirate	October 30, 2020	January 22, 2021	

== See also ==
- 2020 in Japan
- 2020 in Japanese television
- List of 2020 box office number-one films in Japan
