= Love Is a Poison =

2024 Japanese television series

- Promotional poster
- Genre: Legal drama; Romance
- Created by: Keisuke Makino (novel)
- Written by: Izumi Kawasaki
- Directed by: Maiko Ouchi; Masataka Hayashi; Tatsuya Aoki
- Starring: Shogo Hama; Katsumi Hyodo
- Opening theme: "Love Toxin" by Wanuka
- Ending theme: "Geometric" by Osage
- Country of origin: Japan
- Original language: Japanese
- No. of seasons: 1
- No. of episodes: 12

Production
- Producer: Miura Wakana
- Running time: 20 minutes
- Production companies: Netflix; TBS

Original release
- Network: Netflix; TBS
- Release: September 10 – December 3, 2024

Love Is A Poison (Japanese: 毒恋～毒もすぎれば恋となる～, Hepburn: Doku Koi: Doku mo Sugireba Koi to Naru) is a 2024 Japanese television drama series starring Shogo Hama and Katsumi Hyodo. The series, based on the original novel of the same name written by Keisuke Makino, premiered on Netflix on September 10, 2024, and on TBS and TVer on September 17, 2024.

== Plot ==
Love Is A Poison follows Ryoma Shiba, a talented young lawyer who becomes a co-partner at a prestigious law firm after excelling in the bar exam. One night, he meets Haruto, a clever con artist, who suggests a partnership that piques Shiba's interest. He invites Haruto into his home as his "secret partner."

As they work together, their relationship shifts from professional to personal. Shiba, initially inexperienced in romance, gradually falls for the mischievous Haruto, who remains devoted and protective despite the challenges they face.

== Cast ==
Below are the cast of the series:

=== Main ===
- Shogo Hama as Ryoma Shiba
- Katsumi Hyodo as Haruto

=== Supporting ===
- Kogaken as Kotaro Kazama
- Aoba Kawai as Saki
- Ikuji Nakamura as Iwamine
- Noserin as Yuu
- Yoshihiko Hakamada as Mitsuyoshi Hachisuka
- Yoshihiro Kurita as Takayasu Arisuinbo

== Production ==
Directed by Maiko Ouchi, Masataka Hayashi, and Tatsuya Aoki, the series is adapted by Izumi Kawasaki from the original novel written by Keisuke Makino. The novel was first published by Kadokawa on July 25, 2024, while a manga of the same name was serialized in Manga Park and first distributed on July 23, 2024.

The series is a joint production between TBS and Netflix, which aired its first episode on Netflix on September 10, 2024 and on TBS on September 17, 2024, with new episodes broadcast weekly on Tuesdays at 23:56 JST.

== Episodes ==
No.	Title	Original release date
1	"Ice Elite Lawyer X Dog-like swamp boy. The birth of the strongest buddy"	September 10, 2024
2	"Okay, Try using me... My Housekeeper Haruto"	September 17, 2024
3	"Give me a reward for winning - Exposing influencer lies"	September 24, 2024
4	"This commotion in my chest is... Contact the beautiful cyborg"	October 1, 2024
5	"Get away from me - Goodbye, Ryo-kun"	October 8, 2024
6	"Take back your partner. I want to eat your rice balls"	October 15, 2024
7	"A dream trip to a hot spring. Are you curious about my past?"	October 29, 2024
8	"My precious partner - My Fair Haruto."	November 5, 2024
9	"I'll stand by you no matter what - A kiss of victory."	November 12, 2024
10	"Haruto's sealed past - The other half of the matching rings"	November 19, 2024
11	"Undercover Investigator Haruto - If you're by my side."	November 26, 2024
12	"Trial of Fate - A Holy Night's Gift"	December 3, 2024

== Accolades ==
Name of the award ceremony, year presented, category, nominee of the award, and the result of the nomination
Award ceremony	Year	Category	Nominee / Work	Result	Ref.
HUB Awards	2024	Highlight of the Year - Japan	Love is a Poison	Won	

=== Listicles ===
Year-end lists for Love Is A Poison
Critic/Publication	List	Rank	Ref.
Soompi	12 of the Best BL Dramas Released in 2024	Included	
