= Mana Kinjo =

Japanese actress (1996–2020)

- 金城 茉奈
- Kinjo at a press event for Kamen Rider Zi-O the Movie: Over Quartzer in 2019
- Born: February 24, 1996; Naha, Okinawa Prefecture, Japan
- Died: December 1, 2020 (aged 24)
- Occupations: Actress, model, tarento
- Years active: 2012–2020

Mana Kinjo (金城 茉奈, Kinjō Mana; February 24, 1996 – December 1, 2020) was a Japanese actress, model and tarento.

== Biography ==
Kinjo was a 4th gen member of the official Tokyo Girls Collection running team "TOKYO GIRLS RUN". She was a fan of Japanese rock, particularly One Ok Rock. She had one younger brother. It was reported on June 12, 2017, that she was in the hospital for treatment of her illness. She then returned.

She had been resting since 2019 due to illness, but her agency Grick announced on December 5, 2020, that she had died on December 1, 2020. She was 24 years old.

== Filmography ==
Year	Title	Role	Notes
2017	Nidome no natsu, nidoto aenai kimi	Himeko Kakyoin	
2019-2020	Kishiryu Sentai Ryusoulger	Ui Tatsui	38 episodes, (final appearance)
2019	Kîshiryû Sentai Ryûsorujâ Henshin Koza	Ui Tatsui	Video short
2019	Kîshiryû Sentai Ryûsorujâ The Mûbî Taimu Surippu! Kyôryû Panikku!!	Ui Tatsui	Short
