= Ichika Osaki =

Japanese actress (born 2000)

- Osaki at a press event for Kamen Rider Zi-O the Movie: Over Quartzer in 2019
- Born: December 2, 2000 (age 25); Kōchi Prefecture, Japan
- Education: Horikoshi High School
- Occupation: Actress
- Years active: 2012–present
- Agent: Oscar Promotion
- Website: Official website

Ichika Osaki (尾碕 真花, Osaki Ichika; born December 2, 2000) is a Japanese actress who is represented by Oscar Promotion. She is best known as Asuna/Ryusoul Pink in the 43rd Super Sentai series Kishiryu Sentai Ryusoulger.

== Biography and career ==
Ichika Osaki was born in Kōchi Prefecture, Japan on December 2, 2000.

In 2012, she won a beauty pageant that won her a spot as a member of the idol group X21. Since then, she has made appearances in commercials and various dramas. The group disbanded in 2018, and Osaki has since continued on her solo career.

In 2019, she joined the cast of Kishiryu Sentai Ryusoulger landing her first major television role as Asuna/Ryusoul Pink.

On June 1, 2026, she announced on her Instagram that she left Oscar Promotion. However, the agency responded through the official website that she is still under management contract and has not agreed to terminate the contract, and they have decided to take legal action against her. On the next day, she explains the circumstances surrounding her departure from the agency, stating that she had expressed her intention to leave several months ago and had engaged in ongoing discussions with the agency in hopes of an amicable resolution; however, she claimed that she doesn't have responses aimed at resolving the issues, and was instead met with repeated unilateral demands and conduct that could be perceived as coercive, and she was unable to make concrete plans for new work or future activities, which significantly impacted her career as an actress, causing the trust between her and the agency was completely irreparable.

== Filmography ==
=== TV dramas ===
| Year | Title | Role | Notes | Ref. |
|---|---|---|---|---|
| 2018 | Kamen Rider Zi-O | Mika | Episodes 13 and 14 | |
| 2019 | Kishiryu Sentai Ryusoulger | Asuna/Ryusoul Pink | | |
| 2022 | Yokai Housemate | Mei Shiratori | Season 2 | |
| 2022 | The 13 Lords of the Shogun | Aki | Taiga drama | |
| 2022 | Blue Box Briefing | Nogi | Episode 2 | |
| 2024 | The Tiger and Her Wings | Nodoka Hoshi | Asadora | |
| 2025 | Call Me by No-Name | Kotoha Furuhashi | Lead role | |
| 2025 | Cinderella Closet | Haruka Fukunaga | Lead role | |

=== Films ===
| Year | Title | Role | Notes | Ref. |
|---|---|---|---|---|
| 2018 | Chihayafuru Part 3 | Sae | | |
| 2019 | Kishiryu Sentai Ryusoulger the Movie: Time Slip! Dinosaur Panic | Asuna/Ryusoul Pink | | |
| 2019 | Blood Friends | | | |
| 2020 | Kishiryu Sentai Ryusoulger VS Lupinranger VS Patranger the Movie | Asuna/Ryusoul Pink | | |
| 2021 | Mashin Sentai Kiramager VS Ryusoulger | Asuna/Ryusoul Pink | | |
| 2022 | Yokai Housemate: Is He Prince Charming? | Mei Shiratori | | |
| 2023 | Four Days, Tokio | Yūki | Lead role | |
| 2026 | One Year to Live, Buy a Man | Sena's valued customer | | |
