= List of Kishiryu Sentai Ryusoulger episodes =

Kishiryu Sentai Ryusoulger is a Japanese tokusatsu television series, the last series in the franchise released in the Heisei period (filming and the first seven episodes aired are considered Heisei episodes), first series in the franchise released in Japan's Reiwa period (episode 8 is the first Reiwa episode), and the 43rd entry of Toei's long-running Super Sentai series produced by TV Asahi. The series follows the knights of the Ryusoul Tribe who fight the Druidon Tribe, a powerful race of monsters that once ruled Earth before fleeing to space 65 million years ago and have now returned to reclaim it.

== Episodes ==
No.	English title Original Japanese title	Written by	Original release date
1	"Que Booom!! Ryusoulger"; Transliteration: "Kebōn! Ryūsōjā" (Japanese: ケボーン!!竜装者(リュウソウジャー))	Junpei Yamaoka	March 17, 2019
Koh, Melto, and Asuna are three members of the Ryusoul Tribe who have just inherited the mantle of the Ryusoulgers and the duty of protecting Earth from their masters. The three of them soon meet a vlogger named Ui Tatsui, who is searching for proof of the tribe's existence for her father. The group's challenge begins when the Ryusoul Tribe's sworn enemy, the Druidon Tribe, return from their long self-imposed exile in space and send a giant monster known as a Minosaur to destroy the temple holding the resting Kishiryu.
2	"With Souls as One"; Transliteration: "Sōru o Hitotsu ni" (Japanese: ソウルをひとつに)	Junpei Yamaoka	March 24, 2019
The three Ryusolgers look for their Kishiryu after they disappeared following their first battle with the Druidon, with some help from Ui and her father, Naohisa Tatsui. They encounter a fencer named Mishima, who they learn is the host of an immature Unicorn Minosaur, who is siphoning the fencer's life force to reach his full size.
3	"The Cursed Gaze"; Transliteration: "Noroi no Shisen" (Japanese: 呪いの視線)	Junpei Yamaoka	March 31, 2019
Koh and his friends meet the other Ryusoulgers, brothers Towa and Bamba, while pursuing the Medusa Minosaur. The brothers are unimpressed with the new Ryusoulgers and refuse to accept them as allies. To make matters worse, Ui is revealed to be the Minosaur's host and Bamba attempts to kill her.
4	"'Saur and Tiger!! The Fastest Battle"; Transliteration: "Ryūko!! Saisoku Batoru" (Japanese: 竜虎！！最速バトル)	Junpei Yamaoka	April 7, 2019
Towa and Bamba begin searching for their Kishiryu before learning Koh has a map to the temples holding them, with the former challenging him to a duel over it. The ensuing rivalry soon becomes detrimental when the Kraken Minosaur starts putting people to sleep.
5	"Hell's Watchdog"; Transliteration: "Jigoku no Banken" (Japanese: 地獄の番犬)	Junpei Yamaoka	April 14, 2019
As Towa begins to grow close to the staff of a local animal health center, he joins Koh when the latter confronts Tankjoh in an attempt to avenge Master Red. However, the two of them fall into a trap set up by the Druidon and the poisonous Cerberus Minosaur.
6	"Counterattack!! Tankjoh"; Transliteration: "Gyakushū!! Tankujō" (Japanese: 逆襲!!タンクジョウ)	Junpei Yamaoka	April 21, 2019
With Tankjoh going on the offensive after harnessing seismic energy, the Ryusoulgers fall victim to the infectious properties of the Cerberus Minosaur's poison. After Asuna and Bamba are infected, Koh and Melto attempt to find a cure so they can stop Tankjoh's rampage together.
7	"The Princesses of Planet Cepeus"; Transliteration: "Kepeusu-sei no Ōjo" (Japanese: ケペウス星の王女)	Junpei Yamaoka	April 28, 2019
Princess Cardena of the Planet Cepeus arrives on Earth to request the Ryusoulgers' help in finding her missing sister, who she claims was taken by the Druidon. Soon after, the Ryusoulgers confront the Druidon sorcerer Wiserue.
8	"The Miraculous Singing Voice"; Transliteration: "Kiseki no Utagoe" (Japanese: 奇跡の歌声)	Junpei Yamaoka	May 5, 2019
The Ryusoulgers rescue the alien princesses, who wish to give Tyramigo an energy source that will increase his power tremendously in return. Though Koh immediately trusts them, Melto and Bamba become suspicious of their intentions.
9	"The Suspicious Treasure Chest"; Transliteration: "Ayashii Takarabako" (Japanese: 怪しい宝箱)	Ayumi Shimo	May 12, 2019
The Ryusoulgers find a game that leads participants to a magical wonderland where anything they wish for comes true. However, Melto is not convinced and suspects the Druidon are behind this so-called game.
10	"The Invincible Counter"; Transliteration: "Muteki no Kauntā" (Japanese: 無敵のカウンター)	Kaori Kaneko	May 19, 2019
Just as the Ryusoulgers go up against an invincible Minosaur capable of reflecting attacks directed against it, its host unexpectedly saves Asuna. While Koh tries to attack their latest foe directly, Asuna tries to save the monster's host even as Wiserue attempts to complicate matters for her.
11	"The Quiz King of Flames"; Transliteration: "Honō no Kuizu-ō" (Japanese: 炎のクイズ王)	Junpei Yamaoka	May 26, 2019
The Ryusoulgers and the Druidon are on the hunt for the Kishiryu DimeVolcano, who the Ryusoul Tribe sealed away due to its destructive power. However, to acquire the Kishiryu's loyalty, both parties must answer DimeVolcano's riddles to prevent it from going on a rampage.
12	"The Scorching Illusion"; Transliteration: "Shakunetsu no Gen'ei" (Japanese: 灼熱の幻影)	Junpei Yamaoka	June 2, 2019
The Ryusoulgers attempt to recover DimeVolcano after letting it get away, but Wiserue refuses to give up his quest to control it and has a Minosaur with apparent fire resistance created to lure the Kishiryu out. Just then, the mysterious Gaisoulg makes himself known to the Ryusoulgers and the Druidon in order to fight them both.
13	"The Prime Minister Is from the Ryusoul Tribe!?"; Transliteration: "Sōri-daijin wa Ryūsō-zoku!?" (Japanese: 総理大臣はリュウソウ族!?)	Junpei Yamaoka	June 9, 2019
Japan's first female prime minister, Mioko Karino, a woman of mystery, appears to know Bamba and offers to tell him and Towa about their Masters on the condition that they destroy the Minosaur born from her body once it has fully matured.
14	"The Golden Knight"; Transliteration: "Ōgon no Kishi" (Japanese: 黄金の騎士)	Junpei Yamaoka	June 23, 2019
As the Ryusoulgers gain a reluctant ally from the Sea Ryusoul Tribe named Canalo, who would rather find himself a bride, they all find themselves facing a bloodthirsty Druidon general who seeks their people's total annihilation.
15	"The King of the Deep Sea"; Transliteration: "Shinkai no Ō" (Japanese: 深海の王)	Naruhisa Arakawa	June 30, 2019
Canalo refuses to join the Ryusoulgers whilst attempting to get his little sister Oto back to the sea after she followed him ashore. Amidst a Minosaur attack, Oto is taken hostage by the Druidon in order to force Canalo to fight the Ryusoulgers.
16	"The Hope That Sunk into the Sea"; Transliteration: "Umi ni Shizunda Kibō" (Japanese: 海に沈んだ希望)	Naruhisa Arakawa	July 7, 2019
Canalo begins to see the Ryusoulgers in a better light after Koh saved Oto, but his Kishiryu MosaRex refuses to involve himself with the main Ryusoul Tribe for reasons unknown. As Canalo tries to convince his Kishiryu, he and the Ryusoulgers find themselves facing Gachireus after he upgraded himself using combat data he collected from their previous battles.
17	"The Captive Warrior"; Transliteration: "Toraware no Mosa" (Japanese: 囚われの猛者)	Ayumi Shimo	July 14, 2019
With Gachireus gone, Wiserue returns and uses a Minosaur to capture MosaRex so he can use his magic to turn the Kishiryu on Canalo. In response, he goes to the Ryusoulgers and MosaRex's sibling, DimeVolcano, for help.
18	"Big Trouble! Transformation Impossible!"; Transliteration: "Dai Pinchi! Henshin Funō!" (Japanese: 大ピンチ！変身不能！)	Hiroya Taka	July 21, 2019
While fighting the Druidons' latest Minosaur, the Ryusoulgers' suddenly lose their ability to transform. To make matters worse, Bamba and Canalo come to blows over the Minosaur's host, causing the monster to grow faster and bigger than past Minosaurs.
19	"The Advancing Tyramigo"; Transliteration: "Shingeki no Tiramīgo" (Japanese: 進撃のティラミーゴ)	Junpei Yamaoka	July 28, 2019
When elementary school students that the Kishiryu Tyramigo befriended during his walk and most of the Ryusoulgers disappear as part of a Druidon plot, the Kishiryu and Melto must find a way to rescue their friends.
20	"The Supreme Artist"; Transliteration: "Shikō no Geijutsuka" (Japanese: 至高の芸術家)	Hiroya Taka	August 4, 2019
The Druidon's latest Minosaur appears to be a failure, but under Wiserue's wing, it becomes a deadly threat as it causes the Ryusoulgers to disappear one by one. With Towa the last one standing, Gaisoulg returns to challenge him.
21	"The Kishiryu of Light and Darkness"; Transliteration: "Hikari to Yami no Kishiryū" (Japanese: 光と闇の騎士竜)	Junpei Yamaoka	August 11, 2019
While Canalo and MosaRex head off to investigate a mysterious power source coming from outer space, the other Ryusoulgers try to uncover the mystery behind the disappearances of several animals and plants along with the mysterious resurrections of several dead people: including Ui's mother, Master Pink, and Tankjoh.
22	"The Lives of the Dead!?"; Transliteration: "Shisha no Inochi!?" (Japanese: 死者の生命！？)	Junpei Yamaoka	August 18, 2019
In a shocking turn of events, the Ryusoulgers discover a Minosaur born from Master Pink is responsible for the resurrections. Armed with this knowledge, Koh leaves to face the Minosaur while the other Ryusoulgers confront the revived Tankjoh.
23	"The Legendary Ryusoul"; Transliteration: "Maboroshi no Ryūsōru" (Japanese: 幻のリュウソウル)	Ayumi Shimo	August 25, 2019
With their Ryusouls mysteriously losing power, the Ryusoulgers attempt a Ryusoul Trade to stop this from happening. To assist them, Canalo provides a Ryusoul capable of granting wishes, but Wiserue gets involved so he can take it for himself.
24	"The Karate Dojo of Love"; Transliteration: "Koi no Karate Dōjō" (Japanese: 恋の空手道場)	Naruhisa Arakawa	September 1, 2019
Canalo rescues and falls in love with the daughter of a dojo master, so he takes up karate to impress her and earn her father's respect. From the sidelines, Oto secretly asks Melto to help ensure her brother's success.
25	"A Dancing Kleon"; Transliteration: "Odoru Kureon" (Japanese: 踊るクレオン)	Kaori Kaneko	September 8, 2019
The creator of the Druidon's Minosaurs, Kleon, puts out a viral video starring himself and the Druidon's foot soldiers dancing like crazy, as well as a hidden Minosaur capable of stealing the souls of anyone who watches the video. When Ui, Oto, and Tyramigo fall victim to the plot, the Ryusoulgers will have to enter cyberspace in order to save them.
26	"The Seventh Knight"; Transliteration: "Nana-nin-me no Kishi" (Japanese: 7人目の騎士)	Junpei Yamaoka	September 15, 2019
Seemingly out of nowhere, another member of the Ryusoul Tribe and Koh's fellow student, Nada, appears before the Ryusoulgers and asks to join them in their fight against the Druidon. When Koh is taken down by their enemies' latest Minosaur, he suddenly feels he is not worthy to be a Ryusoulger and considers passing the title of Ryusoul Red to Nada.
27	"The Unrivaled Fists"; Transliteration: "Tenka Musō no Kobushi" (Japanese: 天下無双の拳)	Junpei Yamaoka	September 22, 2019
Nada leads the Ryusoulgers to the resting place of the kangaroo-like Kishiryu, Pachygaroo, and encounter its child, Chibigaroo. While they attempt to break the Kishiryu's seal, an apparently resurrected Gachireus suddenly appears and buries them alive.
28	"A Micro Offense and Defense"; Transliteration: "Mikuro no Kōbō" (Japanese: ミクロの攻防)	Naruhisa Arakawa	September 29, 2019
Kleon manages to sneak a microscopic Minosaur into Asuna's body, forcing Koh to shrink down in order to save her. However, his efforts are complicated when he finds that the monster's tail is tied around Asuna's heart, meaning he is unable to kill it without killing her at the same time.
29	"Canalo's Marriage"; Transliteration: "Kanaro no Kekkon" (Japanese: カナロの結婚)	Hiroya Taka	October 6, 2019
Canalo meets a woman named Yui and chooses to marry her on the spot, causing the other Ryusoulgers to believe he is leaving them just as they are forced to contend with a Minosaur throwing poisonous garbage all over the city.
30	"Overthrow! High Spec"; Transliteration: "Datō! Kō Supekku" (Japanese: 打倒！高スペック)	Ayumi Shimo	October 13, 2019
Towa and Bamba learn that Nada is Gaisoulg, but Koh refuses to believe his friend has succumbed to evil and tries to get close to him. Just then, Wiserue sends a "high spec" Minosaur to attack the Ryusoulgers, but Gaisoulg joins the fray to seemingly aid the latter against it.
31	"A Melody from the Sky"; Transliteration: "Sora kara no Merodi" (Japanese: 空からのメロディ)	Junpei Yamaoka	October 20, 2019
After a flying Minosaur entrances everyone in the city, including most of the Ryusoulgers, the unaffected Canalo and Oto as well as an injured Koh have to locate a sky Kishiryu in order to combat their airborne foe all while Nada and the Druidon continue to hinder their efforts.
32	"When the Rain of Hatred Stops Coming Down"; Transliteration: "Zōo no Ame ga Yamu Toki" (Japanese: 憎悪の雨が止む時)	Junpei Yamaoka	October 27, 2019
Even in spite of all that Nada has done, Koh firmly considers him a Ryusoulger and fights to save him from the Gaisoulg armor just as it starts to take over his body. Meanwhile, Gachireus goes on the attack alongside a Minosaur capable of spreading a rainbow-colored rain that causes people to go mad with anger and attack each other.
33	"A New Assassin"; Transliteration: "Aratanaru Shikaku" (Japanese: 新たなる刺客)	Junpei Yamaoka	November 10, 2019
Just as Koh helped free Nada from the Gaisoulg armor, a Druidon assassin called Uden attacks the Ryusoulgers one by one; using his powers to absorb them and steal their attacks. Vowing to make amends for what he did as Gaisoulg, Nada attempts to use the armor's power to save his friends from their latest foe. Amidst the battle, Nada sacrifices himself to save Koh and grant him the power of the Max Ryusoul so the latter can defeat Uden and save the others.
34	"The Evil Space Dragon Appears!"; Transliteration: "Uchū Kyōryū Arawaru!" (Japanese: 宇宙凶竜現る！)	Naruhisa Arakawa	November 17, 2019
The Ryusoulgers get word that a giant space dragon is coming to Earth, along with another Druidon general, Pricious, who betrays both Wiserue and Gachireus to use the Space Dragon to destroy their enemies. To overcome the challenge ahead of them, the Ryusoulgers will have to challenge a long-standing Ryusoul Tribe tradition to obtain more power.
35	"The Greatest Battle on Earth"; Transliteration: "Chikyū Saidai no Kessen" (Japanese: 地球最大の決戦)	Naruhisa Arakawa	November 24, 2019
As Pricious and his Space Dragon continue wreaking havoc, the Ryusoulgers struggle to overcome the Cliffs of Trials in order to unlock the most powerful Ryusoul combination, with Koh in particular experiencing the most difficulty.
36	"The High-Speed Bodyguard"; Transliteration: "Chōsoku no Bodigādo" (Japanese: 超速のボディガード)	Ayumi Shimo	December 1, 2019
Following their battles with Pricious, the Ryusoulgers strive to train harder in order to defeat their latest foe. However, Towa fails to appear for training and to stop a Minosaur attack. When they investigate, the Ryusoulgers find him on a date.
37	"Birth! The Most Fearsome Tag Team"; Transliteration: "Tanjō! Saikyō Taggu" (Japanese: 誕生！最恐タッグ)	Kaori Kaneko	December 8, 2019
After Tyramigo accidentally injures a child, he and Koh butt heads over what happened. Just then, Wiserue and Gachireus join forces to overwhelm the Ryusoulgers, and the only way they can stop them is to help the quarreling red champions settle their differences.
38	"The Temple in the Sky"; Transliteration: "Tenkū no Shinden" (Japanese: 天空の神殿)	Hiroya Taka	December 15, 2019
Taking advice from the spirit of deceased Ryusoul Tribesman, Seto, the Ryusoulgers seek out the Temple of the Beginning, which only Koh and Canalo are able to enter as they undergo numerous tests. Meanwhile, given one last chance by Pricious to prove himself, Gachireus attacks the city with a Minosaur spawned from his own body. Upon completing the temple's trials, the Ryusoulgers gain the Ryusoul Caliber, which they use to defeat Gachireus once and for all.
39	"The Stolen Holy Night"; Transliteration: "Ubawareta Seiya" (Japanese: 奪われた聖夜)	Hiroya Taka	December 22, 2019
With Christmas on the horizon, the Ryusoulgers and Kishiryu are in high spirits. Meanwhile, a jealous Wiserue plots to kidnap all the Santas in the city for being more popular than him and creates a Minosaur capable of transforming Christmas decorations into New Year's decorations.
40	"The Nightmare Within the Fog"; Transliteration: "Kiri no Naka no Akumu" (Japanese: 霧の中の悪夢)	Junpei Yamaoka	January 5, 2020
While a strange fog blankets the city and causes strange phenomena, a Minosaur that has tormented Melto in his dreams suddenly appears in the real world to feed on the Ryusoulgers' fear and become invincible.
41	"The Missing Sacred Sword"; Transliteration: "Kieta Seiken" (Japanese: 消えた聖剣)	Junpei Yamaoka	January 12, 2020
After being cast in a feature film, the Ryusoulgers frantically search for the Ryusoul Caliber when it goes missing; eventually finding it in the clutches of Saden, a new Druidon general who has the power to steal their weapons right out of their hands.
42	"The Decisive Battle Stage"; Transliteration: "Kessen no Sutēji" (Japanese: 決戦のステージ)	Ayumi Shimo	January 19, 2020
The Druidons' leader, Eras, is due to revive any day now. Before that happens, Wiserue sets out to capture the Ryusoulgers and destroy them to prove himself worthy to the Druidon cause.
43	"The Mother of the Druidons"; Transliteration: "Doruidon no Haha" (Japanese: ドルイドンの母)	Junpei Yamaoka	January 26, 2020
As Eras begins to revive, the Druidon intensify their attacks while the Ryusoulgers attempt to learn more about their enemies' leader. After hearing Eras' name, Bamba remembers how his mentor, Master Black, turned traitor and destroyed their village to protect the Druidon leader.
44	"The Tested Bond"; Transliteration: "Tamesareta Kizuna" (Japanese: 試されたキズナ)	Junpei Yamaoka	February 2, 2020
As Saden holds Oto hostage and demands the Ryusoul Caliber in exchange, Eras creates another Druidon general, Yabasword. The Ryusoulgers respond by splitting into two groups, with one holding off Pricious' forces while the other storms the Druidon's lair to destroy Eras.
45	"Get the Heart Back!"; Transliteration: "Shinzō o Torimodose!" (Japanese: 心臓を取り戻せ！)	Junpei Yamaoka	February 9, 2020
Even with Pricious in control of his heart, Master Black suddenly appears before Bamba and demands to see Seto. Meanwhile, armed with the truth behind Eras' resurrection, the Ryusoulgers move forward with a plan to stop her and the Druidon once and for all.
46	"The Noble Kishiryu"; Transliteration: "Kedakaki Kishiryū-tachi" (Japanese: 気高き騎士竜たち)	Junpei Yamaoka	February 16, 2020
After Pricious learns the true nature of the Druidon Tribe from Eras, he faces the Ryusoulgers as they learned the only way to reseal Eras is by sacrificing their Kishiryu partners.
47	"Between Happiness and Despair"; Transliteration: "Shiawase to Zetsubō no Hazama de" (Japanese: 幸福と絶望の間で)	Junpei Yamaoka	February 23, 2020
Now that she has fully revived, Eras attacks the Ryusoulgers and sends them into a peaceful world without conflict. While exploring this new world, the six knights find themselves questioning the true meaning of peace, why they are fighting as Ryusoulgers, and what Eras is really after.
48 (Final)	"Earth's Will"; Transliteration: "Chikyū no Ishi" (Japanese: 地球の意思)	Junpei Yamaoka	March 1, 2020
Free of Eras' perfect world and of their hesitations, the Ryusoulgers and their Kishiryu face off against the Druidon leader in a battle to determine the Earth's fate.
