= Kishiryu Sentai Ryusoulger VS Lupinranger VS Patranger the Movie =

- Kanji: 騎士竜戦隊リュウソウジャーVSルパンレンジャーVSパトレンジャー
- Revised Hepburn: Kishiryū Sentai Ryūsōjā Bui Esu Rupanrenjā Bui Esu Patorenjā
- Directed by: Katsuya Watanabe
- Written by: Junko Kōmura; Naruhisa Arakawa
- Produced by: Shinya Maruyama; Kazuhiro Takahashi; Masayuki Yamada
- Starring: Hayate Ichinose; Keito Tsuna; Ichika Osaki; Yuito Obara; Tatsuya Kishida; Katsumi Hyodo; Sora Tamaki; Asahi Itou; Shogo Hama; Haruka Kudō; Kousei Yuki; Ryo Yokoyama; Kazusa Okuyama; Seiya Motoki
- Music by: Kiyoshi Yoshikawa; Hiroshi Takaki
- Production companies: Toei Company; TV Asahi; Toei Video; Toei Agency; Bandai
- Distributed by: Toei Company
- Release date: February 8, 2020
- Running time: 55 minutes
- Country: Japan
- Language: Japanese

Kishiryu Sentai Ryusoulger VS Lupinranger VS Patranger (騎士竜戦隊リュウソウジャーVSルパンレンジャーVSパトレンジャー, Kishiryū Sentai Ryūsōjā Bui Esu Rupanrenjā Bui Esu Patorenjā) is a 2020 Japanese film featuring the casts of Kishiryu Sentai Ryusoulger and Kaitou Sentai Lupinranger VS Keisatsu Sentai Patranger. It was double-billed with the prelude film for Mashin Sentai Kiramager. It was released in Japanese theaters on February 8, 2020 as part of Super Sentai Movie Party (スーパー戦隊MOVIEパーティー, Sūpā Sentai Mūbī Pātī).

== Production ==
The film was announced on December 21, 2019.

== Plot ==
Kleon plans to set up his own hideout in a cave, but he discovers a monster imprisoned in that cave. Impressed with his negative emotion, Kleon decides to release him.

Somewhere else in the forest, Koh is trying to clean Kishiryu Tyramigo's body with water, much to Tyramigo's dismay. They fight and Tyramigo storms off. Koh is then approached by Noël Takao, who is seeking a member of the Ryusoul Tribe, but they're cut off by a scream from Tyramigo's. Tyramigo is attacked and tied up by Griffon Minosaur. Koh comes to his aid and transforms to fight the monster. As the other 4 Ryusoulgers arrive, Ganima Noshiagalda appears and captures Tyramigo in one of his safes. Having followed the Ryusoulgers, Noël comes and realizes that he is a Gangler. Using MieSoul, they discover that Ganima has also captured Kishiryu DimeVolcano, Kishiryu Pachygaroo & Kishiryu Chibigaroo, Kishiryu MosaRex and Kishiryu Pterardon. The Ryusoulgers engage the Gangler, but he invokes the power of DimeVolcano to knock them back. Noël tries to use a Dial Fighter to open one of his safes, but he cannot, as the Quintuple safes must be simultaneously unlocked. With the new powers, Ganima Noshiagalda declares himself the new boss of the Gangler. Impressed, Kleon decides to join the Gangler, so Ganima Noshiagalda gives him a secret mission. Ryusoul Red stands up and charges at Ganima, but he uses the power of Pachygaroo & Chibigaroo to blow him away before leaving through a Back World portal.

Towa and Bamba chase after the Minosaur, while Asuna and Melt take Noël to their hideout. The latter explains that he is looking for a Lupin Collection piece Arsène Lupin traded to the Ryusoul Tribe when Ganima attacked. Having never heard of Arsène, they try reaching out to Canalo, who is in the middle of an encounter with Tsukasa Myoujin. Meanwhile, Towa and Bamba lose the Minosaur, and their use of swords in public frightens bystanders. They are then intercepted by Keiichiro Asaka and Sakuya Hikawa, who arrest them for illegally carrying weapons. Meanwhile, Koh lands in front of the warehouse where Kairi Yano is sheltering, who is interested in his Ryusoul Ken.

Kairi brings Koh inside and patches him up. When Koh regains consciousness, he thanks Kairi, but the thief refuses to return his sword, so they get into a fight. Kairi receives confirmation from Kogure that the Ryusoul Ken isn't a Lupin Treasure, so he returns the blade and listens to Koh's story, which resonates with him. Keiichiro and Sakuya interrogate the Ryusoul Brothers with little success. Sakuya nearly gets through to Towa, but Bamba loses patience and breaks out. As Koh and Kairi talk, Griffon Minosaur appears and attacks Kairi. He struggles against the monster's aerial attacks, so Koh uses KakureSoul to hide them. Once the Minosaur leaves, Kairi gets a call from Noël about Ganima.

Noël shows Asuna and Melt the power of the Dial Fighters and summons Kairi, Umika Hayami, and Touma Yoimachi to help, but the latter two are sidetracked. Umika stops to help Oto, who was nearby doing a favor for Asuna, and Touma is prevented from leaving his cafe when Tsukasa brings Canalo there. Both groups talk amicably, but Kleon comes for Umika, having been ordered to take her Lupin Collection pieces. Griffon Minosaur attacks Touma's Cafe, but Canalo and Tsukasa both change and chase it away. The two are intercepted by Bamba, Towa, Keiichiro, and Sakuya. Ganima and his Minosaur start attacking the city, and Ryusoul Red, Blue, and Pink gather to fight, followed by the other Ryusoulgers and the Patrangers, who convinced them to cooperate. Umika and Oto run into Touma and the two thieves fight off Kleon and his Drun Soldiers before leaving Oto to join Kari and Noël. At the battle, Ryusoul Red Max tries to finish off Ganima, but Noël jumps into the fight and takes the hit, warning that destroying him without opening the safes will kill the Kishiryu.

The Patrangers try to hold Ganima back until the remaining Lupinrangers arrive, but the Gangler uses Tyramigo's power to evolve his safes into Gold Safes. The Patrangers and Ryusoulgers are unable to stop the Gangler from leaving, with the promise he will wipe out half the planet the next day. They two teams regroup to strategize, but since only eight Dial Fighters exist and there is no time to make more, the group agrees to destroy Ganima and the Kishiryu before more destruction occurs. Despite having no options, Koh is against the plan and leaves to think. Kairi shows up and tells Koh he shouldn't give up on what he feels is right. At the hideout, Asuna gives Noël the Ryusoul Tribe's Lupin Treasure, which gives him an idea about how to handle Ganima.

The next day, Ganima prepares to level the city, but the Ryusoulgers intercept them. The team prepares to destroy him, but Koh refuses to go through with it, as he is unwilling to give up on saving the Kishiryu. The others agree to support him, and the Lupinrangers, having seen their conviction, step in to fight alongside them. The Patrangers also arrive, having convinced their superiors to let them fight. The three Sentai change and charge into battle. The Ryusoulgers and the VS Sentai trade weapons to defeat a combined force of Pordermen and Drun Soldiers, and the Lupinrangers loan their Dial Fighters to Ryusouls Red, Blue, and Pink. Lupin X then gives them a new tool to help them open Ganima's safes: Ryusouls infused with the power of Dial Fighters. Using them, the three Ryusoulsgers change into Lupinrangers with copies of the Dial Fighters. Using the extra Fighters, the group is able to free the Kishiryu. They then combine their finishers to destroy Ganima and Griffon Minosaur, and Kleon flees when he sees the tides change.

In the aftermath, Koh and Tyramigo make up, Keiichiro and Bamba start arguing, and Canalo gets rejected by Tsukasa. Touma agrees to make food for Asuna, and Canalo sets his sights on Umika, only to start fighting over her with Sakuya.

== Cast ==
Ryusoulger cast

- Koh (コウ, Kō): Hayate Ichinose (一ノ瀬 颯, Ichinose Hayate)
- Melto (メルト, Meruto): Keito Tsuna (綱 啓永, Tsuna Keito)
- Asuna (アスナ): Ichika Osaki (尾碕 真花, Osaki Ichika)
- Towa (トワ): Yuito Obara (小原 唯和, Obara Yuito)
- Bamba (バンバ, Banba): Tatsuya Kishida (岸田 タツヤ, Kishida Tatsuya)
- Canalo (カナロ, Kanaro): Katsumi Hyodo (兵頭 功海, Hyōdō Katsumi)
- Oto (オト): Sora Tamaki (田牧 そら, Tamaki Sora)

Lupinranger VS Patranger cast

- Kairi Yano (夜野 魁利, Yano Kairi): Asahi Itou (伊藤 あさひ, Itō Asahi)
- Touma Yoimachi (宵町 透真, Yoimachi Tōma): Shogo Hama (濱 正悟, Hama Shōgo)
- Umika Hayami (早見 初美花, Hayami Umika): Haruka Kudō (工藤 遥, Kudō Haruka)
- Keiichiro Asaka (朝加 圭一郎, Asaka Keiichirō): Kousei Yuki (結木 滉星, Yūki Kōsei)
- Sakuya Hikawa (陽川 咲也, Hikawa Sakuya): Ryo Yokoyama (横山 涼, Yokoyama Ryō)
- Tsukasa Myoujin (明神 つかさ, Myōjin Tsukasa): Kazusa Okuyama (奥山 かずさ, Okuyama Kazusa)
- Noël Takao (高尾 ノエル, Takao Noeru): Seiya Motoki (元木 聖也, Motoki Seiya)

Voice cast

- Jim Carter (ジム・カーター, Jimu Kātā): Rie Kugimiya (釘宮 理恵, Kugimiya Rie)
- Kleon (クレオン, Kureon): Ryoko Shiraishi (白石 涼子, Shiraishi Ryōko)
- Tyramigo (ティラミーゴ, Tiramīgo): Masaki Terasoma (てらそま まさき, Terasoma Masaki)
- MosaRex (モサレックス, Mosarekkusu): Ryōta Takeuchi (竹内 良太, Takeuchi Ryōta)
- DimeVolcano (ディメボルケーノ, Dimeborukēno): Wataru Takagi (高木 渉, Takagi Wataru)
- Pii-tan (ピーたん, Pītan): Takeshi Kusao (草尾 毅, Kusao Takeshi)
- Chibigaroo (チビガルー, Chibigarū): M·A·O
- Ganima Noshiagalda (ガニマ・ノシアガルダ, Ganima Noshiagaruda): Akio Ōtsuka (大塚 明夫, Ōtsuka Akio)
