= Papaya Suzuki =

Japanese celebrity (born 1966)

Suzuki at a press event for Kamen Rider Zi-O the Movie: Over Quartzer in 2019

Hiroshi Suzuki (鈴木 寛, Suzuki Hiroshi; born 29 June 1966 in Higashikurume, Tokyo), better known by his stage name Papaya Suzuki (パパイヤ鈴木, Papaiya Suzuki), is a Japanese celebrity most famous for his dancing and for his afro hairstyle.

He originally intended to be a singer, but gave up due to a drastic gain in weight. According to his official web site, he is 178 cm tall, and weighs 108 kg. He is now a choreographer and dancer, and he is a member of the dancing group Oyaji dancers, where oyaji is a faintly derogatory Japanese word literally meaning "dad" but also used for middle-aged men in general.

He also works as an actor, a lyricist, and a songwriter, as well as arranging and producing music.

Suzuki made a brief appearance as a dancer in the video for the song O! O! Xsta Si ( Boom Boom Love ) by the J-pop group Deeps.

He was the choreographer for one of AKB48's biggest hits: "Koisuru Fortune Cookie" (2013).
