= Yuito Obara =

Japanese actor and fashion model (born 2002)

- 小原 唯和
- Obara at a press event for Kamen Rider Zi-O the Movie: Over Quartzer in 2019
- Born: April 2, 2002 (age 24); Matsue, Shimane Prefecture, Japan
- Occupations: Actor; model
- Years active: 2016–present
- Notable work: Kishiryu Sentai Ryusoulger as Towa/Ryusou Green

Yuito Obara (Japanese: 小原 唯和, born April 2, 2002) is a Japanese actor and fashion model. He was a finalist in the 28th Junon Superboy Contest.

== Career ==
He entered the world of entertainment after becoming a finalist in the Junon Super Boy Contest in 2015. He is also a fashion model in the fashion magazine nicola.

In 2017, he made his debut as an actor in the TV drama Anata no Koto ha Sorehodo as Mitsuru Arishima during middle school.

Obara has played the roles of Towa and Ryusoul Green in the Super Sentai series. In 2019, he played in the television dramas Super Sentai Strongest Battle as Ryusou Green and in Kishiryu Sentai Ryusoulger as Towa and Ryusou Green. The same year he played Towa and Ryusou Green in the movie Kishiryu Sentai Ryusoulger The Movie: Time Slip! Kyōryū Panic!!. In 2020, he played the same two roles in Kishiryu Sentai Ryusoulger VS Lupinranger VS Patranger, and in 2021 in Kishiryu Sentai Ryusoulger Special Chapter: Memory of Soulmates.

== Filmography ==
=== Films ===
Year	Title	Role	Notes	Ref.
2018	Does the Flower Blossom?	Shōta Minagawa		
2018	Over Drive	Atsuhiro Hiyama (teen)		
2019	Aiuta -Yakusoku no Nakuhito-			
2019	Kishiryu Sentai Ryusoulger The Movie: Time Slip! Kyōryū Panic!!	Towa/Ryusoul Green	Super Sentai series	
2020	Kishiryu Sentai Ryusoulger VS Lupinranger VS Patranger	Towa/Ryusoul Green	Super Sentai series	
2021	Kishiryu Sentai Ryusoulger Special Chapter: Memory of Soulmates	Towa/Ryusoul Green	Super Sentai series	

=== Television dramas ===
Year	Title	Role	Notes	Ref(s)
2017	Anata no Koto ha Sorehodo	Mitsuru Arishima		
2017	Aishitatte Himitsu ha aru	Rei Okumori		
2018	AIBOU: Tokyo Detective Duo	Tomohiro Shiina		
2018	Shitsuji Saionji no Meisuiri	Mizuki Yukimura		
2018	Signal	Yōichi Ogawa		
2019	Super Sentai Strongest Battle	Ryusoul Green	Super Sentai series	
2019	Kishiryu Sentai Ryusoulger	Towa/Ryusoul Green	Super Sentai series	
2020	Tokusō Nine	Noboru Shikura	Super Sentai series	

=== Web series ===
Year	Title	Role	Notes	Ref(s)
2022	&Bishōjo Next Girl meets Tokyo	Kenta Miyazaki		
