= So Okuno =

Japanese actor

- 奥野壮
- Okuno at a press event for Kamen Rider Zi-O the Movie: Over Quartzer in 2019
- Born: 21 August 2000 (age 26); Neyagawa, Osaka, Japan
- Occupations: Actor; dancer
- Years active: 2018–present
- Agent: Oscar Promotion
- Website: oscar-aox.jp

So Okuno (奥野 壮, Okuno Sō), is a Japanese actor and dancer who is known for his portrayal of Sougo Tokiwa in Kamen Rider Zi-O and Hayato Shinomiya in Kiss Him, Not Me. He is a member of Oscar Promotion's acting troupe Aoyama Omotesando X.

== Career ==
Okuno won the 30th Junon Superboy Contest with over 17,000 applicants in 2017. In 2018 he was cast to play Sougo Tokiwa in Kamen Rider Zi-O. According to producer Shinichiro Shirakura, it was particularly difficult to cast a young man who could properly portray Sougo's kingly aura. He said that Okuno was eventually chosen due to his unique outlook on the world, and considered it an act of fate. Okuno dropped out of high school when he was cast as Sougo Tokiwa. He trained in classical ballet for over 11 years and has incorporated some of it into his transformation pose and Zi-O's fighting skills.

Okuno says that he is very optimistic about life like Sougo, but doesn't have the skills to communicate with "everyone".

Okuno's hobbies include reading manga and playing video games. His favorite Rider is Kamen Rider Kiva.

== Filmography ==
=== Films ===
Year	Title	Role	Notes	Ref.
2018	Kamen Rider Build the Movie: Be the One	Sogo Tokiwa/Kamen Rider Zi-O	Voice role, cameo	
2018	Kamen Rider Heisei Generations Forever	Sogo Tokiwa/Kamen Rider Zi-O	Lead role	
2019	Kamen Rider Zi-O the Movie: Over Quartzer	Sogo Tokiwa/Kamen Rider Zi-O	Lead role	
2019	Kamen Rider Reiwa The First Generation	Sogo Tokiwa/Kamen Rider Zi-O	Lead role	
2020	Kamen Rider Zi-O Next Time: Geiz Majesty	Sogo Tokiwa/Kamen Rider Zi-O		
2021	Pornographer: Playback	Shizuo Akemi		
2021	Saber + Zenkaiger: Super Hero Senki	Sogo Tokiwa/Kamen Rider Zi-O		
2022	Haiiro no Kabe	Masaki	Lead role	
2022	The Setting Sun			
2026	Mystery Arena	Butsumetsu		

=== Television drama ===
Year	Title	Role	Notes	Ref.
2018	Kamen Rider Zi-O	Sogo Tokiwa/Kamen Rider Zi-O & Mirror World Sogo (episodes 21 and 22 only)	Lead role and guest role	
2026	Sins of Kujo	Daiki Terayama		
2026	Tonight, I Have a Date with a Serial Killer	Shinichi Makino		
2027	The Shogunate Rebel	Emperor Meiji	Taiga drama	

== See also ==
- List of Japanese actors
