= Ryo Yokoyama =

Japanese actor

- 横山 涼
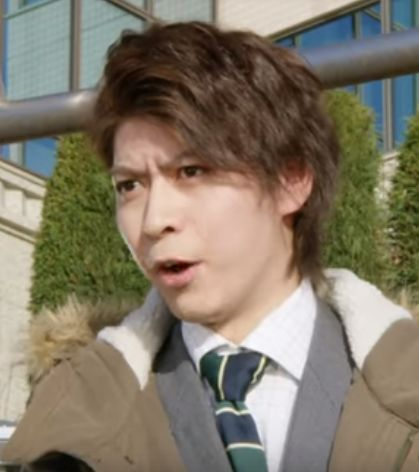
- Born: 7 March 1995 (age 30); Tokyo, Japan
- Occupation: Actor
- Years active: 2004–present
- Agent: A-team
- Notable work: Lesson of the Evil
- Website: Ryo Yokoyama A-Team.Inc

Ryo Yokoyama (横山 涼, Yokoyama Ryō, born 7 March 1995 in Tokyo, Japan) is a Japanese actor. He is represented with A-team.

== Appearances ==
=== TV dramas ===
- My High School Business (NTV, 2017), Year 3 Class 3 student, Kohei Aoyagi
- Kaitou Sentai Lupinranger VS Keisatsu Sentai Patranger (TV Asahi, 2018), Sakuya Hikawa/Patren 2gou
- Sign (TV Asahi, 2019), Eiji Kitami
- Nippon Noir: Detective Y's rebellion (NTV, 2019), Takashi Mazezono (Detective)
- Wasteful Days of High School Girls (TV Asahi, 2020), Officer Police

=== Films ===
- Lesson of the Evil (2012) – as Daisuke Shiomi
- Kaitou Sentai Lupinranger VS Keisatsu Sentai Patranger en Film (2018) as Hikawa Sakuya/Patren
- Lupinranger VS Patranger VS Kyuranger (2019) as Hikawa Sakuya/Patren
- Kishiryu Sentai Ryusoulger VS Lupinranger VS Patranger the Movie (2020) as Hikawa Sakuya/Patren
- The Rightman (2025)

=== Stage ===
- Picture × Read Aloud Sakura Yuki –Aru Yuki Onna no Monogatari–
- Tacphes Special Performance What a wonderful life!
