= Keito Tsuna =

Japanese actor

- 綱啓永
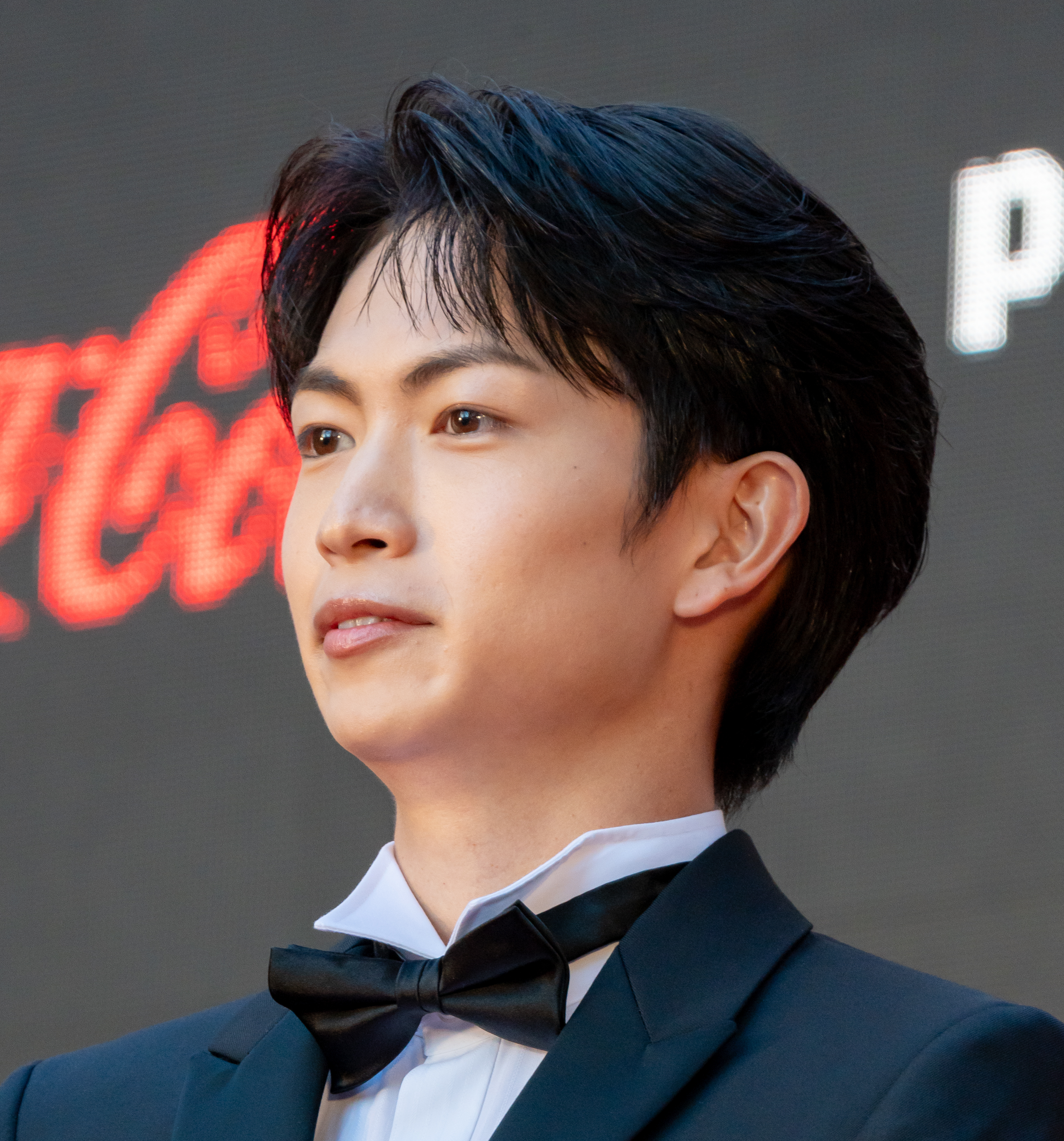
- Tsuna in 2023
- Born: December 24, 1998 (age 27); Funabashi, Chiba, Japan
- Education: Nihon University
- Occupation: Actor
- Years active: 2018–present

Keito Tsuna (綱啓永, Tsuna Keito; born December 24, 1998 in Funabashi, Chiba) is a Japanese actor working for Watanabe Entertainment.

== Biography and career ==
In 2017, Tsuna participated in the Junon Superboy Grand Prix and won.

In March 2018, he signed with the talent agency Watanabe Entertainment and debuted in the drama series Bungaku Shojo.

In January 2019, he joined the cast of Kishiryu Sentai Ryusoulger.

Tsuna is an engineering student at Nihon University.

== Filmography ==
=== TV series ===
Year	Title	Role	Notes	Ref.
2018	Bungaku Shojo	Ryunosuke Kawabata	Debut role	
2019	Kishiryu Sentai Ryusoulger	Melto / Ryusoul Blue		
2020	Homeroom	Ken Yahagi		
2020	Marry Me!	Makoto Mitsugi		
2022	I Will Be Your Bloom	Yukiya Furumachi		

=== Film ===
Year	Title	Role	Notes	Ref.
2020	Kishiryu Sentai Ryusoulger VS Lupinranger VS Patranger the Movie	Melto		
2021	The Magic of Chocolate			
2024	Take Me to Another Planet	Mo		
2024	Lovesick Ellie	Reo Takagi		
2024	The Scoop	Matsuyama		
2025	True Beauty: Before	Yu Igarashi		
2025	True Beauty: After	Yu Igarashi		
2025	Nemurubaka: Hypnic Jerks	Taguchi		
2025	#Iwilltellyouthetruth	Company employee		
2025	Yoyogi Johnny			
2025	Wind Breaker	Hayato Suō		
2026	Kyojo: Reunion	Kadota		
2026	Kyojo: Requiem	Kadota		
2026	Tokyo Strayers	Ed		
2026	The Mouths	Tatsuya		
2026	Blue Lock	Reo Mikage		
