= Shogo Hama =

Japanese actor (born 1994)

- 濱 正悟
- Born: 22 August 1994 (age 32); Tokyo, Japan
- Education: Meiji University
- Occupation: Actor
- Years active: 2014–present

Shogo Hama (濱 正悟, Hama Shōgo; born 22 August 1994) is a Japanese actor.

== Biography ==
Hama was born in Tokyo. In 2014, he won the Sony Music × smart Model Audition Second Prize Grand Prix. The next year, he won Girls Award Award x avex Boys Award Audition Special Prize. In 2018, he was cast in the role of Touma Yoimachi/Lupin Blue on 42nd Super Sentai series Kaitou Sentai Lupinranger VS Keisatsu Sentai Patranger.

== Selected filmography ==
=== Television ===
| Year | Title | Role | Notes | Ref. |
|---|---|---|---|---|
| 2018 | Kaitou Sentai Lupinranger VS Keisatsu Sentai Patranger | Touma Yoimachi / Lupin Blue (voice) | | |
| 2022 | The Aromantics | Hajime Matsuoka | | |
| 2022 | The 13 Lords of the Shogun | Taira no Koremori | Taiga drama | |
| 2022 | Soar High! | Shin'ichi Nakazawa | Asadora | |
| 2024 | Love Is a Poison | Shiba Ryoma | Lead role | |
| 2025 | Even Though We're Adults | Ayumu | | |
| 2025–26 | The Ghost Writer's Wife | Takichi Shoda | Asadora | |
| 2026 | Song of the Samurai | Saeki Matasaburo | | |
| 2026 | Brothers in Arms | Mōri Terumoto | Taiga drama | |

=== Films ===
| Year | Title | Role | Notes | Ref. |
|---|---|---|---|---|
| 2020 | Kishiryu Sentai Ryusoulger VS Lupinranger VS Patranger the Movie | Touma Yoimachi / Lupin Blue (voice) | | |
| 2020 | The Samejima Incident | Ryō | | |
| 2021 | Napoleon and Me | Napoleon | | |
| 2022 | Haiiro no Kabe | Mamase | | |
| 2023 | Manami 100% | Fujii | | |
| 2024 | Love is Outdated | Kazuki | Lead role | |
| 2026 | Matched: True Love | Katsuhiko Ichijo | | |
