= Kishiryu Sentai Ryusoulger =

Japanese television drama

- Genre: Tokusatsu; Superhero fiction; Action; Fantasy; Comedy-Drama
- Created by: TV Asahi; Toei Company
- Written by: Junpei Yamaoka; Ayumi Shimo; Naruhisa Arakawa; Akatsuki Yamatoya; Kaori Kaneko; Hiroya Taka
- Directed by: Kazuya Kamihoriuchi; Shojiro Nakazawa Katsuya Watanabe; Koichi Sakamoto; Hiroki Kashiwagi; Hiroyuki Katō
- Starring: Hayate Ichinose; Keito Tsuna; Ichika Osaki; Yuito Obara; Tatsuya Kishida; Katsumi Hyodo; Sora Tamaki; Seiya Osada; Mitsuru Fukikoshi; Mana Kinjo
- Narrated by: Kazuya Ichijō
- Opening theme: "Kishiryu Sentai Ryusoulger"; Performed by Tomohiro Hatano
- Ending theme: "Que Booom! Ryusoulger"; Performed by Sister Mayo
- Composer: Kiyoshi Yoshikawa
- Country of origin: Japan
- Original language: Japanese
- No. of episodes: 48 (list of episodes)

Production
- Executive producer: Motoi Sasaki (TV Asahi)
- Producers: Chihiro Inoue (TV Asahi); Ayumi Kanno (TV Asahi); Shinya Maruyama (Toei); Kazuhiro Takahashi (Toei); Kōichi Yada (Toei Agency); Akihiro Fukada (Toei Agency)
- Production location: Tokyo, Japan (Greater Tokyo Area)
- Running time: 24–25 minutes
- Production companies: TV Asahi; Toei Company; Toei Agency

Original release
- Network: TV Asahi
- Release: March 17, 2019 – March 1, 2020

Related
- Kaitou Sentai Lupinranger VS Keisatsu Sentai Patranger; Super Sentai Strongest Battle; Mashin Sentai Kiramager

Kishiryu Sentai Ryusoulger (騎士竜戦隊リュウソウジャー, Kishiryū Sentai Ryūsōjā; Knightosaur Squadron Ryusoulger) (Note: The term Kishiryū (騎士竜) when literally translated means "Knight Dragon". For the series' purposes, "kishiryu" is a portmanteau of the Japanese words Kishi (騎士, "knight") and Kyōryū (恐竜, "dinosaur"), which roughly translates into English as "Knightosaur".) is a Japanese tokusatsu drama and the 43rd entry of the Toei Company's long-running Super Sentai series. Although the series primarily aired in the Reiwa era, it is considered the final Heisei era series as it began airing during it. (Note: Choujyu Sentai Liveman, the first series to air through two different Japanese eras, aired 43 of its 49 episodes during the Showa era and its last six episodes in the Heisei era. As such, it is considered a Showa series. Despite Ryusoulger being billed as the first Reiwa era Super Sentai series, it is considered a Heisei series as the first seven episodes aired during that era and series are based on the era when the series started to maintain consistency.) It is also the fourth and final Super Sentai series to utilize the motif of dinosaurs, (Note: Other official dinosaur-themed Super Sentai include Kyōryū Sentai Zyuranger, Bakuryū Sentai Abaranger, and Zyuden Sentai Kyoryuger.) as well as the only one to utilize the motif of knights.

It aired from March 17, 2019, to March 1, 2020, replacing Kaitou Sentai Lupinranger VS Keisatsu Sentai Patranger and Super Sentai Strongest Battle and was replaced by Mashin Sentai Kiramager. The program joining Kamen Rider Zi-O, later Kamen Rider Zero-One, in the Super Hero Time line-up on TV Asahi affiliate stations. Additionally, Ryusoulger began airing in South Korea in August 2019 as Power Rangers Dino Soul and its footage was adapted for Power Rangers Dino Fury.

== Story ==
65 million years ago, the knights of the Ryusoul Tribe were selected to participate in a war campaign against the dictating Druidon Tribe who sought to rule Earth. But the Druidon's war campaign was halted by the meteor that brought the age of the dinosaurs to an end, forcing them to flee into space. Meanwhile, the Kishiryu were placed in a deep sleep as a failsafe should the Druidon return. The chosen knights choose to live in peace while passing their mantle down across generations. In the present day, the Druidon return to reclaim Earth as the current generation of knights, the brand new Ryusoulgers, battle them with the support of Ui Tatsui and her father Naohisa Tatsui.

== Episodes ==
No.	English title Original Japanese title	Written by	Original release date
1	"Que Booom!! Ryusoulger"; Transliteration: "Kebōn! Ryūsōjā" (Japanese: ケボーン!!竜装者(リュウソウジャー))	Junpei Yamaoka	March 17, 2019
2	"With Souls as One"; Transliteration: "Sōru o Hitotsu ni" (Japanese: ソウルをひとつに)	Junpei Yamaoka	March 24, 2019
3	"The Cursed Gaze"; Transliteration: "Noroi no Shisen" (Japanese: 呪いの視線)	Junpei Yamaoka	March 31, 2019
4	"'Saur and Tiger!! The Fastest Battle"; Transliteration: "Ryūko!! Saisoku Batoru" (Japanese: 竜虎！！最速バトル)	Junpei Yamaoka	April 7, 2019
5	"Hell's Watchdog"; Transliteration: "Jigoku no Banken" (Japanese: 地獄の番犬)	Junpei Yamaoka	April 14, 2019
6	"Counterattack!! Tankjoh"; Transliteration: "Gyakushū!! Tankujō" (Japanese: 逆襲!!タンクジョウ)	Junpei Yamaoka	April 21, 2019
7	"The Princesses of Planet Cepeus"; Transliteration: "Kepeusu-sei no Ōjo" (Japanese: ケペウス星の王女)	Junpei Yamaoka	April 28, 2019
8	"The Miraculous Singing Voice"; Transliteration: "Kiseki no Utagoe" (Japanese: 奇跡の歌声)	Junpei Yamaoka	May 5, 2019
9	"The Suspicious Treasure Chest"; Transliteration: "Ayashii Takarabako" (Japanese: 怪しい宝箱)	Ayumi Shimo	May 12, 2019
10	"The Invincible Counter"; Transliteration: "Muteki no Kauntā" (Japanese: 無敵のカウンター)	Kaori Kaneko	May 19, 2019
11	"The Quiz King of Flames"; Transliteration: "Honō no Kuizu-ō" (Japanese: 炎のクイズ王)	Junpei Yamaoka	May 26, 2019
12	"The Scorching Illusion"; Transliteration: "Shakunetsu no Gen'ei" (Japanese: 灼熱の幻影)	Junpei Yamaoka	June 2, 2019
13	"The Prime Minister Is from the Ryusoul Tribe!?"; Transliteration: "Sōri-daijin wa Ryūsō-zoku!?" (Japanese: 総理大臣はリュウソウ族!?)	Junpei Yamaoka	June 9, 2019
14	"The Golden Knight"; Transliteration: "Ōgon no Kishi" (Japanese: 黄金の騎士)	Junpei Yamaoka	June 23, 2019
15	"The King of the Deep Sea"; Transliteration: "Shinkai no Ō" (Japanese: 深海の王)	Naruhisa Arakawa	June 30, 2019
16	"The Hope That Sunk into the Sea"; Transliteration: "Umi ni Shizunda Kibō" (Japanese: 海に沈んだ希望)	Naruhisa Arakawa	July 7, 2019
17	"The Captive Warrior"; Transliteration: "Toraware no Mosa" (Japanese: 囚われの猛者)	Ayumi Shimo	July 14, 2019
18	"Big Trouble! Transformation Impossible!"; Transliteration: "Dai Pinchi! Henshin Funō!" (Japanese: 大ピンチ！変身不能！)	Hiroya Taka	July 21, 2019
19	"The Advancing Tyramigo"; Transliteration: "Shingeki no Tiramīgo" (Japanese: 進撃のティラミーゴ)	Junpei Yamaoka	July 28, 2019
20	"The Supreme Artist"; Transliteration: "Shikō no Geijutsuka" (Japanese: 至高の芸術家)	Hiroya Taka	August 4, 2019
21	"The Kishiryu of Light and Darkness"; Transliteration: "Hikari to Yami no Kishiryū" (Japanese: 光と闇の騎士竜)	Junpei Yamaoka	August 11, 2019
22	"The Lives of the Dead!?"; Transliteration: "Shisha no Inochi!?" (Japanese: 死者の生命！？)	Junpei Yamaoka	August 18, 2019
23	"The Legendary Ryusoul"; Transliteration: "Maboroshi no Ryūsōru" (Japanese: 幻のリュウソウル)	Ayumi Shimo	August 25, 2019
24	"The Karate Dojo of Love"; Transliteration: "Koi no Karate Dōjō" (Japanese: 恋の空手道場)	Naruhisa Arakawa	September 1, 2019
25	"A Dancing Kleon"; Transliteration: "Odoru Kureon" (Japanese: 踊るクレオン)	Kaori Kaneko	September 8, 2019
26	"The Seventh Knight"; Transliteration: "Nana-nin-me no Kishi" (Japanese: 7人目の騎士)	Junpei Yamaoka	September 15, 2019
27	"The Unrivaled Fists"; Transliteration: "Tenka Musō no Kobushi" (Japanese: 天下無双の拳)	Junpei Yamaoka	September 22, 2019
28	"A Micro Offense and Defense"; Transliteration: "Mikuro no Kōbō" (Japanese: ミクロの攻防)	Naruhisa Arakawa	September 29, 2019
29	"Canalo's Marriage"; Transliteration: "Kanaro no Kekkon" (Japanese: カナロの結婚)	Hiroya Taka	October 6, 2019
30	"Overthrow! High Spec"; Transliteration: "Datō! Kō Supekku" (Japanese: 打倒！高スペック)	Ayumi Shimo	October 13, 2019
31	"A Melody from the Sky"; Transliteration: "Sora kara no Merodi" (Japanese: 空からのメロディ)	Junpei Yamaoka	October 20, 2019
32	"When the Rain of Hatred Stops Coming Down"; Transliteration: "Zōo no Ame ga Yamu Toki" (Japanese: 憎悪の雨が止む時)	Junpei Yamaoka	October 27, 2019
33	"A New Assassin"; Transliteration: "Aratanaru Shikaku" (Japanese: 新たなる刺客)	Junpei Yamaoka	November 10, 2019
34	"The Evil Space Dragon Appears!"; Transliteration: "Uchū Kyōryū Arawaru!" (Japanese: 宇宙凶竜現る！)	Naruhisa Arakawa	November 17, 2019
35	"The Greatest Battle on Earth"; Transliteration: "Chikyū Saidai no Kessen" (Japanese: 地球最大の決戦)	Naruhisa Arakawa	November 24, 2019
36	"The High-Speed Bodyguard"; Transliteration: "Chōsoku no Bodigādo" (Japanese: 超速のボディガード)	Ayumi Shimo	December 1, 2019
37	"Birth! The Most Fearsome Tag Team"; Transliteration: "Tanjō! Saikyō Taggu" (Japanese: 誕生！最恐タッグ)	Kaori Kaneko	December 8, 2019
38	"The Temple in the Sky"; Transliteration: "Tenkū no Shinden" (Japanese: 天空の神殿)	Hiroya Taka	December 15, 2019
39	"The Stolen Holy Night"; Transliteration: "Ubawareta Seiya" (Japanese: 奪われた聖夜)	Hiroya Taka	December 22, 2019
40	"The Nightmare Within the Fog"; Transliteration: "Kiri no Naka no Akumu" (Japanese: 霧の中の悪夢)	Junpei Yamaoka	January 5, 2020
41	"The Missing Sacred Sword"; Transliteration: "Kieta Seiken" (Japanese: 消えた聖剣)	Junpei Yamaoka	January 12, 2020
42	"The Decisive Battle Stage"; Transliteration: "Kessen no Sutēji" (Japanese: 決戦のステージ)	Ayumi Shimo	January 19, 2020
43	"The Mother of the Druidons"; Transliteration: "Doruidon no Haha" (Japanese: ドルイドンの母)	Junpei Yamaoka	January 26, 2020
44	"The Tested Bond"; Transliteration: "Tamesareta Kizuna" (Japanese: 試されたキズナ)	Junpei Yamaoka	February 2, 2020
45	"Get the Heart Back!"; Transliteration: "Shinzō o Torimodose!" (Japanese: 心臓を取り戻せ！)	Junpei Yamaoka	February 9, 2020
46	"The Noble Kishiryu"; Transliteration: "Kedakaki Kishiryū-tachi" (Japanese: 気高き騎士竜たち)	Junpei Yamaoka	February 16, 2020
47	"Between Happiness and Despair"; Transliteration: "Shiawase to Zetsubō no Hazama de" (Japanese: 幸福と絶望の間で)	Junpei Yamaoka	February 23, 2020
48 (Final)	"Earth's Will"; Transliteration: "Chikyū no Ishi" (Japanese: 地球の意思)	Junpei Yamaoka	March 1, 2020

== Production ==
The trademark for the series was filed by Toei Company on September 20, 2018.

== Films and specials ==
=== Theatrical ===
==== Time Slip! Dinosaur Panic!! ====
Kishiryu Sentai Ryusoulger the Movie: Time Slip! Dinosaur Panic (騎士竜戦隊リュウソウジャー THE MOVIE タイムスリップ！恐竜パニック!!, Kishiryū Sentai Ryūsōjā Za Mūbī Taimu Surippu! Kyōryū Panikku!!) was released in Japan on July 26, 2019, double-billed with Kamen Rider Zi-O the Movie: Over Quartzer. Actors Shirō Sano and Rie Kitahara portrayed the film's main antagonist, Valma, and Yuno respectively. In the film's storyline, the Ryusoulgers end up in the Mesozoic Era where they learn the truth of their ancestors' warlike nature as they are forced to fight them and Gaisoulg to save the future. The events of the movie take place between episodes 14 and 15. This is the first Reiwa era Super Sentai movie, released two months after the 2019 Japanese imperial transition.

==== Ryusoulger VS Lupinranger VS Patranger ====
Kishiryu Sentai Ryusoulger VS Lupinranger VS Patranger the Movie (劇場版 騎士竜戦隊リュウソウジャーVSルパンレンジャーVSパトレンジャー, Gekijōban Kishiryū Sentai Ryūsōjā Bui Esu Rupanrenjā Bui Esu Patorenjā) was released in Japan on February 8, 2020, as part of Super Sentai Movie Party (スーパー戦隊MOVIEパーティー, Sūpā Sentai Mūbī Pātī). The film features a crossover between Ryusoulger and Kaitou Sentai Lupinranger VS Keisatsu Sentai Patranger, and was double billed with the prelude film for Mashin Sentai Kiramager. The events of the movie take place between episodes 40 and 41.

==== Memory of Soulmates ====
Kishiryu Sentai Ryusoulger Special Chapter: Memory of Soulmates (騎士竜戦隊リュウソウジャー 特別編 メモリー・オブ・ソウルメイツ, Kishiryū Sentai Ryūsōjā Tokubetsu-Hen: Memorī obu Sōrumeitsu) was released in Japan on February 20, 2021, as part of Super Sentai Movie Ranger 2021 (スーパー戦隊MOVIEレンジャー2021, Sūpā Sentai Mūbī Renjā Nisen-nijū-ichi) alongside Mashin Sentai Kiramager the Movie: Be-Bop Dream and Kikai Sentai Zenkaiger the Movie: Red Battle! All Sentai Great Assemble!!. The film is set between episodes 32 and 33 of the series, with guest actress Kanon Miyahara portraying a character called Maiko. The film's opening includes a dedication to Ui Tatsui's actress, Mana Kinjo, following her death in December 2020.

=== V-Cinema ===
==== Kiramager vs. Ryusoulger ====
Mashin Sentai Kiramager vs. Ryusoulger (魔進戦隊キラメイジャーVSリュウソウジャー, Mashin Sentai Kirameijā Tai Ryūsōjā) is a V-Cinema release that features a crossover between Ryusoulger and Mashin Sentai Kiramager. The V-Cinema received a limited theatrical release on April 29, 2021, followed by its DVD and Blu-ray release on August 4, 2021.

=== Web series ===
Kishiryu Sentai Ryusoulger: The Legacy of the Master's Soul (騎士竜戦隊リュウソウジャー THE LEGACY OF The Master's Soul, Kishiryū Sentai Ryūsōjā Za Regashī Obu Za Masutāzu Sōru) is a three-episode web-exclusive series released on Toei Tokusatsu Fan Club on October 17, 2021. The special serves as a prequel to the series with Masaya Kikawada, Jouji Shibue and Miyuu Sawai reprising their roles as Masters Red, Blue, and Pink respectively.

== Cast ==
- Koh (コウ, Kō): Hayate Ichinose (一ノ瀬 颯, Ichinose Hayate)
- Melto (メルト, Meruto): Keito Tsuna (綱 啓永, Tsuna Keito)
- Asuna (アスナ): Ichika Osaki (尾碕 真花, Osaki Ichika)
- Towa (トワ): Yuito Obara (小原 唯和, Obara Yuito)
- Bamba (バンバ, Banba): Tatsuya Kishida (岸田 タツヤ, Kishida Tatsuya)
- Canalo (カナロ, Kanaro): Katsumi Hyodo (兵頭 功海, Hyōdō Katsumi)
- Ui Tatsui (龍井 うい, Tatsui Ui): Mana Kinjo (金城 茉奈, Kinjō Mana)
- Naohisa Tatsui (龍井 尚久, Tatsui Naohisa), Seto (セトー, Setō): Mitsuru Fukikoshi (吹越 満, Fukikoshi Mitsuru)
- Master Red (マスターレッド, Masutā Reddo): Masaya Kikawada (黄川田 将也, Kikawada Masaya)
- Master Blue (マスターブルー, Masutā Burū): Jouji Shibue (渋江 譲二, Shibue Jōji)
- Master Pink (マスターピンク, Masutā Pinku): Miyuu Sawai (沢井 美優, Sawai Miyū)
- Elder: Jirō Dan (団 時朗, Dan Jirō)
- Oto (オト): Sora Tamaki (田牧 そら, Tamaki Sora)
- Master Black (マスターブラック, Masutā Burakku): Masaru Nagai (永井 大, Nagai Masaru)
- Nada (ナダ): Seiya Osada (長田 成哉, Osada Seiya)

=== Voice cast ===
- Tyramigo (ティラミーゴ, Tiramīgo): Masaki Terasoma (てらそま まさき, Terasoma Masaki)
- DimeVolcano (ディメボルケーノ, Dimeborukēno): Wataru Takagi (高木 渉, Takagi Wataru)
- MosaRex (モサレックス, Mosarekkusu), Ryusoul Calibur (リュウソウカリバー, Ryūsō Karibā): Ryōta Takeuchi (竹内 良太, Takeuchi Ryōta)
- Chibigaroo (チビガルー, Chibigarū): M·A·O
- Pterardon (プテラードン, Puterādon): Takeshi Kusao (草尾 毅, Kusao Takeshi)
- Gaisoulg (ガイソーグ, Gaisōgu), Ryusoulger Equipment: Tomokazu Seki (関 智一, Seki Tomokazu)
- Tankjoh (タンクジョウ, Tankujō): Jouji Nakata (中田 譲治, Nakata Jōji)
- Wiserue (ワイズルー, Waizurū): Hikaru Midorikawa (緑川 光, Midorikawa Hikaru)
- Gachireus (ガチレウス, Gachireusu): Tetsu Inada (稲田 徹, Inada Tetsu)
- Pricious (プリシャス, Purishasu)/Eras (エラス, Erasu): Romi Park (朴 璐美, Paku Romi)
- Kleon (クレオン, Kureon): Ryoko Shiraishi (白石 涼子, Shiraishi Ryōko)
- Narrator: Kazuya Ichijō (一条 和矢, Ichijō Kazuya)
- Ryusoul Gold Equipment: Jun Hattori (服部 潤, Hattori Jun)

=== Guest cast ===
- Cardena (カルデナ, Karudena; 7–8): Reina Tanaka (田中 れいな, Tanaka Reina)
- Fita (フィータ, Fīta; 7–8): Rei Kobayashi (小林 れい, Kobayashi Rei)
- Ippei Shimomura (下村 一平, Shimomura Ippei; 7–8): Tadashi Mizuno (水野 直, Mizuno Tadashi)
- Office worker (9): Tomonori Mizuno (水野 智則, Mizuno Tomonori)
- Kenta Mori (森健太, Mori Kenta; 10): Oshiro Maeda (前田旺志郎, Maeda Ōshiro)
- Nurse (11): Natsumi Hirajima (平嶋 夏海, Hirajima Natsumi)
- Mioko Karino (狩野 澪子, Karino Mioko; 13): Noriko Nakagoshi (中越 典子, Nakagoshi Noriko)
- Akane Mizuta (水田あかね, Mizuta Akane; 14): Mika Akizuki (秋月三佳, Akizuki Mika)
- Misako Iimura (飯村 美佐子, Iimura Misako; 19): Yukari Taki (滝 裕可里, Taki Yukari)
- Yuiko Tatsui (龍井 結子, Tatsui Yuiko; 21–22) : Megumi Kobashi (小橋 めぐみ, Kobashi Megumi)
- Anikin (アニキン; 25): Hyokkorihan (ひょっこりはん)
- Yui (優衣; 29): Hikaru Yamamoto (山本 ひかる, Yamamoto Hikaru)
- Tomomi Saionji (西園寺 智美, Saionji Tomomi; 30): Nao Nagasawa (長澤 奈央, Nagasawa Nao)
- Saki's coach (36): Takuma Sugawara (菅原 卓磨, Sugawara Takuma)
- Kyōko Taniguchi (谷口 京子, Taniguchi Kyōko; 37): Rei Yoshii (吉井 怜, Yoshii Rei)
- Yuno (ユノ; 38): Rie Kitahara (北原 里英, Kitahara Rie)
- Akari (あかり; 39): Ayaka Komatsu (小松 彩夏, Komatsu Ayaka)
- Miya (ミヤ; 41): Rikako Sakata (坂田 梨香子, Sakata Rikako)

== Songs ==
Opening theme

Song	Lyrics	Composition	Arrangement	Artist	Episodes
"Kishiryu Sentai Ryusoulger" (騎士竜戦隊リュウソウジャー, Kishiryū Sentai Ryūsōjā)	Mike Sugiyama (マイク スギヤマ, Maiku Sugiyama)	Kentaro Sonoda (園田 健太郎, Sonoda Kentarō)	Masato Kouda (甲田 雅人, Kōda Masato)	Tomohiro Hatano (幡野 智宏, Hatano Tomohiro)	All

Ending theme

Song	Lyrics	Composition	Arrangement	Artist	Episodes
"Que Booom! Ryusoulger" (ケボーン！リュウソウジャー, Kebōn! Ryūsōjā)	KOCHO	Kosuke Okui (奥井 康介, Okui Kōsuke)	Takeshi Nakatsuka (中塚 武, Nakatsuka Takeshi)	Sister Mayo	All
