= Kamen Rider Zi-O the Movie: Over Quartzer =

- Kanji: 劇場版 仮面ライダージオウ Over Quartzer
- Revised Hepburn: Gekijōban Kamen Raidā Jiō Ōvā Kwōtsā
- Directed by: Ryuta Tasaki
- Written by: Kento Shimoyama
- Starring: So Okuno; Gaku Oshida; Shieri Ohata; Keisuke Watanabe; Yu Inaba; Chris Peppler; ISSA; YORI; TOMO; KIMI; U-YEAH; KENZO; DAICHI; Tomoya Maeno; Jiei Wakabayashi; Eru Aoba; Syuusuke Saito; Papaya Suzuki; Katsuhisa Namase
- Cinematography: Toshikazu Kamiaka
- Edited by: Ren Satō
- Music by: Toshihiko Sahashi
- Production companies: Toei Company; TV Asahi; Toei Video; Toei Agency; Bandai
- Distributed by: Toei Company
- Release date: July 26, 2019
- Running time: 67 minutes
- Country: Japan
- Language: Japanese
- Box office: $2,765,100

Kamen Rider Zi-O the Movie: Over Quartzer (劇場版 仮面ライダージオウ Over Quartzer, Gekijōban Kamen Raidā Jiō Ōvā Kwōtsā) is a 2019 Japanese superhero film, serving as the film adaptation and alternate ending of the 2018–2019 Japanese Drama Kamen Rider Zi-O. The film also pays tribute to Kamen Rider Drive and introduces the main character of Kamen Rider Zero-One. It was released in Japan on July 26, 2019, in a double billing with Kishiryu Sentai Ryusoulger the Movie: Time Slip! Dinosaur Panic.

The movie's title is a reference to the show's theme song, which also bears the same title.

== Plot ==
Sougo Tokiwa and his friends end up in 16th century Japan during the legendary battle between Oda Nobunaga and Takeda Katsuyori after being approached by Go Shijima and Krim Steinbelt to prevent the latter's ancestor from being killed by a group of time traveling observers known as the "Quartzers", who seek to erase Kamen Rider Drive from history. As Woz reveals himself to be a member of the Quartzers, the truth behind Oma Zi-O is finally revealed.

== Cast ==
- Sougo Tokiwa (常磐 ソウゴ, Tokiwa Sōgo): So Okuno (奥野 壮, Okuno Sō)
- Geiz Myokoin (明光院 ゲイツ, Myōkōin Geitsu): Gaku Oshida (押田 岳, Oshida Gaku)
- Tsukuyomi (ツクヨミ): Shieri Ohata (大幡 しえり, Ōhata Shieri)
- Woz (ウォズ, Wozu): Keisuke Watanabe (渡邊 圭祐, Watanabe Keisuke)
- Go Shijima (詩島 剛, Shijima Gō): Yu Inaba (稲葉 友, Inaba Yū)
- Krim Steinbelt (クリム・スタインベルト, Kurimu Sutainberuto): Chris Peppler (クリス・ペプラー, Kurisu Pepurā)
- SOUGO Tokiwa (常磐 SOUGO(ソウゴ), Tokiwa SŌGO): ISSA (Da Pump)
- Members of the Quartzers: YORI, TOMO, KIMI, U-YEAH, KENZO, and DAICHI (Da Pump)
- Oda Nobunaga (織田 信長): Tomoya Maeno (前野 朋哉, Maeno Tomoya)
- Gyūzō (牛三): Jiei Wakabayashi (若林 時英, Wakabayashi Jiei)
- Clara Steinbelt (クララ・スタインベルト, Kurara Sutainberuto): Eru Aoba (蒼葉 える, Aoba Eru)
- Pietro (ピエトロ, Pietoro): Caleb Bryant
- Sōtarō Tokiwa (常磐 宗太郎, Tokiwa Sōtarō): Keizo Nagashima (永島 敬三, Nagashima Keizō)
- Namie Tokiwa (常磐 奈美恵, Tokiwa Namie): Shoko Imayoshi (今吉 祥子, Imayoshi Shōko)
- Young Sougo: Haru Takagi (高木 波瑠, Takagi Haru)
- Jōgen (ジョウゲン): Syuusuke Saito (斉藤 秀翼, Saitō Shūsuke)
- Kagen (カゲン): Papaya Suzuki (パパイヤ鈴木, Papaiya Suzuki)
- Junichirō Tokiwa (常磐 順一郎, Tokiwa Jun'ichirō): Katsuhisa Namase (生瀬 勝久, Namase Katsuhisa)
- Takeshi Kinashi (木梨 猛, Kinashi Takeshi): Noritake Kinashi (木梨 憲武, Kinashi Noritake)
- Ohma Zi-O (オーマジオウ, Ōma Jiō; Voice): Rikiya Koyama (小山 力也, Koyama Rikiya)
- Announcer (Voice): Sakie Uozumi (魚住 咲恵, Uozumi Sakie)
- Kamen Rider Zero-One (仮面ライダーゼロワン, Kamen Raidā Zero Wan; Voice): Fumiya Takahashi (高橋 文哉, Takahashi Fumiya)
- Ziku-Driver Equipment Voice: Rikiya Koyama, Yohei Onishi (大西 洋平, Ōnishi Yōhei)
- BeyonDriver Equipment Voice: Afro (アフロ, Afuro)
- Zero-One's Equipment Voice: Maynard Plant, Blaise Plant

== Theme song ==
- P.A.R.T.Y. ~Universe Festival~ (P.A.R.T.Y. ～ユニバース・フェスティバル～, Pāti ~Yunibāsu Fesutibaru~)
  - Lyrics: shungo.
  - Composition: Drew Ryan Scott, MASAT
  - Arrangement: MASAT
  - Artist: Da Pump

== Reception ==
Kamen Rider Zi-O the Movie: Over Quartzer grossed $2,765,100 at the box office.
