= Ike Nwala =

American comedian, actor and narrator

- Born: June 5, 1986 (age 40); Manhattan, New York, U.S.
- Education: DigiPen Institute of Technology

Comedy career
- Years active: 2011–present
- Medium: television; film; music
- Genre: Sketch comedy
- Website: Official profile

Ike Nwala (アイクぬわら, Aiku Nuwara, born 5 June 1986) is an American comedian, actor, and narrator based in Tokyo, Japan. Nwala is a member of the comedy group Chō Shinjuku, and is represented by Watanabe Entertainment.

== Early life and career ==
Ike Nwala was born on June 5, 1986 in Manhattan, and was raised in Seattle, Washington. As a child he passionate about computers, and taught himself how to code. When he was 18, he enrolled at the DigiPen Institute of Technology, to learn about information technology and technician relations. While in college working at a Japanese video shop in Chinatown–International District, Seattle, Nwala was shocked by Junji Takada's early morning bazooka corner on the comedy programme Tensai Takeshi no Genki ga Deru TV!!. When he saw the characters Muneo Kurii and Yabao Gesu played by Hironari Yamazaki in Richard Hall, he could not understand the dialogue, but felt it was "comical and funny!" He continued to watch Japanese comedians and their shows, such as Junji Takada, Untouchable, Ogiyahagi, Ninety-nine, Downtown, and Cream Stew. Sparking an interest in Japanese comedy. After graduating early at the age of 20, he worked as a data centre engineer at Goldman Sachs, before leaving and moving to Osaka, Japan to teach himself Japanese and pursue comedy.

While in Japan, Nwala appeared on a popular Japanese TV show, mimicking a Tokyo Disney Sea resort announcer. A video clip of his segment went viral on Twitter, igniting his career in Japanese comedy. He participated in the Chō Shinjuku audition at the recommendation of actor Gota Watabe. Nwala joined Chō Shinjuku on September 29, 2011.

== Personal life ==
He is friends with actor Gota Watabe and singer Nana Tanimura. Nwala is also close to singer Tomohisa Yamashita.

On September 10, 2020, Nwala tested positive for COVID-19.

== Artistic style ==
=== Chō Shinjuku ===
He has many acts revolving around trying to conform to Japanese culture. Sometimes he does impressions of famous figures such as Dante Carver, Usain Bolt, Tiger Woods, etc. He also has a two-man act with Koala Koarashi named Nuwarashi.

=== Nuwarashi ===
As part of Nuwarashi, he brought American elements to the Japanese performance art Nankin Tamasudare. He heavily uses English interjections like "Oh!", "Yeah!", and "Come on!" in his recitations. In addition, the act featured a "Pocochin drum," which consisted of vocal percussion produced upon hitting his crotch, which was exhibited at Tokyo Broadcasting System Television's Arita Children, and came in sixth place in Yahoo's search word and trending topics.

=== Notable activities ===
He performed as a bilingual MC of the popular morning children's program Oha Suta.

Oha Suta corner name	Contents
Sugu ni Tsukaeru! Kakkoe-go!!!	Teaching daily English not taught at school in a hyper way
Nwala Challenge	Trying various things such as backing, break dancing, and lifting weights
Don-Nwala Hakase no Science World	Introduction of magical phenomena using science
Nwalaman!	Corner where the perfect superman Nwalalman attempts to relax and feel free

In 5-Ji ni muchū, he was in charge as the Kurofune correspondent every Wednesday. He played a cheerful character like Eddie Murphy who then impersonates Ryo Fukawa with American-style jokes.

He had a monologue called "Announcement at the entrance of Tokyo Disney Sea", which became a topic on Twitter upon its broadcast on 21st "Komakasugite Tsutawaranai Monomane Senshuken".

He came in 10th place in the 2016 half-year TV program ranking "break out tarento", attracting attention.

After that, the number of his appearances on television have steadily increased, going from 13 in the previous year, to 175 the next, and ranking in the sixth place of the final break-out division of 2016.

== Publications ==
=== Newspapers ===
- The Japan Times (29 Nov 2017) "The consummation of cool is a funny business for comedian Ike Nwala".

=== Magazines ===
- Shūkan Taishū (Shūkan Taishū 16 Oct 2017 issue) "Ike Nwala 'America Hitotoshite Saikyō no Entertainer ni' Warawaseru Ningen Chikara".

== Discography ==
=== Participation work ===
Release date	Artist	Album name	Part no.	Song name	Recorded works
27 Jan 2016	Kishidan	Defective item	AVCD-93336/B	Tsuppari High School Musical (Tōjō-hen)	Introduced Kishidan at intro
21 Sep 2016	team Third Wave	Single	iTunes ID1148459555	Kimi ni Third Wave	Lead vocals of songs

== Films ==
- Yo-kai Watch: Soratobu Kujira to Double no Sekai no Daibōken da Nyan! (2016) guest appearance in live-action part (as himself)
- Yo-kai Watch Shadowside: Oni-ō no Fukkatsu (2017) guest appearance (as eyeglass brother)

== Dramas ==
- Kaitou Sentai Lupinranger VS Keisatsu Sentai Patranger (ABC, 11 Feb 2018 – 10 Feb 2019) – as Director Hilltop

== Appearances ==
=== Television ===
==== Current regular programmes ====
- Oha Suta (TX, 6 Apr 2016 –) (pin) Bilingual MC from weekdays
- 5-Ji ni Muchū! (Tokyo MX, 6 Apr 2016 –) (pin) Every Wednesday

==== Former regular programmes ====
Regular

- Moshi Moshi Nippon TV (NHK G, 31 Jul – 12 Nov 2015, BS Fuji, NHK World) (pin)
- Nep & Imoto no Sekai Banzuke (NTV, 13 Nov 2015 – 11 Mar 2016) (pin)

Quasi-regular

- Eigo de Asobo (NHK E) (pin) Occasional appearances

==== Former appearances ====
Other appearances

HBO

- Vice News Tonight (3 May 2017) (pin)

TV Tokyo

- Konya mo Doru Bako (25 Aug 2015) (Nuwarashi)
- Kore Kangaeta Hito, Tensai ja ne!? –Sekai no Benri Goods Atsumemashita Special– (27 Nov 2015, 11 Jan 2016) (pin)
- Goddotan (20 Aug 2016) (pin)
- Nichiyou Chaplin (5 Nov, 24 Dec 2017) (Chō Shinjuku)

Nippon TV

- 24-Jikan TV "Ai wa Chikyū o Sukuu" (31 Aug 2014/23 Aug 2015) (Chō Shinjuku) 37 Ai wa Chikyū o Sukuu
- Ariyoshi no Kabe (3 Aug/28 Dec 2015) (pin)
- Downtown no Gaki no Tsukai ya Arahende!! (9 Aug 2015) (pin)
- Monomane Grand Prix (22 Sep 2015) (pin)
- Uchi no Gaya ga sumimasen! Archived 2018-07-07 at the Wayback Machine (13 Dec 2015) (pin)
- Geinin Hōdō (28 Dec 2015) (Chō Shinjuku)
- Sukkiri! (5 Jan 2016) (Nuwarashi)
- Kyūkyoku no ￮× Quiz Show!! Chō Toi! Shinjitsu ka? Uso ka? (2 Jun 2017) (Nuwarashi)
- Uwasa no Neta (21 Jun 2017) (pin)
- Intelli ga Shiranai Sekai no o Baka Gimon (26 Aug 2017) (pin)
- School Kakumei! (5 Nov 2017) (pin)

Fuji Television

- Tonneruzu no Minasan no Okage deshita (2 Apr 2015/22 Dec 2012) Hakase to joshu –Komakasugite Tsutawaranai Monomane Senshuken– (pin)
- Sakigake! Ongaku no Jikan (15 Nov 2015/17/24 Jan/6 Mar 2016) (pin)
- Proyagu Chin Play Kō Play Taishō (5 Nov 2016) (pin)
- Nep League (12 Dec 2016/27 Mar/17 Apr 2017) (pin)
- Love music (6/13 Aug 2017) (pin)
- Ninki Geinōjin ni Itazura! Gyōten Happening * Renpatsu (5 Oct 2017) (pin)

Tokyo MX

- Barairo Dandy (16 Sep 2016) (pin)

TV Asahi

- 'Pu' Suma (27 Mar 2015) (Nuwarashi)
- Nihonjin no 3-wari shika Shiranai koto Cream Stew no Hana Taka! Yūetsu-kan (19 Jul/30 Aug/4 Oct 2015) (pin)
- Nanikore Chinhyakkei (9 Dec 2015/14 Dec 2016) (pin)
- Buramayo to yu kaina Nakama-tachi Atsu Atsu'! (27 Feb/5 Mar 2016) (pin)
- Kikinikui Koto o Kiku (8 Jun/24 Aug 2016) (pin)
- Morning Show (7 Jul 2016) (pin)
- Onegai! Ranking (31 Aug/14/28 Sep 2016) (pin)
- Ametalk (10 Aug/14 Sep 2017) (pin)
- Cream VS Osamu Hayashi! Quiz Survivor (31 Dec 2017) (pin)
- Sekai wa tatta 6-ri de tsunagaru (4 Jan 2018) (pin)

Tokyo Broadcasting System Television

- Arita Children (16 Jun 2015) (Nuwarashi)
- Geinin Cannonball (1 Jan 2016) (pin)
- Kyūkyoku Battle "Zeus" III (24 Nov 2016) (pin)
- Suiyōbi no Downtown (21 Jun 2017) (pin)
- Nakai-kun no Manabu Switch (30 Oct 2017) (pin)

BS-CS broadcast

- Gekirea Chinhyakkei (5 Jul/1 Nov, CS TereAsa Channel 1) (pin)
- Gyara 3000-en Geinin (10 Aug 2015, BS Sky PerfecTV!) (pin)
- Nogizaka46 Eigo (10 Dec 2016, CS TBS Channel) (pin)

Sky PerfecTV!

- Dream Series Geinin All Star Champion Bowling 2018 (30 Jan 2018) (pin)

Iwate Asahi Television/Akita Asahi Broadcasting

- Katte ni Kankō Taishi (7 Nov 2015) (pin)

Chubu-Nippon Broadcasting

- Owarai Wide Show Marco Polori! (1 May 2016) (Nuwarashi)
- mu-Jack (21 Apr 2017) (Nuwarashi)

Mainichi Broadcasting System

- Banana BuraMayo no Atarashī Hōritsu o Tsukuru Kai Archived 2017-10-29 at the Wayback Machine (28 Feb 2017) (pin)

Space Shower TV

- Mogi Mogi Kana-Boon (4 Feb 2016, 11/18/25 Jun 2017) (pin)

=== Voice acting ===
==== Current regular programmes ====
- Love music (CX, 16 Oct 2015 –) Narration charge; Every Sunday

==== Former appearances ====
- The Big Chance! (29 Dec 2014/3 Aug 2015) Narration
- Countdown Anime Heroine (29 Dec 2014, NHK Radio) Narration
- Yachimata TV (12 Apr 2017) Narration
- Zettai! Kazlazer (19 Apr 2017) Narration
- Mission "Hawaii-shima no Zaihō o Sagase!" (30 Sep 2017, NHK E) Narration; as Boss
- VS Arashi (12 Oct 2017) Narration; In the corner "Quiz Jun Matsumoto"

==== Tokusatsu ====
- Kaitou Sentai Lupinranger VS. Keisatsu Sentai Patranger (2018 - 2019) Commander Hilltop
- Ultra Galaxy Fight: The Destined Crossroad (2022) voice of Ultraman Nice

=== Radio ===
- Lotti no Dame Dame Radio Tenshi no Okotoba (17 Ayg 2013, NHK Radio) (Nuwarashi)
- Radipedia (14 Apr 2014, J-Wave) (Chō Shinjuku)
- CRK Music H.E.A.D.S. (21 Feb 2015, Radio Kansai) (Chō Shinjuku)
- Alco & Peace no All Night Nippon 0 (27 Aug 2015, NBS) (pin)
- Mana Sakura-Hollywood Koshisho no Asamade Maruhadaka (30 Jul/6 Aug 2016, NCB) (pin)
- Gold Rush (13 Jan 2017, J-Wave) (pin)
- Avalon (23 May 2017, J-Wave) (pin)
- Sanshirō no All Night Nippon 0 (24 Dec 2017, NBS) –Radio Charity Musicthon Special– (pin)

=== Webcasts ===
==== Former appearances ====
- Wata@Ame! (Ameba Fresh! Studio, 28 Sep 2015) (Chō Shinjuku)
- Maasa no Heya e yōkoso (NotTV, 21/28 Nov 2015) (Nuwarashi)
- Dōga Hakkutsu! Gao Gao Gyao! (GyaO, webcast period 9 Nov 2016 – 14 Jan 2017) (Nuwarashi) Part 1/2/3/4
- Sakidori Bose (GyaO, 19 Dec 2016 – 30 Jan 2017) (pin) every Monday
- Daimaou Kosaka no Katsuage (Abema TV, 27 Dec 2016) (pin)
- The Night (AbemaTV, 11/18 Mar 2017) (pin)

([木内晶子] In 1997, she applied to the "1st The Japan Audition" by a classmate's recommendation while studying at Kagawa Prefecture Takamatsu West High School. She passed the actor division from 190,000 people and entered the entertainment industry. The following year, she debuted as a heroine role at TBS series Pu-Pu-Pu- where V6's Coming Century starred.

== Stage ==
=== Personal live ===
- Ike Nwala no Comedy Challenge
  - Vol.1 (4 Jun 2016) Guests: Miracle Hikaru, Saraba Seishun no Hikari's Tetsuya Morita, New York's Hiromasa Yashiki. VTR Navigator: Ogiyahagi's Ken Yahagi
  - Vol.2 (5 Mar 2017) Guests: Jun Miho, Shizzle's Jun Murakami, Zigzag Ziggy's Masaru Ikeda. VTR Navigator: Drunk Dragon's Taku Suzuki

=== Guest appearances ===
- Chidori no Dai Manzai (Surprise Guest appearance on a single live of Chidori)
  - Tokyo Yomiuri Hall (5 Nov 2017)
  - Osaka Shin Kabukiza (10 Nov 2017)

=== Events ===
- 8 May 2016 "Dynamite Kansai 2016 –Open Tournament Zenyasai–" (Lumine the Yoshimoto) (pin)
- 21 Aug 2016 "Rocketman Summer Fes' 2016 thank you for the music!" (Tokyo Ebisu The Garden Hall) (pin)

== Advertising ==
=== Television ===
- DMM Eikaiwa TVCM (2014) Co-starred with Ogiyahagi's Ken Yahagi as a teacher on a YouTube ad (2015)
- Puzzle Wonderland TVCM (2015) (pin)
- DMM Eikaiwa TVCM (2017)

=== Internet ===
- Sanko-Seika (5 Oct 2015) web limited video, new product Nōkō Cheese Kibun as Rich Cheese Man (pin)
- West Gigantic City Land '17 official adverts
  - Waiting Room (26 Jun 2017) (pin)
  - Interview (30 Jun 2017) (pin)
  - Shadow Boxing (7 Jul 2017) (pin)
  - Ticket (20 Jul 2017) (pin)
