= Asahi Ito =

Japanese actor

- 伊藤 あさひ
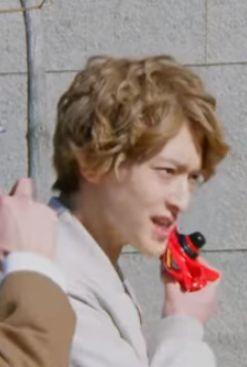
- Asahi Ito in 2018 as he appears in Kaitou Sentai Lupinranger VS Keisatsu Sentai Patoranger
- Born: January 19, 2000 (age 26); Tokyo, Japan
- Education: Keio University
- Occupation: Actor
- Years active: 2017–present
- Agent: Ken-On
- Website: Official website

Asahi Ito (伊藤 あさひ, Itō Asahi; born January 19, 2000) is a Japanese actor who is represented by Ken-On.

== Biography ==
Asahi Ito was born in Tokyo on January 19, 2000. Between the ages of one and three, he lived in Guam, which is also where he shot his first photo book.

Prior to his debut, he was a hair model. In 2017 Ito made his acting debut in Emergency Interrogation Room Season 2.

In 2018 he landed his first leading role as an actor in 2018 Super Sentai series Kaitou Sentai Lupinranger VS Keisatsu Sentai Patranger as Kairi Yano/Lupin Red. Ito was the first actor to play a Red Ranger in the Super Sentai series to be born in the 2000s, and, at 18 years old, was at that point the youngest actor to play a Red Ranger.

On March 2023, Asahi Ito announced on his official Instagram that he graduated from Keio University where he studied at the Department of Political Science.

== Filmography ==
=== TV dramas ===
Year	Title	Role	Notes	Ref.
2017	Emergency Interrogation Room 2	Sho Hasebe	Episode 4	
2017	My High School Business	Shun Takase		
2018	Kaitou Sentai Lupinranger VS Keisatsu Sentai Patranger	Kairi Yano/Lupin Red	Lead role	
2019	Takane to Hana	Nicole Luciano		
2019	Where Have My Skirts Gone?	Ichidou Yasuko		
2019	Beshari Gurashi	Haruma Tamaki	Episode 1	
2019	Marigold in 4 Minutes	Yuko Ueda		
2020	Yell	Wataru Takenaka	Asadora	
2021-2022	A Man Who Defies the World of BL	Kikuchi		
2022	Murai in Love	Kiriyama		
2022	Kiss x Kiss x Kiss: Melting Night		Episodes 1, 7, 15	
2022	Blue Box Briefing	Terawaki	Episode 3	
2023	Saraba, Yoki Hi	Gou Makishima	8 episodes	
2023	Worst to First: A Teen Baseball Miracle	Marin Tsubakiya	10 episodes	
2024	A Man Who Defies the World of BL 2024	Kikuchi		
2024	Sibling Intrusion	Kenta Naruse	10 episodes	
2025	When It Rains, It Pours	Sei Nakarai	Lead role	
2025	Jouseiyou Fuuzoku	Haruki	Lead role, Vertical short drama	

=== Films ===
Year	Title	Role	Notes	Ref.
2018	Kaitou Sentai Lupinranger VS Keisatsu Sentai Patranger en Film	Kairi Yano/Lupin Red	Lead role	
2019	Lupinranger VS Patranger VS Kyuranger	Kairi Yano/Lupin Red		
2020	Kishiryu Sentai Ryusoulger VS Lupinranger VS Patranger the Movie	Kairi Yano/Lupin Red		
2020	Kiss Him, Not Me	Nozomu Nanashima, Shion		
2025	Under the Big Onion	Koshiba		
2026	The Honest Realtor: The Movie			
