= Koji Kominami =

Japanese model and actor

- 小南 光司
- Born: December 12, 1994 (age 31); Kanagawa Prefecture, Japan
- Occupations: Model; actor
- Years active: 2015–present
- Agent: Trustar
- Height: 181 cm (5 ft 11 in)
- Website: ameblo.jp/kominamikoji

Koji Kominami (小南 光司, Kominami Kōji; born December 12, 1994) is a Japanese model and actor. From 2015 to 2017, he was an exclusive model for the fashion magazines Samurai Elo and Popteen.

== Career ==
=== Modeling career ===
Kominami was a model for the hair salon Ocean Tokyo and was later scouted to model professionally. From 2015 to 2017, Kominami was an exclusive model for the fashion magazines Samurai Elo and Popteen. During his time at Popteen, he was referred to the nickname "Konan", and, in 2016, he was awarded 2nd place in Popteen's 2nd Handsome General Election. He modeled at the Kansai Collection 2016 Spring & Summer show, the Kansai Collection 2017 Spring & Summer show, and the Cho Jidai: Ultra Teens Fes 2017 show.

== Filmography ==
=== Television ===
Year	Title	Role	Network	Notes
2016	Last Kiss: Saigo ni Kiss Suru Date	Himself	TBS	Reality show; partnered with Mariya Nagao
2018	Dikita Malimot: Ōsen no Wakasha-tachi	Eleni	TVK	
2020	Mashin Sentai Kiramager	Yūjin Kusaka	TV Asahi	Episode 32
2021	A Man Who Defies the World of BL	Uchiumi	CS TV Asahi Channel 1	

=== Theatre ===
Year	Title	Role	Notes
2016	Ensemble Stars! On Stage	Rei Sakuma	
2016	Whistle! Breakthrough: Kabe wo Tsuki Yabure!	Shuji Nakanishi	
2017	Ensemble Stars! On Stage: Take Your Marks	Rei Sakuma	
2017	King of Prism: Over the Sunshine	Koji Mihama	
2018	Ensemble Stars! On Stage: To the Shining Future	Rei Sakuma	
2019	Gyakuten Saiban: Gyakuten no Gold Medal	Yorkshire Belgian	
2019	Bungo to Alchemist: Yokeisha no Banka	Haruo Sato	
2019	Oretachi Maji-kō Destroy	Myu Suzuki	
2019	Yorha Ver. 1.03A	No. 21	
2019	Ensemble Stars! On Stage: Destruction × Road	Rei Sakuma	
2019	Persona 5: The Stage	Yusuke Kitagawa	
2020	Fire Force	Rekka Hoshimiya	
2020	Haruka: Beyond the Stream of Time 3	TBA	
2021	Paradox Live on Stage	Hajun Yeon	

=== Music video ===
Year	Artist	Song	Notes
2017	Miyu Inoue	"Shake Up"	

=== Film ===
Year	Title	Role	Notes
2016	4-gatsu no Kimi, Spica	Mizuki Otaka	Direct-to-DVD short drama distributed in the October 2016 issue of Sho-Comi
2017	O-Edo no Candy 2	Yoshikichi	
2017	Kizudarake no Akuma	Atsushi Toma	
2017	Kōkō Guren-tai	Haruki Ehara	
2018	Namae no Nai Onna-tachi: Usotsuki Onna	Tsubasa	
2019	Itsumo Wasurenai yo	Eleni	

== Publications ==
=== Photobooks ===
Year	Title	Publisher	ISBN
2018	1K	Internet Frontier	ISBN 978-4862059185
