= Kaitou Sentai Lupinranger VS Keisatsu Sentai Patranger =

Japanese drama

- Genre: Tokusatsu; Superhero fiction; Action; Science fiction; Crime fiction; Neo-western; Neo-noir; Police drama; Comedy
- Created by: Toei Company
- Written by: Junko Kōmura; Naruhisa Arakawa; Akatsuki Yamatoya; Kaori Kaneko
- Directed by: Teruaki Sugihara; Hiroyuki Kato; Shojiro Nakazawa; Katsuya Watanabe; Koichiro Hayama
- Starring: Asahi Ito; Shogo Hama; Haruka Kudō; Kousei Yuki; Ryo Yokoyama; Kazusa Okuyama; Seiya Motoki; Jingi Irie; Ike Nwala; Yoichi Nukumizu
- Voices of: Yūji Mitsuya; Rie Kugimiya; Mitsuru Miyamoto; Yūji Ueda; Ayana Taketatsu
- Narrated by: Hiroki Yasumoto
- Opening theme: "Lupinranger VS Patranger"; Performed by Project.R (Tatsuhiko Yoshida, Hitomi Yoshida)
- Composer: Hiroshi Takaki
- Country of origin: Japan
- Original language: Japanese
- No. of episodes: 51 (list of episodes)

Production
- Executive producer: Motoi Sasaki (TV Asahi)
- Producers: Chihiro Inoue (TV Asahi); Ayumi Kanno (TV Asahi); Takaaki Utsunomiya (Toei); Kōichi Yada (Toei Agency); Akihiro Fukada (Toei Agency)
- Production location: Tokyo, Japan (Greater Tokyo Area)
- Running time: 24–25 minutes
- Production companies: TV Asahi; Toei Company; Toei Agency

Original release
- Network: ANN (TV Asahi)
- Release: February 11, 2018 – February 10, 2019

Related
- Uchu Sentai Kyuranger; Super Sentai Strongest Battle; Kishiryu Sentai Ryusoulger

Kaitou Sentai Lupinranger VS Keisatsu Sentai Patranger (快盗戦隊ルパンレンジャーVS警察戦隊パトレンジャー, Kaitō Sentai Rupanrenjā Bui Esu Keisatsu Sentai Patorenjā; Phantom Thief Squadron Lupinranger VS Police Squadron Patranger), commonly shortened as LuPat (ルパパト, Rupapato), is a Japanese tokusatsu drama and the 42nd entry of the Toei Company's long-running Super Sentai metaseries. With the exception of their traditional Super Sentai team-up movies, this is the only series to feature two different teams of heroes - the gentleman thief-themed Lupinrangers and the police officer-themed Patrangers, who engage in a three-way battle against an alien criminal organization targeting Earth called the Ganglars. It is also the first Super Sentai TV series to not have an ending theme like many of TV Asahi's other shows. Lupinranger VS Patranger, which was the last Super Sentai series to air entirely in the Heisei era, aired from February 11, 2018 to February 10, 2019, replacing Uchu Sentai Kyuranger, and being temporarily replaced by Super Sentai Strongest Battle. After 4 weeks, it was completely replaced by Kishiryu Sentai Ryusoulger on March 17. The program joining Kamen Rider Build and later, Kamen Rider Zi-O, in the Super Hero Time line-up on TV Asahi affiliate stations.

Additionally, Lupinranger VS Patranger began airing in South Korea in June 2020 as Power Rangers Lupin Force VS Patrol Force.

Two of the series villain costumes and a prop were used for the 30th season of the American Power Rangers series (Power Rangers Cosmic Fury).

== Story ==
The Lupin Collection, a vast ensemble of dangerous items acquired by the legendary gentleman thief Arsène Lupin, is stolen by an interdimensional crime syndicate known as the Ganglars. However, they receive opposition from two Super Sentai teams: the Lupinrangers: Kairi Yano, Tooma Yoimachi and Umika Hayami, who aim to steal back the collection to live up their namesake's reputation and save those they have lost, and the Patrangers: Keiichiro Asaka, Sakuya Hikawa and Tsukasa Myoujin, who are tasked with upholding justice by retrieving the collection and taking down the Gangler. A human drama unfolds that pits the opposing teams against each other as their tale is woven, which is made more intricate by the Lupin Collection's mysterious origins and its contributor Noël Takao, who aids the two teams as their fourth member in the hopes of uniting them against the Gangler for his own agenda. After the Gangler are eventually defeated, the Patrangers learn the Lupinrangers' civilian identities and motives while Noël still works to unite the two Super Sentai teams into one.

== Characters ==
=== VS Sentai ===
VS Sentai (VS戦隊, Bui Esu Sentai) is a title used by teams who transform by utilizing varying VS Vehicles (VSビークル, Bui Esu Bīkuru) in conjunction with VS Changer (VSチェンジャー, Bui Esu Chenjā) firearms.

==== Lupinrangers ====
The eponymous Lupinrangers are a trio of phantom thieves who are recruited by Arsène Lupin's retainer Kogure to retrieve the Lupin Collection (ルパンコレクション, Rupan Korekushon) items in order to save their loved ones, who were taken by the Ganglar member Zamigo Delma a year prior. The group is based at the Bistrot Jurer (ビストロ・ジュレ, Bisutoro Jure) cafe as part-time workers where they learn the Patrangers' identities while concealing their own until the events of the final battle.

The Lupinrangers transform by utilizing Dial Fighters (ダイヤルファイター, Daiyaru Faitā) in conjunction with VS Changers. While transformed, they each carry a Lupin Sword (ルパンソード, Rupan Sōdo) sidearm, which can switch between Sword Mode (ソードモード, Sōdo Mōdo) and Magic Hand Mode (マジックハンドモード, Majikku Hando Mōdo). They can also use Good Striker to create two copies of a member and perform the Seizing Strike (イタダキストライク, Itadaki Sutoraiku) finisher. When facing enlarged Ganglars, they combine their personal Dial Fighters and Good Striker to form their giant robot, Lupin Kaiser (ルパンカイザー, Rupan Kaizā), via Kaitou Combination (快盗合体, Kaitō Gattai).

Utilizing the Victory Striker (ビクトリーストライカー, Bikutorī Sutoraikā), any one of the Lupinrangers can either become a Super Lupinranger (スーパールパンレンジャー, Sūpā Rupanrenjā) or transform Patren X into Super Patren X (スーパーパトレンX, Sūpā Patoren Ekkusu) where they gain the use of foresight.

Kairi Yano (夜野 魁利, Yano Kairi)
A 19-year-old impulsive youth who utilizes the Red Dial Fighter (レッドダイヤルファイター, Reddo Daiyaru Faitā), which forms the head and chest of Lupin Kaiser, to transform into Lupin Red (ルパンレッド, Rupan Reddo). He takes his role as a Lupinranger seriously despite lazing around while working at the Bistrot Jurer and his antics with Keiichiro. Behind this façade, Kairi is a traumatized individual who lost his parents as a child, which leads to him becoming jealous of Keiichiro. After the apparent death of his older brother Shori Yano (夜野 勝利, Yano Shōri), Kairi seeks vengeance against Zamigo and will go berserk at the sight of him. Later in the series, he acquires the Lupin Magnum (ルパン・マグナム, Rupan Magunamu) handgun, which can either combine with a VS Changer to perform the Seizing Do Do Do Strike (いただき度度度ストライク, Itadaki Do Do Do Sutoraiku) finisher or be enlarged and assume a humanoid Robo Mode (ロボモード, Robo Mōdo) capable of combining with his teammates' personal Dial Fighters to form Lupin Magnum Superior (ルパン・マグナム・スーペリア, Rupan Magunamu Sūperia).

Tooma Yoimachi (宵町 透真, Yoimachi Tōma)
A 24-year-old composed gentleman who utilizes the Blue Dial Fighter (ブルーダイヤルファイター, Burū Daiyaru Faitā), which forms the right arm of Lupin Kaiser, to transform into Lupin Blue (ルパンブルー, Rupan Burū), having joined the group after the apparent death of his fiancé Aya Ohira (大平 彩, Ōhira Aya). As the oldest and most experienced member due to having worked at the Ciel Bleu (シエル・ブル, Shieru Buru) restaurant, he is normally the group's voice of reason, though he is prone to occasional lapses in judgement.

Umika Hayami (早見 初美花, Hayami Umika)
An 18/19-year-old carefree girl who utilizes the Yellow Dial Fighter (イエローダイヤルファイター, Ierō Daiyaru Faitā), which forms the left arm of Lupin Kaiser, to transform into Lupin Yellow (ルパンイエロー, Rupan Ierō), having joined the group after the apparent death of her best friend Shiho Ichinose (一ノ瀬 詩穂, Ichinose Shiho), who pushed her out of the way of Zamigo's blast, which lead to Umika dropping out of Kohakugaoka Girls' High School (琥珀ヶ丘女子高校, Kohakugaoka Joshi Kōkō). Working as a waitress at Bistrot Jurer, she is the most friendly towards the Patrangers as she has fought alongside Tsukasa while maintaining her cover.

==== Patrangers ====
The eponymous Patrangers are a trio of police officers from the Global Special Police Organization (国際特別警察機構, Kokusai Tokubetsu Keisatsu Kikō; GSPO), an international police force based in France that was established to deal with the Ganglar menace. The group are based at the GSPO's Japan Branch, which is in the same neighborhood as the Bistrot Jurer.

The Patrangers transform by utilizing Trigger Machines (トリガーマシン, Torigā Mashin) in conjunction with VS Changers. While transformed, they each carry a Pat MegaBo (パトメガボー, Pato Megabō) sidearm, which can switch between Megaphone Mode (メガホンモード, Megahon Mōdo) and Baton Mode (警棒モード, Keibō Mōdo). They can also use Good Striker to fuse into the tricolored Patren Ugou (パトレンU号, Patoren Yū-gō) and perform the One-Shot Strike (イチゲキストライク, Ichigeki Sutoraiku) finisher. When facing enlarged Ganglars, they combine their personal Trigger Machines and Good Striker to form their giant robot, Pat Kaiser (パトカイザー, Pato Kaizā), via Keisatsu Combination (警察合体, Keisatsu Gattai).

Utilizing the Siren Striker (サイレンストライカー, Sairen Sutoraikā), any one of the Patrangers can either become a Super Patranger (スーパーパトレンジャー, Sūpā Patorenjā) or transform Lupin X into Super Lupin X (スーパールパンX, Sūpā Rupan Ekkusu) where they are equipped with a pair of shoulder-mounted cannons.

Keiichiro Asaka (朝加 圭一郎, Asaka Keiichirō)
A hot-blooded, serious police officer and leader of the Patrangers who utilizes Trigger Machine 1gou (トリガーマシン1号, Torigā Mashin Ichigō), which forms the head and chest of Pat Kaiser, to transform into the red-colored Patren 1gou (パトレン1号, Patoren Ichigō). He puts his duties as a police officer first in pursuing Ganglar members and protecting civilians. While he has a positive view on how the Lupin Collection could be used for good, he initially expressed disdain towards the Lupinrangers before learning of Lupin Red's motives and realizing the group is more than they appeared. As Keiichiro grew up with a kind and loving family, he did not know suffering until he met Kairi. After learning of his past and how his brother became one of Zamigo's victims, Keiichiro understands what it means to suffer.

Sakuya Hikawa (陽川 咲也, Hikawa Sakuya)
An optimistic junior to Keiichiro and Tsukasa who utilizes Trigger Machine 2gou (トリガーマシン2号, Torigā Mashin Nigō), which forms the left arm of Pat Kaiser, to transform into the green-colored Patren 2gou (パトレン2号, Patoren Nigō). He was brought in to replace Satoru Shinonome (東雲悟, Shinonome Satoru), and serves as the team's sharpshooter and police car driver. Sakuya is observant and quick-thinking, though he considers doing his job and protecting civilians as more important than the GSPO's reputation. Unlike Keiichiro, he has a positive view of the Lupinrangers. Sakuya later fell in love with Umika, and denies that she is a Lupinranger until he learned of their identities and learned of Umika's reasoning for becoming a Lupinranger.

Tsukasa Myoujin (明神 つかさ, Myōjin Tsukasa)
A candid, caring policewoman and Keiichiro's classmate from police school who aspired to become an officer like her grandfather and utilizes Trigger Machine 3gou (トリガーマシン3号, Torigā Mashin Sangō), which forms the right arm of Pat Kaiser, to transform the pink-colored Patren 3gou (パトレン3号, Patoren Sangō). As the most calm and collected member of the Patrangers, she is often forced to temper her teammates' personalities. Unlike Keiichiro and Sakuya, she is indifferent towards the Lupinrangers, as she is more focused on their origins and equipment. Despite her serious demeanor, she secretly has an obsession for plush toys and a fondness for adorable children. After learning the Lupinrangers' identities, she developed a desire to help them rather than arrest them.

==== Noël Takao ====
Noël Takao (高尾 ノエル, Takao Noeru) is a mysterious 26-year-old gentleman thief who operates as a special investigator from the GSPO's French branch. He was also the adopted son of Arsène Lupin, one of Back World's original inhabitants alongside Kogure, and the creator of the VS Changers and VS Vehicles along with other items in the Lupin Collection. Noël arrived in Japan to aid the Lupinrangers and Patrangers, intending to unite the two teams against the Ganglars.

Unlike the Lupinrangers and Patrangers, Noël utilizes the X Changer (Xチェンジャー, Ekkusu Chenjā) firearm, which is composed of two X Trains (エックストレイン, Ekkusu Torein), to transform into one of two X (エックス, Ekkusu) forms based on the aforementioned teams. While transformed, he wields the X Rod Sword (Xロッドソード, Ekusu Roddo Sōdo) sidearm, which has a Sword Mode for performing the Superior X (スペリオルエックス, Superioru Ekkusu) finisher and a Rod Mode (ロッドモード, Roddo Mōdo) for performing the Excellent X (エクセレントエックス, Ekuserento Ekkusu) finisher. When facing enlarged Ganglars, he combines the X Changer, X Train Fire (エックストレインファイヤー, Ekkusu Torein Faiyā), and X Train Thunder (エックストレインサンダー, Ekkusu Torein Sandā) to form his giant robot X Emperor (エックスエンペラー, Ekkusu Enperā), which can switch between two sub-forms, via X Combination (エックス合体, Ekkusu Gattai).

- Lupin X (ルパンX, Rupan Ekkusu): Noël's silver-colored Lupinranger form accessed from the X Changer's X Train Silver (エックストレインシルバー, Ekkusu Torein Shirubā) half that grants superhuman durability. In this form, he primarily wields the X Rod Sword in Sword Mode. He also pilots the close combat-oriented X Emperor Slash (エックスエンペラースラッシュ, Ekkusu Enperā Surasshu).
- Patren X (パトレンX, Patoren Ekkusu): Noël's gold-colored Patranger form accessed from the X Changer's X Train Gold (エックストレインゴールド, Ekkusu Torein Gōrudo) half that grants superhuman agility. In this form, he primarily wields the X Rod Sword in Jitte Mode. He also pilots the long range combat-oriented X Emperor Gunner (エックスエンペラーガンナー, Ekkusu Enperā Gannā).

=== Allies ===
Good Striker (グッドストライカー, Guddo Sutoraikā)
Nicknamed "Goodie" (グッティ, Gutti) by Umika, Good Striker is a sentient puppet from the Lupin Collection who supports the Lupinrangers or the Patrangers depending on his mood as he is compatible with both teams' VS Changers. He can also transform into a large-sized VS Vehicle with Dial Fighter and Trigger Machine modes, forms the main body of either team's giant robots, and can combine with the Lupinrangers' personal Dial Fighters, the Patrangers' personal Trigger Machines, and Noël's X Trains to form Good Cool Kaiser VSX (グッドクルカイザーVSX, Guddo Kuru Kaizā Bui Esu Ekkusu).

Kogure (コグレ)
A former Back World resident and butler who worked for Arsène Lupin and assists the Lupinrangers, placing the retrieved Lupin Collection items into a book he carries on his person. While he is primarily focused on regaining the Lupin Collection, Kogure gradually expresses concern for the Lupinrangers while attempting to not become emotionally attached to them. Despite this, he is protective of fellow Back World resident, Noël. After the Patrangers defeated Dogranio, Kogure took the Lupinrangers' loved ones under his wing so they can free them from Dogranio's safe.

Jackpot Striker (ジャックポットストライカー, Jakkupotto Sutoraikā)
Nicknamed "Jack" (ジャック, Jakku) by Kairi, Jackpot Striker is also a sentient puppet from the Lupin Collection who first appeared in Kaitou Sentai Lupinranger VS Keisatsu Sentai Patranger en Film to help Kairi and Keiichiro escape after they were trapped in Back World. He later returns in the final episode to help free the Lupinrangers from Dogranio's safe. Similarly to the Patrangers, the Lupinrangers can use Jackpot Striker to fuse into Lupin Tricolor (ルパントリコロール, Rupan Torikorōru) and perform the One-Shot Strike. Like his acquaintance Good Striker, Jackpot Striker can transform into a large-sized VS Vehicle and combine with the Lupinrangers' personal Dial Fighters to form Lupin Rex (ルパンレックス, Rupan Rekkusu).

Director Samuel Hilltop (サミュエル・ヒルトップ管理官, Samyueru Hirutoppu-kanrikan)
The head of GSPO's Japan Branch and the Patrangers' direct superior. Hilltop is an easy-going man with a penchant for wagashi who is understanding of his subordinates more than they realize and often watches out for them.

Jim Carter (ジム・カーター, Jimu Kātā)
The Patrangers' robotic assistant.

=== Ganglar ===
The Interdimensional Crime Group Ganglar (異世界犯罪者集団ギャングラー, Isekai Hanzaisha Shūdan Gyangurā) is a criminal organization composed of prehistoric or extinct animal-themed monsters that was established five centuries ago and reside in Arsène Lupin's mansion, located in a dimension called Back World (裏の世界, Ura no Sekai). When the Ganglars' founding leader, Dogranio Yarbun, decides to retire, he offers to select his heir from whoever among the Ganglar membership can take over Earth.

Dogranio Yarbun (ドグラニオ・ヤーブン, Doguranio Yābun)
The Ganglars' Tyrannosaurus-themed Status Gold Physical Protect (ステイタス・ゴールド・フィジカル・プロテクト, Suteitasu Gōrudo Fijikaru Purotekuto) founding member and crime lord who led the organization for five centuries armed with the Gangladius (ギャングラディウス, Gyanguradiusu) sword cane. Despite being 999 years old, he is incredibly powerful due to his chest-mounted golden safe, which can hold the entirety of the Lupin Collection and is protected by unbreakable Physical Protect Chains (フィジカル・プロテクト・チェーン, Fijikaru Purotekuto Chēn), which he can manipulate for offensive and defensive purposes. After personally killing Arsène Lupin, Dogranio decides to retire and sets up a contest among his subordinates to select the heir to his criminal empire. Following Destra's death, Dogranio confronts the Lupinrangers and Patrangers himself, only to lose all of his Lupin Collection items he held and imprisoned within the GSPO's underground prison, bound with his own chains. In the stage play Kaitou Sentai Lupinranger VS Keisatsu Sentai Patranger: Final Live Tour 2019, which takes place after the final episode, Dogranio escapes with the help of Kazemi and the revived Destra and Gauche, but is destroyed by the Lupinrangers, Patrangers, and Ryusoulgers.

Destra Maggio (デストラ・マッジョ, Desutora Majjo)
Dogranio's Dilophosaurus-themed right-hand man and bodyguard armed with a war hammer equipped with the built-in Destlauncher (デストランチャー, Desutoranchā) missile pod as well as the ability to summon Golams from his grenades. Destra's shoulder-mounted golden safes originally held two Lupin Collection items: the "Au loin" (遠く離れて, Tōku Hanarete; Far off) slingshot, which increases his firing range, and the "Le coup de chance" (幸運の大当たり, Kōun no Ōatari; The stroke of luck) device, which adds a homing effect to his missiles. However, Destra gave them to Ganglar members Togeno Aves and Anidara Maximoff for their use. He eventually decides to confront the VS Sentai teams and steals the Siren and Victory Strikers, gaining gyrokinesis and the use of foresight respectively, to do so. After the stolen VS Vehicles were retrieved, Destra had Gauche enlarge him, only to be destroyed by the VS Sentai teams. In the stage show Kaitou Sentai Lupinranger VS Keisatsu Sentai Patranger: Final Live Tour 2019, Destra is revived by Kazemi, but is destroyed by the Lupinrangers, Patrangers, and Ryusoulgers.

Gauche Le Mede (ゴーシュ・ル・メドゥ, Gōshu Ru Medu)
A tactless and corrupt Oviraptor-themed scientist with Submachine Wan (サブマシン腕, Sabumashin Wan) cybernetic arms who supports Ganglar members as a doctor to suit her personal agenda. Her built-in back safe contains four items from the Lupin Collection: The "Gros caliber" (大きくなれ, Ōkiku Nare; Get Big) syringe to enlarge Ganglar members, the "Guéris le monde" (世界を癒そう, Sekai o Iyasō; Heal the world) binoculars to analyze whoever she observes, the "Coupe le gâteau" (ケーキ入刀, Kēki Nyūtō; Cut the cake) scalpel which turns her right hand into a sharp blade, and the "Évade-toi de l'autre côté" (突き抜けろ, Tsukinukero; Escape to the other side) crest that allowed her to liquefy herself to withstand attacks. After being betrayed by Dogranio, both the Lupinrangers and the Patrangers attacked her, though she was left severely weakened. In a final attempt to kill the teams, she ripped her safe off and attached it to her final experiment, the black Experimental Body, before dying from her wounds. In the stage show Kaitou Sentai Lupinranger VS Keisatsu Sentai Patranger: Final Live Tour 2019, Gauche is revived by Kazemi, but is destroyed by the Lupinrangers, Patrangers, and Ryusoulgers.

Zamigo Delma (ザミーゴ・デルマ, Zamīgo Deruma)
A mysterious sea angel-themed marksman and bipolar sociopath who acts on his own whims, is capable of regenerating his body from injuries, and using his Freeze Colder (フリーズコールダー, Furīzu Kōrudā) flintlock pistols to transport his victims to another dimension to be used as sacrificial templates for Ganglar disguises. Zamigo played a role in the Lupinrangers' formation as they assumed he killed their loved ones during his rampage during Dogranio's 998th birthday, forming a rivalry with Kairi. He later let Gauche implant a third safe on his tail and gains access to her "Évade-toi de l'autre côté" (突き抜けろ, Tsukinukero; Escape to the other side), which allows him to liquefy his body to withstand attacks. After learning that Kairi is the younger brother of one of his victims, Zamigo exploited this to set up a final duel that ended with his death and his victims returned to where he abducted them from. In the stage show Kaitou Sentai Lupinranger VS Keisatsu Sentai Patranger: Final Live Tour 2019, Zamigo is revived by Kazemi, but is destroyed by Lupin Red.

Pordaman (ポーダマン, Pōdaman)
The Ganglar's street thug-themed foot soldiers who wield daggers and handguns.

Modified Pordaman (改造ポーダマン, Kaizō Pōdaman)
The Modified Pordaman are formerly regular Pordaman that Gauche gave safes to so they can use Lupin Collection items. One such foot soldier wielded the camera-like "La mémoire" (想い出, Omoide; Memory), which enables the user to remove their victim's memory and convert it into a photograph based on it, before he was destroyed by Patren 1gou. Another Modified Pordaman wielded the fossilized head-like "Prends-le dessus" (楽しくいこうぜ, Tanoshiku Ikō ze; Take it on), though the foot soldier was destroyed by Lupin Kaiser Splash Magic before he could use it. A red Modified Pordaman wielded the "Attrapé dans le jeu" (いっしょに遊ぼう, Issho ni Asobō; Caught in the game), which enables the user to force its opponents to be part of its magical game, before he was destroyed by Super Lupin X.

Golams (ゴーラム, Gōramu)
A group of mindless giant alligator snapping turtle-themed foot soldiers with the turtle head-shaped Kamekudaku (カメクダーク, Kamekudāku) for hands. They are often summoned by Destra to fight the VS Vehicles.

==== Ganglar Monsters ====
The Ganglar Monsters (ギャングラー怪人, Gyangurā Kaijin) are the monsters that make up the Ganglar's ranks who divided the stolen Lupin Collection amongst themselves. Each member places a stolen item inside an impenetrable built-in safe on their body to access its power for their use, though the safe can be forced open by someone possessing a Dial Fighter or a special electronic device used by Lupin X. While most members have one safe, Noël designates those with two as Status Double (ステイタス・ダブル, Suteitasu Daburu) and higher-ranked members with golden safes that can only be opened with two Dial Fighters are designated Status Gold (ステイタス・ゴールド, Suteitasu Gōrudo). To blend into human society, some of the Ganglar Monsters wear human disguises purchased from Zamigo. Gauche can also enlarge Ganglar monsters with the "Gros caliber".

== Episodes ==
No.	English title Original Japanese title	Written by	Original release date
1	"The Troublemaking Phantom Thieves"; Transliteration: "Seken o Sawagasu Kaitō sa" (Japanese: 世間を騒がす快盗さ)	Junko Kōmura	February 11, 2018
2	"Global Police, Chase After Them"; Transliteration: "Kokusai Keisatsu, Tsuiseki seyo" (Japanese: 国際警察、追跡せよ)	Junko Kōmura	February 18, 2018
3	"We Will Take Them Back No Matter What"; Transliteration: "Zettai ni Torimodosu" (Japanese: 絶対に取り戻す)	Junko Kōmura	February 25, 2018
4	"An Unacceptable Relationship"; Transliteration: "Yurusarenai Kankei" (Japanese: 許されない関係)	Junko Kōmura	March 4, 2018
5	"The Targeted Global Police"; Transliteration: "Nerawareta Kokusai Keisatsu" (Japanese: 狙われた国際警察)	Junko Kōmura	March 11, 2018
6	"What to Protect"; Transliteration: "Mamoru Beki Mono wa" (Japanese: 守るべきものは)	Junko Kōmura	March 18, 2018
7	"Always Being Saved"; Transliteration: "Itsumo Tasukerarete" (Japanese: いつも助けられて)	Junko Kōmura	March 25, 2018
8	"The Phantom Thieves' Identities"; Transliteration: "Kaitō no Shōtai" (Japanese: 快盗の正体)	Kaori Kaneko	April 1, 2018
9	"To See Them Again"; Transliteration: "Mō Ichido Au Tame ni" (Japanese: もう一度会うために)	Junko Kōmura	April 8, 2018
10	"It Is Not Over Yet"; Transliteration: "Mada Owattenai" (Japanese: まだ終わってない)	Junko Kōmura	April 15, 2018
11	"The Filming Must Go On"; Transliteration: "Satsuei wa Tsuzuku yo Doko made mo" (Japanese: 撮影は続くよどこまでも)	Kaori Kaneko	April 22, 2018
12	"The Magic Bracelet"; Transliteration: "Mahō no Udewa" (Japanese: 魔法の腕輪)	Naruhisa Arakawa	April 29, 2018
13	"The Best and Worst Day Off"; Transliteration: "Saikō de Saitei na Kyūjitsu" (Japanese: 最高で最低な休日)	Naruhisa Arakawa	May 6, 2018
14	"The Set Trap"; Transliteration: "Harimegurasareta Wana" (Japanese: はりめぐらされた罠)	Junko Kōmura	May 13, 2018
15	"A Police Officer's Duty"; Transliteration: "Keisatsukan no Shigoto" (Japanese: 警察官の仕事)	Junko Kōmura	May 20, 2018
16	"Because We Are Comrades"; Transliteration: "Nakama dakara koso" (Japanese: 仲間だからこそ)	Naruhisa Arakawa	May 27, 2018
17	"Secret Feelings"; Transliteration: "Himeta Omoi" (Japanese: 秘めた想い)	Naruhisa Arakawa	June 3, 2018
18	"The Secret of the Collection"; Transliteration: "Korekushon no Himitsu" (Japanese: コレクションの秘密)	Kaori Kaneko	June 10, 2018
19	"Compensation for Disobeying Orders"; Transliteration: "Meirei Ihan no Daishō" (Japanese: 命令違反の代償)	Naruhisa Arakawa	June 17, 2018
20	"The New Phantom Thief Is a Police Officer"; Transliteration: "Aratana Kaitō wa Keisatsukan" (Japanese: 新たな快盗は警察官)	Junko Kōmura	June 24, 2018
21	"Friend or Foe? On Board or Not?"; Transliteration: "Teki ka Mikata ka, Noru ka Noranai ka" (Japanese: 敵か味方か、乗るか乗らないか)	Junko Kōmura	July 1, 2018
22	"Love Is an Indispensable Part of Life"; Transliteration: "Jinsei ni Koi wa Tsukimono" (Japanese: 人生に恋はつきもの)	Junko Kōmura	July 8, 2018
23	"Status Gold"; Transliteration: "Suteitasu Gōrudo" (Japanese: ステイタス・ゴールド)	Junko Kōmura	July 15, 2018
24	"A Promise to Return Alive"; Transliteration: "Ikite Kaeru Yakusoku" (Japanese: 生きて帰る約束)	Junko Kōmura	July 22, 2018
25	"I Will Make You Stronger Than Ever"; Transliteration: "Saikō ni Tsuyoku Shiteyaru" (Japanese: 最高に強くしてやる)	Junko Kōmura	July 29, 2018
26	"The Underground Auction"; Transliteration: "Ura no Ōkushon" (Japanese: 裏のオークション)	Akatsuki Yamatoya	August 5, 2018
27	"Yes-Man Dancing"; Transliteration: "Iinari Danshingu" (Japanese: 言いなりダンシング)	Akatsuki Yamatoya	August 12, 2018
28	"More Fighting on My Birthday"; Transliteration: "Tanjōbi mo Tatakai de" (Japanese: 誕生日も戦いで)	Junko Kōmura	August 19, 2018
29	"Photos Are Memories"; Transliteration: "Shashin wa Kioku" (Japanese: 写真は記憶)	Kaori Kaneko	August 26, 2018
30	"The Two Are on a Date"; Transliteration: "Futari wa Ryokōchū" (Japanese: ふたりは旅行中)	Junko Kōmura	September 2, 2018
31	"The Gangler Who Surrendered"; Transliteration: "Jishu Shitekita Gyangurā" (Japanese: 自首してきたギャングラー)	Akatsuki Yamatoya	September 9, 2018
32	"A Challenge to a Duel"; Transliteration: "Kettō o Mōshikomu" (Japanese: 決闘を申し込む)	Akatsuki Yamatoya	September 16, 2018
33	"We Are the Young Phantom Thieves"; Transliteration: "Bokura wa Shōnen Kaitō-dan" (Japanese: 僕らは少年快盗団)	Junko Kōmura	September 23, 2018
34	"The Legendary Gun"; Transliteration: "Densetsu no Jū" (Japanese: 伝説の銃)	Junko Kōmura	September 30, 2018
35	"The Good, the Bad, and the Normal"; Transliteration: "Ii Hito, Warui Hito, Futsū no Hito" (Japanese: 良い人、悪い人、普通の人)	Junko Kōmura	October 7, 2018
36	"Shoot the Bomb"; Transliteration: "Bakudan o Ute" (Japanese: 爆弾を撃て)	Kaori Kaneko	October 14, 2018
37	"Your Place to Return"; Transliteration: "Kimi ga Kaeru Basho" (Japanese: 君が帰る場所)	Junko Kōmura	October 21, 2018
38	"The Collection Piece from Outer Space"; Transliteration: "Uchū kara no Korekushon" (Japanese: 宇宙からのコレクション)	Junko Kōmura	October 28, 2018
39	"Bet on This"; Transliteration: "Koitsu ni Kakeru" (Japanese: こいつに賭ける)	Junko Kōmura	November 11, 2018
40	"I Can't Stop Worrying"; Transliteration: "Shinpai ga Tomaranai" (Japanese: 心配が止まらない)	Akatsuki Yamatoya	November 18, 2018
41	"The Door to Another World"; Transliteration: "Isekai e no Tobira" (Japanese: 異世界への扉)	Junko Kōmura	November 25, 2018
42	"Time for Battle"; Transliteration: "Kessen no Toki" (Japanese: 決戦の時)	Junko Kōmura	December 2, 2018
43	"The Man Who Came Back"; Transliteration: "Kaettekita Otoko" (Japanese: 帰ってきた男)	Kaori Kaneko	December 9, 2018
44	"The Truth Found"; Transliteration: "Mitsuketa Shinjitsu" (Japanese: 見つけた真実)	Kaori Kaneko	December 16, 2018
45	"Looking Forward to Christmas"; Transliteration: "Kurisumasu o Tanoshimi ni" (Japanese: クリスマスを楽しみに)	Akatsuki Yamatoya	December 23, 2018
46	"An Inescapable Game"; Transliteration: "Nukedasenai Gēmu" (Japanese: 抜け出せないゲーム)	Junko Kōmura	January 6, 2019
47	"What I Can Do Right Now"; Transliteration: "Ima no Boku ni Dekiru Koto" (Japanese: 今の僕にできること)	Junko Kōmura	January 13, 2019
48	"The Face Behind the Mask"; Transliteration: "Kamen no Shita no Sugao" (Japanese: 仮面の下の素顔)	Junko Kōmura	January 20, 2019
49	"As a Phantom Thief, as a Police Officer"; Transliteration: "Kaitō to Shite, Keisatsu to Shite" (Japanese: 快盗として、警察として)	Junko Kōmura	January 27, 2019
50	"Forever Adieu"; Transliteration: "Eien ni Adyū" (Japanese: 永遠にアデュー)	Junko Kōmura	February 3, 2019
51 (Final)	"I Am Sure I Will See You Again"; Transliteration: "Kitto, Mata Aeru" (Japanese: きっと、また逢える)	Junko Kōmura	February 10, 2019

== Production ==
The Kaitou Sentai Lupinranger VS Keisatsu Sentai Patranger trademark was filed by Toei Company on September 11, 2017.

== Films & Specials ==
=== Theatrical ===
==== Kaitou Sentai Lupinranger VS Keisatsu Sentai Patranger - en Film ====
Kaitou Sentai Lupinranger VS Keisatsu Sentai Patranger en Film (快盗戦隊ルパンレンジャーVS警察戦隊パトレンジャー en film, Kaitō Sentai Rupanrenjā Bui Esu Keisatsu Sentai Patorenjā An Firumu) was released in Japan on August 4, 2018, double billed with Kamen Rider Build the Movie: Be the One. The events of the movie take place between Kaitou Sentai Lupinranger + Keisatsu Sentai Patranger: The Ultimate Weird Combination! and Keisatsu Sentai Patranger Feat. Kaitou Sentai Lupinranger: Another Patren 2gou. This is the last Heisei-era Super Sentai movie, released a year before the 2019 Japanese imperial transition.

==== Ryusoulger VS Lupinranger VS Patranger ====
Kishiryu Sentai Ryusoulger VS Lupinranger VS Patranger the Movie (劇場版 騎士竜戦隊リュウソウジャーVSルパンレンジャーVSパトレンジャー, Gekijōban Kishiryū Sentai Ryūsōjā Bui Esu Rupanrenjā Bui Esu Patorenjā) was released in Japan on February 8, 2020, as part of Super Sentai Movie Party (スーパー戦隊MOVIEパーティー, Sūpā Sentai Mūbī Pātī). The film features a crossover between Lupinranger VS Patranger and Kishiryu Sentai Ryusoulger, and was double-billed with Mashin Sentai Kiramager Episode Zero, the prequel short film for Mashin Sentai Kiramager.

==== Red Battle! All Sentai Great Assemble!! ====
Kikai Sentai Zenkaiger the Movie: Red Battle! All Sentai Great Assemble!! (機界戦隊ゼンカイジャー THE MOVIE 赤い戦い！オール戦隊大集会!!, Kikai Sentai Zenkaijā Za Mūbī Akai Tatakai! Ōru Sentai Daishūkai!!) is a film released in Japanese theaters on February 20, 2021, as part of Super Sentai Movie Ranger 2021 (スーパー戦隊MOVIEレンジャー2021, Sūpā Sentai Mūbī Renjā Nisen-nijū-ichi), alongside Mashin Sentai Kiramager the Movie: Be-Bop Dream and Kishiryu Sentai Ryusoulger Special: Memory of Soulmates. Naoya Makoto (Himitsu Sentai Gorenger), Kei Hosogai (Kaizoku Sentai Gokaiger), and Jingi Irie (Kaitou Sentai Lupinranger VS Keisatsu Sentai Patranger) reprise their respective roles, and Nobutoshi Canna (Doubutsu Sentai Zyuohger) and Megumi Han (Shuriken Sentai Ninninger) reprise their respective voice roles.

=== V-Cinema ===
==== Lupinranger VS Patranger VS Kyuranger ====
Lupinranger VS Patranger VS Kyuranger (ルパンレンジャーVSパトレンジャーVSキュウレンジャー, Rupanrenjā Bui Esu Patorenjā Bui Esu Kyūrenjā) is a V-Cinema release that features a crossover between Lupinranger VS Patranger and Uchu Sentai Kyuranger, also including Misao Mondo/Zyuoh The World from Doubutsu Sentai Zyuohger reprising his role. The V-Cinema was released on August 21, 2019. The events of the film take place between episodes 42 and 43.

==== Zenkaiger vs. Kiramager vs. Senpaiger ====
Kikai Sentai Zenkaiger vs. Kiramager vs. Senpaiger (機界戦隊ゼンカイジャーVSキラメイジャーVSセンパイジャー, Kikai Sentai Zenkaijā Tai Kirameijā Tai Senpaijā) is a V-Cinema release that features a crossover between Kikai Sentai Zenkaiger and Mashin Sentai Kiramager. It had a limited theatrical release on April 29, 2022, followed by its DVD and Blu-ray release on September 28, 2022. Additionally, Asahi Ito makes an appearance, reprising his role as Kairi Yano/Lupin Red, alongside Ryota Ozawa of Kaizoku Sentai Gokaiger reprising his role as Captain Marvelous/Gokai Red. The events of the V-Cinema take place after the final episode of Zenkaiger.

== Cast ==
- Kairi Yano: Asahi Ito (伊藤 あさひ, Itō Asahi)
- Tooma Yoimachi: Shogo Hama (濱 正悟, Hama Shōgo)
- Umika Hayami: Haruka Kudō (工藤 遥, Kudō Haruka)
- Keiichiro Asaka: Kousei Yuki (結木 滉星, Yūki Kōsei)
- Sakuya Hikawa: Ryo Yokoyama (横山 涼, Yokoyama Ryō)
- Tsukasa Myoujin: Kazusa Okuyama (奥山 かずさ, Okuyama Kazusa)
- Noël Takao: Seiya Motoki (元木 聖也, Motoki Seiya)
- Kogure: Yoichi Nukumizu (温水 洋一, Nukumizu Yōichi)
- Director Hilltop: Ike Nwala (アイクぬわら, Aiku Nuwara)
- Zamigo Delma: Jingi Irie (入江 甚儀, Irie Jingi)
- Shori Yano: Kōji Shiba (柴 浩二, Shiba Kōji)
- Aya Ohira: Nagisa Yuzuki (柚木 渚, Yuzuki Nagisa)
- Shiho Ichinose: Moka Komatsu (小松 もか, Komatsu Moka)

=== Voice cast ===
- Good Striker: Yūji Mitsuya (三ツ矢 雄二, Mitsuya Yūji)
- Jim Carter: Rie Kugimiya (釘宮 理恵, Kugimiya Rie)
- Dogranio Yarbun: Mitsuru Miyamoto (宮本 充, Miyamoto Mitsuru)
- Destra Maggio: Yūji Ueda (うえだ ゆうじ, Ueda Yūji)
- Gauche Le Mede: Ayana Taketatsu (竹達 彩奈, Taketatsu Ayana)
- Pordaman: Kazuki Komine (小峰 一己, Komine Kazuki).
- Modified Pordaman (red): Takashi Sato (佐藤 貴史, Satō Takashi).
- Narrator: Hiroki Yasumoto (安元 洋貴, Yasumoto Hiroki)
- Lupinranger/Patranger Equipment: Rondo Mimura (三村 ロンド, Mimura Rondo)

=== Guest cast ===
- Bundorute Peggy (ブンドルト・ペギー, Bundoruto Pegī; 5–6): Tadashi Mizuno (水野 直, Mizuno Tadashi)
- Shinta Yanagami (梁上 信太, Yanagami Shinta; 19): Kazuyuki Aijima (相島 一之, Aijima Kazuyuki)
- Koji Yamada (山田 浩二, Yamada Kōji; 35): The Touch (ザ・たっち, Za Tatchi)
- Restaurant customers (51): Mai Oishi (大石 麻衣, Ōishi Mai), Sumiko Tanaka (田中 澄子, Tanaka Sumiko), Yuki Nagata (永田 由紀, Nagata Yuki), Michiko Makino (牧野 美千子, Makino Michiko)
- Jackpot Striker (Voice; 51): Keiji Fujiwara (藤原 啓治, Fujiwara Keiji)

== Opening theme song ==
- "Lupinranger VS Patranger" (ルパンレンジャーVSパトレンジャー, Rupanrenjā Bui Esu Patorenjā)
  - Lyrics: Shoko Fujibayashi (藤林 聖子, Fujibayashi Shōko)
  - Composition: Hiroshi Takaki (高木 洋, Takaki Hiroshi)
  - Arrangement: Hiroshi Takaki (Project.R)
  - Artist: Project.R (Tatsuhiko Yoshida (吉田 達彦, Yoshida Tatsuhiko), Hitomi Yoshida (吉田 仁美, Yoshida Hitomi))
  This song is a mix of "Lupinranger, Dial o Mawase" (ルパンレンジャー、ダイヤルを回せ, Rupanrenjā, Daiyaru o Mawase; "Lupinranger, Turn the Dial") by Tatsuhiko Yoshida (Project.R) and "Chase You Up! Patranger" (Chase You Up! パトレンジャー, Cheisu Yū Appu! Patorenjā) by Hitomi Yoshida (Project.R).
