= Kizudarake no Akuma =

- Poster
- Kanji: 傷だらけの悪魔
- Directed by: Santa Yamagishi
- Based on: Kizudarake no Akuma by Volvox Sumikawa
- Starring: Rika Adachi
- Distributed by: Kadokawa
- Release date: 4 February 2017
- Running time: 97 minutes
- Country: Japan
- Language: Japanese

Kizudarake no Akuma (傷だらけの悪魔; Demon Covered in Scars) is a Japanese film directed by Santa Yamagishi, starring Rika Adachi and based on the manga of the same name by Volvox Sumikawa. It was released in Japan by Kadokawa on 4 February 2017.

== Cast ==
- Rika Adachi as Mai Kasai
- Manami Enosawa as Shino Odagiri
- Kayano Nakamura as Yuria Fujizuka
- Yui Okada as Shizuka Natori
- Tom Fujita as Tada Kuroki
- Koji Kominami as Atsushi Tōma
