= A Man Who Defies the World of BL =

Japanese manga series by Konkici

- Cover of the Japanese version of vol. 1, first released on April 9, 2019

絶対BLになる世界VS絶対BLになりたくない男 (Zettai BL ni Naru Sekai VS Zettai BL ni Naritakunai Otoko)
- Genre: Comedy, boys' love
- Manga
- Written by: Konkici
- Published by: Shodensha (volumes 1–3); Shinchosha (volumes 4–5)
- English publisher: NA: SuBLime
- Imprint: Feel Comics FC Jam (volumes 1–2); Feel Comics (volume 3); Bunch Comics Coral (volumes 4–5)
- Original run: November 7, 2018 – present
- Volumes: 6
- Television drama
- Directed by: Kōichirō Miki (seasons 1-2); Ryuichi Honda (season 3)
- Written by: Izumi Kawasaki
- Music by: Erina Koyama
- Licensed by: GagaOOLala; Viki
- Original network: CS TV Asahi Channel 1 (seasons 1-2); Lemino (season 3)
- Original run: March 27, 2021 – April 23, 2024
- Episodes: 13
- Manga

Zettai BL ni Naru Sekai & Zettai BL ni Naranai Kōkō Seikatsu
- Written by: Konkici
- Published by: Shinchosha
- Imprint: Bunch Comics Coral
- Original run: April 1, 2025 – present
- Volumes: 1

A Man Who Defies the World of BL (Japanese: 絶対BLになる世界VS絶対BLになりたくない男, Hepburn: Zettai BL ni Naru Sekai VS Zettai BL ni Naritakunai Otoko; lit. "A World That Definitely Becomes BL VS A Man Who Definitely Doesn't Want to Be in BL") is a Japanese manga series by Konkici. The manga is serialized digitally in Pixiv Comic and the manga mobile app Manga Jam since November 7, 2018.

A live-action television drama adaptation was released on March 27, 2021, and has run for four seasons.

== Plot ==
The protagonist, a plain-looking college student, discovers that he is living in a world where scenarios seen in boys' love stories are common, culminating in his male acquaintances falling in love. However, the protagonist wants to be nothing more than a background character and avoids getting into one of these situations himself, all while commenting on the events unfolding.

== Characters ==
Protagonist (主人公, Shujinko) (Note: The live-action television drama adaptation lists the protagonist's name as "Mob" (モブ, Mobu; lit. "background character").)
Voiced by: Yoshiki Nakajima (drama CD)
Portrayed by: Atsuhiro Inukai
The unnamed protagonist designates himself as a background character.
Ayato (綾人)
Voiced by: Reiou Tsuchida (drama CD)
Portrayed by: Yūtarō
Ayato is the protagonist's younger brother.
Tōjō (東條)
Voiced by: Takuya Eguchi (drama CD)
Portrayed by: Akihisa Shiono
Tōjō is Ayato's best friend and, eventually, boyfriend. His main character trait is being "so good-looking that roses appear around him."
Kikuchi (菊池)
Portrayed by: Asahi Ito
Kikuchi is the protagonist's best friend. His role in the story was greatly expanded for the television drama adaptation.
Uchiumi (内海)
Portrayed by: Koji Kominami
Yanagi (柳)
Voiced by: Hiro Shimono (drama CD)
Portrayed by: Shin Tamura
Yanagi is one of Ayato's friends who has an unrequited crush on him and is thus reluctant to have Tōjō around him. His main character trait is being "cute."
Kuroda (黒田)
Portrayed by: Yūya Uno
Kuroda is a high school student introduced in chapter 2 who falls in love with Yūki at first sight for not fearing his appearance. His main character trait is being an "delinquent."
Yūki (優希)
Portrayed by: Takuma Usa
Yūki is a high school student introduced in chapter 2 who falls in love with Kuroda at first sight. His main character trait is being an "honor student."
Ryōta (涼太)
Portrayed by: Masaki Yabe
Ryōta is one of the protagonist's friends introduced in chapter 3. His main character traits are being "energetic" and "air-headed."
Tōma (斗真)
Portrayed by: Ryōta Kobayashi
Tōma is one of the protagonist's friends introduced in chapter 3. His main character trait is being "good-looking."
Akihito (秋人)
Portrayed by: Shogo Hama
Akihito is one of the protagonist's classmates introduced in chapter 8. His main character trait is being "easily embarrassed."
Takimoto (滝本)
Portrayed by: Ryono Kusachi
Takimoto is one of the protagonist's classmates introduced in chapter 8 who worries about Akihito. His main character trait is being "cool."
Mayama (真山)
Voiced by: Nobuhiko Okamoto (drama CD)
Portrayed by: Hayate Wada
Mayama is a BL manga artist. His main character trait is being a "fudanshi", a male fan of BL.
Mizumoto (水元)
Voiced by: Toshiki Masuda (drama CD)
Mizumoto has the ability to read people's minds. He becomes increasingly frustrated by the protagonist's loud internal monologues.
Hatano (旗野)
Voiced by: Wataru Hatano (drama CD)
Portrayed by: Ryō Sekoguchi
Hatano is a high school student who suddenly confesses his love to the protagonist and has had feelings for him ever since they met in the past. He is also one of Ayato's friends. Hatano initially appeared in an "if" extra storyline of the manga, before eventually appearing in the main story.

== Media ==
=== Manga ===
A Man Who Defies the World of BL is written and illustrated by Konkici. It is serialized digitally on Pixiv Comic and the manga mobile app Manga Jam beginning on November 7, 2018. The chapters were later released in three bound volumes by Shodensha under the Feel Comics FC Jam imprint and the subsequent three volumes were published by Shinchosha.

A spin-off manga by Konkici titled Zettai BL ni Naru Sekai & Zettai BL ni Naranai Kōkō Seikatsu (絶対BLになる世界&絶対BLにならない高校生活, A World That Definitely Becomes BL & A High School Life That Will Definitely Not Be BL) began serializing digitally on the Kurage Bunch website on April 1, 2025. The first volume was released by Shinchosha.

An English-language translation was licensed by Viz Media under their SuBLime imprint, with the first volume published in August 2025.

==== Volume list ====
No.	Original release date	Original ISBN	English release date	English ISBN
1	April 8, 2019	978-4-396-79130-8	August 12, 2025	978-1-9747-5462-5
2	December 24, 2020	978-4-396-79173-5	November 11, 2025	978-1-9747-5877-7
3	April 8, 2022	978-4-396-79211-4	February 10, 2026	978-1-9747-6281-1
4	August 8, 2023	978-4-10-772625-4	May 12, 2026	978-1-9747-6326-9
5	October 8, 2024	978-4-10-772757-2	August 11, 2026	978-1-9747-6513-3
6	June 9, 2026	978-4-10-772952-1	—	—

==== Spin-off manga ====
No.	Japanese release date	Japanese ISBN
1	April 9, 2025	978-4-10-772818-0

=== Drama CDs ===
An audio drama CD was released on April 24, 2020, starring Yoshiki Nakajima as the protagonist, Reiou Tsuchida as Ayato, and Takuya Eguchi as Tōjō. The CD was packaged with an 8-page exclusive comic drawn by Konkici and a character song CD with Nakajima performing as his character. It charted at #44 on the Oricon Weekly Album Rankings upon its first week of release. A second drama CD released on May 26, 2021, with Hiro Shimono as Yanagi, Nobuhiko Okamoto, Kōhei Amasaki, Tatsuhisa Suzuki, and Wataru Hatano added as additional cast members. The second drama CD contains a 12-page exclusive comic drawn by Konkici. A third drama CD released on October 26, 2022, a fourth on August 23, 2023, and a fifth on November 8, 2024.

=== Television drama ===
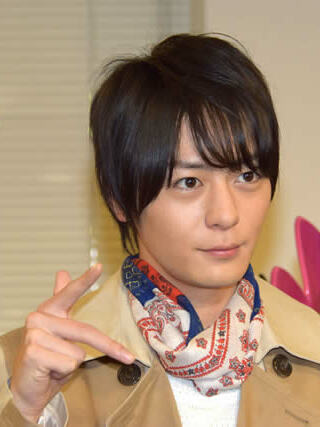
Atsuhiro Inukai (pictured in 2017) starred in the live-action drama adaptation.

A live-action television series adaptation was broadcast on February 18, 2021. The series will be airing weekly beginning on March 27, 2021, on CS TV Asahi Channel 1 at 9 PM, with simultaneous international broadcasts in South Korea, Taiwan, Thailand, Vietnam, the Philippines, Hong Kong, and Macao. It is directed by Kōichirō Miki, with Izumi Kawasaki in charge of the scriptwriting and Erina Koyama composing the music. Atsuhiro Inukai stars as the protagonist. Additional cast members include Yūtarō, Asahi Ito, Akihisa Shiono, Koji Kominami, Ryo Kitamura, Wataru Kuriyama, Fūma Sadamoto, Ryōta Kobayashi, Takuma Usa, Dish member Masaki Yabe, Shogo Hama, Yohdi Kondo, Kyōya Honda, and Shūya Sunagawa. Enjin members Taiga Nakamoto and Ryono Kusachi were later announced as additional cast members. The show's theme song is "Bubble Love" by Da-ice, with Da-ice member Hayate Wada making a special appearance in the show. The opening theme song is "Ore wa Mob" performed by the main cast of the drama, credited as "Atsuhiro Inukai with LoveBoys."

A second season was broadcast on March 20, 2022, with Kenta Izuka replacing Kominami as a series regular. A third season, titled A Man Who Defies the World of BL 2024, was announced on December 25, 2023, with the main cast reprising their roles. It is directed by Ryuichi Honda, with Izumi Kawasaki in charge of scripts and Erina Koyama in charge of the music. The third season is produced by Fine Entertainment, with Yoshimoto Broad Entertainment, NTT Docomo, and Fany Studio also included on the production team. The third season was streamed on Lemino on April 23, 2024.

Streaming platform Viki licensed the first season in English with a release date of July 23, 2021. Viki also licensed and released the second season in English.

==== Season 1 (2021) ====
No. overall	No. in season	Title	Directed by	Written by	Original release date
1	1	"VS Meeting"; Transliteration: "VS Deai" (Japanese: VS 出会い)	Kōichirō Miki	Izumi Kawasaki	March 27, 2021
1	1	"VS Drinking Party"; Transliteration: "VS Nomikai" (Japanese: VS 飲み会)	Kōichirō Miki	Izumi Kawasaki	March 27, 2021
"VS Meeting": The protagonist discovers that he lives in a world where BL romances happen and learns that his brother, Ayato, received a love confession from his best friend. On his way to university, the protagonist avoids interacting with others, causing Kuroda and Yūki to bump into each other and fall in love. During lunch, his friends Ryōta and Tōma fall in love.; "VS Drinking Party": The protagonist is invited to a drinking party by his classmate, Sakita, who also invites lone wolf Kaji, broken-hearted Akihito, and Takimoto. By the end of the evening, Sakita and Kaji fall in love while Akihito and Takimoto become a couple.
2	2	"VS My Brother's Friend"; Transliteration: "VS Otōto no Tomodachi" (Japanese: VS 弟の友だち)	Kōichirō Miki	Izumi Kawasaki	March 27, 2021 (digital streaming); April 3, 2021 (television broadcast)
2	2	"VS Group Blind Date"; Transliteration: "VS Gōkon" (Japanese: VS 合コン)	Kōichirō Miki	Izumi Kawasaki	March 27, 2021 (digital streaming); April 3, 2021 (television broadcast)
2	2	"VS Yaoi Fanboy"; Transliteration: "VS Fudanshi" (Japanese: VS 腐男子)	Kōichirō Miki	Izumi Kawasaki	March 27, 2021 (digital streaming); April 3, 2021 (television broadcast)
"VS My Brother's Friend": Ayato invites his friends over, including Tōjō, the person who confessed to him. The protagonist discovers that Ayato and his friends have a complicated love square relationship.; "VS Group Blind Date": The protagonist is invited to a group blind date by his classmate, Misaka. Uchiumi steals the girls' attention but expresses interest in the protagonist, causing the protagonist avoid him and have him pair up with Misaka instead. After the two men leave, the group date becomes a failure as the girls have lost interest.; "VS Yaoi Fanboy": The protagonist meets Mayama, who is secretly a BL manga artist, but avoids him. Mayama, who is a fan of male relationships, decides to watch over the relationships of other men, observing Hikaru and Shun falling in love and wishing that he lives in a world where BL romances are common.
3	3	"VS My Brother's Friend Part 2"; Transliteration: "VS Otōto no Tomodachi Pāto Tsū" (Japanese: VS 弟の友だち パート2)	Kōichirō Miki	Izumi Kawasaki	March 27, 2021 (digital streaming); April 10, 2021 (television broadcast)
3	3	"VS Flag"; Transliteration: "VS Furagu" (Japanese: VS フラグ)	Kōichirō Miki	Izumi Kawasaki	March 27, 2021 (digital streaming); April 10, 2021 (television broadcast)
"VS My Brother's Friend Part 2": Ayato realizes Tōjō is serious about him and starts to realize his own feelings for him when they become distant. The two make up and begin dating.; "VS Flag": The protagonist finds chocolate for Valentine's Day in his bag and later realizes they are from his classmate, Kikuchi. To avoid him, the protagonist has him sit with Miyoshi, only to have Miyoshi's boyfriend, Haruo, interrupt class.
4	4	"VS Flag Overtime"; Transliteration: "VS Furagu Enchōsen" (Japanese: VS フラグ延長戦)	Kōichirō Miki	Izumi Kawasaki	March 27, 2021 (digital streaming); April 17, 2021 (television broadcast)
The protagonist gets drunk and falls unconscious, but he learns that Kikuchi had carried him home. Kikuchi confesses to the protagonist that he has been in love ever since the protagonist spoke to him when he was feeling upset. Despite conscious efforts to avoid Kikuchi, the protagonist decides to confess his love to him.

==== Season 2 (2022) ====
No. overall	No. in season	Title	Directed by	Written by	Original release date
5	1	"VS Name"; Transliteration: "VS Namae" (Japanese: VS 名前)	Kōichirō Miki	Izumi Kawasaki	March 20, 2022
5	1	"VS Weakness"; Transliteration: "VS Jakuten" (Japanese: VS 弱点)	Kōichirō Miki	Izumi Kawasaki	March 20, 2022
"VS Name": Before the protagonist is about to confess to Kikuchi, Igarashi, Kikuchi's ex-boyfriend, interrupts them to take him back. The next day, the protagonist discovers that his classmates have gender-neutral names or nicknames and avoids being given a nickname.; "VS Weakness": Ayato tries to find Tōjō's weakness. The protagonist figures out Tōjō's weakness is waking up in the morning and realizes if Ayato does not know it, that means the two have not slept together. However, he also realizes Ayato's friend Minami has fallen for him.
6	2	"VS Pretty Girl"; Transliteration: "VS Bishōjo" (Japanese: VS 美少女)	Kōichirō Miki	Izumi Kawasaki	March 20, 2022 (digital streaming); March 27, 2022 (television broadcast)
6	2	"VS Lovers' Quarrel"; Transliteration: "VS Chiwa Genka" (Japanese: VS 痴話ゲンカ)	Kōichirō Miki	Izumi Kawasaki	March 20, 2022 (digital streaming); March 27, 2022 (television broadcast)
"VS Pretty Girl": While out with his friends, the protagonist runs into a girl but quickly realizes the girl is actually a man. When the protagonist avoids being involved with him, one of his friends falls in love instead.; "VS Lovers' Quarrel": The protagonist observes that his classmates have started having fights with their boyfriends, but he understands the fights also help make their relationships stronger. Ayato and Tōjō also get into a fight, but with the protagonist's encouragement, they make up.
7	3	"VS Handsome Younger Man"; Transliteration: "VS Toshishita no Ikemen" (Japanese: VS 年下のイケメン)	Kōichirō Miki	Izumi Kawasaki	March 20, 2022 (digital streaming); April 3, 2022 (television broadcast)
7	3	"VS Reunion"; Transliteration: "VS Saikai" (Japanese: VS 再会)	Kōichirō Miki	Izumi Kawasaki	March 20, 2022 (digital streaming); April 3, 2022 (television broadcast)
"VS Handsome Younger Man": The protagonist is hospitalized for a broken leg after falling down the stairs and shares his room with a high school student with amnesia from an accident. After the boy is reunited with his boyfriend, the protagonist pretends to have amnesia, but Kikuchi overhears him, shocked at the news.; "VS Reunion": When the protagonist is discharged from the hospital, he receives a letter from Kikuchi telling him that he rejected Igarashi and plans on studying abroad in the United States to become a veterinarian. Mayama, who is revealed to be an omnipotent force controlling the world, convinces the protagonist to profess his love for him. With help from Igarashi, the protagonist runs to see Kikuchi off at the airport.

== Reception ==
In 2019, A Man Who Defies the World of BL was shortlisted at #11 at the Next Manga Awards in the Web category held by the magazine Da Vinci. It was ranked at #4 at Pixiv and Nippon Shuppan Hanbai's Web Manga General Election.
