= Katsumi Asaba =

Japanese art director (born 1940)

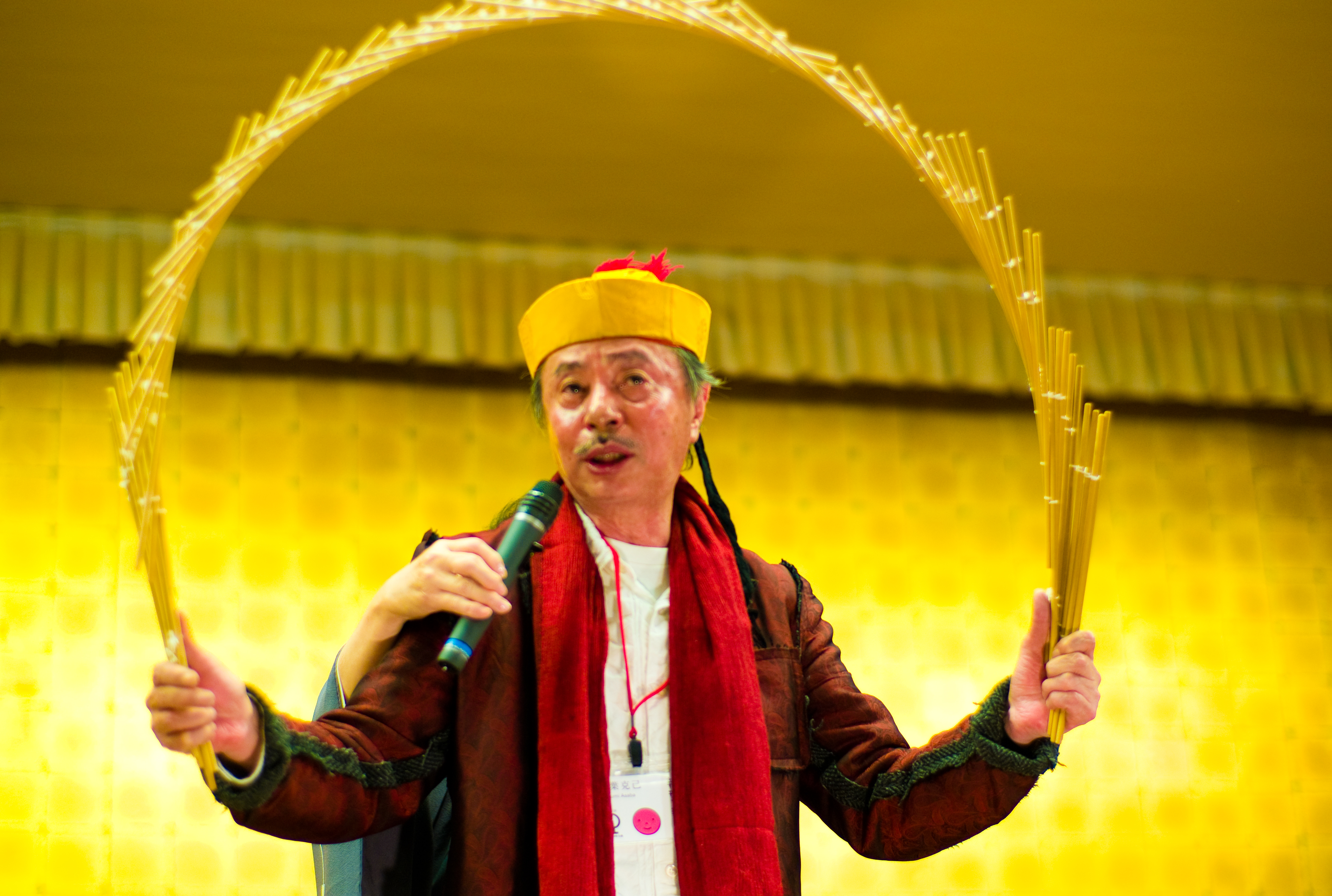
Katsumi Asaba doing Nankin Tamasudare

Katsumi Asaba (浅葉 克己; born March 18, 1940 in Yokohama) is a Japanese art director known for producing several acclaimed commercials and posters.
