= List of Kaitou Sentai Lupinranger VS Keisatsu Sentai Patranger episodes =

Kaitou Sentai Lupinranger VS Keisatsu Sentai Patranger is a 2018 Japanese television series, and is the 42nd entry of the long-running Super Sentai series produced by Toei Company and TV Asahi. The series features two teams of heroes: The Lupinrangers, a band of gentleman thieves, and the Patrangers, a police task force. Each with their own reasons, the two groups compete against each other to retrieve the Lupin Collection, a set of mysterious and powerful artifacts which were stolen by the Interdimensional Crime Group Gangler.

== Episodes ==
No.	English title Original Japanese title	Written by	Original release date
1	"The Troublemaking Phantom Thieves"; Transliteration: "Seken o Sawagasu Kaitō sa" (Japanese: 世間を騒がす快盗さ)	Junko Kōmura	February 11, 2018
The Interdimensional Crime Group Gangler is using the pieces of the elusive Lupin Collection to attack Earth, but Kairi Yano, Touma Yoimachi and Umika Hayami are three mysterious thieves who stand up against them as the Lupinrangers, with the objective of stealing the collection back from their hands.
2	"Global Police, Chase After Them"; Transliteration: "Kokusai Keisatsu, Tsuiseki seyo" (Japanese: 国際警察、追跡せよ)	Junko Kōmura	February 18, 2018
The Lupinrangers encounter the police officers Keiichiro Asaka, Sakuya Hikawa and Tsukasa Myoujin who have the ability to transform into the Patrangers. For the possession of the Lupin Collection, a three-way battle between the thieves, the cops and Gangler begins.
3	"We Will Take Them Back No Matter What"; Transliteration: "Zettai ni Torimodosu" (Japanese: 絶対に取り戻す)	Junko Kōmura	February 25, 2018
The Patrangers make a stop at Bistrot Jurer, unaware that it is the Lupinrangers' hideout. Touma then decides to take the opportunity and attempt to steal their VS Changers, but Kairi has another idea.
4	"An Unacceptable Relationship"; Transliteration: "Yurusarenai Kankei" (Japanese: 許されない関係)	Junko Kōmura	March 4, 2018
The Patrangers investigate mysterious disappearances occurring in closed rooms and a stuffed animal is the only clue they have.
5	"The Targeted Global Police"; Transliteration: "Nerawareta Kokusai Keisatsu" (Japanese: 狙われた国際警察)	Junko Kōmura	March 11, 2018
When the Patrangers get their hands on two new VS Vehicles, the Lupinrangers and Gangler appear to fight them for their possession.
6	"What to Protect"; Transliteration: "Mamoru Beki Mono wa" (Japanese: 守るべきものは)	Junko Kōmura	March 18, 2018
Keiichiro is upset about his defeat to Lupin Red and is eager for a rematch, but his companions step in to remind him where his heart should be.
7	"Always Being Saved"; Transliteration: "Itsumo Tasukerarete" (Japanese: いつも助けられて)	Junko Kōmura	March 25, 2018
When Kairi and Touma are in dire straits, Umika must find a way to save them, and invites Sakuya for a date as part of her plan.
8	"The Phantom Thieves' Identities"; Transliteration: "Kaitō no Shōtai" (Japanese: 快盗の正体)	Kaori Kaneko	April 1, 2018
Eager to uncover the Lupinrangers' true identities, the Patrangers are suspicious about the employees of Bistrot Jurer and set a trap for them.
9	"To See Them Again"; Transliteration: "Mō Ichido Au Tame ni" (Japanese: もう一度会うために)	Junko Kōmura	April 8, 2018
The Lupinrangers approach Emma Goldini, a French jewelry designer who can be in possession of a piece of the Lupin Collection, when Gangler appears to attack them.
10	"It Is Not Over Yet"; Transliteration: "Mada Owattenai" (Japanese: まだ終わってない)	Junko Kōmura	April 15, 2018
The Lupinrangers are devastated when one of the Lupin Collection pieces is apparently destroyed, ruining their chances to rescue their loved ones, until Kairi comes across Zamigo Delma, the same Gangler that is responsible for their disappearance, and decides to confront him.
11	"The Filming Must Go On"; Transliteration: "Satsuei wa Tsuzuku yo Doko made mo" (Japanese: 撮影は続くよどこまでも)	Kaori Kaneko	April 22, 2018
Worried about the increasing notoriety of the Lupinrangers, the GSPO decides to hold a PR event with the Patrangers, but things turn hectic when Sakuya is transformed into a girl.
12	"The Magic Bracelet"; Transliteration: "Mahō no Udewa" (Japanese: 魔法の腕輪)	Naruhisa Arakawa	April 29, 2018
The Lupinrangers grab another piece of the Lupin Collection that slips from their hands and comes in possession of a young boy who intends to use it to fulfill his dream.
13	"The Best and Worst Day Off"; Transliteration: "Saikō de Saitei na Kyūjitsu" (Japanese: 最高で最低な休日)	Naruhisa Arakawa	May 6, 2018
Tsukasa and Umika have a day off at the amusement park, when trouble appears before them.
14	"The Set Trap"; Transliteration: "Harimegurasareta Wana" (Japanese: はりめぐらされた罠)	Junko Kōmura	May 13, 2018
A kindergarteners' excursion to the mountains is suspended due to some strange activity and the Patrangers investigate the cause.
15	"A Police Officer's Duty"; Transliteration: "Keisatsukan no Shigoto" (Japanese: 警察官の仕事)	Junko Kōmura	May 20, 2018
After being poisoned in a trap, Keiichiro's life is in danger and his partners struggle to protect him, when the Lupinrangers step in to assist them.
16	"Because We Are Comrades"; Transliteration: "Nakama dakara koso" (Japanese: 仲間だからこそ)	Naruhisa Arakawa	May 27, 2018
The Lupinrangers must face a new enemy who snatches Touma's body and refuses to give it back.
17	"Secret Feelings"; Transliteration: "Himeta Omoi" (Japanese: 秘めた想い)	Naruhisa Arakawa	June 3, 2018
Umika becomes friends with a girl who is infatuated with Keiichiro and agrees to help with her crush, but first, they must face a Gangler with the power of trapping people within their dreams.
18	"The Secret of the Collection"; Transliteration: "Korekushon no Himitsu" (Japanese: コレクションの秘密)	Kaori Kaneko	June 10, 2018
The Patrangers confront an enemy that they believed to be already destroyed, when the Lupinrangers intervene.
19	"Compensation for Disobeying Orders"; Transliteration: "Meirei Ihan no Daishō" (Japanese: 命令違反の代償)	Naruhisa Arakawa	June 17, 2018
After getting himself in trouble, Sakuya is suspended for two weeks, but when he realizes his friends are in danger, he must choose between his career or his duties.
20	"The New Phantom Thief Is a Police Officer"; Transliteration: "Aratana Kaitō wa Keisatsukan" (Japanese: 新たな快盗は警察官)	Junko Kōmura	June 24, 2018
The Patrangers gain a new member: Noël Takao from the GSPO's main branch in France. But both Sentai teams are surprised when Noël reveals that he can transform into either a Lupinranger or a Patranger.
21	"Friend or Foe? On Board or Not?"; Transliteration: "Teki ka Mikata ka, Noru ka Noranai ka" (Japanese: 敵か味方か、乗るか乗らないか)	Junko Kōmura	July 1, 2018
As both the Lupinrangers and the GSPO have lots of questions to Noël, a new enemy capable of deflecting all attacks appears before them.
22	"Love Is an Indispensable Part of Life"; Transliteration: "Jinsei ni Koi wa Tsukimono" (Japanese: 人生に恋はつきもの)	Junko Kōmura	July 8, 2018
Noël decides to help with Sakuya's crush on Umika, until both have to join forces to rescue her from a Gangler.
23	"Status Gold"; Transliteration: "Suteitasu Gōrudo" (Japanese: ステイタス・ゴールド)	Junko Kōmura	July 15, 2018
Laimon Gaorfangue, a top Gangler member, decides to make a move in order to secure the position of Dogranio's successor, and when the instructor of a cooking school disappears under mysterious circumstances, Noël asks for Touma's help with the investigation.
24	"A Promise to Return Alive"; Transliteration: "Ikite Kaeru Yakusoku" (Japanese: 生きて帰る約束)	Junko Kōmura	July 22, 2018
The first member of Laimon's gang was defeated, and while the other two members are still on the large, a mysterious necklace draws the attention of both the Lupinrangers and the GSPO.
25	"I Will Make You Stronger Than Ever"; Transliteration: "Saikō ni Tsuyoku Shiteyaru" (Japanese: 最高に強くしてやる)	Junko Kōmura	July 29, 2018
With his subordinates defeated, Laimon confronts the Lupinrangers and the Patrangers, who are forced to join forces against him.
26	"The Underground Auction"; Transliteration: "Ura no Ōkushon" (Japanese: 裏のオークション)	Akatsuki Yamatoya	August 5, 2018
Noël and Umika infiltrate an illegal auction featuring a piece of the Lupin Collection to make a successful bid for it, but the situation gets complicated when the Patrangers appear at the scene.
27	"Yes-Man Dancing"; Transliteration: "Iinari Danshingu" (Japanese: 言いなりダンシング)	Akatsuki Yamatoya	August 12, 2018
Touma and Sakuya start training under a mysterious martial artist, unaware that they are under the effect of a Gangler's powers.
28	"More Fighting on My Birthday"; Transliteration: "Tanjōbi mo Tatakai de" (Japanese: 誕生日も戦いで)	Junko Kōmura	August 19, 2018
It's Umika's birthday and her father appears to visit her, when the Lupinrangers must deal with Dogranio's plan to shorten the lifespan of humanity.
29	"Photos Are Memories"; Transliteration: "Shashin wa Kioku" (Japanese: 写真は記憶)	Kaori Kaneko	August 26, 2018
Keiichiro's memories are stolen in one of Gauche's experiments with his teammates and the Lupinrangers seeking a way to restore him.
30	"The Two Are on a Date"; Transliteration: "Futari wa Ryokōchū" (Japanese: ふたりは旅行中)	Junko Kōmura	September 2, 2018
Pretending to have a vacation, Keiichiro leaves for a secret mission and Kairi approaches him to investigate, just when a seemingly harmless Gangler appears.
31	"The Gangler Who Surrendered"; Transliteration: "Jishu Shitekita Gyangurā" (Japanese: 自首してきたギャングラー)	Akatsuki Yamatoya	September 9, 2018
The Patrangers are surprised when a Gangler appears at the GSPO to turn himself in, Tsukasa wants to believe him, but Noël knew that it was an effect of a Lupin Collection piece as he tries to protect Tsukasa from the horrible truth.
32	"A Challenge to a Duel"; Transliteration: "Kettō o Mōshikomu" (Japanese: 決闘を申し込む)	Akatsuki Yamatoya	September 16, 2018
Gauche unleashes a powerful monster with multiple abilities, and Noël insists that the Patrangers must team up with the Lupinrangers again to face it, but Keiichiro opposes the idea, and they decide to settle it with a duel. When they join the others, Noël reveals that he won but in truth Keiichiro hesitated and allowed himself to lose.
33	"We Are the Young Phantom Thieves"; Transliteration: "Bokura wa Shōnen Kaitō-dan" (Japanese: 僕らは少年快盗団)	Junko Kōmura	September 23, 2018
The Lupinrangers are attacked by a Gangler who turns them into children with the Patrangers confiscating their VS Changers. Now the thieves must infiltrate the GSPO to retrieve their gear without being caught again.
34	"The Legendary Gun"; Transliteration: "Densetsu no Jū" (Japanese: 伝説の銃)	Junko Kōmura	September 30, 2018
The Patrangers have trouble against a Gangler with a powerful weapon in his hands, whilst the Lupinrangers follow a tip from Goodie about a rare piece of the Lupin Collection hidden by powerful traps. The final trap forces them to gun down those they are trying to rescue, which leads one of the thieves to make a startling realization about their destiny.
35	"The Good, the Bad, and the Normal"; Transliteration: "Ii Hito, Warui Hito, Futsū no Hito" (Japanese: 良い人、悪い人、普通の人)	Junko Kōmura	October 7, 2018
The Lupinrangers have a handful when a Gangler splits Kogure into three versions of him, each with a different personality. Whilst Kairi tries to wrangle all three versions and the Patrangers are doing the same for civilians, the others must try and find the Gangler despite being the interference of an unexpected ally.
36	"Shoot the Bomb"; Transliteration: "Bakudan o Ute" (Japanese: 爆弾を撃て)	Kaori Kaneko	October 14, 2018
Sakuya gets upset with himself for accidentally shooting at his fellow Patrangers during a mission. Sakuya then makes amends by getting Keiichiro a necklace which mellows his anger, unaware that they fell into a Gangler's plot.
37	"Your Place to Return"; Transliteration: "Kimi ga Kaeru Basho" (Japanese: 君が帰る場所)	Junko Kōmura	October 21, 2018
The Lupirangers and the Patrangers are facing a Gangler who teleports them back home every time they get close to confront him, forcing them to formulate a rather unusual way to outsmart the enemy.
38	"The Collection Piece from Outer Space"; Transliteration: "Uchū kara no Korekushon" (Japanese: 宇宙からのコレクション)	Junko Kōmura	October 28, 2018
The Lupinrangers and the Patrangers are racing against each other to secure a VS Vehicle flying above Earth, while facing a Gangler capable of controlling vehicles by his own will.
39	"Bet on This"; Transliteration: "Koitsu ni Kakeru" (Japanese: こいつに賭ける)	Junko Kōmura	November 11, 2018
Zamigo Delma reappears and determined to avenge his brother, Kairi confronts him using his new VS Vehicle while Noël Takao uncovers some interesting info about the enemy.
40	"I Can't Stop Worrying"; Transliteration: "Shinpai ga Tomaranai" (Japanese: 心配が止まらない)	Akatsuki Yamatoya	November 18, 2018
Kairi is behaving stranger than usual, and his colleagues decide to follow him, just when a Gangler appears on their way and uses his powers to make them even more worried about him.
41	"The Door to Another World"; Transliteration: "Isekai e no Tobira" (Japanese: 異世界への扉)	Junko Kōmura	November 25, 2018
Touma and Tsukasa get stranded in the Gangler homeworld and must work together to return home, the former taking care to maintain his cover.
42	"Time for Battle"; Transliteration: "Kessen no Toki" (Japanese: 決戦の時)	Junko Kōmura	December 2, 2018
The Lupinrangers and the Patrangers are attacked by Destra Maggio, one of Gangler's top echelons, and must give their all against him if they want to survive.
43	"The Man Who Came Back"; Transliteration: "Kaettekita Otoko" (Japanese: 帰ってきた男)	Kaori Kaneko	December 9, 2018
While the Lupinrangers confront a Gangler who doesn't possesses a piece of the Lupin Collection, the Patrangers are reunited with Patren 2gou candidate Satoru Shinonome who reveals to them that Noël is more than he appears and could not be trusted.
44	"The Truth Found"; Transliteration: "Mitsuketa Shinjitsu" (Japanese: 見つけた真実)	Kaori Kaneko	December 16, 2018
Revealed to have originated from the same dimension as the Gangler, Noël must now deal having losing the trust of the Lupinrangers and the Patrangers as he is forced to reveal his full story to them.
45	"Looking Forward to Christmas"; Transliteration: "Kurisumasu o Tanoshimi ni" (Japanese: クリスマスを楽しみに)	Akatsuki Yamatoya	December 23, 2018
Sakuya invites his fellow Patrangers to help with a Christmas party, only to learn that the Gangler member Samon Shakekistantine is stealing chicken dinners. Matters worsen upon confirmation of how Gangler members assume human disguises.
46	"An Inescapable Game"; Transliteration: "Nukedasenai Gēmu" (Japanese: 抜け出せないゲーム)	Junko Kōmura	January 6, 2019
On New Year's day, the Lupinrangers are trapped in an illusionary world by a Gangler and Keiichiro discovers that some of Zamigo's victims include Kairi, Touma and Umika's loved ones and is once again suspicious of them.
47	"What I Can Do Right Now"; Transliteration: "Ima no Boku ni Dekiru Koto" (Japanese: 今の僕にできること)	Junko Kōmura	January 13, 2019
Though Keiichiro is certain about the Lupinrangers' identities, Sakuya refuses to accept Umika to be Lupin Yellow and confronts her. Meanwhile, Gauche upgrades Zamigo behind Dogranio's back as the two devise a plan to destroy the two Sentai teams together.
48	"The Face Behind the Mask"; Transliteration: "Kamen no Shita no Sugao" (Japanese: 仮面の下の素顔)	Junko Kōmura	January 20, 2019
Noël surrenders himself to Gauche, who intended to dissect him before Dogranio decides to hold a broadcast public execution to force the Lupinrangers and Patrangers into an obvious trap.
49	"As a Phantom Thief, as a Police Officer"; Transliteration: "Kaitō to Shite, Keisatsu to Shite" (Japanese: 快盗として、警察として)	Junko Kōmura	January 27, 2019
With their identities exposed, the Lupinrangers get into hiding while learning the significance behind Dogranio's golden safe. While the Patrangers keep looking for them, with Lupin Red settling things with Zamigo, Dogranio decides to call out both Sentai teams for a final confrontation.
50	"Forever Adieu"; Transliteration: "Eien ni Adyū" (Japanese: 永遠にアデュー)	Junko Kōmura	February 3, 2019
The Lupinrangers and Zamigo's showdown reaches its climatic conclusion while the Patrangers fight to defend the city against Dogranio and his forces.
51 (Final)	"I Am Sure I Will See You Again"; Transliteration: "Kitto, Mata Aeru" (Japanese: きっと、また逢える)	Junko Kōmura	February 10, 2019
The Patrangers have their final battle against Dogranio, who greatly overpowers them until the Lupinrangers use their collection book to extract all the pieces in Dogranio's possession so the Patrangers and Patren X can defeat him. Using the Lupinrangers within his safe as hostages, Dogranio is spared but ends up arrested and imprisoned by the GSPO. A year later, the Patrangers go after Karzemie, a surviving member of the Gangler group, when the Lupinrangers arrive. Kairi and the others explain that they were saved by Jackpot Striker and their loved ones, whom Noël and Kogure trained for the task. But when the Lupinrangers reveal they are after the final piece of the Lupin Collection in Karzemie's possession and seemingly still intend to obtain the Patrangers' gear, an all-out-fight breaks out over it before the two Sentai teams friendly fight against each other, though Noël still secretly intend to unite two teams into a true Sentai team in the future.
