= Nankin Tamasudare =

Traditional Japanese street performance

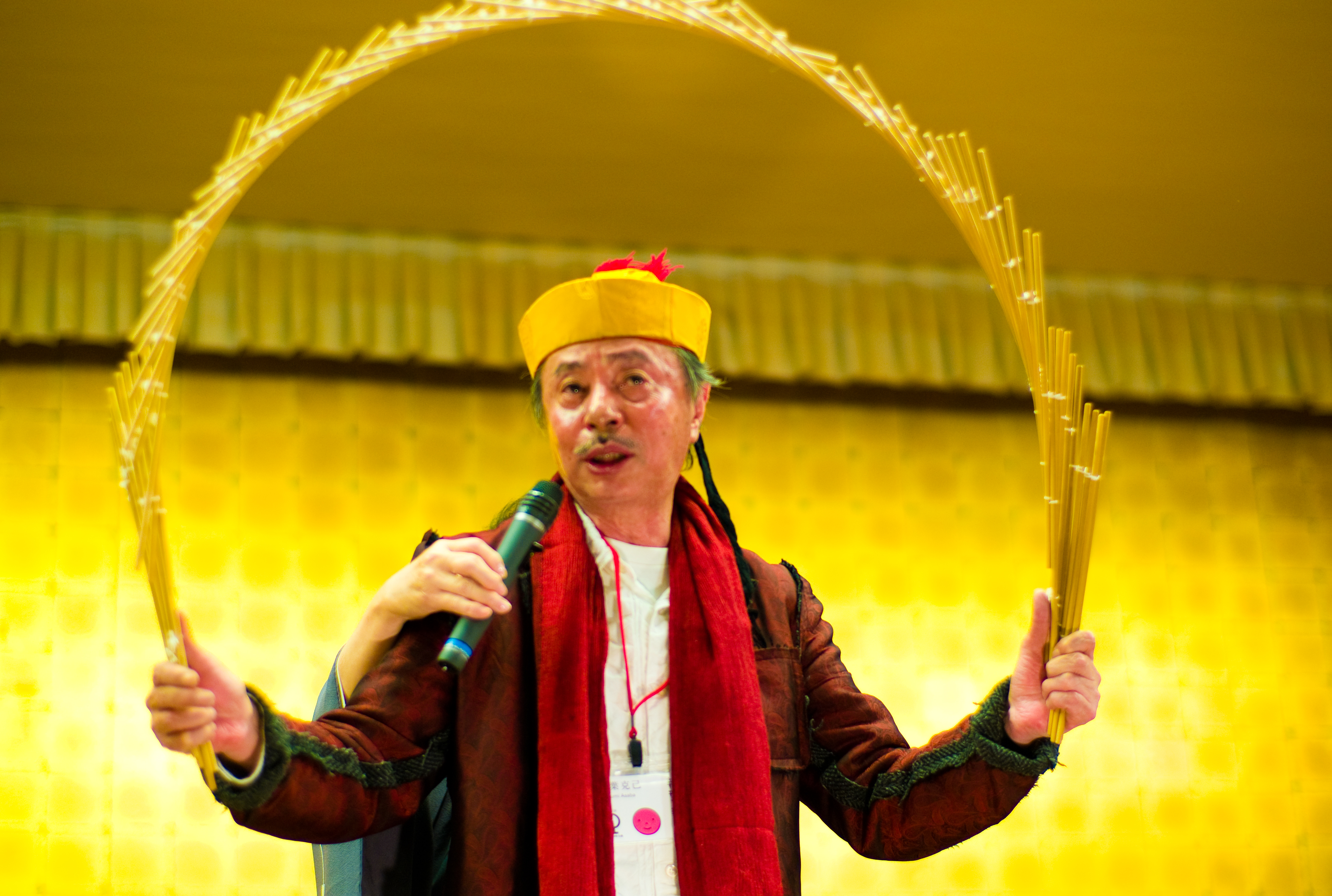
Katsumi Asaba performs Nankin Tamasudare

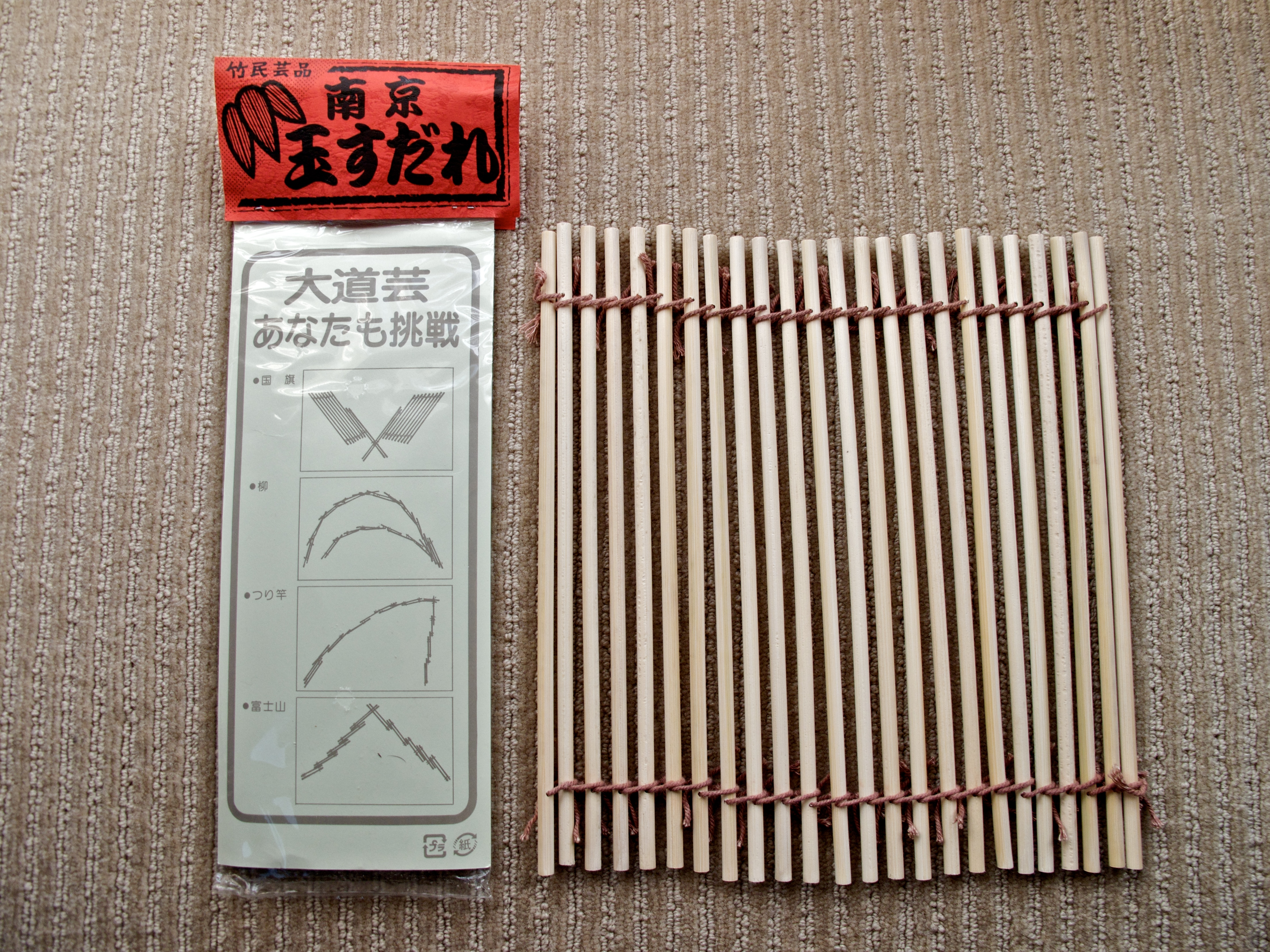
A commercially packaged Nankin Tamasudare set

Nankin tamasudare (南京玉簾 or 南京玉すだれ, Nankin-tamasudare; lit. "Nanjing Lily") is a kind of traditional Japanese street performance. The name "Nankin tamasudare" is a play on words, as it can mean a kind of flower, as well as mean something like "a wondrous woven screen" (sudare is a kind of screen made by weaving straw with twine.)

The performance consists of a person skilled in manipulating special screens made of loosely woven sticks, as well as chanting an accompanying kind of poetry. The performer chants a rhythmic poem as he or she uses the screen to portray the objects in the poetry without stopping. The screen is twisted, folded, extended, etc., in many different ways to portray an object, and then brought back quickly to its original screen shape. The chant usually ends with a pun: kaeru nai has the double meaning that there is no frog (カエル, kaeru) under the willow tree, and the willow tree figure cannot return (帰る, kaeru) easily to the original shape. The story ends with the willow tree figure, with the performer slowly packing up the mat after the performance.

Nankin tamasudare is said to have been a popular form of entertainment that began in the Edo period. Today, it is sometimes performed at Japanese cultural festivals.

== Chant ==
There are many variations of lyrics used for the performance, but below is a set that one might hear when observing a performance. The reference to Tokyo Tower, built in 1958, is a modern addition.

Japanese
アさて アさて

アさて さて さて さて
さては南京玉すだれ
チョイと伸ばせば
浦島太郎さんの
魚釣り竿に
チョイと似たり
浦島太郎さんの
魚釣り竿が
お目にとまれば
おなぐさみ
お目にとまれば
元へと返す
元へと返す

アさて アさて
さては南京玉すだれ
チョイと返せば
瀬田の唐橋
唐金擬宝珠
擬宝珠ないのが おなぐさみ
瀬田の唐橋
お目にとまれば
元へと返す
元へと返す

アさて アさて
さては南京玉すだれ
チョイと伸ばせば
チョイと返せば
おらが在所の
ご門でござる
おらの在所
ご門が
お目にとまれば
炭焼き小屋へと
早変わり
炭焼き小屋が
お目にとまれば
元へと返す
元へと返す

アさて アさて
さては南京玉すだれ
東海道は
五十と三次
中山道は
六十と九次
あまたの宿々
なくてならぬは
蕎麦屋の看板
蕎麦屋の看板
お目にとまれば
元へと返す
元へと返す

アさて アさて
さては南京玉すだれ
チョイと返せば
チョイと伸ばせば
端午の節句は
鯉ののぼりに
さも似たり
五月の鯉が
お目にとまれば
東京タワーと
早変わり
東京タワーが
お目にとまれば
元へと返す
元へと返す

アさて アさて
さては南京玉すだれ
チョイと伸ばせば
阿弥陀如来か
釈迦牟尼か
後光が見えれば
おなぐさみ
阿弥陀如来が
お目にとまれば
元へと返す
元へと返す

アさて アさて
さては南京玉すだれ
チョイと伸ばせば
チョイと返せば
日本三景
天橋立
浮かぶ白帆に
さも似たり
浮かぶ白帆が
お目にとまれば
元へと返す
元へと返す

アさて アさて
さては南京玉すだれ
チョイと返せば
日米国旗に
さも似たり
日米国旗が
お目にとまれば
しだれ柳に
早変わり
しだれ柳に
飛びつく蛙
蛙いないが
おなぐさみ
アさて アさて
アさて さて さて さて
アさて アさて さては南京玉すだれ

Rōmaji
a-sate, a-sate

a-sate, sate, sate, sate
sate wa Nankin Tamasudare
chotto nobaseba
urashimatarō-san no
sakana tsurizao ni
chotto nitari
urashimatarō-san no
sakana tsurizao ga
ome ni tomareba
onagusami
ome ni tomareba
moto e to kaesu
moto e to kaesu

a-sate, a-sate
sate wa Nankin Tamasudare
choito kaeseba
seta no karahashi
Tōkin giboshi
giboshi nai noga onagusami
seta no karahashi
ome ni tomareba
moto e to kaesu
moto e to kaesu

a-sate, a-sate
sate wa Nankin Tamasudare
choito nobaseba
choito kaeseba
ora ga zaisho no
gomon de gozaru
ora no zaisho no
gomon ga
ome ni tomareba
sumiyaki koya he to
hayagawari
sumiyaki koya ga
ome ni tomareba
moto e to kaesu
moto e to kaesu

a-sate, a-sate
sate wa Nankin Tamasudare
tōkaidō wa
goju to santsugi
nakasendo wa
rokuju to kutsugi
amata no yadoyado
nakutenaranu wa
sobaya no kanban
sobaya no kanban
ome ni tomareba
moto e to kaesu
moto e to kaesu

a-sate, a-sate
sate wa Nankin Tamasudare
choito kaeseba
choito nobaseba
tango no sekku wa
koi no nobori ni
samo nitari
gogatsu no koi ga
ome in tomareba
Tōkyō Tawā to
hayagawari
Tōkyō Tawā ga
ome ni tomareba
moto e to kaesu
moto e to kaesu

a-sate, a-sate
sate wa Nankin Tamasudare
choito nobaseba
amida nyorai ka
shakamuni ka
gokō ga miereba
onagusami
amida nyorai ga
ome ni tomareba
moto e to kaesu
moto e to kaesu

a-sate, a-sate
sate wa Nankin Tamasudare
choito nobaseba
choito kaeseba
nihon sankei
ama no hashidate
ukabu shiraho ni
samo nitari
ukabu shiraho ga
ome in tomareba
moto e to kaesu
moto e to kaesu

a-sate, a-sate
sate wa Nankin Tamasudare
choito kaeseba
nichibei kokki ni
samo nitari
nichibei kokki ga
ome ni tomareba
shidare yanagi ni
hayagawari
shidare yanagi ni
tobitsuku kaeru
kaeru inai ga
onagusami
a-sate, a-sate
a-sate, sate, sate, sate
a-sate, a-sate, sate wa Nankin Tamasudare

Translation
Hurry, hurry

hurry, hurry, hurry, hurry
Hurry, it's the Nanjing Woven Screen
Extend it just a little
and it looks a bit like
Urashima Tarō's
fishing rod!
Finding
Urashima Tarō's
fishing rod
is sure to amuse.
Once you see the rod,
the screen regains its shape,
regains its former shape

Hurry, hurry
Hurry, it's the Nanjing Woven Screen
Turn it in a bit
It's the Chinese bridge of Seta!
As for bronze post tops,
Here there are no ornamental post tops.
The Chinese bridge of Seta!
After you recognize it,
the screen regains its shape,
regains its former shape

Hurry, hurry
Hurry, it's the Nanjing Woven Screen!
Extend it just a bit
flip it just a bit
Look, it's the gate...
the gate to my house!
Once you see the gate,
the gate to my house,
A quick gesture and...
the front gate becomes a
charcoal-making shed!
Once you take a gander at
the charcoal-making shed,
the screen regains its shape,
regains its former shape

Hurry, hurry
Hurry, it's the Nanjing Woven Screen
There are fifty-three stations
along the Tōkaidō
and sixty-nine stations
along the Nakasendō.
Not all the buildings
are traveling inns to stay.
See the sign to a
buckwheat noodle shop.
Notice the sign and
the screen regains its shape
regains its former shape

Hurry, hurry
Hurry, it's the Nanjing Woven Screen
Turn it 'round a bit
Stretch it out a bit
And it looks somewhat like
a flying carp
at Boy's Day!
Once you take a gander at the
flying carp of May
A flick of the wrist
and look, it's Tokyo Tower!
Once you catch a glimpse
of wondrous Tokyo Tower,
the screen regains its shape,
regains its former shape

Hurry, hurry
Hurry, it's the Nanjing Woven Screen
Stretch it out a bit...
Is it the Amitābha Buddha,
Or is it Śākyamuni?
See the shimmering halo?
what a delightful sight!
Once you see the halo
shining 'round the Buddha,
the screen regains its shape,
regains its former shape

Hurry, hurry
Hurry, it's the Nanjing Woven Screen
Stretch it out a bit
Turn it in a bit
It looks somewhat like
A white floating sail
along the Bridge to Heaven
one of Japan's Three Greatest Sights
Once you can see
the white floating sail,
the screen regains its shape,
regains its former shape

Hurry, hurry
Hurry, it's the Nanjing Woven Screen
Turn it just a bit
It looks somewhat like
the flags of US and Japan
Once you see
the flags of US and Japan
A quick change and
it's a weeping willow
In the weeping willow
there is no leaping frog
There is no frog. / It doesn't regain its former shape. (Double entendre)
Entertaining, isn't it!
Hurry, hurry
hurry, hurry, hurry, hurry
Hurry, it's the Nanjing Woven Screen

== See also ==
- Sudare
