= Ayuko =

- Gender: Female

Origin
- Origin: Japanese
- Meaning: Different meanings depending on the kanji used

Ayuko (written: 鮎子 or 亜由子) is a feminine Japanese given name. Notable people with the name include:

- Ayuko Hatta (八田 鲇子), Japanese shōjo manga artist
- Ayuko Ito (伊藤 亜由子; born 1986), Japanese short track speed skater
- Ayuko Kato (加藤 鮎子; born 1979), Japanese politician
- Ayuko Suzuki (鈴木 亜由子; born 1991), Japanese long-distance runner
- Ayuko Tsukahara (塚原 あゆ子), Japanese director

== Fictional characters ==
- Ayuko Oka (丘 歩子), a character in the manga series Mysterious Girlfriend X
- Ayuko Uehara (上原 歩子), a character in the manga series Aiura
