= Ryō Ikuemi =

Japanese manga artist

Ryō Ikuemi いくえみ綾
- Born: October 2, 1964 (age 62) Nayoro, Hokkaidō
- Areas: Writer, Manga artist
- Notable works: Pops; Bara-Iro no Ashita; Kiyoku Yawaku
- Awards: 2000 Shogakukan Manga Award for shōjo 2009 Kodansha Manga Award for shōjo

Ryō Ikuemi (Japanese: いくえみ綾, Hepburn: Ikuemi Ryō; born October 2, 1964 in Nayoro, Hokkaido, Japan) is a Japanese shōjo manga artist.

== Career ==
In the beginning of her career, she published mainly in the manga magazine Margaret, where she debuted in 1979 at age 15 with Maggie. In 1993, her high school romance Pops was adapted as an OVA by Madhouse. Until the end of the 1990s, she was an exclusive artist for Bessatsu Margaret. She received the 2000 Shogakukan Manga Award for shōjo for the series Barairo no Ashita ("Rose-Colored Tomorrow"), which she created for the magazine.

In 1998, she decided to also do freelance work for other magazines than Bessatsu Margaret. She published a short story in the newly-founded Cookie magazine. She created the series Kiyoku Yawaku for the magazine, which won her the 2009 Kodansha Manga Award for shōjo. In 2013, Kiyoku Yawaku was adapted into a live-action film starring Masami Nagasawa and Masaki Okada. Ikuemi drew the cover art for Kazuyoshi Saito's October 2013 single "Kagerō", which was the film's theme song.
