= Ima Koi =

Japanese manga series

- Ima Koi: Now I'm in Love
- Cover of the first volume

今、恋をしています。 (Ima, Koi o Shiteimasu)
- Genre: Drama, romance
- Manga
- Written by: Ayuko Hatta
- Published by: Shueisha
- English publisher: NA: Viz Media
- Imprint: Margaret Comics
- Magazine: Bessatsu Margaret
- Original run: December 13, 2019 – January 13, 2023
- Volumes: 9

Ima Koi: Now I'm in Love (Japanese: 今、恋をしています。, Hepburn: Ima, Koi o Shiteimasu) is a Japanese manga series written and illustrated by Ayuko Hatta. It began serialization in Shueisha's Bessatsu Margaret magazine in December 2019. The series' individual chapters were collected into nine volumes from April 2020 to February 2023.

== Publication ==
Written and illustrated by Ayuko Hatta, the series was serialized in Shueisha's Bessatsu Margaret magazine from December 13, 2019 to January 13, 2023. The series' individual chapters were collected into nine tankōbon volumes from April 24, 2020, to February 24, 2023.

In July 2021, Viz Media announced that they licensed the series for English publication.

=== Volumes ===
No.	Original release date	Original ISBN	English release date	English ISBN
1	April 24, 2020	978-4-08-844344-7	March 1, 2022	978-1-9747-2895-4
2	August 25, 2020	978-4-08-844371-3	June 7, 2022	978-1-9747-2973-9
3	December 24, 2020	978-4-08-844420-8	September 6, 2022	978-1-9747-2974-6
4	May 25, 2021	978-4-08-844487-1	December 6, 2022	978-1-9747-2975-3
5	September 24, 2021	978-4-08-844530-4	March 7, 2023	978-1-9747-3239-5
6	January 25, 2022	978-4-08-844578-6	June 6, 2023	978-1-9747-3702-4
7	June 23, 2022	978-4-08-844611-0	September 5, 2023	978-1-9747-4041-3
8	October 25, 2022	978-4-08-844701-8	December 5, 2023	978-1-9747-4103-8
9	February 24, 2023	978-4-08-844726-1	March 5, 2024	978-1-9747-4320-9

== Reception ==
Rebecca Silverman from Anime News Network praised the main characters and their dynamic, while criticizing the story and artwork as generic. Sheena McNeil from Sequential Tart praised the story and characters as realistic; she also praised the artwork, believing it to be simple but effective.
