= Riko (model) =

Japanese actress (born 2002)

- 莉子
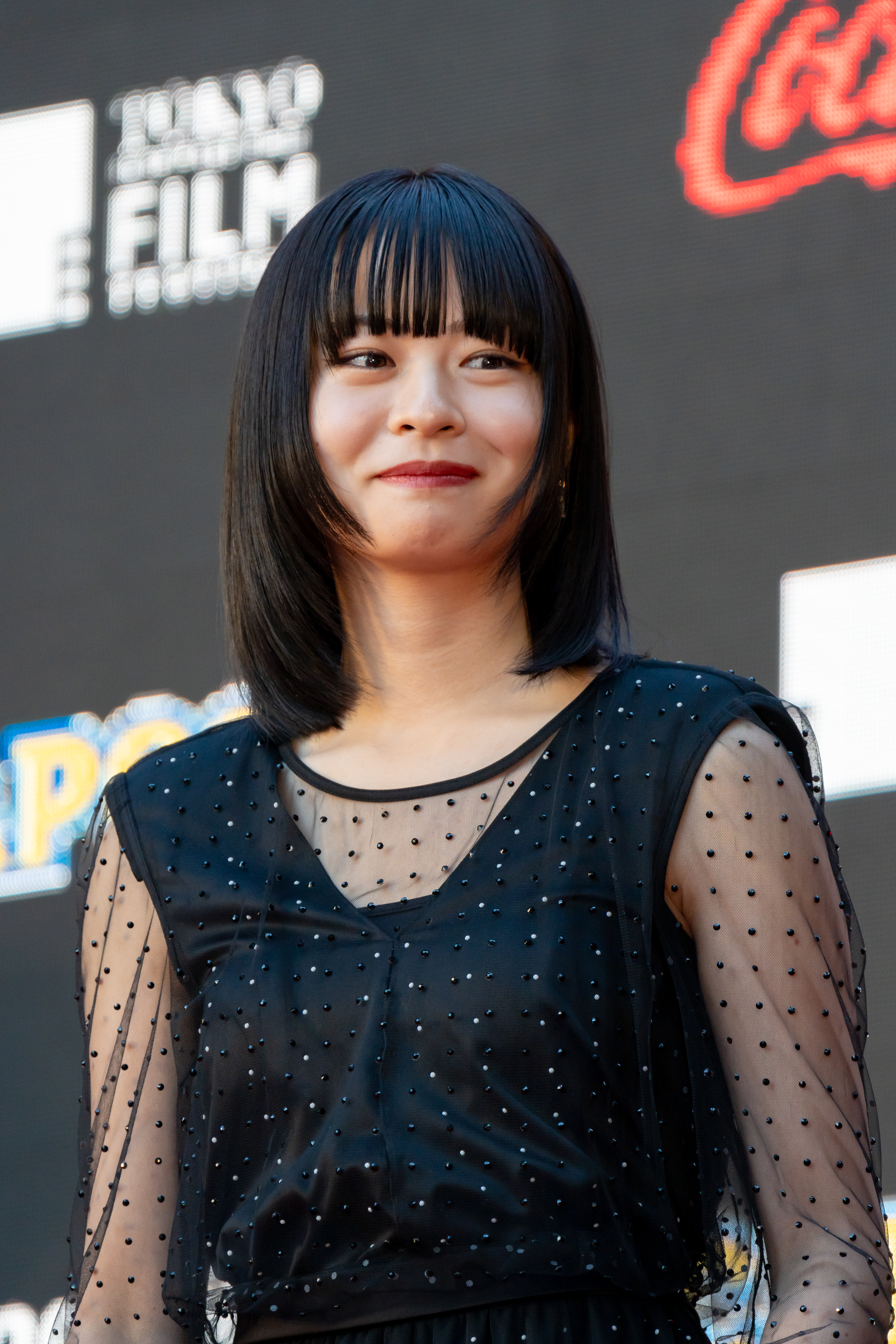
- Riko at the 36th Tokyo International Film Festival in October 2023
- Born: December 4, 2002 (age 23); Kanagawa Prefecture, Japan
- Occupations: Model; actress
- Years active: 2014–present
- Agent: NDPromotion
- Height: 158 cm (5 ft 2 in)

Riko (莉子, Riko; born December 4, 2002 in Kanagawa Prefecture) is a Japanese actress and model. who affiliated with NDPromotion. She is former exclusive model for Popteen.

== Biography ==
In June 2014, when she was in sixth grade, she applied to all runways of the fashion show that her favorite fashion brand, Anap Girl, was open to the public, and became a web model for the brand.

In June 2017, she won the Junior Block Award, a special prize for junior high school students, at the Zipper model audition. She appeared as a model in the Zipper Summer issue. In March 2018, she graduated from Anap Girl's modeling. On March 31 of the same year, she became a regular model for the magazine of Popteen, and exclusive model. She also made her debut as an actress in the Don't Toke, Summer.

In 2018 around May, her videos posted on TikTok became famous, and she gained many followers.

In 2019, she made her first appearance on the cover April edition for Popteen. In the same year, as a Popteen model and high school student, she was appointed as the MC for Asahi Broadcasting Television's video posting variety show, Bukatsu ONE! Broadcasting Club. From January 5, 2020, she appeared in AbemaTV's romance reality show Don't be Fooled by the Moon and the Wolf Girl. A month after that she was ranked first in the Favorite Model Ranking for the first time in March 2020 issue of Popteen. In June 2020 she appeared on the cover of Popteen for the first time. She also made her first drama debut in the Distortion Girl.

Her first leading role in a serial drama was Black Cinderella which aired during the summer of 2021. In June of the same year, she graduated as an exclusive model with the July 2021 issue of Popteen magazine as the only model for the magazine. She also made a guest appearance in the drama Metropolitan Police Department Zero Section – Life Safety Division Anything Counseling Room, which was her first appearance in a terrestrial drama. After that, she started to get regular roles, one of which was in Fight Song.

She made her first stage appearance in the play Holy Monster held at the New National Theater during the spring of 2023. She appear in live action film, And Yet, You Are So Sweet. In June 2023, she announced that she would be joining in a live-action television drama adaptation of Ao Haru Ride for two season.

== Filmography ==
=== Film ===
Year	Title	Role	Notes	Ref.
2019	Parallel School Days: The Movie	Kokuchi Naruko		
2020	God of Novels	Chitani Hinako		
2022	The Blue Skies at Your Feet	Marui Sakiko		
2022	Ox-Head Village	Mitsuki		
2022	To Be Killed by a High School Girl	Kimishima Kyoko		
2022	Kisaragi Station	Matsui Miki		
2023	Scroll	Haru		
2023	And Yet, You Are So Sweet	Obara Chika		
2023	Love Will Tear Us Apart	Yamaguchi Kanna		
2023	Take Me to Another Planet	Mucchan	Lead role	
2024	We Don't Know Love Yet	Izumi Shiozaki		
2027	Leviathan	Aya Yahiro		

=== Drama ===
Year	Title	Role	Notes	Ref.
2024	Informa	Hirose		
