= Innocently, Softly =

Japanese manga series by Ryo Ikuemi

- Cover of the last volume of Innocently, Softly

潔く柔く (Kiyoku Yawaku)
- Genre: Romantic drama
- Manga
- Written by: Ryo Ikuemi
- Published by: Shueisha
- English publisher: Shueisha (digital)
- Magazine: Cookie
- Original run: November 25, 2004 – 2010
- Volumes: 13
- Live-action film
- Directed by: Takehiko Shinjō
- Written by: Satomi Oshima; Sachiko Tanaka; Ryo Ikuemi
- Music by: Yoshihiro Ike
- Studio: C&I Entertainment
- Released: 2013
- Runtime: 127 minutes

Innocently, Softly (潔(きよ)く柔く, Kiyoku Yawaku), also known as Beyond the Memories, is a Japanese manga series by Ryo Ikuemi. It won the 2009 Kodansha Manga Award for shōjo. Kanna and Roku's story arcs (acts 2, 6, and 10) were adapted into a live action film in 2013.

In 2026, the manga became licensed digitally in English on Shueisha's Manga Million platform.

== Plot ==
The series is told in ten vignettes from different characters.

- Act 1: Yuma
- Act 2: Kanna
- Act 3: Hiroki
- Act 4: Ai
- Act 5: Ichie
- Act 6: Roku
- Act 7: Momoka
- Act 8: Nene
- Act 9: Asami
- Act 10: Kanna

== Characters ==
Kanna Seto (瀬戸 カンナ, Seto Kanna)
Kanna works in the movie advertising company, Melon Works. While cheerful and friendly, Kanna uses her optimism to hide her true feelings. When she was 15 years old, her childhood friend and crush was killed in a car accident, which she feels guilty about. She appears in acts 2, 4, 5, 7, and 10.
Roku Akazawa (赤沢 禄, Akazawa Roku)
Roku is an editor at the publishing company, Pleasure, and is very kind and easygoing. During a school trip from when he was in 4th grade, he accidentally pushed his classmate, Nozomi Kakanouchi, onto the road, where she got run over by a car. He remains guilty over causing her death, but learns to fully accept and cope when visiting her death site with her older sister, Manami. He feels drawn towards Kanna because of their similar experiences, and keeps an eye out for her. He appears in act 6, 8, and 10.

== Live-action film adaptation ==
Innocently, Softly was adapted into a theatrical film released on December 26, 2013. The film was produced by C&I Entertainment, distributed by Toho and starred Masami Nagasawa and Masaki Okada. "Kagerō" by Kazuyoshi Saito served as the theme song for the movie.

Innocently, Softly was screened as part of the 17th annual Japanese Film Festival in Melbourne, Australia. It premiered on October 18, 2013, via the Tokyo International Film Festival and had its theatrical release in Japan on October 26, 2013.

=== Cast ===
- Masami Nagasawa as Kanna Seto
- Masaki Okada as Roku Akazawa
- Haru as Asami Kawaguchi
- Aoi Nakamura as Toshikuni Mayama
- Yuki Furukawa as Kiyomasa Komine
- Kaoru Hirata as Momoka Senke
- Ryosei Tayama as bar master
- Toshihiro Wada as Yanagihara
- Megumi as Chikako Nobara
- Chizuru Ikewaki as Aimi Sakuraba (Kakinouchi)
- Kengo Kora as Kazue Haruta
- Aiyu Otaki as Mutsumi Sakuraba

=== Reception ===
Innocently, Softly opened at seventh place in the Japanese box office, raking in takings of 86 million yen in its opening weekend. Despite its below-average box office performance, Chizuru Ikewaki won the "Best Actress" award for her role in Innocently, Softly at the 6th Tama Film Awards in Japan.

The film received mostly positive reviews from critics outside of its home country. The Society for Film criticised the long runtime and large number of subplots, whilst saying that overall "Despite these minor reservations, Beyond The Memories stands out as a moving, attractive and thought-provoking film" with particular praise going towards Shinjo's direction. The AU Review praised the film, saying "It is well worth a watch because it is a sweet story without too much clutter from love triangles and jealousy. What sets the film apart is that it's a love story with where the two main characters are filled with a pain they are trying to hide from the world", awarding it three and a half stars out of five.
