= Cinderella Closet =

Japanese manga series

- First tankōbon volume cover

シンデレラクロゼット (Shinderera Kurozetto)
- Genre: Romance; Slice of life
- Manga
- Written by: Wakana Yanai
- Published by: Shueisha
- English publisher: NA: Seven Seas Entertainment
- Imprint: Margaret Comics
- Magazine: Bessatsu Margaret
- Original run: June 13, 2019 – January 13, 2022
- Volumes: 8
- Television drama
- Directed by: Ryōsuke Fukawa; Kana Torii; Hironobu Okano
- Written by: Ayako Katō; Satsuki Orito
- Studio: TBS Sparkle
- Original network: TBS
- Original run: July 2, 2025 – September 16, 2025
- Episodes: 12

Cinderella Closet (Japanese: シンデレラクロゼット, Hepburn: Shinderera Kurozetto) is a Japanese manga series written and illustrated by Wakana Yanai. It was serialized in Shueisha's shōjo manga magazine Bessatsu Margaret from June 2019 to January 2022. A live-action television drama adaptation aired between July and September 2025.

== Synopsis ==
When Haruka Fukunaga transfers from her rural school to university in Tokyo, she has high hopes for student life. But Tokyo is expensive, and so she has to work alongside her studies, leaving her no time for partying or romance. Her part-time job at a local bar, however, introduces her to Kurotaki, with whom she falls in love, even though he's already in a relationship. Then, over after-work drinks, she learns that he's broken up with his girlfriend and arranges to meet him for her birthday. When Haruka decides to get dressed up and buy some new clothes, she's overwhelmed by the choices. She's never paid much attention to fashion or makeup before. Then she happens to run into her beautiful neighbor, Hikaru, who gives her a hand. Hikaru is a makeup artist and does Haruka's makeup for their date. Unfortunately, Kurotaki forgets this and goes out for drinks with her and some colleagues instead. He turns out to be different from what she had imagined and Hikaru also reveals some surprising sides to her.

== Characters ==
Haruka Fukunaga (福永春香, Fukunaga Haruka)
Portrayed by: Ichika Osaki
Hikaru Kamiyama (神山光, Kamiyama Hikaru)
Portrayed by: Leo Matsumoto
Keisuke Kurotaki (黒滝圭佑, Kurotaki Keisuke)
Portrayed by: Rintarō Hachimura
Shū Kiriya (桐谷周, Kiriya Shū)
Portrayed by: Karuma
Mio Suzuki (鈴木美央, Suzuki Mio)
Portrayed by: Yuna Mito

== Media ==
=== Manga ===
Written and illustrated by Yakana Wanai, Cinderella Closet was serialized in Shueisha's shōjo manga magazine Bessatsu Margaret from June 13, 2019, to January 13, 2022. Its chapters have been collected in eight tankōbon volumes released from October 25, 2019, to February 25, 2022. The series is licensed in English by Seven Seas Entertainment.

No.	Original release date	Original ISBN	North American release date	North American ISBN
1	October 25, 2019	978-4-08-844257-0	April 4, 2023	978-1-68579-679-2
Stages 1–4
2	February 25, 2020	978-4-08-844305-8	July 11, 2023	978-1-68579-686-0
Stages 5–8
3	June 25, 2020	978-4-08-844352-2	October 3, 2023	978-1-68579-896-3
Stages 9–12
4	October 23, 2020	978-4-08-844383-6	January 2, 2024	978-1-68579-897-0
Stages 13–16
5	February 25, 2021	978-4-08-844476-5	April 2, 2024	979-8-88843-343-0
Stages 17–20
6	June 24, 2021	978-4-08-844497-0	July 9, 2024	979-8-88843-658-5
Stages 21–24
7	October 25, 2021	978-4-08-844527-4	October 8, 2024	979-8-89160-176-5
Stages 25–28
8	February 25, 2022	978-4-08-844599-1	January 7, 2025	979-8-89160-224-3
Stages 29–32

=== Drama ===
In May 2025, a live-action television drama adaptation was announced. The drama is produced by TBS Sparkle and directed by Ryōsuke Fukawa, Kana Torii, and Hironobu Okano, with scripts written by Ayako Katō and Satsuki Orito. It premiered on TBS' "Drama Stream" programming block on July 2, 2025, with advance streaming on Netflix on June 24, 2025.
