= Airu Kubozuka =

Japanese actor

- 窪塚愛流
- Born: October 3, 2003 (age 23); Kanagawa Prefecture, Japan
- Occupation: Actor
- Years active: 2018–present
- Agent: Ten Carat
- Notable work: Atari no Kitchen! as Kiyomasa Nakae; Koi o Shiranai Bokutachi wa as Naohiko Bessho
- Parent(s): Yōsuke Kubozuka (father); Toshiaki Toyoda (uncle)

Airu Kubozuka (窪塚愛流, Kubozuka Airu; born October 3, 2003 in Kanagawa Prefecture) is a Japanese actor.

== Biography ==
Airu was born on 3 October 2003 in Kanagawa Prefecture and is the son of the famous actor, Yōsuke Kubozuka.

While he was on set watching his father, during the filming of Planetist directed by Toshiaki Toyoda, he was unexpectedly approached by the director himself. Toyoda suggested he audition for a role in The Miracle of Crybaby Shottan, and when he did, he secured the part, making his debut as the younger version of Ryuhei Matsuda in the film.

On April 18, 2021, he made his first appearance on television, guest-starring in the second episode of the drama Nemesis. Later that October, he landed his first regular role in a series, starring in the This first love is fiction.

The following year, in early 2022, he joined the cast of the drama Fight Song, marking his first regular appearance in a golden time series. That same year on November, he was recognized as one of the next-generation stars, winning the 39th Best Jeanist Award.

In 2024, he took on his first leading role in a film, co-starring with Aju Makita in Happiness. In August of the same year he appeared in the live action film of We Who Know Nothing of Love.

== Filmography ==
=== Film ===
Year	Title	Role	Notes	Ref(s)
2021	The Miracle of Crybaby Shottan	Shogi Seiji		
2022	The World of You	Inami Yusuke		
2023	Sayonara, Girls.	Sato Shun		
2024	Love You as the World Ends: The Final	Fujimaru Reiji		
2024	Where Love Goes	Ito Sosuke	Lead role	
2024	Happiness	Kunikida Yukio	Lead role	
2024	We Don't Know Love Yet	Bessho Naohiko		
2025	Under the Big Onion	Fukawa		
2025	The Killer Goldfish			
2025	There Was Such a Thing Before	Shin'ichi Yamamoto		
2025	Transcending Dimensions	(voice)		
2026	Cursed Meme	Rion Kusakabe		

=== Television series ===
Year	Title	Role	Notes	Ref(s)
2021	Nemesis	Kamiya Itsuki	Episode 2	
2021	If Only I had Kissed You Then	Tanaka Yutaro		
2022	Fight Song	Toshiya		
2022	Othello	Arisaka Toru		
2022	Idiot Kiss	Yugo Irie		
2022	Sashidashinin wa, Daredesuka?	Hiroto Baba		
2023	The Best Student: The Last Dance with One Year Left to Live	Ryutaro Suhara		
2023	The Greatest Teacher	Ryutaro Suhara		
2023	Seasoned Connections	Kiyomasa Nakae		
2024	Make Up with Mud	Yuzuhara Sota		
2025	Mr. Mikami's Classroom	Kenta Tsugimoto		
2026	Lunacy	Kensho Naruse		
