= Machida-kun no Sekai =

Japanese manga series

- First tankōbon volume cover

町田くんの世界 (Machida-kun no Sekai)
- Genre: Slice of life
- Manga
- Written by: Yuki Andō
- Published by: Shueisha
- Magazine: Bessatsu Margaret
- Original run: March 13, 2015 – April 13, 2018
- Volumes: 7

Machida-kun no Sekai (町田くんの世界; lit. The World of Machida) is a Japanese manga series written and illustrated by Yuki Andō. It was serialized in Shueisha's Bessatsu Margaret from 2015 to 2018. The manga received a live-action film adaptation directed by Yuya Ishii that was released on June 7, 2019, as Almost a Miracle. A stage musical adaptation ran from March 29 to April 14, 2024, at the Hibiya Theatre Creation in Tokyo.

The manga won Andō the New Face Award at the 19th Japan Media Arts Festival Awards in 2015. In 2016, it was nominated for the 9th Manga Taishō and won the New Creator Prize at the 20th Tezuka Osamu Cultural Prize. The manga ranked third place in the 2016 Kono Manga ga Sugoi! guide's list of manga for female readers.

== Plot ==
Machida is a quiet and socially awkward boy whose grade is slightly below average. He thinks there is nothing special about himself except people who trust him.

== Publication ==
Machida-kun no Sekai is written and illustrated by Yuki Andō. It was serialized in Shueisha's shōjo manga magazine Bessatsu Margaret from March 13, 2015, to April 13, 2018. Shueisha collected its chapters in seven tankōbon volumes, released from July 24, 2015, to May 25, 2018.

=== Volume list ===
No.	Japanese release date	Japanese ISBN
1	July 24, 2015	978-4-08-845421-4
1. "Today's Machida-kun" (今日の町田くん, Kyō no Machida-kun); 2. "A Troubled Wound" (不安な傷口, Fuan na Kizuguchi); 3. "A Love Letter Comes Suddenly" (ラブレターは突然に, Rabu Retā wa Totsuzen ni); 4. "Rainy Day Crisis" (雨天日クライシス, Uten Hi Kuraishisu)
2	November 25, 2015	978-4-08-845485-6
5. "Welcome to This World" (ようこそ、この世界へ, Yōkoso, Kono Sekai e); 6. "Wonderful Lunch" (素敵なランチ, Suteki na Ranchi); 7. "The Thorn of Retrospect, Festival Night" (追憶の刺、祭の夜, Tsuioku no Toge, Matsuri no Yoru); 8. "First Love Wedding" (初恋ウエディング, Hatsukoi Uedingu)
3	March 25, 2016	978-4-08-845541-9
9. "The World is Beautiful" (世界は美しい, Sekai wa Utsukushii); 10. "A Stubborn Boy" (頑なボーイ, Katakuna Bōi); 11. "You Think of Somebody" (誰かを想うこと, Dareka o Omou Koto); Extra. Ai, Aru Seikatsu (愛、ある生活)
4	November 25, 2016	978-4-08-845670-6
12. "The World of Inohara-san" (猪原さんの世界, Inohara-san no Sekai); 13. "Family and Not Family" (家族と家族じゃない人, Kazoku to Kazoku ja nai Hito); 14. "Happy Miracle New Year" (ハッピーミラクルニューイヤー, Happī Mirakuru Nyū Iyā); 15. "Valentine's Day is Complicated" (バレンタインは難しい, Barentain wa Muzukashii)
5	April 25, 2017	978-4-08-845747-5
16. "Ever-changing World" (流れる世界, Nagareru Sekai); 17. "Seventeen" (セブンティーン, Sebuntīn); 18. "A Witch Moved In" (引越してきた魔女, Hikkoshite Kita Majo); 19. "The Start of a Love" (恋のはじまり, Koi no Hajimari)
6	October 25, 2017	978-4-08-845837-3
20. "The World is Full of Dreams and Wishes" (世界に溢れる夢と願いと, Sekai ni Afureru Yume to Negai to); 21. "Let's Go Camping" (キャンプへ行こう, Kyanpu e Ikō); 22. "Character Piece" (性格的小品, Seikakuteki Shōhin); 23. "Beyond Friendship" (友達のその先, Tomodachi no Sonosaki)
7	May 25, 2018	978-4-08-844037-8
24. "The World Falls in Love" (恋する世界, Koisuru Sekai); 25. "Lost Family" (家族は迷子, Kazoku wa Maigo); 26. "Going Out On Christmas" (おでかけクリスマス, Odekake Kurisumasu); 27. "Today's Machida-kun Part II" (今日の町田くん パートII, Kyō no Machida-kun Part II)
