= We Don't Know Love Yet =

Japanese manga series

- First tankōbon volume cover

恋を知らない僕たちは (Koi o Shiranai Bokutachi wa)
- Genre: Romantic drama
- Manga
- Written by: Minami Mizuno
- Published by: Shueisha
- English publisher: Shueisha (digital)
- Imprint: Margaret Comics
- Magazine: Bessatsu Margaret
- Original run: June 13, 2017 – May 13, 2021
- Volumes: 11
- Live-action film
- Directed by: Mai Sakai
- Written by: Haruka Okita
- Studio: Shochiku
- Released: August 23, 2024
- icon

We Don't Know Love Yet (Japanese: 恋を知らない僕たちは, Hepburn: Koi o Shiranai Bokutachi wa) is a Japanese manga series written and illustrated by Minami Mizuno. It was serialized in Shueisha's shōjo manga magazine Bessatsu Margaret from June 2017 to May 2021, with its chapters collected in eleven tankōbon volumes. A live-action film adaptation premiered in August 2024.

== Characters ==
Eiji Aihara (相原 英二, Aihara Eiji)
Portrayed by: Ryūsei Ōnishi
Naohiko Bessho (別所 直彦, Bessho Naohiko)
Portrayed by: Airu Kubozuka
Izumi Shiosaki (汐崎 泉, Shiosaki Izumi)
Portrayed by: Riko
Mizuho Ikezawa (池澤 瑞穂, Ikezawa Mizuho)
Portrayed by: Sara Shida
Taichi Senami (瀬波 太一, Senami Taichi)
Portrayed by: Sōya Igari
Koharu Fujimura (藤村 小春, Fujimura Koharu)
Portrayed by: Nagisa Saitō

== Media ==
=== Manga ===
Written and illustrated by Minami Mizuno, We Don't Know Love Yet was published in Shueisha's shōjo manga magazine Bessatsu Margaret from June 13, 2017, to May 13, 2021. Shueisha collected its chapters in eleven tankōbon volumes, released from October 25, 2017, to June 24, 2021.

The series became digitally available in English on Shueisha's Manga Million platform in 2026.

==== Volumes ====
No.	Release date	ISBN
1	October 25, 2017	978-4-08-845840-3
2	January 25, 2018	978-4-08-845881-6
3	May 25, 2018	978-4-08-844039-2
4	September 25, 2018	978-4-08-844097-2
5	January 25, 2019	978-4-08-844156-6
6	May 24, 2019	978-4-08-844201-3
7	September 25, 2019	978-4-08-844246-4
8	February 25, 2020	978-4-08-844302-7
9	September 25, 2020	978-4-08-844350-8
10	February 25, 2021	978-4-08-844381-2
11	June 24, 2021	978-4-08-844498-7

=== Live-action film ===
In April 2024, it was announced that the manga would receive a live-action film adaptation, which premiered on August 23 of the same year. The film is directed by Mai Sakai, with scripts by Haruka Okita.

== See also ==
- Rainbow Days, another manga series by the same author
