= My First Love With You Again =

Japanese manga series

- First tankōbon volume cover

君を忘れる恋がしたい (Kimi o Wasureru Koi ga Shitai)
- Genre: Romance
- Manga
- Written by: Haru Yuuki
- Published by: Shueisha
- English publisher: NA: Yen Press
- Imprint: Margaret Comics
- Magazine: Bessatsu Margaret
- Original run: September 13, 2023 – present
- Volumes: 9

My First Love With You Again (君を忘れる恋がしたい, Kimi o Wasureru Koi ga Shitai) is a Japanese manga series written and illustrated by Haru Yuuki. It began serialization in Shueisha's shōjo manga magazine Bessatsu Margaret in September 2023.

== Synopsis ==
Shino and Sena became a couple in a middle school, but were forced to go their separate ways once Sena transfers to another school. Now in college, Shino who still holds on to her feelings for Sena finds out that he attends the same college as her. She later discovers that Sena is very different than what she remembers of him.

== Publication ==
Written and illustrated by Haru Yuuki, My First Love With You Again began serialization in Shueisha's shōjo manga magazine Bessatsu Margaret on September 13, 2023. Its chapters have been compiled into nine tankōbon volumes as of October 2026.

During their panel at San Diego Comic-Con 2026, Yen Press announced that they had licensed the series for English publication, with the first volume set to release in January 2027.

No.	Original release date	Original ISBN	North American release date	North American ISBN
1	February 22, 2024	978-4-08-843002-7	January 26, 2027	979-8-85-543204-6
2	May 23, 2024	978-4-08-843010-2	—	—
3	September 25, 2024	978-4-08-843051-5	—	—
4	January 23, 2025	978-4-08-843090-4	—	—
5	May 23, 2025	978-4-08-843139-0	—	—
6	September 25, 2025	978-4-08-843184-0	—	—
7	January 23, 2026	978-4-08-843223-6	—	—
8	May 25, 2026	978-4-08-843262-5	—	—
9	October 23, 2026	978-4-08-843313-4	—	—

== Reception ==
The series was ranked third in the Nationwide Publishers Recommended Comics of 2025 list.
