= Barairo no Ashita =

Japanese manga series

- Cover of the first volume of Barairo no Ashita

バラ色の明日
- Genre: Slice of life, romance
- Manga
- Written by: Ryo Ikuemi
- Published by: Shueisha
- Magazine: Bessatsu Margaret
- Original run: 13 September 1997 – 15 August 1999
- Volumes: 6

Barairo no Ashita (バラ色の明日; lit. "Rose-Colored Tomorrow") is a Japanese slice of life romance shōjo manga series written and illustrated by Ryo Ikuemi and serialized by Shueisha on Bessatsu Margaret magazine. It has five volumes, the first published on 13 September 1997 and the last on 15 August 1999.

== Reception ==
It won the 45th Shogakukan Manga Award for shōjo manga.
