= Tsuki no Oki ni Mesu Mama =

Japanese manga series

- First tankōbon volume cover

月のお気に召すまま
- Genre: Romantic comedy
- Manga
- Written by: Ramune Kiuchi
- Published by: Shueisha
- Imprint: Margaret Comics
- Magazine: Bessatsu Margaret
- Original run: November 13, 2018 – November 13, 2024
- Volumes: 13
- icon

Tsuki no Oki ni Mesu Mama (月のお気に召すまま) is a Japanese manga series written and illustrated by Ramune Kiuchi. It was serialized in Shueisha's shōjo manga magazine Bessatsu Margaret from November 2018 to November 2024, with its chapters collected in thirteen tankōbon volumes.

== Characters ==
Ayumu Kamei (亀井 歩, Kamei Ayumu)
Voiced by: Ayane Sakura (audio drama)
Runa Takishima (滝島 月, Takishima Runa)
Voiced by: Yoshitsugu Matsuoka (audio drama)

== Publication ==
Written and illustrated by Ramune Kiuchi, Tsuki no Oki ni Mesu Mama was first published as a one-shot in Shueisha's shōjo manga magazine The Margaret on April 24, 2018, and was serialized in Bessatsu Margaret from November 13, 2018, to November 13, 2024. Shueisha collected its chapters in thirteen tankōbon volumes, released from September 25, 2019, to January 23, 2025.

=== Volumes ===
No.	Release date	ISBN
1	September 25, 2019	978-4-08-844247-1
2	October 25, 2019	978-4-08-844256-3
3	February 25, 2020	978-4-08-844303-4
4	July 22, 2020	978-4-08-844364-5
5	December 24, 2020	978-4-08-844422-2
6	May 25, 2021	978-4-08-844485-7
7	October 25, 2021	978-4-08-844538-0
8	March 25, 2022	978-4-08-844601-1
9	September 22, 2022	978-4-08-844677-6
10	February 24, 2023	978-4-08-844684-4
11	October 25, 2023	978-4-08-844794-0
12	June 25, 2024	978-4-08-843008-9
13	January 23, 2025	978-4-08-843091-1
