= Seasoned Connections =

Japanese manga series

- First tankōbon volume cover, featuring Zenjirō Nakae (left) and Kiyomi Atari (right)

あたりのキッチン! (Atari no Kitchin!)
- Genre: Comedy; Cooking
- Manga
- Written by: Yuki Shirono
- Published by: Kodansha
- Imprint: Afternoon KC
- Magazine: Monthly Afternoon
- Original run: November 25, 2016 – September 25, 2018
- Volumes: 4
- Television drama
- Directed by: Kazayuki Iwata (Kyodo TV); Makoto Kikukawa; Toahiyuki Honma; Takao Kinoshita
- Written by: Natsu Hashimoto; Nishioka to Neil
- Music by: Akihiro Manabe; Mayuko
- Studio: Tokai Television
- Original network: FNS (THK, Fuji TV)
- Original run: October 14, 2023 – December 23, 2023
- Episodes: 11
- icon

Seasoned Connections, also known as Atari no Kitchen! (Japanese: あたりのキッチン!, Hepburn: Atari no Kitchin!; lit. 'Atari's Kitchen!'), is a Japanese manga series written and illustrated by Yuki Shirono. It was serialized in Kodansha's seinen manga magazine Monthly Afternoon from November 2016 to September 2018, with its chapters collected in four tankōbon volumes. A television drama adaptation aired from October to December 2023.

== Plot ==
Kiyomi Atari is a university student who has severe social anxiety, but a strong sense of taste and smell. Wanting to make connections with people despite her lack of communication skills, she works part-time as a cook at the Aun (阿吽) diner, owned by Zenjirō Nakae and his son, Kiyomasa.

== Characters ==
Kiyomi Atari (辺 清美, Atari Kiyomi)
Portrayed by: Hiyori Sakurada
Zenjirō Nakae (中江 善次郎, Nakae Zenjirō)
Portrayed by: Atsuro Watabe
Kiyomasa Nakae (中江 清正, Nakae Kiyomasa)
Portrayed by: Airu Kubozuka
Sakura Suzushiro (鈴代 桜, Suzushiro Sakura)
Portrayed by: Mio Kudo
Haru Kusunoki (楠木 ハル, Kusunoki Haru)
Portrayed by: Rie Minemura
Akemi Atari (辺 明美, Atari Akemi)
Portrayed by: Sachie Hara

== Media ==
=== Manga ===
Written and illustrated by Yuki Shirono, Seasoned Connections was first published as a one-shot in the May 2016 issue of Kodansha's seinen manga magazine Monthly Afternoon, released on March 25, 2016. It was later serialized in Monthly Afternoon starting on November 25, 2016, and ending on September 25, 2018. Kodansha collected its chapters in four tankōbon volumes, released from April 21, 2017, to October 23, 2018.

==== Volumes ====
No.	Release date	ISBN
1	April 21, 2017	978-4-06-388253-7
0. "Mission: …Impossible?"; 1. "To Work or to Eat, That is the Question."; 2. "Don't Think. Eat!"; 3. "Red Hot Chili Pepper + α"; 4. "Take the Sour With the Sweet!"; 5. "Spring Has Come."
2	October 23, 2017	978-4-06-388298-8
6. "Chicken Or the Egg?"; 7. "Reel Him In!"; 8. "All Roads Lead to Napolitan."; 9. "Stand By You."; 10. "You Can't Always Remember What You Want."; 11. "Superstition Ain't the Way, But…"
3	April 23, 2018	978-4-06-511236-6
12. "Just Be Friends."; 13. "MOTHER"; 14. "No Fish Without Bones, No Man Without Flaws."; 15. "Bittersweet & Juicy"; 16. "FATHER"; 17. "The Hot Entertainer"
4	October 23, 2018	978-4-06-513211-1
18. "Without Haste, But Without Rest, Sometimes With Meat."; 19. "Lunchin' in the Rain"; 20. "2-3 Days of Summer"; 21. "Home Sweet Home"; 22. "How Yummy the Moon"; 23. "Make the Mission Possible!"

=== Drama ===
A television drama adaptation, starring Hiyori Sakurada, Airu Kubozuka, and Atsuro Watabe, aired on Tōkai Television Broadcasting and Fuji Television from October 14 to December 23, 2023, for a total of 11 episodes.
