= Io Sakisaka =

Japanese manga artist

- 咲坂伊緒
- Born: June 8 Tokyo, Japan
- Occupations: Manga artist; character designer
- Years active: 1999–present
- Employer: Shueisha (1999-present)
- Known for: Strobe Edge; Ao Haru Ride; Love Me, Love Me Not; Sakura, Saku

Io Sakisaka (Japanese: 咲坂伊緒, Hepburn: Sakisaka Io) is a Japanese manga artist and character designer. She debuted in 1999 with the short comic Sakura, Chiru and since has been known for her series Strobe Edge, Ao Haru Ride, and Love Me, Love Me Not.

== Works ==
=== Series ===
Year	Title	Magazine	Notes
2002–2003	Watashi no Koibito (私の恋人)	Bessatsu Margaret	—
2006	Blue	Bessatsu Margaret	—
2007–2010	Strobe Edge; Sutorobo Ejji (ストロボ・エッジ)	Bessatsu Margaret	
2011–2015	Ao Haru Ride; Aoharaido (アオハライド)	Bessatsu Margaret	
2015–2019	Love Me, Love Me Not; Omoi, Omoware, Furi, Furare (思い、思われ、ふり、ふられ)	Bessatsu Margaret	
2021–2023	Sakura, Saku; Sakura, Saku. (サクラ、サク。)	Bessatsu Margaret	
2024–present	Daydream Darling; Yume Ka Utsutsu Ka (ユメかウツツか)	Bessatsu Margaret	

=== Short stories ===
==== Anthologies ====
No.	Title	Japanese release date	Japanese ISBN
1	Call My Name	May 25, 2001	4-08-847378-7
1. Call My Name; 2. Shōmei no Yume wo Miteru (透明の夢をみてる); 3. Pink ni Naritai. (ピンクになりたい。); 4. "Suki" Nante Iwanai (「好き」なんて言わない); 5. Ai no Aru Fūkei (愛のある風景)
The anthology features all of Sakisaka's short stories in 2000.: Call My Name was serialized in the July 2000 issue of Deluxe Margaret.; Shōmei no Yume wo Miteru was serialized in the 2001 O-shōgatsu Zōkan issue of BetsuMa Special.; Pink ni Naritai was serialized in the 2000 Summer Zōkan issue of BetsuMa Special.; "Suki" Nante Iwanai was serialized in the November 2000 issue of Bessatsu Margaret.; Ai no Aru Fūkei was serialized in the March 2000 issue of Deluxe Margaret.
2	Bai-Bai, Ritoru (バイバイ、リトル。)	January 25, 2002	4-08-847468-6
1. Bye-Bye, Little (バイバイ、リトル。); 2. Koi to Baka to Watashi (恋と馬鹿と私); 3. Watashi no Mune wa Chirichiri to (私の胸はチリチリと); 4. Too Young
The anthology features all of Sakisaka's short stories in 2001.: Bye-Bye, Little was serialized in the May 2001 issue of Deluxe Margaret.; Koi to Baka to Watashi was serialized in the December 2001 issue of Bessatsu Margaret.; Watashi no Mune wa Chirichiri to was serialized in the November 2001 issue of Deluxe Margaret.; Too Young was serialized in the August 2001 issue of Bessatsu Margaret.
3	Kimi Bakkari no Sekai (君ばっかりの世界)	August 25, 2004	4-08-847778-2
1. Kimi Bakkari no Sekai (君ばっかりの世界); 2. Pika Pika Orange (ピカピカオレンジ); 3. Onnanoko. Otokonoko (女の子。男の子。); 4. Otokonoko. Onnanoko (男の子。女の子。)
The anthology features all of Sakisaka's short stories from 2003 to 2004.: Kimi Bakkari no Sekai was serialized in the May 2004 issue of Deluxe Margaret.; Pika Pika Orange was serialized in the January 2004 issue of Deluxe Margaret.; Onnanoko. Otokonoko was serialized in the June 2003 issue of Bessatsu Margaret.; Otokonoko. Onnanoko was serialized in the September 2003 issue of Deluxe Margaret.
4	Gate of Planet	December 22, 2005	4-08-846018-9
1. Gate of Planet; 2. Koi Shizuku (恋雫); 3. Ashita Miru Yume (明日みる夢); 4. Next World
The anthology features all of Sakisaka's short stories from 2004 to 2005.: Gate of Planet was serialized in the July 2004 issue of Bessatsu Margaret.; Koi Shizuku was serialized in the January 2005 issue of Deluxe Margaret.; Ashita Miru Yume was serialized in the July 2005 issue of Deluxe Margaret.; Next World was serialized in the March 2005 issue of Bessatsu Margaret.
5	Masukara Burūsu (マスカラブルース)	June 25, 2007	978-4-08-846184-7
1. Mascara Blues (マスカラ ブルース); 2. Romance no Rinkaku (ロマンスの輪郭); 3. Watashi ga Watashi de Aru Tame ni: Nagai Yume (私が私であるために—長い夢—)
The anthology features all of Sakisaka's short stories from 2005 to 2007.: Mascara Blues was serialized in the November 2005 issue of Deluxe Margaret.; Romance no Rinkaku was serialized in the January 2007 issue of Deluxe Margaret.; Watashi ga Watashi de Aru Tame ni: Nagai Yume was serialized in the November 2006 issue of Deluxe Margaret.
6	Sakisaka Io: Ren'ai Joshi Tanpenshū: Kimi Bakkari no Sekai (咲坂伊緒 恋愛女子短編集 君ばっかりの世界)	August 19, 2014	978-4-08-619508-9
1. Kimi Bakkari no Sekai; 2. Gate of Planet; 3. Koi Shizuku; 4. Ashita Miru Yume; 5. Pika Pika Orange; 6. Koi to Baka to Watashi
7	Sakisaka Io: Ren'ai Joshi Tanpenshū 2: Masukara Burūsu (咲坂伊緒 恋愛女子短編集II マスカラ ブルース)	February 18, 2016	978-4-08-619622-2
1. Mascara Blues; 2. Romance no Rinkaku; 3. Watashi ga Watashi de Aru Tame ni: Nagai Yume; 4. Next World; 5. Bye-Bye, Little.

==== Non-anthology stories ====
Year	Title	Magazine	Notes
1999	Sakura, Chiru (サクラ、チル)	Deluxe Margaret	Serialized in the November 1999 issue; debut work
2004	Oboreru Shonen (溺れる少年)	Bessatsu Margaret	Serialized in the October 2004 issue
2013	Sono Omokage o Shitteru (その面影を知ってる)	Bessatsu Margaret	Serialized in the July 2013 issue; published in volume 8 of Ao Haru Ride

=== Artbooks ===
No.	Title	Japanese release date	Japanese ISBN
1	Sakisaka Io Irasutorēshonzu: Aoharaido & Sutorobbo Ejji (咲坂伊緒イラストレーションズ アオハライド&ストロボ・エッジ)	May 25, 2015	978-4-08-792008-6
2	Omoi, Omoare, Furi, Furare Film & Illustrations (思い、思われ、ふり、ふられ フィルム&イラストレーションズ (愛蔵版コミックス))	July 22, 2020	978-4-08-792065-9

=== Design credits ===
Year	Title	Notes
2013	Hal	Character design
