= Takehiko Shinjō =

Japanese film director

- Occupation: Film director

Takehiko Shinjō (新城毅彦) is a Japanese film director.

== Filmography ==
=== Film ===
- Heavenly Forest (2006)
- I Give My First Love to You (2009)
- Paradise Kiss (2011)
- Kiyoku Yawaku (2013)
- Your Lie in April (2016)
- Daytime Shooting Star (2017)
- Kiss Me at the Stroke of Midnight (2019)
- And Yet, You Are So Sweet (2023)
- Yano-kun's Ordinary Days (2024)
- 366 Days (2025)
- Till We Meet Again on the Starry Hill (2026)

=== TV series ===
- Iguana Girl (1996)
- Minami-kun no Koibito (2004)
