= Wolf Girl and Black Prince =

Japanese manga series

- Cover of the first manga volume

オオカミ少女と黒王子 (Ōkami Shōjo to Kuro Ōji)
- Genre: Romantic comedy
- Manga
- Written by: Ayuko Hatta
- Published by: Shueisha
- English publisher: NA: Viz Media
- Magazine: Bessatsu Margaret
- Original run: October 25, 2011 – May 13, 2016
- Volumes: 16
- Anime television series
- Directed by: Ken'ichi Kasai
- Produced by: Shunsuke Nara; Hiroyuki Kiyōno; Yūji Kikukawa; Shūichi Kitada; Fumihiko Kimura; Akinori Omata
- Written by: Sawako Hirabayashi
- Music by: Go Sakabe
- Studio: TYO Animations
- Licensed by: AUS: Madman Entertainment; NA: Sentai Filmworks
- Original network: Tokyo MX, ytv, BS11, CTV
- Original run: October 5, 2014 – December 21, 2014
- Episodes: 12 + OVA
- Live-action film
- Directed by: Ryūichi Hiroki
- Produced by: Shinzō Matsuhashi; Tadaaki Kitajima
- Written by: Yukiko Manabe
- Music by: Hiroko Sebu
- Studio: Plus D
- Released: May 28, 2016
- Runtime: 116 minutes

Wolf Girl and Black Prince (オオカミ少女と黒王子, Ōkami Shōjo to Kuro Ōji) is a Japanese shōjo manga series written by Ayuko Hatta. It was adapted into a drama CD in 2013. In 2014, the May issue of Shueisha's Bessatsu Margaret magazine announced that an anime television had been green-lit. The anime aired from October 5 to December 21, 2014. Sentai Filmworks has licensed the series.

== Plot ==
Erika Shinohara is a high school student who desperately wants to fit in a clique so she would not become lonely. However, because her clique consists of girls who have boyfriends, she has to resort to tell lies about having one herself. To make them more authentic, Erika takes a photo of a random guy in the street. Unfortunately, the guy, Kyoya Sata, turns out to be the most popular boy from her school. Erika asks him to pretend to be her boyfriend, which he agrees to under one condition: that she become his "Wolf Girl" by acting like a pet to him.

To her dismay, Erika discovers that Kyoya is far more dark-hearted than the "princely" personality he feigns towards others; he frequently gives snarks, insults, and generally has a cynical view of the world. Despite this, Erika is slowly attracted and eventually falls in love with him. Kyoya in turn softens and finds out that he is attracted to her as well, something that is cemented when Erika quits being the Wolf Girl after a misunderstanding, which he responds by "promoting" her to become his actual girlfriend.

Erika and Kyoya go through their high school years as a couple while having to face many challenges, including love rivals for each other, misunderstandings, and jealousy. They also learn to understand and change for the benefit of each other. In the process, they befriend three people who form a part of a group: Erika's self-reliant best friend, Ayumi Sanda; Kyoya's hot-blooded best friend, Takeru Hibiya; and the flamboyant Nozomi Kamiya, who becomes their classmate during their second year. Near the end of the series, the couple also have to face the truth of a long-distance relationship when Erika has to move to Kyoto to attend a vocational school for glass making; the two ultimately decide on working it out somehow.

Seven years after graduation, the group have attained each of their preferred professions, with Erika herself becoming a glass maker. She has also married Kyoya, with whom she has a daughter, Yuina.

== Characters ==
Kyōya Sata (佐田 恭也, Sata Kyōya)
Voiced by: Takahiro Sakurai (anime and drama CD) Played by: Kento Yamazaki
The main male protagonist of the series. At the beginning, when Erika suggested her idea of faking lovers, Kyōya agrees to it with a "Prince Charming" attitude. However, shortly after, he blackmails, torments and makes her his "dog". Gradually, he starts to genuinely care for her and becomes jealous whenever she gets close to other guys. He also develops a protective attitude towards her. As the series continues, the story shifts focus from Erika to him, as he realizes his actual feelings for her and she is not there just to "pass time". He is actually more of tsundere hiding under the disguise of a sadist. Once Kyōya learns he could lose Erika to Yū, he goes after her during their date and confesses his feelings for her. Kyōya also has an older sister who more or less shares his sadistic tendencies, and a fun-loving, rather hare-brained mother.
Erika Shinohara (篠原 エリカ, Shinohara Erika)
Voiced by: Kanae Itō (anime and drama CD) Played by: Fumi Nikaido
The main female protagonist of the series. Erika often tells tall tales about her having a boyfriend and takes a photo of a random guy to show as proof. However, the guy turns out to be Kyoya Sata, who also goes to her school. After some pleading, he agrees to pretend to be her boyfriend under the condition she become his "pet dog." She eventually falls for him, despite his cruel attitude towards her and desperately tries to win his affection.
Ayumi Sanda (三田 亜由美, Sanda Ayumi)
Voiced by: Ai Kayano (anime and drama CD) Played by: Mugi Kadowaki
Known also as San-chan, Sanda is a short-haired girl and initially the only one of Erika's friends to know the "fake boyfriend" situation. She is the complete opposite of Erika, being mature, self-reliant, and quiet. She is also the classmate of Kyouya during their first year. Though Sanda had a short interest in Kyoya, she considers her friendship with Erika to be more important than her crush. Later into the series, she also becomes close to Takeru.
In the film adaptation, Sanda studies in a separate, all-girls, school from Erika, making her a stranger to Kyoya.
Takeru Hibiya (日比谷 健, Hibiya Takeru)
Voiced by: Yoshimasa Hosoya (anime and drama CD) Played by: Ryusei Yokohama
Kyōya's best friend from middle school who is inheriting his family's cafe business. He is a hot-blooded man with a simple and clear personality. He fully supports Erika and Kyoya's relationship, being relieved Kyoya is finally able to befriend someone other than himself. Later, Takeru becomes close to Sanda, which initially causes Nozomi's jealousy, as he thinks their and Erika and Kyoya's relationships will make him the only single in their group.
Marin Tachibana (立花 マリン, Tachibana Marin)
Voiced by: Mariya Ise (anime and drama CD) Played by: Tina Tamashiro
One of Erika's friends.
Aki Tezuka (手塚 愛姫, Tezuka Aki)
Voiced by: Mikako Komatsu (anime and drama CD) Played by: Elaiza Ikeda
One of Erika's friends. She is dating Hajime Mukai, who is several years older than her. Late to the series, Mukai makes plans to move to Italy, initially causing both him and Tezuka to decide to end the relationship after the summer ends. However, with Erika and Kyoya's encouragement, Tezuka decides to move with him after her high school graduation despite her parents' protests.
Nozomi Kamiya (神谷 望, Kamiya Nozomi)
Voiced by: Yoshitsugu Matsuoka (anime and drama CD) Played by: Nobuyuki Suzuki
Nozomi is a super flashy guy and belongs in the same year as Kyouya and Erika. Also, he is a sort of a playboy type. He can easily remember the names he just acquainted to, especially cute girls name. When he first sees Kyōya, Nozomi believes he is the same as himself, even when he learns Kyōya and Erika are dating. He tries to get him to come around to his way of thinking. It is no fun being held down by one girl. However, Kyōya refuses and says how pointless it is to have meaningless flings with various girls, causing Nozomi to give up. He also decided he should find someone special to him as Erika is to Kyōya. Since then, he becomes a part of their group and even briefly becomes worried he will become the "third wheel" after finding out Takeru and Ayumi are attracted to each other.
In the film adaptation, Nozomi's personality is combined with Yoshito Kimura, a minor character who wants to date Erika just so he can get his revenge at Kyoya. Because of this, he never befriends Erika nor becoming a part of her group.
Yū Kusakabe (日下部 憂, Kusakabe Yū)
Voiced by: Ayumu Murase (anime) Played by: Ryo Yoshizawa
An unconfident and shy outcast, deemed a "coward" by Kyōya. Erika becomes friends with him after discovering under his quiet exterior is also an earnest, kind-hearted person. He started to develop feelings for Erika, causing him to dislike the way Kyōya treats Erika. He and Erika go on a date and attempt to become romantically close, but she confesses she still likes Kyouya. He kindly accepts this and warns Kyouya not to hurt her again. Eventually, he dates Edano.
Yoshito Kimura (木村 良人, Kimura Yoshito)
Voiced by: Nobunaga Shimazaki (anime and drama CD)
A boy in Erika's grade. He tries to get Erika to fall in love with him to get revenge on Kyōya for "attracting" his girlfriend, which fails. He seldom makes appearances afterward, where he is revealed to have dated another girl.
In the film adaptation, though Kimura does not appear, his role is combined with Kamiya.
Atsuma Fujikawa (藤川 敦, Fujikawa Atsuma)
Atsuma, nicknamed "Atsu", is Marin's boyfriend. He is cheerful and pixie-like, surprising Erika when she first meets him, as she always thought of him as a "cool guy". Atsu accompanies Marin on a double date with Erika and Kyoya. When thugs bully him and Marin, he chickens out, which disappoints Marin and makes her consider breaking up with him. However, with Kyoya's advice, he stands up against the thugs despite being unprepared, impressing Marin and rejuvenating her love.
Kitamura (北村)
Voiced by: Shintarō Asanuma
Kitamura is Erika's bespectacled homeroom teacher from her second year until graduation. He is stern and dislikes the playfulness of Erika's group, though at the end of the series he gets permission for the class to hold a ball before graduation ceremony.
Reika Sata (佐田 怜香, Sata Reika)
Voiced by: Mai Nakahara Played by: Nanao
Reika is Kyōya older sister who lives with their mother, Hitomi, in Kobe after their parents' divorce, where she attends university. She has the same personality as Kyoya does: cynical, derisive, and pessimistic, and the two often go out their way to insult and snark at each other. Having becoming used to seeing girls fawn over her brother due to his handsome looks, she thinks Kyoya will never find a serious partner, initially making her dismissive of Erika. After seeing how close Kyoya had genuinely become towards Erika, Reika supports her and gets mad whenever Kyoya treats her badly.
Hitomi Sata (佐田 瞳, Sata Hitomi)
Voiced by: Aya Hisakawa
Hitomi is Kyoya and Reika's mother. After divorcing her husband, she moved to Kobe, but only took Reika with her. Since then, she has felt guilty for abandoning Kyoya, who is forced to live in a lonely environment as his father is constantly at work. Unlike her children, Hitomi is fun-loving and has a rather child-like personality, though she has a bad streak whenever she drinks alcohol.
Rena Fukami (深見 レナ, Fukami Rena)
Rena is Erika's maternal cousin. She is a senior middle school student during her first appearance. Kyoya tutors her for the high school entrance exam, something Rena is annoyed at since Kyoya always treats her like a child. When he saves her from a stuffy boyfriend, however, Rena falls in love with him and declares to Erika she will become her "official rival". Nevertheless, Kyoya's constant dismissal of her, combined with his refusal to leave Erika, causes Rena to drop her pursuit. She is later revealed to have successfully entered the same public school as Erika and Kyoya.
Yukari Kasai (河西 紫, Kasai Yukari)
Kasai is a classmate of Erika and Kyoya during their senior high school year. She volunteers for the position of female organizer for the field trip to Hokkaido and has to work together with Kyoya, who is picked as the male organizer. She is no-nonsense and serious about her choice, criticizing Erika when she wants her to give her position to her just so she can be with Kyoya. While she claims to have no interest in Kyoya, she views his relationship with Erika as rather dysfunctional and urges Kyoya to consider breaking up with her. She accepts his refusal to do so, however, and settles her differences with Erika amicably afterwards.
Kouichi Terasaki (寺崎 孝一, Terasaki Kōichi)
Terasaki is Erika's middle school friend and the only boy to have confessed to her before she met Kyoya. She nicknames him "Terapon" and he in turn calls her "Nikuman". Back then, Terasaki was rather portly, but since Erika's rejection he has worked out to become slimmer. Erika meets Terasaki again during her senior year while looking for a part-time job in a DVD rental, where he also works in. Despite being estranged for over three years, Terasaki still harbors feelings for Erika and stubbornly tells her to break up with Kyoya, whom he deems insensitive and to become his girlfriend instead. He is rather forceful in his flirtation towards her, such as deliberately kissing her when he catches her off-guard. When she once again rejects him, he hits her and is ready to do so again when she firmly states her loyalty to Kyoya. He is only restrained from doing so again by Kyoya, who beats him up and tells him to stay away from Erika. Before the couple leave, Terasaki wishes their relationship crumble so Erika will know her choice is wrong.
Erika's father (エリカの父, Erika no chichi) and mother (エリカの母, Erika no haha)
Erika's nuclear family consists of a father and mother. Erika's father is an ordinary office worker with a passion for yakuza films, while her mother is a homemaker with the same childish personality as Erika. While they are present in early chapters, they do not play significant roles until late in the series. Erika's father catches Kyoya leaving Erika's room late one evening, who had been looking after her since she was ill and had fallen asleep while doing so, causing Kyoya to make a quick embarrassed leave. After this, he and Erika's mother invite Kyoya for dinner so they can learn more about him. There, Erika's father, who becomes jealous of Kyoya stealing Erika away from him, goes into a tantrum while drinking alcohol and drives him to leave dinner early. Afterwards, however, he properly apologizes to Kyoya and accepts he is a good guy. Later, when Erika has made up her mind to study glass making, her mother briefly becomes infuriated as she thinks she is not serious. After realizing she is serious about her career choice, she calms down and contacts her sister-in-law, Eiko, to take up Erika under her tutelage.
Hajime Murai (村井 肇, Murai Hajime)
Murai is Tezuka's adult boyfriend. He often lends his car to take Tezuka and her friends home after school, but is unseen until late to the series, where he goes with Tezuka, Marin, Erika, and Kyoya to a camping trip of their senior year. Tezuka reveals she is going to break up with Murai because he is about to relocate to Italy, a choice the two have settled with. However, when Erika and Kyoya advise them not to suddenly part ways, Tezuka decides to follow Murai after graduation.
Eiko
Eiko is Erika's paternal aunt who lives in Kyoto with her husband, Shinichi, and young son, Kei. She works as a glassware maker and once sent a glass as a gift for Erika's family. Erika visits her sometime after the Bon Festival of her third year to see a display she puts up for the festival. Eiko introduces Erika to the world of glass making, which she quickly develops a passion for it. Erika later determines glass making as her focus after graduation and is offered to study in Kyoto's vocational school while simultaneously learning under and helping Eiko with her business.

== Media ==
=== Manga ===
Written and illustrated by Ayuko Hatta, Wolf Girl and Black Prince was serialized in Shueisha's Bessatsu Margaret magazine from October 25, 2011, to May 13, 2016. The series' chapters were collected in sixteen tankōbon volumes.

At New York Comic Con 2022, Viz Media announced that they licensed the series for English publication.

No.	Original release date	Original ISBN	English release date	English ISBN
1	October 25, 2011	978-4-08-846715-3	May 9, 2023	978-1-9747-3752-9
2	January 25, 2012	978-4-08-846742-9	July 11, 2023	978-1-9747-3753-6
3	April 25, 2012	978-4-08-846768-9	September 12, 2023	978-1-9747-4051-2
4	August 24, 2012	978-4-08-846819-8	November 14, 2023	978-1-9747-4133-5
5	December 25, 2012	978-4-08-846870-9	January 2, 2024	978-1-9747-4299-8
6	May 25, 2013	978-4-08-845046-9	March 5, 2024	978-1-9747-4330-8
7	September 25, 2013	978-4-08-845101-5	May 7, 2024	978-1-9747-4570-8
8	December 25, 2013	978-4-08-845145-9	July 2, 2024	978-1-9747-4619-4
9	April 11, 2014	978-4-08-845190-9	September 3, 2024	978-1-9747-4890-7
10	September 25, 2014	978-4-08-845266-1	November 5, 2024	978-1-9747-4937-9
11	November 25, 2014	978-4-08-845301-9	January 7, 2025	978-1-9747-5174-7
12	April 24, 2015	978-4-08-845381-1	March 4, 2025	978-1-9747-5223-2
13	August 25, 2015	978-4-08-845431-3	May 6, 2025	978-1-9747-5569-1
14	November 1, 2015	978-4-08-845483-2	July 1, 2025	978-1-9747-5535-6
15	April 25, 2016	978-4-08-845540-2	September 2, 2025	978-1-9747-5825-8
16	May 25, 2016	978-4-08-845577-8	December 2, 2025	978-1-9747-5826-5

=== Anime ===
An anime television series adaptation aired in Japan between October 5, 2014, and December 21, 2014. Produced by Shueisha, Yomiuri Telecasting Corporation, VAP, TYO Animations and Yomiuri-TV Enterprise, the series is directed by Ken'ichi Kasai, with Sawako Hirabayashi handling series composition, Maki Fujioka designing the characters and Gō Sakabe composing the music. The opening theme is "LOVE GOOD TIME" by SpecialThanks and the ending theme is "Wolf Heart" (オオカミハート) by Oresama. It ran for 12 episodes.

Crunchyroll streamed the series, while Sentai Filmworks has licensed the series. After the acquisition of Crunchyroll by Sony Pictures Television, Wolf Girl and Black Prince, among several Sentai Filmworks titles, was dropped from the Crunchyroll streaming service on March 31, 2022.

No.	Title	Directed by	Written by	Original air date
1	"Caught in Her Own Trap -Liar-"; Transliteration: "Jijō jibaku -Liar-" (Japanese: 自縄自縛 -Liar-)	Daisuke Tsukushi	Sawako Hirabayashi	October 5, 2014
Shinohara Erika tries to fit in at her new high school. She finds that her new friends; Marin and Tezuka only want to talk about their boyfriends, so Erika follows suit and makes one up. Her new friends start to believe she's lying about it, so Erika takes a picture of a good looking guy to convince her friends that she has one. It just happens that the boy she took the picture of was none other than Sata Kyouya, the prince of class 8. Erika tries to convince Kyouya to be her pretend boyfriend. He accepts with one condition: she must be his pet.
2	"A Rash and Blind Act -First love-" Transliteration: "Keikyo mōdō -First love-" (Japanese: 軽挙妄動 -First love-)	Taiji Kawanishi	Junko Kōmura	October 12, 2014
Had enough with Kyouya's frequent orders, Erika thinks about finding love and going out with someone for real. She finds herself being bullied by the back of a school building by some of Kyouya's fans. Just as it starts to get violent, Kimura, a kind boy, stops the girls from hurting Erika. After being bullied again, Kimura asks Erika to go out on the weekend while he cleans her wound in the nurse's office. Erika and Kimura meet on the weekend, but it turns out he only wanted to go out with her because she's Kyouya's girlfriend.
3	"A Precipitous Drop -Fall in-" Transliteration: "Kyūten chokka -Fall in-" (Japanese: 急転直下 -Fall in-)	Kenichirō Komaya	Sawako Hirabayashi	October 19, 2014
Erika is depressed because she hasn't heard from Kyouya during summer break. The next day she learns from her friend Ayumi that Kyouya had caught a cold and has been at home the whole time. Concerned about his cold Erika visits his apartment to deliver handouts where she finds out that he's the only one home. Kyouya at first rejects her attempts to take care of him, but relents after realizing that she really wants to care for him. During the time she spends taking care of him, Erika begins to admit that she has feelings for Kyouya and decides to confess but is having difficulty expressing them. One day when she goes to Kyouya's house to deliver some apple-pears she sees a woman come out of his door which pushes her to confess to him. After hearing her confession Kyouya is surprised but then brushes it off telling her that she's only imagining her love due to their situation. The rejection leaves Erika hurt where she shoves the apple-pears at him and runs off in tears.
4	"Daily Anguish -Love attack-" Transliteration: "Hibi monmon -Love attack-" (Japanese: 日々悶々-Love attack-)	Shin Katagai	Sawako Hirabayashi	October 26, 2014
The woman leaving Kyouya's apartment reveals to Erika that Kyouya actually told her to leave saying he doesn't want to fool around with girls anymore because he got a new dog. When Erika reaffirms her love for Kyouya and asks if he likes her, he tells her to anguish over whether or not he does. Erika meets Kyouya's friend, Hibiya Takeru, and he decides to help Erika win over Kyouya by quizzing Kyouya about his preferences and having Erika enact them. When their plans fail, Takeru calls out Kyouya and Erika and confesses his love to Erika to make Kyouya take action. Kyouya is apathetic and Erika runs away crying. Kyouya then tells Takeru that he should stop scheming with Erika because he plans to fall in love with Erika in his own way.
5	"An Impregnable Defense -Christmas eve-" Transliteration: "Nankō furaku -Christmas eve-" (Japanese: 難攻不落 -Christmas eve-)	Shigeru Kimiya	Ayumi Sekine	November 2, 2014
It is Christmas break and Erika's classmates, Marin Tachibana and Aki Tezuka make a promise with her to share selfies of how they spent Christmas with their boyfriends. Erika tells Kyouya that they have to take a selfie as proof. Kyouya complies, however grudgingly so. Erika learns of Kyouya's dislike about Christmas and stresses out so much that she gets a stomachache. Kyouya takes her to the nearest restaurant before going to the pharmacy for stomach medication. When Kyouya "confesses" his feeling to her, Erika becomes ecstatic. However, Kyouya crushes those feelings by asking her how long he has to keep up this monkey business. Erika throws water at him and storms out. Kyouya sits in shock. When Christmas rolls around, Erika is still depressed and saddened over Kyouya. Kyouya makes a surprise visit and gives her a "dog collar", a pretty golden heart necklace pendant. They take new selfies.
6	"Preparing for Battle -Valentine day-" Transliteration: "Rinsen taisei -Valentine day-" (Japanese: 臨戦態勢 -Valentine day-)	Yoshitaka Fujimoto	Junko Kōmura	November 9, 2014
Erika laments the fact that after Christmas Eve, she and Kyouya did not spend any time together. At school, she sees him and when he teases her about being lonely she says it doesn't bother her because the necklace he gave her is proof of his love, but Kyouya tells her he can "throw her away" at any point. For Valentine's Day Erika makes Kyouya coffee-flavored cupcakes because he tells her that he hates sweet things. Erika gets to know her shy classmate, Kusakabe, when he forgets his wallet at the grocery store. She covers his bill and encourages him to be more confident. The next day she runs into Kusakabe again and when she finds out that his family gives him a hard time for not having a girlfriend, she gives him one of the cupcakes she made for Kyouya. Kyouya finds out and refuses to receive any of her cupcakes. Later Kusakabe confronts Kyouya about being a cruel boyfriend. Kyouya declares that Erika doesn't mean anything to him and that he just uses her to waste time. At the end of the episode it is revealed that Erika is at the bottom of the stairs and she heard Kyouya's declaration.
7	"Mutual Love -White day-" Transliteration: "Rakka ryūsui -White day-" (Japanese: 落花流水 -White day-)	Sumito Sasaki	Sawako Hirabayashi	November 16, 2014
After hearing Kyouya say he didn't care about her at all, Erika ends her relationship with him and deepens her friendship with Kusakabe. After going on an outing with Kusakabe and her friend Ayumi Sanda, Kusakabe asks Erika on a real date on White Day. Erika agrees but she can't decide her true feelings towards him. At the end of the date, she realizes that Kusakabe is truly in love with her and she can't return his feelings, telling him that she is still in love with Kyouya. Kyouya appears and says he is taking Erika back. He grudgingly admits that he is in love with her in earnest and passionately kisses her.
8	"Self-contradiction -Spring storm-" Transliteration: "Niritsu haihan -Spring storm-" (Japanese: 二律背反 -Spring storm-)	Ryōta Miyazawa	Junko Kōmura	November 23, 2014
Kyouya and Erika go to view the cherry blossoms over spring break. Erika thought that finally going out with Kyouya for real would be paradise, but Kyouya hates it and he refuses to participate in any of the romantic activities she had planned. It seems like Kyouya will give no quarter, leaving Erika to admit defeat but at the end of the date Kyouya softens up and asks her to feed him some takoyaki. In the second half of the episode a new character named Nozomi Kamiya is introduced who is a stereotypical teenage playboy. Nozomi Kamiya sees the two and wonders why a good looking guy like Kyouya would date a boring normal girl like Erika. He mistakes Kyouya to be his type. He tries to flirt with Erika but then he learns that she's serious about Kyouya. He asks Kyouya why he's with Erika and says obscene things about her which makes Kyouya furious.
9	"Honeyed Words -Wake up-" Transliteration: "Shuren tekuda -Wake up-" (Japanese: 手練手管 -Wake up-)	Shin Katagai	Junko Kōmura	November 30, 2014
Kyouya and Erika are going on a two-day trip along with the rest of their class. Nozomi sees this as the perfect chance to "wake Kyouya up". During the orienteering event, Nozomi tries in vain to get Kyouya to become a playboy like himself. Kyouya tells Nozomi that there is hope for him still, because before he met Erika, he was just like Nozomi.
10	"Wasted Effort -Happy birthday-" Transliteration: "Tō bō-da-sei -Happy birthday-" (Japanese: 掉棒打星 -Happy birthday-)	Taiji Kawanishi	Ayumi Sekine	December 7, 2014
At school, Erika tells Kyouya that her birthday is coming up (June 23). He asks her what she wants. She wants love. Later that night Kyouya asks Nozomi and Takeru what love is, since it is such an abstract concept for him. He asks what he should get her. Nozomi says to compliment her outfit while Takeru says to take her out to a restaurant. However later the next day, Kyouya eavesdropped on Erika while she was talking to San. Erika wants Kyouya to say "i love you" to her. On her birthday, they go to a restaurant, watch a movie, window shop and later take a nighttime boat cruise. Throughout all of this Kyouya is trying to say "i love you" but every time becomes flustered and makes some excuse. At the end of their date, while a car passes by, Kyouya says "I love you". Erika says that this has been the best birthday ever.
11	"A Critical Situation -Judgement-"; Transliteration: "Isshoku sokuhatsu -Judgement-" (Japanese: 一触即発 -Judgement-)	Sumito Sasaki	Sawako Hirabayashi	December 14, 2014
Kyouya's older sister Reika, randomly drops into town surprising both Kyouya and Erika. She reveals herself to be just as much as a sadist as her brother, except she tortures Kyouya as well. After hearing that Erika was his serious girlfriend, Reika decides to test her since her brother has never showed any interest in romance. Offended on Kyouya's behalf when his sister insults him behind his back, Erika stands up for Kyouya and says he has truly changed, challenging Reika. Reika calls Kyouya to a building, where they hear Erika sick in the bathroom as the aftermath of a dessert eating contest. She finally accepts Erika and calls her family after seeing how worried Kyouya was about her.
12	"A Pressing Appeal -I love you-" Transliteration: "Ai oyobi-ya karasu -I love you-" (Japanese: 愛及屋烏 -I love you-)	Shin Katagai; Yūki Arie	Sawako Hirabayashi	December 21, 2014
Finally arriving at Kobe, Kyouya's mom is revealed to be a normal, doting middle-aged woman, much to Erika's relief. After spending some time with her at the dinner table, Erika finds out a little more about the kind of mom she is, as well as her closed relationship with Kyouya. While washing dishes afterwards, Kyouya's sister Reika reveals the details behind Kyouya's suspicion of love and his mother after she divorced his father, and believes herself to be the cause of why he is the way he is. That night, they try on yukatas in preparation for the summer festival they are attending. Before leaving the next day, Kyouya agrees to tag along after having a change of heart. During the festival, Reika reminisces of all the childhood memories that the various foods and attractions remind her of, with Erika trying to get Kyouya to participate in them, but to no avail. After a small argument in which she pretends to be mad at Kyouya, she walks off to call his mother to set up a plan to get them to meet, but is knocked down by the crowd with her necklace falling off and breaking in the process. After Kyouya and Reika frantically search for her, their mother comes and assists them, finding Erika by the dumpster looking for her necklace. As the fireworks go off, her mother finds the necklace and they all go home. At home, Kyouya and his mother reconcile before he returns to Tokyo with Erika. On the train, he finds Erika looking at childhood pictures and he comes to terms with his memory of the snowman.
OAD	"Jumping at Shadows -Happening kiss-" Transliteration: "Gishin anki -Happening kiss-" (Japanese: 疑心暗鬼 -Happening kiss-)	Shin Katagai	Ayumi Sekine	April 24, 2015
At school, Kyouya's birthday is coming. Erika enlists Ayumi's help to restrain Kyouya first so that Erika can decorate Kyouya's apartment for her birthday surprise, but she sees Kyouya fall and accidentally kisses Ayumi on the lips after Kyouya steps on a dog stick. As a result, Erika's behavior and feelings are getting weirder all the time. The next day, Ayumi explains to Erika that a kiss from Kyouya was not Ayumi's first kiss, much to Erika's relief, but Erika is jealous because she wants to get a kiss from Kyouya. Knowing that, Kyouya chases Erika after school and kisses her on the lips, making Erika happy.

=== Live-action film ===
A live-action film adaptation directed by Ryūichi Hiroki premiered in Japanese theaters on May 28, 2016. It grossed US$10,639,039 at Japan box office.

== Reception ==
The manga has sold over 2.4 million copies as of April 2014. The 7th volume reached the number four place on the Oricon weekly manga chart in the week of September 23–29, 2013, with 102,872 copies sold.
