= Ao Haru Ride =

Japanese manga series

- First tankōbon volume cover, featuring one of the main protagonists, Futaba Yoshioka

アオハライド (Aoharaido)
- Genre: Coming-of-age; Drama; Romance
- Manga
- Written by: Io Sakisaka
- Published by: Shueisha
- English publisher: NA: Viz Media
- Imprint: Margaret Comics
- Magazine: Bessatsu Margaret
- Original run: 13 January 2011 – 13 February 2015
- Volumes: 13
- Light novel
- Written by: Akiko Abe
- Illustrated by: Io Sakisaka
- Published by: Cobalt
- Imprint: Cobalt Series
- Original run: 27 December 2011 – 2 June 2015
- Volumes: 6
- Anime television series
- Directed by: Ai Yoshimura
- Written by: Tomoko Konparu
- Music by: Hiroaki Tsutsumi; Keiko Osaki; Shota Hashimoto
- Studio: Production I.G
- Licensed by: NA: Sentai Filmworks
- Original network: Tokyo MX, MBS, BS11, TUT, GyaO!
- Original run: 7 July 2014 – 22 September 2014
- Episodes: 12
- Original video animation
- Directed by: Ai Yoshimura
- Written by: Tomoko Konparu
- Music by: Hiroaki Tsutsumi; Keiko Osaki; Shota Hashimoto
- Studio: Production I.G
- Released: 25 August 2014 – 12 December 2014
- Runtime: 21 minutes
- Episodes: 2
- Live-action film
- Directed by: Takahiro Miki
- Written by: Tomoko Yoshida
- Music by: Yuki Hayashi
- Released: 13 December 2014
- Runtime: 122 minutes
- Television drama
- Original network: WOWOW
- Original run: September 22, 2023 – February 23, 2024
- Episodes: 14

Ao Haru Ride (Japanese: アオハライド, Hepburn: Aoharaido; also titled Blue Spring Ride internationally) is a Japanese manga series written and illustrated by Io Sakisaka. It began serialization in the February 2011 issue of Shueisha's Bessatsu Margaret and ended in February 2015.

Ao Haru Ride received several adaptations during its run. A novelization by Akiko Abe ran in Cobalt. In 2014, a limited edition drama CD adaptation was released to promote the then-upcoming anime television series by Production I.G, which aired in July 2014. A live-action film adaptation was later released in December 2014. A live-action television drama adaptation is set to premiere in Q4 2023.

Ao Haru Ride was critically acclaimed in Japan and was consistently named one of the best series of 2014 by several manga industry professionals. The series achieved popularity among readers who strongly identified with Futaba's personal growth. The series was also one of the best-selling manga in 2013 and 2014.

== Plot ==
Futaba Yoshioka is a 16-year-old high school student who attempts to fit in with her female friends by acting "unfeminine", due to a history of her female classmates ostracizing her out of jealousy. As a result, she feels her life is uninteresting. One day, she reunites with Kou Tanaka, her first love who had previously moved to Nagasaki in middle school. Kou, who now uses the surname "Mabuchi", has become a completely different person than she knew back then, as he is now cold and indifferent. When the new school year starts, Futaba decides to make a positive change for herself and volunteers to become the class representative. She is joined by Kou and her classmates, Yuri Makita, Shuko Murao, and Aya Kominato, who all form a bond together.

Futaba learns that Kou's mother had died after he moved away, and as she helps him with his grief, she falls in love with him again. However, just when Kou is about to move on from his past, Yui Narumi, his friend from Nagasaki, moves to his town, and he stays with her to help her through her father's death. When Futaba realizes she cannot change Kou, she decides to move on. When she begins a relationship with Toma Kikuchi, Kou realizes his relationship with Yui is holding him back and preventing him from accepting positive changes in his life. After he removes himself for good, he begins actively pursuing Futaba. Futaba's lingering feelings for him complicates her relationship with Toma, and they amicably break up.

During Christmas, Futaba agrees to meet Kou in the same place where they promised to meet years before until his transfer, but it is cut short when Kou is involved in a minor accident. At the hospital, Futaba and Kou admit to each other and declare they are in love. At the end of the series, the two, along with their friends, move on with their lives as they establish new relationships and accept new changes within each other. Kou changes his surname back to Tanaka, and Futaba believes that something interesting has finally started for her.

== Characters ==
Futaba Yoshioka (吉岡 双葉, Yoshioka Futaba)
Voiced by: Maaya Uchida (anime);
Portrayed by: Tsubasa Honda (film), Natsuki Deguchi (TV drama)
Futaba was an outcast in middle school because the girls were jealous of her popularity with boys. Determined to have friends in high school, she forces herself to be unattractive as possible for her classmates' approval. After reuniting with Kou, she decides to be true to herself. Eventually, Futaba falls in love with Kou again and constantly worries that whether she is clinging to her past.
Kou Mabuchi (馬渕 洸, Mabuchi Kō)
Voiced by: Yuki Kaji (anime);
Portrayed by: Masahiro Higashide (film), Kaito Sakurai (TV drama)
Kou attended the same middle school as Futaba, where he later moved to Nagasaki and changed his name from Kou Tanaka (田中 洸, Tanaka Kō). After reappearing at Futaba's high school, he has become more pessimistic after his mother's death, and later distances himself from Futaba to take care of Narumi, a childhood friend that manipulated him through mutual trauma. As Kou becomes more honest with others including himself, he finally realizes that he deserves to be happy, doesn't need to hide his feelings anymore and decides to finally pursue Futaba. He and Futaba later on reconcile and start dating. In the last chapter, he changed his family name back to Tanaka.
Yuri Makita (槙田 悠里, Makita Yūri)
Voiced by: Ai Kayano (anime);
Portrayed by: Izumi Fujimoto (film) Riko (TV drama)
Yuri is Futaba's classmate who is ostracized by the girls in class, who feel threatened by her popularity with the boys. However, unlike Futaba, Yuri doesn't hide who she truly is, and the two eventually become best friends. Yuri falls in love with Kou after he helps her during a class leader's camp, but she greatly treasures her friendship with Futaba, causing her to be conflicted. After Kou rejects her, she later begins dating Uchiyama, one of Toma's friends.
Shuko Murao (村尾 修子, Murao Shūko)
Voiced by: Mikako Komatsu (anime);
Portrayed by Yua Shinkawa (film) Sara Shida (TV drama)
Shuko is an unfriendly girl who prefers not to have friends. She is also in love with Mr. Tanaka and joins the class committee because of him, but over time, she befriends Futaba and Yuri as well. Near the end of the series, she accepts Kominato's feelings and they begin dating.
Aya Kominato (小湊 亜耶, Kominato Aya)
Voiced by: KENN (anime),
Portrayed by: Ryo Yoshizawa (film) Taisuke Niihara (TV drama)
Kominato is an outgoing boy who befriends Kou. He is love with Shuko since their first year in school, and dislikes Mr. Tanaka as the rival in love.
Yōichi Tanaka (田中 陽一, Tanaka Yōichi)
Voiced by: Daisuke Hirakawa (anime);
Portrayed by Yū Koyanagi (film) Daiki Kanechika (TV drama)
Mr. Tanaka is Kou's older brother by eight years and an English teacher. Unlike Kou, he behaves childishly. His family name is different from Kou's due to their parents divorce, and he tries to look over Kou, much to the latter's reluctance. Mr. Tanaka is aware of Shuko's feelings for him, but he constantly rejects her advances due to his position as her teacher.
Tōma Kikuchi (菊池 冬馬, Kikuchi Tōma)
Voiced by: Yoshitsugu Matsuoka (anime); Yudai Chiba (film)
Toma is a boy in Futaba's class year, who initially has a bad impression from her accidentally groping him. However, he eventually softens up to her. He falls for Futaba's good nature and constantly gives her advice.
Yui Narumi (成海 唯, Narumi Yui)
Portrayed by: Mitsuki Takahata (film)
Yui is a classmate of Kou's from junior high in Nagasaki. Her father was in the same hospital as Kou's mother. Yui's father has recently died causing Kou to keep in touch with her more frequently.

== Development ==
Sakisaka wanted to draw a story about them growing up, and for Ao Haru Ride, she wanted to focus on the characters' self-journey and discovering who they truly were. Futaba and Kou's accidental kiss was based on a real-life experience Sakisaka had in the past such a cute life-momment.

The title consisted of individual readings for the characters used for the word "youth" (青春, seishun), which were "blue" (青, ao) and "spring" (春, haru). The phrase was then followed by the word "ride" because Sakisaka envisioned the image of "riding on youth." Sakisaka had decided to have the title read "Aoharide" instead of "Ao Haru Ride" because the sounds flowed better. The logo was designed by Yasuhisa Kawatani. The bottom of the original Japanese logo contained the English text, "The scent of air after the rain. I heard your pulse. I saw the light." Kawatani drew inspiration from the song "I Saw the Light" by Todd Rundgren while designing the logo. In Viz Media's English translation, the subtitle was reworded into, "The scent of air after the rain... In the light around us, I felt your heartbeat."

=== Characters ===
Out of all the characters, Sakisaka felt that Shuko was the most "manga-like." She also wrote Yui as a contrast to Futaba's personality, where Yui is able to be honest about her thoughts. Speculations of Sakisaka basing Toma's image on South Korean singer Taemin became a trending topic in South Korea, especially as Sakisaka was a fan of his; she responded by denying Toma had a specific model.

== Media ==
=== Manga ===
Ao Haru Ride is written and illustrated by Io Sakisaka. The series' prologue, "Unwritten", was released as a booklet in the February 2011 issue of Bessatsu Margaret released in January 2011. The series was officially serialized beginning from the March 2011 issue released in February 2011, until the March 2015 issue released on 13 February 2015. The chapters were later released in 13 bound volumes by Shueisha under the Margaret Comics imprint.

Shuko's side story, "Ao Haru Ride: The Affinity of the Stars", was serialized in the September 2011 issue of Bessatsu Margaret Sister, and was later compiled in volume 4. "Sono Omokage o Shitteru", Sakisaka's first original short story in six years, was serialized in the July 2013 issue of Bessatsu Margaret and later compiled into volume 8. A drama CD was bundled with the limited edition of volume 10 to promote the anime's then-upcoming release, starring the anime cast and featuring an original scenario written by Sakisaka. The limited editions of volume 11 and 12 were bundled with original anime DVDs containing unaired episodes of the anime series.

To celebrate the 50th anniversary of Margaret, Sakisaka collaborated with Kazune Kawahara and Aruko, the creators of My Love Story!!, to create a crossover comic called My Ride!!, which was released in the July 2013 issue of Bessatsu Margaret.

Viz Media announced during their Anime Boston 2018 panel that they were publishing the manga in English under the manga's original title, Ao Haru Ride. The manga has also been released in German (Tokyopop), French (Kana), Italian (Panini Comics), Chinese (Tong Li), and Polish (Waneko).

No.	Original release date	Original ISBN	English release date	English ISBN
1	13 April 2011	978-4-08-846647-7	2 October 2018	978-1-9747-0265-7
2	25 August 2011	978-4-08-846690-3	4 December 2018	978-1-9747-0266-4
3	22 December 2011	978-4-08-846731-3	5 February 2019	978-1-9747-0267-1
4	13 April 2012	978-4-08-846759-7	2 April 2019	978-1-9747-0267-1
5	24 August 2012	978-4-08-846818-1	4 June 2019	978-1-9747-0269-5
6	25 December 2012	978-4-08-846869-3	6 August 2019	978-1-9747-0270-1
7	25 April 2013	978-4-08-845028-5	1 October 2019	978-1-9747-0817-8
8	23 August 2013	978-4-08-845085-8	3 December 2019	978-1-9747-0818-5
9	10 January 2014	978-4-08-845151-0	4 February 2020	978-1-9747-0819-2
10	23 May 2014	978-4-08-845211-1 (regular edition); ISBN 978-4-08-908208-9 (limited edition with drama CD)	7 April 2020	978-1-9747-0820-8
11	25 August 2014	978-4-08-845256-2 (regular edition); ISBN 978-4-08-908214-0 (limited edition with OAD)	2 June 2020	978-1-9747-0821-5
12	12 December 2014	978-4-08-845314-9 (regular edition); ISBN 978-4-08-908235-5 (limited edition with OAD)	4 August 2020	978-1-9747-0822-2
13	5 May 2015	978-4-08-845389-7	6 October 2020	978-1-9747-0823-9

=== Novel ===
Ao Haru Ride received a novelization written by Akiko Abe and illustrated by Io Sakisaka, which ran in the magazine Cobalt. The chapters were later compiled by Shueisha and released under the Cobalt Bunko imprint.

No.	Japanese release date	Japanese ISBN
1	27 December 2011	978-4-08-601602-5
2	1 August 2012	978-4-08-601660-5
3	1 March 2013	978-4-08-601712-1
4	27 December 2013	978-4-08-601782-4
5	29 November 2014	978-4-08-601841-8
6	2 June 2015	978-4-08-601864-7

=== Anime ===
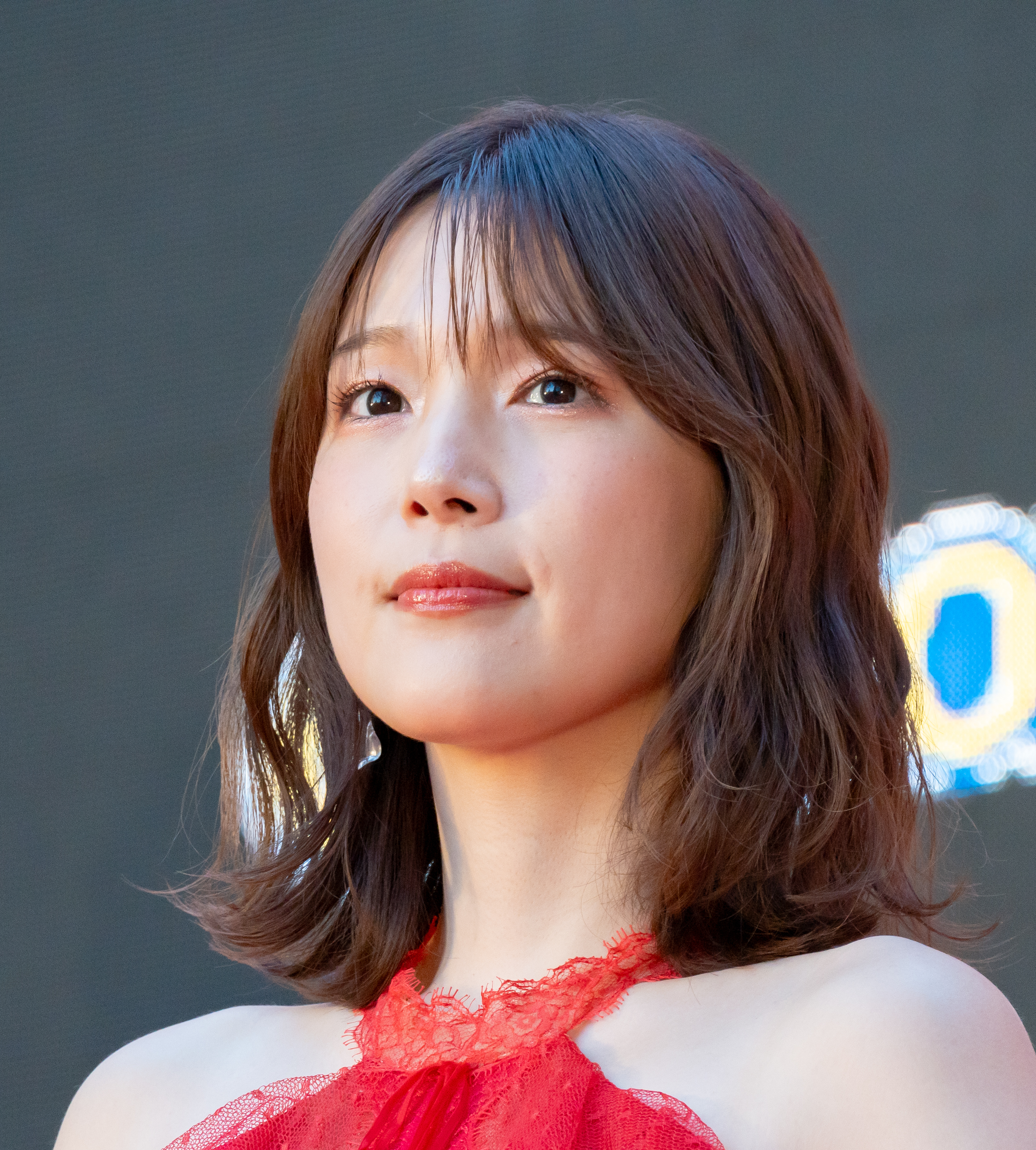
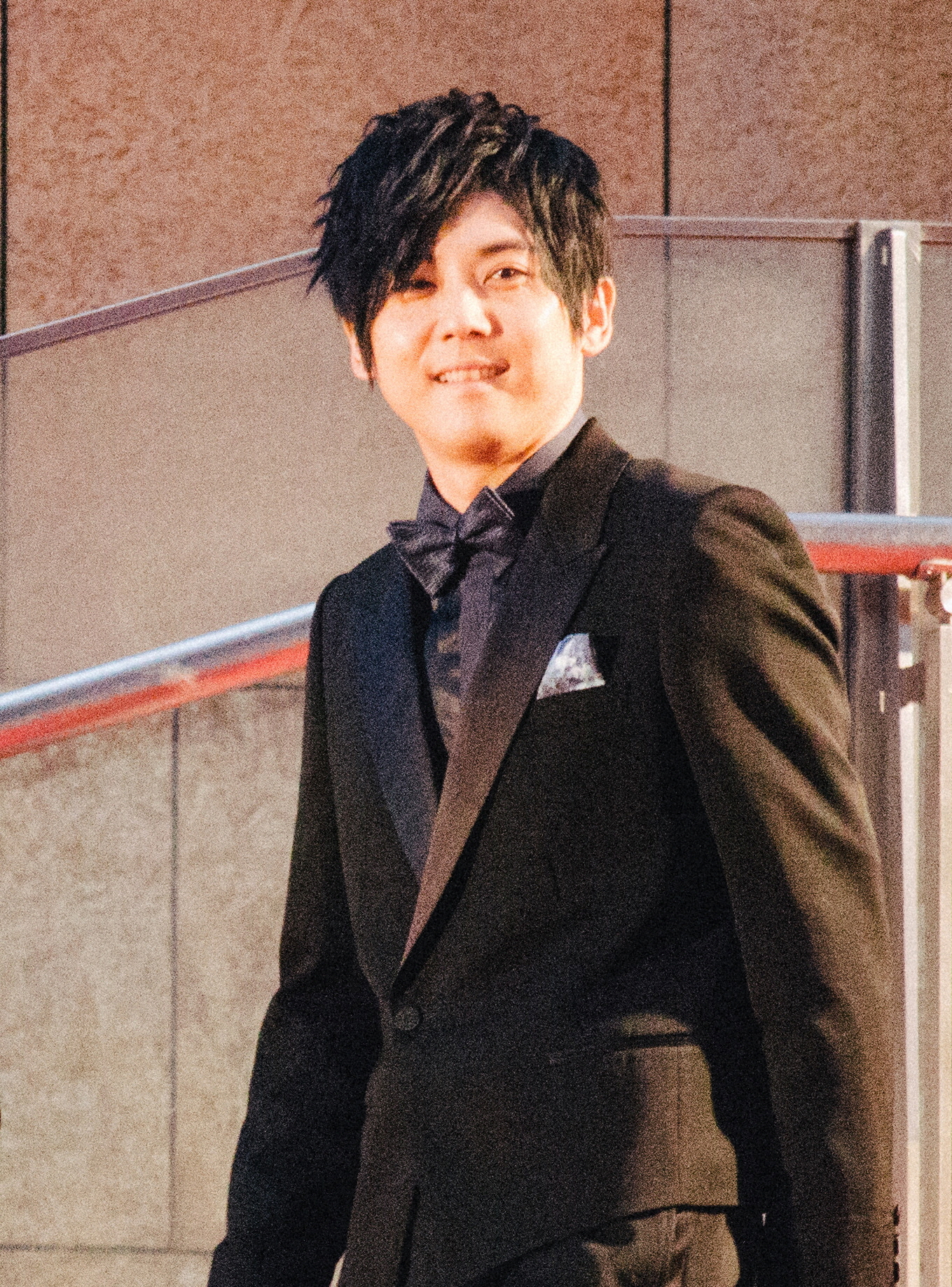
Maaya Uchida (left, 2023) and Yuki Kaji (right, 2014) voiced Futaba and Kou in the anime adaptation, respectively.

An anime television series adaptation was first announced in the February 2014 issue of Bessatsu Margaret. The series was produced by Production I.G and directed by Ai Yoshimura. A drama CD bundled with the limited edition of volume 10 starring the anime cast was released on 23 May 2014, to promote the anime, which featured an original scenario written by Sakisaka.

The anime series later premiered in Japan on 7 July 2014, with weekly broadcasts at 12 AM on Tokyo MX. The opening theme for the series is "Sekai wa Koi ni Ochiteiru", a collaboration song between Vocaloid producers CHiCO and HoneyWorks, while the ending theme is "Blue" by Fujifabric. In addition, the insert song "I Will" was performed by Chelsy. Episode 0 was released as an original anime DVD bundled with the limited edition of volume 11 of the manga. A second original anime DVD containing episode 14 was bundled with the limited edition of volume 12 of the manga. Sentai Filmworks licensed the series in English under the title Blue Spring Ride, and the series was streamed on Crunchyroll. Several exclusive comics drawn by Sakisaka were also released in the limited editions of the anime's home releases in Japan.

During the run of the series, Maaya Uchida and Yuki Kaji, the voice actors of Futaba and Kou, hosted a one-hour online radio show titled Aoharadio, which aired every two weeks for six sessions. The guests featured on the radio show included Mikako Komatsu, Shuko's voice actress, in the third session; Ai Kayano, Yuri's voice actress, in the fourth session; Daisuke Hirakawa, Mr. Tanaka's voice actor, in the fifth session, and KENN, Kominato's voice actor, in the sixth session. A CD compiling all sessions was released on 24 December 2014, with an unaired seventh session featuring Yoshitsugu Matsuoka, Toma's voice actor, as a guest.

The anime had an endorsement deal with cosmetics brand Ettusais, whose products appeared in the series, while in real-life, the items were released with limited edition themed packaging. The anime also had a tie-in promotional campaign with Lumine stores in Japan.

No.	Title	Original release date
0	"Page 0: Unwritten"	25 August 2014
In middle school, Futaba and Kou become attracted to each other. Kou invites her to the summer festival, but after their classmate questions their relationship, Futaba impulsively claims she hates all boys. Kou doesn't show up at the summer festival, and by the time summer vacation is over, Futaba finds out that he has moved to Nagasaki.
1	"Page 1"	7 July 2014
At the end of her first year of high school, Futaba reunites with Kou, but realizes that not only has he changed his last name, but he behaves differently than how he used to.
2	"Page 2"	14 July 2014
In fear of being ostracized by her friends Asumi and Chie, Futaba continues to be superficial, much to Kou's criticism. Futaba finds her classmate Yuri Makita to be pleasant but she is reluctant to be around her due to her friends' disapproval. After her friends continue to badmouth Yuri, Futaba finally defends her, but this ends their friendship.
3	"Page 3"	21 July 2014
Futaba is distraught after losing her friends, but at the same time, she begins to learn more about Kou after discovering Mr. Tanaka is his brother. As they enter their second year, Futaba finds out that Kou is now her classmate after dropping out from the advanced program, along with Yuri, Shuko, and Kominato. Determined to make a difference for herself, Futaba volunteers to be part of the class committee, with the other four joining as well.
4	"Page 4"	28 July 2014
As class representatives, Futaba and Kou must participate in the leader camp, along with Yuri, Shuko, and Kominato. However, the group is not getting along with each other.
5	"Page 5"	4 August 2014
During the orienteering activity at camp, the group gets lost. However, they cooperate to find a way back, and despite being the last group to return, their relationship is better.
6	"Page 6"	11 August 2014
After the camping trip, Yuri tells Futaba that she has fallen in love with Kou. Futaba becomes conflicted, as she cannot reconcile Yuri's interest with her own feelings for Kou.
7	"Page 7"	18 August 2014
Futaba comes to realize that she has fallen back in love with Kou. While contemplating her feelings, Futaba meets Yumi, an old friend from middle school, and through their encounter, she decides she must be honest in her friendship with Yuri and tell her how she feels about Kou.
8	"Page 8"	25 August 2014
Futaba finally is able to work up the courage to tell Yuri and Shuko how she feels about Kou; in turn, Shuko admits she is in love with their teacher, Mr. Tanaka. On the way home, Futaba encounters Kou and follows him downtown to see him meet up with a group of teenagers.
9	"Page 9"	1 September 2014
Futaba becomes worried about Kou after he tells her he has stopped caring about everything. As she tells Yuri about his words, Shuko tells them that Kou has failed his midterms. Worried about Kou's future, Futaba, along with Yuri, Shuko, and Kominato, invades Kou's home and prepares a study session so he will not fail finals as well.
10	"Page 10"	8 September 2014
Futaba realizes that there is tension between Yuri and Kou during the study session. When she asks Kou, he guides her to the room where he keeps an altar for his mother. Futaba begins crying and tells him that she wants "to know the Kou now". Kou's brother walks in while they appear to have a moment.
11	"Page 11"	15 September 2014
It is revealed that when Kou disappeared in middle school, it was because his parents divorced and he moved with his mother to Nagasaki. However, his mother was terminally ill, leaving Kou to feel helpless and alone. Futaba learns that Kou is suffering even now because he blames himself for being powerless. She wishes Kou had told her earlier and she wants to break open the door to his heart.
12	"Page 12"	22 September 2014
Kou opens up to Futaba about his grief and follows her advice to reconcile with his brother and father. The next day, final exam results are posted, with Kou scoring the highest of them all. Kou surprises his friends by suggesting to do another study group, and they begin making plans for summer vacation. Futaba reminisces about the past, but also looks forward to create more memories with Kou, Yuri, Shuko, and Kominato.
13	"Page 13"	12 December 2014
Futaba, Kou, Yuri, Shuko, and Kominato go to the summer festival together. During the event, Futaba runs into Toma, a boy she accidentally groped at school, and apologizes to him. Meanwhile, Yuri confesses to Kou and is rejected by him. At the end of the festival, Futaba and Kou go home together, and she feels that they are becoming closer.

=== Film ===
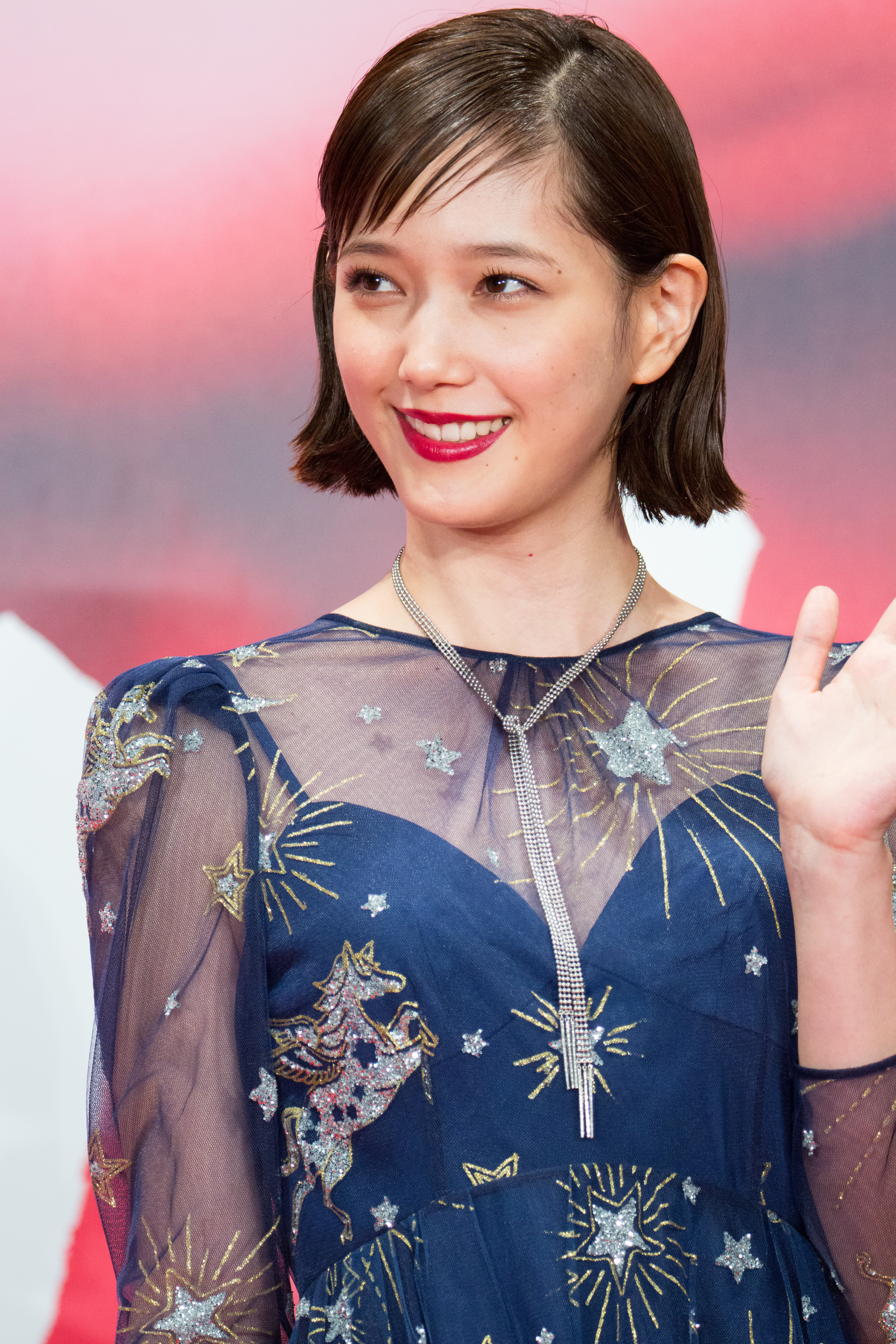
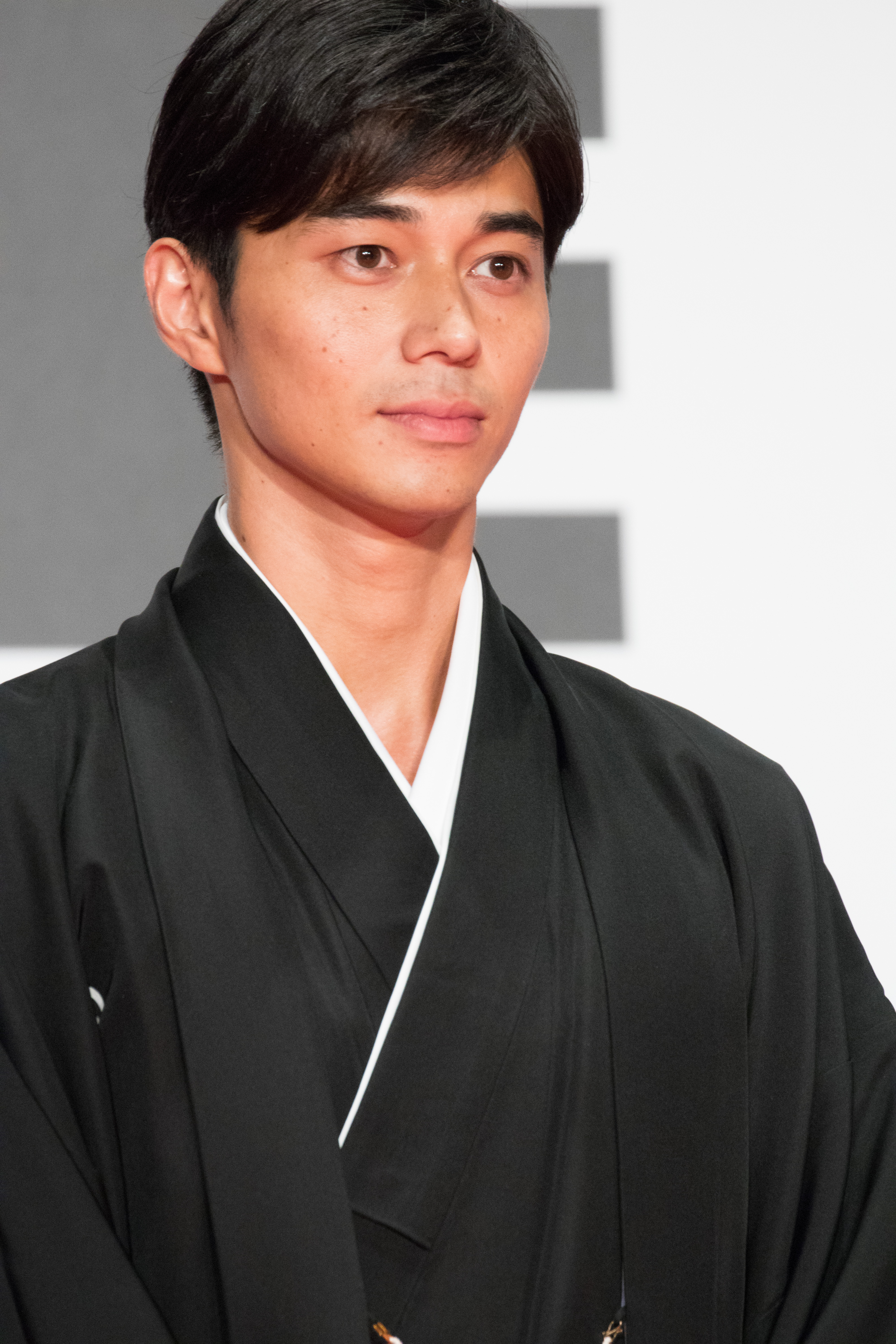
Tsubasa Honda (left, 2017) and Masahiro Higashide (right, 2016) starred in the film as Futaba and Kou, respectively.

A live action film directed by Takahiro Miki was released on 13 December 2014, starring Tsubasa Honda as Futaba Yoshioka and Masahiro Higashide as Kou Mabuchi. Additional cast members included Izumi Fujimoto as Yuri Makita, Yua Shinkawa as Shuko Murao, Ryō Yoshizawa as Aya Kominato, and Yū Koyanagi as Mr. Tanaka. Yudai Chiba and Mitsuki Takahata later joined the cast as Toma Kikuchi and Yui Narumi. The film was first announced in March 2014 through Bessatsu Margaret. To prepare for the role, Honda received hair extensions about 20 cm long in order to look more like Futaba. The film's theme song is "Kirari" by Ikimono-gakari. The film's soundtrack was released on 10 December 2014, featuring other artists including Rina Sumioka, Silent Siren, and Negoto.

The film opened at #1 at box office during its opening weekend, selling 210,000 tickets and earning ¥241 million. By the end of 2015, the film grossed ¥1.90 billion at the Japanese box office. In her review of the film, Yuri Horibe from Asahi Shimbun praised Higashide's performance, stating that she was "swayed" by his speech and actions just like Futaba, and felt that "Kirari", the theme song, highlighted the story's overall theme of "struggling with youth" and "moving forward." She also noted that while she had expected that the film would portray some of the manga's iconic scenes, such as Futaba sleeping on her desk and when Futaba and Kou hold hands through a window, she felt it was "not just a romance film" in regards to the second half, where the characters help Kou overcome his past trauma. On the other hand, Melanie Leung from South China Morning Post gave the film three out of five stars, claiming that the acting and Higashide weren't "charming", while praising the cinematography, the supporting characters, the film's conclusion, and the friendship theme.

=== Drama ===
In June 2023, a live-action television drama adaptation was announced. The series is directed by Masato Kimura and Yūsuke Matsuda. It is set to premiere on WOWOW in Q4 2023 and run for eight episodes, with a second season set for later., with Kaito Sakurai as Kou Mabuchi and Natsuki Deguchi as Futaba Yoshioka.

== Reception ==
Ao Haru Ride was a best-selling manga series in Japan, achieving popularity within teenagers and women between 20 and 30 years old, most of them who identified with Futaba's struggles. The magazine Da Vinci ranked Ao Haru Ride as one of the top 5 best female-oriented comics in 2013. The 2014 edition Kono Manga ga Sugoi! published a survey from 400 industry professionals, who listed Ao Haru Ride as one of the top 20 female-oriented manga of the year. Kono Manga ga Sugoi! also listed Ao Haru Ride as one of the top 10 manga series with the best kabedon when the trope was at the height of its popularity in 2014. Ao Haru Ride was also featured in a kabedon-themed Cup Noodle commercial, along with other manga series. The series was included in the 2019 list of Great Graphic Novels for Teens produced by American Library Association's Young Adult Library Services Association.

Since 2014, the manga sold over 5.84 million copies. Overall, Ao Haru Ride was the 21st best-selling manga in 2013. Volume 6 was the 31st top-selling volume during that year. In 2014, Ao Haru Ride was one of the most-printed comics of the year, with 660,000 copies printed.
