= And Yet, You Are So Sweet =

Japanese manga series

- First tankōbon volume cover

なのに、千輝くんが甘すぎる。 (Nanoni, Chigira-kun ga Amasugiru)
- Genre: Romance
- Manga
- Written by: Kujira Anan
- Published by: Kodansha
- English publisher: NA: Kodansha USA
- Magazine: Pink (May 24, 2017 – October 24, 2020); Dessert (December 23, 2020 – May 24, 2023); Palcy (January 10, 2024 – July 22, 2026)
- Original run: May 24, 2017 – July 22, 2026
- Volumes: 15
- Live-action film
- Directed by: Takehiko Shinjō
- Written by: Haruka Ōkita
- Music by: Fox Capture Plan
- Studio: Shochiku Studio
- Released: March 3, 2023
- Runtime: 137 minutes
- icon

And Yet, You Are So Sweet (Japanese: なのに、千輝くんが甘すぎる。, Hepburn: Nanoni, Chigira-kun ga Amasugiru; lit. 'However, Chigira is Too Sweet') is a Japanese manga series written and illustrated by Kujira Anan. It was first serialized in the supplementary edition of Kodansha's shōjo manga magazine Dessert, Pink, from May 2017 to October 2020, and later transferred to the main magazine where it ran from December 2020 to May 2023. It was later transferred to the Palcy digital manga service where it ran from January 2024 to July 2026. Its chapters were collected in 15 tankōbon volumes. A live-action film adaptation premiered in Japanese theaters in March 2023.

== Plot ==
Maaya Kisaragi, a 16-year-old student, confesses romantic feelings to a classmate but faces rejection and subsequent mockery on social media. When Chigira, the most popular male student in her year, overhears her distress over the incident, he approaches to comfort her, leading them to start a romantic relationship.

== Characters ==
Sui Chigira (千輝 慧, Chigira Sui)
Portrayed by: Kyōhei Takahashi, Hikaru Suenaga (young)
Sui is the ace of the track-and-field club and the most popular boy in school. He proposes to "play love" with Maaya.
Maaya Kisaragi (如月真綾, Kisaragi Māya)
Portrayed by: Mei Hata
Maaya is a book-loving high school girl who serves as a librarian alongside Sui. When she was depressed after her first ever confession is rejected, Sui suggests they fake date, leading them to eventually fall in love.
Sōma Tezuka (手塚颯馬, Tezuka Sōma)
Portrayed by: Rihito Itagaki
Sōma is a student who secretly has feelings for Maaya, whom he calls a "library hermit".
Chika Obara (小原知花, Obara Chika)
Portrayed by: Riko
Chika is Maaya's best friend who is a member of the track and field team.
Tarō Yamada (山田太郎, Yamada Tarō)
Portrayed by: Ryōsuke Sota
Tarō is a member of the gardening club who receives Maaya's first ever confession. He dismisses it as "impossible" and insults her on social media.
Fukumori (福森)
Fukumori is a student at another high school who asks Maaya for Tezuka's contact information.
Miyu Hanasaki (花咲美結, Hanasaki Miyu)
Portrayed by: Runa Nakajima
Popular girl who has an unrequited love for Chigira.
Hina (ヒナ)
Portrayed by: Yumena Yanai
High school girl who is a fan of Chigira.
Momo (モモ)
Portrayed by: Miu Suzuki
Momo is a high school girl who is a fan of Chigira.

== Media ==
=== Manga ===
Written and illustrated by Kujira Anan, And Yet, You Are So Sweet was first serialized in the Kodansha's supplementary edition of Dessert shōjo manga magazine, Pink, from May 24, 2017, to October 24, 2020. The manga was transferred to the main magazine, where it ran from December 23, 2020, to May 24, 2023. It was later transferred to the Palcy digital manga service, where it ran from January 10, 2024, to July 22, 2026. Kodansha has collected its chapters into individual tankōbon volumes. Fifteen volumes were released from January 12, 2018, to September 11, 2026.

In North America, the manga is licensed for English release by Kodansha USA.

==== Volumes ====
No.	Original release date	Original ISBN	English release date	English ISBN
1	January 12, 2018	978-4-06-510787-4	April 27, 2021	978-1-63699-059-0
2	July 12, 2019	978-4-06-516344-3	May 25, 2021	978-1-63699-110-8
3	March 13, 2020	978-4-06-518885-9	June 22, 2021	978-1-63699-164-1
4	December 11, 2020	978-4-06-521779-5	July 27, 2021	978-1-63699-246-4
5	June 11, 2021	978-4-06-523621-5	January 18, 2022	978-1-63699-567-0
6	December 13, 2021	978-4-06-526214-6	October 18, 2022	978-1-68491-496-8
7	June 13, 2022	978-4-06-528197-0	March 21, 2023	978-1-68491-851-5
8	January 13, 2023	978-4-06-530452-5	July 25, 2023	979-8-88-933050-9
9	August 10, 2023	978-4-06-532736-4	April 23, 2024	979-8-88-933446-0
10	June 13, 2024	978-4-06-535884-9	November 19, 2024	979-8-89-478163-1
11	November 13, 2024	978-4-06-537578-5	August 26, 2025	979-8-89-478661-2
12	May 13, 2025	978-4-06-539508-0	January 13, 2026	979-8-89-478838-8
13	October 10, 2025	978-4-06-541163-6	April 28, 2026	979-8-89-830069-2
14	March 13, 2026	978-4-06-542834-4	July 14, 2026	979-8-89-830169-9
15	September 11, 2026	978-4-06-544860-1	—	—

=== Live-action film ===
In August 2022, it was announced that the manga would receive a live-action film adaptation. It was directed by Takehiko Shinjō, with script by Haruka Ōkita, will star Mei Hata as Maaya Kisaragi and Kyōhei Takahashi of J-pop boy band Naniwa Danshi as Sui Chigira. The film was distributed by Shochiku and premiered on March 3, 2023.

== Reception ==
Anime News Network critic Rebecca Silverman praised its lighthearted tone, noting that while the protagonist's behavior occasionally verges on obsessive, the central romance evolves into a mutually affectionate relationship. She regarded the series as formulaic yet effectively charming. Fellow reviewer Lynzee Loveridge offered a more critical perspective, dismissing the premise as contrived and criticizing the heroine's unrealistic self-perception, arguing that the story depended too much on implausible character decisions. While noting the manga's reliance on conventional shōjo romance tropes, both critics considered it an undemanding, sweet story.
