= Sakura, Saku =

Japanese manga series

- First tankōbon volume cover

サクラ、サク。
- Genre: Romance
- Manga
- Written by: Io Sakisaka
- Published by: Shueisha
- English publisher: NA: Viz Media
- Imprint: Margaret Comics
- Magazine: Bessatsu Margaret
- Original run: February 13, 2021 – October 13, 2023
- Volumes: 9

Sakura, Saku (サクラ、サク。; lit. "Cherry Blossoms, Bloom") is a Japanese manga series written and illustrated by Io Sakisaka. It was serialized in Shueisha's Bessatsu Margaret magazine from February 2021 to October 2023.

== Plot ==
The series follows protagonist Saku Fujigaya during her first year of high school. Saku has pledged herself to being of help to others after being aided by a mysterious stranger, who only left a note signed by the name "Ryosuke Sakura". When she meets fellow student Haruki Sakura, she becomes determined to find out if he is connected to her unknown rescuer. The story continues to follow Saku's journey, as well as the lives of the students around her, as they go through high school life.

== Media ==
=== Manga ===
Written and illustrated by Io Sakisaka, Sakura, Saku began serialization in Shueisha's Bessatsu Margaret magazine on February 13, 2021. The series entered its climax on September 13, 2023, and ended the following month. Its chapters were compiled into nine tankōbon volumes from May 2021 to December 2023.

The series is licensed in North America by Viz Media, who began publishing it in English from November 2023.

==== Volume list ====
No.	Original release date	Original ISBN	English release date	English ISBN
1	May 5, 2021	978-4-08-844488-8	November 14, 2023	978-1-9747-3904-2
Prologue: "The Day I Found a Name"; Blooms 1–3
2	September 24, 2021	978-4-08-844531-1	February 13, 2024	978-1-9747-4308-7
Blooms 4–7
3	January 25, 2022	978-4-08-844577-9	May 14, 2024	978-1-9747-4567-8
Blooms 8–11
4	May 25, 2022	978-4-08-844610-3	August 13, 2024	978-1-9747-4634-7
Blooms 12–15
5	August 25, 2022	978-4-08-844692-9	November 12, 2024	978-1-9747-4935-5
Blooms 16–18; A Perfect Maiden
6	December 23, 2022	978-4-08-844705-6	February 11, 2025	978-1-9747-5195-2
Blooms 19–22
7	April 25, 2023	978-4-08-844740-7	May 13, 2025	978-1-9747-5485-4
Blooms 23–26
8	August 24, 2023	978-4-08-844795-7	August 12, 2025	978-1-9747-5554-7
Blooms 27–30
9	December 25, 2023	978-4-08-844850-3	November 11, 2025	978-1-9747-5901-9
Blooms 31–33; Extra Bloom

=== Other ===
In May 2022, singer-songwriter Miwa released the song "Bloom". The song was described as having been inspired directly by the manga itself. When asked about the writing process, Miwa commented: "When you fall in love with someone... your heart beats like a flower blooming, and you can't stop it. I put that feeling into the song." A special interview with Sakisaka and Miwa was released in Bessatsu Margaret (September 2022) to commemorate the collaboration.

== Reception ==
Reviews of the first volume were positive. Comics Beat gave it a score of four stars, complimenting the pacing of its "slow burn romance" and its "refreshing take on shōjo tropes". Josh Piedra of The OuterHaven, while critical of the initial characterization of the main cast, reviewed the story as being "done well, with an interesting twist".
