= Rainbow Days =

Japanese manga series

- First tankōbon volume cover

虹色デイズ (Nijiiro Deizu)
- Genre: Romantic comedy; Slice of life
- Manga
- Written by: Minami Mizuno
- Published by: Shueisha
- English publisher: NA: Viz Media
- Imprint: Margaret Comics
- Magazine: Bessatsu Margaret
- Original run: 13 December 2011 – 13 March 2017
- Volumes: 15 + 1 spin-off
- Anime television series
- Directed by: Tetsurō Amino (chief director); Tomohiko Ohkubo
- Written by: Aki Itami
- Music by: Hiroyuki Kozu
- Studio: Production Reed
- Licensed by: NA: Crunchyroll
- Original network: Tokyo MX, ytv, CTV, STV, BS11
- Original run: 10 January 2016 – 26 June 2016
- Episodes: 24
- Live-action film
- Rainbow Days

Rainbow Days (Japanese: 虹色デイズ, Hepburn: Nijiiro Deizu) is a Japanese manga series written and illustrated by Minami Mizuno. It was serialized in Shueisha's shōjo manga magazine Bessatsu Margaret from December 2011 to March 2017, with its chapters collected in sixteen tankōbon volumes. A drama CD was released with the seventh volume of the manga in October 2014. A 24-episode anime adaptation produced by Production Reed aired between January and June 2016. A live-action film was released in 2018.

== Plot ==
The manga follows four high school boys who are all friends. They do not belong to any club and just like to hang out with each other. Natsuki, the protagonist, is a hopeless romantic who has a crush on a girl named Anna who he met after his ex-girlfriend dumped him. He realizes he is in love with Anna and with the support of his three friends, he tries to show her how he feels in hopes of a relationship. However, he is faced with many obstacles.

== Characters ==
=== Main characters ===
Natsuki Hashiba (羽柴 夏樹, Hashiba Natsuki)
Voiced by: Yoshitsugu Matsuoka
Nicknamed Natcchan (なっちゃん), he is a hopeless romantic who immerses into his delusions of love. On Christmas, he was dumped by his girlfriend. While crying alone in the street, he saw a girl handing out tissues in a Santa Claus outfit. In return, he gave her a scarf that was to be for his girlfriend and immediately fell in love with her. The girl turned out to be one of his schoolmates from another class, Anna. He tends to get bullied and teased a lot by his friends, but they still care for him and support him in pursuing Anna. He once kissed Anna on an impulse while suffering from a very high fever but does not seem to remember doing so after recovering from the fever. Natsuki was a member of the tennis club in middle school and was quite good at it, but quit the club due to a problem related to his seniors. He later becomes Anna's boyfriend after confessing his feelings for her during the school festival and they attend the same university together after graduation.
Tomoya Matsunaga (松永 智也, Matsunaga Tomoya)
Voiced by: Takuya Eguchi
Nicknamed Mattsun (まっつん). He is a playboy who is popular with the ladies. Confident and a bit of a narcissist, he usually spats with Mari from time to time, until he realizes that he has feelings for her. Mari does not take him seriously the first few times he confessed to her, but his patience and understanding of her personal issues eventually won her over. Not one to shy away from grand gestures of love, Tomoya then becomes a doting boyfriend, much to Mari's embarrassment and distaste. He has a younger sister named Nozomi, whom he is very protective of. Tomoya is good at singing, has a knack for baking, and plays the guitar as a casual hobby. He later attends the same university as Natsuki, Keiichi and Anna. Much like his sister, it is hinted that he maybe a masochist.
Keiichi Katakura (片倉 恵一, Katakura Keiichi)
Voiced by: Nobunaga Shimazaki
Nicknamed Kei-chan (けいちゃん). While Keiichi appears as cheerful, he actually harbors sadistic fetishes. In fact, he constantly carries around a whip in case anyone provokes him. He also is very athletic, excelling in every sport. He likes basketball and tends to help out with the basketball team. His older brother, Yuji is a teacher at the school. He has an interest in older women and also once had a crush on the school nurse, Satomi. He confesses his feelings to her only to find out that she herself is also a sadist. He immediately gives up on her after that. He later falls in love and dates Tomoya's sister Nozomi, after she continued pursuing him even after discovering his sadistic side. After graduating from high school, he attends the same university as Natsuki, Tomoya and Anna.
Tsuyoshi Naoe (直江 剛, Naoe Tsuyoshi)
Voiced by: Kōki Uchiyama
Nicknamed Tsuyopon (つよぽん). He is an otaku and not one to read the atmosphere. He is usually seen reading manga or playing video games. He is the smart one of the group, usually getting high scores on exams and is good at English. He often tutors his friends . He also likes to create dōjinshi. He has a girlfriend, Yukiko, who likes to cosplay and they both have similar interests. He does not like to display affection in public, saving them for later when he is alone with his girlfriend. He later attends a university in Tokyo and continues a long distance relationship with his girlfriend.
Anna Kobayakawa (小早川 杏奈, Kobayakawa Anna)
Voiced by: Minami Tsuda (anime), Nao Fujita (VOMIC)
She is Natsuki's target of affection, who belongs in a different class. She is usually quiet and does things at her own pace. She falls in love with Natsuki after the Christmas incident but decides to stay shut about it for the time being. She excels in academics, usually ranking high in her school exams. She later becomes Natsuki's girlfriend after he confessed his feelings for her. After graduation she attends the same university as Natsuki, Tomoya and Keiichi, where she pursues law.
Mari Tsutsui (筒井 まり, Tsutsui Mari)
Voiced by: Yumi Uchiyama
Anna's classmate. She was loud, rude and grumpy to everyone, especially men. Her hatred for the opposite sex stemmed from elementary to middle school, where boys would childishly tease her (not realizing they were just crushing on her), and culminated when she found out that her beloved older brother was moving out to get married. Since then, she became distant and irritable, until she met Anna. As Anna's best friend, she is fiercely protective over her, which scares Natsuki a lot. She eventually comes to acknowledge Natsuki's feelings and entrusts Anna's happiness to him. Later on, she dates Tomoya, though they still tended to be comically at each other's throats due to her own social awkwardness.
Yukiko Asai (浅井 幸子, Asai Yukiko)
Voiced by: Shizuka Ishigami
Nicknamed Yukirin (ゆきりん). She is Tsuyoshi's girlfriend from a different school who shares the same hobbies and interests as him. An avid cosplayer, she has a penchant for giving nicknames to people who are close to her. Yukiko is a friendly and happy-go-lucky girl who supports everyone's love lives. Even though she attends a different school she always makes an attempt to visit Tsuyoshi as much as possible. Though her outgoing personality is the exact opposite of Tsuyoshi, they have a loving relationship where they both understand each other.
Nozomi Matsunaga (松永 希美, Matsunaga Nozomi)
Voiced by: Ai Kayano
Tomoya's younger sister, a well-mannered girl who develops an almost obsessive crush on Keiichi after he helped her at the beach where they first met. Though she can be a bit of a fangirl, her feeling are proven to be earnest, and this boldness of hers never fails to surprise and amuse Keiichi, who then challenges her to "capture his heart". She later attends the same high school and joins the volleyball club. She becomes Keiichi's girlfriend after the latter finally admits that she has captured his heart. It is also hinted that she may be a masochist, a side which was also brought on to her by Keiichi.

=== Other characters ===
Taizou Sanada (真田 泰蔵, Sanada Taizo)
Voiced by: Shinya Hamazoe
He is the captain of the basketball club and belongs to Class 1. He is good friends with Keiichi, since they both went to middle school together. He is able to dodge Keiichi's whip attacks because of this. Later on in the manga, he begins dating Chiba.
Wataru Mochizuki (望月 渉, Mochizuki Wataru)
Voiced by: Yū Hayashi
Wataru is the ace of the basketball club. He is Anna's classmate, and a rival to Natsuki as he also has feelings for Anna. He is usually polite. He confesses to Anna even though he knew that she had feelings for Natsuki. After being rejected by her, he later supports and encourages Natsuki to confess to Anna. He is very popular among the girls in his school and usually finds it hard to deal with this popularity.
Shinsuke Nezu (根津 慎之助, Nezu Shinsuke)
Voiced by: Yūsuke Ōta
He is also a member of the basketball club. He is short-tempered and passionate. He was born and raised in Hyōgo Prefecture and speaks in Kansai dialect. His nickname is Nezutchi. Tomoya calls him "Shin-chan", which irritates him to no end.
Chiba (千葉)
Voiced by: Megumi Toda
Natsuki's classmate and captain of volleyball club. She is an outspoken girl who later becomes Taizou's girlfriend.
Yuuji Katakura (片倉 優二, Katakura Yuji)
Voiced by: Shōta Ebina
Keiichi's older brother. He teaches Math at Shiritsu Seiryo High. By the students, he is usually called Katakura-sensei. Like Keiichi, he is also sadistic, even more than him.
Satomi-sensei (里見先生, Satomi-sensei)
The school nurse at Shiritsu Seiryo High. She becomes Keiichi's crush upon their first meeting and initially accepts his feelings until she tells him that she too is a sadist. She used to be a professional dominatrix.
Masaomi Tsutsui (筒井 昌臣, Tsutsui Masaomi)
Voiced by: Kappei Yamaguchi
Mari's older brother, he is friendly and easygoing. He was Mari's object of affection until he moved out to get married when she was in middle school. This, along with the relentless teasing from her male classmates and her female classmates' hostility toward her, turned Mari into a brash and irritable man-hater. Masaomi talks with Tomoya one day when he comes to visit Mari. Tomoya confesses his feelings to Masaomi, to which he wishes him luck with his sister.

== Media ==
=== Manga ===
Written and illustrated by Minami Mizuno, Rainbow Days was serialized in Shueisha's shōjo manga magazine Bessatsu Margaret from 13 December 2011 to 3 March 2017. Shueishha collected its chapters in fifteen tankōbon volumes, released from 25 May 2012 to 25 April 2017. A spin-off volume was released on 25 June 2018. A drama CD was bundled together with the seventh volume as a limited edition in October 2014.

In February 2022, Viz Media announced that they had licensed the series for English publication. In France, the first volume was published by Kazé Manga on 3 February 2016 and the second volume was released on 13 April 2016. In Indonesia, it was licensed by Elex Media Komputindo.

==== Volumes ====
| No. | Original release date | Original ISBN | English release date | English ISBN |
|---|---|---|---|---|
| 1 | 25 May 2012 | 978-4-08-846780-1 | 6 December 2022 | 978-1-9747-3470-2 |
| 2 | 22 November 2012 | 978-4-08-846862-4 | 7 February 2023 | 978-1-9747-3510-5 |
| 3 | 24 May 2013 | 978-4-08-845047-6 | 4 April 2023 | 978-1-9747-3511-2 |
| 4 | 25 September 2013 | 978-4-08-845102-2 | 6 June 2023 | 978-1-9747-3706-2 |
| 5 | 25 February 2014 | 978-4-08-845170-1 | 1 August 2023 | 978-1-9747-3779-6 |
| 6 | 25 June 2014 | 978-4-08-845230-2 | 3 October 2023 | 978-1-9747-4066-6 |
| 7 | 24 October 2014 | 978-4-08-845285-2 | 5 December 2023 | 978-1-9747-4111-3 |
| 8 | 23 January 2015 | 978-4-08-845333-0 | 6 February 2024 | 978-1-9747-4307-0 |
| 9 | 25 May 2015 | 978-4-08-845390-3 | 2 April 2024 | 978-1-9747-4345-2 |
| 10 | 25 September 2015 | 978-4-08-845447-4 | 4 June 2024 | 978-1-9747-4588-3 |
| 11 | 25 December 2015 | 978-4-08-845499-3 | 6 August 2024 | 978-1-9747-4633-0 |
| 12 | 25 April 2016 | 978-4-08-845555-6 | 1 October 2024 | 978-1-9747-4911-9 |
| 13 | 23 September 2016 | 978-4-08-845637-9 | 3 December 2024 | 978-1-9747-4956-0 |
| 14 | 22 December 2016 | 978-4-08-845683-6 | 4 February 2025 | 978-1-9747-5194-5 |
| 15 | 25 April 2017 | 978-4-08-845745-1 | 1 April 2025 | 978-1-9747-5234-8 |
| 16 | 25 June 2018 | 978-4-08-844055-2 | 3 June 2025 | 978-1-9747-5611-7 |

=== Anime ===
An anime television series adaptation was announced in the September 2015 issue of Bessatsu Margaret. Tetsuro Amino served as chief director with Tomohiko Ohkudo directing at the animation studio Production Reed. Aki Itami handled series composition. The voice cast from the drama CD reprised their roles for the anime. The series debuted on 10 January 2016 with each episode 14 minutes length. Sonar Pocket performed the series' opening theme song titled "Best Friend" (ベストフレンド, Besuto Furendo), while its ending theme, "Rainbow Days!", was performed by Yoshitsugu Matsuoka, Takuya Eguchi, Nobunaga Shimazaki, and Kouki Uchiyama, the voice actors for Natsuki Hashiba, Tomoya Matsunaga, Keiichi Katakura, and Tsuyoshi Naoe, respectively. The anime is listed with a total of 24 episodes in the six Blu-ray and DVD volumes.

=== Live-action film ===
A live-action film adaptation directed by Ken Iizuka and distributed by Shochiku was released in Japanese theaters on 6 July 2018. Rainbow Days opened at #3 on opening weekend and sold 87,000 tickets with a box office gross of ¥110 million. The film was also screened with English subtitles at the Japanese Film Festival 2018 in Australia.

== Reception ==
The manga has had over 3 million copies in print.

== See also ==
- Koi o Shiranai Bokutachi wa, another manga series by the same author
