= B.O.D.Y. (manga) =

Japanese manga series

- The first volume of B.O.D.Y., published by Viz Media on the May. 6, 2008
- Genre: Romance
- Manga
- Written by: Ao Mimori
- Published by: Shueisha
- English publisher: NA: Viz Media
- Magazine: Bessatsu Margaret
- Original run: October 13, 2003 – January 30, 2009
- Volumes: 15

B.O.D.Y. is a shōjo romance and drama manga written and illustrated by Ao Momori. It was serialized in Bessatsu Margaret from 2003 until its conclusion in the 2009 issue. The individual chapters were collected and published in 15 bound volumes by Shueisha, with the first volume released on April 23, 2004, and the final volume released on October 24, 2008.

The series is licensed for an English language release in North America by Viz Media. The manga is also licensed in France by Panini Comics. The series follows the romance that develops between 16-year-old Sakura Ryōko and her crush, Fuji Ryūnosuke, after she learns he works in a host club.

The manga has been well received in Japan, with the individual volumes regularly ranking on the Tohan charts. Reviews have been mixed about the series with commendation was given for the manga's art, while the plot clichés and character development were condemned.

== Plot ==
The narrative centers on 16-year-old Ryoko, who develops an attraction to her quiet classmate, Ryu. The plot develops when she learns he works at a host club, an establishment where male hosts are paid to socialize with female clients.

== Release ==
B.O.D.Y. is written and illustrated by Ao Momori. It was serialized in Bessatsu Margaret from 2003 until its conclusion in the November 2008 issue. The individual chapters were collected and published in 15 bound volumes by Shueisha, with the first volume released on April 23, 2004, and the final volume released on February 15, 2009.

The series is licensed for an English language release in North America by Viz Media. The manga is also licensed in France by Panini Comics.

=== Volume list ===
No.	Original release date	Original ISBN	North America release date	North America ISBN
1	April 23, 2004	978-4-08-847736-7	May 6, 2008	978-1-4215-1802-2
2	September 24, 2004	978-4-08-847783-1	August 5, 2008	978-1-4215-1803-9
3	January 25, 2005	978-4-08-847820-3	November 4, 2008	978-1-4215-1804-6
4	May 25, 2005	978-4-08-847859-3	February 3, 2009	978-1-4215-2359-0
5	September 22, 2005	978-4-08-847891-3	May 5, 2009	978-1-4215-2360-6
6	February 24, 2006	978-4-08-846033-8	August 4, 2009	978-1-4215-2361-3
7	June 23, 2006	978-4-08-846069-7	November 3, 2009	978-1-4215-2362-0
8	October 25, 2006	978-4-08-846107-6	February 2, 2010	978-1-4215-2790-1
9	February 23, 2007	978-4-08-846143-4	May 4, 2010	978-1-4215-2791-8
10	June 25, 2007	978-4-08-846182-3	August 3, 2010	978-1-4215-2792-5
11	October 25, 2007	978-4-08-846227-1	—	—
12	February 25, 2008	978-4-08-846266-0	—	—
13	June 25, 2008	978-4-08-846306-3	—	—
14	October 24, 2008	978-4-08-846345-2	—	—
15	February 25, 2009	978-4-08-846385-8	—	—

== Reception ==
The tenth volume of B.O.D.Y. was ranked 4th on the Tohan charts between June 26 and July 16, 2007. The eleventh volume of B.O.D.Y. was ranked 8th on the Tohan charts between October 30 and November 5, 2007. The twelfth volume of B.O.D.Y. was ranked 7th on the Tohan charts between February 26 and March 3, 2008. The thirteenth volume of B.O.D.Y. was ranked 9th on the Tohan charts between 24th and 30 June 2008 and 10th on the Tohan charts between the 1st and 7 July 2008. The fourteenth volume of B.O.D.Y. ranked 9th on the Tohan charts between October 28 and November 3.

About.com's Deb Aoki criticised the series for using "numerous plot clichés". Manga Life's Ysabet Reinhardt MacFarlane commends the second volume of the manga for its "attractive" artwork. A review of the third volume by MacFarlane comments that she is frustrated that "how often things revolve around misunderstandings that could be cleared up in about two minutes if the characters really sat and talked, or made a real attempt to figure how the other person might be feeling, but that's hardly unique to this series, or even to this genre (shōjo manga)." MacFarlane criticizes the fifth volume for being "one endless round of "oh, I can't possibly tell him the truth because OMG he'll hate me forever, so instead I'll complicate our lives immeasurably!" MacFarlane is "shocked and pleased" at Ryoko who hasn't "told a single lie in [the sixth volume]". She also commends the sixth volume where "Ryoko and Ryunosuke's relationship doesn't face a single major crisis." IGN's A.E. Sparrow criticises the manga for its artwork and making the characters look "more like Barbie and Ken dolls than actual characters". Mania.com's Erin Jones criticizes the manga's female protagonist for being "naive and stupid. In a later review, Jones criticizes the manga for its "predictable story and unremarkable art".

Jason Thompson's online appendix to Manga: The Complete Guide commends the manga, saying "Good pacing and believable writing elevate B.O.D.Y. above a conventional high-school shōjo manga premise; the story is played straight but never gets too dark, the characters are likeable, and the manga has many small surprises." Katherine Dacey from Pop Culture Shock criticizes manga artist Mimori for forgetting to "develop her characters into something more than stereotypes" stating "She also seems to forget about Ryunosuke's rather unsavory after school job—it's as if she began writing a juicy blackmail story and then suffered complete amnesia mid-script." Jennifer Dunbar from Pop Culture Shock criticizes the manga for its character design which "all look the same". Erin Finnegan from Pop Culture Shock comments on the overall story of the manga with "teenagers in hosts clubs to be unrealistic, but what's frightening about this volume is the inspired-by-real-life lectures the kids are given by the manager when they try to quit."

A later review from Finnegan states that the manga is a guilty pleasure stating "it's so terrible, but I'm compelled to read it because I'm fascinated by what crap the author will come up with next (it's like trying a new crappy Pringles flavor—gross, yet fascinating)." Active Anime's Rachel Bentham commends the female protagonist, stating "[Ryoko] switches her moods on a dime faster than a roller coaster! She is so funny! Her mood changes are like watching a game of ping pong!" Leroy Douresseaux from Comic Book Bin compares the manga to Sand Chronicles stating "the laughter, the tears, the fear, the squabbles, the arguments, etc.; it all feels real." In a review of the third volume, Douresseaux commends the manga's "clever character drama that focuses less on sex and more on the minefield that is romantic and interpersonal relationships." Douresseaux's review of the sixth volume commends the manga artist's "beautiful art" stating "is perfect for [the sixth volume]'s emphasis on love's labor won – the stubborn pursuit of someone playing hard to get." Douresseaux's review of the ninth volume further commends the art stating "Mimori has a knack for drawing faces; she emphasizes large, expressive eyes and hair that falls across those pretty faces in sexy strands or like drapery. Drawn at interesting angles, this is the perfect visual language for telling comic book stories of teen love." Lori Henderson from Comics Village heavily pans the manga stating "it's needlessly melodramatic, the characters are not interesting, and the situations are cliche."
