= Ayuko Hatta =

Japanese shōjo manga artist

Ayuko Hatta (Japanese: 八田 鲇子, Hepburn: Hatta Ayuko; born May 30 (year unknown) in Hyōgo Prefecture) is a Japanese shōjo manga artist best known for Wolf Girl and Black Prince.

== Wolf Girl and Black Prince ==
オオカミ少女と黒王子 (Ōkami shōjo to kuro ōji) is Hatta's main work. It was serialised from 2011 to 2016 in Bessatsu Margaret magazine by publisher Shūeisha and collected in 16 tankōbon volumes. The series is about 17-year old Erika who tells her friends the lie that she is dating her attractive classmate Kyōya. She asks him to play along and pretend to be her boyfriend. Kyōya agrees but seizes the opportunity to be mean to her and boss her around. Soon, however, they fall in love with each other and become a genuine couple. The manga was adapted as an audio drama, anime television series and live-action film directed by Ryūichi Hiroki. The manga has been published in France by Kurokawa and in Germany by Kazé.

== Bye-bye Liberty ==
ばいばいリバティー (Bai bai ribatī) spans four volumes, making it Hatta's second-longest work to date. From 2016 to 2017 it also appeared in Bessatsu Margaret first. Like Wolf Girl and Black Prince, the story is about a schoolgirl and her male schoolmate who can't stand each other at first but eventually fall in love with each other. This time it is the girl, Rina or Lina, who at first has no interest in romance in general and the boy next door, Takumi, in particular. To fend off a bothersome female suitor, Takumi pretends to be Rina's boyfriend and kisses her. However, for Rina, Takumi is nothing more than an unlikable womanizer. Only by and by her attitude towards him begins to change. Bye-bye Liberty has been released in French by Kurokawa and in German by Kazé.

== Ima Koi: Now I'm in Love ==
Ima Koi: Now I'm in Love (今、恋をしています, Ima, koi o shite imasu, literally "I am in love now") is Hatta's latest manga. Its serialisation in Bessatsu Margaret began in 2019 and 7 tankōbon volumes have been published so far. Once more, the story is about conflicted feelings between a schoolgirl and a schoolboy.

== Selected other manga ==
- 灰原くんはご機嫌ななめ, Haibara-kun wa gokigen naname, 2018–2019
- ぐるぐるめぐる, Guru guru meguru, 2010
- 悪い子の味方, Warui ko no mikata, 2009
- キミを中心に世界はまわる, Kimi o chūshin ni sekai wa mawaru, 2009
- ボクの世界 キミのリアル, Boku no sekai kimi no riaru, 2008
- ひよこロマンチカ, Hiyoko romanchika, 2007
- オーダーは僕でよろしいですか？, Ōdā wa boku de yoroshii desu ka?, 2007
