= Bessatsu Margaret =

Japanese manga magazine

- Cover of the March 2016 issue (featuring Love Me, Love Me Not by Io Sakisaka)
- Categories: Shōjo manga
- Frequency: Monthly
- Circulation: 30,000; (July–September 2026)
- Founded: 1964
- Company: Shueisha
- Country: Japan
- Based in: Tokyo
- Language: Japanese
- Website: betsuma.shueisha.co.jp

Bessatsu Margaret (Japanese: 別冊マーガレット, Hepburn: Bessatsu Māgaretto; lit. 'Margaret additional volume'), or Betsuma (別マ) for short, is a shōjo manga magazine published monthly in Japan by Shueisha since 1964. The stories featured in it are noted to have an emphasis on character development, focusing on themes of interpersonal relationships and settings of everyday life.

== About ==
Bessatsu Margaret was first launched in 1964 as a sister magazine to Margaret. It initially began as a quarterly one-shot publication, before moving to a monthly serialization in 1965.

In 1966, the magazine started the manga contest Shōjo Manga School – later renamed to Betsuma Manga School – where amateur artists could submit their own manuscripts to be discovered. At the time, this initiative was considered groundbreaking, and became the basis of the submission systems used among other manga magazines to this day.

In 1972, Bessatsu Margaret became the first monthly shōjo magazine to surpass 1 million copies in circulation. By 1983, the magazine had sold 1.9 million copies. In 2018, it had an average circulation of 131,000 copies. In 2019, the circulation dropped to an average of 95,000. Sales further declined to an average of 68,000 copies in 2020.

The magazine targets readers in junior high, high school, and university. In 2018, its demographic consisted of 12.7% of readers aged 14 or under, 16% of 15–18 year-old readers, 15.1% of 19–23 year-old readers, and 56.2% of readers 24 years or older.

In Takarajimasha's Kono Manga ga Sugoi! guidebook, the magazine was ranked 5th in the list for female readers in the 2012 edition, and 2nd in the same list for the 2014 edition. It ranked 16th among all manga magazine readers in the 2018 edition, and 18th in the 2019 edition.

== Serializations ==
=== Current ===
- Please Excuse My Younger Brothers (2020)
- A Star Brighter Than the Sun (2021)
- My First Love With You Again (2023)
- Gusts and Beats (2024)

=== Past ===
==== 1964–1979 ====
- Igano Kabamaru (1979–1981)

==== 1980–1989 ====
- Love Me, My Knight (1982–1984)
- Hot Road (1986–1987)

==== 1990–1999 ====
- Itazura na Kiss (1990–1999)
- Sensei! (1996–2003)
- Barairo no Ashita (1997–1999)
- The Devil Does Exist (1999–2002)

==== 2000–2009 ====
- Love Com (2001–2006)
- High School Debut (2003–2008)
- Crimson Hero (2003–2011)
- B.O.D.Y. (2003–2009)
- Five (2004–2011)
- Cat Street (2004–2007)
- Yasuko to Kenji (2005–2006)
- Kimi ni Todoke (2006–2017)
- Dreamin' Sun (2007–2011)
- Strobe Edge (2007–2010)
- Aozora Yell (2008–2015)
- Berry Dynamite (2009–2010)

==== 2010–2019 ====
- No Longer Heroine (2010–2013)
- Ao Haru Ride (2011–2015)
- My Love Story!! (2011–2016)
- Wolf Girl and Black Prince (2011–2016)
- Rainbow Days (2012–2017)
- Orange (2012–2013) (Note: Transferred to Futabasha's Monthly Action in 2013.)
- Honey So Sweet (2012–2015)
- ReRe Hello (2013–2016)
- Hal (2013)
- Sono Omokage o Shitteru (2013)
- Sensei Kunshu (2013–2017)
- Sora wo Kakeru Yodaka (2014–2015)
- Machida-kun no Sekai (2015–2018)
- Love Me, Love Me Not (2015–2019)
- Suteki na Kareshi (2016–2020)
- Koi o Shiranai Bokutachi wa (2017–2021)
- He's Mine! (2017–2019)
- Kimi ni Todoke: From Me To You: Soulmate (2018–2022)
- Tsuki no Oki ni Mesu Mama (2018–2024)
- My Special One (2019–2025)
- Cinderella Closet (2019–2022)
- My Love Mix-Up! (2019–2022)
- Ima Koi: Now I'm in Love (2019–2023)

==== 2020–2029 ====
- Sakura, Saku (2021–2023)
