= Hideki Saijo =

Japanese singer and television celebrity (1955- Now)

Hideki Saijō 西城 秀樹

Background information
- Born: Tatsuo Kimoto (木本 龍雄, Kimoto Tatsuo); April 13, 1955; Hiroshima, Japan
- Died: May 16, 2018 (aged 63) Yokohama, Japan
- Genres: City pop; contemporary R&B; funk; new jack swing; J-pop; rock; glam; metal; lounge
- Occupations: Singer; musician; composer; actor
- Instruments: Vocals; drums
- Years active: 1972-2018
- Spouse: Miki Makihara (m. 2001)

Hideki Saijō (西城 秀樹, Saijō Hideki; originally Tatsuo Kimoto (木本 龍雄, Kimoto Tatsuo); April 13, 1955 – May 16, 2018) was a Japanese singer, composer, actor, drummer, voice actor, and television and radio show host. Due to his numerous pioneering achievements throughout Asia in the 1970s and 1980s, he is considered an icon amongst Shōwa era idols.

With on-stage vivacity and highly acclaimed vocals as his defining trademarks, Saijō quickly came to dominate the Japanese charts of the 1970s. He was consistently promoted as part of the Shin-Gosanke (新御三家, "New Big Three") idol trio alongside two other soloists who debuted around the same time: Goro Noguchi and Hiromi Go. Almost seven years into his career, his 28th single "YOUNG MAN (Y.M.C.A.)" (a Japanese cover of the Village People song of the same name) became a social phenomenon in Japan, selling over 1.8 million copies.

== Early life ==
Hideki Saijō was born as Tatsuo Kimoto on 13 April 1955 in Atago-machi, Higashi-ku, Hiroshima City (now Higashi-ku), Hiroshima Prefecture, as the youngest of three siblings to parents Saburō and Toshiko Kimoto. In April 1959, he enrolled in Rissho Kindergarten. As a child, he often sang "Black Petals," a popular song at the time, much to the distaste of his teacher who advised that he sing more childish songs. In April 1962, he entered Onaga Elementary School in Hiroshima City. Influenced by his father, who had played jazz guitar as a hobby, he became familiar with Western music from an early age and began attending Hiroshima Central Jazz School. He initially studied electric guitar, followed by bass guitar, but eventually settled on drums.

In 1965, while in fourth class, he formed a rock and roll band called "Beggars" with his older brother. Through Beggars, he began performing as a drummer while still in primary school. In April 1968, he entered Futaba Junior High School in Hiroshima City. He performed on stage at the school's annual festival when his brother was in third year and he was in first year. He was greatly influenced by western musicians such as The Ventures, The Rolling Stones, Jimi Hendrix, Janis Joplin, and Chicago. This deep knowledge and appreciation of Western music later became a distinctive feature that set him apart from other idol singers.

In 1969, while in second year of secondary school, Beggars underwent a member change and the band was re-named "Gypsy". In April 1971, he entered the commerce department of Sanyō Secondary School. It was then that Kimoto became the lead vocalist of Gypsy. Until then, he had aimed to succeed in the world of rock as a drummer, but after hearing Kiyohiko Ozaki's song "Until We Meet Again", his perception of pop music shifted and he decided to become a singer. With Gypsy, he participated in the first and second Yamaha Light Music Contests and won in the China category of the competition. Around this time, he regularly performed at an R&B cafe called "Punch", and while singing there, he was scouted by a manager who had travelled down from Tokyo.

On 3 October 1971, despite facing opposition from his father against entering the entertainment industry, he ran away from home via an overnight train from Hiroshima and arrived at Tokyo Station the following morning. From there, he joined the talent agency "Geiei" and transferred to a night secondary school in Tokyo. He began living with his manager in a small room only 5.4m x 2.7m in size and practiced intensely each day. In December, he was recognised by RCA director Robbie Wada, at last making his professional debut definite.

== Career ==
Each section is subtitled with the singles that Saijō released during each timespan, mostly translated into English. For the titles in romaji, refer to the discography section down below.

=== 1972: Loving Season, Promise of Love, Chance Comes Only Once ===
Kimoto, hereinafter referred to by his stage name Hideki Saijō, made his professional debut on 25 March 1972 with the single "Loving Season", released by Victor Japan's RCA label (currently JVCKenwood Victor Entertainment Corporation). While it was not a major hit, peaking at only number 42 on the Oricon chart, national interest in Saijō's career gradually increased from this work onwards. The release of his second single, "Promise of Love", on 25 July fared better, reaching number 18 and selling an estimated 140,000 copies.

On 8 August, Saijō held his first concert "The Wild 17 Year-Old" at Tokyo Postal Savings Hall. His debut album of the same name was released on 5 November. On 26 November, he was selected as one of the five nominees for the Best New Artist Award at the 14th Japan Record Awards. He received 19 votes, but with that being just one vote short of the 20 votes necessary to win, he narrowly missed out on the award. On 4 December, he appeared on popular music programme "Night Hit Studio" for the first time, singing his third single "Chance Comes Only Once". The intense and dramatic television performances typically associated with Saijō originated from this broadcast.

=== 1973: Let's Bet on Youth, Storm of Passion, Fractured Love, Cross of Love ===
Saijō started 1973 with the release of his fourth single "Let's Bet On Youth" on 25 February, reaching number 16 on the Oricon chart. His second album, bearing the same name, was released on 25 March. The following day, Saijō held a concert titled "Hideki on Stage" at Osaka Mainichi Hall to commemorate the first anniversary of his debut. The release of his fifth single, "Storm of Passion", on 25 May sent his career to new heights as it propelled him to the top ten of the Oricon chart for the first time, peaking at number six and selling an estimated 246,000 copies.

The most significant milestone of Saijō's early career wouldn't be until 24 September, however, when his sixth single, "Fractured Love", topped the Oricon chart, with him becoming the first male idol who debuted in the 1970s to achieve this feat. Fractured Love stayed at number 1 for four consecutive weeks and sold an estimated 475,000 copies. It was also the first instance of a Hideki Saijō single incorporating dialogue into a song, a trait that went on to appear in several of his future hits.

Saijō's advertisements for "House Vermont Curry" began airing in November, leading his catchphrase in the advertisements, "Hideki, kangeki!" (meaning, "Hideki, I'm impressed!"), to become a familiar phrase to the general public. Although it was presumed that he would perform at NHK's annual music special Kōhaku Uta Gassen for the first time that year, he had not been selected to appear. Nonetheless, Saijō ended the year on a high note, winning the Vocal Award at the 15th Japan Record Awards for Fractured Love on 31 December.

=== 1974: Chain of Roses, Intense Love, Lola, Covered with Scars, Tears and Friendship ===
From 16 January, he appeared as a main cast member on popular television series, "The Kantarō Terauchi Family". His eighth single, "Chain of Roses", was released on 25 February and featured microphone stand-themed choreography. On 25 May, his ninth single, "Intense Love", was released to great success, selling 584,000 copies, the highest sales of his career so far and the second-highest of his career overall. Although it only peaked at #2 on the Oricon chart, it maintained that ranking for four consecutive weeks and is still considered one of Saijō's signature songs today.

"The Legend of Love & Sincerity", starring Saijō as teenage delinquent Makoto Taiga, was released in cinemas on 8 June. As it was met with great popularity, plans were made for it to be the start of a lengthy film franchise featuring Saijō as Makoto, in a similar vein to the Otoko wa Tsurai yo series. In the end, this did not come to fruition due to Saijō's busy schedule, with the rest of the trilogy featuring different actors as Makoto instead.

On 3 August, Saijō held his first solo stadium concert at Osaka Stadium. This was notable for the fact that he was the first Japanese soloist to achieve this feat and the second Japanese act to do so overall, following The Tigers' landmark Korakuen Stadium concert in 1968. From 1974, Saijō continued to perform live at Osaka Stadium for ten consecutive years.

On 6 October, Saijō made a triumphant return to his home province with his "Back Home Again Hiroshima" concert at Hiroshima Postal Savings Hall. On 9 October, The first series of The Kantarō Terauchi Family came to an end after 39 episodes. Saijō released his eleventh single, "Tears and Friendship", on 25 November to less commercial success than his other 1974 singles, but nonetheless maintained the streak of top 10 entries started by Storm of Passion.

On 31 December, Saijō won the Vocal Award once again at the 16th Japan Record Awards for "Lola, Covered with Scars", being the first non-enka singer to achieve this. Saijō finally made his debut appearance at NHK's 25th Kohaku Uta Gassen that night with the very same song, facing Momoe Yamaguchi as his opponent.

=== 1975: This Love's Thrill, Reckless Runaway of Love, Supreme Love, White Chapel ===
On 30 January, Saijō won the Graph Award at the 12th Golden Arrow Awards. Saijō expanded his career overseas for the first time on 15 February with the release of "LOLA" (a French version of Lola, Covered with Scars) in Belgium, France, and Switzerland. It was subsequently released in Canada on 31 March and achieved relatively great success, reaching #2 on the Canadian single chart. His twelfth Japanese single, "This Love's Thrill", was released on 25 February and did reasonably well, exceeding Tears and Friendship in sales and chart ranking.

In May, Saijō broke his arm while filming a brawl scene with Asei Kobayashi for the second series of The Kantarō Terauchi Family. From 6 June, he co-starred with Hiromi Go and Junko Sakurada in TBS television series "The Aspiration Collaboration Team". He participated in the 4th Tokyo Music Festival Domestic Competition on 29 June, winning the Golden Star Award. On 20 July, Saijō held the first large-scale outdoor concert in the history of Japanese music at a special stage in a green holiday village at the foot of Mount Fuji, beginning a nationwide concert tour which concluded on 24 August with a finale festival at Osaka Stadium.

Akogare Kayodotai came to an end on 26 September and on 10 October, a documentary film following Saijō's 1975 tour titled "BLOW UP! HIDEKI" was released, being the first film of its kind to come from Japan. On 3 November, Saijō became the first Japanese soloist to perform at Nippon Budokan. He continued to perform there on an annual basis for a decade.

=== 1976: Let's Embrace and Become Passionate, Jaguar, The Young Lions, Last Scene ===
1976 saw the start of a series of collaborations between Saijō, composer (and occasional arranger) Takashi Miki, and lyricist Yū Aku, beginning with his sixteenth single "Let's Embrace and Become Passionate", released on 25 February. Saijō participated in the 5th Tokyo Music Festival World Championship on 27 June with his seventeenth single "Jaguar". His first dinner show was held on 19 October at New Latin Quarter, a nightclub in Akasaka, Tokyo. Saijō's second Nippon Budokan concert, titled "Hideki in Budokan", was held on 3 November. On 31 December, he won the 18th Japan Record Award for Best Vocal Performance with his eighteenth single "The Young Lions".

=== 1977: Boomerang Street, Sexy Rock 'n' Roller, Unfasten the Button ===
On 30 March, Saijō commemorated the fifth anniversary of his debut with a third concert at Nippon Budokan. From 5 to 28 July, he starred in the musical "The North Wall of My Youth", written by Yu Aku, composed by Takashi Miki, directed by Asari Keita for Shiki Theatre Company. On 20 November, he performed on NHK's "Big Show: When You Take Pride in Your Youth".

Although Saijō's three 1977 singles - "Boomerang Street", "Sexy Rock 'n' Roller", "Unbutton It" - were each successful, the latter was the first of his singles to miss out on the Oricon top 10 since Let's Bet on Youth (despite outselling Sexy Rock 'n' Roller).

=== 1978: Take off Your Boots and Have Breakfast, For Love & You, Flame, Blue Sky Blue, To A Distant Lover ===
On 9 February, Saijō's twenty-third single, "Take off Your Boots and Have Breakfast", ranked at first place on TBS' popular song programme "The Best Ten" (Za Besutoten). The song marked the first single since 1975's "White Chapel" not provided to Saijō by Aku and Miki, instead featuring Katsuo Ohno as composer. This duo of Aku and Ohno, best known for working with Kenji Sawada, were later nicknamed "The Golden Combination" (Gōruden Konbi) for their joint expertise and versatility as songwriters. Saijō's choreography for the song, which involved holding out a lighter, backfired when three children imitated him on 4 March, consequently burning six buildings in Yao City, Osaka. Following the incident, Saijō tearfully pleaded on The Best Ten three days later, stating "All you good children, please don't try this at home. I won't be using a lighter anymore either". Saijō kept to his word, never including lighters in performances of the song from then on.

Saijō participated in the 7th Tokyo Music Festival World Championships with his twenty-fifth single, "Flame", on 18 June, winning the Foreign Jury Award (an award presented to the Japanese artist who is recognized as the most outstanding by a panel of foreign judges).

For the second stop of Saijō's "BIG GAME '78" summer tour, his first concert at Korakuen Stadium was held on 22 July, making him the first soloist to hold a concert at the venue as well as the third Japanese act to headline a concert there overall (following The Tigers in August 1968 and Candies' farewell concert in April 1978). The total cost of the Korakuen Stadium event was around 60 million yen (which, if adjusted for modern day rates, is around 100 million yen) and exceeded 20,000 in attendance. Four construction cranes and fifty Harley Davidson motorcycles were used as part of the show, which was all broadcast on Fuji TV the following month.

In December, Saijō's twenty-sixth single "Blue Sky Blue" ranked on The Best Ten for fourteen consecutive weeks, reached ninth place in the annual top ten, and won the Best Vocalist Award at the 7th FNS Song Festival. On December 31, Blue Sky Blue also won the Gold Award at the 20th Japan Record Awards.

== Illness and death ==
In June 2003, while promoting his new released song in South Korea, Saijō suffered a stroke which resulted in his speech being partially impaired. After several years of rehabilitation, Saijō was on his way toward full recovery until his cerebral infarction relapsed in 2011, resulting in his right side being paralysed. In spite of his failing health, Saijō courageously continued to perform to please his fans.

Saijō died from acute heart failure in a hospital in Yokohama city on May 16, 2018.

== Family ==
Saijō married Miki Makihara in 2001, and they had one daughter and two sons.

== Discography ==
Note: Some albums were released with English titles, but others were titled with English in katakana or Japanese. These have been translated into English with a romanised version of the original title in italics below.

=== Singles ===
#	Date	Title	Lyrics	Composition	Arrangement	Oricon ranking	Weeks on chart	Estimated sales	First Album	Label
1970s
1	25 Mar 1972	Loving Season (Koisuru Kisetsu)	Takashi Taka	Kyōhei Tsutsumi	Hiroshi Takada	42	16	58,000	The Wild 17 Year-Old	RCA / Victor Japan
2	25 Jul 1972	Promise of Love (Koi no Yakusoku)	Takashi Taka	Kunihiko Suzuki	Masahiko Aoi	18	20	140,000	The Wild 17 Year-Old	RCA / Victor Japan
3	25 Nov 1972	Chance Comes Only Once (Chansu wa Ichido)	Takashi Taka	Kunihiko Suzuki	Kōji Makaino	20	16	99,000	The Wild 17 Year-Old	RCA / Victor Japan
4	25 Feb 1973	Let's Bet on Youth (Seishun ni Kakeyō)	Takashi Taka	Kunihiko Suzuki	Kōji Makaino	16	15	121,000	Let's Bet on Youth	RCA / Victor Japan
5	9 May 1973	Storm of Passion (Jōnetsu no Arashi)	Takashi Taka	Kunihiko Suzuki	Kōji Makaino	6	19	246,000	Exciting Hideki - Fractured Love / Storm of Passion	RCA / Victor Japan
6	5 Sep 1973	Fractured Love (Chigireta Ai)	Kazumi Yasui	Kōji Makaino		1 (4 weeks)	22	475,000	Exciting Hideki - Fractured Love / Storm of Passion	RCA / Victor Japan
7	5 Dec 1973	Cross of Love (Ai no Jūjika)	Takashi Taka	Kunihiko Suzuki	Kōji Makaino	1	14	352,000	Hideki Saijō Recital / Hideki, Love, Shout!	RCA / Victor Japan
8	25 Feb 1974	Chain of Roses (Bara no Kusari)	Takashi Taka	Kunihiko Suzuki	Kōji Makaino	3	18	334,000	Lola, Covered with Scars	RCA / Victor Japan
9	25 May 1974	Intense Love (Hageshī Koi)	Kazumi Yasui	Kōji Makaino		2 (4 weeks)	19	584,000	Lola, Covered with Scars	RCA / Victor Japan
10	25 Aug 1974	Lola, Covered with Scars (Kizudarake no Rōra)	Daizō Saitō	Kōji Makaino		2	24	340,000	Lola, Covered with Scars	RCA / Victor Japan
11	25 Nov 1974	Tears and Friendship (Namida to Yūjō)	Takashi Taka	Kunihiko Suzuki	Tachio Akano	4	16	274,000	Hideki Saijō Recital / The Beginning of a New Love	RCA / Victor Japan
12	25 Feb 1975	This Love's Thrill (Kono Ai no Tokimeki)	Kazumi Yasui	Tachio Akano		3	15	277,000	Exciting Hideki Volume 5 - Reckless Runaway of Love / This Love's Thrill	RCA / Victor Japan
13	25 May 1975	Reckless Runaway of Love (Koi no Bōsō)	Kazumi Yasui	Kōji Makaino		3	17	341,000	Exciting Hideki Volume 5 - Reckless Runaway of Love / This Love's Thrill	RCA / Victor Japan
14	25 Aug 1975	Supreme Love (Shijō no Ai)	Kazumi Yasui	Kōji Makaino		6	12	185,000	MEMORY - Hideki Saijo's Diary of a Twenty Year-Old	RCA / Victor Japan
15	25 Oct 1975	White Chapel (Shiroi Chaperu)	Takashi Taka	Kunihiko Suzuki	Tachio Akano	4	18	226,000	MEMORY - Hideki Saijo's Diary of a Twenty Year-Old	RCA/RVC
16	25 Feb 1976	Let's Embrace and Become Passionate (Kimi Yo Dakarete Atsukunare)	Yū Aku	Takashi Miki		3	15	336,000	The Love and Passion of Youth	RCA/RVC
17	5 Jun 1976	Jaguar (Jagā)	Yū Aku	Takashi Miki		3	14	237,000	Hideki Saijo Golden Hit Deluxe 16	RCA/RVC
18	5 Sep 1976	The Young Lions (Wakaki Shishitachi)	Yū Aku	Takashi Miki		4	21	230,000	The Young Lions	RCA/RVC
19	20 Dec 1976	Last Scene (Rasuto Shīn)	Yū Aku	Takashi Miki		8	14	226,000	5 Years of Progress / Hideki Saijō	RCA/RVC
20	15 Mar 1977	Boomerang Street (Būmeran Sutorīto)	Yū Aku	Takashi Miki	Mitsuo Hagita	6	14	212,000	5 Years of Progress / Hideki Saijō	RCA/RVC
21	5 Jun 1977	Sexy Rock 'n' Roller (Sekushī Rokkunrōrā)	Yū Aku	Takashi Miki	Mitsuo Hagita	7	12	138,000	Hideki Saijō Special	RCA/RVC
22	5 Sep 1977	Unfasten the Button (Botan wo Hazuse)	Yū Aku	Takashi Miki		12	19	140,000	Take off Your Boots and Have Breakfast	RCA/RVC
23	1 Jan 1978	Take off Your Boots and Have Breakfast (Būtsu wo Nuide Chōshoku wo)	Yū Aku	Katsuo Ohno	Mitsuo Hagita	7	15	217,000	Take off Your Boots and Have Breakfast	RCA/RVC
24	5 Mar 1978	For Love & You (Anata to Ai no tame ni)	Ryō Shōji	Katsuo Ohno	Kimio Mizutani	6	14	214,000	Very Best Series / Hideki Saijō	RCA/RVC
25	25 May 1978	Flame (Honō)	Yū Aku	Kōji Makaino		5	15	257,000	BIG GAME'78 HIDEKI	RCA/RVC
26	25 Aug 1978	Blue Sky Blue (Burū Sukai Burū)	Yū Aku	Kōji Makaino		3	21	293,000	Chapter 7: Eternal Love / Hideki Saijō	RCA/RVC
27	25 Nov 1978	To A Distant Lover (Harukanaru Koibito e)	Machiko Ryū	Kōji Makaino		8	14	193,000	YOUNG MAN/HIDEKI FLYING UP	RCA/RVC
28	21 Feb 1979	YOUNG MAN (Y.M.C.A.)	Victor Willis Henri Belolo Ryūji Amagai	Jacques Morali	Kazuo Ōtani	1 (5 weeks)	21	1,808,000	YOUNG MAN/HIDEKI FLYING UP	RCA/RVC
29	21 May 1979	Hop Step Jump (Hoppu Suteppu Janpu)	Hikaru Yamazaki	Kimio Mizutani	Kimio Mizutani Jun Satō	2	19	369,000	BIG GAME'79 HIDEKI	RCA/RVC
30	5 Sep 1979	If You Have Courage (Yūki ga Areba)	Keisuke Yamakawa	Kyōhei Tsutsumi	Mitsuo Hagita	3	19	308,000	SONGS / Hideki Saijō	RCA/RVC
1980s
31	5 Jan 1980	Tragic Friendship (Kanashiki Yūjō)	Keisuke Yamakawa	Kyōhei Tsutsumi	Kimio Mizutani	6	15	274,000	Gazing at a Limitless Tomorrow / Hideki Saijō	RCA/RVC
32	21 Mar 1980	Garden of Love (AI NO SONO) (Ai no Sono)	Stevie Wonder Keisuke Yamakawa	Stevie Wonder	Ryuichi Sakamoto	7	14	238,000	Best Hit / Hideki Saijō	RCA/RVC
33	5 Jun 1980	Our Era (Oretachi no Jidai)	Takashi Taka	Kimio Mizutani	Jun Satō	6	10	152,000	BIG SUNSHINE / Hideki Saijō	RCA/RVC
34	21 Jul 1980	Endless Summer (Endoresu Samā)	Fumiko Okada	Kimio Mizutani	Motoki Funayama	12	11	121,000	BIG GAME'80 HIDEKI	RCA/RVC
35	5 Oct 1980	Santa Maria's Prayer (Santa Maria no Inori)	Rei Nakanishi	Makoto Kawaguchi	Katsuhisa Hattori	13	12	111,000	Best Hit / Hideki Saijō	RCA/RVC
36	16 Dec 1980	Sleepless Night (Nemurenu Yoru)	Kazumasa Oda		Motoki Funayama	10	15	271,000	HIDEKI SONG BOOK	RCA/RVC
37	21 Mar 1981	Little Girl (Ritoru Gāru)	Machiko Ryū	Kimio Mizutani		9	14	195,000	Pop 'n' Girl - Hideki	RCA/RVC
38	21 Jun 1981	Sexy Girl (Sekushī Gāru)	Yokohama Ginbae (band)		Kei Wakakusa	10	13	142,000	BIG GAME'81 HIDEKI	RCA/RVC
39	5 Sep 1981	Sentimental Girl (Senchimentaru Gāru)	Ryūji Amagai	Kisaburō Suzuki	Kei Wakakusa	17	14	98,000	Hideki Saijo Best Hit Collection	RCA/RVC
40	20 Dec 1981	Gypsy (Jipushī)	Yukinojo Mori	Kisaburō Suzuki	Motoki Funayama	15	14	136,000	Youth 3650 / Hideki Saijō	RCA/RVC
41	25 Mar 1982	Southern Cross (Minami Jūjisei)	Machiko Ryū	Kimio Mizutani	Jun Satō	6	14	229,000	CRYSTAL LOVE / Hideki Saijō	RCA/RVC
42	21 Jun 1982	Saint/Girl (Sei・Shōjo)	Takashi Matsumoto	Takuro Yoshida	Ichizō Seo	9	14	174,000	Youth 3650 / Hideki Saijō	RCA/RVC
43	20 Sep 1982	Castaways (Hyōryūshatachi)	Masao Ishizaka		Ichizō Seo	15	10	82,000	HIDEKI RECITAL - Autumn Dramatic	RCA/RVC
44	1 Feb 1983	Gyarandu (Gyarandu)	Monta Yoshinori		Kazuo Ōtani	14	14	137,000	It's You	RCA/RVC
45	30 Jun 1983	Night Games (Naito Gēmu)	Edwin Hamilton Iori Yamamoto	Edwin Hamilton	Norio Maeda	19	12	85,000	BIG GAME'83 HIDEKI FINAL IN STADIUM CONCERT	RCA/RVC
46	15 Sep 1983	The "Still" of Sadness (Kanashimi no Still)	Yumi Morita	Tsugutoshi Gotō		29	7	45,000	BEST 16 Hideki Saijō	RCA/RVC
47	25 Jan 1984	Do You Know	Reiko Yukawa	Hiroyoshi Oda	Kazuo Ōtani	30	8	43,000	GENTLE・A MAN	RCA/RVC
48	5 Jul 1984	From the Back, I Love You (Senaka kara I Love You)	Masao Urino	Tsugutoshi Gotō		30	7	33,000	From the Back, I Love You / Hideki Saijō	RCA/RVC
49	15 Oct 1984	The Jitterbug's Embrace -Careless Whisper- (Dakishimete Jiruba - Careless Whisper-)	George Michael Andrew Ridgeley Yumi Morita	George Michael Andrew Ridgeley	Keiichi Maruyama	18	17	154,000	Myself / Hideki Saijō	RCA/RVC
50	5 Feb 1985	Ten Thousand Light Years of Love (Ichiman Kōnen no Ai)	Akira Ootsu	Daisuke Inōe		12	10	100,000	'85 HIDEKI Special in Budokan - for 50 songs -	RCA/RVC
51	9 May 1985	Misty Blue (Misutī・Burū)	Yumi Morita	Akira Okamoto	Mitsuo Hagita	27	6	38,000	HIDEKI SAIJO	RCA/RVC
52	5 Sep 1985	BEAT STREET	Minako Yoshida	Toshiki Kadomatsu		51	-	10,000	TWILIGHT MADE ...HIDEKI	RCA/RVC
53	21 Nov 1985	Into Your Arms -In Search of Love- (Ude no naka e -In Search of Love-)	Barry Manilow Minako Yoshida	Barry Manilow Howie Rice	Motoki Funayama	10	11	112,000	HIDEKI SAIJO	RCA/RVC
53	21 Feb 1986	Into Your Arms -In Search of Love- (Ude no naka e -In Search of Love-) (12 inch single version)	Barry Manilow Minako Yoshida	Barry Manilow Howie Rice	Motoki Funayama	-	-	-	HIDEKI SAIJO	RCA/RVC
54	10 Apr 1986	Eyes of Reminiscence 〜LOLA〜 (Tsuioku no Hitomi 〜LOLA〜)	Akira Ootsu	Toshiyuki Sekiguchi	Motoki Funayama	26		23,000	BEST PACK / Hideki Saijō	RCA/RVC
55	5 Sep 1986	Rain of Dream (Sins of Dreams) (Rain of Dream Yume no Tsumi)	Ikki Matsumoto	Takuji Sawamura	Hiroyuki Namba	44		8,000	BEST PACK / Hideki Saijō	RCA/RVC
56	5 Dec 1986	The Promised Journey 〜Returning to Port〜 (Yakusoku no Tabi 〜Kikō〜)	Yumi Morita	Tsugutoshi Gotō		41		18,000	BEST PACK / Hideki Saijō	RCA/RVC
57	21 May 1987	New York Girl	Howard Hewett George Duke Yasushi Akimoto	Howard Hewett George Duke	George Duke	50	3	10,000	BEST PACK / Hideki Saijō	RCA/RVC
58	21 Nov 1987	A Ballad Heard by the Heart (Kokoro de Kiita Barādo)	Shin'nosuke Uesugi	Kingo Hamada	Kazuo Ōtani	73		7,000	BEST PACK / Hideki Saijō	RCA / BMG Victor
59	1 Apr 1988	Blue Sky	Rei Nakanishi	Daisuke Inōe	Kunio Muramatsu	60	4	10,000	33 Years-Old	RCA / BMG Victor
60	6 Jul 1988	Summer Temptation (Natsu no Yūwaku)	Rei Nakanishi	Daisuke Inōe	Motoki Funayama	94	1	2,000	33 Years-Old	RCA / BMG Victor
61	31 Aug 1988	One 〜For Those You Love〜 (ONE 〜Aisuru Hito no tame ni〜)	Keisuke Yamakawa	Makoto Matsushita		XX	XX	XX	The 35th Anniversary Memorial Box HIDEKI Complete Singles 1972–1999	RCA / BMG Victor
62	1 Nov 1988	33 Years Old (Sanjūsan-sai)	Rei Nakanishi	Julio Iglesias	Mitsuo Hagita	49	4	12,000	33 Years-Old	RCA / BMG Victor
63	21 Jul 1989	Let's Meet by the Riverside (Ribāsaido de Aimashou)	Kazuko Kobayashi	Kingo Hamada	Motoki Funayama	[didn't chart]	[didn't chart]	-	Golden Earrings	RCA / BMG Victor
1990s
64	21 Jul 1990	SHAKE MY DAY	Ikki Matsumoto	Sergio Portaluri Fulvio Zafret David Sion	Shirō Sagisu	[didn't chart]	[didn't chart]	-	HIDEKI DANCE3	RCA / BMG Victor
65	25 Mar 1991	Rock Your Fire	Kenzō Saeki	Tetsurō Oda		91	2	5,000	MAD DOG	RCA / BMG Victor
66	21 Apr 1991	Run, Honest Person (Hashire Shōjikimono)	Momoko Sakura	Tetsurō Oda		17	12	114,000	MAD DOG	RCA / BMG Victor
67	21 Nov 1991	Once Again (Moichido)	Chihiro Sawa	Seiichiro Kuribayashi	Daisuke Ikeda	[didn't chart]	[didn't chart]	-	Hideki Saijō Single Collection - The Path of 77	RCA / BMG Victor
68	21 Nov 1992	Boomerang Straight (Būmeran Sutorēto)	Yū Aku Kaori Nakahara	Takashi Miki Yoshio Tatano	Daisuke Ikeda	[didn't chart]	[didn't chart]	-	Hideki Saijō Single Collection - The Path of 77	RCA / BMG Victor
69	21 Nov 1993	So Many Stars Are Falling (Ikutsu mo no Hoshi ga Nagare)	Hirosuke Fumita		Fujimaru Yoshino	[didn't chart]	[didn't chart]	-	HIDEKI SAIJO CONCERT 39	RCA / BMG Victor
70	23 Feb 1994	SAYYEA', JAN-GO	Kazuko Sakata	Daisuke Inōe	Takuo Sugiyama	[didn't chart]	[didn't chart]	-	Hideki Saijō Single Collection - The Path of 77	RCA / BMG Victor
71	21 Jan 1995	Twilight, Stay by My Side (Tasogare yo, Soba ni Ite)	Toyohisa Araki	Keisuke Hama	Toshiro Imaizumi	69	17	74,000	HIDEKI SAIJO CONCERT 39	RCA / BMG Victor
72	7 Jun 1995	There's No Stopping Love 〜Turn It into Love〜 (Ai ga Tomaranai 〜Turn It into Love〜)	Neko Oikawa	Mike Stock Matt Aitken Pete Waterman	Fujimaru Yoshino	83	2	7,000	Hideki Saijō Single Collection - The Path of 77	RCA / BMG Victor
73	22 Nov 1995	Door of the Heart (Kokoro no Tobira)	Toyohisa Araki	Keisuke Hama	Fujimaru Yoshino	[didn't chart]	[didn't chart]	-	Hideki Saijō Single Collection - The Path of 77	RCA / BMG Victor
74	5 Jun 1996	round'n'round	Satori Shiraishi			70	3	14,000	Rock To The Future	RCA / BMG Victor
75	18 Dec 1996	Parasite Love (Parasaito・Ravu)				77	1	5,000	Rock To The Future	RCA / BMG Victor
76	6 Aug 1997	moment	Gorō Matsui	Yoshiki		29	10	84,000	Hideki Saijō Single Collection - The Path of 77	RCA / BMG Japan
77	21 May 1998	Let's Start with Two Rounds (Tsūraundo kara Hajimeyō)	Yumi Matsutoya			[didn't chart]	[didn't chart]	-	Hideki Saijō Single Collection - The Path of 77	RCA / BMG Funhouse
78	13 Apr 1999	Last Love (Saigo no Ai)				80	1	2,000	HIDEKI 90's	RCA / BMG Funhouse
79	26 May 1999	Turn A Turn (Tān A Tān)				27	3	24,000	HIDEKI UNFORGETTABLE - HIDEKI SAIJO ALL TIME SINGLES SINCE 1972	Starchild Records (King Record Co.)
80	17 Nov 1999	Bailamos 〜Tonight we dance〜				30	6	31,000	Bailamos 2000	Universal Polydor
2000s
81	26 Apr 2000	Love Torture	m.c.A.T			79	1	3,000	Bailamos 2000	Universal Polydor
82	17 Oct 2000	The Edge of Time (Toki no Kizahashi)	Ryūichi Kawamura			46	3	10,000	Bailamos 2000	Universal Polydor
83	23 May 2001	Jasmine	Minako Yoshida	Ryūichi Kawamura		77	1	3,000	Future Songbook 1999–2007	Universal Polydor
84	26 Jun 2002	Everybody Dance	Satomi Arimori			72	1	3,000	Future Songbook 1999–2007	Universal
85	23 Jul 2003	It Isn't a Large Pile of Rubbish (Sodai gomi ja nē)	Tsunku			33	3	9,000	Future Songbook 1999–2007	Universal
86	27 Sep 2006	A Chance Encounter (Meguri Ai)	Satomi Arimori			36	4	5,000	Future Songbook 1999–2007	Universal
87	19 Aug 2009	Vegetable, Wonderful (Bejitaburu Wandafuru)	Satomi Arimori			-	-	[limited distribution, only available as a ringtone on mobile phones and iTunes]	(Not Applicable)	Nayutawave Records / Universal Music

=== Original Albums ===
#	Date	Title	Format
1970s
1	5 Nov 1972	The Wild 17 Year-Old (Wairudona Jūnana-sai)	LP Cassette Tape
1	25 Sep 1976	The Wild 17 Year-Old (Wairudona Jūnana-sai)	LP Cassette Tape
1	23 Jul 1999	The Wild 17 Year-Old (Wairudona Jūnana-sai)	CD
1	18 Jun 2021	The Wild 17 Year-Old (Wairudona Jūnana-sai)	Blu-spec CD2
2	25 Mar 1973	Let's Bet on Youth (Seishun ni Kakeyō)	LP Cassette Tape
2	25 Sep 1976	Let's Bet on Youth (Seishun ni Kakeyō)	LP Cassette Tape
2	18 Jun 2021	Let's Bet on Youth (Seishun ni Kakeyō)	Blu-spec CD2
3	5 Oct 1973	Exciting Hideki - Fractured Love / Storm of Passion (Ekisaitingu Hideki - Chigireta Ai / Jōnetsu no Arashi)	LP Cassette Tape
3	25 Sep 1976	Exciting Hideki - Fractured Love / Storm of Passion (Ekisaitingu Hideki - Chigireta Ai / Jōnetsu no Arashi)	LP Cassette Tape
3	23 Jul 1999	Exciting Hideki - Fractured Love / Storm of Passion (Ekisaitingu Hideki - Chigireta Ai / Jōnetsu no Arashi)	CD
3	18 Jun 2021	Exciting Hideki - Fractured Love / Storm of Passion (Ekisaitingu Hideki - Chigireta Ai / Jōnetsu no Arashi)	Blu-spec CD2
4	15 Sep 1974	Lola, Covered with Scars (Kizudarake no Rōra)	LP Cassette Tape
4	25 Sep 1976	Lola, Covered with Scars (Kizudarake no Rōra)	LP Cassette Tape
4	23 Jul 1999	Lola, Covered with Scars (Kizudarake no Rōra)	CD
4	18 Jun 2021	Lola, Covered with Scars (Kizudarake no Rōra)	Blu-spec CD2
5	25 Jun 1975	Exciting Hideki Volume 5 - Reckless Runaway of Love / This Love's Thrill (Ekisaitingu Hideki Vol. 5 - Koi no Bōsō / Kono Ai no Tokimeki)	LP Cassette Tape
5	25 Sep 1976 (Re-issued as "Hideki Saijo Volume 7")	Exciting Hideki Volume 5 - Reckless Runaway of Love / This Love's Thrill (Ekisaitingu Hideki Vol. 5 - Koi no Bōsō / Kono Ai no Tokimeki)	LP Cassette Tape
5	23 Jul 1999	Exciting Hideki Volume 5 - Reckless Runaway of Love / This Love's Thrill (Ekisaitingu Hideki Vol. 5 - Koi no Bōsō / Kono Ai no Tokimeki)	CD
5	18 Jun 2021	Exciting Hideki Volume 5 - Reckless Runaway of Love / This Love's Thrill (Ekisaitingu Hideki Vol. 5 - Koi no Bōsō / Kono Ai no Tokimeki)	Blu-spec CD2
6	25 Jun 1976	The Love and Passion of Youth (Ai to Jōnetsu no Seishun)	LP Cassette Tape
6	17 Sep 2021	The Love and Passion of Youth (Ai to Jōnetsu no Seishun)	Blu-spec CD2
7	25 Nov 1976	The Young Lions (Wakaki Shishitachi)	LP Cassette Tape
7	17 Sep 2021	The Young Lions (Wakaki Shishitachi)	Blu-spec CD2
8	25 Jul 1977	The North Wall of My Youth / Hideki Saijo (Waga Seishun no Hokuheki / Saijo Hideki)	LP Cassette Tape
9	25 Feb 1978	Take off Your Boots and Have Breakfast (Būtsu wo Nuide Chōshoku wo)	LP Cassette Tape
9	17 Sep 2021	Take off Your Boots and Have Breakfast (Būtsu wo Nuide Chōshoku wo)	Blu-spec CD2
10	20 Dec 1978	First Flight (Fāsuto Furaito)	LP Cassette Tape
10	17 Sep 2021	First Flight (Fāsuto Furaito)	Blu-spec CD2
11	21 Jul 1979	Feeling Free	LP Cassette Tape
11	17 Sep 2021	Feeling Free	Blu-spec CD2
1980s
12	16 Feb 1980	SONGS / Hideki Saijo	LP Cassette Tape
12	23 Dec 2022	SONGS / Hideki Saijo	Blu-spec CD2
13	21 Aug 1980	BIG SUNSHINE / Hideki Saijo	LP Cassette Tape
13	23 Dec 2022	BIG SUNSHINE / Hideki Saijo	Blu-spec CD2
14	5 Jul 1981	Pop 'n' Girl - Hideki (Poppungāru・Hideki)	LP Cassette Tape
14	23 Dec 2022	Pop 'n' Girl - Hideki (Poppungāru・Hideki)	Blu-spec CD2
15	21 Jul 1982	CRYSTAL LOVE / Hideki Saijo	LP Cassette Tape
15	23 Dec 2022	CRYSTAL LOVE / Hideki Saijo	Blu-spec CD2
16	21 Jul 1983	It's You	LP Cassette Tape
16	30 Oct 2013	It's You	CD
16	23 Dec 2022	It's You	Blu-spec CD2
17	5 March 1984	GENTLE - A MAN	LP Cassette Tape
17	30 Oct 2013	GENTLE - A MAN	CD
17	23 Dec 2022	GENTLE - A MAN	Blu-spec CD2
18	21 Jul 1985	TWILIGHT MADE ...HIDEKI	LP Cassette Tape CD
18	30 Oct 2013	TWILIGHT MADE ...HIDEKI	CD
19	5 Jun 1986	FROM TOKYO	LP Cassette Tape CD
19	30 Oct 2013	FROM TOKYO	CD
20	21 Feb 1987	PRIVATE LOVERS	LP Cassette Tape CD
21	21 Apr 1988	33 Years-Old (Sanjūsan-sai)	LP Cassette Tape CD
21	30 Oct 2013	33 Years-Old (Sanjūsan-sai)	CD
22	21 Jul 1989	Golden Earrings	CD Cassette Tape
1990s
23	21 Apr 1991	MAD DOG	CD Cassette Tape

=== Cover Albums ===
#	Date	Title	Note
1970s
1	25 Apr 1974	Hideki! Exciting Pops (Hideki! Ekisaitingu poppusu)	Re-issued as "Hideki - Rock & Rock" on 25 Sep 1976
2	10 Oct 1974	Hideki Saijo's World of Rock (Saijō Hideki Rokku no Sekai)	
3	25 Aug 1976	Hideki Rock On Stage (Hideki Rokku On Sutēji)	
4	25 Nov 1977	Rock 'n' Roll Music / Hideki (Rokkunrōru Myūjikku / Hideki)	
1980s
5	5 Mar 1981	HIDEKI SONG BOOK	
6	21 Nov 1986	STRANGERS IN THE NIGHT	
1990s
7	24 Jul 1996	LIFE WORK	Saijo's first self-cover album
2000s
8	29 Mar 2000	Bailamos 2000	An EP of remixes of past hits
8	6 Mar 2013	Bailamos 2000	CD re-issue
9	27 Jun 2001	PLANETS - 30th Anniversary 12 Songs -	Saijo's second self-cover album
9	6 Mar 2013	PLANETS - 30th Anniversary 12 Songs -	CD re-issue
2010s
10	13 Apr 2015	Heartbeat (Kodou)	Saijo's third self-cover album

=== Compilation Albums ===
#	Date	Title	Note
1970s
1	25 Oct 1973	Hideki Saijo Original Golden Hit Song Collection (Saijō Hideki Orijinaru Gōruden Hitto Kyoku Shū)	
2	25 Nov 1973	Hideki Saijō Best 24 Deluxe (Saijō Hideki Besuto Nijūyon Derakkusu)	
3	25 Jun 1974	Hideki Saijō Gold 30 (Saijō Hideki Gōrudo Sanjū)	
4	25 Nov 1974	Hideki Saijō Golden Hit Deluxe (Saijō Hideki Gōruden Hitto Derakkusu)	
5	25 May 1975	Hideki Saijō Golden Hit Deluxe (Saijō Hideki Gōruden Hitto Derakkusu)	Includes different songs compared to the 1974 compilation of the same name
6	25 Oct 1975	Hideki Saijo Big Hit 20 (Saijō Hideki Biggu Hitto Nijū)	
7	25 Nov 1975	Hideki Saijo Golden Hit Deluxe 16 (Saijō Hideki Gōruden Hitto Derakkusu Jūroku)	
8	5 Nov 1976	Hideki Saijo Golden Hit Deluxe 16 (Saijō Hideki Gōruden Hitto Derakkusu Jūroku)	Includes different songs compared to the 1975 compilation of the same name
9	25 Apr 1977	5 Years of Progress / Hideki Saijo (5-Nen no Ayumi / Saijō Hideki)	
10	5 Nov 1977	Hideki Saijō Special (Saijō Hideki Supesharu)	
11	25 Apr 1978	Very Best Series / Hideki Saijō (Berī Besuto Shirīzu / Saijō Hideki)	
12	5 Dec 1978	Star My Selection Series / Hideki Saijō (Sutā Mai Serekushon Shirīzu / Saijō Hideki)	
13	5 Apr 1979	YOUNG MAN / HIDEKI FLYING UP	
13	21 Jul 1995	YOUNG MAN / HIDEKI FLYING UP	CD re-issue
13	17 Sep 2021	YOUNG MAN / HIDEKI FLYING UP	Blu-spec CD2 re-issue
1980s
14	1 Dec 1980	Best Hit / Hideki Saijo (Besuto Hitto / Saijō Hideki)	
15	6 Dec 1980	Super Tune / Hideki Saijō (Sūpā Tsuin / Saijō Hideki)	
16	13 Apr 1981	HIDEKI PRESENTS 30 SONGS from Best Hit Chart	
17	1 Nov 1981	Hideki Saijō Best 28 (Saijō Hideki Besuto Nijūhachi)	
18	1 Dec 1981	Hideki Saijo Best Hit Collection (Saijō Hideki Besuto Hitto Shū)	
19	21 Nov 1982	Youth 3650 / Hideki Saijō (Seishun 3650 / Saijō Hideki)	Released to commemorate the 10 year anniversary of Saijo's professional debut
20	16 Dec 1982	THE BEST Hideki Saijo (THE BEST Saijo Hideki)	
21	1 Dec 1983	BEST 16 Hideki Saijo (BEST 16 Saijo Hideki)	
22	5 Aug 1984	From the Back, I Love You / Hideki Saijo (Senaka kara I Love You / Saijō Hideki)	
23	24 Dec 1984	Myself / Hideki Saijō (Myself / Saijō Hideki)	
24	26 Dec 1985	HIDEKI SAIJO/IN SEARCH OF LOVE	
25	15 Nov 1986	BEST PACK / Hideki Saijō (BEST PACK / Saijō Hideki)	
26	25 Dec 1987	BEST PACK / Hideki Saijō (BEST PACK / Saijō Hideki)	Mostly the same as 1986 compilation of the same name with the exception of the first three songs
1990s
27	16 Dec 1991	Hideki House (Hideki Hausu)	
28	16 Dec 1991	HIDEKI DANCE3	
29	22 Sep 1993	History of Hideki Saijo vol.1, vol.2	
30	23 Jun 1999	Hideki Saijō Single Collection - The Path of 77 (Saijō Hideki Shinguru Korekushon - 77 no Kiseki)	
31	16 Dec 1999	HIDEKI 70's	
32	16 Dec 1999	HIDEKI 80's	
33	16 Dec 1999	HIDEKI 90's	
34	16 Dec 1999	HIDEKI B-side story	Collection of single B-Sides
2000s
35	20 Jun 2001	Essential HIDEKI 30th Anniversary Best Collection (1972-1999)	
36	10 Sep 2002	Hideki Saijo Best Number 1 Collection (Saijo Hideki Besuto Dai Ichi Shū)	
37	22 Dec 2004	GOLDEN☆BEST Hideki Saijō (GOLDEN☆BEST Saijō Hideki)	
38	11 Dec 2005	Hideki Saijō Super Best (Saijō Hideki Sūpā Besuto)	
39	1 Sep 2006	Hideki Saijo Best★BEST (Saijō Hideki Besuto Obu Besuto)	
40	20 Jun 2007	Future Songbook 1999–2007	Includes previously unreleased songs
40	6 Mar 2013	Future Songbook 1999–2007	CD re-issue
41	15 Sep 2009	Hideki Saijō Super Best (Saijō Hideki Sūpā Besuto)	Includes different songs compared to the 2005 compilation of the same name
2010s
42	28 Apr 2010	GOLDEN☆BEST deluxe Hideki Saijō (GOLDEN☆BEST deluxe Saijō Hideki)	
43	18 Jul 2012	GOLDEN☆BEST Hideki Saijō Single Collection (GOLDEN☆BEST Saijō Hideki Shinguru Korekushon)	
44	26 Jun 2013	Hideki, I'm Impressed!! MIX!! Hideki Saijō Non-Stop Hits!! (Hideki Kangeki!! MIX!! Saijō Hideki Non Sutoppu Hittsu!!)	

=== Live Albums ===
#	Date	Title	Note
1970s
1	15 Jun 1973	Hideki Saijō On Stage (Saijō Hideki On Sutēji)	Concert at Mainichi Hall, Osaka
1	25 Sep 1976	Hideki Saijō On Stage (Saijō Hideki On Sutēji)	Re-issued as "Hideki Saijō Volume 3: Hideki on Stage"
1	24 Dec 2021	Hideki Saijō On Stage (Saijō Hideki On Sutēji)	Blu-spec CD2 re-issue
2	10 Feb 1974	Hideki Saijō Recital / Hideki, Love, Shout! (Saijō Hideki Risaitaru / Hideki・Ai・Zekkyō!)	Saijo's second concert at Postal Savings Hall, Tokyo
2	24 Dec 2021	Hideki Saijō Recital / Hideki, Love, Shout! (Saijō Hideki Risaitaru / Hideki・Ai・Zekkyō!)	Blu-spec CD2 re-issue
3	5 Feb 1975	Hideki Saijō Recital / The Beginning of a New Love (Saijō Hideki Risaitaru / Atarashī Ai e no Shuppatsu)	Saijo's third concert at Postal Savings Hall, Tokyo
3	24 Dec 2021	Hideki Saijō Recital / The Beginning of a New Love (Saijō Hideki Risaitaru / Atarashī Ai e no Shuppatsu)	Blu-spec CD2 re-issue
4	25 Sep 1975	Hideki on Tour (Hideki on Tsuā)	From Saijo's first national tour
4	24 Dec 2021	Hideki on Tour (Hideki on Tsuā)	Blu-spec CD2 re-issue
5	25 Jan 1976	MEMORY - Hideki Saijo's Diary of a Twenty Year-Old (MEMORY - Saijō Hideki Nijū-sai no Nikki)	The second half consists of Saijo's first concert at Nippon Budokan
5	24 Dec 2021	MEMORY - Hideki Saijo's Diary of a Twenty Year-Old (MEMORY - Saijō Hideki Nijū-sai no Nikki)	Blu-spec CD2 re-issue
6	25 Jan 1977	HIDEKI LIVE'76	Saijo's second concert at Nippon Budokan
6	24 Jun 2022	HIDEKI LIVE'76	Blu-spec CD2 re-issue
7	20 Dec 1977	The North Wall of My Youth / Hideki Saijo (Waga Seishun no Hokuheki / Saijo Hideki)	Saijo's first musical at Nissay Theatre
7	24 Jun 2022	The North Wall of My Youth / Hideki Saijo (Waga Seishun no Hokuheki / Saijo Hideki)	Blu-spec CD2 re-issue
8	25 Jun 1978	Valentine's Day Concert Special / Hideki Saijō Sings of Love (Barentain Konsāto Supesharu / Saijō Hideki Ai wo Utau)	Concert at Tokyo Metropolitan Hibiya Public Hall
8	24 Jun 2022	Valentine's Day Concert Special / Hideki Saijō Sings of Love (Barentain Konsāto Supesharu / Saijō Hideki Ai wo Utau)	Blu-spec CD2 re-issue
9	25 Sep 1978	BIG GAME'78 HIDEKI	Selections of the Nemuro, Korakuen Stadium, Nagoya, and Osaka Stadium concerts from Saijo's nationwide BIG GAME tour
9	24 Jun 2022	BIG GAME'78 HIDEKI	Blu-spec CD2 re-issue
10	25 Feb 1979	Chapter 7: Eternal Love / Hideki Saijō (Eien no Ai Nana-shō / Saijō Hideki)	Saijo's fifth concert at Nippon Budokan
10	24 Jun 2022	Chapter 7: Eternal Love / Hideki Saijō (Eien no Ai Nana-shō / Saijō Hideki)	Blu-spec CD2 re-issue
11	9 Oct 1979	BIG GAME'79 HIDEKI	Saijo's second concert at Korakuen Stadium
11	23 Jul 1999	BIG GAME'79 HIDEKI	CD re-issue
11	24 Jun 2022	BIG GAME'79 HIDEKI	Blu-spec CD2 re-issue
1980s
12	5 Jun 1980	Gazing at a Limitless Tomorrow / Hideki Saijō (Kagirinai Ashita wo Mitsumete / Saijō Hideki)	Concert held at Nissay Theatre
13	5 Sep 1980	BIG GAME'80 HIDEKI	Saijo's third concert at Korakuen Stadium
13	24 Nov 2023	BIG GAME'80 HIDEKI	Blu-spec CD2 re-issue
14	5 Oct 1981	BIG GAME'81 HIDEKI	Saijo's fourth concert at Korakuen Stadium
14	24 Nov 2023	BIG GAME'81 HIDEKI	Blu-spec CD2 re-issue
15	5 Feb 1983	HIDEKI RECITAL - Dramatic Autumn (HIDEKI RECITAL - Aki doramachikku)	Saijo's ninth concert at Nippon Budokan
16	15 Sep 1983	BIG GAME'83 HIDEKI FINAL IN STADIUM CONCERT	Saijo's tenth and final concert at Osaka Stadium
16	24 Nov 2023	BIG GAME'83 HIDEKI FINAL IN STADIUM CONCERT	Blu-spec CD2 re-issue
17	15 Sep 1984	JUST RUN'84 HIDEKI	Saijo's eleventh concert at Nippon Budokan
18	15 Mar 1985	'85 HIDEKI Special in Budokan - for 50 songs -	Saijo's twelfth concert at Nippon Budokan, commemorating the release of 50 singles
1990s
19	21 Jun 1996	Rock To The Future (D・LIVE ORIGINAL COMPILATION)	Rock musical performated at Akasaka Blitz
2020s
20	24 Nov 2023	BIG GAME '82 HIDEKI SUMMER in OHMUTA	1982 concert held in Ōmuta City, Fukuoka

=== Box Sets ===
#	発売日	タイトル	備考
1980s
1	21 Sep 1988	HIDEKI CD BOX - Beloved 120 Songs -	Collection released to commemorate 60 singles released
1990s
2	16 Dec 1994	HIDEKI SAIJO EXCITING AGE '72-'79	Includes ten of Saijo's eleven 1970s studio albums (excludes The North Wall of My Youth) and his thirteenth compilation album YOUNG MAN / HIDEKI FLYING UP
3	16 Dec 1999	HIDEKI SUPER LIVE BOX	CD re-issues of live albums. Disc 1 contains selections of Saijo's first three live albums. Disc 2 is split between Valentine's Day Concert Special and Chapter 7: Eternal Love. Parts of Saijo's three BIG GAME live albums are on disc 3 ('78, '80, '81). Disc 4 consists of Gazing at a Limitless Tomorrow. Discs 5 and 6 cover Saijo's commemorative concert '85 HIDEKI Special in Budokan - for 50 songs -
2000s
4	17 Dec 2003	THE STAGES OF LEGEND -栄光の軌跡-	Concert re-issues on DVD. Includes, BIG GAME'83 HIDEKI FINAL IN STADIUM CONCERT, '85 HIDEKI Special in Budokan -for 50 songs-, Caravan From Tokyo -HIDEKI SAIJO CONCERT TOUR '86-, HIDEKI SAIJO CONCERT TOUR '91 FRONTIER ROAD, HIDEKI SAIJO CONCERT 3-09-Thank you-, HIDEKI SAIJO LIFE WORK 7 TREASURES, and a special bonus disc
5	19 Dec 2007	The 35th Anniversary Memorial Box HIDEKI Complete Singles 1972–1999	CD and DVD collection released to commemorate 35 years since Saijo's debut. The bonus DVD includes NHK's "Big Show: When You Take Pride in Your Youth" (Biggu Shō・Wakasa wo Hokorashiku Omou Toki ni) from 1977
2010s
6	20 Aug 2012	Screams, Passion, and Inspiration / Hideki Saijō (Zekkyō・Jōnetsu・Kangeki / Saijō Hideki)	ベスト（2CD）+カヴァー（CD）+ライブ（CD+DVD）
7	15 Jul 2015	THE STAGES OF LEGEND -Path of Glory- HIDEKI SAIJO AND MORE (Eikō no Kiseki)	DISC1からDISC7までは2003年12月17日発売のライブDVD『THE STAGES OF LEGEND -栄光の軌跡-』と同一で、DISC8とDISC9は初DVD化されたもの ・BIG GAME'83 HIDEKI FINAL IN STADIUM CONCERT ・'85 HIDEKI Special in Budokan -for 50 songs- ・Caravan From Tokyo -HIDEKI SAIJO CONCERT TOUR '86- ・HIDEKI SAIJO CONCERT TOUR '91 FRONTIER ROAD ・HIDEKI SAIJO CONCERT 3-09-Thank you- ・HIDEKI SAIJO LIFE WORK 7 TREASURES ・特典映像スペシャルDISC ・ブロウアップ ヒデキ ・HIDEKI MY LOVE Hideki Saijo IN BUDOKAN
8	15 Nov 2017	HIDEKI NHK Collection 西城秀樹 〜若さと情熱と感激と〜	DVD3枚組 / 全123曲 / 収録時間 339分。別冊歌詞ブックレット付セット 117曲が初商品化のDVD3枚組BOX
9	16 May 2019	HIDEKI UNFORGETTABLE	シングル87曲+未発表曲5曲全92曲収録。写真集、全曲解説、DVD含むBOXセット CD5枚、DVD1枚、計6枚組

=== Other appearances ===
#	発売日	タイトル	備考	
1980s
1	5 Dec 1986	SWINGIN' HOUSE	藤家虹二クインテット&ザ・キャップスによるスウィングジャズのアルバム中『Memories Of You』を日本語詞で歌唱(LP/SIDE B1、CD/トラック9に収録)	
2	30 Mar 2016	昭和同窓会アルバム	昭和時代のヒット曲を同じ時代のヒットアーティスト「2020 TOKYO FRIENDS」が歌う昭和世代向けのカバーアルバム(全17曲) トラック1(「ホップ・ステップ・ジャンプ」)、トラック17(「YOUNG MAN (Y.M.C.A.)」)	
3	27 Apr 2016	NHKみんなのうた 55 アニバーサリー・ベスト〜チョコと私〜	「陽光のなかの僕たち」	NHK『みんなのうた』1988年4〜5月放送曲

=== Video Releases ===
#	発売日	タイトル	フォーマット	備考
1980s
1	10 Feb 1982	HIDEKI MY LOVE Hideki Saijo IN BUDOKAN	VHD	日本武道館での第8回コンサートのライブ・ビデオ
2	5 Mar 1984	BIG GAME'83 HIDEKI FINAL IN STADIUM CONCERT	VHS	大阪球場での第10回ファイナルコンサートのライブ・ビデオ
3	21 Mar 1985	ブロウアップ ヒデキ	VHS	1975年に開催された『西城秀樹・全国縦断サマーフェスティバル』を追って撮影されたドキュメンタリー映画（同年に全国公開上映）のビデオ
3	15 Jul	ブロウアップ ヒデキ	DVD	復刻DVD
4	21 Apr 1985	'85 HIDEKI Special in Budokan - for 50 songs -	VHS	シングル50曲記念となる日本武道館での第12回コンサートのライブ・ビデオ
4	21 Apr 1985	'85 HIDEKI Special in Budokan - for 50 songs -	LD	シングル50曲記念となる日本武道館での第12回コンサートのライブ・ビデオ
5	15 Feb 1987	Caravan From Tokyo-HIDEKI SAIJO CONCERT TOUR '86-	VHS	海外コンサートツアーのライブ・ビデオ
6	21 Jun 1987	HIDEKI ADVENTURE IN THE REEF/西城秀樹 青の世界 グレート・バリア・リーフ	VHS	カバー曲含めた全11曲（1,9,11 は西城のオリジナル）
6	21 Jun 1987	HIDEKI ADVENTURE IN THE REEF/西城秀樹 青の世界 グレート・バリア・リーフ	LD	カバー曲含めた全11曲（1,9,11 は西城のオリジナル）
1990s
7	2 Oct 1991	HIDEKI SAIJO CONCERT TOUR '91 FRONTIER ROAD	VHS	東京・厚生年金会館での20周年記念コンサートのライブ・ビデオ
8	5 Jul 1995	HIDEKI SAIJO CONCERT 39	VHS	ライブ・ビデオ
9	22 Jan 1997	HIDEKI SAIJO LIFE WORK 7 TREASURES	VHS	ヒストリー・ビデオ
2000s
10	22 Nov 2000	Bailamos 2000	VHS	東京・厚生年金会館でのコンサートを収録
10	22 Nov 2000	Bailamos 2000	DVD	東京・厚生年金会館でのコンサートを収録
2010s
11	15 Nov 2017	HIDEKI NHK Collection 西城秀樹 〜若さと情熱と感激と〜	DVD	「紅白歌合戦」「レッツゴーヤング」「ビッグショー」「歌謡コンサート」等、NHKの歌番組から厳選された123シーンを収録。映像117曲及び全18回出場中16回の「紅白歌合戦」出場歌唱シーンを収録
2020s
12	25 Mar 2020	'85 HIDEKI Special in Budokan - for 50 songs -	Blu-ray	シングル50曲記念となる日本武道館での第12回コンサートのライブ・初のBlu-ray化
13	16 May 2020	西城秀樹 IN 夜のヒットスタジオ	DVD	フジテレビに現存する「夜のヒットスタジオ」のアーカイブ映像
14	25 Mar 2022	THE 50 HIDEKI SAIJO song of memories	DVD	「8時だョ!全員集合」「ザ・ベストテン」「日本レコード大賞」「セブンスターショー」他TBSでの出演集。

=== Promotional Songs ===
Title	Advertisement	Original Release
If You Believe	ハウス食品「ポテトチップス」CFソング	Feeling Free (album)
Our Era	モスクワ・オリンピック JOC応援歌	Our Era (single)
Southern Cross	東宝映画『南十字星』主題歌	Southern Cross (single)
Ten Thousand Light Years of Love	科学万博つくば '85 開会式テーマソング	Ten Thousand Light Years of Love (single)
Misty Blue	コーセー化粧品"夏のキャンペーン"テーマ・ソング	Misty Blue (single)
Wings of Love -It's All Behind Us Now-	「Wing」CMソング	Into Your Arms -In Search of Love- (single)
The Promised Journey 〜Returning to Port〜	NHK連続テレビ小説『都の風』イメージ・ソング	The Promised Journey 〜Returning to Port〜 (single)
Blue Sky	アサヒ生ビール '88キャンペーンソング	Blue Sky (single)
One 〜For Those You Love〜	日本民間放送連盟 '88 "交通安全キャンペーンソング"	One 〜For Those You Love〜 (single)
Try Today	原ヘルス工業「バブルスター」CFソング	33 Years-Old (single)
Run, Honest Person	フジテレビアニメ『ちびまる子ちゃん』エンディングテーマ	Run, Honest Person (single)
Mad Dog	Vシネマ『ザ・ヒットマン 血はバラの匂い』主題歌	MAD DOG (album)
Once Again	ハウス食品「うまいっしょ」CMソング	Once Again (single)
Boomerang Straight	TBS系TV『生生生生ダウンタウン』エンディングテーマ	Boomerang Straight (single)
LOVE SONG Forever	『STOP AIDS CONCERT』イメージソング	So Many Stars Are Falling (single)
SAYYEA', JAN-GO	Jリーグサンフレッチェ広島F.C応援歌	SAYYEA', JAN-GO (single)
There's No Stopping Love 〜Turn It into Love〜	ノエビア"コスメティク ルネッサンス"CMイメージソング	There's No Stopping Love 〜Turn It into Love〜 (single)
Door of the Heart	日本テレビ系『江戸の用心棒II』主題歌	Door of the Heart (single)
LOVE MEANS	テレビ東京系『ワールドビジネスサテライト』エンディングテーマ	round'n'round (single)
moment	CX系『HEY!HEY!HEY! MUSIC CHAMP』エンディングテーマ	moment (single)
Turn A Turn	フジテレビ系アニメーション『∀ガンダム』オープニングテーマ	Turn A Turn (single)
Bailamos 〜Tonight we dance〜	テレビ東京系『釣りロマンを求めて』テーマ曲	Bailamos 〜Tonight we dance〜 (single)
Let's Fall In Love	TBS系TV『スーパー知恵MON』エンディングテーマ曲	Bailamos 〜Tonight we dance〜 (single)
Everybody Dance	NHK教育テレビ『天才てれびくんワイド』内『ベイベーばあちゃん』エンディングテーマ	Everybody Dance (single)
Vegetable, Wonderful	NHK教育テレビ『趣味の園芸 やさいの時間』エンディングテーマ	Vegetable, Wonderful (limited release single)

=== Promotional Songs (Not For Sale) ===
- 風のシンフォニー〜あすの予感が聴こえる(文化庁第5回国民文化祭・愛媛90賛歌、作詞:益田光利/補作詞:荒木とよひさ 作曲:井上大輔 編曲:山川恵津子 非売品カセットテープ2000本、CD1000枚、レコード500枚が配布された。1990年)
- あしたへジャンプテーマ音楽(NHK教育テレビ、1986年4月7日から1996年3月13日まで放送された小学生向けの教育ドラマ。前期上條恒彦からのバトンタッチで後期を担当)
- Earth of Love 〜未来の子供たちへのメッセージ〜(1991年11月3日に福島市公会堂で行われた「第一回古関裕而記念音楽祭」参加曲(オープニング含め12楽曲収録の非売品CD)、作詞：麻生香太郎、作曲：宮川泰)
- ラッキー☆ムーチョ(ディズニー長編アニメーション映画『ラマになった王様』日本語版主題歌。原語版オープニングテーマであるトム・ジョーンズの「パーフェクト・ワールド」のカバーであり、ムーチョ☆ヒデキ名義で歌唱。2000年) なお2001年6月27日発売(2013年3月6日再発売)のセルフカヴァーアルバム「PLANETS - 30th Anniversary 12 Songs -」にボーナストラックとして収録されている。
- 旅の途中～ドイツより愛を込めて〜(桑名正博の呼びかけにより制作されたチャリティーCD、c/w『平和のハーモニー』。松本孝弘をはじめ、著名なミュージシャン達が参加している。収益はドイツ国際平和村を通じて世界の恵まれない子供たちのために使われた。2001年12月14日発売、作詞・作曲：桑名正博、編曲：芳野藤丸・河内淳貴)

=== Tribute Albums ===
#	発売日	タイトル	備考
1990年代
1	1997年 7月24日	西城秀樹ROCKトリビュート KIDS'WANNA ROCK!	西城の曲を聞いて育った次世代のロック・アーティスト達によるトリビュート・アルバム

=== Songwriting Credits ===
Year	Song	Credit	First Appearance
1972	The Bond Between Mother and Child (Haha to Ko no Kizuna)	Lyric translation	The Wild 17 Year-Old
1972	The Girl I Fell in Love With (Suki ni Natta Onnanoko)	Composition	The Wild 17 Year-Old
1977	Twist Girl (Tsuisuto Gāru)	Lyrics & Composition	Rock 'n' Roll Music / Hideki
1978	Sweet Half Moon	Composition	First Flight
1978	That Love is... (Sono ai wa)	Composition	First Flight
1978	Dry Martini (Dorai Matīni)	Composition	First Flight
1978	Je T'aime	Composition	First Flight
1978	Seaside Illusion (Umibe no Maboroshi)	Composition	First Flight
1978	If You Love Me	Composition	First Flight
1984	Winter Blue	Composition	Do You Know
1984	Careless (Īkagen)	Composition	J·U·S·T·R·U·N '84 HIDEKI
1988	知己良朋 *	Composition	回到你身邊
1988	Sail Again	Composition	One 〜For Those You Love〜
2002	Madness Love	Composition	Everybody Dance

* A composition provided by Saijo to Cantopop singer Andy Lau.

== Media Appearances and Performances ==
Note: Often, Saijo's films were titled differently to the original Japanese versions when distributing them to English-speaking audiences. In the "Title" sections of these entries, the original title is first translated into English, then the title for English distribution is included in brackets, and lastly, a romanised version of the Japanese title is italicised in brackets below.

=== Film ===
Year	Title	Role	Director	Notes
1973	Age of Maturity (Toshigoro)	"Singer"	Hirokazu Ichimura (市村泰一)	Saijō's film debut, albeit being a minor role. In the film, he performs "Let's Bet on Youth" (青春に賭けよう), his fourth single
1973	Love Is After School (Koi wa Hōkago)	"Singer"	Jō Hirose (広瀬襄)	
1973	A Single Teardrop (Hitotsubu no Namida)	"Singer"	Hirokazu Ichimura (市村泰一)	
1974	The First Star of Happiness (Shiawase no Ichiban Hoshi)	Hideo Tōjō; Hideki Saijō	Shigeyuki Yamane (山根成之)	In this film, Saijō alternates between two roles: cleaning shop clerk Hideo and vocalist Hideki
1974	Love & Sincerity (The Legend of Love & Sincerity) (Ai to Makoto)	Makoto Taiga	Shigeyuki Yamane (山根成之)	An adaptation of a manga series of the same name and Saijō's first starring role. In 2012, another film based on the franchise, titled "For Love's Sake", was directed by Takashi Miike and features references to Saijō.
1975	The Path I Walk (Let's Go, Grandma!) (Ore no Iku Michi)	Tsuchiya Kōzō	Shigeyuki Yamane (山根成之)	
1975	Blow Up! Hideki	Himself	Kogi Tanaka	Japan's first music documentary, covering Saijo's 1975 tour
1980	Botchan			Saijo's first voice acting role for an animated film and the eighth animated feature produced for Fuji TV's "Nissei Family Special" programme
1981	Sanshiro Sugata (Sanshiro the Judoist) (Sugata Sanshirō)			The thirteenth animated feature produced for Fuji TV's "Nissei Family Special" programme. Based on Akira Kurosawa's debut film of the same name, which was occasionally distributed overseas as "Judo Saga"
1984	Beaten by Black Rain			Saijo's first voice acting role for an animated film with a theatrical release. The film stars Hideki's character, Junji Takimura, with a plot that follows victims of the 1945 bombing of Saijo's birthplace, Hiroshima
1986	Desperate Pursuit			
1987	Iron Angels			
1991	The Hitman Blood Smells Like Roses			
1997	Gendai ninkyoden			
2005	Executive Koala			

=== Film (Animated) ===
- The King Who Became a Llama (Buena Vista Pictures, 2001) - Theme Song Guy

=== Television (Animated) ===
- Baby Grandma (NHK Educational TV "Genius TV-kun Wide" 2002) - as HIDEKI Episode 33: "A big fuss over class observation!", Episode 36: "Passed the first audition!?", Episode 46: "It's the second audition!" !"

=== Television (Variety) ===
- Jump out! Mari-chan (TBS, January 24, 1974, 17th "Aladdin and the Magic Lamp")
- Habatake! Mari-chan (TBS, October 3–17, 1974, 1st "Anne of Green Gables (Part 1)", 2nd "Anne of Green Gables (2nd part)", 3rd "Anne of Green Gables (2nd part)" Part 2)
- Rock in Hideki (Fuji Television, 1978)
- UFO Seven Great Adventure (TBS, June 1, 1978), 9th "Rumiko Hideki's Arctic Exploration"
- Yanmar Family Hour Fly! Son Goku (TBS series, June 27, 1978 "Crisis in the Partheno Kingdom ~ Sanzo's family full of scars ~", July 4 of the same year "Crisis in the Partheno Kingdom ~ Partheno Prince Dies in Love! ~"
- Magical 7 Great Adventures (TBS, 1978–1979), 10th episode Ultraman vs. Gasura?, 20th episode Hakone's love is the greatest danger in the world
- Miracle TV launch (TBS, 1979–1980), 1st episode "(Title unknown)", 10th episode "Sumo broadcast Dohyo ga Mapbutatsu"
- Star Dash No. 1! (TBS, 1980), 9th episode "Hitomi is scouted as a model", 20th episode "Is the baby you picked up a present?"
- House Children's Theater (TV Asahi, September 2, 1980 - March 24, 1981, during this period the title was changed to House Children's Story Theater).
- Morning Salad (Nippon Television, May 1981 - March 30, 1985)
- The Star Hideki Saijō ~Four Seasons of Life~ (Fuji Television, June 1983 (all 4 episodes))
- Hideki Saijō Diving the Great Barrier Reef (TV Tokyo, March 14, 1987)
- Hideki Saijō Undersea Exploration of the Secret Island of the Maldives (TV Tokyo, January 1, 1989))
- Hideki Saijō 4973km Philippine Adventure (TV Tokyo, April 23, 1990)
- TV Cruise Papaya Next Door (Fuji Television, 1994)
- Youth Pops (NHK, 1998–2002)
- Same song (China Central Television, 2000)
- Akiro Hidaka's storytelling and Edo human affairs story "Konya Takao" (Sapporo Television, December 28, 2004)
- Marumaru Chibi Maruko-chan Episode 19 (Fuji TV, September 27, 2007, appeared in the drama part of a 2-hour special of a children's variety show, role name: Fish Dragon)
- Hobby Gardening Vegetable Time (NHK Educational Television, 2009)
  - Sings the theme song "Vegetable Wonderful" (lyrics: Satomi Arimori/composer: Masanori Takumi). The song has been released as a digital single on the iTunes Store.
- Food journey around the kitchen (NHK BS Premium, 2013–2014)
- Hideki's excitement! NEXT House (BS Japan, April - September 2014) - MC

=== Music Show Performances ===
Night Hit Studio - 192 appearances
Year	Song	Weeks
1972- 1973	Chance Comes Only Once	2
1973	Let's Bet on Youth	1
1973	Storm of Passion	1
1973	Fractured Love	1
1973- 1974	Cross of Love	2
1974	Chain of Roses	3
1974	Intense Love	3
1974	Lola, Covered in Scars	3
1974- 1975	Tears and Friendship	4
1975	This Love's Thrill	2
1975	Reckless Runaway of Love	3
1975	Supreme Love	2
1975	White Chapel	3
1976	Let's Embrace and Become Passionate	5
1976	Jaguar	3
1976	The Young Lions	4
1976- 1977	Last Scene	2
1977	Boomerang Street	3
1977	Sexy Rock 'n' Roller	1
1977	Unfasten the Button	4
1977	Lola, Covered in Scars	1
1977- 1978	Take Off Your Boots, Let's Have Breakfast	3
1978	For Love & You	2
1978	Flame	3
1978	Blue Sky Blue	4
1978- 1979	To a Distant Lover	3
1979	YOUNG MAN (Y.M.C.A.)	3
1979	Hop Step Jump	4
1979	If You Have Courage	8
1980	Tragic Friendship	3
1980	Garden of Love	2
1980	Our Era	2
1980	Endless Summer	3
1980	Santa Maria's Prayer	3
1980- 1981	Sleepless Night	4
1981	Little Girl	3
1981	Sexy Girl	3
1981	Sentimental Girl	4
1981- 1982	Gypsy	4
1982	Southern Cross	4
1982	Saint/Girl	4
1982	Castaways	4
1982- 1983	Gyarandu	5
1983	Night Games	4
1983	The "Still" of Sadness	5
1983- 1984	Do You Know	3
1984	Through the Night	1
1984	Jealousy (Jerashī)	1
1984	From the Back, I Love You	4
1984	Pacific (Pashifikku)	1
1984- 1985	The Jitterbug's Embrace	4
1985	Ten Thousand Light Years of Love	3
1985	Misty Blue	2
1985	Boogie Woogie Whisky Rain	1
1985	Real Time * (Riaru Taimu)	1
1985	BEAT STREET *	3
1985	When a Man Loves a Woman (Otoko ga Onna wo Aisuru Toki)	1
1985- 1986	In Search of Love	4
1985	Hit song medley	1
1985	Christmas Eve *	1
1985	Wings of Love * (Ai no Tsubasa)	1
1986	Eyes of Reminiscence 〜LOLA〜	3
1986	City Dreams from Tokyo	1
1986	Whispers of Dreams (Yume no Sasayaki)	1
1986	Rain of Dream (Sins of Dreams)	3
1986	Memories of You *	1
1986	Sing Sing Sing *	1
1986	SUN *	1
1986	The Traitor's Journey * (Uragirimono no tabi)	1
1986	The Promised Journey	3
1987	New York Girl	4
1987	A Ballad Heard by the Heart	2
1988	Blue Sky	1
1988	33 Years-Old	2

The Best Ten - 154 appearances
Year	Song	Peak	Weeks
1978	Take off Your Boots and Have Breakfast	1	9
1978	For Love & You	2	8
1978	Flame	4	11
1978	Blue Sky Blue	3	14
1979	To A Distant Lover	5	8
1979	YOUNG MAN(Y.M.C.A.)	1	14
1979	Hop Step Jump	2	10
1979	If You Have Courage	1	12
1980	Tragic Friendship	4	9
1980	Garden of Love	3	9
1980	Our Era	3	6
1980	Endless Summer	4	3
1980	Santa Maria's Prayer	9	3
1981	Sleepless Night	3	8
1981	Little Girl	5	7
1981	Sexy Girl	7	3
1982	Gypsy	10	1
1982	Southern Cross	4	7
1982	Saint/Girl	6	5
1983	Gyarandu	8	3
1984- 1985	The Jitterbug's Embrace	9	3
1985	In Search of Love	9	1

* This asterisk indicates that on one occasion, this song was performed alongside another song on Night Hit (i.e.: SUN and The Traitor's Journey were performed on the same episode). Each song has been allocated its own cell for clarity.

Youth Pops (Seishun no poppusu) **
Year	Song	With
1997	(Summer Live)	-
1998	(New Year's Dream Sound)	-
1998	Don't Let Me Down	-
1998	Proud Mary	-
1998	Tonight's the Night (Gonna Be Alright)	VOX-IV
1998	My Cherie Amour	
1998	Rhythm of the Rain	Hiroko Moriguchi
1998	Smoke on the Water	
1998	And I Love Her	
1998	Get Back	
1998	Hey Jude	Akira Fuse, Gontiti, Hiroko Moriguchi, Sunplaza Nakano, Hiro Tsunoda, Hikaru Nishida
1998	Unchain My Heart	
1998	Lovin' You Baby	
1998	Happy Xmas (War Is Over)	Hiroko Moriguchi
1998	White Christmas	Gontiti
1999	The Last Waltz	
1999	Joy to the World	
1999	Unchained Melody	
1999	Hey Paula	Hiroko Moriguchi
1999	Angie	
1999	The Legend Of Xanadu	
1999	Twist and Shout	Jon Kabira
1999	Jailhouse Rock	Akira Fuse
1999	Aquarela do Brasil	Marcia
1999	Blue Suede Shoes	Katsuya Kobayashi, Akira Fuse
1999	When a Man Loves a Woman	
1999	Unforgettable	Ikuko Kawai
1999	Love Letters in the Sand	
1999	Stand By Me	
1999	When I Fall in Love	Yū Hayami
2000	Delilah	Akira Fuse, Yū Hayami, Gutch Yuzo, Hikaru Nishida, rua, JAYWALK
2000	(They Long to Be) Close to You	Keiko Toda
2000	Superstition	
2000	Unforgettable	Yoko Kon
2000	(I Can't Get No) Satisfaction	Keiko Terada
2000	Angie	
2000	The Loco-motion	Hideki Tōgi
2000	La Bamba	
2000	Norwegian Wood (This Bird Has Flown)	Gontiti
2000	Copacabana	
2000	Norwegian Wood (This Bird Has Flown)	Gontiti
2000	Hold On, I'm Coming'	George Yanagi (with drums by Saijo)

** Saijo made further appearances on Youth Pops, but information about them currently cannot be found

Music Fair
Year	Song	With	Special
1974	Sometimes I Feel Like a Motherless Child	Mieko Hirota	-
1976	Hello Mary Lou, Tennessee Waltz, Johnny Angel, We're an American Band	Ayumi Ishida, Cherish	-
1976	Feelings, Venus and Mars, Can't Buy Me Love, Silly Love Songs	Izumi Yukimura	-
1978	Sometimes When We Touch, The House of the Rising Sun, Copacabana, Don't Let Me Down	Hatsumi Shibata	-
1978	You're the One That I Want, Blue Moon, Autumn, Grease Medley, When I Need You	Junko Ōhashi	-
1978	If You Love Me (Let Me Know), Natalì	Aki Yashiro, Goro Noguchi, Momoe Yamaguchi	700th episode
1980	One Way Ticket (To The Blues), Passion for Paris (An American in Paris), Santa Maria's Prayer	-	-
1980	Hideki Disco Special	-	-
1980	Tragic Friendship, A Love Song With No Name (Daimei no Nai Ai no Uta), One Voice	-	-
	Let It Be	Izumi Yukimura, Hatsumi Shibata, Sugar, Shigeru Matsuzaki	-
	Thank You for the Music	Judy Ongg, Mayo Shono, Twist	800th episode
1981	All I Have to Do Is Dream	Mariya Takeuchi	-
1982	Hier encore	Saburō Kitajima, Hiromi Go	-
1984	Love is Over, Do You Know, Save the Last Dance for Me	Yukari Ito, Ouyang Fei Fei	-
1984	Lipstick on Your Collar, Johnny B. Goode, Heartbreak Hotel, Blue Suede Shoes, I Need Your Love Tonight, Rock and Roll Music, The Jitterbug's Embrace, And I Love Her	Rumiko Koyanagi, Mitsuyo Nemoto	-
1985	LOVE, Sleep Softly (Sotto Oyasumi)	Hibari Misora	-
1985	Heartbreak Hotel, Hound Dog, I Need Your Love Tonight, Jailhouse Rock, Blue Suede Shoes, Are You Lonesome Tonight?, I Can't Help Falling in Love	Masaaki Sakai, Shigeru Matsuzaki, Rats & Star	Semicentennial anniversary of Elvis Presley's debut
1985	Around the World, Sound of Silence, Love Is a Many-Splendored Thing	Izumi Yukimura, Miyuki Kosaka, Circus, Shigeru Matsuzaki	Foreign film special
1986	I Just Called to Say I Love You	Izumi Yukimura, Hiromi Go, Mariko Takahashi, Hiromi Iwasaki	1100th episode
1986	The Shadow of Your Smile, You are the Love of My Life	Yasuko Agawa	-
1987	Let's Get Married (Kekkon Shiyō Yo), To My Younger Sister (Boku no Imouto ni), New York Girl	Naoko Kawai, Takao Horiuchi	-
1987	Where Love Goes (Ai no Yukue), Summertime, Stand By Me	Mao Daichi	-
1988	Up Where We Belong, Always, You Are Everything, That's What Friends Are For, Blue Sky	Mariko Takahashi	-
1989	Copacabana, Can't Smile Without You, Let's Meet by the Riverside	Yasuko Agawa, Barry Manilow	-
1991	Young Man (Y.M.C.A.), Storm of Passion / Lola, Covered with Scars / Chain of Roses / Sleepless Nights / Intense Love, The Young Lions, Rock Your Fire	Shigeru Matsuzaki, Cho Yong-pil	Vicenary début anniversary
1994	Storm of Passion, Invited to Flamenco (Sasowarete Flamenco) / Lola, Covered with Scars, Green Apple (Aoi Ringo) / Blue Sky Blue, Intense Love, Young Man (Y.M.C.A.), Gyarandu, 240 Million Eyes (Ni Oku Yon Sen Man no Hitomi)	Goro Noguchi, Hiromi Go	Shin-Gosanke hit collection
1994	Intense Love, Trigger (Hikigane), Lola, Covered with Scars, Memory of Love (Ai no Memorī), So Many Stars Are Falling	Shigeru Matsuzaki, Masanori Sera	-
1995	Superstition, Jumpin' Jack Flash, Twilight, Stay by My Side	Marlene, THE Trouble	Collection of hit songs by artists visiting Japan
1996	What'd I Say, Proud Mary, Intense Love / Gyarandu, round'n'round	Akiko Wada, Millenium Eve	-
1997	Magical Mystery Tour, Day Tripper, Get Back, Parasite Love	Kyōko, Naomi Tamura, The KIX・S	Beatles medley
1999	LOVE Machine	Tsunku ♂	-
2000	Bailamos, Sunshine Day, Ai no Corrida	Enrique Iglesias, DA PUMP	-
2001	Jasmine, To A Distant Lover	Ryuichi Kawamura, Takako Uehara	-
2002	My Tears, They're Not Just for Decoration (Kazari ja Nai no yo Namida wa), Gyarandu, Funky Monkey Baby, Summer Happenings (BUT WE'RE PART NOW!）(Manatsu no Dekigoto), Everybody Dance	Yoshimi Tendo	Tricenary début anniversary
2003	G.I. Blues, Can't Help Falling in Love	Yūzō Kayama, Akiko Wada, Hound Dog, Martin Fontaine	Elvis Presley hit medley
2004	It Isn't a Large Pile of Rubbish, Sleepless Nights, Intense Love, Storm of Passion, Lola, Covered with Scars	Kiyoshi Hikawa	-

=== NHK Kōhaku Uta Gassen Appearances ===
#	Year	Iteration	Track list	Opponent	Entry order	Notes
1	1974	25th	Lola, Covered with Scars	Momoe Yamaguchi	1/25	Saijō's Kōhaku debut First time as top batter
2	1975	26th	White Chapel	Junko Sakurada	7/24	
3	1976	27th	The Young Lions	Akiko Wada	7/24	
4	1977	28th	Unbutton It	Candies	7/24	
5	1978	29th	Blue Sky Blue	Junko Sakurada	6/24	
6	1979	30th	YOUNG MAN (Y.M.C.A.)	Judy Ongg	10/23	
7	1980	31st	Santa Maria's Prayer	Yoshimi Iwasaki	5/23	
8	1981	32nd	Gypsy	Miyuki Kawanaka	7/22	
9	1982	33rd	Saint/Girl	Mizue Takada	4/22	
10	1983	34th	Gyarandu	Hiromi Iwasaki	1/21	Second time as top batter
11	1984	35th	The Jitterbug's Embrace -Careless Whisper-	Naoko Kawai	4/20	
12	1994	45th	YOUNG MAN (Y.M.C.A.) [2nd time]	Chisato Moritaka	14/25	Comeback appearance after 10 years
13	1995	46th	YOUNG MAN (Y.M.C.A.) [3rd time]	Mitsuko Nakamura	15/25	
14	1997	48th	moment	DREAMS COME TRUE	14/25	Comeback appearance after 2 years
15	1998	49th	Lola, Covered with Scars [2nd time]	Every Little Thing	7/25	
16	1999	50th	Bailamos 〜Tonight we dance〜	Mitsuko Nakamura	8/27	
17	2000	51st	Blue Sky Blue [2nd time]	Every Little Thing	10/28	
18	2001	52nd	Jasmine	Yoko Nagayama	11/27	Saijō's last Kōhaku appearance

=== Theatre ===
- Hanakosode Seiji (1989, Osaka Shin Kabukiza) *Starring role
- Tailor Ginji (1990, Osaka Shin Kabukiza) *Starring role
- Genroku/Abarenbo (1991, Osaka Shin Kabukiza) *Starring
- Kantaro Terauchi family (1999, Shinbashi Enbujo)

=== Musical Theatre ===
- The North Wall of My Youth (Shiki Theater Company, 1977, Nissay Theater) *Starring
  - Sakae Takita, Ayakiko Kuno, Retsuko Sugamoto, Kazuyo Mita
- Duet (Toho, 1984/1986, Nissay Theater) *Starring
  - Ran Otori, Takashi Ishimaru, Keiko Ono, Naoya Uchida, Takeo Seki, Takashi Nagi, Hitoshi Honma, Shigeo Matsuzawa, Reo Okawa, Mika Chiba, Eriko Suga, Mumiko Fujiwara
- Ryoma Sakamoto (1989, 1991, Shin-Kobe Oriental Theater, Nippon Seinenkan) *Starring role
  - Izumi Yukimura, Kenji Haga, Junichi Inoue
- Love (comedy, 1993/1996, Tokyo, Osaka, Nagoya, Sapporo) *Starring
  - Masachika Ichimura, Ran Otori
- Rock To The Future (Panasonic D・LIVE, 1996/1997, Akasaka BLITS) *Starring
  - Satoshi Hashimoto, Mika, Miyoko Yoshimoto, Yuki Kuroda, Onapets, DIAMOND YUKAI, Kyoko, Kanako Nakayama, SHIMA-CHANG, MITSUKO, Miki Nakayama, Sasumi Shiraishi
- New Enka no Hanamichi (2002, Shinjuku Koma Theater / Umeda Koma Theater)
  - Dan Nishikino, Naomi Kawashima, Tomomitsu Yamaguchi, Keishi Hirahata, Shiro Suzuki, Noriko Fujita, Sayaka Tsuruta, music producer Tsunku♂
- Legendary Stage FOREVER'70s-Seishun- (2003, Chunichi Theater, Shinjuku Koma Theater, Umeda Koma Theater)
  - Dan Nishikino, Masahiro Kuwana, Hanako Miyagawa, Kayo Asano, Yuta Yamazaki, Michi Taira, Jun Asaka
- Marguerite (March 17–28, 2011, Akasaka ACT Theater, April 6–10, Umeda Arts Theater Main Hall)
  - Norika Fujiwara, Mari Tashiro, Tsuyoshi Matsubara, Megumi Iino, Yuta Yamazaki, Tadashi Yokouchi

=== Radio ===
- Music Saturday ~ Youth Return Match ~ (TBS Radio, 1986)
- Every day is new, this is Hideki Saijō (TBS Radio, 1991)
- Hideki and Kozue's fun date (Nippon Cultural Broadcasting, October 1975 - March 1980) Kozue Saito
- Hideki and Kenbo's Oni-san (Click here for Cultural Broadcasting, April 1980 - March 1981)
- Hideki and Hiromi's Sunday Waiwai Hiroba (Natural Broadcasting Corporation, April 1981 - March 1982) Hiromi Ota
- Hideki Saijō's Raspberry Club (Nippon Cultural Broadcasting, 1984–1986)
- This is in front of Jogakuin Ijuin Yosaku's Maroha Gokigen! (Nippon Broadcasting System)

=== Advertising ===
- House Foods (from 1973 to 2002)
  - "Vermont Curry" Naoko Kawai
  - "Potato Chips" Kozue Saito, Junji Takada
  - "Granola Bar"
  - "Java curry"
  - "Delicious water of Rokko"
  - "Umaissho" (no appearances, only songs)
  - "Kakuya Curry Ramen/Curry Udon" Masahiro Kuwana
  - "Natural effects" (supplement food)
- Zojirushi Mahobin More Pot (1977)
- Hokuren Agricultural Cooperative Federation Milk (1986)
- Mondo Shoji (1988)
- National IH jar rice cooker (1993)
- sugar food
  - "Satou no Kagami-mochi"
- Yamahisa
  - "Petio"
- ECC Foreign Language School (1995)
- citizen watch
- HONDA
  - "LEAD SS"
- Seiyu
- biotech
- TV Shin Hiroshima (FNS affiliated TV station)
  - "Jonetsu Denpa TSS"
- Tokyo Telecommunications Network (TTNet)
  - "Tokyo Telephone"
  - "Tokyo Denwa Internet"
  - "Tokyo Denwa Astel"
- Yahoo! Mobage

=== Other ===
- "Kansai Yamamoto /Harumi Passion Nights" (Fashion Show) (July 6, 1982). Held at the Tokyo International Trade Fair Center (Harumi International Trade Center). appeared as a fashion model alongside film directors Nagisa Oshima and Ryudo Uzaki.
- National anthem solo
  - May 27, 2001, 68th Tokyo Yushun (Japan Derby), Tokyo Racecourse
  - August 18, 2004, "Kirin Challenge Cup" match against Argentina, Ecopa Stadium
- short film
  - In 2004, Satoshi Takagi's work, "DANCE MASTER~Dance! "Moulin Rouge Laughter Town~" Friendship appearance, role of Western Joe

== Publications ==
Please Note: This section is complete but not translated yet.

=== Books ===
- 誰も知らなかった西城秀樹。（ペップ出版(ワニブックス
- 君におくろう僕の愛を（ペップ出版、1976年）
- ふたりぼっちの日曜日・ヒデキとこず恵の楽しいデート（徳間書店、1976年） - 斎藤こず恵共
- いま、光の中で ー悩むな、つきすすめ、青春。. 明星デュエット・ブックスー03. 集英社. (1979)
- 熱き想いいつまでも. 日本文芸社. (1992). ISBN 978-4-537-02293-3
- バリスタイルの家 西城秀樹の快適アジアン生活のすすめ（イースト・プレス、2002年）
- あきらめない 脳梗塞からの挑戦（リベロ、2004年）
- ありのままに「三度目の人生」を生きる（廣済堂出版
- THE 45・西城秀樹デビュー45周年フォトエッセイ（清流出版、2016年) (2020年6月30日、電子書籍
- 西城秀樹 一生青春（青志社、2020年）
- 欲張らず七・五分でいこう（清流出版、2020年、電子書籍のみ)
- 誰も知らなかった西城秀樹。（青志社、2021年4月19日復刊）

==== Other Relevant Books ====
- 蒼い空へ － 夫・西城秀樹との18年 － 木本美紀・著（小学館、2018年11月 ISBN 978-4-09-388643-7

=== Serialisations ===
- のどもと過ぎれば・・・(産経新聞
- 秀樹とヒデキ(週刊朝日
- 欲張らず七・五分でいこう(清流出版
- ヒデキ!カンレキ!!(中日新聞2015年10月7日〜2016年9月21日、隔週水曜日、全25回)

=== Photobooks ===
- 西城秀樹 Young idol now『写真集』（勁文社、1974年）
- 西城秀樹写真集（さうんどぱわあ、1974年）
- 季刊ポッポ 75'WINTER 全特集・西城秀樹（新興楽譜出版、1975年）
- The Young Lion 西城秀樹『写真集』（レオ企画、1976年）
- HIDEKI（Wani Books、1980年）
- Hideki Saijo（株式会社シンコーミュージック、1981年）
- MY SELF PORTRAIT（近代映画社、1984年）
- 武藤義 撮影『Body: 西城秀樹写真集』ワニブックス、1986年10月10日。NDLJP:12721837。(要登録)
- H45・西城秀樹「独身最後の衝撃」（主婦と生活社、2001年）
- H45 2018 EDITION (青志社、2018年)
- HIDEKI FOREVER blue （集英社インターナショナル、2019年）
- HIDEKI FOREVER pop (集英社インターナショナル、2020年)上記写真集『HIDEKI FOREVER blue』のスピンオフ企画である。

== Awards ==
- 1973, 15th Japan Record Awards, Vocal Award
- 1974, 16th Japan Record Awards, Vocal Award
- 1976, 18th Japan Record Awards, Vocal Award
- 1978, 20th Japan Record Awards, Gold Award
- 1979, 21st Japan Record Awards, Gold Award
- 1980, 22nd Japan Record Awards, Gold Award
- 1981, 23rd Japan Record Awards, Gold Award
- 1982, 24th Japan Record Awards, Gold Award
- 1983, 25th Japan Record Awards, Gold Award
- 2018, 60th Japan Record Awards, Special Achievement Award
