= Kazune Kawahara =

Japanese manga artist (born 1972)

- Born: 河原 和音; 11 March 1972 (age 54); Takikawa, Hokkaido, Japan
- Occupation: Manga artist
- Known for: High School Debut

Kazune Kawahara (Japanese: 河原 和音, Hepburn: Kawahara Kazune) is a Japanese manga artist who is best known for creating the romantic comedy shōjo manga High School Debut (Koukou Debut). Kawahara has also published and authored several other manga series, most notably Ai no Tame ni and Aozora Yell, and mostly specialises in the genre of romance.

== Works ==
=== Manga ===
- Shiawase no Kanzume – 1 volume, 1993
- Tensei – 1 volume, 1993
- Nakitaku Nattara Oshiete ne – 1 volume, 1995
- 500 Mile – 1 volume, 1996
- Shuugaku Ryokou – 1 volume, 1996
- Sensei! – 20 volumes, 1996–2007 - adapted to a live action film My Teacher in 2017
- Platinum Snow – 1 volume, 2000
- Ai no Tame ni – 1 volume, 2002
- High School Debut (Koukou Debut) – 13 volumes, 2003–2008 - adapted to a live action film in 2011
- Aozora Yell – 19 volumes, 2008–2015 - adapted to a live action film in 2016
- Enren Debut – 2009 (oneshot, sequel of Koukou Debut)
- The Secret of Friendship (Tomodachi no Hanashi) – 1 volume, 2010
- My Love Story!! (Ore Monogatari!!) – 13 volumes, 2011–2016
- Mayuge no Kakudo wa 45° de – 2013 (one-shot, crossover of Aozora Yell and Karuho Shiina's Kimi ni Todoke)
- Suteki na Kareshi – 14 volumes, 2016–2020
- A Star Brighter Than the Sun – 14 volumes, 2021–present

=== Adaptation for comics ===
- Muteki no Love Power – 1 volume, 2005
- Kimi ga Sukida Kara!! – 1 volume, 2005
- Koukou Debut – re-released, 8 volumes, 2012

=== Light novels ===
Kawahara's series has also been adapted as a collection of six light novels written by Yuu Kuramoto (倉本 由布) and illustrated by Kazune Kawahara. They were published by Shueisha under its Cobalt imprint starting in June 2007.

1. High School Debut (高校デビュー, Kōkō Debyū), published 28 June 2007 (ISBN 978-4-08-601047-4)
2. High School Debut: (高校デビュー 好きになっちゃいけないひと!, Kōkō Debyū Suki ni Natchaikenai Hito!), published 1 August 2007 (ISBN 978-4-08-601060-3)
3. High School Debut: Christmas Battle! (高校デビュー クリスマス大作戦!, Kōkō Debyū Kurisumasu Daisakusen!), published 1 November 2007 (ISBN 978-4-08-601097-9)
4. High School Debut: Be Careful with Love Consultations! (高校デビュー 恋の相談にご用心!, Kōkō Debyū Koi no Sōdan ni Goyōjin!), published 26 December 2007 (ISBN 978-4-08-601120-4)
5. High School Debut: Mass-Generated Love Troubles? (高校デビュー 恋のトラブル、大量発生!?, Kōkō Debyū Koi no Toraburu, Tairyō Hassei!?), published 1 April 2008 (ISBN 978-4-08-601154-9)
6. (高校デビュー 恋の告白されちゃいましたっ!?, Kōkō Debyū Koi no Kokuhaku Sarechaimashita!?), published 2 September 2008 (ISBN 978-4-08-601212-6) - This is an original story, and not an adaptation.
