= Yell for the Blue Sky (manga) =

Japanese manga series

- Cover of volume one

青空エール (Aozora Ēru)
- Genre: Romance music Coming-of-age; Sports
- Manga
- Written by: Kazune Kawahara
- Published by: Shueisha
- English publisher: Shueisha (digital)
- Magazine: Bessatsu Margaret
- Original run: August 11, 2008 – October 13, 2015
- Volumes: 19
- Live-action film
- Yell for the Blue Sky (2016)

Yell for the Blue Sky (青空エール, Aozora Ēru) is a Japanese romance shōjo manga series written and illustrated by Kazune Kawahara. Published by Shueisha, it was serialized on Bessatsu Margaret from August 11, 2008, to October 13, 2015, and was compiled into nineteen volumes. It is published in French by Panini Comics. A live action film adaptation of the same name was released in Japan on August 20, 2016.

Shueisha began publishing the manga in English on its Manga Million platform in 2026.

== Volumes ==
Volume	Release date	Oricon	Copies	Refs.
1	December 25, 2008	29	96,358	
2	March 25, 2009	9	96,033	
3	July 24, 2009	9	87,223	
4	February 25, 2010	14	91,888	
5	July 23, 2010	8	90,863	
6	December 24, 2010	22	103,238	
7	July 25, 2011	9	97,852	
8	November 25, 2011	20	80,038	
9	March 23, 2012	15	85,670	
10	July 25, 2012			
11	November 22, 2012	24	80,963	
12	March 25, 2013	9	66,656	
13	August 23, 2013	28	88,310	
14	December 25, 2013	16	89,220	
15	April 25, 2014	20	78,767	
16	August 25, 2014	12	71,923	
17	January 23, 2015	12	78,279	
18	June 25, 2015	17	75,031	
19	January 25, 2016	6	81,309	

== Reception ==
The manga has sold over 3.9 million copies.
