= Suteki na Kareshi =

Japanese manga series

- First tankōbon volume cover

素敵な彼氏
- Genre: Romantic comedy
- Manga
- Written by: Kazune Kawahara
- Published by: Shueisha
- Imprint: Margaret Comics
- Magazine: Bessatsu Margaret
- Original run: January 13, 2016 – October 13, 2020
- Volumes: 14

Suteki na Kareshi (Japanese: 素敵な彼氏; "Where's My Lovely Sweetheart?") is a Japanese manga series written and illustrated by Kazune Kawahara. It was serialized in Shueisha's Bessatsu Margaret magazine from January 2016 to October 2020, with its chapters collected into fourteen tankōbon volumes.

The series won the 64th Shogakukan Manga Award in the shōjo category in 2019.

== Publication ==
Written and illustrated by Kazune Kawahara, Suteki na Kareshi began serialization in Shueisha's shōjo manga magazine Bessatsu Margaret on January 13, 2016. In July 2017, an extra chapter was published in Betsuma Spin-off, a supplementary magazine of Bessatsu Margaret. The series ended its serialization on October 13, 2020. Shueisha collected the manga's chapters into fourteen tankōbon volumes, published from May 2016 to November 2020.

=== Volumes ===
No.	Japanese release date	Japanese ISBN
1	May 25, 2016	978-4-08-845589-1
2	September 23, 2016	978-4-08-845640-9
3	February 24, 2017	978-4-08-845720-8
4	June 23, 2017	978-4-08-845775-8
5	October 25, 2017	978-4-08-845838-0
6	February 23, 2018	978-4-08-845892-2
7	June 25, 2018	978-4-08-844056-9
8	November 22, 2018	978-4-08-844124-5
9	February 25, 2019	978-4-08-844173-3
10	July 25, 2019	978-4-08-844223-5
11	November 25, 2019	978-4-08-844265-5
12	March 25, 2020	978-4-08-844315-7
13	July 22, 2020	978-4-08-844361-4
14	November 25, 2020	978-4-08-844425-3

== Reception ==
By December 2020, Suteki na Kareshi had over three million copies in circulation.

The series ranked 17th in the 2017 edition of Takarajimasha's Kono Manga ga Sugoi! list of best manga for female readers. In 2018, it was nominated at the 42nd Kodansha Manga Award in the shōjo category. The following year, the series won the 64th Shogakukan Manga Award in the same category.
