= Ai to Makoto =

Japanese manga series and its adaptations

- Cover of the first volume of the 2001 Kodansha Manga Bunko edition

愛と誠
- Manga
- Written by: Ikki Kajiwara
- Illustrated by: Takumi Nagayasu
- Published by: Kodansha
- Magazine: Weekly Shōnen Magazine
- Original run: 1973 – 1976
- Volumes: 16
- Audio drama
- Station: Nippon Broadcasting System
- Original run: April 8, 1974 – October 8, 1974
- Live-action film
- Directed by: Shigeyuki Yamane
- Released: July 13, 1974
- Runtime: 89 minutes
- Television drama
- Studio: Tokyo Channel 12; Tokyo Movie
- Original network: Tokyo Channel 12
- Original run: October 4, 1974 – March 28, 1975
- Episodes: 26
- Live-action film

Zoku Ai to Makoto
- Directed by: Shigeyuki Yamane
- Released: March 15, 1975
- Runtime: 91 minutes
- Live-action film

Ai to Makoto Kanketsu-hen
- Directed by: Hideo Nanbu
- Released: September 23, 1976
- Runtime: 91 minutes
- Live-action film

Ai to Makoto
- Directed by: Takashi Miike
- Studio: Kadokawa Pictures, Toei Company
- Released: May 2012

Ai to Makoto (愛と誠; tran. Love and Truth) is a Japanese manga series written by Ikki Kajiwara and illustrated by Takumi Nagayasu. It was adapted into a live-action television series in 1974 and into four live-action films in 1974, 1975, 1976 and 2012.

== Plot ==
Makoto Taiga is a young delinquent that Ai Saotome happens to meet in the Tateshina Highlands of Shinshu. When he was young, he saved Ai's life but got a scar on his forehead and destroyed his parents and life in the process. As compensation, he is transfers to a high school in Tokyo to rehabilitate, but he is angry at having been hurt and plots to rule the school with violence. However, Ai's actions prevent him from doing so, he transfers to Hanazono Jitsugyuō, the most delinquent high school in the Kantō region. Ai and Hiroshi Iwashimizu, a man who loves and supports her from the shadows, also transfer to the school. There is a confrontation between Yuki Takahara, who rules the school, Gonta Zaō, and Shun Sadoya. Sadoya is defeated by Makoto, determined to sacrifice his life to reunite with his mother who abandoned him. Ai's father is then embroiled in a corruption scandal and arrested, and her mother returns to her family home and finds herself in a predicament. Makoto, who sets out to solve the case alone, beats up the masterminds of the case. Eventually, the prosecutors arrest the prime minister who was responsible. Sadoya appears with a knife and stabs Makoto, who drags his injured body to the beach were Ai waits. Their short-lived happiness with each other comes to an end.

== Characters ==
Makoto Taiga (太賀 誠, Taiga Makoto)
Portrayed by: Hideki Saijo (1974 film), Kōji Nanjō (1975 film), Ryū Kanō (1976 film), Satoshi Tsumabuki (2012 film)
High school delinquent. When he was young, he saved the life of a kindergartener named Ai, which left a crescent-shaped scar on his forehead. He spent nearly a year in the hospital and was held back. Feeling indebted to the wound, he develops a violent personality, and his parents eventually divorce due to family discord. After spending his time fighting as a gangster and boss of the local delinquents, he is fatefully reunited with Ai. Afterwards, according to Ai's wishes, the Saotome family becomes his guardian, and he is transferred to Aobadai Academy, the same prestigious school as Ai, but in order to make her experience the pain of the scar on his forehead, he purposely creates problems.
Ai Saotome (早乙女 愛, Saotome Ai)
Portrayed by: Ai Saotome (1974, 1975, and 1976 films), Emi Takei (2012 film)
Bourgeois daughter of the Saotome financial conglomerate. She is talented and good at sports; she is the captain of both the women's volleyball and gymnastics clubs. She is hailed as the school's bright star and angel at Aobadai Academy. When she was young, Makoto saved her life, and she has since regarded him as a "knight on a white horse" but feels deep pain for the hurt she caused him. Learning of his situation, she has him transferred to her school to rehabilitate, but the damage he suffered is far beyond her imagination. When Makoto causes trouble at Aobadai, her reputation plummets, but she believes in the conscience within Makoto. She decides to continue to love him and make amends.
Hiroshi Iwashimizu (岩清水 弘, Iwashimizu Hiroshi)
Portrayed by: Masami Naka (1974 film), Yoshirō Uchida (1976 film), Takumi Saitoh (2012 film)
Ai's classmate and class representative. Although he is reserved and shy, he has deep feelings for Ai. Even when Ai was in a predicament at school because of Makoto, he is strict, honest, and showed understanding, sometimes offering advice, and took action according to Ai's safety.
Shōgo Saotome (早乙女 将吾, Saotome Shōgo)
Portrayed by: Jun Negami (1976 film), Masachika Ichimura (2012 film)
Ai's father and the head of the Saotome financial conglomerate. He is the president of Aobadai's PTA, and at Ai's request, arranges for Makoto to be transferred from juvenile prison to Aobadai. He is well-versed in politics and business.
Miyako Saotome (早乙女 美也子, Saotome Miyako)
Portrayed by: Mari Shiraki (1976 film), Yo Hitoto (2012 film)
Ai's mother. She acts like a noblewoman, and even her husband cannot stand up to her, but is respected and feared by the school. She is frighteningly intuitive, has a strong temper, and is proud, but has a habit of returning to her parents' home when she is in trouble or suffers emotional shock.
Yuki Takahara (高原 由紀, Takahara Yuki)
Portrayed by: Yumi Takigawa (1975 film), Ito Ohno (2012 film)
Second-year student at Hanazono Business High School and shadow leader of the Hanazono Sukeban group. She is the adopted daughter of the leader of the Takahara-gumi, a gang that controls the Shinjuku area. She is usually a literary beauty who carries around Turgenev's First Love but is also a queen-like figure who rules over the Garden of Evil. She is a master knife thrower.
Gonda Zaō (座王 権太, Zaō Gonda)
Portrayed by: Takayuki Chida (1975 and 1976 films), Tsuyoshi Ihara (2012 film)
Third-year student at Hanazono Business High School and shadow principal of the school. He is the only son of Yohei Zaō, the mastermind behind the political and business world. He is a bodyguard who has feelings for Yuki Takahara. A man of great strength, he is usually timid, but if he is in a bad mood, he is a dangerous existence that rampages like a human typhoon. His mother, who was pregnant before his birth, was shot by a bullet from a killer aiming for Yohei, which caused his intellectual development to be delayed and he still suffers from intellectual disability.
Yohei Zaō (座王 与平, Zaō Yohei)
Portrayed by: Hideji Ōtaki (1976 film)
Gonda's father and a right-wing boss said to be the mastermind who controls the political and business worlds from the shadow. He is the president of Hanazono High School's PTA and dotes on his only son Gonda. He is usually gentle but sometimes has a violent temper.
Shun Sadoya (砂土谷 峻, Sadoya Shun)
Portrayed by: Toshiyo Shiba (1976 film)
Leader of Shinjuku Young Mafia Hizakura Group, whose purpose is to take over the Garden of Evil. He is a devilish genius when it comes to using a whip, and is called a ruthless, computer-equipped devil with no humanity. He ruthlessly punishes his subordinates who fail in their mission and shows no mercy to those who divulge the existence and purpose of the Hizakura Group.

== Media ==
=== TV series ===
==== Cast ====
- Yūsuke Natsu
- Kimiko Ikegami
- Hisayuki Nakajima
- Sei Hiraizumi

=== Film ===
==== 1974 film ====
A film adaptation directed by Shigeyuki Yamane and starring Hideki Saijo, Ai Saotome, and Masami Naka was released in July 1974. Saijo negotiated directly with Ikki Kajiwara, the author of the original work, to receive the role. However, fans of the work sent letters to Kajiwara and Weekly Shōnen Magaziner rejecting Saijo, who was at the peak of his popularity, saying that Ai to Makoto should not be a singer's work and it would ruin the work's image. The staff also had difficulty casting an actress to play Ai Saotome because all actresses refused for reasons such as not wanting to antagonize Saijo's fans; they then had an open call for the role. Ai Saotome, who used the heroine's name as her stage name, got the role. The film was a box office success and grossed ¥900 million.

==== 1975 film ====
A second film adaptation again directed by Shigeyuki Yamane and starring Kōji Nanjō as Makoto and Ai Saotome as Ai Saotome, reprising her role from the first film, was released in March 1975. Initially planned to again star Saijo and Saotome and release during Golden Week, due to scheduling conflicts, they re-cast the role of Makoto with an open call, with Nanjō winning the part. Due to Saotome's school commitments, filming took place over 23 days. Yamane complained about the schedule, saying that he was overworked, and the prioritizing of the schedule ruined his work. It was more violent and an extreme delinquent film.

==== 1976 film ====
A third film adaptation directed by Hideo Nambu starring Ryū Kanō as Makoto and Ai Saotome as Ai Saotome, reprising her role from the previous two films, was released in September 1976. It became an unusual series with more delinquency in each installment along with the involvement political masterminds.

==== 2012 film ====
The 2012 film version, directed by Takashi Miike, was alternatively titled For Love's Sake in English. This time, it is done in the form of an experimental musical film similar to Bollywood, with song numbers to highlight the story further

The basic plotline sees a cross-class love story between Ai (Emi Takei), the daughter of a well-respected Tokyo family, and delinquent Makoto (Satoshi Tsumabuki) who is seeking the leader of a female gang.

== Reception ==
Manga artists Hirohiko Araki and Tetsuo Hara have both cited Ai to Makoto as an influence, with the latter crediting it with bringing gekiga to "its peak".
