= High School Debut (film) =

- Film poster
- Kanji: 高校デビュー
- Revised Hepburn: Kōkō Debyū
- Directed by: Tsutomu Hanabusa
- Written by: Yuichi Fukuda
- Based on: High School Debut by Kazune Kawahara
- Produced by: Masao Toshima; Masako Yamada
- Starring: Junpei Mizobata; Ito Ohno; Masaki Suda
- Cinematography: Nobunari Fujimoto
- Edited by: Ryūji Miyajima
- Music by: Masaru Yokoyama; Kei Yoshikawa
- Production companies: Happinet; Shueisha; Hakuhodo; Sony Music Entertainment Japan; KDDI; Yahoo Japan; Toei Tokyo; Ozone Network
- Distributed by: Asmik Ace Entertainment
- Release date: 1 April 2011 (Japan)
- Running time: 93 minutes
- Country: Japan
- Language: Japanese
- Box office: $3,242,697

High School Debut (Japanese: 高校デビュー, Hepburn: Kōkō Debyū) is a 2011 Japanese film directed by Tsutomu Hanabusa and based on the manga of the same name. It was released in cinemas in Japan on 1 April 2011.

== Cast ==
- Junpei Mizobata as Yoh Komiyama
- Ito Ohno as Haruna Nagashima
- Masaki Suda as Fumiya Tamura
- Rina Aizawa as Asami Komiyama
- Yuki Furukawa as Yui Asaoka
- Sae Miyazawa as Mami Takahashi
- Rei Okamoto as Makoto Kurihara
- Yuka Masuda as Leona Matsuzaka
- Elaiza Ikeda as Takemoto
- Tsukaji Muga as Tsukaxile
- Yoichi Nukumizu as teacher

== Film Festivals ==
This film was featured in the 3rd Okinawa International Movie Festival in the "Laughs" category.

== Theme song ==
The theme song of the film High School Debut is "Fall in Love", by the band 7!! (pronounced "Seven Oops"). This is the first major label debut by this Okinawan band, which was founded in 2004. This song was released as a digital single on RecoChoku on 1 April 2011. It was ranked 1st in terms of download on the RecoChoku weekly download charts that was announced on 6 April 2011. The singles version of this song was subsequently released by Epic Records Japan on 13 April 2011.

7!! also performed a cover of the 1998 song "Ai no Shirushi" by Puffy. This song was used as an insert song in this film.

== See also ==
- High School Debut, the manga on which the film was based
