= For Love's Sake =

- Third Window Films DVD cover
- Directed by: Takashi Miike
- Screenplay by: Takayuki Takuma
- Based on: Ai to Makoto by Ikki Kajiwara & Takumi Nagayasu
- Starring: Satoshi Tsumabuki; Emi Takei
- Cinematography: Nobuyasu Kita
- Edited by: Kenji Yamashita
- Music by: Takeshi Kobayashi
- Production companies: Concept Film; Excellent Film; Kadokawa Pictures; Oriental Light and Magic
- Distributed by: Toei Company; Kadokawa Pictures
- Release date: May 21, 2012 (Cannes Film Festival)
- Running time: 133 minutes
- Country: Japan
- Language: Japanese

For Love's Sake (愛と誠, Ai to Makoto) is a 2012 Japanese experimental musical romance film directed by Takashi Miike based on the manga series Ai to Makoto by Ikki Kajiwara and Takumi Nagayasu. It premiered at the Cannes Film Festival on May 21, 2012, where it was presented out of competition. Previous adaptations of the manga series had been titled Love and Truth in English but this 2012 film version was alternatively titled For Love's Sake in English.

== Plot ==
The film begins with a brief animated prologue set in 1961 in which Ai (Emi Takei), the daughter of a well-respected Tokyo family, is skiing down a snowy hill and crashes into young Makoto (Satoshi Tsumabuki). 11 years later in Tokyo in 1972, Ai is a senior in high school when Makoto shows up and is attacked by a local Tokyo gang of boys. Makoto fights them off single-handed during the film's first musical number, setting the style for the rest of the film. Ai jumps in to stop the fighting and Makoto recognizes her as the one who injured him and gave him a large scar on his forehead as a child. The police arrive and immediately recognize Ai as the daughter of a wealthy family while arresting all of the boys including Makoto, who is to be sent to a reform school. He is moments away from being attacked by a gang upon his arrival when he is informed that the Saotame family has arranged for his release and transfer to the prestigious Aobadai Prep School, where Ai is a popular student at the top of her class in academics and sports. Ai finds herself interested in Makoto and has convinced her family to sponsor him. The film follows the relationship between the delinquent Makoto and the privileged schoolgirl Ai.
Iwashimizu, president of the student council, is in love with Ai. Iwashimizu shows Makoto that Ai has been breaking school rules working part-time dancing at a club and Makoto attempts to blackmail her parents for 1 million yen. They have him expelled from school and sent to Hanazono Trade School to be with his "own kind". Gum-ko and Yuki, a member and leader of a gang of girls at the trade school, become interested in Makoto.

== Cast ==
- Satoshi Tsumabuki as Makoto Taiga
- Emi Takei as Ai Saotome
- Takumi Saito as Hiroshi Iwashimizu
- Ito Ohno as Yuki Takahara
- Masachika Ichimura as Shogo Saotome
- Yo Hitoto as Miyako Saotome
- Kimiko Yo as Toyo Taiga
- Seishiro Kato as Makoto Taiga
- Sakura Andō as Gum-ko
- Tsuyoshi Ihara as Kenta Zaô

== Production ==
Filming took place in the Japanese locations of Odawara, Shibuya-ku, Shinjuku, Tochigi, and Toshima.

== Reception ==
The Hollywood Reporter gave the film a moderately negative review, calling it overly long and characterizing the choreography and songs as simplistic, though praising the actors.

Allan Hunter of ScreenDaily.com wrote that "there is only so much fun to be had from watching people being repeatedly whacked over the head or endlessly punched in the face."
