= High School Debut =

Japanese manga series

- English cover of the first manga volume

高校デビュー (Kōkō Debut)
- Genre: Romance
- Manga
- Written by: Kazune Kawahara
- Published by: Shueisha
- English publisher: NA: Viz Media
- Magazine: Bessatsu Margaret
- Original run: 2003 – August 2008
- Volumes: 13
- Live-action film
- Directed by: Tsutomu Hanabusa
- Written by: Yuichi Fukuda
- Music by: Masaru Yokoyama; Kei Yoshikawa
- Released: 1 April 2011
- Runtime: 93 minutes

High School Debut (Japanese: 高校デビュー, Hepburn: Kōkō Debyū) is a shōjo romance manga by Kazune Kawahara (河原 和音, Kawahara Kazune). It was serialized in Japan by Shueisha in Bessatsu Margaret from 2003 to 2008 and collected in 13 bound volumes. The series was adapted as a drama CD, a series of six light novels written by Yū Kuramoto, and a 2011 live-action film. The manga is licensed in North America by Viz Media, which published English editions of all 13 volumes between January 2008 and February 2010.

The series follows the relationship between Haruna Nagashima, an enthusiastic former softball star, and Yoh Komiyama, the cool boy she convinces to coach her in romance. It has been praised by reviewers as a standard shōjo manga premise made highly entertaining by Kawahara's handling of the characters, particularly the romantic leads, and artwork.

== Plot ==
Haruna Nagashima gave her all to softball in middle school, now that she has made her high school debut, she has decided to give her all for a new goal: getting a boyfriend and falling in love. However, she has one small problem—since she never paid any attention to fashion or trends in middle school, she has no idea how to go about attracting her yet-to-be-found love. But a chance encounter with the popular Yoh Komiyama provides her with the opportunity she needs. If he coaches her in how to become attractive, surely she can find herself a boyfriend. He agrees to coach Haruna after her great persistence but on one condition: she mustn't fall in love with him. However she does end up falling in love with him and Yoh reciprocated those feelings back. Throughout their relationship they have to overcome several obstacles, such as the return of Yoh's ex-girlfriend, Haruna's several male admirers and a stalker who is very keen on breaking them up as she believes Haruna is not adequate. Although despite the obstacles, they are still deeply in love each other. In the final chapter Yoh had to move in order to attend university and they are still happily maintaining their long-distance relationship after he did so.

== Main characters ==
Haruna Nagashima (長嶋 晴菜, Nagashima Haruna)
A high school girl who played softball and was devoted to manga in middle school. She is known to be a very dense person, a personality similar to Yoh's friend Fumi. Shortly after entering high school, she becomes determined to find a boyfriend under the influence of all the shōjo manga she reads. She accidentally meets Yoh after a failed attempt at being "picked up" by guys. Shortly after that, she finds out Yoh goes to the same high school as Haruna and asks him to coach her on how to be attractive. After being rejected, she meets Asami, Yoh's sister and they become friends. Soon, Yoh reluctantly accepts to be Haruna's coach with one condition – she is not to fall in love with him. Yoh helps her daily with clothes and such, and gives her advice on what to do when she falls in love with one of Yoh's friends. Haruna can be described as simple-minded and doesn't seem to pay much attention to her surroundings, though she is very kind hearted and cannot refuse anyone who needs help. Her friend once stated that she is "pure-hearted to the point of being scary". She eventually ends up liking Yoh and they go out.
Yoh Komiyama (小宮山 ヨウ, Komiyama Yō)
A good looking boy who's in the grade above Haruna. He knows the ideas on how to impress men from a woman's point of view. Although a little shy and easily embarrassed, he represents a figure of cool demeanor, he was confessed to by most of the girls in his class. In the beginning when Haruna asked him to tutor her about profession in boyfriend-making he warned her not to fall in love with him or cry around him. Until she confesses to him one night while acting strange and he agrees to go out with her, they become a couple and face many trials but they never break up.
Asami Komiyama (小宮山 麻美, Komiyama Asami)
Yoh's little sister. Although she's pretty and admired by many boys, she often shows her conceited side. She has a serious brother complex. She wants Yoh and Haruna to be together, but she sometimes tries to protect her older brother when she thinks Haruna is trying to get to Yoh sexually. Often, when Haruna goes to her when she's having a problem, Asami says it's going to be "fun" but quickly replaces it with "trouble". She likes Fumiya but wants to test him to see if he would wait forever in the snow for her. Haruna helped her notice how kind Fumiya was, and they have been going out. She gets angry at Fumiya when he didn't take any notice of her, even when she tried her cute poses. She has a mischievous side which can cause others trouble. Yoh once accused her of being "mischievous and evil." Her response was "No, I'm just mischievous."
Fumiya Tamura (田村 史也, Tamura Fumiya)
Yoh's friend, also known as "Fumi". He's a bit on the slow side, not getting some things straight they are right before his eyes. His caring demeanor was turns vicious when women and children are being bullied or harassed. His nickname is "Sleeping Bear" which was given to him when he used to do judo.
Yui Asaoka (朝丘 唯, Asaoka Yui)
Yoh's friend. He has a part-time job at a restaurant and, like Fumiya, he is calm and caring (fortunately, he has some common sense and is not as dense as Fumiya). Yoh says that ninety percent of what Asaoka says is out of kindness and that whoever goes out with him would be happy because of all the kind words he says. He once went on a date with Haruna to make Yoh jealous. When Yoh finally appears at the date Yui tells her that he was acting. He hides his true feelings in jokes, but when Mami tells him "You're always deceiving yourself by passing things off as a joke, so...now you don't even know yourself what your true feelings are." After that he told Haruna that he likes her, but she thought that he just was acting.
Mami Takahashi (高橋 真巳, Takahashi Mami)
Haruna's best friend since middle school. She is notably calm and collected, being able to read Haruna like an open book. Their friendship is close and Haruna has described how Mami first became her friend by helping her with her pitching. She has a part-time job at a video rental shop and was the captain of their middle-school softball team. Haruna often has a very high opinion of Mami believing that she is 'amazing.' She describes Mami as kind, clever and calm, which is often replied to by the statement that Mami is a 'nice girl' or a 'good girl'. It has been revealed that Mami really values her friendship with Haruna, even going to the extent of saying that she 'betrayed' Haruna for not believing and trusting in Haruna's pitch, which had lost them a game in third year.
Mami has proven at several times that she is highly perceptive, especially concerning Haruna. Haruna, in turn, demonstrates her affection for Mami by trying to help her find her own love.

== Media ==
=== Manga ===
High School Debut was written and illustrated by Kazune Kawahara. It was serialized in Japan by Shueisha in the shōjo (aimed at teenage girls) manga magazine Bessatsu Margaret between 2003 and August 2008. The 52 untitled chapters were collected in 13 tankōbon volumes. It is published in North America by Viz Media under the Shojo Beat label, with all 13 volumes published in English. It is also published in Italy by Star Comics and in Korea.

Two sequel short stories called "Enren Debut" ("Long-Distance Love Debut"), set in the months after the conclusion of the series, were published in the March and May 2009 issues of Deluxe Margaret.

In March 2011, a new volume of the series was released – "Far Love Edition" or "Love Edition – Far High School Debut" – issued 25 March 2011. This sequel of October 2013, already published two volumes, including this. Another volume 15 issued 25 July 2013 called "Far Love Knitting" was released.

No.	Original release date	Original ISBN	North America release date	North America ISBN
1	25 March 2004	978-4-08-847728-2	1 January 2008	978-1-4215-1481-9
Chapters 1–4
2	23 July 2004	978-4-08-847765-7	4 March 2008	978-1-4215-1482-6
Chapters 5–8
3	25 March 2005	978-4-08-847837-1	6 May 2008	978-1-4215-1483-3
Chapters 9–12
4	25 May 2005	978-4-08-847858-6	1 July 2008	978-1-4215-1731-5
Chapters 13–16
5	25 January 2006	978-4-08-846025-3	2 September 2008	978-1-4215-1732-2
Chapters 17–20
6	25 April 2006	978-4-08-846051-2	4 November 2008	978-1-4215-1733-9
Chapters 21–24
7	24 November 2006	978-4-08-846118-2	6 January 2009	978-1-4215-2189-3
Chapters 25–28
8	23 March 2007	978-4-08-846156-4	3 March 2009	978-1-4215-2190-9
Chapters 29–32
9	25 July 2007	978-4-08-846195-3	5 May 2009	978-1-4215-2191-6
Chapters 33–36
10	25 December 2007	978-4-08-846249-3	7 July 2009	978-1-4215-2665-2
Chapters 37–40
11	25 April 2008	978-4-08-846287-5	1 September 2009	978-1-4215-2666-9
Chapters 41–44
12	25 August 2008	978-4-08-846325-4	3 November 2009	978-1-4215-2922-6
Chapters 45–48
13	25 December 2008	978-4-08-846367-4	2 February 2010	978-1-4215-3129-8
Chapters 49–52
14	25 March 2011	978-4-08-846634-7	3 February 2015	978-1-4215-6626-9
Chapters {?}
15	25 July 2013	978-4-08-845075-9	3 February 2015	978-1-4215-6626-9
Chapters {?}

=== Drama CD ===
The series has been adapted as a drama CD released 10 June 2005. Cast:

- Haruna Nagashima: Junko Noda
- Yoh Komiyama: Hikaru Midorikawa
- Asami Komiyama: Rika Komatsu
- Mami Takahashi: Sayaka Ohara
- Fumiya Tamura: Katsuyuki Konishi
- Asaoka Yui: Akira Sasanuma

=== Light novels ===
The series has also been adapted as a series of six light novels written by Yū Kuramoto (倉本 由布) and illustrated by Kazune Kawahara. They were published by Shueisha under its Cobalt imprint starting in June 2007.

1. High School Debut (高校デビュー, Kōkō Debyū), published 28 June 2007 (ISBN 978-4-08-601047-4)
2. High School Debut: (高校デビュー 好きになっちゃいけないひと!, Kōkō Debyū Suki ni Natchaikenai Hito!), published 1 August 2007 (ISBN 978-4-08-601060-3)
3. High School Debut: Christmas Battle! (高校デビュー クリスマス大作戦!, Kōkō Debyū Kurisumasu Daisakusen!), published 1 November 2007 (ISBN 978-4-08-601097-9)
4. High School Debut: Be Careful with Love Consultations! (高校デビュー 恋の相談にご用心!, Kōkō Debyū Koi no Sōdan ni Goyōjin!), published 26 December 2007 (ISBN 978-4-08-601120-4)
5. High School Debut: Mass-Generated Love Troubles? (高校デビュー 恋のトラブル、大量発生!?, Kōkō Debyū Koi no Toraburu, Tairyō Hassei!?), published 1 April 2008 (ISBN 978-4-08-601154-9)
6. (高校デビュー 恋の告白されちゃいましたっ!?, Kōkō Debyū Koi no Kokuhaku Sarechaimashita!?), published 2 September 2008 (ISBN 978-4-08-601212-6) – This is an original story, and not an adaptation.

=== Live-action film ===
A live action movie starring Ito Ohno and Junpei Mizobata was released on 1 April 2011. Filming began in October 2010.

== Reception ==
High School Debut was among the best-selling manga in Japan during publication. Volumes 9, 10, and 11 reached number 2 on the Tohan best-seller list, and volumes 12 and 13 both debuted at number 3. Volume 13 was the 34th best-selling manga volume in the six months before 17 May 2009, selling over 360,000 copies. About.com's Deb Aoki lists High School Debut as the best shōjo manga of 2008.

Volumes one and two of the English edition were named as two of the Great Graphic Novels for Teens of 2008 by YALSA. A reviewer at About.com named the English translation a favorite new manga of 2008, calling it "well-crafted and lovable"; a reviewer from PopCultureShock similarly described it as a series that "just make[s] you happy". School Library Journal described the series as "standard fair for younger manga readers" and "a good purchase for schools and libraries." Joanna Draper at Comics Worth Reading called it her "favorite shojo series running" for being entertaining and inventive. Otaku USA criticized the first volume for the predictability of the story.

Kawahara's art was praised for its clean style and layout, dynamic figures, and emotional expressions, and was compared by one reviewer to Yoko Kamio's. Reviewers consistently hailed Haruna as a comic heroine and a key to the series' appeal, but Kawahara's handling of the other chararacters was also praised, particularly with Yoh and his sister Asami. They also praised Haruna's relationship with Yoh, which is presented as a pairing of friends and equals. Some critics noted that the story's initial makeover theme was more deftly handled than a short summary led them to expect, though some still expressed reservations about it.
