= Ito Ohno =

Japanese actress and fashion model (born 1995)

- 大野 いと
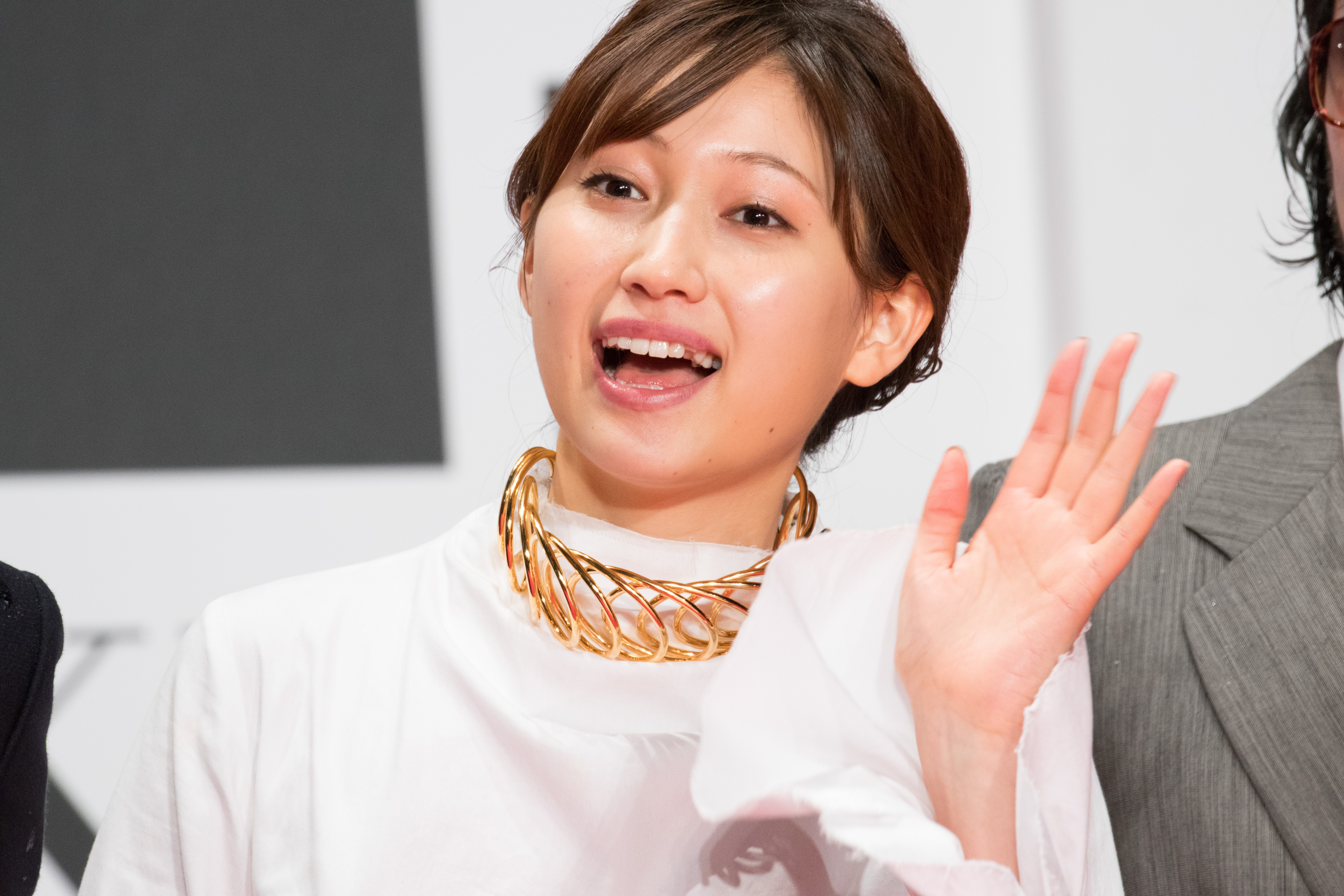
- Ohno at the Tokyo International Film Festival in 2016
- Born: 2 July 1995 (age 30); Nakama, Fukuoka, Japan
- Occupations: Model; actress
- Years active: 2009–present
- Style: Fashion
- Height: 1.68 m (5 ft 6 in)

Ito Ohno (大野 いと, Ōno Ito; born 2 July 1995 in Nakama, Fukuoka, Japan) is a Japanese actress and fashion model. She is represented with Horipro.

== Videography ==
=== Videos ===
Year	Title	Link
2011	Gekkan Neo Movie: Ito Ohno	Amazon Japan

== Filmography ==
=== TV drama ===
Year	Title	Role	Network	Notes	Ref.
2011	Kōkōsei Restaurant	Kayo Hoshino	NTV		
2011	Nankyoku Tairiku	Mitsuko Inuzuka	TBS		
2012	Saiko no Jinsei	Momoko Ihara	TBS		
2012	Kuro no Jokyōshi	Asuka Shimamura	TBS		
2012	Keigo Higashino Mysteries	Reiko Yamashita	Fuji TV	Episode 4	
2013	Strawberry Night After the Invisible Rain: Tokyo	Miyoko Tada	Fuji TV		
2013	Neo Ultra Q	Michiru Yashiro	WOWOW	Episode 10	
2013	Amachan	Mana Endo	NHK	Weeks 13 to 25	
2013	Yamada-kun and the Seven Witches	Nene Odagiri	Fuji TV		
2014	Kindaichi Shōnen no Jikenbo N	Miho Shiraishi	NTV	Episodes 3 and 4	
2014	Watashitachi ga Propose sa Renai no ni wa, 101 no Riyū ga atteda na	Mayumi	LaLa TV	Episode 6	
2015	Hotel Concierge	Ai "Meg" Kobayakawa	TBS	Episode 9 and Final Episode	
2015	Mago Senpai no Iu Tōri	Mago	Fuji TV	Lead role	
2016	Dame na Watashi ni Koishite Kudasai	Aya Tanno	TBS		
2022	Invisible	Toko Anno	TBS		

=== Internet drama ===
Year	Title	Role	Website
2011	High School Debut: Debut Chokuzen Shūchū Kōza	Harena Nagashima	Lismo Channel

=== Films ===
Year	Title	Role	Notes	Ref.
2011	High School Debut	Harena Nagashima	Lead role	
2012	Ai to Makoto	Yuki Takahara		
2012	Ai Ore!	Mizuki Sakurazaka	Lead role	
2012	Tsunagu	Natsu Misono		
2014	Idainaru, shurarabon	Satsuki Hayami		
2014	Live	Rumi Murota	Lead role	
2015	Chasuke's Journey	Yuri		
2015	Wasure Yuki	Miyuki		
2016	Ame ni yureru Onna	Satomi		
2017	Ani ni Aisaresugite Komattemasu	Chiyuki Mioka		
2018	Akuma			
2019	Tokyo Wine Party People			
2022	Takatsu-gawa			

=== Stage ===
Year	Title	Role	Ref.
2016	Rai-ō no Terrace	Kunumu Muramusume	
2016	Reizōko no ue no Jinsei	Musume	

=== Advertisements ===
Year	Title
2010	Ezaki Glico Nihon Ōdan Glico Wagon
2012	NHK Kōkyō Hōsō Spot
2012	Procter & Gamble Pantene
2014	Marvelous AQL Story of Seasons

=== Advertising ===
Year	Title	Ref.
2012	91st All Japan High School Soccer Tournament Eighth Support Manager	
2013	Parco Summer Campaign Model	

=== Newspapers ===
Year	Title
2012	Asahi Shimbun "TV Face: Hito ga Ōkute Naremasen"

== Bibliography ==
=== Photo albums ===
Year	Title	Ref.
2011	Gekkan Neo Movie: Ito Ohno	
2012	Ito	
2015	dear	

=== Magazines ===
Year	Title	Notes
2010	Seventeen	Exclusive model
