= Kimi ga Saigo ni Nokoshita Uta =

2020 Japanese novel by Ichijō Misaki

- Author: Ichijō Misaki
- Original title: 君が最後に遺した歌
- Language: Japanese
- Genre: Romance novel
- Publisher: Kadokawa Corporation
- Publication date: December 25, 2020
- Media type: Print (paperback)
- Pages: 288
- ISBN: 9784049133332

Kimi ga Saigo ni Nokoshita Uta (君が最後に遺した歌) is a Japanese romance novel written by Ichijō Misaki. It was published by Kadokawa Corporation under their Media Works Bunko imprint on December 25, 2020.

The story follows a high school student who writes poetry and a girl with developmental dyslexia but exceptional musical talent, as they bond through songwriting and navigate love and hardship.

The novel was adapted into a live-action film released on March 20, 2026.

== Plot ==
Haruto Mizushima, a second-year high school student, secretly enjoys writing poetry, which he considers a gloomy hobby. After losing his parents in an accident during childhood, he lives with his grandparents.

One day, while submitting a piece for a literary contest, his poem is read aloud by a teacher and overheard by his classmate Ayane Tōsaka. Moved by his words, Ayane asks him to write lyrics for her, and the two begin collaborating on songs in an abandoned clubroom after school.

Haruto gradually learns that Ayane has developmental dyslexia, yet possesses remarkable talent in composition and singing. As they continue creating music together, they grow closer and develop romantic feelings for each other.

As their music gains attention, they face social pressure and isolation. Ayane eventually passes an audition and moves to Tokyo to pursue her debut, leading to a temporary separation.

Years later, they reunite at a concert and confess their feelings. However, Ayane is soon diagnosed with a serious illness with limited life expectancy.

In her final days, the two marry and have a daughter, Haruka. After Ayane's passing, her music and hopes live on through their child.

== Characters ==
=== Main characters ===
- Haruto Mizushima – A high school student who writes poetry.
- Ayane Tōsaka – A girl with developmental dyslexia and exceptional musical talent.

=== Supporting characters ===
- Masafumi Tōsaka – Ayane's uncle who supports her musical career.
- Ken (ケン) – A band member who assists Ayane.
- Haruka Mizushima – The daughter of Haruto and Ayane.

== Film adaptation ==
A live-action film adaptation titled The Last Song You Left Behind was released on March 20, 2026. The film was produced by the same team behind the 2022 hit Even If This Love Disappears From the World Tonight, including director Takahiro Miki and music producer Seiji Kameda.

The film stars Shunsuke Michieda as Haruto Mizushima and Meru Nukumi as Ayane Tōsaka. Nukumi reportedly underwent a year of vocal and guitar training to prepare for her role as a musically gifted heroine with dyslexia.

== Publication ==
- Ichijō Misaki. 君が最後に遺した歌. KADOKAWA, December 25, 2020. ISBN 9784049133332.
