= Takahiro Miki =

Japanese film, television and music video director

- Born: August 29, 1974 (age 51); Tokushima, Japan
- Occupations: Film director, television director, music video director
- Years active: 1998–present

Takahiro Miki (三木孝浩, Miki Takahiro) is a Japanese film, television and music video director.

== Works ==
=== Films ===
Year	Title	Main cast	Notes
2010	Solanin	Aoi Miyazaki, Kengo Kora	
2011	Control Tower	Kento Yamazaki, Ai Hashimoto	
2012	We Were There: First Love	Toma Ikuta, Yuriko Yoshitaka	
2012	We Were There: True Love	Toma Ikuta, Yuriko Yoshitaka	
2013	Girl in the Sunny Place	Jun Matsumoto, Juri Ueno	
2014	Hot Road	Rena Nōnen, Hiroomi Tosaka	
2014	Blue Spring Ride	Tsubasa Honda, Masahiro Higashide	
2015	Have a Song on Your Lips	Yui Aragaki	
2016	Yell for the Blue Sky	Tao Tsuchiya, Ryoma Takeuchi	
2016	My Tomorrow, Your Yesterday	Sota Fukushi, Nana Komatsu	
2017	My Teacher	Toma Ikuta, Suzu Hirose	
2018	Kids on the Slope	Yuri Chinen, Taishi Nakagawa, Nana Komatsu	
2019	Fortuna's Eye	Ryunosuke Kamiki, Kasumi Arimura	
2020	Love Me, Love Me Not	Minami Hamabe, Takumi Kitamura, Riko Fukumoto, Eiji Akaso	
2020	Your Eyes Tell	Yuriko Yoshitaka, Ryusei Yokohama	
2021	The Door into Summer	Kento Yamazaki, Kaya Kiyohara	
2022	Tang and Me	Kazunari Ninomiya	
2022	Akira and Akira	Ryoma Takeuchi, Ryusei Yokohama	
2022	Even If This Love Disappears From the World Tonight	Shunsuke Michieda, Riko Fukumoto	
2024	Drawing Closer	Ren Nagase, Natsuki Deguchi	
2025	My Beloved Stranger	Kento Nakajima, Milet	
2026	Until We Meet Again	Minami Hamabe, Ren Meguro	
2026	The Last Song You Left Behind	Shunsuke Michieda, Meru Nukumi	

=== TV series ===
- Dragon Seinendan (2012)
- Irodorihimura (2012, episode 4)
- My Undead Yokai Girlfriend (2024)

=== Music videos ===
- "Tomorrow's Way"
- "Life"
- "Tokyo"
- "Rolling Star"
- "Cherry"
- "LOVE & TRUTH (Movie Ver.)"
- "Namidairo"
- "Hana no Uta"

=== Other ===
- Happy! School Days! (web, 2010, episode 2 Hello Goodbye)
