= The Last Song You Left Behind =

2026 Japanese romantic drama film

- Theatrical release poster
- 君が最後に遺した歌
- Directed by: Takahiro Miki
- Screenplay by: Tomoko Yoshida
- Based on: 君が最後に遺した歌 by Misaki Ichijō
- Produced by: Kazuaki Kishida
- Starring: Shunsuke Michieda; Meru Nukumi
- Music by: Seiji Kameda
- Production company: Toho Studios
- Distributed by: Toho
- Release date: March 20, 2026 (Japan)
- Running time: 117 minutes
- Country: Japan
- Language: Japanese

The Last Song You Left Behind (君が最後に遺した歌, Kimi ga Saigo ni Nokoshita Uta) is a 2026 Japanese romantic drama film directed by Takahiro Miki, based on the novel of the same name by Misaki Ichijō.

The film stars Shunsuke Michieda and Meru Nukumi, following a ten-year love story between a boy who writes poetry and a girl with dyslexia who possesses exceptional musical talent.

== Plot ==
Haruto Mizushima, a high school student who secretly enjoys writing poetry, lives a quiet life with his grandparents after losing his parents at a young age. One day, his classmate Ayane Toosaka discovers his poems and asks him to write lyrics for her.

Ayane, who has developmental dyslexia and struggles with reading and writing, possesses a remarkable talent for composing and singing. As they begin creating music together after school, the two gradually develop a deep emotional connection.

As their music gains attention, they face social pressure and personal struggles. Ayane eventually passes an audition and moves to Tokyo to pursue her musical career, leading to a temporary separation.

Years later, the two reunite and confess their feelings. However, Ayane is diagnosed with a serious illness and has limited time to live. During her remaining days, they marry and have a daughter. Ayane ultimately leaves behind a song that symbolizes hope, which continues to live on through her child.

== Cast ==
=== Main characters ===
- Shunsuke Michieda as Haruto Mizushima, a high school student who secretly enjoys writing poetry. He collaborates with Ayane by writing lyrics for her songs.
- Meru Nukumi as Ayane Toosaka (later Ayane Mizushima), a girl with developmental dyslexia who struggles with reading and writing but possesses exceptional talent in singing and composing.

=== Family ===
- Yoshiko Miyazaki as Takuko Mizushima, Haruto's grandmother, who warmly supports him.
- Takeo Gozu as Reishi Mizushima, Haruto's grandfather, a traditional brush craftsman.
- Masato Hagiwara as Masafumi Okuda, Ayane's uncle, who runs a restaurant and supports her musical activities.

=== School ===
- Pistol Takehara as Tomoichi Fujita, Haruto's Japanese teacher who encourages him to submit his poetry to a contest.
- Sora Inoue as Toshiya Kanzaki, a classmate who later becomes a singer and helps reconnect Haruto and Ayane.
- Momoko Tanabe as Minori Hiiragi, Toshiya's girlfriend in adulthood and a fan of Ayane.

=== Others ===
- Shinji Niiro as Ken, a guitarist in Masafumi's band who has watched over Ayane since childhood.
- Toru Nomaguchi as a police officer who has known Ayane and Masafumi for many years.
- Kouki Okada as a music producer who recognizes Ayane's talent early on.

== Production ==
The film reunites the creative team behind Even If This Love Disappears From the World Tonight (2022), including director Takahiro Miki and music producer Seiji Kameda.

Meru Nukumi underwent approximately one year of vocal and guitar training to portray her role.

== Release ==
The film was released in Japan on March 20, 2026.

It was subsequently released in South Korea on April 1, 2026.

Advance screenings were also held in South Korea on March 20, 2026, coinciding with its Japanese premiere.

== Music ==
The film's music was produced by Seiji Kameda, a prominent Japanese music producer and member of Tokyo Jihen.

Songs featured in the film are performed under the name "Ayane", portrayed by Meru Nukumi, who underwent extensive vocal and guitar training for the role.

The original soundtrack, titled The Last Song You Left Behind Original Soundtrack, was released by Avex Trax and made available on major streaming platforms.

== Reception ==
=== Box office ===
The film had a strong opening in Japan, grossing over ¥170 million and attracting more than 130,000 viewers within its first three days of release.

Japanese media also reported that the film achieved a notable box office performance during its theatrical run.

=== International release ===
The film was released internationally, including in South Korea, reflecting the growing popularity of Japanese romantic films in the region.

== Filming locations ==
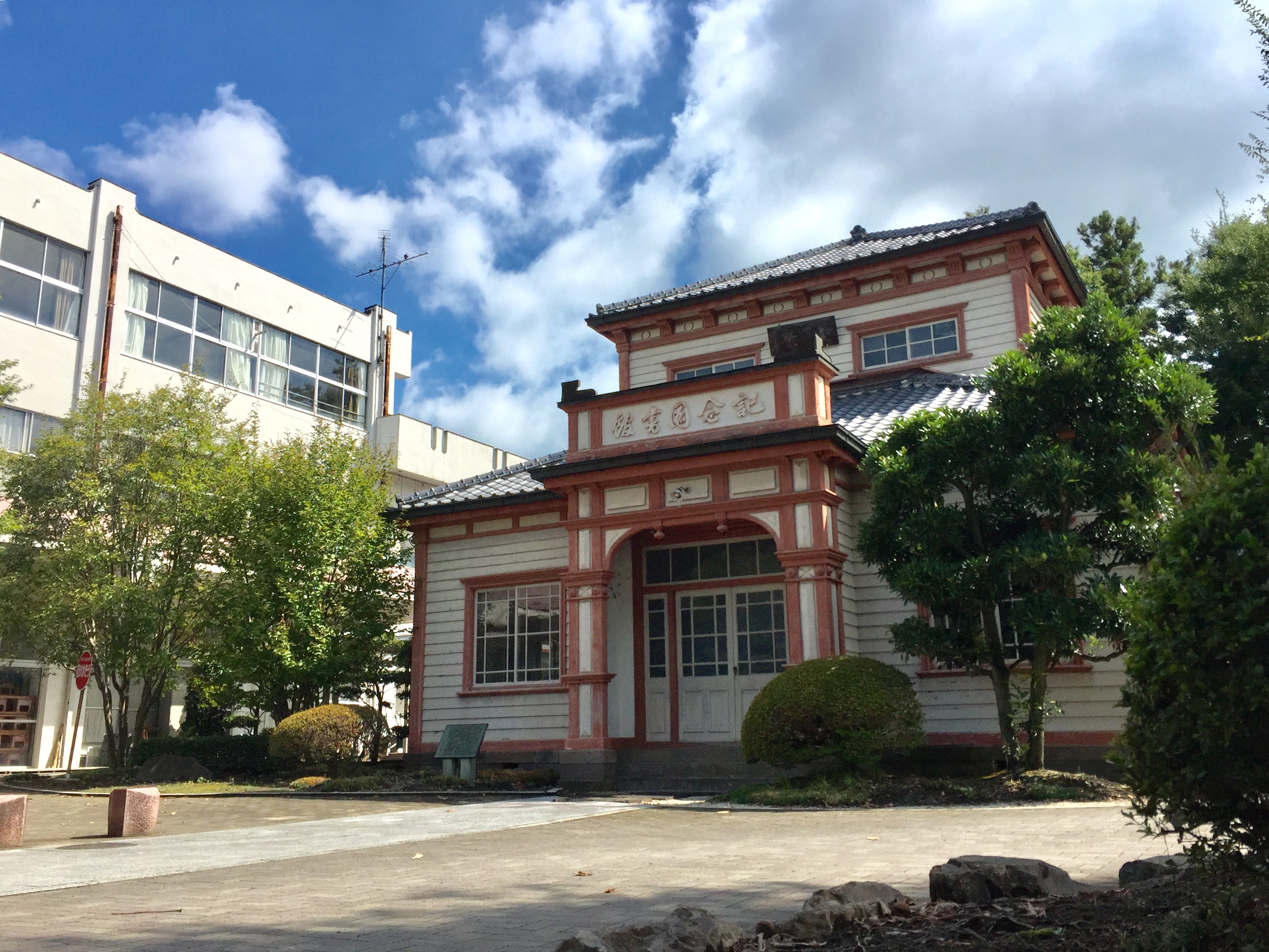
Tochigi High School Memorial Library (Yōseiryo) (Used as the literature club room on the second floor in the film (Note: Only the exterior of the building was used for filming; interior scenes such as the clubroom were shot on a studio set.))

The film was shot in several locations across Japan, particularly in Aichi, Tochigi, and Gunma Prefectures. Filming also took place in locations used to depict both the characters' hometown and urban settings.

=== Aichi Prefecture ===
- Toyohashi City:
  - Toyohashi Station (east exit pedestrian deck), where Ayane performs a street live concert
  - Azumada-Sakaue tram stop, where Ayane waits for a train after leaving the clubroom
- Gamagōri City:
  - Gamagori City Hall, used for scenes depicting Haruto's workplace
  - Laguna Ten Bosch, where Haruto buys a bracelet and later reunites with Ayane on a Ferris wheel
  - Takeshima Park, where the two compose and perform music outdoors
  - Hoshigoe Coast, where Ayane reveals her illness
- Chita City:
  - Okada district, used as the residential area of the Mizushima family

=== Tochigi Prefecture ===
- Tochigi City:
  - Tochigi Prefectural Tochigi High School, used as the setting for Seihō High School. The memorial library building appears as the literature club room (exterior only)

=== Gunma Prefecture ===
- Maebashi City:
  - PISMO CAFE Maebashi, used as the restaurant "Trattoria MASA"
