= Seiji Fukushi =

Japanese actor (born 1983)

- 福士 誠治
- Born: June 3, 1983 (age 43); Kanagawa Prefecture, Japan
- Occupation: Actor
- Years active: 2001–present
- Agents: Imai Office (until 2015); Owlm
- Website: Official website

Seiji Fukushi (福士 誠治, Fukushi Seiji; born 3 June 1983, in Kanagawa Prefecture, Japan) is a Japanese actor represented by Owlm. He was a member of Imai Office until 31 March 2015.

== Biography ==
Fukushi auditioned and debuted in the Mizkan advertisement "Kin no Tsubu" in 2001. His drama debut was in the Fuji Television drama The Long Love Letter in 2002 and his first lead role was in 19borders in 2004. In 2005 Fukushi appeared in the Tokyo Broadcasting System Ai no Gekijō series Teisō Mondō. He played Tatsuhiko Matsui in the Asadora series Junjō Kitari. Fukushi auditioned twice for the series and he was given the role of the protagonist on the third time. He later opened an official blog in February 2006.

Fukushi's first terrestrial drama was on the NHK drama Otokomae! which also ran a sequel. In December 2008, he, along with Koichi Otake, Takumi Saito, and Kazuki Namioka, formed the theater unit Run. It was announced on 1 April 2015 that Fukushi, with Tetsu Watanabe and Masaki Sawai, moved to Owlm.

== Filmography ==
=== Television ===
Year	Title	Role	Notes	Ref.
2008–09	Otokomae!	Itsuma Todo	Lead role; 2 seasons	
2021	Reach Beyond the Blue Sky	Inoue Kaoru	Taiga drama	
2022	Minato's Laundromat	Takayuki Sakuma		
2025	Shiawase wa Tabete Nete Mate	Keiichirō Tō		
2026	Blood and Sweat	Seiichi Suzumiya	Finnish-Japanese drama	

=== Films ===
Year	Title	Role	Notes	Ref.
2021	Janitor	Fukami	Lead role	
2024	A Conviction of Marriage	Sakurai		
2024	Bibalam	Minato Nagiri	Lead role	
2026	Our Journey for 50 Years			
2026	The Honest Realtor: The Movie			

=== Stage ===
Year	Title	Role	Notes	Ref.
2015	Super Kabuki II One Piece	Ace		
2016	Hotel California	Shinozaki	Lead role	
