= Kazuaki Kishida =

Japanese film producer (born 1991)

- 岸田 一晃
- Kishida at the 2026 New York Film Festival
- Born: February 25, 1991 (age 35); Osaka, Japan
- Occupations: Film producer, planner
- Years active: 2013–present
- Employer: Toho

Kazuaki Kishida (岸田 一晃, Kishida Kazuaki; born February 25, 1991) is a Japanese film producer. His credits include Over Drive (2018), Even if This Love Disappears from the World Tonight (2022), Godzilla Minus One (2023), The Last Song You Left Behind, and Godzilla Minus Zero (both 2026).

== Life and career ==
Kazuaki Kishida was born on February 25, 1991, in Osaka Prefecture, Japan. In 2013, he began his career in film upon joining Toho, working as an assistant before ascending to the producer role.

He has since produced films including Over Drive (2018), Love Me, Love Me Not (2020), Black Night Parade (2022), Even if This Love Disappears from the World Tonight (2022), Godzilla Minus One (2023), Dear Family (2024), The Last Song You Left Behind (2026), and Godzilla Minus Zero (2026).

== Filmography ==
- Let Me Eat Your Pancreas (2017)
- Over Drive (2018) - producer
- You Shine in the Moonlight (2019) - planner/producer
- The Great War of Archimedes (2019)
- I Have Loved you for 30 Years, Yayoi (2020) - producer
- Love Me, Love Me Not (2020) - producer
- Ghost Book (2022) - producer
- Black Night Parade (2022) - planner/producer
- Even if This Love Disappears from the World Tonight (2022) - planner/producer
- Godzilla Minus One (2023) - planner/producer [with Minami Ichikawa, Keiichiro Moriya, and Kenji Yamada]
- Dear Family (2024) - planner/producer
- The Last Song You Left Behind (2026) - planner/producer
- Godzilla Minus Zero (2026) - producer

== Awards ==
- Fujimoto Awards - Won the Fujimoto Award for Godzilla Minus One [with Hisashi Usui, Shuji Abe, Kenji Yamada, Gō Abe, and Keiichirō Moriya]
