= Sho Nishigaki =

Japanese actor (born 1999)

- Born: Shoichiro Nishigaki; May 26, 1999 (age 27); Hakusan, Ishikawa, Japan
- Education: Keio University
- Occupation: Actor
- Years active: 2021–present
- Agent: Toho Entertainment

Japanese name
- Kanji: 西垣 匠
- Hiragana: にしがき しょう
Transcriptions
- Romanization: Shō Nishigaki

Shoichiro Nishigaki (西垣 匠一郎; born May 26, 1999) better known by the stagename Sho Nishigaki (西垣 匠), is a Japanese actor. He is managed by the talent agency Toho Entertainment.

== Career ==
In 2019, during Nishigaki's second year at university, a friend suggested that he compete in the 'Mister Keio Contest'. He managed to place first and win the grand prize. After that, he was scouted by several entertainment agencies. However, since he knew nothing about acting at the time, he only took their business cards but declined their offers.

However, later on, Nishigaki became interested in the idea of possibly appearing on television and decided to take professional acting lessons as a trainee at an entertainment agency for a year, but unfortunately, he was unsuccessful in getting any roles.

After Nishigaki was unable to land any roles and was about to refrain from pursuing his aspirations in acting, he was scouted by his current manager and he was signed with Toho Entertainment.

In 2021, Nishigaki made his acting debut in the live-action television adaptation of the manga Captivated, by You.

== Filmography ==
=== Film ===
Year	Title	Role	Notes	Ref.
2022	Even If This Love Disappears From the World Tonight	Saegusa		
2022	Akira and Akira	Ono		
2023	As Long as We Both Shall Live	Shuuta Okabe		
2023	Godzilla Minus One	Cameo		(Note: Had a minor uncredited role)
2024	My Home Hero	Enoki		
2024	Everyone is an Alien	Shou		
2024	6 Lying University Students	Ryo Hakamada		
2025	Stella Next to Me	Rio Shindo		
2025	Romantic Killer			
2026	Until We Meet Again	Shoichi Nagano		
2026	Sonic Beat	Isao	Lead role	
2026	Blue Lock	Asahi Naruhaya		
2026	The Honest Realtor: The Movie			
2026	Echoes of Kiriko	Shingo Higashiyama		
2027	Leviathan	Yotsu Shikata		
2027	The Day We Embraced the Universe			

=== Television drama ===
Year	Title	Role	Notes	Ref.
2021	Captivated, by You	Masahiro Seno		
2021	Dragon Zakura	Yoshinobu Iwai	Season 2	
2021	My Love Mix-Up!	Taishō Nakabayashi		
2022	Rokuhōdō Yotsuiro Biyori	Hanaoka Chitose		
2022–23	Minato's Laundromat	Shintaro Kazuki	2 seasons	
2023	The Woman Who Wants to Kick a Man Who is Addicted to Her	Naoki Takeda		
2023	Shall We Have a Toast For Now	Haruto		
2023	Me and My Boy	Morio Kiritani		
2023	Grandma's Melancholy	Tatsuya Morita	Episode 1	
2023	Pending Train	Tatsumi Kakogawa	Episode 4–9	
2023	Don't Waste Your Time, Lovers	Hirose Wataru	Episode 6	
2023	Shall We have a Toast for Now?: Men with no Hope	Haruto	Episode 1; web series	
2024	I Still Want to Dream	Kanata	Web series	
2024	When Spring Comes	Ken Kurosawa		
2024	Mars	Genki Sawai		
2024	What to Do on Saturday!?	Kotone Fujii (voice)	Lead	
2024	Diary of a Woman with a Reason	Takashi Naito		
2024	Make Up with Mud	Yuuki		
2024	Diamonds Sleeping in the Sea	Light		
2024	Hello, Nice to Meet You, Please Divorce Me	Shohei Amamiya		
2025	Zaibatsu Fukushu: To My Ex-Wife Who Became My Brother's Wife	Reo Satake		
2025	Honest Real Estate	Leon Hyodo		
2025	Apollo's Song	Shimoda		
2025	The World is Made of Elements	Calcium		
2025	Second to Last Love	Yuto Kimura	Season 2	
2025	The Final Rondo: To You Whom I Can Never Meet Again	Ryota Kimura		
2026	Heartbreak Karuta	Hikari Maji	Lead role	
2026	Too Many Loves and Murders	Soma Kuroiwa		

== Bibliography ==
=== Photo book ===
- "Takumi Sho" (September 29, 2023, Shufu to Seikatsusha)

=== Calendar ===
- "Sho Nishigaki Calendar 2026–2027" (March 27, 2026, Shogakukan )
