= Over Drive (film) =

2018 Japanese film

- Theatrical release poster
- Directed by: Eiichirō Hasumi
- Written by: Sayaka Kuwamura
- Produced by: Noriaki Kuramoto; Kenzo Ishiguro; Satoshi Suzuki; Kazuaki Kishida; Atsushi Furuya
- Starring: Masahiro Higashide; Mackenyu Arata; Aoi Morikawa; Takumi Kitamura; Keita Machida; Jun Kaname; Kōtarō Yoshida
- Cinematography: Shinya Kimura
- Edited by: Hiroshi Matsuo
- Music by: Naoki Satō
- Production company: Robot Communications
- Distributed by: Toho
- Release date: June 1, 2018 (Japan)
- Running time: 104 minutes
- Country: Japan
- Language: Japanese

Over Drive is a 2018 Japanese sports drama film directed by Eiichirō Hasumi. The film stars Masahiro Higashide, Mackenyu Arata, Aoi Morikawa, Takumi Kitamura, Keita Machida, Jun Kaname and Kōtarō Yoshida.

== Cast ==
- Masahiro Higashide as Atsuhiro Hiyama
  - Yuito Obara as Young Atsuhiro Hiyama
- Mackenyu Arata as Naozumi Hiyama
- Aoi Morikawa as Hikaru Endo
- Takumi Kitamura as Akira Shinkai
- Keita Machida as Junpei Masuda
- Jun Kaname as Hisatoshi Kagawa
- Kōtarō Yoshida as Issei Tsuzuki
- Maxwell Powers as The Race Announcer

== Awards and nominations ==
| Award | Category | Recipient(s) | Result | Ref |
|---|---|---|---|---|
| 40th Yokohama Film Festival | Best Actor | Masahiro Higashide | Won | |
| 2018 Tama Cinema Award | Best Actor | Masahiro Higashide | Won | |
