= Gazing at the Star Next Door =

Japanese manga series

- First tankōbon volume cover

隣のステラ (Tonari no Sutera)
- Genre: Romance
- Manga
- Written by: Ammitsu
- Published by: Kodansha
- English publisher: NA: Kodansha USA
- Imprint: Kodansha Comics Betsufure
- Magazine: Bessatsu Friend
- Original run: January 13, 2022 – present
- Volumes: 10
- Live-action film
- Directed by: Hana Matsumoto
- Written by: Sawako Kawamitsu
- Studio: Toho
- Released: August 22, 2025
- Runtime: 109 minutes
- icon

Gazing at the Star Next Door (Japanese: 隣のステラ, Hepburn: Tonari no Sutera), also known as Stella Next to Me, is a Japanese manga series written and illustrated by Ammitsu. It began serialization in Kodansha's shōjo manga magazine Bessatsu Friend in January 2022. A live-action film adaptation premiered in Japanese theaters in August 2025.

== Synopsis ==
Chiaki Amano has long held romantic feelings for her childhood friend Subaru Hiiragi. Her problem is that Subaru has gotten into acting, and is becoming progressively famous, making her want to abandon said feelings. However, due to how close they often are she still clings on to these feelings for Subaru.

== Characters ==
Chiaki Amano (天野千明, Amano Chiaki)
Portrayed by: Riko Fukumoto
Subaru Hiiragi (柊木昴, Hiiragi Subaru)
Portrayed by: Yusei Yagi
Yūdai Takahashi (高橋雄大, Takahashi Yūdai)
Portrayed by: Yuki Kura
Hazuki Shinohara (篠原葉月, Shinohara Hazuki)
Portrayed by: Mayuu Yokota
Rio Shindō (新堂理生, Shindō Rio)
Portrayed by: Sho Nishigaki
Haruna Kondō (近藤はるな, Kondō Haruna)
Portrayed by: Ririka Tanabe
Chie Amano (天野千絵, Amano Chie)
Portrayed by: Misa Shimizu
Mitsuhiro Amano (天野光博, Amano Mitsuhiro)
Portrayed by: Tomu Miyazaki
Tōko Hiiragi (柊木透子, Hiiragi Tōko)
Portrayed by: Mahiru Konno
Ritsuko Koyanagi (小柳律子, Koyanagi Ritsuko)
Portrayed by: Maho Nonami
Hiroshi Tanase (棚瀬浩, Koyanagi Ritsuko)
Portrayed by: Kenta Hamano

== Media ==
=== Manga ===
Written and illustrated by Ammitsu, Gazing at the Star Next Door began serialization in Kodansha's shōjo manga magazine Bessatsu Friend on January 13, 2022. Its chapters have been compiled into ten tankōbon volumes as of August 2026.

During their panel at Anime Expo 2023, Kodansha USA announced that they had licensed the series for English publication.

No.	Original release date	Original ISBN	North American release date	North American ISBN
1	May 13, 2022	978-4-06-527833-8	February 6, 2024	979-8-88877-182-2
1. "My Childhood Friend, the Star"; 2. "Pancakes and Chocolate Terrine"; 3. "Personal Photographer"; Ran the Peerless Beauty Special Short: "Ran and Candytufts"
2	October 13, 2022	978-4-06-529361-4	May 14, 2024	979-8-88877-183-9
4. "Love Beyond Control"; 5. "Big, Exciting News"; 6. "Don't Love Him Anymore"; 7. "Going on Set"
3	March 13, 2023	978-4-06-530948-3	August 13, 2024	979-8-88877-184-6
8. "Test Prep and Autographs"; 9. "Overflowing Emotion"; 10. "Subaru's Reply"; 11. "Broken Hearts and Caretaking"
4	August 10, 2023	978-4-06-532080-8	January 28, 2025	979-8-88877-207-2
12. "Misplaced Frustration and the Sea Breeze"; 13. "Forget It All"; 14. "Reconciliation and Subaru's Feelings"; 15. "Guiding Star"
5	February 13, 2024	978-4-06-534467-5	March 25, 2025	979-8-88877-332-1
16. "Sparkle"; 17. "For Chi, My Friend"; 18. "Ticklish Days"; 19. "World-Class Date"
6	July 11, 2024	978-4-06-536186-3	July 15, 2025	979-8-88877-470-0
20. "Like a Dream"; 21. "Spilled Secrets"; 22. "Sparkles, Then Sparks"; 23. "A Girlfriend's Pride"
7	December 13, 2024	978-4-06-537801-4	November 18, 2025	979-8-88877-576-9
24. "Date Mission"; 25. "Ten-Second Pout"; 26. "The Efficacy of a Hickey"; 27. "A Great, Big Triangle"
8	July 11, 2025	978-4-06-540052-4	May 12, 2026	979-8-88877-809-8
28. "Spark"; 29. "Ignition"; 30. "Starless Night"; 31. "Daybreak"
9	December 12, 2025	978-4-06-541718-8	November 24, 2026	979-8-88877-989-7
10	August 12, 2026	978-4-06-544507-5	—	—

=== Live-action film ===
A live-action film adaptation was announced on December 12, 2024. The film was directed by Hana Matsumoto from a screenplay by Sawako Kawamitsu. It premiered in Japanese theaters on August 22, 2025. The film's theme song is "Itsumo Tonari de" (Always By My Side) performed by Fantastics from Exile Tribe.

== Reception ==
The series was nominated for the 49th Kodansha Manga Award in the shōjo category in 2025. It was nominated for the 50th edition in the same category in 2026.
