= Riko Fukumoto =

Japanese actress and voice actress (born 2000)

- Born: November 25, 2000 (age 25); Osaka Prefecture, Japan
- Occupations: Actress; voice actress
- Years active: 2017–present
- Agent: Toho Entertainment
- Notable work: Love Me, Love Me Not; A Girl & Her Guard Dog; Even if This Love Disappears From the World Tonight

Japanese name
- Kanji: 福本莉子
- Hiragana: ふくもと りこ
Transcriptions
- Romanization: Riko Fukumoto

Riko Fukumoto (福本 莉子(ふくもと りこ), Fukumoto Riko; born November 25, 2000) is a Japanese actress and voice actress. Her most notable works to date as the lead actress are Love Me, Love Me Not, Even if This Love Disappears From the World Tonight, and A Girl & Her Guard Dog.

== Career ==
Riko Fukumoto was born on November 25, 2000 in Osaka Prefecture. She has been attending university since April 2019.

She began her career in 2016 by winning the Grand Prix at the 8th Toho Cinderella Audition, as well as being awarded a modeling contract by the women's fashion magazine Seventeen sponsored by Shueisha.

In January 2017, Fukumoto made her first television appearance as a guest in the information variety show Nijiiro Jean. Later in November, she published her first photobook intitled First Lover.

Fukumoto made her debut as a singer with the song "The Girl Who Crosses That Sky", the theme song for the TV anime series Dragon Pilot: Hisone and Masotan where she also voiced the character Natsume Misumi, the show began airing on April 12, 2018. She made her on-screen debut in the historical comedy film Flea-Picking Samurai, released on May 18 of the same year. In June, she played her first lead role as Kiki in the musical stage play Kiki's Delivery Service. In May of the same year, she made her television debut in the drama, The Confidence Man JP.

On August 14, 2020, Fukumoto starred alongside Takumi Kitamura in the coming of age film Love Me, Love Me Not, she also had a voice cameo as Ayuko in the anime adaptation of the manga of the same name. In October of the same year, Fukumoto starred in her first terrestrial television drama series, Escape from the Historical Labyrinth: Real Escape Game x TV Tokyo.

Fukumoto landed her first lead role in a film in the movie Muscat of Happiness, which was released in May 2021.

== Filmography ==
=== Film ===
| Year | Title | Role | Notes | Ref. |
|---|---|---|---|---|
| 2018 | Flea-picking Samurai | Omitsu | | |
| 2018 | My Teacher, My Love | Natsuho | | |
| 2019 | Murder at Shijinso | Reika Hoshikawa | | |
| 2020 | Love Me, Love Me Not | Yuna Ichihara | Lead role | |
| 2020 | Love Me, Love Me Not: The Animation | Ayuko (voice) | Cameo | |
| 2020 | Keep Your Hands Off Eizouken! | Kyu Ajima | | |
| 2021 | Muscat of Happiness | Haruna Souma | Lead role | |
| 2022 | The Blue Skies at Your Feet | Miyu Mizuno | Lead role | |
| 2022 | Soul at Twenty | Natsuki Miyata | | |
| 2022 | Even If This Love Disappears From the World Tonight | Hino Maori | Lead role | |
| 2022 | That Time I Got Reincarnated as a Slime the Movie: Scarlet Bond | Towa (voice) | | |
| 2024 | Dear Family | Yoshimi Tsuboi | | |
| 2024 | Shinji Muroi: Not Defeated | An Hinata | | |
| 2024 | Shinji Muroi: Stay Alive | An Hinata | | |
| 2025 | Trillion Game | Rinrin Takahashi | | |
| 2025 | A Girl & Her Guard Dog | Isaku Senagaki | Lead role | |
| 2025 | #Iwilltellyouthetruth | University student | | |
| 2025 | Stella Next to Me | Chiaki Amano | Lead role | |
| 2026 | Part-time Death Angel | Yukino Hanamori | Lead role | |

=== Television ===
| Year | Title | Role | Notes | Ref. |
|---|---|---|---|---|
| 2017 | &Bishoujo Next Girl Meets Tokyo | Kana Kuriyama | Lead role; episode 9 | |
| 2018 | The Confidence Man JP | | | |
| 2018 | Dragon Pilot: Hisone and Masotan | Natsume Misumi (voice) | TV anime | |
| 2019 | Secret Unrequited Love | Satomi Nomura | | |
| 2019 | Cheat: Beware of Scammers | Kanon Ezawa/ Mirai | Episodes 7 and 8 | |
| 2019 | Black Lizard | Sanae Iwase/ Yoko | | |
| 2020 | Papa Fell in Love Again | Tomo Yamashita | | |
| 2020 | Keep Your Hands Off Eizouken! | Kyu Ajima | | |
| 2020 | Great Edo Journey: The Ise Pilgrimage | Suzu | | |
| 2020 | Three Single Mothers: A Wonderful Life Reversal Story | Seiko Maehara | | |
| 2020 | Escape from the Historical Labyrinth: Real Escape Game x TV Tokyo | Jun Tanida | Lead role | |
| 2021 | Kakegurui Twin | Aiura Kokoro | Web series | |
| 2021 | Captivated by You | Megumi Matsuya | | |
| 2021 | The Grand Family | Mitsuko Manpyo | | |
| 2021 | Kokichi's Wife 2 | Omine | Episode 5 | |
| 2021 | My Love Mix-Up! | Mio Hashimoto | | |
| 2021 | Meguru | Yuriko Baba | | |
| 2021–22 | I Became an Idol's Housekeeper | Haruno Komachi (voice) | Lead role | |
| 2022 | Showa Kayo Musical: Until We Meet Again | Sae Isono | Lead role | |
| 2022 | Red Nurse Call | Arisa Mimori | | |
| 2022 | Fishbowl Wives | Ran Kazama | | |
| 2023 | Trillion Game | Rinrin Takahashi | Episode 2 | |
| 2023 | One Day: Much Ado About Christmas | Asako Tachiki | | |
| 2024 | AARO: All-Domain Anomaly Resolution Office | Hika Toyotama | | |
| 2025 | Dragonite and The Postman | Hana (voice) | TV anime | |
| 2025–26 | Strobe Edge | Ninako Kinoshita | Lead role; 2 seasons | |
| 2026 | Soda Master | Habuka Nishino | | |

== Awards and nominations ==
Year presented, name of the award ceremony, category, nominee(s) of the award, and the result of the nomination
| Year | Award ceremony | Category | Nominated work(s) | Result | Ref. |
|---|---|---|---|---|---|
| 2016 | 8th Toho Cinderella Audition Grand Prix | Shueisha Award, Seventeen Award | Herself | Won | |
| 2022 | 110th The Television Drama Academy Awards | Best Supporting Actress | My Love Mix-Up! | Won | |
| 2022 | 31st TV Life Annual Drama Awards | Best Supporting Actress | My Love Mix-Up! | Won | |
| 2023 | 46th Japan Academy Film Prize | Newcomer of the Year | Even if This Love Disappears From the World Tonight | Won | |

== Publications ==
=== Magazine ===
- Seventeen (January 2017 issue, Shueisha)- Exclusive model

=== Photobook ===
- First Lover (November 25, 2017, Gambit) ISBN 978-4-907462-32-1
- Grace (November 25, 2021, Kodansha) ISBN 978-4-06-525792-0
