= Kyoka Shibata =

Japanese actress (born 1999)

- 柴田 杏花
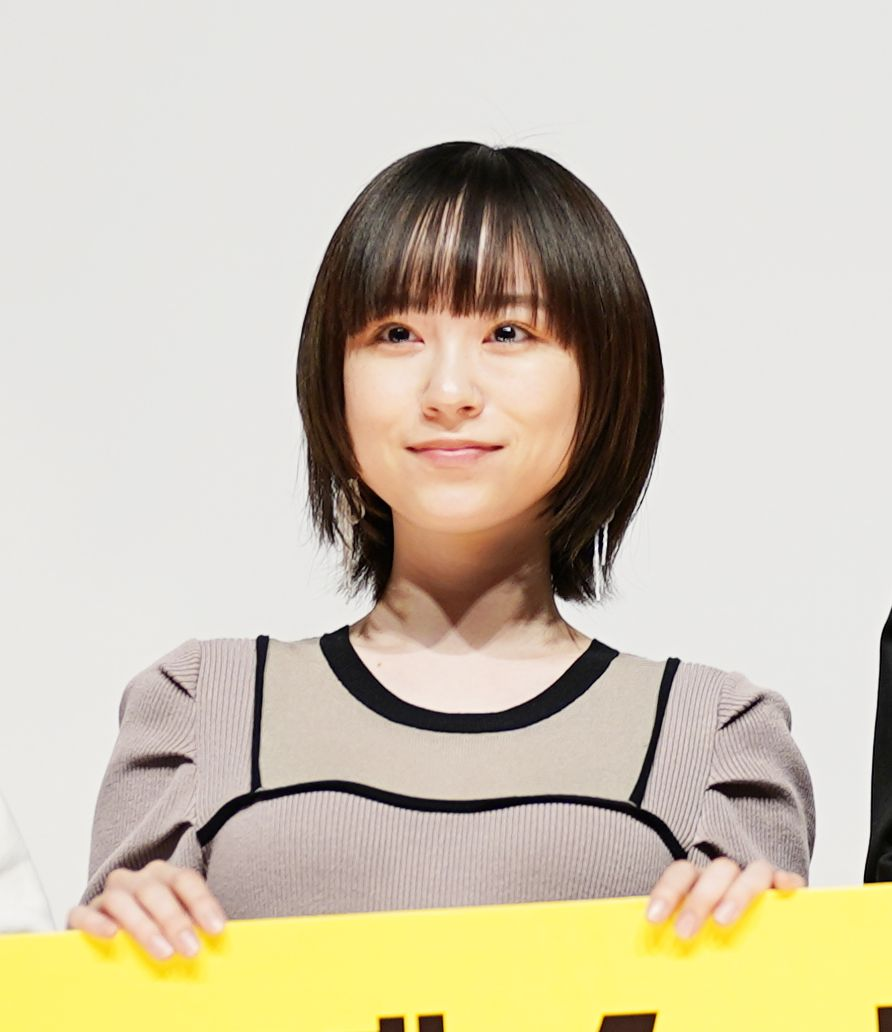
- Movie "Goodbye, Bad Magazines" 2023
- Born: 30 August 1999 (age 26); Tokyo, Japan
- Occupation: Actress
- Years active: 2007–present
- Agent: Stardust Promotion
- Style: Television drama

Kyoka Shibata (柴田 杏花, Shibata Kyōka; born 30 August 1999, in Tokyo) is a Japanese actress.

Shibata is represented with Stardust Promotion's Section Two. She is chosen as one of the Ribon Girls in 2009.

== Filmography ==
=== TV series ===
| Year | Title | Role | Notes | Ref. |
|---|---|---|---|---|
| 2009 | Jin | Nokaze (child) | Episodes 4 and 5 | |
| 2016 | Saki | Hajime Kunihiro | | |
| 2026 | Then You Try Making It! | Amina Minamikawa | | |

=== Films ===
| Year | Title | Role | Notes | Ref. |
|---|---|---|---|---|
| 2014 | Setouchi Kaizoku Monogatari | Murakami Kaede / Murakami Kagechika | Lead role | |
| 2024 | Drawing Closer | Eri Fujimoto | | |
| 2024 | Oasis | Anna | | |

=== Music video appearances ===
| Year | Title | Artist | Notes | Ref. |
|---|---|---|---|---|
| 2014 | Diamond Days: Kokoro no Tsubasa | Yuuka Ueno | | |
