= Kahogo no Kahoko =

- Also known as: Overprotected Kahoko
- Genre: Romance; Family; Drama
- Written by: Kazuhiko Yukawa
- Directed by: Seiichi Nagumo; Ken Higurashi; Akinori Ito; Hiroto Akashi
- Starring: Mitsuki Takahata; Ryoma Takeuchi; Hitomi Kuroki; Saburō Tokitō
- Opening theme: Family Song by Gen Hoshino
- Country of origin: Japan
- Original language: Japanese
- No. of episodes: 10

Production
- Producers: Futoshi Ohira; Risa Tagami
- Running time: 60 minutes
- Production company: NTV

Original release
- Network: NTV
- Release: July 12 – September 13, 2017

Kahogo no Kahoko (過保護のカホコ) (Overprotected Kahoko) is a 2017 Japanese television drama, starring Mitsuki Takahata, Ryoma Takeuchi, Hitomi Kuroki and Saburō Tokitō. It aired on every Wednesday at 22:00 (JST) on NTV from July 12 to September 13, 2017.

== Cast ==
- Mitsuki Takahata as Kahoko Nemoto
- Hitomi Kuroki as Izumi Nemoto
- Saburō Tokitō as Masataka Nemoto
- Ryoma Takeuchi as Hajime Mugino
- Tokuma Nishioka as Fukushi Namiki
- Yoshiko Mita as Shodai Namiki
- Mari Nishio as Takashi Namiki
- Atom Shukugawa as Atsushi Namiki
- Hiroko Nakajima as Tamaki Namiki
- Jiro Sato as Mamoru Namiki
- Sayu Kubota as Ito Namiki
- Masayo Umezawa as Tae Nemoto
- Sei Hiraizumi as Masaoki Nemoto
- Mari Hamada as Noriko Nemoto
