= Nikkan Sports Film Award for Yūjirō Ishihara Newcomer Award =

Annual Japanese film award

- Awarded for: Yūjirō Ishihara Newcomer Award
- Country: Japan
- Presented by: Nikkan Sports
- First award: 1988
- Website: www.nikkansports.com/entertainment/award/ns-cinema/top-ns-cinema.html

The Nikkan Sports Film Award for Yūjirō Ishihara Newcomer Award is an award given at the Nikkan Sports Film Award.

== List of winners ==
No.	Year	Actor	Film(s)
1	1988	Naoto Ogata	Yūshun Oración
2	1989	N/A	N/A
3	1990	Taishū Kase	Inamura Jane
4	1991	N/A	N/A
5	1992	Masaya Kato	
6	1993	Masanobu Takashima	Niji no Hashi; Shuraba no Ningengaku
7	1994	Takuya Kimura	Aoki Densetsu Shoot!
8	1995	N/A	N/A
9	1996	N/A	N/A
10	1997	N/A	N/A
11	1998	N/A	N/A
12	1999	N/A	N/A
13	2000	N/A	N/A
14	2001	Yōsuke Kubozuka	Go
15	2002	Tomoya Nagase	Seoul
16	2003	N/A	N/A
17	2004	Joe Odagiri	Blood and Bones
18	2005	N/A	N/A
19	2006	Junichi Okada	Hana
20	2007	N/A	N/A
21	2008	Shota Matsuda	Ikigami; Hana yori Dango Final: The Movie
22	2009	N/A	N/A
23	2010	Kengo Kora	Solanin; Box!
24	2011	N/A	N/A
25	2012	Tori Matsuzaka	Tsunagu; The Wings of the Kirin
26	2013	N/A	N/A
27	2014	Masahiro Higashide	Parasyte: Part 1 Crows Explode
28	2015	N/A	N/A
29	2016	N/A	N/A
30	2017	Ryoma Takeuchi	Teiichi: Battle of Supreme High
31	2018	Takanori Iwata	Perfect World; Last Winter, We Parted; Vision
32	2019	Ryo Narita	Chiwawa; Farewell Song; Fly Me to the Saitama; Just Only Love; No Longer Human
33	2020	Kenshi Okada	Hope; All About March; The Legacy of Dr. Death: Black File
34	2021	Gordon Maeda	Tokyo Revengers; Jump!! The Heroes Behind the Gold
35	2022	Shunsuke Michieda	Even If This Love Disappears From the World Tonight
36	2023	Hio Miyazawa	Egoist; Spring in Between
37	2024	Jun Saitō	Let's Go Karaoke! Confetti; Shinji Muroi: Not Defeated; Shinji Muroi: Stay Alive
38	2025	Sōya Kurokawa	Kokuho; Catching the Stars of This Summer
