= A Girl & Her Guard Dog =

Japanese manga series

- First tankōbon volume cover

お嬢と番犬くん (Ojō to Banken-kun)
- Genre: Romantic comedy
- Manga
- Written by: Hatsuharu
- Published by: Kodansha
- English publisher: NA: Kodansha USA
- Imprint: Kodansha Comics Betsufure
- Magazine: Bessatsu Friend
- Original run: December 13, 2018 – present
- Volumes: 9
- Anime television series
- Directed by: Yoshihiro Takamoto
- Written by: Aya Satsuki
- Music by: Tsubasa Ito
- Studio: Project No.9
- Licensed by: Crunchyroll: SA / SEA: Medialink
- Original network: Tokyo MX, BS Asahi, ytv
- Original run: September 29, 2023 – December 22, 2023
- Episodes: 13
- Live-action film
- Directed by: Keiichi Kobayashi
- Produced by: Yurika Koike
- Written by: Yо̄suke Masaike
- Studio: Toho Studios
- Released: March 14, 2025
- Runtime: 106 minutes
- icon

A Girl & Her Guard Dog (Japanese: お嬢と番犬くん, Hepburn: Ojō to Banken-kun) is a Japanese manga series written and illustrated by Hatsuharu. It has been serialized in Kodansha's shōjo manga magazine Bessatsu Friend since December 2018, with its chapters collected into nine tankōbon volumes as of September 2023. An anime television series adaptation produced by Project No.9 aired from September to December 2023. A live-action film adaptation premiered in March 2025.

== Synopsis ==
Isaku Senagaki has been feared by those around her because her grandfather Tasuke is the third Senagaki yakuza boss. She gives up on her unrequited crush on Keiya Utō and enrolls in high school to have a normal love life, but Keiya fakes his age and enrolls in the same school.

== Characters ==
Isaku Senagaki (瀬名垣 一咲, Senagaki Isaku)
Voiced by: Akari Kitō
Portrayed by: Riko Fukumoto
Because she is the granddaughter of a yakuza boss, she doesn't have any friends and is bad at socializing. She has a serious but shy personality. She has a crush on Keiya.
Keiya Utō (宇藤 啓弥, Utō Keiya)
Voiced by: Yūichirō Umehara
Portrayed by: Jesse
Young leading subordinate in the Senagaki yakuza and responsible for taking care of Isaku. He is overprotective and sometimes goes too far.
Mikio Tanuki (田貫 幹男, Tanuki Mikio)
Voiced by: Junya Enoki
Portrayed by: Kaito Sakurai
Tasuke's brother's grandson. He is a delinquent who was abandoned by his parents and taken in by his grandfather. He goes to the same school as Isaku and Keiya.
Kaori Sekiya (関谷 香織, Sekiya Kaori)
Voiced by: Mai Nakahara
Portrayed by: Nozomi Sasaki
Former hostess at a club run by the Senagaki yakuza. She had a physical relationship with Keiya.

== Media ==
=== Manga ===
Written and illustrated by Hatsuharu, A Girl & Her Guard Dog began serialization in Kodansha's Bessatsu Friend magazine on December 13, 2018. The manga went on hiatus in March 2023 due to Hatsuharu's health. The first tankōbon volume was released on April 12, 2019. As of September 2023, nine volumes have been released.

In November 2020, Kodansha USA announced that they licensed the series for an English digital release.

==== Volumes ====
No.	Original release date	Original ISBN	English release date	English ISBN
1	April 12, 2019	978-4-06-515154-9	February 16, 2021	978-1-64-659956-1
2	September 13, 2019	978-4-06-517003-8	March 16, 2021	978-1-63-699004-0
3	January 10, 2020	978-4-06-518251-2	April 20, 2021	978-1-63-699056-9
4	June 11, 2020	978-4-06-519779-0	May 18, 2021	978-1-63-699099-6
5	November 13, 2020	978-4-06-521317-9	June 15, 2021	978-1-63-699156-6
6	May 13, 2021	978-4-06-523303-0	October 19, 2021	978-1-63-699422-2
7	January 13, 2022	978-4-06-525897-2	June 21, 2022	978-1-68-491168-4
8	October 13, 2022	978-4-06-529154-2	March 21, 2023	978-1-68-491862-1
9	September 13, 2023	978-4-06-532984-9	February 20, 2024	979-8-88-933375-3

=== Anime ===
An anime television series adaptation was announced on October 10, 2022. It is produced by Project No.9 and directed by Yoshihiro Takamoto, with scripts written by Aya Satsuki, characters designed by Yukiko Ban, and music composed by Tsubasa Ito. The series aired from September 29 to December 22, 2023, on Tokyo MX and other networks. (Note: Tokyo MX lists the series premiere on September 28 at 25:05, which is effectively September 29 at 1:05 a.m. JST.) The opening theme song is "Suki ni Naccha Dame na Hito" (好きになっちゃダメな人; lit. 'A Person You Shouldn't Fall in Love With') by Masayoshi Ōishi, while the ending theme song is "Magie×Magie" by Akari Kitō. Crunchyroll licensed the series outside of Asia. Medialink licensed the series in South Asia, Southeast Asia, and Oceania (excluding Australia and New Zealand) and is streaming it on their Ani-One Asia YouTube channel.

==== Episodes ====
No.	Title	Directed by (Note: Information is taken from the ending credits of each episode.)	Written by	Storyboarded by	Original release date
1	"Spring and Beginnings"; Transliteration: "Haru to Hajimari" (Japanese: 春とはじまり)	Yoshihiro Takamoto	Aya Satsuki	Yoshihiro Takamoto	September 29, 2023
2	"Maidenly Feelings and Parental Feelings"; Transliteration: "Otomegokoro to Oyagokoro" (Japanese: 乙女心と親心)	Taiji Kawanishi	Aya Satsuki	Noriaki Saitō	October 6, 2023
3	"Kisses and Love"; Transliteration: "Kisu to Suki" (Japanese: キスとスキ)	Akira Katō	Aya Satsuki	Noriaki Saitō	October 13, 2023
4	"Duty and Danger"; Transliteration: "Kiken to Tonari Awase" (Japanese: 危険とトナリあわせ)	Tomio Yamauchi	Aya Satsuki	Noriaki Saitō	October 20, 2023
5	"Strife and Settlement"; Transliteration: "Haran to Teuchi" (Japanese: 波乱と手打ち)	Yoshihiro Takamoto & Tomohiro Takahashi	Aya Satsuki	Noriaki Saitō	October 27, 2023
6	"A Midsummer and Night's Dream"; Transliteration: "Manatsu to Yoru no Yume" (Japanese: 真夏と夜の夢)	Taiji Kawanishi	Aya Satsuki	Hikaru Takeuchi & Kōji Yoshikawa	November 3, 2023
7	"Tanuki and Guard Dog"; Transliteration: "Tanuki to Banken" (Japanese: 狸と番犬)	Yoshihiro Takamoto & Tomohiro Takahashi	Miharu Hirami	Noriaki Saitō	November 10, 2023
8	"Cheap Theatrics and Melodrama"; Transliteration: "Sanmon Shibai to Merodorama" (Japanese: 三文芝居とメロドラマ)	Natsumi Yasue	Yoriko Tomita	Noriaki Saitō	November 17, 2023
9	"Knives and Attacks"; Transliteration: "Ninjō to Sata" (Japanese: 刃傷と沙汰)	Akira Katō	Aya Satsuki	Noriaki Saitō	November 24, 2023
10	"Lingering Scents and Whispers"; Transliteration: "Utsuriga to Sasayaki" (Japanese: 移り香と囁き)	Zi Xiong	Miharu Hirami	Noriaki Saitō	December 1, 2023
11	"Days Gone By and Days to Come"; Transliteration: "Koshikata to Yukusue" (Japanese: 来し方と行く末)	Tomio Yamauchi	Yoriko Tomita	Noriaki Saitō	December 8, 2023
12	"Scum and Heart"; Transliteration: "Kuzu to Hāto" (Japanese: クズとハート)	Natsumi Yasue & Tomohiro Takahashi	Aya Satsuki	Noriaki Saitō	December 15, 2023
13	"Wounds and Lovers"; Transliteration: "Kizu to Koibito" (Japanese: 傷と恋人)	Yoshihiro Takamoto	Aya Satsuki	Yoshihiro Takamoto	December 22, 2023

=== Live-action film ===
A live-action film adaptation was announced on May 16, 2024. It is produced by Toho Studios and directed by Keiichi Kobayashi, based on a screenplay by Yо̄suke Masaike. Yurika Koike served as the producer, and Toho distributed the film. The film premiered in Japan on March 14, 2025. SixTones performed the theme song "Barrier" (バリア).

== Reception ==
Caitlin Moore of Anime News Network calls the anime adaptation "a pretty ugly show" due to deformities in the characters' animations and many animation mistakes.
