= Then You Try Making It! =

Japanese manga series by Natsuko Taniguchi

- Cover page of the first tankōbon volume

じゃあ、あんたが作ってみろよ (Jaa, Anta ga Tsukutte Miro yo)
- Genre: Romantic comedy
- Manga
- Written by: Natsuko Taniguchi
- Published by: Bunkasha
- Imprint: Bunkasha Comics
- Magazine: Comic Tanto
- Original run: April 28, 2023 – present
- Volumes: 5
- Television drama
- Directed by: Yoshihiro Ito; Ryosuke Fukuda; Katsuhiro Omoto
- Written by: Kei Ando
- Music by: Takahiro Kaneko
- Studio: TBS Sparkle
- Licensed by: Rakuten Viki (Streaming)
- Original network: TBS Television
- Original run: October 7, 2025 – December 9, 2025
- Episodes: 10 +1 (Note: Special episode)
- icon

Then You Try Making It! (Japanese: じゃあ、あんたが作ってみろよ, Hepburn: Jaa, Anta ga Tsukutte Miro yo) is a Japanese manga series by Natsuko Taniguchi. It has been serialized in Bunkasha's Comic Tanto magazine since April 2023. The manga follows Katsuo, a man whose girlfriend broke up with him because of his conservative beliefs, and his journey in learning how to cook. A television drama adaptation aired from October to December 2025.

== Plot ==
Katsuo Ebihara and Ayumi Yamagishi, who started dating in college, are about to celebrate their sixth anniversary. They have grown accustomed to living together, but when Katsuo proposes, Ayumi breaks up with him. The reason is Katsuo's belief that "it's only natural for women to cook!" Following the breakup, Katsuo starts cooking and gradually changes his values.

== Characters ==
=== Main characters ===
Katsuo Ebihara (海老原勝男, Ebihara Katsuo)
Portrayed by: Ryoma Takeuchi
A man stuck in Showa thought, with beliefs like "it's only natural for women to cook!". After his marriage proposal is rejected and his girlfriend breaks up with him, he decides to start cooking for himself and changes his beliefs in the process.
Ayumi Yamagishi (山岸鮎美, Yamagishi Ayumi)
Portrayed by: Kaho
Ever since she was in high school, she has believed that getting popular is the best way of living. She is the girlfriend of Katsuo, and she cooks and does housework for him. After meeting Nagisa and Teihei, she changes her beliefs. She rejects Katsuo's marriage proposal and breaks up with him.

=== Supporting characters ===
Tsubaki Kashikura (柏倉椿, Kashikura Tsubaki)
Portrayed by: Ayami Nakajo
Minato (ミナトくん, Minato-kun)
Portrayed by: Yuzu Aoki
Rui Shirosaki (白崎ルイ, Shirosaki Rui)
Portrayed by: Mizuki Maehara
Nagisa Yoshii (吉井渚, Yoshii Nagisa)
Portrayed by: Sāya
Taihei Yoshii (吉井太平, Taihei Yoshii)
Portrayed by: Raiku
Amina Minamikawa (南川あみな, Minamikawa Amina)
Portrayed by: Kyoka Shibata

== Production ==
When asked the reason why she created the series in an interview with Walkerplus, Taniguchi said that she saw complaints on social media about husbands who criticize their wives' cooking. She got frustrated and angry, and decided to created a story from the thought that "it would be interesting if the husband, who had criticized the dish, were to cook it himself from scratch." She also said that the creation of the character was based on a word from her friend.

== Media ==
=== Manga ===
Written and illustrated by Natsuko Taniguchi, Then You Try Making It! began serialization in Bunkasha's Comic Tanto magazine on April 28, 2023. The first tankōbon volume was released in December 14, 2023. As of October 9, 2026, five volumes have been released.

==== Volumes ====
No.	Release date	ISBN
1	December 14, 2023	978-4-8211-5720-4
2	August 9, 2024	978-4-8211-5894-2
3	April 10, 2025	978-4-8211-1034-6
4	December 10, 2025	978-4-8211-1132-9
5	October 9, 2026	978-4-8211-1237-1

=== Drama ===
In July 2025, a television drama adaptation was announced. It was produced by TBS Television and directed by Yoshihiro Ito, Ryosuke Fukuda, and Katsuhiro Omoto, with the script written by Kei Ando. The music is provided by Takahiro Kaneko. The series aired from October 7 to December 9, 2025, on TBS Television's Tuesday Drama slot. Its time slot is primarily targeted at women, so a drama with a male protagonist was considered unusual. The series' theme song is "Shapeshifter" (シェイプシフター) performed by This is Last. The series stars Kaho as Ayumi Yamagishi and Ryoma Takeuchi as Katsuo Ebihara. Rakuten Viki streams the series outside Japan.

==== Episodes ====
No.	Title	Directed by (Note: Production staff information is taken from the ending credits of each episode.)	Written by	Original release date	Ratings (Note: Viewer rating according to Video Research gathered from real-time household viewership in the Kanto Region)
1	"Wake Up! Fossil Man!"; Transliteration: "Kaseki Otoko yo, Kizuke!" (Japanese: 化石男よ、気付け！)	Yoshihiro Ito	Kei Ando	October 7, 2025	6.3%
2	"Go Forth, Patient Woman!"; Transliteration: "Nintai On'na yo, Susume!" (Japanese: 忍耐女よ、 すすめ！)	Yoshihiro Ito	Kei Ando	October 14, 2025	7.0%
3	"Open the Door to Change!"; Transliteration: "Henka no Tobira yo, Hirake!" (Japanese: 変化の扉よ、ひらけ！)	Ryosuke Fukuda	Kei Ando	October 21, 2025	6.8%
4	"Time Machine, Move!"; Transliteration: "Taimumashin yo, Ugoke!" (Japanese: タイムマシンよ、うごけ！)	Ryosuke Fukuda	Kei Ando	October 28, 2025	4.5%
5	"Fly, Toriten!"; Transliteration: "Toriten yo, Sora o Tobe!" (Japanese: とり天よ、空を飛べ！)	Yoshihiro Ito	Kei Ando & Noriko Kato	November 4, 2025	7.0%
6	"Fossil Man, Save the Patient Woman!"; Transliteration: "Kaseki Otoko yo, Nintai On'na o Sukue!" (Japanese: 化石男よ、忍耐女を救え！)	Ryosuke Fukuda	Kei Ando & Shiori Ueno	November 11, 2025	8.1%
7	"Analog Family, Let's Go!"; Transliteration: "Anarogu Kazoku yo, Futsukare!" (Japanese: アナログ家族よ、ぶつかれ！)	Katsuhiro Omoto	Kei Ando	November 18, 2025	6.7%
8	"Fossil Mother has arrived!" Transliteration: "Kaseki Haha ga, Ki-chon!" (Japanese: 化石母が、来ちょん！)	Ryosuke Fukuda	Kei Ando	November 25, 2025	7.9%
9	"Eat the Onigiri and Cheer Up!"; Transliteration: "Onigiri Tabete, Genki daze!" (Japanese: おにぎり食べて、元気だせ！)	Yoshihiro Ito	Kei Ando	December 2, 2025	8.0%
10	"Let the Clumsy Love Bring Change!"; Transliteration: "Bukiyō-na Ai de, Kaware!" (Japanese: 不器用な愛で、変われ！)	Yoshihiro Ito	Kei Ando & Norihito Nakayashiki	December 9, 2025	8.7%

== Reception ==
The series had over 400,000 copies in circulation by October 2025, and ranked fourth in the 2025 edition of Takarajimasha's Kono Manga ga Sugoi! guidebook under "Woman's Category"

The television drama series ranked second in Video Research's overall viewer rating for Fall 2025 Drama for real-time or time-shift viewing with 16.1% household viewership rating. The series recorded approximately 60 million views on the streaming platform TVer, the highest number of views for a TBS drama in history on the platform. It has gained praise from women and men. Walkerplus said the series is "the number one drama on terrestrial television this season [Fall 2025], which is packed with highly anticipated shows". Shueisha Online describes the television series as "2025's biggest social phenomenon drama", praising the series' handling of gender issues, especially Katsuo (Takeuchi)'s character development. Doraji of Weekly Toyo Keizai also praised Katsuo's character development, adding that the way he deepens his communication with his colleagues can be interpreted as "cooking in modern times has transformed from 'something that women take the lead in to support their families' to 'something that contributes to building relationships with those around you, regardless of gender.'" Fuyu Kimata said that a major factor for the show's popularity is that it was a story about the male character "reflecting on his actions and growing as a person", adding that Katsuo, "the type of person people most wish would change in the Reiwa era", changed his ways very quickly.

=== Accolades ===
Awards and nominations for Then You Try Making It!
Ceremony	Year	Award/Category	Recipient	Result	Ref.
Crea Manga Award	2024	Late Night Manga	Then You Try Making It! (manga)	Won	
Renta! Manga Award	2024	New Era Love Manga Award	Then You Try Making It! (manga)	Won	
The Television Drama Academy Awards	2025	Best Work	Then You Try Making It! (drama)	Won	
The Television Drama Academy Awards	2025	Best Actress	Kaho	Won	
The Television Drama Academy Awards	2025	Best Director	Yoshihiro Ito, Ryosuke Fukuda & Katsuhiro Omoto	Won	
The Television Drama Academy Awards	2025	Best Actor	Ryoma Takeuchi	Won	
Modelpress Best Drama Awards	2025	Best Leading Actor	Ryoma Takeuchi	Won	
TVer Award	2025	Drama Grand Prize	Then You Try Making It! (drama)	Won	

== Further readings ==
- "その価値観にならざるをえなかった、人それぞれの理由がある。ドラマ『じゃあ、あんたが作ってみろよ』が描いたもの" [There are different reasons why people have had to adopt those values. This is what the drama "Then You Try Making It!" depicted.]. Mi-Mollet (in Japanese). December 22, 2025. Archived from the original on April 10, 2026 – via Yahoo! News Japan.
- Izumi, Koichi (December 11, 2025). 賛否両論「じゃあつく」最終回のラストを“定番”にしなかったワケ 竹内涼真の“勝男”に期待される「次の展開」 [Pros and cons The reason why the last of the final episode of "Jaa Tsuku" was not "standard" The "next development" expected by Ryoma Takeuchi's "Katsuo]. Aera Digital (in Japanese). The Asahi Shimbun. Archived from the original on January 21, 2026.
- Sano, Kahide (December 9, 2025). "『じゃあ、あんたが作ってみろよ』はなぜ名作に？ "エンタメの必要課題"に応えた脚本力" [Why did "Then you try making it" a masterpiece? Scriptwriting skills that respond to "necessary issues of entertainment"]. RealSound (in Japanese). Archived from the original on April 18, 2026.
