= Even If This Love Disappears From the World Tonight =

Even If This Love Disappears From the World Tonight may refer to:

- Even If This Love Disappears From the World Tonight (novel), a 2020 novel by Misaki Ichijo, the basis of the 2022 and 2025 films
- Even If This Love Disappears From the World Tonight (2022 film), a Japanese romantic film by Takahiro Miki
- Even If This Love Disappears From the World Tonight (2025 film), a Korean romantic film by Kim Hye-young
