= 115man Kilo no Film =

Song by Official Hige Dandism

from the album Escaparade
- Language: Japanese
- Released: April 11, 2018
- Genre: J-pop
- Length: 5:24
- Label: Lastrum
- Songwriter: Satoshi Fujihara

Audio sample
- file; help

"115man Kilo no Film" (Japanese: 115万キロのフィルム; lit. "1.15 Million Kilometer Film") is a song recorded by Japanese band Official Hige Dandism from their first studio album Escaparade, released on April 11, 2018. The song was featured as a theme song for live-action film adaptation of the manga Love Me, Love Me Not. It peaked at No. 11 on the Billboard Japan Hot 100.

== Composition and lyrics ==
"115man Kilo no Film" is composed in the key of E-flat major, 97 beats per minute with a running time of 5 minutes and 24 seconds. Written and composed by vocalist/pianist Satoshi Fujihara, the song is described by the band as the desire to not forget the time to live with the people we care about as much as possible while sharing any minor anxiety and happiness together.

== Music video ==
The live version video of the song was released on April 5, 2019 and directed by Akitaka Deguchi. It is taken from Higedan Acoustic One-Man Live 2018 –Autumn– Live DVD. As of September 2021, it has over 60 million views on YouTube. On July 11, 2020, the short version video of the song was released by Toho YouTube channel, contains scenes of the female protagonist Akari Yamamoto from live-action film of the manga Love Me, Love Me Not.

== Personnel ==
Official Hige Dandism

- Satoshi Fujihara – lead vocals, piano, lyrics, composer
- Daisuke Ozasa – guitar, backing vocals
- Makoto Narazaki – bass guitar, backing vocals
- Masaki Matsuura – drums, backing vocals

== Charts ==
=== Weekly charts ===
Chart (2019)	Peak position
Japan (Japan Hot 100)	14
Chart (2020)	Peak position
Japan (Japan Hot 100)	11
Chart (2021)	Peak position
Japan (Japan Hot 100)	34

=== Year-end charts ===
Chart (2019)	Position
Japan (Japan Hot 100)	77
Chart (2020)	Position
Japan (Japan Hot 100)	16
Chart (2021)	Position
Japan (Japan Hot 100)	51
Chart (2022)	Position
Japan (Japan Hot 100)	60
Chart (2023)	Position
Japan (Japan Hot 100)	54
Chart (2024)	Position
Japan (Japan Hot 100)	79

=== All-time charts ===
Chart (2008–2022)	Position
Japan (Japan Hot 100)	21
