= Teiichi: Battle of Supreme High =

- Film poster
- Directed by: Akira Nagai
- Written by: Yoshihiro Izumi
- Based on: Teiichi no Kuni by Usamaru Furuya
- Starring: Masaki Suda; Shūhei Nomura; Ryoma Takeuchi; Shotaro Mamiya; Jun Shison; Yudai Chiba; Mei Nagano; Kōtarō Yoshida
- Cinematography: Keisuke Imamura
- Edited by: Masaharu Hirakawa; Suguru Ninomuya
- Music by: Takashi Watanabe
- Production company: AOI Pro.
- Distributed by: Toho
- Release date: April 29, 2017 (Japan)
- Running time: 118 minutes
- Country: Japan
- Language: Japanese
- Box office: ¥1.73 billion (US$15,545,390)

Teiichi: Battle of Supreme High (Japanese: 帝一の國, Hepburn: Teiichi no Kuni) is a 2017 Japanese comedy film directed by Akira Nagai and based on the manga series of the same name written by Usamaru Furuya.

== Plot ==
Kaitei Supreme High School is described as a prestigious private high school in Japan. Admission is highly selective, with approximately 800 students reportedly enrolled from across the country. The school is said to have strong connections with Japan's business and political communities, and its student government is portrayed as an important leadership institution. According to accounts of the school, former student union presidents may go on to pursue careers in politics, although such positions do not automatically lead to government office. Competition for student union leadership is also described as strong, with candidates generally expected to have previously served as class representatives.

In the April of this year, the new school term starts. The first year student at The Kaitei Supreme High School, Teiichi Akaba with his childhood dream which is to become the prime minister of Japan becomes the monitor of class one successfully. Also, Teiichi Akaba's father is a dignitary in the political circle. Then Teiichi Akaba decides to take part in the campaign of student union's president. However, he must face other powerful competitors' challenge. One of the main competitor, Kikuma Tōgō is the monitor of class two, and he is the son of Teiichi Akaba's father's political mortal enemy. The other competitor is the monitor of class three, Dan Ōtaka. He has excellent academic grades and actually comes from the lower middle class of society.

The ambitious Teiichi Akaba starts his political career by supporting the second year student Roland Himuro who is the monitor of class six to become the president of the student union. The dominant competitor of Roland Himuro is the monitor of class five, Okuto Morizono. In the student convention of school, Teiichi Akaba offers a proposal of being the flag raiser to Roland Himuro. During the conference, Kikuma Tōgō tries to cut the line of the flag in order to cast blame on Teiichi Akaba. However, his trickery not prevailed successfully. After this accident, Teiichi Akaba earns the trust of Roland Himuro.

In the future, Teiichi Akaba must try his best on strategy, on the social network and on academic grades. He even wants to sacrifices his life fighting against his enemies. Many unpredictable betrays and traps are waiting for him. The battle on The Kaitei Supreme High school started.

== Cast ==
- Masaki Suda as Teiichi Akaba
- Shūhei Nomura as Kikuma Tōgō
- Ryoma Takeuchi as Dan Ōtaka
- Shotaro Mamiya as Roland Himuro
- Jun Shison as Kōmei Sakakibara
- Yudai Chiba as Okuto Morizono
- Mei Nagano as Mimiko Shiratori
- Katsuhiro Suzuki as Mitsuhiko Koma
- Ryo Kimura as Keigo Dōyama
- Amane Okayama as Yōsuke Sasaki
- Kazuhiro Yamaji as Usaburō Tōgō, Kikuma's father
- Sei Matobu
- Ikuji Nakamura
- Takaaki Enoki as the prime minister
- Kōtarō Yoshida as Jōsuke Akaba, Teiichi's father

== Awards ==
Award ceremony	Category	Nominee	Result
42nd Hochi Film Award	Best Actor	Masaki Suda	Won
30th Nikkan Sports Film Award	Best Actor	Masaki Suda	Won
30th Nikkan Sports Film Award	Yūjirō Ishihara Newcomer Award	Ryoma Takeuchi	Won
41st Japan Academy Prize	Newcomer of the Year	Ryoma Takeuchi	Won

== Reception ==
The film earned ¥214 million (US$1.9 million) and ranked #4 in the Japanese box office on its opening weekend.
