= Minato's Laundromat =

Japanese manga series

- First volume cover

みなと商事コインランドリー (Minato Shōji Koin Randorī)
- Genre: Boys' love
- Manga
- Written by: Yuzu Tsubaki
- Illustrated by: Sawa Kanzume
- Published by: Kadokawa
- English publisher: NA: Yen Press
- Imprint: Gene Pixiv Series
- Magazine: Gene Pixiv
- Original run: December 7, 2019 – present
- Volumes: 7
- Television drama
- Directed by: Junichi Kanai; Hiroaki Yuasa (season 1); Yūka Eda (season 1); Hitomi Kitagawa (season 2); Ryo Kawasaki (season 2)
- Produced by: Yukitoshi Komatsu
- Written by: Junichi Kanai; Subaru Yamashita; Rima Kitaki
- Music by: Yasuyoshi Suzuki
- Licensed by: Viki; GagaOOLala
- Original network: TXN (TV Tokyo)
- Original run: July 7, 2022 – September 21, 2023
- Episodes: 12

Minato's Laundromat (Japanese: みなと商事コインランドリー, Hepburn: Minato Shōji Koin Randorī; lit. "Minato Trading Coin Laundry") is a Japanese manga series written by Yuzu Tsubaki and illustrated by Sawa Kanzume. It has been serialized on the website Gene Pixiv since December 7, 2019. A live-action television drama adaptation was broadcast from July 7, 2022, to September 22, 2022, with a second season in July 2023.

== Plot ==
Akira Minato, a man in his 30s, quits his office job in Tokyo and returns to his hometown to take over his grandfather's laundromat, Minato's Laundromat. When Shintaro Katsuki, a high school student, appears at the laundromat one day, Akira develops an odd friendship with him. However, when Akira accidentally reveals to Shintaro that he is gay, Shintaro begins to pursue him romantically.

== Characters ==
Akira Minato (湊 晃, Minato Akira)
Voiced by: Seiichiro Yamashita (drama CD); Portrayed by: Takuya Kusakawa
Akira is a former salaryman in his 30s who returns to his hometown to take over his grandfather's laundromat.
Shintaro Katsuki (香月 慎太郎, Katsuki Shintarō)
Voiced by: Nobunaga Shimazaki (drama CD); Portrayed by: Sho Nishigaki
Shintaro is a second-year high school student.
Sakurako Katsuki (香月 桜子, Katsuki Sakurako)
Portrayed by: Hana Toyoshima
Sakurako is Shintaro's younger sister.
Asuka Hanabusa (英 明日香, Hanabusa Asuka)
Portrayed by: Tomoya Oku
Asuka is Shintaro's classmate. His family owns a fish shop that Akira frequents and has known him since childhood.
Takayuki Sakuma (佐久間 孝之, Sakuma Takayuki)
Portrayed by: Seiji Fukushi
Mr. Sakuma is a former teacher at Keyaki High School and Akira's first love.
Shu Sakuma (佐久間 柊, Sakuma Shū)
Portrayed by: Yu Inaba
Shu is Mr. Sakuma's younger brother who teaches part-time at a cram school.

== Media ==
=== Manga ===
From April 1, 2019, through May 15, 2019, Kadokawa Corporation held a contest titled "Light-hearted Romance BL Manga Original Work" through Pixiv, where the winners would be able to have their work be adapted into a manga series. On April 6, 2019, Yuzu Tsubaki posted a story titled Wash My Heart! on Pixiv and submitted it to the contest. The entry won 2nd place, and it was later picked it up for a manga serialization under the title Minato Shōji Coin Laundry, with Sawa Kazume providing the illustrations. It has been serialized digitally on Gene Pixiv since December 7, 2019. The chapters were later released in seven bound volumes by Kadokawa under the Gene Pixiv Series imprint.

On April 7, 2023, Yen Press announced at Sakura-Con that they had licensed the series for North American distribution in English.

==== Volume list ====
No.	Original release date	Original ISBN	English release date	English ISBN
1	August 27, 2020	978-4040646237	October 17, 2023	978-1975365240
2	July 27, 2021	978-4046803498	March 19, 2024	978-1975365264
3	March 26, 2022	978-4046812391	July 23, 2024	978-1975365288
4	January 27, 2023	978-4046818904	December 10, 2024	978-1975390143
5	January 26, 2024	978-4046830258	April 22, 2025	979-8855405545
6	January 27, 2025	978-4046842206	January 20, 2026	979-8855424409
7	May 27, 2026	978-4046600745	—	—

==== Anthologies ====
No.	Title	Japanese release date	Japanese ISBN
1	Minato Shōji Koin Randorī: Koshiki Ansorojī Komikku Fuwafuwa (みなと商事コインランドリー 公式アンソロジーコミック ふわふわ)	November 26, 2022	978-4046817877

=== Novels ===
Tsubaki's original novels were later compiled and given a physical release by Kadokawa, with Sanzume providing the novels' illustrations.

No.	Title	Japanese release date	Japanese ISBN
1	Noberu Minato Shōji Koin Randorī: Utakata no Kisu (ノベル みなと商事コインランドリー うたかたのキス)	February 28, 2022	978-4046811387
2	Noberu Minato Shōji Koin Randorī: Irekawari no Koi (ノベル みなと商事コインランドリー いれかわりの恋)	June 27, 2022	978-4046814500
3	Noberu Minato Shōji Koin Randorī: Hīragu Tabiji (ノベル みなと商事コインランドリー ひいらぐ旅路)	April 27, 2023	978-4046823465

=== Drama CD ===
An audio drama adaptation was released onto CD, available as a bonus with the August 2021 issue of Weekly Comic Gene that was released on July 15, 2021. The audio drama stars Seiichiro Yamashita as Akira and Nobunaga Shimazaki as Shintaro.

=== Television drama ===
A live-action television drama adaptation of Minato's Laundromat was announced on March 21, 2022. The series premiered on July 7, 2022 (Note: The series is listed with the premiere date of July 6, 2022 at 24:30, which is July 7 at 12:30 AM.) on TV Tokyo and the streaming service Paravi. It was also released internationally on GagaOOLala. The first season was directed by Junichi Kanai, Hiroaki Yuasa, and Yuka Eda. Kanai also wrote the script with Subaru Yamashita and Rima Kitaki. Yukitoshi Komatsu was credited as the producer.

The drama adaptation stars Bullet Train member Takuya Kusakawa as Akira and Sho Nishigaki as Shintaro. The supporting cast includes Seiji Fukushi as Takayuki Sakuma, Yu Inaba as Shu Sakuma, Tomoya Oku as Asuka Hanabusa, and Hana Toyoshima as Sakurako Katsuki. Sayuri Inoue was later cast as Saki Machida, an original character for the TV drama who serves as Akira's former roommate and ex-girlfriend. The opening theme is "Gyutto" by Chō Tokimeki Sendenbu and the ending theme is "Tsuitachi" by Kaeri no Kai.

A second season was announced on April 23, 2023, and is set to premiere in July 2023. Kanai returned to direct the series, while Hitomi Yamashita and Ryo Kawasaki were added as new co-directors.

==== Season 1 (2022) ====
No. overall	No. in season	Title	Directed by	Written by	Original release date
1	1	"Midsummer Light-hearted Love!"; Transliteration: "Manatsu no Yurukyun Rabu!" (Japanese: 真夏のゆるきゅんラブ！)	Junichi Kanai	Junichi Kanai	July 7, 2022
2	2	"The Magic Word is "Friend"?!"; Transliteration: "Tomodachi tte Mahō no Kotoba!?" (Japanese: 友達って魔法の言葉!?)	Junichi Kanai	Junichi Kanai	July 14, 2022
3	3	"A Love Rival Appears!"; Transliteration: "Koi no Raibaru Arawaru!" (Japanese: 恋のライバル現る!)	Hiroaki Yuasa	Junichi Kanai	July 21, 2022
4	4	"Discord in My Heart... This is Love!"; Transliteration: "Kokoro no Kattō... Kore wa Koi!" (Japanese: 心の葛藤…これは恋!)	Hiroaki Yuasa	Junichi Kanai	July 28, 2022
5	5	"Reuniting with the Person on My Mind... Time for a Decision?!"; Transliteration: "Omoi Hito to Saikai... Ketsui no Toki!?" (Japanese: 想い人と再会…決意の時!?)	Yūka Eda	Subaru Yamashita	August 4, 2022
6	6	"Graduation from the Past Me!"; Transliteration: "Kako no Jibun kara Sotsugyō!" (Japanese: 過去の自分から卒業!)	Yūka Eda	Subaru Yamashita	August 11, 2022
7	7	"Awkwardness Between Us... The Truth From 10 Years Ago?!"; Transliteration: "Kimazui Futari... Jū-nen no Shinsō!?" (Japanese: 気まずい二人…10年前の真相!?)	Yūka Eda	Subaru Yamashita	August 18, 2022
8	8	"The End of Summer and Each Person's Decision!"; Transliteration: "Natsu no Owari to Sorezore no Ketsudan!" (Japanese: 夏の終わりとそれぞれの決断!)	Yūka Eda	Subaru Yamashita	August 25, 2022
9	9	"I'll Cheer On Your Love"; Transliteration: "Sono Koi, Ouenshimasu" (Japanese: その恋、応援します)	Junichi Kanai	Rima Kitaki	September 1, 2022
10	10	"The Conclusion of 10 Years Past!"; Transliteration: "Jū-nen-goshi no Kecchaku!" (Japanese: 10年越しの決着!)	Junichi Kanai	Subaru Yamashita	September 8, 2022
11	11	"Our First Sleepover on Our Date in Tokyo?!"; Transliteration: "Tōkyō Dēto de Hatsu no Otomari!?" (Japanese: 東京デートで初のお泊まり!?)	Junichi Kanai	Junichi Kanai	September 15, 2022
12	12	"The Future that We Chose is..." Transliteration: "Futari ga Eranda Mirai to wa..." (Japanese: 2人が選んだ未来とは…)	Junichi Kanai	Junichi Kanai	September 22, 2022

== Reception ==
Minato's Laundromat was ranked 10th in the Web Manga General Election 2020. It was later ranked 1st in the 2023 edition.
