= Mahiru Konno =

Japanese actress (born 1977)

- 紺野 まひる
- Born: April 12, 1977 (age 49); Osaka, Japan
- Occupation: Actress
- Years active: 1996–present
- Children: 2

Mahiru Konno (紺野 まひる, Konno Mahiru; born April 12, 1977 in Toyonaka, Osaka Prefecture) is a Japanese actress.

Konno is a former member of the Takarazuka Revue. She married her husband, a pilot, in 2008. They have two children.

== Filmography ==
=== Film ===
- Stella Next to Me (2025) – Tōko Hiiragi

=== Television ===
- Fūrin Kazan (2007) – Ogoto-hime
- Diplomat Kosaku Kuroda (2011) – Tomoyo Shimomura
- Our Sister's Soulmate (2020) – Saori Kishimoto
- Come Come Everybody (2021)
