= Aruko =

Japanese manga artist

Aruko アルコ
- Born: July 26 Ishikawa Prefecture
- Area: Manga artist
- Notable works: Yasuko to Kenji; My Love Story!!; My Love Mix-Up!
- Collaborators: Kazune Kawahara; Wataru Hinekure
- Awards: 2013 Kodansha Manga Award in the shōjo category; 2016 and 2022 Shogakukan Manga Award in the shōjo category

Aruko (Japanese: アルコ; born July 26) is a Japanese manga artist. After debuting in 1999, she launched her first series, Yasuko to Kenji, in 2005. Following its completion, she began illustrating Kazune Kawahara's My Love Story!! in 2011, which performed well and received multiple adaptations. Following My Love Story!!'s completion, Aruko began illustrating My Love Mix-Up! in 2019.

== Biography ==
Aruko was born in Ishikawa Prefecture on July 26. Aruko debuted as a manga artist in 1999 with the one-shot Ame no Chi Hare, published in Bessatsu Margaret. After writing a couple more one shots, she launched Yasuko to Kenji in 2005. It would later receive a TV drama adaptation. Following Yasuko to Kenji's completion, Aruko penned a few more one-shots. She would later be approached by editors of Bessatsu Margaret to illustrate a new series written by Kazune Kawahara. Aruko was a fan of some of Kawahara's other works, so she promptly agreed.

Together they created My Love Story!!, which debuted in October 2011. The series performed well and won the Kodansha Manga Award in the shōjo in 2013 and the Shogakukan Manga Award in the shōjo category in 2016. The series has also received multiple adaptations, notably an anime television series and a live-action film.

In June 2019, Aruko began illustrating a new series, My Love Mix-Up!; it was written by Wataru Hinekure. The series has received a TV drama adaptation. The series won the Shogakukan Manga Award in the shōjo category in 2022.

== Works ==
- Ame no Chi Hare (雨ノチ晴レ) (1999) (one-shot published in Bessatsu Margaret)
- Yasuko to Kenji (ヤスコとケンジ) (2005–2006) (serialized in Bessatsu Margaret)
- My Love Story!! (俺物語!!, Ore Monogatari!!) (2011–2016) (serialized in Bessatsu Margaret; written by Kazune Kawahara)
- My Love Mix-Up! (消えた初恋, Kieta Hatsukoi) (2019–2022) (serialized in Bessatsu Margaret; written by Wataru Hinekure)
