= Ryoma Takeuchi =

Japanese actor, model and television personality (born 1993)

- 竹内 涼真
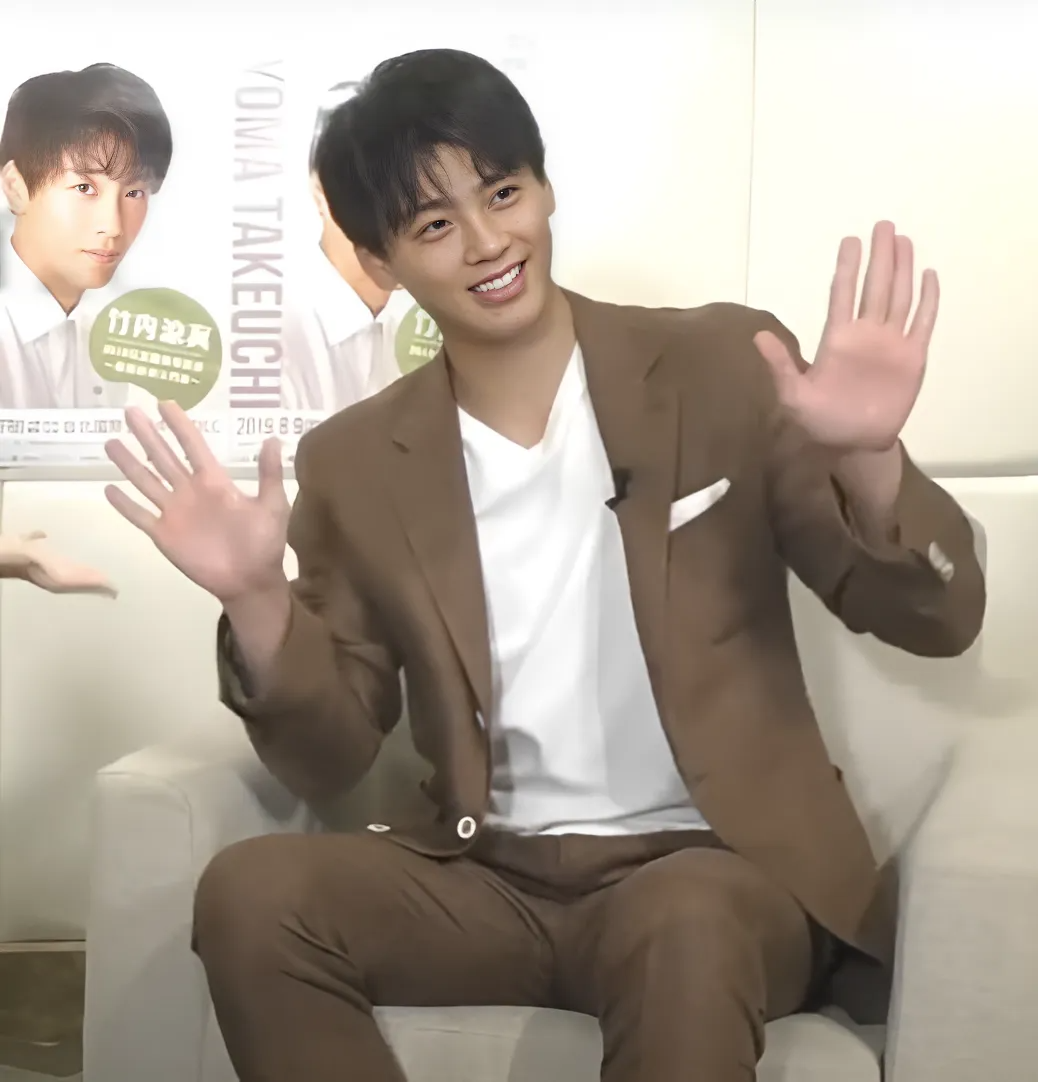
- Takeuchi in 2019
- Born: Ryo Takeuchi; April 26, 1993 (age 33); Machida, Tokyo, Japan
- Occupations: Actor; model; television personality
- Years active: 2013–present
- Agent: Horipro
- Notable work: Kamen Rider Drive
- Height: 1.87 m (6 ft 2 in)
- Website: Official website

Ryo Takeuchi (Japanese: 竹内 崚, Hepburn: Takeuchi Ryō; born April 26, 1993), better known by the stage name Ryoma Takeuchi (竹内 涼真) is a Japanese actor, model, and television personality who is affiliated with Horipro. He was a Rissho University Global Environmental Sciences student. He is best known for his role as Shinnosuke Tomari, the main character of Kamen Rider Drive; Ebihara Katsuo in the TBS 2025 drama Jaa, Anta Ga Tsukutte Miro Yo; and Suzuki Shinya in the movie 10Dance.

== Personal life ==
Takeuchi is the eldest of three siblings, with one younger sister and one younger brother. His real name is Ryo Takeuchi. His parents love the sounds of "Ryo", so they gave the name Ryo to him. The kanji "崚" of his name is quite rare to use in a name.

Takeuchi started playing soccer when he was five, he belonged to Tokyo Verdy when he was young. He originally went to a college on a soccer recommendation, but did not pursue a soccer career.

=== Relationship ===
In 2019, there were media speculations about Takeuchi and Ayaka Miyoshi's romantic relationship, but their agencies at that time did not disclose any information about the two, and they themselves did not comment on the reports till later in May 2020, when it was revealed by media outlets that they were already living together and were "counting down the days until marriage." However, on October 27, 2024, the couple reportedly split after four years to focus more on their careers.

== Career ==
In April 2013, Takeuchi was featured in the female magazine Mina, after winning the audition Mina Kare Grand Prix, which was contested by 2,457 people. He has acted in films and television series.

From 2014 to 2015 Takeuchi played the protagonist, Shinnosuke Tomari/Kamen Rider Drive in Kamen Rider Drive.

On November 21, 2016, Takeuchi was one of the three winners of 2016 Best Stylish Award.

In 2017, Takeuchi had breakthrough roles as Jun'ichiro Shimatani in NHK Morning Drama (Asadora) Hiyokko, as Hajime Mugino in NTV Drama Kahogo no Kahoko and as Hiroto Mogi in TBS Sunday Drama Rikuoh.

In January 2020, he played his first leading role in a Sunday Theatre (TBS) in Ship of Theseus. He's the youngest to have led in Sunday Theatre at the age of 26.

On April 25, 2022, Takeuchi was cast in TV Asahi's drama Roppongi Class, a remake of the hit South Korean drama series Itaewon Class as Arata Miyabe.

== Filmography ==
=== Film ===
Year	Title	Role	Notes	Ref(s)
2014	Kamen Rider × Kamen Rider Drive & Gaim: Movie War Full Throttle	Shinnosuke Tomari/Kamen Rider Drive	Lead role	
2015	Super Hero Taisen GP: Kamen Rider 3	Shinnosuke Tomari/Kamen Rider Drive	Lead role	
2015	Kamen Rider Drive: Surprise Future	Shinnosuke Tomari/Kamen Rider Drive	Lead role	
2015	Kamen Rider × Kamen Rider Ghost & Drive: Super Movie War Genesis	Shinnosuke Tomari/Kamen Rider Drive	Lead role	
2016	Yell for the Blue Sky	Daisuke Yamada	Lead role	
2016	Kamen Rider Heisei Generations: Dr. Pac-Man vs. Ex-Aid & Ghost with Legend Rider	Shinnosuke Tomari/Kamen Rider Drive		
2017	Teiichi: Battle of Supreme High	Dan Ōtaka		
2017	Last Cop THE MOVIE	Shogo Wakayama		
2018	My Teacher, My Love	Yoshitaka Hiromitsu	Lead role	
2018	Run! T High School Basketball Club	Jun Sato		
2019	Detective Pikachu	Male Pokémon Trainer	Cameo; American film	
2019	Love Stoppage Time	Issei Asami		
2021	The Sun Stands Still	Ryōichi Taoka		
2022	The Deer King	Hossal (voice)		
2022	Akira and Akira	Akira Yamazaki	Lead role	
2024	Love You as the World Ends: The Movie Final	Hibiki Mamiya	Lead role	
2025	10Dance	Shin'ya Suzuki	Lead role	

=== Television and Web drama series/specials ===
Year	Title	Role	Notes	Ref(s)
2014	How to Find The Love of Your Life in 10 days	Nomiya		
2014–15	Kamen Rider Drive	Shinnosuke Tomari/Kamen Rider Drive	Lead role	
2015–18	Downtown Rocket	Yosuke Tachibana	2 seasons	
2016	Clinical Criminologist Hideo Himura's Inference	Ryuzuo Onizuka	Episode 7-10	
2016	Sumika Sumire	Kento Tsujii		
2016	The Girl Who Leapt Through Time	Goro Asakura		
2016	The Last Cop	Shogo Wakayama		
2017	Overprotected Kahoko	Hajime Mugino		
2017	Hiyokko	Jun'ichiro Shimatani	Asadora	
2017	Rikuoh	Hiroto Mogi		
2018–24	Black Forceps	Masashi Sera	2 seasons	
2018	Overprotected Kahoko: 2018 Love & Dream	Hajime Mugino	TV movie	
2019	Downtown Rocket Special	Yosuke Tachibana	TV movie	
2019	Hiyokko 2	Jun'ichiro Shimatani	Miniseries; episode 3	
2020	Ship of Theseus	Shin Tamura	Lead role	
2020	The Sun Stands Still: The Eclipse	Ryōichi Taoka		
2020	The Way of the Househusband	Narrator	Episode 10	
2020	Day-Off of Ryoma Takeuchi	Himself	Lead role	
2021–23	Love You as the World Ends	Hibiki Mamiya	Lead role; 4 seasons	
2022	Roppongi Class	Arata Miyabe	Lead role	
2022	Love You as the World Ends Special	Hibiki Mamiya	Lead role; TV movie	
2023	Love You as the World Ends Special 2	Hibiki Mamiya	Lead role; TV movie	
2023	Sunset	Rikito Tateishi	Miniseries	
2023	Persona's Informed: The Suspect with Three Faces	Shuta Motomura	Lead role; TV movie	
2024	Believe: A Bridge to You	Masaoki Kuroki/Hiromichi Wakamatsu		
2024	Like a Dragon: Yakuza	Kazuma Kiryu	Lead role	
2025	The Way of the Police Officer	Akihiro Munakata	Lead role; TV movie	
2025	Then You Try Making It!	Katsuo Ebihara	Lead role	
2026	Silent Truth	Jun'ichi Tobina	Lead role	

=== Dubbing roles ===
Year	Title	Role	Voice dub for	Notes	Ref(s)
2019	Detective Pikachu	Tim Goodman	Justice Smith		

=== Music video appearances ===
Year	Song	Artist	Ref(s)
2016	Kiseki-To the Future	Whiteeeen	
2018	I Want You Back	Twice	

== Awards and nominations ==
Year	Award	Category	Work	Result	Ref(s)
2017	30th Nikkan Sports Film Award	Yūjirō Ishihara Newcomer Award	Teiichi: Battle of Supreme High	Won	
2018	72nd Mainichi Film Awards	Best New Actor	Teiichi: Battle of Supreme High	Nominated	
2018	41st Japan Academy Film Prize	Newcomer of the Year	Teiichi: Battle of Supreme High	Won	
2018	42nd Elan d'or Awards	Newcomer of the Year	Himself	Won	
2018	GQ Men of the Year 2018	Actor of the Year	Himself	Won	

== Stage performances ==
- 2021 ミュージカル「17 AGAIN」/ Musical '17 AGAIN' role: Mike O'Donnell / Mark (Lead)

== Bibliography ==
=== Photobooks ===
- Ryomania (Shufunotomo, July 31, 2015) ISBN 9784074123698
- 1mm (Shueisha, July 22, 2017) ISBN 9784087808186
- Ryoma Takeuchi (Magazine House, July 12, 2018) ISBN 9784838730094
