= Even If This Love Disappears From the World Tonight (2022 film) =

2022 film by Takahiro Miki

- Theatrical release poster
- Japanese: 今夜、世界からこの恋が消えても
- Directed by: Takahiro Miki
- Screenplay by: Sho Tsukikawa; Kana Matsumoto
- Based on: Even If This Love Disappears From the World Tonight by Misaki Ichijo
- Produced by: Kazuaki Kishida
- Starring: Shunsuke Michieda; Riko Fukumoto
- Cinematography: Hiroo Yanagida
- Edited by: Junnosuke Hogaki
- Music by: Seiji Kameda
- Production company: Toho Studios
- Distributed by: Toho
- Release date: 29 July 2022 (Japan)
- Running time: 121 minutes
- Country: Japan
- Language: Japanese

Even If This Love Disappears From the World Tonight (Japanese: 今夜、世界からこの恋が消えても, Hepburn: Konya, Sekai kara kono Koi ga Kietemo; lit. 'Tonight, Even If This Love Disappears From the World') is a 2022 Japanese romance film directed by Takahiro Miki, based on the novel of the same name. Produced under Toho Studios, it stars Shunsuke Michieda and Riko Fukumoto. The film was released theatrically on July 29, 2022.

== Original work ==
The film is based on the bestselling Japanese romance novel of the same name written by Misaki Ichijo. Published under Media Works Bunko, the novel won the prestigious 26th Dengeki Novel Prize, selected out of thousands of submissions. The book became a massive commercial phenomenon, selling over 1.3 million copies worldwide across Japan and South Korea, which paved the way for its successful film adaptations. Following the success of the original story, Ichijo also released a spin-off novel focusing on the character Izumi Wataya, titled Even If These Tears Disappear From the World Tonight.

== Cast ==
- Shunsuke Michieda
- Riko Fukumoto
- Kotone Furukawa
- Honoka Matsumoto
- Masato Hagiwara
- Maho Nonami
- Tôru Nomaguchi
- Maki Mizuno
- Koki Maeda
- Nishigaki Takumi
- Sho Nishigaki
- Ken Kurahara
- Toma Kajita
- Yō Akagi
- Raiju Kamata
- Yuzumi Shintani
- Kanon Nakazaki

== Production ==
=== Development ===
The film was officially announced with Takahiro Miki serving as director, and the script is penned by Sho Tsukikawa and Kana Matsumoto, while Toho Studios managed the production and music was composed by Seiji Kameda.

=== Casting ===
Shunsuke Michieda and Riko Fukumoto were cast in the lead roles, marking their second collaboration after My Love Mix-Up! (2021).

=== Filming ===
Principal photography of the film commenced in February 2022 and filming ended in March 2022. The filming took place in Chiba Prefecture and Kanagawa Prefecture.

== Music ==
Even If This Love Disappears From the World Tonight

Soundtrack album by Seiji Kameda
- Released: July 29, 2022
- Genre: Soundtrack
- Length: 1:05:16
- Language: Japanese
- Label: Rambling Records

The film features a theme song entitled "Left-Right Confusion" which was composed by N-buna and sung by Yorushika.

== Release ==
The trailer of the film was released on 24 March 2022. The film was screened in the Open Cinema section at the 27th Busan International Film Festival.

== Reception ==
=== Box office ===
The film was a commercial success, grossing over ¥1.53 billion ($11.5 million USD) in Japan.

Upon its theatrical release in South Korea on November 30, 2022, the film became a massive hit, accumulating over 1.21 million admissions. It became the first Japanese live-action film to surpass one million viewers in South Korea in 21 years, making it one of the highest-grossing Japanese live-action movies in the country's box-office history.

=== Accolades ===
Date	Award	Category	Recipients	Result	Ref.
2022	Nikkan Sports Film Awards	Newcomer Award	Shunsuke Michieda	Won	
2023	46th Japan Academy Film Prize	Newcomer of the Year	Riko Fukumoto	Nominated	
