= Love Me, Love Me Not (manga) =

Japanese manga series

- First tankōbon volume cover, featuring Yuna Ichihara and Akari Yamamoto

思い、思われ、ふり、ふられ (Omoi, Omoware, Furi, Furare)
- Genre: Coming-of-age; Drama; Romance
- Manga
- Written by: Io Sakisaka
- Published by: Shueisha
- English publisher: Viz Media
- Imprint: Margaret Comics
- Magazine: Bessatsu Margaret
- Original run: June 13, 2015 – May 13, 2019
- Volumes: 12
- Live-action film
- Directed by: Takahiro Miki
- Written by: Takahiro Miki; Yōko Yonaiyama
- Music by: Goro Ito; Akira Kosemura
- Released: August 14, 2020
- Runtime: 124 minutes
- Anime film
- Directed by: Toshimasa Kuroyanagi
- Written by: Erika Yoshida
- Music by: Yuuji Nomi
- Studio: A-1 Pictures
- Licensed by: BI: All the Anime
- Released: September 18, 2020
- Runtime: 103 minutes

Love Me, Love Me Not (Japanese: 思い、思われ、ふり、ふられ, Hepburn: Omoi, Omoware, Furi, Furare) is a Japanese manga series written and illustrated by Io Sakisaka. It was serialized in Shueisha's Bessatsu Margaret magazine from June 2015 to May 2019, with Its chapters collected in 12 tankōbon volumes. Viz Media licensed the manga in English release.

A live-action film adaptation opened in Japan in August 2020, while an anime film adaptation produced by A-1 Pictures premiered in September 2020.

By July 2020, the manga had over 5.5 million copies in circulation. In 2018, Love Me, Love Me Not won the 63rd Shogakukan Manga Award in the shōjo category.

== Plot ==
Yuna Ichihara is in the spring before her first year of high school and is pained to be separated from her best friend Sacchan who is moving away. On her way to the train station, she is stopped by a random girl named Akari Yamamoto, who asks her for money for her train fare. Although Yuna is somewhat afraid and reluctant, she gives the girl money, who in turn gives Yuna her bracelet as a promise that she will meet her tomorrow to pay her back. On the same day, Yuna runs twice into a boy who looks like the idolized prince of her childhood who she referred to as her first love. After that, the girl named Akari returns Yuna's money, and they head home together, only to find out that they live in the same apartment building. The girls instantly become friends. However, they find that they explore love in completely different ways, and Yuna may be in love with Akari's younger brother and Akari in love with Yuna's childhood friend.

== Characters ==
Yuna Ichihara (市原 由奈, Ichihara Yuna)
Voiced by: Marika Suzuki
Portrayed by: Riko Fukumoto
A shy girl who loves to read romance manga, but has never experienced love herself. Her best friend, Sacchan, moves away after they graduate middle school, and Yuna worries that she will be alone in high school. However, when she unexpectedly meets Akari at the train station and befriends her. Due to Yuna's wary and shy personality, she is initially suspicious of Akari following her home, when they are actually just neighbors in the same apartment building. She is in love with Rio, Akari's younger stepbrother. She confesses the first time but is rejected due to Rio's love for Akari. Later on, however, she confesses a second time and Rio happily accepts her as his girlfriend.
Akari Yamamoto (山本 朱里, Yamamoto Akari)
Voiced by: Megumi Han
Portrayed by: Minami Hamabe
Yuna's apartment neighbor who is also a first year in high school. She initially has a boyfriend at the beginning of the series, but he later breaks up with her. Her younger stepbrother is Rio, whom Yuna is in love with. She thinks that Yuna's childhood friend, Inui, is a good guy and initially tries to push the two together but stops when she finds out that Yuna is in love with Rio. She eventually grows closer to Inui and falls in love with him. Akari's mother married Rio's father near the beginning of the series, and hates that her mother doesn't trust her and Rio alone together. She pretends to not know that Rio loved her but actually has known since the beginning of the series. Both are able to reconcile, with the help of Yuna, which gives way for both to be able to move on. By the end of the manga, Akari is living in America with her parents and eagerly awaits Inui who has decided to move to America to be with her.
Rio Yamamoto (山本 理央, Yamamoto Rio)
Voiced by: Nobunaga Shimazaki
Portrayed by: Takumi Kitamura
Akari's younger stepbrother and the boy of Yuna's affection. He is asked out by many girls but claims he only likes pretty faces, and rejects the girls. He knew Akari before his father married her mother and was in love with her. Akari's mother knows this and is suspicious of Rio spending time alone with Akari. Rio develops a close friendship with Yuna early on in the series, often confiding in her when he found himself frustrated over Akari. He eventually falls for Yuna, but is hesitant to confess due to the fact that his friend has also fallen for Yuna. Both compete for her affection, but eventually he musters up the courage to confess at the same time that Yuna confesses to him that she is still in love with him. They become a couple and are happily attending college together at the end of the manga.
Kazuomi Inui (乾 和臣, Inui Kazuomi)
Voiced by: Soma Saito
Portrayed by: Eiji Akaso
Yuna's childhood friend. Akari describes him as a "good guy" and wishes that Yuna and him would get together. Inui has often been referred to as an "airhead" by Akari due to his carefree and sincere nature. He and Akari both develop feelings for each other, but he rejects her confession out of consideration for Rio's feelings. After he finds out Rio has moved on, he confesses to Akari. He faces some trouble when Akari's ex-boyfriend comes back into the picture and especially so when Akari decides to move to America, but he asks her to wait for him. By the end of the manga, he meets with Akari at the airport as he has decided to also live in America to pursue his dream and to be with her.

== Production ==
The series was announced in Bessatsu Margaret's June 2015 issue. Io Sakisaka reflected on plot lines in her previous series, Ao Haru Ride, and wanted to display love experiences in a different way. The original Japanese title was inspired by a tagline from an advertisement campaign for acne from the 1980s that became popular among schoolgirls; the tagline claimed certain locations of where acne appeared on the face foretold if the person or the person's admirer like or are ignoring each other.

== Media ==
=== Manga ===
Love Me, Love Me Not is written and illustrated by Io Sakisaka. It was serialized in Shueisha's Bessatsu Margaret magazine from June 13, 2015, to May 13, 2019. Its chapters were collected in twelve tankōbon volumes released from October 13, 2015, to June 25, 2019.

In North America, Viz Media licensed the series for English release. The first volume was released on March 3, 2020; and the last one was released on January 4, 2022.

==== Volume list ====
| No. | Original release date | Original ISBN | English release date | English ISBN |
|---|---|---|---|---|
| 1 | October 13, 2015 | 978-4-08-845467-2 | March 3, 2020 | 978-1-9747-1309-7 |
| 2 | February 25, 2016 | 978-4-08-845528-0 | May 5, 2020 | 978-1-9747-1310-3 |
| 3 | June 24, 2016 | 978-4-08-845596-9 | July 7, 2020 | 978-1-9747-1311-0 |
| 4 | October 25, 2016 | 978-4-08-845653-9 | September 1, 2020 | 978-1-9747-1312-7 |
| 5 | March 24, 2017 | 978-4-08-845732-1 | November 3, 2020 | 978-1-9747-1313-4 |
| 6 | August 25, 2017 | 978-4-08-845804-5 | January 5, 2021 | 978-1-9747-1314-1 |
| 7 | December 25, 2017 | 978-4-08-845868-7 | March 2, 2021 | 978-1-9747-1315-8 |
| 8 | April 25, 2018 | 978-4-08-844025-5 | May 4, 2021 | 978-1-9747-1316-5 |
| 9 | July 25, 2018 | 978-4-08-844066-8 | July 6, 2021 | 978-1-9747-1317-2 |
| 10 | October 25, 2018 | 978-4-08-844109-2 | September 7, 2021 | 978-1-9747-1318-9 |
| 11 | February 25, 2019 | 978-4-08-844172-6 | November 2, 2021 | 978-1-9747-1319-6 |
| 12 | June 25, 2019 | 978-4-08-844213-6 | January 4, 2022 | 978-1-9747-2092-7 |

=== Live-action film ===
A live-action film directed by Takahiro Miki was released on August 14, 2020. It stars Eiji Akaso as Kazuomi Inui and Minami Hamabe as Akari Yamamoto. Riko Fukumoto plays Yuna Ichihara and Takumi Kitamura plays Rio Yamamoto. Official Hige Dandism performed the theme song with "115man Kilo no Film".

=== Anime film ===
On April 22, 2019, it was announced by Shueisha that the series would receive an anime film adaptation by A-1 Pictures. It was originally scheduled to premiere on May 29, 2020, but was delayed to September 18, 2020, due to the COVID-19 pandemic in Japan. The film is directed by Toshimasa Kuroyanagi, with Erika Yoshida handling the film's scripts, Yuu Yamashita designing the characters, and Yuuji Nomi composing the film's music. The theme song for the film is "Gravity" by Bump of Chicken. The main cast members from the live-action film also have cameo roles in the film.

== Reception ==
Love Me, Love Me Not was awarded the 63rd Shogakukan Manga Award in the shōjo category in 2018. It was nominated for the 41st Kodansha Manga Award in the shōjo category in 2017. On Takarajimasha's Kono Manga ga Sugoi! ranking of top manga series of 2017 for female readers, the series ranked 9th.

By July 2020, Love Me, Love Me Not had over 5.5 million copies in circulation. Volume 3 of the series debuted at No. 4 on Oricon's Japanese Comic Ranking; and peaked at No. 2; and sold an estimated 325,010 copies. Volume 4 debuted at No. 1 and sold an estimated 168,863 copies in its first week alone. It sold an estimated 293,419 copies in a month and consistently ranked from October to November. Volume 5 debuted at No. 6, selling 110,175 copies; in its first week and peaking at No. 1 in its second week with 121,903 additional copies sold.
