= Meru Nukumi =

Japanese fashion model and actress (born 2002)

- 生見 愛瑠
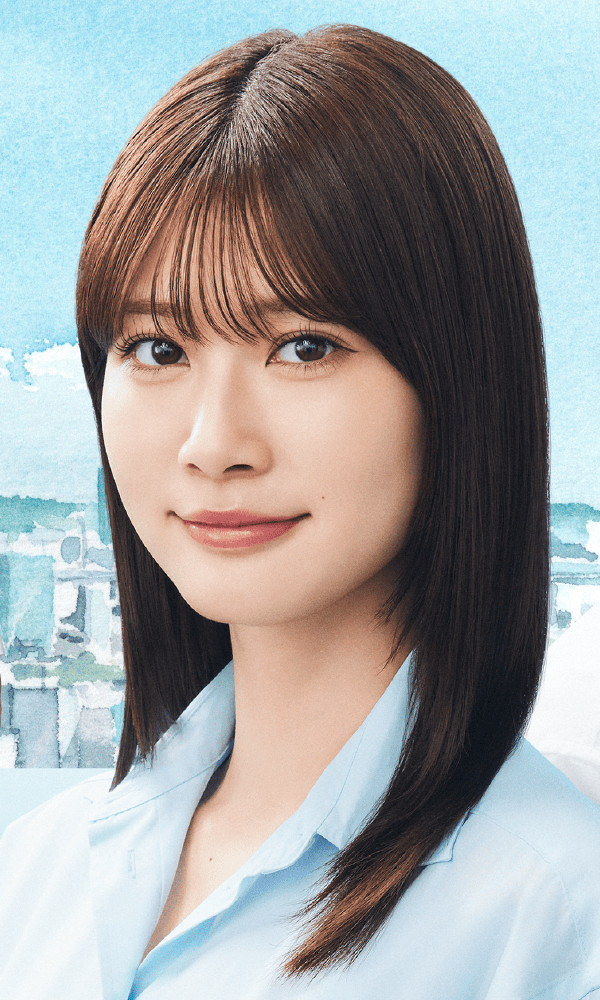
- Meru Nukumi in 2025
- Born: 6 March 2002 (age 24); Inazawa, Aichi Prefecture, Japan
- Other name: Meruru
- Occupations: Model; actress; tarento
- Years active: 2014–present
- Agent: Avex Management
- Height: 166 cm (5 ft 5 in)

Signature
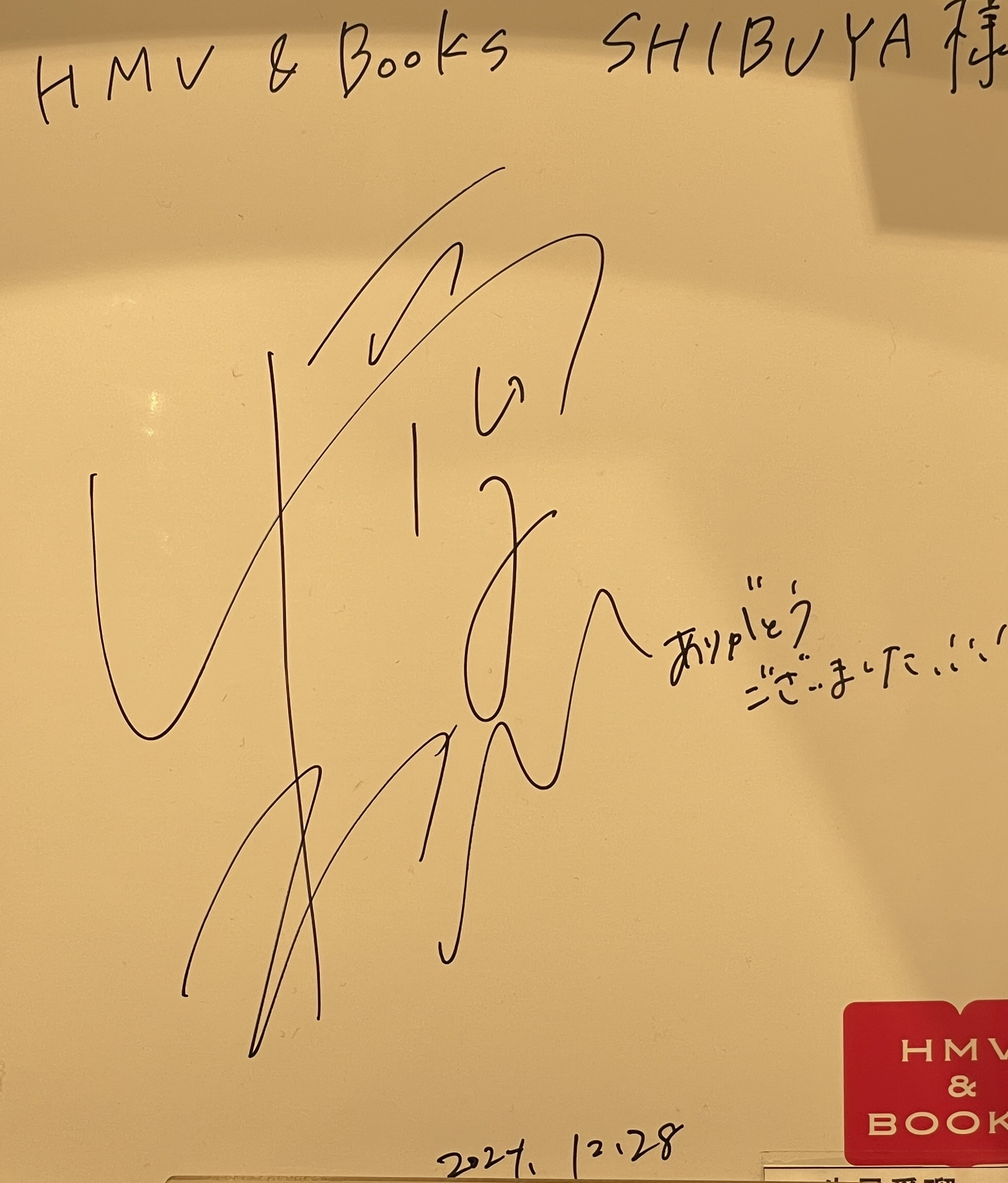

Meru Nukumi (生見 愛瑠, Nukumi Meru; born 6 March 2002), also known as Meruru, is a Japanese model, actress and tarento from Inazawa, Aichi Prefecture. She is represented by the talent agency Avex Management and is currently active in Tokyo. Nukumi was a former Popteen magazine model and is currently an exclusive model for the fashion magazine CanCam.

== Career ==
In 2015, Nukumi became an exclusive model for Popteen after participating in Tokyo Girls Audition 2015 and winning the Popteen and Ray awards. She graduated from Popteen in January 2021.

In March 2021, it was announced that Nukumi would become an exclusive model for the fashion magazine CanCam, first appearing on the March 23rd issue of the magazine.

In May 2024, it was announced that Nukumi would play the voice role of Anna Scervino in the anime film My Hero Academia: You're Next.

== Filmography ==
=== Film ===
Year	Title	Role	Notes	Ref.
2021	Healin' Good Precure: GoGo! Big Transformation! The Town of Dreams	Herself (voice)		
2022	My Boyfriend in Orange	Moe Sasaki		
2023	Yudo: The Way of the Bath	Maika Yokoyama		
2024	My Hero Academia: You're Next	Anna Scervino (voice)		
2025	Showtime 7	Chiharu Yūki		
2025	Tokyo MER: Mobile Emergency Room – Nankai Mission	Sora Chibana		
2026	The Last Song You Left Behind	Ayane Tosaka		
2026	Sakamoto Days	Osaragi		
2026	Tokyo MER: Mobile Emergency Room – Capital Crisis	Sora Chibana		

=== Television ===
Year	Title	Role	Notes	Ref.
2021	Oshare no Kotae ga Wakaranai	Kinomiya Akane	Lead role	
2021	Love's in Sight!	Hachiko Tōno		
2022	Ishiko and Haneo: You're Suing Me?	Kazuna Dōmae	Episode 4	
2023	At Least On Sunday Night	Wakaba Higuchi		
2023	Sexy Tanaka-san	Akari		
2023	Kazama Kimichika: Kyojo Zero	Chizuru Kayaba	Episode 4	
2024	Kururi: Who's in Love with Me	Makoto Ogata	Lead role	
2024	True Horror Stories: 25th-year Anniversary Special	Hatsune Yoshinaga	Lead role; short drama	
2026	Song of the Samurai	Makoto Ichikawa		
2026	Viral Hit	Kaho Asamiya		
2026	GTO	Mio Kashiwabara		

=== Dubbing ===
- A Minecraft Movie (Natalie (Emma Myers))

== Awards and nominations ==
Year	Award	Category	Work(s)	Result	Ref.
2023	46th Japan Academy Film Prize	Newcomer of the Year	My Boyfriend in Orange	Won	
2024	33rd TV Life Annual Drama Awards	Best Supporting Actress	At Least On Sunday Night	Won	
