= Shunsuke Michieda =

Japanese actor and singer (born 2002)

- 道枝 駿佑
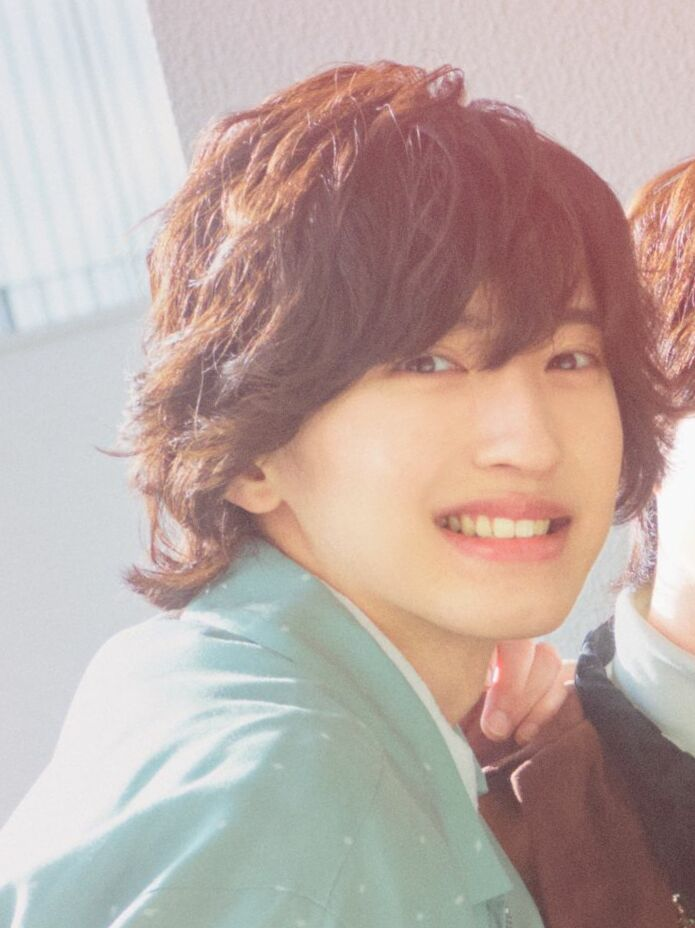
- Michieda in 2023
- Born: 25 July 2002 (age 24); Osaka Prefecture, Japan
- Other name: Micchi
- Occupations: actor; singer; dancer
- Years active: 2017–present
- Agent: Starto Entertainment
- Musical career
- Genre: J-pop
- Label: Storm Labels
- Member of: Naniwa Danshi
- Website: Naniwa Danshi (Storm Labels); Naniwa Danshi (Starto Entertainment)

Shunsuke Michieda (Japanese: 道枝 駿佑, romanized: Michieda Shunsuke, born July 25, 2002) is a Japanese actor, singer and television personality.

He is a member of the Japanese boy band Naniwa Danshi and is known for his roles in the television series The Files of Young Kindaichi and the film Even If This Love Disappears From the World Tonight.

He has gained significant popularity not only in Japan but also across Asia.

== Early life ==
Michieda was born in Osaka Prefecture, Japan. His mother is a big fan of SMAP, so he grew up listening to songs from SMAP and Hey! Say! JUMP from an early age and developed an interest in Johnny's idols. He was a fan of the 2014 drama The Files of Young Kindaichi, starring Ryosuke Yamada of Hey! Say! JUMP, and sent his resume to Johnny & Associates.

After sending his resume to Johnny & Associates four times, Michieda was contacted for an audition. He joined the agency on November 23, 2014. The audition footage was later broadcast on the Kansai TV program Maido! Johnny in 2015.

His first appearance at a concert was the Haruyasumi Kansai Johnny's Jr. Special show held in Osaka Shochikuza in March 2015. He worked as a backup dancer for Sexy Zone and A.B.C-Z.

== Career ==
Michieda made his television drama debut in the Nippon TV series Haha ni Naru in April 2017. In August of the same year, he made his film debut in Kansai Johnny's Jr. no Owarai Star Tanjō!. In August 2018, he made a guest appearance in the television series Zettai Reido, portraying a psychopathic high school student, a role that contrasted with his earlier image in Haha ni Naru.

In May 2018, he worked with Kento Nagao, now a fellow member of Naniwa Danshi, on Chibikko Owarai Shichihenka Shōnen KABUKI (Japanese: ちびっ子お笑い七変化 少年KABUKI).

In October 2018, Michieda was selected as a member of the Kansai Johnny's Jr. unit Naniwa Danshi.

In November 2019, he was ranked first in the NEXT category of the fashion magazine ViVi's "National Treasure Class Handsome Ranking".

In March 2020, Michieda joined the cast of the second season of BG: Personal Bodyguard, starring former SMAP member Takuya Kimura. He received a surprise birthday gift from the cast & crew of BG, an Italian bag delivered by Kimura himself. Michieda later said that he would treasure the gift, as he had looked up to Kimura since childhood.

On March 29, 2021, Michieda played Romeo in the stage production Romeo and Juliet, marking his first solo leading role in a stage play. On 12 November the same year, he officially debuted as a member of Naniwa Danshi with the single "Ubu Love".

In April 2022, Michieda appeared in the role of Hajime Kindaichi, the protagonist of The Files of Young Kindaichi. Regarding his decision to play the role, he said, "It's the work that inspired me to join Johnny's, and it's the work I've continuously said I wanted to do since I joined my agency, so I'm very happy that I've fulfilled my goal of seven years". On 14 July, he won first place in the NOW category of the voting project "National Treasure Class Handsome Ranking for the First Half of 2022" of ViVi. On 29 July, he played the lead role of Tōru Kamiya in Even If This Love Disappears from the World Tonight, marking his first starring role in a movie. For his performance, he received the Yūjirō Ishihara Newcomer Award at the Nikkan Sports Film Awards.

In 2024, Michieda starred in the television series Mars, his first leading role in a prime-time serial drama. He later won Best Actor at the 27th Nikkan Sports Drama Grand Prix for the role.

In March 2025, Michieda attended the Valentino Fall/Winter 2025–2026 show at Paris Fashion Week.

In July 2025, Michieda ranked first in the NOW category of ViVi's "National Treasure Class Handsome Ranking", entering the ranking's hall of fame.

In October 2025, he also attended the Valentino Spring/Summer 2026 show at Paris Fashion Week.

== Personal life ==
His name was chosen by his father and contains the kanji characters "駿 (shun)" because he was born in the year of the horse and "佑 (suke)" because he thought the kanji was cool. Michieda practices Aikido, which he learned from his first to sixth year of elementary school until he joined Johnny's.

== Filmography ==
=== Film ===
Year	Title	Role	Notes	Ref.
2017	Kansai Johnny's Jr. no Owarai Star Tanjō!	Yusuke Takahama (reminiscence)		
2020	461 Days of Bento: A Promise Between Father and Son	Kōki Suzumoto		
2021	99.9 Criminal Lawyer: The Movie	Mamoru Shigemori		
2022	Even If This Love Disappears From the World Tonight	Tōru Kamiya	Lead role	
2024	18×2 Beyond Youthful Days	Kōji	Taiwanese-Japanese film	
2026	The Last Song You Left Behind	Haruto Mizushima	Lead role	
2026	In the Clear Moonlit Dusk	Kohaku Ichimura	Lead role	
2027	Leviathan	Kazuma Ichinose	Lead role	

=== Television series ===
Year	Title	Role	Notes	Ref.
2017	My Son	Kō Kashiwazaki		
2017	Boku-ra no Yūki Miman City 2017	Takagi		
2019	Where Have My Skirts Gone?	Masayoshi Tōjō		
2020	Seiho Boys' High School!	Chikara Maki	Lead role	
2020	BG: Personal Bodyguard 2	Nakajima Kojiro		
2021	My Love Mix-Up!	Sota Aoki	Lead role	
2022	The Files of Young Kindaichi	Hajime Kindaichi	Lead role	
2023	Nijiiro no Chalk	Hiroto Ōmori	Lead role; television film	
2023	My Second Aoharu	Taku Ogasawara		
2024	Mars	Zero Mishima	Lead role	
2025	News Anchor	Yusuke Motohashi		

=== Concerts ===
Year	Title	Location	Ref.
21–31 March 2015	Kansai Johnny's Jr. Haruyasumi Kansai Johnny's Jr. Special show 2015	Osaka Shochikuza	
29 November – December 25, 2015	Kansai Johnny's Jr. X'mas Show 2015	Osaka Shochikuza	
31 March – April 11, 2016	Kansai Johnny's Jr. Haruyasumi Kansai Johnny's Jr. Special show 2016	Osaka Shochikuza	
30 November – December 25, 2016	Kansai Johnny's Jr. X'mas Show 2016	Osaka Shochikuza	

=== Stage play ===
Year	Title	Location	Ref.
2–26 August 2015	Shōnen-tachi: Sekai no Yume ga... Sensō o Shiranai Kodomo-tachi	Osaka Shochikuza	
2–26 August 2016	Another & Summer Show	Osaka Shochikuza	

=== Commercials and endorsements ===
Year	Brand	Product / Campaign	Notes	Ref.
2019–	SoftBank	"SoftBank Student Discount"		
2021–	Morinaga & Company	"Koeda"	Image character	
2025–	Morinaga & Company	"in Jelly (Fruit Texture)"		
2021–	Kenei Pharmaceutical	"Tepika Gel"		
2022–	Kenei Pharmaceutical	"Kenei Gargle"		
2023–	FineToday	"Sea Breeze"		
2023–	P&G	"Febreze"		
2024–	Yatsen Beauty Japan	"Perfect Diary"	Brand ambassador	
2026–	Toho Cinemas	Collaboration for Kimi ga Saigo ni Nokoshita Uta	Promotional campaign	
2026–	Hoya Corporation	"Eyecity"		
2026–	Benow Japan	"numbuzin"	Brand ambassador	

== Awards and nominations ==
Name of the award ceremony, year presented, category, nominee of the award, and the result of the nomination
Award ceremony	Year	Category	Nominee / Work	Result	Ref.
Hochi Film Awards	2022	Best Actor	Even If This Love Disappears From the World Tonight	Nominated	
Hochi Film Awards	2022	Best New Artist	Even If This Love Disappears From the World Tonight	Nominated	
Nikkan Sports Film Awards	2022	Yūjirō Ishihara Newcomer Award	Even If This Love Disappears From the World Tonight	Won	
Nikkan Sports Drama Grand Prix	2024	Best Actor	Mars	Won	
