= Shōjiki Fudōsan =

Japanese manga series

- First tankōbon volume cover

正直不動産
- Genre: Comedy, satire
- Manga
- Written by: Takeshi Natsuhara; Mitsuhiro Mizuno
- Illustrated by: Akira Ōtani
- Published by: Shogakukan
- Imprint: Big Comics
- Magazine: Big Comic
- Original run: June 9, 2017 – present
- Volumes: 25
- Television drama
- Directed by: Taisuke Kawamura; Tomoya Kanazawa; Kenta Noda
- Produced by: Sumire Shimizu; Takashi Utagawa
- Written by: Nemoto Nonji
- Music by: Toshihiko Sahashi
- Studio: Telepack; NHK Enterprises
- Original network: NHK General TV
- Original run: April 5, 2022 – March 12, 2024
- Episodes: 20
- Live-action film
- Directed by: Taisuke Kawamura
- Written by: Nemoto Nonji
- Music by: Toshihiko Sahashi
- Studio: Telepack; NHK Enterprises
- Released: May 15, 2026
- Runtime: 119 minutes

Shōjiki Fudōsan (正直不動産; lit. 'Honest Real Estate') is a Japanese manga series written by Mitsuhiro Mizuno and illustrated by Akira Ōtani based on a concept by Takeshi Natsuhara. It began serialization in Shogakukan's seinen manga magazine Big Comic in June 2017. A live-action television drama adaptation aired from April 2022 to March 2024. A live-action film opened in Japanese theaters in May 2026.

== Synopsis ==
The real estate industry is often referred to as the "thousand and three" industry, meaning that "out of a thousand words, there are only three truths." Saichi Nagase, who works in this industry, has achieved great sales results by lying willingly in order to secure a contract. However, after destroying a shrine during a groundbreaking ceremony, he has become unable to lie.

== Media ==
=== Manga ===
Written by Mitsuhiro Mizuno and illustrated by Akira Ōtani, and based on a concept by Takeshi Natsuhara, Shōjiki Fudōsan began serialization in Shogakukan's seinen manga magazine Big Comic on June 9, 2017. Its chapters have been compiled into twenty-five tankōbon volumes as of September 2026.

No.	Release date	ISBN
1	December 27, 2017	978-4-09-189700-8
2	April 27, 2018	978-4-09-189866-1
3	August 30, 2018	978-4-09-860069-4
4	December 27, 2018	978-4-09-860157-8
5	April 26, 2019	978-4-09-860305-3
6	August 30, 2019	978-4-09-860388-6
7	December 26, 2019	978-4-09-860471-5
8	April 27, 2020	978-4-09-860604-7
9	August 28, 2020	978-4-09-860705-1
10	December 25, 2020	978-4-09-860796-9
11	April 30, 2021	978-4-09-861026-6
12	August 30, 2021	978-4-09-861135-5
13	December 10, 2021	978-4-09-861230-7
14	March 30, 2022	978-4-09-861268-0
15	August 30, 2022	978-4-09-861403-5
16	December 28, 2022	978-4-09-861494-3
17	April 28, 2023	978-4-09-861697-8
18	September 8, 2023	978-4-09-862511-6
19	December 27, 2023	978-4-09-862628-1
20	May 30, 2024	978-4-09-862806-3
21	February 25, 2025	978-4-09-863040-0
22	September 30, 2025	978-4-09-863566-5
23	January 30, 2026	978-4-09-863769-0
24	May 8, 2026	978-4-09-864022-5
25	September 30, 2026	978-4-09-864118-5

=== Drama ===
A live-action television drama adaptation was announced on December 7, 2021. The drama starred Tomohisa Yamashita and Haruka Fukuhara in lead roles, and Hayato Ichihara, Rika Izumi, Shinobu Hasegawa, Houka Kinoshita, Kana Kurashina, Mao Daichi and Masao Kusakari in supporting roles. Ten episodes aired on NHK General TV from April 5 to June 7, 2022.

A television special aired on NHK General TV on January 3, 2024, and a 10-episode second season aired from January 9 to March 12.

=== Live-action film ===
A live-action film adaptation that serves as a continuation to the drama was announced in February 2025. The film premiered in Japanese theaters on May 15, 2026.

== Reception ==
The series was ranked 31st in Da Vinci's "Book of the Year" ranking in 2022. The series was nominated for the 69th Shogakukan Manga Awards in 2024.
