= My Love Mix-Up! =

Japanese manga series

- Cover of the first volume

消えた初恋 (Kieta Hatsukoi)
- Genre: Romantic comedy
- Manga
- Written by: Wataru Hinekure
- Illustrated by: Aruko
- Published by: Shueisha
- English publisher: NA: Viz Media
- Magazine: Bessatsu Margaret
- Original run: June 13, 2019 – June 13, 2022
- Volumes: 9
- Manga

Kieta Hatsukoi: Shōgekijō
- Written by: Wataru Hinekure
- Illustrated by: Aruko
- Published by: Shueisha
- Magazine: Bessatsu Margaret
- Original run: July 13, 2021 – September 13, 2021
- Television drama
- Directed by: Shōgo Kusano; Tadaaki Hōrai
- Written by: Tsutomu Kuroiwa
- Music by: Harumi Fuuki
- Licensed by: Viki
- Original network: TV Asahi
- Original run: October 9, 2021 – December 18, 2021
- Episodes: 10

My Love Mix-Up! (Japanese: 消えた初恋, Hepburn: Kieta Hatsukoi) is a Japanese manga series written by Wataru Hinekure and illustrated by Aruko. It was serialized in Bessatsu Margaret from June 2019 to June 2022. A spin-off, titled Kieta Hatsukoi: Shōgekijō, was serialized from July to September 2021. A Japanese live action television drama adaptation aired from October to December 2021 and a Thai television drama adaptation premiered in June 2024.

In 2022, My Love Mix-Up! won the 67th Shogakukan Manga Award in the shōjo category.

== Plot ==
Sota Aoki is a high school student who harbors romantic feelings for his classmate, Mio Hashimoto. During class, Hashimoto lends Aoki her eraser as an act of assistance. Upon examining it, Aoki notices the name "Ida" inscribed alongside a heart symbol. Coincidentally, Kōsuke Ida, another classmate, occupies the seat in front of Aoki. Aoki deduces that the eraser likely signifies Hashimoto's affection for Ida, leaving him disheartened.

When Ida observes the eraser in Aoki's possession, he misinterprets its meaning, assuming it belongs to Aoki and that the heart indicates Aoki's romantic interest in him. Unwilling to reveal Hashimoto's feelings, Aoki refrains from correcting the misunderstanding, leading Ida to remain under the false impression.

This chain of misinterpretations results in a series of awkward yet increasingly complex interactions, as the characters operate under conflicting assumptions regarding each other's intentions. Over time, the dynamic between Aoki and Ida shifts, fostering an unconventional rapport between them.

== Characters ==
Sota Aoki
Portrayed by: Shunsuke Michieda
Kōsuke Ida
Portrayed by: Ren Meguro
Mio Hashimoto
Portrayed by: Riko Fukumoto
Hayato "Akkun" Aida
Portrayed by: Jin Suzuki
Masahiro Taniguchi
Portrayed by: Seiichi Tanabe
Jun Tomita
Portrayed by: Ayumu Mochizuki
Taishō Nakabayashi
Portrayed by: Sho Nishigaki

== Media ==
=== Manga ===
The series is written by Wataru Hinekure and illustrated by Aruko. It began serialization in Bessatsu Margaret on June 13, 2019. The series completed its serialization on June 13, 2022. In June 2021, it was revealed the series would get a short spin-off titled Kieta Hatsukoi: Shōgekijō, which started serialization in the same magazine as the main series on July 13, 2021. It ended serialization on September 13, 2021. The main series' individual chapters have been collected into nine tankōbon volumes.

In February 2021, Viz Media announced they licensed the series for English publication.

==== Volume list ====
No.	Original release date	Original ISBN	English release date	English ISBN
1	November 25, 2019	978-4-08-844272-3	October 5, 2021	978-1-97-472527-4
Chapter 1; Chapter 2; Chapter 3; Chapter 4; Chapter 5
2	March 25, 2020	978-4-08-844318-8	January 4, 2022	978-1-9747-2528-1
Chapter 6; Chapter 7; Chapter 8; Chapter 9
3	July 22, 2020	978-4-08-844365-2	April 5, 2022	978-1-9747-2541-0
Chapter 10; Chapter 11; Chapter 12; Chapter 13
4	November 25, 2020	978-4-08-844388-1	July 5, 2022	978-1-9747-2658-5
Chapter 14; Chapter 15; Chapter 16; Chapter 17
5	March 25, 2021	978-4-08-844478-9	October 4, 2022	978-1-9747-2721-6
Chapter 18; Chapter 19; Chapter 20; Chapter 21
6	August 25, 2021	978-4-08-844504-5	January 3, 2023	978-1-9747-3240-1
Chapter 22; Chapter 23; Chapter 24; Chapter 25
7	October 25, 2021	978-4-08-844543-4	April 4, 2023	978-1-9747-3394-1
Chapter 26; Chapter 27; Chapter 28
8	March 25, 2022	978-4-08-844602-8	July 4, 2023	978-1-9747-3636-2
Chapter 29; Chapter 30; Chapter 31; Chapter 32
9	July 25, 2022	978-4-08-844688-2	October 3, 2023	978-1-9747-4065-9
Chapter 33; Chapter 34; Chapter 35

=== TV dramas ===
A Japanese live-action TV drama adaptation was announced in August 2021. The series was directed by Shōgo Kusano and Tadaaki Hōrai, with scripts by Tsutomu Kuroiwa, and Harumi Fuuki composing the music. Ren Meguro and Shunsuke Michieda performed the leads. It aired on TV Asahi from October 9 to December 18, 2021, for ten episodes. Viki licensed the series for an English release.

A Thai television drama adaptation, produced by GMMTV, was announced on October 17, 2023, and premiered on June 7, 2024.

== Reception ==
My Love Mix-Up! won the 67th Shogakukan Manga Award in the shōjo category in 2022. In the 2021 edition of the Kono Manga ga Sugoi! guidebook, the series tied with A Sign of Affection as the ninth highest ranked manga for female audiences. The series was also nominated for the first Ebook Japan manga award.

The Japanese television drama series was featured on Teen Vogue's best BL dramas of 2021 list.
