= Chronicles of the Going Home Club =

Japanese manga series

- Cover of the first manga volume

帰宅部活動記録 (Kitakubu Katsudō Kiroku)
- Genre: Comedy, school story
- Manga
- Written by: Kuroha
- Published by: Square Enix
- Magazine: Gangan Online
- Original run: August 18, 2011 – June 26, 2014
- Volumes: 5
- Anime television series
- Directed by: Hikaru Sato
- Written by: Gō Zappa
- Music by: Go Sakabe
- Studio: Nomad
- Licensed by: Crunchyroll (streaming); NA: NIS America
- Original network: Nippon TV
- Original run: July 4, 2013 – October 11, 2013
- Episodes: 12

Chronicles of the Going Home Club (Japanese: 帰宅部活動記録, Hepburn: Kitakubu Katsudō Kiroku) is a Japanese manga series written and illustrated by Kuroha. It was serialized by Square Enix's Gangan Online service. A 12-episode anime television series adaptation by Nomad aired between July and October 2013.

== Plot ==
The story follows a group of high school girls who are in the 'Going-Home Club'. Instead of doing regular club activities, the 'Going-Home Club' is dedicated to having as much fun as possible, by doing such things as playing video games or even simply feeding pigeons in the park.

== Characters ==
Natsuki Ando (安藤 夏希, Andō Natsuki)
Voiced by: Ibuki Kido
One of two freshman who joined the Going Home Club at the start of the school year. She is the member of the club with a straight and serious personality and she generally does not get the jokes that the club members are giving.
Karin Tono (塔野 花梨, Tōno Karin)
Voiced by: Mizuki Yuina
Supervisor of the Going Home Club and the other new member at the start of the school year. She is airheaded, but is excellent at home economics. She joined the Going Home Club because she could not decide between joining the Handicraft Club or the Cooking Club. Her cute looks are greatly admired by the club members to the point that it has become Botan's biggest weakness.
Sakura Domyoji (道明寺 桜, Dōmyōji Sakura)
Voiced by: Miharu Kobayashi
The president of the Going Home Club. She is the self-proclaimed ordinary girl of the club. She has an energetic personality.
Claire Kokonoe (九重 クレア, Kokonoe Claire)
Voiced by: Sayaka Senbongi
Treasurer of the Going Home Club. She is the heiress to her family's mega-corporation. She enrolled at the school because she wanted a normal school life.
Botan Ohagi (大萩 牡丹, Ōhagi Botan)
Voiced by: Sae Aiuchi
Commander of the Going Home Club. She is an expert in various martial arts as she is the successor to an ancient martial arts school. Her skills are so highly developed that other kids became afraid of her until meeting Sakura. Despite being invincible, Karin's cuteness has proven to be her Achilles' heel.
The Seal (あざらし, Azarashi)
Voiced by: M.A.O
The mascot of the club, yet it is not perceived by other members. It also acts as narrator in some situations.

== Media ==
=== Manga ===
No.	Japanese release date	Japanese ISBN
1	May 22, 2012	978-4-75-753598-5
01. "Go-Home Club Applicants" (帰宅部入部希望, Kitakubu Nyūbu Kibōu); 02. "Life is Short; Go Home, Young Lady" (命短し帰れよ乙女, Inochi Mijikashi Kaere yo Otome); 03. "Beware of Hagizuki-ryuu Practitioners" (萩月流出没注意, Hagizuki-ryuu Shutsubotsu Chūi); 04. "Extravagant Youth: Priceless" (浪費した青春...プライスレス, Rōhi-shita Seishun... Puraisuresu); 05. "If the Cuckoo Won't Sing, It's Probably Dead" (ホトトギスはなかないただのしかばねのようだ, Hototogisu wa Nakanai Tada no Shikabane no Yō da); 06. "Judge People by Appearances" (人は見かけによれ, Hito wa Mikake ni Yore); 07. "Girl Power Overdrive" (女子力オーバードライブ, Joshi-ryoku Ōbā Doraibu); 08. "The Demon King's Dignity" (魔王の品格, Maō no Hinkaku); 09. "Recommended Literature" (文学のすゝめ, Bungaku no Susume); 10. "Social Mixer Training" (合コン訓練, Gōkon Kunren); 11. "Kill the Suspicious Person!!" (不審者を殺せ！！, Fushin-sha o Korose!!); 12. "Fundamentals of a Retool" (テコ入れの原理, Tekoire no Genri); 13. "A Candy For a Cute Girl" (可愛い子には飴をあげよ, Kawaī Ko ni wa Ame o Ageyo)
2	November 22, 2012	978-4-75-753784-2
14. "Youth is an Explosion" (青春は爆発だ, Seishun wa Bakuhatsu da); 15. "Sealed Words!!" (封じられた言葉！！, Fūjirareta Kotoba!!); 16. "The Fierce Battle's Conclusion!!" (激闘の果て！！, Gekitō no Hate!!); 17. "Variety Gift" (バラエティギフト, Baraeti Gifuto); 18. "The Nameless Landmark" (名も無き目印, Na mo naki Mejirushi); 19. "Middle School Diary" (中学生日記(ブラック・ダイアリー), Chūgakusei Nikki (Burakku Daiarī)); 20. "Vaguely Remembered Fairy-tale Book" (うろおぼえ御伽草子, Uro Oboe Otogizoushi); 21. "The 18th Imitation Quiz Tournament" (第18回ものまねあてクイズ大会, Dai Jū-hakkai Mono Mane Ate Kuizu Taikai); 22. "The Fear of Urban Legends" (都市伝説の恐怖, Toshi Densetsu no Kyōfu); 23. "Bound by School Rules" (校則の縛り, Kōsoku no Shibari); 24. "Ultimate Decision" (至高の選択, Shikō no Sentaku)
3	June 22, 2013	978-4-75-753986-0
25. "The Four Heavenly Kings of Hagishirabe-ryū" (萩調流四天王, Hagishirabe-ryū Shiten'nō); 26. "Dead Freedom" (デッド・フリーダム, Deddo Furīdamu); 27. "Peak of Laughter" (笑いの頂上(テッペン), Warai no Teppen); 28. "Friendship Wears Away a Stone" (友情岩を穿つ, Yūjōgan o Ugatsu); 29. "SS Collection" (SS (エスエス)コレクション, Esu Esu Korekushon); 30. "Big Sister and Little Brother" (姉と弟, Ane to Otōto); 31. "Big Sister and Friends" (姉と友達, Ane to Tomodachi); 32. "Fierce Battle! The First Term Sports Tournament" (熱闘！！前期球技大会, Nettō!! Zenki Kyūgi Taikai); 33. "Burn!! Disaster Prevention Soul" (燃えろ！！防災魂, Moero!! Bōsai Tamashī); 34. "Mankind's Greatest Invention Is Air Conditioner" (人類最大の発明はクーラー, Jinrui Saidai no Hatsumei wa Kūrā); 35. "Guilty Judge" (ギルティ・ジャッジ, Giruti Jajji); 36. "Field Trip!! The Ancient Art of Hagishirabe-ryū" (見学！！萩調流古武術, Kengaku!! Hagishirabe-ryū Kobujutsu); 37. "Surprise Party" (サプライズ・パーティー, Sapuraizu Pātī); 38. "I Won't Give It Up" (「ゆずらない」, Yuzuranai)
4	December 21, 2013	978-4-75-754172-6
39. "Decide!! Bullet Shoot!!" (決めろ！！弾丸シュート！！, Kimero!! Dangan Shūto!!); 40. "Starry Sky Imagination" (星空イマジネーション, Hoshizora Imajinēshon); 41. "Names of Flowers" (花の名前, Hana no Namae); 42. "Street Poem" (ストリート・ポエム, Sutorīto Poemu); 43. "Ideal Equality" (理想的平等, Risouteki Byōdō); 44. "Adored Rockstar" (憧れのロックスター, Akogare no Rokkusutā); 45. "Media Intersection" (メディア交差点, Media Kōsaten); 46. "Black Demon Insect" (ブラック・ディーモンズ・インセクト, Burakku Dīmon Insekuto); 47. "Out of Sight Underground Website" (裏の裏サイト, Ura no Urasaito); 48. "The Town Early for a High School Student" (高校生には早い街, Kōkōsei ni wa Hayai Machi); 49. "Daily Life With Furuhashi-san" (古橋さんのいる日常, Furuhashi-san no Iru Nichijō); 50. "Memhories of Summer" (夏の思ひ出, Natsu no Omohide); 51. "Student Council Regular Staff Meeting" (生徒会定例役員会議, Seitokai Teirei Yakuin Kaigi)
5	July 22, 2014	978-4-75-754351-5
52. "Seven Wonders Adventure" (七不思議アドベンチャー, Nanafushigi Adobenchā); 53. "The Four Heavenly Kings of Hagishirabe-ryū: Origin Chapter" (萩調流四天王～因縁編～, Hagishirabe-ryū Shiten'nō: In'nen-hen); 54. "Deep Autumn" (秋深き, Aki Fukaki); 55. "More Than a Friend, Less Than a Nemesis" (友達以上宿敵未満, Tomodachi Ijō Shukuteki Miman); 56. "Girl Power Correction Meeting" (女子力添削会, Joshi-ryoku Tensakukai); 57. "Christmas Dress Code" (クリスマス・ドレスコード, Kurisumasu Doresukōdo); 58. "Killing Eleven" (キリング・イレブン, Kiringu Irebun); 59. "Discipline Rebellion" (風紀の乱, Fūki no Ran); 60. "Abyss of Laughter" (笑いの深淵, Warai no Shin'en); 61. "It's Like Giving a Peashooter to a Demon" (鬼に豆鉄砲, "Oni ni Mamedeppō"); 62. "Instant Best!" (即席一番！, Sokuseki Ichiban!); 63. "Overheating Rampage" (過熱暴走《オーバーヒート》, Kanetsu Bōsō); 64. "Greatest Hits" (グレイテスト・ヒッツ, Gureitesuto Hittsu); 65. "And Then, The Never-Ending After School" (そして、終わらない放課後, Soshite, Owaranai Houkago)

=== Anime ===
An anime television series, directed by Hikaru Sato and produced by Nomad aired from July 4 to October 11, 2013, Nippon TV. The series has been streamed by Crunchyroll. The opening theme is "Nigakki Debut Daisakusen!!" (2学期デビュー大作戦!!) by Otome Shintō (Ayame Tajiri, Chika Arakawa, Wakana Aoi and Yurika Takahashi). NIS America later added the Chronicles of the Going Home Club anime set for both retail and streaming release.
