= Mizuki Yuina =

Japanese voice actress and singer

- 結名 美月
- Born: 19 December 1995 (age 30); Gunma Prefecture, Japan
- Occupation: Voice actress
- Years active: 2013–present
- Employer: VIMS
- Notable work: Karin Tono in Chronicles of the Going Home Club; Kiriko Yukoku in The Idolmaster Shiny Colors; Shizuku Utsumi in Extreme Hearts

Mizuki Yuina (Japanese: 結名 美月, Hepburn: Yuina Mizuki; born 19 December 1995) is a Japanese voice actress affiliated with VIMS. She is known for voicing Karin Tono in Chronicles of the Going Home Club, Kiriko Yukoku in The Idolmaster Shiny Colors, and Shizuku Utsumi in Extreme Hearts.

== Biography ==
Mizuki Yuina was born on 19 December 1995 in Gunma Prefecture and raised in Saitama Prefecture and Tokyo. She was educated at the Japan Narration Actor Institute and joined VIMS.

In 2013, Yuina voiced Karin Tono, a main character in Chronicles of the Going Home Club. She has also voiced minor characters in Love Live! Sunshine!!, Shōnen Maid, Blend S, Ensemble Stars!, Kaguya-sama: Love Is War, Smile Down the Runway, and Shikimori's Not Just a Cutie.

Yuina voices Kiriko Yukoku, one of the five members of the unit L'Antica, in The Idolmaster Shiny Colors, a spinoff of The Idolmaster franchise. As part of the franchise, she performed in several of L'Antica's singles, two of which reached the Top 10 in the Oricon Singles Chart. She reprised her role in the 2024 anime adaptation.

In 2022, Yuina starred as Shizuku Utsumi in Extreme Hearts, and she appeared as part of their music releases. She is also part of Flowords, a voice actor unit by Animate's subsidiary Marine Entertainment.

Yuina holds a nursery teacher qualification.

== Filmography ==
=== Animated television ===
2013

- Chronicles of the Going Home Club, Karin Tono

2016

- Love Live! Sunshine!!, female student
- Shōnen Maid, girl

2017

- Blend S, elementary school student

2019

- Ensemble Stars!, spectator

2020

- Kaguya-sama: Love Is War, female student
- Smile Down the Runway, Mika

2022

- Shikimori's Not Just a Cutie, female student

=== Video games ===
2016

- Genjū-hime, Enki-sama

2018

- Hentai Shōjo: Formation Girls, Miryū Buden
- Mirrors Crossing, Melissa, Crawler
- The Idolmaster Shiny Colors, Kiriko Yukoku

2021

- Paradigm Paradox, Sena
