= Takurō Ōno =

Japanese actor and talent

- 大野拓朗
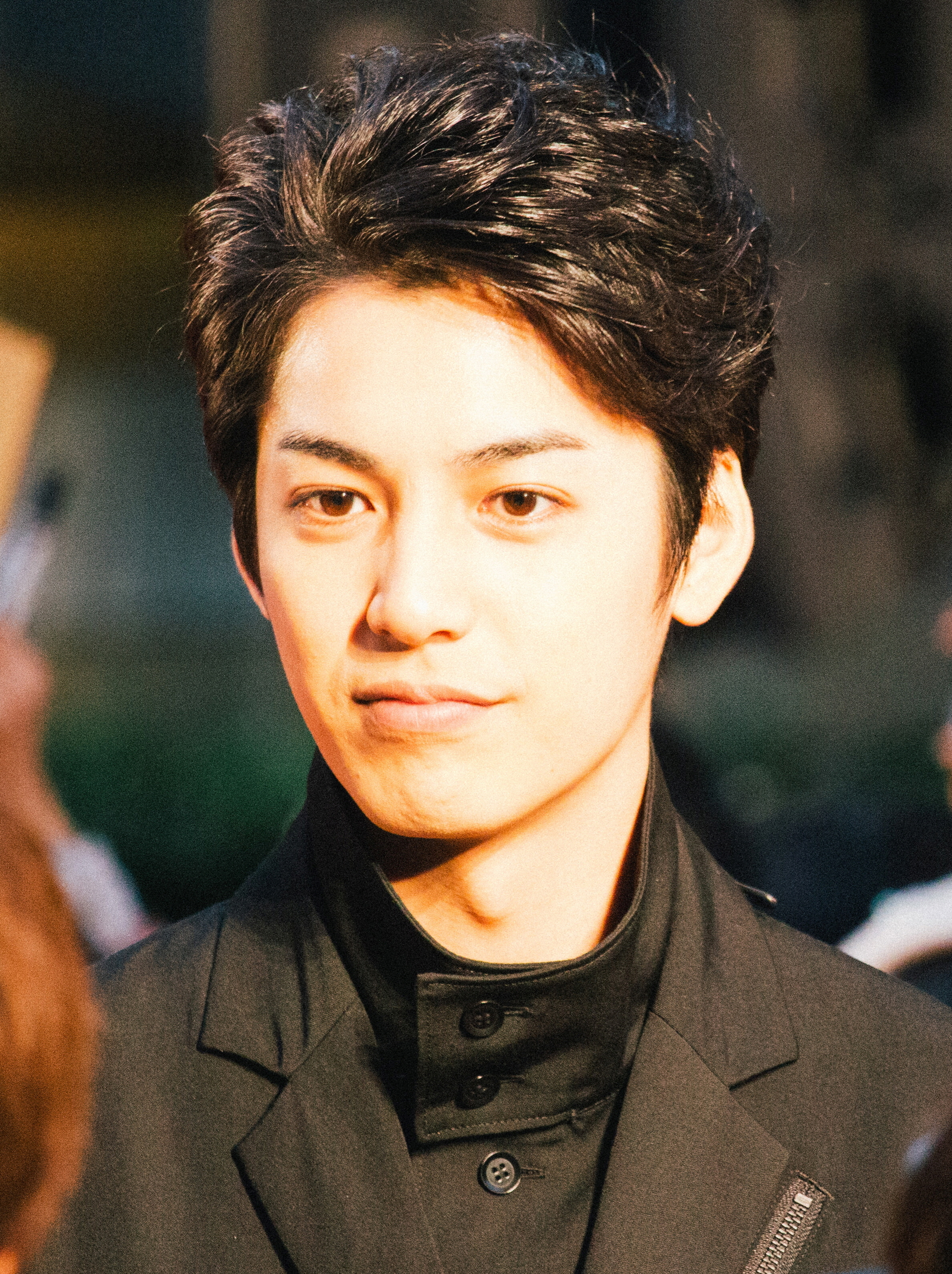
- Ōno at the 27th Tokyo International Film Festival, 2014
- Born: November 14, 1988 (age 37); Itabashi Ward, Tokyo, Japan
- Occupations: Actor and teleivison personality
- Years active: 2010–present
- Organization: Indigo Magic Orchestra
- Notable work: The Incite Mill; Misaki Number One; Liar Game: Reborn
- Height: 1.84 m (6 ft 1/2 in)

Takurō Ōno (大野 拓朗, Ōno Takurō) (also spelt Ohno), born November 14, 1988, is a Japanese actor and talent. He has had roles in such films as The Incite Mill and Liar Game: Reborn.

== Filmography ==
=== Film ===
- The Incite Mill (2010) – Yukito Maki
- Liar Game: Reborn (2012) – Tatsushi Wada
- Saitama kazoku (2013)
- Black Butler (2014) – Takaaki Matsumiya
- Nutcracker Fantasy (2014)
- Sailor Suit and Machine Gun: Graduation (2016)
- Kōdai-ke no Hitobito (2016)
- Survival Family (2017)
- The Travelling Cat Chronicles (2018)

=== Television ===
- Kokoro Yusabure! Sempai Rock You (2011) – Himself
- Misaki Number One (2011) – Yuto Hoshida
- Bull Doctor (2012) – Shunsuke Fujimura
- The Higashino Keigo Mysteries (2012)
- Nekketsu Kouha Kunio-kun (2013) – Kunio Fu'unji and Hell (unmasked)
- SPEC:Zero (2013 TV Movie)
- Onna Rule (2013) – Hayato Kozuka
- Sanbiki no ossan (2013) – Yuki
- Hana Moyu (2015) – Yasushi Nomura
- Toto Neechan (2015) – Kiyoshi Aoyagi
- Warotenka (2017–18) – Keith
- Segodon (2018) – Kirino Toshiaki
