= Have a Song on Your Lips =

- Film poster advertising Kuchibiru ni uta o in Japan
- Directed by: Takahiro Miki
- Written by: Yūichi Toyone; Yukiko Mochiji
- Based on: Kuchibiru ni uta o by Eiichi Nakata
- Produced by: Masao Teshima; Shūichi Nagasawa; Masahiko Mizuguchi; Shinichirō Tsuzuki; Riichirō Nakamura
- Starring: Yui Aragaki; Fumino Kimura; Kenta Kiritani; Yuri Tsunematsu; Shōta Shimoda
- Cinematography: Kōichi Nakayama
- Edited by: Junichi Itō
- Music by: Suguru Matsutani
- Production company: Asmik Ace
- Distributed by: Asmik Ace
- Release date: February 28, 2015 (Japan)
- Running time: 132 minutes
- Country: Japan
- Language: Japanese
- Box office: ¥386 million

Have a Song on Your Lips (くちびるに歌を, Kuchibiru ni uta o) is a 2015 Japanese film directed by Takahiro Miki and based on a novel of the same title by Eiichi Nakata (a/k/a Otsuichi) published in 2011. The original novel is inspired by a television documentary "Greetings to a 15 year old - Students on the island who walked with songs" (broadcast by NHK in May 2009), which depicts the interaction between Angela Aki (the songwriter of "Letter: Greetings to a 15 Year Old" which was an assigned song for the NHK National School Music Competition in 2008) and junior high school students on Wakamatsu Island in the Goto Islands of Nagasaki Prefecture. The novel has been adapted into a novel for children as well as a manga of the same title (by Taishi Mori). The film was released on February 28, 2015.

== Plot ==
Yuri Kashiwagi, a beautiful and talented pianist suddenly returns to her hometown in Goto Islands. She relieves her friend Haruko, who is on maternity leave, as the advisor for the school chorus. The choir aims to take part in NCon, a choir contest organised by Japanese public broadcaster NHK. However, her arrival attracts many male members to the choir. This creates friction within the previously all-female choir.

== Cast ==
- Yui Aragaki as Yuri Kashiwagi
- Fumino Kimura as Haruko Matsuyama
- Kenta Kiritani as Tetsuo Tsukamoto
- Kazumasa Taguchi as Vice Principal
- Hikari Ishida as Shizuru Nakamura
- Tae Kimura as Akiko Kuwabara
- Hisashi Igawa as Toshio Nakamura
- Yuri Tsunematsu as Nazuna Nakamura
- Shōta Shimoda as Satoru Kuwabara
- Wakana Aoi as Chinatsu Sekitani
- Kyoka Shibata as Eri Tsuji
- Mayu Yamaguchi as Kotomi Hasegawa
- Hayato Sano as Keisuke Mukai
- Hibiki Muroi as Riku Mitamura

== See also ==
- Cäsar Flaischlen: Have Sunshine in Your Heart — Part of the poem "Hab' ein Lied auf den Lippen, verlier nie den Mut, hab' Sonne im Herzen (Have a song on your lips, never lose heart, have sunshine in your heart)" is quoted in the film.
