= NakiNagi =

Japanese manga series

- First tankōbon volume cover

ナキナギ
- Genre: Romantic comedy
- Manga
- Written by: Keigo Maki
- Published by: Kodansha
- English publisher: NA: Kodansha USA
- Imprint: Shōnen Magazine Comics
- Magazine: Magazine Pocket
- Original run: April 2, 2025 – January 28, 2026
- Volumes: 5
- icon

NakiNagi (ナキナギ) is a Japanese manga series written and illustrated by Keigo Maki. It was serialized on Kodansha's Magazine Pocket service from April 2025 to January 2026, with its chapters compiled into five volumes between July 2025 and April 2026.

== Plot ==
Nakika and Nagisa are two best friends studying at the same school. While Nagisa is a cheerful and friendly human, Nakika is actually a sea witch who came to the surface to understand humans and their emotions. Nagisa is in love with her classmate Mozaki and wants to get closer to him, but has lacked opportunities to do so. Nakika, being friends with Nagisa and wanting to help her, uses her powers to help Nagisa, using this as her opportunity to understand humans better.

== Characters ==
Nakika (ナキカ, Nakika)
A student and Nagisa's best friend. She is actually a witch who is studying at a human school to understand them better. She has a cool personality. She sometimes uses her powers to help Nagisa get closer to Mozaki. Among her powers is the ability to manifest octopus-like tentacles.
Nagisa (汀)
Nakika's best friend and a cheerful student. She has feelings for their classmate Mozaki. However, she also deeply cares about Nakika.
Mozaki (茂崎)
Nagisa and Nakika's classmate, whom Nagisa has feelings for.

== Development ==
Keigo Maki originally developed the idea for the series while working on the previous series Shikimori's Not Just a Cutie. Nakika was inspired by a doodle of a girl with an octopus tail that they posted on Twitter, with them fleshing out the story and characters as they went on. The original concept involved a male and female lead duo, but as they felt that this angle did not work, they made the second main character a female instead, becoming the basis for Nagisa. They went with a sea theme for the series, with Nakika being inspired by octopuses and Nagisa being inspired by dolphins, with the premise being inspired by his own fear of sea creatures.

In 2024, Maki released a one-shot titled SeaWITCH on the Magazine Pocket service; while the two main characters were also named Nakika and Nagisa, the two are otherwise unrelated, featuring different premises and being set in different universes. The series' architecture and themes were inspired by Denmark, given its association with The Little Mermaid, with Frederiksborg Castle being cited as an inspiration. Maki originally planned to visit Kiribati for research, knowing that its mythology included the octopus-like deity Na Kika, which served as the inspiration for Nakika's name, but gave up due to logistical reasons: they instead visited Kohama Island in Okinawa.

Maki aimed for the series to have a somewhat dark theme, being inspired by the idea of how sea creatures can appear friendly but can also be deadly. The contrast between the cheerful Nagisa and the cool, kuudere Nakika was meant to reflect this. Nakika was originally conceived as a tsundere and Nagisa as a male character with a dark past, but as Nakika was already the "dark" character, Nagisa was revised to be a cheerful girl to contrast with her.

== Publication ==
The series is written and illustrated by Keigo Maki, who previously serialized the manga Shikimori's Not Just a Cutie. It was serialized on Kodansha's Magazine Pocket online service from April 2, 2025, to January 28, 2026. It received a simultaneous English release on Kodansha's K Manga service. Its chapters were compiled into five tankōbon volumes between July 9, 2025, and April 9, 2026. The series is licensed in English by Kodansha USA.

No.	Original release date	Original ISBN	English release date	English ISBN
1	July 9, 2025	978-4-06-540011-1	November 17, 2026	979-8-88-877948-4
2	October 9, 2025	978-4-06-540705-9	—	—
3	December 9, 2025	978-4-06-541898-7	—	—
4	April 9, 2026	978-4-06-543317-1	—	—
5	April 9, 2026	978-4-06-543451-2	—	—

== See also ==
- Shikimori's Not Just a Cutie, another manga series by the same author
