= Warotenka =

Japanese television drama

- Also known as: Laugh It Up!
- Original title: わろてんか
- Genre: Drama
- Written by: Tomoko Yoshida
- Directed by: Kazuhiro Motoki; Mitsuhiro Higashiyama; Hideaki Kawano
- Starring: Wakana Aoi; Tori Matsuzaka; Gaku Hamada; Issey Takahashi; Eri Tokunaga; Alice Hirose; Takashi Fujii; Moe Edamoto; Takuro Ono; Tomoya Maeno; Katsunori Uchiba; Satoru Matsuo; Honami Suzuki; Kyōka Suzuki; Keiko Takeshita; Kenichi Endō
- Narrated by: Fumie Ono
- Opening theme: "Ashita wa dokokara" by Takako Matsu
- Composer: Masaru Yokoyama
- Country of origin: Japan
- Original language: Japanese
- No. of episodes: 151

Production
- Executive producer: Takahisa Gotō
- Producer: Tomoki Nagatani
- Running time: 15 minutes
- Production company: NHK Osaka

Original release
- Network: NHK
- Release: October 2, 2017 – March 31, 2018

Warotenka (わろてんか, Laugh It Up!) is a Japanese historical drama television series and the 97th asadora series, following Hiyokko. It premiered on October 2, 2017, and ended on March 31, 2018. The main character is based on Sei Yoshimoto, the co-founder of Yoshimoto Kogyo, one of Japan's largest entertainment companies that especially focuses on comedy.

== Plot ==
Ten Fujioka is a young girl who lives in Kyoto in the late Meiji era and who loves to laugh. The daughter of a prominent pharmacist, one day she runs into a young entertainer, Tōkichi Kitamura, who leaves a strong impression on her. Nearly a decade later, she runs into Tokichi again, and finds out that, while never succeeding as an entertainer, he is the eldest son of a prominent rice merchant in Osaka. Against her parents wishes, who expects her to marry a man who will take over the family business, Ten decides to elope with Tōkichi. Her troubles have only started, however, as Tōkichi's mother Tsueko initially rejects Ten as a potential bride, and then the rice store goes bankrupt. Toki, her former maid in Kyoto, comes to help her. Reduced to living in a poor tenement, Ten and Tōkichi still borrow money from Ten's parents and buy a small yose (vaudeville hall) in the outskirts of Osaka. They encounter many difficulties in attracting customers and securing good entertainers, having to work through power-hungry brokers and convince competing factions of rakugo performers to support them. Fūta, who worked at the Kyoto pharmacy, first comes to work for the opposition and them switches sides to help Ten, whom he always liked. They begin to see success and buy other yose. Soon Kitamura Shoten comes to dominate the Osaka vaudeville scene and, on the occasion of the Great Kanto Earthquake extends its reach to Tokyo. Toki and Fūta end up marrying. Tōkichi, however, suffers a series of strokes. Fearing his death and hoping to leave a healthy business to Ten, he encourages his old vaudeville buddies Keith, Asari, and Manjōme to come up with a modern form of "talking" manzai, which becomes a huge hit. Tōkichi dies, leaving Ten to run a major business that is still threatened by new entertainments like the talkies. She brings in an old friend, Shiori Inō, who runs a movie studio, as an advisor, and he suggests she develop an entertainment only a woman could produce. Ten asks him to lend her Ririko, her former rival in love over Tōkichi, who is now a major movie star, and creates a new form "non-talking" manzai, with Ririko doing all the talking against her bumbling accordionist partner Shirō. The two eventually fall in love. Ten's son Shun'ya, being groomed to take over one day, proposes to put on a real American revue show, The Martin Show, that he saw in America. When he loses a bundle to a con man pretending to be the agent for the Martin Show, Shun'ya is punished, but he has fallen in love with Tsubaki, a woman who was an unwitting participant in the Martin Show affair. Her father, the president of the bank that provided loans to Kitamura Shoten, demands she marry the son of a business partner but she refuses and runs away, with Shun'ya following. Ten is forced to disown him. As the clouds of war approach, Kitamura Shoten is asked to send comedians to the front to entertain soldiers. The company also tries to enter the movie business, but when they try to bring in Inō as an advisor, after he was driven out of his own company due to his liberal world view, censors punish them and Inō has to leave for America. Shun'ya and many Kitamura comedians are drafted into the military, and air raids destroy many of Ten's theaters. She dissolves the company and escapes to the countryside until the end of the war. Returning to a burnt-out Osaka, Ten works with Fūta and Inō, newly returned from America, to rebuild Kitamura Shōten with a new comedy show.

== Cast ==
=== Main character ===
- Wakana Aoi as Ten Kitamura
  - Miu Arai as childhood Ten

=== Kyoto people ===
- Tori Matsuzaka as Tōkichi Kitamura, Ten's husband (based on Kichibei Yoshimoto, the founder of Yoshimoto Kogyo)
- Gaku Hamada as Fūta Takei, Ten's cousin
  - Fuku Suzuki as young Fūta
- Issey Takahashi as Shiori Inoo

==== Fujioka family ====
- Kenichi Endō as Gihee Fujioka, Ten's father
- Honami Suzuki as Shizu Fujioka, Ten's mother
- Keiko Takeshita as Hatsu Fujioka, Ten's grandmother
- Yudai Chiba as Shinichi Fujioka, Ten's brother
- Mayu Hotta as Rin Fujioka, Ten's sister
- Eri Tokunaga as Toki

=== Osaka people ===
- Kyōka Suzuki as Tsueko Kitamura, Tōkichi's mother
- Ryo Narita as Shun'ya Kitamura, Tōkichi and Ten's son
- Alice Hirose as Ririko Hatano, Ten's rival in love
  - Riti as childhood Ririko
- Takurō Ōno as Keith, Tōkichi and Ririko's entertainer fellow
  - Ōshirō Masuda as young Keith
- Tomoya Maeno as Asari, Keith's partner
- Takashi Fujii as Kichizō Manjōme, an entertainer
- Moe Edamoto as Utako Manjōme, Kichizō's wife
- Daiki Hyōdō as Gin Tera
- Katsunori Uchiba as Shōsuke Kamei
- Rei Okamoto as Kaede Sugita
- Satoru Matsuo as Shirō Kawakami, Ririko's partner
- Kyōka Minakami as Tsubaki Kanō

== Production ==
Filming began in Kyoto on May 19, 2017.

== Reception ==
Due to a notable increase in popularity of Japanese television morning dramas, the NHK Broadcasting Culture Research Institute decided to conduct a survey to investigate potential reasons. A majority of viewers gave Warotenka a "somewhat satisfactory" rating, highly appreciating its cheerful tone and supporting characters

Preceded by Hiyokko	Asadora; October 2, 2017 – March 31, 2018	Succeeded by Half Blue Sky
