= Survival Family =

2017 Japanese drama comedy film

- DVD cover
- Directed by: Shinobu Yaguchi
- Written by: Shinobu Yaguchi
- Produced by: Takashi Ishihara; Minami Ichikawa; Kiyoshi Nagai
- Starring: Fumiyo Kohinata; Eri Fukatsu; Yuki Izumisawa; Wakana Aoi
- Cinematography: Takahito Kasai
- Edited by: Ryūji Miyajima
- Music by: Takuji Nomura
- Production companies: Altamira Pictures; Dentsu; Fuji Television
- Distributed by: Toho
- Release dates: December 11, 2016 (MIFF); February 11, 2017 (Japan)
- Running time: 117 minutes
- Country: Japan
- Language: Japanese

Survival Family (Japanese: サバイバルファミリー, Hepburn: Sabaibaru famirī) is a 2016 Japanese road drama comedy survival film directed by Shinobu Yaguchi. The film was produced by Takashi Ishihara, Minami Ichikawa, and Kiyoshi Nagai and premiered at the 2016 Macao International Film Festival (MIFF), before being released on Japanese theaters on February 11, 2017. The film centers on a modern Japanese suburban family facing their hardships as they traverse across Japan on bicycles amidst a nationwide blackout.

== Plot ==
In modern-day Japan, the hedonistic and dysfunctional middle-class Suzuki family – white-collar worker Yoshiyuki, his wife Mitsue, and their high school children, Kenji and Yui – resides in a suburban apartment complex in Tokyo, focusing on their own personal lives and hardly spending time with each other. The whole city inexplicably suffers a total blackout as all modern appliances and man-made infrastructure stops working.

His senior boss lays off all the workers and advises Yoshiyuki to head to the countryside until the power can be restored. Eventually, they decide to leave and head to Kagoshima, where Mitsue's father lives there. After initially heading to Haneda Airport to take flight, the Suzukis makes an arduous trek to Kagoshima on bicycles–being one of the few modes of transportation that can operate without electricity. When they rest at a highway stop, one of the civilians asks if they could spare some water, but Yoshiyuki–wanting to save as much food and water as possible–claims that they only had their last bottle. That night however, one of the bottles was stolen by a thief while they are sleeping. Kenji gives chase, but upon noticing that the thief was actually a desperate husband who has a wife and a newborn child, he abandons the pursuit.

The family comes across a dark highway tunnel. A group of blind elderly women nearby offers the family a safe passage through the tunnel in exchange for food. When the water supplies ran dry, the family ducks underneath the bridge to seek shelter from a typhoon, but Yoshiyuki, having drank the water from the river, suffers from diarrhea. With all their clothes and the remaining supplies swept away by the storm; the Suzukis have to survive on eating pet food and battery water. Kenji's bike was damaged, but he was able to repair the bike using part of his phone case to repair the wheel.

They come across a survivalist Saito family, who survives on dried food and roadside weeds, before they eventually part ways as they decide to travel to Nagoya. The Suzukis comes across an aquarium at Osaka where the people line up for food, but unfortunately, all the food supply ran out. A depressed and exhausted Yoshiyuki spots and kills a pig on a nearby field, A resident from a nearby village, Zennichi Tanaka, cuts off the pig's organs and takes them inside his house, where he lived with his elderly wife. With his home stocked with smoked meat, the Suzukis indulgingly agree to work with Tanaka to help him out with his chores in exchange for eating his smoked meat for dinner.

A week later, with an extra supply of food, the Suzukis resume their journey, but they unexpectedly encountered a river with no bridge to cross. The family construct a makeshift raft to transport their supplies across the river, but they were caught in a rainstorm. The raft breaks apart and Yoshiyuki and all the bikes were swept away by the torrent and is presumed dead. Continuing on foot on the railroad tracks, Mitsue's ankle fractures as they were ambushed by the pack of dogs who were attracted by the smoked meat. A whistle from the steam locomotive scares off the dogs and the three was picked up by the passengers, with the attending doctor treating Mitsue's injuries.

Yoshiyuki, who is revealed to have survived, stumbles on an empty rice field when he sees the train and pops the flare. The family was reunited before the train arrives at Kagoshima, where Mitsue reconnects with their grandfather. More than two and a half years have passed since the outage, as Yoshiyuki wakes up the following morning, he hears the sounds of the alarm clock ringing and the music playing across the town. The whole family stares out in a mix of silent joy and confusion as the power is finally restored.

As the family returned to Tokyo, the news broadcast reveals that the whole phenomenon was caused by a solar flare, which remains under investigation. The film ends as Yoshiyuki, Mitsue, Kenji and Yui receives the photo from the Saito family, showing themselves standing on a highway.

== Cast ==
- Fumiyo Kohinata as Yoshiyuki Suzuki
- Eri Fukatsu as Mitsue Suzuki
- Yuki Izumisawa as Kenji Suzuki
- Wakana Aoi as Yui Suzuki
- Saburo Tokito as Toshio Saito
- Norika Fujiwara as Shizuko Saito
- Takurō Ōno as Ryosuke Saito
- Jun Shison as Shohei Saito
- Yasuo Daichi as Zennichi Tanaka
