= Extreme Hearts =

Japanese anime television series

- Key visual
- Genre: Sports, music
- Created by: Masaki Tsuzuki
- Anime television series
- Directed by: Junji Nishimura
- Written by: Masaki Tsuzuki
- Music by: Effy
- Studio: Seven Arcs
- Licensed by: Crunchyroll
- Original network: Tokyo MX, BS11, WOWOW
- Original run: July 10, 2022 – September 25, 2022
- Episodes: 12

Extreme Hearts is an original Japanese anime television series created and written by Masaki Tsuzuki, the creator of Magical Girl Lyrical Nanoha and Dog Days, directed by Junji Nishimura and animated by Seven Arcs, which aired from July to September 2022.

== Plot ==
In the near future, a trend in the sporting world is Hyper Sports, in which various sports are played with advanced equipment that enhance the player's abilities. One of the popular Hyper Sports leagues is Extreme Hearts, managed by a music company and composed of female idol groups across Japan.

After being released from her record label, failed artist Hiyori Hayama gets invited to join Extreme Hearts through her fan Saki Kodaka. Not wanting to give up on her music industry dreams yet and despite her inexperience with Hyper Sports, Hayama accepts the invitation and enlists the help of Kodaka and Sumika Maehara (later joined by Yukino Tachibana and Lise Kohinata). Together, they form the idol group RISE and their goal is to make it big in Extreme Hearts.

== Characters ==
=== RISE ===
Hiyori Hayama (葉山 陽和, Hayama Hiyori)
Voiced by: Ruriko Noguchi
She is a high school student and a guitarist. She originally came from Hokkaido but had moved to Kanagawa. Although she already made her solo debut, her career remained unsuccessful, leading to her label ending her contract. Not wanting to give up on music, her fan Saki introduced her to Extreme Hearts, a Hyper Sports league for idol groups. Outside of singing she also has a part-time delivery job.
Saki Kodaka (小鷹 咲希, Kodaka Saki)
Voiced by: Miho Okasaki
A middle school student and a fan of Hiyori's music. She has played football from a young age. She retired from playing but was regained motivation after meeting Hiyori for the first time.
Sumika Maehara (前原 純華, Maehara Sumika)
Voiced by: Kana Yūki
A high school student and a former baseball player. She is Saki's childhood friend.
Yukino Tachibana (橘 雪乃, Tachibana Yukino)
Voiced by: Ayaka Fukuhara
A high school student. Her family runs a dojo. Much is expected from her as her father and brother both died in an accident prior to the events of the series.
Lise Kohinata (小日向 理瀬, Kohinata Rise)
Voiced by: Ari Ozawa
A middle school student and karateka. She uploads her moves online but hasn't been able to gain much of a following. She retired from karate competitions due to an incident where she accidentally injured an opponent, which continued to haunt her until she was recruited by RISE.
QON-N4CX Nono (ノノ, Nono)
Voiced by: Chinami Hashimoto
A manager robot assigned to RISE.

=== May-Bee ===
An idol group that won the Kanagawa Tournament during the last 2 seasons of Extreme Hearts.

Hazuki Sakurai (桜井 羽月, Sakurai Hatsuki)
Voiced by: Rika Abe
The leader of the group. A first-year university student.
Tomo Miyashiro (御社 智, Miyashiro Tomo)
Voiced by: Saori Ōnishi
The sub-leader of the group.
Yuriko Suemune (末宗 祐里子, Suemune Yuriko)
Voiced by: Yō Taichi
The shortest member of May-Bee. Because of her height, she is often mistaken for a child.
Chihiro Honda (本田 千尋, Honda Chihiro)
Voiced by: Kaede Yuasa
Teena Merkies (ティーナ・メルキース, Tīna Merukīsu)
Voiced by: Tomomi Mineuchi (anime), Yurika Moriyama (audio drama)
The tallest member of May-Bee. She is from the Netherlands.
QON-N09M2 Sanae (サナエ, Sanae)
Voiced by: Ayaka Suwa
A manager robot assigned to May-Bee.
Shinji Ibuki (伊吹 慎二, Ibuki Shinji)
Voiced by: Junji Majima
The producer of May-Bee.

=== Smile Power ===
An idol group that specializes in theater arts.

Emi Hōjō (北条 恵美, Hōjō Emi)
Voiced by: Aya Suzaki
The leader of Smile Power. Although athletic, her poor health keeps her from participating in Hyper Sports games for long periods of time.
Aki Maeda (前田 亜紀, Maeda Aki)
Voiced by: Sayaka Kikuchi
Yuka Hashimoto (橋本 由香, Hashimoto Yuka)
Voiced by: Momo Higuchi
Mikoto Sawatari (沢渡 美琴, Sawatari Mikoto)
Voiced by: Yurika Takagi
Miyabi Takao (高尾 雅, Takao Miyabi)
Voiced by: Wakana Kuramochi
Miharu Tomonaga (友永 美晴, Tomonaga Miharu)
Voiced by: Chiemi Tanaka
Aiko Tsukahara (塚原 愛子, Tsukahara Aiko)
Voiced by: Asuka Nishi
A member who also serves as the co-manager of the group.
Shōko Sasaki (佐々木 尚子, Sasaki Shōko)
Voiced by: Hikari Kubota
The main manager of Smile Power.

=== LINK@Doll ===
An idol group that was ranked second in the Kanagawa Tournament during the last season of Extreme Hearts.

Maika Ayatsuji (綾辻 舞花, Ayatsuji Maika)
Voiced by: Haruka Yamazaki
The leader and center of LINK@Doll.
Shiina Miyamoto (宮本 椎奈, Miyamoto Shīna)
Voiced by: Kokoro Nanami
Shizuku Utsumi (内海 雫, Utsumi Shizuku)
Voiced by: Mizuki Yuina
Kotone Aiba (相庭 琴音, Aiba Kotone)
Voiced by: Mizue Tsunashima
Ema Baily (エマ・ベイリー, Ema Beirī)
Voiced by: Yuna Ogata
Anna Hanamizawa (花見沢 杏菜, Hanamizawa Anna)
Voiced by: Anzu Haruno
Lion Hasebe (長谷部 理音, Hasebe Rion)
Voiced by: Riona Imaizumi
A strategist for the group, she calls herself a team manager and a stage director.

=== BanShee ===
A kawaii metal idol band.

RiN / Rinko Nakahara (中原 倫子, Nakahara Rinko)
Voiced by: Yoko Hikasa
The vocalist and leader of the band.
NaO / Naomi Aida (相田 尚美, Aiba Naomi)
Voiced by: Aiko Ninomiya
The guitarist and sub-leader of the band.
SaKo / Hisako Mizoguchi (溝口 妃紗子, Mizoguchi Hisako)
Voiced by: Sayaka Senbongi
The bassist and main composer of the band.
Tenko (テンコ)
Kogata (コガタ)
SAWA
JOKER
KONY
Sumire (スミレ)
Akamaru (アカマル)
MINA

=== Snow Wolf ===
An idol duo composed of foreign talent and new to the Extreme Hearts league.

Michelle Jaeger (ミシェル・イェーガー, Misheru Yēgā)
Voiced by: Kana Ichinose
The guitarist and vocalist. She is of German descent. Her family runs a company that specializes in medical technology. Although physically weak, she is very smart and athletic. A fateful meeting with Ashley Vancroft made her interested in music, leading to the formation of Snow Wolf.
Ashley Vancroft (アシュリー・ヴァンクロフト, Ashurī Vankurofuto)
Voiced by: Asami Seto
The bassist and co-vocalist. She is a Brazilian American who went to Japan to study robotics. Michelle met her while working part-time at a robotics factory.
Reni (レニ)
Voiced by: Mari Hino
A manager robot assigned to Snow Wolf.

== Production and release ==
The original project created by Masaki Tsuzuki was originally announced on January 20, 2020, at the 15th anniversary concert of Magical Girl Lyrical Nanoha, although it doesn't directly confirm whether it would be related to Nanoha franchise or not. The title of the original project would eventually be revealed on May 20, 2021, as a new series, which was later revealed to be an anime television series on February 10, 2022. Junji Nishimura is directing the anime at Seven Arcs, with Tsuzuki writing the scripts, and Effy composing the music. Original character designs are provided by Waki Ikawa, while Issei Aragaki adapts the designs for animation. Aragaki and Kana Hashidate are serving as chief animation directors, and Shuichi Kawakami and Takuya Fujima drafted the sub-character designs. The series aired from July 10 to September 25, 2022, on Tokyo MX and BS11. The opening theme song is "Infinite" by Miho Okasaki, and the ending theme is "Sunrise" by RISE. Crunchyroll streamed the series outside of Asia.

=== Episodes ===
No.	Title	Directed by (Note: Information is taken from the ending credits of each episode.)	Storyboarded by	Original release date
1	"RISE"	Sachiko Kanno	Junji Nishimura, Tōru Yoshida	July 10, 2022
2	"Something I Can't Give Up"; Transliteration: "Yuzurenai Mono" (Japanese: 譲れないもの)	Seo Hye-Jin	Junji Nishimura, Tōru Yoshida	July 17, 2022
3	"Rise up Dream"	Sachiko Kanno	Junji Nishimura, Tōru Yoshida	July 24, 2022
4	"Meeting a New Face"; Transliteration: "Atarashii Deai" (Japanese: 新しい出会い)	Masahiro Hosoda	Masahiro Hosoda	July 31, 2022
5	"Samurai Heart"; Transliteration: "Samurai Hāto" (Japanese: サムライハート)	Tarō Kubo	Gōichi Iwahata	August 7, 2022
6	"The Sword of the Heart"; Transliteration: "Kokoro no Ken" (Japanese: 心の剣)	Takayuki Hamana	Takayuki Hamana	August 14, 2022
7	"Stand up & Fight"	Daisuke Tsukushi	Gōichi Iwahata	August 21, 2022
8	"Summertime Vacation"; Transliteration: "Samātaimu Bakēshon" (Japanese: サマータイム・バケーション)	Gorō Kuji	Gōichi Iwahata	August 28, 2022
9	"SNOW WOLF"	Masahiro Hosoda, Shin Itagaki	Masahiro Hosoda, Tōru Yoshida	September 4, 2022
10	"Promise"; Transliteration: "Yakusoku" (Japanese: 約束)	Gorō Kuji	Gorō Kuji	September 11, 2022
11	"Run for Victory"	Sachiko Kanno	Junji Nishimura, Tōru Yoshida	September 18, 2022
12	"SUNRISE"	Masahiro Hosoda, Shige Fukase	Gōichi Iwahata, Junji Nishimura	September 25, 2022

== See also ==
- Venus Project, similar concept: idols compete in a futuristic sports-like competition called Formula Venus
