= Wakana Aoi =

Japanese actress and former singer

- 葵 わかな
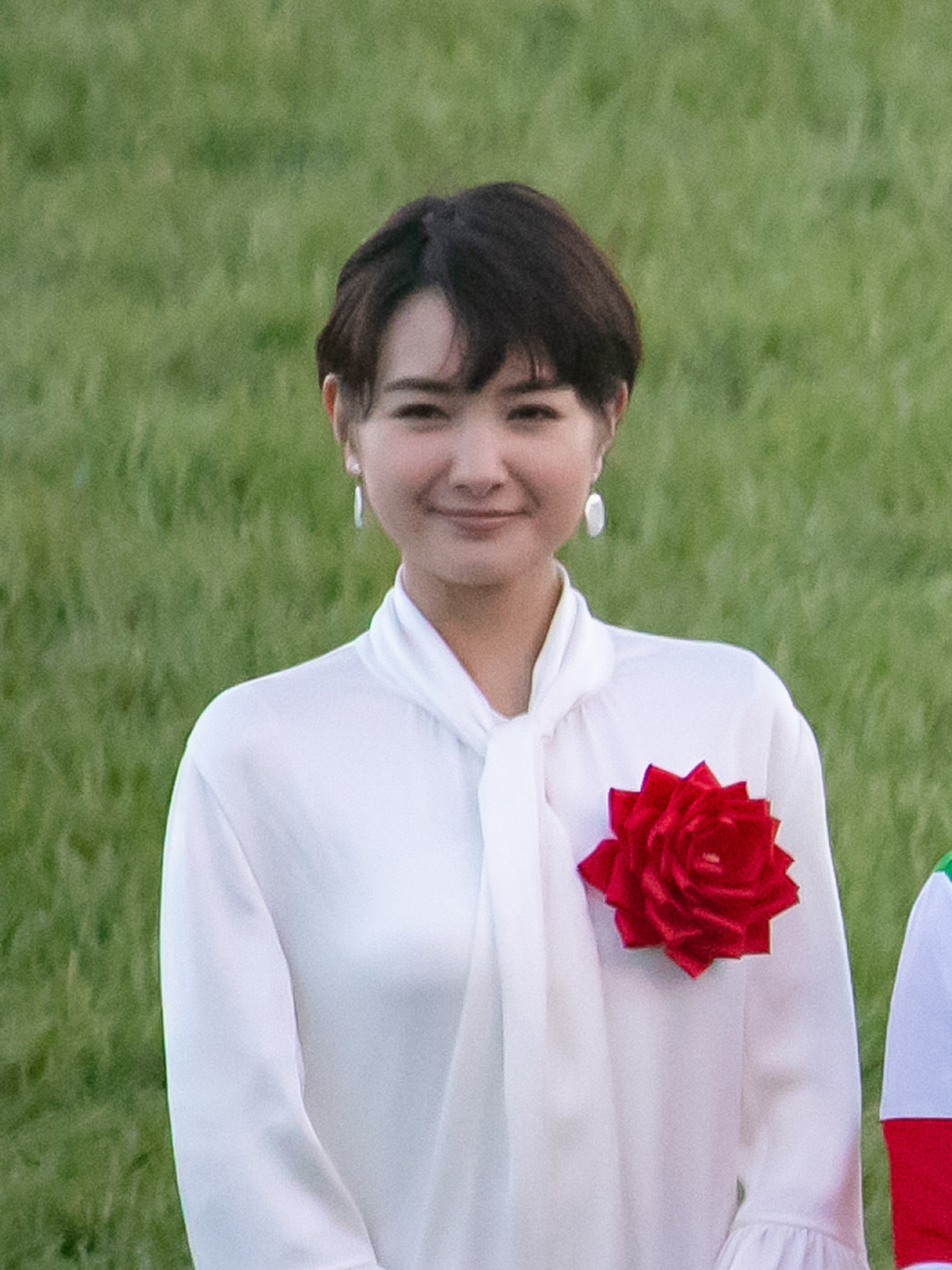
- Aoi in 2018
- Born: June 30, 1998 (age 28); Kanagawa, Japan
- Occupation: Actress
- Years active: 2009–present
- Agent: Stardust Promotion
- Website: Official website

Wakana Aoi (葵 わかな, Aoi Wakana; born June 30, 1998 in Kanagawa) is a Japanese actress and former singer. In March 2017, she landed the lead role in NHK's 97th Asadora, Laugh It Up!, which aired from October 2017 to March 2018.

== Career ==
=== 2009–2012: Early career ===
Aoi was scouted in Harajuku, Tokyo, in her fifth year of elementary school. She had been taking photos to send with her audition documents at the time. She made her television debut in 2009 through a FamilyMart commercial and made her acting debut in the TV series Samurai High School. Her next appearance came in January 2010, where she played young Mamako Ino in an episode of the TV series Angel Bank. The following month, she played Caroline Izumi in TV Asahi's 2 hour long television special Kasai Chōsakan Renjirō Kurenai. She reprised her role as Caroline Izumi in November 2010, January 2012, and November 2012, then returned to America.

=== 2013–present ===
In December 2012, Aoi was chosen to be a member of the new idol group Otome Shinto, along with Chika Arakawa, Yurika Takahashi, and Ayame Tajiri. The group made their CD debut two months later with the single "Mousou☆Koukan Nikki". Aoi left the group in July 2014 to focus on acting.

In 2013, she played small roles in Aibō Season 11 and Taberu Dake. Later that year, she played young Mao Waratai in Takahiro Miki's fantasy romance film Girl in the Sunny Place. The film received positive reviews and Aoi gained attention for her performance. The following year, she played a supporting role in the adventure film Samurai Pirates, portraying the main character's classmate. Next, she played small roles in the TV series Divine Retribution: Punisher of Darkness, Aoi Honō, Binta!, and Woman won't allow it. Aoi gained attention for her appearances in commercials for Tokio Marine Nichido and Yamazaki Biscuits.

In 2015, she played supporting roles in films Have a Song on Your Lips and Tsumi no Yohaku, and in the TV series Omotesando Koukou Gasshoubu!. In March 2016, she starred alongside Yoko Moriguchi in the TV series Joyu Ochi. The following month, she starred in the horror film Horror no Tenshi. She was named the new "CM queen" in November.

In March 2017, she landed the lead role in NHK's 97th Asadora Laugh It Up!, portraying Ten Fujioka. Laugh It Up! is set during the late Meiji era to post-World War II period. Her character was modelled after Sei Yoshimoto, the founder of entertainment conglomerate Yoshimoto Kogyo. On December 12, 2017, she hosted the year-end music program Waga Kokoro no Osaka Melody. From April to June 2018, Aoi played nurse Miwa Hanabusa in the TBS medical drama series Black Forceps, appearing alongside Kazunari Ninomiya and Ryoma Takeuchi.

Aoi made her stage debut in February 2019 at the Tokyo International Forum, as Juliet in the musical version of Romeo and Juliet, sharing the role together with Erika Ikuta and Haruka Kinoshita. She along with Haruka Kinoshita then played Anya in the musical Anastasia in 2020 and 2023. She has also played Emma Nolan in the musical The Prom.

== Personal life ==
Aoi was born in Kanagawa, Japan. In January 2017, Aoi was accepted to Keio University. She is studying policy studies.

== Filmography ==
=== Film ===
Year	Title	Role	Notes	Ref.
2013	Girl in the Sunny Place	young Mao Watarai		
2014	Samurai Pirates	Aiko Miyamoto		
2015	Have a Song on Your Lips	Chinatsu Sekiya		
2015	Assassination Classroom	Ayaka Saitō		
2015	The Edge of Sin	Nanao Sasagawa		
2016	Horror no Tenshi	Herself	Lead role	
2017	Survival Family	Yui Suzuki		
2017	Lights of Kyoto	Mikoto	Lead role	
2018	Midnight Bus	Akina Takamiya		
2018	Lost in Ramen	Kojima		
2018	Ao-Natsu	Rio	Lead role	
2019	Ninkyō Gakuen	Chihiro		
2026	2126, Looking for the Sea's Star	Akari		

=== Television drama ===
Year	Title	Role	Notes	Ref.
2009	Samurai High School	young Ai Nagasawa	Episode 1	
2010	Angel Bank	young Mamako Ino	Episode 1	
2014	Woman won't allow it.	Mayu Misawa	Episode 7	
2014	Aoi Honō	Hiroyuki's sister	Episode 6	
2015	Kageri Yuku Natsu	Mio		
2015	High School Chorus	Kyoko Hasumi		
2015	Itsumo Majika ni	Ayaka Hayase	Television film	
2016	Money no Tenshi	Madoka Sugawara		
2016	Joyu Ochi	Rui Kiyoshima	Lead role	
2016	Mae! Kagura Hime	Sakiko Kodama	Lead role	
2017	Kin no Tono	Suzu Hoshino		
2017	Survival Boy and Girl	Yui Suzuki		
2017	Konya mo LL Episode 2	Hikari	Lead role	
2017	& Bishōjo: Next Girl meets Tokyo	Misako	Episode 3	
2017–18	Laugh It Up!	Ten Fujioka	Lead role; Asadora	
2018–24	Black Forceps	Miwa Hanabusa	2 seasons	
2021	Influence	Maho	Miniseries	
2025	Changes of Heart	Koyori Hoshi	Lead role	

=== Other television ===
Year	Title	Notes	Ref.
2012	Yōkoso! Higashi Ikebukuro Himawari Sō	12 episodes	
2014	100% Takarazuka	Episode 6	
2015	Tsūkai TV Sukatto Japan	6 episodes	
2017	17th Waga Kokoro no Osaka Melody	Main host	
2017	68th NHK Kōhaku Uta Gassen	Guest	

=== Dubbing ===
- Cats, Victoria the White Cat (Francesca Hayward)

== Awards and nominations ==
Year	Award	Category	Work	Result	Ref.
2019	43rd Elan d'or Awards	Newcomer of the Year	Herself	Won	
