= Shikimori's Not Just a Cutie =

Japanese manga series and its adaptation(s)

- First tankōbon volume cover, featuring Miyako Shikomori

可愛いだけじゃない式守さん (Kawaii dake ja Nai Shikimori-san)
- Genre: Romantic comedy
- Manga
- Written by: Keigo Maki
- Published by: Kodansha
- English publisher: NA: Kodansha USA
- Imprint: Shōnen Magazine Comics
- Magazine: Magazine Pocket
- Original run: February 2, 2019 – February 18, 2023
- Volumes: 20
- Anime television series
- Directed by: Ryota Itoh
- Written by: Yoshimi Narita
- Music by: Hiroaki Tsutsumi
- Studio: Doga Kobo
- Licensed by: Crunchyroll; EA/SEA: Muse Communication
- Original network: ANN (ABC TV, TV Asahi)
- Original run: April 10, 2022 – July 10, 2022
- Episodes: 12
- icon

Shikimori's Not Just a Cutie (Japanese: 可愛いだけじゃない式守さん, Hepburn: Kawaii dake ja Nai Shikimori-san) (Note: The Japanese manga has an English subtitle "Miss Shikimori Is Not Just Cute") is a Japanese romantic comedy manga series by Keigo Maki. The story follows the day-to-day life of teenage couple Yuuki Izumi and Miyako Shikimori. Izumi's life seems to be remarkably accident-prone whenever he is not with his girlfriend; this revelation leads the couple to gradually deepen their relationship in hopes of eventually ridding Izumi of his unusual life problem.

The manga was serialized on Kodansha's Magazine Pocket website and app from February 2019 to February 2023, with its chapters collected in 20 tankōbon volumes as of April 2023. It is licensed in North America by Kodansha USA. An anime television series adaptation produced by Doga Kobo aired from April to July 2022.

== Plot ==
A high school student, Yuuki Izumi, often seems to face accidents and misfortune in life. However, those problems seem to stop happening whenever he spends time with his girlfriend, Miyako Shikimori. Yuuki sees Shikimori, a much more popular and self-confident student than himself, as more than just a significant other – he finds her compassionate and protective nature as a key to solving his accident-prone life. The two gradually deepen their love for one another in hopes of making sure Yuuki overcomes his unusual life ordeal.

== Characters ==
Yuuki Izumi (和泉 幽希, Izumi Yūki) (Note: In the manga profiles and anime credits, Izumi is referred to as Izumi-kun (和泉くん);^{Vol. 2 profiles} his full given name is not revealed until near the end of the manga series.^{Ch. 176})
Voiced by: Shūichirō Umeda (Japanese); Bryson Baugus (English)
Izumi is Shikimori's boyfriend, described as "an upbeat and friendly kid. He's had terrible luck his entire life."^{Vol. 4 profiles} He is a good student, having placed 5th in his class,^{Ch. 11} and unlike Shikimori and Inuzuka, is a good cook.^{Ch. 29}
Miyako Shikimori (式守 都, Shikimori Miyako) (Note: In the manga profiles and anime credits, Shikimori is referred to as Shikimori-san (式守さん);^{Vol. 2 profiles} her full given name is not revealed until near the end of the manga series.^{Ch. 175})
Voiced by: Saori Ōnishi (Japanese); Macy Anne Johnson (English)
Shikimori is a beautiful and outgoing high school girl and Izumi's girlfriend. When Izumi gets in trouble, her persona changes to a cool heartthrob with sharp glaring eyes which everyone around her admires. She has excellent reflexes and regularly rescues Izumi from dangerous situations. Her friends call her Mi-chon (みっちょん, Mitchon; anime: Micchon)^{Ch. 27} and Izumi's parents call her Mi-chan (みーちゃん, Mī-chan).^{Ch. 17} She has light pink hair, and is a good student, having placed 11th in her class.^{Ch. 11} She is athletic and excels especially when Izumi cheers her on.^{Ch. 5, 18, 19-20} She is sensitive at times, especially when Izumi admires other girls and women shown in the media. She has a few weaknesses such as cooking and singing, although in a later chapter, it is revealed she has been taking cooking lessons along with Izumi's mother and has gotten better.^{Ch. 15, 73, 82}
It is later revealed that Shikimori was really shy and timid before Izumi asked her out, and gained confidence once she was able to motivate Izumi to be a little more assertive.^{Ch. 38, 41}
Shu Inuzuka (犬束 秀, Inuzuka Shū)
Voiced by: Nobuhiko Okamoto (Japanese); Clifford Chapin (English)
Izumi's best friend, described as "true to himself", "likes to goof around, but he doesn't like slacking off."^{Vol. 4 profiles} Shikimori's friends call him "Inu" (Dog).^{Ch. 36} He has a part-time job.
Kyo Nekozaki (猫崎 享, Nekozaki Kyō)
Voiced by: Misato Matsuoka (Japanese); Michelle Rojas (English)
She is one of Shikimori's best friends along with Hachimitsu. She's described as "sporty", "really outgoing, but she can get a little sappy".^{Vol. 4 profiles} She is on the volleyball team with Kamiya.^{Ch. 40}
Yui Hachimitsu (八満 結, Hachimitsu Yui)
Voiced by: Rina Hidaka (Japanese); Molly Zhang (English)
She is one of Shikimori's best friends along with Nekozaki. She's described as having a lifeless expression, but is observant.^{Vol. 4 profiles} She is petite compared to her friends, and prefers indoor activities like Izumi.^{Ch. 24, 26} She is fond of eating sweets.^{Ch. 120}
Ai Kamiya (狼谷 藍, Kamiya Ai) (Note: In the manga profiles and anime credits, Kamiya is listed as Kamiya-san (狼谷さん)^{Vol. 5 profiles} her given name is not revealed until later in the manga series.^{Ch. 152})
Voiced by: Ayaka Fukuhara (Japanese); Morgan Lauré (English)
A star player on the volleyball team. She is tall and slim, and very popular at school.^{Vol. 5 profiles} She and Izumi work on the library committee together. She likes Izumi, but when she learns of Izumi and Shikimori's relationship, she feels pained and saddened she did not get to have a relationship with Izumi. Shikimori helps her reconcile her feelings.^{Ch. 39-43}

=== Supporting characters ===
Motoko Izumi (和泉 許子, Izumi Motoko)
Voiced by: Emi Shinohara (Japanese); Lydia Mackay (English)
Izumi's mother. She is as accident prone as Izumi.^{Ch. 17}
Akisada Izumi (和泉 明貞, Izumi Akisada)
Voiced by: Naomi Kusumi (Japanese); Mark Stoddard (English)
Izumi's father and Motoko's husband. He is fairly strong as he is able to carry Izumi and Shikimori on his back.^{Ch. 35}
Miyabi Shikimori (式守 雅, Shikimori Miyabi)
Voiced by: Romi Park (Japanese); Colleen Clinkenbeard (English)
Shikimori's mother. Like her daughter, she gives off a serious look.^{Ch. 66-67}
Fuji Shikimori (式守 藤, Shikimori Fuji)
Voiced by: Hiro Shimono (Japanese); Ricco Fajardo (English)
Shikimori's older brother.
Rika Isana (鯨 里歌, Isana Rika)
Isana is a young woman who works at the coffee shop which Inuzuka is also working part-time at. She hopes to someday own her own shop, and admires Inuzuka for his determination.^{Ch. 79}
Saruogi (猿荻)
Saruogi is a classmate who joins Izumi and Shikimori's group as part of the school trip to Kyoto. He is painfully shy and slow to answer. Nekozaki cites a story where he gives up his seat on the train for an old woman but inadvertently gets off a stop too early and ends up being late. After Izumi talks with him, Saruogi plans on being a little more assertive.^{Ch. 84-85}

== Media ==
=== Manga ===
Written and illustrated by Keigo Maki, Shikimori's Not Just a Cutie was serialized in Kodansha's Magazine Pocket website and app from February 2, 2019, to February 18, 2023. 20 tankōbon volumes have been published as of April 2023. In March 2020, Kodansha USA announced that they had licensed the series for print release in North America. The first English volume was released on October 27, 2020.

==== Volumes ====
No.	Original release date	Original ISBN	English release date	English ISBN
1	June 7, 2019	978-4-06-516223-1	October 27, 2020	978-1-64-651175-4
Chapters 1–16, 13.5 and a bonus story. This volume covers chapters published in Pocket Magazine from the 2019-02-02 issue to the 2019-5-11 issue, and Weekly Shonen Magazine 2019 issue 16
Izumi remarks how Shikimori is very cute but sometimes she's not, causing her to pout about it until she saves him from getting hit from a speeding car. At school, Shikimori saved Izumi from getting hit on the head with an eraser; when she leaves for the restroom, Izumi's classmates poke fun of how ordinary he is, but when Shikimori returns she gives them a scary glare not to mess with them. With the wind blowing, they talk about what happened, but then Shikimori saves Izumi from a falling sign. Izumi hopes to impress Shikimori on a movie date but the film is a horror movie and he finds himself being comforted by her. Izumi mentions to Shikimori how cool she looks playing basketball, which inspires Shikimori to take her game seriously. Izumi thinks back to the day they met when she retrieved his high school entrance exam ticket. Izumi gives on a Christmas date but forgets his gloves. They go together to the new year's shrine visit. They go skiing. Their class has a bean throwing event, but when Shikimori slips, Izumi ends up bumping his chin on her head. Izumi can't focus on his studying because Shikimori is wearing glasses. When Izumi mentions he likes some fashion idol on a billboard, Shikimori changes her look. Shikimori looks after Izumi while he rests in the nurse's office. Izumi tries to take a cool picture of Shikimori during the flower viewing event. Izumi tries Shikimori's bento but realizes she can't cook. Izumi's parents have Shikimori over for Izumi's birthday.
2	September 9, 2019	978-4-06-516891-2	December 22, 2020	978-1-64-651181-5
Chapters 17–26 and two bonus stories. This volume covers chapters published in Pocket Magazine from the 2019-05-25 issue to the 2019-08-03 issue
While Izumi takes a nap, Shikimori gets along with his mom and dad. Izumi, Shikimori, and their friends go bowling together. For sports day, Izumi cheers for Shikimori, causing her to perform really well. Izumi feels more lonely and accident prone. They do art class together. While picking up a stray cat; Izumi tries to protect Shikimori from getting splashed on by a car, but fails. They go to Izumi's house to clean up, but as his parents are out, Shikimori goes for a kiss but Izumi's parents return. Shikimori and her friends have a sleepover. Izumi and Shikimori visit a planetarium where the seating is like a bed. The gang discuss whether to go to the beach or the river for summer break.
3	December 9, 2019	978-4-06-518339-7	March 30, 2021	978-1-64-651193-8
Chapters 27–37 and a bonus story. This volume covers chapters published in Pocket Magazine from the 2019-06-29 issue to the 2019-09-21 issue
After seeing Izumi admire a swimsuit model poster, Shikimori and her friends shop for a swimsuit. Shikimori calls Izumi late at night. On the summer trip, Izumi impresses the gang with his cooking ability. Izumi tries to rescue a little girl alone on the river, but when his foot cramps up, Shikimori has to rescue them both. The gang takes the train home. At a cafe, the waitress puts the cute dessert set in front of Izumi instead of Shikimori. At the local summer festival, Shikimori impresses a game booth operator. Izumi carries Shikimori up the stairs to see the fireworks from a secret spot, and gets help from his dad (who happened to be there with his mom) to carry both of them down. The gang play video games at Hachimitsu's place. Izumi meets Shikimori's German Shepherd.
4	March 9, 2020	978-4-06-518777-7	June 8, 2021	978-1-64-651194-5
Chapters 38–45, 45.5 and a bonus story. This volume covers chapters published in Pocket Magazine from the 2019-06-29 issue to the 2019-09-21 issue
Izumi is sent on an errand to get drinks for their class group, so Shikimori joins him. Their class hosts an animal cafe. Izumi meets schoolmate Kamiya for library duty but Kamiya asks him a barrage of questions about how he got into a relationship with Shikimori. Last year, Izumi and a really shy Shikimori were paired together for the school's couples event. But when Izumi loses his matching paper and they are unable to find it, Shikimori inspires Izumi to plead to the committee to take their picture together. Their plea is successful, after which Izumi confesses to Shikimori, and they become a couple. For the current year, Kamiya and Izumi have the same number, so Shikimori asks to swap numbers with her. Kamiya agrees but then starts feeling sad that she is missing a romance opportunity with the kind and friendly Izumi. Sensing that Kamiya has feelings for Izumi, Shikimori tears up the number and says that it's okay to harbor those feelings and that Kamiya is a good person. Kamiya becomes friends with Shikimori. Izumi gives Shikimori a necklace for her birthday which coincides with their one-year dating anniversary. They go on a date at the aquarium. In the bonus manga, Izumi's mother gives Izumi a haircut but accidentally gives him bangs. Shikimori decides to get her hair trimmed with bangs as well.
5	June 9, 2020	978-4-06-519740-0	July 6, 2021	978-1-64-651211-9
Chapters 46–55 and a bonus story. This volume covers chapters published in Pocket Magazine from the 2019-09-28 issue to the 2019-11-30 issue
When Izumi is at home sick and requests Inuzuka for his class notes, Inuzuka wonders if Shikimori views him as a rival for Izumi's affections. Hachimitsu, who has been tailing and observing them, reveals that Shikimori has been treating Inuzuka like her older brother. Kamiya joins Nekozaki and Shikimori at the amusement arcade. Later, Kamiya and Shikimori are challenged by two gyaru girls for using the basketball court. Kamiya thanks Nekozaki for maintaining their friendship. Izumi returns to school, and Shikimori gives him a hug privately. After Izumi and Hachimitsu are chosen to participate in the class relay race at the school's sports day, Shikimori, Nekozaki and Inuzuka join in. They practice hard, especially Hachimitsu and Izumi who aren't as athletic as the others. During the event, Nekozaki goes first, then Hachimitsu, then Izumi, and then Shikimori.
6	October 9, 2020	978-4-06-521020-8	September 28, 2021; November 2, 2021 (digital)	978-1-64-651212-6
Chapters 56–65 and a bonus story. This volume covers chapters published in Pocket Magazine from the 2020-02-29 issue to the 2020-05-12 issue
Shikimori is able to gain ground for the relay team, and passes the baton to Inuzuka for the team win. Afterwards, Izumi catches another cold, so Shikimori visits and becomes more self-conscious. The class seats are rearranged so that Shikimori sits behind Izumi; they exchange notes and then Shikimori pokes his back. Izumi and Shikimori go to the amusement park. Shikimori ponders whether they will kiss by the moonlight like in the commercial. The next day, Shikimori's friends ask her about it, but find that he only kissed her on the cheek. Izumi's parents invite Shikimori go with them and Izumi to the hot springs and sauna. Izumi and Shikimori buy ice cream at a popular store. As the gang prepare for final exams, they consider studying at Shikimori's house, which makes Shikimori really nervous since has not told her parents yet that she is dating Izumi.
7	January 8, 2021	978-4-06-522032-0	December 7, 2021	978-1-64-651289-8
Chapters 66–74 and a bonus story. This volume covers chapters published in Pocket Magazine from the 2020-05-16 issue to the 2020-07-18 issue
The gang meet Shikimori's mother who is even more serious and intense than Shikimori, but she observes that Shikimori has been a lot happier when she is with him. Izumi tells Shikimori's mother they have been dating for over a year, and Shikimori's mother accepts it. When Shikimori and Izumi put a wager on who will do better on the finals, Shikimori appears a bit spaced out and exhausted on the exam day. When Izumi wants to talk about it the next day, she gets self-conscious and runs off, but Izumi catches up to her. The gang talk about career paths and also what fun activities they can do in their senior year. Shikimori joins Izumi to shop for a jacket. Kamiya joins the girls for presents shopping, and then have an all-girls Christmas Eve karaoke party. Izumi and Shikimori see a Christmas lights event and later exchange presents.
8	April 9, 2021	978-4-06-522880-7	January 11, 2022	978-1-64-651290-4
Chapters 75–83 and a bonus story. This volume covers chapters published in Pocket Magazine from the 2020-07-25 issue to the 2020-09-26 issue
Izumi invites Shikimori to his house to watch a movie at home along with his mother. Izumi and Shikimori go to the New Years shrine visit. While Izumi and his mother are shopping they meet Shikimori and her mother. The gang make kites to fly. Izumi's kite gets lost but a woman named Isana, who is Inuzuka's senior at his part-time job finds it. They visit the shop and learn about Inuzuka's and Isana's career aspirations. Izumi forgets his textbook and shares with Shikimori. They visit the zoo where Shikimori reveals she is a bit afraid of tigers. At home economics class, Shikimori has improved in her cooking. The gang prepare for their school trip to Kyoto, but need an extra boy in their group, so Izumi picks Saruogi, a boy who seems to be painfully shy and keeps to himself.
9	July 9, 2021	978-4-06-524019-9	April 5, 2022	978-1-64-651435-9
Chapters 84–92 and a bonus story. This volume covers chapters published in Pocket Magazine from the 2020-10-17 issue to the 2020-12-12 issue
10	October 8, 2021	978-4-06-525745-6	August 23, 2022; August 2, 2022 (digital)	978-1-64-651590-5
Chapters 93–99 and a bonus story. This volume covers chapters published in Pocket Magazine from the 2020-12-26 issue to the 2021-02-13 issue
11	January 7, 2022	978-4-06-526594-9	December 20, 2022; December 6, 2022 (digital)	978-1-64-651591-2
Chapters 100–107 and two bonus stories. This volume covers chapters published in Pocket Magazine from the 2020-02-20 issue to the 2021-04-24 issue
12	March 9, 2022	978-4-06-527271-8	April 11, 2023	978-1-64-651678-0
Chapters 108–115 and a bonus story. This volume covers chapters published in Pocket Magazine from the 2021-05-08 issue to the 2021-06-26 issue.
13	May 9, 2022	978-4-06-527850-5	July 11, 2023	978-1-64-651679-7
Chapters 116–123 and a bonus story. This volume covers chapters published in Pocket Magazine from the 2021-07-03 issue to the 2021-08-28 issue
14	July 8, 2022	978-4-06-528383-7	October 10, 2023	978-1-64-651823-4
Chapters 124–130 and a bonus story. This volume covers chapters published in Pocket Magazine from the 2021-09-04 issue to the 2022-10-30 issue
15	October 7, 2022	978-4-06-528383-7	January 9, 2024	978-1-64-651950-7
Chapters 131–138 and a bonus story. This volume covers chapters published in Pocket Magazine from the 2021-11-06 issue to the 2022-01-22 issue
16	December 9, 2022	978-4-06-529948-7	April 9, 2024	978-1-64-651951-4
Chapters 139–147 and a bonus story. This volume covers chapters published in Pocket Magazine from the 2022-02-12 issue to the 2022-03-19 issue
17	February 9, 2023	978-4-06-530330-6	July 9, 2024	979-8-88-877003-0
Chapters 148–156 and a bonus story.
18	February 9, 2023	978-4-06-530742-7	October 8, 2024	979-8-88-877004-7
Chapters 157–166 and a bonus story.
19	April 7, 2023	978-4-06-531347-3	January 7, 2025	979-8-88-877065-8
Chapters 167–174 and a bonus story.
20	April 7, 2023	978-4-06-531348-0	April 8, 2025	979-8-89-478531-8
Chapters 175–178 and 3 bonus stories.

=== Anime ===
In January 2021, the official Twitter account for the Magazine Pocket service announced that the series would receive an anime television series adaptation by Doga Kobo. Ryota Itoh directed the series, with Shōhei Yamanaka serving as assistant director, Yoshimi Narita overseeing the series' scripts, Ai Kikuchi designing the characters, and Hiroaki Tsutsumi composing the music. It aired from April 10 to July 10, 2022, on ABC and TV Asahi's Animazing!!! programming block. (Note: ABC lists the series premiere at 26:00 on April 9, 2022, which is effectively 2:00 a.m. JST on April 10.) The opening theme song is "Honey Jet Coaster" (ハニージェットコースター) by Nasuo☆, while the ending theme song is "Route BLUE" by Yuki Nakashima. Crunchyroll streamed the series outside of Asia. Muse Communication licensed the series in South and Southeast Asia.

On April 11, 2022, Crunchyroll announced that the series would receive an English dub, which premiered on April 23.

==== Episodes ====
No.	Title	Directed by	Written by	Storyboarded by	Original release date
1	"My Girlfriend Is Super Cute"; Transliteration: "Boku no Kanojo wa Totemo Kawaii" (Japanese: 僕の彼女はとてもかわいい)	Ryōta Itō	Yoshimi Narita	Ryōta Itō	April 10, 2022
Izumi is a kind and upbeat high school student, who happens to suffer from unluckiness. While waking to school, he trips on the pavement within seconds of leaving the house, and falls over a rope to avoid a bird dropping. He meets up with his girlfriend, Shikimori, who saves him from being hit by a speeding truck. They meet with their friends, Shu Inuzuka, Kyo Nekozaki, and Yui Hachimitsu, and confirm they will be in the same class this year. When Shikimori overhears some of their other classmates telling Izumi that he is too dull to be in a relationship with such a cute girl, she retrieves Izumi, returning a cold glare back at them. Shikimori goes to a bowling alley with Izumi and their friends, where Nekozaki and Hachimitsu tell her to pretend to be bad at it so as to appear cuter. However, when Izumi encourages her before her turn, she ends up bowling a perfect game. As they walk home, Izumi tells Shikimori that he feels pathetic for having her defend him all the time, with him being unable to make it up to her. Just then, a large sign falls towards Izumi, but Shikimori deflects it. She tells Izumi not to worry, and that all that he needs to do is stay by her side.
2	"Wind and Clouds, Ball Sports Tournament!"; Transliteration: "Fūun, Kyūgi Taikai!" (Japanese: 風雲、球技大会！)	Shōhei Yamanaka, Sung Min Kim	Misuzu Chiba	Shōhei Yamanaka	April 17, 2022
Shikimori and Izumi's class holds their sports competitions. During Izumi's soccer match, he gets hit in the head by the ball, and is cared for by Shikimori in the nurse's office. During Shikimori's volleyball match, they start losing the game, but a healed Izumi arrives and encourages Shikimori from the stands. She proceeds to play exceptionally and, alongside Nekozaki, rally their team to victory. As Izumi congratulates Shikimori on the court, Kamiya, the other team's ace, leaves disappointed. Shikimori immediately becomes a celebrity, with many girls lining up to take pictures with her and showering her with praises. Seeing this, Izumi decides to stand aside. While Shikimori tries to get past her admirers to get to Izumi, Inuzuka saves him from a stray volleyball that comes through the window, hitting him in the face. Izumi comes close to his face to apologize for his bad luck, enraging Shikimori. Later, Izumi nearly falls down the stairs, but Shikimori saves him in time. Angry, she berates him for wanting to walk home without her. Izumi tells her he was going to the school entrance to wait for her, and that he misses being with her. Delighted, Shikimori agrees to walk home with him.
3	"Misfortune, Followed by Sunshine"; Transliteration: "Fukō Nochi, Hare" (Japanese: 不幸のち、晴れ)	Kenta Ōnishi	Yoshimi Narita	Kenta Ōnishi	April 24, 2022
Inuzuka gifts two coupons for the movies to Izumi, which he uses to invite a delighted Shikimori. Izumi packs a bag with all the necessary items to counter his usual bad luck, recalling his previous dates with Shikimori ruined by his misfortune. Meanwhile, Shikimori has a hard time deciding what to wear. The next day, Izumi meets with her, and is stunned by her look. They arrive at the cinema, where she chooses a horror movie. Izumi believes he will finally demonstrate his manliness to her, but the complete opposite happens, with Shikimori having to comfort a terrified Izumi. After the movie, they go to a bakery, but Izumi has lost his wallet despite his preventive measures. Bummed out, they come across his parents, who invite Shikimori over for dinner. After they eat, Motoko, his mother, thanks Shikimori for her patience, explaining to her how Izumi's caring and friendly nature comes from his constant injuries as a child never affecting his spirit. Shikimori promises to continue protecting him, delighting Motoko. As Izumi wakes up from a nap, he finds Shikimori playing videogames with his father, Akisada. As he walks her home, Shikimori tells Izumi that they shall watch a movie he likes the next time.
4	"How They Each Feel at the Start of Summer"; Transliteration: "Rikka, Sorezore no Omoi" (Japanese: 立夏、それぞれの想い)	Ryōki Kamitsubo	Yuka Yamada	Ryōki Kamitsubo	May 1, 2022
Izumi and his friends hang out on the school rooftop. As summer has just started, they discuss on where they want to go on their vacation. Nekozaki and Inuzuka propose the beach, but decide against it when they remember Izumi's sensitivity towards the sun. They ultimately propose the river, so they can all enjoy it. Inuzuka and Izumi want to study for their exams, but Nekozaki takes them all to the mall to buy supplies for their vacation. Shikimori notices Izumi glaring at an ad of a woman wearing a swimsuit, so she sets off embarrassed. Nekozaki finds her in the swimsuit store, as she remembers when she became friends with her, after she defeated her in a basketball match. Shikimori buys the swimsuit, but hides it from Izumi when he asks her about it. Back home, Izumi receives a call from Shikimori. They look at the stars, as Izumi explains the bad luck he has when he tries to stargaze with his father. Shikimori promises to see the stars properly with him, and insists on going places he wants to go together. Happy, Izumi thanks her, and after hanging up, Shikimori ponders on how much she wanted to see Izumi at that moment. Sometime later, Shikimori attends cooking classes with Motoko.
5	"Jolly Times at the River!"; Transliteration: "Ukiuki Kawa Asobi!" (Japanese: ウキウキ川あそび！)	Takashi Takeuchi	Misuzu Chiba	Hiroaki Yoshikawa	May 8, 2022
Izumi and his friends arrive at the river town, were they decide to hold a BBQ. Izumi offers himself to cook after seeing Inuzuka's poor knife skills. He proves to be a skilled cook, which prompts Shikimori to attempt to cook herself. However, Izumi is blown away by how bad her food is, but seeing how much effort she put into it, Izumi forces himself to eat it all, prompting Shikimori to promise to become better at cooking. After eating some s'mores, they head down to the river. Izumi sees a little girl being carried away by the current, but after saving her, his foot cramps, so Shikimori rescues him. Back on land, the girl thanks Izumi with a kiss on the cheek. They head down to swim, where Izumi finally tells Shikimori that she looks cute in her new swimsuit. They return to the town to have some ice cream, where Izumi gives Shikimori an indirect kiss after eating from her cone. Before she can do the same, however, Inuzuka appears and eats Izumi's cone, enraging her. As they all fall asleep on the train back home, Izumi reflects on how lucky he is to have found his group of friends. Shikimori wakes up, and seeing Izumi asleep on Inuzuka's shoulder, moves his head onto herself.
6	"With Fireworks Comes Summer's End"; Transliteration: "Natsu zo Hedataru Hanabi ka na" (Japanese: 夏ぞ隔たる花火かな)	Geisei Morita	Yuka Yamada	Ryōta Itō, Shōhei Yamanaka	May 15, 2022
Izumi sees the news about the upcoming fireworks festival, and invites Shikimori to go with him. While Motoko gives Izumi a yukata to wear, Shikimori has her brother help her tie her own. They meet up at the festival's entrance, and visit several of the stalls, before having cotton candy. Izumi wishes to buy Shikimori one, still feeling down for being unable to do things in return for her. She explains that seeing him happy is enough for her. They then go to a shooting game, where Shikimori wins a wolf plushie effortlessly, impressing both Izumi and the operator. They find their friends, and play in a goldfish scooping game, were Nekozaki has to prevent Shikimori from becoming too competitive with Inuzuka. Izumi reveals that his father told him about a special place to watch the fireworks. However, due to her bruised feet, Izumi offers to carry her. Arriving at the top of a slope, Izumi confesses that he wanted to invite Shikimori the previous year as well, but was too cowardly to do so. She reveals she was waiting for him back then, but is happy to see them with him now. As they are about to leave, Izumi trips, but is saved by Akisada, who reveals he attended the spot with Motoko.
SP–1	"Recap Special"; Transliteration: "Issho ni Miyou! TV Anime "Kawaii dake ja Nai Shikimori-san" dai 1-wa Ōdio Komentarī SP" (Japanese: いっしょに見よう！TVアニメ『可愛いだけじゃない式守さん』第1話オーディオコメンタリーSP)	N/A	N/A	N/A	May 22, 2022
A recap special of the first 6 episodes.
7	"Cultural Festival I"; Transliteration: "Bunkasai Ichi" (Japanese: 文化祭I)	Sei Min Kim	Misuzu Chiba	Hiroaki Yoshikawa	May 29, 2022 (Note: 2 weeks see delays because of Doga Kobo's COVID-19 closure.)
The school prepares for their cultural festival. Izumi commends how cute Shikimori looks in her costume for their animal café. During the first day, Izumi is overwhelmed with his work, and nearly trips. However, Shikimori catches him on time. The next day, Izumi attends library duty, discovering that the only other person present is Kamiya. As such, he recalls when he met her, when they were paired together for library duty the previous year. Back in the present, Kamiya aggressively asks Izumi about how he began dating Shikimori. Meanwhile, Shikimori gets jealous when she sees that she did not get the same number as Izumi in the Couple Numbers Game, which has students with the same number take pictures together before they start dating. Sensing that Kamiya might like Shikimori, Izumi tells her their story. During last years' cultural festival, Izumi and Shikimori got the same number. However, Izumi lost the slip, and was initially negated the picture. However, after he insisted on how much he wanted it, the president made an exception for them. Afterwards, Izumi asked Shikimori out, and they began dating. Back in the present, it is revealed that it was Kamiya who got the same number as Izumi.
8	"Cultural Festival II"; Transliteration: "Bunkasai Ni" (Japanese: 文化祭II)	Kenta Ōnishi, Takafumi Kuwano	Misuzu Chiba	Kenta Ōnishi, Ryōta Itō	June 5, 2022
Kamiya visualizes herself as a princess unable to access her forbidden love, Izumi, in a dance. In reality, Nekozaki calls Kamiya outside, where she meets with Shikimori, who asks Kamiya to switch numbers with her, having found that she has Izumi's number. Kamiya agrees, and hands her the slip. However, Shikimori notices Kamiya's comfort around Izumi. After finishing her duties, Kamiya reflects on the rooftop, wanting to bury her feelings. However, Shikimori arrives, and tries to give her the slip back, as she explains she realized she does not want to be unfair to her feelings. However, Kamiya refuses, and promises to not come close to Izumi again. Shikimori rips up the paper and embraces a crying Kamiya, telling her to cherish her feelings, and thanking her for being so kind. After Shikimori leaves, Kamiya wishes them happiness. Izumi takes Shikimori to a park to give her a heart locket as a gift for her birthday. Delighted, Shikimori tells Izumi to never change the way he is. Izumi tells her that she changed him for the better, and promises to keep getting stronger so that she can be relaxed when they are together. Shikimori breaks into tears and embraces him, promising to never leave his side.
SP–2	"Best of Special"; Transliteration: "Min'na de Erabou! TV Anime "Kawaii dake ja Nai Shikimori-san" Mei Shīn Furikaeri SP" (Japanese: みんなで選ぼう！TVアニメ『可愛いだけじゃない式守さん』名シーン振り返りSP)	N/A	N/A	N/A	June 12, 2022
A special compiling the best of scenes from previous episodes.
9	"Innocence and Clumsiness"; Transliteration: "Mujaki-sa to Bukiyō-sa" (Japanese: 無邪気さと不器用さ)	Ryōki Kamitsubo	Yuka Yamada	Hiroaki Yoshikawa	June 19, 2022 (Note: This episode aired at 3:30 a.m. JST, 1 hour and 30 minutes after the original air time on ABC.)
After he gets sick, Izumi texts Inuzuka asking him for his notes, making Shikimori jealous. She then asks Inuzuka if she may follow him. However, Nekozaki sends Hachimitsu to look over them. In a grocery store, Shikimori asks Inuzuka to select medicine for Izumi, and asks him to pick between two types of candy. Hachimitsu appears and tells them that after watching them, she has realized that Shikimori sees Inuzuka as an older brother, due to her coldness with her own brother. Shikimori becomes embarrassed, confirming her theory. Sometime later, Shikimori and Nekozaki find Kamiya at the mall. Nekozaki initially doubts Kamiya will hang out with them, but she accepts, and Nekozaki is impressed with how playful and friendly Kamiya is with Shikimori. They then compete to use a basketball court against two other girls. After they manage to win, they all take a group picture. After Shikimori leaves, Nekozaki tells Kamiya that she always seemed in pain, and asks her who made her smile in the way she did today. Kamiya does not answer, but tells Nekozaki that she wishes to tell her someday. As they leave, Nekozaki wishes for Kamiya to keep smiling and discovering new feelings.
10	"The Desire to Win"; Transliteration: "Kachitai Kimochi" (Japanese: 勝ちたい気持ち)	Hiroshi Haraguchi, Geisei Morita, Takashi Takeuchi	Misuzu Chiba	Hiroshi Haraguchi	June 26, 2022
Despite not wanting to race, both Izumi and Hachimitsu end up being selected for their class relay team for their upcoming sports festival. To make up for it, their friends complete the team, and begin training after school. However, both Izumi and Hachimitsu struggle to improve, but continue practicing after their friends have left. During the sports festival, Hachimitsu impresses her friends with her bag tossing capabilities, managing to finish in second place. After the main race starts, Nekozaki's speed easily puts her in front. Hachimitsu then tries to give it her all, but trips and falls. Having never cared for victory, Hachimitsu forces herself to stand up and continue, after thinking of the smile of her friends if they pulled off the improbable. She hands off the baton to Izumi, who loses one of his shoes. However, he kicks his other shoe off and continues. After handing it off to Shikimori, she manages to recover lost ground, and as the anchor, Inuzuka manages to pull off the comeback, as their class emerge as winners of the festival. Delighted, Hachimitsu thanks her team and declares she had fun, thinking of how proud she is of them.
11	"Not Just a Cutie"; Transliteration: "Kawaii dake ja Nai" (Japanese: 可愛いだけじゃない)	Ryōta Itō	Ryōta Itō	Ryōta Itō	July 3, 2022
A young Izumi is invited by his friends to be part of their group in their upcoming trip. However, he refused to go after his bad luck nearly got them hurt. In the present, Shikimori is shopping for clothes for a date with Izumi with her brother Fuji. A flashback shows a younger Shikimori, who was a karate prospect alongside him. One day, after Fuji told her he would be leaving karate, he told her to be herself, and abstain from trying to be like him or their mother. As such, after reading a romance manga, she agreed to quit karate, become a cute girl, and fall in love. On her high school entrance exam day, she saw Izumi for the first time. She retrieved his exam ticket from a tree, but believed she had made a bad first impression on him. However, on their first day of high school, she met with Izumi again, who was glad she was okay and expressed his joy to see her. As such, she fell in love with him. Back in the present, Shikimori sees a cute lipstick, but refuses to buy it when she sees its price. Having decided for clothes to wear, Fuji surprises Shikimori with the lipstick she wanted, so she leaves for her date, while Fuji looks her on proudly.
12	"Better Than a Dream"; Transliteration: "Yume yori mo" (Japanese: 夢よりも)	Ryōki Kamitsubo, Chao Nekotomi	Yoshimi Narita	Hiroaki Yoshikawa, Chao Nekotomi	July 10, 2022
At their date in an amusement park, they enter a Sleeping Beauty themed ride together. Izumi asks her if she has any dreams, so she reveals her dream of falling in love has been fulfilled. Near the end, Izumi falls asleep, so Shikimori goes to kiss him, but the ride ends before she can. They then have a blast at the park, and as night falls, they head to a high-end restaurant. After leaving, Shikimori remembers the commercial for the park, which features a couple kissing. She then asks Izumi to the "thing" from the commercial, but he instead does other things shown in the video. Izumi later realizes what she really meant. They then board a gondola ride, but a power outage leaves them stranded. Only being able to see each other, Izumi recalls Shikimori's fear of him drifting away from her. To reassure her, he succeeds in kissing her in the cheek, and telling her that he loves her, and will always be with her. A delighted Shikimori embraces him tightly as the lights come back on, exclaiming how she is happier than in any dream. Back in school, Shikimori tells Nekozaki and Hachimitsu what happened, and promises to be more open-hearted like Izumi, as Hachimitsu accepts it as long as they are happy.

== Reception ==
By February 2023, the manga had over 4.6 million copies in circulation.

== See also ==
- NakiNagi, another manga series by the same author
