= Otome Shinto =

Japanese idol group

- Origin: Japan
- Genres: J-pop
- Years active: 2012–July 2016
- Labels: Fuwafuwa Records (2013–2014); VAP (2014–2016)

Otome Shinto (乙女新党, Otome Shintō) was a Japanese idol group, consisting of six girls. It was dissolved on July 3, 2016.

== Members ==
See also: "Otome Shinto", § "Members" in the Japanese Wikipedia.

=== Final lineup ===
Name	Birth date	Age	Member Color	Notes
Yurika Takahashi	July 22, 1997	27	Pink	Leader
Ayame Tajiri	May 28, 1998	26	Yellow	
Mayu Ogata	October 15, 1999	25	Green	Joined the group on July 5, 2014
Mari Aihara	December 24, 1999	25	Blue	Joined the group on July 5, 2014
Arisa Sonohara	August 24, 2001	23	Red	Joined the group on July 5, 2014
Airi Hasegawa	August 27, 2001	23	White	Joined the group on July 5, 2014

=== Former members ===
Name	Birth date	Age	Member Color	Notes
Wakana Aoi	June 30, 1998	26	Blue	Left the group on July 5, 2014
Chika Arakawa	July 29, 1999	25	Red	Left the group on July 5, 2014

=== Timeline ===
- Blue (vertical) = Digital Singles
- Red (vertical) = Singles
- Green (vertical) = Albums
- Yellow (vertical) = DVDs

== Discography ==
=== Singles ===
No.	Title	Release date	Charts
No.	Title	Release date	JPN
1	Mōsō Kōkan Nikki (もうそう★こうかんにっき)	February 20, 2013	37
2	2 Gakki Debut Dai Sakusen!! (2学期デビュー大作戦!!)	August 7, 2013	41
3	Ojuken Rock'n'roll (お受験ロッケンロール)	November 27, 2013	39
4	Sakura Countdown (サクラカウントダウン)	March 5, 2014	23
5	Viva! Otome no Daibōken!! (ビバ！乙女の大冒険っ!!)	November 26, 2014	14
6	Kimi to Pīkan Natsu Sengen (キミとピーカン☆NATSU宣言っ!!!)	May 27, 2015	15
7	Tsuchinoko tte Iru to Omō...? (ツチノコっていると思う…？♡)	November 18, 2015	16
8	Ame to Namida to Otome to Taiyaki (雨と涙と乙女とたい焼き)	March 2, 2016	12

==== Digital singles ====
1. "Dekoboko Kaiketsu Sensation" (凸凹解決せんせーしょん) (by the subunit "Ayame to Yurika from Otome Shintō" (あやめと優里花 from 乙女新党)) (July 30, 2014)

=== Albums ===
No.	Album details	Charts
No.	Album details	JPN
1	Otome Shintō Dai Ichi Maku: Hajimari no Uta (乙女新党 第一幕 〜始まりのうた〜): Released: June 25, 2014	39
2	Otome Shinto Dai Ni Maku: Tabidachi no Uta (乙女新党 第二幕 ～旅立ちのうた～): Released: June 29, 2016	25

=== DVDs ===
No.	Album details	Charts
No.	Album details	JPN
1	Otome Shintō 3rd One-man Live: Sotsugyō Soshite Hajimari no Uta (乙女新党 3rdワンマンライブ 〜卒業 そして始まりのうた〜): Released: August 27, 2014	47
