= List of Fighting Beauty Wulong chapters =

Fighting Beauty Wulong is a Japanese manga series written and illustrated by Yūgo Ishikawa. The story follows Mao Lan, a teenage girl who enters the world of televised martial arts utilizing her family's unique fighting style.

The manga was serialized in Shogakukan's seinen manga magazine Weekly Young Sunday from August 2002 to May 2007. Its chapters were collected into 18 tankōbon volumes and released in Japan between December 26, 2002, and December 5, 2006. A prequel tankōbon consisting of seven chapters titled Fighting Beauty Wulong Gaiden (or "Volume 0") was released alongside the first volume. The series was also published in Taiwan by Tong Li Publishing between January 1, 2004, and November 6, 2007. Shogakukan made the entire Japanese version available in digital EPUB format on August 30, 2012.

No.	Release date	ISBN
0	December 26, 2002	4-09-153010-9
battle.1 "Fighting Beauty" (格闘美神, Kakutō bishin); battle.2 "Justice Pants" (正義パンツ, Seigi pantsu); battle.3 "Technique Thief" (技盗人, Waza nusutto); battle.4 "Beauty Competition" (美の競演, Bi no kyōen); battle.5 "Mao And Tsao" (毛(マオ)と曹(ツァオ), Ke to Sō); battle.6 "The Essence Of The Fist" (拳の神髄, Ken no shinzui); battle.7 "Tsao Chun Yang" (曹春楊(ツァオチュンヤン), Sō Shun Yō)
1	December 26, 2002	4-09-153011-7
match.1 "Obsessed With You" (あなたに夢中, Anata ni muchū); match.2 "I Can't Breathe" (息もできない, Ikimodekinai); match.3 "I Want To Be A Rumor" (うわさになりたい, Uwasa ni naritai); match.4 "Escalation" (エスカレーション, Esukarēshon); match.5 "This Feeling I Can't Control" (おさえきれないこの気持ち, Osae kirenai kono kimochi); match.6 "Her And My Circumstances" (彼女と私の事情, Kanojo to watashi no jijō); match.7 "Dangerous Duo" (危険なふたり, Kikenna futari); match.8 "Climax Together" (クライマックス御一緒に, Kuraimakkusu o issho ni); match.9 "Care For Me" (Careしてあげて, Care shite agete); match.10 "Broken Engine" (壊れたエンジン, Kowareta enjin)
2	March 5, 2003	4-09-153012-5
match.11 "The Dice Were Thrown" (賽（さい）は投げられた, Sai wa nage rareta); match.12 "Be A Virtuous Person" (じんじんさせて, Jinjin sasete); match.13 "Supersonic Generation"; match.14 "A World For The Two Of Us" (世界は二人のために, Sekai ha futari no tameni); match.15 "That's Your Good Point" (それがあなたのいいところ, Sore ga anata no ī tokoro); match.16 "Begging For A Time Machine" (タイムマシンにおねがい, Taimumashin nionegai); match.17 "Cheep Hippies"; match.18 "Strong And Ephemeral People" (強く儚（はかな）い者たち, Tsuyoku hakana ishatachi); match.19 "Departures"; match.20 "Unstoppable" (どうにもとまらない, Dōnimo tomaranai); match.21 "I'm So Sad I Could Cry" (泣けちゃうほどせつないけど, Nake chau hodo setsunaikedo)
3	June 5, 2003	4-09-153013-3
match.22 "Did You See The Rainbow" (虹をみたかい, Niji o mita ka); match.23 "Muddy" (ぬかる, Nukaru); match.24 "Twisted Heart" (ねじれたハートで, Nejireta hāto de); match.25 "No More Tears"; match.26 "Hammer" (ハンマー, Hanmā); match.27 "Labyrinth Of Light And Shadow" (光と影の迷宮, Hikatokage no meikyū); match.28 "Friends" (フレンズ, Furenzu); match.29 "Calm" (へっちゃら, Hetchara); match.30 "Boy Hunt" (ボーイ・ハント, Bōi hanto); match.31 "Fullness" (まんをじして, Manojishite); match.32 "Unfinished Melody" (未完成のメロディ, Mikansei no merodi)
4	September 5, 2003	4-09-153014-1
match.33 "My Heart Is Pounding" (胸がドキドキ, Munegadokidoki); match.34 "Maybe I'm Amazed"; match.35 "If Tomorrow Is" (もしも明日が, Moshimo ashita ga); match.36 "Gentle Demon" (やさしい悪魔, Yasashī akuma); match.37 "Sign Of Courage" (勇気のしるし, Yūki no shirushi); match.38 "Breath At Dawn" (夜明けのブレス, Yoake no buresu); match.39 "Ride On Time"; match.40 "Real"; match.41 "Look A-Head"; match.42 "Lady Navigation"; match.43 "Lonely Soldier"
5	December 5, 2003	4-09-153015-X
match.44 "World Groove"; match.45 "Everytime You Meet" (逢うたびに君は, Au tabi ni kimi wa); match.46 "Invisible"; match.47 "Um... Trouble" (Um…こまった, Um… komatta); match.48 "Exclamation Mark" (エクスクラメーション・マーク, Ekusukuramēshon māku); match.49 "Dancer" (踊り子, Odoriko); match.50 "Camouflage" (カムフラージュ, Kamufurāju); match.51 "Dangerous Goddess" (危険な女神, Kikenna megami); match.52 "Crazy Beat Goes On!"; match.53 "Guerilla"; match.54 "High Pressure Girl" (高気圧ガール, Kōkiatsu gāru)
6	March 5, 2004	4-09-153016-8
match.55 "Survival Dance"; match.56 "Signal"; match.57 "Stop Motion"; match.58 "Battlefield Madonna" (戦場のマドンナ, Senjō no madonna); match.59 "Even If It Hurts" (それが痛みでも, Sore ga itami demo); match.60 "I Just Want To Cry" (ただ泣きたくなるの, Tada nakitaku naru no); match.61 "Sister Trip" (ちょっとそこ行くネエチャン, Chotto soko iku nēchan); match.62 "Cold Rain" (冷たい雨, Tsumetai ame); match.63 "Low Pressure Boy" (低気圧ボーイ, Teikiatsu bōi); match.64 "What Are You Doing" (どうしてますか, Dōshitemasu ka); match.65 "Nothing To Lose"
7	June 4, 2004	4-09-153017-6
match.66" I Hate But Love" (憎いあンちくしょう, Nikuianchi kushō); match.67 "Wet Osaka" (ぬれて大阪, Nurete Ōsaka); match.68 "Next Stage"; match.69 "No Pain No Gain"; match.70 "Hard Days Night"; match.71 "Around The Left Chest" (左胸あたり, Samune atari); match.72 "Two People Suddenly" (2人はいきなり, 2-Ri wa ikinari); match.73 "Hate Tell A Lie"; match.74 "Point Of No Return"; match.75 "Mindgame" (マインドゲーム, Maindogēmu); match.76 "Invisible World" (見えない世界, Mienai sekai)
8	September 3, 2004	4-09-153018-4
match.77 "Between Conscious And Unconscious" (無意識と意識の間（はざま）で, Muishiki to ishiki no ma (hazama) de); match.78 "Moebius' Eyes" (メビウスの瞳, Mebiusu no hitomi); match.79 "The Way You Cannot Return" (戻れない道, Modorenaidō); match.80 "Like A Demoness" (夜叉のように, Yasha no yō ni); match.81 "Those Who Are Not Loose" (ゆるぎない者達, Yuruginai monotachi); match.82 "Yin and Yang" (陽と陰, Yō to in); match.83 "Runaway From Yesterday"; match.84 "Lipstick" (リップスティック, Rippusutikku); match.85 "Looking For"; match.86 "Lazy Girl"; match.87 "Royal Straight Flush" (ロイヤル・ストレート・フラッシュ, Roiyaru sutorēto furasshu)
9	January 5, 2005	4-09-153019-2
match.88 "Trap" (罠, Wana); match.89 "Runaway To The End Without Tomorrow" (明日なき暴走の果てに, Ashita naki bōsō no hate); match.90 "Even If You Give Your Life" (命かけても, Inochi kakete mo); match.91 "Angels On The Backstreet" (裏どおりの天使たち, Uradōri no tenshi tachi); match.92 "Your Smile Is Lost" (笑顔は君の忘れ物, Egao wa kimi no wasuremono); match.93 "Female Wounds" (女のきず, On'na no kizu); match.94 "Like Fire In The Wind" (風の中の火のように, Kaze no naka no hi no yō ni); match.95 "I Will Win Today Tomorrow" (今日の我に明日は勝つ, Kyō no ga ni ashita wa katsu); match.96 "Bite The Lips" (唇をかみしめて, Kuchibiru o kamishimete); match.97 "Limit Break" (限界破裂, Genkaiharetsu); match.98 "Be Beautiful While Being Broken" (こわれながら美しくなれ, Kowarenagara utsukushiku nare)
10	April 5, 2005	4-09-153020-6
match.99 "It's Not A Game" (ざけんじゃねぇぞ, Zaken janē zo); match.100 "Schoolgirl Determination" (女学生の決意, Jogakusei no ketsui); match.101 "Saying Goodbye To All Sorrow" (すべての悲しみにさよならするために, Subete no kanashimini sayonara suru tame ni); match.102 "Warrior's Rest" (戦士の休息, Senshi no kyūsoku); match.103 "And I'm At A Loss" (そして僕は途方に暮れる, Soshite boku wa tohō ni kureru); match.104 "The Sure Thing Is In The Dark" (確かなものは闇の中, Tashikana mono wa yami no naka); match.105 "Little Sentiment" (ちっぽけな感傷, Chippokena kanshō); match.106 "Broken-Winged Angel" (翼の折れたエンジェル, Tsubasa no oreta enjeru); match.107 "I'm Glad I Met You" (出会えてよかった, Deaete yokatta); match.108 "I Don't Know What Will Happen" (どうなるかわからないけど, Dō naru ka wakaranaikedo); match.109 "Storm Of Whys?" (なぜ？の嵐, Naze? No arashi)
11	August 5, 2005	4-09-153241-1
match.110 "Pathway Of Blade-cut Pines" (刃傷松の廊下, Ninjōmatsu no rōka); match.111 "Aim" (狙いうち, Nerai uchi); match.112 "Competent Rivals Hide Their Claws" (能あるライバルは爪を隠す, Nō aru raibaru wa tsumewokakusu); match.113 "When The Bomb Drops" (爆弾が落っこちる時, Bakudan ga okkochiru toki); match.114 "Are You Afraid" (ビビってたまるか, Bibitte tamaru ka); match.115 "Like A Mysterious Trick" (不思議な手品のように, Fushigina tejina noyōni); match.116 "Pegasus Girl" (ペガサスの少女, Pegasasu no shōjo); match.117 "I Have Wings on My Back" (ボクの背中には羽根がある, Boku no senaka ni wa hane gāru); match.118 "Don't Lose I Don't Want To Lose" (負けない負けたくない, Makenai maketakunai); match.119 "Melody Of Massacre" (皆殺しのメロディ, Minagoroshi no merodi); match.120 "Invincible Venus" (無敵のビーナス, Muteki no bīnasu)
12	November 4, 2005	4-09-153242-X
match.121 "Aim For The Heavens" (めざせ天下一, Mezase tenkaichi); match.122 "If It Doesn't Suit You" (もしもあなたに会わなければ, Moshimo anata ni awanakereba); match.123 "She Was Amazing After All" (やっぱり彼女はスゴかった, Yappari kanojo wa sugo katta); match.124 "How To End A Gloomy Night" (憂鬱な夜の殺し方, Yūutsuna yoru no koroshi kata); match.125 Dangerous Without Mercy!" (容赦なくデンジャラス！, Yōshanaku denjarasu!); match.126 "Rumble Fish" (ランブル・フィッシュ, Ranburu fisshu); match.127 "Eyes of Rebirth" (輪廻の瞳, Rinne no hitomi); match.128 "Tear Song" (涙唄, Namida uta); match.129 "0 Point Champion" (0点チャンピオン, 0-Ten chanpion); match.130 "Old Man's Tweet" (老人のつぶやき, Rōjin no tsubuyaki); match.131 "My Great Way" (私のすごい方法, Watashi no sugoi hōhō)
13	February 3, 2006	4-09-151048-5
match.132 "Storm Carnival" (嵐のカーニバル, Arashi no kānibaru); match.133 "Let's Go!" (いきまっしょい！, Ikimasshoi!); match.134 "I Can't Say It Well" (うまく言えないけど, Umaku ienaikedo); match.135 "Tell Me An Eternal Lie" (永遠の嘘をついてくれ, Eien no uso o tsuite kure); match.136 "Don't Fall Madonna" (堕ちないでマドンナOchinaide madon'na); match.137 "Karate Fool Ichidai" (空手バカ一代, Karate baka ichidai); match.138 "Technique Or Relief" (救済の技法, Kyūsai no gihō); match.139 "Which Is The Gunbai" (軍配はどっちにあが, Gunbai wa dotchi ni a ga); match.140 "Beast Storm" (ケダモノの嵐, Kedamono no arashi); match.141 "Have You Ever Had A Clear Heart" (心が晴れたことがあるか, Kokoro ga hareta koto ga aru ka); match.142 "The Man From The End" (最果てから来た男, Saihate kara kita otoko)
14	May 5, 2006	4-09-151083-3
match.143 "Show Without Invitation" (招待状のないショー, Jōtaijō no nai shō); match.144 "Great Man's Song" (すごい男の唄, Sugoi otoko no uta); match.145 "Warrior, Get Up!" (戦士よ、起ち上がれ！; Senshi yo, tachi agare!); match.146 "It Comes Suddenly" (それは突然やってくる, Sore wa totsuzen yattekuru); match.147 "The Battle Is Not Over" (戦いはおわらない!!, Tatakai wa owaranai!!); match.148 "Small Miracle" (小さな奇蹟, Chīsana kiseki); match.149 "I'll Keep Up" (ついていくよ, Tsuite iku yo); match.150 "Thorough Fate" (徹底的運命, Tetteiteki unmei); match.151 "Friends From a Distant Land" (遠い国の友達, Tōi kuni no tomodachi); match.152 "What Are You Doing!" (何ボの者じゃい！, Nan bo no mono ja i!); special match "Virgin Group Struggle!" (おとめ組奮闘す！, Otome-gumi funtō su!)
15	August 4, 2006	4-09-151109-0
match.153 "Accursed New Face" (にくまれそうなNEWフェイス, Ni kuma re-sōna nyū feisu); match.154 "Only One Wish" (願い事ひとつだけ, Negaigoto hitotsudake); match.155 "Rising Dragon" (昇り竜, Nobori ryū); match.156 "Reward For The Rebellion" (反逆の報酬, Hangyaku no hōshū); match.157 "A Miserable Battle" (悲惨な戦い, Hisan'na tatakai); match.158 "Unnatural Like You" (不自然な君が好き, Fushizenna kimiga suki); match.159 "Mediocre Happy is Not Enough" (平凡なハッピーじゃ物足りない, Heibon'na happī ja monotarinai); match.160 "Flame Go Fight" (炎のゴー・ファイト, Honō no gō faito); match.161 "Kiss The Magic Ring" (魔法のリングにkissをして, Mahō no ringu ni kiss o shite); match.162 "Right Hand On My Right Hand" (右手を私の右手の上に, Migite o watashi no migite no ue ni); match.163 "Expressionless" (無表情, Muhyōjō)
16	December 5, 2006	4-09-151139-2
match.164 "I Want To Open My Eyes And See You First" (目を開けて最初に君を見たい, Me o akete saisho ni kimi o mitai); match.165 "I Don't Love You Anymore" (もう誰も愛さない, Mō dare mo aisa nai); match.166 "Desperation" (やぶれかぶれ, Yaburekabure); match.167 "Fluctuation" (ゆらぎ, Yuragi); match.168 "Profile Finale" (横顔のフィナーレ, Yokogao no fināre); match.169 "Chaos" (乱, Ran); match.170 "Refrain" (リフレイン, Rifurein); match.171 "Flow" (流転, Ruten); match.172 "Let Me Go"; match.173 "Rondo" (輪舞曲（ロンド）); match.174 "Wild Blood"
17	March 5, 2007	978-4-09-151164-5
match.175 "Two Dangerous People" (あぶない2人, Abunai 2-ri); match.176 "Yes-No"; match.177 "Thread Of Destiny" (運命の糸, Unmei no ito); match.178 "Every Day"; match.179 "Tell Me" (教えて, Oshiete); match.180 "Past" (過去, Kako); match.181 "The End Of The Trajectory" (軌跡の果て, Kiseki no hate); match.182 "Cry Baby Cry"; match.183 "Dramatic Moment" (劇的な瞬間, Gekitekina shunkan); match.184 "My Soul Is About To Break" (壊れかけのMy Soul, Koware kake no My Soul); match.185 "Cruel Night" (残酷な夜, Zankokuna yoru)
18	June 5, 2007	978-4-09-151208-6
match.186 "Conflict" (修羅, Shura); match.187 "Storm"; match.188 "Save Me"; match.189 "Beyond That" (その先にあるもの, Sono sakini aru mono); match.190 "Cliff" (断崖, Dangai); match.191 "Torn Love" (ちぎれた愛, Chigiretaai); match.192 "Strong Feelings Strong Love" (強い気持ち・強い愛, Tsuyoi kimochi tsuyoi ai); match.193 "Waving Goodbye" (手を振ってさよなら, Te o futte sayonara); match.194 "As Time Goes By" (時の過ぎゆくままに, Toki no sugi yuku mama ni); match.195 "I'm Hit With Tears" (涙とたたかってる Namida to tatakatteru); final match "Beyond The Rainbow" (虹の彼方へ, Niji no kanata e)
