= Kasane (disambiguation) =

Kasane is a town in Botswana.

Kasane may also refer to:

- Kasane Airport in Botswana
- Kasane, Bhiwandi, a village in India
- Kasane (manga), a Japanese comic series
- Kasane Teto, a virtual singer
