= Mushinuyun =

Japanese manga series

- First tankōbon volume cover

ムシヌユン
- Genre: Science fiction
- Manga
- Written by: Daisaku Tsuru
- Published by: Shogakukan
- Imprint: Big Superior Comics
- Magazine: Big Comic Superior
- Original run: December 13, 2013 – January 12, 2018
- Volumes: 6
- icon

Mushinuyun (ムシヌユン) (Note: According to the author, the title comes from Mushi no Yo (虫の世), meaning "Insect World".) is a Japanese manga series written and illustrated by Daisaku Tsuru. It was serialized in Shogakukan's seinen manga magazine Big Comic Superior from December 2013 to January 2018, with its chapters collected in six tankōbon volumes.

== Plot ==
27-year-old Akihito Uehara dreamed of becoming an entomologist since childhood, but despite trying for five years, fails to enter graduate school. With his allowance cut off, unable to find a job or pay rent, Uehara is forced to return to his home island of Yonase, Okinawa. Upon arriving, he finds the remote island to be overrun by tourists viewing the Tango star cluster. Uehara visits his mother to ask for help, but she tells him he is on his own. As Uehara, who has a communication disorder, wanders the island, he runs into people from his childhood, including Shinjou Kanako, his first love. She helps him collect a rare fire ant species, but her husband Nishihara takes her away. Uehara runs into a nearby forest and watches them have sex. As the Tango cluster becomes visible, light emits from it, and Uehara comes across an otherworldly insect that bites him. Uehara's body splits apart, and after he is reconstituted, he finds that his penis has been replaced with a large appendage and that he cannot control his lust towards women.

== Publication ==
Written and illustrated by Daisaku Tsuru, Mushinuyun was serialized in Shogakukan's seinen manga magazine Big Comic Superior from December 13, 2013, to January 12, 2018. Shogakukan collected its chapters in six tankōbon volumes, released from July 30, 2014, to January 30, 2018.

=== Volumes ===
No.	Japanese release date	Japanese ISBN
1	July 30, 2014	978-4-09-186236-5
01. Minami no Shima no Tango Seidan (南の島のタンゴ星団); 02. Bōkyaku Airandā (忘却アイランダー); 03. Mushi to Hoshi (虫と星); 04. Yōkoso Jinrui (ようこそ人類); 05. Asagata Adamu Ibu (朝方アダムイブ); 06. Eden no Kusari (エデンの鎖); 07. Mori no Oku kara Kita Otoko (森の奥から来た男)
2	April 30, 2015	978-4-09-187100-8
08. Genba no Chūshin de Ai o Sakenda Kemono (現場の中心でアイを叫んだけもの); 09. Wārudo Obu Genba (ワールド・オブ・現場); 10. Sebiro-tachi ni Sasageru Banka (背広たちに捧げる挽歌); 11. Sei to Shi o Nitsumete (生と死を煮詰めて); 12. Tōsō kara no Jiyū (逃走からの自由); 13. Eden no Honō (エデンの炎); 14. Katsuage (KA・TSU・A・GE); 15. Hana Hiraku Kokan-tachi (花開く股間たち)
3	January 29, 2016	978-4-09-187548-8
16. Watashi no Aishita Hakase (私の愛した博士); 17. Europa Kuraishisu (エウロパ・クライシス); 18. Hakase no Aishita Sūshiki no Watashi (博士の愛した数式の私); 19. Okashi no Mon ga Hiraku Toki (犯しの門が開く時); 20. Gettō no Yoru...Boku-tachi no Okashi (月桃の夜…僕たちの犯し); 21. Ōto suru Wakusei (嘔吐する惑星); 22. Kantorīrōdo de Uōkingudeddo (カントリーロードでウオーキングデッド); 23. Uōkingu Wizu Megami no Danzai (ウオーキングウィズ女神の断罪); 24. Shikoshiko Za Wārudo (シコシコ・ザ・ワールド); 25. Nevā Nevā Endingu Sutōrī (ネヴァネヴァエンディングストーリー)
4	January 30, 2017	978-4-09-189744-2
26. Kanako no Kumo Taiji (かなこのクモ退治); 27. Furīzu Animaru Maemuki (フリーズアニマル MA・E・MU・KI); 28. Joō Heika no Sagyōba (女王陛下の作業場); 29. Tatta Hitotsu no Moteru Yarikata (たったひとつのモテるやり方); 30. Kumo no Hitomi (クモの瞳); 31. Watashi o Uchū e Tsurete Tte (私を宇宙へ連れてって); 32. Dāwin no Shisha (ダーウィンの使者); 33. Hiiro no Kenkyū (緋色の研究); 34. Nozomazaru Kakusei (望まざる覚醒); 35. Tango Seidan no Shinjitsu (タンゴ星団の真実)
5	October 30, 2017	978-4-09-189448-9
36. Sayonara Nippon (さよならニッポン); 37. Rizōto Rinchi (リゾート・リンチ); 38. Mushihikiabu no Tatakai (ムシヒキアブの戦い); 39. Jigoku to wa Rabu no Fuzai Nari (地獄とはLOVEの不在なり); 40. Temēe no Jinsei no Monogatari (手前ェの人生の物語); 41. Futatsu no Sekai (二つの世界); 42. Rizōto Hoteru ni Ikitai Kā? (リゾートホテルに行きたいかーっ？); 43. Nesuto Daibā (ネスト・ダイバー); 44. Nesuto Ravāzu (ネスト・ラヴァーズ); 45. Rikoteki na Kanojo (利己的な彼女)
6	January 30, 2018	978-4-09-189840-1
46. Sayonara Jinrui (さよなら人類); 47. Kami no Shitsu (神の失); 48. Buraindo Wotchimeikā (ブラインド・ウォッチメイカー); 49. Mushi no Yo (虫の世); 50. Nesuto Faitā (ネスト・ファイター); 51. Nesuto Ravāzu Tsū (ネスト・ラヴァーズ2); 52. Watashi o Uchū e Tsurete Tte Tsū (私を宇宙へ連れてって2); Final. Airando (アイランド)

== Reception ==
Mushinuyun was one of the Jury Recommended Works at the 18th Japan Media Arts Festival in 2014. The series ranked fifth on "The Best Manga 2015 Kono Manga wo Yome!" ranking by Freestyle magazine. It was nominated for the Sugoi Japan Award in 2017.
