= Ryōko Tateishi =

Japanese actor and seiyū (1951–2020)

- 立石 涼子
- Born: 立石 凉子 (Ryōko Tateishi); 4 December 1951; Nagasaki, Nagasaki Prefecture, Japan
- Died: 2 August 2020 (aged 68); Iwakuni, Yamaguchi, Japan
- Occupation: Actor
- Years active: 1974–2020
- Website: Official website

Ryōko Tateishi (立石 涼子, Tateishi Ryōko; 4 December 1951 – 2 August 2020), real name 立石凉子 (pronounced the same, but the third kanji is slightly different) was a Japanese stage, movie, television, and voice-over actress from Nagasaki, the capital city of Nagasaki Prefecture. She appeared in many theatrical works directed by Yukio Ninagawa. She appeared in the Japanese television dramas Third Year Class B Mr. Kinpachi, From the North Country, and Downtown Rocket.

She joined the Engeki Shūdan En troupe in 1976, staying with them until 2015, when she moved to Sis Company. She won an individual award at the 39th Kinokuniya Awards in 2004. Her final stage appearance was in a 2019 adaptation of Crime and Punishment.

After being diagnosed with lung cancer in September 2019, Tateishi's health became worse in June 2020, and she died of lung cancer on 2 August 2020 in Tokyo at age 68.

== Biography ==
Ryōko Tateishi grew up in Nagasaki, graduating from Nagasaki Prefectural Nagasaki Minami High School. After graduation, she worked as a flight attendant on international flights for an airline before switching to acting because there were no age restrictions and she could make it a lifelong career. She studied acting at a school operated by Bungakuza, graduating in 1974 and joining Kumo Theatre Company. The following year, that company split, and she moved to En. She studied abroad in London in 1996 for a year, including at École Philippe Gaulier, as part of an Agency for Cultural Affairs program.

Throughout her career, she appeared in many theatrical works directed by Yukio Ninagawa. She appeared in numerous Japanese television dramas, including Third Year Class B Mr. Kinpachi, From the North Country, and Downtown Rocket. She moved to Sis Company in 2015. At the 39th Kinokuniya Awards in 2004, she won an individual award. Sankei Sports noted that she was a "famous supporting actor".

Her final stage appearance was in a 2019 adaptation of Crime and Punishment. In September 2019, she was diagnosed with lung cancer. Pornography, a 2020 performance she planned to be in, was delayed due to the COVID-19 pandemic in Japan. Her health became worse in June 2020, and she died of lung cancer on 2 August 2020 in Tokyo at age 68.

== Roles ==
Roles are listed chronologically, and starring/main roles are bolded.

=== Films ===
- Hata from Class 4-3 (四年三組のはた, Yonen Sangumi no Hata) (February 1975, Nikkatsu) – **Kimura-sensei**
- Teacher (せんせい, Sensei) (August 1983, Eizo Kikaku) – Fumiko Yamaguchi
- Tokei – Adieu l'hiver (October 1986, Nippon Herald Films) – Koneko
- Love Bites Back (噛む女, Kamu Onna) (July 1988, Nikkatsu) – Host
- Ring, Ring, Ring: The Champion Belt of Tears (リング・リング・リング 涙のチャンピオンベルト, Ringu Ringu Ringu: Namida no Chanpion Beruto) (May 1993, Toei) – Ryōko Kimura
- Coquille (コキーユ 貝殻, Kokiiyū kaigara) (March 1999, Shochiku)
- Spiderman. (くも漫。, Kumoman.) (February 2017, Creative Nexus) – Manabu's mother
- Cherry Boys (チェリーボーイズ, Cherī Bōizu) (February 2018, Toei Video) – Kazuyo Kunimori
- Your Wife Requires Special Handling (奥様は、取り扱い注意, Okusama ha, Toriatsukai Chūi) (March 2021, NTV) – herself

=== Stage ===
- Much Ado About Nothing (1979)
- The Savior Cat Lolita Is Now... (救いの猫ロリータは今…, Sukui no Neko Rorīta wa Ima…) (1985)
- Crossing the River in Summer (川を渡る夏, Kawa o Wataru Natsu) (1986)
- Richard III (1987)
- Kyōko (今日子) (1989)
- A Streetcar Named Desire (1989)
- Ring Ring Ring (リング・リング・リング, Ringu Ringu Ringu) (1991)
- Three Sisters (1993)
- The Elephant Vanishes (エレファント・バニッシュ, Erefanto Banisshu) (2003–2004, based on "The Elephant Vanishes" by Haruki Murakami)
- Far From Shibuya (シブヤから遠く離れて, Shibuya kara Tōku Hanarete) (2004)
- Valkyrie of the Midnight Sun (白夜の女騎士, Byakuya no Warukyūre) (2006)
- 'Tis Pity She's a Whore (July 2006, Theatre Cocoon) – Hippolita
- Nice Age (ナイス・エイジ, Naisu Eiji) (December 2006, Nylon 100 °C at Honda Theater)
- Shunkin (春琴) (2008, appeared with Eri Fukatsu)
- The Original Two-Faced Frog Battle (表裏源内蛙合戦, Hyōri Gennai Kaeru Gassen) (2008)
- Glass Mask (August – September 2008, at the Kitakyushu Performing Arts Center, Sai-no-Kuni Saitama Arts Theater, and Theater Brava!) – Haru Kitajima
- Bedroom Fantasy (ベッドルーム・ファンタジー, Beddorūmu Fantajī) (October – November 2009, at Le Theatre Ginza) –
- Glass Mask: The Two Helens (ガラスの仮面 〜二人のヘレン〜, Garasu no Kamen: Futari no Heren) (August – September 2010, at the Sai-no-Kuni Saitama Arts Theater and Theater Brava!) – Haru Kitajima
- The Glass Menagerie (March – April 2012, at the Shibuya Theatre Cocoon, appeared with Eri Fukatsu) – **Amanda Wingfield**
- The Tale of Princess Hinoura (日の浦姫物語, Hinoura-hime Monogatari) (November – December 2012, at the Shibuya Theatre Cocoon)
- Total Eclipse (皆既食, Kaikishoku) (directed by Yukio Ninagawa, the 1967 play by Christopher Hampton, at Bunkamura Theater Cocoon (November 2014), Theater Brava! (December 2014)) – Eugenie Krantz
- Drifting Chronicles (放浪記, Hōrōki) (2015, at Theatre Creation and other venues) – Kishi
- Anna Christie (, at the Yomiuri Otemachi Hall and Umeda Arts Theater, directed by Tamiya Kuriyama) – Marthy Owen
- Crime and Punishment (January – February 2019) – Pulkheria Alexandrovna Raskolnikova and Alyona Ivanovna

=== Television ===
1970s

- Suddenly a Man (突如として男が, Totsujō Toshite Otoko ga) (1975, NTV)
- Ōedo Sōsamō (Dec 1976, ep.168, Channel 12) – guest star
- Iroha no "I" (いろはの"い") (Dec 1976, ep.21, NTV) – Kyōko Oda
- Pola TV Stories (ポーラテレビ小説, Pōra Terebi Shōsetsu) Part 17: "Little Fish" (さかなちゃん, Sakana-chan) (Oct 1976 – Apr 1977, 130 episodes, TBS) – Noriko
- The Twenty-Faced Monster (怪人二十面相, Kaijin ni Jūmensō) (Jun 1977, ep.22, Fuji TV) – guest star
- The Three Towers (三つ首塔, Mitsu Kubitō) (Jun 1977, ep.2, MBS) – guest star
- Tomorrow's Detective (明日の刑事, Ashita no Keiji) (1978, eps.14 (Jan) and 40 (Aug), TBS) – guest star
- The Great UFO War: Fight, Red Tiger! (UFO大戦争 戦え! レッドタイガー, UFO Daisensō: Tatakae! Reddo Taigā) (Sep 1978, ep.26, Channel 12) – guest star
- Gossip Detectives Tommy and Matsu (噂の刑事トミーとマツ, Uwasa no Keiji Tomī to Matsu) series 1 (Oct 1979, ep.3, TBS/Daiei TV) – guest star

1980s

- Special Investigation Front Line (特捜最前線, Tokusō Saizensen) (Sep 1980 – Dec 1984, 6 episodes), ANB) – guest star
- Police Superintendent K (警視-K, Keishi-K) (Oct 1980, ep.1, NTV) – Yoshiko Ueyama
- The Cruel License (非情のライセンス, Hijō no Raisensu) series 3 (Nov 1980, ep.25, ANB) – guest star
- Metropolitan Police Department Homicide Department (警視庁殺人課, Keishichō Satsujinka) (28 Sep 1981, ep.25, ANB) – guest star
- From the North Country (北の国から, Kita no Kuni kara) (Oct 1981 – Mar 1982, 24 episodes, Fuji TV) – Yuriko Nakahata
- Dai Sentai Goggle-V (26 Jun 1982, ep.21, ANB) – Mrs. Hamada
- The Vanished School Bus: Kindergarten Group Disappearance: "It Started Happening Since the Summer Festival" (消えたスクールバス 園児集団蒸発「それは夏祭りから始まった」, Kieta Sukūru Basu: Enji Shūdan Jōhatsu "Sore wa Natsu Matsuri kara Hajimatta") (24 Jul 1982, TBS)
- Seichō Matsumoto Special 9: Restraint (松本清張スペシャル9・歯止め, Matsumoto Seichō Supesharu 9: Hadome) (5 Apr 1983, NTV) – Drug Store Owner
- Ginga TV Stories: Ganbattannen (銀河テレビ小説 がんばったンねん) (2–27 May 1983, part 141 (20 episodes), NHK) – **Ryōhei's older sister**
- Riyako Asabuki, Attorney (女弁護士 朝吹里矢子, Onna Bengoshi Asabuki Riyako) (28 May 1983, TV Asahi) – Taeko Kudō (1983)
- The New Woman Investigator (新・女捜査官, Shin Onna Sōsakan) (22 Jul 1983, ep.15, ABC) – guest star
- The Elevator of Terror (恐怖のエレベーター, Kyōfu no Erebētā) (11 Oct 1983, NTV)
- Revenge of the Children: The Case of the High School Student Murder (子供たちの復讐 開成高校生殺人事件, Kodomo-tachi no Fukushū: Keisei Kōkōsei Satsujin Jiken) (31 Oct 1983, ANB)
- House of Uncertainties (波の盆, Nami no Bon) (15 Nov 1983, NTV) – Mizue
- Genshū Hanayagi Prison Diary (花柳幻舟獄中記, Hanayagi Genshū Gokuchūki) (7 May 1984, ANB)
- Yōkirō (陽暉楼) (28 Aug 1984, 5 episodes, based on the novel by Tomiko Miyao, TBS)
- I'm Feeling Like a Great Detective (気分は名探偵, Kibun wa Meitantei) (5 Jan 1985, ep.14, NTV) – Noriko Morimura
- A Woman's Lifetime (女の一生, Onna no Isshō) (1–2 Mar 1985, 2 episodes, ABC)
- Seichō Matsumoto's Black Art Book: Himo (松本清張の黒い画集・紐, Matsumoto Seichō no Kuroi Gashū – Himo) (4 Oct 1985, CX)
- Seven Years' Reward (七年目の報酬, Nana Nenme no Hōshū) (12 Jul 1985, CX)
- The Red Secret (赤い秘密, Akai no Himitsu) (Jul – Sep 1985, 10 episodes, TBS) – Sanae Tamura's mother
- Comeback Couple: The Husband's Sudden Homemaker Declaration! (逆転夫婦 夫が突然主婦宣言!, Gyakuten Fūfu: Otto ga Totsuzen Shufu Sengen!) (24 Mar 1986, ANB)
- The Hangman V (ザ・ハングマンV, Za Hanguman V) (16 May 1986, ep.14, ABC) – Ritsuko Tozaki
- The Case of the Murder on the "Ginga" Sleeper Express (寝台急行「銀河」殺人事件, Shindai Kyūkō "Ginga" Satsujin Jiken) (28 Jun 1986, TV Asahi) – Haruko Izaki
- Howl at the Sun! Part 2 (太陽にほえろ!Part2, Taiyō ni Hoero! Part 2) (12 Dec 1986, ep.3, NTV) – neighborhood housewife
- 1am in the Big City (大都会25時, Daitokai 25-ji) (3 Jun 1987, ep.7, ANB)
- June Bride 4: The Nightmare Bride (六月の花嫁4 悪夢の花嫁, Jūn Buraido 4: Akumu no Hanayome) (23 Jun 1987, NTV) – Head Nurse
- The Bride in the Wheelchair (車椅子の花嫁, Kurumaisu no Hanayome) (22 Aug 1987, NTV)
- The Devil in the Woman (女の中の悪魔, Onna no Naka no Akuma) (21 Sep 1987, KTV)
- The Red Bash (赤いバッシュ!, Akai Basshu!) (Oct 1987 – Mar 1988, 24 episodes, KTV) – **Hiroko Tatsuki**
- The Muta Detective Agency Case Files 8 (牟田刑事官事件ファイル8, Muta Keijikan Jiken Fairu 8) (30 Apr 1988, TV Asahi) – Setsuko Mizuno
- Chōshichirō Edo Diary (長七郎江戸日記2, Chōshichirō Edo Nikki) (3 May 1988, ep.14, NTV) – Nao Aoyama
- Straying Detective Innocence Faction (はぐれ刑事純情派, Hagure Keiji Junjōha) 1st series (31 Aug 1988, ep.22, ANB) – Tadokoro's wife
- Run Away! Run Away! (逃げて逃げて…, Nigete Nigete...) (10 Dec 1988, TBS)
- Third Year Class B Mr. Kinpachi (3年B組金八先生, 3-nen B-gumi Kinpachi-sensei) (Dec 1988, ep.10–11, TBS)
- Youthful Aurora Spin: Tears of the Swan (青春オーロラ・スピン スワンの涙, Seishun Ōrora Supin: Suwan no Namida) (Apr – Sep 1989, 25 episodes, Daiei TV/CX) – Kanako's mother
- June Bride 2: The Case of the Engagement Cancellation Murder (六月の花嫁2 婚約解消殺人事件, Jūn Buraido 2: Kon'yaku Kaishō Satsujin Jiken) (13 Jun 1989, NTV)
- Straying Detective Innocence Faction (はぐれ刑事純情派, Hagure Keiji Junjōha) 2nd series (12 Jul 1989, ep.15, ANB) – Takako Enjōji
- My Beloved Husband (いとしの婿どの, Itoshi no Muko-dono) (Oct – Dec 1989, 60 episodes, THK)

1990s

- Someday with Someone (いつか誰かと, Itsuka Dare ka to) (Feb – Apr 1990, TBS)
- The Murder of the Beautiful Private Secretary (美人秘書殺し, Bijin Hisho Koroshi) (31 Mar 1990, TV Asahi) – Harumi Kitamura
- Summer-Colored Album (夏色のアルバム, Natsuiro no Arubamu) (Jul – August 1990, 30 episodes, TBS) – **Tōko Wakabayashi**
- Baian Fujieda, Instigator (仕掛人・藤枝梅安, Shikakenin Fujieda Baian) (Dec 1990 – Oct 1993, 7 episodes, Fuji TV)
- I Can't Go Home (帰れない, Kaerenai) 2nd series (3 Jan 1991, Fuji TV) – **Taeko Sawada**
- Super-Talent-Power! (超・能・力!, Chō-Nō-Ryoku!) 2nd series (9 Aug 1991, Fuji TV)
- I See Only You (あなただけ見えない, Anata Dake Mienai) (Jan – Mar 1992, 11 episodes, Fuji TV) – Shizu Yamane
- The Red Hearse (赤い霊柩車, Akai Reikyūsha) (6 Mar 1992, ep.1, Fuji TV/Kyodo Television) – Masako Ogasawara
- I've Always Loved You (ずっとあなたが好きだった, Zutto Anata ga Suki Datta) (Jul – Sep 1992, 13 episodes, TBS) – Fukui
- Lightly (ひらり, Hirari) (Oct 1992 – Apr 1993, 151 episodes, NHK) – Machiko
- Our Town (わが町, Waga Machi) (series of 10 films, films 1 (Oct 1992), 2 (May 1993), and 10 (Mar 1998), NTV) – Mutsuko Narumi / Sarah Meyer
- Night Head (13 Nov 1992, ep.6, Fuji TV/Kyodo Television) – Yumiko Futami
- Wandering Detective Traveling Mood Compilation V (さすらい刑事旅情編V, Sasurai Keiji Ryojōhen V) (1992, ep.7, TV Asahi) – Masae Yamaguchi
- Prosecutor Yūko Kasumi 10: Dark Production (女検事・霞夕子10 闇の演出, Onna Kenji Kasumi Yūko 10: Yami no Enshutsu) (17 Aug 1993, NTV) – Misao Sono
- Full Moon Travel Mood Mystery 9: Stairway to Heaven (フルムーン旅情ミステリー9 空の階段, Furu Mūn Ryjō Misuterī 9: Sora no Kaidan) (14 Dec 1993, NTV) – Mitsue Fujikawa
- Wataru Seken wa Oni Bakari 2nd series (Feb – Mar 1994, eps.44–45, TBS) – Michiko
- Kyōto Ōmi Murder Highway (京都近江殺人街道, Kyōto Ōmi Satsujin Kaidō) (Apr 1994 – Dec 1995, 6 films, NTV) – **Midori Sayama**
- Family of One (ひとり家族, Hitori Kazoku) (Sep – Oct 1994, 40 episodes, TBS) – **Ikuyo Masuda**
- Heaven's Coin (Apr – Jul 1995, 12 episodes, NTV) – Kazuko Arai
- The New Riyako Asabuki, Attorney (新・女弁護士 朝吹里矢子, Shin Onna Bengoshi Asabuki Riyako) (23 Mar 1996, TV Asahi) – Sayomi Yamashita
- The Ugly Duckling (みにくいアヒルの子, Minikui Ahiru no Ko) (Apr – Jun 1996, 11 episodes, Fuji TV) – Sumiko Matsunaga
- Case 4: The Woman Who Turned Off the Life Support Machine! The Tragic Slaying of Her Mother-in-Law... (事件4 生命維持装置を切った女！姑殺しに秘められた悲劇…, Jiken 4: Seimei Ijisōchi o Kitta Onna! Shūtome Koroshi ni Himerareta Higeki) (22 Jun 1996, TV Asahi) – Hatsuyo Maeda
- Coach (コーチ, Kōchi) (4 Jul 1996, ep. 1, Fuji TV)
- A Nurse's Job (ナースのお仕事, Nāsu no Oshigoto) (Jul – Sep 1996, 13 episodes, Fuji TV) – Junko Onodera
- Lady Detective: Otome Sakura's Casebook (おばさんデカ 桜乙女の事件帖, Obasan Deka: Sakura Otome no Jikenchō) (4 Oct 1996, ep.4, Fuji TV) – Yōko Hatano
- Narita Divorce (成田離婚, Narita Rikon) (Oct – Dec 1997, 10 episodes, Fuji TV) – Miwa Hoshino
- GTO (Jul – Sep 1998, 12 episodes, Fuji TV) – Yoshiko Uchiyamada
- Chiharu Saotome's Tour Guide Report (早乙女千春の添乗報告書, Saotome Chiharu no Denjō Hōkokusho) (23 Nov 1998, ep.7, TBS) – Yoshiko Tanaka
- Rural Reporter Yōsuke Tachibana 12: Hidatakayama Communications Bureau (地方記者・立花陽介12 飛騨高山通信局, Chihō Kisha Tachibana Yōsuke 12: Hidatakayama Tsūshinkyoku) (15 Dec 1998, NTV) – Akiko Nagao
- African Nights (アフリカの夜, Afurika no Yoru) (20 May 1999, ep.6, Fuji TV) – Owner of the snack Bar "Rei"
- Straying Detective Innocence Faction (はぐれ刑事純情派, Hagure Keiji Junjōha) 12th series (14 Jul 1999, ep.16, ANB) – Harue Kaneko
- Adding to the Wanted List 2: Nagasaki, Population 427,000: Is the Old Timer Burned Alive in the Middle of an Undercover Investigation Still Alive? Finding Out Off the Record! (指名手配2 人口42万7千人長崎市、潜入捜査中焼死した先輩が生きている?内密に探し出せ!, Shimei Tehai 2: Jinkō 42-man 7-sennin Nagasaki-shi, Sennyū Sōsachū Shōshishita Senpai ga Ikiteiru? Naimitsu ni Sagashidase!) (17 Aug 1999, NTV) – Nobue Kuwahara
- The Muta Detective Agency Case Files 27 (牟田刑事官事件ファイル27, Muta Keijikan Jiken Fairu 27) (9 Oct 1999, TV Asahi) –

2000s

- The Housekeeper Saw! 18 (家政婦は見た!18, Kaseifu wa Mita! 18) (18 Mar 2000, TV Asahi) – Yoshie Sugitani
- Emergency Room 24 Hours (救命病棟24時, Kyūmei Byōtō 24-ji) 2nd series (28 Aug 2001, ep.9, Fuji TV/Kyodo Television) – Fumiko Yamaguchi
- The Muta Detective Agency vs. Detective Ushio of the Terminus Station (牟田刑事官VS終着駅の牛尾刑事, Muta Keijikan vs. Shūchaku Eki no Ushio Keiji) (29 Dec 2001, TV Asahi) – Horiuchi-sensei
- Seichō Matsumoto Special: Waiting a Year and a Half (松本清張スペシャル・一年半待て, Matsumoto Seichō Supesharu: Ichinenhan Mate) (15 Jan 2002, NTV) – Naomi Kamimura
- Psycho Doctor (サイコドクター, Saiko Dokutā) (16 Oct 2002, ep.2, NTV) – Takako Matsumoto's mother
- Assistant Inspector Jirō Tsukuda 16: Woman's Wager (警部補 佃次郎16 女の賭け, Keibuho Tsukuda Jirō 16: Onna no Kake) (12 Nov 2002, NTV) – Head Nurse Murai
- Kyōto Labyrinth Guide (京都迷宮案内, Kyōto Meikyū Annai) 6th series (13 Nov 2003, ep.3, TV Asahi) – Ayano Morimoto
- Ryōma ga Yuku (2 Jan 2004, 4 episodes, TV Tokyo) – Otake
- Ruriko Amemiya, Financial Crimes Investigator (財務捜査官 雨宮瑠璃子, Saimu Sōsakan Amemiya Ruriko) (14 Jun 2004, ep.1, TBS) – Masako Yamazaki
- Socrates in Love (Jul – Sep 2004, 11 episodes, TBS) – Junpei Mashima's mother
- Furuhata Ninzaburō Final (Jan 2006, 3 episodes, Fuji TV) – Tamayo Horibe
- Hospital Power: Starry Sky Hospital (病院のチカラ〜星空ホスピタル〜, Byōin no Chikara: Hoshizora Hosupitaru) (Apr – May 2007, 6 episodes, NHK) – **Head Nurse Araya**
- Genius Detective Bonroku Noro 1 (天才刑事・野呂盆六1, Tensai Keiji Noro Bonroku 1) (9 Jun 2007, TV Asahi) – Kikue Tanaka
- Taichi Yamada Drama Special: Truth, Lies, and Tequila (山田太一ドラマスペシャル・本当と嘘とテキーラ, Yamada Taichi Dorama Supesharu: Hontō to Uso to Tekīra) (28 May 2008, TV Tokyo)
- The Auditor (監査法人, Kansahōjin) (Jun – Jul 2008, 6 episodes, NHK) – Yoshiko Kuwahara
- Brand Detective 3: The Case of the Counterfeit Wagyū Murder (ブランド刑事3 偽ブランド和牛殺人事件, Buranduo Deka 3: Nise Burando Wagyū Satsujin Jiken) (30 Jul 2008, TV Tokyo) – Sumie Seto
- Shinano's Columbo Detective, File 17: The Case of the Tōno Murder (信濃のコロンボ事件ファイル17 遠野殺人事件, Shinano no Koronbo Deka Fairu 17: Tōno Satsujin Jiken) (17 Dec 2008, TV Tokyo) – Michiko Miyagi
- The Quiz Show (ザ・クイズショウ, Za Kuizu Shō) (Apr – Jun 2009, 10 episodes, NTV) – Misako Katsuragi
- Woman Police Chief (女警察署長, Onna Keisatsu Shochō) (23 May 2009, TV Asahi) – Keiko Hayami
- Flower Festival (花祭, Hana Matsuri) (3 Oct 2009, CBC) – **Hisako Shirayama**

2010s

- AIBOU: Tokyo Detective Duo (16 Feb 2011, S9E15, TV Asahi) – Sanae Shigeta
- Control: Criminal Mind Investigations (Control〜犯罪心理捜査〜, Control: Hanzai Shinri Sōsa) (8 Mar 2011, episode 9, Fuji TV) – Nobuko Aoki
- Section Chief: Jinnan Station Azumi Section (ハンチョウ〜神南署安積班〜, Hanchō: Jinnansho Azumihan) (2 May 2011, S4E4, DreAmax Television/TBS) – Taeko Fukumura
- Fishing Detective 2 (釣り刑事2, Tsuri Deka 2) (9 May 2011, TBS) – Kazuko Isogai
- New Metropolitan Police Department Criminal Investigation Division 9 Duty Clerk (新・警視庁捜査一課9係, Shin Keishi-chou Sousa Ikka 9 Gakari) (31 Aug 2011, S3E9, TV Asahi) – **Tokiko Kudō**
- Law Professor Yoshiko Hodaka (司法教官・穂高美子, Shihō Kyōkan Hodaka Yoshiko) (3 Sep 2011, TV Asahi) – Satoko Toyooka
- Our Starry Dance (ボクら星屑のダンス, Bokura Hoshikuzu no Dansu) (6 Oct 2011, TV Tokyo) – Hidamari Preschool Principal
- The Secret from My Old Man: The Five Shimoarai Siblings Homecoming (親父がくれた秘密〜下荒井5兄弟の帰郷〜, Oyaji ga Kureta Himitsu: Shimoarai 5-kyōdai no Kikyō) (12 Sep 2012, TV Tokyo) – Kinu Yamazaki
- Section Chief: Jinnan Station Azumi Section (ハンチョウ〜神南署安積班〜, Hanchō: Jinnansho Azumihan) (11 Feb 2013, S6E5, DreAmax Television/TBS) – Misako Kiyose
- Kyōto Murder Lessons (京都殺人授業, Kyōto Satsujin Jugyō) (18 Feb 2013, TBS) – Tokiko Akama
- Proof: Divorce Attorney Yoshimi Katsuki (立証 離婚弁護士 香月佳美, Risshō: Rikon Bengoshi Katsuki Yoshimi) (29 May 2013, TV Tokyo)
- Retired Female Prosecutor 4 (ヤメ検の女4, Yame Ken no Onna 4) (21 Dec 2013, TV Asahi) – Harumi Yamada
- People of Fuji: The Wife of Mount Fuji (芙蓉の人〜富士山頂の妻, Fuyō no Hito: Fujisanchō no Tsuma) (Jul – Sep 2014, 6 episodes, NHK) – Kesa Satou
- Battle of the Coin (銭の戦争, Zeni no Sensou) (Jan – Mar 2015, 4 episodes, Kansai Television) – Yoshiko Igusa
- The Love Lives of Doctors (医師たちの恋愛事情, Ishi-tachi no Ren'ai Jijō) (16 Apr 2015, episode 2, Fuji TV) – Fusae Nogami
- Omote Sandō High School Chorus Club! (表参道高校合唱部!, Omote Sandō Kōkō Gasshōbu!) (Jul – Sep 2015, 10 episodes, TBS) – Tomoyo Harada
- I'm an Agent! Contract Incident Detective (私は代行屋!事件推理請負人4, Watashi wa Daikōya! Jiken Suiri Ukeoinin 4) (22 Aug 2015, TV Asahi) – Kimiko Tokunaga
- A Certain Duck Bus Day (ある日、アヒルバス, Aru Hi, Ahiru Basu) (Jul – Aug 2015, 8 episodes, NHK BS Premium) – **Momoko Tawara**
- We're Playboys: A Middle-Aged Detective Agency (僕らプレイボーイズ 熟年探偵社, Bokura Pureibōizu: Jukunen Tanteisha) (Jul – Sep 2015, 8 episodes, TV Tokyo) – Akiko Sakata
- Onna Michi (Aug – Sep 2015, 8 episodes, NHK BS Premium) – Fumiko Yamaguchi
- Sumika Sumire (スミカスミレ, Sumika Sumire) (Feb – Mar 2016, 8 episodes, TV Asahi) – Yoshie Yoshida
- Anthropologist Kumiko Misaki's Expert Homicide Analysis 6 (人類学者・岬久美子の殺人鑑定6, Jinrui Gakusha Misaki Kumiko no Satsujin Kantei 6) (11 Jun 2016, TV Asahi) – Haruyo Miymura
- The Detectives Seven (刑事7人, Keiji Shichinin) (Aug 2016, S2E4-5, TV Asahi) – Kazuko Nagasawa
- Doctor Y: Hideki Kaji, Surgeon (ドクターY〜外科医・加地秀樹〜, Dokutā Y: Gekai Kaji Hideki) (29 Sep 2016, ep.1, TV Asahi) – Yōko Tanami
- Detective Seiichi Yoshinaga: The Tearful Case Files 14 (刑事吉永誠一 涙の事件簿14, Keiji Yoshinaga Seiichi: Namida no Jikenbo 14) (28 Dec 2016, TV Tokyo) – Fumiko Tsumura
- Middle-Aged Superman Mr. Saenai (中年スーパーマン左江内氏, Chūnen Sūpāman Saenaishi) (4 Mar 2017, ep.8, NTV) – Haruko Saenai
- Crime Syndrome (犯罪症候群, Hanzai Shoukougun) (8–15 Apr 2017, S1E1-2, THK/WOWOW) – Hatsue Isomura
- Assistant Inspector Kōichi Usui (警部補・碓氷弘一, Keibuho Usui Kōichi) (9 Apr 2017, ep.1, TV Asahi) – Sae Kiriyama
- Metropolitan Police Department, First Criminal Section Chief (警視庁・捜査一課長, Keishichō Sōsa Ichi Kachō) (8 Jun 2017, S2E8, TV Asahi) – Kyōko Sakuragawa
- Izakaya Fuji (居酒屋ふじ) (Jul – Sep 2017, 12 episodes, TV Tokyo) – **Mitsuko Takahashi**
- Forgotten Investigations (遺留捜査, Iryuu Sōsa) (3 Aug 2017, S4E4, TV Asahi) – Kayoko Takehara
- Code Blue (14 Aug 2017, S3E5, Fuji TV) – Kazumi Kurata
- Headhunter (ヘッドハンター, Heddohantā) (7 May 2018, ep.4, TV Tokyo) – Mizue Matsuhara
- Immorality Police (不倫警察, Furin Keisatsu) Special Spring Edition (12 May 2018, Fuji TV) – Rie Fujimura
- Downtown Rocket (下町ロケット, Shitamachi Roketto) (Oct – Dec 2018, 11 episodes, TBS) – Kyōko Tonomura
- Under the Flowers (華の下にて, Hana no Shita ni te) (17 Dec 2018, TBS) – Tokie Matsuura
- That's Why People Mistake It for Love (それを愛とまちがえるから, Sore o Ai to Machigaeru kara) (Feb – Mar 2019, 5 episodes, WOWOW) – Haruko Itō
- The White-Robed Warrior! (白衣の戦士!, Hakui no Senshi!) (10 Apr 2019, ep.1, NTV) – Sawako Tanaka
- The Woman of the Science Research Institute (科捜研の女, Kasōken no Onna) (19 Apr 2019, S19E1, TV Asahi) – **Komine**
- Prosecutor Sagata: Hope of a Verdict (検事・佐方 〜裁きを望む〜, Kenji Sagata: Sabaki no Nozomu) (26 Dec 2019, ep., TV Asahi) – Mai Gōko

=== Voice-over work and radio ===
Dates listed are Japanese release dates. The actor she was dubbing is in parentheses when known.

- Knight Rider (1987, TV Asahi) – Gina Adams (Alexa Hamilton, S2E20)
- Elizabeth (Aug 1999, Herald) – Mary I (Kathy Burke)
- ER (2000/2004, NHK) – Hansen (S5E14), Mrs. Rasgotra (Kirron Kher, S11E2)
- Billy Elliot (Jan 2001, Kadokawa Herald Pictures) – **Sandra Wilkinson** (Julie Walters)
- Caitlin's Way (2001–2002, NHK) – **Dori** (Cynthia Belliveau)
- Star Wars (May 2002, Nippon Television) – Aunt Beru (Shelagh Fraser)
- My Big Fat Greek Wedding (Jul 2003, Warner Bros.) – **Maria Portokalos** (Lainie Kazan)
- Tuck Everlasting (2003, direct-to-video, Disney) – Mae Tuck (Sissy Spacek)
- Calendar Girls (May 2004) – **Annie Clarke** (Julie Walters)
- Spider-Man 2 (Jul 2004, SPE Japan) – other voices
- Monk (2004/2008/2010, NHK BS2) – Dolly Flint (S1E2, Linda Kash), other voices (S5, S7)
- Criminal Minds (Nov 2006, Wowow) – Ultra (S2E7)
- Ugly Betty (Oct 2009 – Mar 2010, NHK BS2) – Victoria Beckham (S2E7, Victoria Beckham)
- Alice Upside Down (Jan 2010) – Mrs. Plotkin (Penny Marshall)
- Agatha Christie's Poirot (Sep 2010, NHK) – Lady Boynton (Cheryl Campbell)
- Hugo (Dec 2011, SPE Japan) – Madame Emile (Frances de la Tour)
- Depression 9th Dan (うつ病九段, Utsubyō Kyūdan) (13 Jul 2019, FM Theater, NHK FM) – Wife of Kunio Yonenaga
