= Sabishii no wa Anta dake ja Nai =

Japanese manga series

- First tankōbon volume cover

淋しいのはアンタだけじゃない
- Genre: Non-fiction
- Manga
- Written by: Kōji Yoshimoto
- Published by: Shogakukan
- Magazine: Big Comic Superior
- Original run: January 8, 2016 – September 8, 2017
- Volumes: 3

Sabishii no wa Anta dake ja Nai (淋しいのはアンタだけじゃない; "You're Not the Only Lonely One") is a Japanese manga series about hearing disability, written and illustrated by Kōji Yoshimoto. It was serialized in Shogakukan's seinen manga magazine Big Comic Superior from January 2016 to September 2017, with its chapters collected in three tankōbon volumes.

== Publication ==
Written and illustrated by Kōji Yoshimoto, Sabishii no wa Anta dake ja Nai was serialized in Shogakukan's seinen manga magazine Big Comic Superior from January 8, 2016, to September 8, 2017. Shogakukan collected its chapters in three tankōbon volumes released from May 30, 2016, to September 29, 2017.

=== Volumes ===
No.	Japanese release date	Japanese ISBN
1	May 30, 2016	978-4-09-187609-6
2	February 28, 2017	978-4-09-189340-6
3	September 29, 2017	978-4-09-189649-0

== Reception ==
The series ranked first in the July 2016 edition of Takarajimasha's Kono Manga ga Sugoi! Web. Sabishii no wa Anta dake ja Nai was one of the Jury Recommended Works at the 20th Japan Media Arts Festival in 2017.
