= Wonderland (manga) =

Japanese manga series

- First tankōbon volume cover

ワンダーランド (Wandārando)
- Genre: Dark fantasy; Supernatural
- Manga
- Written by: Yūgo Ishikawa
- Published by: Shogakukan
- English publisher: NA: Seven Seas Entertainment
- Imprint: Big Superior Comics
- Magazine: Big Comic Superior
- Original run: April 24, 2015 – October 27, 2017
- Volumes: 6
- icon

Wonderland (Japanese: ワンダーランド, Hepburn: Wandārando) is a Japanese manga series written and illustrated by Yūgo Ishikawa. It was serialized in Shogakukan's seinen manga magazine Big Comic Superior from April 2015 to October 2017.

== Publication ==
Wonderland, written and illustrated by Yūgo Ishikawa, was serialized in Shogakukan's seinen manga magazine Big Comic Superior from April 24, 2015, to October 27, 2017. Shogakukan collected its chapters in six tankōbon volumes, released from October 30, 2015, to November 30, 2017.

In North America, the manga was licensed for English release by Seven Seas Entertainment. The six volumes were released from November 20, 2018, to October 20, 2020.

=== Volumes ===
No.	Original release date	Original ISBN	English release date	English ISBN
1	October 30, 2015	978-4-09-187298-2	November 20, 2018	978-1-626929-08-1
2	April 28, 2016	978-4-09-187600-3	March 26, 2019	978-1-626929-98-2
3	August 30, 2016	978-4-09-187738-3	August 20, 2019	978-1-642751-27-7
4	December 28, 2016	978-4-09-189264-5	November 19, 2019	978-1-642757-32-3
5	June 30, 2017	978-4-09-189514-1	March 17, 2020	978-1-64505-227-2
6	November 30, 2017	978-4-09-189690-2	October 20, 2020	978-1-64505-510-5

== Reception ==
Wonderland was picked as a nominee for "Best Comic" at the 46th Angoulême International Comics Festival held in 2019. In 2020, Wonderland was one of the manga titles that ranked on the "Top 10 Graphic Novels for Teens" by the Young Adult Library Services Association (YALSA) of the American Library Association.
