= Sumi Nigori =

Japanese manga series

- First tankōbon volume cover

住みにごり
- Genre: Drama
- Manga
- Written by: Takeshi Taka
- Published by: Shogakukan
- Imprint: Big Superior Comics
- Magazine: Big Comic Superior
- Original run: November 26, 2021 – present
- Volumes: 11

Sumi Nigori (住みにごり) is a Japanese manga series written and illustrated by Takeshi Taka. It began serialization in Shogakukan's seinen manga magazine Big Comic Superior in November 2021.

== Plot ==
Sueyoshi, a 29 year-old man, has just been given a long vacation from work, and he uses this opportunity to catch up with his family.

== Publication ==
Written and illustrated by Takeshi Taka, Sumi Nigori began serialization in Shogakukan's seinen manga magazine Big Comic Superior on November 26, 2021. Its chapters have been compiled into eleven tankōbon volumes as of October 2026.

No.	Release date	ISBN
1	April 28, 2022	978-4-09-861301-4
2	September 30, 2022	978-4-09-861417-2
3	February 28, 2023	978-4-09-861591-9
4	July 28, 2023	978-4-09-862489-8
5	December 27, 2023	978-4-09-862625-0
6	June 28, 2024	978-4-09-862803-2
7	November 28, 2024	978-4-09-863070-7
8	May 30, 2025	978-4-09-863428-6
9	November 28, 2025	978-4-09-863648-8
10	April 30, 2026	978-4-09-863896-3
11	October 30, 2026	978-4-09-864090-4

== Reception ==
The series has been recommended by filmmaker Takeshi Kitano, comedian Akira Kawashima and manga creator Keigo Shinzo.

The series was ranked sixteenth in the 2023 edition of Takarajimasha's Kono Manga ga Sugoi! guidebook for the best manga for male readers. The series was also ranked eleventh in the 2025 edition. The series was also ranked seventh in Freestyle magazine's "The Best Manga" 2023 edition.
