= Natsume Arata no Kekkon =

Japanese manga series

- First tankōbon volume cover

夏目アラタの結婚
- Genre: Psychological thriller
- Manga
- Written by: Tarō Nogizaka
- Published by: Shogakukan
- Imprint: Big Superior Comics
- Magazine: Big Comic Superior
- Original run: June 28, 2019 – January 26, 2024
- Volumes: 12
- Live-action film
- Directed by: Yukihiko Tsutsumi
- Released: September 6, 2024
- icon

Natsume Arata no Kekkon (夏目アラタの結婚; lit. 'Arata Natsume's Marriage') is a Japanese manga series written and illustrated by Tarō Nogizaka. It was serialized in Shogakukan's seinen manga magazine Big Comic Superior from June 2019 to January 2024, with its chapters collected in twelve tankōbon volumes. A live-action film adaptation premiered in September 2024.

Natsume Arata no Kekkon won the 70th Shogakukan Manga Award in 2025.

== Plot ==
Arata Natsume, who works at a child protection center, receives a request from Takuto Yamashita, the orphan of a victim of a bloody serial murder, to meet his father's killer on his behalf. Takuto had been exchanging letters with Shinju Shinagawa, the murderer, under the name of Arata in order to discover the location of his father's head, which remains unfound.

Arata decides to help Takuto and gets a prison visit with the serial killer. When the eccentric and weird Shinju infers that Arata was not the real author of the letters she decides to get up and leave. Arata, desperate for the meeting not to end, decides to shout at her impulsively that he wants to marry her. This arouses Shinju's interest, who accepts the proposal and orders her lawyer, Miyamae, who believes in her innocence, to follow the proceedings.

Arata pretends to be in love and wants to go through with the marriage proposal, particularly when Shinju seems to have changed her attitude and appears willing to collaborate with justice, revealing the location of another victim's arm, which had also not been found. Miyamae asks Arata to continue collaborating with the case so that Shinju's memory will return and she will be exonerated of guilt, suspecting that Shinju is not the murderer. Arata reluctantly decides to continue to make her believe that his marriage intentions are honest despite believing that Shinju is really the murderer and possibly wants to kill him as well.

== Characters ==
Arata Natsume (夏目 アラタ, Natsume Arata)
Voiced by: Yūki Ono (PV)
Portrayed by: Yuya Yagira
Shinju Shinagawa (品川 真珠, Shinagawa Shinju)
Voiced by: Akari Kitō (PV)
Portrayed by: Yuina Kuroshima

== Media ==
=== Manga ===
Written and illustrated by Tarō Nogizaka, Natsume Arata no Kekkon was serialized in Shogakukan's seinen manga magazine Big Comic Superior from June 28, 2019, to January 26, 2024. Shogakukan collected its chapters in twelve tankōbon volumes, released from November 29, 2019, to March 29, 2024.

==== Volumes ====
No.	Japanese release date	Japanese ISBN
1	November 29, 2019	978-4-09-860484-5
2	March 30, 2020	978-4-09-860656-6
3	July 30, 2020	978-4-09-860682-5
4	November 30, 2020	978-4-09-860769-3
5	April 30, 2021	978-4-09-860872-0
6	August 30, 2021	978-4-09-861130-0
7	January 28, 2022	978-4-09-861238-3
8	June 30, 2022	978-4-09-861238-3
9	December 28, 2022	978-4-09-861488-2
10	April 28, 2023	978-4-09-861693-0
11	September 28, 2023	978-4-09-862526-0
12	March 29, 2024	978-4-09-862692-2

=== Live-action film ===
In April 2024, it was announced that a live-action film adaptation, directed by Yukihiko Tsutsumi; it premiered on September 6 of the same year.

== Reception ==
By April 2024, the manga had over 2.4 million copies in circulation. Natsume Arata no Kekkon received the Next Manga Awards' U-Next prize in 2020. Along with Burning Kabaddi, Draw This, Then Die!, and Puniru Is a Cute Slime, Natsume Arata no Kekkon won the 70th Shogakukan Manga Award in 2025.

The series was recommended by Blue Period author Tsubasa Yamaguchi.

== See also ==
- Iryū, another manga series by Tarō Nogizaka
