= Football Nation =

Japanese manga series

- First tankōbon volume cover

フットボールネーション (Futtobōru Nēshon)
- Genre: Sports
- Manga
- Written by: Yuki Otake
- Published by: Shogakukan
- Magazine: Big Comic Superior
- Original run: December 11, 2009 – present
- Volumes: 20
- icon

Football Nation (Japanese: フットボールネーション, Hepburn: Futtobōru Nēshon) is a Japanese manga series written and illustrated by Yuki Otake. It began serialization in Shogakukan's Big Comic Superior magazine in December 2009.

== Synopsis ==
Yukari Ogata, a female photographer, goes to cover Tokyo Crusade, which has a strange recruitment ad that reads, "Looking for players with beautiful legs!!" There she meets a boy named Chihiro Oki, who has an incredible talent for soccer. Tokyo Crusade's coach Mikiyasu Takahashi, declares that he is serious about winning the Emperor's Cup, and Oki, who has a complicated past, find common ground, and the two begin their journey towards the Emperor's Cup finals.

== Publication ==
Written and illustrated by Yuki Otake, Football Nation began serialization in Shogakukan's Big Comic Superior magazine on December 11, 2009. The series went on hiatus on August 28, 2020, due to Otake's recovery from breast cancer surgery. It resumed serialization on July 9, 2021. Its chapters have been compiled into twenty tankōbon volumes as of December 2025.

In July 2016, the series had an illustration collaboration with fellow soccer manga series Aoashi and Be Blues! which are also published by Shogakukan in the magazines Big Comic Spirits and Weekly Shōnen Sunday respectively.

=== Volumes ===
No.	Release date	ISBN
1	May 28, 2010	978-4-09-183167-5
2	August 30, 2011	978-4-09-184040-0
3	February 29, 2012	978-4-09-184279-4
4	October 30, 2012	978-4-09-184749-2
5	September 30, 2013	978-4-09-185419-3
6	May 30, 2014	978-4-09-186210-5
7	February 27, 2015	978-4-09-186793-3
8	October 30, 2015	978-4-09-187316-3
9	July 29, 2016	978-4-09-187720-8
10	February 28, 2017	978-4-09-189381-9
11	October 30, 2017	978-4-09-189728-2
12	June 12, 2018	978-4-09-189894-4
13	February 28, 2019	978-4-09-860231-5
14	October 30, 2019	978-4-09-860450-0
15	June 30, 2020	978-4-09-860644-3
16	November 30, 2021	978-4-09-861193-5
17	November 30, 2022	978-4-09-861475-2
18	November 30, 2023	978-4-09-862602-1
19	December 26, 2024	978-4-09-863088-2
20	December 26, 2025	978-4-09-863663-1

== Reception ==
The series had over 2 million copies in circulation by December 2024.

The series has been recommended by Japanese footballers like Hideto Takahashi, Kengo Nakamura, Yasuyuki Konno, Wataru Endō, Daisuke Matsui, Kento Hashimoto, Shinji Okazaki, and Shūichi Gonda.
