= Sprite (manga) =

Japanese manga series

- First tankōbon volume cover

スプライト (Supuraito)
- Genre: Action, science fiction
- Manga
- Written by: Yūgo Ishikawa
- Published by: Shogakukan
- Magazine: Big Comic Superior
- Original run: April 24, 2009 – April 10, 2015
- Volumes: 15
- icon

Sprite (スプライト, Supuraito) is a Japanese manga series written and illustrated by Yūgo Ishikawa. It was serialized in Shogakukan's seinen manga magazine Big Comic Superior from April 2009 to April 2015, with its chapters collected in fifteen tankōbon volumes.

== Plot ==
Yoshiko and her friends are visiting her shut-in uncle when a strong earthquake suddenly erupts. As the tremors subside, however, they come to realize that the world has mysteriously changed. As they wait for rescue, horrifying apparitions begin to haunt them and test their sanity.

== Publication ==
Written and illustrated by Yūgo Ishikawa, Sprite was serialized in Shogakukan's seinen manga magazine Big Comic Superior from April 24, 2009, to April 10, 2015. Shogakukan collected its chapters in fifteen tankōbon volumes, released from February 27, 2010, to May 29, 2015.

=== Volumes ===
No.	Japanese release date	Japanese ISBN
1	February 27, 2010	978-4-09-183057-9
2	June 30, 2010	978-4-09-183058-6
3	October 29, 2010	978-4-09-183209-2
4	March 30, 2011	978-4-09-183508-6
5	October 28, 2011	978-4-09-183719-6
6	November 30, 2011	978-4-09-184128-5
7	April 27, 2012	978-4-09-184179-7
8	June 8, 2012	978-4-09-184448-4
9	September 28, 2012	978-4-09-184670-9
10	March 29, 2013	978-4-09-185133-8
11	July 30, 2013	978-4-09-185378-3
12	January 30, 2014	978-4-09-185854-2
13	July 30, 2014	978-4-09-186345-4
14	December 26, 2014	978-4-09-186697-4
15	May 29, 2015	978-4-09-187027-8
