= Nihon Ad Systems =

Japanese animation company

Nihon Ad Systems Inc.
- Native name: 株式会社日本アドシステムズ
- Romanized name: Kabushiki-gaisha Nihon Ado Shisutemuzu
- Type: Kabushiki gaisha
- Industry: Animation planning and production, copyright management, international distribution
- Founded: October 1, 1975; 51 years ago
- Headquarters: Toranomon Hills, Toranomon, Minato, Tokyo, Japan
- Key people: Shuji Wada (president)
- Parent: ADK Emotions
- Website: https://www.nasinc.co.jp/en/company/

Nihon Ad Systems Inc. (Japanese: 株式会社日本アドシステムズ, Hepburn: Kabushiki-gaisha Nihon Ado Shisutemuzu; NAS), is a Japanese anime production and character merchandising company, a wholly owned subsidiary of the advertising agency Asatsu-DK. The "Ad" in its title is an abbreviation for "Animation Development". Along with Sony Pictures Entertainment Japan, Sunrise, Toei Animation and TMS Entertainment, it is a co-founder and shareholder of the Japanese anime television network Animax. It has its headquarters in Toranomon Hills, Minato, Tokyo.

== List of productions ==
=== TV series ===
- Chikkun Takkun
- High School! Kimengumi
- Tsuide ni Tonchinkan
- Dragon Quest
- Genji Tsūshin Agedama
- Hime-chan's Ribbon
- Akazukin Chacha
- Captain Tsubasa J
- Dino Adventure Jurassic Tripper
- Ai Tenshi Densetsu Wedding Peach
- Nurse Angel Ririka SOS
- Neon Genesis Evangelion
- Mizuiro Jidai
- Kodomo no Omocha
- Kero Kero Chime
- Beast Wars II: Super Life-Form Transformers
- Super Life-Form Transformers: Beast Wars Neo
- Hatsumei Boy Kanipan
- Cho Hatsumei Boy Kanipan
- Maso Kishin Cybuster
- Medarot
- Bikkuriman 2000
- Kyoro-chan
- Transformers: Car Robots
- Yu-Gi-Oh! Duel Monsters
- Medarot Damashii
- The Powerpuff Girls (TV Tokyo version)
- Fruits Basket
- Ask Dr. Rin!
- Shaman King
- Dennō Bōkenki Webdiver
- The Prince of Tennis
- Forza! Hidemaru
- Bakuto Sengen Daigunder
- Rockman.EXE
- Full Moon o Sagashite
- Bomberman Jetters
- Shin Megami Tensei: D-Children - Light & Dark
- Dragon Drive
- Super Robot Life-Form Transformers: Legend of the Microns
- Boken Yuki Pluster World
- Tank Knights Portriss (co-production)
- Transformers: Superlink
- Sgt. Frog
- Get Ride! Amdriver
- Onmyō Taisenki
- Kappa no Kaikata
- Yu-Gi-Oh! Duel Monsters GX
- Eyeshield 21
- Twin Princess of Wonder Planet
- Ginga Legend Weed
- Kotencotenco
- Humanoid Monster Bem
- Twin Princess of Wonder Planet Gyu!
- Kōtetsu Sangokushi
- Kamichama Karin
- Zombie-Loan
- Dragonaut: The Resonance
- Yu-Gi-Oh! 5D's
- Vampire Knight
- Natsume's Book of Friends
- Natsume's Book of Friends Continued
- Mainichi Kaasan
- Pretty Rhythm: Aurora Dream
- Yu-Gi-Oh! Zexal
- Natsume's Book of Friends Three
- Kimi to Boku.
- New Prince of Tennis
- Natsume's Book of Friends Four
- Kuroko no Basuke
- Sengoku Collection
- Ginga e Kickoff!!
- Chōyaku Hyakunin isshu: Uta Koi
- My Little Monster
- Yu-Gi-Oh! Zexal II
- Day Break Illusion
- Yu-Gi-Oh! Arc-V
- Bakumatsu Rock
- Akame ga Kill!
- Gugure! Kokkuri-san
- Sengoku Musou
- Blood Blockade Battlefront
- Rokka no Yuusha
- Kamisama Minarai: Himitsu no Cocotama
- Hacka Doll The Animation
- Dance with Devils
- Cheer Boys!!
- Matoi the Sacred Slayer
- Natsume's Book of Friends Five
- Nanbaka
- ACCA: 13-Territory Inspection Dept.
- Anonymous Noise
- Yu-Gi-Oh! VRAINS
- Natsume's Book of Friends Six
- Aho-Girl
- Tsuredure Children
- Ore-tacha Yokai Ningen
- School Babysitters
- Hinomaru Sumo
- Magical Sempai
- Are You Lost?
- True Cooking Master Boy
- In/Spectre

=== Films ===
- Battle Fighters Garou Densetsu (TV film)
- Kochira Katsushika-ku Kameari Kōen-mae Hashutsujo: The Movie
- Kochira Katsushika-ku Kameari Kōen-mae Hashutsujo: The Movie 2: UFO Shūrai! Tornado Daisakusen!!
- Yu-Gi-Oh! Duel Monsters: Pyramid of Light
- Keroro Gunsō the Super Movie
- Chō Gekijōban Keroro Gunsō 2: Shinkai no Princess de Arimasu!
- Forest of Piano
- Keroro Gunso the Super Movie 3: Keroro vs. Keroro Great Sky Duel
- Yu-Gi-Oh! The Movie: Super Fusion! Bonds That Transcend Time
- Yu-Gi-Oh!: The Dark Side of Dimensions
- Wakaokami wa Shogakusei!

=== Web series ===
- Penguin Musume
- 7 Seeds
- Kengan Ashura
