= Yoiko =

Japanese manga series

- First tankōbon volume cover

よいこ
- Genre: Comedy
- Manga
- Written by: Yūgo Ishikawa
- Published by: Shogakukan
- Magazine: Weekly Big Comic Spirits
- Original run: 1996 – 2001
- Volumes: 15
- Anime television series
- Directed by: Takahiro Omori
- Written by: Sukehiro Tomita
- Music by: Yoshio J. Maki
- Studio: Studio Pierrot
- Original network: TBS
- Original run: November 6, 1998 – March 26, 1999
- Episodes: 20
- icon

Yoiko (よいこ; lit. 'Good Girl') is a Japanese manga series written and illustrated by Yūgo Ishikawa. It was serialized in Shogakukan's seinen manga magazine Weekly Big Comic Spirits from 1996 to 2001, with its chapters collected in 15 tankōbon volumes. A 20-episode anime television series animated by Studio Pierrot was broadcast in Japan on TBS from November 1998 to March 1999.

== Plot ==
Fūka Esumi has a full-grown body, standing tall at 163 cm (64 in). Despite her appearance, Fūka is otherwise an ordinary elementary school girl. When she moves in with her relatives and enrolls in the local school, her body draws the attention of teachers and students. Totally unaware of this, with a mentality of her own age, Fūka tries to get by her school life just like her classmates. However, due to the contrast between her appearance and mind, her actions end up causing misunderstandings and troubles among people around her.

== Characters ==
Fūka Esumi (江角 風花, Esumi Fūka)
Voiced by: Ryōko Nagata
Miki Kashima (鹿島 ミキ, Kashima Miki)
Voiced by: Sawa Ono
Jirō (ジロー)
Voiced by: Nobuyuki Hiyama
Miss Noguchi (野口 先生, Noguchi-sensei)
Voiced by: Miki Yoshino
Akira Ozeki (小関 アキラ, Ozeki Akira)
Voiced by: Mifuyu Hiiragi
Kenji Amimoto (網本 ケンジ, Amimoto Kenji)
Voiced by: Daisuke Sakaguchi

== Media ==
=== Manga ===
Written and illustrated by Yūgo Ishikawa, Yoiko was serialized in Shogakukan's seinen manga magazine Weekly Big Comic Spirits from 1996 to 2001. Initially, it was planned as a short series, and Shogakukan collected its chapters in two volumes and released them under the Big Spirits Comics Special imprint in May 1997 and January 1998; however, after the series began a regular weekly serialization in the magazine, lasting longer than planned, this edition was discontinued. Shogakukan released 15 tankōbon volumes, from June 30, 1998, to May 30, 2001.

=== Anime ===
A 20-episode anime television series adaptation, animated by Studio Pierrot, was broadcast in Japan on TBS from November 7, 1998, to March 27, 1999.

== Reception ==
John Oppliger of AnimeNation called the series a "Golden Boy style ribald comedy". Oppliger also identified it as one of the earliest true fan service anime television series, noting, however, that its depictions of nudity and sexual humor were "innocent and humorous" and circumstantial in nature, contrasting them with the more provocative fan service commonly found in later anime titles.
