= Puniru Is a Kawaii Slime =

Japanese manga series

- First tankōbon volume cover

ぷにるはかわいいスライム (Puniru wa Kawaii Suraimu)
- Genre: Romantic comedy
- Manga

Cute Puniru Slime
- Written by: Maedakun
- Published by: Shogakukan
- English publisher: NA: Seven Seas Entertainment (Note: The one-shot is additionally featured in Volume 1)
- Magazine: Bessatsu CoroCoro Comic
- Published: February 28, 2019
- Manga
- Written by: Maedakun
- Published by: Shogakukan
- English publisher: NA: Seven Seas Entertainment
- Magazine: Weekly CoroCoro Comic
- Original run: March 13, 2022 – present
- Volumes: 11
- Anime television series

Puniru Is a Kawaii Slime
- Directed by: Yūshi Ibe
- Produced by: Mirei Tsumura; Yuzuru Saitou; Reiko Sasaki; Yuukou Itou
- Written by: Michiko Yokote
- Music by: Izumi Mori
- Studio: Toho Animation Studio
- Licensed by: Crunchyroll (streaming) Netflix (streaming); SA/SEA: Medialink
- Original network: TXN (TV Tokyo)
- Original run: October 6, 2024 – September 21, 2025
- Episodes: 24
- icon

Puniru Is a Kawaii Slime (Japanese: ぷにるはかわいいスライム, Hepburn: Puniru wa Kawaii Suraimu; 'Puniru Is a Cute Slime') is a Japanese manga series written and illustrated by Maedakun. Preceded by a one-shot published in Shogakukan's children's manga magazine Bessatsu CoroCoro Comic in February 2019, the manga started its serialization in Weekly CoroCoro Comic online service in March 2022. Shogakukan has collected its chapters in eleven tankōbon volumes as of July 2026. The series focuses on the titular character Puniru, a slime girl created by a boy named Kotaro Kawaii during his childhood who wants him to notice her for her cuteness, despite him being in love with a girl in the grade above him.

An anime television series adaptation produced by Toho Animation Studio aired from October to December 2024, with a second season aired from July to September 2025.

The manga won the 70th Shogakukan Manga Award in 2025.

== Plot ==
A young boy named Kotaro Kawaii made a slime as part of a science experiment which came to life. The slime, named Puniru, initially resembled a penguin. Seven years later, Kotaro is now in his second year of junior high and is having a hard time admitting his feelings for third-year girl Mami Kirara. In that time, Puniru gained a new ability to morph herself into a human girl to have her creator notice her cuteness again.

== Characters ==
Puniru (ぷにる)
Voiced by: Yū Sasahara
A slime girl created by Kotaro when he was in elementary school.
Kotaro Kawaii (河合井 コタロー, Kawaii Kotarō)
Voiced by: Shūichirō Umeda
An 8th-grade boy who is Puniru's creator.
Mami Kirara (雲母 麻美, Kirara Mami)
Voiced by: Risa Shimizu
A 9th-grade student who Kotaro has a crush on.
Yūsuke Nanpa (南波 遊助, Nanpa Yūsuke)
Voiced by: Junya Enoki
A classmate of Kotaro's who has a passion for kids' toys.
Alice Okanega (御金賀 アリス, Okanega Arisu)
Voiced by: Yumiri Hanamori
A girl in Kotaro's class who is also the creator of Runerune.
Hiroshi Mado (真戸 博士, Mado Hiroshi)
Voiced by: Kazuya Nakai

== Media ==
=== Manga ===
Written and illustrated by Maedakun, a first one-shot, titled "Cute Puniru Slime" (かわいいぷにるはスライム, Kawaī Puniru wa Suraimu), was published in Shogakukan's children's manga Bessatsu CoroCoro Comic on February 28, 2019. Puniru Is a Kawaii Slime started its serialization in Weekly CoroCoro Comic online service on March 15, 2022. Shogakukan has collected its chapters into individual tankōbon volumes. The first volume was released on July 28, 2022. As of July 2026, eleven volumes have been released.

In October 2025, Seven Seas Entertainment announced that they had licensed the series for English publication in a 2-in-1 omnibus release. The first omnibus volume is set to be released in August 2026.

==== Volumes ====
No.	Original release date	Original ISBN	English release date	English ISBN
1	July 28, 2022	978-4-09-143537-8; 978-4-09-943115-0 (SE)	August 18, 2026	979-8-89765-930-2
Chapters 1-9; Cute Puniru Slime
2	November 28, 2022	978-4-09-143553-8; 978-4-09-943121-1 (SE)	August 18, 2026	979-8-89765-930-2
Chapters 10-19; Extra Chapters 1-3
3	February 28, 2023	978-4-09-143578-1; 978-4-09-943126-6 (SE)	November 17, 2026	979-8897659319
Chapters 20-28; Extra Chapters 4-6
4	August 9, 2023	978-4-09-143610-8; 978-4-09-943131-0 (SE)	November 17, 2026	979-8897659319
Chapters 29-36
5	January 26, 2024	978-4-09-143670-2; 978-4-09-943145-7 (SE)	March 9, 2027	979-8-89765-932-6
Chapters 37-44; Extra Chapter 7-9
6	September 27, 2024	978-4-09-149785-7; 978-4-09-943168-6 (SE)	March 9, 2027	979-8-89765-932-6
Chapters 45-52; Extra Chapter 10
7	February 27, 2025	978-4-09-154017-1; 978-4-09-943193-8 (SE)	—	—
Chapters 53-60; Extra Chapter 11
8	July 28, 2025	978-4-09-154027-0; 978-4-09-943206-5 (SE)	—	—
Chapters 61-70; Extra Chapters 12-13
9	August 28, 2025	978-4-09-154057-7; 978-4-09-943207-2 (SE)	—	—
Chapters 71-77; Extra Chapters 14-19
10	January 28, 2026	978-4-09-154105-5; 978-4-09-943225-6 (SE)	—	—
Chapters 78-86; Extra Chapters 20-31
11	July 28, 2026	978-4-09-154299-1	-	—
Chapters 87-94.5; Extra Chapters 32-39

==== Chapters that are currently not in tankōbon format ====
- Chapters 95-104
- Extra Chapters 40-42

=== Anime ===
An anime television series adaptation was announced on December 13, 2023. It is produced by Toho Animation Studio and directed by Yūshi Ibe, with series composition by Michiko Yokote, Aya Tanaka providing the character designs and Izumi Mori composing the music. The series aired from October 6 to December 23, 2024, on TV Tokyo and its affiliates. The opening theme song is "Gyumu!" (ぎゅむ！), while the ending theme song is "Show" (唱, Shō; lit. "chant"), both performed by Yū Sasahara, with the latter being a cover of Ado's song of the same name.

Following the final episode of the series, a second season was announced, which premiered on July 6, 2025. Yū Sasahara performed the second season's opening and ending themes: "Brun-Brun" and "Ao To Natsu" (青と夏; "Summer and Blues"), the ending being a cover of Mrs. Green Apple's 2018 single of the same name.

Crunchyroll and Netflix both stream the series under the title Puniru is a Kawaii Slime. Medialink licensed the series in Asia-Pacific (except Australia and New Zealand) for streaming on Ani-One Asia's YouTube channel.

==== Series Overview ====
Season	Episodes	Originally released	
Season	Episodes	First released	Last released
1	12	October 6, 2024	December 22, 2024
2	12	July 6, 2025	September 21, 2025

==== Episodes ====
===== Season 1 (2024) =====
No. overall	No. in season	Title	Directed by	Written by	Storyboarded by	Chief animation directed by	Original release date
1	1	"I HATE YOU and I LOVE YOU"	Yūshi Ibe	Michiko Yokote	Yūshi Ibe	Aya Tanaka & Kenji Matsuoka	October 6, 2024
2	2	"Neither Friend nor Slime"; Transliteration: "Tomodachi de mo Naku Suraimu de mo Naku" (Japanese: 友達でもなくスライムでもなく)	Tetsuya Miyanishi	Miharu Hirami	Tetsuya Miyanishi	Kenji Matsuoka	October 13, 2024
3	3	"Kawaii Puniru is a Slime"; Transliteration: "Kawaī Puniru wa Suraimu" (Japanese: かわいいぷにるはスライム)	Minami Honma	Michiko Yokote	Shinichi Watanabe	Aya Tanaka	October 20, 2024
4	4	"Alice in Kyuthi Land"; Transliteration: "Kyuti Rando no Arisu" (Japanese: かわいい国(キュティランド)のアリス)	Mayo Nozaki	Michiko Yokote	Mayo Nozaki	Kenji Matsuoka	October 27, 2024
5	5	"GO! GO! Fabulous Cheer Routine!"; Transliteration: "GO! GO! Karei ni Oendesu!" (Japanese: GO!GO!華麗に応援です！)	Ryōta Karasawa	Miharu Hirami	Yūshi Ibe	Kenji Matsuoka	November 3, 2024
6	6	"The Runrune-tastic Grand Prix, Now with Puniru!"; Transliteration: "Darake no Guranpuri Puniru Moaru yo!" (Japanese: ルンルーンだらけのGP(グランプリ)グランプリぷにるもあるよ！)	Mitsuyo Yokono	Michiko Yokote	Shinichi Watanabe	Aya Tanaka	November 10, 2024
7	7	"Sweet Bitter Summer"	China	Rintarou Ikeda	China & Itsuki Tsuchigami	Aya Tanaka	November 17, 2024
8	8	"Gather 'Round for the School Festival!"; Transliteration: "Bunkamatsuri Desu! Zen'in Shūgō" (Japanese: 文化祭です！全員集合)	Tetsuya Miyanishi	Miharu Hirami	Tetsuya Miyanishi	Kenji Matsuoka	November 24, 2024
9	9	"Let's Start a Band, Punks!"; Transliteration: "Bando Yarō ZE!" (Japanese: バンド野郎ZE!)	Yūshi Ibe	Rintarou Ikeda	Yūshi Ibe	Aya Tanaka	December 1, 2024
10	10	"Merry Punirumas!"; Transliteration: "Merī Punirumasu!" (Japanese: メリーぷにるます！)	Minami Honma	Michiko Yokote	Minami Honma	Kenji Matsuoka	December 8, 2024
11	11	"Scoop Up a Spoonful of Christmas"; Transliteration: "Supūn Ichihai no Kurisumasu o Sukutte" (Japanese: スプーン一杯のクリスマスをすくって)	Mayo Nozaki	Michiko Yokote	Mayo Nozaki	Aya Tanaka	December 16, 2024 (Note: This episode aired at 12:15 a.m. JST, 30 minutes after the original air time on TV Tokyo.)
12	12	"A Lovely, Puniful Destination"; Transliteration: "Ī Tabi Puni Kibun" (Japanese: いい旅ぷに気分)	Ryōta Karasawa	Michiko Yokote	Yusuke Kubo	Kenji Matsuoka	December 23, 2024 (Note: This episode aired at 12:25 a.m. JST, 40 minutes after the original air time on TV Tokyo.)

===== Season 2 (2025) =====
No. overall	No. in season	Title	Directed by	Written by	Storyboarded by	Chief animation directed by	Original release date
13	1	"Puniru Returns"; Transliteration: "Puniru Ritānzu" (Japanese: ぷにるリターンズ)	Yūshi Ibe	Michiko Yokote	Yūshi Ibe	Aya Tanaka	July 6, 2025
14	2	"Going on a Journey with My Childhood Friend Slime in Another World. And Valentine's, Too!"; Transliteration: "Isekai de Osananajimi no Suraimu to Tabi Shita Kudan. Barentain mo Aru yo!" (Japanese: 異世界で幼馴染のスライムと旅した件。 バレンタインもあるよ！)	Natsumi Higashida	Rintarou Ikeda	Natsumi Higashida	Kenji Matsuoka	July 13, 2025
15	3	"RUNE RUNE DANCE"	Kazunobu Fuseki	Miharu Hirami	Minami Honma	Aya Tanaka & Kenji Matsuoka	July 20, 2025
16	4	"A Being More Perfect than a Toy"; Transliteration: "Hobī Yori mo Pāfekutona Sonzai" (Japanese: ホビーよりもパーフェクトな存在)	Yūichi Satō	Yūshi Ibe	Yūshi Ibe	Aya Tanaka	July 27, 2025
17	5	"Puniru Powers Up?! See It for Yourself!"; Transliteration: "Puniru pawāappu! ? Kimi no me de tashikamero!" (Japanese: ぷにるパワーアップ!? 君の目で確かめろ！)	Yuki Morita & Yuki Tobita	Rintarō Ikeda	Ryōta Karasawa	Kenji Matsuoka	August 3, 2025
18	6	"A Human Happy Ending"; Transliteration: "Ningen no Happīendo" (Japanese: 人間のハッピーエンド)	Mayo Nozaki	Miharu Hirami	Mayo Nozaki	Aya Tanaka	August 10, 2025
19	7	"A Midsummer's Runrune Resort"; Transliteration: "Manatsu no Runrūnrizōto" (Japanese: 真夏のルンルーンリゾート)	Kento Nakagome	Rintarō Ikeda	Kento Nakagome	Kenji Matsuoka	August 17, 2025
20	8	"Trick or Kawaii!"; Transliteration: "Torikku oa Kawaī!" (Japanese: トリック オア かわいい！)	Natsumi Higashida	Michiko Yokote	Natsumi Higashida	Kenji Matsuoka	August 24, 2025
21	9	"Art is All About"; Transliteration: "Geijutsu wa 'Kawaī' Desu!" (Japanese: 芸術は「かわいい」です！)	Ayako Sugi	Miharu Hirami	Minami Honma	Aya Tanaka	August 31, 2025
22	10	"Friendly Enough to Always Argue"; Transliteration: "Kenkasuruhodo Nakagaī" (Japanese: ケンカするほど仲がいい)	Manaka Makoto	Michiko Yokote	Tetsuya Watanabe	Kenji Matsuoka	September 7, 2025
23	11	"The Human Condition"; Transliteration: "Ningen no Jōken" (Japanese: 人間の条件)	Mayo Nozaki	Michiko Yokote	Mayo Nozaki	Aya Tanaka	September 14, 2025
24	12	"That's What the World Calls Love"; Transliteration: "Sekai wa Sore o Ai to Yoban De Ze" (Japanese: 世界はそれを愛と呼ぶんだぜ)	Natsumi Mamada	Michiko Yokote	Natsumi Mamada	Aya Tanaka & Kenji Matsuoka	September 21, 2025

== Reception ==
The manga placed fourth in Next Manga Awards's Web category in 2022. Along with Burning Kabaddi, Draw This, Then Die!, and Natsume Arata no Kekkon, Puniru Is a Cute Slime won the 70th Shogakukan Manga Award in 2024.

The manga was viewed more than 600,000 times on its online website by March 2022; it rose to more than 3.5 million views by May of that same year, and 7 million by July of that same year. The first tankōbon volume had a first-print run of 100,000 copies.
