= Kappa no Kaikata =

Japanese manga series

- Manga volume 1 cover

カッパの飼い方
- Genre: Fantasy comedy
- Manga
- Written by: Yūgo Ishikawa
- Published by: Shueisha
- Imprint: Young Jump Comics
- Magazine: Weekly Young Jump
- Original run: February 6, 2003 – July 15, 2010
- Volumes: 15
- Anime television series
- Directed by: Nagisa Miyazaki
- Produced by: Tatsuji Yamazaki; Takashi Nakanishi
- Written by: Nagisa Miyazaki
- Music by: Masaki Tsurugi
- Studio: Picture Magic
- Original network: Animax
- Original run: October 4, 2004 – April 4, 2005
- Episodes: 26

Kappa no Kaikata (カッパの飼い方; lit. 'How to Breed Kappa') is a Japanese manga series written and illustrated by Yūgo Ishikawa. It was serialized in Shueisha's seinen manga magazine Weekly Young Jump from 2003 to 2010, with its chapters collected in 15 tankōbon volumes. An anime television series adaptation, consisting of 26 episodes of three minutes each, produced by NAS and animated by Picture Magic, was broadcast on Animax from 2004 to 2005.

== Story ==
A young man named Watashi (私; lit. "I" or "Me"), upon passing by a pet shop on his way home, happens upon a water Kappa in the window, which he buys, names Kaatan (かぁたん), and is determined to raise as a pet. Never having owned a kappa before, he relies on a book that specializes in information on how to raise and train kappa. However, Kaatan is harder to train than it immediately seems, and a lot of patience is exerted by Watashi in his effort.

== Characters ==
Watashi (私)
Voiced by: Masato Hagiwara
Kaatan (かぁたん)
Voiced by: Chiro Kanzaki
Ms. Sakamoto (坂本さん, Sakamoto-san)
Voiced by: Nao Yamauchi
Ms. Tamada (玉田さん, Tamada-san)
Voiced by: Junko Takeuchi
Mr. Tadokoro (玉田さん, Tadokoro-san)
Voiced by: Eiji Takemoto
Hercules (ヘラクレス, Herakuresu)
Voiced by: Yoshihiro Takayama

== Media ==
=== Manga ===
Written and illustrated by Yūgo Ishikawa, Kappa no Kaikata was serialized in Shueisha's seinen manga magazine Weekly Young Jump from February 6, 2003, to July 15, 2010. Shueisha collected its chapters in 15 tankōbon volumes, released from October 17, 2003, to October 19, 2010.

==== Volumes ====
No.	Release date	ISBN
01	October 17, 2003	978-4-08-876514-3
02	March 19, 2004	978-4-08-876582-2
03	August 19, 2004	978-4-08-876660-7
04	March 18, 2005	978-4-08-876770-3
05	August 18, 2005	978-4-08-876840-3
06	February 17, 2006	978-4-08-877038-3
07	July 19, 2006	978-4-08-877112-0
08	January 19, 2007	978-4-08-877201-1
09	July 19, 2007	978-4-08-877294-3
10	January 18, 2008	978-4-08-877375-9
11	August 19, 2008	978-4-08-877491-6
12	February 19, 2009	978-4-08-877594-4
13	September 18, 2009	978-4-08-877724-5
14	March 19, 2010	978-4-08-877809-9
15	October 19, 2010	978-4-08-879039-8

=== Anime ===
An anime television series adaptation, consisting of 26 episodes of three minutes each, produced by NAS and animated by Picture Magic, was broadcast on Animax from October 4, 2004, to April 4, 2005.
