= Burning Kabaddi =

Japanese manga series

- Cover of Burning Kabaddi volume 1 by Shogakukan

灼熱カバディ (Shakunetsu Kabadi)
- Genre: Sports (Kabaddi)
- Manga
- Written by: Hajime Musashino
- Published by: Shogakukan
- Magazine: Ura Sunday; MangaONE
- Original run: July 2, 2015 – July 23, 2024
- Volumes: 31
- Anime television series
- Directed by: Kazuya Ichikawa
- Written by: Yūko Kakihara
- Music by: Ken Ito
- Studio: TMS Entertainment
- Licensed by: Crunchyroll; SA/SEA: Medialink
- Original network: TV Tokyo, TV Osaka, TV Aichi, AT-X
- Original run: April 3, 2021 – June 19, 2021
- Episodes: 12
- icon

Burning Kabaddi (Japanese: 灼熱カバディ, Hepburn: Shakunetsu Kabadi) is a Japanese kabaddi manga series written and illustrated by Hajime Musashino. It was serialized on Shogakukan's Ura Sunday website and MangaONE app from July 2015 to July 2024 and has been collected in thirty-one tankōbon volumes. An anime television series adaptation by TMS Entertainment aired from April to June 2021.

Burning Kabaddi won the 70th Shogakukan Manga Award in 2025.

== Characters ==
=== Nōkin High School ===
Tatsuya Yoigoshi (宵越 竜哉, Yoigoshi Tatsuya)
Voiced by: Yuma Uchida
A former soccer player who quit due to his teammates talking behind his back out of jealousy. He was reluctant to join the Kabaddi, but he learned to enjoy it overtime. He has a naturally athletic build, and a gift for speed. Before joining the Kabaddi club, he was a live streamer under the name "Night's End".
Masato Ojo (王城 正人, Ōjō Masato)
Voiced by: Nobuhiko Okamoto
Sōma Azemichi (畦道 相馬, Azemichi Sōma)
Voiced by: Gen Satō
The one who brought Yoigoshi to the Kabaddi club fue to requests from his upperclassmen. Although he is short, he is very strong due living in the mountains and helping his families business as potters. He is the only one in the club with a girlfriend.
Kei Iura (井浦 慶, Iura Kei)
Voiced by: Makoto Furukawa
Kyōhei Misumi (水澄 京平, Misumi Kyōhei)
Voiced by: Tatsuhisa Suzuki
Shinji Date (伊達 真司, Date Shinji)
Voiced by: Shunsuke Takeuchi
Nobutaka Ban (伴 伸賢, Ban Nobutaka)
Voiced by: Shin'ichirō Kamio
Ryuta Seki (関 隆太, Seki Ryūta)
Voiced by: Wataru Komada
Yūki Hitomi (人見 祐希, Hitomi Yūki)
Voiced by: Ayumu Murase

=== Souwa High School ===
Ayumu Rokugen (六弦 歩, Rokugen Ayumu)
Voiced by: Hiroki Yasumoto
Ren Takaya (高谷 煉, Takaya Ren)
Voiced by: Kenichi Suzumura
Shintarō Kizaki (木崎 新太郎, Kizaku Shintarō)
Voiced by: Taku Yashiro
Yū Eikura (栄倉 祐, Eikura Yū)
Voiced by: Osamu Uchida
Daisuke Muroya (室屋 大助, Muroya Daisuke)
Voiced by: Junichi Yanagita

=== Saitama Kōyō High School ===
Manabu Sakura (佐倉 学, Sakura Manabu)
Voiced by: Natsuki Hanae
Hiromoto Utou (右藤 大元, Utō Hiromoto)
Voiced by: Soma Saito

== Media ==
=== Manga ===
Burning Kabaddi is a manga series written and illustrated by Hajime Musashino. The series began serialization on Shogakukan's Ura Sunday website and MangaONE app in July 2015. In May 2024, it was announced that the series had reached its climax. The series published its final chapter on July 23, 2024. Shogakukan has collected its chapters into individual tankōbon volumes. As of November 12, 2024, thirty volumes have been published.

No.	Japanese release date	Japanese ISBN
1	February 12, 2016	978-4-09-127027-6
2	May 12, 2016	978-4-09-127257-7
3	October 12, 2016	978-4-09-127446-5
4	February 17, 2017	978-4-09-127530-1
5	July 12, 2017	978-4-09-127719-0
6	September 19, 2017	978-4-09-127815-9
7	January 12, 2018	978-4-09-128119-7
8	May 18, 2018	978-4-09-128297-2
9	August 17, 2018	978-4-09-128464-8
10	November 12, 2018	978-4-09-128719-9
11	April 19, 2019	978-4-09-129107-3
12	September 9, 2019	978-4-09-129395-4
13	February 12, 2020	978-4-09-129584-2
14	July 10, 2020	978-4-09-850196-0
15	October 12, 2020	978-4-09-850291-2
16	March 18, 2021	978-4-09-850480-0
17	April 12, 2021	978-4-09-850499-2
18	May 12, 2021	978-4-09-850568-5
19	July 12, 2021	978-4-09-850619-4
20	December 17, 2021	978-4-09-850837-2
21	April 19, 2022	978-4-09-851079-5
22	August 10, 2022	978-4-09-851229-4
23	December 12, 2022	978-4-09-851444-1
24	April 18, 2023	978-4-09-852010-7
25	August 9, 2023	978-4-09-852667-3
26	December 12, 2023	978-4-09-853054-0
27	April 11, 2024	978-4-09-853201-8
28	July 11, 2024	978-4-09-853437-1
29	October 10, 2024	978-4-09-853644-3
30	November 12, 2024	978-4-09-853696-2
31	December 19, 2024	978-4-09-853750-1

=== Anime ===
An anime television series adaptation was announced on July 6, 2020. Produced by TMS Entertainment, the series is directed by Kazuya Ichikawa and written by Yūko Kakihara. Mari Takada is designing the characters and Ken Ito is composing the series' music. Domerica is credited with animation cooperation. The opening theme, "Fire Bird", is performed by Shunya Ōhira, while the ending theme, "Comin' Back", is performed by Yuma Uchida. The series aired from April 3 to June 19, 2021, on TV Tokyo, TV Osaka, TV Aichi, and AT-X. Crunchyroll streamed the series outside of Asia. Medialink has licensed the series in Southeast Asia, and is streaming it on their partnered platforms.

No.	Title	Directed by (Note: Information is taken from the ending credits of each episode.)	Written by	Original release date
1	"What is Kabaddi?"; Transliteration: "Kabaditte Nanda yo" (Japanese: カバディってなんだよ)	Miyuki Kaieda	Yūko Kakihara	April 3, 2021
Tatsuya Yoigoshi, the former ace of Junior High Soccer team, has come to dislike sports and does online live streaming instead. However, he is invited by Souma Azemichi to join the Kabaddi club. After many tries, Yoigoshi finally agrees to only see their practice. He goes to the Kabaddi Club with Souma and meets Vice Captain Kei Iura, Shinji Date, and Kyouhei Misumi. After seeing their practice match and getting amazed by kabaddi, Iura gives him an offer—if he wins a one-on-one Match against Souma, he will be allowed to go, but if he loses the match, he has to join the club. Yoigoshi accepts and after a few practice matches loses to Souma. According to the offer, he joins the club. Iura contacts the Captain Masato Oujou to tell him about the new member.
2	"Men Who Connect"; Transliteration: "Tsunagaru Otoko-tachi" (Japanese: 繋がる男たち)	Miyuki Kaieda	Yūko Kakihara	April 10, 2021
Tatsuya Yoigoshi starts practicing with the team. First, he refuses to practice in a defense formation because in this form they have to form a "chain" where they have to hold hands with each other and he does not like the idea. Instead, he preferred to practice as a raider. His raid success rate against them was zero. But after he is observing the deputy director Kei Iura, the second year students Misumi Kyohei and Date Shinji, Yoigoshi has discovered a successful way to win against them: "a raiding hat trick".
3	"Into the Burning World"; Transliteration: "Shakunetsu no Sekai e" (Japanese: 灼熱の世界へ)	Miyuki Kaieda	Yūko Kakihara	April 17, 2021
First year students Tatsuya Yoigoshi and Sōma Azemichi start practicing as a team against second year students Kyōhei Misumi and Shinji Date, unfortunately the first year students suffered during the match and defeated with a huge score. They realized that their failure happened because of the lack of coordination between both of them as team players. Yoigoshi used to hate all teamwork activities and gets irritated with all miss cooperation with Azemichi. Suddenly, Yoigoshi gets an idea, if he needs to win this match, he has to invent a method to communicate with Azemichi in order to enhance their performance; done by using specific "codes" to harmony their plays. Both start practicing secretly to get used to the codes. Meet with the second year students again in new match and gain more points.
4	"The Strongest Raider"; Transliteration: "Saikyō no Reidā" (Japanese: 最強のレイダー)	Kanako Yajima; Mana Uetake	Yūko Kakihara	April 24, 2021
Tatsuya Yoigoshi wants to know more about Kabaddi; its rules, number of players per team and more. He becomes impatient to capture the "winning" feeling in training as he thinks that the game would not be fun unless you become a winner. Vice Captain Kei Iura notices that and influences him to use his potential strength factors to become "Noukin's Beast—the strongest raider". Yoigoshi went to Shinji Date for advises to be more toned physically. One Day, while Yoigoshi was out running, he accidentally rams into a thin male that emerged suddenly without any sensed presence. This person was just released from a month stay in the hospital.
5	"The Match Begins!!!"; Transliteration: "Shiai Kaishī!!!" (Japanese: 試合開始ィ!!!)	Mana Uetake; Takuma Kaneko	Midori Gotō	May 1, 2021
6	"Chase X Counterattack"; Transliteration: "Tsuigeki×Hangeki" (Japanese: 追撃×反撃)	Miyuki Kaieda	Yūko Kakihara	May 8, 2021
7	"Struggle"	Miyuki Kaieda	Yūko Kakihara	May 15, 2021
8	"Team Applicants"; Transliteration: "Nyūbu Kibō" (Japanese: 入部希望)	Mana Uetake	Midori Gotō	May 22, 2021
9	"A Battle of Wills"; Transliteration: "Iji no Shōbu" (Japanese: 意地の勝負)	Mana Uetake; Takuma Kaneko	Midori Gotō	May 29, 2021
10	"Because He's the Ace"; Transliteration: "Ēsu da Kara" (Japanese: エースだから)	Kanako Yajima	Yūko Kakihara	June 5, 2021
11	"The Direction We're Aiming"; Transliteration: "Mezasu Hōkō" (Japanese: 目指す方向)	Mana Uetake; Kanako Yajima	Midori Gotō	June 12, 2021
12	"After Giving Every Last Drop"; Transliteration: "Subete Dashi Tsukushita Saki ni" (Japanese: 全て出し尽くした先に)	Miyuki Kaieda	Yūko Kakihara	June 19, 2021

== Reception ==
Burning Kabaddi was nominated for the 66th Shogakukan Manga Award in the shōnen category in 2020; along with Draw This, Then Die!, Natsume Arata no Kekkon, and Puniru Is a Cute Slime, Burning Kabaddi won the 70th edition in 2025.

Anime News Network had six editors review the first episode of the anime: Caitlin Moore critiqued that it contained "moderately typical sports anime beats" but felt its cast displayed "little in terms of depth or complexity" and the animation degraded as it went into the kabaddi scenes; Nicholas Dupree commended the episode for explaining the central sport's fundamentals but criticized the stiff animation and shoddy direction of the kabaddi matches, and the unlikable cast ranging from "mildly unpleasant to loudly unpleasant"; Richard Eisenbeis also praised the explanation of the sport but was unimpressed with the overall cast and humor, saying: "Frankly, despite the rather fluid animation and interesting subject matter, this is not a series I would likely choose to pick up"; James Beckett criticized the production for having weak direction in its character interactions and not displaying "fast, fluid, and impactful animation" in its kabaddi scenes; Rebecca Silverman wrote: "In all honesty, Burning Kabaddi looks like it's going to be like any other sports anime [...] It'll probably be fine, and the lure of a somewhat unusual sport may be enough of a draw for those on the fence". The sixth reviewer, Lynzee Loveridge, wrote: "I want to recommend Burning Kabaddi for its efforts to highlight a unique sport and for its particularly dumb teen protagonist, but I found nothing impressive about this premiere and much of its sports action falls flat".
