= Steel of the Celestial Shadows =

Japanese manga series

- First tankōbon volume cover

太陽と月の鋼 (Taiyō to Tsuki no Hagane)
- Genre: Period drama; Samurai; Supernatural
- Manga
- Written by: Daruma Matsuura
- Published by: Shogakukan
- English publisher: NA: Viz Media
- Magazine: Big Comic Superior
- Original run: June 12, 2020 – present
- Volumes: 10
- icon

Steel of the Celestial Shadows (Japanese: 太陽と月の鋼, Hepburn: Taiyō to Tsuki no Hagane; lit. 'The Steel of Sun and Moon') is a Japanese manga series written and illustrated by Daruma Matsuura. It has been serialized in Shogakukan's seinen manga magazine Big Comic Superior since June 2020.

== Synopsis ==
Konosuke is a samurai who, due to a curse that repels metal, cannot wield a sword. This upsets Konosuke greatly, and he ultimately decides to die. However, in a turn of events, he ends up being saved by a woman who offers him a proposal for marriage.

== Publication ==
Written and illustrated by Daruma Matsuura, Steel of the Celestial Shadows started in Shogakukan's seinen manga magazine Big Comic Superior on June 12, 2020. In March 2025, it was announced that the manga would enter an indefinite hiatus. It resumed serialization in April 2026. Shogakukan has collected its chapters into individual tankōbon volumes. The first volume was released on October 30, 2020. As of March 28, 2025, ten volumes have been released.

In June 2023, Viz Media announced that they have licensed the manga for an English release in North America. The first volume was released on January 16, 2024.

=== Volumes ===
No.	Original release date	Original ISBN	English release date	English ISBN
1	October 30, 2020	978-4-09-860750-1	January 16, 2024	978-1-9747-4274-5
2	March 30, 2021	978-4-09-860873-7	April 16, 2024	978-1-9747-4347-6
3	August 30, 2021	978-4-09-861131-7	July 16, 2024	978-1-9747-4616-3
4	April 28, 2022	978-4-09-861303-8	October 15, 2024	978-1-9747-4915-7
5	October 28, 2022	978-4-09-861457-8	January 21, 2025	978-1-9747-5139-6
6	March 30, 2023	978-4-09-861606-0	April 15, 2025	978-1-9747-5141-9
7	August 30, 2023	978-4-09-862550-5	July 15, 2025	978-1-9747-5528-8
8	February 29, 2024	978-4-09-862712-7	November 18, 2025	978-1-9747-5287-4
9	September 30, 2024	978-4-09-863038-7	February 17, 2026	978-1-9747-6165-4
10	March 28, 2025	978-4-09-863222-0	June 16, 2026	978-1-9747-6164-7

== See also ==
- Kasane, another manga series by the same author
