= Kasane, Bhiwandi =

Village in Maharashtra

Kasane
- village
- Location in Maharashtra, India Kasane (India)
- Coordinates: 19.4056763°N 73.2396761°E
- Country: India
- State: Maharashtra
- District: Thane
- Taluka: Bhiwandi
- Elevation: 32 m (105 ft)

Population (2011)
  - Total: 1,546
- Time zone: UTC+5:30 (IST)
- 2011 census code: 552616

Kasane is a village in the Thane district of Maharashtra, India. It is located in the Bhiwandi taluka. It is situated along AH47 (Mumbai-Nashik highway).

== Demographics ==
According to the 2011 census of India, Kasane has 343 households. The effective literacy rate (i.e. the literacy rate of population excluding children aged 6 and below) is 80.05%.

Demographics (2011 Census)
	Total	Male	Female
Population	1546	773	773
Children aged below 6 years	233	108	125
Scheduled caste	30	17	13
Scheduled tribe	392	193	199
Literates	1051	592	459
Workers (all)	519	442	77
Main workers (total)	432	390	42
Main workers: Cultivators	65	63	2
Main workers: Agricultural labourers	81	68	13
Main workers: Household industry workers	11	7	4
Main workers: Other	275	252	23
Marginal workers (total)	87	52	35
Marginal workers: Cultivators	8	8	0
Marginal workers: Agricultural labourers	4	2	2
Marginal workers: Household industry workers	2	0	2
Marginal workers: Others	73	42	31
Non-workers	1027	331	696
