= Fighting Beauty Wulong =

Japanese manga series

- First tankōbon volume cover

格闘美神 武龍 (Kakutō Bishin Ūron)
- Manga
- Written by: Yūgo Ishikawa
- Published by: Shogakukan
- Magazine: Weekly Young Sunday
- Original run: August 1, 2002 – May 10, 2007
- Volumes: 18 + 1 gaiden volume
- Video game
- Developer: DreamFactory
- Publisher: Bandai Namco Entertainment
- Genre: Beat 'em up
- Platform: PlayStation 2
- Released: JP: June 22, 2006
- Anime television series
- Directed by: Yoshio Suzuki
- Music by: Daisuke Ikeda
- Studio: TMS Entertainment
- Original network: TV Tokyo
- Original run: October 2, 2005 – March 26, 2006
- Episodes: 25
- Anime television series

Fighting Beauty Wulong Rebirth
- Directed by: Yoshio Suzuki
- Music by: Daisuke Ikeda
- Studio: TMS Entertainment
- Original network: TV Tokyo
- Original run: April 2, 2006 – October 1, 2006
- Episodes: 25
- icon

Fighting Beauty Wulong (Japanese: 格闘美神 武龍, Hepburn: Kakutō Bishin Ūron) is a Japanese manga series written and illustrated by Yūgo Ishikawa. It was serialized in Shogakukan's seinen manga magazine Weekly Young Sunday from August 2002 to May 2007, with its chapters collected in 18 tankōbon volumes and additional prequel gaiden volume. The series was adapted into a two-season of 25 episodes each, animated by TMS Entertainment and broadcast on TV Tokyo from October 2005 to October 2006.

== Story ==
Mao Lan, a person of Chinese origin born and raised in Japan, has been trained in the secret martial art of her family by her drunken lecherous grandfather Master Mao Hung. Her grandfather has promised her that he'll tell her what happened to her parents to encourage her to train and fight. Without her knowledge, her grandfather signs her up to participate in a televised martial arts competition between female martial artists known as "Prime Mat". During the course of the series it is revealed that Lan's mother married Cao Da Hen and gave birth to Lan's step-sister Ling-Shen.

== Characters ==
Mao Lan (Chinese: 毛蘭; pinyin: Máo Lán)
Voiced by: Wakana Yamazaki
Mao tries to act a typical teenage girl with little results. She has been trained since she could walk in Mao's family style called Mao Family Juhe Fist (毛家居合拳). The form takes characteristics from sword techniques and incorporates them into an empty-handed fighting style. From the start of both the manga and anime, Mao Lan demonstrates almost complete mastery of this form. Through flashbacks it is shown that she develops skills and abilities that only a master should be capable of.
Mao Hun (Chinese: 毛混; pinyin: Máo Hùn)
Voiced by: Takeshi Aono
Grandfather to Mao Lan and grandmaster and creator of Mao Family Juhe Fist. After moving from China with his friend and rival Cao Fusheng. He develops a style of Kenpo based on the fighting style of the samurai sword techniques. He teaches Mao Lan to fight using various odd and sometimes dangerous tests like fighting a bear or fighting a gang of thugs.
Masao Oba (大場 政夫, Ōba Masao)
Voiced by: Shūhei Sakaguchi
Bullied by boys who are stronger than him, he sees Mao Lan defeat a group of bullies and wishes to become her student. He learns to use some of the basic techniques and can defend himself from normal fighters.
Cao Fusheng (Chinese: 曹福生; pinyin: Cáo fú shēng)
Voiced by: Eiji Maruyama
Fu Shen is the true master of Cao Family Bajiquan (曹家八極拳), the rival of Mao Family Juhe Fist. In both the manga and anime he is extremely ill. He is also upset that his son Cao Da-Hen has taken the family-style kenpo and turned it into a product for money. At the start of the series, he asks Mao Hun to have Mao Lan stop his granddaughter Cao Chunyang by killing her (actually by the end you realize it is not a literal death, but by Chun Yan's defeat his style will die with him.)
Cao Da-Hen (Chinese: 曹德興; pinyin: Cáo Dé xīng; Jyutping: Cou4 Dak1 Hing1)
Voiced by: Unshō Ishizuka
Father of Chunyang and Ling-Shen. Uses his family's martial arts style for profit. Creates the Prime Mat competition to showcase Chun Yan's fighting skills to prove his family is the strongest.
Cao Ling-Shen (Chinese: 曹鈴音; pinyin: Cáo Líng yīn)
Voiced by: Risa Hayamizu
Actually Mao Lan's younger sister whose step-sister Chun Yan uses her as a sparring dummy. Rin Shen runs away from the Xao temple to learn Mao Juhe style under Lan in hopes of defeating her step sister Chun Yan one day.
Cao Chunyang (Chinese: 曹春揚; pinyin: Cáo Chūn yáng)
Voiced by: Junko Minagawa
Lan's strongest opponent. She is extremely vain and arrogant. She hates her younger step-sister to the point of almost killing her by using her as a sparring dummy. Chun Yan is secretly trained in Mao style by Gangli who was a former student of Mao Hun, so she can counter Lan's Fajing technique. She is beaten by Lan at the end of the first series, then at a train station she's talking to Lan saying she has a lot more to learn and hopes to have a rematch sometime in the future.
Yagi Megumi (八木 めぐみ, Megumi Yagi)
Voiced by: Wasabi Mizuta. Megumi is a member of the Naniwa Women's Wrestling she helps train Mao Lan in the beginning. Her fighting style combines elements of judo and professional wrestling, but later implements some of Mao's basic fighting techniques into her own style. She is then chosen to compete in the Prime Mat competition and is beaten twice once by Mao Lan then by Cao Rin Shen.
Lucky Shimoda (ラッキー 下田, Rakkī Shimoda)
Shimoda, like Megumi, is a member of the Naniwa wrestling team and is considered as their most skilled pro-wrestler, specializing in grapples and throws. When fighting in the ring, she is a flamboyant attention-seeker who has a strong tendency for humiliating her opponents during matches.

== Media ==
=== Manga ===
Written and illustrated by Yūgo Ishikawa, Fighting Beauty Wulong was serialized in Shogakukan's seinen manga magazine Weekly Young Sunday from August 1, 2002, to May 10, 2007. (Note: Finished in the magazine's 23rd issue of 2007, released on May 10 of that same year.) Shogakukan collected its chapters in 18 tankōbon volumes, with an additional prequel gaiden volume (numbered 0), from December 26, 2002, to June 5, 2007.

=== Anime ===
A 25-episode anime television series adaptation by TMS Entertainment was broadcast on TV Tokyo from October 2, 2005, to March 26, 2006. A second 25-episode season, titled Fighting Beauty Wulong Rebirth, was broadcast from April 2 to October 1, 2006.

=== Video game ===
A PlayStation 2 fighting game, developed by DreamFactory and published by Bandai, was released on June 22, 2006.
