= Kasane (manga) =

Japanese manga series

- First tankōbon volume cover

累－かさね－
- Genre: Dark fantasy, suspense
- Manga
- Written by: Daruma Matsuura
- Published by: Kodansha
- English publisher: NA: Kodansha USA (digital)
- Magazine: Evening
- Original run: April 23, 2013 – August 10, 2018
- Volumes: 14
- Live-action film
- Directed by: Yūichi Satō
- Produced by: Juichi Uehara; Fumi Hashimoto; Reiko Katayama
- Written by: Tsutomu Kuroiwa
- Music by: Yugo Kanno
- Released: September 7, 2018
- Runtime: 112 minutes
- icon

Kasane (Japanese: 累－かさね－) is a Japanese manga series written and illustrated by Daruma Matsuura. It was published in Kodansha's seinen manga magazine Evening from April 2013 to August 2018, with its chapters compiled into fourteen tankōbon volumes. A live-action film adaptation was released in September 2018. In North America, the series is licensed for English digital release by Kodansha USA.

== Characters ==
Kasane Fuchi (淵 累, Fuchi Kasane)
Portrayed by: Kyoko Yoshine
An extremely ugly girl constantly tormented by bullies, in her youth, for her appearance and the fact that her mother was an incredible beauty. Despite her appearance she can act with amazing skill and grace. But due to the torment she faced as a child and her own sense of inferiority, she cannot act in front of anyone as herself. She received a tube of lipstick as a keepsake from her mother before she died. This tube has magic that allows Kasane to take whatever she wants if she kisses it while wearing the lipstick, usually the face of another person. While wearing another person's face, she loses her sense of inferiority and can act nearly flawlessly.
Nina Tanzawa (丹沢 ニナ, Tanzawa Nina)
Portrayed by: Tao Tsuchiya
A beautiful woman, who desires to be a stage actress, but lacks talent as well as suffering from Sleeping Beauty syndrome. She agrees to give her face to Kasane, as long as she gets the credit for everything. However as time goes on, she begins to become dissatisfied with this relationship, sad and angry that her talent is not recognized. She eventually, sneaks on stage during a rehearsal instead of Kasane, but when her performance is declared completely different from "her" previous ones, she tries to kill herself, but only lands up in a coma. Kasane keeps her body, at her home, alive, giving her the title of Kasane and taking Nina's name for her own.
Kingo Habuta (羽生田 釿互, Habuta Kingo)
Portrayed by: Tadanobu Asano
Sukeyo and later Kasane's manager. He is one of the few people who knows the truth of Kasane's and Sukeyo's appearances and how they changed. He greatly admires both of their acting skills. He begins to help Kasane on the request of her mother before she died, and now he hopes to make Kasane into an actress as well known as Sukeyo, and hopefully even better. He was originally a director and he had cast Sukeyo.
Sukeyo Fuchi (淵 透世, Fuchi Sugeyo)
Portrayed by: Rei Dan
Kasane's mother who died in the beginning of the story. She left Kasane a tube of lipstick, with odd properties, that allows Kasane to switch faces with another person, when she kisses them. She was a well-known actor, but it is eventually revealed that she, too used the lipstick, as Kasane presently does.
Ichika Nishizawa (西沢 イチカ, Nishizawa Ichika)
An Elementary-school classmate of Kasane. She was the leader of the bullies in elementary school. She attempted to mock her further by nominating Kasane as Cinderella for the class play and preventing her from practising with everyone else, but the plan backfired when Kasane practiced on her own, and still ended up shining in the first half of the performance. She later threatened Kasane to give up her position as Cinderella for the rest of the play, but Kasane switched faces with her, and locked her in the bathroom, passing herself off as Nishizawa for the remaining performance. After the play, she took Nishizawa to the roof, where she attempted to make peace with her, but failed. In the resulting scuffle, Kasane's cheek was sliced open, resulting in a permanent scar, while Nishizawa fell from the roof to her death.
Iku Igarashi (五十嵐 幾, Igarashi Iku)
The second person, Kasane switched faces with. She was a senior to Kasane, as well as the captain of the acting club. A kind, and loving girl, she attempted to befriend Kasane, by admitting that she too was bullied in her past, and that they were not very different. Her attempts failed when the other members of the club revealed to Kasane that Iku was bullied because of her beauty, as compared to Kasane's ugliness, and that the difference between them couldn't be wider. Hurt and feeling betrayed, Kasane confirmed the truth from Iku, and unable to hate Iku, she could only pity the ugly girls who had once bullied Iku for being compared to her, just as she was. Kasane then drugged Iku, and took her place for her performance in a play, before returning her face to her and later telling Iku to stay away from her forever.

== Media ==
=== Manga ===
Written and illustrated by Daruma Matsuura, Kasane started in Kodansha's seinen manga magazine Evening on April 23, 2013. It finished in the magazine on August 10, 2018. Kodansha has compiled its chapters into fourteen individual tankōbon volumes, published from October 23, 2013, to September 7, 2018.

Kodansha USA announced the digital release of the manga in May 2017.

==== Volumes ====
No.	Original release date	Original ISBN	English release date	English ISBN
1	October 23, 2013	978-4-06-352485-7	May 30, 2017	978-1-68-233721-9
01. "Kasane" (かさね); 02. "Cinderella" (シンデレラ, Shinderera); 03. "Iku Igarashi" (五十嵐 幾, Igarashi Iku); 04. "The Same Starry Sky" (同じ星空, Onaji Hoshizora); 05. "Different Creatures" (違う生きもの, Chigau Ikimono); 06. "Where the Stars Fall" (星の降る場所, Hoshi no Furu Basho); 07. "Visitor" (来訪者, Raihōsha); 08. "Invitation" (いざない, Izanai)
2	January 23, 2014	978-4-06-352497-0	July 4, 2017	978-1-68-233722-6
09. "Neena Tanzawa" (丹沢ニナ, Tanzawa Nina); 10. "The Seagull" (かもめ, Kamome); 11. "Sleeping Beauty" (眠り姫, Nemuri Hime); 12. "Reita Ugou" (烏合零太, Ugō Reita); 13. "Encroaching" (侵蝕(むしばむ), Shinshoku); 14. "Kiss" (キス, Kisu); 15. "Incurring Her Wrath" (逆鱗, Gekirin); 16. "What Can Be Seen Is Everything" (見えるものがすべて, Mieru Mono ga Subete); 17. "The Two Ninas" (二人のニーナ, Futari no Nīna)
3	May 23, 2014	978-4-06-354516-6	July 11, 2017	978-1-68-233723-3
18. "Reduced Circumstances" (落魄, Rakuhaku); 19. "The Life Out of Her" (息の根, Iki no Ne); 20. "Ulterior Motives" (思惑, Omowaku); 21. "Repentance" (懺悔, Zange); 22. "Castle of Thorns" (茨の城, Ibara no Shiro); 23. "Things to be Preserved, Things to be Destroyed" (守るべきもの 壊すべきもの, Mamorubeki Mono Kowasubeki Mono); 24. "Cold-blooded" (冷血, Reiketsu); 25. "Red Thread" (あかい糸, Akai Ito); 26. "Light that Stands Apart" (孤高の光, Kokō no Hikari)
4	October 23, 2014	978-4-06-354539-5	August 1, 2017	978-1-68-233744-8
27. "Salomé" (サロメ, Sarome); 28. "Flash" (閃光, Senkō); 29. "Nogiku" (野菊); 30. "Child of Karma" (因果の子, Inga no Ko); 31. "Want" (求める, Motomeru); 32. "In the Darkness Between" (狭間の闇で, Hazama no Yami de); 33. "Though Blood's Color is Unseen" (血の色の見えずとも, Chi no Iro no Miezu tomo); 34. "Glass Thread" (硝子の糸, Garasu no Ito); 35. "At the Water's Edge" (波打ち際で, Namiuchigiwa de)
5	March 23, 2015	978-4-06-354564-7	September 19, 2017	978-1-68-233900-8
36. "Traces" (残痕, Zankon); 37. "Won't See / Must Not See" (見ようとしない / 見てはいけない, Miyō to Shinai / Mite wa Ikenai); 38. "Outstretched Hand" (差しのべられた手, Sashi Noberareta Te); 39. "Filthy Palms" (よごれた手のひら, Yogoreta Tenohira); 40. "Liar" (嘘吐き, Usotsuki); 41. "Yuuto Amagasaki" (天ヶ崎祐賭, Amagasaki Yūto); 42. "Hellfire" (業火, Gōka); 43. "Retracing the Past" (遡る, Sakanoboru); 44. "Cracks" (亀裂(クラック), Kurakku)
6	July 23, 2015	978-4-06-354583-8	October 17, 2017	978-1-68-233901-5
45. "Door" (扉, Tobira); 46. "The Glass Menagerie" (ガラスの動物園, Garasu no Dōbutsuen); 47. "Shattering Sounds" (砕け散る音, Kudake Chiru Oto); 48. "Touch" (触れる, Fureru); 49. "White Memory" (白い記憶, Shiroi Kioku); 50. "Loss" (消失(うしなう), Ushinau); 51. "Soliloquy" (独白, Dokuhaku); 52. "Curtain Fall" (幕切れ, Makugire); 53. "Rock-Bottom" (どん底, Donzoko)
7	November 20, 2015	978-4-06-354598-2	November 21, 2017	978-1-68-233982-4
54. "Bug Zapper" (誘蛾灯, Yūgatō); 55. "Gnawing At Each Other" (喰い合い, Kui Ai); 56. "Kasaneru" (累ねる); 57. "Fire and a Seal" (火と刻印, Hi to Kokuin); 58. "Rainbow" (虹, Niji); 59. "Bloom" (咲く, Saku); 60. "The Woman Named Saki" (咲朱という女, Saki Toiu Onna); 61. "Burnt Skin" (焼けた肌, Yaketa Hada); 62. "Hues" (色彩(いろもよう), Iromoyō)
8	April 22, 2016	978-4-06-354615-6	December 19, 2017	978-1-68-233983-1
63. "Prophecy" (予言, Yogen); 64. "Ghosts" (亡霊, Bōrei); 65. "Your Patient" (患者, Kanja); 66. "The Color of Blood" (血色(ちのいろ), Chi no Iro); 67. "Transience" (束間(つかのま), Tsuka no Ma); 68. "Sleep" (睡眠, Suimin); 69. "Torch" (灯火(ともしび), Tomoshibi); 70. "Sword" (短剣(つるぎ), Tsurugi); 71. "Poison Fangs" (毒牙, Dokuga)
9	August 23, 2016	978-4-06-354632-3	January 16, 2018	978-1-64-212017-2
72. "End" (終焉, Shūen); 73. "Awakening" (覚醒, Kakusei); 74. "Immortal" (不滅, Fumetsu); 75. "From the Nighttime Rain (1)" (夜の雨の中より1, Yoru no Ame no Naka yori Wan); 76. "From the Nighttime Rain (2)" (夜の雨の中より2, Yoru no Ame no Naka yori Tsū); 77. "From the Nighttime Rain (3)" (夜の雨の中より3, Yoru no Ame no Naka yori Surī); 78. "From the Nighttime Rain (4)" (夜の雨の中より4, Yoru no Ame no Naka yori Fō); 79. "From the Nighttime Rain (5)" (夜の雨の中より5, Yoru no Ame no Naka yori Faibu); 80. "From the Nighttime Rain (6)" (夜の雨の中より6, Yoru no Ame no Naka yori Shikkusu)
10	December 22, 2016	978-4-06-354649-1	February 20, 2018	978-1-64-212117-9
81. "From the Nighttime Rain (7)" (夜の雨の中より7, Yoru no Ame no Naka yori Sebun); 82. "From the Nighttime Rain (8)" (夜の雨の中より8, Yoru no Ame no Naka yori Eito); 83. "From the Nighttime Rain (9)" (夜の雨の中より9, Yoru no Ame no Naka yori Nain); 84. "Unending Epilogue" (終わらない終章(エピローグ), Owaranai Epirōgu); 85. "Shared Isolation" (二人の孤高, Futari no Kokō); 86. "Circle, and Come Forth" (巡り、現れる, Meguri, Arawareru); 87. "Planetarium" (プラネタリウム, Puranetariumu); 88. "Seven Sisters" (すばる, Subaru); 89. "A Familiar Face" (知っている俤(かげ), Shitteiru Kage)
11	June 23, 2017	978-4-06-354667-5	March 20, 2018	978-1-64-212162-9
90. "The Furthest Ends" (最果て, Saihate); 91. "Stardrop" (星・ひとしずく, Hoshi Hito Shizuku); 92. "Actress" (女優, Joyū); 93. "To Surmise" (はかる, Hakaru); 94. "Absent Face" (不在の顔, Fuzai no Kao); 95. "Woman Without a Face" (顔のない女, Kao no Nai Onna); 96. "Bare-Footprints" (はだしの足跡, Hadashi no Ashiato); 97. "Remaining in the Palm" (てのひらに残る, Tenohira ni Nokoru); 98. "Seen in a Backward Glance" (肩ごしの景色, Katagoshi no Keshiki)
12	October 23, 2017	978-4-06-354691-0	May 29, 2018	978-1-64-212235-0
99. "Rising from the Depths of the Heart" (むな底に顕(た)つ, Muna Soko ni Tatsu); 100. "On the Surface" (表層(はだ)のうえで, Hada no Ue de); 101. "Pointing Finger" (さししめす指, Sashishimesu Yubi); 102. "Blood Crystal" (血の結晶, Chi no Kesshō); 103. "Estranged Body" (遠ざかる肉体, Tōzakaru Nikutai); 104. "The Same Creature" (同じ生きもの, Onaji Ikimono); 105. "Daybreak" (早暁, Sōgyō); 106. "Director" (演出家, Enshutsuka); 107. "Things Unseen" (見えないもの, Mienai Mono)
13	April 23, 2018	978-4-06-511252-6; 978-4-06-511252-6 (limited edition)	August 14, 2018	978-1-64-212392-0
108. "Shadows Seen" (見えるは影, Mieru wa Kage); 109. "Witnessing the Shadow" (姿(かげ)に望みし, Kage ni Nozomi shi); 110. "Facing the Devil" (のぞむべき鬼(もの), Nozomu-beki Mono); 111. "Ruin of a Woman" (鬼女(なれ)のはて, Nare no Hate); 112. "Fruit (1)" (果実①, Kajitsu Wan); 113. "Fruit (2)" (果実②, Kajitsu Tsū); 114. "Fruit (3)" (果実③, Kajitsu Surī); 115. "Fruit (4)" (果実④, Kajitsu Fō); 116. "Close" (仕舞, Shimai)
14	September 7, 2018	978-4-06-512567-0	January 8, 2019	978-1-64-212610-5
117. "Born from the Abyss" (奈落より生まれ, Naraku yori Umare); 118. "Flickering in the Darkness" (闇に明滅し, Yami ni Meimetsu); 119. "Even After Curtain Rise" (幕を出でて尚, Maku o Idete Nao); 120. "Struggle" (もがく, Mogaku); 121. "Then, On the Empty Stage" (そして空舞台で, Soshite Kara Butai de); 122. "With an Empty Body" (空の身体のまま, Kara no Karada no Mama); 123. "Hideously, Just Hideously" (醜く只醜く, Miniku Tada Miniku); 124. "Until Curtain Close" (幕引く最期(とき)まで, Maku Hiku Toki made); 125. "Dance, Fragments" (おどる、欠片たち, Odoru, Kakera-tachi); Final Chapter. "Curtain Call" (カーテンコール, Kāten Kōru)

=== Film ===
A live-action film adaptation was announced in 2018, starring Kyoko Yoshine as Kasane Fuchi and Tao Tsuchiya as Nina Tanzawa. The film is directed by Yūichi Satō, with Tsutomu Kuroiwa written the scripts, and Yugo Kanno composed the music. It was released in Japan on September 7, 2018. The theme song for the film is "Black Bird" by Aimer.

== Reception ==
Volume 5 of Kasane reached the 39th place on Oricon's weekly manga charts and, as of March 29, 2015, had sold 31,029 copies.

It was placed 9th in Zenkoku Shotenin ga Eranda Osusume Comic 2015. It placed 10th out of 14 nominees at the 8th Manga Taishō with 30 points. It was also nominated for Best General Manga at the 39th Kodansha Manga Awards. The series ranked tenth in the first Next Manga Award in the print manga category.

The lyrics to the 2019 song "Karma" by heavy metal band Mary's Blood were inspired by Kasane.

== See also ==
- Steel of the Celestial Shadows, another manga series by the same author
