= Onna Michi =

Japanese manga series

- First tankōbon volume cover

オンナミチ
- Genre: Comedy
- Manga
- Written by: Bambi Kitazawa
- Published by: Shogakukan
- Magazine: Big Comic Superior
- Original run: February 24, 2012 – August 8, 2014
- Volumes: 5
- Television drama
- Directed by: Hiroyuki Muramatsu
- Written by: Hiromi Tanaka; Fumi Tsubota
- Music by: Kei Yoshikawa
- Original network: NHK BS Premium (Premium Drama)
- Original run: August 4, 2015 – September 22, 2015
- Episodes: 8
- icon

Onna Michi (オンナミチ; 'Woman's Road') is a Japanese manga series written and illustrated by Bambi Kitazawa. It was serialized in Shogakukan's seinen manga magazine Big Comic Superior from February 2012 to August 2014, with its chapters collected in five tankōbon volumes. An eight-episode television drama adaptation was broadcast from August to September 2015.

== Media ==
=== Manga ===
Written and illustrated by Bambi Kitazawa, Onna Michi was serialized in Shogakukan's seinen manga magazine Big Comic Superior from February 24, 2012, to August 8, 2014. Shogakukan collected its chapters in five tankōbon volumes, released from October 30, 2012, to August 29, 2014. An extra chapter was published in the magazine on July 24, 2015.

==== Volumes ====
No.	Release date	ISBN
1	October 30, 2012	978-4-09-184756-0
2	March 29, 2013	978-4-09-185046-1
3	August 30, 2013	978-4-09-185396-7
4	February 28, 2014	978-4-09-185894-8
5	August 29, 2014	978-4-09-186359-1

=== Drama ===
An eight-episode television drama adaptation was broadcast on NHK BS Premium's Premium Drama programming block from August 4 to September 22, 2015. Little Glee Monster performed the theme song "Kaki Kake no Mirai" (書きかけの未来; "A Half-Written Future").
