= Big Comic Superior =

Japanese manga magazine

- Cover of the February 22, 2008 issue, featuring Okuribito
- Categories: Seinen manga
- Frequency: Semimonthly on 2nd and 4th Fridays
- Circulation: 24,833; (July–September 2026)
- First issue: July 1, 1987
- Company: Shogakukan
- Country: Japan
- Based in: Tokyo
- Language: Japanese
- Website: bigcomicbros.net/bigsuperior/

Big Comic Superior (Japanese: ビッグコミックスペリオール, Hepburn: Biggu Komikku Superiōru) is a semimonthly seinen manga magazine published since July 1, 1987, by Shogakukan in Japan. Its target audience is somewhere between the audience for Big Comic Original and Big Comic Spirits. The magazine has published works by a number of well-known manga artists, including Ryoichi Ikegami, Mochiru Hoshisato, Yū Koyama, Yūji Aoki, Fumi Saimon, Norifusa Mita, George Akiyama, and Buronson.

Superior was originally a special issue of Big Comic Original, published twice monthly on the 1st and 15th. However, since it was selling just as well as the main three magazines (Big Comic, Big Comic Original, and Big Comic Spirits), it began to be released every other week. It is currently released twice monthly on the second and fourth Fridays. As of 2015, Superior has a reported circulation of 115,334 for each issue.

== Series ==
=== Currently running series ===
Title	Author/Artist	Premiered
Ajiichimonme Tsugi Aji	Zenta Abe (story) and Yoshimi Kurata (art)	December 2018
Eisei Otome no Tatakai-kata	Kuzushiro	April 2019
Fool Night (フールナイト, Fūru Naito)	Kasumi Yasuda	November 2020
Football Nation (フットボールネーション, Futtobōru Nēshon)	Yuki Otake	December 2009
Mukashi no Hanashi (むかしのはなし)	Taiyō Matsumoto	May 2020
Mujina Into the Deep	Inio Asano	March 2023
Ramen Saiyūki	Midori Kube (story) and Tan Kawai (art)	February 2020
Steel of the Celestial Shadows (太陽と月の鋼, Taiyō to Tsuki no Hagane)	Daruma Matsuura	June 2020
Tamako Manazashi's Independent Research (まなざし珠子の自由研究, Tamako Manazashi's Independent Research)	Tarō Nogizaka	December 2025
The Sweet Sixty Princess (還暦姫, Kanreki Hime)	Hiroya Oku	December 2025

=== Past series ===
- Aibō by Tamayo Koyasu
- Aji Ichi Monme by Yoshimi Kurata, Yoshita Abe, and Yukie Fukuda
- Ankō: Kaizuri Kaijō Sōsasen, written by Masaki Kitahara and illustrated by Hideki Akiyama with assistance from Fishing Graph
- Azumi by Yū Koyama
- Bow by Terry Yamamoto
- Blood on the Tracks by Shuzo Oshimi
- Chūshun Komawari-kun by Tatsuhiko Yamagami
- Hannari! by Fumi Saimon
- Gigant by Hiroya Oku
- Higake Kin'yūden Komanezumi Shussemichi, written by Toichi Akizuki and illustrated by Kōji Yoshimoto with supervision from Yūji Aoki
- Kiichi!! by Hideki Arai
- Zankyō by Tsutomu Takahashi
- Kotarō wa Hitori Gurashi by Mami Tsumura
- Lord, written by Buronson and illustrated by Ryoichi Ikegami
- Mabataki no Oto by Shuzo Oshimi
- Maihime: Diva, written by Ryō Kurashina and illustrated by Tomoya Ōishi
- Mobile Suit Gundam Thunderbolt by Yasuo Ohtagaki
- Money no Ken by Norifusa Mita
- Moonlight Mile by Yasuo Ōtagaki
- Natsume Arata no Kekkon by Tarō Nogizaka
- Ojuken no Hoshi, story by Mayu Sugiura, illustrated by Kenjū Imatani and created by Nozomi Hashira
- Onna Michi by Bambi Kitazawa
- Okuribito by Akira Sasō
- Phobia by Katsunori Hara
- Radio Jikan by Radio Wada
- Rāmen Hakkenden, written by Rokurō Kube and illustrated by Tan Kawai
- Reiraku by Inio Asano
- Sekai no Chūshin de Kuda o Maku by Inosuke Rodriguez
- Shakaijin Misaki Satoru by Yasuyuki Kunitomo
- Sprite by Yūgo Ishikawa
- Super Ball Girls, written by Muneyuki Kaneshiro and illustrated by Akira Hiramoto
- Team Medical Dragon, written by Akira Nagai and illustrated by Tarō Nogizaka
- Trillion Game, written by Riichiro Inagaki and illustrated by Ryoichi Ikegami
- Wonderland by Yugo Ishikawa
