= Yūgo Ishikawa =

Japanese manga artist (born 1960)

Yūgo Ishikawa (石川優吾, Yūgo Ishikawa, born February 9, 1960 in Shijonawate, Osaka, Japan) is a Japanese manga artist. He made his debut in Young Jump with Kakumei Route 163 in 1982.

He is best known for his series Yoiko and Fighting Beauty Wulong.

== Selected works ==
- Tanki (童乱＜タンキー＞)
- Orei wa Mite no Okaeri (お礼は見てのお帰り)
- Yoiko (よいこ)
- Fighting Beauty Wulong (格闘美神 武龍)
- Do! Rill!! (どりる)
- Soda-mura no Sonchō-san (ソーダ村の村長さん)
- Kappa no Kaikata (カッパの飼い方)
- Sprite (スプライ)
