= Gemma Brooke Allen =

American actress

- Born: Los Angeles, California, U.S.
- Occupation: Actress
- Years active: 2012–present

Gemma Brooke Allen is an American actress. She is best known for playing Beverly in the comedy film Mixtape.

== Early life ==
Allen was born in Los Angeles, California to Nicholai and Amy Harrison Allen. She attended a private school in L.A., then took acting classes at the Marnie Cooper School of Acting in 2016. In 2019, she attended the "Act With Alice" facility in Los Angeles to finish her stage acting classes.

== Career ==
Early on in her career, Allen made appearances in various television shows such as the sitcom Dr. Ken, the drama series SEAL Team and the sitcom Teachers. She was then cast as a younger version of Mary Elizabeth Winsteads character in the action film Kate.Her first lead role was as Beverly in the comedy film Mixtape. During filming Allen became close with co-star Julie Bowen and taught her Tik-Tok dances. She got to keep the mixtape after filming was complete

== Personal life ==
Allen is a big fan of '90s music and fashion.

== Filmography ==
=== Film ===
Year	Title	Role	Notes
2012	Youth of Today	Gemma	
2015	Crafty: Or (The Unexpected Virtue of the Girl in Charge of Snacks)	Kristina	Short
2016	The Hollywouldn'ts	Judy	
2017	Playdates	Hannah	
2018	Daddy Issues	Becca	
2018	Black Pumpkin	Regan Peterson	
2019	Nana	Judy	
2021	Kate	Young Kate	
2021	Mixtape	Beverly	
2021	Work Wife	Jojo	

=== Television ===
Year	Title	Role	Notes
2015	Baby Daddy	Young Riley	Episode; It's a Nice Day for a Wheeler Wedding
2016	Fresh Off the Boat	Janice	Episode; Where Are the Giggles?
2016	Dr. Ken	Little Girl	Episode; A Park Family Christmas
2017	SEAL Team	Terrified Child	Episode; Ghost of Christmas Future
2017	Teachers	Eliza	Episode; Passive Eggressive
