= Draw This, Then Die! =

Japanese manga series

- First tankōbon volume cover, featuring Ai Yasumi

これ描いて死ね (Kore Kaite Shine)
- Genre: Coming-of-age; Drama
- Manga
- Written by: Minoru Toyoda
- Published by: Shogakukan
- English publisher: NA: Seven Seas Entertainment
- Imprint: Shōnen Sunday Comics Special
- Magazine: Monthly Shōnen Sunday
- Original run: November 12, 2021 – present
- Volumes: 10
- Anime television series
- Directed by: Hiroaki Akagi
- Written by: Hiroko Fukuda; Aki Itami; Kanichi Katō
- Music by: Hiroaki Tsutsumi
- Studio: Shin-Ei Animation
- Licensed by: Crunchyroll: SEA: Muse Communication
- Original network: NNS (Nippon TV)
- Original run: July 3, 2026 – present
- Episodes: 12
- icon

Draw This, Then Die! (Japanese: これ描いて死ね, Hepburn: Kore Kaite Shine) is a Japanese manga series written and illustrated by Minoru Toyoda. It has been serialized in Shogakukan's shōnen manga magazine Monthly Shōnen Sunday since November 2021, with its chapters collected into ten tankōbon volumes as of July 2026. An anime television series adaptation produced by Shin-Ei Animation aired from July to September 2026. A second season has been announced.

The series was awarded the 16th Manga Taishō in 2023 and the 70th Shogakukan Manga Award in 2024.

== Plot ==
Ai Yasumi is a first-year high school student living on Izu Ōshima, an island that is part of Tokyo Metropolis. She loves to read manga, but a certain event triggered her to start thinking about creating manga. The world that awaits her and the pain and joy of creating works of art is spared.

== Characters ==
Ai Yasumi (安海 相, Yasumi Ai)
Voiced by: Akira Sekine (Japanese); Audrey Hsieh (English)
Rei Teshima (手島 零, Teshima Rei)
Voiced by: Saori Hayami (Japanese); Crystal Lee (English)
Kokoro Fujimori (藤森 心, Fujimori Kokoro)
Voiced by: Saya Hitomi (Japanese); Madeline Dorroh (English)
Sachi Akafuku (赤福 幸, Akafuku Sachi)
Voiced by: Kanon Fujimura (Japanese); LilyPichu (English)
Hikaru Sekiryū (石龍 光, Sekiryū Hikaru)
Voiced by: Inori Minase (Japanese); Justine Huxley (English)
Pokota (ポコ太)
Voiced by: Noriko Hidaka (Japanese); Francesca Calo (English)
Nana Teramura (寺村 七, Teramura Nana)
Voiced by: Atsumi Tanezaki (Japanese); Amber Lee Connors (English)
Hana Kongōji (金剛寺 華, Kongōji Hana)
Voiced by: Yukana
Hebichika-sensei (へびちか先生)
Voiced by: Kikuko Inoue (Japanese); Christie Cate (English)
Loup Garou (ルゥ・ガルゥ, Ruu Garuu)
Voiced by: Anna Nagase

== Media ==
=== Manga ===
Written and illustrated by Minoru Toyoda, Draw This, Then Die! began serialization in Shogakukan's shōnen manga magazine Monthly Shōnen Sunday on November 12, 2021, with the first tankōbon volume released on May 12, 2022. As of July 2026, ten volumes have been released.

In October 2025, Seven Seas Entertainment announced that they had licensed the series for English publication, with the first volume set to release in August 2026.

==== Volumes ====
No.	Original release date	Original ISBN	English release date	English ISBN
1	May 12, 2022	978-4-09-851143-3	August 11, 2026	979-8-89765-903-6
2	October 12, 2022	978-4-09-851326-0	November 3, 2026	979-8-89765-904-3
3	April 12, 2023	978-4-09-852021-3	—	—
4	September 12, 2023	978-4-09-852816-5	—	—
5	February 9, 2024	978-4-09-853140-0	—	—
6	August 8, 2024	978-4-09-853538-5	—	—
7	April 11, 2025	978-4-09-854061-7	—	—
8	October 10, 2025	978-4-09-854277-2	—	—
9	June 12, 2026	978-4-09-854646-6	—	—
10	July 10, 2026	978-4-09-854701-2	—	—

=== Anime ===
An anime television series adaptation was announced on March 21, 2025. It is produced by Shin-Ei Animation and directed by Hiroaki Akagi, with series composition handled by Hiroko Fukuda, who also wrote the episode screenplays with Aki Itami and Kanichi Katō, characters designed by Takekazu Segawa, and music composed by Hiroaki Tsutsumi. The series aired from July 3 to September 25, 2026, on the Friday Anime Night programming block on Nippon TV and its affiliates. The opening theme song is "Isho" (遺書), performed by Tatsuya Kitani, and the ending theme song is "Conifer" (コニファー), performed by Regal Lily. Crunchyroll is streaming the series. Muse Communication licensed the series in Southeast Asia.

A second season was announced following the airing of the twelfth episode.

==== Episodes ====
No.	Title	Directed by (Note: Production staff information is taken from the ending credits of each episode.)	Written by	Storyboarded by	Original release date
1	"Magic House: What Would a Manga Protagonist Do Here?"; Transliteration: "Mahō Yashiki: Konna Toki, Manga no Shujinkō nara?" (Japanese: 魔法屋敷〜こんなとき、漫画の主人公なら？)	Hiroaki Akagi, Hitomi Ezoe & Takahiro Enokida	Hiroko Fukuda	Hiroaki Akagi	July 3, 2026
On the island of Izu Ōshima, shy young girl Ai Yasumi enters a book rental shop, where she picks up the sole volume of Rei Hoshino's Robota & Pokota and becomes an avid manga reader. She rereads it to the point where she makes up an imaginary friend based on Pokota, and continually rents it all the way to the start of high school, to the chagrin of her teacher Rei Teshima. Ai attempts to return it but gets cold feet and is unable to afford buying it out. After saving a classmate's painting on the way to school, Ai gets caught reading the manga during class. Teshima seizes it and lectures her on its negative influence. Ai responds that it helped her learn to make friends, recalling how she defended a trio of girls from a dog, but her teacher is unmoved. After school, Ai finds out that the reclusive Hoshino will sell a new Robota & Pokota doujinshi at COMITIA in Tokyo proper. The next day, she sneaks off to Tokyo. At COMITIA, Ai gets a manga from the event's featured artist Stone Dragon before seeing the various exhibitors. Arriving at Hoshino's stand, Ai reaches the front to find Teshima manning it; she is Hoshino's true identity. Teshima initially obscures her face and sells Ai two copies, but when the girl gets overly emotional, she again reprimands her. When Ai says she was preparing to stay until nightfall, Teshima immediately gives away the rest of her stock and rushes her to the last ferry back, and is left unnerved by the circumstances.
2	"You Are Brilliant: Drawing Manga Is Hard"; Transliteration: "Anata wa Kagayaite Iru: Manga o Kaku no wa Taihen de Aru" (Japanese: あなたは輝いている〜漫画を描くのは大変である)	Yoshiyuki Shirahata	Hiroko Fukuda	Yoshiyuki Shirahata	July 10, 2026
Rei Teshima, the daughter of a manga publisher, grew up reading manga. While attending university, she decides to make her own, but is caught off guard by the amount of time and effort required. She submits her first work to Spirits magazine. Editor Hana Kongōji likes the manga but determines that she needs to improve her quality. Rei takes it as a personal criticism and imagines herself bombing Shogakukan headquarters. She continues trying out different stories and improving her art, but remains unable to get published. In the present day, Rei scolds Ai for her truancy, but the starstruck girl tunes her out. Interpreting Ai's expressions of admiration as contrition, she decides not to report her to her parents. The next day, Ai tells her best friend and classmate Sachi Akafuku Rei's secret. The two propose to create a manga club, but Rei refuses. She relents when Sachi threatens to report her for engaging in commercial activity as a civil servant, but on the condition that Ai makes her own manga. Rei later meets the book shop's proprietor, her old friend Nana Teramura, and expresses her desire to leave Izu Ōshima after getting exposed by Ai and her disillusionment with manga. She admits she only accepted the proposal so that Ai would fail and give up. Nana expresses skepticism and guesses that Rei still secretly wants to make more manga. One week later, Ai submits to Rei Nekota & Nyanta. (Note: Nekota & Nyanta is a fantasy manga that features a pair of anthropomorphic cats fighting supervillains. The title is a rip-off of Robota & Pokota.) Rei is amazed by Ai's sincere efforts and begins to cry. To console her, Ai tells her about her imaginary friend encouraging her to complete it. Moved by her passion, she agrees to become club advisor and hands them the club application form. The girls peruse it only to find that they need a third member. After going home from school, student Kokoro Fujimori gets scolded by her mother for entering through the main entrance of her family's ryokan instead of the service entrance, unaware that it was under renovation. Noticing her hairpins, Mrs. Fujimori reprimands her for wearing what she considers a childish accessory and removes them from her hair. Kokoro is left stifled by the encounter.
3	"Kokoro's Heart: Draw This, Then Die!!!!"; Transliteration: "Kokoro no Kokoro: Kore Kaite Shine!!!!" (Japanese: 心の心〜これ描いて死ね!!!!)	Hiroki Imamura	Aki Itami	Hiroki Imamura	July 18, 2026 (Note: This episode aired at midnight JST, 30 minutes after the regular air time on Nippon Television.)
After one year of fruitless efforts, Kongōji says Rei needs to have a theme to her work. Believing that that should not require publishing, Rei decides to take part in COMITIA. She ends up placed next to her mangaka idol Hebichika-sensei, leaving her unable to sell her doujinshi Serial. When Rei realizes who she is, she hands her a copy and asks how she can be a great manga artist. Hebichika suggests bloodlust. After graduating without job offers, Rei creates a set of principles for making a manga, with a focus on total service of the audience. She gets the inspiration to make Heartbeat Love Romance, which gets published under the name “Rei Hoshino” and nets her an honorable mention at the Shogakukan Manga Award, to her dissatisfaction. Kongōji decides to hire her for Spirits. In the present day, Kokoro misses an opportunity to give her seat on the bus to an elderly woman and sees her classmate Ai running up the hill to school. Ai forces Sachi to help find a club they can share with by giving away copies of Nekota & Nyanta, but they are ridiculed and rejected. Ai visits the art room and accidentally causes a mess in front of Kokoro. She hands over the manga to Kokoro, who is unable to express her enjoyment. She compliments Kokoro's painting skills and hairpins, but Kokoro is unable to respond or reveal that the art club will be disbanded before Ai leaves. She takes the manga home to redraw it. After school, Ai finds Rei at the book shop with Nana and tells her about her failure to find a room. Rei talks about the joys and struggles of making manga, which gives Ai whiplash. After fending off Nana's advances, Rei proposes to use the book shop for the club. Ai tells Sachi the next day; Kokoro overhears it and is disappointed. She works up the nerve to hand over her redrawn version of Nekota & Nyanta to Ai and asks to join the manga club. At the shop, Rei reminds the girls not to lose sight of their studies nor to pursue a career in manga. While cleaning up the meeting room, Ai shows Kokoro Robota & Pokota. Kokoro offers to become Ai's manga partner, and Ai agrees.
4	"Utopia: Making Manga's Better with Others"; Transliteration: "Yūtopia: Manga-zukuri ni Nakama wa Iru Hō ga Ii" (Japanese: ユートピア〜漫画づくりに仲間はいるほうがいい)	Tarō Kubo	Aki Itami	Jūteki Ippatsu	July 24, 2026
The girls build new shelves for the club's meeting room. Ai decides to draw with analog materials and gets advice on drawing manga from Rei. She and Kokoro work on new versions of Nekota & Nyanta, but Kokoro keeps getting attention for her drawings. Rei asks Ai to improve her writing. At Pokota's suggestion, she asks Kokoro for help and takes up her request to climb the hill with her. As an online follower of Stone Dragon, Kokoro suggests she imitate her usage of end drawings. With her and Sachi's advice, she submits a new manga to Rei the next day. Rei notices that they inadvertently used the inductive method to create the narrative. A gust of wind causes the drawings to fly off, catching the attention of a new student, Sekiryū. When she reveals that she also likes manga, Ai contemplates the new girl's name and realizes she is Stone Dragon. Rei provides additional furniture for the club and assigns roles for the new manga, adding new instruments and giving advice as they progress. They finish the manga after three days. While they celebrate, Sekiryū comes by to ask Ai to accompany her to the beach. Sekiryū reveals that she wants to make a manga about Izu Ōshima and that she came to the island on her mother's insistence. She notices Ai talking to Pokota and reveals she has her own imaginary friends that Ai can sense. She reveals her first name, Hikaru, and addresses Ai on a first-name basis. Hikaru reveals herself to be a fan of Robota & Pokota. Ai gives Hikaru the club’s new manga The Princess's Favor. (Note: In The Princess's Favor, a cat princess turns transparent and luminous when successfully courted by a suitor. Unimpressed by the many princes who try to woo her with material riches, her humble maid has an intimate talk with her where she suggests that she focus on people's inner beauty instead. The maid's words cause the princess to become transparent.) Hikaru asks if Ai would come to COMITIA; in response, Ai asks her to join the manga club. Hikaru declines but changes her mind when Ai reveals that the advisor is the author of Robota & Pokota. At the meeting the next day, Hikaru clings to Rei to express her admiration before kissing her on the lips. Satisfied, Hikaru declares that Ai will go with her to COMITIA.
5	"Let's All Go Together!: Put Your Feelings into Manga"; Transliteration: "Minna de Ikō!: Manga ni "Omoi" o Komeyō" (Japanese: みんなで行こう！〜漫画に「想い」をこめよう)	Akiyo Ōhashi	Hiroko Fukuda	Akiyo Ōhashi	July 31, 2026
Rei attempts to dissuade the girls from participating in COMITIA by citing the efforts and barriers to actually make such a work, but when Hikaru takes it as a challenge, she returns the next day with an itinerary proposal. As Hikaru applied separately, the others have to seek permission from their parents. Kokoro remains unable to ask her mother. The next day, the girls decide to study at the Fujimoris' ryokan. When Sachi inadvertently reveals to Mrs. Fujimori their membership of the manga club, she becomes irate. Hikaru intervenes by buying a reservation and contacting her mother to sign off on the matter. Kokoro confesses her struggle with opening up to the others; Hikaru responds by saying she overcomes such problems by communicating through manga. Inspired by this, Kokoro creates an epistolary manga, Dear Mom, addressing her issues with her mother. (Note: In Dear Mom, Kokoro discusses how her mother's constant scolding has damaged her self-esteem. She explains the importance of her hairpins (a gift from her father) and how joining the manga club gave her a chance to make new friends. It concludes with her explaining why she wrote it instead of talking to her directly and an appeal to let her enjoy making manga.) After reading it, Mrs. Fujimori gives her approval on the condition that Kokoro makes a second manga for her when she returns. With all the permission forms completed, Rei warns Hikaru that she has to put up her grades for the upcoming exams to avoid repeating a year again. Shocked, the other girls force her to study, and she gets a score over 50. After the club gets accepted to COMITIA, Ai and Kokoro decide to create a compilation of their manga under the pen name "Sou Akafuku". Ai asks Rei if she ever drew manga at a family restaurant; she confirms it and recalls how she would draw until sunrise. With the manga, Cats, Cats and More Cats, printed, the club sets off for Tokyo with Nana. At the hotel, Hikaru finds Ai's original version of Nekota & Nyanta and admires Ai's pure expression before imagining befriending Nekota. Left unable to sleep, Ai stays up all night at the hotel's restaurant creating a new manga. She asks Rei if she could sell it alongside their compilation; Rei expresses concern for her health while Hikaru reads it and laughs. When Sachi expresses her praise for Tokyo, Rei reveals that they were unable to get a good hotel near the Big Sight and are actually staying in Maihama, Chiba.
6	"Comitia: Let's Make Manga That's Even More Interesting!"; Transliteration: "Komitia: Motto Omoshiroi Manga o Egakō!" (Japanese: コミティア〜もっと面白い漫画を描こう！)	Hitomi Ezoe & Yoshiyuki Shirahata	Hiroko Fukuda	Shōji Nishida	August 7, 2026
After her encounter with Hebichika at COMITIA, Rei ends up selling a single copy of Serial. She imagines herself marrying the woman who bought the copy and makes a manga about it. Kongōji reviews the manga and is impressed with its potential, which encourages Rei to make more manga. However, the others do not reach the same peak. Kongōji suggests getting apprenticed and offers to have her work as one of Hebichika's assistants. A thrilled Rei takes the opportunity, but working with her does not lead to any meaningful results, and she has a mental breakdown. Sometime later, Rei receives a call from Kongōji while onboard a ship. Frustrated, she throws her phone overboard. In the present day, Ai makes copies of her new manga before the event. Rei explains the basics of selling manga at COMITIA to Ai, Sachi, and Kokoro. With only room for two seats, Rei and Sachi set off to explore the venue. While contemplating her previous visits to COMITIA, Rei notices one particular manga seller and bitterly walks away. Ai and Kokoro are driven to joyous tears when they manage to sell a copy of Cats, Cats and More Cats. While exploring the venue, Ai is called out by another teen mangaka with the pen name Loup Garou. She notices her shirt and boasts of being from Shichijo-jima, then cajoles Ai into buying her manga. Ai encounters Hikaru, who managed to sell off her stock. Hikaru reveals that she actually thinks Ai's manga is terrible. Ai returns to find that another copy of the compilation has been sold, but her own manga is still on the stand. Loup Garou suddenly comes by the stand and reads Ai's manga, Country Cats Go to Tokyo. (Note: Written under the pen name "Yasumin", Country Cats Go to Tokyo focuses on a quartet of cats who head to the city. However, they are almost instantaneously accosted by an "Evil Black Dragon Bad Bad Cat-Eater Plant". The cats fight the monster for ten pages. After successfully defeating it, the cats decide to take a rest in a hut, unaware that it was actually a rocket. The rocket blasts off and the cats land on the Moon, at which point the manga ends.) Reading it causes Loup Garou to cry, but she refuses to buy it out of jealousy, to Ai's frustration. Sachi insults Loup Garou's manga, causing her to run off. Kokoro returns to the stand with Hikaru and numerous books. Just before the end of COMITIA, an elderly Kongōji comes by. When Rei sees her, she apologizes for her behavior. Kongōji reveals that Rei had contacted her in the run-up to the previous COMITIA but was never able to meet due to the mishap caused by Ai sneaking off to Tokyo. Kongōji hands over her business card showing her as the deputy editor-in-chief of Gessan to the girls. Kongōji recognizes Hikaru, but the latter does not recall who she is. She reviews Cats, Cats and More Cats and Country Cats Go to Tokyo and orders the former, to Ai's disappointment. Kongōji tells Ai that she won't buy it out of pity, but Rei, Hikaru, Kokoro, and Sachi decide to buy Ai's manga to cheer her up. This inspires her to improve her skills and make a better manga. Later that night, while on the ferry going back to Shichiro-jima, Loup Garou contemplates Ai's manga and realizes to her regret that she should have bought it instead.
7	"The Lost World: Draw with the Intent to Kill"; Transliteration: "Rosuto Wārudo: Korosu Tsumori de Egakō" (Japanese: ロストワールド〜殺すつもりで描こう)	Park Kyung-sun	Aki Itami	Hiroaki Yoshikawa	August 21, 2026
8	"Touch: 100 Things I Want to Draw for Manga!!!"; Transliteration: "Tatchi: Manga de Egakitai Hyaku no Koto!!!" (Japanese: タッチ〜漫画で描きたい100のコト!!!)	Takahiro Enokida	Kanichi Katō	Takahiro Enokida	August 28, 2026
9	"Surfing the Cyber Seas: Draw for Yourself, Not for Others!"; Transliteration: "Denshi no Umi e: Dare no Tame de mo Naku, Jibun no Tame ni Egakō!" (Japanese: 電子の海へ〜誰のためでもなく、自分のために描こう！)	Tarō Kubo	Aki Itami	Shōji Nishida	September 4, 2026
10	"90% of Everything Is Crap: I Need Friends to Become Stronger Than Mama"; Transliteration: "Konoyo no Kyūjū Pāsento wa Kasu de Aru: Mama yori Tsuyoku Naru ni wa "Tomodachi" ga Hitsuyō de Aru" (Japanese: この世の90%はカスである〜ママより強くなるには「友達」が必要である)	Takuya Ogasawara	Aki Itami	Takuya Ogasawara	September 11, 2026
11	"The Two of Us: Partners Who Complement Each Other Are Precious!"; Transliteration: "Futari: Oginai Aeru Nakama wa Tōtoi!" (Japanese: ふたり〜補いあえる仲間は尊い！)	Hiroki Imamura & Yoshiyuki Shirahata	Hiroko Fukuda	Hiroki Imamura & Yoshiyuki Shirahata	September 18, 2026
12	"Next World: Draw What You Love. Now and Forever..."; Transliteration: "Kitarubeki Sekai: Suki na Mono o Egakō. Kono Saki mo, Zutto..." (Japanese: 来るべき世界〜好きなものを描こう。この先も、ずっと…)	Hiroaki Akagi & Takahiro Enokida	Hiroko Fukuda	Hiroaki Akagi & Takahiro Enokida	September 25, 2026

== Reception ==
In 2022, Draw This, Then Die! was nominated in the eighth Next Manga Awards in the Print Manga category, where it placed sixteenth out of 50 nominees. It ranked sixth in the 2023 edition of Takarajimasha's Kono Manga ga Sugoi! list of best manga for male readers. The series won the 16th Manga Taishō in 2023. Along with Burning Kabaddi, Natsume Arata no Kekkon, and Puniru Is a Cute Slime, it also won the 70th Shogakukan Manga Award in 2024. It has also been nominated for the 30th Tezuka Osamu Cultural Prize in 2026.

== See also ==
- Love Roma, another manga series by the same author
- Kongōji-san wa Mendōkusai, another manga series by the same author
