= Miku Martineau =

Canadian actress

- Born: Miku Patricia Martineau; September 13, 2004 (age 22); Toronto, Ontario, Canada
- Occupations: Actress, voiceover artist, singer
- Years active: 2015–present

Miku Patricia Martineau (born September 13, 2004) is a Canadian actress, voiceover artist, and singer. She gained prominence for her role as Ani in the film Kate (2021) and has since appeared in various film and television projects, including Honor Society (2022), Star Trek: Section 31 (2025), and the Netflix series Bet (2025) and Crew Girl (2026).

== Early life and education ==
Martineau was born in Toronto, Canada, to Peter Martineau and Kumiko Martineau, who is of Japanese roots. She pursued formal training at the Randolph College for the Performing Arts in Toronto, where she studied acting, singing, and dancing.

== Career ==
In 2022, Martineau appeared as Christine in the teen comedy Honor Society. By 2025, she transitioned to science fiction, playing a young Philippa Georgiou in Star Trek: Section 31, a Paramount+ film that premiered January 24, 2025, exploring the backstory of Michelle Yeoh’s character.

== Filmography ==
=== Film ===
Year	Title	Role	Notes
2021	Kate	Ani	
2022	Honor Society	Christine	
2025	Star Trek: Section 31	Young Philippa Georgiou	
2025	Katarakt		Short film
2025	Tipping Uber Alice	Yuki	Short film

=== Television ===
Year	Title	Role	Notes
2020	Carl's Car Wash	Lina	Voice Role
2020	Finny the Shark	Chloe	Voice Role
2022	Ruby and the Well	Amy Fitzgerald	Episode: "I Wish She Would Trust Me"
2025	Bet	Yumeko	Main Role
2026	The Miniature Wife	Jackie	3 episodes
2026	Crew Girl	Teagan Tao	Main Role
