= Love Roma =

Japanese manga series

- First tankōbon volume cover, featuring Yumiko Negishi (left) and Hajime Hoshino (right)

ラブロマ (Rabu Roma)
- Genre: Romantic comedy
- Manga
- Written by: Minoru Toyoda
- Published by: Kodansha (former); Shogakukan
- English publisher: NA: Del Rey Manga
- Imprint: Afternoon KC
- Magazine: Monthly Afternoon
- Original run: April 25, 2002 – October 25, 2005
- Volumes: 5
- icon

Love Roma (Japanese: ラブロマ, Hepburn: Rabu Roma) is a Japanese manga series written and illustrated by Minoru Toyoda. It was serialized in Kodansha's seinen manga magazine Monthly Afternoon from April 2002 to October 2005, and published in five tankōbon volumes.

== Plot ==
In the middle of class, first-year high school student Hajime Hoshino suddenly asks his classmate, Yumiko Negishi, to go out with him, confessing his love for her. Negishi refuses, so they settle on walking home together, to the amusement of their class. The next day, spurred by Hoshino's candidness, Negishi asks him to go out with her, beginning what would become a romantic relationship that would last through the rest of their high school years.

== Characters ==
Hajime Hoshino (星野 一, Hoshino Hajime)
An honest guy who always says what he thinks. He has loved Negishi since the first moment he saw her, but he did not have the courage to act upon according to his feelings; from that moment on, he decided he would always be honest.
Yumiko Negishi (根岸 由美子, Negishi Yumiko)
The girl Hoshino loves; she has more common sense than he does, and thus she often slaps or punches him out of embarrassment. She gets embarrassed when their relationship is put on display to the high school public. Negishi is a horrible cook who can barely make any edible food.
Yoko Meguro (目黒 陽子, Meguro Yoko)
Negishi's best friend. She often thinks of absurd plans for Hoshino. Despite this, she supports their relationship.
Toshio Tsukahara (塚原 敏男, Tsukahara Toshio)
Hoshino's best friend. Unlike Hoshino, he tends to be rational in his decision-making. Although he generally sees through Yoko's pranks he stays silent, preferring to be the onlooker.
Wada (和田)
A member of the Occult Research Club. Often referred to as "Wada-san" (和田さん).
Yoshitsune Mizumoto (水元 義経, Mizumoto Yoshitsune)
A member of Tsukahara's band and Hoshino's classmate.

== Publication ==
Written and illustrated by Minoru Toyoda, the series originated as a one-shot published in the June 2002 issue of Kodansha's seinen manga magazine Monthly Afternoon, (Note: Released on April 25, 2002.) after it won the Grand Prize of the Spring 2002 Afternoon Shiki Shō (アフタヌーン四季賞; 'Afternoon Four Seasons Award'). A sequel to the one-shot was published seven months after in the January 2003 issue, (Note: Released on November 25, 2002.) and was later turned into a full series which began serialization in Monthly Afternoon on March 25, 2003. The series completed serialization on October 25, 2005. Its chapters, referred to as "tracks", were collected into five tankōbon volumes. In 2012, Shogakukan began re-releasing the volumes in shinsōban format.

In February 2005, Del Rey Manga announced that they licensed the series for English publication, with five volumes published between August 30, 2005, and February 27, 2007.

=== Volumes ===
| No. | Original release date | Original ISBN | English release date | English ISBN |
|---|---|---|---|---|
| 1 | September 22, 2003 | 978-4-06-314330-0 | August 30, 2005 | 978-0-34548-262-4 |
0. Demo Track; Side A: "It's Nice to Meet You, I'm Hoshino" (はじめましてホシノです, Hajimemashite Hoshino Desu); Side B: "I'm Negishi, It's Nice to Meet You" (どうぞよろしくネギシです, Dōzo Yoroshiku Negishi Desu); 0. Track 0; Side A: "How to Kiss"; Side B: "Negishi's Dream; Hoshino's Dream" (ネギシのドリーム ホシノのドリーム, Negishi no Dorīmu; Hoshino no Dorīmu); 1. "We Had a Fight and Made Up" (喧嘩して仲直り, Kenka Shite Nakanaori); Side A: "We Had a Fight and Made Up" (喧嘩して仲直り, Kenka Shite Nakanaori); Side B: "A Matchless Couple" (無敵のカップル, Muteki no Kappuru); 2. "Love's Lunchbox" (愛のお弁当, Ai no Obentō); 3. "Love Letter Anxiety" (不安ラブレター, Fuan Raburetā); 4. "My Visit to Negishi-san's" (ネギシさんちにおじゃまします, Negishi-san Chi ni Ojama Shimasu)
| 2 | April 23, 2004 | 978-4-06-314346-1 | January 31, 2006 | 978-0-34548-263-1 |
5. "At Your Own Pace" (二人のペース, Futari no Pēsu); Side A: "We Are Boys" (僕たち男の子, Bokutachi Otokonoko); Side B: "You Are Girls" (君たち女の子, Kimitachi Onnanoko); 6. "Ghost Story in School" (学校で怪談, Gakkō de Kaidan); 7. "Igniting the School Festival" (燃えろ文化祭, Moero Bunkasai); 8. "Hoshi-Negi's Romantic Situation" (ホシネギ恋愛事情, Hoshi-Negi Renai Jijō); 9. "Hoshino's Smile Looks Good" (笑顔になるホシノ, Egao ni Naru Hoshino); 10. "A Knock-out Christmas!!" (クリスマスをぶっ飛ばせ!!, Kurisumasu o Buttobase!!); 11. "A Nice Job" (ステキなお仕事, Sutekina Oshigoto)
| 3 | September 22, 2004 | 978-4-06-314354-6 | June 27, 2006 | 978-0-34548-264-8 |
12. "Hoshino the Dreamer" (夢みるホシノ, Yumemiru Hoshino); 13. "From Today, We're Second-Year Students" (今日から二年生, Kyō kara Ninensei); 14. "Next Step"; Side A: "Growing Up"; Side B: "Touchdown"; 15. "Another Love Roma" (アナザーラブロマ, Anazā Rabu Roma); 16. "Visiting Hoshino-kun's Family" (ホシノくんちにおじゃまします, Hoshino-kun Chi ni Ojama Shimasu); 17. "Let's All Go to the Island" (みんなで島に行こう, Minna de Shima ni Ikō); 18. "We All Came to the Island" (みんなで島に来たよ, Minna de Shima ni Kitayo)
| 4 | April 22, 2005 | 978-4-06-314375-1 | October 31, 2006 | 978-0-34548-265-5 |
19. "Run, Hoshino" (走れホシノ, Hashire Hoshino); 20. "Thinker Negishi" (考えるネギシ, Kangaeru Negishi); 21. "Jealous For You" (君にヤキモチ, Kimi ni Yakimochi); 22. "I'm Going to Prep School" (予備校に行ってきます, Yobikō ni Ittekimasu); 23. "First Love Valentine" (初恋バレンタイン, Hatsukoi Barentain); 24. "Hoshino Sheds a Tear" (涙流すホシノ, Namida Nagasu Hoshino); 25. "Saeki-san's Friends" (冴木さんの友達, Saeki-san no Tomodachi)
| 5 | December 22, 2005 | 978-4-06-314397-3 | February 27, 2007 | 978-0-34549-251-7 |
26. "Going on a Date" (二人でデート, Futari de Dēto); 27. "A Man's Feelings" (男のキモチ, Otoko no Kimochi); 28. "Dear Hoshino-kun" (拝啓ホシノくん, Haikei Hoshino-kun); 29. "Dating Together with Friends" (みんなでデート, Minna de Dēto); 30. "Let's Spend the Night Together"; 31. "How's Everybody Doing?" (みんな元気かい?, Minna Genki Kai?); 32. "It's a Beautiful Day"

== Reception ==
Carl Kimlinger of Anime News Network described it as a "warm, honest adolescent love story", while also stating that it can be repetitive at times. A reviewer for Publishers Weekly expressed similar opinions on the story as Kimlinger. They also compared the illustrations to those of John Porcellino and Jeffrey Brown. In Manga: The Complete Guide, Jason Thompson wrote that the artwork, which he felt was similar to indie comics, complemented the story well. Conversely, Carlo Santos of Anime News Network was more reserved, describing the art style and dialogue as "simple and to the point", and thus an acquired taste.

== See also ==
- Draw This, Then Die!, another manga series by the same author
- Kongōji-san wa Mendōkusai, another manga series by the same author
