= I Used to Be Funny =

2023 film by Ally Pankiw

- Theatrical release poster
- Directed by: Ally Pankiw
- Written by: Ally Pankiw
- Produced by: James Weyman; Jason Aita; Breann Smordi
- Starring: Rachel Sennott; Olga Petsa; Sabrina Jalees; Caleb Hearon; Ennis Esmer; Dani Kind; Jason Jones
- Cinematography: Nina Djacic
- Edited by: Curt Lobb
- Music by: Aimee Bessada
- Production company: Barn 12
- Distributed by: Levelfilm
- Release dates: March 13, 2023 (SXSW); June 7, 2024 (Canada)
- Running time: 106 minutes
- Country: Canada
- Language: English
- Box office: $171,756

I Used to Be Funny is a 2023 Canadian independent comedy-drama film written and directed by Ally Pankiw. The film stars Rachel Sennott as Sam, a stand-up comedian living in Toronto who is struggling with depression that has impacted her career after Brooke (Olga Petsa), a young girl for whom she previously served as a nanny, goes missing. Sabrina Jalees, Caleb Hearon, Ennis Esmer, Dani Kind, and Jason Jones also star.

== Plot ==
Samantha "Sam" Cowell, a comedian and nanny in Toronto, is matched with a nannying job through an agency, through which she meets 12-year-old Brooke and her father, Cameron, whose wife is sick and in the hospital. Brooke is initially resistant to having a nanny, but Sam soon builds a relationship with her.

Two years later, Brooke has gone missing and Sam, struggling with PTSD, is no longer performing comedy. A series of flashbacks reveals the deterioration of Sam's relationship with Brooke and her family. As Sam and Brooke grow close, Sam becomes more enmeshed in the family. Cameron initially does not understand the appeal of Sam's comedy, but later appears to warm to it and shows his friends clips of her performances online, which include content around her dating and sex life. Brooke's mother dies, leading a grief-stricken Cameron to begin drinking in excess.

One night, as Sam is leaving to celebrate her anniversary with her boyfriend Noah, a drunk Cameron makes flirtatious advances toward Sam while referencing her comedy performances that describe her preferences for rough sex. When Sam rejects him, Cameron becomes increasingly aggressive, and the interaction culminates in him raping her. In shock after the assault, Sam wakes Brooke and claims there is a carbon monoxide leak to get her out of the house. Sam uses Cameron's car to drive away with Brooke, eventually pulling over to call the police.

At a court hearing, Cameron is convicted of raping Sam and sentenced to five years in prison. Resenting Sam for causing her to lose her father, Brooke visits Sam's house, where she throws a rock through the window and accuses her of lying about the assault. Shortly afterward, Brooke goes missing.

Sam returns to Brooke and Cameron's house, now abandoned as it has been sold. Inside, Sam finds Brooke's journal, in which Brooke has written a phone number for someone named Nathan. Sam calls the number, pretending to be a friend of Brooke's, and Nathan reveals his location. Sam leaves her roommates' party to locate Brooke in Niagara Falls and bring her back.

Sam finds Brooke intoxicated, and discovers that Nathan is a much older boy. Although Brooke and Nathan resist Sam, Sam pepper sprays Nathan, then takes Brooke back to the motel where she is staying. When Brooke sobers up, she is initially furious with Sam for ostensibly ruining her family, but eventually admits she is hurt by Sam abandoning her. The two reconcile. In the car ride home, Brooke says she has one more condition before they return. They stop in Niagara Falls, and Sam performs comedy once again.

== Cast ==
- Rachel Sennott as Sam Cowell
- Olga Petsa as Brooke Renner
- Jason Jones as Cameron Renner
- Sabrina Jalees as Paige
- Caleb Hearon as Philip
- Ennis Esmer as Noah
- Dani Kind as Jill
- Hoodo Hersi as Zara
- Dan Beirne as Tim
- Stephen Alexander as Nathan

== Release ==
I Used to Be Funny premiered at the 2023 South by Southwest Film & TV Festival on March 13, 2023, with Levelfilm acquiring distribution rights in Canada. It later screened at the Inside Out Film and Video Festival in May. That August, Utopia acquired distribution rights in the United States. At the 2023 Woodstock Film Festival, it screened on September 28 and October 1.

The film was released theatrically in the United States and in Canada on June 7, 2024, and on digital platforms on June 18.

== Reception ==
=== Critical response ===
On the review aggregator website Rotten Tomatoes, 83% of 60 critics' reviews are positive, with an average rating of 7.1/10. The website's consensus reads: "Bringing a droll edge to deeply serious subject matter, Ally Pankiw's feature length debut provides Rachel Sennott a welcome opportunity to display her dramatic range." Metacritic, which uses a weighted average, assigned the film a score of 74 out of 100, based on 13 critics, indicating "generally favorable" reviews.

Jason Bailey of The Playlist wrote that "the flashbacks are reasonably well-integrated, though it takes a few scenes to hook into what they're doing and where we are, and some of the stylistic devices to signal them are a little shopworn (there are copious echoing voices haunting the soundtrack). But the construction isn't entirely effective. It ends up unwinding like a thriller, carefully hiding not a killer, but a secret, a device that borders on deception and tips into that territory — particularly near the end, when the details they've been withholding are released as easy exposition dumps in flat, pro forma courtroom scenes."

For Exclaim!, Rachel Ho rated the film 7/10, writing that "Pankiw's use of mystery and thriller to build compelling tension shows a remarkable command over the tone of her film, particularly impressive in a first feature. Her confidence is evident as she reroutes and backtracks the story, going from point B to point A without losing focus."

Jake Kring-Schreifels of The Film Stage graded the film a B, writing that "to her screenplay's credit, Pankiw manages to avoid a full-on mystery. The worry in these kinds of movies is that the effort to obfuscate and hint at the heart of the problem doesn't pay off. But the reveal here is thoughtfully constructed (a courtroom scene shows the humiliating way jokes can be taken out of context to serve a prosecutor's favor) and further clarifies Brooke's decision to abandon her family. "Don't think about Euphoria," Phillip tells Sam before she begins a feverish, final hunt for Brooke. It's a humorous touch to this contemporary story about reconciling the past by taking control of the present, and using your gifts to get you out of the dark."

Peter Sobczynski of The Spool was more negative, writing that "Ultimately, I Used to Be Funny proves to be as aimless as its heroine, though nowhere near as interesting. It has ambitions, I suppose, but it doesn't know how to execute them. As a result, the feature kind of stumbles around before arriving at a finale nowhere near as cathartic as it would like. That said, Sennott is very good here. I cannot quite recommend that you see it. Still, hopefully, someone out there will catch her work here, realize her versatility, and give her a role in a project more deserving of her talents."

=== Awards and nominations ===
Award	Date of ceremony	Category	Subject	Result	Ref.
Inside Out 2SLGBTQ+ Film Festival Awards	June 2023	Audience Award for Best Narrative Feature	I Used to Be Funny	Won	
