= No Sinner =

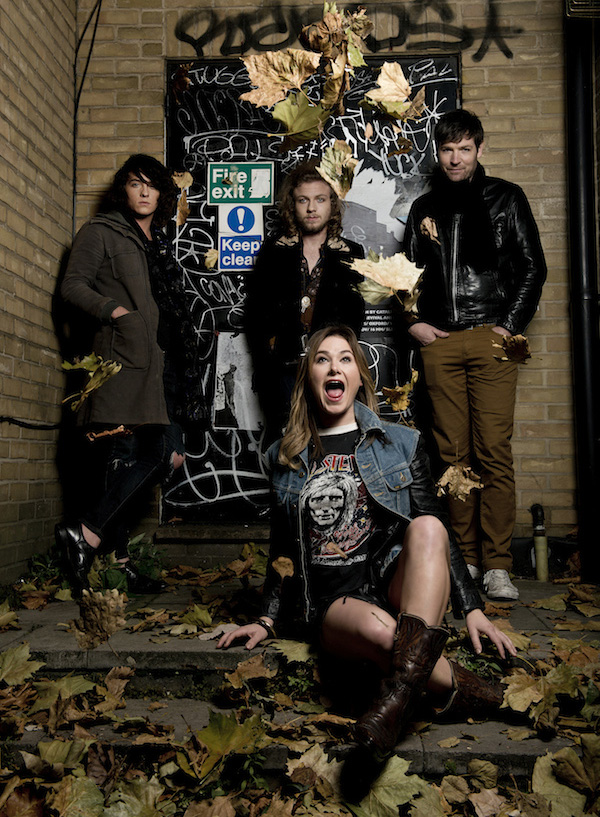

Background information
- Origin: Vancouver, British Columbia, Canada
- Genres: Blues rock
- Years active: 2012–2016
- Labels: Provogue Records
- Past members: Colleen Rennison; Eric Campbell; Ian Browne; Matt Camirand

No Sinner was a blues rock quartet based in Vancouver, British Columbia. The group was led by singer-songwriter Colleen Rennison—the band's name was her surname spelled backwards.

== History ==
After returning to her hometown of Vancouver from New York City, Rennison started a rotating back-up band to fill her weekly Thursday night performances at Guilt and Company, which was then a club in Vancouver's Gastown district. Among the musicians playing in the band were current bandmates Eric Campbell (guitar) and Ian Browne (drums). No Sinner released their six-track debut album Boo Hoo Hoo in 2012 on the Vancouver-based indie label First Love Records.

No Sinner later signed with Provogue Records, with whom they released Boo Hoo Hoo throughout North America. Following the release of their debut album, No Sinner went on a North American tour, during which they performed at South by Southwest and the WXPN Triple-A Non-Comm Convention.

Interviews and press coverage of the band appeared in Vice, Indie Shuffle, Classic Rock, Exclaim!. No Sinner also played festivals worldwide, including the UK's Dot to Dot Festival.

The band's second and final album, Old Habits Die Hard, was released in May 2016.

== Personnel ==
- Colleen Rennison - vocals
- Eric Campbell - guitar and backing vocals
- Ian Browne - drums
- Matt Camirand - bass

== Discography ==
- Boo Hoo Hoo (2014) (Provogue Records)
- Old Habits Die Hard (2016) (Mascot Music)
