= Colleen Rennison =

Canadian singer/songwriter and actress

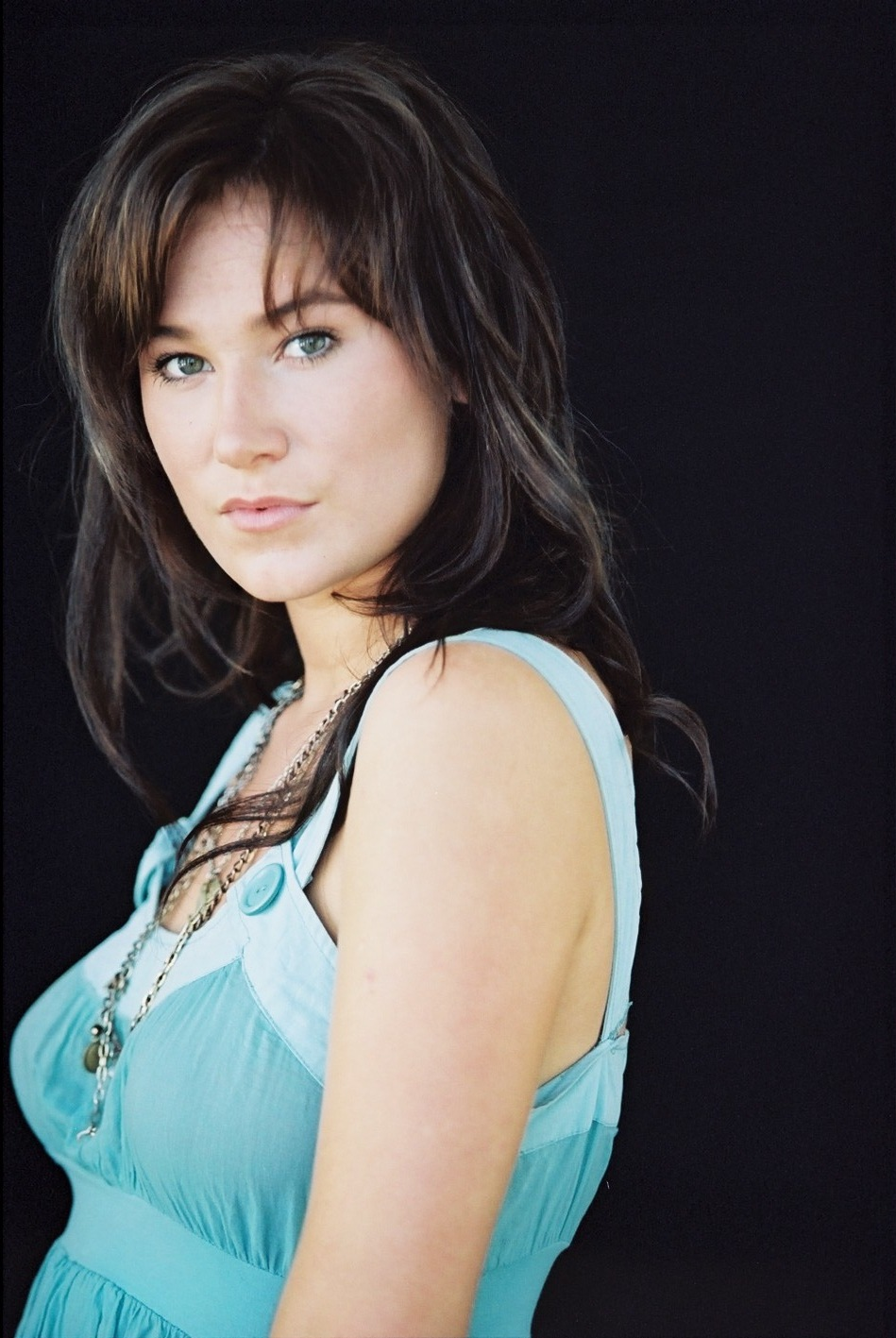
- Born: December 2, 1987 (age 38); Vancouver, British Columbia
- Occupation(s): Actress, singer, songwriter
- Years active: 1994–present

Colleen Rennison (born December 2, 1987) is a Canadian singer/songwriter and actress.

== Early life and education ==
Colleen Rennison is of Irish, Scottish and French descent. She was born to Pat, a mortgage underwriter, and Cecilia Rennison, a television researcher, and was raised in Vancouver, British Columbia.

== Career ==
In 1994, Rennison began her acting career with a role in the Canadian indie film Max (1994). This was closely followed by appearances in a handful of television movies and a guest-starring role on the television series The Outer Limits. Carpool (1996), starring Tom Arnold, David Paymer, and Rachael Leigh Cook, was her first major American feature.

Rennison then landed a role in the John Dahl-directed Unforgettable (1996), with Ray Liotta and Linda Fiorentino, followed by the first of two Stargate SG-1 appearances as "Ally" in the episode 'Bane' (1998; S02E10), with Richard Dean Anderson and Christopher Judge.

In The Story of Us (1999), directed by Rob Reiner and featuring Bruce Willis and Michelle Pfeiffer, Rennison portrayed their daughter Erin. Her next major role was playing Mona Hibbard as a young girl (Minnie Driver played the character as an adult) in the film Beautiful (2000), directed by Sally Field, also starring Joey Lauren Adams and Kathleen Turner.

Rennison continued to work on more Canadian projects such as the short lived but critically acclaimed These Arms of Mine for CBC, which landed her a Gemini Award nomination, and the Emmy Award winning casting director Coreen Mayrs' independent film A Feeling Called Glory (based on the short story The Presbyterian Sidewalk by Barbara Gowdy), for which Rennison won a Gemini in 2001, making her the youngest ever winner at 13. In 2005, Chris Haddock (of Canadian drama Da Vinci's Inquest), who was familiar with her work, hand selected her to play a variation of Kelly Ellard (convicted killer of Reena Virk) for a recurring role in Da Vinci's City Hall. Most recently Rennison has appeared in the films American Venus, Boot Camp, Down River, and What Goes Up. Rennison has also appeared in the television series Highlander: The Series, Poltergeist: The Legacy, Millennium, and The Sentinel.

For her second of two appearances on Stargate SG-1, in the episode "Rite of Passage" (2001; S05E06), Rennison was cast in a different role as "Cassandra", who had previously been played as a child by Katie Stuart in the episode "Singularity" (1997; S01E14).

In 2005, Rennison's mother submitted a recording of Rennison to CityTV, a local station holding a contest. Out of thousands of entries, she was selected along with two other girls to meet with Grammy Award-winning and multi-platinum-selling producer/composer/songwriter David Foster at his Malibu, California, home (featured on the reality television series Princes of Malibu with stepsons Brody Jenner and Brandon Jenner). This meeting led to a performance later that year at the David Foster and Friends Celebrity Gala to support The David Foster Foundation in Vancouver.

In 2008, Rennison relocated to New York City to begin training at the Circle in the Square Theatre in their two-year acting program, which she left halfway through after they refused to allow her into their musical theatre track because of her low range and untrained voice. While still in New York, she signed with a management team at Shady Records, but after six months terminated the relationship due to conflicting musical views.

After moving back home to Vancouver, she met Parker Bossley and began writing songs, which soon led to the formation of No Sinner, a rock/soul/blues outfit with drummer Ian Browne and guitarist Eric Campbell. Since the release of their debut EP, Boo Hoo Hoo, No Sinner has gained wide acclaim and national radio play, performing at music festivals across the country. Their first full-length album (also entitled Boo Hoo Hoo) was released in 2014, with a second album, Old Habits Die Hard, released in May 2016. She also released a solo album in 2014, entitled See the Sky About to Rain. Her next solo album, Persephone, was released in 2023.

== Personal life ==
Rennison splits her time between Vancouver, New York, and Los Angeles.

== Filmography ==
=== Film ===
Year	Title	Role	Notes
1994	Max	Sophie Blake	
1995	Dream Man	Sarah Reynolds	
1996	Unforgettable	Lindy Krane	
1996	Carpool	Chelsea	
1999	Mr. Rice's Secret	Molly	
1999	The Story of Us	Erin Jordan at Ten	
2000	Beautiful	Mona at 12	
2004	Part of the Game	Stoned Girl / Basketball Player	
2007	American Venus	Street Girl	
2008	Boot Camp	Ellen	
2009	What Goes Up	Sylvia	
2012	Cue the Muse	—	Documentary
2013	Down River	Harper	
2018	Kingsway	Lori	

=== Television ===
Year	Title	Role	Notes
1994	Sin & Redemption	Katie (age 5)	Television film
1994	Highlander: The Series	Robin	Episode: "Courage"
1995	University Hospital	Katie Adams	Episode: "You Can Run..."
1995, 2000	The Outer Limits	Young Girl / Jillian Rosman	2 episodes
1996–1999	Poltergeist: The Legacy	Miranda Rhodes / Senephra	5 episodes
1997	Out of Nowhere	Elizabeth	Television film
1997	Marie Curie: More Than Meets the Eye	Eliane Boudreau	Television film
1997	Millennium	Jessica Cayce	Episode: "19:19"
1998	The Sentinel	Rachel Johnson	Episode: "Neighborhood Watch"
1998, 2001	Stargate SG-1	Ally / Cassandra	2 episodes
2000–2001	These Arms of Mine	Sophie Bishop	3 episodes
2004	The Book of Ruth	Ruth	Television film
2005–2006	Da Vinci's City Hall	Katie	6 episodes
2016	Aftermath	Franny	Episode: "Madame Sosostris"
