= These Arms of Mine (TV series) =

Canadian television drama series

- Genre: Drama
- Created by: Phil Savath; Susan Duligal
- Written by: Phil Savath; Susan Duligal; Linda Coffey; Linda Svendsen
- Directed by: Stuart Margolin; John Pozer; Anne Wheeler; Scott Smith
- Starring: Alex Carter; Shauna MacDonald; Stuart Margolin; Conrad Coates; Babz Chula; Byron Lawson; Colleen Rennison
- Composer: Patric Caird
- Country of origin: Canada
- Original language: English
- No. of seasons: 1
- No. of episodes: 13

Production
- Executive producer: Phil Savath
- Producer: Teri Woods-McArter
- Production locations: Vancouver, British Columbia
- Production company: Forefront Entertainment

Original release
- Network: CBC Television
- Release: 2000 – 2001

These Arms of Mine is a Canadian drama television series that aired on CBC Television in the 2000-01 television season.

The show revolved around a group of professional friends in their 30s living in Vancouver, British Columbia. It centred on Alex Carter as photographer David Bishop and Shauna MacDonald as radio announcer Claire Monroe; the first episode centred on Claire's decision, after they had been in a long-distance relationship for more than a year, to move from her home in Toronto to live with David in Vancouver. The series was created by Phil Savath and Susan Duligal, based in part on their own early long-distance relationship prior to marrying in 1997.

The cast also included Stuart Margolin as Miles Rankin, a former American draft dodger running for Vancouver city council; Conrad Coates as Steven Armstrong, a gay drama teacher grieving the recent death of his partner to AIDS; Babz Chula as magazine editor Esme Price; Byron Lawson as her much younger restaurateur husband Amos Lee; and Colleen Rennison as Sophie, David's teenage daughter from his previous marriage.

The series was produced by Forefront Entertainment.

Chula won the Gemini Award for Best Actress in a Continuing Leading Dramatic Role at the 16th Gemini Awards in 2001.

The show was not a ratings success, and was not renewed for a second season.
