= Max (1994 film) =

- Directed by: Charles Wilkinson
- Written by: Charles Wilkinson
- Produced by: Armand Leo; Charles Wilkinson; Tobias Schliesser
- Starring: R. H. Thomson; Denise Crosby
- Cinematography: Tobias Schliessler
- Edited by: Lawrence Hugues
- Music by: Graeme Coleman
- Production company: Apple Pie Pictures
- Release date: August 30, 1994 (MWFF)
- Running time: 94 minutes
- Country: Canada
- Language: English

Max is a Canadian drama film, directed by Charles Wilkinson and released in 1994. The film centres on Max Blake (Fabio Wilkinson), a young boy with a serious medical condition whose parents Andy (R. H. Thomson) and Jayne (Denise Crosby) are in conflict about whether his health would be better served by living in the city to be near doctors and medical facilities, or in a rural area to be closer to nature and away from pollution and chemical exposure.

The cast also includes Colleen Rennison, Byron Chief-Moon, Robert Clothier, Jerry Wasserman and Gillian Barber.

The film premiered at the Montreal World Film Festival, and was subsequently screened at the 1994 Toronto International Film Festival.

Shari Ulrich, Graeme Coleman and David Graff received a Genie Award nomination for Best Original Song at the 15th Genie Awards, for the song "Every Road".
