= Here Today (film) =

- Theatrical release poster
- Directed by: Billy Crystal
- Written by: Billy Crystal; Alan Zweibel
- Produced by: Billy Crystal; Tiffany Haddish; Fred Bernstein; Alan Zweibel; Dominique Telson
- Starring: Billy Crystal; Tiffany Haddish; Penn Badgley; Laura Benanti; Louisa Krause
- Cinematography: Vanja Cernjul
- Edited by: Kent Beyda
- Music by: Charlie Rosen
- Production companies: Astute Films; Face Productions; Big Head Productions
- Distributed by: Stage 6 Films
- Release date: May 7, 2021 (United States)
- Running time: 117 minutes
- Country: United States
- Language: English
- Box office: $2.9 million

Here Today is a 2021 American comedy-drama film directed and produced by Billy Crystal, from a screenplay that he wrote with Alan Zweibel. It stars Crystal, Tiffany Haddish, Penn Badgley, Laura Benanti and Louisa Krause. The film was released on May 7, 2021, by Stage 6 Films.

== Plot ==
Charlie Burnz is walking to work, having to remind himself of the directions, demonstrating that his memory isn't strong. He arrives at the studio where he has a storied career as a successful comedy screenwriter. Later, sitting in on a pitch meeting, Charlie goes on a lunch date with someone who won it at an auction.

Meeting Emma Payge, she explains her cheating ex-boyfriend won the auction as Charlie is his hero. By taking his lunch date, she gets some revenge. They get on well but she has a severe allergic reaction to her shellfish. Accompanying her to the hospital, Emma claims Charlie is her adoptive dad. He gets stuck with the bill and later has to stab her with an Epi pen. He has enjoyed himself but doubts he will see her again.

Charlie meets with his physician Dr. Vidor, who talks of his early stage of dementia. He hasn't told his family nor his employer. That night, Charlie attends a recorded discussion of one of his most successful movies. Interviewed by Bob Costas with the film's director Barry Levinson and lead actors Sharon Stone and Kevin Kline, Charlie forgets the names of his fellow panelists, playing it off as a joke.

Afterwards, Charlie is surprised by Emma, who attends to support him, as she now genuinely likes him. She also repays him for the hospital visit. Charlie accompanies Emma to her job as a singer for a band and is very impressed by her talent. Afterwards, he explains the unfinished novel she saw is meant to be a memoir celebrating his life with his late wife Carrie and his children Rex and Francine. Charlie admits writer's block and also has a strained relationship with the kids.

The same night, Emma asks Charlie how he met Carrie in a message. This helps him focus and he begins to write his novel. In a flashback, Charlie and Carrie met by chance while walking on the same beach. After light conversation, he invites her to his house to remove tar from her feet. They hit it off, declaring their love for each other after a few dates. Later, Charlie has a breakdown when his route to work is blocked. Then, during a live show, he has an episode.

Angry at Roger, a cast member who can't enunciate properly, thereby ruining jokes with his poor performance, Charlie walks onstage. He critiques Roger and engages the crowd, the performance is lauded and goes viral. Although everyone initially thinks Charlie was simply engaged in brilliant improv, it soon becomes apparent that he is unwell. Emma rushes to the studio after seeing the live show, explaining Charlie's situation. Charlie's coworker Darrell Green writes a tribute to him online, providing cover for what happened. Meanwhile, Francine thinks Charlie was drunk and is disgusted.

Charlie’s granddaughter Lindsay arrives unexpectedly at his home while Emma is out. She tearfully explains that she overheard Francine blame Charlie for Carrie's death behind his back. He embraces Lindsay, saying he will take them somewhere special to cheer her up. When Francine finds Lindsay is missing, she and Rex go to Charlie's, finding Emma also looking for him. They soon realize he took a rideshare service, so they track him to the country.

As they all drive to him, Emma tells Rex and Francine about his dementia. They find Lindsay in tears as Charlie had an episode and ran into the woods without her. Realizing they are at their childhood cabin, Francine and Rex rush to find Charlie. He wholeheartedly apologizes for his past mistakes. The family tearfully embraces and forgives him and also accepts Emma as part of the family.

Forward in time, Charlie and Emma are at the cabin on Lake Charlie with Rex, Francine, Lindsay and Darrell. Francine and Rex reminisce about their childhood as Darrell transcribes the stories for the book. At the sunset, they all go together to the lake to watch it. Charlie sees Carrie's spirit watching it alongside them and smiles.

== Cast ==
- Billy Crystal as Charlie Burnz
- Tiffany Haddish as Emma Payge
- Penn Badgley as Rex Burnz
- Laura Benanti as Francine Burnz
- Louisa Krause as Carrie Burnz
- Anna Deavere Smith as Dr. Vidor
- Matthew Broussard as Roger
- Alex Brightman as Justin
- Andrew Durand as Darrell Green
- Max Gordon Moore as Brad
- Audrey Hsieh as Lindsay Burnz
- Nyambi Nyambi as Dwayne St. Johnson
- Brandon Uranowitz as Gary
- Sharon Stone as Herself / Iris
- Kevin Kline as Himself
- Barry Levinson as Himself
- Bob Costas as Himself
- Susan Pourfar as Paula

== Production ==
In September 2019, it was announced Tiffany Haddish and Billy Crystal would star in the film and serve as producers, while Crystal would also direct from a screenplay co-written with Alan Zweibel. In October 2019, Louisa Krause, Penn Badgley, Laura Benanti, Alex Brightman, Anna Deavere Smith and Nyambi Nyambi joined the cast of the film, with principal photography commencing in New York. Filming wrapped around Thanksgiving.

== Release ==
In April 2021, Stage 6 Films acquired distribution rights to the film and set it for a May 7, 2021, release.

The film was released during the COVID-19 pandemic in the United States, just 18 days after the final U.S. states had opened the national vaccination program to all residents aged 16 and over. For example, Regal Cinemas, the second largest theatre chain in the United States, was still phasing in the reopening of its theaters – a process that would take some weeks to complete.

== Reception ==
=== Box office ===
Here Today grossed $2.8 million domestically (United States and Canada) and $0.1 million in other territories, for a worldwide total of $2.9 million. It opened at No. 7 at the domestic box office, and spent two non-consecutive weeks in the Top 10.

=== Critical response ===
On the review aggregator website Rotten Tomatoes, 46% of 100 critics' reviews are positive, with an average rating of 5.3/10. The website's consensus reads: "Here Today's well-matched stars share an infectious chemistry that's almost enough to overcome a frequently mushy mix of comedy and drama." Metacritic, which uses a weighted average, assigned the film a score of 40 out of 100, based on 23 critics, indicating "mixed or average" reviews. According to PostTrak, 65% of audience members gave the film a positive score, with 46% saying they would definitely recommend it.

Writing for Variety, Owen Gleiberman called the film "both winning and mushy" and said: "What's good about the movie is that Crystal, who co-wrote and directed it, has an inside knowledge of the showbiz comedy world… the prickly vivacity with which he portrays it roots the movie in something real."
