= Olga Petsa =

Cypriot actress (born 2006)

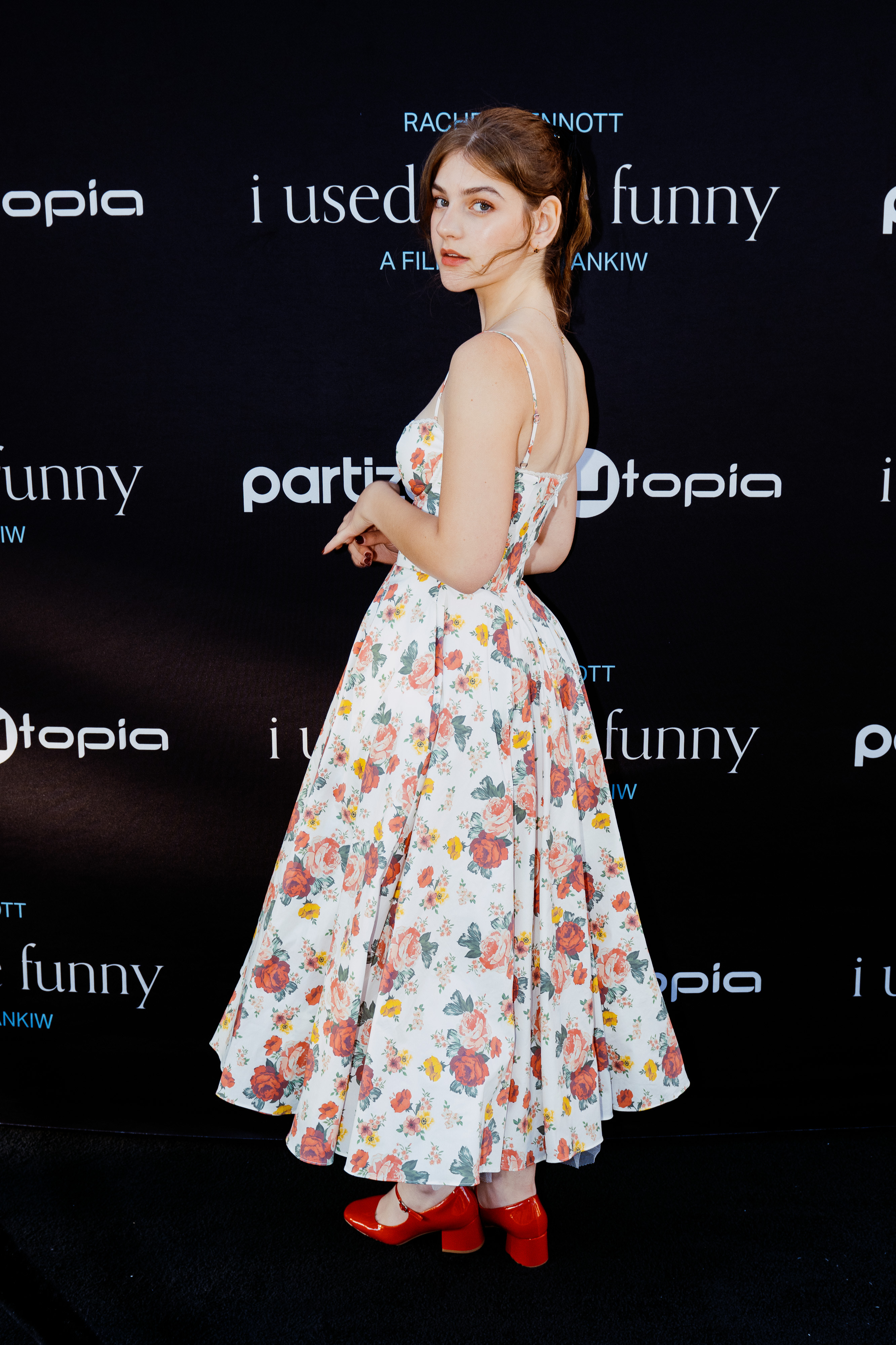
- Petsa in 2024
- Born: 28 July 2006 (age 20); Nicosia, Cyprus
- Occupation: Actress
- Years active: 2019–present

Olga Petsa (Greek: Όλγα Πέτσα, born 28 July 2006) is a Canadian actress. She is best known for playing Nicky in the comedy film Mixtape and Brooke Renner in the comedy drama I Used to Be Funny.

== Early life ==
Petsa was born in Nicosia, Cyprus to George and Maya Petsa. She moved with her family to Vancouver when she was 9 years old. She is fluent in Greek and Serbian.

== Career ==
Petsa's first big role was in the comedy film Mixtape. Her other big role so far was in the comedy drama I Used to Be Funny. Her next film role was playing Rena in the true crime film The 13th Wife: Escaping Polygamy. Her most recent role has been playing young Joan's friend in the fantasy romantic comedy film Eternity.

== Personal life ==
Her favourite films are Good Will Hunting and French Kiss while her favourite television series is The Mentalist. She is a fan of the football club Real Madrid and her favourite player is Cristiano Ronaldo. Her brother Frixos is a professional footballer.

== Filmography ==
=== Film ===
| Year | Title | Role | Notes |
|---|---|---|---|
| 2019 | Twitch | Dominique | Short |
| 2019 | Daisy | Daisy | Short |
| 2021 | Mixtape | Nicky | |
| 2023 | I Used to Be Funny | Brooke Renner | |
| 2025 | The 13th Wife: Escaping Polygamy, Parts 1 & 2 | Rena | |

=== Television ===
| Year | Title | Role | Notes |
|---|---|---|---|
| 2025 | Black Mirror | Goth Chick | Episode; Common People |
| 2025 | Resident Alien | Teenage D'arcy | Episode; Truth Hurts |
| 2026 | Crew Girl | Juliet Morny | |
