= Kongōji-san wa Mendōkusai =

Japanese manga series by Minoru Toyoda

- First tankōbon volume cover

金剛寺さんは面倒臭い
- Genre: Romantic comedy
- Manga
- Written by: Minoru Toyoda
- Published by: Shogakukan
- Magazine: Monthly Shōnen Sunday
- Original run: September 12, 2017 – July 10, 2020
- Volumes: 7
- icon

Kongōji-san wa Mendōkusai (Japanese: 金剛寺さんは面倒臭い; lit. 'Kongōji is Annoying') is a Japanese manga series written and illustrated by Minoru Toyoda. Originally a one-shot published in Shogakukan's shōnen manga magazine Monthly Shōnen Sunday in April 2016, it was serialized in the same magazine from September 2017 to July 2020, with its chapters collected in seven tankōbon volumes.

== Publication ==
Written and illustrated by Minoru Toyoda, Kongōji-san wa Mendōkusai was first published as a one-shot in Shogakukan's shōnen manga magazine Monthly Shōnen Sunday on April 12, 2016. It was later serialized in the same magazine from September 12, 2017, to July 10, 2020. Shogakukan collected its chapters in seven tankōbon volumes, released from March 12, 2018, to September 11, 2020.

=== Volumes ===
No.	Japanese release date	Japanese ISBN
1	March 12, 2018	978-4-09-128208-8
2	August 9, 2018	978-4-09-128470-9
3	January 11, 2019	978-4-09-128822-6
4	July 12, 2019	978-4-09-129339-8
5	December 12, 2019	978-4-09-129527-9
6	May 12, 2020	978-4-09-850123-6
7	September 11, 2020	978-4-09-850257-8

== Reception ==
Kongōji-san wa Mendōkusai ranked second, behind Heavenly Delusion, on Takarajimasha's Kono Manga ga Sugoi! 2019 ranking of top 20 manga series for male readers. The series was nominated for the 12th Manga Taishō in 2019, and placed seventh with 39 points.

== See also ==
- Draw This, Then Die!, another manga series by the same author
- Love Roma, another manga series by the same author
