= Bet (TV series) =

Netflix Canadian television series

- Genre: Thriller; Teen drama Psychological drama Murder mystery
- Based on: Kakegurui by: Homura Kawamoto; Tōru Naomura
- Developed by: Simon Barry
- Starring: Miku Martineau; Ayo Solanke; Eve Edwards; Clara Alexandrova; Hunter Cardinal; Anwen O'Driscoll; Aviva Mongillo; Ryan Sutherland
- Composer: Kalaisan Kalaichelvan
- Country of origin: Canada
- Original language: English
- No. of seasons: 1
- No. of episodes: 10

Production
- Executive producers: Simon Barry; Jeff F. King; David Fortier; Ivan Schneeberg; Nick Nantell; Jon Rutherford
- Producer: Michael Bawcutt
- Cinematography: David A. Makin; James Klopko
- Editors: Aren Hansen; Simone Smith; Cameron Nixdorf
- Running time: 30–37 minutes
- Production company: Boat Rocker Studios

Original release
- Network: Netflix
- Release: May 15, 2025 – present

Bet is a 2025 English-language Canadian murder mystery teen drama psychological thriller television series for Netflix. The series is a loose adaptation of the Japanese manga Kakegurui – Compulsive Gambler by Homura Kawamoto and Tōru Naomura. It premiered on May 15, 2025, with all ten episodes of the first season released simultaneously. Developed by Simon Barry, the show stars Miku Martineau as Yumeko, a transfer student at an elite boarding school governed by high-stakes gambling. In June 2025, the series was renewed for a second season.

== Premise ==
The series follows Yumeko, a skilled gambler who challenges the established hierarchy and the school's power structure at St. Dominic's Prep, an exclusive private boarding school where underground gambling dictates the social order. The students with the Top 10 gains from gambling are a part of the Student Council, and those who remain in the spots at the end of term get to go to a retreat with the board of school governors, who are mostly the parents of those consistently in the Council. The bottom of the ranking and those in debt become 'House Pets,' and are forced to do menial or humiliating tasks for students to whom they are indebted. Yumeko, with the help of students Mary, Ryan and Michael, is motivated to get into this ranking to figure out which of the governors killed her parents, after discovering that all were in the 'Kakegurui Club.'

== Cast and characters ==
=== Main ===
- Miku Martineau as Yumeko Kamamoto

A transfer student from Japan who arrives at St. Dominic's to avenge the death of her parents. She is the counterpart to Yumeko Jabami. (Note: The majority of the characters in Bet are considered analogues to Kakegurui characters, and as such, are seen as separate interpretations and not direct portrayals.)

- Ayo Solanke as Ryan Adebayo

The counterpart to Ryota Suzui. He has a crush on Yumeko, and generally goes to great lengths to protect her.

- Eve Edwards as Mary Davis.

The counterpart to Mary Saotome. She is kicked from the Top 10 and therefore the Student Council by Yumeko, and spends the season begrudgingly helping her in an attempt to regain her own spot.

- Clara Alexandrova as Kira Timurov.

The counterpart to Kirari Momobami. The President of the Student Council and the daughter of the leader of the Board of Governors, she's determined to keep a grip on her own power and impress her parents. She's also the half-sister of Riri through her father, who was in the Kakeguri Club.

- Hunter Cardinal as Michael.

An original character created for the series. He is the son of a member of the Kakegurui Club, unbeknownst to Yumeko, and his father shares a name with the only lead Yumeko has on who may have been responsible for her parents' deaths. He helps Yumeko as best as he can, but secretly takes efforts to foil her plans to revenge kill and to reach the Top 10.

- Anwen O'Driscoll as Riri Timurov

The counterpart to Ririka Momobami. Riri is the Vice-President of the Student Council and the half-sister of Kira, through their father Ivan.

- Aviva Mongillo as Dori Ahlstrom.

The counterpart to Midari Ikishima. A deranged and violent member of the Student Council who has a crush on Michael and will do anything for him. She's aware that her brutal tendencies hinder her ability to socialise, which only makes her more unstable.

- Ryan Sutherland as Suki Hennessey.

The counterpart to Itsuki Sumeragi. A social media influencer on the Student Council who is obsessed with beauty and perfection.

- Dorian Giordano as Chad White.

The counterpart to Kaede Manyuda. A member of the Student Council with an incredibly high libido, who is flirtatious but less strategic than the other Top 10.

- Laura Afelskie as Runa Von Ludwig.

The counterpart to Runa Yomozuki. A member of the Student Council who always wears animal themed hoodies, and who collects her debts in violent ways with the use of thugs.

- Emma Elle Patterson as Blake Samuels.

An original character created for the series. Yumeko's roommate when she moves in to St Dominic's, who plays the bass clarinet.

=== Recurring ===
- Jay Yoo as Jo Jabami, Yumeko's father and an ex-member of the Kakegurui Club.
- Emily Shelton as Keiko Jabami, Yumeko's mother and an ex-member of the Kakegurui Club.
- Christine Okuda Hara as Mrs. Kawamoto, Yumeko's guardian and mentor after her parents are killed.
- Rami Khan as Rex, Suki's House Pet and assistant.
- James Burke as Raymond Rowe, Blake's stepfather and the man Yumeko initially believes to have killed her parents.
- Alex Hook as Becky
- Piyal Sarker as Kylie
- Noam Jenkins as Gabriel Adams, Michael's father, an ex-member of the Kakegurui club and a School Governor.
- Krista Bridges as Katrina Timurov, Kira's mother.
- Peter Outerbridge as Arkadi Timurov, Kira and Riri's father, the head of the School Board, and an ex-member of the Kakegurui club.

=== Guest ===
- Seth Rollins as himself, and Runa's hired muscle to take back unpaid debts.

== Episodes ==
No.	Title	Directed by	Written by	Original release date
1	"Game On"	Simon Barry	Simon Barry	May 15, 2025
2	"Icebreaker"	Simon Barry	Amanda Fahey	May 15, 2025
3	"First Blood"	Jacquie Gould	Tabia Lau	May 15, 2025
4	"The Recital"	Jacquie Gould	Story by : Kurt Mungal; Teleplay by : Simon Barry & Kurt Mungal	May 15, 2025
5	"House Wars"	Joyce Wong	Ashley Park	May 15, 2025
6	"The Bet Gala"	Joyce Wong	Chris Roberts	May 15, 2025
7	"The Hunt"	Craig Wallace	Laura Good	May 15, 2025
8	"The Speakeasy"	Craig Wallace	Amanda Fahey & Laura Good	May 15, 2025
9	"Meet the Parents"	Simon Barry	Chris Roberts	May 15, 2025
10	"Winner Takes All"	Simon Barry	Simon Barry	May 15, 2025

== Production ==
The series was announced in May 2024 when Netflix commissioned an English-language adaptation of the Japanese manga Kakegurui, with Simon Barry serving as showrunner and Boat Rocker Studios serving as a production company. Filming took place in Toronto, Canada. Barry stated that the creative team aimed to capture the spirit of the original manga while crafting a unique narrative suited for a Western audience. Virtual Production should shots were produced at Dark Slope Studios. In June 2025, Netflix renewed the series for a second season.

== Reception ==
Bet received mixed reviews from critics and audiences. Some praised the series for its stylized visuals and performances, particularly Martineau's portrayal of Yumeko. However, others criticized it for deviating from the source material and lacking depth in storytelling. Variety criticized Bet for its "many missteps", calling the adaptation "wholly unnecessary" due to the prior existence of a Japanese-produced live-action drama adaptation already available on Netflix alongside two live-action films tying into the series.

Bet also faced backlash in pre-release for its casting choices, with some Kakegurui fans accusing it of "Asian erasure" due to the predominantly non-Asian cast and the change in setting from Japan in the original manga, a common criticism of Western adaptations of Asian media. In particular, this criticism of western manga and anime adaptations includes those made by the show's streaming service Netflix, such as the film adaptation of Death Note. During this period, the official trailer for the first season of Bet garnered over 100,000 dislikes on YouTube.

== Viewership ==
According to data from Showlabs, Bet ranked tenth on Netflix in the United States during the week of 19–25 May 2025.

== See also ==
- List of Netflix original programming
