= Honor Society (film) =

2022 film by Oran Zegman

- Official release poster
- Directed by: Oran Zegman
- Written by: David A. Goodman
- Produced by: Don Dunn; Ron French; Fred D. Lee; Michael Lewen; Syrinthia Studer
- Starring: Angourie Rice; Gaten Matarazzo; Christopher Mintz-Plasse
- Cinematography: Topher Osborn
- Edited by: Anita Brandt-Burgoyne
- Music by: Daniel Markovich; Ben Zeadman
- Production companies: Awesomeness Films; Guardian Pictures
- Distributed by: Paramount+
- Release date: July 29, 2022
- Running time: 97 minutes
- Country: United States
- Language: English

Honor Society is a 2022 American coming-of-age comedy film directed by Oran Zegman, written by David A. Goodman, and starring Angourie Rice, Gaten Matarazzo, and Christopher Mintz-Plasse.

It was released on Paramount+ on July 29, 2022, to positive reviews from critics, with praise for the performances of Rice, Matarazzo, and Mintz-Plasse.

== Plot ==
Honor Rose is an ambitious senior at George H. W. Bush High School who has dedicated her entire academic career to being accepted into Harvard University, hoping to escape her mediocre middle-class life. Part of this plan involves earning a letter of recommendation from her guidance counselor, Mr. Calvin. Calvin is a musician with an inappropriate crush on Honor but has connections to Harvard, so Honor remains close to him. He tells her that she, along with three other students, are in consideration for his letter of recommendation. She quickly deduces who they are: star athlete Travis Biggins, creative introvert Kennedy Park, and the awkward but academically brilliant nerd Michael Dipnicky. Honor resolves to eliminate all of them from contention with the help of friends Emma and Talia.

Honor's plan begins when she joins the theatre club and persuades them to put on a production of Kennedy's play about Mary I of England, hoping the project will distract Kennedy and cause her grades to sink. Honor also persuades Travis to join the production, hoping to sabotage his athletic prestige and push him into pursuing his closeted crush on one of the actors. Her plan to take down Michael is to make him infatuated with her and unable to focus on studies. One day in chemistry class, Honor becomes his lab partner and invites him to her house for study sessions. During their first study session, Honor tries to distract Michael by dressing scantily and insincerely flirting with him, but Michael ends up charming her instead with his kindness and their mutual interest in The Handmaid's Tale. Honor eventually proposes studying at Michael's house next time, but he is hesitant. She soon discovers that this is because Michael lives in foster care.

Honor's increasing attraction to Michael is fully realized when they sneak into a fancy house after school, where they kiss. The midterms arrive and Kennedy's and Travis's grades both slip due to their involvement in the play. Honor, while taking her midterm, decides to answer questions incorrectly so Michael's grades are the highest out of the four in consideration for the recommendation letter after deciding that he deserves the letter more than her. After the midterm, they kiss and start a relationship which culminates in Honor publicly kissing him, shocking her classmates. She also begins to genuinely enjoy the theatre club and making real bonds with Kennedy and Travis. Calvin also starts to make stronger sexual advances to Honor, even going as far to sexually proposition her for the Harvard recommendation, an offer she refuses.

One day, Michael texts her during lunch, saying he is alone at home. Honor goes to Michael's foster home and discovers he does not live there, but at the fancy house which they had "snuck into" earlier. Honor discovers that Michael is not only very well off, but just as manipulative as she is. He reveals that he duped her the entire time from when they first started talking, planning to get Honor to fall in love with him so she would concede the Harvard recommendation to him. A shocked and heartbroken Honor breaks up with Michael and leaves. Kennedy's production is performed and is received extremely well, and Honor finds herself as a genuine friend to the whole club, having helped Kennedy come out of her shell and Travis to publicly come out.

Deciding to make one last move in the race for the recommendation, she goes to Calvin's office just as Michael is about to receive it. Playing a recording of one of Calvin's sexual propositions, Honor blackmails him into giving the recommendation to Kennedy over Michael. She then decides to enjoy the rest of her senior year, unsure of her future but happy with her new friends and newly appreciative of her life as a whole.

== Cast ==
- Angourie Rice as Honor Rose
- Gaten Matarazzo as Michael Dipnicky
- Christopher Mintz-Plasse as Mr. Calvin
- Armani Jackson as Travis Biggins
- Amy Keum as Kennedy Park
- Ben Jackson Walker as Gary
- Kelcey Mawema as Talia
- Avery Konrad as Emma
- Michael P. Northey as Marvin Rose
- Kerry Butler as Janet Rose
- Andres Collantes as Diesel
- Danny Wattley as Coach Biggins
- Candice Hunter as Ms. Felson
- Arghavan Jenati as Lily Chugani
- Miku Martineau as Christine
- Jason Sakaki as Brad
- Zoë Christie as Grace
- Matreya Monro as Ms. Dipnicky

== Production ==
In January 2022, the film was greenlit, with production taking place in Vancouver.

== Reception ==
=== Viewership ===
Over its first week of release, Honor Society was the most-watched title on Paramount+.

=== Critical response ===
On the review aggregator website Rotten Tomatoes, 85% of 20 critics' reviews are positive, with an average rating of 6.60/10. On Metacritic, the film has a weighted average score of 66 out of 100, based on six critics, indicating "generally favorable" reviews.

Glenn Kenny of The New York Times wrote, "[Honor Society] comes out of the gate flashing a formal and thematic sophistication so dazzling it might take you a while to realize it’s actually a Young Adult movie." John Anderson of The Wall Street Journal wrote, "Reassuringly -- and very entertainingly -- Ms. Rice makes all of Honor’s plotting palatable, even charming, and her jaded worldview is not totally unreasonable." Tomris Laffly of Variety called it, "A surprisingly compelling high school caper conceived with youthful wit, aplomb and a genuinely out-of-left-field twist."
