= Crew Girl =

Canadian television series

- Promotional poster
- Genre: Sports drama Teen drama Coming-of-age
- Developed by: Vivian Lin; Morwyn Brebner
- Starring: Miku Martineau; Samuel Braun; Kyle Clark; Thomas Cadrot; Connor Paton; Jessica Paré
- Composer: Adam King
- Country of origin: Canada
- Original language: English
- No. of seasons: 1
- No. of episodes: 8

Production
- Executive producers: Vivian Lin; Morwyn Brebner; Jeff Norton; Lindsay Macadam; Hillary Zwick Turner; Tony Chung; Lori Massini; Matthew Hornburg; Mark J.W. Bishop; Jennifer McCarron; Donna Luke; Michael MacMillan
- Producers: Jason Fischer; Lindsay Macadam
- Cinematography: Bradley S. Creasser
- Editors: Lara Mazur; Mark Shearer; Christopher A. Smith; Jon Anctil
- Running time: 40–45 minutes
- Production companies: Blue Ant Studios; Great Pacific Media

Original release
- Network: Netflix
- Release: September 10, 2026 – present

Crew Girl is a Canadian coming-of-age sports teen drama television series starring Miku Martineau, Kyle Clark, and Samuel Braun. It premiered on Netflix on September 10, 2026 and was renewed for a second season.

== Premise ==
Teagan (Miku Martineau) is living in California with her parents. She is a talented teenage rower who races in a single scull, enthusiastically supported by her wealthy father. She and her mother are forced to relocate to her mother's childhood home in Eagle's Cove, Massachusetts after Teagan's father abandons them to become a fugitive from justice and all of his assets are seized. Teagan enrolls in a local private school because it offers rowing as a sport, but she quickly learns that there is no girls' rowing program, as the school has only been coeducational for two years. With no previous experience in the role, she becomes the coxswain of the chaotic crew of the boys' varsity Eight in order to maintain her involvement in the sport.

== Cast and characters ==
=== Main ===
- Miku Martineau as Teagan Tao
- Samuel Braun as Josh Regis, a rower in the varsity Eight and Ryder's cousin
- Kyle Clark as Cam Dillinger, a rower in the varsity Eight
- Thomas Cadrot as Coach Matt Hayden
- Connor Paton as Ryder Regis, a rower in the varsity Eight and Josh's cousin
- Jessica Paré as Ella Emerson-Tao, Teagan’s mother

=== Recurring ===
- Olga Petsa as Juliet Morny
- Sage Linder as Britney Garner, Josh's girlfriend
- Jude Wilson as Baloo Garner, a rower in the varsity Eight and Britney's brother
- Riley Davis as Noah Bainbridge, a rower in the varsity Eight
- Connor Wong as Perry Chou, a rower in the varsity Eight
- Jarrett Carlington as Chris "Crab Catcher" Padmore, a rower in the varsity Eight
- Vincent Muller as Damon Quaid, a rower in the varsity Eight
- Niall Matter as Richard Regis, Josh's father
- Tyler Roberge as Logan, a rower in the varsity Eight of a different school
- Hana Huggins as Madison, coach Hayden's daughter

=== Guest ===
- Alaska Leigh as Amber
- Aiden Howard as Liam, the incumbent coxswain of the varsity Eight who is displaced by Teagan
- Byron Lawson as David Tao, Teagan's father
- Lucia Walters as DeeDee Garner
- Amber Lewis as Karina, Ryder's mother
- Sara Canning as Imogen, Josh's mother

=== Special guest ===
- Kesha as herself

== Episodes ==
No.	Title	Directed by	Written by	Original release date
1	"The Catch"	Simon Barry	Vivian Lin & Morwyn Brebner	September 10, 2026
2	"The Hateful Eight"	Jacquie Gould	Jennica Harper	September 10, 2026
3	"Flight Crew"	Norman Buckley	Julian Doucet	September 10, 2026
4	"True Rowmance"	Amanda Tapping	Vivian Lin	September 10, 2026
5	"Anatomy of a Fall Formal"	Alysse Leite-Rogers	Marque Franklin-Williams	September 10, 2026
6	"Bad Break"	Adam Kane	Amber Alexander	September 10, 2026
7	"Under Pressure"	Amanda Tapping	Jennica Harper & Jason Ip	September 10, 2026
8	"O Coxswain, My Coxswain"	Norman Buckley	Vivian Lin	September 10, 2026

== Production ==
=== Development ===
The series is developed by Vivian Lin and Morwyn Brebner, and is produced by Great Pacific Media and Blue Ant Studios. Lin is series writer, executive producer and showrunner. Matthew Hornburg, Mark J.W. Bishop, Jennifer McCarron, Donna Luke, and Michael MacMillan serve as executive producers for Blue Ant Studios. Other executive producers include Jeff Norton, Lindsay Macadam, Hillary Zwick Turner, Tony Chung, and Lori Massini. The producers of the series are Macadam and Jason Fischer. Simon Barry directed the pilot episode.

In September 2026, it was reported that the series was renewed for a second season.

=== Casting ===
The cast is led by Miku Martineau, Jessica Paré, Samuel Braun, Kyle Clark, and Thomas Cadrot, as well as Jude Wilson, Connor Paton, Sage Linder, Alaska Leigh and Olga Petsa. For the roles the cast had rowing training, including sessions with Olympic gold-medal-winning coxswain Terry Paul.

=== Filming ===
Filming took place in British Columbia, including Victoria and Sidney on Vancouver Island. Rowing scenes were shot on Elk/Beaver Lake Regional Park and the Gorge Waterway with Hatley Castle used as the site of the fictional school. For the filming of rowing races the production used a floating camera barge capable of towing the actors' boat for close-up shots with drone photography used for when the cast rowed independently.

== Release ==
The series premiered on Netflix on September 10, 2026.

== Reception ==
The review aggregator website Rotten Tomatoes reported a 75% approval rating based on 16 reviews.
