= Byron Lawson =

Canadian actor

- Born: August 26, 1976 (age 50); Vancouver, British Columbia, Canada
- Occupation: Actor
- Years active: 1995–present

Byron Lawson (born August 26, 1976) is a Canadian actor of Chinese descent. He portrayed gangster Eddie Kim in the 2006 film Snakes on a Plane.

His past credits have included the television series These Arms of Mine, as well as episodes of Highlander: The Series, Andromeda, Alienated, Killer Instinct and Godiva's. He also had a supporting role in ABC Family's Fallen miniseries. He played the head of security in the post-apocalypse series Jeremiah. He played a role in ABC Family's Samurai Girl.

== Filmography ==
Year	Title	Role	Notes
1999	These Arms of Mine	Amos Lee	TV series, 5 episodes
2002	Jeremiah	Lee Chen	TV series, 17 episodes
2005	Killer Instinct	Detective Lee	TV series, 3 episodes
2006	Snakes on a Plane	Eddie Kim	feature film
2006	Fallen	Kushiel	TV mini-series
2008	Samurai Girl	Tough	TV mini-series
2009	Knights of Bloodsteel	Envoy	TV mini-series, 2 of 3 episodes
2009	A Dangerous Man	Mao	feature film
2010	Bloodletting & Miraculous Cures	Karl	TV mini-series, 4 of 8 episodes
2011	True Justice	Kuan-Yin	TV series, 2 episodes
2013	The Tomorrow People	Ultra Agent	TV series, 4 episodes
2014	Outcast	Captain Peng	feature film
2026	Crew Girl	David Tao	TV series, 3 episodes
