= Killer Instinct (TV series) =

Television show filmed in Vancouver

- Also known as: Deviant Behavior; The Gate
- Genre: Crime drama
- Created by: Josh Berman
- Starring: Johnny Messner; Kristin Lehman; Chi McBride
- Composer: Mark Morgan
- Country of origin: United States
- Original language: English
- No. of seasons: 1
- No. of episodes: 13

Production
- Executive producers: Ed Zuckerman; Charlie Craig
- Running time: 42 minutes
- Production companies: Fox Television Studios; Regency Television

Original release
- Network: Fox
- Release: September 23 – December 2, 2005

Killer Instinct is an American crime drama television series filmed in Vancouver that originally aired on the Fox Network. The pilot episode aired on September 23, 2005, and the final episode aired on December 2, 2005.

Fox ordered 13 episodes, only nine of which were broadcast in the United States; the remaining four premiered in the UK on Five, then on Universal HD. The series has also been broadcast in France, New Zealand, Croatia, Italy, Netherlands, Australia, Japan, and Poland.

== Premise ==
Johnny Messner plays Detective Jack Hale of the San Francisco Police Department. Hale has a history of causing tension in whatever department to which he is assigned, as much for his abrasive nature towards co-workers as the direct and sometimes unsettling manner in which he conducts investigations. Hale's reputation is also worsened by the infamy of his father, a self-confessed serial killer currently serving life in prison. The gruesome nature of his father's crimes combined with Hale's attitude has led many of his co-workers to wonder if he will one day become a serial killer himself, a fear which Hale secretly shares. Nonetheless, this strong familiarity with serial killers leads to Hale being recruited by the Deviant Crimes Unit.

The Deviant Crimes Unit's mission is to track down the perpetrators of unusual crimes within the city. Each new crime spree is investigated by the head of the unit, Lieutenant Matt Cavanaugh (Chi McBride), who judges whether the crime is "deviant" enough to be investigated by the DCU. In addition to Hale and Cavanaugh, the DCU employs Detective Danielle Carter (Kristin Lehman), whose analytical nature clashes both with the impulsive Hale and the subjective nature of their shared mission.

== Cast ==
=== Main cast ===
- Johnny Messner as Det. Jack Hale
- Marguerite Moreau as Det. Ava Lyford ("Pilot" only)
- Kristin Lehman as Det. Danielle Carter (episode two onward)
- Chi McBride as Lt. Matt Cavanaugh

=== Recurring cast ===
- Ramon De Ocampo as Harry Oka
- Jessica Steen as Dr. Francine Klepp
- Benita Ha as Riley
- Byron Lawson as Det. Lee
- Adam Reid as Boze

== Episodes ==
| No. | Title | Directed by | Written by | Original release date | Prod. code | U.S. viewers (millions) |
|---|---|---|---|---|---|---|
| 1 | "Pilot" | Robert Lieberman | Josh Berman | September 23, 2005 | CBW179 | 5.17 |
After taking a leave of absence following the death of his partner, Detective Jack Hale returns to duty to investigate the deaths of young women, paralyzed by spider bites before being killed in their beds.
| 2 | "Five Easy Pieces" | Bryan Spicer | Luke Schelhass | September 30, 2005 | CBW101 | 4.48 |
After discovering his partner was not an actual detective but a Justice agent sent to examine if he's psychologically up to his task, SFPD Detective Jack Hale is understandably suspicious about her again female successor. Danielle Carter asked for a transfer from forensics, but Jack soon finds her useful, focused and knowledgeable. Their first case starts with a former artist whose eyes were cut out after a successful transplant cured her blindness. Her ex-boyfriend still has a shrine of pictures devoted to her, but isn't the violent type. After the next victim is found missing a kidney, also recently transplanted, it turns out there are nine others recipients of organs from the same donor. They may all be at risk as the killer either targets the organs or symbolical revenge on the donor, who indeed has a long rep sheet, but Jack concentrates on his non-conviction-charges.
| 3 | "13 Going on 30" | James A. Contner | Carla Kettner | October 7, 2005 | CBW103 | 4.95 |
After a little girl is picked up by a sex offender, Hale and Danielle are called to investigate his murder. As they hunt for the missing girl, more known sex offenders show up dead.
| 4 | "O Brother, Where Art Thou" | Bryan Spicer | Ed Zuckerman | October 21, 2005 | CBW104 | 4.30 |
Twin sisters are strangled in their beds, in different apartments, in exactly the same way and their sister describes a man she saw near one of the apartments. The trouble is that the suspect she fingers, a convicted felon, is a patient in a state mental hospital. Meanwhile, Cavanaugh's 18-year-old daughter has her own trouble with the law, and Cavanaugh must decide whether he should use his influence to fix it.
| 5 | "Die Like an Egyptian" | David Straiton | Erin Maher & Kay Reindl | October 28, 2005 | CBW102 | 4.31 |
As Detective Danielle Carter learns more about the definition of a deviant crime, she and Hale continue to forge their relationship as partners, and despite Hale's best efforts, he is beginning to warm to her. Meanwhile, Hale and Carter are thrust into the dark underworld of Egyptian mythology as bizarre crimes involving ancient hieroglyphs and rituals have the D.C.U. on a hunt for one person's quest for the impossible.
| 6 | "Who's Your Daddy" | James A. Contner | Charlie Craig | November 4, 2005 | CBW105 | 4.61 |
On his birthday, twenty years after his serial killer father's arrest, Hale is called to a crime scene with a body that echoes his father's work. To solve the case he must come face to face with the man he has avoided for so long.
| 7 | "Game Over" | John Kretchmer | Carla Kettner | November 11, 2005 | CBW106 | 3.86 |
Ray races to get his family out of the house when a man shows up and pulls a gun on him. 36 hours earlier, Hale and Carter investigate the case of a woman killed in a processed crime scene, which may be connected to a violent video game.
| 8 | "Forget Me Not" | Michael Grossman | Kam Miller | November 18, 2005 | CBW107 | 3.34 |
Hale and Carter catch a break in a serial killer case when one of the victims survives his attack, trouble is, he can't remember anything, and the woman he was attacked with, isn't who she's supposed to be.
| 9 | "Shake, Rattle and Roll" | Bryan Spicer | Luke Schelhass & Charles Murray | December 2, 2005 | CBW108 | 4.10 |
The detectives investigate the case of men apparently being willingly sacrificed at the epicenter of small earthquakes across the city.
| 10 | "She's the Bomb" | Vincent Misiano | Carla Kettner | Unaired | CBW109 | N/A |
A bride explodes on her wedding day right in front of Carter, causing Hale to have to grudgingly work with the bomb squad to find the bomber before he strikes again.
| 11 | "While You Were Sleeping" | Bryan Spicer | Erin Maher & Kay Reindl | Unaired | CBW110 | N/A |
Hale and Carter investigate a series of bizarre deaths in and around a college sleep clinic.
| 12 | "Love Hurts" | Chris Grismer | Carla Kettner | Unaired | CBW111 | N/A |
The detectives investigate the case of a man who was shot with a crossbow, before crashing his car and having his head chopped off.
| 13 | "Fifteen Minutes of Flame" | Tim Matheson | Charlie Craig | Unaired | CBW112 | N/A |
Carter gets on the wrong side of a psychopath who gives his victims 15 minutes to get the key to the vest they're wearing before they burst into flames.

== Reception ==
The series received largely negative reviews from critics. The series has an approval rating of 0% on Rotten Tomatoes based on eight reviews. On Metacritic, the series has a weighted average score of 25 out of 100 based on 13 critics, indicating "generally unfavorable" reviews.

Brian Lowry of Variety wrote: "Fox leads better than it follows, which is perhaps why this drama about San Francisco's Deviant Crimes Unit seems so lifeless and uninspired. The producers jettison the pilot's leading lady five minutes into the second hour, though her replacement doesn't really improve things. The evidence points to another Friday-night casualty".
