= Mixtape (film) =

2021 comedy film

- Film poster
- Directed by: Valerie Weiss
- Written by: Stacey Menear
- Produced by: Gil Netter; Jim Wedaa
- Starring: Gemma Brooke Allen; Nick Thune; Julie Bowen
- Cinematography: Matthew Clark
- Edited by: William Steinkamp
- Music by: Tamar-kali
- Production company: Netter Productions
- Distributed by: Netflix
- Release date: December 3, 2021
- Running time: 93 minutes
- Country: United States
- Language: English

Mixtape is a 2021 American comedy film directed by Valerie Weiss from a screenplay by Stacey Menear. It stars Gemma Brooke Allen, Nick Thune, Julie Bowen and Olga Petsa.

== Plot ==
In the last months of 1999 in Spokane, Washington, middle schooler Beverly Moody lives with her grandmother Gail, a USPS mail carrier. She has been raised by her, since the death of her teen parents who died in a car accident when she was two years old.

Gail, upset by the death of her daughter Kim (Beverly's mom), avoids Beverly's constant questions about her, and fears that she could lose Beverly as she lost Kim. As a result, Beverly is an outcast at school, where she is regularly bullied by two boys.

One day, Beverly finds her parents’ mixtape “Love Riot,” but it ‘gets eaten’ by her Walkman, so cannot be played. She then sets out on a mission to track down the songs to find out more about her parents. With the reluctant help of unfriendly local record store owner Edward, aka "Anti", he puts the first song on tape for her. He explains that on a mixtape, the order of songs is crucial, as well as the time between them and other details, as it's “a message from the maker.”

Anti records for her the first song on the list, “Getting Nowhere Fast,” by Girls at Our Best. She then has to find more, in order, “Linda Linda” by the Blue Hearts, “I Got a Right” by the Stooges, and “Teacher’s Pet” by The Quick.

In the search for the songs, Beverly forms friendships with Ellen, a Taiwanese transfer student, and resident tough girl Nicky, mostly bonding over their shared interest in music. The girls' developing friendship also includes creating music with Nicky's brother's band's instruments, inspired by the mixtape.

They have a delightful expedition to a magical abandoned place Beverly's parents had their first date to More than This. They track down a musician Kim knew, and pressure Anti to bring them to his gig. Afterwards, Beverly shows him a Polaroid photo of him with Kim. Initially, the musician doesn't bother to look, but when he does, he remembers her as being a great lyricist, but then dismisses her as a loser for having a baby and seemingly abandoning music.

Upset, Beverly withdraws from the search, feeling it was all a mistake despite both Nicky’s and Ellen's pleas. She is again subjected to bullying. One particular time, having had enough, Beverly stands up to them. Stabbing the bullies' wheelchairs' wheels results in her suspension.

Beverly finally hashes things out with her grandmother, inspiring Gail to talk to Anti. Ellen and Nicky play for her The Kinks "Better Things.”When Gail finds the mixtape list discarded by Beverly, it inspires her to finally talk about Kim. She brings out a recording of "The Wrong Song,” written and sung by her mom and dad.

The film ends with the three girls performing as Us Dudes R Sisters songs inspired by the mixtape, in a New Year's Eve party that includes their three families and Anti.

== Cast ==
- Julie Bowen as Gail
- Gemma Brooke Allen as Beverly Moody
- Nick Thune as Anti
- Jackson Rathbone as Wes
- Olga Petsa as Nicky Jones
- Audrey Hsieh as Ellen
- Steph Song as Ellen's mother
- Diego Mercado as Steven

== Production ==
In June 2012, it was announced Tom Vaughan would direct the film, from a screenplay by Stacey Menear that was featured on the 2009 annual Black List of most-liked unproduced screenplays. In January 2021, Julie Bowen, Gemma Brooke Allen, Nick Thune, Jackson Rathbone, Olga Petsa, Audrey Hsieh and Diego Mercado joined the cast of the film, with Valerie Weiss set to direct the film replacing Vaughn, and Netflix set to distribute.

Principal photography began on February 8, 2021 and concluded on April 9, 2021 in Burnaby, British Columbia.

== Release ==
The film was released on December 3, 2021 via Netflix.

== Reception ==
On review aggregator Rotten Tomatoes, the film holds an approval rating of 100% based on 10 reviews, with an average rating of 7/10.
