= Samuel Braun =

Canadian actor

- Born: Vancouver, Canada
- Occupations: Actor; Musician
- Years active: 2013–present
- Television: Crew Girl

Samuel Braun is a Canadian actor and musician. His television credits include portraying prep school rower Josh Regis in Crew Girl (2026).

== Biography ==
Having appeared in an early career role in Percy Jackson: Sea Of Monsters, Braun had Dion acting roles including Time Cut (2024) and 2026 romantic comedy drama film Voicemails for Isabelle. He also appeared in television series Superman & Lois and The Way Home as well as Firefly Lane and Fire Country. As well as theatre roles, Braun is a musician who writes and produces his own music under the name Sam, the Seagull.

Braun had a lead role portraying entitled prep school rower Josh Regis in Netflix television series Crew Girl (2026). For the role, Braun underwent intense rowing training.

== Personal life ==
Born in Vancouver, Braun trains in long-distance running.

== Partial filmography ==
Year	Title	Role	Notes
2013	Percy Jackson: Sea Of Monsters	Young Luke	
2021	Superman & Lois	Jimmy Cutter	1 episode
2022	Firefly Lane	Franklin	1 episode
2023	Fire Country	Chris	1 episode
2023	Castaways	Finn	
2023–2024	The Way Home	Teen Nick	11 episodes
2024	Bad Genius	Pat Stone	
2024	Secrets on Maple Street	Archer Lambert	3 episodes
2024	Time Cut	Ethan	
2025	Timeless Tidings of Joy	George Parker	
2026	Voicemails for Isabelle	Equinox Ethan	
2026	Crew Girl	Josh Regis	Lead role
