= Sparks of Tomorrow =

Japanese light novel

- Light novel volume cover, featuring Inako Momokawa

二十世紀電氣目録 (Nijusseiki Denki Mokuroku)
- Light novel
- Written by: Hiro Yūki
- Illustrated by: Kazumi Ikeda
- Published by: Kyoto Animation
- Imprint: KA Esuma Bunko
- Published: August 10, 2018
- Anime television series
- Directed by: Minoru Ōta
- Written by: Tatsuhiko Urahata
- Music by: Hitomi Koto
- Studio: Kyoto Animation
- Licensed by: Netflix (streaming rights)
- Original network: Tokyo MX, BS11, ABC TV, TVA
- Original run: July 5, 2026 – September 27, 2026
- Episodes: 13
- icon

Sparks of Tomorrow, originally titled as 20 Seiki Denki Mokuroku (Japanese: 二十世紀電氣目録, Hepburn: Nijusseiki Denki Mokuroku; transl. '20th Century Electricity Catalog'), is a Japanese light novel written by Hiro Yūki and illustrated by Kazumi Ikeda, with art and backgrounds by Momoka Nagatani. Kyoto Animation published the novel under their KA Esuma Bunko imprint in August 2018. An anime television series adaptation also produced by the studio aired from July to September 2026.

== Plot ==
The novel takes place in the summer of 1907, the 40th year of the Meiji era in an alternate version of the 20th century Japan. Instead of the advancement of electrical power and innovations, technological progress was delayed and both was shaped by and relied on steam power—blanketing Kyoto in the resulting heavy smog.

15-year-old Inako Momokawa is the second daughter of a sake brewer in Fushimi, Kyoto. Deep within her heart hide the dreams and regrets over the loss of her mother and the overbearing nature of her father. Nothing she does ever comes out right, and she receives a scolding from her father every day. A deeply devout Shinto practitioner, her only relief is the trust she places in her prayers to the gods for salvation.

On one of her regular visits to the Fushimi Inari shrine, she met a free-spirited young man named Kihachi Sakamoto. Due to the loss of his older brother, Seiroku, he became distrustful and rejected the gods. Their vision of an electrical revolution crumbled with his brother's disappearance—along with Kihachi's "Electrical Catalog," a work of concepts about electricity he wrote as a child but that his brother took with him when he vanished. At the shrine, he boasted to Inako that he had no belief in gods and told her of his dream of the incoming "Age of Electricity," and told her to "believe in things you cannot see."

Inako suddenly brought up the topic of her forced arranged marriage, telling Kihachi that her father was one-sidedly making all decisions for her, and that she was about to give up hope. She told Kihachi that she gave up resisting her father's decision to marry her off because of how worthless she felt. Kihachi drew out her true feelings of wanting to be free of her family, and he resolved to help take her away from her confining home and father.

They decided that the only way to stop her forced marriage was to find Kihachi's "Electrical Catalog." With its current whereabouts unknown, they followed clues in their search that led to Kyoto and Shiga prefectures, all while fleeing Inako's marriage arrangement. As his innovations were revealed, they set about exploring the secrets of the catalog and got a glimpse into the future they were longing for.

== Characters ==
Kihachi Sakamoto (坂本 喜八, Sakamoto Kihachi)
Voiced by: Yuma Uchida (Japanese); Hunter McCoy, Anjali Kunapaneni (young) (English)
A timid boy who has a knack of inventing machines. He originally dreamed of ushering in an age of electricity with his older brother Seiroku using the 20th Century Electrical Catalog, but was forced to repress it following the disappearance of Seiroku and the Catalog.
Inako Momokawa (百川 稲子, Momokawa Inako)
Voiced by: Sora Amamiya (Japanese); Audrey Hsieh (English)
A trustworthy yet unassertive girl who is part of a family of sake brewers. She dreams of following her deceased mother's footsteps of becoming a sake brewer. She has unwavering faith in the gods and Buddhas, and frequently visits shrines whenever she is troubled.
Yosuke Mizoe (三添 洋輔, Mizoe Yōsuke)
Voiced by: Koki Uchiyama (Japanese); Paul Castro Jr. (English)
A talented engineer and scion of a steam engine firm who aims to obtain the 20th Century Electrical Catalog by any means necessary, including an engagement to Inako. He once worked as a devoted assistant to Seiroku. A dashing, handsome man who wears his hair long and tied back, sports eyeshadow, and wears heeled, women's-style long boots.
Seiroku Sakamoto (坂本 清六, Sakamoto Seiroku)
Voiced by: Daisuke Ono (Japanese); John Choi (English)
Kihachi's older brother, who has a passion for electricity and aims to help usher a new age with Kihachi before mysteriously disappearing with the 20th Century Electrical Catalog during a war.
Kengo Kuga (陸 健吾, Kuga Kengo)
Voiced by: Shunsuke Takeuchi (Japanese); Jonathon Ha (English)
A former soldier and assistant of Seiroku who has imposing physical strength and is familiar with the 20th Century Electrical Catalog carried by Seiroku. He is also Noriko's fiancée.
Noriko Momokawa (百川 規子, Momokawa Noriko)
Voiced by: Minako Kotobuki (Japanese); Courtney Lin (English)
Inako's older sister and Kengo's fiancée, who is skilled in martial arts and watches over Inako's growth, while also secretly possessing the 20th Century Electrical Catalog.
Suzu Harashima (原島 すず, Harashima Suzu)
Voiced by: Yō Taichi (Japanese); Cherami Leigh (English)
Inako and Kate's witty and cunning classmate who keeps a variety of tools.
Kate Okura (大倉 ケイト, Okura Keito)
Voiced by: Natsumi Kawaida (Japanese); Cassandra Lee Morris (English)
Inako and Suzu's British-Japanese classmate who is full of energy.
Yajiro Yagura (矢倉 弥治郎, Yagura Yajiro)
Voiced by: Kazuki Ura (Japanese); Caleb Yen (English)
Kihachi's shy cousin who is talented at drawing and is the heir to the boarding house which housed Kihachi.
Izo Masubuchi (鱒淵 伊蔵, Masubuchi Izo)
Voiced by: Daisuke Hirakawa (Japanese); Jason Griffith (English)
Yosuke's loyal secretary and bodyguard who mainly serves as his guardian.
Jinemon Momokawa (百川 甚右衛門, Momokawa Jinemon)
Voiced by: Hiroshi Yanaka (Japanese); William Salyers (English)
Inako and Noriko's father.
Naeko Momokawa (百川 苗子, Momokawa Naeko)
Voiced by: Mayumi Asano (Japanese); Crystal Lee (English)
Inako and Noriko's deceased mother.
Bunshichi Yagura (矢倉 文七, Yagura Bunshichi)
Voiced by: Daichi Endō (Japanese); Brent Mukai (English)
Yajiro's father and the uncle of Kihachi and Seiroku.
Tome (とめ)
Voiced by: Ayahi Takagaki (Japanese); Debi Derryberry (English)
A maid in the service of the Momokawa family.
Inari (イナリ)
Voiced by: Ayahi Takagaki
The pet ermine of Inako.
Ainosuke Oshie (推し 愛之助, Oshie Ainosuke)
Voiced by: Kenn (Japanese); Kieran Regan (English)
A university student who has a crush on Suzu.
Stuart Smith (スチュワート スミス, Suchuwāto Sumisu)
Voiced by: Yoshihisa Kawahara (Japanese); Bill Rogers (English)
Kate's British father and the mentor of Seiroku, Yosuke, and Kengo.

== Media ==
=== Light novel ===
Written by Hiro Yūki and illustrated by Kazumi Ikeda with art and backgrounds by Momoka Nagatani, Kyoto Animation published the novel under their KA Esuma Bunko imprint on August 10, 2018 (ISBN 978-4-907064-88-4).

=== Anime ===
On July 27, 2018, KA Esuma Bunko's Twitter account announced that an anime adaptation of the novel would be produced and animated by Kyoto Animation, but the project's status remained unknown for years following the arson attack the following year, which destroyed Kyoto Animation's main production office.

On October 25, 2025, Kyoto Animation announced during its "KyoAni no Sekai-ten" ("Meet the Worlds of KyoAni") event that the anime adaptation would be a television series, titled 20 Seiki Denki Mokuroku Eureka Evrika (二十世紀電氣目録-ユーレカ・エヴリカ-) and known in English as Sparks of Tomorrow. It is directed by Minoru Ōta, with series composition handled by Tatsuhiko Urahata, features character designs by Kohei Okamura, who also serves as chief animation director, a worldview setting handled by Takaaki Suzuki, and music composed by Hitomi Koto. The series aired from July 5 to September 27, 2026, on Tokyo MX and other networks. An advance screening for the first episode was held at the 2026 Annecy Festival in Annecy, France. The opening theme song is "Eureka Evrika", performed by Luna Goami, while the ending theme song is "Soarin'", performed by American indie soul group Ginger Root. Netflix is streaming the series globally.

==== Episodes ====
No.	Title	Directed by	Written by	Storyboarded by	Original release date
1	"The Electric Boy"; Transliteration: "Denki Shōnen" (Japanese: 電氣少年)	Minoru Ōta	Tatsuhiko Urahata	Minoru Ōta	July 5, 2026
In 1903, Seiroku Sakamoto encourages his brother Kihachi to come up with ideas to usher in an "Age of Electricity" amid society's reliance on steam power, showcasing him a light show with electric bulbs. Kihachi assists Seiroku through the 20th Century Electrical Catalog until Seiroku and the Catalog disappeared without a trace. Four years later, a disillusioned Kihachi resents Seiroku for abandoning him. He crosses paths with Inako Momokawa, the devout yet clumsy daughter of sake brewers who is skeptical of electricity. Inako returns home as Yosuke Mizoe, the heir of a major steam engine firm, demands for her marriage as leverage over her family's debt. Inako's father Jinemon is forced to accept, and Yosuke uses it as pretext to ransack the Momokawa estate in search of the Catalog. Inako's sister Noriko urges her to meet with Kihachi and gives the Catalog to her, much to her confusion. Inako heads to Kihachi's shop and sees his slide projector conjure an image of her late mother Naeko. Kihachi briefs Inako on electricity, leaving her in awe. Inako hands the Catalog to Kihachi when they are disturbed by Yosuke, who followed Inako to the shop.
2	"The Mysteries of the Catalog"; Transliteration: "Mokuroku no Nazo" (Japanese: 目録の謎)	Ryo Miyagi	Tatsuhiko Urahata	Minoru Ōta	July 12, 2026
A struggle ensues for possession of the Catalog until Yosuke's butler Izo Masubuchi subdues Kihachi and Inako. Yosuke leaves with Inako and the Catalog, but Inako conceals it in her robes and throws its storage case into a river. While Yosuke tries to retrieve the case, Inako is taken back to the Momokawa estate and locked in their storehouse. Noriko protests Inako's forced marriage, though Jinemon will not budge. Kihachi heads to the storehouse where Inako gives him the Catalog. While happy, Kihachi grows suspicious on the Catalog's missing second half and how Noriko acquired it. Kihachi encourages Inako to escape with him after noticing her disapproval for her marriage to Yosuke, and they flee on a kite he developed. Yosuke realizes the ruse and chases after the duo with Noriko's fiancée, Kengo Kuga, revealing they are Seiroku's former assistants. They recapture Kihachi and Inako before returning to the estate. Yosuke obtains the Catalog and tries to read it, only to see it being filled with Kihachi's drawings and writings. Believing it is fake, a furious Yosuke demands Kihachi on the location of the real Catalog.
3	"Their Dream"; Transliteration: "Futari no Yume" (Japanese: 二人の夢)	Takuya Yamamura	Tatsuhiko Urahata	Minoru Ōta	July 19, 2026
Both Kihachi and Yosuke recall Seiroku proclaiming the Age of Electricity will begin through the Catalog. Yosuke, convinced the Catalog is fake, angrily ridicules Kihachi's writings as fantasy, though Inako defends Kihachi. A disinterested Yosuke leaves while Kengo frees Kihachi out of pity. The next day, Inako's classmates Suzu Harashima and Kate Okura request Kihachi to visit Inako, who reveals she detected her mother's scent on the Catalog. Suzu uncovers hidden pages containing Seiroku's schematics on Kihachi's ideas, so Inako tells him to prove its authenticity. A skeptical Kihachi works on creating a new lightbulb but remains puzzled by Seiroku's hint about the "moon princess". Recognizing it as a reference to The Tale of the Bamboo Cutter, Inako and her friends and family help Kihachi produce a new bamboo-based lightbulb filament. After much trial and error, Kihachi publicly demonstrates his "Electric Full Moon", a balloon carrying a bundle of brighter, longer lasting lightbulbs that outshine the existing gas-powered lights. Kihachi renews his faith in Seiroku, while Yosuke realizes the Catalog's authenticity and grows jealous of his success.
4	"The Steadfast Girl"; Transliteration: "Shinjin no Musume" (Japanese: 信心の娘)	Ayumu Yoshida	Takaaki Suzuki	Ayumu Yoshida	July 26, 2026
Inako searches for Naeko's notes, dreaming on becoming a master brewer. However, Jinemon shoots down her dream to uphold the marriage agreement. Yosuke breaks into Kihachi's shop again to steal the Catalog but is ejected by a pair of guards hired by Kengo, who wants to see how far Kihachi can go with the Catalog. Yosuke drives away in anger, while Kihachi and Inako run into Akira Nishikiya, the heir to a traditional weaving shop. They escort him home, discovering that the shop is in financial distress due to Akira's mother shutting herself away to mourn his father's passing. Resonating with Akira's situation, Inako and Kihachi develop an invention to cheer up the proprietress, while Yosuke pressures the shop to use his steam-powered looms. Using a combination of Kihachi's projector and the "Electric Telepathy", a primitive telephone, the proprietress remotely communicates with her late husband, who is secretly Akira consoling her. With her guilt lifted, the proprietress resumes running the shop, invalidating the need for the looms. Yosuke is aggravated by Kihachi's success and grows determined to obtain the Catalog to resurrect Seiroku.
5	"Proof of Love"; Transliteration: "Ai no Shōmei" (Japanese: 愛の証明)	Takanori Kitanohara	Yusuke Ichikawa	Takuya Yamamura	August 2, 2026
As Kihachi develops an electric battery, Inako and Kate notice that he has invented an "Electric Matchmaker" that supposedly reads electrical signals from the brain to tell if two people are romantically compatible. Kihachi voices skepticism on its functionality as a university student named Ainosuke Oshie arrives, wanting to use the Electric Matchmaker to prove his feelings for Suzu. They test the machine on various pairs like Kengo's guards, Yosuke and Izo, and Noriko and Kengo. However, the inconsistent results cause Kihachi to believe the machine is faulty. Meanwhile, the machine reminds Izo of how he had taken care of Yosuke since he was a child, while Yosuke decides to observe Kihachi's developments with the Catalog for now. Kihachi notices the matchmaker has a broken wire which actually shocks one of the users, stimulating their brain instead of reading it. Ainosuke uses the machine's defect regardless to give him the courage to confess to Suzu, but she politely turns him down. Inako comforts Kihachi over the failure of the machine, pointing out that it did reveal the true feelings of the people who used it. Meanwhile, Kate, who was jealous of Ainosuke's feelings for Suzu, is relieved she can still be friends with her.
6	"The Sound of Innovation"; Transliteration: "Kakushin no Oto" (Japanese: 革新の音)	Tatsuya Ishihara	Atsuo Ishino	Tatsuya Ishihara	August 9, 2026
Kihachi and his friends are invited by Yosuke to visit his theme park Mizoe Park, where he shows off its Grand Hall as the venue for his wedding to Inako. He then plays his steam organ, though Kihachi's group criticizes his poor skills. Offended, Yosuke challenges Kihachi to a musical contest. Kihachi asks Inako, Suzu, and Kate to use traditional Japanese instruments powered by electric sound amplification. The girls rigorously practice in time for the contest, as Yosuke shows off a steam-powered animatronic that plays the steam organ while he performs ballet. The girls prepare to play, but Inako has her confidence shaken following Jinemon's demands to not publicly humiliate the family. Kihachi assures her to trust his inventions. Kengo volunteers to help generate the electricity as he overloads the amplification to inadvertently invent heavy metal music. The girls' performance becomes a surprise success, leaving Jinemon and Yosuke uncharacteristically impressed. Kate's father Stuart Smith introduces himself to Kihachi, much to the discomfort of Kengo. Elsewhere, Yosuke commends Kihachi's work to an animatronic built in Seiroku's likeness.
7	"Elopement"; Transliteration: "Kakeochi" (Japanese: 駆け落ち)	Ryo Miyagi	Tatsuhiko Urahata	Ryo Miyagi	August 16, 2026
Kihachi, Kate, and Suzu visit Inako only to discover that Yosuke has decided at the last minute to hold their betrothal ceremony that day to formalize their marriage. Seeing Inako is conflicted, Kihachi insists she not go through the marriage if it means giving up on her dream. Noriko overhears the conversation and insists Inako run away with Kihachi, and they decide to head for Shiga by boat, where Stuart has invited Kihachi to see Seiroku's half of the Catalog. During their journey, Kihachi boasts to Inako that electricity will eventually remove the pollution clouding Kyoto's skies, as well as make flying machines possible. Yosuke chases the duo by the river believing they are eloping, and a fearful Kengo joins to stop Kihachi from meeting Stuart. Upon seeing Kihachi use the battery to create and power the boat's propeller, Kengo has a change of heart and agrees to help him and Inako escape to Shiga. They manage to evade Yosuke's men and reach Stuart's residence, where he confirms he has the Catalog's second half.
8	"His Brother's Footsteps"; Transliteration: "Ani no Ashiato" (Japanese: 兄の足跡)	Takuya Yamamura	Takaaki Suzuki	Takuya Yamamura	August 23, 2026
Stuart reveals he inspired Seiroku to research electricity. He shows Kihachi the library safeguarding the Catalog's second half, though it is sealed behind an electric lock. Kengo suddenly suffers a nervous breakdown just as Inako and Jinemon arrive. He opens up to the group that he served with Seiroku in a European war, where Seiroku gave him the Catalog and was killed in action. Realizing that he only survived due to the Catalog protecting him, Kengo developed survivor guilt. Not wanting to burden Kihachi with Seiroku's death, a guilt-ridden Kengo returned to Japan to seal the Catalog in Stuart's library. Kihachi processes the information, when he eavesdrops on Jinemon saying that Yosuke is willing to call off the marriage in exchange for the Catalog, much to Inako's disapproval. Kihachi and Inako discover the lock is powered by a waterwheel and repair it, leading them closer to their dreams. The lock then opens in response to Stuart's palm print and Kihachi completes the Catalog with Seiroku's half. With his goal accomplished, Kihachi shares with a confused Inako his plans to turn the Catalog over to Yosuke.
9	"Time to Part"; Transliteration: "Wakare no Toki" (Japanese: 別れの時)	Ayumu Yoshida & Taichi Ishidate	Tatsuhiko Urahata	Ayumu Yoshida	August 30, 2026
Kihachi later informs Jinemon and Noriko on his intentions. Unwilling to let Kihachi give up his own dream for her sake, Inako instead follows through Yosuke's marriage proposal to resolve their family dispute. Kihachi becomes stunned and confused at Inako's sacrifice, so he infiltrates Yosuke's ball on his ship at Lake Biwa with Kengo. At the ball, Noriko sees a distressed Inako and tells her how she met Seiroku during one of Stuart's classes and became inspired by his vision of the Age of Electricity. Yosuke is irked on his plan to coerce Kihachi being derailed, recalling how he first idolized Seiroku as a timid college student and became devastated by his death. Yosuke grew obsessed in claiming the Catalog for himself, deducing that Noriko was concealing the Catalog's first half for Kihachi to eventually obtain. As Yosuke prepares to formalize his marriage to Inako, Kihachi crashes the ball and surrenders the Catalog, frustrating Inako. Yosuke ecstatically dances with Kihachi to celebrate his goal, but becomes angered at Kihachi defiantly declaring he can herald the Age of Electricity without the Catalog.
10	"Engagement Trouble"; Transliteration: "Kyūkon Sōdō" (Japanese: 求婚騒動)	Noriyuki Kitanohara	Atsuo Ishino	Noriyuki Kitanohara	September 6, 2026
Yosuke pores through the Catalog looking for Seiroku's "secret" and comes across a diagram of a circuit board, enthralling him. Meanwhile, Inako is relieved to see Kihachi remaining focused on his dream through developing an electric aircraft. When they learn that Kengo plans to break up with Noriko over his guilt on hiding facts about Seiroku from her, Kihachi and Inako decide to help him. Kengo admits that he always had feelings for Noriko since they were childhood friends but felt that Noriko held a stronger affection towards Seiroku. Noriko confides in Inako that Seiroku gave her the Catalog's first half before leaving for the war, promising that he would return and decode the secrets of the Electric Nishiki, a special chapter in the Catalog. Kengo musters the courage to reaffirm his commitment to Noriko, which she accepts. Yosuke decides he needs help to decode the blueprint, as a package is delivered to Kihachi's workshop. Kihachi is then approached by Stuart's companion Saki, who offers to help retrieve the Catalog as an act of revenge against Yosuke.
11	"The Enticing Circuit"; Transliteration: "Sasō Kairo" (Japanese: 誘う回路)	Ryo Miyagi	Tatsuhiko Urahata	Tatsuya Ishihara & Ryo Miyagi	September 13, 2026
Saki reveals herself as Yosuke's older sister and leads Inako to Yosuke's mansion. While Saki recovers imported alcohol that Yosuke was hoarding, Inako copies the Electric Nishiki, while Kihachi collects the package containing Seiroku's circuit board diagrams. The next day, Inako arrives at Kihachi's workshop to deliver the Electric Nishiki, but finds out he has been consumed with decoding the diagrams. Seeing Kihachi's various inventions and remembering Naeko's words, Inako comes to realize the Electric Nishiki is actually her mother's secret sake recipe. Jinemon admits the Electric Nishiki is the name of the sake Naeko wanted to create to compete with foreign alcohol before her passing, and Inako expresses her desire to brew it. Meanwhile, Kihachi determines he needs quartz crystals and heads to an abandoned mine, but is caught in a tunnel collapse. While waiting for rescue, Kihachi has an epiphany and realizes the circuits are key to create an "Electric Brain". He is later rescued by Yosuke, who proposes on a truce and alliance with him to create the Electric Brain.
12	"Electric Brain"; Transliteration: "Denki Zunō" (Japanese: 電氣頭脳)	Noriyuki Kitanohara & Minoru Ōta	Taakaki Suzuki	Minoru Ōta	September 20, 2026
Inako meets Kihachi in the hospital and they promise to see who can achieve their dream first. Inako goes about brewing the Electric Nishiki, while Kihachi moves into Yosuke's factory underneath Mizoe Park to develop the Electric Brain. After some time, Inako tries to visit Kihachi but finds out he has disappeared. Saki later visits and points out that in order for the Electric Nishiki to be perfect, Inako should think about the person she wants to drink it the most. Realizing her feelings for Kihachi, Inako goes to look for him at Mizoe Park. Meanwhile, Kihachi and Yosuke complete the Electric Brain, but Yosuke has Kihachi knocked out and tries to use the Electric Brain to bring the animatronic Seiroku back to life. However, the animatronic remains incomplete as it lacks a soul. Kengo helps Inako and her friends break into the factory, and she makes her way to the bottom where she finds Yosuke attempting to use Kihachi as a vessel for the Electric Brain.
13	"To the Future We Desire"; Transliteration: "Nozomu Mirai e" (Japanese: 望む未来へ)	Taichi Ishidate & Ayumu Yoshida	Tatsuhiko Urahata	Takuya Yamamura	September 27, 2026
Inako disconnects Kihachi from the Electric Brain, which causes it to go out of control and it begins collapsing. Everybody manages to escape except for Yosuke, who is trapped under the rubble. Determined to rescue him, Kihachi assembles his electric plane and Inako volunteers to be his copilot. They fly into the sinkhole created by the Electric Brain's collapse and try to dig Yosuke out. Meanwhile, Yosuke has a vision of reuniting with Seiroku in the afterlife, but Seiroku insists he live and create the Age of Electricity with Kihachi. Kihachi and Inako rescue Yosuke and all three barely escape as the Electric Brain completely collapses. Several months later, everybody celebrates the completion of the first batch of Electric Nishiki, Kengo and Noriko marry, and Yosuke travels abroad to continue his studies. Inako takes Kihachi to a secluded beach where they can view Mount Fuji. Kihachi once again promises he will make the Age of Electricity a reality and Inako promises to continue fully supporting him. Kihachi then has a premonition of his and Inako’s eventual wedding, much to his embarrassment.

== Reception ==
Sparks of Tomorrow won an honorable mention in the full-length novel category at the 8th Kyoto Animation Awards in 2017. The entry was the only one to win any of the awards available that year.
