= Audrey Hsieh =

American actress

- Occupation: Actress
- Years active: 2014–present

Audrey Hsieh is an American actress. She is best known for playing Ellen in the comedy film Mixtape.

== Early life ==
Hsieh began acting at the age of six after a talent agent gave her a business card at a Target. She entered Portola High School in 2018.

== Career ==
Hsieh's first role was as one-off appearance in the crime series Criminal Minds. Her first film role was as Lindsay in the comedy drama Here Today. Her biggest role so far has been playing Ellen in Mixtape. In 2025 it was revealed that she was added to the reboot of Buffy the Vampire Slayer.

== Personal life ==
Hsieh has a fraternal twin named Haley. She has many other passions that include digital painting and drawing, playing games like League of Legends and Genshin Impact, fine arts and fashion. She has a desire to go to college and learn how to animate.

== Filmography ==
=== Film ===
Year	Title	Role	Notes
2021	Here Today	Lindsay	
2021	Ron's Gone Wrong	Additional voice	Voice
2021	Mixtape	Ellen	

=== Television ===
Year	Title	Role	Notes
2014	Criminal Minds	Asian Girl	Episode: "Gabby"
2023	Mask Girl	Mo-mi and Mi-mo	Voice; English version
2024	Found	Stevie Zhao	Episode: "Missing While Haunted"
2025	Medalist	Suzu Kamoto	2 episodes Voice; English version
2025	A Star Brighter Than the Sun	Additional voice	Episode: "Te o Nobishita Hi"; Voice; English version
2026	Sparks of Tomorrow	Inako Momokawa	Voice; English version
