= Kate (film) =

2021 film by Cedric Nicolas-Troyan

- Promotional release poster
- Directed by: Cedric Nicolas-Troyan
- Written by: Umair Aleem
- Produced by: Kelly McCormick; Bryan Unkeless; Patrick Newall
- Starring: Mary Elizabeth Winstead; Miku Martineau; Woody Harrelson; Jun Kunimura
- Cinematography: Lyle Vincent
- Edited by: Sandra Montiel; Elísabet Ronaldsdóttir
- Music by: Nathan Barr
- Production companies: 87North Productions; Clubhouse Pictures
- Distributed by: Netflix
- Release date: September 10, 2021
- Running time: 106 minutes
- Country: United States
- Languages: English; Japanese
- Budget: $25 million

Kate is a 2021 American action thriller film directed by Cedric Nicolas-Troyan and written by Umair Aleem. The film stars Mary Elizabeth Winstead, Miku Martineau, Woody Harrelson, Tadanobu Asano, Michiel Huisman, Miyavi, and Jun Kunimura. The film follows Kate (Winstead), an assassin, whose mentor and handler (Harrelson) assigns her to kill a high-ranking yakuza boss. During Kate's final mission, she finds out that she has been poisoned and has at most a day to live, so she uses her last hours to get revenge and find out who set her up.

The film was released on September 10, 2021, by Netflix and received mixed reviews from critics, who praised Winstead's performance but found the film "disappointingly derivative of numerous other female assassin films".

== Plot ==
Kate is an assassin and expert sniper who eliminates targets chosen by her trusted mentor and handler, Varrick, or V. After she was left orphaned as a child, Varrick raised her as a father figure, giving her extensive training in weapons and combat and eventually inducting her into his private team of wetwork specialists.

Kate is in Osaka to kill an officer of a powerful yakuza syndicate, but Kate resists taking the shot because a child has unexpectedly accompanied him. She ultimately shoots the target at Varrick's insistence. While Kate's assignment is a success, this breach of her personal code to not kill in the presence of children leaves her in emotional turmoil. She tells Varrick that she will do one final mission, and then retire so she can start a new life.

Before the final mission, Kate meets a charismatic stranger, Stephen, at her hotel's bar. The pair share a bottle of wine and have sex in her room. Later, while preparing her sniper's nest, she starts getting symptoms of dizziness that cause her to miss the shot. Kate realizes that Stephen poisoned her, and after crashing a car, wakes up in a hospital to learn that she has acute radiation poisoning caused by Polonium-204 and only a day to live. She steals injectable stimulant drugs and a gun and sets out to exact revenge on whoever poisoned her.

Kate tracks down Stephen and his girlfriend and learns that they were strong-armed into poisoning her by Sato, a yakuza affiliated with the Kijima crime family. Kate finds Sato at a luxury restaurant and kills him along with dozens of armed yakuza. Desperate for information about the reclusive, well-guarded boss Kijima, who she thinks might be behind the poisoning, she kidnaps Ani, Kijima's niece. Kate realizes that Ani is the girl who saw her father die during the Osaka mission.

Kate uses Ani as bait to lure Kijima out into the open but decides to become her protector when she learns that Ani's family wants to kill her as part of an internal power struggle, led by Kijima's corrupt advisor, Renji. Kate uncovers more clues about the Osaka mission and realizes that her trust in Varrick may be misplaced. She tracks down Kijima, who reveals that Renji made a deal with Varrick to incorporate his team into the syndicate in exchange for killing Kijima and all of his blood relatives. Simultaneously, Ani learns of Kate's involvement in her father's death from Varrick, causing her to graze Kate's face in fury when she attempts to dissuade her, and leaves with Varrick. Kijima, aware that Kate is close to death, joins her with a small army of his men in launching an attack on Renji's headquarters.

After a fierce gunfight, most of Renji and Varrick's men are killed, and Kijima personally beheads Renji for his betrayal. Kate locates Varrick, who is holding Ani at gunpoint. The two have a fast draw and Varrick is fatally shot in the stomach. Ani then helps Kate walk outside to the roof, where Kate sheds a single tear as she succumbs to her poisoning.

== Cast ==
- Mary Elizabeth Winstead as Kate, an assassin
- Woody Harrelson as Varrick, Kate's mentor and handler
- Miku Martineau as Ani, the niece of top Japanese crime boss Kijima
- Tadanobu Asano as Renji, a yakuza to Kijima
- Jun Kunimura as Kijima, an aging yakuza boss and Ani's uncle
- Michiel Huisman as Stephen, who poisons Kate
- Mari Yamamoto as Kanako, Stephen's girlfriend
- Miyavi as Jojima, Renji's boyfriend and a skilled hand-to-hand combatant

In addition to providing two songs to the soundtrack, the musical group Band-Maid appear as themselves, performing one of those songs in the club where Kate finds Ani.

== Production and release ==
In October 2017, Netflix acquired Umair Aleem's script Kate, with David Leitch, Kelly McCormick, Bryan Unkeless and Scott Morgan producing the film. The film was greenlit with a production budget of $25 million. The screenplay was later voted onto the Black List that December. In December 2018, Cedric Nicolas-Troyan signed on to direct the film. In April 2019, Mary Elizabeth Winstead was cast to star in the film. In July 2019, Woody Harrelson joined the cast. In September, Michiel Huisman, Tadanobu Asano and Jun Kunimura were among new additions to the cast. In November 2019, it was announced that the Japanese rock band Band-Maid would appear in the film.

Filming commenced on September 16, 2019 and concluded on November 29, 2019. Shooting locations include Thailand, Tokyo, Japan, and Los Angeles, California.

Winstead had previously worked with stunt performer Hayley Wright on the film Gemini Man and trained with her extensively before filming began. Winstead appreciated that they both had a background in dance and moved in the same way. Unfortunately Wright was injured on the first day of filming in Thailand and other stunt performers had to be brought on instead. The film was released on September 10, 2021.

== Reception ==
On Rotten Tomatoes, 45% of 95 critics have given the film a positive review. The website's critics consensus reads, "Mary Elizabeth Winstead does reliably gripping work in the title role, but Kate is disappointingly derivative of numerous other female assassin films." On Metacritic, the film has a weighted average score of 47 out of 100, based on reviews from 22 critics, indicating "mixed or average" reviews.

Richard Roeper of the Chicago Sun-Times wrote: "So, yes: Kate is John Wick meets Die Hard meets Collateral meets Kill Bill all the volumes and we've seen it all before and you're not going to get much in the way of original plot, but what you WILL get is a grindhouse of a good time with some bleak and wickedly sharp humor, screen-popping visuals and some pretty great fight choreography." CNN's Brian Lowry was critical of the lack of originality comparing it to the film noir D.O.A. released in 1950. He said the action was "plentiful and particularly bloody" but the story lacks mystery and was "wholly predictable".

The Hollywood Reporter review of Kate criticizes it as a derivative film lacking originality, and a mishmash of other action flicks, such as Extraction, Gunpowder Milkshake, and John Wick. Likewise, Teo Bugby of The New York Times criticized it as an unremarkable and clichéd, in particular feeling that the film's portrayal of Japanese culture and aesthetics was shallow.

== See also ==
- D.O.A. (1950 film) - film noir with similar premise
- D.O.A. - 1988 American remake of the 1950 film
- Color Me Dead - 1969 Australian remake of the 1950 film
- Gunpowder Milkshake - 2021 film with a similar premise.
