= 2026 in comics =

Notable events of 2026 in comics

== Events ==
=== January ===
- January 4: The comics theme park Plopsa Station near the Antwerp Central Station, Belgium, closes down.
- January 9: It is announced that the Angoulême Comics Festival, which had been cancelled in 2025 due to a large scandal, will be revived in 2027 under a different name, organisation, logo and identity.
- January 10: Only two months after a record-breaking auction of a first-print copy of the very first Superman comic book (Action Comics #1), another copy is auctioned for 9.21 million dollars. It was previously in possession of actor Nicolas Cage.
- January 23: Dutch comic artist Milan Hulsing wins the Stripschapprijs.
- January 29: The heirs of the late comic artist Will Eisner announce their intention to sell the rights to his entire body of work, including his signature comic The Spirit.
- January 30: The journalistic platform Drawing The Times receives the P. Hans Frankfurtherprijs for its achievements in graphic journalism.

== Deaths ==
=== January ===
- January 8: Sergio Goizauskas, Argentine-born French cartoonist, dies at age 69.
- January 9: Ulf Granberg, Swedish comics writer and editor (The Phantom), dies at age 80.
- January 11: Sergio Tarquinio, Italian comic artist (Picture Library, Storia del West), dies at age 100.
- January 13: Scott Adams, American comics writer and artist (Dilbert), dies at age 68.
- January 17: Dino Attanasio, Italian-born Belgian comic writer and artist (Signor Spaghetti, De Macaroni's, Fanfan et Polo, Johnny Goodbye, Bob Morane, Modeste et Pompon), dies at age 100.
- January 18: Diana Green, American comics artist (Tranny Towers), dies at age 71.
- January 24: Sal Buscema, American comic artist (The Incredible Hulk, Spectacular Spider-Man, Captain America, Rom The Space Knight, Spider-Girl), dies at age 89.
- January 27: Paul Sample, British cartoonist (Ogri), dies at age 78.
- January 29: Roger Martin, French comics writer (AmeriKKKa), dies at age 75.

=== February ===
- February 8: Jon Kudelka, Australian cartoonist, dies at age 53.
- February 24: Koichiro Iida, Japanese manga artist, dies at age 74.
- February 25: Michael Halperin, American comics writer (Masters of the Universe), dies at age 91.
- February 27:
  - Eddie Germano, American cartoonist, dies at age 101.
  - Tatjana Wood, German-born American comics artist (Camelot 3000, Swamp Thing, Animal Man), dies at age 99.

=== March ===
- March 1:
  - Clément Oubrerie, French comics artist (Aya de Yopougon), dies at age 59.
  - Jacopo Camagni, Italian comics artist (Captain Marvel, The Vision and the Scarlet Witch, Deadpool), dies at age 48.
- March 3: Yoshiharu Tsuge, Japanese cartoonist, dies at age 88.
- March 10:
  - Luc Giard, Canadian cartoonist, dies at age 69.
  - Michael Hague, American comics artist (Eye of Newt, In the Small, Mammon), dies at age 77.
- March 15: Sam Kieth, American comics artist and writer (The Sandman, The Maxx, Marvel Comics Presents, Zero Girl), dies at age 63.
- March 22: Hermann Huppen, Belgian comics writer (Jeremiah), dies at age 87.
- March 23: Anna-Marie Cool, American comic artist (Doctor Strange, Barbie Fashion, Toto of Oz), dies at age 69.
- March 24: Barry Caldwell, American comic artist (Jingle Belle), dies at age 68.
- March 31: Jean-Paul Krassinsky, French comics artist (Le Crépuscule des Idiots, Paroles d'École, La Fin du Monde en Trinquant), dies at age 53.

=== April ===
- April 5: Jacques-Armand Cardon, French cartoonist, dies at age 89.
- April 10: Yōsuke Tamori, Japanese manga artist and writer (PopoloCrois), dies at age 74.
- April 12: Frank Stack, American cartoonist, dies at age 88.
- April 21:
  - Pavel Matuška, Czech cartoonist, dies at age 82.
  - Barrie Tomlinson, British comic book editor and writer (Judge Dredd, Janus Stark), dies at age 88.
- April 23:
  - Nicole Hollander, American cartoonist, dies at age 86.
  - Jean-Benoît Meybeck, French comic book writer (CosmoBacchus), dies at age 53.
- April 26:
  - Gerry Conway, American comic book writer (Punisher, The Amazing Spider-Man, Atari Force, Justice League), dies at age 73.
  - Dick Matena, Dutch comics writer (Storm), dies at age 83.
- April 27: Len Strazewski, American comic book writer (Justice Society of America, Starman, Prime, Action Comics), dies at age 71.

=== May ===
- May 8: Koji Suzuki, Japanese writer and manga writer (The Ring, Dark Water), dies at age 68.
- May 12: Izo Hashimoto, Japanese manga writer (Shamo), dies at age 72.
- May 15: João Abel Manta, Portuguese cartoonist, dies at age 98.
- May 16:
  - John A. Lent, American comics scholar and founder of the International Journal of Comics Art, dies at age 90.
  - Predrag Koraksić Corax, Serbian cartoonist, dies at age 92.
- May 19: Paul Becton, American comic book artist (Iron Man, Quasar, The Avengers, Thor), dies at age 73.
- May 24: Jordi Amorós i Ballester, Spanish cartoonist, dies at age 82.

=== June ===
- June 4: Marjane Satrapi, French-Iranian comic author (Persepolis), dies at age 56.
- June 11: Jane Yolen, American writer and comic book writer (Foiled, The Last Dragon, Hellboy), dies at age 87.
- June 22: Jim Goad, American writer and comic book writer (Trucker Fags in Denial), dies at age 65.
- June 25: Eriamel, French comic book writer, dies at age 73.
- June 29: Franco Devescovi, Italian cartoonist, dies at age 83.

=== July ===
- July 7: Tadeusz Baranowski, Polish comic book artist (Relax, Super Boom), dies at age 81.
- July 9: Jean-Louis Lechat, Belgian comic book writer, dies at age 83.
- July 12: Chris Scheuer, Austrian comic book author (Epix, Heavy Metal), dies at age 73.
- July 13: Pat Oliphant, Australian-born American cartoonist, dies at age 90.
- July 15: Romano Garofalo, Italian cartoonist, dies at age 84.
- July 21: Mitch Byrd, American comic book artist (Warrior, Green Lantern, Starman, Generation X), dies at age 63.

=== August ===
- August 11: Len Brown, American comic book writer (T.H.U.N.D.E.R. Agents, Mars Attacks), dies at age 84.
- August 14: Brian Holguin, American comic book writer (Aria, Spawn, Mr. Majestic, Cyber Force, Kiss: Psycho Circus), dies at age 61.
- August 18: Dave Lanphear, American comic book artist (The Avengers, Iron Fist, X-O Manowar, Magnus, Robot Fighter), dies at age 58.
- August 19: Ġorġ Mallia, Maltese cartoonist, dies at age 68.
- August 21: Roger McKenzie, American comic book writer (Daredevil, Men of War, Captain America, Ghost Rider), dies at age 75.
- August 24: Will Murray, American writer and comic book writer (Squirrel Girl, Punisher, The Destroyer, Pet Avengers), dies at age 73.
- August 28: Sven-Bertil Bärnarp, Swedish cartoonist, dies at age 86.
- Specific date in August unknown: Nick Bougas, American cartoonist, dies at age 71.

=== September ===
- September 4: Shin'ichi Abe, Japanese manga writer (That Miyoko Asagaya Feeling, AX), dies at age 76.
- September 5: Andy Fish, American comic book artist (Blackwood, Pirates of Mars, The Misadventures of Adam West, Sabrina the Teenage Witch), dies at age 60.
- September 12: Yves Schlirf, Belgian comic editor (Kana), dies at an unknown age.
- September 15: Andy Donato, Canadian cartoonist, dies at age 89.
- September 17: P. C. Vey, American cartoonist, dies at age 70.
- September 22:
  - Rodolphe, French comic book writer (Métal Hurlant, Trent, Robert Sax), dies at age 78.
  - Joshua Cassara, American comics artist (X-Force, Fantastic Four, X-Men, The Avengers), dies at age 48.
- September 26: Jesús Laguardia, Spanish comic book store owner and founder of Ateneo Cómics in Alicante, dies at an unknown age.

=== October ===
- October 3:
  - Masako Watanabe, Japanese manga artist (Big Comic), dies at age 97.
  - Carlos Edgard Herrero, Brazilian comics artist (Disney comics), dies at age 82.
- October 5: Matt Howarth, American comic book artist (Those Annoying Post Bros, Savage Henry, Star Crossed), dies at age 72.
- October 7: Brice Tarvel, French writer and comic book writer (Sylve), dies at age 80.
- October 8: Bob Brynildson, American comic book store owner, dies at age 69.
- October 14: Sanjulián, Spanish cartoonist, dies at age 85.
- October 17: Ryū Murakami, Japanese writer and manga writer (69), dies at age 74.
- October 22: Tetsuya Chiba, Japanese manga artist (Ashita No Joe), dies at age 87.
- October 25: Walter Koenig, American actor and comic book writer (Star Trek, Raver, Things to Come), dies at age 90.
- October 30: Martha Barnes, Argentine comics artist (G.I. Combat), dies at age 94.

=== November ===
- November 8: Louisa Lesage, French cartoonist, dies at age 28.
- November 10: Frédéric Boilet, French cartoonist, dies at age 66.
- November 12: Pierre Bellocq, French-American cartoonist, dies at age 99.
- November 15: Tom Bunk, German cartoonist, dies at age 80.
- November 16: Consol Escarrà i Piera, Spanish comic book artist, dies at an unnkown age.
- November 17:
  - Daphne Clair, New Zealand writer and manga writer (wrote the English translations of Wife to a Stranger, Reckless Endgarment and The Marriage Debt), dies at age 87.
  - Reed Waller, American comic book writer ("Omaha" the Cat Dancer), dies at age 77.
- November 21: Peter Fluck, British cartoonist, dies at age 85.
