= Time Odyssey =

Time Odyssey may refer to:

- Time Odyssey (album), a 1988 album by Vinnie Moore
- A Time Odyssey, a novel series by Arthur C. Clarke and Stephen Baxter
- Saint Seiya: Time Odyssey, a French comic book series

== See also ==
- Cosmos: A Space-Time Odyssey, an American documentary television series
- Odyssey (disambiguation)
- Time (disambiguation)
