= List of Shy chapters =

Shy is written and illustrated by Bukimi Miki. The series was serialized in Akita Shoten's shōnen manga magazine Weekly Shōnen Champion from August 1, 2019, to November 6, 2025. Akita Shoten has collected its chapters into individual tankōbon volumes. The first volume was released on December 6, 2019. As of January 8, 2026, thirty-three volumes have been released.

The manga has been licensed to many countries in Europe starting in 2020: in France by Kana in September 2020, in Germany by Kazé in October 2020, in Spain by Panini Comics in April 2021, and in Italy by Planet Manga in August 2021. In July 2022, at Anime Expo, Yen Press announced that it has licensed the manga for English release in North America.

== Volumes ==
No.	Original release date	Original ISBN	English release date	English ISBN
1	December 6, 2019	978-4-253-21936-5	December 13, 2022	978-1-9753-5237-0
1. "Because I'm Shy" (シャイなので, Shai Nano de); 2. "The Mission of Heroes" (ヒーローの使命, Hīrō no Shimei); 3. "Curse" (呪い, Noroi); 4. "With All My Heart" (ありったけの心で, Arittake no Kokoro de); 5. "I Respect You" (尊敬します, Sonkeishimasu); 6. "Dinner-Table Meeting" (食卓会談, Shokutaku Kaidan)
2	February 7, 2020	978-4-253-21937-2	March 21, 2023	978-1-9753-5239-4
7. "I'll Give It All I've Got" (ガンバって, Ganbatte); 8. "Heartless Person" (心ないひと, Kokoronai Hito); 9. "Get Stronger" (強くなる, Tsuyoku Naru); 10. "I Hate Them" (嫌いよ, Kirai yo); 11. "Light It Up!" (灯をともせ！, Hi o Tomose!); 12. "Revolution in the Department Store" (デパートでかくめい中, Depāto de Kakumei-chū); 13. "In the Extreme Cold" (極寒の中で, Gokkan no Naka de); 14. "Ice Breaker" (砕氷, Saihyō); 15. "Ice White" (氷白, Hyōhaku)
3	May 8, 2020	978-4-253-21948-8	July 18, 2023	978-1-9753-5241-7
16. "Unchained" (アンチェイン, Anchein); 17. "Childhood" (幼さ, Osanasa); 18. "Is Russia Cold?" (ロシアはさむいですか？, Roshia wa Samui desu ka?); 19. "Don't Call Me an Alcoholic" (アルコホリックと呼ばないで, Arukohorikku to Yobanaide); 20. "Surprise" (さぷらいず, Sapuraizu); 21. "Jus' Kiddin'" (なんつって, Nantsutte); 22. "Melee" (混戦, Konsen); 23. "Heart of Hearts" (本心, Honshin); 24. "Frozen Heart" (凍えた心, Kogoeta Kokoro)
4	July 8, 2020	978-4-253-21950-1	September 19, 2023	978-1-9753-5243-1
25. "Lonely Ice and the Small Flame" (淋しい氷と小さな火, Samishī Kōri to Chīsana Hi); 26. "It's Not Cold" (寒くないよ, Samukunai yo); 27. "Dear Mama" (マーマへ, Māma e); 28. "What is Conveyed and That Which Remains" (伝わること、遺るもの, Tsutawaru Koto, Nokoru Mono); 29. "Power for the Next Fight" (次への力, Tsugi e no Chikara); 30. "When I Cough, I Am Not Alone" (せきをすればふたり, Seki o Sureba Futari); 31. "Interview with a Hero" (ひーろーいんたびゅー, Hīrō Intabyū); 32. "Wind from the West" (西よりの風, Nishiyori no Kaze)
5	September 8, 2020	978-4-253-21955-6	December 12, 2023	978-1-9753-5245-5
33. "Secret" (ひみつ, Himitsu); 34. "Heartblade" (心の刃, Kokoro no Yaiba); 35. "The Setting Sun" (日が沈む, Higashizumu); 36. "Night, the Other Side of Dreams" (夜、夢の裏, Yoru, Yume no Ura); 37. "Ninja, Water, and Me" (わたしと、忍と、みずと, Watashi to, Shinobu to, Mizu to); 38. "Cloud in the Dark" (クラウド・イン・ザ・ダーク, Kuraudo in za Dāku); 39. "The Job of a Leader" (リーダーの仕事, Rīdā no Shigoto); 40. "What Has Been Entrusted" (託されたもの, Takusareta Mono); 41. "Incursion" (突入, Totsunyū)
6	December 8, 2020	978-4-253-21958-7	April 16, 2024	978-1-9753-5247-9
42. "Cute Little Lizard" (かわいいトカゲさん, Kawaī Tokage-san); 43. "Manhood" (オトコ, Otoko); 44. "What's Up Ahead?" (一寸先は何?, Itsusunsaki wa Nani?); 45. "Ladies and Whatamacallits" (レディースアンドなんとかさん, Redīsu Ando Nantoka-san); 46. "Answer" (答え, Kotae); 47. "Smile" (笑える, Waraeru); 48. "Is There Any Light?" (光はありや?, Hikari wa Ari ya?); 49. "Nothing Is Permanent" (諸行無常, Shogyōmujō); 50. "Life Is Suffering" (一切皆苦, Issaikaiku)
7	February 8, 2021	978-4-253-21970-9	July 23, 2024	978-1-9753-5249-3
51. "In the Name of Love" (愛ゆえに, Ai Yueni); 52. "Cause and Effect" (因果, Inga); 53. "Don't Disappoint Me" (がっかりさせんで, Gakkari sa Sende); 54. "Woe to Thee!" (うらめしや, Urameshi ya); 55. "Kind Man" (優しい男, Yasashī Otoko); 56. "Shell" (殻, Kara); 57. "Abandon Your Heart" (心を捨てて, Kokoro o Sutete); 58. "The Vagaries of Ai and Mai" (曖昧, Aimai); 59. "Blade in Hand" (刃を手に, Yaiba o Te ni)
8	April 8, 2021	978-4-253-21975-4	October 15, 2024	978-1-9753-5251-6
60. "Purity" (無垢, Muku); 61. "I'll Trust You!" (信じてみる！, Shinjite Miru!); 62. "All Things Lack Self" (諸法無我, Shohōmuga); 63. "The Realm Beyond Ego" (超自我の間, Chōjiga no Ma); 64. "Clumsy" (不器用, Bukiyō); 65. "Outstretched Hand and Chains of Sin" (伸ばした手と罪の鎖, Nobashita Te to Tsumi no Kusari); 66. "I Shan't Forgive!" (許しまへん！, Yurushimahen!); 67. "Holy Mother Bear" (空飛ぶ巨大熊(ホーリーマザーベア), Hōrī Mazā Bea); 68. "It's Open" (開いたよ, Aita yo)
9	June 8, 2021	978-4-253-22043-9	January 21, 2025	978-1-9753-5253-0
69. "Like the Moon Away from the Clouds" (雲を離れた月のように, Kumo o Hanareta Tsuki no Yō ni); 70. "The Moon and the Sun" (お月様とお天道様, Otsukisama to Ootentosama); 71. "Amaterasu" (天照); 72. "Mission Complete" (任務完了, Ninmu Kanryō); 73. "Peace in Enlightenment" (涅槃寂静, Nehan Jakujō); 74. "Fare Thee Well" (どうか元気で, Dō ka Genki de); 75. "Space in the Spaceship" (スペース・イン・ザ・スペースシップ, Supēsu in za Supēsushippu); 76. "My Little Mother" (マイ・リトル・マザー, Mai Ritoru Mazā); 77. "Made in Heart" (メイド・イン・ハート, Meido in Hāto)
10	September 8, 2021	978-4-253-22044-6	May 27, 2025	978-1-9753-5255-4
78. "Untouchable" (アンタチャブル, Antatchaburu); 79. "Standing for Myself" (スタンディング・フォー・マイセルフ, Sutandingu fō Maiserufu); 80. "Standing for Yourself" (スタンディング・フォー・ユアセルフ, Sutandingu fō Yuaserufu); 81. "Hello, Stranger" (ヘロー・ストレーンジャー, Herō Sutorēnjā); 82. "Ghost in the Rain" (ゴースト・イン・ザ・レイン, Gōsuto in za Rein); 83. "Hero's High" (ヒーローズ・ハイ, Hīrōzu Hai); 84. "Till Love Do Us Part" (ティル・ラブ・ドゥ・アス・パート, Tiru Rabu Dū Asu Pāto); 85. "Engagement" (エンゲージメント, Engējimento); 86. "Electric Entry!" (エレクトリック・エントリー！, Erekutorikku Entorī!)
11	November 8, 2021	978-4-253-22045-3	October 28, 2025	979-8-8554-0251-3
87. "Shining Six" (シャイニング・シクス, Shainingu Shikusu); 88. "Before the Storm" (ビフォア・ザ・ストーム, Bifoa za Sutōmu); 89. "Cast a Shadow" (キャスト・ア・シャッドウ, Kyasuto a Shaddō); 90. "Under the Sea" (アンダー・ザ・シー, Andā za Shī); 91. "New Challenger!" (ニュー・チャレンジャー！, Nyū Charenjā!); 92. "We Are in a Rock" (ウィー・アー・イン・ロック！, Uī ā in Rokku!); 93. "I Am Angry" (アイ・アム・アングリー, Ai Amu Angurī); 94. "Gone with the Wind" (ゴーン・ウィズ・ザ・ウィンド, Gōn Uizu za Uindo); 95. "Uninvited" (アンインヴァイテッド, Aninvaiteddo)
12	January 7, 2022	978-4-253-22089-7	February 24, 2026	979-8-8554-0253-7
96. Kurōsu Konbatto! (クロース・コンバット！); 97. Invitēshon tū Anhappī (インヴィテーション・トゥ・アンハッピー); 98. Nevārando (ネヴァーランド); 99. Sukuwarezaru Mono (救われざる者); 100. Hazukashi Garazu ni (恥ずかしがらずに); 101. Onēchan (お姉ちゃん); 102. Aitai (会いたい); 103. Shai Dakara (シャイだから); 104. Musakui, Muchitsujo (無作為、無秩序)
13	March 8, 2022	978-4-253-22095-8	August 25, 2026	979-8-8554-0255-1
105. Sensō o Shiranai Otona-tachi (戦争を知らない大人たち); 106. Kodomo Kakusho o Mōichido (こども白書をもう一度); 107. Shōjo yo (少女よ); 108. Aoharu no Kage (アオハルの影); 109. Ohayōgozaimasu no Sakanaya-san (おはようございますの魚屋さん); 110. Kaijō no Hoshi (海上の星); 111. Aishitakute Yarikirenai (愛したくてやりきれない); 112. Aishiterutte Itte Miro (愛してるって言ってみろ); 113. Ravaburu Nēmu (ラヴアブル ネーム)
14	June 8, 2022	978-4-253-22118-4	March 23, 2027	979-8-8554-0257-5
114. Shōnen Shōjo Jidai (少年少女時代); 115. Konnichiwa, Aka-san (こんにちは赤さん); 116. Kokoro o Kudasai (心をください); 117. Hīrō Nanka Janai (ヒーローなんかじゃない); 118. Watashi no Kuni wa (わたしの国は); 119. Iwan'ya Akunin o Ya (いわんや悪人をや); 120. Wasurenaide (忘れないで); 121. Nuigurumi Tōhikō (ぬいぐるみ逃避行); 122. Sōki no Hashi (想起の橋)
15	August 8, 2022	978-4-253-22119-1	—	—
123. Nevārando e Yōkoso (ネヴァーランドへようこそ); 124. Honō to Ebi no Kānibaru (炎とエビのカーニバル); 125. Kyokutai Hōshutsu (極体放出); 126. Honto no Atashi? (ホントのあたし？); 127. Andā za Burakku Shī (アンダー・ザ・ブラック・シー); 128. Genshitsū (幻肢痛); 129. Okāsama (お母さま); 130. Tsumina Shōjo (罪な少女); 131. Nokku nokku! (ノックノック！)
16	October 6, 2022	978-4-253-28064-8	—	—
132. Son to Uso (存と嘘); 133. Ano Ko no Nannano sa (あの子の何なのさ); 134. Kuro no Hoshi (黒の星); 135. Redi Burakku (レディ・ブラック); 136. Sukāpīku o Koete (傷ヶ峰(スカーピーク)を超えて); 137. Baddoendo no Saki (バッドエンドの先); 138. Odaijini (お大事に); 139. Yasashī Ningyo no Koroshi Kata (やさしい人魚の殺し方); 140. Rein oa Shain (レイン・オア・シャイン)
17	January 6, 2023	978-4-253-28065-5	—	—
141. Heroes; 142. Koisuru Ohime-sama (恋するお姫様); 143. Yoru, Kuru (夜、来る); 144. Kyōfu no Mori (恐怖の森); 145. Kowaku Nante Nai sa (怖くなんてないさ); 146. Hachi-gatsu Sanjūni-nichi (8月32日); 147. Kaidan Mimi Bukuro (怪談みみ袋); 148. Wasureteta Shukudai (忘れてた宿題); 149. Jibun Sensō (自分戦争)
18	March 8, 2023	978-4-253-28066-2	—	—
150. Mae no Karā mo Ominogashinaku (前のカラーもお見逃しなく); 151. SHY: Zenpen (SHY: 前篇); 152. SHY: Kōhen (SHY: 後編); 153. Ikiteru karakoso Hazukashī (生きてるからこそ恥ずかしい); 154. Tanatofobia (絶命恐怖症(タナトフォビア)); 155. Kokorobi (心灯); 156. What a Wonderful Day; 157. Animatoronikusu wa Nakimushi no Yume o Miru ka? (アニマトロニクスは泣き虫の夢を見るか？); 158. Kizu to Nemuri (傷と眠り)
19	May 8, 2023	978-4-253-28067-9	—	—
159. Ikari no Unko Ōkoku (怒りのうんこ王国); 160. Yume no Nuigurumi Ōkoku (夢のぬいぐるみ王国); 161. Hajimatte Sura Inai (始まってすらいない); 162. Nemuri no Naka de (眠りの中で); 163. Tomodachi (ともだち); 164. Kokoro no Sumaho (心のスマホ); 165. Shitto za Wārudo (シット・ザ・ワールド); 166. Minmin (ミンミン); 167. Okorinbo (おこりんぼ)
20	August 8, 2023	978-4-253-28068-6	—	—
168. Ryū to Ryū (龍と竜); 169. Muyū-byō (夢憂病); 170. Yoru, Hikaru. Rei, Nemuru (夜、光る。 龍、眠る); 171. Otokonoko Damono (男の子だもの); 172. Mezame no Mae no Setsuna (目覚めの前の刹那); 173. Bakemono (バクモノ); 174. Doki (ドキ); 175. Minikui Ryū no Ko (醜い竜の子); 176. Kawaī Yatsuna no Sa (カワイイ奴なのさ)
21	October 6, 2023	978-4-253-28069-3	—	—
177. Hoshū (補習); 178. Infekushon (インフェクション); 179. Totonō (ととのう); 180. RE:Turn To School; 181. Tomodachi no Ie no Pinpon o Osu no wa Dokidokisuru (友達の家のピンポンを押すのはドキドキする); 182. Shodō Man Genru (書道マン現る); 183. Koi Betsuriku (恋別離苦); 184. Ōenhi (応援火); 185. Mezameru Kizuato (目覚める傷跡)
22	December 7, 2023	978-4-253-28070-9	—	—
186. Okā-san... (お母さん...); 187. Kyōfu! Chūkan Shiken (恐怖! 中間試験); 188. Fushū (腐臭); 189. Ichitōshō to Rettōshō (一等賞と劣等賞); 190. Yaruki no Aru Mono wa Sare (やる気のあるものは去れ); 191. Koikusa Sensō (恋腐戦争); 192. Dansu Uizu za Gōsuto (ダンス・ウィズ・ ザ・ゴースト); 193. Erabareta Hito to Erabu Hito (選ばれた人と選ぶ人); 194. Mosu to Hīrō (雑魚(モス)と英雄(ヒーロー))
23	February 7, 2024	978-4-253-28071-6	—	—
195. Erabubeki Michi (選ぶべき道); 196. Gakkō ni Tomarou (学校に泊まろう); 197. Tokuhō!! Shai no Shōtai! (特報!! シャイの正体!); 198. Gyaku Hīrō Intabyū (逆ひーろーいんたびゅー); 199. Bungei-bu wa Arayuru Seishun no Gakudan de Aru (文芸部はあらゆる青春の楽団である); 200. Hajimari Hajimari (はじまりはじまり); 201. Shai Toshite (シャイとして); 202. Mahō ni Naru Tame ni (魔法になるために); 203. Itterasshai (いってらっしゃい)
24	May 8, 2024	978-4-253-28072-3	—	—
204. Kiritsu, Rei, Sakebe! (起立、礼、叫べ!); 205. Tabidachi no Hi ni (話:旅立ちの日に); 206. Hīrō no Barādō (英雄(ヒーロー)のバラードー); 207. Yōkoso Suzushiro-mura e (ようこそすずしろ村へ); 208. Rokkoisho (ろっこいしょ); 209. Rōjin to Inu (老人と犬); 210. Wasurenagusa (勿忘草); 211. Pinchi o Chansu ni (ピンチをチャンスに); 212. Taida no Kaidan (怠惰の階段)
25	July 8, 2024	978-4-253-28073-0	—	—
213. Karyūdo no Me (狩人の目); 214. Jinsei Tekitō (人生テキトー); 215. Karada no Kioku (身体の記憶); 216. Roshian Rūretto (ろしあんるーれっと); 217. Osamurai-san (お侍さん); 218. Moshimo Hīrō ga Inakereba (もしも英雄(ヒーロー)がいなければ); 219. Shi ni Sō Nano de (死にそうなので); 220. Ken'oshimasu (嫌悪します); 221. Hajishirazu (恥知らず)
26	September 6, 2024	978-4-253-28074-7	—	—
222. Moshimo Kinō ga Erabete mo (もしも昨日が選べても); 223. Wasurenai (忘れない); 224. Kan'oke (棺桶); 225. Tengoku (天国); 226. Hannin (犯人); 227. Heiki (兵器); 228. Senkō (閃光); 229. Gekitsui (撃墜); 230. Hīrō (英雄(ヒーロー ))
27	December 6, 2024	978-4-253-28075-4	—	—
231. Netamashiki Hīrō-tachi (妬ましき英雄(ヒーロー)たち); 232. Anata no Chikara Janai (あなたの力じゃない); 233. Zamāmiro (ざまあみろ); 234. Gekitotsu (激突); 235. Sūpāhīrō ni Bokura ga Sukueru ka? (スーパーヒーローにぼくらが救えるか?); 236. Sonbīnu (ソンビーヌ); 237. Hitari Suginaide (浸りすぎないで); 238. Nandemonai hito (なんでもない人); 239. Motara Sareta Konran (もたらされた混乱)
28	February 7, 2025	978-4-253-28076-1	—	—
240. Boku wa Anata o Kizutsuketai (僕はあなたを傷つけたい); 241. Kage, Shizumu (影、沈む); 242. Kage, Shinobu (影、忍ぶ); 243. Otona ni Naranaide (大人にならないで); 244. Maki Kami no Anata (巻き髪のあなた); 245. Otoko no Hito (男の人); 246. Atenshon Purīzu (アテンション・プリーズ); 247. Fōru Daun (フォール・ ダウン); 248. Raifu Osu Gēmu (ライフ・オス・ゲーム)
29	May 8, 2025	978-4-253-28077-8	—	—
249. Bihaindo Za Torauma (ビハインド・ザ・トラウマ); 250. Onēchan (お姉ちゃん); 251. Uta (歌); 252. Koi Koi Koi (恋恋恋); 253. Konai (来ない); 254. Kokoro no Kyōshitsu Ritānzu (心の教室リターンズ); 255. Gēmu no Owari (ゲームの終わり); 256. Mōsugu Kurisumasu (もうすぐクリスマス); 257. Tsuki de Nemuru (月で眠る)
30	August 7, 2025	978-4-253-28078-5	—	—
258. Taikiken e (大気圏へ); 259. Kaijū Gokko o Hajimeyou (怪獣ごっこを始めよう); 260. Dare ga Osake o Nonda no ka? (誰がお酒を飲んだのか?); 261. Hōmu Inbējon (ホーム・インベージョン); 262. Chikyū no Hate (地球の果て); 263. Arashi no Nise Tsukiyo (嵐の偽月夜); 264. Kōiu Toki wa Waraunda (こういう時は笑うんだ); 265. Teru-chan wa Hitori dake (テルちゃんはひとりだけ); 266. Teru-chan ga Ippai! (テルちゃんがいっぱい!)
31	October 8, 2025	978-4-253-00445-9	—	—
267. Uchūsen Kyūnan Kokoro-gō (宇宙船救難心号); 268. Kokoro no Ofuro! (心のお風呂!); 269. Wasurerareta Kurisumasu (忘れられたクリスマス); 270. Getsuei Kōrin (月影光輪); 271. Masshirona Ehon (まっしろな絵本); 272. Maō Gokko (魔王ごっこ); 273. Nante Koto wa Nai (なんてことはない); 274. Jiyū to wa (自由とは); 275. Dōdemo Ī Nā (どうでもいいなあ)
32	December 8, 2025	978-4-253-00893-8	—	—
276. Hirogaru Hidane (広がる火種); 277. Kinkyū Haishin (緊急配信); 278. Watashi Ryūseigun (ワタシ流星群); 279. Hikaritokage (ヒカリトカゲ); 280. Kusodeka Kuma-chan (クソデカくまちゃん); 281. The Hour of Joy; 282. Toy the Loss; 283. Nade Nade Daddy; 284. Happy KFF Day
33	January 8, 2026	978-4-253-00967-6	—	—
285. Otsuki-sama o Uchikaeshite (お月様を打ち返して); 286. Nakanaori (なかなおり); 287. Hajimari no Maru (始まりのまる); 288. Yume no Tsudzuki (夢の都月); 289. Tsuki to Tomo ni Sarinu (月と共に去りぬ); 290. Kon'na Toko ni Ita (こんなとこにいた); 291. Murasaki Suzuri no Haji Koi (紫すずりの恥恋); 292. Sora ga Aoku Mieru no Wa (空が青く見えるのは); 293. Save & Heal Yourself
