= What a Wonderful World! =

Japanese manga series by Inio Asano

- The cover of the first volume of What a Wonderful World!, featuring a gangster on the run from the story "The Bear from the Forest"

素晴らしい世界 (Subarashii Sekai)
- Genre: Comedy, slice of life
- Manga
- Written by: Inio Asano
- Published by: Shogakukan
- English publisher: Viz Media
- Magazine: Monthly Sunday Gene-X
- Original run: June 2002 – April 2004
- Volumes: 2

What a Wonderful World! (Japanese: 素晴らしい世界, Hepburn: Subarashii Sekai) is a Japanese manga series written and illustrated by Inio Asano. It consists of loosely connected short stories about young adults in modern Japan and their life decisions. The manga was serialized in Shogakukan's seinen manga magazine Monthly Sunday Gene-X from 2002 to 2004 and is licensed in North America by Viz Media.

== Release ==
The manga was serialized in the Japanese manga magazine Monthly Sunday Gene-X by Shogakukan from the June 2002 to April 2004 issues. Shogakukan collected the 19 chapters into two volumes from May 19, 2003, to May 19, 2004. Shogakukan also included the manga in a collection of Asano's original works in 2010. The series was licensed in North America by Viz Media in February 2009, with both volumes published on October 20, 2009. The manga has also been published in France by Kana, in Germany by Egmont Manga & Anime, and Tokyopop Germany (republisher), and in Taiwan by Taiwan Tohan. Asano wrote a sequel to the 11th story "After the Rain" in the August 2008 issue of Monthly Sunday Gene-X titled "What a Wonderful World", which was also collected in Before Dawn and the End of the World.

== Reception ==
Reviewers have praised Asano's art and writing, but noted the limitations of the short story format for character development as well as Asano's overuse of character tropes. About.com's Shaenon Garrity called it an excellent debut work which, while not as good as Asano's later works and lacking in some stories, has great art and writing. Deb Aoki called the manga "mysterious, humorous, magical and tragic all at the same time," adding that it "remind[s] us that living can be the greatest adventure of all." Grant Goodman of PopCultureShock called the manga unique and solid, but felt that half of the chapters were not memorable and that the theme of "life's losers" made the stories feel repetitive and predictable. Carlo Santos of Anime News Network complimented the stories that were slightly surreal as well as Asano's penwork, but disliked the "woe-is-me" facet of the stories. David Welsh of The Comics Reporter disliked the use of overdone tropes in the stories, but praised the design of average-looking characters and the page composition, finding the stories "polished and effective," but not "linger[ing] in the mind". Johanna Carlson of Comics Worth Reading found the traits of the characters to be annoying but said that the detailed and expressive art grounded the story, making it more believable. Leroy Douresseaux of ComicBookBin praised Asano's ability to depict the struggles of young people in the first volume, but felt that this was downplayed by the large number of characters. He called Asano's ability to "balance and compare and contrast what is celebrated and what is ridiculous about life" the most engaging part of the second volume. Publishers Weekly found that Asano's characters were "prone to platitudes" but not as much as in Solanin, with the shorter stories also making the characters more sympathetic, and called the artwork and storytelling attractive. Al Sparrow of IGN noted the theme of survival in the stories, remarking that Asano portrays youth through an unfiltered lens. Greg McElhatton of Read About Comics found the stories to vary in quality, but called the manga charming and described the art as a "beautifully delicate creation".
