= Nijigahara Holograph =

Japanese manga series by Inio Asano

- The cover of Nijigahara Holograph, featuring butterflies fluttering past long grass

虹ヶ原ホログラフ (Nijigahara Horogurafu)
- Genre: Psychological horror
- Manga
- Written by: Inio Asano
- Published by: Ohta Publishing
- English publisher: NA: Fantagraphics Books
- Magazine: QuickJapan
- Original run: November 2003 – December 2005
- Volumes: 1

Nijigahara Holograph (Japanese: 虹ヶ原ホログラフ, Hepburn: Nijigahara Horogurafu; lit. 'Rainbow Field Holograph') is a Japanese manga series written and illustrated by Inio Asano. It is about the events that occur after a girl is thrown into a well by her classmates and their lives afterwards. The manga was serialized in Ohta Publishing's Quick Japan magazine from 2003 to 2005. It is licensed in North America by Fantagraphics Books.

== Plot ==
The story jumps back and forth between years and events, allowing the reader to piece together how the nonlinear events are correlated.

The focal point of the story is the character Arie Kimura, a pretty fifth grade student with pale skin and long hair. She enjoys telling her classmates a scary fairy tale in which a girl is sent by God to warn a village of a monster that will destroy them. The villagers fear her predictions, and seven of them decide to sacrifice her to appease the monster. The girl is reborn over and over, doomed to repeat the cycle, with the monster growing larger every time due to its stomach getting fuller with bodies. This fairy tale foreshadows the general structure of the manga.

Arie claims the monster hides in Nijigahara tunnel, a dark tunnel close to their school. The students' teacher, Sakaki, explains that the Nijigahara embankment was named for a legend about a kudan, a "cow with a human face" known to predict plagues and suffering before mysteriously dying. Arie's classmates bully her, disturbed by her tale while also repressing their own individual personal problems, and seven of them eventually push Arie down a well leading into Nijigahara tunnel to appease the "monster," mirroring the fairy tale. The children convince the adults that it was an accident, and Arie ends up comatose and stays this way for the majority of the story. Shortly after, ominous glowing cabbage butterflies begin to swarm the town. Arie's classmates grow up and try to move on with their lives, but still find themselves haunted by the incident and the guilt of their actions. They are plagued by internal monsters: guilt, pain, trauma, etc., and are unable to rid themselves of their painful memories and deeds. These repressed emotions continue to have an influence throughout their lives in all timeline versions of themselves, whether they appear as adults, parents, or old people.

== Major characters ==
Some of the major characters affected by their actions directly or indirectly inflicted upon Arie include:

- Kohta Komatsuzaki (also romanized as "Kouta" in some translations): a bully who had an obsessive crush on Arie and is plagued with guilt over not being able to protect her. He is ultimately consumed by pain and anger over losing her (to bullying at that). As he grows up, Kohta becomes more violent, physically taking out his unconscious anger on the people around him. As an adult, Kohta works at a supermarket, along with Arie's father. He frequently visits Nijigahara and occasionally hangs out in the well below.
- Hayato Wakamatsu: a fellow bully who was friends with Kohta. He was one of the children who pushed Arie into the well that day. This unconsciously creates a strain in Hayato and Kohta's friendship, with Kohta going so far as to cut Hayato's face with his switchblade during a fight, and Hayato retaliating by smashing Kohta's head with a cinderblock and throwing him down the same well where Arie was thrown. The incident left Kohta mentally disturbed, and led to him being frequently hospitalized as an adult. Hayato grows up to become a policeman, marked by a scar on his face from Kohta's attack.
- Kyoko Sakaki: the students' fifth grade teacher during the year Arie was thrown into the well. Prior to these events, Sakaki once saw a man raping Arie in a field, and tried to stop him. In defense, the man grabbed a cinderblock and struck her in the eye, an injury that led to blindness. Bitter about the incident, Sakaki vowed to never get involved in the children's affairs, and thus did not intervene during the time Arie was being bullied, even though she was aware of it and strongly believes the well incident was an act of bullying rather than an accident. She married a fellow teacher and had a pair of twins, but having repressed emotions of anger and guilt made her hate her family and become abusive to her children. She ends up divorcing her husband and neglecting her children.
- Father Kimura: Arie's father. He is a loser of a man. It is stated that his wife left him and Arie for another man six years prior to the events of the manga. The mother's dead body was found near Nijigahara tunnel prior to Arie's incident at the well. Throughout her childhood, Arie's father regularly raped her, as she reminded him of his wife. In the present timeline, he worked at the same supermarket as Kohta until Kohta stabbed him in the neck with a knife from the store, leaving him hospitalized. He shows remorse for his treatment of Arie and seems to be waiting for fate to bestow some type of punishment upon him.
- Amahiko Suzuki: an extremely suicidal and depressed boy, having tried to commit suicide multiple times during his childhood, which caused him to change schools often. He is emotionally neglected by his foster parents, with his stepmother going so far as to tell him to die. The only people who showed him affection were Sakaki and his classmate Higure Narumi, who had a crush on him. During one of the timelines, he assaults and attempts to rape and murder Arie, at which point he learns that Arie is his biological sister. As an adult Suzuki is still depressed, and spends his time having existential crises and caring for his cancer-ridden father.
- Narumi Higure: Narumi was in the same class as Arie and the others. She was a very quiet and obedient student, preferring to observe her classmates and write notes in her diary instead. Narumi had a crush on Suzuki, and was one of the few people who truly cared for him. She actively tried to make him a better person with things like inviting him to her house to play video games and preventing him from bullying another student. She was the younger sister of Makoto, and was murdered by him when he intentionally started a house fire.
- Makoto Higure: the older brother of Narumi. On the surface he appears friendly and carefree, but he is actually an extremely dangerous and demented person. As a child, it is implied that he often abused Narumi, and eventually murdered her along with his parents in an intentional house fire. When Arie was younger, she befriended Makoto and would meet with him every day to write out the fairy tale of the monster. Makoto became obsessed with Arie and one day raped her in a field. He was the man who blinded Sakaki during her attempts to stop him. It is hinted that Kohta may have seen him running away from the incident. Makoto was never caught for his crimes, but he is haunted by his actions and his loss of Arie, who never came to see him again after the assault. As an adult, he is the owner of Prism Cafe and is Maki's boss. The symbolic item associated with him is an umbrella, as he was carrying one the day he raped Arie. Makoto is later murdered by Kohta by being stabbed through the heart with an umbrella.
- Maki Arakawa: a jealous girl in Arie's class, and arguably the one who set off the chain of events leaving Arie in a coma. Maki had a deep crush on Kohta since childhood, but he did not reciprocate her feelings because he was in love with Arie. Out of revenge, Maki became the main perpetrator of Arie's well incident. As an adult, she is shown to be cold and manipulative, attempting to use men for her emotional needs and fairly fickle in relationships. She aspires to be a painter, but her emotional coldness is symbolized in her failed art career, as her art patrons complain about a lack of emotion in her work. Thus she works part-time at Cafe Prism, with Makoto as her boss. In adulthood she finally seduces Kohta into a relationship, her wish to be with him finally coming true, or so she thinks. In reality, Kohta at this point is so mentally disturbed by the events of the past and suppressed anger that he is emotionally gone, to the point where he hourly forgets who Maki even is or that they are even in a relationship. Though he had a few casual sexual encounters with Maki, he does not love her and is still aware of her involvement in Arie's death, making Maki's crime against Arie a useless act of violence since she will never have Kohta's love. Maki eventually becomes disturbed by Kohta's obsession and comfort of hanging around Nijigahara tunnel. While depressed about Kohta, Maki begins a relationship with Makoto, thinking she has found some peace with him. In reality Makoto does not love Maki either, and possibly agreed to the short relationship to fill the void and obsession he feels for Arie. During an obsessive tirade comparing how Maki is pathetic compared to Arie, Makoto attempts to assault Maki in the same field where he raped Arie. Maki is saved when Kohta, who had been hanging out in Nijigahara tunnel, murders Makoto. While Maki committed her violence against Arie out of vengeance for love, she ultimately did not find love from anyone.

== Release ==
The manga was serialized in the Japanese manga magazine Quick Japan by Ohta Publishing from November 2003 to December 2005. Ohta Publishing collected the 13 chapters into a single volume on July 25, 2006. Fantagraphics Books announced that it had licensed the manga in North America on January 1, 2013. Fantagraphics noted that the manga would be darker than their previous two releases, but still be part of their initiative to publish "unique artistic voices," adding that it would be translated by Rachel Thorn. The manga was subsequently published on March 19, 2014. The manga has also been published in France by Panini Comics, in Spain by Ponent Mon, and Milky Way Ediciones (republisher), in Italy by Panini Comics, in Germany by Tokyopop Germany, in Brazil by JBC, in Serbia by Lokomotiva, in Ukraine by MAL'OPUS, and in Taiwan by Taiwan Tohan.

== Reception ==
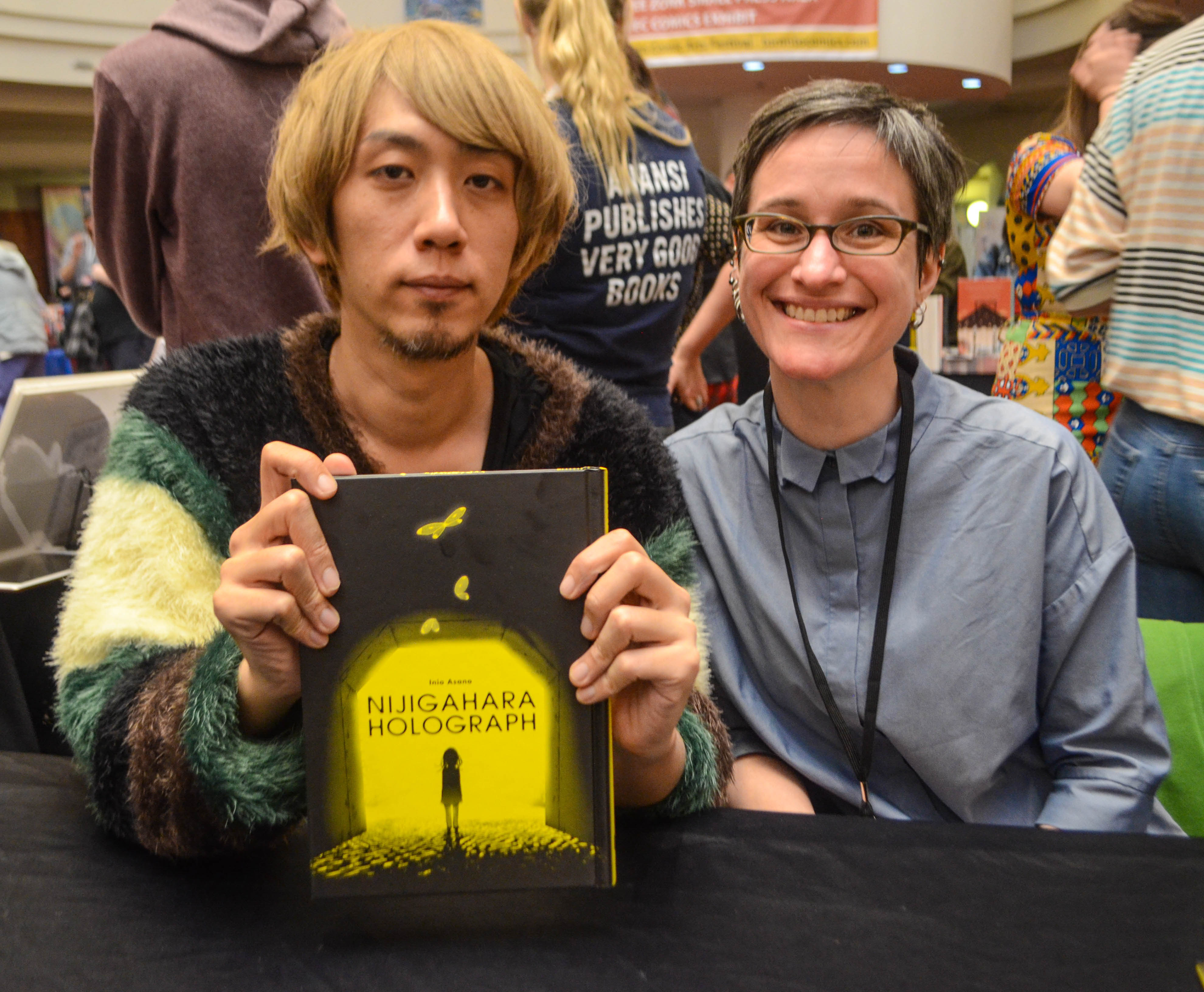
Asano at Toronto Comic Arts Festival 2018, holding a copy of the Fantagraphics translation of the manga

Jason Thompson of Anime News Network found the manga to be confusing and dark, but said: "manga is about flow, but it takes skill to play with that flow as much as Inio Asano does in Nijigahara." He also likened the manga's portrayal of the dark sides of people to David Lynch's films. Comparing the manga to Asano's previous works, Johanna Carlson of Comics Worth Reading said that it has "the same strong focus on character, but with much more emphasis on the creepy and violently destructive." She concluded that "the complex, multi-layered storytelling rewards attention." Ng Suat Tong of The Hooded Utilitarian felt that the quality of the manga which required looking at it as a whole was atypical in the industry, which emphasizes ease of reading. They called the manga as a whole "a marvel of narrative needlework and one of the best comics to have been translated in recent years." In a starred review, Publishers Weekly called the manga a "dark and twisted psychological horror story" which is "equal parts beautiful and highly disturbing", adding that it is "impressive and will leave readers puzzling about it, with many likely returning to dig deeper and discover further meanings." Hillary Brown of Paste compared the manga to the film The Butterfly Effect, finding the manga more favorable, saying: "the book is interesting—even as it frustrates—with its complicated timelines and penchant for big reveals." Laura Hudson of Wired called it a "haunting graphic novel", categorizing it as a horror story, saying: "it's not a particularly easy story, or a nice one, but it is unflinching and beautiful." Oliver Sava of The A.V. Club described it as "a challenging title that forces the reader to confront terrifying situations without offering much comfort afterward", concluding that "Asano's skill delivers a haunting story that ultimately delivers substantial rewards, even with its unsolved mysteries." Kevin Church of Comics Alliance found that the story did not feel cheap, "even with the unrelenting bleakness of the narrative" due to Arié's impact on the lives around her. He also complimented the story's focus, its balanced symbolism, and Asano's detailed art and depiction of facial emotion. Lastly, he found the manga much more difficult than Solanin, but called it a worthwhile challenge that "carries a palpable dread that will haunt you well after you put it down." David Berry of the National Post found fault in Asano's over-indulgence in implying that everything in the manga is connected, but called the story "one that can still capture a unique moment with piercing emotionality, leaving feelings lingering like evening shadows."

The manga charted on The New York Times Manga Best Sellers list, being the sixth best-selling manga for the week ending on March 8, 2014. The manga was nominated for the 2014 Diamond Gem Awards—which are selected by comic book retailers based on sales—for the category Manga Trade Paperback of the Year. Paul Gravett listed the manga as his tenth top manga of 2014, sharing the spot with one other work.
