= Downfall (manga) =

Japanese manga series

- Tankōbon volume cover

零落 (Reiraku)
- Genre: Drama
- Manga
- Written by: Inio Asano
- Published by: Shogakukan
- English publisher: NA: Viz Media
- Magazine: Big Comic Superior
- Original run: March 10, 2017 – July 28, 2017
- Volumes: 1
- Live-action film
- Directed by: Naoto Takenaka
- Written by: Yutaka Kuramochi
- Music by: Ryohei Shima
- Studio: Django Films
- Released: March 17, 2023
- Runtime: 128 minutes
- icon

Downfall (Japanese: 零落, Hepburn: Reiraku) is a Japanese manga series written and illustrated by Inio Asano. It was serialized in Shogakukan's seinen manga magazine Big Comic Superior from March to July 2017, with its chapters collected in a single tankōbon volume. A live action film adaptation premiered in March 2023.

== Premise ==
The series centers on Kaoru Fukazawa, a manga writer and artist who has just completed his successful series Goodnight Sunset. Following this, his life begins to fall apart. He has run out of ideas, he is divorcing his wife, he strikes up an unusual friendship with an escort, and he begins to feel detached from the manga industry and sees readers as consumers of trash and believes the only important thing is making money.

== Media ==
=== Manga ===
Written and illustrated by Inio Asano, Downfall was serialized in Shogakukan's seinen manga magazine Big Comic Superior from March 10 to July 28, 2017. Shogakukan collected its chapters in a single tankōbon volume, released on October 30, 2017.

In North America, the manga was licensed for English release by Viz Media. The volume was released on February 18, 2020.

No.	Original release date	Original ISBN	English release date	English ISBN
1	October 30, 2017	978-4-09-189745-9	February 18, 2020	978-1-9747-0936-6

=== Live-action film ===
In October 2022, it was announced that the manga would receive a live action film adaptation, premiered in Japan on March 17, 2023. It was directed by Naoto Takenaka, starring Takumi Saitoh as Kaoru Fukusawa, Shuri as Chifuyu and Megumi as Nozomi Machida.

== Reception ==
The manga debuted at 27th place on Oricon's weekly chart of the best-selling manga, with 27,953 copies sold. The series ranked twelfth, alongside 1122: For a Happy Marriage, on "The Best Manga 2018 Kono Manga wo Yome!" ranking by Freestyle magazine.
