= Goodnight Punpun =

Japanese manga series by Inio Asano

- First tankōbon volume cover, featuring Punpun Onodera

おやすみプンプン (Oyasumi Punpun)
- Genre: Coming-of-age; Drama; Slice of life
- Manga
- Written by: Inio Asano
- Published by: Shogakukan
- English publisher: NA: Viz Media
- Magazine: Weekly Young Sunday; (March 15, 2007 – July 31, 2008); Weekly Big Comic Spirits; (October 20, 2008 – November 2, 2013)
- Original run: March 15, 2007 – November 2, 2013
- Volumes: 13
- icon

Goodnight Punpun (Japanese: おやすみプンプン, Hepburn: Oyasumi Punpun) is a Japanese manga series written and illustrated by Inio Asano. It was initially serialized in Shogakukan's seinen manga magazine Weekly Young Sunday between 2007 and 2008, and was later transferred to Weekly Big Comic Spirits, where it ran from 2008 to 2013. Its chapters were collected in 13 tankōbon volumes. In North America, it was licensed for English release by Viz Media.

The series follows the life of Punpun Onodera, from his elementary school years to his early 20s, as he copes with his dysfunctional family, love life, friends, life goals, and hyperactive mind, while occasionally focusing on the lives and struggles of his schoolmates and family. Punpun and the members of his family are normal humans, but are depicted to the reader in the form of crudely drawn birds. The manga explores themes such as depression, love, trauma, social isolation, death, and family.

== Summary ==
Goodnight Punpun primarily focuses on the life experiences of Punpun Onodera, a young boy living in Japan, as well as a few of his friends. The story follows Punpun as he grows up, dividing it into approximately four stages of his life: elementary school, middle school, high school, and his early twenties.

== Characters ==
Punpun Onodera (小野寺 プンプン, Onodera Punpun) / Punpun Punyama (プン山 プンプン, Punyama Punpun)
A young boy who is most often depicted as a bird, although he is also shown in other forms as his character evolves. When he is feeling confused about life or depressed, he consults "God" using a chant his uncle taught him.
Aiko Tanaka (田中 愛子, Tanaka Aiko)
Punpun's primary love interest. Early on, she suggests that she and Punpun run away to Kagoshima. She occasionally takes on the last name Orihara (織原).
God (神, Kami; literally God)
A being, displayed as a photographic afro head, that often appears in front of Punpun in his times of need (Punpun "summons" him by saying, "Dear God, Tinkle Tinkle hoy" (神様神様チンクルホイ, Kamisama Kamisama Chinkuru hoi).
Mama Punpun
Punpun's mother, depressed and suffering from mood swings and anger issues. She has a very conflicted relationship with Punpun, to whom she gives her last name, Onodera, after she and Punpun's father get divorced.
Yūichi Onodera (小野寺 雄一, Onodera Yūichi)
Punpun's uncle, a 30-something freeter. Yūichi takes care of Punpun while his mother is in the hospital.
Midori Ōkuma (大隈 翠, Ōkuma Midori)
Yūichi's girlfriend, who runs a cafe. She briefly joins Punpun's family during middle school and helps take care of him and his family.
Sachi Nanjō (南条 幸, Nanjō Sachi)
A young woman Punpun meets in his young adult life. She is an aspiring manga artist who becomes one of Punpun's close friends.
Masumi Seki (関 真澄, Seki Masumi)
One of Punpun's childhood friends, who is a close companion of Shimizu. He is cynical and aloof, but cares deeply for Shimizu.
Kō Shimizu (清水 コー, Shimizu Kō)
One of Punpun's childhood friends. Shimizu has a wild imagination and depends on Seki. He later joins Pegasus' cult.
Toshiki Hoshikawa (星川 敏樹, Hoshikawa Toshiki) / Pegasus
The leader of a cult revolving around Akashic records in Punpun's city, and a recurring side character.
Mitsuko Tanaka (田中 光子, Tanaka Mitsuko)
Aiko's stepmother. A cult member, she is cruel and abusive to her stepdaughter and shows signs of mental instability. Though she ends up crippled, later chapters reveal this was an act.
Heiroku Shishido (宍戸平六, Shishido Heiroku)
Punpun's landlord, who becomes his friend.
Shuntarō Harumi (晴見俊太郎, Harumi Shuntaro)
One of Punpun's childhood friends. He becomes an elementary school teacher.

== Production ==
Asano announced the manga a year after finishing Solanin. Encouraged by its success, Asano said he was done with "feel-good stories". Despite initial opposition from his editor and publisher, he went through with the manga. Tokie Komuro, the editor-in-chief of Monthly Sunday Gene-X, who is a supporter of Asano, said that the only reason Asano was able to serialize the manga was due to his good track record and reputation from his earlier works.

I wanted [to] take the readers coming to the book because they thought Punpun was cute, and upset them. (Laugh) I wanted to say to the reader, "Here's a different kind of manga. Look at what kind of depths of reality manga can plumb."

— Inio Asano

When he initially planned the story, Asano intended to chronicle Punpun's growth over ten years, spanning seven volumes. The first half was designed to be a romance, and the second half, when Punpun and Aiko go on the run, was reminiscent of a road movie. The manga expanded to thirteen volumes because Asano wanted to focus on the art, and many characters developed their own side stories. Asano purposely emphasized elements of the first half, such as its silliness, to increase the shock of the second half. With every dark turn in the manga, sales dropped, which Asano regretted because his readers were being alienated from the story. He also saw his readers as an enemy when he received criticism, which led him to react harshly and cause more backlash. The manga also served as an outlet for Asano's doubts and fears, such as the fear that he might be a victim or perpetrator of murder.

When designing Punpun, Asano sought to strike a balance between making his male protagonist too handsome or too ugly, and decided to let readers imagine his face. Asano originally planned to depict all the characters like Punpun's family, but his editor did not like the idea. Asano utilized photography and computer graphics for the backgrounds of the manga. Outdoor backgrounds were created by taking photographs, converting them to black and white, and printing them so that his assistants could draw outlines and objects on them. Interiors were created in 3D modeling software, which had the benefit of capturing angles impossible with cameras. When asked why he placed so much emphasis on the backgrounds, Asano said that it allows the drawings to have more impact, especially since characters like Punpun are lacking in dynamism. Asano later came to regret digitally processing his images because he felt he was ruining his pen art.

== Themes ==
Punpun's depiction as a faceless caricature was meant to help readers identify with Punpun and encourage them to keep reading, both when he was depicted as a bird and in his later forms. Asano also utilized Punpun's simple look for symbolism, such as giving him bull horns to represent Altair, the cowherd star, symbolizing his love triangle as part of the Summer Triangle, with Aiko as Vega and Sachi as Deneb.

Asano described the young Punpun as a fundamentalist, which later led to his regrets and dislike of gray areas. Asano also ascribed these characteristics to the other characters: "The main characters in Punpun always remain children in the way their purity leads them to fail and become social misfits." At the end of the manga, Asano originally intended for Punpun to die while saving a friend's child, but he felt that it was too "clean" an ending. He continued the theme of nothing going right for Punpun by making him live and by denying Punpun solitude after Aiko's death by pairing him up with Sachi. In the final chapter, Punpun's experiences are contrasted with those of his childhood friend Harumi to show Punpun from the perspective of a normal person. Harumi sees Punpun surrounded by friends, but in reality, nothing went right for him, further emphasizing the theme of failure.

In terms of genres, Asano disliked the labeling of the manga as an "utsumanga" (depressing manga) or "surreal," which he felt pigeonholed the manga. Since the manga was serialized in a seinen magazine, Asano created the manga for readers who could accept immorality rather than see the protagonist as a role model.

== Release ==
Written and illustrated by Inio Asano, Goodnight Punpun was first serialized in Shogakukan's Weekly Young Sunday from March 15, 2007, until July 31, 2008, when the magazine ceased its publication. It was then transferred to Weekly Big Comic Spirits, where it was published from October 20, 2008, to November 2, 2013. Shogakukan compiled the 147 chapters into thirteen volumes between August 3, 2007, and December 27, 2013. Some of these volumes have been sold as limited special editions, complete with extras such as a phone strap, T-shirt, colored pencil set featuring figures, and lensless glasses.

In July 2015, Viz Media announced at Otakon that they had licensed the manga and would be releasing it in seven omnibus volumes, with the first volume published on March 15, 2016, and the last one on September 19, 2017.

=== Volumes ===
No.	Original release date	Original ISBN	English release date	English ISBN
1	August 3, 2007	978-4-09-151218-5	March 15, 2016	978-1-4215-8620-5
Aiko Tanaka transfers into Punpun Punyama's elementary school class, and they develop a liking for each other. At home, Punpun walks into what looks like the aftermath of his father abusing his mother. While she stays in the hospital and his father is away, her brother, Yūichi Onodera, comes to live with Punpun. Punpun also learns that Aiko's mother sells miracle water, and he makes a promise with Aiko to take her away to her uncle in Kagoshima. Punpun and his friends watch a porn cassette and stumble upon a taped-over confession from a man who has murdered his family, requesting that they locate the bodies and a reward. Punpun and his friends, along with Aiko, visit the abandoned miso factory mentioned in the video.
2	December 28, 2007	978-4-09-151259-8	March 15, 2016	978-1-4215-8620-5
At the factory, they meet a girl, but don't find anything. However, on the roof of the last building, they see the silhouette of a man. Most of the group flees, except Aiko, who gets knocked out, and Punpun, who stays with her. At the same time, a cigarette that Seki had smoked caused a fire. The man approaches them, Punpun's life flashes before his eyes, and he faints, with the fire having been put out by rain. As the semester ends, Punpun dreads having to face Aiko after not being able to grant her wish. On the last day, she asks him to meet her later. However, Punpun finds out that his mother had jumped off her hospital balcony and instead visits her. Punpun spends the rest of the summer depressed and secluded, and when school starts again, Aiko ignores him. Punpun's parents get divorced, and he vows to become an adult. Two years later, in middle school, Aiko is dating Yaguchi, the captain of the badminton club, and Punpun still has feelings for her.
3	June 5, 2008	978-4-09-151333-5	June 21, 2016	978-1-4215-8621-2
Saving him from bullies, Seki becomes closer to Shimizu. One day, when Punpun skips practice, Yaguchi befriends him. In badminton, Punpun's friend Komatsu starts to dominate Yaguichi, who is also suffering from Achilles tendinitis. When Punpun confides his feelings for Aiko to Yaguichi, who is torn between his sports career and her, Yaguichi wagers his relationship with Aiko over the result of the upcoming tournament. Yūichi meets Midori, a worker at a coffee shop, who asks him out. Although they get along, Yūichi holds guilt from a past relationship and tries to drive Midori away, but she demands to learn about his past. Yūichi recounts how, five years ago, he was teaching at a pottery workshop and went on a date with the high school-age daughter of one of his students. She revealed to Yūichi that after having had an abortion, she was being kept under house arrest by her mother and requested Yūichi's help.
4	January 30, 2009	978-4-09-151413-4	June 21, 2016	978-1-4215-8621-2
Yūichi took the girl to his apartment, and they almost had sex, but Yūichi resisted because he knew he couldn't help the girl. When Yūichi returned to work after two weeks, his coworker Washio attacked the girl's mother with a hammer. As Yūichi ran outside to find a police officer, he met the girl, who revealed that she had seduced Washio into the act. Midori takes Yūichi to the workshop with her, and they learn that everyone involved in the incident is doing better now. With his guilt lifted and feeling no more ties to the world, Yūichi attempts suicide by sitting in front of an oncoming train, but stops at the last minute. He and Midori commit to each other. At the badminton tournament, Yaguichi and Komatsu are the finalists, and Yaguichi takes a lead. Punpun meets Aiko, who tells him that she only wants to love someone who is entirely devoted to her and can take her away. Yaguichi's leg gives out, and he concedes defeat to Punpun. However, when Aiko asks Punpun to leave with her for Kagoshima, he refuses. Punpun becomes depressed and reclusive. Two years later, Midori has become close to the Onodera family, and they prepare to move to a new apartment, but Yūichi has been missing for over a week.
5	June 30, 2009	978-4-09-151430-1	September 20, 2016	978-1-4215-8622-9
Having studied hard, Punpun enters high school. Midori is now running the coffee shop herself, and Yūichi's disappearance takes its toll on her. Yūichi had returned to work at the pottery workshop, but after he had an affair with a student, the woman's ex-husband demanded an exorbitant payment from him. Midori starts to rely on Punpun for comfort, and one day at the coffee shop, she rapes Punpun. Seki, needing money, decides to take on odd jobs alongside Shimizu. A property manager asks Shimizu to help clean out an apartment where a man died, but he backs out. A woman hires Seki to murder her ex-boyfriend, but Seki changes his mind when he notices the nice weather. Seki and Shimizu become more determined to stick together. Punpun goes to karaoke with classmates, but doesn't enjoy it at all, leaving with a girl named Kanie, whom he asks out on a date. After learning about the death of his grandfather, Punpun and his mother visit his home in Ōfuna, where he discovers from Midori that Yūichi had returned home and the two had gotten married. While returning home, Punpun's mother becomes irritated with him and tells him not to return until the following day because she has a man over.
6	December 26, 2009	978-4-09-151479-0	September 20, 2016	978-1-4215-8622-9
Punpun's mother is having an affair with a married man. She suffers from a panic attack and, while threatening to kill herself, is suddenly afflicted with pneumothorax, becoming hospitalized. She befriends Harumi, whose girlfriend is in the hospital, and the pair discuss their problems, including her difficulty in connecting with her son. On his date with Kanie, Punpun visits an art gallery. Punpun tries hard to win her over, but they don't form a connection. As their date comes to an end, and Kanie calls him narcissistic, Punpun forcibly tries to kiss her and is slapped. As she is being discharged from the hospital, Punpun's mother tries to find Harumi, whom she has developed a fondness for, only to discover that he has just left. Returning home, she finds Punpun still cold towards her and cannot help but lash out at him. On a return appointment, Punpun's mother discovers that she has aggressive cancer. Two years later, Punpun's mother is on her deathbed and apologizes to Punpun for how she treated him, saying that she loves him.
7	September 30, 2010	978-4-09-151499-8	December 20, 2016	978-1-4215-8623-6
Punpun's father visits him and asks him if he would like to live with him, but Punpun declines. After Punpun graduates from high school, he works part-time jobs with his friend Mimura. On the train ride home, he spots Aiko, but is unable to find her when doubling back. Punpun moves into an apartment near the station where he saw her, hoping to find her again. After failing to find success, Punpun stops going outside and becomes reserved. His landlord, Shishido, who is worried about him, tries to offer him help. He takes him to a bar, where Punpun meets Sachi, whom he had met at an art gallery on his date with Kanie. Sachi tells Punpun that she wants to illustrate a story he wrote in her guest book.
8	February 26, 2011	978-4-09-151510-0	December 20, 2016	978-1-4215-8623-6
Sachi spots Punpun while he is out searching, and he goes to her house again. There, he opens up to her about his issues, and Sachi accuses him of not actually wanting to find Aiko. After she pushes him, Punpun writes her a draft manuscript, which she finds unsatisfactory. Sachi confides in Punpun that she used to be unconfident like him, too, and got cosmetic surgery, so she has to keep pressuring him to try. Punpun resolves to continue working on the story, and they work towards a final draft by the end of the summer. Shishido offers to give Punpun a job once he gets a real estate license. After a misunderstanding, Punpun reveals to Sachi that he loves her, the two have sex, and they start growing closer. A year later, Sachi finishes the manga and prepares to show it to a publisher with Punpun.
9	October 28, 2011	978-4-09-151529-2	March 21, 2017	978-1-4215-8624-3
The publisher is unconvinced by Sachi and Punpun's manga, disliking the main character's "needless" depression. While Shishido gets badly injured after being mistaken for a shoplifter and ends up paralyzed for life, Punpun's childhood friends Seki and Shimizu, who stayed very close, drift apart as Shimizu joins a cult led by the mysterious and exuberant Pegasus. Punpun, having distanced himself from Sachi, who is now continuing the manga on her own, starts using a fake name and acting like a completely different person to shield himself from his depression, but ends up running into Aiko by chance.
10	April 27, 2012	978-4-09-151537-7	March 21, 2017	978-1-4215-8624-3
Punpun reconnects with Aiko, but lies to her by acting confident and pretending that his life is much better than it actually is. Overwhelmed by his confused feelings, he ends up bringing Aiko to a hotel where he tries to have sex with her, barely stopping when she asks him to. Shocked and angered, she leaves the hotel room, stating that she regrets having met again. Left in shock and despair by this event, Punpun reunites with Sachi, who has become a more successful manga artist on her own, and announces to him that she is pregnant with her ex-husband's baby. Punpun confesses his lies to Aiko; she confesses in return that she herself had lied about her own life, as she is unsuccessful in her career and still lives with her abusive mother. Instead of accompanying Sachi to the abortion clinic like he promised, Punpun, whom Aiko visits, has sex with her, and the two decide to leave the city together to start anew.
11	November 30, 2012	978-4-09-151543-8	June 20, 2017	978-1-4215-8625-0
Punpun and Aiko visit Aiko's mother to announce to her that Aiko is leaving, but she reacts by stabbing Aiko in the side with a knife. Trying to save her, Punpun fights Aiko's mother and ends up strangling her to death, killing her on purpose. The two bury the body in the forest and leave the town to flee from the police, deciding to go to Kagoshima like they had promised each other when they were children. As they travel, they grow more hostile and resentful toward each other and become more depressed. As Aiko's injury worsens, she tries to puncture Punpun's eye with a fork, but only ends up giving him a minor injury. Meanwhile, Sachi becomes worried about Punpun's absence and starts searching for him.
12	June 28, 2013	978-4-09-151549-0	June 20, 2017	978-1-4215-8625-0
Punpun and Aiko's relationship and injuries worsen more and more as they both display suicidal ideation. After Punpun comes close to killing a stranger for no real reason, the duo arrives in Kagoshima and decides to go to the nearby island of Tanegashima. Once there, after an innocent evening spent having fun, Punpun decides to strangle Aiko to death with a rope before killing himself. However, she talks him out of it, while also confessing that she is in fact the one who killed her mother, having stabbed her to death after noticing that she was still alive after her fight with Punpun. Meanwhile, Sachi continues to search for Punpun by meeting with his friends and family.
13	December 27, 2013	978-4-09-151555-1	September 19, 2017	978-1-4215-8626-7
Punpun and Aiko continue their journey, as their depression and relationship are at their worst. Aiko insists on how happy she is that the two fell in love, but when Punpun wakes up from his nap, he discovers that she committed suicide by hanging herself. Refusing to accept the truth, Punpun carries her body with him, but it is eventually found and taken away by locals. He comes back to Tokyo and attempts to kill himself near an old building he, Aiko, and their friends visited back in elementary school, but is found by Sachi, who saves him and brings him to a hospital. Meanwhile, Pegasus and his cultists commit mass suicide, but Seki saves Shimizu from dying in the burning building. Shimizu is left with amnesia as a result of the incident and can't remember who Seki is. A year later, Punpun, whose probation for his role in the death of Aiko's mother just finished, has a regular job, having found relative peace in an ordinary—if unexciting—life. Harumi, an old friend of Punpun from elementary school, meets him by chance on the street, and after a short, unremarkable discussion, the two part ways. As Punpun, surrounded by the friends he made through those last years, tearfully waves goodbye, Harumi waves back, knowing that they will likely never meet again. At the school where Harumi teaches, a girl transfers into his class, and a young student falls in love with her at first sight, just like Punpun did with Aiko eleven years before.

== Reception ==
By January 2019, the manga had 3 million copies in circulation. Goodnight Punpun won the 22nd Spanish Manga Barcelona award for the seinen category in 2016. The series was nominated for the 2017 Eisner Award in the "Best U.S. Edition of International Material—Asia" category, for its first four volumes. The manga received a Jury Recommendation at the 13th Japan Media Arts Festival Awards in 2009.
