= Mujina Into the Deep =

Japanese manga series

- First wideban volume cover
- Manga
- Written by: Inio Asano
- Published by: Shogakukan
- English publisher: NA: Viz Media
- Imprint: Big Comics Superior
- Magazine: Big Comic Superior
- Original run: March 10, 2023 – present
- Volumes: 6
- icon

Mujina Into the Deep (stylized in all caps) is a Japanese manga series written and illustrated by Inio Asano. It has been serialized in Shogakukan's seinen manga magazine Big Comic Superior since March 2023. The story follows loner Terumi Morgan, whose quiet life is upended by a runaway kid and an assassin mujina—individuals excluded from society.

== Publication ==
Written and illustrated by Inio Asano, Mujina Into the Deep started in Shogakukan's seinen manga magazine Big Comic Superior on March 10, 2023. The series ended its "first season" on April 10, 2026, and is set to resume with its "second season" in 2027. Shogakukan has collected its chapters into individual wideban volumes. The first volume was released on September 28, 2023. As of May 29, 2026, six volumes have been released.

In North America, Viz Media is publishing the manga digitally in English. In May 2024, Viz Media announced the publication of the manga in print. The first volume was released on February 18, 2025.

=== Volumes ===
No.	Original release date	Original ISBN	English release date	English ISBN
1	September 28, 2023	978-4-09-862513-0	February 18, 2025	978-1-9747-4999-7
2	March 22, 2024	978-4-09-862758-5	May 20, 2025	978-1-9747-5475-5
3	October 30, 2024	978-4-09-863114-8	December 16, 2025	978-1-9747-5812-8
4	April 30, 2025	978-4-09-863434-7	May 19, 2026	978-1-9747-6300-9
5	November 28, 2025	978-4-09-863677-8	December 15, 2026	978-1-9747-6864-6
6	May 29, 2026	978-4-09-864019-5	—	—

== Reception ==
The manga placed 19th on "The Best Manga 2024 Kono Manga wo Yome!" ranking by Freestyle magazine. The series won the Daruma for Best Manga and Drawing, and was nominated in the Daruma for Best Screenplay, New Manga, and Suspense Manga categories at the Japan Expo Awards in 2026.
