= Inio Asano =

Japanese manga author

Inio Asano 浅野 いにお
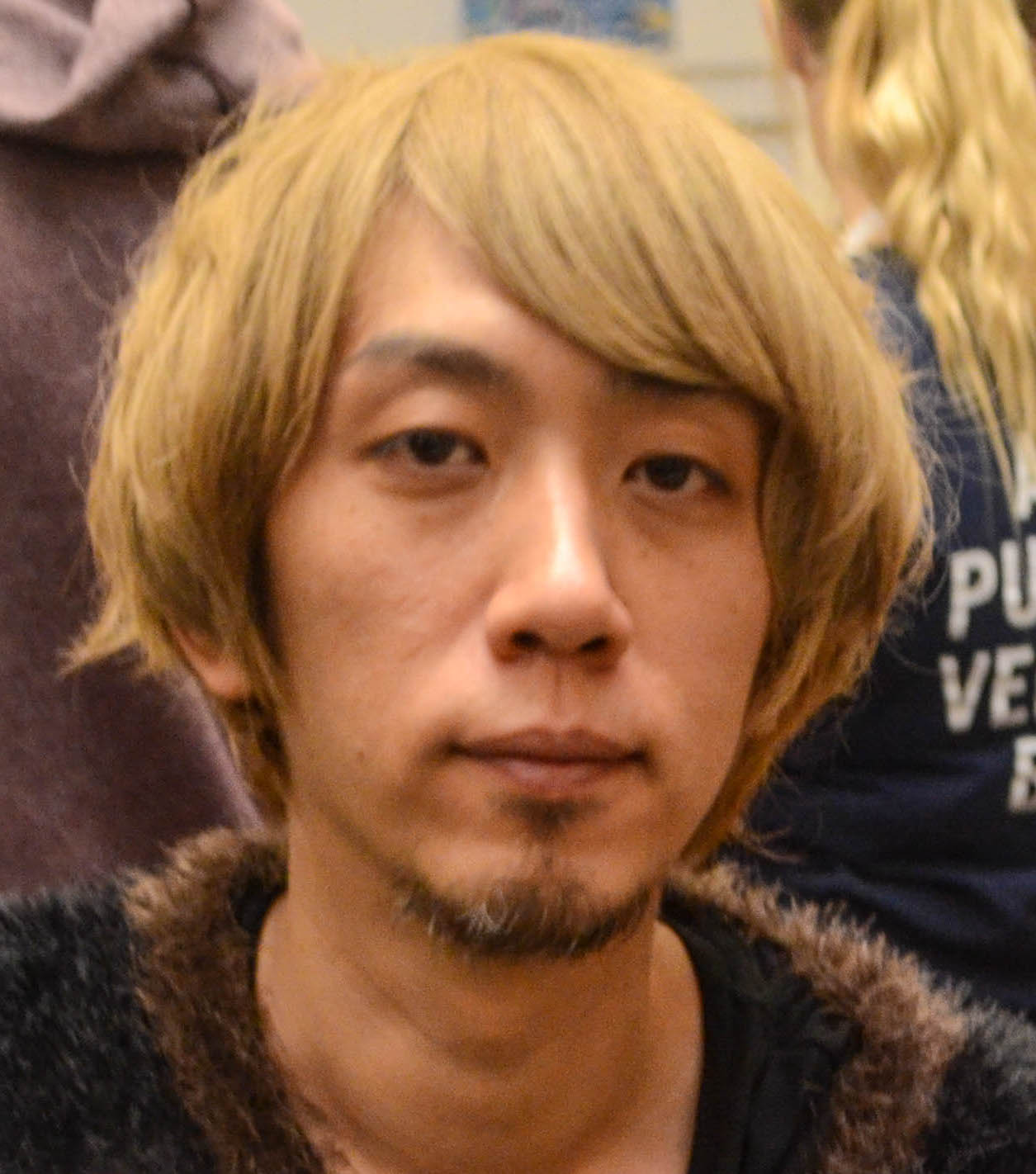
- Inio Asano, at the 2018 Toronto Comic Arts Festival
- Born: Inio Asano; September 22, 1980 (age 46) Ishioka, Japan
- Area: Manga artist
- Notable works: Goodnight Punpun; Solanin; Dead Dead Demon's Dededede Destruction
- Spouse: Akane Torikai (m. 2018–2022)

Inio Asano (Japanese: 浅野 いにお, Hepburn: Asano Inio; born September 22, 1980) is a Japanese manga artist. Asano created the acclaimed manga series Solanin, which was released as a feature film in Japan in April 2010, starring Aoi Miyazaki. He is also famous for the series Goodnight Punpun and Dead Dead Demon's Dededede Destruction.

Known for creating character-driven, realist stories, ranging from slice of life to psychological horror, Asano won first prize in the 2001 GX competition for young manga artists. In 2010, Yomiuri Shimbun described Asano as "one of the voices of his generation."

== Works ==
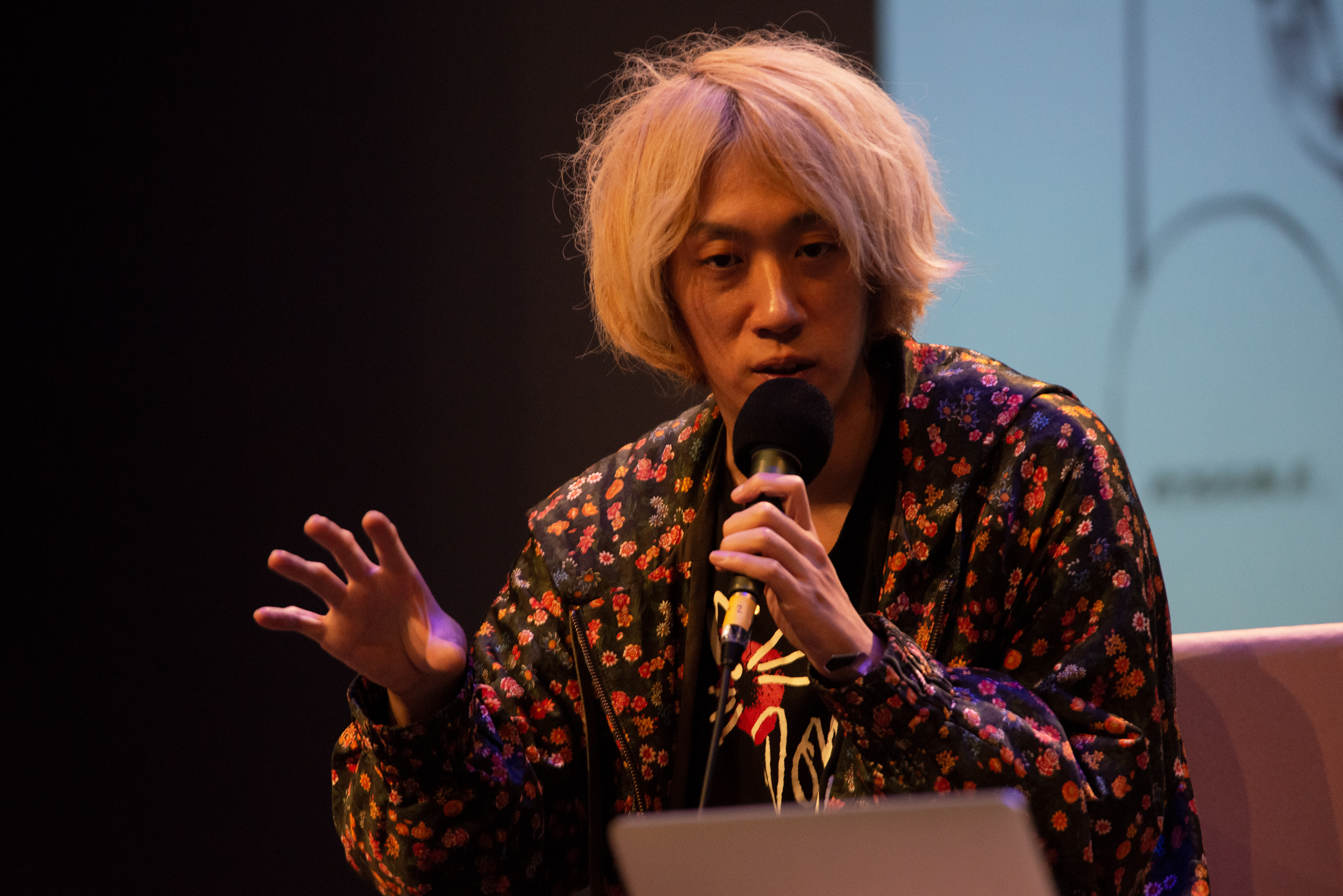
Inio Asano at Angoulême Comics Festival in 2020

- Futsū no Hi (普通の日; "An Ordinary Day") (2000)
- Sotsugyōshiki Jigoku (卒業式地獄; "Graduation Ceremony Hell") (2000)
- Uchū kara Konnichi wa (宇宙からコンニチハ; "Hello from the Universe") (2001)
- What a Wonderful World! (素晴らしい世界, Subarashii Sekai) (2002 – 2004)
  - Licensed in North America by Viz Media.
- Nijigahara Holograph (虹ヶ原ホログラフ, Nijigahara Horogurafu) (2003 – 2005)
  - Licensed in North America by Fantagraphics Books.
- Hikari no Machi (ひかりのまち; "City of Lights") (2004 – 2005)
- Sekai no Owari to Yoake Mae (世界の終わりと夜明け前; "The End of The World and Before Dawn") (2005 – 2008)
- Solanin (ソラニン, Soranin) (2005 – 2006)
  - Licensed in North America by Viz Media. An additional epilogue chapter was included in a new edition published in Japan in October 2017.
- Goodnight Punpun (おやすみプンプン, Oyasumi Punpun) (2007 – 2013)
  - Licensed in North America by Viz Media.
- Ozanari-kun (おざなり君) (2008 – 2011)
- A Girl on the Shore (うみべの女の子, Umibe no Onna no Ko) (2009 – 2013)
  - Licensed in North America by Vertical.
- Ctrl+T Asano Inio Works (Ctrl+T 浅野いにおWORKS, Kontorōru Purasu Tī Asano Inio Wākusu) (2010)
- Planet (2010)
- Toshi no Se (としのせ; "Year-end") (2012)
- Kinoko Takenoko (きのこたけのこ; "Mushroom Bamboo Shoot") (2013)
- Dead Dead Demon's Dededede Destruction (デッドデッドデーモンズデデデデデストラクション, Deddo Deddo Dēmonzu Dededededesutorakushon) (2014 – 2022)
  - Licensed in North America by Viz Media.
  - Won the 66th Shogakukan Manga Award in the general category in 2021.
- Bakemono Recchan/Kinoko Takenoko: Asano Inio Tanpenshuu (浅野いにお短編集 ばけものれっちゃん / きのこたけのこ) (February 6, 2015)
- Yūsha Tachi (勇者たち; "Heroes") (2015 – 2018)
- Funwari Otoko (ふんわり男; "A Gentle Man") (2016)
- Sayonara Bye-Bye (さよならばいばい, Sayonara Bai Bai) (2016)
- Downfall (零落, Reiraku) (2017)
  - Licensed in North America by Viz Media.
- Service Area (サービスエリア, Sābisueria) (2018)
- Tempest (TEMPEST, Tenpesuto) (2018)
- Moshi mo Tōkyō (もしも東京; "What if Tokyo...") (2020)
- Mujina Into the Deep (2023)
  - Licensed in North America by Viz Media.
