= Kana (publisher) =

French publishing company

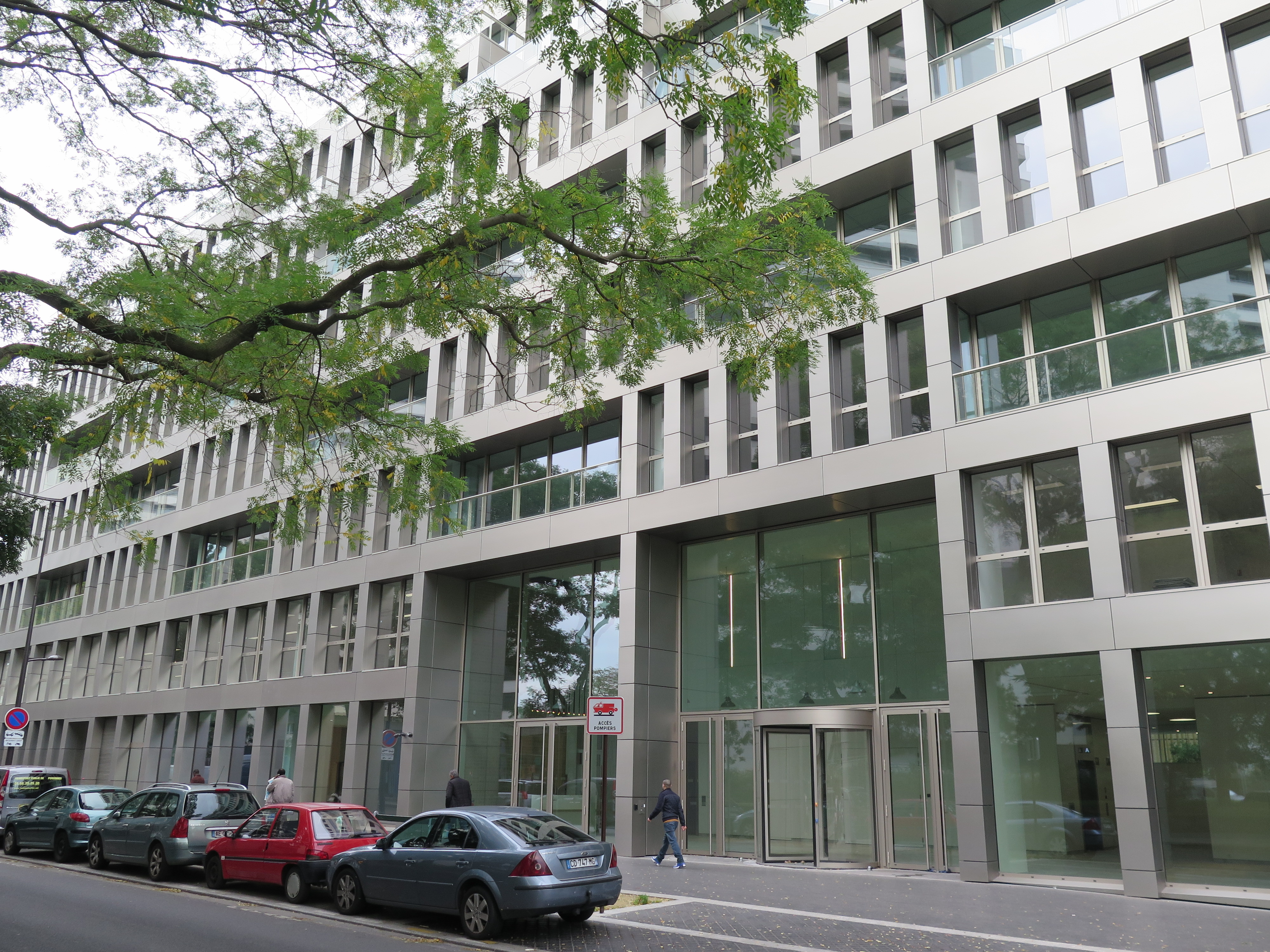
Head office of Kana on 57 rue Gaston Tessier

Kana is a French publisher affiliated with Les Éditions Dargaud. Kana was founded in 1996 by Yves Schlirf. The company publishes manga in French and used to publish in Dutch. Its headquarters are in the Dargaud offices in the 18th arrondissement of Paris.

== Titles ==
- A Chinese Life (Une vie chinoise)
- Absolute Boyfriend
- Angel Nest
- Bakuman
- Black Butler
- Baiyaku Kakebachō Kazuryū
- Case Closed
- Dead Dead Demon's Dededede Destruction
- Doraemon
- GE – Good Ending
- Goodnight Punpun
- Harlock Saga
- Honey and Clover
- Hunter × Hunter
- I Am a Hero
- In Clothes Called Fat
- Me and the Devil Blues
- Monster
- Mushishi
- No. 5
- Piece – Kanojo no Kioku
- Pluto
- Psychometrer Eiji
- The Rose of Versailles
- Saint Seiya: Time Odyssey
- Saturn Apartments
- Sgt. Frog
- Shaman King
- Si loin et si proche
- Snow White with the Red Hair
- Solanin
- The Summit of the Gods
- Tegami Bachi
- What a Wonderful World!
- Undercurrent
- Zipang
- Zatch Bell!
- The Elusive Samurai
- The Blue Wolves of Mibu
