= Jean-Paul Krassinsky =

German-born French cartoonist and illustrator (1972–2026)

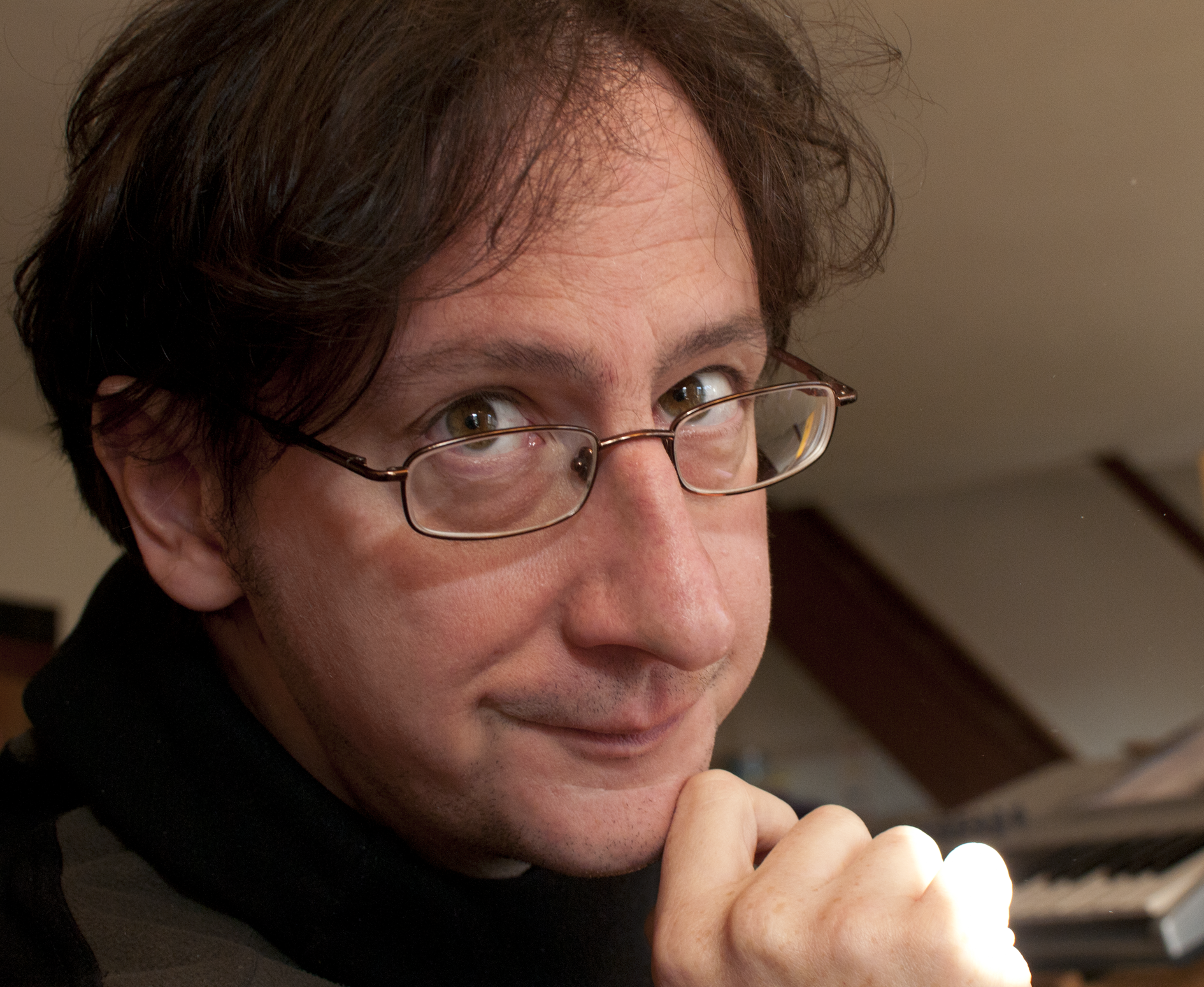
- Krassinsky in 2012
- Born: 25 November 1972; Tegernsee, Bavaria, West Germany
- Died: 31 March 2026 (aged 53)
- Occupations: Cartoonist, illustrator

Jean-Paul Krassinsky (25 November 1972 – 31 March 2026) was a German-born French cartoonist and illustrator. He was best known for his comic strips in the monthly French-language role-playing magazine Casus Belli.

Krassinsky died on 31 March 2026, at the age of 53.
