= Luc Giard =

Canadian underground cartoonist and artist (1956–2026)

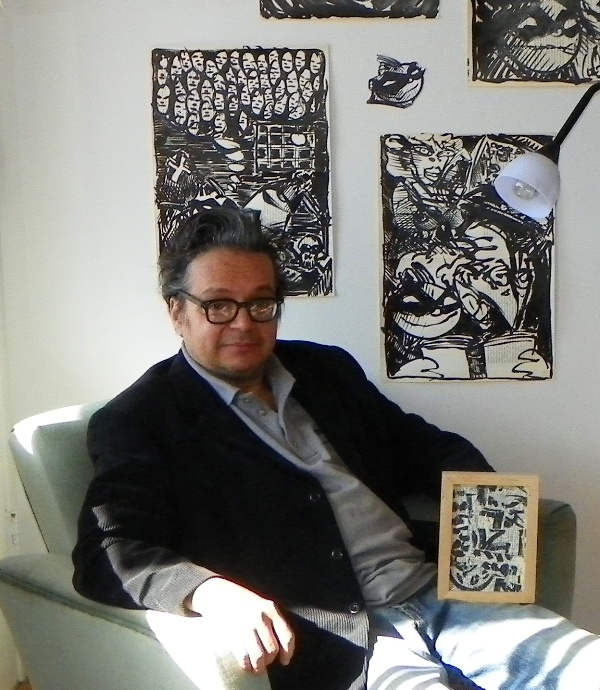
- Born: 1956 Saint-Hyacinthe, Quebec, Canada
- Died: March 10, 2026 (aged 69)
- Areas: Cartoonist, Artist

Luc Giard (1956 – March 10, 2026) was a Canadian underground cartoonist and artist. He was mostly known for his bold, intense drawings of fat Tintin reproductions, nudes, cars and portraits. Giard died on March 10, 2026, at the age of 69.

== Bibliography ==
- Konoshiko, (Impressions Nouvelles, 2012)
- Le pont du Havre, (Mécanique générale, 2005)
- A Village Under My Pillow, (Drawn & Quarterly, 2005)
- Les nouvelles aventures de Ticoune ze Whiz Tornado: Donut Death, (Mécanique générale, 2005)
- Ticoune ze Whiz Tornado 07, (Colosse, 2003)
- Ticoune ze Whiz Tornado 06, (Colosse, 2003)
- Les aventures de monsieur Luc Giard, (Mécanique générale, 2002)
- La guerre, (Colosse, 2002)
- Un pull crado pour une crapule, (Ticoune, 1999)
- Les p'tits Tintins à Luc Giard, (Jour de fête, 1997)
- Portraits, (Zone Convective, 1996)
- Vers le pays des morts (with Grégoire Bouchard), (Phylactère, 1991)
- Ticoune ze whiz tornado no 1 à 5, (Phylactère, 1989–1990)
- Tintin et son ti-gars, (Phylactère, 1989)
- Cartoons, (Phylactère, 1988)
- Kesskiss passe Milou?, (Phylactère, 1988)
- Ze British barbu, (Ticoune, 1988)
- Tintin chez Krazy Kat, (Ticoune, 1988)
- Tintin et sa Dinky toys, (Ticoune, 1987)
- La Torpado noire, (Ticoune, 1987)
- Batman portfolio, (Ticoune, 1987)
- Les malheurs de Milou, (Ticoune, 1987)
- Tintin et le squelette mort, (Ticoune, 1987)
