= Louisa Lesage =

French cartoonist and animator (1998–2026)

- Born: 20 September 1998; Paris, France
- Died: 8 November 2026 (aged 28); Angoulême, France
- Education: École Estienne; Gobelins Paris
- Occupations: Cartoonist; Animator

Louisa Lesage (French: [lwizˈa ləzˈaʒ]; 20 September 1998 – 8 November 2026) was a French cartoonist and animator.

== Life and career ==
Born in Paris on 20 September 1998, Lesage attended the École Estienne and Gobelins Paris. In 2019, she released Moi vivant (I, Alive), a short animated film selected by the Forum des images for "Cour(t)s d'écoles" in December 2019. In 2020, it was shown at the London International Animation Festival. Alongside her film work, she created biographical comics on Instagram, prior to their print publication. Her first comic book was published by Exemplaire on 4 May 2026, titled Journal d'un alien en roue libre. The book was part of a crowdfunding initiative which raised 10,000 euros; sales from the publication totaled 25,573 euros, resulting in a profit for Lesage and her publisher. In the fall of 2026, she announced that a sequel titled Journal d'un alien en chute libre was in the works, with publication anticipated for spring 2027.

Her comics depicted mental health struggles often faced by individuals with Autism.

Lesage died from a fall after a night out in Angoulême, on 8 November 2026, at the age of 28.
