= Mitch Byrd =

American comic artist (1962–2026)

Mitch Byrd

Mitch Dewayne Byrd (July 28, 1962 – July 21, 2026) was an American comic book artist, who worked primarily as a penciller.

Byrd's first major work in comics was the book Cat and Mouse, working with Steven Butler and Roland Mann. The book was published first by Aircel Comics and later Malibu Comics after the two companies merged. Throughout the 1990s, Byrd worked occasionally for both Marvel Comics and DC Comics.

A book of his art entitled The Art of Mitch Byrd volume1, was published in 2001. Scribbles & Sketches HC Vol. 01 was published in January 2008.

Byrd died from a heart attack on July 21, 2026, at the age of 63.
