= Jean-Benoît Meybeck =

French comic book author and illustrator (1973–2026)

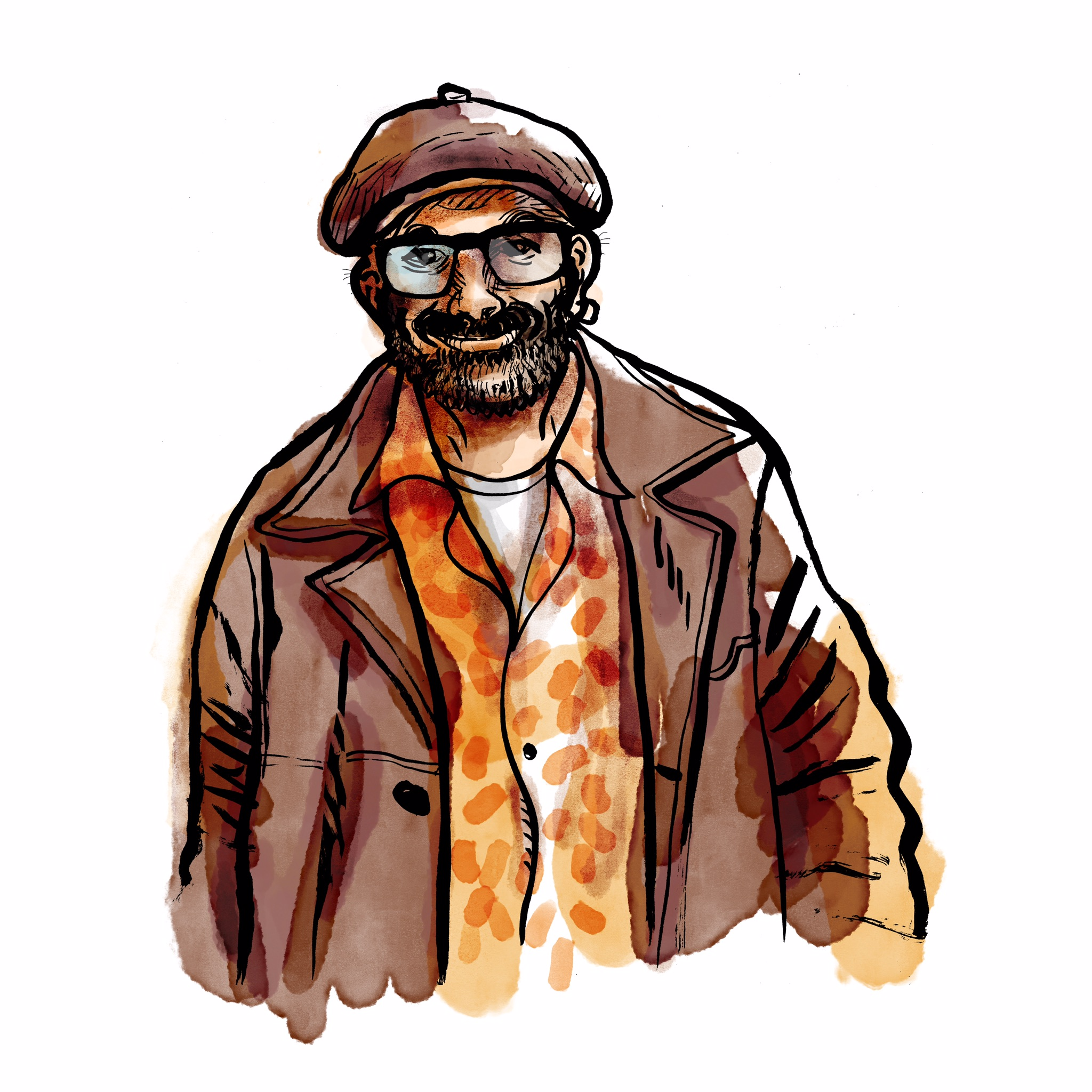
- Meybeck self-potrait (2020)
- Born: 29 January 1973; Grenoble, France
- Died: April 2026 (aged 53)
- Occupations: Comic book author, illustrator

Jean-Benoît Meybeck (French: [ʒˈɑ̃-bənwˈa mɛbˈɛk]; 29 January 1973 – April 2026) was a French comic book author and illustrator.

A native of Grenoble, he worked as a graphic designer before starting a comics blog in 2010. He began making appearances at the Angoulême International Comics Festival and wrote comics on topics such as immigration, jihadism, and biodynamic agriculture. From 2023 to 2026, he collaborated with Pascal Marchand in a five-part series on the history of science.

Meybeck died in April 2026, at the age of 53.

== Publications ==
- CRA : Centre de rétention administrative (2014)
- Koko au pays des toutous (2016)
- Citra et Chamira : Quand j'étais jihadiste (2021)
- CosmoBacchus
  - Lucifer (2018)
  - Ahriman (2019)
  - Soradt (2020)
- Cosmobacchus : Intégrale (2022)
- pistémè tome 1 : Eurêka : Une histoire des idées scientifiques durant l'antiquité (2023)
