= Eddie Germano =

American cartoonist (1924–2026)

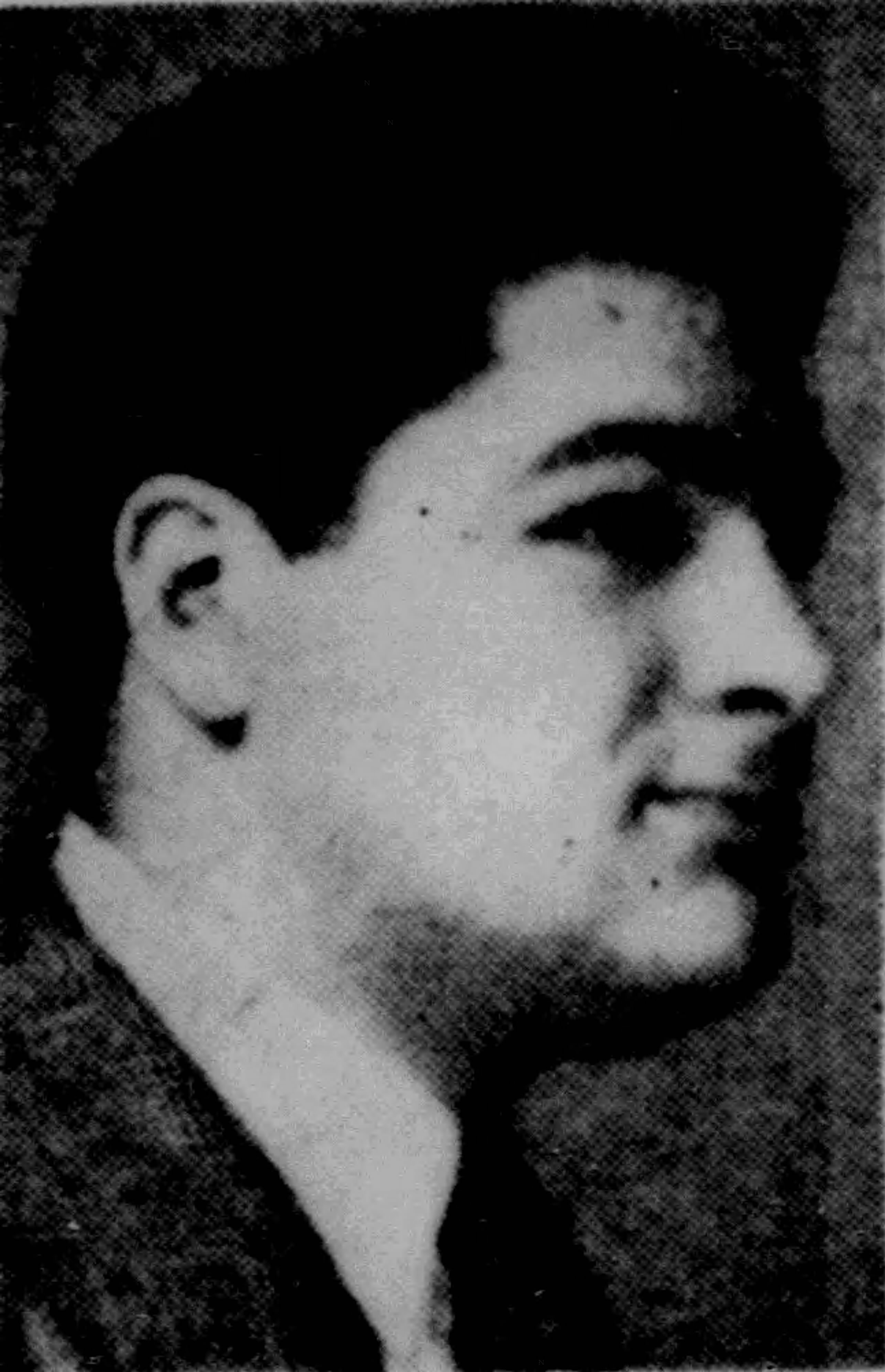
Germano in 1949

Edward Germano (November 15, 1924 – February 27, 2026) was an American cartoonist who was best known for his sports cartoons.

== Background ==
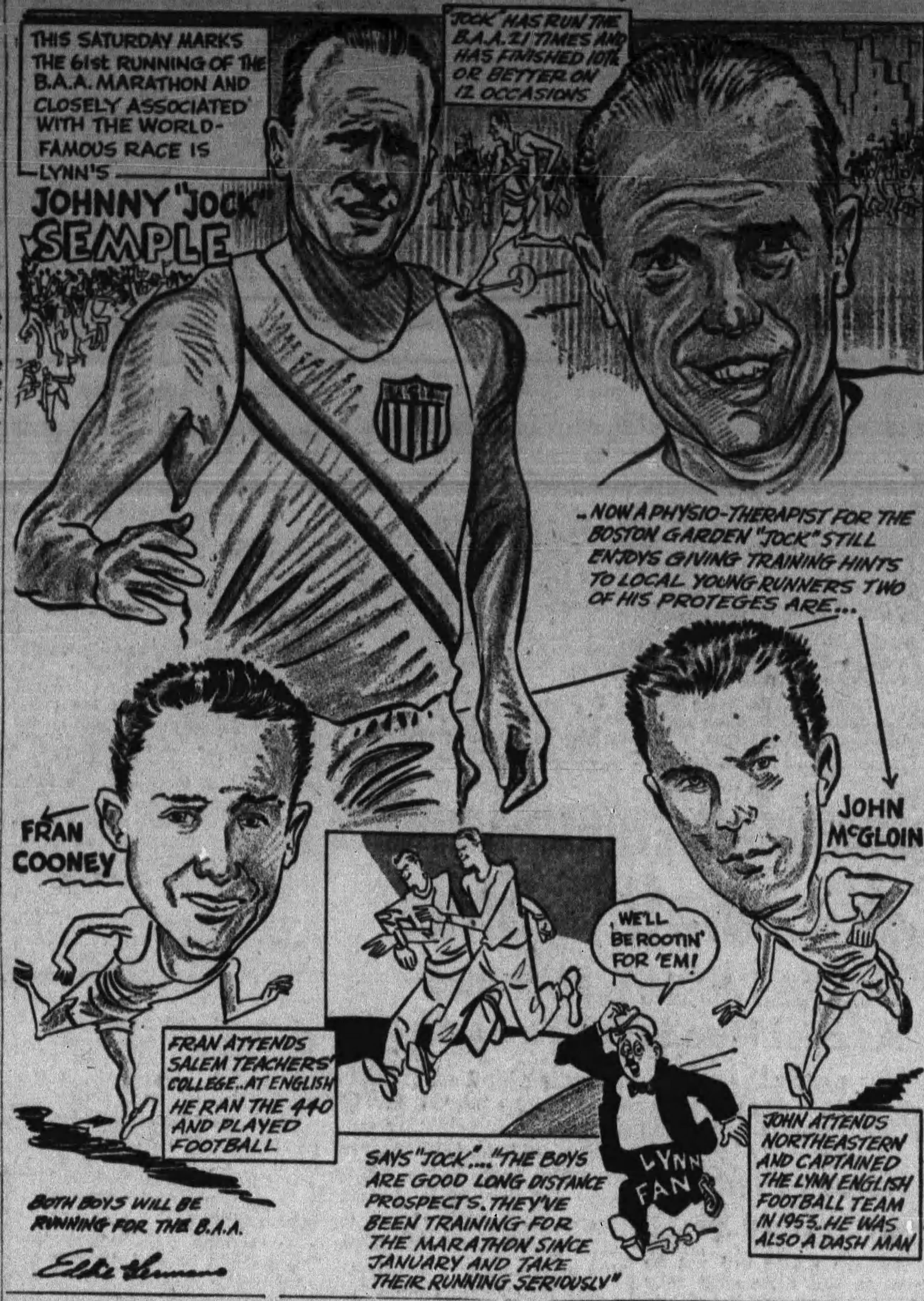
Germano's caricatures of 1957 Boston Marathon runners from Lynn, Massachusetts

Edward Germano was born in Boston, Massachusetts, on November 15, 1924. He started working at an office of The Boston Post at age 16. After serving in the Army, he got his first full-time position as a cartoonist in 1948. He then worked at several Massachusetts and Florida newspapers. In 1963, he joined the staff of the Brockton Enterprise in order to create sports and editorial cartoons for the publication. At age 66, Germano left the Enterprise to pursue freelance work. Germano continues to draw privately commissioned cartoons. He has 3 children as well as six granddaughters: Jaclyn Germano, Jennifer Germano, Julia Germano, Justina Germano, Anna Germano, and Maria Ducey and 3 grandsons: Edward Germano, Michael Germano, and Harry Germano.

Germano turned 100 in November 2024, and died on February 27, 2026, at the age of 101.

== Career ==
Besides working at newspapers, Germano also worked on numerous cartoon projects. He acted as producer on a cartoon television show for three years. In 1971, Germano began contributing special cartoon sports features for The Boston Globe.

During the 1990s, Germano worked with Tom McCormick on Mr. Speaker, a strip that is unpublished. Some of his cartoons have also been displayed at the Baseball Hall of Fame in Cooperstown, New York.

== Books ==
Germano's cartoons often feature Boston's sports teams. In 1989, his book Red Sox Drawing Board was published.

== Awards ==
Germano won the National Cartoonist Society Sports Cartoon Award in 1981 and 1992. Germano also won an award for his cartoon series on heavyweight boxer Rocky Marciano, who grew up in Brockton, MA.
