= Brice Tarvel =

French author (1946–2026)

- Tarvel in 2014
- Born: Jean Pol Laselle; 5 August 1946; Reims, France
- Died: 7 October 2026 (aged 80)
- Occupation: Author

Jean Pol Laselle (French: [ʒˈɑ̃ pˈɔl lazˈɛl]; 5 August 1946 – 7 October 2026), better known by the pen name Brice Tarvel (French: [bʁˈis taʁvˈɛl]), was a French author.

A native of Reims, he spent much of his career publishing with Éditions Fleurus. He received the Angoulême International Comics Festival Prix Jeunesse 7–8 ans for Boogy et Rana at the Angoulême International Comics Festival.

Tarvel died on 7 October 2026, at the age of 80.

== Publications ==
=== Comics ===
==== Arkan ====
- L'Écume du diable (1990)
- L'Étang qui rétrécissait (1996)
- Les Souris vertes (1998)
- Le Secret des Ouaouarons (2000)
- La Fièvre du samedi soir (2002)

==== Les Contes de Mortepierre ====
- Le Ventre des Ténèbres (1996)
- La forêt de nulle part (1998)
- La Louve blessée (2001)
- Florie (2004)
- La Nuit des chauves-souris (2006)

==== Mortepierre ====
- La Chair et le soufre (1995)
- Les Guerriers de rouille (1998)
- La Mangeuse de Lune (1999)
- Le Sceau de l'ogre (2002)
- Le Carnaval funèbre (2005)

==== Sylve ====
- Le Peuple des racines (1990)
- Le Voyage vertical (1993)
- Le Seigneur des écorces (1998)

==== Les Traîne-ténèbres ====
- Le Paladin, le gueux et la sorcière (1999)
- Les Dents du dragon (2000)
- Le Pays des montagnes sans nom (2001)
- La Forêt hurlante (2002)

==== Harry Dickson ====
- La Maison borgne (2014)

=== Novels ===
- Dépression (1990)
- La Chair sous les ongles (1990)
- Silence rouge (1993)
- Les Aventures d'Arnaud Stolognan
  - La Vallée truquée (1995)
  - Les Chasseurs de chimères (1995)
  - Destination cauchemar (2007)
- Le Bal des Iguanes (2008)
- Les Dossiers secrets de Harry Dickson
  - La Main maléfique - L'Héritage de Cagliostro (2009)
  - La Confrérie des hommes griffus - La Maison du pluvier (2010)
  - Le Gouffre des ombres - Le Jardin des mandragores (2012)
  - Le Polichinelle d’argile - La Chambre effroyable (2014)
- Nuz Sombrelieu
  - Les Prisonnières du silence (2010)
  - La Nuit sinueuse (2012)
- Pluie de plomb sur Pluton (2015)
- Ceux des eaux mortes
  - L’Or et la toise (2011)
  - Au Large des vivants (2011)
- Charogne tango (2014)
- Une camionnette qui servait de volière (2016)
- Bob Morane (2014)
  - La Forteresse des nuages (2014)
  - Le Murmure des ombres (2014)
  - Brutux (2018)
  - Opération Chronos (2015)
  - Le Syndrome du pharaon (2018)
  - L'Idole viking (2016)
- Morgane
  - Le Démon du grenier (2015)
  - Ceux du soupirail (2015)
  - Le Château des somnambules (2016)
- Pierre-fendre (2017)
- La Montre de Rimbaud (2018)
- Astar Mara : les chemins d'eau (2019)
- La Murène (2019)
- La Maison à claire-voie (2021)
- Les Évadés du silence (2021)
- Portrait de la mort donnant le sein (2023)
- Les Moissonneurs de nuages (2024)
