= Jean-Louis Lechat =

Belgian journalist (1943–2026)

- Born: 25 January 1943; Chimay, German-occupied Belgium and Northern France
- Died: 9 July 2026 (aged 83)
- Education: Catholic University of Louvain (Lic.)
- Occupation: Journalist

Jean-Louis Lechat (25 January 1943 – 9 July 2026) was a Belgian journalist and writer who specialized in the coverage of comics.

== Life and career ==
Born in Chimay on 25 January 1943, Lechat obtained a licentiate in Romance philology from the Catholic University of Louvain. In 1972, he was a founding journalist of Le Journal de Bruxelles alongside Jean-Luc Vernal and Claude Renard. In 1981, he joined the magazine Tintin and its subsidiary, Hello Bédé, in 1989. To celebrate the 50th anniversary of the publishing house Le Lombard, he wrote Le Lombard, un demi-siècle d'aventures. The first volume covered the years 1946 to 1969 while the second covered 1970 to 1996. The two installments were reissued together in 2006 under the title Le Lombard, l’aventure sans fin. In 1996, he received the award for comic book journalism from the Chambre belge des experts en bande dessinée.

From 1998 to 2008, Lechat collaborated on the project La Lettre de Dargaud, a series of books about comic books and their creators. He also contributed to the book Le Livre d'or de la bande dessinée (1925-1955), which was translated into Dutch as well. In 2006, he produced a 16-page supplementary section to the re-edition of Derib, un créateur et son univers. He contributed to the 2007 collective Les Expéditions d'Alix, which was part of the larger collection "Philabédé". In 2010, he wrote the text for the comic book La Tibetière - 177 caricatures.

Lechat died on 9 July 2026, at the age of 83.

== Works ==
=== Un demi siècle d'aventures ===
- Tome 1 : 1946-1969 (1996)
- Tome 2 : 1970-1996 (1996)

=== Le Lombard, l'aventure sans fin ===
- Tome 1 : 1946-1969 (2006)
- Tome 2 : 1970-1996 (2006)

=== Collections ===
- Le Livre d'or de la bande dessinée (1986)
- Derib, un créateur et son univers (2006)
- Les Expéditions d'Alix (2007)

=== Adaptations ===
- Willy Vandersteen, le Breughel de la Bande Dessinée (1994)

=== Books ===
- Mathilde et Philippe : les Belges réconciliés (1999)
- Uccle : souvenirs du XXe siècle (2001)
