= Eriamel =

French comic book writer (1952–2026)

- Born: Thierry Lemaire; 11 July 1952
- Died: 25 June 2026 (aged 73)
- Occupation: Comic book writer

Thierry Lemaire (French: [tjɛʁˈi ləmˈɛʁ]; 11 July 1952 – 25 June 2026), better known by his pen name Eriamel (French: [eʁjamˈɛl]), was a French comic book writer.

In 1992, he created the fictional character Svein for the comic series Viking, who was a sidekick of Hastein. In 1997, he created the historical fiction series Normannia alongside his friend, Darvil. His 2015 series Le Cœur de Lion – Fréteval depicted Richard I of England in battle against Philip II of France. He had two other books portraying the Gallic Wars: Gergovie and Alésia, l'alliance brisée.

Eriamel died on 25 June 2026, at the age of 73.

== Biography ==
Eriamel created the fictional character “Svein,” for a comic book series about the Vikings in 1992, a companion to the Viking Hastein. Svein's first adventures, illustrated by Darvil, were published in 1992 under the title L’Initiation; then, starting in 1999, they were illustrated by Jean-Marie Woehrel, with whom Eriamel collaborated on four additional volumes through 2009.

In 2010, Eriamel and Jean-Marie Woehrel launched a new three-volume series, Les Fils de Guillaume, which also recounts the events of the First Crusade and concludes with the Battle of Tinchebray.

Together with Darvil, he began the series L’Epte, des Vikings aux Plantagenets in 1997, which provides a highly detailed account of the conflicts between the King of France and the Duke of Normandy, King of England. This series, which concluded in 2015 and is also known as Normannia, consists of five volumes.

To date, 16 albums have been published across three main series: Svein for the Vikings, Normannia-l’Epte for ducal Normandy, and Les Fils de Guillaume.

In 2006, he co-authored Italia Normannorum with another partner, Serge Mogère, based on an illustration by Bad, which tells the story of the Norman knights who set out to try their luck in Southern Italy.

He has also contributed to the albums in Serge Mogère's Bichancourt series and created a few other albums, such as Le Cœur de Lion – Fréteval (2015) with Jean-Blaise Djian, Juliette Derenne, and Bruno Marivain—a story recounting a virtually unknown battle between Richard the Lionheart and Philip Augustus, with Pierre Liger serving as an advisor.

Earlier, in 2000, in collaboration with Jean-Christophe Vergne, he chronicled the youth of Richard I of England, Duke of Aquitaine and Count of Poitou, in Le Cœur de Lion.

While his primary area of expertise is the Norman Middle Ages of the 11th and 12th centuries, he has also authored two books on the Gallic Wars: Gergovie (2017) and Alésia, the Broken Alliance (2020).

Eriamel died on June 25, 2026, at the age of 73.

== Publications ==
- Le Cœur de Lion
  - Fils d'Aliénor (2001)
  - Fréteval (2015)
- L'Epte, des Vikings aux Plantagenets
  - Le Sang de Rollon pour St Clair coulera (1997)
- Normannia
  - Le Face à face des Rois (2003)
  - Deux Guillaume pour un Duché (2007)
  - L'Ultime Rébellion (2010)
  - Mort en Flandre (2015)
- Les Fils de Guillaume
  - L'Héritage (2010)
  - Le Retour du Croisé (2015)
  - La Guerre fratricide (2017)
- Italia Normannorum
  - Les Précurseurs (2006)
- Moi Svein, compagnon d'Hasting
  - L'Initiation (1992)
  - Méditerranée (1999)
  - Pépin II d'Aquitaine (1999)
  - Robert le Fort (2004)
  - L'Aigle de sang (2009)
- Roma
  - Gergovie (2017)
  - Alésia (2020)
- Tourmente sur Brutusvilliers ci-devant Montivilliers (1989)
