= Yves Schlirf =

Belgian comic book editor (died 2026)

Yves Schlirf (died 12 September 2026) was a Belgian comic book and manga editor. Originally a bookseller in Brussels, he became editorial director of Dargaud Benelux and later headed Dargaud's Belgian operations and the Blake and Mortimer publishing imprint. He was also involved in the publication of the Franco-Belgian series XIII.

In 1996, Schlirf founded Kana, Dargaud's manga imprint, after several trips to Japan. Under Kana, French-language editions of series including Naruto, Saint Seiya, Detective Conan, Slam Dunk, Hunter × Hunter and Yu-Gi-Oh! were published.

Schlirf died on 12 September 2026.
