= Saint Seiya: Time Odyssey =

French comics series

- First volume cover

Publication information
- Publisher: Kana; Ablaze Publishing (English)
- Publication date: 2022–present
- No. of issues: 4

Creative team
- Written by: Jérôme Alquié; Arnaud Dollen
- Artist: Jérôme Alquié

Saint Seiya: Time Odyssey is a French comics series by Jérôme Alquié and Arnaud Dollen based on Masami Kurumada's manga series Saint Seiya.

== Plot ==
Chronos, the god of time, wants to become the thirteenth god of Olympus, just like Hades, Poseidon or Athena. To do this, he needs to build the "Doomsday Clock" that will change the past, present and the future.

== Characters ==
=== Athena's Army ===
- Saori Kido (Athena)

Bronze Saints

- Pegasus Seiya (天馬星座の星矢, Pegasasu no Seiya)
- Cygnus Hyoga (白鳥星座の氷河, Kigunasu no Hyōga)
- Dragon Shiryu (龍星座の紫龍, Doragon no Shiryū)
- Andromeda Shun (アンドロメダ星座の瞬, Andoromeda no Shun)
- Phoenix Ikki (鳳凰星座の一輝, Fenikkusu no Ikki)

Silver Saints

- Fornax Jorge (ろ座のジョルジェ, Roja no Joruje) known as 'Guilty'
- Sculptor Lodi'N (彫刻のロディン, Kizamu no Rōdin)

=== Chronos's Army ===
- Chronos

Twelve Hours

- Clotho (I)
- Lachesis (V)
- Atropos (XI)
- Arctos (XII)

Leptas

- Drachme (XII-V)

== Publication ==
Kana began officially releasing the series in French on September 30, 2022. Each volume was also released in a collector's edition. The series is planned to end in 6 volumes in 2027.

Volume 1 was first published in 2 parts in the September and November 2022 issues of Akita Shoten's Champion Red from July 19, 2022 to September 16. Volume 2 was published in 2 parts in the December 2023 and January 2024 issues of the same magazine from October 19, 2023 to November 17 after the French version was published on September 22.

In October 2023, Ablaze Publishing announced that they licensed the comic in English.
