= Solanin =

Japanese manga series

- First tankōbon volume cover

ソラニン (Soranin)
- Genre: Coming-of-age; Romance; Slice of life
- Manga
- Written by: Inio Asano
- Published by: Shogakukan
- English publisher: NA: Viz Media
- Magazine: Weekly Young Sunday
- Original run: 2005 – 2006
- Volumes: 2
- Live-action film
- Directed by: Takahiro Miki
- Written by: Takahashi Izumi
- Music by: Asian Kung-Fu Generation and ent (Atsushi Horie)
- Released: April 3, 2010
- Runtime: 126 minutes
- icon

Solanin (Japanese: ソラニン, Hepburn: Soranin) is a Japanese manga series written and illustrated by Inio Asano. It was serialized in Shogakukan's Weekly Young Sunday from 2005 to 2006. In North America, the manga was licensed for English language release by Viz Media.

The manga was adapted into a live-action film directed by Takahiro Miki and starring Aoi Miyazaki as Meiko. It was released in Japan in April 2010. In the same year the band Asian Kung-Fu Generation released the single "Solanin", with lyrics written by Inio Asano, author of the manga. The song was featured in the movie version. The band also provided the ending theme to the movie.

In October 2017, eleven years after the manga's original publication, a new epilogue chapter was published by Shogakukan as part of a new Japanese edition.

== Plot ==
Meiko and Taneda graduated from university two years ago. Having no real goals or direction, they step into society, clueless. Meiko works as an Office Lady to pay the rent for her apartment, while Taneda works as an illustrator in a press company, earning just enough to take some of Meiko's burden. While Taneda often meets up with his bandmates from their University days to jam, he still feels something is missing. His bandmates know what it is: they need to step out, promote themselves and let their songs be heard by a larger crowd; which has been their dream since their first meeting in their university's "Pop Music Club".

Unhappy with the rhythm of their "normal" graduate lives, things change when two important decisions are made: Meiko decides to quit her job, and Taneda decides to devote time to write his first proper song for the band. Having broken free of their old routines, they now find themselves uncertain of where their new life will take them. Slowly, Meiko and Taneda come to embrace their unpredictable future together but an unexpected tragedy occurs, changing their lives and the lives of their friends forever.

== Media ==
=== Manga ===
Solanin is written and illustrated by Inio Asano. It was serialized in Shogakukan's Weekly Young Sunday from 2005 to 2006. Shogakukan published the manga's two tankōbon on December 5, 2005, and May 2, 2006, respectively. A combined edition featuring colored illustrations and a new epilogue chapter was later released by Shogakukan on October 30, 2017. The manga is licensed in North America by Viz Media, which released the manga as a single volume on October 21, 2008.

=== Live-action film ===
The manga was made into a live-action film directed by Takahiro Miki and starring Aoi Miyazaki as the female protagonist. It was released in Japan on April 3, 2010. In the same year the band Asian Kung-Fu Generation released the single "Solanin", with lyrics written by Inio Asano, author of the manga. The song was featured in the movie version. The band also provided the ending theme to the movie.

== Reception ==
Solanin was nominated for the 2009 Eisner Award for Best U.S. Edition of International Material – Japan. It was nominated for the 2009 Harvey Award for Best American Edition of Foreign Material. About.com's Deb Aoki lists Solanin as the best new one-shot manga of 2008 along with Disappearance Diary.

Pop Culture Shock's Katherine Dacey criticises the manga's backgrounds, saying they look "like dioramas or collages". Deb Aoki from About.com commends the manga for capturing "the angst and uncertainty of a young adult's life with humor and heart." Mania.com's Greg Hackmann commends the author for his attention to detail, "especially when it comes to the manga's many cramped urban settings". Public Library of Charlotte and Mecklenburg County's Lawerence T. comments on the manga "accepting what life has to offer".
