= Shōraiteki ni Shinde kure =

Japanese manga series

- First tankōbon volume cover

将来的に死んでくれ
- Genre: Romantic comedy, yuri
- Manga
- Written by: Chihiro Nagato
- Published by: Kodansha
- Imprint: Shōnen Magazine Comics
- Magazine: Bessatsu Shōnen Magazine
- Original run: October 8, 2016 – October 8, 2019
- Volumes: 7

Shōraiteki ni Shinde kure (将来的に死んでくれ) is a Japanese manga series written and illustrated by Chihiro Nagato. It was serialized in Kodansha's shōnen manga magazine Bessatsu Shōnen Magazine from October 2016 to October 2019.

== Characters ==
Shun Hishikawa (菱川俊, Hishikawa Shun)
Voiced by: Azumi Waki (audio drama)
Komaki Osakabe (刑部小槙, Osakabe Komaki)
Voiced by: Hibiku Yamamura (audio drama)

== Media ==
=== Manga ===
Written and illustrated by Chihiro Nagato, Shōraiteki ni Shinde kure was serialized in Kodansha's shōnen manga magazine Bessatsu Shōnen Magazine from October 8, 2016, to October 8, 2019. The series chapters were collected into seven tankōbon volumes released from April 7, 2017, to November 8, 2019.

| No. | Release date | ISBN |
|---|---|---|
| 1 | April 7, 2017 | 978-4-06-395904-8 |
| 2 | September 8, 2017 | 978-4-06-510195-7 |
| 3 | February 9, 2018 | 978-4-06-510962-5 |
| 4 | July 9, 2018 | 978-4-06-511789-7 |
| 5 | December 7, 2018 | 978-4-06-513482-5 |
| 6 | May 9, 2019 | 978-4-06-515076-4 |
| 7 | November 8, 2019 | 978-4-06-517308-4 |

=== Other ===
An audio drama adaptation was broadcast on RKB and SBS radio stations in July and August 2020, respectively. It featured the performances of Azumi Waki and Hibiku Yamamura as the two leads.

== Reception ==
The series was ranked tenth in the print category at the fourth Next Manga Awards in 2018.
