= How to Eat Life =

Japanese novel series by Ao Jūmonji

- First light novel volume cover

いのちの食べ方 (Inochi no Tabekata)
- Genre: Adventure, fantasy
- Created by: Eve
- Light novel
- Written by: Ao Jūmonji
- Illustrated by: lack
- Published by: Media Factory
- English publisher: NA: Yen Press
- Imprint: MF Bunko J
- Original run: September 22, 2022 – present
- Volumes: 8
- Manga
- Written by: Ao Jūmonji
- Illustrated by: Yutoto
- Published by: Media Factory
- Imprint: MF Comics Gene Series
- Magazine: Monthly Comic Gene
- Original run: October 14, 2023 – present
- Volumes: 4

How to Eat Life (いのちの食べ方, Inochi no Tabekata) is a Japanese light novel series written by Ao Jūmonji and illustrated by lack. It is based on the song of the same name by the singer Eve included in his fifth studio album, Smile. It began publication under Media Factory's MF Bunko J imprint in September 2022. A manga adaptation illustrated by Yutoto began serialization in Media Factory's shōjo manga magazine Monthly Comic Gene in October 2023.

== Plot ==
Tobi Otogiri, a withdrawn second-year middle school student, spends his days searching for his missing older brother. Isolated from his classmates, Tobi's only constant companion is Baku, a mysterious talking backpack he received on the day his brother disappeared. Despite not being human, Baku provides Tobi with companionship and guidance as he navigates his bleak routine.

Tobi's solitary life changes when his classmate Ryuko Shiratama approaches him and reveals that she can also hear Baku. She also reveals she can see strange inhuman entities clinging to people around them, just as Tobi can. As unsettling incidents begin occurring at their school, the two realize these invisible beings may be responsible. Together with Baku, Tobi and Ryūko are drawn into a hidden world where human and inhuman forces intersect.

== Media ==
=== Light novel ===
Written by Ao Jūmonji and illustrated by lack, How to Eat Life began publication under Media Factory's MF Bunko J light novel imprint on September 22, 2022. Eight volumes have been released as of May 25, 2026.

On February 7, 2025, Yen Press announced that they had licensed the novels for English publication beginning in July of that year.

No.	Original release date	Original ISBN	North American release date	North American ISBN
1	September 22, 2022	978-4-04-681751-8	July 8, 2025	979-8-8554-1313-7
0: PST=.BYND "Past Equals Beyond"; 1: Pain Plummets Sideways "Horizontal Falling Down"; 2: The Old Days "Oh Dahlia"; 3: Standing on the Other Side "I'd Be There for You"
2	December 23, 2022	978-4-04-682037-2	March 10, 2026	979-8-8554-1315-1
0: Solutions for Dispersion and Accumulation Unknown: Not a Piece of Cake; 1: Where Are the Limits of Truth and Fiction? Liar Sincere Lie; 2: Like Any Other Mundane Lives; 3: Comets Streaming Through Your Gaze Wish Upon a Comet
3	May 25, 2023	978-4-04-682443-1	October 13, 2026	979-8-8554-1317-5
0: A Moment That Will Never Return Days Gone By; 1: Years Best Kept Unforgotten Surely Tomorrow; 2: A Child Found Dragon Reborn; 3: Facing Forward on a Path Untrodden No Way Out
4	October 25, 2023	978-4-04-682988-7	April 13, 2027	979-8-8554-1319-9
5	June 25, 2024	978-4-04-683541-3	—	—
6	May 23, 2025	978-4-04-684808-6	—	—
7	December 25, 2025	978-4-04-685442-1	—	—
8	May 25, 2026	978-4-04-660160-5	—	—

=== Manga ===
A manga adaptation illustrated by Yutoto began serialization in Media Factory's shōjo manga magazine Monthly Comic Gene on October 14, 2023. The manga's chapters have been compiled into four tankōbon volumes as of September 2026.

No.	Release date	ISBN
1	March 26, 2024	978-4-04-683422-5
2	December 25, 2024	978-4-04-684084-4
3	December 25, 2025	978-4-04-685432-2
4	September 26, 2026	978-4-04-660449-1

== Reception ==
The series won the 2022 Next Light Novel Award in the bunkōbon category.
