= Bessatsu Shōnen Magazine =

Japanese manga magazine

- Cover of the first issue
- Editor-in-Chief: Shintaro Kawakubo
- Former editors: Hiroaki Morita
- Categories: Shōnen manga
- Frequency: Monthly
- Circulation: 8,000; (July–September 2026)
- First issue: September 9, 2009
- Company: Kodansha
- Country: Japan
- Based in: Tokyo
- Language: Japanese
- Website: shonenmagazine.com/bmaga

Bessatsu Shōnen Magazine (Japanese: 別冊少年マガジン, Hepburn: Bessatsu Shōnen Magajin) is a Japanese monthly shōnen manga magazine published by Kodansha. The magazine was started in September 2009 as a spin-off of another Kodansha magazine, Weekly Shōnen Magazine. New issues are published on the 9th of every month.

== Currently running manga series ==
Manga	First Issue	Author
29-sai Dokushin Chūken Bōkensha no Nichijō (29歳独身中堅冒険者の日常)	February 2016	Ippei Nara
The Barbarian's Bride (姫騎士は蛮族の嫁, Himekishi wa Barbaroi no Yome)	January 2021	Noriaki Kotoba
Flying Witch (ふらいんぐうぃっち, Furaingu Wicchi)	September 2012	Chihiro Ishizuka
Gunka no Baltzar (軍靴のバルツァー, Gunka no Barutsua) (moved from Monthly Comic @Bunch)	August 2022	Michitsune Nakajima
The Heroic Legend of Arslan (アルスラーン戦記, Arusurān Senki)	July 2013	Yoshiki Tanaka, Hiromu Arakawa
Hiragi-san's House of Vampires (柊さんちの吸血事情, Hiiragi-san no Kyūketsu Jijō)	November 2021	Miki Yoshikawa
I'm Standing on a Million Lives (100万の命の上に俺は立っている, 100-Man no Inochi no Ue ni Ore wa Tatteiru)	June 2016	Naoki Yamakasa, Akinari Nao
Wistoria: Wand and Sword (杖と剣のウィストリア, Tsue to Tsurugi no Wistoria)	December 2020	Fujino Ōmori, Toshi Aoi
Yaotome × 2 (八乙女×2)	May 2022	Tozen Ujiie

== Past series ==
- ×××Holic by Clamp (2010–2011, moved from Weekly Young Magazine)
- Aho-Girl by Hiroyuki (2015–2017, moved from Weekly Shōnen Magazine)
- Aka no Grimoire by A-10 (2018–2020)
- Animal Land by Makoto Raiku (2009–2014)
- As the Gods Will by Muneyuki Kaneshiro, Akemi Fujimura (2011–2012)
- Attack on Titan by Hajime Isayama (2009–2021)
- Attack on Titan: Junior High by Saki Nakagawa, original by Hajime Isayama (2012–2016)
- Attack on Titan: Lost Girls by Ryōsuke Fuji, original by Hajime Isayama (2015–2016)
- Blissful Land by Ichimon Izumi (2017–2019)
- Blue Lock: Episode Nagi by Kota Sannomiya (2022–2025)
- Boarding School Juliet by Yosuke Kaneda (2015–2017, moved to Weekly Shōnen Magazine)
- Fairy Gone by Ryōsuke Fuji (2019)
- The Flowers of Evil by Shūzō Oshimi (2009–2014)
- From the New World by Tōru Oikawa, Yūsuke Kishi (2012–2014)
- Fungus and Iron by Ayaka Katayama (2021–2026)
- Half & Half by Kōji Seo (2012–2015)
- Happiness by Shūzō Oshimi (2015–2019)
- Ixion Saga by Yūsaku Komiyama (2012–2013)
- Joshiraku by Kōji Kumeta (2009–2013)
- Jūjika no Rokunin by Nakatake Shiryū (2020, moved to Magazine Pocket)
- The Little Lies We All Tell by Madoka Kashihara (2020–2023)
- LovePlus Rinko Days by Kōji Seo (2010–2012)
- Mardock Scramble by Yoshitoki Ōima, Tow Ubukata (2009–2012)
- Mibu Gishiden by Jiro Asada, Takumi Nagayasu (2010–2012) moved to Garaku.mag
- Negiho by Yui (2010–2011)
- O Maidens in Your Savage Season by Mari Okada, Nao Emoto (2016–2019)
- Orient by Shinobu Ohtaka (2021–2024, moved from Weekly Shōnen Magazine)
- Real Account by Okushou, Watanabe Shizumu (2014–2019, moved to Weekly Shōnen Magazine)
- Sankarea: Undying Love by Mitsuru Hattori (2009–2014)
- Seisen Cerberus by Seijirō Narumi (2013)
- Shin Honkaku Mahō Shōjo Risuka by Nao Emoto, Nisio Isin (original) (2021–2024)
- Stunts by Sora Daichi (2022–2023)
- Sweet Poolside by Shūzō Oshimi (2011)
- To the Abandoned Sacred Beasts by Maybe (2014–2023)
- Tomodachi Game by Mikoto Yamaguchi, Yuki Sato (2013–2024)
- Tsuredure Children by Toshiya Wakabayashi (2014–2015, moved to Weekly Shōnen Magazine)
- UQ Holder! by Ken Akamatsu (2016–2022, moved from Weekly Shōnen Magazine)
- Welcome Back, Alice by Shūzō Oshimi (2020–2023)
- The World of Summoning by Yuuki Kodama (2022–2023)
