= Jūjika no Rokunin =

Japanese manga series by Shiryuu Nakatake

- First tankōbon volume cover, featuring Shun Uruma

十字架のろくにん
- Genre: Psychological suspense
- Manga
- Written by: Shiryuu Nakatake
- Published by: Kodansha
- Imprint: Shōnen Magazine Comics
- Magazine: Bessatsu Shōnen Magazine; (March 9 – October 9, 2020); Magazine Pocket; (November 5, 2020 – December 25, 2025)
- Original run: March 9, 2020 – December 25, 2025
- Volumes: 24
- icon

Jūjika no Rokunin (十字架のろくにん; lit. 'Six People of the Cross') is a Japanese manga series written and illustrated by Shiryuu Nakatake. It was originally serialized in Kodansha's shōnen manga magazine Bessatsu Shōnen Magazine from March to October 2020, and was transferred to Magazine Pocket app and website from November 2020 to December 2025, with its chapters collected into twenty-four tankōbon volumes as of March 2026.

By January 2025, the manga had over 4.5 million copies in circulation.

== Plot ==
Jūjika no Rokunin depicts the vengeance of Shun on his bullies. Shun Uruma, a sixth-grade student, is subjected to severe bullying by five of his classmates: Katsumi Senkouji, Yuuga Ushiro, Hiro Madoka, Daichi Kuga, and their leader, Kyou Shigoku. Kyou regards Shun as an experiment, calling him "Experimental Subject A", attempting to determine how much abuse will drive a person to suicide. His only peace was with his brother, Kakeru, who loved him, and his parents, who when they soon found out what was happening to their son, moved Shun to another school; Kyou, unwilling to let the experiment end, arranges an attack that kills Shun's mother and father and puts Kakeru in a vegetative state. Shun moves in with his grandfather, Noboru, who served during World War II in the Kitayama Unit, a clandestine military organization specializing in assassinations and other covert operations. Realizing that Shun intends to kill the bullies who did this to him, Noboru agrees to train him in combat, survival, interrogation, and killing, but on one condition: Shun must spare any of them if they actually repent for what they've done.

=== Pre time-skip ===
Four years later, Shun sets out on his revenge, starting with Senkouji, whom he kills and tortures after Senkouji initially seems to have changed for the better. Shun then saves a girl, Chizuru Azuma, from an attacker; she gets acquainted with him, and she develops feelings for him soon after. Shun proceeds to hunt down his other bullies, torturing and killing each of them. During the process, he reunites with Jun Shirakawa and his twin sister Kaname, who were classmates with Shun. Upon confronting the leader of the bullies, Kyou Shigoku, he is revealed to be the leader of a cult called The Revolutionary Club, and he is accompanied by his researchers, people working for him in the Revolutionary Club; the most notable are Momoki and Andou.

Jun and Shun are forced to play a twisted game of rock, paper, scissors in which the loser of each round decides the fate of his sibling, Kakeru and Kaname for Shun and Jun respectively. In the last round, the game gets interrupted by Shun's grandfather, who has escaped his imprisonment. He dispatches two of the researchers before Andou kills him with a chainsaw. Shun, after seeing his family get killed, attacks Kyou one last time before he gets left alone at the crime scene, ultimately getting him arrested for 5 years.

=== Post time-skip ===
During the time-skip, Uruma loses his memories before joining an organization dedicated to targeting criminals called "Juujika-san". He is wearing a cross mask and a black robe to cover his identity while working for the organisation. After he regains his memories, Shun tracks down Andou to a remote island that's owned by the Revolutionary Club and he travels towards it as a supposed new recruit. On the island he meets Reo and Hanaoka. Reo is the adopted daughter of Kurusu, another recruiter of the Revolutionary Club. After Shun gets discovered, he gets tortured by Andou. He eventually escapes and tortures Andou and Kurusu to death with Reo. He retrieves a phone and with Andou's fingerprint to track Kyou.

Dr. Kitami, Kawana and Shun return to "Juujika-san" and everything goes back to normal for a while before Jun abducts Shun and he makes him watch the death of Azuma, who is revealed to be a clone of the real girl. Shun remembers how he lost his memory, which is revealed to be because of Jun shooting him with a gun. After that they decide to return to the place where it all started, the middle school Shun shared with Kyou. Along the way he meets a colleague of his grandfather in the Kitayama Corps, Juutarou Kibe who wants to kill the Uruma bloodline because Noboru stole a girl that he liked, and Shun manages to defeat him. He and Kawana are confronted in front of the school by the parents of the bullies he killed.

Shun then makes his way inside, seeing Kyou and they have a conversation before he enters a machine that returns him to his childhood. It is revealed that Shun and Kyou were best friends before he went rogue and start bullying him. Shun soon gets forced by Kyou to play a twisted version of a game that he has to choose which woman that is close to him die until the last one standing becomes his girlfriend. The women there are Azuma, Kawana, Hanaoka, Oota (a police officer that knows Shun from before the time skip), and the wife of a police officer that Shun killed. As the game progresses Shun does everything that he can do to not kill anyone but he is forced to press a button, which kills the police officer. From that point onwards Kyou forces the game to continue, and a computer generated arrow chooses Hanaoka as the next target. After her death the arrow chooses Azuma, who is injected with a serum created by Momoki that makes her lose all of her senses before she died as well. Reo successfully interrupts the game when she brings in a baby that is mummified, revealed to be a child of Kyou and Momoki. The current latest chapter reveals Shun escaping with the rest of the girls that has survived and Reo, and how Kyou "kills" the baby with a shotgun before aiming at Shun. Luckily for Shun and Reo, Momoki kisses Kyou as they escape. After that Kyou hits Momoki and the readers are revealed a flashback that shows the start of a sex scene between Momoki and Kyou.

Later Shun and Kyou finally face off which results in both Kyou and Uruma's deaths.

== Characters ==
=== Main ===
Shun Uruma (漆間 俊, Uruma Shun)
A kind-hearted high-school boy whose parents were killed and younger brother hospitalized by childhood bullies when he was only 12-years-old, leading him down a path of vengeance on the five. Shun Uruma was bullied by five classmates when he was in elementary school. The abuse was so horrific that it left Shun Uruma physically and mentally scarred. Despite this, he vows to avenge his parents' death and younger brother's comatose on the bullies who have made his life horrible during his high school years. He succeeded in killing four of them and planned on taking down Kyou himself, but the mastermind had formed new allies and was revealed to be the leader of a cult called the Revolution Club, shocking Uruma. After his deadly match with Kyou, he failed to kill the leader of the bullies, who had escaped with Andou, Jun, and Momoki from the gym as he is arrested for the murder of Anzai Zenichi for 5 years. Following his imprisonment, 21-year-old Uruma lost his memories due to Jun's assassination attempt before he meets Kitami who recruits him in his organization, "Juujika-san". He finally kills Kyou but dies from the poison Momoki injected him.
Chizuru Azuma (東 千鶴, Azuma Chizuru)
A normal high-schooler who became involved in Uruma's life after he saved her from a psychotic rapist. This later results in her developing feelings for Uruma while getting rescued by him on several occasions. Despite knowing about Shun's dark past and secret, she still believes in him and wishes to support him by any means necessary. Out of all the major supporting female characters in Part I, Azuma is the only one to have survived. The time skip has her return in a new job with longer hair and reunites with Uruma, who lost his memories while working under Kitami. Shun mostly avoided her feelings due to trying to keep out of her involvement in his revenge, but after the timeskip, he finally seems to reciprocate her feelings for him. She dies at the hands of Momoki.

=== Supporting ===
==== Uruma's Family ====
Noboru Uruma (おじいちゃん, Uruma Noboru)
He is an elderly man of average height and average build, as well as short white hair and a scar on his left eye. He once belonged to the Kure Naval District 100th Special Land Squadron (commonly known as Kitayama Squadron) during World War II, which was a group of skilled assassins. Knowing that his grandson Shun Uruma genuinely wanted revenge on the bullies who made his life a living hell, Noboru taught Shun Uruma how to murder and torture people. He was later killed by one of Kyou's henchmen, Andou Midori, in an attempt to save Kakeru. After the timeskip, more of his past and his real name is revealed by his former comrade and arch-enemy Kibe Juutarou.
Kakeru Uruma (漆間 翔, Uruma Kakeru)
He is the younger brother of Shun Uruma. He has a cheerful personality and a gentle side, such as petting abandoned cats. It is said that he felt lightly that his brother was being bullied. After the transfer of his brother Shun Uruma was decided, he was in a car with his parents and suffered a traffic accident by Kyou, and became unconscious as a result. He later dies at the hands of Kyou as the latter stabs the former with a knife protruding from his back. Kakeru was a nice and caring boy, he loved his brother and he died 3 times but only one time he stopped being alive.
Mr. and Mrs. Uruma
Shun's parents who were killed by the bullies.

==== Meiseki High (明関高校 Meiseki Kōkō) ====
Kaname Shirakawa (白川 要, Shirakawa Kaname)
The younger twin sister of Jun and childhood friend of Uruma. A classmate of Uruma, she always had a crush on him ever since he save her from the same group of bullies who would switch their target from her to Uruma, causing her to feel indebted to her childhood friend. Although she nearly performed in the play Romeo and Juliet with Uruma, unfortunately she was raped by Hiro Madoka, causing her to be traumatized before Uruma murdered Madoka in retaliation for his attack on Kaname. At some point, she and Uruma had sex after going to an amusement park, causing an unaware Jun to eventually think that Uruma raped his sister, which led to his betrayal of his former childhood friend. During the Rock, Paper, Scissors match, she was kidnapped by the Revolution Club before dying at the hands of Momoki Sanae, the Revolution Club member who sliced off her right arm and her left leg, as a result of her brother having lost two matches to Uruma. Her death would be the catalyst for a series of botched surgeries performed by her brother on multiple women with the same hiragana characters in her name during the Jun arc.
Jun Shirakawa (白川 純, Shirakawa Jun)
The older twin brother of Kaname, he is very protective of her and is also a childhood friend of Shun. At some point in the story, when his younger sister gets raped, he mistakenly believes that Uruma was responsible for his younger sister's rape, causing him to join Kyou's cult just so he could inflict suffering on Uruma before realizing his mistake and later switching sides to make up for the suffering he caused him. His fate regarding the incident involving him, Kyou's cult, and Uruma was left ambiguous until he made a phone call through Andou's phone to Kitami. It was then revealed that he abused multiple girls into donning his late sister's appearances while being in relationships with them. He was eventually revealed to have caused Uruma's memory loss after shooting him with a gun before kidnapping him and tricking him into thinking that Azuma Chizuru died (who in reality is actually in a room watching the confrontation between Jun and Uruma unfold). He later commits suicide via gunshot to his mouth after snapping out of Kyou's trance. His body was later taken away by Momoki and Masashi before the police could even retrieve it.
Anna Sugisaki (杉崎 杏奈, Sugisaki Anna)
Kyou's cousin and Kuga's girlfriend who is later killed by the latter.

==== Metropolitan Police Department ====
Zen'ichi Anzai (安西 全一, Anzai Zen'ichi)
A cop who investigated Shun and the bullies before getting killed by the former due to witnessing his murder of Kuga, becoming the only innocent Uruma killed. His recording of his incident with Uruma would later allow his assistant, Oota, to arrest Uruma and prevent him from committing his final revenge, leading to the second part of the story with his wife taking over the case.
Asako Oota (太田 朝子, Ōta Asako)
Anzai's partner involved in the case revolving around the accident that claimed the lives of Shun Uruma's parents. She is described as easy-going and stupid despite her job as a police officer. Furthermore, she is also very kind as she offers accommodation to Uruma when her house was burnt down by Kuga Daichi. After discovering Uruma's true colors and her involvement in Anzai Zenichi's death, she becomes more serious and cold towards Uruma and later arrests him as she is a suspect in the suspicious death of her former mentor. Still, she wanted to help Uruma get his sentence reduced or canceled if she would tell about what happened in the old elementary school and Uruma's family case and know if it was really him who voluntarily eliminated Zenichi. After Uruma is sentenced to prison, Asako wants to investigate further the Uruma family case to find out not only all the mysteries of it but also why it is connected to other cases. Five years later, she becomes a police inspector and begins to investigate the "Juujika-san" case together with Anzai Mizuki, Zenichi's wife.
Mizuki Anzai (安西 瑞紀, Anzai Mizuki)
The wife of the late Anzai Zenichi, who works as a detective for the Metropolitan Police Department. She currently works on the case of Uruma Shun with Oota Asako, in replacement of her husband for the second half of the story. Despite deducting Uruma's sympathetic past and revenge against Kyou, she still struggles to find peace with him due to his murder of her husband.

==== Juujika-san (十字架さん) ====
Kougo Kitami (北見 高梧, Kitami Kōgo)
The leader of "Juujika-san" who helps people kill their tormentors as long as they pay him a lot of money. The mysterious leader of the group, he disguises his assassination business as a "clinic" so that he could be able to run it without getting caught by the police. Uruma worked for Kitami ever since the post-time skip after the two meet following Jun's assassination attempt on Uruma. He, Uruma, and Kawana are very close friends outside their business hours.
Mimi Kawana (川奈 美々, Kawana Mimi)
Kitami's assistant.

=== Antagonists ===
Kyou Shigoku (至極 京, Shigoku Kyou)
The main antagonist of the manga and Uruma's archenemy who is the leader of the group of bullies who tormented him in their childhoods. Kyou sets himself apart as completely apathetic, cruel, and psychopathic compared to the other four. He is a talented person who has passed the prefectural preparatory school with a perfect score and aspires to the medical school, but he continues to bully Uruma by calling him "Experiment A" how much he should bully Shun Uruma to commit suicide. He is the earliest to notice Shun Uruma's revenge and is said to seem to enjoy his revenge. After the death of the bullies, it is revealed that he amassed a cult called the Revolution Club with many followers.He later had Uruma and Jun play a match that led to the deaths of Kaname, Kakeru, and Shun Uruma Sr. before escaping with Andou, Jun, and Momoki. 5 years later, Kyou has longer hair and his scar is healed with his cult now growing in numbers. Later in the manga, it is shown that he and Uruma had been friends before they played a game called the "choking game" where a person chokes the other player do induce a near-death experience, which caused Kyou to become who he is today. Later he dies in agony at the hands of Uruma.

==== Uruma's Bullies ====
Daichi Kuga (久我 大地, Kuga Daichi)
He is one of the five bullies who mistreated Shun in their childhood. Shun and Daichi are the same in high school, and the big monster continues to mistreat his victim even when they are in high school. Daichi was a fierce man who won the national junior high school judo tournament in the 90 kg class, and when he mistreated Shun, he used violence and physically damaged him. Later Shun beats him and later kills him as the fourth victim.
Hiro Madoka (円 比呂, Madoka Hiro)
He is a member of the group that bullied Shun. He is a fanatic who can lick his shoes without hesitation if he is to be recognized by Kyou. One of his special talents is creating poisonous drinks and forcing people to drink them. He attacks Shun at the school festival in order to earn Kyou's approval, only to fail and instead raping Kaname as a result of her eavesdropping on his plan to attack Uruma. He later becomes Shun's third victim.
Yuuga Ushiro (右代 悠牙, Ushiro Yūga)
Yuuga Ushiro is a member of the group of children who bullied Shun back in their childhoods. He is a playboy who is called "Yarichin" in the sixth grade of elementary school. Yuuga is involved in crimes such as prostitution and drug trafficking in high school. In addition, Yuga is a deluded teenager who confined a girl by the name of Karen Sakuraba at his home and sexually assaulted her. Later he is tortured by Shun and Karen, eventually dying as the second victim.
Katsumi Senkouji (千光寺 克美, Senkōji Katsumi)
Katsumi Senkouji is also a member of the bullying group. He was originally on good terms with Shun until he resorted to bullying his former friend by shooting Shun with an air gun. Senkouji later became the first target of his victim's revenge, dying after being tortured severely by Uruma.

==== The Revolution Club (革命倶楽部 Kakumei Kurabu) ====
Midori Andou (安堂 緑, Andō Midori)
A member of the Revolutions Club. Being the most loyal cultist out of the four (including Miguel, Momoki, and Nogi) researchers, he is very talented in not only hand-to-hand combat, but also torture methodologies. Ever since Kyou taught him how to properly torture people, he has been loyal to the psychopath as a result. He is responsible for not only kidnapping Shun's younger brother, Kakeru, but also mutilating the young child's leg and later murdering Noboru Uruma. After the events revolving around the match, he, Kyou, Jun, and Momoki, all escaped before the police could arrest them. Five years later, he is seen, along with Momoki and two other unidentified researchers, meeting up with Kyou during a meeting. He later dies at the hands of Uruma by being burned to death following his torture on a Revolutionary Club island.
Sanae Momoki (百木 早苗, Momoki Sanae)
A member of the Revolutions Club. Being the quietest member, she was initially a witness to the cult activities. However, she was later revealed to be more involved in the cult's activities as she takes Shun to his and Kyou's former elementary school for a "match". During the match, she mutilates Kaname twice when Jun lost 2 rounds of "Rock, Paper, Scissors" before wheeling her lifeless body to the older twin brother. She also held Kakeru hostage before Andou attempted to kill the both of them, only for her to drop Kakeru before escaping. She later escapes the gym with Andou, Jun, and Kyou, before they could get arrested by the police. Five years later, she enters a room with Andou and two other unidentified researchers for a meeting with Kyou. Following Andou's death, she plays the most active role as Kyou's remaining right-hand.
Takashi Nogi (能義 隆, Nogi Takashi)
A member of the Revolutionary Club. Being the shortest member, he is very bad-tempered and prone to using violence towards anyone in general. He was seen holding Kakeru hostage with a knife when threatening Uruma if he didn't participate in the Rock-Paper-Scissors match with Jun. At some point, he repeatedly kicks Shun in the head while berating him after the latter's remaining family members die before the short man gets his face ripped off by the teenager and punched on the head, knocking him to the ground as he dies.
Miguel (美外留, Migeru)
A member of the Revolutions Club. Being a tall and muscular man, he is very charismatic and well-mannered despite his appearance. However, like the other members of the Revolutions Club, he is just as twisted, cruel, and violent as them during their tortures of their own members. He gets his left eye gouged out by Shun before attempting to twist his head, only for Noboru Uruma to rip out his vein, instantly killing him.

=== Others ===
Daki Kawashima
A servant of Ushiro.
Karen Sakuraba (桜庭 花蓮, Sakuraba Karen)
A girl who was kidnapped and abused by Ushiro, she later gets her revenge on her abusive boyfriend before committing suicide.
Ganno (雁野)
A minion of Ushiro who was sent by the psychopath to rape Chizuru Azuma. Being gigantic for a teenager himself, he is also very abusive and misogynistic as he views women as sex objects and even threatens to beat those who dare resist his sexual advances. At some point, when he attempts to attack Azuma, he is confronted by "Bikerman" (who is actually Shun Uruma wearing a bicycle helmet to cover up his identity) and the bigger man seems to have gained the upper hand in their fight only for the tables to turn once Uruma dislocates the bigger monster's joints, temporarily. He later joins the Revolution Club, attempting to assault Kawana until Uruma intervened, leaving them to finish off what they started.After clashing with Uruma he realises that Uruma is the "Bikerman" (as Uruma wears a helmet during the fight), but instead of killing uruma he expresses his gratitude as for, he realised true consent in jail due to Uruma and then kills all the rest of Revolutionary group members hunting uruma in the hospital.He was beheaded by the Hands of Uruma Grandfather's comrade, Kibe Juutarou.
Maki
A prostitute who works under Ushiro.
Juutarou Kibe (木部 十太郎, Kibe Jūtarō)
Noboru Uruma's comrade, a former member of the Kitayama Corps, a man whose performance was acknowledged by Noboru Uruma. He was a homicidal psychopath from his younger age and resorted to WWI when he was 15 year old in order to quench his bloodthirst, his achievements were acknowledged and thus he was admitted into the Kitayama Corps. After WWII, he resorted to be a part of Yakuza and Government in order to further quench his bloodthirst and murdered a lot of peoples.He became a part of Revolutionary group on 2 conditions: he asks Kyou for soldier who would abide by him and wants Kyou to make a perfect place to torture Uruma and kill him. He also created a group of highly skilled soldier who possess same techniques as of Kityama corps and named it "Neo Kitayama Corps".

== Media ==
=== Manga ===
Jūjika no Rokunin, written and illustrated by Shiryuu Nakatake, began serialization in Kodansha's monthly shōnen manga magazine Bessatsu Shōnen Magazine on March 9, 2020. The manga was serialized in the magazine until October 9 of the same year, and was then transferred to the publisher's Magazine Pocket online platform starting on November 5 of the same year. Kodansha has collected its chapters into individual tankōbon volumes. The first volume was released on August 7, 2020. As of March 9, 2026, twenty-four volumes have been released.

In France, the manga is licensed by Delcourt/Tonkam, and in Italy by Star Comics.

==== Volumes ====
No.	Release date	ISBN
1	August 7, 2020	978-4-06-520122-0
Chapter 1: Human Subject A's Transformation (実験体Aの変革, Jikken-tai A no Henkaku); Chapter 2: The Last Test (最後の試験, Saigo no Shiken); Chapter 3: A Single-Minded Desire (一途な想い, Ichizu na Omoi); Chapter 4: Uruma's Dissection - Pure Love Song (漆間解剖純愛歌, Uruma Kaibō Jun'aika)
2	February 9, 2021	978-4-06-522028-3
Chapter 5: The First (一人目, Hitorime); Chapter 6: Aftermath (余波, Yoha); Chapter 7: Favorite (本命, Honmei); Chapter 8: Lust (肉欲, Nikuyoku); Chapter 9: Hotel 303 (ホテル 303); Chapter 10: I Think I Like You (好きかも, Suki Kamo); Chapter 11: Gentle Man (やさしい男, Yasashī Otoko); Chapter 12: Ganno's Consent (合意の雁野, Gōi no Ganno); Chapter 13: Bikerman (バイクマン, Baikuman); Chapter 14: The Path of Flesh (肉の道, Niku no Michi)
3	May 7, 2021	978-4-06-523158-6
Chapter 15: Kiss (口づけ, Kuchizuke); Chapter 16: Wow (わぉっ, Waō...); Chapter 17: If It Opens Any Further... (これ以上開いたら, Kore Ijō Hira Itara...); Chapter 18: Meat Toy (肉便器, Niku Benki); Chapter 19: Inside (ナカ, Naka); Chapter 20: I Love You (愛してる, Aishiteru); Chapter 21: Disposal (後処理, Atoshori); Chapter 22: Shit, Shit, Shit... (クソクソクソ..., Kuso Kuso Kuso...); Chapter 23: Twins (双子, Futago); Chapter 24: Target (標的, Hyōteki); Chapter 25: Kiss Scene (キスシーン, Kisu Shīn); Chapter 26: Witness (目撃者, Mokugekisha); Chapter 27: The Night Before (前夜, Zen'ya); Chapter 28: Throw Up and Diarrhea (ピーピーゲェゲェ, Pīpī Gēgē); Chapter 29: Punishment (懲らしめ, Korashime)
4	September 9, 2021	978-4-06-524824-9
Chapter 30: Violence (凶行, Kyōkō); Chapter 31: Fair and Square (正々堂々, Seiseidōdō); Chapter 32: To Those Who Make and Who Destroy (作る側と壊す側, Tsukuru Gawa to Kowasu Gawa); Chapter 33: Thumb Crushing (サムキン, Samu Kin); Chapter 34: Scotch Tape (セロハンテープ, Serohan Tēpu); Chapter 35: Kyou-chaan! (京ちゃぁん!!); Chapter 36: Torn to Pieces (ちぎれっ, Chigirē...); Chapter 37: The Truth Is (本当は, Hontō wa); Chapter 38: Be Strong (強く, Tsuyoku); Chapter 39: The Fourth (四人目, Yoninme); Chapter 40: Flames (炎, Honō); Chapter 41: Is That Okay? (いいよね?, Īyone?); Chapter 42: Finger Casino (指カジノ, Yubi Kajino)
5	December 9, 2021	978-4-06-526271-9
Chapter 43: Familiar Girl (似ている女, Niteiru Onna); Chapter 44: Girl's Clothing (女装, Josō); Chapter 45: Anna's Secret (杏奈の秘密, Anna no Himitsu); Chapter 46: Dedication (献身, Kenshin); Chapter 47: An Evil Named Kuga (久我という名の悪, Kuga Toiuna no Aku); Chapter 48: The Time Has Come (時は来た, Toki wa Kita); Chapter 49: Going All Out (全面的に, Zenmen-teki ni); Chapter 50: Grip Strength (掴む力, Tsukamu Chikara); Chapter 51: Barrel (ドラム缶, Doramukan); Chapter 52: Carnivorous Mantis Shrimp (シャコ (肉食), Shako (Nikushoku)); Chapter 53: This Whole Time (ずっとこうしたかった, Zutto Kōshita Katta); Chapter 54: The Thing I Wanted (欲しかったもの, Hoshi Katta Mono)
6	March 9, 2022	978-4-06-527263-3
Chapter 55: Uncovered (剥き出し, Mukidashi); Chapter 56: "Kill" ("殺す", "Korosu"); Chapter 57: Anzai Zen'ichi (安西全一); Chapter 58: Not Yet (まだ, Mada); Chapter 59: Aftermath (後処理, Atoshori); Chapter 60: I Don't Know (わからない, Wakaranai); Chapter 61: It's Okay (もう大丈夫, Mō Daijōbu); Chapter 62: Overwrite (上書きして, Uwagakishite); Chapter 63: Would Have Been Perfect (完璧だったはずだ, Kanpeki Datta Hazuda); Chapter 64: Something to Say (話があるんだ, Hanashi ga Arunda); Chapter 65: Flawless (天衣無縫, Ten'imuhō); Chapter 66: Wake Up (目が覚めて, Me ga Samete)
7	June 9, 2022	978-4-06-528166-6
Chapter 67: Big Brother (お兄ちゃん, Onī-chan); Chapter 68: A Good Match (相性がいい人, Aishō ga Ī Hito); Chapter 69: Revolution Soldier (革命戦士, Kakumei Senshi); Chapter 70: Calling You (呼んでるよ, Yonderu yo); Chapter 71: Cleanup (総仕上げ, Sōshiage); Chapter 72: Rock, Paper, Scissors (じゃんけん, Janken); Chapter 73: Sense of Pain (痛覚, Tsūkaku); Chapter 74: Round 2 (2回目で, Ni Kaime de); Chapter 75: Jun and Kaname (純と要, Jun to Kaname); Chapter 76: Left C (左のC, Hidari no C); Chapter 77: Fret Saw (糸鋸, Itonoko); Chapter 78: Kitayama Corps Survivor (北山部隊の生き残り, Kitayama Butai no Ikinokori)
8	September 9, 2022	978-4-06-529089-7
Chapter 79: Voice Recorder (ボイスレコーダー, Boisu Rekōdā); Chapter 80: Grandfather (祖父, Sofu); Chapter 81: The Game Continues (ゲーム続行, Gēmu Zokkō); Chapter 82: Andou's Belief (安堂の信条, Andō no Shinjō); Chapter 83: Strong Guy (強い奴, Tsuyoi Yatsu); Chapter 84: The Face of a Murderer (人殺しの顔, Hitogoroshi no Kao); Chapter 85: Got Him! (届いた!!, Todoita!!); Chapter 86: See You Later (またね, Matane); Chapter 87: I Won't Forgive You (許さない, Yurusanai); Chapter 88: Stronger (強く, Tsuyoku); Chapter 89: "Juujika-san" ("十字架さん"); Chapter 90: Stimulant Addiction (シャブ漬け, Shabu Zuke); Chapter 91: Specialist (専門家, Senmonka)
9	December 9, 2022	978-4-06-529950-0
Chapter 92: The Big Special One (ビッグでスペシャルなやつ, Biggu de Supesharu na Yatsu); Chapter 93: Ding Dong (ピンポーン, Pin Pōn); Chapter 94: Restarting (再会, Saikai); Chapter 95: The Day of "Juujika" (あの日の"ジュージカ", Ano Hi no "Jūjika"); Chapter 96: Rusk (ラスク, Rasuku); Chapter 97: Gonda (権田); Chapter 98: Bavarian Cream (ババロア, Babaroa); Chapter 99: Sphincter (括約筋, Katsuyakukin); Chapter 100: Kyou-chan (京ちゃん); Chapter 101: Date(1) (デート1, Dēto(1)); Chapter 102: Date(2) (デート2, Dēto(2)); Chapter 103: I Won't Let Anyone (誰にも渡さない, Dare ni mo Watasanai)
10	March 9, 2023	978-4-06-530914-8
Chapter 104: Welcome Back (おかえり, Okaeri); Chapter 105: Gramp's Letter (祖父の手紙, Sofu no Tegami); Chapter 106: Demon (鬼, Oni); Chapter 107: Kitami's Foundation (北見の根拠, Kitami no Konkyo); Chapter 108: Revolution Club Seminar (革命倶楽部セミナー, Kakumei Kurabu Seminā); Chapter 109: Revolution Island (革命島, Kakumei Jima); Chapter 110: Good News (嬉しいお知らせ, Ureshī Oshirase); Chapter 111: Lock-On (ロックオン, Rokku-On); Chapter 112: Fertilizer (肥料, Hiryō); Chapter 113: Revolution Test (革命の試練, Kakumei no Shiren); Chapter 114: Reo (麗央); Chapter 115: Kurusu's Hobby (来栖の趣味, Kurusu no Shumi)
11	June 8, 2023	978-4-06-531872-0
Chapter 116: Nothing More Can Be Done (万事休す, Banji Kyūsu); Chapter 117: The Weight of One Leg (片足の重さ, Katāshi no Omosa); Chapter 118: Celebration (お祝い, Oiwai); Chapter 119: Sanctuary (聖域, Seīki); Chapter 120: Annihilation (全滅, Zenmetsu); Chapter 121: One More Person (もう一人, Mō Hitori); Chapter 122: Nurse and Bikini Model (ナースとグラドル, Nāsu to Guradoru); Chapter 123: Going to be Killed (殺されちゃう..., Korosare-chā...); Chapter 124: I Made It (来ちゃった, Ki-chatta); Chapter 125: Welcome (ウェルカム, Uerukamu); Chapter 126: Strong Chainsaw (激強チェーンソー, Gekitsuyo Chēnsō); Chapter 127: Even If I Can't Grip (握れなくても, Nigire Nakute mo)
12	August 8, 2023	978-4-06-532594-0
Chapter 128: Time of Judgment (断罪の時間, Danzai no Jikan); Chapter 129: I Was Killed (殺されちゃった, Korosare-chatta); Chapter 130: Torn to Shreds (千切れちゃう, Chigire-chā); Chapter 131: The Receiving Side (られる側, Rareru Gawa); Chapter 132: Because I Loved Him (好きだったから, Suki Datta Kara); Chapter 133: Hot!! (アツっ!!, Atsū!!); Chapter 134: Setting an Example (見せしめ, Miseshime); Chapter 135: The King of Moo Moo Street (モー下の王, Mō Shita no Kingu)
13	October 6, 2023	978-4-06-533144-6
Chapter 136: Whoever He's Interested In (お気に入り, Oki ni Iri); Chapter 137: The Unvaccinated Dog's Euthanasia (ワクチン接種してない犬の刑, Wakuchin Sesshu-shitenai Inu no Kei); Chapter 138: Sparganum Proliferum (芽殖孤虫, Gashokukochū); Chapter 139: Y-Yes, That's Me? (私のですけど?, Watashi no Desu Kedo?); Chapter 140: Sharp Glaring Eyes (敵意ある鋭い眼光, Tekīaru Surudoi Gankō); Chapter 141: 3HITS; Chapter 142: It's Been 5 Years (5年ぶりかな, Gonen Buri Kana); Chapter 143: Discomfort (違和感, Iwakan)
14	December 7, 2023	978-4-06-533883-4
Chapter 144: Master (彼氏様, Kareshi-sama); Chapter 145: Help (たすけて, Tasukete); Chapter 146: Kaname's DNA (要のDNA, Kaname no DNA); Chapter 147: Rendezvous (約束の場所, Yakusoku no Basho); Chapter 148: You're Still Alive (生きてるんだもん, Ikiterundamon); Chapter 149: Jun's Theater (純くん劇場, Jun-kun Gekijō); Chapter 150: Uruo and Kanamet (ウルオとカナメット, Uruo to Kanametto); Chapter 151: She Looks Fine (具合がいいんだぁ, Guai ga Īndā)
15	May 9, 2024	978-4-06-534546-7
Chapter 152: I Got Carried Away (やりすぎちゃった, Yarisugi-chatta); Chapter 153: Aren't We Friends...? (友達だったでしょ...?, Tomodachi Datta Desho...?); Chapter 154: Oh, I See (あ そっか, A Sokka); Chapter 155: Don't Fuck With Me!! (ふざけるなぁー!!, Fuzakerunā!!); Chapter 156: Detective's Intuition (刑事の勘, Keiji no Kan); Chapter 157: Cutting Off a Lizard's Tail (トカゲの尻尾切り, Tokage no Shippo Kiri); Chapter 158: Kaname Manuel (カナメマニュアル, Kaname Manyuaru); Chapter 159: The Last Revenge (最後の復讐, Saigo no Fukushū)
16	July 9, 2024	978-4-06-536118-4
Chapter 160: Thank You (ありがとう, Arigatō); Chapter 161: The Matured Experiment A (実験体Aの成熟, Jikken-tai A no Seijuku); Chapter 162: The Blooming Spring (花開く春, Hana Hiraku Haru); Chapter 163: Revolutionary City (革命都市, Kakumei Toshi); Chapter 164: Are You...A Woman? (お前...女?, Omae...Onna?); Chapter 165: No-Consent Mode (合意不要モード, Gōi Fuyō Mōdo); Chapter 166: Consensual Tool (合意道具, Gōi Dōgu); Chapter 167: Returning the Favor (恩返し, On Kaeshi)
17	September 9, 2024	978-4-06-536754-4
Chapter 168: Aha... (アハっ...); Chapter 169: Slash'Em, Stab'Em, Carve'Em (切って刺して刻める, Kitte Sashite Kizameru); Chapter 170: It's Rather Tasty (なかなか美味いぞ?, Naka Naka Umai Zo?); Chapter 171: Kitayama Special Trap (北山部隊特製の罠, Kitayama Butai Tokusei no Wana); Chapter 172: Oh, That's Right! (そーだ, Sō da!); Chapter 173: A Hero Appears (ヒーロー見参, Hīrō Kenzan); Chapter 174: I Hate You, I Hate You, I Hate You (憎い憎い憎い, Nikui Nikui Nikui); Chapter 175: Eikoooooo!! (エイ子ぉぉぉ!!, Eikoooo!)
18	November 8, 2024	978-4-06-537422-1
Chapter 176: So You Came Back?! (蘇ってきよったか!!!, Yomigaette Kiyotta ka!!!); Chapter 177: It's All Bullshit (どうせウソ, Dōse Uso); Chapter 178: Preparations Are Set (準備万端だよ, Junbi Bantan da yo); Chapter 179: The Final Revengers (最後の復讐者, Saigo no Fukushū-sha); Chapter 180: Shun Uruma Memorial Hall (うるましゅん記念館, Uruma Shun Kinenkan); Chapter 181: Erased Memory (消し去った記憶, Keshisatta Kioku); Chapter 182: Gathering (団欒, Danran); Chapter 183: Innocent (無邪気, Mujaki)
19	January 8, 2025	978-4-06-538051-2
Chapter 184: Rabbit Hutch (うさぎ小屋, Usagi Koya); Chapter 185: Choking Game (失神ゲーム, Shisshin Gēmu); Chapter 186: True Hell (本当の地獄, Hontō no Jigoku); Chapter 187: Look At You Shine (ピッカピカ, Pikka Pika); Chapter 188: First Sinner: Senkouji Katsumi (一人目 千光寺の場合, Hitori-me Senkōji no Bāi); Chapter 189: Second Sinner: Ushiro Yuuga (二人目 右代の場合, Futari-me Ushiro no Bāi); Chapter 190: Third Sinner: Madoka Hiro (三人目 円の場合, Sannin-me Madoka no Bāi); Chapter 191: Fourth Sinner: Kuga Daichi (四人目 久我の場合, Yonin-me Kuga no Bāi); Chapter 192: Fifth Sinner: Shigoku Kyou (五人目 至極の場合, Gonin-me Shigoku no Bāi)
20	April 9, 2025	978-4-06-538982-9
Chapter 193: Choice (選択, Sentaku); Chapter 194: Love-Matching Game (ドキドキマッチング, Doki Doki Macchingu); Chapter 195: Azuma's Choice (東千鶴の選択, Azuma Chizuru no Sentaku); Chapter 196: I Can't Choose (選べない, Erabenai); Chapter 197: Game Show (余興, Yokyō); Chapter 198: Justice (正義, Seigi); Chapter 199: Decide Their Deaths (どう殺したい?, Dō Koroshitai?); Chapter 200: Countdown To Death (死のカウントダウン, Shi no Kauntodaun)
21	July 9, 2025	978-4-06-539996-5
Chapter 201: You're in Luck (君はラッキー, Kimi wa Rakkī); Chapter 202: Let Us Observe (観察しよう, Kansatsu-shiyō); Chapter 203: Stupid Game (馬鹿げたゲーム, Baka-geta Gēmu); Chapter 204: Kawana's Unfinished Business (川奈の残したこと, Kawana no Noko-shita Koto); Chapter 205: Please Don't Die... (死なないで..., Shinanai de...); Chapter 206: Sana's Special Poison (早苗特製の毒, Sana Tokusei no Doku); Chapter 207: One At A Time (一つずつ, Hitotsu Zutsu); Chapter 208: You're Late (遅いよ, Osoi yo)
22	October 9, 2025	978-4-06-541092-9
Chapter 209: Let 'Em Go!!! (はなじでぇぇぇ!!!, Hanaji dē!); Chapter 210: Cute Baby (可愛い赤ちゃん, Kawaī Aka-Chan); Chapter 211: Special Connection (特別な繋がり, Tokubetsu-na Tsunagari); Chapter 212: It's My Fault (僕のせいで, Boku no Sei de); Chapter 213: What Is Left (残っていたもの, Nokotte-ita Mono); Chapter 214: He's Coming Back (帰ってくる, Kaette-kuru); Chapter 215: Bloodstained Privilege (血塗られた特権, Chinu-rareta Tokken); Chapter 216: Not Evil Enough (悪が足りない, Aku ga Tarinai)
23	January 8, 2026	978-4-06-542195-6
Chapter 217: My Intent Is To Kill You (君への殺意, Kimi e no Satsui); Chapter 218: No Big Deal (造作もない, Zousa mo Nai); Chapter 219: Payback (意趣返し, Ishu Gaeshi); Chapter 220: Dead End (袋小路, Fukurokōji); Chapter 221: Empty (空っぽ, Sorappo); Chapter 222: Stage Show (彩り, Irodori); Chapter 223: Love (愛, Ai); Chapter 224: Just Like Azuma (東さんと同じ, Azuma-san to Onaji)
24	March 9, 2026	978-4-06-543183-2
Chapter 225: Hiding Something (隠し事, Kakushi Goto); Chapter 226: Sorry (ごめん, Gomen); Chapter 227: Human Pain (人の痛み, Hito no Itami); Chapter 228: A Taste of Your Own Medicine (同じ苦しみ, Onaji Kurushimi); Chapter 229: Apology (謝罪, Shazai); Chapter 230: Where Am I Heading? (向かう先, Mukau Saki); Chapter 231: Memory of Justice (正義の記憶, Seigi no Kioku); Chapter 232: The Sixth (六人目, Roku Nin-me)

== Reception ==
By March 2022, the manga had over 1 million copies in circulation, over 3.5 million copies in circulation by May 2024, and over 4.5 million copies in circulation by January 2025.

Manga Sanctuary called the manga first volume exciting and excellent with a quest for revenge in Dexter Morgan's background, stating the manga is captivating from start to finish and downright dark at times. AnimeClick.it felt that the manga is extreme and bloody and similar to Dexter with the brutality of Saw and Hostel, said: "Its story is full of disturbing and shocking moments, wildly weird and clearly entertaining," They describe the manga design style as "aggressive", adding: "The characters emotions are often distorted, with antagonists who seem to be the idealized embodiment of pure evil and a protagonist who is brutally violent and seeks revenge."

=== Popularity ===
Jūjika no Rokunin is said to be popular for its themes revolving around bullying and revenge, and was not very popular when it first serialized in Bessatsu Shōnen Magazine in March 2020. The manga was discontinued in the magazine's November issue of that same year due to poor sales of first volume. Later, the manga was transferred to the Magazine Pocket online platform, and Jūjika no Rokunin quickly became one of the most popular manga of the app, and its popularity led to the first three volumes being reprinted. In March 2021, the manga had over 13 million views on Magazine Pocket app "Magapoke". In June 2021, Due to the popularity of the electronic version of the manga, volume sales were 6.6 times higher than paper sales. In May 2022, in first popularity poll of the series, Shun Uruma Sr. ranks first with 50% of votes, in June 2022 popularity poll of the series, Shun Uruma Sr. acquiring the first position with 8633 votes, with Kaname Shirakawa and Shun Uruma acquiring second and third place. In December 2025, Jūjika no Rokunin manga ranked third on "2025 Manga Kingdom Annual Ranking".
