= Aka no Grimoire =

Japanese manga series

- First tankōbon volume cover

赫(あか)のグリモア (Aka no Gurimoa)
- Genre: Dark fantasy
- Manga
- Written by: A-10
- Published by: Kodansha
- Magazine: Bessatsu Shōnen Magazine
- Original run: September 7, 2018 – November 9, 2020
- Volumes: 5
- icon

Aka no Grimoire (Japanese: 赫(あか)のグリモア, Hepburn: Aka no Gurimoa; lit. 'Crimson Grimoire') is a Japanese manga series written and illustrated by A-10. It was serialized in Kodansha's shōnen manga magazine Bessatsu Shōnen Magazine from September 2018 to November 2020, with its chapters collected in five tankōbon volumes.

== Publication ==
Written and illustrated by A-10, Aka no Grimoire was serialized in Kodansha's shōnen manga magazine Bessatsu Shōnen Magazine from September 7, 2018, to November 9, 2020. Kodansha collected its chapters in five tankōbon volumes, released from February 8, 2019, to January 8, 2021.

=== Volumes ===
No.	Japanese release date	Japanese ISBN
1	February 8, 2019	978-4-06-513881-6
2	July 9, 2019	978-4-06-515688-9
3	December 9, 2019	978-4-06-517537-8
4	June 9, 2020	978-4-06-519173-6
5	January 8, 2021	978-4-06-522024-5
