= Grimgar of Fantasy and Ash =

Japanese light novel series and its franchise

- The cover of the first light novel volume featuring (going in clockwise) Haruhiro, Shihoru, Yume, Manato, Moguzo and Ranta

灰と幻想のグリムガル (Hai to Gensō no Gurimugaru)
- Genre: Dark fantasy, isekai
- Light novel
- Written by: Ao Jūmonji
- Illustrated by: Eiri Shirai
- Published by: Overlap
- English publisher: J-Novel Club (digital); Seven Seas Entertainment
- Imprint: Overlap Bunko
- Original run: 25 June 2013 – present
- Volumes: 24 + 2 extra
- Manga
- Written by: Mutsumi Okubashi
- Published by: Square Enix
- English publisher: NA: Yen Press
- Magazine: Gangan Joker
- Original run: 22 April 2015 – 22 June 2016
- Volumes: 3
- Anime television series

Grimgar, Ashes and Illusions
- Directed by: Ryosuke Nakamura
- Produced by: Masaya Saito; Naoki Harada; Shigetoshi Sato
- Written by: Ryosuke Nakamura
- Music by: R.O.N ([K]NoW_NAME)
- Studio: A-1 Pictures
- Licensed by: AUS: Madman; NA: Crunchyroll; UK: Anime Limited
- Original network: AT-X, Tokyo MX, BS11, ABC
- English network: SEA: Animax Asia
- Original run: 11 January 2016 – 28 March 2016
- Episodes: 12 + OVA
- icon

Grimgar of Fantasy and Ash (灰と幻想のグリムガル, Hai to Gensō no Gurimugaru) is a Japanese light novel series written by Ao Jūmonji and illustrated by Eiri Shirai. The story follows a group of people who suddenly find themselves in a fantasy world with no memories from before their arrival, and chronicles their struggles to survive and make a life for themselves as volunteer soldiers.

Mutsumi Okubashi began serializing a manga adaptation in Gangan Joker in 2015. The novels were adapted into a 12-episode anime television series that ran from January to March 2016. An original video animation was released in March 2016. The anime is licensed in North America by Funimation as Grimgar, Ashes and Illusions, while J-Novel Club has acquired the rights to publish the original novels in English and Yen Press published the manga adaptation.

== Plot ==
The story begins by showing a group of novice adventurers battling goblins in a forest. The party seems utterly out of their element and is forced to flee. It is revealed through a flashback that the party, which likely originates from modern Earth, awoke with a large group of people on this world just a few weeks ago. With no memory of how they arrived and no other options they are quickly pressed into service as Trainee Volunteer Soldiers by a mysterious individual named Chief Britney. Some take to this better than others. The lead party is composed of the leftover individuals who did not.

Led by a man named Manato they have banded together, joined class guilds, and begun hunting weak monsters as a way to grow stronger and earn the money they need to survive. Initially things do not go well. Eventually, the party learns to work as a unit and experiences enough success hunting goblins to move from the forest to a ruined city. There, Manato dies saving them from ambush and leaves the responsibility for the group to the thief, Haruhiro. Thrown into despair, the party is fractured and grieves for their lost friend, never having realized just how much Manato did to hold them all together. Once the party comes to terms with their loss, they take in a new Priest named Merry.

Merry is initially distant and broken from the loss of her own party, for which she blames herself, but gradually comes to regard Haruhiro and the party as friends though she remains distant. Back to full strength the party seeks to avenge Manato by striking at the heart of the goblin encampment in the ruins. After slaying the goblin king the party finds closure and decides to help Merry do the same by moving their monster hunting to the kobold-infested mines where her old party fell. Merry's past behind her and the surviving heroes coming to terms with the life and death nature of their time on the world of Grimgar.

== Characters ==
=== Main characters ===
Haruhiro (ハルヒロ)
Voiced by: Yoshimasa Hosoya (Japanese); Ricco Fajardo (English)
The thief of the group. Haruhiro is generally helpful and always willing to help out his party members. He is later forced to become the group's leader after Manato's death. Eventually he starts to pay more attention to his teammates' feelings, slowly improving as leader.
Ranta (ランタ)
Voiced by: Hiroyuki Yoshino (Japanese); Orion Pitts (English)
The dark knight of the group. He is brash, impulsive, and somewhat perverted, which leads him to constantly arguing with Haruhiro. Ranta is the troublemaker of the group constantly causing problems and making rash decisions for he has a slight hint of arrogance in his character. He is also the darkest at heart, repeatedly leaving the group to follow his own ambitions, though he also develops feelings for Yume.
Manato (マナト)
Voiced by: Nobunaga Shimazaki (Japanese); Justin Briner (English)
Manato chose to become a Priest and ultimately assumed the role of the group's initial leader. He saw the positives in people and with that he was able to effectively strategize battle plans when the group began hunting goblins for the first time. As they progressed as a team, they began mapping out abandoned towns while hunting bigger goblin parties. However, while resting the group was ambushed by more goblins than they were accustomed to. Effectively moving his party to retreat, a goblin archer was able to successfully hit Manato square in the back as they ran away successfully. He died soon after. In a conversation after his death, Haruhiro mentioned that aside from missing his leadership and strategist plans, Manato was also a defensive tank like Moguzo and a front line attacker like Ranta.
Moguzo (モグゾー, Moguzō)
Voiced by: Fukushi Ochiai (Japanese); Jarrod Greene (English)
Moguzo is the tallest and heaviest member of the group and hence chose to become a member of the Warrior guild. He wears the most ironclad armor and wields a wide blade broadsword that comes up to shoulder height. Although he is the most physically imposing, he challenges Shihoru for being the most soft spoken. On several occasions he will allow his friends to sleep in and will take their turn at cooking breakfast in the morning. He somewhat remembers doing this before and finding joy out of it. He also would carve wooden figurines of noteworthy quality in his spare time. Moguzo eventually dies of exhaustion, and is replaced by Kuzaku.
Yume (ユメ)
Voiced by: Mikako Komatsu (Japanese); Jeannie Tirado (English)
Brave and energetic, Yume is the Hunter of the group. She sees the rest of the group as family, and has a tendency to try and protect Shihoru because of her shy and timid nature. She later leaves the group for a six-month period to train.
Shihoru (シホル)
Voiced by: Haruka Terui (Japanese); Sarah Wiedenheft (English)
The Mage of the group. She is shy, mainly opening up to Yume and, to an extent, Manato, whom she had a one-sided crush on. She also has an inferiority complex about herself, and Manato's death leaves her devastated but she manages to regain her confidence again as the series goes on.
Mary (メリイ, Merii)
Voiced by: Chika Anzai (Japanese); Jad Saxton (English)
Joining shortly after Manato's death, Mary effectively replaces him as the Priest of the party. Initially, there is a lot of friction between Mary and the rest of the team, due to Manato's irreplaceability and Mary's seemingly uncaring personality. She was actually a lot like Manato, but after a tragic incident that led to the death of some of her friends, she became cold and aloof. However, after Haruhiro tells her about their own situation, she slowly opens to her new party. She calls Haruhiro by the nickname "Haru" ("Hiro" in the English anime dub due to Yume already calling him Haru), and the two eventually fall in love with each other.
Kuzaku (クザク)
The Paladin of the group who joins later, replacing Moguzo.

=== Supporting characters ===
Renji (レンジ)
Voiced by: Tomokazu Seki (Japanese); Jason Liebrecht (English)
A volunteer soldier who arrived at the same time as Haruhiro and the others, but graduated from his position as a trainee much sooner.
Ron (ロン)
Voiced by: Tomokazu Sugita (Japanese); Cris George (English)
Supports Renji. He has brown hair with grey sides, and wears brown and metallic armor.
Adachi (アダチ)
Voiced by: Kenji Nojima (Japanese); Aaron Roberts (English)
Supports Renji. He has dark hair and wears glasses. He wears a black robe with red trim and gold cuffs.
Sassa (サッサ)
Voiced by: Nozomi Furuki (Japanese); Felecia Angelle (English)
Supports Renji. She has long brown hair and a short brown dress and high boots.
Chibi (チビ)
Supports Renji. A petite girl with short blue hair, blue and white dress, and brown boots. She does not have a voice actress listed.
Shinohara (シノハラ)
Voiced by: Hiroki Takahashi (Japanese); Christopher Wehkamp (English)
Leader of Team Orion and an acquaintance of Mary.
Hayashi (ハヤシ)
Voiced by: Hidenobu Kiuchi (Japanese); Christopher Bevins (English)
Supports Team Orion and Shinohara. Formerly supported Team Michiki and a friend of Mary.
Michiki (ミチキ)
Voiced by: Shunsuke Takeuchi (Japanese); Austin Tindle (English)
Leader of Team Michiki. Became an undead following an unsuccessful battle against the savage kobold Death Spots.
Og (オグ, Ogu)
Voiced by: Toshiki Masuda (Japanese); Jessie James Grelle (English)
Supports Michiki. Became an undead following an unsuccessful battle against the savage kobold Death Spots.
Mutsumi (ムツミ)
Voiced by: Haruka Tomatsu (Japanese); Bryn Apprill (English)
Supports Michiki. Became an undead following an unsuccessful battle against the savage kobold Death Spots.
Kikkawa (キッカワ)
Voiced by: Daisuke Namikawa (Japanese); Todd Haberkorn (English)
A carefree man from Tokimune's team who introduced Mary to Haruhiro's team. He has messy brown hair, and wears a green and white robe that covers his brown outfit.
Britney (ブリトニー, Buritonī)
Voiced by: Hiroki Yasumoto (Japanese); Mike McFarland (English)
The Commanding Officer of Red Moon, which is Alterna Frontier Army's Reserve Force. Britney has short red hair with a purple streak, and wears a white vest and shorts, and black boots.
Barbara (バルバラ, Barubara)
Voiced by: Mamiko Noto (Japanese); Jamie Marchi (English)
Haruhiro's Thief master. Barbara has short brown hair and wears glasses. She wears an outfit that has a brown band around her breasts and green shorts, and is outfitted with belts around her waist and legs to hold knives.
Hōnen (ホーネン)
Voiced by: Jōji Nakata (Japanese); Kent Williams (English)
Manato's Priest master. Hōnen is a balding man with long white sideburns and beard. He wears a white robe with blue trim and gold vestment, and wields a staff.

== Media ==
=== Light novel ===
The light novels are written by Ao Jūmonji and illustrated by Eiri Shirai, and are published by Overlap. The first volume was published in 2013. Online English light novel publisher J-Novel Club announced their acquisition of the series on 28 October 2016, and Seven Seas Entertainment publishes a print version as part of their collaboration with J-Novel Club. Seven Seas Entertainment released Volume 14.5 in physical format on 30 March 2021, which included volumes 14+ and 14++.

==== Volumes ====
No.	Original release date	Original ISBN	English release date	English ISBN
1	25 June 2013	978-4-906866-22-9	15 December 2016 (Digital); 6 June 2017 (Physical)	978-1-626926-58-5
2	25 November 2013	978-4-906866-47-2	23 February 2017 (Digital); 8 August 2017 (Physical)	978-1-626926-60-8
3	25 March 2014	978-4-906866-69-4	21 April 2017 (Digital); 10 October 2017 (Physical)	978-1626926-62-2
4	25 July 2014	978-4-906866-91-5	24 June 2017 (Digital); 12 December 2017 (Physical)	978-1-626926-66-0
5	25 February 2015	978-4-86554-026-0	2 September 2017 (Digital); 20 February 2018 (Physical)	978-1-626926-83-7
6	25 October 2015	978-4-86554-072-7	11 November 2017 (Digital); 15 May 2018 (Physical)	978-1-626927-99-5
7	25 December 2015	978-4-86554-086-4	27 January 2018 (Digital); 10 July 2018 (Physical)	978-1-626928-40-4
8	25 March 2016	978-4-86554-114-4	1 April 2018 (Digital); 30 October 2018 (Physical)	978-1-626929-11-1
9	25 August 2016	978-4-86554-149-6	11 June 2018 (Digital); 5 February 2019 (Physical)	978-1-626929-88-3
10	25 March 2017	978-4-86554-202-8	15 August 2018 (Digital); 30 July 2019 (Physical)	978-1-642750-87-4
11	24 July 2017	978-4-86554-234-9	16 October 2018 (Digital); 29 October 2019 (Physical)	978-1-642757-04-0
12	25 February 2018	978-4-86554-283-7	16 December 2018 (Digital); 24 March 2020 (Physical)	978-1-645052-12-8
13	25 June 2018	978-4-86554-346-9	18 February 2019 (Digital); 14 July 2020 (Physical)	978-1-645053-00-2
14	25 December 2018	978-4-86554-429-9	4 June 2019 (Digital); 10 November 2020 (Physical)	978-1-645057-48-2
14+	25 March 2019	978-4-86554-466-4	11 November 2019 (Digital); 30 March 2021 (Physical)	978-1-71830-628-8; 978-1-64505-769-7 (Volume 14.5)
14++	25 June 2019	978-4-86554-512-8	4 May 2020 (Digital); 30 March 2021 (Physical)	978-1-71830-630-1; 978-1-64505-769-7 (Volume 14.5)
15	25 December 2019	978-4-86554-590-6	4 August 2020 (Digital); 29 June 2021 (Physical)	978-1-648275-54-8
16	25 July 2020	978-4-86554-700-9	3 January 2021 (Digital); 30 November 2021 (Physical)	978-1-648273-17-9
17	25 January 2021	978-4-86554-826-6	7 July 2021 (Digital); 1 February 2022 (Physical)	978-1-648274-64-0
18	25 October 2021	978-4-8240-0024-8	14 September 2022 (Digital); 21 February 2023 (Physical)	978-1-63858-264-9
19	25 June 2022	978-4-8240-0187-0	29 December 2022 (Digital); 4 July 2023 (Physical)	978-1-63858-645-6
20	25 April 2024	978-4-8240-0739-1	23 June 2025 (Digital); 30 December 2025 (Physical)	978-1-63858-878-8
21	25 May 2024	978-4-8240-0762-9	31 December 2025 (Digital); 12 May 2026 (Physical)	979-8-89373-625-0
22	25 February 2025	978-4-8240-1028-5	22 April 2026 (Digital); 26 Jan 2027 (Physical)	978-1-71830-646-2
23	25 December 2025	978-4-8240-1372-9	4 November 2026 (Digital)	978-1-71830-648-6
24	20 August 2026	978-4-8240-1788-8	—	—

=== Manga ===
A manga adaptation by Mutsumi Okubashi was serialized in Square Enix's magazine Gangan Joker from 22 April 2015 to 22 June 2016 and collected in three volumes. North American publisher Yen Press announced their acquisition of the manga on 23 November 2016.

==== Volumes ====
No.	Original release date	Original ISBN	English release date	English ISBN
1	22 December 2015	978-4-75754-840-4	20 June 2017	978-0-31655-856-3
2	22 March 2016	978-4-75754-918-0	31 October 2017	978-0-31644-181-0
3	22 August 2016	978-4-75755-082-7	6 February 2018	978-0-31644-182-7

=== Anime ===
An anime television series was written and directed by Ryosuke Nakamura and produced by A-1 Pictures. Mieko Hosoi acted as character designer. Both the opening theme song, "Knew day", and the ending theme, "Harvest", were performed by (K)NoW_NAME. The series was broadcast on AT-X, Tokyo MX, Nippon BS Broadcasting, and the Asahi Broadcasting Corporation from 11 January 2016 (Note: The broadcast date is listed as 10 January 2016 at 24:30, which is 11 January 2016 at 00:30 (12:30 a.m.).) to 28 March 2016. Funimation acquired the rights to simulcast the series with an English dub in North America. The anime is listed with 6 Blu-ray and DVD volumes containing 2 episodes each, having a total of 12 episodes. Anime Limited released the series in the UK. The series was removed from Crunchyroll on July 23, 2026.

A 10-minute original video animation numbered "episode 2.5" was bundled with the first Blu-ray and DVD volume of the anime, which was released on 16 March 2016. Toho streamed a promotional video for the OVA on 5 February 2016.

==== Episodes ====
No.	Title	Directed by	Original release date	Ref.
1	"Whisper, Chant, Prayer, Awaken"; Transliteration: "Sasayaki, Eishō, Inori, Mezameyo" (Japanese: ささやき、詠唱、祈り、目覚めよ)	Mieko Hosoi	11 January 2016	
Haruhiro, Manato, Yume, Shihoru, Ranta, and Moguzo are shown struggling to defeat a goblin in a deep forest of Grimgar. Early the next morning, as they eat breakfast together, they discuss their next plan of action, but they realize that they have no idea where they came from originally. They remember awakening inside a strange tower two weeks ago during nightfall, and they form their own group called Team Manato. Britney, the Commanding Officer of Red Moon, which is Alterna Frontier Army's Reserve Force, registers Team Manato as Trainee Volunteer Soldiers. In order for them to survive and earn money for their needs in the town of Ortana, they must sell their collected horns and claws from their hunted goblins. While the others attend their respective guilds for training purposes, Haruhiro is mentored by Barbara, master of the Thieves Guild, for one week. Later, when Ranta inadvertently comments about Shihoru's figure, Yume aims her bow and arrow at Ranta while consoling Shihoru. On the thirteenth day, Team Manato spots four goblins camping nearby in the forest. However, Haruhiro notes that if today does not work out, there is always tomorrow.
2	"Long Day of the Trainee Volunteer Soldier"; Transliteration: "Minarai Giyū-hei no Nagai Ichinichi" (Japanese: 見習い義勇兵の長い一日)	Tomoko Sudo	18 January 2016	
While the rest of the group is sleeping, Haruhiro and Manato have a drink of freshly made ale. The two share their interest of possibly going to the local Shelly's Tavern together, describe their training experiences with their guild mentors, and take notice of a red crescent moon in the sky. The next day, Team Manato goes in for an attack on a goblin in the forest without a set strategy. As Moguzo seemingly deals the death blow on the goblin, Ranta collects a black wolf's fang and a silver coin hung around the goblin's neck. Although the goblin quickly tries to escape, Ranta repeatedly stabs the goblin to death in regret. After the group trades in the collection for 130 copper coins, they go their separate ways for leisure until the end of the day. They reunite at a bridge to watch the sunset together. At night, Haruhiro and Manato try to prevent Ranta from peeking in the girls' bathhouse, but to no avail.
2.5	"Staking Our Youths on the Bath Wall – One More Centimeter"; Transliteration: "Furo no Kabe ni Kaketa Seishun ―― won moa Senchimētoru" (Japanese: 風呂の壁にかけた青春――one more センチメートル)	Mayuko Kato; Kouhei Hashimoto	16 March 2016	
Outside the girls' bathhouse, Haruhiro, Manato, Ranta, and Moguzo eavesdrop on Yume and Shihoru having a private and personal conversation during their bath. Manto suggests that the boys should quit while they are ahead, causing Ranta to yell in agony. As a thunderstorm begins, Ranta climbs on top of Moguzo in order to peek inside through the window of the girls' bathhouse. However, Moguzo accidentally breaks the wall of the girls' bathhouse and exposes Ranta, prompting Yume to kick Ranta in the face out of anger.
3	"Are Goblin Pouches Filled with Our Dreams?"; Transliteration: "Goburin-bukuro ni wa Oretachi no Yume ga Tsumatteiru ka" (Japanese: ゴブリン袋には俺たちの夢がつまっているか)	Akira Takada	25 January 2016	
Early in the morning, Haruhiro notices that Moguzo has a strong passion for cooking, which started before he ended up in Grimgar. Ranta refuses to apologize for supposedly wrecking the wall of the girls' bathhouse, and Yume slaps him for lying. Team Manato spends the next few days in the rain failing to hunt goblins. They are forced to wear the same clothes everyday, washing their laundry each night before bedtime. The next day, Team Manato enters the ruins of Damuro in a building and kills a sleeping goblin, hauling in four silver coins as the reward. After Team Manato explores Damuro and kills more goblins as a unit, they are able to use their earnings to buy more weapons, clothes, and food. At night in their bedrooms, Yume encourages Shihoru to talk to the guys despite her shyness, while Haruhiro is grateful for Manato being the group leader and his friend. Before bedtime, Haruhiro notes the twenty-third day in Grimgar.
4	"Sky Dancing with Ash"; Transliteration: "Hai no Mau Sora e" (Japanese: 灰の舞う空へ)	Kunihiko Sakurai	1 February 2016	
Early the next morning, Manato encourages Shihoru to feed the doves. He catches her after she loses her balance when a dove gets too close to her. Team Manato returns to Damuro to hunt three more goblins, using new skills they have learned in their respective guild training sessions. As Team Manato stops to take a break, Manato mentions how well they fight as a team. As they resume their hunt, they encounter goblins much too powerful for them to defeat. In the process of retreating, Manato takes an arrow to the back by a goblin and soon collapses, having exhausted his healing powers earlier. The rest of the group rushes to Ortana, with Manato in tow, in order to see Hōnen, master of the Priests Guild. Hōnen tells them the devastating news that Manato has died and cannot be brought back to life. He suggests that Manato deserves a proper funeral of cremation. The rest of the group weeps for the loss of their friend as the ashes are carried in the wind.
5	"Crying Doesn't Mean You're Weak. Enduring Doesn't Mean You're Strong."; Transliteration: "Naku no wa Yowai Kara Janai. Taerareru no wa Tsuyoi Kara Janai" (Japanese: 泣くのは弱いからじゃない。 耐えられるのは強いからじゃない)	Masahiro Shimizu	8 February 2016	
Haruhiro says that the burial cost one silver coin, which is 50 copper coins for the cremation and 50 copper coins for the grave. The group is despondent after Manato's death and funeral. Haruhiro, Ranta, and Moguzo go to Shelly's Tavern, where a carefree man named Kikkawa informs them that the Priest of a group is highly targeted and therefore must be protected. With Kikkawa's help, Haruhiro, now as group leader, recruits Mary as part of Team Haruhiro. As they return to Damuro to fight goblins, the rest of the group realizes that Mary is a sullen, taciturn person who does not cooperate well with them. As the guys return to Shelly's Tavern to come up with possible solutions, a Volunteer Soldier named Renji offers Haruhiro a gold coin, worth 100 silver coins, as a gift for the loss of Manato. However, Haruhiro selflessly declines the offer. At night outside the girls' bathhouse, Yume cries with Haruhiro, saying that they were a real party when Manato was the group leader. After Haruhiro apologizes to Yume for not consulting with the girls first, Haruhiro and Yume cuddle, but Shihoru has a slightly different perspective from the bathhouse window.
6	"Her Circumstances"; Transliteration: "Kanojo no Baai" (Japanese: 彼女の場合)	Yuki Kinoshita; Tatsuya Oka	15 February 2016	
Shihoru apologizes for assuming that Haruhiro and Yume were in a relationship, which brings up unnecessary jealousy in Ranta. Yume and Shihoru convince Haruhiro, Ranta, and Moguzo to make Mary feel more welcome despite the circumstances. In Damuro, Team Haruhiro efficiently kills three goblins. Mary heals Moguzo's head wound, but she disregards Ranta's arm bruise. Also, Mary rebuffs Haruhiro from attempting to have her open up. At Shelly's Tavern, the rest of the group witnesses Mary talking to Shinohara, leader of Team Orion. At night, Haruhiro has a vision of Manato telling him not to doubt himself as the group leader. The next day in Damuro, Haruhiro realizes that Moguzo needs to buy a helmet, and Mary used her staff to protect Shihoru from an attack. Afterwards, Mary politely declines Haruhiro's request to join the rest of the group for a meal. At night in Shelly's Tavern, Hayashi, a member of Team Orion, explains Mary's cold demeanor. Mary happily healed every minor scrape that her former party had suffered, just like Manato. However, as her party faced a giant kobold in the Cyrene Mine, her magic depleted too soon and three members died.
7	"They Were Called Goblin Slayers"; Transliteration: "Goburin Sureiyā to Yobarete" (Japanese: ゴブリンスレイヤーと呼ばれて)	Minami Seki; Keiichi Kondo	22 February 2016	
Hayashi concludes by saying that he brought Mary out of the Cyrene Mine alive. As Hayashi stayed with Team Orion, Mary had troubled staying with a party due to her traumatic past. Having learned of what Mary has gone through, Haruhiro and Shihoru believe that the group should continue working on befriending Mary, although Ranta is unsure if it is still possible. The next day during a downpour, Haruhiro and Yume fail to sneak up on a goblin, after they almost blow their cover in the bushes. Soon after, Haruhiro tells Mary about Manato, who served as the group's healer, offense, and leader. Haruhiro explains that it is hard for his party of "leftovers" to survive without a Priest. He and the rest of the group welcome her as their friend. Team Haruhiro slays goblins day after day in Damuro, and Mary slowly starts to interact more with the others. The group also learns new skills against the goblins. At night, Haruhiro has a vision of Manato, and is proud of the way that the group has improved. Haruhiro stops counting the number of days in Grimgar while looking into the sky at a red full moon.
8	"In My Memories with You"; Transliteration: "Kimi to no Omoide ni" (Japanese: 君との思い出に)	Yuko Sotake; Miki Takemoto	29 February 2016	
Team Haruhiro resolves to not let any more friends die, before continuing the hunt for more goblins. Having improved on their skills, the party decides to hunt the group of goblins who killed Manato. In the abandoned building, Team Haruhiro has a tough battle against their clever opponents, each of them using their skills to kill the goblins. Haruhiro finds and kills the remaining goblin that previously stole his dagger and shot Mary with a bow and arrow, which brings up haunting memories about Manato. After the party succeeds, they are able to earn enough money to buy their Volunteer Soldier badges. Shihoru tearfully leaves a badge for the fallen Manato at his grave. As it begins to snow, Haruhiro and Mary walk together as he mentions that there are wounds that not even the strongest magic can heal, since she is grieving for the three members of her former party. Mary parts ways from Haruhiro after being satisfied with talking to him about it.
9	"How to Rest"; Transliteration: "Kyūka no Sugoshikata" (Japanese: 休暇の過ごし方)	Eisuke Matsubara; Takushi Ueno	7 March 2016	
Team Haruhiro takes a day off for some rest and relaxation. Haruhiro and Moguzo have bread for breakfast as they discuss how they and the others will spend their day off. Shihoru feeds the doves at the bridge and shows appreciation to Haruhiro for working together as they watch the sunrise. Haruhiro later has tea with Mary on a balcony of a women's apartment complex. Meanwhile, Ranta goes fishing while witnessing Yume rock climbing from a distance. At night in Shelly's Tavern, Kikkawa informs Haruhiro that there has been an increase in goblin population at Damuro. Haruhiro suggests to his group that they should change their hunting grounds to the Cyrene Mine, but they must avoid the savage kobold named Death Spots. A overwhelmed Mary excuses herself outside, and after Haruhiro catches up to her, she explains that her friends had died in that very place. Despite their misgivings and Mary's obvious emotional baggage, they are determined to try it. During a training session with Barbara, Haruhiro asks her about the streaks of light that he has often seen while fighting, which seem to show him how and where to strike.
10	"I'm Not Fit to Be a Leader"; Transliteration: "Rīdā no Utsuwa Janai Keredo" (Japanese: リーダーの器じゃないけれど)	Masahiro Shimizu	14 March 2016	
Team Haruhiro reaches the Cyrene Mine, where the group defeats three lesser kobolds and claims talismans hung from the noses of the lesser kobolds. As Team Haruhiro works their way deeper into the caves, they defeat two normal kobolds, claiming more talismans. At night in his bedroom, Haruhiro has doubts about being fit to be a leader, since Ranta has been acting rash towards the rest of the group. When Haruhiro questions Ranta for his actions in the Cyrene Mine, Ranta responds with mentioning how he defeated an opponent on his own. Haruhiro says that Ranta is easily misunderstood during battle, but Ranta calls out Haruhiro for his weaknesses. The next day, Team Haruhiro returns to the Cyrene Mine, where they defeat a normal kobold and an elder kobold. When Team Haruhiro reaches the farm land, Death Spots is spotted nearby. However, Ranta accidentally triggers a tripwire cowbell alarm. Mary starts to hyperventilate upon the sight of Death Spots.
11	"Between Life and Death"; Transliteration: "Seitoshi no ma de" (Japanese: 生と死の間で)	Kunihiko Sakurai	21 March 2016	
Mary has a dream of reuniting with her friends Michiki, Og, and Mutsumi. As Haruhiro wakes up Mary, she leads Team Haruhiro away to safety, since they would be at a disadvantage in the farm land as an open field. Team Haruhiro stops for a rest in the ruins of a temple, where Mary had her traumatic experience in the past. The party's rest is interrupted by three undead, the reanimated corpses of Michiki, Og, and Mutsumi, all of whose bodies were not cremated after death. The rest of the group manages to fend off the three undead long enough for Mary to purify them each. Haruhiro discusses with his group about what they should work on as warriors. Their relief is short-lived as Death Spots suddenly appears, forcing them to flee. Team Haruhiro is chased through the caverns and narrowly manages to escape through a well, although Ranta is cut off and left behind to face Death Spots by himself.
12	"See You Tomorrow..."; Transliteration: "Mata, Ashita..." (Japanese: また、明日――)	Mieko Hosoi	28 March 2016	
Ranta manages to escape from Death Spots through the well and eventually reunites with the others in the farm land. Team Haruhiro attempts to flee, only for Death Spots to block their path. After fending off Death Spots in the farm land, they seek rest in the caves. However, Death Spots finds them shortly after. Haruhiro decides to use his scarf to strangle Death Spots into a pit, giving the others a chance to retreat. As he faces Death Spots, Haruhiro accepts his death but is determined to fight until that moment. Haruhiro suddenly sees the streaks of light and proceeds to fight. He defeats Death Spots before losing consciousness. He wakes up fully healed at home, thanks to the others returning for him. The others are overjoyed that Haruhiro is awake, as they now have to decide what they will do with the bounty of thirty gold coins that they have earned for killing Death Spots. At Shelly's Tavern, Renji apologizes to Haruhiro for his actions in response for Manato's death. Haruhiro later visits Manato's grave, where the vision of Manato believes that Haruhiro has grown as a leader. Haruhiro embraces his new memories with his friends in Grimgar.
