= Fairy Gone =

Japanese anime television series

- Key visual

Fairy gone(フェアリーゴーン)
- Genre: Action; Dark fantasy
- Created by: Five Fairy Scholars
- Anime television series
- Directed by: Kenichi Suzuki
- Written by: Ao Jūmonji
- Music by: Makoto Miyazaki (Know Name); Shūhei Mutsuki (Know Name)
- Studio: P.A. Works
- Licensed by: NA: Crunchyroll; SEA: Medialink
- Original network: Tokyo MX, BS11, MBS, AT-X
- Original run: April 7, 2019 – December 22, 2019
- Episodes: 24
- Manga
- Written by: Ryōsuke Fuji
- Published by: Kodansha
- Magazine: Bessatsu Shōnen Magazine
- Original run: April 9, 2019 – December 9, 2019
- Volumes: 2
- icon

Fairy Gone (Note: Japanese: Fairy gone(フェアリーゴーン)) is a Japanese anime television series produced by P.A. Works that aired from April to December 2019.

== Plot ==
In the aftermath of the War of Unification, all the nations of the continent of Eastald are forcefully united under a single ruler. During the war, special soldiers were implanted with Fairy organs, allowing them to summon powerful Fairies to fight under their command. These soldiers were dubbed "Fairy Soldiers" and used by all sides. However, nine years after the end of the war, conflict still remains as rogue Fairy Soldiers and criminals take advantage of the postwar instability. To combat this threat, the government agency "Dorothea" is formed, whose sole purpose is to combat illegal Fairy users.

One of Dorothea's newest recruits, Marlya, teams up with veteran Fairy Soldier and Dorothea operative Free in hopes of tracking down her long-lost childhood friend Veronica, who is now an illegal Fairy Soldier working for an unknown organization looking to recover an artifact dubbed the "Black Fairy Tome".

== Characters ==
=== Dorothea ===
First Unit of Illegal Fairy Regulatory Agency Dorothea. A branch of the Ministry of Fairies of Zesskia, their job is to handle illegal fairy usage. They regularly enter combat against illegal Fairy Soldiers and their allies and many members are Fairy Soldiers.

Marlya Noel (マーリヤ・ノエル, Māriya Noeru)
Voiced by: Kana Ichinose (Japanese); Jill Harris (English)
A survivor from Ray Dawn's massacre of Suna village, she was called "a little disaster" as both her parents died the day she was born and the person who raised her afterwards also died. She was close friends with Veronica Thorn however, who she has not seen since the Suna massacre, which only she and Veronica survived. Like others from Suna, Marlya possesses the ability to see fairy primordials without the aid of special equipment, which humans aren't supposed to be able to do. She carries a hunting rifle and joined the Biaklay Mafia family to gain more resources and find Veronica. During a black market auction, she was directly possessed by the fairy Ash Cloud, who became her fairy and she began working with Dorothea, usually with Free Underbar.
Free Underbar (フリー・アンダーバー, Furī Andābā)
Voiced by: Tomoaki Maeno (Japanese); Ian Sinclair (English)
A soldier from the Unification War, a fairy organ was transplanted into his body, making him a fairy soldier with the fearsome, wolf-like Red Hood as his fairy. He fights with two longswords and fought alongside Wolfran Row, a fellow Fairy Soldier, until the end of the Unification War, after which he joined Dorothea. He worked undercover as a member of the Gui Carlin mafia for a year until he met Marlya Noel and events then blew his cover with the mafia. He is a regular partner of Marlya since she joined Dorothea. He owns the fairy weapon Verosteal, but is not one of the Seven Knights as it was merely entrusted to him.
Klara Kisenaria (クラーラ・キセナリア, Kurāra Kisenaria)
Voiced by: Ayaka Suwa (Japanese); Apphia Yu (English)
Klara is a sensible and serious Dorothea agent with long brown hair left unbound, bright blue eyes, and black-rimmed glasses. In the past she was saved by Nein Auler, leading her to voluntarily receive a fairy organ transplant and join Dorothea. Her fairy, Tomereez is too weak to be used in combat but can link her senses to it and use it for infiltration and surveillance, its small size making it difficult for others to spot. She has also acted as a spotter for Serge Tovah's sniping.
Serge Tovah (セルジュ・トーヴァ, Seruju Tōva)
Voiced by: Yoshiki Nakajima (Japanese); Micah Solusod (English)
An easy-going talkative Dorothea member with messy blonde hair who likes to flirt with Klara Kisenaria. His fairy, Blind Tail, is a cross between a snake and centipede. It wraps around his body and shoots energy blasts from his tail, letting him snipe with great accuracy and power.
Lily Heineman (リリー・ハイネマン, Rirī Haineman)
Voiced by: Atsumi Tanezaki (Japanese); Leah Clark (English)
The captain of Dorothea's third unit. She is not a fairy soldier but is a capable leader trusted by her subordinates. She wears her light brown hair in a high ponytail.
Robert Chase (ロバート・チェイス, Robāto Cheisu)
Voiced by: Kōji Okino (Japanese); Oscar Seung (English)
A former military soldier and a member of the Security Bureau who transferred into Dorothea after the war. He is mainly in charge of interrogation and investigation.
Oz Mare (オズ・メア, Ozu Mea)
Voiced by: Yasuhiro Mamiya (Japanese); Cris George (English)
A tall, wide-shouldered, bald man partnered with a bull-like fairy. He is killed by Beevee Liscar when, on the orders of Duke Diese, Liscar's group raids a train which was transporting a fairy weapon.
Elenoa Need (エレノア・ニード, Erenoa Nīdo)
Voiced by: Mikako Komatsu (Japanese); Gloria Vivica Benavides (English)
A doctor and fairy engineer with long blonde hair from Redrad in Dorothea's medical technology department. She is not a combatant but provides medical services for her colleagues.
Nein Auler (ネイン・アウラー, Nein Aurā)
Voiced by: Mie Sonozaki (Japanese); Colleen Clinkenbeard (English)
The strict director of Dorothea. She is one of the "Seven Knights" and holds the fairy weapon Aliadra, a chainsword. She was known as the Witch of Ainedern because of her prowess in battle.
Chima (チマ, Chima)
Voiced by: Aoi Koga (Japanese); Bryn Apprill (English)
Chima is a member of the rare Czeschka maticarna species that can smell and locate fairies without the aid of special equipment. It looks like a tiny blue and white fox-like creature. Originally for sale in a Gui Carlin black market, it escaped in the chaos and became attached to Marlya, remaining with her.

=== The Unified Zesskia Empire's Government ===
Zesskia, the empire that now controls all nations within the continent of Eastald, ruled by Emperor Harol but his power is split between him, a Prime Minister, and five Dukes. Recently however, three of the five Dukes have been executed for treason against the emperor. Its capital city is Rondacia and its flag is a red crescent moon inside a golden sun whose top half is blue, bottom half is red, and has a thin white stripe down the middle.

Castal Harol (キャスタル・ハロル, Kyasutaru Haroru)
Voiced by: Yasuhiro Kikuchi (Japanese); Barry Yandell (English)
The Emperor of Unified Zesskia, he's a slim, plain-looking man with short brown hair, a mustache, and a goatee. He began the Unification War to increase his territory and won. After Duke Diese saved Prime Minister Helwise at the anniversary celebration, he agrees to give him one of the seven fairy weapons.
Golbarn Helwise (ゴルバーン・ヘルワイズ, Gorubān Heruwaizu)
Voiced by: Shōto Kashii (Japanese); Bruce DuBose (English)
During the Unification War, he allied with the current emperor, surrendering his crown as the King of Cidal to him. After the war, he became the emperor's Prime Minister. While some consider him a hero who helped end the war, others see him as a murderer who killed everyone who didn't agree with him, even helping force the other countries to surrender to Zesskia's rule during the Unification War.
Marco Bellwood (マルコ・ベルウッド, Maruko Berūddo)
Voiced by: Hōchū Ōtsuka (Japanese); Jim White (English)
The Vice-Minister in charge of the Ministry of Fairies and Nein Auraa's superior, he's a descendant of the first fairy scholar.
Griff Mercer (グリフ・マーサー, Gurifu Māsā)
Voiced by: Kenjiro Tsuda (Japanese); Christopher Wehkamp (English)
He has short blonde hair and blue eyes and serves as Marco Bellwood's second-in-command.
Ray Dawn (レイ・ドーン, Rei Dōn)
Voiced by: Eizo Tsuda (Japanese); Kent Williams (English)
One of the "Seven Knights" during the Unification War, he possesses Sororias, one of seven fairy weapons, and was granted the title of Duke of Kal-o territory by the Emperor. He is currently the only remaining Duke, the others having been sentenced to death for treason. Despite being from Suna, he led a small army to burn his home to the ground and exterminate every villager years ago as he deemed that while the fairies have no will they were too powerful and too dangerous to let live, as were the villagers who could see fairy primordials without the aid of special equipment. The only survivors of this genocide being, Marlya and her best friend, Veronica.
Schwartz Diese (シュヴァルツ・ディーゼ, Shuvarutsu Dīze)
Voiced by: Takaya Hashi (Japanese); R. Bruce Elliot (English)
He was granted the title Duke of Hybranz territory following the Unification War by the Emperor and controlled a large territory. He and Ray Dawn are the only two out of the original five Dukes who haven't been executed. While he seems to support the Emperor in public, it was for the purpose of gaining a fairy weapon. He then attempted to assassinate the Emperor and take over but was killed by Ray Dawn.
Ewan Breeze (ユアン・ブリーズ, Yuan Burīzu)
Voiced by: Kenji Nomura (Japanese); Robert McCollum (English)
An ally of the emperor in the Unification War, he was one of the "Seven Knights" and became one of the Five Dukes of the empire after the war, ruling over the Nova territory. He was suspected of plotting a rebellion, which enraged him so much he actually started one. He died in the fighting. His Fairy, Norca, was said to be the largest fairy of all Fairy Soldiers' and could swallow enemies with its giant jaw.

=== Gui Carlin Mafia ===
A mafia group that specializes in buying and selling illegal antiques and valuables. They have two-thirds of the Black Fairy Tome, volumes Black Three and Black Six and seek the remaining Black Nine.

Patricia Pearl (パトリシア・パール, Patorishia Pāru)
Voiced by: Yuka Iguchi (Japanese); Alexis Tipton (English)
Also called Patty, Patricia was an assassin of the Gui Carlin mafia who works with Jonathan Passpierre. She carries a heavy trunk full of various weapons at all times, and can double as a melee weapon on its own, and has a fairy named Boneless, which looks like a pile of jelly. She dislikes adding flavors to food and only drinks fresh water. She and Jonathan were contacted by Sweetie to kill Marlya and Free. The mission failed but Patricia escaped.
Jonathan Passepierre (ジョナサン・パスピエール, Jonasan Pasupiēru)
Voiced by: Kazuyuki Okitsu (Japanese); Jerry Jewell (English)
Jonathan was an assassin of the Gui Carlin mafia and partner of Patricia Pearl. He's a sadist and self-proclaimed artist who uses knives and had an impeccable aim while throwing them. The knives were also coated in a special poison that prevented fairy soldiers from summoning their fairies. It even worked on those like Marlya who're directly possessed. He and Patricia were hired by Sweetie to kill Marlya and Free. While he was able to separate Marlya from Free, he failed to kill Marlya after Veronica intervened, and was then overpowered and killed by them. His fairy was Jenny Haniver.
E.J. Davin Thor (イージェイ・ダーヴェン・ソー)
Voiced by: Hiroki Yasumoto (Japanese); David Wald (English)
One of Gui Carlin's four top executives, the Eyes. He stole the fairy weapon, Morterant, during the Unification War and has a bat-like fairy, which can link senses with him and enables him to see his opponents movements in slow motion, leading to him closing his eyes whist fights.

=== Arcame Mafia ===
A mafia group that buys and sells illegal Fairies as well as manufactures artificial Fairies.

Wolfran Row (ウルフラン・ロウ, Urufuran Rō)
Voiced by: Yoshimasa Hosoya (Japanese); David Matranga (English)
A former Fairy Soldier during the Unification War, he fought alongside Free Underbar. After his wife and young daughter were killed in the war, he left the military and became a terrorist, working alongside the Arcame Mafia. His fairy's name is Fitcher.
Axel Laboo (アクセル・ラブ―, Akuseru Rabū)
Voiced by: Shinji Kawada (Japanese); Kyle Igneczi (English)
An Arcame Mafia member and one of Free's contacts, he is something of a sleaze but provides Free with information multiple times throughout the series.

=== Albastora ===
Led by a descendant of Crucia Albastora, the original author of the Black Fairy Tome, they seek the Black Fairy Tome to destroy it for an unknown reason.

Damian Carme (ダミアン・カルメ, Damian Karume)
Voiced by: Takehito Koyasu (Japanese); John Burgmeier (English)
A fairy scholar who posed as an assistant of Cain Distarol. He's actually working with Veronica Thorn as members of an unknown faction to collect the pages of the Black Fairy Tome. While he's changed his surname, he is actually a descendant of Crucia Albastora, the original author of the Black Fairy Tome.
Veronica Thorn (ヴェロニカ・ソーン, Veronika Sōn)
Voiced by: Ayaka Fukuhara (Japanese); Emily Neves (English)
A childhood friend of Marlya Noel, who called her Ver, she and Marlya were the only ones to survive the Suna massacre led by Ray Dawn, who she has sworn revenge against. Like others from Suna, Veronica possesses the ability to see fairy primordials without the aid of special equipment, which humans aren't supposed to be able to do. Directly possessed by her fairy, Blood Daughter, she works as an assassin for Albastora, seeking to destroy the Black Fairy Tome. She is also obsessed with killing Duke Ray Dawn in revenge for Suna's destruction, even if she dies in the process.

=== Other ===
Bitter Sweet ("スウィーティー" ビター・スウィート, "Suwītī" Bitā Suwīto)
Voiced by: Minako Kotobuki (Japanese); Morgan Garrett (English)
Bitter Sweet, often called Sweetie, is a smooth-talking businesswoman with a perfect memory. As pleasant as she is merciless, she is fearsome with a sword and gun and often works against Dorothea, once sending assassins after them. However, she will "work" with anyone if their goals happen to align, having helped Dorothea, Albastora, and Gui Carlin at different times. She seeks the Black Fairy Tome and has a fairy named Skriker.
Cain Distarol (カイン・ディスタロル, Kain Disutaroru)
Voiced by: Mugihito (Japanese); Ben Bryant (English)
A fairy scholar who was a friend of Damien Carme's father. He tries to collect the pages of the Black Fairy Tome and seems unaware of Damien's ulterior motives.
Beevee Liscar (ビーヴィー・リスカー, Bīvī Risukā)
Voiced by: Hisao Egawa (Japanese); Bryan Massey (English)
One of the "Seven Knights," he was a legendary fairy soldier who kept fighting until the end. After the war he became an Agent of war and leader of a band of mercenaries. Under Duke Diese's orders, he robbed a train and stole the fairy weapon Fratanil. He has a three-headed wolf fairy named Eizenkopf and the fairy weapon Gaddfacs - the one in lockup is fake.
Sophie (ソフィー, Sofī)
Voiced by: Shizuka Itō (Japanese); Mikaela Krantz (English)
She is a subordinate of Beevee Liscar with short blonde hair and blue eyes. While capable in close knife combat, her specialty was sniping.
Jet Glaive (ジェット・グレイヴ, Jetto Gureibu)
Voiced by: Hiroki Tōchi (Japanese); Clifford Chapin (English)
Jet Glaive was a fairy soldier and one of the Seven Knights who fought alongside Free and Wolfram during the Unification War. He was a friend of Free's and saved him from being killed by an enemy Fairy Soldier, though the blow he took for Free led to him bleeding to death shortly afterwards. Free was then entrusted with Jet's fairy weapon, Verosteal.

== Production and release ==
The original anime television series by P.A. Works was announced on January 24, 2019. It was directed by Kenichi Suzuki and written by Ao Jūmonji, with Haruhisa Nakata and Takako Shimizu handling character designs. Japanese musician Know-Name (stylized as [K]NoW_NAME) composed the music and performed the series' opening theme song "Knock On the Core", as well as the second opening theme song "Still Standing". The series aired as a split-cour, with the first half airing on Tokyo MX, BS11, MBS, and AT-X from April 7 to June 23, 2019, while the second half aired from October 6 to December 22, 2019. Funimation licensed the series; the English dub premiered on April 28, 2019.
