= To the Abandoned Sacred Beasts =

Japanese manga series

- First tankōbon volume cover, featuring Nancy Schaal Bancroft

かつて神だった獣たちへ (Katsute Kami Datta Kemono-tachi e)
- Genre: Action; Dark fantasy
- Manga
- Written by: Maybe
- Published by: Kodansha
- English publisher: NA: Vertical
- Magazine: Bessatsu Shōnen Magazine
- Original run: 9 June 2014 – 9 June 2023
- Volumes: 15
- Anime television series
- Directed by: Jun Shishido
- Written by: Shigeru Murakoshi
- Music by: Yoshihiro Ike
- Studio: MAPPA
- Licensed by: Crunchyroll
- Original network: Tokyo MX, BS11, MBS
- English network: SEA: Animax Asia
- Original run: 1 July 2019 – 16 September 2019
- Episodes: 12
- icon

To the Abandoned Sacred Beasts (Japanese: かつて神だった獣たちへ, Hepburn: Katsute Kami Datta Kemono-tachi e; lit. 'To the Beasts That Were Once Gods') is a Japanese manga series written and illustrated by Maybe. It was serialized in Kodansha's shōnen manga magazine Bessatsu Shōnen Magazine from June 2014 to June 2023, with its chapters collected in fifteen tankōbon volumes. The manga is licensed for English release in North America by Vertical. A 12-episode anime television series adaptation by MAPPA was broadcast from July to September 2019.

== Plot ==
100 years after settlers on the continent of Patria established a democratic nation, The nation of Patria split between the industrial Northern Union and the mining towns of the Southern Confederation began fighting the war. While the South had greater numbers, the North had a secret weapon: The Incarnates, soldiers who could transform into giant mythical beasts and single-handedly destroy enemy emplacements. However, when the war ended and a peace treaty was negotiated, the Incarnates were supposed to be destroyed. With the war over, a forward Incarnate troop captain named Hank has made it his mission to hunt down the surviving Incarnates, assisted by a young woman named Nancy who blames him for killing her father.

== Characters ==
=== Main ===
Hank Henriette (ハンク・ヘンリエット, Hanku Henrietto)
Voiced by: Katsuyuki Konishi (Japanese); Ray Chase (English)
Former Captain of the Incarnates Force. He was once a friend of Elaine and Cain, and was once liked by Elaine. He once led the troops to victory for the Northern Army. Two months after the end of the war, he became a Beast Hunter, hunting down all the Incarnates whose lost their humanity throughout Patria to prevent them from causing more destruction. He is capable of transforming into a werewolf under moonlight, and fights with a giant spear.
Nancy Schaal Bancroft (ナンシー・シャール・バンクロフト, Nanshī Shāru Bankurofuto)
Voiced by: Ai Kakuma (Japanese); Erika Harlacher (English)
Daughter of John William Bancroft, The elephant gun in her hand is her father's legacy. At first, Nancy did not understand why Hank killed her father, but decided to follow him in order to find out the truth about the Incarnates and what caused them to lose their humanity.
Cain Madhouse (ケイン・マッドハウス, Kein Maddohausu)
Voiced by: Yuichi Nakamura (Japanese); Mick Wingert (English)
Formerly a nobleman named Cain Withers, he was Vice Captain of the Incarnates. He was once a friend of Hank and Elaine, and once liked Elaine. He released all the Incarnates near the end of the war, and has a different opinion from Hank and others on why the Incarnates lost their humanity. He is called the vampire Incarnate, the immortal king of blood and the night.
Elaine Bluelake (エレイン・ブルーレーク, Erein Burūrēku)
Voiced by: Mamiko Noto (Japanese); Allegra Clark (English)
A doctor who created the Incarnates. She was once a friend of Hank and Cain, and once liked Hank. At that time, she created the Incarnates in order to end the war as soon as possible, but she felt responsible for the fate that all the Incarnates faced after the war.
Claude Withers (クロード・ウィザース, Kurōdo Wizāsu)
Voiced by: Kaito Ishikawa (Japanese); Billy Kametz (English)
A human and the Captain of Coup de Grace, an Incarnate Extermination Squad authorized by the government. He takes his job seriously and swears he will not smile until he has killed all the Incarnates. Unknown to most people, he is Cain's half younger brother. In order to find out the reason for his elder brother Cain's rebellion, he decided to hunt down all the Incarnates who have lost their humanity.
Liza Runecastle (ライザ・ルネキャッスル, Raiza Runekyassuru)
Voiced by: Yōko Hikasa (Japanese); Cherami Leigh (English)
A spy from the Northern Union who feeds information to Hank about the Incarnates. She feels a sense of responsibility to look after Schaal and Claude, and is also concerned about Hank's alone actions .
Miglieglia Cochlea (ミリエリア・ココレア, Mirieria Kokorea)
Voiced by: Kana Ichinose (Japanese); Carrie Keranen (English)
A young white-haired girl with gold eyes and a black dress who stay with Cain. She is an Incarnate that appeared after the war. She has the ability to control the dead. Her true identity is Elaine's posthumous daughter.

=== Incarnate Soldiers ===
John William Bancroft (Nidhogg) (ウィリアム(ニーズヘッグ))
Voiced by: Daisuke Hirakawa (Japanese); Todd Haberkorn (English)
Schaal's father, who ran a local orphanage with his daughter. Even after the war, he returned to his Incarnate form and continued to take care of the children, but he began screaming in the middle of the night, scaring the local villagers and even hunting the village's livestock, causing Schaal to have to send the orphans to a safe place, so he voluntarily let Hank kill him for the sake of his daughter and all the villagers.
Edgar Beckford (Basilisk) ((エドガー ・ベックフォード (バジリスク))
Voiced by: Hiroki Yasumoto (Japanese); Aaron LaPlante (English)
A former Incarnate soldier who used his power to rob people's house after the war is over, as well as killing people who lives there, he was the first Incarnate to be killed by Hank after took an oath.
Daniel Price (Spriggan) (ダニエル(スプリガン))
Voiced by: Shinnosuke Tachibana (Japanese); Mick Wingert (English)
A relatively easygoing young man. He attempted to return to a normal life in his hometown of Barn Wood, but in fact, he was robbing nearby caravans to provide for his family.
Theodore Sherman (Minotaur) (セオドア (ミノタウロス))
Voiced by: Kōki Uchiyama (Japanese); Kyle McCarley (English)
A cowardly young man who joined the Northern Army before he was inspired by Hank. After returning home to Rogue Hill, he grew increasingly paranoid and turned the town into his personal labyrinthine fortress to defend himself from all perceived threats.
Arthur Allston (Behemoth) (アーサー (ベヒモス))
Voiced by: Kenjiro Tsuda
A soft-spoken soldier who rarely talked about himself and followed orders without question. As the Behemoth, he wanders East for reasons unknown, while trying to avoid heavily-populated areas.
Christopher Keynes (Gargoyle) (クリストファー・ケインズ (ガーゴイル))
Voiced by: Jun Fukuyama (Japanese); Xander Mobus (English)
A young man who often found solace in the teachings of the Church before joining the Army. in Gargoyle form, he metes out his own version of justice to the "sinners" of White Church.
Elizabeth Weezer (Arachne) (エリザベス)
Voiced by: Maaya Sakamoto (Japanese); Erica Lindbeck (English)
A female Incarnate who stands with Cain after the war. She is very concerned about the hatred and conflict between Cain and Hank. She possesses spider-like abilities, being able to produce large amounts of silk to block and restrain the enemy's movements.
Beatrice Serrault (Siren) (ベアトリス・セロー (セイレーン))
Voiced by: Saori Hayami (Japanese); Tara Sands (English)
A former lounge singer. She decided to become an Incarnate to end the war as soon as possible so people could enjoy her songs again. Her ability puts people to sleep making them incapable of resisting. She is one of the few Incarnates who tried to avoid hurting humans after the war.
Rex Brock (Garmr) (ロイ (ガルム))
Voiced by: Tatsuhisa Suzuki (Japanese); Ben Diskin (English)
Commonly known as "Roy", he was formerly a field soldier for Northern Union of Patria on the front lines of the War where his platoon was wiped out with him as the only survivor. Sometime later, he met up with Cain and Hank where he became close friends with Hank as a fellow wolf Incarnate.
Miles Byron (Centaur) (マイルズ ・バイロン (ケンタウロス))
Voiced by: Tomokazu Sugita (Japanese); Keith Silverstein (English)
A former military doctor who treated soldiers on the battlefield; however, he realized that many of the soldiers he treated died again. This experience led him to transform into an Incarnate to prevent that more soldiers continue to die.

== Media ==
=== Manga ===
Written and illustrated by the duo Maybe, To the Abandoned Sacred Beasts was serialized in Kodansha's shōnen manga magazine Bessatsu Shōnen Magazine from 9 June 2014 to 9 June 2023. Kodansha collected its chapters in fifteen tankōbon volumes, released from 9 December 2014 to 8 August 2023.

North American manga publisher Vertical announced their license to the series in August 2015. The fifteen volumes were published from 17 May 2016 to 14 May 2024.

==== Volumes ====
No.	Original release date	Original ISBN	English release date	English ISBN
1	9 December 2014	978-4-06-395262-9	17 May 2016	978-1-942993-41-4
1. "Beast Hunter" (獣狩り, Kemono Gari); 2. "The Minotaur's Fortress (Pt. 1)" (ミノタウロスの要塞 ①, Minotaurosu no Yōsai Ichi); 3. "The Minotaur's Fortress (Pt. 2)" (ミノタウロスの要塞 ②, Minotaurosu no Yōsai Ni); 4. "March of the Behemoth (Pt. 1)" (巨獣(ベヒモス)の猛進 ①, Behimosu no Mōshin Ichi); 5. "March of the Behemoth (Pt. 2)" (巨獣(ベヒモス)の猛進 ②, Behimosu no Mōshin Ni)
2	9 June 2015	978-4-06-395410-4	16 August 2016	978-1-942993-42-1
6. "Beasts Unbound" (解き放たれた獣, Tokihanata Reta Kemono); 7. "Gargoyle's Judgement (Pt. 1)" (ガーゴイルの断罪 ①, Gāgoiru no Danzai Ichi); 8. "Gargoyle's Judgement (Pt. 2)" (ガーゴイルの断罪 ②, Gāgoiru no Danzai Ni); 9. "Gargoyle's Judgement (Pt. 3)" (ガーゴイルの断罪 ③, Gāgoiru no Danzai San); 10. "Lord of the Beasts" (獣の王, Kemono no Ō)
3	9 December 2015	978-4-06-395552-1	22 November 2016	978-1-942993-64-3
11. "The Dragon's Daughter" (竜の娘, Ryū no Musume); 12. "Coup de Grace" (クーデグラース, Kū de Gurāsu); 13. "Returning to the Road" (旅の再開, Tabi no Saikai); 14. "Songstress of Sleep (Pt. 1)" (眠りの歌姫 ①, Nemuri no Utahime Ichi); 15. "Songstress of Sleep (Pt. 2)" (眠りの歌姫 ②, Nemuri no Utahime Ni); 16. Target (標的, Hyōteki)
4	9 August 2016	978-4-06-395682-5	14 February 2017	978-1-945054-03-7
17. "The Night of the Hunt" (狩りの夜, Kari no Yoru); 18. "The Hound of Hell's Gate (Pt. 1)" (冥府の番犬 ①, Meifu no Banken Ichi); 19. "The Hound of Hell's Gate (Pt. 2)" (冥府の番犬 ②, Meifu no Banken Ni); 20. "Reunion (Pt. 1)" (再会 ①, Saikai Ichi); 21. "Reunion (Pt. 2)" (再会 ②, Saikai Ni); 22. "Reunion (Pt. 3)" (再会 ③, Saikai San)
5	9 February 2017	978-4-06-395836-2	28 November 2017	978-1-945054-20-4
23. "The Beacon of Rebellion" (反乱の狼煙, Hanran no Noroshi); 24. "Immortal Beast (Pt. 1)" (不死身の獣 ①, Fujimi no Kemono Ichi); 25. "Immortal Beast (Pt. 2)" (不死身の獣 ②, Fujimi no Kemono Ni); 26. "Immortal Beast (Pt. 3)" (不死身の獣 ③, Fujimi no Kemono San); 27. "Immortal Beast (Pt. 4)" (不死身の獣 ④, Fujimi no Kemono Yon); 28. "Immortal Beast (Pt. 5)" (不死身の獣 ⑤, Fujimi no Kemono Go)
6	8 September 2017	978-4-06-510201-5	19 June 2018	978-1-947194-05-2
29. "Fortress of the Dead (Pt. 1)" (死者の要塞 ①, Shisha no Yōsai Ichi); 30. "Fortress of the Dead (Pt. 2)" (死者の要塞 ②, Shisha no Yōsai Ni); 31. "A Moment's Peace" (空隙の寂静, Kūgeki no Jakujō); 32. "Replicator of Oblivion (Pt. 1)" (亡失の複製者 ①, Bōshitsu no Fukuseisha Ichi); 33. "Replicator of Oblivion (Pt. 2)" (亡失の複製者 ②, Bōshitsu no Fukuseisha Ni)
7	9 March 2018	978-4-06-511070-6	24 December 2018	978-1-947194-53-3
34. "École (Pt. 1)" (エコール ①, Ekōru Ichi); 35. "École (Pt. 2)" (エコール ②, Ekōru Ni); 36. "École (Pt. 3)" (エコール ③, Ekōru San); 37. "The Voice of God" (神の声, Kami no Koe); Side Story: "The Winds of Hrcesvelgr" (フレスヴェルグの風, Furēsuvu erugu no Kaze)
8	9 August 2018	978-4-06-512324-9	25 June 2019	978-1-947194-62-5
38. "Memories of the Beginning (Pt. 1)" (はじまりの記憶 ①, Hajimari no Kioku Ichi); 39. "Memories of the Beginning (Pt. 2)" (はじまりの記憶 ②, Hajimari no Kioku Ni); 40. "Memories of the Beginning (Pt. 3)" (はじまりの記憶 ③, Hajimari no Kioku San); 41. "Memories of the Beginning (Pt. 4)" (はじまりの記憶 ④, Hajimari no Kioku Yon); 42. "Memories of the Beginning (Pt. 5)" (はじまりの記憶 ⑤, Hajimari no Kioku Go)
9	8 February 2019	978-4-06-514422-0	27 August 2019	978-1-947194-94-6
43. "Memories of the Beginning (Pt. 6)" (はじまりの記憶 ⑥, Hajimari no Kioku Roku); 44. "Memories of the Beginning (Pt. 7)" (はじまりの記憶 ⑦, Hajimari no Kioku Nana); 45. "Memories of the Beginning (Pt. 8)" (はじまりの記憶 ⑧, Hajimari no Kioku Hachi); 46. "Memories of the Beginning (Pt. 9)" (はじまりの記憶 ⑨, Hajimari no Kioku Kyū); 47. "Memories of the Beginning (Pt. 10)" (はじまりの記憶 ⑩, Hajimari no Kioku Jū)
10	9 July 2019	978-4-06-516284-2	28 April 2020	978-1-949980-18-9
48. "The Griffin's Gold (Pt. 1)" (グリフォンの黄金 ①, Gurifon no Kogane Ichi); 49. "The Griffin's Gold (Pt. 2)" (グリフォンの黄金 ②, Gurifon no Kogane Ni); 50. "The Griffin's Gold (Pt. 3)" (グリフォンの黄金 ③, Gurifon no Kogane San); 51. "The Griffin's Gold (Pt. 4)" (グリフォンの黄金 ④, Gurifon no Kogane Yon); 52. "The Griffin's Gold (Pt. 5)" (グリフォンの黄金 ⑤, Gurifon no Kogane Go)
11	9 July 2020	978-4-06-518780-7	26 January 2021	978-1-949980-47-9
53. "Secret Arrangements (Pt. 1)" (密約 ①, Mitsuyaku Ichi); 54. "Secret Arrangements (Pt. 2)" (密約 ②, Mitsuyaku Ni); 55. "Secret Arrangements (Pt. 3)" (密約 ③, Mitsuyaku San); 56. "The One-Eyed Blacksmith (Pt. 1)" (独眼の鍛冶屋 ①, Dokugan no Kajiya Ichi); 57. "The One-Eyed Blacksmith (Pt. 2)" (独眼の鍛冶屋 ②, Dokugan no Kajiya Ni); 58. "The Usurper of Blood (Pt. 1)" (血の簒奪者 ①, Chi no Sandatsusha Ichi); 59. "The Usurper of Blood (Pt. 2)" (血の簒奪者 ②, Chi no Sandatsusha Ni)
12	9 March 2021	978-4-06-522645-2	26 October 2021	978-1-64729-004-7
60. "The Usurper of Blood (Pt. 3)" (血の簒奪者 ③, Chi no Sandatsusha San); 61. "The Holy Virgin in Captivity (Pt. 1)" (幽囚の聖女 ①, Yūshū no Seijo Ichi); 62. "The Holy Virgin in Captivity (Pt. 2)" (幽囚の聖女 ②, Yūshū no Seijo Ni); 63. "The Holy Virgin in Captivity (Pt. 3)" (幽囚の聖女 ③, Yūshū no Seijo San); 64. "The Ogre's Resentment (Pt. 1)' (オーガの怨讐 ①, Ōga no Onshū Ichi); 65. "The Ogre's Resentment (Pt. 2)" (オーガの怨讐 ②, Ōga no Onshū Ni); 66. "The Ogre's Resentment (Pt. 3)" (オーガの怨讐 ③, Ōga no Onshū San)
13	9 November 2021	978-4-06-525987-0	12 July 2022	978-1-64729-103-7
67. "Parting" (惜別, Sekibetsu); 68. "The Arachne's Threads (Pt. 1)" (アラクネの糸操り ①, Arakune no itoayatsuri Ichi); 69. "The Arachne's Threads (Pt. 2)" (アラクネの糸操り ②, Arakune no itoayatsuri Ni); 70. "Encounter (Pt. 1)" (邂逅 ①, Kaigō Ichi); 71. "Encounter (Pt. 2)" (邂逅 ②, Kaigō Ni); 72. "Encounter (Pt. 3)" (邂逅 ③, Kaigō San); Side Story: "The Incarnate is coming!" (擬神兵が来る！, Kishinpei ga kuru!)
14	7 October 2022	978-4-06-529408-6	4 July 2023	978-1-64729-197-6
73. "Capital Showdown (Pt. 1)" (首都決戦 ①, Shuto kessen Ichi); 74. "Capital Showdown (Pt. 2)" (首都決戦 ②, Shuto kessen Ni); 75. "Capital Showdown (Pt. 3)" (首都決戦 ③, Shuto kessen San); 76. "Capital Showdown (Pt. 4)' (首都決戦 ④, Shuto kessen Yon); 77. "Capital Showdown (Pt. 5)" (首都決戦 ⑤, Shuto kessen Go); 78. "Capital Showdown (Pt. 6)" (首都決戦 ⑥, Shuto kessen Roku); 79. "Capital Showdown (Pt. 7)" (首都決戦 ⑦, Shuto kessen Nana)
15	8 August 2023	978-4-06-532603-9	14 May 2024	978-1-64729-227-0
80. "Capital Showdown (Pt. 8)" (首都決戦 ⑧, Shuto kessen Hachi); 81. "Capital Showdown (Pt. 9)" (首都決戦 ⑨, Shuto kessen Kyū); 82. "Sacrifice (Pt. 1)" (犧牲 ①, Gisei Ichi); 83. "Sacrifice (Pt. 2)" (犧牲 ②, Gisei Ni); 84. "Sacrifice (Pt. 3)" (犧牲 ③, Gisei San); 85. "Howl (Pt. 1)" (咆哮 ①, Hōkō Ichi); 86. "Howl (Pt. 2)" (咆哮 ②, Hōkō Ni); 87. "Final Chapter: To the Abandoned Sacred Beasts" (かつて神だった獣たちへ, Katsute Kami Datta Kemono-tachi e)

=== Anime ===
An anime television series adaptation was announced in February 2019. The series was animated by MAPPA and directed by Jun Shishido. Shigeru Murakoshi oversaw series composition, Daisuke Niinuma designed the characters, and Yoshihiro Ike composed the music. The 12-episode series aired from 1 July to 16 September 2019 on Tokyo MX, BS11, and MBS. The opening theme song is "Sacrifice" (サクリファイス) by Mafumafu, while the ending theme song is "HHOOWWLL" by Gero and Araki.

Crunchyroll streamed the series. Crunchyroll produced an English dub.

==== Episodes ====
No.	Title (Note: All English titles are taken from Crunchyroll.)	Original release date
1	"To the Abandoned Sacred Beasts"; Transliteration: "Katsute Kami Datta Kemono-tachi e" (Japanese: かつて神だった獣たちへ)	1 July 2019
The Northern Union and Southern Confederation of Patria wage war over control of the mysterious ore Somnium. When Southern forces gain advantage, the North develops Incarnates—soldiers who sacrifice their humanity to transform into powerful beasts. The elite Incarnate troop, led by Captain Hank Henriette and Vice-Captain Cain Madhouse with physician Elaine Bluelake, achieves numerous victories. However, Elaine discovers the transformations prove irreversible as the Incarnates gradually lose control of their powers. Following a member's violent rampage and suicide, the troop establishes a pact to eliminate any comrade who loses their humanity. As Northern victory approaches, Elaine determines the Incarnates will eventually threaten mankind. She attempts to execute Hank before taking her own life, but Cain unexpectedly kills her instead. When Hank awakens two months later, intelligence officer Liza Runecastle informs him the war has ended, Elaine has disappeared, and Cain has released the remaining Incarnates—now wreaking havoc across Patria. Remembering Elaine's death, Hank assumes the mantle of Beast Hunter, dedicating himself to eliminating rogue Incarnates while pursuing vengeance against Cain.
2	"The Dragon's Daughter"; Transliteration: "Ryū no Musume" (Japanese: 竜の娘)	8 July 2019
John William Bancroft operates an orphanage with his daughter Schaal in Rivulet Wood village during the Confederacy war. Federal soldiers recruit Will for Incarnate research due to his compatibility, which he accepts to secure orphanage funding. He returns post-war as the Nidhogg Incarnate, a giant brown dragon retaining human cognition but developing violent nocturnal episodes. Following livestock attacks, villagers restrain Will and relocate the orphans. Schaal remains with her father until finding him mortally wounded by a white-robed man—Hank Henriette. Schaal tracks Hank to Burnwood town. When she attempts to shoot him, Hank demonstrates his Incarnate immunity to conventional weapons and explains his mission to eliminate rogue Incarnates. Their confrontation intensifies when Danny, a local Spriggan Incarnate, attacks the town. Hank executes Danny according to the Incarnates' pact. Schaal questions why her father and others had to die after the war's end. Unsatisfied with Hank's vague explanations about their wartime oath, she decides to accompany him and uncover the truth about the Incarnates' fate.
3	"The Minotaur's Fortress"; Transliteration: "Minotaurosu no Yōsai" (Japanese: ミノタウロスの要塞)	15 July 2019
Schaal accompanies Hank to Rouge Hill after reports surface of a Minotaur Incarnate constructing a destructive fortress. Military intelligence officer Liza Runecastle briefs them on Theo Sherman, a paranoid veteran building the labyrinthine structure. She provides Godkiller bullets, the only weapons effective against Incarnates. While infiltrating the fortress, Hank reveals Theo's history as a fearful soldier he once comforts in battle. When confronted, Theo's madness forces Hank to reveal his own Werewolf Incarnate form—the God of War. After subduing Theo, Hank executes him with solemn dignity, prompting Schaal to recall her father Will's peaceful acceptance of death. Meanwhile in Newfort, Captain Claude of the Coup de Grace extermination squad receives public acclaim for eliminating Incarnates, though he remains grimly determined to complete his mission. Elsewhere, Hank's former comrade Cain monitors their progress with a white-haired child, mocking Hank's continued entanglement with destiny.
4	"March of the Behemoth"; Transliteration: "Behimosu no Mōshin" (Japanese: 巨獣の猛進)	22 July 2019
During wartime, Hank encounters a quiet young artist named Artie near a military camp. In modern times, Hank and Schaal travel by train to South Patria, crossing a symbolic iron bridge built after the war. Military intelligence officer Liza Runecastle informs them of a Behemoth Incarnate approaching the bridge. Hank recognizes the creature as Artie, now transformed but retaining some humanity. Despite military efforts to stop it, the Behemoth continues toward the bridge. Hank explains Artie's peaceful nature and artistic past. Schaal deduces the creature seeks to view the sea. When railway workers provoke the Behemoth, Hank as the Werewolf Incarnate intervenes. Explosives reveal the sea vista Artie desired, bringing the creature to tears before its death. Afterward, Hank and Schaal find solace in fulfilling Artie's final wish. Liza reports Cain Madhouse's location in Whitechurch, where Hank's former vice-captain experiments on civilians with a mysterious girl named Migileglia, turning them into violent mutants.
5	"Gargoyle's Judgement"; Transliteration: "Gāgoiru no Danzai" (Japanese: ガーゴイルの断罪)	29 July 2019
Hank, Schaal, and Liza investigate Whitechurch's slums following reports of Cain's murders. Residents refuse to cooperate with military personnel. That night, Hank recalls Elaine's death while Schaal mends his jacket, bonding over their orphanage backgrounds. The next day, they examine a crucified victim, recognizing Gargoyle Incarnate Christopher "Topher" Keynes' handiwork. Local boy Andy reveals Topher murdered his mother. When Topher attacks, Hank intervenes but is wounded. Topher escapes to an abandoned church after declaring his twisted justice. At the church, Hank battles Topher, who justifies killing criminals as divine justice. Andy arrives with Schaal's rifle but fails. Hank ultimately executes Topher, who dies disillusioned. Cain appears, revealing he supplied the Godkiller bullet, and kidnaps Schaal, demanding Hank attend his "party". Meanwhile, Claude Withers and the Coup de Grace troop arrive in Whitechurch, preparing for confrontation. The city becomes ground zero for the escalating conflict between former Incarnate troop members.
6	"The King of the Beasts"; Transliteration: "Kemono no Ō" (Japanese: 獣の王)	5 August 2019
After defeating Topher, Hank awakens from a coma to find Schaal captured by Cain. He proceeds to Cain's manor, where wealthy war victims gather. Cain declares Incarnates should reclaim what was taken from them, justifying recent murders as liberation from human constraints. When a guest is killed, Hank intervenes, prompting Cain to question why Incarnates must be eradicated. Claude and the Coup de Grace troop storm the manor, battling Cain's Incarnate army. After surviving an explosion, Cain shoots Schaal to "free" Hank from emotional bonds. Witnessing Schaal fall, Hank's Werewolf Incarnate form evolves into the uncontrollable 'King of Beasts, destroying part of Whitechurch before disappearing. Claude awakens in a military hospital to find a massive canyon dividing Whitechurch. Both Hank and Cain remain missing, while Schaal and Gerald lie comatose. Liza expresses concern over Hank's disappearance and the unprecedented destruction caused by his transformation.
7	"The Trigger of Memories"; Transliteration: "Tsuioku no Hikigane" (Japanese: 追憶の引鉄)	12 August 2019
The Whitechurch Incident and Cain's subsequent rebellion shock Patria. Cain declares the formation of New Patria, rallying discontented citizens and Incarnates against the corrupt Northern government. In response, the government orders the extermination of all remaining Incarnates. One month later, Schaal recovers in Rivulet Wood, haunted by her role in Hank's transformation. She learns the military has stripped Hank of his rank. While visiting her father's grave, she joins Claude's Coup de Grace troop to hunt an Incarnate in the mountains. They discover the target is her reanimated father, William, now a decayed beast. Despite initial hesitation, Schaal executes William with Godkiller bullets when he attacks their town. In his final moments, William regains humanity and bids farewell. This experience solidifies Schaal's resolve to find an alternative to killing Incarnates. She joins Claude's squad to search for Hank, though his whereabouts remain unknown. Claude reveals his identity as the president's son, while Liza provides Schaal with equipment. The team prepares to confront the growing Incarnate threat as political tensions escalate across Patria.
8	"Songstress of Sleep"; Transliteration: "Nemuri no Utahime" (Japanese: 眠りの歌姫)	19 August 2019
President Richard Withers pressures officials to accelerate the Incarnate extermination campaign, demanding completion within three months. Meanwhile, Cain fortifies Bold Creek while awaiting both government forces and an unspecified individual. The Coup de Grace troop prepares in Port Gulf, delayed by equipment shortages. Schaal encounters Siren Incarnate Beatrice ("Trice"), a former singer hiding from bounty hunters with her manager Charles. When townspeople kill Charles, Trice uses her hypnotic song to make citizens sleep eternally. Claude orders her elimination, but Schaal intervenes, allowing Trice one final performance before her peaceful death. This confrontation reveals Claude as Cain's half-brother and his determination to eradicate all Incarnates, despite Schaal's growing sympathy for those retaining humanity. Meanwhile, in the mountains, Hank—now avoiding his Incarnate power after the Whitechurch destruction—kills Sasquatch Incarnate Vic with grenades when attacked. As he recovers, Garmr Incarnate tracks him. Claude's troops simultaneously discover Hank's mountain location, setting the stage for their eventual confrontation.
9	"The Hound of Hell's Gate"; Transliteration: "Meifu no Banken" (Japanese: 冥府の番犬)	26 August 2019
Following the Whitechurch incident, Hank wanders the Great Mountains, tormented by guilt over his lost control as the King of Beasts. When Garmr Incarnate Roy—a former comrade—attacks, Hank refuses to use his Incarnate power despite severe injuries. Roy criticizes Hank's denial of his true nature and their shared destiny with Cain's faction. Meanwhile, the Coup de Grace troop searches for Hank. Schaal advocates for peaceful solutions, explaining to Claude her desire to find a way to restore Incarnates' humanity. When they locate Hank, he battles Roy at nightfall. Though initially resisting transformation, Hank's werewolf form emerges during the fight before fear overwhelms him. As Roy prepares the final blow, the troop intervenes. Their attack destabilizes the cliff, causing Hank to fall into the canyon below. Schaal calls out desperately as Hank disappears into the darkness, his fate uncertain.
10	"Two Oaths"; Transliteration: "Futatsu no Chikai" (Japanese: ニつの誓い)	2 September 2019
Roy, formerly an infantryman transformed into Garmr Incarnate by Elaine's experiments, recalls fighting alongside Hank during the war. In the present, Roy escapes the cliffside battle but suffers heavy injuries from Coup de Grace troop attacks. Meanwhile, Hank awakens in a cave with Schaal, who reveals she euthanized her resurrected father to spare him further suffering. Hank confesses his doubts about redeeming his fallen comrades and fears his inevitable transformation into the King of Beasts. He begs Schaal to kill him should he lose control. As Roy battles the troop, Schaal intervenes when Hank attempts mutual destruction with Roy at the river. She vows to preserve Hank's humanity, inspiring him to fight on. Hank transforms and defeats Roy, who briefly regains human form before death. The victorious but exhausted Hank and Schaal then face Claude's armed troop, who finally initiates dialogue.
11	"The Start of Troubles Ahead"; Transliteration: "Sōran no Kōshi" (Japanese: 騒乱の嚆矢)	9 September 2019
Patria soldiers discover New Patria's fortress at Bold Creek before Centaur Incarnate Miles Byron eliminates them. In the capital, officials plan military action against the strategic stronghold. Meanwhile, Claude interrogates Hank at Muzzle Peak Lookout, demanding information about remaining Incarnates and Cain's motives. Hank, wearing a Coup de Grace uniform to conceal his identity, joins the assault force. At Bold Creek, Hank devises a night attack strategy against Miles' sniping advantage. Though initially successful, Miles reveals regenerative abilities before retreating. The next day, as trench digging begins, Miles tends to wounded New Patria soldiers, justifying his dual role as healer and killer. During the main assault, Miles inflicts heavy casualties until Hank disables him with explosives. In their final confrontation at sunset, Hank transforms into his werewolf form against the regenerating Miles. As the Incarnates battle, Martin prepares an unspecified secret weapon, leaving Claude perplexed. Throughout the operation, Schaal maintains watch over Hank, ensuring he retains control of his powers.
12	"Those Who Seek"; Transliteration: "Ousha-tachi" (Japanese: 追う者たち)	16 September 2019
Miglieglia resurrects corpses to assault the Southern Capital while Hank battles Miles at Bold Creek. Hank pins Miles and signals artillery fire, but Miles' regeneration persists until exposure to Alphahard poison—a Hydra Incarnate-based weapon deployed by President Richard that kills both Incarnates and soldiers. Cain arrives, slaughtering troops and forcing Martin to ingest the poison. Revealing the fortress as a diversion, Cain explains his true objective: preventing the North-South alliance against New Patria. He argues Incarnates are exploited tools, while Hank maintains both humans and Incarnates must atone for mistakes. Their battle culminates with Hank awakening new powers to repel Cain, who retreats vowing future confrontation. With Bold Creek secured but the South fallen, forces withdraw to defend the capital. Hank and Schaal depart, having gained Claude's support. Meanwhile, Cain monitors Elaine's preserved body in a glass tank, hinting at her connection to Somnium and impending revelation of the Incarnates' true purpose. The stage is set for Patria's final confrontation.

== Reception ==
The first volume of the series reached 39th place on the weekly Oricon comics rankings, with 22,468 copies sold; the second volume reached 31st place, with 18,638 copies sold; the third volume reached 39th place, with 28,018 copies sold; and the fourth volume reached 24th place, with 32,728 copies sold.

== See also ==
- Dusk Maiden of Amnesia, another manga series by the same creator
- Tales of Wedding Rings, another manga series by the same creator
