= Mibu Gishiden =

Japanese manga series

- First tankōbon volume cover published by Shueisha

壬生義士伝 (Mibu Gishi Den)
- Genre: Drama; Historical
- Manga
- Written by: Jirō Asada
- Illustrated by: Takumi Nagayasu
- Published by: Kadokawa Shoten (May 2008– September 2008); Kodansha (July 2010–April 2012); Shueisha (April 2014–July 2023)
- Magazine: Comic Charge (December 2007–February 2009); Bessatsu Shōnen Magazine (February 2010–March 2012); Garaku.mag (April 2014–August 2015); Official website (August 2016–July 2023)
- Original run: November 20, 2007 – July 7, 2023
- Volumes: 13

Mibu Gishiden (壬生義士伝, Mibu Gishi Den; lit. 'Legend of the Loyal Retainers of Mibu') is a Japanese manga series adapted from the novel of the same name, written by Jiro Asada and illustrated by Takumi Nagayasu. It follows the lives of two Shinsengumi towards the end of the Tokugawa shogunate.

The manga was published over a long period of time, and by several publishers. It was initially serialized in Kadokawa Shoten's seinen manga magazine, Comic Charge, in November 2007. However, when that magazine was discontinued in January 2009, the manga was transferred to Kodansha's shōnen manga magazine, Bessatsu Shōnen Magazine. Publication in the new magazine ran from January 2010 to February 2012. It was then moved to the publisher Homesha's Garaku.mag manga website in April 2014. That magazine ceased publication in August 2015, so serialization resumed on the manga's own official website in August 2016. The serialization was completed in July 2023, and its chapters were collected in 13 tankōbon volumes in the same month.

== Plot ==
Set during the final years of the Tokugawa shogunate, the story follows the lives of those in the Shinsengumi, particularly Yoshimura Kanichiro and Saitō Hajime. The story is told largely through flashbacks, as Saitō and others recall Yoshimura's life and actions during the turbulent Bakumatsu period. Yoshimura, a samurai from the impoverished Nambu Morioka domain, joins the Shinsengumi in Kyoto and becomes known among his comrades as a man obsessed with money. As political conflict intensifies and the shogunate begins to collapse, Yoshimura continues to fight alongside the Shinsengumi while sending money back to support his wife and children in his home domain.

== Production ==
Takumi Nagayasu licensed the original work from Jiro Asada in 2003, and then spent about three years researching and creating the setting. He had various physical crises while creating the work, but by the end of 2023, he had completed the manga, covering about 2,650 pages. Mibu Gishiden is the first historical drama work that he has created. He modeled the protagonists Yoshimura and Saito on two actors: Gō Katō and Yoshio Harada. Nagayasu described the narrative of the manga as faithful to the original novel, but said that he created a unique visual expression in the manga so that younger readers unfamiliar with period dramas could easily understand the story. He also mentioned that Sōrōbun letters, which were translated into modern language under the supervision of Asada, played an important role in the ultimate framing of the manga.

== Publication ==
Mibu Gishiden was adapted from by illustrator Takumi Nagayasu from the novel of the same name written by Jiro Asada. Publication of the manga was particularly complex, as it was handlied by several publishers during the serialization. Mibu Gishiden started in Kadokawa Shoten's seinen manga magazine Comic Charge on November 20, 2007. (Note: It started in the magazine's 17th issue of 2007 (cover date December 4), released on November 20 of that same year.) It ran there until the magazine was discontinued on January 20, 2009. (Note: The magazine finished with its third issue of 2009 (cover date February 3), released on January 20 of that same year.) The series transferred to Kodansha's shōnen manga magazine Bessatsu Shōnen Magazine on January 9, 2010, (Note: It started in the magazine's February 2010 issue (cover date February 1), released on January 9 of that same year.) but it ceased publication in that magazine on February 9, 2012. (Note: It ended in the magazine's March 2012 issue (cover date March 1), released on February 9 of that same year.) It then moved to the publisher's Homesha's Garaku.mag web manga site: resuming the serialization on April 17, 2014. On August 17, 2015, that magazine in turn ceased publication, so the series resumed on its own official website on August 5, 2016. In 2020, the health concerns of Takumi Nagayasu, who had suffered a stroke, also affected the publication. However, the serialization was finally completed on July 7, 2023.

Kadokawa Shoten published the first and second volumes in May and September 2008, respectively. Kodansha published the first four volumes from July 2010 to April 2012. Shueisha went on to collected all the chapters in thirteen tankōbon volumes, with the first four volumes published on April 17, 2014, and the last volume on July 19, 2023. In France, the manga is licensed by Mangetsu; and in Taiwan by Tong Li Publishing.

=== Volumes ===
| No. | Release date | ISBN |
|---|---|---|
| 1 | April 17, 2014 | 978-4-83428-430-0 |
| 2 | April 17, 2014 | 978-4-83428-431-7 |
| 3 | April 17, 2014 | 978-4-83428-432-4 |
| 4 | April 17, 2014 | 978-4-83428-433-1 |
| 5 | December 12, 2014 | 978-4-83428-439-3 |
| 6 | December 16, 2016 | 978-4-83428-463-8 |
| 7 | March 16, 2017 | 978-4-83428-470-6 |
| 8 | November 19, 2018 | 978-4-83428-490-4 |
| 9 | April 19, 2019 | 978-4-83428-496-6 |
| 10 | December 18, 2020 | 978-4-83428-511-6 |
| 11 | October 19, 2021 | 978-4-83428-519-2 |
| 12 | August 19, 2022 | 978-4-83428-529-1 |
| 13 | July 19, 2023 | 978-4-83428-532-1 |

== Reception ==
Mibu Gishiden has been widely acclaimed by critics. Manga Sanctuary gave the manga's first volume a score of 9 out of 10. They said that its "realistic" style showed a good flow of emotion; the narrative was "engaging"; and they found the discovery of different aspects of the main character to be a very interesting slant. Another Manga Sanctuary reviewer also praised the manga, calling its story "full of traditional values" and praising its graphics, calling it like "a little gem" and writing that "there is particular care taken in the representation of the sets, locations and costumes to make them very realistic and neat, giving it a beautiful immersion." Planete BD reviewer Faustine Lillaz gave the first volume an overall rating of two stars (out of four) and called it "surprising", but criticized its screenplay and considered it to have no clear purpose, in that it lacked engaging characters. She found that readers might struggle to immerse themselves in the story, but she praised the drawings and gave them a grade of "very good" and called them neat and mature. She called the second volume a fairly decent and very encouraging sequel, describing the story as improved and the characters "better developed." Manga News described the manga as having a rich historical context, with comprehensive and detailed depictions, and a story that is "exemplary with precision and richness and a very realistic design."
