= Stunts (manga) =

Japanese manga series

- First tankōbon volume cover

STUNTS 9番目のゴースト (Stunts: 9-banme no Ghost)
- Genre: Crime; Suspense
- Manga
- Written by: Sora Daichi
- Published by: Kodansha
- Magazine: Bessatsu Shōnen Magazine
- Original run: September 9, 2022 – November 9, 2023
- Volumes: 3

Stunts (Japanese: STUNTS 9番目のゴースト, Hepburn: Stunts: 9-banme no Ghost) is a Japanese manga series written and illustrated by Sora Daichi. It was serialized in Kodansha's shōnen manga magazine Bessatsu Shōnen Magazine from September 2022 to November 2023, with its chapters collected in three tankōbon volumes.

== Publication ==
Written and illustrated by Sora Daichi, Stunts was serialized in Kodansha's shōnen manga magazine Bessatsu Shōnen Magazine from September 9, 2022, to November 9, 2023. Kodansha collected its chapters in three tankōbon volumes, released from February 9, 2023, to January 9, 2024.

The manga is licensed in France by Glénat Éditions.

=== Volumes ===
No.	Japanese release date	Japanese ISBN
1	February 9, 2023	978-4-06-530318-4
2	July 7, 2023	978-4-06-532171-3
3	January 9, 2024	978-4-06-534175-9
