= Ao Jūmonji =

Japanese light novelist

Ao Jūmonji 十文字青
- Born: Hokuto, Hokkaidō Prefecture, Japan
- Education: Hokkaidō University, Department of Literature Graduate
- Occupation: Novelist
- Writing career
- Pen name: Mizore Tōgami (Originally); Ao Jūmonji (Current)
- Language: Japanese
- Period: 2003–
- Genres: Light novel, fantasy
- Notable works: Bara no Maria series Grimgar of Fantasy and Ash series
- Notable awards: 7th Kadokawa Gakuen Novel Prize Award Special Prize
- Website: brainx

Ao Jūmonji (十文字青, Jūmonji Ao) is a Japanese light novelist. He is from Hokuto, Hokkaidō Prefecture and graduated from Hokkaido University.

== Career ==
Originally, his pen name was Mizore Tōgami (十神霙), however he changed it to Ao Jūmonji (十文字青) due to finding the kanji for Mizore (霙) difficult to read for the reader. The first novel he ever wrote became the prototype for his debut series Bara no Maria (薔薇のマリア, lit. Maria of the Roses). In 2003, his novel Jyunketsu Burū Supuringu (純潔ブルースプリング, lit. Pure Blue Spring) won the special prize in the 7th Kadokawa Gakuen Novel Awards. (Note: Published in 2009.) And in 2004, he officially debuted with the first volume of Bara no Maria.

Prior to his career as a writer, Jūmonji was a street musician selling his own original music. When the radio drama of Bara no Maria was released in 2006, under the pseudonym rosen, he wrote, composed and provided vocals for the song Don't make me alone.

He is a prolific writer, having published 14 volumes in 2015 and consistently producing at least 4 volumes annually.

== Works ==
=== Novels ===
==== Series ====
- Bara no Maria (薔薇のマリア) (Illustrated by BUNBUN, published by Kadokawa Sneaker Bunko, 27 volumes, 2004–2014)
  - Noraneko Marie (ノラ猫マリィ) (Illustrated by BUNBUN, published by Kadokawa Sneaker Bunko, 1 volume, 2016–)
- ANGEL+DIVE (Illustrated by Shin Aoki, published by Ichijinsha Pocket edition, 6 volumes, 2008–)
- Itsumo Kokoro ni Ken o (いつも心に剣を) (Illustrated by kaya8, published by MF Bunko J, 5 volumes, 2009–2010)
- Baketero (ばけてろ) (Illustrated by Mikotoakemi, published by Kadokawa Sneaker Bunko, 2 volumes, 2009–2010)
- Daiku Series (第九シリーズ)
  - Purirun ~Tokushu Sōtaisei Kōfukuron Jyosetsu~ (ぷりるん。～特殊相対性幸福論序説～) (Illustrated by Ma@ya, published by Ichijinsha Pocket edition, 1 volume, 2009)
  - Vampire:no:ism (ヴァンパイアノイズム) (Illustrated by Ma@ya, published by Ichijinsha Pocket edition, 1 volume, 2009)
  - Zetsubō Dōmei (絶望同盟) (Illustrated by Ma@ya, published by Ichijinsha Pocket edition, 1 volume, 2010)
  - Kizashikami (萌神) (Illustrated by Ma@ya, published by Ichijinsha Pocket edition, 1 volume, 2010)
- Kuro no Striker (黒のストライカ) (Illustrated by Suzuri, published by MF Bunko J, 5 volumes, 2010–2012)
- Seidanzai Dorothy (聖断罪ドロシー) (Illustrated by Suburi, published by Kadokawa Sneaker Bunko, 3 volumes, 2012–)
- Ichinen Jyūkumi no Funtō (一年十組の奮闘) (Illustrated by Shirabii, published by MF Bunko J, 3 volumes, 2012–2013)
- Saihate no Higashi (最果ての東) (Illustrated by THORES Shibamoto, published by Kodansha LIGHTNOVEL, 2 volumes, 2013–)
- Grimgar of Fantasy and Ash (灰と幻想のグリムガル, Hai to Gensō no Grimgar) (Illustrated by Eiri Shirai, published by Overlap, 19 volumes + 2 short story collections, 2013–)
- Taieiyū ga Mushoku de Nani ga Warui (大英雄が無職で何が悪い) (Illustrated by Suwaru Erect, published by Overlap, serialized on Shōsetsuka ni Narō, 3 volumes, 2014–)
- Danmatsu no Mireniwon (断末のミレニヲン) (Illustrated by so-bin, Kadokawa Sneaker Bunko, 2 volumes, 2015–)
- Sakura × Saku (サクラ×サク) (Illustrated by gin, published by DASH X Bunko, 4 volumes, 2015–)
- Elysion Futatsu no Rakuen o Mawaru Monogatari (Elysion 二つの楽園を廻る物語) (Originally created by Sound Horizon, illustrated by Hidari, published by Kadokawa Shōten, 2 volumes, 2015)
- Roman Fuyu no Asa to Seinaru Yoru o Mawaru Kimi no Monogatari (Roman 冬の朝と聖なる夜を廻る君の物語) (Originally created by Sound Horizon, illustrated by Hidari, published by Kadokawa Shōten, 2 volumes, 2016)
- Kyōkai Tantei Monstrum (境界探偵モンストルム) (Illustrated by Akira Banpai, published by Novel 0, 2 volumes, 2016–)
- Mahōtsukai to Boku (魔法使いと僕) (Illustrated by Mieko Hosoi, published by Overlap, 1 volume, 2016–)
- Boku wa Nandomo Umarekawaru (僕は何度も生まれ変わる) (Illustrated by da-kuro, published by Kadokawa Sneaker Bunko, 2 volumes, 2018–)
- Daiyon Taisen (第四大戦) (Illustrated by Reita, published by Novelism, 1 volume, 2021–)

==== Standalone novels ====
- Jyunketsu Blue Spring (純潔ブルースプリング) (Illustrated by Maya Ishii, published by Kadokawa Shōten, 2009)
- Boku no Uta (ぼくのうた) (Illustrated by Taira Katō, published by Genrō Fantasia Novels, 2010)
- Shaggy Rock Heaven (シャギーロックヘヴン) (Illustrated by moz, published by Genrō Fantasia Novels, 2010)
- Megakuru Idea (メガクルイデア) (Illustrated by mebae, published by Genrō Fantasia Novels, 2011)
- Zenmetsu Now (全滅なう) (Illustrated by Ma@ya, published by Ichijinsha Pocket edition, 2011)
- Hatenaki Ten no Fatarushisu (果てなき天のファタルシス) (Illustrated by Nekomegane, published by Seikaishi FICTIONS, 2013)
- My World (マイワールド) (Illustrated by Hiko, published by Seikaishi FICTIONS, 2013)
- Jitsuzonkei Dogma Sutora Yūsha Takejyō no Aoki Ruten (実存系ドグマストラ 勇者タケジョーの青き流転) (Illustrated by Makoto Akirama, published by T-LINE NOVELS, 2015)

==== Serial works ====
- Daiyon Taisei (第四大戦) (Illustrated by Reita, published by Novelism, 2020–)
- Troll Neko wa Kataranai (トロール猫は語らない) (Illustrated by Yōshi, published by peep, 2020–)

==== Anthologies ====
- Anehina-san wa Dare wo Koroshita no ka (アネヒナさんは誰を殺したのか) (Published in Kadokawa Characters Novel Act 1 (カドカワキャラクターズ ノベルアクト 1), published by Kadokawa Shōten, 2010)
- Senmetsu Rukifā (殲滅ルキファー) (Illustrated by ky, published in The Sneaker, published by Kadokawa Shōten, February 2011 and April 2011 editions)
- Chisana Boku no Kakumei (小さな僕の革命) (Published in S-F Magazine (February 2012 edition), published by Hayakawa Publishing)
- Watashi no Neko (私の猫) (published in Seikaishi Calendar Novel 2012 (Part One) (星海社カレンダー小説2012(上)), published by Seikaishi, 2012)

=== Manga ===
- Bara no Maria (薔薇のマリア) (Published in Beans Ace (ビーンズエース) (Vol. 6 – Vol. 18), illustrated by Sunao Misuzu, original character design by BUNBUN, 3 volumes, 2007–2009)

=== Anime ===
- Fairy Gone (Series composition, screenwriting, 2019)
