= Jirō Asada =

Japanese writer

Kōjirō Iwato (岩戸 康次郎, Iwato Kōjirō; born December 13, 1951), known by his pen name Jirō Asada (浅田 次郎, Asada Jirō), is a Japanese writer.

In 1991, his novel Torarete tamaruka! (とられてたまるか!) started his literary career. After writing several picaresque novels, his novel Metro ni notte (地下鉄に乗って) was awarded the Eiji Yoshikawa Prize for New Writers and made into a 2006 film; a short story collection The Stationmaster and other stories (Poppoya (鉄道員)) was also awarded the Naoki Prize. He writes also historical and Chinese historical novels such as The Firmament of the Pleiades (Sōkyū no subaru, 蒼穹の昴). He writes in the traditional style of Japanese popular fiction.

== Career ==
Asada was born in Tokyo on 13 December 1951. Asada claims that an ancestor of his was a samurai under the Tokugawa shogunate. He graduated from Suginami High School, which is attached to Chuo University. Inspired by Yukio Mishima, who committed suicide after a failed coup d'état among Japan Self-Defense Forces, Asada enlisted in the SDF after finishing his studies. He changed jobs many times while endeavoring to find writing opportunities, submitting his works to literary competitions.

His novels often depict yakuza and it has been said that in this respect, they are autobiographical. Asada has stated that he was once connected to a gang, specifically someone who ran businesses to raise funds for organised crime. Asada was connected to a "Nezumi kou" (a pyramid scheme fraud). However, Asada has denied ever having been an actual member of a gangster organization. There was a period when he lived on money earned from gambling, and thus he has written many essays related to horse racing.

In 1991, Asada became known for his novel Torarete tamaruka! (とられてたまるか!). This novel was his first work that passed through a preliminary selection of a literary prize for new writers, so he took his pen name after this novel's protagonist.

Because of the picaresque nature of his early works, Asada has often been described as a picaresque writer. However, after winning the Eiji Yoshikawa Prize for New Writers for Metro ni notte (地下鉄に乗って) in 1995, his style and range of writing changed and expanded dramatically. His historical novel The Firmament of the Pleiades (Sōkyū no subaru, 蒼穹の昴), which vividly described the last stages of the Qing dynasty, was nominated for the Naoki prize of 1996.

== Literary style ==
He wrote Mibu Gishi Den (壬生義士伝) based on the stories of the Shinsen Gumi, and Ohara meshi mase (お腹召しませ). He describes himself as Shōsetsu no taishū shokudō (小説の大衆食堂) meaning that he is a "cheap public restaurant", delivering any topic that the public wants. He also says that writing is the best hobby for him; consequently he has written more than 70 works in his 14 years of novelist activity, and is still eager to publish new novels. Regarding his modern novels, Asada is nicknamed "Heisei no nakase ya" (平成の泣かせ屋), meaning that he is good at moving readers to tears.

Asada acknowledges that he is a heavy smoker, and asserted the rights of the smoker in an essay "Yūki rin-rin ruri no iro" (勇気凛凛ルリの色). Further, every kind of gambling is his hobby, in addition to the horse racing as mentioned above, so there are essays related to gambling such as "Oh my Gah!" (オー・マイ・ガアッ!) and "Casino!" (カッシーノ!).

== Works in English translation ==
- Short story collection
  - The Stationmaster (original title: Poppoya), trans. Terry Gallagher (VIZ Media, 2009 / Shueisha English Edition, 2013)
    - The Stationmaster (original title: Poppoya)
    - Love Letter (original title: Rabu retā)
    - Devil (original title: Akuma)
    - In Tsunohazu (original title: Tsunohazu nite)
    - Kyara (original title: Kyara)
    - The Festival of Lanterns (original title: Urabon'e)
    - No-Good Santa (original title: Rokudenashi no santa)
    - Invitation from the Orion Cinema (original title: Orion-za kara no shōtaijō)

== Awards ==
- 1995 - 16th Yoshikawa Eiji Prize for New Writers for Metro ni notte (地下鉄に乗って).
- 1997 - 16th Japanese adventure fiction association special prize and 117th Naoki Prize for The Stationmaster and other stories (short story collection).
- 2000 - Shibata Renzaburo prize for Mibu Gishi Den (壬生義士伝, When the Last Sword Is Drawn) and best dresser prize of Japan.
- 2006 - 1st Chuo Koron literature prize for Ohara meshi mase (お腹召しませ) and 10th Shiba Ryotaro prize.

== Film adaptations ==
Japanese films

- Poppoya (The Stationmaster)
- When the Last Sword Is Drawn

South Korean film

- Failan (Love Letter)

== Manga ==
- Mibu Gishiden (2007–2023) (illustrated by Takumi Nagayasu)
