= List of The Flowers of Evil chapters =

The chapters of the Japanese manga The Flowers of Evil are written and illustrated by Shūzō Oshimi. The story follows a middle school student named Takao Kasuga who is forced into a "contract" by fellow student Sawa Nakamura, after being caught stealing the gym clothes of his crush Nanako Saeki, and the series of events afterwards that follow these three characters. The manga was launched in the first issue of the Japanese manga magazine Bessatsu Shōnen Magazine published by Kodansha on September 9, 2009, and ended on May 9, 2014. Kodansha has compiled the 57 chapters into 11 volumes from March 17, 2010 to June 9, 2014. The series was licensed in North America by Vertical in September 2011, with the first volume published on May 8, 2012 and the last volume on October 14, 2014.

== Chapter list ==
No.	Original release date	Original ISBN	North American release date	North American ISBN
1	March 17, 2010	978-4-06-384277-7	May 8, 2012	978-1-935654-46-9
01. "The Flowers of Evil" (悪の華, Aku no Hana); 02. "Invitation to a Journey" (旅への誘い, Tabi e no Sasoi); 03. "Cause for Blackmail" (脅迫の理由, Kyōhaku no Riyū); 04. "Cloudy Skies" (曇り空, Kumorizora); 05. "A Promise" (約束, Yakusoku); 06. "Immorality" (背徳, Haitoku)
Forgetting his copy of Les Fleurs du mal at school, Kasuga goes back and stumbles upon Saeki's gym uniform, stealing it in a panic. Nakamura tells him that she saw him stealing the uniform and forces him to form a contract with her. When he does not write her an essay, she strips him and forces him to wear the uniform. After Kasuga defends Nakamura from an accusation of stealing, Saeki tells him that he was really cool. Later, he manages to ask her out on a date. Nakamura meets him before the date and makes him wear the uniform underneath his clothes.
2	September 17, 2010	978-4-06-384370-5	July 10, 2012	978-1-935654-47-6
07. "Madness" (暴走, Bōsō); 08. "Confession" (告白, Kokuhaku); 09. "The Fraying String" (ほつれる糸, Hotsureru Ito); 10. "Spleen and Ideal" (憂鬱と理想, Yūutsu to Risō); 11. "That Which Is Not Easily Saved" (救いがたいもの, Sukui Gatai Mono); 12. "That which Punishes Self and Soul" (われとわが身を罰するもの, Ware to Wagami o Bassuru Dono)
Kasuga takes Saeki to a used bookstore and gifts her a copy of Les Fleurs du mal. In a park, Saeki asks him to enter into a relationship with her. Nakamura splashes him with a bucket of water, revealing the uniform underneath his clothes, and Kasuga flees. Saeki mishears Nakamura teasing Kasuga about her and thinks that she wants to have sex with Kasuga. After failing to tell Saeki about his theft, Kasuga begs Nakamura to tell her the truth. Nakamura and Kasuga meet in the school at night and proceed to heavily vandalize it. Kasuga writes a confession on the blackboard, draws the flower from the cover of Les Fleurs du mal on the floor, and places the uniform in the center.
3	February 9, 2011	978-4-06-384436-8	October 23, 2012	978-1-935654-48-3
13. "A Dawn of the Heart" (心の夜明け, Kokoro no Yoake); 14. "Melancholy" (憂鬱, Yūutsu); 15. "Twilight" (たそがれ時, Tasogaredoki); 16. "The Offended Moon" (機嫌を損じた月, Kigen o Sonjita Tsuki); 17. "De Profundis" (深淵より叫びぬ, Shin'en yori Sakebinu); "Special Episode" (特別番外編, Tokubetsu Bangai-hen)
The next day an assembly is called and students are sent home, but Kasuga is not incriminated because his name in the confession was covered by ink. Saeki confronts Kasuga, recognizing the flower drawn on the floor and he requests a breakup. She refuses and visits his home later, asking that Kasuga be more open to her. Kasuga's mother discovers the ink-stained clothes from the previous night and Kasuga runs away. He meets Nakamura and she tells him to ride his bicycle towards the mountains. Saeki finds them at night, and tries to make Kasuga come back. However, Kasuga is unable to choose between the two girls, estranging both of them. The police come searching for Saeki and drive them all to the police station.
4	August 9, 2011	978-4-06-384528-0	January 15, 2013	978-1-935654-49-0
18. "The Sun" (太陽, Taiyō); 19. "A Certain Curious Man's Dream" (あるもの好き男の夢, Aru Monozuki Otoko no Yume); 20. "A Certain Boy's Promise" (ある少年の約束, Aru Shōnen no Yakusoku); 21. "The Curious Man's Dream" (もの好き男の夢, Monozuki Otoko no Yume); 22. "The Flowers of Evil in Lovely Bloom" (惡の華 可憐に咲く, Aku no Hana Karen ni Saku)
A month after their encounter in the mountains, Saeki breaks up with Kasuga. Resolving to help Nakamura, Kasuga writes an essay for her. However, she runs away from him and Kasuga ends up meeting her father at their house. Kasuga goes into her room and finds her diary, which chronicles her boredom and attempted escape from tedium with Kasuga. Kasuga builds a makeshift hideout for them and decorates it with panties stolen from all the girls in his class, gaining Nakamura's approval.
5	January 6, 2012	978-4-06-384611-9	April 16, 2013	978-1-935654-70-4
23. "Dance of Ruination" (破滅の舞踏, Hametsu no Butō); 24. "Song of Summer" (夏の歌, Natsu no Uta); 25. "The Flowers of Goddess" (女神の華, Megami no Hana); 26. "The Doings of Men and Women in Love" (愛し合う男女の, Aishiau Danjo no); 27. "A Darkening Sky" (かげる空, Kageru Sora)
Before the start of summer vacation, Kasuga places a pair of panties on top of a school statue. Saeki and Kinoshita follow him to his hideout and Saeki vows to punish them. Kasuga and Nakamura nail the panties onto plywood, planning to show them at the summer festival. Saeki discovers the plywood and lures Kasuga to his hideout. There, she rapes him, but Kasuga resists, causing her to burn the hideout down. Saeki confronts Nakamura, but she only hugs her, causing Saeki to admit that she is jealous of her. Meanwhile, a firefighter discovers Nakamura's planner at the scene of the fire.
6	June 8, 2012	978-4-06-384681-2	July 9, 2013	978-1-935654-91-9
28. "A Heatless Sun" (熱のない太陽, Netsu no Nai Taiyō); 29. "Tomorrow Morning Will You Yet Be?" (明日の朝、君達は果たして？, Ashita no Asa, Kimi-tachi wa Hatashite?); 30. "Softly Respiring in the Depths of Stifling Darkness" (重苦しい闇の奥で静かに呼吸(いき)づきながら, Omokurushii Yami no Oku de Shizukani Iki-zuki nagara); 31. "Sullied, Pure Gaze" (汚れて清いまなざし, Kegarete Kiyoi Manazashi); 32. "I Will Love You!" (愛してやろう！, Aishiteyarou!)
Police detectives visit Kasuga at his home and question him about the fire and the planner, but he denies involvement. His parents confront him about his activities and force him to stay home. Saeki visits him and tells him to turn himself in and stay in the town with her, but Kasuga rejects her advances. Saeki turns herself in to the police for setting the fire. Kinoshita tells the school about Kasuga's crimes. The school does not involve the police and tries to get him to admit that he was influenced by Nakamura. Kasuga's parents announce that they will be moving over the vacation. The night before the festival, Nakamura breaks into Kasuga's house, attacking his father, and the two escape. The next day, the two purchase disguises, a kitchen knife, kerosene, and a lighter. Meanwhile, Kasuga's mother, Nakamura's father, and Kinoshita search for them at the festival. Kasuga and Nakamura climb to the top of a float while wielding a knife.
7	December 7, 2012	978-4-06-384761-1	October 15, 2013	978-1-939130-00-6
33. "Happy Are They Who May Take Flight" (翔び立ち得る者は幸なり, Tobi Tachiuru Mono wa Kō nari); 34. "Precious Thoughts" (貴重な思い, Kichō na Omoi); 35. "While Yearning for Far-Off Skies" (遠つ空しのびつつ, Tō tsu Sora Shinobi tsutsu); 36. "Clinging to an Unfulfilled Dream" (見果てぬ夢に追いすがる, Mihatenu Yume ni Oisugaru); 37. "Shafts of Winter Sunlight" (冬の日ざしがさっと差込む, Fuyu no Hizashi ga Satto Sashikomu)
Kasuga and Nakamura pour kerosene on themselves and say their final words, cursing the town and themselves. Just before they immolate themselves, Nakamura pushes Kasuga over the railings of the float, but she is tackled by her father before she can burn herself. A few years later, Kasuga is going to high school in a new city and he finds that he still can't forget Nakamura. Kasuga finds his classmate Tokiwa looking at Les Fleurs du mal in a used bookstore and she offers to lend him a novel. The novel rekindles his love of books and she starts lending him novels frequently. One day she forgets to bring the novels so Kasuga goes with her to her house. He discovers that she is currently working on a novel. Before he can look at it, Koji, Tokiwa's boyfriend, shows up outside her house.
8	June 7, 2013	978-4-06-384872-4	January 7, 2014	978-1-939130-04-4
38. "The Name, Too, Forgotten Now" (今は名も忘られはてし, Ima wa Na mo Wasurare Hateshi); 39. "Summoned from the Abyss" (深淵より呼びぬ, Shin'en yori Yobinu); 40. "Tearing the Cosmos' Happy Harmony" (目出度い宇宙の調和を破る, Medetai Uchū no Chōwa o Yaburu); 41. "A Scent as Sweet as a Secret" (秘密のように甘い香を, Himitsu no Yō ni Amai Ka o); 42. "In Short, I Was Dead" (つまり、僕は死んでいた, Tsumari, Boku wa Shindeita)
Koji is initially suspicious of Kasuga but relaxes after seeing how timid he is. He invites him to come along with Tokiwa and him to their friends' hideout. Angry that Kasuga was the first guy that Tokiwa let into her room, Koji presses Kasuga on who he used to like, causing an argument between Koji and Tokiwa. Tokiwa admits to Kasuga that she feels empty and Kasuga sees a resemblance to Nakamura in her. Later, Kasuga reads her manuscript, and is brought to tears because he can identify with the protagonist. He encourages her to write the novel. On their way home, Kasuga encounters Saeki, and the two meet up for lunch the next day. Saeki questions Kasuga on why he isn't searching for Nakamura anymore and accuses him of using Tokiwa as a stand-in for her.
9	August 9, 2013	978-4-06-394923-0	April 22, 2014	978-1-939130-28-0
43. "That Was Your Soul" (あれは君の魂だもの, Are wa Kimi no Tamashii da mono); 44. "What My Sinful Heart Seeks" (罪深い僕の心が求めるのは, Tsumibukai Boku no Kokoro ga Motomeru no wa); 45. "You as Dear as the Night Sky" (夜の空ほど君恋しきよ, Yoru no Sora hodo Kimi Koishiki yo); 46. "O Fountain of Eternal Youth" (永遠の青春の泉よ, Eien no Seishun no Izumi yo); 47. "Soon Homeward Now" (今しも家路に帰るのだ, Imashimo Ieji ni Kaeru no Da)
Koji and Tokiwa make up and he apologizes to Kasuga. Saeki's words come back to Kasuga and cause him to doubt his relationship with Tokiwa, but he reminds himself that Nakamura is elsewhere now. Emboldened, he visits Tokiwa at her workplace and asks her to go out with him, saying that he will be the one to save her. She breaks up with Koji and accepts. After they go out for a while, Tokiwa proposes that they visit Kasuga's hometown, but Kasuga refuses. Kasuga's father receives a phone call that Kasuga's grandfather collapsed and is going to die soon. Kasuga decides to go back with him to their hometown.
10	January 9, 2014	978-4-06-394993-3	July 1, 2014	978-1-939130-66-2
48. "A Dear One's Remains Enshrouded" (愛する者の死骸(なきがら)が包まれている, Aisuru Mono no Nakigara ga Tsustumareteiru); 49. "Do You Know Anguish?" (君は知るか、懊悩を？, Kimi wa Shiru ka, Ōnō o?); 50. "Still I Have Not Forgotten" (僕はまだ忘れずにいる, Boku wa Mada Wasurezu ni Iru); 51. "In the Light of Thine Eyes" (そなたの瞳の光には, Sonata no Hitomi no Hikari ni wa); 52. "Have You Noticed" (君は気づいているか, Kimi wa Kizuiteiru ka)
Kasuga helps keep his grandfather company while he turns cold, but he misses his death. Kasuga's relatives blame him for their grandfather's death. Kasuga sees Kinoshita at the funeral and the two meet at a diner at night. Kinoshita tells him that she regrets being left behind by Saeki and being stuck in her town. Before she leaves, she gives Kasuga a note saying where Nakamura moved to. Tokiwa finishes her novel and asks Kasuga to read it, but he refuses and tells her about his past. Kasuga tells her that he wants to visit Nakamura so that he can put her in the past and be with Tokiwa. Tokiwa says that she will go with him. The couple takes the train to Tokawa Station in Chōshi, Chiba and finds the eatery owned by Nakamura's mother. They order a meal and Kasuga and Nakamura greet each other.
11	June 9, 2014	978-4-06-395116-5	October 14, 2014	978-1-941220-10-8
53. "To Know Whether the Sea Is Truly Generous and Kind" (海が果して寛容で親切だかを知るがため, Umi ga Hatashite Kan'yō de Shinsetsu da ka o Shiru ga Tame); 54. "In The Golden Sunset" (金色の夕ぐれに, Konjiki no Yūgure ni); 55. "Following Time's Passage" (時すぎてのち, Toki Sugite Nochi); 56. "We Are Those Who Wish" (僕らは願う者なのだ, Bokura wa Negau Mono na No Da); Final Chapter. "The Stuff of Our Souls" (われらが心を占めるのは, Warera ga Kokoro o Shimeru no wa)
At a nearby beach, Kasuga asks Nakamura why she shoved him off the float back then and Nakamura says she forgot. Kasuga roughhouses Nakamura and tells her that he is happy she didn't disappear. She punches him and the three play with each other. Later, Kasuga is now in college and re-reads Les Fleurs du mal, enjoying it. Tokiwa and him are still dating and she is working on another novel. Kasuga dreams about his future with her and about his friends reuniting with estranged loved ones. When he wakes up, Kasuga starts writing in his empty book. The final chapter shows the story from Nakamura's point of view with people depicted as scary black blobs and darkness threatening to seep into her until she meets Kasuga.
