= Sweet Poolside =

Japanese manga

- Cover of the first volume of manga.

スイートプールサイド (Suīto Pūrusaido)
- Manga
- Written by: Shūzō Oshimi
- Published by: Kodansha
- English publisher: NA: Kodansha USA
- Magazine: Weekly Young Magazine (2004); Bessatsu Shōnen Magazine (2011)
- Original run: 2004 (original); May 2011 – August 2011 (re-serialized)
- Volumes: 1
- Live-action film
- Directed by: Daigo Matsui
- Produced by: Toshihiro Takahashi
- Written by: Daigo Matsui
- Released: June 14, 2014
- Runtime: 103 minutes

Sweet Poolside (スイートプールサイド, Suīto Pūrusaido) is a Japanese manga written and illustrated by Shūzō Oshimi. It was first serialized in Kodansha's Weekly Young Magazine in 2004, and later re-serialized in Bessatsu Shōnen Magazine from May to August 2011.

It was adapted into a live action film that premiered theatrically in Japan on June 14, 2014. In March 2022, Kodansha USA announced they licensed the series for English publication, with the one compiled volume releasing on January 17, 2023.

== Plot ==
Toshihiko Ota (Kenta Suga) is a first year junior high school student. He is a member of the school's swimming club. He also suffers from not having enough body hair. Meanwhile, Ayako Goto (Yuiko Kariya) is also a fellow first year junior high student and member of the same swimming club. She suffers from having too much hair. She confides in Toshihiko Ota about her "hairy" problem. A relationship soon develops as Toshihiko begins to shave her arm and leg hair.

== Characters ==
- Toshihiko Ōta - Kenta Suga
- Ayako Gotō - Yuiko Kariya
- Mitsuhiko Ota (Toshihiko's older brother) - Shota Matsuda
- Satoko Hokuyu (Mitsuhiko's girlfriend) - Mitsuki Tanimura
- Teacher Takakura - Takayuki Kinoshita
- Shigeo Goto - Go Riju
- Senior Ninomiya - Motoki Ochiai
- Mai Sakashita - Moe Arai
- Taka Mimura - Taiga
- Senior Nakayama - Kai Inowaki
