= Sosuke Ikematsu =

Japanese actor (born 1990)

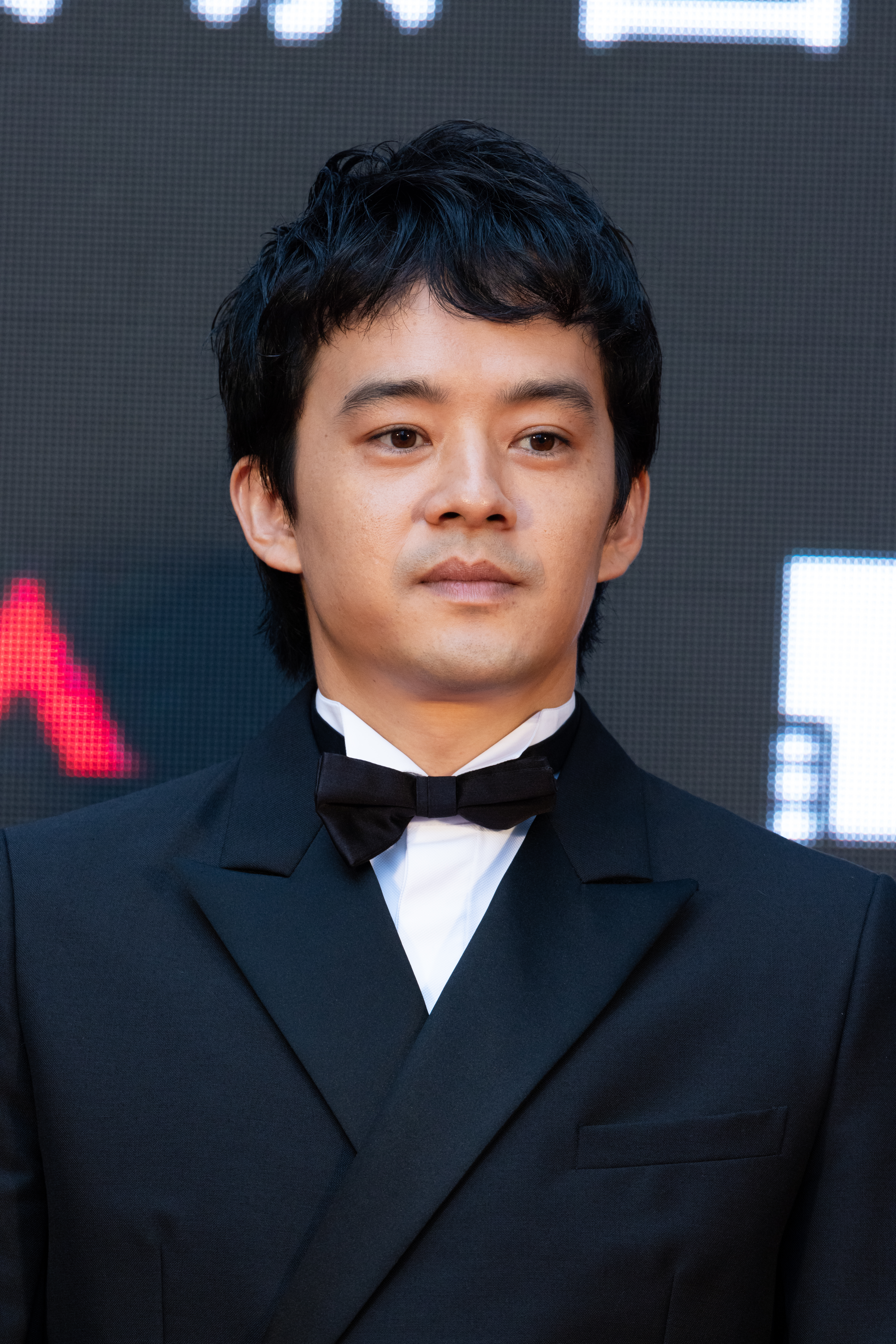
- Ikematsu at the 37th Tokyo International Film Festival in 2024
- Born: July 9, 1990 (age 35); Fukuoka, Japan
- Occupation: Actor
- Years active: 2001–present
- Known for: The Last Samurai
- Website: sosukeikematsu.info

Sosuke Ikematsu (池松 壮亮, Ikematsu Sōsuke) (born July 9, 1990) is a Japanese actor, television, and theatre actor best known for his role as Higen, the young nephew of samurai leader Katsumoto, in the 2003 film The Last Samurai.

== Life and career ==
Born in Fukuoka, Fukuoka Prefecture, Japan, on July 9, 1990, Ikematsu landed his first film role in the blockbuster hit The Last Samurai at the age of 13. He has since gone on to star in four feature-length films in Japan. Ikematsu graduated from Noma Junior High School in Minami-ku, Fukuoka City, Fukuoka in March 2006.

== Filmography ==
=== Film ===
- The Last Samurai (2003), Higen
- Tetsujin 28: The Movie (2005), Shōtarō
- Yamato (2005), Atsushi
- Udon, Shōta Mizusawa (2006)
- Yoru no Pikunikku (2006), Junya Sakaki
- Genghis Khan: To the Ends of the Earth and Sea (2007)
- Sand Chronicles (2008), Daigo Kitamura
- Dive!!, Yōichi (2008)
- Good Bye, My Secret Friend (2009), adult Yoshio
- Shin-san, Mamoru (2009)
- Looking Up at the Half Moon (2010), Yūichi
- Drucker in the Dug-Out (2011), Jirō
- Go! Boys' School Drama Club (2011), Kaji
- The Story of Yonosuke (2013)
- Love's Whirlpool (2014), Isamu (the NEET)
- Pale Moon (2014)
- The Vancouver Asahi (2014), Frank Nojima
- My Hawaiian Discovery (2014)
- Our Family (2014)
- Mozu (2015)
- Our Huff and Puff Journey (2015)
- A Cappella, Wataru Dōmoto (2016)
- The Shell Collector (2016)
- Destruction Babies (2016)
- After the Storm (2016)
- Somebody's Xylophone (2016)
- Seto & Utsumi, Utsumi (2016)
- Death Note: Light Up the New World (2016), Ryūzaki
- The Long Excuse (2016), Kishimoto
- The Tokyo Night Sky Is Always the Densest Shade of Blue (2017), Shinji
- Samurai's Promise (2018)
- You, Your, Yours (2018)
- Shoplifters (2018)
- Killing (2018)
- We Are Little Zombies (2019)
- Miyamoto (2019), Hiroshi Miyamoto
- Almost a Miracle (2019), Yōhei Yoshitaka
- A Girl Missing (2019), Kazumichi
- Talking the Pictures (2019), Buntarō Futagawa
- The Asian Angel (2021)
- 1921 (2021)
- Yanagawa (2021)
- Just Remembering, Teruo (2022)
- Shin Kamen Rider, Takeshi Hongo (2023)
- Okiku and the World (2023)
- Between the White Key and the Black Key (2023)
- Masked Hearts (2023)
- My Sunshine (2024), Arakawa
- Baby Assassins: Nice Days (2024), Kaede Fuyumura
- Documentary of Baby Assassins (2024), Himself
- The Real You (2024), Sakuya Ishikawa
- Gosh!! (2025)
- Ravens (2025), Shoda
- Frontline: Yokohama Bay (2025), Haruto Sanada
- The Secret Battlefield (2026), Yoichi Ujita

=== Television ===
- Yoshitsune (2005), young Minamoto no Yoritomo
- Shinsengumi!! Hijikata Toshizō Saigo no Ichi-nichi (2006), Ichimura Tetsunosuke
- Fūrin Kazan (2007), young Takeda Shingen and Suwa Katsuyori
- Inochi no Shima (2009), Tōru
- The Three Musketeers (2009-2010), D'Artagnan (voice)
- 15-sai no Shiganhei (2010), Masami Fujiyama
- Q10, Takehiko Kubo (2010)
- Tomehane! Suzuri Kōkō Shodōbu (2010), Yukari Ōe
- Mozu (2014), Shingai Kazuhiko
- Sherlock Holmes (2014-2015), Jack Stapleton (voice)
- Death Note: New Generation (2016), Ryūzaki
- Kindaichi Kosuke Tōjō! (2016), Kosuke Kindaichi (2016)
- Silver and Gold (2017), Tetsuo Morita
- The Supporting Actors (2017), Himself
- Miyamoto kara Kimi e (2018), Hiroshi Miyamoto
- Anata no Soba de Ashita ga Warau (2021)
- Bullets, Bones and Blocked Noses (2021), Ippei Aoba
- Modern Love Tokyo (2022)
- Crayon Shin-chan (2023), Takeshi Hongo (voice)
- The Hot Spot (2025), Yuma Kishimoto
- Simulation: Defeat in the Summer of 1941 (2025), Yoichi Ujita
- Brothers in Arms (2026), Toyotomi Hideyoshi

=== Video games ===
- Uncharted 3: Drake's Deception (2011, Japanese dub), young Nathan Drake

=== Stage ===
- The Lion King (2001), Young Simba
