= Creep Hyp =

Japanese rock band

Creep Hyp クリープハイプ
- Origin: Japan
- Genres: Indie Rock
- Years active: 2001-present
- Label: Universal Music Japan
- Members: Sekaikan Ozaki（Vocals・Guitar）; Yukichika Ogawa（Guitar）; Kaonashi Hasegawa（Bass・Chorus）; Taku Koizumi（Drums）
- Past members: Adachi（Bass）; Ichikawa（Drums）; Yuusaku Nijida（Bass）; Kazuki Mishiro（Drums）; Noriyuki Ooshiro（Drums）
- Website: Creep Hyp Official Website

YouTube information
- Channel: クリープハイプ
- Years active: 2018-present
- Genre: Music
- Subscribers: 457 thousand
- Views: 227.9 million
- Last updated: September 19, 2023

Creep Hyp discography
- Studio albums: 6
- Compilation albums: 1
- Singles: 11

Creep Hyp (クリープハイプ) is a Japanese rock band. They are affiliated with the agency Primitive. They are under the Universal Music Japan label. Their name can be abbreviated to "Creep クリープ".

== Members ==
=== Current members ===
- Sekaikan Ozaki (尾崎世界観, November 9, 1984 (age 41))
  Vocalist, guitarist.
  Born in Katsushika Ward, Tokyo, and graduated from Iwakura High School. The name "Sekaikan" is said to have come from an early live in 2005 where someone in the audience said "Sekaikan would make a good name". Before that, he went by the name Yuusuke Ozaki (尾崎祐介). In 2016 he debuted as an author with the semi-autobiographical novel titled "Yuusuke" (『祐介』) under the publishing company Bungei Shunju (文藝春秋).
- Yukichika Ogawa (小川 幸慈, September 19, 1984 (age 41))
  Guitarist.
  Yukichika likes coffee.
- Kaonashi Hasegawa (長谷川 カオナシ, September 23, 1987 (age 38))
  Bassist, chorus.
  The surname Hasegawa is not his real name. At the time of their debut, the members encouraged him to use his real name, but he insisted on using the name Kaonashi Hasegawa. He is also in charge of writing, composition, vocals, and violin for some songs.
- Taku Koizumi (小泉 拓, January 8, 1979 (age 47))
  Drummer.
  Graduated from the department of economics at Chuo University. He is the oldest member. In elementary school, he enjoyed playing the Taiko drums at a summer festival and began playing the drums from that point on.

=== Former members ===
- Yuusaka Nishida (西田 裕作)
  Left the band in 2008. Became a member of The Cheserasera after leaving.
- Kazuki Mishiro (美代 一貴)
  Left the band in 2008 and joined The Cheserasera along with Nishida.
- Noriyuki Ooshiro (オオシロ ノリユキ)
  Listed in the 1st mini album 『ねがいり』. Currently a member of the band Brown Envelope (茶封筒).
- Adachi (安達)
  Bassist. Listed on the back of the untitled cassette tape.
- Ichikawa (市川)
  Drummer. Listed on the back of the untitled cassette tape along with Adachi.

Some members have repeatedly joined and left the group while the details about some of the other members are unclear.

== History ==
- 2001 - Ozaki formed the three-piece band Creep Hyp with his local friends Adachi and Ichikawa.
- 2008 - The two members at the time (Nishida and Mishiro) left the group, and Ozaki became a one-man unit. Ozaki talked about this time in his semi-autobiographical novel "Yuusuke."
- 2009 - Ogawa, Hasegawa, and Koizumi joined and group activities began.
- 2011 - They began to be featured in music magazines, television shows, and on the radio.
- 2012 - On April 18, they made their major debut with the album『死ぬまで一生愛されてると思ってたよ』. This album won the 2013 CD Shop Grand Prize. On October 3, they released their 1st single, 「おやすみ泣き声、さよなら歌姫」. It debuted at number 7 on the weekly Oricon Chart.
- 2013 - On March 6, they released their 2nd single,「社会の窓」.The previous work ranked number 7 on the Oricon chart, with the self-deprecating title expressing their feelings towards their fans from before becoming a hot topic. This single debuted at number 10 on the weekly Oricon chart, making it their second consecutive work to make the top 10. On April 1, they released the supplementary book『信じていたのに嘘だったんだ』for their first album『死ぬまで一生愛されてると思ってたよ』. On May 1, they released their 3rd single,「憂、燦々」. The title song was used by Shiseido Anessa's 「You! Sun! Sun!」commercial. On July 24, they released their 2nd major album,『吹き零れる程のI、哀、愛』.This album won the 2014 CD Shop Grand Prize. This was their second work in two years to win this award. On October 9, the group released their first live DVD,『クリープハイプ、ツアーファイナル、中野サンプラザの窓』. On October 26, the movie『自分のことばかりで情けなくなるよ』, with original story by Ozaki and music by Creep Hyp, was released in theaters to the public. On December 18, the SMAP 51st single,「Shareotsu/Hello」, was released, containing the song 「Hello」 that was written and composed by Ozaki.
- 2014 - It was revealed that the best album,『クリープハイプ名作選』, was released on March 12 without informing the band or the agency, causing Creep Hyp to make an announcement on their official website. They used this as an opportunity to transfer from Victor Entertainment to Universal Music Japan. Currently, there is no information regarding the best album in the discography on their official website. On May 7, they released their 1st single under their new label,「寝癖」. This single debuted at number 5 on the weekly Oricon chart, becoming their highest ranking song to date. On July 23, they released the first double A-side single of their career,「エロ/二十九、三十」. On November 5, they released their 6th single,「百八円の恋」. The title song was written to be the theme song of the movie『100 Yen Love』, directed by Masaharu Take. It became the first single album since their major debut to not reach the top 10. On December 3, they released their 3rd album,『一つになれないなら、せめて二つだけでいよう』. This album debuted at number 9 on the weekly Oricon chart.
- 2015 - On May 5, they released their 7th single,「愛の点滅」. This single ranked number 2 on the daily Oricon chart and number 5 on the weekly Oricon chart.表The title song was written to be the theme song of the movie 『Nōnai Poison Berry』directed by Yuichi Sato. The band members acted as themselves and also provided the music for the movie『Our Huff and Puff Journey』which was released on September 12. On September 30, they released their 8th single,「リバーシブルー」. The coupling song「わすれもの」was written as the theme song for the aforementioned movie『Our Huff and Puff Journey』, and was also featured in the Myojo Foods commercial 「一平ちゃん夜店の焼きそば マヨンナ編」, starring Suzu Hirose.
- 2016 - On March 23, they released their 9th single,「破花」.The title song was written as the theme song to the Yoyogi Seminar「代ゼミ、合格改革。」edition. On June 30, Ozaki released his first novel『祐介』, in which he dramatized moments before their major debut in a semi-autobiographical style. On August 10, they released their 10th single,「鬼」.The title song was written as the theme song for the Nippon TV drama『Lost ID』. This was the first time they provided the theme song for a drama. On September 7, they released their 4th album,『世界観』. It debuted at number 4 on the weekly Oricon Chart, making it their highest ranking single album in two and a half years. The cover art is tied to the design of the novel『祐介』.
- 2017 - On February 22, they released the 5 song collection,「もうすぐ着くから待っててね」.This included the song「校庭の隅に二人、風が吹いて今なら言えるかな」written as the second opening theme for the TV anime『Ajin: Demi-Human』, the song 「Find my Tokyo.」, written for a commercial for the Tokyo Metro, and the collab song「陽」with vocalist Maguro Taniguchi (谷口鮪) from KANA-BOON. On April 26, they released their 11th single,「イト」. The title song was written as a theme song for the movie『Teiichi: Battle of Supreme High』starring Masaki Suda. On May 24, Ozaki's second work, an essay book titled 『苦汁100%』, was released. On May 31, the single 「NO SWALLOWS,NO LIFE.」, a collaboration with STUTS, was released exclusively at Tower Records.
