= Welcome Back, Alice =

Japanese manga series

- Cover art of the first volume

おかえりアリス (Okaeri Arisu)
- Genre: Romance
- Manga
- Written by: Shūzō Oshimi
- Published by: Kodansha
- English publisher: Kodansha USA
- Imprint: Shōnen Magazine Comics
- Magazine: Bessatsu Shōnen Magazine
- Original run: April 8, 2020 – August 9, 2023
- Volumes: 7

Welcome Back, Alice (Japanese: おかえりアリス, Hepburn: Okaeri Arisu) is a Japanese manga series written and illustrated by Shūzō Oshimi. It was serialized in Kodansha's Bessatsu Shōnen Magazine from April 2020 to August 2023, with its chapters collected in seven tankōbon volumes. This manga explores complexities that lie under gender identity and sex, covering explicitly honest experiences of teenage psychosexual development and how it affects our perception of the opposite sex. The course of this manga also involves honest ramblings in form of journals of the author, Oshimi's, experiences himself from his younger adolescence to early-adulthood times. The two main characters are Kei Murota and Yohei Kamekawa, whom Kei is close friends with since childhood and calls for strange encounters of intimacy revolving around their gender identity.

== Plot ==
Welcome Back, Alice is about a group of three friends, Yohei, Kei, and Yui, who are reunited in high school after Kei moves back to their town. What could have been a straightforward love triangle becomes complicated and dramatic when Kei shows up looking and deliberately dressing like a woman, with female school attire as well as long grown luscious hair. This predicament brings conflict and disagreements between the three as Yui has always had romantic feelings towards Kei, as Yohei is with Yui.

== Characters ==
Yohei Kamekawa (亀川 洋平, Kamekawa Yōhei)
A high school boy and the main character. Nicknamed "Yo".
Yui Mitani (三谷 結衣, Mitani Yui)
A girl who Yohei had a crush on as a child.
Kei Murota (室田 慧, Murota Kei)
The childhood friend of Yohei and Yui who comes back looking like a girl. Kei is very sexually blunt and forward. Kei says that they are no longer a boy, but does not state that they are or wish to be a woman.

== Production ==
Oshimi has stated that Welcome Back, Alice is about deconstructing male sexuality, with the author drawing from personal discomfort with manhood. The manga deals with adolescent sexual awakening, love and frustration among all three main characters, and the gender identity of the character Kei, as well as Yohei later in the story. Oshimi claims to have felt the need to begin an introspective journey through "the hell of sexuality" after reading Masahiro Morioka's Confessions of a Frigid Man, and that led to Welcome Back, Alice being conceived.

== Publication ==
Written and illustrated by Shūzō Oshimi, Welcome Back, Alice was serialized in Kodansha's shōnen manga magazine Bessatsu Shōnen Magazine from April 8, 2020, to August 9, 2023. Its chapters were collected in seven tankōbon volumes from October 9, 2020, to October 6, 2023. The manga is licensed in English by Kodansha USA.

No.	Original release date	Original ISBN	English release date	English ISBN
1	October 9, 2020	978-4-06-520593-8	June 7, 2022	978-1-64-729104-4
2	June 30, 2021	978-4-06-522889-0	June 28, 2022	978-1-64-729105-1
3	October 8, 2021	978-4-06-525135-5	August 16, 2022	978-1-64-729106-8
4	April 8, 2022	978-4-06-527533-7	January 17, 2023	978-1-64-729170-9
5	October 7, 2022	978-4-06-529409-3	September 12, 2023	978-1-64-729228-7
6	April 7, 2023	978-4-06-531233-9	March 19, 2024	978-1-64-729303-1
7	October 6, 2023	978-4-06-533148-4	August 20, 2024	978-1-64-729376-5

== Reception ==
Welcome Back, Alice has received both praise and criticism for its portrayal of gender non-conforming people. Chris Cimi, in a review of the first volume, praised the manga for not treating Kei's apparent transition like something odd and bizarre and taking an upfront approach, while at the same time wishing that Oshimi had "committed harder" to explicitly describing Kei as transgender or non-binary. Cimi also describes Welcome Back, Alice as feeling like a side project compared to Oshimi's other manga. Cimi also said that Oshimi's Inside Mari, despite its unrealistic premise, had a stronger impact.

Rebecca Silverman, writing for Anime News Network, criticized Oshimi's Kei as an amalgam of negative stereotypes about LGBTQIA people. Specifically, she describes Kei as seeming to want nothing more than to use his gender and sexuality to tease and torment his childhood friends. Jean-Karlo Lemus, also writing for ANN, stated that the manga deals with dark subjects, such as frustration and confusion, and their relationship with sexuality, as well as freedom from norms, and expressed interest in how the characters develop. He called Welcome Back, Alice a "masterful story".
