= Gō Rijū =

Japanese film director and actor (born 1962)

- Born: July 31, 1962 (age 64); Yokohama, Kanagawa, Japan
- Occupations: Actor, Film director
- Years active: 1981–present
- Parent: Mieko Osanai (mother)

Gō Rijū (利重 剛, Rijū Gō) is a Japanese film director and actor.

== Career ==
Rijū started making 8mm films in high school, and his Kyōkun I earned a spot at the 1980 Pia Film Festival. In 1981, he made his acting debut with a starring role in the TBS drama Fubo no gosan. The same year, he participated in the production of Kihachi Okamoto's At This Late Date, the Charleston, not only starring, but also co-authoring the script and serving as assistant director. As an actor, he has appeared in films directed by Juzo Itami, Yoichi Sai, Kaizo Hayashi, and Shinji Aoyama; as well as TV dramas such as Kinpachi-sensei and Hanzawa Naoki.

As a director, his film Elephant Song won the NETPAC Award at the 1995 Berlin International Film Festival. His next work Berlin (1995) earned him the Directors Guild of Japan New Directors Award. His 2001 film Chloe was also selected for competition at the Berlin International Film Festival.

== Filmography ==
=== As actor ===
==== Television ====
- Fubo no gosan (1981)
- Tokugawa Ieyasu (1983), Toyotomi Hideyori
- Kinpachi-sensei (2001–02)
- Fūrin Kazan (2007), Narita Nagayasu
- Drifting Net Cafe (2009)
- Clouds Over the Hill (2009–2011), Shin'ichirō Kurino
- Ryōmaden (2010), Maki Yasuomi
- Ariadne no Dangan (2011)
- Ataru (2012)
- Hanzawa Naoki (2013)
- In Hand (2019), Mikio Segawa
- A Warmed Up Love (2020), Seiichirō Tsuzuki
- The Supporting Actors 3 (2021), himself
- Hiru (2022)
- Gannibal (2022), Morobe Police Department Head
- Boogie Woogie (2023), Rintarō Ōbayashi

==== Film ====
- At This Late Date, the Charleston (1981)
- Mishima: A Life in Four Chapters (1985)
- Eureka (2000)
- KT (2002)
- Wandering Home (2010)
- The Edge of Sin (2015)
- Ice Cream and the Sound of Raindrops (2017)
- Last Winter, We Parted (2018)
- Family Bond (2020)
- True Mothers (2020), Hamano
- The Sound of Grass (2021)
- Haw (2022)
- Shin Ultraman (2022)
- Kamaishi Ramen Monogatari (2023)
- Shadow of Fire (2023)
- Great Absence (2024)
- Stolen Identity: Final Hacking Game (2024)
- Nagasaki: In the Shadow of the Flash (2025)
- Grandma's Secret (2026)
- Yakushima's Illusion (2026), Eizo
- Cry Out (2026)
- Rhapsody, Rhapsody (2026)
- The Mountain (2026)
- All That Exists (2027), Keisuke Tsuchiya

=== As director ===
- Elephant Song (1994)
- Berlin (1995)
- Chloe (2001)
- Good-bye Debussy (2013)
- Rhapsody, Rhapsody (2026)
