= Daily Lives of High School Boys =

Japanese manga series by Yasunobu Yamauchi

- Cover of the first manga volume released in Japan featuring Hidenori Tabata, Yoshitake Tanaka and Tadakun

男子高校生の日常 (Danshi Kōkōsei no Nichijō)
- Genre: Comedy, slice of life
- Manga
- Written by: Yasunobu Yamauchi
- Published by: Square Enix
- English publisher: NA: Vertical
- Magazine: Gangan Online
- Original run: May 21, 2009 – September 27, 2012
- Volumes: 7
- Anime television series
- Directed by: Shinji Takamatsu; Ai Yoshimura (assistant)
- Produced by: Kakeru Tanaka; Hiroaki Ōshiro; Yōhei Hayashi; Hiroshi Satō; Ryūta Wakanabe
- Written by: Shinji Takamatsu
- Music by: Audio Highs
- Studio: Sunrise
- Licensed by: AUS: Hanabee; NA: NIS America
- Original network: TV Tokyo, AT-X, Bandai Channel, TVA, TVO, Niconico
- English network: PH: Hero TV
- Original run: January 9, 2012 – March 26, 2012
- Episodes: 12 + 6 specials
- Live-action film
- Directed by: Daigo Matsui
- Produced by: Kazuhisa Ōhata; Yūsuke Wakabayashi
- Written by: Hiroyuki Omine; Daigo Matsui
- Music by: Yūta Mori; Micon Studio
- Studio: Showgate
- Released: October 12, 2013
- Runtime: 85 minutes

Daily Lives of High School Boys (Japanese: 男子高校生の日常, Hepburn: Danshi Kōkōsei no Nichijō) is a Japanese manga series written and illustrated by Yasunobu Yamauchi. The manga was serialized in Gangan Online and was released in seven manga volumes between May 21, 2009, and September 27, 2012. A twelve-episode anime series produced by Sunrise aired between January 9 and March 26, 2012. The anime was licensed by NIS America for release in North America and Hanabee Entertainment in Australia. A live-action film directed by Daigo Matsui was released by Showgate in Japan on October 12, 2013.

== Plot ==
The story revolves around the daily lives of three schoolboy friends; Tadakuni, Hidenori Tabata and Yoshitake Tanaka of Sanada North Boys High school and their various interactions with other students of and around their school and their coming of age endeavors.

== Characters ==
=== Main characters ===
Tadakuni (タダクニ, Tadakuni)
Voiced by: Miyu Irino
Actor: Masaki Suda
A student in Sanada North Boys High who acts as the straight man of the group. He is usually involved in Hidenori and Yoshitake's wild ideas despite his disapproval. He is good at telling "ghost" stories, though most of the time he makes them up. He has a younger sister whom he hardly talks to and is stronger than him and his friends. He also works part-time at a pizza restaurant. Despite being introduced like a main protagonist, he gets the fewest roles of the trio. In the anime, it is explained that he was there for most of the trio's adventures, but even though the show is about the daily lives of high school students, the editors only want the 'interesting' lives of high school students. He is cut to save time, and thus rarely appears throughout the second half of the series. His last name is never revealed.
Yoshitake Tanaka (田中 ヨシタケ, Tanaka Yoshitake)
Voiced by: Kenichi Suzumura
Actor: Shūhei Nomura
The dyed hair character of the main trio, he usually goes along with Hidenori's scheme much to Tadakuni's disapproval. He was Rubber Shooter in the past and had fought against Habara along with Yanagin and Karasawa in that identity. Rubber Shooter first appears in episode 5. Back in elementary school, he had many embarrassing moments that his friends had mistaken to be for Mitsuo. He has a violent sister who is a year older than him.
Hidenori Tabata (田畑 ヒデノリ, Tabata Hidenori)
Voiced by: Tomokazu Sugita
Actor: Ryo Yoshizawa
The glasses-wearing character of the main trio and also a student of Sanada North Boys High, he is the one that usually gets the group involved in his crazy schemes. He used to be bullied in the past until he was saved by Rubber Shooter. His older brother, Yūsuke used to be the ringleader of the group until he went off to college. He is also always the main target of literature girl.

=== Sanada North High School ===
Toshiyuki Karasawa (唐沢 としゆき, Karasawa Toshiyuki)
Voiced by: Yūki Ono
Actor: Taiga
Often referred to by his family name, he is a member of Sanada North High student council, he is stiff and kind but can act lecherously at times. He is also Habara's neighbour and is a target of Yanagin and Ikushima's harassments during the Funky High School Girls meetings, but he always has ways to deal with them. He also has a facial scar between his eyes that he got from the Archdemon when he was in elementary school, which he covers with a cap. Since then he has been fearful of Habara.
Motoharu (モトハル, Motoharu)
Voiced by: Daisuke Namikawa
A member of Sanada North High student council. He has an intimidating look that is often mistaken as a delinquent, although he is actually gentle and shy. He was bullied by his older sister since he was young, however he gives in and maintains a good relationship with her. Although his older sister usually cooks dinner for them, he can actually cook better than her, much to her envy.
President (会長, Kaichō)
Voiced by: Akira Ishida
Student Council President of Sanada North High. Despite his good looks and charisma, he is quite laid back and lets the Vice-President handle most of the everyday student council tasks. He initiates the link with the student council of Sanada East High, leading to his mutual rivalry and later admiration with Ringo. The Vice President sees him as a father figure of sorts.
Vice-President (副会長, Fukukaichō)
Voiced by: Hiroki Yasumoto
Actor: Akihiro Kakuta
Student Council Vice-President of Sanada North High. His dyed hair, tanned skin and old appearance are often mistaken for an old-time delinquent, but in reality he is kind and gentle. He did however used to be wild as his appearance suggests, but this changed after he was invited into the student council by the current President. He is actually a year younger than the other council members and he becomes President after they all graduate.
Mitsuo (ミツオくん, Mitsuo-kun)
Voiced by: Nobuhiko Okamoto
Actor: Koshiro Higashimukai
Classmate of the main cast and is prone to mishaps yet friendly most of the time. He once trains with Hidenori to get into the soccer team but ends up playing rugby as a regular. His classmates always talk about his embarrassing moments in school even though they are not always actually his.

=== Funky High School Girls ===
An alternative female version of the High School Boys, which is usually featured near the end of the episode. Some of them often appear in the regular show but without eyes like Tadakuni and Yoshitake's sister.
Yanagin (ヤナギン, Yanagin)
Voiced by: Yū Kobayashi
Actor: Mizuki Yamamoto
The bespectacled and tomboyish girl of the group. She is good academically and proficient in karate. Full of crazy ideas and prone to violent outbursts. She was once part of the elementary school's strongest warriors to fight against Archdemon. After the battle, she was selected to monitor Habara and ended up being friends with her until now. She attends Sanada Central High.
Ikushima (生島, Ikushima)
Voiced by: Chiwa Saitō
Actor: Toko Miura
The twin tails of the group and also a student of Sanada East Girls High. She usually goes along with Yanagin and her wild ideas.
Habara (羽原, Habara)
Voiced by: Yukana
Actor: Kasumi Yamaya
The most normal high school girl of the group but not quite so in the past. Back in elementary school she had a fearsome look and was a huge bully in the neighborhood, earning her the moniker Archdemon. She eventually mellowed out after the local elementary school's ten strongest warriors managed to fight her to a draw. She was also responsible for Karasawa's facial scar and seeks to make it up to him even though he is still scared of her. Even now, despite usually acting normal, she still thinks fighting needs no rules and should be to the death and would not hesitate to literally kill her friends with a rock if they challenged her. She attends Sanada West High and is acquainted with Yassan.

=== Other characters ===
Literature Girl (文学少女, Bungaku Shōjo) Yassan (やっさん, Yassan)
Voiced by: Yōko Hikasa
A beautiful and soft-spoken long haired girl from Sanada West High which is a novel writer who is usually seen at the river bank looking for people who might fit into the role of her novel. She seems to be interested in the trio, particularly Hidenori, who has the most encounters with her and amuses her with novelly lines the most (or at least, tries to). She is also extremely clumsy, over imaginative, and often making a fool of herself. Although her real name was never truly revealed, those who know her addressed her as Yassan.
Ringo (りんごちゃん, Ringo chan)
Voiced by: Aoi Yūki
Actor: Anri Okamoto
The Student Council President of Sanada East High. She is full of pride and has a short temper. But she can be a bit of an airhead, which leads her to getting easily tricked, like mistaking Karasawa's snoring for a cat's meow and standing on a step ladder in the Student Council room to connect an intentionally unplugged cable whilst the boys peeked at her panties. She becomes increasingly close with Sanada North High Student Council and hints at signs of feelings for the President, in spite of their initial hostility which had led to a street fight at the School Festival. She is actually popular and is usually hit on, much to her ignorance.
Tadakuni's younger sister (タダクニの妹, Tadakuni no Imōto)
Voiced by: Ayahi Takagaki
Actor: Sara Takatsuki
Addressed by Yoshitake's older sister as "Mei-chan". A girl who always appears faceless and loathes Tadakuni and his male friends, but is often caught eavesdropping on their conversations and apparently has absolute faith in her brother's honesty, as she takes whatever he says at face value. She acts violently towards her brother and his friends, though she favors Karasawa. She attends Sanada Central High.
Yoshitake's older sister (ヨシタケの姉, Yoshitake no Ane)
Voiced by: Ami Koshimizu
The faceless, short-haired sister of Yoshitake who does not get along with her brother. Strong and violent, she is the ringleader of the girls who shave off Motoharu's beard. She went to Sanada Central High before graduating half way through the show. She is also highly concerned about not getting a boyfriend. She has a crush on Hidenori's older brother, Yūsuke, who calls her "Tanaka".
Mino (ミノ, Mino)
Voiced by: Risa Hayamizu
Motoharu's older sister. She is always seen asking Motoharu what to have for dinner and usually cooks for her brother since their parents are not at home. She gets along well with Motoharu unlike most of the other siblings (even though she also loved to bully Motoharu in the past). She went to Sanada West High before graduating half way through the show.
Takahiro Matsumoto (松本 たかひろ, Matsumoto Takahiro)
Voiced by: Showtaro Morikubo
He is the classmate of Yassan. He also lives close to Habara's home and was bullied by Habara in elementary school. He often talks about girls with his classmates from Sanada West High
Nago (奈古, Nago)
Voiced by: Junko Minagawa
Fellow part-timer at the same pizza place that Tadakuni works for, she has a complex for her looks. When she takes off her glasses and opens her eyes wide, her reflection from a convex mirror makes her look like a completely different person. She goes to the same school as Yanagin and holds the position of number one grade-wise, while Yanagin is number two.
Yasunori (康典, Yasunori)
Another coworker of Tadakuni's at the pizza restaurant. He claims that he is pretty popular and, like Tadakuni, hopes to one day see the girl in the convex mirror one more time.
Yūsuke Tabata (田畑 ユウスケ, Tabata Yūsuke)
Voiced by: Takahiro Sakurai
The older brother of Hidenori and former leader of the main cast. Yoshitake's older sister, Tanaka, has a crush on him, but he prefers not to get close to her. He tries to set Tanaka up with one of his college friends, but has difficulty since almost all of them are perverts.
Mr. Tabata (田畑さん, Tabata-san)
Hidenori's father. Supposedly he wanted to be a pilot when he was young. He is pretty blunt and turns out to be just as thick headed as his two sons.
Yukana (由香奈, Yukana)
Voiced by: Madoka Yonezawa
A rich young lady that appears for a short sketch after the ED song of Episode 2. She has a crown tooth that her butlers (Nagase, Asano, and Toyogawa) are afraid will fall out.
Emi (絵美, Emi)
Voiced by: Kaori Mizuhashi
A girl with tanned skin who met Hidenori during a summer when he went to visit his grandparents. She spent the summer hanging out with Hidenori and Kiyohiko and developed feelings for Hidenori. Just before she was going to confess her feelings, Hidenori revealed that, unbeknownst to her, they are actually cousins.
Kiyohiko (清彦, Kiyohiko)
Voiced by: Yūichi Iguchi
Emi's childhood friend who lives next door to her.
Kiyotaka (清隆, Kiyotaka)
Voiced by: Jun Fukuyama
An old friend of Hidenori and Tadakuni. He currently goes to Chuuou High School.
Principal (校長, Kōchō)
The principal of Sanada North High is a very nice old man who refuses to turn his students away even if he does not know the answer to their questions.
Nameless Characters
Some recurring characters do not have names, like the Funky High School girls' senpai who tries but ultimately fails to make Yanagin and Ikushima to be cute; Yassan's classmate who enjoys rejecting guys on the train (and also ends up accidentally thinking at one point or another that each member of the main trio likes her); Mitsuo and Motoharu's two fellow classmates/close friends, and avid video game fans, who they have (as well as Hidenori and Yoshitake) known since elementary school; Takahiro's closest friend who talks to him about girls; The main trio's sensei; and Ringo-chan's fellow council members.

== Media ==
=== Manga ===
The manga was first published by Square Enix in the web magazine Gangan Online on May 21, 2009, and ended its run on September 27, 2012. It was later compiled into seven tankōbon volumes and published between February 22, 2010 and September 27, 2012. The ending is different from the anime. The manga received the Encouragement Award and the Special Jury Prize at the Square Enix Manga Award.

==== Volume list ====
No.	Original release date	Original ISBN	English release date	English ISBN
1	February 22, 2010	9784757528062	August 4, 2020	9781949980219
2	June 22, 2010	9784757529052	October 10, 2020	9781949980431
3	October 22, 2010	9784757530317	December 22, 2020	9781949980806
4	April 22, 2011	9784757531994	February 16, 2021	9781949980813
5	December 22, 2011	9784757534445	May 4, 2021	9781949980820
6	May 22, 2012	9784757535930	June 22, 2021	9781647290016
7	September 27, 2012	9784757538153	September 21, 2021	9781647290085

=== Anime ===
An anime adaptation produced by Sunrise and directed by Shinji Takamatsu was announced in October 2011 and premiered on TV Tokyo on January 9, 2012. This was followed by later airings on AT-X, Bandai Channel, TVA, TVO and online streaming on Niconico. The series was later released on six Blu-ray and DVD volumes in Japan between April 3 and September 4, 2012, and included special bonus episodes along with the episodes that were streamed on Niconico prior to the television premiere of the anime. The series was also licensed by NIS America. The company released the series in its entirety with English subtitles on a two-disc Blu-ray premium edition package on August 6, 2013. Hanabee Entertainment also announced that they had licensed the anime for release in Australia. This was followed by a DVD release on July 31, 2013. Hulu eventually picked the series up for online streaming in the United States in 2013. Funimation added the series to their catalogue via a partnership with NIS America on April 15, 2021, for USA, Canada, UK & Ireland.

Daily Lives of High School Boys uses three pieces of theme music: one insert song, one opening theme and one closing theme. The insert song is "Capsule" by Mix Speaker's,Inc. and was used in episode three. The main opening theme for all episodes is "Shiny tale" by Mix Speaker's,Inc. while the ending theme is "O-hi-sama" (おひさま; lit. 'Sun') by Amesaki Annainin. The original ending theme was supposed to be "Hikizan" (引き算; lit. 'Subtraction') by Jinkaku Radio. However the song was quickly pulled after the band made inappropriate remarks concerning the series on their blog which poked fun at the manga, stating "About that Daily Lives of High School Boys thing ... the manga is actually pretty boring (lol)". The band's lead vocalist had also previously posted inappropriate remarks about voice actress Yui Horie. This later prompted an apology by Jinkaku Radio—vowing to show more "self-restraint" on social media along with cancellation of the sales of "Subtraction" and other scheduled events.

==== Drama CD ====
There are six volumes of Drama CD released. The title is ''Unseen Daily Lives of High School Boys'' (Danshi Kōkōsei no Miserarenai Nichijō). These are some random gags and other stories.

=== Live-action film ===
A live-action film adaptation produced by Showgate and directed by Daigo Matsui was announced in April 2013 and released on October 12, 2013. The cast includes Masaki Suda as Tadakuni, Shūhei Nomura as Yoshitake and Ryo Yoshizawa as Hidenori. The film follows an original story with the boys of Sanada North holding a joint school festival with the neighboring all-girls high school. Director Matsui remarked that he had spent his high school years in an all-boys school himself and identified with the Daily Lives so much that he began looking at the boys' logic objectively. This made him feel "sad and embarrassed" and felt as though he made a documentary of his own life at the end of filming. The film was released by Pony Canyon on Blu-ray and DVD in Japan on March 19, 2014.

== See also ==
- List of Square Enix manga franchises
