= Drifting Net Cafe =

Japanese manga series

- Cover from volume 1 of the manga series Drifting Net Cafe, published by Futabasha

漂流ネットカフェ (Hyōryū Netto Kafe)
- Genre: Science fiction, mystery, romance
- Manga
- Written by: Shūzō Oshimi
- Published by: Futabasha
- Imprint: Action Comics
- Magazine: Manga Action
- Original run: February 28, 2009 – June 28, 2011
- Volumes: 7
- Television drama
- Directed by: Hajime Takezono; Takashi Fujio
- Original network: TBS / MBS
- Original run: April 15, 2009 – June 24, 2009
- Episodes: 11

Drifting Net Cafe (漂流ネットカフェ, Hyōryū Netto Kafe) is a Japanese seinen manga illustrated and written by Shūzō Oshimi that was serialized in the manga magazine, Manga Action. Drifting Net Cafe is a science fiction mystery involving a group of patrons trapped in an internet café, which has become a strange universe of its own. The story focuses primarily on the relationship between Koichi Toki, a salaryman who leads a trouble-free but unexciting life, and Kaho Tono, his first love whom he never forgot. Like many of Oshimi's works, the plot and message of this manga reflects the author's unforgettable experiences of his own, particularly with his first love. Drifting Net Cafe also explores themes such as morality around human instinctive behavior, and features explicit themes.

The manga was adapted into a TBS television series on April 15, 2009, and stars Atsushi Itō as Koichi Toki.

== Plot ==
Koichi Toki is an office worker or salaryman with a wife. He works hard to bring food home and leads a rather simple and boring life. During a work trip, he decides to spend time in an internet cafe, where he meets an ex-schoolmate after not seeing each other for a while. In the same cafe, several clients begin to have problems with their computers and the cellular signal disappears. The group of clients together with the manager of the place, Toki and his partner are trapped, to discover that they are in a mysterious place that is not Japan. The group suffers from disagreements, several escalations of anger and despair trying to survive while Toki and his friend's relationship progresses little by little.

== Manga ==
The manga was serialized in Futabasha's Manga Action and the 63 chapters were compiled into 7 volumes from February 28, 2009 to June 28, 2011. The defunct American publisher JManga licensed the manga and released the first volume in August 2011. The name of the manga is a reference to Kazuo Umezu's The Drifting Classroom, which it is a retelling of. The manga has also been published in Spain by Milky Way Ediciones.

== Television series ==
The series was released in a 4-disc DVD boxset on August 5, 2009. The ending theme「Brave Heart (Remix)」by MAY'S was released as a single on April 22, 2009.

=== Cast ===
- Atsushi Itō – Koichi Toki
- KIKI – Kaho Tono
- Reina Asami – Yukie Toki
- Shinpei Takagi – Atsushi
- Masahiro Toda – Osawa
- Mai Takahashi – Kazumi Kato
- Takahiro Hojo – Takashi Matsuda
- Reo Yoshitake – Kameda
- Kazumi Urano – Miku
- Hidekazu Nagae – Terasawa
- Yuko Mano – Sachiko Imai
- Go Riju – Kensuke Kajimachi
- Miyu Watanabe – Saori Mizuno
- Shusuke Tsumura – Satomura

=== Episodes ===
| File | On Air (Kansai Time) | On Air (Kanto Time) | Subtitle | Ratings (Kansai) | Ratings (Kanto) |
|---|---|---|---|---|---|
| 1 | Apr 10, 2009; 00:00–00:30 | Apr 15, 2009; 00:44–01:14 | Drift (漂流) | 5.0 | 3.3 |
| 2 | Apr 17, 2009; 00:15–00:45 | Apr 22, 2009; 00:29–00:59 | To a Forest (森へ) | 3.9 | 3.4 |
| 3 | Apr 24, 2009; 00:00–00:30 | Apr 29, 2009; 00:29–00:59 | Tom Sawyer (トムソーヤ) | 2.9 | 3.7 |
| 4 | May 1, 2009; 00:00–00:30 | May 6, 2009; 00:29–00:59 | Toki & Tono (土岐と遠野) | 4.7 | 2.0 |
| 5 | May 8, 2009; 00:00–00:30 | May 13, 2009; 00:29–00:59 | Seeds of Hope (希望の種) | | 2.7 |
| 6 | May 15, 2009; 00:00–00:30 | May 20, 2009; 00:29–00:59 | Dead World (死んだ世界) | 3.4 | 2.5 |
| 7 | May 22, 2009; 00:00–00:30 | May 27, 2009; 01:09–01:39 | Crack (亀裂) | 3.0 | 1.7 |
| 8 | May 29, 2009; 00:00–00:30 | June 3, 2009; 00:29–00:59 | Experimental (実験) | 3.5 | 2.5 |
| 9 | June 5, 2009; 00:00–00:30 | June 10, 2009; 00:29–00:59 | McEnroe (マッケンロー) | 4.4 | 2.1 |
| 10 | June 12, 2009; 00:00–00:30 | June 17, 2009; 00:29–00:59 | End of the World (世界の終わり) | | 2.7 |
| Final (11) | June 19, 2009; 00:00–00:30 | June 24, 2009; 00:29–00:59 | I'm Home (ただいま) | | 2.0 |

=== Special Rerun ===
| File | On Air (Kansai Time) | Ratings (Kansai) |
|---|---|---|
| 1 | Aug 11, 2009; 13:53–14:55 | 3.3 |
| 2 | Aug 12, 2009; 13:53–14:55 | 2.6 |
| 3 | Aug 13, 2009; 13:53–14:55 | 3.2 |
| 4 | Aug 17, 2009; 13:53–14:55 | 3.0 |

== Reception ==
Katherine Dacey of Manga Bookshelf was disappointed in how the first volume of the manga stood in comparison to The Drifting Classroom, saying the horror was not as well-executed, but felt that the manga had better pacing and artwork: "Long-time fans of Classroom are likely to find Oshimi's update slick but soulless, as it relies more heavily on low-budget disaster movies than the original source material for its characters and conflicts." Sean Gaffney of A Case Suitable for Treatment felt that the horror aspect was pulled off well in the first volume, but was turned off by the excessive violence and sex: "It's as sordid as it sounds, and made me feel ill... [It] didn't take long for morality to erode, much like [The Drifting Classroom]."
