= Hiroshi Nagahama =

Japanese animator and director (born 1970)

- 長濱博史
- Born: March 15, 1970 (age 56); Saiki, Ōita
- Education: Tokyo Designer Gakuin College
- Occupations: Animator; animation director; storyboard artist
- Years active: 1990–present

Hiroshi Nagahama (Japanese: 長濱 博史, Hepburn: Nagahama Hiroshi; born March 15, 1970) is a Japanese animator and director. He is best known for directing Mushishi.

== Career ==
Hiroshi Nagahama started his career at Madhouse Studio as a mechanical designer for The Cockpit, and was also a part of the production staff for Azuki-chan and Yawara!. After leaving Madhouse Studio, he became a freelancer and worked on the conceptual design for the Revolutionary Girl Utena series. He has also worked as the storyboard writer and animation director for Sexy Commando Gaiden: Sugoiyo! Masaru-san and Ojarumaru. Nagahama has been involved with the production of Doraemon: Nobita and the Windmasters, Pokémon Heroes, Fruits Basket, Kimi ni Todoke, and X-Men. He directed the highly acclaimed Mushishi, Detroit Metal City, The Flowers of Evil and Hatsune Miku music videos "Downloader" and "Chime".

== Filmography ==
=== As director ===
- Jubei-chan 2: Siberia Yagyuu no Gyakushuu (2004)
- Mushishi (2005)
- Detroit Metal City (2009)
- The Flowers of Evil (2013)
- Mushishi -Next Passage- (2014)
- Mushishi -Next Passage-: Path of Thorns (2014)
- Mushishi -Next Passage-: Bell Droplets (2015)
- The Reflection (2017)
- Uzumaki (2024, episode 1)

Episode director

- Fruits Basket (2001) (episodes 18 and 25)
- Gag Manga Biyori 2 (2006)
- School Rumble (2004) (episode 3)
