= You, Your, Yours =

- DVD cover
- Directed by: Daigo Matsui
- Screenplay by: Daigo Matsui
- Produced by: Ayako Hinohara; Kotaro Abe; Gaku Kawasaki; Koji Harada
- Starring: Sosuke Ikematsu; Kim Kkot-bi; Shinnosuke Mitsushima; Koji Ookura
- Cinematography: Hiroki Shioya
- Edited by: Elizabeth Miyaji
- Production company: T-JOY
- Release date: July 7, 2018 (Japan)
- Running time: 104 minutes
- Country: Japan
- Language: Japanese

You, Your, Yours (Japanese: 君が君で君だ, Hepburn: Kimi ga Kimi de Kimi da) is a 2018 Japanese independent romantic drama film directed by Daigo Matsui. It was released in Japanese cinemas on July 7, 2018 by T-Joy.

== Plot ==
The story follows three men that all fall in love with the same woman. The men, in hope of securing the love of the woman, change themselves to be whom their love admires. The men become Japanese musician Yutaka Ozaki (1965–1992), American actor Brad Pitt (1963) and a controversial Japanese historical figure Sakamoto Ryōma (1836–1867).

== Cast ==
- Sosuke Ikematsu as Yutaka Ozaki
- Kim Kkot-bi as a princess
- Shinnosuke Mitsushima as Brad Pitt
- Koji Ookura as Sakamoto Ryōma
- Mahiro Takasugi
- Osamu Mukai
