= Happiness (manga) =

Japanese manga series

- First tankōbon volume cover

ハピネス (Hapinesu)
- Genre: Dark fantasy; Supernatural
- Manga
- Written by: Shūzō Oshimi
- Published by: Kodansha
- English publisher: NA: Kodansha USA
- Imprint: Shōnen Magazine Comics
- Magazine: Bessatsu Shōnen Magazine
- Original run: 9 February 2015 – 9 March 2019
- Volumes: 10
- icon

Happiness (Japanese: ハピネス, Hepburn: Hapinesu) is a Japanese manga series written and illustrated by Shūzō Oshimi. It was serialized in Kodansha's shōnen manga magazine Bessatsu Shōnen Magazine from February 2015 to March 2019, with its chapters collected in ten tankōbon volumes. The manga was licensed for an English release in North America by Kodansha USA.

== Publication ==
Written and illustrated by Shūzō Oshimi, Happiness was serialized in Kodansha's shōnen manga magazine Bessatsu Shōnen Magazine from 9 February 2015 to 9 March 2019. Kodansha collected its chapters in ten tankōbon volumes, released from 9 July 2015 to 9 May 2019.

Kodansha USA announced that it had licensed the manga at their panel at Anime Central on 21 May 2016. The ten volumes were released from 27 September 2016 to 24 December 2019.

=== Volumes ===
No.	Original release date	Original ISBN	English release date	English ISBN
1	9 July 2015	978-4-06-395444-9	27 September 2016	9781632363633
1. "Stray" (ノラ, Nora); 2. "The Scent of Blood" (血(ち)のにおい, Chi no Nioi); 3. "Complications" (葛(かっ)藤(とう), Kattō); 4. "Nightwalking" (夜(よる)歩(あるく), Yoru Aruku); 5. "Payback" (代(だい)償(しょう), Daishō)
Makoto Okazaki is the errand boy in his class for Yuuki and his friends, and is befriended by Nunota, who previously held the position. One night, while going to return a DVD rental, Okazaki is attacked by a female vampire, who sucks his blood. When she asks him whether he wants to die or be like her, Okazaki responds that he wants to live and wakes up in the hospital. When he returns to class, Okazaki starts feeling nauseous and bloodthirsty, and refuses Yuuki's order to get food, punching him in the nose. When Okazaki has another episode in class, he retreats to a distant part of the school building and is calmed down by a girl named Yukiko Gosho. Gosho and him become friends and start eating lunch together. One night while biking to the rental store, Okazaki sees Yuuki, who became ridiculed and distant after getting punched, being bullied by a gang of upperclassmen. Yuuki's girlfriend Nao Shiraishi asks Okazaki for help and he reluctantly agrees. When he finds Yuuki in the park getting punched, Okazaki lunges on one of them, driving them away. Yuuki shows his gratefulness by buying him a can of coffee.
2	9 December 2015	978-4-06-395553-8	29 November 2016	9781632363640
6. "The Two Couples" (二(ふた)組(くみ), Futagumi); 7. "Forged in Blood" (血(けつ)沫(まつ), Ketsu Matsu); 8. "Cries and Shouts" (咆(ほう)哮(こう), Hōkō); 9. "Darkness" (暗(くら)闇(やみ), Kurayami); 10. "Saku" (サク, Saku)
Okazaki and Gosho hang out along with Yuuki and Shiraishi, and they become closer. One night after going to Yuuki's house with Shiraishi, Okazaki gets a call from Nunota. When Okazaki meets him, he discovers that Nunota was coerced into setting him up for an ambush by the gang. While beating Okazaki up, the gang calls Yuuki, who rushes to his aid. When a drop of blood enters Okazaki's mouth while he tries to retaliate, he enters a frenzied state and sends a signal to a male vampire named Saku. Saku attacks the gang and as he tries to kill Okazaki, is hit with a cinderblock by Yuuki. When Saku bites Yuuki's neck, the blood gushes into Okazaki's mouth, who swallows it. Everyone involved in the incident goes missing except for Okazaki, who is hospitalized. After five days, a worried Gosho and Shiraishi learn which hospital he was admitted to and visit him. Okazaki promises to find Yuuki, but renounces his previous life, trying to cut ties with the girls. Saku later locates Okazaki and reveals that he hid the bodies of those he attacked in a rooftop water tank. When Saku tries to kill Okazaki by dangling him in front of an oncoming train, Okazaki is saved by the woman who had attacked him, named Nora, and Saku is dismembered.
3	9 May 2016	978-4-06-395665-8	14 February 2017	9781632363923
11. "Yuuki" (勇(ゆう)樹(き), Yūki); 12. "Beyond the Pale" (化(け)外(がい), Kegai); 13. "The Bedroom" (寝(ね)床(どこ), Nedoko); 14. "Detected" (発(はっ)覚(かく), Hakkaku); 15. "Intersection" (交(こう)差(さ), Kōsa)
Okazaki locates Yuuki by the scent of his blood and saves him. Yuuki is hospitalized, but having been bit, becomes bloodthirsty. Gosho visits Okazaki and makes him confide in her, saying that he looks like her deceased brother who she could not help. At night, Makoto is called by Nora and she asks him to go away with her, sharing some blood she drank with him. When Yuuki's mother visits him, he sucks her blood and kills her. Agents who know Okazaki's secret try to take him from his house, but he is saved by Yuuki. Yuuki tells him that they have to run away, but Okazaki visits Nora with him to ask for help.
4	7 October 2016	978-4-06-395773-0	25 April 2017	9781632363930
16. "Separation" (別(べつ)離(り), Betsuri); 17. "Nao" (菜(な)緒(お), Nao); 18. "Sister and Brother" (姉(きょう)弟(だい), Kyōdai); 19. "The Parting" (決(けつ)別(べつ), Ketsubetsu); 20. "Such Sweet Sorrow" (惜(せき)別(べつ), Sekibetsu)
Nora viciously attacks Yuuki, saying that he has a "deep, black scent". Yuuki finds refuge at Shiraishi's house, where they have sex. Gosho visits the crime scene where Okazaki was ambushed and meets Masami Sakurane. Sakurane is searching for the vampires and relates to Gosho his failure to save his little sister from one, pledging to help her find Okazaki. Shiraishi's parents discover her having sex and Yuuki kills the whole family. As Okazaki leaves with Nora, they find themselves surrounded by armed agents.
5	9 March 2017	978-4-06-395879-9	18 July 2017	9781632364333
21. "Blood Flower" (血(ち)花(はな), Chi Hana); 22. "Allies" (味(み)方(かた), Mikata); 23. "The Two of Them" (二人(ふたり), Futari); 24. "Escape" (脱(だっ)出(しゅつ), Dasshutsu); 25. "An Old Scar" (古(ふる)傷(きず), Furukizu)
The agents open fire on them and Nora shields Okazaki. Enraged, Okazaki tries to retaliate, but is subdued. Gosho receives a call from a despondent Yuuki and meets up with Sakurane to see him. Sakurane offers to shelter Yuuki, but Gosho wants him to take responsibility for his murders. At Sakurane's apartment, when Gosho tries to push the point again and is rebuked by Sakurane, she realizes that Sakurane is a serial killer and runs. Sakurane stops her and slits her throat, leaving her in the burning apartment. When she regains consciousness, Gosho lacks strength until she hears Okazaki's voice in her head and manages to survive. Okazaki wakes up restrained in a lab and the agents start experimenting on him. Ten years later, Gosho is working at an office and attends a farewell party for a coworker. At the party, her scarf ends up getting taken off, revealing the scar on her neck. When her coworker Sudo tries to show her too much sympathy afterwards, she bluntly rejects him.
6	8 September 2017	978-4-06-510180-3	19 December 2017	9781632364838
26. "Sakurane" (桜(さくら)根(ね), Sakurane); 27. "A Wounded Heart" (心(しん)傷(しょう), Shinshō); 28. "Reunion" (再(さい)会(かい), Saikai); 29. "Looking Back" (回(かい)視(し), Kaishi); 30. "Discovery" (特(とく)定(てい), Tokutei)
One day while leaving work together with Sudo, Gosho has an impromptu hanami session at a park with him and the two get to know each other better. The next day, Gosho learns from a magazine cover that Sakurane was found in a commune in the mountains, and she has a nervous breakdown. After Gosho does not come to work for a week, Sudo visits her house and she says she is unable to make herself go outside. The next morning, Sudo helps her leave for work, with her clinging to his shirtsleeve. After three months being accompanied to and from work, Gosho recovers, and Sudo requests a date. Near the end of their date, Gosho visits her old high school, as well as the location of Nao's house. There, Okazaki's mom encounters them and invites them to her home, imparting advice to Gosho to live her own life. After Sudo and Gosho part at the train station, Gosho catches a glimpse of Okazaki. Gosho does not come to work for the next three days, telling Sudo she is sick, but when he calls her mother, she says that Gosho went on vacation. When Sudo visits her mother and finds material on Sakurane, she tells him about Gosho's past. Sudo rents a car and sets off for the commune near Miyagi Prefecture. Gosho calls Sudo, and despite his attempts to dissuade her, says that she must visit Sakurane because Okazaki and Yuuki could be there.
7	9 January 2018	978-4-06-510718-8	8 May 2018	9781632365521
31. "The Group" (教(きょう)団(だん), Kyōdan); 32. "The Holy Communion" (聖(せい)餐(さん), Seisan); 33. "The Ritual" (祭(さい)祀(し), Saishi); 34. "Kiyoshi" (清(きよ)史(し), Kiyoshi); 35. "Heartlessness" (酷(こく)悪(あく), Kokuaku)
Gosho sneaks into the commune—a cult called Blood of Happiness—at night, drawn to its church and the basement. She is accosted by angry inhabitants, who suspect her of being with media, but Sakurane—their leader—appears and welcomes her as a guest. The next morning, she meets Sakurane and he admits to her at knifepoint that both Okazaki and Yuuki are in the basement. She attends their assembly, where everyone is wearing hoods and chanting, and Sakurane makes her give a blood offering into a chalice to their "gods". He takes her into the basement, where she finds an unresponsive Yuuki in a cell, and Sakurane feeds him the blood. Sakurane threatens to slit Gosho's throat to attempt to rouse Yuuki, but he does no react, and Sakurane locks her in with him to try to get him to talk. Over the course of five days, Sakurane increasingly cuts and tortures her when he does not get results. Kiyoshi—a boy in the commune who takes an interest in Gosho—runs into Sudo sneaking around at night. Sudo supplicates for Gosho's whereabouts, but when he calls Sakurane a killer, Kiyoshi alerts others and Sudo is knocked unconscious. When he comes to, he demands to see Gosho and Sakurane takes him to the church. When he sees Gosho's state, Sudo becomes enraged and charges at Sakurane, who draws a knife.
8	8 June 2018	978-4-06-511569-5	6 November 2018	9781632366696
36. "Sudo" (須(す)藤(どう), Sudō); 37. "The Burning Desire" (宿(しゅく)願(がん), Shukugan); 38. "A Chance Meeting" (邂(かい)逅(こう), Kaikō); 39. "Convergence" (交(こう)錯(さく), Kōsaku); 40. "The Switch" (転(てん)換(かん), Tenkan)
Sudo beats Sakurane unconscious after a brief struggle and tries to escape with Gosho. Sakurane recovers and stabs Sudo, and forces Gosho to stab him as well. Before he can slit her neck, the now-responsive Yuuki knocks Sakurane out. Yuuki, hailed as a "god" by the cult, commands them to save the pair. That night, the villagers beseech Yuuki to turn them into gods. Sakurane, unconscious in the basement, flashbacks to his childhood where he recounts Nora turning his sister into a vampire. The experience led him to develop an obsession for Nora, who he calls a god. He begins a spree of murdering young girls before getting caught by the police. After serving time in prison, he devotes his life to tracking Nora and eventually meets Gosho. He awakens from his dream and meets with the villagers and Yuuki. After failing to get Yuuki to bite him, he instructs the villagers to eat Yuuki, who calls out to Okazaki.
9	8 November 2018	978-4-06-513393-4	18 June 2019	9781632367945
41. "Regeneration" (再(さい)生(せい), Saisei); 42. "Human Beings" (人(にん)間(げん), Ningen); 43. "God" (神(かみ)様(さま), Kamisama); 44. "That" (似(え)非(せ), Ese); 45. "Determination" (決(けつ)意(い), Ketsui)
A partially regenerated Saku kills the facility's guards and frees Okazaki. The pair find a dismembered Nora and take her conscious brain before escaping. Saku is shot by agents and voluntarily leaves himself behind for Okazaki to escape. Meanwhile, Gosho fails to escape as Sakurane and the cult members eat Yuuki's body and claim to ascend as vampires. After realizing he still cannot drink blood, Sakurane tries to kill Gosho. Okazaki, who is tracking Yuuki's voice, arrives in time to save Gosho. Sakurane pleads for Okazaki to turn him to a vampire. After hearing Yuuki requesting Sakurane to be killed, Okazaki bites him in the neck.
10	9 May 2019	978-4-06-514872-3	24 December 2019	9781632368386
46. "Final Fates" (末(まつ)路(ろ), Matsuro); 47. "The Course of Events" (空(そら)合(あい), Soraai); 48. "Afterwards" (其(それ)後(から), Sorekara); 49. "Happiness" (幸(ハピ)福(ネス), Hapinesu); 50. "Forget Me Not" (勿(わす)忘(れな), Wasurena)
Contrary to his belief, Sakurane does not become a vampire and dies from the trauma of Okazaki's bite. Okazaki rescues Gosho as the cult members follow Sakurane by performing a mass suicide. In a dream, Okazaki bids farewell to Gosho for good. Gosho wakes up in a hospital with Sudo and Kiyoshi, both of whom were also rescued by Okazaki. In a flashforward five years later, Okazaki's family posthumously celebrates his 30th birthday. Sudo supports Gosho, now his wife, in the delivery room, where she delivers a boy. Okazaki continues to hunt by nonlethally extracting blood from victims and feeding it to both himself and Nora, who has partially regenerated. In another flashforward several decades to the future, Okazaki helps Saku escape the facility. Kiyoshi now works a normal job in a factory. Okazaki's brother mourns the death of their parents. An elderly bed-ridden Gosho is secretly visited by an unaged Okazaki. Okazaki has a dream retelling the events of how Nora became a vampire, and wakes up beside a fully-regenerated Nora. He promises not to forget everyone he has met, as both hold hands and walk off into the night.
