= Blood on the Tracks (manga) =

Japanese manga series by Shūzō Oshimi

- First tankōbon volume cover, featuring Seiichi (as a baby) and Seiko Osabe

血の轍 (Chi no Wadachi)
- Genre: Psychological horror; Psychological suspense
- Manga
- Written by: Shūzō Oshimi
- Published by: Shogakukan
- English publisher: NA: Vertical; Kodansha USA (digital)
- Imprint: Big Comics Superior
- Magazine: Big Comic Superior
- Original run: February 24, 2017 – September 8, 2023
- Volumes: 17
- icon

Blood on the Tracks (Japanese: 血の轍, Hepburn: Chi no Wadachi) is a Japanese manga series written and illustrated by Shūzō Oshimi. It was serialized in Shogakukan's seinen manga magazine Big Comic Superior from February 2017 to September 2023, with its chapters collected into 17 tankōbon volumes. The story follows a middle school student, Seiichi Osabe, and his relationship with his overprotective mother, who after a certain event, begins to show a darker and horrifying side towards her son.

The series is licensed in English in North America by Vertical, who started releasing the volumes in print in February 2020; it is also digitally published by Kodansha USA since August of the same year.

By May 2023, Blood on the Tracks had over 2.3 million copies in circulation.

== Synopsis ==
Seiichi Osabe is a shy middle school student who lives an ordinary life under the care of his mother, Seiko. While others perceive Seiko as overprotective, Seiichi is entirely comfortable with her profound devotion and does not question her behavior. During a family hiking trip with his parents and paternal relatives, an event occurs that irrevocably shatters his peaceful existence. His cousin, Shigeru, playfully shoves Seiichi near a cliff edge, prompting Seiko to instantly intervene and pull him to safety. The family dismisses her actions as excessive and laughs at her response. Later, Seiichi and Shigeru venture to a higher, more precarious cliff edge. As Shigeru stands near the edge, Seiko, who has been following them, approaches her nephew and deliberately pushes him from the cliff. She then turns and offers her son a brief, tranquil smile. In the aftermath, Shigeru is left in a comatose state, and Seiichi remains the sole witness to his mother's true nature. This incident forces him to recognize the terrifying and dangerous reality of his mother's affection. His daily life is transformed into a continuous horror, as he must navigate an existence dominated by the disturbing and possessive protection of the person who claims to love him most.

== Characters ==
Seiichi Osabe (長部 静一, Osabe Seiichi)
Seiichi is a shy middle school student living with his mother, Seiko, whose devotion is viewed by others as overprotective. His perception of her love is shattered during a family trip, when she pushes his cousin from a cliff after a prior, minor incident. The cousin is left in a comatose state, and Seiichi is the sole witness. He subsequently discovers the dangerous reality of his mother's affection, and his daily life becomes a horror defined by her increasingly manipulative and possessive control.
Seiko Osabe (長部 静子, Osabe Seiko)
Seiichi's mother, Seiko, suffers from psychiatric disorders that manifest in an obsessive and possessive relationship with her son, extending far beyond typical overprotectiveness. Her singular focus is his possession, driven by a profound fear that he will be taken from her. This fixation has previously led her to extreme violence, including a past attempt on his life by throwing him from a hill slope. To maintain control, Seiko expertly conceals her true nature and systematically manipulates Seiichi's memories, ensuring his dependence and distorting his understanding of their shared past.
Yuiko Fukiishi (吹石 由衣子, Fukiishi Yuiko)
Yuiko is a classmate of Seiichi who lives with her alcoholic and abusive father, their relationship strained since her mother abandoned them. She and Seiichi develop a romantic relationship. Through this bond, Yuiko becomes the first person to cause Seiichi to question his mother's behavior and the manipulative nature of his relationship with her.
Ichirō Osabe (長部 一郎, Osabe Ichirō)
Ichirō is Seiichi's father and Seiko's husband, a salaryman who works diligently to maintain family stability following the cliff incident. He possesses a caring and calm demeanor. Despite his love for his family, he remains largely unaware of the severity of their domestic situation. This persists even after Seiko confesses to Shigeru's parents that she pushed their son, and when Seiko later suggests divorce, Ichirō does not demonstrate a willingness to pursue it.
Shigeru Mitsuishi (三石 しげる, Mitsuishi Shigeru)
Shigeru is Seiichi's cousin, known for his blunt and teasing nature, often mocking Seiichi about his relationship with his mother. During a family hiking trip, Seiko pushes him off a cliff. He survives the fall but is left in a comatose state. Through subsequent rehabilitation and the care of his mother, Shigeru eventually regains partial consciousness. Upon recognizing his aunt Seiko, he is immediately overcome with terror.

== Publication ==
Written and illustrated by Shūzō Oshimi, Blood on the Tracks was serialized in Shogakukan's seinen manga magazine Big Comic Superior from February 24, 2017, to September 8, 2023. According to Oshimi, the Bob Dylan album of the same name inspired the title for the series, but was not a major influence on the story. Shogakukan collected its chapters in 17 tankōbon volumes, released from September 8, 2017, to September 28, 2023.

In July 2019, Vertical announced that they have licensed the manga for an English language release in North America. The first volume was published on February 25, 2020. In July 2020, Kodansha USA announced the digital release of the manga, which started in August of the same year.

=== Volumes ===
No.	Original release date	Original ISBN	English release date	English ISBN
1	September 8, 2017	978-4-09-189623-0	February 25, 2020	978-1-949980-13-4
1. "Blood on the Tracks" (血の轍, Chi no Wadachi); 2. "Visitors" (来訪者, Raihōsha); 3. "The First Day of Summer" (夏の入り口, Natsu no Irikuchi); 4. "Perfect Weather" (行楽日和, Kōrakubiyori); 5. "A Beautiful Place" (きれいな場所, Kirei na Basho); 6. "With a Smile" (微笑, Bishō); 7. "Made Manifest" (顕現, Kengen)
2	December 27, 2017	978-4-09-189706-0	September 29, 2020	978-1-949980-39-4
8. "A Mother's Back" (母の背中, Haha no Senaka); 9. "Eye Contact" (眼差し, Manazashi); 10. "Pressure" (脳圧, Nōatsu); 11. "Cross to Bear" (十字架, Jūjika); 12. "Another Visitor" (来訪者2, Raihōsha Tsū); 13. "Rendezvous in the Shadows" (日陰の密会, Hikage no Mikkai); 14. "Nice to Meet You" (はじめましてえ, Hajimemashitē); 15. "Salvation" (救済, Kyūsai)
3	April 27, 2018	978-4-09-189863-0	November 17, 2020	978-1-949980-78-3
16. "Transfer" (乗り換え, Norikae); 17. "Tryst" (逢い引き, Aibiki); 18. "Long Day" (長い一日, Nagai Ichinichi); 19. "Answer" (返事, Henji); 20. "Membrane" (皮膜, Himaku); 21. "Confrontation" (対面, Taimen); 22. "Nightfall" (夜の始まり, Yoru no Hajimari); 23. "Fingers" (指, Yubi); 24. "Face" (顔, Kao)
4	September 28, 2018	978-4-09-860081-6	January 19, 2021	978-1-949980-79-0
25. "Limit" (臨界, Rinkai); 26. "Bench" (ベンチ, Benchi); 27. "Door" (とびら, Tobira); 28. "Step" (一歩, Ippo); 29. "Springtime of the Afternoon" (放課後の青春, Hōkago no Seishun); 30. "Soliloquy" (独白, Dokuhaku); 31. "Aroma" (芳香, Hōkō); 32. "Voices in the Grass" (草叢の声, Kusamura no Koe); 33. "I Don't Need You" (いらない, Iranai)
5	February 28, 2019	978-4-09-860229-2	March 30, 2021	978-1-64729-000-9
34. "Ditch" (捨てる, Suteru); 35. "Her Room" (彼女の部屋, Kanojo no Heya); 36. "Pledge" (契約, Keiyaku); 37. "Wakening" (目覚め, Mezame); 38. "Rain" (雨, Ame); 39. "Sodden Sounds" (濡れる声, Nureru Koe); 40. "Sin" (罪悪, Zaiaku); 41. "Eyes Inside" (内なる目, Uchinaru Me)
6	August 30, 2019	978-4-09-860386-2	June 22, 2021	978-1-64729-044-3
42. "Between the Banks" (両岸, Ryōgan); 43. "Homing" (帰巣, Kisō); 44. "Let's Talk" (お話をしよう, Ohanashi o Shiyō); 45. "What Really Happened" (本当のこと, Hontō no Koto); 46. "Busted" (発覚, Hakkaku); 47. "When Did It Come Out?" (いつ出た？, Itsu Deta?); 48. "Blood Oath" (血の誓約, Chi no Seiyaku); 49. "News" (報せ, Shirase); 50. "Reunion" (再会, Saikai)
7	December 26, 2019	978-4-09-860535-4	December 7, 2021	978-1-64729-070-2
51. "Kin" (親族, Shinzoku); 52. "Udon" (うどん, Udon); 53. "Promise I" (やくそくI, Yakusoku I); 54. "Promise II" (やくそくII, Yakusoku II); 55. "Mommy's Heartbeat" (ママの鼓動, Mama no Kodō); 56. "Afterwards" (その後, Sonogo); 57. "Paying a Call" (訪問, Hōmon); 58. "Seiko" (静子さん, Seiko-san); 59. "To the Quick" (核心, Kakushin)
8	April 27, 2020	978-4-09-860601-6	February 22, 2022	978-1-64729-071-9
60. "My Seiichi" (私の静一, Watashi no Seiichi); 61. "Runny" (半熟, Hanjuku); 62. "Expression" (発現, Hatsugen); 63. "Apologia" (釈明, Shakumei); 64. "High Ground" (高台, Takadai); 65. "Yuiko" (由衣子); 66. "Drive" (ドライブ, Doraibu); 67. "Murderers" (ひとごろし, Hitogoroshi); 68. "Burst" (決壊, Kekkai)
9	August 28, 2020	978-4-09-860701-3	July 12, 2022	978-1-64729-060-3
69. "All Hell Breaks Loose" (修羅場, Shuraba); 70. "Parting" (別れ, Wakare); 71. "Empty" (空, Kara); 72. "Desire" (欲求, Yokkyū); 73. "Interview (pt. 1)" (聴取1, Chōshu Wan); 74. "Interview (pt. 2)" (聴取2, Chōshu Tsū); 75. "I Belong to Me" (僕は僕のもの, Boku wa Boku no Mono); 76. "Revisiting" (再訪, Saihō); 77. "Sei" (せいちゃん, Sei-chan); 78. "Blood on the Tracks" (血の轍, Chi no Wadachi)
10	January 29, 2021	978-4-09-860791-4	August 16, 2022	978-1-64729-099-3
79. "Self-Awareness" (自覚, Jikaku); 80. "Together" (一緒, Issho); 81. "Ah Ha Ha" (あはは, Ahaha); 82. "Back to Life" (生き返る, Ikikaeru); 83. "Way Out" (出口, Deguchi); 84. "Come Out and Play" (呼び声, Yobikoe); 85. "Mountain" (山, Yama); 86. "Who Am I?" (僕は誰？, Boku wa Dare?); 87. "Coming" (来る, Kuru); 88. "What the Hell?" (なんなん？, Nannan?)
11	June 30, 2021	978-4-09-861053-2	September 6, 2022	978-1-64729-146-4
89. "Alll" (ぜぇんぶ, Zēnbu); 90. "Through Mommy's Eyes" (ママから見る, Mama kara Miru); 91. "All My Fault" (ぜんぶ僕, Zenbu Boku); 92. "Thanks" (ありがとう, Arigatō); 93. "Nightmare" (悪夢, Akumu); 94. "That Face" (あの顔, Ano Kao); 95. "In the Snow" (雪の現場, Yuki no Genba); 96. "Confirmation" (確認, Kakunin); 97. "Gaze" (視線, Shisen); 98. "Gnawing" (疑問, Gimon)
12	November 30, 2021	978-4-09-861148-5	December 27, 2022	978-1-64729-169-3
99. "Visitation" (面会, Menkai); 100. "Mommy" (ママ, Mama); 101. "Imagination" (さっかく, Sakkaku); 102. "Good News" (いい知らせ, Ii Shirase); 103. "Waiting In Vain" (待ちぼうけ, Machibōke); 104. "Judgement" (審判, Shinpan); 105. "Pointless" (ムダ, Muda); 106. "Announcement" (宣言, Sengen); 107. "Rancor" (怨讐, Onshū); 108. "Disposition" (処分, Shobun)
13	April 28, 2022	978-4-09-861302-1	May 2, 2023	978-1-64729-223-2
109. "Gone" (不帰, Fuki); 110. "Labor" (労働, Rōdō); 111. "Dad's Visit" (父の来る日, Chichi no Kuru Hi); 112. "Shadow" (面影, Omokage); 113. "Recollection" (追憶, Tsuioku); 114. "Hand" (手, Te); 115. "Body" (遺体, Itai); 116. "Place" (居場所, Ibasho); 117. "Homecoming" (帰郷, Kikyō)
14	September 30, 2022	978-4-09-861418-9	August 22, 2023	978-1-64729-299-7
118. "Just Like Her" (そっくり, Sokkuri); 119. "Finally" (やっと, Yatto); 120. "Phone Call" (電話, Denwa); 121. "Custody" (保護, Hogo); 122. "The Tracks" (轍, Wadachi); 123. "Seiko Tamiya" (田宮静子, Tamiya Seiko); 124. "Home" (家, Ie); 125. "Tea" (お茶, Ocha); 126. "Fist" (拳, Kobushi); 127. "Lid" (蓋, Futa)
15	January 30, 2023	978-4-09-861570-4	December 5, 2023	978-1-64729-301-7
128. "Typhoon" (台風, Taifū); 129. "Cat" (猫, Neko); 130. "Night Together" (ふたりの夜, Futari no Yoru); 131. "That House" (あのおうち, Ano O-uchi); 132. "The Other Side" (向こう側, Mukōgawa); 133. "Naked" (脱ぐ, Nugu); 134. "Blessing" (祝福, Shukufuku); 135. "Far Away" (遠い, Tōi); 136. "That Place" (あの場所, Ano Basho)
16	May 30, 2023	978-4-09-861713-5	April 23, 2024	978-1-64729-339-0
137. "Remember" (思い出して, Omoidashite); 138. "Once More" (もういちど, Mōichido); 139. "After the Storm" (嵐が過ぎて, Arashi ga Sugite); 140. "Come Around" (巡る, Meguru); 141. "Injuries" (傷, Kizu); 142. "Back Home" (帰宅, Kitaku); 143. "Stink" (くさい, Kusai); 144. "Flesh" (肉体, Nikutai); 145. "Eyes Meet" (まなざし, Manazashi)
17	September 28, 2023	978-4-09-862525-3	September 17, 2024	978-1-64729-367-3
146. "Life Together" (二人暮らし, Futarigurashi); 147. "Waking Dream" (夢現, Yumeutsutsu); 148. "Talking" (話す, Hanasu); 149. "Welcome Rain" (慈雨, Jiu); 150. "Peeling Off" (剥離, Hakuri); 151. "Mist" (霞, Kasumi); 152. "Empty Lot" (空き地, Akichi); 153. "Quiet Sky" (静かな空, Shizukana Sora)

== Reception ==
By May 2020, the manga had over 1 million copies in circulation; over 1.5 million copies in circulation by June 2021; over 2 million copies in circulation by September 2022; and over 2.3 million copies in circulation by May 2023.

The series ranked ninth on Kono Manga ga Sugoi!'s top 20 manga for male readers 2018. It was nominated for a Harvey Award in the Best Manga category in 2022. The series was nominated for the 68th Shogakukan Manga Award in the general category in 2022. It won the 50th Angoulême International Comics Festival's Prize for a Series in 2023. The series ranked sixteenth on the 2023 "Book of the Year" list by Da Vinci magazine. The series has been nominated for the 28th Tezuka Osamu Cultural Prize in 2024. It has been nominated for the Japan Society and Anime NYC's first American Manga Awards in the Best Continuing Manga Series category in 2024.

Ian Wolf of Anime UK News commended the series' narrative and Oshimi's art, noting its "detailed and sometimes disturbing close-ups" and "great views of the wilderness". He suggested the title might better suit a reference to Pink Floyd's The Wall, given its themes of maternal conflict. Wolf concluded, "Blood on the Tracks has been thrilling reading so far, and it will be interesting to see where Oshimi takes the story."
