= Toxic Daughter: Chi-chan =

Japanese manga series

- Tankōbon volume cover

ちーちゃん (Chii-chan)
- Genre: Horror; Psychological thriller
- Manga
- Written by: Shūzō Oshimi
- Published by: Kodansha
- English publisher: NA: Kodansha USA
- Magazine: Weekly Young Magazine
- Original run: January 15, 2024 – March 11, 2024
- Volumes: 1
- icon

Toxic Daughter: Chi-chan (ちーちゃん, Chii-chan) is a Japanese manga series written and illustrated by Shūzō Oshimi. Written as a prequel spin-off to the then-upcoming 2024 horror film Doku Musume, based on the character Chi-chan, designed by Oshimi for the film, the manga was serialized in Kodansha's seinen manga magazine Weekly Young Magazine from January to March 2024, with its chapters collected in a single tankōbon volume. Doku Musume would be released after the manga's conclusion in April 2024.

== Publication ==
Written and illustrated by Shūzō Oshimi, Toxic Daughter: Chi-chan was serialized in Kodansha's seinen manga magazine Weekly Young Magazine from January 15 to March 11, 2024. The manga is a prequel spin-off to the 2024 horror film Doku Musume, based on the character Chi-chan, designed by Oshimi for the film. Kodansha collected its chapters in a single tankōbon volume, released on April 5, 2024.

In July 2024, Kodansha USA announced that it had licensed the manga for English release in North America, with the volume set to be released on April 22, 2025.
