= Daigo Matsui =

Japanese screenwriter and film director (born 1985)

- 松居 大悟
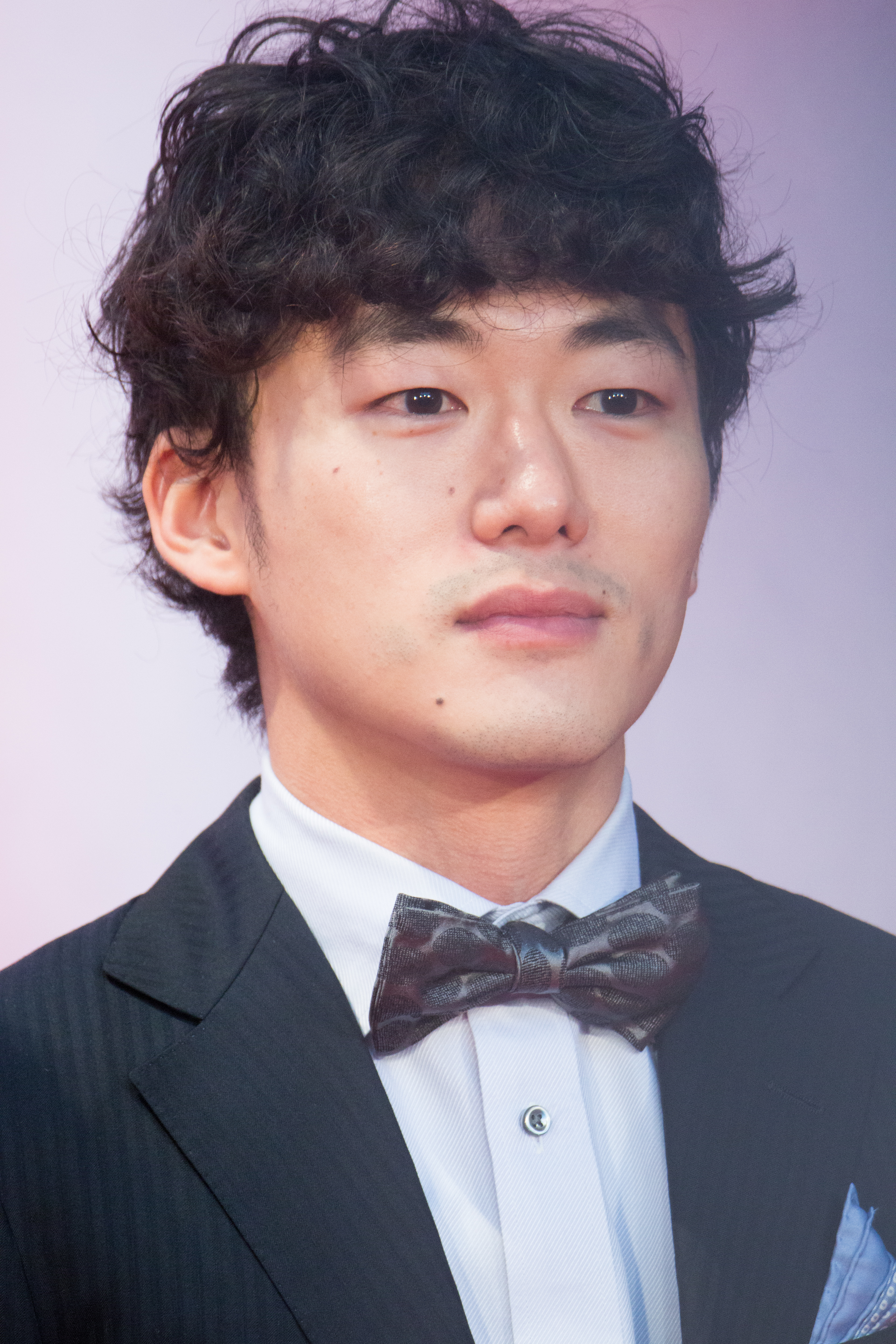
- Matsui at Opening Ceremony of the Tokyo International Film Festival in 2017
- Born: November 2, 1985 (age 40); Kitakyushu, Fukuoka, Japan
- Occupations: Screenwriter; film director; actor
- Relatives: Toko Matsui (mother)

Daigo Matsui (松居 大悟, Matsui Daigo; born November 2, 1985 in Fukuoka Prefecture) is a Japanese screenwriter and film director.

== Early life ==
Matsui was born in Kitakyushu City, Fukuoka, on November 2, 1985. His family consists of his mother, Toko Matsui a columnist who works mainly in Kyushu, his father, and an older brother.

== Filmography ==
=== Film ===
- Afro Tanaka (2012, director)
- Daily Lives of High School Boys (2013, writer, director)
- Sweet Poolside (2014, writer, director)
- Wonderful World End (2014, writer, director)
- Our Huff and Puff Journey (2015, writer, director)
- Japanese Girls Never Die (2016, director)
- Ice Cream and the Sound of Raindrops (2017, director)
- You, Your, Yours (2018, writer, director)
- #HandballStrive (2020, writer, director)
- Remain in Twilight (2021, writer, director)
- The Supporting Actors: The Movie (2021, director)
- Just Remembering (2022, writer, director)
- Hand (2022)
- Undead Lovers (2024)
- Rewrite (2025)
- Meets the World (2025)

=== TV series ===
- Twin Spica (2009, writer)
- A Day-Off of Hana Sugisaki (2023, writer, director)
