= Our Huff and Puff Journey =

- Theatrical release poster
- Directed by: Daigo Matsui
- Written by: Daigo Matsui; Sorami Tachi
- Produced by: Jun Takane; Takeshi Hayashi
- Cinematography: Daiki Shiotani
- Production companies: Space Shower TV; Connects
- Release date: September 12, 2015 (Japan)
- Running time: 91 minutes
- Country: Japan
- Language: Japanese

Our Huff and Puff Journey (Japanese: 私たちのハァハァ, Hepburn: Watshi-tachi no Haahaa) is a 2015 Japanese comedy drama film directed by Daigo Matsui. The film featured in the Melbourne International Film Festival.

== Plot ==
Four girls go on a journey, following their favorite band. The girls make the journey from Fukuoka to Tokyo, to see the band they worship, CreepHyp, perform. They record the journey with a handheld camera. The film covers the drama associated with the journey.

== Cast ==
- Sonoko Inoue as Ichinose
- Reika Oozeki
- Saku Mayama
- Toko Miura
- CreepHyp
- Sosuke Ikematsu
