= Inside Mari =

Japanese manga series

- Cover of the first volume

ぼくは麻理のなか (Boku wa Mari no Naka)
- Genre: Drama, mystery
- Manga
- Written by: Shūzō Oshimi
- Published by: Futabasha
- English publisher: NA: Crunchyroll; Denpa
- Imprint: Action Comics
- Magazine: Manga Action
- Original run: March 6, 2012 – September 6, 2016
- Volumes: 9
- Television drama
- Directed by: Sumisu; Hatsuki Yokoo; Hiroto Totsuka
- Written by: Yūko Shimoda
- Music by: Shiggy Jr.
- Original network: Fuji TV
- Original run: March 31, 2017
- Episodes: 8

Inside Mari (Japanese: ぼくは麻理のなか, Hepburn: Boku wa Mari no Naka) is a Japanese manga series written and illustrated by Shūzō Oshimi. It was serialized in Futabasha's Manga Action from March 2012 to September 2016, and published in nine volumes. An eight-episode television drama adaptation from Fuji TV was released in March 2017.

== Plot ==
An existential deconstruction of the body swap and yuri genres, the basic premise is initially presented as college dropout Isao Komori waking up in the body of high-school girl Mari Yoshizaki, only to find his college self still exists. As the story unfolds, as Komori bonds with fellow student Yori Kakiguchi (who is in love with Mari), they find out the real reason of the body swap is completely different from what they had imagined.

== Media ==
=== Manga ===
The series is written and illustrated by Shūzō Oshimi. It started serialization in Manga Action on March 6, 2012. The series ended in Manga Action on September 6, 2016. The series was published in nine tankōbon volumes.

In January 2014, Crunchyroll announced that they would release chapters of the series simultaneously with the Japanese release on their Crunchyroll Manga service. In August 2018, Denpa announced they licensed the series for digital and print releases.

==== Volumes ====
No.	Original release date	Original ISBN	English release date	English ISBN
1	December 7, 2012	978-4-57-584170-1	November 6, 2018	978-1-63-442900-9
2	August 9, 2013	978-4-57-584268-5	January 29, 2019	978-1-63-442902-3
3	June 9, 2014	978-4-57-584419-1	March 26, 2019	978-1-63-442904-7
4	November 28, 2014	978-4-57-584538-9	May 21, 2019	978-1-63-442906-1
5	March 27, 2015	978-4-57-584596-9	September 24, 2019	978-1-63-442908-5
6	August 10, 2015	978-4-57-584666-9	March 10, 2020	978-1-63-442910-8
7	December 9, 2015	978-4-57-584726-0	March 9, 2021	978-1-63-442912-2
8	May 9, 2016	978-4-57-584795-6	December 21, 2021	978-1-63-442914-6
9	September 28, 2016	978-4-57-584856-4	March 2, 2023	978-1-63-442917-7

=== TV drama ===
A live-action television drama adaptation was announced by Fuji TV in March 2017. It was eight episodes in length and was released on Fuji TV's streaming service on March 31, 2017. The series was directed by Sumisu, Hatsuki Yokoo, and Hiroto Totsuka, with Yūko Shimoda writing the scripts, and Shiggy Jr. performing the main theme. Elaiza Ikeda and Ryo Yoshizawa performed the lead roles.

== Reception ==
=== Critical response ===
Ross Locksley from UK Anime Network praised the first volume for the story and art, calling it a "pretty fine read". Nicholas Dupree from Anime News Network also offered praise to the story, while criticizing the main character as "instantly unlikable".

=== Kinokuniya removal ===
In July 2020, the Sydney branch of Books Kinokuniya removed the series, along with six others, from its store following a written complaint by politician Connie Bonaros that they violate Australia's child pornography laws. In a statement to Anime News Network, the Sydney store stated that due to the concerns, the books were required to be classified by the Australian Classification Board. Due to this, the store could not sell the series until it was properly classified.
