= Katsumoto =

Katsumoto (且元 or 勝元) is both a Japanese surname and a masculine Japanese given name meaning "victorious". Notable people with the surname include:

- Hosokawa Katsumoto (細川 勝元, 1430–1473), deputy to the Shōgun
- Katagiri Katsumoto (片桐 且元, 1556–1615), Japanese samurai

Fictional characters:

- Katsumoto, hero of the film The Last Samurai
- Gordon Katsumoto, detective in the remake of Magnum P.I. played by Tim Kang

== See also ==
- Katsumoto, a town on Iki Island
- Katsumoto, a So-Cal metalcore band signed to Uprising Records
