= Ice Cream and the Sound of Raindrops =

2017 Japanese film directed by Daigo Matsui

- Film poster
- Kanji: アイスと雨音
- Directed by: Daigo Matsui
- Written by: Daigo Matsui
- Produced by: Yukimiyoshi; Kotaro Abe; Takutoshi Naoi; Koichi Toda; Takeshi Hayashi; Ryo Yukizane; Yoko Takita
- Starring: Kokoro Morita; Reiko Tanaka; Taketo Tanaka; Yuzu Aoki
- Cinematography: Hiroki Shioya
- Edited by: Daigo Matsui
- Music by: Moroha
- Production company: Humax Cinema
- Distributed by: Spotted Productions
- Release dates: 29 October 2017 (Tokyo); 3 March 2018 (Japan)
- Running time: 74 minutes
- Country: Japan
- Language: Japanese

Ice Cream and the Sound of Raindrops (Japanese: アイスと雨音, Hepburn: Aisu to Amaoto) is a 2017 Japanese drama film directed by Daigo Matsui.

The film was shot in one 74-minute take, though it does not take place in real time; the story covers several weeks, with intertitles and musical interludes by rap group Moroha being used to segue between time periods.

== Plot ==
The story centers on a director and cast of six teens rehearsing a small-town Japanese production of the play "Morning", by Simon Stephens, which does not go as planned. The director pushes the actors to put as much of their real selves as they can into the role. As a result, the lines between the characters and actors become blurred.

== Cast ==
- Kokoro Morita as Kokoro
- Reiko Tanaka as Reiko
- Taketo Tanaka as Taketo
- Yuzu Aoki as Yuzu
- Guama Uchida as Guama
- Jotaro Tozuka as Jotaro
- Daigo Matsui as director

== Production ==
Ice Cream and the Sound of Raindrops was inspired by Matsui's personal experiences. Matsui, who is also the head of a theatre company, had one of his planned plays canceled two months before its opening: "I have never experienced such a rage before ... In a sense, [this film] was a revenge for a lost play." After discussing it with a friend, the emcee of Moroha, he decided to turn the incident into a film, with Moroha providing the live music.

Matsui put out a casting call that was open to junior and senior high school students, regardless of background, saying, "It doesn't matter if you've never acted before. I want to believe in the sparkle in the eyes." Eight were selected out of the 400 who auditioned. Matsui had trouble finding an actress for the lead role, with Kokoro Morita, who plays the protagonist, being chosen last. Reiko Tanaka, who plays Morita's friend, and two supporting cast members had no prior acting experience.

After rehearsing for two weeks, the movie was shot on the same days Matsui's canceled play would have been performed. Many of the stage crew who had worked on the play returned to work on the film, including the assistant director, art director, and video team. Matsui wanted to shoot the film in a continuous take to evoke the feeling of a live stage show; four takes were shot, with the final one being used for the film.

== Release ==
The film had its world premiere on 29 October 2017 at the 30th Tokyo International Film Festival. It also played at the 2018 Beijing International Film Festival and the 2018 Jeonju International Film Festival. In June 2020, it was one of the selections for We Are One, an online film festival organized in response to festival cancellations during the COVID-19 pandemic.

The film received a limited release in Japan on 3 March 2018.

=== Home media ===
The film was released on DVD and Blu-ray on 24 October 2018.
