= Shūzō Oshimi =

Japanese manga artist (born 1981)

- 押見 修造
- Born: March 19, 1981 (age 45); Gunma Prefecture, Japan
- Occupation: Manga artist
- Awards: Tetsuya Chiba Award

Shūzō Oshimi (押見 修造, Oshimi Shūzō; born 1981) is a Japanese manga artist and writer based in Tokyo who publishes works primarily for Kodansha. He made his debut with Superfly in Kodansha's Monthly Shōnen Magazine. He is best known for his manga Drifting Net Cafe (2009–2011), The Flowers of Evil (2009–2014), Happiness (2015–2019), and Blood on the Tracks (2017–2023). His works have been adapted into many different media including television drama, anime, and live action film. In 2001, he won the Tetsuya Chiba Award.

Oshimi is particularly known to write stories to his manga that reflect his own experiences, often centered around gender, puberty or psychosexual development, and other coming-of-age themes that reflect adolescence.

== Early life ==
Oshimi was born on March 19, 1981. His childhood hometown was in the countryside of Kiryu, Gunma, which also served as the setting of his manga The Flowers of Evil. While growing up there, the main places he would visit were the riverbank, the stairs of his junior high school, and the bookstore.

== Career ==
Oshimi debuted with the one-shot manga Superfly in Kodansha's Monthly Shōnen Magazine. He would go on to start his first series Avant-Garde Yumeko in the magazine. His works have been adapted into many different media, with Drifting Net Café and Inside Mari into television dramas, The Flowers of Evil into an anime, and Sweet Poolside into a live action film. In 2001, he won the Tetsuya Chiba Award.

== Influences ==
In his childhood Oshimi would read modernist poems from authors like Sakutarō Hagiwara and Mitsuharu Kaneko. Oshimi also thought that surrealist artists like André Breton, Max Ernst, and Paul Delvaux were cool. His favorite artist is Redon, and he also likes Francisco Goya. In his youth, Oshimi heavily identified with the protagonist of Tetsu Adachi's Song of Cherry Blossoms and it would later influence his manga The Flowers of Evil.

== Themes ==
Oshimi's narrative style consists of stories presenting quirky, clumsy main characters, usually a boy and a girl couple, and how their relationship unfolds as the narrative progresses. He also presents uncommon, uncomfortable and, sometimes, disturbing situations through which the protagonists take part. This narrative style has been seen in all of the author's works, including his best-known work, The Flowers of Evil.

Oshimi likes to explore themes such as coming-of-age and perversion, combined with his experiences in his youth. He thinks that the end of adolescence is hard to define, and is up to an individual to discover, such as in The Flowers of Evil. He also believes that perversion is a characteristic of every person that is surrounded by stigma which he wants people to think about. Oshimi also wants to explore the female perspective in his gender-bender manga Inside Mari, because to him, girls are "half of the world".

== Works ==
- 2001 — Superfly (スーパーフライ) – Independent work, first published in the "Avant-Garde Yumeko" collection.
- Midnight Paranoia Star (真夜中のパラノイアスター, Mayonaka no Paranoia Sutā)
- 2003 — Avant-Garde Yumeko (アバンギャルド夢子, Abangyarudo Yumeko) – Published by Kodansha, single-volume.
- 2004 — Sweet Poolside (スイートプールサイド) – Published by Kodansha, single-volume.
- 2005-2006 — Devil Ecstasy (デビルエクスタシー) – Published by Kodansha, 4 volumes.
- 2007-2008 — Yūtai Nova (ユウタイノヴァ) – Published by Kodansha, 2 volumes.
- 2008-2011 — Drifting Net Café (漂流ネットカフェ, Hyōryū Netto Kafe) – Published by Futabasha, 7 volumes.
- 2009-2014 — The Flowers of Evil (惡の華, Aku no Hana) – Published by Kodansha, 11 volumes.
- 2011-2012 — Shino Can't Say Her Name (志乃ちゃんは自分の名前が言えない, Shino-chan wa Jibun no Namae ga Ienai) – Published by Ohta Publishing, single-volume.
- 2012-2016 — Inside Mari (ぼくは麻理のなか, Boku wa Mari no Naka) – Serialized in Manga Action, published by Futabasha, 9 volumes.
- 2015-2019 — Happiness (ハピネス) – Published by Kodansha.
- 2017 — Waltz (ワルツ, Warutsu) – Serialized in Feel Young, published by Shodensha, single-volume.
- 2017 — Femme Fatale: The Art of Shuzo Oshimi (ファムファタル 押見修造画集, Famu Fataru Oshimi Shūzō gashū) – Published by Futabasha. It is an art book featuring art from many of Shūzō Oshimi's works.
- 2017-2023 — Blood on the Tracks (血の轍, Chi no Wadachi) – Serialized in Big Comic Superior, published by Shogakukan.
- 2020 — Miss Kusakabe (日下部さんー, Kusakabe-san) – Serialized in Web Comic Action, published by Futabasha, single-volume.
- 2021 — Lily (りり, Riri) – Serialized and published by Weekly Young Magazine, single-volume.
- 2020-2023 — Welcome Back, Alice (おかえりアリス, Okaeri Arisu) – Serialized in Bessatsu Shōnen Magazine, published by Kodansha.
- 2024 — Toxic Daughter: Chi-chan (ちーちゃん, Chii-chan) – Spin-off manga to the 2024 live-action film Doku Musume, which features a character designed by Oshimi who stars in this work.
- 2024 — The Sound of a Blink (瞬きの音, Mabataki no Oto) – Serialized in Big Comic Superior, published by Shogakukan.
