= The Flowers of Evil (manga) =

Japanese manga series

- First tankōbon volume cover, featuring Sawa Nakamura

惡の華 (Aku no Hana)
- Genre: Coming-of-age; Psychological drama; Suspense
- Manga
- Written by: Shūzō Oshimi
- Published by: Kodansha
- English publisher: NA: Vertical
- Imprint: Shōnen Magazine Comics
- Magazine: Bessatsu Shōnen Magazine
- Original run: September 9, 2009 – May 9, 2014
- Volumes: 11
- Anime television series
- Directed by: Hiroshi Nagahama
- Produced by: Gou Nakanishi; Kensuke Tateishi; Tomoko Kawasaki
- Written by: Aki Itami
- Music by: Hideyuki Fukasawa
- Studio: Zexcs
- Licensed by: NA: Sentai Filmworks; UK: MVM Films (expired); Anime Limited
- Original network: Animax, Tokyo MX, TVS, CTC, tvk, GTV, SUN, KBS
- Original run: April 5, 2013 – June 29, 2013
- Episodes: 13
- Live-action film
- Directed by: Noboru Iguchi
- Produced by: Yoshihiro Nagata; Hideyuki Wakuta
- Written by: Mari Okada
- Music by: Yasuhiko Fukuda
- Released: September 27, 2019
- Television drama
- Directed by: Noboru Iguchi; Paul Young
- Produced by: Hideyuki Wakuta; Kōichi Uruma
- Written by: Keita Meguro; Shūhō Takase
- Music by: Honoka Takahashi
- Studio: C&I Entertainment
- Original network: TV Tokyo
- Original run: April 10, 2026 – June 26, 2026
- icon

The Flowers of Evil (Japanese: 惡の華, Hepburn: Aku no Hana) is a Japanese manga series written and illustrated by Shūzō Oshimi. It was serialized in Kodansha's Bessatsu Shōnen Magazine between September 2009 and May 2014.

The story follows a middle school student named Takao Kasuga who is forced into a "contract" by fellow student Sawa Nakamura, after being caught stealing the gym clothes of his crush Nanako Saeki, and the series of events afterwards that follow these three characters. The title of the manga comes from Charles Baudelaire's Les Fleurs du mal.

An anime television series adaptation of the manga, produced by Zexcs, aired in Japan between April and June 2013. It was simulcast outside Japan by Crunchyroll. The anime was animated using rotoscoping techniques, causing some controversy among fans of the manga. A live-action film adaptation was released in September 2019.

In North America, the manga has been licensed for English language release by Vertical and the anime series has been licensed by Sentai Filmworks.

== Plot ==
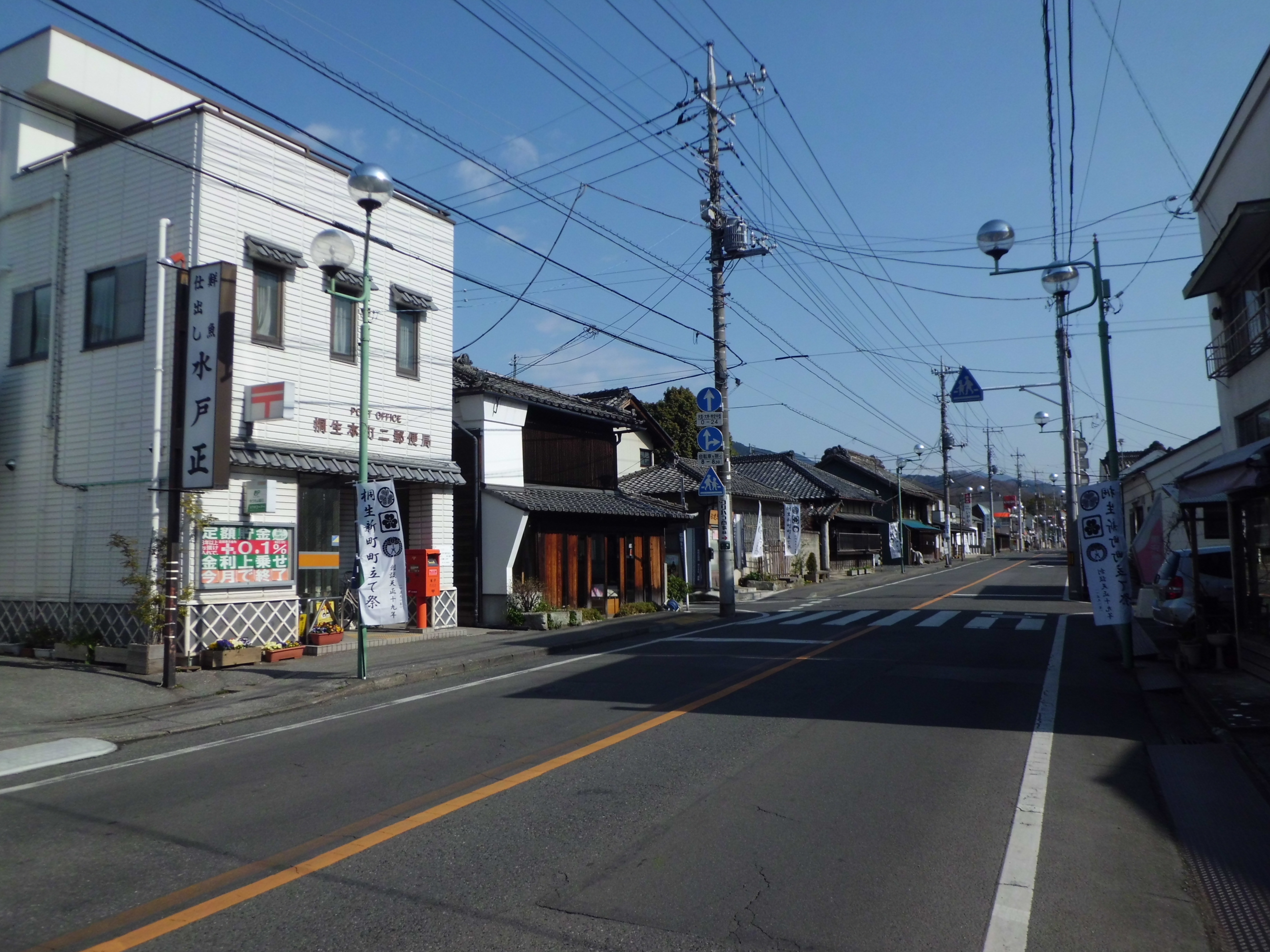
The first part of the series is set in Kiryū, Gunma

The story starts in a small town in Gunma Prefecture and follows Takao Kasuga, a middle school bookworm whose favorite book is Charles Baudelaire's Les Fleurs du mal. One day after school, he impulsively steals the gym clothes of Nanako Saeki, the classmate he idolizes. However, a girl named Sawa Nakamura sees him and blackmails Kasuga into a "contract". At the same time, Kasuga grows closer to Saeki and manages to become her boyfriend.

As Kasuga spends more time with both girls, he finds the guilt of his theft weighing down on him. He attempts to confess by vandalizing his classroom with Nakamura, but Saeki refuses to break up with him. When his mother finds out he was responsible for the vandalism, he runs from home and attempts to bike with Nakamura past the mountain adjacent to the town. Saeki catches up to the pair as they rest and tries to make Kasuga come back. Unable to choose between them, he estranges both girls and the police collect them.

A month later, Kasuga breaks up with Saeki and resolves to help Nakamura. He writes a composition to convey his feelings to her. When she runs from him, Kasuga goes to her house and reads in her diary about her disappointment in not being able to reach "the other side". He steals the panties of all the girls in his class except Saeki's and uses them to decorate a makeshift hideout, winning Nakamura's approval.

At the start of summer vacation, they create a plan to nail the panties to a piece of plywood to display at the upcoming festival. Saeki discovers the plan and lures Kasuga to the hideout, trying to seduce him and make him stay in their town. When he chooses Nakamura over her, she rapes him but Kasuga resists, causing her to burn the hideout down.

Saeki later turns herself in to the police for setting the fire, prompting her best friend Ai Kinoshita to tell their school about Kasuga's crimes. The school does not involve the police and his parents decide to move over the vacation. The day before the festival, Nakamura breaks into Kasuga's house, attacking his father, and the two escape. At the festival, they don disguises and climb to the top of a float while wielding a knife. They curse their town and pour kerosene on themselves, but before they can use a lighter, Nakamura pushes Kasuga over the float and she gets tackled by her father.

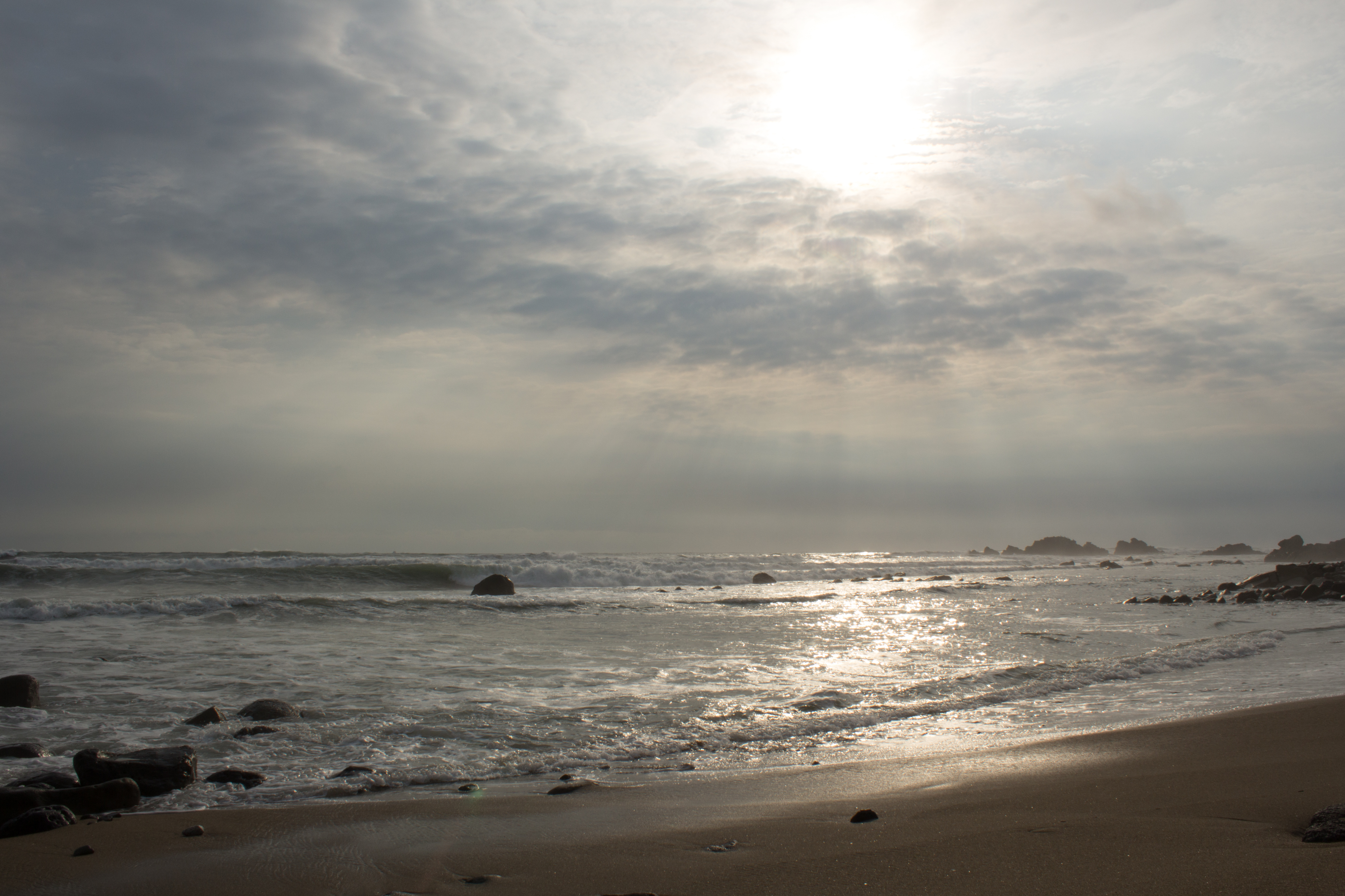
The beach in Tokawa Town where Kasuga and Tokiwa speak with Nakamura

A few years later, Kasuga is going to high school in Ōmiya-ku, Saitama, and still cannot forget Nakamura. Kasuga finds his classmate Aya Tokiwa looking at Les Fleurs du mal in a used bookstore and she starts lending him novels, rekindling his love of literature.

Kasuga discovers that she is working on a novel and is brought to tears upon reading the manuscript because he can identify with the protagonist. Kasuga encounters Saeki and when they meet up for lunch, she accuses him of using Tokiwa as a replacement for Nakamura. Kasuga visits Tokiwa at her workplace and asks her out, saying that he will save her, and she accepts.

Kasuga visits his hometown for his dying grandfather and ends up meeting Kinoshita, who regrets being left behind by Saeki and tells Kasuga where Nakamura moved. Tokiwa finishes her novel, but Kasuga tells her about his past and his desire to meet Nakamura again. They take the train to Tokawa Station in Chōshi, Chiba and find her eatery, where her mother warns them that Nakamura is "peaceful now", but Tokiwa insists on speaking to her.

They talk at a nearby beach and Kasuga questions her, but does not get satisfactory answers. Kasuga and Nakamura attack each other, turning into a playfight between all three. Kasuga tells Nakamura that he is happy that she did not disappear, and she tells him never to come back. Later, Kasuga is in college and still dating Tokiwa, who is working on another novel. After falling asleep with Tokiwa, Kasuga dreams of the wilting flower of evil, its scar no longer present on his hand. In his dream he envisions the futures of the series' characters; he marries and has a child with Tokiwa, Saeki starts her own family and reunites with Kinoshita, and Nakamura finds contentment, eventually moving away to the city. At the end of the dream Nakamura looks up at her own wilting flower of evil. When he wakes up, Kasuga starts writing in his empty book just as he was in his dream, presumably about the manga's events.

The final chapter depicts Nakamura's perspective of her first meeting with Kasuga. Through her eyes she sees everyone and everything around her as monochrome and deformed, symbolizing her distaste for normality. When she sees Kasuga steal the gym suit, his features become clear to her. Later on, Nakamura feels herself reverting to the normalcy she despises. Before she does, Kasuga appears on his bike, fully defining her world in both detail and a deep crimson color.

== Characters ==
Takao Kasuga (春日 高男, Kasuga Takao)
Voiced by: Shin'ichirō Ueda
Played by: Kentaro Ito
An introverted middle school student with a strong interest in literature. He feels alienation as well as suffocation from the world around him. His view of other people is dim – he considers them to be ignorant as well as incapable of understanding the abstract themes present in the books he reads, namely Les Fleurs du mal by Charles Baudelaire. He idolizes his classmate Saeki from afar as the pinnacle of beauty and virtue, calling her his muse and an angel. Although he considers his worship of Saeki to be purely platonic, he cannot help experiencing feelings of sexual attraction to her. Kasuga is deeply disturbed by these feelings because he thinks they devalue his worship of Saeki and are a sin against her purity.
While initially viewing Nakamura with fear and apprehension, Kasuga gradually develops a bond with her. The feelings he develops for Nakamura are not romantic in the traditional sense, but rather are a combination of deep fascination, sympathy and servitude. He rejects Saeki to pursue a vision of the future with Nakamura in which the two of them try to make it to "the other side".
Sawa Nakamura (仲村 佐和, Nakamura Sawa)
Voiced by: Mariya Ise
Played by: Tina Tamashiro
A classmate of Kasuga who shows utter disinterest in the world around her as well as contempt for anyone she comes in contact with. Her existence is ignored by her classmates, who view her as disturbed. She maintains a flat affect for most of her interactions, which she keeps very brief. Nakamura views the world as a "sea of shit-bugs" only interested in sex. She is deeply tortured by the inescapability of her own sexual nature and also disgusted by the world's facade of respectability.
Nakamura views Kasuga as a person with a nature similar to hers although his is still buried beneath the layers of respectability engendered by society. She decides to make a contract with him in which she plans to gradually remove the "layers of skin" he is hiding behind. Nakamura's feelings toward Kasuga start out somewhat impersonal, with her treating him like a test subject or play-thing. However as time goes on, she develops a deeply personal investment in his progress.
Nanako Saeki (佐伯 奈々子, Saeki Nanako)
Voiced by: Yōko Hikasa
Played by: Shiori Akita
Another girl from Kasuga's class, on whom he has a crush, Saeki is deemed to be the top student of their class, and is considered to be a popular and beautiful girl. After he defends Nakamura from the rest of their class and supports her, Saeki begins to take an interest in Kasuga, especially his passion for Les Fleurs du mal, though she struggles to understand the content. Viewing herself as stifled by her parents, she particularly connects with how he is able to show his true self without having to hide his personality, desires or interests. The two start dating and Saeki reveals how she longs for a life in which she does not have to fake herself with being well-mannered, composed and focused on study. Indeed, her relationship with Kasuga reflects his with Nakamura, her self hatred and idolization of him drives her to commit acts of arson and rape. She later lives in Utsunomiya, and has gotten a new boyfriend who, according to Tokiwa, "looks a lot" like Kasuga.
Aya Tokiwa (常磐 文, Tokiwa Aya)
Played by: Marie Iitoyo
A character first introduced in the second part of the story, she is portrayed as a tall, red-haired beauty of Kasuga's year, revered by his friends, but known to date an older guy from another school. Kasuga notices her holding a copy of Les Fleurs du mal in a bookstore and discovers her passion for books. She helps him regain his interest in literature once more, and becomes close to him, to the point of inciting her boyfriend Koji's suspicion towards Kasuga. Kasuga supports her in writing her novel.
Ai Kinoshita (木下 亜衣, Kinoshita Ai)
Portrayed by: Tsugumi Nakamura
Voiced by: Ayako Uemura
Saeki's best friend. Outspoken and hotheaded, she cares deeply for Saeki and begins to resent Kasuga for the pain he's caused her. She later gets the truth from Saeki when she realises her friend has been spying on Kasuga and Nakamura. She feels the urgency to tell the police the deeds of the couple, only to be scolded by Saeki, who believes she'll be able to pull Kasuga out of his mess. As events develops and she realises Saeki's corruption as well, she is unable to hold out and becomes responsible for exposing Kasuga and Nakamura, but in the process also affects her best friend.
Yamada (山田, Yamada)
Portrayed by: Katsutoshi Matsuzaki
Voiced by: Katsutoshi Matsuzaki
A friend of Kasuga. He is a chubby guy, a blabbermouth mocker and does not understand Kasuga's fascination with Les Fleurs du mal.
Ken Kojima (小島 建, Kojima Ken)
Portrayed by: Ryōsuke Tani
Voiced by: Shin'ya Hamazoe
Another friend of Kasuga's.

== Production ==
=== Manga ===
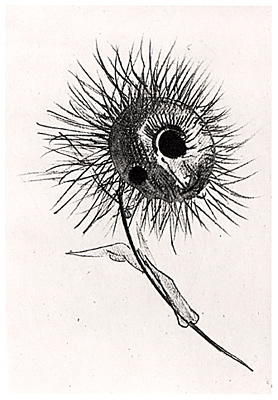
The illustration of a flower by Odilon Redon in Les Fleurs du mal which Oshimi modified for the manga

Oshimi first read Charles Baudelaire's Les Fleurs du mal in middle school and found the book to feel "suspicious, indecent, yet nastily noble". He based the eye-flower in the series on an illustration for the book by Odilon Redon, his favorite artist. Oshimi also makes references to other artists such as with the cover of the tenth chapter parodying Francisco Goya's The Clothed Maja.

One influence for the manga that Oshimi cited was Tetsu Adachi's Song of Cherry Blossoms, where he could relate to the feelings of the protagonist and described the manga as "depicting murky self-consciousness and the dark side of youth with astounding intensity..." Other manga that influenced him were Masahiko Kikuni's Moonlight Whispers and Haruko Kashiwagi's Dog, which he felt had in common that they were coming-of-age stories about "discovering 'a value system of one's own'" which he hoped his own manga could do. After the publication of the second volume of the manga, Oshimi learned of the French film Don't Deliver Us from Evil and in retrospect he felt he could relate to the themes of the film where "the girls worship Baudelaire and Lautrémont, create a kingdom of evil all for themselves, and fall into ruin..."

Oshimi drew on many aspects of his life for the manga such as the settings and characters. The settings are based on real locations from Oshimi's hometown including: the school library, the riverbank, and the park where Kasuga is splashed with water. Many of the characters also have real-life models: Nakamura is based on a person who used to call Oshimi things like "shitbug" and other phrases that Nakamura uses. Kasuga's friend Hiruta was based on Oshimi's middle school friend who betrayed him to the class bully.

=== Anime ===
An example of the rotoscoping process used for the anime with sequentially: a video still, tracing, and the colored result

Initially, the director Hiroshi Nagahama declined the offer to direct the anime because he felt it would be best presented as live-action, but reconsidered when he figured out how to adapt it and pitched the idea of using rotoscoping. He felt it was the most appropriate choice because to him, the manga felt very realistic and close to daily life. The live-action filming took around three months to complete on location in Kiryū, Gunma. Along with the editing after, it took about twice the amount of time to produce than a regular anime. The end cards at the end of each episode were animated by Nagahama himself in traditional anime style to differentiate them and he made Oshimi's hair wave around to emulate flash animation.

Before the premiere of the anime, the producer opted to not release any character artwork. When the anime aired, the use of rotoscoping resulted in criticism from fans of the manga. Nagahama knew that the rotoscoping would be controversial, but he felt it was worth it because it would make the anime leave an impact, even if it was viewed as "creepy". When asked at a Q&A panel at Animazement 2013 why he did not make the adaptation a traditional live-action series, he responded that in live-action, the focus is on the actors and not the characters. When further asked about what kind of atmosphere he was trying to create with the pacing and soundtrack of the anime, Nagahama replied that he wanted to make an anime that feels fresh. In an interview with Natalie including both Nagahama and Oshimi, Oshimi said that he was aware of the rotoscoping idea and approved of the direction Nagahama took the adaptation, especially of his intent to "leave the viewer with a scar" which he felt aligned with his goal of figuratively "murdering" the readers. He also felt that Nagahama had deep insight into the story and that the anime along with the manga formed two versions of the story from his original idea. Oshimi was also involved in providing feedback on the adaptation as it went along and when shown anime-style drawings, preferred the different look of rotoscoping.

== Themes ==
One of the issues that Oshimi wanted to tackle with the manga was the concept of "perversion", which he felt was misunderstood and actually a hidden quality of everyone. Another question he wanted to answer was where the process of adolescence ends; the beginning clearly demarcated by the physical characteristics of puberty, but the ending unclear, which he felt has to be discovered by an individual by themselves.

== Media ==
=== Manga ===
The manga was launched in the first issue of the Japanese shōnen manga magazine Bessatsu Shōnen Magazine published by Kodansha on September 9, 2009, and ended on May 9, 2014. Kodansha has compiled the 57 chapters into 11 volumes from March 17, 2010, to June 9, 2014. The series was licensed in North America by Vertical in September 2011, with the first volume published on May 8, 2012, and the last volume on October 14, 2014. Vertical announced at Anime Central 2017 that it will re-release the manga in four omnibus volumes. The Japanese edition of the cover of the first volume originally had a dialogue balloon where Nakamura says "Shitbug" (クソムシが, Kusomushi ga), but the Vertical edition replaced the speech with the title. The manga has also been published in Italy by Panini Comics, in Spain by Norma Editorial, in Taiwan by Tong Li Publishing, and in Indonesia by Elex Media Komputindo.

=== Anime ===
The anime adaptation is directed by Hiroshi Nagahama and produced by Zexcs. It was the first anime to use rotoscoping exclusively. It aired in Japan between April 5 and June 29, 2013, and has been licensed by Sentai Filmworks in North America. Crunchyroll has the streaming rights in Australia, North America, UK and other territories. The opening theme is "Aku no Hana" (惡の華) by Uchūjin with guest vocalists Noko, Mariko Gotō and Shiho Nanba. The ending theme is "〜花〜 A Last Flower" by Asa-Chang & Junray. At Sakura-Con 2014, Nagahama explained the flashforward at the end of the last episode as a declaration of his intention for a second season.

No.	Title	Original release date
1	"Flowers of Evil 1 of 13"	April 5, 2013
Kasuga is a literary nerd who goes to middle school in a small town. He idolizes Baudelaire and is in love with his beautiful and brilliant classmate Saeki. In his class there is also a redheaded outcast called Nakamura. One day after class, he returns to the classroom for a book he's forgotten, only to find Saeki's sports clothes on the floor.
2	"Flowers of Evil 2 of 13"	April 12, 2013
Kasuga steals Saeki's clothes. The next day his guilty conscience makes him uncomfortable in class. When riding his bike, he encounters Nakamura who tells him she saw him steal the clothes. The next day, she meets him in the library and blackmails him into following her orders. She pushes him into Saeki's breast and demands that he write an essay about the experience.
3	"Flowers of Evil 3 of 13"	April 19, 2013
Kasuga meets Nakamura after school in the library. He didn't write the essay Nakamura asked for. As a form of revenge, she undresses him and forces him to wear Saeki's clothes. The next day someone steals money in a locker. Nakamura gets accused. Because he was with her, Kasuga defends her. As a consequence, the class thinks he's in love with Nakamura.
4	"Flowers of Evil 4 of 13"	April 26, 2013
After school, Kasuga bumps into Saeki. She reveals that she thinks the way he defended Nakamura was pretty cool. Another day, Kasuga carries boxes for Saeki. He asks her on a date to a bookshop. Nakamura sees them and later forces Kasuga to wear Saeki's clothes underneath his own for the date.
5	"Flowers of Evil 5 of 13"	May 5, 2013
The date goes well. Nakamura, who's been following them, asks Kasuga to kiss Saeki. He refuses, asking Saeki to be in a relationship. As she accepts, Nakamura dowses him in water, revealing the clothes underneath. He runs away before Saeki notices. Nakamura promises she'll stop interfering.
6	"Flowers of Evil 6 of 13"	May 12, 2013
The class learns of Saeki and Kasuga's relationship. Nakamura becomes friends with Saeki. In the library, Nakamura tells Kasuga that what Saeki really wants is to have sex with him. Saeki overhears her, and doesn't show up the next day. Kinoshita asks Kasuga to deliver handouts to Saeki. He goes and is taunted by Nakamura on the doorstep.
7	"Flowers of Evil 7 of 13"	May 19, 2013
Saeki thinks Kasuga might be with Nakamura, but when asked if hiding anything, Kasuga denies, and she decides to trust him. Kasuga then pleads Nakamura to tell Saeki the truth as he can't. Nakamura asks him to meet her in front of the school at midnight. She convinces him to write his deeds on their classroom chalkboard and then they proceed to extensively vandalize the room.
8	"Flowers of Evil 8 of 13"	May 26, 2013
Nakamura and Kasuga slowly walk home, hand in hand. The next day, the whole class is in uproar. The ink covered Kasuga's name. Saeki is devastated, her clothes at the center of the destruction. The whole school gets informed. Kasuga pukes. Saeki confronts Kasuga, having noticed that the drawing on the floor was the same as on his favorite book. He breaks up with her.
9	"Flowers of Evil 9 of 13"	June 2, 2013
Saeki refuses to break up. The next day, Kasuga is absent. Saeki asks Nakamura what her relationship with Kasuga is. She says she's contracted to reveal his deviance. Saeki argues he's not a deviant. She goes to Kasuga's house and make a case for him through the window. His mom finds his stained clothes and he runs away. Saeki sees his mom looking for him.
10	"Flowers of Evil 10 of 13"	June 9, 2013
Kasuga goes up the mountains with Nakamura on his bike. They stop because of the rain. Saeki goes looking for Kasuga and finds them. Nakamura undresses him again. When asked to choose between the two of them, he stands his middle ground and upsets both. A police car shows up because of Saeki's parents and brings them all home.
11	"Flowers of Evil 11 of 13"	June 16, 2013
One month later it is summer. The three have been ignoring each other. On Kinoshita's initiative, Saeki and Kasuga talk, only to break up. Kasuga is a shell of his former self. His mother is upset. He pukes. He knows Saeki is going to be alright without him, but even in his dreams, he can't stop thinking about Nakamura.
12	"Flowers of Evil 12 of 13"	June 23, 2013
Kasuga writes an essay to Nakamura. Kinoshita asks Kasuga's friends what is wrong with him. Kasuga tries to give his essay to Nakamura, but she ignores him, so he starts reading it to her. She runs away. He goes to Nakamura's house to deliver the essay. On the doorstep, he is invited in by her father, who says that Kasuga is her first friend.
13	"Flowers of Evil 13 of 13"	June 30, 2013
Kasuga enters Nakamura's room. He finds her diary and starts reading it. He recalls what had happened. Nakamura comes back, seizes the diary and runs away. He follows her and catches up to her. A rapid-fire montage of future events from the manga plays on screen, including the hideout, Kasuga's rape, and the day of the festival. Back in the present, Kasuga asks Nakamura to make a contract with him: they'll do what they can in order to leave for good someday.

=== Live-action film ===
A live-action film adaptation was released in Japan on September 27, 2019. The film is directed by Noboru Iguchi, with a screenplay by Mari Okada and music by Yasuhiko Fukuda starring Kentaro Ito.

=== Television drama ===
A 12-episode live-action television drama adaptation was released weekly on TV Tokyo weekly starting on April 10th, 2026 and was streamed exclusively on Disney+ after broadcasting. The series is directed by Noboru Iguchi, who previously directed the film adaptation, and stars Fuku Suzuki as Kasuga and Ano as Nakamura.

== Reception ==
=== Manga ===
The Flowers of Evil was one of the Jury Recommended Works in the Manga Division at the 17th Japan Media Arts Festival in 2013. The manga was nominated for the fifth Manga Taishō (Cartoon Grand Prize) but lost to Hiromu Arakawa's Silver Spoon. The manga was also 18th on the Top 20 Manga for Male Readers in the guidebook Kono Manga ga Sugoi!.

In Japan, the manga charted several times on the Oricon lists: Volume 5 was the 30th best-selling manga for the week of January 2, 2012, rising to 17th the next week. Volume 7 was the 44th best-selling manga for the week of December 10, 2012. Volume 8 was the 22nd best-selling manga for the week of June 3, 2013, rising to 17th the next week. Volume 9 was the 22nd best-selling manga for the week of August 5, 2013, falling to 29th the next week. Volume 10 was the 17th best-selling manga for the week of January 6, 2014, falling to 25th the next week. Volume 11 was the 5th best-selling manga for the week of June 9, 2014, falling to 42nd the next week. The first 9 volumes of the manga sold over 2 million copies in Japan. Vertical's localization of the manga was able to reach The New York Times Manga Best Sellers chart on two different occasions: Volume 1 was the 3rd best-selling manga for the week of May 13, 2012, and Volume 3 was the 8th best-selling manga for the week of October 28, 2012.

=== Anime ===
Anime News Network (ANN) editor Carl Kimlinger gave the series high praise when it was streaming, giving credit to both director Hiroshi Nagahama and composer Hideyuki Fukasawa for doing Oshimi's work justice with direction that is part psychological thriller and darkly romantic with the inclusion of rotoscoping and a score that is atonally sinister, saying that, "[I]t is a series that can be attacked from any direction and not crack. It is, in its delightfully unpleasant way, a masterpiece." Fellow ANN editor Nick Creamer also liked the series, praising the story for conveying themes of human identity and codependence with amoral people and the direction for its slow and methodical pace, concluding that "The Flowers of Evil is one of the best shows of recent years, an absurdly confident mood piece with a uniquely effective aesthetic and a true understanding of and sympathy for the emotional trials of youth. It should be watched by anyone interested in the potential of animation for conveying human truth."

Richard Eisenbeis of Kotaku, on the other hand, heavily panned the series for having an unlikable main cast, lack of any stakes or tension, and horrendous technical aspects in terms of animation and no musical score in places, concluding that, "It's just an utter train wreck of a series. I recommend it to no one." Tim Jones, writing for THEM Anime Reviews, was also put off by the rotoscoping style, saying that from a distance it looks "comical and oft-putting (sic)." But Jones gave praise to the cinematography, the main trio's development and Nagahama's direction on a typical high school setting. Jacqueline Ristola argues that Nagahama uses rotoscope animation "to visually represent the series' themes: the divide between the private and the public, the use of masks in society, the sense of alienation, and the concealment of one's 'true self.'" Chris Beveridge of The Fandom Post wrote: "This has more life to it, more meaning to it, than pretty much the majority of shows out there because of the acting, the story and the presentation. This is definitely the kind of work that can start some seriously great if difficult conversations and is worth exploring, even if only for yourself." Ink of Otaku USA chose the series as his pick for the Top Anime of 2013, praising the performances, sound design, pacing and rotoscoping technique for delivering "an oppressive atmosphere of anxiety" in a high school setting, concluding that, "If you like slow, moody pieces, Flowers of Evil is a must!"
