= Totto-Chan: The Little Girl at the Window (film) =

2023 film by Shinnosuke Yakuwa

- Theatrical release poster
- Kanji: 窓ぎわのトットちゃん
- Revised Hepburn: Madogiwa no Totto-chan
- Directed by: Shinnosuke Yakuwa
- Screenplay by: Shinnosuke Yakuwa; Yōsuke Suzuki
- Based on: Totto-Chan: The Little Girl at the Window by Tetsuko Kuroyanagi
- Produced by: Rena Takahashi; Keiji Takagawa
- Starring: Liliana Ohno; Koji Yakusho; Shun Oguri; Anne Watanabe; Karen Takizawa
- Cinematography: Kentaro Minegishi
- Edited by: Toshihiko Kojima
- Music by: Yuji Nomi
- Production company: Shin-Ei Animation
- Distributed by: Toho
- Release date: December 8, 2023
- Running time: 114 minutes
- Country: Japan
- Language: Japanese

Totto-Chan: The Little Girl at the Window (Japanese: 窓ぎわのトットちゃん, Hepburn: Madogiwa no Totto-chan) is a 2023 Japanese animated biographical film written and directed by Shinnouske Yakuwa with Yōsuke Suzuki as a co-writer; the film is based on an autobiographical novel of the same title by Tetsuko Kuroyanagi. Produced by Shin-Ei Animation and distributed by Toho, it tells Kuroyanagi's story as a child (nicknamed Totto) of going to Tomoe Gakuen, and learning new things as Japan descends into war. The film stars Liliana Ohno as the voice of Totto, alongside Koji Yakusho, Shun Oguri, Anne Watanabe, and Karen Takizawa. It was released in Japan on December 8, 2023.

== Synopsis ==
The film is based on the early life of Tetsuko Kuroyanagi, whose character bears her childhood nickname, Totto-chan. Totto-chan is depicted as being a poor fit for the 1930s Japanese public school system, exhibiting behaviors similar to attention deficit hyperactivity disorder. Her wealthy parents withdraw her from public school and enroll her at an unusual one-room elementary school where most classes are held in a converted streetcar. The school principal, Sosaku Kobayashi, offers students many unusual innovations linked to progressive education, such as student-directed curricula, interpretive dance and other group activities, and guides students to respond to physical disability with respect and mutual care. The principal also introduces his own traditions, notably a daily requirement that students bring something from the "ocean" and "mountains" in their bento (a food education focus later called shokuiku). After showcasing the successes of the principal's unorthodox approach to childhood education, the film pivots to depicting the school's slow decline during wartime austerity programs, followed by its abrupt closure due to the firebombing of Tokyo and evacuation of children. As opposed to the book, where the war is depicted in the background before abruptly intruding into the narrative, the film emphasizes how war interferes with Totto-chan's learning and her father's career.

The film provides a simplified narrative where most of the characters from the book appear only briefly. The film also alludes to Tetsuko Kuroyanagi's lifelong success as a television personality.

== Voice cast ==
| Character | Japanese voice cast |
|---|---|
| Totto-chan | Liliana Ohno |
| Sōsaku Kobayashi | Koji Yakusho |
| Moritsuna Kuroyanagi | Shun Oguri |
| Cho Kuroyanagi | Anne Watanabe |
| Miss Oishi | Karen Takizawa |

== Production ==
In March 2023, it was announced that an anime film adaptation of Tetsuko Kuroyanagi's autobiographical novel Totto-Chan: The Little Girl at the Window was in development, with Shinnouske Yakuwa writing and directing the film at Shin-Ei Animation, Yōsuke Suzuki co-writing the screenplay with Yakuwa, and Shizue Kaneko designing the characters. In July of that year, it was announced that Liliana Ohno was to voice Totto-chan. In September of that year, it was announced that Koji Yakusho, Shun Oguri, Anne Watanabe, and Karen Takizawa were cast for the film. The theme song for the film is "You Know What" (あのね, Ano ne) by Aimyon.

== Release ==
The film was released in theaters in Japan on December 8, 2023.

== Reception ==
=== Box office ===
The film debuted at number 6 out of the top 10 in the Japanese box office in its opening weekend, and later dropped to number 8 in its second week.

=== Critical reception ===
Richard Eisenbeis of Anime News Network gave the film an "A" rating and stated, "It's got fantastic characters, a powerful message about childhood education, and a unique exploration of the consequences of war through a child's eyes".

=== Accolades ===
The film was nominated for the 47th Japan Academy Film Prize for the "Best Animation Film" category.
