= Nana Seino =

Japanese actress

- 清野 菜名
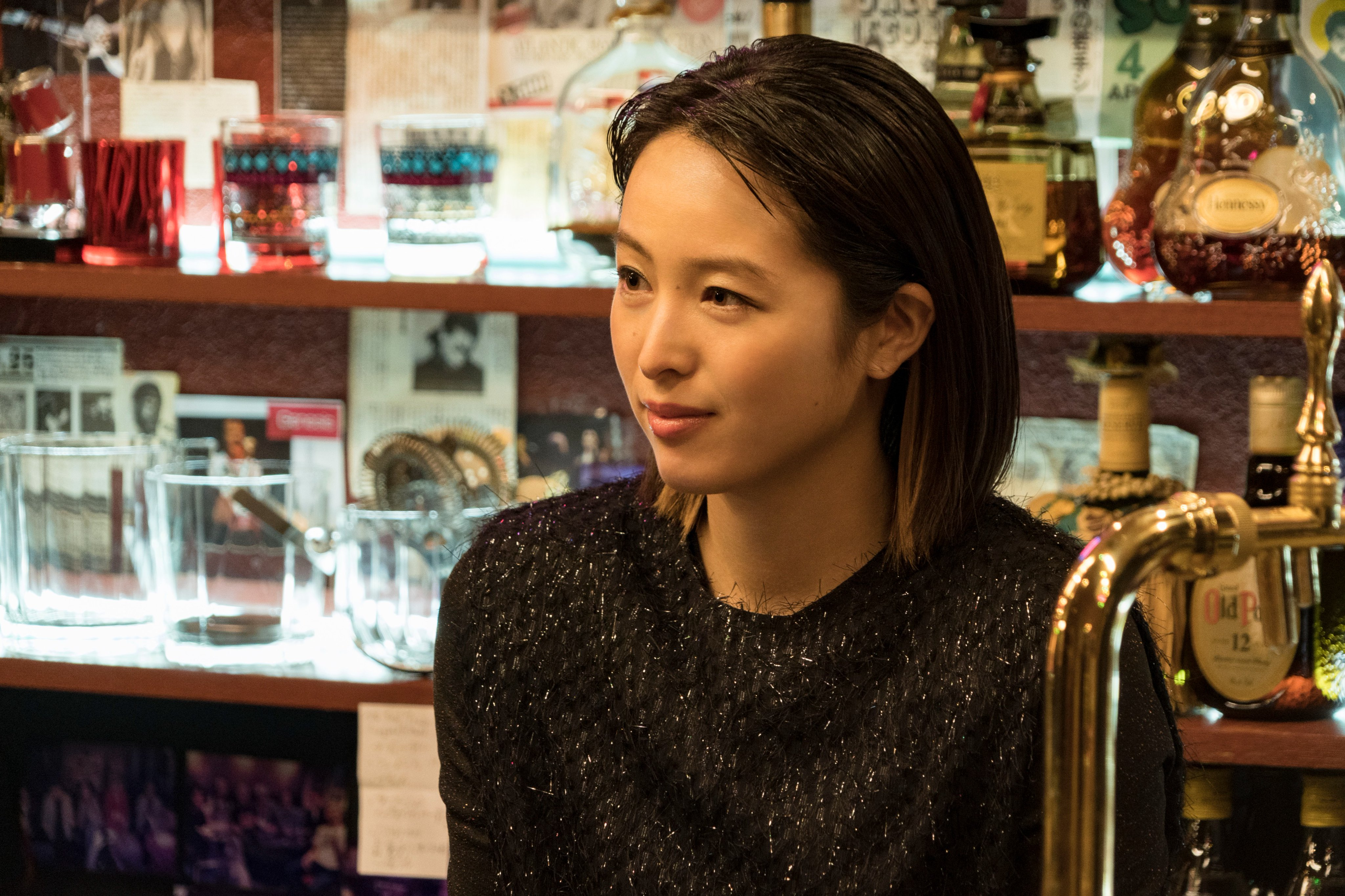
- Nana Seino in A Man (2022)
- Born: October 14, 1994 (age 32); Inazawa, Aichi, Japan
- Occupation: Actress
- Years active: 2007–present (as model); 2011–present (as actress)
- Notable credits: Tokyo Tribe; Ouroboros; Totto-Chan!; Kingdom series
- Spouse: Toma Ikuta (m. 2020)
- Children: 1

Nana Seino (清野 菜名, Seino Nana; born October 14, 1994) is a Japanese actress. She has played Sunmi in Tokyo Tribe, Tetsuko Kuroyanagi in the TV Asahi adaptation of Kuroyanagi's autobiography Totto-Chan: The Little Girl at the Window, and Yuko Komiya in the 98th NHK asadora Half Blue Sky, among numerous other TV and film roles.

== Early life and education ==
Seino was born on October 14, 1994, in Inazawa, Aichi, Japan. During her middle school years, although she was a member of the basketball team, she often participated in track and field events as well. In particular, she competed at the national level in the high jump. This athletic ability became one of the key factors contributing to her success as one of Japan's rare action actresses. She started her entertainment career in 2007 as an exclusive model for the girls' fashion magazine Pichilemon. At the age of 15 Seino moved from Aichi to Tokyo alone, later graduating from Japan Arts High School. When she saw Resident Evil, she admired Milla Jovovich, and soon became a pupil of Tak Sakaguchi, who is an action choreographer and actor.

== Career ==
Seino made her television acting debut in 2011 as Momoka Kurakano in the Tokyo Broadcasting System Television adaptation of Bisco Hatori's manga series Ouran High School Host Club. After minor roles in two films, she successfully auditioned for the role of Sunmi in the 2014 Sono Sion action film Tokyo Tribe, a "hip-hop musical" about warring Tokyo gangs, adapted from Santa Inoue's manga series. While Variety's Dennis Harvey described Sunmi as "a secretive stranger" who becomes "an unstoppable killing machine when ill treated," Martin Tsai of the Los Angeles Times suggested that Sunmi's only reason to be in the movie was "to flash her undergarment every time she does a roundhouse kick that inadvertently lifts up her skirt." A second supporting action role, as Mari in the Shusuke Kaneko film Danger Dolls, followed. At the 36th Yokohama Film Festival Seino won a Best Newcomer award for her work in Tokyo Tribe and Danger Dolls. Later in 2014 Seino turned 20 years old while playing the supporting role of Kanna Seki in the Fuji TV drama Time Taxi.

The next year Seino played the lead role of Ai in Mamoru Oshii's bullying revenge film Nowhere Girl, as well as supporting roles in the TV Tokyo drama Love Theory, the TBS adaptation of the manga series Dr. Storks, the TBS police drama Ouroboros, and the Yoshihiro Nishimura historical film The Ninja War of Torakage. In 2016 she played the lead role in the short 4DX horror film Rain Woman and the supporting role of Jaku in Kankurō Kudō's afterlife comedy Too Young To Die!.

Seino landed her first lead role in a television series as Tetsuko Kuroyanagi in Totto-Chan!, the 2017 TV Asahi adaptation of Kuroyanagi's autobiographical memoir Totto-Chan: The Little Girl at the Window. That same year she starred in the film Perfect Revolution as Mitsu, a mentally ill prostitute who falls in love with a man who has cerebral palsy. In 2018 Seino appeared as Yuko Komiya in several episodes of the 98th NHK asadora Half Blue Sky, and as Riko Akasaka in NTV's adaptation of the Hiroyuki Nishimori manga series From Today, It's My Turn!!

== Personal life ==
Seino married actor Toma Ikuta on June 1, 2020. On March 9, 2022, she announced that she gave birth to her first child.

== Filmography ==
=== Film ===
Year	Title	Role	Notes	Ref.
2012	Ochiki	Hanako		
2012	Ouran High School Host Club	Momoka Kurakano		
2014	Tokyo Tribe	Sunmi		
2014	Danger Dolls	Mari		
2014	Wood Job!	Takahashi		
2015	Nowhere Girl	Ai	Lead role	
2015	The Ninja War of Torakage	Onijuji		
2016	Ame-Onna	Rika	Lead role	
2016	Too Young To Die!	Jako		
2016	The Dark Maidens	Shiyo Takaoka		
2017	Perfect Revolution	Mitsu	Lead role	
2017	Yurigokoro	Chie		
2018	After the Rain	Haruka Kyan		
2020	From Today, It's My Turn!!	Riko Akasaka		
2021	DIVOC-12		Anthology film	
2022	A Man	Misuzu Gotō		
2022	Kingdom 2: Far and Away	Qiang Lei		
2022	Offbeat Cops	Haruko		
2022	Whisper of the Heart	24-year-old Shizuku Tsukishima	Lead role	
2023	Kingdom 3: The Flame of Destiny	Qiang Lei		
2024	Kingdom 4: Return of the Great General	Qiang Lei		
2026	Sheep in the Box	Alice Kotaki		
2026	Sukiyaki	Junko Nakamura		
2026	Kingdom 5: The Clash of Souls	Qiang Lei		

=== Japanese dub ===
Year	Title	Role	Notes	Ref.
2025	Elio	Olga Solis		

=== Television ===
Year	Title	Role	Notes	Ref.
2011	Ouran High School Host Club	Momoka Kurakano		
2013	Garo: Yami o Terasu Mono	Shiori	Episode 10	
2014	Time Taxi	Kanna Seki		
2015	Ouroboros	Konatsu Tamura		
2015	Love Theory	Reiko Kiritani		
2015	Dr. Storks	Mayumi Kadota		
2016	Happy Marriage!?	Chiwa Takanashi		
2017	Totto-chan!	Tetsuko Kuroyanagi	Lead role	
2018	Half Blue Sky	Yuko Komiya	Asadora	
2018	From Today, It's My Turn!!	Riko Akasaka		
2020	Panda Judges the World	Ren Kawata / Miss Panda	Lead role	
2020	Daddy is My Classmate	Senior from the dance club	Cameo	
2021	Only Just Married	Akiha Ōkado	Lead role	
2021	In His Chart	Haruna Kurihara	Mini-series	
2021–24	No Activity	Arira Ōhira	2 seasons	
2023	At Least On Sunday Night	Sachi Kishida	Lead role	
2025–27	119: Emergency Call	Yuki Kasuhara	Lead role; 2 seasons	

== Awards and nominations ==
Year	Award	Category	Work(s)	Result	Ref.
2015	36th Yokohama Film Festival	Best Newcomer	Tokyo Tribe and Danger Dolls	Won	
2022	35th Nikkan Sports Film Awards	Best Supporting Actress	Kingdom 2: Far and Away, A Man and others	Won	
2023	65th Blue Ribbon Awards	Best Supporting Actress	Kingdom 2: Far and Away, A Man and others	Won	
2023	46th Japan Academy Film Prize	Best Supporting Actress	A Man	Nominated	
2023	46th Japan Academy Film Prize	Best Supporting Actress	Kingdom 2: Far and Away	Nominated	
