= Ouroboros (disambiguation) =

Ouroboros is an ancient symbol depicting a snake or dragon swallowing its tail.

Ouroboros or Ouroborus may also refer to:

== Entertainment ==
=== Film and television ===
- Ouroboros (manga), a Japanese seinen manga and anime by Kanzaki Yuuya
  - Ouroboros (TV series), a 2015 Japanese television drama based on the manga
- "Ouroboros", an episode of the TV series Andromeda
- "Ouroboros", an episode of the TV series Charlie Jade
- "Ouroboros" (Fear the Walking Dead), an episode of the TV series Fear the Walking Dead
- "Ouroboros" (Red Dwarf), an episode of the TV series Red Dwarf
- Ouroboros (Shameless), an episode of the American TV series Shameless
- "Ouroboros" (Loki), an episode of the TV series Loki

=== Music ===
- Uroboros (band), a Japanese visual kei rock band
- Oroboros, a jam band by Jim Miller
- Ouroboros: Seasons of Life—Women's Passages, an oratorio by Kay Gardner
- Uroboros (album), a 2008 album by Dir en grey
- Ouroboros (Ray LaMontagne album), 2016
- "Oroborus", a song by Gojira from the 2008 album The Way of All Flesh
- "Ouroboros", a song by Demon Hunter from the 2025 album There Was a Light Here
- "Ouroboros", a song by the Mars Volta from the 2008 album The Bedlam in Goliath

=== Other arts and entertainment ===
- The Worm Ouroboros, a 1922 novel by E. R. Eddison
- Ouroboros or The Mechanical Extension of Mankind, a 1926 novel by Garet Garrett
- Uroboros (sculpture), a 1979 sculpture by Charles Kibby

=== Fictional characters and objects ===
- Mr. Ouroboros, a Marvel Comics character in the Time Variance Authority
  - Ouroboros (Marvel Cinematic Universe), the version of the character in the Loki TV series
- Ouroboros, a massive station in Mega Man ZX Advent
- Ouroboros, the overarching antagonists of the Trails series
- Ouroboros, the mecha-like transformations of the main characters in Xenoblade Chronicles 3
- Uroboros, the viral bioweapon used by Albert Wesker in Resident Evil 5 and Dead by Daylight

== Other uses ==
- Ouroboros (protocol), the proof of stake blockchain algorithm
- Ouroborus, a reptile genus containing the armadillo girdled lizard
- Ouroboros, a community weblog devoted to research in the biology of aging; see SAGE KE § Ouroboros
