= 36th Yokohama Film Festival =

2015 film festival in Yokohama, Japan

- Location: Yokohama, Kanagawa, Japan
- Founded: 1980
- Festival date: 2015

The 36th Yokohama Film Festival (第36回ヨコハマ映画祭) was held in 2015 in Yokohama, Kanagawa, Japan.

== Awards ==
- Best Film: - The Light Shines Only There
- Best Director:
  - Mipo O - The Light Shines Only There
  - Momoko Andō - 0.5mm
- Yoshimitsu Morita Memorial Best New Director: Nao Kubota - Homeland
- Best Screenplay: Ryō Takada - The Light Shines Only There and Silver Spoon
- Best Cinematographer: Ryūto Kondō - The Light Shines Only There and My Man
- Best Actor: Gō Ayano - The Light Shines Only There
- Best Actress: Rie Miyazawa - Pale Moon
- Best Supporting Actor: Sosuke Ikematsu - Pale Moon and Our Family
- Best Supporting Actress:
  - Satomi Kobayashi - Pale Moon
  - Yuko Oshima - Pale Moon
- Best Newcomer:
  - Mugi Kadowaki - Love's Whirlpool, Ushijima the Loan Shark Part 2, Shanti Days: 365-nichi, Shiawase no Kokyū
  - Nana Seino - Tokyo Tribe and Danger Dolls
  - Ema Sakura - Bon to Lin chan
  - Mahiro Takasugi - Bon to Lin chan
- Special Grand Prize: Masahiko Tsugawa

== Best 10 ==
1. The Light Shines Only There
2. Pale Moon
3. 0.5mm
4. Wood Job!
5. My Man
6. Our Family
7. Love's Whirlpool
8. Homeland
9. Seven Weeks
10. Au revoir l'été

runner-up: Lady Maiko
