= Shinjuku Swan II =

- Film poster
- 新宿スワン II
- Directed by: Sion Sono
- Written by: Mataichirō Yamamoto
- Based on: Shinjuku Swan by Ken Wakui
- Produced by: Mataichirō Yamamoto
- Starring: Gō Ayano; Tadanobu Asano
- Production company: Tristone Entertainment Inc.
- Distributed by: Sony Pictures Entertainment Japan
- Release date: January 21, 2017; (Japan)
- Running time: 133 minutes
- Country: Japan
- Language: Japanese

Shinjuku Swan II (新宿スワン II) is a 2017 Japanese comedy film directed by Sion Sono based on the manga Shinjuku Swan by Ken Wakui. It was released in Japan on January 21, 2017. It is the sequel to Shinjuku Swan (2015), also directed by Sion Sono.

== Plot ==
One year has passed since the death of Hideyoshi. Sumitomo, president of the All Japan Liquor Merchants Association, announces plans to open a new gentleman's club in Yokohama. Tatsuhiko, a scout from the Burst scouting agency who recruits girls for the adult entertainment business, moves from Shinjuku to Yokohama to recruit girls and expand the agency's business there. There he comes into conflict with Masaki Taki, the CEO of the Wizard scouting agency of Yokohama who is also seeking to recruit girls for the opening of the new gentleman's club and is unhappy about the unknown upstart stepping into his turf.
Seki once took the fall for a murder rap for Taki and has avoided Yokohama for 12 years for this purpose. When he returns, Taki takes it as a declaration of war. Taki is protected by Inspector Sunako of the Yokohama Central Police as well as President Tasaka of the Monbu group and uses them to push the Burst scouts out of his territory. Taki also sends the Wizard agency to take over the Burst territory in Shinjuku, where they destroy Madame Ryoko's club. Taki ends up shooting President Tasaka in a disagreement over money and territorial control. The association holds a beauty contest in Yokohama but Burst only has half as many girls recruited in Yokohama as the Wizard agency so Madame Ryoko sends the girls not currently working at her destroyed club to Yokohama to compete in the contest as well. The beauty contest is won by burst but Tatsuhiko has already left early in order to go protect his old friend Yosuke.
Meanwhile, Taki's girl is having a relationship with Yosuke, which Taki permits as long as Yosuke is dealing drugs for him. Yosuke becomes hooked on drugs and it is decided that he will make one last deal before retiring. Fearing that he will be killed, Taki's girl tells him to run after the deal is done but Yosuke wants to remain with her. When Taki arrives, Seki appears to defend Yosuke and confront Taki for kicking him out of Yokohama 12 years earlier. As they are fighting, a gun falls out of Taki's pocket and is picked up by Yosuke. Tatsuhiko arrives and fights with Taki as well before Taki ultimately tells Seki that he had been missing him and tells Seki that he should be the boss of the Wizard agency instead and gives him the keys to his office.
Distraught about his future, Yosuke points a gun at Taki but the others convince him not to shoot. Instead, Arai of the Monbu group shoots Taki in retaliation for the killing of the President Tasaka. Arai says that he will turn himself into the police and Tatsuhiko flees with Yosuke. They bump into Hayama, who reminds Yosuke that Yosuke had Hideyoshi killed for getting him hooked on drugs. Hayama refuses to let Yosuke join Burst again and begins to fight Tatsuhiko before Yosuke confesses that he did indeed have Hideyoshi killed. In Taki's office Seki finds a letter addressed to him from Taki telling him his plans to flee from Yokohama just as Seki did 12 years earlier. He ends the letter by stating that he is returning Yokohama to Seki.

== Cast ==
- Gō Ayano as Tatsuhiko Shiratori
- Tadanobu Asano as Masaki Taki
- Motoki Fukami as Gensuke Seki
- Alice Hirose as Mayumi Ozawa
- Yūsuke Iseya as Mako
- Yūsuke Kamiji as Chisato Morinaga
- Jun Kaname
- Nobuaki Kaneko Yutaka Hayama
- Akihiro Kitamura as Moriken
- Jun Murakami as Tokimasa
- Hideo Nakano
- Takashi Sasano
- Kippei Shiina as Sumitomo
- Maryjun Takahashi as Arisa
- Kosuke Toyohara as Jin Yamashiro
- Yū Yamada
- Yuki Kubota as Yosuke

== Release ==
The film was released in Japan on January 21, 2017. It was later featured at the Eejanaika Toyohashi Film Festival on March 3, 2017, twice at the Taipei Golden Horse Film Festival on November 3 and 4, 2017, and the San Diego Asian Film Festival on November 22, 2017.

== Box office ==
It was number three at the Japanese box office in its first week of release, earning $1.42 million.

== Reception ==
Eric Lallana of the San Diego Asian Film Festival writes that the film is "Sono at his most populist" and that the manga adaptation is "told with reverence for the material and the spirit of the stars." He describes that "Sono offers generous concern for how power and security are woven between the yakuza, big business, the cops, and the pimpery class."
Josiah Hughes of the Canadian entertainment magazine Exclaim! writes that the film "often feels episodic, moving from one narrative arc to another in its exhausting 133-minute runtime. Despite its lack of traditional structure, however, the film is packed with colourful backdrops, explosive action scenes and comedy both intentional and, perhaps, unintentional."

== Home video ==
The film was released on DVD and Blu-ray on July 4, 2017.
