= Kuroyanagi Chō =

- 黒柳 朝
- Kuroyanagi in 1938 with her daughter Tetsuko and husband Moritsuna
- Born: Kadoyama Chō; 6 September 1910; Takikawa, Hokkaido, Japan
- Died: August 16, 2006 (aged 95); Tokyo, Japan
- Occupation: Essayist
- Spouse: Kuroyanagi Moritsuna
- Children: 5
- Writing career
- Language: Japanese
- Period: 1982 – 2006

Kuroyanagi Chō, also known as Chocchan, (黒柳 朝; née Kadoyama; 6 September 1910 – 16 August 2006) was a Japanese autobiographical essayist and the mother of actress Tetsuko Kuroyanagi.

== Early life ==
Kuroyanagi was born 6 September, 1910, in Takikawa, Hokkaido to father Kadoyama Shūtsū, a clinician, and mother Miyoshi. She was their oldest daughter. The Kadoyama family had been retainers to the Dewa-Matsuyama Domain for generations. Her grandfather, Shūchi, studied medicine in Tokyo before returning to his hometown of Matsuyama, Yamagata to open a practice; he also served as a town councilor. Shūtsū, his second son, graduated from the Tohoku University School of Medicine before moving to Hokkaido and opening a gynecological practice. He also had an interest in music; he was skilled in Noh chanting and playing the shakuhachi and violin.

As a child, Kuroyanagi moved to Sendai with her mother when her mother re-enrolled in the mission school Miyagi Girls' School. During this time, Kuroyanagi attended Sendai Higashinibancho Elementary School. After her mother's graduation two years later, the two returned to Hokkaido. In 1923, she enrolled in Iwamizawa Girls' High School (now Hokkaido Iwamizawa Nishi High School) and lived for four years in a dormitory.

== Marriage and family life ==
In 1927, on the recommendation of a music instructor, she moved to Tokyo and enrolled in the Tokyo Conservatory of Music (now the Tokyo College of Music). She stayed with an aunt and uncle. During her third year of studies, she met the head violinist of the New Symphony Orchestra, Kuroyanagi Moritsuna, who invited her to tea before asking her to come to his apartment. Kuroyanagi felt it was rude to refuse and agreed to go with him. She recalled that when she tried to leave, she discovered that it was too late to catch a train home, and, having no money for a taxi, felt forced to stay with him. Moritsuna reportedly kept her in his apartment for five days before taking her to work with him, during which time Kuroyanagi felt unable to return to her relatives and explain that she had stayed in a strange man's room for fear of their reaction. A friend, Noriko Awaya, came across her, told her that her family was deeply concerned, and asked what had happened. Afterward, Moritsuna sent a relative to her parents to formally propose marriage.

In her later essays, Kuroyanagi described her attitude toward his proposal as being ambivalent and timid, especially after her father reacted with fury. Another issue was that her mother wanted Moritsuna to convert to Christianity. However, his deceased father had been a devout Christian, so they were able to resolve the problem of faith.

The couple married and began to live together. Kuroyanagi dropped out of her music course. They had four children by 1944: eldest daughter Tetsuko, eldest son Meiji, and a second son and daughter. Meiji died in May 1944 from septicemia.

In 1944, Moritsuna was drafted and sent to the Chinese front. On 10 March, 1945, due to the bombing of Tokyo, Kuroyanagi evacuated the family to Suwanotaira in Sannohe District, Aomori, where a friend of the family lived. There, she made a living selling produce in Hachinohe, and after the end of the war that year, she sold the produce to Tokyo. Her husband was kept as a Soviet prisoner of war, and he was repatriated in 1949. He became the concertmaster of the Tokyo Symphony Orchestra. Afterward, the couple had a fifth child, a third son, and Kuroyanagi became a member of the Yukinoshita Church of the United Church of Christ in Japan.

== Essayist career and later life ==
Kuroyanagi came to public attention due to the publication of her eldest daughter Tetsuko's best-selling book about her childhood, Totto-Chan: The Little Girl at the Window. In 1982, she began a career as an essayist with the serialization of humorous autobiographical essays that described experiences such as raising her children in the magazine "Life and Home Ladies" (Japanese: 主婦と生活, romanized: Shufu to seikatsu). Her essays were collected into a book and published that year, and it became a best-seller. In 1987, her work was adapted for a NHK asadora drama series.

After Mortisuna died in 1983, a memorial concert was held for him in Los Angeles. Kuroyanagi went to the United States and Canada for a lecture tour in Japanese expatriate and religious communities. In 1993, she published "The Story of Chocchan" (Japanese: チョッちゃん物語, romanized: Chocchan monogatari). It was adapted into an animated film directed by Hiroko Tokita, released in 1996, about her experiences before and during World War II.

Kuroyanagi was an honorary citizen of her hometown, Takikawa, Hokkaido. She had an interest in collecting Western antique artworks due to her lifelong familiarity with Christian culture, and she donated the "Chocchan Antique Collection" of about 600 works of art to the city.

She died of heart failure on 16 August, 2006, aged 95, in a Tokyo hospital.

== Publications ==
- Chocchan ga iku wa yo チョッちゃんが行くわよ [Here Comes Choccan] (in Japanese). 主婦と生活社. 1 December 1982. ISBN 978-4-391-10620-6. ndldm:12194482.
- Chocchan datte yaru wa チョッちゃんだってやるわ [Even Chocchan Will Do It] (in Japanese). 朝日新聞社. 1 May 1987. ISBN 978-4-12-207281-7.
- Baaba yo taishi o idake バァバよ大志をいだけ [Grandma, Have Some Ambitions] (in Japanese). 主婦と生活社. 20 September 1986. ISBN 978-4-12-207354-8. ndldm:12190417.
- Chocchan no koko made kita michi チョッちゃんのここまで来た道 [The Path Chocchan Has Travel Thus Far] (in Japanese). 講談社. 24 July 1987. ISBN 9784062034685. ndldm:12191403.
- Chocchan no kokoro was itsumo Colombus チョッちゃんの心はいつもコロンブス [Chocchan's Heart is Always Like Colombus] (in Japanese). 主婦と生活社. 1987. ISBN 978-4391110319.
- Chocchan no watashi was kokoro no hanasaka baaba チョッちゃんの私は心の花咲かバァバ [I, Chocchan, am the Grandma Who Makes Hearts Bloom] (in Japanese). リヨン社. 1989. ISBN 978-4576890173.
- Totto-chan to watashi トットちゃんと私 [Totto-chan and I] (in Japanese). 主婦と生活社. 1990. ISBN 978-4391112658.
- Hana ga atta kara itsumo shiawase datta 花があったからいつも倖せだった [We were always happy because we had flowers] (in Japanese). 文化出版局. 1991. ISBN 978-4579303311.
- Majokko Choccan―tabi no manimani 魔女っ子チョッちゃん―旅のまにまに [Little Witch Chocchan: Wherever the Journey Takes Me] (in Japanese). 主婦と生活社. 1992. ISBN 978-4391114898.
- Chocchan monogatari チョッちゃん物語 [The Story of Chocchan] (in Japanese). 金の星社. 1993. ISBN 978-4323018553.
- Chocchan wa mou jiki hyakusai チョッちゃんは、もうじき100歳 [Soon Chocchan will be 100] (in Japanese). 主婦と生活社. 1 September 2006. ISBN 978-4391132908.
