= Boku no Kotoba Dewanai Kore wa Boku-tachi no Kotoba =

2015 single by Uverworld

- The regular edition cover

Single by Uverworld

from the album TYCOON
- B-side: "It's Understood Without Saying It, That Was a Little"
- Released: May 27, 2015
- Recorded: 2015
- Genre: J-pop
- Lyricist: Takuya

Alternative cover
- Limited time production edition

"Boku no Kotoba Dewanai Kore wa Boku-tachi no Kotoba" (Japanese: 僕の言葉ではない これは僕達の言葉; lit. These Aren't My Words, They're Our Words") is a Japanese song by Uverworld. It was released as their 27th single on May 27, 2015, by Sony Music Records while promoting the anime series The Heroic Legend of Arslan. Besides the regular edition, it also saw two alternate versions meant to promote the anime. Its official music video was made by Masayoshi Ohkita and released in July 2015.

The song was primarily made by Uverworld vocalist Takuya who came up with the series in a dream. Despite the band's popularity, "Boku no Kotoba Dewanai Kore wa Boku-tachi no Kotoba" enjoyed mixed responses for its translation to the TV version which resulted in both criticism and the subject of jokes by streaming websites.

== Background and release ==
"Boku no Kotoba Dewanai Kore wa Boku-tachi no Kotoba" is Uverworld's first single of 2015, approximately one year after their previous single, "7-nichime no Ketsui", and about 11 months after their 8th album, Ø CHOIR. The title track, "Boku no Kotoba de wa Nai Kore wa Bokutachi no Kotoba", was the opening theme for the first season of the anime series The Heroic Legend of Arslan airing on Mainichi Broadcasting System (MBS) and TBS Television (TBS). The coupling track, "Collide", was used as an insert song in the 2015 film Shinjuku Swan. This marks the band's sixth time providing a theme song for an anime series airing on MBS on Saturday evenings at 6 PM and Sunday evenings at 5 PM. The band began production with the concept of "creating a song with a message". TAKUYA∞ stated that in 2015 he wants to write music that clearly conveys a message, like "MONDO PIECE" and "The 7th Day's Resolve". His motivation is "because it feels good to perform songs with a message at live shows and draw the audience in". Therefore, they made it clear what they wanted to convey just by looking at the song title.

The single was released in three formats: a limited first edition, a regular edition, and a limited-time production edition (anime edition). The limited first edition's bonus DVD includes the "7th Day's Resolve vol.01" music video and making-of footage, as well as a recording of "The Form That Should Be There" from their live performance at Koriyama HIP SHOT JAPAN on February 22, 2015. The limited-time production edition features an original illustration from The Heroic Legend of Arslan. Despite being released in three formats, its cumulative sales fell below that of their anime tie-in single, "Endscape", which had the lowest cumulative sales. However, the music video has surpassed 10 million views on YouTube.

To commemorate the release of this work, the 15th anniversary of the band's formation, and the 10th anniversary of their debut, a special program, UVER Family TV, was streamed on Nico Nico Live on June 5, 2015. The song was first included on the original album TYCOON, released on August 2, 2017, and it took 2 years and 2 months to be included on the album. As of 2021, this is the longest waiting period for a song's inclusion.

== Contents ==
=== First press limited edition / Regular edition ===
All lyrics are written by TAKUYA∞.

CD
No.	Title	Music	Length
1.	"These are not my words, these are our words"	TAKUYA∞	4:18
2.	"It will be understood without saying it, that was a bit of a lie"	TAKUYA∞	6:25
3.	"Collide"	Akira / TAKUYA∞	3:30
Total length:			14:15

DVD (First Press Limited Edition)
No.	Title	Length
1.	"The 7th Day's Resolution vol.1"
2.	"The 7th Day's Resolution vol.1 Making-of Video"
3.	"The Way It Should Be Live at Koriyama HIP SHOT JAPAN 2015.2.22"

=== Limited edition ===
CD
No.	Title	Length
1.	"These Are Not My Words, These Are Our Words"	4:18
2.	"It's Understood Without Saying It, That Was a Little Lie"	6:25
3.	"Collide"	3:34
4.	"These Are Not My Words, These Are Our Words (TV size)"	1:30
Total length:		15:49

=== Extra edition ===
Digital Download
No.	Title	Length
1.	"These Are Not My Words, These Are Our Words"	4:18
2.	"It's conveyed without saying it, that was a bit of a lie."	6:25
3.	"Collide"	3:34
4.	"These aren't my words, these are our words (TV size)"	1:33
5.	"IMPACT mixed by Dave Schiffman"	4:26
Total length:		20:16

== Concept ==
"Boku no Kotoba de wa nai, Kore wa Bokutachi no Kotoba" was created based on a song that appeared in a dream Takuya from Uverworld. All members provide backing vocals. Guest vocalists include YAFUMI from LAID BACK OCEAN, Noriko Setagaya from Aiemu, and Takuya Hoshi from The Hitch Lowke, all of whom are have worked with the same aspirations like Takuya. The three have also made guest appearances at UVERworld's live shows. Takuya says that the staff of The Heroic Legend of Arslan didn't give any specific requests other than that there be a lot of band sound. The song "Backstage Pass July 2015" sings that UVERworld's message belongs not only to Takuya but to all the members. UVERworld wanted to compose a theme about struggling while envisioning the story of Arslan.

A music video directed by Masayoshi Ohkita was produced and released on YouTube on June 9, 2015. In addition to the band members, guest vocalists and 200 fans participated as extras in the MV. While the video gives the impression that the extras are singing in turn, they weren't actually singing the song; instead, they were asked to say the song title and their favorite words in front of the camera, and the clips were edited together. Director Ohkita stated he wanted to express the idea of everyone singing together, as the song title suggests, and treating the extras as "individuals". It is conveyed without saying it, that was a bit of a lie. The song created by TAKUYA at his family home after leaving Tokyo. Initially, it was an acoustic version, but it took its current form after Akira arranged it with a band sound. TAKUYA∞ said, "It's a song I couldn't have made before." The music video was released on the June 19th on GYAO!. The song's first live performance was during the arena tour. The following year, "Collide" was used as an insert song in the film Shinjuku Swan. The song was created to be suitable for the fight scenes. Having previously heard from the film's star, Go Ayano, that he "liked the sound of their voices when they were shouting during live performances", they incorporated screamo elements. According to Akira, "It shows our current, more orthodox style.". Unlike "It's Understood Without Saying It, That's a Little Lie", it has been frequently performed live since its release. During the live intro, all members except TAKUYA play percussion.

== Participating musicians ==
- UVERworld: Chorus
- TAKUYA∞: Vocal
- Katsuya: Guitar
- Akira: Guitar
- Nobuto: Bass
- Shintaro: Drum Set
- Seika: Saxophone

Support musicians

- Yasuharu Nakanishi: Piano
- YAFUMI: Chorus
- Hoshi☆Takuya: Chorus
- Noriko Setagaya: Chorus

== Response ==
Josh Piedra from the OuterHeaven acclaimed the musical theme by Uverwworld. However, Piedra expressed mixed thoughts when comparing both TV version and full theme, believing one the latter has better production values as a result of multiple ecchos of and vocals. Rose Bridges from Anime News Network heavily criticized the music theme for not fitting the anime.

In the book China’s Youth Cultures and Collective Spaces, Seio Nakajima noted the opening theme by Uverworld was popular in Nico Nico Douga and Bilibili platforms for its use of English that led to fan to write their own misheard lyrics when watching the anime. Piedra believes this is a parody of the poor production values the TV version suffers and looked forward an improved version, citing a similar problem from a song by Linked Horizon used to for the release of the anime Attack on Titan.
