= Dorothy Britton =

Dorothy Guyver Britton, Lady Bouchier MBE (14 February 1922 – 25 February 2015) was born in Yokohama and went to the Yokohama International School, moved to the United States at the age of 11, and was educated in the United States and England, returning to Japan after the American Occupation. She was best known as a translator into English of Tetsuko Kuroyanagi's Madogiwa no Totto-chan as Totto-chan, the Little Girl at the Window, and Oku no Hosomichi by Basho: A Haiku Journey – Basho's Narrow Road to a Far Province. She was the author of The Japanese Crane: Bird of Happiness and co-author of National Parks of Japan.

Dorothy Britton was also a poet and composer, and was a pupil of Darius Milhaud. She was known for her popular album Japanese Sketches, in which Tetsuko Kuroyanagi's father is violin soloist.

Her husband, Air Vice Marshal Sir Cecil ("Boy") Bouchier, was a senior Royal Air Force officer and a station commander during the Battle of Britain.

Lady Bouchier was appointed Member of the Order of the British Empire (MBE) in the 2010 Birthday Honours.

To commemorate her legacy, a street in Markham, Canada was named after her.

== Selected translations ==
- Tomiko Higa – The Girl with the White Flag
- Tsuneo Hayashida – The Japanese Crane: Bird of Happiness
- Ryūnosuke Akutagawa – The Spider's Thread and Other Stories
- Matsuo Bashō – A Haiku Journey: Bashō's Narrow Road to a Far Province
- Tetsuko Kuroyanagi – Totto-chan, the Little Girl at the Window
- Princess Chichibu – The Silver Drum, A Japanese Imperial Memoir
- Takashi Kojima – Rashomon and Other Stories
- Chihiro Iwasaki – Chichiro's Album of Words and Pictures
