= Go Ayano =

Japanese actor

- 綾野 剛
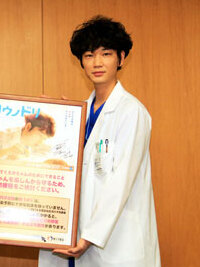
- Ayano in 2015
- Born: January 26, 1982 (age 44); Gifu Prefecture, Japan
- Occupation: Actor
- Years active: 2003–present
- Spouse: Yui Sakuma (m. 2022)
- Children: 1

Go Ayano (綾野 剛, Ayano Gō; born January 26, 1982) is a Japanese actor.

== Career ==
Ayano was featured in several roles beginning in 2003. In 2009, he appeared in Takashi Miike's Crows Zero 2. His role in the film was described by Mark Schilling of The Japan Times as "a tall, pale-faced, delicately featured boy who looks like Michael Jackson's Japanese cousin, but fights like Bruce Lee." He was later cast in Shun Oguri's directorial debut, Surely Someday (2010).

Ayano co-starred in Takefumi Tsutsui's In a Lonely Planet (2011) with Aya Takeko and Takayo Mimura. He appeared in Mika Ninagawa's Helter Skelter (2012), and had supporting roles in Eriko Kitagawa's I Have to Buy New Shoes (2012) and Shuichi Okita's Yokomichi Yonosuke (2013).

In 2013, Ayano starred in two of his highest profile roles to date: as George "Joe" Asakura in Gatchaman, a live-action adaptation of the classic Tatsunoko Productions anime, and as Ishikawa Goemon in Lupin III, adapted from the iconic manga by Monkey Punch and directed by Ryuhei Kitamura.

In 2016, Ayano was cast as the lead character, Nyx Ulric, in the feature film Kingsglaive: Final Fantasy XV.

== Personal life ==
On December 31, 2022, Ayano announced that he had married actress Yui Sakuma. On March 30, 2024, Ayano and Sakuma jointly announced that they had welcomed their first child.

== Filmography ==
=== Film ===
Year	Title	Role	Notes	Ref.
2005	Nana			
2006	Black Kiss			
2007	Life	Isamu Takita	Lead role	
2008	Aquarian Age	Amemiya		
2008	Love Exposure			
2008	Be a Man! Samurai School	Hien		
2008	Naoko	Susumu Kuroda		
2009	Tajomaru			
2009	Crows Zero 2	Ryo Urushibara		
2010	Shibuya		Lead role	
2010	Surely Someday			
2011	Gantz			
2011	Usagi Drop			
2011	A Man with Style			
2011	Me o Tojite Gira Gira		Lead role	
2011	In a Lonely Planet	Tetsuo	Lead role	
2012	Hasami			
2012	Helter Skelter	Shin'ichi Okumura		
2012	Rurouni Kenshin	Gein		
2012	I Have to Buy New Shoes	Kango		
2012	The Samurai That Night			
2012	Working Holiday			
2013	The Story of Yonosuke	Katō		
2013	Gatchaman	George "Joe" Asakura		
2013	Flower of Shanidar	Kenji Ōtaki	Lead role	
2014	Lupin III	Goemon Ishikawa XIII		
2014	The Light Shines Only There	Tatsuo	Lead role	
2014	The Perfect Insider	Sōhei Saikawa		
2014	Ushijima the Loan Shark Part 2	Inui		
2015	S The Last Policeman - Recovery of Our Future	Iori Soga		
2015	Piece of Cake	Kyōshirō Sugahara		
2015	The Big Bee	Isao Saika		
2015	Shinjuku Swan	Tatsuhiko Shiratori	Lead role	
2016	64: Part I	Suwa		
2016	64: Part II	Suwa		
2016	Rage	Naoto		
2016	A Bride for Rip Van Winkle	Yukimasu Amuro		
2016	Twisted Justice	Moroboshi	Lead role	
2016	Kingsglaive: Final Fantasy XV	Nyx Ulric (voice)	Lead role	
2017	The Last Recipe	Yanagisawa		
2017	Mukoku	Kengo Yatabe	Lead role	
2017	Shinjuku Swan II	Tatsuhiko Shiratori	Lead role	
2017	Ajin: Demi-Human	Satō		
2018	Punk Samurai Slash Down	Jūnoshin Kake	Lead role	
2019	The Promised Land	Takeshi Nakamura	Lead role	
2019	Family of Strangers	Chūya Tsukamoto		
2020	Beneath the Shadow	Kon'no	Lead role	
2020	The Legacy of Dr. Death: Black File	Hayato Inukai	Lead role	
2021	A Family	Kenji Yamamoto	Lead role	
2021	Homunculus	Susumu Nakoshi	Lead role	
2023	Hard Days	Takayuki Yazaki		
2023	A Spoiling Rain	Tochitani	Lead role	
2024	Let's Go Karaoke!	Kyoji Narita	Lead role	
2024	Last Mile	Ai Ibuki		
2024	The Real You	Nakao		
2024	Maru	Yokoyama		
2024	Doctor-X: The Movie	Akihiko Kōno		
2025	Sham	Seiichi Yabushita	Lead role	
2025	Baka's Identity	Kenshi Kajitani		
2025	The Stars and Moon are Holes in the Sky	Katsuji Yazoe	Lead role	
2026	Mentor	Jun Nomoto		

=== Television ===
Year	Title	Role	Notes	Ref.
2003	Kamen Rider 555	Spider Orphenoch/Aki Sawada		
2006	Inugoe	Daiki Maeda	Lead role	
2010	Mother			
2010	Second Virgin			
2011	Heaven's Flower The Legend of Arcana			
2011	Downtown Rocket	Kensaku Mano		
2011	Carnation	Ryūichi Suō	Asadora	
2012	Pioneers	Kingi Abe		
2012	Cleopatra Ladies: Eternal Desire for Beauty	Yu Kuosaki		
2013	Yae's Sakura	Matsudaira Katamori	Taiga drama	
2013	Matrimonial Chaos	Ryō Uehara		
2013	Public Affairs Office in the Sky	Daisuke Sorai		
2013	Link			
2014	S: The Last Policeman	Iori Soga		
2014	The Long Goodbye			
2014–16	Ushijima the Loan Shark		Seasons 2 and 3	
2015–17	Dr. Storks	Sakura Kōnotori	Lead role; 2 seasons	
2017	Frankenstein's Love	The Monster	Lead role	
2018	Hagetaka	Masahiko Washizu	Lead role	
2020	MIU404	Ai Ibuki	Lead role	
2021	Love Deeply!	Rintarō Hasuda	Lead role	
2021	Kinnikuman: The Lost Legend	Himself		
2021	Avalanche	Seiici Habu	Lead role	
2022	The Journalist	Shin'ichi Murakami		
2023	YuYu Hakusho	Younger Toguro		
2024–27	Tokyo Swindlers	Takumi Tsujimoto	Lead role; 2 seasons	
2026	Song of the Samurai	Serizawa Kamo		

== Awards and nominations ==
Year	Award	Category	Work(s)	Result	Ref.
2013	6th Tokyo Drama Awards	Best Supporting Actor	Matrimonial Chaos	Won	
2014	37th Japan Academy Film Prize	Newcomer of the Year	A Story of Yonosuke and The End of Summer	Won	
2014	38th Elan d'or Awards	Newcomer of the Year	Himself	Won	
2014	22nd Hashida Awards	Best Newcomer	Matrimonial Chaos, Public Affairs Office in the Sky and Yae's Sakura	Won	
2015	69th Mainichi Film Awards	Best Actor	The Light Shines Only There	Won	
2015	88th Kinema Junpo Awards	Best Actor	The Light Shines Only There and The Snow White Murder Case	Won	
2015	36th Yokohama Film Festival	Best Actor	The Light Shines Only There	Won	
2015	7th Tama Film Awards	Best Actor	Shinjuku Swan, Piece of Cake and others	Won	
2016	15th New York Asian Film Festival	Rising Star Award	Himself	Won	
2016	41st Hochi Film Awards	Best Supporting Actor	Rage	Won	
2017	40th Japan Academy Film Prize	Best Actor	Twisted Justice	Nominated	
2020	43rd Japan Academy Film Prize	Best Supporting Actor	Family of Strangers	Nominated	
2025	48th Japan Academy Film Prize	Best Actor	Let's Go Karaoke!	Nominated	
2025	30th Busan International Film Festival	Best Actor Award	Baka's Identity	Won	
2026	39th Nikkan Sports Film Awards	Best Supporting Actor	Mentor	Pending	
