= The Snow White Murder Case =

- Poster
- Directed by: Yoshihiro Nakamura
- Written by: Tamio Hayashi
- Based on: Shirayuki hime Satsujin Jiken by Kanae Minato
- Produced by: Hideaki Miyoshi; Setsuko Sumida
- Starring: Mao Inoue; Gō Ayano; Nanao; Nobuaki Kaneko; Erena Ono; Mitsuki Tanimura; Shōta Sometani; Yoko Akino
- Cinematography: Gen Kobayashi
- Edited by: Isao Kawase
- Music by: Goro Yasukawa
- Distributed by: Shochiku Co., Ltd.
- Release date: March 29, 2014 (Japan)
- Running time: 126 minutes
- Country: Japan
- Language: Japanese
- Box office: ¥1 billion (US$8.6 million)

The Snow White Murder Case (Japanese: 白ゆき姫殺人事件, Hepburn: Shirayuki hime Satsujin Jiken) is a 2014 Japanese mystery thriller film directed by Yoshihiro Nakamura.

== Plot ==
Yuji Akahoshi (Gou Ayano) receives a phone call from an old high school friend, Risako Kano (Misako Renbutsu). She tells him that her co-worker at a cosmetics company was stabbed to death and then doused in flames. Yuji Akahoshi decides to interview workers at the company and others that knew the victim, Noriko Miki (Nanao), for his television show.

Yuji Akahoshi soon discovers that another co-worker, Miki Shirono (Mao Inoue) disappeared the same night of the murder. She was last seen running to the train station shortly after Noriko Miki's death. Yuji attempts to unravel the mystery of Miki Shirono.

== Cast ==
- Mao Inoue as Miki Shirono
- Gō Ayano as Yuji Akahoshi
- Nanao as Noriko Miki
- Nobuaki Kaneko as Satoshi Shinoyama
- Erena Ono as Eimi Mitsushima
- Mitsuki Tanimura as Minori Maetani (Miki's friend from university)
- Shihori Kanjiya as Yuko Tanimura (Miki's childhood friend)
- Shunsuke Daito as Shingo Eto (Miki's ex-middle school friend)
- Misako Renbutsu as Risako Kano
- Shōta Sometani as Hasegawa
- Dankan as Kozaburo Shirono (Miki's father)
- Yoko Akino as Satsuki Shirono (Miki's mother)
- Mao Miyaji as Mayama

== Music ==
- "All Alone in the World" performed by Serizawa Brothers (Tsukemen)

== Reception ==
The film earned ¥1 billion (US$8,646,060) in Japan.

Patryk Czekaj, in a review on Twitch Film, called the film "one of the most compelling crime thrillers to come out of Japan in the last few years".

== Awards and nominations ==
Year	Organization	Award	Recipient	Result
2015	38th Japan Academy Prize	Best Actress in a Leading Role	Mao Inoue	Nominated
