= Shinjuku Swan (film) =

- Film poster
- 新宿スワン
- Directed by: Sion Sono
- Written by: Mataichirō Yamamoto; Osamu Suzuki
- Based on: Shinjuku Swan by Ken Wakui
- Produced by: Takeshi Suzuki; Toshiie Tomida; Mataichirō Yamamoto
- Starring: Gō Ayano; Yūsuke Iseya
- Cinematography: Hideo Yamamoto
- Edited by: Shūichi Kakesu
- Music by: Naoki Ohtsubo
- Production companies: Happinet; Japan Music Entertainment; Kōdansha; Tristone Entertainment Inc.
- Distributed by: Sony Pictures Entertainment
- Release date: May 30, 2015
- Running time: 139 minutes
- Country: Japan
- Language: Japanese
- Box office: ¥940 million

Shinjuku Swan (新宿スワン) is a 2015 Japanese comedy film directed by Sion Sono based on the manga of the same name by Ken Wakui. It was released in Japan on May 30, 2015.

== Plot ==
Tatsuhiko, an unemployed young man, gets into a fight with a gang and is rescued by Mako, a scout who recruits girls to work for the Burst scouting agency run by Yamashiro in Kabukichō, a red-light district in Shinjuku, Tokyo. Tatsuhiko learns the trade and becomes a scout as well, with Yosuke as his direct superior. Yamashiro, the boss of the Burst scouting agency, is pressured by a need to pay extravagant protection payments to Chairman Shuzen Amano of the Monbukai family, who demands a bigger cut due to a better offer from the rival Harlem scouting agency.
Matsukata, the boss of the rival Harlem scouting agency, feels that his agency is letting Shinjuku be taken over by Burst. Harlem scout Hideyoshi Minami attempts to take control of the gray zone for his agency alone while he also works behind his boss Matsukata's back to take over the drug trade in Shinjuku, plotting to eventually take over the agency.
Tatsuhiko attempts to scout a girl named Ryoko but discovers that she is a madam when they both react protectively to help a girl arguing with a man in a restaurant. She is impressed and they make love that night. Mako later takes Tatsuhiko to a club called the Moulin Rouge where he introduces Tatsuhiko to his wife Ryoko and they must pretend that they have never met.
A Burst captain named Seki equal in rank to Mako forces Tatsuhiko into a conflict with Harlem where Hideyoshi recognizes Tatsuhiko from his past but Tatsuhiko does not remember him, angering Hideyoshi into breaking the first two fingers on Tatsuhiko's hand. Yamshiro tells Seki to handle the dispute despite Mako's objections. Seki takes Tatsuhiko to get revenge on a group of Harlem scouts but allows himself to be beaten up in order to lay the blame for the attack on Harlem. Yamashiro meets Matsukata to resolve the conflict and offers him 30 million yen to help with his money troubles if Harlem disbands and Matsukata joins Burst as a captain. In order to help Matsukata save face and disguise the buyout Yamashiro offers to sell Tatsuhiko to Harlem in return but Tatsuhiko reacts wildly and destroys much of the equipment in Matsukata's office, at which point Matsukata tells them to keep him and agrees to simply sell Harlem for 30 million yen.
Mako has been recording the conversation with Hayama, Harlem's No. 2, and they force Matsukata to step down for attempting to sell out the agency without consulting Hayama. Hayama has Harlem take responsibility for the conflict with Tatsuhiko and agrees to join Burst for nothing, plotting to take over the combined agency from within together with Hideyoshi. As president of the new combined agency, Yamashiro appoints only Mako, Seki, and Tokimasa of Burst along with Hayama of Harlem as the only captains with everyone else starting from scratch as equals and forced to prove their worth in a competition to see who can scout the most girls in one month and be promoted to captain. Mako warns Tatsuhiko against taking revenge on Hideyoshi.
Hideyoshi rescues the fleeing Ageha, a hostess in great debt who has stolen 50,000 yen from a safe, and buys her from her angry employer, putting her to work around the clock under Mr. Ohbayashi, the abusive operator of a massage parlor. When she is utterly fatigued Hideyoshi offers her drugs so that she can continue to work. Meanwhile Hideyoshi pressures the Burst scouts Ohno, Konno, and Yoda into giving him their 18 newly scouted girls so that he can win the competition.
Tatsuhiko scouts Eiko, a 19-year-old cutter who commits suicide by jumping off the roof of a building. Overcome with guilt, Tatsuhiko stops Ohbayashi from beating Ageha, who views him as the blond Dark Prince from her favorite storybook come to rescue her. He finds her work in a more reputable establishment and takes her on a date around the area as he asks her questions to make sure that she is doing alright emotionally. She abruptly leaves to go to work she drops a bag of drugs that Tatsuhiko finds.
Seki convinces his lover Riko to let herself be scouted by Harlem, where she complains of fatigue and is offered drugs by one of the other girls. She arranges a meet to purchase more drugs at a bowling alley so that Seki can catch the Harlem scouts who are involved, but Hideyoshi foresees the setup and shows up with several men. Seki fights off Busuyama but is forced to surrender when Hideyoshi threatens to cut Riko's throat and is held down in a lane as Hideyoshi throws bowling balls down it, breaking his bones and putting him in the hospital. Hideyoshi and Busuyama later bother some of the girls in Ryoko's establishment and she kicks them out.
Ageha runs away from work and Tatsuhiko finds her back at Ohbayashi's place indulging in drugs with his assistance. Hideyoshi arrives at that moment with a briefcase full of drugs and Tatsuhiko takes it from him but is attacked by Ohbayashi, whom Ageha stabs and kills. Hideyoshi flees and Tatsuhiko begs Ageha to come with him but she would rather be arrested and get clean than continue her current life.
Mako meets Hayama in private and asks him to disclose the source of the drugs in exchange for protection or else he will be taken down like Hideyoshi. He finds out that the drugs are coming from Club Gorgeous and Yamashiro sends out all his men to hunt down Hideyoshi to obtain evidence from him.
Ryoko spots Tatsuhiko retrieving the suitcase from a storage locker and tips him off that Mako had slipped a GPS tracking device into his pocket and that Hideyoshi's real name is Daiki Furuya, a top student at Tatsuhiko's middle school who attempted to stab him in a gang fight. Tatsuhiko's friend Sakakibara jumped in between them and was stabbed instead, becoming paralyzed, after which Daiki Furuya left school and eventually changed his name to Hideyoshi.
Tatsuhiko and Hideyoshi meet on opposite rooftops to exchange the drugs for 20 million yen but after Tatsuhiko throws the briefcase of drugs Hideyoshi does not throw the suitcase of money and instead begins to leave. Tatsuhiko leaps from one rooftop to the other to stop Hideyoshi. Hideyoshi once again tries a sneak attack with a knife but Tatsuhiko knocks it away and finishes him off with bare-knuckle fighting. Hideyoshi cries that he wishes he had been stronger and had friends in school but Tatsuhiko explains that those things didn't help him any, demanding that they become friends from that point forward. Tatsuhiko allows Hideyoshi to escape but gives the drug evidence to Yamashiro, who creates a new position of "lieutenant" (below "captain") for him.
Escaping with the suitcase of money down a back stairway, Hideyoshi is attacked by a gang and shot dead. Tatsuhiko and Mako later visit the place of his death to lay roses. Hayama later asks Mako if he wants to take down Burst but Mako is not interested and accuses Hayama of shooting Hideyoshi, which Hayama denies. Ryoko holds a meeting between Mako and Chairman Amano where Mako says that there will be some upcoming disturbances but that everything will settle in the chairman's favor. The film ends with Tatsuhiko scouting girls at his normal location when he believes he sees Ageha walking down the street past him.

== Cast ==
- Gō Ayano as Tatsuhiko Shiratori
- Takayuki Yamada as Hideyoshi Minami
- Erika Sawajiri as Ageha
- Yūsuke Iseya as Mako
- Jun Murakami as Tokimasa
- Erina Mano
- Ken Yasuda
- Kosuke Toyohara as Jin Yamashiro
- Motoki Fukami as Gensuke Seki
- Yū Yamada as Ryoko
- Mao Asou
- Ayaka Morita
- Nobuaki Kaneko as Yutaka Hayama
- Yūki Kubota as Yosuke
- Lorena Kotō
- Kōtarō Yoshida as Amano

== Box office ==
The film earned ¥252.3 million on its opening weekend at the Japanese box office and a total of ¥940 million.

== Sequel ==
Sion Sono directed a sequel to the film, Shinjuku Swan II, which was released in Japan on January 21, 2017.
