= Rize (band) =

Japanese alternative metal band

- Origin: Shimokitazawa, Tokyo, Japan
- Genres: Nu metal; rapcore; alternative rock; punk rock; hard rock; alternative metal
- Years active: 1997–2019; 2024–present
- Labels: Epic; Tensaibaka; Far Eastern Tribe; Warner
- Members: Jesse; Nobuaki Kaneko; KenKen
- Past members: Tokie u:zo Yoshihiro Nakao
- Website: triberize.net

Rize (Japanese: 雷図, Hepburn: Raizu; stylized as RIZE) is a Japanese rock band formed in 1997, debuting in 2000 and currently signed with Warner Music Japan. The band currently consists of Jesse McFaddin (lead vocals/guitar), Nobuaki Kaneko (drums), and KenKen (bass). Their musical style is a mix of nu metal, alternative rock, punk rock, hard rock and even some reggae flavor. Their song "Zero" from the album Experience has been featured in Coca-Cola commercials in Japan and Asian countries. Their single "Gunshot" has been featured in Resident Evil: Dead Aim. Their song "Muppet" from Experience was featured in the video game Kurohyō: Ryū ga Gotoku Shinshō as the main theme.

== History ==
=== 1997–2000: Formation and debut ===
Rize formed in 1997 with members JESSE, Nobuaki Kaneko and TOKIE. They started performing live concerts in the Shimokitazawa. In 2000, they performed at the 10th Kitazawa Music Festival and, after having been signed to Epic Records Japan, released their debut single "Kaminari". They followed up their debut in November with the hit single "Why I'm Me", with an album being released the same month. However, original member TOKIE left after the album's release, with u:zo joining as the new bassist and Nakao Yoshihiro coming in for guitar.

=== 2001–2006: First nationwide tour and tour outside Japan ===
The following year proved to be a busy one for Rize. In April, JESSE and Nobuaki became radio personalities for the program All Night Nippon until September. They also performed again at the Kitazawa Music Festival in July, as well as the Rock in Japan Festival, Arabaki Rock Fest and Summer Sonic Festival '01 in August. The band's collaboration with Zeebra, "I CAN'T LIVE WITHOUT MY RADIO", became the theme song for FM Festival. They followed it up with a tour in December called 4City (there were four performances).

In May 2002, Rize appeared on the stage @ MTV Japan event with Oasis, Jay-Z, etc., in September Rize participated in the South Korean field festival 2002Etpfes at the Seoul Olympic Stadium. The event was the largest field festival in history, with over 30,000 people in attendance. On February 13 2003, Resident Evil: Dead Aim came out and Rize's single "Gunshot" was featured in the game's credits. In July 2003, they moved to Los Angeles to tour with Kottonmouth Kings and Phunk Junkeez. In 2005, JESSE formed their own label "Tensaibaka Records".

In November 2005, bassist u:zo left, with Nobuaki's brother KenKen replacing him. KenKen was made an official member of the band in April 2006. Their first Oricon appearance happened with a cover of "Pink Spider" in November 2006, debuting at No. 8.

=== 2007–2018 ===
On the top of the successful performance at "Live 8", in 2007 Rize was invited to perform at "Live Earth" appearing on the stage with Linkin Park, etc.

In same year 2007, Rize released their fifth album Alterna. In October 2007, they released their latest single, "LADY LOVE". Rize released KO, their sixth full-length album, in April 2008. The following month saw the band performing at the hide Memorial Summit, at which they performed their rendition of Pink Spider in tribute. On May 20, the band announced through their official site that Yoshihiro Nakao would be parting ways from Rize, citing creative differences as the main factor in his decision. However, the remaining members were determined to carry on activities as a trio. In June Rize went on their 2008 "T.K.O. Tour" that consisted of 29 shows and in November released a live DVD of the tour "T.K.O.".

In 2010, Jesse paved the road for Rize to release their 7th album Experience. A majority of the tracks from this album were masterminded and produced by Jesse, enabling him to get huge attentions as not only an artist and musician, as a music producer. "Zero," the iconic song of this album, was picked up by Coca-Cola and lead to the collaboration commercial with Hidetoshi Nakata / former famous soccer player and Coca-Cola Zero, which is still being aired across a large part of Asia.

Still in 2010, Their song "Muppet" from the album 𝘌𝘹𝘱𝘦𝘳𝘪𝘦𝘯𝘤𝘦 was featured in the videogame Kurohyō: Ryū ga Gotoku Shinshō as the main theme of the game, and even having an instrumental version as the music that plays in the final boss fight.

In July 2011, Rize released their 10th debut anniversary, band history and live DVD titled PIECE.

In 2012, Rize transferred to Warner Music.

=== 2019–present: Hiatus and return ===
On July 20, 2019, it was announced that Jesse and KenKen had both been arrested for violation of the Cannabis Control Law. After a month long investigation based on a tip, police raided their homes; Jesse was found in possession of 2.4 grams of marijuana and .09 grams of cocaine, while KenKen had 0.2 grams of marijuana. Both pled guilty and in October 2019 both received prison sentences suspended for three years; KenKen received 6 months, while Jesse received two years. Rize subsequently went on hiatus.

The band returned on June 5, 2024, when they began their sold-out Solu tour at KT Zepp Yokohama. The following year, Rize held the Nolu tour between June 3, 2025, and July 3. On December 26, 2025, it was announced that Jesse would be suspending all activities starting in January 2026 following a series of physical injuries and a medical evaluation requiring "long-term treatment". Rize resumed activities with a performance at the Onagawa Cotteleezun festival on October 31, 2026.

On November 4, 2026, Jesse was arrested for cocaine use after testing positive for the drug following a search of his house, conducted by Shibuya police as part of an investigation based on a tip.

== Jesse's solo project ==
Jesse started the hip hop unit E.D.O., a diverse group of rappers and artists made up of some of his old high school buddies. E.D.O. has puts out numerous single and their first full album Revolvers was big hit among the Japanese Hip-Hop community. In couple of years, members of E.D.O. have ventured off on their own to start solo projects that have brought much attention to Jesse and his Hip-Hop unit. One project in particular that has received spotlight from underground music critics is Jesse's own E.D.O solo project THE BONEZ. A mixture of Jesse's favorite music genres, rock, hip-hop, and electro, THE BONEZ has put out 6 singles, with each having a different music concept from the previous.

Jesse introduced the Japanese music community to the duo, Def Tech. With many major labels turning away their heads to the young pair, in 2001 Jesse decided to take Micro and Shen under his wing and mold them into the multi-platinum artists that they are today. Not only did Jesse create the road to success for Def Tech but he also played a key role as their producer for their first album and helped Def Tech write the hit song "My Way". In 2005, Jesse has launched his own label Tensaibaka Records, where Def Tech, Rize, and E.D.O. have released a majority of their work.

Jesse is a musician, artist and producer who has also established himself as a prominent figure in Japanese fashion. He created the original clothing line S&Co. and operates the clothing shop Takenaka Sound Shop in his hometown of Togoshi. S&Co. has gained popularity among celebrities, with actor Hayato Ichihara noted as one of its loyal customers and fans.

In May 2010, Jesse launched the Bring the Hope Project, an initiative aimed at spreading a message of hope through music and free live performances. The first Bring the Hope Project Live was held on 4 May 2010, featuring various artists and fans in a charity concert intended to raise hope and awareness.

== Band members ==
Current members

- Jesse McFaddin – vocals, guitar (1997–present)

In addition to being a singer/rapper, guitarist, he has also proven a career as a music producer/composer, plus as a "Fashion Icon" among the youth and appeared on Sony CM + Vans and sponsored their 2009 Live Tour, etc. His father is the Japanese musician Char.

- Nobuaki "NK" Kaneko — drums (1997–present)

He is the only signature drummer in Japan by Pearl.

- Kensuke "KenKen" Kaneko – bass (2006–present)

He is a recognized session bass player in various kind of collaborations with famous artists including performing @ Muzikmesse. He is Nobuaki's younger brother.

Former members

- Tokie – bass (1997–2001)
- u:zo – bass (2001–2005)
- Yoshihiro Nakao – guitar (2001–2008)

Timeline

== Discography ==
=== Studio albums ===
Year	Album details	Oricon chart
2000	Rookey: Released: November 22, 2000	8
2001	Foreplay: Released: December 5, 2001	11
2002	Natural Vibes: Released: November 27, 2002	14
2005	Spit & Yell: Released: July 6, 2005	18
2007	Alterna: Released: February 21, 2007	14
2008	KO: Released: April 16, 2008	16
2010	Experience: Released: June 23, 2010	16
2017	THUNDERBOLT: Released: September 6, 2017	10

=== Singles ===
Year	Title	Oricon chart
1998	"Project from the East Tokyo"	—
2000	"Kaminari"	—
2000	"Why I'm Me"	10
2000	"Music"	—
2001	"Name"	—
2001	"Light Your Fire"	—
2001	"Dream Catcher"	—
2002	"02/One"	—
2003	"Vibration" (introducing Def Tech)	—
2003	"Gun Shot"	—
2006	"Pink Spider"	8
2007	"Kami/Heiwa"	—
2007	"Lady Love"	22
2008	"Live or Die"	32
2009	"Zero"	25
2010	"Laugh It Out"	14
2012	"Local Defense Organization"	37
2017	"Silver"	15

=== Internet/ Digital releases ===
Year	Title
2007	"Heiwa": Released: February 7, 2007
2007	"Kami": Released: February 7, 2007
2014	"Lovehate": Released: October 1, 2014
2015	"Party House": Released: July 24, 2015
2016	"One Shot": Released: October 26, 2016

=== Compilation albums ===
Year	Album details	Oricon chart
2005	Kakumei (YamaArashi vs. Rize): Released: February 23, 2005	—
2005	Fuck'n Best: Released: March 24, 2005	—
2013	Fet Best: Released: June 26, 2013	70

=== DVDs ===
Year	Information	Oricon chart
2001	Fresh Blend: Released: April 25, 2001	—
2002	Fuck'n Live: Released: November 7, 2002	—
2005	Lost Clips: Released: March 24, 2005	70
2007	Alterna Live: Released: October 10, 2007	10
2008	T.K.O.: Released: November 5, 2008	24
2011	Piece: Released: July 20, 2011	30
2018	RIZE Tour 2017 "RIZE IS BACK" Live in Budokan (2017.12.20): Released: March 28, 2018	

== Music videos ==
Year	Song	Director(s)
2000	"Kaminari"	Epic Visual
2000	"Why I'm Me"	Epic Visual
2000	"Music"	James Leung
2001	"Name"	Takimoto Noborukoi
2001	"Light Your Fire"	Usuihiroshi
2001	"Dream Catcher"	Takahashi Eiki
2001	"Nihontou"	Unknown
2002	"One"	Higuchinsky
2002	"02"	Inoue Yasuo
2003	"Vibration" (introducing Def Tech)	Inoue Yasuo
2003	"Gun Shot"	Masaaki Uchino
2003	"G・I・C・O・D・E" (Jesse [from 'RIZE' with 'GICODE'])	Unknown
2005	"ALL STAR"	Unknown
2005	"Youth II Youth"	Nishigōri Isao
2005	"Owtkast"	Shiga Takumi
2005	"Stand Up"	Takashi Inoue & Yukiko Ichimura
2006	"Pink Spider"	Shuichi Tan
2006	"Blacklist" (Jesse [from 'RIZE' with 'E.D.O.'])	Unknown
2007	"Kami"	Electronik
2007	"Heiwa"	Hiroki Tange
2007	"Lady Love"	Sudō Kanji
2007	"You Don't Know" (Jesse [from 'RIZE' with 'E.D.O.'])	Unknown
2007	"Revolvers" (Jesse [from 'RIZE' with 'E.D.O.'])	Unknown
2008	"Live or Die"	Electronik
2008	"カミヒコウキ meets Char" (Jesse [from 'RIZE' with 'E.D.O.'])	Unknown
2009	"Zero"	Josh Taft
2009	"Home Sweet Home" (feat. AI & JAMOSA) (Jesse [from 'RIZE' with 'GICODE'])	Unknown
2009	"Tell Me Why" (Jesse [from 'RIZE' with 'Kaikigesshoku'])	Unknown
2009	"ALLCLEAR" (Jesse [from 'RIZE' with 'Kaikigesshoku'])	Unknown
2009	"Lies & Monkey" (Kaneko [from 'RIZE'])	Unknown
2009	"Orca" (Kaneko [from 'RIZE'])	Unknown
2010	"Laugh It Out" (feat. Yamato)	Ugichin
2010	"Muppet"	Yoshinari Fuse
2012	"Local Defense Organization"	Ugichin
2012	"Access Violation" (Jesse [from 'RIZE'])	Unknown
2012	"Bossman" (feat. DOGMA) (Jesse [from 'RIZE'])	Unknown
2013	"Thread & Needle" (Jesse & Nakao [from 'RIZE' with 'The BONEZ'])	Unknown
2013	"Place of Fire" (Jesse & Nakao [from 'RIZE' with 'The BONEZ'])	Unknown
2013	"Zenith" (Jesse & Nakao [from 'RIZE' with 'The BONEZ'])	Unknown
2014	"Lovehate"	Unknown
2014	"Historia" (Kaneko [from 'RIZE'])	Unknown
2015	"Ray" (Jesse & Nakao [from 'RIZE' with 'The BONEZ'])	Unknown
2015	"Party House"	Unknown
2016	"To a person that may save someone" (Jesse & Nakao [from 'RIZE' with 'The BONEZ'])	Unknown
2016	"Take Me Home" (Kaneko [from 'RIZE'])	Unknown
2016	"Firebird – Special Exhibition with enra -" (Kaneko [from 'RIZE'])	Unknown
2017	"Silver"	Unknown
2017	"One Shot"	Unknown
2017	"Good Day"	Unknown
2017	"TKC"	Unknown
2017	"Thunderbolt Came Back"	Unknown

== Awards and nominations ==
Japan Gold Disc Award

Year	Nominee / work	Award	Result
2001	RIZE	New Artist of the Year	Won

Space Shower Music Awards

Year	Nominee / work	Award	Result
2003	"02"	Best Directive Shooting Video	Won

Space Shower Music Awards

Year	Nominee / work	Award	Result
2018	RIZE	Best Punk/Loud Rock Artist	Nominee
