= Ouroboros (TV series) =

- Genre: Suspense; Thriller; Action
- Based on: Ouroboros Manga written by Kanzaki Yuya
- Directed by: Yasuharu Ishii
- Starring: Toma Ikuta; Shun Oguri; Juri Ueno
- Theme music composer: Kimura Hideakira
- Opening theme: No One by Kimura Hideakira and ENA
- Country of origin: Japan
- Original language: Japanese
- No. of seasons: 1
- No. of episodes: 10

Production
- Running time: 45-47 minutes (pilot was around 90 minutes)

Original release
- Network: TBS Television
- Release: January 16 – March 20, 2015

Ouroboros (ウロボロス〜この愛こそ、正義。) is a Japanese drama series which tells the story about two men, one a detective and another a member of the yakuza, who seek to find the truth about a murder that happened twenty years ago which was clamped down by the police. It is based on the manga of the same name by Kanzaki Yuuya.

The 10-episode long drama was released in 2015 starring Toma Ikuta and Shun Oguri in the leading roles.

The first episode was aired on January 16, 2015, and the series concluded on March 20, 2015.

Apart from Ikuta and Oguri, the series also starred Juri Ueno as Mizuki Hibino, Kotaru Yoshida as Kaoru Mishima, Kenichi Takito as Shinichi Chouno and Yo Yoshida as Tomiko Tachibana.

Aoi Nakamura appeared as a member of the supporting cast in Episode 1 as the petty thief Sawatari.

It was after eight years that Oguri and Ikuta came on board in the same project. The last time they shared screen was in the 2007 live action adaptation of the shoujo manga series Hanazakari no Kimitachi e or Hana-Kimi.

== Plot ==
Ikuo Ryuuzaki (Toma Ikuta) comes across as a bumbling detective with a penchant for smelling around for clues like a "sniffer dog" as put by his partner Mizuki Hibino. Famous for having the highest arrest rate in the second bureau of the Tokyo Police department, he seems to be a promising young detective with a keen sense of justice.

Tatsuya Danno (Shun Oguri) is a promising young member of the Yakuza, rising swiftly up the ranks due to his quick, swift thinking and suave good looks. He has a tendency to joke with a dead-pan expression, catching everyone off-guard at times, well everyone except his loyal right-hand man Fukamachi.

These two men seemingly have nothing in common but are currently moving forward powered by the same desire: to take revenge on the "man with the gold watch" who suppressed the investigation and their statements about witnessing the murder of their teacher, Yuiko-sensei, who was more of an older sister/mother figure to them in the orphanage.

A murder disguised as suicide in the opening episode of the series paves way for the expose of the rampant corruption present in the higher tiers of the police department. Trusting his nose (both literally and figuratively), Ikuo manages to find the culprit along with some covert help from Tacchan or Tatsuya Danno. Also, they uncover the vestiges of truth about the Kintokei-gumi, the "men with the golden watch" who seemingly had more sinister points of interest about the establishment of Mahoroba Orphanage where the protagonists lived until that fateful murder occurred.

As the series progresses, both the characters evolve in their own ways as they grasp every straw to uncover the truth. Ikuo falls for his partner Mizuki even though he realises that her father might be Yuiko-sensei's killer. As Tatsuya put it, "Can you kill him if the truth comes out that way?"

In the finale, Tatsuya deliberately tries to create a rift between Ikuo and himself as he realises that Ikuo had unwittingly created a life revolving around a new and trustworthy set of comrades who unflinchingly trust him. But he was surprised when Ikuo turned up, especially when the murderer was discovered to be someone unexpected and someone whom Tatsuya didn't want Ikuo to kill.

== Cast and characters ==
=== Main ===
- Toma Ikuta as Ikuo Ryuzaki
- Shun Oguri as Tatsuya Danno
- Juri Ueno as Mizuki Hibino
- Yo Yoshida as Tomiko Tachibana
- Tsuyoshi Muro as Takeshi Fukamachi
- Nana Seino as Konatsu Tamura
- Kumiko Takeda as Kirino Abiko
- Ken Mitsuishi as Kunihiko Hibino
- Kenichi Takito as Shinichi Chono
- Kotaro Yoshida as Kaoru Mishima
- Hashinosuke Nakamura as Kiichiro Kitagawa
- Ryōko Hirosue as Yuiko Kashiwaba

=== Guest ===
- Aoi Nakamura as Sawatari (episode 1)
- Gou Ayano as Nachi Sosuke (episodes 7–10)

== Ratings ==
In the tables below, the blue numbers represent the lowest ratings and the red numbers represent the highest ratings.

Episode #	Original broadcast date	Kanton region
1	January 16, 2015	11.5%
2	January 23, 2015	12.6%
3	January 30, 2015	10.4%
4	February 6, 2015	9.8%
5	February 13, 2015	10.1%
6	February 20, 2015	9.2%
7	February 27, 2015	10.6%
8	March 6, 2015	9.6%
9	March 13, 2015	9.4%
10	March 20, 2015	11.3%
Average		10.4%
