= Astro Royale =

Japanese manga series

- First tankōbon volume cover, featuring Hibaru Yotsurugi

願いのアストロ (Negai no Asutoro)
- Genre: Supernatural
- Manga
- Written by: Ken Wakui
- Published by: Shueisha
- English publisher: NA: Viz Media
- Imprint: Jump Comics
- Magazine: Weekly Shōnen Jump
- Original run: April 15, 2024 – April 21, 2025
- Volumes: 6
- icon

Astro Royale (Japanese: 願いのアストロ, Hepburn: Negai no Asutoro) is a Japanese manga series written and illustrated by Ken Wakui. It was serialized in Shueisha's Weekly Shōnen Jump magazine from April 2024 to April 2025, with its chapters collected in six volumes.

== Plot ==
Hibaru Yotsurugi, the only biological son of Kongo Yotsurugi, leader of Asakusa's Yotsurugi-gumi clan, was nominated as the next leader of the former Yakuza group upon Kongo's death. However, after considering the changes in the values of the clan, he declines and appoints his friend, the 12th adopted son, Terasu Yotsurugi, as the next head, to the chagrin of the remaining adopted sons. Shortly thereafter, a meteor shower over Japan awakens a mysterious power called "Astro" in many people, including Hibaru, who develops the ability to have the world's strongest fist, and a war involving the clan begins.

== Publication ==
Written and illustrated by Ken Wakui, the series was serialized in Weekly Shōnen Jump from April 15, 2024, to April 21, 2025. As of July 2025, the series' individual chapters have been collected into six tankōbon volumes.

Viz Media and Manga Plus are publishing the series in English simultaneously with its Japanese release.

=== Volumes ===
No.	Original release date	Original ISBN	English release date	English ISBN
1	July 4, 2024	978-4-08-884122-9	August 5, 2025	978-1-9747-5303-1
1. "Hibaru Yotsurugi" (世剣ヒバル, Yotsurugi Hibaru); 2. "Astro" (アストロ, Asutoro); 3. "Fight Between Brothers" (兄弟ゲンカ, Kyōdai Genka); 4. "The Ikebukuro Two" (池袋のふたり, Ikebukuro no Futari); 5. "A Throwdown by the Book" (掟の決闘, Okite no Kettō); 6. "Older Brother" (兄, Ani); 7. "My True Self" (本当の自分, Hontō no Jibun)
2	October 4, 2024	978-4-08-884210-3	October 7, 2025	978-1-9747-5790-9
8. "Haunted House" (亡霊屋敷, Bōrei Yashiki); 9. "Wax and Roses" (蝋と薔薇, Rō to Bara); 10. "The Iron Chief's Heated Battle" (鉄人達の 熱き戦い, Kutsujintachi no Ratsu ki Tatakai); 11. "Torazo Yotsurugi" (世剣寅三, Yotsurugi Torazō); 12. "Four-Leaf Clover in Bloom" (野の野に咲く四つ葉, Noni Saku Yotsuba); 13. "Collision" (激突, Gekitotsu); 14. "Deciding Battle at Babel" (バベルの決戦, Baberu no Kessen); 15. "How We Met" (出会い, Deai); 16. "Ants" (蟻, Ari); 17. "Regal Aura" (王の格, Ō no Kaku)
3	December 4, 2024	978-4-08-884380-3	December 2, 2025	978-1-9747-5849-4
18. "All-Out War" (総力戦, Sōryokusen); 19. "Outta the Way!" (よけろよ, Yokeroyo); 20. "Game Over" (終局, Shūkyoku); 21. "A New Enemy" (新たな敵, Aratana Teki); 22. "Plant Zero" ("零号"プラント, "Zero Gō" Puranto); 23. "Distant Memories" (遠と記憶, Tōi Kioku); 24. "Kinpa's Wish" (キンパの願い, Kinpa no Negai); 25. "Reri Yotsurugi" (世剣レリ, Yotsurugi Reri); 26. "Combo Attack Battle" (連携戦, Renkeisen)
4	March 4, 2025	978-4-08-884416-9	February 3, 2026	978-1-9747-6154-8
27. "Kuran vs. Harumi" (クランvs vs晴海, Kuran vs Harumi); 28. "Terasu vs. Sou" (テラスvs爽, Terasu vs Sō); 29. "I'll Leave It To You" (任したぜ, Nin shita ze); 30. "Testing a Hypothesis" (假說 美行, Kasetsu jikkō); 31. "Yotsurugi Karma" (世剣の業, Yotsurugi no Gō); 32. "Resolution" (決着, Kecchaku); 33. "Revival" (再興, Saikō); 34. "The Immortal Phoenix" (不死鳥, Tomōtaru); 35. "ABR" (ABR, Ēbīāru)
5	May 2, 2025	978-4-08-884512-8	April 7, 2026	978-1-9747-6197-5
36. "Japanese Yakuza Association" (日本極道連合会, Nihon Gokudōren Gōkai); 37. "Fireball" (ファイアーボール, Faiābōru); 38. "Vs. Hachiku" (VSバチク, Bāsasu Hachiku); 39. "Exposed" (曝け出す, Sarakedasu); 40. "Path of Carnage" (修羅の道, Shura no Michi); 41. "Hibaru vs. Taira" (ヒバルVS対羅, Hibaru Bāsasu Taira); 42. "Since Long Ago" (昔から, Mukashikara); 43. "Come Back" (戻って来い, Modotte Koi)
6	July 4, 2025	978-4-08-884635-4	June 2, 2026	978-1-9747-1643-2
44. "The Scheme" (謀略, Bōryaku); 45. "Love is Conquest" (愛 略奪, Ai Ryakudatsu); 46. "Dealing with the Aftermath" (後始末, Ato Shimatsu); 47. "Match Over" (試合終了, Shiai Shūryō); 48. "That's all" (それだけだ, Soredakeda); 49. "Everyone's Wishes" (みんなの願い, Minna no Negai); 50. "Destruction and Hope—End" (破壊と希望 終, Hakai to Kibō Owari)

== Reception ==
Rodrigo Sandoval Lahut of Screen Rant praised its artwork, writing, and protagonist, describing the latter as "relatable". Manga critic and editor Kazushi Shimada described the story as a "perfect fit" for Weekly Shōnen Jump.

The series was nominated for the tenth Next Manga Award in the print category in 2024.
