= Tōkyō Mukokuseki Shōjo =

- Poster
- 東京無国籍少女
- Directed by: Mamoru Oshii
- Screenplay by: Kei Yamamura
- Story by: Kentarô Yamagishi
- Produced by: Gaku Kawasaki
- Starring: Nana Seino; Hirotarō Honda
- Cinematography: Mitsuo Matoba
- Edited by: Atsuki Sato
- Music by: Shûhei Kamimura
- Distributed by: Toei Company
- Release date: July 25, 2015
- Running time: 85 minutes
- Country: Japan
- Language: Japanese

Tōkyō Mukokuseki Shōjo (東京無国籍少女; lit. "The Stateless Girl of Tokyo") (also known as Nowhere Girl) is a Japanese suspense thriller film directed by Mamoru Oshii. It was released on July 25, 2015, in Japan.

== Plot ==
A strange girl feels that she is out of place in her school. The people around her are also strange. The Russian military attacks the school and she kills them with an AK-74. She wakes up to find that it was a dream, and the school is actually a refugee camp, she is a soldier, and Japan has been invaded by Russia.

== Cast ==
- Nana Seino as Ai
- Nobuaki Kaneko
- Lily
- Hirotarō Honda

== Reception ==
The film was panned by audiences, earning 2.43/5 stars on Yahoo Movies Japan and 2.5/5 stars on Eiga.com, with viewers citing the nonsensical story and bad acting as its biggest problems while praising its visuals. ScreenAnarchy stated: "Once again, Oshii Mamoru has made a film which is mostly for himself, treading ground he has covered before in other (and sometimes better) films. But as his reality-addled puzzles go, this one is actually pretty straightforward, and not too hard to solve. Most fans of his work will probably be pleased."
