= Chihiro Iwasaki =

Japanese artist and illustrator (1918–1974)

Chihiro Iwasaki (いわさき ちひろ (岩崎 知弘), Iwasaki Chihiro; 15 December 1918 – 8 August 1974) was a Japanese artist and illustrator best known for her water-colored illustrations of flowers and children, the theme of which was "peace and happiness for children".

== Life ==
Chihiro Iwasaki was born the first daughter of Masakatsu and Fumie Iwasaki on 15 December 1918, in Takefu (now Echizen), Fukui Prefecture, Japan. The following year, her family moved to Tokyo, where they lived until 1945. As a little girl, Chihiro loved to draw pictures. When she was fourteen years old, she began to learn drawing and oil painting under Saburōsuke Okada, an artist and professor of the Tokyo School of Fine Arts (later Tokyo University of the Arts). In 1936, Iwasaki graduated from high school, and the next year, at the age of eighteen, she began to learn how to draw Japanese calligraphy with inkstick and ink brush.

In 1939, she entered a marriage arranged by her parents, but their relationship was always very distant. She moved with her husband to Dalian, Manchuria, but their marriage soon ended with his suicide, after which Iwasaki returned to Tokyo in 1941. In 1945, the Iwasaki family home in Tokyo was destroyed in an air raid, and Iwasaki and her family moved to the home of her grandmother in Matsumoto, Nagano. In 1946, after World War II was over, she joined the Japanese Communist Party, expressing a desire to end all wars and alleviate child poverty.

After moving back to Tokyo, she became a writer and illustrator for the Jimmin Shinbun. She also drew numerous illustration for commercial posters, magazines and school text books as much as she could. In 1949, an editor of Doshinsha, a children's book publishing company, requested her to create Okaasan no Hanashi (The Story of a Mother), a kind of educational Kamishibai which became her first children's work It was published in 1950, and was awarded the Minister of Education Prize. When this success brought her some money, she made up her mind to be a professional illustrator. In the same year, she remarried to Zenmei Matsumoto, a fellow communist seven years younger than her. She bore their only child in 1951, a son named Takeshi whom she frequently used as a model for her illustrations of babies and children for children's books and magazines. In 1952, she had a home built in Nerima, Tokyo, which became The Chihiro Art Museum Tokyo after she died.

In 1956, Iwasaki authored her first picture book, Hitori de Dekiru yo (I Can Do it All by Myself). That year, she received the Juvenile Culture Award of the Shogakukan Publishing Co. for her illustration works for children's books and magazines. In 1960, her AIUEO no Hon (The Alphabet Book: A-I-U-E-O) won the Sankei Children's Books Award. In 1966, Iwasaki moved to a cottage with studio in the Kurohime Highlands, near Lake Nojiri, Nagano Prefecture. She loved the Kurohime Highlands and spent much time making illustrations for children's books in this cottage every year. In 1971, Kotori no Kuru Hi (The Pretty Bird) won the Graphic Prize Fiera di Bologna. Senka no Naka no Kodomo-tachi (Children in the Flames of War), published in 1973, won the bronze medal of the Leipzig International Book Fair the following year.

In 1974, Iwasaki died of liver cancer at the age of 55. Seven years after her death, in 1981, Totto-Chan: The Little Girl at the Window, written by Tetsuko Kuroyanagi, was published with selected illustrations by Iwasaki. An English edition was published in 1984.

== Style ==
Her main illustrations were watercolors, but some of her works included traditional Japanese and Chinese ink painting techniques. Representing shapes with color blurs without drawing outlines, Applying another color before the first color dries to create a complex bleed, Making the most of the blurred touch of the brush, etc. She used these techniques to create soft, clear, and unique tones. She also created oil paintings. Her style was largely influenced by two of her favorite writers, Kenji Miyazawa and Hans Christian Andersen. She wrote that she felt something in common with Marie Laurencin when she saw one of her pictures, and said she was also impressed by Käthe Kollwitz.

== Memorial museums ==
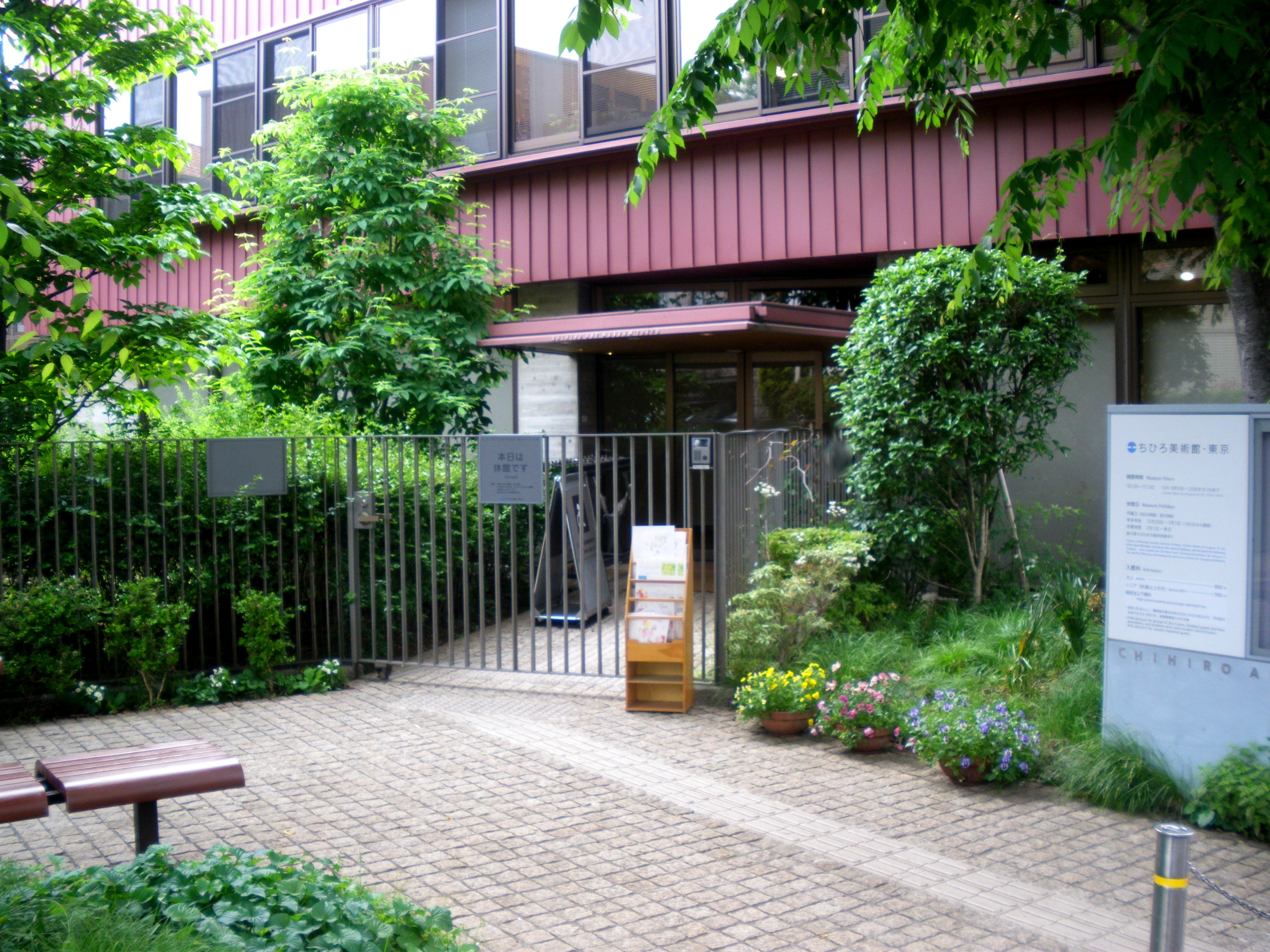
Chihiro Art Museum Tokyo

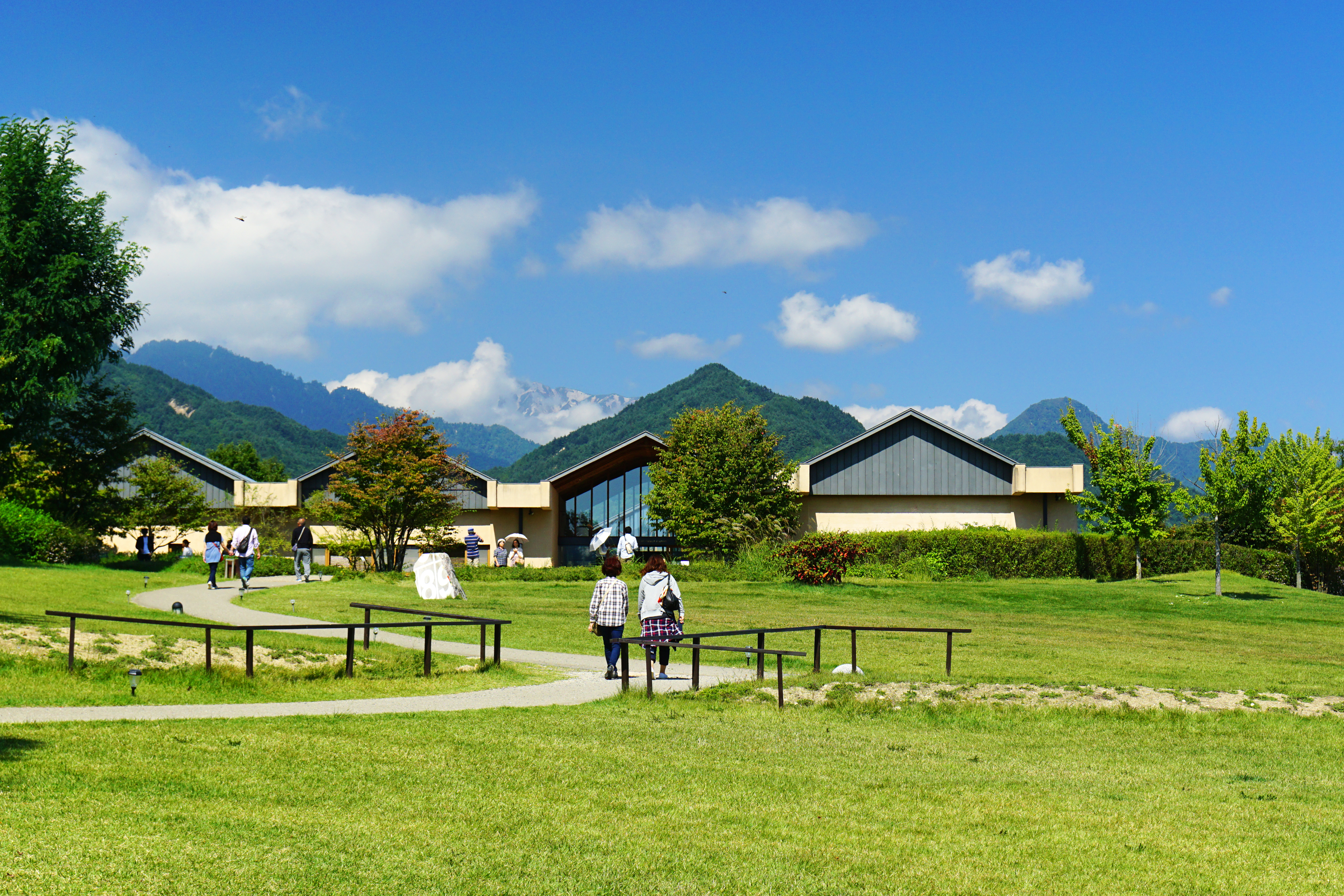
Chihiro Art Museum Azumino

There are two memorial museums dedicated to Chihiro Iwasaki: The Chihiro Art Museum Tokyo (ちひろ美術館・東京, located in Nerima, Tokyo, since 1977) and Chihiro Art Museum Azumino (安曇野ちひろ美術館, located in Azumino, Nagano; since 1997) are both run by the Chihiro Iwasaki Memorial Foundation (いわさきちひろ記念事業団, founded in 1976). Both museums collect and exhibit original illustrations of children's books by Chihiro and other artists.

== Works ==
Chihiro is said to have made nearly seven thousand drawings in her life. This is a partial list of her works.

- Okasan no Hanashi (The Story of a Mother) : a kind of educational Kamishibai, 1949
- Hitori de Dekiru yo (I Can Do It All by Myself) 1956
- AIUEO no Hon (The Alphabet Book: A-I-U-E-O), 1960
- E no Nai Ehon (What the Moon Saw) originally written by H.C. Andersen, 1966
- Tsuru no Ongaeshi (The Crane Maiden) text by Miyoko Matsutani, illustration by Chihiro Iwasaki, 1966 ISBN 978-0-8193-0207-6
- Watashi ga Chiisakatta Toki ni (When I Was a Child), 1967
- Ame no Hi no Orusuban (Staying Home Alone on a Rainy Day), 1968
- The Red Shoes originally written by H.C. Andersen, illustration by Chihiro, in 1968
- Kotori no Kuru Hi (The Pretty Bird), 1973
- Senka no Naka no Kodomo-tachi (Children in the Flames of War), 1973
- Akai Rosoku to Ningyo (The Red Candles and the Mermaid) (published posthumously in 1974) with text by Mimei Ogawa

Books published in English

- Chihiro Iwasaki, Staying Home Alone on a Rainy Day, McGraw-Hill Book Company, 1969.
- Hans Christian Andersen, The Little Mermaid, Picture Book Studio (Natick, MA), 1984.
- Anthea Bell Swan Lake: A Traditional Folktale (adaptation of Tchaikovsky's Lebedinoe ozero), Picture Book Studio (Natick, MA), 1986.
- Anthea Bell The Wise Queen, Picture Book Studio (Natick, MA), 1986.
- Hans Christian Andersen, The Red Shoes, Neugebauer (Boston, MA) Press, 1983 .
- Jacob and Wilhelm Grimm, Snow White and the Seven Dwarves, Picture Book Studio (Natick, MA), 1985.
- Tetsuko Kuroyanagi, Totto-Chan: The Little Girl at the Window, Kodansha USA, 2011.
