= Manriki (film) =

- Theatrical release poster
- Directed by: Yasuhiko Shimizu
- Written by: Yasuhiko Shimizu; Nagano
- Produced by: Takumi Saitoh; Nagano
- Starring: Takumi Saitoh; Nagano; SWAY; Nobuaki Kaneko
- Edited by: Yasuhiko Shimizu
- Music by: Nobuaki Kaneko
- Production company: East Factory
- Distributed by: Toei Video
- Release dates: 29 June 2019 (Bucheon International Fantastic Film Festival); 29 November 2019 (Japan)
- Running time: 88 minutes
- Country: Japan
- Language: Japanese

Manriki (stylized in all capitals), also known as Vise, is a 2019 Japanese satirical black comedy film directed by Yasuhiko Shimizu. Takumi Saitoh, who starred in the film, designed and produced the film with comedian Nagano. (Note: Takumi Saitoh (斎藤 工) directs or produces films under his birthname, Takumi Saitoh (齊藤 工), spelled differently in Kanji but pronounced the same.) The film's plot revolves around a young woman who, being desperate to succeed as a fashion model, undergoes a grotesque and painful facial reduction procedure using a vise. Her face is disfigured as a result, which leads to absurd and darkly comic consequences.

Saitoh and director Shimizu based the film on a script that had been inspired by the discomfort Nagano felt at a fashion-industry event. It is the first feature film by Team MANRIKI, a filmmaking project team consisting of Saito, Nagano, Shimizu, and musician and actor Nobuaki Kaneko.

The film won the Asian Award at the 23rd Bucheon International Fantastic Film Festival in 2019.
