= Here Comes the Bride, My Mom! =

- Film poster
- Directed by: Mipo Oh
- Written by: Tsukine Sakuno (novel), Mipo Oh
- Starring: Aoi Miyazaki; Shinobu Otake
- Cinematography: Shohei Tanikawa
- Distributed by: Toei
- Release date: 4 September 2010
- Running time: 110 minutes
- Country: Japan
- Language: Japanese
- Box office: $1,455,939

Here Comes the Bride, My Mom! (オカンの嫁入り, Okan no Yomeiri) is a 2010 Japanese film by Mipo Oh. It was released in Japanese cinemas on 4 September 2010.

== Plot ==
A single mother comes home to her single child and is accompanied by an unannounced, much younger man. Her daughter Tsukiko thinks in the first place her mother intends to pair her off with this stranger, but her mother wants the unemployed chef for herself. Tsukiko, who is unemployed herself, has it hard to somehow cope with this development.

== Cast ==
- Aoi Miyazaki as Tsukiko Morii
- Shinobu Otake as Yoko Morii
- Kenta Kiritani as Kenji Hattori
- Moeko Ezawa as Saku Ueno
- Jun Kunimura as Akira Murakami
- Yasufumi Hayashi as Shinya Motohashi
- Yôsuke Saitô as Yoshio Sasaki
- Yasuko Haru as Sachi Shimamura
- Seiko Takuma as Makoto Wada
- Tomochika as Seiko Kotani
- Toshiki Ayata as Ryoji Inosena
