= Cecil Bouchier =

Royal Air Force Air Vice-Marshal (1895–1979)

Sir Cecil Bouchier
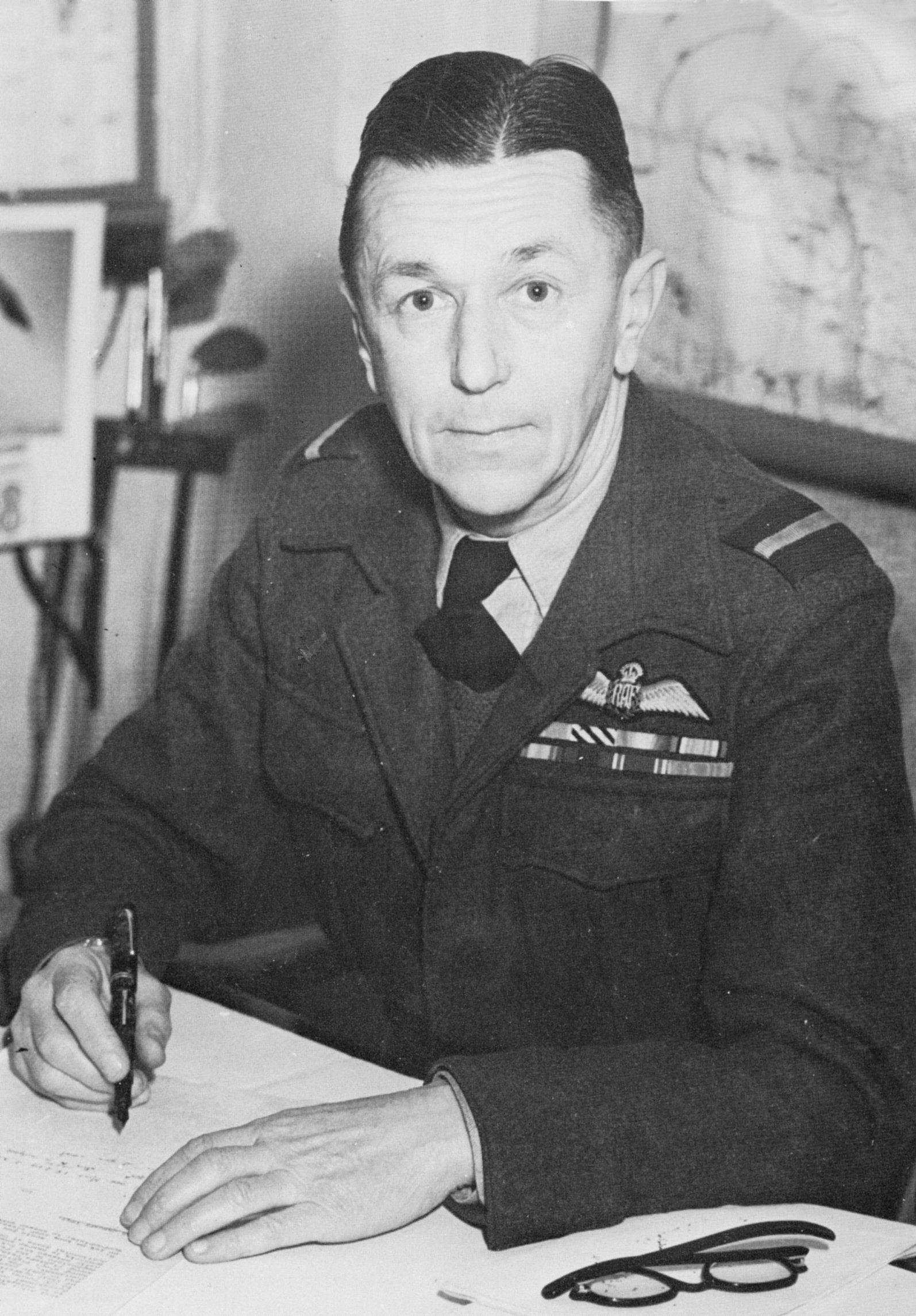
- Cecil Bouchier as an air commodore
- Born: 14 October 1895; Fleet, Hampshire
- Died: 15 June 1979 (aged 83); Worthing Hospital, Worthing, West Sussex
- Spouse: Dorothy Britton
- Military career
- Allegiance: United Kingdom
- Branch: British Army; Royal Air Force
- Service years: 1915–1953
- Rank: Air Vice Marshal
- Nickname: "Boy"
- Commands: No. 21 Group (1948–49); British Commonwealth Air Forces of Occupation (1945–48); No. 221 Group (1945); RAF Kenley (1941–42); RAF Hornchurch (1938–40); No. 54 Squadron (1936–38); No. 1 Squadron IAF (1933–36)
- Conflicts: First World War; Second World War
- Awards: Knight Commander of the Order of the British Empire; Companion of the Order of the Bath; Distinguished Flying Cross; Mentioned in Despatches (2); Order of St. Anna, 2nd Class with Swords and Bow (Russia); Commander of the Legion of Merit (United States)

Air Vice Marshal Sir Cecil Arthur Bouchier, KBE, CB, DFC (14 October 1895 – 15 June 1979) was a senior Royal Air Force officer. He was Air Officer Commanding No. 221 Group RAF in 1945 and Air Officer Commanding British Commonwealth Air Forces as part of the Occupation Force in Japan from 1945 to 1948.

Bouchier was married to Dorothy Britton, who translated a number of Japanese books into English.

== Awards and decorations ==
- Distinguished Flying Cross awarded to Flying Officer Cecil Arthur Bouchier on 18 November 1919.

Flying Officer Cyril Arthur Bouchier – A very skilful pilot of marked, initiative and courage. Has been brought to notice on many occasions for the determination shown in his attacks. His methods are somewhat original. By flying low, parallel with and behind the enemy's lines, stampeding convoys and destroying wagons, he has caused the greatest confusion amongst the enemy, to the great advantage of our own forces. Flying Officer Bouchier is a highly competent reconnaissance officer

The citation had the wrong first name and was corrected to Cecil in a later gazette.

- Squadron Leader Cecil Arthur Bouchier, DFC appointed an Officer of the Order of the British Empire on 23 June 1936
- Air Commodore Cecil Arthur Bouchier CBE, DFC appointed a Companion of the Order of the Bath on 14 June 1945
- 9 March 1948 Air Vice Marshal Cecil Arthur Bouchier, CB, CBE, DFC is allowed to war decoration of Commander of the Legion of Merit conferred by the President of the United States in recognition of valuable services rendered in connection with the war.
- Air Vice Marshal Cecil Arthur Bouchier, CB, CBE, DFC appointed a Knight Commander of the Order of the British Empire on 1 January 1953

== Promotions ==
- Trumpeter, Honourable Artillery Company
- Flying Officer – 2 February 1918 (Royal Flying Corps)
- Flying Officer – 1 August 1919 (permanent commission Royal Air Force)
- Flight Lieutenant – 1 January 1926
- Squadron Leader – 1 August 1935
- Wing Commander – 1 July 1938
- Group Captain – 1 December 1940
- Air Commodore – 1 October 1946
- Air Vice Marshal – 25 June 1949

Military offices
Preceded by Francis Mellersh	Air Officer Commanding No. 21 Group; 1948–1949	Succeeded by George Banting
