= Nobuaki Kaneko =

Japanese drummer and actor (born 1981)

- 金子 ノブアキ
- Born: 5 June 1981 (age 45); Shimokitazawa, Setagaya, Tokyo, Japan
- Education: Horikoshi High School
- Occupations: Actor, drummer
- Years active: 1994–present
- Agent: Itoh Company
- Notable work: Sweet Sweet Ghost; Crows Zero
- Television: Buzzer Beat; Gunshi Kanbei; Alice in Borderland; Smoking
- Musical career
- Genres: Rock; punk rock; hardcore punk; hybrid rock; alternative rock; nu metal
- Occupation: Drummer
- Instrument: Drum kit
- Years active: 1993–present
- Label: Illchill
- Website: Official website

Nobuaki Kaneko (金子 ノブアキ, 金子 信昭, Kaneko Nobuaki; born 5 June 1981) is a Japanese drummer and actor. He is nicknamed Akkun (あっくん) and N.K. He is a member of the rock band Rize. He is represented with Itoh Company and his label is Illchill. He graduated from Horikoshi High School.

Kaneko's father was Johnny Yoshinaga who was also a drummer, and his mother is singer Mari Kaneko. His younger brother is Kensuke Kaneko (known as KenKen) who is the bassist of Rize, and the brothers formed a rhythm section.

In November 2013, Kaneko married a non-celebrity woman who is a former model.

== Discography ==
=== Bands ===
- Gonna Be Fun: a band formed in Ponkickies with Rie Tomosaka (vocals) and Takumi Samejima (guitar). On 1 November 1997, the band released a single CD "Birthday Party" with Toshiba EMI.
- Rize: three-piece band with Jesse (vocals) and his brother KenKen (bass).
- Dadas: Indie band with Daisuke Ide (vocal and guitar), Hidenaki Tanaka (bass), Kenji Akimine (guitar) and Kaneko (drums). They belong to Disillusion Recordings.
- Torcerse: a unit formed by Kaneko and KenKen in December 2006. Their main activities are live sessions etc.
- AA=: solo project by Takeshi Ueda (The Mad Capsule Markets). He participate in live tours with drum support.
- Lands
- Red Orca

=== Solo activities ===
He started doing solo activities in 2009.

==== Albums ====
	Year	Title
1st	2009	Orca
2nd	2014	Historia
3rd	2016	Fauve

==== Limited singles ====
Year	Title	Ref.
2015	"Lobo"	

=== Music videos ===
Director	Song title
Shiro Ushijima	"Uso to Saru"
Yasuhiko Shimizu	"Historia"
Unknown	"Orca"

=== Tours ===
Year	Title	Ref.
2016	Nobuaki Kaneko Tour 2016 "Fauve"	

=== Related artists ===
- Rize
- Johnny Yoshinaga
- Mari Kaneko
- Char
- Dadas
- Def Tech – album recording, 2006 tour support
- Kazuya Yoshii – 2005 tour support
- Daisuke Ide
- Micro – 2008 tour support, composing participation
- AA= – 2009 tour support
- kayoko – 2004 cording
- Chara – 2008 album recording
- Buono! – 2009 recording
- Aggressive Dogs – 2009 "loud" recording
- The SanPaulo – 2009 live guest
- Trio Ohashi – 2013 album plugged recording

=== Equipment used ===
- Drum kits
  - Orange County Drum and Percussion (2000 to 2003)
  - Pearl

== Filmography ==
=== TV dramas ===
Year	Title	Role	Notes	Ref.
1994	Tengoku ni Ichiban Chikai Mama			
1997	Ichiban Taisetsu na Hito	Kazuhiko Yuuki		
2011	QP	Tom		
2012	Perfect Son	Fuyuhiko Ikeda		
2014	Kū Neru Futari Sumu Futari	Shuichi Nonoyama (Nonchan)	Lead role	
2015	Gakkō no Kaidan	Fumi Umeni		
2016	Haburashi/Onna Tomodachi	Nadashi Natashina		
2017	Rakuen	Akio Sanwa		
2020-22	Alice in Borderland	Danma "Hatter" Takeru		
2020–21	Awaiting Kirin	Sakuma Nobumori	Taiga drama	
2021	Promise Cinderella	Kōya Kurose		
2024	Oshi no Ko	Taishi Gotanda		
2026	Song of the Samurai	Sasaki Tadasaburo		

=== Films ===
Year	Title	Role	Notes	Ref
2000	Sweet Sweet Ghost	Takuro Sakasaki		
2001	Cross	Kohei Kazama		
2009	Crows Zero II	Narumi Taiga		
2010	Bandage	Ruge		
2010	Shodo Girls	Hiroo Ikezawa		
2010	Ōoku	Saburōza		
2011	Manzai Gang			
2011	Moteki	Daisuke Yamashita		
2011	Shuffle	Kōhei Tobe (Raymond)	Lead role	
2011	Hard Romantic-er	Takashi		
2013	Strawberry Night	Suzuki Kobayashi		
2014	Tokyo Nanmin	Atsushi Kodama		
2014	The Snow White Murder Case	Satoshi Shinzan		
2015	Shinjuku Swan	Yutaka Hayama		
2015	Tokyo Mu Kokuseki Shōjo	Homeroom teacher		
2017	Shinjuku Swan II	Yutaka Hayama		
2018	Gangoose	Katō		
2019	Diner			
2019	Manriki			
2021	A Day with No Name			
2023	Scroll			
2023	Matched	Kageyama		
2024	Acma:Game: The Final Key	Kōki Kuroda		
2024	Oshi no Ko: The Final Act	Taishi Gotanda		
2025	Blazing Fists	Yujiro Osako		

=== DVD ===
Year	Title	Ref.
2016	Nagano "Ω"	

=== Advertisements ===
Year	Title	Ref.
1993	WOWOW Godzilla	
1996	Otsuka Pharmaceutical "Hot Pot"	
1997	Matsushita Denki Sangyō "Soi"	
1998	Eisai "Chocola BB"	
1999	Nintendo Mario Golf "Chichi no yorokobi", "Musuko no yorokobi"	
1999	Suntory Natchan Orange "Hatsukoi"	
2000	Sony MiniDisc	
2006	Pearl Drums	
2013	Kirin Brewery Company "Smirnoff Ice"	
2014	Wright Flyer Studios "Shōmetsu Toshi"	
2015	Apparel brand "glamb"	

=== Video games ===
Year	Title	Role	Ref.
2021	No More Heroes III	Composer	
2026	Romeo is a Dead Man	Composer with Luby Sparks and Cody Carpenter	
