= Mipo O =

Zainichi Korean filmmaker (born 1977)

- Born: Mipo O March 3, 1977 (age 49); Iga, Mie, Japan
- Other name: Mipo Oh
- Education: Osaka University of Arts Visual Concept Planning Department
- Occupations: film director, screenwriter, and commercial director
- Years active: 1995-present

Mipo O (吳美保, O Mipo; Korean: 오미보, born March 3, 1977, in Iga, Mie, Japan) is a Japanese-born Korean film director, screenwriter, and commercial director. Her name is also romanized Mipo Oh.

== Career ==
After graduating from the Osaka University of Arts Visual Concept Planning Department, O began working as a screenwriter under director Nobuhiko Obayashi. She soon expanded to directing, and her third short film Eye won a prize at the Short Shorts Film Festival in 2002, while her short film Grandmother won the grand prize in the Digital Shorts category of Tokyo International Fantastic Film Festival. In 2005, she wrote her first feature-length screenplay, The Sakai’s Happiness, which won the Sundance/NHK International Filmmakers Award, and the following year, she directed her first feature-length film based on this screenplay. In 2010, she wrote and directed Here Comes the Bride, My Mom!, which played at the Busan International Film Festival and took the grand prize for the Kaneto Shindo Awards, awarded to promising directors by a committee of Japanese producers. She won the best director award at the Montreal World Film Festival for The Light Shines Only There, which was also nominated to be Japan's entry for the Academy Award for Best Foreign Film. Her next film, You Are a Good Kid, for which she teamed up again with the producer and screenwriter of The Light Shines Only There, will be released in 2015. In addition to films, she also writes and directs commercials and episodes for television.

In November 2026, she will be honored with Kurosawa Akira Award at the 39th Tokyo International Film Festival.

== Family ==
She is a third generation Korean-Japanese.

== Filmography ==
- Here Comes the Bride, My Mom! (2010)
- The Light Shines Only There (2014)
- Being Good (2015)
- Living in Two Worlds (2024)
- How Dare You? (2025)
