= Karen Takizawa =

Japanese model, tarento, and actress (born 1992)

- 滝沢 カレン
- Born: Marina Takizawa; May 13, 1992 (age 34); Tokyo, Japan
- Occupations: Model; tarento; actress
- Years active: 2008–present
- Agent: Stardust Promotion
- Height: 1.70 m (5 ft 7 in)
- Spouse: Undisclosed (m. 2022)
- Children: 1

Karen Takizawa (滝沢 カレン, Takizawa Karen; born May 13, 1992 in Tokyo) is a Japanese model, tarento and actress. She is represented by the agency Stardust Promotion and was the winner of the Miss Seventeen 2008 grand prix. She was an exclusive model for the fashion magazine JJ.

== Early life ==
Karen Takizawa was born as Marina Takizawa in Tokyo on May 13, 1992. Born to a Ukrainian father and Japanese mother who was a ballerina, her parents divorced before she was born, and she has never met her father. She was raised in a single-parent household and was mainly cared for by her strict maternal grandparents because of her busy mother.

When Takizawa entered elementary school, she experienced xenophobia and was bullied/harassed by other kids because of her foreign background and was often told to "go back to your country!" She was also called names like "Darth Vader" among others due to her tall stature. When she consulted with her grandmother, she was advised to "just fight back because you're big" and "use your inferiority complex as a weapon." She followed her advice and started fighting back against her bullies, and gradually the bullying ceased.

As a teen, she was an avid fan of actress Yuko Takeuchi and wanted to follow in her footsteps to enter the entertainment industry. When she told her family about her aspiration, she was met with strong opposition from her grandmother saying: "If you go into showbiz, I'll cut all ties with you!.". Still, Takizawa was reluctant to give up on her dream; she continued to secretly send resumes to modeling agencies and went out into the city, hoping to be approached by modeling scouts. She was eventually scouted and joined an agency. After her modeling debut, she gradually became estranged from her grandmother and had not spoken to her until her death.

== Career ==
Takizawa was scouted in Shibuya and entered the entertainment industry as a model. She entered and won the Miss Seventeen 2008 grand prix for the fashion magazine Seventeen in 2008 and began activities as an exclusive model. From 2009 to 2010, Takizawa starred in the live action films of Rookies: Graduation and Maria-sama ga Miteru. She currently models for fashion magazines Oggi.

In March 2011, she graduated from high school and from the fashion magazine Seventeen. A month later, she joined JJ as their exclusive model. In 2014, she moved agencies from Groovy Air to Stardust Promotion. Takizawa gained traction as a tarento for her appearance on Dancing Sanma Palace in June 2015, where her unique method of speech and choice of words was noticed. Since then, she has become an active television personality on various programs.

On July 23, 2019, Takizawa graduated from JJ as an exclusive model.

== Personal life ==
On July 4, 2022, Takizawa announced on her Instagram that she has married a non-celebrity man who works in the architecture industry. Takizawa announced through her agency in February 6, 2025, that she is expecting her first child. She gave birth to her first child on August 4.
