= Shinjuku Swan =

Japanese manga series

- Cover of the first volume of the manga

新宿スワン
- Manga
- Written by: Ken Wakui
- Published by: Kodansha
- Imprint: Young Magazine KC
- Magazine: Weekly Young Magazine
- Original run: 2005 – 2013
- Volumes: 38
- Television drama
- Original network: TV Asahi
- Original run: August 18, 2007 – September 29, 2007
- Episodes: 6
- Live-action
- Shinjuku Swan (2015); Shinjuku Swan II (2017)

Shinjuku Swan (新宿スワン) is a Japanese manga series written and illustrated by Ken Wakui. It was serialized in Kodansha's Weekly Young Magazine from 2005 to 2013, with its chapters collected in thirty-eight tankōbon volumes. It was adapted into a Japanese television drama series that aired in 2007 and was also adapted into two live-action films directed by Sion Sono.

== Plot ==
Shiratori Tatsuhiko works as a scout for Burst, a talent agency in Kabukicho, Shinjuku's red light district. In a business where money means everything Tatsuhiko finds himself in a constant struggle between rival talent scouts and the yakuza.

== Characters ==
- Tatsuhiko Shitori
- Chisato Morinaga
- Mako
- Hideyoshi
- Yousuke
- Seki
- Hayama
- Tokimasa
- Tadatoshi Ushio
- Soga
- Kameyama
- Momozuka Yuu
- Saotome Akemi
- Masaki Taki
- Tanashi Take

== TV series ==
=== Cast ===
- Yōsuke Kawamura as Tatsuhiko
- Haruna Yabuki as Yūka Hasegawa
- Tomohisa Yuge as Hideyoshi Minami
- Eiki Kitamura as Mako

== Film adaptations ==
=== Shinjuku Swan ===
The manga was adapted into a comedy film directed by Sion Sono that was released in Japan on May 30, 2015.

=== Shinjuku Swan II ===
Shinjuku Swan II, also directed by Sion Sono, was released in Japan on January 21, 2017.
