= Sosaku Kobayashi =

Japanese educator (1893-1963)

- 小林宗作
- Born: June 15, 1893; Iwashima, Gunma Prefecture, Japan
- Died: February 8, 1963 (aged 69)
- Education: Tokyo University of the Arts
- Occupations: Dalcroze eurhythmics and early childhood education researcher

Sosaku Kobayashi (小林 宗作; 15 June, 1893 – 8 February, 1963) was a Japanese eurhythmics and early childhood education researcher and schoolteacher. He was responsible for popularizing eurhythmics in Japanese early childhood education, and he is also known as the headmaster of the innovative elementary school Tomoe Gakuen.

== Early life and education ==
Kobayashi was born in 1893 to a farming family in the village of Iwashima (now Higashiagatsuma) in Agatsuma District, Gunma Prefecture. He was his parents' third son and the youngest child of five. While he was adopted by the family which his elder sister married into, and his legal family name was changed to Kaneko (金子), he generally went by the name Kobayashi. He was interested in music from an early age.

In 1899, he enrolled in Mishima Elementary School, and in 1907, after graduating from its advanced course, he was employed as a substitute teacher and obtained a formal teaching license. Aspiring to become a music teacher, he went to Tokyo in 1911, where he worked at Shinjuku Ushigome Elementary School. In 1916, after several years of studying, he was admitted to the second-class instructor course (a one-year course for those who had graduated from an advanced elementary school) at the Tokyo Academy of Music, now the music department at the Tokyo University of the Arts.

Once he graduated the next year, he enrolled in a special course at the same university, focusing on shōka. During this time, he worked for various public elementary schools and the private Seikei Elementary, which influenced him through its educational philosophy of building character in the students and encouraging their individuality. Possibly due to finding it difficult to balance his employment and studies, or perhaps due to his growing interest in foreign music education taking up his time and attention, he left the special course after being enrolled for the allowed maximum of five years.

Kobayashi's second-eldest brother graduated from the Gunma Normal School and worked as an instructor or headmaster at various elementary schools in Gunma and Tokyo, putting him in the same field as Kobayashi, and their paths crossed frequently. However, perhaps due to having differing views on education, they were apparently frequently in conflict with each other.

== Eurhythmics studies ==
Kobayashi went abroad to study in 1923, visiting Switzerland, France, Germany, Italy, and the United Kingdom. He was funded by a director at Seikei who was impressed by Kobayashi's guidance of the students in performing musical theater and operettas at a time when this was unusual in Japanese schools, which focused musical education on shōka. While abroad, Kobayashi found interest in Rudolf Bode's system of "expressive gymnastics", and at the Institut Jaques-Dalcroze, he learned about Dalcroze eurhythmics directly from Émile Jaques-Dalcroze.

On returning to Japan, he took teaching positions at places such as the Baku Ishii Dance Research Institute and Toyo Eiwa Jogakuin. Additionally, in 1925, he took part in establishing Seijyo Kindergarten along with the educational reformer Kuniyoshi Obara and taught eurhythmics both there and at the associated elementary school. In 1930, he once again visited Europe, studying in Paris, Milan, and Berlin.

As part of the Taishō Liberal Education Movement, Kobayashi aimed to provide children in preschool and elementary school with a more free and artistic music education. While working as a teacher, he began to publish on musicality in young children, Western musical education, and eurhythmic education. He researched early musical childhood education, the connection between musical, spatial, and what he called "color" rhythm, and the integration of music and physical exercise.

== Tomoe Gakuen ==
In 1937, he resigned from Seijyo Kindergarten to take over Jiyūgaoka Elementary School, founded by Kishie Tezuka, at the recommendation of Baku Ishii. He renamed the school Tomoe Gakuen. He also gave his eldest son the name Tomoe; both were named after the Tomoe symbol. At the school, which took a student-centered approach, children chose which order to study their daily subjects, went on educational walks in nature and to local sites, grew food for school events, and learned in train cars rather than typical classrooms. They also studied English even after the start of World War II, when it was considered the enemy's language.

Kobayashi provided food for students when needed. Rather than assigning uniforms, he encouraged parents to send students in worn-out clothing, so that they could play without hesitation about dirtying their clothes and so they could express themselves through what they wore. He also modeled inclusion, listening, and discussion to his students, and those with unusual circumstances or disabilities were welcomed and included by their peers.

The class sizes at Tomoe were small, and Kobayashi did not allow any advertising about the school's alternative nature, which probably helped to prevent attention from authorities who, during the war, attempted to remove Western influences from the educational system.

During the war, the children were eventually evacuated to Kobayashi's hometown of Iwashima. The school burned down during an air raid in 1945. While watching the school burn, Kobayashi supposedly murmured to his son Tomoe, "What kind of school should we make next time?" The elementary school was officially closed the next year, and while its kindergarten continued to operate, Kobayashi did not interact closely with the students as he had at the elementary school.

== Post-war ==
After the war, Kobayashi founded another kindergarten, Sakura Kindergarten, in 1948, and he acted as its first principal. The next year, he took a position as a eurhythmics instructor at Kunitachi College of Music's newly established associated middle and high school, and in 1950, he was hired as a lecturer at the College and made director of the associated kindergarten.

Kobayashi died of an intracranial hemorrhage on 8 February, 1963. The Tomoe Gakuen kindergarten closed after Kobayashi's death.

== Legacy ==
Kobayashi's students included:

- Pianist Sonoko Inoue
- Actress Tetsuko Kuroyanagi
- Physicist Taiji Yamanouchi
- Actress Junko Ikeuchi
- Actress Keiko Tsushima
- Actor Akihiro Miwa

Kuroyanagi wrote about her experience at Tomoe Gakuen in her book Totto-Chan: The Little Girl at the Window. It is through this work that Kobayashi is primarily known to the general public. Her memoir was the best-selling book in Japanese history and encouraged Japanese parents to advocate for educational reform. The Chinese translation inspired the establishment of a school for autistic children in Shanghai influenced by Kobayashi's educational philosophy as depicted in the book.

The Sakura Kindergarten founded by Kobayashi continues to operate and still uses eurythmics as part of the curriculum.

== Bibliography ==
- 佐野, 和彦 (8 August 1985), "小林宗作抄伝", A Brief Biography of Kobayashi Sosaku, 話の特集, doi:10.11501/12226883(registration required)

== See also ==
- Totto-Chan: The Little Girl at the Window
- Student-centered learning
