= Ouroboros (manga) =

Japanese manga series

Ouroboros (ウロボロス -警察ヲ裁クハ我ニアリ-, Ouroboros - Keisatsu o Sabaku wa Ware ni Ari) is a Japanese seinen manga series written and illustrated by Kanzaki Yuuya. It was adapted into a TV series of the same name released in January 2015.

== Plot ==
Ikuo Ryuuzaki and Danno Tatsuya are 2 orphaned boys who were looked after by a person they called 'sensei'. Following their sensei's brutal murder, the two vow to hunt down the killers and the police officers who neglected to properly investigate the case.

15 years later, Ryuuzaki is a police detective and Tatsuya has become the leader of a group of mobsters. Helping each other out behind the scenes, they strive to rise to the tops of their respective fields so that they may exact their vengeance.
