= Ken Wakui =

Japanese manga artist

Ken Wakui 和久井健
- Area: Manga artist
- Notable works: Shinjuku Swan; Tokyo Revengers
- Awards: 2020 Kodansha Manga Award in the shōnen category

Ken Wakui (Japanese: 和久井健, Hepburn: Wakui Ken) is a Japanese manga artist best known for his works Shinjuku Swan and Tokyo Revengers.

Wakui debuted with Shinjuku Swan in 2005 which became a notable commercial success and received multiple adaptations; the series concluded in 2013. His three shorter series, Abaddon, Budgerigar and Desert Eagle were released from 2010 to 2016. Wakui's most critically acclaimed work, Tokyo Revengers, was first published in 2017 and concluded in 2022; with more than 70 million copies in circulation, Tokyo Revengers has since become one of the best-selling manga series of all time and it has been adapted into an anime series and several live-action films.

== Biography ==
After being fired from his first job, during his happy high-school years, Wakui often spent time with street gangs. However, he later found work as a bar host and eventually graduated from high school. In 2004, Wakui entered Shinjuku Swan into the Weekly Young Magazine Newcomer Award, where it earned an honorable mention. The next year, it began serialization in Weekly Young Magazine, where it ran until 2013. The series performed well and earned a jury recommendation at the 12th Japan Media Arts Festival. It was also adapted into two live-action films, which were released in May 2015 and January 2017.

In March 2017, Wakui launched Tokyo Revengers in Weekly Shōnen Magazine. The series quickly became popular and won the Kodansha Manga Award in the shōnen category in 2020. It has also received multiple adaptations, notably an anime television series and a live-action film.

== Works ==
- Shinjuku Swan (新宿スワン) (2005–2013; serialized in Weekly Young Magazine)
- Abaddon (2010–2012; serialized in Weekly Young Magazine)
- Budgerigar (セキセイインコ) (2014–2015; serialized in Weekly Young Magazine)
- Desert Eagle (デザートイーグル) (2015–2016; serialized in Weekly Shōnen Magazine)
- Tokyo Revengers (東京卍リベンジャーズ, Tōkyō Ribenjāzu) (2017–2022; serialized in Weekly Shōnen Magazine)
- Astro Royale (願いのアストロ, Negai no Asutoro) (2024–2025; serialized in Weekly Shōnen Jump)
