= Totto-Chan: The Little Girl at the Window =

Japanese book

- First Asian edition cover (English)
- Author: Tetsuko Kuroyanagi
- Original title: Madogiwa no Totto-chan
- Translator: Dorothy Britton
- Illustrator: Chihiro Iwasaki
- Cover artist: Chihiro Iwasaki
- Language: Japanese
- Series: storybook
- Genre: Children's literature, Autobiographical novel
- Publisher: Kodansha Publishers Ltd.
- Publication date: 1981
- Publication place: Japan
- English publication date: 1982
- Media type: Print (Paperback)
- Pages: 232
- ISBN: 978-4-7700-2067-3

Totto-chan, the Little Girl at the Window (Japanese: 窓ぎわのトットちゃん, Hepburn: Madogiwa no Totto-chan) is an autobiographical memoir written by Japanese television personality and UNICEF Goodwill Ambassador Tetsuko Kuroyanagi. The book was published in 1981, and became an "instant bestseller" in Japan. The book is about the values of the unconventional education that Kuroyanagi received during World War II at Tomoe Gakuen, a Tokyo elementary school founded by educator Sosaku Kobayashi.

The Japanese name of the book is an expression used to describe people whom society considers to be failures.

== Background ==
After hearing about how children were refusing to attend school, Tetsuko decided to write about her experience attending Tomoe Gakuen. Totto-chan was originally published in Japan as a series of articles in Kodansha's Young Woman magazine appearing from February 1979 through December 1980. The articles were then collected into a book, which made Japanese publishing history by selling more than 5 million before the end of 1982, which made the book break all previous publishing records and become the bestselling book in Japanese history.

An English edition, translated by Dorothy Britton, was published in America in 1984. The book has been translated into a number of languages, including, Arabic, Burmese, Chinese, Dutch, French, Italian, German, Korean, Malay, Nepali, Tagalog, Vietnamese, Indonesian, Thai, Russian, Uyghur, Sinhala, and Lao, and 11 Indian languages including Hindi, Marathi, Gujarati, Telugu, Assamese, Kannada, Tamil, Malayalam, Bengali, and Oriya.

A bilingual collection of stories from the book, entitled Best of Totto-chan: Totto Chan: The Little Girl at the Window, was published in 1996.

== Plot synopsis ==
The book begins with Totto-chan's mother coming to know of her daughter's expulsion from public school. Her mother realizes that Totto-chan needs a school where more freedom of expression is permitted. Thus, she takes Totto-chan to meet the headmaster of the new school, Mr. Kobayashi, where the two establish a friendly teacher-student relationship.

The book describes the friends Totto-chan makes, the lessons she learns, and the vibrant atmosphere she enjoys at Tomoe Gakuen. Mr. Kobayashi introduces new activities to interest the pupils. Mr. Kobayashi understands children and strives to develop their minds and bodies. He is concerned for the physically disabled and emphasizes how all children are remarkable. "Totto-chan" becomes best friends with a Christian boy who has polio. Another classmate was raised in America and cannot speak Japanese; the headmaster tells the children to learn English from him, despite governmental restraints against using the "enemy's" language. The epilogue explains how Headmaster Kobayashi had good connections with leaders in government.

In this school, the children lead happy lives, unaware of the things going on in the world. It is the year 1941, World War II has started, yet no signs of it are seen. There are hints of something awry when "Totto-chan" cannot buy caramel candies from the vending machine on her way to school, and it becomes harder for her mother to meet the requirements for a balanced lunch. In another scene, a boy is bawling his eyes out at being removed from the school by his parents. Headmaster Kobayashi helplessly lets the student vent, with tears forming in his own eyes.

One day, the school is bombed, and is never rebuilt, even though the headmaster claims that he is looking forward to building an even better school the next time round. This ends Totto-chan's years as a pupil at Tomoe Gakuen.

== Use in classrooms ==
Starting in 1983, it has been used as a textbook for third-year Japanese elementary students, and at least one American school has used material from it (1993).

In Aichi Prefecture the book was banned from school libraries for some time because it was written by a television personality, which was seen as a demeaning occupation. Other books banned from Aichi schools in 1981 include books about liberalism and feminism, and Saburō Ienaga's history textbooks which provided details on Japanese war crimes.

== Related works ==
Kuroyanagi founded the Totto-chan Foundation, which assists people with disabilities, focusing on deafness, provides Japanese Sign Language lessons, and runs the Japanese Theatre of the deaf, which professionally trains deaf actors to bring live theater to the deaf community.

In 1999, Kuroyanagi published her book Totto-Chan's Children: A Goodwill Journey to the Children of the World, about her travels around the world on her humanitarian mission as a UNICEF Goodwill Ambassador.

An orchestral interpretation of the work was written by Japanese composer Akihiro Komori, which was released as a record.

An anime film adaptation was announced on March 20, 2023. It was produced by Shin-Ei Animation and directed by Shinnosuke Yakuwa, with Yakuwa and Yosuke Suzuki writing the scripts, Shizue Kaneko designing the characters, and Yuji Nomi composing the soundtrack. It was released on December 8, 2023.

== Sequel ==
Kuroyanagi released a sequel 42 years later in October 2023, entitled Totto-chan: The Little Girl at the Window: The Sequel (Japanese: 続 窓ぎわのトットちゃん). The book covers Kuroyanagi's life after the first book, including her experience with a lack of food and the Tokyo firebombing during World War II, her evacuation to Aomori Prefecture, her time in music school, her early career, and her experience studying abroad in New York. Kuroyanagi became motivated to write about her wartime experiences after the 2022 Russian Invasion of Ukraine, saying, "If children hate anything, it's a lack of freedom. I hated war. I think that's why I decided to write the sequel."

The book was translated into Chinese in 2024, and an English translation by Yuki Tejima was released in 2025.

== Translations ==
- तोत्तो-चान : खिड़की में खड़ी नन्ही लड़की― Hindi translation by Purva Yagnik Kushwaha.
- तोत्तो-चान : खिडकी पासची चिमुरडी― Marathi translation by Chetana Sardeshmukh Gosavi.
- ತೊತ್ತೋ‌ ಚಾನ್― Kannada translation by V Gayathri.
- හරි පුදුම ඉස්කෝලේ (The Wonderful School) - Sinhala Sri Lankan translation by Leelananda Gamachchi.
- তোত্তো-চান― Bengali translation by Moushumi Bhowmik.
- তোত্তোচান: জানালার ধারে ছোট্ট মেয়েটি Bengali translation by Chaity Rahman
- โต๊ะโตะจัง เด็กหญิงข้างหน้าต่าง Thai translation by Pusadee Navavijit
- तोत्तो-चान,झ्यालमा रमाउने त्यो सानी केटी. Nepali Nepali translation by Dr. Saroj Dhital.
- 'ஜன்னலில் ஒரு சிறுமி' - Tamil Language translation by A Vallinayagam, C. Prabhakaran
- 'ടോട്ടോ-ചാൻ - ജനാലയ്ക്കരികിലെ വികൃതിക്കുട്ടി Malayalam Language translation by Anwar Ali first published by Kerala Shastra Sahitya Parishad and later by NBS
- ত’ত্ত’চ্চান - Assamese translation by Toshprabha Kalita.
- توت تو چان - کھڑکی پر کھڑی چھوٹی سی لڑکی - Urdu translation by Tahera Hasan published by National book trust India, first Urdu edition in 1999 and second in 2008.
- توتوچان: دخترکی آن سوی پنجره - Persian translation by Simin Mohseni (978-964-185-257-5)
- مدرسه رؤیایی: توتوچان دختر کوچکی پشت پنجره - Persian Translation by Soussan Firoozi (978-600-119-569-3)
