= Tetsuko Kuroyanagi =

Japanese actress (born 1933)

- 黒柳 徹子
- Kuroyanagi in 2020
- Born: August 9, 1933 (age 93); Tokyo City, Tokyo Prefecture, Empire of Japan
- Occupations: Actress; voice actress; television personality
- Years active: 1953–present

Tetsuko Kuroyanagi (黒柳 徹子, Kuroyanagi Tetsuko; born August 9, 1933) is a Japanese actress and television personality. She has hosted the television program Tetsuko's Room (徹子の部屋, Tetsuko no Heya) since 1975.

She joined NHK Broadcasting Theatre Company as the first television actress in 1953. In 1954, she made her debut as the lead actress in the radio drama Yambō Nimbō Tombō. In 1976, TV Asahi's Tetsuko's Room started airing. This program was recognized by the Guinness World Records in 2011 for having the highest number of broadcasts by the same host. It has been airing on weekdays at noon every week, and as of 2023, it has surpassed 11,000 episodes in its 48th year. Her autobiographical book, Totto-Chan: The Little Girl at the Window, which depicts her childhood, became a post-WW2 bestseller with over 8 million copies sold in Japan and 25 million copies worldwide. It has also been adapted into a television series twice.

A World Wide Fund for Nature advisor and Goodwill Ambassador for UNICEF, she is known for her charitable works, and is considered one of the first Japanese celebrities to achieve international recognition. In 2006, Donald Richie referred to Kuroyanagi in his book Japanese Portraits: Pictures of Different People as "the most popular and admired woman in Japan."

== Early life ==
Kuroyanagi was born in Tokyo City, Tokyo Prefecture (now Tokyo), the daughter of Moritsuna and Chō Kuroyanagi. Her father Moritsuna was a violinist and a concertmaster. Her nickname as a child was Totto-chan, according to her 1981 autobiographical memoir.

== Education ==
Kuroyanagi studied at the Tokyo College of Music, majoring in opera, as she intended to become an opera singer. After graduation, however, she was drawn to acting and the television entertainment industry by her joining Tokyo Hoso Gekidan. Subsequently, she became the first Japanese actress who was contracted to Japan Broadcasting Corporation (NHK).

== Career ==
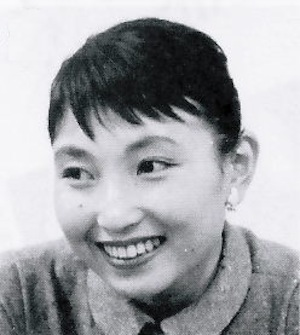
Kuroyanagi in her youth

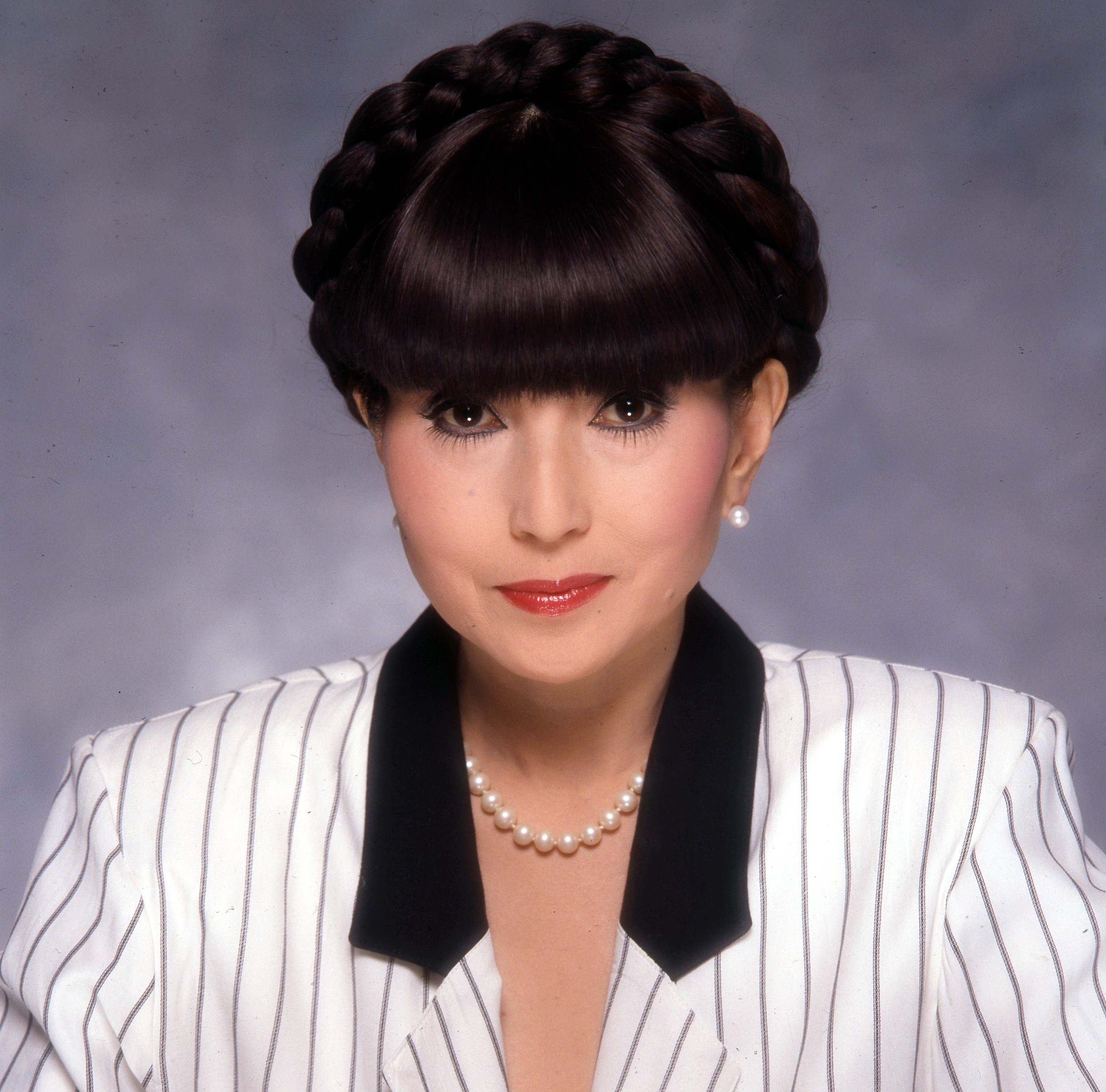
Kuroyanagi in her middle age

After voicing Lady Penelope in the Thunderbirds TV series, Kuroyanagi first became well known in 1975 when she established her afternoon television program Tetsuko's Room (徹子の部屋, Tetsuko no Heya), which was the first talk show on Japanese television. The show was broadcast by the private television channel TV Asahi, and featured Kuroyanagi's discussions with celebrities from various fields, including television, sport and politics. Tetsuko's Room was very successful, and Kuroyanagi started to be referred to as a "phenomenon" in Japan, in contradiction to the image of "servile" and "wifely" women on Japanese television". Statistics show that, by the early 1990s, Kuroyanagi had interviewed over two thousand Japanese and foreign guests. It is acknowledged that her warmness as an interviewer and skilled art of talking is a factor that made the TV program live long. She is also familiar to Japanese audiences with her regular appearance on the television quiz show "World Mysteries".

1981 marked a turning point in her career, as Kuroyanagi published her children book Totto-Chan: The Little Girl at the Window, in which Kuroyanagi wrote about the values of the unconventional education that she received at Tomoe Gakuen elementary school during World War II, and her teacher Sosaku Kobayashi. The book is considered her childhood memoir, and upon release, it became the bestselling book in Japanese history. The book was first translated to English in 1984 by Dorothy Britton, and it was published in more than 30 countries. 42 years later, in 2023, she published a sequel covering her life after the first book, including her experiences during World War II and her early career.

== Charitable works ==
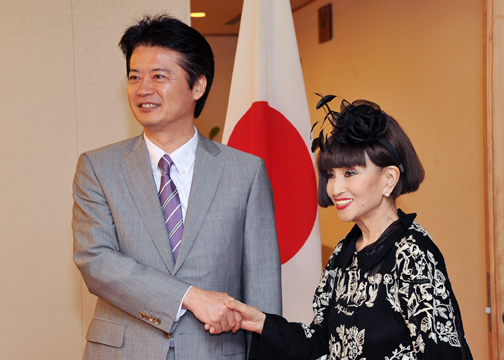
With Kōichirō Gemba (at the Ministry of Foreign Affairs on 5 July 2012)

Kuroyanagi is known internationally for her charitable and fund raising works. She founded the Totto Foundation, named for the eponymous and autobiographical protagonist of her book Totto-chan, the Little Girl at the Window. The Foundation provides assistance to those with disabilities, particularly deafness, and professionally trains deaf actors and holds deaf theater performances. Kuroyanagi has twice brought America's National Theater of the Deaf to Japan, acting with them in sign language.

In 1984, in recognition of her charitable works, Kuroyanagi was appointed to be a Goodwill Ambassador for UNICEF, being the first person from Asia to hold this position. During the late 1980s and the 1990s, she visited many developing countries in Asia and Africa for charitable works and goodwill missions, helping children who had suffered from disasters and war as well as raising international awareness of the situations of children in poor countries. Her visit to Angola in 1989 was the first recorded VIP visit from Japan to this country, and marked a milestone for the diplomatic relation between Japan and Angola. Kuroyanagi has raised more than $20 million for the UNICEF programmes that she has been involved in, through television fund-raising campaigns. She also used the royalties from her bestselling book, Totto-chan, to contribute to UNICEF. Kuroyanagi also participated in the international UNICEF ‘Say Yes for Children’ campaign, along with other celebrities.

In 1997, Kuroyanagi published the book "Totto-chan's Children", which was based on her experience working for as a UNICEF Goodwill Ambassador from 1984 to 1996. Kuroyanagi is a director of the Japanese branch of the World Wildlife Fund.

== Honours ==
For her involvement in media and television entertainment, Kuroyanagi won the Japanese Cultural Broadcasting Award, which is the highest television honour in Japan. Since then, she has been voted 14 times as Japan's favourite television personality, for the show Tetsuko's Room.

In 2000, Kuroyanagi became the first recipient of the Global Leadership for Children Award, which was established by UNICEF in the 10th anniversary of the 1990 World Summit for Children. In May 2003, Kuroyanagi received Order of the Sacred Treasure in recognition of her two decades of service for the world's children.

== Filmography ==
This is a partial list of films.

- Thunderbirds (voice actor) (1965–1966) - Lady Penelope Creighton-Ward (Japanese dub)
- Jack and the Witch (voice actor) (1967)
- Breaking of Branches Is Forbidden (voice actor) (1968, dir. Kihachirō Kawamoto)
- Summer Soldiers (1972)
- Anne no Nikki (The Diary of Anne Frank) as Mrs. Petronella Van Daan (voice actor) (1995)
- The Book of the Dead (voice actor) (2005)
