= The Mole Song: Final =

2021 Japanese action comedy film

- Film poster
- Directed by: Takashi Miike
- Written by: Kankurō Kudō
- Based on: Mogura no Uta by Noboru Takahashi
- Starring: Toma Ikuta
- Cinematography: Nobuyasu Kita
- Edited by: Naoichiro Sagara
- Music by: Koji Endo
- Production companies: Fuji Television; J Storm; Oriental Light and Magic; Rakueisha Co. Shogakukan
- Distributed by: Toho Company
- Release date: November 19, 2021 (Japan)
- Running time: 129 minutes
- Country: Japan
- Language: Japanese

The Mole Song: Final (Japanese: 土竜の唄 FINAL, Hepburn: Mogura no uta: Final) is a 2021 Japanese action comedy film directed by Takashi Miike from a screenplay by Kankuro Kudo based on the popular manga series Mogura no Uta by Noboru Takahashi. It is the final film in the trilogy beginning with the 2013 film The Mole Song: Undercover Agent Reiji and continued in the 2017 film The Mole Song: Hong Kong Capriccio.

== Plot ==
Undercover investigator Reiji Kikukawa, nicknamed "The Mole", learns that Shuho Todoroki, head of the Sukiya-kai, plans to purchase a shipping container full of 10 tons of amphetamines disguised as pasta being sold by the Italian Guillotina Family led by Don Razza. Reiji is tasked by the police with catching Shuho Todoroki and arresting him at the deal, thereby postponing Reiji's return to normal life as well as his marriage proposal to his girlfriend Junna.

At the time of the transaction, Shuho's son Leo arrives to perform the deal instead. Reiji realizes that Shuho is safely aboard the Costa Firenze, which cannot be searched by the Japanese police because it is sailing under an Italian flag. Reiji makes his way aboard, where Junna is on a singles' cruise in an attempt to forget about Reiji.

Masaya Hiura, a.k.a. "Crazy Papillon", seeks to eliminate yakuza members involved in the illegal drug trade and attempts to shoot Shuho Todoroki, but Reiji needs Shuho alive in order to arrest him, so Reiji stops Masaya by confessing that he has been a mole for their entire friendship.

Shuho is eventually arrested and Masaya continues his crusade against drug-dealing yakuza members. Reiji returns to the police force, while Junna is promoted and becomes his superior.

== Cast ==
- Toma Ikuta as Reiji Kikukawa
- Kenichi Endō as Kazumi Akagiri
- Mitsuru Fukikoshi as Toshio Sakami
- Koichi Iwaki as Shuho Todoroki
- Sarutoki Minagawa as Doppo Fukuzumi
- Riisa Naka as Junna Wakagi
- Nanao as Kochou
- Takashi Okamura as Seiichi Nekozawa
- Ryohei Suzuki as Retsuo Todoroki
- Karen Takizawa as Tama Samon
- Susumu Terajima as Akio Sakuno (photograph)
- Shinichi Tsutsumi as Masaya Hiura
- Daniela Aiko as Rosaria
- Giuseppe Durato as Interpreter
- Paolo Andrea Di Pietro as Appraiser

== Release ==
The film was released in Japan on November 19, 2021.

== Reception ==
In a positive review, reviewer Marina D. Richter of asianmoviepulse.com wrote, "Enjoy the soft cooked pasta seasoned by all outwordly ingredients from Takashi Miike's action comedy kitchen, and remember that there are no limits to using whatever songs to the soundtrack of a film if you are convinced enough they would work. ... May the giant manta ray be with you, and do not miss the opportunity the watch this film should the possibility presents itself!"

Reviewer Ard Vijn of Screen Anarchy wrote, "Miike Takashi's latest is a crude bombardment of slapstick, meaning it's a perfect ending to this particular trilogy. ... It's all goofy as hell, Miike knows it, and he fully embraces it. ... Watching these three guys bombing, shooting, kicking and head-butting each other through a multitude of expensive sets while wearing the most amazingly gaudy suits is just very enjoyable."

Reviewer Niels Matthijs of onderhond.com gave the film 4 out of 5 stars, writing, "The Mole Song: Final won't disappoint fans of the earlier installments, even if it doesn't really manage to one-up the previous parts. ... The Mole Song: Final is exactly what it should be. There are no big surprises, no great franchise-bending twists or novel takes on a tired old concept. Instead, you get a vibrant blockbuster that conforms to genre standards, while leaving Miike enough room to insert his signature elements. The definition of pure and unfiltered entertainment."

Reviewer Tim Chuma of impulsegamer.com gave the film 4 out of 5 stars, writing, "This movie is heaps of fun and if you like crime, action and comedy you are sure to have a good time even if you are not big into Yakuza films."

Reviewer Jennie Kermode of eyeforfilm.co.uk gave the film 3.5 out of 5 stars, writing, "Despite the film's exuberant silliness, Takashi is always meticulous about his craft. There are some nicely structured action scenes here and he makes great use of the extant visual language of police and secret agent films. Violent interludes assure us that the threat posed by the gangsters is real, and in his quieter moments, Tôma succeeds in conveying some of the real sadness associated with long term undercover work."

Reviewer Sean Gilman of inreviewonline.com wrote, "These films, Final as much as the previous two, aren't so much parodies or, god forbid, subversions of the gangster genre as much as they claim familiar structures and characters as an excuse to create things no sane filmmaker has ever thought of putting on screen. The endless slapstick and cornball humor can grow tiresome, as can Ikuta's mugging, especially at the 130-minute running time each entry in the series has. And sure, Miike has made better movies over this past decade, and he's made movies that are more consistently fun, and he's made movies that are much weirder. But the point is, nobody makes movies like Takashi Miike."

Reviewer Grant Watson of fictionmachine.com wrote, "Takashi Miike's madcap comedy trilogy The Mole Song finally reaches a conclusion with this climactic instalment [sic]. While it lacks the sheer surfeit of energy and throwaway ideas that typified Undercover Agent Reiji (2013) and Hong Kong Capriccio (2016), it remains consistently funny and entertaining. This particular well of comedy has not run dry, so to speak, but you can see the bottom if you peer in. It's good to see it wind up in a solid and enjoyable fashion."
