= Reiji Yamada =

Japanese manga artist

- Area: Manga artist
- Notable works: Zetsubō ni Kiku Kusuri

Reiji Yamada (山田玲司, Yamada Reiji; born January 1, 1966 in Tokyo) is a Japanese manga artist. His first big hit was a romantic comedy B Virgin, and he is also known for the manga adaptation of Zebraman. He is very concerned with societal problems, and has spent the last several years drawing Zetsubō ni Kiku Kusuri, a series of manga interviews with people he believes are setting a positive example.

== Works ==
Title	Year	Notes	Refs
B virgin (Bバージン)	TBD	Serialized in Young Sunday Comics, 16 volumes	
Zetsubō ni Kiku Kusuri	2003–present	Serialized in Weekly Young Sunday; Published by Shogakukan in 10 volumes	
Agapeizu AGAPES (アガペイズAGAPES)	TBD	Serialized in Young Sunday Comics, 9 volumes	
B virgin wide version (Bバージンワイド版)	TBD	Serialized in Young Sunday Comics, 9 volumes	
Art college entrance exam Senki Ariene (美大受験戦記アリエネ)	TBD	Serialized in Big Comics, 8 volumes	
NG	TBD	Serialized in Young Sunday Comics, 5 volumes	
Zebraman; Manga adaptation. Original story by Kankuro Kudo.	TBD	Serialized in Big Comics / Big spirits Comics, 5 volumes	
Gold Panthers; Manga. Original story by Kankuro Kudo	TBD	Serialized in Young Sunday Comics, 3 volumes	
Rabbit to stop the coconut period global warming (ココナッツピリオド地球温暖化を止めるウサギ)	TBD	Serialized in Big Comics, 3 volumes	
Dolphin Brain (ドルフィン・ブレイン)	TBD	Serialized in Shonen Sunday Comics Special, 2 volumes	
17 Avenue of the scene (17番街の情景)	TBD	Serialized in Treasure Island comic, 1 volume	
Indigo Blues (インディゴ・ブルース)	TBD	Serialized in Treasure Island comic, 1 volume	
Armadillo tree (アルマジロの木)	TBD	Serialized in 1 volume	
Birds of water (水の鳥)	TBD	Serialized in 1 volume	
Zebraman 2 Strikes Back Zebra City (ゼブラーマン2ゼブラシティの逆襲)	TBD	Serialized in Big Spirits Comics Special, 1 volume	
Stripper (ストリッパー)	TBD	Serialized in Young Sunday Comics, 1 volume	
17 Avenue of the scene Complete Edition (17番街の情景コンプリート・エディション)	TBD	Serialized in 1 volume	
B virgin (Bバージン) with 上田享矢	TBD	Serialized in Young Sunday Comics, 1 volume	
Mote no woman is a sin (モテない女は罪である)	TBD	Serialized in 1 volume	
Super Super Blue Hearts (スーパースーパーブルーハーツ)	TBD	Serialized in Shonen Sunday Comics Special, 1 volume	
NG gigolo of Holy Scripture (NGジゴロの教典)	TBD	Serialized in Young Sunday Comics, 0 volumes	
