= Assistant Inspector: Daimajin =

- Poster
- 警部補ダイマジン
- Genre: Detective fiction
- Based on: Keibuho Daimajin by Richard Wu and Kōji Konō
- Screenplay by: Yūichi Tokunaga
- Directed by: Takashi Miike; Ryūsuke Kurahashi
- Starring: Toma Ikuta
- Theme music composer: Kanjani Eight (main theme); Atarashii Gakko! (opening theme)
- Composer: Koji Endo
- Country of origin: Japan
- Original language: Japanese
- No. of episodes: 8

Production
- Producers: Tatsuya Gotō; Fumio Inoue; Shigeji Maeda; Misako Saka
- Cinematography: Nobuyasu Kita
- Editor: Naoichirō Sagara
- Running time: 56 minutes
- Production company: OLM

Original release
- Network: TV Asahi
- Release: July 7 – September 1, 2023

Assistant Inspector: Daimajin (警部補ダイマジン, Keibuho Daimajin; Assistant Inspector: Daimajin) is a 2023 Japanese eight-episode detective television series based on the manga of the same name. Six episodes were directed by Takashi Miike and two episodes were directed by Ryūsuke Kurahashi. It originally aired from July 7 to September 1, 2023.

== Synopsis ==
Ace inspector Jin Daiba, known as Daimajin, uses extrajudicial methods to punish criminals who are beyond the reach of the law and seemingly untouchable. He is put in a special investigation unit that discovers criminal activity deep within the police force and the government itself, even uncovering a secret society.

== Cast ==
- Toma Ikuta as Jin Daiba a.k.a. Daimajin (Assistant Inspector)
- Osamu Mukai as Hirayasu Saimon (Chief of Special Investigation Task Force)
- Tao Tsuchiya as Tanabata Yuka (Detective)
- Yukiyoshi Ozawa as Urabe Takanori (Inspector of Criminal Investigation Information Analysis General Center
- Kavka Shishido as Kaku Sakura (Lieutenant of Special Investigation Task Force)
- Kenta Hamano as Botan Noriyuki (Inspector of Special Investigation Task Force)
- Ken Matsudaira as Kumota Taizo (Superintendent of Forensic Research Institute)
- Katsunori Takahashi as Nagiri Yukito (Director of Ministry of Public Security)
- Riko Narumi as Takada Miwako (Jin's ex-wife / Lawyer)
- Renn Kiriyama as Seike Shingo (Minister)
- Ema Fujisawa as Hirayasu Ayako (Saimon's mother)
- Tsurutaro Kataoka as Anamizu Seigen (Former head of the Cabinet Special Affairs Office)
- Shin Takuma as Amo Dai (CEO of AMO Security)
- Makiko Kuno as Yukiko Suda
- Masanori Ishii as Gota Isono
- Tamura Kentaro as Masaharu Kajiyama
- Taro Suwa as Taro Takeda (episodes 1 & 3)
- Yuka Takeshima as Yukiko Funada (episodes 1 & 5)
- Masayuki Ito as Yosuke Hatano (episodes 2 & 4)
- Youhei Kumabe as informant (episode 2)
- Hajime Inoue as Koichi Sakuraba (episode 3)
- Masahiro Toda as Sumio Kawamoto (episodes 4 & 5)
- Masanori Mimoto as Akio Naito (episode 4)
- Issei Okihara as man (episodes 4 & 5)
- Yuichiro Nakayama as Hideo Tsukamoto (episodes 6 & 7)
- Gō Rijū as Imai (episode 6)
- Hatsunori Hasegawa as Shinzaburo Sakai (episode 7)
- Masatoshi Kihara as black mask man (episodes 7 & 8)
- Akio Otsuka as Kazuma Mitamura (episode 8)

== Episodes ==
No.	Title	Directed by	Original release date
1	"生田斗真×三池崇史!最凶のダークヒーロー誕生! ("Toma Ikuta × Takashi Miike! The Birth of the Most Evil Dark Hero!")"	Takashi Miike	July 7, 2023
Jin Daiba finds images on the computer of Amo Dai, the Senior Commissioner of the Metropolitan Police Investigation, linking Dai to decades of child abductions. Knowing that Dai's wealth and political influence will enable him to avoid a criminal penalty, Jin Daiba personally strangles the man with a rope and stages the scene to look like a suicide. Jin Daiba is brought in as part of the 1 Special Unit to investigate the crime scene and quickly asserts that it looks like a suicide. Hirayasu Saimon, head of the 1 Special Unit has been surveilling Jin Daiba and knows that he is connected to Amo Dai's death, but tells Jin Daiba that he will not reveal this information. Hirayasu's father may be involved in a series of attacks in 1987. 1 Special Unit has learned that Amo was a member of the secret society 44, founded by the Japanese Imperial Army during World War II.
2	"暴力装置 ("Violent Device")"	Takashi Miike	July 14, 2023
1 Special Unit investigates a series of deaths of CEOs, all of whom were earning over one billion yen. Daiba learns that a shareholder in the companies of the CEOs has been benefiting from their deaths.
3	"三田村一馬 ("Kazuma Mitamura")"	Ryūsuke Kurahashi	July 28, 2023
Daiba saves a woman from being attacked by two men, but then the woman tells the police that Daiba beat up the men for no reason.
4	"共犯者 ("Accomplice")"	Takashi Miike	August 4, 2023
Tanabata Yuka's recording of Daiba proves his innocence.
5	"脅威 ("Threat")"	Ryūsuke Kurahashi	August 11, 2023
6	"議定書 ("Protocol")"	Takashi Miike	August 18, 2023
7	"裏切者 ("Traitor")"	Takashi Miike	August 25, 2023
8	"反撃開始 ("The Counterattack Begins")"	Takashi Miike	September 1, 2023

== Production ==
The series is based on the manga series Keibuho Daimajin by Richard Wu and Kōji Konō. The series reunited Toma Ikuta and Osamu Mukai, who had previously worked together on the 2008 series Honey and Clover. Filming took place in Tokyo, Japan. The main theme song of the series is "Ookami to Suisei" ("Wolf & the Comet") by Kanjani Eight. The opening theme is performed by Atarashii Gakko!.

In an interview with Cinemore about the series, Miike stated, "It was a drama adaptation of an original work, but it wasn't a movie, a V-cinema, or even a TV series, so it felt somehow freer. This time, the complete version was streamed online, which is different from previous catch-up streaming. TV dramas are exploring different directions, and I thought this was part of that experiment. [...] It had a nostalgic feel to it. The way it hits you head-on reminded me of the works of Kajiwara Ikki, who is of my generation, and it was easy to read. I enjoyed reading it, but I think it would be quite difficult to adapt it into a drama."

Discussing his own performance, star Toma Ikuta said, "I want to convey the suppressed energy and the ferocity that seems ready to break free of chains and burst forth. [...] I want to create a work that makes people think, 'Wow, it's OK to do this on TV!' and get their blood pumping."

Discussing his own performance, Osamu Mukai said, "When I thought about the fact that Daiba and Heian are two completely different types of people on the same screen, I had to look at Ikuta's acting and do something different. Conversely, I felt that Heian might be able to make up for what Daiba can't, so rather than creating the role alone, I felt it was better to add and subtract on the spot each time."

== Broadcast ==
The opening scene of the first episode of the series, lasting 4 minutes and 40 seconds and culminating in Daiba's killing of Amo Dai, was released in advance on TV Asahi's YouTube channel on July 3, 2023.

The series was broadcast on TV Asahi on Fridays at 23:15 from July 7 to September 1, 2023. Lead actor Toma Ikuta gave a live commentary via Instagram during the broadcast of the first episode.

At the same time, the online streaming service Telasa streamed Detective Daimajin Complete Edition, which included unreleased scenes and behind-the-scenes footage. Telasa also streamed a conversation between lead actor Toma Ikuta and director Takashi Miike titled "Detective Daimajin Special Interview" on July 5, 2023, ahead of the broadcast of the series.

== Viewership ==
The first episode reached number one on TVer's drama rankings within two days of its release, and became the fastest Friday-night drama to reach 1 million views.

== Reception ==
In a review for the website Asian Movie Pulse, reviewer Panos Kotzathanasis wrote, "Ultimately, 'Inspector Daimajin' is not without flaws. Its comedic tone and far-fetched script sometimes undermine its narrative weight, while the overabundance of characters and twists risks overwhelming the story. Nevertheless, the appealing protagonists, entertaining action, and intriguing moral dilemmas keep it engaging. In the end, it is a drama that fans of Miike and crime comedies will find highly enjoyable."

Reviewing the first episode, a reviewer for realsound.com wrote, "The opening scene of the first episode, in which Daiba carries out the murder of Amano with the words 'perfect crime, a success', symbolizes Daiba as a dark hero who 'defeats evil with evil'. However, what made the biggest impression on me in this first episode was the scene in which Heian Saimon (Mukai Osamu) points at Daiba and says, 'Detective Daimajin. You're a murderer!' The camera moves from Heian's fingertip to Daiba's line of sight, and his eyes slowly become cloudy. His public face as a detective inspector and his private face as he personally passes down judgment. The transitions and different acting styles are the charm of this work, and I had a feeling that this would be a new side of Ikuta Toma."
