= Sarutoki Minagawa =

Japanese actor (born 1971)

- 皆川 猿時
- Born: February 1, 1971 (age 55); Fukushima Prefecture, Japan
- Occupation: Actor
- Years active: 1994–present
- Employer: Otona Keikaku

Sarutoki Minagawa (Japanese: 皆川 猿時, Hepburn: Minagawa Sarutoki; born 1 February 1971) is a Japanese actor. He worked with Suzuki Matsuo in the theater group, Otona Keikaku.

== Filmography ==
=== Film ===
- Drugstore Girl (2004)
- Yaji and Kita: The Midnight Pilgrims (2005)
- Death Note (2006)
- Pile Driver (2007)
- Climber's High (2008) - Yasuo Ito
- Hidden Fortress: The Last Princess (2008)
- Lala Pipo (2009)
- No More Cry!!! (2009)
- Kanikosen (2009) - job manager
- Afro Tanaka (2012) - Shinji Nishida
- Maruyama, The Middle Schooler (2013) - Hosono
- Joshi Zu (2014) - Kimihiko Domyoji
- The Mole Song: Undercover Agent Reiji (2014) - Doppo Fukuzumi
- Bakuman (2015) - Takuro Nakai
- A Farewell to Jinu (2015) - Aoto
- The Mole Song: Hong Kong Capriccio (2016) - Doppo Fukuzumi
- Hentai Kamen: Abnormal Crisis (2016)
- Too Young to Die! (2016) - Junko
- Good-Bye (2020)
- Fukushima 50 (2020)
- Yowamushi Pedal (2020)
- Mother (2020)
- Your Turn to Kill: The Movie (2021)
- The Mole Song: Final (2021) - Doppo Fukuzumi
- Wedding High (2022) - Shirō Inoue
- Winny (2023)
- Secret: A Hidden Score (2024), Yamamoto
- Honeko Akabane's Bodyguards (2024), Tanaka
- Fureru (2024), Wakita (voice)
- Angry Squad: The Civil Servant and the Seven Swindler (2024)

=== Television ===
- Legal High (2012) - Taihei Tokumatsu
- Resident: Story of 5 Interns (2012) - Kenji
- Ghost Negotiator Tenma (2013) - Keizo Daikaku
- Amachan (2013) - Shinbei Isono
- Yoshiwara Uradoshin (2014) - Sogoro Fujimura
- Water Polo Yankees (2014) - Toshio Iwasaki
- Bitter Blood (2014) - Kaoru Togashi
- Chushingura: A 48th Loyal Retainer in Love (2016-2017) - Zoemon Sato
- The Angel of Money (2016) - Sadao Uozumi
- Idaten (2019) - Ikkaku Matsuzawa
- Your Turn to Kill (2019)
- Ranman (2023) - Iwasaki Yanosuke
- The Laughing Salesman (2025)
