= Koichi Iwaki =

Japanese actor (born 1951)

Kōichi Iwaki
- Born: Lee Gwon-il (이권일); March 21, 1951 (age 75); Tokyo, Japan
- Occupation: Actor

Kōichi Iwaki (岩城滉一, Iwaki Kōichi) is a Japanese actor. He won the award for best actor at the 8th Yokohama Film Festival for the 1986 film Minami e Hashire, Umi no Michi o. He was a Zainichi Korean until April 5, 2017, when he naturalized. Iwaki is also a racing car driver.

== Filmography ==
=== Films ===
- The Doberman Cop (1977)
- Proof of the Man (1977), Kori Kyohei
- The Resurrection of the Golden Wolf (1979)
- Minami e Hashire, Umi no Michi o! (1986), Tomishima Ryo
- Family (2001)
- Family 2 (2001)
- Kikoku (2003)
- The Mole Song: Undercover Agent Reiji (2014)
- The Mole Song: Hong Kong Capriccio (2016)
- Back Street Girls: Gokudols (2019), Inukinoni Manjiro
- The Mole Song: Final (2021)
- Last Turn (2024), Kenji Fukuyama
- Zagin de Shisu!? (2024)

=== Television ===
- Kita no Kuni kara (1981–2002), Sōta Kitamura
- Kinjirareta Asobi (1995)
- Asunaro Hakusho (1993)
- Good Luck!! (2003), Mizushima Kousaku
- My Boss My Hero (2006), Minami Takayuki (Principal)
- Miss Pilot (2013), Shinozaki Kazutoyo
