= Mitsuru Fukikoshi =

Japanese actor (born 1965)

- 吹越 満
- Born: February 17, 1965 (age 61); Kamikita District, Aomori, Japan
- Occupation: Actor
- Years active: 1984–present
- Spouse: Reona Hirota

Mitsuru Fukikoshi (吹越 満, Fukikoshi Mitsuru; born February 17, 1965) is a Japanese actor.

== Career ==
Born in Aomori Prefecture, Fukikoshi moved to Tokyo at age 19 and joined the Wahaha Honpo theater troupe. Since leaving Wahaha in 1999, he has appeared in many films and television dramas, while continuing to act on stage. He works in both serious drama and comedy, and has often played police detectives.

He starred in Sion Sono's Cold Fish. He co-starred with Hideaki Itō in Takashi Miike's Lesson of the Evil.

== Personal life ==
In 1994, Fukikoshi married the actress Reona Hirota. They divorced in 2005 after having one child, but then remarried in 2012. The couple separated for the second time in December 2016.

== Filmography ==
=== Film ===
- Gamera 2: Attack of Legion (1996)
- Love & Pop (1998)
- Samurai Fiction (1998)
- Whiteout (2000)
- Red Shadow (2001)
- The Twilight Samurai (2002)
- Spy Sorge (2003)
- Lady Joker (2004)
- Year One in the North (2005)
- Limit of Love: Umizaru (2006)
- Kabei: Our Mother (2008)
- The Chasing World (2008)
- Yoroi Samurai Zombie (2008)
- Sweet Rain (2008)
- Love Exposure (2008)
- Shinjuku Incident (2009)
- Asahiyama Zoo Story: Penguins in the Sky (2009)
- Ballad (2009)
- My Rainy Days (2009)
- Listen to My Heart (2009)
- Last Operations Under the Orion (2009)
- Cold Fish (2010)
- Heaven's Story (2010)
- Himizu (2011)
- Antoki no Inochi (2011)
- Unfair 2: The Answer (2011)
- Afro Tanaka (2012)
- Space Brothers (2012)
- Land of Hope (2012)
- Lesson of the Evil (2012)
- The Mole Song: Undercover Agent Reiji (2014)
- Age Harassment (2015)
- The Mole Song: Hong Kong Capriccio (2016)
- Mori, The Artist's Habitat (2018)
- Lady in White (2018)
- According to Our Butler (2019)
- A Girl Missing (2019)
- The Gun 2020 (2020)
- Angry Rice Wives (2021)
- Between Us (2021)
- The Mole Song: Final (2021)
- Red Post on Escher Street (2021)
- The Flower in the Sky (2022), Sakutarō Hagiwara
- Motherhood (2022)
- We Make Antiques! Osaka Dreams (2023)
- Twilight Cinema Blues (2023)
- Winny (2023), Masashi Akita
- Revolver Lily (2023)
- Love Will Tear Us Apart (2023)
- I Ai (2024)
- Angry Squad: The Civil Servant and the Seven Swindlers (2024)
- Frontline: Yokohama Bay (2025)
- After the Quake (2025)
- Bring Him Down to a Portable Size (2025)
- The Key (2026), Kenmochi
- Cry Out (2026)
- It's All Bananas! (2026)

=== Television ===
- Hojo Tokimune (2001), Prince Munetaka
- Dondo Hare (2007)
- Deka Wanko (2011)
- Inu o Kau to Iu Koto (2011)
- Amachan (2013)
- Gunshi Kanbei (2014), Ashikaga Yoshiaki
- Moribito: Guardian of the Spirit (2016), Gakai
- Specialist (2016), Hiroki Takidō
- Naotora: The Lady Warlord (2017), Ono Masanao
- Hello, Detective Hedgehog (2017)
- Tokusou 9 (2018-present)
- Kishū Hanshu Tokugawa Yoshimune (2019), Yanagisawa Yoshiyasu
- Kishiryu Sentai Ryusoulger (2019), Naohisa Tatsui
- Idaten (2019)
- The Days (2023)
- What Will You Do, Ieyasu? (2023), Mōri Terumoto
- The Child of God Murmurs (2023)
- After the Quake (2025)
- Blood and Sweat (2026), Gen
- The Shogunate Rebel (2027), Utsugi Kageyoshi

=== Video games ===
- Yakuza 5 (2012), Naoki Katsuya
