= Dondo Hare =

- Genre: Drama
- Written by: Eriko Komatsu
- Starring: Manami Higa; Ren Osugi; Masako Mori; Asahi Uchida; Mikihisa Azuma; Akiko Hinagata; Ryunosuke Kamiki; Aki Takejō; Masayuki Suzuki; Mitsuru Fukikoshi; Hiroyuki Nagato; Mitsuko Kusabue; Nobuko Miyamoto
- Narrated by: Hana Kino
- Country of origin: Japan
- Original language: Japanese
- No. of episodes: 156

Production
- Running time: 15 minutes

Original release
- Network: NHK
- Release: April 2 – September 29, 2007

Dondo Hare (どんど晴れ) is a Japanese television drama that aired on NHK in 2007. It was the 76th Asadora.

== Cast ==
- Manami Higa as Natsumi Asakura
- Ren Osugi as Keigo Asakura, Natsumi's father
- Masako Mori as Fusako Asakura, Natsumi's mother
- Asahi Uchida as Masaki Kagami, Natsumi's husband
- Mikihisa Azuma as Shinichi Kagami
- Akiko Hinagata as Emiko Kagami
- Ryunosuke Kamiki as Tomoya Asakura, Natsumi's younger brother
- Aki Takejō as owner of the boarding house in Morioka
- Masayuki Suzuki as Kisunori Kagami
- Mitsuru Fukikoshi as Yujiro Imamoto
- Hiroyuki Nagato as Heiji
- Isao Sasaki as Masato Yoshizawa
- Mitsuko Kusabue as Katsuno Kagami, Masaki's grandmother
- Nobuko Miyamoto as Tamaki Kagami, Masaki's aunt

Preceded by Imo Tako Nankin	Asadora; 2 April 2007 – 29 September 2007	Succeeded by Chiritotechin
