= Megaton Musashi =

Japanese multimedia franchise

メガトン級ムサシ (Megaton-kyū Musashi)
- Genre: Mecha
- Created by: Level-5
- Anime television series
- Directed by: Akihiro Hino (chief); Shigeharu Takahashi
- Written by: Akihiro Hino
- Music by: Ken'ichirō Saigō
- Studio: OLM, Inc. Team Inoue
- Licensed by: Crunchyroll; EA/SEA: Medialink
- Original network: Tokyo MX, BS Fuji
- Original run: October 1, 2021 – March 17, 2023
- Episodes: 28
- Video game
- Developer: Level-5; h.a.n.d.
- Publisher: Level-5
- Produced by: Akihiro Hino
- Designed by: Takuzo Nagano
- Genre: Role-playing; action
- Engine: Unity
- Platform: Nintendo Switch; PlayStation 4; PlayStation 5; Windows
- Released: Switch, PS4, PS5: JP: November 11, 2021; WW: April 25, 2024; Windows: WW: April 25, 2024

Megaton Musashi (メガトン級ムサシ, Megaton-kyū Musashi) is a Japanese multimedia franchise by Level-5. An action role-playing video game was released in Japan for the Nintendo Switch, PlayStation 4 and PlayStation 5, in November 2021. A Free-to-play version, Megaton Musashi X(Cross) (メガトン級ムサシX(クロス), Megaton-kyū Musashi X(Kurosu)) was released on December 1, 2022, and the third version of the game, Megaton Musashi W(Wired) (メガトン級ムサシW(ワイアード), Megaton-kyū Musashi W(Waiādo)), was released for the Switch, PlayStation 4, PlayStation 5 and Windows on April 25, 2024. An anime adaptation produced by OLM, Inc. aired from October 2021 to March 2023.

== Synopsis ==
In the year 2118, the Earth has been invaded by an hostile alien called "Dractors" (ドラクターズ, Dorakutāzu), killing 99.9% of humanity during what would later be referred to as "The Day of Destruction" (滅亡の日, Metsubō no hi), as the surviving 1% of humanity are placed in fortified Shelters (シェルター, Sherutā) and have their memories of the invasion repressed via its memory manipulation technology, allowing them to live in peace while the unified world government and its forces fight back against the Draktors. The Dractors has since drilling a hole through Earth and replaces its core with an artificial one to xenoform it into a more suitable place for them to live, as such the state of the planet itself would be referred to as "Donut Earth" (ドーナッツ地球, Dōnattsu chikyū).

=== Plot ===
Yamato Ichidaiji, a hot-blooded and psychopathic teenager who has recently begun to experience flashbacks of the Draktor's invasion and the death of his family, is chosen to be one of the pilots for the newly developed Megaton-Class Rogues along with other chosen teens: Teru Asami, a calm, yet narcissistic teen with ties to the unified government; Ryugo Hijikata, a brawl-happy delinquent; Reiji Amemiya, a cat-loving pacifist; and Jun Kirishima, a feisty and talented girl. The fight between humanity and the Draktors will determine the fate of them and Earth, which becomes more complicated when Yamato meets runaway Draktor princess Arshem Laia, who strives for her people to coexist with humanity.

== Characters ==
=== Rogues ===
To protect humanity and turn the tide of war against the Draktors, the united world government built armored bipedal machines called Rogues, which are designed to be mass-produced and are used as cannon fodder for their more advanced successors.

Some time later, development on a series of next-generation Rogues aboard the Shelter Ixia was finished and later dubbed Megaton-Class Rogues, which are more powerful and durable due to being made from Megatonium, a type of metal said to be stronger than previously discovered metal.

Musashi
The titular mecha of the series, who is named after Miyamoto Musashi and primarily piloted by Yamato, with Teru and Ryugo also occasionally operating it before they receive the Sparkman and the Gaudia. Musashi is the "jack-of-all-traits" among Megaton-Class Rogues and wields twin swords, also possessing the ability to shoot a beam from the Diffusion Cannon in its torso. Unlike most Rogues, the Musashi has three components: the Upper Torso, the Arms and the Lower Torso, which must be assembled together on higher altitudes through the Sky Build (スカイビルド, Sukaibirudo) formation.
Arthur
A mecha named after King Arthur and primarily piloted by Reiji. It wields a sword and excels at close-quarters combat, and its centaur-like lower body gives it greater mobility and agility than other Megaton-Class Rogues.
Maximus
A mecha named after the Pontifex maximus and primarily piloted by Jun, with Momoka as co-pilot. It excels at ranged combat, as it can use the missile pods in its body to fire homing missiles.
Sparkman
A mecha inspired by Thomas Edison and primarily piloted by Teru. It constantly generates electricity, which it can use to augment the power of its weapon or attacks.
Gaudia
A mecha inspired by the Spartan army and primarily piloted by Ryugo. It is the physically strongest of the Megaton-Class Rogues, with its large body giving it both high offense and defense.
Musashi-O
A mecha based on a copy of the Musashi's blueprints, built in Solon by Victor. It was originally piloted by Masamune before he leaves to infiltrate Ixia, after which it is primarily piloted by Victor. It is equipped with a rear deifter vernier, giving it superior maneuverability compared to the Musashi.
Fire Loader
A mecha inspired by retro American cars with a fire paint job. Primarily piloted by Masamune. It is developed by Takumi based on the combat data from the Draktor mecha Balrog, and is customized for higher movement flexibility, attack variations, and heat resistance to accommodate Masamune's piloting style.
Brahms Soldier
A mecha with a medieval soldier motif. Equipped with extra propulsion engines and designed for increased cold resistance. Primarily piloted by Shizuka.
Mad Bison
A mecha with an post-apocalyptic wasteland vehicle motif. Designed for high offensive output in exchange for minimal defenses. In the game, one is assembled with parts salvaged by the townspeople of Solon. This particular one is nicknamed "Tetsuo-bot" and is primarily piloted by Tetsuo.
Dark Knight
A Draktor mecha piloted by Grieffas and several other Draktor officers. Equipped with a force field-generating mechanism to greatly reduce incoming damage. In the game, parts of an abandoned Dark Knight are salvaged by Victor and used to assemble a Megaton-Class Rogue that is primarily piloted by Arshem.

=== Pilots ===
Yamato Ichidaiji (一大寺 大和, Ichidaiji Yamato)
Voiced by: Toshiki Masuda
A hot-blooded boy with a short temper but a strong sense of justice. His family was killed during the Draktor invasion, which he has recently been experiencing flashbacks of, and he becomes Musashi's pilot to take revenge on the Draktors. However, after meeting Arshem, he begins to reconsider his attitude towards the Draktors.
Ryugo Hijikata (土方 龍吾, Hijikata Ryūgo)
Voiced by: Shunsuke Takeuchi
A delinquent who leads a gang that frequently gets into street fights, he is actually kind and compassionate to others, especially children and the elderly. Despite being a Seikoku Academy student, he forgoes the standard uniform in favor of an outfit reminiscent of Showa era biker gang members. Lives in a nursery called Sunflower Garden, of which his mother Minae is the director. Recruited at the same time as Yamato, he initially serves as a co-pilot of Musashi, and is later assigned his personal Rogue, the Gaudia. During one battle, an explosion in his compartment triggers his pre-invasion memories, revealing that he was mistreated by his biological mother, who would punish him by locking him in a closet for extended periods of time. He subsequently tries to leave the nursery to live alone, but Minae stops him, reassuring him that they can be like a real family despite them not being related by blood.
Teru Asami (浅海 輝, Asami Teru)
Voiced by: Soma Saito
A calm and collected boy who often acts as strategist and was romantically involved with his commander Sayaka Minami, who was Oblivion Bay's commander. He aims for coexistence between humanity and the Draktors. He is Sparkman's pilot, and briefly serves as a co-pilot of Musashi.
Reiji Amemiya (雨宮 零士, Amemiya Reiji)
Voiced by: Koki Uchiyama
A "transfer student" to Yamato's class, he is not particularly popular despite his good looks due to his unconventional personality. He lost his family to the Draktor invasion and was saved by Professor Simon Raider, who took him in as an adopted son. Over the next three years, he was housed in a research facility on Ixia where his psychic ability, dubbed the Psycho-Rise, was studied and developed. He is eventually allowed to join the Ixia population, where he finds that he prefers friendships with cats over humans. After the Musashi's first few battles, the Research Center deploys him as the Arthur's pilot.
Jun Kirishima (霧島 ジュン, Kirishima Jun)
Voiced by: Sumire Morohoshi
An energetic girl who is popular at school and gets along well with others. A key member of Seikoku Academy's gymnastics club, she is also secretly the boss of an anti-bullying street gang known as KJ, which consists mostly of her supporters during her brief time as an independent idol singer. She is Maximus's primary pilot, and briefly pilots a Robinson Diver-Class Rogue for training.
Momoka Saotome (早乙女 萌々香, Saotome Momoka)
Voiced by: Megumi Han
A girl whose family owns a dojo and who is skilled in martial arts. She is polite, caring, and willing to help those in need. Has a long-standing rivalry with Jun, which sees them often competing with each other. She is Maximus's co-pilot.
Kota Akutagawa (茶川 康太, Akutagawa Kōta)
Voiced by: Ayumu Murase
An eccentric loner notable for his afro hair, something about the way he emotes invites the scorn of others. It is later revealed that he is a service android created to be a bullying target, helping to keep actual humans from being bullied. After Momoka saves him from being dismantled by his manufacturers, he is recruited by Oblivion Bay to serve as a crew member. In the game, he can become a Megaton-Class Rogue pilot after taking a pilot aptitude test on Takumi's recommendation.
Takumi Kindaichi (金田一 巧, Kindaichi Takumi)
Voiced by: Yuki Kaji
A massive mecha otaku and a member of Seikoku Academy's technology club. He also runs a robotics workshop he calls Kindaichi Industries Inc. When he is caught sneaking into the Rogue hangar to observe the Maximus's assembly, Duke recognizes him as the son of Dr. Ryusei Haruma, designer of the Musashi. He is subsequently recruited by Oblivion Bay to serve as a mechanic. In the game, he can become a Megaton-Class Rogue pilot after taking a pilot aptitude test.
Ginta Ibushi (伊伏 銀太, Ibushi Ginta)
Voiced by: Kazuhiro Yamaji, Hazuki Ogino (Young)
An enthusiastic veteran Rogue pilot who would risk his life for his comrades, he leads the Ibushi Squadron, a support unit of Diver-Class Rogues. His civilian identity is a construction worker. He primarily pilots a Zero No. 6 Diver-Class Rogue, and briefly serves as Maximus's co-pilot before Momoka is recruited.
Victor Yeager (ヴィクト・イーガー, Vikuto Īgā) / Yugen Saotome (早乙女 勇元, Saotome Yūgen)
Voiced by: Yuichi Nakamura
A surface-dweller and de facto leader of Solon, he holds no grudge against the Draktors and is focused on helping the townspeople survive. Introduced happening upon Arshem after she was separated from Yamato during the attack on Ixia, he subsequently makes a deal to escort her to a crashed Draktor warship in exchange for resources. It is later revealed that he is Momoka's biological father, who was involved in the Shelters' construction project prior to the invasion. Despite having boarding privilege as a project staff, he gave his spot on Ixia to Momoka to ensure her safety. With Tetsuo's help, he built the Musashi-O based on a copy of the Musashi's blueprints, and becomes its primary pilot after Masamune leaves Solon to infiltrate Ixia.
Masamune Kuze (九世 正宗, Kuze Masamune)
Voiced by: Jun Fukuyama
A third-year delinquent student who supposedly controls Seikoku Academy from the shadows, known for crushing his enemies with peerless power and precision. Only Yamato, Reiji, and Jun seem to be unaware of his existence. After the trio confront him, it is revealed that he is a surface-dweller from Solon who has hacked the memory manipulation system to insert himself into the population. He later applies to be a Rogue pilot, and subsequently hijacks Ixia in an attempt to force the Shelter to house the Solon townspeople. His plan is ultimately thwarted by Reiji and Teru disguising themselves as Oblivion Bay crew members and immobilizing him with a taser. After hearing him out, however, Margaret agrees to help Solon anyway. He was the Musashi-O's original pilot back in Solon, and as a pilot on Ixia, he briefly operates the Musashi before the completion of his personal Rogue, the Fire Loader.
Shizuka Manami (万波 シズカ, Manami Shizuka)
Voiced by: Mana Kobayashi
A surface-dweller and comrade of Victor's, she is a generally stoic girl with a big appetite. She infiltrates Ixia along with Masamune, assisting him while staying hidden. During Masamune's hijacking attempt, she is caught by Yamato and Ryugo. After the Solon townspeople are evacuated into Ixia, she enters the population as a first-year Seikoku Academy student, and also becomes a Megaton-Class Rogue pilot after passing an aptitude test. She occasionally pilots the Sparkman when Teru is not available, and is later assigned her personal rogue, the Brahms Soldier.
Tetsuo Iwata (テツオ・イワタ, Tetsuo Iwata)
Voiced by: Kenta Miyake
A Rogue engineer in Solon, he is unrefined but has a good heart and respects Victor as a sworn brother. He helped Victor build the Musashi-O, and would often accompany him on scavenging trips. In the game, he assembles his own Rogue, a Mad Bison which he nicknames the "Tetsuo-bot," and earns his spot as a Megaton-Class Rogue pilot after proving his piloting skills in the Lost Village's Colosseum.

=== Draktor ===
Crouzade Laia (クロウゼード・ライア, Kurouzēdo Raia)
Voiced by: Miyuki Sawashiro
The queen of the Draktors and Arshem's mother.
Arshem Laia (アーシェム・ライア, Āshemu Raia)
Voiced by: Tomoyo Kurosawa
Crouzade Laia's daughter and princess of the Draktor, who seeks coexistence between her people and humanity. She briefly pilots the Musashi-O during her time in Solon, and in the game, she is an optional Megaton-Class Rogue pilot unlockable via a side quest.
Sarzant Evol (サーザント・エボル, Sāzanto Eboru)
Voiced by: Katsuyuki Konishi
A loyal knight who has served Arshem since her childhood.
Grieffas Kredo (グリファース・クレド, Gurifāsu Kuredo)
Voiced by: Takahiro Sakurai
Supreme commander of the Draktors. He pilots a Dark Knight (Vohda) Draktor mecha, which can transform into the Dark Knight Emperor (Zerk Vohda) using Mass Expander-like technology.

== Media ==
=== Video game ===
The project was originally announced on July 27, 2016, and set to begin in Q3 2017. Developed and published by Level-5 and directed by Akihiro Hino, the game released in Japan on November 11, 2021, for the Nintendo Switch and PlayStation 4. Following the game's release, it has received free updates with additional content. Paid downloadable content (DLC) was released throughout 2022.

As of March 2023, the game has included collaboration with various anime robot properties including Mazinger Z, UFO Robot Grendizer, Getter Robo, Combattler V, and Voltes V. On September 20, 2023, an English trailer was publicly released.

=== Anime ===
The anime television series for the franchise was announced along with the game. The series is produced by OLM and directed by both Akihiro Hino (serving as chief director) and Shigeharu Takahashi, with scripts also written by Hino, character designs by Takuzō Nagano, and music composed by Ken'ichirō Saigō. The series aired from October 1 to December 24, 2021, on Tokyo MX and BS Fuji. The opening theme song is "Musashi", performed by Nijiiro Samurai's Zuma, while the ending theme song is "Metsubou Sekai no Ballad" (滅亡世界のバラッド), performed by Mana.

The second season aired from October 7, 2022, to March 17, 2023. The opening theme song is "Song of Heroes" (英雄のうた, Eiyū no Uta), performed by Kodai Matsūra, while the ending theme song is "Mayoeru Hitsuji-tachi no Banka" (迷える羊たちの挽歌), again performed by Mana. Several episodes were delayed due to the COVID-19 pandemic, resulting in episodes 11 to 13 (episodes 24 to 26 overall) aired from February 3 to 17, 2023, with the remainder finale of episodes 14 and 15 (episodes 27 and 28 overall) aired thereafter on March 10 and 17 of the same year.

On April 25, 2024, Crunchyroll licensed the first season of the series for weekly streaming. Medialink licensed the series in East Asia (excluding China and Japan), Southeast Asia and Oceania (excluding Australia and New Zealand) and streamed it on Ani-One Asia's YouTube channel.

== Reception ==
In its first three days of release, the game sold 11,378 units, with 7,730 being sold on the Nintendo Switch and 3,648 on the PlayStation 4.
