= OLM (studio) =

Japanese animation studio

OLM, Inc.

- Headquarters in Setagaya, Tokyo
- Native name: 株式会社オー・エル・エム
- Romanized name: Kabushiki-gaisha Ō Eru Emu
- Formerly: Oriental Light and Magic, Inc. (1994–2006)
- Type: Subsidiary
- Industry: Anime; Live action
- Founded: June 1994; 32 years ago
- Founder: Toshiaki Okuno; Shūkichi Kanda
- Headquarters: Wakabayashi, Setagaya, Tokyo, Japan
- Area served: Worldwide
- Key people: Hideki Kama (CEO); Chikara Ōkubo (vice-president)
- Owner: Imagica Group
- Number of employees: OLM, Inc.: 204 (Note: As of March 2025); OLM Digital, Inc.: 138; OLM Asia SDN BHD: 66 (Note: As of March 2023); Viracocha Inc.: 7; Sprite Animation Studios: 4
- Subsidiaries: OLM Digital; OLM Music; OLM Ventures; Viracocha; Outside Japan: OLM Malaysia (in Cyberjaya, Malaysia); OLM Thailand (in Bangkok, Thailand); Sprite Animation Studios (in Los Angeles, California, U.S.)
- Website: olm.co.jp

OLM, Inc. (Note: Japanese: 株式会社オー・エル・エム, Hepburn: Kabushiki-gaisha Ō Eru Emu) (formerly Oriental Light and Magic, Inc. ) is a Japanese animation studio founded in June 1994 by former Studio Pastel producers Toshiaki Okuno and Shūkichi Kanda. Headquartered in Setagaya, Tokyo, Japan, they are best known for producing children's anime series such as Pokémon, Yo-kai Watch, and Beyblade Burst. They have also produced many series for older audiences, such as Berserk, Odd Taxi, and The Apothecary Diaries.

== History ==
OLM was founded as Oriental Light and Magic, Inc. in June 1994 by Toshiaki Okuno and Shūkichi Kanda, two employees of OB Planning and its subsidiary animation studio Pastel. Several frequent collaborators of Okuno and Kanda, such as Shōji Ōta, Kunihiko Yuyama, Naohito Takahashi, Yuriko Chiba, Nobuyuki Wasaki, Tsukasa Koitabashi, and Takaya Mizutani, joined the studio upon its establishment. Their name is derived from the American special effects studio Industrial Light & Magic.

In 1995, OLM representative director Toshiaki Okuno founded OLM Digital, which became the main CG work company behind a majority of OLM's works. OLM Digital would later provide CG services to live-action films, working closely with director Takashi Miike, who would eventually become the lead director of OLM's live-action productions.

In 2016, Imagica Group acquired a majority stake in the studio, making them a wholly-owned subsidiary.

In 2017, OLM established its first international satellite studio in Cyberjaya, Malaysia. In 2024, they would establish a second international studio in Bangkok, Thailand.

In February 2024, it was announced that Toshiaki Okuno had resigned from his position as representative director. Hideki Kama, the vice president of the company at the time, was declared his successor at the main studio, while Misako Saka would succeed him as the representative director of OLM Digital. These changes took place on April 1, 2024. Okuno remains with the company as part of the board of directors.

In April 2024, OLM opened its first domestic satellite studio near Hana-Koganei Station in Kodaira, Tokyo.

== Studio structure ==
OLM's production lines are typically distinctively branded as "Teams". They are typically named after the Animation Producer (Note: Team names often attributed to the Production Manager (制作担当) of the title until around 2014. Few titles before this time credited the team leaders as Animation Producers.) leading the production. As of 2026, the studio operates six separate production lines.

Current OLM Production Units
Team Name	Lead Producer	Notes
OLM TEAM YOSHIOKA	Daisuke Yoshioka (吉岡 大輔, Yoshioka Daisuke)	Established by a former TEAM WASAKI member.
OLM TEAM KUMEMURA	Makoto Kumemura (久米村 誠, Kumemura Makoto)	Reshuffled from TEAM KATO.
OLM TEAM HIKITA	Takahito Hikita (引田 崇人, Hikita Takahito)	Established by a former TEAM INOUE member.
OLM TEAM MASUDA	Katsuhito Masuda (増田 克人, Masuda Katsuhito)	Formerly a producer at MAPPA. Staff spun-off from TEAM SAKURAI.
—N/a	Eiji Sumitomo (住友 英司, Sumitomo Eiji)	Formerly a producer at Studio Gokumi. Staff spun-off from TEAM KOJIMA and TEAM INOUE.
—N/a	Satoshi Shōda (正田 聡史, Shōda Satoshi)	Established by a former TEAM ABE member.
—N/a	Takumi Kusakabe (草壁 匠, Kusakabe Takumi)	Formerly a producer at Sunrise Beyond. Staff based in the satellite studio near Hana-Koganei Station.
OLM TEAM MIIKE	Misako Saka (坂 美佐子, Saka Misako)	Division of OLM Digital. Produces live-action works under the direction of Takashi Miike.

Former OLM Production Units
Team Name	Lead Producer	Notes
OLM TEAM INOUE	Takashi Inoue (井上 たかし, Inoue Takashi)	Established by a former TEAM WASAKI member. Dissolved after Takashi Inoue moved to a new department at the beginning of 2026 and is no longer working as producer following the production of Scum of the Brave.
OLM TEAM KATO (Note: Hiroyuki Katō is currently a Production Supervisor. Titles with him as Production Supervisor have the team name OLM Division 1, except for Beyblade X.)	Hiroyuki Katō (加藤 浩幸, Katō Hiroyuki)	Established by a former TEAM KAMEI member. Reshuffled into TEAM KUMEMURA following the production of Pokémon Horizons: The Series episode 45. Hiroyuki Katō remains in the team as Creative Producer.
OLM TEAM KOITABASHI	Tsukasa Koitabashi (小板橋 司, Koitabashi Tsukasa)	Formerly of Gallop. One of the original production units. Last credited work was Pochitto Hatsumei: Pikachin-Kit. Due to inactivity since 2020, it is assumed this team has disbanded.
OLM TEAM WASAKI	Nobuyuki Wasaki (和崎 伸之, Wasaki Nobuyuki)	Formerly of Gallop. One of the original production units. Last credited work was Kamisama Minarai: Himitsu no Cocotama. Due to inactivity since 2018, it is assumed this team has disbanded.
OLM TEAM OTA	Shōji Ōta (太田 昌二, Ōta Shōji)	Formerly of OB Planning/Pastel. One of the original production units. Disbanded in 2008 following the production of Let's Go! Tamagotchi. Currently production desk for Hanakappa.
OLM TEAM IGUCHI	Noriaki Iguchi (井口 憲明, Iguchi Noriaki)	One of the original production units. Disbanded in 2010 following the production of Episode 2 of Pokémon: Diamond and Pearl: Sinnoh League Victors.
OLM TEAM IWASA	Gaku Iwasa (岩佐 岳, Iwasa Gaku)	Disbanded and spun off in 2007, establishing the studio White Fox following the production of Utawarerumono.
OLM TEAM KOJIMA	Hiroaki Kojima (児島 宏明, Kojima Hiroaki)	Formerly a producer at Diomedéa; Disbanded and spun off in 2022, establishing the studio Bug Films following the production of Summer Time Rendering.
OLM TEAM ABE	Isamu Abe (阿部 勇, Abe Isamu)	Formerly a producer at SynergySP. Disbanded in 2022 following the production of Shinkansen Henkei Robo Shinkalion Z. Currently affiliated with KONAMI Animation as of 2024.
OLM TEAM SAKURAI (Note: Written as TEAM 櫻 until Episode 12 of PriPri Chi-chan!!)	Ryōsuke Sakurai (櫻井 涼介, Sakurai Ryōsuke)	Formerly a producer at SynergySP. Disbanded in 2019 following the production of Zoids Wild. Remained as Associate Animation Producer for Beyblade Burst Surge up until episode 26. Currently affiliated with East Fish Studio as of 2024.
OLM TEAM KAMEI	Yasuteru Kamei (亀井 康輝, Kamei Yasuteru)	Established by a former TEAM KOITABASHI member. Disbanded in 2017 following the production of 100% Pascal-sensei.
OLM TEAM GO	Gō Sawada (澤田 剛, Sawada Gō)	Established by a former TEAM KOITABASHI member. Merged into TEAM INOUE following the production of Cardfight!! Vanguard: Shinemon-hen. Remained as a production manager for TEAM INOUE.
OLM TEAM KAWAKITA	Manabu Kawakita (河北 学 (Kawakita Manabu)	Established by a former TEAM INOUE member. Partially merged back into TEAM INOUE following the production of Inazuma Eleven: Orion no Kokuin. Remained as a production manager until 2022 when he transferred to AQUASTAR Inc.
OLM TEAM MIYAGAWA	Keisuke Miyagawa (三宅川 敬輔, Miyagawa Keisuke)	Former live-action production unit. Disbanded in 2015 and absorbed into Fuji Creative Corporation (FCC).

== Works ==
=== TV series ===
Title	First run start date	First run end date	Episodes	Notes	Team	Ref.
Wedding Peach	April 5, 1995	March 27, 1996	51	Adaptation of the manga series by Nao Yazawa and Sukehiro Tomita. Although the series' credits list KSS for animation production, the animation was done by OLM and is listed as such on their website.	Team Ota	
Mojacko	October 3, 1995	March 31, 1997	74	Adaptation of the manga series created by author duo Fujiko F. Fujio.	Team Iguchi	
Pokémon	April 1, 1997	Present	1,300	A long-running Japanese children's anime TV series. Adapted from The Pokémon Company's media franchise of the same name.	Team Ota (1997–2006); Team Iguchi (2006–2009); Team Kato (2010–2024); Team Kumemura (2024-present)	
Berserk	October 7, 1997	March 31, 1998	25	Adaptation of the manga series by Kentaro Miura.	Team Iguchi	
Adventures of Mini-Goddess	April 6, 1998	March 29, 1999	48	Based on the Oh My Goddess! manga series by Kōsuke Fujishima.	Team Koitabashi	
To Heart	April 1, 1999	June 24, 1999	13	Adaptation of adult visual novel developed by Leaf.	Team Wasaki	
Steel Angel Kurumi	October 5, 1999	April 4, 2000	24	Based on a manga series by Kaishaku.	Team Wasaki	
Comic Party	April 2, 2001	June 25, 2001	13+4 specials	Based on the romantic adventure and dating sim video game by Leaf.	Team Iguchi	
Steel Angel Kurumi 2	April 12, 2001	June 28, 2001	12	An alternate story of the Steel Angel Kurumi anime series.	Team Wasaki	
Figure 17	May 27, 2001	June 26, 2002	13	An anime television series created by Genco and OLM, Inc.	Team Wasaki	
Kasumin	October 13, 2001	October 1, 2003	78	Original work.	Team Iwasa	
Piano: The Melody of a Young Girl's Heart	November 11, 2002	January 13, 2003	10	An anime television series directed by Norihiko Sudo.	Team Iguchi	
Croket!	April 7, 2003	March 27, 2005	78	Adaptation of the manga by Manavu Kashimoto.	Team Iguchi	
Godannar	October 1, 2003	June 29, 2004	26	An anime series by Yasuchika Nagaoka. Co-produced with AIC A.S.T.A.		
Full-Blast Science Adventure – So That's How It Is	October 5, 2003	March 28, 2004	26	An anime television series directed by Norihiko Sudo.	Team Iwasa	
Monkey Turn	January 10, 2004	June 26, 2004	25	Adaptation of the manga by Katsutoshi Kawai.		
Monkey Turn V	July 3, 2004	December 18, 2004	25	Sequel to Monkey Turn.		
Agatha Christie's Great Detectives Poirot and Marple	July 4, 2004	May 15, 2005	39	Adaptation of several Agatha Christie stories about Hercule Poirot and Miss Marple.	Team Iwasa	
To Heart: Remember My Memories	October 2, 2004	December 25, 2004	13	Sequel to To Heart. Co-produced with AIC ASTA.		
Guyver: The Bioboosted Armor	August 6, 2005	February 18, 2006	26	Based on the long-running manga series, Bio Booster Armor Guyver, by Yoshiki Takaya.	Team Wasaki	
To Heart 2	October 3, 2005	January 2, 2006	13	Based on Japanese romance visual novel developed by Leaf and published by Aquaplus. Stylized as ToHeart2.	Team Iguchi	
Utawarerumono	April 3, 2006	September 25, 2006	26	Based on the adult tactical role-playing visual novel by Leaf.	Team Iwasa	
Makai Senki Disgaea	April 4, 2006	June 20, 2006	12	Based on the video game Disgaea: Hour of Darkness.	Team Iguchi	
Ray the Animation	April 6, 2006	June 29, 2006	13	Based on a manga series by Akihito Yoshitomi.	Team Iguchi	
Pokémon Chronicles	June 3, 2006	November 25, 2006	22	The side story of Pokémon anime television series.		
Silk Road Kids Yuto	September 16, 2006	March 24, 2007	26	Original 3DCG series.	OLM Digital	
Super Robot Wars Original Generation: Divine Wars	October 4, 2006	March 29, 2007	25+OVA	Retells the events from the Super Robot Taisen: Original Generation game.	Team Iwasa	
Gift: Eternal Rainbow	October 6, 2006	December 22, 2006	12+OVA	Based on the adult visual novel developed by Moonstone.	Team Iwasa	
Deltora Quest	January 6, 2007	March 29, 2008	65	Based on the Deltora Quest children's books series by Australian author Emily Rodda.	Team Wasaki	
Inazuma Eleven	October 5, 2008	April 27, 2011	127	Adaptation of the manga series by Tenya Yabuno. Based on the video game series created by Level-5.	Team Wasaki	
Usaru-san	October 3, 2009	October 10, 2009	4		Team Koitabashi	
Tamagotchi!	October 12, 2009	September 3, 2012	143	Based on the Tamagotchi digital pet jointly created by Bandai and WiZ.	Team Kamei	
Hanakappa	March 29, 2010 (Note: OLM took over animation production in September 2010 after the original animation studio, Group TAC, went bankrupt.)	Present	708	Adaptation of the picture book series by Tadashi Akiyama. Co-produced with Xebec from September 2010 to January 2019, then co-produced with Signal.MD from April 2019 to 2021.		
Little Battlers Experience	March 2, 2011	January 11, 2012	44	Based on a manga series by Hideaki Fujii.	Team Inoue	
Inazuma Eleven GO	May 4, 2011	March 19, 2014	141	Known as Inazuma Eleven GO: Chrono Stone for season 2 and Inazuma Eleven GO: Galaxy for third & final season.; Adaptation of the manga series by Tenya Yabuno; Based on the video game series created by Level-5	Team Wasaki (seasons 1–2); Team Koitabashi (season 3)	
Little Battlers Experience W	January 18, 2012	March 20, 2013	58	Sequel to Little Battlers Experience.	Team Inoue	
Tamagotchi! Yume Kira Dream	September 10, 2012	August 29, 2013	49	Sequel to Tamagotchi!.	Team Kamei	
Little Battlers Experience Wars	April 3, 2013	December 25, 2013	37	Sequel to Little Battlers Experience W.	Team Inoue	
Pac-Man and the Ghostly Adventures	June 15, 2013	April 25, 2015	52	Original 3DCG series based on the video game series created by Bandai Namco Entertainment. Co-produced with 41 Entertainment, Arad Productions and Sprite Animation Studios.	OLM Digital	
Tamagotchi! Miracle Friends	September 5, 2013	March 27, 2014	29	Sequel to Tamagotchi! Yume Kira Dream.	Team Wasaki	
Future Card Buddyfight	January 4, 2014	April 4, 2015	64	Based on the collectible card game created by Bushiroad. Co-produced with Xebec.		
Yo-kai Watch	January 8, 2014	March 30, 2018	214	Based on the role-playing video games by Level-5.	Team Inoue	
GO-GO Tamagotchi!	April 3, 2014	March 26, 2015	50	Sequel to Tamagotchi! Miracle Friends.	Team Wasaki	
Dragon Collection	April 7, 2014	March 23, 2015	51	Adaptation of the manga series by Muneyuki Kaneshiro based on the social network and trading card arcade games by Konami.		
Monster Retsuden Oreca Battle	April 7, 2014	March 30, 2015	51	Adaptation of the manga by Satoshi Yamaura based on the trading card arcade game by Konami. Co-produced with Xebec.		
Omakase! Miracle Cat-dan	March 31, 2015	February 23, 2016	32	Based on Neko no Ashiato, an autobiographical essay book by Shoko Nakagawa.		
Future Card Buddyfight 100	April 11, 2015	March 26, 2016	50	Sequel to Future Card Buddyfight. Co-produced with Xebec.		
Pikaia!	April 29, 2015	August 30, 2015	13	Co-produced with Production I.G.		
Kamisama Minarai: Himitsu no Cocotama	October 1, 2015	August 30, 2018	139	Based on the Cocotama House Series toys Created by Bandai.	Team Wasaki (Season 1); Team Yoshioka (Season 2)	
Future Card Buddyfight Triple D	April 1, 2016	March 24, 2017	51	Sequel to Future Card Buddyfight 100. Co-produced with Xebec.		
Age 12: A Little Heart-Pounding	April 4, 2016	December 19, 2016	24	Adaptation of the manga series by Nao Maita.	Team Sakurai	
Beyblade Burst	April 4, 2016	March 27, 2017	51	Adaptation of the manga by Hiro Morita.	Team Abe	
Cardfight!! Vanguard G NEXT	October 2, 2016	October 1, 2017	52	Based on the trading card game created by Bushiroad. Sequel to Cardfight!! Vanguard G Stride Gate. Co-produced with Xebec.	Team Koitabashi	
Pikaia!!	February 26, 2017	May 27, 2017	13	Sequel to Pikaia! Co-produced with Production I.G		
Future Card Buddyfight X	April 1, 2017	March 31, 2018	52	Sequel to Future Card Buddyfight Triple D. Co-produced with Xebec.		
Beyblade Burst Evolution	April 3, 2017	March 26, 2018	51	Adaptation of the manga by Hiro Morita and sequel to Beyblade Burst.	Team Abe	
Snack World	April 13, 2017	April 19, 2018	50	3DCG adaptation of the video game by Level 5.	OLM Digital	
100% Pascal-sensei	April 15, 2017	December 16, 2017	36	Adaptation of the manga by Yūji Nagai.	Team Kamei	
PriPri Chi-chan!!	April 15, 2017	December 16, 2017	36	Adaptation of the manga by Hiromu Shinozuka.	Team Sakurai	
Atom: The Beginning	April 15, 2017	July 8, 2017	12	Adaptation of the manga by Tetsuro Kasahara along with Makoto Tezuka and Masami Yuki. Co-produced with Production I.G and Signal.MD.	Team Koitabashi	
Tomica Hyper Rescue Drive Head Kidō Kyūkyū Keisatsu	April 15, 2017	December 23, 2017	37	Based on the Tomica toyline created by Tomy. Co-produced with Xebec.		
Cardfight!! Vanguard G: Z	October 8, 2017	April 1, 2018	24	Based on the trading card game created by Bushiroad. Sequel to Cardfight!! Vanguard G NEXT. Co-produced with Bridge.	Team Koitabashi	
Shinkansen Henkei Robo Shinkalion The Animation	January 6, 2018	June 29, 2019	76	Based on the toyline created by Tomy.		
Pochitto Hatsumei: Pikachin-Kit	January 6, 2018	March 28, 2020	115	Co-produced with Shin-Ei Animation.	Team Koitabashi	
Beyblade Burst Turbo	April 2, 2018	March 25, 2019	51	Adaptation of the manga by Hiro Morita and sequel to Beyblade Burst Evolution.	Team Abe	
Inazuma Eleven: Ares	April 6, 2018	September 28, 2018	26	Alternate sequel to the special Inazuma Eleven: Reloaded; Based on the video game series by Level-5.	Team Kawakita	
Future Card Buddyfight X All Star Fight	April 7, 2018	May 26, 2018	8	Sequel to Future Card Buddyfight X. Co-produced with Xebec.		
Major 2nd	April 7, 2018	November 7, 2020	50	Sequel to Major.	Team Kojima	
Yo-kai Watch Shadowside	April 13, 2018	March 29, 2019	49	Based on the role-playing video games by Level-5.	Team Inoue	
Cardfight!! Vanguard (2018)	May 5, 2018	May 4, 2019	52	Based on the trading card game created by Bushiroad. Reboot of the original series. Co-produced with Bridge.	Team Go	
Future Card Buddyfight Ace	June 2, 2018	March 30, 2019	43	Sequel to Future Card Buddyfight X: All Star Fight. Co-produced with Xebec.		
Zoids Wild	July 7, 2018	June 29, 2019	50	Based on the Zoids toyline.	Team Sakurai	
Kira Kira Happy Hirake! Cocotama	September 6, 2018	September 26, 2019	55	Sequel to Kamisama Minarai: Himitsu no Cocotama.	Team Yoshioka	
Inazuma Eleven: Orion no Kokuin	October 5, 2018	September 27, 2019	49	Sequel to Inazuma Eleven: Ares.	Team Kawakita	
Tinpo	December 10, 2018	November 6, 2019	78	Original 3DCG series based on the characters created by Those Characters from Cleveland, Inc. Co-produced with Cloudco Entertainment, CBeebies, Sprite Animation Studios and Dentsu.	OLM Digital	
Yo-kai Watch!	April 5, 2019	December 20, 2019	36	Revival of the original series. Co-produced with Magic Bus.	Team Inoue	
Kedama no Gonjirō	April 6, 2019	March 28, 2020	52	Co-produced with Wit Studio.		
Mix Meisei Story	April 6, 2019	September 28, 2019	24	Adaptation of the manga by Mitsuru Adachi.	Team Kojima	
Cardfight!! Vanguard: High School Arc Cont.	May 11, 2019	August 10, 2019	14	Based on the trading card game created by Bushiroad. Sequel to Cardfight!! Vanguard (2018).	Team Go	
Cardfight!! Vanguard: Shinemon-hen	August 24, 2019	March 28, 2020	31	Based on the trading card game created by Bushiroad. Prequel to Cardfight!! Vanguard (2018).	Team Go Team Abe (episodes 21-31)	
Zoids Wild Zero	October 4, 2019	October 16, 2020	50	Prequel to Zoids Wild.	Team Masuda	
Yo-kai Watch Jam: Yo-kai Academy Y: Encounter with N	December 27, 2019	April 2, 2021	64	Based on the role-playing video games by Level-5.	Team Inoue	
Bungo and Alchemist: Gears of Judgement	April 3, 2020	August 7, 2020	13	Based on the video game created by DMM Games.	Team Kojima	
Tomica Bond Combination Earth Granner	April 5, 2020	March 28, 2021	51	Based on the Tomica toy line created by Tomy.	Team Inoue	
GaruGaku: Saint Girls Square Academy	April 6, 2020	March 29, 2021	50	Co-produced with Wit Studio.	Team Kato	
Cardfight!! Vanguard Gaiden if	May 30, 2020	November 30, 2020	25	Based on the trading card game created by Bushiroad. Alternate Universe to Cardfight!! Vanguard (2018).	Team Abe	
King's Raid: Successors of the Will	October 3, 2020	March 27, 2021	26	Based on the South Korean video game created by Vespa. Co-produced with Sunrise Beyond.		
Mazica Party	April 4, 2021	March 27, 2022	51	Based on the trading card game created by Tomy.	Team Inoue	
Odd Taxi	April 6, 2021	June 29, 2021	13	Original work. Co-produced with P.I.C.S.	Team Yoshioka	
Shinkansen Henkei Robo Shinkalion Z	April 9, 2021	March 18, 2022	41	Sequel to Shinkansen Henkei Robo Shinkalion.	Team Abe	
Yo-kai Watch Music Note	April 9, 2021	March 31, 2023	98	Revival of the original series.	Team Inoue	
Megaton Musashi	October 1, 2021	December 24, 2021	13	Based on the video game created by Level-5.	Team Inoue	
Restaurant to Another World 2	October 2, 2021	December 18, 2021	12	Sequel to Restaurant to Another World.	Team Yoshioka	
Komi Can't Communicate	October 7, 2021	December 23, 2021	12	Adaptation of the manga series by Tomohito Oda.	Team Kojima	
Ninjala	January 8, 2022	Present	TBA	Based on the video game created by GungHo Online Entertainment.	Team Inoue (2022-2024); Team Hikita (2024-present)	
GaruGaku II: Lucky Stars	January 10, 2022	March 18, 2022	50	Sequel to GaruGaku: Saint Girls Square Academy.	Team Kato	
Life with an Ordinary Guy Who Reincarnated into a Total Fantasy Knockout	January 12, 2022	March 30, 2022	12	Adaptation of the manga series written by Yū Tsurusaki.	Team Yoshioka	
Love All Play	April 2, 2022	September 24, 2022	24	Adaptation of the novel written by Asami Koseki. Co-produced with Nippon Animation.	Team Yoshioka	
Komi Can't Communicate 2	April 7, 2022	June 23, 2022	12	Sequel to Komi Can't Communicate.	Team Kojima	
Summer Time Rendering	April 15, 2022	September 30, 2022	25	Adaptation of the manga series written by Yasuki Tanaka.	Team Kojima	
Punirunes	October 2, 2022	March 26, 2023	25	Based on the toy line created by Takara Tomy.	OLM Digital	
Megaton Musashi 2	October 7, 2022	March 17, 2023	15	Sequel to Megaton Musashi.	Team Inoue	
Don't Toy with Me, Miss Nagatoro 2nd Attack	January 8, 2023	March 26, 2023	12	Sequel to Don't Toy with Me, Miss Nagatoro by Telecom Animation Film.	Team Inoue	
Mix Meisei Story Season 2	April 1, 2023	September 23, 2023	24	Sequel to Mix Meisei Story.	Team Masuda	
Bōken Tairiku Ania Kingdom	April 2, 2023	December 24, 2023	39	Stop-motion series. Based on the toy lines created by Takara Tomy. Co-produced with Infinity Vision.		
Go! Go! Vehicle Zoo	April 2, 2023	December 24, 2023	26	Based on the toy lines created by Takara Tomy. Co-produced with Signal.MD.		
The Most Heretical Last Boss Queen	July 7, 2023	September 22, 2023	12	Adaptation of the light novel series written by Tenichi.	Team Yoshioka	
Dark Gathering	July 10, 2023	December 25, 2023	25	Adaptation of the manga series written by Kenichi Kondō.	Team Masuda	
Beyblade X	October 6, 2023	Present	TBA	Adaptation of the manga by Hikaru Muno, Homura Kawamoto and Posuka Demizu.	Team Masuda	
The Faraway Paladin: The Lord of Rust Mountain	October 7, 2023	December 23, 2023	12	Sequel to The Faraway Paladin by Children's Playground Entertainment. Co-produced with Sunrise Beyond.		
The Apothecary Diaries	October 22, 2023	March 24, 2024	24	Adaptation of the light novel series written by Hyūganatsu. Co-produced with Toho Animation Studio.		
Pon no Michi	January 6, 2024	March 23, 2024	12	Original work.	Team Inoue	
Sai-Kyo-Oh! Zukan: The Ultimate Battles	January 6, 2024	December 14, 2024	50	Adaptation of the children's book series published by Gakken.	OLM Digital	
Delusional Monthly Magazine	January 11, 2024	March 28, 2024	12	Original work.	Team Yoshioka	
Tonbo!	April 6, 2024	January 4, 2025	26	Adaptation of the manga series by Ken Kawasaki and Yū Furusawa. Co-produced with SMDE.	Division 2 (Note: Takahito Hikita is the animation producer, with Takashi Inoue as the production supervisor.)	
Himitsu no AiPri	April 7, 2024	March 29, 2026	102	Fifth entry in the Pretty series. Co-produced with Dongwoo A&E.	Division 2 (Season 2) (Note: Satoshi Shōda and Seung-Won Nam are the animation producers, with Takashi Inoue as the production supervisor.)	
I Parry Everything: What Do You Mean I'm the Strongest? I'm Not Even an Adventurer Yet!	July 5, 2024	September 20, 2024	12	Adaptation of the light novel series written by Nabeshiki.		
Dungeon People	July 6, 2024	September 28, 2024	12	Adaptation of the manga series by Sui Futami.	Team Yoshioka	
Punirunes Puni 2	October 6, 2024	March 30, 2025	25	Sequel to Punirunes.	OLM Digital	
Tono to Inu	October 10, 2024	March 28, 2025	24	Adaptation of the manga series by Rie Nishida. Co-produced with Live2D Creative Studio.		
The Apothecary Diaries Season 2	January 10, 2025	July 4, 2025	24	Sequel to The Apothecary Diaries. Co-produced with Toho Animation Studio.		
Go! Go! Vehicle Zoo: Norimono Star-hen	April 6, 2025	June 29, 2025	13	Sequel to Go! Go! Vehicle Zoo ONA. Co-produced with Lesprit.		
Sai-Kyo-Oh! Zukan: The Ultimate Tournament	April 6, 2025	March 29, 2026	50	Sequel to Sai-Kyo-Oh! Zukan: The Ultimate Battles.	OLM Digital	
Me and the Alien MuMu	April 10, 2025	September 18, 2025	24	Adaptation of the manga series by Hiroki Miyashita.	Division 2 (Note: Takashi Inoue is the production supervisor.)	
Welcome to the Outcast's Restaurant!	July 3, 2025	September 18, 2025	12	Adaptation of the light novel series written by Yūki Kimikawa.	Team Yoshioka	
Punirunes Puni 3	July 5, 2025	December 27, 2025	26	Sequel to Punirunes Puni 2.	OLM Digital	
Night of the Living Cat	July 7, 2025	September 22, 2025	12	Adaptation of the manga series by Hawkman and Mecha-Roots.	Division 1 (Note: Katsuhito Masuda and Daisuke Yoshioka are the animation producers, with Hiroyuki Katō as the production supervisor.)	
Let's Play	October 2, 2025	December 18, 2025	12	Adaptation of the webcomic by Leeanne M. Krecic.	Division 1	
Scum of the Brave	January 11, 2026	June 28, 2026	24	Adaptation of the light novel series written by Rocket Shokai.	Team Hikita	
Ace of Diamond Act II Season 2	April 5, 2026	TBA	TBA	Sequel to Ace of Diamond Act II by Madhouse.	Team Yoshioka	
Onegai AiPri	April 5, 2026	TBA	TBA	Successor to Himitsu no AiPri. Co-produced with Dongwoo A&E.	Division 1 (Note: Satoshi Shōda is the animation producer, with Hiroyuki Katō as the production supervisor.)	
The Most Heretical Last Boss Queen Season 2	April 7, 2026	June 23, 2026	12	Sequel to The Most Heretical Last Boss Queen.	Team Yoshioka	
The Cat and the Dragon	July 4, 2026	TBA	TBA	Adaptation of the light novel series written by Amara.	Division 3 (Note: Takumi Kusakabe is the animation producer.)	
The Apothecary Diaries Season 3	October 2, 2026	TBA	TBA	Sequel to The Apothecary Diaries Season 2.	Division 2 (Note: Eiji Sumitomo is the animation producer and Daisuke Yoshioka is the production supervisor.)	
Punirunes Puni 4	October 4, 2026	TBA	TBA	Sequel to Punirunes Puni 3.	OLM Digital	
Dark Gathering Season 2	2027	TBA	TBA	Sequel to Dark Gathering.	TBA	

=== Films ===
Title	Release date	Note(s)	Team	Ref.
Pokémon: The First Movie	July 18, 1998	The first animated film and the first film overall of the Pokémon franchise.	Team Koitabashi	
Pokémon: The Movie 2000	July 17, 1999	The second animated film of the Pokémon franchise.	Team Koitabashi	
Pokémon 3: The Movie	July 8, 2000	The third animated film of the Pokémon franchise.	Team Koitabashi	
Pokémon 4Ever	July 7, 2001	The fourth animated film of the Pokémon franchise.	Team Koitabashi	
Pokémon Heroes: Latias and Latios	July 13, 2002	The fifth animated film of the Pokémon franchise.	Team Koitabashi	
Pokémon: Jirachi Wish Maker	July 19, 2003	The sixth animated film of the Pokémon franchise.	Team Koitabashi	
Pokémon: Destiny Deoxys	July 17, 2004	The seventh animated film of the Pokémon franchise.	Team Koitabashi	
Blade of the Phantom Master	December 4, 2004	Adaptation of the manga-manhwa series by Youn In-wan and Yang Kyung-il. Co-produced with Character Plan.	Team Koitabashi	
Pokémon: Lucario and the Mystery of Mew	July 16, 2005	The eighth animated film of the Pokémon franchise.	Team Koitabashi	
Pokémon Ranger and the Temple of the Sea	July 15, 2006	The ninth animated film of the Pokémon franchise.	Team Koitabashi	
Gekijōban Dōbutsu no Mori	December 16, 2006	Based on the Animal Crossing video game series.	Team Kamei	
Pokémon: The Rise of Darkrai	July 14, 2007	The tenth animated film of the Pokémon franchise.	Team Koitabashi	
Tamagotchi: The Movie	December 15, 2007	The first Tamagotchi feature film.	Team Kamei	
Pokémon: Giratina and the Sky Warrior	July 19, 2008	The 11th animated film of the Pokémon franchise.	Team Koitabashi	
Tamagotchi: Happiest Story in the Universe!	December 20, 2008	The second Tamagotchi feature film.	Team Kamei	
Pokémon: Arceus and the Jewel of Life	July 18, 2009	The 12th animated film of the Pokémon franchise.	Team Koitabashi	
Professor Layton and the Eternal Diva	December 19, 2009	Based on the Professor Layton video game series by Level-5. Co-produced with P.A. Works.	Team Kamei	
Pokémon: Zoroark: Master of Illusions	July 10, 2010	The 13th animated film of the Pokémon franchise.	Team Koitabashi	
Inazuma Eleven: Saikyō Gundan Ōga Shūrai	December 23, 2010	Based on the manga and anime series Inazuma Eleven.	Team Koitabashi	
Pokémon the Movie: Black—Victini and Reshiram and White—Victini and Zekrom	July 16, 2011	The 14th animated film of the Pokémon franchise. Co-produced with Production I.G and Xebec.	Team Koitabashi	
Inazuma Eleven GO: Kyūkyoku no Kizuna Gurifon	December 23, 2011	Based on the manga and anime series Inazuma Eleven GO.	Team Koitabashi	
Pokémon the Movie: Kyurem vs. the Sword of Justice	July 14, 2012	The 15th animated film of the Pokémon franchise.	Team Koitabashi	
Inazuma Eleven GO vs. Danbōru Senki W	December 1, 2012	The crossover anime film of Inazuma Eleven GO and Little Battlers Experience W.	Team Koitabashi; Team Inoue	
Eiga Hana Kappa Hana-sake! Pakkaan Chō no Kuni no Daibōken	April 12, 2013	Co-produced with Xebec.		
Pokémon the Movie: Genesect and the Legend Awakened	July 13, 2013	The 16th animated film of the Pokémon franchise.	Team Koitabashi	
Pokémon Origins	October 2, 2013	TV film, co-produced with Production I.G and Xebec.		
Pokémon the Movie: Diancie and the Cocoon of Destruction	July 19, 2014	The 17th animated film of the Pokémon franchise.	Team Kamei	
Yo-kai Watch: The Movie	December 20, 2014	The first film of the Yo-Kai Watch franchise.	Team Inoue	
Pokémon the Movie: Hoopa and the Clash of Ages	July 18, 2015	The 18th animated film of the Pokémon franchise.	Team Kamei	
Yo-kai Watch The Movie 2: King Enma and the 5 Stories, Nyan!	December 19, 2015	The 2nd film of the Yo-kai Watch franchise.	Team Koitabashi; Team Inoue	
Pokémon the Movie: Volcanion and the Mechanical Marvel	July 16, 2016	The 19th animated film of the Pokémon franchise.	Team Kamei	
Rudolf the Black Cat	August 6, 2016	Based on the children's novel. Co-produced with Sprite Animation Studios.	OLM Digital	
Cyborg 009: Call of Justice	November 25, 2016	Based on the manga by Shotaro Ishinomori. Co-produced with Signal.MD.	OLM Digital	
Yo-kai Watch The Movie 3: Soratobu Kujira to Double no Sekai no Daibōken da Nyan!	December 17, 2016	Third film of the Yo-kai Watch franchise. Live-action/animated.	Team Inoue	
Eiga Kamisama Minarai: Himitsu no Cocotama: Kiseki o Okose ♪ Tepuru to Doki Doki Cocotama Kai	April 28, 2017	First anime film of Kamisama Minarai: Himitsu no Cocotama.	Team Yoshioka	
Pokémon the Movie: I Choose You!	July 15, 2017	The 20th animated film of the Pokémon franchise. Remake of the 1997 TV anime episode, "Pokémon, I Choose You!".	Team Kato	
Yo-kai Watch Shadowside: Oni-ō no Fukkatsu	December 16, 2017	The 4th film of the Yo-kai Watch franchise.	Team Inoue	
Laplace's Witch	May 4, 2018	Based on the novel by Keigo Higashino.	Team Miike	
Pokémon the Movie: The Power of Us	July 13, 2018	The 21st animated film of the Pokemon franchise. Co-produced with Wit Studio.	Team Kato	
Eiga Drive Head: Tomica Hyper Rescue Kidō Kyūkyū Keisatsu	August 24, 2018	The 1st film of the Tomica Hyper Rescue franchise.		
Yo-kai Watch: Forever Friends	December 14, 2018	The 5th film of the Yo-kai Watch franchise.	Team Inoue	
Pokémon: Mewtwo Strikes Back—Evolution	July 12, 2019	The 22nd animated film of the Pokemon franchise. The CGI remake of Pokémon: The First Movie, also known as Mewtwo Strikes Back. Co-produced with Sprite Animation Studios.	OLM Digital	
NiNoKuni	August 23, 2019	Based on the Ni no Kuni video game series by Level-5.	Team Kato	
Yo-kai Watch Jam: Yo-kai Academy Y: Can a Cat Become A Hero?	December 13, 2019	The 6th film of the Yo-kai Watch franchise.	Team Inoue	
Shinkansen Henkei Robo Shinkalion the Movie: Mirai Kara Kita Shinsoku no ALFA-X	December 27, 2019	The 1st film of the Shinkalion franchise.		
Pokémon the Movie: Secrets of the Jungle	December 25, 2020	The 23rd animated film of the Pokemon franchise.	Team Kato	
Yo-kai Watch the Movie: How Nate and I Met, Nyan!	November 17, 2021	The 7th film of the Yo-kai Watch franchise.	Team Inoue	
Catwoman: Hunted	February 8, 2022	Direct-to-video film based on Catwoman.	Team Inoue	
Odd Taxi: In the Woods	April 1, 2022	Based on the Odd Taxi anime series. Co-produced with P.I.C.S.	Team Yoshioka	
Yo-kai Watch the Movie: Jibanyan vs. Komasan - The Big Amazing Battle, Nyan!	January 13, 2023	The 8th film of the Yo-kai Watch franchise.	Team Inoue	
Eiga Inazuma Eleven Sōshūhen: Densetsu no Kickoff	December 27, 2024	Compilation film focusing on the matches in the Football Frontier arc of Inazuma Eleven.		
Sai-Kyo-Oh! Zukan: The Ultimate Tournament Tokubetsu-hen Teppen Kimeyō ka!	January 23, 2026	Compilation film for Sai-Kyo-Oh! Zukan: The Ultimate Tournament.	OLM Digital	
Eiga Himitsu no AiPri Mankai Buzzlume Live!	March 13, 2026	First anime film of Himitsu no AiPri.		

=== Original video/net animations ===
Title	Release start date	Release end date	Episodes	Notes	Team	Ref.
Makeruna! Makendō	March 25, 1995	March 25, 1995	1	Based on the game developed by Affect.	Team Ota	
Kōryū no Mimi: Mina no Shō	April 26, 1995	June 1, 1995	2	Adaptation of the novel series by Arimasa Osawa.		
Gunsmith Cats	November 1, 1995	September 1, 1996	3	Adaptation of the seinen manga series by Kenichi Sonoda.	Team Koitabashi	
Stainless Night	December 22, 1995	March 22, 1996	2	Adaptation of the manga series by Kei Amagi. Produced by Pink Pineapple.	Team Ota	
Power Dolls	March 20, 1996	March 1, 1998	2	Only animated the second episode of the series.	Team Koitabashi	
Wedding Peach DX	December 24, 1996	July 25, 1997	4	Sequel to the Wedding Peach anime series.	Team Ota	
Countdown: Akira	March 28, 1997	August 29, 1997	3	Adaptation of the manga series by Hiroyuki Utatane. Produced by Pink Pineapple.	Team Koitabashi	
I Dream of Mimi	April 25, 1997	September 26, 1997	3	Adaptation of the seinen manga series by Kaoru Shintani. Produced by Pink Pineapple.	Team Wasaki	
Game Tengoku: The Game Paradise!	June 6, 1997	June 6, 1997	1	Based on the game of the same name. Bundled with the limited edition of the Sega Saturn release.	Team Koitabashi	
Be-yond	February 27, 1998	May 29, 1998	2	Adaptation of the adult game by Silky's.	Team Iguchi	
Queen Emeraldas	June 10, 1998	December 18, 1999	4	An anime OVA that continues the Harlock franchise created by Leiji Matsumoto. OLM animated only the first two episodes of the series.	Team Wasaki	
Pokémon Pikachu's Winter Vacation	December 22, 1998	December 22, 1998	2	Short stories featuring Pikachu in the winter.	Team Ota	
High School Aurabuster	February 5, 1999	September 22, 1999	3	Adaptation of the light novel series by Mio Wakagi.	Team Iguchi	
Pokémon Pikachu's Winter Vacation 2	December 22, 1999	December 22, 1999	2	More short stories featuring Pikachu in the winter.	Team Koitabashi	
Steel Angel Kurumi Encore	January 7, 2000	March 1, 2000	4	Four additional short stories of the Steel Angels.	Team Wasaki	
Pokémon Pichu & Pikachu's Winter Vacation 2001	December 22, 2000	December 22, 2000	2	Short stories featuring Pichu and Pikachu in the winter.	Team Koitabashi	
Steel Angel Kurumi Zero	April 18, 2001	June 20, 2001	3	The side story of the Steel Angel Kurumi anime series.	Team Wasaki	
Early Reins	February 14, 2003	February 14, 2003	1	Tie-in to the cancelled game of the same name.	Team Iguchi	
Mizuiro (2003)	April 25, 2003	July 10, 2003	2	All-ages adaptation of the visual novel by NekoNeko Soft.	Team Iwasa	
Pokémon: The Mastermind of Mirage Pokémon	April 29, 2006	April 29, 2006	1	The 10th anniversary special of the Pokémon series.	Team Koitabashi	
Gift: Eternal Rainbow	April 29, 2007	April 29, 2007	1	Extra episode included in the 7th volume of the DVD release.	Team Iwasa	
Let's Go! Tamagotchi	November 29, 2007	February 14, 2008	12	Based on the Tamagotchi toyline by Bandai. Shorts released on Bandai Channel Kids.	Team Ota	
Tamagotchi Original Anime	December 12, 2008	December 12, 2008	3	Based on the Tamagotchi toyline by Bandai. Shorts released on Bandai's YouTube channel.	Team Kamei	
Pokémon: Sing Meloetta: Search for the Rinka Berries	July 3, 2012	July 3, 2012	1	Extra episode included in the August 2012 issue of Ciao.		
Bee and PuppyCat	November 6, 2014	November 28, 2016	10	Animated episodes 7–10.	Team Sakurai	
Pokémon: Hoopa — The Mischief Pokémon	June 19, 2015	June 19, 2015	1	Prologue to Pokémon the Movie: Hoopa and the Clash of Ages.	Team Kamei	
Kong: King of the Apes	April 15, 2016	May 4, 2018	23	The third animated series in the King Kong franchise. Co-produced with Arad Animation, 41 Entertainment and Sprite Animation Studios.	OLM Digital	
Pokémon Generations	September 16, 2016	December 23, 2016	18	Animated moments from generations 1-6 of the mainline Pokémon titles. Celebration of the 20th anniversary of Pokemon.	Team Kato	
Inazuma Eleven Outer Code	November 4, 2016	August 19, 2017	6	A series of shorts that take place between Inazuma Eleven and Inazuma Eleven: Ares.	Team Kawakita	
Tomica Hyper Rescue Drive Head Kidō Kyūkyū Keisatsu 2018	January 20, 2018	August 18, 2018	8	Sequel to Tomica Hyper Rescue Drive Head Kidō Kyūkyū Keisatsu.		
Inazuma Eleven Reloaded	April 5, 2018 (Note: First aired at the Inazuma Eleven Big Revival Festival event on January 21, 2018.)	April 5, 2018	1	Special prologue to Inazuma Elven: Ares.	Team Kawakita	
Beyblade Burst Rise	April 5, 2019	March 27, 2020	52	Adaptation of the manga by Hiro Morita and sequel to Beyblade Burst Turbo.	Team Abe	
Mono no Kami-sama Cocotama	September 26, 2019	February 21, 2020	12	Spinoff of Kira Kira Happy Hirake! Cocotama in which Kokoro Yotsuba and Haruka Hoshinogawa don't appear.	Team Yoshioka	
Beyblade Burst Surge	April 3, 2020	March 19, 2021	52	Adaptation of the manga by Hiro Morita and sequel to Beyblade Burst Rise.	Team Abe	
Zoids Wild Senki	October 17, 2020	March 12, 2021	6	Related to Zoids Wild.	OLM Digital	
Beyblade Burst QuadDrive	April 2, 2021	March 18, 2022	52	Adaptation of the manga by Hiro Morita and sequel to Beyblade Burst Surge.	Team Masuda	
Pokémon Evolutions	September 9, 2021	December 23, 2021	8	Animated moments from generations 1-8 of the mainline Pokémon titles. Celebration of the 25th anniversary of Pokemon.	Team Kato	
Bee and PuppyCat: Lazy in Space	September 6, 2022	September 6, 2022	16	Reboot of Bee and PuppyCat. Co-produced with Frederator Studios.	Team Yoshioka	
Beyblade Burst QuadStrike	April 3, 2023	December 2, 2023	26	Adaptation of the manga by Hiro Morita and sequel to Beyblade Burst QuadDrive.	Team Masuda	
Hot Wheels Let's Race	March 4, 2024	March 3, 2025	20	Based on the Hot Wheels toyline by Mattel. Co-produced with Mattel Television and Sprite Animation Studios.	OLM Digital	
Yokoso Scooby-Doo!	TBA	TBA	TBA	Based on the Scooby-Doo franchise created by Hanna-Barbera. Co-produced with Warner Bros. Animation.		

=== Music videos ===
Title	Release date	Artist(s)	Notes	Team	Ref.
White Reflection	March 13, 1997	Two-Mix			
Koi No Jellyfish	July 9, 2003	Kōji Kikkawa	Produced some of the CGI.	OLM Digital	
Good Morning	August 25, 2008	Kanye West	Directed by Takashi Murakami.	Team Ota	
Candy Pop	January 12, 2018	Twice		Team Kato	
It'll be fine!	January 13, 2022	Megumi Toyoguchi	Part of Project Pochama, which aimed to promote Piplup across Japan.	Team Kato	

=== Video games ===
Title	Release date	Publisher(s)	Notes	Team	Ref.
Bubble Bobble Part 2	March 5, 1993	Taito	Developed the 2D graphics.		
Sugoi Hebereke	March 31, 1994	Sunsoft	Developed the 2D graphics.		
Kid Klown in Crazy Chase	September 10, 1994	Nintendo (EU); Kemco (WW)	In charge of game setting production.		
Melty Lancer ~Ginga Shōjo Keisatsu 2086~	March 22, 1996	Imagineer	Opening, ending, and cutscene animation.		
Kid Klown in Crazy Chase 2: Love Love Hani Soudatsusen	December 6, 1996	Kemco	Opening and ending animation.	Team Ota	
Game Tengoku	June 6, 1997	Jaleco	Animation for the number 0 bundle.	Team Koitabashi	
Sōkū no Tsubasa ~GOTHAWORLD~	November 6, 1997	Micronet	Opening, ending, and cutscene animation.	Team Wasaki	
Texthoth Ludo ~Arcana Senki~	December 18, 1997	Pai	Opening and ending animation.	Team Wasaki	
Kunoichi Torimonochō	February 5, 1998	CRI Middleware	Opening, ending, and cutscene animation.	Team Koitabashi	
YAKATA Nightmare Project	June 4, 1998	ASK	Opening, ending, and cutscene animation.	Team Iguchi	
Dungeon Shōtenkai	October 29, 1998	Kodansha	Opening animation.	Team Koitabashi	
To Heart	March 25, 1999 (Note: Release date of the PlayStation port, which first featured the opening animation.)	Aquaplus	Opening animation.	Team Wasaki	
70's Robot Anime Geppy-X	May 27, 1999	Aroma	Game movie sequence.		
Addie No Okurimono - To Moze from Addie	February 3, 2000	Sony Computer Entertainment	In-game animation.	Team Koitabashi	
Tobaku Mokushiroku Kaiji	May 25, 2000	Kodansha	In-game animation.	Team Koitabashi	
Pokémon Puzzle League	September 25, 2000	Nintendo	Cutscene animation.	Team Ota	
Naniwa Kin'yūdō - Aoki Yūji no Seken Munazan'yō	July 19, 2001	Kodansha	In-game animation.	Team Koitabashi	
Pokémon Channel	July 18, 2003	The Pokémon Company (JP); Nintendo (WW)	Animated the "Pichu Bros. in Party Panic" episode.	Team Koitabashi	
Densetsu no Starfy 2	September 5, 2003	Nintendo	Partial CGI production.	OLM Digital	
Inazuma Eleven	August 22, 2008	Level-5; Nintendo (PAL)	Opening and cutscene animation.	Team Koitabashi	
Inazuma Eleven 2	October 1, 2009	Level-5 (JP); Nintendo (EU)	Opening and cutscene animation.	Team Koitabashi	
Inazuma Eleven 3	July 1, 2010	Level-5 (JP); Nintendo (EU)	Opening and cutscene animation.	Team Koitabashi	
Little Battlers Experience	June 16, 2011	Level-5	Opening and cutscene animation.	Team Koitabashi; Team Inoue	
Inazuma Eleven Strikers	July 16, 2011	Level-5 (JP); Nintendo (EU)	Opening animation.	Team Koitabashi	
Inazuma Eleven GO	December 15, 2011	Level-5 (JP); Nintendo (PAL)	Cutscene animation.	Team Koitabashi	
Little Battlers Experience W	October 18, 2012	Level-5	Opening and cutscene animation.	Team Inoue	
Inazuma Eleven GO 2: Chrono Stone	December 13, 2012	Level-5 (JP); Nintendo (EU)	Opening and cutscene animation.	Team Koitabashi	
Inazuma Eleven GO Strikers 2013	December 20, 2012	Level-5	Opening animation.		
Yo-kai Watch	July 11, 2013	Level-5 (JP); Nintendo (WW)	Opening and cutscene animation.	Team Inoue	
Little Battlers Experience Wars	October 31, 2013	Level-5	Opening and cutscene animation.	Team Inoue	
Inazuma Eleven GO: Galaxy	December 5, 2013	Level-5	Opening and cutscene animation.	Team Koitabashi	
Yo-kai Watch 2	July 10, 2014	Level-5 (JP); Nintendo (WW)	Opening and cutscene animation.	Team Inoue	
Yo-kai Watch Blasters	July 11, 2015	Level-5 (JP); Nintendo (WW)	Opening animation.	Team Inoue	
Yo-kai Watch 3	July 16, 2016	Level-5 (JP); Nintendo (WW)	Opening animation.	Team Inoue	
Pokémon Sun and Moon	November 18, 2016	The Pokémon Company (JP); Nintendo (WW)	Illustration support.		
Yo-kai Watch Busters 2: Secret of the Legendary Treasure Bambalaya	December 16, 2017	Level-5	Opening animation.	Team Inoue	
Tabe-O-Ja	November 28, 2020	Bandai	Cutscene animation.	Team Yoshioka	
Megaton Musashi	November 11, 2021	Level-5	Cutscene animation.	Team Inoue	
Megaton Musashi X	December 16, 2022	Level-5	Cutscene animation.	Team Inoue	
Pokémon Sleep	July 17, 2023	The Pokémon Company	Artwork.	Team Kato	
Megaton Musashi W	April 25, 2024	Level-5	Cutscene animation.	Team Inoue	
Ride Kamens	May 30, 2024	Bandai	Transformation sequence animation.	Team Kato	

=== Video game trailers/pilot films ===
Title	Release date	Publisher	Notes	Team	Ref.
Pokémon Black 2 and White 2	August 8, 2012	The Pokémon Company (JP); Nintendo (WW)	Animated trailer to promote Pokémon Black 2 and White 2.	Team Kato	
Pokémon Omega Ruby and Alpha Sapphire	November 16, 2014	The Pokémon Company (JP); Nintendo (WW)	Animated trailer to promote Pokémon Omega Ruby and Alpha Sapphire.	Team Kato	
Inazuma Eleven: Ares Game and TV Animation Pilot Film	July 27, 2016	Level-5	Pilot film for the Inazuma Eleven: Ares video game (now known as Inazuma Eleven: Victory Road) and TV anime.	Team Koitabashi	
Megaton Musashi Pilot Film	July 27, 2016	Level-5	Pilot film for the Megaton Musashi cross media project.	Team Koitabashi	
Inazuma Eleven: Ares Chō Shinsaku Eizō: Football Frontier-hen	March 27, 2017	Level-5	Promotional trailer for the Inazuma Eleven: Ares video game and TV anime.	Team Koitabashi	
Pokémon Masters	June 27, 2019	DeNA	Animated trailer to promote Pokémon Masters.	Team Kato	

=== Live-action TV series ===
Title	First run start date	First run end date	Episodes	Notes	Team	Ref.
New Oishinbo	January 20, 2007	November 14, 2009	3	Adaptation of the manga series written by Tetsu Kariya.	Team Miyagawa	
Tales of Night-Prowling Ghosts	February 3, 2007	March 31, 2007	9+3 unaired episodes (Note: Three unaired episodes were included in the DVD release.)	Adaptation of the manga series by Ichiko Ima. Co-produced with D.N. Dream Partners and VAP, Inc. Produced the CGI.		
Phone Braver 7	April 2, 2008	March 18, 2009	45+3 specials	Co-produced with Production I.G.		
Tenchijin	January 4, 2009	November 22, 2009	47	Produced the opening CG, as well as the castle and crowd scenes.	OLM Digital	
QP	October 5, 2011	December 28, 2011	12	Adaptation of the manga by Hiroshi Takahashi. Co-produced with AX-ON.		
Shinshū Sangaku Keiji Michihara Denkichi	June 6, 2012	October 28, 2015	4	Co-produced with TV Tokyo and BS TV Tokyo.	Team Miyagawa	
Idol × Warrior Miracle Tunes!	April 2, 2017	March 25, 2018	51	First entry in the Girls x Heroine series.	Team Miike	
Magical × Heroine Magimajo Pures!	April 1, 2018	March 24, 2019	51	Second entry in the Girls x Heroine series.	Team Miike	
Secret × Warrior Phantomirage!	April 7, 2019	June 28, 2020	64	Third entry in the Girls x Heroine series.	Team Miike	
Police × Heroine Lovepatrina!	July 26, 2020	June 27, 2021	48	Fourth entry in the Girls x Heroine series.	Team Miike	
Bittomo × Heroine Kirameki Powers!	July 11, 2021	June 26, 2022	50	Fifth entry in the Girls x Heroine series.	Team Miike	
RizSta -Top of Artists!-	April 10, 2022	December 25, 2022	38	Sixth entry in the Girls x Heroine series.	Team Miike	
Assistant Inspector: Daimajin	July 7, 2023	September 1, 2023	8	Adaptation of the manga by Takashi Nagasaki. Produced by TV Asahi, assisted production with Rakueisha.	Team Miike	
Shin Abarenbō Shōgun	January 4, 2025	January 4, 2025	1	Co-produced with Toei Kyoto Studio.	Team Miike	
Tokyo Holiday	April 4, 2025	June 20, 2025	12	Co-produced with TV Tokyo.		
Masked Ninja Akakage	October 27, 2025	March 30, 2026	20	Adaptation of the manga series by Mitsuteru Yokoyama. Co-produced with Toei Kyoto Studio.	Team Miike	

=== Live-action films ===
Title	Release date	Note(s)	Team	Ref.
Ninja Kids!!!	July 23, 2011	Adaptation of the anime series Nintama Rantarō.		
Hara-Kiri: Death of a Samurai	October 15, 2011	3D remake of the 1962 film Harakiri.		
Ace Attorney	February 11, 2012	Based on the video game Phoenix Wright: Ace Attorney.		
For Love's Sake	June 16, 2012	Adaptation of the manga series by Ikki Kajiwara and Takumi Nagayasu.		
Lesson of the Evil	November 10, 2012	Adaptation of the novel by Yusuke Kishi.		
Shield of Straw	April 26, 2013			
Asahiruban	November 29, 2013			
The Mole Song: Undercover Agent Reiji	February 15, 2014	Adaptation of the manga series by Noboru Takahashi.		
Over Your Dead Body	August 23, 2014			
Cardfight!! Vanguard: The Movie	September 13, 2014	Based on the trading card game created by Bushiroad. Produced the Three Games segment of the film.		
As the Gods Will	November 15, 2014	Adaptation of the manga series by Muneyuki Kaneshiro and Akeji Fujimura.		
The Lion Standing in the Wind	March 14, 2015	Adaptation of the novel by Masashi Sada.		
Yakuza Apocalypse	June 20, 2015			
Terra Formars	April 29, 2016	Adaptation of the manga series by Yū Sasuga and Kenichi Tachibana.		
Yo-kai Watch: Soratobu Kujira to Double no Sekai no Daibōken da Nyan!	December 17, 2016	Third film of the Yo-kai Watch franchise. Live-action/animated.		
The Mole Song: Hong Kong Capriccio	December 23, 2016	Sequel to The Mole Song: Undercover Agent Reiji.		
Blade of the Immortal	April 29, 2017	Adaptation of the manga by Hiroaki Samura.		
JoJo's Bizarre Adventure: Diamond Is Unbreakable – Chapter 1	August 4, 2017	Adaptation of the manga series by Hirohiko Araki.		
Laplace's Witch	May 4, 2018	Adaptation of the novel by Keigo Higashino.		
First Love	February 28, 2020			
Secret × Heroine Phantomirage! The Movie: We've Become a Movie	July 23, 2020	First movie in the Girls x Heroine series.		
Police × Heroine Lovepatrina! The Movie: Challenge from a Phantom Thief! Let's Arrest with Love and a Pat!	May 21, 2021	Second movie in the Girls x Heroine series.		
The Great Yokai War: Guardians	August 13, 2021	Indirect sequel to The Great Yokai War.		
The Mole Song: Final	November 19, 2021	Sequel to The Mole Song: Hong Kong Capriccio.		
Lumberjack the Monster	December 1, 2023	Adaptation of the novel by Mayusuke Kurai.		
Blazing Fists	January 31, 2025	Based on Street Legend, the autobiography of Mikuru Asakura.		
Sham	June 27, 2025	Adaptation of the nonfiction book by Masumi Fukuda.		
SHUMEI – The Living Legacy of Kabuki	September 25, 2026	Nonfiction film based on the succession performance of Ichikawa Danjūrō XIII. Co-produced with PlanD.		
Bad Lieutenant: Tokyo	October 23, 2026	Third installment in the Bad Lieutenant film series.		
Untitled Takashi Miike film	TBA	Upcoming slasher film from a screenplay by Ross Evans and Yumiko Aoyagi.		

=== Live-action net series ===
Title	First run start date	First run end date	Episodes	Notes	Team	Ref.
Tabe-O-Ja	November 4, 2020	November 26, 2020	4	Tie-in to the video game of the same name. Co-produced with L'espace Film.	Team Miike	
Gudetama: An Eggcellent Adventure	December 13, 2022	December 13, 2022	10	Based on the famous Sanrio character. Co-produced with L'espace Film.		
Midnight	March 6, 2024	March 6, 2024	1	Based on the manga series by Osamu Tezuka.	Team Miike	

=== Specials/commercials ===
- Pac's Scary Halloween (2015)
- Santa Pac's Merry Berry Day (2015)
- RYOTEI-NO-AJI "My Whimsical Little Boy" (Team Kato) (2023)
- Shaeb Abtal (2025)

=== Distribution/dubbing ===
- PAW Patrol (2019–present)
- Tinpo (2020–present)
- D.N. Ace
