= The Days (Japanese TV series) =

Japanese television series

- Promotional poster
- Genre: Biographical drama
- Based on: On the Brink: The Inside Story of Fukushima Daiichi by Ryusho Kadota
- Directed by: Masaki Nishiura & Hideo Nakata
- Starring: Koji Yakusho
- Country of origin: Japan
- Original language: Japanese
- No. of seasons: 1
- No. of episodes: 8

Production
- Executive producers: Hiroyuki Ikeda; Shinichi Takahashi
- Producers: Jun Masumoto; Daisuke Sekiguchi; Tomoki Masuko; Ryohei Takada
- Running time: 60 minutes
- Production companies: Warner Bros. Japan; Lyonesse Pictures

Original release
- Network: Netflix
- Release: June 1, 2023

The Days is a Japanese biographical drama series on Netflix with all 8 episodes released on June 1, 2023.

== Premise ==
The series follows Japanese government officials, Tokyo Electric Power Company employees and Fukushima Daiichi Nuclear Power Plant employees in Okuma, Japan in the wake of the 2011 Tōhoku earthquake and tsunami. The massive waves cause damage to the Nuclear Power Plant leading to the Fukushima nuclear disaster. The series explores the sequence of events in the immediate aftermath, where some consider the people involved to be heroes who prevented a much larger nuclear disaster, while others blame them for not preventing the disaster that occurred.

== Cast ==
- Kōji Yakusho as Masao Yoshida, station manager of the Fukushima Daiichi Nuclear Power Plant.
- Yutaka Takenouchi as Shinji Maejima, Supervisor of the control room unit 1 and 2 (based on Ikuo Izawa)
- Fumiyo Kohinata as Prime Minister Shinji Azuma (based on Naoto Kan)
- Kaoru Kobayashi
- Takuma Otoo
- Ken Mitsuishi
- Ken'ichi Endō as Koki Kirihara's father
- Yuriko Ishida as Koki Kirihara's mother
- Yūki Izumisawa
- Ōji Suzuka as Koki Kirihara, a 21-year-old turbine engineer assigned to Unit 4 (based on Yoshiki Terashima)
- Mitsuru Fukikoshi
- Tomomi Maruyama
- Hajime Inoue as the Chief Cabinet Secretary (based on Yukio Edano)
- Shigemitsu Ogi as the Minister of Economy, Trade and Industry (based on Banri Kaieda)

== Episodes ==
=== Season 1 ===
No.	Title	Directed by	Written by	Original release date
1	"The Fukushima Daiichi Nuclear Power Plant is Submerged"	Hideo Nakata	Ryūshō Kadota	June 1, 2023
2	"No Need to Evacuate"	Unknown	Unknown	June 1, 2023
3	"Radioactive Emissions Will Be Minimal"	Unknown	Unknown	June 1, 2023
4	"It Would Mean Turning Our Backs on Fukushima"	Unknown	Unknown	June 1, 2023
5	"Our Company Has Lost Its Mind"	Unknown	Unknown	June 1, 2023
6	"I Can No Longer Leave Here Alive"	Unknown	Unknown	June 1, 2023
7	"Decide the Conditions for Evacuation"	Unknown	Unknown	June 1, 2023
8	"A Scenario of Japan's Collapse"	Unknown	Unknown	June 1, 2023

== Production ==
In September 2022, Netflix announced its new series The Days would be developed, written, and produced by Jun Masumoto and directed by Masaki Nishiura and Hideo Nakata. Masumoto cites three specific publications as primary sources for the creation of the series: The Yoshida Testimony, which is the station manager Masao Yoshida's first-hand account of events; the official Fukushima Nuclear Accident Analysis Report; and journalist Ryūshō Kadota's bestselling book - On the Brink: The Inside Story of Fukushima Daiichi, for which he interviewed more than 90 people who responded to the accident.

=== Filming ===
The series was filmed in Japan, in the region where the actual disaster took place, the Fukushima prefecture in the Tōhoku region of Honshū. Filming began in June 2021 and was completed in October 2021.

=== Casting ===
The first cast member announced was Kōji Yakusho, set to lead the series as Masao Yoshida, the real-life plant manager at Fukushima.
