= Mogura no Uta =

Japanese manga series

- First tankōbon volume cover, featuring Reiji Kikukawa

土竜の唄
- Genre: Action; Crime
- Manga
- Written by: Noboru Takahashi
- Published by: Shogakukan
- Magazine: Weekly Young Sunday; (2005–2008); Weekly Big Comic Spirits; (2008–present)
- Original run: August 18, 2005 – present
- Volumes: 97
- Live-action films
- The Mole Song: Undercover Agent Reiji (2013); The Mole Song: Hong Kong Capriccio (2016); The Mole Song: Final (2021)
- icon

Mogura no Uta (土竜の唄; 'Mole's Song') is a Japanese manga series written by Noboru Takahashi. It was serialized in Shogakukan's Weekly Young Sunday from 2005 to 2008, and transferred to Weekly Big Comic Spirits in 2008. It was adapted into a live-action film, titled The Mole Song: Undercover Agent Reiji, released in 2013, which was followed by a sequel, The Mole Song: Hong Kong Capriccio, released in 2016.

By May 2023, the manga had over 10 million copies in circulation. In 2014, Mogura no Uta won the 59th Shogakukan Manga Award in the general category.

== Synopsis ==
Reiji Kikukawa is a delinquent police officer who is secretly recruited as an undercover agent. His mission is to infiltrate the violent yakuza syndicate known as the Sukiya and gain the trust of its chairman, Shuho Todoroki. To succeed, Reiji must abandon his former identity and ascend the ranks of the criminal organization from within.

== Media ==
=== Manga ===
Written and illustrated by Noboru Takahashi, Mogura no Uta debuted in Shogakukan's seinen manga magazine Weekly Young Sunday on August 18, 2005. The magazine ceased its publication on July 31, 2008, and the series moved to Weekly Big Comic Spirits on September 9 of that same year. Shogakukan has collected its chapters into individual tankōbon volumes. The first volume was released on January 5, 2006. As of October 30, 2026, 97 volumes have been released.

=== Live-action films ===
The manga was adapted into a live-action film titled The Mole Song: Undercover Agent Reiji, which was directed by Takashi Miike and released in Japan on February 15, 2014. Miike also directed the sequels The Mole Song: Hong Kong Capriccio (2016) and The Mole Song: Final (2021).

== Reception ==
Mogura no Uta won the 59th Shogakukan Manga Award in the general category in 2014. The manga had over 6.5 million copies in circulation by January 2016; and over 10 million copies in circulation by May 2023.
