= Too Young to Die! =

- DVD cover

Japanese name
- Kanji: Too Young to Die! 若くして死ぬ
Transcriptions
- Revised Hepburn: Too Young to Die! Wakakushite Shinu
- Directed by: Kankurō Kudō
- Screenplay by: Kankurō Kudō
- Produced by: Mitsuru Uda; Makiko Nagasaka; Hisashi Usui
- Starring: Tomoya Nagase; Ryunosuke Kamiki; Machiko Ono; Aoi Morikawa; Kenta Kiritani
- Edited by: Ryūji Miyajima
- Music by: Shutoku Mukai
- Production companies: J Storm; KDDI; Parco; Amuse Inc.; GyaO; Otona Keikaku
- Distributed by: Toho; Asmik Ace
- Release date: June 25, 2016 (Japan)
- Running time: 125 minutes
- Country: Japan
- Language: Japanese

Too Young to Die! (Japanese: Too Young to Die! 若くして死ぬ) is a 2016 Japanese horror comedy film directed by Kankurō Kudō. Tomoya Nagase played the lead role in the film, his first time doing so in 7 years. It was expected to be released on February 6, 2016, but was postponed because of a car accident scene that reminded people of a bus crash in Karuizawa. The film premiered at the 40th Hong Kong International Film Festival.

== Cast ==
- Tomoya Nagase as Killer K
- Ryunosuke Kamiki as Daisuke
- Machiko Ono as Naomi Kamei
- Aoi Morikawa as Hiromi Tezuka
- Kenta Kiritani as Cozy
- Kanji Furutachi as Matsuura
- Rie Miyazawa
- Nana Seino
- Arata Furuta
- Sarutoki Minagawa
