= Zebraman =

2003 Japanese superhero film

- Japanese film poster

Japanese name
- Kana: ゼブラーマン
Transcriptions
- Revised Hepburn: Zeburāman
- Directed by: Takashi Miike
- Written by: Kankurō Kudō
- Produced by: Aiko Hattori; Matoko Okada
- Starring: Shō Aikawa
- Cinematography: Kazunari Tanaka
- Edited by: Yasushi Shimamura
- Music by: Kōji Endō
- Distributed by: Toei Company
- Release date: 2004
- Running time: 115 minutes
- Country: Japan
- Language: Japanese
- Box office: $3.1 million

Zebraman (ゼブラーマン, Zeburāman) is a 2004 Japanese tokusatsu action comedy superhero film directed by Takashi Miike, written by Kankurō Kudō and stars Shō Aikawa as the main character, a superhero named "Zebraman".

In the film, a teacher feels frustrated with the failures of his career and his family life. He decides to assume the identity of the fictional superhero Zebraman, who he fondly remembers from his childhood. He exhibits actual superpowers, and learns that he has to face an alien invasion. He defies his new persona's predestined fate, as the original Zebraman story ended in the hero's death. The film was shot using a Panavision camera system based on the HDCAM camcorder HDW-F900.

A 2010 sequel, titled Zebraman 2: Attack on Zebra City, featured the addition of Masahiro Inoue of Kamen Rider Decade to the cast.

== Plot ==
It is 2010. A failure as a 3rd grade teacher and a family man, Shinichi Ichikawa lives with his cheating wife, his teenage daughter who dates older men, and his son who is bullied because of his father's presence in the school. Escaping from everyday life, Shinichi secretly dresses up nightly as "Zebraman", the title character from an unpopular 1970s tokusatsu TV series which he watched as a child before it was canceled after the seventh episode.

As a result of meeting a wheelchair-using transfer student named Shinpei Asano, also a fan of Zebraman, Shinichi not only regains his love for teaching but also develops feelings for the boy's mother. At the same time, a rash of strange crimes and murders have been occurring around the school at which Shinichi teaches. On his way to Shinpei's house in his costume to give him a surprise, Shinichi fights a crab-masked serial killer whom he defeats when he starts exhibiting actual superpowers.

Confronting more criminals who are possessed by a strange slime-based alien force, Shinichi learns that the Zebraman series was actually a cautionary prophecy of an actual alien invasion written by the school's principal, revealed to be an alien who refused to go through with the invasion and attempted to keep his kind from getting out from below the school before they kill him off and attack in full fury.

Though he knows how the show ends (with Zebraman's death and the villains victorious), Shinichi defies his predestined fate as he is the only person who can stop the aliens from taking over the Earth. As a result, when the aliens emerge from the ground, the government informs the United States, which will perform an airstrike on the aliens. Realizing this, Shinichi learns of his powers and defeats the aliens.

== Cast ==
- Show Aikawa as Shinichi Ichikawa/Zebraman
- Kyōka Suzuki as Kana Asano/Zebra Nurse
- Naoki Yasukochi as Shinpei Asano
- Atsuro Watabe as Oikawa
- Koen Kondo as Segawa
- Makiko Watanabe as Yukiyo Ichikawa
- Yui Ichikawa as Midori Ichikawa
- Yoshimasa Mishima as Kazuki Ichikawa
- Ren Osugi as Kuniharu Kuroda
- Teruyoshi Uchimura as Ippongi
- Akira Emoto as Kitahara the Crab Man
- Ryo Iwamatsu as Kanda
- Yu Tokui as Pyromaniac
- Yoji Boba Tanaka
- Arata Furuta - Eggplant Vendor
- Kumiko Asō as Clerk
- Yoshihiko Hakamada
- Miyako Kawahara
- Hideki Sone
- Masayuki Fukushima
- Satoru Hamaguchi Midori's boyfriend
- Hiroshi Watari - 1978 Zebraman

== Other credits ==
- Produced by
  - Shigeyuki Endō - planner
  - Kumi Fukuchi - planner
  - Akio Hattori - producer
  - Takashi Hirano - executive producer: TBS
  - Mitsuru Kurosawa - executive producer: Toei/Tôei
  - Makoto Okada - producer
- Production Design: Akira Sakamoto
- Sound Department: Yoshiya Obara - sound
- CGI producer: Misako Saka
- Lighting Director: Seiichirô Mieno

== Manga ==
The movie screenplay was adapted into a five volume manga by Reiji Yamada. The manga told its own story, focusing on the relationship the main character has with his two children. Unlike the movie, Zebraman never gains any powers, he is just a man in a suit.

== Reception ==
On the review aggregator website Rotten Tomatoes, 57% of 14 critics' reviews are positive.
