= Toma Ikuta =

Japanese actor (born 1984)

- 生田 斗真
- Born: Toma Ikuta; October 7, 1984 (age 42); Noboribetsu, Hokkaido, Japan
- Other names: Toma-chan, Tomasu
- Occupations: Actor; singer; dancer
- Years active: 1996–present
- Spouse: Nana Seino (m. 2020)
- Children: 1

Toma Ikuta (生田 斗真, Ikuta Tōma; born October 7, 1984) is a Japanese actor known for his roles in Hanazakari no Kimitachi e, Honey & Clover, Sensei!, Maō and Ouroboros. He also starred in feature films, notably Hanamizuki, Ningen Shikkaku and Brain Man.

== Career ==
Ikuta released a two–in–one book set to celebrate his birthday and his career's 30th anniversary. The "Solo Book" is a sort of photobook with images of his trip to Finland, with a companion DVD. The "Buddies Book" is a collection of interviews with close friends and people in his career life. It consists of three long conversations and two–person photos with Takumi Kitamura, Gen Hoshino, and Jun Matsumoto; conversation with Saya (Lalande) and Maximum the Ryokun (Maximum the Hormone); and testimonials from close friends Masaki Okada, Shun Oguri, Matsuya Onoe, Shunsuke Kazama, and Tomoya Nakamura.

=== Acting career ===
Ikuta entered Johnny & Associates in 1996, when he was 11. He made his debut as an actor in 1997, after realizing that he would not go on as a singer in a group, like his friends around him.

The 2007 Fuji TV summer drama Hanazakari no Kimitachi e, controversial in its gender-bending nature, was perhaps Ikuta's biggest break in Japanese Entertainment. Following his successful portrayal in Hana Kimi, Ikuta was on stage again as he starred in the Shakespearean play, The Two Gentlemen of Verona. While working on this play, Toma was also slated to star in one of Fuji TV's winter dramas for 2008, the live adaptation of Chika Umino's popular manga, Hachimitsu to Kuroba. He took on the role of Yūta Takemoto, a struggling Architecture student in an art school who had mediocre talent and who fell in love at first sight with his professor's niece, Hagumi Hanamoto (played by Riko Narumi). His role as the silent but constant observer that uncovers the events of the drama to the audience earned him another Best Supporting Actor award. Due to the popularity of Hana Kimi, Fuji TV decided to air a special two-hour episode, announcing it in early 2008.

Ikuta's rise to fame brought about another project; this time a double-lead with Arashi's leader Satoshi Ohno, in the Japanese adaptation of the Korean drama Mawang. The drama, called Maō, is about a lawyer, Ryo Naruse (played by Ohno) who seeks to avenge the death of his younger brother several years ago. On the other hand, Serizawa Naoto is the brash and impulsive detective (played by Ikuta), who is atoning for the grave, juvenile crime he had committed in the past. In October 2008, Ikuta was back on stage again, playing the role of Danny in the Japanese version of the musical "Grease". January 2009 marked Ikuta's first ever appearance in Fuji TV's peak slot for dramas, Ishimatsu Ryosuke, an intern forensics specialist in the serial drama Voice, along with Eita and Satomi Ishihara. Following his streak of solo projects, Ikuta was again named to star in a Fuji TV drama even while Voice was airing, this time a lead role in the timely jury drama Majo Saiban: The Witch Trial, for the TV station's spring 2009 late night Saturday drama. He plays Yoshioka Tōru, a freeter who was chosen as one of the members of the jury that will participate in the trial of a woman accused of killing her husband. Foul play comes into the picture as the members of the jury begin to be threatened. When the life of one of the jury members, a housewife (played by Ai Kato) is also endangered, Tooru tries to help. This raises suspicions with his girlfriend (played by Manami Higa) who becomes afraid Tooru might be cheating on her. Thus begins Tōru's lone search for the truth. The drama aired on April 25, 2009, a month before the jury system was to be implemented in Japan.

Ikuta finally made his silver screen debut with Ningen Shikkaku, a spring 2010 movie adaptation of Dazai Osamu's masterpiece of the same title. Considered a semi-autobiographical novel, Ikuta plays the role of Oba Yozo, a troubled soul who is forced to keep up a facade of hollow jocularity in his everyday life. The book cover of the novel published by Kadokawa was renewed in October, and since then featured a photo of Ikuta. After the cover was revised, the book sold over 100,000 copies. In response to those sales figures, Kadokawa decided that for a limited time period, all 10 Dazai novels would feature Ikuta on the covers; the campaign started on December 15, 2009. It was the first time that the lead actor of a film adaptation of a novel appeared on the covers of all the works written by the author.

He also appeared in Hanamizuki, co-starring Yui Aragaki, and Seaside Motel. Ikuta played the role of Honjo Sadame, a failure of an actor in the drama Unubore Deka along with Johnny senior, Tokio's Tomoya Nagase. In 2010, Ikuta appeared on the documentary TV program Jōnetsu Tairiku (情熱大陸, lit. The Passion Continent). Ikuta was the male lead role for the manga Bokura Ga Ita, where he played Yano, and has a relationship with Yoshitaka Yuriko (Takahashi). The shoot for the movie started in May 2011, and was released as a two-part film in spring 2012.

On July 27, 2010, Ikuta appeared in Tokio's music video for the song NaNaNa. In 2016, he appeared in the music video of the song Fukkatsu Love by Arashi, from which he had been teamed up as juniors with the three youngest members, as the group MAIN.

Ikuta had his own mobile J-web diary since 2005, named Ikuta Toma no Tomagoto (Ikuta Toma's Toma's words). The J-web went by the names Tomagoto, Tomagoto Hyper, and Tomagoto Neo, among others. Aside from the J-web, he also had his own corner on Wink Up Magazine titled Ikuta Toma no Ikita Kotoba (Toma Ikuta's Words to Live By). On this corner, he writes a one-page essay about things that interest him, as well as his daily experiences. Pictures taken from his own camera are included on the page.

On November 7, 2023, Ikuta announced he would be leaving Johnny & Associates on November 20, to work as a freelance actor.

After a "Question and Answer" session on his Instagram on May 5, 2024, Ikuta faced severe criticism, when a fan commented that she was 9 months pregnant and she was scared to give birth, to what Ikuta answered: "Do you want to beg your husband to be painless?". Many of the comments were referring to his use of the word おねだり (Japanese for 'beg') instead of something like お願い (Japanese for 'ask (please)'), or just wishing her well. Gynecologists and Obstetricians also participated in the criticism, citing that childbirth is not only painful, but also life-threatening. His apology 2 days later didn't help him either, having people consider his choice of words as old-fashioned, and questioning if the former Johnny idol as well as the artists still in the agency, which for most of its history banned SNS for their artists, are really prepared for using them.

=== Musical career ===
Ikuta debuted as a singer in January 2026, with the release of his single "Super romance", theme song for his drama "Panda yori koi ga nigatena watashitachi", after 30 years in the entertainment business.

== Personal life ==
Ikuta has a younger sibling, 4 years his junior, Fuji TV's announcer Ryūsei Ikuta.

Ikuta married actress Nana Seino on June 1, 2020. They welcomed their first child on March 9, 2022.

== Filmography ==
=== Television ===
Year	Title	Role	Notes	Ref.
1997	Agri	Young Junnosuke	Asadora	
1998	Love & Peace	Yohei Horiguchi		
2001	Neverland	Osamu Seto		
2002	Be Nice to People	Yusuke	Episode 5	
2002	Acting by	Hachida	Lead role	
2004	Yesterday's Enemy Is Today's Friend	Yasuhiko Hidaka	Miniseries	
2005	Funny Roppongi Squad	Yukio Ochi		
2005	To Asuka and to the Unseen Child	Sawamura Kazuya		
2005	Sleeping Corpse	Eiji/Yamazaki		
2006	Akihabara@Deep	Box		
2007	Boys Over Flowers 2	Junpei Oribe		
2007	Hana-Kimi	Shuichi Nakatsu		
2008	Honey & Clover	Yūta Takemoto		
2008	Devil	Naoto Serizawa	Lead role	
2009	Voice	Ryōsuke Ishimatsu		
2009	The Witch Trial	Toru Yoshioka		
2009	Tales of the Unusual: Autumn 2009: "The Law of Recycling Suicides"	Mikio	Lead role; short drama	
2010	Conceited Detective	Sadame Honjo		
2010	Spherical Wilderness	Shoichi Soeda	Miniseries	
2012	Late Blooming Sunflower: My Life Renewed	Jotaro Kodaira	Lead role	
2014	Gunshi Kanbei	Dom Justo Takayama	Taiga drama	
2015	Ouroboros	Ikuo Ryuzaki	Lead role	
2019	Idaten	Yahiko Mishima	Taiga drama	
2019	If Talking Paid	Mitsuru Kishibe	Lead role	
2020	The Man Who Stood for Autonomy of Japan: Prime Minister Yoshida Shigeru	Jirō Shirasu	Television film	
2022	My Ex-Boyfriend's Last Will	Eiji Morikawa / Tomiharu Morikawa	Special appearance	
2022	The 13 Lords of the Shogun	Minamoto no Nakaakira	Taiga drama	
2023	Taiga Drama ga Umareta Hi	Yamaoka	Lead role; television film	
2024	Beyond Goodbye	Yūsuke Nakamachi		
2025	Unbound	Hitotsubashi Harusada / Saito Jurobei	Taiga drama	
2026	Straight to Hell	Masaya Hotta		
2026	Sins of Kujo	Kuroudo Kurama		

=== Films ===
Year	Title	Role	Notes	Ref.
2010	Hanamizuki	Kohei Kiuchi	Lead role	
2010	Seaside Motel	Masayaki Kameda	Lead role	
2010	No Longer Human	Ōba Yōzō	Lead role	
2011	Genji Monogatari: Sennen no Nazo	Hikaru Genji	Lead role	
2012	We Were There: First Love	Motoharu Yano	Lead role	
2012	We Were There: True Love	Motoharu Yano	Lead role	
2013	Brain Man	Ichiro Suzuki	Lead role	
2014	The Mole Song: Undercover Agent Reiji	Reiji Kikukawa	Lead role	
2014	Miracle Debikuro-kun no Koi to Mahou	Kitayama		
2015	Grasshopper	Suzuki	Lead role	
2015	Prophecy	Geitsu / Hiroaki Okuda	Lead role	
2016	The Top Secret: Murder in Mind	Tsuyoshi Maki	Lead role	
2016	The Mole Song: Hong Kong Capriccio	Reiji Kikukawa	Lead role	
2017	Close-Knit	Rinko	Lead role	
2017	My Teacher	Kōsaku Itō	Lead role	
2018	My Friend "A"	Masuda	Lead role	
2021	The Mole Song: Final	Reiji Kikukawa	Lead role	
2022	Sing, Dance, Act: Kabuki featuring Toma Ikuta	Self	Documentary	
2023	The Dry Spell	Shunsaku Iwakiri	Lead role	
2023	Yudo: The Way of the Bath	Shirō Miura	Lead role	
2024	Confession	Keisuke Asai	Lead role	
2025	Demon City	Shuhei Sakata	Lead role	
2027	Sins of Kujo: The Movie	Kuroudo Kurama		

=== Dubbing ===
- Hexed (Beef Roger Crummchuk)

== Discography ==
=== Singles ===
- Super romance (2026) (digital)

== Musicals ==
- Stand By Me
- Kyo-To-Kyo
- Shock is Millennium Shock
- Susanoh
- Another (Kansai Jr. 2002 version)
- Shock is Real Shock
- Vacation (Shonentai Playzone 2003)
- Edogah-san Yukuefumei
- Mama Loves Mambo III
- West Side Story 2004 (Shonentai version)
- West Side Story 2005 (Arashi version)
- Azumi on Stage (2005)
- Azumi Returns (Azumi 2) (2006)
- Cat in the Red Boots (Shinkansen Nexus Volume 2) (2006)
- Shock – Endless Shock 2007
- The Two Gentlemen of Verona – October 2007
- Grease – 2008
- My Friend Hitler and Madame de Sade (Mishima Double)- February 2011
- Kamome(The Seagull)- September 2013
- Vamp Bamboo Burn – 2016

== Book ==
- Yohaku (two-in-one volume + DVD) ISBN 9784847086892 (2026)

== Awards and nominations ==
Year	Award	Category	Work(s)	Result	Ref.
2007	11th Nikkan Sports Drama Grand Prix	Best Supporting Actor	Hana-Kimi	Won	
2011	84th Kinema Junpo Awards	Best New Actor	No Longer Human	Won	
2011	53rd Blue Ribbon Awards	Rookie of the Year	No Longer Human	Won	
2020	13th Tokyo Drama Awards	Best Actor	If Talking Paid	Won	
