= Kikoku =

2003 Japanese yakuza film

- Directed by: Takashi Miike
- Written by: Shigenori Takechi
- Produced by: Saburō Naitō
- Release date: June 25, 2003
- Running time: 100 minutes
- Country: Japan
- Language: Japanese

Kikoku (鬼哭; distributed as Yakuza Demon in the United States) is a Japanese yakuza film directed by Takashi Miike. The film reunites Miike with Riki Takeuchi, who stars as the main character.

== Plot ==
Seiji (played by Takeuchi) grew up as an orphan who was raised by his boss Muto. The Muto family is composed only of the boss Muto, Seiji and Yoshi and serves as a branch of the larger Date family. When Muto is called upon to settle his dues to the gang, he instead vows to assassinate a top officer of the rival Tendo family. Seiji offers to carry out the assassination himself but Muto forbids it because Seiji already served a 15 year murder sentence for a gang related hit. A day later, Muto is arrested for possession of an illegal firearm and sentenced to serve two years in prison.

Seiji ambushes the leader of the Tendo family at his villa and leaves him in critical condition. This act compromises the future of the Date family, and the Tendo family responds quickly with a wave of brutal murders.

While visiting his girlfriend, Yoshi is killed by an assassin squad under the order of the Tendo family. After hearing of his boss's expulsion Seiji returns to the Date headquarters and shoots the first person who yells at him. A member of the Date clan explains boss Muto was expelled because he turned himself in to the police and went to prison in order to avoid carrying out the assassination. Seiji readily explains it was he who told on the boss in order to protect him. Seiji carries out the assassination of the number two boss but is shot shortly after.

Seiji then goes to the bar of Muto's wife Sachie, who takes him to a doctor. Soon after, Date is assassinated. The Taiwanese arms dealer shows up at Sachie's house with weapons. Before he leaves he tells her that Seiji must love her because of his actions. Boss Muto is murdered in prison. Seiji then retaliates by killing boss Muto's killer on the way to his trial. Seiji and Sachie plan to escape to the Philippines.

As their boat begins to arrive, Sachie throws Seiji's gun into the water with hopes of a peaceful future. As they turn to get their luggage, they notice Egawa, a policeman who had provided information to Seiji, hanging from a crane nearby. The two become aware they are cornered at the end of the dock and their boat turns around when it sees trouble. The assassin squad closes in on them and open fire as Seiji blocks all the shots from hitting Sachie. As Seiji lies dead, the leader of the assassin squad tells him that he is showing off too much. The squad then walks away without harming Sachie.

== Cast ==
- Riki Takeuchi as Seiji
- Hideki Sone as Yoshi
- Mickey Curtis
- Kenichi Endō as Budai
- Renji Ishibashi
- Koichi Iwaki
- Hiroshi Katsuno
- Ryōsuke Miki
- Yasukaze Motomiya
- Kazuya Nakayama
- Yōko Natsuki
- Gorō Oohashi
- Mikio Ōsawa
- Tetsurō Tamba
- Columbia Top as Millionaire

== Alternate ending ==
An alternate ending available on the home video release shows Seiji being shot by the assassin squad and then reaching into his chest and pulling out a glowing ball of force that he throws at the assassins, causing an explosion that can be seen from space, which is a reference to the ending of Dead Or Alive, another Miike film starring Riki Takeuchi.
