= The Mole Song: Hong Kong Capriccio =

- Film poster
- Directed by: Takashi Miike
- Written by: Kankurō Kudō
- Based on: Mogura no Uta by Noboru Takahashi
- Produced by: Juichi Uehara; Misako Saka; Shigeji Maeda
- Starring: Toma Ikuta; Eita; Nanao; Tsubasa Honda
- Cinematography: Nobuyasu Kita
- Edited by: Kenji Yamashita
- Music by: Koji Endo
- Production company: Oriental Light and Magic
- Distributed by: Toho
- Release dates: December 9, 2016 (IFFAM); December 23, 2016 (Japan)
- Running time: 128 minutes
- Country: Japan
- Language: Japanese

The Mole Song: Hong Kong Capriccio (Japanese: 土竜の唄 香港狂騒曲, Hepburn: Mogura no uta: Hong Kong kyōsō-kyoku) is a 2016 Japanese action comedy film directed by Takashi Miike from a screenplay by Kankuro Kudo based on the popular manga series Mogura no Uta by Noboru Takahashi. It is the sequel to the 2013 film The Mole Song: Undercover Agent Reiji and follows the story of Reiji Kikukawa after the events of that film.

== Plot ==
Undercover investigator Reiji Kikukawa, nicknamed "The Mole", has infiltrated the Hiura gang led by Masaya Hiura, a.k.a. "Crazy Papillon", and risen to the rank of second-in-command after eliminating the members of the clan who were involved in the illegal drug trade without authorization. A disgraced yakuza member forges an alliance with the Dragon Skulls, a Chinese gang, to take on the Sukiya-kai clan that is in control of the Kanto Region. Shuho Todoroki, head of the Sukiya-kai, becomes a target and his daughter Karen is kidnapped to be sold at a beauty auction in Hong Kong. Reiji once again tries to do the right thing while remaining undercover as he becomes entangled in a massive international conspiracy. Meanwhile, elite police officer Shinya Kabuto moves to arrest Reiji.

== Cast ==
- Toma Ikuta as Reiji Kikukawa
- Eita as Shinya Kabuto
- Tsubasa Honda as Karen Todoroki
- Shinichi Tsutsumi as Masaya Hiura
- Riisa Naka as Junna Wakagi
- Yusuke Kamiji as Kenta Kurokawa
- Nanao as Hufon
- Arata Furuta as Momoji Sakuraja
- Kenichi Endō as Kazumi Akagiri
- Sarutoki Minagawa as Doppo Fukuzumi
- Mitsuru Fukikoshi as Toshio Sakami
- Koichi Iwaki as Shuho Todoroki
- Ikumi Hisamatsu as Chirin

== Release ==
The film premiered at the 2016 International Film Festival & Awards Macao on 9 December 2016. It later received wide release in Japan on 23 December 2016. It had its North American premiere at the 16th New York Asian Film Festival 14 July 2017. By the first screenings, the film had ranked #5 at the Japanese Box Office, and earned ¥223 million (US$1.804 million).

== Reception ==
The film received generally positive reviews. Mark Schilling of The Japan Times wrote that Toma Ikuta is "a versatile actor" who plays "a goofy undercover-cop-cum-gangster". In a separate review of the film he wrote that The Mole Song: Hong Kong Capriccio is one of Takashi Miike's better films, noting that "Ikuta gives himself up totally to the idiocy of being Reiji, from his incurable awkwardness with women to his knack for stupidly getting himself into perilous situations." Maggie Lee of Variety wrote, "Despite the ragtag characters, sudden twists, and dizzying collage-like animated sequences, Kudo's literate screenplay and Kenji Yamashita's brisk editing manage to steer the main plot on course, making this one of the easiest-to-follow outings by Miike."

== Home video ==
The film was released on Blu-ray & DVD on June 14, 2017.
