= Manami Higa =

Japanese actress

- 比嘉 愛未
- Born: June 14, 1986 (age 40); Nakagami, Uruma, Okinawa, Japan
- Occupation: Actress
- Years active: 2003–present
- Agent: Rising Production
- Website: www.higamanami.com

Manami Higa (比嘉 愛未, Higa Manami; born June 14, 1986) is a Japanese actress. Her mother was a model. She graduated from Okinawa Prefectural Central High School. She gained recognition as an actress when she was selected in an audition of 2,156 people to star in the NHK Asadora Dondo Hare in 2006.

== Filmography ==
=== Film ===
Year	Title	Role	Notes	Ref.
2005	Letters from Kanai Nirai	Misaki Taira		
2007	The Prisoner			
2012	We Were There:Part 1	Akiko Sengenji		
2012	We Were There:Part 2	Akiko Sengenji		
2013	Tokyo Sky Story	Hiromi	Lead role	
2013	Tobe! Dakota	Chiyoko Morimoto	Lead role	
2016	Kanon	Ai Kishimoto	Lead role	
2017	My Teacher	Sachiko Nakajima		
2018	Code Blue the Movie	Haruka Saejima		
2021	Love and the Grand Tug-of-war	Atsuko Arima		
2022	The Master Sake Brewers	Asuka Nagamine	Lead role	
2023	The Pearl Legacy	Harumi Ōgame	Lead role	
2025	Emergency Interrogation Room: The Final Movie	Ami Ikoma		
2026	My Crazy Feminist Girlfriend			

=== Television ===
Year	Title	Role	Notes	Ref.
2007	Dondo Hare	Natsumi Asakura	Lead role; Asadora	
2008–2017	Code Blue	Haruka Saejima	3 seasons	
2009	Tenchijin	Kiku-hime	Taiga drama	
2012	Morimura Seiichi no Shikai no Fukuryū	Aki Yagiri		
2013	Bakken Record o Koete	Haruka Koutari	Lead role	
2013	Sousa Ikka Sawamura Keiji	Hatsumi Nagasawa		
2013	Yoidore Kotōji	Oryō		
2013	Nouhime 2: Sengoku no Onnatachi	Oichi no Kata		
2013	Sousa Ikka Sawamura Keiji 2	Hatsumi Nagasawa		
2014	Matsumoto Seichō Drama Special: Shi no Hassō	Aki Tsumura		
2014	Matsumoto Seichō Tsuyoki Ari	Motoko Miyahara		
2014	GTO	Honami Fujikawa	Season 2	
2015	Alone in Love	Haru Etō	Lead role	
2015	Samurai Sensei	Haruka Saeki		
2019	Natsuzora: Natsu's Sky	Kōko Maejima	Asadora	
2021	Japan Sinks: People of Hope	Kaori Amami		
2022	Emergency Interrogation Room: New Year's Special	Ami Ikoma	Television film	
2022–2024	She Loves to Cook, and She Loves to Eat	Yuki Nomoto	Lead role; 2 seasons	
2023	Ao Haru Ride	Kaoru Ichijō		
