= Aki Takejō =

Japanese actress (1947–2022)

- あき竹城
- Born: 4 April 1947; Yonezawa, Yamagata Prefecture, Japan
- Died: 15 December 2022 (aged 75); Tokyo, Japan
- Occupation: Actress

Aki Takejō (Japanese: あき竹城; 4 April 1947 – 15 December 2022) was a Japanese actress and comedian.

== Life and career ==
Born in Yonezawa, Yamagata, after her high school graduation Takejō started her career as a dancer, first working in Osaka and later in Tokyo, where she began her acting career. She made her acting debut on stage in 1974. Well known for her characteristic Yamagata dialect, beyond her career in films, stage plays and television dramas she was also very active as a comedian and had a busy career in variety shows.

Takejō died after a two-year battle against colorectal cancer on 15 December 2022, at the age of 75.
