= Kankurō Kudō =

Japanese actor and screenwriter

- 宮藤 官九郎
- Born: Shunichirō Kudō (宮藤 俊一郎); 19 July 1970 (age 56); Kurihara, Miyagi, Japan
- Other names: Kudokan (クドカン); Kunku (くんく); Kun (クン); Kanku (カンクちゃん, Kanku-chan)
- Occupations: Screenwriter, dramatist, film director, actor
- Known for: Ikebukuro West Gate Park; Kisarazu Cat's Eye; Ties of Shooting Stars; Amachan; Saving My Stupid Youth; Idaten; Go; Ping Pong; Maiko Haaaan!!! Zebraman; Zebraman 2: Attack on Zebra City

Kankurō Kudō (宮藤 官九郎, Kudō Kankurō; born July 19, 1970 in Miyagi Prefecture) is a Japanese screenwriter, dramatist, director, actor and member of the theater company Otona Keikaku. He won the 'Best Screenplay' award at the 2002 Japanese Academy Awards for Go, which explores problems faced by people of Korean-heritage living in Japan.

He acted in Crying Out Love in the Center of the World, and is also guitarist in the Japanese comedy rock band Group Tamashii.

== Selected filmography ==
=== Director ===
- Kisarazu Cat's Eye (2002, 1 episode)
- Boku no mahō tsukai (2003, miniseries)
- Yaji and Kita: The Midnight Pilgrims (2005)
- Shonen Merikensack (2008)
- Maruyama, the Middle Schooler (2013)
- Too Young to Die! (2016)
- A Town Without Seasons (2023, 5 episodes)

=== Writer (Film) ===
- Go (2001)
- Ping Pong (2002)
- Iden & Tity (2003)
- Kisarazu Cat's Eye: Japan Series (2003)
- Drugstore Girl (2004)
- 69 (2004)
- Zebraman (2004)
- Yaji and Kita: The Midnight Pilgrims (2005)
- Kisarazu Cat's Eye: World Series (2006)
- Maiko Haaaan!!! (2007)
- Shonen Merikensack (2008)
- Kamui Gaiden (2009)
- Zebraman 2: Attack on Zebra City (2010)
- The Mole Song: Undercover Agent Reiji (2013)
- The Mole Song: Hong Kong Capriccio (2016)
- Too Young to Die! (2016)
- Punk Samurai Slash Down (2018)
- The Mole Song: Final (2021)
- Sunset Sunrise (2025)

=== Writer (Television) ===
- Ikebukuro West Gate Park (2000)
- Rocket Boy (2001)
- Kisarazu Cat's Eye (2002)
- Manhattan Love Story (2003)
- Boku no Mahōtsukai (2003)
- Tiger and Dragon (2005)
- Wagahai wa Shufu de aru (2006)
- Ties of Shooting Stars (2008)
- Amachan (2013)
- Saving My Stupid Youth (2014)
- Prison Princesses (2017)
- Idaten (2019)
- Story of my Family!!! (2021)
- Let's Get Divorced (2023)
- Extremely Inappropriate! (2024)
- Shinjuku Field Hospital (2024)
- Did Someone Happen to Mention Me? (2026)
- Honno Mokichi (2028)

=== Actor ===
- The Thirteen Steps (2003)
- Fukumimi (2003)
- Crying Out Love in the Center of the World (2004)
- Kono Mune Ippai no Ai o (2005)
- Memories of Matsuko (2006)
- Tekkon Kinkreet [voice] (2006)
- Taitei no Ken (2007)
- Welcome to the Quiet Room (2007)
- Mōryō no Hako (2007)
- GeGeGe no Nyōbō (2010)
- Piece of Cake (2015)
- Quartet (2017)
- Ora, Ora Be Goin' Alone (2020)
- Because We Forget Everything (2022)
- Ichikei's Crow: The Movie (2023)
- The Dry Spell (2023)
- Mom, Is That You?! (2023)
- Seaside Serendipity (2025)
- The Brightest Sun (2026)
- Look Back (2026), Tamai
- The Real Killer (2027)

== Awards and honours ==
- Medal with Purple Ribbon (2025)
