= The Mole Song: Undercover Agent Reiji =

- Film poster
- Directed by: Takashi Miike
- Written by: Kankurō Kudō
- Based on: Mogura no Uta by Noboru Takahashi
- Produced by: Juichi Uehara; Misako Saka; Shigeji Maeda
- Starring: Toma Ikuta; Shinichi Tsutsumi; Takashi Okamura; Riisa Naka; Takayuki Yamada; Yusuke Kamiji
- Cinematography: Nobuyasu Kita
- Edited by: Kenji Yamashita
- Music by: Koji Endo
- Production companies: Fuji Television Network; J Storm; OLM; Shogakukan; Toho
- Distributed by: Toho
- Release dates: November 15, 2013 (Rome Film Festival); February 15, 2014 (Japan)
- Running time: 130 minutes
- Country: Japan
- Language: Japanese
- Box office: ¥2.2 billion

The Mole Song: Undercover Agent Reiji (Japanese: 土竜の唄 潜入捜査官 REIJI, Hepburn: Mogura no uta – sennyu sosakan: Reiji) is a 2013 Japanese film directed by Takashi Miike based on the manga series Mogura no Uta. It was released in Japan on February 15, 2014. A sequel, The Mole Song: Hong Kong Capriccio was released on December 23, 2016.

== Plot ==
Reiji Kikukawa is officially fired from active police duty for gross misconduct after numerous complaints, but his strong sense of morality leads his superior to secretly dispatch him as an undercover agent to infiltrate the Sukiya-kai, a ruthless yakuza gang, and arrest its fourth-generation boss Shuho Todoroki. He is instructed how to work undercover by Special Agent Kazumi Akagiri and sent to an illegal casino run by the Akogi-gumi, an arm of the Sukiya-kai. He intentionally gets caught cheating to meet the boss Masaya Hiura, a.k.a. "Crazy Papillon", who is impressed by his humor and exchanges vows of brotherhood with him, bringing him into the Sukiya-kai. Kazumi informs Reiji that he is sure that the Sukiya-kai makes its money from selling MDMA but he cannot connect the street dealers to the yakuza. Reiji asks Hiura if the Akogi-gumi is clean and Hiura explains that his father Masayoshii Ako says that "drugs are the root of all evil."
Junna, another policewoman on the force, is upset that Reiji is not responding to her texts and angrily texts that she will not pop his cherry if he does not respond soon. Kazumi sends her to a brothel called True Love in Kabukichō, where she and her fellow policewoman are recruited as escorts. Junna encounters Reiji at the brothel and is upset that he has decided to join the yakuza, unaware that he is a mole. Aiko, fifth-generation boss of Hachinosu-kai, the biggest yakuza clan in Kansai, wishes to take over Kanto and sends Issei Nekozawa, No. 3 of the Chibiki Family, to spark a conflict between the peacefully coexisting clans. Nekozawa attempts to rape Junna at the brothel but Reiji fights him and his men off. Hiura takes over the brothel as a new revenue source for their clan and rewards Reiji by introducing him to his father Masayoshi Ako.
At the meeting Reiji drops a pill of MDMA and Kenta Kurokawa picks it up. Reiji meets Kenta later to become partners in the drug business run by Ako and Kenta which is secret from everyone else in the Akogi-gumi. The two make a pact through a game of Russian roulette. Reiji informs Kazumi of this by phone but then he is captured by Kuroken, a yakuza biker with a full-body leopard tattoo, and taken to Nekozawa, who has shot his own men and plans to blame it on Reiji. Aiko calls and tells Nekozawa and told that Reiji has not yet taken part in the sakazuki ritual and therefore is not yet a member of the Sukiya-kai. Nekozawa vows to start the clan war as soon as Reiji takes part in the sakazuki ritual. The biker finds Hiura on the road and attempts to shoot him. Hiura knocks him off his bike and enjoys the banter they have, inviting him to continue their conflict as he leaves.
Reiji assists Hiura with some debt collection for the clan and Hiura personally flies them to Aoushi Island in a small plane to collect 40 million yen from Akio Sakuno, the man who brought Hiura into the life but whose formerly swank lifestyle has been destroyed by drugs. Akio has gone into hiding so Hiura and Reiji visit his parents Yahei and Shizue Sakuno to collect the debt but they find the elderly couple living in an old shack and Hiura instead gives them a gift of 2 million yen. Reiji is impressed and decides to take part in the sakazuki ritual in order to take out the drug dealers. Shuho Todoroki attends the ceremony where Reiji gives him the evil eye and is forced to explain that he plans to take out Shuho and become the head man. His passion reminds Shuho of the old days and they make him a yakuza, explaining that betrayal will mean his death and that he must now obey Ako as his father. Shuho acts as witness and witnesses Reiji wholeheartedly eat the ceramic saucer to combine it with his soul and Hiura acts as mediator to complete the ceremony.
Nekozawa immediately responds with war and attacks Reiji's crew on the street, where Hiura is seriously injured shielding Reiji from an exploding grenade. The Hachinosu-kai distribute a fake notice to their family and to the police that Reiji injured two unarmed members of their family in order to justify the war. While visiting the comatose Hiura in the hospital, Tsukihara tells Ako that the Russian mafia wants to sell a million pills of MDMA and that Nekozawa's clan tried offering 800 yen per pill but that was not enough. Ako replaces Hiura with Tsukihara as his No. 2. Reiji, fearing that he will die a virgin, has sex with Junna. Reiji tells the police about the drug deal and they tell him that Tsukihara is Ako's illegitimate child and must be arrested as well because he controls Ako's side businesses and finances. They also tell him that Hiura was abducted by a man with leopard tattoos. Hiura awakens in captivity, his legs having been amputated. A doctor who does not speak Japanese fits him with prosthetic legs.
Reiji convinces Tsukihara to tell him about the drug business and gives the police one of the cans from Tsukihara's dog food business used to transport the drugs. He must attend the drug deal aboard the Russian boat Crime & Punishment near the docks and avoid the DEA and the police who want him for attempted murder as well as Nekozawa in order to have Todoroki arrested and prove his innocence with the assistance of Kazumi's team waiting to ambush the yakuza. Tsukihara anticipates the ambush and instead secretly has the MDMA delivered by swimming dogs. Nekozawa surprises the police ambush and is chased off by them but then reaches Reiji and attacks him as Reiji pantomimes a swimming dog to the police running surveillance. The police attempt to sacrifice Reiji but he fights back with new confidence. Kuroken arrives on a motorcycle and brings Hiura, whose new legs enable the Crazy Papillon to take flying leaps and fight off the yakuza clans. Kuroken shoots a rocket launcher into a crane, which collapses and crushes Nekozawa. Reiji pursues Tsukihara and is shot by him but the bullet is stopped by the bulletproof vest that Junna fashioned for him. Reiji defeats Tsukihara in a fistfight and has him arrested. Tsukihara takes full blame for the drug deal so Reiji is unable to arrest Ako or Shuho but he is glad that he has stopped the war between the Sukiya-kai and the Hachinosu-kai. The film ends with Hiura pulling his fancy red car up to the hiding Reiji with Kuroken in the passenger seat and Hiura saying that he thought of something funny.

== Cast ==
- Toma Ikuta as Reiji Kikukawa
- Shinichi Tsutsumi as Masaya Hiura
- Takashi Okamura as Issei Nekozawa
- Riisa Naka as Junna
- Takayuki Yamada
- Yusuke Kamiji as Kenta Kurokawa
- Susumu Terajima as Sakuno Akio
- Junkichi Orimoto as Sakuno Yahei
- Kenichi Endo as Akagiri Kazumi
- Goro Ibuki as Chikuma

== Reception ==
By March 30, the film had earned US$20,392,349 at the Japanese box office. The film grossed a total of ¥2.2 billion in Japan. The Hollywood Reporter's Deborah Young gave the film a positive review, calling it "an irresistible cops and yakuza romp". Jay Weissberg of Variety said the film "will be right up the alley of Takashi Miike's many fans".

== Sequel ==
A sequel, again directed by Takashi Miike, was announced in January 2016 and was released on December 23, 2016.
