= List of Japanese films of 2023 =

This is a list of Japanese films that were first released in 2023.

== Highest-grossing films ==
=== Worldwide ===
The following is a list of the top five highest-grossing Japanese films released at the worldwide box office during 2023.

Rank	Title	Gross	Ref.
1	The Boy and the Heron	$294,200,000	
2	Detective Conan: Black Iron Submarine	$121,456,706	
3	Godzilla Minus One	$115,857,413	
4	Kingdom 3: The Flame of Destiny	$36,259,522	
5	Don't Call it Mystery	$32,488,540	

=== Japan ===
The following is a list of the 10 highest-grossing Japanese films released at the Japanese box office during 2023.

Rank	Title	Gross
1	The First Slam Dunk	¥15.87 billion ($112.96 million)
2	Detective Conan: Black Iron Submarine	¥13.88 billion ($98.8 million)
3	The Boy and the Heron	¥8.84 billion ($62.92 million)
4	Kingdom 3: The Flame of Destiny	¥5.60 billion ($39.86 million)
5	Godzilla Minus One	¥5.59 billion ($39.79 million)
6	Don't Call It Mystery	¥4.80 billion ($34.17 million)
7	Tokyo MER: Mobile Emergency Room – The Movie	¥4.53 billion ($32.24 million)
8	Doraemon: Nobita's Sky Utopia	¥4.34 billion ($30.89 million)
9	Demon Slayer: Kimetsu no Yaiba – To the Swordsmith Village	¥4.16 billion ($29.61 million)
10	Idolish7: Live 4bit – Beyond the Period	¥2.92 billion ($20.78 million)

=== Box office records ===
- The anime films Suzume and The First Slam Dunk set several box office records upon their international debut in 2023.
  - In South Korea, The First Slam Dunk became the highest-grossing anime film, before its record was surpassed by Suzume.
  - In China, Suzume became the highest-grossing anime film. It also set the record for the biggest opening for an anime film in China, before its record was surpassed by The First Slam Dunk.
  - The First Slam Dunk also set Chinese box office records for the highest pre-sales for an animated import, and the largest IMAX opening weekend for a foreign animated film.
- Godzilla Minus One set notable box office records.
  - Godzilla Minus One became the highest-grossing Japanese Godzilla film at the global box office.
  - In the United States, the film earned the highest-grossing live-action Japanese film (surpassing Milo and Otis), it holds the box office record for the highest-grossing Japanese-language movie, and surpassed Bong Joon-ho's Parasite (2019) as the third highest-grossing foreign-language film of all time.

== Released films ==
=== January–March ===
Opening		Title	Director	Cast	Ref.
J A N U A R Y	6	Familia	Izuru Narushima	Koji Yakusho, Ryo Yoshizawa, Lucas Sagae, Fadile Waked, Miyavi, Yutaka Matsushige, Kōichi Satō	
J A N U A R Y	6	We Make Antiques! Osaka Dreams	Masaharu Take	Kiichi Nakai, Kuranosuke Sasaki, Shōta Yasuda, Tomochika, Aoi Morikawa, Takeshi Masu, Takashi Sasano	
J A N U A R Y	6	Trapped Balloon	Hiroyuki Miyagawa	Masahiro Higashide, Tōko Miura, Kaoru Kobayashi, Miyoko Asada	
J A N U A R Y	6	Thorns of Beauty	Hideo Jojo	Honoka Matsumoto, Tina Tamashiro, Keisuke Watanabe, Ayumu Nakajima, Miyu Kitamuki, Oolonga Yoshida	
J A N U A R Y	13	Ichikei's Crow: The Movie	Akira Tanaka	Yutaka Takenouchi, Haru Kuroki, Takumi Saitoh, Osamu Mukai	
J A N U A R Y	13	Natchan's Little Secret	Yasujirō Tanaka	Kenichi Takitō, Shu Watanabe, Tomoya Maeno, Chieko Matsubara	
J A N U A R Y	13	And So I'm at a Loss	Daisuke Miura	Taisuke Fujigaya, Atsuko Maeda, Akiyoshi Nakao, Mieko Harada, Etsushi Toyokawa	
J A N U A R Y	13	Angry Son	Kashō Iizuka	Kazuki Horike, Gow, Masafumi Shinohara, Tomoka Murayama, Nobuhiro Morishita	
J A N U A R Y	20	Bad City	Kensuke Sonomura	Hitoshi Ozawa, Akane Sakanoue, Katsuya, Masanori Mimoto, Lily Franky, Rino Katase	
J A N U A R Y	20	Maku wo Orosuna!	Junji Shimizu	Yūki Koshioka, Mio Kudo, Yoshitaka Hara, Sho Takada, Ryuta Muro, Otsuki Toma	
J A N U A R Y	27	The Legend and Butterfly	Keishi Ōtomo	Takuya Kimura, Haruka Ayase, Hideaki Itō, Miki Nakatani, Hio Miyazawa, Ichikawa Somegorō VIII, Takuma Otoo, Takumi Saitoh, Kin'ya Kitaōji, Tsutomu Takahashi, Hirotarō Honda, Toshinori Omi	
J A N U A R Y	27	Gold Kingdom and Water Kingdom	Kotono Watanabe	Kento Kaku, Minami Hamabe, Hiroshi Kamiya, Miyuki Sawashiro, Subaru Kimura, Keiko Toda	
J A N U A R Y	27	The Lump in My Heart	Shingo Matsumura	Mizuki Yoshida, Takako Tokiwa, Daiken Okudaira, Atsuko Maeda, Himi Satō, Rii Ishihara, Masaki Miura	
J A N U A R Y	27	Lupin III vs Cat's Eye	Kobun Shizuno, Hiroyuki Seshita	Kanichi Kurita, Akio Ōtsuka, Daisuke Namikawa, Miyuki Sawashiro, Koichi Yamadera, Keiko Toda, Rika Fukami, Chika Sakamoto, Yoshito Yasuhara, Mugihito, Takayuki Sugō, Hiroki Tōchi	
F E B R U A R Y	3	Baian the Assassin, M.D.	Shunsaku Kawake	Etsushi Toyokawa, Kataoka Ainosuke VI, Miho Kanno, Yūki Amami	
F E B R U A R Y	3	Scroll	Yasuhiko Shimizu	Takumi Kitamura, Taishi Nakagawa, Mayu Matsuoka, Kotone Furukawa	
F E B R U A R Y	3	Demon Slayer: Kimetsu no Yaiba – To the Swordsmith Village	Haruo Sotozaki	Natsuki Hanae, Akari Kitō, Hiro Shimono, Yoshitsugu Matsuoka, Katsuyuki Konishi, Ryōta Ōsaka, Miyuki Sawashiro, Kengo Kawanishi, Kana Hanazawa, Toshihiko Seki, Ryōtarō Okiayu, Mamoru Miyano, Akira Ishida	
F E B R U A R Y	10	Egoist	Daishi Matsunaga	Ryohei Suzuki, Hio Miyazawa, Sawako Agawa, Yūko Nakamura, Iori Wada	
F E B R U A R Y	10	#Manhole	Kazuyoshi Kumakiri	Yuto Nakajima, Nao, Kento Nagayama	
F E B R U A R Y	10	Revice Forward: Kamen Rider Live & Evil & Demons	Koichi Sakamoto	Wataru Hyuga, Junya Komatsu, Ryosuke Takahashi, Rin Serizawa, You Imari, Hayate Kajiwara	
F E B R U A R Y	10	Sin Clock	Kenji Maki	Yōsuke Kubozuka, Ryōtarō Sakaguchi, Yō Aoi, Manami Hashimoto	
F E B R U A R Y	17	Blue Giant	Yuzuru Tachikawa	Yuki Yamada, Shotaro Mamiya, Amane Okayama	
F E B R U A R Y	17	Shylock's Children	Katsuhide Motoki	Sadao Abe, Aya Ueto, Yuta Tamamori, Akira Emoto, Isao Hashizume, Kuranosuke Sasaki	
F E B R U A R Y	17	Sasaki and Miyano: Graduation Days	Shinji Ishihira	Soma Saito, Yusuke Shirai, Yuta Tamamori, Yoshitsugu Matsuoka, Yūki Ono	
F E B R U A R Y	23	Yudō	Masayuki Suzuki	Toma Ikuta, Gaku Hamada, Kanna Hashimoto	
F E B R U A R Y	23	Call Me Chihiro	Rikiya Imaizumi	Kasumi Arimura, Hana Toyoshima, Tetta Shimada, Van, Miwako Ichikawa, Ryuya Wakaba, Yui Sakuma, Lily Franky, Jun Fubuki	
F E B R U A R Y	23	Sayonara, Girls.	Shun Nakagawa	Yuumi Kawai, Rina Ono, Rina Komiyama, Tomo Nakai, Airu Kubozuka, Himi Satō, Takuma Usa, Kisetsu Fujiwara	
F E B R U A R Y	23	Ultraman Decker Finale: Journey to Beyond	Masayoshi Takesue	Hiroki Mastumoto, Yuka Murayama, Nobunaga Daichi, Sae Miyazawa, Masaya Kikawada, Kayano Nakamura	
F E B R U A R Y	24	Red Shoes	Toshirō Saiga	Aya Asahina, Hayato Ichihara, Nozomi Sasaki	
M A R C H	3	And Yet, You Are So Sweet	Takehiko Shinjō	Kyōhei Takahashi, Mei Hata, Rihito Itagaki, Riko	
M A R C H	3	Doraemon: Nobita's Sky Utopia	Takumi Dōyama	Wasabi Mizuta, Megumi Ōhara, Yumi Kakazu, Subaru Kimura, Tomokazu Seki, Ren Nagase	
M A R C H	10	In Her Room	Chihiro Itō	Satoru Iguchi, Fumika Baba, Yuumi Kawai	
M A R C H	10	Eternal New Mornings	Tōru Yamamoto	Nanami Sakuraba, Yukiya Kitamura, Sae Aoyama	
M A R C H	10	Winny	Yūsaku Matsumoto	Masahiro Higashide, Takahiro Miura, Hidetaka Yoshioka, Mitsuru Fukikoshi, Yō Yoshida	
M A R C H	17	As Long as We Both Shall Live	Ayuko Tsukahara	Ren Meguro, Mio Imada, Tsutomu Takahashi, Sayaka Yamaguchi, Akari Takaishi, Ryoko Kobayashi	
M A R C H	17	Downfall	Naoto Takenaka	Takumi Saitoh, Shuri, Megumi, Rio Yamashita, Kazunari Tosa, Takashi Nagazumi	
M A R C H	17	Shin Kamen Rider	Hideaki Anno	Sosuke Ikematsu, Minami Hamabe, Tasuku Emoto, Nanase Nishino, Shinya Tsukamoto, Tōru Tezuka, Matsuo Suzuki, Mirai Moriyama	
M A R C H	18	Kumo to Saru no Kazoku	Yoshiya Nagasawa	Shōhei Uno, Eri Tokunaga, Shima Tabata, Tōru Nakamura, Kayoko Shiraishi, Eiji Okuda	
M A R C H	18	Single8	Kazuya Konaka	Yu Uemura, Akari Takaishi, Noa Fukuzawa, Ryuta Kuwayama, Narimi Arimori	
M A R C H	24	Brats, Be Ambitious!	Shin Adachi	Yukiya Ikegawa, Hikaru Tashiro, Kanade Iwata	
M A R C H	24	Gridman Universe	Akira Amemiya	Hikaru Midorikawa, Yuya Hirose, Yume Miyamoto, Soma Saito, Junya Enoki, Shion Wakayama, Yuichiro Umehara, Chika Anzai	
M A R C H	24	Do Unto Others	Tetsu Maeda	Kenichi Matsuyama, Masami Nagasawa, Akira Emoto, Ouji Suzuka, Maki Sakai, Yumiko Fujita	
M A R C H	24	Baby Assassins: 2 Babies	Yugo Sakamoto	Akari Takaishi, Saori Izawa, Atomu Mizuishi, Joey Iwanaga, Tatsuomi Hamada	
M A R C H	31	Nemesis: The Movie	Yu Irie	Suzu Hirose, Sho Sakurai, Yōsuke Eguchi, Kōichi Satō	
M A R C H	31	Rakudai Majo	Takayuki Hamana	Honoka Inoue, Mutsumi Tamura, Manaka Iwami, Kensho Ono, Ayane Sakura	
M A R C H	31	Goldfish	Shin'ichi Fujinuma	Masatoshi Nagase, Yukiya Kitamura, Kiyohiko Shibukawa, Kō Machida, Narimi Arimori	

=== April–June ===
Opening		Title	Director	Cast	Ref.
A P R I L	7	Princess Principal: Crown Handler – Chapter 3	Masaki Tachibana	Aoi Koga, Akira Sekine, Yō Taichi, Akari Kageyama, Nozomi Furuki	
A P R I L	7	Baian the Assassin, M.D. 2	Shunsaku Kawake	Etsushi Toyokawa, Kataoka Ainosuke VI, Miho Kanno, Kōichi Satō	
A P R I L	7	From the End of the World	Kazuaki Kiriya	Aoi Itō, Katsuya Maiguma, Aya Asahina, Mio Masuda, Ai Tominaga, Katsunori Takahashi, Kazuki Kitamura, Mari Natsuki	
A P R I L	7	My Beautiful Man: Eternal	Mai Sakai	Riku Hagiwara, Yusei Yagi	
A P R I L	8	Hold Your Hand	Hiroyuki Nakata	Kouhei Takeda, Koharu Sato, Sei Ando	
A P R I L	14	Detective Conan: Black Iron Submarine	Yuzuru Tachikawa	Minami Takayama, Wakana Yamazaki, Rikiya Koyama, Megumi Hayashibara	
A P R I L	14	People Who Talk to Plushies Are Kind	Yurina Kaneko	Kanata Hosoda, Ren Komai, Yuzumi Shintani, Gaku Hosokawa	
A P R I L	14	Side by Side	Chihiro Itō	Kentaro Sakaguchi, Asuka Saitō, Kōdai Asaka, Ameri Isomura, Mikako Ichikawa	
A P R I L	21	Tokyo Revengers 2: Bloody Halloween Part 1	Tsutomu Hanabusa	Takumi Kitamura, Yuki Yamada, Yosuke Sugino, Mio Imada, Gordon Maeda, Hiroya Shimizu, Hayato Isomura, Kento Nagayama, Nijirō Murakami, Mahiro Takasugi, Shotaro Mamiya, Ryo Yoshizawa	
A P R I L	21	The Village	Michihito Fujii	Ryusei Yokohama, Haru Kuroki, Arata Furuta, Nakamura Shidō II, Naomi Nishida, Ryuto Sakuma	
A P R I L	28	Tokyo MER: Mobile Emergency Room – The Movie	Aya Matsuki	Ryohei Suzuki, Kento Kaku, Ayami Nakajo, Anne Watanabe	
A P R I L	28	Okiku and the World	Junji Sakamoto	Haru Kuroki, Kanichiro, Sosuke Ikematsu, Claude Maki, Kōichi Satō, Renji Ishibashi	
A P R I L	29	Afterschool Anglers Club	Hideo Jojo	Toomi, Marupi, Tamao Hirai, Futaba Mori	
M A Y	3	Avataro Sentai Donbrothers VS Zenkaiger	Katsuya Watanabe	Kouhei Higuchi, Yuuki Beppu, Kohaku Shida, Totaro, Hirofumi Suzuki, Kiita Komagine, Shintarō Asanuma, Yuki Kaji, Yume Miyamoto, Takuya Sato	
M A Y	5	Father of the Milky Way Railroad	Izuru Narushima	Koji Yakusho, Masaki Suda, Nana Mori, Yūdai Toyoda, Maki Sakai, Min Tanaka	
M A Y	12	Adulthood Friends	Hiroto Takahashi	Mizuki Inoue, Rinka Kumada, Riku Hagiwara, Nana Asakawa	
M A Y	12	Psycho-Pass Providence	Naoyoshi Shiotani	Kana Hanazawa, Tomokazu Seki, Kenji Nojima	
M A Y	12	Go! Go! Sakura Club	Takanori Noda	Tatsuya Fuji, Saburo Ishikura, Masaaki Daimon, Kohji Moritsugu, Ichirō Ogura	
M A Y	12	If My Favorite Pop Idol Made It to the Budokan, I Would Die	Kentarō Ōtani	Tsugumi Aritomo, Kano Fujihira, Himena Irei, Sayuri Matsumura, Momoe Mori, Riho Nakamura, Jumbo Takao, Yudai Toyoda, Miu Wada, Soyoka Yoshida	
M A Y	12	The Quiet Yakuza Part 1	Kento Yamaguchi	Kentaro Ito, Miwako Kakei, Motoki Fukami, Yasukaze Motomiya, Hiroki Miyake, Yoshiyuki Tsubokura, Mariko Tsutsui, Susumu Terajima	
M A Y	19	Hard Days	Michihito Fujii	Junichi Okada, Go Ayano, Ryōko Hirosue, Hayato Isomura, Tetta Sugimoto, Akira Emoto	
M A Y	19	Synapusyu The Movie Push Hoppe New World	Takahide Shimizu	Iwamoto Sayaka, Hiroshi Tamaki, Takehide Shimakawa, Yuichiro Yanai, Yuki Matsumaru	
M A Y	19	My Brother, the Alien	Ken Iizuka	Tomoya Nakamura, Sairi Ito, Yūki Himura, Tokio Emoto	
M A Y	19	The Quiet Yakuza Part 2	Kento Yamaguchi	Kentaro Ito, Miwako Kakei, Motoki Fukami, Yasukaze Motomiya, Hiroki Miyake, Yoshiyuki Tsubokura, Mariko Tsutsui, Susumu Terajima	
M A Y	20	Idolish7: Live 4bit – Beyond the Period	Kensuke Yamamoto, Hiroshi Nishikiori	Kensho Ono, Toshiki Masuda, Yusuke Shirai, Tsubasa Yonaga, Kenn, Atsushi Abe, Takuya Eguchi	
M A Y	26	The Feast of Amrita	Saku Sakamoto	Maaya Uchida, Mamiko Noto, MoeMi	
M A Y	26	Rohan at the Louvre	Kazutaka Watanabe	Issey Takahashi, Marie Iitoyo, Fumino Kimura, Masanobu Ando	
M A Y	26	Spring in Between	Rika Katsu	Hio Miyazawa, Sakurako Konishi	
M A Y	26	Ripples	Naoko Ogigami	Mariko Tsutsui, Ken Mitsuishi, Hayato Isomura, Akira Emoto, Midoriko Kimura	
J U N E	2	Monster	Hirokazu Kore-eda	Sōya Kurokawa, Hinata Hiiragi, Sakura Ando, Eita Nagayama, Mitsuki Takahata, Akihiro Kakuta, Nakamura Shidō II, Yūko Tanaka	
J U N E	2	The Dry Spell	Masaya Takahashi	Toma Ikuta, Mugi Kadowaki, Hayato Isomura, Nanami Yamazaki, Yuzuho, Kankurō Kudō, Narushi Ikeda, Machiko Ono	
J U N E	9	The Water Flows to the Sea	Tetsu Maeda	Suzu Hirose, Riku Ōnishi, Kengo Kora, Ami Touma	
J U N E	9	Mentai Piriri: Flower of Pansy	Kan Eguchi	Hanamaru Hakata, Yasuko Tomita, Kimiko Yo	
J U N E	9	Dreaming in Between	Ryūtaro Ninomiya	Ken Mitsuishi, Miyu Yoshimoto, Haruka Kudō, Maki Sakai, Yutaka Matsushige	
J U N E	9	Pretty Guardian Sailor Moon Cosmos The Movie -Part I-	Tomoya Takahashi	Kotono Mitsuishi, Kenji Nojima, Misato Fukuen, Hisako Kanemoto, Rina Satō, Ami Koshimizu, Shizuka Itō, Junko Minagawa, Sayaka Ohara, Ai Maeda, Yukiyo Fujii, Nana Mizuki, Marina Inoue, Saori Hayami, Ayane Sakura, Megumi Hayashibara	
J U N E	9	See Hear Love	John H. Lee	Tomohisa Yamashita, Yuko Araki, Mahiro Takasugi, Maika Yamamoto, Motoki Fukami, Sayaka Yamaguchi, Mari Natsuki	
J U N E	16	Black Clover: Sword of the Wizard King	Ayataka Tanemura	Gakuto Kajiwara, Nobunaga Shimazaki, Junichi Suwabe, Kana Yūki, Toshihiko Seki	
J U N E	16	Immersion	Takashi Shimizu	Daigo Nishihata, Rina Ikoma, Yūta Hiraoka, Atomu Mizuishi, Noa Kawazoe, Ami Touma, Mizuki Yamamoto	
J U N E	16	Ninpuu Sentai Hurricaneger de Gozaru! Shushuuto 20th Anniversary	Katsuya Watanabe	Shun Shioya, Nao Nagasawa, Kohei Yamamoto, Yujiro Shirakawa, Nobuo Kyo	
J U N E	23	We're Broke, My Lord!	Tetsu Maeda	Ryūnosuke Kamiki, Hana Sugisaki, Kenichi Matsuyama, Fumiyo Kohinata, Aoi Miyazaki, Tadanobu Asano, Kōichi Satō	
J U N E	23	Insomniacs After School	Chihiro Ikeda	Nana Mori, Daiken Okudaira, Yuki Sakurai, Minori Hagiwara, Kaisei Kamimura, Seira Anzai, Riko Nagase, Honoka Kawasaki	
J U N E	23	Rascal Does Not Dream of a Sister Venturing Out	Sōichi Masui	Kaito Ishikawa, Asami Seto, Yurika Kubo, Nao Tōyama, Atsumi Tanezaki, Maaya Uchida, Sora Amamiya	
J U N E	23	River	Junta Yamaguchi	Riko Fujitani, Munenori Nagano, Takashi Sumita, Yoshifumi Sakai, Yūki Torigoe, Shiori Kubo, Saori, Manami Honjō, Yoshimasa Kondo	
J U N E	30	Tokyo Revengers 2: Bloody Halloween Part 2	Tsutomu Hanabusa	Takumi Kitamura, Yuki Yamada, Yosuke Sugino, Mio Imada, Gordon Maeda, Hiroya Shimizu, Hayato Isomura, Kento Nagayama, Nijirō Murakami, Mahiro Takasugi, Shotaro Mamiya, Ryo Yoshizawa	
J U N E	30	Life of Mariko in Kabukicho	Eiji Uchida, Shinzō Katayama	Sairi Ito, Yutaka Takenouchi, Yukiya Kitamura	
J U N E	30	Pretty Guardian Sailor Moon Cosmos The Movie -Part II-	Tomoya Takahashi	Kotono Mitsuishi, Kenji Nojima, Misato Fukuen, Hisako Kanemoto, Rina Satō, Ami Koshimizu, Shizuka Itō, Junko Minagawa, Sayaka Ohara, Ai Maeda, Yukiyo Fujii, Nana Mizuki, Marina Inoue, Saori Hayami, Ayane Sakura, Megumi Hayashibara	
J U N E	30	Mountain Woman	Takeshi Fukunaga	Anna Yamada, Mirai Moriyama, Masatoshi Nagase	
J U N E	30	A Life with My Alzheimer's Husband	Mitsuhiro Mihara	Shihori Kanjiya, Masato Wada	

=== July–September ===
Opening		Title	Director	Cast	Ref.
J U L Y	1	Heartless	Daichi Sugimoto	Daichi Kaneko, Yuumi Kawai, Takuma Fujie, Nijirō Murakami	
J U L Y	7	Our Secret Diary	Kentarō Takemura	Fumiya Takahashi, Hiyori Sakurada, Mizuki Kayashima, Ryōsuke Sota, Nagisa Saitō, Mizuki Itagaki	
J U L Y	7	Resident Evil: Death Island	Eiichirō Hasumi	Matthew Mercer, Kevin Dorman, Nicole Tompkins, Stephanie Panisello, Erin Cahill	
J U L Y	7	One Second Ahead, One Second Behind	Nobuhiro Yamashita	Masaki Okada, Kaya Kiyohara, Yoshiyoshi Arakawa, Masaya Kato, Aki Hano	
J U L Y	8	Kamaishi Ramen Monogatari	Akiyoshi Imazeki	Hiroe Igeta, Akana Ikeda, Gō Rijū, Hinako Saeki, Hiroaki Murakami	
J U L Y	14	The Boy and the Heron	Hayao Miyazaki	Soma Santoki, Masaki Suda, Takuya Kimura, Aimyon, Ko Shibasaki, Yoshino Kimura, Jun Kunimura, Kaoru Kobayashi	
J U L Y	14	Ice Cream Fever	Tetsuya Chihara	Riho Yoshioka, Serena Motola, Utaha, Marika Matsumoto	
J U L Y	21	Divine	Kiichirō Nakai	Yuzu Aoki, Akane Sakanoue	
J U L Y	28	Kingdom 3: The Flame of Destiny	Shinsuke Sato	Kento Yamazaki, Ryo Yoshizawa, Kanna Hashimoto, Nana Seino, Anne Watanabe, Yuki Yamada, Amane Okayama, Takahiro Miura, Kataoka Ainosuke VI, Koji Yamamoto, Hiroshi Tamaki, Kōichi Satō, Takao Osawa	
J U L Y	28	Yoko	Kazuyoshi Kumakiri	Rinko Kikuchi, Joe Odagiri, Takehara Pistol, Asuka Kurosawa, Jun Fubuki	
J U L Y	28	Kamen Rider Geats: 4 Aces and the Black Fox	Shojiro Nakazawa	Hideyoshi Kan, Ryuga Sato, Yuna Hoshino, Kazuto Mokudai, Kokoro Aoshima, Tsubasa Sakiyama	
J U L Y	28	Ohsama Sentai King-Ohger: Adventure Heaven	Kazuya Kamihoriuchi	Taisei Sakai, Aoto Watanabe, Erica Murakami, Yuzuki Hirakawa, So Kaku, Masashi Ikeda, Kishō Taniyama	
A U G U S T	3	Zom 100: Bucket List of the Dead	Yūsuke Ishida	Eiji Akaso, Mai Shiraishi, Shuntarō Yanagi, Kazuki Kitamura	
A U G U S T	4	New Dimension! Crayon Shinchan the Movie: Battle of Supernatural Powers: Flying Sushi	Hitoshi Ōne	Yumiko Kobayashi, Miki Narahashi, Toshiyuki Morikawa, Satomi Kōrogi, Mari Mashiba	
A U G U S T	11	Revolver Lily	Isao Yukisada	Haruka Ayase, Hiroki Hasegawa, Jinsei Hamura, Jesse, Kavka Shishido, Kotone Furukawa, Hiroya Shimizu, Sadao Abe, Mansai Nomura, Etsushi Toyokawa	
A U G U S T	11	Sana	Takashi Shimizu	Alan Shirahama, Ryota Katayose, Ryuto Kazuhara, Hayato Komori, Reo Sano, Mandy Sekiguchi, Yuta Nakatsuka, Akari Hayami, Makita Sports	
A U G U S T	18	Sand Land	Toshihisa Yokoshima	Mutsumi Tamura, Kazuhiro Yamaji, Chō, Satoshi Tsuruoka, Nobuo Tobita	
A U G U S T	18	Okashiratsuki	Mikiya Sanada	Eito Konishi, Ayaka Ōhira	
A U G U S T	19	Love Will Tear Us Apart	Ken'ichi Ugana	Sayu Kubota, Yuzu Aoki, Riko, Yūtarō, Atsuko Maeda	
A U G U S T	25	One Last Bloom	Takahisa Zeze	Kōichi Satō, Ryusei Yokohama, Tomoko Yamaguchi, Kanna Hashimoto, Masataka Kubota	
A U G U S T	25	G-Men	Tōichirō Rutō	Yuta Kishi, Ryo Ryusei, Yuri Tsunematsu, Yūma Yamoto, Shintaro Morimoto, Rintarō, Riho Yoshioka, Kengo Kora, Onoe Matsuya II, Kei Tanaka	
A U G U S T	25	#Mito	Daisuke Miyazaki	Tina Tamashiro, Hina Yukawa, Yu Inaba, Reiko Kataoka, Yumi Adachi, Mariko Tsutsui	
S E P T E M B E R	1	Mom, Is That You?!	Yoji Yamada	Sayuri Yoshinaga, Yo Oizumi, Mei Nagano, You, Moe Edamoto, Kankurō Kudō, Min Tanaka, Akira Terao	
S E P T E M B E R	1	You Made My Dawn	Mai Sakai	Ruki Shiroiwa, Rinka Kumada, Yumena Yanai, Oolongta Yoshida	
S E P T E M B E R	1	Home Sweet Home	Takumi Saitoh	Masataka Kubota, Misako Renbutsu, Nao, Yōsuke Kubozuka	
S E P T E M B E R	1	September 1923	Tatsuya Mori	Arata Iura, Rena Tanaka, Eita Nagayama, Masahiro Higashide, KOM_I, Akira Emoto	
S E P T E M B E R	1	Tsugaru Lacquer Girl	Keiko Tsuruoka	Mayu Hotta, Kaoru Kobayashi, Ryōta Bandō, Toshiya Miyata	
S E P T E M B E R	1	Bakuryu Sentai Abaranger 20th: Unforgivable Abare	Hisashi Kimura	Koichiro Nishi, Sho Tomita, Aiko Ito, Kaoru Abe, Koutaro Tanaka	
S E P T E M B E R	1	Saga Saga	Aimi Natsuto	Rena Matsui, Sae Okazaki, Sara Kurashima	
S E P T E M B E R	8	The Forbidden Play	Hideo Nakata	Kanna Hashimoto, Daiki Shigeoka	
S E P T E M B E R	8	Fly On	Takuya Katō	Mugi Kadowaki, Kentarō Tamura, Haru Kuroki, Shota Sometani	
S E P T E M B E R	8	City Hunter The Movie: Angel Dust	Kazuyoshi Takeuchi	Akira Kamiya, Kazue Ikura, Ichiryūsai Harumi, Tesshō Genda, Mami Koyama, Kenyu Horiuchi, Miyuki Sawashiro, Keiko Toda	
S E P T E M B E R	8	Yoshiki: Under the Sky	Yoshiki	Yoshiki, The Chainsmokers, St. Vincent, Sarah Brightman, Scorpions, Hyde, Sugizo, SixTones, Jane Zhang, Lindsey Stirling, Nicole Scherzinger	
S E P T E M B E R	14	Once Upon a Crime	Yūichi Fukuda	Kanna Hashimoto, Yuko Araki, Takanori Iwata	
S E P T E M B E R	15	Don't Call it Mystery	Hiroaki Matsuyama	Masaki Suda, Nanoka Hara, Kouhei Matsushita, Keita Machida, Riku Hagiwara, Kenichi Takitō, Nanako Matsushima, Takuzō Kadono, Yasunori Danta, Ko Shibasaki	
S E P T E M B E R	15	Precure All Stars F	Yuta Tanaka	Akira Sekine, Hana Hishikawa, Ai Kakuma, Aoi Koga, Ayumu Murase, Ayaka Nanase, Ai Kayano, Natsumi Takamori, Maaya Sakamoto, Atsumi Tanezaki	
S E P T E M B E R	15	Maboroshi	Mari Okada	Junya Enoki, Reina Ueda, Misaki Kuno	
S E P T E M B E R	29	The Silent Service	Kōhei Yoshino	Takao Osawa, Hiroshi Tamaki, Aya Ueto, Yūsuke Santamaria, Tomoya Nakamura, Aoi Nakamura, Asami Mizukawa, Yōsuke Eguchi	
S E P T E M B E R	29	Bad Lands	Masato Harada	Sakura Ando, Ryosuke Yamada, Ryudo Uzaki, Noriko Eguchi, Katsuhisa Namase, Yoshimi Tendo	

=== October–December ===
Opening		Title	Director	Cast	Ref.
O C T O B E R	6	Girls und Panzer das Finale: Part 4	Tsutomu Mizushima	Mai Fuchigami, Ai Kayano, Mami Ozaki, Ikumi Nakagami, Yuka Iguchi	
O C T O B E R	6	Between the White Key and the Black Key	Masanori Tominaga	Sosuke Ikematsu, Riisa Naka, Gō Morita, Kazuya Takahashi, Crystal Kay, Takashi Matsuo	
O C T O B E R	6	Undercurrent	Rikiya Imaizumi	Yōko Maki, Arata Iura, Lily Franky, Eita Nagayama, Noriko Eguchi, Rio Uchida	
O C T O B E R	6	Analog	Hideta Takahata	Kazunari Ninomiya, Haru, Kenta Kiritani, Kenta Hamano, Yuka Itaya, Keiko Takahashi, Lily Franky	
O C T O B E R	6	The Pearl Legacy	Mitsutoshi Tanaka	Manami Higa, Shohei Miura, Mako Ishino, Tomokazu Miura	
O C T O B E R	13	Kyrie	Shunji Iwai	Aina the End, Hokuto Matsumura, Haru Kuroki, Suzu Hirose	
O C T O B E R	13	We're Millennials. Got a Problem?: The Movie	Nobuo Mizuta	Masaki Okada, Tori Matsuzaka, Yuya Yagira	
O C T O B E R	13	Picture of Spring	Akihiko Shiota	Seiyō Uchino, Kana Kita, Tasuku Emoto, Yumi Adachi	
O C T O B E R	13	Kaina of the Great Snow Sea: Star Sage	Hiroaki Ando	Yoshimasa Hosoya, Rie Takahashi, Ayumu Murase, Maaya Sakamoto, Katsuyuki Konishi	
O C T O B E R	13	The Moon	Yuya Ishii	Rie Miyazawa, Hayato Isomura, Joe Odagiri, Fumi Nikaido	
O C T O B E R	13	Daisuke Jigen	Hajime Hashimoto	Tetsuji Tamayama, Yōko Maki, Kotoka Maki, Honami Satō, Masatoshi Nagase, Mitsuko Kusabue	
O C T O B E R	20	Confess to Your Crimes	Nobuo Mizuta	Kento Nakajima, Shinichi Tsutsumi, Elaiza Ikeda, Ikusaburo Yamazaki, Ayumu Nakajima, Minami, Machiko Ono, Takuzo Kadono	
O C T O B E R	20	Nightmare Resort	Jirō Nagae	Rikka Ihara, Taiyu Fujiwara, Shiori Akita, Zen Kajihara, Hinako Saeki	
O C T O B E R	20	The Concierge	Yoshimi Itazu	Natsumi Kawaida, Takeo Ōtsuka, Kenjiro Tsuda, Nobuo Tobita, Megumi Han	
O C T O B E R	21	Hoshi 35	Hiroto Yokokawa	Megumi Odaka, Jun Hashizume, Yumiko Tanaka, Hiroshi Miyazaka, Daijiro Harada, Masanori Kikuzawa	
O C T O B E R	27	How to Find a Lover	Kōji Maeda	Yūki Kura, Haruka Imou, Yōta Kawase, Ryo Narita, Shōhei Uno	
O C T O B E R	27	Masked Hearts	Yuya Ishii	Mayu Matsuoka, Masataka Kubota, Kōichi Satō, Sosuke Ikematsu, Ryuya Wakaba	
O C T O B E R	27	Six Singing Women	Yoshimasa Ishibashi	Yutaka Takenouchi, Takayuki Yamada, Asami Mizukawa	
N O V E M B E R	2	Knuckle Girl	Chang	Ayaka Miyoshi, Gōki Maeda, Yōsuke Kubozuka, Hideaki Itō	
N O V E M B E R	3	Godzilla Minus One	Takashi Yamazaki	Ryunosuke Kamiki, Minami Hamabe, Yuki Yamada, Munetaka Aoki, Miou Tanaka, Hidetaka Yoshioka, Sakura Ando, Kuranosuke Sasaki	
N O V E M B E R	3	Family	Kan Sawa	Ryo Yoshizawa, Masatoshi Nagase, Shun Oguri, Shinnosuke Abe	
N O V E M B E R	10	The Innocent Game	Yoshihiro Fukagawa	Ren Nagase, Hana Sugisaki, Takumi Kitamura, Nao Ōmori, Akira Emoto, Junki Tozuka	
N O V E M B E R	10	(Ab)normal Desire	Yoshiyuki Kishi	Goro Inagaki, Yui Aragaki, Hayato Isomura, Kanta Sato, Ayaka Higashino	
N O V E M B E R	10	A Spoiling Rain	Haruhiko Arai	Go Ayano, Tasuku Emoto, Honami Satō	
N O V E M B E R	10	Komada: A Whisky Family	Masayuki Yoshihara	Saori Hayami, Kensho Ono, Maaya Uchida, Yoshimasa Hosoya	
N O V E M B E R	16	In Love and Deep Water	Yūsuke Taki	Ryo Yoshizawa, Aoi Miyazaki, Yō Yoshida, Rinko Kikuchi, Ken Yasuda, Kento Nagayama, Yuki Izumisawa, Amane Okayama, Airi Matsui, Yoshimasa Kondo	
N O V E M B E R	17	Birth of Kitarō: The Mystery of GeGeGe	Gō Koga	Toshihiko Seki, Hidenobu Kiuchi, Atsumi Tanezaki, Yumiko Kobayashi, Toshio Furukawa, Miyuki Sawashiro, Umeka Shōji, Masako Nozawa	
N O V E M B E R	17	Out	Hiroshi Shinagawa	Yūki Kura, Kotaro Daigo, Yūki Yoda, Koshi Mizukami	
N O V E M B E R	17	Corpo a Corpo	Masaaki Jindō	Fumika Baba, Masahiro Higashide, Yūki Kura, Takashi Sasano, Reiko Kataoka	
N O V E M B E R	17	Wheels and Axle	Junpei Matsumoto	Masato Yano, Uri Suzuki, Atomu Mizuishi	
N O V E M B E R	23	Kubi	Takeshi Kitano	Beat Takeshi, Hidetoshi Nishijima, Ryo Kase, Tadanobu Asano, Nao Ōmori, Nakamura Shidō II, Yūichi Kimua, Kaoru Kobayashi	
N O V E M B E R	23	Fly Me to the Saitama: From Biwa Lake with Love	Hideki Takeuchi	Fumi Nikaido, Gackt, Anne Watanabe, Kataoka Ainosuke VI	
N O V E M B E R	25	Shadow of Fire	Shinya Tsukamoto	Shuri, Mirai Moriyama, Ōga Tsukao, Hiroki Kōno	
D E C E M B E R	1	Lumberjack the Monster	Takashi Miike	Kazuya Kamenashi, Nanao, Riho Yoshioka, Nakamura Shidō II, Shota Sometani	
D E C E M B E R	1	Refugee X	Naoto Kumazawa	Juri Ueno, Kento Hayashi, Huang Pei-jia, Shūhei Nomura, Yoshi Sakou	
D E C E M B E R	1	When Morning Comes, I Feel Empty	Yuho Ishibashi	Erika Karata, Haruka Imou, Kazuma Ishibashi, Oto Abe, Yuto Nakayama, Toshihiro Yashiba	
D E C E M B E R	8	Till We Meet Again on the Lily Hill	Yōichi Narita	Haruka Fukuhara, Koshi Mizukami, Kentaro Ito, Natsuki Deguchi, Keiko Matsuzaka	
D E C E M B E R	8	My Next Life as a Villainess: All Routes Lead to Doom! The Movie	Keisuke Inoue	Maaya Uchida, Shouta Aoi, Tetsuya Kakihara, Tatsuhisa Suzuki, Yoshitsugu Matsuoka, Miho Okasaki, Inori Minase, Saori Hayami	
D E C E M B E R	8	Totto-Chan: The Little Girl at the Window	Shinnosuke Yakuwa	Ririana Ōno, Shun Oguri, Anne Watanabe, Karen Takizawa, Koji Yakusho	
D E C E M B E R	8	Ichiko	Akihiro Toda	Hana Sugisaki, Ryuya Wakaba, Yūki Morinaga, Daichi Watanabe, Shōhei Uno, Yuri Nakamura	
D E C E M B E R	15	The Imaginary	Yoshiyuki Momose	Kokoro Terada, Rio Suzuki, Sakura Ando, Riisa Naka, Takayuki Yamada, Atsuko Takahata, Issey Ogata	
D E C E M B E R	22	Spy x Family Code: White	Takashi Katagiri	Takuya Eguchi, Atsumi Tanezaki, Saori Hayami, Kenichirou Matsuda	
D E C E M B E R	22	Perfect Days	Wim Wenders	Koji Yakusho, Tokio Emoto, Aoi Yamada, Arisa Nakano, Yumi Asō, Sayuri Ishikawa, Min Tanaka, Tomokazu Miura	
D E C E M B E R	22	Kamen Rider The Winter Movie: Gotchard & Geats Strongest Chemy★Great Gotcha Operation	Kyohei Yamaguchi	Hideyoshi Kan, Ryuga Sato, Yuna Hoshino, Kazuto Mokudai, Kokoro Aoshima, Tom Constantine, Reiyo Matsumoto, Yasunari Fujibayashi, Oto Abe, Rikiya Tomizono, Rikuto Kumaki, Misato Fukuen, Apparebushido, Ryota Osaka, Ayasa Ito, Yoko Minamino, Kanji Ishimaru, Yasukaze Motomiya	

== See also ==
- List of 2023 box office number-one films in Japan
- 2023 in Japan
- 2023 in Japanese television
