= 2023 in Japan =

- Decades: 2000s; 2010s; 2020s; 2030s
- See also: Other events of 2023; History of Japan • Timeline • Years

Events in the year 2023 in Japan.

== Incumbents ==
- Emperor: Naruhito
- Prime Minister: Fumio Kishida
- Chief Cabinet Secretary
  - Hirokazu Matsuno (until December 14)
  - Yoshimasa Hayashi (starting December 14)
- Chief Justice of Japan: Saburo Tokura
- Speaker of the House of Representatives
  - Hiroyuki Hosoda (until October 20)
  - Fukushiro Nukaga (starting October 20)
- President of the House of Councillors: Hidehisa Otsuji

=== Governors ===
- Aichi Prefecture: Hideaki Omura
- Akita Prefecture: Norihisa Satake
- Aomori Prefecture: Shingo Mimura (until June 28), Sōichirō Miyashita, (from June 29)
- Chiba Prefecture: Toshihito Kumagai
- Ehime Prefecture: Tokihiro Nakamura
- Fukui Prefecture: Tatsuji Sugimoto
- Fukuoka Prefecture: Seitaro Hattori
- Fukushima Prefecture: Masao Uchibori
- Gifu Prefecture: Hajime Furuta
- Gunma Prefecture: Ichita Yamamoto
- Hiroshima Prefecture: Hidehiko Yuzaki
- Hokkaido: Naomichi Suzuki
- Hyogo Prefecture: Motohiko Saitō
- Ibaraki Prefecture: Kazuhiko Ōigawa
- Ishikawa: Masanori Tanimoto
- Iwate Prefecture: Takuya Tasso
- Kagawa Prefecture: Keizō Hamada
- Kagoshima Prefecture: Kōichi Shiota
- Kanagawa Prefecture: Yuji Kuroiwa
- Kumamoto Prefecture: Ikuo Kabashima
- Kochi Prefecture: Seiji Hamada
- Kyoto Prefecture: Takatoshi Nishiwaki
- Mie Prefecture: Eikei Suzuki
- Miyagi Prefecture: Yoshihiro Murai
- Miyazaki Prefecture: Shunji Kōno
- Nagano Prefecture: Shuichi Abe
- Nagasaki Prefecture: Hōdō Nakamura
- Nara Prefecture: Shōgo Arai (until May 2), Makoto Yamashita (from May 3)
- Niigata Prefecture: Hideyo Hanazumi
- Oita Prefecture: Katsusada Hirose (until April 27), Kiichiro Satō (from April 28)
- Okayama Prefecture: Ryuta Ibaragi
- Okinawa Prefecture: Denny Tamaki
- Osaka Prefecture: Hirofumi Yoshimura
- Saga Prefecture: Yoshinori Yamaguchi
- Saitama Prefecture: Motohiro Ōno
- Shiga Prefecture: Taizō Mikazuki
- Shimame Prefecture: Tatsuya Maruyama
- Shizuoka Prefecture: Heita Kawakatsu
- Tochigi Prefecture: Tomikazu Fukuda
- Tokushima Prefecture: Kamon Iizumi (until May 17), Masazumi Gotoda (from May 18)
- Tokyo Prefecture: Yuriko Koike
- Tottori Prefecture: Shinji Hirai
- Toyama Prefecture: Hachiro Nitta
- Wakayama Prefecture: Shūhei Kishimoto
- Yamagata Prefecture: Mieko Yoshimura
- Yamaguchi Prefecture: Tsugumasa Muraoka
- Yamanashi Prefecture: Kotaro Nagasaki

== Events ==
=== January ===
- January 1–March 28 – The Ministry of Agriculture, Forestry and Fisheries releases a report stating that the Japanese Self-Defence Forces had culled 9.9 million chickens in 2023 to prevent the bird flu and they found 83 infected corpses.
- January 13 – Tetsuya Yamagami is indicted for the assassination of former Japanese Prime Minister Shinzo Abe on July 8, 2023.
- January 19 – The Tokyo Institute of Technology and the Tokyo Medical and Dental University announce a merger to form the Tokyo Institute Science University, to be completed in April 2024.
- January 20 – The Bank of Japan reported that inflation in Japan increased by 4.0% in December 2022, the highest recorded increase since 1981.
- January 22 – Four people were killed, and three others were found unconscious in an apartment fire in Kobe.
- January 25 – A Hong Kong-registered ship carrying 22 people capsized off the waters of Japan. 13 crew members were rescued, with two reported dead and nine reported missing.
- January 29 – A 17-year-old student was filmed licking soy sauce bottles in the sushi chain Sushiro. Outrage spreads across Japan, starting a series of pranks across the country referred to as "sushi terrorism".

=== February ===
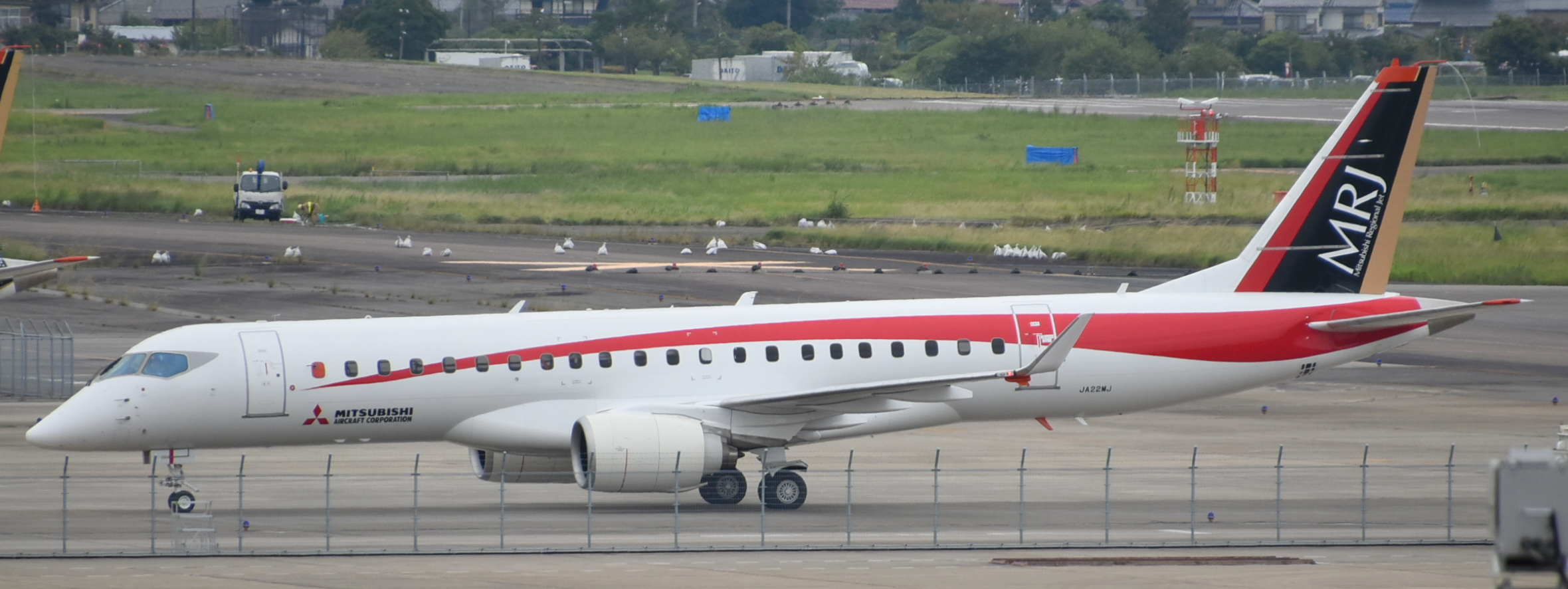
Mitsubishi SpaceJet complete withdraw announcement on February 7

- February 3 – An Executive Secretary to the Prime Minister of Fumio Kishida, Masayoshi Arai says, "I would not want to live next to, or look at the homosexual. If same-sex marriage were legalized, some people would abandon their country". He is fired the following day.
- February 6 – Mitsubishi Aircraft announces they have completely withdrawn from the manufacture, sales, and development of the Mitsubishi SpaceJet.

=== March ===
- March 15 – YouTuber and former MP Yoshikazu Higashitani is expelled from the House of Councillors for never attending parliament. An arrest warrant was requested for him the following day.

=== April ===
- April 1 – All cyclists are obliged to make an effort to wear helmets.
- April 6 – A JSDF Mitsubishi UH-60JA helicopter crashes off the coast of Miyakojima in Okinawa Prefecture with 10 people on board.
- April 13 – North Korea launches a ballistic missile toward northern Japan, prompting evacuation orders in Hokkaido.
- April 15 – An assassination attempt is made on Japanese Prime Minister Fumio Kishida when what was described as a "smoke bomb" was thrown in his direction, while he was giving a speech in Wakayama. Despite the bomb's detonation, Kishida is unharmed.

=== May ===
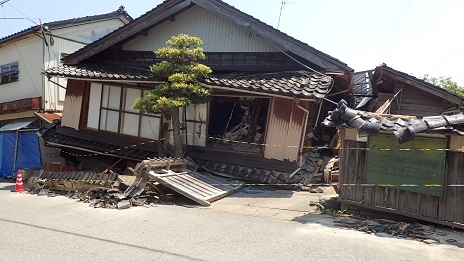
A damage at 2023 Ishikawa earthquake

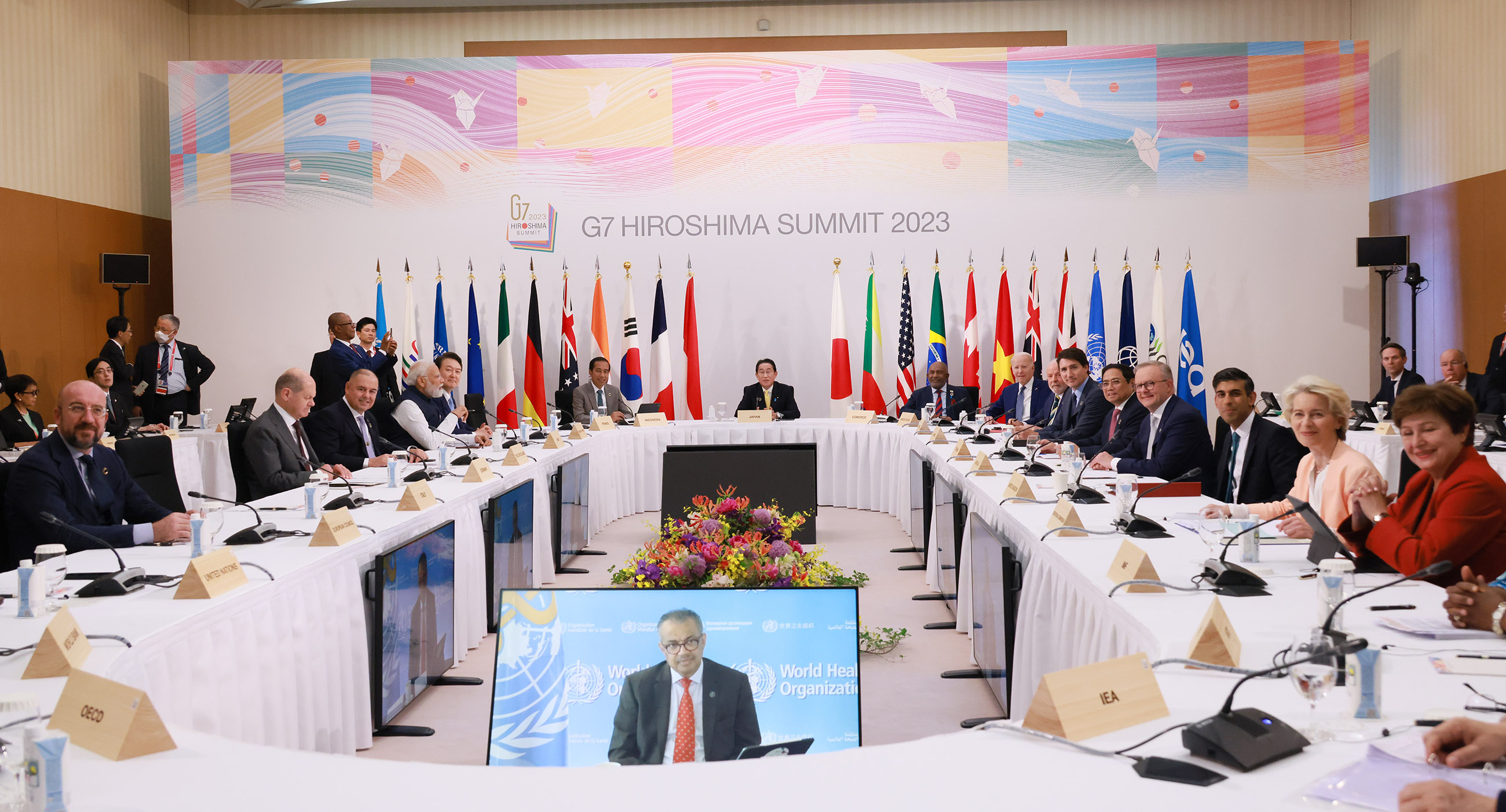
A members attend to general meeting on 2023 G7 Summit in Japan

- May 5 – 2023 Ishikawa earthquake. A magnitude 6.2 earthquake hits the Noto Peninsula, Ishikawa Prefecture, killing one person and injuring 48 others.
- May 11 – A magnitude 5.2 earthquake hits the Tokyo Metropolitan area, injuring nine people.
- May 19 to 21 – 49th G7 summit in Hiroshima.
- May 25 – Four people including two policemen are killed in a stabbing and shooting incident in Nakano.

=== June ===
- June–September – 2023 Japanese heatwaves, according to 2024 Ministry of Health, Laqbour and Welfare Vital Statistics Report edition, 1,651 persons were human fatalities by heatwave in nationwide.
- June 2–3 – Torrential rain from Typhoon Mawar causes a flash flood, a levee collapse, and a landslide in the Tokyo Metropolitan area, the Kii Peninsula, and Hamamatsu, killing 7 people and injuring 45 people.
- June 4 – The former member of House of Councillors, Yoshikazu Higashitani is arrested on his way to Japan from Dubai, according to the Japan National Police Agency and Interpol.
- June 14 – 2023 Japan military facility shooting
- June 16 – The Japanese Diet passes the LGBT Understanding Promotion Act, raises the age of consent from 13 to 16, and criminalizes voyeurism.
- June 18 – A bus and a truck carrying livestock collide in Yakumo, Hokkaido with five fatalities and twelve injuries.
- June 23 – According to a report by the World Health Organization, a patient who died of myocarditis in June 2022 was confirmed as the first case of the Oz virus in the world based on the results from the Japan National Institute of Infectious Diseases.

=== July ===
- July 4 – The UN's nuclear watchdog approves plans to release water from Fukushima Daiichi nuclear power plant into the ocean.
- 11 July – Floods and mudslides kill at least six people in southwestern Japan and injure nineteen more. Five others are reported missing.
- July 14 – An explosion occurs during the test of solid fuel Epsilon rocket at JAXA's Noshiro Testing Center in Noshiro, Akita Prefecture. No injuries are reported.
- July 15–16 – Heavy rain causes flooding, levee breaches, and landslides across Akita Prefecture, killing one person and injuring four others.

=== August ===
- August 1 to 9 – Typhoon Khanun hits the Sakishima Islands, Okinawa Island, killing one person and wounding 91 people.
- August 15 – Torrential rain from Typhoon Lan causes a levee collapse which injures 66 persons mainly around Fukuchiyama, Tottori City.
- August 24 – According to a Japanese government official announcement, and despite opposition from environmental activists and government officials in neighboring countries, discharge of radioactive water from the Fukushima Daiichi Power Plant into the Pacific Ocean starts. The Chinese government announces a prohibition on all fish imports from Japan the same day.
- August 26 – Utsunomiya Light Rail, officially starts operating in Tochigi Prefecture, the first new tram in Japan in 75 years.

=== September ===
- September 4 – The Supreme Court of Japan formally orders Okinawa to allow the United States Armed Forces to expand its runways and military infrastructure on the island despite protests from the locals who oppose the American military's presence.
- September 8–9 – Heavy rain from Tropical Storm Yunyeung leads to a flash flood and a levee collapse in Iwaki, Kitaibaraki and Boso Peninsula. There is one fatality and 21 injuries.
- September 13 – Japanese Prime Minister Fumio Kishida announces the second reshuffling of his cabinet.
- September 29 – K-Arena Yokohama, a major concert hall in Tokyo Metropolitan area, opens in Nishi-ku, Yokohama.

=== October ===
- October 2 – Entertainment giant Johnny & Associates changes its name to Smile-Up and spins off the talent agency as Starto.
- October 7 – Four climbers on Mount Asahi, Nasu, Tochigi Prefecture die due to sudden weather changes.
- October 25 – The Supreme Court of Japan rules that requiring sterilization as part of gender transitioning is unconstitutional, but sends the gender-affirming surgery requirement back to a lower court.
- October 30 – Japan suspends the pilot experiment of its first fully autonomous self-driving car following a minor collision.
- October 31 – Two men at a hospital are injured by gunshots at a hospital and two post office employees are held hostage in Warabi, Saitama Prefecture. One hostage is released and the other escapes without injuries. An 86-year-old man is arrested inside the post office.

=== November ===
- November 4 – Japanese Prime Minister Fumio Kishida visits the Philippines and meets Philippine President Bongbong Marcos, and addresses a joint session of the Philippine Congress.
- November 5 – Japanese Prime Minister Fumio Kishida visits Malaysia and meets Malaysian Prime Minister Anwar Ibrahim.
  - 2023 Japan Series: In Japanese baseball, the Hanshin Tigers defeat the Orix Buffaloes to win the Japan Series in seven games, capturing their second championship, their first since 1985, breaking the Curse of the Colonel.
- November 23 – The High Court of Seoul orders Japan to pay ₩200 million (around ¥22 million or US$154,000) in compensation to 16 women who were comfort women during World War II, overturning a previous ruling that denied the women's claims due to sovereign immunity.
- November 29 – A United States Air Force V-22 Osprey crashes off the coast of Japan's Kagoshima Prefecture with eight crew members on board. A search and rescue operation is launched, according to the Japan Coast Guard.

=== December ===
- December 12 – A district court in Fukushima convicts three former soldiers for sexually assaulting their colleague, Rina Gonoi, during a military exercise in 2021, sentencing them to two years in prison and suspending them from the military for four years.
- December 20 – Japanese electronics company Toshiba is delisted from the Tokyo Stock Exchange after 74 years.
- December 26 –
  - Daihatsu, a unit of Japanese automaker Toyota, shuts down all production lines at its four factories in Japan, while transport ministry officials investigate improper tests for safety certifications.
  - The Tokyo High Court rules that the operator of the Fukushima nuclear power plant, TEPCO will be solely responsible for compensating evacuees, while reducing the amount to half of what a lower court had initially ordered, and absolves the government of any liability.

== Arts and entertainment ==
- 2023 in anime
- 2023 in Japanese music
- 2023 in Japanese television
- List of 2023 box office number-one films in Japan
- List of Japanese films of 2023

== Sports ==
- July 14 to 30 – 2023 FINA World Aquatics Championships in Fukuoka.
- September 24 – 2023 Formula One World Championship is held at 2023 Japanese Grand Prix
- October 1 – 2023 MotoGP World Championship is held at 2023 Japanese motorcycle Grand Prix
- 2023 F4 Japanese Championship
- 2023 Super Formula Championship
- 2023 Super Formula Lights
- 2023 Super GT Series
- 2022 AFC Champions League Final (Japan)
- 2023 in Japanese football
- 2023 J1 League
- 2023 J2 League
- 2023 J3 League
- 2023 Japan Football League
- 2023 Japanese Regional Leagues
- 2023 Japanese Super Cup
- 2023 Emperor's Cup
- 2023 J.League Cup

== Deaths ==
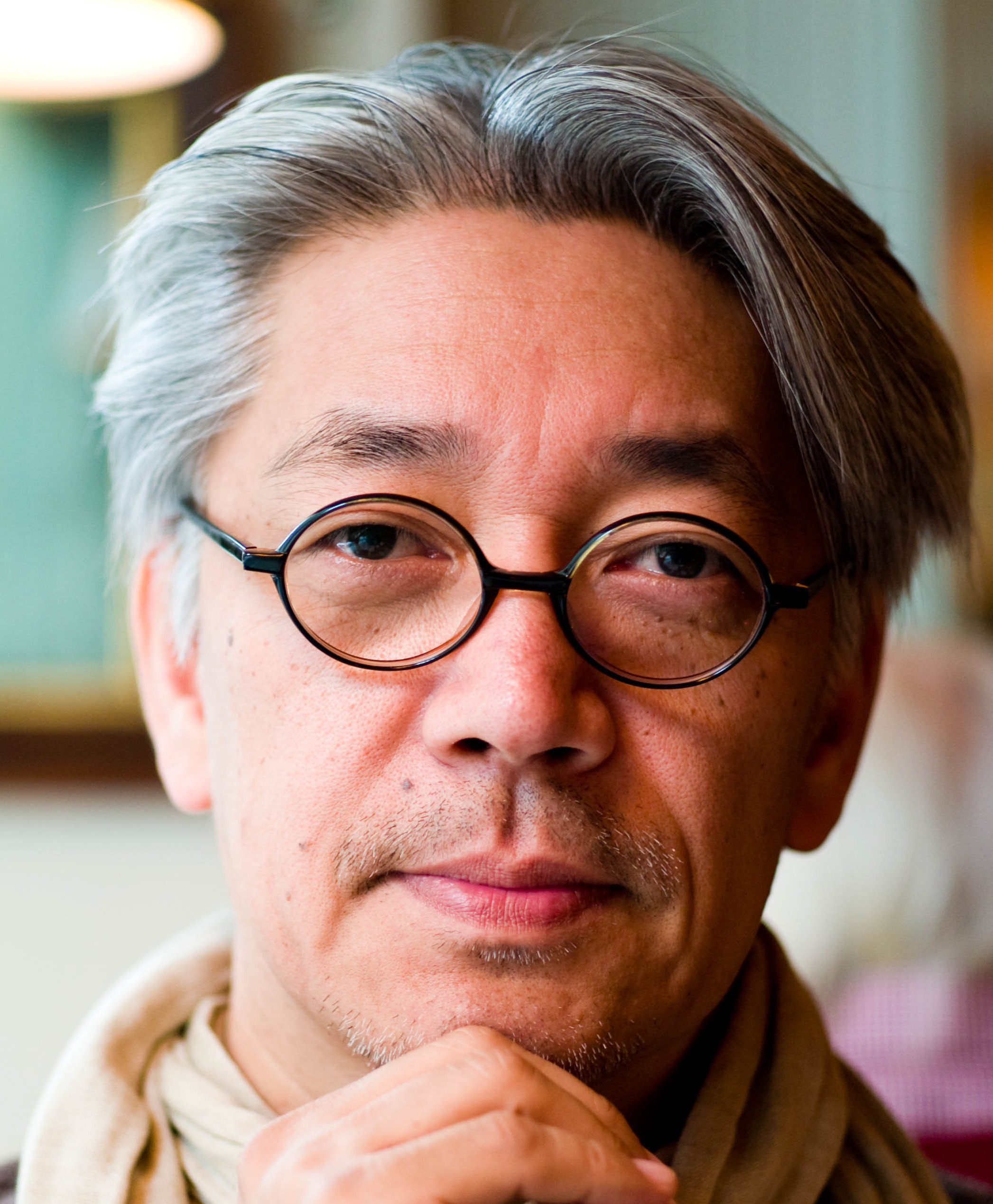
Ryuichi Sakamoto, Japanese composer, pianist, and record producer of Yellow Magic Orchestra, has died of cancer at 71.

=== January ===
- January 1 – Tetsuo Hasegawa, actor (b. 1938)
- January 11 – Yukihiro Takahashi, musician (b. 1952)
- January 23 – Hiromitsu Kadota, baseball player (b. 1948)

=== February ===
- February 5 – Takako Sasuga, voice actress (b. 1936)
- February 7 – Hiroki Nakata, shogi player (b. 1964)
- February 10 – Satoshi Iriki, baseball player (b. 1967)
- February 13 – Leiji Matsumoto, animator and manga artist (b. 1938)
- February 14 – Shoichiro Toyoda, business executive (b. 1925)
- February 15 – Shōzō Iizuka, voice actor (b. 1933)
- February 16 – Maon Kurosaki, singer and songwriter (b. 1988)
- February 25 – Mitsuo Senda, voice actor (b. 1940)

=== March ===
- March 2 – Ryuho Okawa, religious leader (b. 1956)
- March 5
  - Takahiro Kimura, animator, illustrator and character designer (b. 1964)
  - Kenzaburō Ōe, writer (b. 1935)
- March 9 – Chikage Oogi, actress and politician (b. 1933)
- March 10 – Naonobu Fujii, volleyball player (b. 1992)
- March 11 – Chen Kenichi, chef (b. 1956)
- March 15 – Taro Nakayama, politician and former Foreign Minister of Japan (b. 1924)
- March 22 – Jirō Dan, actor (b. 1949)
- March 23 – Tomoko Naraoka, actress (b. 1929)
- March 28 – Ryuichi Sakamoto, composer, record producer, and actor (b. 1952)

=== April ===
- April 1 – Yasumichi Kushida, voice actor (b. 1976)
- April 5 – Masanori Hata, zoologist, essayist, and filmmaker (b. 1935)

=== May ===
- May 11 – Futoshi Nakanishi, baseball player (b. 1933)

=== June ===
- June 9 – Yumie Hiraiwa, screenwriter, novelist (b. 1932)
- June 11
  - Mikio Aoki, politician (b. 1934)
  - Sadao Nakajima, film director (b. 1934)
- June 12 – Shigeru Sugishita, baseball player (b. 1925)
- June 16 – Manabu Kitabeppu, baseball player (b. 1957)

=== July ===
- July 1 – Ippei Kuri, manga artist and entrepreneur (b. 1940)
- July 11 – Yuzo Toyama, composer (b. 1931)
- July 12 – Ryuchell, television personality (b. 1995)
- July 18 – Keiko Suzuka, actress (b. 1955)
- July 24 – Seiichi Morimura, novelist (b. 1933)

=== August ===
- August 5 – Nami Sano, manga artist (b. 1987)
- August 19 – Nizo Yamamoto, manga art director (b. 1953)

=== September ===
- September 1 – Shozaburo Nakamura, politician, former Justice Minister (b. 1934)
- September 8 – Buichi Terasawa, manga artist (b. 1955)
- September 16 – Yukiyoshi Tokoro, manga artist (b. 1947)

=== October ===
- October 8 – Shinji Tanimura, singer-songwriter (b. 1948)
- October 10 – Toshio Naka, former professional baseball player and coach (b. 1936)
- October 14 – Ichirō Zaitsu, actor and comedian (b. 1934)
- October 18 – Yoshinori Monta, singer-songwriter (b. 1951)
- October 19 – Atsushi Sakurai, musician and singer-songwriter (b. 1966)
- October 25 – Yūji Tsushima, politician (b. 1930)
- October 26 – Hiroshi Inuzuka, actor and bassist (b. 1929)
- October 29 – Heath, bassist (b. 1968)

=== November ===
- November 2 – Asashio Tarō IV, sumo wrestler (b. 1955)
- November 4 – Kosuke Hori, politician (b. 1934)
- November 9 – Junko Ōhashi, singer (b. 1950)
- November 10 – Hiroyuki Hosoda, politician (b. 1944)
- November 11 – Masatoshi Wakabayashi, politician (b. 1934)
- November 12 – Kimura Kan (Kan), musician (b. 1962)
- November 15 – Daisaku Ikeda, a chairman of Soka Gakkai and founder of Komeito (b. 1928)
- November 19 – Mizuho Suzuki, actor (b. 1927)
- November 29 – Taichi Yamada, screenwriter and novelist (b. 1934)

=== December ===
- December 7 – Emiko Miyamoto, volleyball player (b. 1937)
- December 12 – Fusa Tatsumi, super-centenarian (b. 1907)
- December 17 – Terao Tsunefumi, sumo wrestler (b. 1963)
- December 30 – Aki Yashiro, singer (b. 1950)

== See also ==
=== Country overviews ===
- Japan
- History of Japan
- Outline of Japan
- Government of Japan
- Politics of Japan
- Years in Japan
- Timeline of Japanese history

=== Related timelines for current period ===
- 2023
- 2020s
- 2020s in political history
