= List of 2023 box office number-one films in Japan =

The following is a list of 2023 box office number-one films in Japan by week. When the number-one film in gross is not the same as the number-one film in admissions, both are listed.

== Number-one films ==
†	This implies the highest-grossing movie of the year.

Week #	Date	Film	Gross	Notes
1	January 8, 2023	The First Slam Dunk †	US$3,640,900	
2	January 15, 2023	The First Slam Dunk †	US$3,340,900	
3	January 22, 2023	The First Slam Dunk †	US$3,168,200	
4	January 29, 2023	The Legend and Butterfly	US$3,838,400	
5	February 5, 2023	Demon Slayer: Kimetsu no Yaiba – To the Swordsmith Village	US$8,788,900	
6	February 12, 2023	Demon Slayer: Kimetsu no Yaiba – To the Swordsmith Village	US$4,313,300	
7	February 19, 2023	Ant-Man and the Wasp: Quantumania	US$3,059,300	
8	February 26, 2023	The First Slam Dunk †	US$2,280,600	In attendance
8	February 26, 2023	Demon Slayer: Kimetsu no Yaiba – To the Swordsmith Village	US$2,284,900	In gross
9	March 5, 2023	Doraemon: Nobita's Sky Utopia	US$4,887,600	
10	March 12, 2023	Doraemon: Nobita's Sky Utopia	US$3,486,300	
11	March 19, 2023	As Long as We Both Shall Live	US$4,988,400	
12	March 26, 2023	Doraemon: Nobita's Sky Utopia	US$2,981,800	
13	April 2, 2023	Doraemon: Nobita's Sky Utopia	US$2,441,900	
14	April 9, 2023	Doraemon: Nobita's Sky Utopia	US$1,540,100	
15	April 16, 2023	Detective Conan: Black Iron Submarine	US$23,473,900	
16	April 23, 2023	Detective Conan: Black Iron Submarine	US$12,037,600	
17	April 30, 2023	The Super Mario Bros. Movie	US$13,387,300	
18	May 7, 2023	The Super Mario Bros. Movie	US$18,316,000	
19	May 14, 2023	The Super Mario Bros. Movie	US$7,846,900	
20	May 21, 2023	Fast X	US$7,199,900	
21	May 28, 2023	The Super Mario Bros. Movie	US$4,507,200	
22	June 4, 2023	The Super Mario Bros. Movie	US$4,105,200	
23	June 11, 2023	The Little Mermaid	US$5,103,700	
24	June 18, 2023	The Little Mermaid	US$2,856,100	
25	June 25, 2023	The Little Mermaid	US$2,376,400	
26	July 2, 2023	Tokyo Revengers 2: Bloody Halloween Part 2	US$4,179,900	In attendance
26	July 2, 2023	Indiana Jones and the Dial of Destiny	US$4,477,000	In gross
27	July 9, 2023	Indiana Jones and the Dial of Destiny	US$2,765,200	
28	July 16, 2023	The Boy and the Heron	US$11,759,800	
29	July 23, 2023	Mission: Impossible – Dead Reckoning Part One	US$7,546,200	
30	July 30, 2023	Kingdom 3: The Flame of Destiny	US$7,393,400	
31	August 6, 2023	Kingdom 3: The Flame of Destiny	US$4,181,700	
32	August 13, 2023	Kingdom 3: The Flame of Destiny	US$4,155,100	
33	August 20, 2023	Kingdom 3: The Flame of Destiny	US$2,159,900	
34	August 27, 2023	Meg 2: The Trench	US$2,957,900	
35	September 3, 2023	Haunted Mansion	US$3,251,700	
36	September 10, 2023	City Hunter the Movie: Angel Dust	US$2,222,300	
37	September 17, 2023	Don't Call It Mystery	US$5,750,800	
38	September 24, 2023	Don't Call It Mystery	US$3,505,400	
39	October 1, 2023	Don't Call It Mystery	US$2,633,700	
40	October 8, 2023	Don't Call It Mystery	US$2,088,300	
41	October 15, 2023	Don't Call It Mystery	US$1,324,400	
42	October 22, 2023	One Piece Film: Red	US$1,060,500	In attendance
42	October 22, 2023	The Creator	US$1,093,900	In gross
43	October 29, 2023	Don't Call It Mystery	US$795,700	
44	November 5, 2023	Godzilla Minus One	US$6,954,200	
45	November 12, 2023	Godzilla Minus One	US$3,689,000	
46	November 19, 2023	Godzilla Minus One	US$2,836,000	
47	November 26, 2023	Fly Me to the Saitama: From Biwa Lake with Love	US$2,784,700	
48	December 3, 2023	Fly Me to the Saitama: From Biwa Lake with Love	US$2,011,300	
49	December 10, 2023	Wonka	US$2,853,000	
50	December 17, 2023	Wish	US$4,302,800	
51	December 24, 2023	Spy × Family Code: White	US$8,597,000	
52	December 31, 2023	Spy × Family Code: White	US$5,576,400	

== Highest-grossing films ==
International film Japanese film

Highest-grossing films in 2023
Rank	Title	Gross
1	The First Slam Dunk	¥15.87 billion ($112.96 million)
2	The Super Mario Bros. Movie	¥14.02 billion ($99.79 million)
3	Detective Conan: Black Iron Submarine	¥13.88 billion ($98.8 million)
4	The Boy and the Heron	¥8.84 billion ($62.92 million)
5	Kingdom 3: The Flame of Destiny	¥5.60 billion ($39.86 million)
6	Godzilla Minus One	¥5.59 billion ($39.79 million)
7	Mission: Impossible – Dead Reckoning Part One	¥5.43 billion ($38.65 million)
8	Don't Call It Mystery	¥4.80 billion ($34.17 million)
9	Tokyo MER: Mobile Emergency Room – The Movie	¥4.53 billion ($32.24 million)
10	Doraemon: Nobita's Sky Utopia	¥4.34 billion ($30.89 million)

== See also ==
- List of Japanese films of 2023
