= Bali Big Brother =

- Poster
- 神様はバリにいる
- Directed by: Toshio Lee
- Screenplay by: Hayashi Mori
- Starring: Shinichi Tsutsumi; Machiko Ono; Naoto Inti Raymi; Nanao; Hiroshi Tamaki
- Release date: January 17, 2015
- Running time: 107 minutes
- Country: Japan
- Language: Japanese
- Box office: ¥45.1 million

Bali Big Brother (神様はバリにいる, Kamisama wa Bali ni Iru) is a 2015 Japanese comedy drama film directed by Toshio Lee (ja). It was released on January 17, 2015.

== Cast ==
- Shinichi Tsutsumi
- Machiko Ono
- Naoto Inti Raymi
- Nanao
- Hiroshi Tamaki

== Reception ==
The film has earned ¥45,070,100 at the Japanese box office.
