= Hiroshi Tamaki =

Japanese actor and singer

- 玉木 宏
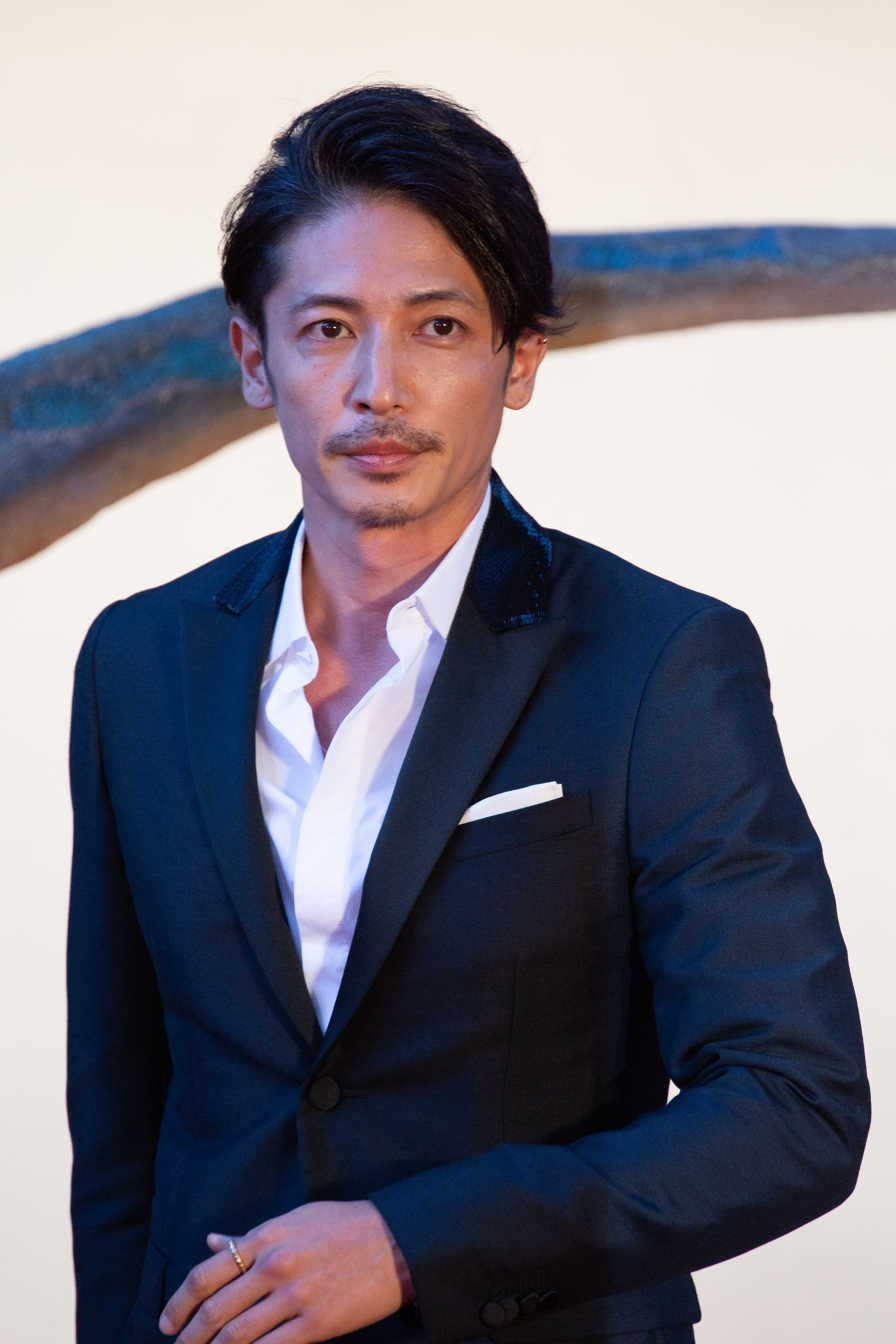
- Tamaki in 2018
- Born: 14 January 1980 (age 46); Nagoya, Japan
- Occupations: Actor, singer
- Years active: 1998–present (actor); 2004–present (singer)
- Spouse: Haruka Kinami (m. 2018)
- Children: 2
- Musical career
- Genre: J-pop
- Instrument: Vocals
- Labels: Yoshimoto R&C; Avex Trax; Far Eastern Tribe
- Website: www.tamakihiroshi.com

Hiroshi Tamaki (玉木 宏, Tamaki Hiroshi; born January 14, 1980) is a Japanese actor and singer from Nagoya, Japan. When he was still in high school, he was discovered by a talent agent while out shopping with friends. He made his debut in the drama Am I Weird? (私ってへん？ Watashitte Hen?) in 1998. Tamaki became better known with his appearance in the 2001 film Waterboys.

His singing career started with the single "Seasons" in the summer of 2004.

He was cast as Shinichi Chiaki in the drama Nodame Cantabile, which aired in Japan on Fuji TV on October 16, 2006. The drama was a hit, and he became most known for this role.

He starred in the revival of the Iron Chef Japanese cooking show on Fuji TV in October 2012, portraying the chairman of the Kitchen Stadium.

He also lent his voice to dub Western productions; for example he voiced Owen Grady (played by Chris Pratt) in the Jurassic World film series and Alex the Lion (original voice: Ben Stiller) in the Madagascar animated film series.

== Filmography ==
=== Films ===
- Christmas Eve (クリスマス・イヴ) (2000), Nobutaka Kosaka
- Waterboys (2001), Katsumasa Sato
- Sabu (さぶ) (2002), Kinta
- Gunjō no Yoru no Umōgire (群青の夜の羽毛布) (2002), Tetsuo
- Rockers (2003), Nobuyuki Tani
- Spirit (2004), Kyo
- Renai Shōsetsu (恋愛小説) (2004)
- Amemasu no Kawa: First Love (雨鱒の川-ファーストラブ) (2004)
- Ghost Shout (ゴーストシャウト) (2004)
- Nagurimono (2005), Anrai
- Henshin (変身) (2005), Junichi Naruse
- Heavenly Forest (2006), Makoto Segawa
- Midnight Eagle (2007), Shinichiro Ochiai
- Smile Seiya no Kiseki (スマイル 聖夜の奇跡) (2007)
- Kids (2008), Takeo
- Nodame Cantabile, The Movie I and II (2009 and 2010), Shin'ichi Chiaki
- MW (2009), Michio Yuuki
- Ōoku (2010), Matsushima
- Princess Toyotomi (2011), Man of Takoyaki store
- Isoroku (2011)
- The Assassins (2012), Mu Shun
- It All Began When I Met You (2013), Christmas Eve Lover
- Time Trip App (2014), Katsu Kaishū
- Bali Big Brother (2015), Ryu
- Detective Mitarai's Casebook: The Clockwork Current (2016)
- Love × Doc (2018), Shunsuke Nomura
- Evil and the Mask (2018), Fumihiro Kuki / Koichi Shintani
- Laplace's Witch (2018), Yuji Nakaoka
- Aircraft Carrier Ibuki (2019), Nariaki Seto
- Hokusai (2021), Kitagawa Utamaro
- The Way of the Househusband: The Cinema (2022), Tatsu
- The Good Father (2022), Shiro Kubo
- Kingdom 2: Far and Away (2022), Lord Changping
- 7 Secretaries: The Movie (2022), Kōichi Ogata
- Black Night Parade (2022), Knecht (voice)
- Kingdom 3: The Flame of Destiny (2023), Lord Changping
- The Silent Service (2023), Hiroshi Fukamachi
- Synapusyu: The Movie, Pushu Hoppe Nyu World (2023), Nyu (voice)
- Golden Kamuy (2024), Tokushirō Tsurumi
- Kingdom 4: Return of the Great General (2024), Lord Changping
- 11 Rebels (2024), Yamagata Kyōsuke
- Synapusyu: The Movie, Pushu Hoppe Dancing Party (2025), Nyu (voice)
- Yukikaze (2025), Kōhei Hayase
- Golden Kamuy: The Abashiri Prison Raid (2026), Tokushirō Tsurumi
- Kingdom 5: The Clash of Souls (2026), Lord Changping
- To You in the Beyond (2026), Takatsu (voice)

=== TV shows ===
- Great Teacher Onizuka (1998), Hamaki (Ep. 10)
- Tengoku ni Ichiban Chikai Otoko (1999)
- Abunai Hokago (1999) (Ep. 7)
- Wakaresaseya (2001), President Chiharu's old crush (Ep. 6)
- Remote (NTV, 2002), Shingo Ueshima
- Shopping Hero (2002)
- Boku ga Chikyu wo Suku (2002), Shinichi Okubo (Ep. 4)
- Water Boys (2003), Katsumasa Sato
- Itoshi Kimi e (2004), Shingo Orihara
- Last Christmas (2004), Naoya Higaki
- Akai Unmei (2005), Shunsuke Yoshino
- Chibi Maruko-Chan (2006)
- Nodame Cantabile (2006), Shin'ichi Chiaki
- Top Caster (2006), Kensuke Kanihara
- Hyoheki (2006), Kyohei Okudera
- Kōmyō ga Tsuji (2006), Yamauchi Yasutoyo
- Teki wa Honnoji ni Ari (2007), Oda Nobunaga
- Hoshi Hitotsu no Yoru (2007)
- Shikaotoko Aoniyoshi (2008), Takanobu Ogawa
- Atsuhime (2008), Sakamoto Ryōma
- Nodame Cantabile SP (2008), Shin'ichi Chiaki
- Love Shuffle (2009), Kei Usami
- MW Dai-0-sho (2009), Michio Yuuki
- Guilty Akuma to Keiyakushita Onna (2010), Takuro Mashima
- Iron Chef (2012)
- Taira no Kiyomori (2012), Minamoto no Yoshitomo
- Wonderful Single Life (2012)
- Watashi no Kirai na Tantei (2014)
- I'm Taking the Day (2014), Yuu Asao
- Zannen na Otto (2015)
- Here Comes Asa! (2015), Shinjiro Shiraoka
- Kyoaku wa Nemurasenai (2016), Tominaga
- Kyaria Okiteyaburi no Keisatsu Shocho (2016), Kinshiro Toyama
- Anata niwa Kaeru Ie ga Aru / You have someone to come home to (2018), Sato Hideaki
- The Way of the Househusband (2020), Tatsu
- Reach Beyond the Blue Sky (2021), Takashima Shūhan
- Tower of Justice (2021), Ren Kamijo
- The Silent Service (2024–27), Hiroshi Fukamachi
- Golden Kamuy: The Hunt of Prisoners in Hokkaido / Karafuto Pursuit Arc (2024–27), Tokushirō Tsurumi
- Last Samurai Standing (2025), Kikuomi Ukyo

=== TV films ===
- Ghost System (2002) – Wataru Higure
- Revolver Aoi Haru (2003) – Osamu

=== Video games ===
- Rogue Galaxy (2005) – Jaster Rogue
- Lost Judgment (2021) – Kazuki Soma

=== Dubbing roles ===
==== Live-action ====
- Jurassic World – Owen Grady (Chris Pratt)
- Jurassic World: Fallen Kingdom – Owen Grady (Chris Pratt)
- Jurassic World Dominion – Owen Grady (Chris Pratt)
- Timeline – Chris Johnston (Paul Walker)

==== Animation ====
- Madagascar – Alex the Lion
- Madagascar: Escape 2 Africa – Alex the Lion
- Madagascar 3: Europe's Most Wanted – Alex the Lion

== Discography ==
=== Singles ===
- Seasons (Yoshimoto R&C, June 2, 2004)
- Emotion (Yoshimoto R&C, November 10, 2004)
- Love Goes/eyes (Avex Trax, February 15, 2006)
- Kibou no Umi/Ame (希望の海/雨 Sea of Desire/Rain) (Avex Trax, April 26, 2006)
- Yakusoku/question (約束/question Promise/Question) (Avex Trax, May 24, 2006)
- Reviver ~Kanashimi ga Mata Kurikaesou to Dareka ni Ai wo Utau~ (ラバイバー～悲しみがまた繰り返そうと誰かに愛を唄う～ Reviver ~When the Sadness Returns, Who Will I Sing my Love to? (Avex Trax, June 28, 2006)
- Odorou Yo (踊ろうよ Let's Dance (Avex Trax, February 6, 2008)
- Dakishimetai (抱きしめたい I Want to Hug You) (Avex Trax, March 19, 2008)
- Slow Time (Avex Trax, April 22, 2009)
- Free (Far Eastern Tribe, May 25, 2011)

=== Albums ===
- Ripple (Yoshimoto R&C, December 15, 2004)
- Bridge (Avex Trax, March 19, 2008)
- Times... (Avex Trax, May 6, 2009)
- Start (Far Eastern Tribe, June 22, 2011)

=== DVDs ===
- Secret of Tamaki Hiroshi "Spirit" (2004)
- "Realize" Hiroshi Tamaki music films 01 (June 30, 2004)

== Awards and nominations ==
Year	Award	Category	Nominated work(s)	Result	Ref.
2007	31st Elan d'or Awards	Newcomer of the Year	Himself	Won	
