= 2023 in Japanese television =

Below is a list of events affecting Japanese television in 2023.

== Events ==
Date	Event	Source
March 7	Johnny Kitagawa, who died in July 9, 2019, has been posthumously exposed for abuse but still revered.	
March 13	Serving as sequels to Yes! PreCure 5 and Witchy PreCure!, the Pretty Cure franchise announced 2 spin-off anime shows for older viewers as part of their 20th anniversary celebration with Kibō no Chikara ~Otona Precure 23~ premiering on NHK-E this year in October and Mahō Tsukai Precure! 2 premiering late-night on TV Asahi next year.	
March 15	The IDOLM@STER Cinderella Girls music composer Hidekazu Tanaka admitted to obscenity charges in court following his arrest on October 24, 2022.	
April 1	During the Sakura Fes event on April 1 (April Fools' Day), a sequel to the Cardcaptor Sakura: Clear Card anime has been announced.	
September 24	The 2023 Formula One World Championship will be held at 2023 Japanese Grand Prix.	
July and September 2023	Original Naruto anime celebrates its 20th anniversary with a rerun of earlier episodes in July and an airing of 4 brand new episodes in September.	
October 1	The 2023 MotoGP World Championship was held at 2023 Japanese motorcycle Grand Prix.	
October 30	As announced by talent agency BaRu, voice actor Junya Ikeda had been arrested in connection with a scam and had been released from his contract with the company as of October 27. Ikeda's character, Oz in The Kingdoms of Ruin anime, is yet to have his voice actor replaced.	

== Ongoing ==
Show	Type	Channel	First aired/Japanese period		Source
NHK
NHK Amateur Song Contest	Talent show	NHK-G, NHK World Premium	March 15, 1953 (TV)	Showa	
With Mother	Kids	E-TV, NHK World Premium	October 5, 1959	Showa	
Nintama Rantarō	Anime	NHK	April 10, 1993	Heisei	
Ojarumaru	Anime	NHK	October 5, 1998	Heisei	
Utacon	Music	NHK-G, NHK World Premium	April 12, 2016	Heisei	
Nippon Television Network System
Shōten	Comedy	Nippon Television	May 15, 1966	Showa	
Soreike! Anpanman	Anime	Nippon Television	October 3, 1988	Showa	
Downtown no Gaki no Tsukai ya Arahende!!	Game show	Nippon Television	October 3, 1989	Heisei	
Detective Conan	Anime	NNS	January 8, 1996	Heisei	
Fuji Network System
Music Fair	Music	Fuji TV	August 31, 1964	Showa	
Sazae-san	Anime	Fuji TV	October 5, 1969	Showa	
FNS Music Festival	Music	FNS	July 2, 1974	Showa	
Chibi Maruko-chan	Anime	Fuji TV	January 8, 1995	Heisei	
One Piece	Anime	Fuji TV	October 20, 1999	Heisei	
TV Asahi
Super Hero Time	Tokusatsu	TV Asahi	September 28, 2003	Heisei	
Crayon Shin-chan	Anime	TV Asahi	April 13, 1992	Heisei	
Doraemon	Anime	TV Asahi	April 15, 2005	Heisei	
Music Station	Music	TV Asahi	October 24, 1986	Showa	
Tokyo Broadcasting System
SASUKE	Sports	Tokyo Broadcasting System	September 26, 1997	Heisei	
Count Down TV	Music	Tokyo Broadcasting System	April 7, 1993	Heisei	

== New series and returning shows ==
Show	Network	Premiere	Finale	Status	Source
Tomo-chan Is a Girl!	Tokyo MX	January 5, 2023	March 30, 2023	Series Ended	
He's Expecting (TV Tokyo broadcast)	TV Tokyo	January 5, 2023	February 23, 2023	Season Ended	
Sugar Apple Fairy Tale	Tokyo MX	January 6, 2023	March 24, 2023	Season Ended; Renewed for Season 2	
Nijiyon Animation	Tokyo MX	January 6, 2023	March 24, 2023	Season Ended; Renewed for Season 2	
Endo and Kobayashi Live! The Latest on Tsundere Villainess Lieselotte	TBS	January 7, 2023	March 25, 2023	Series Ended	
Buddy Daddies	Tokyo MX	January 7, 2023	April 1, 2023	Series Ended	
Trigun Stampede	TV Tokyo	January 7, 2023	March 25, 2023	Series Ended; Sequel series to air in 2026	
What Will You Do, Ieyasu?	NHK	January 8, 2023	December 17, 2023	Series Ended	
RizSta Selection (Note: Rerun series of 'RizSta -Top of Artists!-')	TV Tokyo	January 8, 2023	March 26, 2023	Series Ended	
Don't Toy with Me, Miss Nagatoro 2nd Attack	Tokyo MX	January 8, 2023	March 26, 2023	Series Ended	
Tokyo Revengers (Season 2)	TV Tokyo	January 8, 2023	April 2, 2023	Season Ended	
Malevolent Spirits: Mononogatari	Tokyo MX	January 10, 2023	July 1, 2023	Season Ended; Renewed for Season 2	
Campfire Cooking in Another World with My Absurd Skill	TV Tokyo	January 11, 2023	March 29, 2023	Season Ended; Renewed for Season 2	
Pokémon: Mezase Pokémon Master	TV Tokyo	January 13, 2023	March 24, 2023	Series Ended	
Sorcerous Stabber Orphen: Chaos in Urbanrama	Tokyo MX	January 18, 2023	March 29, 2023	Season Ended; Renewed for the 4th season	
Ultraman New Generation Stars	TV Tokyo	January 28, 2023	June 24, 2023	Season Ended; Renewed for Season 2	
Soaring Sky! Pretty Cure	TV Asahi	February 5, 2023	January 28, 2024	Ending 2024	
Attack on Titan: The Final Season (part 3)	NHK	March 4, 2023	November 5, 2023	Series Ended	
Ohsama Sentai King-Ohger	TV Asahi	March 5, 2023	February 25, 2024	Ending 2024	
Bakugan: Legends	YouTube	March 31, 2023	June 23, 2023	Series Ended	
Mix (2nd season)	Nippon TV	April 1, 2023	September 23, 2023	Series Ended	
Edens Zero (Season 2)	Nippon TV	April 1, 2023	October 1, 2023	Series Ended	
Run for Money: The Great Mission	Fuji TV	April 2, 2023	Currently airing	Continues 2024	
The Dangers in My Heart	TV Asahi	April 2, 2023	June 18, 2023	Season Ended; Renewed for Season 2	
Duel Masters Win Duel Wars	TV Tokyo	April 2, 2023	March 31, 2024	Ending 2024; Next Duel Masters series due to premiere in 2024	
Go! Go! Biikuruzuu	TV Tokyo	April 2, 2023	December 24, 2023	Series Ended (Note: A rerun of episodes of 'Go! Go! Biikuruzuu' aired from January 7, 2024 to March 31, 2024)	
Adventure Continent: Ania Kingdom	TV Tokyo	April 2, 2023	December 24, 2023	Series Ended (Note: A rerun of episodes of 'Adventure Continent: Ania Kingdom' aired from January 7, 2024 to March 31, 2024)	
Ranman	NHK	April 3, 2023	September 29, 2023	Series Ended	
Tokyo Mew Mew New (Season 2)	TV Tokyo	April 5, 2023	June 21, 2023	Series Ended	
Dr. Stone: New World	Tokyo MX	April 6, 2023	December 21, 2023	Season Ended; Renewed for Final Season	
Too Cute Crisis	Tokyo MX	April 7, 2023	June 23, 2023	Series Ended	
Otaku Elf	TBS	April 8, 2023	June 24, 2023	Series Ended	
Magical Destroyers	TBS	April 8, 2023	June 24, 2023	Series Ended	
The Café Terrace and Its Goddesses	TBS	April 8, 2023	June 24, 2023	Season Ended; Renewed for Season 2	
Demon Slayer: Kimetsu no Yaiba (Season 3)	Fuji TV	April 9, 2023	June 18, 2023	Season Ended; Renewed for Season 4	
Sorcerous Stabber Orphen: Sanctuary Arc	Tokyo MX	April 12, 2023	June 28, 2023	Series Ended	
The Marginal Service	NTV	April 12, 2023	June 28, 2023	Series Ended	
Oshi no Ko	Tokyo MX	April 12, 2023	June 28, 2023	Season Ended; Renewed for Season 2	
Pokémon Horizons: The Series	TV Tokyo	April 14, 2023	Currently airing	Continues 2024	
Ranking of Kings: The Treasure Chest of Courage	Fuji TV	April 14, 2023	June 16, 2023	Series Ended	
Sacrificial Princess and the King of Beasts	Tokyo MX	April 20, 2023	September 28, 2023	Series Ended	
My Tiny Senpai	TV Asahi	July 2, 2023	October 1, 2023	Series Ended	
Sweet Reincarnation	TV Tokyo	July 4, 2023	September 19, 2023	Series Ended	
Malevolent Spirits: Mononogatari (Season 2)	Tokyo MX	July 4, 2023	September 19, 2023	Series Ended	
Fe~Renzai -Daily Life of the Gods-	TV Tokyo	July 5, 2023	September 27, 2023	Series Ended	
Sugar Apple Fairy Tale (Part 2)	Tokyo MX	July 7, 2023	September 22, 2023	Series Ended	
Rurouni Kenshin (2023 series)	Fuji TV	July 7, 2023	December 15, 2023	Season Ended; Renewed for Season 2	
Ultraman Blazar	TV Tokyo	July 8, 2023	January 20, 2024	Ending 2024	
The Gene of AI	TBS	July 8, 2023	September 30, 2023	Series Ended	
The Masterful Cat Is Depressed Again Today	TBS	July 8, 2023	September 30, 2023	Series Ended	
Bleach: Thousand-Year Blood War (Part 2)	TV Tokyo	July 8, 2023	September 30, 2023	Season Ended	
Zom 100: Bucket List of the Dead	TBS	July 9, 2023	September 24, 2023	Series Ended; Episodes 10 to 12 due to air on December 25	
Synduality: Noir	TV Tokyo	July 11, 2023	September 26, 2023	Season Ended; Renewed for Season 2	
Lighthouse	Netflix	August 22, 2023	August 22, 2023	Series Ended	
Kamen Rider Gotchard	TV Asahi	September 3, 2023	Currently airing	Continues 2024	
Firefighter Daigo: Rescuer in Orange	Nippon TV	September 30, 2023	March 23, 2024	Ending 2024	
Shangri-La Frontier	TBS	October 1, 2023	March 31, 2023	Ending 2024	
Boogie Woogie	NHK	October 2, 2023	March 29, 2024	Ending 2024	
The Demon Sword Master of Excalibur Academy	TV Tokyo	October 3, 2023	December 19, 2023	Series Ended	
Shy	TV Tokyo	October 3, 2023	December 19, 2023	Season Ended; Renewed for Season 2	
Tokyo Revengers (Season 3)	TV Tokyo	October 4, 2023	December 27, 2023	Season Ended	
Yuzuki-san Chi no Yon Kyōdai	Tokyo MX	October 5, 2023	December 21, 2023	Series Ended	
Beyblade X	TV Tokyo	October 6, 2023	Currently airing	Continues 2024	
Kibō no Chikara ~Otona Precure 23~	NHK-E	October 7, 2023	December 23, 2023	Series Ended	
The Kingdoms of Ruin	TBS	October 7, 2023	December 23, 2023	Series Ended	
Spy × Family (Season 2)	TV Tokyo	October 7, 2023	December 23, 2023	Season Ended	
Girlfriend, Girlfriend (Season 2)	TBS	October 7, 2023	December 23, 2023	Series Ended	
The Seven Deadly Sins: Four Knights of the Apocalypse	TBS	October 8, 2023	March 31, 2024	Ending 2024; Renewed for Season 2	
Protocol: Rain	TV Asahi	October 8, 2023	December 24, 2023	Series Ended	
PokeTsume: Cram Adventures Into a Pocket	TV Tokyo	October 19, 2023	December 22, 2023	Series Ended	
The Apothecary Diaries	Nippon TV	October 22, 2023	March 24, 2024	Ending 2024; Renewed for Season 2 in 2025	
Sexy Tanaka-san	Nippon TV	October 22, 2023	December 24, 2023	Series Ended (Note: Following the controversy on January 26, 2024, Manga artist Hinako Ashihara, the original creator of Sexy Tanaka-san, took her own life 3 days later on January 29, 2024)	

== Ending ==
End date	Show	Channel	First aired	Replaced by	Source
January 21	Ultraman Decker	TV Tokyo	July 9, 2022	Ultraman New Generation Stars	
January 29	Delicious Party Pretty Cure	TV Asahi	February 6, 2022	Soaring Sky! Pretty Cure	
February 26	Avataro Sentai Donbrothers	TV Asahi	March 6, 2022	Ohsama Sentai King-Ohger	
March 8	Uncle from Another World	AT-X	July 6, 2022 (Note: Restarted broadcast on October 6, 2022)	TBA	
March 23	AKB48 Sayonara Mōri-san	Nippon TV	April 8, 2022	OUT OF 48	
March 24	Pokémon: Mezase Pokémon Master	TV Tokyo	January 13, 2023	Pokémon Horizons: The Series	
March 25	My Hero Academia (Season 6)	Nippon TV	October 1, 2022	Mix (2nd season)	
March 25	Endo and Kobayashi Live! The Latest on Tsundere Villainess Lieselotte	TBS	January 7, 2023	Magical Destroyers	
March 26	Boruto: Naruto Next Generations	TV Tokyo	April 5, 2017	Bleach: Thousand-Year Blood War (Note: This is a repeat of this anime series' first cour)	
March 26	Digimon Ghost Game	Fuji TV	October 3, 2021	Run for Money: The Great Mission	
March 26	Cap Kakumei Bottleman DX	TV Osaka	April 3, 2022	SNS Discovery Adventure Foromi & Tadami	
March 26	Blue Lock	TV Asahi	October 8, 2022	The Dangers in My Heart	
March 26	RizSta Selection (Note: This is a rerun of some of the 'RizSta -Top of Artists!-' episodes)	TV Tokyo	January 8, 2023	Beast Wars: Transformers (Note: This is a rerun of the 'Beast Wars: Transformers' Japanese dub)	
March 26	RizSta Selection	TV Tokyo	January 8, 2023	Go! Go! Biikuruzuu	
March 26	RizSta Selection	TV Tokyo	January 8, 2023	Adventure Continent: Ania Kingdom	
March 31	Maiagare!	NHK	October 3, 2022	Ranman	
March 31	Yo-kai Watch (2021 series)	TV Tokyo	April 9, 2021	Spy × Family (Season 1) (Note: This is a rerun of the Spy × Family anime's first season from April 14 to September 29 before being replaced in initial timeslot by Beyblade X)	
April 1	Tamori Club	TV Asahi	October 8, 1982	Kazushige Degawa Horan☆Fushigi no Kai	
June 18	The Dangers in My Heart (Season 1)	TV Asahi	April 2, 2023	My Tiny Senpai	
June 21	Tokyo Mew Mew New	TV Tokyo	July 6, 2022	Fe~Renzai -Daily Life of the Gods-	
June 24	Ultraman New Generation Stars	TV Tokyo	January 28, 2023	Ultraman Blazar	
June 24	Magical Destroyers	TBS	April 8, 2023	The Gene of AI	
June 24	Otaku Elf	TBS	April 8, 2023	The Masterful Cat Is Depressed Again Today	
August 27	Kamen Rider Geats	TV Asahi	September 4, 2022	Kamen Rider Gotchard	
September 23	Mix (2nd season)	Nippon TV	April 1, 2023	Firefighter Daigo: Rescuer in Orange	
September 24	Zom 100: Bucket List of the Dead	TBS	July 9, 2023	Shangri-La Frontier	
September 27	Fe~Renzai -Daily Life of the Gods-	TV Tokyo	July 5, 2023	Tokyo Revengers (Season 3)	
September 29	Ranman	NHK	April 3, 2023	Boogie Woogie	
September 30	The Gene of AI	TBS	July 8, 2023	The Kingdoms of Ruin	
September 30	The Masterful Cat Is Depressed Again Today	TBS	July 8, 2023	Girlfriend, Girlfriend (Season 2)	
October 1	Edens Zero	Nippon TV	April 11, 2021	The Apothecary Diaries	
October 1	My Tiny Senpai	TV Asahi	July 2, 2023	Protocol: Rain	
November 5	Attack on Titan	MBS NHK	April 7, 2013	Document 20min.	
December 17	What Will You Do, Ieyasu?	NHK	January 8, 2023	Dear Radiance	
December 23	Kibō no Chikara ~Otona Precure 23~	NHK	October 7, 2023	A Place Further than the Universe (Note: This is a rerun of a 2018 TV anime)	
December 23	The Kingdoms of Ruin	TBS	October 7, 2023	Pon no Michi	
December 23	Girlfriend, Girlfriend (Season 2)	TBS	October 7, 2023	Haikyu!! (Note: This is a Nekoma Selection rerun of the 'Haikyu!!' TV anime)	
December 24	Protocol: Rain	TV Asahi	October 8, 2023	The Dangers in My Heart (Season 2)	
December 27	Tokyo Revengers	TV Tokyo	April 11, 2021	Shaman King: Flowers	

== Sports ==
Airdate	Sports	Network	Source
September 24	2023 Formula One World Championship	Fuji TV Next	
October 1	2023 MotoGP World Championship	G+	
July 20 – August 20	2023 FIFA Women's World Cup	NHK	

== Special events and milestone episodes ==
Airdate	Show	Episode	Network	Source
March 31	Pokémon Anime Music Festival		TV Tokyo	
April 7	– Pokémon – Pokémon Investigation Team		TV Tokyo	
December 25	Zom 100: Bucket List of the Dead	Episodes 10 to 12	TBS	
December 31	74th NHK Kōhaku Uta Gassen		NHK	
December 31	CDTV Live! Live! Toshikoshi Special 2023→2024		TBS	

== Deaths ==
Date	Name	Age	Notable Works	Source
January 1	Tetsuo Hasegawa	84	Actor (Kinpachi-sensei)	
February 5	Takako Sasuga	87	Voice actress (Astro Boy, The Genie Family, Danganronpa: The Animation)	
February 13	Leiji Matsumoto	85	Original creator (Galaxy Express 999, Space Pirate Captain Harlock)	
February 15	Shōzō Iizuka	89	Voice actor (Tomorrow's Joe, Detective Conan, Pokémon)	
February 25	Mitsuo Senda	82	Voice actor (Time Bokan, Maho Girls PreCure!, Beyblade Burst)	
March 5	Takahiro Kimura	58	Character designer (Betterman, Code Geass)	
March 22	Jirō Dan	74	Actor (The Return of Ultraman, Ninpuu Sentai Hurricaneger)	
March 23	Tomoko Naraoka	93	Actress (Gō, Nankyoku Tairiku)	
April 1	Yasumichi Kushida	46	Voice actor (The Aquatope on White Sand, Bleach, Naruto), dubbing actor (Hulk and the Agents of S.M.A.S.H.)	
June 3	Manabu Ishikawa	??	Scriptwriter (Yozakura Quartet ~Hana no Uta~, Fullmetal Alchemist)	
July 1	Ippei Kuri	83	Animation director (Speed Racer), producer (Science Ninja Team Gatchaman, Kyatto Ninden Teyandee/Samurai Pizza Cats), co-founder and CEO of Tatsunoko Production	
July 12	Ryuchell	27	Television personality	
July 16	Naoto Asahara	38	Original creator (Fujoshi, Ukkari Gay ni Kokuru)	
August 5	Nami Sano	36	Original creator (Haven't You Heard? I'm Sakamoto)	
August 6	Jun Irie	53	Actress (Papa Survival, Good Luck), voice actress (Overman King Gainer)	
September 8	Buichi Terasawa	68	Original creator (Cobra the Animation)	
October 8	Shinji Tanimura	74	Theme song performer (Turn A Gundam, Heaven's Lost Property)	
October 12	Hisaya Nakajo	50	Original creator (Hana-Kimi, Hanazakari no Kimitachi e)	
October 19	Atsushi Sakurai	57	Lead singer of Buck-Tick, theme song performer (xxxHolic, GeGeGe no Kitarō)	
October 24	Miyuki Ichijo	76	Voice actress (Case Closed, Project ARMS)	
November 2	Haruko Kitahama	86	Voice actress (Obake no Q-Tarō, The Adventures of Hutch the Honeybee, Osomatsu-kun)	
November 16	Hajime Kikuchi	44	Music composer (True Tears, Konohana Kitan)	
December 30	Satoshi Iwataki	60	Animator, character designer (Ghost Hunt, Dororo)	
