= Wakaresaseya =

Japanese businesses that break up relationships

Wakaresaseya or wakaresase-ya (別れさせ屋; "breaker-uppers") are Japanese businesses that specialize in breaking up relationships, often by drawing one of the partners into an affair or by producing other incriminating evidence.

== How they work ==
For a fee, a customer names a target and, an undercover employee of the company then attempts to initiate an affair with or produce other incriminating evidence on the target. Though most often used to gather evidence of infidelity for use in a divorce case, it may also be used for purposes ranging from bringing shame to someone, securing the resignation of an employee, luring away the lover of one's spouse, or breaking up some other relationship.

The cost of retaining such an agency was given as ranging from 500,000 to 1.6 million yen, not including a success bonus of 250,000–800,000 yen.

Owners and employees of these businesses have found that men often make easier targets.

== History ==
The activities of these agencies were first widely reported in about 2000, and in 2001 the TV network NTV aired a drama series Wakaresase-ya. In 2005 there were around twelve such companies in Japan, but the field has grown since with companies offering services through the internet. In 2010 an internet search located some 270 wakaresaseya agencies.

The industry was especially reported on by Japanese and foreign media in 2010 when a former operative of a wakaresaseya agency was sentenced for murder. He had fallen in love with a female target the company had assigned to him. After the true nature of the relationship came to light, she wanted to leave him and he killed her.

== See also ==
- Honey trapping
- Kompromat
