= Yukiya Ikegawa =

Japanese singer and child actor (born 2009)

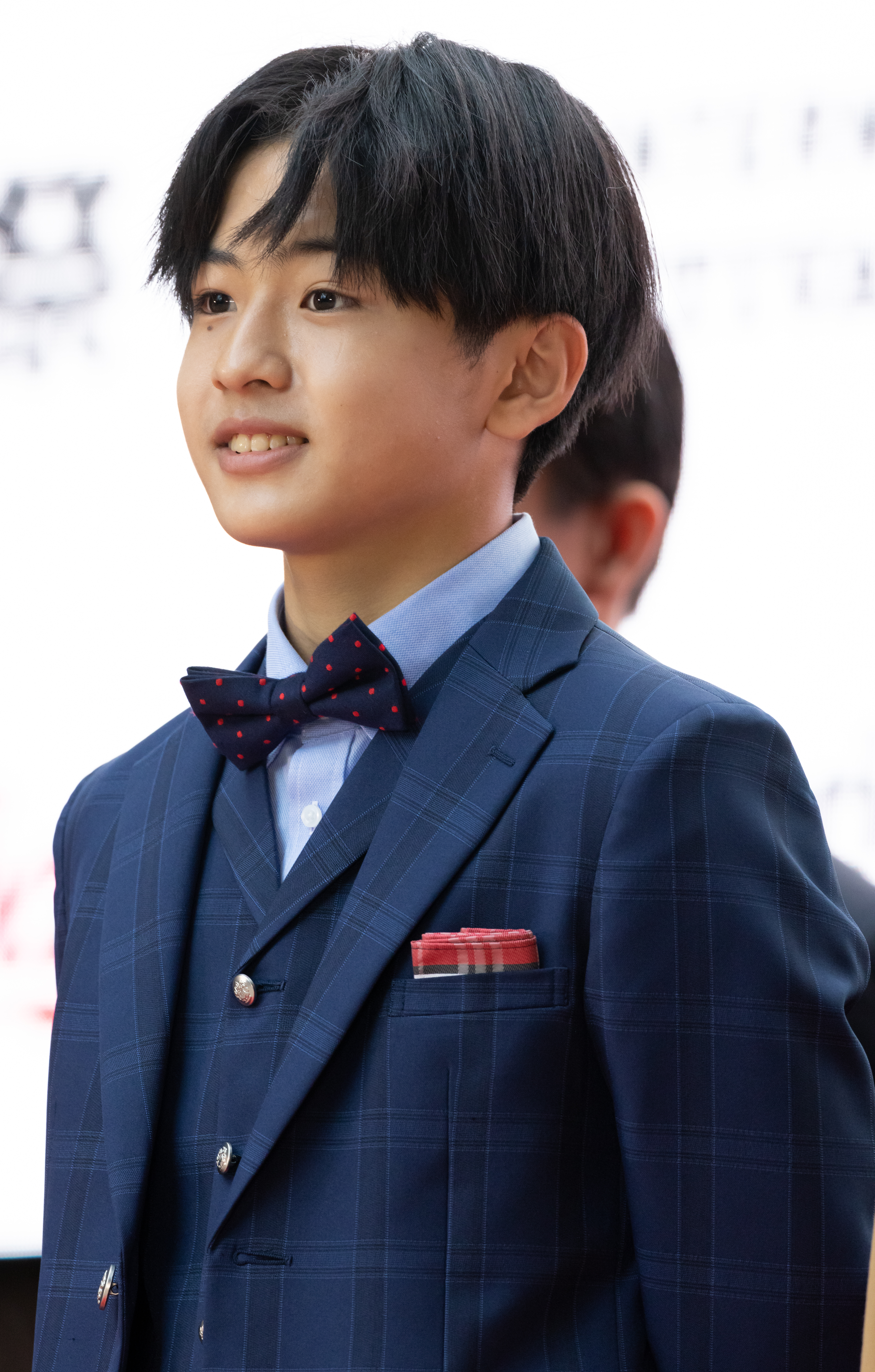
- Ikegawa at the Tokyo International Film Festival in 2022
- Born: January 22, 2009 (age 17); Okinawa Prefecture, Japan
- Occupations: Singer; actor
- Years active: 2019–present
- Hometown: Osaka Prefecture
- Musical career
- Genres: J-pop
- Instrument: Vocals
- Label: Starto Entertainment
- Member of: Boys be

Japanese name
- Kanji: 池川 侑希弥
- Hiragana: いけがわ ゆきや
Transcriptions
- Romanization: Ikegawa Yūkiya

Yukiya Ikegawa (池川 侑希弥(いけがわ ゆきや), Ikegawa Yūkiya; born January 22, 2009) is a Japanese singer and child actor. He is a member of Johnny's Jr. boy group Boys be.

== Early life and career ==
Ikegawa was born on January 22, 2009, in Okinawa and grew up in Osaka Prefecture after his family relocated when he was six years old. He has one elder sister. Admiring Ryosuke Yamada and Shunsuke Michieda, he sent his resume to Johnny's office in the fourth grade, and was accepted in 2019 after succeeding an audition. He then went on to become a member of the boy band Boys be, a unit within Johnny's Jr. that was formed in 2020.

In March 2023, he made his very first starring role as an actor in the movie Brats, Be Ambitious!.

== Personal life ==
Ikegawa is trained in golf as he had practiced it from fourth up to sixth grade.

== Filmography ==
=== Film ===
Year	Title	Role	Notes	Ref.
2023	Brats, Be Ambitious!	Shun Takasaki	Lead role	

=== Television ===
Year	Title	Role	Notes	Ref.
2021	14 Reasons Why a Boy Can't Return to His Hometown	Yukito	Anthology series; episode 7	
2023	Hissatsu Shigotonin	Densuke		
2024	Toshishita Kareshi 2	Sudo	Lead role; episode 3	
