= Nanao (model) =

Japanese actress and model (born 1988)

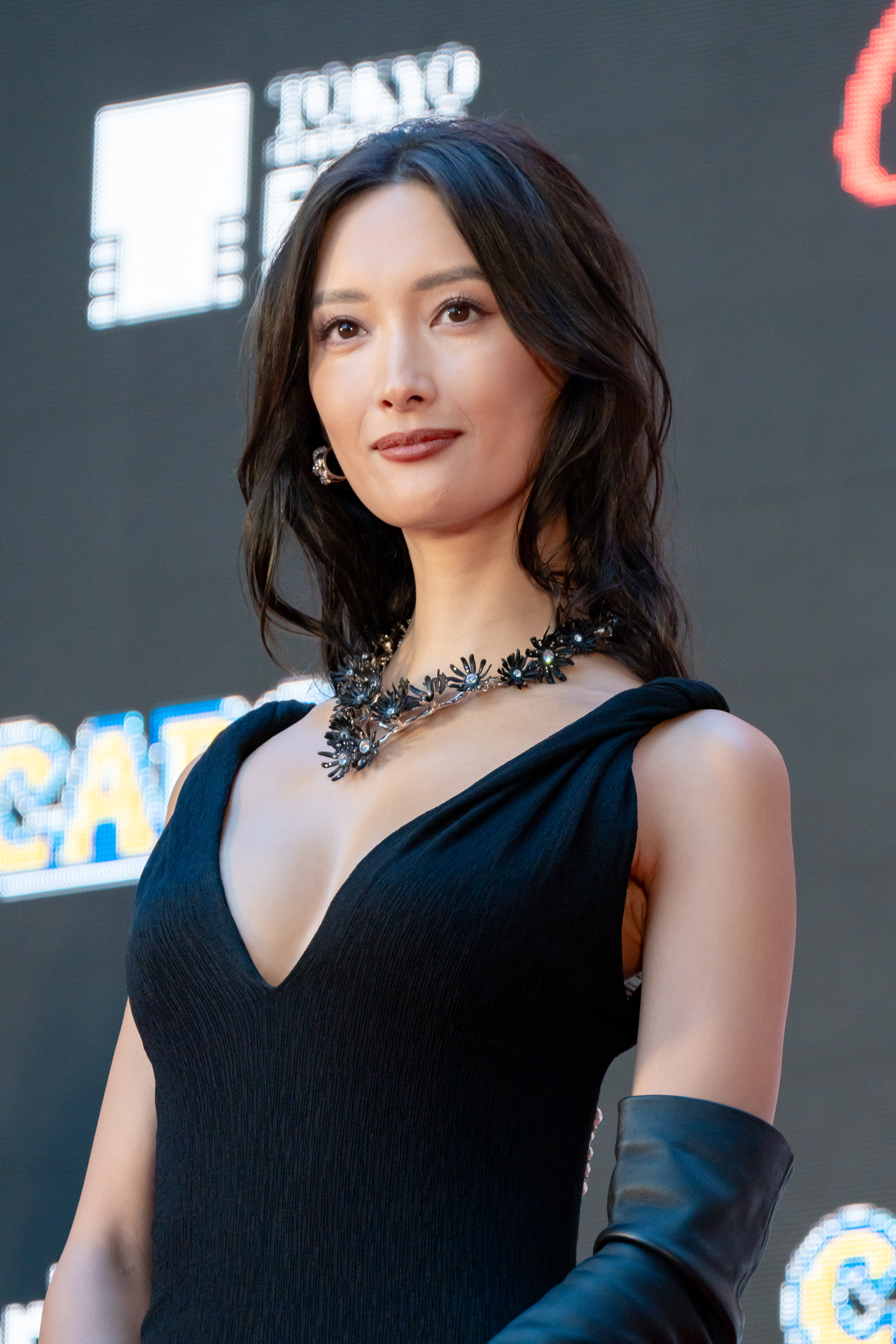
- Nanao at the 36th Tokyo International Film Festival in October 2023
- Born: Nanao Arai; October 28, 1988 (age 37); Saitama Prefecture, Japan
- Occupations: Model; actress
- Years active: 2009–present
- Agent: Platinum Production
- Height: 1.72 m (5 ft 7 1/2 in)

Japanese name
- Kanji: 荒井 菜々緒
- Hiragana: あらい ななお
Transcriptions
- Romanization: Arai Nanao

Nanao Arai (荒井 菜々緒, Arai Nanao; born October 28, 1988) known professionally by her mononym Nanao (菜々緒), is a Japanese actress and model who is affiliated with Platinum Production.

== Early life and career ==
Nanao was born on October 28, 1988 in Saitama Prefecture, Japan.

Nanao began her entertainment activities in 2009 when she was 20. She was a regular model as a martial arts ring girl and race queen in the magazine Pinky. She won the Miss TGC of Tokyo Girls Collection and the 2010 Sanai Mizugi Image Girl and was a fashion model for Non-no.

In 2011, she became an exclusive model for the magazine Ginger. Nanao was also notable as a tarento from her activities. She has appeared in various fashion magazines, television commercials, dramas, and variety shows.

== Filmography ==
=== Films ===
Year	Title	Role	Notes	Ref.
2014	The Snow White Murder Case	Noriko Miki		
2014	The Mole Song: Undercover Agent Reiji	Hu Feng		
2015	Bali Big Brother	Kana		
2015	April Fools	Reiko		
2015	Grasshopper	Hiyoko		
2016	One Piece Film: Gold	Baccarat (voice)		
2017	Gintama	Matako Kijima		
2019	Masquerade Hotel	Eriko Anno		
2020	Wotakoi: Love Is Hard for Otaku	Hanako Koyanagi		
2021	Pretty Guardian Sailor Moon Eternal The Movie	Queen Nehelenia (voice)		
2021	The Supporting Actors: The Movie	Herself		
2021	Jigoku no Hanazono: Office Royale	Shuri Andō		
2021	The Mole Song: Final	Hu Feng		
2022	7 Secretaries: The Movie	Fujiko Hase		
2023	Tokyo MER: Mobile Emergency Room – The Movie	Natsume Kuramae		
2023	Lumberjack the Monster	Ranko Toshiro		
2025	Tokyo MER: Mobile Emergency Room – Nankai Mission	Natsume Kuramae		
2025	Candle Stick	Kyoko	Taiwanese-Japanese film	
2026	Tokyo MER: Mobile Emergency Room – Capital Crisis	Natsume Kuramae		

=== TV series ===
Year	Title	Role	Notes	Ref.
2011	Urero Mikakunin Shōjo	Nanao/Toyomoto 13-gō		
2012	Omo ni Naitemasu	Izumi Konno	Lead role	
2012	Urero Mikansei Shōjo	Minerva/Toyomoto 13-gō		
2013	Lucky Seven	Haruka	Television film	
2013	Last Cinderella	Chiyoko Ōgami		
2013	Miss Pilot	Rinko Suzuki		
2014	Hoshi Shinichi Mystery Special "Teido no Mondai"	Marianna		
2014	First Class	Remie Kawashima		
2014	True Horror Stories: 15th-year Anniversary Special "Ude o Chōdai"	Masami Nakagawa		
2014	Natsu no Owari ni Koi o Shita.	Nanami Takeuchi		
2014	Doctor-X: Surgeon Michiko Daimon	Maya Kujū	Episode 9	
2015	Masshiro	Asuka Hano		
2015	Ghost Writer	Manami Tsukada		
2015	Futagashira	Okon		
2015	Renai Aruaru			
2015	Heat	Eri Yūki		
2016	Kaitō Yamaneko	Sakura Kirishima		
2017	Naotora: The Lady Warlord	Lady Tsukiyama	Taiga drama	
2017	A Life: A Love	Minori Sakakibara		
2018	Miss Devil	Mako Tsubaki	Lead role	
2019	In Hand	Tomoe Makino		
2020	7 Secretaries	Fujiko Hase		
2021	Oh My Boss! Love not included	Horai Reiko		
2021	Tokyo MER: Mobile Emergency Room	Natsume Kuramae		

=== Japanese dub ===
Year	Title	Role	Dubbed voice	Notes	Ref.
2013	G.I. Joe: Retaliation	Lady Jaye	Adrianne Palicki		
2018	Ralph Breaks the Internet	Shank	Gal Gadot	Animation	
