= Lumberjack the Monster =

2023 film directed by Takashi Miike

- Japanese: Kaibutsu no kikori
- Directed by: Takashi Miike
- Screenplay by: Hiroyoshi Koiwai
- Based on: Lumberjack the Monster by Mayusuke Kurai
- Produced by: Misako Saka; Shigeji Maeda
- Starring: Kazuya Kamenashi; Nanao; Riho Yoshioka
- Cinematography: Nobuyasu Kita
- Edited by: Naoichiro Sagara
- Music by: Koji Endo
- Distributed by: Warner Bros. Pictures
- Release dates: October 13, 2023 (Sitges Film Festival); December 1, 2023 (Japan)
- Running time: 118 minutes
- Country: Japan
- Language: Japanese

Lumberjack the Monster (怪物の木こり, Kaibutsu no kikori) is a 2023 Japanese horror film directed by Takashi Miike based on the 2019 Mayusuke Kurai novel of the same name. The film stars Kazuya Kamenashi as a lawyer seeking violent revenge on a masked serial killer.

== Plot ==
The police investigate a series of murders and discover a connection to a group of children abducted and implanted with neurochips 31 years earlier.

== Cast ==
- Kazuya Kamenashi as Akira Ninomiya
- Nanao as forensic profiler Ranko Toshiro
- Kiyohiko Shibukawa as a detective who works with Ranko
- Shido Nakamura as a murder suspect
- Riho Yoshioka as Akira's fiancée
- Shota Sometani as Sugitani, a doctor who is allied with Akira

== Release ==
Lumberjack the Monster first screened on October 13, 2023, in the Òrbita section of the Sitges Film Festival. The film debuted in Japan on October 26, 2023, at the Tokyo International Film Festival, followed by a wide release on December 1, 2023. The film screened in North America on May 6, 2024, in conjunction with the Tribeca Festival Escape from Tribeca program ahead of a Netflix release on June 1, 2024.
