= Synapusyu =

Japanese children's television series

- Genre: Children
- Country of origin: Japan
- Original language: Japanese

Production
- Running time: 30 minutes
- Production company: TV Tokyo

Original release
- Network: TXN (TV Tokyo)
- Release: 6 April 2020 – present

Synapusyu

YouTube information
- Channel: シナぷしゅch
- Years active: 2020–present
- Subscribers: 800 thousand
- Views: 933 million
- Last updated: October 22, 2025

PushBaby

YouTube information
- Channel: PushBaby Official-Baby Songs and Animations
- Years active: 2024–present
- Subscribers: 737 thousand
- Views: 31.3 million
- Last updated: October 22, 2025

Synapusyu (シナぷしゅ) is a Japanese television series aimed at babies and toddlers. It is being aired on TV Tokyo every Monday to Friday morning from 07:30 till 08:00. Shortly after airing on television the episodes are available to view on the official Synapusyu YouTube channel. An international channel, consisting exclusively of segments either in English or nonverbal, was released in 2024 with the title PushBaby.

On May 19, 2023, a Synapusyu movie was released in theaters in Japan. A sequel is scheduled for May 16, 2025.

== Format ==
Each episode of Synapusyu typically consists of short segments, keeping in mind the attention span of its young viewers. The series incorporates repetitive elements, catchy songs, and engaging visuals to reinforce learning concepts and facilitate memory retention.

Some notable returning segments of the show include:

うごくもいもい (Ugoku Moimoi): This segment is based on a popular picture book and brings its colorful illustrations to life.

がっしゃん (Gasshan): In this segment, two puppet cats named Hi-tan and Mi-tan explore the real world to discover and appreciate things that create connections. Whether it's finding objects that go together or recognizing patterns in everyday life, Gasshan encourages children to observe, think critically, and make connections between different elements of their surroundings.

ヒカリの森の黒うさぎ (Hikari no Mori no Kuro Usagi): This short animation segment takes young viewers on a journey through the enchanting forest of light, where a black rabbit lives. The rabbit's adventures in the magical forest spark children's imagination and introduce them to concepts such as nature, creativity, and the wonders of the world around them.

ひらがなさんぽ (Hiragana Sanpo): Each segment introduces words starting with the same character. Words normally written in katakana are written in hiragana.

== Theme Songs ==
Opening song はじまりぷしゅ (Hajimari Pusyu)
Lyrics - Kanako Iida / Composition - Nobuaki Nobusawa / Singing - SANAKO
Ending song おわりぷしゅ (Owari Pusyu)
Lyrics - Kanako Iida / Composition - Nobuaki Nobusawa / Singing - SANAKO

== Movies ==
=== Synapusyu THE MOVIE Pushu Hoppe Nyu World ===
In front of main character Pushu Pushu, who lives in planet Pushu Pushu, a cute fairy appears when Pushu Pushu cleans his mouth with a napkin. As he appears, "Nyu" has lost a cheek, and Pushu Pushu, encouraged by Nyu, boards a rocket and goes searching for it. The two go meeting friends in the various stars they find in their trek.

==== Characters ====
Info

- Pushu Pushu (voiced by Sayaka Iwamoto)
- Nyu (voiced by Hiroshi Tamaki)
- Ukiyo-e (voiced by Takehide Shimakawa)
- Hitan (voiced by Yuichiro Yanai)
- Mitan (voiced by Yuki Matsumaru)

=== Synapusyu THE MOVIE Pushu Hoppe Dancing PARTY ===
This time, Pushu Pushu and Nyu are on vacation. An accident has taken them to Southern Island Acorn, where they encounter taxi driver Party.

==== Characters ====
Info

- Pushu Pushu (voiced by Sousuke Hanatani)
- Nyu (voiced by Hiroshi Tamaki
- Party (voiced by Kazunari Ninomiya)
