= Yasumichi Kushida =

Japanese voice actor (1976–2023)

Yasumichi Kushida 櫛田 泰道
- Born: June 6, 1976; Ibaraki Prefecture, Japan
- Died: April 1, 2023 (aged 46)
- Occupation: Voice actor
- Years active: 2003-2023

Yasumichi Kushida (櫛田 泰道, Kushida Yasumichi; June 6, 1976 – April 1, 2023) was a Japanese voice actor. He started acting in 2003 and, up until his death, was affiliated with Mausu Promotion, with his talent agency managed by Katsuta Voice Actor's Academy. He graduated from Tokyo Announce Gakuin Performing Arts College.

Kushida died on April 1, 2023, at the age of 46.

== Filmography ==
Major roles are highlighted in bold.

=== Anime television series ===
- **2011**
  - 30-sai no Hoken Taiiku - **Ginga Hoshi**
- **2021**
  - The Aquatope on White Sand - **Gousuke Guden**

=== Anime OVA series ===
- **2006**
  - Demon Prince Enma - **Nobusuma**

=== Video games ===
- **2022**
  - AI: The Somnium Files – nirvanA Initiative - Gen

=== Dubbing work ===
==== Live-action television ====
- CSI: Miami
- Drop Dead Diva - Additional voices (Season 1, Episode 5: Lost & Found)
- Frankenstein - Frederick (Ondrej Koval)
- Hotelier - I Shunin (Kim Jeong-Sik)
- iCarly
- Laughing in the Wind - Tóng Bǎixióng (Seung Tsundie)
- Prison Break - Manche Sanchez (Joe Nunez)
- Ugly Betty - **Cliff St. Paul** (David Blue)

==== Live-action films ====
- Ant-Man and the Wasp: Quantumania – Xolum
- Australia – Additional voices
- Big Momma's House 2 – Anthony Bishop (Christopher Jones)
- Birds of Prey – Happy (Matt Willig)
- Die Krähen – Additional voices
- Disturbia – Additional voices
- Lions for Lambs – Additional voices
- Sinister – Sheriff (Fred Thompson)
- The Final Cut – Additional voices
- The Santa Clause 3: The Escape Clause – Additional voices
- There Will Be Blood – Additional voices

==== Animated films ====
- Lego Marvel Super Heroes: Avengers Reassembled - **Bruce Banner/Hulk**

==== Television animation ====
- Avengers Assemble - **Bruce Banner/Hulk**
- Hulk and the Agents of S.M.A.S.H. - **Bruce Banner/Hulk**
- The Avengers: Earth's Mightiest Heroes - **Bruce Banner/Hulk**, **T'Challa/Black Panther**
- Ultimate Spider-Man - **Bruce Banner/Hulk**
