= Tetsuo Hasegawa =

Japanese actor (1938–2023)

- 長谷川哲夫
- Born: 15 July 1938; Shimoniikawa District, Toyama, Japan
- Died: 1 January 2023 (aged 84); Tokyo, Japan
- Occupation: Actor

Tetsuo Hasegawa (Japanese: 長谷川哲夫; 15 July 1938 – 1 January 2023) was a Japanese actor, mainly active on television.

== Life and career ==
Born in Shimoniikawa District, Toyama, Hasegawa studied acting at the Haiyuza Theatre School. Specialized in character roles in television period dramas, he made his professional debut in 1962, in the NHK television film Gōsutoppu monogatari.

Hasegawa was well-known for playing Tokugawa Tsunayoshi for 18 years in the long-running TV-series Mito Kōmon, and for being a regular in the TV-series Kinpachi-sensei, in which he played the Principal. His last appearance was in November 2022, in the stage play Sogetsu Hall de Aimasho!.

Hasegawa died of the consequences of an internal organ disorder on 1 January 2023, at the age of 84.
