= Detective Conan: Black Iron Submarine =

- Theatrical release poster
- Kanji: 名探偵コナン 黒鉄の魚影
- Directed by: Yuzuru Tachikawa
- Written by: Takeharu Sakurai
- Based on: Case Closed by Gosho Aoyama
- Produced by: Shūhō Kondō; Takeshi Shioguchi; Yūhei Okada
- Starring: Minami Takayama; Wakana Yamazaki; Rikiya Koyama; Megumi Hayashibara; Yukitoshi Hori; Fumihiko Tachiki; Mami Koyama; Tōru Furuya; Kotono Mitsuishi; Atsumi Tanezaki; Shūichi Ikeda; Ayumu Murase; Kikuko Inoue; Hiroyuki Kinoshita
- Cinematography: Hitoshi Nishiyama
- Music by: Yugo Kanno (soundtrack); Spitz (theme song: "Utsukushii Hire")
- Production company: TMS/1st Studio
- Distributed by: Toho
- Release date: April 14, 2023
- Running time: 109 minutes
- Country: Japan
- Language: Japanese
- Box office: $106 million

Case Closed: Black Iron Submarine, known as Detective Conan: Black Iron Submarine (Japanese: 名探偵コナン 黒鉄の魚影, Hepburn: Meitantei Konan Kurogane no Sabumarin) in Japan, is a 2023 Japanese animated mystery film directed by Yuzuru Tachikawa. It is the twenty-sixth installment of the Case Closed film series based on the manga series of the same name by Gosho Aoyama, following the 2022 film The Bride of Halloween. The film was released in Japan on April 14, 2023.

This film marks Miyuki Ichijo's final performance as Jodie Starling, before she died of multiple organ failure on October 24, 2023.

== Plot ==
In Frankfurt, a Europol agent is being chased by Black Organization members Kir and Gin. Gin eventually murdered the agent. Some time later, Conan, Ran, the Detective Boys, Dr. Agasa, and Kogoro are invited to the resort at Hachijo-jima owned by Sonoko's family. Conan later received information from Subaru Okiya that a Europol agent is being murdered and a Black Organization agent known as "Pinga" is responsible for the break-in. Having discovered Inspector Shiratori and Chief Hyoue Kuroda from Tokyo Metropolitan Police, Conan sneaked after the two to an Interpol underwater facility known as Pacific Buoy. The facility hosts the new system that allows connection to all surveillance cameras in Japan, Europe, and eventually worldwide. Headed by Yosuke Makino, four other engineers (Ed from India, Grace from France, Leonhardt from Germany, and Naomi Argento from United States) also worked in the facility. Also available is the "All-Age Recognition" system, which uses facial recognition and AI reconstruction of facial structure to identify individuals whose age may have differed from the source material.

Bourbon and Vermouth infiltrated Pacific Buoy and arranged for the kidnapping of Naomi Argento, holding her captive in a submarine. Vodka and Kir then discovered from Naomi's flash drive necklace that the All-Age Recognition system is able to identify Haibara as Shiho Miyano. The same night, Chianti, Vodka, and Pinga kidnapped Haibara from Sonoko's resort. Conan and Dr. Agasa tried to chase after them, but discovered that Vodka and Pinga plunged the vehicle with Haibara into the sea to board the submarine underwater. The incident was reported to Kuroda, and Conan asked to have the Buoy's surveillance capability to check the security camera on the route of the chase and the presence of the submarine, but they discovered that no submarine or vehicles were caught on the camera, which seemingly indicates that the system had been tampered with. Leonhardt tried to confront the culprit, but was drugged and later shown to have suffered poisoning to death in the Buoy's Cafe. The confession letter, apparently written by Leonhardt, also mentioned that he is responsible for the backdoor in the Buoy's system. Meanwhile, Vodka tried to force Naomi to rewrite the All-Age Recognition program, and when she refused to do so, he arranged for Naomi's father, a member of European Parliament that proposes the surveillance system, to be killed.

Later on, Vermouth informed Gin that after running the All-Age Recognition system once again, she discovered that the system is able to pick up the image of a person with a similar face, but not necessarily the same person, indicating that the system is flawed. Frustrated by this development and following order from Rum, Gin decided to use the submarine to destroy the Buoy. However, when he tried to confront Haibara and Naomi, he discovered that the two have escaped from the submarine under the clues provided by Kir. Conan went back to the Buoy and revealed via Kogoro that the person who murdered Leonhardt is Grace. Grace murdered Leonhardt as Leonhardt has examined the access log and discovered that Grace is the only person accessing the camera footage. Grace is then revealed to be Pinga and tried to escape from the Buoy. With the submarine setting to attack the Buoy, Conan tries to light the position of the submarine from underwater and arranged for Shuichi Akai to shoot the rocket that severely damages the submarine, forcing the Black Organization to flee from the submarine. Pinga dies from the blast when the submarine explodes. Conan later loses consciousness underwater, only to be rescued by Haibara who went after him and took him to the surface.

In the post-credits scene, it is revealed that Naomi's father survives the attempted murder, and Pacific Buoy project will be moved to another country. Naomi realizes that Haibara is in fact Shiho Miyano, a friend who shielded her from being bullied when they studied in the United States. The flaw in the system is revealed to have been staged by Vermouth, who disguised herself as Shiho and appeared in security camera footages to disprove the fact that Haibara is Shiho Miyano. An elderly woman whom Haibara earlier offered ticket to purchase Fusae Campbell-branded ginkgo leaf pin is revealed to be Vermouth, who says that Conan must find the reason she helped stage the flaw in the system himself.

== Cast ==
Character	Japanese voice actor
Conan Edogawa	Minami Takayama
Ai Haibara	Megumi Hayashibara
Ran Mouri	Wakana Yamazaki
Kogoro Mouri	Rikiya Koyama
Shinichi Kudō	Kappei Yamaguchi
Shuichi Akai	Shūichi Ikeda
Subaru Okiya	Ryotaro Okiayu
Rei Furuya / Tōru Amuro / Bourbon	Tōru Furuya
Gin	Yukitoshi Hori
Vodka	Fumihiko Tachiki
Vermouth	Mami Koyama
Hidemi Hondou / Rena Mizunashi / Kir	Kotono Mitsuishi
Korn	Hiroyuki Kinoshita
Chianti	Kikuko Inoue
Hyōe Kuroda	Yukimasa Kishino
Kanenori Wakita / Rum	Shigeru Chiba
Hiroshi Agasa	Kenichi Ogata
Sonoko Suzuki	Naoko Matsui
Ayumi Yoshida	Yukiko Iwai
Mitsuhiko Tsuburaya	Ikue Ōtani
Genta Kojima	Wataru Takagi
Jodie Starling	Miyuki Ichijo
André Camel	Kenji Nomura
James Black	Takaya Hashi
Ethan Hondō	Rikiya Koyama
Miwako Sato	Atsuko Yuya
Ninzaburo Shiratori	Kazuhiko Inoue
Juzo Megure	Chafurin
Yōsuke Makino	Ikki Sawamura
Naomi Argento	Atsumi Tanezaki
Leonhardt	Junichi Suwabe
Ed	Hiroshi Kamiya
Grace / Pinga	Ayumu Murase

== Promotion ==
At the end of Detective Conan: The Bride of Halloween, a sneak peek was released, depicting Black Organization member Gin saying: "Oh, I miss you so much, Sherry.", hinting the next movie is about the Black Organization, to be released in Golden Week of 2023.

Beginning in November, the first character of the name of the movie is revealed to be Kuro (黑) through the rescreening of The Bride of Halloween.

On 30 November, it was announced through Issue 1 2023 of the Weekly Shōnen Sunday that the name of the new movie was confirmed to be "Black Iron Submarine" (黒鉄の魚影), for which the Romaji pronunciation of the word 魚影 is to be サブマリン, a homophonic translation of the word submarine. This was accompanied with an overview of the movie and a poster hand-drawn by Aoyama, as well as the confirmation of 14 April 2023 as the release date. The following day, the setting of the movie was confirmed to be near the island of Hachijō-jima near Tokyo.

On 27 December, the first trailer was released, with the character Pinga (ピンガ) being introduced as a member of the Black Organization and an accomplice of its head Rum.

On 1 February 2023, in Issue 10 of the Weekly Shōnen Sunday, the main poster was released. It was split into two halves, with Conan and the other main protagonists in one half and the Black Organization in the other. This is the first time a horizontal poster was used for a Conan film.

On 1 March, a second trailer was released, with Utsukushii Hire (美しい鰭) by Spitz being confirmed as the main theme song for the movie.

== Release and reception ==
The movie was released on 14 April 2023 in Japan in IMAX, MX4D, 4DX and Dolby Cinemas. A total of 504 movie theaters screened the movie, a record in Conan films. On the first day of release, the movie grossed over 850 million Japanese yen (US$6.09 million), and more than 580,000 people watched the movie.

By 7 May, 24 days after release, 7.2 million people had watched the movie, which grossed over 10 billion yen (US$73.7 million), overtaking The Bride of Halloween as the highest grossing Conan film in history, and becoming the first Conan film to gross over 10 billion yen.

=== Critical reception ===
Nicholas Driscoll, writing for Toho Kingdom, gave the film 3.5 out of 5 stars, opining that "even if the film isn't especially groundbreaking nor plumbing new depths in mystery fiction and action, Black Iron Submarine is a good time for young and old adventure-loving cinema goers." Abhishek Srivastava of The Times of India also gave the movie 3.5 out of 5 stars, writing that "[w]hile the film endeavours to do justice to its characters, it occasionally becomes perplexing due to the presence of an extensive cast." Srivastava also noted the aspect of artificial intelligence within the film and that the movie "delves into the realm of deep fakes within the AI universe".

Writing for The Hindu, Aroon Deep noted that the "attentive and probing viewers are rewarded, and the less focused may find themselves at best tolerated by the climax."
