= Doraemon: Nobita's Sky Utopia =

2023 film by Takumi Doyama

Doraemon the Movie: Nobita's Sky Utopia
- Theatrical release poster

Japanese name
- Kanji: 映画ドラえもん のび太と空の理想郷
Transcriptions
- Revised Hepburn: Eiga Doraemon Nobita to Sora no Utopia
- Directed by: Takumi Doyama
- Screenplay by: Ryota Furusawa
- Based on: Doraemon by Fujiko F. Fujio
- Starring: Wasabi Mizuta; Megumi Ohara; Yumi Kakazu; Subaru Kimura; Tomokazu Seki; Ren Nagase; Marina Inoue; Inori Minase; Miki Fujimoto
- Music by: Takayuki Hattori
- Production company: Shin-Ei Animation
- Distributed by: Toho
- Release date: 3 March 2023
- Running time: 107 minutes
- Country: Japan
- Language: Japanese
- Box office: $45.52 million

Doraemon the Movie: Nobita's Sky Utopia (映画ドラえもん のび太と空の理想郷, Eiga Doraemon Nobita to Sora no Utopia) is a 2023 Japanese animated science fiction adventure film. It is the 42nd Doraemon feature film. Directed by Takumi Doyama with a screenplay by Ryota Furusawa, it was released on March 3, 2023.

== Plot ==
Nobita dreams of finding a perfect world, a true Utopia, together with Doraemon and his friends, he discovers Paradapia, an ideal city governed by three sages and guarded by Sonya, a flawless humanoid cat robot. While enjoying their new life, the group is approached by Marimba, a time-traveling bounty hunter, who reveals that Paradapia is actually a brainwashing facility created by Dr. Ray to control people's minds. Nobita resists the brainwashing and helps his friends break free. Together, they stop Ray's plan to control humanity through brainwashing, and Sonya sacrifices himself to contain the collapsing Paradapia. In the end, Ray is arrested, and Later, Doraemon finds Sonya's memory module and uses it to revive him, offering hope for their reunion.

== Cast ==
Character	Japanese voice actor
Doraemon	Wasabi Mizuta
Nobita Nobi	Megumi Ōhara
Shizuka Minamoto	Yumi Kakazu
Takeshi "Gian" Gōda	Subaru Kimura
Suneo Honekawa	Tomokazu Seki
Sonya	Ren Nagase
Marimba	Marina Inoue
Hanna	Inori Minase
Paradapia Teacher	Miki Fujimoto
Delivery man	Ryota Yamasato
Tamako Nobi (Nobita's mother)	Kotono Mitsuishi
Nobisuke Nobi (Nobita's father)	Yasunori Matsumoto
Teacher	Wataru Takagi
Hidetoshi Dekisugi	Shihoko Hagino
Three Sages	Mie Sonozaki; Koji Ishii; Ayumu Murase
Dr. Ray	Ryūsei Nakao

== Soundtrack ==
The theme song is "Paradise" by NiziU, written, composed, and arranged by Akira, Versachoi, and Bang Chan, Changbin, and Han of Stray Kids.

== Release ==
The film was released in theaters on 3 March 2023 in Japan. Vietnamese film distributor Lotte Cinema released this film in Vietnam on 26 May 2023. It was released in China on 1 June 2023, and in Taiwan on 21 July 2023. The film was released by Odex in Malaysia and Singapore on 27 July 2023. Odex also release the film in Myanmar on 18 August 2023. It premiered in India on 4 May 2025 on Disney Channel.

== Box office ==
According to Box Office Mojo, the film collected $37,475,850 as of 19 June 2023.

Weekend no.	Rank	Weekend gross	Total gross till current weekend	Ref.
1	1	¥663 million (US$4.87 million)	¥663 million (US$4.87 million)	
2	1	¥468,105,440 (US$3.51 million)	¥1,248,995,240 (US$9.36 million)	
3	3	¥411,745,170 (US$3.13 million)	¥1,780,000,460 (US$13.53 million)	
4	1	¥392,306,080 (US$2.99 million)	¥2,548,879,730 (US$19.47 million)	
5	1	¥326,477,110 (US$2.45 million)	¥3,296,199,600 (US$24.8 million)	
6	1	¥203,844,380 (US$1.52 million)	¥3,834,595,860 (US$28.74 million)	
7	2	¥126,889,990 (US$943,200)	¥4,004,713,650 (US$29.76 million)	
8	4	¥65,685,000 (US$489,100)	¥4,083,039,050 (US$30.40 million)	

== See also ==
- List of Doraemon films
