= List of Japanese films of 1986 =

A list of films released in Japan in 1986 (see 1986 in film).

Title	Director	Cast	Genre	Notes
A Homansu				
The Adventures of Milo and Otis	Masanori Hata		Documentary	
Castle in the Sky	Hayao Miyazaki		Animation/Fantasy	
Dragon Ball: Curse of the Blood Rubies			Animation/Fighting/Fantasy	First Dragon Ball movie.
Entrails of a Virgin	Kazuo "Gaira" Komizu	Saiko Kizuki	Pink	
Fist of the North Star	Toyoo Ashida		Animation/Fighting	Based on the first half of the 1983 manga of the same name. Censored in re-releases following parental & governmental complaints.
Flashman Movie				
Gonza the Spearman	Masahiro Shinoda			Entered into the 36th Berlin International Film Festival
Guinea Pig: He Never Dies			Horror	
His Motorbike, Her Island	Nobuhiko Obayashi	Noriko Watanabe, Kiwako Harada		
House on Fire	Kinji Fukasaku	Ken Ogata		Japan Academy Prize for Best Film
Inuji ni seshi mono	Kazuyuki Izutsu	Narumi Yasuda; Miki Imai		
Kinnikuman the Movie: Crisis in New York!				
Kinnikuman the Movie: Justice Superman vs. Soldier Superman				
Michi	Koreyoshi Kurahara	Tatsuya Nakadai, Miwako Okamura, Tomisaburo Wakayama	Drama, Romance, Tragedy	
Minami he hashire, umi no michi o!	Seiji Izumi	Kouichi Iwaki, Narumi Yasuda		
Project A-ko	Katsuhiko Nishijima		Animated/Fantasy/Parody	
A Promise	Yoshishige Yoshida			Screened at the 1986 Cannes Film Festival
Robotech: The Movie	Noboru Ishiguro			
The Sea and Poison	Kei Kumai			Won the Jury Grand Prix at Berlin
Sorobanzuku	Yoshimitsu Morita	Narumi Yasuda, Kaoru Kobayashi		
Tokei - Adieu l'hiver	Sō Kuramoto	Ayumi Ishida		
Tora-san's Bluebird Fantasy	Yoji Yamada	Kiyoshi Atsumi	Comedy	37th in the Otoko wa Tsurai yo series
Urusei Yatsura: Lum the Forever	Kazuo Yamazaki	Fumi Hirano; Toshio Furukawa	Anime; Romantic comedy Science fiction	

== See also ==
- 1986 in Japan
- 1986 in Japanese television
