= 8th Yokohama Film Festival =

1987 Japanese film festival edition

- Location: Kannai Hall, Yokohama, Kanagawa, Japan
- Founded: 1980
- Festival date: 31 January 1987

The 8th Yokohama Film Festival (第8回ヨコハマ映画祭) was held on 31 January 1987 in Kannai Hall, Yokohama, Kanagawa, Japan.

== Awards ==
- Best Film: House of Wedlock
- Best New Actor: Tōru Nakamura – Be-Bop High School, Be-Bop Highschool: Koko Yotaro Elegy
- Best Actor: Koichi Iwaki – Minami e Hashire, Umi no Michi o!
- Best Actress: Narumi Yasuda – Minami e Hashire, Umi no Michi o!, Inuji ni Seshi Mono, Sorobanzuku
- Best New Actress:
  - Miki Imai – Inuji ni Seshi Mono
  - Kiwako Harada – His Motorbike, Her Island
- Best Supporting Actor: Kaoru Kobayashi – Sorobanzuku
- Best Supporting Actress: Noriko Watanabe – His Motorbike, Her Island
- Best Director: Hiroyuki Nasu – Be-Bop High School, Be-Bop Highschool: Koko Yotaro Elegy
- Best New Director: Kaizo Hayashi – To Sleep So as to Dream
- Best Screenplay: Yoshimitsu Morita – House of Wedlock, Sorobanzuku
- Best Cinematography: Yasushi Sasakibara – Minami e Hashire, Umi no Michi o!, Saya no Iru Tōshizu
- Best Independent Film: To Sleep So as to Dream
- Special Jury Prize: Saya no Iru Tōshizu – For the staff.
- Special Prize: Kihachi Okamoto (Career)

== Best 10 ==
1. House of Wedlock
2. Comic Magazine
3. His Motorbike, Her Island
4. Lost Chapter of Snow: Passion
5. Inuji ni Seshi Mono
6. Be-Bop High School
7. Saya no Iru Tōshizu
8. Castle in the Sky
9. Jazz Daimyō
10. Sorobanzuku

runner-up: House on Fire
