= List of accolades received by The Boy and the Heron =

The Boy and the Heron accolades
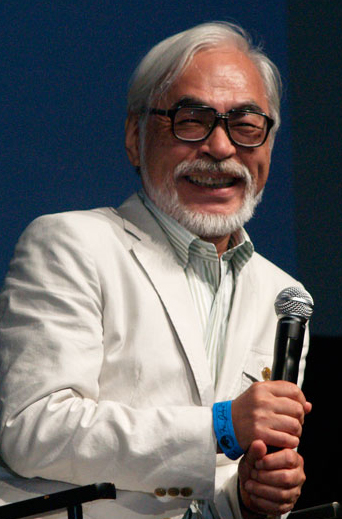
- Hayao Miyazaki received several awards and nominations for his direction and screenplay.
Accolades
| Award | Wins | Nominations |
| Academy Awards | 1 | 1 |
| ADG Excellence in Production Design Awards | 0 | 1 |
| Annie Awards | 2 | 8 |
| Astra Awards | 1 | 2 |
| Austin Film Critics Association Awards | 0 | 2 |
| AWFJ EDA Awards | 1 | 1 |
| Boston Society of Film Critics Awards | 1 | 1 |
| BAFTA Awards | 1 | 1 |
| Chicago Film Critics Association Awards | 1 | 2 |
| Cinema Audio Society Awards | 0 | 1 |
| Critics' Choice Movie Awards | 0 | 1 |
| Critics' Choice Super Awards | 0 | 1 |
| Dallas–Fort Worth Film Critics Association Awards | 1 | 1 |
| Dorian Awards | 1 | 3 |
| Florida Film Critics Circle Awards | 3 | 4 |
| Georgia Film Critics Association Awards | 1 | 2 |
| Golden Globe Awards | 1 | 2 |
| Houston Film Critics Society Awards | 0 | 2 |
| Imagine Film Festival | 1 | 1 |
| IndieWire Critics Poll | 1 | 1 |
| International Cinephile Society Awards | 2 | 2 |
| International Film Music Critics Association Awards | 1 | 2 |
| Japan Academy Film Prize | 1 | 1 |
| London Film Critics' Circle Awards | 1 | 2 |
| Los Angeles Film Critics Association Awards | 1 | 1 |
| Mainichi Film Awards | 1 | 1 |
| Manga Barcelona Awards | 1 | 1 |
| National Board of Review Awards | 1 | 1 |
| New York Film Critics Circle Awards | 1 | 1 |
| Online Film Critics Society Awards | 0 | 1 |
| Producers Guild of America Awards | 0 | 1 |
| San Diego Film Critics Society Awards | 1 | 1 |
| San Francisco Bay Area Film Critics Circle Awards | 1 | 1 |
| Satellite Awards | 1 | 1 |
| Saturn Awards | 0 | 1 |
| Seattle Film Critics Society Awards | 0 | 2 |
| Society of Composers & Lyricists Awards | 0 | 1 |
| St. Louis Film Critics Association Awards | 1 | 1 |
| Toronto Film Critics Association Awards | 1 | 1 |
| Toronto International Film Festival | 1 | 1 |
| Washington D.C. Area Film Critics Association Awards | 0 | 2 |

Totals (Note: Certain award groups do not simply award one winner. They acknowledge several different recipients, have runners-up, and have third place. Since this is a specific recognition and is different from losing an award, runner-up mentions are considered wins in this award tally. For simplification and to avoid errors, each award in this list has been presumed to have had a prior nomination.)
- Wins: 33
- Nominations: 66

The Boy and the Heron (Japanese: 君たちはどう生きるか, Hepburn: Kimitachi wa Dō Ikiru ka; lit. 'How Do You Live?') is a 2023 Japanese animated fantasy film written and directed by Hayao Miyazaki. The film's Japanese title references the 1937 novel How Do You Live? by Genzaburō Yoshino. Produced by Studio Ghibli, the films stars the voices of Soma Santoki, Masaki Suda, Ko Shibasaki, Aimyon, Yoshino Kimura, Takuya Kimura, Kaoru Kobayashi, and Shinobu Otake. The film follows a boy named Mahito Maki during the Pacific War who discovers an abandoned tower in his new town after his mother's death and enters a fantastical world with a talking gray heron.

The film was released in Japanese theaters on July 14, 2023, by Toho. It had its international premiere at the 2023 Toronto International Film Festival on September 7, and after preview screenings on November 22, it was released theatrically in the United States on December 8, 2023. It was generally acclaimed by critics; on review aggregator site Rotten Tomatoes, the film holds an approval rating of 97% from 250 critics, with an average rating of 8.5 out of 10. As of May 15, 2024, the film has grossed US$294.2 million internationally, making it the fifth highest-grossing Japanese film of all time.

The Boy and the Heron received numerous awards and nominations, particularly for its animation and musical score, composed by Joe Hisaishi. At the 96th Academy Awards, Miyazaki and producer Toshio Suzuki won Best Animated Feature – the second hand-drawn production to do so after Miyazaki's 2001 film Spirited Away. At the 81st Golden Globe Awards, it received Best Animated Feature Film, with Hisaishi being nominated for Best Original Score. At the 77th British Academy Film Awards, Miyazaki and Suzuki won Best Animated Film, marking the first time a Japanese-language film had received the award.

== Accolades ==
Accolades received by The Boy and the Heron
| Award | Date of ceremony | Category | Recipient(s) | Result | Ref. |
|---|---|---|---|---|---|
| Academy Awards | March 10, 2024 | Best Animated Feature | Hayao Miyazaki and Toshio Suzuki | Won (Note: After Spirited Away (2001), also directed by Miyazaki, the film is the second hand-drawn production to receive this award. It is also the first recipient to be rated PG-13.) | |
| ADG Excellence in Production Design Awards | February 10, 2024 | Excellence in Production Design for an Animated Film | Yōji Takeshige | Nominated | |
| Annie Awards | February 17, 2024 | Best Animated Feature | The Boy and the Heron | Nominated | |
| Annie Awards | February 17, 2024 | Outstanding Achievement for Directing in a Feature Production | Hayao Miyazaki | Nominated | |
| Annie Awards | February 17, 2024 | Outstanding Achievement for Storyboarding in a Feature Production | Hayao Miyazaki | Won | |
| Annie Awards | February 17, 2024 | Outstanding Achievement for Writing in a Feature Production | Hayao Miyazaki | Nominated | |
| Annie Awards | February 17, 2024 | Outstanding Achievement for Character Animation in a Feature Production | Takeshi Honda | Won | |
| Annie Awards | February 17, 2024 | Outstanding Achievement for Music in a Feature Production | Joe Hisaishi | Nominated | |
| Annie Awards | February 17, 2024 | Outstanding Achievement for Production Design in an Animated Feature Production | Yōji Takeshige | Nominated | |
| Astra Film and Creative Arts Awards | January 6, 2024 | Best Animated Feature | The Boy and the Heron | Nominated | |
| Astra Film and Creative Arts Awards | January 6, 2024 | Best International Filmmaker | Hayao Miyazaki | Won | |
| Austin Film Critics Association Awards | January 10, 2024 | Best Animated Film | The Boy and the Heron | Nominated | |
| Austin Film Critics Association Awards | January 10, 2024 | Best International Film | The Boy and the Heron | Nominated | |
| AWFJ EDA Awards | January 3, 2024 | Best Animated Film | The Boy and the Heron | Won | |
| Boston Society of Film Critics Awards | December 10, 2023 | Best Animated Film | The Boy and the Heron | Won | |
| British Academy Film Awards | February 18, 2024 | Best Animated Film | Hayao Miyazaki and Toshio Suzuki | Won (Note: It became the first Japanese-language film to receive the award.) | |
| Chicago Film Critics Association Awards | December 12, 2023 | Best Animated Film | The Boy and the Heron | Won | |
| Chicago Film Critics Association Awards | December 12, 2023 | Best Foreign Language Film | The Boy and the Heron | Nominated | |
| Cinema Audio Society Awards | March 2, 2024 | Outstanding Achievement in Sound Mixing for a Motion Picture – Animated | Kōji Kasamatsu | Nominated | |
| Critics' Choice Movie Awards | January 14, 2024 | Best Animated Feature | The Boy and the Heron | Nominated | |
| Critics' Choice Super Awards | April 4, 2024 | Best Science Fiction/Fantasy Movie | The Boy and the Heron | Nominated | |
| Dallas–Fort Worth Film Critics Association Awards | December 18, 2023 | Best Animated Film | The Boy and the Heron | Won | |
| Dorian Awards | February 26, 2024 | Non-English Language Film of the Year | The Boy and the Heron | Nominated | |
| Dorian Awards | February 26, 2024 | Animated Film of the Year | The Boy and the Heron | Won | |
| Dorian Awards | February 26, 2024 | Film Music of the Year | Joe Hisaishi | Nominated | |
| Florida Film Critics Circle Awards | December 21, 2023 | Best Film | The Boy and the Heron | Won (Note: The Boy and the Heron is the first animated film in the history of the Florida Film Critics Circle to win the top prize.) | |
| Florida Film Critics Circle Awards | December 21, 2023 | Best Foreign Language Film | The Boy and the Heron | Nominated | |
| Florida Film Critics Circle Awards | December 21, 2023 | Best Animated Film | The Boy and the Heron | Won | |
| Florida Film Critics Circle Awards | December 21, 2023 | Best Score | Joe Hisaishi | Won | |
| Georgia Film Critics Association Awards | January 5, 2024 | Best Animated Film | The Boy and the Heron | Runner-up | |
| Georgia Film Critics Association Awards | January 5, 2024 | Best International Film | The Boy and the Heron | Nominated | |
| Golden Globe Awards | January 7, 2024 | Best Animated Feature Film | The Boy and the Heron | Won (Note: It became the first non-English-language film to receive the prize.) | |
| Golden Globe Awards | January 7, 2024 | Best Original Score | Joe Hisaishi | Nominated | |
| Houston Film Critics Society Awards | January 22, 2024 | Best Animated Feature | The Boy and the Heron | Nominated | |
| Houston Film Critics Society Awards | January 22, 2024 | Best Original Score | Joe Hisaishi | Nominated | |
| Imagine Film Festival | November 4, 2023 | Silver Scream Award | The Boy and the Heron | Won | |
| IndieWire Critics Poll | December 11, 2023 | Best International Film | The Boy and the Heron | Third place | |
| International Cinephile Society Awards | February 11, 2024 | Best Picture | The Boy and the Heron | Nominated | |
| International Cinephile Society Awards | February 11, 2024 | Best Animated Film | The Boy and the Heron | Won | |
| International Cinephile Society Awards | February 11, 2024 | Best Score | Joe Hisaishi | Won | |
| International Cinephile Society Awards | February 11, 2024 | Best Sound Design | Kōji Kasamatsu | Nominated | |
| International Film Music Critics Association Awards | February 22, 2024 | Film Score of the Year | Joe Hisaishi | Nominated | |
| International Film Music Critics Association Awards | February 22, 2024 | Best Original Score for an Animated Film | Joe Hisaishi | Won | |
| Japan Academy Film Prize | March 8, 2024 | Animation of the Year | The Boy and the Heron | Won | |
| London Film Critics' Circle Awards | February 4, 2024 | Foreign Language Film of the Year | The Boy and the Heron | Nominated | |
| London Film Critics' Circle Awards | February 4, 2024 | Animated Film of the Year | The Boy and the Heron | Won | |
| Los Angeles Film Critics Association Awards | December 10, 2023 | Best Animated Film | The Boy and the Heron | Won | |
| Mainichi Film Awards | January 19, 2024 | Ōfuji Noburō Award | The Boy and the Heron | Won | |
| Manga Barcelona Awards | December 5, 2024 | Best Anime Movie Premiere | The Boy and the Heron | Won | |
| National Board of Review Awards | December 6, 2023 | Top Ten Films | The Boy and the Heron | Won (Note: Shared with Barbie, Ferrari, The Holdovers, The Iron Claw, Maestro, Oppenheimer, Past Lives, and Poor Things.) | |
| New York Film Critics Circle Awards | November 30, 2023 | Best Animated Film | The Boy and the Heron | Won | |
| Online Film Critics Society Awards | January 22, 2024 | Best Animated Film | The Boy and the Heron | Nominated | |
| Producers Guild of America Awards | February 25, 2024 | Outstanding Producer of Animated Theatrical Motion Pictures | Toshio Suzuki | Nominated | |
| San Diego Film Critics Society Awards | December 19, 2023 | Best Animated Film | The Boy and the Heron | Won | |
| San Francisco Bay Area Film Critics Circle Awards | January 9, 2024 | Best Animated Feature | The Boy and the Heron | Won | |
| Satellite Awards | March 3, 2024 | Best Animated or Mixed Media Feature | The Boy and the Heron | Won | |
| Saturn Awards | February 2, 2025 | Best Animated Film | The Boy and the Heron | Nominated | |
| Seattle Film Critics Society Awards | January 8, 2024 | Best Animated Feature | The Boy and the Heron | Nominated | |
| Seattle Film Critics Society Awards | January 8, 2024 | Best International Film | The Boy and the Heron | Nominated | |
| Society of Composers & Lyricists Awards | February 13, 2024 | Outstanding Original Score for a Studio Film | Joe Hisaishi | Nominated | |
| St. Louis Film Critics Association Awards | December 17, 2023 | Best Animated Film | The Boy and the Heron | Runner-up | |
| Toronto Film Critics Association Awards | December 17, 2023 | Best Animated Feature | The Boy and the Heron | Runner-up | |
| Toronto International Film Festival | September 17, 2023 | People's Choice Award | The Boy and the Heron | Second runner-up | |
| Washington D.C. Area Film Critics Association Awards | December 10, 2023 | Best Animated Feature | The Boy and the Heron | Nominated | |
| Washington D.C. Area Film Critics Association Awards | December 10, 2023 | Best Voice Performance | Masaki Suda | Nominated | |
