= Kimi-tachi wa Dō Ikiru ka =

Kimi-tachi wa Dō Ikiru ka (君たちはどう生きるか) is the transliteration of these articles' Japanese names:

- How Do You Live?, 1937 novel
- The Boy and the Heron, 2023 film
