= Soma Santoki =

Japanese actor (born 2005)

- Born: June 6, 2005 (age 21); Tokyo, Japan
- Occupation: Actor
- Years active: 2010–present
- Notable work: The Boy and the Heron

Soma Santoki (Japanese: 山時聡真, Hepburn: Santoki Sōma; born June 6, 2005) is a Japanese actor. He had a leading role for Hayao Miyazaki's film The Boy and the Heron.

== Biography ==
When he was five years old, he and his two older sisters were scouted and started working in the entertainment industry.

In 2023, he starred in Hayao Miyazaki's anime film The Boy and the Heron.

== Filmography ==
=== Film ===
Year	Title	Role	Notes	Ref.
2019	Mentai Piriri	Ken'ichi Umino		
2021	Cube	Hiroto Goto		
2022	Lessons in Murder	High school student		
2022	Fragments of the Last Will	Minoru Gotō		
2022	Take a Stroll	Katori		
2023	The Boy and the Heron	Mahito Maki (voice)	Lead role	
2024	Sana: Let Me Hear	Takeru Maekawa		
2025	Under Ninja	Azuma		
2025	The Tales of Kurashiki	Ao Nanba	Lead role	
2026	90 Meters	Yu Fujimura	Lead role	
2026	Blue Lock	Tomoya Tada		
2027	The High School Family	Seiji Kakei		

=== Television ===
Year	Title	Role	Notes	Ref.
2019	Idaten	Young Masaji Tabata	Taiga drama	
2020	Yell	Hiroya Umene	Asadora	
2021	Koko wa Ima kara Rinri Desu	Imai	Episode 7	
2023	The Days	Kirihara's younger brother		
2023	The Greatest Teacher	Yōsuke Uryū		
2024	The Tiger and Her Wings	Toshio Motoki	Asadora	
2025	Chihayafuru: Full Circle	Sota Yono		
2027	The Shogunate Rebel	Fukuzawa Yukichi	Taiga drama	
