= The Island of Cats =

2019 Japanese film directed by Mitsuaki Iwago

- ねことじいちゃん (Japanese)
- Directed by: Mitsuaki Iwago
- Screenplay by: Fumi Tsubota
- Based on: Neko to Jiichan by Nekomaki
- Starring: Tatekawa Shinosuke; Kō Shibasaki; Tasuku Emoto; Takashi Yamanaka; Yuko Tanaka; Kaoru Kobayashi
- Release date: February 22, 2019 (Japan)
- Running time: 103 minutes
- Country: Japan
- Language: Japanese

The Island of Cats (Neko to Jiichan (ねことじいちゃん)) is a 2019 Japanese drama film directed by Mitsuaki Iwago, based on the manga series Neko to Jiichan by Nekomaki. The film stars Tatekawa Shinosuke as an elderly widower living on a small cat-filled island. Released in Japan on February 22, 2019, it had its international premiere at the Fantasia International Film Festival in July 2019.

== Plot ==
Daikichi Haruyama (Tatekawa Shinosuke) is a 70-year-old widower who lives contentedly on a small Japanese island with his cat Tama. He spends his days with childhood friends, among them Iwao (Kaoru Kobayashi), practically the only islander who dislikes cats. Daikichi's son Tsuyoshi (Takashi Yamanaka), who lives in Tokyo, repeatedly urges his father to leave the island and move in with his family, but Daikichi is happy where he is.

The island's quiet routine is gently disrupted when Michiko (Kō Shibasaki), a young woman from Tokyo, arrives to open a café that quickly becomes the hub of community life. A local doctor, Kentaro Wakamura (Tasuku Emoto), is drawn to Michiko and a tentative romance develops between them. Meanwhile, a teenage girl named Asumi decides to leave the island for university in Tokyo, unsettling her boyfriend Satoshi.

After the death of a close friend, Daikichi suffers a heart attack and collapses. Tama finds him and draws the attention of Michiko, who ensures Daikichi receives medical care. During his recovery, Tsuyoshi again urges him to come to Tokyo; Daikichi refuses. When he returns home from hospital, weak and tired, Tama greets him warmly, and Daikichi quietly tells the cat where to find his food.

The next morning Tama has vanished. For three days Daikichi searches the island for him. One evening he arrives home to find Tama waiting at the door with a fish — a gift for his owner. Overcome with relief, Daikichi embraces him. Supported by the island community, Daikichi recovers his strength. Tsuyoshi visits once more and renews his plea; his father declines again, at peace with his life on the island among friends — human and feline alike. In the final scene, Daikichi walks through the countryside with Tama at his side and says, "The best is yet to come, right Tama?"

== Cast ==
- Tatekawa Shinosuke as Daikichi Haruyama
- Kō Shibasaki as Michiko
- Tasuku Emoto as Kentaro Wakamura
- Takashi Yamanaka as Tsuyoshi
- Kaoru Kobayashi as Iwao
- Shono Hayama as Satoshi Uchimura
- Yuko Tanaka as Yoshie
- Guin Poon Chaw as Sachi

== Production ==
The Island of Cats was directed by Mitsuaki Iwago, a wildlife photographer widely known for his books of cat photography. The screenplay was written by Fumi Tsubota, adapting the manga Neko to Jiichan by Nekomaki.

== Release ==
The film was released in Japan on February 22, 2019. It had its international premiere at the Fantasia International Film Festival in Montréal in July 2019, and also screened at the Toronto Japanese Film Festival later that year.

== Reception ==
The Island of Cats holds a 100% approval rating on Rotten Tomatoes.

Writing for The Japan Times, Giovanni Fazio praised the film's visual approach: "Iwago's way of framing the cats is beautiful."

Reviewing the film at the Fantasia International Film Festival, Asian Movie Pulse wrote that Iwago "directs a film that retains a delicate balance between the observational documentary about cats and life in secluded Japanese islands and social drama."

The Reel Bits described the film as "notable for its absence of drama" and praised its "serialised pace of a slice-of-life manga."
