= All Out!! =

Japanese manga series

- Cover of the first manga volume
- Genre: Sports
- Manga
- Written by: Shiori Amase
- Published by: Kodansha
- English publisher: NA: Kodansha USA (digital)
- Magazine: Monthly Morning Two
- Original run: November 21, 2012 – February 21, 2020
- Volumes: 17
- Anime television series
- Directed by: Kenichi Shimizu
- Produced by: Toshiyuki Koudate; Masaki Hayashi
- Written by: Masahiro Yokotani; Shingo Irie
- Music by: Yasuharu Takanashi
- Studio: Madhouse; TMS Entertainment
- Licensed by: Crunchyroll
- Original network: Tokyo MX, MBS, BS11
- Original run: October 7, 2016 – March 31, 2017
- Episodes: 25
- icon

All Out!! (stylized in all caps) is a Japanese manga series written and illustrated by Shiori Amase. It was serialized in Kodansha's seinen manga magazine Monthly Morning Two from November 2012 to February 2020, with its chapters collected in seventeen tankōbon volumes. An anime television series adaptation by Madhouse and TMS Entertainment aired from October 2016 to March 2017.

== Characters ==
=== Kanagawa Prefectural High School Rugby Club ===
Kenji Gion (祇園 健次, Gion Kenji)
Voiced by: Shōya Chiba (Japanese); Stephen Sanders (English)
Sumiaki Iwashimizu (石清水 澄明, Iwashimizu Sumiaki)
Voiced by: Yūto Adachi (Japanese); Justin Briner (English)
Takuya Sekizan (赤山 濯也, Sekizan Takuya)
Voiced by: Yoshimasa Hosoya (Japanese); Christopher Wehkamp (English)
Mutsumi Hachiōji (八王子 睦, Hachiōji Mutsumi)
Voiced by: Ryōta Ōsaka (Japanese); Brad Smeaton (English)
Etsugo Ōharano (大原野 越吾, Ōharano Etsugo)
Voiced by: Kensho Ono (Japanese); Ian Sinclair (English)
Yūsaku Suwa (諏訪勇作, Suwa Yūsaku)
Voiced by: Daichi Kanbara (Japanese); Dallas Reid (English)
Isao Kifune (貴船 公, Kifune Isao)
Voiced by: Takuma Nagatsuka
Shōta Kibi (吉備翔太, Kibi Shōta)
Voiced by: Katsunori Okai (Japanese); Daman Mills (English)
Kōsuke Marōdo (客人考助, Marōdo Kōsuke)
Voiced by: Keisuke Komoto (Japanese); Ethan Gallardo (English)
Tomomichi Takebe (健部知道, Takebe Tomomichi)
Voiced by: Wataru Takahashi (Japanese); Marcus D. Stimac (English)
Yutaka Shinshi (眞子 豊, Shinshi Yutaka)
Voiced by: Takashi Uezumiya (Japanese); Oscar Seung (English)
Taichi Ōhie (大比叡太一, Ōhie Taichi)
Voiced by: Tomohito Takatsuka
Eiichi Hirota (広田鋭一, Hirota Eiichi)
Voiced by: Shun'ichi Maki (Japanese); Cris George (English)
Takeo Atsuta (熱田猛雄, Atsuta Takeo)
Voiced by: Fukushi Ochiai
Shinnosuke Hyōsu (兵主進乃介, Hyōsu Shinnosuke)
Voiced by: Kazuki Nakao (Japanese); Ricco Fajardo (English)
Hirokuni Kasuga (春日寛邦, Kasuga Hirokuni)
Voiced by: Daiki Hamano (Japanese); Z. Charles Bolton (English)
Raita Kamō (賀茂雷太, Kamō Raita)
Voiced by: Masayuki Shoji (Japanese); Jean-Luc Hester (English)
Kōichirō Kashima (鹿島耕一郎, Kashima Kōichirō)
Voiced by: Hiromichi Tezuka (Japanese); Aaron Roberts (English)
Yoshiki Hirano (平野良貴, Hirano Yoshiki)
Voiced by: Daiki Kobayashi (Japanese); Drew Bramlet (English)
Susumu Kitamachi (北町 進, Kitamachi Susumu)
Voiced by: Yūsuke Ōta (Japanese); Justin Duncan (English)
Sueyoshi Mikami (三上季吉, Mikami Sueyoshi)
Voiced by: Yūki Hashimoto
Michio Sumiyoshi (住吉道生, Sumiyoshi Michio)
Voiced by: Kōdai Sakai (Japanese); Anthony Bowling (English)
Taihei Noka (苗鹿大平, Noka Taihei)
Voiced by: Toshinari Fukamachi (Japanese); Tyler Walker (English)
Yuto Keta (気田悠人, Keta Yuto)
Voiced by: Kōtarō Nishiyama (Japanese); Micah Solusod (English)
Toshinosuke Matsuo (松尾年乃助, Matsuo Toshinosuke)
Voiced by: Fuminori Komatsu
Natsuki Ise (伊勢夏樹, Ise Natsuki)
Voiced by: Chiharu Sawashiro (Japanese); Christopher Bevins (English)
Masaru Ebumi (江文 優, Ebumi Masaru)
Voiced by: Taishi Murata (Japanese); Orion Pitts (English)
Shingo Komori (籠信吾, Komori Shingo)
Voiced by: Takaya Hashi (Japanese); Christopher R. Sabat (English)
Umeno Hoakari (火明うめの, Hoakari Umeno)
Voiced by: Haruka Yoshimura (Japanese); Jeannie Tirado (English)

== Media ==
=== Manga ===
The original manga by Shiori Amase has been serialized in Kodansha's Monthly Morning Two magazine from November 21, 2012, to February 21, 2020. Seventeen tankōbon volumes have been released so far. Kodansha USA released the manga in English in a digital-only format.

==== Volumes ====
No.	Japanese release date	Japanese ISBN
1	April 23, 2013; February 23, 2016 (LE)	978-4-06-387208-8; 978-4-06-358801-9 (RP/LE)
2	September 20, 2013	978-4-06-387259-0
3	February 21, 2014	978-4-06-387297-2
4	July 23, 2014	978-4-06-388355-8
5	December 22, 2014	978-4-06-388411-1
6	April 23, 2015	978-4-06-388449-4
7	September 23, 2015	978-4-06-388502-6
8	February 23, 2016	978-4-06-388564-4; 978-4-06-358802-6 (LE)
9	June 23, 2016	978-4-06-388614-6
10	September 23, 2016	978-4-06-388644-3
11	February 23, 2017	978-4-06-388688-7
12	June 23, 2017	978-4-06-388738-9; 978-4-06-510062-2 (LE)
13	November 22, 2017	978-4-06-510517-7; 978-4-06-510517-7 (LE)
14	May 23, 2018	978-4-06-511375-2; 978-4-06-511602-9 (LE)
15	January 23, 2019	978-4-06-514143-4
16	August 23, 2019	978-4-06-516806-6
17	February 21, 2020	978-4-06-518500-1

=== Anime ===
An anime television series adaptation aired from October 7, 2016, to March 31, 2017. The series is produced by Madhouse and TMS Entertainment, with Telecom Animation Film assisting with the production. The anime is directed by Kenichi Shimizu, and written by Masahiro Yokotani and Shingo Irie, with character designs by Masanori Shino and music by Yasuharu Takanashi. Toshiyuki Koudate and Masaki Hayashi are producing the series. Crunchyroll streamed the series with an English dub.

==== Episodes ====
No.	Official English title (Note: All English titles are taken from Crunchyroll.) Original Japanese title	Original release date
1	"This Year's First-Years are Hilarious" "Kotoshi no Ichinen wa Ukeru na" (Japanese: 今年の1年はウケるな)	October 7, 2016 (Note: The series premiered on Tokyo MX at 24:00 on October 6, 2016, which is effectively October 7, 2016.)
It began with a chance meeting... The day of the Jinko High entrance ceremony; Gion Kenji, a first year insecure about his height, decides to join the rugby team after watching the team practice. Meanwhile, a tall and experienced rugby player Iwashimizu Sumiaki decides not to join the team due to a traumatizing experience during middle school. Curtains rise on the mismatched duo's young rugby story!
2	"I Want to Tackle" "Takkuru Yaritee" (Japanese: タックルやりてェ)	October 14, 2016
Gion and Iwashimizu join the Jinko rugby team. Captain Sekizan Takuya imposes a brutal training exercise known as "The Turtle" on Gion, who wants to practice tackling. Gion claims to have learned how to tackle while watching the team practice as he did the turtle and begins training with Iwashimizu. Will Gion be able to successfully tackle the large Sekizan?!
3	"What's Most Important" "Ichiban Taisetsuna no wa" (Japanese: 一番大切なのは)	October 21, 2016
The practice game against Keijo High, one of Kanagawa's top four teams begins. Iwashizumi faces off against Miyuki Atsushi, a friend he accidentally injured during middle school. Will Gion's words reach Iwashizumi's soul as he's unable to take on his old friend? As the fierce battle rages on, Sekizan's determination to win leads him to tackle his rival, Taira Tadakazu!
4	"What Should I Do?" "Ore, Nani Shitaraii?" (Japanese: 俺、なにしたらいい？)	October 28, 2016
Jinko may be making a comeback in their game against Keijo thanks to prodigal first-year, Oharano Etsugo. The match begins poorly under their opponents' skillful assault. In order to change the flow of the game, Sekizan subs in the amateur Gion! Will Gion have a chance to shine in his first match? The match between Jinko VS Keijo finally comes to a close!
5	"What's Lacking" "Nani ga Kakete Imasu" (Japanese: 何が欠けています)	November 4, 2016
The Jinko rugby club's training camp has begun. As the team engages in intense practice, an old man appears and tells them they're wasting their time. The harsh words of former national team coach Komori Shingo leave the team at a loss. Meanwhile, Sekizan asks him what the team is lacking. Will Komori become the savior of the leaderless Jinko rugby team?
6	"Giving Everything You've Got" "Anata ga Eta Mono Subete o Ataeru" (Japanese: あなたが得たものすべてを与える)	November 11, 2016
With their new coach Komori, the new and improved Jinko Rugby Team begins the second day of their training camp. Contrary to Gion's excitement, a fight breaks out between teammates. The first thing the hot-tempered sore loser Ebumi ever became passionate about... was rugby. And because of his attitude, he can't tolerate the lukewarm approach of his teammates!
7	"I Want to Be Able to Do Everything" "Watashi wa Subete o Okonau Koto ga Dekiru yō ni Naritai" (Japanese: 私はすべてを行うことができるようになりたい)	November 18, 2016
For Gion, who joined the rugby team after being charmed by tackling, rugby = tackling. Even during an intrasquad match, Gion neglects teamwork and the basics in favor of tackling and tackling and tackling... Komori has some harsh words for Gion! Gion becomes depressed... Concerned, Iwashimizu tries to cheer him up... Will his voice reach Gion?!
8	"Ball Games" "Bōrugēmu" (Japanese: ボールゲーム)	November 25, 2016
As the members of the rugby team are feeling the results of their training camp, Komori arranges a practice match against Todo-dai Sagami. Their opponents placed second at the Kanagawa prefectural preliminaries... Sekizan is fired up at the prospect of facing just the type of opponent he hoped for! But Yoshida, the team's advisor, calls the rugby team's activities mere "ball games." Jinko versus Sagami... Will Yoshida see ball games or something more?!
9	"You've Gotten Stronger" "Anata wa Yori Tsuyoku Natta" (Japanese: あなたはより強くなった)	December 2, 2016
10	"I Ate Too Much Shaved Ice" "Chotto Kakigoori Tabesugi te" (Japanese: ちょっとかき氷食べ過ぎて)	December 9, 2016
11	"You Have No Feel for the Game" "Sensu nē n da yo" (Japanese: センスねェんだよ)	December 16, 2016
12	"Joint Practice!" "Gōdō renshū" (Japanese: 合同練習)	December 23, 2016
13	"Let's Go to Ryogoku Together" "Issho ni ryōkoku o mezasou" (Japanese: 一緒に両国を目指そう)	January 6, 2017
14	"X Day" "Xdei" (Japanese: Xデイ)	January 13, 2017
15	"Teammate" "Chīmumeito" (Japanese: チームメイト)	January 20, 2017
16	"You've Prepared" "Omaera wa junbi shite kita" (Japanese: お前らは準備してきた)	January 27, 2017
17	"Summer Training Camp" "Natsu gasshuku" (Japanese: 夏合宿)	February 3, 2017
18	"Study" "Manabe" (Japanese: 学べ)	February 10, 2017
19	"I'm Not Crying" "Nai te neeyo" (Japanese: 泣いてねーよ)	February 17, 2017
20	"Aren't You Happy?" "Ureshiku neeno ka?" (Japanese: 嬉しくねーのか？)	February 24, 2017
21	"Good Luck Charm" "Omajinai" (Japanese: おまじない)	March 3, 2017
22	"Your Turf" "Teme no shima" (Japanese: 自分のシマ)	March 10, 2017
23	"My Friend Taught Me" "Dachi ni osowattanda" (Japanese: ダチに教わったんだ)	March 17, 2017
24	"The Opponent We Never Could've Fought" "Zettai tatakaenakatta aite" (Japanese: 絶対戦えなかった相手)	March 24, 2017
25	"All Out" "Ōruauto" (Japanese: オールアウト)	March 31, 2017

=== Other media ===
A drama CD adaptation was bundled with the limited edition of the eighth volume and the reprint of the first volume of the manga, released on February 23, 2016.

=== Stage plays ===
A stage play adaptation of All Out!! was announced on December 22, 2016, with Shatner Nishida as director and scriptwriter. The stage play ran from May 2017 at Zepp Blue Theater Roppongi Tokyo. The casts include Motohisa Harashima, Yu Imari, Daichi Saeki, and Masaya Matsukaze.

== See also ==
- Koko wa Ima kara Rinri Desu, another manga series by Shiori Amase
