= Corridor (album) =

Studio album by Miki Imai
- Released: November 25, 2009
- Genre: Pop
- Length: 51:13
- Label: EMI Music Japan

Miki Imai chronology
I Love a Piano (2008)	Corridor (2009)

Corridor is the eighteenth studio album by Japanese pop singer Miki Imai, released on November 25, 2009. It is her first studio album in 3 years. It debuted at #61 on the weekly Oricon albums chart with 2,926 units sold.

== Track listing ==
No.	Title	Lyrics	Music	Length
1.	"Takaramono" (宝物 "Treasure")	Minako Kawae	Kawae	4:11
2.	"Hitohira" (ひとひら "Petal")	Kawae	Kawae	2:59
3.	"Ordinary Magic"	Kawae	Kei Kawano	5:29
4.	"Beautiful Life"	Marhy, Yūho Iwasato	Kawano	5:34
5.	"Hi no Ataru Basho kara" (陽のあたる場所から "From a Place in the Sun")	Iwasato	Toshiaki Matsumoto	4:39
6.	"Ashiato" (足跡 "Footprints")	Kawae	Kawae	4:43
7.	"Shizuku" (滴 "Drop")	Kawae	Kawae	4:46
8.	"On the Planet" (オン・ザ・プラネット "On za Puranetto")	Iwasato	Kawano	4:41
9.	"Hatsukoi no Yō ni (with Brother Ship)" (初恋のように "Like a First Love")	Iwasato	Mayumi	5:09
10.	"Inori" (祈り "Prayer")	Kawae	Kawae	4:43
11.	"Re-born"	Kawae	Kawae	4:23

== Charts and sales ==
Chart (2009)	Peak position	Sales figures
Japan Billboard Top Albums	70	6,716
Japan Oricon Daily Albums Chart	40	6,716
Japan Oricon Weekly Albums Chart	61	6,716
