= Sham (2025 film) =

2025 legal drama film by Takashi Miike

- Theatrical release poster

Japanese name
- Katakana: でっちあげ 〜殺人教師と呼ばれた男〜
Transcriptions
- Revised Hepburn: Detchiage: Satsujin Kyoshi to Yobareta Otoko
- Directed by: Takashi Miike
- Written by: Hayashi Mori
- Based on: でっちあげ 福岡『殺人教師』事件の真相 by Masumi Fukuda
- Produced by: Keiichi Hashimoto; Shigeji Maeda; Misako Saka; Kenichi Wasano
- Starring: Go Ayano; Ko Shibasaki; Kazuya Kamenashi; Kira Miura; Fumino Kimura; Ken Mitsuishi; Kazuki Kitamura; Kaoru Kobayashi
- Cinematography: Hideo Yamamoto
- Edited by: Naoichiro Sagara
- Music by: Kōji Endō
- Production company: Toei Company
- Distributed by: Toei Company
- Release dates: June 9, 2025 (Tribeca Film Festival); June 16, 2025 (Tokyo); June 27, 2025 (Japan)
- Running time: 129 minutes
- Country: Japan
- Language: Japanese
- Budget: ¥500 million (US$3.3 million)

Sham (Japanese: でっちあげ 〜殺人教師と呼ばれた男〜, Hepburn: Detchiage: Satsujin Kyoshi to Yobareta Otoko) is a 2025 Japanese legal drama thriller film directed by Takashi Miike. It stars Go Ayano as a teacher falsely accused of abusing his student by the boy's mother, with a supporting cast that includes Ko Shibasaki, Kazuya Kamenashi, Kira Miura, Fumino Kimura, Ken Mitsuishi, Kazuki Kitamura, and Kaoru Kobayashi.

Written by Hayashi Mori based on 2007 the nonfiction book Fabrication: The Truth Behind the Fukuoka "Murderous Teacher" Case by Masumi Fukuda, the film is based upon a highly publicised 2003 case in Fukuoka in which a teacher was accused of seriously abusing a pupil. The allegations triggered intense media coverage, public condemnation, and a civil lawsuit supported by around 550 lawyers before the case was ultimately challenged in court.

Sham had its world premiere at the 2025 Tribeca Festival, and was released in Japan on June 27, 2025. The film received generally positive reviews from critics.

== Plot ==
Seiichi Yabushita, a dedicated and respected elementary school teacher, sees his life collapse when Ritsuko Himuro, the mother of a student named Takuto, accuses him of severe harassment and physical abuse.

== Cast ==
- Go Ayano as Seiichi Yabushita (薮下誠一), an elementary-school teacher accused by Ritsuko Himuro of subjecting her son Takuto to severe physical abuse and death threats.
- Ko Shibasaki as Ritsuko Himuro (氷室律子), who claims her son has been mistreated by Yabushita, eventually taking the matter into the media and the courts.
- Kazuya Kamenashi as Michihiko Narumi (鳴海三千彦), a reporter for the weekly magazine Shūkan Shunpō. He seizes on the allegations and publishes Yabushita's real name in a highly sensationalized article, turning the local dispute into a nationwide media scandal.
- Koji Ohkura as Toshiaki Tsuzuki (都築敏明), the vice-principal of Yabushita's elementary school, mainly concerned with maintaining the school's peace and public image.
- Yukiyoshi Ozawa as Yoshifumi Maemura (前村義文), a psychiatry professor at a university hospital who becomes involved in Takuto's psychiatric assessment.
- Masahiro Takashima as Domae (堂前), the editor-in-chief of Shūkan Shunpō and Narumi's superior.
- Takaya Sakoda as Takuma Himuro (氷室拓馬), Ritsuko's husband and Takuto's father.
- Tamae Ando as Natsumi Yamazoe (山添夏美), the mother of Takuto's classmate Junya Yamazoe.
- Rie Mimura as Shōko Hakozaki (箱崎祥子), a psychiatrist involved in Takuto's diagnosis and medical assessment.
- Rie Minemura as Kimiyo Fujino (藤野公代), the superintendent of the Board of Education, involved in the disciplinary process against Yabushita.
- Ayaka Higashino as Togawa (戸川), one of Yabushita's fellow teachers.
- Kisuke Iida as Judge Hashimoto (橋本), the presiding judge in the civil case.
- Kira Miura as Takuto Himuro (氷室拓翔), Ritsuko and Takuma's son, around whom the entire case is built.
- Fumino Kimura as Nozomi Yabushita (薮下希美), Yabushita's wife.
- Ken Mitsuishi as Shigeharu Danta (段田重春), the principal of Yabushita's elementary school. Deeply concerned with self-preservation, he prioritizes protecting the institution and pressures Yabushita into admitting his guilt.
- Kazuki Kitamura as Norio Yamato (大和紀夫), the lawyer representing Ritsuko.
- Kaoru Kobayashi as Toshio Yugamidani (湯上谷年雄), Yabushita's defense lawyer, and the only lawyer initially willing to take his case.

== Production ==
=== Development ===
The project began with Masumi Fukuda's 2007 nonfiction book Fabrication: The Truth Behind the Fukuoka "Murderous Teacher" Case, which investigated a 2003 case in Fukuoka involving an elementary-school teacher accused of abusing a pupil. The case became a major media story, but the teacher ultimately denied the allegations in court and the accusations were found to have been fabricated.

The eventual producer, Kenichi Wasano of Toei Company, had read Fukuda's book but explained that he initially did not see a way to adapt it, as the story involved many real people and therefore seemed especially difficult for television. He later reread it several years before production and said to have been struck by how relevant its central issue had become in the social-media era, deciding to produce a film adaptation.

Takashi Miike was then hired as the director, as Wasano explained that he is "often misunderstood" but "actually very skilled at portraying people, and I decided to put my faith in that ability. I wanted to build on the sense of ‘discomfort’ I had felt, and I thought that Miike would be able to turn it into entertainment." Miike also added that this was "exactly the kind of thing I’ve wanted to make".

According to Miike, Fukuda's reportage was effectively what made the project possible, since it was an already researched journalistic account, and he did not have to spend years independently doing his own research by interviewing participants.

Although the real name of the teacher was initially disclosed by the Shūkan Bunshun, Masumi Fukuda's book でっちあげ 福岡『殺人教師』事件の真相 anonymized his identity, and the film Sham used fictional names for the characters.

=== Filming ===
In an article published by Screen Daily on November 5, 2024, Matt Schley wrote that the film "is the director's first feature based on a work of investigative journalism" and that filming had taken place in August and September of 2024. By 5 November 2024, Toei was already presenting the project to international buyers at the American Film Market while the film was in post-production.

Kaoru Kobayashi stated that "the heat during the outdoor shoots was more like the height of summer than late summer, and both Tsuyoshi and I couldn't help but sweat, so we did our best to act with a cool expression while looking spaced out."

== Release ==
The cast and project became public in 2025, with Gō Ayano, Kō Shibasaki and Kazuya Kamenashi revealed as the leading trio, and Sham had its World Premiere at the 2025 Tribeca Festival.

The films had its premiere at the Tribeca Film Festival on June 9, 2025., followed by a showing at the Shanghai International Film Festival on June 13, 2025.
June 27, 2025 (Japan)

The film held its Japanese premiere event in Tokyo on June 16, 2025, and was released in Japan on June 27 as a nationwide theatrical release, following an extensive promotional campaign with character material, interviews, behind-the-scenes footage and cast promotional videos.

After the Japanese release, the film screened at the Fantasia International Film Festival, Melbourne International Film Festival, and the International Film Festival of India.

Sham was theatrically released over a year later in France, on September 16, 2026.

As of October 2026, the film has only been theatrically released in Japan, Taiwan, France, and the United Kingdom.

== Reception ==
=== Critical response ===
On review aggregation website Rotten Tomatoes, 82% of 17 critics' reviews are positive. Reviewers noted Miike's use of ambiguity in the telling of the story.

Scott Phillips of Forbes called Sham a "masterful combination of insightful screenwriting, compelling performances and unintrusive direction" and "a powerful piece of work that needs no technical embellishment", ranking it as the best film of the 2025 Fantasia International Film Festival.

Siddhant Adlakha of Variety said the film "works until it very suddenly doesn’t, in a manner that — ironically — makes you question the nature of everything you’ve just seen, as though its successes were accidental or illusory."

Peter Bradshaw of The Guardian gave the film 3 stars out of 5 and praised Miike's handling of the film's conflicting perspectives, writing that "in the end, this film does not sit on the fence; there is no Rashomon-style mystery about where the truth lies."

In a review for Windows on Worlds, Hayley Scanlon wrote that the film "flirts with ambiguities but in keeping with its themes eventually descends into a defence of the well-meaning man as its hero becomes so embroiled in the injustice being done to him that he doesn't see that he is not entirely blameless."

Reviewer Daniel Kurland of Bloody Disgusting gave the film 3 out of 5 skulls, writing, "Sham is cruel, unflinching filmmaking that allows Takashi Miike to flex a rare set of muscles that brings out raw, angry work. There can be a hollow nature to some of Miike's endings because they exist in such extreme worlds, yet the opposite is true about Sham. There's a melancholy shred of optimism that's something to be grateful for, but Sham is more a story about fear and retribution, where the truth is a sword instead of a shield. Sham is imperfect and it could have gone deeper with some of its ideas. However, it's exactly the type of film that Miike should have made at this point to remind audiences that there's a beating heart under all that blood and guts."

Reviewer James Hadfield of The Japan Times gave the film two out of five stars, writing, "Miike might argue that he's just looking to entertain his audience, but 'Sham' misses the opportunity for a more layered examination of a tricky and emotionally charged subject. [...] The real-life story of 'Sham' required a scalpel to tease apart. Miike brought a shovel."

Reviewer Panos Kotzathanasis of Asian Movie Pulse wrote, "What begins as a morally ambiguous case eventually veers into a rather one-sided narrative. In an era where stories often blur the line between villain and victim, this can feel refreshingly bold. Yet, considering the emotional toll on the Himuro family and the ambiguity that initially defined the case, this imbalance risks undermining the film's complexity."
