= House of Himiko =

- Japanese poster from House of Himiko
- Directed by: Isshin Inudo
- Written by: Aya Watanabe
- Produced by: Osamu Kubota; Shinji Ogawa
- Starring: Joe Odagiri; Kou Shibasaki; Min Tanaka
- Cinematography: Takahiro Tutai
- Edited by: Hirohide Abe
- Music by: Haruomi Hosono
- Distributed by: Asmik Ace Entertainment
- Release date: August 27, 2005 (Japan)
- Running time: 130 minutes
- Country: Japan
- Language: Japanese

House of Himiko (Japanese: メゾン・ド・ヒミコ, Hepburn: Mezon do himiko ), also known internationally as La Maison de Himiko, is a 2005 Japanese film directed by Isshin Inudo and starring Kō Shibasaki as Saori, Min Tanaka as Saori's father Himiko, and Joe Odagiri as Haruhiko, Himiko's lover. The film was shown at the Japanese film festival in Sydney in December 2006 (as La Maison de Himiko).

== Plot ==
Saori is a young woman struggling to make her way in life. Her gay father, Himiko, had abandoned Saori and her mother years before. Now her father's young lover Haruhiko shows up to tell Saori that her father is dying of cancer. Still angry with her father but in need of money, Saori travels to the House of Himiko, a nursing home established by her father for gay men. Over time, a tenuous relationship begins to develop between Saori, her father, and Haruhiko.

== Cast ==
- Jō Odagiri as Haruhiko
- Ko Shibasaki as Saori
- Min Tanaka as Himiko
- Hidetoshi Nishijima as Hosokawa
- Torauemon Utazawa as Ruby
- Kira Aoyama as Yamazaki

== Reception ==
In 2007, the film won the Nippon Cinema Award at the Nippon Connection Film Festival.
