= Dr. Koto's Clinic =

Japanese manga series

- First tankōbon volume cover, featuring Kensuke Goto

Dr.コトー診療所 (Dokutā Kotō Shinryōjo)
- Genre: Medical
- Manga
- Written by: Takatoshi Yamada
- Published by: Shogakukan
- Magazine: Weekly Young Sunday; (2000–2008); Big Comic Original; (2008–2010)
- Original run: 2000 – 2010 (on hiatus)
- Volumes: 25
- Television drama
- Directed by: Isamu Nakae; Hideki Hirai; Kazuhiro Kobayashi; (S1); Kentaro Takagi; (S2)
- Produced by: Ken Tsuchiya (S1); Yoko Tsukada (S2); Jun Masumoto (S2); Isamu Nakae (S2)
- Written by: Noriko Yoshida
- Music by: Ryo Yoshimata
- Licensed by: Crunchyroll (streaming;former); Netflix (streaming; current)
- Original network: Fuji TV
- Original run: July 3, 2003 – December 21, 2006
- Episodes: 22 + 2 specials
- icon

Dr. Koto's Clinic (Japanese: Dr.コトー診療所, Hepburn: Dokutā Kotō Shinryōjo) is a Japanese manga series written and illustrated by Takatoshi Yamada. It was serialized in Shogakukan's Weekly Young Sunday from 2000 until the magazine's demise in 2008, at which point it moved to Big Comic Original. Shogakukan has compiled its chapters into 25 tankōbon volumes as of June 2010.

The series was adapted as a Japanese television drama series which aired between 2003 and 2006 on Fuji TV. A live-action film adaptation premiered in 2022.

By June 2022, Dr. Koto's Clinic had over 12 million copies in circulation. In 2004, the manga won the 49th Shogakukan Manga Award for the general category.

== Plot ==
Kensuke Goto is an excellent doctor who used to work at a university hospital in Tokyo, but for some reason he is transferred to a clinic on the remote island of Koshikijima. The island has been without a doctor for three months, and he was not very welcomed. In addition, Ayaka Hoshino, a nurse who has been on the island for 4 months, tells him that there are few patients who come to the clinic, and even if they do, they will only receive first aid and then go to a hospital on the mainland, which takes 6 hours by boat. Since then, Goto has earned the trust of the islanders through the treatment of many patients and his personality.

== Characters ==
Kensuke Goto (五島健助, Gotō Kensuke)
Portrayed by: Hidetaka Yoshioka
A young, prominent surgeon leaves a prestigious Tokyo hospital to work at a small clinic on a remote southern Japanese island, where he is the sole doctor. Initially met with skepticism due to the islanders' past experiences with physicians, he gradually earns their trust through his dedication and genuine care for patients. The locals nickname him "Koto" after Takehiro Hara misspells his name on a clinic sign following a successful operation. He prefers cup noodles over homemade meals, even when offered by Hoshino, and frequently suffers from motion sickness, often vomiting after vehicle rides—usually on Hoshino.
Ayaka Hoshino (星野彩佳, Hoshino Ayaka)
Portrayed by: Kou Shibasaki
Nurse at Dr. Koto's clinic
Kazunori Wada (和田一範, Wada Kazunori)
Portrayed by: Toshio Kakei
A staff member at the clinic
Shigeo Ando (安藤重男, Andō Shigeo)
Portrayed by: Shigeru Izumiya
The leader of the fishermen on the island. He is distrustful of Dr. Koto, often calling him a "quack" doctor.
Takehiro Hara (原健裕, Hara Takehiro)
Portrayed by: Ryo Tomioka
A boy who respects Dr. Goto and wants to be a doctor. He used to not trust doctors who come to the island like the rest of the islanders because a doctor's misdiagnosis caused the death of his mother. After having to have emergency surgery performed on him by Dr. Koto, he began to trust and respect Dr Koto, to the point where he wants to become a doctor like him.
Taketoshi Hara (原剛利, Hara Taketoshi)
Portrayed by: Saburō Tokitō
A fisherman and Takehiro's father, he initially distrusts Dr. Koto due to his wife's death from a misdiagnosis by a previous island doctor. However, after Dr. Koto successfully operates on Takehiro and saves his life, he becomes one of the doctor's strongest supporters. He frequently defends Dr. Koto when others oppose him and ensures the doctor is included in local activities.
Shōichi Hoshino (星野正一, Hoshino Shōichi)
Portrayed by: Kaoru Kobayashi
A worker at the Town Office

== Media ==
=== Manga ===
Written and illustrated by Takatoshi Yamada, Dr. Koto's Clinic serialized in Shogakukan's Weekly Young Sunday from 2000 to 2008; when the magazine ceased its publication, it was to the publisher's Big Comic Original magazine. The manga went on indefinite hiatus in October 2010. In October 2017, Yamada posted on his Facebook that he planned to resume his work. Shogakukan has compiled its chapters into individual tankōbon volumes. The first volume was published on November 4, 2000. As of June 30, 2010, twenty-five volumes have been released.

==== Volumes ====
No.	Japanese release date	Japanese ISBN
1	November 4, 2000	978-4-09-152501-7
2	March 5, 2001	978-4-09-152502-4
3	July 5, 2001	978-4-09-152503-1
4	October 5, 2001	978-4-09-152504-8
5	March 5, 2002	978-4-09-152505-5
6	June 5, 2002	978-4-09-152506-2
7	September 5, 2002	978-4-09-152507-9
8	December 5, 2002	978-4-09-152508-6
9	March 5, 2003	978-4-09-152509-3
10	July 5, 2003	978-4-09-152510-9
11	October 5, 2003	978-4-09-153121-6
12	December 26, 2003	978-4-09-153122-3
13	April 5, 2004	978-4-09-153123-0
14	July 5, 2004	978-4-09-153124-7
15	October 5, 2004	978-4-09-153125-4
16	February 4, 2005	978-4-09-153126-1
17	August 5, 2005	978-4-09-153127-8
18	December 5, 2005	978-4-09-153128-5
19	May 2, 2006	978-4-09-151078-5
20	October 5, 2006	978-4-09-151123-2
21	February 5, 2007	978-4-09-151159-1
22	February 5, 2008	978-4-09-151269-7
23	September 30, 2009	978-4-09-151474-5
24	October 30, 2009	978-4-09-151475-2
25	June 30, 2010	978-4-09-151495-0

=== Drama ===
The manga was adapted into a Japanese television drama which aired for eleven episodes on Fuji TV from July 3 to September 11, 2003. It was filmed on the Japanese Archipelago island Yonaguni. A 2-episode special was broadcast on November 12 and 13, 2004. A second season aired for eleven episodes from October 12 to December 21, 2006.

Crunchyroll began streaming the series in 2015. Netflix began streaming the series in 2025.

=== Live-action film ===
A live-action film adaptation, with Hidetaka Yoshioka reprising his role as Kensuke Goto, was distributed by Toho and premiered in Japan on December 16, 2022.

== Reception ==
By June 2022, Dr. Koto's Clinic had over 12 million copies in circulation. In 2004, the manga won the 49th Shogakukan Manga Award in the general category.
