= Ko Shibasaki =

Japanese actress and singer (born 1981)

- 柴咲 コウ
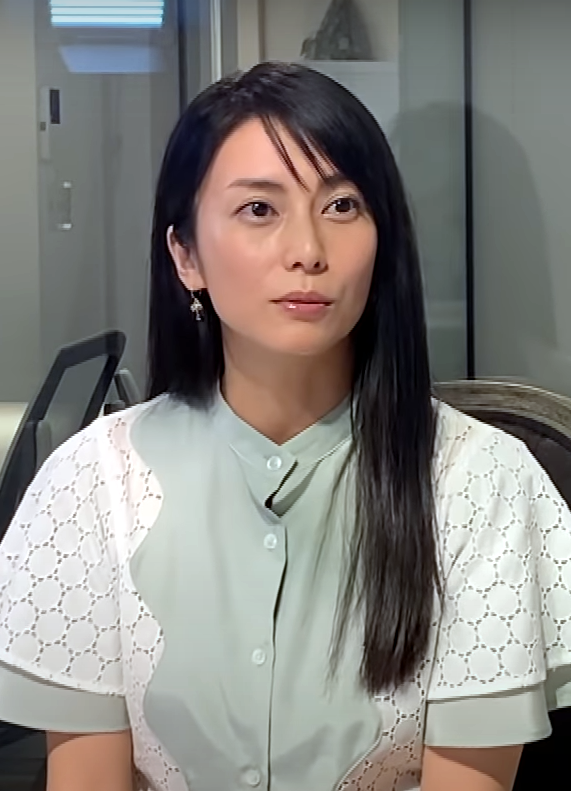
- Shibasaki in 2020
- Born: Yukie Yamamura (山村 幸恵); 5 August 1981 (age 45); Toshima, Tokyo, Japan
- Occupations: Actress; singer
- Years active: 1998–present
- Musical career
- Genre: Pop
- Instrument: Vocals
- Labels: Victor Entertainment; Stardust Promotion
- Member of: galaxias!
- Website: koshibasaki.com

Ko Shibasaki (柴咲 コウ, Shibasaki Kou; born 5 August 1981) is a Japanese actress and singer who has performed in television shows, movies, and commercials. She is managed by Stardust Promotion.

== Biography ==
=== Acting career ===
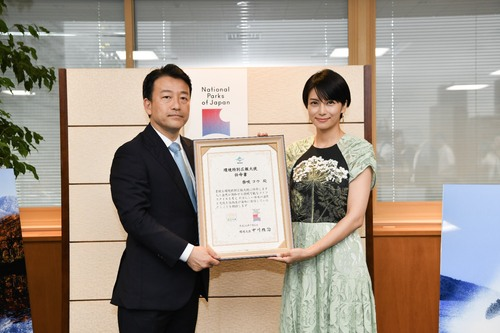
Shibasaki received the Letter of Appointment as the Goodwill Ambassador for the Environment from Hiroyoshi Sasagawa, Parliamentary Secretary of the Environment (at the Central Government Building No.5 on July 6, 2018)

Ko (also transcribed Kou and Koh) Shibasaki debuted in 2000, when she portrayed Mitsuko Souma in Battle Royale. Shibasaki also won critical acclaim for her role as Tsubaki Sakurai in the 2001 film Go, which earned her several awards, including the Best Supporting Actress Award of Japanese Academy, the Hōchi Movie Award, and the Kinema Junpō Award.

In 2013, Shibasaki made her U.S. film debut in 47 Ronin, a Keanu Reeves-led adaptation of the Chushingura story of samurai loyalty and revenge. The film was billed as the first ever English-language adaptation of the legend, based on historical events in the early 18th century.

In 2017, she played the main character Ii Naotora in the NHK Taiga drama TV series Naotora: The Lady Warlord. Before the series was filmed, Shibasaki visited the grave of Naotora.

=== Music career ===
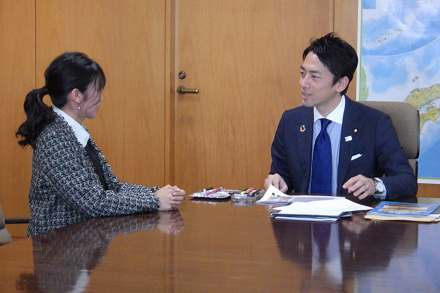
Shibasaki talked with Shinjirō Koizumi, Parliamentary Secretary of the Environment (at the Central Government Building No.5 on December 20, 2019)

Shibasaki has two musical groups: Koh+ (with Masaharu Fukuyama) and Galaxias! (with Deco*27 and TeddyLoid).

Shibasaki made her debut in the music industry in 2002 with her first single, "Trust My Feelings", but she became recognized for her second single, "Tsuki no Shizuku", which was used for the movie Yomigaeri.

Although she does not compose her own music, Kō Shibasaki writes the lyrics for most of her songs. Many of her singles have become theme songs for various films, dramas, and commercials. Her single "Lover Soul" was the ending theme song for the live action drama Otomen.

Her song "Another World" was the soundtrack of the live-action drama Mirai Nikki - Another:World (2011).

In June 2015, Shibasaki released her first cover album Kou Utau, and in June 2016, she released her second cover album Zoku Kou Utau.

== Filmography ==
=== Film ===
Year	Title	Role	Notes	Ref.
2000	Tokyo Raiders	Yumi		
2000	Tokyo Trash Baby	Kyoko		
2000	Battle Royale	Mitsuko Souma		
2001	Run! Ichiro	Miho Nakajima		
2001	Kakashi	Izumi Miyamori		
2001	Go	Tsubaki Sakurai		
2001	Kewaishi	Nakatsu Sayo		
2002	Soundtrack	Misa, Misa (2 roles)		
2002	Drive	Sakai Sumire	Lead role	
2003	Yomigaeri	Rui		
2003	One Missed Call	Yumi Nakamura	Lead role	
2004	Crying Out Love in the Center of the World	Ritsuko Fujimura		
2005	Maison de Himiko	Saori	Lead role	
2006	Star Reformer	Aki Ninomiya		
2006	Legend of Raoh: Chapter of Death in Love	Reina (voice)		
2006	Memories of Matsuko	Asuka Watanabe		
2006	Sinking of Japan	Reiko Abe		
2007	Dororo	Dororo		
2007	Legend of Raoh: Chapter of Fierce Fight	Reina (voice)		
2007	Maiko Haaaan!!!	Fujiko Osawa		
2008	Suspect X	Kaoru Utsumi		
2008	Shaolin Girl	Rin	Lead role	
2010	Shokudo Katatsumuri	Rinko	Lead role	
2012	Sue, Mai & Sawa: Righting the Girl Ship	Yoshiko Morimoto	Lead role	
2013	Detective Conan: Private Eye in the Distant Sea	Nanami Fujii (voice)		
2013	Galileo XX	Detective Kaoru Utsumi		
2013	47 Ronin	Mika	American film	
2014	A Bolt from the Blue	Etsuko Hanamura		
2014	Over Your Dead Body	Miyuki Gotō, Oiwa		
2016	Nobunaga Concerto	Kichō		
2019	The Island of Cats	Michiko		
2020	State of Emergency	Himself		
2021	Baragaki: Unbroken Samurai	Oyuki		
2021	Child of Kamiari Month	Yayoi Hayama (voice)		
2022	Silent Parade	Kaoru Utsumi		
2022	xxxHolic	Yuko Ichihara	Lead role	
2022	Phases of the Moon	Kozue Osanai		
2022	The Three Sisters of Tenmasou Inn	Izuko		
2022	Dr. Coto's Clinic 2022	Ayaka Gotō		
2023	The Boy and the Heron	Kiriko (voice)		
2023	Don't Call it Mystery: The Movie	Yura Akamine		
2024	Serpent's Path	Sayoko	Lead role; French-Japanese film	
2025	Sham	Ritsuko Himuro		
2025	Bring Him Down to a Portable Size	Riko Murai	Lead role	
2026	The Brightest Sun	Yuki		
2026	One Year to Live, Buy a Man	Yui Katakura	Lead role	

=== Television ===
Year	Title	Role	Notes	Ref.
2002	Sora Kara Furu Ichioku no Hoshi	Yuki Mizashita		
2003	Good Luck!!	Ayumi Ogawa		
2003–06	Dr. Coto's Clinic	Ayaka Hoshino	2 seasons	
2004	Orange Days	Sae Hagio	Lead role	
2007	Galileo	Detective Kaoru Utsumi		
2010	Wagaya no Rekishi	Masako Yame	Lead role; miniseries	
2011	The Diplomat Kosaku Kuroda	Rikako Ogaki		
2013	Andō Lloyd: A.I. knows Love?	Asahi Ando		
2014	Nobunaga Concerto	Kichō		
2015	Maru Maru Tsuma	Hikari	Lead role	
2017	Naotora: The Lady Warlord	Ii Naotora	Lead role; Taiga drama	
2018	Dele	Akina Sawatari	Episode 5	
2020	Yell	Tamaki Futaura	Asadora	
2025	Scandal Eve	Saki Ioka	Lead role	

=== Dubbing ===
- Cruella, Cruella de Vil (Emma Stone)
- The Matrix Resurrections, Gwyn de Vere (Christina Ricci)

== Discography ==
Shibasaki has sold over 4 million singles combined.

=== Studio albums ===
List of studio albums, with selected chart positions
Title	Album information	Oricon peak position
Mitsu (蜜)	Released: February 11, 2004; Label: Universal J; Catalog No.: UPCH-1327	2
Hitori Asobi (ひとりあそび)	Released: December 14, 2005; Label: Universal J; Catalog No.: UPCH-1450	6
Kiki (嬉々♥)	Released: April 25, 2007; Label: Universal J; Catalog No.: UPCH-29003	3
Love Paranoia	Released: November 18, 2009; Label: Nayutawave Records; Catalog No.: UPCH-29039	2
Circle Cycle	Released: May 18, 2011; Label: Nayutawave Records; Catalog No.: UPCH-29069	3
Lyrical Wonder (リリカル*ワンダー)	Released: December 12, 2012; Label: Nayutawave Records; Catalog No.: UPCH-29092	20
Ko Utau (こううたう)	Released: June 17, 2015; Label: Victor Entertainment; Catalog No.: VIZL-782; Cover album	12
Zoku Ko Utau (続こううたう)	Released: July 20, 2016; Label: Victor Entertainment; Catalog No.: VIZL-1002; Cover album	10

=== Compilation albums ===
List of compilation albums, with selected chart positions
Title	Album information	Oricon peak position
Single Best	Released: March 12, 2008; Label: Nayutawave Records; Catalog No.: UPCH-29010	1
The Back Best	Released: March 12, 2008; Label: Nayutawave Records; Catalog No.: UPCH-29011	3
Love&Ballad Selection	Released: June 30, 2010; Label: Nayutawave Records; Catalog No.: UPCH-29054	9

=== Extended plays ===
List of extended plays, with selected chart positions
Title	EP information	Oricon peak position
Hitotsuboshi: Galileo Collection 2007–2022 (ヒトツボシ ～ガリレオ Collection 2007-2022～)	Released: September 14, 2022; Label: Universal Music Japan; Catalog no.: POCS-20024	1
Kyo-en (響宴)	Released: November 27, 2024; Label: Victor Entertainment	31
Kaiko (邂逅)	Released: October 22, 2025; Label: Universal	44

=== Singles ===
Title	Release date	Peak chart positions		Album
Title	Release date	Oricon	Japan Hot 100	Album
"Trust my feelings"	July 24, 2002	50	×	Single Best
"Tsuki no Shizuku" (月のしずく) - as Rui	January 15, 2003	1	×	Mitsu
"Nemuri Renai Yoru wa Nemuri Ranai Yume o" (眠レナイ夜ハ眠ラナイ夢ヲ)	June 4, 2003	7	×	Mitsu
"Omoide Dakede wa Tsurasugiru" (思い出だけではつらすぎる)	September 3, 2003	9	×	Mitsu
"Ikutsuka no Sora" (いくつかの空)	January 14, 2004	10	×	Mitsu
"Katachi Aru Mono" (かたち あるもの)	August 11, 2004	2	×	Single Best
"Glitter"	February 16, 2005	6	×	Hitori Asobi
"Sweet Mom"	October 5, 2005	3	×	Hitori Asobi
"Kage" (影)	February 15, 2006	2	×	Kiki
"Invitation"	August 9, 2006	9	×	Kiki
"Actuality"	December 6, 2006	20	×	Single Best
"at home"	February 21, 2007	24	×	Kiki
"Hito Koi Meguri" (ひと恋めぐり)	March 28, 2007	8	×	Kiki
"Prism" (プリズム)	May 30, 2007	20	×	Single Best
"Kiss Shite" (KISSして) - as Koh+	November 21, 2007	3	×	Single Best
"Yoku Aru Hanashi: Mofuku no Onna-hen" (よくある話 〜喪服の女編〜)	June 4, 2008	6	14	Love Paranoia
"Saiai" (最愛) - as Koh+	October 1, 2008	5	3	Love Paranoia
"Taisetsu ni Suru yo" (大切にするよ)	March 4, 2009	16	23	Love Paranoia
"Love Soul" (ラバソー 〜lover soul〜)	September 16, 2009	3	8	Love Paranoia
"Honto dayo" (ホントだよ)	April 4, 2010	8	8	Love&Ballad Collection
"Euphoria"	November 3, 2010	15	37	Circle Cycle
"Mukei Spirit" (無形スピリット)	February 9, 2011	12	15	Circle Cycle
"Wish"	April 20, 2011	12	23	Circle Cycle
"Strength"	March 14, 2012	26	33	Lyrical Wonder
"Another World"	June 13, 2012	12	19	Lyrical Wonder
"My Perfect Blue/Yukuyuku wa" (My Perfect Blue/ゆくゆくは)	October 31, 2012	28	35	Lyrical Wonder
"Love Searchlight" (ラブサーチライト)	April 16, 2014	22	21	
"Aoi Hoshi" (蒼い星)	August 27, 2014	36	TBA	–
"Yasei no dōmei" (野性の同盟)	November 25, 2015	38	TBA	

- "×" denotes periods where charts did not exist or were not archived.

=== DVDs ===
- Kō Shibasaki Single Clips (2004)
- Kō Shibasaki Invitation Live (2007)
- Live Tour 2008 -1st- DVD (2008)

== Awards ==
=== Movies ===
- For her role in the 2001 movie Go:

	Award ceremony	Award	Result
25th	Japan Academy Film Prize	Best Supporting Actress, Newcomer of the Year	Won
75th	Kinema Junpo Best 10	Outstanding Performance by an Actress in a Supporting Role	Won
26th	Hochi Film Awards	Best Supporting Actress	Won
23rd	Yokohama Film Festival	Best Supporting Actress	Won
44th	Blue Ribbon Awards	Best New Artist	Won
14th	Nikkan Sports Film Award	Best New Artist	Won
56th	Mainichi Film Award	Sports Nippon Grand Prix Newcomer of the Year	Won
11th	Tokyo Sports Film Award	Best New Artist	Won
12th	Japan Film Critics Awards	Best New Artist	Won
16th	Takasaki Film Festival	Best New Actress	Won

- For her role in the 2005 movie House of Himiko:

	Award ceremony	Award	Result
29th	Fumiko Yamaji Awards	Best Actress	Won
1st	Osaka Film Festival	Best performance by an actress in a leading role	Won

=== Others ===
	Award ceremony	Award	Result
27th	Elan d'or Awards	Newcomer of the Year	Won
