= The Boy and the Heron =

2023 film by Hayao Miyazaki

- Theatrical release poster

Japanese name
- Kanji: 君たちはどう生きるか
- Literal meaning: How Do You Live?
Transcriptions
- Revised Hepburn: Kimitachi wa Dō Ikiru ka
- Directed by: Hayao Miyazaki
- Written by: Hayao Miyazaki
- Produced by: Toshio Suzuki
- Starring: Soma Santoki; Masaki Suda; Aimyon; Yoshino Kimura; Shōhei Hino; Ko Shibasaki; Takuya Kimura
- Cinematography: Atsushi Okui
- Edited by: Takeshi Seyama
- Music by: Joe Hisaishi
- Production company: Studio Ghibli
- Distributed by: Toho
- Release date: July 14, 2023
- Running time: 124 minutes
- Country: Japan
- Language: Japanese
- Box office: US$294.2 million

The Boy and the Heron (Japanese: 君たちはどう生きるか, Hepburn: Kimitachi wa Dō Ikiru ka; lit. 'How Do You (Note: Second-person plural, as in "you all") Live?') is a 2023 Japanese animated fantasy film written and directed by Hayao Miyazaki. The film's Japanese title references the 1937 novel How Do You Live? by Genzaburō Yoshino, but is not an adaptation of it. Produced by Studio Ghibli, the film stars the voices of Soma Santoki, Masaki Suda, Ko Shibasaki, Aimyon, Yoshino Kimura, Takuya Kimura, Kaoru Kobayashi, and Shinobu Otake. It follows a boy named Mahito Maki who moves to the countryside after his mother's death, discovers an abandoned tower near his new home, and enters a fantastical world with a talking grey heron.

Miyazaki announced his retirement in September 2013 but later reversed this decision after working on the short film Boro the Caterpillar (2018). He began storyboarding for a new feature-length project in July 2016, and official production began in May 2017. The film's title was announced in October 2017, initially targeting a release around the 2020 Summer Olympics. By May 2020, 36 minutes of the film had been hand-drawn by 60 animators, with no set deadline. Production spanned approximately seven years, facing delays due to the COVID-19 pandemic and Miyazaki's slowed animation pace, before nearing completion in October 2022. Financing for the project involved streaming deals for previous Ghibli films. According to producer Toshio Suzuki, The Boy and the Heron is the most expensive film ever produced in Japan. The screenplay draws heavily from Miyazaki's childhood and explores themes of coming of age and coping with a world marked by conflict and loss. Joe Hisaishi composed the film's score, while Kenshi Yonezu wrote and sang the film's theme song "Spinning Globe".

The Boy and the Heron was released in Japan on July 14, 2023, by Toho, and was screened in both traditional theaters and in other formats such as IMAX. The release was noted for its intentional absence of any promotion, with Ghibli choosing not to release any trailers, images, synopsis, or casting details of the film in advance of its Japanese premiere except a single poster. The film received critical acclaim and grossed US$294.2 million worldwide, making it the sixth highest-grossing Japanese film of all time. Among its numerous accolades, the film was named by the National Board of Review as one of the top 10 films of 2023 and won Best Animated Feature Film at the Academy Awards, the BAFTA Awards, the Golden Globe Awards, and the Japanese Academy Film Prize.

== Plot ==
During the Pacific War, Mahito Maki loses his hospitalized mother, Hisako, in a fire. Mahito's father Shoichi, an air munitions factory owner, marries his late wife's sister, Natsuko, and they evacuate to her rural estate. Mahito, distant to the pregnant Natsuko, encounters a peculiar grey heron leading him to a sealed tower, the last known location of Natsuko's architect granduncle.

After a school fight, Mahito deliberately injures himself. The heron, now speaking, entices Mahito with promises of finding his mother. Mahito is nearly kidnapped by a swarm of creatures, but Natsuko saves him with a whistling arrow, inspiring him to craft his own bow and arrow. The arrow is magically imbued with true aim after it is fletched with the heron's feather. Mahito's reading of a book left by Hisako is interrupted when an ill Natsuko disappears into the forest. Leading one of the estate's elderly maids, Kiriko, into the tower, Mahito is deceived by a watery imitation of his mother made by the heron, which dissolves at his touch. Affronted, he pierces the heron's beak with his arrow, revealing a flightless creature, the Birdman, living inside it. A wizard appears, ordering the Birdman to guide Mahito and Kiriko as all three sink into the floor.

Mahito descends into an oceanic world. He is rescued from attacking pelicans and a forbidding, megalithic dolmen by a younger Kiriko, an adept fisherwoman who uses fire through a magic wand. They catch and sell a giant fish to bubble-like spirits called Warawara, which fly to the world above to be reborn. A pyrokinetic young woman, Himi, protects Warawara from predation by the pelicans. A dying pelican explains that their species is desperate to survive after being introduced to this world with no other food. Kiriko mediates peace between Mahito and the Birdman, and Mahito plugs the Birdman's beak, restoring his flight. The two are separated by anthropomorphic, man-eating parakeets. Himi saves Mahito and shows him a counterpart of the tower which contains doors to many worlds. They enter a door leading back to Natsuko's estate and are spotted by Shoichi, but Mahito returns through the door to continue his search for Natsuko.

Infiltrating the parakeets' kingdom, Mahito finds Natsuko in a delivery room. Natsuko rebuffs him, and Mahito calls her his mother. Himi incinerates the paper attacking them, but all three are rendered unconscious by the encounter. In a dream, Mahito meets the wizard, Natsuko's granduncle. The wizard, preoccupied with a stack of stone toy blocks representing their dimension, requests Mahito, possessing the power of his bloodline, to succeed in the custodianship of this world. Mahito notices that the blocks are infused with malice. Waking up, he is freed from captivity by the Birdman. They climb the tower to pursue the Parakeet King, who is delivering Himi to the wizard, hoping to convince him to maintain the world. The wizard has collected replacement blocks free of malice for Mahito and implores him to build a better world with them. Mahito refuses, acknowledging his own malice embodied by his self-inflicted scar, and vows instead to embrace those who love him.

The Parakeet King takes the blocks and tries to build a better world himself, but the stack is too unstable and falls. The world begins to collapse and flood, and Mahito, Himi, and the Birdman escape, reuniting with Natsuko and young Kiriko. Learning that Himi is his birth mother, Mahito warns her of her fate, but she returns to her own time without worry. Mahito returns with Natsuko, amidst an exodus of animals that revert to non-anthropomorphic forms. The Birdman notices Mahito keeping a stone of power, and advises him to forget his experiences. A charm doll carried by Mahito transforms back into the old Kiriko. Two years after the war, Mahito moves back to Tokyo with his father, Natsuko, and his new brother.

== Voice cast ==
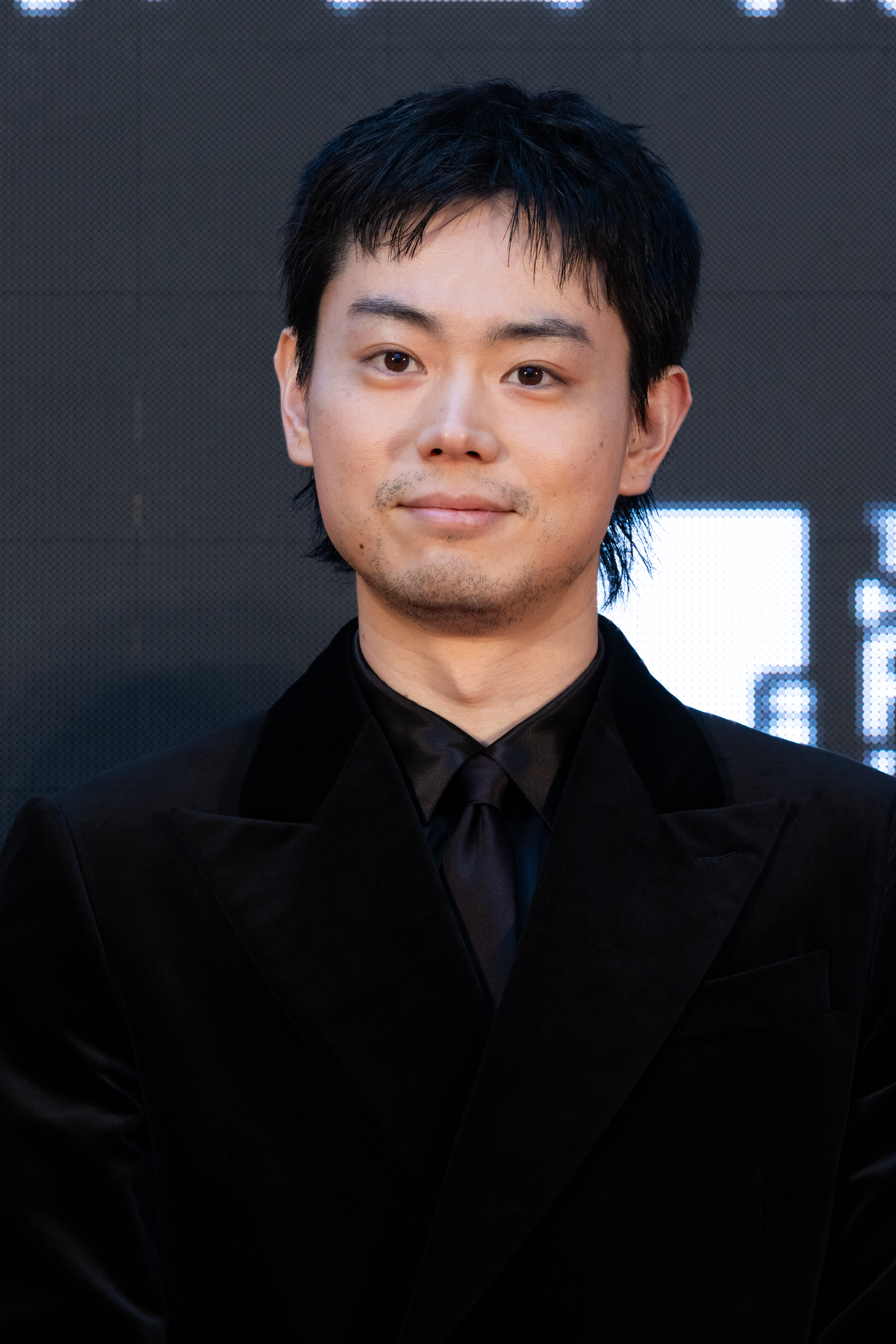
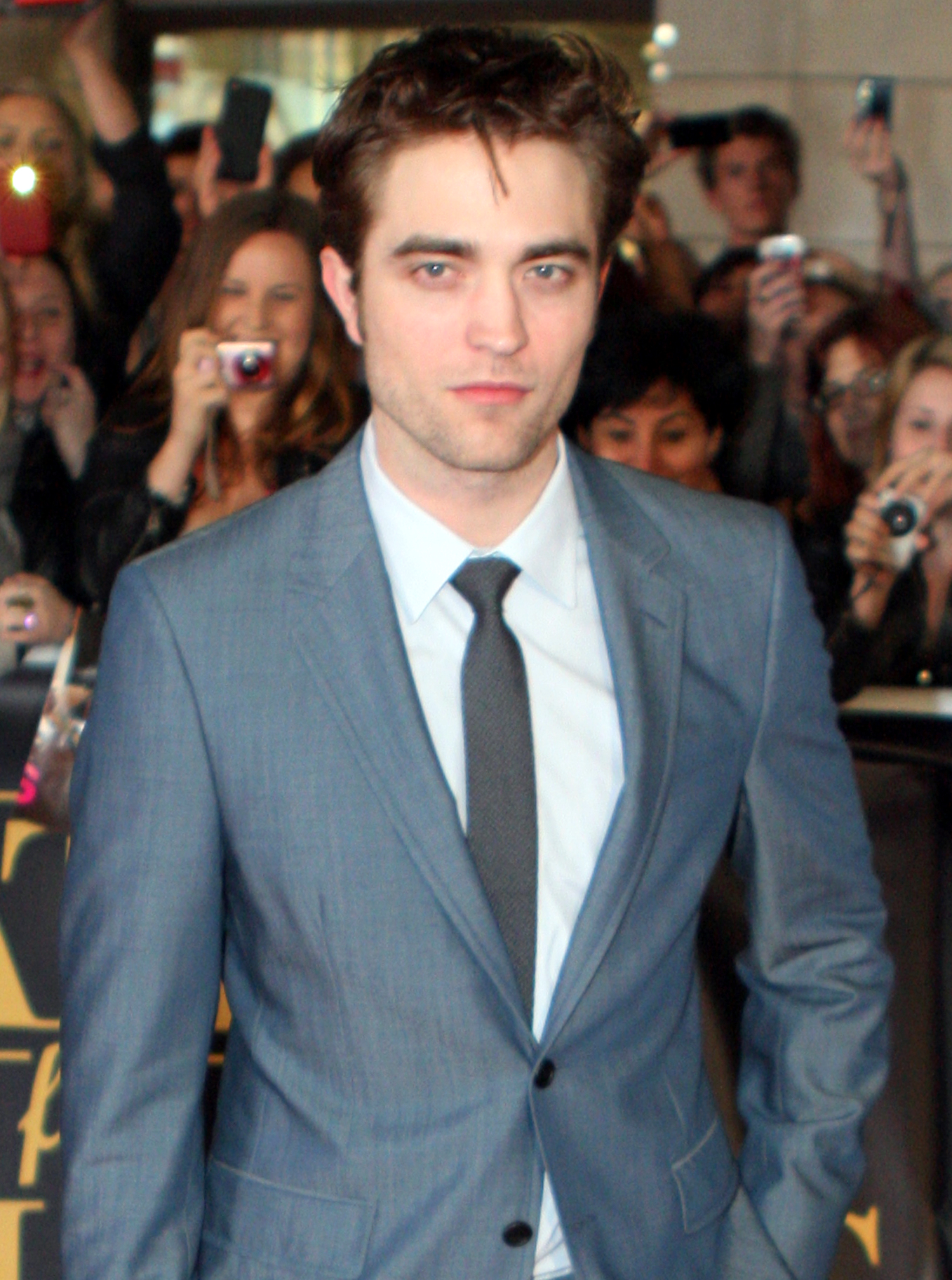
Masaki Suda (left) and Robert Pattinson (right) voiced the Grey Heron in the Japanese and English versions, respectively.

Character	Voice actor	
Character	Japanese	English
Mahito Maki	Soma Santoki	Luca Padovan
The Grey Heron	Masaki Suda	Robert Pattinson
Lady Himi	Aimyon	Karen Fukuhara
Natsuko	Yoshino Kimura	Gemma Chan
Shoichi Maki	Takuya Kimura	Christian Bale
Granduncle	Shōhei Hino	Mark Hamill
Kiriko	Ko Shibasaki	Florence Pugh
Noble Pelican	Kaoru Kobayashi	Willem Dafoe
The Parakeet King	Jun Kunimura	Dave Bautista
Izumi (Maid #1)	Keiko Takeshita	Denise Pickering
Utako (Maid #2)	Jun Fubuki	Barbara Rosenblat
Eriko (Maid #3)	Sawako Agawa	Melora Harte
Aiko (Maid #4)	Shinobu Otake	Barbara Goodson
Warawara	Karen Takizawa	Karen Takizawa
Parakeets	—N/a	Mamoudou Athie; Tony Revolori; Dan Stevens

== Production ==
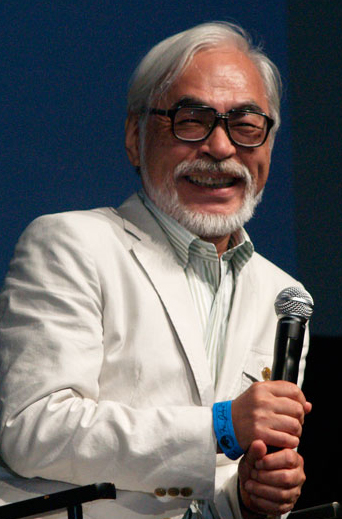
Director Hayao Miyazaki in 2009

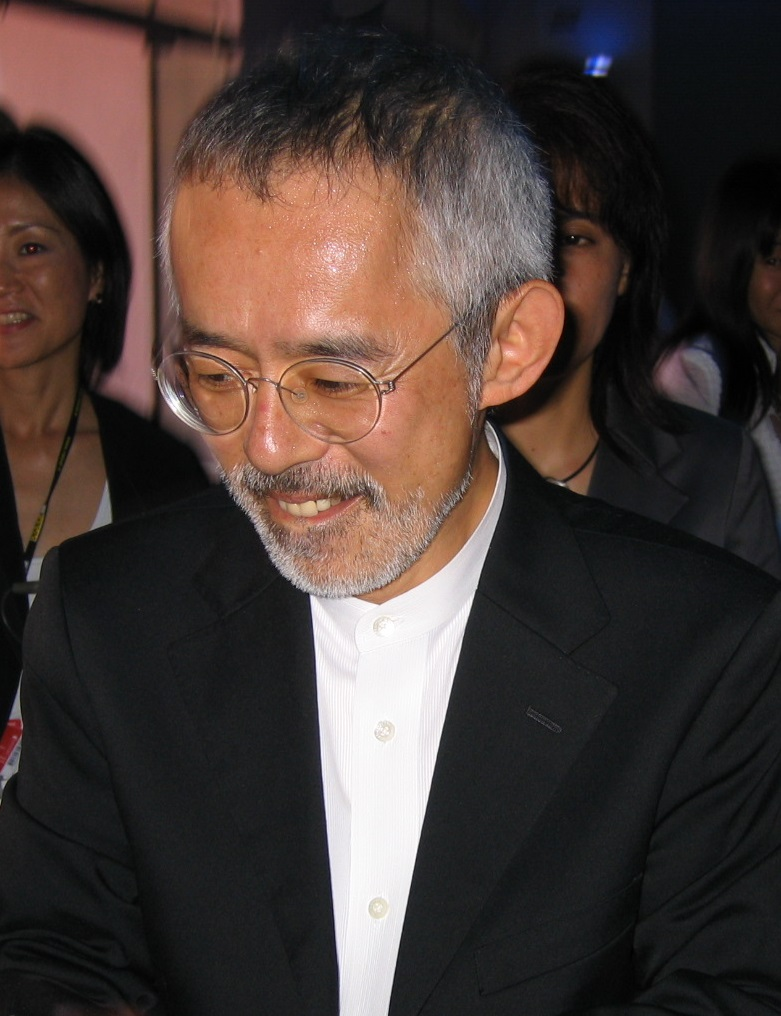
Producer Toshio Suzuki in 2004

Following the release of The Wind Rises (2013), Miyazaki held a press conference in Tokyo in September 2013 announcing his retirement from feature animation, saying: "I know I've said I would retire many times in the past. Many of you must think, 'Once again.' But this time I am quite serious." However, Miyazaki later changed his mind after concluding work on the short film Boro the Caterpillar (2018) and decided to come out of retirement to direct another full-length film; his decision was captured in the 2016 documentary film Never-Ending Man: Hayao Miyazaki. He commenced storyboarding for the film in July 2016 and presented a project proposal for it the following month. This proposal included the children's novel The Book of Lost Things by Irish author John Connolly, which formed "a loose framework" for the project. Edogawa Ranpo's Ghost Tower (幽霊塔, Yūrei-tō), which Miyazaki loved as a child, inspired the tower in the film.

Although initially resistant, Toshio Suzuki approved the project, taking into account Miyazaki's commitment and storyboard work. After Suzuki announced the start of work on Miyazaki's new film in February 2017, the studio's official website posted a call for staff for the new project on May 19, 2017, and production began in earnest. With Miyazaki coming out of retirement, Studio Ghibli reopened, with many of its past collaborators working on the project. At an event held at Waseda University in October 2017, Studio Ghibli announced the film would be titled Kimitachi wa Dō Ikiru ka, after the 1937 novel by Genzaburō Yoshino. Suzuki clarified that the novel is not related to the film beyond inspiring the title. The release date was not determined, but Miyazaki voiced his desire to release the film around the time of the 2020 Summer Olympics in Japan. Suzuki said that Miyazaki was working on the film for his grandson as his way of saying "Grandpa is moving on to the next world, but he's leaving behind this film."

Suzuki stated in August 2018 that the film was expected to be completed in 2021 or 2022. He stated that it was 15% complete at the end of October 2019. In a December 2019 interview with NHK, Suzuki explained that the film was not to be expected anytime soon; Miyazaki in his younger age used to produce 10 minutes of animation every month, but now his speed was reduced to 1 minute per month. Despite talk of Miyazaki's upcoming film being his last, Suzuki doubted it, asserting that as long as Miyazaki lives, he will likely keep making films. Unlike his previous films, Miyazaki did not oversee every single frame and focused on the storyboards, while the animation director Takeshi Honda took charge of the animation process. In February 2020, the studio decided to release some of its previous filmography on streaming platforms like Netflix in order to finance the production. Suzuki convinced Miyazaki to make the deal as he did not use a computer or smartphone and was unaware of online streaming.

In May 2020, Suzuki recounted to Entertainment Weekly that 60 animators were working on the film, and that an estimated 36 minutes had been completed after three years of production, saying "we are still hand-drawing everything, but it takes us more time to complete a film because we're drawing more frames", and they were "hoping it will finish in the next three years". In December 2020, Suzuki stated that the production was working with no deadlines, similarly to The Tale of the Princess Kaguya (2013), which took eight years to make. He said that COVID-19 pandemic restrictions had not stopped production, and that half of the film's estimated 125 minutes were complete. He also revealed that Miyazaki wanted to adapt Diana Wynne Jones's Earwig and the Witch during development, but his son Goro directed the adaptation instead. Cinematographer Atsushi Okui suggested the idea of using Dolby Cinema to Miyazaki during the production of Earwig and the Witch. Okui was particularly drawn to the technology's ability to maintain image sharpness in bright scenes while preventing dark areas from becoming overly black.

In October 2021, Miyazaki told T that he was making the film because he did not have an answer to the question "how do you live?" In October 2022, the chairman of Studio Ghibli Koji Hoshino stated that the film was approaching completion, but did not specify a release date. In December 2022, Takuya Kimura, who voiced Howl in Howl's Moving Castle, "hinted" that he was in the film with a post on social media. Suzuki considered The Boy and the Heron to be the most expensive film ever produced in Japan. The production timeline spanned approximately seven years, comprising two and a half years dedicated to pre-production activities and about five years for the production phase.

GKIDS managed casting for the English version in collaboration with Studio Ghibli. The dub was directed by Michael Sinterniklaas at NYAV Post, and Stephanie Sheh wrote the script. The English cast, unveiled on October 17, features Christian Bale, Dave Bautista, Gemma Chan, Willem Dafoe, Karen Fukuhara, Mark Hamill, Robert Pattinson, and Florence Pugh. Pattinson spent several weeks perfecting a nasal growl in preparation to play the Heron, and was able to record all of his dialogue in two days.

== Themes ==
The Boy and the Heron has autobiographical features. (Note: GKIDS advertised the film as a "semi-autobiographical fantasy about life, death, and creation, in tribute to friendship, from the mind of Hayao Miyazaki.") The childhood of the protagonist, Mahito Maki, mirrors Miyazaki's. Miyazaki's father, like Mahito's father, was employed by a company involved in the manufacturing of fighter plane components. Additionally, Miyazaki's family had to evacuate from the city to the countryside during the war. The hospital fire at the beginning of the film evokes personal parallels with Miyazaki's loss of his mother, who was known for her strong opinions and is believed to have been a source of inspiration for several of the director's female characters. Mahito's emotional connection with his mother parallels Miyazaki's love for his mother. Taichiro Yoshino, the grandson of Genzaburō Yoshino, recalled that Miyazaki intended to differentiate Mahito from the joyful and optimistic protagonists of his previous films, as he felt that "boys are actually less pure and swirling with all kinds of things." Fiction Horizon found Mahito to embody traits of resilience, vulnerability, and transformative growth., and the BBC defined the film as "a coming-of-age tale in which a child must overcome his selfishness and learn to live for others."

For Nikkei Asia's Kaori Shoji, the film's primary driving force is the longing for a mother's presence and a "quest for worthiness", a recurring theme in Miyazaki's works. This emotion fuels the narrative, occasionally diverting into adventures involving fantastical creatures. Mahito's father marries Hisako's sister, evoking Freudian undertones. Shoji also identified certain "quasi-sexual" elements, such as a scene in which Mahito is covered in frogs.

Suzuki spoke of Miyazaki's desire to create the film based on personal experiences and relationships when he proposed it in 2016. He was initially taken aback, given Miyazaki's avoidance of highly personal themes. The narrative is inspired by Miyazaki's (Mahito) professional relationships with Isao Takahata (Granduncle) and Suzuki (Heron), and integrates themes of destruction, reconstruction and imagination. Following Takahata's death in 2018, revisions were made to the film, shifting the focus from the Granduncle to the relationship between Mahito and Heron. Suzuki observed that Miyazaki's storytelling choices were deeply influenced by the memories shared between him and Miyazaki. A review on RogerEbert.com said that the film was "the work of an artist reflecting on a career." It also portrays old age as connected to, and mirrored in, childhood. IndieWire's Brian Welk argued that the film synthesizes various tonal and stylistic elements from Miyazaki's past work. He drew attention to the film's departure from the traditional children's genre, instead aligning more closely with the "violent" style of Princess Mononoke (1997) than the "cuddly charm" of My Neighbor Totoro (1988).

The film contains the message of creating "a world without conflict with your own hands." According to Matt Schley of The Japan Times, the film underscores Miyazaki's belief in the goodness of children, similarly to other entries in his filmography. He analyzed the film's Japanese title as presenting children with a moral choice: to imitate the perpetrators of the Pacific War or "to, under trying circumstances, rise to the occasion and do better". The Hollywood Reporter noted that the film shares the spiritual growth element of the book. Open to various interpretations, the film conveys "resilience in the face of conflict and grief, a gentle call to find friends and trusted allies, to move forward and bring humanity and understanding to the world." However, in contrast with the book, which was written as moral guidance for adolescent boys, the film addresses the question "how do you live?" ambiguously. According to Vox, multiple moralities can be inferred, but the film stresses the Granduncle's command to his descendants: to perform their duties urgently, as time is passing quickly.

As highlighted by Unseen Japan, the themes make the viewer reflect on their role in a world marked by violence and uncertainty, their obligations to future generations and their connection to their ancestors. This view was echoed by other publications, who commented that Miyazaki's recurring exploration of the processes that follow death and profound loss is a central theme, showing the importance of everyday choices through a journey of self-discovery and the search for meaning amid life's uncertainties. Vulture noted that despite the serious narrative of the multi-themed film, it deliberately includes scenes of bird droppings, which provides comic relief, and which it felt were in line with Miyazaki's broader message about the messy and natural aspects of life as opposed to the oppressive order of Imperial Japan depicted in the film.

== Music ==
The film score was composed and conducted by Miyazaki's longtime collaborator Joe Hisaishi. The soundtrack, consisting of 37 songs, was released in Japan on August 9, 2023, by Tokuma Japan Communications. Kenshi Yonezu was in charge of the theme song, titled "Chikyūgi" (地球儀; lit. "Globe") in Japan and "Spinning Globe" internationally. Yonezu's first visit to Studio Ghibli in 2018 led to his collaboration with Miyazaki, driven by his composition of "Paprika" for the 2020 Summer Olympics. Suzuki witnessed Miyazaki singing the song with children at Ghibli's nursery school, and the director approved the composition after reviewing a demo recording. Yonezu, shown storyboards and provided with project details, engaged in a five-year creative process with Miyazaki and Suzuki, resulting in the completion of the musical composition.

== Release ==
=== Theatrical ===
On December 13, 2022, Toho declared that The Boy and the Heron would be released theatrically in Japan on July 14, 2023. The film was released in Japan without any traditional marketing campaign, with no trailers or promotional stills of the film released before its premiere with the exception of a single poster. The cast and crew also remained undisclosed. This decision came from Suzuki, who preferred to avoid traditional marketing methods due to concerns about revealing too much of the film's content. Suzuki believed that moviegoers preferred a more enigmatic cinema experience. After the preview screening held in late February 2023, a message from Miyazaki was read out following the end credits, saying, "Perhaps you didn't understand it. I myself don't understand it." Suzuki stated that Miyazaki had expressed concern about the film's limited publicity, but affirmed his own confidence in the production and believed it best for the film. It was the first Studio Ghibli and Miyazaki film to have a simultaneous release on IMAX, as well as other formats like Dolby Atmos, Dolby Cinema, and DTS:X.

The film was pre-sold overseas with no concrete release date. Goodfellas, formerly known as Wild Bunch International, served as the sales agent for the film's distribution. The North American rights were acquired by distributor GKIDS, making it the widest film release in the company's 15-year history. The first photos from the film were published in the theater pamphlets distributed by Ghibli on August 11. It was screened in special previews on November 22 ahead of its theatrical United States release on December 8, 2023. The film had its international premiere at the 2023 Toronto International Film Festival on September 7, becoming the first animated film to open the festival. The film was also shown at the 71st San Sebastián International Film Festival, the 2023 New York Film Festival, the 56th Sitges Film Festival and the 42nd Vancouver International Film Festival. (Note: Multiple references:)

Studio Ghibli granted promotional control to GKIDS for the American release, leading GKIDS to adapt a new marketing strategy, including the release of a teaser trailer in advance of the film's international premiere at the Toronto International Film Festival, to reach a wider audience. At the international premiere, where the director Guillermo del Toro introduced the film at its gala presentation, (Note: Miyazaki refrained from attending the world premiere and participating in promotional activities for the film in Japan, reportedly due to his age and "in an effort to raise the [film's] mystique". Cameron Bailey asked del Toro to present the film.) Studio Ghibli's Vice President Junichi Nishioka said that Ghibli did not consider The Boy and the Heron to be Miyazaki's final film, and that he was developing ideas for a new film, continuing to come to the office every day; Suzuki echoed this statement in October 2023. Later that month, the official guidebook for the film was released, showing behind-the-scenes featurettes such as interviews, roundtable discussions and storyboards.

=== Home media ===
The Boy and the Heron was released by Walt Disney Japan on DVD, Blu-ray, and Ultra HD Blu-ray on July 3, 2024. It was the first 4K release for a Studio Ghibli film. In North America, it was released by GKIDS and Shout! Studios in the same formats on July 9, preceded by a digital release on June 25 and followed by a streaming release on HBO Max on September 6. It was released on Netflix in territories outside the US and Japan on October 7.

== Reception ==
=== Box office ===
Date	Tickets sold	Gross (¥)	Gross (US$)	Ref.
Jul 16	—N/a	¥1.8 billion	$13.2 million	
Jul 18	1.35 million	¥2.1 billion	$15.2 million	
Jul 24	2.3 million	¥3.6 billion	$25.5 million	
Jul 31	3.0 million	¥4.7 billion	$33.2 million	
Aug 7	3.6 million	¥5.5 billion	$38.7 million	
Aug 14	4.1 million	¥6.2 billion	$43.0 million	
Aug 21	4.6 million	¥6.9 billion	$48.0 million	
Aug 28	4.9 million	¥7.4 billion	$50.6 million	
Sep 4	5.1 million	¥7.7 billion	$52.9 million	
Sep 11	—N/a	¥7.9 billion	$53.8 million	
Sep 18	5.5 million	¥8.16 billion	$55.0 million	
Sep 25	5.5 million	¥8.3 billion	$55.6 million	
Oct 2	—N/a	¥8.3 billion	$55.8 million	
Oct 9	—N/a	¥8.4 billion	$56.2 million	

In Japan, The Boy and the Heron grossed US$13.2 million (¥1.8 billion) in its opening weekend, becoming Studio Ghibli's biggest opening and surpassing Howl's Moving Castle's ¥1.5 billion debut in 2004. The film earned US$1.7 million from 44 IMAX screens, setting a new 3-day record. It attracted 1.35 million viewers and exceeded ¥2.1 billion (US$15.2 million) in box office revenue in its first four days. On September 11, the film became the 20th highest-grossing anime in Japan. It dropped out of the top 10 grossing films for the first time in its thirteenth weekend. The gross amount increased by about one to three hundred thousand yen each week, from ¥8.44 billion on October 15 to ¥8.66 billion on December 24. By March 17, 2024, the gross in Japan reached ¥8.98 billion ($61 million).

Film journalist Hiroo Ōtaka noted the industry's surprise at the film's rapid box office success despite its unconventional "minimalist promotion" strategy. This success evoked mixed feelings among those within the industry. Distribution representatives told Ōtaka they were concerned that this strategy of not promoting the film threatened their livelihoods and the necessity of traditional advertising methods. In addition to this marketing strategy, Ōtaka identified two important aspects of the film's commercial success. The first is that the deliberate approach of leaving the film by itself capitalized on its existing fan base by generating discussion and interaction on social media. He also mentioned Ghibli's earlier works, regularly featured on Friday Road Show for a decade, indirectly promoted the film.

As of April 15, 2024, the film grossed US$294.2 million. It became the first original anime film and Miyazaki's first film to reach number one at the box office in Canada and the United States, opening with US$5.2 million and grossing US$12.8 million over its first weekend. In China, the film broke a record for foreign animated films, collecting US$23.7 million (CN¥171.5 million) in a single day; it has earned a cumulative US$94 million as of April 15, 2024.

=== Critical response ===
On the review aggregator website Rotten Tomatoes, 96% of 275 critics' reviews are positive, with an average rating of 8.50/10. The website's consensus reads: "Soulfully exploring thought-provoking themes through a beautifully animated lens, The Boy and the Heron is another Miyazaki masterpiece." On Metacritic, the film has a weighted average score of 91 out of 100 based on 55 critic reviews, indicating "universal acclaim". Audiences polled by CinemaScore gave the English-dubbed version of the film an average grade of "A−" on an A+ to F scale.

Although initial reactions to the film were described as "mixed", (Note: Deadline Hollywood reported that initial Japanese reactions to the film were "mixed but mostly favourable", while Digital Spy reported that they were "decidedly mixed".) with reviewers finding it abundantly detailed and laden with meaning, (Note: Attributed to multiple references:) the film quickly garnered critical acclaim in Japan. (Note: Attributed to multiple references:) Film site Eiga Channel praised the film as one of Ghibli's finest in terms of visuals and storytelling, but pointed out that non-Ghibli enthusiasts might find the rapid scene transitions confusing. Film and culture magazine Cinemas+ observed that the film draws on motifs and characters from throughout Miyazaki's career, embedding them in a narrative that is somewhat darker, more complex, and more personal than many of his works. Similarly, Time Out Japan hailed the film as "a mature, complex masterpiece, weaving together the director's past, present, and future – a beautiful enigma that promises to be worth the wait". Cezary Jan Strusiewicz from Polygon found the fantasy elements to be "absolutely beautiful, and they naturally include shots of the classic impossibly delicious-looking Ghibli food", and wrote that people "can watch this movie over and over, always finding something new and exciting in it". He stated that there is a nostalgic longing for the past that evokes the impression of a director reflecting on their career before stepping away, and this underlines "the makings of a perfect swan song". In his review for The Japan Times, Matt Schley awarded the film a rating of 4.5 out of 5 stars, writing that while its place within his list of favorite Miyazaki works remains uncertain, there were moments that left him breathless. While acknowledging the film's complexity and potential to not resonate with all viewers, Full Frontal author Matteo Watzky regarded these qualities as its best aspects, showcasing Miyazaki's talent, subtlety, and imagination.

First international reviews were "unanimously positive". Caryn James of the BBC, who rated it 5 out of 5 stars, felt the "most expansive and magisterial" Miyazaki film "amounts to a summing up of many strands of his long career" and its pace "never slows, and there is too much coming at Mahito for anyone to absorb in a single viewing". Tomris Laffly, writing for TheWrap, epitomized the film as a "swan song so personal, artful and ultimately timeless" and thought it was "the deepest and darkest Studio Ghibli film" since Grave of the Fireflies. David Ehrlich of IndieWire, who gave the film an "A" rating, wrote that the film "finds Miyazaki so nakedly bidding adieu—to us, and to the crumbling kingdom of dreams and madness that he'll soon leave behind—that it somehow resolves into an even more fitting goodbye [than The Wind Rises], one graced with the divine awe and heart-stopping wistfulness of watching a true immortal make peace with their own death". IGN's Rafael Motamayor reviewed The Boy and the Heron as Ghibli's "most visually complex film" and awarded it a score of 9 out of 10, where he expressed how Miyazaki has delivered an exceptional conclusion to his distinguished career through an animated adventure that reminds audiences of their fortune to witness Studio Ghibli's cinematic creations. On a less positive side, The Guardian writer Radheyan Simonpillai, assigning the film 3 out of 5 stars, saw it as "a gentler and slower though no less soulful addition to his canon".

The film is featured in lists of best anime films by several publications. (Note: Multiple references:) Looper ranked it number 10 on its list of top fifty PG-13 films and Collider named it the best fantasy film of the 2020s. In June 2025, IndieWire ranked the film at number 5 on its list of the "100 Best Movies of the 2020s (So Far)". The next month, it was one of the films voted for the "Readers' Choice" edition of The New York Times' list of the 100 best films of the century, finishing at number 290.

=== Accolades ===
Award ceremony	Date of ceremony	Category	Nominee(s)	Result	Ref.
Toronto International Film Festival	September 17, 2023	People's Choice Award	The Boy and the Heron	2nd Runner-up	
Golden Globe Awards	January 7, 2024	Best Animated Feature Film	The Boy and the Heron	Won (Note: It became the first non-English-language animated film to receive the prize.)	
Golden Globe Awards	January 7, 2024	Best Original Score	Joe Hisaishi	Nominated	
Annie Awards	February 17, 2024	Best Animated Feature	The Boy and the Heron	Nominated	
Annie Awards	February 17, 2024	Outstanding Achievement for Directing in a Feature Production	Hayao Miyazaki	Nominated	
Annie Awards	February 17, 2024	Outstanding Achievement for Writing in a Feature Production	Hayao Miyazaki	Nominated	
Annie Awards	February 17, 2024	Outstanding Achievement for Storyboarding in a Feature Production	Hayao Miyazaki	Won	
Annie Awards	February 17, 2024	Outstanding Achievement for Character Animation in an Animated Feature Production	Takeshi Honda	Won	
Annie Awards	February 17, 2024	Outstanding Achievement for Music in a Feature Production	Joe Hisaishi	Nominated	
Annie Awards	February 17, 2024	Outstanding Achievement for Production Design in an Animated Feature Production	Yōji Takeshige	Nominated	
British Academy Film Awards	February 18, 2024	Best Animated Film	Hayao Miyazaki and Toshio Suzuki	Won	
Academy Awards	March 10, 2024	Best Animated Feature	Hayao Miyazaki and Toshio Suzuki	Won (Note: It is the second non-English language film to win the award after Spirited Away.)	

== Impact ==
After the film's release, the novel How Do You Live? was temporarily in short supply due to the "synergy" with the film. The publisher decided to reprint the book, while the volumes were listed in large quantities on Mercari marketplace app. On July 20, Iwanami Shoten announced on its official Twitter account that the total circulation of the book had reached 1.8 million copies, making it the number one book published by Iwanami Bunko in its history. The Hollywood Reporter's Gavin J Blair felt that The Boy and the Heron is a significant contributor to the recent revival of Japanese popular culture in the West, alongside Godzilla Minus One (2023), the first season of One Piece (2023), and the first season of Shōgun (2024).
