= Welcome to Ethics Class =

Japanese manga series

- First tankōbon volume cover

ここは今から倫理です。 (Koko wa Ima kara Rinri Desu)
- Manga
- Written by: Shiori Amase
- Published by: Shueisha
- English publisher: Shueisha (digital)
- Imprint: Young Jump Comics
- Magazine: Grand Jump Premium; (April 26, 2017 – October 31, 2018); Grand Jump Mucha; (December 26, 2018 – August 27, 2025)
- Original run: April 26, 2017 – August 27, 2025
- Volumes: 10
- Television drama
- Directed by: Tetsuya Watanabe; Michi Ono; Yōhei Ono
- Written by: Aya Takaha
- Music by: Taro Umebayashi
- Original network: NHK General TV
- Original run: January 16, 2021 – March 13, 2021
- Episodes: 8

Welcome to Ethics Class (ここは今から倫理です。, Koko wa Ima kara Rinri Desu; lit. 'From now on we begin ethics') is a Japanese manga series written and illustrated by Shiori Amase. The series was initially published as a one-shot in Shueisha's Grand Jump Premium magazine in October 2016, before being serialized in the same magazine in April 2017. It later transferred to the Grand Jump Mucha magazine in December 2018 and ended in August 2025. A live-action television drama adaptation aired from January to March 2021.

== Plot ==
The series is centered around an ethics teacher named Takayanagi. Takayanagi uses ethics to guide his students on whatever issues they're facing and help improve their outlook on life.

== Media ==
=== Manga ===
Written and illustrated by Shiori Amase, Welcome to Ethics Class was initially published as a one-shot in Shueisha's Grand Jump Premium magazine on October 26, 2016. It began serialization in the same magazine on April 26, 2017. It was later transferred to the newly established Grand Jump Mucha magazine on December 26, 2018. The series ended serialization on August 27, 2025. Its chapters have been compiled into ten volumes as of November 2025. Shueisha began publishing the manga in English on its Manga Million digital platform in 2026.

No.	Release date	ISBN
1	November 22, 2017	978-4-08-890791-8
2	June 19, 2018	978-4-08-891056-7
3	April 19, 2019	978-4-08-891261-5
4	February 19, 2020	978-4-08-891487-9
5	December 18, 2020	978-4-08-891740-5
6	June 18, 2021	978-4-08-892024-5
7	June 17, 2022	978-4-08-892348-2
8	August 18, 2023	978-4-08-892808-1
9	May 17, 2024	978-4-08-893370-2
10	November 19, 2025	978-4-08-894021-2

=== Drama ===
A live-action television drama adaptation was announced on February 19, 2020. The drama starred Yuki Yamada as Takayanagi, and was directed by Tetsuya Watanabe, Michi Ono, and Yōhei Ono with scripts written by Aya Takaha and music composed by Taro Umebayashi. It aired from January 16 to March 13, 2021, on NHK General TV.

== Reception ==
The series was nominated for the 4th Next Manga Awards in 2018 in the print category and was ranked 7th. The series was ranked 12th, along with Efu no Shichinin, on Takarajimasha's Kono Manga ga Sugoi! 2019 ranking of top 20 manga for male readers. The series was ranked 14th in the Nationwide Bookstore Employees' Recommended Comics of 2021.

== See also ==
- All Out!!, another manga series by Shiori Amase
