= Narumi Yasuda =

Japanese actress (born 1966)

- Born: 28 November 1966 (age 59); Tokyo, Japan
- Occupation: Actress
- Years active: 1982–present
- Spouse: Noritake Kinashi (m. 1994)

Narumi Yasuda (安田 成美, Yasuda Narumi; born 28 November 1966) is a Japanese actress. She won the award for best actress at the 8th Yokohama Film Festival for Inujini seshi mono, Minami e Hashire, Umi no Michi o! and Sorobanzuku. She also won the award for best actress at the 13th Hochi Film Award for Bakayaro! I'm Plenty Mad.

Yasuda was born in Tokyo. She was the winner of a competition to find a singer to sing the theme song and promote Hayao Miyazaki's anime film Nausicaä of the Valley of the Wind, "Kaze no Tani no Naushika", written by Takashi Matsumoto and composed by Haruomi Hosono.

== Selected filmography ==
=== Films ===
- Inujini seshi mono (1986)
- Minami e Hashire, Umi no Michi o! (1986)
- Sorobanzuku (1986)
- Bakayaro! I'm Plenty Mad (1988)
- My Soul Is Slashed (1991)
- Time Traveller: The Girl Who Leapt Through Time (2010)
- Fukushima 50 (2020)
- Under the Open Sky (2021)

=== Television ===
- Sugao no Mama De (1992), Yumiko Kosaka
- Teppan (2010–2011), Machiko Murakami
- Totto TV (2016), Cho Kuroyanagi
- Miotsukushi Ryōrichō (2017)

=== Dubbing ===
- The Good Dinosaur, Momma Ida
