= His Motorbike, Her Island =

1986 Japanese film

- Theatrical release poster
- 彼のオートバイ、彼女の島
- Directed by: Nobuhiko Obayashi
- Screenplay by: Ikuo Sekimoto
- Based on: Kare no ōtobai, kanojo no shima by Yoshio Kataoka
- Produced by: Haruki Kadokawa; Michio Morioka; Nobuhiko Obayashi
- Starring: Kiwako Harada; Noriko Watanabe; Riki Takeuchi; Ryoichi Takayanagi; Takahiro Tamura; Tomokazu Miura
- Cinematography: Yoshitaka Sakamoto
- Edited by: Nobuhiko Obayashi
- Music by: Naoshi Miyazaki
- Production company: Kadokawa Haruki Jimusho
- Release date: April 26, 1986 (Japan)
- Running time: 90 minutes
- Country: Japan
- Language: Japanese

His Motorbike, Her Island (Japanese: 彼のオートバイ、彼女の島, Hepburn: Kare no ōtobai, kanojo no shima) is a 1986 Japanese romance film directed by Nobuhiko Obayashi, based on a 1977 novel by Yoshio Kataoka. Produced by Kadokawa Haruki Jimusho, the film stars Kiwako Harada, Riki Takeuchi, Noriko Watanabe and Tomokazu Miura. Takeuchi, in his acting debut, plays a motorbike enthusiast who falls in love with a young woman (Harada) after teaching her how to ride. The film frequently switches between black-and-white and color photography.

His Motorbike, Her Island won three awards at the 8th Yokohama Film Festival, including Best Supporting Actress for Watanabe and 3rd Best Film.

== Plot ==
Koh Hashimoto is a student and motorbike enthusiast who has a part-time job delivering copy for a newspaper agency on his Kawasaki W3 motorbike. He claims, "Some guys have vividly colored dreams, but mine were always in monochrome. This is the story of one of those monochrome dreams."

One day, Koh arranges to meet Fuyumi Sawada, a young woman who wants to ride a motorbike. Like Koh, Fuyumi's brother Hidemasa also owns a Kawasaki, but Hidemasa refuses to let her ride it. Koh and Fuyumi go for a nighttime ride on Koh's motorbike. Though the two begin a relationship, Koh eventually breaks up with Fuyumi on the basis that all she does is cry and cook. Koh's decision to leave Fuyumi draws the ire of Hidemasa; Koh and Hidemasa have a jousting duel on their motorbikes, which Koh wins.

Koh meets a young woman named Miyoko Shiraishi, who takes photographs of him and his motorbike. Some time later, Koh crosses paths with Miyoko again at a mountain spa, where he sees her naked. He drives her back to the inn at which she is staying on his motorbike.

A week after the duel between Koh and Hidemasa, Koh agrees to meet Fuyumi at Michikusa, a bar they frequented when they were together. Koh sits down with his friend Keiichi Ogawa at the bar, while Fuyumi tearfully sings a song on the bar stage. At home, Koh receives a letter from Miyoko, with the photos from their first meeting enclosed. Koh and Miyoko talk on the telephone, and Miyoko invites Koh to visit her island in the Inland Sea, where she will soon be going home for the Obon Festival. Koh travels with his Kawasaki to Miyoko's island on a ferry, and he lets her try riding the motorbike by herself. At night, Koh and Miyoko go with Miyoko's father to the Bon dance in town. By the sea, Koh and Miyoko discuss Koh's love for his motorbike and Miyoko's desire to ride it, and the two kiss.

Back on the mainland, Koh and Miyoko accompany Ogawa—who is now dating Fuyumi—to Michikusa, where Koh learns that Fuyumi has become the bar's resident singer-songwriter. Ogawa and Koh head out into the night on their motorbikes so that Ogawa can smash the side mirrors of passing cars with a wrench. Afterwards, they return to Michikusa, where Koh discovers that Miyoko was riding behind them the whole time on one of Ogawa's other motorbikes.

Koh and Miyoko's romance continues to develop as he teaches her how to ride a motorbike. One day, when Hidemasa declares Miyo a biker prodigy, Koh fears that she is destined to crash. After returning from work one night, Koh sees that Miyoko has ridden off on a motorbike alone. When she returns, he angrily confronts her for riding without her license; she argues that he does not like her riding motorbikes, and is jealous of her fondness for them. They fight, and Koh tells her that she will die riding motorbikes, to which she responds that she would have no regrets if that were to happen.

Six months later, Fuyumi is pregnant with Ogawa's baby, and Miyoko has disappeared and taken Koh's Kawasaki with her. From letters written to Koh and Fuyumi, Koh learns that Miyoko has returned to her island. Koh goes back to the island to reunite with her, and they kiss. One day, while riding their motorbikes together in the rain, Koh and Miyoko agree to meet up at a restaurant. Koh reaches the restaurant first and overhears a group of bikers talking about an accident. They say a woman on a motorbike swerved to avoid a hare in the road, and that she crashed into a truck and was killed instantly. Koh sees Miyoko outside the restaurant, and she apologizes for being late. Koh states, "She was there from one summer to the next. She became my story." They take a photo behind a motorbike together in a field.

== Cast ==
- Kiwako Harada as Miyoko Shiraishi
- Riki Takeuchi as Koh Hashimoto
- Noriko Watanabe as Fuyumi Sawada
- Tomokazu Miura as Hidemasa Sawada
- Ryōichi Takayanagi as Keiichi Ogawa
- Takahiro Tamura as Kouichiroh Shiraishi

== Themes ==
James Balmont of Another Magazine cited His Motorbike, Her Island as an example of a film with a relatively sympathetic view towards bōsōzoku, a Japanese youth subculture associated with motorcycles. Balmont describes Koh's Kawasaki motorbike as "more of a symbol for freedom than anarchy", and writes: "From the opening shots, in which the camera fetishises the bike chassis in close-up as the engine gently purrs and rumbles, the bike is a beloved object that brings Koh in touch with the resplendent natural surroundings of Japan's countryside as well as stoking a blossoming romance."

== Awards ==
Year	Award	Category	Recipient	Result
1986	8th Yokohama Film Festival	Best Supporting Actress	Noriko Watanabe	Won
1986	8th Yokohama Film Festival	Best Newcomer	Kiwako Harada	Won
1986	8th Yokohama Film Festival	3rd Best Film	His Motorbike, Her Island	Won

== Home media ==
On 17 October 2022, Third Window Films released His Motorbike, Her Island on Blu-ray in Region B as part of the four-disc box set Nobuhiko Obayashi's 80s Kadokawa Years.
