= Miki Imai (singer) =

Japanese pop singer and actress (born 1963)

Miki Imai 今井 美樹
- Born: 14 April 1963 (age 63); Takanabe, Miyazaki, Japan
- Genres: Pop
- Occupations: Singer, actress, voice actress
- Years active: 1986–present
- Labels: For Life, Warner, Virgin
- Website: www.imai-miki.net

Miki Imai (今井 美樹, Imai Miki; born 14 April 1963) is a female Japanese pop singer and actress. She won the award for best newcomer at the 8th Yokohama Film Festival for Inuji ni Seshi Mono.

== Personal life ==
She married guitarist Tomoyasu Hotei on 6 June 1999. The couple's daughter was born on 26 July 2002. The family resides in London.

== Discography ==
=== Albums ===
- Femme (5 December 1986)
- Elfin (21 September 1987)
- Bewith (21 June 1988)
- Fiesta (7 December 1988)
- Mocha (21 June 1989)
- Ivory (6 December 1989)
- Retour (29 August 1990)
- Lluvia (7 September 1991)
- Flow into Space (23 December 1992)
- Ivory II (10 November 1993)
- Flow into Space Live '93 (17 December 1993)
- A Place in the Sun (2 September 1994)
- A Place in the Sun Live (5 April 1995)
- Love of My Life (28 July 1995)
- Thank You (21 June 1996)
- Pride (16 July 1997)
- "Moment" PRIDE-LIVE (25 March 1998)
- Imai Miki from 1986 (1 July 1998)
- Mirai (26 November 1998)
- Blooming Ivory (14 April 2000)
- Taiyō to Heminguuei (23 August 2000)
- Imai Miki Tour 2000 in Club hemingway (21 February 2001)
- Aqua (22 August 2001)
- Goodbye Yesterday – The Best of Miki Imai - (24 April 2002)
- Pearl (17 July 2002)
- One Night at the Chapel (7 November 2002)
- Escape (27 August 2003)
- Ivory III (16 June 2004)
- She is (3 November 2004)
- Dream Tour Final at Budokan 2004 (16 March 2005)
- 20051211IVory (22 February 2006)
- Milestone (22 November 2006)
- I Love a Piano (14 February 2008)
- Corridor (25 November 2009)
- Dialogue: Miki Imai Sings Yuming Classics (9 October 2013)
- Colour (20 May 2015)
- Classic Ivory 35th Anniversary Orchestral Best (11 November 2020)
- smile (11 February 2026)

=== Singles ===
- "Tasogare no Monorogu" (21 May 1986)
- "Yasei no Kaze" (1 July 1987)
- "Shizuka ni Kita Sorichudo" (5 March 1988)
- "Kanojo to Tip on Duo" (17 August 1988)
- "Boogie-Woogie Lonesome High-Heel" (17 May 1989)
- "Hitomi ga Hohoemukara" (8 November 1989)
- "Piece of My Wish" (7 November 1991)
- "Blue Moon Blue" (6 November 1992)
- "Bluebird" (28 July 1993)
- "Miss You" (18 July 1994)
- "Ruby" (12 July 1995)
- "Pride" (4 November 1996)
- "Drive ni Tsuretette" (18 June 1997)
- "Watashi wa Anata no Sora ni Naritai/Shiro no Warutsu" (21 November 1997)
- "flowers" (28 October 1998)
- "Kōri no Yōni Hohoende/Smiling Girls" (13 January 1999)
- "Sleep My Dear" (19 May 1999)
- "Goodbye Yesterday" (9 February 2000)
- "Tsukiyo no Koibitotachi" (24 May 2000)
- "Shiosai" (25 July 2001)
- "Hohoemi no Hito" (9 May 2002)
- "Honto no Kimochi" (30 July 2003)
- "Omoide ni Sasayagu" (14 October 2004)
- "Ai no Uta" (27 July 2005)
- "Toshishita no Suifu" (25 October 2006)
- "Inori" (7 November 2007)
- "Ashiato" (9 April 2008)
- "Takaramono" (16 September 2009)
- "Hitohira" (28 October 2009)

=== DVD ===
- Miki Imai A-Live: For Retour (18 October 2000)
- Miki Imai Peace Clips (18 October 2000)
- Tour de Miki: Flow into Space Live (18 October 2000)
- A Place in the Sun Films (18 October 2000)
- Profile (18 October 2000)
- Love of My Life Films (18 October 2000)
- Thank You (18 October 2000)
- Monument (18 October 2000)
- Goodbye Yesterday and Hello Tomorrow (24 January 2001)
- Imai Miki Tour 1999 "Mirai" (24 January 2001)
- Imai Miki Tour 2000 In Club Hemingway (21 February 2001)
- Hohoemi no Hito (19 September 2002)
- One Night at the Chapel (7 November 2002)
- Miki Imai Live at Orchard Hall (4 August 2004)
- Dream Tour Final at Budokan 2004 (16 March 2005)
- Tonight's Live Ivory (22 February 2006)
- 20th Anniversary Concert "Milestone" (7 November 2007)

=== Video ===
- Passage (21 October 1987)
- Miki Imai A-Live: For Retour (21 December 1990)
- Miki Imai Peace Clips (17 September 1993)
- Tour de Miki: Flow into Space Live (18 March 1994)
- A Place in the Sun Films (18 November 1994)
- Profile (21 April 1995)
- Love Of My Life films (20 October 1995)
- Thank You (21 June 1996)
- Monument (25 March 1998)
- Goodbye Yesterday and Hello Tomorrow (24 January 2001)
- Imai Miki Tour 1999 "Mirai" (24 January 2001)
- Imai Miki Tour 2000 In Club Hemingway (21 February 2001)

== Filmography ==
Dramas
| Year | Drama | Role |
|---|---|---|
| 1990 | Omoide ni Kaeru Made | Sawamura Ruriko |
| 1991 | Ashita ga Aru Kara | |
| 1999 | Yomigaeru Kinro | Saeki Yuri |
| 2000 | Brand | Kawashima Midori |
Film
| Year | Title | Role |
| 1986 | Inujini Sesi Mono | Chika |
| 1991 | Only Yesterday | Taeko (voice) |
| 2007 | Walking My Life (Zou no Senaka) | Fujiyama Miwako |
| 2021 | A Day with No Name | |

== See also ==
- List of best-selling music artists in Japan
