= Minami e Hashire, Umi no Michi o! =

Minami e hashire, umi no michi o!
- DVD cover

Japanese name
- Kanji: 南へ走れ、海の道を！
- Directed by: Seiji Izumi
- Screenplay by: Seiji Izumi
- Based on: Minami e Hashire, Umi no Michi o! by Ryūzō Saki
- Produced by: Hisao Nabeshima; Jun'ichi Shindō
- Starring: Kōichi Iwaki; Narumi Yasuda
- Cinematography: Yasushi Sasakibara
- Edited by: Jun Nabeshima
- Music by: Masanori Sasaji
- Production companies: Shochiku-Fuji Company; Tohokushinsha Film; Soeishinsha Company; Japan Audio Visual Network
- Distributed by: Shochiku
- Release date: August 30, 1986 (Japan)
- Running time: 105 minutes
- Country: Japan
- Language: Japanese

Minami e Hashire, Umi no Michi o! (Japanese: 南へ走れ、海の道を！), also known as South to the Horizon, is a 1986 Japanese film directed by Seiji Izumi.

== Awards ==
8th Yokohama Film Festival

- Won: Best Actor - Kōichi Iwaki
- Won: Best Actress - Narumi Yasuda
- Won: Best Cinematography
