= How Do You Live? =

1937 novel by Yoshino Genzaburō

- Re-release cover from 2017, with art by Shoichi Haga
- Author: Genzaburō Yoshino
- Original title: 君たちはどう生きるか
- Language: Japanese
- Set in: Senior High School at Otsuka
- Publisher: Shinchosha
- Publication date: 1937
- Publication place: Japan
- Pages: 298

How Do You Live? (Japanese: 君たちはどう生きるか, Hepburn: Kimi-tachi wa Dō Ikiru ka) is a 1937 novel by Genzaburō Yoshino.

== Plot ==
The story alternates viewpoint and storytelling between Koperu and his uncle. Koperu describes his life in school. His uncle narrates his experiences helping his nephew deal with bullying and other struggles. The former is a fifteen-year-old junior high school student, known by his nickname Koperu, after the astronomer Nicholas Copernicus. He is athletic and academically gifted, and popular at school. Koperu lives alone with his mother since his father, a bank executive, died when he was young. His mother's brother lives nearby and visits frequently, and Koperu and his uncle are very close. Koperu shares about his life, and his uncle gives him support and advice. His uncle also documents and comments on these interactions in a diary, with the intent to eventually give the diary to Koperu. The diary writing, which is interspersed with the narrative, provides insight into the ethical and emotional trials that Koperu shared with his uncle. The diary entries, which cover themes such as "view of things", "structure of society", "relation", etc. are in the style of a note written to Koperu.

Thinking like Copernicus that our Earth is a celestial body moving within the vastness of space, or thinking that our Earth is fixed at the center of the universe, are two ways of thinking that, in reality, are not only related to astronomy. Even when we think about things like the world around us or our own lives, the truth is that we are still revolving around them after all.

— About view of things (Uncle's note)

Ultimately, Koperu writes a decision about his future way of living as a reply to his uncle, and the novel ends with the narrator asking "How will you live?".

== Background ==
Yūzō Yamamoto was originally tasked with writing the final novel in the serial Nihon Shoukokumin Bunko. However, he was unable to due to illness. Instead Genzaburō Yoshino wrote How Do You Live? in his stead and published the book in 1937. In the first edition Yamamoto is Co-author but in the revision after the war 1948 Yoshino alone is credited as Author.

After the conclusion of World War II, the book underwent several changes such as vocabulary and was republished in 1945 by Mira-sha Publishers. In practice, that meant removing mentions of imperialism, criticism of capitalism, unpatriotic behaviour, and references to the problems of class. The English translation from 2021 is based on the original.

How Do You Live? is a popular work of literature in classical arts education and is often considered as a part of children's literature.

== Characters ==
- Junichi Honda/Koperu – A 15-year-old boy who experiences the ups and downs of school life, friendships, and finding his place in the world.

== Publication ==
This book is one of the "Nihon Shoukokumin Bunko" series that intended to convey knowledge and ideas of free and progressive culture to school children in Japan (Shoukokumin literally means younger citizens). However, many of the works were discouraged by the rise of Japanese militarism in 1930s.

Political scientist Masao Maruyama praised the composition in which a child named Koperu observes reality and naturally portrays the process of discovering various things. He also commends how this complements the main character's discoveries, which are conveyed in the form of letters from the child's uncle. Moreover, the question "How Do You Live?" which is also the title of this book is not only the ethical problem of "how to live", but also about the kind of social scientific awareness to live. It is evaluating the problem of existing.

According to author Yoshino Genzaburō, How Do You Live? was not originally conceived as a literary work, but was intended as a book on ethics. However, according to Takada Riko, this book is also a liberal arts theory written for students of former junior high school during the height of culturalism. Takada focused on the privileged family environment and the "high" social class of the heroes. Those were drawn by the author, who was inspired by the people during his time at Takashi Associated Junior High School (now a high school attached to the University of Tsukuba). He mentioned that this book is intended to resonate with educated boys, which, during that era, was a limited number of privileged citizens.

== Manga adaptation ==
In 2017, the book was serialized in manga form by Shoichi Haga and saw publication by Magazine House under the title How Do You Live? Cartoon Stories.

== Miyazaki film ==
The novel appears in one important scene of the Studio Ghibli animated film, also titled How Do You Live? in Japan, but released internationally as The Boy and the Heron (2023). The film, which also features a young male protagonist, also deals glancingly with bullying and has existential themes, but is not an adaptation or related to it in terms of plot. The release of the film led to increased sales and reprints of the book in Japan. It was sold in large quantities in the Mercari marketplace app. Iwanami Shoten announced that the total circulation of the book reached 1.8 million copies, making it the number one book on Iwanami Bunko.

== English translation ==
The book was translated into English by Bruno Navasky, and published in 2021 by Algonquin Young Readers, in the UK by Rider Books including A Note from the Translator. In a foreword, Neil Gaiman (who had adapted the original dialog for Hayao Miyazaki's earlier film Princess Mononoke) discusses how that director was inspired by the book in producing his then-upcoming film, The Boy and the Heron:

Books like this are important. I'm so glad, Mr Miyazaki is making his film, not least because it means that, eighty-four years after it was written, Genzaburō Yoshino's novel can be read in English, in Bruno Navasky's gentle and winning translation ...
