= Noriko Watanabe =

Japanese actress and singer (born 1965)

- Born: July 22, 1965 (age 60); Kitakyushu, Fukuoka, Japan
- Occupation: Actress
- Years active: 1982–present
- Spouse: Hiroshi Nishioka (m. 1995–1998)

Noriko Watanabe (渡辺 典子, Watanabe Noriko; born 22 July 1965 in Kitakyushu, Fukuoka, Japan) is a Japanese actress and singer. She won the award for best supporting actress at the 8th Yokohama Film Festival for His Motorbike, Her Island.

== Filmography ==
| Title | Date | Role | Notes |
|---|---|---|---|
| Ninja Wars | 1982 | Kagaribi | |
| Tsumiki Kuzushi | 1983 | Yuko Honami | Japan Academy Prize for Newcomer of the Year |
| His Motorbike, Her Island | 1986 | Fuyumi Sawada | Yokohama Film Festival Award for Best Supporting Actress |
| Bloom in the Moonlight | 1993 | Kume Yui | |
| Godzilla: Tokyo S.O.S. | 2003 | Shun's mother | |
| Umizaru | 2004 | Miyuki Sonobe | |
| Threads Of Destiny | 2008 | Sachiko Takemiya | |
| Mio's Cookbook | 2020 | Omitsu | |

== See also ==
- Hiroko Yakushimaru
- Tomoyo Harada
