= Kaoru Kobayashi (actor) =

Japanese actor (born 1951)

- Born: September 4, 1951 (age 75); Kyoto, Kyoto Prefecture, Japan
- Occupation: Actor
- Years active: 1971–present
- Spouse(s): Kumi Nakamura (1984–1995); Koume (2009–)
- Children: 1

Kaoru Kobayashi (小林 薫, Kobayashi Kaoru; born on September 4, 1951) is a Japanese actor born in Kyoto. He won best actor at the 30th Yokohama Film Festival and best-supporting actor at the 8th Yokohama Film Festival for Sorobanzuku.

== Career ==
Kobayashi starred in Yoichi Sai's Quill. He also appeared in Yuya Ishii's The Great Passage He appeared as "Master", the lead character in the Japanese TV series Midnight Diner and the two full-length films based on the series.

== Filmography ==
=== Film ===
Year	Title	Role	Notes	Ref.
1979	18sai, umi e			
1983	The Second Love	Hideo Hyuga		
1986	Sorobanzuku			
1997	Princess Mononoke	Jiko-bō (voice)		
1999	Himitsu	Heisuke Sugita	Leading role	
1999	The Black House			
1999	Coquille	Tatsuya Urayama	Leading role	
2004	Quill		Leading role	
2013	The Great Passage	Araki		
2015	Midnight Diner	The Master	Leading role	
2016	Midnight Diner 2	The Master	Leading role	
2019	The Island of Cats	Iwao		
2020	Independence of Japan	Shigeru Yoshida		
2021	We Made a Beautiful Bouquet	Hirotarō Yamane		
2021	Arc			
2022	Yes, I Can't Swim	Professor Kamoshita		
2022	A Winter Rose			
2022	Dr. Coto's Clinic 2022	Shōichi Hoshino		
2023	Trapped Balloon	Shigezō Kojima		
2023	Baian the Assassin, M.D.	Tsuyama Etsudō		
2023	Baian the Assassin, M.D. 2	Tsuyama Etsudō		
2023	Tsugaru Lacquer Girl	Miyako's father		
2023	Kubi	Tokugawa Ieyasu		
2023	The Boy and the Heron	Old Pelican (voice)		
2024	The Yin Yang Master Zero	Fujiwara no Yoshisuke		
2024	Promised Land	Shimoyama		
2025	Sham	Toshio Yugamidani		
2025	The Last Blossom	The current Minoru Akutsu (voice)	Leading role	

=== Television ===
Year	Title	Role	Notes	Ref.
1982	Tōge no Gunzō	Fuwa Kazuemon	Taiga drama	
2003–2006	Dr. Coto's Clinic	Shoichi Hoshino	2 seasons	
2009–2026	Midnight Diner	The Master	Leading role; 4 seasons	
2011	Carnation	Zensaku Ohara	Asadora	
2015	The Emperor's Cook	Kaneichi Usami		
2016–2019	Midnight Diner: Tokyo Stories	The Master	Leading role; 2 seasons	
2017	Naotora: The Lady Warlord	Reverend Nankei	Taiga drama	
2021	Reach Beyond the Blue Sky	Shibusawa Ichirōemon	Taiga drama	
2021	Kyojo 2	Takeshi Shindo	Miniseries	
2023	The Days	Furuya		
2023	Kazama Kimichika: Kyojo Zero	Takeshi Shindo		
2023	Fixer	Deputy prime minister Ichirō Suzaki		
2024	The Tiger and Her Wings	Shigechika Hodaka	Asadora	
2025	1972: Nagisa no Keika	Taiei Tamashiro	Miniseries	
2025	Pray Speak What Has Happened	Taro Furosu		

=== Dubbing ===
- The West Wing (seasons 1-4), Josiah Bartlet (Martin Sheen)

== Awards and nominations ==
Year	Award	Category	Work(s)	Result	Ref.
1979	4th Hochi Film Award	Best New Artist	18sai, umi e	Won	
1986	9th Japan Academy Film Prize	Best Supporting Actor	Sorekara and Love Letter	Won	
1987	8th Yokohama Film Festival	Best Supporting Actor	Sorobanzuku	Won	
2000	23rd Japan Academy Film Prize	Best Actor	Himitsu	Nominated	
2008	31st Japan Academy Film Prize	Best Supporting Actor	Tokyo Tower: Mom and Me, and Sometimes Dad	Won	
2009	30th Yokohama Film Festival	Best Actor	Kyūka and Kanki no Uta	Won	
