= Inuji ni Seshi Mono =

Inujini seshi mono
- DVD cover

Japanese name
- Kanji: 犬死にせしもの
- Directed by: Kazuyuki Izutsu
- Starring: Hiroyuki Sanada; Koichi Sato; Narumi Yasuda; Miki Imai
- Production company: Director's Company
- Release date: 1986
- Country: Japan
- Language: Japanese

Inujini ni Seshi Mono (Japanese: 犬死にせしもの), also known as One Who Died in Vain, is a 1986 Japanese film directed by Kazuyuki Izutsu.

== Awards ==
8th Yokohama Film Festival

- Won: Best Actress - Narumi Yasuda
- Won: Best Newcomer - Miki Imai
- 5th Best Film
