= Sorobanzuku =

Japanese name
- Kana: そろばんずく
- Directed by: Yoshimitsu Morita
- Written by: Yoshimitsu Morita
- Starring: Narumi Yasuda; Kaoru Kobayashi
- Release date: August 23, 1986
- Country: Japan
- Language: Japanese

Sorobanzuku (そろばんずく) is a 1986 Japanese film directed by Yoshimitsu Morita.

== Awards ==
8th Yokohama Film Festival

- Won: Best Screenplay – Yoshimitsu Morita
- Won: Best Actress – Narumi Yasuda
- Won: Best Supporting Actor – Kaoru Kobayashi
- 10th Best Film
