= Wotakoi: Love Is Hard for Otaku =

Japanese manga series and its adaptations

- First tankōbon volume cover, featuring Hirotaka Nifuji (left) and Narumi Momose (right)

ヲタクに恋は難しい (Wotaku ni Koi wa Muzukashii)
- Genre: Romantic comedy
- Manga
- Written by: Fujita
- Published by: Ichijinsha
- English publisher: NA: Kodansha USA
- Magazine: Pixiv; Comic Pool (November 6, 2015 – July 16, 2021)
- Original run: April 17, 2014 – July 16, 2021
- Volumes: 11
- Anime television series
- Directed by: Yoshimasa Hiraike
- Produced by: Kenta Suzuki; Naokado Fujiyama
- Written by: Yoshimasa Hiraike
- Music by: Akimitsu Honma
- Studio: A-1 Pictures
- Licensed by: Amazon Prime Video (expired)
- Original network: Fuji TV (noitaminA)
- Original run: April 13, 2018 – June 22, 2018
- Episodes: 11
- Original video animation
- Directed by: Yoshimasa Hiraike (1); Yayoi Takano (2–3)
- Produced by: Kazuki Ōshima
- Written by: Yoshimasa Hiraike (1); Teruko Utsumi (2–3)
- Music by: Akimitsu Honma; Yayoi Sekimukai (2–3)
- Studio: A-1 Pictures (1); Lapin Track (2–3)
- Released: March 29, 2019 – October 14, 2021
- Episodes: 3
- Live-action film
- Wotakoi: Love Is Hard for Otaku (2020)
- icon

Wotakoi: Love Is Hard for Otaku (Japanese: ヲタクに恋は難しい, Hepburn: Wotaku ni Koi wa Muzukashii) is a Japanese web manga series written and illustrated by Fujita. It was first posted on Pixiv in April 2014. It began serialization in Comic Pool, a joint web manga publication project by Ichijinsha and Pixiv, in November 2015. Ichijinsha began publishing the manga in print in April 2015 and 11 tankōbon volumes were published. It tells the story of Narumi Momose, an otaku and fujoshi trying to keep her secret at a new job, who ends up rekindling a friendship and starting a romance with her old classmate Hirotaka Nifuji, a fellow otaku.

An anime television series adaptation produced by A-1 Pictures aired from April to June 2018 on Fuji TV's Noitamina programming block, while a live-action film adaptation premiered in February 2020.

By August 2020, the manga had over 10 million copies in circulation, including digital editions.

== Plot ==
The main characters are Narumi Momose, an office lady who hides her fujoshi lifestyle, and Hirotaka Nifuji, a handsome and capable company man who is a game otaku. The two seem perfect for each other, but love is difficult for otaku.

== Characters ==
Narumi Momose (桃瀬 成海, Momose Narumi)
Voiced by: Arisa Date
Portrayed by: Mitsuki Takahata
Narumi is a fujoshi and otaku who also likes otome games and idols. She blames being an otaku for difficulties in her life and attempts to keep it a secret, especially at work. Narumi is also the childhood friend and girlfriend of Hirotaka Nifuji.
Hirotaka Nifuji (二藤 宏嵩, Nifuji Hirotaka)
Voiced by: Kent Itō, Mutsumi Tamura (young)
Portrayed by: Kento Yamazaki
Hirotaka is Narumi Momose's otaku boyfriend who has been in love with her ever since childhood. He is a gamer otaku who spends most of his free time gaming. Unlike Narumi, Hirotaka does not care if everyone knows that he is an otaku. He is also considered to be very attractive by the ladies, although he does not seem to care.
Hanako Koyanagi (小柳 花子, Koyanagi Hanako)
Voiced by: Miyuki Sawashiro
Portrayed by: Nanao
Hanako is Narumi's senpai at the office. She is secretly a famous cosplayer otaku who usually cosplays as male characters. Hanako also plays games and reads yaoi manga. She is married to Taro Kabakura.
Taro Kabakura (樺倉 太郎, Kabakura Tarō)
Voiced by: Tomokazu Sugita
Portrayed by: Takumi Saitoh
Taro is Hirotaka Nifuji's coworker at the office and a less intense otaku. He likes heroes and bishōjo. Taro is married to Hanako.
Naoya Nifuji (二藤 尚哉, Nifuji Naoya)
Voiced by: Yūki Kaji
Naoya is Hirotaka's cheerful younger brother who attends a university. They care for each other very much and Naoya quietly worries about Hirotaka's introverted nature. Unlike his brother, Naoya is terrible at playing video games and not an otaku.
Kou Sakuragi (桜城 光, Sakuragi Kō)
Voiced by: Aoi Yūki
Ko is a socially anxious solo gamer from Naoya's university with a habit of saying "I'm sorry". His reclusive nature initially reminds Naoya of his brother, so he decided to become Ko's gamer friend. Naoya brings her into his group of friends, unaware she is female until later.

== Production ==
Initially, Fujita began posting the manga on Pixiv, a Japanese online community for artists, as a rookie author. Ichijinsha then launched a digital manga magazine with Pixiv titled Comic Pool, and started serializing the manga on a regular basis. The manga was selected for Comic Pool because it was the most popular work on Pixiv. On April 30, 2015, Ichijinsha started the publishing of the manga in print.

== Media ==
=== Manga ===
Written and illustrated by Fujita, Wotakoi was first published on Pixiv on April 17, 2014. It was later published on the digital manga service Comic Pool from November 6, 2015, to July 16, 2021. Ichijinsha collected its chapters in eleven tankōbon volumes, released from April 30, 2015, to October 14, 2021.

In North America, the manga has been licensed for English release by Kodansha USA. It released the manga a two-in-one volume edition, each containing two of the original Japanese volumes, except volume 11—which was released in English as a standalone book labeled as volume 6—as it was the final volume.

==== Volumes ====
No.	Original release date	Original ISBN	English release date	English ISBN
1	April 30, 2015	978-4-75-800846-4	April 17, 2018	978-1-63-236704-4
2	March 31, 2016	978-4-75-800899-0	April 17, 2018	978-1-63-236704-4
3	December 23, 2016	978-4-75-800934-8	June 12, 2018	978-1-63-236705-1
4	July 26, 2017	978-4-75-800951-5	June 12, 2018	978-1-63-236705-1
5	February 2, 2018	978-4-75-800979-9	November 27, 2018	978-1-63-236706-8
6	July 31, 2018	978-4-75-800987-4	November 27, 2018	978-1-63-236706-8
7	March 29, 2019	978-4-75-802019-0; 978-4-75-802020-6 (SP)	October 20, 2020	978-1-63-236861-4
8	December 13, 2019	978-4-75-802058-9	October 20, 2020	978-1-63-236861-4
9	August 5, 2020	978-4-75-802120-3	October 5, 2021	978-1-64-651363-5
10	February 26, 2021	978-4-75-802188-3; 978-4-75-802189-0 (SP)	October 5, 2021	978-1-64-651363-5
11	October 14, 2021	978-4-75-802281-1; 978-4-75-802282-8 (SP)	May 24, 2022 (digital); June 14, 2022 (print)	978-1-64-651474-8

=== Anime ===
An 11-episode anime television series adaptation animated by A-1 Pictures was broadcast on Fuji Television from April 13 to June 22, 2018. (Note: Fuji TV listed the series premiere on April 12 at 24:55, which is effectively April 13 at 12:55 a.m. JST.) Produced by Aniplex, Fuji Television, Ichijinsha, Dentsu, Christmas Holly and Kanetsu Investment, the series was directed by Yoshimasa Hiraike, who also handled series composition. Takahiro Yasuda designed the characters, while Akimitsu Honma composed the music. The opening theme is "Fiction" (フィクション, Fikushon) by Sumika. The first and second endings are respectively "Kimi no Tonari" (キミの隣; lit. 'Next to You') and "Ashita mo Mata" (明日もまた; lit. 'Tomorrow Again Too') (Episode 9), both performed by Halca. Amazon streamed the series on its Amazon Prime Video service. The series ran for eleven episodes. An OVA titled It Appeared Suddenly=Love was released on March 29, 2019, to coincide with the release of the seventh volume of the manga. A second OVA by Lapin Track was released on February 26, 2021, to coincide with the release of the tenth volume of the manga. A third OVA was released on October 14, 2021, to coincide with the release of the eleventh and final volume of the manga.

==== Episodes ====
No.	Title (Note: All English titles are taken from Amazon Prime Video.)	Directed by	Written by	Original release date
1	"Narumi and Hirotaka Meets Again, and…" Transliteration: "Narumi to Hirotaka no saikai. Soshite..." (Japanese: 成海と宏嵩の再会。そして...)	Daisuke Takashima	Yoshimasa Hiraike	April 13, 2018
Narumi Momose, a 26-year-old die-hard yaoi fangirl and otaku, changes jobs to present herself as a perfect young lady. Her hopes are dashed when she reunites with Hirotaka Nifuji, a middle school classmate and avid gamer who knows her secret. They reconnect over alcohol, and Hirotaka promises not to reveal Narumi's geek secret, remarking that love is difficult for people like them because others consider them "abnormal" and "weird". Two weeks later, Narumi invites Hirotaka for drinks again but cannot finish her work on time, so he stays to help her before they go out. While drinking, Hirotaka asks Narumi out, offering to help her pass game levels as a benefit. Narumi excitedly accepts.
2	"Are We Now Dating?"; Transliteration: "Koibito? Hajimemashita" (Japanese: 恋人？始めました)	Matsuo Asami	Yoshimasa Hiraike	April 20, 2018
Narumi befriends Hanako Koyanagi, her coworker and a famous nerd who specializes in cosplay. Hirotaka notices Narumi avoiding him at work because she is unsure how to interact with him now that they are in a relationship. Taro Kabakura, Koyanagi's long-time boyfriend and Hirotaka's good friend, steps in with Koyanagi to help, but they end up fighting with each other instead. As Narumi attempts to run away, Hirotaka apologizes for frightening her, promising that he is romantically interested in her and not just dating another nerd for convenience. After work, the four visit a bookstore and depart for their own homes to read manga and play games instead of drinking.
3	"Sales Event and Gamers Meetup"; Transliteration: "Sokubai-kai to Gēmu-kai" (Japanese: 即売会とゲーム会)	Gō Tobita	Tomoko Shinozuka	April 27, 2018
Narumi, Hirotaka, Koyanagi and Kabakura attend a comics expo. There, Hirotaka helps Narumi take care of her yaoi doujinshi stand, while Kabakura watches Koyanagi cosplay as multiple male characters. Work resumes as normal for the four after the expo. When Narumi goes to Hirotaka's place to play video games with him, she is initially nervous about being alone with him, but Koyanagi and Kabakura join them soon after. As Hirotaka takes a shower, Koyanagi and Narumi mischievously search for his hidden porn stash, but Narumi finds a pack of old card games they used to trade and play together in middle school instead. The two reminisce how they sparked a friendship after exchanging character pens, and Hirotaka kisses Narumi. The next day, Kabakura shockingly finds a mysterious porn stash hidden in his desk drawer.
4	"Is Mature Love as Difficult?"; Transliteration: "Otona no Koi mo Muzukashī?" (Japanese: オトナの恋も難しい？)	Satoshi Saga	Seiko Takagi	May 4, 2018
Hirotaka and Narumi indulge in their childhood anime together during a work break. When Narumi shows Hirotaka, cross-dressing to Kabakura and Koyanagi, Koyanagi is inspired to make Kabakura cosplay as well, culminating in an argument. Narumi notes that, despite their different interests, she and Hirotaka compromise fairly. Kabakura eventually cosplays for Koyanagi, in exchange for a high quality Yuudachi Kai-II figurine. The four coworkers go drinking. Narumi asks how Koyanagi and Kabakura's relationship began in high school, leading to arguments that cause the drunk Koyanagi to break down. She confesses insecurities about not being Kabakura's "real type" and worries he is settling for her because nerds find stable relationships with non-nerds difficult. Kabakura comforts her. On the way home, Narumi asks Hirotaka the same question, and he reassures her that he is properly invested in their relationship. The two head to the arcade before going home.
5	"Introducing Naoya and Gamers Meetup (Part II)"; Transliteration: "Naoya tōjō to Gēmu-kai Part II" (Japanese: 尚哉登場とゲーム会Part II)	Jin Iwatsuki	Tomoko Shinozuka	May 11, 2018
Narumi bumps into a barista she seems familiar with. Koyanagi and Kabakura mistakenly believe he could be Narumi's ex-boyfriend, and debate calling Hirotaka. When Hirotaka enters, Kabakura hastily calls him to prevent a scene, causing both him and the barista to respond. The barista is Nifuji Naoya, Hirotaka's younger brother. Hirotaka reluctantly agrees to let Naoya stay at his house due to its proximity to the latter's college. As the four coworkers hang out, they realize Naoya is a non-nerd and decide to be careful around him. Narumi proposes a team game and groups the brothers together, though Hirotaka is unwilling because Naoya's inexperience diminishes the fun. Naoya self-destructs, and Hirotaka wins alone, falling asleep on the couch. As Naoya walks Narumi home, Kabakura informs him that Narumi and Hirotaka are dating, and Koyanagi kisses Kabakura to show they are another couple. Naoya tears up out of happiness because he had worried his brother would end up alone, and Kabakura is touched by his sincerity. The next day at work, he advises Hirotaka to take care of him.
6	"Bleak Christmas"; Transliteration: "Yūutsuna Kurisumasu" (Japanese: 憂鬱なクリスマス)	Kazuomi Koga	Seiko Takagi	May 18, 2018
On a rainy day, Kabakura lends Narumi and Hirotaka his umbrella after realizing they both forgot theirs. As she dashes in the rain, she ducks under Koyanagi's umbrella, and she worries about him falling sick as they head to his home for dinner. The next day, Hirotaka notices Narumi is down, though she tries to brush it off. After comforting and pressuring her, Narumi explains that her favorite manga character died recently in a chapter. Hirotaka and Narumi walk home together as the city puts up Christmas decorations. They find Naoya giving out coffee samples in a Santa Claus suit outside the café, who feels grateful for making those around him smile and being their "real Santa Claus". On Christmas Eve, Koyanagi, annoyed because Kabakura was too busy with work to care about romantic things last Christmas, leaves the office first, but Kabakura rushes after her. They end up on a date at a fancy restaurant Kabakura reserved half a year in advance to make up for last year, and Koyanagi gifts him a limited-edition anime plushie. Meanwhile, Hirotaka and Narumi spend their first Christmas together playing games.
7	"Online Gaming and Their Respective Nights"; Transliteration: "Netoge to, Sorezore no Yoru" (Japanese: ネトゲと、それぞれの夜)	Daisuke Takashima	Seiko Takagi	May 25, 2018
The four play an online adventure game together. Narumi, Koyanagi, and Kabakura stumble upon a rare enemy, but are too weak to defeat it. Hirotaka's avatar arrives, though it is controlled by Naoya, while Hirotaka is busy. Hirotaka quickly returns and defeats it easily. Kabakura goes drinking with his male juniors, including Hirotaka, while the women have dinner together. Two male coworkers discuss Narumi, unaware Hirotaka is her boyfriend, then discuss Koyanagi, angering Kabakura, though he hides it. Narumi and Koyanagi disagree again about their opposite pairing preferences in anime, and discuss pairing their boyfriends in a boys' love scenario. Later, Naoya tells Hirotaka he overheard the girls and mistakenly believed they were arguing over whose boyfriend was better.
8	"Weakness is Thunder and Years of Insecurity"; Transliteration: "Nigatena Kaminari to, Ki ni naru Otoshigoro" (Japanese: 苦手な雷と、気になるお年頃)	Matsuo Asami	Tomoko Shinozuka	June 1, 2018
It is a windy workday, and Hirotaka confesses he is afraid of thunder, as it brings back bad memories of unsaved games when the power went out from lightning. To prevent it from disrupting his productivity, Kabakura allows him to wear his headphones, just for today. As Hirotaka goes for a smoke, followed closely by Narumi, he reminisces how she came to visit him once when he was sick, and ended up barging into his house and hugging him due to the loud thunder outside. The two return to work as the sky grows lighter with the passing storm. Hirotaka recalls how he pierced his own ears in high school to seem grown-up, after seeing Narumi with a boy with piercings. When he was unable to pull the earring out, it had begun to hurt, and he had cried. After drinks with everyone, Hirotaka thinks back to how Narumi does not seem to see him as a boyfriend, and worries over how he is so different from a "regular boyfriend", especially in his date choices and attitude. When the two walk home together, Hirotaka decides to ask her out on a conventional date next Sunday.
9	"Go Out on a Date with Me!"; Transliteration: "Dēto e Ikō yo!" (Japanese: デートへ行こうよ！)	Jin Iwatsuki	Yoshimasa Hiraike	June 8, 2018
Hirotaka and Narumi go on a date at an amusement park with a penalty: anyone who says anything nerd-related pays 500 yen to the other. On a horror ride, Narumi's fear causes her to pair up with Kabakura, while Hirotaka goes with Koyanagi, who are also on a date there, coincidentally. Koyanagi assures Hirotaka it is okay to move at their own pace, after he reveals he worries whether Narumi really likes spending time with him. At the end of the day, he thinks back to how Narumi dragged him around as children, and how she has grown up and made many memories, while he remains cooped up in his own world playing games. The two lift the penalty and feel more relaxed. Narumi gifts him a pair of earrings and asserts her desire to witness the "wanting to become more adult-like" side of him she never saw, and the two hug. However, Hirotaka later realizes one of his earholes has closed up.
10	"Introducing Kou-kun and Online Gaming Revenge"; Transliteration: "Kō-kun Tōjō to Netoge Ribenji" (Japanese: 光くん登場とネトゲリベンジ)	Gō Tobita and Satoshi Saga	Seiko Takagi	June 15, 2018
Naoya meets a customer whose gaming silhouette reminds him of his brother. The next day, he bumps into the same person at his university cafeteria. He realizes Kou Sakuragi is an avid gamer like his brother, but does not realize she is a girl due to her androgynous appearance and voice. Naoya invites Kou to play games and asks Narumi and her friends to help him improve. While battling an advanced quest, a mysterious player saves them before Hirotaka arrives, and Naoya thanks Kou over messages. Hirotaka breaks his glasses, and his myopia hinders his work. His female coworkers become conscious of his handsome face, making Narumi distracted and jealous. Kabakura lets them take an early lunch so Hirotaka can get new glasses. Later, Naoya borrows his brother's computer to play multiplayer with Kou. Despite repeated failures, Kou patiently helps him improve. Hirotaka logs on as Naoya's avatar and helps Kou clear a quest. Naoya, returning after a phone call, apologizes and decides to drop out, but Kou promises to help him and invites him to play together.
11	"Love Is Hard for Otaku"; Transliteration: "Otaku ni Koi wa Muzukashī" (Japanese: ヲタクに恋は難しい)	Daisuke Takashima	Tomoko Shinozuka	June 22, 2018
Koyanagi reminisces about when she and Kabakura fought for the gym as captains of the female and male volleyball teams. Meanwhile, Narumi buys snacks for Hirotaka on the last day of vacation, only to find him passed out on the floor from not eating or sleeping to play games. She decides to cook fried rice for him, while calling Koyanagi, only to accidentally see Hirotaka naked after he showers. At Kabakura's house, he and Koyanagi argue over boys love manga, with Koyanagi confessing she wants to share her happiness with others, although she knows he prefers to enjoy things himself. This leads Kabakura to compromise and agree to skim one, and he surprisingly enjoys it. Narumi orders Hirotaka to go on a date with her, but they detour to her house afterwards to watch a variety show starring her favorite voice actor, with Narumi promising to cook for him again. In a post-credits scene, Narumi asks Naoya about his first love, which he bashfully reveals to be his kindergarten teacher. As the four coworkers leave the café after their break, Naoya comments how Hirotaka managed to date his first love, though the latter quickly shuts him up with a look.
OVA–1	"It Appeared Suddenly=Love"; Transliteration: "Sore wa, Ikinari Otozureta=Koi" (Japanese: それは、いきなりおとづれた = 恋)	Kazuomi Koga	Tomoko Shinozuka	March 29, 2019
Narumi and Hirotaka encounter Koyanagi at a coffee shop, where she mentions attending a 2.5D show about Kabakura's high school volleyball days. They recall how she and Kabakura were rival volleyball captains who fought over gym time, with Kabakura using seniority until Koyanagi blackmailed him with a photo of his otaku merchandise. Later, Kabakura impressed her with his jump shot, agreeing to teach her if she deleted the photo. The listeners debate who confessed first. Kabakura revealed he imagines anime theme songs during shots, which Koyanagi admired. After his team lost their final game, a heartbroken Koyanagi consoled him. Following graduation, they met via a letter she wrote, exchanged quips, then turned back to embrace. Kabakura later scolds Koyanagi for revealing the story, and they argue over who hugged first. Narumi and Hirotaka notice Koyanagi never deleted the photo, and Narumi understands why.
OVA–2	"Friend's Distance"; Transliteration: "Tomodachi no Kyori" (Japanese: トモダチの距離)	Yayoi Takano	Teruko Utsumi	February 26, 2021
Kou goes to the arcade with Naoya and his friends, feeling self-conscious about not telling him she is a girl. He accidentally spots her leaving the girls' bathroom, realizing the truth, while she runs away, embarrassed. When Kou stops attending school, Naoya seeks advice from Hirotaka and Narumi, and logs into Hirotaka's account to contact her in-game. After mutual apologies and working together to evade an enemy, they reconcile. Later, Naoya runs into Kou again while accompanying Hirotaka and Narumi on an arcade date, and the four hang out, with Hirotaka and Kou bonding over their skill levels. Kou is initially jealous of Narumi, but relieved to learn she is not with Naoya. On another day, Naoya receives movie tickets and, encouraged by his friend, invites Kou, who arrives in more feminine clothes with Narumi's help, surprising him. She recalls Hirotaka thanking her for being close to him. After the date, Kou admits she feels better around Naoya, saying she likes him and wants to stay friends forever; Naoya is caught off guard but happily accepts. As they part, both reflect on their feelings and what they want from their relationship.
OVA–3	"Company Outing"; Transliteration: "Shain Ryokōkai" (Japanese: 社員旅行回)	Unknown	Unknown	October 14, 2021
The office plans a retreat at a hot springs inn, with Koyanagi against it, Narumi for it, and Hirotaka indifferent, until they learn Kabakura is in charge of planning, so all agree to join. Having never been on a trip since school, Hirotaka asks Narumi's help finding essentials to pack. Because of his inexperience, Narumi wants him to grow friendlier with other employees, though Hirotaka secretly desires alone time with her. On the trip, Hirotaka has fun with some coworkers, making Narumi slightly jealous. That night in the bath, the girls and boys each voice their feelings of wanting to be closer, resulting in a drunken Kabakura getting slightly intimate with Koyanagi and Narumi and Hirotaka spending time together outside under the guise of her playing a gacha game. Later, the four, plus Naoya and Kou, meet for a gaming party, where Narumi asks Hirotaka if he would like to go on a trip she plans next time. Back at work, Narumi and Koyanagi fantasize over how their relationships would be if all were gender-swapped.

=== Film ===
On July 26, 2018, a video promoting the sixth volume of the manga also revealed that a live-action film adaptation was in production.

On September 18, 2018, the cast for the film was revealed, starring Mitsuki Takahata and Kento Yamazaki as double leads Narumi and Hirotaka. It was distributed by Toho and released in Japanese theaters on February 7, 2020. The film ranked first in Japan on its opening weekend, with more than 389,000 tickets sold over the weekend.

== Reception ==
The manga's compiled book volumes have frequently ranked on Oricon. Volume 2 was ranked first, and sold up to 208,765 copies in its first week. Volume 3 was ranked fourth, and sold up to 209,102 copies in its first week. Volume 4 was ranked first, and sold up to 283,523 copies in its first week. The manga had up to 4.2 million copies in print by July 2017. By August 2020, the manga had over 10 million copies in circulation.

In 2015, the series won the first Next Manga Award in the web Manga category. The manga was ranked first in the 2016 edition of Kono Manga ga Sugoi! (lit. 'This Manga Is Amazing!') guidebook. The manga was ranked ninth in the Zenkoku Shotenin ga Eranda Osusume Comic 2017 (Nationwide Bookstore Employees' Recommended Comics of 2017) poll on February 1, 2017. It was nominated for the 41st Kodansha Manga Award in the Best General Manga category. In September 2017, it won the Web Manga General Election.

Shirō Sagisu, the music composer for the 2020 live-action film adaptation, was awarded the Sandro Forte Award For Best Motion Picture Score by Montreal's 24th Fantasia International Film Festival.
