= Good Doctor (South Korean TV series) =

2013 South Korean medical drama television series

- Promotional poster
- Hangul: 굿 닥터
- RR: Gut dakteo
- MR: Kut takt'ŏ
- Genre: Medical drama Romantic comedy
- Created by: Park Jae-beom
- Directed by: Ki Min-soo; Kim Jin-woo
- Starring: Joo Won; Moon Chae-won; Joo Sang-wook; Kim Min-seo
- Composer: Choi Cheol-ho
- Country of origin: South Korea
- Original language: Korean
- No. of episodes: 20

Production
- Executive producers: Kim Sung-geun; Lee Jang-soo; Yoo Hong-gu
- Producers: Lee Jae-hoon; Park Woo-ram
- Cinematography: Kim Jae-hwan; Kim Yong-soo
- Editor: Kim Mi-kyung
- Production company: Logos Film

Original release
- Network: KBS2
- Release: August 5 – October 8, 2013

Related
- The Good Doctor (US); Good Doctor (Japan); Mucize Doktor (Turkey); Good Doctor หมอใจพิเศษ (Thailand)

Good Doctor (Korean: 굿 닥터) is a 2013 South Korean medical drama television series starring Joo Won, Moon Chae-won, Joo Sang-wook, Kim Min-seo, Chun Ho-jin, Kwak Do-won, and Ko Chang-seok. It aired on KBS2 from August 5 to October 8, 2013, on Mondays and Tuesdays at 21:55 for 20 episodes. The early working title was Green Scalpel (Korean: 그린 메스; RR: Geurin meseu; lit. 'Green Mes' (Note: "Mes" is derived from the Dutch word for knife, and is commonly used in Korea/Japan to refer to a scalpel.)).

== Synopsis ==
Park Si-on (Joo Won) is a resident surgeon on the autism spectrum with savant syndrome who was sent to a specialized care center as a child, where he was discovered to have a genius-level memory and keen spatial skills. He eventually becomes a pediatric surgery resident and is given six months to prove himself capable. However, due to his atypical mental and emotional condition, Si-on faces conflict from his peers and patients, who view him as childlike and unreliable. Most critical is the hotheaded surgeon Kim Do-han (Joo Sang-wook). Do-han was requested by the young surgeon's mentor and hospital director, Choi Woo-seok (Chun Ho-jin), to guide him but is unwilling to do so, as he criticizes him as overly dependent on his photographic memory rather than empathy for patients. Despite help from understanding and fair colleagues like Cha Yoon-seo (Moon Chae-won) and Han Jin-wook (Kim Young-kwang), the hospital is a fierce and competitive world, and the challenges Si-on faces become only greater when he falls in love with Yoon-seo, a fellow doctor at the hospital.

== Cast ==
=== Main ===
- Joo Won as Park Si-on
  - Choi Ro-woon as young Si-on
- Moon Chae-won as Cha Yoon-seo
- Joo Sang-wook as Kim Do-han
- Kim Min-seo as Yoo Chae-kyung

=== Supporting ===
==== Sungwon University Hospital officials ====
- Chun Ho-jin as Choi Woo-seok, director
- Kwak Do-won as Kang Hyun-tae, deputy director
- Na Young-hee as Lee Yeo-won, chairwoman of the board
- Jo Hee-bong as Go Choong-man, head of the Pediatric Surgery department
- Lee Ki-yeol as Lee Hyuk-pil, managing director of the foundation
- Jung Man-sik as Kim Jae-joon, head of the Hepatobiliary-Pancreatic Surgery department

==== Department of Pediatric Surgery ====
- Kim Young-kwang as Han Jin-wook

A warm and friendly fourth-year resident, who first approaches Park Shi-on when he is shunned by the others.

- Yoon Park as Woo Il-kyu, second-year resident
- Yoon Bong-gil as Hong Gil-nam, second-year resident
- Wang Ji-won as Kim Sun-joo, intern

==== Nursing division ====
- Ko Chang-seok as Jo Jung-mi, senior nurse
- Jin Kyung as Nam Joo-yeon, head nurse
- Lee Ah-rin as Ga-kyung
- Ha Kyu-won as Hye-jin

==== Children's ward ====
- Kim Hyun-soo as Na In-hae
- Uhm Hyun-kyung as Na In-young
- Ahn Sung-hoon as Lee Woo-ram
- Yoo Je-gun as Park Ho-suk
- Lee Jang-kyung as Kim Ye-eun
- Oh Eun-chan as Cha Dong-jin
- Yoo Hae-jung as Eun-ok
- Jung Yoon-seok as Kyu-hyun

==== Others ====
- Yoon Yoo-sun as Oh Kyung-joo, Shi-on's mother
- Jung Ho-keun as Park Choon-sung, Shi-on's father
- Seo Hyun-chul as Byung-soo
- Jeon Jun-hyeok as Park Si-deok, Shi-on's older brother
  - Ryu Deok-hwan as adult Si-deok (cameo, ep 10)
- Ban Min-jung as Kyu-hyun's mother
- Kim Chang-wan as Chairman Jung

=== Special appearances ===
- Kwak Ji-min as Lee Soo-jin (guest appearance, ep 10–12)
- Moon Hee-kyung as Mrs. Jang, Soo-jin's mother-in-law
- Kim Sun-hwa as Eun-ok's aunt
- Seo Kang-joon as one of the punks who want to beat up Shi-on (ep 12)
- In Gyo-jin as Soo-jin's husband (cameo, ep 12)
- Yoo Jae-myung as the killer (ep 15)
- Kim Young-hee as staff of the family restaurant (ep 17)
- Gong Jung-hwan as Professor of Neurosurgery Department (ep 17)
- Park Ki-woong as Woong-ki (cameo, ep 20)

== Ratings ==
Good Doctor made a strong debut on the TV ratings chart. It maintained the number one spot in its timeslot for most of its run, with an average viewership rating of 18.0% (AGB Nielsen) and 17.4% (TNmS).

Ep.	Original broadcast date	Average audience share			
Ep.	Original broadcast date	Nielsen Korea		TNmS Ratings	
Ep.	Original broadcast date	Nationwide	Seoul	Nationwide	Seoul
1	August 5, 2013	10.9%	11.6%	10.5%	10.3%
2	August 6, 2013	14.0%	15.1%	13.6%	14.6%
3	August 12, 2013	15.3%	16.2%	13.8%	14.6%
4	August 13, 2013	15.8%	15.8%	15.9%	16.9%
5	August 19, 2013	18.0%	18.5%	16.5%	17.6%
6	August 20, 2013	19.0%	20.0%	18.4%	20.4%
7	August 26, 2013	17.4%	18.2%	17.2%	18.1%
8	August 27, 2013	18.4%	18.5%	17.5%	19.0%
9	September 2, 2013	17.4%	17.4%	17.0%	18.3%
10	September 3, 2013	18.4%	18.3%	18.5%	20.5%
11	September 9, 2013	18.3%	18.7%	18.3%	20.2%
12	September 10, 2013	19.4%	19.4%	20.0%	22.2%
13	September 16, 2013	17.9%	18.4%	17.5%	19.3%
14	September 17, 2013	18.6%	19.3%	18.9%	20.3%
15	September 23, 2013	19.6%	20.3%	18.5%	20.2%
16	September 24, 2013	21.5%	22.8%	20.9%	22.7%
17	September 30, 2013	20.3%	21.1%	18.0%	20.5%
18	October 1, 2013	20.6%	21.5%	19.0%	21.4%
19	October 7, 2013	19.0%	20.0%	17.6%	20.1%
20	October 8, 2013	19.2%	19.5%	19.5%	22.4%
Average		18.0%	18.5%	17.4%	18.9%

== Awards and nominations ==
Year	Award	Category	Recipient	Result
2013	26th Grimae Awards	Best Drama	Good Doctor	Won
2013	Korea Drama Awards	Best Drama	Good Doctor	Nominated
2013	Korea Drama Awards	Top Excellence Award, Actor	Joo Won	Nominated
2013	Korea Drama Awards	Top Excellence Award, Actor	Joo Sang-wook	Nominated
2013	Korea Drama Awards	Top Excellence Award, Actress	Moon Chae-won	Nominated
2013	Korea Drama Awards	Best Writer	Park Jae-bum	Won
2013	APAN Star Awards	Top Excellence Award, Actor	Joo Won	Nominated
2013	APAN Star Awards	Excellence Award, Actor	Joo Sang-wook	Nominated
2013	APAN Star Awards	Excellence Award, Actress	Moon Chae-won	Nominated
2013	KBS Drama Awards	Top Excellence Award, Actor	Joo Won	Won
2013	KBS Drama Awards	Actor of the Year (selected by directors)	Joo Won	Won
2013	KBS Drama Awards	Top Excellence Award, Actress	Moon Chae-won	Nominated
2013	KBS Drama Awards	Excellence Award, Actor in a Mid-length Drama	Joo Sang-wook	Won
2013	KBS Drama Awards	Excellence Award, Actor in a Mid-length Drama	Joo Won	Nominated
2013	KBS Drama Awards	Excellence Award, Actress in a Mid-length Drama	Moon Chae-won	Won
2013	KBS Drama Awards	Best Supporting Actor	Jo Hee-bong	Nominated
2013	KBS Drama Awards	Best Supporting Actor	Ko Chang-seok	Nominated
2013	KBS Drama Awards	Best Supporting Actress	Jin Kyung	Nominated
2013	KBS Drama Awards	Best Supporting Actress	Kim Min-seo	Nominated
2013	KBS Drama Awards	Best New Actor	Kim Young-kwang	Nominated
2013	KBS Drama Awards	Best Young Actor	Jung Yun-seok	Nominated
2013	KBS Drama Awards	Best Young Actress	Kim Hyun-soo	Nominated
2013	KBS Drama Awards	Best Couple Award	Joo Won and Moon Chae-won	Won
2013	KBS Drama Awards	Netizen Award, Actor	Joo Won	Won
2013	KBS Drama Awards	Popularity Award, Actress	Moon Chae-won	Won
2014	Korea Producers & Directors' Awards	Best Drama	Good Doctor	Won
2014	Korea Producers & Directors' Awards	Best Performer	Joo Won	Won
2014	Baeksang Arts Awards	Best Drama	Good Doctor	Won
2014	Baeksang Arts Awards	Best Director	Ki Min-soo	Nominated
2014	Baeksang Arts Awards	Best Actor	Joo Won	Nominated
2014	Banff World Media Festival	Best Serial Drama	Good Doctor	Won
2014	Korea Broadcasting Awards	Best Drama	Good Doctor	Won
2014	Seoul International Drama Awards	Best Mini-series	Good Doctor	Runner-up

In November 2013, the Korea Association of the Welfare Institutes for the Disabled gave the series a plaque of recognition for creating awareness about autism and how socially challenged individuals can contribute to society. In December 2013, Good Doctor also received an award from the Disability Awareness Campaign Headquarters and was designated as a "Good Program" by the Korea Communications Standards Commission.

== International adaptations ==
=== American ===
An American remake of the same name, produced by Daniel Dae Kim, premiered in late September 2017 on ABC. The story of a surgeon with autism is set in San Jose, California, airing during fall of 2017.

=== Japanese ===
A Japanese remake of the same name starred Kento Yamazaki, Juri Ueno, and Naohito Fujiki aired from July 12 to September 13, 2018, on Fuji TV.

=== Turkish ===
A Turkish remake called Mucize Doktor produced by Asena Bülbüloğlu debuted on September 12, 2019, on Fox Turkey.

=== Thailand ===
A Thailand remake of the same name, produced by True4U, TrueVisions, and True CJ Creations, debuted in October 2024 on the True ID application, and True Asian More channel 120/239 for TrueVisions subscribers. This version Sarun Naraprasertkul and Chayanit Chansangavej take the lead roles as Dr. Shone and Dr. Preem.

=== Philippines ===
A Philippine remake of the same name, produced by CreaZion Studios and MediaQuest, will premiere in 2026 on TV5, ALLTV2 (through its ABS-CBN licensing), Kapamilya Channel and A2Z.
