= Good Doctor (Japanese TV series) =

- グッド ドクター
- Genre: Medical drama
- Based on: Good Doctor by Park Jae-bum
- Developed by: Fuji TV
- Written by: Yuichi Tokunaga; Haruka Okita
- Directed by: Hiro Kanai; Hideyuki Aizawa
- Starring: Kento Yamazaki; Juri Ueno; Naohito Fujiki
- Ending theme: Hikari by Androp
- Composer: Masahiro Tokuda
- Country of origin: Japan
- Original language: Japanese
- No. of episodes: 10

Production
- Producers: Fujino Ryota; Kinjo Ayaka
- Production location: Japan
- Production company: Fuji TV Drama Production Center

Original release
- Network: Fuji TV
- Release: July 12 – September 13, 2018

Related
- Good Doctor; The Good Doctor

Good Doctor (グッドドクター; Guddo Dokuta) is a Japanese medical drama remake of the 2013 South Korean television series of the same name, about a person on the autism spectrum who becomes a pediatric surgeon. It aired on Thursdays at 22:00 (JST) from July 12 to September 13, 2018 on Fuji TV, and starred Kento Yamazaki, Juri Ueno, and Naohito Fujiki.

== Plot ==
Minato Shindo (Kento Yamazaki) is autistic with savant syndrome. He has an amazing memory and keen spatial skills, but he finds it difficult to communicate with others. Minato aspires to become a doctor because his older brother died when they were young. He later meets doctor Akira Shiga (Akira Emoto) and amazes him with his ability to remember all the human organs at a young age. Doctor Akira decides to support Minato and with his recommendation, Minato eventually enters the world of pediatric surgery as a resident.

== Cast ==
=== Main ===
- Kento Yamazaki as Minato Shindo
  - Junta Ito as young Minato
- Juri Ueno as Natsumi Seto
- Naohito Fujiki as Seiji Takayama

=== Supporting ===
- Akira Emoto as Akira Shiga
- Yuri Nakamura as Michi Togo
- Kenta Hamano as Taro Hashiguchi
- Itsuji Itao as Ryunosuke Inoguchi
- Shigeyuki Totsugi as Keisuke Mamiya
- Kodai Asaka as Nakajima
- Daigo Matsui as Marui
- Ryosuke Ikeoka as Nonomura
- Risaki Matsukaze as Iyo Morishita
- Airi Matsui as Shiori Morishita
- Yua Kawashima as Nao Aisawa
- Taiyo Saito as Rintaro Takechi
- Reju Kojima as Keita Tomioka

=== Guest appearance ===
- Rento Oyama as Kota (ep.1)
- Nishihara Aki as Kota's mother (ep.1)
- Kiara Minegishi as Masaki (ep.1)
- Anna Yamada as Yuina Sugawara (ep.2)
- Asuka Kurosawa as Sugawara Maki (ep.2)
- Kotone Nakajima as Mai Ishiyama (ep.3)
- Saki Takenoya as Miyu Ichikawa (ep.3)
- Aki Maeda as Shiori Ichikawa (ep.3)
- Saki Takamatsu as Akari Oishi (ep.4)
- Jun Murakami as Oishi san (ep.4)
- Elen as Kaoru Oishi (ep.4)
- Kairi Jo as Hibiki Hayama (ep.5)
- Masaki Miura as Hibiki's father (ep.5)
- Keiko Horiuchi (ep.6)
- Yukiko Shinohara as Rika Mizuno (ep.6)
- Mayuko Fukuda as Nanako (ep.7)
- Kisetsu Fujiwara as Kentaro (ep.7)
- Souma Torigoe as Haruto Hayami (ep.8)
- Yuto Ikeda as Shota Hayami (ep.8)
- Riku Hagiwara as Ryohei Takigawa (ep.7-9)
- Koen Kondo (ep.10)
- Eri Murakawa (ep.10)
- Rin Furukawa as Misaki (ep.10)
- Kaito Yoshimura as Masaya Takayama (Seiji Takayama's brother)
- Kanau Tanaka as Sota Shindo (Minato Shindo's older brother)

== Production ==
=== Development ===
On May 26, Fuji TV first announced that they would make an adaptation of Good Doctor with Kento Yamazaki as the lead actor. Several days later, other supporting cast members were announced.

A special screening of the first episode was held on July 8, 2018, with three of the main leads in attendance.

=== Filming ===
Filming began around June 17, 2018.

== Ratings ==
Good Doctor received good ratings, with its first airing at 11.5%, the highest rating for its time slot in the last 2 years.

Episode	Broadcast Date	Ratings(%) (Kanto Region)	Ref.
01	July 12, 2018	11.5%	
02	July 19, 2018	10.6%	
03	July 26, 2018	11.6%	
04	August 2, 2018	10.6%	
05	August 9, 2018	12.2%	
06	August 16, 2018	10.8%	
07	August 23, 2018	13.0%	
08	August 30, 2018	9.4%	
09	September 6, 2018	10.2%	
10	September 13, 2018	12.4%	
Average		11.2%	

== International broadcast ==
Starting on July 21, 2018, the drama aired on WakuWaku Japan in Indonesia, Myanmar, Singapore, Thailand, Taiwan, Sri Lanka, Mongolia, and Vietnam, on Saturdays at 21:00 (SGP), 20:00 (JKT).
