= Elan d'or Award for Newcomer of the Year =

Japanese cinema award

- Awarded for: Newcomer of the Year
- Country: Japan
- Presented by: All Nippon Producers Association
- First award: 1956
- Website: www.producer.or.jp/elandor.html

The Elan d'or Award for Newcomer of the Year is an award given at the Elan d'or Awards in Japan. This award is given to the person who is considered to be the most promising actor through the year.

No.	Year	Actor(s)	Note
New Actors Award
1	1956	Junko Ikeuchi; Yujiro Ishihara; Hiroshi Kawaguchi; Kōjirō Kusanagi; Yumi Shirakawa; Hiroko Sugita; Ken Takakura	
2	1957	Reiko Dan; Shinjirō Ehara; Noriko Kitazawa; Tatsuya Nakadai; Miki Mori; Hisako Tsukuba; Keizō Kawasaki	
3	1958	Ruriko Asaoka; Junko Kanō; Miyuki Kuwano; Mayumi Ōzora; Ryōko Sakuma; Makoto Satō; Kakuko Chino	
4	1959	Kōjirō Hongō; Teruo Hoshi; Joh Mizuki; Ichirō Nakatani; Yōsuke Natsuki; Mayumi Shimizu; Toyozō Yamamoto	
5	1960	Keiichirō Akagi; Jun Fujimaki; Yuriko Hoshi; Tomoko Kawaguchi; Hiroki Matsukata; Shinichirō Mikami; Teruo Yoshida	
6	1961	Shima Iwashita; Yūzō Kayama; Yoshiko Mita; Jirō Tamiya; Tsutomu Yamazaki; Sayuri Yoshinaga	
7	1962	Chieko Baisho; Mie Hama; Mitsuo Hamada; Michiko Sugata; Sonny Chiba; Kei Yamamoto	
8	1963	Masako Izumi; Mariko Kaga; Kin'ya Kitaōji; Yuki Nakagawa; Mie Nakao; Miwa Takada; Kōji Takahashi	
9	1964	Shiho Fujimura; Chiyoko Honma; Ichikawa Somegorō VI; Go Kato; Yoshiko Kayama; Chieko Matsubara; Jitsuko Yoshimura	
10	1965	Kyōko Enami; Sumiko Fuji; Yōko Naitō; Mayumi Ogawa; Muga Takewaki; Tetsuya Watari	
11	1966	Asahi Kurizuka; Toshio Kurosawa; Reiko Ohara; Takashi Yamaguchi; Yōko Yamamoto; Michiyo Okusu	
12	1967	Eiko Azusa; Komaki Kurihara; Jin Nakayama; Tomoko Ogawa; Wakako Sakai; Ryōtarō Sugi	
Elan d'or Award for Newcomer of the Year by Japan Film Producers Association
1	1968	Etsuko Ikuta; Ryūnosuke Minegishi; Mari Nakayama; Mitsuko Oka; Etsushi Takahashi; Hayato Tani	
2	1969	Mari Atsumi; Masaya Oki; Nana Ozaki; Kiwako Taichi; Noriko Takahashi; Masumi Tachibana	
3	1970	Daijirō Harada; Kensaku Morita; Junko Natsu; Yūsuke Okada; Nobuto Okamoto; Masaaki Sakai; Orie Satō; Eiko Takehara; Tomoko Umeda; Tsunehiko Watase; Eiko Yanami	
	1971	N/A	
4	1972	Reiko Ike; Masaomi Kondō; Rumi Sakakibara; Keiko Takahashi; Shirō Mifune; Karin Yamaguchi; Kyōko Yoshizawa	
5	1973	Masayo Utsunomiya; Miki Sugimoto; Taro Shigaki; Keiko Matsuzaka; Takenori Murano; Sen Yamamoto; Mari Tanaka; Hiroshi Fujioka; Michiko Honda; Hiroko Maki	
6	1974	Miyoko Asada; Hitomi Kozue; Yoko Shimada; Setsuko Sekine; Akiko Nishina; Kenichi Hagiwara; Tomokazu Miura; Kaori Momoi; Masaaki Daimon; Yōko Takahashi; Yutaka Nakajima	
7	1975	Kumiko Akiyoshi; Masao Kusakari; Kimiko Ikegami; Fumi Dan; Etsuko Shihomi; Masatoshi Nakamura; Midori Hagio	
8	1976	Terumi Azuma; Nana Okada; Shinobu Otake; Ken Tanaka; Nagisa Katahira; Jinpachi Nezu; Kyōko Mitsubayashi; Hiroshi Katsuno; Ai Saotome; Yumi Takigawa	
Elan d'or Award for Newcomer of the Year by All Nippon Producers Association
1	1977	Yōko Asaji; Koichi Iwaki; Jun Etō; Mieko Harada; Kyōko Maya	
2	1978	Harumi Arai; Yūko Asano; Junichi Inoue; Kentaro Shimizu; Yōko Natsuki; Keiko Takeshita; Tetsuya Takeda; Eiko Nagashima	
3	1979	Tomiyuki Kunihiro; Toshiyuki Nagashima; Mariko Fuji; Aiko Morishita; Chikako Yuri	
4	1980	Mami Kumagai; Yūko Kotegawa; Kyōhei Shibata; Ken Matsudaira; Jun Miyauchi	
5	1981	Kenichi Kaneda; Ai Kanzaki; Kayoko Kishimoto; Sakae Takita; Kanako Higuchi	
6	1982	Takeshi Kaga; Hiroyuki Sanada; Yūko Tanaka; Masako Natsume; Masato Furuoya	
7	1983	Morio Kazama; Misako Konno; Kiichi Nakai; Yūko Natori; Daisuke Ryu	
8	1984	Kōichi Satō; Saburō Tokitō; Kie Nakai; Tomoyo Harada; Kōji Yakusho	
9	1985	Mariko Ishihara; Takaaki Enoki; Yūko Kazu; Tōru Watanabe; Miwako Fujitani	
10	1986	Momoko Kikuchi; Kōji Kikkawa; Yasuko Sawaguchi; Shingo Yanagisawa	
11	1987	Yuki Saito; Takanori Jinnai; Miho Nakayama; Narumi Yasuda; Ken Watanabe	
12	1988	Sayuri Kokushō; Yasuko Tomita; Kumiko Goto; Yoko Minamino; Tōru Nakamura	
13	1989	Yumi Asō; Naoto Ogata; Masahiro Takashima; Hiroshi Mikami; Mayumi Wakamura	
14	1990	Miyuki Imori; Honami Suzuki; Kaho Minami; Masahiro Motoki; Toshirō Yanagiba	
15	1991	Youki Kudoh; Masanobu Takashima; Tomoko Nakajima; Hironobu Nomura; Riho Makise	
16	1992	Hikari Ishida; Nobuko Sendō; Emi Wakui; Masatoshi Nagase; Hidetaka Yoshioka; Minoru Tanaka	
17	1993	Masaya Kato; Misa Shimizu; Hidekazu Akai; Nae Yūki; Toshiaki Karasawa	
18	1994	Sachiko Sakurai; Isako Washio; Yuki Sumida; Michitaka Tsutsui; Masato Hagiwara; Takehiro Murata	
19	1995	Tomoko Yamaguchi; Anju Suzuki; Michiko Hada; Gorō Kishitani; Etsushi Toyokawa; Takuya Kimura	
20	1996	Takako Tokiwa; Mayu Tsuruta; Sae Isshiki; Toshiya Nagasawa; Katsunori Takahashi; Kippei Shiina	
21	1997	Takako Matsu; Naoko Iijima; Asaka Seto; Takaya Kamikawa; Masahiko Nishimura	
22	1998	Miho Kanno; Yoshino Kimura; Misato Tanaka; Tadanobu Asano; Masaaki Uchino	
23	1999	Nanako Matsushima; Takashi Kashiwabara; Ken Kaneko; Miki Sakai; Kyoko Fukada	
24	2000	Miki Nakatani; Hiroyuki Ikeuchi; Masanori Ishii; Haruhiko Katō; Shunsuke Nakamura	
25	2001	Hideaki Itō; Yōsuke Kubozuka; Mitsuhiro Oikawa; Chizuru Ikewaki; Ai Kato; Akiko Yada	
26	2002	Ryoko Kuninaka; Kenji Sakaguchi; Yūko Takeuchi; Satoshi Tsumabuki; Naohito Fujiki; Ryoko Yonekura	
27	2003	Yukiyoshi Ozawa; Rei Kikukawa; Kō Shibasaki; Yukie Nakama; Tatsuya Fujiwara	
28	2004	Aya Ueto; Joe Odagiri; Koyuki; Shinobu Terajima; Nakamura Shidō II; Takayuki Yamada	
29	2005	Satomi Ishihara; Misaki Ito; Masami Nagasawa; Hiroki Narimiya; Koji Yamamoto	
30	2006	Atsushi Itō; Rina Uchiyama; Erika Sawajiri; Mokomichi Hayami; Maki Horikita	
31	2007	Yū Aoi; Haruka Ayase; Juri Ueno; Hitori Gekidan; Hiroshi Tamaki; Kenichi Matsuyama	
32	2008	Yui Aragaki; Shun Oguri; Shihori Kanjiya; Rei Dan; Nao Ōmori	
33	2009	Eita; Meisa Kuroki; Erika Toda; Shota Matsuda; Haruma Miura; Aoi Miyazaki	
34	2010	Nana Eikura; Masaki Okada; Mirai Shida; Mikako Tabe; Ryuhei Matsuda; Hiro Mizushima	
35	2011	Michiko Kichise; Kenta Kiritani; Takeru Satoh; Nao Matsushita; Hikari Mitsushima; Osamu Mukai	
36	2012	Kengo Kora; Mao Inoue; Anne Watanabe; Hiroki Hasegawa; Yuriko Yoshitaka	
37	2013	Shōta Sometani; Machiko Ono; Tori Matsuzaka; Emi Takei; Mirai Moriyama; Yōko Maki	
38	2014	Gō Ayano; Fumino Kimura; Masahiro Higashide; Rena Nōnen; Sota Fukushi; Ai Hashimoto	
39	2015	Sosuke Ikematsu; Keiko Kitagawa; Takumi Saito; Haru Kuroki; Ryōhei Suzuki; Fumi Nikaidō	
40	2016	Tasuku Emoto; Kasumi Arimura; Masaki Suda; Tao Tsuchiya; Tetsuji Tamayama; Yō Yoshida	
41	2017	Kentaro Sakaguchi; Mitsuki Takahata; Dean Fujioka; Haru; Gen Hoshino; Suzu Hirose	
42	2018	Issey Takahashi; Mugi Kadowaki; Ryoma Takeuchi; Hana Sugisaki; Tsuyoshi Muro; Riho Yoshioka	
43	2019	Jun Shison; Wakana Aoi; Kei Tanaka; Mei Nagano; Tomoya Nakamura; Mayu Matsuoka	
44	2020	Ryusei Yokohama; Ryūnosuke Kamiki; Sakura Ando; Kaya Kiyohara; Ryo Yoshizawa; Kanna Hashimoto	
45	2021	Kento Kaku; Masataka Kubota; Ryo Narita; Sairi Ito; Takumi Kitamura; Mone Kamishiraishi; Minami Hamabe; Nana Mori	
46	2022	Noriko Eguchi; Yuya Yagira; Yuki Yamada; Taiga Nakano; Alice Hirose; Haruna Kawaguchi	
47	2023	Kouhei Matsushita; Yukino Kishii; Shotaro Mamiya; Nao; Taishi Nakagawa; Mana Ashida	
48	2024	Hayato Isomura; Ren Meguro; Fuka Koshiba; Mio Imada; Mayu Hotta; Gordon Maeda	
49	2025	Wakana Matsumoto; Ryuya Wakaba; Shuri; Koshi Mizukami; Yuumi Kawai; Fumiya Takahashi	
Elan d'or Award by All Nippon Producers Association
50	2026	Jiro Sato; Kaho; Amane Okayama; Hokuto Matsumura; Kyoko Yoshine; Akari Takaishi	
