= Golden Kamuy: The Hunt of Prisoners in Hokkaido =

2024 Japanese television series

Japanese name
- Kanji: ゴールデンカムイ 北海道刺青囚人争奪編
Transcriptions
- Revised Hepburn: Gōruden Kamui Hokkaidō Irezumi Shuujin Sōdatsuhen
- Genre: Historical; Action drama
- Based on: Golden Kamuy by Satoru Noda
- Written by: Satoru Noda; Tsutomu Kuroiwa
- Directed by: Sigeaki Kubo; Kenji Katagiri; Ken Ochiai; Yosuke Sato
- Starring: Kento Yamazaki; Anna Yamada; Yûma Yamoto; Gordon Maeda; Hiroshi Tamaki; Hiroshi Tachi
- Music by: Yutaka Yamada
- Country of origin: Japan
- Original language: Japanese
- No. of episodes: 9

Production
- Producers: Shinzo Matsuhashi; Ryo Otaki; Haruna Ueda; Ryosuke Mori; Yuya Satoyoshi
- Cinematography: Daisuke Souma
- Editor: Tsuyoshi Wada
- Camera setup: Multi-camera
- Running time: 48–55 min
- Production company: Credeus

Original release
- Network: Wowow; Netflix
- Release: October 6, 2024

Related
- Golden Kamuy (film)

Golden Kamuy: The Hunt of Prisoners in Hokkaido (Japanese: ゴールデンカムイ 北海道刺青囚人争奪編, Hepburn: Gōruden Kamui Hokkaidō Irezumi Shuujin Sōdatsuhen) is a 2024 Japanese TV series directed by Shigeaki Kubo, based on the manga series Golden Kamuy written and illustrated by Satoru Noda, and a direct follow-up to the Golden Kamuy live-action film. The series premiered on Wowow on 6 October 2024 and was released on Netflix on 6 February 2025.

== Cast ==
- Kento Yamazaki as Saichi Sugimoto
- Anna Yamada as Asirpa
- Gordon Maeda as Hyakunosuke Ogata
- Yūma Yamoto as Yoshitake Shiraishi
- Asuka Kudo as Hajime Tsukishima
- Shuntarō Yanagi as Kōhei Nikaidō
- Ryohei Otani as Genjirō Tanigaki
- Debo Akibe as Asirpa's great-uncle
- Hisako Ōkata as Huci
- Katsuya as Tatsuuma Ushiyama
- Katsumi Kiba as Shinpachi Nagakura
- Kazuki Kitamura as Shirosuke Inudo
- Maryjun Takahashi as Inkaramat
- Hiroyuki Ikeuchi as Kiroranke
- Masato Hagiwara as Kazuo Henmi
- Takahiro Fujimoto as Tetsuzō Nihei
- Yuki Furukawa as Yasaku Edogai
- Kiyohiko Shibukawa as Kiichirō Wakayama
- Tomoki Kimura as Tatsuya Nakazawa
- Takashi Ukaji as the great-uncle in Yūfutsu
- Kenjirō Ishimaru as Teruchika Yodogawa
- Yu Tokui as Chōan Kumagishi
- Kazuhiro Yamaji as Kiyohiro Suzukawa
- Taishi Nakagawa as Otonoshin Koito
- Arata Iura as Aca
- Hiroshi Tamaki as Tokushirō Tsurumi
- Hiroshi Tachi as Toshizō Hijikata

== Awards and nominations ==
Award	Category	Recipient(s)	Result	Ref.
18th Tokyo Drama Awards	Best Domestic Series	Golden Kamuy: The Hunt of Prisoners in Hokkaido	Nominated	
