= Halca =

Japanese musician

- Born: July 7
- Origin: Japan
- Genres: Anison
- Occupation: Singer
- Years active: 2018–present
- Label: Sacra Music
- Website: halcaofficial.com

YouTube information
- Channel: Halca Official
- Years active: 2019-present
- Subscribers: 54.6 thousand
- Views: 31.5 million
- Last updated: August 1st, 2026

Halca (Japanese: ハルカ, Hepburn: Haruka; born July 7) is a Japanese musician affiliated with Music Ray'n and signed to Sacra Music. She was the opening act for the Chico with HoneyWorks 2017 tour. In 2018, she released her first single "Kimi no Tonari", the title track of which was used as the closing theme for the anime series Wotakoi: Love Is Hard for Otaku. Her music has been featured in Ace Attorney, Rent-A-Girlfriend, and Kaguya-sama: Love Is War.

== Biography ==
Halca had an interest in music from early childhood. She was inspired when she received a CD copy of the song "Again" by Yui. While in junior high school, she became familiar with anime music when she discovered that her home's cable TV had an anime channel, which she would then watch on a daily basis. Although series such as Cardcaptor Sakura and Toradora! left an impact on her, it was "Kiss Kara Hajimaru Miracle" from Steel Angel Kurumi that became her favorite anime song. She joined her school's choir club and broadcast theater club to hone her vocal skills.

After deciding to pursue a career as a musician, Halca considered various singing auditions. After discovering Utakatsu! Audition, which focused on anime songs, she decided to participate in it; she won the second prize in 2013. After the audition, she continued training while waiting to make her major debut. In 2017 she was invited by the singer Chico, known for her involvement with the music group HoneyWorks, to participate in the latter's live tour as their opening act. Following this, she performed the song "Kimi no Sora" (キミの空; lit. "Your Sky"), which was included in a compilation album released to celebrate the 10th anniversary of the online novel publisher Noichigo. She also performed the song "Resonator", which was used in the soundtrack of the anime series Beatless, and made a mini-album titled White Disc, which was sold at the Honeyworks tour.

Halca made her major debut in 2018 with the release of her first single "Kimi no Tonari" (キミの隣; lit. "Next to You"); the title track of which was used as the closing theme for the anime series Wotakoi: Love Is Hard for Otaku. To commemorate the release of the single, White Disc was made available for sale during the single's release event. Her second single "Starting Blue" (スターティングブルー) was released in October 2018, with the title track being used as the closing theme for the second season of the Ace Attorney anime television series. Her third single "Sentimental Crisis" (センチメンタルクライシス) was released in February 2019; the title track is used as the closing theme for the anime series Kaguya-sama: Love Is War. Her fourth single "After School Liberty" (放課後のリバティ) was released on November 13, 2019; the title track is used as the closing theme to the second season of We Never Learn. Her fifth single "Kokuhaku Bungee Jump" (告白バンジージャンプ) was released in September 2020; the title track is used as the closing theme for the anime series Rent-A-Girlfriend. Her sixth single "Kimi ga Ita Shirushi" (キミがいたしるし) was released on May 19, 2021; the title track is used as a closing theme for the anime series Boruto: Naruto Next Generations.

== Discography ==
=== Singles ===
List of singles, with selected chart positions
Year	Single	Peak chart positions	Formats
Year	Single	JPN Physical	Formats
2018	"Kimi no Tonari" (キミの隣; lit. "Next to You")	44	CD, CD+DVD, digital download, streaming
2018	"Starting Blue" (スターティングブルー)	40	CD, CD+DVD, digital download, streaming
2019	"Sentimental Crisis" (センチメンタルクライシス)	26	CD, CD+DVD, digital download, streaming
2019	"Houkago no Liberty" (放課後のリバティ; lit. "After School Liberty")	39	CD, CD+DVD, digital download, streaming
2020	"Toki Toshite Violence" (時としてバイオレンス)	23	CD, CD+DVD, digital download, streaming
2020	"Kokuhaku Bungee Jump" (告白バンジージャンプ; lit. "Confession Bungee Jump")	23	CD, CD+DVD, digital download, streaming
2021	"Kimi ga Ita Shirushi" (キミがいたしるし)	34	CD, CD+DVD, digital download, streaming
2022	"Dare Kare Scramble/Are Kore Drastic feat. Suzuki Aina" (誰彼スクランブル / あれこれドラスティック feat. 鈴木愛奈)	24	CD, CD+DVD, digital download, streaming
2023	"Renai Millimeter Film" (恋愛ミリフィルム)	32	CD, CD+DVD, digital download, streaming
2024	"Good Luck Waker"	25	CD, CD+DVD, digital download, streaming
2024	"Shunkan Saidai Fūsoku" (瞬間最大風速)	29	CD, CD+DVD, digital download, streaming

=== Studio albums ===
List of albums, with selected chart positions
Title	Album details	Peak positions
Title	Album details	JPN Oricon
Assortrip	Released: February 12, 2020; Label: Sacra Music; Formats: CD, CD+DVD, digital download, streaming	39
Nolca Solca	Released: January 25, 2023; Label: Sacra Music; Formats: CD, CD+DVD, digital download, streaming	31

=== EP ===
List of albums, with selected chart positions
Title	Album details	Peak positions
Title	Album details	JPN Oricon
White Disc ++++	Released: August 28, 2019; Label: Sacra Music; Formats: CD, CD+DVD, digital download, streaming	40
