= Todome no Kiss =

- Also known as: Kiss that Kills
- Genre: Romance; Drama
- Written by: Yoshihiro Izumi
- Directed by: Shintaro Sugawara; Hiroto Akashi
- Starring: Kento Yamazaki; Mugi Kadowaki; Mackenyu; Yuko Araki; Hayato Sano; Jun Shison; Masaki Suda
- Opening theme: Sayonara Elegy by Masaki Suda
- Composer: Ken Arai
- Country of origin: Japan
- Original language: Japanese
- No. of episodes: 10

Production
- Running time: 50 minutes
- Production company: Nippon TV

Original release
- Network: Nippon TV
- Release: January 7 – March 11, 2018

Todome no Kiss (トドメの接吻; Kiss that Kills) is a 2018 Japanese television drama, starring Kento Yamazaki, Mugi Kadowaki, Mackenyu, Yuko Araki, Jun Shison, and Masaki Suda. It aired on Nippon TV from January 7 to March 11, 2018.

The short series titled Todome no Parallel (トドメのパラレル; Kiss that Kills -Parallel-) is distributed exclusively via Hulu Japan. The series is 10 9-minute episodes that are told from other characters's perspectives after Eight is kissed and/or dies, as well as 'what if' stories where the characters decide to do things differently from the original series.

== Cast ==
- Kento Yamazaki as Otaro Dojima / Eight
- Mugi Kadowaki as Saiko Sato (Kissing Woman)
- Mackenyu as Takauji Namiki
- Yuko Araki as Mikoto Namiki
- Hayato Sano as Hiroyuki Hasebe
- Jun Shison as Kazuma Osanai
- Masaki Suda (special appearance) as Kazunori Harumi
- Hio Miyazawa as Michinari Hotei
- Akane Hotta as Nao Mori
- Erika Karata as Marin Aota
- Ai Yamamoto as Nanako Koyanagi
- Yoshinori Okada as Koichi Nezu
- Ken Mitsuishi as Akira Dojima
- Kaoru Okunuki as Mitsuyo Dojima
- Tomohisa Yuge as Tsuji
- Meikyo Yamada as Takeru Namiki
- Hitomi Takahashi as Kyoko Namiki
- Mantaro Koichi as Gunji Arai

Preceded by Ima Kara Anata o Kyōhaku Shimasu; October 15, 2017 – December 17, 2017	Nippon TV Sunday Dramas; Sundays 22:30 – 23:25 (JST)	Succeeded by Gakeppuchi Hotel
