= Gordon Maeda =

Japanese actor (born 2000)

- 眞栄田 郷敦
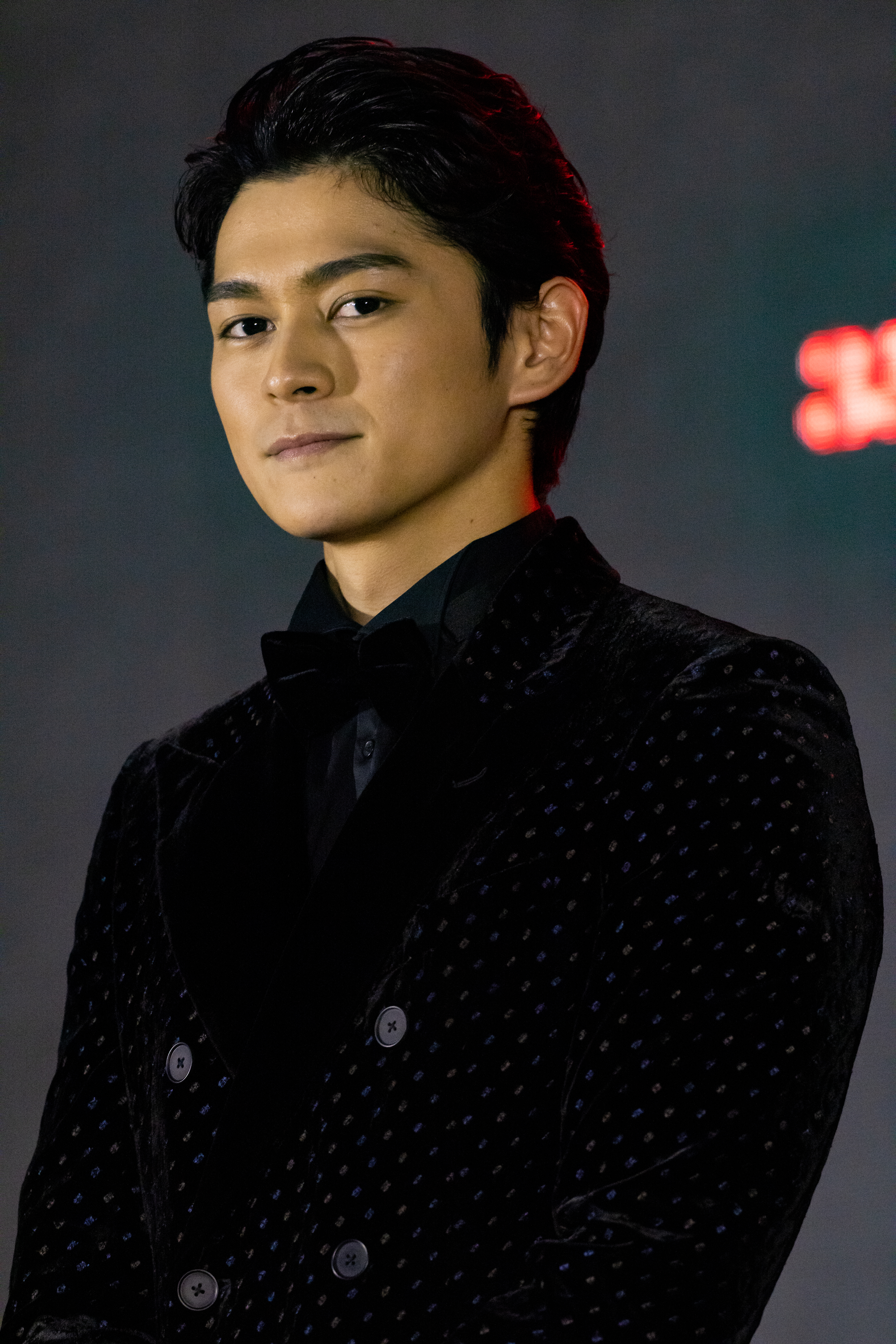
- Gordon Maeda in 2022
- Born: Gordon Maeda (前田 郷敦, Maeda Gōdon); January 9, 2000 (age 26); Santa Monica, California, U.S.
- Occupation: Actor
- Years active: 2018–present
- Children: 1
- Father: Sonny Chiba
- Relatives: Jirō Yabuki (uncle); Juri Manase (half-sister); Mackenyu (brother)
- Website: gordonmaeda.com

Gordon Maeda (眞栄田 郷敦, Maeda Gōdon; born January 9, 2000) is a Japanese-American actor. He is the son of actor and martial artist Sonny Chiba. Maeda is best known for portraying Takashi Mitsuya in the live-action movie adaptation of Tokyo Revengers and Hyakunosuke Ogata in the Golden Kamuy series.

== Early life ==
Maeda was born on January 9, 2000, in Los Angeles, California. He is the son of Japanese action actor Sonny Chiba and second wife Tamami. He has one brother Mackenyu and a half-sister Juri Manase from his father's previous marriage. Maeda lived in Beverly Hills for 12 years up to elementary school graduation, before moving to Japan with his mother. His parents divorced in 2015. He learned Kyokushin karate since the age of 5 and continued for 7 years. In elementary school, he was fascinated by saxophone upon his first encounter with the instrument. After entering junior high school in Kyoto, he joined the school's brass band and took a break from karate. It was a period in which he developed his desire to enroll at Tokyo University of the Arts with the goal of becoming professional saxophonist. In order to further pursue his dream he went to Meisei Gakuin, a private senior high school in Okayama which has highly reputable brass band and special course to go professional. He lived in the school dorm in Okayama throughout high school. Together with Meisei Gakuin brass band, he won silver and bronze awards at All-Japan Band Competition in 2016 and 2017. He started to consider going into showbiz after unexpectedly failing his entrance exam for Tokyo University of the Arts. He ultimately put his professional saxophonist dream to rest.

== Career ==
During a private screening of his brother's movie Over Drive in 2018, through his father he got acquainted with entertainment industry officials including production company ROBOT who offered him to star in youth movie which later become his silver screen debut, Little Love Song. He made his runway debut in Tokyo Girls Collection (TGC) Kitakyushu 2018. For his stage name, he changed kanji writing of his birth last name from 前田 (Mae-da) to 眞栄田 (Ma-e-da) because he wanted to include "真" character in it, just like his father and brother's stage names. He kicked off his acting debut by portraying student band guitarist Shinji Fukumura in music drama movie Little Love Song, released on May 24, 2019. Prior to filming the movie in Okinawa, the cast practiced playing their respective instruments for six months. Maeda joined the other cast members promoting the movie including performing on television music programs Music Station and Love Music as the Chiisana Koi no Uta Band. In July 2019, he starred in sports-themed TV drama No Side Manager as Keita Nanao, an ex-rugby player returnee from New Zealand. He got the role for the drama through three stages of audition. He gained 15 kg in the span of 3 months to prepare for the audition so his body could mimic that of a rugby player.

In January 2022, it was announced that Maeda would be making his first public channel drama leading role in live-action adaptation of Kanakana as former delinquent Masanao Higurashi. In summer 2022, Maeda was in a thriller movie based on the popular web novel Karada Sagashi, starring Kanna Hashimoto whom he had previously worked with in 2019 movie Come Kiss Me at 0:00 AM. In July 2022 it was reported that Maeda would appear in Fuji TV fall drama Elpis as young director, Takuro Kishimoto. In the beginning of 2023, Maeda portrayed Takeda Katsuyori in the NHK Taiga drama What Will You Do, Ieyasu? This was his first Taiga drama appearance.

== Personal life ==
On January 22, 2023 through his official fan club page, Maeda announced that he had married his non-celebrity girlfriend. In July of the same year, his agency announced that Maeda's wife had given birth to their first child. However, in the following year, on October 2, 2024, it was reported that Maeda and his wife had gotten divorced after less than two years of marriage.

== Filmography ==
=== Television drama ===
Year	Title	Role	Notes	Ref.
2019	No Side Manager	Keita Nanao		
2020	I Can Meet You Three More Times	Seishiro Michibayashi	TV movie	
2020	My Housekeeper Nagisa-san	Haruto Segawa		
2021	Kyojo II	Takashi Inabe	Miniseries	
2021	With You Who Wanted to be a Star	Shusei Washigami	Lead role, miniseries	
2021	The Romance Manga Artist	Togo Nikaido		
2021	Promise Cinderella	Issei Kataoka		
2021	Kinnikuman: The Lost Legend	himself	Lead role, pseudo-documentary	
2022	Kanakana	Masanao Higurashi	Lead role	
2022	Elpis	Takurō Kishimoto		
2023	What Will You Do, Ieyasu?	Takeda Katsuyori	Taiga drama	
2024	366 Days	Haruto Mizuno		
2024–27	Golden Kamuy: The Hunt of Prisoners in Hokkaido / Karafuto Pursuit Arc	Hyakunosuke Ogata	2 seasons	
2025	Anpan	Osamu Tejima	Asadora	
2027	The Shogunate Rebel	Emperor Kōmei	Taiga drama	

=== Web drama ===
Year	Title	Role	Notes
2020	My Subordinate Haruto-kun	Haruto Segawa	Lead role, spin-off of My Housekeeper Nagisa-san
2021	With You Who Wanted to be a Star -another story-	Shusei Washigami	Lead role, alternate retelling of With You Who Wanted to be a Star
2021	Renai Kakutoka	Togo Nikaido	Lead role, spin-off of The Romance Manga Artist
2021	Cinderella Complex	Issei Kataoka	Guest role (episode 5), spin-off of Promise Cinderella

=== Theatrical film ===
Year	Title	Role	Notes	Ref.
2019	Little Love Song	Shinji Fukumura		
2019	Come Kiss Me at 0:00 AM	Akira Hamabe		
2021	Jump!! The Heroes Behind the Gold	Takashi Minamikawa		
2021	Tokyo Revengers	Takashi Mitsuya		
2022	Re/Member	Takahiro Ise		
2022	Lightning Over the Beyond	Hikari	Lead role	
2023	Tokyo Revengers 2: Bloody Halloween Part 1	Takashi Mitsuya		
2023	Tokyo Revengers 2: Bloody Halloween Part 2	Takashi Mitsuya		
2024	Golden Kamuy	Hyakunosuke Ogata		
2024	Blue Period	Yatora Yaguchi	Lead role	
2025	Babanba Banban Vampire	Mori Nagayoshi		
2025	Re/Member: The Last Night	Takahiro Ise		
2025	A Light in the Harbor	Kota (adult)		
2025	Wind Breaker	Legendary Furin Student		
2026	Golden Kamuy: The Abashiri Prison Raid	Hyakunosuke Ogata		

=== Variety Show ===
Year	Title	Network	Notes	Ref.
2019	Mezamashi TV	Fuji TV	Monthly presenter (December)	

== Awards and nominations ==
Year	Award	Category	Work(s)	Result	Ref.
2021	31st Yubari International Fantastic Film Festival	New Wave Award	Tokyo Revengers and Jump!! The Heroes Behind the Gold	Won	
2021	Nikkei Trendy's Choice	Face of Next Year	Promise Cinderella	Won	
2021	46th Hochi Film Awards	Best New Artist	Jump!! The Heroes Behind the Gold	Nominated	
2021	Yahoo! Search Awards 2021	Actors		Won	
2021	34th Nikkan Sports Film Awards	Yūjirō Ishihara Newcomer Award	Tokyo Revengers and Jump!! The Heroes Behind the Gold	Won	
2022	64th Blue Ribbon Awards	Best Newcomer	Jump!! The Heroes Behind the Gold	Nominated	
2024	48th Elan d'or Awards	Newcomer of the Year	Himself	Won	
