= JoJo's Bizarre Adventure: Diamond Is Unbreakable – Chapter 1 =

2017 film by Takashi Miike

- Theatrical release poster, featuring Kento Yamazaki as Josuke Higashikata
- Japanese: ジョジョの奇妙な冒険 ダイヤモンドは砕けない 第一章
- Directed by: Takashi Miike
- Screenplay by: Itaru Era
- Based on: JoJo's Bizarre Adventure by Hirohiko Araki
- Produced by: Tetsuo Gensho; Misako Saka
- Starring: Kento Yamazaki; Ryunosuke Kamiki; Nana Komatsu; Masaki Okada; Mackenyu Arata; Takayuki Yamada; Yusuke Iseya
- Cinematography: Nobuyasu Kita
- Edited by: Kenji Yamashita
- Music by: Koji Endo
- Production company: OLM
- Distributed by: Toho; Warner Bros. Pictures
- Release dates: July 2, 2017 (Neuchâtel); August 4, 2017 (Japan)
- Running time: 119 minutes
- Country: Japan
- Language: Japanese
- Box office: ¥920 million

JoJo's Bizarre Adventure: Diamond Is Unbreakable – Chapter 1 (Japanese: ジョジョの奇妙な冒険 ダイヤモンドは砕けない 第一章, Hepburn: JoJo no Kimyō na Bōken Daiyamondo wa Kudakenai Dai-Isshō) is a 2017 Japanese action fantasy film directed by Takashi Miike from a screenplay by Itaru Era. It is based on the Diamond Is Unbreakable story arc of the manga series JoJo's Bizarre Adventure by Hirohiko Araki. Covering the first seventeen chapters, the film stars Kento Yamazaki, Ryunosuke Kamiki, Nana Komatsu, Masaki Okada, Mackenyu Arata, Takayuki Yamada and Yusuke Iseya. It was released in Japan by Toho and Warner Bros. Pictures on August 4, 2017. It was licensed for North American release by Viz Media.

== Plot ==
In M-Prefecture's fictional town of Morioh, which has been plagued by a series of mysterious murders, Josuke Higashikata is a second-year high school student who befriends new student Koichi Hirose while displaying strange powers in fixing Koichi's bicycle. Josuke later foils a convenience store robbery by a delinquent acting under the influence of a water-like creature. Josuke then encounters Jotaro Kujo, introducing himself as the youth's nephew while explaining that Josuke is the illegitimate son of his grandfather, Joseph Joestar. Despite a brief fight from a misunderstanding, explaining their Stand psychic embodiments while displaying the time manipulative ability of his Stand, Star Platinum, Jotaro warns Josuke that the murders are being caused by another Stand user. Josuke realizes the creature he saw the other day was a Stand, unaware that its user is a serial killer named Anjuro "Angelo" Katagiri who intends to kill the student for his interference. The next day, Angelo has his Stand, Aqua Necklace, sneak into the Higashikata residence and, despite failing to kill Josuke's mother Tomoko, murders his grandfather Ryohei as Jotaro arrives to the youth's aid. The two are overwhelmed by Aqua Necklace until Josuke tricks it into entering a rubber glove he secretly swallowed. Upon finding Angelo, Josuke uses his Stand, Crazy Diamond, to fuse him into a rock while the serial killer reveals that he acquired his power from a mysterious arrow-wielding high school student.

During Ryohei's funeral, Josuke and Koichi follow a youth named Keicho Nijimura, Angelo's benefactor, to a derelict house where they are jumped by both him and his younger brother Okuyasu. As Okuyasu and his Stand The Hand hold off Josuke, Keicho drags Koichi into the house after shooting an arrow through his neck. Josuke chases them after defeating Okuyasu who took a hit from Keicho's Stand Bad Company. Josuke's act of healing Okuyasu is rewarded when the latter helps him rescue Koichi while not intending to stand in their way of searching for the bow and arrow. Keicho goes on the offense in forcing Koichi to manifest his Stand, disappointed that it is a large egg, before being defeated with Josuke and Koichi finding an immortal abomination soon after. Keicho reveals this creature to be his father whose condition is the result of being a follower of Dio Brando, explaining that he has been creating Stand Users in the hopes that one of them might be able to end his father's suffering. Josuke, deducing that Mr. Nijimura has not completely lost his sense of self after using Crazy Diamond to repair a valued family photograph, offers to help the Nijimura brothers restore their father's humanity despite Keicho being hesitant to hand the bow and arrow to him. However, as a Stand called Sheer Heart Attack suddenly attacks, Keicho sacrifices himself to protect Okuyasu. Josuke later meets again with Jotaro, swearing to continue his grandfather's work of protecting Morioh as Koichi and Okuyasu proceed to support him.

In a mid-credits scene, a house is shown with a paper bag on a table, containing a severed hand and an arrow in its clutch. This references the overarching antagonist of the manga series, Yoshikage Kira.

== Cast ==
- Kento Yamazaki as Josuke Higashikata
- Ryunosuke Kamiki as Koichi Hirose
- Nana Komatsu as Yukako Yamagishi
- Masaki Okada as Keicho Nijimura
- Mackenyu Arata as Okuyasu Nijimura
- Takayuki Yamada as Anjuro Katagiri
- Yusuke Iseya as Jotaro Kujo
- Alisa Mizuki as Tomoko Higashikata
- Jun Kunimura as Ryohei Higashikata

== Production ==
In September 2016, it was announced that Toho and Warner Bros. were partnering to produce a live-action film based on the fourth arc of Hirohiko Araki's JoJo's Bizarre Adventure manga for release sometime in summer 2017. Both studios planned for worldwide distribution and, with the "Chapter I" in the title, were hoping to create sequels.

In November 2016, producer Takashi Hirano said he had been trying to adapt JoJo's Bizarre Adventure for 10 years and acquired the rights from Araki about 5 years ago. Hirano said he chose to adapt Diamond is Unbreakable first because he felt that it is the most beloved story arc of the series. In early phases of production, he had considered changing details about the characters and story, for example giving the protagonist a non-Japanese name and background, but decided against it.

Director Takashi Miike was already familiar with the manga. He said he wanted the film to have a slightly Western feel and to be able to incorporate some of the large buildings that appear in the original work. Miike recalled the Spanish city of Sitges, which he had visited for the Sitges Film Festival, and decided to film there. Principal photography took place in Japan and Sitges. In Spain, Miike had to use a local crew that did not speak Japanese. According to Kaori Ohtagaki of OLM, Inc., live-action filming took only about a month and a half to two months, while the visual effects took almost a full year.

== Reception ==
Following its world premiere at the Neuchâtel International Fantastic Film Festival, JoJo's Bizarre Adventure: Diamond Is Unbreakable Chapter I won the Audience Award.

The film opened at number five at the Japanese box office, before dropping to number 11 its second week. As a result, an insider told Oricon that this put the studios' plans for sequels in doubt.

In a review for Anime News Network, Kim Morrissy called the film a "surprisingly decent" manga adaptation that is accessible to new viewers and praised the action scenes and pacing. Calling it tightly scripted and cohesive from start to finish, she felt that by removing some villains and merging the roles of others, it marks an improvement over the source material's "monster of the week" storylines and works better as a feature-length film. However, Morrissy felt that replacing the manga's flamboyant style and bright colors with a dark and heavy story makes it much less fun to watch.

Giving it a 3 out of 5 rating, the Nerdist's Scott Beggs called JoJo's Bizarre Adventure: Diamond Is Unbreakable Chapter I energetic, imaginative and fun, but fatally flawed. He praised the detailed visuals which result in a "movie that uses real people and places to look like an anime" and the fast-paced first half as consistently funny. However, he called the second half "unbelievably slow" and "bogged down even further" by the addition of more plot elements. Unfamiliar with the source material, Beggs wrote that a lot of information is given; some of which gets an expository explanation, while some never gets explained at all.

Matt Donato of /Film gave the film a 6.5 out of 10 rating and wrote that, while it provides "slap-your-cheeks insanity" with action and oddities, it is "uneven, cobbled haphazardly and causes fatigue." Also unfamiliar with the source material, he wrote that it gives so much information to process, that the two-hour length feels doubly long. Donato also criticized the story's multiple false endings. Matt Schley of Otaku USA gave the film a negative review for its pacing and "gross color palette." Acknowledging that it is Part I, he stated that its slow pace causes "virtually none" of the plot threads to reach any conclusions.
