= Hyouka: Forbidden Secrets =

- Film poster

Japanese name
- Kanji: 氷菓
Transcriptions
- Revised Hepburn: Hyōka
- Directed by: Mari Asato
- Screenplay by: Mari Asato
- Based on: Hyouka by Honobu Yonezawa
- Produced by: Shinichirō Inoue (Executive); Go Kobayashi; Ryosuke Yamagata
- Starring: Kento Yamazaki; Alice Hirose; Amane Okayama; Fujiko Kojima; Kanata Hongo; Yuki Saito
- Cinematography: Yuta Tsukinaga
- Edited by: Masaki Murakami
- Music by: Yūsuke Hayashi; OLO
- Production company: Kadokawa Daiei Studio
- Distributed by: Kadokawa Pictures
- Release date: November 3, 2017 (Japan)
- Running time: 114 minutes
- Country: Japan
- Language: Japanese
- Box office: ¥130,000,000

Hyouka: Forbidden Secrets (Japanese: 氷菓, Hepburn: Hyōka) is a 2017 Japanese mystery film based on the novel Hyouka by Honobu Yonezawa. It stars Kento Yamazaki and Alice Hirose, and it is directed by Mari Asato. It was released on November 3, 2017 and distributed by Kadokawa Pictures.

== Plot ==
Hotarou Oreki (Kento Yamazaki) is a freshman at Kamiyama high school. He's lazy and his motto is, "If I don’t have to do it, I won’t. If I have to do it, I’ll make it quick". He does not want to participate in any club activities at his school but he joins the Classic Literature club when his older sister tells him she had been a member and it is about to die off because of disinterest in it. She asks him to join and he is unable to refuse things she asks of him. There, he meets Eru Chitanda (Alice Hirose), an innocent girl with great curiosity from one of the most prominent families in that town. Two of Hotarou's friends, Satoshi Fukube (Amane Okayama) and Mayaka Ibara (Fujiko Kojima), also become members of the club. They solve various mysteries in their school including the most important one. Eru's uncle, Jun Sekiya (Kanata Hongo), had been a member of the club and a Hyouka anthology which was published 33 years ago relates to his disappearance 10 years earlier. Eru asks Hotarou to find out what her uncle said to her when she was a child that made her cry. The four of them begin trying to reveal what really happened to Eru's uncle, which ends up being related to the Hyouka anthology and their school festival.

== Cast ==
- Kento Yamazaki as Hotarou Oreki
- Alice Hirose as Eru Chitanda
- Amane Okayama as Satoshi Fukube
- Fujiko Kojima as Mayaka Ibara
- Kanata Hongo as Jun Sekiya
- Yuki Saito as Yoko Itoigawa
