= Kanakana =

Japanese manga series

- First tankōbon volume cover

カナカナ
- Genre: Comedy
- Manga
- Written by: Hiroyuki Nishimori
- Published by: Shogakukan
- Imprint: Shōnen Sunday Comics
- Magazine: Shōnen Sunday S
- Original run: June 25, 2020 – present
- Volumes: 6
- Television drama
- Directed by: Yо̄ Kawahara; Toshiyuki Morishita
- Produced by: Kiyoshi Umibe; Jun Kurosawa
- Written by: Shuko Arai; Rima Kitaki
- Music by: Aki Manabe; Yuki Munakata
- Studio: NHK; Telepack
- Original network: NHK
- Original run: May 16, 2022 – June 30, 2022
- Episodes: 28
- icon

Kanakana (カナカナ) is a Japanese manga series written and illustrated by Hiroyuki Nishimori. It has been serialized in Shogakukan's shōnen manga magazine Shōnen Sunday S since June 2020; the series finished its first part in September 2023. A television drama adaptation was broadcast for 28 episodes on NHK from May to June 2022.

== Characters ==
Masanao Higurashi (日暮 正直, Masanao Higurashi)
Portrayed by: Gordon Maeda

== Media ==
=== Manga ===
Written and illustrated by Hiroyuki Nishimori, Kanakana started in Shogakukan's shōnen manga magazine Shōnen Sunday S on June 25, 2020. It finished its first part on September 25, 2023. Shogakukan has collected its chapters into individual tankōbon volumes. The first volume was released on December 18, 2020. As of November 17, 2023, six volumes have been released.

==== Volumes ====
No.	Japanese release date	Japanese ISBN
1	December 18, 2020	978-4-09-850369-8
2	July 16, 2021	978-4-09-850685-9
3	February 18, 2022	978-4-09-851009-2
4	July 15, 2022	978-4-09-851208-9
5	April 18, 2023	978-4-09-852036-7
6	November 17, 2023	978-4-09-853039-7

=== Drama ===
In January 2022, it was announced that the manga would receive a television drama adaptation; it was broadcast for 28 episodes on NHK from May 16 to June 30 of the same year.

== Reception ==
Spy × Family's author, Tatsuya Endo, recommended the series in a comment featured on the obi of the fourth volume.
