= Kento Yamazaki =

Japanese actor and model (born 1994)

- 山﨑賢人
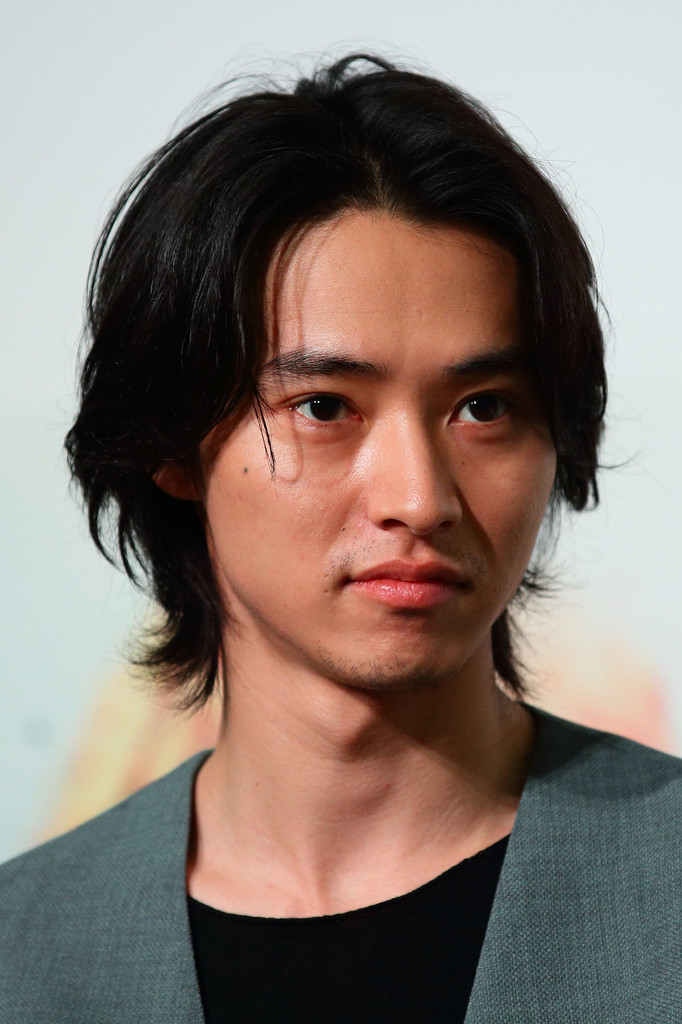
- Yamazaki in 2019
- Born: Kento Yamazaki; September 7, 1994 (age 32); Itabashi, Tokyo, Japan
- Occupations: Actor; model
- Years active: 2009–present
- Website: Yamazaki Kento

Kento Yamazaki (山﨑賢人, Yamazaki Kento; born September 7, 1994) is a Japanese actor and model. He is best known for starring in manga adaptations, including the films Another (film) (2012), Jinx!!! (2013), L DK (2014), Orange (2015), Your Lie in April (2016), JoJo's Bizarre Adventure: Diamond Is Unbreakable Chapter I (2017), Psychic Kusuo: The Disastrous Life of Saiki K. (2017), Kingdom (2019), and television series Death Note (2015) and Alice in Borderland (2020–2025). His other notable works include Kiss That Kills (2018) and Good Doctor (2018). Yamazaki is under the Japanese talent agency Stardust Promotion.

== Early life ==
Yamazaki was born in Tokyo, Japan on September 7, 1994. His family consists of his mother, father, and an older brother seven years his senior.As a kid he grew up playing and loving soccer.His entry to the entertainment industry was when he was discovered by a talent scout from Stardust Promotion.After that he eventually got into acting.

== Career ==
=== 2009–2013: Beginnings ===
Yamazaki was scouted during his third year of junior high school by his agency, Stardust Promotion, on Takeshita Street, Harajuku while on his way home from a soccer match. He began his career working as a model for the magazine Pichi Lemon from 2009 to 2011.

Yamazaki made his acting debut in 2010 when he was cast in the TV series Atami no Sousakan as a mysterious high school student. This was followed by a supporting role in the TV series Clone Baby, where he played a hacker.

The following year, Yamazaki made his film debut in Control Tower, which was released in April 2011. He sang and played the guitar in the film, for which his acting was well received.

In 2012, he appeared in the film The Wings of the Kirin. He also starred as the lead in the horror thriller film Another, working with his Control Tower co-star Ai Hashimoto for a second time. He was subsequently cast in the films The Chasing World 3 and the live-action adaptation of Love for Beginners.

In 2013, he led the LGBTQ-themed television film Sato Family Breakfast. For his participation in the film, he attended the 2nd Taiwan International Queer Film Festival in 2015. In addition to that, he took on a supporting role in the film Jinx!!! and the TV series 35-sai no Koukousei.

=== 2014–2017: Breakthrough and success in manga adaptations ===
In 2014, Yamazaki made a breakthrough in his career starring in the live-action film adaptation of the highly successful manga L DK, alongside Ayame Goriki. The film's success garnered him greater public attention. That same year, he acted in three drama series, including Baseball Brainiacs, where he was cast alongside actors Sota Fukushi and Yuto Nakajima. He also made his stage debut in Satomi Hakkenden as the main lead Inuzuka Shino.

In 2015, he was again cast in a film adaptation of a popular manga with No Longer Heroine, alongside Mirei Kiritani. He then played the lead role in Orange, alongside Tao Tsuchiya. Both films were a success, with No Longer Heroine premiering number one at the Japanese box office and earning US$20.5 million. While Orange grossed almost US$28 million, becoming the 9th highest-grossing Japanese film of 2016. For his roles in those two films, he won the Newcomer of the Year award at the 39th Japan Academy Film Prize and was also nominated at the 2016 Hochi Film Awards. That same year, he appeared in the television adaptation of the popular manga series Death Note as L, and the NHK Asadora Mare, led by Tsuchiya Tao.

In 2016, Yamazaki starred in Your Lie in April. He played the lead role of Kosei Arima, a gifted pianist, alongside Suzu Hirose, who portrayed Kaori Miyazono. For the role, Yamazaki had to learn how to play the piano and practiced for six months prior to the commencement of filming. Thereafter, he starred in the live-action adaptation of Wolf Girl and Black Prince and the TV series A Girl & Three Sweethearts. That same year, Yamazaki was chosen to star in a special short film to celebrate the 10th anniversary of Yasuhisa Hara's historical manga Kingdom as the main character, Xin. He would go on to reprise this role in the 2019 live-action feature film, which was released on April 19, 2019.

In 2017, he co-starred with Haruna Kawaguchi in One Week Friends. The film received positive ratings from critics, which mostly praised Yamazaki for successfully portraying the cheerful and friendly Yuki Hase. He would then continue to appear in other live-action films throughout the year, including JoJo's Bizarre Adventure: Diamond Is Unbreakable Chapter I, Psychic Kusuo: The Disastrous Life of Saiki K., and Hyouka: Forbidden Secrets. Towards the end of 2017, he starred in the TV series Rikuoh.

=== 2018–present: Leading roles ===
In January 2018, Yamazaki secured his first leading role in a television series, playing Ōtarō Dōjima, a top nightclub host, in the NTV winter drama Kiss that Kills, alongside Mugi Kadowaki, Mackenyu and Masaki Suda. His film A Forest of Wool and Steel was released that same year, where he portrayed a piano tuner. In preparation for the film, Yamazaki lived in Hokkaido to learn and practice piano tuning. He also met the Emperor and Empress of Japan in a special screening of the film. In the summer of 2018, Yamazaki was cast in the TV series Good Doctor. Based on the 2013 South Korean drama of the same name, it tells the story of a young autistic man who becomes a pediatric surgeon. The drama received a positive response from viewers, and it was the first time Yamazaki acted as a doctor and took on a more unconventional role. It earned him the Television Drama Academy Award for Best Actor.

In 2019, Yamazaki was cast in the Netflix series Alice in Borderland, a live-action adaptation of the manga series of the same name, in the lead role of Ryōhei Arisu. The series premiered on Netflix on December 10, 2020. The show was a success. Within the first few weeks of its release, it "ranked in the top ten most-watched shows" on the platform in nearly 40 territories. On December 24, 2020, Netflix renewed the series for a second season, two weeks after the first one had been released.

In 2020, Yamazaki also starred in the live-action film adaptation of Wotakoi: Love is Hard for Otaku. He played the lead role of Hirotaka Nifuji, an aloof working adult who is a huge fan of video games. The film was released in February 2020. He also starred in Theatre: A Love Story as a struggling theatre director.

In 2021, he starred in the sci-fi drama film The Door into Summer, loosely based on the novel of the same name. In 2022, following the first film's release in 2019, Yamazaki reprised his role as Li Xin in the sequel film Kingdom 2: Far and Away. He then went on to star in the lead role of Nayuta Azumi, an indie game developer, in the TV series Atom’s Last Shot. Later that year, the second season of Alice in Borderland premiered worldwide on December 22, 2022.

On September 27, 2023, Netflix renewed Alice in Borderland for a third season, which is set to be released in September 2025.

== Personal life ==
Yamazaki's close friends in the entertainment industry include fellow actor Masaki Suda, whom he worked with in Kiss That Kills (2018), and South Korean singer Jeonghan.

== Filmography ==
=== Film ===
Year	Title	Role	Notes	Ref.
2011	Control Tower	Kakeru	Lead role	
2012	The Wings of the Kirin	Tatsuya Sugino		
2012	Another	Kōichi Sakakibara	Lead role	
2012	The Chasing World 3	Suguru	Lead role	
2012	The Chasing World 5	Suguru		
2012	Love for Beginners	Nishiki Hasegawa		
2013	Jinx!!!	Yūsuke Nomura		
2014	L DK	Shūsei Kugayama	Lead role	
2015	No Longer Heroine	Rita Terasaka		
2015	Orange	Kakeru Naruse	Lead role	
2016	Your Lie in April	Kōsei Arima	Lead role	
2016	Wolf Girl and Black Prince	Kyōya Sata	Lead role	
2016	Yo-Kai Watch The Movie 3: A Whale of Two Worlds	King Enma		
2017	One Week Friends	Yūki Hase	Lead role	
2017	Poetry Angel	Man attending at briefing session	Cameo	
2017	JoJo's Bizarre Adventure: Diamond Is Unbreakable Chapter I	Jōsuke Higashikata	Lead role	
2017	Psychic Kusuo: The Disastrous Life of Saiki K.	Kusuo Saiki	Lead role	
2017	Hyouka: Forbidden Secrets	Hōtarō Oreki	Lead role	
2018	A Forest of Wool and Steel	Naoki Tomura	Lead role	
2019	Kingdom	Xin	Lead role	
2019	NiNoKuni	Yū (voice)	Lead role	
2020	Wotakoi: Love is Hard for Otaku	Hirotaka Nifuji	Lead role	
2020	Theatre: A Love Story	Nagata	Lead role	
2020	Crazy Samurai Musashi	Chūsuke		
2021	The Door into Summer	Sōichirō Takakura	Lead role	
2022	Kingdom 2: Far and Away	Xin	Lead role	
2023	Kingdom 3: The Flame of Destiny	Xin	Lead role	
2024	Golden Kamuy	Saichi Sugimoto	Lead role	
2024	The Yin Yang Master Zero	Abe no Seimei	Lead role	
2024	Kingdom 4: Return of the Great General	Xin	Lead role	
2025	Under Ninja	Kurō Kumogakure	Lead role	
2026	Golden Kamuy: The Abashiri Prison Raid	Saichi Sugimoto	Lead role	
2026	Kingdom 5: The Clash of Souls	Xin	Lead role	
2027	The Gate of Murder	Kuramochi	Lead role	
2027	Hara o Kukutte		Lead role	

=== Television ===
Year	Title	Role	Notes	Ref.
2010	Atami no Sousakan	Shinya Shijima		
2010	Clone Baby	Jōtarō Okabe		
2011	Runaways: For Your Love	Panda		
2012	Miss Double Faced Teacher	Shunsuke Yasuda		
2013	No Dropping Out: Back to School at 35	Ryo Akutsu		
2013	Sato Family's Breakfast, Suzuki Family's Dinner	Takumi Sato	TV movie	
2014	Team Batista 4: Raden Meikyu	Aoi Sakuranomiya		
2014	Water Polo Yankees	Ryuji Mifune		
2014	Baseball Brainiacs	Kōki Ebato		
2015	Mare	Keita Kontani	Asadora	
2015	Eternal Us Sea Side Blue	Taku Nagata	TV movie	
2015	Death Note	L		
2016	A Girl & Three Sweethearts	Kanata Shibasaki		
2017	Rikuoh	Daichi Miyazawa		
2018	Kiss that Kills	Ōtarō Dōjima	Lead role	
2018	Good Doctor	Minato Shindō	Lead role	
2018	From Today, It's My Turn!!	Katori	Episode 10; cameo	
2019	Time Limit Investigator 2019	Shota Amaya	Episode 8	
2020	Only I Am 17 Years Old	Passerby	Episode 4; cameo	
2020–2025	Alice in Borderland	Ryōhei Arisu	Lead role; 3 seasons	
2022	Atom's Last Shot	Nayuta Azumi	Lead role	
2024–2027	Golden Kamuy: The Hunt of Prisoners in Hokkaido / Karafuto Pursuit Arc	Saichi Sugimoto	Lead role; 2 seasons	
2028	John Mung	John Manjirō	Lead role; Taiga drama	

=== Music video appearances ===
Year	Title	Artist	Ref.
2011	"Ressha"	Karasu	
2018	"Sayonara Elegy"	Masaki Suda	

== Stage performances ==
- 2014 里見八犬伝 / Satomi Hakkenden role: Inuzuka Shino (Lead)
- 2017 里見八犬伝 / Satomi Hakkenden (2017) role: Inuzuka Shino (Lead)

== Bibliography ==
=== Photobooks ===
- Yamazaki Kento "You Are Here"(Genzaichi) (Wani Books, March 27, 2014) ISBN 9784847046292
- The Kentos (Tokyo News Service, December 17, 2014) ISBN 9784863364462
- Scene #20 (KADOKAWA, September 26, 2015) ISBN 9784047319813
- 山﨑賢人写真集「KENTO YAMAZAKI」 (KADOKAWA, April 24, 2019) ISBN 9784048963695

== Accolades ==
=== Awards and nominations ===
Year	Award	Category	Nominated work	Result	Ref.
2016	39th Japan Academy Film Prize	Newcomer of the Year	No Longer Heroine, Orange	Won	
2018	Beijing IQiyi Scream Night Award	Asian Newcomer of The Year	Good Doctor, Kiss That Kills	Won	
2020	Weibo Account Festival	Best Actor	Alice in Borderland, Kingdom	Won	
2024	23rd New York Asian Film Festival	Best from the East Award	Kingdom series	Won	
2024	Line News Awards	Person of the Year Award – Actor Category	Golden Kamuy, Kingdom 4: Return of the Great General	Won	
2024	Elle Cinema Awards	Elle Men Award	Kingdom 4: Return of the Great General	Won	
2025	67th Blue Ribbon Awards	Best Actor	Golden Kamuy, Kingdom 4: Return of the Great General, The Yin Yang Master Zero	Nominated	
2025	48th Japan Academy Film Prize	Best Actor	Kingdom 4: Return of the Great General	Nominated	
2025	Weibo Culture Exchange Night	Best Actor	Alice in Borderland, Golden Kamuy, Kingdom 4: Return of the Great General	Won	

=== Listicles ===
Name of publisher, year listed, name of listicle, and placement
Publisher	Year	Listicle	Placement	Ref.
Forbes	2020	Forbes Asia's 100 Digital Stars	Included	
