= A Loving Husband =

- Directed by: Kazuhiko Yukawa
- Written by: Kazuhiko Yukawa
- Based on: Famiresui by Kiyoshi Shigematsu
- Produced by: Hidenori Iyoda
- Starring: Hiroshi Abe; Yūki Amami; Miho Kanno; Saki Aibu; Asuka Kudoh; Akari Hayami; Kaoru Okunuki; Jiro Sato; Sumiko Fuji
- Cinematography: Takeshi Hamada
- Edited by: Masaki Murakami
- Music by: Mamiko Hirai
- Distributed by: Toho
- Release dates: August 25, 2016 (Festival des Films du Monde Montreal); January 28, 2017
- Running time: 117 minutes
- Country: Japan
- Language: Japanese

A Loving Husband (恋妻家宮本, Koisaika Miyamoto) is a 2016 Japanese drama directed by Kazuhiko Yukawa, based on the novel Families by Kiyoshi Shigematsu. By the first screenings, the film had earned ¥104 million (US$0.923 million).

== Plot ==
Yohei Miyamoto and Miyoko originally met at a matchmaking party at a family restaurant while at university days. Yohei planned to go on to grad school, and Miyoko had plans to be a teacher. However, Miyoko got pregnant. Yohei was confused, but did the honorable choice and proposed Miyoko. To support them, he took on Miyoko's role as a teacher.

The couple is forced to deal with their feelings for each other when their one child, Tadashi (Jingi Irie), gets married and becomes independent. Yohei and Miyoko only have each other as a company for the first time and are taken back to their original circumstances. Then one day, Yohei finds out that Miyoko has filled out the divorce papers, after they drop out of a book. Will Miyoko give them to him?

== Cast ==
- Hiroshi Abe as Yohei Miyamoto
- Yuki Amami as Miyoko
- Miho Kanno
- Saki Aibu
- Asuka Kudoh as young Yohei
- Akari Hayami as young Miyoko
- Aimi Satsukawa
- Hana Toyoshima
- Seishuu Uragami
- Makiko Watanabe
- Ayaka Konno
- Jingi Irie
- Kaoru Okunuki
- Jiro Sato
- Sumiko Fuji
