= The Door into Summer (film) =

2021 film by Takahiro Miki

- Theatrical release poster
- Directed by: Takahiro Miki
- Screenplay by: Tomoe Kanno
- Based on: The Door into Summer by Robert A. Heinlein
- Produced by: Shinji Ogawa; Chieko Murata; Shinzo Matsuhashi; Yuya Satoyoshi
- Starring: Kento Yamazaki; Kaya Kiyohara; Naohito Fujiki; Natsuna; Hidekazu Mashima
- Cinematography: Mitsuru Komiyama
- Edited by: Tsuyoshi Wada
- Music by: Yuki Hayashi
- Production company: CREDEUS
- Distributed by: Toho; Aniplex
- Release date: June 25, 2021
- Running time: 118 minutes
- Country: Japan
- Language: Japanese

The Door into Summer (Japanese: 夏への扉: キミのいる未来へ, Hepburn: Natsu e no Tobira: Kimi no Iru Mirai e) is a 2021 Japanese science fiction film directed by Takahiro Miki and starring Kento Yamazaki, Kaya Kiyohara, Naohito Fujiki, Natsuna, and Hidekazu Mashima. Based on Robert A. Heinlein's novel of the same name, it was released on June 25, 2021.

== Plot summary ==
In 1995, robotics engineer and inventor Soichiro Takakura loses his late adoptive father and mentor Dr. Matsushita's company Future Works Enterprises (FWE) to his business partner Kazuhito Matsushita and company secretary Rin Shiraishi. Rin had been Soichiro's fiancee, who manipulated him into giving her enough voting stock to allow her and Kazuhito to seize control. Soichiro's only remaining friends in the world are Riko Matsushita, the daughter of his late guardian, as well as his cat Pete, a feisty tabbycat who hates going outdoors into the snow.

Left with a large financial settlement and a handful of FWE shares, a drunken Soichiro opts to undertake "cold sleep" (suspended animation) at Credeus in hopes of waking up thirty years later to a more hopeful future. However, after sobering up and attempting to confront Kazuhito at the latter’s home, he discovers Rin, who subdues him and instead arranges for him to be frozen by associates at a subsidiary of Mannix Enterprises, as payment for a past favor.

Soichiro awakens in 2025 with no money to his name, with what little remained of his settlement gone with the collapse of Mannix due to tax fraud in the intervening years. He has lost Pete the cat, who fled after Soichiro was drugged, as well as Riko, who was killed in an explosion at the old Matsushita family home during FWE's seizure of Soichiro's research towards his prototype A-1 humanoid robot. While recuperating at the cold sleep clinic, he learns that lifelike service androids - including his assigned chaperone PETE-13 - have become commonplace in the future, with the market dominated by Guardian Manufacturing and Aladdin Industries.

Following a hunch from Rin, now a drunk and obese pensioner, Soichiro sets out to track down the fate of his FWE shares intended for Riko. He learns from Guardian CEO Gota Tsuboi that their company brought out FWE years before, but the exclusive rights to the technology were once held by Aladdin - all of which had been apparently arranged by Soichiro himself. Furthermore, he discovers patents for the first generation PETE-1 robot and its semi-perpetual Plasma Battery power source filed under his own name, as well as ones for PETE-2 filed by a Riko Sato.

After discovering an online video expose of the controversial Professor Toi claiming to have invented time travel, Soichiro and PETE-13 seek out the disgraced physicist. Toi expresses gratitude for the invention of the Plasma Battery that now powers his time machine, and eagerly sends Soichiro (and inadvertently, PETE-13) back to 1995 with a large quantity of gold.

With the help of patent attorney Taro Sato and his wife Midori, Soichiro files his patents for PETE-1 and the Plasma Battery, incorporates Aladdin Industries with Taro as CEO, initiates a probe into Mannix's finances, funds the younger Professor Toi's research using the gold, and offers encouragement to Gota as a child, while PETE-13 hijacks the FWE truck containing Soichiro's research. Soichiro also manages to recover Pete the cat and the FWE shares from Katsuhito's house, fakes Riko's apparent death, and arranges for the Satos to adopt and protect her from the machinations of her uncle Katsuhito, before finally making it to his original cold sleep appointment with Credeus.

Awakening once again in 2025, Soichiro is greeted by PETE-13, who spent the intervening years in sleep mode awaiting his return. From a letter written by Taro, he discovers that Riko became an accomplished robotics engineer in her own right, before also entering cold sleep to reunite with him. Finally realizing his own feelings for her, Soichiro rushes to Riko's bedside at the clinic, holding her hand as they and Pete the cat look out to a blue summer sky.

== Cast ==
Note: characters with counterparts from the original Heinlein novel are indicated with parentheses.

- Kento Yamazaki as Soichiro Takakura (Daniel Boone Davis), a robotics engineer, inventor and major shareholder at Future Works Enterprises (FWE).
- Kaya Kiyohara as Riko Matsushita (Frederica "Ricky" Virginia Gentry), a high school student and daughter of Soichiro's late guardian Dr. Matsushita.
- Naohito Fujiki as PETE-13, an advanced humanoid android from 2025 and a descendant of one of Soichiro's future inventions.
- Natsuna as Rin Shiraishi (Belle S. Darkin), secretary at FWE and Soichiro's fiancee.
- Hidekazu Mashima as Kazuhito Matsushita (Miles Gentry), Soichiro's business partner at FWE, as well as Riko's uncle.
- Kenta Hamano as Gota Tsuboi (Chuck Freudenberg), CEO of Guardian Manufacturing in 2025, inspired as a child by Soichiro's A-1 prototype robot.
- Tomorowo Taguchi as Professor Junnosuke Toi (Dr. Hubert Twitchell), a brilliant but disgraced physicist who eventually invents time travel in 2025.
- Taizo Harada as Taro Sato (John Sutton), an attorney who helps Soichiro patent his upcoming inventions.
- Rin Takanashi as Midori Sato (Jenny Sutton), Taro's paraplegic wife.
- Pasta and Bacon as Pete (Petronius the Arbiter), Soichiro's pet cat.

== Release ==
The Door into Summer was originally scheduled for a theatrical release on February 19, 2021, but was pushed back to June 25, 2021 due to the COVID-19 pandemic. It was released on Netflix on Jun 25, 2022.
