= Asuka Kudo =

Japanese actor (born 1991)

- 工藤 阿須加
- Born: 1 August 1991 (age 35); Saitama Prefecture, Japan
- Education: Tokyo Science Museum High School; Tokyo University of Agriculture
- Occupation: Actor
- Years active: 2012–present
- Agent: Papado
- Father: Kimiyasu Kudo

Asuka Kudo (工藤 阿須加, Kudō Asuka; born August 1, 1991 in Saitama Prefecture) is a Japanese actor. He graduated from Tokyo Gakkan High School and Tokyo University of Agriculture. He is represented by Papado.

== Biography ==
Kudo's father is professional baseball player and Fukuoka SoftBank Hawks coach Kimiyasu Kudo, and his sister is professional golfer Haruka Kudo. He is the first and eldest child of five siblings. Kudo had played tennis himself, but had no experience on professional baseball.

His acting debut was the Nippon TV drama Perfect Son in 2012. In 2013, he appeared in the NHK Taiga drama Yae's Sakura as Yamamoto Yaeko's younger brother Yamamoto Saburō, and later from July to September he appeared in the Fuji Television drama Shomuni 2013.

He later played pitcher Kazuya Okihara in the Tokyo Broadcasting System Nichiyō Gekijō series Roosevelt Game in 2014. Kudo was chosen from the audition from about a hundred applicants, and played as the same position as his father. Later in the 24 May between the Saitama Seibu Lions and the Tokyo Yakult Swallows in Seibu Prince Dome he wore the Seibu Lions uniform number 47, the same as his father's, and went to the ceremonial first pitch. Kudoh played a gay lover in the Nippon TV drama Fake Marriage.

== Awards ==
- 24th Japanese Movie Critics Awards Newcomer Award for Best Actor (Toshiko Minami Award) (1/11: Jūichibun no Ichi, Momose, Kocchi o Muite.)

== Filmography ==
=== TV drama ===
Year	Title	Role	Notes	Ref.
2013	Yae's Sakura	Yamamoto Saburō	Taiga drama	
2013	Shomuni 2013	Hayami		
2014	Roosevelt Game	Kazuya Okihara		
2014	Natsu no Owari ni, Koi o Shita.	Shunpei Kozuka		
2015	Risking It All: The Spirit of the Men in Orange	Takashi Yamakura		
2015	The Eternal Zero	Takanori Takeda		
2015	Fake Marriage	Tamotsu Deshimaru		
2016	Here Comes Asa!	Keisuke Higashiyanagi	Asadora	
2016	Your Home Is My Business!	Seiji Niwano		
2019	Natsuzora: Natsu's Sky	Nobuya Sasaoka	Asadora	
2019	Schöner, Ruhiger Garten	Ren Takana		
2021	The Grand Family	Yoshihiko Ichinose		
2021	Emergency Interrogation Room	Yoshiharu Yamagami	Season 4	
2022	Uzukawamura Jiken	Tatsuki	Miniseries	
2023	Burn the House Down	Kiichi Mitarai		
2024–27	Golden Kamuy: The Hunt of Prisoners in Hokkaido / Karafuto Pursuit Arc	Hajime Tsukishima	2 seasons	
2026	Blossom	Tatsuhiko Shimamura	Asadora	

=== Films ===
Year	Title	Role	Notes	Ref.
2012	Lesson of the Evil	Hiroshi Matsumoto		
2014	1/11: Jūichibun no Ichi	Kajiya Koshikawa		
2014	My Little Nightmare: The Movie			
2014	My Pretend Girlfriend	Shun Miyazaki		
2014	Close Range Love			
2015	Again	Haruhiko Sakamichi (28 years ago)		
2016	The Firefly Summers	Shingo		
2017	To Each His Own	Takashi Aoyama		
2017	A Loving Husband	Yohei (college years)		
2021	First Gentleman	Kozan Shimazaki		
2021	Shinonome-iro no Shūmatsu	Ryūnosuke Kamikawa		
2021	Sing a Bit of Harmony	Tōma (voice)		
2022	Anime Supremacy!	Shūhei Munemori		
2024	Golden Kamuy	Hajime Tsukishima		
2025	Climbing for Life	Masaaki Tabe (young)		
2025	Emergency Interrogation Room: The Final Movie	Yoshiharu Yamagami		
2026	Golden Kamuy: The Abashiri Prison Raid	Hajime Tsukishima		
2026	Love Me Kill Me	Akashi		
2026	First Voice	Takanori Komatsu		

=== Advertisements ===
Year	Title	Notes	Ref.
2014	Toshiba Tōshiba Nodamabu	As Kazuya Okihara (Note: Collaboration advertisement with the drama Roosevelt Game.)	
2014	Mitsubishi Estate		
2014	Kirin Beverage Fire Double Mountain		
2015	Sumitomo Dainippon Pharma		
