= Wotakoi: Love Is Hard for Otaku (film) =

- Film poster
- Kanji: ヲタクに恋は難しい
- Revised Hepburn: Wotaku ni Koi wa Muzukashii
- Directed by: Yūichi Fukuda
- Written by: Yūichi Fukuda
- Based on: Wotakoi: Love Is Hard for Otaku by Fujita
- Produced by: Hiroki Wakamatsu
- Starring: Mitsuki Takahata; Kento Yamazaki; Nanao; Takumi Saitoh
- Cinematography: Tetsuya Kudō; Yasuyuki Suzuki
- Edited by: Eri Usuki
- Music by: Shirō Sagisu; Eishi Segawa; Moe Hyūga; Mayuka Sakai
- Production companies: CREDEUS; Toho Pictures
- Distributed by: Toho
- Release date: February 7, 2020
- Running time: 122 minutes
- Country: Japan
- Language: Japanese
- Box office: $11.7 million

Wotakoi: Love Is Hard for Otaku (ヲタクに恋は難しい, Wotaku ni Koi wa Muzukashii) is a 2020 Japanese musical romantic comedy film based on the webmanga series of the same name, directed by Yuichi Fukuda and distributed by Toho. It stars Mitsuki Takahata as Narumi and Kento Yamazaki as Hirotaka. It was released in Japanese theaters on February 7, 2020.

== Plot ==
Narumi Momose is a female office worker who hides her fujoshi otaku lifestyle. At her new workplace she meets her old childhood friend Hirotaka, a handsome and capable company man who is a game otaku. The two seem perfect for each other, but love is difficult for otaku.

== Cast ==
- Mitsuki Takahata as Narumi Momose
- Kento Yamazaki as Hirotaka Nifuji
- Nanao as Hanako Koyanagi
- Takumi Saitoh as Taro Kabakura
- Kento Kaku as Shinji Sakamoto
- Tsuyoshi Muro as Bartender
- Jiro Sato as Kunio Ishiyama
- Yumi Wakatsuki as Miku
- Mio Imada as Yuki Morita
- Maaya Uchida as Herself

== Production ==
On July 26, 2018, a video promoting the sixth volume of the manga revealed that a live-action movie adaptation was in production.

On September 18, 2018, the lead actors were announced: Mitsuki Takahata and Kento Yamazaki to play Narumi and Hirotaka.

First filming began on October 3, 2018, at Sake Dojo Jinya Nakamoto store.

== Reception ==
Wotakoi: Love Is Hard for Otaku earned $11,702,371 at the box office.
