= Golden Kamuy (film) =

2024 film directed by Shigeaki Kubo

- Theatrical release poster.
- Directed by: Shigeaki Kubo
- Written by: Satoru Noda; Tsutomu Kuroiwa
- Based on: Golden Kamuy by Satoru Noda
- Produced by: Shinzo Matsuhashi; Ryo Otaki; Haruna Ueda; Ryosuke Mori; Yuya Satoyoshi
- Starring: Kento Yamazaki; Anna Yamada; Yūma Yamoto; Gordon Maeda; Hiroshi Tamaki; Hiroshi Tachi
- Narrated by: Kenjiro Tsuda
- Cinematography: Daisuke Souma
- Edited by: Tsuyoshi Wada
- Music by: Yutaka Yamada
- Production companies: WOWOW Films; Credeus; Shueisha
- Distributed by: Toho
- Release date: 19 January 2024
- Running time: 128 minutes
- Country: Japan
- Language: Japanese

Golden Kamuy (Japanese: ゴールデンカムイ, Hepburn: Gōruden Kamui) is a 2024 Japanese historical action movie directed by Shigeaki Kubo, based on the manga series of same name written and illustrated by Satoru Noda.

The movie stars Kento Yamazaki, Anna Yamada, Yūma Yamoto and Gordon Maeda, and it tells the story of Saichi Sugimoto, a veteran of the early twentieth-century Russo-Japanese War, and his quest to find a huge fortune of gold of the Ainu people, helped by a young Ainu girl named Asirpa. The movie received a sequel series Golden Kamuy: The Hunt of Prisoners in Hokkaido and a sequel film Golden Kamuy: The Abashiri Prison Raid.

== Plot ==
In the late Meiji period in Hokkaido, Japan, Saichi Sugimoto, a war hero known as Immortal Sugimoto from the Russo-Japanese War, embarks on a new life in Hokkaido. He learns about stolen gold once belonging to the Ainu people, taken by a man named Noppera-bo who massacred everyone so he could get all the gold to himself. Noppera-bo was then caught and thrown into Abashiri prison, but had already hidden the gold in a secure location in Hokkaido. He tattooed the location of the hidden gold on 24 different prisoners, each prisoner held a part of the map, necessary to uncover the treasure. After sometime, Noppera-bo staged a jail break and asked those he tattooed to find the gold in return of getting half of it. Upon verifying that the information is true, Saichi Sugimoto sets out to gather the whole piece together so he could use money from the gold to restore Umeko's eyesight, whose husband Toraji died in the Russo-Japanese War.

During a bear attack, Sugimoto is rescued by Asirpa, an Ainu girl seeking vengeance for her father's murder by Noppera-bo. Bound by different goals but a shared quest for justice, Sugimoto and Asirpa unite forces. As their journey unfolds, more individuals including soldiers from the Seventh Division, Hijikata and others join the pursuit of the elusive gold. The movie ends with Hijikata revealing that the worth of the gold is not 200 kan, but 20,000 kan which is enough to build a new nation, adding that Hokkaido will become a battle field for all those in search of the gold.

== Cast ==
- Kento Yamazaki as Saichi Sugimoto
- Anna Yamada as Asirpa
- Gordon Maeda as Hyakunosuke Ogata
- Yūma Yamoto as Yoshitake Shiraishi
- Asuka Kudo as Hajime Tsukishima
- Shuntarō Yanagi as Kōhei Nikaidō / Yōhei Nikaidō
- Yūki Izumisawa as Toraji
- Mitsuki Takahata as Umeko
- Ryohei Otani as Genjirō Tanigaki
- Makita Sports as Takechiyo Gotō
- Yuno Nagao as Osoma
- Debo Akibe as Asirpa's great uncle
- Hisako Ōkata as Huci
- Katsuya as Tatsuuma Ushiyama
- Katsumi Kiba as Shinpachi Nagakura
- Arata Iura as Aca
- Hiroshi Tamaki as Tokushirō Tsurumi
- Hiroshi Tachi as Toshizō Hijikata

== Production ==
Production began in early 2021 after Wowow and Credeus acquired the film rights, and the production lasted for three years. The idea of the movie was to respect the manga series and maintain the same story line, thus Shigeaki Kubo who is a fan of the original series was appointed to be the director. Satoru Noda, the author of the original series supervised the scripting process, so that it will not deviate from the original story.

== Release ==
The poster and trailer for the movie was released in October 2023, while the movie was released in Japanese theaters on 19 January 2024, and began streaming on Netflix on 19 May 2024, four months after its initial Japanese release.

== Reception ==
=== Box office ===
The film grossed over ¥500 million and attracted over 350,000 viewers in the first three days of its release, ranking number 1, and it attracted 1.75 million viewers and grossed ¥2.58 billion as of February 29.

=== Critical reception ===
James Hadfield of The Japan Times rated the movie 3 out of 5 stars, saying that "For all its extravagance, Golden Kamuy only leaves you half full."

Panos Kotzathanasis of Asian Movie Pulse noted in his review that Golden Kamuy is a film worth watching, but the flashbacks were not placed in ideal moments and the dramatic parts could have been handled in better fashion.
