= Nana Ozaki (actress) =

Japanese actress (born 1948)

Nana Ozaki (尾崎奈々, Ozaki Nana; born July 28, 1948) is a retired Japanese actress. She is from Toyonaka, Osaka Prefecture. Her real name is Toshiko Ishihara, or Toshiko Ozaki in her spinsterhood. In 1969, she won the Elan d'Or Prize. She was active in the various movies, i.e. Kaze no Bojo, and in 1973 she got married with the cinema director Shigeru Ishihara, so that she retired as an actress.
