= Mitsuki Takahata =

Japanese actress and singer (born 1991)

Mitsuki Takahata 高畑 充希
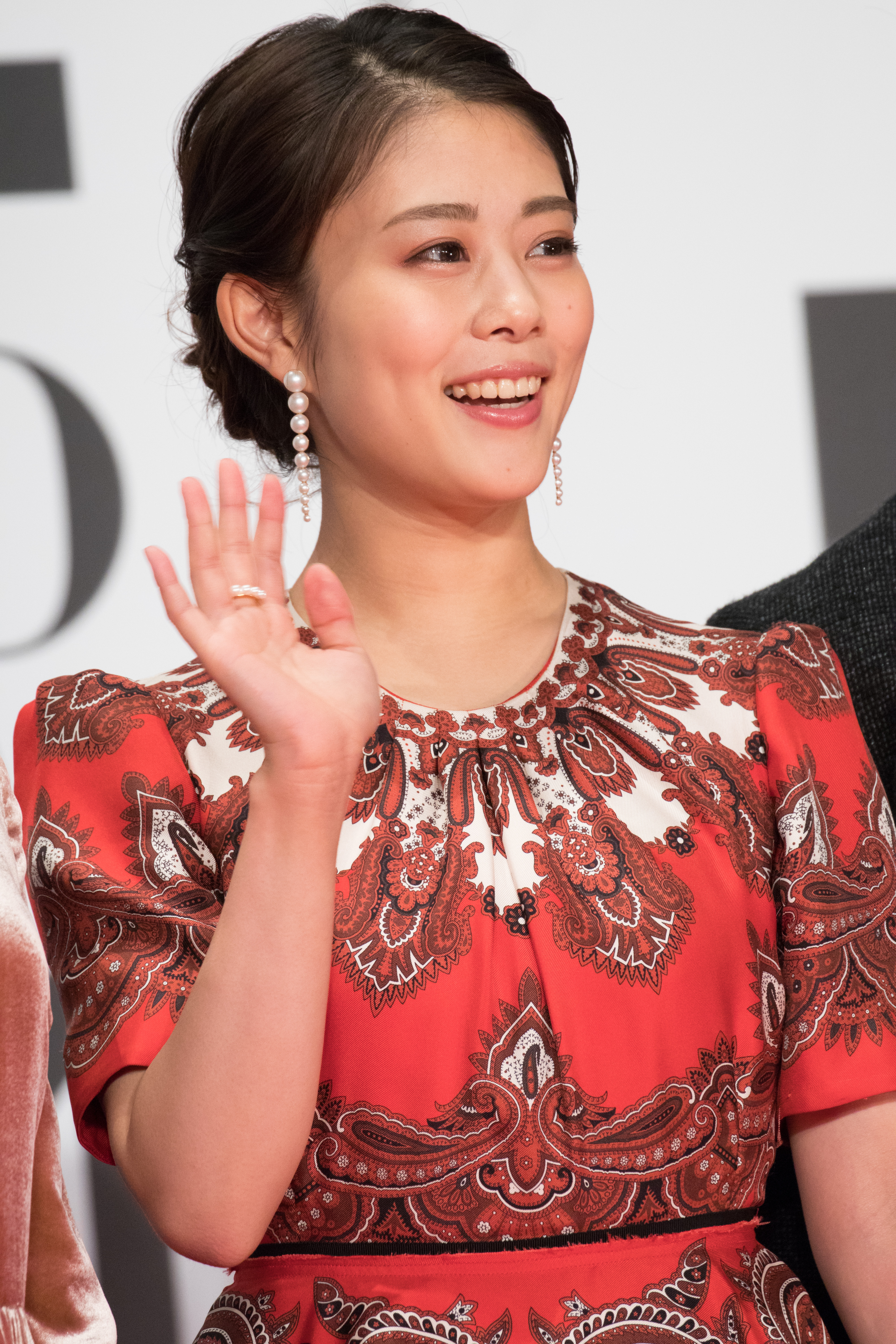
- Takahata at the Tokyo International Film Festival in 2016

Background information
- Also known as: Mitsuki
- Born: December 14, 1991 (age 34); Higashiōsaka, Osaka, Japan
- Occupations: Actress; singer
- Years active: 2005–present
- Website: Official profile

Mitsuki Takahata (高畑 充希, Takahata Mitsuki; born December 14, 1991) is a Japanese actress and singer who is represented by the talent agency Horipro. She attended Hosei University as an undergraduate student.

Her song "Hitomi Hiraite" is the Japanese theme song for Meet the Robinsons.

== Personal life ==
On November 19, 2024, Takahata was reported to be dating Masaki Okada and was planning for marriage in the near future.

== Filmography ==
=== TV series ===
Year	Title	Role	Notes	Ref.
2007	Kinpachi-sensei	Ayaka Taguchi		
2013	Gochisōsan	Noriko (Kawakubo) Nishikado	Asadora	
2014	Gunshi Kanbei	Ito	Taiga drama	
2016	Daddy Sister	Tsuneko Kohashi	Lead role; Asadora	
2016	Love That Makes You Cry	Kihoko Hinata		
2017	Overprotected Kahoko	Kahoko Nemoto	Lead role	
2018	Boukyaku no Sachiko	Sasaki Sachiko	Lead role	
2019	Our Dearest Sakura	Sakura Kitano	Lead role	
2019	Maison de Police	Hiyori Makino	Lead role	
2021	Nizi Village Clinic	Masora Kureno	Lead role	
2024	1122: For a Happy Marriage	Ichiko Aihara	Lead role	
2024	Dear Radiance	Fujiwara no Sadako	Taiga drama	

=== Film ===
Year	Title	Role	Notes	Ref.
2014	Jossy's	Yuri Kikawada		
2014	Blue Spring Ride	Yui Narumi		
2014	The Vancouver Asahi	Emmy Kasahara		
2016	Rage	Kaoru		
2016	Evergreen Love	Sayaka Kōno	Lead role	
2016	Japanese Girls Never Die	Aina Kinami		
2017	Napping Princess	Kokone Morikawa (voice)	Lead role	
2017	Destiny: The Tale of Kamakura	Ayako Isshiki	Lead role	
2018	The Travelling Cat Chronicles	Nana (voice)		
2018	A Banana? At This Time of Night?	Misaki Andō		
2019	Samurai Shifters	Oran		
2019	Almost a Miracle	Sakura Takashima		
2020	Wotakoi: Love Is Hard for Otaku	Narumi Momose	Lead role	
2021	The Cinematic Liars of Asahi-za	Riko Mogi	Lead role	
2021	Tomorrow's Dinner Table	Kana Ishihashi		
2021	Character	Natsumi Kawase		
2023	Monster	Hirona		
2024	Golden Kamuy	Umeko		
2025	Kokuho	Harue Fukuda		
2025	5 Centimeters per Second	Akari Shinohara		

=== Dubbing ===
Live-action

Year	Title	Role	Voice dub for	Ref.
2015	Cinderella	Ella	Lily James	
2023	Barbie	Barbie	Margot Robbie	
2025	Wicked	Elphaba	Cynthia Erivo	
2026	Wicked: For Good	Elphaba	Cynthia Erivo	

Animation

Year	Title	Role	Ref.
2007	Meet the Robinsons	Lizzy	

=== Theatre ===
Year	Title	Role	Notes	Ref.
2007–2012	Peter Pan	Peter Pan		
2009–2014	The Miracle Worker	Helen Keller		
2012	Alice in Wonderland	Chloe		
2013	Sweeney Todd: The Demon Barber of Fleet Street	Johanna Barker		
2018	The Little Mermaid	Ariel	Staged Concert	
2019–2022	The Miracle Worker	Annie Sullivan		
2020–2022	Miss Saigon	Kim	Shared with Natsumi Kon, Tomona Yabiku, and Sakurako Ohara	
2021–2025	Waitress	Jenna Hunterson		

== Awards and nominations ==
Year	Award	Category	Result	Ref.
2017	41st Elan d'or Awards	Newcomer of the Year	Won	
2017	40th Japan Academy Film Prize	Newcomer of the Year	Won	
2018	7th Tokyo Sports Film Award	Best Actress	Nominated	
2020	43rd Japan Academy Film Prize	Best Supporting Actress	Nominated	
2021	46th Hochi Film Awards	Best Supporting Actress	Nominated	
2026	49th Japan Academy Film Prize	Best Supporting Actress	Nominated	
