= Mackenyu =

Japanese actor (born 1996)

- 真剣佑
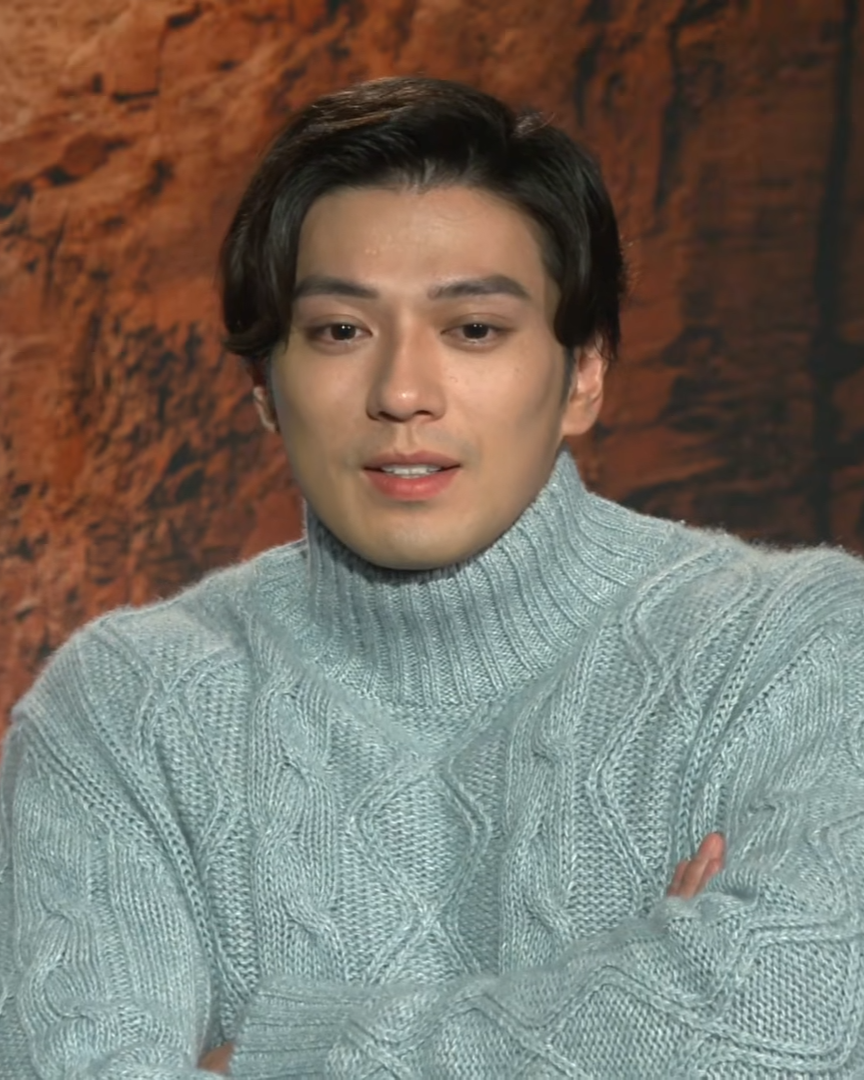
- Mackenyu in 2026
- Born: Mackenyu Maeda (前田 真剣佑); November 16, 1996 (age 29); Los Angeles, California, U.S.
- Other name: Mackenyu Arata
- Occupation: Actor
- Years active: 2015–present
- Agent: Asian Cinema Entertainment
- Spouse: Unknown (m. 2023)
- Children: 1
- Father: Sonny Chiba
- Relatives: Juri Manase (half-sister); Gordon Maeda (brother)
- Website: mackenfamily.jp

Mackenyu Maeda (前田 真剣佑, Maeda Makken'yū; born November 16, 1996), also known mononymously as Mackenyu (真剣佑, Makken'yū) is a Japanese actor. He previously used the stage name Mackenyu Arata (新田 真剣佑, Arata Makken'yū) in Japan.

He rose to fame after portraying Arata Wataya in the Chihayafuru live-action trilogy in 2016, which earned him the 40th Japan Academy Newcomers of the Year Award in 2017.

He has since portrayed characters in many other adaptations of popular manga series, including Okuyasu Nijimura in JoJo's Bizarre Adventure: Diamond Is Unbreakable Chapter I (2017), Sōta in Tokyo Ghoul S (2019), Yukishiro Enishi in Rurouni Kenshin: The Final (2021), Pegasus Seiya in Knights of the Zodiac, and Roronoa Zoro in the Netflix series One Piece (both 2023).

== Early life ==
Mackenyu Maeda was born on November 16, 1996, in Los Angeles. He is the son of Japanese parents, Tamami Chiba and Japanese action movie star Sonny Chiba (born Sadaho Maeda), and has two siblings, an older half-sister named Juri Manase (his father's daughter from a previous marriage) and a younger brother named Gordon. He attended Beverly Hills High School in their Advanced Placement Program and appeared in a few films and TV shows while growing up, including the TV mini-series Team Astro (Astro Kyūdan) (2005), and the Japanese feature film Oyaji (2007), as he devoted most of his time to school and graduation. As a young child, Mackenyu had many interests. He learned horseback riding and Yabusame at the age of 7. He practiced Kyokushin Karate since he was eight years old, and he was placed third at the US kyokushin Karate Nationals in middle school. In high school he did gymnastics, water polo, and wrestling, becoming the school representative for the latter. He was also into music, playing piano since he was 10 years old, and later participated in the brass band of his high school in Beverly Hills, playing saxophone, and flute.

At the age of 15, Mackenyu watched a Japanese movie and the actor who starred in it inspired him to pursue acting professionally in Japan. He held on to the dream of co-starring with the actor once he established his acting career in Japan. He later revealed that it was the late Haruma Miura after he co-starred with him in the movie adaptation of Gunjō Senki. Mackenyu landed his first feature film lead role in Take a Chance (2015) and was featured in an acclaimed short movie depicting a Japanese family suffering the aftermath of the World War II in Tadaima (2015) in which the movie won The Best Narrative Short in Philadelphia Asian American Film Festival. He moved to Japan later in the same year, stating that Japan would be the best place for him to learn due to the variety of roles that are available for young actors.

== Career ==
In 2013, Mackenyu turned his full attention to acting—including roles in the feature film Buzz (So-On: The Five Oyaji) (2014) and TV movie Yo nimo Kimyō na Monogatari (2014).

His acting quickly expanded to include three supporting roles in TV Mini-series including The Kindergarten Detective (Hanasaki Shin'ichirō wa Nemurenai!!) (2015), Yume o Ataeru (2015), and The Hatsumori Bemars (2015). His fame grew dramatically in Japan after landing the role of Eiji Tomari/Kamen Rider Dark Drive/Paradox Roidmude in Kamen Rider Drive: Surprise Future; the film Tie-in to the 2014–2015 Entry in the Kamen Rider franchise, Kamen Rider Drive, based on the popular series created by manga artist Shotaro Ishinomori In 2015, he also landed his first lead roles in two USA film productions, Take a Chance (2015) and Tadaima (2015); for the latter he won a best supporting actor award at the Asians of Films festival.

In January 2016, he made his stage debut in the Japanese musical Boys Over Flower (Hana Yori Dango: The Musical) (2016). He had a prominent role in the two part feature film Chihayafuru Part I & II (2016) which was released back-to-back in March and April 2016. Japan's AM magazine featured him on the front cover of their 14 March 2016 edition and included an interview with him. One of his most challenging roles in his career to date was Shōjo (Little Girl). Having completed his lead role as "Makise" in the feature film Night's Tightrope (Shōjo) (2016), Mackenyu started to expand his acting opportunities in Hollywood with a supporting role of Cadet Ryoichi in the science fiction film Pacific Rim: Uprising (2018). 2018 was a busy year with series Kiss That Kills and movies Chihayafuru Part III, manga-based Impossibility Defense and speed-drive action-drama Over Drive.

In 2019, he was cast as the final villain, Yukishiro Enishi, in the last two movies of the Rurouni Kenshin live-action adaptation.

In December 2020, Mackenyu announced that he would be leaving his agency, Top Coat, in April 2021 as well as suspending his Japanese activities for the time being. He announced that he wants to focus on global activities in 2021.

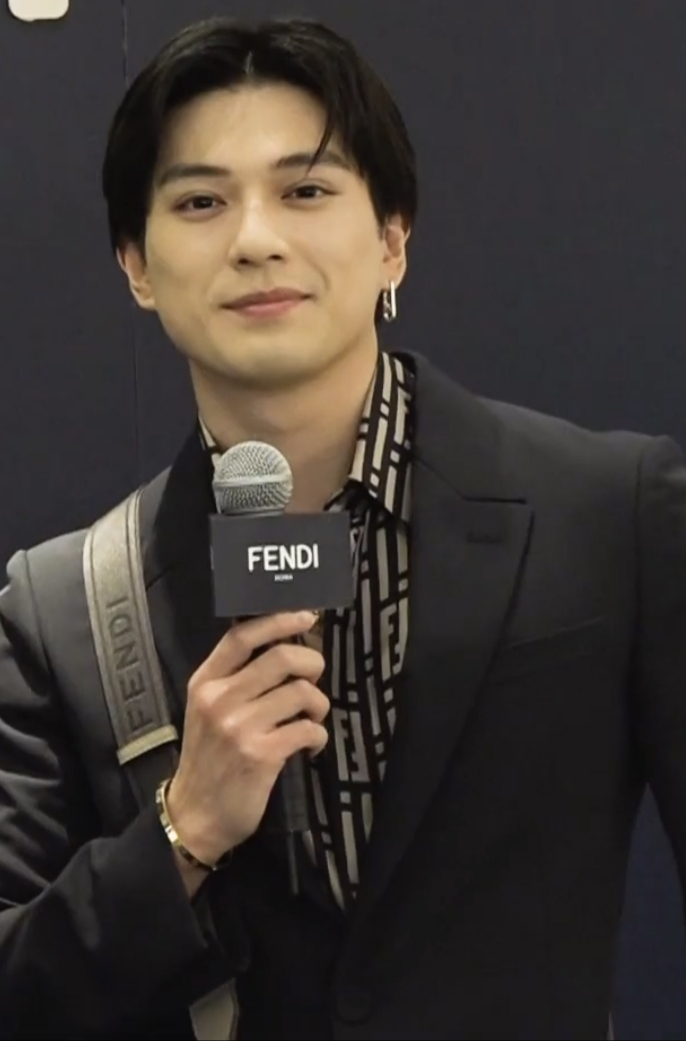
Mackenyu during a Fendi event in 2023

In 2021, he starred as the lead in the manga adaptation of Brave: Gunjou Senki. He is now in Asian Cinema Entertainment. In November 2021, Mackenyu was cast as Roronoa Zoro in the American Netflix live action series adaptation of One Piece.

In March 2022, he was cast as Scar in the live-action sequel of Fullmetal Alchemist.

On November 1, 2026, he announced that he had changed his stage name in Japan from Mackenyu Arata to his birth name, Mackenyu Maeda.

== Personal life ==
Mackenyu married a woman seven years his senior, whose name is not disclosed. The marriage was announced along with his younger brother's on January 22, 2023. In August of the same year, it was reported by media outlets that Mackenyu's wife had given birth to their first child in Honolulu, Hawaii, in late July 2023.

== Brand endorsements ==
In 2018, Mackenyu became the brand ambassador for Japanese men's grooming brand GATSBY. He starred in the TV commercial "GATSBY Cop", together with popular Japanese actor Yuya Yagira.

== Filmography ==
=== Film ===
Year	Title	Role	Notes	Ref(s)
2015	Tadaima	George		
2015	Kamen Rider Drive: Surprise Future	Eiji Tomari		
2015	Take a Chance	Masa	Lead role	
2016	Chihayafuru Part 1	Arata Wataya		
2016	Chihayafuru Part 2	Arata Wataya		
2016	Night's Tightrope	Hikaru Makise		
2016	Bittersweet	Atsushi Babazono		
2017	Let's Go, Jets!	Kōsuke Yamashita		
2017	JoJo's Bizarre Adventure: Diamond Is Unbreakable Chapter I	Okuyasu Nijimura		
2017	Peach Girl	Kazuya "Tōji" Tōjigamori		
2018	Pacific Rim: Uprising	Cadet Ryoichi		
2018	Chihayafuru Part 3	Arata Wataya		
2018	Over Drive	Naozumi Hiyama	Lead role	
2018	Impossibility Defense	Asao Momose		
2018	Code Blue: The Movie	Akio Kishida		
2019	12 Suicidal Teens	Shinjirō	Lead role	
2019	Tokyo Ghoul S	Sōta		
2019	NiNoKuni	Haru (voice)		
2020	Kaiji: Final Game	Minato Hirose		
2020	Our 30-Minute Sessions	Aki Miyata	Lead role	
2020	Tonkatsu DJ Agetarō	Guest of VIP room	Cameo	
2021	Brave: Gunjō Senki	Aoi Nishino	Lead role	
2021	The Master Plan	Makoto	Lead role	
2021	Rurouni Kenshin: The Final	Yukishiro Enishi		
2022	Fullmetal Alchemist: The Revenge of Scar	Scar		
2022	Fullmetal Alchemist: The Final Alchemy	Scar		
2023	Knights of the Zodiac	Pegasus Seiya	Lead role	
2027	Mashle	Mash Burnedead	Lead role	

=== Television ===
Year	Title	Role	Notes	Ref(s)
2015	Yume wo Ataeru	Masaaki	Miniseries	
2016	Sakurasaku	Ippei	Lead role; miniseries	
2016	Tomorrow, I'll Surely Love You Again	Shouta	Lead role; miniseries	
2016	Brass Dreams	Ren Kitora		
2017	Fugitive Boys	Ichihashi Tetsuto		
2018	Kiss that Kills	Takauji Namiki		
2019	Two Homelands	Yu Amada	Miniseries	
2019	Our Dearest Sakura	Aoi Kijima		
2020	Murdered Remotely	Nomura Yusaku	Lead role; television film	
2021	The End of the Tiny World: Half A Year Later	Makoto	Lead role	
2021	Ichikei's Crow: The Criminal Court Judges	Bunta Ishikura		
2023–present	One Piece	Roronoa Zoro		
2025	The 19th Medical Chart	Kojiro Togo		
2025	Chihayafuru: Full Circle	Arata Wataya		
2026	Lego One Piece	Roronoa Zoro (voice)		

=== Video games ===
Year	Title	Role	Notes	Ref(s)
2025	Assassin's Creed Shadows	Gennojo (voice)	Also likeness	

== Awards and nominations ==
Name of the award ceremony, year presented, nominee(s) of the award, award category, and the result of the nomination
Award ceremony	Year	Nominee/work	Category	Result	Ref(s)
Asians On Film Festival	2015	Tadaima	Best Supporting Actor	Won	
Hochi Film Award	2016	Chihayafuru	Best New Artist	Nominated	
Hochi Film Award	2018	Overdrive	Best Supporting Actor	Nominated	
Japan Academy Film Prize	2017	Chihayafuru	Newcomer of the Year	Won	
Mainichi Film Awards	2017	Chihayafuru	Best New Actor	Nominated	
