= Naohito Fujiki =

Japanese actor and singer

- 藤木 直人
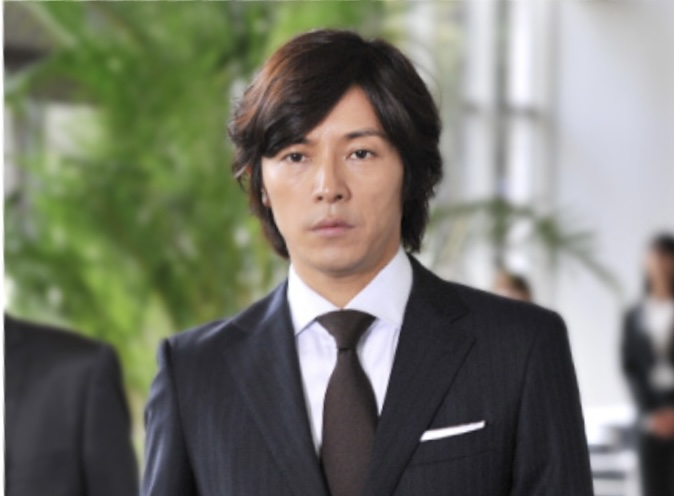
- Born: July 19, 1972 (age 54); Kurashiki, Okayama Prefecture, Japan
- Occupations: Actor, singer
- Years active: 1995–present
- Musical career
- Genres: J-pop, rock
- Label: CUBE

Naohito Fujiki (藤木 直人, Fujiki Naohito; born July 19, 1972) is a Japanese actor and singer.

== Filmography ==
=== Television ===
- Happy Mania (1998)
- Nanisama! (1998)
- Great Teacher Onizuka (1998)
  - GTO Revival (2024)
- Oni No Sumika (1999)
- P.S. Genki Desu, Shunpei (1999)
- Nurse No Oshigoto 3 (2000)
- Love Revolution (2001)
- Antique Bakery (2001)
- Hatsu Taiken (2002)
- Nurse No Oshigoto 4 (2002)
- Kōkō Kyōshi (2003)
- Itoshi Kimi e (2004)
- Slow Dance (2005)
- Hotaru no Hikari: It's Only A Little Light In My Life (2007)
- Taira no Kiyomori (2012), Saigyō
- Segodon (2018), Abe Masahiro
- Natsuzora: Natsu's Sky (2019), Takeo Shibata
- Our Sister's Soulmate (2020), Satoshi Takada
- Air Girl (2021), Jirō Shirasu
- Fixer (2023), Hiroki Nakano
- Antihero (2024), Isao Kurata
- Glass Heart (2025), Ichidai Isagi

=== Films ===
- Game (2003)
- The Door into Summer (2021), PETE-13
- Fullmetal Alchemist: The Revenge of Scar (2022), Yuriy Rockbe
- In the Clear Moonlit Dusk (2026), Seiichi Takiguchi
- To You in the Beyond (2026), Nishina (voice)

=== Japanese dub ===
- Coco (2017), Héctor

== Discography ==
=== Singles ===
1. [1999.07.07] 世界の果て ～the end of the world～
2. [1999.11.17] 虹 ～waiting for the rainbow～
3. [2000.07.19] パーフェクトワールド (Perfect World)
4. [2000.11.01] コズミックライダー (Cosmic Rider)
5. [2001.04.18] 2 HEARTS
6. [2001.08.01] anon
7. [2001.11.21] パズル (Puzzle)
8. [2002.02.20] Wonderful Days
9. [2002.09.04] So Long... / 涙のいろ
10. [2003.02.19] 天使ノ虹
11. [2003.11.19] Flower
12. [2004.12.01] シュクメイ (Shukumei)
13. [2006.05.17] HEY! FRIENDS
14. [2007.10.10] Tuning Note
15. [2009.05.13] CRIME OF LOVE / いいんだぜ～君がいてくれれば～

=== Albums ===
1. [2000.12.06] Bump!
2. [2002.03.20] Warp
3. [2003.03.05] 03
4. [2004.12.08] Colorman
5. [2006.07.19] Life Goes On!
6. [2007.10.24] Reverse
7. [2009.06.10] ∞ Octave
8. [2009.07.15] History of Naohito Fujiki 10th Anniversary Box

=== Mini Album ===
1. [2004.07.28] 夏歌ウ者ハ冬泣ク

=== DVD ===
1. [2001.01.10] nao-hit TV ver1.0
2. [2001.11.21] 別冊 nao-hit TV ～2001 limited～
3. [2002.09.04] NAO-HIT TV LIVE TOUR ver4.0 ～吉他小子的動作喜劇電影和演唱曾～
4. [2002.12.18] NAO-HIT TV Live Tour ver.4.0 Complete Box
5. [2003.11.19] NAO-HIT TV LIVE TOUR ver 5.0 ～今年こそっ!?大漁でSHOW!!～
6. [2003.12.17] NAO-HIT TV MAKING OF LIVE TOUR ver5.0 今年こそっ!? 大漁でSHOW!!
7. [2004.12.15] 夏歌冬泣 ～NAO-HIT TV LIVE TOUR ver 5.1～
8. [2005.03.16] まっしろいカンバス ～NAO-HIT TV LIVE TOUR ver 6.0～」
9. [2005.05.18] まっしろいカンバスSE～NAO-HIT TV LIVE TOUR ver 6.0 Special Edition～
10. [2006.03.08] F△7-VISUAL COLLECTION-
11. [2007.01.17] NAO-HIT TV Live Tour ver7.0～KNOCKIN' ON SEVENTH DOOR～FINAL IN 日本武道館
12. [2008.03.05] NAO-HIT TV Live Tour ver8.0 ～LIVE US! TOUR～ 2007.12.6 日本武道館

=== VHS ===
1. [2001.01.10] nao-hit TV ver1.0
2. [2001.11.21] 別冊 nao-hit TV ～2001 limited～
3. [2002.09.04] NAO-HIT TV LIVE TOUR ver4.0 ～吉他小子的動作喜劇電影和演唱曾～
4. [2002.12.18] NAO-HIT TV Live Tour ver.4.0 Complete Box
5. [2003.11.19] NAO-HIT TV LIVE TOUR ver 5.0 ～今年こそっ!?大漁でSHOW!!～
6. [2003.12.17] NAO-HIT TV MAKING OF LIVE TOUR ver5.0 今年こそっ!? 大漁でSHOW!!

== Awards and nominations ==
Year	Award	Category	Work(s)	Result	Ref.
2002	36th Elan d'or Awards	Newcomer of the Year	Himself	Won	
2004	27th Japan Academy Film Prize	Newcomer of the Year	Game	Won	
