= 43rd Japan Academy Film Prize =

Japanese film awards in 2020

- Date: March 6, 2020
- Site: Grand Prince Hotel New Takanawa, Tokyo, Japan
- Hosted by: Shinichi Hatori; Sakura Ando

Highlights
- Most awards: Kingdom (5)
- Most nominations: Fly Me to the Saitama (12)

The 43rd Japan Academy Film Prize (第43回日本アカデミー賞) is the 43rd edition of the Japan Academy Film Prize, an award presented by the Nippon Academy-Sho Association to award excellence in filmmaking.

== Winners & Nominees ==
=== Awards ===
Picture of the Year	Animation of the Year
The Journalist; Kingdom; Fly Me to the Saitama; Family of Strangers; Listen to the Universe	Weathering with You; Her Blue Sky; Detective Conan: The Fist of Blue Sapphire; Lupin III: The First; One Piece: Stampede
Director of the Year	Screenplay of the Year
Hideki Takeuchi – Fly Me to the Saitama; Shinsuke Sato – Kingdom; Masayuki Suo – Talking the Pictures; Hideyuki Hirayama – Family of Strangers; Michihito Fujii – The Journalist	Yūichi Tokunaga – Fly Me to the Saitama; Shōzō Katashima – Talking the Pictures; Roba Shimori, Akihiko Takaishi and Michihito Fujii – The Journalist; Hideyuki Hirayama – Family of Strangers; Kōki Mitani – Hit Me Anyone One More Time
Outstanding Performance by an Actor in a Leading Role	Outstanding Performance by an Actress in a Leading Role
Tori Matsuzaka – The Journalist; Shōfukutei Tsurube II – Family of Strangers; Masaki Suda – The Great War of Archimedes; Kiichi Nakai – Hit Me Anyone One More Time; Gackt – Fly Me to the Saitama	Shim Eun-kyung – The Journalist; Fumi Nikaidō – Fly Me to the Saitama; Mayu Matsuoka – Listen to the Universe; Rie Miyazawa – No Longer Human; Sayuri Yoshinaga – The Bucket List
Outstanding Performance by an Actor in a Supporting Role	Outstanding Performance by an Actress in a Supporting Role
Ryo Yoshizawa – Kingdom; Gō Ayano – Family of Strangers; Yūsuke Iseya – Fly Me to the Saitama; Tasuku Emoto – The Great War of Archimedes; Takashi Okamura – The 47 Ronin in Debt; Kuranosuke Sasaki – Aircraft Carrier Ibuki	Masami Nagasawa – Kingdom; Yūki Amami – The Bucket List; Nana Komatsu – Family of Strangers; Mitsuki Takahata – A Banana? At This Time of Night?; Fumi Nikaidō – No Longer Human
Outstanding Achievement in Music	Outstanding Achievement in Cinematography
Radwimps – Weathering with You; Yoshikazu Suo – Talking the Pictures; Dai Fujikura and Daisuke Shinoda – Listen to the Universe; Yutaka Yamada – Kingdom; Face 2 fAKE – Fly Me to the Saitama	Tarō Kawazu – Kingdom; Kōzō Shibazaki – Family of Strangers; Sōhei Tanikawa – Fly Me to the Saitama; Piotr Niemyjski – Listen to the Universe; Jun'ichi Fujisawa – Talking the Pictures
Outstanding Achievement in Lighting Direction	Outstanding Achievement in Art Direction
N/A – Kingdom; Nariyuki Ueda – Family of Strangers; Shunri Rinoie – Fly Me to the Saitama; Kenjirō Sō – Listen to the Universe; Tatsuya Osada – Talking the Pictures	Iwao Saitō – Kingdom; Yōji Abeki – Fly Me to the Saitama; Norihiro Isoda – Talking the Pictures; Anri Jōjō – The Great War of Archimedes; Katsumi Nakazawa – Family of Strangers
Outstanding Achievement in Sound Recording	Outstanding Achievement in Film Editing
Yoshifumi Kureishi – Listen to the Universe; Kazuhiro Katō – Fly Me to the Saitama; Michihiro Kōri – Talking the Pictures; Masato Komatsu – Family of Strangers; Kazushiko Yokono – Kingdom	Shinji Kawamura – Fly Me to the Saitama; Tsuyoshi Imai – Kingdom; Chieko Suzaki – Family of Strangers; Tatsuma Furukawa – The Journalist; Ryūji Miyajima – The Great War of Archimedes
Outstanding Foreign Language Film	Newcomer of the Year
Joker; Yesterday; Green Book; The Mule; Once Upon a Time in Hollywood	Yukino Kishii – Just Only Love; Yuina Kuroshima – Talking the Pictures; Riho Yoshioka – The Witness and Parallel World Love Story; Ouji Suzuka – Listen to the Universe; Win Morisaki – Listen to the Universe; Ryusei Yokohama – Aiuta: My Promise to Nakuhito, Cheer Boys!! and Go Away, Ultramarine
