= 48th Japan Academy Film Prize =

Japanese film awards in 2025

- Date: March 14, 2025
- Site: Grand Prince Hotel Shin Takanawa, Tokyo, Japan
- Hosted by: Shinichi Hatori; Sakura Ando

Highlights
- Most awards: Kingdom 4: Return of the Great General (4)
- Most nominations: Faceless (13)

The 48th Japan Academy Film Prize (第48回日本アカデミー賞) is the 48th edition of the Japan Academy Film Prize, an award presented by the Nippon Academy-Sho Association to award excellence in filmmaking. It took place at the Grand Prince Hotel Shin Takanawa in Tokyo on March 14, 2025, with free announcer Shinichi Hatori and actress Sakura Ando hosting the show.

The nominations were announced on January 21, 2025.

== Winners and nominees ==
=== Awards ===
Best Film	Best Animation Film
A Samurai in Time; Kingdom 4: Return of the Great General; Faceless; All the Long Nights; Last Mile	Look Back; Give It All; Mobile Suit Gundam SEED Freedom; Haikyu!! The Dumpster Battle; Detective Conan: The Million-dollar Pentagram
Best Director	Best Screenplay
Michihito Fujii – Faceless; Shinsuke Sato – Kingdom 4: Return of the Great General; Ayuko Tsukahara – Last Mile; Sho Miyake – All the Long Nights; Jun'ichi Yasuda – A Samurai in Time	Akiko Nogi – Last Mile; Yu Irie – A Girl Named Ann; Satomi Oshima – 90 Years Old – So What?; Kazuhisa Kodera and Michihito Fujii – Faceless; Akiko Nogi – Let's Go Karaoke!; Jun'ichi Yasuda – A Samurai in Time
Best Actor	Best Actress
Ryusei Yokohama – Faceless; Go Ayano – Let's Go Karaoke!; Tsuyoshi Kusanagi – Bushido; Makiya Yamaguchi – A Samurai in Time; Kento Yamazaki – Kingdom 4: Return of the Great General	Yuumi Kawai – A Girl Named Ann; Satomi Ishihara – Missing; Mone Kamishiraishi – All the Long Nights; Mitsuko Kusabue – 90 Years Old – So What?; Hikari Mitsushima – Last Mile
Best Supporting Actor	Best Supporting Actress
Takao Osawa – Kingdom 4: Return of the Great General; Seiyō Uchino – Hakkenden: Fiction and Reality; Masaki Okada – Last Mile; Jiro Sato – A Girl Named Ann; Takayuki Yamada – Faceless	Riho Yoshioka – Faceless; Mana Ashida – Cells at Work!; Kaya Kiyohara – Bushido; Tao Tsuchiya – Hakkenden: Fiction and Reality; Anna Yamada – Faceless
Best Music	Best Cinematography
Hiroko Sebu – Let's Go Karaoke!; Takashi Ohmama – Faceless; Masahiro Tokuda – Last Mile; Yutaka Yamada – Kingdom 4: Return of the Great General; Face 2 fAKE – Cells at Work!	Akira Sako – Kingdom 4: Return of the Great General; Tomoyuki Kawakami – Faceless; Takeshi Seki – Last Mile; Daisuke Soma – Golden Kamuy; Jun'ichi Yasuda – A Samurai in Time
Best Lighting Direction	Best Art Direction
Hiroyuki Kase – Kingdom 4: Return of the Great General; Koshiro Ueno – Faceless; Kazuyuki Kawasato – Last Mile; Kota Sato – Golden Kamuy; Kin'ya Doi, Hiroshi Hano and Jun'ichi Yasuda – A Samurai in Time	Masumi Miura – Cells at Work!; Toshihiro Isomi and Emiko Tsuyuki – Golden Kamuy; Masazumi Okihara – 11 Rebels; Hidetaka Ozawa – Kingdom 4: Return of the Great General; Shintaro Matsumoto – Faceless
Best Sound Recording	Best Film Editing
Kazushiko Yokono – Kingdom 4: Return of the Great General; Tomoharu Urata – 11 Rebels; Takashi Kanasugi – Cells at Work!; Hiroyuki Saijo – Last Mile; Toru Yonezawa and Yosuke Hamada – Faceless	Jun'ichi Yasuda – A Samurai in Time; Hiroaki Itabe – Last Mile; Tsuyoshi Imai – Kingdom 4: Return of the Great General; Tatsuma Furukawa – Faceless; Hiroshi Matsuo – Cells at Work!
Best Foreign Language Film	Newcomer of the Year
Oppenheimer; Poor Things; The Zone of Interest; Civil War; Laapataa Ladies	Asuka Saitō – Oshi no Ko: The Final Act; Nagisa Shibuya – Sana: Let Me Hear; Anna Yamada – Faceless and Golden Kamuy; Eiji Akaso – What If Shogun Ieyasu Tokugawa Was to Become the Prime Minister and 6 Lying University Students; Rihito Itagaki – Hakkenden: Fiction and Reality, Cells at Work! and The Yin Yang Master Zero; Keitatsu Koshiyama – My Sunshine; Jun Saito – Let's Go Karaoke!; Shintaro Morimoto – Faceless
Special Award of Honour from the Association	Award for Distinguished Service from the Chairman
Toshiyuki Nishida	Sō Kuramoto; Daisaku Kimura; Kōtarō Satomi; Misako Watanabe
Special Award from the Association	Special Award from the Chairman
Hiroshi Ichimaru; Tsutomu Kawahigashi; Tatsuo Momose; Kensei Mori	Noriko Ohara; Nobuyo Ōyama
