= Kingdom 2: Far and Away =

2022 film by Shinsuke Sato

- Theatrical release poster
- Japanese: キングダム2遥かなる大地へ
- Directed by: Shinsuke Sato
- Screenplay by: Tsutomu Kuroiwa; Yasuhisa Hara
- Based on: Kingdom by Yasuhisa Hara
- Produced by: Naoaki Kitajima; Shinzou Matsuhashi; Ryousuke Mori; Yuuya Satoyoshi; Gao Xiulan
- Starring: Kento Yamazaki; Ryo Yoshizawa; Kanna Hashimoto; Nana Seino; Etsushi Toyokawa; Takao Osawa
- Narrated by: Kouichi Yoshinaga
- Cinematography: Akira Sako
- Edited by: Tsuyoshi Imai
- Music by: Yutaka Yamada
- Production company: Credeus
- Distributed by: Toho; Sony Pictures Entertainment
- Release date: July 15, 2022 (Japan)
- Running time: 134 minutes
- Country: Japan
- Language: Japanese
- Box office: ¥5.16 billion

Kingdom 2: Far and Away (Japanese: キングダム2 遥かなる大地へ, Hepburn: Kingudamu Tsū Harukanaru Daichi e) is a 2022 Japanese historical war film directed by Shinsuke Sato. An adaptation of the manga of the same name by Yasuhisa Hara, the film is the sequel to Kingdom (2019). The film stars Kento Yamazaki, Ryo Yoshizawa, and Kanna Hashimoto.

By the end of 2022, Kingdom 2 had earned ¥5.16 billion (equivalent to US$32,593,042), making it the highest-grossing Japanese live-action film of that year. Three sequels have been released: Kingdom 3: The Flame of Destiny (2023), Kingdom 4: Return of the Great General (2024), and Kingdom 5: The Clash of Souls (2026).

== Plot ==
Kingdom 2: Far and Away is the sequel to Kingdom (2019), based on the manga series set during China's Warring States period. The story begins six months after Qin recaptures its capital. King Ying Zheng survives an assassination attempt with Xin's help, but Qin is soon attacked by Wei's army, led by Wu Qing, one of the Seven Fire Dragons of Wei.

General Biao Gong leads Qin's counterattack on the Hegan Plains, with Xin and Qiang Lei joining the battle. Supported by Commander Fu Hushen, they defeat Wei's Vice-General Gong Yuan. Wang Qi, one of Qin's Six Great Generals, mentors Xin, while Biao Gong defeats Wu Qing, forcing Wei to retreat.

Following the battle, Qiang Lei departs to avenge her sister. It is revealed that the assassination attempt was orchestrated by Qin's chancellor, Lu Buwei. The film concludes with Xin continuing his training under Wang Qi and being promoted to centurion.

== Cast ==
- Kento Yamazaki as Shin (Xin)
- Ryo Yoshizawa as Eisei (Ying Zheng)
- Kanna Hashimoto as Ka Ryo Ten (He Liao Diao)
- Nana Seino as Kyou Kai (Qiang Lei)
- Etsushi Toyokawa as Hyou Kou (Biao Gong)
- Amane Okayama as Bi Hei (Wei Ping)
- Takahiro Miura as Bi Toh (Wei Dao)
- Jun Kaname as Toh (Teng)
- Masahiro Takashima as Shou Bun Kun (Lord Changwen)
- Shinnosuke Mitsushima as Heki (Bi)
- Masaya Kato as Shi Shi (Si Shi)
- Togi Makabe as Hai Rou (Pei Lang)
- Ryusuke Taguchi as Kou Ri Gen (Huang Li Xian)
- Miou Tanaka as En (Yuan)
- Takayuki Hamatsu as Taku Kei (Ze Gui)
- Chihiro Yamamoto as Kyou Shou (Qiang Xiang)
- Kiyohiko Shibukawa as Baku Koshin (Fu Hushen)
- Tsutomu Takahashi as Kyu Gen (Gong Yuan)
- Yukiyoshi Ozawa as Go Kei (Wu Qing)
- Yūsuke Hirayama as Mou Bu (Meng Wu)
- Hiroshi Tamaki as Shou Hei Kun (Lord Changping)
- Kōichi Satō as Ryo Fui (Lü Buwei)
- Takao Osawa as Ou Ki (Wang Qi)

== Music ==
The score for Kingdom 2: Far and Away was once again composed by Yutaka Yamada, and its theme song is "Ikiro" by Mr. Children.

== Awards and nominations ==
| Award | Category | Nominee | Result | Ref. |
|---|---|---|---|---|
| 35th Nikkan Sports Film Awards | Yūjirō Ishihara Award | Kingdom 2: Far and Away | Won | |
| 35th Nikkan Sports Film Awards | Best Supporting Actress | Nana Seino | Won | |
| 65th Blue Ribbon Awards | Best Supporting Actress | Nana Seino | Won | |
| 46th Japan Academy Film Prize | Best Supporting Actress | Nana Seino | Nominated | |
| 46th Japan Academy Film Prize | Best Cinematography | Akira Sakō | Nominated | |
| 46th Japan Academy Film Prize | Best Lighting Direction | Hiroyuki Kase | Nominated | |
| 46th Japan Academy Film Prize | Best Art Direction | Hidetaka Ozawa | Nominated | |
| 46th Japan Academy Film Prize | Best Sound Recording | Akira Sakō | Nominated | |
