= Mitsushima (surname) =

Mitsushima (written: 満島) is a Japanese surname. Notable people with the surname include:

- Hikari Mitsushima (満島 ひかり; born 1985), Japanese actress, singer, model
- Shinnosuke Mitsushima (満島 真之介; born 1989), Japanese actor
