= Miou Tanaka =

Japanese actor (born 1974)

- 田中 美央
- Born: July 4, 1974 (age 52); Hyōgo, Japan
- Occupations: Actor, voice actor
- Years active: 1998–present

Miou Tanaka (田中 美央, Tanaka Miō; born July 4, 1974) is a Japanese actor and voice actor who is best known for appearing in visual media such as the Kingdom series (2019–), Godzilla Minus One (2023), and Pragmata (2026).

== Filmography ==
=== Stage ===
- Golden Twilight (1998)
- Robot (1999)

=== Film ===
- Ino Tadataka: Meridian Dreams (2001)
- Living Will (2001)
- The Emperor in August (2015), Kokatsu Arao
- Fueled: The Man They Called Pirate (2016)
- Sekigahara (2017), Saizo Kani
- Killing for the Prosecution (2018), Takaaki Koike
- Hell Dogs (2022), Kazufusa Tawaraya
- Kingdom 2: Far and Away (2022), Yuan
- Kingdom 3: The Flame of Destiny (2023), Yuan
- Godzilla Minus One (2023), Tatsuo Hotta
- Ultraman Blazar The Movie (2024)
- Kingdom 4: Return of the Great General (2024), Yuan
- Demon City (2025), Homare Takemoto
- Yukikaze (2025), Kōsaku Aruga
- Mission: Sorta Possible (2025)
- Kingdom 5: The Clash of Souls (2026), Yuan
- Godzilla Minus Zero (2026), Tatsuo Hotta
- Never Guilty (2026)

=== Television drama ===
- Naotora: The Lady Warlord (2017), Okuyama "Rokuza" Rokuzaemon
- Scarlet (2019), Hideki Sumita
- Idaten (2019), Tadaoki Yamamoto
- Reach Beyond the Blue Sky (2021), Tanuma Okitaka
- What Will You Do, Ieyasu? (2023), Okabe Motonobu
- The Tiger and Her Wings (2024), Tadayoshi Ichiyanagi
- Unbound (2025), Hajikano Nobuaki
- Brothers in Arms (2026), Bessho Yoshichika

=== Animated films ===
- Mobile Suit Gundam SEED Freedom (2024), Kojiro Murdoch replacing the late Toshihiko Nakajima
- Kusunoki no Bannin (2026), Katsushige Yanagisawa

=== Television animation ===
- Kingdom (2020–21), Han Ming
- Megalobox (2021), Ignacio "Chief" Martinez
- The Heike Story (2021), Kumagai Naozane
- Kaiju No. 8 (2024), Juzo Nogizaka
- Clevatess (2025), Margo

=== Original video animation ===
- Mobile Suit Gundam: The Origin VI - Rise of the Red Comet (2018), Ryu José

=== Video games ===
- Yakuza: Like a Dragon (2020), Yōsuke Tendō
- Like a Dragon Gaiden: The Man Who Erased His Name (2023), Yōsuke Tendō
- Like a Dragon: Pirate Yakuza in Hawaii (2025), Raymond Law
- Ghost of Yōtei (2025), Lord Saitō
- Pragmata (2026), Hugh Williams

=== Japanese dub ===
==== Live-action ====
- Benedict Wong
  - Doctor Strange, Wong
  - Avengers: Infinity War, Wong
  - Avengers: Endgame, Wong
  - Shang-Chi and the Legend of the Ten Rings, Wong
  - Spider-Man: No Way Home, Wong
  - She-Hulk: Attorney at Law, Wong
  - Doctor Strange in the Multiverse of Madness, Wong
- Alice Through the Looking Glass, King Oleron (Richard Armitage)
- Crime 101, Det. Tillman (Corey Hawkins)
- Disclosure Day, Hugo Wakefield (Colman Domingo)
- Godzilla x Kong: The New Empire, Harris (Ron Smyck)
- Jurassic World (2025 The Cinema edition), Vic Hoskins (Vincent D'Onofrio)
- The Last Adventure (2025 BS10 Star Channel edition), Roland Darbant (Lino Ventura)
- The Man with the Iron Fists, Brass Body (Dave Bautista)
- Twisters, Dexter (Tunde Adebimpe)

==== Animation ====
- Rapunzel's Tangled Adventure, Lance Strongbow
- The Wild Robot, Thorn
