= Kingdom 3: The Flame of Destiny =

2023 film by Shinsuke Sato

- Theatrical release poster
- Kanji: キングダム
- Revised Hepburn: Kingudamu
- Directed by: Shinsuke Sato
- Based on: Kingdom by Yasuhisa Hara
- Produced by: Kouji Hirano; Shirley Kao; Naoaki Kitajima; Shinzou Matsuhashi; Ryousuke Mori
- Starring: Kento Yamazaki; Ryo Yoshizawa; Kanna Hashimoto; Nana Seino; Anne Watanabe; Kataoka Ainosuke VI; Takao Osawa
- Narrated by: Kouichi Yoshinaga
- Cinematography: Tooru Kawazu
- Edited by: Tsuyoshi Imai
- Music by: Yutaka Yamada
- Production companies: Columbia Pictures; Sony Pictures Entertainment Japan; Credeus
- Distributed by: Toho
- Release date: July 28, 2023
- Running time: 130 minutes
- Country: Japan
- Language: Japanese
- Box office: ¥5.6 billion (Japan); $33.55 million (worldwide)

Kingdom 3: The Flame of Destiny (キングダム 運命の炎, Kingudamu Unmei no Hono) is a 2023 Japanese historical war film directed by Shinsuke Sato, based on Yasuhisa Hara's manga series Kingdom. It is a sequel to Kingdom (2019) and Kingdom 2: Far and Away (2022). The film stars Kento Yamazaki, Ryo Yoshizawa, Kanna Hashimoto, Takao Osawa, and Masami Nagasawa as returning cast for the film.

A sequel, Kingdom 4: Return of the Great General, was released on July 12, 2024. Another sequel, Kingdom 5: The Clash of Souls (キングダム 魂の決戦, Kingudamu Tamashii no Kessen), was released in Japan on July 17, 2026.

== Plot ==
The film begins 6 months after the events of the previous movie where the Wei army had marched into the state of Qin. The king of Qin hears news of Li Xin (Shin) being found in the lawless lands where he was training under General Ou Ki (Wang Qi) to become a 100-Man Commander. A voiceover tells of Shin's success, having first backed the weakest tribe of the lawless lands.

The Zhao army begins to invade at this time where they enact a massacre of the castle and its citizens as vengeance for a slaughter of 400,000 Qin had inflicted upon Zhao 16 years ago.

The first half of the movie follows a format where Ying Zheng explains to General Ou Ki the reason for his desire to unify China. This part of the story showcases how Ying Zheng made his decisions in the first movie. General Ou Ki decides to become Commander-in-Chief of the Qin army.

The next half of the movie, showcases the large scale battle between Qin and Zhao.

Meanwhile, General Ou Ki tasks Shin and his new 100-man unit with the task of sneaking into the left side battlefield to take down the commanding general, Fuki, of that side. He explains that as the battle wears on, competent military strategists like Fuki will become more and more crucial to the outcome. Shin accept. As a reward for accepting the task of this assassination attempt, Ouki provides the name of Hi Shin Unit to the unit under Shin.

On the battlefield, General Fuki orders a Zhao retreat, luring the 'winning' Qin left army in. He then outflanks them from both sides with Zhao forces, decimating half of them with arrows.

The Hi Shin unit is initially filled with apprehension, but with Shin's motivation and leadership, they attempt to scale a steep cliff leading up to Fuki's encampment. Diving their motives, Fuki sends men to greet them at the top, where they send one of Shin's men plunging to his death. In an act of sacrifice, Yugi, one of Shin's men, suggest they split, with the majority of them directing Fuki's men while Shin leads a smaller group up a separate route. Through this action, Shin, Kyokai (Qiang Lei) from the previous movie, and the rest of the unit are able to break through to the enemy headquarters.

Fuki orders Zhao's central army forward to finish off Qin's left army right before he realizes how close Shin and his men are. He realises that he was tricked by Ou Ki into moving both wings of his army against Qin's left, leaving himself greatly unguarded. He orders Zhao's retreat, but too late. Shin kills him with a jump cut through his neck. The remnants of Qin's left army arrives to reinforce the Hi Shin Unit.

After the Zhao army retreats into the nearby mountain range. Ou Ki opines that they retreated too easily, and deduces that there must be a mystery commander calling the shots. He makes all commanders under his command promise that none of them will go further than where they can see Zhao's former mountaintop headquarters.

The Hi Shin unit lost 31 men. General Ou Ki tells them that because of their deed, their unit will become known across all of China. As they celebrate over a campfire that night, a mystery figure in carrying a scythe approaches and begins killing the men.

Back at the Qin palace, it is learned that there is a hidden Zhao commander who goes by the name of Hou Ken (Pang Nuan) and is the one who killed Great General Kyo (Liao), a fellow commander alongside Shou Bun Kun and Ou Ki. This is presumably the attacker who approached the camp of the Hi Shin Unit. It is surmised that Hou Ken has arrived to kill General Ouki after being defeated by him 9 years prior, and that Ouki had suspected this, which is why he agreed to take on the post of commander-in-chief. Meanwhile, back at the Hi Shin Unit's campsite, the attacker introduces himself as Hoken, Bushin "War God".

== Cast ==
- Kento Yamazaki as Shin (Xin)
- Ryo Yoshizawa as Ei Sei (Ying Zheng)
- Kanna Hashimoto as Ka Ryo Ten (He Liao Diao)
- Nana Seino as Kyou Kai (Qiang Lei)
- Amane Okayama as Bi Hei (Wei Ping)
- Takahiro Miura as Bi Toh (Wei Dao)
- Shinnosuke Mitsushima as Heki (Bi)
- Kunito Watanabe as Shou Kaku (Shang Lu)
- Togi Makabe as Hai Rou (Pei Lang)
- Sō Kaku as Ryu Sen (Long Chuan)
- Miou Tanaka as En (Yuan)
- Takayuki Hamatsu as Taku Kei (Ze Gui)
- Kyosuke Yabe as Yu Gi (You Yi)
- Yūsuke Hirayama as Mou Bu (Meng Wu)
- Riku Hagiwara as Mou Ki (Meng Yi)
- Eri Murakawa as Yu Ri (You Li)
- Hinako Sakurai as Tou Bi (Dong Mei)
- Anne Watanabe as Shi Ka (Zhi Xia)
- Yosuke Asari as Amon (Ya Men)
- Tetta Sugimoto as Dou Ken (Dao Jian)
- Yui Sakuma as Kaine (Hai Yin)
- Mitsuomi Takahashi as Kan Ou (Gan Yang)
- Masaya Kato as Shi Shi (Si Shi)
- Masahiro Takashima as Shou Bun Kun (Lord Changwen)
- Jun Kaname as Toh (Teng)
- Yuki Yamada as Man Goku (Wan Ji)
- Kataoka Ainosuke VI as Fu Ki (Feng Ji)
- Koji Yamamoto as Chou Sou (Zhuang Zhao)
- Masami Nagasawa as You Tan Wa (Yang Duan He)
- Hiroshi Tamaki as Shou Hei Kun (Lord Changping)
- Kōichi Satō as Ryo Fui (Lü Buwei)
- Shun Oguri as Ri Boku (Li Mu)
- Kōji Kikkawa as Hou Ken (Pang Nuan)
- Takao Osawa as Ou Ki (Wang Qi)

== Music ==
The score for Kingdom 3: The Flame of Destiny was once again composed by Yutaka Yamada, and its theme song is "Gold" by Hikaru Utada.

== Box office ==
The total domestic box office gross is 5.6 billion yen ($39.86 million), making it the fifth highest-grossing film of 2023 in Japan.
