= Kingdom (2019 film) =

2019 Japanese film

- Theatrical release poster
- Kanji: キングダム
- Revised Hepburn: Kingudamu
- Directed by: Shinsuke Sato
- Screenplay by: Tsutomu Kuroiwa; Shinsuke Sato; Yasuhisa Hara
- Based on: Kingdom by Yasuhisa Hara
- Produced by: Kouji Hirano; Shirley Kao; Naoaki Kitajima; Shinzou Matsuhashi; Ryousuke Mori
- Starring: Kento Yamazaki; Ryo Yoshizawa; Masami Nagasawa; Kanna Hashimoto; Kanata Hongō; Shinnosuke Mitsushima; Takao Osawa
- Narrated by: Kouichi Yoshinaga
- Cinematography: Tooru Kawazu
- Edited by: Tsuyoshi Imai
- Music by: Yutaka Yamada
- Production company: Credeus
- Distributed by: Toho; Sony Pictures Entertainment (Note: Released under the Columbia Pictures banner.)
- Release date: April 19, 2019
- Running time: 134 minutes
- Country: Japan
- Language: Japanese
- Box office: ¥5.73 billion (Japan); $50.57 million (worldwide)

Kingdom (Japanese: キングダム, Hepburn: Kingudamu) is a 2019 Japanese historical action film directed by Shinsuke Sato and produced by Sony Pictures Japan. It is an adaptation of the manga series of the same name, created by Yasuhisa Hara and published by Shueisha. The screenplay was written by Tsutomu Kuroiwa, Shinsuke Sato and Yasuhisa Hara. Kento Yamazaki, who starred in a 3-minute short of the same name released in 2016, reprises his role as the film's protagonist with a supporting cast that includes Ryo Yoshizawa, Kanna Hashimoto, Masami Nagasawa, Kanata Hongō and Takao Osawa. The film portrays the life of Li Xin, a general of Qin, from his childhood as an orphan through his military career during the Warring States period of ancient China.

Kingdom was released nationwide on April 19, 2019, and it was screened in North America by Funimation in Q3 2019. Three sequels have been released: Kingdom 2: Far and Away (2022), Kingdom 3: The Flame of Destiny (2023) and Kingdom 4: Return of the Great General (2024).

== Plot ==
Orphaned by war, Xin is sold as a slave to a small village, where he befriends Piao, another slave. Growing up, Xin and Piao train together, dreaming of escaping their low status and eventually becoming great generals. Chang Wen Jun visits their village in search of soldiers to aid the king Ying Zheng, but he will only accept Piao. Some time later a mortally wounded Piao appears at Xin's house, warning him that Ying Zheng's brother, Cheng Jiao, has started a power struggle and urging him to go to a point marked on a map he gives him. Xin sets off immediately, not knowing that his village has been set on fire and all the villagers murdered by Cheng Jiao's army.

At the meet-up point, Xin finds Ying Zheng, the king of Qin, where they are ambushed by a skilled Shukyou assassin. Xin realizes that Piao was accepted into the army to serve as Ying Zheng's double due to his bearing a resemblance to the king. Xin kills the assassin and the two escape through a mountain path with help from He Liao Diao, a mountain tribe child who had accompanied the bandits that had previously ambushed Xin. As the three reach the bamboo forest, they are attacked by another assassin. Despite blaming Ying Zheng for Piao's death, Xin defeats the assassin but is poisoned by one of his darts. The three take refuge at an ancient summer resort to help Xin recuperate, while Xin learns that Piao had voluntarily sacrificed himself to serve Ying Zheng, and about Ying Zheng's bitter rivalry with Cheng Jiao, his brother.

Ying Zheng's remaining army finally arrive at the summer resort, including Chang Wen Jun, who was previously assumed to have been killed by General Wang Qi. The army is outnumbered by Cheng Jiao's army of 80,000 soldiers, while Ying Zheng admits that Lü Buwei, the only person who can outmatch him, is also after the throne. Ying Zheng's chooses to seek out help from the Mountain Tribe, a former ally of the Qin royal family that had been betrayed 400 years ago. As they rise into the mountains, they are captured by the Mountain Tribe and brought forth to the chieftain, Yang Duan He. Yang Duan He orders Xin to be beheaded to test Ying Zheng's loyalty, but Xin's dedication to Ying Zheng's goal and mannerisms impress her, after which she announces that the Mountain Tribe will be affiliated with the Qin royalty again.

Ying Zheng's army arrives at the royal palace disguised as part of the Mountain Tribe, under the pretense of helping Cheng Jiao fight against Lü Buwei. Jie Shi, Cheng Jiao's advisor, allows only 50 people inside, and 10 of them to meet with Cheng Jiao. Just inside the gates, Ying Zheng initiates an attack, while Xin, Diao, and Bi use the underground passageway to reach the throne room and assassinate Cheng Jiao. Xin's group is intercepted by Zuo Ci, Ying Zheng's former general, who sends Lang Kai the Executioner after them. Xin kills Lang Kai with the help of the Mountain Tribe, and when they reach Cheng Jiao's room, Zuo Ci defeats Xin's group. Just when it seems Zuo Ci will succeed in killing the exhausted Xin, Xin's memory of Piao and belief in his own dreams brings him renewed strength and he kills Zuo Ci. Cheng Jiao's council flees, but Diao gouges out Jie Shi's eye with a dart and is stabbed by him before he dies. While Diao is safe thanks to wearing armor, Cheng Jiao uses their distraction to escape.

In the courtyard, Cheng Jiao confronts Ying Zheng, but is easily defeated. Ying Zheng spares Cheng Jiao, but beats him up to punish him for the suffering he caused. General Wang Qi and his army appear in the courtyard where he asks Ying Zheng what he will do as king and threatens to behead him if he does not provide a satisfactory answer. Ying Zheng vows to unite China under the Warring States period, even using force as a means to ensure that there would be peace in the future. Satisfied with his answer, General Wang Qi allies with Ying Zheng and orders Cheng Jiao's remaining army to retreat. With the battle won, Xin revels in the glory of making both his and Piao's dreams come true.

== Cast ==
- Kento Yamazaki as Shin (Xin)
  - Riku Ōnishi as young Shin (Xin)
- Ryo Yoshizawa as Hyo (Piao) and Eisei (Ying Zheng)
  - Ryōka Minamide as young Hyo (Piao)
- Kanna Hashimoto as Ka Ryo Ten (He Liao Diao)
- Masami Nagasawa as Yo Tan Wa (Yang Duan He)
- Kanata Hongō as Sei Kyo (Cheng Jiao)
- Shinnosuke Mitsushima as Heki (Bi)
- Masahiro Takashima as Shou Bun Kun (Lord Changwen)
- Jun Kaname as Toh (Teng)
- Shinnosuke Abe as Bajio
- Wataru Ichinose as Tajifu
- Tak Sakaguchi as General Saji (Zuo Ci)
- Ami 201 as Ran Kai (Lang Kai)
- Yuhei Ouchida as Ton (Dun)
- Jun Hashimoto as Muta
- Naomasa Musaka as village chief
- Motoki Fukami as Vicious Scarlet
- Takashi Ukaji as Gi Kou (Wei Xing)
- Masaya Kato as Shi Shi (Si Shi)
- Renji Ishibashi as Ketsu Shi (Jie Shi)
- Takao Osawa as General Ou Ki (Wang Qi)

== Production ==
Production took place in Japan, and filming occurred in China and Japan during April 2018.

On April 18, 2018, Hara tweeted a full-size cover illustration promoting the manga's move to the big screen. A trailer was released by Sony Pictures on January 16, 2019. The film was released nationwide on April 19, 2019.

An English-subtitled trailer was screened at SXSW 2019 in March, where lead actor Kento Yamazaki had paid a courtesy call to the vice president of Sony Pictures International. Funimation later announced that they were holding screenings of the film during the second quarter of 2019.

== Music ==
The score for Kingdom was composed by Yutaka Yamada, and its theme song is "Wasted Nights" by One Ok Rock.

== Reception ==
=== Box office ===
The film earned 729 million Yen (US$6.17 million) in its opening three-day weekend, selling over 500,000 tickets. As of June 16, 2019, the film has earned over ¥5.47 billion ($50.4 million)

The first film eventually earned a cumulative total of ¥5.73B or roughly $53.2M USD.

=== Home media ===
An English-language subtitled trailer was released by Toho in March to promote a North American release. Funimation Films acquired the license for an American and Canadian release in the summer. The film was released in North America on August 16.

=== Critical reception ===
On Rotten Tomatoes the film has an approval rating of 94% based on reviews from 16 critics.

=== Awards and nominations ===
Award	Category	Nominee	Result	Ref.
44th Hochi Film Award	Best Director	Shinsuke Sato	Won	
10th Location Japan Awards	Best Director	Shinsuke Sato	Won	
62nd Blue Ribbon Awards	Supporting Actor Award	Ryo Yoshizawa	Won	
VFX-Japan Awards 2020	Excellence Award	Kingdom	Won	
VFX-Japan Awards 2020	Best Award	Kingdom	Nominated	
43rd Japan Academy Film Prize	Best Film	Kingdom	Nominated	
43rd Japan Academy Film Prize	Best Director	Shinsuke Sato	Nominated	
43rd Japan Academy Film Prize	Best Cinematography	Tarō Kawazu	Won	
43rd Japan Academy Film Prize	Best Supporting Actor	Ryo Yoshizawa	Won	
43rd Japan Academy Film Prize	Best Supporting Actress	Masami Nagasawa	Won	
43rd Japan Academy Film Prize	Best Lighting Direction	Kingdom	Won	
43rd Japan Academy Film Prize	Best Art Direction	Iwao Saitō	Won	

== Sequels ==
On May 28, 2020, a sequel film was announced to be in production. Shinsuke Sato would be returning as director; Kento Yamazaki, Ryō Yoshizawa, and Kanna Hashimoto are returning cast members. Titled Kingdom 2: Far and Away, it was released in Japan on July 15, 2022, and generated ¥5.16 billion in box office revenue within Japan.

A third film, with the director and much of the cast returning, titled Kingdom 3: The Flame of Destiny (キングダム 運命の炎, Kingudamu: Unmei no Hōno), was released on July 28, 2023.

The fourth installment, Kingdom 4: Return of the Great General (キングダム 大将軍の帰還, Kingudamu Daishōgun no Kikan), was released in Japan on July 12, 2024.

The fifth film, Kingdom 5: The Clash of Souls (キングダム 魂の決戦, Kingudamu Tamashii no Kessen), was released in Japan on July 17, 2026.
