= Ryo Yoshizawa =

Japanese actor (born 1994)

- 吉沢 亮
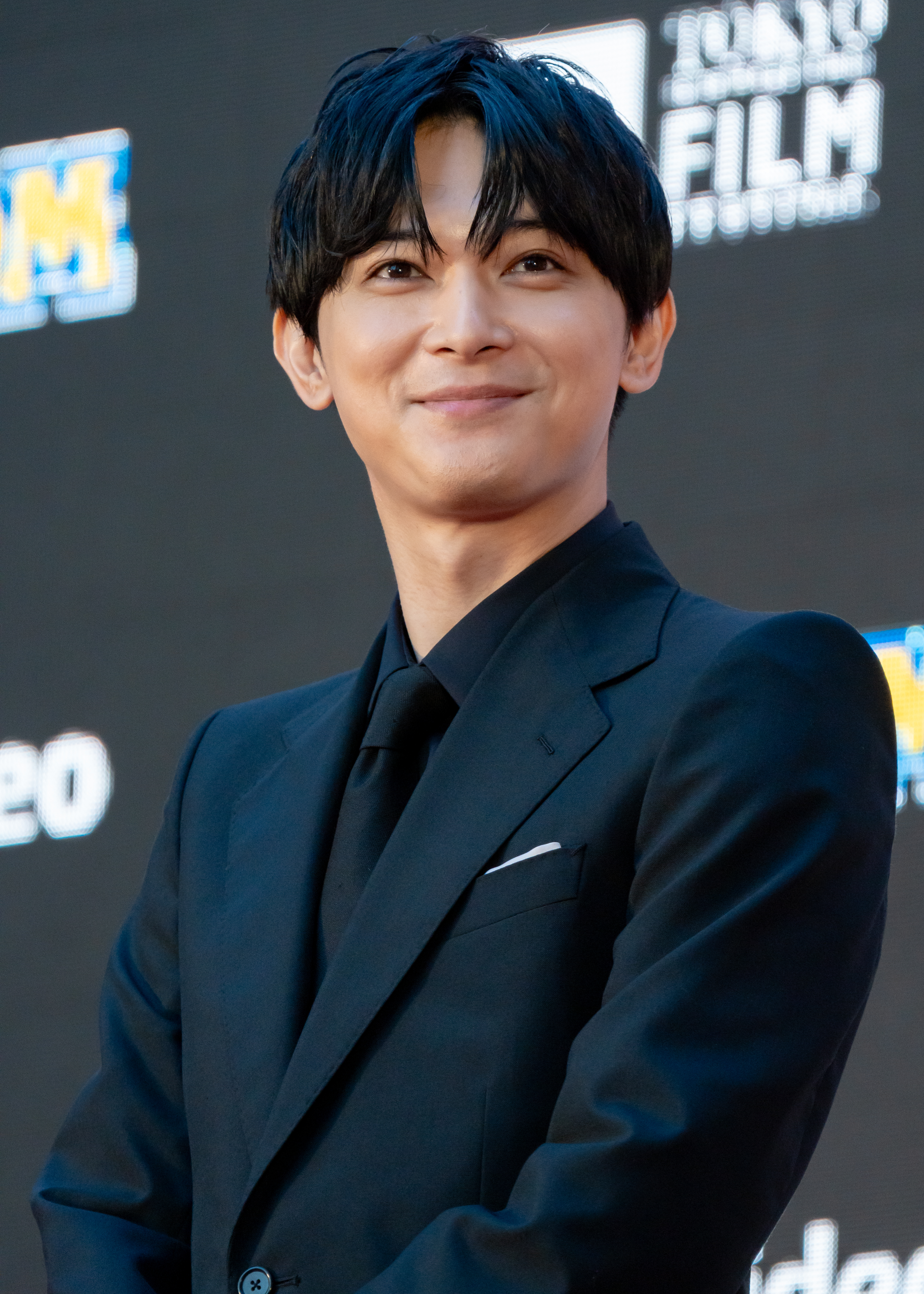
- Yoshizawa at the Tokyo International Film Festival in October 2023
- Born: February 1, 1994 (age 32); Tokyo, Japan
- Occupation: Actor
- Years active: 2009–present
- Agent: Amuse Inc.

Ryo Yoshizawa (吉沢 亮, Yoshizawa Ryō; born February 1, 1994) is a Japanese actor. His breakthrough roles include Sogo Okita in the Gintama live-action films, King Ei Sei/Hyou in Kingdom series, and Manjiro "Mikey" Sano in Tokyo Revengers. He is known for his expressive eyes and natural acting style. He is also known for his role in tokusatsu, as Ryusei Sakuta/Kamen Rider Meteor in Kamen Rider Fourze. In 2025 he starred as Kikuo Tachibana in Japan's highest-grossing domestic live-action movie ever, Kokuho which won him numerous acting awards including Japan Academy Film Prize for Best Actor in a Leading Role.

== Early life ==
Yoshizawa was born on February 1, 1994 in Tokyo, Japan. He is the second of four sons. His parents divorced when he was younger and after that, he lived with his mother and three brothers in Akishima until 2016 before moving out to live on his own. Yoshizawa holds second dan in kendo, which he has been practicing for over nine years. He is known for being introverted and preferred to stay indoors since childhood. His mother describes his personality as "Easily misunderstood, quiet but passionate". On the other hand, his brothers said whenever at home he is someone who is just there, silently grinning while playing with his phone or reading manga.

== Career ==
=== 2009–2015: Career beginnings and initial setbacks ===
Yoshizawa began his acting career after winning the "Right-on" award at Amuse National Audition 2009 The Push! Man held by talent agency Amuse. He competed against 31,514 other applicants. Yoshizawa's mother was the one who encouraged him to join the audition. He was motivated because of the 1 million yen prize money but then felt disappointed when he only got a special award without monetary reward. A month after the audition announcement ceremony, he was contacted by a manager and agreed to sign with Amuse.

In the beginning of 2011, Yoshizawa made his television drama debut in Sign with other Amuse actors like Dori Sakurada and Takuya Uehara. In the second half of that year, he starred in NHK youth drama Kingyo Club. He went on to portray Ryusei Sakuta in Kamen Rider Fourze, making his debut in the seventeenth episode. In an interview related to his role as Ryusei Sakuta, Yoshizawa revealed his inspiration behind his character's split personality and his first experience in ADR recording. Yoshizawa compared his character to that of Light Yagami from Death Note. He also watched Bruce Lee films as a reference, as his character frequently performed the trademark kiai of "Howatchā" (ホワッチャーッ) when firing punches or kicks.

Four years into his acting career, after doing many supporting roles he got an opportunity to be leading actor through audition in 2013 TBS mixed production of serial drama and stage play Bussen, which told a story about monk protégé Shosuke Tamura's comedic misadventure in a buddhist school. Contrary to Yoshizawa's expectation of his long awaited lead role, Bussen got low ratings during its broadcast. Furthermore, the stage play barely brought audience it could not fill even half the theatre seats. Disappointed by the result, Yoshizawa who until that point felt that being an actor was just a part-time job he could quit anytime, started to rethink the weight of being in the spotlight. He said that experience of not being able to fill the theatre sparked his fire to keep acting and take the job more seriously.

=== 2016–2020: Rising popularity and breakthrough ===
In 2017, he portrayed the role of Shinsengumi 1st Division Captain Okita Sougo in the 2017 live-action film of the popular manga series Gintama, and reprised the role in the sequel, Gintama 2, in 2018. In 2018 alone, he actively participated in acting, appearing in 8 movies, 2 dramas, and 1 play. Among them, River's Edge, a film of the same name based on Kyoko Okazaki's manga, was submitted to the Panorama section of the 68th Berlin International Film Festival, and Yoshizawa appeared at an international film festival for the first time with director Isao Yukisada and actress Fumi Nikaido. In addition, for this work, he won the Best New Actor Award at the 10th Tama Film Festival, the Best New Actor Award at the 40th Yokohama Film Festival, and the Best New Actor Award at the 42nd Japan Academy Awards.

In NHK's 100th serial morning drama, Natsuzora which aired from April 2019, Yoshizawa played the role of Yamada Tenyo, a character based on the real-life painter Kanda Nissho, a childhood friend of the protagonist Natsu. He was selected through an audition of over 2,500 people. Since the airing of the 23rd week, in which his character Tenyo last appears, 'Tenyo-kun' has appeared in real-time trends on Twitter, to the point where people are suffering from 'Tenyo-kun aftereffects'. Around the same time, the film Kingdom was released. Produced on a large-scale budget for a Japanese film, Yoshizawa was cast in the prominent supporting role of Ei Sei, second only to the protagonist in importance. Producer Shinzo Matsuhashi defended the casting against concerns over Yoshizawa's limited public recognition, reportedly stating, "He is certain to become a star within three years." Matsuhashi's support ultimately secured the casting. The film went on to become a major commercial success, grossing more than 5.7 billion yen at the Japanese box office. His performance in Natsuzora and movie Kingdom earned him the 2020 Elan d'or Awards for Rookie of the Year.

In September 2019, it was announced that Yoshizawa had been chosen to portray Shibusawa Eiichi, the lead character of NHK's 60th taiga drama, Reach Beyond the Blue Sky which is scheduled to air from February until December 2021. Yoshizawa is the first Heisei-born actor to play the lead role in a taiga drama, he was selected through an offer from NHK and it was said that there were many recommendations from the production team who worked with him on Natsuzora.

Yoshizawa also attempted voice acting for the first time, performing two roles in his first attempt at Super Peace Busters' new work, Her Blue Sky. With this work, Yoshizawa attended the Sitges Film Festival, where the work was submitted, along with director Tatsuyuki Nagai and actress Riho Yoshioka. He also voiced original character, Rody Soul, for third movie version of the animation series My Hero Academia, which was released on August 6, 2021.

=== 2021–present: Acclaim in television and film ===
From October 2022, Yoshizawa took on his first lead role in Getsuku (Golden Time) drama, PICU: Pediatric Intensive Care Unit, playing the role of Takeshiro Shikota. It is also his first doctor character since his debut and the average viewer rating of the drama was 8.5%. He reprised his role for the special drama and spin-off of PICU: Pediatric Intensive Care Unit, which aired in April 2024.

Yoshizawa alongside actress Aoi Miyazaki starred in a Netflix mystery & romance comedy movie, In Love and Deep Water, that premiered in November 2023 which Yuji Sakamoto was the screenwriter.

Yoshizawa stars in Lee Sang-il's 2025 film Kokuho (lit. 'National Treasure'). He plays Kikuo Tachibana, a yakuza's son who performs as a woman in kabuki. The film is based on the novel by Shuichi Yoshida and tells the story of two men from different backgrounds who become rivals in kabuki, one a yakuza's son and the other a kabuki heir, in postwar Japan. Kokuho has been officially selected for the 57th Directors' Fortnight at the 78th Cannes Film Festival.

Following Natsuzora, Yoshizawa was announced to join another morning drama, The Ghost Writer's Wife, as Yuichi Nishikori, an English teacher who will have a major impact on the lives of the heroines Toki Matsuno (Akari Takaishi) and Heaven (Tommy Bastow). His second morning drama is scheduled to air in the second half of 2025.

== Personal life ==
Yoshizawa was questioned by the police after an incident on December 30, 2024 where he had drunkenly entered a neighbor's unlocked apartment without permission, mistaking the unit as his own, to use their restroom. As a result, Asahi Beer dropped their endorsement deal with him and Shochiku delayed Babanba Banban Vampire movie initially set to release on February 14, 2025. On the other hand, Iris Ohyama announced that it would continue its commercials contract with him thanks to longstanding mutual trust, earning praise online. Yoshizawa and his neighbor reached settlement outside of court and he has since moved out from the apartment building.

== Filmography ==
=== TV series ===
Year	Title	Role	Other notes	Ref.
2011	Sign	Yūki Nagi		
2011	Kingyo Club	Shō Yanahashi		
2011–12	Kamen Rider Fourze	Ryūsei Sakuta/Kamen Rider Meteor		
2012	Please Do Something	Keita Yabe	Episode 2	
2013	3-in-1 House Share	Negishi		
2013	Bussen	Shosuke Tamura		
2013	The Liar and His Lover: Sidestory	Yuichi Kimijima		
2014	Lost Days	Natsu Takano		
2014	The Man with World's Biggest Potential	Ikeda		
2014	Water Polo Yankees	Shinsuke Kato		
2014	Hell Teacher Nube	Katsuya Kimura		
2015	Heat	Kohei Matsuyama		
2015	Ichiro	Iemochi Tokugawa	Episode 1	
2015	Lady Girls	Ryosuke Maekawa		
2016	Please Love Me	Junta Sano	Episode 1	
2016	Criminologist Himura and Mystery Writer Arisugawa	Eisuke Hata	Episode 2	
2016	The Single Teacher Miss Hayako	Hayato Kitsuregawa	Episodes 4-7	
2016	Budokan	Daichi Mizushima		
2016	Cold Case	Junichi Kudo	Episode 1	
2017	Tomodachi Game	Yūichi Katagiri	Lead role	
2017	Inside Mari	Isao Komori		
2017	Gintama: Mitsuba Hen	Sogo Okita		
2017	Shimokitazawa Die Hard	Kidnapper	Episode 1	
2017	Love and Hong Kong	Kenta Yamada	Lead role; miniseries	
2018	Survival Wedding	Yuichi Kashiwagi		
2018	Gintama of the Unusual	Sogo Okita	Episode 1	
2018	Giver: Revenge's Giver	Giba	Lead role	
2019	Natsuzora: Natsu's Sky	Ten'yō Yamada	Asadora	
2019	Les Misérables	Jun Baba (younger)	TV movie	
2020	Hanzawa Naoki 2: Episode 0	Kei Kōsaka	Lead role; TV movie	
2020	Hanzawa Naoki 2	Kei Kōsaka	Episode 3; cameo	
2021	Reach Beyond the Blue Sky	Shibusawa Eiichi	Lead role; Taiga drama	
2022	PICU	Takeshirō Shikota	Lead role	
2025–26	The Ghost Writer's Wife	Yūichi Nishikōri	Asadora	

=== Films ===
Year	Title	Role	Other notes	Ref.
2011	Kamen Rider × Kamen Rider Fourze & OOO: Movie War Mega Max	Ryūsei Sakuta/Kamen Rider Meteor	Credited as "Mysterious student"	
2012	Kamen Rider × Super Sentai: Super Hero Taisen	Ryūsei Sakuta/Kamen Rider Meteor		
2012	Kamen Rider Fourze the Movie: Space, Here We Come!	Ryūsei Sakuta/Kamen Rider Meteor		
2012	Toei Hero Next 2: The Future I'm Executing	Riseman	Lead role	
2012	Kamen Rider × Kamen Rider Wizard & Fourze: Movie War Ultimatum	Ryūsei Sakuta/Kamen Rider Meteor		
2013	The Liar and His Lover	Yuichi Kimijima		
2013	Daily Lives of High School Boys	Hidenori Tabata		
2014	Blue Spring Ride	Aya Kominato		
2016	Wolf Girl and Black Prince	Yū Kusakabe		
2016	Dangerous Cops: Final 5 Days	Kazunori Kawasumi		
2017	Gintama	Sogo Okita		
2017	Tomodachi Game: The Movie	Yūichi Katagiri	Lead role	
2017	Tomodachi Game: The Movie – Final	Yūichi Katagiri	Lead role	
2017	Psychic Kusuo	Shun Kaidō		
2018	River's Edge	Ichiro Yamada	Lead role	
2018	That Girl's Captives of Love	Yori Suzuki	Lead role	
2018	Evil and the Mask	Ryōsuke Itō		
2018	Marmalade Boy	Yū Matsuura	Lead role	
2018	Reon	Tōru Ichijō		
2018	The Cat in Their Arms	Cat Yoshio	Lead role	
2018	Bleach	Uryū Ishida		
2018	Gintama 2	Sogo Okita		
2019	Kingdom	Ei Sei/Hyou		
2020	Not Quite Dead Yet	Matsuoka		
2020	Sakura	Hajime Hasegawa		
2020	Blue, Painful, Fragile	Kaede Tabata	Lead role	
2020	Awake	Eiichi	Lead role	
2021	Tokyo Revengers	Manjiro "Mikey" Sano		
2022	Kingdom 2: Far and Away	Ei Sei		
2022	Black Night Parade	Miharu Hino	Lead role	
2023	Familia	Manabu		
2023	In Love and Deep Water	Suguru Ubukata	Lead role	
2023	Tokyo Revengers 2: Bloody Halloween Part 1	Manjiro "Mikey" Sano		
2023	Tokyo Revengers 2: Bloody Halloween Part 2	Manjiro "Mikey" Sano		
2023	Kingdom 3: The Flame of Destiny	Ei Sei		
2023	Family	Makoto	Lead role	
2024	Living in Two Worlds	Dai Igarashi	Lead role	
2024	Kingdom 4: Return of the Great General	Ei Sei		
2025	Kokuho	Kikuo Tachibana	Lead role	
2025	Babanba Banban Vampire	Mori Ranmaru	Lead role	
2026	Kingdom 5: The Clash of Souls	Ei Sei		

=== Stage ===
Year	Title	Role	Other notes	Ref.
2010	Black Pearl	Rum	Stage play	
2013	Bussen	Shosuke Tamura	Stage play	
2015	Tokyo Head	Jeffry Kashiwa	Stage play	
2016	Raiō no Terasu	Keo-Fa	Stage play	
2017	Hyakki Opera Rashomon	Takehiro	Stage play	
2020	The Producers	Leo Bloom	Musical	
2022	Mercury Fur	Elliot	Stage play	
2026	Dear Evan Hansen	Evan Hansen	Musical	

=== Voice work ===
Year	Title	Role	Other notes	Ref.
2019	Her Blue Sky	Shinnosuke Kanamuro/Shinno	Anime movie	
2021	My Hero Academia: World Heroes' Mission	Rody Soul	Anime movie	
2022	Tokyo National Museum 150th Anniversary Special Exhibition: "National Treasure: Everything About the Tokyo National Museum"	Navigator	Audio guide	
2025	My Hero Academia: Final Season	Rody Soul	Television anime	
2026	Shin Gekijōban Keroro Gunsō: Fukkatsu Shite Sokkō Chikyū Metsubō no Kiki de Arimasu!	Sogo Okita	Anime movie	

=== Others ===
Year	Title	Role	Notes	Ref.
2010-2011	Disney 365	MC		
2012-2013	Honoo-no Taiiku-kai TV	Kendo club member		
2014-2017	Koin Toss	Panelist	Season 1-6	
2016	Good Night Prince	Story teller	Season 1	
2019-present	Futto Word 10	Crab-obsessed actor	Obsessed celebrity segment	
2020	Zip!	Friday personality	News program	
2020	71st NHK Kōhaku Uta Gassen	Judge		

== Awards and nominations ==
Year	Award	Category	Work(s)	Result	Ref.
2018	10th Tama Film Awards	Best Emerging Actor	River's Edge, Marmalade Boy, and Gintama 2	Won	
2019	40th Yokohama Film Festival	Best Newcomer	River's Edge, Marmalade Boy, and Gintama 2	Won	
2019	42nd Japan Academy Film Prize	Newcomer of the Year	River's Edge	Won	
2020	62nd Blue Ribbon Awards	Best Supporting Actor	Kingdom	Won	
2020	43rd Japan Academy Film Prize	Best Supporting Actor	Kingdom	Won	
2020	44th Elan d'or Awards	Newcomer of the Year	Himself	Won	
2022	30th Hashida Awards	Newcomer of the Year	Reach Beyond the Blue Sky	Won	
2024	16th Tama Film Awards	Best Actor	Living in Two Worlds, Kingdom 4: Return of the Great General, Family	Won	
2025	34th Japan Movie Critics Awards	Best Actor	Living in Two Worlds	Won	
2025	17th Tama Film Awards	Best Actor	Kokuho, Babanba Banban Vampire	Won	
2025	38th Nikkan Sports Film Awards	Best Actor	Kokuho, Babanba Banban Vampire	Won	
2025	50th Hochi Film Awards	Best Actor	Kokuho	Won	
2025	GQ Men of The Year 2025	Best Actor	Kokuho	Won	
2025	Elle Cinema Awards 2025	Elle Men Award	Kokuho	Won	
2026	47th Yokohama Film Festival	Best Actor	Kokuho	Won	
2026	80th Mainichi Film Awards	Best Lead Performance	Kokuho	Won	
2026	68th Blue Ribbon Awards	Best Actor	Kokuho	Nominated	
2026	49th Japan Academy Film Prize	Best Actor	Kokuho	Won	
2026	35th Japan Movie Critics Awards	Best Actor	Kokuho	Won	
2026	45th Zenkoku Eiren Awards	Best Actor	Kokuho	Won	
2026	99th Kinema Junpo Awards	Best Actor	Kokuho and Babanba Banban Vampire	Won	
2026	43rd Asakusa Performing Arts Awards	Encouragement Award	Himself	Won	
