= Demon City (film) =

Demon City is a 2025 Japanese film

- Directed by: Seiji Tanaka
- Written by: Seiji Tanaka
- Based on: Oni goroshi by Masamichi Kawabe
- Produced by: Yasuhiro Masaoka; Takeshi Sawa
- Starring: Toma Ikuta; Masahiro Higashide; Miou Tanaka
- Cinematography: Kohei Kato
- Edited by: Zensuke Hori
- Music by: Tomoyasu Hotei
- Distributed by: Netflix
- Release date: 27 February 2025
- Running time: 107 minutes
- Country: Japan
- Language: Japanese

Demon City (transl. 鬼ゴロシ) is a 2025 Japanese live-action manga adaptation, written and directed by Seiji Tanaka, starring Toma Ikuta in lead role as Shuhei Sakata.

== Synopsis ==
Shûhei Sakata is a skilled hitman, but after his last job he is ambushed at his family home by five men wearing Oni masks. His wife and daughter are shot and he is left with a gunshot to the head. Despite being comatose, he spends 12 years being taken care of by a friend. After he returns to the city, his friend asks the driver to take care of Sakata. As they are about to climb the stairs, one man attacks stabs him to his hands and he fell and is taken to the hospital by his friend.

Sakata gets attacked in the hospital by one of the men on Oni mask, who injects his drip. Sakata attacks the man back but because he isn't stable enough to fight, the man attacks him more. One of the man's accomplice lures a security man to help arrange the scattered room. The security man suspects the masked man, asking if he knows Sakata. The masked man ignores him and gets him killed with the help of the accomplice. As they turn, they see an old male doctor viewing through the door. Afraid that the doctor may expose them, they get him killed. The two gets into fighting with Sakata, who throws the accomplice to the ground through the window and eventually strangles the masked man. Sakata leaves the hospital into his friend's car who is waiting for him in front of the hospital, while the police investigates the accomplice's body lying on the ground.

Sakata attacks the workshop of the villain. Hearing that he gets his mobility back, and regains his physical capabilities, and finds his alive child and seeks bloody revenge on the men who took his family away from him, on the eve of them opening up a megacomplex.

== Cast ==
- Toma Ikuta as Shuhei Sakata
- Masahiro Higashide as Kanta Fase
- Miou Tanaka as Homare Takamoto
- Ami Touma as Ryo Sakata, Shuhei's daughter
- Taro Suruga as Akira Fujita
- Mai Kiryu as Aoi, Shuhei's wife and Ryo's mother who deceased 12 years ago
- Naoto Takenaka as Haruo Kawano
- Takuma Otoo as Yoshihito Takigawa
- Masanobu Takashima as Kotaro Shinozuka
- Onoe Matsuya II as Ryu Sunohara

== Production ==
Principal photography took place in Shinjo, Yamagata and film wrapped in April 2024.

=== Release ===
The film was digitally released on Netflix on February 27, 2025.
