= Tokyo Revengers (film) =

2021 Japanese film directed by Tsutomu Hanabusa

- Theatrical release poster
- Directed by: Tsutomu Hanabusa
- Screenplay by: Izumi Takahashi
- Based on: Tokyo Revengers by Ken Wakui
- Produced by: Shota Okada
- Starring: Takumi Kitamura; Yuki Yamada; Yosuke Sugino; Mio Imada; Shotaro Mamiya; Ryo Yoshizawa
- Cinematography: Tomo Ezaki
- Edited by: Sagara Naoichiro
- Music by: Yutaka Yamada
- Production companies: Fuji Television Network; Kadokawa Daiei Studios
- Distributed by: Warner Bros. Pictures
- Release date: July 9, 2021 (Japan)
- Running time: 120 minutes
- Country: Japan

Tokyo Revengers (Japanese: 東京卍リベンジャーズ, Hepburn: Tōkyō Ribenjāzu) is a 2021 Japanese science fiction action film directed by Tsutomu Hanabusa from a screenplay by Izumi Takahashi. It is the live-action adaptation of manga series of the same name by Ken Wakui. The film stars Takumi Kitamura, Yuki Yamada, Yosuke Sugino, Mio Imada, Shotaro Mamiya and Ryo Yoshizawa. The film revolves around Takemichi Hanagaki, a freeter, who travels back in time in order to prevent the death of his ex-girlfriend Hinata Tachibana at the hands of Toman, a criminal organization.

The live-action film adaptation was announced in February 2020. In April 2020, it was announced that the film's crew has halted filming due to the COVID-19 pandemic in Japan.

== Plot ==
During the year 2017, Takemichi Hanagaki, a 26-year-old freeter, learns that his middle school ex-girlfriend Hinata Tachibana and her younger brother Naoto Tachibana have been killed by the Tokyo Manji Gang (also known as Toman). When Takemichi is pushed in front of a train, he teleports exactly 12 years into the year 2005. While reliving his middle school years, Takemichi meets with Naoto and divulges the exact date that he and Hinata will die. When they shake hands, Takemichi is suddenly transported back to the present, creating a time paradox where Naoto survives and is now a detective.

Naoto deduces that every time they hold hands, Takemichi is transported 12 years into the past. Using his knowledge from the future, Takemichi vows to save Hinata. Travelling back to the past, Takemichi's friends are forced into underground matches led by Kiyomasa, a member of the Toman. Takemichi's determination to protect them gains the respect of the gang's leader, Manjiro Sano aka "Mikey". Takemichi discovers that his new friendship with Mikey prevented one of his friends, Akkun, from going to prison in the present. However, Akkun commits suicide out of fear, and Takemichi realizes that Toman poses a stronger threat to his friends than he initially thought.

Takemichi travels back to his past and finds that the Tokyo Manji Gang is declaring war on Moebius, a rival gang, to avenge Pah-chin's friend. Takemichi learns that Mikey's second-in-command, Ken Ryūgūji aka "Draken" will eventually be killed and lead to Mikey becoming violent. Draken survives the rumble, but Pah-chin turns himself to the police after stabbing Moebius' leader Osanai, which later causes infighting within the Toman. Takemichi finally resolves Mikey and Draken's dispute. On August 3, 2005, the Tokyo Manji Gang are attacked by a group of Moebius members, who are led by Valhalla member Shūji Hanma.

Takemichi learns that Peh-yan colluded with them out of anger for Mikey and Draken letting Pah-chin be arrested, while Kiyomasa had stabbed Draken for humiliating him and causing him to be exiled from the Tokyo Manji Gang. The Tokyo Manji Gang wins the fight, where Takemichi defeats Kiyomasa and admits Draken to the hospital. Draken recovers from his injuries and Peh-yan apologizes for his actions. Takemichi travels back to the present timeline and heads to Hinata's house to meet Naoto, where he finally meets Hinata.

== Cast ==
- Takumi Kitamura as Takemichi Hanagaki
- Mio Imada as Hinata Tachibana
- Yuki Yamada as Ken Ryūgūji aka "Draken"
- Ryo Yoshizawa as Manjiro Sano aka "Mikey"
- Shotaro Mamiya as Tetta Kisaki
- Nobuyuki Suzuki as Masataka Kiyomaza
- Gordon Maeda as Takashi Mitsuya
- Yosuke Sugino as Naoto Tachibana
- Hiroya Shimizu as Shuji Hanma
- Hayato Isomura as Atsushi Sendo

== Soundtrack ==
The music is composed by Yutaka Yamada and the theme song for the film "Namae wo Yobu yo" (名前を呼ぶよ) was performed by Super Beaver.

== Sequel ==
The makers announced the sequel, titled Tokyo Revengers 2: Bloody Halloween-hen (東京リベンジャーズ2 血のハロウィン編, Tōkyō Ribenjāzu 2 Chi no Harowin-hen), in July 2022. It adapts the "Bloody Halloween" arc and will be released as a two-part film titled Unmei (運命; Destiny) and Kessen (決戦; Decisive Battle). The first film was premiered on April 21, 2023, and the second premiered on June 30, 2023. There will be new cast members which include Kento Nagayama, Nijiro Murakami, and Mahiro Takasugi. Super Beaver will be composing the theme songs for both films titled "Gradation" (グラデーション) and "Hakanakunai" (儚くない), respectively.
