= Jun Kaname =

Japanese actor

- 要 潤
- Born: February 21, 1981 (age 45); Mitoyo, Kagawa, Japan
- Occupations: Actor; tarento
- Years active: 2001–present
- Agent: Plan-D
- Spouse: Atsuko Matsufuji (m. 2013)
- Children: 2

Jun Kaname (要 潤, Kaname Jun; born February 21, 1981) is a Japanese actor and tarento. He was born in Mitoyo, Kagawa and made his drama debut as an actor in 2001 in the Tokusatsu Series "Kamen Rider Agito". He appears not only in TV dramas but also in movies, commercial messages, variety TV programs, plays, and music videos. Kaname married a non-celebrity business woman on April 28, 2013, later revealed to be former celebrity Atsuko Matsufuji. They have two children together.

== Filmography ==
=== Television ===
- Kamen Rider Agito (2001), Makoto Hikawa/Kamen Riders G3 & G3-X
- Kamen Rider Agito: A New Transformation (2001), Makoto Hikawa/Kamen Rider G3-X
- Shin Ai no Arashi (2002), Takeshi Torii
- Yaoh (2006), Osamu Shu
- Ryōmaden (2010), Sawamura Sōnojō
- Lady: The Last Criminal Profile (2011), Terada Takehiko
- Kyō Kara Hitman (2014), Tokichi Inaba
- Reach Beyond the Blue Sky (2021), Matsudaira Yoshinaga
- The Grand Family (2021), Ataru Mima
- Tokyo MER: Mobile Emergency Room (2021), Mikio Senju
- My Ex-Boyfriend's Last Will (2022), Takumi Morikawa
- Lost Man Found (2022), Tsukamoto
- Ranman (2023), Akihisa Tanabe
- Fixer (2023), Shinnosuke Maruoka
- Oshi no Ko (2024), Masaya Kaburagi
- Chihayafuru: Full Circle (2025), Susumu Aizawa
- Brothers in Arms (2026), Akechi Mitsuhide

=== Films ===
- Kamen Rider Agito: Project G4 (2001), Makoto Hikawa/Kamen Rider G3-X
- Casshern (2004)
- Turtles Are Surprisingly Fast Swimmers (2005)
- All to the Sea (2010)
- Kingdom (2019), Teng
- Love Like the Falling Petals (2022), Kamiya
- Kingdom 2: Far and Away (2022), Teng
- Tokyo MER: Mobile Emergency Room – The Movie (2023), Mikio Senju
- Kingdom 3: The Flame of Destiny (2023), Teng
- Kingdom 4: Return of the Great General (2024), Teng
- Sisam (2024)
- Oshi no Ko: The Final Act (2024), Masaya Kaburagi
- Bullet Train Explosion (2025), Mitsuru Todoroki
- Tokyo MER: Mobile Emergency Room – Capital Crisis (2026), Senju
- Agito: Psychic War (2026), Makoto Hikawa/G7
- Kingdom 5: The Clash of Souls (2026), Teng
- Hara o Kukutte (2027)
