= Masaya Kato =

Japanese model, actor, and voice actor

- 加藤 雅也
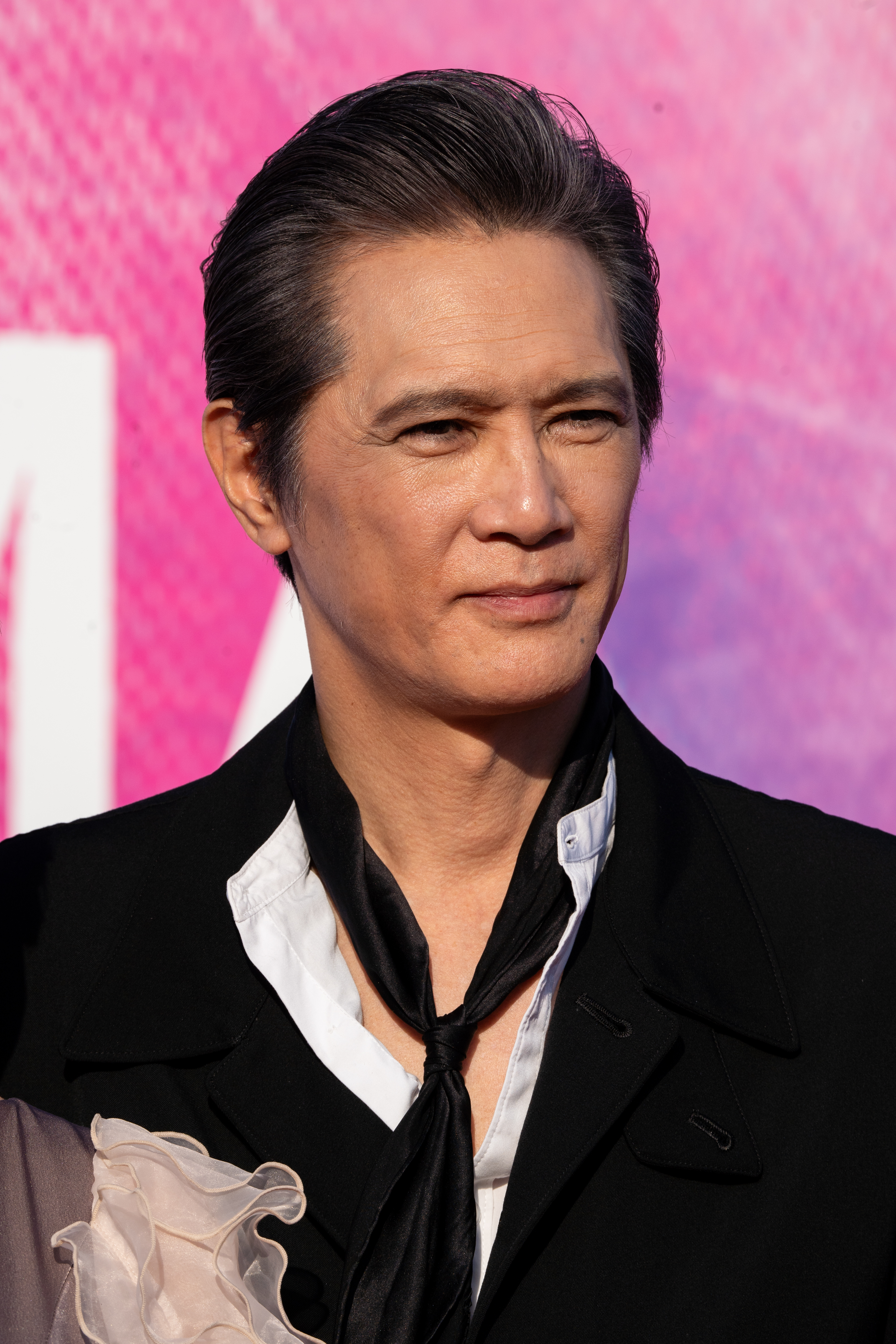
- Katosl at the Yokohama International Film Festival in 2024
- Born: April 27, 1963 (age 63); Nara, Japan
- Occupation: Actor
- Years active: 1988–present
- Agent: Burning Production
- Website: www.jap.co.jp/masaya/

Masaya Kato (加藤 雅也, Katō Masaya; born April 27, 1963) is a Japanese actor from Nara in the Kansai region.

== Life and career ==
He is currently attached to Burning Production. He stands at 183 centimeters. He practices martial arts and performs his own stunts in movies.

== Filmography ==
=== Films ===
- 1988: Shiro and Marilyn
- 1989: Tokyo: The Last War
- 1992: The Setting Sun
- 1992: Gekashitsu
- 1993: Crime Broker
- 1994: The Seventh Floor - Mitsuru.
- 1995: Crying Freeman
- 1997: Drive - Advanced Model.
- 1997: Sandy Whitelaw
- 1998: Godzilla – Masaya Katō
- 2000: Schoolday of the Dead
- 2000: Brother
- 2000: Women of the Night
- 2000: Okinawa Rendez-vous
- 2001: Agitator
- 2001: Good Advice
- 2002: Muscle Heat
- 2003: Aragami
- 2003: Samurai Resurrection
- 2003: Gozu
- 2003: The Man in White
- 2005: The Last Supper
- 2006: Fighter in the Wind
- 2006: Sakura
- 2007: Unfair: The Movie
- 2009: Shinjuku Incident – Toshinari Eguchi.
- 2010: Goodbye, Someday
- 2014: Unsung Hero
- 2015: The Edge of Sin
- 2016: Unrequited Love
- 2016: Shimauma – Shimauma
- 2016: Sanada 10 Braves – Sanada Yukimura
- 2017: Re:Born
- 2019: The Nikaidos' Fall – Tatsuya Nikaido
- 2019: Kingdom – Si Shi
- 2019: Sleep in the Shadows – Fuyuki Hazama
- 2019: We Make Antiques! Kyoto Rendezvous
- 2020: The Gun 2020
- 2020: The Payoff
- 2020: Sakura – Mizoguchi
- 2020: Hope – Detective Teranuma
- 2020: Dancing in Her Dreams
- 2021: Nishinari Goro's 400 Million Yen
- 2021: Gunkan Shōnen – Genkai Sakamoto
- 2022: Kingdom 2: Far and Away – Si Shi
- 2022: Lightning Over the Beyond
- 2022: Grandfather's Crock
- 2023: Song of Kamuy
- 2023: Bad City – Hirayama
- 2023: One Second Ahead, One Second Behind – Hajime's father
- 2023: See Hear Love
- 2023: From Spice with Love
- 2023: Kingdom 3: The Flame of Destiny – Si Shi
- 2024: Let's Go Karaoke!
- 2024: Kingdom 4: Return of the Great General – Si Shi
- 2024: Ghosts Dream Selfish Dreams
- 2024: KY Rock
- 2024: Unbeatable: Road to Tokyo – Ryuji Kato
- 2024: Ranpo no Gen'ei
- 2025: Requiem
- 2025: Nagasaki: In the Shadow of the Flash
- 2025: The Hungry God
- 2025: One Last Throw – Tomoaki Kanemoto
- 2025: By 6 A.M.
- 2025: Suzuki=Bakudan – Hasebe
- 2025: Kaede
- 2026: Busshi – Ryunosuke
- 2026: Euthanasia Special Zone
- 2026: Kingdom 5: The Clash of Souls – Si Shi
- 2026: The Invisibles – Koyanagi
- 2026: The Living Dragon

=== Television ===
- 2002: Toshiie and Matsu – Asano Nagamasa
- 2005: Yoshitsune – Minamoto no Yoshitomo
- 2005: The Kindaichi Case Files – Isamu Kenmochi
- 2010: Clouds Over the Hill – Arima Ryōkitsu
- 2013: Yae's Sakura – Itagaki Taisuke
- 2018: Manpuku – Akira Kawakami
- 2018: Itsumademo Shiroi Hane
- 2019: Idaten – Yōtarō Sugimura
- 2021: The Grand Family – Ichinose
- 2022: DCU: Deep Crime Unit – Ichiro Kimi
- 2023: Ultraman Blazar – Retsu Haruno
- 2023: Fixer – Takumi Ujihara
- 2024: Like a Dragon: Yakuza – Dojima

=== Video games ===
- 2002: Maximo: Ghosts to Glory – Ghastly Gus, Captain Cadaver
- 2005: Romancing SaGa – Prince Neidhart, Cornelio
- 2006: Secret of Evangelion
- 2007: Secret of Evangelion Portable
- 2008: Ryū ga Gotoku Kenzan! – Yoshioka Seijuro
