= A Cheerful Gang Turns the Earth =

- Film poster
- Directed by: Tetsu Maeda
- Written by: Takashi Hasegawa; Tetsu Maeda; Kentaro Ushi
- Starring: Takao Osawa; Kyōka Suzuki; Shota Matsuda; Kōichi Satō; Arata Furuta
- Cinematography: Hideo Yamamoto
- Edited by: Mototaka Kusakabe
- Distributed by: Shochiku Company
- Release date: May 13, 2006
- Running time: 92 minutes
- Country: Japan
- Language: Japanese

A Cheerful Gang Turns the Earth (陽気なギャングが地球を回す, Yōki na Gyangu ga Chikyū o Mawasu) is a 2006 comedy heist film directed by Japanese director Tetsu Maeda, based on a novel by Kōtaro Isaka.

== Plot ==
The film is about a group of four people who form a gang to put romance back into bank robbery. The film is light-hearted in tone, and makes impressive use of CGI.

== Cast ==
Cast members include: Takao Osawa (as Naruse, boss and "human lie detector"), Kyōka Suzuki (as Yukiko, driver and "human clock"), Shota Matsuda (as Kuon, the pickpocket), Kōichi Satō (as Kyōno, the coffee shop owner), and Koji Okura (as Jimichi).

- Takao Osawa as Naruse
- Kyōka Suzuki as Yukiko
- Shota Matsuda as Kuon
- Kōichi Satō as Kyono
- Arata Furuta as Tanaka
- Ren Ohsugi as Kunimoto
- Suzuki Matsuo as Kamoda
- Ken Mitsuishi as Asakura
- Rosa Kato as Shoko
- Sakichi Sato
- Hoka Kinoshita as Hayashi
- Tomohiro Miura as Shinichi
- Yuichiro Nakayama as Akajima
- Koji Okura as Jimichi
- Eisuke Shinoi as Urushibara
- Ryo Iwamatsu
- Yasuhi Nakamura
- Shou Ohkura
- Takashi Okuda
- Kyisaku Shimada
- Kaori Sunaga
- Ellie Toyota
