= Yuki Yamada (actor) =

Japanese actor

- 山田 裕貴
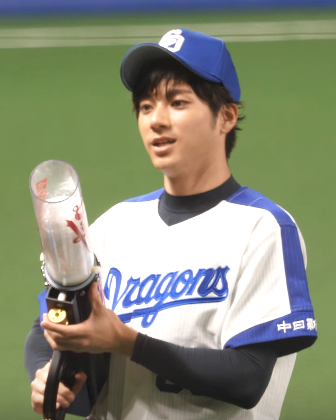
- Yamada in 2018
- Born: September 18, 1990 (age 36); Aichi Prefecture, Japan
- Occupation: Actor
- Years active: 2010–present
- Agent: Watanabe Entertainment
- Spouse: Nanase Nishino (m. 2024)

Yuki Yamada (山田 裕貴, Yamada Yūki; born September 18, 1990) is a Japanese actor. He is associated with Watanabe Entertainment's male acting troupe D-Boys since 2010 and made his acting debut in Kaizoku Sentai Gokaiger (2011). Notable works he has starred in include the High&Low TV and film franchise (2015-2019), Strobe Edge (2015), Tokyo Revengers (2021) and Godzilla Minus One (2023).

== Career ==
In 2010, Yamada applied for the D-Boys Special Unit Audition, an audition for the fifth member of D-Boys' boy band, D-Date. In August 2010, he was revealed as one of seven finalists on D-Boys' variety show, D-Boys Be Ambitious. Despite not winning a spot in D-Date, Yamada won the Grand Prix award in the audition and was selected to join D-Boys' D2 division. In 2011, he made his acting debut as Joe Gibken in Kaizoku Sentai Gokaiger

On May 28, 2012, Yamada announced on his blog that he has been cast on manga adaption drama GTO in the role of Koji Fujiyoshi.

In 2014, Yamada landed a leading role for the first time in the movie Live directed by Noboru Iguchi. In the same year, Yamada was also cast as Tadaomy Ando in the movie Gachiban: Ultra Max. He reprised his role in Gachiban: New Generation 2 the following year.

In 2017, Yamada made his Taiga drama acting debut in Naotora: The Lady Warlord. In addition, he also made an appearance in 14 movies within the same year. With diversity and range of roles he has taken, he became known as "Chameleon Actor".

In 2020, he won the New Wave Award (actor category) at the Yubari International Fantastic Film Festival 2020.

In February 2022, he received the Elan d'or Awards in Newcomer of the Year category, which is given to promising actors. In July, he won first place of the women's fashion magazine "ViVi"'s popularity voting project "National Treasure Handsome Men Ranking for the First Half of 2022" in the adult category. He proceeded to win in the same category in second Half of 2022, receiving the highest ranking, and was inducted into the Hall of Fame.

In November 2023, he won the Breakthrough Actor category in GQ Japan's Men of the Year 2023. In December, he won the Yahoo! Japan Search Award 2023, ranking first in the Actor category.

== Personal life ==
His father was former professional baseball player Kazutoshi Yamada. Yamada played baseball in elementary and middle school, but decided to quit when entering high school.

On March 31, 2024, he announced his marriage to actress Nanase Nishino.

== Filmography ==
=== Television ===
Year	Title	Role	Other notes	Ref.
2011–12	Kaizoku Sentai Gokaiger	Joe Gibken/Gokai Blue		
2012	D × TOWN 3rd "Why we can not be love	Kenji Miyamoto	Lead role	
2012	GTO	Koji Fujiyoshi		
2013	Mischievous Kiss: Love in Tokyo	Kinnosuke Ikezawa		
2013	Starman -Sutaman-Kono Hoshi no Koi	Ando		
2014	Mischievous Kiss: Love in Tokyo 2	Kinnosuke Ikezawa		
2014	Testimony of N	Mizoguchi	Episodes 4-5	
2015	The Concierge	Kotarou Konno		
2015	Odora Daisenden Kaigi Season 2	Kazuya Niimi		
2015	High＆Low: The Story of S.W.O.R.D.	Yoshiki Murayama		
2016	Arechi no Koi	Tadao Kayama		
2016	Wine, Dine and Woo Me Season 2	Yamato Ogasawara	Episode 2	
2016	Doubutsu Sentai Zyuohger	Joe Gibken/Gokai Blue	Episodes 28-29	
2016	High&Low Season 2	Yoshiki Murayama		
2016	Juken no Cinderella	Yuya Okita		
2016	Death Cash	Satoshi Miura		
2016	The Woman of S.R.I. Season 16	Naoto Iimura	Episode 4	
2016	Cabasuka Gakuen	Hirose Ueno	Episodes 4-5	
2017	Naotora: The Lady Warlord	Ihara Tomomasa	Taiga drama	
2017	Tomodachi Game	Tenji Mikasa		
2017	Gaki☆Rock ~The Story of Kindness in Asakusa~	Ryuta Kaneyama		
2017	Three Dads	Kyohei Hanoi		
2017	Fugitive Boys	Reimu Harano		
2017	The Many Faces of Ito	Okita		
2018	Holiday Love	Yoshinobu Kuroi		
2018	Miss Sherlock	Yuichi Takayama	Episode 6	
2018	Caseworker's Diary	Ryuichi Shichijo		
2018–21	Tokusou Nine	Ryo Shindo	4 seasons	
2019	Innocence: Enzai Bengoshi	Takeo Tokachi	Episode 2	
2019	Dai Zenryoku Shissou	Masaya Shirogane		
2019	Natsuzora: Natsu's Sky	Yukijirō	Asadora	
2019	High & Low The Worst Episode .0	Yoshiki Murayama		
2020	Sedai Wars	Satoru Kashiwagi	Lead role	
2020	Homeroom	Rintaro Aida	Lead role	
2020	Equation to Erase the Teacher	Asahi Yorita		
2020	Yorita Asahi's Equation	Asahi Yorita	Lead role	
2021	School Police	Hitoki Saegusa		
2021	Koko wa Ima kara Rinri Desu	Takayangi	Lead role	
2021	Police in a Pod	Takeshi Yamada		
2021	Shimura Ken to Drif no Daibakushō Monogatari	Ken Shimura	Lead role; TV movie	
2022	Chimudondon	Hiro'o Ishikawa	Asadora	
2023	Themis's Law School Classroom	Jin Aoi		
2023	What Will You Do, Ieyasu?	Honda Tadakatsu	Taiga drama	
2023	Pending Train	Naoya Kayashima	Lead role	
2024	The Gift of Your Heart	Taiyo Asano		
2026	Song of the Samurai	Hijikata Toshizō	Lead role	
2026	Gift	Ryo Miyashita		

=== Film ===
Year	Title	Role	Other notes	Ref.
2011	Tensou Sentai Goseiger vs. Shinkenger: Epic on Ginmaku	Gokai Blue (voice)		
2011	Gokaiger Goseiger Super Sentai 199 Hero Great Battle	Joe Gibken/Gokai Blue		
2011	Kaizoku Sentai Gokaiger the Movie: The Flying Ghost Ship	Joe Gibken/Gokai Blue		
2012	Kaizoku Sentai Gokaiger vs. Space Sheriff Gavan: The Movie	Joe Gibken/Gokai Blue		
2012	Kamen Rider × Super Sentai: Super Hero Taisen	Joe Gibken/Gokai Blue, Geki Red (voice only)		
2013	Tokumei Sentai Go-Busters vs. Kaizoku Sentai Gokaiger: The Movie	Joe Gibken/Gokai Blue		
2014	Me & 23 Slaves	Ataru Chūō		
2014	Gachiban: Ultra Max	Tadaomy Ando		
2014	Live	Naoto Tamura	Lead role	
2014	Hot Road	Kinpa		
2015	Gachiban: New Generation 2	Tadaomy Ando		
2015	Strobe Edge	Takumi Ando		
2015	Stray Dogs	Tadaomy Ando	Lead role	
2016	Kako: My Sullen Past	Hisashi		
2016	Road to High & Low	Yoshiki Murayama		
2016	High & Low: The Movie	Yoshiki Murayama		
2016	Wolf Girl and Black Prince	Nanpa boy		
2016	Yell for the Blue Sky	Kota Usui		
2016	Ushijima the Loan Shark Part 3	Makoto Kiyosaka		
2016	Stray Dogz 3	Tadaomy Ando		
2016	My Tomorrow, Your Yesterday	Hayashi		
2017	Zou wo Naderu	Morikawa		
2017	Stray Dogz 5	Tadaomy Ando		
2017	Hurricane Polymar	Joichi Kuruma		
2017	Friends Game: The Movie	Tenji Mikasa		
2017	Stray Dogz 6	Tadaomy Ando		
2017	High&Low The Movie 2 / End of Sky	Yoshiki Murayama		
2017	Friends Game: The Movie Final	Tenji Mikasa		
2017	Second Summer, Never See You Again	Rokuro Ishida		
2017	Stray Dogz 7	Tadaomy Ando		
2017	Ajin: Demi-Human	Takahashi		
2017	Wilderness: Part One	Yūji		
2017	Wilderness: Part Two	Yūji		
2017	High&Low The Movie 3 / Final Mission	Yoshiki Murayama		
2017	Demekin	Atsunari		
2018	Stray Dogz 8	Tadaomy Ando	Lead role	
2018	My Little Monster	Kenji Yamaguchi		
2018	Stray Dogz 9	Tadaomy Ando		
2018	Shoplifters	Yasu Hojo		
2018	Rainbow Days	Masaomi Tsutsui		
2018	My Teacher, My Love		Cameo	
2018	You Are the Apple of My Eye	Kōsuke Mizushima	Lead role	
2019	High&Low The Worst	Yoshiki Murayama		
2020	We Make Antiques! Kyoto Rendezvous	Keita Makino		
2020	Crayon Shin-chan: Crash! Rakuga Kingdom and Almost Four Heroes	The Minister of Defense (voice)		
2021	Kaizoku Sentai: Ten Gokaiger	Joe Gibken/Gokai Blue		
2021	Tokyo Revengers	Ken "Draken" Ryūgūji		
2021	Jump!! The Heroes Behind the Gold	Ryūji Takahashi		
2021	Baragaki: Unbroken Samurai	Tokugawa Yoshinobu		
2021	Hula Fulla Dance	Kazuto Taira (voice)		
2021	The Crocodile That Lived for 100 Days	Frog (voice)		
2022	The Last 10 Years	Takeru Tomita		
2022	Fullmetal Alchemist: The Revenge of Scar	Solf J. Kimblee		
2022	Nighttime Warbles	Shin'ichi	Lead role	
2022	Whisper of the Heart	25-year-old Sugimura		
2022	One Piece Film: Red	Eboshi (voice)		
2022	Black Night Parade	Tōma Hino		
2023	Blue Giant	Dai Miyamoto (voice)	Lead role	
2023	Tokyo Revengers 2: Bloody Halloween Part 1	Ken "Draken" Ryūgūji		
2023	Tokyo Revengers 2: Bloody Halloween Part 2	Ken "Draken" Ryūgūji		
2023	Kingdom 3: The Flame of Destiny	Wan Ji		
2023	Godzilla Minus One	Shiro Mizushima		
2024	Kingdom 4: Return of the Great General	Wan Ji		
2025	Army on the Tree	Seijun Agena	Lead role	
2025	Suzuki=Bakudan	Ruike	Lead role	
2025	Beethoven Fabrication	Anton Schindler	Lead role	
2026	Kingdom 5: The Clash of Souls	Wan Ji		
2026	Godzilla Minus Zero	Shiro Mizushima		
2027	Super Mob Ninja	Akira Higashino	Lead role	

=== Japanese dub ===
Year	Title	Role	Notes	Ref.
2024	Ultraman: Rising	Ken Sato/Ultraman		
2024	Joker: Folie à Deux	Harvey Dent		

== Awards and nominations ==
Year	Award	Category	Work(s)	Result	Ref.
2021	34th Nikkan Sports Film Awards	Best Supporting Actor	Tokyo Revengers and the others	Nominated	
2021	46th Hochi Film Awards	Best Supporting Actor	Tokyo Revengers and the others	Nominated	
2022	46th Elan d'or Awards	Newcomer of the Year	Himself	Won	
2023	GQ Japan's Men of the Year 2023	Breakthrough Actor	Himself	Won	
2025	38th Nikkan Sports Film Awards	Best Actor	Army on the Tree, Beethoven Fabrication and Suzuki=Bakudan	Nominated	
2026	68th Blue Ribbon Awards	Best Actor	Suzuki=Bakudan	Nominated	
2026	49th Japan Academy Film Prize	Best Actor	Suzuki=Bakudan	Nominated	
