= Eri Murakawa =

Japanese actress

- Born: October 4, 1987 (age 38); Daitō, Osaka, Japan
- Years active: 2002–present
- Agent: Amuse, Inc.

Eri Murakawa (村川 絵梨, Murakawa Eri; born 4 October 1987) is a Japanese actress associated with Amuse, Inc. She attended Omiya Junior High School and Hinode High School.

== Filmography ==
=== Television ===
- Kaze no Haruka (2005)
- My Boss My Hero (2006)
- Sexy Voice and Robo (2007)
- Good Job (2007)
- Rookies (2008)
- Detective Yuri Rintaro (2020), Yumi Nagoshi
- Reach Beyond the Blue Sky (2021), Shibusawa Naka
- Zaibatsu Fukushū (2025), Saori Matsushima
- Tokyo Holiday (2025), Kaede Watarai

=== Movies ===
- Load 88 (2004)
- Koibumi (2004)
- Little DJ (2007)
- We Can't Change the World. But, We Wanna Build a School in Cambodia. (2011)
- A Flower Aflame (2016)
- Birds Without Names (2017)
- Coming Home (2020)
- Sabakan / Summer Days 1986 (2022)
- Kingdom 3: The Flame of Destiny (2023), You Li
- Kingdom 4: Return of the Great General (2024), You Li
- Kaneko's Commissary (2025), Shiori Tokuyama
- Bring Him Down to a Portable Size (2025)
