= A Samurai in Time =

2024 film by Jun'ichi Yasuda

- Theatrical release poster
- Japanese: 侍タイムスリッパー
- Directed by: Jun'ichi Yasuda
- Screenplay by: Jun'ichi Yasuda
- Starring: Makiya Yamaguchi; Norimasa Fuke; Yuno Sakura; Rantaro Mine
- Cinematography: Jun'ichi Yasuda
- Edited by: Jun'ichi Yasuda
- Production company: Mirai Eiga-sha
- Distributed by: Mirai Eiga-sha
- Release date: August 17, 2024 (Japan)
- Running time: 131 minutes
- Country: Japan
- Language: Japanese
- Budget: ¥26 million
- Box office: ¥1 billion

A Samurai in Time (Japanese: 侍タイムスリッパー, Hepburn: Samurai Taimu Surippā) is a 2024 Japanese fantasy comedy film directed by Jun'ichi Yasuda. it is a low-budget independent film produced for 26 million yen. Initially, it was shown in only one theater, but it gained popularity through word-of-mouth and expanded to more theaters. The media called it a "surprise hit reminiscent of One Cut of the Dead (2017)."

== Plot ==
Kosaka Shinzaemon, an Aizu samurai lived in Edo era, was struck by lightning and inexplicably transported to 2007 Japan. He found work as a kirareyaku (a stunt performer specializing in being 'cut down' in jidaigeki) and became successful. Then, to his surprise, he received a major role offer from movie star Kyoichiro Kazami.

== Cast ==
- Makiya Yamaguchi as Kosaka Shinzaemon, a samurai of the Aizu Domain
- Norimasa Fuke as Kyoichiro Kazami, a movie star. His real name is Yamagata Hikokuro
  - Ken Shonozaki as young Yamagata Hikokuro, a samurai of the Chōshū Domain
- Yuno Sakura as Yuko Yamamoto, an assistant director
- Rantaro Mine as Sekimoto, a sword fighting instructor
- Tsutomu Tamura as Kyotaro Nishiki, a star actor of Jidaiigeki
- Yoshiharu Fukuda as the chief priest
- Manko Kurenai as Setsuko
- Hajime Inoue as Inoue, a studio director
- Akinori Ando as Ando, an actor

== Production ==
Director Jun'ichi Yasuda poured his own personal fortune into the production of this film. Yuno Sakura, who appears in the film as an assistant director, also served as the actual assistant director. Makiya Yamaguchi, who played the lead role, is an actor with a long career, but this was his first time starring in a film. Seizo Fukumoto was initially cast for the role of Sekimoto, but due to his passing, Rantaro Mine, Fukumoto's junior, was cast instead.

== Awards and nominations ==
Award	Category	Recipient(s)	Result	Ref.
37th Nikkan Sports Film Awards	Best Film	A Samurai in Time	Won	
37th Nikkan Sports Film Awards	Yūjirō Ishihara Award	A Samurai in Time	Nominated	
37th Nikkan Sports Film Awards	Best Director	Jun'ichi Yasuda	Won	
37th Nikkan Sports Film Awards	Best Actor	Makiya Yamaguchi	Won	
67th Blue Ribbon Awards	Best Film	A Samurai in Time	Won	
67th Blue Ribbon Awards	Best Director	Jun'ichi Yasuda	Nominated	
67th Blue Ribbon Awards	Best Actor	Makiya Yamaguchi	Won	
48th Japan Academy Film Prize	Best Film	A Samurai in Time	Won	
48th Japan Academy Film Prize	Best Director	Jun'ichi Yasuda	Nominated	
48th Japan Academy Film Prize	Best Screenplay	Jun'ichi Yasuda	Nominated	
48th Japan Academy Film Prize	Best Film Editing	Jun'ichi Yasuda	Won	
48th Japan Academy Film Prize	Best Cinematography	Jun'ichi Yasuda	Nominated	
48th Japan Academy Film Prize	Best Actor	Makiya Yamaguchi	Nominated	
48th Japan Academy Film Prize	Best Lighting Direction	Kin'ya Doi, Hiroshi Hano and Jun'ichi Yasuda	Nominated	
25th Nippon Connection	Nippon Cinema Award	A Samurai in Time	Won	
