= Takao Osawa =

Japanese actor

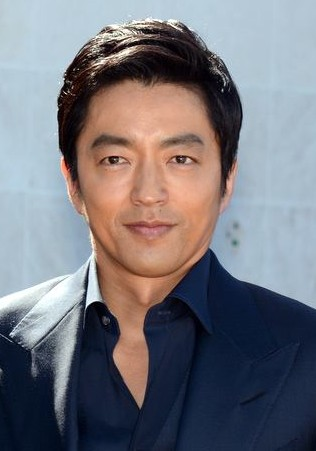
- Osawa at the 2013 Cannes Film Festival.
- Born: March 11, 1968 (age 58); Tokyo, Japan
- Occupations: Actor, model, producer
- Years active: 1987–present
- Website: www.osawatakao.jp

Takao Osawa (Japanese: 大沢 たかお, Hepburn: Ōsawa Takao; born March 11, 1968) is a Japanese actor.

== Career ==
Osawa starred in the 2002 film Filament and the 2007 film Midnight Eagle. He has also appeared in films such as Masayuki Suo's A Terminal Trust and Takashi Miike's Shield of Straw.

The Newport Beach Film Festival in Newport Beach, CA, screened Osawa's film Wolf Children on April 27, 2013. In 2018, he played the Kralahome in the West End revival of The King and I.

== Filmography ==
=== Film ===
Year	Title	Role	Notes	Ref.
1995	I Want to Love You in a Way That'll Melt the Ski Slopes	Masaru Shigure		
1996	Two Punks	Yoichi Fujikawa	Lead role	
1999	The Island Tales	Haruki Fukuyama		
1999	Sennen Tabito	Togashi		
2001	All About Lily Chou-Chou	Takao Tabito		
2002	Jam Films	Mathematician	Lead role, segment "Cold Sleep"	
2002	Filament	Kyota Sawada		
2003	Aragami	The Samurai	Lead role	
2003	The Battling Angel	Kazumasa Furuyoshi	Lead role	
2003	Hana	Yoichiro Nozaki	Lead role	
2003	Sky High	Tatsuya Kudo		
2004	Milk White	Takayuki Takano	Lead role	
2004	Hana and Alice	Ryo Taguchi		
2004	Crying Out Love in the Center of the World	Sakutaro Matsumoto	Lead role	
2005	Into the Sun	Kuroda		
2006	Helen the Baby Fox	Koji Yajima	Lead role	
2006	A Cheerful Gang Turns the Earth	Naruse	Lead role	
2006	Riding the Metro	Sakichi Konuma		
2006	Christmas on July 24th Avenue	Satoshi Okuda		
2006	Bizan	Dr. Daisuke Terasawa		
2007	Life: Tears in Heaven	Natsuki Iijima	Lead role	
2007	Midnight Eagle	Yuji Nishizaki	Lead role	
2008	The Taste of Fish	Shuntaro Akagi	Lead role	
2008	Ichi	Toma Fujihira		
2008	Love Fight	Joe Oki		
2009	Halfway	Hirabayashi		
2009	Goemon	Kirigakure Saizō		
2009	Ballad: Nameless Love Song	Takatora Okurai		
2010	Flowers	Hiroshi Manaka		
2010	The Sakurada Gate Incident	Tetsunosuke Seki	Lead role	
2012	Wolf Children Ame and Yuki	Ookami (voice)	Animated film	
2012	A Terminal Trust	The prosecutor		
2013	Strawberry Night	Isao Makita		
2013	Shield of Straw	Kazuki Mekari		
2014	Kano	Yoichi Hatta	Taiwanese film	
2015	The Lion Standing in the Wind	Koichiro Shimada	Lead role	
2018	Wish You Were Here	Tomiya	Chinese film	
2019	Kingdom	Wang Qi		
2020	AI Amok	Kiryū	Lead role	
2021	The Great Yokai War: Guardians	Inugami Gyōbu		
2022	Kingdom 2: Far and Away	Wang Qi		
2023	Kingdom 3: The Flame of Destiny	Wang Qi		
2023	The Silent Service	Shiro Kaieda	Lead role; also producer	
2024	Kingdom 4: Return of the Great General	Wang Qi		
2025	The Silent Service: Battle of the Arctic Ocean	Shiro Kaieda	Lead role; also producer	
2025	The Smashing Machine	Nobuyuki Sakakibara	American film	
2026	The Keeper of the Camphor Tree	Toshiaki Saji (voice)	Animated film	

=== Television ===
Year	Title	Role	Notes	Ref.
1994	Kimi to Ita Natsu	Ryoichi Aizawa		
1994	Wakamono no Subete	Shinsuke Yamazaki		
1994	Hana no Ran	Ashikaga Yoshitane	Taiga drama	
1995	Kamisan no Waruguchi 2	Satoshi Mikami		
1995–96	Heaven's Coin	Shuichi Nagai	2 seasons	
1996	Gekiteki Kiko: Shinya Tokkyu	Koutaro Sawaki		
1996	Only You: Aisarete	Sumio Ozaki		
1996	Rennai Zenya Ichidodake: Shoya no Asa			
1997	Dessin	Satoshi Asakura		
1998	Seikimatsu no Uta/The Last Song	Mysterious Man		
1999	Utsukushii Hito	Jiro Murasame		
2000	Another Heaven	Goro Minazuki		
2000	Worst Contact	Takimoto		
2000	Hyaku-nen no Monogatari	Kazuo Hirose		
2001	Ex-Lover / Mukashi no Otoko	Arashi Ikeda		
2003	Ore wa Iwashi	Wang	TV movie	
2006	Tokyo Wonder Tours	Himself		
2009–11	Jin	Jin Minakata	Lead role; 2 seasons	
2013	Fiery Enmity: Hero of the North	Aterui	Lead role	
2013	Galileo	Shikō Renzaki	Episode 1, Season 2	
2015	Burning Flower	Katori Tomohiko	Taiga drama	
2019	Ōoku the Final	Tokugawa Yoshimune	Television film	
2023	One Day: Wonderful Christmas Ado	Tokio Tachiaoi	Lead role	
2024–27	The Silent Service	Shiro Kaieda	Lead role; also producer; 2 seasons	
2027	The Shogunate Rebel	Katsu Kaishū	Taiga drama	

=== Video games ===
- Professor Layton and the Diabolical Box (2007) as Anton Herzen (voice)

== Awards and nominations ==
Year	Award	Category	Nominated work	Result	Ref.
2005	28th Japan Academy Film Prize	Best Actor	Milk White	Nominated	
2006	19th Nikkan Sports Film Awards	Best Supporting Actor	Riding the Metro and Christmas on July 24th Avenue	Won	
2007	30th Japan Academy Film Prize	Best Supporting Actor	Riding the Metro	Nominated	
2010	3rd Tokyo Drama Awards	Best Actor	Jin	Won	
2025	67th Blue Ribbon Awards	Best Supporting Actor	Kingdom 4: Return of the Great General	Won	
2025	48th Japan Academy Film Prize	Best Supporting Actor	Kingdom 4: Return of the Great General	Won	
