= Masahiro Takashima =

Japanese actor and singer (born 1965)

- Born: October 29, 1965 (age 60); Tokyo, Japan
- Occupations: Actor; Singer
- Years active: 1987–present
- Spouse: Sylvia Grab (m. 2005)
- Parents: Tadao Takashima (father); Hanayo Sumi (mother)
- Relatives: Masanobu Takashima (brother)

Masahiro Takashima (髙嶋 政宏, Takashima Masahiro; born October 29, 1965, Tokyo) is a Japanese actor and singer.

== Early life ==
Takashima comes from a family of actors, including his father Tadao Takashima, his mother Hanayo Sumi, and his younger brother Masanobu Takashima.

== Career ==
=== Acting ===
Takashima debuted in the 1987 film Totto Channel, directed by Kazuki Ōmori. His part as Tsuda in Busu that same year earned him the Japan Academy Prize for Newcomer of the Year, as well as the Blue Ribbon Award, Hochi Film Award, Kinema Junpo Award, and the Mainichi Film Award for Best New Actor in 1988. Since that time he has appeared in feature films, including Gunhed, Legend of Zipang (1990), Godzilla vs. Mechagodzilla II, Godzilla vs. Destoroyah, and Kakushi Toride no San-Akunin: The Last Princess, and The Climbers High. He appeared in the television crime drama Sangaku kyûjotai Shimon Ikki.

=== Singing ===
As a singer, Takashima released singles and albums from 1992 to 1994. He covered the King Crimson song Starless on the B side of his 1993 single Kowarerukurai Dakishimetai (こわれるくらい抱きしめたい). On Rock Fujiyama, he was nicknamed Starless Takashima (スターレス髙嶋) because he was a King Crimson enthusiast.

== Personal life ==
Takashima married stage actress Sylvia Grab in 2005.

Takashima's has expressed a love for rock music, especially progressive rock. He is a fan of Kiss, and admitted in an interview with the Japanese weekly magazine Flash, that the first concert he attended was a Kiss show at Nippon Budokan in 1978. Takashima appeared on the Japanese music show Rock Fujiyama in 2006 and 2007, speaking about his favorite English band King Crimson, stating that he had attended live concerts of the following groups: King Crimson, Michael Schenker Group, Yes and AC/DC. Takashima was asked to write the liner notes for King Crimson's compilation album The Condensed 21st Century Guide to King Crimson after his first appearance on Rock Fujiyama.

Takashima professes to enjoy the music of Grand Funk Railroad, Thin Lizzy, and the Sex Pistols. Takashima surprised Kiss enthusiast Marty Friedman of Megadeth when he showed rare Kiss memorabilia on Rock Fujiyama.

== Filmography ==
=== Films ===
- Gunhed (1989)
- Zipang (1990)
- Godzilla vs. Mechagodzilla II (1993)
- Orochi, the Eight-Headed Dragon (1994)
- Godzilla vs. Destoroyah (1995)
- Lady Maiko (2014)
- Zakurozaka no Adauchi (2014), Shinnosuke Naitō
- Nobunaga Concerto (2016), Shibata Katsuie
- Gold Medal Man (2016)
- Honnō-ji Hotel (2017), Akechi Mitsuhide
- Kingdom (2019), Lord Changwen
- Masquerade Hotel (2019), Furuhashi
- Aircraft Carrier Ibuki (2019), Takanobu Taki
- Three Nobunagas (2019), Kanbara Ujinori
- Kaguya-sama: Love Is War (2019)
- AI Amok (2020)
- Grand Blue (2020), Toshio Kotegawa
- Keep Your Hands Off Eizouken! (2020), Fujimoto
- Baragaki: Unbroken Samurai (2021), Kiyokawa Hachirō
- Dreams on Fire (2021)
- Kaguya-sama Final: Love Is War (2021)
- The Confidence Man JP: Episode of the Hero (2022)
- Radiation House: The Movie (2022), Masato Haijima
- Baseball Club Rhapsody (2022), coach Harada
- Kingdom 2: Far and Away (2022), Lord Changwen
- Safe Word (2022)
- Kingdom 3: The Flame of Destiny (2023), Lord Changwen
- What If Shogun Ieyasu Tokugawa Was to Become the Prime Minister (2024), Tokugawa Yoshimune
- Kingdom 4: Return of the Great General (2024), Lord Changwen
- The Scoop (2024), Eisaku Numahara
- Gosh!! (2025)
- Sham (2025), Domae
- Kingdom 5: The Clash of Souls (2026), Lord Changwen
- The Tiger and Her Wings: The Movie (2027), Konosuke Okawara

=== Television ===
- Dokuganryū Masamune (1987), Katakura Shigenaga
- Mōri Motonari (1997), Amago Haruhisa
- Toshiie and Matsu (2002), Tokugawa Ieyasu
- Yae's Sakura (2013), Makimura Masanao
- Nobunaga Concerto (2014), Shibata Katsuie
- Prison School (2015), Chairman Kurihara
- Naotora: The Lady Warlord (2017), Honda Tadakatsu
- Yū-san no Nyōbō (2021), Toshiro Mifune
- Nakamura Nakazo: Shusse no Kizahashi (2021)
- Radiation House (2021), Masato Haijima
- Galápagos (2023), Mori
- Chihayafuru: Full Circle (2025), the principal
- The Scent of the Wind (2026), Ōyama Iwao
- Human Vapor (2026), Director Golo

=== Dubbing ===
- Zootopia 2, Mayor Brian Winddancer
