= AI Amok =

- Theatrical release poster
- Directed by: Yu Irie
- Written by: Yu Irie
- Produced by: Naoaki Kitajima
- Starring: Takao Osawa; Kento Kaku; Alice Hirose; Takanori Iwata; Masahiro Takashima; Sei Ashina; Tina Tamashiro; Kimiko Yo; Nanako Matsushima; Tomokazu Miura
- Cinematography: Shoichi Ato
- Edited by: Tsuyoshi Imai
- Music by: Masaru Yokoyama
- Production company: CREDEUS
- Distributed by: Warner Bros. Pictures
- Release date: 31 January 2020
- Running time: 131 minutes
- Country: Japan
- Language: Japanese

AI Amok (Japanese: AI崩壊, romanized: AI hōkai) is a 2020 Japanese science fiction thriller film directed by Yu Irie, starring Takao Osawa, Kento Kaku, Alice Hirose, Takanori Iwata, Masahiro Takashima, Sei Ashina, Tina Tamashiro, Kimiko Yo, Nanako Matsushima and Tomokazu Miura.

== Cast ==
- Takao Osawa as Kosuke Kiryu
- Kento Kaku as Satoshi Nishimura
- Alice Hirose as Kumi Okuse
- Takanori Iwata as Makoto Sakuraba
- Masahiro Takashima
- Sei Ashina as Maika Hayashibara
- Tina Tamashiro as Mako Iida
- Kimiko Yo as Eiko Tanaka
- Nanako Matsushima as Shota Hashimoto
- Tomokazu Miura as Kyoichi Goda
- Yoshi Sakou as Kensaku Kishi
- Sora Tamaki as Kokoro Kiryu
- Nomaguchi Toru as Kengo Maekawa
- Magy as Hiroshi Okawara
- Daisuke Kuroda as Kengo Maekawa
- Katsuya Maiguma as Hideto Kominaga
- Maski Naito as Extremist
- Yukijirō Hotaru as Fisherman
- Risa Kameda as Ikeda
- Hiroko Terada

== Reception ==
Tay Yek Keak of Today rated the film 3 stars out of 5 and wrote, "This is a too-even, too-predictable flick crying out for a better ‘gotcha!’ ending than the one it thinks we'd be surprised by. It's still something that's pretty okay to see, but nope, there's no mind-blowing shock here."

Marcus Goh of Yahoo! Life gave the film a score of 3/5 and wrote that while it "tries its best to make you think about the subject matter, and it does have some interesting bits", it "ends up being bogged down by a horrific second Act, which completely deflates any tension that might have been generated in Act One."

James Hadfield of The Japan Times rated the film 2.5 stars out of 5 and wrote that the film is "as cerebral as a conversation with a Pepper robot, but if you’re looking for an uncomplicated diversion, you could do far worse."

Film critic Atsuko Kawaguchi rated the film 2 stars out of 5.
