= Yasuhisa Hara =

Japanese manga artist (born 1975)

Yasuhisa Hara 原 泰久
- Born: June 9, 1975 (age 51); Kiyama, Saga Prefecture, Japan
- Education: Kyushu Institute of Design
- Occupation: Manga artist
- Spouse: Unnamed wife (m. 2006; div. 2020)
- Children: 3
- Writing career
- Years active: 1999–present
- Notable work: Kingdom
- Notable awards: Grand Prize at 17th Tezuka Osamu Cultural Prize

Yasuhisa Hara (Japanese: 原 泰久, Hepburn: Hara Yasuhisa; born June 9, 1975) is a Japanese manga artist and the creator of the series Kingdom.

With more than 100 million tankōbon copies in circulation worldwide, Kingdom is one of the best-selling manga in history. In 2013, Hara won the Grand Prize of the 17th Tezuka Osamu Cultural Prize for his work on Kingdom.

== Early life ==
Hara was born in the town of Kiyama in Saga Prefecture and attended Tomeikan High School. He would later be appointed first ambassador of his hometown.

Hara then enrolled at Kyushu Institute of Design where he graduated with a Bachelor's degree in 1998 and a Master's degree in 2000. He enrolled at the university with the intention of becoming a film director but learnt it was difficult to make a living in the film industry. In this third year at university, he decided to become a manga artist because he could do everything by himself such as directing, writing scripts and drawing.

During his time at university, Hara had drawn a lot of storyboards but never drawn manga. In 1997, he submitted his first work, Ueda-kun's Theory of Degeneration which won the Anticipation Award in the 36th edition of Young Magazine's Tetsuya Chiba Awards. In 1999, his work Ousamatsu won the runner-up grand prize at the 40th Tetsuya Chiba Awards He was assigned to an editor at Young Magazine where several of his one-shot stories were published but were never brought up at serialization meetings. At that point Hara gave up becoming a manga artist.

== Career ==
In 2000, Hara took a job at Fujitsu as a systems engineer where he worked for three years. During his time there, he gained experience on how teams worked as well as the difficulties encountered such as when his senior left the company and had to cover for him. He ended up losing money for the company but his bosses and seniors protected him. According to Hara, his time working there was crucial to developing Kingdom.

Around this time, he became captivated by Records of the Grand Historian which he had started reading for his studies. This was the origin of the creation of Kingdom.

In 2003, Hara won the Encouragement Award at the 23rd Young Jump MANGA Grand Prix for his one-shot manga, Ha to Sen.

In 2005, Hara joined Weekly Young Jump as a manga artist to create the series, Kingdom. For several months he worked as an assistant to Takehiko Inoue which according to Hara was a very valuable experience.

In 2006, Kingdom started serializing in Weekly Young Jump. Initially the series struggled to gain popularity and was at the risk of getting cancelled. Hara asked Inoue for advice to which Inoue stated "The story is interesting, it's just that Shin's eyes are too small". With only a few words from Inoue, Hara realized that his work up to then had more emphasis on story rather than illustrations and adjusted the art style of Kingdom.

In 2012, Kingdom became the Guinness World Record Holder for the "Manga Written by the Most People." A total of 1,087 people participated in the campaign to redraw the 26th volume of Kingdom. Notable manga artists who participated include Inoue, Eiichiro Oda, Masashi Kishimoto and Hirohiko Araki.

In 2013, Hara won the Grand Prize of the 17th Tezuka Osamu Cultural Prize for his work on Kingdom.

In November 2023, with the release of its 70th volume, Kingdom surpassed 100 million copies printed.

== Personal life ==
Hara was married in 2006 and has three children. In August 2020, Ruriko Kojima said on a radio show that she was currently in a relationship with Hara. In September 2020, he released a statement on Twitter confirming he had divorced in March that year and that he had committed adultery. In July 2021, Kojima revealed they had broken up.

On August 15, 2019, Hara attended a roundtable discussion with Game of Thrones showrunners David Benioff and D. B. Weiss. He revealed he had been following the show since its fourth season. In the 2019 live action film of Kingdom, Hara insisted that Chengjiao draw inspiration from Joffrey Baratheon.

== Awards ==
- 1997: Anticipation Award for Ueda-kun's Theory of Degeneration at 36th Tetsuya Chiba Awards
- 1999: Runner-up grand prize for Ousamatsu at 40th Tetsuya Chiba Awards
- 2003: Encouragement Award for Ha to Sen at the 23rd Young Jump MANGA Grand Prix
- 2013: Grand prize for Kingdom at the 17th Tezuka Osamu Cultural Prize
- 2017: Grand prize for Kingdom at the 1st Tsutaya Comic Awards

== Works ==
=== Manga ===
==== One-shot ====
- Otomatsu (1999)
- Senshiki (2001)

==== Kingdom ====
- Kingdom (2006–present)
- Kingdom Highlights Volume 1 (2012)
  - Kongo (2003)
  - Horse and Liquor for 300 Soldiers (2004)
- Kingdom Highlights Volume 2 (2012)
  - Li Mu (2004)
  - Meng Wu and Chu Zi (2005)

=== Live action films ===
- Kingdom (2019) – screenplay
- Kingdom 2: Far and Away (2022) – screenplay
- Kingdom 3: The Flame of Destiny (2023) – screenplay
- Kingdom 4: Return of the Great General (2024) – screenplay
