= Shinnosuke Mitsushima =

Japanese actor (born 1989)

- 満島 真之介
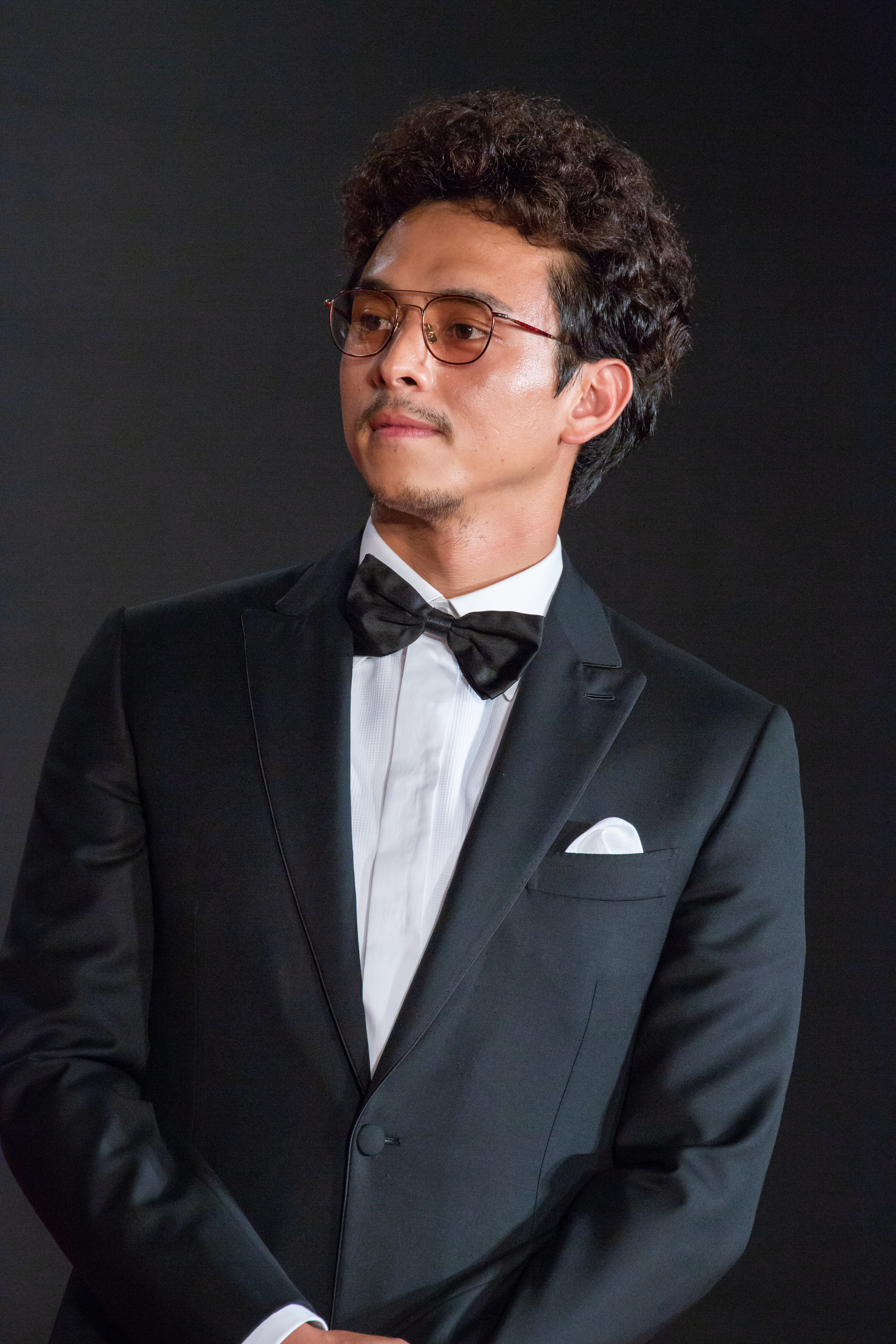
- Mitsushima in 2019
- Born: 30 May 1989 (age 37); Okinawa Prefecture, Japan
- Occupation: Actor
- Years active: 2010–present
- Agent: Veleta 104
- Notable work: 11:25 The Day He Chose His Own Fate
- Television: Hanazakari no Kimitachi e; Umechan Sensei; Renai Jidai
- Relatives: Hikari Mitsushima (older sister); Minami Mitsushima (younger sister); Kotaro Mitsushima (brother)
- Website: veleta104.com

Shinnosuke Mitsushima (満島 真之介, Mitsushima Shinnosuke; born 30 May 1989) is a Japanese actor. He graduated from Okinawa Prefecture Koza High School. He is represented with Veleta 104.

Mitsushima's older sister is former Folder and Folder 5 member turned actress Hikari Mitsushima. His younger sister is model Minami Mitsushima. Mitsushima's younger brother is Kotaro Mitsushima, a basketball player for Rizing Zephyr Fukuoka of the Japan Basketball League.

== Biography ==
He was born in the Okinawa prefecture, and is a quarter Italian through his grandfather. After graduating from high school Mitsushima moved to Tokyo from Okinawa, he worked as an after-school childcare worker there, and became a production director for the film Be Sure to Share.

After living in Tokyo for about two years, he took a chance to cycle around Japan for seven months from May to November 2009. Mitsushima traveled around the country from Hokkaido to Kagoshima Prefecture. On the street, he saw posters, signboards, and magazines of a film in which his older sister appeared and realized that his sister "impressed a lot of people" and he has "to work hard as well", and came to aim for the way of acting. Later in December, Mitsushima joined to the office in which his sister has belonged.

In 2010, he made his acting debut as the lover of Tomoko Nakajima's character in Osorubeki Oya-tachi performed in the Tokyo Metropolitan Theatre.

Mitsushima made his starring debut in the film Zoku Ittara Jinsei Kawatta www released 9 November 2013.

He later married his sister Hikari's manager at the end of 2014.

In 2016, he voiced the main character Satoru Fujinuma in the anime television Erased in which he made his voice acting debut.

In 2019, Mitsushima announced on his official Instagram his agency has changed to from Humanite to Veleta 104, becoming a more independent artist.

== Filmography ==
=== TV dramas ===
Year	Title	Role	Notes	Ref.
2014	Osōshiki de Aimashō	Yusuke Ohta		
2016	Mohōhan	Kazuaki Takai		
2020	A Day-Off of Kasumi Arimura	Makoto	Episode 1	
2019	Idaten	Shinkei Yoshioka	Taiga drama	
2021	Reach Beyond the Blue Sky	Odaka Chōshichirō	Taiga drama	
2022	New Nobunaga Chronicle: High School Is a Battlefield	Shingen Takeda		
2023	Galápagos	Sadafumi Nakano		
2023	Hayabusa Fire Brigade	Kansuke Fujimoto		
2026	Water Margin	Yang Zhi		
2026	Kidnap Game	Higa Kuranosuke		

=== Films ===
Year	Title	Role	Ref.
2012	11:25 The Day He Chose His Own Fate	Masakatsu Morita	
2012	Ōoku: The Inner Chambers	Sanosuke	
2013	Oshin	Shunkaku	
2013	Zoku Ittara Jinsei Kawatta www	Ryotaro Oku	
2016	Over Fence	Yukio Mori	
2016	Star Sand	Takayasu	
2017	Blade of the Immortal	Daito Kyo	
2017	Mumon: The Land of Stealth	Jirobee Gezan	
2017	The Third Murder	Teru Kawashima	
2017	Before We Vanish	Maruo	
2017	Hanagatami		
2018	You, Your, Yours		
2018	Kuso-yarō to Utsukushiki Sekai	Joe	
2019	Kingdom	Bi	
2019	The Forest of Love	Shin	
2020	Labyrinth of Cinema	Kameji	
2021	Zokki		
2022	Kingdom 2: Far and Away	Bi	
2022	Akira and Akira		
2023	Kingdom 3: The Flame of Destiny	Bi	
2024	Dear Family	Jun Sakurada	
2025	Babanba Banban Vampire	Umetaro Sakamoto	
2026	Kingdom 5: The Clash of Souls	Bi	
2026	Kill Your Tears, Okiharu	Toma Akasaka	

=== Stage ===
Year	Title	Role
2010	Osorubeki Oya-tachi	
2012	Enron	
2013	Inori to Kaibutsu – Wilville no Sanshimai – Ninagawa Version	
2014	Yuji Sakamoto: Rōdoku Geki Ni Rei Jū Shi Fuki no Hatsukoi, Ebina SA Kalashnikov Furin Kaikyō	
2014	Hi no yō ni samishī Ane ga ite	
2015	Hamlet	Rareities
2015	Yoru e no Nagai Tabiji	
2016	Gekirin	

=== TV anime ===
Year	Title	Role	Notes	Ref.
2016	Erased	Satoru Fujinuma	Leading role	
2016	Nyanbo!	Narrator		

=== Anime films ===
Year	Title	Role	Ref.
2017	Napping Princess	Morio	

=== Advertisements ===
Year	Title	Ref.
2012	Yomiuri Shimbun "Boku no Hashirenakatta michi"	
2012	Suntory Non aru Kibun "Chichūkai Lemon Ressha"	
2013	Mobage Dai Senran!! Sangokushi Battle "Player in Sekiheki no Tatakai"	
2013	Komatsu Limited "930E"	
2013	Uniqlo "AIRism"	
2013	Kewpie "Yasai kara Taberu: Celery"	
2013	Sansan	
2014	Honda Hybrid "Sue"	
2015	Recruit Sumai Company "Suumo"	
2016	SoftBank	
2017	Coca-Cola Company Coca-Cola	
2017	U-Can "Kawaru, kikkake."	

=== Dubbing ===
Year	Title	Role	Ref.
2018	Mutafukaz	Willy	
2022	Jurassic World Dominion	Franklin Webb	

== Awards and nominations ==
2012

Award	Category	Work	Ref.
4th Tama Film Award	Best New British Actor Award	11:25 The Day He Chose His Own Fate	
37th Hochi Film Award	Newcomer Award	11:25 The Day He Chose His Own Fate	
27th Takasaki Film Festival	Best New Family Actor Award	11:25 The Day He Chose His Own Fate	
67th Japan Broadcast Film and Art Grand Prize	Film Division Excellence Newcomer Award	11:25 The Day He Chose His Own Fate	
