= Yutaka Yamada =

Japanese composer (born 1989)

Yutaka Yamada やまだ 豊
- Born: March 14, 1989 (age 37)
- Origin: Tokyo, Japan
- Genres: Soundtrack; anime composer; film score; electronica
- Occupations: Composer; arranger; orchestrator
- Instruments: Piano; keyboard; guitar; drums
- Years active: 2011–present
- Website: yutakayamada.com

Yutaka Yamada (やまだ 豊, Yamada Yutaka; born March 14, 1989) is a Japanese composer, arranger, and orchestrator based in Los Angeles. He is best known for composing musical scores for Tokyo Ghoul and Vinland Saga.

== Biography ==
Yutaka Yamada is an alumnus of the Senzoku Gakuen College of Music in Japan, where he studied musical composition under Toshiyuki Watanabe and Masataka Matsuo. Yamada has written scores for more than 40 projects, including the anime series Tokyo Ghoul, the Japanese television series Marumo no Okite (Marumo's Rule) and a number of TV commercials such as "Audi", "Samsung Galaxy" and "Georgia (Coca-Cola)".

Yamada's work on Tokyo Ghoul attracted public attention shortly after its release in 2014. Its original soundtrack, which includes the main theme song "Glassy Sky" (sung by Donna Burke), gained popularity and has garnered over 50 million views on YouTube. In 2018, Eminem sampled "Glassy Sky" on the track "Good Guy" from his Kamikaze album.

Yamada has continued to produce popular music in collaboration with vocalists, including the tracks "Never Let Me Go" (sung by Julia Shortreed) and "Take My Hand" (sung by NIKIIE), both of which were reached No. 1 on the iTunes chart in Japan. In 2017, Yutaka relocated to Los Angeles and began working with Soundtrack Music Associates for representation.

== Works ==
=== Anime ===
Year	Title	Role(s)
2013	Soul Reviver	Main theme composer
2013	Sword Gai	Main theme composer
2014	Tokyo Ghoul	Composer
2015	Tokyo Ghoul √A	Composer
2015	Tokyo Ghoul [Jack]	Composer
2015	Tokyo Ghoul: PINTO	Composer
2016	Onigiri	Main theme composer
2017	Infini-T Force	Composer
2018	Tokyo Ghoul:re	Composer
2019	Vinland Saga	Composer
2019	Babylon	Composer
2020	Great Pretender	Composer
2021	Night Head 2041	Composer
2023	Vinland Saga Season 2	Composer
2024	Viral Hit	Composer
2025	Yaiba: Samurai Legend	Composer (Other tracks by Yoshiaki Dewa)
2026	Black Torch	Composer
2027	Kagurabachi	Composer

=== Television dramas ===
Year	Title	Role(s)
2011	Marumo's Rule (Fuji TV)	Composer (Other tracks by Hiroyuki Sawano)
2011	Marumo's Rule Special (Fuji TV)	Composer
2011	HUNTER – Women After Reward Money (Kansai Telecasting)	Composer
2014	Marumo's Rule Special 2014 (Fuji TV)	Composer
2014	The Hours of My Life (Fuji TV)	Composer (Other tracks by Yoshiaki Dewa)
2014	Chotto ha Darazu ni (NHK, BS Premium)	Composer
2014	Water Polo Yankees (Fuji TV)	Composer (Other tracks by Yu Takami)
2014	Borderline (NHK)	Composer
2015	The Emperor's Cook (TBS)	Composer (Other tracks by Takefumi Haketa)
2015	Fujiko (Hulu, JCOM)	Composer
2016	Never Let Me Go (TBS)	Composer
2016	Death Note: New Generation (Hulu)	Composer
2017	Everyone's Getting Married (Fuji TV)	Composer (Other tracks by Toshiyuki Yasuda and Yuji Nishiguchi)
2017	Criminal Syndrome (Tokai Television, WOWOW)	Composer
2018	The True Suspect (WOWOW)	Composer
2020	Alice in Borderland	Composer
2021	Promise Cinderella (TBS)	Composer
2022	Alice in Borderland Season 2	Composer
2025	Alice in Borderland Season 3	Composer

=== Movies ===
Year	Title	Role(s)
2013	Madam Marmalade's Mysterious Puzzle: Question Version (TV Tokyo)	Composer (Other tracks by Tadayuki Ito)
2013	Madam Marmalade's Mysterious Puzzle: Answer Version (TV Tokyo)	Composer
2016	A.I. Love You (Fuji Television)	Composer
2016	Death Note: Light Up the New World (Warner Bros.)	Composer
2017	One Week Friends (Shochiku)	Composer
2017	Let's Go, Jets! (Toho)	Composer
2017	Laughing Under the Clouds Side story – Departure, the Vow of Yamainu (Shochiku)	Composer
2018	Infini-T Force (Shochiku)	Composer
2018	Inuyashiki (Toho)	Composer
2018	Laughing Under the Clouds Side story –The Double-Headed Fuma (Shochiku)	Composer
2018	Bleach (Warner Bros.)	Composer
2018	Cry Me a Sad River (Beijing Enlight Media)	Composer
2019	Kingdom (Toho, Sony)	Composer
2020	Mask Ward (Warner Bros.)	Composer
2021	Tokyo Revengers (Warner Bros.)	Composer
2021	Cube (Shochiku)	Composer
2022	Kingdom 2: Far and Away (Toho, Sony)	Composer
2023	Kingdom 3: The Flame of Destiny (Toho, Sony)	Composer
2024	Golden Kamuy (Toho)	Composer
2024	Kingdom 4: Return of the Great General (Toho, Sony)	Composer
2026	Golden Kamuy: The Abashiri Prison Raid (Toho)	Composer
2026	Kingdom 5: The Clash of Souls (Toho, Sony)	Composer

== Awards and recognition ==
- 2009 Grand prize at VIENNA INSTRUMENTS Strings Arrangement Contest.
- 2016 Brilliant Citizen Award ("Azalea Kagayaki") by the city of Kawasaki, Japan.
