= Kingdom 5: The Clash of Souls =

2026 film by Shinsuke Sato

- Japanese: キングダム 魂の決戦
- Directed by: Shinsuke Sato
- Screenplay by: Tsutomu Kuroiwa; Yasuhisa Hara
- Based on: Kingdom by Yasuhisa Hara
- Produced by: Naoaki Kitajima; Shinzou Matsuhashi; Ryousuke Mori; Yuuya Satoyoshi; Shirley Kao
- Starring: Kento Yamazaki; Ryo Yoshizawa; Kanna Hashimoto; Jun Shison; Fūju Kamio; Jun Kaname; Yuki Yamada; Etsushi Toyokawa; Shun Oguri
- Cinematography: Akira Sako
- Edited by: Tsuyoshi Imai
- Music by: Yutaka Yamada
- Production company: Credeus
- Distributed by: Toho; Sony Pictures Entertainment
- Release date: July 17, 2026 (Japan)
- Running time: 134 minutes
- Country: Japan
- Language: Japanese

Kingdom 5: The Clash of Souls (Japanese: キングダム 魂の決戦, Hepburn: Kingudamu Tamashii no Kessen) is a 2026 Japanese historical war film directed by Shinsuke Sato. An adaptation of the manga of the same name by Yasuhisa Hara, the film is the sequel to Kingdom 4: Return of the Great General (2024).

== Plot ==
Shin has grown into the commander of a 1,000-man unit. Although Kyou Kai has left the Hi Shin Unit, Ka Ryo Ten joins as its strategist. Meanwhile, Ei Sei learns that the palace maid Kou is pregnant with his child. Soon afterward, news arrives that the six states other than Qin have formed a coalition army and launched an invasion. Ei Sei gathers Qin's leading generals and orders them to defend the kingdom, marking the beginning of a decisive battle for Qin's survival.

== Cast ==
- Kento Yamazaki as Shin (Xin)
- Ryo Yoshizawa as Ei Sei (Ying Zheng)
- Kanna Hashimoto as Ka Ryo Ten (He Liao Diao)
- Nana Seino as Kyou Kai (Qiang Lei)
- Shinnosuke Mitsushima as Heki (Bi)
- Amane Okayama as Bi Hei (Wei Ping)
- Jun Shison as Mou Ten (Meng Tian)
- Fūju Kamio as Ou Hon (Wang Ben)
- Kousei Yuki as Kou Yoku (Xiang Yi)
- Ayaka Miyoshi as Ka Rin (Wa Lin)
- Ryoki Miyama as Haku Rei (Bai Li)
- Mizuki Yamashita as You (Yang)
- Aju Makita as Kou (Xiang)
- Miou Tanaka as En (Yuan)
- Togi Makabe as Hai Rou (Pei Lang)
- Kouhei Takeda as Den Kou (Tian Xiao)
- Kenta Izuka as Shou Sa (Song Zuo)
- Sō Kaku as Ryu Sen (Long Chuan)
- Takayuki Hamatsu as Taku Kei (Ze Gui)
- Tomohiro Waki as Rai Do (Lei Tu)
- Kisuke Iida as Ri Shi (Li Si)
- Kento Shibuya as Sei Kai (Cheng Hui)
- Kai Shishido as Ordo (Wo Lu Duo)
- Masahiro Takashima as Shou Bun Kun (Lord Changwen)
- Jun Kaname as Toh (Teng)
- Masaya Kato as Shi Shi (Si Shi)
- Mitsuomi Takahashi as Kan Ou (Gan Yang)
- Yūsuke Hirayama as Mou Bu (Meng Wu)
- Tomohiro Inoue as Ijiko (Note: a movie-original character)
- Masaki Miura as Roku O Mi (Lǜ Wu Wei)
- Takafumi Imai as Ba Myu (Ba Miu)
- Wataru Ichinose as Rin Bu Kun (Lord Lin Wu)
- Yui Sakuma as Kaine (Hai Yin)
- Katsuya as Kan Mei (Han Ming)
- Bando Yajuro as Mou Gou (Meng Ao)
- Satoshi Hashimoto as Chou Tou (Zhang Tang)
- Takashi Sasano as Sai Taku (Cai Ze)
- Ayumi Tanida as Ou Sen (Wang Jian)
- Aoi Nakamura as Kei Sha (Qing She)
- Kei Tanaka as Go Hou Mei (Wu Feng Ming)
- Takumi Saitoh as Shun Shin Kun (Lord Chunshen)
- Yuki Yamada as Man Goku (Wan Ji)
  - Tsukasa Enomoto as young Man Goku
- Kenji Sakaguchi as Kan Ki (Huan Yi)
- Hiroshi Tamaki as Shou Hei Kun (Lord Changping)
- Kōichi Satō as Ryo Fui (Lü Buwei)
- Etsushi Toyokawa as Hyou Kou (Biao Gong)
- Shun Oguri as Ri Boku (Li Mu)

== Production ==
Principal photography took place primarily in Yamaguchi Prefecture. Kanna Hashimoto, who played Ka Ryo Ten, temporarily left the filming of the television series Omusubi to participate in the film. As her commitment to the film had been made prior to the television series, NHK accommodated her schedule. According to a weekly magazine, Etsushi Toyokawa, who played Hyou Kou, had been struggling with chronic back pain, which at times forced filming to stop.

== Music ==
The score for Kingdom 5: The Clash of Souls was once again composed by Yutaka Yamada, and its theme song is "Yodaka" by Kenshi Yonezu.

== Reception ==
=== Box office ===
Kingdom 5: The Clash of Souls was released on July 17, 2026, and debuted at No. 1, drawing 993,000 moviegoers and grossing ¥1.584 billion during its first three days. Including the Monday national holiday, the four-day total reached 1.315 million admissions and ¥2.064 billion at the box office. Compared with the four-day opening of Kingdom 4: Return of the Great General, admissions reached 89.5% while box office revenue amounted to 93.6%. On August 12, it was announced that the film had grossed ¥5.16 billion in its first 26 days of release. It became the first Japanese live-action film series to have each of its first five installments surpass ¥5 billion at the box office.
