= Kingdom 4: Return of the Great General =

2024 film by Shinsuke Sato

- Japanese: キングダム 大将軍の帰還
- Directed by: Shinsuke Sato
- Screenplay by: Tsutomu Kuroiwa; Yasuhisa Hara
- Based on: Kingdom by Yasuhisa Hara
- Produced by: Naoaki Kitajima; Shinzou Matsuhashi; Ryousuke Mori; Yuuya Satoyoshi; Shirley Kao
- Starring: Kento Yamazaki; Ryo Yoshizawa; Nana Seino; Amane Okayama; Takahiro Miura; Yuko Araki; Jun Kaname; Shun Oguri; Kōji Kikkawa; Takao Osawa
- Cinematography: Akira Sako
- Edited by: Tsuyoshi Imai
- Music by: Yutaka Yamada
- Production company: Credeus
- Distributed by: Toho; Sony Pictures Entertainment
- Release date: July 12, 2024 (Japan)
- Running time: 145 minutes
- Country: Japan
- Language: Japanese
- Box office: ¥8.03 billion

Kingdom 4: Return of the Great General (Japanese: キングダム 大将軍の帰還, Hepburn: Kingudamu Daishōgun no Kikan) is a 2024 Japanese historical war film directed by Shinsuke Sato. An adaptation of the manga of the same name by Yasuhisa Hara, the film is the sequel to Kingdom 3: The Flame of Destiny (2023). The fifth film, Kingdom 5: The Clash of Souls (キングダム 魂の決戦, Kingudamu Tamashii no Kessen), was released in Japan on July 17, 2026.

== Plot ==
The film opens with a quick recap of the events in Kingdom 3: General Ouki (Wang Qi) questioning King Eisei (Ying Zheng)'s motives for unifying China; Ten (He Liao Diao) deciding to participate in war as a strategist; Zhao's attack on Qin; Shin (Xin) leading the Hi-Shin Unit up a cliff to assassinate General Fuki (Feng Ji); and Ouki's order to his sub-generals not to venture beyond sight of the enemy camp. The recap ends with the reveal of Zhao's secret commander, Hoken (Pang Nuan) — who calls himself the “Bushin” (War God) — and his sudden attack on the Hi-Shin Unit's camp.

The story proper begins with Shin and Kyoukai (Qiang Lei) attempting to attack Hoken together at their campsite. Shin is defeated effortlessly, and though Kyoukai lasts longer, she too is overpowered. When Shin regains consciousness, he orders his remaining men to throw their spears at Hoken. Hoken deflects them easily, killing many, and Shin is badly injured.

Qin troops soon arrive and attack Hoken en masse, but Zhao reinforcements counterattack. The remnants of the Hi-Shin Unit flee, carrying the wounded Shin with them. They are pursued by a Zhao detachment led by [name pending, not shown in film]. Part of the Hi-Shin Unit runs off to divert the pursuers from Bihei (Wei Ping) and Bito (Wei Dao), who are carrying Shin, but the Zhao commander does not fall for the ruse.

Back in Joto Village, Bihei's and Bito's families pray for their safe return.

On the road, Bihei realises the enemy is following his trail of blood. He urges his brother Bito to continue carrying Shin, knowing that staying together will doom them all. Bito reluctantly leaves as Bihei stays behind to draw off the pursuers.

When Shin later regains consciousness, he and Bito recall their shared past. Bihei once bullied Shin as a child, and Shin beat up both Bihei and Bito. Now, Bito muses that they've willingly risked their lives for the same boy, predicting Shin will become a great general. He wishes Shin success before dying.

The surviving members of the Hi-Shin Unit reunite, Shin carrying Bito's body. Bihei grieves his brother's death.

Because Hoken and Kyoukai both hail from the Shiyuu tribe, Kyoukai provides insight into his power. She explains that Hoken's strength comes from a lifetime of relentless, disciplined training. The blow that nearly killed Shin was meant to destroy his body from within — he is lucky to have survived. Shin vows to defeat Hoken. Kyoukai notes softly that Hoken was once a good soul.

The thirty-six surviving members of the Hi-Shin Unit rendezvous with General Ouki. Determined to press on for their fallen comrades, Shin impresses Ouki, who tells him that the path to becoming a general is the path of sacrifice.

Meanwhile, Hoken returns to the Zhao camp as Qin's General Mou Bu (Meng Wu) launches an attack.

At the same time, Ten and Lord Riboku (Li Mu) — who had joined the Qin command post under the guise of an observer — monitor the battlefield. Ten notices the signal fires, and Riboku explains that communication can also be done through flags, using colour and position, though their visibility is limited. Qin troops pursuing the enemy hesitate, realising they will lose sight of their own signal flags. When they spot Hoken on the battlefield, General Mou Bu ignores Ouki's standing order and charges after him, only to be trapped by Zhao soldiers.

At the Qin palace, King Eisei receives Yotanwa (Yang Duan He), queen of the Mountain Tribe who had helped him reclaim his throne in the first film. She comes bearing a warning.

Back on the mountaintop, Ten converses with Riboku's aide Kaine (Hai Yin), who tells her that being a strategist is more painful than bleeding on the battlefield.

General Ouki decides to ride out personally to save Mou Bu.

Meanwhile, Yotanwa explains to Eisei that after their previous alliance, her tribe returned home, expanded its territory, and fought against the Huns — the same people against whom Qin, Zhao, and Yan built the Great Wall. She led 80,000 troops into the Hun homeland but found it already decimated — 100,000 Huns had been slaughtered by Zhao's northern garrisons. The fact that Eisei had heard nothing of this indicates Zhao's deliberate concealment of an army capable of defeating the Huns. Yotanwa warns that if such an army joins the current war, Qin will be annihilated. The mastermind behind it all is a brilliant strategist — the only name a surviving Hun could utter was “Riboku,” the very man now observing Qin's battlefield alongside Ten.

At that moment, Zhao soldiers arrive on the mountaintop to escort Riboku away. Ten feels betrayed, especially by Kaine, with whom she thought she had built a rapport. Kaine tells her this is war — that they won't kill her — and that if Ten truly becomes a strategist, they will one day meet again as enemies. She also reveals that Riboku is one of Zhao's “Three Great Heavens.”

Riboku then leads his army to join with Chousou (Zhuang Zhao)'s forces, combining them and advancing toward Ouki's army.

On the battlefield, Ouki arrives, realising that Mou Bu has sacrificed his army to save the trapped troops. Ouki orders Tou (Teng) to activate their plan — leading a contingent of cavalry straight at General Chousou. A Zhao detachment moves to intercept, but Tou cuts through them effortlessly with his signature whirlwind sword technique. Simultaneously, Ouki orders the Hi-Shin Unit to charge directly toward Mou Bu's army without explanation. They comply, breaking through the enemy lines. Zhao responds by sending another force to intercept, inadvertently creating a massive gap in their formation. Ouki seizes the opening and charges.

He is met by Hoken and the Great Heavens Army.

At the palace, King Eisei discusses the grudge between Ouki and Hoken with Shoubunkun (Lord Changwen), who reveals that General Kyou (Liao) — one of Qin's Six Great Generals — was a woman who was to be Ouki's wife. She was a prodigy in warfare and, secretly, King Shou (King Zhaoxiang of Qin)'s daughter, taken in by Ouki's father for protection.

Shoubunkun recounts how King Shou once visited the Battle of Nanan, where he recognised Kyou as his child and called her his treasure. As a child, Ouki had promised to marry her if she became a great general. Afterward, Kyou wore a mask to conceal her identity.

Back on the field, Hoken and Ouki charge each other for their first joust — it ends in a draw. On the second, Ouki is nearly unhorsed. Hoken taunts him with memories of Kyou's death nine years earlier, driving Ouki into a furious counterattack that unhorses Hoken. The duel continues on foot. Just as Ouki is about to deliver the killing blow, Riboku arrives with the Great Heavens Army and attacks. Ouki orders a retreat — first line to guard, second to lead the infantry, third and fourth to secure a base behind Chousou's left wing.

Ouki and Hoken continue their duel amidst the chaos. Ouki rallies his troops to fight their way out of Riboku's trap in a desperate battle.

Riboku orders his second line to charge, determined to kill Ouki once and for all. Before he can succeed, Hoken mortally wounds Ouki. Tou arrives and creates an opening for the Qin army to retreat. Shin carries Ouki from the battlefield. Hoken lets them go. As he dies, Ouki urges Shin to sit straight and experience the battle fully. Mou Bu, Tou, Kanou, and others fight to clear a path for him.

Kaine asks Riboku why they do not pursue Ouki to take his head. Riboku replies that their objective has been achieved, and further pursuit would only enrage Qin, prolonging the war. He says enough blood has been spilled.

As his final act, Ouki transfers command to Tou, witnessed by Kanou. Mou Bu asks forgiveness; Ouki encourages him, predicting that he will become one of Qin's greatest generals. He reflects that Zhao was the most formidable enemy he ever faced — and that it is the natural order for one great general to eventually fall to another. Finally, he tells Shin that he cannot train him, joking that it was selfish of Shin to expect him to. He advises him to learn through the battlefield itself and passes him his battle glaive before dying on his horse.

Back at the palace, Eisei tells Shoubunkun that before departing, Ouki had entrusted him with King Shou's lessons on kingship.

== Cast ==
- Kento Yamazaki as Shin (Xin)
- Ryo Yoshizawa as Ei Sei (Ying Zheng)
- Kanna Hashimoto as Ka Ryo Ten (He Liao Diao)
- Nana Seino as Kyou Kai (Qiang Lei)
- Amane Okayama as Bi Hei (Wei Ping)
- Takahiro Miura as Bi Toh (Wei Dao)
- Yuko Araki as Kyou (Liao)
- Riku Hagiwara as Mou Ki (Meng Yi)
- Togi Makabe as Hai Rou (Pei Lang)
- Sō Kaku as Ryu Sen (Long Chuan)
- Miou Tanaka as En (Yuan)
- Takayuki Hamatsu as Taku Kei (Ze Gui)
- Norihito Kaneko as Gi Ka (Wei Jia)
- Eri Murakawa as Yu Ri (You Li)
- Hinako Sakurai as Tou Bi (Dong Mei)
- Jun Kaname as Toh (Teng)
- Yūsuke Hirayama as Mou Bu (Meng Wu)
- Mitsuomi Takahashi as Kan Ou (Gan Yang)
- Masahiro Takashima as Shou Bun Kun (Lord Changwen)
- Masaya Kato as Shi Shi (Si Shi)
- Yui Sakuma as Kaine (Hai Yin)
- Koji Yamamoto as Chou Sou (Zhuang Zhao)
- Yuki Yamada as Man Goku (Wan Ji)
- Masao Kusakari as Shou Ou (King Zhaoxiang of Qin)
- Masami Nagasawa as You Tan Wa (Yang Duan He)
- Hiroshi Tamaki as Shou Hei Kun (Lord Changping)
- Kōichi Satō as Ryo Fui (Lü Buwei)
- Shun Oguri as Ri Boku (Li Mu)
- Kōji Kikkawa as Hou Ken (Pang Nuan)
- Takao Osawa as Ou Ki (Wang Qi)

== Music ==
The score for Kingdom 4: Return of the Great General was once again composed by Yutaka Yamada, and its theme song is "Delusion:All" by One Ok Rock.

== Awards and nominations ==
Award	Category	Recipient(s)	Result	Ref.
23rd New York Asian Film Festival	Best from the East Award	Kento Yamazaki	Won	
Elle Cinema Awards 2024	Elle Men Award	Kento Yamazaki	Won	
67th Blue Ribbon Awards	Best Actor	Kento Yamazaki	Nominated	
67th Blue Ribbon Awards	Best Supporting Actor	Takao Osawa	Won	
48th Japan Academy Film Prize	Best Film	Kingdom 4: Return of the Great General	Nominated	
48th Japan Academy Film Prize	Best Director	Shinsuke Sato	Nominated	
48th Japan Academy Film Prize	Best Actor	Kento Yamazaki	Nominated	
48th Japan Academy Film Prize	Best Supporting Actor	Takao Osawa	Won	
48th Japan Academy Film Prize	Best Music	Yutaka Yamada	Nominated	
48th Japan Academy Film Prize	Best Cinematography	Akira Sako	Won	
48th Japan Academy Film Prize	Best Lighting Direction	Hiroyuki Kase	Won	
48th Japan Academy Film Prize	Best Art Direction	Hidetaka Ozawa	Nominated	
48th Japan Academy Film Prize	Best Sound Recording	Kazushiko Yokono	Won	
48th Japan Academy Film Prize	Best Film Editing	Tsuyoshi Imai	Nominated	
