= Shinsuke Sato =

Japanese film director (born 1970)

- 佐藤 信介
- Born: 16 September 1970 (age 55); Hiba, Hiroshima, Japan
- Occupations: Film director, screenwriter

Shinsuke Sato (佐藤 信介, Satō Shinsuke; born September 16, 1970) is a Japanese film director and screenwriter. He has directed several live-action film adaptations of manga and anime, including The Princess Blade (2001), Gantz (2011), I Am a Hero (2016), Bleach (2018), Inuyashiki (2018), Kingdom (2019) and its sequels.

== Filmography ==
=== Film ===
Year	Title	Director	Writer	Notes	Ref.
1997	Tokyo Lullaby	No	Yes		
1998	Tadon to chikuwa	No	Yes	Segment "Tadon"	
2000	Zawa-zawa Shimokita-sawa	No	Yes		
2000	Sunflower	No	Yes		
2001	The Princess Blade	Yes	Yes		
2002	Rock'n'Roll Mishin	No	Yes		
2003	Seventh Anniversary	No	Yes		
2005	Spring Snow	No	Yes		
2005	All About My Dog	Yes	Yes		
2006	Star Reformer	No	Yes		
2008	Sand Chronicles	Yes	Yes		
2009	Oblivion Island: Haruka and the Magic Mirror	Yes	No		
2011	Gantz	Yes	No		
2013	Library Wars	Yes	No		
2014	All-Round Appraiser Q	Yes	No		
2015	Library Wars: The Last Mission	Yes	No		
2016	I Am a Hero	Yes	No		
2016	Death Note: Light Up the New World	Yes	No		
2018	Bleach	Yes	Yes		
2018	Inuyashiki	Yes	No		
2019	Kingdom	Yes	Yes		
2022	Kingdom 2: Far and Away	Yes	No		
2023	Kingdom 3: The Flame of Destiny	Yes	No		
2024	Kingdom 4: Return of the Great General	Yes	No		
2026	Kingdom 5: The Clash of Souls	Yes	No		
TBA	My Hero Academia	Yes	No	American film	

=== Television ===
Year	Title	Director	Writer	Notes	Ref.
2016	Death Note: New Generation	Yes	No	1 season	
2020–2025	Alice in Borderland	Yes	Yes	3 seasons	

=== Video game ===
Year	Game	Role
2002	Tekken 4	Character and scenario designer
2005	Red Ninja: End of Honor	Collaboration support
