= List of The Disastrous Life of Saiki K. chapters =

The Disastrous Life of Saiki K. is a Japanese manga series written and illustrated by Shūichi Asō. The series began serialization in Shueisha's Weekly Shonen Jump magazine on May 14, 2012. The first collected tankōbon volume was published on September 4, 2012, with 26 volumes released as of August 2018. The series ended serialization on February 26, 2018. Shueisha later revealed that a 4-panel sequel would begin serialization on March 5, 2018. Asō also published a one-shot manga in the first summer 2018 issue of Shueisha's Jump Giga on May 25, and another chapter on July 26, 2018.

== Volumes ==
No.	Release date	ISBN
0	May 2, 2012	978-4-08-870455-5
1. "Telepathy" (テレパシー, Terepashī); 2. "Telekinesis" (テレキネシス, Terekineshisu); 3. "X-Ray Vision" (X線ビジョン, X-sen bijon); 4. "Precognition" (予知, Yochi); 5. "Teleportation" (念力移動, Nenriki idō); 6. "Clairvoyance" (千里眼, Senrigan); 7. "Astral Projection" (幽体離脱, Yūtai Ridatsu)
A collection of one-shots about Saiki that were published in Weekly Shonen Jump and Jump Next! Kusuo Saiki is a high school student who was born with all sorts of psychic abilities from levitation to telepathy. Instead of trying to take advantage of his powers in any way possible, he finds the powers to be annoying, and tries to keep them a secret in order to live a normal life. Riki Nendo, a delinquent punk-looking classmate who bugs Saiki, is accused to stealing wallets from their classmates' bags. Saiki determines it is someone else. Saiki is being bullied, when Nendo tries to save him. He uses x-ray vision and meets a street magician named Chono. His precognition vision shows a memorial picture of Nendo, so Saiki tries to hang out with Nendo for the day, only to learn that the picture was actually of Nendo's late father. He uses teleportation to help Chono with a magic trick in which Chono's new assistant was going to make Chono look bad. He meets classmate Shun Kaido, who claims he has seen a weird student with psychic powers. He uses astral projection to possess Nendo's body when the latter was knocked out by a baseball.
1	September 4, 2012	978-4-08-870504-0
1. "The Disaster of a Psi User" (超能力者のΨ難, Chōnōryokusha no sainan); 2. "The Ab-PSI-lute Worst!? Nendou Riki" (最低Ψ悪！？燃堂力, Saitei saiaku!? Nendō Riki); 3. "Shun Kaidō, AKA The Jet-Black Wings" (漆黒の翼こと海藤瞬, Shikkoku no Tsubasa Koto Kaidō Shun); 4. "Three Men, a Little Girl, a Policeman and a Dog"; 5. "Reach Him! Sign of Love" (届け！恋のΨン, Todoke! Koi no sain); 6. "Hot-Blooded! Dodgeball! (Part 1)" (熱血！ドッジボール（前編）, Nekketsu! Dojjibōru (Zenpen)); 7. "Hot-Blooded! Dodgeball! (Part 2)" (熱血！ドッジボール（後編）, Nekketsu! Dojjibōru (Kōhen)); 8. "Fighting for a RePSIval!"
Kusuo Saiki has an abundance of psychic powers, but prefers to remain a low-key high school student. He intervenes in a feud between his parents by forcing telepathy between them so they learn their true feelings of each other. He talks about how he used to show off his powers in kindergarten, but that led to all sorts of trouble, so he keeps it a secret. During the high school entrance day, he and Riki Nendo help Takahashi to the infirmary but it turns out Takahashi had faked his illness to get out of the event. Shun Kaido, a classmate who thinks he is a special student being pursued by an organization called Dark Reunion but is actually a chunibyo, deals with a snake that got loose in a classroom. Kaido, Nendo, and Saiki help a little girl find her dog. Saiki tries to fend away the romantic advances of classmate Chiyo Yumehara. Saiki has to play dodgeball without revealing his powers yet help out his team which consists of sports enthusiast Kineshi Hairo. Saiki and Nendo talk a guy out of committing suicide.
2	December 4, 2012	978-4-08-870556-9
9. "RedePSIgning the Saikis' House!? A Dramatic Overhaul!!" (斉木家Ψ建！？劇的大改造！！, Saiki-ke Saiken!? Gekiteki Daikaizō!!); 10. "Deception! Mind-Control" (欺け！マインドコントロール, Azamuke! Maindo Kontorōru); 11. "How PSIspicious! The Dark Reunion!" (うさんくΨぞ！ダークリユニオン！, Usankusai zo! Dāku Riyunion!); 12. "Beach PSIde Summer Story" (ビーチΨド 夏物語, Bīchisaido Natsu Monogatari); 13. "Gifted with Beauty and PSIgacity! Teruhashi Kokomi" (Ψ色兼備！照橋心美, Saishoku Kenbi! Teruhashi Kokomi); 14. "A Reunion After So Long! Psycher"; 15. "A House Sitting DiPSIster" (留守番のΨ難, Rusuban no Sainan); 16. "School is Back in PSIssion! Nendou's Melancholy" (学校Ψ開！燃堂の憂鬱, Gakkō Saikai! Nendō no Yūutsu); 17. "Please Make Me Your DePSIple" (弟子にしてくだΨ, Deshi ni shite Kudasai); 18. "The Spiritualist from the Next Class Over" (隣のクラスの霊能力者, Tonoari no Kurasu no Reinōryoku-sha)
Saiki helps his parents rearrange furniture and rooms. Saiki explains how he has used mind control to influence how people see him and his abilities that have been made public. Saiki watches as Kaido is swindled of his valuables by another student who was role-playing being related to the organization against Dark Reunion. Nendo and the guys take Saiki to the beach; Nendo fails to pick up a girl, but when the girl is later drowning, Nendo and the others rescue her thanks to Saiki's secret help. Kokomi Teruhashi, a self-proclaimed "perfect girl" who is beautiful and kind, is shocked when Saiki pays absolutely no attention to her, despite her multiple attempts to greet him. Saiki tries to rescue Chono from a dangerous televised magic trick. While house sitting for his parents, Saiki is bothered by cockroaches. Saiki and Kaido notice Nendo is acting rather strange, so they follow them through town. Reita Toritsuka, a fellow psychic who can see ghosts, wants Saiki to disciple him. Toritsuka enrolls in Saiki's school where he tries to become popular with the girls by telling them about their guardian ghosts.
3	January 4, 2013	978-4-08-870621-4
19. "In PSIearch of Hairo Kineshi's Wooden Materials" (灰呂杵志の木Ψを求めて, Hairo Kineshi no Mokusai o Motomete); 20. "Escape with the InvinPSIble Camouflage!" (無敵の迷Ψ服で脱出せよ！, Muteki no Meisaifuku de Dasshutsu seyo!); 21. "The Danger in a 3 Month RelationPSIp" (交Ψ3ヶ月の危機, Kōsai San Kagetsu no Kiki); 22. "Burn! PK Academy Sports Festival! (Part 1)" (燃えろ！PK学園体育Ψ(前編), Moero! Pī Kei Gakuen Taiikusai (Zenpen)); 23. "Burn! PK Academy Sports Festival! (Part 2)" (燃えろ！PK学園体育Ψ(中編), Moero! Pī Kei Gakuen Taiikusai (Chūhen)); 24. "Burn! PK Academy Sports Festival! (Part 3)" (燃えた！PK学園体育Ψ(後編), Moeta! Pī Kei Gakuen Taiikusai (Kōhen)); 25. "The Hair That Burned Out"; 26. "Burning Right! Disaster Drill" (燃えるな！防Ψ訓練！！, Moeruna! Bōsai kunren); 27. "Luxury Coffee "PSI"lly" (魅惑のΨ高級コーヒーゼリー, Miwaku no Saikōkyū Kōhī Zerī); 28. "To Prevent a Psisaster"; 29. "Teruhashi-san's Psig Ordeal"
Saiki helps Hairo build a gate for the school's cultural festival. Saiki uses invisibility in order to leave school so he can watch a television program, but his classmates block his way out. Saiki tries to help Chiyo maintain a relationship with her boyfriend despite the latter's major flaws. Saiki participates in the school's sports festival, but during one of the events, Nendo accidentally removes Saiki's antenna and he loses control of his powers. Although he gets his antenna back, he isn't feeling that well. The school holds a disaster evacuation drill, Saiki buys a premium coffee jelly but later sacrifices it to retrieve a baseball lost by a kid. Saiki learns of a popular fortune-teller and discovers she is scamming others especially Kaido. Teruhashi joins the guys to a supposedly good ramen shop that appears to be really low quality.
4	May 2, 2013	978-4-08-870652-8
30. "The DiPSIster of Spirit Medium Toritsuka Reita" (霊能力者 鳥束零太のΨ難, Reinōryoku-sha Toritsuka Rei no Sainan); 31. "STOP IT! The Murder Switch!" (止めろ！ヒトコロスイッチ, Tomero! Hitokoro Suicchi); 32. "ExPSIbition! Jump Festa"; 33. "Get excited! PSIlnent night!" (はしゃげ! Ψレントナイト, Hashage! Sairento Naito); 34. "A PSIreously Annoying New Year's (Part 1)" (うるΨお正月(前編), Urusai Oshōgatsu (Zenpen)); 35. "A PSIreously Annoying New Year's (Part 2)" (うるΨお正月(中編), Urusai Oshōgatsu (Chūhen)); 36. "A Pint-PSIzed King Appears" (ちいΨ王様君臨, Chiisai Ōsama Kunrin); 37. "PSImply Terrifying! Matsuzaki-sensei"; 38. "Chocolate FePSIvle!"; 39. "The AbPSIlute Worst!? Nendou's Dad"; 40. "No PSIspicion! Saiki Kurumi"
Reita Toritsuka shares his story about talking with ghosts and helping a girl find her gym clothes. Saiki uses his precognition power to stop a chain of events leading to an explosion. Saiki attends the Jump Festa convention. When Nendo visits the Saikis and reveals he has never met Santa before, Saiki's father dresses up as one and fools him into thinking he's really Santa. During the New Years shrine visit, Saiki's parents are shocked that Saiki has made a number of friends from school that they invite him over, but when Saiki's mother accidentally reveals that Saiki is a psychic, Saiki must erase his schoolmates' memories afterwards. Saiki meets an arrogant cat who is stuck between the walls of two buildings. Saiki's classmates try to trick the strict physical education teacher Matsuzaki-sensei, but Saiki foils their plan. Saiki's friends deal with chocolates on Valentine's Day. Saiki is bothered by Nendo's father who is a ghost, that he goes to Toritsuka for help. Saiki tries to help his mother from being scammed by a door-to-door salesman into buying useless products.
5	July 4, 2013	978-4-08-870768-6
41. "Telepathy PSIlencer"; 42. "Leave it to Chance! A TroublePSIme Final Exam!"; 43. "Return of the PSIper Star!"; 44. "ImpoPSIble to intervene!? Nendou vs Kaidou!"; 45. "We'll get back together for PSIure this time! Chouno Uryoku (Part 1)"; 46. "We'll get back together for PSIure this time! Chouno Uryoku (Part 2)"; 47. "The State of Mera-san's PSInances"; 48. "Get ExPSIted! Fitness Test"; 49. "A PSImall Love Story"; 50. "Latest Shitty Game ReleaPSI! Olfana's Story"; 51. "PSI'm Home! Mama"
Saiki discovers a ring that blocks his telepathy, so he uses it to go to a movie theater, but finds himself seated next to Kokomi, who is then met with teen actor Toru Mugami. During finals, Saiki notices Nendo is resorting to rolling a pencil to get random answers, yet somehow he does well on his exam. Toru, who turns out to be Kokomi's older brother, visits Saiki and tells him to stay away from his sister, revealing that he has a huge sister complex. Chono has Saiki assist in his next magic show in order to impress his ex-wife. Nendo shows up and volunteers to be in the next act, and it is revealed Chono's ex-wife is Nendo's mother. Saiki helps out classmate Chisato Mera, who is secretly working as a waitress and other random jobs to make ends meet, be accepted by gym teacher Matsuzaki-sensei. During the fitness test, Hairo finds he is being outdone by Nendo. Saiki helps the cat (now named Amp) get along with a female cat. Saiki tries to play an unpopular but cheap video game, and realizes how crappy it is. Kaido's mother invites Nendo and Saiki to their home.
6	September 4, 2013	978-4-08-870806-5
52. "The Most PSIuitible for a Confession!? Spiritual Possession"; 53. "Fly! PSIborg Sodaman, Mark II"; 54. "PSIki Kusuo's Issues with G♀rls"; 55. "Who is going to win? The Destined Group AsPSIgnments"; 56. "All Aboard The ESP ExPSIress! Go!"; 57. "PSIardon Me! The Okinawa School Trip"; 58. "PSIlutations! The Okinawa School Trip"; 59. "PSIorry 'bout that! The Okinawa School Trip"; 60. "Here we go! The Okinawa PSIchool Trip"; 61. "PSI ya later! The Okinawa School Trip"; 62. "The Biggest Top Rate EnterPSIse? Dad's Work"
Reita tries to confess to a girl he likes by letting the spirits of popular guys possess his body. A young boy named Yuuta Iridatsu believes Saiki to be his favorite superhero Cyborg Cider-Man Version 2 after witnessing his abilities. Chiyo and Kokomi get to know each other, but suspect they both share a crush on Saiki. The two girls try to join Saiki's group for the class trip to Okinawa. Saiki intervenes on some obstacles that threaten to cancel or ruin the class trip. Kaido tries to show off his Kansai dialect, and the guys visit a snake vs. mongoose show. After stopping the guys from peeping at the girls in the bath, Saiki rests outside until Kokomi arrives and removes one of his hairpins, and then the hotel disappears. After restoring the hotel, Saiki finds himself having to deal with Kokomi who thinks she is in a lucid dream with him. The next day the class visits a pineapple farm and aquarium, and then the beach where Chiyo gets upset that she doesn't garner any attention from the guys. However, when some guys hit on Teruhashi and disparage Chiyo, Kaido sticks up for her. On the last day of the trip, Saiki attempts to get a limited coffee red bean anmitsu. Saiki visits his father's workplace which is a manga publishing company.
7	December 4, 2013	978-4-08-870853-9
63. "PSIborg Sodaman Mark II vs. Mysterious Being Lemonade"; 64. "Saiki Kusuo's Day at the FestPSIval"; 65. "Nice to Beat You!! OutPSIder"; 66. "Transfer Student ~NiPSI to Meet You~"; 67. "AsPSIemble! Nendou Family"; 68. "RePSItrucuring! Café Mami"; 69. "What's the Plan!? A Meeting to DePSIde the Class Project"; 70. "Sing! Reita RePSItal!"; 71. "PK Academy's School FePSIval! (1st Half)"; 72. "Make Some Noise! PK Academy's School FePSIval! (2nd Half)"; 73. "PubliPSIzing the Popularity Contest Results!"
Yuuta visits Saiki and learns that Nendo looks like Baron Cola. Saiki's visit to the local festival is disrupted by a pickpocket. Transfer student Aren Kuboyasu finds it difficult to hold back from his habits as a delinquent, especially when it comes to interacting with Saiki and his friends. Nendo's father sees her former wife and falls in love; Saiki tries to help him possess Nendo. The cafe manager ponders how to attract new customers. Saiki's class tries to determine what project to do for the upcoming school festival. Toritsuka asks Saiki to help him with his band. During the festival, the guys visit a haunted house. But when Saiki takes off his glasses, he accidentally gazes at Nendo, turning him into stone. Saiki must prevent from the statue from breaking the second time. The results of the popularity poll are presented.
8	April 4, 2014	978-4-08-880027-1
74. "Let's go to the Cultural FestPSIval After Party"; 75. "Piece of Cake RePSIcling! Straw Millionaire"; 76. "The Most PSItunningly Beautiful Girl VS The Man Who Will Never Fall (First Half)"; 77. "The Most PSItunningly Beautiful Girl VS The Man Who Will Never Fall (Second Half)"; 78. "InnoPSInt or Guilty!? The Burglary Incident"; 79. "ExcerPSIze Your Powers! Toritsuka's Plan to Get Popular"; 80. "PSIchic Santa Claus"; 81. "Let's Buy New Home ApPSIances!"; 82. "The New Year PSIcle"; 83. "Kaidou's PSIspicion (1st Half)"; 84. "Kaidou's PSIspicion (2nd Half)"
Kaido, Nendo, and Saiki get lost trying to find the class after party. Saiki uses the Straw Millionaire concept to exchange things of slightly increasing value so he can pay for his restaurant bill. In order to avoid Makoto's drama shoot, Saiki takes Kokomi on a date in the neighboring town. But when Makoto changes locations to that town, Saiki takes Kokomi to a game center and tries to find ways to get Kokomi to get her to dislike him. Kaido acts like a detective drama character to try to solve a mystery at school. Toritsuka tries to go on a big date with all the girls he has attracted from letting ghosts possess his body. Saiki dresses up as Santa Claus to deliver gifts for the neighborhood kids. Saiki tries to buy a television with his New Year's money but is pestered by the store clerk. Saiki's classmates talk about their New Year's firsts. Kaido sees Kuboyasu hold off some bullies and suspects he is a delinquent. Kaido and Saiki are later bullied for money when Kuboyasu intervenes.
9	July 4, 2014	978-4-08-880072-1
85. "The AbPSIlute Worst Employee"; 86. "Ready to go! Runner's PSI!"; 87. "Teruhashi-san ReviPSIts The Saiki House"; 88. "Press Play! A "Making of" PSItory"; 89. "Transform! Super PSIze"; 90. "The Peak of ExPSItement! Karaoke Party"; 91. "PSIpporting Re-Education"; 92. "BanPSI! Tsundere Grandpa"; 93. "Welcome to the PSIcluded Theme Park!"; 94. "PSIjian! Parting With the Grandparents"; 95. "The PSInnacle of the Golden Age of Heroes! A Fun Party Game"
After Nendo is fired from his part-time jobs, Kaido and Kuboyasu try to help him on the next one. Saiki's class does a 10km run. Kokomi visits Saiki's mom but has to deal with Saiki babysitting Yuuta. After watching a good movie, Saiki visits the film location but finds that the actual acting was quite different. Amp swallows a part of Saiki's dad's model robot figure, so Saiki transforms his size to retrieve it, but has to deal with a cockroach. Saiki has trouble trying to get and enjoy a parfait at his class karaoke party. Kongo is a delinquent third-year student bully at PK Academy, but will be held back a grade unless he changes his ways. The Saikis visit Kusuo's grandparents, of whom his grandfather Kumagoro is a classic tsundere (cold on the outside, warm on the inside). They go to a run-down amusement park where Kumagoro tries to bond with Kusuo. Kumagoro plots for them to stay longer, but when they come across a road black, Kusuo reveals to his grandparents that he is a psychic. Saiki and friends try out a new cross-over fighting video game.
10	September 4, 2014	978-4-08-880175-9
96. "ExerPSIze Your Wit! The PK Occult Club"; 97. "The AbPSIlute Worst Chef"; 98. "PSImashing! Surprise Party (First Half)"; 99. "PSImashing! Surprise Party (Second Half)"; 100. "Fear! The Curse of the __th Chapter"; 101. "Court in SesPSIon! The Kokomins Trial!"; 102. "The Achromatic InviPSIble Boy"; 103. "The Mad PSIentist Appears! Part 1"; 104. "The Mad PSIentist Appears! Part 2"; 105. "The Mad PSIentist Appears! Part 3"; 106. "ExPSItreme Dash! Battle of Abilities!"
Toritsuka recruits Saiki to join his Occult Club. Saiki looks forward to making crepes, but is grouped with Hairo and Kaido, who know nothing about cooking. Saiki suspects his class is planning a surprise birthday party for him but it is actually his father's, so he has him attend in his place. Saiki hears the number 100 in multiple places. Saiki is abducted and put on trial by Kokomi's fan club, the Kokomins, for being too close to Kokomi. Trying to avoid the guys, Saiki accidentally ends up in the girls' locker room. When Saiki's hair ornament gets damaged, his family has to get it repaired by Saiki's older brother Kusuke who is in London. After repairing the ornament, Kusuke challenges Kusuo to a game of tag in which Kusuo has to evade Kusuke for three hours but bring Nendo and Kaido along.
11	December 4, 2014	978-4-08-880224-4
107. "Please be PSIlent in the Museum"; 108. "DiPSIster Before Summer Vacation"; 109. "In the Midst of PSIummer Vacation! Occult Club Part"; 110. "In the Midst of PSIummer Vacation! Tennis Club Part"; 111. "In the Midst of PSIummer Vacation! Clinical Trial Part Time Job Part"; 112. "In the Midst of PSIummer Vacation! Motorcycle Training Course Part"; 113. "In the Midst of PSIummer Vacation! Teruhashi Date Part"; 114. "The Famous Rich Son of a BuPSIness Conglomerate Appears!"; 115. "Surpass the UnsurpasPSIble Strength!"; 116. "ReviPSIting! Tsundere Grandpa"; 117. "Talent PSIprouts!? The Melancholy of a Famous Magician!"
Saiki, Nendo and Kaido visit a modern art museum where Kaido starts acting like some kind of expert. Saiki wants to have a trouble-free summer vacation, but his friends soon book up his entire summer with activities. He joins the Occult Club's summer trip where they have a test of courage with Kaido, Chiyo, Arisa, and Toritsuka. He and Nendo then join Hairo's Tennis Club training camp. Saiki and Nendo join Mera in a clinical trials where they take mysterious drugs. Saiki notices Mera and Nendo transform grotesquely. Saiki, Kaido, and Kuboyasu then attend motorcycle training classes. Saiki then takes Teruhashi on a date to the amusement park but brings Yuuta, and they have to watch a hero show. The wealthy Metori Saiko transfers into Saiki's class and woos Kokomi, but she refuses because she harbors feelings for Saiki. Saiko then makes life miserable for Saiki and Kokomi's friends and family, so Saiki gets his revenge on Saiko. When Saiki's grandparents visit Tokyo, Kumagoro is left in the Shibuya district by himself and ends up befriending Nendo. Saiki visits Chono and Michael, who have become more successful as comedy magicians.
12	February 4, 2015	978-4-08-880304-3
118. "The DiPSIster of the Rental Video Store"; 119. "The Ultimate PSInancial Strength of the Saiko Clan"; 120. "Halloween Party in sesPSIon"; 121. "The DiPSIster of Break Time"; 122. "CourtPSIde Love"; 123. "Out of Control Imagination ExerPSIse!"; 124. "First Hand PSIence Fiction"; 125. "First Hand PSIence Fiction (2)"; 126. "First Hand PSIence Fiction (3)"; 127. "Fashion PSInce: Out of Stock"; 128. "Osu! Love Challenge"
At a video rental store, Saiki has the challenge of picking a film that won't get spoiled by the clerk's thoughts. Saiko offers to pay Nendo to be his underling, but Nendo refuses, preferring to just be friends. Kaido hosts a Halloween party, but the guys have no clue how to dress or what to do there. Saiki is interrupted by his friends during the break in-between class periods. Toritsuka asks Saiki to help him impress a girl named Aiko by joining Hairo's tennis team training. Chiyo has become morbidly obese, so Saiki uses telepathy to project Kaido's image to motivate her to exercise to lose the weight. Saiki's parents celebrate their 19th wedding anniversary when Kusuke calls and informs them that Saiki's limiter might have a problem. When Saiki awakens, he finds himself 20 years in the past and must stop Nendo's father from ruining his parents' first encounter. Although he gets his parents to meet, but when he returns to the present, things have adically changed due to the butterfly effect to a post-apocalyptic world. Saiki finds that Kusuke had been using a time machine and started World War III. In a cross-over chapter, Saiki and his father visit the diner from Food Wars!: Shokugeki no Soma. Saiki, Kaido and Nendo are shopping at a clothing store when they see Kokomi and attempt some questionably fashionable clothes. Kuboyasu, who has been dealing with a lot of challenge letters, receives a love letter for once and doesn't know how to respond.
13	May 1, 2015	978-4-08-880355-5
129. "Another ChriPSImas Challenge!"; 130. "Your First ExeperienPSIs of the New Year are Important."; 131. "The DiPSIster of All You Can Eat Dessert"; 132. "Counter-Plan to Prevent a DiPSIster"; 133. "An ExPSIlent Wife and Mother!? Mom's Class Reunion."; 134. "Kaidō and Kuboyasu's PSIspicions"; 135. "The Lost Hamster PSIpeaks in a Country Accent"; 136. "Place to Place! Mini PSIzed Animal"; 137. "The PSIko Corporation Home Visit"; 138. "Come on Over! To PSIko Land"; 139. "Publication CriPSIs!? Shuensha's Work"
Hoping for some peace and quiet, Saiki hangs out on a playground, but feels uneasy when Nendo, Kaido, and Kokomi have a Christmas party at his house. On New Year's, Saiki notices his friends and family are showing up on various television programs. Saiki transforms into a girl in order to visit a dessert cafe but runs into Kokomi, Chiyo, and Mera. When Nendo and Kaido visit Saiki to play in the snow, Saiki gets premonitions of the two in a tragic situation. Saiki follows his mother to a class reunion where he foils her former classmate's revenge plan. Kaido and Kuboyasu speculate that Hairo might be gay. Saiki helps a lost hamster find his owners, but as they bought another hamster, he asks his classmates to take care of him. When Saiki and the guys have to give Saiko some school printouts, Saiko tries to show off his mansion to them, but they are not impressed. Saiko has the house radically remodeled with things the guys like. Saiki takes his father's place at work and visits a manga artist to get him to finish his chapter.
14	August 4, 2015	978-4-08-880426-2
140. "CongratulaPSIons on Your Graduation!"; 141. "Deceit! PSIpril Fools"; 142. "Cutting Through the PSIlence, the Ghost in the Music Room"; 143. "The DiPSIster of Rifuta Imu"; 144. "PSIpring's Ultimate Weapon"; 145. "RePSIcle! Trash Cleanup Competition"; 146. "Gifts From a SenPSIble Wife & a Gifted Man"; 147. "The Mystifying PSIchic Circus (1st Half)"; 148. "The Mystifying PSIchic Circus (2nd Half)"; 149. "CruPSIde! Rifuta vs Teruhashi"; 150. "Massage DiPSIster"
During the graduation ceremony, Saiki realizes he hardly knows any upperclassmen unlike his friends. Kaido's April Fool's Day jokes bite back when he sees some of Saiki's telekinesis activity and cannot convince his classmates it is real. Toritsuka asks Saiki to help him exorcise a ghost in the music room. Imu Rifuta, an attractive first-year girl, finds that she is no match for Teruhashi. Saiki finds that his sneezing from allergies has a serious impact. Saiki and friends participate in a trash cleanup competition. Saiki's parents prepare birthday gifts for each other. Nendo and Kaido bring Saiki to the circus, but Chono, who had been working as a clown magician, gets injured so Saiki has to perform in his place. But when Saiki gets a premonition of a big accident, he finds himself more involved in the acts in order to stop it. Rifuta notices that Teruhashi pays attention to Saiki and tries to woo him. After getting a massage chair from Kusuke, Kurumi gives Kusuo a massage but finds his shoulders to be unusually stiff.
15	October 3, 2015	978-4-08-880462-0
151. "The PSIko Corporation's Extravagant Cruise"; 152. "The Shipwreck of Saiki Kusuo"; 153. "The Shipwreck of Saiki Kusuo 2"; 154. "The Shipwreck of Saiki Kusuo 3"; 155. "The Shipwreck of Saiki Kusuo 4"; 156. "Death PSIntence! The PK Academy Newspaper Club"; 157. "PSIcond Round! Time Leap"; 158. "PSIgning Into The Game World"; 159. "Preventing A PSIcam!"; 160. "PSIki Family Gathering!!"; 161. "So Long! The Last Day of PSIummer Vacation."
Saiko invites the gang on a cruise, but they get shipwrecked on an island. Saiki realizes that things got out of control because his limiter was removed, and that they are now far away from Japan. He helps the gang build a raft by making materials conveniently available. They argue over who should stay or go. Saiki secretly arranges for them to be rescued. After returning to school, the newspaper club tries to interview them and portray their activities in a sensationalist light, but Saiki foils their plan. Saiki finds himself, Nendo and Kaido stuck in a time loop. Saiki's father tells him to play his online game. Saiki' grandfather is scammed into bringing money to a station, but the scammer is actually Kusuke. The Saikis hang out with the grandparents and attend a festival. The bonus chapter is about Kokomi's story about pursuing Saiki.
16	January 4, 2016	978-4-08-880582-5
162. "PSIuper Annoying! A Totally Bad News Transfer Student Appears!"; 163. "Slip Past The Aura PSIght!"; 164. "The Delicate CircumPSItances of Children"; 165. "Train DiPSIster"; 166. "ReleaPSI Your True Strength!"; 167. "Espers Should ExcerPSIse Extreme Caution (1st Half)"; 168. "Espers Should ExcerPSIse Extreme Caution (2nd Half)"; 169. "The Rural Mad PSIentist"; 170. "The Library DiPSIster"; 171. "UnPSIghtly, A Bolt From the Blue"; 172. "The Calamity of the Silent PSIborg"
17	April 4, 2016	978-4-08-880652-5
173. "Let's Go! PK Academy PSIkickers!"; 174. "Hoping You Get Well PSIoon!!"; 175. "PSImall but Clever! The Adventures of Riki Jr. Mark II"; 176. "PSIolving the Biggest Riddle! (1st Half)"; 177. "PSIolving the Biggest Riddle! (2nd Half)"; 178. "A Battle Between the Two AbPSIlutely Worst People"; 179. "Winter DisPSIster"; 180. "A Miraculously Normal PersPSIon Appears!"; 181. "Heart Pounding RelaPSIonship Announcement"; 182. "The Best Possible PSIpport!?"; 183. "The PSIper Wallet Warrior: 100 Yen Man"
18	July 4, 2016	978-4-08-880728-7
184. "The DiPSIster of Satou Hiroshi"; 185. "Style the PSIdes a Little"; 186. "Mera ChiPSIato's Reunion (1st Half)"; 187. "Mera ChiPSIato's Reunion (2nd Half)"; 188. "The DiPSIster of a Beginner Mangaka"; 189. "AsPSImble! The Ultimate Spot Reservists"; 190. "PrefaPSIng The End"; 191. "Building The PSItrongest Deck!"; 192. "The Die is Cast...! A FeroPSIous Card Battle"; 193. "The Ultimate Trial of the PSIko Clan"; 194. "Psychic PSIdekicks"
19	October 4, 2016	978-4-08-880791-1
195. "PSIcary Movie: Occult Club"; 196. "The PSIperior Love Contest"; 197. "The Genius Artists ClasPSIroom"; 198. "ReconPSItructing the Baseball Club! (First Part)"; 199. "ReconPSItructing the Baseball Club! (Middle Part)"; 200. "ReconPSItructing the Baseball Club! (Final Part)"; 201. "A Miraculous InvenPSIon!?"; 202. "Class DiPSIster"; 203. "PSIearching for a Romantic Partner"; 204. "The Perfect PrePSInt for a Beloved Little PSIster"; 205. "ReintroduPSIng the Spirit Medium"
20	December 31, 2016	978-4-08-880887-1
206. "The DiPSIster of UPSIless ESP"; 207. "InPSIde the Secret Hideout"; 208. "ReviPSIting! The Older Brother's 5 Trials"; 209. "See the RhinoPSIrous! Let's Go to the Zoo!"; 210. "The Annoying Transfer PSItudent! Akechi Touma"; 211. "Still Annoying! Transfer PSItudent"; 212. "Dad's New ProfesPSIon!?"; 213. "The DiPSIster of the Kaidou Siblings"; 214. "Image Change TranPSIformation Girl"; 215. "Sweet Potato Digging DiPSIster"; 216. "PK Academy School Cultural FestPSIval Preparation " 217. "PK Academy School Cultural FestPSIval Practice "
21	April 4, 2017	978-4-08-881047-8
217. "PK Academy School Cultural FestPSIval Performance"; 218. "Video Game DiPSIster"; 219. "HypnoPSIs Exchange! (Part One)"; 220. "HypnoPSIs Exchange! (Part Two)"; 221. "Let's Reinvent the MaPSIcot Character"; 222. "PSIko Metori's Boring Day"; 223. "Packed Full of Features! The Up and Coming New MaPSIcot"; 224. "PSIlebrating The End of The Year! New Year's Eve"; 225. "A PSIlent New Year"; 226. "ReviPSIT! Grandparent's Travel Log."
22	July 4, 2017	978-4-08-881180-2
228. " ConverPSIation About the Kids! A Mama Meeting"; 229. "No Need for Bath Salts! Taking a Dip in the PSIcret Hot Springs"; 230. "Returning the Favor! Toritsuka's Fasting ExerPSIze"; 231. "Out of Sync Boy Girl RelaPSIonships (First Half)"; 232. " Out of Sync Boy Girl RelaPSIonships (Second Half)"; 233. "Choosing the Best Person to Walk Home from PSIchool With"; 234. "Do Some RePSIearch! The Super Idol's Secret"; 235. "Make PSIure You Eat Your Vegetables! Yakiniku Time"; 236. "Read the PSIgns! Aiura Mikoto's Fortune Telling"; 237. "PrefaPSIng the End (2)"; 238. "The PSIspicious New Teacher"
23	October 4, 2017	978-4-08-881211-3
239. "The DiPSIster of the School Physical"; 240. "Don't Forget Your Birthday PrePSInt!"; 241. "DiviPSIon Strategy, Start!"; 242. "PSIpot The Difference! The Perfect Beautiful Girl's Ordeal"; 243. "Welcome to PSIberspace"; 244. "The Hero DiPSIster"; 245. "Trending on a Streaming PSIte"; 246. "ConPSItructing an Unusual Day"; 247. "ConPSItructing an Unusual Past (First Part)"; 248. "ConPSItructing an Unusual Past (Middle Part)"; 249. "ConPSItructing an Unusual Past (Middle Part-2)"; 250. "ConPSItructing an Unusual Past (Final Part)"
24	January 4, 2018	978-4-08-881315-8
251. "ViPSIting A Friend's House While Their Parents Are Out Psi icon" 252. "Proudly Presenting Our Clay PSIculptures"; 253. "Evaluation! PSIchickers!"; 254. "Everyone Please Try It For YourPSIlves!"; 255. " APSIsting In Mediating A Long-Term Marriage!"; 256. "Let's Get PSIrealized in Jump!"; 257. "Terrifying! A DiPSIstrous Transfer Student Appears! (1st Half) " 258. "Terrifying! A DiPSIstrous Transfer Student Appears! (2nd Half)"; 259. "A Perfect ReconPSItruction!? KusuΩ"; 260. "Let's Publish A PSIcoop!"; 261. " PSIko Metori's Equation For Victory"; 262. "RePSIcue The Bullied! Iguchi-Sensei"
25	April 4, 2018	978-4-08-881377-6
263. "Suddenly! A Real Realistic EPSIcape Room"; 264. "Please Go Watch the Live ActPSIon Movie!"; 265. "To Each Their Own. MiscPSIllaneous Career Paths!"; 266. "Spending the Day Horsing Around with a Friend"; 267. " The Battle Between DiPSIster and PerfecPSIon!!"; 268. "Suddenly! PSIchic Battle"; 269. "Clash! PSIchic Battle"; 270. "The Final PSIhowdown"; 271. "The Final PSIhowdown 2"; 272. "The Final PSIhowdown 3"; 273. "The detrimental environments for minors regulation act"
26	August 3, 2018	978-4-08-881539-8
273. "The Worst PSIchool Break"; 274. "Toritsuka VS Satou! RelaPSIonship Battle!"; 275. "It's Ending! Re-introduPSIng Characters from the Past"; 276. "Let's AsPSImble and Plan a Trip"; 277. " PSI Much to See! Tourists in Endsville!"; 278. "PSIving the World from a CataPSItrophic Natural DiPSIster!"; 279. "The PSInale of Saiki Kusuo"; 280. "The RePSIval of Saiki Kusuo (Part 1)"; 281. " The RePSIval of Saiki Kusuo (Part 2)"
