= List of The Disastrous Life of Saiki K. episodes =

The Disastrous Life of Saiki K. is an anime television series produced by Egg Firm and J.C. Staff, based on the manga series created by Shūichi Asō and published in Shueisha's Weekly Shōnen Jump magazine. The series follows Kusuo Saiki, a high school student with all manner of psychic abilities, who constantly faces misery caused by both his powers and the strange people around him. The series began airing in Japan on TV Tokyo from July 4, 2016, airing five short episodes each week followed by a compilation episode, the series will contain one hundred and twenty episodes in total, along with twenty four compilation episodes. The series is licensed in North America by Funimation, who are simulcasting the series as it airs and began releasing an English dub from August 7, 2016.

For the first twelve compiled episodes, the opening theme is "Seishun wa Zankoku janai" (青春は残酷じゃない, Youth Isn't So Cruel) by Natsuki Hanae while the ending theme, also used for the short episodes, is "Psi desu - I Like You" (Ψです I LIKE YOU) by Denpagumi.inc. From the thirteenth compiled episode onwards, the opening theme is "Sai-Sai-Saikōchō!" (最Ψ最好調！, The Most Favorable!) by Denpagumi.inc while the ending theme is "Kokoro" (こころ, Heart) by Hanae. From Season 2, the first ending theme is "Saihakkenden!" (Ψ発見伝！) by Denpagumi.inc and the first opening theme is "Sairento Purizunā" (Ψレントプリズナー, the Silent Prisoners) by Hiroshi Kamiya, Daisuke Ono and Nobunaga Shimazaki. The second opening theme is "Oteage Psychics" (お手上げサイキクス, Psychics Who Have Given Up Hope) by Shiggy Jr and the second ending theme is "Duet Shite Kudasai" (Duet♥してくだΨ, Please Duet With Me) by Hiroshi Kamiya, Ai Kayano and Eri Kitamura.

== Episodes ==
=== Season 1 ===
Compilation episode order	Short episode order	Title (Note: In many of the episodes' original Japanese titles, the Greek letter Ψ (psi) is used as a substitute in words containing "sai" or "zai". (e.g. sainan (災難, disaster) is written as Ψ難.)) (Note: All English titles are taken from Funimation.)	Original release date
1a	1	"The Disastrous Life of a Psychic (Part 1)"; Transliteration: "Chōnōryokusha no Sainan (Zenpen)" (Japanese: 超能力者のΨ難(前編))	July 4, 2016
Kusuo Saiki, a high schooler born with psychic powers, laments the misfortune he faces because of his abilities.
1b	2	"The Disastrous Life of a Psychic (Part 2)"; Transliteration: "Chōnōryokusha no Sainan (Kōhen)" (Japanese: 超能力者のΨ難(後編))	July 5, 2016
Saiki reluctantly has to intervene in a feud between his parents Kuniharu and Kurumi.
1c	3	"The Worst of the Worst?! Riki Nendo"; Transliteration: "Saitei Saiaku?! Nendō Riki" (Japanese: 最低Ψ悪！？燃堂力)	July 6, 2016
Saiki faces unwanted attention from Riki Nendo, a classmate who is so stupid that his telepathy doesn't work on him.
1d	4	"Shun Kaidou, AKA The Jet-Black Wings"; Transliteration: "Shikkoku no Tsubasa Koto Kaidō Shun" (Japanese: 漆黒の翼こと海藤瞬)	July 7, 2016
Saiki is annoyed by his delusional classmate Shun Kaido, who thinks he is a hero who is fighting an evil organization called the Dark Reunion. A snake appears in the classroom.
1e	5	"Intelligent and Beautiful! Kokomi Teruhashi"; Transliteration: "Sai-shoku Kenbi! Teruhashi Kokomi" (Japanese: Ψ色兼備！照橋心美)	July 8, 2016
Kokomi Teruhashi, a popular girl whom everyone falls for, becomes bewildered when Saiki straight-up ignores her advances.
2a	6	"Hot-Blooded! Dodgeball! (Part 1)"; Transliteration: "Nekketsu! Dojjibōru (Zenpen)" (Japanese: 熱血！ドッジボール（前編）)	July 11, 2016
Saiki's attempts to get out of playing dodgeball, as he has trouble controlling his strength, is thwarted by the hot-blooded Kineshi Hairo.
2b	7	"Hot-Blooded! Dodgeball! (Part 2)"; Transliteration: "Nekketsu! Dojjibōru (Kōhen)" (Japanese: 熱血！ドッジボール（後編）)	July 12, 2016
Finding himself to be the last remaining player on his dodgeball team, Saiki strategizes how to play so that his reputation is not too high to be revered or too low to be shunned.
2c	8	"Reach Him! Sign of Love"; Transliteration: "Todoke! Koi no Sain" (Japanese: 届け！恋のΨン)	July 13, 2016
A classmate named Chiyo Yumehara has a crush on Saiki, but her classic romantic comedy attempts to win his affection are thwarted.
2d	9	"Saiki Family Home Renovation?! Drastic Makeover!!"; Transliteration: "Saiki-ke Saiken!? Gekiteki Daikaizō!!" (Japanese: 斉木家Ψ建！？劇的大改造！！)	July 14, 2016
Saiki's parents make Saiki use his abilities to arrange furniture in their bedrooms.
2e	10	"Deceive! Mind Control"; Transliteration: "Azamuke! Maindo Kontorōru" (Japanese: 欺け！マインドコントロール)	July 15, 2016
Saiki explains how he uses mind control in various situations to gently convince others that his appearance and abilities are a normal part of life.
3a	11	"A Genius Magician?! Uryoku Chono"; Transliteration: "Tensai Majishan!? Chōno Uryoku" (Japanese: 天Ψマジシャン！？蝶野雨緑)	July 18, 2016
Saiki meets a self-proclaimed magician named Uryoku Chono, but the latter is not very good at his craft.
3b	12	"Second Encounter (on TV)! Uryoku Chono"; Transliteration: "Terebi de Saikai! Chōno Uryoku" (Japanese: テレビでΨ会！蝶野雨緑)	July 19, 2016
When Chono appears on TV to do a death-defying stunt, Saiki rushes in to save him, only to wind up in the middle of the stunt himself.
3c	13	"How Shady! Dark Reunion!"; Transliteration: "Usankusai zo! Dāku Riyunion!" (Japanese: うさんくΨぞ！ダークリユニオン！)	July 20, 2016
Saiki observes Kaido getting involved in a secret meeting with another student to defend themselves against the Dark Reunion, but it turns out that student is trying to swindle Kaido out of his valuables.
3d	14	"Beachside Summer Story"; Transliteration: "Bīchisaido Natsu Monogatari" (Japanese: ビーチΨド 夏物語)	July 21, 2016
When forced by his parents to go on a beach trip with his classmates, Saiki tries to keep a low profile. The guys try to rescue a drowning girl, only to be put in a worse situation endangering everyone involved, so Saiki has to save them.
3e	15	"A New School Term Starts! The Melancholy of Nendo"; Transliteration: "Gakkō Saikai! Nendō no Yūutsu" (Japanese: 学校Ψ開！燃堂の憂鬱)	July 22, 2016
Saiki notices Nendo is behaving strangely, so he and Kaidō tail him as Nendo goes and does some shopping in town. They are especially bothered when he has a peculiar expression when he sees little girls.
4a	16	"Please Make Me Your Apprentice!"; Transliteration: "Deshi ni shite Kudasai" (Japanese: 弟子にしてくだΨ)	July 25, 2016
Saiki is approached by another genuine psychic, Reita Toritsuka, who turns out to have the ability to see ghosts. Reita wants Saiki to teach him psychic powers, but Saiki discovers it is for perverted reasons.
4b	17	"Psychic Medium in the Class Next Door"; Transliteration: "Tonari no Kurasu no Reinōryoku-sha" (Japanese: 隣のクラスの霊能力者)	July 26, 2016
Reita enrolls in Saiki's school and uses his ghost-seeing ability to tell the schoolgirls about their ghost guardians.
4c	18	"Kineshi Hairo, in Search of Lumber"; Transliteration: "Hairo Kineshi no Mokusai o Motomete" (Japanese: 灰呂杵志の木Ψを求めて)	July 27, 2016
Kineshi recruits Saiki to help him construct a gate for an upcoming school festival.
4d	19	"Home Alone Disaster"; Transliteration: "Rusuban no Sainan" (Japanese: 留守番のΨ難)	July 28, 2016
While watching over the house, Saiki comes up against his one weakness; a cockroach.
4e	20	"Crisis in Three-Month Relationship"; Transliteration: "Kōsai San Kagetsu no Kiki" (Japanese: 交Ψ３ヶ月の危機)	July 29, 2016
When Chiyo starts brooding about her boyfriend, Saiki worries she will turn her attentions back to him, so he secretly helps the guy arrange a date with her.
5a	21	"Escape Using an Invincible Suit of Camouflage!"; Transliteration: "Muteki no Meisaifuku de Dasshutsu seyo!" (Japanese: 無敵の迷Ψ服で脱出せよ！)	August 1, 2016
Saiki attempts to use invisibility to sneak past his classmates and get home in time to watch his favorite TV show, but it becomes a challenging task as they are all looking for him, and he would be exposed with a single touch.
5b	22	"Get Fired Up! PK Academy Sports Day (Part 1)"; Transliteration: "Moero! Pī Ke Gakuen Taiikusai (Zenpen)" (Japanese: 燃えろ！PK学園体育Ψ(前編))	August 2, 2016
The students of PK Academy participate in Sports Day, with the morning's events being individual events.
5c	23	"Get Fired Up! PK Academy Sports Day (Part 2)"; Transliteration: "Moero! Pī Ke Gakuen Taiikusai (Chūhen)" (Japanese: 燃えろ！PK学園体育Ψ(中編))	August 3, 2016
When Nendo accidentally removes one of Saiki's hair ornaments, Saiki passes out, and the whole world is threatened with catastrophe. It turns out his ornament keeps his powers in check, but when it is restored, he doesn't quite feel back to normal.
5d	24	"Got Fired Up! PK Academy Sports Day (Part 3)"; Transliteration: "Moeta! Pī Ke Gakuen Taiikusai (Kōhen)" (Japanese: 燃えた！PK学園体育Ψ(後編))	August 4, 2016
The guys in Saiki's class make a wager with a neighboring class where the losers would have to get their heads shaved. Saiki becomes motivated to win during the relay race when one of the guys from the other class mentions using dirty-handed tricks.
5e	25	"Don't Catch Fire! Safety Drill!"; Transliteration: "Moeruna! Bōsai kunren" (Japanese: 燃えるな！防Ψ訓練！！)	August 5, 2016
Saiki's class rehearses a fire evacuation when they get stuck in a blocked-off hallway.
6a	26	"Enticing Premium Quality Coffee Jello"; Transliteration: "Miwaku no Saikōkyū Kōhī Zerī" (Japanese: 魅惑のΨ高級コーヒーゼリー)	August 8, 2016
Saiki ends up buying an expensive coffee jello, but sacrifices it in order to help a kid find his baseball.
6b	27	"In Order to Avoid Misfortune..."; Transliteration: "Saiyaku ni Awanai Tame ni wa..." (Japanese: Ψ厄に遭わない為には…)	August 9, 2016
Saiki observes Kaidō getting conned by a fortune teller.
6c	28	"Teruhashi's Biggest Trial..."; Transliteration: "Teruhasi-san Saidai no Shiren" (Japanese: 照橋さんΨ大の試練)	August 10, 2016
Kokomi Teruhashi accompanies Saiki, Nendo, and Kaido to a suspicious-looking ramen restaurant.
6d	29	"The Disastrous Life of Psychic Medium Reita Toritsuka"; Transliteration: "Reinōryoku-sha Toritsuka Reita no Sainan" (Japanese: 霊能力者 鳥束零太のΨ難)	August 11, 2016
Reita converses with the local ghosts to search for a girl's missing gym clothes.
6e	30	"Stop the Killer Domino Effect!"; Transliteration: "Tomero! Hitokoro Suicchi" (Japanese: 止めろ！ヒトコロスイッチ)	August 12, 2016
After having a foreboding dream, Saiki takes action to prevent a chain of events that will cause an explosion.
7a	31	"Reign of the Small King"; Transliteration: "Chiisai Ōsama Kunrin" (Japanese: ちいΨ王様君臨)	August 15, 2016
Saiki comes across an arrogant cat that is stuck between some walls, but refuses to help him until he sincerely says "please".
7b	32	"Frolic! Silent Night"; Transliteration: "Hashage! Sairento Naito" (Japanese: はしゃげ! Ψレントナイト)	August 15, 2016
During a visit to Saiki's house for Christmas, Nendo reveals that he had never been visited by Santa, so Saiki's father dresses up as one.
7c	33	"Noisy New Year's (Part 1)"; Transliteration: "Urusai Oshōgatsu (Zenpen)" (Japanese: うるΨお正月（前編）)	August 19, 2016
Saiki's parents become excited during the New Year's shrine visit when they have been praying for Saiki to make friends, and Kaido, Harai, Nendo, and Teruhashi show up.
7d	34	"Noisy New Year's (Part 2)"; Transliteration: "Urusai Oshōgatsu (Chūhen)" (Japanese: うるΨお正月(中編))	August 19, 2016
As everyone is invited over to the Saiki household, Kurumi accidentally blurts out that Saiki is a psychic.
7e	35	"Noisy New Year's (Part 3)"; Transliteration: "Urusai Oshōgatsu (Kōhen)" (Japanese: うるΨお正月(後編))	August 19, 2016
Saiki is forced to rewrite his classmates' memories of the previous day, but that action comes with its own downsides.
8a	36	"The Scariest! Mr. Matsuzaki"; Transliteration: "Saikyou! Matsuzaki-sensei" (Japanese: Ψ恐！松崎先生)	August 22, 2016
Saiki stumbles upon some students planning to trick the strict PE teacher, Matsuzaki.
8b	37	"Chocolate Festival"; Transliteration: "Chokorēto no Saiten" (Japanese: チョコレートのΨ典)	August 23, 2016
Saiki observes his classmates' reactions regarding receiving or not receiving Valentine's Day chocolate.
8c	38	"Absolutely the Worst!? Nendo's Father"; Transliteration: "Saitei Saiaku!? Nendō Chichi" (Japanese: Ψ低最悪!?燃堂父)	August 24, 2016
The ghost of Nendo's late father visits Saiki, who get annoyed and goes to Toritsuka to have him do something about it.
8d	39	"Totally Trusting! Kurumi Saiki"; Transliteration: "Nōsai Gishin! Saiki Kurumi" (Japanese: ノーΨ疑心！斉木久留美)	August 25, 2016
Saiki's mother is getting constantly deceived by visiting salesmen into buying useless things, so Saiki uses telepathy to help her with the next scammer.
8e	40	"Telepathy Silencer"; Transliteration: "Terepasu Sairensā" (Japanese: テレパスΨレンサー)	August 26, 2016
Saiki comes across a ring that blocks his telepathy, which he hopes to use to watch a movie without any spoilers, but he finds it a challenge and ends up sitting next to Teruhashi.
9a	41	"The Superstar Returns!"; Transliteration: "Sūpāsutā Saitōjō!" (Japanese: スーパースターΨ登場!)	August 29, 2016
Kokomi's superstar brother Makoto shows up at Saiki's house to warn him to stay away from his sister, revealing that he has a disturbing sister complex.
9b	42	"Cast the Die! An Upset in the Finals"; Transliteration: "Sai o Fure! Haran no Kimatsu Tesuto" (Japanese: Ψを振れ！波乱の期末テスト)	August 30, 2016
While Saiki uses his telepathy to 'cheat' during exams in order to keep his ranking in the middle, but Nendo, who has been on the verge of failing and being held back, rolls a pencil and somehow does well.
9c	43	"Second Encounter (For Real This Time)! Uryoku Chono (Part 1)"; Transliteration: "Kondokoso Saikai! Chōno Uryoku (Zenpen)" (Japanese: 今度こそΨ会！蝶野雨緑（前編）)	August 31, 2016
Chono recruits Saiki to be his assistant in a magic show so he can win his ex-wife back, who turns out to be Nendo's mother (and who like Nendo's deceased father bears a striking resemblance to her son).
9d	44	"Second Encounter (For Real This Time)! Uryoku Chono (Part 2)"; Transliteration: "Kondokoso Saikai! Chōno Uryoku (Kōhen)" (Japanese: 今度こそΨ会！蝶野雨緑（後編）)	September 1, 2016
Chono's show takes a turn for the worse when Nendo offers to be his assistant in a body-cutting routine.
9e	45	"Mera's Money Situation"; Transliteration: "Mera-san no Osaifu Jijō" (Japanese: 目良さんのおΨ布事情)	September 2, 2016
Saiki helps out his poor classmate, Chisato Mera, who is secretly working various part-time jobs.
10a	46	"Reignited! Physical Fitness Test"; Transliteration: "Sainen! Supōtsu Tesuto" (Japanese: Ψ燃! スポーツテスト)	September 5, 2016
The PK Academy students take part in physical fitness tests; Hairo keeps getting outperformed by Nendo.
10b	47	"Little Love Story"; Transliteration: "Chiisai Koi no Monogatari" (Japanese: 小Ψ恋の物語)	September 6, 2016
Realising that the cat from before, Amp, is likely in heat, Saiki transforms into a cat to try and help him confess to a female cat.
10c	48	"The Latest Crappy Game! Olfana's Story"; Transliteration: "Kusogē Saishinsaku! Orufanasu Sutōrī" (Japanese: クソゲーΨ新作! オルファナスストーリー)	September 7, 2016
Since most mainstream video games are spoiled for him, Saiki ends up playing a shoddily-made RPG, becoming frustrated by all the hallmarks of a crappy game.
10d	49	"Welcome Home! Mama"; Transliteration: "Okaerinasai! Mama" (Japanese: おかえりなΨ！真魔)	September 8, 2016
Saiki and Nendo visit Kaido's home, but learn that his mother is rather obsessed about education.
10e	50	"The Best Way of Confessing Love?! Spirit-Summoning Technique"; Transliteration: "Kokuhaku no Saiteki!? Kuchiyose no Jutsu" (Japanese: 告白のΨ適!? 口寄せの術)	September 9, 2016
Reita tries to confess to a girl he likes by having other spirits possess his body: first a ladies' man kind of guy and then a harem protagonist type.
11a	51	"Jump! Cyborg Cider-man No. 2"; Transliteration: "Tobe! Kaizō Ningen Saidāman Ni-gō" (Japanese: 飛べ! 改造人間Ψダーマン2号)	September 12, 2016
A young boy named Yuuta Iridatsu believes Saiki to be a superhero named Cyborg Cider-Man Version 2 after witnessing his abilities.
11b	52	"Industry-leading, Top-ranking Company?! Father's Job"; Transliteration: "Saiōte Ichiryū Kigyō!? Chichi no Oshigoto" (Japanese: Ψ大手一流企業!? 父のお仕事)	September 13, 2016
Saiki's father shows Saiki where he works, which is as an editor for a small manga firm that appears to be a knock-off of Shueisha.
11c	53	"Ciderman No. 2 Vs. The Lemonade Fiend"; Transliteration: "Saidāman 2-gō bāsasu Kaijin Remonēdo" (Japanese: Ψダーマン2号vs怪人レモネード)	September 14, 2016
Yuuta, who is now Saiki's neighbor, comes over to watch an episode of Cyborg Cider-man Version 2, but is surprised when Cider-man's nemesis pays a visit.
11d	54	"Kusuo Saiki's Holiday"; Transliteration: "Saiki Kusuo no Saijitsu" (Japanese: 斉木楠雄のΨ日)	September 15, 2016
Saiki becomes livid when a pickpocket steals his wallet at a summer festival.
11e	55	"Kusuo Saiki's Woman Troubles"; Transliteration: "Saiki Kusuo no Jonan" (Japanese: 斉木楠雄の♀難)	September 16, 2016
Kokomi and Chiyo meet each other at a cafe, but when they start sharing details about their crushes, they realize they could both be competing for Saiki.
12a	56	"Who'll Win?! Fateful Grouping"; Transliteration: "Katsu no wa Dotchi!? Unmei no Hankime" (Japanese: 勝つのはどっち!? 運命の半決め)	September 19, 2016
As the class prepare for a school trip to Okinawa, Kokomi and Chiyo try to join Saiki's group.
12b	57	"Trips and Disasters Go Together"; Transliteration: "Tabi ni Sainan wa Tsukimono" (Japanese: 旅にΨ難はつきもの)	September 20, 2016
After Saiki manages to prevent Makoto from going on the school trip, a typhoon puts the entire trip in danger.
12c	58	"Let's Go On a Plane! With a Psychic On Board!"; Transliteration: "Chōnōryoku-sha Tōsai Ryokakuki de Gō!" (Japanese: 超能力者搭Ψ旅客機でGO!)	September 21, 2016
Saiki deals with all kinds of troubles during his class' flight to Okinawa.
12d	59	"We're Here! Okinawa School Trip"; Transliteration: "Chābirasai! Okinawa Shūgakuryokō" (Japanese: ちゃーびらΨ! 沖縄修学旅行)	September 22, 2016
Upon arriving in Okinawa, Kaido is eager to show off his knowledge of the Okinawan dialect.
12e	60	"Hello! Okinawa School Trip"; Transliteration: "Haisai! Okinawa Shūgakuryokō" (Japanese: ハイΨ! 沖縄修学旅行)	September 23, 2016
While Saiki takes a nap after keeping the boys from peeking into the women's bath, Kokomi removes one of his hair ornaments, leading him to do something to the hotel in his sleep.
13a	61	"I'm Sorry! Okinawa School Trip"; Transliteration: "Wassaibīn! Okinawa Shūgakuryokō" (Japanese: わっΨびーん! 沖縄修学旅行)	September 26, 2016
After returning the hotel to normal, Saiki has to search for Kokomi, who had taken his ornament.
13b	62	"The Worst Night-Time Incident in Okinawa"; Transliteration: "Saiyaku na Ayo no Dekigoto in Okinawa" (Japanese: Ψ悪な或る夜の出来事in沖縄)	September 27, 2016
Saiki ends up stuck with Kokomi, who believes she is in a lucid dream.
13c	63	"Yah! Okinawa School Trip"; Transliteration: "Yāsassai! Okinawa Shūgakuryokō" (Japanese: やーさっΨ! 沖縄修学旅行)	September 28, 2016
When the class visits the beach, Chiyo gets annoyed that she gets hardly any reaction from the guys to her swimsuit.
13d	64	"See You Again! Okinawa School Trip"; Transliteration: "Matayāsai! Okinawa Shūgakuryokō" (Japanese: またやーΨ! 沖縄修学旅行)	September 29, 2016
Chiyo comes to admire Kaido after he protects her from some beach delinquents.
13e	65	"See You Again, Again! Okinawa School Trip"; Transliteration: "Matamatayāsai! Okinawa Shūgakuryokō" (Japanese: またまたやーΨ! 沖縄修学旅行)	September 30, 2016
Saiki attempts to get a limited Coffee Red Bean anmitsu before his school trip ends.
14a	66	"Sup Homies!! Outsider"; Transliteration: "Yoroshiku! Autosaidā" (Japanese: 夜露死苦!!アウトΨダー)	October 3, 2016
A transfer student named Aren Kuboyasu struggles to hide his past as a former delinquent.
14b	67	"A Transfer Student! The First Encounters"; Transliteration: "Tenkōsei! Saisho no Deai~" (Japanese: 転校生! Ψ初の出会い~)	October 4, 2016
Kuboyasu attempts to make friends with his classmates.
14c	68	"Mr. and Mrs. Nendo Together!"; Transliteration: "Sorō! Nendō Fusai" (Japanese: 揃う! 燃堂夫Ψ)	October 5, 2016
Saiki reluctantly helps Nendo's father profess his love to his wife.
14d	69	"Reviving Café Mami!"; Transliteration: "Keieisaiken! Junkissa Mami" (Japanese: 経営Ψ建！純喫茶魔美)	October 6, 2016
The café Chisato works at tries to find ways to improve their advertising to avoid going out of business.
14e	70	"Guilty or Not Guilty?! Theft Case"; Transliteration: "Yūzai Muzai!? Tōnan Jiken" (Japanese: 有罪無Ψ!? 盗難事件)	October 7, 2016
Inspired by a detective drama, Kaido looks into an alleged theft case at school.
15a	71	"Which Idea Will Be Picked?! School Festival Planning"; Transliteration: "Saiyō naru ka!? Kurasu Dashimono Teian-kai" (Japanese: Ψ用なるか！？クラス出し物提案会)	October 10, 2016
Saiki's class tries to decide what to do for the school festival.
15b	72	"Sing! Reita's Recital"; Transliteration: "Utae! Reita Risaitaru" (Japanese: 歌え！ REITA リΨタル)	October 11, 2016
Reita ropes Saiki into helping out his band, whose members cannot play any instruments.
15c	73	"Go Wild! PK Academy School Festival Part 1"; Transliteration: "Sawage! PīKē Gakuen Bunkasai (Zenpen)" (Japanese: さわげ！PK学園文化Ψ(前編))	October 12, 2016
As the school festival gets underway, Saiki loses his glasses and accidentally turns Nendo into stone.
15d	74	"Go Wild! PK Academy School Festival Part 2"; Transliteration: "Sawage! PīKē Gakuen Bunkasai (Kōhen)" (Japanese: さわげ！PK学園文化Ψ（後編）)	October 13, 2016
Saiki has to try and keep the petrified Nendo from being discovered or broken.
15e	75	"Let's Go to the School Festival Wrap-up Party"; Transliteration: "Bunkasai Uchiage Ikō" (Japanese: 文化Ψ打ち上げ行こう)	October 14, 2016
Saiki, Kaido and Nendo get lost on their way to a wrap-up party.
16a	76	"The Perfect Pretty Girl vs. the Super Stubborn Guy (Part 1)"; Transliteration: "Saikyō Bishōujo vs Zettai ni Ochinai Otoko (Zenpen)" (Japanese: Ψ強美少女VS絶対に落ちない男(前編))	October 17, 2016
In order to avoid Makoto's drama shoot, Saiki ends up taking Kokomi on a date in the neighboring town.
16b	77	"The Perfect Pretty Girl vs. the Super Stubborn Guy (Part 2)"; Transliteration: "Saikyō Bishōjo vs Zettai ni Ochinai Otoko (Kōhen)" (Japanese: 強美少女VS絶対に落ちない男(後編))	October 18, 2016
When Makoto changes locations to the neighboring town, Saiki tries to avoid running into him, while trying to use his extended time with Kokomi to get her to dislike him.
16c	78	"Psychic Santa Claus"; Transliteration: "Saikikku Santa Kurōsu" (Japanese: Ψキック・サンタクロース)	October 19, 2016
Saiki gets roped into acting as the neighborhood Santa Claus.
16d	79	"Let's Go Buy the Latest Electronics!"; Transliteration: "Saishin Kaden o Kai ni Ikō!" (Japanese: Ψ新家電を買いに行こう!)	October 20, 2016
Using his New Year's money from his parents, Saiki plans to buy a new television but gets pestered by the sales clerk.
16e	80	"New Year's Cycle"; Transliteration: "Toshi Hajime no Saikuru" (Japanese: 年初めのΨクル)	October 21, 2016
Saiki's friends talk about their New Year's stories.
17a	81	"Kaido's Suspicion (Part 1)"; Transliteration: "Kaidou no Saigishin (Zenpen)" (Japanese: 海藤のΨ疑心(前編))	October 24, 2016
Kaido starts to suspect Kuboyasu of being a delinquent after observing him beating up some bullies and interacting at school.
17b	82	"Kaido's Suspicion (Part 2)"; Transliteration: "Kaidou no Saigishin (Kouhen)" (Japanese: 海藤のΨ疑心(後編))	October 25, 2016
Saiki and Kaido are confronted by more bullies and robbed when Kuboyasu drops by.
17c	83	"No Intervention Needed?! Nendo Vs. Kaidou"; Transliteration: "Chuusai Muyou!? Nendo vs Kaidou" (Japanese: 仲Ψ無用!? 燃堂VS海藤)	October 26, 2016
Nendo and Kaido challenge each other to a game of air hockey; while Nendo has a natural knack to playing, Kaido employs cheat tactics to even the score.
17d	84	"The Worst Part-timer"; Transliteration: "Saiaku no Arbeiter" (Japanese: Ψ悪のアルバイター)	October 27, 2016
Nendo wants to buy a present for his mother, but gets fired from his part-time jobs for incompetence and for causing more damages. Kuboyasu and Kaido try to help him on another job.
17e	85	"Fierce Run! Runners Psi!"; Transliteration: "Gekisou! Runner's High!" (Japanese: 激走! ランナーズΨ!)	October 28, 2016
Saiki's class has to run a 10-kilometer marathon; Hairo tries to compete with Nendo, while Kaido is just trying to complete it.
18a	86	"Teruhashi's Second Visit to the Saiki Residence"; Transliteration: "Teruhashi-san no Saiki-ke Saihou" (Japanese: 照橋さんの斉木家Ψ訪)	October 31, 2016
Kokomi visits the Saiki residence to take cooking lessons from Saiki's mother, but ends up spending time with Saiki and the neighbor kid Yuuta, who turns out to be Kokomi's one flaw.
18b	87	"It's a Piece of Cake! The Straw Millionaire"; Transliteration: "Ocha no Ko Saisai! Warashibe Chouja" (Japanese: お茶の子ΨΨ！わらしべ長者)	November 1, 2016
When Saiki lacks the funds to pay off a meal, he uses a technique called Straw Millionaire, which involves exchanging items with others of a similar but slightly increased value via teleportation. This have disastrous effects with the other characters.
18c	88	"Transformation! Super Size"; Transliteration: "Henkei! Super Size" (Japanese: 変形！スーパーΨズ)	November 2, 2016
When the cat Amp chokes on a piece of Saiki's father's model robot, Saiki shrinks his size in order to retrieve the part. But Saiki can not change back to normal size until an hour's time is up, and he gets attacked by a cockroach.
18d	89	"He Should Repeat the Grade"; Transliteration: "Saikyouiku no Susume" (Japanese: Ψ教育のススメ)	November 3, 2016
Kongo is a delinquent third-year student bully at PK Academy, but will be held back a grade unless he changes his ways.
18e	90	"Max Excitement! Karaoke Party"; Transliteration: "Tension Saikouchou! Karaoke Kai" (Japanese: テンションΨ高潮！カラオケ会)	November 4, 2016
When Saiki's class goes out for karaoke, Saiki takes the opportunity to order a chocolate parfait before it is his turn to sing.
19a	91	"Hurray! Tsundere Grandpa"; Transliteration: "Banzai! Tsundere ojīchan" (Japanese: 万Ψ！ツンデレおじいちゃん)	November 14, 2016
Saiki goes to his grandparents' house while on vacation with his family, and has to deal with his grandfather who has trouble showing his true emotions.
19b	92	"Hip, Hip, Hurray! Tsundere Grandpa"; Transliteration: "Banbanzai! Tsundere Ojīchan" (Japanese: 万万Ψ！ツンデレおじいちゃん)	November 15, 2016
Saiki's grandfather is still secretly happy about his daughter and grandson coming over to visit.
19c	93	"Welcome to the Farthest Amusement Park!"; Transliteration: "Saihate no Yūenchi e yōkoso!" (Japanese: Ψ果ての遊園地へようこそ！)	November 16, 2016
Saiki and his family go to a run-down amusement park that is falling apart. After Saiki and his father ride a roller coaster, Saiki's grandfather gets jealous and rides with Saiki on the ferris wheel.
19d	94	"See you again! Saying Goodbye to the Grandparents"; Transliteration: "Saichen! Sofubo to no Wakare" (Japanese: Ψ見（サイチェン）！祖父母との別れ)	November 17, 2016
Saiki's vacation at his grandparents house comes to an end, but Saiki's grandfather tries to do whatever he can to get Saiki and his family to stay. Saiki's parents reveal that Saiki has psychic powers.
19e	95	"Congratulations on the Video Game Release! Kunio Saito's Horror Stories"; Transliteration: "Shuku gēmu-ka! Saitō kunio no Kaidan" (Japanese: 祝ゲーム化！斉藤邦夫のχ談)	November 18, 2016
Saiki wants to play a video game called Kunio Saito's Horror Stories (a parody of the related Saiki video game release), but he has to make it home safely and without hearing spoilers. When he encounters his schoolmates or family members he gets a selection of video game choices to pick.
20a	96	"Take Advantage of the Talent! Toritsuka's Plan to Get Popular"; Transliteration: "Sainō o Kushiseyo! Toritsuka Moteo Keikaku" (Japanese: Ψ能を駆使せよ！鳥束モテ男計画)	November 21, 2016
Toritsuka has become popular with the girls by letting ghosts possess him and show off their many talents, but things go wrong when the ghosts want to possess him during his big date with the group of girls while Saiki changes into a female to explain to him what's going on.
20b	97	"Use Your Smarts! The PK Occult Club"; Transliteration: "Saichi o Ikase! Pīkei Okaruto-bu" (Japanese: Ψ知をいかせ！PKオカルト部)	November 22, 2016
Toritsuka tries to create his own school club in order to attract girls. He creates an Occult Club, which brings in a creepy-looking girl, and also Kaido and Chiyo. Saiki uses the situation to check whether misattribution of arousal works.
20c	98	"The Worst Cooks"; Transliteration: "Saitei no Ryōrinin" (Japanese: Ψ低の料理人)	November 23, 2016
Saiki's class has to make crepes, but Saiki discovers his partners Kaido and Hairo have no cooking abilities.
20d	99	"Court is in Session! Kokomins Trial!"; Transliteration: "Kaitei! Kokominzu Saiban!" (Japanese: 開廷！ここみんズΨ判！)	November 24, 2016
Saiki is abducted by members of the Teruhashi Fan Club, who are bothered that Saiki has been spending way too much time with Kokomi.
20e	100	"Horror! The Disastrous ___th Episode of the Anime"; Transliteration: "Kyoufu! Anime Dai *****-wa no Sainan" (Japanese: 恐怖！アニメ第○話のΨ難)	November 25, 2016
While walking with Kaido and Nendo, Saiki notices that everyone seems to be talking about things that are connected to the number 100, (Note: In Asian counting systems, numbers are traditionally grouped into ten thousands instead of thousands, thus one million is 100 ten thousands) but he cannot quite figure out why.
21a	101	"Here Comes the Mad Scientist! (Part 1)"; Transliteration: "Maddo Saientisuto Arawaru! (Zenpen)" (Japanese: マッドΨエンティスト現る！（前編）)	November 28, 2016
When Saiki's hairpin is broken, Saiki is unable to control his powers where all this powers are amplified. The Saikis have to resort to contact Kusuo's big brother Kusuke.
21b	102	"Here Comes the Mad Scientist! (Part 2)"; Transliteration: "Maddo Saientisuto Arawaru! (Chūhen)" (Japanese: マッドΨエンティスト現る！（中編）)	November 29, 2016
The Saiki family goes to London to get the control device fixed by Kusuke, but get sidetracked by Kusuo's parents sightseeing. Kusuo explains why the brothers dislike each other. When Saiki's dad lost the parts, Kusuke uses his deductions to find it and fix it.
21c	103	"Here Comes the Mad Scientist! (Part 3)"; Transliteration: "Maddo Saientisuto Arawaru! (Kōhen)" (Japanese: マッドΨエンティスト現る！（後編）)	November 30, 2016
Kusuke shares his back story about how he's never beaten his little brother at anything, so he comes up with a challenge to beat him.
21d	104	"Run for It! A Battle of Wits"; Transliteration: "Gekisō! Sainō Batoru" (Japanese: 激走！Ψ能バトル)	December 1, 2016
Saiki, Nendo, and Kaido play a game of tag in London in which Kusuo must evade Kusuke for three hours.
21e	105	"Please at Least Be Quiet in the Art Museum"; Transliteration: "Bijutsukan de wa Saiteigen O-shizuka ni" (Japanese: 美術館ではΨ低限お静かに)	December 2, 2016
Saiki, Nendo, and Kaido go to an art museum in London. Kaido tries to overanalyze the modern art pieces when Nendo makes his own drawing, which gets the approval of the curator.
22a	106	"Summer Break! The Occult Club training camp" Transliteration: "Natsuyasumimae no Sainan Natsuyasumi Massaichū! Okaruto-bu Gasshuku Hen" (Japanese: 夏休み前のΨ難 夏休み真っΨ中！オカルト部合宿編)	December 5, 2016
With summer break coming, Saiki tries to decline participating in the plans brought up by his schoolmates.
22b	107	"Summer Break! The Tennis Club training camp" Transliteration: "Natsuyasumi Massaichū! Tenisu-bu Gasshuku Hen" (Japanese: 夏休み真っΨ中！テニス部合宿編)	December 6, 2016
The Occult Club holds a test of courage in a forest, but the random pairings are not what the members expect. After that, Saiki's off to the Tennis Club's training camp.
22c	108	"Summer Break! Clinical Testing Job"; Transliteration: "Natsuyasumi Massaichū! Chiken Baito Hen" (Japanese: 夏休み真っΨ中！治験バイト編)	December 7, 2016
Nendo teams up with Saiki in a tennis match against Hairo. Then Saiki and Nendo join Mera in a clinical testing job but the medicines have weird side effects for Mera and Nendo.
22d	109	"Summer Break! License training camp" Transliteration: "Natsuyasumi Massaichū! Menkyo Gasshuku Hen" (Japanese: 夏休み真っΨ中！免許合宿編)	December 8, 2016
Saiki discovers the truth behind the side effects. He then joins Kaido and Kuboyasu at the motorcycle license training camp.
22e	110	"Summer Break! A Date with Teruhashi"; Transliteration: "Natsuyasumi Massaichū! Teruhashi Deito Hen" (Japanese: 夏休み真っΨ中！照橋デート編)	December 9, 2016
On the last day of summer break, Saiki goes on a date with Teruhashi at the amusement park. However, Saiki brings Yuuta along, who wants to see a hero show in which the villain "abducts" Teruhashi.
23a	111	"The Heir to A Conglomerate Makes His Appearance"; Transliteration: "Saibatsu no Onzōshi Arawaru!" (Japanese: Ψ閥の御曹司現る！)	December 12, 2016
Metori Saiko, an arrogantly rich transfer student, wants to woo Kokomi. It seems like a great deal for her except that she has feelings for Saiki, and accidentally blurts out that she loves Saiki.
23b	112	"Break through the Overwhelming Financial Power!"; Transliteration: "Attōteki Sairyoku o Uchiyabure!" (Japanese: 圧倒的Ψ力を打ち破れ！)	December 13, 2016
When Kokomi turns down Saiko's love confession, Saiko starts making life difficult for Kokomi and Saiki's family and friends.
23c	113	"Tsundere Grandpa Returns!"; Transliteration: "Sairai! Tsundere Ojī-chan" (Japanese: Ψ来！ツンデレおじいちゃん)	December 14, 2016
Saiki's grandparents come and visit Saiki's family. When they all go out, Saiki's grandfather's mean behavior towards his father leads him to be left alone in a strange place when he meets Nendo.
23d	114	"Holding a Halloween Party"; Transliteration: "Kaisai Harowinpātī" (Japanese: 開Ψハロウィンパーティー)	December 15, 2016
Kaido invites his friends to a Halloween party at his place, but the guys have no clue as to its associated traditions.
23e	115	"The Saiko Family's Unbeatable Financial Power"; Transliteration: "Saiko Ichizoku Muteki no Sairyoku" (Japanese: 才虎一族無敵のΨ力)	December 16, 2016
In order to gain control his classmates, Saiko takes Nendo out to a fancy restaurant and then offers to pay Nendo a large sum of money to be his underling, but Nendo would rather just be friends and finds helping people to be much more important.
24a	116	"Talent Blossoms?! Melancholy of A Popular Magician"; Transliteration: "Sainō Kaika! ? Ninki Majishan no Yūutsu" (Japanese: Ψ能開花！？人気マジシャンの憂鬱)	December 19, 2016
Saiki learns that the magician Chouno has become fairly popular with a new stage show, but Saiki learns it is more of a comedy show.
24b	117	"An Exercise in Runaway Delusion"; Transliteration: "Bōsō Mōsō Ekusasaizu" (Japanese: 暴走妄想エクサΨズ)	December 20, 2016
Chiyo has gained an enormous amount of weight, so Saiki tries to help by implanting Kaido's voice to motivate her.
24c	118	"Break-time Disaster"; Transliteration: "Yasumi Jikan no Sainan" (Japanese: 休み時間のΨ難)	December 21, 2016
Saiki is constantly bothered by his schoolmates and others during his ten-minute break. Saiki's classmates are ignoring Saiki, but he discovers that it's because they are planning a surprise birthday party for him.
24d	119	"Crushed! Surprise Party (Part 1)"; Transliteration: "Funsai! Sapuraizu Pātī (zenpen)" (Japanese: 粉Ψ！サプライズパーティー（前編）)	December 22, 2016
Saiki watches as his friends plan a surprise birthday party, but the date is actually his father's birthday. They discuss the gifts they will give him. When Saiki leaves early, his friends go to his house and surprise him, but Saiki has substituted his father.
24e	120	"Crushed! Surprise Party (Part 2)"; Transliteration: "Funsai! Sapuraizu Pātī (kōhen)" (Japanese: 粉Ψ！サプライズパーティー（後編）)	December 23, 2016
Kusuo tells his father to continue to pretend to be him so that his friends don't feel bad about having celebrating a birthday party on the wrong birthday.

=== Season 2 ===
No.	Title	Original release date
1	"Restarting! Everyday Life, "As Usual""; Transliteration: "Saikai! "Itsumodōri" no Nichijō" (Japanese: Ψ開!"いつも通り"の日常)	January 17, 2018
1	"Another Christmas Challenge!"; Transliteration: "Sai Charenji! Kurisumasu" (Japanese: Ψチャレンジ!クリスマス)	January 17, 2018
1	"First Experiences of the Year are Important"; Transliteration: "Shinnen Saisho ga Ichiban Daiji" (Japanese: 新年Ψ初が一番大事)	January 17, 2018
1	"Courtside Love Game"; Transliteration: "Kōtosaido no Rabugeimu" (Japanese: コートΨドのラブゲーム)	January 17, 2018
1	"Dessert Buffet Disaster"; Transliteration: "Suiitsu Baikingu no Sainan" (Japanese: スイーツバイキングのΨ難)	January 17, 2018
Season two begins one week after the end of season one in in-universe time, though after one year in real time. Time is dedicated to reviewing the characters and their personalities after the long hiatus, as all of them come together to annoy Kusuo at his desk. Kusuo's family and friends try to celebrate Christmas with at Kusuo's house, while he does his best to avoid all of them. On New Year's Day, Kusuo watches various television shows, all of which come to feature his friends and family in some way. Toritsuka joins Haito's tennis team in the hopes of wooing a fellow tennis player. Kusuo transforms into a girl to attend a women-only buffet and is pressed by his female acquaintances who come close to discovering his identity.
2	"FirstHand Science Fiction 1"; Transliteration: "Taiken Saiensufikushon 1" (Japanese: 体験Ψエンスフィクション1)	January 24, 2018
2	"FirstHand Science Fiction 2"; Transliteration: "Taiken Saiensufikushon 2" (Japanese: 体験Ψエンスフィクション2)	January 24, 2018
2	"FirstHand Science Fiction 3"; Transliteration: "Taiken Saiensufikushon 3" (Japanese: 体験Ψエンスフィクション3)	January 24, 2018
2	"Sup! Love Challenge"; Transliteration: "Osu! Koi no Hatashijō" (Japanese: 押忍!恋の果たし状)	January 24, 2018
2	"Fashion Sense out of Stock"; Transliteration: "Fasshon Sensu no Zaiko Nashi" (Japanese: ファッションセンスのΨ庫なし)	January 24, 2018
On the eve of their anniversary, Kusuo's parents tell an unwilling Kusuo about their first meeting, after which Kusuo unintentionally goes back to that time, changing it so that they never met. Kusuo then attempts to right the timeline, despite his father's timidness and Nendo's father's attempts to get with his mother. Upon returning to the future after seemingly correcting things, Kusuo finds that his actions caused a post-apocalyptic world. Again, he tries to make things right. Kuboyasu receives a love letter which turns out to be a trick by a group of gangsters to get him to fight them. Kusuo and his friends go shopping for clothes and end up playing dress-up with Teruhashi.
3	"MidWinter Disaster"; Transliteration: "Mafuyu no Sainan" (Japanese: 真冬のΨ難)	January 31, 2018
3	"The Saiko Conglomerate Home Visit"; Transliteration: "Saiko Zaibatsu Otaku Hōmon" (Japanese: Ψ虎財閥お宅訪問)	January 31, 2018
3	"Come On Over to Saiko Land!"; Transliteration: "Oide yo! Saikō Rando" (Japanese: おいでよ！Ψコーランド)	January 31, 2018
3	"Invincible Disaster Prevention Measures"; Transliteration: "Muteki no Bōsai Taisaku" (Japanese: 無敵の防Ψ対策)	January 31, 2018
3	"Congratulations on Your Graduation!"; Transliteration: "Sotsugyō Omedetōgozaimasu!" (Japanese: 卒業おめでとうごΨます！)	January 31, 2018
The weather is freezing and Kusuo's classmates begin are forced to deal with a broken heater, with nobody wanting to leave due to a famous comedian visiting that day. Kusuo and his friends are made to visit Saiko's house, and they all react to his wealth in different ways as he tries desperately to impress them. After they leave, Saiko renovates his estate to appeal to them. On a snow day, Kusuo is forced to watch his friends play to make sure nothing happens to them. Kusuo attends the senior graduation ceremony and listens as various students give speeches.
4	"The Disastrous Life of Imu Rifuta"; Transliteration: "Rifuta Imu no Sainan" (Japanese: 梨歩田依舞のΨ難)	February 7, 2018
4	"April Fools' Deceit!"; Transliteration: "Azamuke! Saipuriru Fūru" (Japanese: 欺け！Ψプリルフール)	February 7, 2018
4	"Spring's Ultimate Weapon"; Transliteration: "Haru no Saishūheiki" (Japanese: 春のΨ終兵器)	February 7, 2018
4	"Recycle! Trash Cleanup Competition"; Transliteration: "Risaikuru! Gomihiroi Taikai" (Japanese: リΨクル！ゴミ拾い大会)	February 7, 2018
4	"Cutting through the Silence, The Ghost in the Music Room"; Transliteration: "Seijyaku Kirisaita Ongakushitsu no Yūrei" (Japanese: 静寂切りΨた音楽室の幽霊)	February 7, 2018
Beautiful new student Imu Rifita arrives at school, ready to take control by impressing every boy, but finds Teruhashi stands in the way of her plan. When Kaido witness Saiki's powers on April Fools, nobody is convinced that it was not a prank. Kusuo's allergies start flaring, with disastrous consequences. Everyone bands together to clean up the rubbish polluting the town, although they're secretly all there for the 1,000,000 yen prize. Reita asks Kusuo for his help getting rid of a piano ghost haunting the music room.
5	"Rematch! Rifuta VS Teruhashi"; Transliteration: "Saisen! Rifuta VS Teruhashi" (Japanese: Ψ戦！梨歩田VS照橋)	February 14, 2018
5	"Gifts of the Magi"; Transliteration: "Kensai no Okurimono" (Japanese: 賢Ψの贈り物)	February 14, 2018
5	"The Lost Hamster with a Kansai Dialect"; Transliteration: "Maigo no Hamusutā wa Kansaiben de Shaberu" (Japanese: 迷子のハムスターは関Ψ弁で喋る)	February 14, 2018
5	"The Transient Miniature Animal"; Transliteration: "Hōrō! Minisaizu Animaru" (Japanese: 放浪！ミニΨズアニマル)	February 14, 2018
5	"Massage Disaster"; Transliteration: "Massāji no sainan" (Japanese: マッサージのΨ難)	February 14, 2018
Deducing Teruhashi has a crush on Kusuo, Imu goes after him, unaware this is Kusuo's plan to remove them both from his life. Kusuo's parents need to find presents for one another. Kusuo and Amp the cat help a lost hamster return to her owners. Afterwards, Kusuo passes the hamster around his friends, to find her new owner. Kusuo's parents try increasingly stranger things to help loosen his tense shoulders.
6	"The Saiko Conglomerate's Luxurious Cruise"; Transliteration: "Saiko Saibatsu no Gōka Kurūzu" (Japanese: Ψ虎財閥の豪華クルーズ)	February 21, 2018
6	"The Shipwreck of Saiki Kusuo 1"; Transliteration: "Saiki Kusuo no Sōnan 1" (Japanese: 斉木楠雄の遭難１)	February 21, 2018
6	"The Shipwreck of Saiki Kusuo 2"; Transliteration: "Saiki Kusuo no Sōnan 2" (Japanese: 斉木楠雄の遭難２)	February 21, 2018
6	"The Shipwreck of Saiki Kusuo 3"; Transliteration: "Saiki Kusuo no Sōnan 3" (Japanese: 斉木楠雄の遭難３)	February 21, 2018
6	"The Shipwreck of Saiki Kusuo 4"; Transliteration: "Saiki Kusuo no Sōnan 4" (Japanese: 斉木楠雄の遭難４)	February 21, 2018
Saiko agrees to take everyone to his private island, but the yacht has some problems, caused by Kusuo's seasickness. The group struggle to adapt to the island, and so Kusuo uses his teleportation to have helpful items mysteriously wash ashore. Everybody bands together to build a raft, which Kusuo secretly fixes.
7	"The Shipwreck of Saiki Kusuo 5"; Transliteration: "Saiki Kusuo no Sōnan 5" (Japanese: 斉木楠雄の遭難５)	February 28, 2018
7	"The Shipwreck of Saiki Kusuo 6"; Transliteration: "Saiki Kusuo no Sōnan 6" (Japanese: 斉木楠雄の遭難６)	February 28, 2018
7	"The Shipwreck of Saiki Kusuo 7"; Transliteration: "Saiki Kusuo no Sōnan 7" (Japanese: 斉木楠雄の遭難７)	February 28, 2018
7	"The PK Academy Press Club Guillotine"; Transliteration: "Danzai Seyo! PK Gakuen Shinbun-bu" (Japanese: 断Ψせよ！PK学園新聞部)	February 28, 2018
7	"Farewell! The Last Day of Summer Break"; Transliteration: "Saraba! Natsuyasumi Saishūbi" (Japanese: さらば！夏休みΨ終日)	February 28, 2018
Feeling guilt for the shipwreck, Saiko refuses to eat, causing problems. Saiko insists that they choose who should be left on the island and who should go on the raft. So they won't be split into two groups, Saiki reshapes the island to be teleported to one closer to Japan. Their shipwreck has become a sensation, Saiki has to dodge all of the new attention and the libellous press club. Aren, Nendo, and Kaidou attempt to help Saiki with his picture diary Summer homework.
8	"A Totally Bad News Transfer Student Appears!"; Transliteration: "Chōuzai! Geroyaba Tenkōsei Arawaru!" (Japanese: チョーウΨ！ゲロヤバ転校生現る！)	March 7, 2018
8	"Escape the Aural Sight!"; Transliteration: "Ōrasaito o Kaikugure!" (Japanese: オーラΨトをかいくぐれ！)	March 7, 2018
8	"The Circumstances of Delicate Children"; Transliteration: "Sensai na Kodomo no Jijōsea" (Japanese: 繊Ψなコドモの事情)	March 7, 2018
8	"Another Time Leap Challenge!"; Transliteration: "Sai Charenji! Taimurīpu" (Japanese: Ψチャレンジ！タイムリープ)	March 7, 2018
8	"The Disastrous Life of Kokomi Teruhashi (Note: Adapts a chapter originally published in WSJ sister magazine Cocohana.)"; Transliteration: "Teruhashi Kokomi no Sainan" (Japanese: 照橋心美のΨ難)	March 7, 2018
A new transfer student named Aiura Mikoto arrives, whose a Gyaru and openly psychic, gladly reading everyone's fortunes. Furthermore, she is determined to find her soulmate, who she knows has pink hair, a power, and the initials SK. Saiki disguises himself as a 5-year-old to help Yuuta against bullies. Saiki accidentally traps himself in a time loop. Teruhashi recruits as many men as she can to help her track down Saiki.
9	"Psychics Should Exercise Extreme Caution (Part 1)"; Transliteration: "Chō Nōryoku-sha ni wa saishin no Chūi o (Zenpen)" (Japanese: 超能力者にはΨ心の注意を（前編）)	March 14, 2018
9	"Psychics Should Exercise Extreme Caution (Part 2)"; Transliteration: "Chō Nōryoku-sha ni wa saishin no Chūi o (Kōhen)" (Japanese: 超能力者にはΨ心の注意を（後編）)	March 14, 2018
9	"The Psychic Circus of Dreams (Part 1)"; Transliteration: "Yume no saikikkusākasu (Zenpen)" (Japanese: 夢のΨキックサーカス（前編）)	March 14, 2018
9	"The Psychic Circus of Dreams (Part 2)"; Transliteration: "Yume no saikikkusākasu (Kōhen)" (Japanese: 夢のΨキックサーカス（後編）)	March 14, 2018
9	"Hope You Get Well Soon!"; Transliteration: "Mubyōsokusai oinori itashimasu! !" (Japanese: 無病息Ψお祈り致します！！)	March 14, 2018
After Chiyo agrees to help Aiura find her soulmate, Saiki has to come up with different ways to deceive her. Saiki and Aiura work together to prevent her vision of Chiyo's death coming true. After Chouno is in an accident, Saiki is forced to take over his magic act. Saiki has to continue the disastrous magic show, after learning stopping will cause a terrible incident. The school is sent into chaos after Teruhashi catches a cold.
10	"Preventing A Scam!"; Transliteration: "Fusege! Sagi Hanzai" (Japanese: 防げ！詐欺犯Ψ)	March 21, 2018
10	"The Saiki Family Reunion! (Part 1)"; Transliteration: "Saiki-ke Shuketsu! ! (Zenpen)" (Japanese: Ψ木家集結！！（前編）)	March 21, 2018
10	"The Saiki Family Reunion! (Part 2)"; Transliteration: "Saiki-ke Shuketsu! ! (Kōhen)" (Japanese: Ψ木家集結！！（後編）)	March 21, 2018
10	"The Rural Mad Scientist"; Transliteration: "Inaka no Maddo Saientisuto" (Japanese: 田舎のマッドΨエンティスト)	March 21, 2018
10	"PK Academy Psykickers Assemble!"; Transliteration: "Tsudou! PK Gakuen Saikikkāzu" (Japanese: 集う！PK学園Ψキッカーズ)	March 21, 2018
Saiki's Grandpa is tricked by a scam, only for it later revealed to be Kusuke. At a festival, Kusuke challenges Kusuo to a series of challenges. After moving in with his grandparents, Kusuke makes many mechanical advancements to them and the neighborhood. A competition develops between Reita and Aiura over who is Saiki's favorite psychic sidekick.
11	"An Ugly Bolt Out of the Blue"; Transliteration: "Busaiku, Seiten no Hekireki" (Japanese: ブΨク、青天の霹靂)	March 28, 2018
11	"Conceal Your Hidden Power!"; Transliteration: "Kakureta Sainō o Miidasareruna!" (Japanese: 隠れたΨ能を見出されるな！)	March 28, 2018
11	"A Fight Between the Two Worst People"; Transliteration: "Saiaku Dōshi no Tatakai" (Japanese: Ψ悪同士の戦い)	March 28, 2018
11	"A Miraculously Average Guy Appears!"; Transliteration: "Kiseki no Bonsai Arawanru!" (Japanese: 奇跡の凡Ψ現る！)	March 28, 2018
11	"Disaster in the Library Room"; Transliteration: "Toshoshitsu no Sainan" (Japanese: 図書室のΨ難)	March 28, 2018
Nendou receives a love letter. The entire class has to take a judo lesson. Teruhashi and Kusuke both go to the Saiki Residence for New Years, and Saiki joins with Teruhashi to get rid of his brother. Saiki becomes interested in Satou Hiroshi, the most average student in the entire school. Saiki accidentally uses psychometry on his library book to see the love story of the prior owners, only to enjoy the story and take out more books to find the ending.
12	"A Strong Declaration of Friendship"; Transliteration: "Dokidoki Kousai Sengen" (Japanese: ドキドキ交Ψ宣言)	April 4, 2018
12	"The Best Wing Girl!?"; Transliteration: "Saikyō no Kyōryoku-sha! ?" (Japanese: Ψ強の協力者！？)	April 4, 2018
12	"The Adventures of Riki Jr. No.2, Small and Smart"; Transliteration: "Chiisai kedo Kashikoi! Koriki 2-gō no Bōken" (Japanese: 小Ψけど賢い！小力２号の冒険)	April 4, 2018
12	"The Disastrous Life of Hiroshi Satou"; Transliteration: "Satō Hiroshi no Sainan" (Japanese: 佐藤ひろしの災難)	April 4, 2018
12	"Trim a Bit Off the Sides"; Transliteration: "Saido wa Karuku Asoba Sete" (Japanese: Ψドは軽く遊ばせて)	April 4, 2018
Rifuta tries to profess her love for Kusuo in an effort to win against school idol Kokomi Teruhashi, to prevent her Aiura and Kusuo pretend to date. Rifuta takes Teruhashi and Chiyo to a mixer, where Saiki eavesdrops to help Teruhashi's prospective new boyfriends. Nendo's pet hamster, Riki Jr No. 2, wreaks havoc while loose inside the school. Saiki continues to watch over the most ordinary student, Hiroshi Satou, and becomes determined to befriend him. Saiki's friends decide to all get haircuts, and Nendo's new one attracts attention.
13	"Chisato Mera's Reunion (Part 1)"; Transliteration: "Mera Chisato no Saikai (Zenpen)" (Japanese: 目良千里のΨ会（前編）)	April 11, 2018
13	"Chisato Mera's Reunion (Part 2)"; Transliteration: "Mera Chisato no Saikai (Kōhen)" (Japanese: 目良千里のΨ会（後編）)	April 11, 2018
13	"An Abnormality with Silent Cyborg"; Transliteration: "Sairento Saibōgu no Ihen" (Japanese: サイレントΨボーグの異変)	April 11, 2018
13	"The Ultimate Spot Claimers"; Transliteration: "Tsudoe! Saikyō no Basho to Risuto" (Japanese: 集え！Ψ強の場所取リスト)	April 11, 2018
13	"Preface to the Final Episode"; Transliteration: "Saishūkai e no Maefuri o Shiyou" (Japanese: Ψ終回への前フリをしよう)	April 11, 2018
Aiura and Kusuo help patronize Chisato at a maid cafe. Aiura fortune-tells that Chisato's father is in Tokyo. Kusuo leaves but encounters Chisato's father who is planning to bid Chisato farewell because he is being hunted by loan sharks, and is forced to take action when the sharks try to kidnap him. When bothered by the style change in one of his favorite manga stories, Kusuo discovers that his father has taken over as the artist's editor, and has introduced really bad changes. The guys fail to get a spot at the local park for cherry blossom viewing, at least until Kokomi visits. Kusuo teleports to a remote place to test his growing psychic abilities; revealing it is mainly to try to stop a supervolcano in Japan from erupting. He also reveals that the world is in a time loop - citing the Christmas, New Years, and Graduation episodes despite never moving from Year 2 - as he restores it every time he fails to stop the volcano.
14	"The Saiko Family's Greatest Trial"; Transliteration: "Saiko Ichizoku no Saidai no Shiren" (Japanese: 才虎一族のΨ大の試練)	April 18, 2018
14	"Psychic Sidekicks"; Transliteration: "Saikikku Saidokikkusu" (Japanese: サイキックΨドキックス)	April 18, 2018
14	"The Occult Club's Final Scream Scheme"; Transliteration: "Okaruto-bu Saishū Zekkyō Keikaku" (Japanese: オカルト部Ψ終絶叫計画)	April 18, 2018
14	"Love Score Showdown"; Transliteration: "Aijō Saiten Taiketsu" (Japanese: 愛情Ψ点対決)	April 18, 2018
14	"The Master Artist's Classroom"; Transliteration: "Tensai Gahaku no Kaiga Kyōshitsu" (Japanese: 天Ψ画伯の絵画教室)	April 18, 2018
Metori Saiko tries to go a day without relying on his family money. Mikoto Aiura and Reita Toritsuka go on adventures with Kusuo as part of the PK Academy Psychic Kids. The principal asks Kusuo to report on the Occult Club of which he is president; she discovers that Chiyo and Arisu have been active and involved in some girly relationship talk and some actual occultish things. Kusuo's parents compete against each other who loves the other more. In art class, Kusuo and Kokomi have to draw each other.
15	"Rebuilding the Baseball Team! (Part 1)"; Transliteration: "Yakyūbu o Saiken Seyo! (Zenpen)" (Japanese: 野球部をΨ建せよ！（前編）)	April 25, 2018
15	"Rebuilding the Baseball Team! (Part 2)"; Transliteration: "Yakyūbu o Saiken Seyo! (Kōhen)" (Japanese: 野球部をΨ建せよ！（後編）)	April 25, 2018
15	"Eat Your Vegetables Too! The Yakiniku Epilogue"; Transliteration: "Yasai mo Tabeyou! Yakiniku Kai" (Japanese: 野Ψも食べよう！ 焼肉回)	April 25, 2018
15	"Dad's New Job!?"; Transliteration: "Tōsan no Saishūshoku! ?" (Japanese: 父さんのΨ就職！？)	April 25, 2018
15	"Birthday Present Demands"; Transliteration: "Saisoku! Tanjōbi Purezento" (Japanese: Ψ促！誕生日プレゼント)	April 25, 2018
When Nendo goes to help the baseball club, Kusuo discovers that the club is full of sports manga character archetypes and cliches, drawn their by Satou Hiroshi, including challenging a stronger club in a tournament in order to save the club. But things get complicated with the presence of Nendo who disrupts the cliche story. After the game, the club challenges another team in eating yakiniku (Japanese barbecue). Kusuo's father loses his job. Kusuke gets him a job literally licking shoes, which becomes somewhat popular. Chisato celebrates her birthday by gathering gifts from her class until she gets upset from Kokomi's gift, causing the others to take back their gifts.
16	"If You're Looking For a Boyfriend..."; Transliteration: "Kōsai Aite o Sagasu nara..." (Japanese: 交Ψ相手をさがすなら…)	May 2, 2018
16	"The Best Present For a Beloved Sister"; Transliteration: "Saiai no imōto ni Saikō no Purezento o" (Japanese: Ψ愛の妹にΨ高のプレゼントを)	May 2, 2018
16	"The Spirit Medium Debuts Again"; Transliteration: "Reinōryokusha Sai-debyū" (Japanese: 霊能力者Ψデビュー)	May 2, 2018
16	"The High Tech Soldier, 100 Yen Man!"; Transliteration: "Saiteku Senshi Hyakuenman!" (Japanese: Ψテク戦士１００円マン！)	May 2, 2018
16	"Inside the Secret Base"; Transliteration: "Sīkuretto Beisu Insaido" (Japanese: シークレット・ベース・インΨド)	May 2, 2018
Imu Rifuta asks Kusuo to find a boyfriend for her. Chiyo tries to help as well. Kokomi's brother Makoto gets Saiki to go shopping with him to buy a birthday present for Kokomi. The Occult Club explore a supposedly haunted abandoned building, but Toritsuka finds it strange that it doesn't have the usual number of ghosts. Hoping to save up for a newly advertised jelly maker, Kusuo turns to doing all sorts of jobs for 100 yen at a time. Shun shows the guys his secret base tent site.
17	"He's Back! The Brother's Five Directives"; Transliteration: "Saihō! Ani kara no Itsutsu no Shirei" (Japanese: Ψ訪！兄からの５つの指令)	May 9, 2018
17	"Let's Go to the Zoo!"; Transliteration: "Sai mo iru! Dōbutsuen ni Ikou" (Japanese: Ψもいる！動物園に行こう)	May 9, 2018
17	"The Disastrous Work of a New Manga Author"; Transliteration: "Shinjin Mangakka no Sainan" (Japanese: 新人漫画家のΨ難)	May 9, 2018
17	"The Disastrous Lives of the Kaidou Brothers"; Transliteration: "Kaidō Kyōdai no Sainan" (Japanese: 海藤兄弟のΨ難)	May 9, 2018
17	"A Girl's Makeover"; Transliteration: "Imēji Chenji Sai Gāru" (Japanese: イメージチェンジΨガール)	May 9, 2018
Kusuke threatens to publicize Kusuo's secret unless Kusuo can run around the city to solve a series of puzzles and collect a bunch of cards. Kusuo takes Yuta to the zoo and telepathically talks with the animals. Kusuo listens in on his dad's visit to his favorite manga artist's workplace and watches him critique an aspiring new manga artist's work. Shun worries that his little brother Toki's idolizing him would be shattered when he meets with Kusuo and Riki. Jealous of Makoto's interactions with Kusuo, Kokomi tries several radical makeovers in her hairstyle and personality.
18	"Touma Akechi, The Transfer Student Who Never Shuts Up"; Transliteration: "Uzai Tenkōsei! Akechi Tōma" (Japanese: うΨ転校生！明智透真)	May 16, 2018
18	"The Transfer Student's Still Talking!"; Transliteration: "Madamada Uzai! Tenkōsei" (Japanese: まだまだうΨ！転校生)	May 16, 2018
18	"Sweet Potato Digging Disaster"; Transliteration: "Satsumaimo Hori no Sainan" (Japanese: さつまいも掘りのΨ難)	May 16, 2018
18	"Putting The Mascot Character in Order"; Transliteration: "Masukotto Kyara no Taisai wo Totonoeyou" (Japanese: マスコットキャラの体Ψを整えよう)	May 16, 2018
18	"Metori Saiko's Listless Days"; Transliteration: "Saiko Metori no Taikutsuna Nichijō" (Japanese: Ψ虎芽斗吏の退屈な日常)	May 16, 2018
Kusuo's class meets a rather talkative transfer student named Touma Akechi. During lunch, they discover that Touma has extraordinary observational abilities, Touma reveals that he knows Kusuo from his childhood and asks Kusuo openly if he is a psychic. Kusuo feigns ignorance, so he asks Kusuo's friends. When Kusuo's class has to harvest potatoes, but Kusuo pretends to harvest in order not to encounter bugs, until Touma arrives. Amp is threatened by a cartoon-style looking cat that wins over the affections of Kusuo's parents. Irritated that his schoolmates aren't subservient like everyone else, Metori Saiko wants to quit the school.
19	"Class Disaster"; Transliteration: "Kurasu no Sainan" (Japanese: クラスのΨ難)	May 23, 2018
19	"The PK Academy Cultural Festival 1"; Transliteration: "Pīkei Gakuen Bunkasai 1" (Japanese: PK学園文化Ψ１)	May 23, 2018
19	"The PK Academy Cultural Festival 2"; Transliteration: "Pīkei Gakuen Bunkasai 2" (Japanese: PK学園文化Ψ２)	May 23, 2018
19	"The PK Academy Cultural Festival 3"; Transliteration: "Pīkei Gakuen Bunkasai 3" (Japanese: PK学園文化Ψ３)	May 23, 2018
19	"The PK Academy Cultural Festival 4"; Transliteration: "Pīkei Gakuen Bunkasai 4" (Japanese: PK学園文化Ψ４)	May 23, 2018
Kusuo's class has to choose two organizers for the school festival but not Hairo or other girl who did it last year. Kokomi manipulates the situation so that she is partnered with Kusuo and that the class will perform a play. Kusuo gets his friends to join them as they think of what kind of story to do, resulting in them sharing some fairy tales. They agree to do their own rendition of Momotaro. While cast in a minor part, Kusuo watches the dress rehearsal where he learns that Saiko has bought all the costumes and scenery in order to have a starring role, but Saiko withdraws his support when he learns Shun was trying to trick him. The class performs anyway without costumes, but when Kokomi arrives to wow the audience with her acting and Kusuo helps hypnotize the group into thinking they are still wearing costumes.
20	"Impersonation Via Hypnosis (Part 1)"; Transliteration: "Saimin Nōryoku de Narisumase! (Zenpen)" (Japanese: Ψ眠能力でなりすませ！（前編）)	May 30, 2018
20	"Impersonation Via Hypnosis (Part 2)"; Transliteration: "Saimin Nōryoku de Narisumase! (Kōhen)" (Japanese: Ψ眠能力でなりすませ！（後編）)	May 30, 2018
20	"High Expectations on the New, Fully Functional Mascot"; Transliteration: "Kinō Manman! Kitai no Nyū Masukotto" (Japanese: 機能満Ψ！期待のニューマスコット)	May 30, 2018
20	"This Year's the Last Time! New Year's Eve"; Transliteration: "Kotoshi Saigo da! Ōmisoka" (Japanese: 今年Ψ後だ！大晦日)	May 30, 2018
20	"Silent New Year's"; Transliteration: "Sairento Oshōgatsu" (Japanese: Ψレントお正月)	May 30, 2018
When Kusuo's glasses break and he inadvertently turns Shun and Riki to stone, Kusuo asks his fellow psychics Reita and Aiura to impersonate them for 24 hours. Things get complicated when Reita as Shun runs into Chiyo at cram school, and Aiura as Riki is invited to go out to dinner with Chono. Kusuo's father is disillusioned that their robotic cat Warp is not as affectionate as he thought it would be, as most of its actions are just various functions. Shun hosts a New Year's Eve party, but the guys have trouble staying awake as they all had activities that kept them up earlier. The final segment, presented with no dialogue, shows Kusuo trying to have a low-key New Year's, but is pulled into activities with his friends.
21	"Chronicles of the Grandparents' Travels"; Transliteration: "Saihō! Sofubo Hōrōki" (Japanese: Ψ訪！祖父母放浪記)	June 6, 2018
21	"Returning the Favor, Toritsuka's Ascetic Fasting"; Transliteration: "Kari no Hensai! Toritsuka Danjiki shugyō" (Japanese: 借りの返Ψ！鳥束断食修行)	June 6, 2018
21	"A Misunderstanding Between Opposite Sex Friends (Part 1)"; Transliteration: "Surechigai Danjo Kōsai (Zenpen)" (Japanese: すれ違い男女交Ψ（前編）)	June 6, 2018
21	"A Misunderstanding Between Opposite Sex Friends (Part 2)"; Transliteration: "Surechigai Danjo Kōsai (Kōhen)" (Japanese: すれ違い男女交Ψ（後編）)	June 6, 2018
21	"A Big Scoop!"; Transliteration: "Tokudane o keisaiseyo!" (Japanese: 特ダネを掲Ψせよ！)	June 6, 2018
Kusuo's grandparents are lost on their way to visit. Kusuo is about to retrieve them, but then his grandfather meets Kokomi, while his grandmother meets Aiura. Both girls give a good impression to the grandparents as potential girlfriends. The temple staff put Reita Toritsuka on a three-day fast in which he cannot eat food, play video games, or read porn. Reita asks Saiki to help bring such things to him, but Saiki uses this chance to reform Reita. For Valentine's Day, Chiyo prepares homemade chocolate and a love note for Shun, but Nendo eats the chocolate. Shun reads the love note and, after thinking it's from another student, later interprets it as a secret message from Chiyo saying they should be sworn friends. However, when he miscommunicates this to Chiyo and leads her to believe that they are a couple. The Newspaper Club try to smear Kokomi by catching her being splashed on by a puddle.
22	"Choosing the Best Person to Walk Home With"; Transliteration: "Gekō Aite wa Sairyō no Sentaku o" (Japanese: 下校相手はΨ良の選択を)	June 13, 2018
22	"Details Wanted! The Super Idol's Secret"; Transliteration: "Shōsai Motomu! Sūpā Aidoru no Himitsu" (Japanese: 詳Ψ求む！スーパーアイドルの秘密)	June 13, 2018
22	"Division of Labor"; Transliteration: "Yakuwari Saibunka Keikaku" (Japanese: 役割Ψ分化計画)	June 13, 2018
22	"Facing the Unexpected (Part 1)"; Transliteration: "Hinichijō o Saikuseyo (Zenpen)" (Japanese: 非日常をΨ工せよ（前編）)	June 13, 2018
22	"Facing the Unexpected (Part 2)"; Transliteration: "Hinichijō o Saikuseyo (Kōhen)" (Japanese: 非日常をΨ工せよ（後編）)	June 13, 2018
When Kusuo, Shin, Riki, and Aren get in trouble for disrupting the peace while walking home from school, Kusuo decides to walk home with Hairo. He discovers Hairo tends to naturally help everyone in need along the way, culminating in stopping a criminal. Imu, who has been fan-obsessed with Lord Mugami (Kokomi's brother), asks Kusuo to take her to a location shoot, but Kokomi's brother thinks of Imu as Kusuo's girlfriend and wants to set up a double date. Kusuo sends one of his clones on an errand, but it runs into Riki. Touma reveals to Kusuo that he has been tailing him for the past six months and noticed four instances where he suspects Kusuo is a psychic, including the incidents with turning Riki and Shun into stone, the robbery rescue by Hairo, and the clone at the store. But the kicker is that he talked with the people who got in the way and concluded they were teleported there at the last minute to obstruct his view.
23	"Facing an Unusual Past 1"; Transliteration: "Hinichijō na Kako o Saikuseyo 1" (Japanese: 非日常な過去をΨ工せよ１)	June 20, 2018
23	"Facing an Unusual Past 2"; Transliteration: "Hinichijō na Kako o Saikuseyo 2" (Japanese: 非日常な過去をΨ工せよ２)	June 20, 2018
23	"Facing an Unusual Past 3"; Transliteration: "Hinichijō na Kako o Saikuseyo 3" (Japanese: 非日常な過去をΨ工せよ３)	June 20, 2018
23	"Facing an Unusual Past 4"; Transliteration: "Hinichijō na Kako o Saikuseyo 4" (Japanese: 非日常な過去をΨ工せよ４)	June 20, 2018
23	"Facing an Unusual Past 5"; Transliteration: "Hinichijō na Kako o Saikuseyo 5" (Japanese: 非日常な過去をΨ工せよ５)	June 20, 2018
Kusuo attempts multiple time travels to back when he was in second grade and when a student named Takashi had bullied Touma but young Kusuo had helped Touma in many ways (healing his wound, causing Takashi to spin around a bar, and causing a classroom mess), leading to Touma's suspicion that Kusuo was a psychic. However, the attempts either do not change the present situation, or have a butterfly effect leading to a post-apocalyptic world. He relents and tells Touma that he is indeed a psychic, and Touma thanks him for all his help.
24	"Trial of the Perfect Beautiful Girl"; Transliteration: "Sai o Minuke! Kanpeki Bishōjo no Shiren" (Japanese: Ψを見抜け！完璧美少女の試練)	June 27, 2018
24	"Make Your Investigation, Psykickers!"; Transliteration: "Chōsasuru! Saikikkāzu!" (Japanese: 調査する！Ψキッカーズ！)	June 27, 2018
24	"Disaster Back from the Holidays"; Transliteration: "Yasumiake no Sainan" (Japanese: 休み明けのΨ難)	June 27, 2018
24	"Remembering the Cast (Part 1)"; Transliteration: "Shūketsu! Omoide no Kyara Saitōjō (zenpen)" (Japanese: 集結！思い出のキャラΨ登場（前編）)	June 27, 2018
24	"Remembering the Cast (Part 2)"; Transliteration: "Shūketsu! Omoide no Kyara Saitōjō (Kouhen)" (Japanese: 集結！思い出のキャラΨ登場（後編）)	June 27, 2018
After Kokomi Teruhashi compliments a classmate on his new haircut, the rest of the boys all change parts of themselves in the hopes she will notice them. Teruhashi, determined to impress them all, exhausts herself in her attempts to keep everyone happy. Saiki tells Mikoto Aiura and Reita Toritsuka that Touma now knows he is a psychic, and they decide to judge Touma's worthiness before he can join the 'Psykickers'. Kusuo arrives back from Winter Break to discover all of his friends have radically changed their appearances. As Saiki goes about his day, he finds that all of the previous side-characters are in town.

=== Special ===
A one-hour special called The Disastrous Life of Saiki K.: Conclusion (Japanese: 斉木楠雄のΨ難 完結編, Hepburn: Saiki Kusuo no Ψ-nan: Kanketsu-hen) which is used as the finale of the Disastrous Life of Saiki K anime series aired on December 28, 2018. It adapts the last chapters published from Weekly Shonen Jump.

No.	Title	Original release date
1	"Everyone's Different Future Plans"; Transliteration: "Jūnintoiro, tasaina shinro" (Japanese: 十人十色、多Ψな進路)	December 28, 2018
1	"The Perfect Replica!? KusuΩ"; Transliteration: "Kanzen Saigen!? KusuΩ" (Japanese: 完全Ψ現!?楠Ω)	December 28, 2018
1	"Psychic Battle Outbreak!"; Transliteration: "Boppatsu! Saikikkubatoru" (Japanese: 勃発!Ψキックバトル)	December 28, 2018
1	"Psychic Battle Clash!"; Transliteration: "Gekitotsu! Saikikkubatoru" (Japanese: 激突!Ψキックバトル)	December 28, 2018
1	"The Final Showdown"; Transliteration: "Saito no tatakai" (Japanese: Ψ後の戦い)	December 28, 2018
Everyone decides what college they would like to attend, and their dream careers. Kusuke unveils his replacement robot 'Kusuomega' which he unleashes on the school. Kusuo, with help from Reita, desperately attempts to stop it, whilst concealing his psychic identity and avoiding the robots deadly defence mechanisms. After they destroy Kusuomega, Kusuke kidnaps and brainwashes Reita to possess Kusuo's body. With both of his plans now failed, Kusuke decides to take matters into his own hands, with a robot suit and a cat tank, with his prize being the activation of a trigger that reveals Kusuo's entire identity. Despite winning the fight, Kusuo decides to activate the trigger anyway, unaware it is a dud. Kusuke then offers him the opportunity to permanently remove his psychic powers with a new device.
2	"Planning out Specifics for the Trip"; Transliteration: "Ryokō keikaku no Shōsai o tsumeyou" (Japanese: 旅行計画の詳Ψを詰めよう)	December 28, 2018
2	"So much to see in Oshimai"; Transliteration: "Midokoro mansai! Oshimai kankō!" (Japanese: 見どころ満Ψ!忍舞観光!)	December 28, 2018
2	"Saving the World from the Apocalyptic Disaster"; Transliteration: "Saiakuno tensai kara sekai o kyūsai Seiyo!" (Japanese: Ψ悪の天Ψから世界を救Ψせよ!)	December 28, 2018
2	"The End of Saiki Kusuo (Part 1)"; Transliteration: "Saiki Kusuo no Saigo (Zenpen)" (Japanese: 斉木楠雄のΨ後（前編）)	December 28, 2018
2	"The End of Saiki Kusuo (Part 2)"; Transliteration: "Saiki Kusuo no Saigo (Kōhen)" (Japanese: 斉木楠雄のΨ後（後編）)	December 28, 2018
When Kaido, Nendo, Aren, Chiyo, and Teruhashi plan for a trip in the holidays, Kusuo attempts to dissuade them from going to Oshimai, as it is where the Supervolcano is located. Saiki and the others go around Oshimai, with Hairo and Saiko joining them on the way, whilst Aiura and Reita attempt to help Saiki. The three try and fail to stop the eruption. The following day, Reita impersonates Saiki whilst Aiura and Saiki attempt to use Saiki's clones to stop the mountains eruption. After the group run into Saiki, Aiura, and the clones, they beg Saiki tell to them the truth, which he eventually does, speaking for the first time. However, he then jumps back in time and erases the moment, and uses the device to remove his powers. Now a former psychic, he goes around his regular routine, only to psychically smash a window upon seeing a bug.

=== Reawakened ===
Titled The Disastrous Life of Saiki K. Starting Arc or The Disastrous Life of Saiki K. Reawakened, this 6-episode series premiered on December 30, 2019, on Netflix worldwide.

No.	Title	Original release date
1	"Three Men, a Little Girl, a Police Officer and a Dog"; Transliteration: "San'nin no otoko to youjo to keikan to ato inu" (Japanese: 三人の男と幼女と警官とあと犬)	December 30, 2019
1	"Sign In to the Game World"; Transliteration: "Gēmu no sekai e sain'in" (Japanese: ゲームの世界へΨンイン)	December 30, 2019
1	"Publishing Crisis? Working at Shuensha"; Transliteration: "Keisai kiki!? Shuuensha no Oshigoto" (Japanese: 掲Ψ危機！？ 終焉社のお仕事)	December 30, 2019
1	"Proud Mom of a Son! Mom's Meetup"; Transliteration: "Saishi Jiman! Mamatomo Kaigi" (Japanese: Ψ子自慢！ ママ友会議)	December 30, 2019
1	"Let's Show Our Proud Clay Work"; Transliteration: "Jiman no Nendozaiku wo Hirou shiyou" (Japanese: 自慢の粘土Ψ工を披露しよう)	December 30, 2019
Kusuo and his "friends" search for a missing dog; Kusuo discovers the complexities of online gaming, then the world of adults as his father's stand-in. Kaido, Nendo, and Kusuo's mothers all meet up together at Kusuo's favorite restaurant. Each of the class members have to answer questions about their art pieces.
2	"Disasters Caused by Super Useless Abilities"; Transliteration: "Chō (Muda) Nouryoku no Sainan" (Japanese: 超（無駄）能力のΨ難)	December 30, 2019
2	"Build the Most Powerful Deck!"; Transliteration: "Saikyou Dekki o Kumiagero!" (Japanese: Ψ強デッキを組み上げろ！)	December 30, 2019
2	"The Die Is Cast! Fierce Card Battle"; Transliteration: "Sai wa nagerareta...! Gekitou Kādobatoru" (Japanese: Ψは投げられた…！激闘カードバトル)	December 30, 2019
2	"Metori Saiko's Equation of Victory"; Transliteration: "Saiko Metori no shōri no hōteishiki" (Japanese: Ψ虎芽斗吏の勝利の方程式)	December 30, 2019
2	"Hero in Disaster"; Transliteration: "Yuusha no Sainan" (Japanese: 勇者のΨ難)	December 30, 2019
When Kusuo's limiter is broken, he gains a bunch of random useless abilities which mess up his life at home while he tries to fix it. When Shun challenges Kusuo and Riki to a trading card game, Kusuo gets Riki some lucky super rares in a building a starter deck. During the duel, Kusuo sees some of the cards come to life. Later, the guys play basketball when rich boy classmate Saiko takes over his team. As the Saiki K. manga celebrates their five year anniversary, they meet Ken Haganeno, a famous manga character who tries to teach their class.
3	"New Teacher with an Outstanding Feature"; Transliteration: "Isai wo Hanatsu Shinninkyoushi Arawaru" (Japanese: 異Ψを放つ新任教師現る)	December 30, 2019
3	"The Disaster of the School Physical"; Transliteration: "Shintaisokutei no Sainan" (Japanese: 身体測定のΨ難)	December 30, 2019
3	"Visiting a Friend's House While Their Parents Are Out"; Transliteration: "Ryōshin Fuzai no Tomodachi no Ie ni Asobi ni Ikou" (Japanese: 両親不Ψの友達の家に遊びに行こう)	December 30, 2019
3	"Let's Aim for a Debut in Jump Magazine!"; Transliteration: "Mezase! Janpu Keisai" (Japanese: 目指せ!ジャンプ掲Ψ)	December 30, 2019
3	"Please Visit There and Enjoy"; Transliteration: "Minasama no Zehi Ichido Ashi wo Hakonde kudasai" (Japanese: 皆様も是非一度足を運んでみてくだΨ)	December 30, 2019
A new substitute teacher Mr. Iguchi joins Kusuo's class but he has a goofy look like a pervert. The class has physical exams. Kusuo remarks that everyone's the same height as last year because he had to rewind time to keep the world from a natural disaster. Iguchi is suspected of peeping at the girls. The guys visit Aren's house. The guys are working on homework when they look over Shun's story ideas and want to develop a manga. Kusuo's favorite desserts TV show episode is ruined when Kokomi's brother Toru Mugami guest stars.
4	"Terrifying! A Disastrous Transfer Student Appears! (Part 1)"; Transliteration: "Kyoufu! Saiyaku no Tenkousei Arawaru! (Zenpen)" (Japanese: 恐怖！Ψ厄の転校生現る！（前編）)	December 30, 2019
4	"Terrifying! A Disastrous Transfer Student Appears! (Part 2)"; Transliteration: "Kyoufu! Saiyaku no Tenkousei Arawaru! (Chuuhen)" (Japanese: 恐怖！Ψ厄の転校生現る！（中編）)	December 30, 2019
4	"Terrifying! A Disastrous Transfer Student Appears! (Part 3)"; Transliteration: "Kyoufu! Saiyaku no Tenkousei Arawaru! (Kouhen)" (Japanese: 恐怖！Ψ厄の転校生現る！（後編）)	December 30, 2019
4	"Read the Signs! Mikoto Aiura's Fortune Telling"; Transliteration: "Sain o yome! Aiura Mikoto no Yochi" (Japanese: Ψンを読め！ 相卜命の予知)	December 30, 2019
4	"A Disastrous and Optimal Battle!"; Transliteration: "Saiyaku to Saiteki no tatakai!!" (Japanese: Ψ厄とΨ適の戦い!!)	December 30, 2019
New transfer student Suzumiya Hii arrives in Reita's class, who has incredibly bad luck. Saiki agrees to watch her and Reita, to stop the bad luck. Saiki, Aiura, Suzumiya, and Reita all get clear death marks on their faces, and have to try and handle dangerous chemicals. The Psykickers desperately try and help Suzumiya through all her near-death experiences. Mikoto Aiura helps a string of customers at her fortune-telling job. Aiura and Saiki discover Satou and Suzumiya sit next to each other, causing his ordinary nature to nullify her unluckiness. However, although he likes her, she has a crush on Reita.
5	"Bully Rescue! Mr. Iguchi"; Transliteration: "Ijime Kyuusai! Iguchi-sensei" (Japanese: イジメ救Ψ!井口先生)	December 30, 2019
5	"Suddenly Begins! Real Real Escape Room"; Transliteration: "Totsuzen Kaisai! Riaru Riaru-gata Dasshutsu" (Japanese: 突如開Ψ!リアルリアル型脱出ゲーム)	December 30, 2019
5	"Spending the Weekend with Best Friends"; Transliteration: "Kyuujitsu wa Uma to Au nakama to" (Japanese: 休日はウマと合う仲間と)	December 30, 2019
5	"Toritsuka VS. Satou! Love Contest! (1st Volume)"; Transliteration: "Toritsuka VS Satō Kousaiken Soudatsusen (Zenpen)" (Japanese: 鳥束VS佐藤交Ψ権争奪戦!!（前編）)	December 30, 2019
5	"Toritsuka VS. Satou! Fighting Over Rights to Date! (2nd Volume)"; Transliteration: "Toritsuka VS Satō Kousaiken Soudatsusen (Kouhen)" (Japanese: 鳥束VS佐藤交Ψ権争奪戦!!（後編）)	December 30, 2019
Aren and Kaido are mistaken as bullies targeting Nendo. Kusuo escapes his friends before their plan to have an escape-room adventure becomes a reality. Akechi Touma invites himself to Saiki's house to spend time with him, despite Saiki's reservations. Satou continues to pine after Suzumiya, annoying Reita. Reita learns that Suzumiya's bad luck stems from her uncaring guardian spirit, so he, Saiki, and Touma decide to help her.
6	"Reawakening Saiki Kusuo Part 1"; Transliteration: "Saiki Kusuo no Saikidou (1)" (Japanese: 斉木楠雄のΨ起動 (1))	December 30, 2019
6	"Reawakening Saiki Kusuo Part 2"; Transliteration: "Saiki Kusuo no Saikidou (2)" (Japanese: 斉木楠雄のΨ起動 (2))	December 30, 2019
6	"Reawakening Saiki Kusuo Part 3"; Transliteration: "Saiki Kusuo no Saikidou (3)" (Japanese: 斉木楠雄のΨ起動 (3))	December 30, 2019
6	"Reawakening Saiki Kusuo Part 4"; Transliteration: "Saiki Kusuo no Saikidou (4)" (Japanese: 斉木楠雄のΨ起動 (4))	December 30, 2019
6	"Reawakening Saiki Kusuo Part 5"; Transliteration: "Saiki Kusuo no Saikidou (5)" (Japanese: 斉木楠雄のΨ起動 (5))	December 30, 2019
Set after Special 2, the former psychic Saiki Kusuo settles into his Third Year at PK Academy, struggling to adapt to a life without powers. He gets startled by people talking to him, is unable to do work with ease, cannot predict dangers, and begins to regret removing his powers. Kusuke realizes his device did not work, because Kusuo's body had evolved beyond that of an ordinary human. The next day, Kusuo's powers slowly begin returning. Kusuo learns of a meteor that will soon hit Japan, but is reluctant to stop it, until he sees all of his friends situations. Kusuo flies up to the meteor, and admits he enjoys psychic powers and troublesome things, before announcing 'My name is Saiki Kusuo. I'm a psychic.'
