= The Disastrous Life of Saiki K. (film) =

Japanese name
- Kanji: 斉木楠雄のΨ難
Transcriptions
- Revised Hepburn: Saiki Kusuo no Sai-nan
- Directed by: Yuichi Fukuda
- Written by: Yuichi Fukuda
- Based on: The Disastrous Life of Saiki K. by Shūichi Asō
- Produced by: Shinzô Matsuhashi; Naoaki Kitajima
- Starring: Kento Yamazaki; Hirofumi Arai; Ryo Yoshizawa; Hideyuki Kasahara; Kanna Hashimoto; Kento Kaku
- Production companies: Plus D Inc. Columbia Pictures
- Distributed by: Sony Pictures Entertainment Japan; Asmik Ace
- Release date: October 21, 2017
- Running time: 100 minutes
- Country: Japan
- Language: Japanese
- Box office: US$8.6 million

The Disastrous Life of Saiki K. (Japanese: 斉木楠雄のΨ難, Hepburn: Saiki Kusuo no Sai-nan), also known in English as Psychic Kusuo, is a 2017 Japanese science fiction comedy film and an adaptation of the manga series by Shūichi Asō, directed by Yuichi Fukuda. Starring Kento Yamazaki, Ryo Yoshizawa and Kanna Hashimoto at Columbia Pictures (Sony Pictures Entertainment Japan) and Asmik Ace, the film was released on October 21, 2017. A visual for this film was unveiled on Friday, May 20, 2017, revealing Kusuo's parents.

== Plot ==
Kusuo Saiki (Kento Yamazaki) is a 16-year-old high school student. He was born with many powers, including telepathy and telekinesis. This may sound cool, but, according to Kusuo's experience, super powers are not as good as we imagine. He tries to live a normal life, despite having a power that upsets him. Kusuo Saiki now tries to keep a distance from others to hide his psychic abilities, but his classmates with distinct individuality gather under Kusuo.

== Cast ==
- Kento Yamazaki as Kusuo Saiki
- Hirofumi Arai as Riki Nendō
- Ryo Yoshizawa as Shun Kaidō
- Hideyuki Kasahara as Kineshi Hairo
- Kanna Hashimoto as Kokomi Teruhashi
- Kento Kaku as Aren Kuboyasu
- Tsuyoshi Muro as Uryoku Chōno
- Jiro Sato as Pinsuke Kanda
- Seiichi Tanabe as Kuniharu Saiki
- Yuki Uchida as Kurumi Saiki

== Reception ==
This film grossed US$8.6 million at the Japanese box office.

Rachel Cheung of South China Morning Post found the film to be overacted: "It may be funny for the first time, and maybe the second, that the sweet 19-year-old actress Hashimoto imitates the exaggerated facial expressions of her anime character; but when it happens for the 10th time, it becomes quite boring, if not irritating."

== See also ==
- The Disastrous Life of Saiki K.
