= Coffee jelly =

Jelly dessert flavored with coffee and sugar

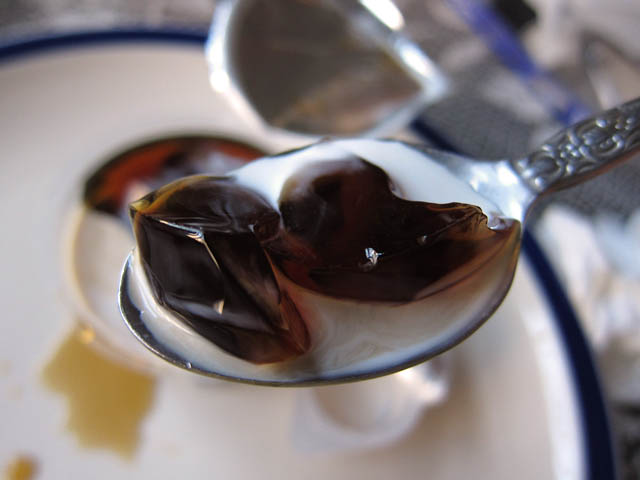
- Type: Jelly dessert
- Place of origin: Japan, England
- Main ingredients: Instant or fresh coffee, sugar and gelatin or agar jelly

Coffee jelly (コーヒーゼリー, kōhī zerī) is a jelly dessert flavored with coffee and sugar. Although once common in British and American cookbooks, it is now most common in Japan, where it can be found in most restaurants, cafés, and convenience stores. Coffee jelly can be made using an instant mix or from scratch. Coffee jelly is also frequently used in bubble tea/coffees.

== History ==
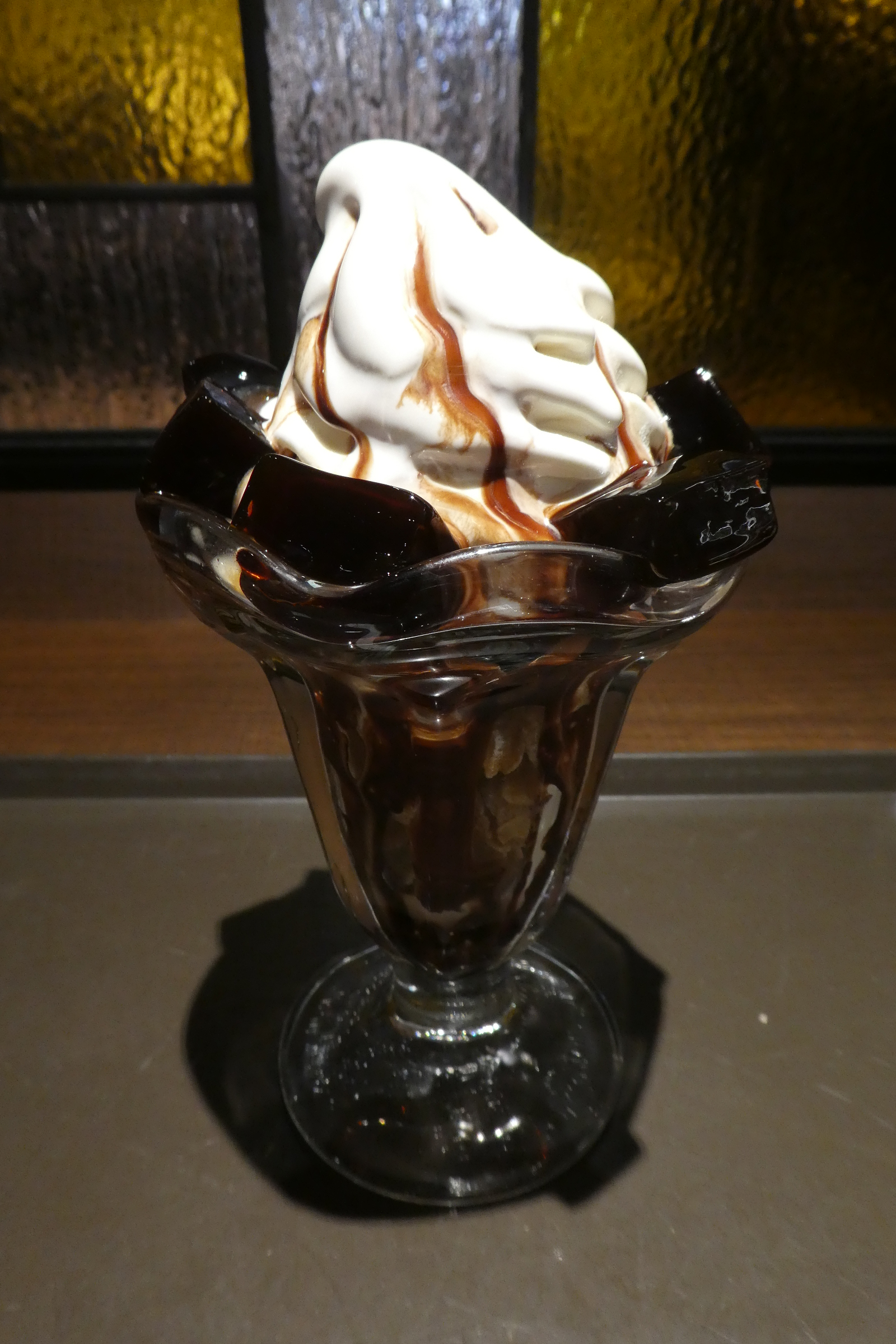
Japanese coffee jelly with ice cream

Recipes for coffee jelly appear in cookbooks published in England as early as 1817. The earliest recipes call for coffee to be mixed with calves' foot jelly and sometimes call for isinglass or other clarifiers. After the introduction of packaged gelatin, most recipes called for the gelatin to be dissolved in the hot coffee and then molded.

In the early 20th century, coffee jelly was promoted as a healthier alternative to hot coffee, as it was thought the gelatin would absorb excess acid in the stomach.

Jell-O launched a short-lived coffee gelatin mix in 1918, but the dessert never gained widespread popularity outside of New England. Nowadays, coffee jelly may still be found in Rhode Island, Massachusetts and other New England states. Durgin-Park restaurant in Boston, which opened in 1874, still offered coffee gelatin made with leftover coffee from the previous day as of 2016.

Japanese coffee jelly was developed during the Taishō period (1912–1926) in imitation of European molded jellies. It appealed to modern young men with tastes for Western fashion and rose in popularity along with café culture. Coffee jelly has remained popular in Japan and is still widely available. Starbucks launched a coffee jelly frappuccino in Japan in 2016.

== Description ==
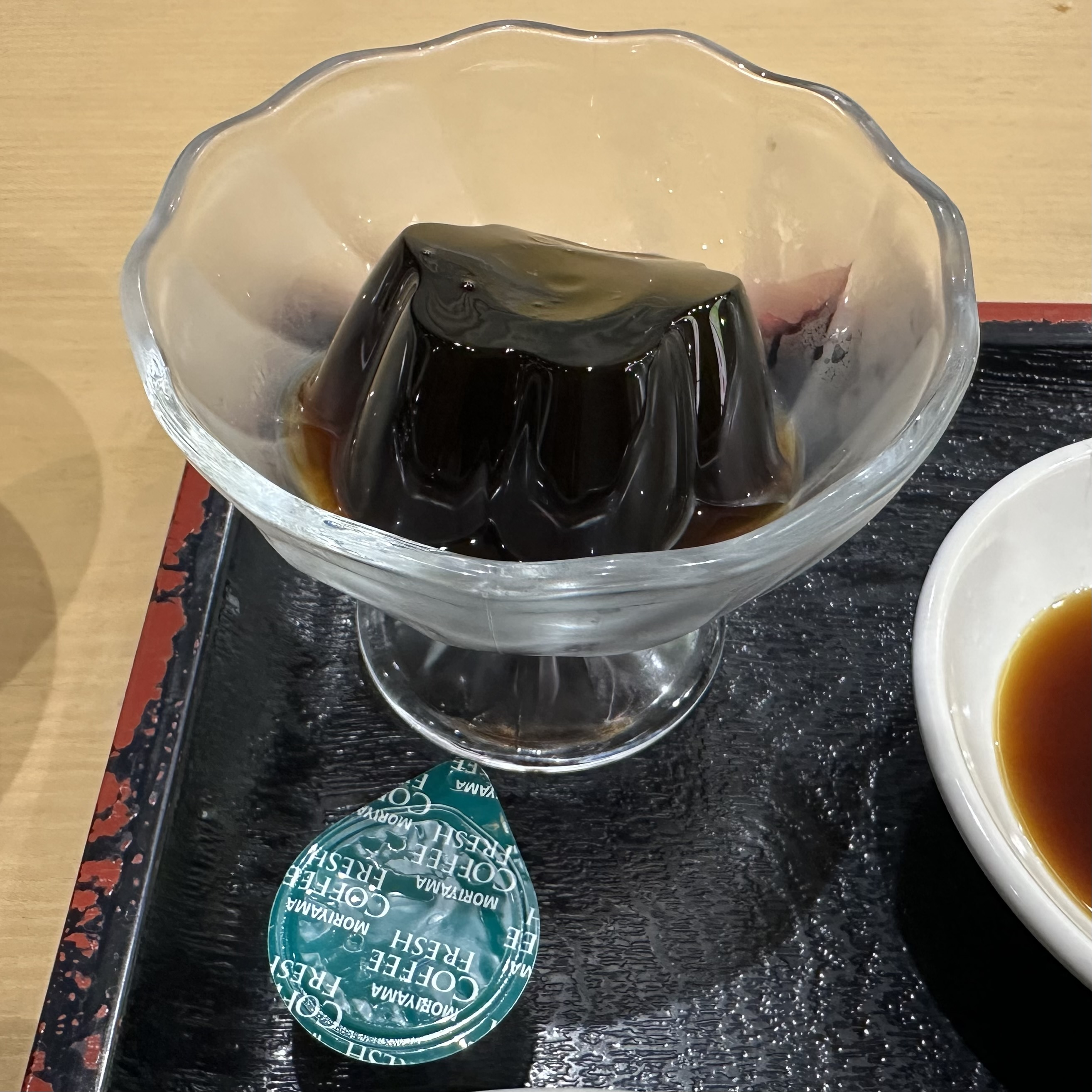
Japanese coffee jelly

Coffee jelly is made from sweetened coffee added to agar, a gelatinous substance made from algae and called kanten in Japanese. It may also be made from gelatin rather than agar, which is more common in European and American cuisine.

It is often cut into cubes and served in a variety of dessert dishes and beverages. Cubes of coffee jelly are sometimes added to milkshakes, at the bottom of an ice cream float, or to garnish an ice cream sundae. Coffee jelly is often added to a cup of hot or iced coffee, with cream and gum syrup added. Condensed milk is poured over cubes of chilled coffee jelly in a bowl.

== Popular culture ==
Coffee jelly appears numerous times throughout the manga The Disastrous Life of Saiki K. and its anime adaptation as the titular Kusuo Saiki's favorite food.

== See also ==
- List of coffee dishes

== General sources ==
- White, Merry I. (2012). Coffee Life in Japan. California studies in food and culture, 36. Berkeley, California: University of California Press. pp. 122–123 (subscription required). ISBN 978-0-520-25933-1. OCLC 747331872.
