= Kusuo Saiki =

Fictional Japanese manga character

- The Disastrous Life of Saiki K. character
- Kusuo Saiki as drawn by Shūichi Asō
- First appearance: Special One-Shot: The DiPSIster of Psychic Saiki Kusuo
- Created by: Shūichi Asō
- Voiced by: Hiroshi Kamiya (TV anime) (Japanese); Jerry Jewell (Season 1) (English); Kyle McCarley (Reawakened) (English)

In-universe information
- Full name: Kusuo Saiki
- Aliases: Kusuko Saiki/Kuriko Saiki (as a female); Sai (as a cat)
- Gender: Varies; usually male

Kusuo Saiki (Japanese: 斉木 楠雄, Hepburn: Saiki Kusuo) is the main character and the protagonist in the Japanese manga series The Disastrous Life of Saiki K. created by Shūichi Asō. In the manga, he is a Japanese high school student who possesses psychic abilities.^{OS Ch. 00}

The first appearance of Kusuo Saiki was in the one-shot manga Special One-Shot: The DiPSIster of Psychic Saiki Kusuo, published August 16, 2010.

== Description ==
=== Physical appearance ===
Kusuo Saiki typically has pink hair, of which he was born with, wears green glasses, and has two antenna-like "limiters" in his head. Saiki wears his glasses to stop his power of turning people into stone^{Ch. 71} and wears his limiters to limit his psychic powers.^{Ch. 10} He also wears invisible gloves due to having psychometry as a psychic power.

=== Personality ===
Saiki, despite his extraordinary powers, is reserved, wishes to be left alone, and typically very introverted, and level-headed. He shows little-to-no emotion due to his psychic powers. His favorite food is sweets, especially coffee jelly ;^{Ch. 68}^{Ch. 131}^{Ch. 61} Saiki also has an extreme fear of bugs, such as cockroaches. Despite Saiki's wish to be left alone, he has many friends, including Riki Nendo, Kaido Shun, Kokomi Teruhashi, and Aiura Mikoto. Saiki's catchphrase, "yare yare" (やれ やれ), translates to "good grief" or "what a pain."

=== Psychic powers ===
Despite both of his parents being normal people, Saiki has immense psychic powers and numerous special abilities. He has altered aspects of reality multiple times, such as making it normal for people to have odd colored hair (from the reader's stand point) or changing accepted rules, retroactively, at his school so that students are allowed to have part time jobs.

==== Clairvoyance ====
The power to view objects or people anywhere. Saiki must cross his eyes in order to use it.^{OS Ch. 06}

==== Hypnosis ====
The power to change people thoughts on certain things or a person. For example, in the episode where Saiki and his class go to the beach, he uses hypnosis to disguise Reita Toritsuka to appear as himself so Kokomi Teruhashi would see Toritsuka as Saiki.

==== Invisibility ====
The power to turn himself invisible for ten minutes. If touched, he becomes visible again. Reita Toritsuka can still see him while he's invisible. ^{Ch. 102}

==== Telekinesis/Psychokinesis ====
The power to bring about energy just by thinking.^{OS Ch. 02}

==== Telepathy ====
The power to know what other people are thinking. Saiki can also use telepathy to talk to people without speaking aloud. He can not read the minds of tiny lifeforms or people of low intelligence.

==== Teleportation ====
The power to transport himself to other places, One disadvantage is that if he has already teleported he has to wait 3 minutes to teleport again.

Psychometry

Psychometry is the ability to read the history, memories, and energy attached to an object or person just by touching it barehanded. For Saiki, touching an item instantly downloads all of its past events and information. He must wear gloves to prevent this ability from triggering accidentally.

== Appearances ==
Kusuo Saiki most notably appears in the manga The Disastrous Life of Saiki K. and its anime adaptation, but also appears in other media, such as the Netflix exclusive anime The Disastrous Life of Saiki K.: Reawakened, the live-action adaptation of the manga Psychic Kusuo, crossover fighting game J-Stars Victory VS, and a cameo in Assassination Classroom.

== Notes ==
"Ch." is shortened form for chapter and refers to a chapter number of The Disastrous Life of Saiki K. manga. "OS Ch." refers to a chapter in the one-shot version of The Disastrous Life of Saiki K.
