= The Disastrous Life of Saiki K. =

Japanese manga series and its adaptations

- First tankōbon volume cover, featuring Kusuo Saiki

斉木楠雄のΨ難 (Saiki Kusuo no Sai-nan)
- Genre: Comedy; Supernatural
- Manga
- Written by: Shūichi Asō
- Published by: Shueisha
- Imprint: Jump Comics
- Magazine: Weekly Shōnen Jump (May 14, 2012 – February 26, 2018); Jump Giga (May 25 – July 26, 2018)
- Original run: May 14, 2012 – July 26, 2018
- Volumes: 26
- Original net animation
- Music by: Yuuichi Murata
- Released: August 4, 2013
- Anime television series
- Directed by: Hiroaki Sakurai
- Produced by: List: Sayako Matsumura; Takashi Umemoto; Tomoya Negishi; Jun Fukuda; Ryouichi Ishihara; Shinobu Satou; Hitoshi Yagi; Hideyuki Yamazaki; Naoki Matsushita
- Written by: Michiko Yokote
- Music by: Psychic Lover
- Studio: J.C.Staff
- Licensed by: AUS: Madman Entertainment; NA: Funimation (expired)
- Original network: TV Tokyo, TV Aichi, TV Osaka, TV Hokkaido
- Original run: July 4, 2016 – December 28, 2018
- Episodes: 120 (Note: The first season was originally aired as 120 episodes, but recompiled into a 24-episode format afterwards.)
- Video game

Saiki Kusuo no Psi Nan: Shijō Psi Dai no Psi Nan!?
- Developer: Bandai Namco Studios
- Publisher: Bandai Namco Entertainment
- Platform: Nintendo 3DS
- Released: November 10, 2016
Further information
Anime television series
2nd Season
| Directed by | Hiroaki Sakurai |
| Produced by | List: Sayako Matsumura; Takashi Umemoto; Kaori Itou; Yasushi Uchida; Mai Ogiwara; Kentarou Anai; Souya Kiyota; Takahiro Fujii; Souji Miyagi; Tatsuo Shibano |
| Written by | Michiko Yokote |
| Music by | Psychic Lover |
| Studio | J.C.Staff |
| Licensed by | Netflix |
| Original network | TV Tokyo, TV Aichi, TV Osaka, TV Hokkaido |
| Original run | January 17, 2018 – June 27, 2018 |
| Episodes | 24 |
Anime television series
The Disastrous Life of Saiki K.: Conclusion
| Directed by | Hiroaki Sakurai |
| Produced by | List: Sayako Matsumura; Takashi Umemoto; Kaori Itou; Kentarou Anai; Souya Kiyota; Takahiro Fujii; Souji Miyagi; Tatsuo Shibano |
| Written by | Michiko Yokote |
| Music by | Psychic Lover |
| Studio | J.C.Staff |
| Licensed by | Netflix |
| Original network | TV Tokyo, TV Aichi, TV Osaka, TV Hokkaido |
| Original run | December 28, 2018 |
| Episodes | 1 (Note: The third season aired as two episodes combined into one 45 minute television special.) |
Original net animation
The Disastrous Life of Saiki K.: Reawakened
| Directed by | Hiroaki Sakurai |
| Produced by | List: Sayako Matsumura; Takashi Umemoto; Mai Ogiwara; Kaori Itou; Kentarou Anai; Souya Kiyota; Takahiro Fujii; Souji Miyagi; Tatsuo Shibano; Shiotto Nakayama; Takashi Fujita |
| Written by | Michiko Yokote |
| Music by | Psychic Lover |
| Studio | J.C.Staff |
| Licensed by | Netflix |
| Released | December 30, 2019 |
| Episodes | 6 |
Live-action film
The Disastrous Life of Saiki K. (2017)
- icon

The Disastrous Life of Saiki K. (Japanese: 斉木楠雄のΨ難, Hepburn: Saiki Kusuo no Sai-nan) is a Japanese manga series written and illustrated by Shūichi Asō. Following a series of one-shot chapters published from 2010 to 2011, the manga was serialized in Shueisha's shōnen manga magazine Weekly Shōnen Jump from May 2012 to February 2018. It was followed by a short serialization of 4-panel chapters published in the same magazine, and two one-shot chapters published in Jump Giga in May and July 2018. Shueisha collected its chapters in twenty-six tankōbon volumes.

An anime television series adaptation produced by J.C.Staff, aired from July 2016 to December 2018. A live-action film directed by Yuichi Fukuda and starring Kento Yamazaki at Columbia Pictures (Sony Pictures Entertainment Japan) and Asmik Ace was released in October 2017. A six-episode sequel anime series entitled The Disastrous Life of Saiki K.: Reawakened premiered on Netflix in December 2019.

== Premise ==
Kusuo Saiki is a high school student with an extraordinary secret—he possesses a wide array of psychic abilities, such as psychokinesis and teleportation. Despite his powers, he goes to great lengths to conceal them from everyone at school, desiring to live a normal, average life. Throughout the series, Kusuo usually finds himself in comedic daily life scenarios where he discreetly employs his powers to navigate the challenges he faces. Along the way, he encounters lots of new people, each presenting what they need or want from Kusuo. Most of the time, he is able to cleverly use his abilities to resolve issues without drawing attention to himself.

Kusuo eventually receives a "limiter" from his older brother that removes his powers. Despite this, he regains his abilities and learns that he is basically a different species of human now, as his body has adapted to his overwhelming powers. This revelation adds a new layer of complexity to his already unique life.

== Media ==
=== Manga ===
The Disastrous Life of Saiki K. is written and illustrated by Shūichi Asō. He started publishing one-shot chapters of the series. The first chapter was published in the Summer 2010 issue of Jump Next! on August 16, 2010. Chapters were then irregularly published in Weekly Shōnen Jump from May 9 to November 21, 2011, and in the Winter 2012 issue of Jump Next! on December 26, 2011. A compiled tankōbon volume was published on May 2, 2012. The series was then serialized in Weekly Shōnen Jump from May 14, 2012, to February 26, 2018. It was later followed by a short serialization of 4-panel chapters published in the same magazine. Asō published one-shot chapters in Shueisha's Jump Giga on May 25 and July 26, 2018. Shueisha has compiled its 281 individual chapters into twenty-six individual tankōbon volumes, published from September 4, 2012, to August 3, 2018.

=== Light novel ===
On May 4, 2013, a light novel titled Saiki Kusuo no Psi-nan - Extra Story of Psychics was released, following with Saiki Kusuo no Psi-nan - Extra Story of Psychics 2 in July 2014.

=== Anime ===
A flash anime series based on the manga began release on Jump Live from August 4, 2013, featuring the same voice cast as an earlier Comic adaptation.

An anime television adaptation was announced by Weekly Shōnen Jump in 2016. J.C.Staff and Egg Firm produced the adaptation, with Hiroaki Sakurai directing, Michiko Yokote handling series composition and Masayuki Onji designing the characters. The series began airing on July 4, 2016, on TV Tokyo, with an episode airing every weekday morning followed by a compilation episode at the end of each week, the series would contain one hundred and twenty episodes in total, along with twenty four compilation episodes on Oha Suta. The opening themes are "Seishun wa Zankoku janai" (青春は残酷じゃない, Youth Isn't So Cruel) by Natsuki Hanae, "Sai-Sai-Saikōchō!" (最Ψ最好調！, The Most Favorable!) by Denpagumi.inc from the thirteenth compiled episode onwards and "Saihakkenden!" (Ψ発見伝！) by Denpagumi.inc from second season, while the ending theme, also used for the short episodes, is "Psi desu - I Like You" (Ψです I LIKE YOU) by Denpagumi.inc. From the thirteenth compiled episode onwards, the ending theme is "Kokoro" (こころ, Heart) by Hanae. From second season, the ending theme is "Saihakkenden!" (Ψ発見伝！) by Denpagumi.inc. The series was simulcast by Funimation, who released an English dub on August 7, 2016.

A 24-episode second season aired from January to June 2018. In the last episode of the second season, an anime conclusion special was announced. It premiered on December 28, 2018.

On March 24, 2019, it was announced that a new anime series would be released on Netflix, with the Japanese cast and staff returning to reprise their roles. Titled The Disastrous Life of Saiki K.: Starting Arc or The Disastrous Life of Saiki K.: Reawakened, the 6-episode new series premiered on December 30, 2019, on Netflix worldwide.

=== Video games ===
A video game titled Saiki Kusuo no Sai-nan: Shijō Psi Dai no Psi Nan!?, developed by Bandai Namco Studios and published by Bandai Namco Entertainment for Nintendo 3DS, was released on November 10, 2016.

Another video game adaptation, Saiki Kusuo no Sai-nan: Mousou! Saikikku Battle (斉木楠雄のΨ難 妄想暴走！Ψキックバトル), is a tower defense game for mobile phones announced at Jump Festa 2018. It was released on April 16, 2018, in Japan.

Kusuo also appears as a playable character in the Jump crossover fighting game J-Stars Victory VS released in 2014. Its European and North American release marks the first release of Saiki Kusuo no Psi-nan material outside Japan.
