= Spitz discography =

The discography of Japanese rock band Spitz consists of 17 studio albums, 3 extended plays, 6 compilations, 44 physical singles, and 1 digital single. All chart positions are provided by the Japanese chart company Original Confidence, and music certifications are given by the Recording Industry Association of Japan.

Throughout their career, Spitz has sold in excess of 20.8 million copies albums and singles by the end of 2013, based on cumulative sales counted by the Oricon charts. Universal Music Group announced that the band had sold over 32 million units records as of August 2009.

== Albums ==
=== Studio albums ===
| Year | Title | Album details | Peak chart positions | Certifications (thresholds) |
| Year | Title | Album details | JPN | Certifications (thresholds) |
|---|---|---|---|---|
| 1991 | Spitz (スピッツ) | Released: March 25, 1991; Label: Polydor Japan (POCH-1080) | — | |
| 1991 | Namae o Tsukete Yaru (名前をつけてやる) | Released: November 25, 1991; Label: Polydor Japan (POCH-1103) | — | |
| 1992 | Hoshi no Kakera (惑星のかけら) | Released: September 26, 1992; Label: Polydor Japan (POCH-1148) | — | |
| 1993 | Crispy! | Released: September 26, 1993; Label: Polydor Japan (POCH-1270) | 27 | RIAJ: Gold |
| 1994 | Sora no Tobikata (空の飛び方) | Released: September 21, 1994; Label: Polydor Japan (POCH-1392) | 4 | RIAJ: 2× Platinum |
| 1995 | Hachimitsu (ハチミツ) | Released: September 20, 1995; Label: Polydor Japan (POCH-1527) | 1 | RIAJ: 4× Platinum |
| 1996 | Indigo Chiheisen (インディゴ地平線) | Released: October 23, 1996; Label: Polydor Japan (POCH-1605) | 1 | RIAJ: 3× Platinum |
| 1998 | Fake Fur (フェイクファー) | Released: March 25, 1998; Label: Polydor Japan (POCH-1685) | 1 | RIAJ: 2× Platinum |
| 2000 | Hayabusa (ハヤブサ) | Released: July 26, 2000; Label: Polydor Japan (POCH-4001) | 3 | RIAJ: Platinum |
| 2002 | Mikazuki Rock (三日月ロック) | Released: September 11, 2002; Label: Universal J (UPCH-1172) | 1 | RIAJ: Platinum |
| 2005 | Souvenir (スーベニア) | Released: January 12, 2005; Label: Universal J (UPCH-1380) | 1 | RIAJ: Platinum |
| 2007 | SazanamiCD (さざなみCD) | Released: October 10, 2007; Label: Universal J (UPCH-1620) | 1 | RIAJ: Platinum |
| 2010 | Togemaru (とげまる) | Released: October 27, 2010; Label: Universal J (UPCH-1803) | 2 | RIAJ: Gold |
| 2013 | Chiisana Ikimono (小さな生き物) | Released: September 11, 2013; Label: Universal J (UPCH-1946) | 1 | RIAJ: Gold |
| 2016 | Samenai (醒めない) | Released: July 27, 2016; Label: Universal J (UPCH-2086) | 1 | RIAJ: Gold |
| 2019 | Mikke (見っけ) | Released: October 9, 2019; Label: Universal J (UPCH-2194) | 2 | RIAJ: Gold |
| 2023 | Himitsu Studio (ひみつスタジオ) | Released: May 17, 2023; Label: Polydor (UPCH-2256) | 2 | |

=== Compilation albums ===
| Year | Title | Album details | Peak chart positions | Certifications (thresholds) |
| Year | Title | Album details | JPN | Certifications (thresholds) |
|---|---|---|---|---|
| 1999 | Ka Chō Fū Getsu (花鳥風月) | Released: March 25, 1999; Label: Polydor Japan (POCH-1776) | 3 | RIAJ: Platinum |
| 1999 | Recycle: Greatest Hits of Spitz | Released: December 15, 1999; Label: Polydor Japan (POCH-1900) | 1 | RIAJ: 2× Million |
| 2004 | Iro Iro Goromo (色色衣) | Released: March 21, 2004; Label: Universal J (UPCH-1335) | 1 | RIAJ: Platinum |
| 2006 | Cycle Hit 1991–1997: Spitz Complete Single Collection | Released: March 25, 2006; Label: Universal Music Japan (UPCH-9231) | 1 | RIAJ: 3× Platinum |
| 2006 | Cycle Hit 1997–2005: Spitz Complete Single Collection | Released: March 25, 2006; Label: Universal Music Japan (UPCH-9232) | 3 | RIAJ: 2× Platinum |
| 2012 | Orutana (おるたな) | Released: February 1, 2012; Label: Universal J (UPCH-1863) | 3 | RIAJ: Gold |
| 2021 | Ka Chō Fū Getsu Plus (花鳥風月+) | Released: September 15, 2021; Label: Universal J (UPCH-2224) | 2 | |

== Extended plays ==
| Year | Title | EP details | Peak chart positions | Certifications (thresholds) |
| Year | Title | EP details | JPN | Certifications (thresholds) |
|---|---|---|---|---|
| 1990 | Hibari no Kokoro (ヒバリのこころ) (Independent release) | Released: March 21, 1990; Label: Mistral (PMC-002) | — | |
| 1992 | Aurora ni Narenakatta Hito no Tame ni (オーロラになれなかった人のために) | Released: April 25, 1992; Label: Polydor Japan (POCH-1133) | — | |
| 1999 | 99ep | Released: January 1, 1999; Label: Polydor Japan (POCH-1750) | 8 | RIAJ: Gold |

== Singles ==
Physical releases

| Year | Title | Certifications (thresholds) | Album |
|---|---|---|---|
| 1991 | "Hibari no Kokoro" (ヒバリのこころ：Lark's Heart) | —N/a | Spitz (スピッツ) |
| 1991 | "Natsu no Mamono" (夏の魔物：Summer Demon) | —N/a | Spitz (スピッツ) |
| 1991 | "Majo Tabi ni Deru" (魔女旅に出る：The Witch Goes On a Journey) | —N/a | Namae o Tsukete Yaru (名前をつけてやる：I'll Give You a Name) |
| 1992 | "Hoshi no Kakera" (惑星のかけら：Piece of the Planet) | —N/a | Hoshi no Kakera (惑星のかけら：Piece of the Planet) |
| 1992 | "Hinata no Mado ni Akogarete" (日なたの窓に憧れて：Longing For a Window on the Sunny Side) | —N/a | Hoshi no Kakera (惑星のかけら：Piece of the Planet) |
| 1993 | "Hadaka no Mama de" (裸のままで：Stay Naked) | —N/a | Crispy! |
| 1993 | "Kimi ga Omoide ni Naru Mae ni" (君が思い出になる前に：Before You Become a Memory.) | —N/a | Crispy! |
| 1994 | "Sora mo Toberuhazu" (空も飛べるはず：Should Be Able to Fly) | —N/a | Sora no Tobikata (空の飛び方：How to Fly in the Sky) |
| 1994 | "Aoi Kuruma" (青い車：Blue Car) | —N/a | Sora no Tobikata (空の飛び方：How to Fly in the Sky) |
| 1994 | "Spider" (スパイダー) | —N/a | Sora no Tobikata (空の飛び方：How to Fly in the Sky) |
| 1995 | "Robinson" (ロビンソン) | —N/a | Hachimitsu (ハチミツ：Honey) |
| 1995 | "Namida ga Kirari" (涙がキラリ☆：Tears Glistening☆) | —N/a | Hachimitsu (ハチミツ：Honey) |
| 1996 | "Cherry" (チェリー) | —N/a | Indigo Chiheisen (インディゴ地平線：Indigo Horizon) |
| 1996 | "Nagisa" (渚：Beach) | —N/a | Indigo Chiheisen (インディゴ地平線：Indigo Horizon) |
| 1997 | "Scarlet" (スカーレット) | —N/a | Fake Fur (フェイクファー) |
| 1997 | "Yume Janai" (夢じゃない：It's Not a Dream) | —N/a | Crispy! |
| 1997 | "Unmei no Hito" (運命の人：Man of Destiny) | —N/a | Fake Fur (フェイクファー) |
| 1998 | "Tsumetai Hoho/Xie Xie!" (冷たい頬 / 謝々！：Cold Cheek/Xie Xie!) | —N/a | Fake Fur (フェイクファー) |
| 1998 | "Kaede/Spica" (楓 / スピカ：Maple/Spica) | —N/a | Fake Fur (フェイクファー) ※1 Kacho Fugetsu (花鳥風月：Beauty of Nature) ※2 |
| 1999 | "Nagareboshi" (流れ星：Shooting Star) | —N/a | Kacho Fugetsu (花鳥風月：Beauty of Nature) |
| 2000 | "Hotaru" (ホタル：Firefly) | —N/a | Hayabusa(ハヤブサ：Falcon) |
| 2000 | "Memories/Hōrō Kamome wa Doko made mo" (メモリーズ / 放浪カモメはどこまでも：Memories/The Wandering Seagull Goes Everywhere) | —N/a | Hayabusa(ハヤブサ：Falcon) |
| 2001 | "Haruka" (遥か：Far Off) | —N/a | Mikazuki Rock(三日月ロック：Crescent Rock) |
| 2001 | "Yume Oi Mushi" (夢追い虫：Dream Chasing Insect) | —N/a | Iro Iro Goromo (色色衣：Various Clothes) |
| 2001 | "Sawatte, Kawatte" (さわって・変わって：Touch, Change) | —N/a | Mikazuki Rock (三日月ロック：Crescent Rock) |
| 2002 | "Hanemono" (ハネモノ：Creatures Like Wings) | —N/a | Mikazuki Rock (三日月ロック：Crescent Rock) |
| 2002 | "Mizuiro no Machi" (水色の街：Light Blue City) | —N/a | Mikazuki Rock (三日月ロック：Crescent Rock) |
| 2004 | "Stargazer" (スターゲイザー) | —N/a | Iro Iro Goromo (色色衣：Various Clothes) |
| 2004 | "Masayume" (正夢：The Dream Came True) | —N/a | Souvenir (スーベニア) |
| 2005 | "Haru no Uta/Teku Teku" (春の歌 / テクテク：Song of Spring/Walk Ploddingly) | —N/a | Souvenir (スーベニア) ※1 Alternative (おるたな) ※2 |
| 2006 | "Mahō no Kotoba" (魔法のコトバ：Magical Words) | —N/a | Sazanami CD (さざなみCD：Ripple CD) |
| 2007 | "Looking For" (ルキンフォー) | —N/a | Sazanami CD (さざなみCD：Ripple CD) |
| 2007 | "Gunjō" (群青：Ultramarine) | —N/a | Sazanami CD (さざなみCD：Ripple CD) |
| 2008 | "Wakaba" (若葉：Young Leaves) | —N/a | Togemaru (とげまる) |
| 2009 | "Kimi wa Taiyō" (君は太陽：You are the Sun) | —N/a | Togemaru (とげまる) |
| 2010 | "Tsugumi" (つぐみ：Thrush) | —N/a | Togemaru (とげまる) |
| 2010 | "Shirokuma/Beginner" (シロクマ / ビギナー：Polar Bear:Beginner) | —N/a | Togemaru (とげまる) |
| 2013 | "Sarasara/Boku wa kitto tabi ni deru" (さらさら / 僕はきっと旅に出る：Murmuring/I'm Sure I'll Travel) | —N/a | Chiisana Ikimono (小さな生き物：Little Creatures) |
| 2014 | "Ai no kotoba ~2014 mix~ (愛のことば -2014 mix-：Words of Love -2014 mix-) | —N/a | CYCLE HIT 2006-2017 Spitz Complete Single Collection |
| 2015 | "Yukikaze" (雪風:：Snow-Bearing Wind) | —N/a | Samenai (醒めない：Not Wake Up) |
| 2016 | "Minato" (みなと：Harbor) | —N/a | Samenai (醒めない：Not Wake Up) |
| 2019 | "Yasashii Ano Ko" (優しいあの子：That Kind Girl) | RIAJ: Platinum (streaming) | Mikke (見っけ：Found It) |
| 2020 | "Neko Chigura" (猫ちぐら：Cat Roost) | —N/a | |
| 2021 | "Murasaki no Yoru wo Koete" (紫の夜を越えて：Beyond the Purple Night) | —N/a | |
| 2021 | "Daikōbutsu" (大好物：Favorite food) | —N/a | |

Digital releases

| Title | Year | Detail |
|---|---|---|
| "Time Travel" | 2012 | Label: Universal J |

== Videography ==
=== Video clips ===
| Title | Year | Format | Catalognumber |
|---|---|---|---|
| Sora to Video (ソラトビデオ) | April 26, 1995 | VHS | POVH-1046 |
| Sora to Video 2(ソラトビデオ2) | July 7, 1997 | VHS | POVH-1057 |
| Sora to Video 3 (ソラトビデオ3) | September 6, 2000 | VHS | UPVH-1001 |
| Sora to Video 3 (ソラトビデオ3) | September 6, 2000 | DVD | UPBH-1009 |
| Sora to Video 3 (ソラトビデオ3) | February 19, 2003 | DVD | UPBH-9085 |
| Sora to Video Custom Video Clip Chronicle 1991-2001 (ソラトビデオ・カスタム VIDEO CLIP CHRONICLE 1991-2001) | June 6, 2001 | DVD | UPBH-1025 |
| Sora to Video Custom Video Clip Chronicle 1991-2001 (ソラトビデオ・カスタム VIDEO CLIP CHRONICLE 1991-2001) | February 19, 2003 | DVD | UPBH-9086 |
| Sora to Video 4 (ソラトビデオ4) | August 3, 2005 | DVD | UPBH-1170 |
| Sora to Video Complete 1991-2011 (ソラトビデオCOMPLETE 1991-2011) | April 6, 2011 | 3DVD | UPBH-9468 |
| Sora to Video Complete 1991-2011 (ソラトビデオCOMPLETE 1991-2011) | April 6, 2011 | 2DVD | UPBH-1278/9 |

=== Live video ===
| Title | Year | Format | Catalog number |
|---|---|---|---|
| JAMBOREE 1 | October 10, 1996 | VHS | POVH-1052 |
| JAMBOREE 1 | October 10, 1996 | LD | POLH-1052 |
| JAMBOREE 2 | April 7, 1999 | VHS | POVH-1076 |
| Jamboree Deluxe LIVE CHRONICLE 1991-2000 (ジャンボリー・デラックス LIVE CHRONICLE 1991-2000) | June 6, 2001 | DVD | UPBH-1026 |
| Jamboree Deluxe LIVE CHRONICLE 1991-2000 (ジャンボリー・デラックス LIVE CHRONICLE 1991-2000) | February 19, 2003 | DVD | UPBH-9087 |
| Horo Hayabusa Junjo Sugoroku Live 2000-2003 (放浪隼純情双六 Live 2000-2003) | December 17, 2003 | DVD | UPBH-9135/6 |
| Horo Hayabusa Junjo Sugoroku Live 2000-2003 (放浪隼純情双六 Live 2000-2003) | December 18, 2013 | DVD | UPBH-1356 |
| Spitz Jamboree Tour 2009 ~Sazanami OTR Custom at Saitama Super Arena~ (JAMBOREE TOUR 2009 〜さざなみOTRカスタム at さいたまスーパーアリーナ〜) | November 4, 2009 | 2DVD+2CD | UPBH-9442 |
| Spitz Jamboree Tour 2009 ~Sazanami OTR Custom at Saitama Super Arena~ (JAMBOREE TOUR 2009 〜さざなみOTRカスタム at さいたまスーパーアリーナ〜) | November 4, 2009 | DVD | UPBH-1239 |
| Togemaru 20102011 (とげまる20102011) | December 21, 2011 | 2BD+2CD | UPXH-9001 |
| Togemaru 20102011 (とげまる20102011) | December 21, 2011 | 2DVD+2CD | UPBH-9484 |
| Togemaru 20102011 (とげまる20102011) | December 21, 2011 | BD | UPXH-1003 |
| Togemaru 20102011 (とげまる20102011) | December 21, 2011 | DVD | UPBH-1299 |
| Jamboree 3 ''Chiisana Ikimono" (JAMBOREE 3 "小さな生き物") | July 1, 2015 | BD | UPXH-1020 |
| Jamboree 3 ''Chiisana Ikimono" (JAMBOREE 3 "小さな生き物") | July 1, 2015 | DVD | UPBH-1387 |
| The Great Jamboree 2014 "Festivarena" Nippon Budokan (THE GREAT JAMBOREE 2014 “FESTIVARENA”日本武道館) | January 1, 2016 | 1BD+2CD | UPXH-9011 |
| The Great Jamboree 2014 "Festivarena" Nippon Budokan (THE GREAT JAMBOREE 2014 “FESTIVARENA”日本武道館) | January 1, 2016 | 2DVD+2CD | UPBH-9530 |
| The Great Jamboree 2014 "Festivarena" Nippon Budokan (THE GREAT JAMBOREE 2014 “FESTIVARENA”日本武道館) | January 1, 2016 | 1BD | UPXH-1025 |
| The Great Jamboree 2014 "Festivarena" Nippon Budokan (THE GREAT JAMBOREE 2014 “FESTIVARENA”日本武道館) | January 1, 2016 | 2DVD | UPBH-1393/4 |
| Spitz Jamboree Tour 2016 "Sa Me Na I" (SPITZ JAMBOREE TOUR 2016 “醒 め な い”) | May 3, 2017 | 1BD+2CD | UPXH-9020 |
| Spitz Jamboree Tour 2016 "Sa Me Na I" (SPITZ JAMBOREE TOUR 2016 “醒 め な い”) | May 3, 2017 | 1DVD+2CD | UPBH-9540 |
| Spitz Jamboree Tour 2016 "Sa Me Na I" (SPITZ JAMBOREE TOUR 2016 “醒 め な い”) | May 3, 2017 | 1BD | UPXH-1049 |
| Spitz Jamboree Tour 2016 "Sa Me Na I" (SPITZ JAMBOREE TOUR 2016 “醒 め な い”) | May 3, 2017 | 1DVD | UPBH-1431 |
| SPITZ 30th ANNIVERSARY TOUR "THIRTY30FIFTY50" | December 27, 2017 | 1BD+2CD | UPXH-9024 |
| SPITZ 30th ANNIVERSARY TOUR "THIRTY30FIFTY50" | December 27, 2017 | 2DVD+2CD | UPBH-9548 |
| SPITZ 30th ANNIVERSARY TOUR "THIRTY30FIFTY50" | December 27, 2017 | 1BD | UPXH-1058 |
| SPITZ 30th ANNIVERSARY TOUR "THIRTY30FIFTY50" | December 27, 2017 | 1DVD | UPBH-1448 |
| Spitz Concert 2020 "Nekochigura no Yube" (スピッツ コンサート 2020 "猫ちぐらの夕べ) | October 19, 2022 | 1BD+2CD | UPXH-9032 |
| Spitz Concert 2020 "Nekochigura no Yube" (スピッツ コンサート 2020 "猫ちぐらの夕べ) | October 19, 2022 | 1DVD+2CD | UPBH-9571 |
| Spitz Concert 2020 "Nekochigura no Yube" (スピッツ コンサート 2020 "猫ちぐらの夕べ) | October 19, 2022 | 1BD | UPXH-1080 |
| Spitz Concert 2020 "Nekochigura no Yube" (スピッツ コンサート 2020 "猫ちぐらの夕べ) | October 19, 2022 | 1DVD | UPBH-1505 |
| SPITZ JAMBOREE TOUR 2021 "NEW MIKKE" | October 19, 2022 | 1BD+2CD | UPXH-9033 |
| SPITZ JAMBOREE TOUR 2021 "NEW MIKKE" | October 19, 2022 | 1DVD+2CD | UPBH-9572 |
| SPITZ JAMBOREE TOUR 2021 "NEW MIKKE" | October 19, 2022 | 1BD | UPXH-1081 |
| SPITZ JAMBOREE TOUR 2021 "NEW MIKKE" | October 19, 2022 | 1DVD | UPBH-1506 |
