= One Week Friends =

Japanese manga series

- Cover of Isshūkan Friends volume 1 by Square Enix

一週間フレンズ。 (Isshūkan Furenzu.)
- Genre: Romance
- Manga
- Written by: Matcha Hazuki
- Published by: Square Enix
- English publisher: NA: Yen Press
- Magazine: Gangan Joker
- Original run: January 21, 2012 – January 22, 2015
- Volumes: 7
- Anime television series
- Directed by: Tarou Iwasaki
- Written by: Shōtarō Suga
- Music by: Nobuko Toda
- Studio: Brain's Base
- Licensed by: AUS: Madman Entertainment; NA: Sentai Filmworks
- Original network: Tokyo MX, MBS, TVA, BS11, AT-X
- Original run: April 6, 2014 – June 22, 2014
- Episodes: 12 + 12 specials
- Manga

Sonogo no Isshūkan Friends
- Written by: Matcha Hazuki
- Published by: Square Enix
- Magazine: Gangan Joker
- Original run: April 22, 2021 – present
- Live-action film
- One Week Friends (film)

One Week Friends (Japanese: 一週間フレンズ。, Hepburn: Isshūkan Furenzu.) is a manga series by Matcha Hazuki. It was serialized in Square Enix's Gangan Joker magazine between January 21, 2012, and January 22, 2015. It was first published as a one-shot manga in the magazine's September 2011 issue. The series has since been collected in seven tankōbon volumes. An anime television series adaptation by Brain's Base aired between April 6 and June 22, 2014. Sentai Filmworks licensed the rights to the show in North America and by Madman Entertainment in Australia and New Zealand. A live-action film of the same name was released in February 2017.

== Plot ==
High schooler Yūki Hase notices that his beautiful classmate Kaori Fujimiya is always alone and seemingly has no friends. After approaching her and becoming better acquainted, Kaori reveals that every Monday she loses all memory of her friends. Despite learning this, Yūki endeavors to befriend her anew every week.

== Characters ==
Yūki Hase (長谷 祐樹, Hase Yūki)
Voiced by: Yoshitaka Yamaya Played by: Kento Yamazaki
Yūki is a second year high school student who develops an interest in an isolated classmate, Kaori Fujimiya. Despite Kaori forgetting about him every week, he never ceases working hard to earn her smile. He's weak in mathematics.
Kaori Fujimiya (藤宮 香織, Fujimiya Kaori)
Voiced by: Sora Amamiya Played by: Haruna Kawaguchi
Kaori is Yūki's classmate who chooses to not make friends as she loses her memories concerning friends at the beginning of every week. She used to be popular in school, but was in a car accident that gave her a severe case of anterograde amnesia. She decides to keep a diary after Yūki suggests that she record her experiences. This helps her to become more and more familiar with Yūki, to the point of just barely remembering him. She is also able to remember thing linked to him with but where the memory have no reference to him in such as remembering making eggs for him but not the act of giving them.
She also seems to develop feelings for him regardless of conscious memory. When asked if she likes him in a later chapter she blushes noticeably. She had made a promise to meet up with her childhood friend, Hajime Kujō, but was unable to do so because of the accident. Her mother suggests that to an extent, she may be repressing her own memories. She is quite good in mathematics as compared to Yūki, and often helps him with his studies.
Shōgo Kiryū (桐生 将吾, Kiryū Shōgo)
Voiced by: Yoshimasa Hosoya Played by: Takashi Matsuo
Shōgo is Yūki's reliable best friend with good grades. He appears to be a cold person who's straightforward with words, and often sleeps in class while treating everything else as a bother.
Saki Yamagishi (山岸 沙希, Yamagishi Saki)
Voiced by: Rumi Ōkubo Played by: Haori Takahashi
Saki is a clumsy and forgetful girl in their class who used to be Shōgo's primary school classmate. She used to be bullied due to her small stature in primary school, and has since depended on others for all matters.
Hajime Kujō (九条 一, Kujō Hajime)
Voiced by: Shintarō Asanuma Played by: Shuhei Uesugi
Hajime is a student who transfers in during the second semester and who was Kaori's primary school classmate. He and Kaori promised to meet in the park the day before he transferred to Hokkaido, but Kaori did not show up due to her accident. His family has strict demands on him, to the point where he isn't allowed to buy games.
Maiko Serizawa (芹澤 舞子, Serizawa Maiko)
Voiced by: Asuka Kakumoto
Maiko is Saki's friend who often spoils her.
Ai Nishimura (西村 藍, Nishimura Ai)
Voiced by: Rui Tanabe
Ai is Saki's friend who is a good coordinator.
Shiho Fujimiya (藤宮 志穂, Fujimiya Shiho)
Voiced by: Mai Nakahara Played by: Sayuri Kokusho
Shiho is Kaori's mother.
Jun Inoue (井上 潤, Inoue Jun)
Voiced by: Junji Majima Played by: Shigeyuki Totsugi
Jun is Yūki's homeroom and math teacher.

== Media ==
=== Manga ===
One Week Friends began as a one-shot manga by Matcha Hazuki and was first published in Gangan Joker's September 2011 issue. A full serialization later followed in Square Enix's Gangan Joker from January 21, 2012. After spanning three years, the series came to an end in the February 2015 issue of Gangan Joker which was published in Japan on January 22, 2015. Despite the end of the serialization, a special chapter will later be included in the magazine's May 2015 issue when it is published on April 22, 2015. The chapters was collected into a total of seven tankōbon volumes, the first of which was released on June 22, 2012. The final volume was released on April 22, 2015. During their Sakura-Con 2017 panel, Yen Press announced their license to the manga.

On March 22, 2021, the April 2021 issue of Gangan Joker revealed that a sequel manga titled Sonogo no Isshūkan Friends would begin serialization in the next issue.

=== Anime ===
An anime television series adaptation by Brain's Base began airing on April 6, 2014. The TV anime is produced by Brain's Base and directed by Taro Iwasaki. The opening theme is "Niji no Kakera" (虹のかけら; lit. 'Fragments of a Rainbow'), sung by Natsumi Kon, with lyrics and composition by Ai Kawashima. The ending theme is a cover of Sukima Switch's 2004 single "Kanade" (奏（かなで）; lit. 'Symphony') sung by Sora Amamiya, the voice actress of female protagonist, Kaori Fujimiya. The anime has been licensed by Sentai Filmworks in North America.

=== Stage play ===
A stage play adaptation ran from November 14 to 24, 2014 in Japan. The play stars Tomoki Okayama as Yūki Hase, Maya Okano as Kaori Fujimiya, Kimito Totani as Shōgo Kiryū, and Juria Kawakami as Saki Yamagishi.

=== Live-action film ===
A live-action film was released in February 2017. The film is directed by Shōsuke Murakami and written by Yōko Izumisawa.

== Reception ==
Carl Kimlinger of Anime News Network (ANN) gave One Week Friends an overall B+ rating. He wrote that the premise can push its dramatic moments a little too far and almost nothing happens throughout the first half of the series. Regardless, Kimlinger praised the plot's character development, saying that it saves the first half with its progression through little events; he added that the dramatic scenes are nicely underplayed to help viewers care for the characters. Kimlinger wrote that Brain's Base and director Tarou Iwasaki provide the series with a style that's perfect, calling the minimalist backgrounds evocative with the right mood and the character animations superb, saying "that makes the show what it is: a sleeper delight, plain and simple." Fellow ANN editor Gabriella Ekens praised the show for being "emotionally intelligent" with its showcase of Yūki's character growth and for being "beautifully realized" with its "faux-water color style" illustrating Kaori's progression and recovery from amnesia, concluding that: "One Week Friends is slice of life at its best. Gentle, atmospheric, and emotionally resonant, it's the perfect comfort food for an afternoon in. It might be quiet, but you won't forget about it any time soon." Conversely, Allen Moody from THEM Anime Reviews criticized the "blandness and predictability" of the premise and its characters, singling out Saki for being "annoying on several levels", but commended the show's overall "inoffensiveness" and felt that both Shōgo and Kaori's mom Shiho were the only "genuinely good" people throughout the series.

The manga has had over 1 million copies printed in Japan.
