= Chitose Hajime =

Japanese singer (born 1979)

Chitose Hajime 元 ちとせ
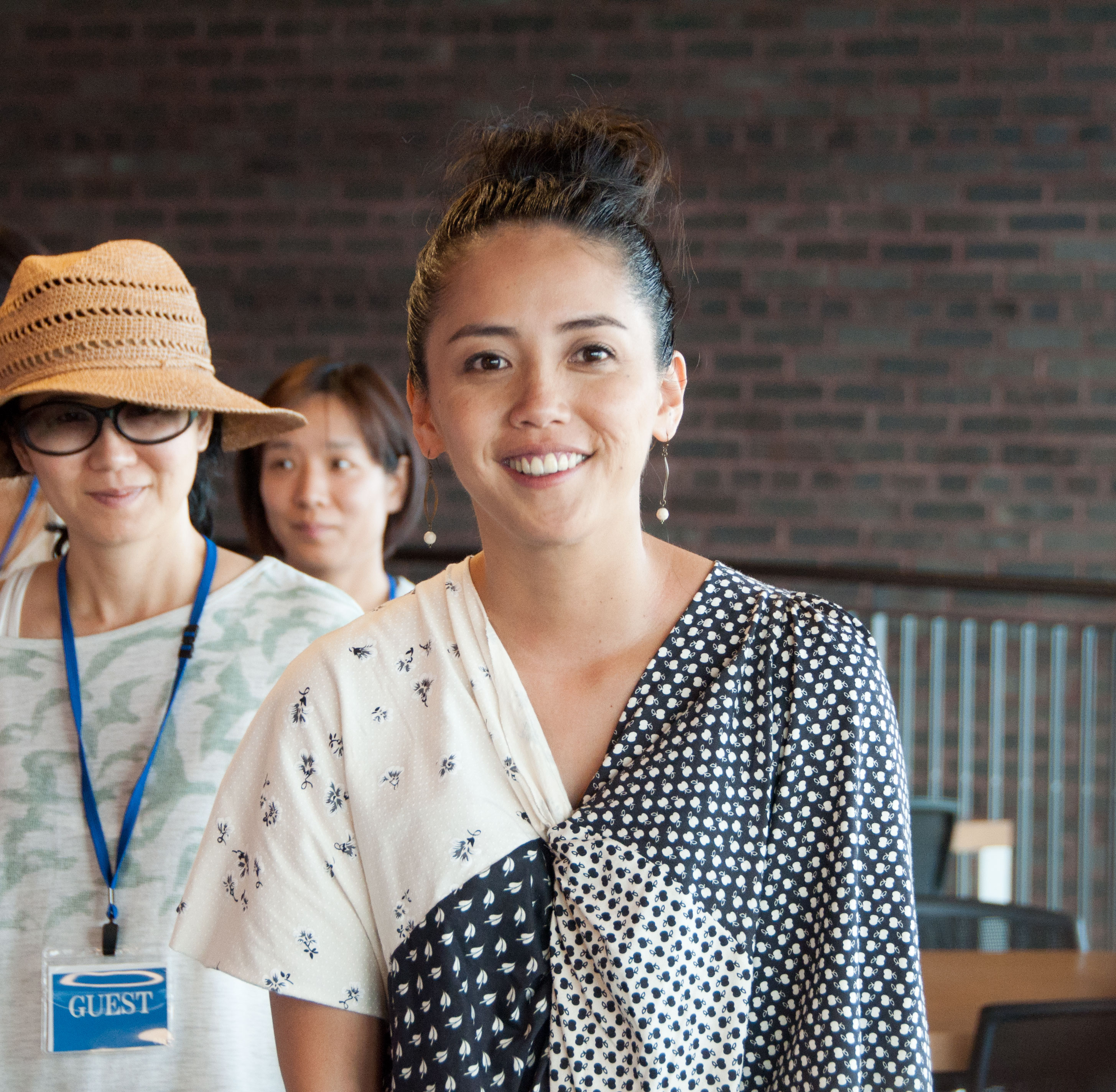

Background information
- Born: January 5, 1979 (age 47); Setouchi, Kagoshima, Japan
- Genres: Folk, World music
- Occupation: Singer
- Years active: 1993–present
- Labels: Central Gakki Records (1994–1997), Atsuga (2001), Epic (2001–present)
- Website: www.hajimechitose.com

Chitose Hajime (元 ちとせ, Hajime Chitose; born January 5, 1979) is a Japanese singer from Amami Ōshima. She sings in the shima-uta style particular to that region, with distinctive falsetto effects.

== History ==
=== Early life ===
Chitose Hajime began learning shamisen under her mother's encouragement from a young age. At age 10 she began to pick up shima-uta, a style of singing passed down through generations.

She won many folk and other song competitions during her teens, traveling to events across Japan. She released two traditional folk albums on cassette on an indie label, the first at age 16, and at age 17 was approached by numerous record labels following a grand prize win at a local folk song contest. Stating in a later interview that she was "suspicious of them", she decided not to join the labels or pursue music, and instead chose to study to become a beautician, following in the footsteps of her older sister. She moved to Osaka in 1997. However, she suffered from asthma and had severe allergic reactions to many of the chemicals used by beauticians. She withdrew from school, but before returning home to Amami Ōshima she contacted the artist management company Office Augusta, the only company that had gone all the way to visit her on her home island during the flurry to sign her at age 17.

=== Music career ===
In March 2001, she released a self-titled mini-album through Augusta Records. The album of cover versions included four English-language songs performed originally by Carole King, The Sugarcubes, Jimi Hendrix and Velvet Underground, but was so well received that Hajime was pushed to release another mini-album less than five months later. In August 2001, Chitose released her second mini-album with Augusta Records entitled Kotonoha (コトノハ), this time featuring five original tracks.

In 2002, she released her first major label single on Epic Records – Wadatsumi no Ki (ワダツミの木) ("The Sea-God's Tree"). It was the third highest selling single of the year behind only Hikaru Utada's "traveling", and Ayumi Hamasaki's "H", selling an estimated 850,000 copies. Three months later, she released a brand new single, "Kimi o Omou" (君ヲ想フ). While also very popular, it was not nearly the success that her first single was, although it did help to cement her as a permanent artist.

Her first major album, Hainumikaze (ハイヌミカゼ), followed later in the year. It sold 800,000 copies, charted for 57 weeks, and was the 16th highest selling album of the year.

She released three more singles before her second major album, Nomad Soul (ノマド・ソウル, nomado souru), was released in 2003. Shortly after a concert tour, and the release of a live album and DVD in 2004, Hajime announced that she would be getting married, and was to have her first child in 2005.

She returned to the music industry in November 2005 with the single "Kataritsugu Koto" (語り継ぐこと), the ending theme for the anime series BLOOD+. The single was a hit, reaching No. 12 on the Oricon charts. She followed this success with "Haru no Katami" (春のかたみ), the ending theme for the anime AYAKASHI – Japanese Classic Horror. The single sold 6,050 copies in its first week, and remained on the charts for seven weeks total. A third single, "Ao no Requiem" (青のレクイエ), was the theme song for the Studio GAGA film Hatsukoi. The following week, Hajime released her third original major album, Hanadairo (ハナダイロ). A limited-edition version featured a 13th track, "Shinda Onna no Ko" (死んだ女の子) with Ryuichi Sakamoto), as well as a DVD containing the music videos for "Kataritsugu Koto", and "Haru no Katami".

Following Hanadairo (ハナダイロ), Hajime took an extended break to spend time with her family and moving to Okinawa. She returned in 2008 with the release of "CASSINI" (カッシーニ), based on the theme of family and bonding.

In August 2010 she released two albums simultaneously, the Japanese language "Orient" and the English language "Occident".

== Influence ==
Studies have revealed that her particular style of singing, including aspects of traditional Amami-Ōshima music, has a relaxing effect that has been observed in electroencephalograms taken from the brains of people listening to her singing.

== Discography ==
=== Indie albums ===
- [1994.08.12] Higya Merabe (ひぎゃ女童) - Cassette Tape, Central Gakki Records

Side A

1. Naga Asabana Bushi (長朝花節)
2. Shonjoshu Bushi (俊良主節)
3. Kurudando Bushi (くるだんど節)
4. Magaryo Takajichi Bushi (曲がりょ高頂節)
5. Rankan Boshi Bushi (らんかん橋節)
6. Amagurumi Bushi (雨黒み節)
7. Shumichi Nagahama Bushi (塩道長浜節)
8. Honen Bushi (豊年節)
9. Komori Uta (子守唄)

Side B

1. Yukyunnya Kana Bushi (行きゅんにゃ加那節)
2. Nagakumo Bushi (長雲節)
3. Shunkane Bushi (シュンカネ節)
4. Yoisura Bushi (ヨイスラ節)
5. Kunnyori Yoneago Bushi (国直よね姉節)
6. Kantsume Bushi (かんつめ節)
7. Shogachi Gin (正月着物)
8. Choukikujo (ちょうきく女節)
9. Mucha Kana Bushi (むちゃ加那節)
- [2002.06.09] Shima • Kyora • Umui (故郷・美ら・思い) - originally released in 1997, it was re-released in 2002 by Central Gakki Records
1. Asakasetsu (朝花節)
2. Nagatomohanasetsu (長朝花節)
3. Shonjoshusetsu (俊良主節)
4. Kurudandosetsu (くるだんど節)
5. Kantsumesetsu (かんつめ節)
6. Shonkanesetsu (シュンカネ節)
7. Rankanhashisetsu (らんかん橋節)
8. Amekurumisetsu (雨黒み節)
9. Shusetsunagahamasetsu (塩道長浜節)
10. Yoshinori Nabe Kanasetsu (嘉徳なべ加那節)
11. Kunnyoriyoneagosetsu (国直よね姉節)
12. Osakumosetsu (長雲節)
13. Mucha Kanasetsu (むちゃ加那節)
14. Chookikujosetsu (ちょうきく女節)
15. Itoayatsurisetsu (糸繰り節)
16. Yoisurasetsu (ヨイスラ節)
17. Ikyonnyakanasetsu (行きゅんにゃ加那節)
18. Ikyooresetsu (行きょうれ節)
19. Kubamehasetsu (くばぬ葉節)
20. Magaryo Takachidjisetsu (曲がりょ高頂節)
21. Shoogatsugin (正月着物)
22. Hoonensetsu (豊年節)

The songs in the two albums above are folk music songs of Amami Islands sung in Amami language.

- [2001.03.10] Hajime Chitose - mini album, Augusta Records
1. Birthday (by The Sugarcubes)
2. Namae no nai Tori (名前のない鳥)
3. Sweet Jane (by Lou Reed / Velvet Underground)
4. Little Wing (by Jimi Hendrix)
5. Fuyu no Sanitorium (冬のサナトリウム)
6. Home Again (by Carole King)
- [2001.08.01] Kotonoha (コトノハ) - mini album, Augusta Records
1. Kotonoha (コトノハ)
2. Yakusoku (約束)
3. Ryuuguu no Tsukai (竜宮の使い)
4. Seirei (精霊)
5. Sanhachigatsu (三八月)

=== Major albums ===
- [2002.07.10] Hainumikaze (ハイヌミカゼ)
1. Sango Jugoya (サンゴ十五夜)
2. Wadatsumi no Ki (ワダツミの木)
3. Natsu no Utage (夏の宴)
4. Hikaru Kaigara (ひかる・かいがら)
5. Shinshin Raika (心神雷火)
6. 37.6
7. Hatsukoi (初恋)
8. Hainumikaze (ハイヌミカゼ)
9. Kimi wo Omou (君ヲ想フ)
10. Rinto Suru (凛とする)
- [2003.09.03] Nomad Soul (ノマド・ソウル)
1. Triangle (トライアングル)
2. Neiro Nanairo (音色七色)
3. Sen no Yoru to Sen no Hiru (千の夜と千の昼)
4. Itsuka Kaze ni Naru Hi (いつか風になる日)
5. Hisui (翡翠)
6. Aurora Sora Kara Mitsumete Iru (オーロラの空から見つめている)
7. Kono Machi (この街)
8. Getsurei 17.4 (月齢17．4)
9. Yuri Collection (百合コレクション)
10. Uragano Oka (ウルガの丘)
- [2004.08.04] Fuyu no Hainumikaze (冬のハイヌミカゼ) - Double Disc Live Album

Disc 1

1. Kotonoha
2. Triangle
3. Byakuya
4. Aurora no Sora kara Mitsumete Iru
5. Getsurei 17.4
6. Hainumikaze
7. Kimi wo Omou
8. Yuri Collection
9. Yoru ni Yomeru Uta
10. Namae no Nai Tori
11. 37.6
12. Shooryoo
13. Kono Machi

Disc 2

1. Sango Jugoya
2. Shinshi Raika
3. Sanpono no Susume
4. Hummingbird
5. Neiro Nanairo
6. Wadatsumi no Ki
7. Sen no Yoru to Sen no Hiru
8. Itsuka Kaze ni Naru Hi
9. Mihachigatsu
10. Uruga no Oka
11. Hikaru Kaigara
- [2006.05.10] Hanadairo (ハナダイロ)
1. Hitsuji no Dolly (羊のドリー)
2. Maebure (前兆)
3. Ao no Requiem (青のレクイエム) – theme song of a film "Hatsukoi / (First Love)" of Aoi Miyazaki
  - Written and Composed by Sadayoshi Okamoto, – Arranged by COIL
4. Yomihitoshirazu (詠み人知らず)
5. Hanadairo (はなだいろ)
6. Haru no Katami (春のかたみ) – theme song of Ayakashi: Samurai Horror Tales
  - Written and Composed by Yumi Matsutoya, – Arranged by Masataka Matsutoya
7. Tsuyukusa no Yoru (蛍草の夜)
8. Kyouryuu no Egaki Gata (恐竜の描き方)
9. Reimei (黎明)
10. Amurita (甘露)
11. Kaze to Uta to Inori (風と歌と祈り)
12. Kataritsugu Koto (語り継ぐこと) – ending theme song of Blood+
  - Written by HUSSY R, – Composed, Arranged by Tashika Yuuichi, – Arranged by Shintarō Tokita
13. Shinda Onna no Ko (死んだ女の子) / (The Dead Little Girl)
  - Written by Turkish poet Nâzım Hikmet, – Translated by Nobuyuki Nakamoto, – Composed by Yuzo Sotoyama, – Produced and played piano by Ryuichi Sakamoto
- [2008.07.16] CASSINI (カッシーニ)
1. Cassini (カッシーニ)
2. Megumi no Ame (恵みの雨)
3. Anata ga Koko ni Ite Hoshii (あなたがここにいてほしい)
4. Kasei Kuru Kuru (カセイクルクル)
5. Hotaru Boshi (蛍星) – Produced, Written and Composed by Shintarō Tokita from Sukima Switch
6. Akakokko (あかこっこ)
7. Miyori no Mori (ミヨリの森)
8. Niji ga Umareru Kuni (虹が生まれる国) – Produced by Paddy Moloney from the Chieftains
9. Rokko Ballad (六花譚)
10. Tama Yura (玉響) (たまゆら)
11. Seiya Kyoku (静夜曲)
12. Sora ni Saku (空に咲く花) / (Flower in the Sky) – theme song of a drama "Boushi / (Caps/Hats)"
  - Written by Yoko Maruyama, – Supported by HUSSY R, – Composed by Yuichi Tajika, Yoshinobu Morikawa, Arranged by Takumi Mamiya

=== Singles ===
- [2002.02.06] Wadatsumi no Ki (ワダツミの木)
1. Wadatsumi no Ki (ワダツミの木)
2. Maboroshi no Tsuki (幻の月)
3. Yoru ni Yomeru Uta (夜に詠める うた)
- [2002.05.22] Kimi wo Omou (君ヲ想フ)
1. Kimi o Omou ( 君ヲ想フ)
2. Oyasumi (おやすみ)
3. BLUE
- [2002.11.07] Kono Machi (この街)
1. Kono Machi (この街)
2. Hummingbird (ハミングバード)
3. Rinto Suru -strings version- (凛とする－strings version－)
- [2003.06.11] Sen no Yoru to Sen no Hiru (千の夜と千の昼)
1. Sen no Yoru to Sen no Hiru (千の夜と千の昼)
2. Byakuya (白夜)
3. TRUE COLOURS
- [2003.08.13] Itsuka Kaze ni Naru Hi (いつか風になる日)
1. Itsuka Kaze ni Naru Hi (いつか風になる日)
2. Sanpono no Susume (散歩のススメ)
- [2005.11.23] Kataritsugu Koto (語り継ぐこと)
1. Kataritsugu Koto (語り継ぐこと)
2. Tsuki wo Nusumu (月を盗む)
3. Happiness is a Warm Gun
- [2006.03.08] Haru no Katami (春のかたみ)
1. Haru no Katami (春のかたみ)
2. Ai to Iu Na no Okurimono (愛という名の贈りもの)
3. Perfect
- [2006.05.03] Ao no Requiem (青のレクイエ)
1. Ao no Requiem (青のレクイエム)
2. Tooku e Ikitai (遠くへ行きたい)
- [2007.08.22] Anata ga Koko ni Ite Hoshii/Miyori no Mori (あなたがここにいてほしい/ミヨリの森)
1. Anata ga Koko ni Ite Hoshii (あなたがここにいてほしい)
2. Miyori no Mori (ミヨリの森)
3. Bojou Love is a Many Splendored Thing (慕情 Love is a many splendored thing)
4. Ushinawareta Mono-tachi e (失われたものたちへ)
- [2008.07.02/ Hotaru boshi (蛍星)
1. Hotaru boshi (蛍星)
2. Siuil A run
3. Yasashii uta (やさしいうた)

=== DVD ===
- [2004.08.04] Music Film Hajime Chitose Live – Fuyu no Hainumikaze (ミュージック・フィルム 元ちとせライヴ「冬のハイヌミカゼ」) - DVD Featuring Live Performances and a 'Music Film' of Chitose in Amami O-Shima

Music Film track list

1. Kotonoha (コトノハ)
2. Triangle (トライアングル)
3. Hainumikaze (ハイヌミカゼ)
4. Kimi o Omou (君ヲ想フ)
5. Yuri Collection (百合コレクション)
6. Hikaru Kaigara (ひかるかいがら)
7. Seirei (精霊)
8. Kono Machi (この街)
9. Shinshin Raika (心神雷火)
10. 37.6
11. Wadatsumi no Ki (ワダツミの木)
12. Sen no Yoru to Sen no Hiru (千の夜と千の昼)
13. Itsuka Kaze ni Naru Hi (いつか風になる日)

Bonus Live Material

1. Kotonoha (コトノハ)
2. Triangle (トライアングル)
3. Getsurei 17.4 (月齢 17.4)
4. Yoru ni Yomeru Uta (夜に詠める歌)
5. 37.6
6. Seirei (精霊)
7. Sango Jugoya (サンゴ十五夜)
8. Sanpo no Susume (散歩のススメ)
9. Hummingbird (ハミングバード)
10. Neiro Nanairo (音色七色)
11. Wadatsumi no Ki (ワダツミの木)
12. Itsuka Kaze ni Naru Hi (いつか風になる日)
13. Sanhachigatsu (三八月)
14. Uruga no Oka (ウルガの丘)

== See also ==
- Boushi (TV drama) (2008)
