= SazanamiCD =

Studio album by Spitz
- Released: October 10, 2007 (compact disc); December 26, 2007 (double LP)
- Recorded: March 2006 – June 2007
- Genre: Rock, pop
- Length: 52:37 (compact disc edition); 64:12 (vinyl edition)
- Label: Universal J
- Producer: Spitz, Seiji Kameda

Spitz chronology
Souvenir (2005)	SazanamiCD (2007)	Togemaru (2010)

Professional ratings
Review scores
Source	Rating
Allmusic	4/5 stars

SazanamiCD (さざなみCD) is a studio album by Japanese rock band Spitz, released in October 2007.

The album includes the smash hit "Mahou no Kotoba", released as a single in 2006. It was featured as the theme song for Honey and Clover, a film adaptation of a manga whose title was named after the Spitz's 1995 album and Shikao Suga's debut album.

A further two singles "Looking for" and "Gunjou" were released prior to the album. One of them, The Cure-esque "Gunjou" features Takuya Ohashi (lead vocalist of the duo Sukima Switch) and Kana Uemura on guest vocals, and comedy double act Ungirls appeared on its promotional film.

In terms of sales, Sazanami was their least successful album since their breakthrough in the 1990s; although it debuted at the pinnacle of the Japanese Oricon chart and has been certified platinum by the RIAJ.

After the album was issued, the band embarked on the concert tour entitled Sazanami OTR.

== Track listing ==
All songs written and composed by Masamune Kusano, arranged and produced by Spitz and Seiji Kameda (except strings arrangement for "Mahou no Kotoba" and "Sazanami" by Kameda)

=== Compact disc edition ===
1. "Boku no Guitar" (僕のギター) - 3:18
2. "Momo" (桃) - 3:56
3. "Gunjou" (群青) - 4:20
4. "Na.de.Na.de Boy" (Na.de.Na.deボーイ) - 4:01
5. "Looking for" (ルキンフォー, Rukinfō) - 4:32
6. "Fushigi" (不思議) - 4:49
7. "Ten to Ten" (点と点) - 3:09
8. "P" - 4:19
9. "Mahou no Kotoba" (魔法のコトバ) 4:03
10. "Tobiuo" (トビウオ) - 3:37
11. "Nezumi no Shinka" (ネズミの進化) - 3:47
12. "Sazanami" (漣) - 4:47
13. "Sabaku no Hana" (砂漠の花) - 3:36

=== LP edition with additional tracks ===
==== Side one ====
1. "Sabaku no Hana" (砂漠の花) - 3:36
2. "Fushigi" (不思議) - 4:49
3. "Ten to Ten" (点と点) - 3:09
4. "P" - 4:19

==== Side two ====
1. "Rakugaki Oukoku" (ラクガキ王国) - 3:12
2. "Mahou no Kotoba" (魔法のコトバ) 4:03
3. "Tobiuo" (トビウオ) - 3:37
4. "Sazanami" (漣) - 4:47

==== Side three ====
1. "Momo" (桃) - 3:56
2. "Yūyake" (夕焼け) - 5:17
3. "Gunjou" (群青) - 4:20
4. "Shalala" (シャララ) - 3:06

==== Side four ====
1. "Boku no Guitar" (僕のギター) - 3:18
2. "Nezumi no Shinka" (ネズミの進化) - 3:47
3. "Na.de.Na.de Boy" (Na.de.Na.deボーイ) - 4:01
4. "Looking for" (ルキンフォー, Rukinfō) - 4:32

== Chart positions ==
Chart	Position	Sales
Japanese Oricon Weekly Albums Chart (top 300)	1	215,000+

== Certification ==
Country	Organization	Certification	Shipments
Japan	RIAJ	Platinum	250,000+
