= List of One Week Friends chapters =

One Week Friends, a Japanese manga series written and illustrated Matcha Hazuki, began as a one-shot manga by Matcha Hazuki and was first published in Gangan Joker's September 2011 issue. A full serialization later followed in Square Enix's Gangan Joker from January 21, 2012. After spanning three years, the series came to an end in the February 2015 issue of Gangan Joker which was published in Japan on January 22, 2015. Despite the end of the serialization, a special chapter will later be included in the magazine's May 2015 issue when it is published on April 22, 2015. The chapters was collected into a total of seven tankōbon volumes, the first of which was released on June 22, 2012. The final volume was released on April 22, 2015. During their Sakura-Con 2017 panel, Yen Press announced their license to the manga.

On March 22, 2021, the April 2021 issue of Gangan Joker revealed that a sequel manga titled Sonogo no Isshūkan Friends would begin serialization in the next issue.

== Volumes ==
| No. | Original release date | Original ISBN | English release date | English ISBN |
|---|---|---|---|---|
| 1 | June 22, 2012 | 978-4-757-53633-3 | December 19, 2017 | 978-0-316-41416-6 |
1. The Start of a Friendship (友達のハジマリ。, Tomodachi no Hajimari); 2. Please Be My Friend (友達になってください。, Tomodachi ni Natte Kudasai); 3. A Day Out with a Friend (友達との休日。, Tomodachi to no Kyūjitsu); 4. Friend of a Friend (友達の友達。, Tomodachi no Tomodachi)
| 2 | November 22, 2012 | 978-4-757-53796-5 | April 10, 2018 | 978-0-316-44736-2 |
4. Fight with a Friend (友達とのけんか。, Tomodachi to no Kenka); 5. Friend Who? (友達の誰か。, Tomodachi no Dare ka); 6. Home of a Friend (友達の家。, Tomodachi no Ie); A Certain Week of One-Week Friends (とある一週間の「一週間フレンズ。」, Toaru Isshūkan no "Isshūkan Furenzu"); 7. Mother of a Friend (友達の母親。, Tomodachi no Hahaoya); 8. A New Friend (新しい友達。, Atarashii Tomodachi)
| 3 | April 27, 2013 | 978-4-757-53953-2 | June 26, 2018 | 978-0-316-44739-3 |
9. A Friend I Remember (覚えてる友達。, Oboeteru Tomodachi); 10. A Friend I Like (好きな友達。, Suki na Tomodachi); 11. A Friend I Can't Meet (会えない友達。, Aenai Tomodachi); 12. Friends and the Beach (友達と海。, Tomodachi to Umi); 13. A Final Day with Friends (友達との最後日。, Tomodachi to no Saigobi); 14. Less Than Friends (トモダチ未満。, Tomodachi Miman)
| 4 | November 22, 2013 | 978-4-757-54137-5 | September 18, 2018 | 978-0-316-44743-0 |
15. 18 (eighteen) (18（ジューハチ）。, 18 (Jūhachi)); 16. Nostalgia and Butterflies (懐かしさと。胸騒ぎと。, Natsukashisa to. Munasawagi to.); 17. Childhood Refrain (あの頃、リフレイン。, Ano Goro, Rifurein); 18. Trird-Wheel Rhaspsody (邪魔者ラプソディ。, Jamamono Rapusodi); 19. Formula for Enjoyment (スキになるための化学式。, Suki ni Naru Tame no Kagakushiki); 20. Because I Had Fun... (楽しかった、から･･･。, Tanoshikatta, Kara...); 21. Ring Rolling Stone (環状ローリングストーンズ。, Kanjō Rōringu Sutōnzu); One Week of One Week Friends (いつかの一週間の「一週間フレンズ。」, Itsuka no Isshūkan no "Isshūkan Furenzu")
| 5 | March 22, 2014 | 978-4-757-54256-3 | December 11, 2018 | 978-0-316-44746-1 |
22. If He's a Jerk... (悪イヤツナラ。, Warui Yatsu Nara); 23. Complex Tune (コンプレックス チューン。, Konpurekkusu Chūn); 24. Fushimi Inari Mosaic (伏見稲荷モザイク。, Fushimi Inari Mozaiku); 25. What Are We Going to Be Anyway? (僕らは結局どうなっていく。, Bokura wa Kekkyoku Dō Natteiku); 26. ar^{n - 1} Infinitely Close to Zero (限りなく0に近いar^{n - 1}, Kagirinaku 0 ni Chikai ar^{n - 1})
| 6 | July 22, 2014 | 978-4-757-54361-4 | March 26, 2019 | 978-0-316-44749-2 |
27. Thanks (サンキュ。, Sankyu); 28. May They Always Be Happy (しあわせでいてくれますように。, Shiawase de Itekuremasu Yōni); 29. A Sliver of Rainbow (虹のかけら, Niji no Kakera); 30. Mad-Dash Controller (猛進コントローラー。, Mōshin kontorōrā); 31. A Harmony (奏(かなで), Kanade)
| 7 | April 22, 2015 | 978-4-7575-4435-2; 978-4-757-54434-5 (LE) | June 18, 2019 | 978-0-316-44753-9 |
32. That's What's Good About You (きみのいいところ。, Kimi no Ii Tokoro); 33. Takeoff from the Escape Route (逃げ道からのテイクオフ。, Nigemichi Kara no Teiku-ofu); 34. Surprisingly Okay (意外に元気。, Igai ni Genki); 35. Coffee and Milk (コーヒーとミルク。, Kōhī to Miruku); 36. I Remember Everything (全部、思いだしたよ。, Zenbu, Omoidashita Yo); 37. Hajime-kun (はじめくん。); 38. Please Be Friends with me Again (また、友達になってください。, Mata, Tomodachi ni Natte Kudasai)
