= Head Start at Birth =

Japanese web novel series

- Cover of the first manga volume

0歳児スタートダッシュ物語 (0-Saiji Sutāto Dasshu Monogatari)
- Genre: Isekai
- Novel series
- Written by: Umika
- Published by: Shōsetsuka ni Narō
- Original run: September 29, 2019 – July 6, 2021
- Manga
- Written by: Umika
- Illustrated by: Reku Hayase
- Published by: Shusuisha
- English publisher: NA: Coolmic
- Magazine: Shōjo Sengen
- Original run: September 29, 2020 – present
- Volumes: 8
- Light novel
- Written by: Umika
- Illustrated by: Reku Hayase
- Published by: Shusuisha
- Imprint: Shōjo Sengen Novel
- Original run: September 29, 2023 – present
- Volumes: 1
- Anime television series
- Original network: TVS
- Original run: July 7, 2024 – March 23, 2025
- Episodes: 24

Head Start at Birth (0歳児スタートダッシュ物語, 0-Saiji Sutāto Dasshu Monogatari; lit. '0 years old child starting dash story') is a Japanese web novel series written by Umika. It was serialized online from September 2019 to July 2021 on the user-generated novel publishing website Shōsetsuka ni Narō. A manga adaptation with art by Reku Hayase has been serialized online via Shusuisha's Shōjo Sengen digital magazine since September 2020 and has been collected in eight tankōbon volumes. The manga is published digitally in English by Coolmic. A light novel version with illustrations by Hayase began publication digitally under Shusuisha's Shōjo Sengen Novel imprint in September 2023. A short-form anime television series adaptation aired from July to September 2024, with a second season airing from January to March 2025.

== Characters ==
Lilia Carol (リリア・キャロル, Riria Kyaroru)
Voiced by: Hina Kino
Elk von Luxel (エルク・フォン・ルクセル, Eruku fon Rukuseru)
Voiced by: Yoshitaka Yamaya

== Media ==
=== Web novel ===
Written by Umika, Head Start at Birth was serialized as a web novel on the Shōsetsuka ni Narō website from September 29, 2019, to July 6, 2021.

=== Manga ===
No.	Release date	ISBN
1	March 12, 2021	978-4-910429-09-0
2	September 25, 2021	978-4-910429-29-8
3	April 25, 2022	978-4-910429-66-3
4	December 26, 2022	978-4-867780-02-2
5	July 25, 2023	978-4-867780-40-4
6	July 25, 2024	978-4-867780-99-2
7	September 25, 2024	978-4-86778-110-4
8	March 12, 2025	978-4-86778-148-7

=== Light novel ===
No.	Release date	ISBN
1	September 29, 2023	—

=== Anime ===
A short-form anime television series adaptation was announced on June 4, 2024. It aired from July 7 to September 22, 2024, on TVS, and ran for 12 episodes.

A second season was announced on December 1, 2024. It aired from January 5 to March 23, 2025, on TVS.

== Series overview ==
Season	Episodes	Originally released	
Season	Episodes	First released	Last released
1	12	July 7, 2024	September 22, 2024
2	12	January 5, 2025	March 23, 2025

== Episodes ==
=== Season 1 (2024) ===
No. overall	No. in season	Title	Directed by	Written by	Original release date
1	1	"Episode 01"	TBD	TBD	July 7, 2024
2	2	"Episode 02"	TBD	TBD	July 14, 2024
3	3	"Episode 03"	TBD	TBD	July 21, 2024
4	4	"Episode 04"	TBD	TBD	July 28, 2024
5	5	"Episode 05"	TBD	TBD	August 4, 2024
6	6	"Episode 06"	TBD	TBD	August 11, 2024
7	7	"Episode 07"	TBD	TBD	August 18, 2024
8	8	"Episode 08"	TBD	TBD	August 25, 2024
9	9	"Episode 09"	TBD	TBD	September 1, 2024
10	10	"Episode 10"	TBD	TBD	September 8, 2024
11	11	"Episode 11"	TBD	TBD	September 15, 2024
12	12	"Episode 12"	TBD	TBD	September 22, 2024

=== Season 2 (2025) ===
No. overall	No. in season	Title	Directed by	Written by	Original release date
13	1	"Episode 01"	TBD	TBD	January 5, 2025
14	2	"Episode 02"	TBD	TBD	January 12, 2025
15	3	"Episode 03"	TBD	TBD	January 19, 2025
16	4	"Episode 04"	TBD	TBD	January 26, 2025
17	5	"Episode 05"	TBD	TBD	February 2, 2025
18	6	"Episode 06"	TBD	TBD	February 9, 2025
19	7	"Episode 07"	TBD	TBD	February 16, 2025
20	8	"Episode 08"	TBD	TBD	February 23, 2025
21	9	"Episode 09"	TBD	TBD	March 2, 2025
22	10	"Episode 10"	TBD	TBD	March 9, 2025
23	11	"Episode 11"	TBD	TBD	March 16, 2025
24	12	"Episode 12"	TBD	TBD	March 23, 2025
