= Bōshi =

- Also known as: Caps/Hats
- Written by: Shunsaku Ikehata
- Directed by: Hiroshi Kurosaki
- Starring: Ken Ogata; Yukihide Kasahara; Hayami Takahashi; Yūko Tanaka; Aki Asakura; Tetsuji Tamayama; Ittoku Kishibe; Maho Tomita; Hiromi Yuki; Erika Kobayashi; Toshiyuki Kitami; Asae Onishi; Gan Iwata; Teizo Muta; Takayuki Moriwaki; Shin'ya Yamamoto (director); Ryuji Yamamoto; Mitsuomi Aono; Katsuaki Takahashi
- Country of origin: Japan
- Original language: Japanese

Production
- Running time: 90 minutes

Original release
- Network: NHK
- Release: August 2, 2008

Bōshi (帽子) is a Japanese television special directed by Shunsaka Ikehata and starring Ken Ogata. it is about an elderly man who runs an old haberdashery in Kure. The drama, produced by NHK Hiroshima in 2008 for their 80th anniversary, won the valuable TV drama award at the 63rd Japan Agency for Cultural Affairs Art Festival.

== Plot ==
In the port city of Kure, there is an old hat shop. Shunpei, the elderly shop owner, is proud of his career as a skillful hatter, with famous clients such as fleet admiral Isoroku Yamamoto. However, as time goes on, the number of orders decreases and his memory begins to fail him. Shunpei occasionally has to ask his security guard, Goro, to help him find his scissors.

One day, Shunpei discovers his childhood friend, Setsu, is Goro's mother. She left Goro due to an issue with her husband, and now she is in the end stages of cancer. Setsu had been physically weak since childhood, due to radiation exposure from the atomic bombing of Hiroshima in 1945. Shunpei had thought of Setsu as a sister, but he couldn't ask her to live with him in Kure, so she left to earn a living in Hiroshima. He missed her ever since.

Shunpei decides to reunite Goro with his mother. Shunpei knows that Setsu has been living in Tokyo, suffering discrimination as a radiation exposure victim. But when Shunpei finds Setsu, she seems to be living quite happily. Setsu still has a small sailor hat which Shunpei made for her years ago, and which always cheers her up in the face of hardship. Setsu showed the hat to Shunpei, to encourage him and renew his pride. Upon seeing the hat, Shunpei's mind is restored and his forgetfulness disappears.

== Cast ==
- Ken Ogata as "Shunpei Takayama", an older gentleman living alone in port city Kure as a hatter.
- Yukihide Kasahara as 28-year-old "Shunpei", working hard, helping Setsu, and loves her.
- Hayami Takahashi as 6-year-old "Shunpei", likes his father.
- Yūko Tanaka as "Setsu Takemoto", an older lady living in Tokyo with her family, Shunpei's childhood friend, Goro's real mother.
- Aki Asakura as 19-year-old "Setsu", in delicate health, loves Shunpei.
- Tetsuji Tamayama as "Goro Kawahara", Shunpei's security agent and Setsu's son.
- Ittoku Kishibe as "Masayuki Kawahara", Goro's father and Setsu's ex-husband, a doctor and runs his hospital in Hiroshima.
- Maho Tomita as "Yu Takayama", Shunpei's granddaughter living in Tokyo.
- Hiromi Yuki as "Mikazu Kawahara", Goro's stepmother and Masayuki's wife.
- Erika Kobayashi as "Aki Kawahara", Goro's stepsister.
- Toshiyuki Kitami as "Katsuto Takemoto", Setsu's husband, runs his laundry with her.
- Asae Onishi as "Haruko Takemoto", Setsu's daughter.
- Gan Iwata as a chief "Todoroki", Goro's boss.
- Teizo Muta as "Fukuzo", Shunpei's friend.
- Takayuki Moriwaki as Fukuzo's grandchild.
- Shin'ya Yamamoto (actor) as "Futoyama", principal of Kure Sanjyo junior high school, will order student caps to Shunpei.
- Ryuji Yamamoto as "Ichimura", a chairman of the PTA of Sanjyo junior high school.
- Mitsuomi Aono as general "Isoroku Yamamoto",
- Katsuaki Takahashi as "Reikichi Takayama", Shunpei's father made the cap for Isoroku Yamamoto.

== Theme song ==
The theme song is titled Inochi no Uta / (Songs can change the world) and was written for NHK's 80th anniversary. The lyrics invite the public to join the song to collect their messages of life and peace.

- Sora ni Saku Hana / (Flowers bloom in the sky)
  - Sung by Chitose Hajime
  - Written by Yoko Maruyama (selected from 1,904 submissions)
  - Supported by HUSSY R
  - Composed by Yuichi Tajika and Yoshinobu Morikawa
  - Arranged by Takumi Mamiya

The Inochi no Uta Project continued in 2009.

== See also ==
- Japanese television programs
- Kure was the home port of the battleship Yamato, and there was the largest naval port in Asia.
