= One Week Friends (film) =

- Poster
- Japanese: 一週間フレンズ。
- Directed by: Shōsuke Murakami
- Screenplay by: Yōko Izumisawa
- Based on: One Week Friends by Matcha Hazuki
- Starring: Haruna Kawaguchi; Kento Yamazaki
- Music by: Yutaka Yamada
- Production companies: FCC Pictures; Alcon Entertainment
- Distributed by: Shochiku; Warner Bros.
- Release date: February 18, 2017
- Country: Japan
- Language: Japanese
- Box office: US$5.7 million

One Week Friends (一週間フレンズ。, Isshūkan Furenzu.) is a Japanese youth romance film written by Yōko Izumisawa, directed by Shōsuke Murakami, starring Haruna Kawaguchi and Kento Yamazaki. Based on the manga series of the same name, written and illustrated by Matcha Hazuki. It was released in Japan by Shochiku on February 18, 2017. The theme for this movie is "Kanade for Isshukan Friends" by Sukima Switch.

By the first screenings, the film had earned ¥153 million (US$1.34 million).

== Plot ==
High school student and aspiring artist Yuki Hase falls in love at first sight with Kaori Fujimiya after the latter narrowly manages to pass down a borrowed French dictionary Yuki left behind inside a train. To his joy, Yuki learns that he and Kaori share class for their second year. However, Kaori seems to have forgotten their meeting. When he introduces himself again, she rejects his offer of friendship. Yuki later finds out that she has similarly rejected other offers since her transfer 3 months ago and is thus regarded as a pariah within the school.

Nevertheless, Yuki strives for Kaori's friendship, gaining the attention of his teacher, Mr. Inoue. Inoue tells him that due to an accident, Kaori suffers from both retrograde and anterograde amnesia; any memory other than that of her parents is suppressed after a week. Undaunted, Yuki has made up his mind to become Kaori's friend in any way. To remind her of him and other things, he gives her a shared journal, where the two can share their memories every week. By this method, the two slowly grow closer and Kaori becomes more and more open.

In summer, Yuki invites Kaori to attend a fireworks festival alongside his friends Shogo Kiryu and Saki Yamagishi. There, Kaori runs into her middle school friends, Hajime Kujo and Mayu Kondo, the former of whom has just transferred from Sapporo to the same Tokyo school as Yuki and Kaori. Unable to remember them, Kaori attempts to excuse herself, but experiences flashbacks when Kujo calls her a "traitor" and passes out. When she wakes up, she appears to remember him in personal terms.

That autumn, the school holds a fair. Mayu visits the school again to meet Kaori, in the process informing Saki, Kujo, and Shogo of the latter's condition. She reveals that she had indirectly caused Kaori's accident and amnesia. During middle school, when Kujo had to transfer away from Tokyo, he confessed his love for Kaori and asked to meet her one last time before he moved. Words of the confession reached out to the school, ostracizing Kaori due to Kujo's popularity among the female students. They, including Mayu, sabotaged the meeting by throwing insults at Kaori, who fled in shame and was hit by a car. Following this revelation, Kaori fully remembers Kujo. Realizing that he could never compete with someone she remembers permanently, Yuki decides to stop befriending Kaori and tearfully burns the shared journal. Despite this, he politely rejects Saki's love confession several months later, declaring that he only have eyes for Kaori.

The next two spring seasons, Yuki and Kaori graduate. Kaori is called to the library to return a book, which turns out to be the French dictionary Yuki had borrowed a year ago using her member card. She learns that Yuki has illustrated the content of their shared journal into flip book drawings inside the dictionary. Finally remembering him, she rushes to meet him and asks to be her friend, an offer he accepts.

== Cast ==
- Haruna Kawaguchi as Kaori Fujimiya
- Kento Yamazaki as Yūki Hase
- Takashi Matsuo as Shōgo Kiryū
- Shuhei Uesugi as Hajime Kujō
- Haori Takahashi as Saki Yamagishi
- Seika Furuhata as Mayu Kondō
- Shigeyuki Totsugi as Jun Inoue
- Sairi Ito as Fumi
- Masahiro Komoto as Takayuki Fujimiya
- Sayuri Kokushō as Shiho Fujimiya
- Keisuke Okada as Classics Teacher
- Ryō Iwase as Dr. Kanzaki
- Yoshitaka Yamaya as Graduation Announcer (voice)
- Sora Amamiya as School Intercom (voice)
