= Yoshitaka Yamaya =

Japanese voice actor (born 1992)

- 山谷 祥生
- Born: February 15, 1992 (age 34); Sendai, Miyagi Prefecture, Japan
- Occupation: Voice actor
- Years active: 2013–present
- Agent: First Wind Production
- Notable credit: One Week Friends as Yūki Hase

Yoshitaka Yamaya (山谷 祥生, Yamaya Yoshitaka; born February 15, 1992) is a Japanese voice actor. He was previously represented by With Line, but is now currently affiliated with freelancer.

== Filmography ==
=== Television animation ===
2014

- Ace of Diamond, Itsuki Tadano
- Aldnoah.Zero, Okisuke Mikuni
- Magical Warfare, Tsuganashi Aiba (young)
- One Week Friends, Yūki Hase
- Re:_Hamatora, Hikaru

2015

- Ace of Diamond Second Season, Itsuki Tadano
- Aldnoah.Zero, Okisuke Mikuni
- Assassination Classroom, Tomohito Sugino
- Miritari!, Sōhei Yano
- Re-Kan!, Kenta Yamada
- Noragami Aragoto, Tatsumi

2016

- Assassination Classroom 2nd Season, Tomohito Sugino
- Danganronpa 3: The End of Hope's Peak High School, Sosuke Ichino
- Touken Ranbu: Hanamaru, Tōshirō Akita

2017

- Ikemen Sengoku: Toki wo Kakeru ga Koi wa Hajimaranai, Ishida Mitsunari
- Tsukipro The Animation, Kensuke Yaegashi
- The Idolmaster SideM, Kyosuke Aoi

2018

- Amai Chōbatsu: Watashi wa Kanshu Senyō Pet, Myojin Aki
- The Idolmaster SideM Wakeatte Mini!, Kyosuke Aoi
- Black Clover (2018-2021), Marx Francois

2019

- The Rising of the Shield Hero (2019–present), Itsuki Kawasumi
- Ace of Diamond Act II, Itsuki Tadano
- Afterlost, Shunpei
- Kono Oto Tomare! Sounds of Life, Kiyoshi Kasugai
- Welcome to Demon School! Iruma-kun, Shax Reid
- Stand My Heroes: Piece of Truth, Natsuki Sugano
- Stars Align, Yūta Asuka

2020

- If My Favorite Pop Idol Made It to the Budokan, I Would Die, Motoi
- A3! Season Spring & Summer, Muku Sakisaka
- Jujutsu Kaisen, Junpei Yoshino
- Talentless Nana, Moguo's henchman C
- Tsukiuta The Animation 2, Kensuke Yaegashi

2021

- Welcome to Demon School! Iruma-kun Season 2, Shax Lied
- Tsukipro The Animation 2, Kensuke Yaegashi
- Irina: The Vampire Cosmonaut, Franz Felman

2022

- Welcome to Demon School! Iruma-kun Season 3, Shax Lied

2023

- Flaglia, Rabu

2024

- Oblivion Battery, Kazuki Tsuchiya
- Head Start at Birth, Elk von Luxel

2025

- #Compass 2.0: Combat Providence Analysis System, Atari Jūmonji
- Milky Subway: The Galactic Limited Express, Max MacCallister

=== Original net animation ===
- Koro Sensei Quest! (2016), Tomohito Sugino

=== Films ===
- Digimon Adventure: Last Evolution Kizuna (2020), Iori Hida
- Black Clover: Sword of the Wizard King (2023), Marx Francois
- Digimon Adventure 02: The Beginning (2023), Iori Hida
- Assassination Classroom the Movie: Our Time (2026), Tomohito Sugino

=== Games ===
2015

- The Idolmaster SideM, Kyosuke Aoi
- Assassination Classroom: Koro-sensei Dai Hōimō, Tomohito Sugino
- Ikemen Sengoku: Toki wo Kakeru Koi, Ishida Mitsunari
- Touken Ranbu, Tōshirō Akita
- Yume Oukoku to Nemureru Hyakunin no Oujisama, Creto and Azalee
- MapleStory, Jay

2016

- Stand My Heroes, Natsuki Sugano

2017

- A3!, Muku Sakisaka
- The Idolmaster SideM LIVE ON ST@GE!, Kyosuke Aoi
- Anidol Colors, Towa Kazuki
- Dear My Magical Boys, Rin Kuranushi
- Starevo☆彡 88 Constellation Idol Revolution, Shiita Mikekado
- Exile Election, Kaname Ichijou
- Tsukino Paradise, Kensuke Yaegashi

2018

- The Thousand Musketeers, Karl

2019

- Hero's Park, Ohui / Hiiragi

2020

- Exos Heroes, Ramge

2021

- The Idolmaster SideM GROWING STARS, Kyosuke Aoi
- Dream Meister and the Recollected Black Fairy, Liebe
- Devil Butler with Black Cat, Lato Bacca

2022

- Last Period, Venti
- Pokémon Masters EX, Aaron

2023

- Jujutsu Kaisen: Phantom Parade, Junpei Yoshino

=== Drama CDs ===
2022

- Dear Vocalist, SHIZURU

=== Multimedia projects ===
2015

- TsukiPro, Kensuke Yaegashi

=== Live-action ===
- One Week Friends (2017)

=== Dubbing ===
- Hank Zipzer (Nick McKelty (Jude Foley))
