= Nigakute Amai =

- Poster
- Japanese: にがくてあまい
- Directed by: Shōgo Kusano
- Screenplay by: Tomohiro Ōtoshi
- Based on: Nigakute Amai by Yumiwo Kobayashi
- Starring: Haruna Kawaguchi; Kento Hayashi
- Release date: September 10, 2016
- Country: Japan
- Language: Japanese

Nigakute Amai (にがくてあまい; "Bitter Sweet") is a 2016 Japanese romantic comedy film directed by Shōgo Kusano, written by Tomohiro Ōtoshi, starring Haruna Kawaguchi and Kento Hayashi and based on the webmanga series of the same name by Yumiwo Kobayashi. The film was announced on February 19, 2014. It was released in Japan on September 10, 2016.

== Plot ==
Maki Eda (Haruna Kawaguchi) works for an advertising agency at a large company. She is single and doesn't have good luck with men. She also isn't very good at cooking and likes eating junk food. One day, she meets Nagisa Katayama (Kento Hayashi). He is an art teacher and a vegetarian. Unlike Maki, Nagisa cooks very well. The two people then happen to live together. Maki realizes that she is in love with Nagisa, but Nagisa is gay. Through his cooking, they solve their own problems and become important to each other.

== Cast ==
- Haruna Kawaguchi as Maki
- Kento Hayashi as Nagisa
- Yasushi Fuchikami as Arata Tachibana
- Hiyori Sakurada as Minami Aoi
- Mackenyu as Atsushi Babazono
- SU as Yassan
- Hideo Nakano
- Mako Ishino
