= POV: Norowareta Film =

- DVD cover
- Directed by: Norio Tsuruta
- Written by: Norio Tsuruta
- Produced by: Shinya Furugori
- Starring: Haruna Kawaguchi; Mirai Shida; Yasuyuki Hirano; Takashi Kodama; Mayu Miura
- Distributed by: Toho
- Release date: February 18, 2012 (Japan)
- Running time: 92 minutes
- Country: Japan
- Language: Japanese

P.O.V: Norowareta Film (Japanese: ＰＯＶ～呪われたフィルム～, Hepburn: P.O.V. Noowareta Firumu) (also known as P.O.V.: A Cursed Film) is a 2012 Japanese found footage horror film directed by Norio Tsuruta.

== Plot summary ==
During a TV segment about ghost videos, television presenters experience a supernatural incident in a TV studio while one ghost video rolls. They trace the origins of the ghost video to a junior high school where they enter with camcorders to investigate the source of supernatural occurrences.

== Cast ==
- Haruna Kawaguchi
- Mirai Shida
- Yasuyuki Hirano
- Takashi Kodama
- Mayu Miura
- Ami Shimazaki
- Yuki Shinshita
- Yasuto Kosuda
