= Shintarō Tokita =

Japanese musician (born 1978)

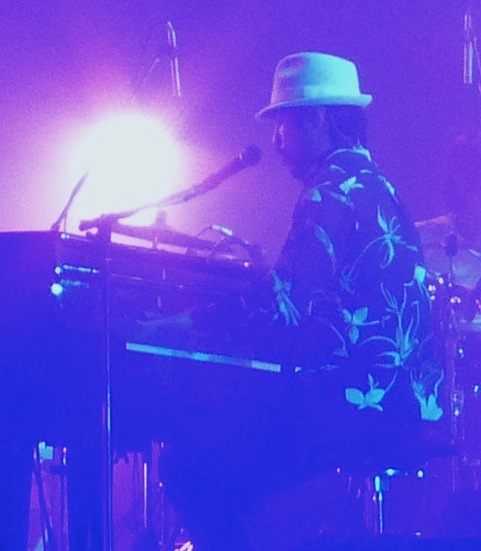
Shintarō Tokita at the end of 2011.

Shintarō Tokita (常田真太郎, Tokita Shintarō) is a member of the J-pop band, Sukima Switch. He was born February 25, 1978, in Midori-ku, Nagoya, Aichi Prefecture Japan. He has also produced Chitose Hajime's comeback single "Kataritsugu Koto", ending theme to Blood+. He enjoys soccer, judo and skiing. He especially loves music. He is usually identified with his large afro and wispy goatee.

In 2008, Tokita produced the winner of the second annual Animax Anison Grand Prix competition, Catherine St. Onge's debut theme song for the anime adaptation of Valkyria Chronicles.
