= Takashi Matsuo (actor, born 1996) =

Japanese actor and singer

- 松尾 太陽
- Born: Matsuo Takashi; September 23, 1996 (age 29); Osaka Prefecture, Japan
- Occupations: Actor, singer

Takashi Matsuo (松尾 太陽, Matsuo Takashi; born 23 September 1996 in Osaka Prefecture) is a Japanese actor and vocalist of boyband Bullet Train.

== Filmography ==
=== Film ===
Year	Title	Role	Director	Notes	Ref
2015	Sideline	Hiromi Okuni		Lead	
2017	One Week Friends	Shōgo Kiryū	Shōsuke Murakami		
2017	Make a Bow and Kiss	Naoyuki Yoshiki	Takeshi Furusawa		

=== Television ===
Year	Title	Role	Network	Notes	Ref
2017	Flower and The Beast	Chihaya Izumi			
