= Spitz (album) =

Studio album by Spitz
- Released: March 25, 1991
- Recorded: October 23 – November 20, 1990
- Studio: Key-Stone Studios, Smile Garage, Sound Inn
- Genre: Post-punk
- Length: 48:17
- Label: Polydor
- Producer: Spitz, Nobuhiko Takahashi

Spitz chronology
Spitz (1991)	Namae o Tsukete Yaru (1991)

Singles from Spitz
- 1. "Hibari no Kokoro / Bīdama" Released: March 25, 1991; 2. "Natsu no Mamono / Ninoude no Sekai" Released: June 25, 1991

Spitz is the first major-label studio album by Spitz, released via Polydor Records in 1991. It peaked at number 60 on the Oricon Albums Chart. In 2007, Rolling Stone Japan placed it at number 94 on its list of the "100 Greatest Japanese Rock Albums of All Time".

== Track listing ==
No.	Title	Writer(s)	Japanese title	Length
1.	"Ninoude no Sekai"	Masamune Kusano	ニノウデの世界	4:30
2.	"Umi to Pink"	Kusano	海とピンク	3:38
3.	"Bīdama"	Kusano	ビー玉	4:42
4.	"Gosenkounen no Yume"	Kusano	五千光年の夢	2:42
5.	"Tsuki ni Kaeru"	Kusano, Tetsuya Miwa	月に帰る	4:26
6.	"Telebi"	Kusano	テレビ	4:08
7.	"Tanpopo"	Kusano	タンポポ	5:08
8.	"Shinigami no Misaki e"	Kusano, Miwa	死神の岬へ	3:44
9.	"Tonbi Tobenakatta"	Kusano	トンビ飛べなかった	3:31
10.	"Natsu no Mamono"	Kusano	夏の魔物	3:10
11.	"Umeboshi"	Kusano	うめぼし	3:36
12.	"Hibari no Kokoro"	Kusano	ヒバリのこころ	4:51

== Personnel ==
Credits adapted from the liner notes.

Spitz

- Masamune Kusano – vocals, acoustic guitar, harmonica
- Tetsuya Miwa – electric guitar, acoustic guitar, electric/acoustic twelve-string guitar, classical guitar
- Akihiro Tamura – four-string bass guitar, eight-string bass guitar
- Tatsuo Sakiyama – drums, tambourine, cabassa, triangle, claves

Additional musicians

- Tsunehiko Yashiro – harmonium ("Bīdama"), ensoliq ("Tsuki ni Kaeru"), Farfisa organ ("Shinigami no Misaki e"), Hammond organ ("Hibari no Kokoro")
- Aska Kaneko – violin ("Umeboshi")
- Jun Takeuchi – violin ("Umeboshi")
- Shigeo Horiuchi – cello ("Umeboshi")
- Shinichi Horiuchi – cello ("Umeboshi")
- Jake H. Conception – bass clarinet ("Umeboshi")

Production

- Spitz – producer, art direction
- Nobuhiko Takahashi – producer
- Juli Kawai – recording engineer, mixing engineer
- Shinya Nakamura – additional engineer
- Jiro Takita – additional engineer
- Koreyuki Tanaka – additional engineer
- Shinji Kobayashi – additional engineer
- Takayoshi Yamauchi – additional engineer
- Reiko Miyoshi – mastering engineer
- Yoshiro Kajitani – art direction, design
- Michiko Arakawa – design
- Masao Torii – photography
- Takeo Ogiso – photography
- Yutaka Yoda – hair, make-up
- Mayumi Katayama – styling
- Yoshitomo Yoshimoto – graphic novel (1997 reissue)
- Stephen Marcussen – remastering engineer (2002 reissue)
- Yoichiro Yamazaki – sleevenotes (2002 reissue)

== Charts ==
Chart	Peak position
Japanese Albums (Oricon)	60

== Release history ==
Country	Date	Label	Format	Catalog number	Notes
Japan	March 25, 1991	Polydor Records	CD	POCH-1080	
Japan	July 7, 1997	Polydor Records	LP	POJH-1009	Reissue
Japan	October 16, 2002	Universal Music Group	CD	UPCH-1181	Reissue, original recording digitally remastered
Japan	December 17, 2008	Universal Music Group	SHM-CD	UPCH-1671	Reissue, original recording digitally remastered
Japan	July 05, 2017	Universal Music Group	LP	UPJH-9024	Reissue, original recording digitally remastered
