= Spitz (band) =

Japanese rock band

Spitz スピッツ
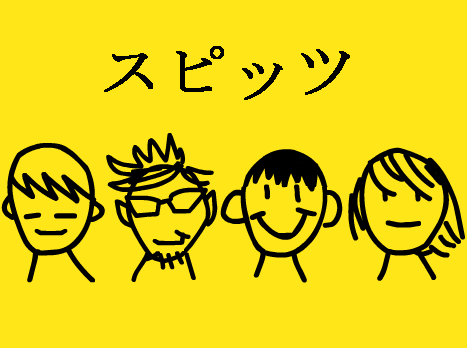

Background information
- Origin: Tokyo, Japan
- Genres: Alternative rock; pop rock; power pop; jangle pop; post-punk
- Years active: 1987–present
- Labels: Polydor; Universal J
- Members: Masamune Kusano; Tetsuya Miwa; Akihiro Tamura; Tatsuo Sakiyama
- Website: spitz-web.com

Spitz (スピッツ, Supittsu) is a Japanese rock band. The group was originally formed in 1987 by four art school students in Tokyo; it consists of Masamune Kusano (lead vocals and rhythm guitar), Tetsuya Miwa (lead guitar), Akihiro Tamura (bass guitar), and Tatsuo Sakiyama (drums).

In March 1991, Spitz released their first single "Hibari no Kokoro" and the self-titled debut album simultaneously on Polydor Records. Although their early efforts failed to attract public attention, the band eventually came into prominence with the single "Robinson" released in April 1995 which sold more than 1.6 million copies in Japan. It was followed by their 6th studio album, Hachimitsu, which was released the same year and achieved mainstream success, immediately topping the Japanese Oricon charts and selling approximately 1.7 million copies. It won the Best Album award in the 37th Japan Record Awards by the Japanese Composers Association on New Year's Eve 1995, and received a quadruple platinum status from the Recording Industry Association of Japan in 1997.

After their breakthrough in the mid 1990s, Spitz has sustained commercial success in Japanese market for nearly 20 years. They have been listed in the top 30 of the best-selling music acts in history of the Japanese record charts, having sold over 20.8 million copies albums and singles domestically as of December 2013.

Throughout their recording career, the band have released over 20 studio albums and over 40 physical singles. Most of their music has a jangly pop-rock sound, featuring arpeggiated guitar work. They are noted for their melodic compositions, imaginative lyrics, and clear high-pitched vocals by the group's singer-songwriter Kusano.

== About Spitz ==
Spitz's musical style is influenced by Donovan, using electric guitar played with arpeggio, and a steady rhythm. Their simple melodies are influenced by popular songs and use Kusano's soft voice.

The band's name was proposed by Kusano and means "sharp and pointed" in German. Kusano liked the "sp" sound (as in "special" or "crispy"). He had wanted to use this name since he was a high school student. Their fan club, Spitzbergen, is named after the Norwegian island Spitsbergen.

In 1995, the album Hachimitsu sold more than one million copies and became very popular. After that, the singles "Sora mo Toberuhazu" (空も飛べるはず) and "Cherry" (チェリー) also became million sellers.

Spitz have repeatedly stated that they deeply value their connection with their audience. Their policy is not to give a performance at a stage bigger than an ordinary concert hall. After becoming a famous band, Kusano said "We are not thinking of giving a performance at Nippon Budokan." However, he also said "I didn’t say we won’t do it forever."

== History ==
=== 1986–1990: Formation and early years ===
In spring 1986, Tokyo Zokei University students Masamune Kusano and Akihiro Tamura met for the first time. Along with fellow drummer Atsushi Ono, they formed the band called the Cheetahs, which was named after the nickname of 1960s Japanese female pop icon Kiyoko Suizenji. The trio had usually performed hard rock-renditions of the Japanese kayokyoku and folk-rock tunes from the 1960s and 70s, such as "365-Ho no March" (Suizenji's signature song) and "Ichigo Hakusho o Mo Ichido" (a song written by Yumi Arai and originally recorded by the Bang Bang). To focus on the stage performance as a frontman, Kusano recruited another guitarist Taku Nishiwaki, and then the band changed its name to the Spitz. However, after the vocalist transferred from Tokyo Zokei University to Musashino Art University, the band itself broke up c. 1987.

After transferring colleges, Kusano continued his friendship with Tamura, frequently playing Nintendo video games with each other. Attempting to form a band again, Tamura brought Tetsuya Miwa, who had been his longtime friend since junior high school, on as a bass player. Miwa, who was a student of Bunka Fashion College, also took his old friend Tatsuo Sakiyama into company as a drummer, who had been in the same folk song club at his art school. All four members of Spitz had gathered by 1988, and they have gone on working together without any lineup changes.

From 1988, Spitz started performing gigs at live houses in Tokyo, such as Shinjuku Jam, and Shibuya Yaneura. Kusano was deeply influenced by The Blue Hearts, one of the most successful and influential Japanese punk rock band at the time, both artistically and musically. He had apparently tried to imitate Hiroto Komoto's idiosyncratic stage presence and vocalizations, on the band's earliest live performances or recordings. A club manager of Shibuya La Mama considered Spitz was just a faceless rip-off of The Blue Hearts. He suggested to the group that they should establish their own artistic identity, or else they would never go anywhere. Afterwards, Kusano stopped acting or writing like Komoto and Masatoshi Mashima, and adapted to acoustic guitar-driven sound that matched with his own wide-ranged soft voice. Songs like "Koi no Uta" and "Hibari no Kokoro" which were officially released, are the earliest materials that Kusano wrote after changing his style of music.

In November 1988, Spitz dropped the self-published single entitled "Tori ni Natte"/"UFO no Mieru Oka" on phonosheet. In 1989, they finally realized their dream of performing live on stage of Shinjuku Loft, a famed live house in Japan at the time. On July 12, 1989, the band performed a solo gig there for the first time, in front of an audience of 300 people. In March 21, 1990, they released the EP entitled Hibari no Kokoro independently on a Mistral label distributed by Shinjuku Loft. It was co-recorded by a then-unknown producer Ryo Yoshimata on keyboards.

By around 1990, some A&R people noticed the band's talent and tried to contract with them. Due to a reluctance to be controlled by a record company, the group rejected to deal with any major record labels, until they found the proper artist management agency. In summer 1990, Spitz built up a business partnership with Road & Sky, the management for a multi-million selling singer-songwriter Shogo Hamada, and signed to Polydor Japan shortly afterwards.

=== 1991–1992 ===
On March 25, 1991, Spitz released their eponymous debut album. Its closing track "Hibari no Kokoro", remake version of the title track for their independent EP, was issued as a single on the same day. In the following month, the album cut "Ninoude no Sekai" got heavy airplay on radio stations in Osaka. Except for a number of shows in small venues, they mainly concentrated on studio work for the rest of that year. Their second LP Namae o Tsuketeyaru came out just 9 months later from its predecessor, followed by their first concert tour started from February 1992.

In April 1992, they released a collection of five new songs (in Japan, those type of releases have been commonly categorized as 'mini album' rather than 'EP') entitled Aurora ni Narenakatta Hito no Tame ni and embarked on its accompanying tour. This symphonic rock-oriented EP was featuring orchestration by its co-producer Tomoki Hasegawa, who previously undertook the strings arrangement of "Majo Tabi ni Deru", the lead single from their second studio album. In the same year, they recorded their third full-length album, Hoshi no Kakera, which came out only 5 months later. It mostly features distorted guitar sound heavily influenced by grunge and shoegazing.

During this period, neither their singles nor albums even reached inside the top 100 on national record charts. Even worse, despite extensive recording sessions and prolific releases they underwent at that time, the band suffered from declining record sales.

=== 1993–1996: Commercial breakthrough ===
Although they had not originally wanted a mainstream success, members of the band had begun to feel sorry for their management team about a string of commercial disappointments. Therefore, they attempted to craft more commercially 'accessible' effort on Crispy!, their 4th album, which started its recording in April 1993. The group committed their album's production to Masanori Sasaji, who has been well known as a record producer for the Unicorn. However, owing to lack of communication between the artist and a producer, frontman was not able to be satisfied with a result of the recording, particularly disliking Sasaji's excessively synthesized sound and brass arrangements. Moreover, at the time of release in September 1993, Crispy! itself failed to chart again and made them devastated. Kusano, who had disliked his own voice, even started to regard his distinctive vocals as the main cause of the band's commercial failure. But after the release of second single from the album, "Kimi ga Omoide ni Naru Mae ni", the situation turned around. It sold modestly and provided the band with first entry on the Japanese Oricon record chart, peaking there at No. 33. As a result, minor hit single boosted the band's ticket sales and enabled them to perform live extensively in larger venues. They reconsidered the partnership with Sasaji, and decided to continue recording together on follow-up album.

In April and July 1994, with Takayuki Hijikata (土方 隆行, Hijikata Takayuki) as producer, the singles "Sora mo Toberuhazu" and "Aoi Kuruma" (青い車) were released and became smash hits. In September, when they installed Sasaji as producer again, they released the 5th album Sora no Tobikata (空の飛び方), which ranked 14th when just released. By the way, this year they appeared in Music Station (TV Asahi’s program) with "Kimi ga Omoide ni Naru Mae ni", in Pop Jam (NHK’s program) with "Aoi Kuruma", in Count Down TV (TBS’s program) with "Spider".

In April of the following year, they released the single "Robinson" (ロビンソン) which placed among the top 10 of the Oricon Charts for the first time and sales exceeded 1.6 million. It ranked in 9th overall in the year. It became a long time seller, which stayed in the top 10 charts for over 30 weeks. In July, the single "Namida ga Kirari" (涙がキラリ☆) also ranked 2nd when just released and its sales were 98,000. At first they couldn't realize these great hits. It was not until they appeared in Meet the World Beat '95 at the Expo in Osaka in July that the members realized they really became stars after hearing great cheers from the audience. In September, they released their 6th album Hachimitsu (ハチミツ) which became a million seller. In October, they started their first long-term tour, and they performed over 40 concerts. In January, the following year, "Sora mo Toberu Hazu" was used as the theme song of Fuji TV network's drama Hakusen Nagashi (白線流し). It became a revival hit and ranked No. 1 in Oricon Charts for the first time as a single. More than 1.5 million copies were sold. (The members say this bewildered them.) In April, the single "Cherry" was also a huge hit with sales of 1,610,000 copies. In October, they released their 7th album Indigo Chiheisen (インディゴ地平線) and started a lengthy tour, which has as many as 70 concerts.

=== 1997–2000 ===
By 1997 (their 10th anniversary) Sasaji withdrew as their producer and all the members were in their thirties. Since they felt they couldn't depend on keeping their producers forever, they determined to stand on their own feet. They began to wonder if they should change the band's course. The band disliked the fact that they had taken on a conventional, orthodox image. So, they held Rock Rock Konnichiwa (ロックロックこんにちは) in Osaka, which became an annual event. They performed a secret live concert at Shinjuku Loft where they mainly played their amateur days’ songs. In March 1998, Yuichi Tanaya (棚谷 裕一, Tanaya Yūichi) joined them as a co-arranger, and they released their self-produced 8th album Fake Fur (フェイクファー). In May 1998, Hiroko Kuji (クジ ヒロコ), the keyboardist, joined the all-over-Japan concert tours, and came to be an essential supporting member of their tours since then. During the tour, in August, they recorded "Hi-Fi, Low-Fi" (ハイファイ・ローファイ, Hai Fai Rō Fai), "Sakana" (魚, Fish) and "Seishun Ikinokori Game" (青春生き残りゲーム) with Kuji, which were collected in the album 99ep.

In March 1999, they compiled some unreleased tracks and released a special album entitled Ka Chou Fu Getsu (花鳥風月) with producer Ryomei Shirai (白井良明). In July of the same year, they appeared in Meet the World Beet in Osaka again. Although they didn't have plans to release new single at that time, they recorded by themselves inside or outside Japan from September to October. They brought "Moon Light" (ムーンライト, Mūn Raito) (already tracked down) and "Funanori" (船乗り) to the United States. After recording "Haru Natsu Rocket" (春夏ロケット) and "Memories" (メモリーズ, Memorīzu), they mixed them down in Miami and mastered them in Los Angeles. Stephen Mackersen, who was in charge of mastering then, would become a necessary engineer for Spitz since 2000, except several singles.

While the members were in America, the recording company decided to sell a "greatest hits" compilation album. The members had no intention of releasing a "best of" album until after their break-up or retirement. However, despite their reluctance, the album Recycle: Greatest Hits of Spitz was released in December of that year. In the end, it became a very successful album with the sales of more than two million copies. However, officially, the band did not recognize the album and did not include the CD in their official discography.

In 2000, they hired Shokichi Ishida (石田 ショーキチ, Ishida Shokichi) as producer and started recording a new album in earnest. The members said it was a big stimulus to cooperate with a contemporary. In July of the year, they released 9th album Hayabusa (ハヤブサ), which is distinguished by its harder rock styling and changed their conventional image. They toured for one year with more than 100 performances.

=== 2001–present ===
After Sasaji's withdrawal, their producer varied with their work, but they installed Seiji Kameda as producer, who is known as a producer of Ringo Shiina since 2001 and himself is a bassist in Tokyo Jihen. In September 2002, they released the 10th album Mikazuki Rock (三日月ロック), which recovered the melody peculiar to Spitz, along with the rock sound of the previous album.

Although they didn't release any singles in 2003, "Star Gazer" (スターゲイザー, Sutā Geizā) was played on TV as the theme song of Ainori from that autumn; it was released in January 2004 to rank 1st in Oricon chart and get many fans. In March 2004, they gathered the songs which hadn't appeared in any albums since 1999 and released special album Iroiro Goromo (色色衣). In January of the following year 2005, they also released the 11th album Souvenir (スーベニア, Sūbenia).

In March 2006, when 15 years had passed since their debut, they released an official single collection album Cycle Hit Spitz Complete Single Collection. The following year marked their 20th anniversary of organization, and they held 20 Shūnen Kinen Matsuri (20周年記念祭り). They released the 12th album Sazanami CD (さざなみCD) in October and went on an all-over-Japan tour from December onwards. Their thirteenth album, Togemaru (とげまる), was released in October 2010.

Spitz provided the opening song "Protect the Light" (灯を護る, Hi wo Mamoru) to the third season of the anime adaptation of Spy x Family.

== Band members ==
- Masamune Kusano (草野 マサムネ, Kusano Masamune), real name 草野 正宗 (same pronunciation) – Lead vocals, rhythm guitar. Born on December 21, 1967, in Fukuoka, Fukuoka Prefecture, Japan. Graduated from Fukuoka Prefectural Jōnan High School, as well as from Musashino Art University with a degree in Design.
- Tetsuya Miwa (三輪 テツヤ, Miwa Tetsuya), real name 三輪 徹也 (same pronunciation) – Lead guitar, backing vocals. Born on May 17, 1967, in Fujieda, Shizuoka Prefecture, Japan. Graduated from Fujieda Meisei High School and Bunka Fashion College.
- Akihiro Tamura (田村 明浩, Tamura Akihiro) – Bass, backing vocals, leader. Born on May 31, 1967, in Fujieda, Shizuoka Prefecture, Japan. Graduated from Shizuoka Prefectural Fujieda East High School. Attended Tokyo Zokei University, but left before graduating.
- Tatsuo Sakiyama (崎山 龍男, Sakiyama Tatsuo) – Drums. Born on October 25, 1967, in Sano, Tochigi Prefecture, Japan. Graduated from Tochigi Prefectural Sano High School and Bunka Fashion College.

== Discography ==
Studio albums

- Spitz (1991)
- Namae o Tsuketeyaru (1991)
- Aurora ni Narenakatta Hito no Tame ni (1992)
- Hoshi no Kakera (1992)
- Crispy! (1993)
- Sora no Tobikata (1994)
- Hachimitsu (1995)
- Indigo Chiheisen (1996)
- Fake Fur (1998)
- Ka Chō Fū Getsu (1999)
- Hayabusa (2000)
- Mikazuki Rock (2002)
- Iroiro Goromo (2004)
- Souvenir (2005)
- SazanamiCD (2007)
- Togemaru (2010)
- Orutana (2012)
- Chiisana Ikimono (2013)
- Samenai (2016)
- Mikke (2019)
- Himitsu Studio (2023)
- Kettle (2026)

== See also ==
- List of best-selling music artists in Japan
