= Haruna Kawaguchi =

Japanese actress and model (born 1995)

- 川口 春奈
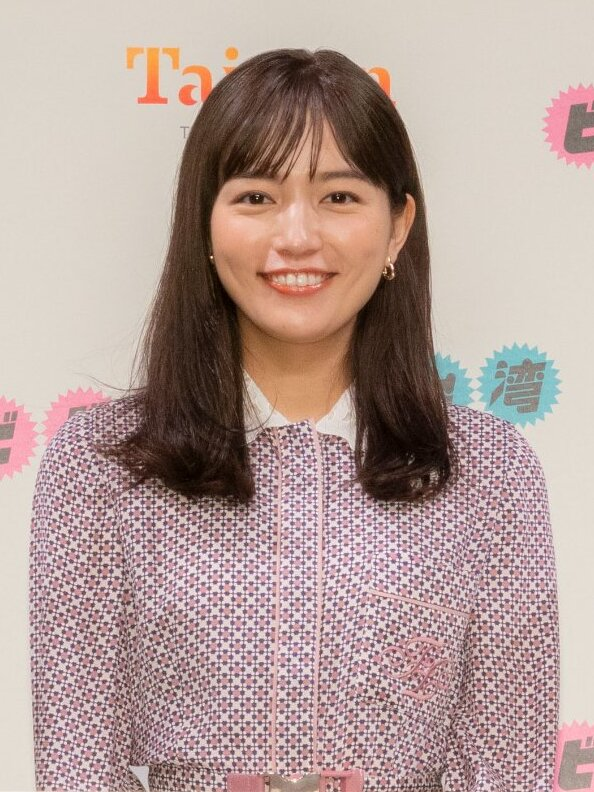
- Kawaguchi at an event in Taiwan on June 23, 2023
- Born: 10 February 1995 (age 31); Gotō, Nagasaki, Japan
- Occupations: Actress; model
- Years active: 2007–present
- Agent: Ken-On
- Spouse: Kō Itakura (m. 2026)
- Website: www.ken-on.co.jp/haruna/

Haruna Kawaguchi (川口 春奈, Kawaguchi Haruna; born February 10, 1995) is a Japanese actress and model under Ken-On. She is best known for playing lead roles in Ouran High School Host Club (2012), POV: Norowareta Film (2012), Zekkyō Gakkyū (2013), Say "I Love You" (2014), and One Week Friends (2017).

== Career ==
In 2007, Kawaguchi won the Grand Prix at the 11th Nicola audition. After joining the child division of Ken-On, she made her debut in the October 2007 issue of Nicola released on September 1 of that year.

From October 4, 2008, to March 28, 2008, she became a regular in the girls' corner on the variety show Fightension☆TV, her first television show. She also performed in the music group merry merry boo in March 2009 when she covered "Ima Sugu Kiss Me", originally by LINDBERG, as part of Fightension☆TV.

In spring 2009, Kawaguchi was selected as the 13th Rehouse Girl of Mitsui's Rehouse. On March 1, she moved from the children's division of Ken-On to Ken-On. Her diary "Haru na Hiyori" on the Ken-On mobile phone website. Her official website was launched in late March. On July 9, 2009, she made her first appearance in a music video with Shunsuke Nakamura for Hi-Fi Camp "Dakara Ippo Mae e Fumidashite" which was used as the commercial song for Pocari Sweat "Unmei no Natsu-hen (Summer Edition of Fate)". In early August, she toured 12 cities across Japan at the event "Pocari Sweat o Nonde Kawaguchi Haruna・Hi-Fi Camp ni Aou! (Let's drink Pocari Sweat and Meet Haruna Kawaguchi and Hi-Fi Camp!)". In October 2009, she made her debut as an actress in the Fuji TV drama Tokyo Dogs.

On March 13, 2010, she had her first lead role in the P&G Pantene drama special Hatsukoi Chronicle. On June 7, 2010, she became the second support girl for Senkou Riot and served as a support girl at "Senkou Riot 2010" held on August 1, 2010. From July 30 to September 2010, she appeared in au LISMO's commercials for LISMO Fes! This commercial was selected for the 2010 CM Grand Prize in the magazine CM NOW. On November 2, she was selected as "Face of the Year" by Nikkei Trendy.

In 2011, she graduated from Nicola and stated that "from now on, I will focus on acting." She has been active as a model since then and has been featured on the covers of magazines like JJ and VOCE; she has also worked on fashion features. In July 2011, she starred in a serial drama for the first time with Ouran High School Host Club which was broadcast in the TSB drama slot "Friday Break". In November 2011, she became the seventh support manager (image girl) for the 90th National High School Soccer Championship.

On March 17, 2012, she starred in the movie Ouran High School Host Club. She released her first photo book "haruna" on March 20, which was shot on Ishigaki Island, her hometown of Goto Islands, and Fukue Island. In 2012 she placed first in MyNavi's "(Men's Edition) Who will be next year's star? Ranking of rookie actresses who will have their big break soon".

On March 24, 2013, she released her second photobook haruna2.

In October 2013, she starred in TBS's Thursday drama Otto no Kanojo (Husband's Girlfriend). It was her first starring role in a prime-time soap opera.

In 2013, she starred in the movie adaptation of Real Escape Game which was also made into a drama Madam Marmalade no Ijō na Nazo. It was released as a mystery solving movie with audience participation called Nazoto Kinema which was divided into "questions" (October 25) and "answers" (November 22).

In October 2014, she starred in her first tage performance at Aoyama Amphitheater "Ikiterumono wa Inainoka".

On February 10, 2015, she released her third photobook haruna3.

In 2020, she played Kicho (Nohime) in the NHK Taiga drama Awaiting Kirin due to the previous actress, Erika Sawajiri, dropping out due to being arrest on suspicion of violating the Narcotics Control Law before the start of broadcasting. This was her first period drama and her first appearance in a Taiga drama. Filming began on December 3 and the broadcast started on January 19, 2020, two weeks behind the originally scheduled January 5, 2020.

On January 31, 2020, she opened her official YouTube channel "Haachannel". The number of channel subscribers exceeded 700 thousand in the first month after opening. She continues to update by posting new videos almost every Sunday. She was adopted as a regular model for the magazine GINGER starting from the May 2020 issue.

On December 31, 2021, she was one of the hosts for the 72nd NHK Kōhaku Uta Gassen with Yo Oizumi and Mayuko Wakuda. Up until the previous year, hosts had been divided into red, white, and neutral, but they were unified as neutral.

In February 2022, she won the Élan d'or Award for Newcomer of the Year, presented to the most promising new actor through the year.

In the first half of 2022, she appeared as the heroine's older sister Ryoko in the NHK serial TV novel Chimudondon, marking her first appearance in a morning drama (Asadora). In the second half of 2022, the NHK serial TV novel "Maiagare!", which is set in the Goto Islands, her hometown, aired, so she narrated in a related program.

On December 15, 2023, Kawaguchi was appointed as the official ambassador for the Persona video game series.

== Personal life ==
Kawaguchi was born on Fukue Island, Goto Islands, Nagasaki Prefecture. From the first to third year of junior high school, when going to work, there was no direct flight to Tokyo, so she traveled to and from Hakata by boat for nine hours. At first this was only once a month, but it gradually increased to once a week.

She is the youngest of three sisters and describes herself as a "genuinely selfish, spoiled, and lonely girl". Her father died when Kawaguchi was 19, and in her Father's Day 2018 Instagram post, she shared a photo of herself saying she "looks too much like her father".

Her name "Haruna" comes from a letter of her grandfather's name, "Haru (Spring)". The "Na" was actually given by her older sister; it was originally supposed to be "Haruna (春菜)" but her mother thought it was "Haruna (春奈)" and delivered it as so to the city hall.

Her hobbies include sea fishing, and she has caught up to 300 fish. Her favorite female artists are Miliyah Kato, Ringo Sheena, and Namie Amuro. Her favorite male artist is EXILE. The entertainer she respects is Miho Kanno, who is also a senior at her company. She is also good friends with Riisa Naka, her costar in Yankee-kun to Megane-chan, who is also from Nagasaki Prefecture.

She said that before she became a Nicola model, she wanted to become a nursery teacher because she likes children. In a 2016 interview, she said that her dream was to become the heroine of a morning drama.

When she appeared in Aitsu Ima Nanishiteru?, according to her classmates from elementary school, Kawaguchi was more funny than cute at the time; she imitated Takayuki Haranishi of FUJIWARA so she was never popular.

=== Marriage ===
On August 2, 2026, Kawaguchi announced her marriage to professional footballer Kō Itakura and her pregnancy with their first child on Instagram.

== Filmography ==
=== Film ===
Year	Title	Role	Notes	Ref.
2011	Moshidora	Yuki Miyata		
2012	POV: Norowareta Film	Haruna Kawaguchi	Lead role	
2012	Ouran High School Host Club	Haruhi Fujioka	Lead role	
2013	The Last Chance: Diary of Comedians	Sakura Kōmoto		
2013	Zekkyō Gakkyū	Kana Araki	Lead role	
2013	The Apology King	a pure actress		
2013	Madam Marmalade no Ijō na Nazo: Question	Madam Marmalade	Lead role	
2013	Madam Marmalade no Ijō na Nazo: Answer	Madam Marmalade	Lead role	
2014	Say "I Love You"	Mei Tachibana	Lead role	
2014	Time Trip App	Eri Morino		
2016	Creepy	Saki Honda		
2016	Bittersweet	Maki Eda	Lead role	
2017	One Week Friends	Kaori Fujimiya	Lead role	
2019	Until I Meet September's Love	Shiori Kitamura	Lead role	
2021	The Cursed Sanctuary X	Kaname Azuma		
2022	The Way of the Househusband: The Cinema	Miku Kuroda		
2024	Don't Lose Your Head!	Kikyo		
2024	Saint Young Men: The Movie	Jossy's Red		
2026	Kyojo: Reunion	Hazuki Hishinuma		
2026	All Our Tomorrows	Nodoka Endo	Lead role	

=== Television ===
Year	Title	Role	Notes	Ref.
2009	Tokyo Dogs	Karin Takakura		
2010	Don't Cry Anymore	Ai Tsunoda		
2010	Hatsukoi Chronicle	Mutsuki Yoneya	Lead role	
2010	Bad Boy and Good Girl	Rinka Himeji		
2010	Koiiro Waltz	Aki		
2010	Zettai Nakanai to Kimeta Hi: Emergency Special	Ai Tsunoda	Television special	
2010	Nagareboshi	Mizuki Yasuda		
2011	Ouran High School Host Club	Haruhi Fujioka	Lead role	
2012	Shirato Osamu no Jikenbo	Haruhi Fujioka	Episode 8	
2012	Hōkago wa Mystery to Tomoni	Ryo Kirigamine	Lead role	
2012	GTO	Miyabi Aizawa		
2012	GTO: Demon Rampage in Autumn Special	Miyabi Aizawa	Television special	
2012	Going My Home	Ruka Kobayashi	Episode 10	
2013	GTO: New Year's Special!	Miyabi Aizawa	Television special	
2013	The Kindaichi Case Files: Hong Kong Murder Case	Miyuki Nanase / Yan Lan	Television special	
2013	3-in-1 House Share	Kaoru Watano		
2013	GTO: Conclusion -Graduation Special-	Miyabi Aizawa	Television special	
2013	Galileo 2	Kanako Mase	Episode 2	
2013	Ghost Negotiator Tenma	Akira Okasaki		
2013	Real Escape Game: Backroom Girls	Madam Marmalade	Episode 11	
2013	Husband's Lover	Hoshimi Yamagishi	Lead role	
2014	The Kindaichi Case Files: Prison School Murder Case	Miyuki Nanase	Television special	
2014	The Kindaichi Case Files Neo	Miyuki Nanase		
2014	Kono Mystery ga Sugoi!	Mayu Takigawa	Lead role; television special	
2015	Detective versus Detectives	Kotoha Minemori		
2016	The State of Union	Akane Irie	Episode 4	
2016	Sakurazaka Kinpen Monogatari	Mina Nagano	Lead role; episode 4	
2016	Juken no Cinderella	Maki Endo		
2016	Chef: Three Star School Lunch	Haruko Takayama		
2016	Cain and Abel	Haruko Takayama	Cameo; episode 6	
2017	My Lover's Secret	Sawa Tachibana		
2018	Shiro to Kiiro: Hawaii to Watashi no Pancake Monogatari	Natsumi Sawano		
2018	My Moochy Boyfriend	Yuriko Kasuga		
2019	Innocence, Fight Against False Charges	Kaede Wakura		
2020	The Way of the Househusband	Miku		
2020–2021	Awaiting Kirin	Kichō	Taiga drama	
2020	Kyojo	Hazuki Hishinuma	Miniseries	
2022	Chimudondon	Ryōko Higa	Asadora	
2022	Silent	Tsumugi Aoba	Lead role	
2023	Hayabusa Fire Brigade	Aya Tachiki		
2024	9 Border	Nana Oba	Lead role	
2025	Ensemble	Sena Koyama	Lead role	
2025	Scandal Eve	Kanade Hirata		

=== Hosting ===
Year	Title	Notes	Ref.
2021	72nd NHK Kōhaku Uta Gassen	with Yo Oizumi	
2023	65th Japan Record Awards	with Shinichiro Azumi	
2024	66th Japan Record Awards	with Shinichiro Azumi	
2025	67th Japan Record Awards	with Shinichiro Azumi	

=== Dubbing ===
Year	Title	Role	Notes	Ref.
2023	Elemental	Ember Lumen		

== Bibliography ==
=== Magazines ===
- Nicola, Shinchosha 1997-, as an exclusive model from 2007 to 2011

=== Photobooks ===
- haruna (March 20, 2012, Wani Books) ISBN 9784847044458
- haruna2 (March 24, 2013, Wani Books) ISBN 9784847045295
- Sonomanma Haruna (March 31, 2014, Tokyo News Service) ISBN 9784863363908
- haruna3 (February 10, 2015, Wani Books) ISBN 9784847047244

== Awards and nominations ==
Year	Award	Category	Nominated work(s)	Result	Ref
2022	46th Elan d'or Awards	Newcomer of the Year	Herself	Won	
2023	16th Tokyo Drama Awards	Best Actress	Silent	Won	
2026	39th Nikkan Sports Film Awards	Best Actress	All Our Tomorrows	Pending	
