= Sukima Switch =

Japanese musical duo (1999-)

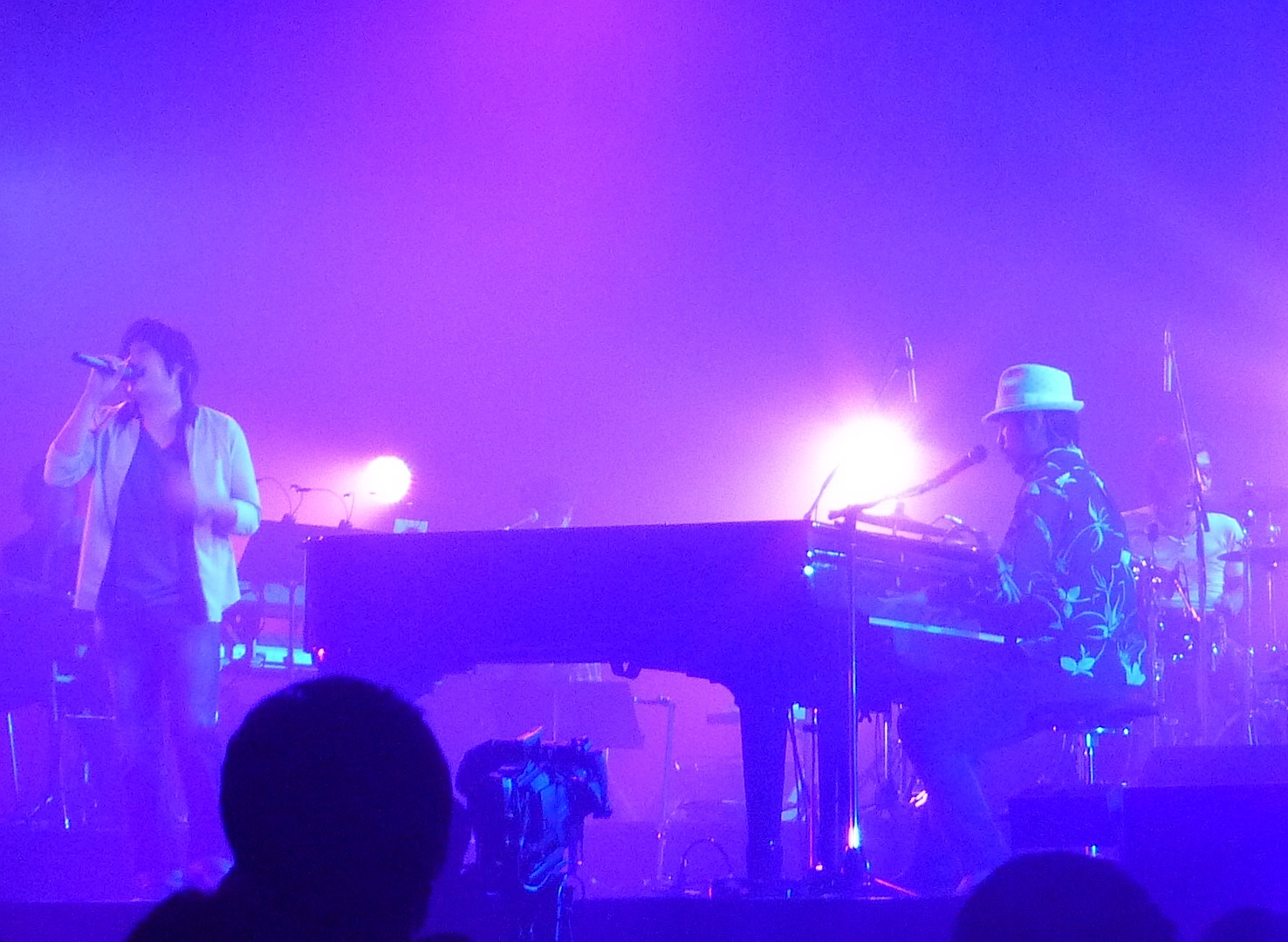
- Sukima Switch performing live, 2011

Background information
- Origin: Japan
- Genres: Pop, jazz fusion, alternative rock
- Years active: 1999–present
- Labels: Ariola Japan; Universal Music (current)
- Members: Takuya Ōhashi; Shintarō Tokita
- Website: Official Website

Sukima Switch (スキマスイッチ) is a Japanese rock/jazz fusion duo consisting of core members Takuya Ōhashi (大橋卓弥, Ōhashi Takuya), born May 9, 1978, and Shintarō Tokita (常田真太郎, Tokita Shintarō), born February 25, 1978, formed in 1999. Formerly with BMG Japan (bought by SMEJ in early 2009), they signed with Sony Music Japan's Ariola Japan label in September 2009.

== History ==
Ōhashi's musical duties include vocals, guitar, and harmonica, while Tokita plays piano/keyboards, numerous other instruments, and oversees overall production. Most of the other instrumentation heard on their albums is played by guests and studio musicians. In this sense, their band structure and chemistry could be compared to that of the American group Steely Dan. Their style is very heavily jazz influenced (another similarity with Steely Dan), yet it retains core pop elements and catchy melodies that have proved popular with Japanese audiences.

== In popular culture ==
Many of Sukima Switch's songs have appeared in anime and video games. Ōhashi also covered the song "Katamari on the Swing" in the PlayStation 3 game Katamari Forever.

- Their second single, "Kanade", was covered by Sora Amamiya and Rie Takahashi for the ending themes to the anime series One Week Friends and Teasing Master Takagi-san 2, respectively. The song was also used as the theme song for the live-action adaptation of One Week Friends.
- Their fifth single, "Zenryoku Shōnen", is featured as the first song in the Nintendo DS game Moero! Nekketsu Rhythm Damashii Osu! Tatakae! Ouendan 2, which was released in Japan on May 17, 2007. The song is also in the expansion pack to the Nintendo DS game Daigasso! Band Brothers. The song was re-released for the Japanese release of Disney and Pixar's 2020 film Onward.
- Their seventh single, "Boku Note", was also used as the theme song for Doraemon: Nobita's Dinosaur 2006.
- The eighth single, "Guarana" is the theme song of the film adaptation of Rough, with their second, third and fifth singles used as inserts.
- The song "Shizuku" is the opening theme for the anime adaptation of the novel series The Beast Player.
- Their 12th single, "Golden Time Lover", is the third opening of the anime series Fullmetal Alchemist: Brotherhood.
- Their 13th single, "Ice Cream Syndrome", is the ending theme of the Pokémon movie Phantom Ruler: Zoroark.
- Their 17th single, "Eureka", is the second opening to the anime Space Brothers.
- Their 19th single, "Hello Especially", is the ending song to the anime Silver Spoon.
- Their 20th single, "Ah Yeah!!", is the second opening to the anime Haikyuu!!.
- Their 22nd single, "Hoshi no Utsuwa" (星のうつわ), is the ending theme song for the anime film The Last: Naruto the Movie.
- Their 23rd single, "LINE", is the eighteenth opening to the anime Naruto Shippuden.

== Discography ==
=== Singles ===
- Debut single – "view" – July 9, 2003
- 2nd single – 奏 ("Kanade") – March 10, 2004
- 3rd single – ふれて未来を ("Furete Mirai o") – June 16, 2004
- 4th single – 冬の口笛 ("Fuyu no Kuchibue") – November 24, 2004
- 5th single – 全力少年 ("Zenryoku Shōnen") – April 20, 2005
- 6th single – 雨待ち風 ("Ame Machi Kaze") – June 22, 2005
- 7th single – ボクノート ("Boku Note") – March 1, 2006
- 8th single – ガラナ ("Guarana") – August 16, 2006
- 9th single – アカツキの詩 ("Akatsuki no Uta") – November 22, 2006
- 10th single – マリンスノウ ("Marine Snow") – July 11, 2007
- 11th single – 虹のレシピ ("Niji no Recipe") – May 20, 2009
- 12th single – ゴールデンタイムラバー ("Golden Time Lover") – October 14, 2009
- 13th single – アイスクリームシンドローム ("Ice Cream Syndrome") – July 7, 2010
- 14th single – さいごのひ ("Saigo no Hi") – January 26, 2011
- 15th single – 晴ときどき曇 ("Hare Tokidoki Kuromi")
- 16th single – ラストシーン ("Last Scene")
- 17th single – ユリーカ ("Eureka") – August 8, 2012
- 18th single – スカーレット ("Scarlet") – June 19, 2013
- 19th single – "Hello Especially" – July 31, 2013
- 20th single – "Ah Yeah!!" – July 23, 2014
- 21st single – パラボラヴァ ("Parabolover") – November 19, 2014
- 22nd single – 星のうつわ ("Star Vessel") – December 3, 2014
- 23rd single – "LINE" – November 11, 2015
- 24th single – 全力少年 produced by 奥田民生 ("Zenryoku Shōnen produced by Tamio Okuda") – November 30, 2016
- 25th single – ミスターカイト / リチェルカ ("Mr. Kite / Ricerca") – September 12, 2017
- 26th single – 青春 ("Youth") – July 3, 2019
- 27th single – "Lovin' Song" – February 21, 2024

=== Mini albums ===
- Debut mini album – 君の話 (Kimi no Hanashi) – September 17, 2003

=== Studio albums ===
- Debut album – 夏雲ノイズ (Natsugumo Noise) – June 23, 2004
- 2nd album – 空創クリップ (Kūsō Clip) – July 20, 2005
- 3rd album – 夕風ブレンド (Yuukaze Blend) – November 29, 2006
- 4th album – ナユタとフカシギ (Nayuta to Fukashigi) – November 4, 2009
- 5th album – musium – October 5, 2011
- 6th album – Sukima Switch – December 3, 2014
- 7th album – 新空間アルゴリズム (Shinkuukan Algorithm) – March 14, 2018
- 8th album – Hot Milk – November 24, 2021
- 9th album – Bitter Coffee – November 24, 2021
- 10th album – A museMentally – July 10, 2024

=== Concept albums ===
- 1st album – re:Action – February 15, 2017
- 2nd album – スキマノハナタバ 〜Love Song Selection〜 (Sukima no Hanataba ~Love Song Selection~) – September 19, 2019
- 3rd album – スキマノハナタバ 〜Smile Song Selection〜 (Sukima no Hanataba ~Smile Song Selection~) – August 19, 2020

=== Compilation albums ===
- 1st album – グレイテスト・ヒッツ (Greatest Hits) – August 1, 2007
- 2nd album – DOUBLES BEST – August 22. 2012
- 3rd album – POPMAN'S WORLD〜All Time Best 2003–2013〜 – August 23, 2013
- 4th album – POPMAN'S ANOTHER WORLD – April 13, 2016
- 5th album – SUKIMASWITCH 20th Anniversary BEST 『POPMAN'S WORLD -Second-』 SNT selection – June 28, 2023
- 6th album – SUKIMASWITCH 20th Anniversary BEST 『POPMAN'S WORLD -Second-』 TKY selection – June 28, 2023
- 7th album – SUKIMASWITCH 20th Anniversary BEST 『POPMAN'S WORLD -Second-』 – July 5, 2023
