= BookLikes =

Social cataloging website

- Website type: Catalog and community
- Available in: English, German, Polish
- Owners: Dawid Piaskowski, Joanna Grzelak-Piaskowska
- Creators: Dawid Piaskowski, Joanna Grzelak-Piaskowska
- Website: booklikes.com
- Registration: Free
- Launched: May 2013; 13 years ago
- Current status: Defunct

BookLikes is a "social cataloging" website founded in June 2011 by Dawid Piaskowski, a software engineer, e-business analyst and entrepreneur, and Joanna Grzelak-Piaskowska, a linguist and literary scholar. The website allows individuals to freely search BookLikes' database of books and reviews. Users can sign up and register books to generate library catalogs. They can also create their own groups of book suggestions and discussions.

Within eight months of beta testing prior to the May 14, 2013 public launch of the website in its current form, it gathered 8000 bloggers. Before its public launch in the current format, BookLikes had won an award as the most innovative small business in Greater Poland, on April 17, 2012. In July 2013, the company also won the Microsoft BizSpark People's Choice Award, at the Microsoft BizSpark Euro Summit in Berlin.

As of October 2013, the website's offices are in Poland; however, founder and CEO Dawid Piaskowski said in a June 2013 interview with the Los Angeles Times that its owners were contemplating a move of its headquarters to the United States, either to New York City or to California, before the end of 2013. Also as of October 2013, roughly 45% of the site's visitors come from the United States; other countries where the website is growing in popularity include Poland, Belgium, Canada, the United Kingdom, the Netherlands, Germany, and Egypt.

== History ==
A first version of BookLikes was launched in June 2011 as a book recommendation engine and social network; a self-described "Facebook for book lovers with price comparison" similar to Goodreads, substantially relying on its own sophisticated book recommendation engine. In this version, the site was presented throughout 2011 at major startup and technology fairs such as Seedcamp (New York), TechCrunch Disrupt (San Francisco), and the 2011 Vienna Startup Week.

During the first months of 2012, a new CTO was hired (Daniel Szwarc), and a German version of the service was launched. The growth of Goodreads, as well as the loss of part of BookLikes's data on the servers of the company initially entrusted with hosting those data, and the discovery that the recommendation engine on which the service, until then, had chiefly relied, was not reaching the site's users in the intended way. This prompted the founders to fundamentally revisit the site's conception. They then redesigned it in the Tumblr-like interactive blog format in which it was eventually launched in May 2013, having won an award as the most innovative small company in Greater Poland already in April 2012.

Within five months of its launch in the redesigned format, the site became one of the top 20,000 websites operative in the United States, the sixth highest-ranked startup in Poland, and one of the top 530-ranked startups worldwide. In July 2013, it also won the influential Microsoft BizSpark People's Choice Award, at the Microsoft BizSpark Euro Summit in Berlin. Like LibraryThing, BookLikes was a major beneficiary of (former) Goodreads users' move towards other book-oriented internet platforms in the wake of Goodreads's acquisition by Amazon.com and a September 2013 change of review-related policy, which left a number of Goodreads users dissatisfied. BookLikes was sold to Legimi in 2016.

== Features ==
BookLikes is currently available in three different languages, English, German, and Polish, and plans to add further languages in the future. On the BookLikes website, users can add books to their standard and personal bookshelves, rate and review books, see what their friends are reading, participate in discussion boards and groups on a variety of topics, and get suggestions for future reading choices. Once a user starts following other users, he will see the users' updates and reviews in his or her "Dashboard" feed. BookLikes also adds their own blog updates to a user's feed. The site provides default bookshelves—Read, Currently reading, Planning to read—and the opportunity to create customized shelves to categorize a user's books. Every book that is added by a user can be added to a wishlist or be marked as favorite or private.

Similar to Tumblr's interface, it lets users access the site on two different levels. On the one hand, a site-wide level, which includes a "Dashboard" feed of items posted by BookLikes and updates from users the user chooses to follow. It also shows the features and services provided directly by BookLikes, such as its recommendation engine, site-related widgets, a presentation of top reviewers, book-related giveaways, "Daily Deals" and other so-called "Goodies", a "friend invite" scheme, discussion groups, and certified author pages for users who are authors themselves. The site also created an official BookLikes group where users can offer feedback and suggestions for new features. On a second, parallel level, users create their own blogs which other users can subscribe to and which can be customized based on templates provided by BookLikes. The website allows users to link their own website or blog with BookLikes, which then replaces the blog BookLikes offers its users. Users may also customize their blog's layout with HTML.

Users can write posts and each post can be marked as a review. BookLikes features a rating system of one to five stars, with the option of using half-stars. Users can accompany their review with a rating or rate a work without writing a review. By reblogging posts, users can share reviews or updates of other users or repost their own updates and users can like posts of others.

The website facilitates reader interactions with authors through giveaways, authors' blogs, and profile information.

Since March 2013, BookLikes also allows its users to link their BookLikes account to affiliate marketing programs, such as Amazon.com Associates and The Book Depository Affiliates in order to generate revenue. The profits of these affiliate programs go entirely to the users. Book data are sourced through a cooperation with major book sellers in the United States, the United Kingdom, Canada, Poland, Germany, France, Austria, Italy, Spain, the Netherlands, Sweden, and China; according to the site's press release at the time of its May 2013 launch, the addition of other cooperation partners (also in further countries) is in the works.

== See also ==
- aNobii
- BookArmy
- Bookish
- Douban
- Goodreads
- iDreamBooks
- LibraryThing
- Shelfari
- Tumblr
