= Babelio =

French social cataloging and book website

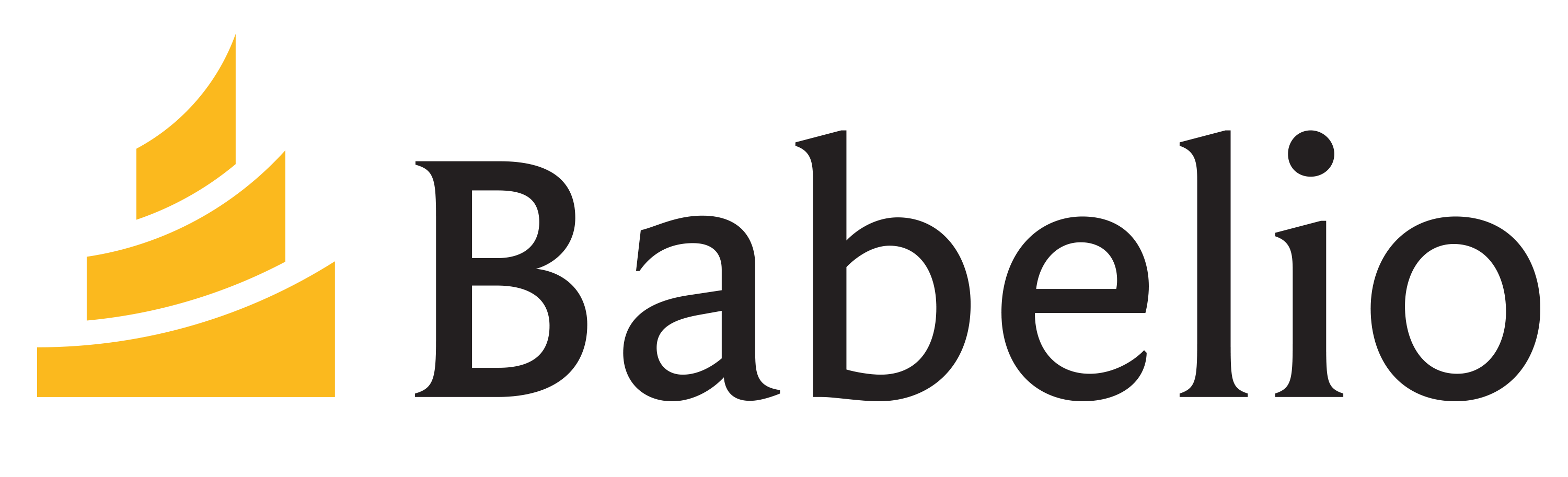
- Website type: Catalog and community
- Available in: French; Spanish
- Headquarters: Paris, France
- Founders: Guillaume Teisseire; Vassil Stefanov; Pierre Fremaux
- Website: www.babelio.com
- Commercial: No
- Registration: Free
- Launched: January 2007; 19 years ago
- Current status: Active

Babelio is a French social cataloging website and a mobile app dedicated to literature. It is a social network for users to review books and generate personal library catalogs, which can be shared and commented on by other users.

It has been called the French equivalent of Goodreads.

== History ==
Babelio was launched in January 2007 by three bibliophiles: Guillaume Teisseire, Vassil Stefanov and Pierre Fremaux. It began as a social media website specializing in books. In France, Babelio was the first of its kind to be created. It is supported by publishers such as Éditions Albin Michel, Éditions du Seuil and Fayard. Many of the site's most active users receive copies of books in advance from various publishers and are invited to share their reviews. Users can participate in the "Masse critique" contest to win book copies.

In October 2018, Babelio had 650,000 users and was visited monthly by approximately 3.7 million internet users. By June 2020, Babelio had a community of 950,000 users. By June 2021, Babelio had a community of 1.1 million users.

== Features ==
=== For the general public ===
For the books that are in their library, users have the ability to rate, write a review, extract quotes, create thematic lists, participate in games and create quizzes. Members also have a personalized home page that offers a news feed related to their literary tastes. Based on members' libraries and the ratings they have given to books, the site also offers users the opportunity to discover other user with similar literary tastes. Users also have the opportunity to converse through a group function, allowing them to send public messages. A thematic labeling system also allows users to navigate the database of books. Users thereby explore using keyword clouds, offering a collaborative and community form of classification.

Babelio offers excerpts from reviews and links to the vast majority of professional literary columns published in the general and specialized press. Columns from a large number of media sources are thus included in the cataloging data of each book.

The site also offers a mobile application compatible with the iOS and Android operating systems.

At the beginning of 2018, Babelio launched a Spanish-language version of their website.

=== For literary professionals ===
Babelio offers a social network of authors intended to connect writers and their readers according to their literary tastes. The site also offers public libraries the opportunity to enrich their catalogs with community content (reviews, quotes, keyword clouds) through its Babelthèque website.

== Prix Babelio ==
In 2019, Babelio launched its annual readers' prize, the Prix Babelio, which rewards 10 winners in 10 categories. The first edition of the prize was awarded on 19 June 2019 and was decided as the result of 29,000 votes by 7,000 participating users. The 2nd Prix Babelio was awarded on 17 June 2020 as the result of 50,000 votes by 11,500 voters participating users. The 3rd Prix Babelio was awarded on 17 June 2021 as the result of 52,500 votes by 11,000 voters participating users. The 4th Prix Babelio was awarded on 15 June 2022 as the result of 51,000 votes by 10,000 voters participating users. The 5th Prix Babelio was awarded on 15 June 2023 as the result of 70,000 votes by 14,000 voters participating users. The 6th Prix Babelio was awarded on 12 June 2024 as the result of 78,000 votes by 16,000 voters participating users.

=== Winners ===
Year	French literature	Foreign literature	Crime and thriller	Comics	Manga	Children's	Young adult	Speculative fiction	Romance	Non-fiction
2019	Né d'aucune femme by Franck Bouysse	Killing Commendatore by Haruki Murakami	Surface by Olivier Norek	En route vers de nouvelles aventures Lou!, by Julien Neel	The Promised Neverland by Kaiu Shirai and Posuka Demizu	Engrenages et sortilèges by Adrien Tomas	Un si petit oiseau by Marie Pavlenko	Une sirène à Paris by Mathias Malzieu	Laisse tomber la neige by Cécile Chomin	À nous la liberté ! by Christophe André, Alexandre Jollien and Matthieu Ricard
2020	Mamma Maria by Serena Giuliano	The Testaments by Margaret Atwood	Victim 2117 by Jussi Adler-Olsen	Sacrées sorcières by Pénélope Bagieu	Witch Hat Atelier by Kamome Shirahama	Legacy by Shannon Messenger	Heartstopper by Alice Oseman	Je suis fille de rage by Jean-Laurent Del Socorro	La vie a plus d'imagination que nous by Clarisse Sabard	Votre temps est infini by Fabien Olicard
2021	Chère Mamie au pays du confinement by Virginie Grimaldi	Le Fabuleux Voyage du carnet des silences by Clare Pooley	Le Mystère de la main rouge by Henri Lœvenbruck	Ne m'oublie pas by Alice Garin	The Apothecary Diaries by Hyūganatsu, Itsuki Nanao and Nekokurage	J'ai 14 ans et ce n’est pas une bonne nouvelle by Jo Witek	Le syndrome du spaghetti by Marie Vareille	Les voleurs de fumée by Sally Green	Les étoiles brillent plus fort en hiver by Sophie Jomain	Vivre avec nos morts by Delphine Horvilleur
2022	Les Douleurs fantômes by Mélissa Da Costa	Blackwater by Michael McDowell	Dans les brumes de Capelans by Olivier Norek	Lore Olympus by Rachel Smythe	Spy × Family by Tatsuya Endo	Mémoires de la forêt : Les Souvenirs de Ferdinand Taupe by Mickaël Brun-Arnaud and Sanoe	La Passeuse de mots, L'Œil de la vérité by Alric and Jennifer Twice	Capitale du Nord: Citadins de demain by Claire Duvivier	Vous reprendrez bien un peu de magie pour Noël ? by Carène Ponte	Les Fossoyeurs by Victor Castanet
2023	Les Femmes du bout du monde by Mélissa Da Costa	La Petite Fille by Bernhard Schlink	La Constance du prédateur by Maxime Chattam	Le Cœur en braille by Joris Chamblain and Anne-Lise Nalin	Orange, tome 7 by Ichigo Takano	Les gens sont beaux by Baptiste Beaulieu and Qin Leng	Just wanna be your brother by Nine Gorman and Mathieu Guibé	Fairy Tale by Stephen King	Captive, tome 2 by Sarah Rivens	Seul l'espoir apaise la douleur by Simone Veil
2024	Cinq cœurs en sursis by Laure Manel	Les Armes de la lumière by Ken Follett	Les Secrets de la femme de ménage by Freida McFadden	La Route by Manu Larcenet	Le Voyage de Shuna by Hayao Miyazaki	Les femmes aussi ont fait l'Histoire by Titiou Lecoq	L'Effet boule de neige by Clara Héraut	Babel by R. F. Kuang	Fourth Wing by Rebecca Yarros	Ma vie sans gravité by Thomas Pesquet

== See also ==
- aNobii
- BookArmy
- Bookish
- Goodreads
- LibraryThing
- Shelfari
