= The StoryGraph =

Book cataloguing social website

- Website type: Social cataloging, book reviewing, metadata aggregation
- Available in: English
- Founded: 2019; 7 years ago
- Founder: Nadia Odunayo
- Website: app.thestorygraph.com
- Commercial: Yes
- Registration: Optional
- Current status: Active

The StoryGraph (or simply StoryGraph) is a social book cataloging platform launched in 2019. Users can rate and review books, keep track of books they have read and would like to read, and join reading challenges. The platform also offers reading recommendations based on analyses of users' reading habits. Most StoryGraph features are free to use, with additional reader statistics features on a paid tier. The StoryGraph is often positioned as an alternative to Amazon-owned Goodreads. It is available on desktop, iOS, and Android. In 2025, the iOS app was a recipient of the 2025 App Store Awards.

As of January 2026, the platform had passed 5 million user signups.

== History ==
The StoryGraph was created by software engineer Nadia Odunayo in 2019, initially as a side-project for tracking books. Based on the comments of Goodreads users and other book readers, Odunayo focused on the implementation of systems on the platform for personalized book recommendations.

After the 2024 United States elections, it received a surge of new users, including up to nearly 25,000 new subscribers in a single day. Discussion to switch from the Amazon-owned Goodreads began online and on BookTok, with readers motivated to protest against Amazon owner Jeff Bezos's support of Donald Trump.

The platform passed 4 million user signups in April 2025 and reached 5 million users in January 2026.

== Features ==
=== Book discovery ===
The platform builds recommendations based on analyses of users' reading habits. Users can add books to their collections, rate and review books, and follow their friends' activities. Users can rate books on a scale of one to five stars (with partial stars allowed) and leave written reviews. User profiles can be made public, set to members-only, or kept private.

=== Reader statistics ===
StoryGraph also offers an annual "Reading Wrap-up" report in which a user can review their reading history from the prior year, summarizing statistics including the number of pages read; the number of books read; and the user's average book length and preferred genres.

The paid membership, "The StoryGraph Plus", costs $50 a year as of 2023 and provides additional statistics and recommendations, the ability to vote and comment on upcoming features via the StoryGraph roadmap website, and priority support.

=== Community ===
The StoryGraph allows users to set reading goals for the year according to number of pages or hours spent reading. Users can also join community challenges focusing on books from various genres or books from around the world. The app supports a variety of book discussion club activities for both public and private book clubs.

The StoryGraph also hosts book giveaways, where users can enter and be randomly selected for free books.

=== Integrations ===
Starting in June 2026, Kobo eReaders will support syncing reading progress into StoryGraph.

=== Comparison to Goodreads ===
The StoryGraph positions itself as "a fully-featured Amazon-free alternative to Goodreads". Both sites allow readers to add books to their reading list, log and review books, and set reading challenges. As compared to Goodreads, The StoryGraph focuses more on giving users access to their analytics, rather than on social interaction. For example The StoryGraph users only gained the ability to like reviews in February 2026 and still cannot comment on reviews.

== Reception ==
Reception to the platform has been largely positive, with praise for its recommendations system, clean interface, and detailed reading statistics.

Polygon wrote, "StoryGraph provides an improved reading app experience is by deprioritizing ratings, which have become a leading contributor to Goodreads’ toxic culture," and praised the platform for focusing instead on details such as genre, pacing, and mood.

Chris M. Arnone of Book Riot commended The StoryGraph for not being affiliated with Amazon and for distancing itself from Amazon products, but criticized the platform for its lack of a strong social community, stating, "this is the most glaring place where The StoryGraph falls behind Goodreads. The community on Goodreads is huge, with multiple groups and social media connections to automatically add people you know in other spaces. The StoryGraph just doesn't have any of that. There are no API tie-ins to other social media platforms at this time. This not only means you can't import friends from Facebook or Twitter, but you can't directly post from The StoryGraph to those platforms. While this might be something they're working on, this lack of interaction hurt my review of The StoryGraph. The StoryGraph does provide the ability to search for similar users based on your reading preferences. That's as far as the community goes right now."

Mara Franzen, another writer for Book Riot, took a different view than her colleague, arguing, "I have been a die-hard Goodreads fan since 2016, but after spending time with StoryGraph, I think I might make the switch. It's just so much more user-friendly, and I was recommended so many books that I'm actually interested in. I loved being able to see my reading data and was even surprised by it a bit."

== See also ==
- aNobii
- Babelio
- Bookish
- douban
- Goodreads
- LibraryThing
- Open Library
- Readgeek
- Library 2.0 – the concept behind Goodreads and similar sites
- The Hawaii Project
