= Celebrity biographer =

Type of author

Celebrity biographers are authors who specialize in writing sensationalized books about the lives of celebrities. Historically, biographers have been limited to those who specialized in literary works on important personalities or those officially commissioned by a living person or if deceased, by the estate to provide a biography of that person. In recent years, the term "celebrity biographer" has come into existence. ForeWord Magazine notes that "There is the literary biographer and the celebrity biographer." Designed to be entertainment, books by celebrity biographers are often referred to as "quickie" biographies due to the limited amount of research done vis-à-vis that of a literary biographer. Books about celebrities have existed for many years but the advent of the personal computer (PC) reduced writing and editing costs substantially. Combined with the Internet, that provided massive sources and easy contact, the PC created an explosion of celebrity books beginning in the early 1990s. Because of these technological tools, early writers on celebrities such as Fred Lawrence Guiles who wrote Norma Jean; the life of Marilyn Monroe in 1969 were able to substantially increase their book output while some newer celebrity biographers produce a book almost on an annual basis.

Celebrity biographies are published by small specialty publishers as well as major publishing houses, sometimes through an imprint. It can be a very profitable sideline and for some small publishing houses it is an important supplemental source of revenue that keeps them afloat in the highly competitive book market. This is the case for small presses such as ECW Press who advertise that they publish "biographies of today's best-known rock stars, writers, artists, and television personalities."

== Legal actions ==
By the mid-1990s, fierce competition in the celebrity biography field developed that brought even more sensationalist claims. Statutes in the United States and other countries prohibit libel lawsuits for anything written or said about a deceased person and some celebrity biographers have taken advantage of this to make questionable assertions. In certain egregious cases, respected book reviewers such as Publishers Weekly have gone out of their way to caution readers by noting that the subjects "conveniently for legal purposes, are deceased." However, for living people, the courts can and have become involved when the subject of a book believes their character has been deliberately harmed. Such was the case with the unauthorized biography Child Bride: The Untold Story of Priscilla Beaulieu Presley by Suzanne Finstad, published in 1997 by Harmony Books. Presley filed a $10 million defamation action in Los Angeles County Superior Court against the book's primary source, Lavern Currie Grant, a former Army buddy of her late ex-husband who claimed she had sexual intercourse with him in exchange for an introduction. In response, Grant filed a $5 million countersuit, saying Presley defamed him by stating he repeatedly tried to rape her in the 1950s. On August 19, 1998, Judge Daniel A. Curry found Grant guilty of defamation and ordered him to pay $75,000. However, Finstad and the publisher of her book weren't sued and say they stand by the account in the book. Moreover, in 2010, author Alanna Nash unearthed a confidential settlement agreement between Grant and Presley that puts a different light on the outcome of the court case. On the one hand, it says, Presley can tell the media that she feels "vindicated" by the result of her lawsuit. On the other, Grant will not have to pay a cent in damages provided he never discusses her again in public. Furthermore, while Grant will no longer claim to have had sex with Presley, she will no longer accuse him of attempted rape and will pay him $15,000 for pictures he took when she was a teenager.

== Some celebrity biographers ==
- Ellis Amburn
- Christopher Andersen
- Kate Andersen Brower
- Peter Biskind
- Patricia Bosworth
- David Bret
- Michael Feeney Callan
- Suzanne Finstad
- Albert Goldman
- Boze Hadleigh
- Anthony Hayward
- Laura Jackson
- Kitty Kelley
- Patrick McGilligan
- Andrew Morton
- Michael Munn
- Alanna Nash
- James Robert Parish
- Herbie J Pilato
- Darwin Porter
- Lawrence J. Quirk
- Frank Sanello
- Richard Schickel
- William Schoell
- Robert Sellers
- Bob Spitz
- Donald Spoto
- J. Randy Taraborrelli
- Marshall Terrill
- Christopher WilsonSandra Ahunsi

== See also ==
- Tabloid journalism
