= Litsy =

Social media application

Litsy is an iOS and Android social media application and website that is based around reading books. It was launched in April 2016. Some book releasers have used it for their marketing.

== History ==
Litsy was founded by Todd Lawton and Jeff LeBlanc, founders of the apparel and gift company Out of Print. They had the idea of fans of Out of Print being able to connect with each other. The website was launched in April 2016 and was designed similarly to Instagram and Twitter, however, it is meant only for books. The book title information comes from Google and Ingram. Lawton stated, "I think we may be the first apparel company that has transitioned into becoming a tech startup". It is not considered to be an extension of the earlier company. The book cataloging social network LibraryThing acquired Litsy in 2018. The acquisition allows Litsy to access LibraryThing's book database and for users to sync the services. It received 20,000 users from spring 2016, to June 10, 2016. A version for Android was later released as well as a website.

== Features ==
Users can make three types of posts which are a quick blurb, a quote, or a review and all posts can have a maximum of 300 characters. Posts can be marked as having spoilers when they are submitted. They can also "like" books, upload photos, use emojis, and create virtual stacks of books. Every user has a "Litfluence" score which shows how influential each one of them is on Litsy.

Some publishers, bookstores, and authors have used the application for promotion of their books. Joe Hill promoted his novel The Fireman before it was published, which gained user attention. Penguin Random House and Harper Perennial use Litsy to promote their books.

== Reception ==
Neilie Johnson of Common Sense Media wrote, "This app is an interesting mashup of social media and books, but its glitches and emphasis on status hamper it" and that "it's simpler than Goodreads".
