= Su Min =

Chinese feminist icon and influencer

- Born: 1964 (age 61–62)
- Other name: "Road Trip Auntie"
- Known for: Prominent Chinese feminist icon
- Spouse: Du Zhoucheng

Su Min (born 1964), known as the Road Trip Auntie, is one of China's most prominent feminist icons and influencers whose video diaries driving over 180,000 miles have inspired women to leave suffocating marriages and abusive relationships.

Her story has been made into a movie, Like a Rolling Stone (出走的决心), and seen her celebrated on BBC's 100 Women in 2024.

== Biography ==
Su Min was born in 1964 in Changdu Xizang Autonomous region in Tibet where she lived until 1982. After that, Su Min spent most of her life in Zhengzou, Henan Province.

== Married life ==
At the age of 23, she graduated from a college and later met her future husband through a blind date. She eventually married Du Zhoucheng after meeting for at least three times. Su later mentioned that she married Du "really to avoid my father's control, and to avoid the whole family".

Life after marriage was not as happy as Min would have hoped. Her husband was abusive, and has admitted to hitting her in a video shared on Douyin. She had not married for love but hoped that love would come. A daughter did come however, and for that reason alone she stayed and endured the abusive marriage. Eventually, after her daughter had twins and made her a grandmother, Su Min fell into moderate depression.

Min's mother dissuaded her from getting a divorce leaving Min feeling hopeless. Su Min's decision to drive away from her old life was fueled by a desperate need to escape her abusive marriage. She promised to help look after her grandchildren until they reached kindergarten but after that then she would have to leave.

== Life on the road ==
Having lived in Zhengzhou for most of her life, Min drove away from her marriage and family alone in the fall of 2020 - "escaping" from her husband, daughter, grandson.

Su Min set out from Henan and drove tens of thousands of kilometers to Hainan, passing through more than 230 cities in China. She had to live frugally on her pension so thought video blogs might help her raise some money but she had no idea that they would go viral. In the videos, she processes her past, sharing what she is cooking, where she is going to travel to next. When she visited a spice market, she would smell the chili peppers as, for her, the smell evokes "the smell of freedom" because throughout her marriage spicy food was forbidden by her husband who didn't like it.

Su Min mentioned that she initially thought her husband's behaviour might improve with time and distance, but he remained abusive when she returned and only called her twice in the years she was away - once because her highway access card was tied to his credit card and he wanted her to return 81 yuan (£8.91).

She filed for divorce with her husband in 2024 after four decades of marriage and much deliberation due to family pressures and cultural stigma, but her husband refused to divorce her initially. Chinese divorce law often deny petitions, force couples into mediations that disadvantages the woman or frequently ignore claims of domestic violence even with ample evidence, and courts typically protect the integrity of marriage for social stability as opposed to women's rights. Su Min eventually negotiated out-of-court with her husband and settled on paying him 160,000 yuan (US$21,900) but the divorce certificate has yet to come through due to a cooling-off period, as of January 2025. She mentioned that despite being upset as it was all the money she had, she mentioned that "freedom is more important".

== Influence ==
Her road trips since 2020 over 180,000 miles and her video diaries earned her "millions of cheerleaders online" and turned her into a "hero for women who felt trapped in their own lives." Despite having never been out of China, she plans to see Switzerland and Paris in the future.

Her story has also been made into a film, released in September 2024 and titled, Like a Rolling Stone (出走的决心). The film, however, does not depict the full extent of Su's experience, particularly the many years of her husband's domestic violence. The actor who plays the husband also faced criticism for giving a "restrained" performance, but the film's director Yin Lichuan admitted that no male actors were willing to play such a role. The film gained mostly positive reactions with an average rating of 8.6 out of 10 on Douban. Whilst some Weibo users were critical of her decision to leave her family for tourism and called her selfish, the film sparked a nationwide conversation and many users commented that it made them look at society with new perspectives.

In December 2024, Su Min was named in the BBC's 100 Women list of 100 inspiring women.
