= The Sitting Room Library =

Public library and archive in Penngrove, California

Coordinates: 38.3336°N 122.6660°W

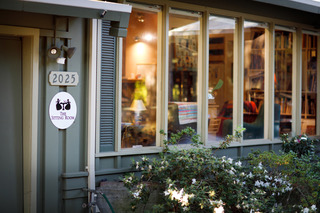

The Sitting Room Library is a reading room and archive in Penngrove, California, US, that provides the community with access to women's literature and art.

== History ==
Established in 1981 by June Farver, Jane Flood, Marylou Hadditt, Susan Miller, Karen Petersen, D.A. Powell, and J.J. Wilson. Recognizing the lack of access to books by and about women, a call for donations went out, and soon a library was established as a non-profit to house the growing collection of women's literature and other resources. Named the Sitting Room Library, it began in a rented office building in Cotati, California. In 2004 the library moved to a house in Penngrove.

Inspired by the Morrison Reading Room at the UC Berkeley University Library, the Sitting Room began as a place for women to gather, hold salons, and celebrate the cultural contributions of women artists and writers. The library's collection of books began with donations provided by early visitors and volunteers and has expanded to over 7,000 titles.

== Special collections and projects ==
=== Woolf Wall ===
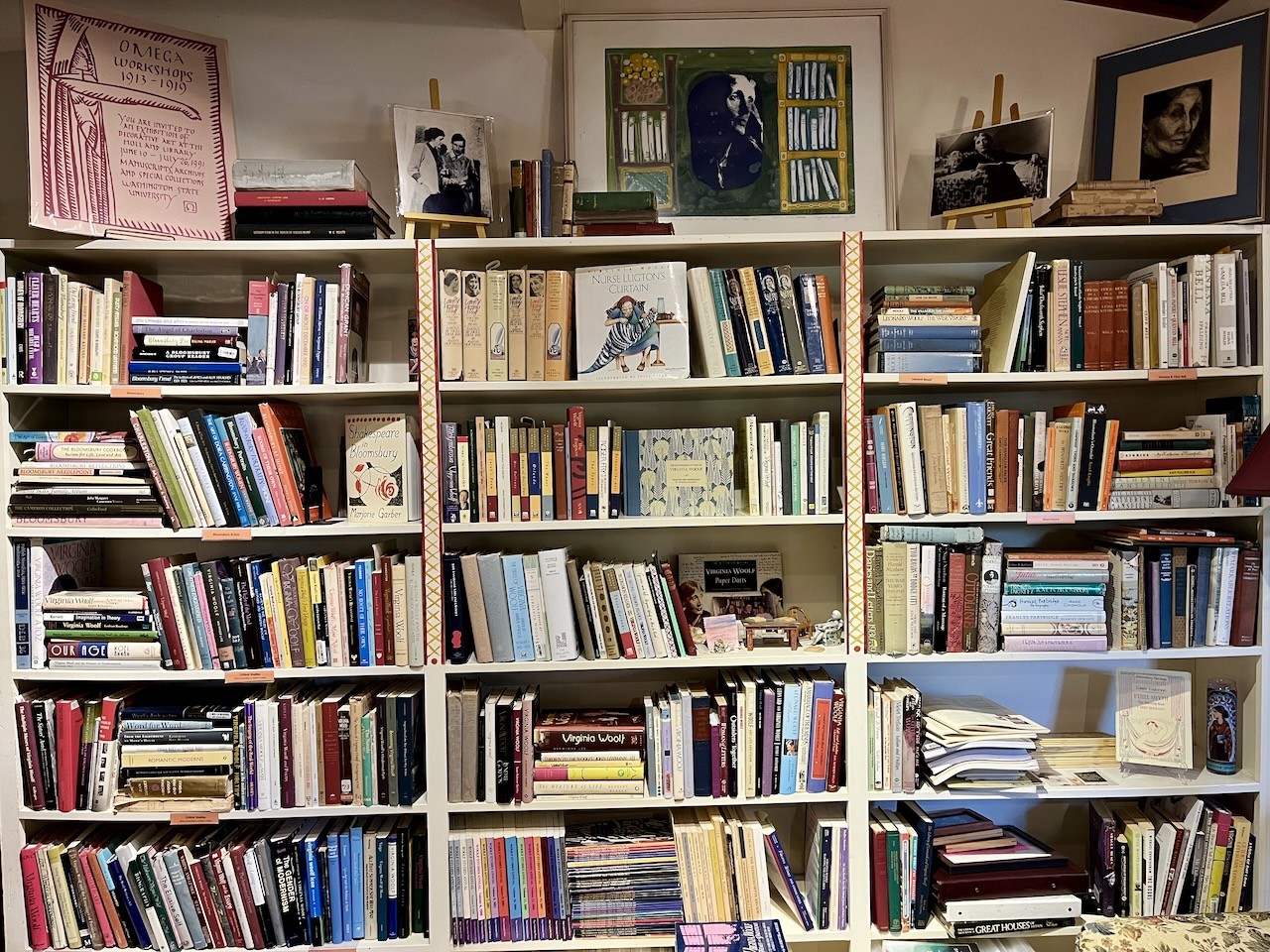
The Virginia Woolf and Bloomsbury Collection at The Sitting Room Library

The Sitting Room Library books and archives began in the early 1970s as a collection of one of the Sitting Room's founders, J.J. Wilson. Her long interest in the British modernist writer, Virginia Woolf (1882–1941) has resulted in a wide assortment of books by and about Woolf, her family and the Bloomsbury Group of her talented friends ranging from the economist, John Maynard Keynes to the art critic, Roger Fry. The Woolf Wall, as it is called, includes all of Virginia Woolf's published novels and short fiction, as well as complete sets of the Collected Essays, Letters, and Diaries. The Wall also includes books that span over fifty years of scholars’ writings about Virginia Woolf, her craft, her reception, and her life. Archived documents include a complete set of The Virginia Woolf Miscellany (VWM), which was first published in 1973 at Sonoma State College (now Sonoma State University) with the stated goal of putting “Woolf readers in touch with one another”. The evidence of the success of the VWM goal can be found in the correspondence and documents that fill the VWM archive file. The Woolf Archives are also home to documents, articles, essays, and correspondence from Woolf scholars and common readers collected over the past fifty years. The 300 volumes of the Woolf Wall can be searched via the online catalog, https://www.librarycat.org/lib/Sitting_Room/.

=== Archives ===
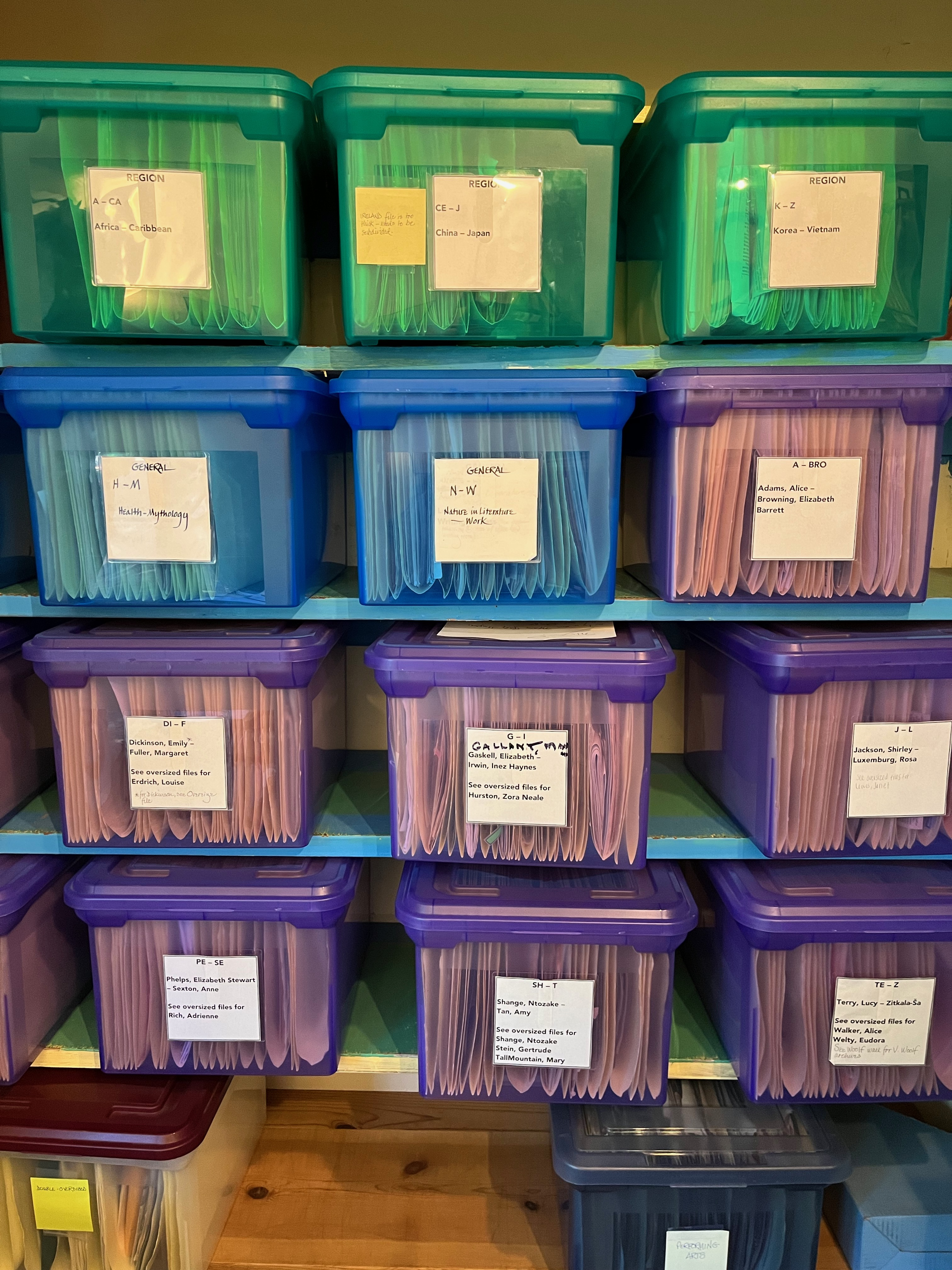
Women Writers Archive

In support of the collection, the Sitting Room Library maintains an archive of women writers, poets and artists. Tillie Olson, Meridel Le Sueur, Ntozake Shange, Rebecca West and hundreds more are included, forming a rich vein for research. Composed of articles, catalogs, photographs and correspondence, the Sitting Room Library Archive is fully integrated with the online catalog, Tiny Cat, and searchable remotely.

=== Poetry and "Spineless Wonders" ===
The Jane Flood Poetry Room houses two thousand volumes of poetry and over 400 “Spineless Wonders” (unbound, small press publications and zines), contributed by poet D. A. Powell. The collection features regional, national and international poets.

=== Obituaries ===
Since its inception, the Sitting Room Library has collected Women's obituaries from a wide variety of sources, most recently the New York Times Overlooked feature. There is also an annual workshop dedicated to writing one's own obituary.

=== Annual anthologies ===
Every year the Sitting Room Library issues a call for contributions to its Annual Publication. Themes are suggested and all contributions are published in the Sitting Room Annual Publications.

=== Book Group and Roundtables ===
In addition to serving as a library, the Sitting Room also sponsors a Book Group and a variety of Roundtables designed around a common theme. Current information can be found on the website https://sittingroomlibrary.org/.

=== Online catalog ===
The Sitting Room Library and Archive is fully searchable via the online catalog, Tiny Cat.

Full information is available on the Sitting Room Library website.

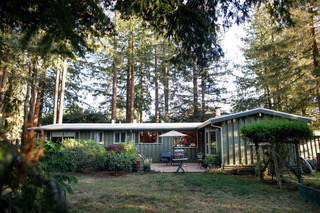
