= Darwin Porter =

American travel writer (born 1937)

Darwin Porter (born September 13, 1937, in Greensboro, North Carolina) is an American travel writer, producing numerous titles, mostly for the Frommer guidebook series, over a 50-year career span. In the 21st century, he became a pop culture journalist-historian, and celebrity biographer.

== Career ==
In 1958, he joined The Miami Herald as an entertainment writer, book reviewer, and columnist. Later, he was appointed Bureau Chief of The Miami Herald in Key West, where he was a frequent visitor to Havana, writing about the growing tensions between the United States and Cuba. Once, he was taken into the hills to meet a guerilla fighter, Fidel Castro. In Key West, he conducted extensive interviews with Harry S Truman, who had made Key West his winter White House during his presidency.

In Key West, he was befriended by playwright Tennessee Williams, who introduced him to a number of stars, such as Vivien Leigh, Marlon Brando, and Paul Newman, as well as such literary figures as Truman Capote, Christopher Isherwood, and Gore Vidal. Porter would later write biographies of these personalities. In 2014, he would publish a biography, Pink Triangle, devoted to Williams, Capote, and Vidal.

In New York in 1961, Porter was named vice president of Haggart Associates at the age of 24. Working with the company president, Stanley Mills Haggart, a noted interior designer, author, and magazine editor, they produced some of TV's most-watched commercials, specializing in hiring movie stars to sell their products. Haggart had the Pepsi-Cola account, the soft drink promoted by Joan Crawford. They also produced 20-minute musical shorts starring such entertainers as Lena Horne and Louis Armstrong.

A world traveler, Porter, in 1969, wrote the first Frommer's guidebook. (Before that, the series produced a $-a-Day series.) In terms of volume, he would write more travel guidebooks than all others, over a 50-year span. In the 1970s and 80s, and into the 90s, the Frommer guidebook series was the market leader. The books were published, over the years, by Arthur Frommer, Inc.; Simon & Schuster; and John Wiley & Sons.

Porter also wrote and updated subsequent editions of travel guides for Lufthansa, American Airlines, TWA, Iberia Airlines, Greyhound, British Airways, SAS Scandinavian Airlines, American Express, TAP Air Portugal, Air France, and Alitalia.

Porter is also a novelist. His first novel Butterflies in Heat was reviewed by James Kirkwood, Jr., the Pulitzer Prize-winning author of A Chorus Line, with “Darwin Porter writes with an incredible understanding of the milieu—hot enough to singe the wings off any butterfly.” Butterflies in Heat was later adapted into the film, Tropic of Desire.

Other novels include Marika, based in part on information gleaned from Porter's long association with German and Austrian stars such as Hedy Lamarr, Marlene Dietrich, and Greta Keller, the leading chanteuse of Europe during the 1930s. He also wrote Venus, a novel suggested by the life of the acclaimed diarist, Anaïs Nin. Other novels include Blood Moon, Hollywood’s Silent Closet, Razzle-Dazzle, Midnight in Savannah, and Rhinestone Country.

In the 21st century, for Blood Moon Productions, Porter has produced more Hollywood celebrity biographies than any other journalist, concentrating on iconic stars and personalities such as Marilyn Monroe, Howard Hughes, Elizabeth Taylor, Vivien Leigh, Laurence Olivier, Humphrey Bogart, Steve McQueen, Marlon Brando, Katharine Hepburn, Zsa Zsa Gabor, Peter O'Toole, Rock Hudson, Debbie Reynolds and her daughter Carrie Fisher, Linda Lovelace, Burt Reynolds, and Kirk Douglas.

He has written biographies of TV personality Merv Griffin, singers Michael Jackson and Frank Sinatra, lawman J. Edgar Hoover and politicians — Bill & Hillary Clinton, Ronald & Nancy Reagan, Donald Trump, and the Kennedys.

Porter is also the author of four books on film criticism and has written a series of exposés as part of Blood Moon's Hollywood Babylon series.

These biographies, based on the compilation of firsthand, orally transmitted histories, have illuminated aspects of Hollywood history previously unknown to the general public. Some of Porter's works have been serialized by major newspapers in the UK, including The Mail on Sunday. The Sunday Times defined Porter's biography of Marlon Brando (Brando Unzipped) as “Lurid, raunchy, perceptive, and certainly worth reading ... One of the ten best showbiz biographies of the year.”

As a biographer, usually in collaboration with Danforth Prince, Porter has won numerous awards from, among others, the New England Book Festival, the Hollywood Book Festival, the Los Angeles Book Festival, the New York Book Festival, The Northern and Southern California Book Festivals, The Florida Book Festival, the San Francisco Book Festival, The Benjamin Franklin Awards, The IBPA Awards, and the Beach Book Festival.

His biographies and travel guides have been translated into many languages, including French, Italian, Dutch, German, Portuguese, Spanish, and Chinese.

Most of his biographies were published by Blood Moon Productions, a New York City-based press directed by former New York Times reporter Danforth Prince, and distributed through the National Book Network and later, through Ingram and Amazon. Blood Moon originated as the Georgia Literary Association in 1997, adopting its current name in 2004.

== Review ==
According to Paul Bellini at FAB Magazine, "I love the Porter/Prince books.They are the biographies I dreamed about as a child. Bill & Hillary is amazing and fascinating, the story of a young lawyer with intense ambition, who meets a young man with the same intense ambition, and how they both maintained political careers while surviving scandal after scandal. There's all the regular stuff, like the impact of Monica Lewinsky and the embarrassment it caused, and there is also the Vince Foster story ... which reads like a great, tragic, doomed love story, one that changed Hillary forever. “Bill & Hillary brims with Washington gossip of the era, like when teenage Laura Bush ran over and killed her ex-boyfriend, or the fact that the White House hid Reagan’s Alzheimer’s so that he could finish his second term with dignity, even if he didn’t know where he was. "The Clintons are a modern political dynasty, like kings and queens of yore. Bill & Hillary So This Is That Thing Called Love is the story of how his charm and her ability to command respect have kept them in the political eye for more than 25 years. Hillary ran for the Democratic candidacy before, and lost to Obama, but this time she’s ready. Even if she doesn’t win, she has earned her place in history, not just as a First Lady, but as a political legend.”

== Published works ==
Frommer's travel guides.

Novels

- Blood Moon (1999)
- Butterflies in Heat (1976)
- Hollywood’s Silent Closet (2001)
- Marika (1977), with its Dutch translation
- De weg naar de Top (1977)
- Midnight in Savannah (2000),
- Razzle-Dazzle (1995)
- Rhinestone Country (2002)
- Venus (1982)

Biographies written in collaboration with Danforth Prince

- The Secret Life of Humphrey Bogart: The Early Years (1899-1931) (2003);
- Katharine the Great—Hepburn, Secrets of a Lifetime Revealed (2004);
- Howard Hughes, Hell’s Angel (2005);
- Brando Unzipped (2006);
- Jacko, His Rise and Fall—the Social and Sexual History of Michael Jackson (2007);
- Hollywood Babylon—It’s Back! (2008);
- Merv Griffin, A Life in the Closet (2009);
- Paul Newman, The Man Behind the Baby Blues (2009);
- Steve McQueen, King of Cool, Tales of a Lurid Life (2009);
- Hollywood Babylon Strikes Again! (2010);
- Humphrey Bogart: The Making of a Legend (2010);
- Damn You Scarlett O’Hara, The Private Lives of Vivien Leigh and Laurence Olivier (co-authored with Roy Moseley, 2011);
- The Kennedys, All the Gossip Unfit to Print (2011);
- Frank Sinatra, The Boudoir Singer (2011);
- Elizabeth Taylor, There is Nothing Like a Dame (2012);
- J. Edgar Hoover and Clyde Tolson—Investigating the Sexual Secrets of America’s Most Famous Men and Women (2012);
- Marilyn at Rainbow’s End—Sex, Lies, Murder, and the Great Cover-up (2012);
- Those Glamorous Gabors, Bombshells from Budapest (2013);
- Inside Linda Lovelace’s Deep Throat—Degradation, Porno Chic, and the Rise of Feminism (2013);
- Pink Triangle—The Feuds and Private Lives of Tennessee Williams, Gore Vidal, and Truman Capote (2014);
- Jacqueline Kennedy Onassis: A Life Beyond Her Wildest Dreams (2014);
- Love Triangle, Ronald Reagan, Jane Wyman, & Nancy Davis (2014);
- Peter O'Toole, Hellraiser, Sexual Outlaw, Irish Rebel (2015);
- Bill & Hillary, So This Is That Thing Called Love (2015);
- Donald Trump, The Man Who Would Be King (2016);
- James Dean, Tomorrow Never Comes (2016);
- Lana Turner, Hearts & Diamonds Take All (2017);
- Rock Hudson, Erotic Fire (2017);
- Carrie Fisher & Debbie Reynolds: Princess Leia & Unsinkable Tammy in Hell (2018);
- Playboy's Hugh Hefner: Empire of Skin (2018);
- Kirk Douglas More Is Never Enough: Oozing Masculinity, a Young Horndog Sets Out to Conquer Hollywood & To Bed Its Leading Ladies (2019).
- Burt Reynolds: Put the Pedal to the Metal, 2019
- Historic Magnolia House: Celebrity and the Ironies of Fame, 2018
- Glamour, Glitz, and Gossip at Historic Magnolia House, 2019
- Judy Garland & Liza Minnelli: Too Many Damn Rainbows, 2020
- The Seductive Sapphic Exploits of Mercedes de Acosta, Hollywood's Greatest Lover, 2020
- Marilyn: Don't Even Think About Tomorrow, 2020
- Lucille Ball & Ricky Ricardo (1911-1960), Volume I of a Two-Part Biography, They Weren't Lucy & Desi, 2021.
- The Sad & Tragic End of Lucille Ball (1961-1989), Volume II of a Two-Part Biography; 2021
- Hollywood Babylon, with Detours to Gomorrah; 2022
- Henry Fonda, Volume One (1905-1960) of a Two-Part Biography: He Did It His Way; 2022
- The Fondas, Henry, Jane, & Peter, Volume Two (1961-1982) of a Two-Part Biography, TRIPLE EXPOSURE; 2022
- The Donald: How Did It Happen?--The Gathering Storm; 2023
- Hollywood Remembered, Glamour, Glitz, Triumph, & Tragedy: A Tribute to the Glory Days of Entertainment & the Way We Were; 2024
- Lurid Scandals Never Die: Blood Moon's Media Buzz, Everything You Ever Wanted to Know But Were Afraid to Ask
- Blood Moon Productions: Its Origins, Its Oeuvre, Its Sources, and Its Legacy (2025)
- Clark Gable, King of Hollywood (1901-1928); Volume One of a Three-Part Biography; 2025
- Clark Gable, Gone With the Wind (1938-1939); Volme Two of a Three-Part Biography; 2026

Film Criticism written in collaboration with Danforth Prince
Best Gay and Lesbian Films—The Glitter Awards 2005; Blood Moon’s Guide to Gay & Lesbian Film (2006 and 2007 editions); Fifty Years of Queer Cinema—500 of the Best GLBTQ Films Ever Made (2010)

Movie Scripts A Simple Chemical Transfer (Voted as Best Industrial Film of 1977); Tropic of Desire (1977), starring Eartha Kitt, Matt Collins, Barbara Baxley, and Pat Carroll

Contributing Interviewee for Documentaries
Marlon Brando (2006), for German TV; Queer Icon: The Cult of Bette Davis (2010)

Commentator for Audio Tracks on DVD Releases of Classic Films:
The Call of the Wild (1935), starring Clark Gable and Loretta Young; Deadline U.S.A. (1952), starring Humphrey Bogart and Ethel Barrymore; The Rains of Ranchipur (1955), starring Lana Turner and Richard Burton
