= Kiera Cass =

American writer of young adult fiction

- Born: May 19, 1981 (age 45); Myrtle Beach, South Carolina, U.S.
- Occupation: Writer
- Spouse: Callaway Cass (m. 2004)
- Children: 2
- Writing career
- Years active: 2009–present
- Genre: Young-adult fiction
- Website: kieracass.com

Kiera Cass (born May 19, 1981) is an American writer of young adult fiction, best known for The Selection series. After the general success of the first book in The Selection series and a controversial conversation between Cass and her agent, Elana Roth, Cass continued the series, writing a trilogy from the main character's point of view, two sequel books focused on the original main character's daughter, and several novellas based in the world of The Selection. Cass continued her writing career, rewriting and releasing her 2008 online novel, The Siren. Since the republication of this book in 2016, Cass has released a duology, The Betrothed and The Betrayed, and a 2022 standalone novel titled A Thousand Heartbeats, which is her most recent.

== Career ==
Cass was born and raised in Myrtle Beach, South Carolina and graduated from Socastee High School in Myrtle Beach. She is of Puerto Rican descent. She attended Coastal Carolina University before transferring to Radford University. She graduated from Radford with a degree in History and art. The first book in The Selection trilogy, The Selection, was published in 2012 by HarperTeen. Television rights for the trilogy were optioned by the CW Television Network and two pilots were filmed, but neither were picked up for a full series. In April 2015, movie rights for The Selection trilogy, The Selection were acquired by Warner Bros. The rights were then bought by Netflix. After three years in development, the adaptation was scrapped.

In May 2013, Cass announced that she would be working on an as-yet untitled series she refers to as 238 on social media, to be published by HarperCollins. The series was cancelled and Cass pursued other projects.

On August 14, 2014, Kiera Cass announced that The Selection series would be expanding into more books. First, The Elite, was published in 2013. "The One" followed. The Heir followed in 2015. Cass announced another book following The Heir, The Crown, which was released on 3 May 2016.

On August 20, 2015, Kiera Cass announced that her originally self-published book The Siren would be rewritten and rereleased on January 26, 2016.

On October 7, 2019, Kiera Cass announced that her novel The Betrothed would be released on May 5, 2020. It followed Hollis Brite, a daughter of nobility, who was courted by King Jameson of Coroa to be his queen. Hollis fell in love with an Isolten commoner named Silas, and she had to choose between two paths. The book became a #1 New York Times bestseller.

The sequel to The Betrothed, titled The Betrayed, was released on June 29, 2021.

Kiera Cass' latest book, A Thousand Heartbeats, was released on November 29, 2022.

== Personal life ==
Cass has been married to Callaway Cass since 2004. They have two children, a son and a daughter. They have lived in Los Angeles, California and Christiansburg, Virginia.

== The Selection ==
The Selection Series
- The Selection; The Elite; The One; The Heir; The Crown
- Author: Kiera Cass
- Country: United States
- Language: English
- Genre: Young adult, Dystopian, Romance
- Publisher: HarperTeen
- Published: 24 April 2012 – 3 May 2016
- Media type: Print (hardback & paperback); Audiobook; E-book
- No. of books: 5

The Selection series, which is what Cass is best known for, is a series of 5 YA novels set in the fictional country of Illéa, formerly North and Central America. The books are about a competition known as The Selection, where citizens of Illéa compete for the current king's heir in marriage. The first three books are from the point of view of America Singer, joining the selection after bribery from her mother, who doesn't know she is in love with Aspen, who is a caste lower than her. The two sequels, The Heir and The Crown are written from the point of view of Princess Eadlyn, the firstborn daughter of Prince Maxon and Lady America Singer.

=== Reception ===
The A.V. Club commented that the first book in the series "is something of a Hunger Games rip-off, but at least it's an entertaining one".

On 4 February 2015 The Guardian posted a review about Kiera Cass, saying, "Cass makes it a suspenseful read with dramatic events and romantic moments and you never know what is coming up in the next chapter". On 24 October 2015, The Guardian added, "The story is also excellent for gripping people who don't generally enjoy reading".

== The Siren ==
Cass is also the author of The Siren. This book is about Kahlen, a girl who lost her family when the cruise ship they were on overturned. Then she was chosen to become a siren and needs to serve the Ocean for a hundred years. Her voice is deadly for humans. One day she meets Akinli, the boy of her dreams, and wants to be with him but she can't. She struggles with her emotions for a while as her "sisters" try to talk her out of him.

Cass originally self-published "The Siren" online in 2008. On January 26, 2016, it was released by HarperCollins after Cass rewrote it into an updated version.

== Controversy ==
On 12 January 2012 a one-star review of The Selection was posted on the book reviewing site Goodreads, and on the reviewer's blog. Later on the same day, Kiera Cass' literary agent, Elana Roth, posted a series of derogatory tweets on Twitter. In a conversation that Cass and Roth allegedly believed was private—but was, in fact, public—Roth called the reviewer names and both Roth and Cass discussed how best to bump the negative review down and boost positive reviews by manipulating the ranking system themselves. The controversy sparked an article by Publishers Weekly speaking out against this practice and raised an outcry from multiple reviewers, bloggers, and publications against the cyber-bullying of non-professional reviewers by authors and agents.

== Bibliography ==
=== The Selection series ===
1. The Selection (2012)
2. The Elite (2013) (ISBN 978-0-06-205997-0)
3. The One (2014) (ISBN 978-0-06-205999-4)
4. The Heir (2015) (ISBN 978-83-7686-368-9)
5. The Crown (2016)

==== Novellas ====
- The Prince (2013)
- The Guard (2014)
- The Selection Stories: The Prince & The Guard (2014)
- The Queen (2014)
- The Favorite (2015)
- The Selection Stories: The Queen & The Favorite (2015)
- Happily Ever After (contains all of the above Novellas and The Maid) (2015)

=== Stand-alone novels ===
- The Siren (2009)
- A Thousand Heartbeats (2022)

=== Short stories ===
- "In the Clearing" in Brave New Love: 15 Dystopian Tales of Desire, ed. by Paula Guran (Robinson, 2012).

=== The Betrothed ===
- The Betrothed (2020)
- The Betrayed (2021)
