= Child Bride: The Untold Story of Priscilla Beaulieu Presley =

1997 book by Suzanne Finstad

- Author: Suzanne Finstad
- Language: English
- Genre: Biography
- Publisher: Harmony Books
- Publication date: 1997
- ISBN: 0-517-70585-0

Child Bride: The Untold Story of Priscilla Beaulieu Presley (ISBN 0-517-70585-0) is a book written by Suzanne Finstad in 1997. It is an account of Priscilla Presley's life which differs from her own account in her book, Elvis and Me. However, it has been also found that the book relied heavily on the controversial statements made by Currie Grant.

== Background ==
Published by Harmony Books, (1st First Edition), it painted Priscilla Presley in a negative light. The sources of this book are several people who knew Elvis Presley and Priscilla well, among them many friends from Priscilla's childhood and adolescence, Elvis's stepbrother Rick Stanley, Mike Edwards, Elvis's ex-girlfriends and members of the Memphis Mafia. The author writes that Priscilla agreed to have sex with Currie Grant, a married, 27-year-old man who knew the singer, so that she could meet Elvis and that she was not a virgin on her wedding night. While being interviewed for this book, Currie Grant also claims that Elvis and Priscilla had sex on one of their first few dates in Germany and not on their honeymoon, as she claimed in her own autobiography.

The book also says that Priscilla didn't want to come to live with Elvis, but that her marriage was part of a mastermind for fame hatched by her parents and that Priscilla was also in love with other boys from her high school and had sexual relationships with them. Her parents had also forced Elvis to marry Priscilla against his will. It also describes the often dark side of their sensational marriage.

== Reaction ==
Finstad takes many quotes that Priscilla has made and calls them a web of lies that she has spun in publications such as Elvis and Me.

Priscilla Presley filed a lawsuit against Currie Grant for his claims in the book, stating in her action that his claims were fabrications. On August 19, 1998 Los Angeles Superior Court Judge Daniel Curry found defendant Currie Grant guilty of defamation and ordered him to pay $75,000. (Priscilla had sued for at least $10 million.) "I am very pleased that I have been vindicated by this judgment," she said in a statement. The Contra Costa Times of August 26, 1998 commented, "She didn't say if she was pleased with her winnings." In addition to the required pay, the ruling found that Currie had not only made false statements which were repeated, but that these statement were also, as the Chicago Tribune noted, "used as the source for the book “Child Bride: The Untold Story of Priscilla Beaulieu Presley” by Suzanne Finstad."

However, Suzanne Finstad and the publisher of the book weren't sued. Finstad and her publisher also say they stand by the account in the book.

At least one reviewer for The StoryGraph referred to Child Bride as "idiotic" and "pure rag gossip trash," further claiming it "felt like" Finstad "could have co-written alongside Perez Hilton and posted to a blog."
