= Goodreads =

American social book cataloging website owned by Amazon

- Company type: Subsidiary
- Website type: Book reviews
- Available in: English
- Founded: December 2006; 19 years ago
- Owner: Amazon
- Founders: Otis Chandler; Elizabeth Khuri
- Website: www.goodreads.com
- Commercial: Yes
- Registration: Optional
- Current status: Active

Goodreads is an American social cataloging website operated by Goodreads, Inc., a subsidiary of Amazon. Users can search its database of books, annotations, quotes, and reviews and expand the database by registering books to generate library catalogs and reading lists. They can also create their own groups of book suggestions, surveys, polls, blogs, and discussions. The website's offices are located in San Francisco.

Goodreads was founded in December 2006 and launched in January 2007 by Otis Chandler and Elizabeth Khuri Chandler. In December 2007, the site had 650,000 members and 10 million books had been added. By July 2012, the site reported 10 million members, 20 million monthly visits, and 30 employees. On March 28, 2013, Amazon announced its acquisition of Goodreads, and by July 23, 2013, Goodreads announced its user base had grown to 20 million members.

By September 2023, the site had more than 150 million members.

== History ==
=== Founders ===
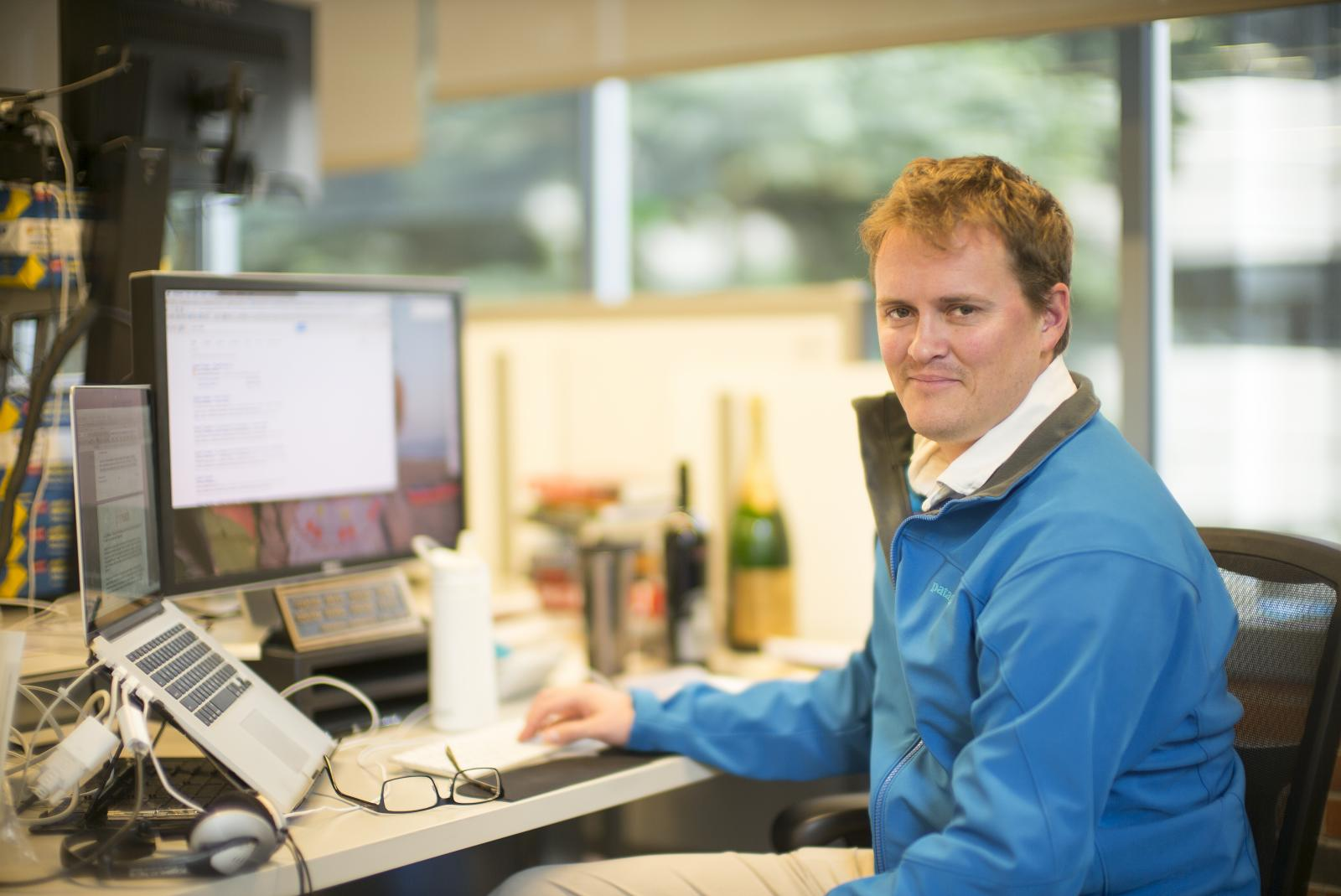
Otis Chandler

Goodreads founders Otis Chandler and Elizabeth Khuri Chandler first met while studying at Stanford (Engineering and English respectively). After university, Chandler initially worked as a programmer in online businesses, including dating sites, while Khuri Chandler worked as a journalist. Chandler and Khuri both grew up in California. Chandler is a descendant of the publisher of the Los Angeles Times, Otis Chandler.

=== Foundation and mission ===
Goodreads was founded in 2006. The idea came about when Otis Chandler was browsing through his friend's bookshelf. He wanted to recreate that browsing experience and create a space for people to review the books they read.

Goodreads aimed to address the “discoverability problem” in the digital age by providing a platform for readers to find, discuss, and share books, using user-generated reviews, recommendations, and community features to guide consumers toward titles they might enjoy.

=== Early years ===
Before gaining much traction, Otis and Elizabeth Chandler grew the platform through word of mouth, initially reaching 800 users. Eventually, it gained attention through the media such as Mashable During its first year of business, the company was run without any formal funding. In December 2007, the site received funding estimated at $750,000 from angel investors. This funding sustained Goodreads until 2009, when they received $2 million from True Ventures.

In October 2010, the company opened its application programming interface, which enabled developers to access its ratings and titles.

In 2011, Goodreads acquired Discovereads, a book recommendation engine that employs "machine learning algorithms to analyze which books people might like, based on books they've liked in the past and books that people with similar tastes have liked." After a user has rated 20 books on its five-star scale, the site will begin making recommendations. Otis Chandler believed this rating system would be superior to Amazon's, as Amazon's includes books a user has browsed or purchased as gifts when determining its recommendations. Later that year, Goodreads introduced an algorithm to suggest books to registered users and had over five million members. The New Yorker's Macy Halford noted that the algorithm was not perfect, as the number of books needed to create a perfect recommendation system is so large that "by the time I'd got halfway there, my reading preferences would have changed and I'd have to start over again."

As of 2012, membership was required to use but free. In October 2012, Goodreads announced it had grown to 11 million members with 395 million books cataloged and over 20,000 book clubs created by its users. A month later, in November 2012, Goodreads had surpassed 12 million members, with the member base having doubled in one year.

=== 2013 acquisition by Amazon ===
In March 2013, Amazon made an agreement to acquire Goodreads in the second quarter of 2013 for an undisclosed sum. Amazon had previously purchased the competitor Shelfari in 2008, with the Goodreads purchase "stunning" the book industry. The Authors Guild called it a "truly devastating act of vertical integration" and that Amazon's 'control of online bookselling approaches the insurmountable.' There were mixed reactions from Goodreads users, at the time totaling 16 million members. Goodreads founder Otis Chandler said that "his management team would remain in place to guard the reviewing process" with the acquisition. Chandler continued running Goodreads until 2019. The New York Times noted that Goodreads, at the time of the acquisition, had a more reputable reviewing system than Amazon's. The paper also said that: "Goodreads was a rival to Amazon as a place for discovering books" and that this deal "consolidates Amazon's power to determine which authors get exposure for their work".

=== Post acquisition ===
Noting that some authors had been "too aggressive in their self-promotion" (as Goodreads admitted in an email) and that some readers had responded with aggression, in September 2013, Goodreads announced it would delete, without warning, reviews that threatened authors or mentioned authors' behavior. As of April 2020, the site's guidelines still state that "reviews that are predominantly about an author's behavior and not about the book will be deleted."

In January 2016, Amazon announced that it would shut down Shelfari in favor of Goodreads, effective March 16, 2016. Users were offered the ability to export data and migrate accounts. In April 2016, Goodreads announced that over 50 million user reviews had been posted to the website.

In 2023, Jane Friedman discovered listings of six books, which she believed to have been written using AI generative models (LLM), fraudulently using her name, on Amazon and Goodreads. Amazon and Goodreads resisted removing the fraudulent titles until the author's complaints went viral on social media.

== Features ==
=== Book discovery ===
On the Goodreads website, users can add books to their personal bookshelves, rate and review books, see what their friends and authors are reading, participate in discussion boards and groups on a variety of topics, and get suggestions for future reading choices based on their reviews of previously read books. Once users have added friends to their profile, they will see their friends' shelves and reviews and can comment on friends' pages. Goodreads features a rating system of one to five stars, with the option of accompanying the rating with a written review. The site provides default bookshelves—read, currently-reading, to-read—and provides the opportunity to create customized shelves to categorize a user's books.

=== Reading challenges ===
A popular phenomenon on the site is the so-called reading challenge, where users commit to reading a certain number of books per year and track their progress through the platform. Recent research in literacy studies shows that such challenges encourage participants to read more in their free time.

=== Content access ===
Goodreads users can read or listen to a preview of a book on the website using Kindle Cloud Reader and Audible. Goodreads also offers quizzes and trivia, quotations, book lists, and free giveaways. Members can receive the regular newsletter featuring new books, suggestions, author interviews, and poetry. If a user has written a work, the work can be linked on the author's profile page, which also includes an author's blog. Goodreads organizes offline opportunities as well, such as in-person book exchanges and "literary pub crawls".

=== End-of-year reading review ===
Goodreads offers a "My Year in Books" report in which a user can review their reading history from the prior year. The Goodreads tradition, created by Fionnuala Lirsdottir in 2014, encourages users to reflect on their past reading, by offering statistic of the number of pages read; the number of books read; the user's average book length and their average ratings.

=== User interaction ===
The website facilitates reader interactions with authors through the interviews, giveaways, authors' blogs, and profile information. There is also a special section for authors with suggestions for promoting their works on Goodreads.com, aimed at helping them reach their target audience. By 2011, "seventeen thousand authors, including James Patterson and Margaret Atwood" used Goodreads to advertise.

Users can add each other as "friends", enabling them to share reviews, posts, book recommendations, and messages.

Goodreads has a presence on Facebook, Pinterest, Twitter, and other social networking sites. Linking a Goodreads account with a social networking account like Facebook enables the ability to import contacts from the social networking account to Goodreads, expanding one's Goodreads "Friends" list. There are settings available, as well, to allow Goodreads to post straight to a social networking account, which informs, e.g., Facebook friends, what one is reading or how one rated a book.

The Amazon Kindle Paperwhite (version 2) and Kindle Voyage feature integration with Goodreads' social network via a user interface button.

== Catalog data ==
Book catalog data was seeded with large imports from various closed and open data sources, including individual publishers, Ingram, Amazon (before 2012 and after 2013), WorldCat and the Library of Congress.

Goodreads librarians improve book information on the website, including editing book and author information and adding cover images. Goodreads members can apply to become volunteer librarians after they have 50 books on their profile. Goodreads librarians coordinate on the Goodreads Librarian Group.

User data becomes proprietary to Goodreads though available via an application programming interface, or API, unlike similar projects like The Open Library which publish the catalog and user edits as open data. In December 2020, Goodreads deactivated API keys more than 30 days old and said it would no longer be issuing new API keys.

=== Metadata source change ===
In January 2012, Goodreads switched from using Amazon's public Product Advertising API for book metadata (such as title, author, and number of pages) to book wholesaler Ingram. Goodreads felt Amazon's requirements for using its API were too restrictive, and the combination of Ingram, the Library of Congress, and other sources would be more flexible. Some users worried that their reading records would be lost, but Goodreads had a number of plans in place to ease the transition and ensure that no data was lost, even for titles that might be in danger of deletion because they were available only through Amazon, such as Kindle editions and self-published works on Amazon.

In May 2013, as a result of Goodreads' acquisition by Amazon, Goodreads began using Amazon's data again.

== Competition and review fairness ==
In 2012, after receiving a poor review on her novel The Selection, author Kiera Cass encouraged her Twitter followers to "knock [the review] off" the front page of Goodreads' section on the book. This sparked public outrage and started a discussion on the relationship between authors and reviewers on Goodreads. That same year, Goodreads received criticism from users about the availability and tone of reviews posted on the site, with some users and websites stating that certain reviewers were harassing and encouraging attacks on authors. Goodreads publicly posted its review guidelines in August 2012 to address these issues. After Amazon's acquisition of Goodreads, this policy was modified to include deletion of any review containing "an ad hominem attack or an off-topic comment".

== Goodreads Choice Awards ==
The Goodreads Choice Awards is a yearly award program, first launched on Goodreads in 2009.

Winners are determined by users voting on books that Goodreads has nominated or books of their choosing, released in the given year. Most books that Goodreads nominates are from verified Goodreads authors. The final voting round collects the top 10 books from 20 different categories.

== Criticism ==
Critics have assailed Goodreads' lack of development and maintenance, coupled with its dominant position in the book-review marketplace. For example, Goodreads' recommendation algorithm was increasingly seen as primitive. The StoryGraph was established in 2019 as a competitor to Goodreads.

=== Review bombing ===
Goodreads' review system is more easily "gamed" than other online book-review platforms, although Goodreads remains by far the most popular website for book reviews. While Amazon does not allow reviews to be posted for most books that have not yet been released, any registered user on Goodreads may rate or review a book before publication. Goodreads has also been criticized for lax content moderation. The moderation system is manual and faces a backlog of flagged reviews.

Manipulative reviews ("review bombing") have been posted, with novels flooded with negative (one-star) reviews, sometimes even before publication. Such "weaponized" reviews have been described as a form of cyberbullying and targeted harassment of authors. Author Gretchen Felker-Martin's debut horror novel, about a trans woman, was review-bombed in what she suspected to be an organized campaign. Young adult fiction authors Keira Drake and Amélie Wen Zhao delayed publication of their fantasy novels after facing a tsunami of criticism on Twitter and Goodreads from users who deemed their fantasy universes to be racially insensitive. Elizabeth Gilbert, the author of Eat, Pray, Love, was flooded with negative ratings on Goodreads for her not-yet-published novel The Snow Forest from users who objected to its setting in 1930s Russia. Cecilia Rabess, a Black author, was flooded with negative reviews on Goodreads for her debut novel Everything's Fine, which focuses on a young Black woman who falls in love with a bigoted white fellow employee at Goldman Sachs; the negative reviewers had not read the work, yet deemed its premise to be racist. Some scammers and cyberstalkers have used "review bombing" threats as part of extortion campaigns, threatening to flood a work with poor reviews unless an author pays.

Goodreads said in 2021 that it takes "swift action to remove users when we determine that they violate our guidelines" and were developing technology to "prevent bad actor behavior and inauthentic reviews in order to better safeguard our community." However, authors have criticized the website's lax moderation; fantasy novelist Rin Chupeco has noted that authors from marginalized groups are often a target, saying that Goodreads only enforces its rules against reviews that specifically target "the authors with big enough marketing and publicity teams to demand these removals."

=== ‌Restrictions in Iran ===
Access to Goodreads has faced intermittent restrictions for Iranian users, imposed both by the Iranian government and by Goodreads’ parent company, Amazon.

==== Blocking in Iran ====
In February 2010, traffic from Iranian users to Goodreads dropped sharply. This occurred during a broader wave of internet censorship in Iran, including the temporary blocking of Gmail. At the time, Goodreads confirmed that over 114,000 Iranian members had collectively added more than 714,000 books to their digital bookshelves. The platform praised Iranian users for engaging in literary and political discussions, and condemned the filtering as an attack on freedom of expression.

==== Account suspensions and closure ====
In June 2019, shortly after the reimposition of U.S. sanctions against Iran, several Iranian users reported that their Goodreads accounts had been suspended. Emails sent by Goodreads cited "government sanctions and export control regulations" as the reason for the action.

Writers, translators, and cultural users — including Iranian authors Arash Azizi and Barbad Golshiri — condemned the move as a form of cultural censorship, inconsistent with principles of information freedom. The suspensions drew significant attention on social media. Notably, Goodreads does not offer financial or commercial services, and Iranian users were primarily using it to review books and organize their reading.

The platform's 2010 statement, in which it had criticized Iran for blocking access and declared that "books make no harm", was widely referenced in these discussions.

In late June 2025, Goodreads initiated a new wave of account removals targeting Iranian users without prior warning. In order to restore access, Goodreads requested documents such as a passport, proof of residence, and employment verification. In response, Iranian users launched a public campaign to protest this action.

== See also ==
- aNobii
- Babelio
- BookArmy
- Bookish
- douban
- iDreamBooks
- LibraryThing
- Open Library
- Readgeek
- Shelfari
- The StoryGraph
- Library 2.0 the concept behind Goodreads and similar sites
- The Hawaii Project – Personalized book discovery engine

== Bibliography ==
- Keegan, Victor Keegan (June 21, 2007). "It's a new online chapter for books". The Guardian.
- Méndez, Teresa (June 15, 2007). "Peer-to-peer book reviews fill a niche". The Christian Science Monitor.
- Roy, Nilanjana S. (September 27, 2007). "The world's largest reading room". Business Standard. Archived from the original on October 21, 2007. (archived)
- Sharick, Catherine (December 11, 2007). "Top 10 Websites of 2007". Time. Archived from the original on December 12, 2007.
