= Suzanne Finstad =

American writer and lawyer

- Born: Suzanne Elaine Finstad; September 14, 1955 (age 70); Minneapolis, Minnesota, United States
- Occupations: Author; biographer; journalist; producer; lawyer
- Years active: 1977–present

Suzanne Finstad (born Suzanne Elaine Finstad September 14, 1955, in Minneapolis, Minnesota) is a bestselling American author, biographer, journalist, producer, and lawyer.

== Work pre-1990 ==
Finstad received the Frank Wardlaw Prize in 1984 for literary excellence for her first book, Heir Not Apparent (1984), drawn from her experiences as a young law clerk and trial attorney investigating claims to the billion-dollar estate of industrialist, aviator and filmmaker Howard Hughes, who appeared to have died without a valid will. American Cinematographer described Heir Not Apparent as a "spellbinding account of intrigues by lawyers, relatives and fortune hunters for a share in the Hughes estate." Kirkus Reviews praised the book, which was excerpted in Penthouse, as "immediate and engrossing". Other critics called it "strikingly literate", "a detective-story lovers dream . . . the stuff good novels are made of."

Her second book, Ulterior Motives: The Killing and Dark Legacy of Tycoon Henry Kyle (1987), took her into the genre of the non-fiction true crime novel created by Truman Capote's In Cold Blood, centering on a spectacular murder trial which revealed that self-made millionaire Kyle, shot by his older son, had a violent Jekyll-Hyde personality and a lifetime of secrets, including a hidden wife and daughter. Ulterior Motives, which began as a Rolling Stone assignment into Kyle's mysterious murder in his rundown Sunset Boulevard mansion, presents a true tale of "money, greed, family discord, drugs and a bigger-than-life cast of characters," according to the Houston Post. "She handles the story deftly and sensitively", wrote the book critic for the Dallas Morning News, "with touches of irony and humor."

== Work since 1990 ==
Finstad wrote the national bestseller Sleeping with the Devil (1991), a non-fiction novel about the murder-for-hire of Barbra Piotrowski, a California beauty queen in a destructive love triangle with a married Texas health club tycoon named Richard Minns, who was alleged to have hired the assassins who shot and paralyzed Piotrowski. The book was excerpted in Cosmopolitan and published in France, Italy, and Germany. One critic called Sleeping With the Devil "a true American tragedy". Others described it as "hypnotic," ". . . a disquieting book about adultery, scams, misuse of power and attempted murder . . . a must-read." The paperback includes details about Minns' arrest for felony passport fraud, assisted by information provided by Finstad, who, reported the Dallas Morning News,"fearlessly dug into the story about the brilliant, complex man who has stayed beyond the reach of the courts and the Houston police." Sleeping With the Devil was made into a movie for CBS that aired in 1997. Finstad was an Associate Producer.

In 1988, Finstad wrote a cover story on Queen Noor of Jordan, the American who married King Hussein after graduating from Princeton's first class to admit women ("The Incredible Odyssey of Lisa Halaby"). It led to a contract for Finstad to write a biography of Queen Noor for Villard Books after the Gulf War. Finstad made numerous trips to the Middle East and elsewhere for her research. The manuscript was set aside for political reasons. CBS later optioned the magazine piece.

Finstad spent the next three years researching and writing Child Bride: The Untold Story of Priscilla Beaulieu Presley (1997), the first biography of Priscilla Presley. Finstad offered a detailed account of Priscilla Beaulieu's childhood, including Priscilla's discovery of her true father at eleven, her courtship by Elvis Presley when she was 14 years old, their marriage, and her management of Elvis Presley Enterprises after their divorce and his death. Child Bride was alleged based on extensive interviews with Priscilla Presley, her family, her close friends, her classmates, her co-stars and numerous members of Presley's circle in Memphis and Germany, including Currie Grant, a former Army buddy of Elvis, who introduced Priscilla to Elvis. Harmony/Crown published Child Bride in 1997; Century London published the book in the U.K. However, the book's credibility is questionable, with some even noting how Finstad's support of Grant's account of events was controversial. While Child Bride was on several cities' bestseller lists, Priscilla filed a lawsuit against Currie Grant, denying his claim that she had sex with him in exchange for introducing her to Elvis Presley. Entertainment Weekly alleged in a 1997 review that the book's claims were "backed by interviews with scores of sources." However, this view about great use of various sources for the book's content was later disputed, with Grant's account later determined to have been, as The Chicago Tribune noted in August 1998, "used as the source for the book “Child Bride: The Untold Story of Priscilla Beaulieu Presley” by Suzanne Finstad." In the book, Finstad included excerpts from her taped joint interview with Grant and Priscilla Presley, who disagreed with certain points that Finstad had independently documented. Priscilla's suit resulted in a default judgment against Grant, whom Priscilla had sued for at least $10 million, on August 19, 1998. He was ordered to pay $75,000. In addition, the ruling, which was made by Los Angeles Superior Court Judge Daniel A. Curry, also found that Grant had not only made false statements which were repeated, but that these statements had also been used as "the source" for Child Bride. However, neither Finstad nor her publisher was a party to the lawsuit, and Finstad and her publisher say they stand by their account of the affair in the book.

Crown re-released Child Bride in 2005. "Finstad's research and her analysis of Priscilla's complex character make for a riveting read," Liz Smith wrote in the New York Post.".

At least one reviewer for The StoryGraph referred to Child Bride as "idiotic" and "pure rag gossip trash," further claiming it "felt like" Finstad "could have co-written alongside Perez Hilton and posted to a blog."

== Work since 2000 ==
In 2001, Finstad wrote the New York Times bestseller Natasha: The Biography of Natalie Wood, published by Harmony/Crown and released in the UK by Century London. Natasha was named the Best Film Book of 2001 by the San Francisco Chronicle and it was also named one of the Top 10 Books of 2001 by the Economist. Natasha, excerpted in People, was hailed as "the definitive Natalie Wood" by Premiere Magazine. The Chicago Tribune called it "an insightful, haunting page-turner of a book;", "remarkably researched," stated the Baltimore Sun, ". . . certain things stay with you." "The information Finstad has discovered about Wood's horrific childhood, her anxiety-ridden stardom, and her mysterious death is deeply disturbing," noted Variety. "Heartstopping," proclaimed the Toronto National Post. "...a life entangled in mystical oddities, described with academic flair...the climax -- death by drowning -- is reached with a Chekhovian inevitability."

The film rights to Natasha were purchased by ABC in 2001 before the galleys were released. Peter Bogdanovich directed the adaptation, which aired on ABC as a three-hour movie and was shown as a four-hour miniseries in Australia. Finstad was Co-Executive Producer. The New York Times review of Finstad's book called Natasha "a sad, penetrating portrait that juxtaposes the storybook myth . . . and the real story of what happened once the cameras stopped rolling.". In his review for the Washington Post Book World, Jonathan Yardley observed, "Finstad has a keen sense of how that city's dream factory simultaneously turns women into stars and leaves them bereft."

Finstad's editor at Harmony/Crown suggested that she follow Natasha with a biography of actor-producer-writer-director Warren Beatty. The result was Warren Beatty: A Private Man, published in the US in 2005 by Harmony/Crown and published by Aurum in London. It was chosen as one of the Top Five Entertainment Books of 2005 by The Sunday Times (London), which described it as a "seductive study of a perfectionist and overachiever," "well-researched and absorbing . . . undoubtedly the best star biography of the year.". USA Today called it "[a] compelling biography;" another reviewer described it as "an engrossing account of a complex individual ... periodically referring to the parallel lives of the brother-sister duo of Beatty and Shirley MacLaine. The impact made on their astonishing lives by a Baptist Virginia background along with their upbringing by an emotionless father (who blamed marriage for his lack of success) and a Canadian drama-teacher mother is ... fascinating." "Award-winning biographer Suzanne Finstad doesn't shy away from Beatty's womanizing ways," wrote the critic Allan Hunter. "She does, however, realize that they are only part of a much bigger picture ... Finstad builds a very substantial portrait of what makes Beatty tick."

== Film adaptations ==
Sleeping With the Devil and Natasha: The Biography of Natalie Wood were adapted for television.
