= Clare Pooley =

British novelist, speaker, and blogger

- Education: Roedean School; Newnham College, Cambridge
- Occupations: Novelist; Memoirist; Blogger; Speaker
- Writing career
- Pen name: SoberMummy
- Years active: 2015–present
- Genres: Contemporary fiction; Memoir
- Notable works: The Sober Diaries; The Authenticity Project; The People on Platform 5; How to Age Disgracefully
- Website: clarepooley.com

Clare Pooley is a British novelist, memoirist, speaker, and blogger.

Her debut novel, The Authenticity Project (2020), was a New York Times bestseller, a BBC Radio 2 Book Club pick, and the winner of the 2021 Romantic Novelists' Association Debut Romantic Novel Award.

Her later books include The People on Platform 5 (2022), published in North America as Iona Iverson's Rules for Commuting, and How to Age Disgracefully (2024).

== Origins and education ==
Pooley was educated at Roedean School and Newnham College, Cambridge, from which she graduated with a degree in economics.

== Career ==
Pooley first pursued a career in advertising at J. Walter Thompson, in due course becoming a Managing Partner and Group Head, before leaving the work-place on the birth of her third child.

In 2015, Pooley began a blog, Mummy was a Secret Drinker, about her life following a resolution to give up alcohol. She blogged under a pseudonym until the announcement of her first book deal in September 2017.

Pooley's first book, The Sober Diaries, was a narrative of her first year of sobriety and also included an account of her experience of breast cancer.

In October 2018, it was announced that Pooley's fictional debut, The Authenticity Project, had been the subject of a six-way auction, with Transworld securing UK and Commonwealth rights, Penguin Random House acquiring the US rights, and foreign rights sold in 29 other languages.

The Authenticity Project, published in 2020, was a New York Times Bestseller, and the winner of the RNA debut novel award. It was also awarded best novel in translation in the French Babelio awards, the Prix Babelio.

Pooley's second novel, titled The People on Platform 5 in the UK, and Iona Iverson's Rules for Commuting in the US, was published in 2022, and her third – How to Age Disgracefully – in spring 2024.

== List of published works ==
- The Sober Diaries: how one woman stopped drinking and started living. Coronet Books: 2018 ISBN 1-4736-6190-0
- The Authenticity Project. Bantam Press: 2020 ISBN 978-1787631793
- The People on Platform 5. Bantam Press: 2022 ISBN 9781787631816 (USA title: Iona Iverson's Rules for Commuting)
- How to age disgracefully. Bantam Press: 2024 ISBN 9781787637153
