= The Hawaii Project =

Personalized book discovery engine

- Company type: Private
- Website type: Book Recommendations
- Headquarters: Sudbury, Massachusetts, Kailua, Honolulu County, Hawaii, {{{location_country}}}
- Area served: International
- Key people: Mark Watkins, founder
- Industry: Books
- Services: Book Recommendations
- Website: www.thehawaiiproject.com
- Registration: Not required
- Launched: June 9, 2015; 11 years ago

The Hawaii Project is a personalized book recommendation engine. The Hawaii Project provides personalized book recommendations and access to current book news. It tracks curated sources about books, such as award lists, articles, and blogs, to find new books that a user might be interested in. The Hawaii Project was nominated for the 2017 Bookseller's Book Tech Company of the Year.

== History ==
The Hawaii Project was founded by Mark Watkins. Prior to The Hawaii Project, he was CEO and co-founder of Goby, a mobile recommendation engine for finding things to do, acquired by Telenav in 2011. Prior to that, he worked for Endeca, a search company acquired by Oracle in 2011.

The origin of the company was rooted in the founder's frustration at not finding out about new books from his favorite authors.

== See also ==
- Goodreads
- LibraryThing
