= BookArmy =

Closed HarperCollins book recommendation website

BookArmy was a social networking website and book recommendation tool for readers, owned by HarperCollins. BookArmy was launched in February 2009, and closed in December 2010.

After being in private beta for some months the site went live in February 2009, though remained in its beta phase. BookArmy was owned by HarperCollins UK and Fleming Media. BookArmy carried every English language book with an ISBN, and featured pages for around six million books and authors. Site users could discuss and review titles, record their own personal book collection and create reading lists. All data was collected from Nielsen.

On 25 March 2009, BookArmy launched its video channel. BookArmy closed on 21 December 2010 citing "strong competition from similar sites and fewer advertising opportunities".

== See also ==
- aNobii
- Douban
- Goodreads
- LibraryThing
- Shelfari
