= The Elite (novel) =

2013 novel by Kiera Cass

- First edition
- Author: Kiera Cass
- Language: English
- Series: The Selection
- Genre: [Dystopia, Romance, Young Adult]
- Published: 23 April 2013
- Publisher: HarperTeen
- Publication place: United States
- Pages: 355
- ISBN: 978-0-06-205996-3
- Preceded by: The Selection
- Followed by: The One

The Elite is the second novel in the Selection series by Kiera Cass. It is narrated by America Singer, a 17-year-old girl who is selected to compete with 35 other girls to become Prince Maxon's wife and become queen. The Elite tells the story at the stage in the competition where there are only six girls left and tensions are high from both the competition and the dangerous rebels.

== Plot ==
The book takes place 300 years in the future in a country called Illéa (formerly the United States) that has a strict caste system. The castes range from eight to one, with Eights being the homeless and Ones being the royal family. Prince Maxon has narrowed down his selection candidates to an Elite of six girls: America, Kriss, Celeste, Elise, Natalie, and Marlee. Maxon must find a wife among these girls. In order to do so, Maxon meets their families and throws a Halloween Ball, at America's suggestion. At the ball, Maxon and America dance, and he tells her that he will propose to her after the Selection at the right time so that it is easy for her to say yes. America feels sure about marrying Maxon.

After the ball, it is discovered that Marlee has been having a secret affair with one of the guards, and as a consequence, is severely caned. The episode results in her becoming an Eight. Upset and angry that Maxon would let such a thing happen to Marlee, America reconsiders her feelings for Maxon. Then, the girls must plan an event and are split into two teams: America and Kriss, and Natalie, Celeste, and Elise. After much planning, America and Kriss's reception with the Italian Royalty is successful. Celeste shows America an article that shows that she is now the least favorite, and Celeste is the highest. After this, Maxon asks to speak with America. He shows her the Princess's suite and reveals her best friend, Marlee whom he had hidden without the king's knowledge. The two girls talk about Marlee's new life, where she cooks in the kitchen and has married Carter Woodwork, the former guard.

Maxon and King Clarkson go to New Asia and plan to stay at Elise's parents' house. The palace ends up losing connection with the king and Maxon. They return. America is later crushed when she sees Maxon kissing a half-naked Celeste in the hallway. She later angrily confronts him, asking to leave. However, he rejects her request. For their next project, the girls must give a presentation that will be broadcast on The Report. America, after reading the secret diaries of Gregory Illéa, the first king, presents the idea that the castes should be eliminated. She attempts to answer questions by showing the diary. Immediately, the outraged king shuts down the report, takes the diary from her, and demands she returns home. However, Maxon insists she stays, leaving his father infuriated.

The Southern Rebels then attack the palace, and America runs into Maxon leaving the hospital wing on her way to the gardens. He is acting weird and seems to be in pain. They get locked in a safe room and Maxon is forced to tell America that his father had whipped him after America's stunt on The Report and she cleans him up. She asks Maxon what the other scars are for, and he says they were for things he had said, done, or known. He reveals that it has been happening for a while. They talk about their feelings and Maxon explains his interactions with Celeste and him becoming close to Kriss. They kiss and imply that they love each other. Once America thinks she is going home, she realizes how much Maxon means to her and that she is going to fight for him and his love once he convinces his father to give her one last chance to behave.

== Characters ==
- America Singer – The protagonist and narrator of the novel. She is a member of the Elite.
- Maxon Schreave – Prince of Illéa, he must eventually decide which of the Elite to select as a wife. He enjoys photography.
- Aspen Leger – A palace guard and America's ex-boyfriend. He has dark hair and was formerly a Six.
- Marlee Tames – A member of the Elite and best friend of America, she harbors a secret. She is described as blonde and bubbly by America.
- Kriss Ambers – A member of the Elite and is a Three. America remarks that Kriss has grown closer to Maxon throughout the course of the book.
- Elise Whisks – A member of the Elite who has family connections to New Asia, a country that Illéa is at war with.
- Natalie Luca – A member of the Elite who deals with a family tragedy. She is viewed by America as someone who has her head in the clouds.
- Celeste Newsome – A member of the Elite, she is a Two and worked as a model. Celeste and America do not get along and are often in conflict.
- Clarkson Schreave – King of Illéa and Maxon's father, he is often seen as strict. The girls react with fear when he gets angry. America dislikes him.
- Amberly Schreave – Queen of Illéa and Maxon's mother. She is from the south and was a Four until she married King Clarkson at the end of his Selection. She is described as kind by America and mentors the selected girls.
- Carter Woodwork – A palace guard.

== Promotion ==
Cass went on The Dark Days Of Summer Tour in 2013 to promote the book. She also released teasers and spoilers through her publisher HarperTeen in preparation for the release.

== Reception ==
The book received mixed critical reviews. Kirkus Reviews called it "vapid", but they also described the book as a "fast read." The Elite has an editor ranking of 4.5 out of 5 stars on YA Books Central. The book was reviewed favorably by some consumers with a user rating on YA Books Central of 4.1 out of 5 stars. The book was well received commercially. The week of May 12, 2013 it was number one on The New York Times Best Sellers List for the Young Adult Category. The novel also performed well in ibook sales ranking at 9 in the Children's and Teen Category the week of May 25, 2014. As of May 11, 2014 The Elite, together with The Selection, has sold over 800,000 copies. Also, 26 territories have the rights to the series.
