= Anobii =

Social network

- Website type: Catalog and community
- Owner: Ovolab
- Creator: Greg Sung
- Website: www.anobii.com
- Commercial: Yes
- Registration: Free
- Launched: 2006
- Current status: active

Anobii (stylized, anobii) is a social networking site aimed at readers. Its website was launched in April 2006 by Greg Sung. It was acquired by the publisher Mondadori in 2014 from a venture backed by HMV, HarperCollins, Penguin, and Random House.

The service allows individuals to catalog their books and rate, review and discusses them with other readers. The service is available via the Anobii website and iOS and Android apps. The apps allow individuals to barcode scan books and read both community and expert reviews.

Anobii has readers in over 20 countries but is most popular in Italy.

On 2 March 2011 it was announced that in 2010 Anobii had been acquired by a UK startup led by HMV and supported by HarperCollins, Penguin, and The Random House Group and that the company is working on a new version of the website with the possibility to buy books and most of all ebooks.

On 12 June 2012, it was announced that HMV had sold its interest to UK supermarket company Sainsbury's for £1.

In January 2013, it was announced that beta.anobii.com will be known as eBooks by Sainsbury's from 20 February 2013. Anobii.com will continue to exist as a social network for book lovers.

In January 2014, Anobii Ltd was sold to the Italian publisher Arnoldo Mondadori Editore.

On 29 May 2019, Anobii Ltd was sold to the Italian mobile apps and software developer, Ovolab.

The word "Anobii" comes from Anobium Punctatum, the Latin name for the most common bookworm.

== See also ==
- Babelio
- BookArmy
- Bookish
- Booklog
- Douban
- Goodreads
- LibraryThing
- Shelfari
- Librarish
