= IDreamBooks =

Book review aggregator Web site

iDreamBooks
- Website type: Book review aggregator
- Website: idreambooks.com
- Commercial: Yes
- Registration: Optional
- Launched: July 2012

iDreamBooks.com was a book "discoverability" website, structured as a book review aggregator.

The site was inspired by the film review aggregator website Rotten Tomatoes. Similarly to the Rotten Tomatoes system, iDreamBooks.com assigns two percentage scores to each title: one is based on professional reviews from reputable publications (including, among many others, The New Yorker, The Guardian, The Wall Street Journal, The New York Review of Books, The Independent, The Millions, The Sydney Morning Herald, etc.) as well as from writers who were vetted by the website and allowed to submit reviews; the other score is obtained from consumer user ratings.

Books from publishers such as (Hachette, HarperCollins, Macmillan, Penguin, Random House, and Simon & Schuster) were included. The website also partnered with Sony Reader.

== See also ==
- Goodreads
- Rotten Tomatoes
- Review aggregator
