= Henri Lœvenbruck =

French writer, singer and composer (born 1972)

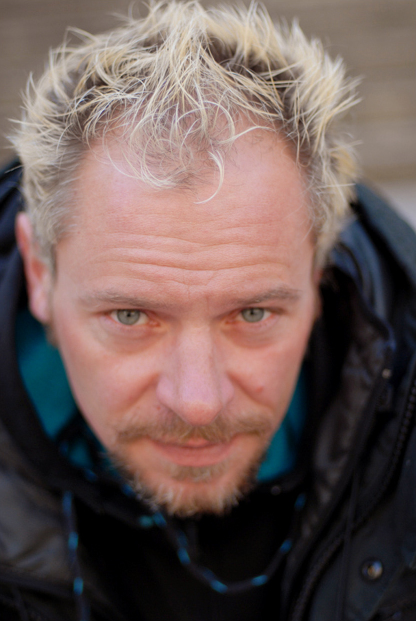
- Henri Lœvenbruck at Quais du Polar in March 2010.
- Born: March 21, 1972 (age 54); Paris, France
- Occupations: Writer, singer, composer
- Writing career
- Language: French

Henri Lœvenbruck (born 21 March 1972) is a French writer, singer and composer. An author of thrillers, adventures and fantasy, his work is translated in more than fifteen languages. As a singer-songwriter, he writes songs for himself and other French artists.

== Biography ==
He is of Austrian and German origin.

After a childhood shared between the 11th arrondissement of Paris and the England, Henri Lœvenbruck passed a khâgne (second year of preparatory course for arts section of the ENS school) at the Lycée Chaptal in Paris. He passed a master's degree in English at the Sorbonne, then he embarked on journalism and music. He published his first novel in 1998 at éditions Baleine, as Philippe Machine, his pen name. 300,000 copies of his trilogy La Moïra (published between 2001 and 2003) are sold including all editions. It was translated in more than twelve languages. Next, he began to write thrillers with the Flammarion editor where he met again success, especially with the Ari Mackenzie serie, in which an awful small duck from the French secret service, allows him to condemn drifts done by big NGO in Africa.

In the 1990s, Henri Lœvenbruck sang and played Hammond organ into various parisian rock groups. At the beginning of 2008, after having written songs for other artists (such as Kelks), he decided to return on the stage to show a dozen of protest songs. In 2009, he participated, as a translator and chorister, at the album Molly Malone – Balade irlandaise from his friend Renaud. In 2009, he recorded a mini LP, with Vincent-Marie Bouvot. From 2013 to 2015, he joined the rock group Freelers, which makes numerous concerts in French festivals, and in which he plays keyboard Hammond organ.

He is a member of the artist community La Ligue de l'Imaginaire.

In July 2011, he was named Chevalier de l'Ordre des Arts et des Lettres.

== Work ==
=== Serie Serum ===
This series was cowritten with Fabrice Mazza and is compounded of a first season made of 6 episodes published at J'ai lu editions in 2012.

- Season 1 episode 1 (in French). Paris: J'ai lu. March 28, 2012. p. 192. ISBN 978-2290041741.
- Season 1 episode 2 (in French). Paris: J'ai lu. April 25, 2012. p. 192. ISBN 978-2290041734.
- Season 1 episode 3 (in French). Paris: J'ai lu. June 27, 2012. p. 196. ISBN 978-2290041727.
- Season 1 episode 4 (in French). Paris: J'ai lu. September 26, 2012. p. 215. ISBN 978-2290041710.
- Season 1 episode 5 (in French). Paris: J'ai lu. October 19, 2012. p. 192. ISBN 978-2290041703.
- Season 1 episode 6 (in French). Paris: J'ai lu. December 5, 2012. p. 221. ISBN 978-2290041697.

=== Cycle Ari Mackenzie ===
1. Le Rasoir d'Ockham. Flammarion. 2008. ISBN 978-2-0812-0865-0.
2. Les Cathédrales du Vide. Flammarion. September 2009. ISBN 978-2081221680.
3. Le Mystère Fulcanelli. Flammarion. October 2013. ISBN 978-2081246294.

=== Series La Moïra ===
1. La Louve et l'Enfant. Bragelonne. December 22, 2010. ISBN 978-2-914370-03-5.
2. La Guerre des loups. Bragelonne. ISBN 2-914370-09-1.
3. La Nuit de la louve. Bragelonne. ISBN 2-914370-23-7.

=== Gallica ===
1. Le Louvetier. Bragelonne. January 15, 2004. ISBN 2-914370-65-2.
2. La Voix des Brumes. Bragelonne. ISBN 2-914370-85-7.
3. Les Enfants de la Veuve. Bragelonne. ISBN 2-915549-15-X.

=== Series Le Testament des siècles ===
1. Lœvenbruck, Henri; Pacurariu, Christi (October 2007). Melencolia (comics). Christi Pacurariu. Soleil. ISBN 978-2-849469-43-9.
  comics
2. Lœvenbruck, Henri; Pacurariu, Christi (October 2009). La Pierre de Iorden (comics). Nicolas Jarry. Soleil. ISBN 9782302006409.
  comics

=== Independent novels ===
- Le Testament des siècles (in French). Flammarion. 2003. ISBN 2-08-068481-7.
- Le Syndrome Copernic (in French). Flammarion. 2007. ISBN 978-2080690876.
- L'Apothicaire (in French). Flammarion. 2011. p. 604. ISBN 978-2081233270.
- Nous rêvions juste de liberté (in French). Flammarion. April 1, 2015. p. 422. ISBN 978-2081307285.

=== Others ===
- Les Post-humains ((Macno serie), under the pen name of Philippe Machine). Baleine. ISBN 2-84219-182-X.
- La dame à la Forêt (Novella which is inserted between La Moïra and la Gallica, only in audio CD.). November 2004.
  Novella which is inserted between La Moïra and la Gallica, only in audio CD.
- Au seuil des ténèbres. J'ai Lu. June 2005. ISBN 2-290-32535-X.Translation by Henri Loevenbruck and Delphine Loevenbruck of this American anthology, published in the US and entitled The Best of Cemetery Dance
  Translation by Henri Loevenbruck and Delphine Loevenbruck of this American anthology, published in the US and entitled The Best of Cemetery Dance
- Weepers Circus, N'importe où, hors du monde (2011). It is a record and book for which about forty persons have participated (as authors or as singer) : Henri Lœvenbruck made there a previously unseen novella about his own reading of this enygmatic title "N'importe où, hors du monde", that is to say "Anywhere, outside the world".
