= Virginie Grimaldi =

French novelist (born 1977)

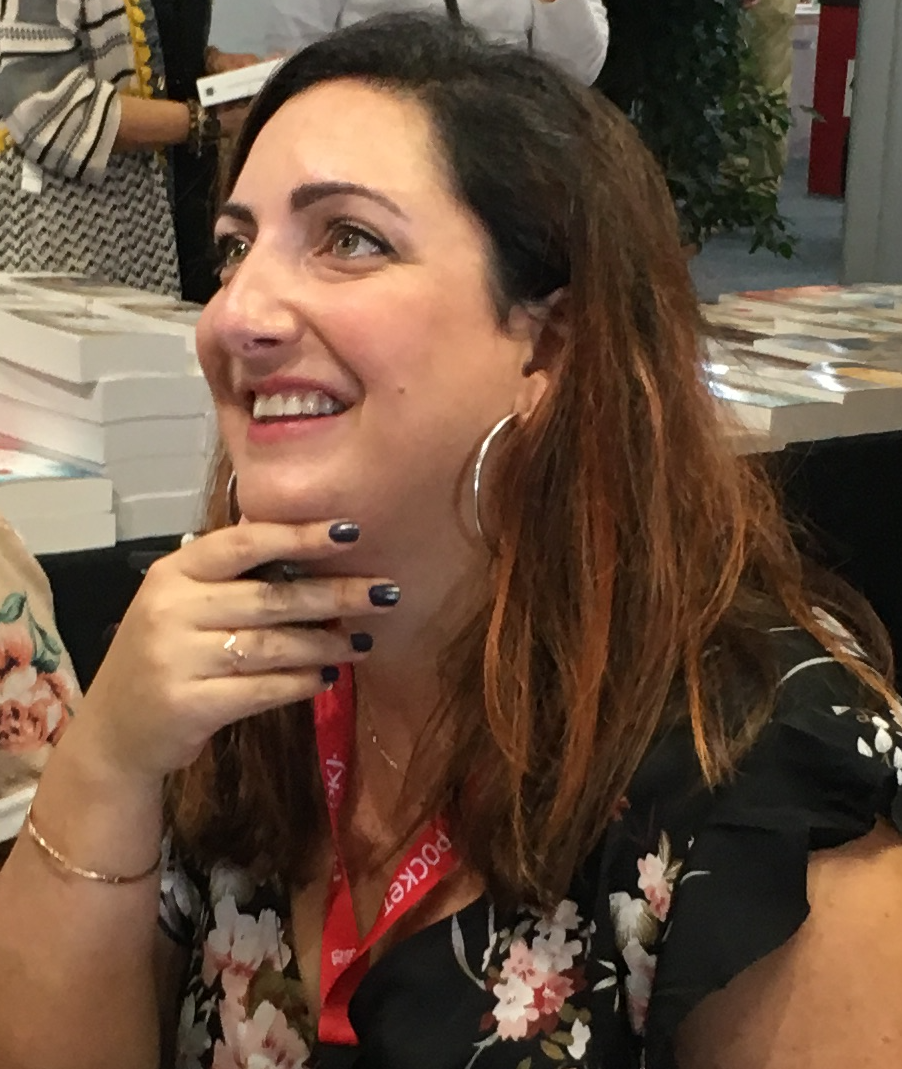
- Virginie Grimaldi at the salon Lire en Poche 2018
- Born: 1977 (age 48–49); Bordeaux (Gironde)
- Other name: Ginie
- Occupation: writer
- Writing career
- Language: French
- Genres: Novel; Chick lit "Feel-good" Literature
- Notable works: Le premier jour du reste de ma vie (2015); Tu comprendras quand tu seras plus grande (2016); Le parfum du bonheur est plus fort sous la pluie (2017); Il est grand temps de rallumer les étoiles (2018); Quand nos souvenirs viendront danser (2019); Et que ne durent que les moments doux (2020)
- Notable awards: 2e prix "E-crire Aufeminin"

Virginie Grimaldi (born 1977) is a French novelist. She published her first novel Le premier jour du reste de ma vie in 2015 and followed this with Tu comprendras quand tu seras plus grande (2016), Le parfum du bonheur est plus fort sous la pluie (2017), Il est grand temps de rallumer les étoiles (2018), Quand nos souvenirs viendront danser (2019), Et que ne durent que les moments doux (2020). Her six novels all became bestsellers. Many of her works – notably the first ones – had been analysed by some media as being close to chick lit and "feel-good" literature. In 2020 she reached second place on the Le Figaro/GfK Top 10 of French novelists selling the most books in France.

== Debuts ==
Virginie Grimaldi was born in 1977, near Bordeaux (Gironde). The desire to write came to her when reading her grandmother's poetry notebook, and she wrote the first draft of a novel when she was eight years old.

In 2009, she created the blog Femme Sweet Femme where she wrote humorous notes under the pseudonym "Ginie". This blog grew in popularity and allowed her to start writing her first novel. She closed down the blog in 2018.

In 2014, she received the second prize "E-crire Aufeminin", sponsored by Tatiana de Rosnay, for her short-story titled La peinture sur la bouche.

== Career ==
Grimaldi published her very first book in 2015. The novel Le premier jour du reste de ma vie (City Edition) tells the story of Marie, an unhappy woman who decided to leave her husband and go on a three-month cruise to find happiness. The magazine Biba regarded it as a funny and light story, which "makes you feel good". The daily Sud Ouest considered the novel a "pure example of the chick lit". The book became a bestseller. In the same year Virginie Grimaldi signed with the publisher Fayard.

In 2016, she published a second novel: Tu comprendras quand tu seras plus grande. In that book Julia, a miserable psychologist, takes on a new lease of life by working in a nursing home in Southern France. The cultural news website Just Focus says it has "a witty humour, endearing characters and a deep sense of humanity", but also complains about "some repetitive clichés". The Belgian daily L'Avenir ranks it among its 10 feel-good and chick lit books that "make you feel good", emphasizing the amusing, vivid and addicting style of Virginie Grimaldi. This book also became a bestseller, and the film rights were sold.

Grimaldi published her third novel in 2017, Le parfum du bonheur est plus fort sous la pluie, in which Pauline, after breaking up with her husband Ben, tries to win him back by writing him letters. The newspaper Libération welcomed "a well put together story […] in the same style as the feel-good novel or chick lit", as well as the sincerity and the touching writing of Virginie Grimaldi, while deploring two-dimensional characters. The Culturellement Vôtre webzine cheers the "volte-face" of the characters, who are not actually who they seem to appear, and the book exudes sensitivity and melancholy. The literary magazine ActuaLitté also appreciated the fact that the characters were not who they seemed to be: "the author reminds us – with simplicity and sincerity – that everybody creates their own reality". The work became a bestseller, and was among the 12 novels shortlisted for the 48th Prix Maison de la Presse.

In 2018, she published her fourth novel, Il est grand temps de rallumer les étoiles (the title refers to The Breasts of Tiresias by Guillaume Apollinaire). She sold the film rights even before the book was published. The story is devoted to mother-daughter relationships and is told from the point of view of 3 different women: Anna, a divorced mother in financial difficulties, and her daughters Lily (12) and Chloé (17). The website Aufeminin.com enjoyed the portrait of women who are "endearing and universal" and Virginie Grimaldi's ability to "surprise the reader with humour and delicacy". Libération thought the work presented "a touch of the feel-good novel or chick lit", but complained about the "ad nauseam" jokes of the younger daughter, Lily, while underlining the "nostalgic joy" that emerges from the book. That novel also became a bestseller.

Also in 2018, she published Chère Mamie, a collection of humorous "postcards", originally posted on Instagram and addressed to her grandmother. Any profits from the book were assigned to the association Cékedubonheur, which organizes playful activities for hospitalized children. According to Le Figaro/GfK, Grimaldi was in 2018 the second most read French writer in France, and held sixth place among the Top 10 novelists who had sold the most books on the national territory.

In April 2019, explaining the superficial image of "feel-good" literature of the type she writes, she declared to the daily newspaper Le Parisien that the authors of that genre have collectively "made mistakes", and shared that she herself had not liked her first covers and found some of her titles too lightweight. Le Parisien even thinks that Virginie Grimaldi wandered from the canons of that literary genre in her new novel, with the writer clarifying in that regard: "I hate stories have too much of a happy ending. I'm not out to inspire something positive at all costs". Titled Quand nos souvenirs viendront danser, the book was published in May 2019. With a print-run of 100,000, it quickly became a bestseller. It tells the story of the 84-year-old Marceline, determined to defend her neighbourhood and her octogenarian neighbours from the threats of a mayor who wants to raze everything to the ground, describing her life, her memories and her fight. Le Parisien notes that Virginie Grimaldi "deals with subjects as deep as they are moving", such as death or ageing, and that "her pen is becoming lighter, and her explorations more personal". The newspaper furthermore regarded this fifth novel as her best and most successful. In the same year Virginie Grimaldi reached the third place in the Le Figaro/GfK Top 10 of French novelists having sold the most books in France in 2019, with more than 700,000 volumes sold.

On 20 October 2020, she published Chère Mamie au pays du confinement the profits from which went to the APHP. It is the sequel to her book Chère Mamie.

== Publications ==
Novels

- 2015: Le premier jour du reste de ma vie. City Éditions. 2015. ISBN 978-2-8246-0539-5.
- 2016: Tu comprendras quand tu seras plus grande (in French). Paris: Fayard. 2016. ISBN 978-2-213-68744-5.
- 2017: Le parfum du bonheur est plus fort sous la pluie (in French). Paris: Fayard. 2017. ISBN 978-2-213-70473-9.
- 2018: Il est grand temps de rallumer les étoiles (in French). Paris: Fayard. 2018. ISBN 978-2-213-70970-3.
- 2019: Quand nos souvenirs viendront danser (in French). Paris: Fayard. 2019. ISBN 978-2-213-70983-3.
- 2020: Et que ne durent que les moments doux (in French). Paris: Fayard. 2020. ISBN 978-2-213-70984-0.
- 2022: Il nous restera ça (in French). Paris: Fayard. 2022. ISBN 978-2-213-71708-1.

Short stories

- 2014: La peinture sur la bouche - 2nd prize E-crire Aufeminin
- 2016: La Rencontre – written for the lifestyle magazine Elle

Collections

- 2018: Chère Mamie. Le Livre de Poche. 2018. ISBN 978-2-253-10079-9. joint publication with Fayard.
- 2020: Chère Mamie au pays du confinement. Le Livre de Poche. 2020. ISBN 978-2-253-07868-5.
