= Frank Sanello =

American journalist

- Born: 17 May 1952 (age 74); Joliet, Illinois, USA
- Education: BA (English literature); MFA (Screenwriting)
- Alma mater: University of Chicago
- Writing career
- Language: English

Frank Sanello (born May 17, 1952) is an author and journalist who writes about the entertainment industry, cultural anthropology, politics, social issues, and revisionist history.

== Early life and career ==
Born and raised in Joliet, Illinois, he graduated from University of Chicago with a BA in English literature, and from University of California, Los Angeles with an MFA in screenwriting.

Before becoming an author, Sanello wrote for various outlets such as The New York Times Syndicate, the Los Angeles Daily News, the Los Angeles Times, The Washington Post, The Boston Globe, the Chicago Sun-Times, and the Chicago Tribune. He was also a reporter for People Weekly and Us Weekly. In 1986 he worked as a segment producer pre-interviewing guests for the host of The Late Show Starring Joan Rivers.

His two weekly columns about the entertainment industries were syndicated internationally by United Media in the 1980s and 1990s. During that time, Sanello interviewed dozens of film and TV executives and hundreds of actors, producers and directors.

== Reviews ==
Publication of The Opium Wars (2002) in China was unusual because Chinese scholars and government watchdogs typically rejected Western accounts of their history as biased and Eurocentric. The book attempted to offer a more balanced account of the two conflicts fought between Britain and China in the mid-19th century. In his critique of The Opium Wars in the East Asian Review of Books, Wayne E. Yang wrote: "Those who believe the dictum that 'those who fail to learn [from] history are doomed to repeat it' have fodder in W. Travis Hanes III and Frank Sanello's The Opium Wars." In a review for the American Library Association's Booklist, Jay Freeman wrote: "[This] account of the causes, military campaigns, and tragic effects of these wars is absorbing, frequently macabre, and deeply unsettling." Publishers Weekly wrote, "Hanes (Imperial Diplomacy in the Era of Decolonization) and film author and former Los Angeles Daily News critic Sanello have teamed up to produce this fine popular account... The book covers a familiar time and place in history, but the authors make some nice analogies between the brutal economics and empire of the 19th century, and 21st-century forms of money, politics and war."

The cautionary nature of Sanello's Tweakers: How Crystal Meth Is Ravaging Gay America (2005) was noted in a review in the gay magazine, Edge Boston: "More than 250 crystal users and those who treat them were interviewed for this book. One after another, stories were told of lives destroyed by a seductive drug." As a gay activist, Sanello has lectured on methamphetamine abuse in the gay community and was a guest-speaker on the topic at a conference and seminar in San Francisco. Tweakers was the source of a feature-length video of the same name in 2007, and featured grim, on-camera accounts of recovering and active methamphetamine addicts, adapted from case histories in Sanello's book.

Another nonfiction book by Sanello, The Knights Templars: God’s Warriors, the Devil’s Bankers, garnered international interest because of The Da Vinci Code’s fictional treatment of the Medieval monastic order. Sanello’s examination of the Templars, which debunked myths about their survival today as Freemasons, was also published in the Czech Republic and elsewhere.

The author taught college-extension courses at the Gay & Lesbian Center in Los Angeles on how to write and find a publisher for a nonfiction book. He also taught English composition at the University of Phoenix.

== Libel case ==
In 1999, Rosenfeld, Meyer & Susman sued Sanello and Carol Publishing for $30 million, for defamation. In Naked Instinct: The Unauthorized Biography of Sharon Stone, (Carol Publishing, 1997) Sanello had quoted comments a jury later determined had been made by William Skrzyniarz, a partner at the firm which represented Stone, concerning Stone's private life.

The libel suit was generated by a brief passage in Sanello's biography of Stone: "Although I had identified myself as Stone's biographer, one of Meyer's partners, William Skrzyniarz, told me after two bottles of Merlot on New Year's Eve 1996, 'When Sharon wants someone, she rents a hotel room and tells him exactly when and where to show up. She makes it clear it's a one-time opportunity, take it or leave it. She's made the move on some major names.' Skrzyniarz became circumspect when I asked him to name names."

The lawsuit was not intended to determine if the information Sanello quoted about Stone's private life in his biography of the actress was true because Stone did not sue the publisher or her biographer. The lawsuit was filed by Rosenfeld, Meyer, & Susman to prove that a member of its firm, Skrzyniarz, had not told Sanello information about the actress' private life. The jury determined that Sanello and the publisher had not defamed Skrzyniarz or Rosenfeld, Meyer & Susman. Sanello and the publisher were also acquitted of another charge, tortious interference, that alleged Sanello's biography had prompted the firm's star client to seek alternate counsel and thus had economically damaged the firm.

The case did not involve determining whether or not the comments about Stone's private life attributed to Skrzyniarz by Sanello were true. The suit alleged that Skrzyniarz had never made the comments quoted by Sanello in Stone's bio and consequently that the publisher and author had libeled Skrzyniarz and his law firm.

After a four-week trial in Los Angeles Superior Court in Santa Monica, Calif., the jury found in favor of the publisher of Naked Instinct, Schragis, and the author, Sanello. The jurors determined that the law firm of Rosenfeld, Meyer & Susman had not been libeled or economically damaged. The legal term for economic damage is "unlawful interference with economic interests."

== Works ==
- Spielberg: The Man, the Movies, the Mythology, Taylor Pub. Co., 1996, ISBN 978-0-87833-911-2.
- Naked Instinct: The Unauthorized Biography of Sharon Stone, Carol Pub. Group, 1997, ISBN 978-1-55972-402-9.
- Eddie Murphy: The Life and Times of a Comic on the Edge, Carol Pub. Group, 1997, ISBN 978-1-55972-437-1.
- Jimmy Stewart: A Wonderful Life, Pinnacle Books, 1997, ISBN 978-0-7860-0506-2.
- Stallone: A Rocky Life, Mainstream, 1998, ISBN 978-1-84018-113-5.
- Julia Roberts, Mainstream Publishing, 2000, ISBN 978-1-84018-270-5.
- Halle Berry: A Stormy Life, Virgin Books, 2003, ISBN 978-1-85227-092-6.
- Reel V. Real: How Hollywood Turns Fact Into Fiction, Taylor Trade Pub., 2003, ISBN 978-0-87833-268-7.
- The Knights Templars: God’s Warriors, the Devil’s Bankers, Taylor Trade Pub., 2003, ISBN 978-0-87833-302-8.
- The Opium Wars: The Addiction of One Empire and the Corruption of Another, Hanes, W. Travis III and Frank Sanello. Sourcebooks, 2002, ISBN 978-1-57071-931-8, ISBN 978-1-4022-0149-3.
- Tweakers: How Crystal Meth Is Ravaging Gay America, Alyson Books, 2005, ISBN 978-1-55583-884-3.
- To Kill a King: A History of Royal Murders and Assassinations from Ancient Egypt to the Present, CreateSpace, 2011, ISBN 978-1-4499-8273-7.
- The Autobiography of Frau Adolf Hitler: Translated and edited by Frank Sanello, CreateSpace, 2012, ISBN 978-1-4775-8172-8.

== Reviews ==
- "The Opium Wars by W. Travis Hanes III and Frank Sanello", Asian Review of Books, Wayne E. Yang
- "Spielberg: The Man, the Movies, the Mythology", Publishers Weekly, 01/01/1996
- "THE OPIUM WARS: The Addiction of One Empire and the Corruption of Another", Publishers Weekly, 09/16/2002
