= The Selection =

Young adult novel by Kiera Cass

- Cover art for The Selection
- Author: Kiera Cass
- Language: English
- Series: The Selection
- Genre: Dystopian, Young adult, Romance
- Publisher: HarperCollins
- Publication date: April 14, 2012
- Publication place: United States and China
- Media type: Print, ebook, audiobook
- Pages: 328 pages
- ISBN: 978-0-545-61494-8
- Followed by: The Elite

The Selection is a young adult novel by Kiera Cass first published on April 14, 2012, by HarperCollins. It is the first in a five-book series, followed by The Elite (2013), The One (2014), The Heir (2015) and The Crown (May 2016). The last two take place twenty years after the events in the first three.

In addition, four spin-off novellas were released. Three of them, The Prince, The Guard and The Favourite are narrated from the point of view of three supporting characters. The Queen, instead, is a prequel, focusing on a supporting character from the main series. All four novellas were collected into one volume Happily Ever After, including bonus content and epilogues.

Kiera Cass stated that she began writing The Selection after thinking about the differences between Esther and Cinderella, wondering if either of them were happy with how they ended up. She also commented that she had written the book "from start to finish", while her writing process for the other books differed.

== Plot ==
In a futuristic world, society is divided into castes, with Ones being the most prosperous, consisting of royals and elites, and Eights being mostly orphans/homeless, drug users, handicapped, and unemployable. America Singer is a Five, the "artist" caste (e.g. musicians, artists, dancers, etc.). Since their prosperity depends on their desirability, Fives live a lower-class life. America, however, does not care, because she enjoys entertaining, especially with a violin, piano, and her voice.

The prince of Illéa, Maxon Schreave, announces that he is following in his father's footsteps by holding the Selection, a competition for the prince's hand in marriage and the crown. America initially has no interest in entering the competition despite pressure from her mother, but Aspen, her next-door neighbor and secret boyfriend, ultimately convinces her to enter into the Selection.

After her mother has a conversation with America allowing her to keep half of her earnings, America decides to surprise Aspen with dinner at her treehouse. This upsets him, as he believes he should be the one to provide for her, but is unable to because he is a Six (the servant caste) and has no means of doing so since he already has to take care of his mother and siblings. In the end, Aspen decides to break up with America. The end of their relationship, plus a bribe from her mother, leads America to enter the Selection.

In the palace, she has to compete with 34 other girls for the prince's heart. America makes friends (Marlee Tames, a Four and a farmer) and enemies (Celeste Newsome, a Two and a model) within the first week of her stay, but her unique personality also catches the attention of the palace staff and the country. She still does not want to marry Prince Maxon, but a chance meeting in the gardens causes them to befriend each other. America still loves Aspen, but she gradually starts to fall in love with the prince. Maxon gives America his first kiss, and she begins to think that she could maybe marry him and forget Aspen. Rebels constantly attack the palace, which helps turn away the weak-hearted competitors, but also makes things tense, especially when the rebels seem to be getting closer. America starts to feel jealous of Maxon spending time with the other Selected.

America eventually sees Aspen again when he enters the palace as a new member of the guard. He was drafted into the army, where he earned top honors. Aspen's sudden appearance confuses America's feelings even more and she begins to feel like she is still in love with him when he sneaks into her room to see her. Having a romantic relationship with someone other than the prince during the competition is considered treason, and the punishment for treason can be as severe as death. America meets with Aspen anyway.

After a rebel attack leads to three of the Selected leaving, Prince Maxon decides to narrow down the girls to six, calling them The Elite. When America is named one of them, she realizes that she does have feelings for Maxon and could see herself happy with him. She tells Aspen that she cannot continue their romantic liaisons. Instead of getting discouraged, Aspen claims that he will fight even harder to win her love again. The book ends with America finally realizing that she is exactly where she ought to be—among the Elite.

== Characters ==
- America Singer – Like her red hair, America takes a rebellious attitude in concept. She tends to have a short temper, which she inherited from her mother. Despite saying she has no leadership skills, America is not afraid to speak her mind. For example, when the palace was under rebel attack by the Southerners, Silvia ordered America's maids to bring food and drink to the Selected. America, however, told her that the girls can take care of themselves, and ordered Anne to provide food for the royal family only. She is very stubborn and persistent at times and may jump to conclusions a lot. She can also be hypocritical but always apologizes if she is proven wrong. America's greatest fear when entering the Selection was losing her individuality, something the other Selected girls would give up to take over the throne. Overall, America is a very courageous person that, at the end of the day, will always realize the mistakes she might have caused and will do anything to make things right. She is always afraid of losing someone she loves.
- Prince Maxon – When America first saw Maxon on TV, she believed he was a shallow and stuck-up person. Thus, when she meets him for one of the first times, she misunderstands his intentions and knees him in the groin. However, he forgives her and she later discovered that he was actually very kind and a gentleman. The two eventually became friends, talking to each other, sharing secrets, and having fun together. America guided him to better understand his kingdom and to help the lower castes. Maxon admires America for her strong will, courage, kindness, and sense of honor. At the beginning of the Selection, he mentions that he wants to be around her so that these features would rub off on him. He likes honesty and truth and he specifically asked America to trust him and his decisions and always be open with him. He is very private: he does not like when people interfere with his personal life (especially during the Selection where cameras follow his every step) or when the Elites gossip with each other about what he does or does not do with them.
- Aspen Leger – Loves America and plans to marry her eventually but knows it is better for her to enter the Selection to help her family. America continuously has Aspen on her mind through several parts of the novel. He questions the relationship that she has with Maxon often because of the complicated past he has with America. After America is picked for the Selection, he is drafted into the army where he earns top honors in his class, and then promoted to a member of the Royal Guard at the palace.
- Marlee Tames – A member of the Elite and best friend of America. Marlee first meets America as they are leaving for the palace. America and Marlee bond as soon as they board the plane. The two quickly become friends and get along fine. After Marlee's first date with Prince Maxon, Marlee loses interest in the prince but does not want to leave the Selection for personal reasons.
- Celeste Newsome – A member of the Elite, she is a Two and worked as a model. Celeste holds a sense of superiority over the lower caste competitors like America and Marlee. She is confident and arrogant, knows how to use her beauty, and is willing to do anything to win, even breaking the rules of the Selection. She provokes one of the Selected into slapping her, which gets them kicked out of the competition (because violence against other competitors is against the rules). She uses other tactics to get other members of the Selected to be disqualified.
- Kriss Ambers – A member of the Elite and is a Three.
- Elise Whisks – A member of the Elite and is a Four. She has family connections to New Asia, a country that Illéa is at war with.
- Natalie Luca – A member of the Elite and is a Four. She is viewed as someone who has her head in the clouds.
- Clarkson Schreave – King of Illéa and Maxon's father, he is often seen as strict. The girls react with fear when he gets angry. America dislikes him.
- Amberly Schreave – Queen of Illéa and Maxon's mother. She is from Honduragua and was a Four until she married King Clarkson at the end of his Selection. She is described as kindhearted by America. She is very loved by all her people.
- America's family − Kenna (originally a Five but married a man named James Orders [a Four and factory worker] and is currently pregnant), Kota (an artist who is estranged from his family), May (a painter), and Gerad (the baby of the family who has yet to pick a profession).

== Reception ==
Publishers Weekly gave a positive review for the book, praising the character of America. The School Library Journal, MTV, and Booklist all gave positive reviews for The Selection while in contrast, Kirkus Reviews panned the novel. The A.V. Club gave a mostly positive review, commenting that it "is something of a Hunger Games rip-off, but at least it's an entertaining one". It won the 2017 Young Hoosier Book Award (Middle Grade).

== Controversy ==
On January 12, 2012, a one-star review of Cass' book, The Selection, was posted on the reviewer's blog. Later on the same day, Kiera Cass' literary agent, Elana Roth, posted a series of derogatory tweets on the social networking site Twitter. In a conversation that Cass and Roth allegedly believed was private—but was, in fact, public—Roth called the reviewer names, and both Roth and Cass collaborated on how best to bump the negative review down and boost positive reviews by manipulating the ranking system themselves. The controversy sparked an article by Publishers Weekly speaking out against this practice and raised an outcry from multiple reviewers, bloggers, and publications against the cyber-bullying of nonprofessional reviewers by authors and agents.

== Adaptations ==
In 2012, Cass announced that The CW had optioned the rights to her series with the intent of turning it into a television series. The series would star Aimee Teegarden as America Singer, but the pilot was passed on for the fall 2012 television season. A second pilot was ordered for the CW in 2013, starring Yael Grobglas as the same character but was also passed on by the network.

In 2015, Warner Bros. announced they had bought the film rights of the book. Denise Di Novi and Alison Greenspan of DiNovi Pictures would produce alongside Pouya Shahbazian, with Katie Lovejoy to write the screenplay.

In April 2020, it was announced that Netflix would be adapting the first book. As stated in a Variety article, it is going to be directed by Saudi Arabian filmmaker Haifaa Al-Mansour, previously partnered with Netflix on 2018's Nappily Ever After. Pouya Shahbazian and Denise Di Novi are set to produce, with Margaret French Isaac as executive producer. In May 2023, Netflix decided to cancel plans to produce the movie, but they still maintain film rights for the next few years.
