= Bookish =

Book sales website

Bookish, LLC.
- Website type: Content discovery, eCommerce
- Available in: English
- Founded: 2011
- Headquarters: New York City, United States
- Key people: Ardy Khazaei (CEO), Chris Sim (CTO)
- Website: www.bookish.com
- Advertising: Web banners
- Launched: February 2013

Bookish.com is a content discovery and ecommerce website, which launched in February 2013, devoted to books. The site allows users to browse an extensive database of books and authors, add books to user-created digital "shelves", get custom book recommendations, read editorial content and purchase physical books, ebooks, and audiobooks.

== History ==
Bookish was founded in 2011 in a joint venture backed by three of the big six publishing companies – Hachette Book Group, Penguin Group (USA), and Simon & Schuster – with the goal of increasing the presence of book publishers in the book-buying industry, as well as to expand the overall book-buying market.

The site was expected to launch in the summer of 2011, but was delayed due to technical issues relating to data compilation, as well as a lawsuit filed by the United States Department of Justice in 2012 against Apple Inc. and five major publishing companies regarding the pricing of ebooks. The site officially launched in February 2013 with the support of sixteen additional publishing companies.

== Features ==
- Online bookstore
- Custom book recommendations
- User-created digital bookshelves
- Goodreads shelf-import feature
- Book lists, reviews, and listicles
- eReader app for Android/iPhone
- Articles, newsletters, and author interviews

== Acquisition ==
In early 2014, online ebook retailer Zola Books, attracted by the site's sophisticated “algorithmic software” that offers reading suggestions, acquired Bookish.

== See also ==
- aNobii
- BookArmy
- Readgeek
