= Readgeek =

Online book recommendations engine and social cataloging service

- homepage of Readgeek
- Website type: Book
- Available in: English, Spanish, German,
- Creator: Uwe Pilz
- Website: readgeek.com
- Registration: Free
- Current status: Active

Readgeek is an online book recommendations engine and social cataloging service launched in December 2010. The website allows users to search for books matching their individual taste making use of several algorithms. Taking ratings and metadata of prior read books into account, those algorithms help the site to learn about a users preferences. The service suggests books other users with similar tastes have enjoyed, rather than offering up books similar to the ones a user already ranked.

It is the first of its kind to give users a prediction of how much they will like almost any book. Users can also create reading lists, book discussions and follow the activities of other users. The company was invited in 2016 by the Dutch General Publishers Association to a worldwide innovation-competition for startups in the publishing industry. The company's offices are in Berlin, Germany.

== See also ==
- Library 2.0 is the concept behind Readgeek from a users perspective
- Collaborative filtering and
- Item-item collaborative filtering explain some background about the used algorithms
