= Shelfari =

Defunct social cataloging website for books

- Type: Subsidiary
- Industry: Online book community
- Founded: October 11, 2006; 19 years ago
- Founders: Josh Hug, Kevin Beukelman, Mark Williamson
- Defunct: 2016
- Headquarters: Seattle, Washington, U.S.
- Key people: Josh Hug (CEO); Kevin Beukelman (Chief Architect); Dave Hanley (VP Marketing); Ian Patterson (Lead Designer)
- Parent: Amazon.com
- Website: www.shelfari.com

Shelfari was a social cataloging website. Shelfari users built virtual bookshelves of the titles they owned or had read, and could rate, review, tag, and discuss their books. Users could also create groups that other members could join, create discussions, and talk about books, or other topics. Recommendations could be sent to friends on the site for what books to read.

Shelfari was launched on October 11, 2006. In February 2007, Amazon invested $1 million in Shelfari, and moved to acquire it a year later in August 2008. In January 2016, it was announced that Shelfari was being merged into Goodreads. As of June 2016, the site was decommissioned (all links redirect to Goodreads' website). There were user complaints that not all features were moved.

== History ==
=== Founding and marketing ===
Shelfari was founded by RealNetworks alumni Josh Hug and Kevin Beukelman (both software developers), and Mark Williamson (who never joined the company full-time) under the name Tastemakers, Inc., along with designer Ian Patterson. Tastemakers sought to create a social networking service that met the needs of avid readers. This strategy may have mirrored a trend during this time period of creating niche social networks such as social movie site Flixster.

Shelfari launched in October 2006. It allowed books to be searched by title, author, ISBN, or subject. It was free, unlike LibraryThing, regardless of how many books had been collected in lists. Shelfari also allowed for the creation of user groups by users, which each group given a "common shelf" where users could contribute titles, with an attached forum for discussion and an introductory page. The website first went live on October 10, 2006. At the time, it planned on earning money by passing leads on to online booksellers and taking a 5 to 10 percent cut of resultant sales. There were plans to allow cataloging for CDs and DVDs.

Once Shelfari received its first equity fund raise in early 2007 the company grew to five employees, including software developer Kevin Durdle, designer Timothy Gray, and VP of marketing Dave Hanley. New features were introduced to Shelfari in December 2007, with books in bookshelves given realistic book covers.

=== Amazon and shutdown ===
In August 2008, the company was acquired by Amazon.com. After it was acquired, Josh Hug remained CEO of the company. The team was integrated into the book technology group.

After the purchase by Amazon, an Amazon account was required in 2012 to log into Shelfari.

Shelfari continued to function as an independent book social network within the Amazon.com family of sites until January 2016, when Amazon announced on Shelfari.com that it would be merging Shelfari with Goodreads and closing down Shelfari. To prepare Shelfari members for the move, Amazon posted on Shelfari.com a prominent announcement stating, "IMPORTANT ANNOUNCEMENT: Shelfari is merging with Goodreads. Learn More", as well as links to a page titled "Read the FAQ", instructions to "Download your data in a CSV file" (whose linked page is titled "Export Everything"), and instructions to "Move to Goodreads" (whose linked page is titled "Export Invitation"), along with two months to migrate their Shelfari content to Goodreads. Although Shelfari discussion threads will not be migrated (as Amazon would need permission from all conversants in order to do so), users were advised: "you may save your own data for your own records".

== Features ==
Shelfari promoted its "virtual bookshelf" as one of its main features. The virtual bookshelf displayed covers of books which the user has entered, with popups to show the user's book information (review, rating, and tags). Sorting by author, title, date, rating, or review was available to the viewer of the shelf. Users could organize books into different shelves, including already read, currently reading, planning to read, wish list, currently owned, and favorites.

The Shelfari catalog could be edited by users, though some changes had to be approved by Shelfari "librarians". Using wiki functionality users could edit each book's authors, title, publication data, table of contents, first sentence, and series. Users could also combine redundant books into a single entry or add new titles not found in the catalog. Similar to books, author pages could be edited or created. In addition to general catalog maintenance, users were encouraged to contribute reviews, descriptions, lists of characters and settings, author biographies, categories, and descriptive tags.

Most books in the Shelfari catalog came from the large Amazon catalog, including Amazon Marketplace listings added by independent resellers. These books linked back to Amazon and displayed pricing and links to AbeBooks for used book sales.

Shelfari had a group creator, which allows members to create group threads within which to talk, play, or discuss books.

== Criticism ==
Shelfari received bad press for its "Invite Friends" page. Jesse Wegman, writing in The New York Observer in October 2007, complained that because he had "accidentally failed to uncheck the approximately 1,500 names in my Gmail address book that Shelfari had helpfully pre-checked", the system caused invitations to be sent, contrary to his intentions but "ostensibly" from his own address, to his entire network of contacts. In November 2007, Shelfari was accused of astroturfing by Tim Spalding, the creator of LibraryThing, a competing social networking book site. In a comment on another blog critical of Shelfari (primarily criticizing the "invitations" system), Josh Hug, the CEO, blamed the astroturfing on an intern not knowing better, and said that it had stopped.

== See also ==
- List of social networking websites
- Virtual community
