= Social cataloging application =

Collaborative cataloging of literature

A social cataloging application is a web application designed to help users to catalog pieces of media such as books, films, television shows, albums, video games, etc. consumed, owned, or otherwise of interest to them. The phrase refers to characteristics that generally arise from a multi-user cataloging environment:

- The ability to share catalogs and interact with others based upon shared items
- The enrichment or improvement of cataloging description through either explicit cooperation in the production of cataloging metadata or through the analysis of implicit data (e.g. "people who like X also like Y").

== See also ==
- Comparison of reference management software
- List of social bookmarking websites
- Recommender system
- Goodreads
- The StoryGraph
- LibraryThing
- Anobii
- Letterboxd
- Rate Your Music
- MyAnimeList
- IMDb
- BookLikes
