= Douban =

Chinese social networking website

Douban 豆瓣
- Website type: Web 2.0, Social network service, Online music, movie and book database
- Available in: Chinese
- Key people: Yang Bo
- Website: www.douban.com
- Commercial: Yes
- Registration: Optional
- Launched: March 6, 2005
- Current status: Active

Douban.com (Chinese: 豆瓣; pinyin: Dòubàn), launched on 6 March 2005, is a Chinese online database and social networking service that allows registered users to record information and create content related to film, books, music, recent events, and activities in Chinese cities. Douban is named after a hutong in Chaoyang District, Beijing where the founder lived while he began work on the website.

Douban was formerly open to both registered and unregistered users. For registered users, the website recommends potentially interesting books, movies, and music to them in addition to serving as a social network website such as WeChat, Weibo and a record keeper. For unregistered users, the website is a place to find ratings and reviews of media.

Douban has about 200 million registered users as of 2013 and some Chinese authors as well as critics register their official personal pages on the site. The platform has been compared to other review sites such as IMDb, Rotten Tomatoes and Goodreads.

== Founder ==
Douban (Beijing Douwang Technology Co. Ltd.) was founded by Yang Bo (杨勃). He majored in physics at Tsinghua University before he attended University of California, San Diego as a PhD student. After receiving his PhD in computational physics, he worked as a research scientist at IBM. Later, he returned to China, becoming the CTO of a software company founded by one of his friends.

In 2005, Yang started to create a website for travelling named Lüzong (驴宗), initially a one-person project at a Starbucks in Beijing. In a couple of months, however, the site was transformed into what is now known as Douban.com.

The name "Douban" originated from the fact that its founder, Yang Bo, wrote the website's source code in a café near Douban Hutong in Beijing when creating the site. Therefore, it was named Douban.com

Unlike Rotten Tomatoes, where professional film critics provide ratings, platforms such as Douban and Mtime allow anyone to rate films (even before they are released). As a result, there have been instances of users maliciously inflating or deflating scores for personal interests and purposes.

In the article "Eight Questions About Douban Movie Ratings" published on the "Daily Douban" WeChat account, founder Ah Bei publicly explained Douban's anti-cheating and anti-manipulation mechanisms, and stated that there is no backend function to "modify movie scores," ensuring the fairness of its rating system.

According to a Southern Weekly report in 2018, although Douban has not eliminated the phenomenon of paid review groups manipulating scores, its platform structure and anti-manipulation measures make it so that score manipulation can only be done manually, resulting in costs several times higher than on many other platforms.

== Timeline ==
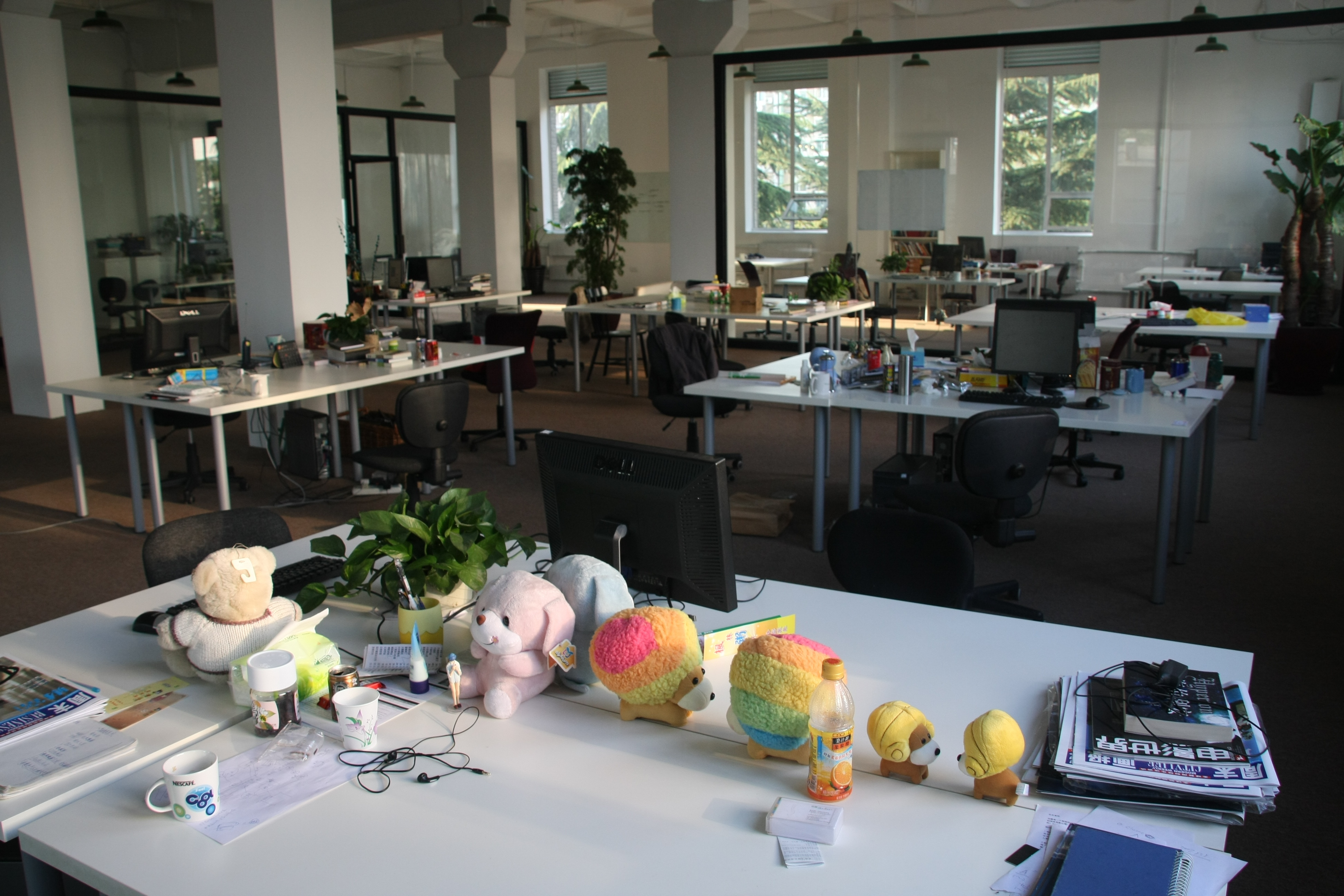
Office of Douban.com

- 2005
  - March 6, account registration opened to the public
  - March 8, Group (小组) was released
  - March 9, the first topic appeared in the Group
  - July 6, the traditional Chinese version of the website published
  - August 23, Douban Location (豆瓣同城) was released to allow users to share and discover local events and activities
  - December 8, English version of the website opened for public testing
- 2013
  - Douban announced that Douban covered 200 million monthly independent users in the second and third quarters of 2013, double the same period last year.
  - As of September 2013, Douban has 16.7 million book entries, 320 million movie reviews, 1.06 million music entries, 27,000 independent musicians, and 380,000 various interest groups.
  - September 17, 2013, "Douban Dongxi" (豆瓣东西) was released
  - Until September 2013, Douban had more than 75 million registered users, mainly from first- and second-tier cities across the country, with an average daily PV of 210 million.
- 2016
  - Until the end of 2016, Douban had 150 million registered users and 300 million monthly active users
- 2017
  - Douban launches content-paid product "Douban Time" (豆瓣时间)
  - Douban's CEO YangBo announced a restructuring of the company's business lines to achieve a balance between costs and revenue, laying the groundwork for a potential overseas listing.
- 2020
  - Beijing Douban Technology Co., Ltd., a subsidiary of Douban.com, had a significant business information change on July 8. The shareholders and business scope changed.
  - The company's business scope has expanded from "Internet dissemination of officially published book content" to "publishing literary original digital works, digital works consistent with the content of published publications in China," Beijing Douwang Technology Co., Ltd.
  - Douban achieved the permission to publish original literary e-books.

== Controversies ==
=== Censorship ===
Douban has attracted a large number of intellectuals who are eager to discuss social issues. This makes Douban vulnerable to censorship by the Chinese government. Douban reviews all content posted on the website, preventing some material from being posted in the first place, and taking down other materials after the fact.

==== Removal of the Renaissance ====
In March 2009, Douban removed art paintings of the Renaissance on the grounds that they contained 'pornographic' elements. This led to a campaign called "Portraits: Dress up" in which internet users were asked to dress up images of famous renaissance nudes in a protest against Douban's self-censorship. The administrators then removed the discussion about the campaign.

==== Keyword bans ====
That year also saw the 20th anniversary of the 1989 Tiananmen Square protests and massacre, and Douban further extended its keyword list to ban any terms that are likely to relate to the incident. This angered some members, causing them to move to other similar websites that employ less strict self-censorship policies.

==== LGBTQ groups ====
In 2011, some Chinese lesbian, gay, bisexual, transgender, and queer (LGBTQ) groups announced that they had planned to boycott Douban as their posts announcing an LGBTQ-themed film festival had been censored by the website. In mainland China, films and television programs with LGBTQ themes are subject to state censorship.

==== Academy Awards ====
In 2021 amid controversy surrounding the 93rd Academy Awards over scrutiny of Nomadland director Chloé Zhao, Douban removed mentions of films' Academy Awards wins and nominations from its film pages. However, comments about the Academy Awards by Douban users remained on the site.

=== The Wandering Earth ratings ===
Douban has been accused that many users of Douban purposely gave The Wandering Earth, a 2019 Chinese science-fiction film, one star. Critics further accused that some users "change their given five stars to one star" and some users are paid to give one star to the film, which later turned out to be false. On 12 February 2019, Douban officially announced that "mass score-changing is abnormal and it won't be counted in the total score. To avoid such incidents, we are urgently optimizing product features." in its official Sina Weibo account.

=== New releases ===
On December 27, 2016, People's Daily's mobile app republished an article from China Film News, retitling it as "Ratings on Douban and Maoyan Face Credibility Crisis; Negative Reviews Harm the Film Industry." The article reported that the low ratings on Douban and Maoyan for three major holiday-season releases — Railroad Tigers, See You Tomorrow, and The Great Wall—left many moviegoers disappointed in Chinese New Year domestic films, and even deterred some from watching them.

Some netizens worried that the authorities might tighten control over Douban and other online communities in order to protect domestic films. They voiced objections online, refuting accusations in the article that malicious "review brigades" were manipulating ratings.

However, on December 28, People's Daily's commentary section published an article titled "Chinese Cinema Must Have the Tolerance for One-Star Reviews." The commentary argued that acknowledging moviegoers' right to "vote with their feet" also means acknowledging their right to give star ratings; both are forms of choice. The piece distanced itself from the earlier criticism of negative reviews.

=== Rating ===
Researchers have found correlations between Douban ratings and domestic box-office performance, making manipulation allegations particularly notable for stakeholders.

In February 2011, a Sina Weibo user named "Xue Mang" revealed that a year earlier, he had fabricated a non-existent "film" titled Even If Kafka Turned Into a Beetle, He Still Couldn't Enter the Castle and created a related page on Douban. All of the "film content" was based on his personal experiences. A year later, this completely fictional "film" received an impressively high rating of 8.9 on Douban—on par with The Lord of the Rings and Let the Bullets Fly, and even surpassing Avatar and Titanic. Among the 235 users who rated it, as many as 88.8% gave it a full five stars. Additionally, 2,457 people marked that they "wanted to watch" the film, and some users even wrote detailed reviews discussing the plot specifics of this entirely fabricated work. After "Xue Mang" disclosed the truth about the hoax, Douban removed the page for the so-called "film".

However, on February 20, 2011, "Xue Mang" also stated on Weibo that many of the reviews were intentionally added by netizens after his post in order to "make the situation more fun." In 2016, due to media misunderstandings, he again clarified on Douban that the incident was "a long-running joke," and affirmed that "Douban is the most authoritative and credible film-rating platform in China".

== Platform comparisons ==
Douban has frequently been compared to international platforms such as IMDb and Goodreads due to its cataloging of films, books, and user-generated reviews.

Unlike IMDb, which is largely title-centric and industry-oriented, Douban integrates interest-based social communities ("Groups") that support discussions on a broader range of cultural and lifestyle topics.

Media outlets have noted that Douban's book-rating features resemble Goodreads, yet Douban places heavier emphasis on event listings and group interactions rather than personalized reading lists.

Compared with Rotten Tomatoes, where critic and audience scores are separate, Douban uses a single aggregated score drawn mainly from general users, which researchers have cited as having measurable effects on the Chinese box office.

Academic studies have reported that Douban's film ratings correlate with commercial performance in China more strongly than IMDb data, reflecting its localized cultural influence.

Compared to Weibo and WeChat, which are more focused on broad social networking and real-time communication, Douban remains centered on cultural interests and long-form discussion.

International analysis has described Douban as more niche and culture-oriented than mainstream Chinese platforms, attracting users interested in literature, independent film, and music subcultures.
