= LibraryThing =

Social cataloging web application

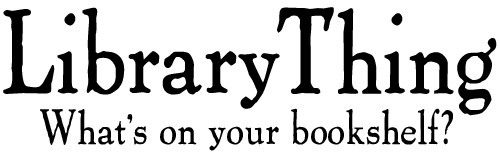
- Website type: Catalog and community
- Owners: Tim Spalding (majority); AbeBooks/Amazon (40%); CIG (minority)
- Creator: Tim Spalding
- Website: librarything.com
- Registration: Free
- Launched: August 29, 2005; 21 years ago
- Current status: Active

LibraryThing is a social cataloging web application for storing and sharing book catalogs and various types of book metadata. It is used by authors, individuals, libraries, and publishers.

== History ==
Based in Portland, Maine, LibraryThing was developed by Tim Spalding and went live on August 29, 2005, on a freemium subscriber business model, because "it was important to have customers, not an 'audience' we sell to advertisers." They focused instead on making a series of products for academic libraries. Motivated by the cataloging opportunities and financial challenges presented by the COVID-19 pandemic, the service went "free to all" on March 8, 2020, while maintaining a promise never to use advertising on registered users. As of February 2021, it has 2,600,000 users and more than 155 million books cataloged, drawing data from Amazon and from thousands of libraries that use the Z39.50 cataloging protocol.

== Features ==
The primary feature of LibraryThing (LT) is the cataloging of books, movies, music and other media by importing data from libraries through Z39.50 connections and from six Amazon.com stores. Library sources supply Dublin Core and MARC records to LT; users can import information from over 2000 libraries, including the British Library, Canadian National Catalogue, Library of Congress, National Library of Australia, and Yale University. Should a record not be available from any of these sources, it is also possible to input the book information manually via a blank form.

Each work may comprise different editions, translations, printings, audio versions, etc. Members are encouraged to add publicly visible reviews, descriptions, Common Knowledge and other information about a work; ratings, collections, and tags help categorization. Discussion in the forums is also encouraged.

Items are classified using the Melvil Decimal System, based on the out-of-copyright 1922 edition of the Dewey Decimal Classification with modifications for standard spelling of division names (as opposed to the original names, which were spelled in accordance with Dewey's advocated spelling reforms), and modernized terminology.

=== Social features ===
LibraryThing's social features have been compared to bookmark manager Del.icio.us and the collaborative music service Last.fm. Similar book cataloging sites include aNobii, BookLikes, Goodreads, Libib, Shelfari (now merged with Goodreads), and weRead.

=== TinyCat ===
In 2016, LibraryThing launched TinyCat, an OPAC designed for the cataloging and circulation of libraries of up to 20,000 items. TinyCat is marketed towards small independent libraries, such as schools, community centers, religious institutions, and academic departments, as well as individuals.

== Ownership ==
LibraryThing is majority owned by founder Tim Spalding. Online bookseller AbeBooks bought a 40% share in LibraryThing in May 2006 for an undisclosed sum. AbeBooks became a subsidiary of Amazon in 2008. In January 2009, Cambridge Information Group acquired a minority stake in LibraryThing, and their subsidiary Bowker became the official distributor to libraries.

== Publicity ==
At the end of June 2006, LibraryThing was subject to the Slashdot effect from a Wall Street Journal article. The site's developers added servers to compensate for the increased traffic. In December of the same year, the site received yet more attention from Slashdot over its UnSuggester feature, which draws suggestions from books least likely to appear in the same catalog as a given book.

== See also ==
- Bibliographic database
- Collective intelligence
- Crowdsourcing
- Enterprise bookmarking
- Folksonomy
- List of social networking services
- Virtual community
