= List of The Promised Neverland chapters =

First tankōbon volume cover, published in Japan by Shueisha on December 2, 2016

This is a list of chapters of the Japanese manga series The Promised Neverland, written by Kaiu Shirai and illustrated by Posuka Demizu. The individual chapters were originally serialized in Shueisha's Weekly Shōnen Jump from August 1, 2016, to June 15, 2020, with 181 chapters in all; the chapters were collected in twenty tankōbon volumes. The series has been licensed for English-language release by Viz Media. The first printed volume in North America was released on December 5, 2017.

A 16-page one-shot spin-off chapter about the character Ray titled, The First Shot was published in Weekly Shōnen Jump on October 5, 2020. A 36-page one-shot chapter about the character of Sister Krone titled, Seeking the Sky of Freedom was published in Weekly Shōnen Jump on December 7, 2020. A 19-page one-shot chapter titled, Dreams Come True was released at "The Promised Neverland Special Exhibition", event that was held in Tokyo from December 2020 to January 2021. A 32-page one-shot chapter about the character Isabella titled, A Mother's Determination was published in Weekly Shōnen Jump on December 14, 2020. A 32-page one-shot, titled We Were Born, was published in Weekly Shōnen Jump on January 4, 2021.

== Volumes ==
No.	Title	Original release date	English release date
1	Grace Field House; Gurēsu Fīrudo Hausu (GF(グレース = フィールド)ハウス)	December 2, 2016; 978-4-08-880872-7	December 5, 2017; 978-1-4215-9712-6
1. "Grace Field House" (GF(グレース = フィールド)ハウス, Gurēsu Fīrudo Hausu); 2. "The Way Out" (出口, Deguchi); 3. "The Iron Woman" (鉄の女, Tetsu no onna); 4. "The Best Option" ("最善", Saizen); 5. "She Got Us!" (やられた！, Yarareta!); 6. "Carol and Krone" (キャロルとクローネ, Kyaroru to Kurōne); 7. "We're Counting on You" (頼んだぞ, Tanonda zo)
Emma, Norman and Ray are the brightest kids at the Grace Field House orphanage, and under the care of the woman they refer to as "Mom", all the kids have enjoyed a comfortable life. Good food, clean clothes and the perfect environment to learn. One day, though, Emma and Norman uncover the dark truth of the outside world they are forbidden from seeing.
2	Control; Kontorōru (コントロール)	February 4, 2017; 978-4-08-881006-5	February 6, 2018; 978-1-4215-9713-3
8. "I Have An Idea" (考えがある, Kangae ga aru); 9. "Let's Play Tag" (鬼ごっこしましょう, Onigokko shimashō); 10. "Control" (コントロール, Kontorōru; lit. 'Control' in English); 11. "Traitor, Part 1" (内通者①, Naitsūsha 1); 12. "Traitor, Part 2" (内通者②, Naitsūsha 2); 13. "Traitor, Part 3" (内通者③, Naitsūsha 3); 14. "Trump Card" (切り札, Kirifuda); 15. "Never Again" (二度としないで, Ni-do to shinaide); 16. "The Secret Room and William Minerva, Part 1" (秘密の部屋とW(ウィリアム)・ミネルヴァ①, Himitsu no heya to Wiriamu Mineruva 1)
Behind the façade of a happy orphanage, the children of Grace Field House are secretly being raised as food for demons. Determined to save themselves and the other kids, Emma, Norman and Ray begin planning an escape. But their caretaker, "Mom", has brought in Sister Krone to help to keep the orphans in line.
3	Destroy!! Buchikowase!! (ブチ壊せ!!)	April 4, 2017; 978-4-08-881077-5	April 3, 2018; 978-1-4215-9714-0
17. "The Secret Room and William Minerva, Part 2" (秘密の部屋とW(ウィリアム)・ミネルヴァ②, Himitsu no heya to Wiriamu Mineruva 2); 18. "Prepared" (覚悟, Kakugo); 19. "Doomed" (アウト, Auto; lit. 'Out' in English); 20. "Alliance" ("共闘", Kyōtō); 21. "Blatant Trap" (見え透いた罠, Miesuita wana); 22. "Bait" (餌, Esa); 23. "Destroy!" (ブチ壊せ!, Buchikowase!!); 24. "Inspection, Part 1" (下見①, Shitami 1); 25. "Inspection, Part 2" (下見②, Shitami 2)
Norman, Emma and Ray discover books donated by William Minerva contain Morse code. They continue with their escape plan which is discovered by Krone who offers a deal with the children to replace Isabella as Mom. However, Isabella strikes first and she has Krone eliminated and breaks Emma's leg to prevent her escaping.
4	I Want to Live; Ikitai (生きたい)	July 4, 2017; 978-4-08-881183-3	June 5, 2018; 978-1-4215-9715-7
26. "I Want to Live" (生きたい, Ikitai); 27. "Won't Let You Die" (死なせない, Shinasenai); 28. "Concealment, Part 1" (潜伏, Senpuku); 29. "Concealment, Part 2" (潜伏②, Senpuku 2); 30. "Resistance" (抵抗, Teikō); 31. "Emptiness" (空虚, Kūkyo); 32. "Action, Part 1" (決行①, Kekkō 1); 33. "Action, Part 2" (決行②, Kekkō 2); 34. "Action, Part 3" (決行③, Kekkō 3)
Norman is shipped out, but not before he meticulously prepares an escape plan for Emma.
5	Escape; Dasshutsu (脱出)	September 4, 2017; 978-4-08-881205-2	August 7, 2018; 978-1-4215-9716-4
35. "Action, Part 4" (決行④, Kekkō 4); 36. "Action, Part 5" (決行⑤, Kekkō 5); 37. "Escape" (脱出, Dasshutsu); 38. "Forest of Vows" (誓いの森, Chikai no mori); 39. "Beyond Expectations" (想定外, Sōtei-gai); 40. "The Snakes of Alvapinera" (アルヴァピンネラの蛇, Aruvapin'nera no hebi); 41. "Attack" (襲来, Shūrai); 42. "We Won't Be Eaten" (食われてたまるか, Kuwarete tamaru ka); 43. "81194" (81194)
Two months later, the children implement their escape plan with the fifteen older ones escaping over the wall and into the forest. The children are beset by dangers, and one day they are saved by a hooded woman called Mujika.
6	B06-32	November 2, 2017; 978-4-08-881278-6	October 2, 2018; 978-1-9747-0147-6
44. "The Girl in the Hood" (頭巾の少女, Zukin no Shōjo); 45. "The Rescue" (救援, Kyūen); 46. "Sonju and Mujika" (ソンジュとムジカ, Sonju to Mujika); 47. "An Old Tale" (昔話, Mukashi-banashi); 48. "The Two Worlds" (二つの世界, Futatsu no sekai); 49. "Teach Me" (教えて, Oshiete); 50. "Friends" (友達, Tomodachi); 51. "B06-32, Part 1" (B06-32 ①); 52. "B06-32, Part 2" (B06-32 ②)
The demons, Mujika and Sonju, save and shelter the children from demons. Emma and Ray learn more about the demon world and the "Promise" made with the all-powerful, "Him". They part eventually and find refuge in the wasteland at Minerva's sanctuary at B06-32.
7	Decision; Handan (判断)	January 4, 2018; 978-4-08-881323-3	December 4, 2018; 978-1-9747-0224-4
53. "B06-32, Part 3" (B06-32 ③); 54. "B06-32, Part 4" (B06-32 ④); 55. "B06-32, Part 5" (B06-32 ⑤); 56. "A Deal, Part 1" (取り引き①, Torihiki 1); 57. "A Deal, Part 2" (取り引き②, Torihiki 2); 58. "Decision" (判断, Handan); 59. "Choose Your Weapon" (好きに選ベ, Suki ni erabe); 60. "Goldy Pond" (ゴールディ・ポンド, Gōrudi pondo); 61. "Try Surviving" (生きてをする, Ikite o suru)
The children meet an unnamed man who escaped from Glory Bell 13. He agrees to help them reach a human settlement at Goldy Pond village, but on the way they are attacked by demons.
8	The Forbidden Game; Kinjirareta asobi (禁じられた遊び)	April 4, 2018; 978-4-08-881384-4	February 5, 2019; 978-1-9747-0229-9
62. "Indestructible Monsters" (不死身の怪物, Fujimi no kaibutsu); 63. "Help" (ヘルプ, Herupu; lit. 'Help' in English); 64. "Could Have Been Me" (もしもの私, Moshi-mo no watashi); 65. "The Secret Garden" (シークレット・ガーデン, Shīkuretto gāden; lit. 'Secret Garden' in English); 66. "The Forbidden Game, Part 1" (禁じられた遊び①, Kinjirareta asobi ①); 67. "The Forbidden Game, Part 2" (禁じられた遊び②, Kinjirareta asobi ②); 68. "This Is How It Is" (こんなもんだよ, Konna mon da yo); 69. "Introduction" (会わせたい人, Awasetai hito); 70. "Hide-and-Seek" (かくれんぼ, Kakurenbo)
Goldy Pond is revealed as a top secret hunting ground run by Archduke Lewis where demons hunt human children for pleasure. While being hunted, Emma meets a resistance group led by Oliver and Lucas.
9	The Battle Begins; Kaisen (開戦)	June 4, 2018; 978-4-08-881495-7	April 2, 2019; 978-1-9747-0487-3
71. "Real Intentions" (真意, Shin'i); 72. "Call"; 73. "Uprising" (決起, Kekki); 74. "A Special Child" (特別な子, Tokubetsu na ko); 75. "Unyielding Reed" (不屈の葦, Fukutsu no ashi); 76. "The Battle Begins" (開戦, Kaisen); 77. "The Foolish Weaklings" (無知な雑魚共, Muchi na zako-domo); 78. "One Down" (まず一匹, Mazu ippiki); 79. "Everything Put in This One Shot" (この一矢に定むべし, Kono hito-ya ni sadamubeshi)
Emma and Ray learn more about demon society and they join with the human resistance fighters to kill the demon hunters; Lewis, Bayon, Nous & Nouma.
10	Rematch; Ritān matchi (リターンマッチ)	August 3, 2018; 978-4-08-881534-3	June 4, 2019; 978-1-9747-0498-9
80. "You Have No Right!!" (何だよ お前!!, Nanda yo omae!!); 81. "Defend to the Death" (死守, Shishu); 82. "Master of the Hunting Ground" (猟場の主, Kariniwa no aruji); 83. "Answer After 13 Years" (13年越しの解答, Jūsan-nen-goshi no kaitō); 84. "The Brakes" (歯止め, Hadome); 85. "What Do I...?" (どうしたら, Dō shitara); 86. "Firepower" (戦力, Senryoku); 87. "Boundary" (境界, Kekkai); 88. "Rematch" (リターンマッチ, Ritān matchi) lit. 'Return Match' in English
The battle continues between the human resistance and the powerful demon hunters with successes and losses on both sides.
11	The End; Ketchaku (決着)	November 2, 2018; 978-4-08-881622-7	August 6, 2019; 978-1-9747-0838-3
89. "Convening" (合流, Gōryū); 90. "Let's Win" (勝とう, Katō); 91. "All We've Got" (ありったけを, Arittake o); 92. "Fire Away" (撃ちまくれ, Uchimakure); 93. "The End" (決着, Ketchaku); 94. "All of Us, Alive" (全員 生きて, Zen'in ikite); 95. "Let's Go Home" (帰ろうぜ, Kaerō ze); 96. "Welcome Home" (おかえり, O-kaeri); 97. "The Future You Want" (望む未来, Nozomu mirai)
The human resistance group manages to defeat the demon hunters and destroy Goldy Pond. Emma vows to rescue children from all the farms, reforge a new Promise with "Him" and cross into the human world.
12	Starting Sound; Hajimari no oto (始まりの音)	January 4, 2019; 978-4-08-881692-0	October 1, 2019; 978-1-9747-0888-8
98. "Starting Sound" (始まりの音, Hajimari no oto); 99. "Cuvitidala" (クヴィティダラ, Kuvitidara); 100. "Arrival" (到着, Tōchaku); 101. "Come" (おいで, Oide); 102. "Found It" (見つけたよ, Mitsuketa yo); 103. "One More Move" (あと一手, Ato itte); 104. "Abandon" (捨てる, Suteru); 105. "Illusion" (まやかし, Mayakashi); 106. "The Way Out" (活路, Katsuro)
More is revealed about the history of the separation between the demon and human worlds and the agreement with "Him" called "The Promise". Human soldiers led by Andrew attack the shelter, and Lucas and the man revealed as Yuugo stay to defend.
13	The King of Paradise; Rakuen no Ō (楽園の王)	March 4, 2019; 978-4-08-881754-5	January 7, 2020; 978-1-9747-0889-5
107. "Makes Me Sick" (反吐が出る, Hedo ga deru); 108. "You're Not Going Anywhere" (行かせねぇ, Ikasenē); 109. "Keep Going" (進め, Susume); 110. "What I Can Do" (すべきこと, Subeki koto); 111. "Unwanted Guest" (望まざる客, Nozomazaru kyaku); 112. "Mourning" (追悼, Tsuitō); 113. "The King of Paradise" (楽園の王, Rakuen no ō); 114. "One at a Time" (一つずつ, Hitotsu zutsu); 115. "Jin and Hayato" (ジンとハヤト, Jin to Hayato)
Lucas and Yuugo die while enabling all the children to escape. The wounded leader Andrew tracks down the children and kills three of them before being eaten by a demon. While searching for the "Jaw of the Lion", Emma and Ray meet Jin and Hayato who claim to be Minerva's servants.
14	Encounter; Kaikō (邂逅)	June 4, 2019; 978-4-08-881861-0	March 3, 2020; 978-1-9747-1016-4
116. "Breaking into the Cage, Part 1" (檻への侵入①, Ori e no shin'nyū ①); 117. "Breaking into the Cage, Part 2" (檻への侵入②, Ori e no shin'nyū ②); 118. "Meeting" (対面, Taimen); 119. "Encounter" (邂逅, Kaikō); 120. "Monsters Without Shape" (形のない怪物, Katachi no nai kaibutsu); 121. "Isn't This Great" (よかったね, Yokatta ne); 122. "True Feelings" (本心, Honshin); 123. "An Important Choice" (大事な選択, Daiji na sentaku); 124. "Tell Us" (聞かせろよ, Kika Seroyo)
The children meet Norman who is still alive, and says he is Minerva. He tells his story of escape from the experimental farm Lambda 7214. Norman plans to kill all demons but Emma wants to find a way in which humans and demons can co-exist.
15	Welcome to the Entrance "Iriguchi" e Yōkoso ("入口"へようこそ)	August 2, 2019; 978-4-08-882017-0	June 2, 2020; 978-1-9747-1499-5
125. "Alliance of Liars" (嘘吐きの同盟, Usotsuki no Dōmei); 126. "A Three-Person Talk" (鼎談, Teidan); 127. "Confrontation" (対立, Tairitsu); 128. "I've Decided" (決めた, Kimeta); 129. "My Burden" (背負うべきもの, Seoubeki Mono); 130. "Something to Report" (報告, Hōkoku); 131. "Welcome to the Entrance" ("入口"へようこそ, "Iriguchi" e Yōkoso); 132. "Punitive Expedition" (誅伐, Chūbatsu); 133. "Let's Play" (あそぼ, Asobo)
Norman plans a massacre of the demon royal family and nobility, but Emma and Ray decide to find "Him" via the secret of the Seven Walls at Khavitidala. Norman launches his assault on the demon capital.
16	Lost Boy	October 4, 2019; 978-4-08-882077-4	August 4, 2020; 978-1-9747-1701-9
134. "Lost Boy"; 135. "The Search" (捜索, Sōsaku); 136. "Maze" (迷路, Meiro); 137. "Conversion" (変換, Henkan); 138. "Demon Search, Part 1" (鬼探し①, Oni Sagashi ①); 139. "Demon Search, Part 2" (鬼探し②, Oni Sagashi ②); 140. "I'm Here!" (来たよ！, Kita yo!); 141. "The Promise Made 1,000 Years Ago, Part 1" (1000年前の"約束"①, Sennen mae no yakusoku 1); 142. "The Promise Made 1,000 Years Ago, Part 2" (1000年前の"約束"②, Sennen mae no yakusoku 2); 143. "Eliminate" (抹殺, Massatsu)
Emma meets "Him" and offers to reforge the Promise in exchange for a reward. Norman pressures Don and Gilda search for Mujika and Sonju whose special blood will enable demons to survive without eating humans.
17	The Imperial Capital Battle; Ōto kessen (王都決戦)	January 4, 2020; 978-4-08-882170-2	November 3, 2020; 978-1-9747-1814-6
144. "Help Us" (助けて, Tasukete); 145. "Respective Reasons" (それぞれの, Sorezore no); 146. "The Imperial Capital Battle" (王都決戦, Ōto kessen); 147. "Accumulated Grievances" (積怨, Sekien); 148. "I'm Coming" (今行くよ, Ima iku yo); 149. "Duty to Attest" (証明する義務, Shōmei suru gimu); 150. "Vow of 700 Years" (700年の悲願, 700-Nen no higan); 151. "The Ones to Win" (勝つのは, Katsu no wa); 152. "Time" (刻限, Kokugen)
Norman's group poisons the demon capital's water supply while his demon allies attack the royal family in revenge for the ostricisation of their clan. Queen Legravalima survives, but is cut to pieces by Zazie of Norman's Lambda group.
18	Never Be Alone	March 4, 2020; 978-4-08-882223-5	January 5, 2021; 978-1-9747-1978-5
153. "Coward" (臆病, Okubyō); 154. "A Breakthrough" (突破口, Toppakō); 155. "Resurgence" (復活, Fukkatsu); 156. "Let's End This" (終わりにしましょう, Owari ni shimashō); 157. "The World Is Mine"; 158. "The Reason I Was Born" (生まれてきた意味, Umarete kita imi); 159. "Thank You" (ありがとう, Arigatō); 160. "Shackles" (足枷, Ashikase); 161. "Never Be Alone"
Norman finally agrees with Emma and to end the extermination of demons against the wishes of his Lambda supporters. The demon Queen Legravalima re-emerges in a faceless form but is eventually destroyed by Sonju. Meanwhile, the human enforcer of the Promise, Peter Ratri, uses demon forces to capture all the free children.
19	Perfect Scores; Manten (満点)	July 3, 2020; 978-4-08-882223-5	May 4, 2021; 978-1-9747-2183-2
162. "Musical Chairs" (玉座盗りゲーム, Isu tori gēmu); 163. "Reversal" (反転, Hanten); 164. "The Smiling Devil" (笑顔の悪魔, Egao no akuma); 165. "You Can Fly!"; 166. "Going Back Home" (ゴーバックホーム, Gō Bakku Hōmu; lit. 'Go Back Home' in English); 167. "This Way, Demons" (鬼さんこちら, Onisan kochira); 168. "Dad" (創造主(パパ), Papa; lit. 'Papa' in French); 169. "Perfect Scores" (満点, Manten); 170. "Together" (共に, Tomoni); 171. "Defeat" (敗北, Haiboku)
Peter Ratri plans to replace the special farms with farms dedicated solely to breeding humans for food. Norman's armed Lambda youths attack Ratri and the demons which have gone to the Grace Field complex. Isabella and a group of armed Moms side with the children, and Ratri tries to escape. Meanwhile, as Sonju and Mujika are about to be executed for treason, Archduke Leuvis arrives and reveals that Sonju's blood is their salvation.
20	Beyond Destiny; Unmei no Mukōgishi (運命の向こう岸)	October 2, 2020; 978-4-08-882375-1	August 3, 2021; 978-1-9747-2186-3
172. "Free" (自由, Jiyū); 173. "Prisoners"; 174. "A New World, Part 1" (新しい世界①, Atarashii Sekai ①); 175. "A New World, Part 2" (新しい世界②, Atarashii Sekai ②); 176. "We're Home!" (ただいま!, Tadaima!); 177. "Mother" (母親, Hahaoya); 178. "To the Human World" (人間の世界へ, Ningen no Sekai e); 179. "Compensation" (代償, Daishō); 180. "Your Everything" (きみのすべて, Kimi no Subete); 181. "Beyond Destiny" (運命の向こう岸, Unmei no Mukōgishi)
Rather than lose to Emma, Peter Ratri kills himself. Emma vows to join the human world and the Moms decide to join them. Suddenly, a disgruntled demon attacks Emma, and Isabella sacrifices her life to save her. According to the new Promise, the children are transported to the human world and are welcomed by Mike Ratri. However, as the price for the Promise, Emma is sent to another part of the human world, but with no memory of her past or her "family". Fortunately, Norman, Ray and the others eventually find her, and although she does not recognise them, they all decide to live together.

== Related volume ==
No.	Title	Original release date	English release date
1	Kaiu Shirai x Posuka Demizu: Beyond The Promised Neverland; Shirai kaiu × Demizu posuka Tanhenshū (白井カイウ×出水ぽすか短編集)	September 3, 2021; 978-4-08-882781-0	November 8, 2022; 978-1-9747-3471-9
1. "Poppy's Wish" (ポピィの願い); 2. "Takashi and Poppy" (タカシとポピー); 3. "Spirit Photographer Saburo Kono" (心霊写真師 鴻野三郎); 4. "Dreams Come True" (夢が叶う); 5. "We Were Born" (私たちは生まれました); 6. "DC3" (DC3デイーシースリー)
A collection of six one-shot stories written by Kaiu Shirai and illustrated by Posuka Demizu including two side stories from The Promised Neverland, "Dreams Come True" and "We Were Born", which previously were not collected in any volume.

== Side stories not yet collected in volumes ==
- "The First Shot" – Published on October 5, 2020
- "Seeking the Sky of Freedom" – Published on December 7, 2020
- "A Mother's Determination" – Published on December 14, 2020
- "Undying Blade" – Published on August 24, 2026
