= List of The Promised Neverland characters =

Some of the characters of the series, including children and staff from Grace Field House and demons from behind. From left to right: Norman, Emma, Phil, Ray (bottom), Isabella and Mujika

The Promised Neverland manga series features an extensive cast of characters created by Kaiu Shirai and Posuka Demizu.

== Conception and creation ==
The author, Kaiu Shirai wanted to create "upbeat and hopeful" characters to echo those heroes from Weekly Shōnen Jump's series. He stated that Emma is the epitome of the positive attitude, Norman is the mainstay of the group and Ray has an opposite and darker personality. Originally, Emma was a less decisive and active character, Norman had a "lighter" mood, and Ray was "more extreme", but Shirai and the series' editor, Suguru Sugita, decided to tweak the characters' traits and personalities, something that, according to Sugita, continued as the series progressed. Sugita thought that a female main character would not be popular enough to be serialized in a shōnen magazine and suggested Shirai to change the character setting, making a version where Emma was a boy, but it did not work out. Sugita later considered that since Studio Ghibli films, which feature female protagonists supported by male characters, are widely popular across the world, they thought that having a female main character would not be a problem. According to Shirai, the choice of having Emma as the main character in the manga series, was mainly due that he was more interested in exploring a mother-daughter opposition rather than a mother-son opposition. He added that, as a girl, Emma has the choice to become a "Mom" or to try to run away, and to Shirai that was more interesting in terms of the storyline.

Shirai created a base of drawings with images and expressions of each character and the artist of the manga, Posuka Demizu, fine-tuned their features and attitudes. Demizu alternated two styles of drawing for children and demons. She enjoyed drawing both, as children reminded her of the period when she was doing illustrations and the demons came out of personal taste for "all that is fantastic and scary". Demizu has also designed monsters for video games. According to Shirai, they were about it very early to imagine the design of the demons and the new characters, to have time to think about it well and to not be rushed by the rhythm of weekly publication. Demizu, nevertheless, had the characters ready in one or two days, as Shirai mentioned as example that the design of Sonju's horse was conceived, produced and validated in one day. Shirai emphasized that he rarely had seen someone as fast and confident as Demizu.

== Main characters ==
Emma (エマ, Ema)
Voiced by: Sumire Morohoshi (Japanese); Erica Mendez (English)
Portrayed by: Minami Hamabe

Emma is an 11-year-old girl. She is 1.45m, like Norman, at the beginning of the manga and anime (as said in the first manga). Emma is N° 63194. She is one of the oldest orphans living in Grace Field House. She has a much more optimistic and positive personality than Norman and Ray. Furthermore, she is frequently getting full scores of 300 points in her daily tests and her athleticism is high, but she wants to keep up with her performances. Her hair is a short orange hair, with two strands of hair flying from the top of her head. She tends to be idealistic, and she strives to make the practically impossible possible. She also loves her family more than anything. Emma is especially well-liked in the house, where she plays and cares for the younger children. After learning the truth, she teamed up with her brothers and sisters to escape from the house with fourteen other children.

Ray (レイ, Rei)
Voiced by: Mariya Ise (Japanese); Laura Stahl (English)
Portrayed by: Kairi Jo

Ray is an 11-year-old boy living in Grace Field House. He is 1.50m at the beginning of the manga and anime (as said in the first manga). Ray is N° 81194. He is a pragmatic person, he often gets full scores on the daily tests of the orphanage, and is a knowledgeable reader. He was later told by Emma and Norman about the escape plan from the house, but in fact, he knew about the truth and the identity of the house from a young age. Likewise, he was secretly working as a spy for his mother, Isabella. Not only that, but he had a deal with her as a collaborator, bringing to her the latest informations about the whole family. But he demanded a reward for each task he did, to prepare a strategy in the shadow. In fact, he does not like studying or reading that much, but he persevered in studying and reading in order to maximize his own worth, to be the special merchandise of the house. At first, he gives up on infants and insists that only the elders escape, but since Emma does not want to leave anyone behind, he was convinced and he cooperated. However, when they succeed in escaping from the house, he vows to protect his family in the future. He is Isabella's biological son. She learned that Ray is her own son when he always sang Leslie's song that he heard while he was in her womb. Since at the age of six, when he first hummed Leslie's song, he is shown to have a beautiful voice.

Norman (ノーマン, Nōrman)
Voiced by: Maaya Uchida (Japanese); Jeannie Tirado (English)
Portrayed by: Rihito Itagaki

Norman is one of the oldest orphans living in Grace Field House. He is 1.45m, like Emma, at the beginning of the manga and anime (as said in the first manga). Norman is N° 22194. He is an 11-year-old boy. His tests are always full scores. He aimed to escape from the house in cooperation with Emma and Ray. He had a kind personality, agreeing with Emma's plan to escape with everyone, even though he thought it was close to impossible. Furthermore, he is the most rational among children and is also excellent at psychological bargaining. Suddenly, it was decided that he would be shipped from the orphanage before his 12th birthday. Emma and the others thought he had died, but when Norman was shipped, Peter Ratri appeared as his foster parent, and was sent to a new plantation called Lambda Λ7214 to be eaten by the queen. He also lived with other edible children in a huge tree that was once said to have been inhabited by demons, and used the name of Minerva to guide Emma and the others to him.

== Grace Field House ==
Isabella (イザベラ, Izabera)
Voiced by: Yūko Kaida (Japanese); Laura Post (English)
Portrayed by: Keiko Kitagawa
Known to the orphanage's children as their "Mom", Isabella is a 31-year-old woman who takes care of everyone there. She has fair-skin, purple eyes, and long dark brown hair tied into a low bun. Isabella was born and raised at Grace Field House where she lived a happy life until her crush, Leslie, was shipped out, which brought her intense grief. Shortly after Leslie's departure, Isabella discovered that something was wrong with the orphanage when she tried to run away, and found that her 'orphanage' was bordered by a cliff that surrounded it as far as she could see . Her 'mom', Sarah, convinced her that escaping was impossible and that the best life she could strive for was becoming a 'mom' to other children at the orphanage. When Isabella was shipped out at the age of 12, she was presumably told the entire truth and began her training to become a 'mom' at Grace Field Headquarters and was eventually put in charge of Plant 3. While appearing extremely loving and affectionate to the children, she is actually very manipulative, cunning, and seems, at first glance, totally detached to their tragic fate. Later it is revealed that she is Ray's biological mother, and, because of thinking that escape is impossible, she tries to give all the children the happiest life possible before they are shipped out. She is kept alive after the children's escape due to her massive skills and brainpower and offered the position of Grandma, with the former having been blamed for the escape instead. She takes the position, but only in order to help the children when they inevitably come back to rescue their younger siblings.

Krone (クローネ, Kurōne)
Voiced by: Nao Fujita (Japanese); Rebeka Thomas (English)
Portrayed by: Naomi Watanabe
Known to the children as "Sister Krone", Krone is a 26-year-old woman who was introduced suddenly to help Isabella run the orphanage and aim to become a mom. She is a tall, muscular, and intimidating woman. She has short poofy black hair with brown eyes, plump lips, and dark skin. While Krone's current position provides her a good life, she yearns to usurp her position and become the next 'Mom' of Grace Field House. Like Isabella, she was born and raised at Grace Field House, and is extremely cunning, manipulative on the inside, while harboring an affectionate and warm exterior. Krone's sole difference from Isabella is her intense aggression, which matches her large and intimidating physique. Originally intending to cause a scandal by helping the children escape and framing Isabella, she leaks information to Norman and Emma on several occasions, but is ultimately killed by Isabella and 'Grandma', who were in cahoots the whole time. Before she died, she left Norman a Promised Pen from an ally named William Minerva as a show of her last struggle against death.

Don (ドン, Don)
Voiced by: Shinei Ueki (Japanese); Cedric Williams (English)
Portrayed by: Soma Santoki
Don is a 10-year-old boy living at Grace Field House. He has dark skin, black eyes, short messy black hair, and a rather tall stature. Don is rowdy, talkative, and fun-loving. He is also shown to be somewhat competitive and he cares deeply for his family. He and Gilda are the first two kids Emma, Ray, and Norman recruit for planning out the escape. He escaped the house along with the rest of his siblings who were over the age of 5.

Gilda (ギルダ, Giruda)
Voiced by: Lynn (Japanese); Ryan Bartley (English)
Portrayed by: Miyu Ando
Gilda is a 10-year-old girl living at Grace Field House. She has brown eyes, short, straight olive hair styled into a bob, and wears round glasses. Gilda is known to be calm, quiet, and shy, but also highly observant. She has great insight and makes level-headed decisions. Together with Emma, Gilda helps take care of the younger children and babies at the house. She escaped the house along with the rest of her siblings who were over the age of 5.

Nat (ナット, Natto)
Voiced by: Shizuka Ishigami (Japanese); Michelle Ruff (English)
Portrayed by: Fuga Shibazaki
Nat is a 9-year-old boy living at Grace Field House. He has short auburn hair, brown eyes, and a tall nose line. Nat is a jovial and slightly narcissistic boy who enjoys playing songs for his siblings on the piano. He is also shown to be somewhat cowardly at times. He escaped the house along with the rest of his siblings who were over the age of 5.

Anna (アンナ, An'na)
Voiced by: Ai Kayano (Japanese); Brianna Knickerbocker (English)
Portrayed by: Leilani Akimoto
Anna is a 9-year-old girl living at Grace Field House. She has blue eyes and long, straight blonde hair tied into twin braids. Anna is a bright and gentle girl who loves her family dearly. Despite her quiet nature, she is strong-willed and is kind to everyone. She escaped the house along with the rest of her siblings who were over the age of 5.

Lannion (ラニオン, Ranion)
Voiced by: Yūko Mori (Japanese); Philece Sampler (English)
Portrayed by: Kousei Kimura
Lannion is a 7-year-old boy living at Grace Field House. He is missing a tooth and has blue eyes, freckles, and short blonde hair styled into a single spike that resembles an onion. Lannion is best friends with Thoma and together the two enjoy pulling pranks and getting into mischief. He escaped the house along with the rest of his siblings who were over the age of 5.

Thoma (トーマ, Tōma)
Voiced by: Mari Hino (Japanese); Cristina Vee (English)
Portrayed by: Motota Mizoguchi
Thoma is a 7-year-old boy with living at Grace Field House. He is missing a tooth and has grey monolid eyes and short black hair which sticks up in three oval sections at the top right side and the bottom left side of his head. Thoma is best friends with Lannion and together the two enjoy pulling pranks and getting into mischief. He escaped the house along with the rest of his siblings who were over the age of 5.

Conny (コニー, Konī)
Voiced by: Ari Ozawa (Japanese); Jackie Lastra (English)
Portrayed by: Asada Halo
Conny was a 6-year-old girl who formerly resided at Grace Field House. She had blue eyes and blonde hair styled into pigtails. She was especially close with Don and was notable for always carrying her favorite stuffed toy, Little Bunny, around with her. She was shipped in October 2045. Upon her death, Conny's body was discovered by Norman and Emma, letting them realize the truth behind the orphanage.

Dominic (ドミニク, Dominiku)
Voiced by: Mari Hino (Japanese); Janice Kawaye (English)
Portrayed by: Adinan
Dominic is a 6-year-old boy living at Grace Field House. He has tan skin, short white hair, and big brown eyes. Dominic is an active boy who escaped the house along with the rest of his siblings who were over the age of 5.

Yvette (イベット, Ibetto)
Voiced by: Nao Shiraki (Japanese); Cristina Vee (English)
Portrayed by: Girard Sara
Yvette is a 5-year-old girl living at Grace Field House. She has long, shaggy black hair and brown eyes. Yvette is an artist who escaped the house along with the rest of her siblings who were over the age of 5.

Chris (クリス, Kurisu) / Christie (クリスティー, Kurisutī)
Voiced by: Hiyori Kono (Japanese); Janice Kawaye (English)
Portrayed by: Rupert Palmer
Chris, also referred to as "Christie", is a 5-year-old boy living at Grace Field House. He has short, spiky dark blue hair and blue eyes. Chris is full of curiosity and escaped the house along with the rest of his siblings who were over the age of 5. Chris spends most of the second half of the story in a coma due to being shot in the head by Andrew and his team when they raided the shelter.

Mark (マルク, Maruku)
Voiced by: Yoshino Aoyama (Japanese); Erika Harlacher (English)
Portrayed by: Kit Furuhashi
Mark is a 5-year-old boy living at Grace Field House. He is slightly overweight and has short brown hair styled into a bowl-cut and blue eyes. Mark loves to eat and escaped the house along with the rest of his siblings who were over the age of 5.

Jemima (ジェミマ, Jemima)
Voiced by: Erisa Kuon (Japanese); Kimberley Anne Campbell (English)
Portrayed by: Ariana
Jemima is a 5-year-old girl living at Grace Field House. She has dark skin, brown eyes, and dark brown hair slicked back into a low bun. Jemima is a diligent straight shooter who escaped the house along with the rest of her siblings who were over the age of 5.

Alicia (アリシア, Arishia)
Voiced by: Yoshino Aoyama (Japanese); Brianna Knickerbocker (English)
Portrayed by: Misora Shimura
Alicia is a 5-year-old girl living at Grace Field House. She has blonde hair tied back into a high ponytail and light brown eyes. Alicia is a tomboy who escaped the house along with the rest of her siblings who were over the age of 5.

Rossi (ロッシ一, Rosshi)
Voiced by: Coco Hayashi (Japanese); Allegra Clark (English)
Rossi is a 5-year-old boy living at Grace Field House. He has fair skin, short white hair, and small green eyes. Rossi is a delicate, cautious, and prudent boy who escaped the house along with the rest of his siblings who were over the age of 5.

Phil (フィル, Firu)
Voiced by: Hiyori Kono (Japanese); Amber Connor (English)
Portrayed by: Yurito Mori
Phil is a 4-year-old boy who is considered to be the smartest out of all the 4-year-olds living at Grace Field House. He has tan skin, short black hair, and big blue eyes. He is highly observant and figured out the truth behind the orphanage simply by studying other characters words and behaviors. However, he said nothing about it in case his hypothesis was wrong. He leads all the children ages 4 and younger to stay back in the orphanage, while all the children ages 5 and older make their escape.

Sherry (シェリー, Sherī) / Shelly (シェリー, Sherī)
Voiced by: Erisa Kuon (Japanese); Philece Sampler (English)
Portrayed by: Shizuku Ota
Sherry, also referred to as "Shelly", is a 4-year-old girl living at Grace Field House. She has light skin, freckles, blue eyes, and shoulder-length light orange hair with a red hair band. Sherry is a fashionable girl who loves Norman and is close to Phil. She was left behind with the younger children at Grace Field House, while the children over 5 years old made their escape.

Marnya (マーニャ, Mānya)
Voiced by: Erisa Kuon
Portrayed by: Sayuki Miyajima
Marnya is a 4-year-old girl living at Grace Field House. She has brown eyes and short, brown hair styled into pigtails. Marnya loves her 'Mom', Isabella. She was left behind with the younger children at Grace Field House, while the children over 5 years old made their escape.

Naila (ナイラ, Naira)
Voiced by: Yūko Mori (Japanese); Cristina Vee (English)
Portrayed by: Domerichi Eden Kina
Naila is a 4-year-old girl living at Grace Field House. She has brown eyes and dark blonde hair tied into a high ponytail. Naila goes at her own pace and is good friends with Mark. She was left behind with the younger children at Grace Field House, while the children over 5 years old made their escape.

Hans (ハンス, Hanzu)
Portrayed by: Touma H
Hans is a 4-year-old boy living at Grace Field House. He has short, light brown hair with a square face, an upturned nose, and slanted eyes. Hans is a gleeful boy who was left behind with the younger children at Grace Field House, while the children over 5 years old made their escape.

Jasper (ジャスパー, Jasupā)
Portrayed by: Haruka Sato
Jasper is a 4-year-old boy living at Grace Field House. He has short blonde hair and light green eyes. Jasper is a sleepyhead who was left behind with the younger children at Grace Field House, while the children over 5 years old made their escape.

Dahlia (ダリア, Daria)
Dahlia is a 3-year-old girl living at Grace Field House. She has green eyes and messy auburn hair tied into a single braid. Dahlia is a cheerful girl who cherishes her family. She was left behind with the younger children at Grace Field House, while the children over 5 years old made their escape.

Vivian (ビビアン, Bibian)
Voiced by: Erika Harlacher
Portrayed by: Dahlia N
Vivian is a 3-year-old girl living at Grace Field House. She has short brown hair styled into a bob and small, green crossed eyes. Vivian is a quiet girl who was left behind with the younger children at Grace Field House, while the children over 5 years old made their escape.

Chamberlain (チェンバレン, Chenbaren)
Voiced by: Nao Shiraki (Japanese); Jackie Lastra (English)
Portrayed by: Nbaiare
Chamberlain is a 3-year-old boy living at Grace Field House. He has dark skin, oval-shaped black eyes and black curly hair. Chamberlain often has flashes of wit. He was left behind with the younger children at Grace Field House, while the children over 5 years old made their escape.

Eugene (エゥゲン, Eugen)
Voiced by: Coco Hayashi (Japanese); Janice Roman Roku (English)
Eugene is a 3-year-old boy living at Grace Field House. He has short brown hair with long bangs covering his eyes. Eugene is a thoughtful boy who was left behind with the younger children at Grace Field House, while the children over 5 years old made their escape.

Tom (トム, Tomu)
Voiced by: Erisa Kuon
Portrayed by: Ishizuka Rikuto
Tom is a 3-year-old boy living at Grace Field House. He has light brown hair that sticks up and slanted eyes. Tom is a carefree boy who was left behind with the younger children at Grace Field House, while the children over 5 years old made their escape.

Damdin (ダムディン, Damudin)
Voiced by: Coco Hayashi (Japanese); Michelle Ruff (English)
Portrayed by: Svediozas
Damdin is a 3-year-old boy living at Grace Field House. He has dark blue eyes and short curly black hair. Damdin is a boy who wakes up early. He was left behind with the younger children at Grace Field House, while the children over 5 years old made their escape.

Nina (ニーナ, Nīna)
Voiced by: Yoshino Aoyama (Japanese); Erika Harlacher (English)
Portrayed by: Risa Kaneko
Nina is a 3-year-old girl living at Grace Field House. She has oval-shaped brown eyes and short blonde hair styled into a bob. Nina is a determined girl who was left behind with the younger children at Grace Field House, while the children over 5 years old made their escape.

Charlie (チャーリー, Chārī)
Charlie is a 2-year-old boy living at Grace Field House. He has short silver hair, oval-shaped brown eyes, and a large, rounded nose. He sleeps in Isabella's room. Charlie was left behind with the younger children at Grace Field House, while the children over 5 years old made their escape. He is first shown in chapter 100.

Mike (マイク, Maiku)
Mike is a 2-year-old boy living at Grace Field House. He has shaved dark gray hair and slanted eyes. He sleeps in Isabella's room. Mike was left behind with the younger children at Grace Field House, while the children over 5 years old made their escape.

Gray-haired girl (白髪の少女, Shiraga no shōjo)
Gray-haired girl is a placeholder name for an unnamed 2-year-old girl living at Grace Field House. She has shoulder-length gray hair and gray eyes. She sleeps in Isabella's room. She was left behind with the younger children at Grace Field House, while the children over 5 years old made their escape.

Brown-haired girl (茶髪の女の子, Chapatsu no on'nanoko)
Brown-haired girl is a placeholder name for an unnamed 2-year-old girl living at Grace Field House. She has straight light brown hair and brown eyes. She sleeps in Isabella's room. She was left behind with the younger children at Grace Field House, while the children over 5 years old made their escape.

Light brown-haired boy (薄茶色の髪の少年, Usu chairo no kami no shōnen)
Light brown-haired boy is a placeholder name for an unnamed 2-year-old boy living at Grace Field House. He has short light brown hair and dark brown eyes. He sleeps in Isabella's room. He was left behind with the younger children at Grace Field House, while the children over 5 years old made their escape.

Dark brown-haired boy (濃い茶色の髪の少年, Koi chairo no kami no shōnen)
Dark brown-haired boy is a placeholder name for an unnamed 2-year-old boy living at Grace Field House. He has short dark brown hair and slanted eyes. He sleeps in Isabella's room. He was left behind with the younger children at Grace Field House, while the children over 5 years old made their escape.

Blonde-haired boy (ブロンドの髪の少年, Burondo no kami no shōnen)
Blonde-haired boy is a placeholder name for an unnamed 2-year-old boy living at Grace Field House. He has short dark blonde hair and oval-shaped brown eyes. He sleeps in Isabella's room. He was left behind with the younger children at Grace Field House, while the children over 5 years old made their escape.

Milly (ミリー, Mirī)
Milly is a 1-year-old girl living at Grace Field House. She has short light hair and slanted eyes. Milly was left behind with the younger children at Grace Field House, while the children over 5 years old made their escape. She is first shown in chapter 100. She only appears in the manga.

Carol (キャロル, Kyaroru)
Portrayed by: Poésie Yano
Carol is a 1-year-old girl living at Grace Field House. She has short, unruly orange hair and light blue eyes. Carol is the newest child to arrive at the orphanage, replacing Conny. She was left behind with the younger children at Grace Field House, while the children over 5 years old made their escape.

Grandma (大母様(グランマ), Guranma) / Sarah (サラ, Sara)
Voiced by: Mami Koyama (Japanese); Philece Sampler (Credited as Dana Hayes) (English)
Portrayed by: Mita Yoshiko
Sarah, more commonly referred to as "Grandma", is an elderly woman and one of the highest-ranking humans working at Grace Field Headquarters. She has short and curly grey hair, a large rounded nose, wrinkles, and fairly plump lips. The upper part of her face is not shown. Part of her job is to train young girls to become moms and caretakers. Decades ago, Sarah once worked as a caretaker and 'mom' at Grace Field House in a plantation she was assigned to. Two of the notable children at her plantation were Isabella and Leslie. She considers Isabella one of her pawns.

Leslie (レスリー, Resurī)
Voiced by: Sanae Kobayashi (Japanese); Morgan Berry (English)
Leslie was a 12-year-old boy who formerly resided at Grace Field House. He was Isabella's childhood best friend and crush. He had light skin, freckles, light blue eyes, and short, uneven light purple hair. Leslie wrote a song that Isabella instantly fell in love with (in which she still hums occasionally). Isabella was left grief-stricken when Leslie was shipped off to be eaten.

Hao (いいです, Īdesu)
Hao was a 6-year-old boy who formerly resided at Grace Field House. He had short black hair parted down the middle and monolid eyes. He was shipped in August 2045. Hao was the child shipped before Conny.

Ceddy (セディ, Sedi) / Sadie (セイディ, Sadi)
Ceddy, also referred to as "Sadie", was a 6-year-old girl who formerly resided at Grace Field House. She had straight blonde shoulder-length hair. In some of her appearances, she appears to have freckles. She was shipped in May 2045. Ceddy was the child shipped before Hao.

James (ジェームズ, Jeimuzu)
James was a 7-year-old boy who formerly resided at Grace Field House. He was shipped in March 2045. James was the child shipped before Ceddy. He is only mentioned in the anime. (He is not to be confused with James Ratri.)

Gary (ゲイリー, Geirī)
Gary was a 7-year-old boy who formerly resided at Grace Field House. He was shipped in December 2044. Gary was the child shipped before James. He is only mentioned in the anime.

Marcus (マーカス, Mākasu)
Marcus was a 12-year-old boy who formerly resided at Grace Field House. He was 2 years older than Emma, Ray, and Norman. He had a round, smiling face with freckles, and blonde hair styled in several bangs. Marcus was a prankster, but mostly protective of his siblings. He was shipped in 2044 on his 12th birthday and was fed to the high-ranking demons in the Imperial Capital. Marcus was the child shipped before Gary. He appears in the first light novel and the omake.

Susan (スーザン, Sūzan)
Susan was a 12-year-old girl who formerly resided at Grace Field House. She was 2 years older than Emma, Ray, and Norman. She had fair skin and upper-back length black hair with middle parted bangs. She was especially close to Ray, and was the first person who Ray implied the truth of the orphanage to. She was shipped in 2044 on her 12th birthday only a week after the previous child, Jimmy, was shipped out. It was implied that Susan was shipped out to be the meal during the Tifari, and as such did not even get the option to train to become a Sister or Mama. Susan was the child shipped before Marcus. She appears in the first light novel.

Jimmy (ジミー, Jimī)
Jimmy was an 8-year-old boy who formerly resided at Grace Field House. He was 1 year younger than Emma, Ray, and Norman. He had short brown hair and an upturned nose. Jimmy was reassuring and unifying. He is described as a bit unreliable, but was always positive and smiling. He could not get good grades because the time limit to answer each question on tests made him feel anxious and he often could not get his answers in on time. Ray would help him study at times. He was shipped in August 2044 at the age of 8. Jimmy was the child shipped before Susan. He appears in the first light novel.

Olivia (オリビア, Oribia)
Olivia was a 12-year-old girl who formerly resided at Grace Field House. She was 2 years older than Emma, Ray, and Norman. Olivia had dark skin and black dreadlocks tied into a ponytail. She was close friends with Michelle. She was shipped on her 12th birthday in April 2044 and was fed to the high-ranking demons in the Imperial Capital. Olivia was the child shipped before Jimmy. She appears in the first light novel and the omake.

Michelle (ミシェル, Misheru)
Michelle was a 12-year-old girl who formerly resided at Grace Field House. She was 2 years older than Emma, Ray, and Norman. Michelle had light skin and long curly blonde hair tied into a ponytail with long bangs that reached to her chin on the left side of her head. She was close friends with Olivia. She was shipped on her 12th birthday in February 2044 and was fed to the high-ranking demons in the Imperial Capital. Michelle was the child shipped before Olivia. She appears in the first light novel and the omake.

Robert (ロバート, Robāto)
Robert was a boy who formerly resided at Grace Field House. He was 2 years older than Emma, Ray, and Norman. He had short black hair and wore circular glasses. Robert loved to play dark, gloomy songs on the piano. He appears in the first light novel.

Helena (ヘレナ, Herena)
Helena was a girl who formerly resided at Grace Field House. She was 1 year older than Emma, Ray, and Norman. She had big eyes and long blonde hair tied into a single braid in the back that she sometimes wore wrapped around her head like a hairband. Helena was the best artist in the house and loved to draw optical illusions. She appears in the first light novel.

Abby (アビー, Abī)
Abby was a girl who formerly resided at Grace Field House. She was 1 years older than Emma, Ray, and Norman. She was rather tall for her age and had a long face, freckles, and auburn colored hair tied into two short pigtails. Abby was a fan of Helena's drawings. She appears in the first light novel.

Chucky (チャッキー, Chakkī)
Chucky was a boy who formerly resided at Grace Field House. He was a fat child with short light hair and long bangs. Chucky used to wet himself at night. He appears in the first light novel.

Cindy (シンディ, Shindi)
Cindy was a girl who formerly resided at Grace Field House. She wore a hairband and had tan skin with rosy cheeks and white hair with long bangs parted down the middle. Cindy enjoyed playing the violin. She appears in the first light novel.

Kate (ケイト, Keito)
Kate was a girl who formerly resided at Grace Field House. She had a short stature and light, straight ear-length hair. Kate enjoyed being outdoors and playing ball with her siblings. She appears in the first light novel.

Rosie (ロージー, Rōjī)
Rosie was a girl who formerly resided at Grace Field House. She is only mentioned in the first light novel.

Mack (マック, Makku)
Mack was a boy who formerly resided at Grace Field House. He was a short child with tan skin and messy white hair. Toys belonging to him are shown in chapter 37.

Hana (花, Hana)
Hana was a girl who formerly resided at Grace Field House. She had short black hair with long bangs parted down the middle. Toys belonging to her are shown in chapter 37.

Eric (エリック, Erikku)
Eric was a boy who formerly resided at Grace Field House. He had a large build for his age, as well as a square face with short, messy light hair and thick eyebrows. Toys belonging to him are shown in chapter 37.

Grant (許す, Yurusu)
Grant was a boy who formerly resided at Grace Field House. He was a tall child with an oval-shaped face, short, neat light hair, freckles, and an angular smile. Toys belonging to him are shown in chapter 37.

Black-haired girl (黒髪の女の子, Kurokami no on'nanoko)
Black-haired girl is a placeholder name for an unnamed girl who formerly resided at Grace Field House. She was the same age as Emma, Ray, and Norman and was shipped in 2043, at the age of 9. She had long straight black hair. She appears in the special chapter, The First Shot.

Light-haired girl (明るい髪の女の子, Akarui kami no on'nanoko)
Light-haired girl is a placeholder name for an unnamed girl who formerly resided at Grace Field House. She was the same age as Emma, Ray, and Norman and was shipped in 2042, at the age of 8. She had big eyes and light hair styled into pigtails. She appears in the special chapter, The First Shot.

Light-haired boy (明るい髪の少年, Akarui kami no shōnen)
Light-haired boy is a placeholder name for an unnamed boy who formerly resided at Grace Field House. He was the same age as Emma, Ray, and Norman and was shipped in 2040, at the age of 6. He had short light hair with swoopy bangs and big eyes. He claimed to have horrible test scores. He appears in the special chapter, The First Shot.

Yukko (ゆっこ, Yukko)
Yukko is Phil's new mom at Grace Field House. She is a tall, slender woman with light-colored eyes and short, blonde hair tucked behind her ears and short bangs. Not long after Phil, Eugene, Sherry and a couple of other children from Grace Field House Plant 3 were sent to live with her, Yukko immediately acknowledged Phil to be one of the smartest children at her plantation. She also accompanied one her children, Simon, to get shipped off and ultimately killed by the demons. After some time, Yukko started to notice Phil's strange behavior as he was often seen in a sad and depressed mood. Eventually, she grew suspicious towards him and called Andrew to visit Phil and investigate.

Jackie (ジャッキー, Jakkī)
Jackie is a 10-year-old boy living under the parental care of Yukko at Grace Field House. He is Phil's new oldest brother and has short brown hair and freckles. Jackie is a happy boy who likes to play outside.

Simon (サイモン, Saimon)
Voiced by: Kimberley Anne Campbell
Simon is an 8-year-old boy living under the parental care of Yukko at Grace Field House. He is Phil's new older brother and has thick eyebrows, short, wavy blonde hair, and slanted eyes. After Phil was sent to live with Simon, the two quickly bonded and became good friends. Simon enjoys making jokes and is always smiling and laughing.

Helen (ヘレン, Heren)
Helen is a 7-year-old girl living under the parental care of Yukko at Grace Field House. She is Phil's new older sister and has shoulder-length blonde hair tied into twin braids. Helen is a sweet and caring girl.

Matilda (マティルダ, Matiruda)
Matilda is a 30-year-old woman residing at Grace Field Headquarters. She has blue eyes and short white hair with long bangs parted down the middle and reaching past her chin. She is described in Volume 19 as a woman who can make friends with everyone, and who has cried and suffered more than the others, while doing it in secret. She is also an ambitious woman whose main goal is to climb the hierarchy, obeying Sarah and Isabella. Matilda is one of the most competent "Sisters" at Grace Field, to the point that 'Grandma' Sarah had chosen her as her personal assistant. After Sarah's death and Isabella's appointment as the new 'Grandma', Matilda was one of the few whom Isabella revealed her true plans to along with Sienna, Scarlet, and Jessica, and together they set out for a rebellion against Peter Ratri and the demons. Matilda is Norman's biological mother. She appears in the special chapter, A Mother's Determination.

Sienna (シエナ, Shiena)
Sienna is a woman residing at Grace Field Headquarters. She has shoulder-length unruly orange hair and green eyes. She is described in Volume 19 as a very shy, modest and not very brave woman. Her only wish is not to die. Being a woman who never makes special requests, she turned out to be one of the most reliable "Sisters". Sienna is also an ambitious woman whose main goal is to climb the hierarchy, obeying Sarah and Isabella. After Sarah's death and Isabella's appointment as the new 'Grandma', Sienna was one of the few whom Isabella revealed her true plans to along with Matilda, Scarlet, and Jessica, and together they set out for a rebellion against Peter Ratri and the demons. Sienna is Emma's biological mother. She appears in the special chapter, A Mother's Determination.

Scarlet (スカーレット, Skāretto)
Scarlet is a woman residing at Grace Field Headquarters. She has dark skin, black eyes, and short black hair styled into a bob with a white hairband. She is described in Volume 19 as a woman who once had a very affectionate disposition, but who has drastically changed since she began training to become a "Sister". Her specialties are the speed in carrying out her tasks and the ability to close her emotions, which has allowed her to climb the hierarchy. Scarlet is also an ambitious woman whose main goal is to climb the hierarchy, obeying Sarah and Isabella. After Sarah's death and Isabella's appointment as the new 'Grandma', Scarlet was one of the few whom Isabella revealed her true plans to along with Matilda, Sienna, and Jessica, and together they set out for a rebellion against Peter Ratri and the demons. Scarlet is Don's biological mother. She appears in the special chapter, A Mother's Determination.

Jessica (ジェシカ, Jeshika)
Jessica is a woman residing at Grace Field Headquarters. She has brown eyes and long black hair that reaches past her chin as is partially tied into a bun. She is described in Volume 19 as a shrewd and calculating woman, and thanks to these skills it was not difficult for her to become a "Sister". She is consistently among the best in any type of test, but she has never been given the place of a 'Mom' due to her difficulties in relating to children. Jessica is also an ambitious woman whose main goal is to climb the hierarchy, obeying Sarah and Isabella. After Sarah's death and Isabella's appointment as the new 'Grandma', Jessica was one of the few whom Isabella revealed her true plans to along with Matilda, Sienna, and Scarlet, and together they set out for a rebellion against Peter Ratri and the demons. Jessica is Gilda's biological mother. She appears in the special chapter, A Mother's Determination.

Cecile (セシル, Seshiru)
Cecile was a young woman who formerly resided at Grace Field Headquarters. Cecile is the main antagonist in the special chapter, Seeking the Sky of Freedom. She was a tall, slender woman with long straight blonde hair and blue eyes. She was 2 years older than Krone and was Krone's childhood best friend from her days at the orphanage whom she reunites with while training to become a "Sister". Together they plotted a daring escape, with a map that was designed from many old pieces of embroidered fabric, created by former trainees. However, Cecille misleads and betrays Krone in order to secure her own position as a "Sister", framing her as the sole conspirator for the jailbreak to 'Grandma' Sarah. This backfires once Krone reveals that Cecille has the map embroidery, leading Grandmother to believe that Cecille was the mastermind, earning Krone the position as "Sister". Cecile is killed as a result.

== Demons ==
The main antagonists of the series, the monsters called demons, consist of a variety of forms; wild, multi-eyed monsters that take on the qualities of the animals and plants they devour. Human-eating demons assume a large human-like humanoid form with polydactyly and wear armored masks to protect their central eyes, their only truly vital organ. The ruling demons sponsor the agricultural system to provide them with a source of ready-to-use human flesh, which they need to remain sentient, and sometimes for the nature of monsters to hunt humans.

Mujika (ムジカ, Mujika)
Voiced by: Atsumi Tanezaki (Japanese); Lizzie Freeman (English)
Mujika is a demon living in the forest outside the Grace Field House. She has long, purple hair in braided pigtails covering parts of her horns, and wears a mask with two holes positioned vertically. She has a pale complexion and wears a bluish-white cloak. Mujika was born with the ability to retain characteristics and sapience of humans without needing to consume them. She, together with Sonju believes in a religious principle to not eat farmed humans. Mujika and Sonju were notified of the "goods" that escaped from Grace Field House and decided to save Emma and the other escapees from demon pursuers from the farm. She and Sonju taught the children basic survival skills.

Sonju (ソンジュ, Sonju)
Voiced by: Shin'ichirō Kamio (Japanese); Daman Mills (English)
Sonju is a demon that lives outside Grace Field House. He is a relatively tall and lean demon who wears a hood and a mask that covers his entire face which when taken off, reveals his abnormally sharp canines. He has a horn at the center of his forehead and his arms are entirely wrapped with a bandage. He is often seen carrying a spear and is a skilled hunter. Sonju saved Ray from being captured by his demon-hound pursuers from the farm. Sonju believes in the same religion as Mujika, hence is strongly against the practice of eating farmed humans. However, he is eager to resume eating humans once their population increased naturally. Sonju retains a stoic and composed personality, but to a certain degree was intrigued by the children and cared for their safety. He tells Emma and Ray how, following a long war, the world was divided into the Human World and the Demon World through a contract called "The Promise". He is also the younger brother of Leuvis and Queen Legravalima.

Legravalima (レグラヴァリマ, Reguravarima)
Legravalima is the Queen of the Demon World. Along with the various heads of the Ratri Clan, Legravalima was one of the main perpetrators of the promise and one of the main obstacles to freeing the children from farms from the hands of the demons. She craves the most high-quality human meat from him, since she deemed herself much better than everyone else. Additionally, since she wanted to reign the Demon World, she killed her father to take over the throne. Although she now had found a new life of luxury, she lacked one thing: her perfect human meat. When she heard about Norman, him having the greatest mind of all, she refused to let him be eaten by the Demon King, Him. As so, she sent him to Lambda, all of which because she simply wanted to devour him herself. During a flashback to 700 years prior, when the lower demon classes were shown to be starving and on the verge to devolution, the former Lord Geelan advocated giving some of the high-grade meat to the people. Legravalima instead decided to allow the lower classes to starve, devolve, and eventually eat themselves, as that would solve their population problem. She also is the older sister of Leuvis and Sonju.

মশ্লয়/Him (彼, Kare)
He, also known as মশ্লয়, is the king of all demons and the demon world. His real name is unclear to humans, he lives alone in a special dimension where the laws of time and physics do not apply. He has by his side a mysterious dragon that has only one eye in its head, which resembles the pendant and necklace that Mujika gave to Emma. Anyone who tries to contact Him must go through a special ritual and trial that involves strange metaphysical puzzles. He is small, with a child-like appearance. His origins are unclear, but he was the one capable of making Promises on behalf of the demons. 1,000 years ago, He made the deal with Julius Ratri that became known as "The Promise" – the demons and humans would be partitioned between two worlds, unable to access one another. The Human World would be free of demon predation, and in exchange, the demons would be allowed to farm the humans stranded on their world. The Ratri Clan additionally were tasked with maintaining "The Promise", with Julius Ratri forced to stay in the Demon World. For the Demon's, He declared the Tifari, an annual festival which would culminate in the very best of all farmed human meat be offered to Him as tribute.

Leuvis (レウウィス, Reuwisu) / Lewis (ルイス, Ruisu)
Leuvis, also known as "Lewis", is an aristocrat who belonged to the group of demons known as "Poachers". As a Poacher, he worked alongside Lord Bayon, the purveyor for the Grand Valley orphanage to supply their secret hunting reserve, Goldy Pond, with humans for them to hunt. Leuvis enjoys the thrill of hunting human children, but is bored with the relative ease at which he can kill them. It's only when the thrill of meeting someone with the will to kill him, like Emma, arrives that he decides to take the hunting game seriously. Leuvis is a tall, slender demon who sees the lives of humans as nothing more than a game to entertain him. He is evil, sadistic, and merciless, and shows no regret or hesitation in killing the children. He is also the younger brother of Queen Legravalima and the older brother of Sonju, as well as a part of the Royal Family in the Demon World.

Palvus (パルバス, Parubasu)
Palvus is the companion of Leuvis and a minor antagonist during the Goldy Pond arc. He is a small, purple demon with one eye and the physical features of a monkey. A tiny crown is perched on top of his head. Palvus acts as a pet of Leuvis, and is often seen accompanying Leuvis on his shoulder and at times acts as a "second pair of eyes" for him.

Bayon (バイヨン, Baiyon)
Lord Bayon belongs to the group of demons known as the "Poachers". He is the owner of the secret human hunting reserve Goldy Pond where he hunts orphans who ends up there. A millennium ago, Bayon was in a meeting with several demons discussing how they should consume humans when they are recently forbidden to do so due to "The Promise." As the demons complained, Bayon came up with the solution of building the farms to "cultivate" the young of the humans to satisfy the demons' need of consuming human flesh, as well as to comply with the treaty. Therefore, Bayon's solution was accepted and included as part of the treaty. Around 200 years after the establishment of the farms, Bayon got elected as an investor and manager of several farms. Years later, Bayon, Leuvis, Nous, Nouma, Luce and a few other demons overran a deserted human town called Goldy Pond, which they turned into a hunting ground as human children who had either been bought or stumbled into the place by accident were thrown into the hunting ground for Bayon and his team to hunt.

Luce (ルーチェ, Rūche)
Luce is a tiny, white-colored demon with over 20 eyes and razor-sharp teeth who belongs to a group of demons known as the "Poachers". Every three days, he and the other "Poachers" hunt human children at Goldy Pond. Luce is a sadistic demon who enjoys hunting young children and killing them in cold blood. He is responsible for the death of Gillian's sister. This caused Gillian to hold a huge grudge against him.

Nouma (ノウマ, Nūma)
Nouma belongs to the group of demons known as the "Poachers". Every three days, she and the other "Poachers" hunt human children at Goldy Pond. She is a black demon with a tall, humanoid body and she is close to her brother, Nous. Like Nous, Nouma is a sadistic demon who enjoys hunting young children and killing them in cold blood.

Nous (ノウス, Nousu)
Nous belongs to the group of demons known as the "Poachers". Every three days, he and the other "Poachers" hunt human children at Goldy Pond. He is a black demon with a tall, humanoid body and is protective of his sister, Nouma. Like Nouma, Nous is a sadistic demon who enjoys hunting young children and killing them in cold blood.

Geelan (ギーラン, Gīran)
Geelan is the Lord of the Geelan Clan and previously a demon noble who advised the royal family and nobility. Seven hundred years ago, Geelan was a noble and honorable demon who tried to find peaceful solutions to problems regarding the overpopulation. He was the only member who advocated for the good of the lower masses and tried to convince his fellow heads to provide the masses with high-quality human meat from the premium farms to prevent starvation. However, Queen Legravalima loathed this idea, and because his morals opposed the Queen's view on the situation, she and the other Five Regent Families left him and his clan to rot in the wastelands as punishment for his intentions. Because they were not able to consume human flesh for a period of 700 years, Geelan's clan was forced to eat each other as to not degenerate into wild demons. Ever since then, Geelan harbored a great hatred towards the royal family and desired to get his revenge on them, which he did during Norman's surprise attack on the Imperial City during the Tifari. However, he was killed at the hands of Queen Legravalima towards the end of the battle.

Dozza (ドッザ, Dozza)
Dozza is an antagonist in the Cuvitidala Arc. He is the father of Luce, as well as one of the heads of the Five Regent Families. He wears a big mask with two horns at the top. Seven hundred years ago, Dozza was a bodyguard for the former head of the Five Regent Families, Lord Geelan. However, Geelan was the only member who advocated for the good of the lower masses and tried to convince his fellow heads to provide the masses with high-quality human meat from the premium farms to prevent starvation. Dozza took advantage of this since the royals loathed Geelan's morals and mindset, and framed him for conspiring with the "evil blooded" race. Additionally, because Dozza's duplicitous nature suited the royal family's interests more, Geelan was banished and Dozza was given his spot. He was later killed by Geelan after the latter infiltrated the royal capital to get revenge.

Bayon II (バイヨン, Baiyon)
Bayon II is an antagonist in the Cuvitidala Arc. He is the son of the owner of Goldy Pond, Lord Bayon, and one of the heads of the Five Regent Families. Unlike the majority of the royals and heads of the Five Regent Families, Bayon II cared more for demon civilians than his money and control over the world. Bayon II admired former Lord Geelan for being a selfless demon who cared about his underlings. However, Bayon II's admiration for the former Lord faltered once the latter invaded the Tifari and revealed that he and his followers had consumed the royal families in order to ambush the heads. He was later killed by Geelan after the latter infiltrated the royal capital to get revenge.

Yverk (イヴェルク, Iveruku)
Voiced by: Motoki Sakuma (Japanese); Bob Carter (English)
Yverk is an antagonist in the Cuvitidala Arc. He was a duke as well as one of the heads of the Five Regent Families. Yverk is a tall demon who wears formal clothes. Like most of the other royals and the other heads of the Five Regent Families, Yverk cares more about his money and control over the world over the well-being of the demon civilians. Being the head of his respective house, Yverk is a powerful and strict demon who constantly reprimanded Dozza on his manners and behavior. Yverk holds a lot of respect to the queen, instantly kneeling for her whenever she entered the room. He was killed by Geelan after the latter infiltrated the royal capital to get revenge.

Noum (ノウム, Noumu)
Noum is an antagonist in the Cuvitidala Arc. She is a relative of Nous and Nouma, as well as one of the heads of the Five Regent Families. Noum has a petite, black-colored humanoid body and a mask. She is also seen wielding a spear. Like most of the other royals and the other heads of the Five Regent Families, Noum cares more about her money and control over the world over the well-being of the demon civilians. She was killed by Geelan after the latter infiltrated the royal capital to get revenge.

Pupo (プポ, Pupo)
Pupo is an antagonist in the Cuvitidala Arc. He is one of the heads of the Five Regent Families. He wears a mask with two horns on it to protect his eyes and face. Like most of the other royals and the other heads of the Five Regent Families, Pupo cares more about his money and control over the world over the well-being of the demon civilians. He was killed by Geelan after the latter infiltrated the royal capital to get revenge.

Former Lord Noum (ノウム, Noumu)
Former Lord Noum was a minor character who appeared during Geelan's flashback in the Imperial Capital Battle Arc. He was the father of the Noum, and a relative of Nous and Nouma, as well as a former head of the Five Regent Families. Noum had a black-colored humanoid body with a ponytail. He wears a coffin-shaped black mask with a single eyehole. Like most of the other royalties and the other heads of the Five Regent Families, Noum cared more about himself and their control over the world over the well-being of the demon civilians.

Ayshe's father (アイシェの父, Aishe no chichi)
Ayshe's father is a placeholder name for an unnamed demon who formerly worked at one of the premium farms, and later chose to spend his life with his adoptive human daughter Ayshe and his pet dogs. During his youth, the demon's face lost its shape one day, and he developed a large bulge on the right side of his face which was covered in eyes and tiny pores – he himself called it a curse. Years later, the demon worked as an employee at one of the premium farms and was in charge of disposing of human infants born with physical defects. One day, the demon spotted a human infant with a large birthmark covering the right side of her face. He immediately developed a connection with her, since both of them had facial defects on the right side of their faces. This prompted him to take the infant home with him instead of disposing of her. He soon quit his job at the premium farms and lived with his newly adopted daughter, who he named Ayshe. The demon cared for Ayshe, played with her, taught her the demon and human languages, educated her and fed her well. The facial defect the demon had no longer felt like a curse for him, as he had found a happy and loving life with his daughter. Tragedy struck the father and daughter one day, as Norman and his team raided the demon's house. When Ayshe's father heard their commotion, he told Ayshe to hide. Ayshe's father was then killed by Norman's underling, Zazie. Norman and his team "rescued" Ayshe, believing she was a captive of the demon, and brought her to The Paradise Hideout, where she became an expert markswoman in order to one day avenge her father by killing his murderers.

Mawla (マウラ, Maura)
Mawla is a young demon child who lived in the Imperial Capital with her parents and sister, Awla. She wears the typical demon commoner's mask featuring two horns. She has light-colored hair and fair skin. After Norman and his group poisoned the entire demon capital, Awla and Mawla's parents degenerated into wild demons. However, they were saved by Mujika when she gave them her blood to drink, and ultimately reverted back to their normal forms. Awla and Mawla receive a dosage of blood as well. After the death of Queen Legravalima, Awla and Mawla's parents were taken away by soldiers sent by The Ratri Clan to capture all the demons who had ingested Mujika's "evil" blood and have them executed, leaving the two girls orphans.

Awla (アウラ, Aura)
Awla is a young demon child who lived in the Imperial Capital with her parents and sister, Mawla. She wears the typical demon commoner's mask featuring two horns. She has dark-colored hair and dark skin. After Norman and his group poisoned the entire demon capital, Awla and Mawla's parents degenerated into wild demons. However, they were saved by Mujika when she gave them her blood to drink, and ultimately reverted back to their normal forms. Awla and Mawla receive a dosage of blood as well. After the death of Queen Legravalima, Awla and Mawla's parents were taken away by soldiers sent by The Ratri Clan to capture all the demons who had ingested Mujika's "evil" blood and have them executed, leaving the two girls orphans.

Vylk (ヴィルク, Vylk)
Voiced by: Toshiya Ueda (Japanese); Jake Eberle (English)
Vylk is a character who only appears in the anime. He is a blind, elderly demon who wears a robe, along with a grey piece of cloth over his eyes. He uses a walking stick and carries a luggage on his back. He is a friendly demon who understands that the humans are not just foods because they also have minds. Although, he sometimes eats humans depending on the situation. He is always praying and loves his family very much. At some point in history, Vylk consumed the "evil blood", which allows him to retain the characteristics and sapience of humans without needing to consume them. He first appears at the temple bringing the children food, he was not able to recognize the children as humans due to his blindness, and believed that they were demon children passing through. While the demon village was under attack by Norman and his drug which causes demons to degenerate, Vylk calls out to his granddaughter, Demon Emma, and encourages her to drink his blood to prevent her from degenerating. When the children were at the temple, he gave Emma the other part of the Promised Pen that he got 15 years ago from a man who was about to die. Later, Vylk led an uprising of demon civilians against the farms, along with Mujika and Sonju.

Demon Emma (エマ, Ema)
Voiced by Xanthe Huynh
Demon Emma is a character who only appears in the anime. She is a kind and caring young demon girl who has short purple hair and wears a mask with two small horns on it. While the demon village was under attack by Norman and his drug which causes demons to degenerate, Demon Emma went out to look for her grandfather, Vylk. While she was looking for Vylk, Norman was behind Demon Emma and was about to stab her in the back. However, Vylk called out to her and she went over to him. Once the drugs reached the two demons, Vylk did not degenerate, but Demon Emma did. The elderly demon told Demon Emma to drink his blood to return her body to its original form. Later, while the children are at the temple, Demon Emma apologizes to Norman for how the demons had treated him and the other humans. When Vylk called out to Demon Emma, human Emma was left confused. The two Emmas smiled at each other and both walked with Vylk to the exit.

== Goldy Pond ==
Also known as Area A08-63, Goldy Pond was originally William Minerva's base for human escapees and located underground to evade detection. It was discovered by demons and became a secret reserve for hunting humans, owned by the demon Lord Bayon. His victims were the children he bought from premium farms (mainly the Grand Valley House Orphanage), but sometimes also poached humans from the outside world. Listed below are some of the human inhabitants of Goldy Pond:

Zack (ザック, Zakku)
Zack is an 18-year-old man born and raised at Grand Valley Orphanage. He was shipped out to Goldy Pond to become prey for the Poachers to hunt. Zack is very skilled in relief aid and eventually he was recruited by Lucas into the Goldy Pond Resistance, becoming their medic, along with Sandy. He is tall, have dark skin and a scar across his face. He has short, upwards-spiked black hair and he wears a bandana which covers his whole forehead. He also wears a coat which occasionally covers the lower side of his face. Zack is athletic, great with weapons and at escaping, and so, he never flinches when staring death in the face. This is why he is dubbed the most experienced veteran among the Goldy Pond children, and it's always he who risks his neck during hunts. He has saved Nigel and the otherchildren' lives countless times, demonstrating his selflessness and loyalty.

Oliver (オリバー, Oribā)
Oliver is a 17-year-old boy born and raised at Grand Valley Orphanage. He was shipped out to Goldy Pond to become prey for the Poachers to hunt. Together with Lucas, he formed a resistance organization to destroy Goldy Pond and the Poachers. Serving as the leader of the Goldy Pond Resistance movement, he has gained a lot of confidence from his comrades. So much, that they started calling him their leader. Oliver is a young man of average height. He has messy white hair with a red streak on the left and red eyes. Oliver is a strong-willed person who cares deeply about the well being of his comrades. He also holds a strong grudge against the Poachers for all the harm and bloodshed they caused.

Sandy (サンディ, Sandi)
Sandy is a 17-year-old boy born and raised at Grand Valley Orphanage. He was shipped out to Goldy Pond to become prey for the Poachers to hunt. Eventually, he was recruited by Lucas into the Goldy Pond Resistance, becoming their relief aid, along with Zack. Sandy has curly green hair and wide eyes and wears hair clips in several colors as well as a dark green vest. He's the one who gave Emma the hair clips she wears in Goldy Pond. His personality and demeanor contrast to that of Zack. Sandy is a happy and positive individual among his friends. He's always quick to offer encouragement or a smile. Like the other Goldy Pond kids, he is loyal and cares deeply about his allies. During the Goldy Pond battle, Sonya and Sandy fights against Nous and Nouma.

Sonya (ソーニヤ, Sōniya)
Sonya is a 17-year-old girl born and raised at Grand Valley Orphanage. She was shipped out to Goldy Pond to become prey for the Poachers to hunt. Sonya acts as the Second-in-Command of the Goldy Pond Resistance. Sonya wears glasses and has blue hair styled into pigtails with freckles on her face. Sonya is skilled at making mental calculations and compiling data to use to fight the demons. She is a calm and cool-headed girl who thinks logically, makes plans, and doesn't hesitate to order others around.

Paula (ポーラ, Pōra)
Paula is a 17-year-old girl born and raised at Grand Valley Orphanage. She was shipped out to Goldy Pond to become prey for the Poachers to hunt. After arriving in Goldy Pond, she joined the Goldy Pond Resistance, where she ended up in charge of the provisions. Paula is a fair-skinned girl with long, black hair partially done up. She dresses in dark clothes and wears a bandanna covering her mouth. Paula is loyal and caring like all the Goldy Pond kids. However, she is reserved and doesn't talk much. Paula is skilled in sniping Demons with her gun.

Nigel (ナイジェル, Naijeru)
Nigel is a 16-year-old boy born and raised at Grand Valley Orphanage. He was shipped out to Goldy Pond to become prey for the Poachers to hunt. Shortly after arriving in Goldy Pond, Nigel witnessed the death of his younger sister, Lala at the hands of Luce, which brought him intense grief. Nigel served as the mechanic for the Goldy Pond Resistance. He's also in charge of the ammo stockpile. He wears a simple sweater, trousers and an Aviator hat with broken, rectangular goggles. Nigel cares deeply for his friends, especially Zack, whom he looks up to, and Gillian. He's willing to sacrifice himself for them and for the greater good. While he has a good head on his shoulders, he doesn't always think things through before acting. He gets nervous easily, and pretends to have a plan when Gillian asks him what he'll do next. As described by Gillian, Nigel is a very rational person. During the Goldy Pond battle, Nigel helps Gillian fight Luce and his attendants. While fulfilling a role pivoted on accurate and careful aiming, Nigel possesses extremely sharp reflexes and can rapidly react to danger. He has displayed excellent shooting skills in the use of his sniping rifle and is also skilled at maintaining and repairing machines.

Pepe (ぺぺ, Pepe)
Pepe is a 16-year-old boy born and raised at Grand Valley Orphanage. He was shipped out to Goldy Pond to become prey for the Poachers to hunt. After arriving in Goldy Pond, he joined the Goldy Pond Resistance, where he ended up in charge of the provisions. Pepe has dark skin and dark hair worn in a ponytail. He also wears an eyeglass. He is hardworking, resourceful and confident. Pepe and Zack are assigned to keep Bayon busy during the uprising. Like all the other kids in Goldy Pond, he cares deeply for his comrades and hates to see them injured. Pepe was shown to be on good terms with them despite how he only joined not long ago. He is also very skilled at creative cooking.

Gillian (ジリアン, Jirian)
Gillian is a 15-year-old girl born and raised at Grand Valley Orphanage. She was shipped out to Goldy Pond to become prey for the Poachers to hunt. Shortly after arriving in Goldy Pond, Gillian witnessed the death of her older sister, Emilia at the hands of Luce, which brought her intense grief. Determined to get revenge, Gillian joined the Goldy Pond Resistance, where she ended up in charge of the provisions. Gillian is a girl with shoulder-length light blonde hair and light green eyes. She is almost always seen with a large smile across her face, highlighting her outgoing nature. She wears a pink wool-made beanie hat that is covered with patches she made herself from the stuffed clowns in Goldy Pond, along with a lime green coat with more pins on it that she made. Gillian is a high-spirited and outgoing girl, which thus made her stood out from the rest of the members of the Goldy Pond Resistance, whom are mostly serious in nature. Gillian is skilled at shooting and killing demons. As shown in the Goldy Pond Battle Arc, she utilizes two guns filled with ammunition to take down the demons.

Violet (バイオレット, Baioretto)
Violet is a 13-year-old girl born and raised at Grand Valley Orphanage. She was shipped out to Goldy Pond to become prey for the Poachers to hunt. Violet harbors a strong hatred for the Poachers after witnessing them kill her family. Determined to get vengeance, Violet joined the Goldy Pond Resistance, where she ended up taking the role of a lookout. She is also the first person to encounter Emma at Goldy Pond. Violet has a violet pixie haircut with violet eyes. She is often mistaken as a boy like Emma thought she was when she first met her. During the Goldy Pond battle, Violet fought alongside Sandy, Sonya, and Paula against Nous and Nouma. Violet and Paula were able to snipe Nouma down when Sonya broke her mask.

Adam (アダム, Adamu)
Adam is a former experiment who was born and raised in Lambda. After being transported to Goldy Pond, he became the gatekeeper of the Goldy Pond Resistance. As a result of the experiments performed on him at Lambda, Adam is large and bulky, with a wide frame, elongated and extremely muscular arms, a small amount of wispy, short blonde hair and a round face with a large nose. Adam also has prominent veins across his body, with the most obvious being two on his forehead and he is far taller than the other kids in Goldy Pond. Adam's personality is generally unknown, but he lacks a significant mental capacity, with even Leuvis referring to him as a "simpleton", and "incapable of complex thought". Despite Adam's powerful combat abilities and simple nature, he seems to be friendly with the other children, as evidenced by his interactions with them after everyone returned to Shelter B06-32.

Theo (ティオ, Teio)
Theo is a 12-year-old boy born and raised at Grand Valley Orphanage. At some point, he was shipped out to Goldy Pond to become prey for the Poachers to hunt. Theo was especially close to his brother, Jake and sister, Monica and was left devastated and traumatized when Leuvis killed them. Afterwards, he joined the Goldy Pond Resistance along with Emma to defeat the demons of Goldy Pond. Theo is a young boy below average height. He has eyes that are often seen closed and short hair that is slicked back to the back of his head. Due to all the running, he had done from the poachers, Theo's attire is covered in filth and blood. Theo is a joyful young boy who loves his siblings, Monica and Jake, to great lengths, sticking together with them even when Emma ordered them to split and flee from the demons. Theo is very grateful to Emma for saving him and he absolutely despises Leuvis for killing his siblings. He used a knife for self-defense against the Poachers. Before Theo, along with Jake and Monica, was sent to the Goldy Pond, Theo was known to once live in the same orphanage as the two. He, Jake, and Monica were known to be very close throughout their time in the orphanage, seeing each other as siblings.

Jake (ジェイク, Jeiku)
Jake was a boy born and raised at Grand Valley Orphanage. At some point, he was shipped out to Goldy Pond to become prey for the Poachers to hunt. He, along with his sister Monica, were killed by Leuvis while trying to protect their younger brother Theo in one of the hunts. Jake was a tall and burly young boy. He had a rather large nose and short, messy hair. Not much was known about Jake's personality, but he was shown to be rather cowardly and easily intimidated by the demons. Before Jake, along with Theo and Monica, was sent to the Goldy Pond, Jake was known to once live in the same orphanage as the two. He, Theo, and Monica were known to be very close throughout their time in the orphanage, seeing each other as siblings. When Jake and Emma first met, Jake, appeared to be rather skeptical towards her, as he did not seem to trust Emma when she tried to befriend them. Nevertheless, he was still willing to exchange names with her. When Jake, along with Monica and Theo, tried to defend themselves from the poachers, the weapon that he possessed was an axe.

Monica (モニカ, Monika)
Monica was a girl born and raised at Grand Valley Orphanage. At some point, she was shipped out to Goldy Pond to become prey for the Poachers to hunt. She, along with her brother Jake, were killed by Leuvis while trying to protect their younger brother Theo in one of the hunts. Out of the three, Monica appeared to be the bravest and most courageous in the group, as she did not hesitate to save Theo from the poachers, despite knowing the chances of beating them are slim. When Monica tried to defend herself and Theo, she used a spear to fight against the poachers. She wears a seemingly filthy high-collar clothing with black leggings and a pair of boots. Her hair is tied neatly into a ponytail. Before Monica, along with Theo and Jake, was sent to the Goldy Pond, Monica was known to once live in the same orphanage as the two. She, Theo, and Jake were known to be very close throughout their time in the orphanage, seeing each other as siblings.

Windmill boy (風車の少年, Kazaguruma no shōnen)
Windmill boy is a placeholder name for an unnamed boy who helped Lucas escape from Leuvis at Goldy Pond. He gave Lucas shelter at the windmill he was hiding in from the demons in and tended to his severed arm. He and Lucas lived together in the windmill and became good friends before he died five years later due to illness. In the years following his death, Lucas lived alone in the windmill. He appeared to be a boy with white braided hair and brown skin. In the official 2020 fan book titled The Promised Neverland 0: Mystic Code author Kaiu Shirai describes him as "cautious" and "a coward" saying "he found the underground pit while searching for a place to hide. He didn't want to take the risk of being found by demons. So he couldn't let anyone know of this place and piled up his guilt and pain. He found Lucas injured and on brink of death. Normally he wouldn't do anything, but feeling guilty about everyone who he'd abandoned so far, he wanted to help."

Mary (メアリー, Mearī)
Mary was a 14-year-old girl born and raised at Grand Valley Orphanage. She had short uneven light hair and was shipped out to Goldy Pond to become prey for the Poachers to hunt. After Emma and the Goldy Pond Resistance defeated the Poachers and destroyed Goldy Pond, Mary and 45 other children from Goldy Pond moved into Shelter B06-32 where they lived happily together for over a year. Mary was one of the six kids killed by Andrew and his team when they raided the shelter. Her name is revealed in an extra page found in Volume 14.

Fred (フレッド, Fureddo)
Fred was a 14-year-old boy born and raised at Grand Valley Orphanage. He had short messy dark hair and was shipped out to Goldy Pond to become prey for the Poachers to hunt. After Emma and the Goldy Pond Resistance defeated the Poachers and destroyed Goldy Pond, Fred and 45 other children from Goldy Pond moved into Shelter B06-32 where they lived happily together for over a year. Fred was one of the six kids killed by Andrew and his team when they raided the shelter. His name is revealed in an extra page found in Volume 14.

Malcolm (マルコム, Marukomu)
Malcolm was a 14-year-old boy born and raised at Grand Valley Orphanage. He had short messy light hair and wore a bandanna around his forehead and was shipped out to Goldy Pond to become prey for the Poachers to hunt. After Emma and the Goldy Pond Resistance defeated the Poachers and destroyed Goldy Pond, Malcolm and 45 other children from Goldy Pond moved into Shelter B06-32 where they lived happily together for over a year. Malcolm was one of the six kids killed by Andrew and his team when they raided the shelter. His name is revealed in an extra page found in Volume 14.

Michael (マイケル, Maikeru)
Michael was a 14-year-old boy born and raised at Grand Valley Orphanage. He had short messy light hair and was shipped out to Goldy Pond to become prey for the Poachers to hunt. After Emma and the Goldy Pond Resistance defeated the Poachers and destroyed Goldy Pond, Michael and 45 other children from Goldy Pond moved into Shelter B06-32 where they lived happily together for over a year. Michael was one of the six kids killed by Andrew and his team when they raided the shelter. His name is revealed in an extra page found in Volume 14.

Elliott (エリオット, Eriotto)
Elliott was a 14-year-old boy born and raised at Grand Valley Orphanage. He had short straight light hair and was shipped out to Goldy Pond to become prey for the Poachers to hunt. After Emma and the Goldy Pond Resistance defeated the Poachers and destroyed Goldy Pond, Elliott and 45 other children from Goldy Pond moved into Shelter B06-32 where they lived happily together for over a year. Elliott was one of the six kids killed by Andrew and his team when they raided the shelter. His name is revealed in an extra page found in Volume 14.

Johnny (ジョニー, Jonī)
Johnny was a 14-year-old boy born and raised at Grand Valley Orphanage. He had spiky black hair and a scar on his forehead and was shipped out to Goldy Pond to become prey for the Poachers to hunt. After Emma and the Goldy Pond Resistance defeated the Poachers and destroyed Goldy Pond, Johnny and 45 other children from Goldy Pond moved into Shelter B06-32 where they lived happily together for over a year. Johnny was one of the six kids killed by Andrew and his team when they raided the shelter. His name is revealed in an extra page found in Volume 14.

Lucy (ルーシー, Rūshī)
Lucy is a 14-year-old girl born and raised at Grand Valley Orphanage. She had long, straight light hair and was shipped out to Goldy Pond to become prey for the Poachers to hunt. After Emma and the Goldy Pond Resistance defeated the Poachers and destroyed Goldy Pond, Lucy and 45 other children from Goldy Pond moved into Shelter B06-32 where they lived happily together for over a year. Lucy succeeded in making it to the Human World with the rest of the surviving escapees and was sad when Emma went missing. Her name is revealed in an extra page found in Volume 20.

Lala (ララ, Rara)
Lala was a young girl born and raised at Grand Valley Orphanage. She was a short girl with light hair styled into three small pigtails, with one on both sides of her head as well as one on top. She was shipped out to Goldy Pond to become prey for the Poachers to hunt along with her older brother, Nigel. During their second hunt, Nigel took Lala to hide in some bushes in the woods. After witnessing a boy close by get attacked by the Poachers, Nigel temporarily left Lala alone in the bushes while he went to try to help the boy. Upon his return, Nigel was terrified to see Lala calling his name as she was forced out of the bushes by one of Luce's servants. The servant threw Lala towards Luce whom cruelly exclaimed "You have the honor to be killed by my hand" before impaling the small girl with his blade, all while Nigel watched on in horror. She appears in the third light novel.

Emilia (エミリア, Emiria)
Emilia was a girl born and raised at Grand Valley Orphanage. She was a tall, slender girl with shoulder-length light hair and was shipped out to Goldy Pond to become prey for the Poachers to hunt along with her younger sister Gillian. During their second hunt, Emilia was impaled by Luce in an attempt to protect her sister. Emilia, still alive, told Gillian to run away which she refused to do. Luce then told Gillian that if she could escape from his servants within ten seconds, he would let both of them live. Gillian agreed and began to run away through the woods. After the ten seconds were up and Gillian successfully outran Luce's servants, she returned to where Emilia was, only to find her dead with a blade sticking out her chest. Luce then told Gillian she was an idiot for thinking he would actually spare her sister if she left her unattended for even ten seconds. She appears in the third light novel.

Sophie (ソフィー, Sofī)
Sophie was a young girl born and raised at Grand Valley Orphanage and was shipped out to Goldy Pond to become prey for the Poachers to hunt where she met and befriended Lala. Upon returning from their first hunt, Lala was visibly worried that Sophie was nowhere to be found. Lala wanted to go look for her in the woods, thinking she must have been injured somewhere. But Nigel, knowing what had really happened, knelt in front of his little sister and told her "Sophie won't come back". Lala immediately burst into tears and Nigel did his best to comfort her. Lala and Nigel then took a walk through a white clover field and proceeded to pick flowers in Sophie's memory. She appears in the third light novel.

== Lambda Λ7214 ==
Lambda Λ7214, also known as Lambda, is a research center where various experiments were conducted on children and humans from various plantation farms. After being shipped from Grace Field House, Norman was sent to Lambda Λ7214, where he was experimented on. Norman eventually led a group who escaped from Lambda and destroyed the place in the process.

Vincent (ヴィンセント, Vinsento)
Voiced by: Hidenori Takahashi (Japanese); Jalen K. Cassell (English)
Vincent is a young man and raised at Glory Bell Orphanage who was shipped out to Lambda. He is tall, have dark skin and stitches on the top of his bald head and green eyes. Vincent is usually seen wearing a white long-sleeved shirt underneath a black vest, black pants, a tie, and glasses. He is knowledgeable about medical treatment.

Cislo (シスロ, Shisuro)
Voiced by: Yoshiki Nakajima (Japanese); Mark Whitten (English)
Cislo is a 17-year-old boy born and raised at Goodwill Ridge Orphanage who was shipped out to Lambda along with his friend, Barbara. Cislo has black eyes and short black hair with a white "X" on top of his head. He wears green overalls with a black shirt underneath, along with black gloves. Cislo has a muscular build and fights demons with a pair of nunchaku.

Barbara (バーバラ, Bābara)
Voiced by: Chika Anzai (Japanese); Allegra Clark (English)
Barbara is a 16-year-old girl born and raised at Goodwill Ridge Orphanage who was shipped out to Lambda along with her friend, Cislo. Barbara has a strong hatred for demons due to the painful experiments they put her through. She eats demon meat as a form of revenge. Barbara has brown eyes and brown hair style into a very long ponytail and wavy bangs. She is often seen wearing a black tank top with a yellow star print, a red jacket, blue shorts and dark gray boots.

Zazie (ザジー, Zajī)
Voiced by: Hidenori Takahashi (Japanese); Jalen K. Cassell (English)
Zazie is a 5-year-old boy born and raised at Lambda. He has the build of an adult as a result of the experiments performed on him. Zazie wears a paper bag over his head and is skilled at fighting demons with two long swords which he wears strapped to his back.

Hayato (ハヤト, Hayato)
Hayato is a 2-year-old boy born at a mass-production farm and transferred to Lambda. He has the build of a boy as a result of the experiments performed on him. Hayato is cheerful and energetic. He has spiky blonde hair, green eyes, and is usually seen wearing a white headband. He is good friends with Jin.

Jin (ジン, Jin)
Jin is a 2-year-old boy born at a mass-production farm and transferred to Lambda. He has the build of a boy as a result of the experiments performed on him. Jin wears a black mask that covers his nose and mouth and is skilled at using a spear. He has black hair pulled back into a short, high ponytail. He often wears a hooded cloak with an owl pin attached. He is good friends with Hayato.

== The Ratri Clan ==
The Ratri Clan or also called the Ratri Family is a human clan who signed the ancient treaty called "The Promise" over 1000 years ago, to separate humans and demons from each other in two worlds, to end a war between the two races on earth. The Ratri clan oversees the farming system and upholds "The Promise".

Peter Ratri (ピーターラートリー, Pītā Rātorī)
Voiced by: Yoshimasa Hosoya (Japanese); Crispin Freeman (English)
Portrayed by: Tōri Matsuzaka
Peter Ratri is a 29-year-old man born who is the 36th and current head of the Ratri Clan and is later revealed to be the true main antagonist. He is the younger brother of James Ratri, as well as the descendant of Julius Ratri. Peter is narcissistic, sadistic, and ruthless, showing no regret for his actions nor sympathy for the children being killed at the farms. He views himself as the "father" of the children and views them as nothing more than food. Peter is extremely loyal to the Ratri Clan and is willing to kill anyone he views as a "traitor" to the family, including his own brother.

William Minerva (ウィリアム・ミネルヴァ, Wiriamu Mineruva) / James Ratri (ジェームズ・ラトリ, Jeimuzu Rātorī)
Voiced by: Yasuyuki Kase (Japanese); Greg Chun (English)
William Minerva is the alias of a man named "James Ratri". James was the 35th head of the Ratri Clan. He is the older brother of Peter Ratri, as well as the descendant of Julius Ratri. James is a mysterious, intelligent, and complex man who grew disgusted with the idea of sacrificing innocent children to demons. After discovering that the children at the farms were actually the descendants of Julius Ratri's allies, he decided to organize a way to help the children escape by planting hidden clues for the children to discover in various books without alerting the 'Moms'. He is the creator of the Promised Pen which serves as a map of the Demon World. He also built safe sanctuaries in the Demon World including Shelter B06-32 and Goldy Pond for children who escaped to live at. James' role as the head of the Ratri Clan was eventually passed down to his younger brother, Peter, who had him executed for being a "traitor" to the family.

Andrew (アンドリュー, Andoryū)
Andrew is a member of the Ratri Clan who works as a loyal underling and assassin for Peter Ratri. He is a stoic, psychotic, and merciless man who led a group of soldiers to ambush Shelter B06-32 and capture the children inside under Peter's orders, which led to the Shelter being destroyed. Andrew has a history of ambushing and destroying safe sanctuaries built by William Minerva for the escapees, as well as killing the children who escaped from the farms. Andrew views the children as nothing more than food and addresses them as "cattle children".

Mike Ratri (マイク・ラートリー, Maiku Rātorī)
Mike Ratri is the uncle of James and Peter Ratri, as well as the current proxy head of the clan in the Human World. He is a middle-aged man who takes his job seriously. Once the children and adults from the farms arrive in the Human World, Mike greets them. He informs the escapees that he is aware of "code solid", and that his clan will no longer harm them. He gives the escapees supplies and a place to stay and helps aid in the search for Emma once she's declared missing.

== Glory Bell Escapees ==
Yuugo (ユウゴ, Yūgo) / Mister (ミスター, Misutā)
Yuugo, also referred to as "Mister", is a 29-year-old man born and raised at Glory Bell Orphanage. Thirteen years ago, when he was 16 years old, Yuugo escaped from Glory Bell Orphanage together with Lucas, Dina, and sixteen other children. They then took solace in Shelter B06-32 where they started a new life. In the shelter, Yuugo found a letter that told him and the other children to go to Goldy Pond where the writer of the letter, William Minerva, left something more behind for them. After arriving at Goldy Pond they encountered the Poachers, who hunt children for fun. There, Leuvis murdered all of his friends with Yuugo just barely managing to escape. Afterwards, he returned to the shelter where he began to live as a hermit, all alone, for the next thirteen years. In the past, Yuugo was cheerful, optimistic and valued his family above else. However, after losing them during their battle against the Poachers, his personality changed drastically. Left all alone and unable to cope with the grief, Yuugo became depressed and suffered from psychological after effects and post-traumatic stress disorder. He also he lost any kind of hope or optimism for the future. When Emma and the Grace Field escapees first encountered him, Yuugo hated the children because they reminded him of himself when he was young and his own family. Emma and Ray managed to convince Yuugo to take them to Goldy Pond where he discovers his old friend Lucas is actually still alive which gives him renewed happiness and hope for the future. By the end of the Goldy Pond battle, Yuugo had grown to care for Emma and the other children, and risked his life to get Emma safely back to the shelter. In the following year, Yuugo and Lucas lived together with everyone in the shelter and became father figures for the children, teaching them survival skills and life lessons. When Andrew and his team attacked the shelter, Lucas and Yuugo sacrificed themselves to save the children.

Lucas (ルーカス, Rūkasu)
Lucas is a 29-year-old man whom thirteen years ago, escaped from Glory Bell Orphanage, along with Yuugo, Dina, and sixteen other kids. After escaping from Glory Bell Orphanage, Lucas and his friends took refuge at Shelter B06-32 before deciding to travel to the human reserve in hopes of finding William Minerva. On the way there, Lucas and his friends were captured by the Poachers who brought them to Goldy Pond. Once there, Leuvis mercilessly slaughtered all of his friends with Lucas and Yuugo barely managing to escape alive. Years later, he reappeared as one of the leaders of a resistance organization located in Goldy Pond. Lucas is a tall young man who has rather long maroon, messy hair with thick, black eyebrows. He also has light skin and light eyes as well as a scar over his face. He lost his right arm in the fight with Leuvis.

Dina (ダイナ, Daina)
Dina was a girl who was born and raised at Glory Bell Orphanage. Thirteen years ago, she escaped from the orphanage, along with Yuugo, Lucas, and sixteen other kids. Dina wore a dark headband to go along with her light hair and long bangs. She enjoyed having tea parties and had an empathetic personality. She was also Yuugo's childhood crush. After escaping from Glory Bell Orphanage, Dina and her friends took refuge at Shelter B06-32 before deciding to travel to the human reserve in hopes of finding William Minerva. On the way there, Dina and her friends were captured by the Poachers who brought them to Goldy Pond. Once there, Leuvis mercilessly slaughtered her and all of her friends with the exception of Yuugo and Lucas whom barely managed to escape alive.

Nicholas (ニコラス, Nikorasu)
Nicholas was a boy who was born and raised at Glory Bell Orphanage. Thirteen years ago, he escaped from the orphanage, along with Yuugo, Lucas, and sixteen other children. Nicholas enjoyed drawing in sketchbooks and playing tag with his siblings. When Yuugo broke his teacup, Nicholas fixed it for him. After escaping from Glory Bell Orphanage, Nicholas and his friends took refuge at Shelter B06-32 before deciding to travel to the human reserve in hopes of finding William Minerva. On the way there, Nicholas and his friends were captured by the Poachers who brought them to Goldy Pond. Once there, Leuvis mercilessly slaughtered him and all of his friends with the exception of Yuugo and Lucas whom barely managed to escape alive. He appears in the third light novel.

Erica (エリカ, Erika)
Erica was a girl who was born and raised at Glory Bell Orphanage. Thirteen years ago, she escaped from the orphanage, along with Yuugo, Lucas, and sixteen other kids. Erica was usually seen with her close friend, Mike. She was younger than Yuugo and often asked him to read stories to her in the library. After escaping from Glory Bell Orphanage, Erica and her friends took refuge at Shelter B06-32 before deciding to travel to the human reserve in hopes of finding William Minerva. On the way there, Erica and her friends were captured by the Poachers who brought them to Goldy Pond. Once there, Leuvis mercilessly slaughtered her and all of her friends with the exception of Yuugo and Lucas whom barely managed to escape alive. She appears in the third light novel.

Mike (マイク, Maiku)
Mike was a boy who was born and raised at Glory Bell Orphanage. Thirteen years ago, he escaped from the orphanage, along with Yuugo, Lucas, and sixteen other kids. Mike was usually seen with his close friend, Erica. He was younger than Yuugo and often asked him to read stories to him in the library. After escaping from Glory Bell Orphanage, Mike and his friends took refuge at Shelter B06-32 before deciding to travel to the human reserve in hopes of finding William Minerva. On the way there, Mike and his friends were captured by the Poachers who brought them to Goldy Pond. Once there, Leuvis mercilessly slaughtered him and all of his friends with the exception of Yuugo and Lucas whom barely managed to escape alive. He appears in the third light novel. (He is not to be confused with Mike Ratri.)

John (ジョン, Jon)
John was a boy who was born and raised at Glory Bell Orphanage. Thirteen years ago, he escaped from the orphanage, along with Yuugo, Lucas, and sixteen other kids. Like all of his siblings, John loved to eat cookies. He also enjoyed organizing teams for him and his siblings to play tag in. After escaping from Glory Bell Orphanage, John and his friends took refuge at Shelter B06-32 before deciding to travel to the human reserve in hopes of finding William Minerva. On the way there, John and his friends were captured by the Poachers who brought them to Goldy Pond. Once there, Leuvis mercilessly slaughtered him and all of his friends with the exception of Yuugo and Lucas whom barely managed to escape alive. He appears in the third light novel.

Anny (アニー, Anī)
Anny was a girl who was born and raised at Glory Bell Orphanage. Thirteen years ago, she escaped from the orphanage, along with Yuugo, Lucas, and sixteen other kids. Anny along with her friend Walter enjoyed gathering flowers and helping her siblings decorate for tea parties. After escaping from Glory Bell Orphanage, and her friends took refuge at Shelter B06-32 before deciding to travel to the human reserve in hopes of finding William Minerva. On the way there, Anny and her friends were captured by the Poachers who brought them to Goldy Pond. Once there, Leuvis mercilessly slaughtered her and all of her friends with the exception of Yuugo and Lucas whom barely managed to escape alive. She appears in the third light novel.

Walter (ウォルター, Walter)
Walter was a boy who was born and raised at Glory Bell Orphanage. Thirteen years ago, he escaped from the orphanage, along with Yuugo, Lucas, and sixteen other kids. Walter along with his friend Anny enjoyed gathering flowers and helping his siblings decorate for tea parties. After escaping from Glory Bell Orphanage, Walter and his friends took refuge at Shelter B06-32 before deciding to travel to the human reserve in hopes of finding William Minerva. On the way there, Walter and his friends were captured by the Poachers who brought them to Goldy Pond. Once there, Leuvis mercilessly slaughtered him and all of his friends with the exception of Yuugo and Lucas whom barely managed to escape alive. He appears in the third light novel.

Maria (マリア, Maria)
Maria was a girl who was born and raised at Glory Bell Orphanage. Thirteen years ago, she escaped from the orphanage, along with Yuugo, Lucas, and sixteen other kids. After escaping from Glory Bell Orphanage, Maria and her friends took refuge at Shelter B06-32 before deciding to travel to the human reserve in hopes of finding William Minerva. On the way there, Maria and her friends were captured by the Poachers who brought them to Goldy Pond. Once there, Leuvis mercilessly slaughtered her and all of her friends with the exception of Yuugo and Lucas whom barely managed to escape alive.

Damian (ダミアン, Damian)
Damian was a boy who was born and raised at Glory Bell Orphanage. Thirteen years ago, he escaped from the orphanage, along with Yuugo, Lucas, and sixteen other kids. After escaping from Glory Bell Orphanage, Damian and his friends took refuge at Shelter B06-32 before deciding to travel to the human reserve in hopes of finding William Minerva. On the way there, Damian and his friends were captured by the Poachers who brought them to Goldy Pond. Once there, Leuvis mercilessly slaughtered him and all of his friends with the exception of Yuugo and Lucas whom barely managed to escape alive.

Viviana (ビビアナ, Bibiana)
Viviana was a girl who was born and raised at Glory Bell Orphanage. Thirteen years ago, she escaped from the orphanage, along with Yuugo, Lucas, and sixteen other kids. After escaping from Glory Bell Orphanage, Viviana and her friends took refuge at Shelter B06-32 before deciding to travel to the human reserve in hopes of finding William Minerva. On the way there, Viviana and her friends were captured by the Poachers who brought them to Goldy Pond. Once there, Leuvis mercilessly slaughtered her and all of her friends with the exception of Yuugo and Lucas whom barely managed to escape alive.

Abel (アベル, Aberu)
Abel was a boy who was born and raised at Glory Bell Orphanage. Thirteen years ago, he escaped from the orphanage, along with Yuugo, Lucas, and sixteen other kids. After escaping from Glory Bell Orphanage, Abel and his friends took refuge at Shelter B06-32 before deciding to travel to the human reserve in hopes of finding William Minerva. On the way there, Abel and his friends were captured by the Poachers who brought them to Goldy Pond. Once there, Leuvis mercilessly slaughtered him and all of his friends with the exception of Yuugo and Lucas whom barely managed to escape alive.

Flore (フロール, Furōru)
Flore was a girl who was born and raised at Glory Bell Orphanage. Thirteen years ago, she escaped from the orphanage, along with Yuugo, Lucas, and sixteen other kids. After escaping from Glory Bell Orphanage, Flore and her friends took refuge at Shelter B06-32 before deciding to travel to the human reserve in hopes of finding William Minerva. On the way there, Flore and her friends were captured by the Poachers who brought them to Goldy Pond. Once there, Leuvis mercilessly slaughtered her and all of her friends with the exception of Yuugo and Lucas whom barely managed to escape alive.

Pedro (ペドロ, Pedoro)
Pedro was a boy who was born and raised at Glory Bell Orphanage. Thirteen years ago, he escaped from the orphanage, along with Yuugo, Lucas, and sixteen other kids. After escaping from Glory Bell Orphanage, Pedro and his friends took refuge at Shelter B06-32 before deciding to travel to the human reserve in hopes of finding William Minerva. On the way there, Pedro and his friends were captured by the Poachers who brought them to Goldy Pond. Once there, Leuvis mercilessly slaughtered him and all of his friends with the exception of Yuugo and Lucas whom barely managed to escape alive.

Jatte (ジャッテ, Jatte)
Jatte was a boy who was born and raised at Glory Bell Orphanage. Thirteen years ago, he escaped from the orphanage, along with Yuugo, Lucas, and sixteen other kids. After escaping from Glory Bell Orphanage, Jatte and his friends took refuge at Shelter B06-32 before deciding to travel to the human reserve in hopes of finding William Minerva. On the way there, Jatte and his friends were captured by the Poachers who brought them to Goldy Pond. Once there, Leuvis mercilessly slaughtered him and all of his friends with the exception of Yuugo and Lucas whom barely managed to escape alive.

Hilda (ヒルダ, Hiruda)
Hilda was a girl who was born and raised at Glory Bell Orphanage. Thirteen years ago, she escaped from the orphanage, along with Yuugo, Lucas, and sixteen other kids. After escaping from Glory Bell Orphanage, Hilda and her friends took refuge at Shelter B06-32 before deciding to travel to the human reserve in hopes of finding William Minerva. On the way there, Hilda and her friends were captured by the Poachers who brought them to Goldy Pond. Once there, Leuvis mercilessly slaughtered her and all of her friends with the exception of Yuugo and Lucas whom barely managed to escape alive.

Bess (ベス, Besu)
Bess was a girl who was born and raised at Glory Bell Orphanage. Thirteen years ago, she escaped from the orphanage, along with Yuugo, Lucas, and sixteen other kids. After escaping from Glory Bell Orphanage, Bess and her friends took refuge at Shelter B06-32 before deciding to travel to the human reserve in hopes of finding William Minerva. On the way there, Bess and her friends were captured by the Poachers who brought them to Goldy Pond. Once there, Leuvis mercilessly slaughtered her and all of her friends with the exception of Yuugo and Lucas whom barely managed to escape alive.

Stacie (ステイシー, Suteishī)
Stacie was a girl who was born and raised at Glory Bell Orphanage. Thirteen years ago, she escaped from the orphanage, along with Yuugo, Lucas, and sixteen other kids. After escaping from Glory Bell Orphanage, Stacie and her friends took refuge at Shelter B06-32 before deciding to travel to the human reserve in hopes of finding William Minerva. On the way there, Stacie and her friends were captured by the Poachers who brought them to Goldy Pond. Once there, Leuvis mercilessly slaughtered her and all of her friends with the exception of Yuugo and Lucas whom barely managed to escape alive.

== Ancestors ==
Julius Ratri (ユリウス・ラートリー, Yuriusu Rātorī)
Julius Ratri is the ancestor of James and Peter Ratri, and is the human responsible for forging "The Promise" with the monsters called demons. After years of fighting in a war with demons, Julius had had enough of seeing the world, his family, friends, and comrades killed and eaten. He offered a deal with the demons to end the slaughter, which is known as "The Promise". The world would be divided in two and each race would live on its side without anyone being allowed to cross the worlds, thus each race has its own territory. However, in order for the demons to accept his proposal, he had to allow a certain portion of humans to remain in the demon world. An offering to satisfy the demons' need to eat humans, to preserve their race and for their monster nature. This led to Julius betraying his allies when they refused to let a certain portion of humans remain as an offering to the demons. In return, মশ্লয় made Julius and all of his descendants respect the human side of the market and work with the demons to oversee the farming system. They must also work together with the demon government to advance the evolution of demonic society and prevent children from escaping.

Orange-haired man (オレンジ色の髪の男, Orenji-iro no kami no otoko)
Orange-haired man is a placeholder name for an unnamed man who is a former ally of Julius Ratri, who due to the latter's sacrifice to end the war between demons and humans, became one of humanity's first cattle. Nearly a thousand years ago, he was a leader of an unknown country who was caught up in a war between the humans and demons. At some point, he met five other human leaders on the battlefield, including Julius Ratri, and they all became trusted companions, putting aside nations and races to fight together. One night after a whole day of fighting with countless casualties, the six leaders discussed about how to end the war. Julius proposed to the idea about offering up a portion of humans to the demons, but the man and the other four leaders were against this, deeming that it was possible to end the war without any human getting eaten. A few days later, Julius once again brought up his previous proposal and wanted his allies to reconsider it, sick and tired of continuously having to sacrifice people. His allies refused once again. Julius, however, betrayed them, and brought several demons to their hideouts, revealing that he had already made a deal with "Him" which became known as "The Promise". He was a man with a rather tall stature and large build. He had short, orange and messy hair, sticking up at all angles around his head. He also had a small goatee and large, light-colored eyes. He was a very courageous man who believed that in order to protect everyone, humans had to detach from thinking about races, nations, and ranks to unite as one. He was also very compassionate and cared deeply about his allies, refusing to let them suffer on their own. Due to his optimism and incredible ability to encourage his fellow leaders, he grew to be a "leader" among his allies along with Julius. He is the ancestor of Emma and Sienna.

Black-haired man (黒髪の男, Kurokami no otoko)
Black-haired man is a placeholder name for an unnamed man who is a former ally of Julius Ratri, who due to the latter's sacrifice to end the war between demons and humans, became one of humanities' first cattle. Nearly a thousand years ago, he was a leader of an unknown country who was caught up in a war between the humans and demons. At some point, he met five other human leaders on the battlefield, including Julius Ratri, and they all became trusted companions, putting aside nations and races to fight together. One night after a whole day of fighting with countless casualties, the six leaders discussed about how to end the war. Julius proposed to the idea about offering up a portion of humans to the demons, but the man and the other four leaders were against this, deeming that it was possible to end the war without any human getting eaten. A few days later, Julius once again brought up his previous proposal and wanted his allies to reconsider it, sick and tired of continuously having to sacrifice people. His allies refused once again. Julius, however, betrayed them, and brought several demons to their hideouts, revealing that he had already made a deal with "Him" which became known as "The Promise". He was a slim adult man with an average build and height with dark-colored eyes and long, straight black hair which he wore in a ponytail at the back. He was a level-headed and rational man who was both moved by his allies' idealism, but also acknowledged that Julius made several logical points in his proposal to sacrifice a portion of humans. Nevertheless, he still had strong morals and deemed the proposal as a rational judgment that was sorely lacking in morality. He is the ancestor of Ray and Isabella.

White-haired woman (白髪の女性, Shiraga no josei)
White-haired woman is a placeholder name for an unnamed woman who is a former ally of Julius Ratri, who, due to the latter's sacrifice to end the war between demons and humans, became one of humanities' first cattle. Nearly a thousand years ago, she was a leader of an unknown country who was caught up in a war between the humans and demons. At some point, she met five other human leaders on the battlefield, including Julius Ratri, and they all became trusted companions, putting aside nations and races to fight together. One night after a whole day of fighting with countless casualties, the six leaders discussed about how to end the war. Julius proposed to the idea about offering up a portion of humans to the demons, but the woman and the other four leaders were against this, deeming that it was possible to end the war without any human getting eaten. A few days later, Julius once again brought up his previous proposal and wanted his allies to reconsider it, sick and tired of continuously having to sacrifice people. His allies refused once again. Julius, however, betrayed them, and brought several demons to their hideouts, revealing that he had already made a deal with "Him" which became known as "The Promise". She was a fair-skinned, slim woman with long, straight white hair with braided bangs and light-colored eyes. She was a deeply compassionate woman who cared for the well-being of her allies above all else. She also had strong thinking skills and was very perceptive and emotionally insightful, understanding other people's thoughts and feelings very well and being able to grasp the severity of a situation rather quickly. She is the ancestor of Norman and Matilda.

Bearded man (あごひげを生やした男, Agohige o hayashita otoko)
Bearded man is a placeholder name for an unnamed man who is a former ally of Julius Ratri, who due to the latter's sacrifice to end the war between demons and humans, became one of humanities' first cattle. Nearly a thousand years ago, he was a leader of an unknown country who was caught up in a war between the humans and demons. At some point, he met five other human leaders on the battlefield, including Julius Ratri, and they all became trusted companions, putting aside nations and races to fight together. One night after a whole day of fighting with countless casualties, the six leaders discussed about how to end the war. Julius proposed to the idea about offering up a portion of humans to the demons, but the man and the other four leaders were against this, deeming that it was possible to end the war without any human getting eaten. A few days later, Julius once again brought up his previous proposal and wanted his allies to reconsider it, sick and tired of continuously having to sacrifice people. His allies refused once again. Julius, however, betrayed them, and brought several demons to their hideouts, revealing that he had already made a deal with "Him" which became known as "The Promise". He was an extremely tall man with a very large build who had dark-colored eyes, thick eyebrows, and long, wavy light-colored hair which fell down to below his shoulders. He had a very thick and long beard that covered the lower portion of his face. He was a loud man who was very upfront with his feelings. At the same time, he was very optimistic and never even considered the idea about giving up, no matter how bleak the situation looked.

Bald man (ハゲ男, Hage otoko)
Bald man is a placeholder name for an unnamed man who is a former ally of Julius Ratri, who, due to the latter's sacrifice to end the war between demons and humans, became one of humanities' first cattle. Nearly a thousand years ago, he was a leader of an unknown country who was caught up in a war between the humans and demons. At some point, he met five other human leaders on the battlefield, including Julius Ratri, and they all became trusted companions, putting aside nations and races to fight together. One night after a whole day of fighting with countless casualties, the six leaders discussed about how to end the war. Julius proposed to the idea about offering up a portion of humans to the demons, but the man and the other four leaders were against this, deeming that it was possible to end the war without any human getting eaten. A few days later, Julius once again brought up his previous proposal and wanted his allies to reconsider it, sick and tired of continuously having to sacrifice people. His allies refused once again. Julius, however, betrayed them, and brought several demons to their hideouts, revealing that he had already made a deal with "Him" which became known as "The Promise". He was a tall dark skinned man with a bald head and dark-colored eyes. He was a level-headed, calm and rational man. At times, he could be quite blunt, but nonetheless cared for his allies deeply and had a deep sense of right and wrong.

== Others ==
Ayshe (アイシェ, Aishe)
Ayshe is a 13-year-old girl who was born at one of the Premium Farms, but due to her physical defects, she was planned to be disposed of shortly after being born. One of the demons working at the plantation, whose job was to dispose of human infants born with physical defects, thought he saw himself in Ayshe because of their faces: Ayshe had a huge birthmark covering the right side of her face, and the demon's right side was heavily disfigured as well. She was adopted by the demon who took her home as raised her as his daughter. Ayshe lived a very happy life with her adoptive father until he was killed by Norman and his group. Because of this, Ayshe willingly agreed to go with Norman to The Paradise Hideout, where she became an expert markswoman in order to one day avenge her father by killing his murderers.

Alex Mikhaylov (アレックスミハイロフ, Arekkusumihairofu)
Alex Mikhaylov is an old human man living alone in the Human World who takes Emma in and gives her supplies and a place to stay after she developed amnesia due to the promise she forged with "Him". Alex's name is revealed in "The Promised Neverland offscene 027". It's also revealed in the offscene that Alex is the one who wrote the book "The Mechanical Engineering and Human History" which has a copy placed in Grace Field House's library. Alex once lived a happy life with his wife and daughter in a cold country which no longer exists. He also had some friends he cherished. However, he lost his family and all of his friends in a war; he was the only one who survived. He has since lived alone in his home, spending his days honoring his deceased family members and friends. Alex is an elderly man with a tall and full-bodied stature. He has wavy, ear-length, light-colored hair with a long beard and mustache. He is often seen wearing fur coats with different patterns. Alex is a very kind, caring, and level-headed man who is always ready to lend people a hand. This is emphasized when he took Emma in and gave her a safe place to stay after she forgot all about herself and her memories. He is patient with her amnesia and hopes that she will one day regain her memories and reunite with her forgotten family.

Smee (スミー, Sumī)
Voiced by Jake Eberle
Smee is the alias of a man whose real name is unknown. Smee is a human scientist who formerly worked for the demons. He is shown wearing circular glasses and a lab coat. He is also a friend of Norman's whom he met at Lambda. In the omake, it's revealed that when Krone was still a child at Grace Field House, she one day released a lantern into the sky with a note attached asking the receiver what the outside world is like. After the lantern fell onto the ground somewhere outside Grace Field, Smee found the note, when he realized it was from one of the children, he called the note interesting. Years later, during Krone's training days as a caretaker at Grace Field Headquarters, Smee would purposely drop a Promised Pen along a hallway for Krone to find, choosing her as the next user of the pen and entrusting her to make use of the pen's abilities (which she did not manage to find out). A few years later, when Norman was held at Lambda, Smee lent the latter help as they sought to destroy the facility, though the two succeeded in doing so, Smee was killed during a purge orchestrated by Peter Ratri.

Rita (リタ, Rita)
Rita is a character who only appears in the special chapter, We Were Born. Rita is a young orphan girl who was abandoned in front of a church when she was a baby and because of that she tries to be useful to others. Mr. Mendel plans to kill her in order to save his daughter Margo's life. Rita is a kind girl with short blonde hair.

Leo (レオ, Reo)
Leo is a character who only appears in the special chapter, We Were Born. Leo is a gangster boy whom, after getting in a fight, was shot and saved from dying by Rita. Rita is a girl who was about to sacrifice herself for a young girl named Margo be saved, but Leo saved Rita from dying. Leo has short dark hair and a scar on his forehead.

Margo (マーゴ, Māgo)
Margo is a character who only appears in the special chapter, We Were Born. Margo is a young girl who is suffering from an illness that will kill her before she becomes an adult. Her father, Mr. Mendel plans to sacrifice another child named Rita in order to save Margo's life.

Mr. Mendel (メンデル氏, Menderu-shi)
Mr. Mendel is a character who only appears in the special chapter, We Were Born. Mr. Mendel is the father of Margo. He loves his daughter very much and will do anything to save her, including killing another child named Rita.
