= Ray (The Promised Neverland) =

Fictional character from The Promised Neverland

- The Promised Neverland character
- Ray, as illustrated by Posuka Demizu
- First appearance: The Promised Neverland Chapter 1: "Grace Field House" (GFハウス, Gurēsu Fīrudo Hausu)
- Last appearance: The Promised Neverland Chapter 181: "Beyond Destiny" (運命の向こう岸, Unmei no Mukōgishi)
- Created by: Kaiu Shirai
- Designed by: Posuka Demizu
- Portrayed by: Kairi Jo; Ruito Yamashiro
- Voiced by: Japanese: Mariya Ise; English: Laura Stahl

In-universe information
- Alias: Sleepy Cyclops
- Species: Human
- Gender: Male
- Title: 81194
- Relatives: Emma; Norman; Isabella
- Age: 11
- Eye color: Dark Green

Ray (Japanese: レイ, Hepburn: Rei) is a character in the manga series The Promised Neverland, created by Kaiu Shirai and Posuka Demizu. Ray is an 11-year-old boy living at Grace Field House. Like Emma and Norman, Ray consistently gets perfect scores on his daily exams. He is known for being an avid reader with high intellectual abilities, blunt skepticism and cunning.

In the anime adaptation, he is voiced by Mariya Ise in Japanese and by Laura Stahl in the English version. In the live-action film adaptation, he is portrayed by Kairi Jo and Ruito Yamashiro.

Ray has ranked highly in various awards and polls. In 2020, he was awarded the Joint Character Wildcard at the 6th Anime Trending Awards. He was also praised for his character development and for his important role in the series.

== Creation ==
Early sketches and design of Ray by Posuka Demizu, in the artbook The Promised Neverland: World.

According to Kaiu Shirai, Ray, unlike his siblings, has an opposite and darker personality. He is more extreme than the rest of his family. He is the darkness, compare to Emma the sun, and Norman the moon. Ray is the favorite character of Kaiu Shirai, according to the author, they have things in common, explaining how the way he tends to get desperate and throw in the towel is a lot like the personality of Ray. Shirai revealed that in his original script, Ray was originally going to die. Seeing as how he nearly burned himself down with Grace Field House in retaliation against Isabella and the demons, he could have died before his siblings even escaped. But he avoided this idea. Posuka Demizu considers Ray to be an easier and fast character to create compared to Norman and Emma. Even if he is the most deep and dark character of the main characters of the series. According to Demizu, The proposal where his eye was hidden was a casual sketch. She thought that it might give him more flow, a sort of shadow air and make him look cool.

=== Casting ===
In the anime adaptation, Ray is voiced by Mariya Ise in Japanese; and Laura Stahl voices the character in English. In the live-action film adaptation, Ray was portrayed by Kairi Jo in the original role, and by Ruito Yamashiro in his childhood.

== Appearances ==
=== In The Promised Neverland ===
Ray was born on January 15, 2034. At the beginning of the story on October 12, 2045, Ray is an 11-year-old boy living at Grace Field House orphanage. He has dark green eyes and messy short black hair with long bangs that are parted to the right and cover up much of the left side of his face. He wears the standard orphanage uniform- a white shirt and trousers along with plain shoes. An authentication number, 81194 is tattooed on his neck. As Ray grew up, he realized that there were inconsistencies between his own memories and the reality that spread before him in the orphanage, and eventually that helped him to discover the true purpose of Grace Field House.

Being the only biological son of their caretaker, Isabella, he did not experience childhood amnesia, confirming his suspicions about the existence of demons and true nature of the house later when he was 6 years old, the day when he has a beautiful voice when he first hummed Lesile's song. Ray becomes Isabella's spy in exchange for goods and the promise that he, Norman, and Emma will not get fed to demons until their 12th birthdays. He pledged to use the remaining years of his life to orchestrate an escape plan that would lead to his two siblings finding out the truth themselves. After a confrontation with Norman, he becomes the children's trump card just as Isabella betrays him. Although initially unwilling to accept Emma's unrealistic goal of escaping with every child, he vows to never give up on them after their escape succeeds. In 2047, Ray stopped wearing the standard uniform when he arrived at the shelter where he found new clothes. He began wearing long, black pants, a black shirt, and a long white-colored coat together with the old brown shoes he wore at the Grace Field House.

=== Appearances in other media ===
Ray appears in three of four light novel books of the series written by Nanao, illustrated by Posuka Demizu and supervised by Kaiu Shirai; as well as appearing in the comedic spin-off manga, Oyakusoku no Neverland (お約束のネバーランド), written and illustrated by Shuhei Miyazaki.

Ray appeared in two drama CDs released along with the anime series' first season Blu-ray disc, titled GF House Ghost Disturbance and Gift from the 39th Girl. The stories were originated from the novel A Letter from Norman. Ray also appeared in two other drama CDs titled The day Emma cried and Voice Time Capsule, released along with the anime series' second season Blu-ray disc. Ray is a playable character in the mobile game The Promised Neverland: Escape the Hunting Grounds released on iOS and Android. Ray is also a playable character in the crossover collaborations between The Promised Neverland and the smartphone video games Identity V, Jumputi Heroes, Dragon Egg, Vivid Army and LINE POP 2.

== Reception ==
=== Popularity ===
Ray was awarded the Joint Character Wildcard and was nominated for the Man of the Year category at the 6th Anime Trending Awards in 2020. Ray achieved the third place behind Norman and Emma in the Color Illustration Character Poll of the series in 2018. In the Weekly Shōnen Jump's popularity poll of the series in 2018, Ray ranked in third place. He also took third in the second popularity poll of the series, with a total of 4,651 votes.

=== Critical response ===
The scholar of British and American literature Kei Toda described the writing and character development of Ray as excellent, unique and well thought; she also praised his gender identity as a boy who can cook and wash his clothes, which is often the job of women, it is Ray-a boy, who has learned to cook delicious food for his brothers and sisters. Allen Moody of THEM Anime Reviews described Ray as "As for Ray, he is also taken some psychological damage from the place, and I was wondering how trustworthy he was- as apparently his pals Norman and Emma had been wondering too- but I liked Ray nevertheless (or maybe just felt sympathy for him); his soul was clearly damaged by the place, but maybe not damaged beyond redemption".

Brittany Vincent from Syfy praised the character by saying "Ray is an isolated child who typically shuns friends, but he is got a sharp intellect and a keen eye for his surroundings, a necessary skill in this bizarre world the group of orphaned children finds themselves living in". Pauline Croquet from the French newspaper Le Monde said that the design of the three main characters, including Ray, is very original and comes out of the shōnen manga typical designs; and stated "The children of Grace Field House, the oldest of whom are 11 years old, have lived since birth in an idyllic setting and are treated with love by the director, whom they call "Mom". The intelligent and resourceful Emma, Norman and Ray, will understand that they are all in danger of death. They decide to run away with their siblings, but they are completely unaware of what awaits them outside".

== Merchandising ==
Noitamina Shop & Cafe Theater held a cafe event and sold multiple merchandise of Ray, to commemorate his birthday in 2019. Other merchandise related to the character such as figurines, plush dolls, perfumes, mugs, and T-shirts have been created. A collaboration with Megane Flower glasses was held in March 2021, which included limited edition glasses frames designed after Ray, Norman, and Emma. Ray was also featured on a MasterCard credit card in 2022.

== See also ==
- List of The Promised Neverland characters
