= Kairi Jo =

Japanese actor

- 城 桧吏
- Born: September 6, 2006 (age 20); Tokyo, Japan
- Occupation: Actor
- Years active: 2014–present
- Agent: Stardust Promotion

Kairi Jo (城 桧吏, Jo Kairi; born September 6, 2006) is a Japanese male actor and singer. He is best known for his roles as Shota Shibata in Shoplifters (2018) and Ray in The Promised Neverland (2020).

== Filmography ==
=== Film ===
Year	Title	Role	Notes	Ref.
2018	Shoplifters	Shota Shibata		
2020	The Promised Neverland	Ray		
2021	Hokusai	Hokusai (boyhood)		
2021	Tom and Sawyer in the City	Naito Naitō	Lead role	
2022	Yokaipedia	Kazuki Sakamoto	Lead role	
2025	Who Cares?: The Movie	Kakeru Okita		
2025	The Best Friend	Xia Tian	Lead role; Chinese film	
2027	Leviathan	San Mikami		
2027	Kono Natsu, Dare mo Sukuenai Bokura wa, Sora ni Sakenda	Yu Hayase	Lead role	

=== Television ===
Year	Title	Role	Notes	Ref.
2018	Segodon	Saigō Kikujirō (young)	Taiga drama	
2018	Good Doctor	Hibiki Hayama	Episode 5	
2023	Kazama Kimichika: Kyojo Zero	Shogo Karube	Episode 6	
2023	Shinrei Naikai Inao Chisei	Junichi Shimizu	Episode 1	
2024	Who Cares?	Kakeru Okita		
2025	Asura	Hiroo Satomi		
2025	Last Samurai Standing	Sayama Shinnosuke		
2025	Unbound	Tokugawa Ienari	Taiga drama	
2026	Shadows of the Ten Ninja	Sanada Daisuke		
