= Emma (The Promised Neverland) =

Fictional character from The Promised Neverland

- The Promised Neverland character
- Emma, as illustrated by Posuka Demizu
- First appearance: The Promised Neverland Chapter 1: "Grace Field House" (GFハウス, Gurēsu Fīrudo Hausu)
- Last appearance: The Promised Neverland Chapter 181: "Beyond Destiny" (運命の向こう岸, Unmei no Mukōgishi)
- Created by: Kaiu Shirai
- Designed by: Posuka Demizu
- Portrayed by: Minami Hamabe
- Voiced by: Japanese: Sumire Morohoshi; English: Erica Mendez

In-universe information
- Alias: Antenna
- Species: Human
- Gender: Female
- Title: 63194
- Relatives: Ray; Norman; Isabella
- Age: 11
- Eye color: Green

Emma (Japanese: エマ, Hepburn: Ema) is the main protagonist of the manga series The Promised Neverland, created by Kaiu Shirai and Posuka Demizu. Emma is an 11-year-old girl living at Grace Field House. Upon discovering the truth of the orphanage, Emma teams up with Norman and Ray to escape the house. She loves her family more than anything and her strong sense of selflessness insists that everyone escape together.

In the anime adaptation, she is voiced by Sumire Morohoshi in Japanese, and by Erica Mendez in the English version. In the live-action film adaptation, she is portrayed by Minami Hamabe.

Emma has ranked highly in various awards and polls. In 2019, she was awarded the Best Female Character at the 41st Anime Grand Prix. She was also praised for her gender, original design, character development and for breaking the typical mold of a feminine protagonist.

== Creation ==
Early sketches and design of Emma by Posuka Demizu, in the artbook The Promised Neverland: World.

According to the author Kaiu Shirai, he avoided making her too plain. Shirai made Emma as a female protagonist because the first antagonist of the story, Isabella, is also a female, thinking that the mother-daughter relationship between the two would make the story "more interesting". She had two options, either escape with her siblings or become a mother in Grace Field House. He further said that she is not a boy and does not have extraordinary physical abilities nor special powers, that breaks the Shōnen Jump mold of protagonist. Shirai describes Emma as energetic, "like light," kind of motherly, and idealistic. She keeps the balance between Norman, who supports her, and Ray, who argues but helps anyway. Posuka Demizu described the creation of the character as "the story of The Promised Neverland needed a different kind of main protagonist", like Emma, so she came naturally. Demizu further explained that it was not necessary for her to follow the Jump style. Demizu also said that Emma is one of the hardest characters to draw, as drawing her for every panel takes the most time to finish.

=== Casting ===
In the anime adaptation, Emma is voiced by Sumire Morohoshi in Japanese. Erica Mendez voices the character in the English version of the series. In the live-action film adaptation, she was portrayed by Minami Hamabe.

== Appearances ==
=== In The Promised Neverland ===
Being one of the smartest children living at the orphanage, Emma is considered as one of Grace Field House's three "Premium quality goods" along with Norman and Ray, at the third plant of the house. She was born on August 22, 2034. She has green eyes and short light orange hair that sticks up in all angles around her head with a single long lock of hair curving upwards from the right side of her head, resembling an antenna, and another smaller one from the base of her neck. Like Ray and Norman, Emma consistently gets perfect scores on her daily exams at the Grace Field orphanage. At the beginning of the story on October 12, 2045, Emma is 11 years old, and wears the uniform of Grace Field House: a shirt, a white skirt and brown shoes. An authentication number, 63194 is tattooed on her neck.

During the escape from the orphanage, she cut off her right ear to prevent Isabella from finding them, in which she wore a bandage to cover the wound the whole time. After her adventure at the demon world, she wears various outfits more suited to adventure and exploration.

=== Appearances in other media ===
Emma appears in three of four light novel books of the series written by Nanao, illustrated by Posuka Demizu and supervised by Kaiu Shirai; as well as appearing in the comedic spin-off manga, Oyakusoku no Neverland (お約束のネバーランド), written and illustrated by Shuhei Miyazaki. Emma appeared in two drama CDs released along with the anime series' first season Blu-ray disc, titled GF House Ghost Disturbance and Gift from the 39th Girl. The stories were originated from the novel A Letter from Norman. Another two drama CDs that explores other aspects of Emma's life in Grace Field House, titled The day Emma cried and Voice Time Capsule, were also released along with the anime series' second season Blu-ray disc.

Emma is a playable character in the mobile game The Promised Neverland: Escape the Hunting Grounds released on iOS and Android. Emma is also a playable character in the crossover collaborations between The Promised Neverland and the smartphone video games Identity V, Jumputi Heroes, Dragon Egg, Vivid Army and LINE POP 2.

== Reception ==
=== Popularity ===
Emma was awarded the Best Female Character at the 41st Anime Grand Prix in 2019. She was nominated for Best Protagonist and Best Girl at the 4th Crunchyroll Anime Awards in 2020. She was also nominated for the Girl of the Year category at the 6th Anime Trending Awards in 2020. Emma achieved the second place behind Norman in the Color Illustration Character Poll of the series in 2018. In the Weekly Shōnen Jump's popularity poll of the series in 2018, Emma ranked in first place. She also took first in the second popularity poll of the series, with a total of 5,581 votes.

=== Critical response ===
Emma has received widespread critical acclaim from professionals in the industry, writers, reviewers and critics. Aya Kikuchi from the Japanese website Real Sound described her as:

She is a girl and the main character, is the reason why The Promised Neverland is serialized in Weekly Shōnen Jump, and I consider her to be a symbol. In this story, Emma is portrayed as a girl who fulfills the conditions of the hero image. But it is not just her gender that makes her look like a new hero. As you can see from the setting that she is an excellent child who clears super-difficult tests every day, Emma is a brain with extraordinary physical ability. She has a naive and mood maker side, but she can see the difficulties that are far ahead from the beginning. Death that exists next to each other, a situation in which a small mistake by one person can lead to many casualties, and children who are always in danger. All the factors are in demons, and they have been portrayed as hateful things. However, as Emma learns about the world of demons, she can no longer ignore the fact that they have the same life as her. She wonders if there is a difference between her hunting and eating beasts and demons eating humans. And the story moves towards the final phase centering on Norman, who wants to annihilate the demons, and Emma, who does not want neither humans nor demons to die. Emma is a rare and compelling new hero who makes it possible, a hope in a hopeless story. The Promised Neverland has ended, but it is not too late to get addicted to this world that gave birth to a new hero.

Emma was also well received by the professor of global Japanese studies at Meiji University, Yukari Fujimoto and by the manga artist Morizono Milk, which both highlighted the good fact to have a female protagonist in a manga published in Weekly Shōnen Jump; with Morizonu stating "I knew that this work was serialized in shōnen Jump magazine, but I did not know that Yukari Fujimoto pointed out that this is the first manga that has a girl as the main character in this way. In that sense as well, I think the achievement of this manga, in which the main character is Emma was a big hit, it is great". The scholar of British and American literature Kei Toda explained that Emma is "unlike a so-called feminine heroine", and at the same time "she can not be described as completely boyish either". Toda said that Emma is a "character depicted with both masculine and feminine elements", she also praised the character for being a unique heroine. Toda concluded with "Emma breaks the common depiction of masculinity and femininity that was subconsciously present in manga series, and solves seemingly unsolvable problems in a way that is not bound by common sense. If we consider the socially constructed view of men and women to be some sort of common sense, Emma released herself from the boundaries of gender role, she can make the impossible possible. It can be said that Emma has a flexible thinking power. If Emma was portrayed traditionally as a brave and athletic boy or as a feminine girl, she would be a character without innovative thinking, therefore lacking her unique persuasiveness". Author Kimiyo Ogawa stated that Emma, who has a certain privilege among edible children, always lives based on her family and their qualia. When escaping from the farm, the plan's success rate would have been higher if the weaker people with lower athletic ability were discarded, but Emma chose not to abandon the weaker ones.

Rebecca Silverman from Anime News Network praised her strong role in the storyline of the series, and stated "Emma herself stands to be a very strong figure. She has the heart needed to get things done. She is the one who refuses to leave anyone behind, the one who understands that family is important, and ultimately the person who does the most growing even over the course of just one book. To say that Emma is the ray of light in this very dark story might be understating things a bit". Allen Moody of THEM Anime Reviews enjoyed the personality of Emma and describes her as "Emma, though, is the steadfast one- resolute, indomitable, yet compassionate, someone who can be bent by grief but is hard to actually break, someone whose toughness of spirit endures despite some devastating developments, a true leader and one of the most admirable characters I have come across in anime". Brittany Vincent for Syfy simply described Emma as "The lead protagonist of the series, Emma, hardly looks like your typical anime character at all, thanks to her shock of reddish, blonde hair and her wide eyes". Carlyle Edmundson from the Screen Rant website stated that since the original manga was already very different from the average Shonen Jump manga series, he felt that some concessions might need to be made to make it more appealing. As a result, putting Emma as the main character was the right call; saying "The Promised Neverland broke a lot of unspoken conventions by setting Emma as the protagonist, but that was key to the series' success in the end, proving that sometimes it's best for an artist to stick with what feels right for the story, rather than what's marketable". Tina Marie DeLucia from the same website describes Emma as a young and cheerful protagonist, she also said that Emma has all the qualities of a lead: a drive, a devotion to a cause or family, and the desire to better the world and herself. She offers the "promise" of new genres of protagonists.

The French website Melty praised her development through the whole manga, especially at the Goldy Pond and Seven Walls story arcs, saying that it had a huge impact on the development and environment of the story. Pauline Croquet from the French newspaper Le Monde said that the design of the three main characters, including Emma, is very original and comes out of the shōnen manga typical character designs; and praised how the creators handled her character development and personality. Vincent Jule of the French newspaper 20 minutes praised her role as one of a few female main characters of a manga published in a shōnen magazine. Explaining that "manga heroines were mostly shōjo heroines, and if they managed to find a place in a shônen magazine, it was most often with masculine attributes: the badass, the fight and sometimes the sexy". He further said that Emma has changed this situation, by her unique character design, leadership and good characterization, that makes her stand out from the other characters. Flavien Appavou from the French website EcranLarge mentioned that her "face and her conviction allow you to bond with her very quickly", and "it is through her personality that the manga finds its originality". He also described her as an original character that does not look like a typical main character at all.

== Merchandising ==
Good Smile Company launched a Nendoroid figure based on the character from the series in September 2019. Noitamina Shop & Cafe Theater held a cafe event and sold multiple merchandise of Emma, to commemorate her birthday in 2019. Emma did a crossover with the WIXOSS trading card game in April 2019, which included an expansion pack themed to the series. Other merchandise related to the character such as figurines, plush dolls, perfumes, mugs, and T-shirts have been created. A collaboration with Megane Flower glasses was held in March 2021, which included limited edition glasses frames designed after Emma, Ray, and Norman. Emma was also featured on a MasterCard credit card in 2022.

== See also ==
- List of The Promised Neverland characters
