= Norman (The Promised Neverland) =

Fictional character from The Promised Neverland

- The Promised Neverland character
- Norman, as illustrated by Posuka Demizu
- First appearance: The Promised Neverland Chapter 1: "Grace Field House" (GFハウス, Gurēsu Fīrudo Hausu)
- Last appearance: The Promised Neverland Chapter 181: "Beyond Destiny" (運命の向こう岸, Unmei no Mukōgishi)
- Created by: Kaiu Shirai
- Designed by: Posuka Demizu
- Portrayed by: Rihito Itagaki
- Voiced by: Japanese: Maaya Uchida; English: Jeannie Tirado

In-universe information
- Aliases: William Minerva; Boss
- Species: Human
- Gender: Male
- Title: 22194
- Relatives: Emma; Ray; Isabella
- Age: 11
- Eye color: Blue

Norman (Japanese: ノーマン, Hepburn: Nōrman) is a character in the manga series The Promised Neverland, created by Kaiu Shirai and Posuka Demizu. Norman is an 11-year-old boy living at Grace Field House. Like Ray and Emma, Norman consistently gets perfect scores on his daily exams. He is known for being a genius strategist and planner, as well as unbeatable at the game of tag. He discovers the truth of the orphanage with Emma and teams up with Ray to devise a plan to escape. While he knows leaving with every child in the house is near to impossible, his love for his beloved friend Emma pushes him to continue trying.

In the anime adaptation, he is voiced by Maaya Uchida in Japanese and by Jeannie Tirado in the English version. In the live-action film adaptation, Norman is portrayed by Rihito Itagaki.

== Creation ==
Early sketches and design of Norman by Posuka Demizu, in the artbook The Promised Neverland: World.

According to Kaiu Shirai, Norman is the mainstay of the group and had a "lighter" mood compare to Ray and Emma. For his character design, Shirai asked for something like angelic, and a bit ethereal, with a simple design philosophy. Making him look like a moon or a knight of the story. Posuka Demizu had difficulties creating the character design of Norman, including his body type, face and hair. According to Demizu, Norman was supposed to be slender in his original design, but it was difficult to show the difference between him and the other children. All of them wear the same clothes, so she decided to maintain the current design.

=== Casting ===
In the anime adaptation, Norman is voiced by Maaya Uchida in Japanese; and Jeannie Tirado voices the character in English. In the live-action film adaptation, Norman was portrayed by Rihito Itagaki.

== Appearances ==
=== In The Promised Neverland ===
Norman was born on March 21, 2034. At the beginning of the story on October 12, 2045, Norman is 11-year-old boy living at Grace Field House orphanage. He has blue eyes and short white hair that is parted to his left, with a longer piece curving upwards on the left side of his head. An authentication number, 22194 is tattooed on his neck. As the most intelligent out of the three, he is the first to find out Ray's true identity as Isabella's spy and prepare various back-up plans and escape routes. After Ray is betrayed by Isabella, Norman is forced to be shipped before his 12th birthday, accepting his fate of inevitable death to deceive her and let the rest of the children escape.

However, instead of being put down, Norman is sent to a special research facility called Lambda Λ7214, it was created in order to try to create higher quality human livestock in a faster and more efficient way than the Premium Farms for the tifari ceremony. He escapes from Lambda and destroys the place after leading the other children held there in an uprising. Afterwards, he establishes a place called The Paradise Hideout for children they rescued from Lambda to live at and prepares a plan to wipe out all demons.

=== Appearances in other media ===
Norman appears in three of four light novel books of the series written by Nanao, illustrated by Posuka Demizu and supervised by Kaiu Shirai; as well as appearing in the comedic spin-off manga, Oyakusoku no Neverland (お約束のネバーランド), written and illustrated by Shuhei Miyazaki. Norman appeared in two drama CDs released along with the anime series' first season Blu-ray disc, titled GF House Ghost Disturbance and Gift from the 39th Girl. The stories were originated from the novel A Letter from Norman. Norman also appeared in two other drama CDs titled The day Emma cried and Voice Time Capsule, released along with the anime series' second season Blu-ray disc.

Norman is a playable character in the mobile game The Promised Neverland: Escape the Hunting Grounds released on iOS and Android. Norman is also a playable character in the crossover collaborations between The Promised Neverland and the smartphone video games Identity V, Jumputi Heroes, Dragon Egg, Vivid Army and LINE POP 2.

== Reception ==
=== Popularity ===
Norman was nominated for the Best Male Character category at the 41st Anime Grand Prix in 2019. He was also nominated for the Man of the Year category at the 6th Anime Trending Awards in 2020. Norman ranked at first place in the Color Illustration Character Poll of the series in 2018. In the Weekly Shōnen Jump's popularity poll of the series in 2018, Norman is in second place. He also took second in the second popularity poll of the series, with a total of 4,763 votes.

=== Critical response ===
The scholar of British and American literature Kei Toda described Norman as a perfect example of The Myth of Masculinity, she said that Norman at Grace Field House is depicted as a physically weak boy with a genius mind, she mentioned that Norman's transformation highlights the masculinity that he was trapped in, and the harshness of his fate when he branched off with Emma and the children. She also noted that Norman was written as a boy who is not masculine, contrasting Emma-a girl who is not feminine. Toda concluded with: "From the perspective of narration, Norman hiding his identity creates a mystery-is Minerva alive? What type of person is he? Who is boss? But it can also be said that, Norman sealed off his angelic and feeble past self and turned himself into a manly leader by taking the identity of Minerva. In fact, the appearance of Norman from the eyes of members from Λ7214 is "serious", "winter", "emperor"; an image far from the Norman Emma knew: "kind, smart and smiles warmly". Why did Norman grow so manly? It gradually becomes clear that he is not just a flatly written character of weak physical constitution and excellent academic records, but a three-dimensional person bearing the shadow of an oppression of unspeakable nature. Norman's subconscious longing for masculinity gradually emerges when he was surrounded by the cattle children trapped in experimental farm Λ7214. Norman does not use his real name in front of the rescued children. Instead, he takes the name of a key contributor in liberating edible children- James Ratri; and his codename William Minerva, while commonly being called the boss".

Brittany Vincent from Syfy praised the character and describes him as "Norman looks fragile but has a calm demeanor and quiet strength about him". Pauline Croquet from the French newspaper Le Monde said that the design of the three main characters, including Norman, is very original and comes out of the shōnen manga typical character designs; and stated "The children of Grace Field House, the oldest of whom are 11 years old, have lived since birth in an idyllic setting and are treated with love by the director, whom they call "Mom". The intelligent and resourceful Norman will understand that they are all in danger of death. They decide to run away with their siblings, but they are completely unaware of what awaits them outside".

== Merchandising ==
Good Smile Company launched a Nendoroid figure based on the character from the series in September 2019. Noitamina Shop & Cafe Theater held a cafe event and sold multiple merchandise of Norman, to commemorate his birthday in 2019. Other merchandise related to the character such as figurines, plush dolls, perfumes, mugs, and T-shirts have been created. A collaboration with Megane Flower glasses was held in March 2021, which included limited edition glasses frames designed after Norman, Ray, and Emma. Norman was also featured on a MasterCard credit card in 2022.

== See also ==
- List of The Promised Neverland characters
