= Rihito Itagaki =

Japanese actor (born 2002)

- 板垣 李光人
- Born: January 28, 2002 (age 24); Yamanashi Prefecture, Japan
- Occupations: Actor; model
- Years active: 2012–present
- Agent: Stardust Promotion
- Website: rihitoitagaki.jp

Rihito Itagaki (Japanese: 板垣 李光人, Hepburn: Itagaki Rihito; born January 28, 2002) is a Japanese actor and model. He is best known for portraying Heure in Kamen Rider Zi-O (2018), Norman in The Promised Neverland (2020), Meguru Sōma in My Androgynous Boyfriend (2021), and Sōma Tezuka in And Yet, You Are So Sweet (2023).

== Life and career ==
Itagaki was born on January 28, 2002, in Yamanashi Prefecture. He began modeling when he was two years old. In fifth grade, he passed the model audition for Stardust Promotion and joined the agency.

In 2018, Itagaki starred as Heure in Kamen Rider Zi-O, part of the Kamen Rider franchise. In 2020, he starred as Norman in The Promised Neverland. In 2021, Itagaki played his first lead role in My Androgynous Boyfriend as Meguru Sōma, an androgynous model and clothing store clerk. In 2023, he portrayed the character of Magoroku Inui in the cooking drama Fermat's Cuisine.

== Filmography ==
=== Film ===
Year	Title	Role	Notes	Ref.
2014	Tokyo Slaves	Ryūō Edogawa		
2014	The Last Soul	Yūichi Saeki (young)		
2015	Pirameki's Children Story	Shūhei Taniguchi		
2018	Rules of Evil and Masks	Fumihiro Kuki (young)		
2019	Rin	Kei Ishikura		
2020	The Promised Neverland	Norman		
2021	Horimiya	Akane Yanagi		
2021	Tsunagare Radio: Our Rainy Days	Selga		
2021	Zokki	Convenience store clerk		
2022	Lonely Castle in the Mirror	Subaru (voice)		
2023	And Yet, You Are So Sweet	Sōma Tezuka		
2024	Love You as the World Ends: The Final	Jin Amagi		
2024	The Yin Yang Master Zero	The emperor		
2024	Blue Period	Yotasuke Takahashi		
2024	Hakkenden: Fiction and Reality	Inusaka Keno		
2024	Cells at Work!	Junior Red Blood Cell (AA2153)		
2025	Babanba Banban Vampire	Rihito Tatsuno		
2025	Meets the World	Asahi		
2025	Peleliu: Guernica of Paradise	Hitoshi Tamaru (voice)	Lead role	
2026	The Mouths	Shota Murai	Lead role	

=== Television ===
Year	Title	Role	Notes	Ref.
2015	Burning Flower	Yoshida Shōin (young)	Taiga drama	
2017	My High School Business	Ryōta Okudera		
2018	Kamen Rider Zi-O	Heure		
2019	Cheers to Miki Clinic	Tsubasa Ameku		
2020	Alice in Borderland	Hikari Kuina (young)		
2021	Koko wa Ima kara Rinri Desu	Yukito Tokigawa		
2021	My Androgynous Boyfriend	Meguru Sōma	Lead role	
2021	Reach Beyond the Blue Sky	Tokugawa Akitake	Taiga drama	
2021	A School Where Students Can Start Over	Kakeru Nogi		
2021	I'll Do It Right in the Next Life	Leopold Imori	Guest role	
2021	Run Through Beyond the Wind	Makoto Kizaki		
2022	Scary Picture Book (season 4): "Kappa"			
2022	Shijūkara	Chiaki Tachibana		
2022	Invisible	Mantarō "Ma-kun" Sawatari		
2022	Silent	Hikaru Aoba		
2023	Marriage is Difficult for a Ninja	Kazuki Yamada	Guest role	
2023	What Will You Do, Ieyasu?	Ii Naomasa	Taiga drama	
2023	Oh, Love Hotel: Secret	Tōru	Final episode	
2023	Fermat's Cuisine	Magoroku Inui		
2024	Mars	Konichi Aizawa		
2025	The Top Secret	Tsuyoshi Maki	Lead role	
2025–26	The Ghost Writer's Wife	Sannojo Ushimizu	Asadora	

== Awards and nominations ==
Year	Award	Category	Work(s)	Result	Ref.
2025	48th Japan Academy Film Prize	Newcomer of the Year	Hakkenden: Fiction and Reality, Cells at Work!, and The Yin Yang Master Zero	Won	
