= Gold (Uverworld song) =

Single by Uverworld

from the album Last
- B-side: Change; Minori
- Released: March 31, 2010
- Recorded: 2010
- Genre: Rock
- Length: 12:42
- Label: gr8! records
- Songwriter(s): Takuya∞, Akira
- Producer(s): Uverworld; Satoru Hiraide

Uverworld singles chronology
"Kanashimi wa Kitto" (2009)	"Gold" (2010)	"Qualia" (2010)

"Gold" (often stylized as "GOLD") is the 15th single by the Japanese rock band Uverworld. It was released on March 31, 2010. The second track of the single, "Change" is set to be the image song of the upcoming Mobile Suit Gundam 00 movie adaptation. Both regular and limited pressings include a Mobile Suit Gundam 00 illustration-wide cap sticker.

Sony Music Entertainment Japan has finished producing a 3-D version of the title track's music video. The company will be giving out 1,000 tickets to fans for a screening of the music video on April 17, 2010.

== Track listing ==
CD SRCL-7241/SRCL-7239～7240 (Limited pressing)
No.	Title	Lyrics	Music	Length
1.	"Gold"	Takuya∞	Takuya∞, Akira	4:04
2.	"Change" (The image song for the movie adaptation of Mobile Suit Gundam 00.)	Takuya∞	Takuya∞	3:52
3.	"Minori"	Takuya∞	Takuya∞	4:45
Total length:				12 mins 42 sec

DVD
No.	Title	Length
1.	"Uverworld classics vol.3 ＝" (The promotional video of "=". It was the third track from the band's fifth single, Shamrock.)
2.	"Uverworld Yokoku'hen (UVERworld 予告編, Uverworld Preview)" (A video previewing the release of their 5th album, Last.)
