= List of The Promised Neverland episodes =

- Starring: Sumire Morohoshi; Maaya Uchida; Mariya Ise; Shinei Ueki; Lynn; Yūko Kaida; Nao Fujita
- No. of episodes: 23

Release
- Original network: Fuji Television
- Original release: January 11, 2019 – March 26, 2021

The Promised Neverland anime television series is based on the manga series of the same name written by Kaiu Shirai and illustrated by Posuka Demizu. The anime series adaptation was announced in the 26th issue of Weekly Shōnen Jump on May 28, 2018. The series premiered on January 11, 2019, and airs on Fuji TV's late-night Noitamina anime programming block. The series is animated by CloverWorks and directed by Mamoru Kanbe, with Toshiya Ono handling series composition, Kazuaki Shimada handling character designs, and Takahiro Obata composing the series' music. The first season ran for 12 episodes. It is streamed on Amazon Video, but only in Japan, which is contrary to the contract that has Amazon having exclusive streaming rights to shows that have aired on Noitamina since Spring 2016, as Wakanim has exclusive streaming rights in France. UVERworld performed the series' opening theme song "Touch Off," while Cö shu Nie performed the series' ending theme songs "Zettai Zetsumei" (絶体絶命; "Desperate Situation") and "Lamp". Aniplex of America streamed the series on Crunchyroll, Hulu, FunimationNow, and Hidive, starting on January 9, 2019. The series is simulcasted on AnimeLab in Australia and New Zealand. On March 28, 2019, Adult Swim announced that the anime's first season would air on their Toonami programming block starting on April 14, 2019. (Note: Adult Swim lists the series as premiering on April 13, 2019 at 12:00 a.m. (24:00) EDT/PDT, which is effectively April 14.) Netflix started streaming the series on September 1, 2020, in the United States, Canada and Latin America.

A second season was announced in March 2019. Originally scheduled to premiere in October 2020, it was delayed due to the COVID-19 pandemic. The second season aired on Fuji TV's Noitamina from January 8 to March 26, 2021. The main staff and cast members returned to reprise their roles. Kiiro Akiyama performs the second season's opening theme song "Identity" (アイデンティティ, Aidentiti), while Myuk performs the second season's ending theme song "Mahō" (魔法; "Magic").

== Series overview ==
Season	Episodes	Originally released	
Season	Episodes	First released	Last released
1	12	January 11, 2019	March 29, 2019
2	11	January 8, 2021	March 26, 2021

== Episodes ==
=== Season 1 (2019) ===
No. overall	No. in season	Title (Note: The episode titles refer to the day the episode takes place in DDMMYY format, with the first episode beginning on 12 October 2045.)	Directed by	Written by	Storyboarded by	Original release date (Note: Episode 2 to 12 were available exclusively every Friday at 12:00 a.m. JST on Amazon Prime Video Japan, 55 minutes before the original air time on Fuji TV.)	English air date
1	1	"121045"	Hidekazu Hara	Toshiya Ono	Mamoru Kanbe	January 11, 2019 (Note: Episode 1 was released on January 10, 2019 at 12:00 a.m. JST on streaming platforms.)	April 14, 2019
2	2	"131045"	Yoshiki Kitai	Toshiya Ono	Kaito Asakura	January 18, 2019	April 21, 2019
3	3	"181045"	Satoshi Furuhashi	Toshiya Ono	Mamoru Kanbe	January 25, 2019	April 28, 2019
4	4	"291045"	Ryûta Kawahara	Chiaki Nagai	Kaito Asakura	February 1, 2019	May 5, 2019
5	5	"301045"	Kakushi Ifuku & Takahiro Harada	Chiaki Nagai	Yūki Itō	February 8, 2019	May 12, 2019
6	6	"311045"	Toshimasa Ishii	Toshiya Ono	Toshimasa Ishii	February 15, 2019	May 19, 2019
7	7	"011145"	Shōhei Yamanaka	Seiko Takagi	Mamoru Kanbe	February 22, 2019	May 26, 2019
8	8	"021145"	Aika Ikeda	Seiko Takagi	Kaito Asakura	March 1, 2019	June 2, 2019
9	9	"031145"	Hiroki Itai	Chiaki Nagai	Hiroki Itai	March 8, 2019	June 9, 2019
10	10	"130146"	Ayako Kurata	Seiko Takagi	Ayako Kurata	March 15, 2019	June 16, 2019
11	11	"140146"	Kaito Asakura	Toshiya Ono	Kaito Asakura	March 22, 2019	June 23, 2019
12	12	"150146"	Mamoru Kanbe & Yoshiki Kitai	Toshiya Ono	Mamoru Kanbe	March 29, 2019	June 30, 2019

=== Season 2 (2021) ===
No. overall	No. in season	Title	Directed by	Written by	Storyboarded by	Original release date	English air date
13	1	"Episode 1"	Takahiro Harada	Toshiya Ono	Mamoru Kanbe	January 8, 2021 (Note: Episode 1 was released on January 7, 2021 at 12:00 a.m. JST on streaming platforms and aired on January 8, 2021 at 2:10 a.m. JST, 45 minutes after the original air time on Fuji TV.)	April 11, 2021
14	2	"Episode 2"	Ayako Kurata	Toshiya Ono	Ayako Kurata	January 15, 2021	April 18, 2021
15	3	"Episode 3"	Yayoi Takano	Toshiya Ono	Yoshiki Kitai	January 22, 2021	April 25, 2021
16	4	"Episode 4"	Kakushi Ifuku	Toshiya Ono	Takahiro Miura	January 29, 2021	May 2, 2021
17	5	"Episode 5"	Takahiro Harada	Seiko Takagi & Nanao	Mamoru Kanbe	February 5, 2021	May 9, 2021
18	6	"Episode 6"	Yoshiki Kitai	Nanao	Yukiko Imai	February 19, 2021	May 16, 2021
19	7	"Episode 7"	Ōri Yasukawa	Nanao	Ayako Kurata	February 26, 2021	May 23, 2021
20	8	"Episode 8"	Hiroki Itai	Nanao	Hiroki Itai	March 5, 2021	May 30, 2021
21	9	"Episode 9"	Kakushi Ifuku, Sumito Sasaki & Takeshi Tomita	Nanao	Kakushi Ifuku	March 12, 2021	June 6, 2021
22	10	"Episode 10"	Ayako Kurata, Ryō Kodama & Shige Fukase	N/A	Ayako Kurata	March 19, 2021	June 13, 2021
23	11	"Episode 11"	Yukiko Imai, Yoshiki Kitai & Hiroki Itai	N/A	Yukiko Imai	March 26, 2021 (Note: This episode aired on March 26, 2021 at 2:05 a.m. JST, 40 minutes after the original air time on Fuji TV.)	June 20, 2021
