= Kimi no Suki na Uta =

"Kimi no Suki na Uta 君の好きなうた"

Single by Uverworld

from the album Bugright
- Released: November 15, 2006
- Genre: Rock
- Length: 12 min 26 s
- Label: gr8! records
- Songwriter(s): Takuya∞, Alice ice

Uverworld singles chronology
"'Shamrock'" (2006)	"Kimi no Suki na Uta 君の好きなうた" (2006)	"'Endscape'" (2007)

Kimi no Suki na Uta (君の好きなうた, The Song that You Like) is the sixth single released by Uverworld under the gr8! records label. The single was released on November 15, 2006 in two different formats, CD only and CD+DVD.

== Overview ==
Released over three months after their previous single Shamrock, Kimi no Suki na Uta was the last single to be released before the release of the band's second album. The title song was used as the theme song for the TBS drama Koisuru Hanikami from October 2006 to December 2006.

== Track listing ==
=== CD Format ===
1. "Kimi no Suki na Uta (君の好きなうた)" (TAKUYA∞) — 4:18
2. "Extreme" (TAKUYA∞) — 2:55
3. "Yasashisa no Shizuku (優しさの雫) (acoustic version)" (TAKUYA∞, Alice ice) — 5:05

=== CD+DVD Format ===
==== CD Portion ====
1. "Kimi no Suki na Uta (君の好きなうた)" (TAKUYA∞) — 4:18
2. "Extreme" (TAKUYA∞) — 2:55
3. "Yasashisa no Shizuku (優しさの雫) (acoustic version)" (TAKUYA∞, Alice ice) — 5:05

==== DVD Portion ====
1. "2006 Tour Documentary"

== Personnel ==
- TAKUYA∞ — vocals, rap, programming
- Katsuya — guitar, programming
- Akira — guitar, programming
- Nobuto — bass guitar
- Shintarou — drums

== Ranking ==
Oricon Sales Chart (Japan)

Release	Chart	Peak position	First week sales	Sales total	Chart run
15 November 2006	Oricon Daily Singles Chart	2			
15 November 2006	Oricon Weekly Singles Chart	2	42,565	72,527	12 weeks
