= Kanashimi wa Kitto =

Single by Uverworld
- B-side: Gekiha; Mikage-ishi single ver.
- Released: October 28, 2009
- Recorded: 2009
- Genre: Rock
- Label: gr8! records
- Songwriter(s): Takuya, Satoru Hirade
- Producer(s): Uverworld, Satoru Hirade

Uverworld singles chronology
| "Go-On" (2009) | "Kanashimi wa Kitto" (2009) | "Gold" (2010) |

"Kanashimi wa Kitto" is the 14th single released by the Japanese rock band Uverworld. Released on October 28, 2009, it reached #2 on Japanese Oricon Weekly Charts.

The song "Kanashimi wa Kitto" is the soundtrack of the Japanese television drama titled "Shōkōjo Seira" (based on A Little Princess), played by Shida Mirai.

== Track listing ==
=== CD ===
1. 哀しみはきっと (Kanashimi wa Kitto)
2. 撃破 (Gekiha)
3. 美影意志-single ver.- (Mikage-ishi single ver.)

=== DVD ===
1. Uverworld Classics Vol.2 Sora
2. AwakEve Tour '09 Additional Order (from 国立代々木競技場第一体育館 09.04.05)
- Groovy Groovy Groovy
- D-tecnoLife
