= Hakanaku mo Towa no Kanashi =

"Hakanaku mo Towa no Kanashi 儚くも永久のカナシ"

Single by Uverworld

from the album Awakeve
- Released: November 19, 2008
- Genre: Rock
- Label: gr8! records
- Songwriter(s): Katsuya, Takuya∞

Uverworld singles chronology
| "Koishikute" (2008) | "Hakanaku mo Towa no Kanashi 儚くも永久のカナシ" (2008) | "Go-On" (2009) |

"Hakanaku Mo Towa No Kanashi" (儚くも永久のカナシ, lit. Fleeting Yet Everlasting sorrow) is the twelfth single by the Japanese band Uverworld and was released on November 19, 2008. Limited edition version (manufactured until end of December 2008) contains Mobile Suit Gundam 00 version of the title song with the original cover.

This is the first single of the group to reach number one on the Japanese Oricon weekly charts.

== Track listing ==
=== CD ===
1. Hakanaku mo Towa no Kanashi (儚くも永久のカナシ, lit. Fleeting Yet Everlasting sorrow)
2. Taion (体温, lit. Body Temperature)
3. Halzion (ハルジオン, lit. Philadelphia Daisy)

=== DVD ===
1. Revolve
2. Empty96
3. Groovy Groovy Groovy

== Personnel ==
- TAKUYA∞ - vocals, rap, programming
- Katsuya - guitar, programming
- Akira - guitar, programming
- Nobuto - bass guitar
- Shintarou - drums
