= Koishikute =

Single by Uverworld

from the album Awakeve
- Released: 10 September 2008
- Genre: Rock
- Label: gr8! records
- Songwriter(s): Katsuya Andou, Takuya Shimizu

Uverworld singles chronology
"Gekidō/Just Break the Limit!" (2008)	"Koishikute" (2008)	"Hakanaku mo Towa no Kanashi" (2008)

"Koishikute" is the 11th Uverworld single, released on 10 September 2008. Despite being freestanding, the song peaked at #3 on Oricon Singles Chart, selling 52,000 copies in its first week. Overall, it has sold 68,000 copies. The song was their highest selling freestanding single until they released "7th Trigger" in 2012.

== Track listing ==
=== CD ===
1. "Koishikute" (恋いしくて)
2. "Kokorozashi" (志 -Kokorozashi-)
3. "over the stoic"

=== DVD ===
1. Just Break the Limit! (limited edition)
2. Uverworld Trailer

== Personnel ==
- TAKUYA∞ - vocals, rap, programming
- Katsuya - guitar, programming
- Akira - guitar, programming
- Nobuto - bass guitar
- Shintarou - drums
