= Shuichi Yoshida =

Japanese novelist

Shūichi Yoshida
- 吉田 修一
- Born: 14 September 1968 (age 58); Nagasaki, Nagasaki Prefecture, Japan
- Occupation: Novelist

Shūichi Yoshida (吉田 修一, Yoshida Shūichi; born 14 September 1968) is a Japanese novelist.

== Biography ==
Shūichi Yoshida was born in Nagasaki, and studied Business Administration at Hosei University. He won the Bungakukai Prize for New Writers in 1997 for his story "Saigo no Musuko", and the Akutagawa Prize in 2002 (the fifth time he'd been nominated for the prize) for "Park Life". In 2002 he also won the Yamamoto Shūgorō Prize for Parade, and for winning both literary and popular prizes Yoshida was seen as a crossover writer, like Amy Yamada or Masahiko Shimada. In 2003 he wrote lyrics for the song "Great Escape" on Tomoyasu Hotei's album, 'Doberman'. His 2007 novel, Akunin, won the Osaragi Jiro Prize and the Mainichi Publishing Culture Award, and was adapted into an award-winning 2010 film by Lee Sang-il. Another novel, Taiyo wa Ugokanai has been made into a 2020 film.

== Works in English translation ==
- Villain (original title: Akunin), trans. Philip Gabriel (London: Pantheon, 2010) ISBN 978-0-307-37887-3
- Parade (original title: Parēdo), trans. Philip Gabriel (London: Harvill Secker, 2014) ISBN 9781846552373

== Awards and nominations ==
Japanese Awards

- 1997 - Bungakukai Prize for New Writers: Saigo no Musuko (The Last Son)
- 2002 - Yamamoto Shūgorō Prize: Parēdo (Parade)
- 2002 - Akutagawa Prize: Pāku Raifu (Park Life)
- 2007 - Osaragi Jiro Prize: Villain
- 2007 - Mainichi Publishing Culture Award: Villain
- 2010 - Shiba Ryotaro Prize: Yokomichi Yonosuke (Yonosuke Yokomichi)

British Award

- 2011 - Longlisted for the Independent Foreign Fiction Prize: Villain

== Bibliography ==
=== Novels ===
- Parēdo (Parade) (パレード), 2002 (Parade, London: Harvill Secker, 2014)
- TōKyō Wankei (東京湾景), 2003
- Nagasaki Ranraku-Zaka (長崎乱楽坂), 2004
- Rando Māku (Landmark) (ランドマーク), 2004
- Shichi Gatsu Nijū Yokka Dōri (7月24日通り), 2004
- Hinata (ひなた), 2006
- Akunin (悪人), 2007 (Villain, London: Pantheon, 2010)
- Shizuka na Bakudan (静かな爆弾), 2008
- Sayonara Keikoku (さよなら渓谷), 2008
- Moto Shokukin (元職員), 2008
- Yokomichi Yonosuke (横道世之介), 2009
- Heisei Saru Kani Kassenzu (平成猿蟹合戦図), 2011
- Taiyō wa Ugokanai (太陽は動かない), 2012
- Rū (路（ルウ）), 2012
- Ai ni Ranbō (愛に乱暴), 2013
- Ikari (怒り), 2014
- Hashi o Wataru (橋を渡る), 2016
- Kokuhō (国宝), 2018
- Anju to Zushiō (アンジュと頭獅王), 2019
- Mizuumi no Onna-tachi (湖の女たち), 2020
- Miss Sunshine (ミス・サンシャイン), 2022

=== Short story collections ===
- Saigo no Musuko (最後の息子), 1999
- Nettaigyo (熱帯魚), 2001
- Pāku Raifu (Park Life) (パーク・ライフ), 2002
- Nichiyōbi tachi (日曜日たち), 2003
- Haru, Bānīzu de (春、バーニーズで), 2004
- Onna tachi wa Ni do Asobu (女たちは二度遊ぶ), 2006
- Hatsukoi Onsen (初恋温泉), 2006
- Urizun (うりずん), 2007
- Ano Sora no Shita de (あの空の下で), 2008
- Kyanserusareta Machi no Annai (キャンセルされた街の案内), 2009
- Sora no Bōken (空の冒険), 2010

== Adaptations ==
- Tōkyōwankei was adapted into a 2004 TV drama starring Yukie Nakama.
- Haru, Bānīzu de was made into a 2006 TV movie starring Hidetoshi Nishijima and Shinobu Terajima.
- Shichigatsu Nijūyokka Dōri was made into a 2006 film starring Takao Ōsawa and Miki Nakatani. It had the international English title Christmas on July 24th Avenue.
- Parade was adapted into a 2009 film starring Tatsuya Fujiwara, Shihori Kanjiya, and model/actress Karina. Its world premiere was held at Pusan International Film Festival 2009, including a sold-out panel with the five young stars.
- Villain was adapted into a 2010 film starring Satoshi Tsumabuki, Eri Fukatsu and Akira Emoto. It won five Japanese Academy awards in 2011.
- The Story of Yonosuke (2013) (Yokomichi Yonosuke)
- The Ravine of Goodbye (2013) (Sayonara Keikoku)
- Rage (2016) (Ikari)
- The Women in the Lakes (2024) (Mizuumi no Onna-tachi)
- Rude to Love (2024) (Ai ni Ranbō)
- Kokuho (2025)
