= Last Ranker =

2010 video game

- Developer: Imageepoch
- Publisher: Capcom
- Director: Kazuya Niinou
- Producer: Minae Matsukawa
- Artists: Tatsuya Yoshikawa; Shin Nagasawa
- Writer: Kazushige Nojima
- Composer: Yoko Shimomura
- Platform: PlayStation Portable
- Release: JP: 15 July 2010
- Genre: Role-playing
- Mode: Single-player

Last Ranker (Note: Rasuto Rankā (Japanese: ラストランカー)) is a 2010 role-playing video game developed by Imageepoch and published by Capcom for the PlayStation Portable. Set in a fantasy world where warriors are ranked by Bazalta, the world's ruling military and government who are dedicated to fighting hostile beings called the Evinos, the player controls protagonist Zig as he decides to enter Bazalta and reach its top ranks. He ends up allied with a rebel group and fighting against both Bazalta and the Evinos. Gameplay combines mission-based exploration, and combat featuring players controlling Zig in real-time during turn-based battles.

The game was created by director Kazuya Niinou, based on his love of tournament-style fights in shōnen manga and his wish to create a title fitting for Capcom's history of fighting games. The team featured industry veterans including Capcom producer Minae Matsukawa, illustrators Tatsuya Yoshikawa and Shin Nagasawa, and composer Yoko Shimomura. The scenario was created by Final Fantasy writer Kazushige Nojima, who also created supplemental novellas expanding on the narrative and characters.

The game remains exclusive to Japan, a fact attributed to the platform's weak market presence overseas. Last Ranker saw generally positive reviews from Japanese critics, with many citing its gameplay as standing out from other RPGs of the time. Debuting in the top ten best-selling titles of the week, it sold over 100,000 units during 2010. It was supported by two guidebooks, two manga, and two CD dramas written by Nojima.

== Gameplay ==
A battle from Last Ranker; protagonist Zig fights a Ranker battle with a rival.

Last Ranker is a role-playing video game where players take on the role of protagonist Zig as he battles his way through the ranks of the military group Bazalta. The game has Zig navigating 3D environments in towns and the countryside areas, fulfilling missions for Bazalta and unlocking new areas of the world as Zig's Ranker status improves within Bazalta. Zig can wear equipment and accessories that both change his appearance and alter his abilities and statistics. He can also equip two weapon types; a sword as his main weapon, and a subweapon.

The battle system, while grounded in turn-based mechanics, also uses real-time elements. Three types of battles appear; random encounters against monsters, battles against rival soldiers tied to Zig's battle rank, and boss battles. The battles play out in real-time, with Zig as sole playable character and the current enemy or enemy party attacking in turn; with multiple enemies, Zig can select which target to attack. Zig's attacks rely on a charging energy meter filled with a resource called SP. Different attack types use varying amounts of SP, with Zig being unable to do anything except block when he runs out of SP.

Zig uses his sword for standard and heavy attacks, with a secondary attack using the equipped subweapon tied to different combat styles; subweapons include a second sword, dagger, axe, gun or gauntlet. Zig can have two accessible pairings of main and sub weapon, with one being active at a time. Attacks can be chained together to create combos which deal higher damage. The player can also open quick command menus to use skills, and some attacks cause status ailments for Zig or the enemy such as poisoning or paralysis.

Ranker battles are triggered by soldiers who see and confront Zig during exploration. When defeated, Zig advances to the defeated soldier's rank. Losing the battle causes a game over. All Ranker characters have a "Break" gauge in battle which is lowered by different attacks. When the gauge is emptied, hits cause more damage. After winning a Ranker battle, they will be entered in an in-game encyclopedia. Following encounters with the more powerful Rankers in standard and boss encounters, Zig can learn their powerful finishing ability, which grants him that ability to assign to the command menu. Through battles Zig gains experience points, which increase his level and both raise his statistics and unlock more skill slots. Skill uses are limited in battle, and using the powerful "mystery" skills will use all skill points for that battle.

== Synopsis ==
=== Setting ===
Last Ranker is set in a fantasy world which is governed by the Warlord Organization Bazalta from the capital city Ghandoar. Governing the world through force, Bazalta organizes and trains an army of 100,000 fighters, using a ranking system to gauge experience and skill. Bazalta's leaders, the Seven Knights, are the strongest warriors in the world. Their stated goal is defending the world from the Evinos, an alien species which consume all life they find. Bazalta was founded by three families who fought the Evinos, the Bazaltas, the Salvatores, and the Cantaleras. The Cantalera, who possess mystical powers, were banished and became a nomadic tribe, then the Salvatores were destroyed in turn and left the Bazaltas in control of the Warlord Organization. A notable faction within the world is Anti-Bazalta, a rebel sect who oppose the Knights' ethos of dominating solely through force.

=== Characters ===
The main protagonist is Zig (Hiroshi Kamiya), a member of the Cantalera tribe who grows frustrated with their traditions and leaves to join Bazalta. He is initially opposed by his friend Faz (Yuichi Nakamura), son of the Cantalera leader. Zig joins Bazalta alongside Ren (Marina Inoue), a survivor of the Salvatore line seeking retribution and restoration for her line. A prominent side character is Missy (Kaori Nazuka), Faz's younger sister and another friend of Zig's who serves as the Cantalera tribe's shaman. Zig is initially recruited into Bazalta by Makis (Wataru Hatano), an assessor for new soldiers. He becomes a subordinate of Tylong (Hiroki Yasumoto), the strongest warrior below the Seven Knights and current head of a hated family controlling their own territory within Ghandoar. Key characters from the Anti-Bazalta faction are Igorida (Megumi Toyoguchi), a one-eyed warrior woman who knows forbidden truths about the world, and the gun-wielding Bazalta double-agent Galgano (Jun Fukuyama).

The central antagonists are the "Seven Knights", the most powerful fighters in Bazalta, forming a council which controls the world's military, politics and finances. Many have now fallen into corruption, using their positions for selfish ends. Those featured are Harth (Tomokazu Seki), the current strongest warrior who only wants to fight strong opponents; Yuli (Mitsuki Saiga), a ruthless tactician and current head of the Bazalta family; Rosa (Aya Endō), an archer dedicated to the Knights' original goals; Zebrilla (Banjō Ginga), a merchant who bought his way into the Knights; Norma (Kotono Mitsuishi), a seductive warrior who can use magic and possesses other bodies to prolong her life; and Sengoku (Rikiya Koyama), a warrior from an Eastern land dedicated to honing his abilities. The seventh Knight Barbaro, Galgano's father, is never seen in-game.

=== Plot ===
Zig, dissatisfied with the repetition of Cantalera's rituals without knowledge of its origins, leaves despite Faz's attempt to stop him. Found by Makis, he is taken to Ghandoar and inducted into Bazalta alongside Ren. After some initial missions, Zig is coerced into becoming a subordinate of Tylong, whom Ren initially hates, as part of Tylong's goal to become one of the Seven Knights. Zig is sent on a mission to discipline his own tribe, who defy Bazalta's rule and are suspected of aiding Anti-Bazalta. He arrives to find the entire tribe slaughtered by Bazalta forces before he arrived, later revealed to be the work of Yuli; Faz and Missy are the only ones to have escaped. He later clashes with Igorida and Galgano, learning from them of the Knights' corruption and a greater threat posed by the Evinos. He is also attacked by an embittered Faz, who was saved by Yuli and told that Zig betrayed the tribe's location. Faz now acts as Yuli's subordinate, later going on Yuli's orders to kill a small faction gathering around Ren's attempts to reclaim her family's status. Tylong also vanishes, and is branded as a traitor by Bazalta.

Zig and Ren are lured by Igorida into a meeting. There they find Makis, Tylong and Harth have defected to Anti-Bazalta to oppose the Knights' corruption. Igorida reveals that the Cantalera erected a magical barrier around the current inhabited world keeping the Evinos at bay, though a time of catastrophe when the Evinos will attack in strength is fast approaching; her forbidden knowledge came from Norma's unsuccessfully attempt to take over her body. They are briefly ambushed by Yuli and Galgano, who turns on Anti-Bazalta to help save his father Barbaro from imprisonment. Galgano is killed by Yuli after he reveals Barbaro committed suicide while imprisoned. Zig continues to operate within Bazalta, raising his rank and covertly helping Anti-Bazalta, hoping to bring Faz over to their side and find out if Missy is alive. Eventually found out, Zig reunites with Anti-Bazalta and they face the Seven Knights' forces; he in turn defeats Sengoku and Rosa, and kills Norma. He then fights Faz, who reveals Yuli is holding Missy hostage as leverage over him. Faz defects, and eventually Zig defeats Yuli and saves Missy.

A new Seven Knights are formed from Harth, Zig, Faz, Tylong, Ren, Igorida, and a repentant Rosa. Missy reveals that her tribe's ritual was designed to predict the Evinos's rampage, which is immanent. Reclaiming a stolen Cantaleran artifact from Zebrilla, they discover that a proclaimed king of Cantalera and the "Last Ranker"—the world's strongest warrior—can open a doorway to the Evinos's domain and end them. The Evinos begin their attack, focusing on the Cantaleran ruins where the doorway is located. The Seven Knights, aided by Makis and Tylong's forces, storm the ruins and open the portal to the Evinos core using Zig and Harth, but Harth insists on fighting Zig to fulfil his longing for combat. Zig wins, taking the role of Last Ranker, and goes through the portal. Zig destroys the Evinos's leader, an entity which has forgotten its original purpose, and escapes to reunite with the others as the Evinos die. The ending shows Zig and Faz mourning their tribe, then an ending narration reveals the new Seven Knights reformed Bazalta into a non-political training institute.

== Development ==
Last Ranker was developed by Imageepoch. The staff included multiple industry veterans. The game was directed by Kazuya Niinou, who had earlier worked at Atlus on Trauma Center: Under the Knife and the original Etrian Odyssey before joining Imageepoch and directing 7th Dragon. Niinou had a great respect for Capcom as love of their projects had encouraged him to enter the gaming industry, particularly Street Fighter II. After Imageepoch entered a production agreement with Capcom, Niinou created the game's design pitch around Capcom's fighting game legacy. The producer was Capcom's Minae Matsukawa, known for her work on the Ace Attorney series, while established Capcom illustrator Tatsuya Yoshikawa created the character designs. Capcom had long been absent from the RPG market, so Matsukawa wanted to create something original. Yoshikawa described his work on the game as less exaggerated than his work on Breath of Fire or Devil May Cry, steering to his preferred style of "muddy" and restrained designs. He described the designs as being inspired by the music and the storyline, and on the requests of senior staff. The Evinos enemies were designed by illustrator Shin Nagasawa, known for his work on monster designs for the Etrian Odyssey series.

Niinou conceived the setting and narrative based on his liking for tournaments between rivals in shōnen manga. The scenario was written by Kazushige Nojima, known for his work on Final Fantasy VII and the Kingdom Hearts series. While there were several tropes associated with RPGs similar to Last Ranker, Nojima's scenario was described as an adult take on a shōnen storyline that would avoid genre tropes. Nojima was sending in scripted scenarios once a week, which he found tiring but excited the rest of the staff. He was also unsure about whether he could write for a Capcom title given their history of "crazy" narratives. He modelled Zig's attitude after his own life as a country person who came to the city, inspired by Niinou's description of the character. The cast included a number of notable voice actors. The cast portrayals in-game were influenced by the actors, several of whom discussed the characters during recording. Zig and Faz were played as opposites; Kamiya voiced Zig to be the most impassioned despite a cool exterior, while Nakamura portrayed Faz in a straightforward manner. The voice recording process was described by game staff as emotional.

The battle system was designed around the title's descriptive slogan "RPG aiming for the strongest". The faster pace of battles compared to Niinou's earlier menu-based projects was chosen due to the game being developed for PlayStation Portable (PSP), which Niinou felt was more suited to an action-based combat design. Despite the focus on action in the narrative and battle system, the battle system remained grounded in turn-based mechanics. Niinou wanted to make the battle system and bosses engaging, but still keep it easy enough that players could see the end without grinding. The Seven Knights went through periods of adjustment so they would be a challenge for players without appearing unfair. Developing the system was a challenge for the team due to the one-on-one nature of many battles and its semi-automated design. At Capcom's insistence, stronger versions of the Seven Knights were included as post-game challenge battles. The constant adjustments due to input from Capcom and feedback during testing were negatively compared to running in a three-legged race.

=== Music ===
Last Ranker Original Soundtrack

Soundtrack album by Yoko Shimomura
- Released: 28 July 2010
- Genre: Video game soundtrack
- Length: 2:09:57
- Label: Suleputer
- Producer: Yoko Shimomura

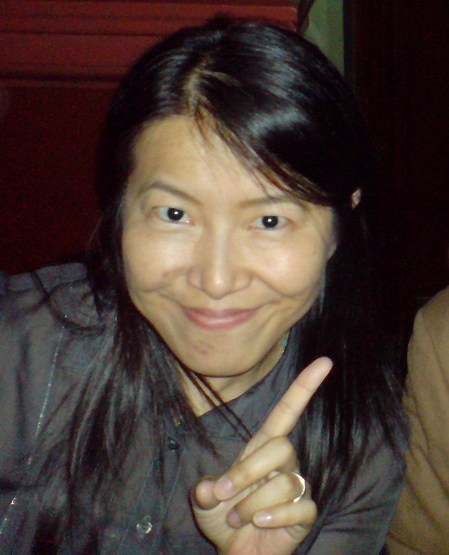
Yoko Shimomura (pictured 2008) composed and produced all music for Last Ranker.

The game's music was composed by Yoko Shimomura, known for her work both at Capcom on titles including Street Fighter II, and later at Square Enix and as a freelancer for her work on Parasite Eve and the Kingdom Hearts series. Shimomura acted as sole composer and producer, while Hironori Osone arranged the music. She first met with Niinou and Matsukawa, and was enthusiastic by the wish for a battle theme featuring vocals. Niinou's original request was for operatic vocals, but eventually he settled for something that sounded "cool". She was overwhelmed with emotion being able to work with Capcom again, and drew from the feeling of returning to an old workplace or elementary school in portraying the emotions of Zig through the music. She described herself as being "infected" with Niinou's enthusiasm for the project. Some of the music discussions with Niinou and Matsukawa lasted up to seven hours, and she remembered one meeting that ended abruptly when she was struck by an idea and left to write it down.

Compared to other projects she worked on, Last Ranker featured a lot of live orchestral recording sessions. Orchestral recording took place through January 2010. The instruments used for the soundtrack included piano, cello, pan pipes, low whistle, and electric and twelve-string guitars. There was also heavy use of drums, noted as a rarity in Capcom soundtracks. Shimomura combined choral and electronic elements for tracks relating to the alien Evinos. The choral work included Latin-style chanting and female Bulgarian folk singing. English vocals were performed by Joelle Strother, with lyrics by Margaret Lucy. The solo soprano sections were performed by Hiroko Hayama, who also wrote the Latin lyrics. The soprano solos were a very late addition to the soundtrack. During the later recording sessions, several fine adjustments were made to balance out the instruments. Work on the soundtrack lasted a year, and included over forty tracks.

The vocal track "Born to Survive" was one of the first tracks to be created, forming the core of the main theme and with lyrics reflecting Zig's goals and passion to become the strongest warrior. She also created an instrumental version of "Born to Survive" titled after one of the song's lyrics "Beyond This World of Woe". The secondary battle theme "Glorious Fights We Call 'Life'" was written as a counterpart to "Born to Survive". "Crudelis et Magnificus", the battle theme for the Seven Knights, was composed as a grand choral work with Latin lyrics setting the combatants and context apart from standard fights. Latin was used again for the track "Fatum Foedus", used for some enemies' special attacks. The theme for Harth's battle, "Be The Last Ranker", combined motifs from all the other battle themes. She gave Yuli a specific character theme called "La Valse Noire", representing his distorted nature; recording was difficult, and the performers required a conductor to get the right tempos. For the theme song, Capcom partnered with rock band Uverworld. When looking for a collaborator, Uverworld was chosen as their style of music fit in with the world design of Last Ranker. Their song, "Ultimate", was an original creation written from Zig's perspective.

A two-CD original soundtrack album was published by Capcom's music label Suleputer and distributed by Sony Music on 28 July 2010. The CD included a twelve-page booklet with commentary from Shimomura on each track and messages from Shimomura and the development staff. A limited edition album of five tracks arranged for piano, violin and cello was released alongside the game. One of the featured performers was violinist Ayako Ishikawa. The arrange album came as an early purchase bonus with all editions of the game. Ishikawa performed several arranged themes from Last Ranker at a violin recital on 17 October at Verbrugghen Hall in Sydney. A track from the game, "The Bloom of Passion", was featured in a 25th anniversary concert of Shimomura's music in February 2014. "Ultimate" was released on the B-side as part of the single CD release for "Qualia". Reception of the soundtrack album was generally positive, with critics citing it as one of Shimomura's best compositions. Reactions to the arranged album was less positive, but still noted its musical quality.

== Release ==
The first hint of the game's existence was given in 2008 by Imageepoch president Ryoei Mikage, who stated that the company was working on an action-based PSP title that would be revealed within the next year or two. It was noted that Imageepoch had previously released most of their work on Nintendo platforms. The game, along with its staff and estimated release window of 2010, was officially announced in September 2009. At the time it was said to be 40% complete. Last Ranker was released on 15 July 2010. It was released as both a standard edition, and a limited Extended Edition which included a booklet of production notes and illustrations. A digital version and a version for the Best Price budget range were released on 14 April 2011. Last Ranker was among several PSP titles included in the Japan-exclusive UMD Passport program, allowing PSP titles to be played on the PlayStation Vita. Two supplementary books were published; the strategy guide Last Ranker: The Complete Guide by ASCII Media Works on 31 August, and Last Ranker Official Setting Documents Collection containing developer interviews and artwork on 10 September.

A possible Western localization was noted after Capcom trademarked the game's title in North America and Europe. Ultimately the title was never released outside Japan. A preview noted that its audience and platform was far more popular in Japan than overseas. Speaking in a 2011 interview Haru Akeanga, president of Imageepoch's then-publishing partner NIS America, noted that PSP titles such as Last Ranker were difficult to market overseas due to lower sales on the platform outside Japan, explaining its lack of localization. A partial fan translation was released in 2016.

=== Related media ===
After he completed the main scenario, Nojima was asked whether he wanted to write a novella based on the narrative. As he had free time, Nojima agreed, and wrote Departure Determination as a prequel leading up to Zig's departure at the game's opening. It was serialized through the game's website in four parts between June and the game's release in July. A second novella written by Nojima, World of the Seven Knights, was released as part of the second guidebook.

The title was also supported by two CD dramas. The first is an adaptation of the prequel novella Departure Determination; in addition to Kamiya, Nakamura and Nazuka reprising their roles from the game, new actors were brought in to voice characters exclusive to the novella. The CD released on 22 September 2010, published by Suleputer and distributed by Sony. A second CD drama based on an original novella by Nojima, Nejineji Bread with Carbonated Water, was released on 15 December, again published by Suleputer and distributed by Sony. The game's cast reprised their roles for the drama.

The game was adapted into a manga, beginning serialization in Kodansha's Monthly Shōnen Rival magazine in September 2010. Titled Last Ranker: Be The Last One, it was written by Satoshi Ueda and illustrated by Fuuki Shikiyagi under Capcom's supervision. The first issue was a 62-page full color spread. The manga finished serialization on 4 October 2011. The manga was collected into three tankōbon and published by Kodansha between February and December 2011. The story covers the game's events from the opening to the final battle with Yuli. A spin-off manga created by Yu Satsuki and supervised by Capcom, Last Ranker: Chain of Blue Silver, was released as a standalone volume on 27 July 2011 by ASCII Media Works. It details Faz's experiences following Zig's departure from the tribe.

== Reception ==
Reception

Review score
| Publication | Score |
|---|---|
| Famitsu | 33/40 |

During its first week of release, Last Ranker entered gaming charts in fifth place, selling over 60,750 units. It continued to sell strongly into the following week with a further 21,000 units, dropping to ninth place. It remained in the top 25 best-selling games during early August. According to estimates from both journalist website Famitsu and data collection company Media Create, the game sold over 100,000 units during 2010.

Its story and characters were positively noted. Famitsu praised the setting and called the characters "unique and charming". In a preview for 1Up.com by Ryan Winterhalter noted that the setting stuck close to genre tropes aimed at teenage Japanese males. Its pacing was a recurring point of concern for journalists.

The gameplay was the main focus of many reviews, and met with praise. Famitsu enjoyed the flow and tempo of combat, but noted some problems with communicating information on character stats and restricting which Rankers could be challenged to combat. Taku Kihara of Japanese website Game Watch Impress praised the battle system as engaging and easy to learn, but found it lacking in difficulty and content. Naohiko Sudare of 4Gamer.net likewise praised the battle system as an unconventional offering compared to other RPGs at the time. Winterhalter noted its similar approach to Final Fantasy XIII with a delivery of new gameplay concepts accompanied by tutorials, noting some players would not have the patience for it.
