= Mother at Fourteen =

2006 Japanese television series

- Poster

Japanese name
- Kanji: 14才の母 〜愛するために 生まれてきた〜
- Literal meaning: 14-year-old Mother: Born for Love's Sake
Transcriptions
- Revised Hepburn: Jūyonsai no Haha: Aisuru Tame ni, Umaretekita
- Genre: Family drama
- Written by: Yumiko Inoue
- Directed by: Toya Sato; Noriyoshi Sakuma; Manami Yamashita
- Starring: Mirai Shida
- Theme music composer: Kazutoshi Sakurai
- Ending theme: "Shirushi"
- Composers: Kan Sawada; Yu Takami
- Country of origin: Japan
- Original language: Japanese
- No. of seasons: 1
- No. of episodes: 11 (list of episodes)

Production
- Producers: Ken Murase; Chizu Asai
- Running time: 54 minutes
- Production companies: NTV; MMJ (cooperation)

Original release
- Network: NTV
- Release: October 11 – December 20, 2006

Mother at Fourteen (14才の母 〜愛するために 生まれてきた〜, Jūyonsai no Haha: Aisuru Tame ni, Umaretekita; lit. "14-year-old Mother: Born for Love's Sake"), or 14-year-old Mother (14才の母, 14-sai no Haha), is a Japanese television drama starring Mirai Shida, produced by Nippon Television (NTV) in cooperation with Media Mix Japan (MMJ) and broadcast on NTV from October 11, 2006, until December 20 of the same year.

== Plot ==
Miki Ichinose is a 14-year-old schoolgirl who is very outgoing and cheerful. She lives with her parents and younger brother. She is in a romantic relationship with Satoshi Kirino, who is 15 years old. They keep their relationship a secret from their parents because Miki is young and Satoshi is expected to excel in school and get into a university so he can take over the family business by his overbearing mother.

One night, after a date, they sneak into a treehouse and consummate their relationship. Soon after, Miki suspects that she is pregnant and steals a pregnancy test, which her mother later finds. She is taken to a doctor who confirms her pregnancy.

Miki's parents are very upset, and the doctor tells them that it will be too dangerous for Miki to carry a baby due to her small size. They arrange for her to have an abortion, but Miki is unsure what she should do.

She and Satoshi meet later that night and she gathers the courage to confess her love to him, and he reciprocates. She then tells him that she is pregnant and, although understandably shocked, he takes the news well. However, his mother is furious when she learns of it and forbids the two from seeing each other. Under pressure from his mother, Satoshi tells Miki that an abortion is best. Devastated, she breaks up with him, saying losing his love hurts the most.

On the day of the abortion, Miki decides she can't go through with it and runs away from the clinic, with her mother chasing after her. Miki breaks down and tells her mother that she wants to keep the baby. Afterwards, seeing Miki's pain and love for her unborn child, her parents want to support her. Satoshi's mother is furious that Miki has chosen to keep the baby and offers money for an abortion, which the Ichinose family refuses.

Although deciding to focus on her pregnancy and how to give birth to a healthy baby, Miki remains grief-stricken over her breakup with Satoshi, who is also struggling to forget about her and their forthcoming child. To make matters worse, the Kirino family business begins to go bankrupt, which forces Satoshi and his mother to leave and go into hiding to avoid the press. Before they leave, Miki and her mother meet with them. Miki tells Satoshi that she plans to raise the baby with her family's help and won't acknowledge his paternity because she wants him to continue going to school and have a successful future. However, this angers him, leading them to be estranged even more.

Miki has to temporarily drop out of school because of her pregnancy and that the teachers believe it will be a bad influence to the other students. A reporter who has been tracking the Kirino family since they went into hiding and suspects that Satoshi is the father of Miki's child, begins to track her. Miki wonders if keeping the baby is the right choice for her due to all the changes that are affecting the lives of her family, friends, and her boyfriend's. Satoshi's mother becomes depressed and attempts suicide to end her misery in debt and humiliation, but he gets her help just in time. Miki's mother visits with them and asks Satoshi to see Miki and the baby one day.

At seven months into the pregnancy, Miki begins to go into premature labor and the reporter, who has been following her, calls for an ambulance. Miki gives birth to a baby girl, that she names Sora, via Caesarean section. Being premature, Sora is placed in the NICU for underdeveloped lungs. Miki's father sees Satoshi on the street and chases after him, and later finds their hiding spot. He pleads for Satoshi to see Miki because she has been longing to see him again and tells him about the baby's condition. Satoshi's mother brushes his pleas off but Satoshi doesn't know what he should do. Miki's father takes him to the hospital to see Sora, and Satoshi is overwhelmed by the sight of his tiny daughter.

He later tells his mother that, despite how much he tries to run away and forget, Sora is still his child. Even without his mother's support, Satoshi visits with Miki the day of her discharge to tell her that he has decided to forgot high school to start working and provide for the baby because he wants to take responsibility and raise her with Miki. The two then go with Miki's mother to see the baby and Satoshi learns that Miki named the baby Sora, after the sky which has been symbolic to them. Miki and Satoshi then tell their parents that they hope to get married when they turn 18. Although Miki's parents accept this, Satoshi's mother reluctantly relents but says she will not visit with the baby.

The drama ends with Miki and her family bringing Sora, now healthy and full-term, home and posing for a family picture. Satoshi begins working to help provide for the baby and his mother begins a new business that seems to help bring her out of her depression. Miki begins her new life as a teenage mother.

== Cast ==
=== Major characters ===
- Mirai Shida as Miki Ichinose (一ノ瀬未希, Ichinose Miki)
- Misako Tanaka as Kanako Ichinose (一ノ瀬加奈子, Ichinose Kanako)
- Katsuhisa Namase as Tadahiko Ichinose (一ノ瀬忠彦, Ichinose Tadahiko)
- Kazuki Koshimizu as Kenta Ichinose (一ノ瀬健太, Ichinose Kenta)
- Sora Ichinose (一ノ瀬そら, Ichinose Sora)
- Sayaka Yamaguchi as Kyōko Endō (遠藤香子, Endō Kyōko)
- Junichi Koumoto as Makoto Mitsui (三井マコト, Mitsui Makoto)
- Sayaka Kaneko as Hinako Mitsui (三井ひな子, Mitsui Hinako)
- Haruma Miura as Satoshi Kirino (桐野智志, Kirino Satoshi)
- Shigeru Muroi as Shizuka Kirino (桐野静香, Kirino Shizuka)
- Mitsuki Tanimura as Mayu Yanagisawa (柳沢真由那, Yanagisawa Mayu)
- Kie Kitano as Megumi Kubota (久保田恵, Kubota Megumi)
- Rina Koike as Sayaka Nagasaki (長崎さやか, Nagasaki Sayaka)
- Yumiko Ideguchi as Yoshiko Okumura (奥村美子, Okumura Yoshiko)
- Kiyo Hasegawa as Mitsue Inohara (猪原光江, Inohara Mitsue)
- Itsumi Osawa as Rika Matsumoto (松本リカ, Matsumoto Rika)
- Ken Kaito as Kōyō Yamazaki (山崎光陽, Yamazaki Kōyō)
- Shunya Isaka as Kazuaki Haraguchi (原口和明, Haraguchi Kazuaki)
- Atsuko Takahata as Haruko Matoba (的場春子, Matoba Haruko)
- Akira Onodera as Eiza Nakatani (中谷栄三, Nakatani Eiza)
- Kazuki Kitamura as Taku Hatano (波多野卓, Hatano Taku)

=== Minor characters ===
- Naho Toda (ep. 8)
- Takashi Sorimachi as Tarō Tsuchida (土田太郎, Tsuchida Tarō) (ep. 10–11)

== Production ==
Upon preparing for this role, actress Mirai Shida asked her real-life mother for advice. She wanted to know if there were changes (in walking, appetite, etc.) during pregnancy. Her mother replied, "Except for the belly becoming bigger, nothing else changes." This did not prepare Shida in any way, as stated by herself.

Originally, there were only 10 episodes - however, due to the success the show achieved, an extra episode was created.

== Music ==
Theme song:

- "Shirushi" by Mr. Children

Soundtrack album:

- Mother at Fourteen O.S.T – TVSANTORA

== Episodes ==
	Episode title	Translation of title	Broadcast date	Ratings (Kantō)	Ratings (Kansai)
Ep. 1	中学生の妊娠…ごめんね、お母さ	The Pregnancy of a Junior High School Student… Sorry, Mom	2006/10/11	19.7%	21.8%
Ep. 2	お前なんかもう娘じゃない	You are Not (Our) Daughter Anymore	2006/10/18	16.8%	18.0%
Ep. 3	さよなら…わたしの赤ちゃん	Goodbye… My Baby	2006/10/25	18.3%	18.1%
Ep. 4	約束…私は、もう泣かない	Promise… I Will Not Cry Anymore	2006/11/1	19.4%	19.8%
Ep. 5	バイバイ…初恋が死んだ日	Bye-bye… The Day When (My) First Love Dies	2006/11/8	17.3%	20.7%
Ep. 6	私にも母子手帳くれますか	Am I Given a Maternity Record Book too?	2006/11/15	16.7%	18.8%
Ep. 7	お金で未来は買えますか?	Can Future Be Bought with Money?	2006/11/22	18.4%	19.0%
Ep. 8	二つの命…どちらを選ぶ?	Two Lives… Which One Will You Choose?	2006/11/29	17.3%	20.5%
Ep. 9	出産・命をかけた24時間	Childbirth: The 24 Hours of Risking One's Own Life	2006/12/6	16.7%	19.2%
Ep. 10	2もう一度笑って…	Laugh Once More…	2006/12/13	21.1%	24.0%
Ep. 11	涙の最終回スペシャル…命ってなに?	The Tearful Last Episode… What Is Life?	2006/12/20	22.4%	24.3%
Average Ratings for Kanto region: 18.55% Average Ratings for Kansai region: 20.38%

The average rating for this drama was the highest rating this slot (Wednesday at 10:00 PM) achieved on NTV since 2000. This record was broken by the television series I'm Mita, Your Housekeeper., which garnered an average rating of 25.2%.
