= Lost ID =

Japanese television series

Lost ID (そして、誰もいなくなった, Soshite, Dare mo Inaku Natta; "And, There Were None") is a J-drama Japanese television series starring Tatsuya Fujiwara as Shin'ichi Todo (藤堂 新一, Tōdō Shin'ichi). The main character's identity cards are stolen and he loses his property. He has to find who is responsible and a way to get his life back. Fujiawara stated that "I really think the characters are brilliantly written and portrayed because the viewers won’t be able to easily see their true colors and guess who’s actually evil."

As of 2016 Lost ID airs in Singapore on Gem TV.
