= The One (Uverworld album) =

THE ONE

Studio album by Uverworld
- Released: November 28, 2012 (Japan)
- Recorded: 2011–2012
- Genre: Rock
- Label: gr8! records
- Producers: UVERworld; Satoru Hiraide

Uverworld chronology
Life 6 Sense (2011)	THE ONE (2012)	Ø Choir (2014)

Singles from The One
- 1. "Baby Born & Go/Kinjito" Released: December 14, 2011; 2. "7th Trigger" Released: March 28, 2012; 3. "The Over" Released: August 29, 2012; 4. "Reversi" Released: December 26, 2012

The One is Uverworld's seventh original album, which contains 13 tracks. It was released on November 28, 2012. The members came up with the title because they feel that "our fans and people become "one", and as a team, each and every person's unique personalities become interwoven." They also stated that "after being active for 12 years, we've finally arrived at stage 1." The album will contain "Reversi", which will serve as the theme song for the upcoming Ao no Exorcist movie (December 28 release) as well as "The Over", which was used as the theme song for the drama series Kuro no Onna Kyoshi.

The DVD for the limited edition will come with footage from Live at Avaco Studio and music videos. It will also enclose a 24-page special booklet.

The album reached #4 rank weekly and charted for 16 weeks.

== Track listing ==
All tracks arranged by UVERworld and Satoru Hiraide.

All lyrics are written by TAKUYA∞.

No.	Title	Music	Length
1.	"THE ONE (SE)"	Akira	0:42
2.	"7th Trigger"	TAKUYA∞	4:19
3.	"Don't Think.Feel"	UVERworld	3:46
4.	"LIMITLESS"	UVERworld	4:18
5.	"23 word (23ワード)"	TAKUYA∞; Akira	4:43
6.	"KINJITO (LIVE intro ver.)"	UVERworld	5:09
7.	"THE OVER"	UVERworld	5:22
8.	"Koko kara (此処から)"	UVERworld	3:59
9.	"REVERSI"	TAKUYA∞; Akira	4:50
10.	"Barbell〜kōtei no atarashī fuku (バーベル～皇帝の新しい服album ver.～)"	TAKUYA∞	3:20
11.	"BABY BORN & GO"	TAKUYA∞	4:28
12.	"AWAYOKUBA-Kiru (LIVE intro ver.) (AWAYOKUBA-斬る (LIVE intro ver.))"	TAKUYA∞; Akira	7:38
13.	"NOWHERE boy"	TAKUYA∞	5:41

Limited edition DVD
No.	Title	Length
1.	"CORE PRIDE" (LIVE at Avaco Studio)
2.	"Itsuka kanarazu shinu koto wo wasureru na (いつか必ず死ぬことを忘れるな)" (LIVE at Avaco Studio)
3.	"NO.1～ace of ace" (LIVE at Avaco Studio)
4.	"Isseki wo Toujiru Tokyo midnight sun (一石を投じる Tokyo midnight sun)" (LIVE at Avaco Studio)
5.	"KINJITO" (Music Video)
6.	"BABY BORN & GO" (Music Video)
7.	"7th Trigger" (Music Video)
8.	"AWAYOKUBA-Kiru (AWAYOKUBA-斬る)" (Music Video)
9.	"THE OVER" (Music Video)
10.	"THE SONG" (Music Video)
11.	"UVERworld×デジタルハリウッドSPOT1" (TV Spot)
12.	"UVERworld×デジタルハリウッドSPOT2" (TV Spot)
13.	"UVERworld×デジタルハリウッドSPOT3" (TV Spot)
