= Parade (2009 film) =

- Film poster
- Directed by: Isao Yukisada
- Screenplay by: Isao Yukisada
- Based on: Parēdo by Shuichi Yoshida
- Produced by: Ryuta Inoue; Mamoru Inoue; Tetsu Kuchigouchi; Atsushi Sugai
- Starring: Tatsuya Fujiwara; Karina Nose; Shihori Kanjiya
- Cinematography: Jun Fukumoto
- Edited by: Tsuyoshi Imai
- Music by: Hirofumi Asamoto
- Production companies: Showgate; Monster Ultra; Horipro; Wowow
- Release dates: 12 October 2009 (BIFF); 20 February 2010 (Japan)
- Running time: 118 minutes
- Country: Japan
- Language: Japanese

Parade (Japanese: パレード, Hepburn: Parēdo) is a 2009 Japanese drama film directed by Isao Yukisada. It is based on the novel of the same name by Shuichi Yoshida.

== Cast ==
- Tatsuya Fujiwara as Naoki Ihara
- Karina Nose as Mirai Soma
- Shihori Kanjiya as Kotomi Okochi
- Win Morisaki as Makoto
- Kento Hayashi as Satoru Kokubo
- Keisuke Koide as Ryosuke Sugimoto
