= Endscape =

Single by Uverworld
- Released: May 30, 2007
- Genre: Rock
- Length: 13:15
- Label: gr8! records
- Composer(s): Uverworld
- Lyricist(s): Takuya∞
- Producer(s): Uverworld; Satoru Hiraide

Uverworld singles chronology
"Kimi no Suki na Uta" (2006)	"Endscape" (2007)	"Shaka Beach: Laka Laka La" (2007)

CD/DVD Cover

“Endscape” is the seventh single by Japanese rock band Uverworld, released on May 30, 2007, under Gr8! Records. The single was issued in two formats: a standard CD edition and a limited CD+DVD edition. The title track was used as the first opening theme for the anime television series Toward the Terra.

== Background and release ==
"Endscape" continued Uverworld's integration of hard rock and electronic elements. The band contributed both music and production to the single, with lyrical content written by lead vocalist Takuya∞. The CD/DVD version included a music video for the title track.

== Track listing ==
All lyrics written by Takuya∞. All tracks arranged by Uverworld.

CD single
No.	Title	Length	Length
1.	"Endscape"	4:36
2.	"Unknown Orchestra"	4:29
3.	"Monochrome: Kizuke Nakatta Devotion (モノクローム～気付けなかったDevotion～)"	4:10
Total length:			13:15

== Commercial performance ==
"Endscape" debuted at number 4 on the Oricon Weekly Singles Chart, selling over 60,000 copies in its first week. It remained on the chart for three consecutive weeks.

=== Oricon sales chart (Japan) ===
Release date	Chart	Peak position	Sales	Weeks charted
May 30, 2007	Oricon Daily Singles Chart	3	–	–
May 30, 2007	Oricon Weekly Singles Chart	4	60,921	3
May 2007	Oricon Monthly Singles Chart	10	–	–

== Music video ==
The music video for "Endscape" features the band performing in an abstract industrial landscape. It was directed by Masaki Ohkita and released as part of the CD+DVD limited edition.

== In popular culture ==
- The title track served as the first opening theme song for the anime Toward the Terra (Terra e...).
