= Eiga ST Aka to Shirō no Sōsa File =

- Poster
- Directed by: Tōya Satō
- Screenplay by: Yūsuke Watanabe
- Based on: ST Aka to Shirō no Sōsa File
- Produced by: Yoshio Nakayama; Hiroyuki Fukuda; Yoshitaka Hori; Minami Ichikawa; Yoshirō Hosono
- Starring: Tatsuya Fujiwara; Masaki Okada; Mirai Shida
- Cinematography: Takashi Obara
- Edited by: Toshirō Matsutake
- Music by: Hideakira Kimura
- Distributed by: Toho
- Release date: January 10, 2015
- Running time: 110 minutes
- Country: Japan
- Language: Japanese
- Box office: US$2 million

Eiga ST Aka to Shirō no Sōsa File (映画 ＳＴ赤と白の捜査ファイル) is a 2015 Japanese suspense mystery police drama film directed by Tōya Satō. The film is a spinoff of the television series ST Aka to Shirō no Sōsa File. It was released on January 10, 2015.

== Cast ==
- Tatsuya Fujiwara as Samon Akagi
- Masaki Okada as Tomohisa Yurine
- Mirai Shida as Shō Aoyama
- Sei Ashina as Midori Yūki
- Masataka Kubota as Yūji Kurosaki
- Hiroki Miyake as Saizō Yamabuki
- Tetsushi Tanaka as Gorō Kikukawa
- Yuki Shibamoto as Momoko Tsutsui
- Kensei Mikami as Shinji Makimura
- Kento Hayashi as Sōsuke Ikeda
- Asaka Seto as Shiori Matsudo
- Atsuro Watabe as Toshirō Saegusa
- Yumi Adachi as Naomi Dōjima

== Reception ==
The film has earned US$2 million at the Japanese box office.
