= ST Aka to Shirō no Sōsa File =

- Genre: Suspense, mystery
- Written by: Yūsuke Watanabe
- Starring: Tatsuya Fujiwara; Masaki Okada; Mirai Shida
- Ending theme: Taiyō by Funky Kato
- Country of origin: Japan
- Original language: Japanese
- No. of episodes: 10

Production
- Producers: Masahiro Mori; Hibiki Satō
- Production company: Nippon Television

Original release
- Network: NNNS (Nippon TV)
- Release: July 16 – September 17, 2014

ST Aka to Shirō no Sōsa File (ＳＴ 赤と白の捜査ファイル) is a Japanese suspense mystery television series. It was broadcast on Nippon Television and other NNS stations from July 16 to September 17, 2014, with a total of 10 episodes. A spinoff film, Eiga ST Aka to Shirō no Sōsa File, was released on January 10, 2015.

== Cast ==
- Tatsuya Fujiwara as Samon Akagi
- Masaki Okada as Tomohisa Yurine
- Mirai Shida as Shō Aoyama
- Sei Ashina as Midori Yūki
- Masataka Kubota as Yūji Kurosaki
- Hiroki Miyake as Saizō Yamabuki
- Yuki Shibamoto as Momoko Tsutsui
- Kensei Mikami as Shinji Makimura
- Tetsushi Tanaka as Gorō Kikukawa
- Kento Hayashi as Sōsuke Ikeda
- Asaka Seto as Shiori Matsudo
- Atsuro Watabe as Toshirō Saegusa

Preceded by Hanasaki Mai ga Damatte Inai (16/04/2014 - 18/06/2014)	NTV Tears Wednesday 水曜ドラマ; Wednesdays 22:00 - 23:00 (JST)	Succeeded by Kyō wa Kaisha Yasumimasu (15/10/2014 - 17/12/2014)
