= Proglution =

Studio album by Uverworld
- Released: January 16, 2008
- Recorded: 2007
- Genre: Alternative rock, pop rock
- Label: gr8! records
- Producer: Uverworld; Satoru Hiraide

Uverworld chronology
Bugright (2007)	Proglution (2008)	AwakEVE (2009)

Alternative Cover
- CD+DVD Cover

Singles from Proglution
- 1. "endscape" Released: May 30, 2007; 2. "Shaka Beach 〜Laka Laka La〜 (シャカビーチ〜Laka Laka La〜)" Released: August 8, 2007; 3. "Ukiyo Crossing (浮世Crossing)" Released: November 14, 2007

Professional ratings
Review scores
Source	Rating
Allmusic	3.5/5 stars

Proglution is the 3rd full album released by Japanese rock band Uverworld as well as being the follow-up to their second album, Bugright. The album was released January 16, 2008. The limited pressing of the album was also released on the same day which contained a DVD with 4 music videos of Zero no Kotae (ゼロの答, The Answer of Zero), endscape, Shaka Bīchi ~Laka Laka La~ (シャカビーチ〜Laka Laka La〜, Shaka Beach: Laka Laka La) and Ukiyo Crossing (浮世CROSSING) as well as a video of the filming process for their 4 music videos.

The album entered the Oricon charts 15 times and its peak ranking was at 3rd. The album was certified gold by the Recording Industry Association of Japan. At the same time of their album's certification, their single, Ukiyo Crossing was also certified gold.

The title of their album is a combination of the words "progenitor" and "revolution".

== Track listing ==
CD SRCL-6695/SRCL-6693/4 (limited pressing)
No.	Title	Lyrics	Music	Length
1.	"Roots"	Takuya∞	Takuya∞, Akira	4:31
2.	"brand new ancient"	Takuya∞	Takuya∞, Akira	3:30
3.	"Ukiyo Crossing (浮世Crossing)" (Theme song for Fuji TV's drama series, Hataraki Man.)	Takuya∞	Takuya∞, Akira	4:28
4.	"Byōteki Kikyū Nikki (病的希求日記)"	Takuya∞	Takuya∞	4:00
5.	"counting song-H"	Takuya∞	Takuya∞	4:10
6.	"Shaka Beach ~Laka Laka La~ (シャカビーチ〜Laka Laka La〜 (album ver.)"	Takuya∞	Uverworld	3:55
7.	"GROOVY GROOVY GROOVY"	Takuya∞	Takuya∞, Akira	3:24
8.	"expod-digital"	Takuya∞	Uverworld	3:22
9.	"-Myōsaku Gōgai ORCHESTRA- (-妙策号外ORCHESTRA-)"		Takuya∞	0:54
10.	"UNKNOWN ORCHESTRA (album ver.)"	Takuya∞	Takuya∞	5:21
11.	"-god's followers-"	Takuya∞	Takuya∞	1:03
12.	"Kami Atsume (神集め)"	Takuya∞	Takuya∞	5:02
13.	"-forecast map 1955-"	Takuya∞	Takuya∞	1:23
14.	"ENERGY (album ver.)"	Takuya∞	Takuya∞	4:47
15.	"endscape (album ver.)"	Takuya∞	Uverworld	4:25
16.	"Kokoro ga Sasu Basho to Kuchiguse Soshite Kimi ga Tsuite Kuru (心が指す場所と口癖 そして君がついて来る)"	Takuya∞	Uverworld	4:59
17.	"Oto no Ha (オトノハ)"	Takuya∞	Takuya∞	3:05
18.	"to the world (SE)"	Takuya∞	Takuya∞	1:46

Limited Edition DVD
No.	Title	Length
1.	"Zero no Kotae (ゼロの答, The Answer of Zero)" (Music video)
2.	"Endscape" (Music video)
3.	"Shaka Beach ~Laka Laka La~ (シャカビーチ〜Laka Laka La〜 (album ver.)" (Music video)
4.	"Ukiyo CROSSING (浮世CROSSING)" (Music video)
5.	"Backstage of Music Clips '07" (A documentary featuring the process of filming the music videos.)
