= Shōkōjo Seira =

Japanese drama television series

- Poster
- Also known as: A Little Princess
- Based on: A Little Princess by Frances Hodgson Burnett
- Written by: Yoshikazu Okada
- Directed by: Fuminori Kaneko; Akio Yoshida
- Starring: Mirai Shida
- Theme music composer: Takatsugu Muramatsu
- Ending theme: Kanashimi wa Kitto by UVERworld
- Country of origin: Japan
- Original language: Japanese
- No. of seasons: 1
- No. of episodes: 10

Production
- Producer: Aki Isoyama
- Production locations: India, Japan
- Running time: 54 minutes

Original release
- Network: TBS
- Release: October 17 – December 19, 2009

Shōkōjo Seira (小公女セイラ) is a 2009 Japanese drama television series based on the 1905 children's novel A Little Princess by Frances Hodgson Burnett. Mirai Shida stars as Seira, the daughter of a rich boss of a mining company. Due to her father's sudden death in a mining accident, Seira has overcomes many ordeals at the Millenius Seminary boarding school because she is unable to pay her school fees.

Shōkōjo Seira aired on Saturdays from 7:56pm on the Tokyo Broadcasting System between 17 October and 19 December 2009.

== Plot ==
The beautiful Seira was raised in India, but she is sent back to Japan to continue her education at an affluent boarding high school her mother went to. Although she has lived in luxury, the well-bred Seira is kind and generous, earning her many friends at the school. One person who dislikes Seira is the school's director, though she treats Seira well due to the father's fortune. Then, during Seira's 16th birthday party, the director informs her that her father has died, leaving her penniless. As a result, she is forced to work as a servant in order to pay off her school bills.

It was found out in the latter stages that the director despised Seira's mother, thus expressing her revenge. In the end it was found out that his father's assets were unfrozen, and she became very rich once again. Since Millenius school was on the verge of bankruptcy, Seira saved it by becoming the sole proprietor, but as a condition she would be readmitted back to school. Thus the competition between Kuroda Seira, Takeda Maria and Mizushima Kaori to become the school captain emerged for good.

== Cast ==
- Mirai Shida as Kuroda Seira
- Kento Hayashi as Kaito Miura
- Seiichi Tanabe as Yukio Aran
- Anri Okamoto as Masami Shoji
- Shiori Kutsuna as Kaori Mizushima
- Jun Kaname as Yoshito Kurisu
- Fujiko Kojima as Maria Takeda
- Tsugumi Shinohara as Hinako Kawahara
- Sara Takatsuki as Makoto Asahina
- Hikari Kikuzato as Naomi Shimizu
- Mami Asaoka as Kyoko Honjo
- Natsuko Aso as Mamiko Yoko
- Mizuki Sashide as Rion Jingu
- Rima Nishizaki
- Kayano Masuyama
- Atsushi Yanaka as Ryunosuke Kuroda
- Shinya Owada as Seiichiro Onuma
- Tomoka Kurokawa as Kaoruko Kuroda
- Yuriko Hirooka as Hideko Onuma
- Yuki Saito as Emiko Mimura
- Kanako Higuchi as Chieko Mimura

== Episodes ==
#	Episode title	Romanized title	Translation of title	Broadcast date	Ratings
1	みんなが涙した世界の名作! 超お嬢様が召使いに… 泣いたりしない。だって女の子は誰でもプリンセスなんだから… どんな逆境にも強く正しい姿に家族皆で感動して下さい	Min'na ga namida shita sekai no meisaku! Chō ojōsama ga meshitsukai ni… Nai tari shinai. Datte on'nanoko wa dare demo purinsesuna ndakara… Don'na gyakkyō ni mo tsuyoku tadashī sugata ni kazoku mina de kandō shite kudasai	The world-famous story that touched everyone! The super princess becomes a servant... Don't cry anymore. Any girl can become a princess The strong will in front of adversity impresses a family	October 17, 2009	7.4%
2	学院一自慢の生徒は使用人	Gakuin ichi jiman no seito wa shiyōnin	The school boasts of one student-servant	October 24, 2009	8.0%
3	お姫様の友達はネズミだけ	Ohimesama no tomodachi wa nezumi dakee	Rats are the only friends of the princess	October 31, 2009	7.8%
4	主演女優は私よ!	Shuen joyū wa watashi yo!	I am the main starring actress!	November 7, 2009	7.6%
5	二人だけの修学旅行の夜	Futaridake no shūgakuryokō no yoru	The night of the graduation trip; just the two of them	November 14, 2009	6.0%
6	小悪魔系天使あらわる!	Shōakuma kei tenshi ara waru!	The little devil turns into a little angel!	November 21, 2009	8.4%
7	誰も盗めない宝物	Dare mo nusumenai takaramono	Who stole my treasure	November 28, 2009	8.4%
8	魔法のようなプレゼント	Mahō no yōna purezento	A magical gift	December 5, 2009	7.0%
9	彼女を救うのはだれだ?	Kanojo o sukuu no wa dareda?	'Who is able to rescue that girl?	December 12, 2009	9.8%
10	奇跡の大逆転! 美しき復讐が始まる	Kiseki no dai gyakuten! Utsukushiki fukushū ga hajimaru	A miraculous reversal of fortunes! The start of a beautiful revenge	December 14, 2009	10.9%
Ratings for Kanto region (average rating: 8.13%)

Preceded by Kochikame (1/8/2009 - 26/9/2009)	TBS Saturday 8pm Television Drama Series 土曜8時枠の連続ドラマ; Saturdays 19:56 - 20:54 (JST)	Succeeded by Bloody Monday (Season 2) (23/1/2010 - 20/3/2010)
