= Timeless (Uverworld album) =

Studio album by Uverworld
- Released: February 15, 2006 (Japan)
- Recorded: 2005–2006
- Genre: Alternative rock, industrial rock
- Length: 53:38
- Label: gr8! records
- Producer: Uverworld; Chieko Nakayama

Uverworld chronology
| Timeless (2006) | BUGRIGHT (2007) |

Singles from Timeless
- 1. "D-tecnoLife" Released: July 6, 2005; 2. "CHANCE!" Released: October 26, 2005; 3. "just Melody" Released: January 25, 2006

Professional ratings
Review scores
| Source | Rating |
|---|---|
| Dano Music | 4.5/5 stars |

Timeless is the first full album by Japanese rock band Uverworld. The album was released on February 15, 2006. The album entered the Oricon charts 33 times and it was ranked 5th at its peak. The album was certified gold by the Recording Industry Association of Japan.

On November 22, 2006, another edition of the album titled as Timeless (Special Edition) was released. This edition was only sold from November 22, 2006, to December 29, 2006. This edition includes a DVD containing three music videos and a thirty-minute interview with the band as well as the tracks from the original release. This edition's peak ranking was at 32nd and entered the Oricon album charts 8 times. The album cover and single covers feature UVER CHAN, a character created by Uglydoll co-creator, David Horvath. Horvath illustrated all of the covers and the inner imagery for the limited release of Timeless.

The single D-tecnoLife was used as second opening of anime series Bleach, and it was aired on TV Tokyo from July 6, 2005, to October 23, 2005. D-tecnoLife was also used on video games titles Bleach: Erabarashi Tamashii for PlayStation 2, GameCube and both Wii games, Bleach: GC Tasogare ni Mamieru Shinigami, Bleach: Shattered Blade and Bleach: Versus Crusade.

== Track listing ==
CD SRCL-6240/SRCL-6444/5 (Special Edition)
| No. | Title | Lyrics | Music | Length |
|---|---|---|---|---|
| 1. | "CHANCE!" (Bleach: Heat the Soul 2 theme song) | Takuya∞ | Takuya∞ | 4:30 |
| 2. | "Toki no Namida (トキノナミダ)" | Takuya∞ | Katsuya | 3:44 |
| 3. | "Rush" | Takuya∞ | Takuya∞ | 3:24 |
| 4. | "D-tecnoLife" (Bleach opening theme) | Takuya∞ | Takuya∞ | 3:48 |
| 5. | "Yasashisa no Shizuku (優しさの雫)" (Featured former member of Sound Goku Road saxophonist, Seika.) | Takuya∞ | Takuya∞, Akira | 5:04 |
| 6. | "ai ta Kokoro (ai ta心)" | Takuya∞ | Takuya∞ | 3:16 |
| 7. | "Burst" | Takuya∞ | Takuya∞ | 2:54 |
| 8. | "Nitro" | Takuya∞ | Takuya∞, Akira | 3:34 |
| 9. | "just Melody" (The band's 3rd single.) | Takuya∞ | Takuya∞, Akira | 5:04 |
| 10. | "Lump of Affection" | Takuya∞ | Takuya∞ | 4:25 |
| 11. | "Tobira (扉)" | Takuya∞ | Takuya∞ | 5:29 |
| 12. | "SE" | | Uverworld | 3:10 |
| 13. | "D-tecnoLife (Album Version)" | Takuya∞ | Takuya∞ | 4:33 |

DVD
| No. | Title | Length |
|---|---|---|
| 1. | "D-tecnoLife" (Music video) |
| 2. | "CHANCE!" (Music video) |
| 3. | "just Melody" (Music video) |
| 4. | "Welcome to Uverworld (complete)" (The complete version of the DVD track that was compiled from the band's 3rd single, Just Melody. This includes an interview with the band about their album, Timeless. The secret live that was collected into the 3rd single's DVD was not compiled to the album's DVD.) |
