= Neo Sound Best =

Neo SOUND BEST

Compilation album by Uverworld
- Released: December 9, 2009
- Recorded: 2005–2009
- Genre: Rock, alternative rock, pop rock
- Length: 74 minutes
- Label: gr8! records
- Producer: Uverworld

Uverworld chronology
AwakEVE (2009)	Neo SOUND BEST (2009)	Last (2010)

Neo Sound Best (stylized as Neo SOUND BEST) is the first compilation album from the Japanese rock band UVERworld released on 9 December 2009 under gr8! records label. The album was released to celebrate 5th anniversary of their debut. The album consists of all released singles and selected tracks from studio albums, all tracks went through remastering. The first press version includes DVD disc with live performances.

It reached #2 rank daily and #3 weekly. Totally charted 30 weeks. It has also received platinum certification.

== Track listing ==
No.	Title	Lyrics	Music	Length
1.	"D-tecnoRize"	Takuya∞	Takuya∞	4:59
2.	"Chance!"	Takuya∞	Takuya∞	4:33
3.	"Hakanaku mo Towa no Kanashi (儚くも永久のカナシ)"	Takuya∞	Katsuya, Takuya∞	4:12
4.	"Roots"	Takuya∞	Takuya∞, Akira	4:50
5.	"Gekidou (激動)"	Takuya∞	Takuya∞	5:34
6.	"99/100 Damashi no Tetsu (99/100騙しの哲)"	Takuya∞	Takuya∞	5:02
7.	"Zero no Kotae (ゼロの答)"	Takuya∞	Akira	4:16
8.	"Shaka Beach ~Laka Laka La~ (シャカビーチ〜Laka Laka La〜)"	Takuya∞	UVERworld	3:56
9.	"Ukiyo Crossing (浮世 Crossing)"	Takuya∞	Takuya∞, Akira	4:32
10.	"Shamrock"	Takuya∞	Takuya∞	4:11
11.	"Yasashisa no Shizuku (優しさの雫)"	Takuya∞, Alice ice	Takuya∞, Alice ice	5:04
12.	"Monochrome ~Kitsukenakatta Devotion~ (モノクローム〜気付けなかったdevotion〜)"	Takuya∞	Takuya∞	4:20
13.	"Kimi no Suki na Uta (君の好きなうた)"	Takuya∞, Alice ice	Takuya∞, Akira	4:19
14.	"Koishikute (恋いしくて)"	Takuya∞	Takuya∞, Katsuya	5:18
15.	"Kanashimi wa Kitto (哀しみはきっと)"	Takuya∞	Takuya∞	5:18
16.	"D-tecnoLife"	Takuya∞	Takuya∞	3:53
