= Ø Choir =

Studio album by Uverworld
- Released: July 2, 2014 (Japan)
- Recorded: 2013–2014
- Genre: Rock
- Label: gr8! records
- Producer: Uverworld

Uverworld chronology
The One (2012)	Ø Choir (2014)

Singles from Ø Choir
- 1. "Fight for Liberty/Wizard Club" Released: August 14, 2013; 2. "Nano-Second (ナノ・セカンド)" Released: December 18, 2013; 3. "Nanokame no ketsui (7日目の決意)" Released: June 18, 2014

Ø Choir (stylized as Ø CHOIR) is Uverworld's eight studio album. It was released on July 2, 2014 and there are a total of 14 tracks on the album. This is the first album that will include their sixth member Seika, who was before a support member for UVERworld over these years. Seika saxophone plays was also featured for some of the remakes of their album songs.

The album will contain "Fight For Liberty" which was used as the opening theme song for the anime series Space Battleship Yamato 2199 and "Wizard CLUB" used as the ending theme song for the TV series Kaikin! Bakuro Night. Plus with the other additional singles released in 2014 "Nano-Second (ナノ・セカンド)" and "Nanokame no Ketsui (7日目の決意)" will also be added to the album. For the first time in their history that the band has decided to add a cover song to the album "Born Slippy" from Underworld.

The limited edition will come with the full 120-minute video footage "core ability 3" and 18 commercials of "John & Bob spot patterns". The album will also enclose a 24-page special booklet.

== Track listing ==
CD SRCL-8552~SRCL-8553 (Limited pressing)
No.	Title	Music	Length
1.	"零HERE ～SE～"	UVERworld	1:00
2.	"IMPACT"	UVERworld	4:24
3.	"誰が言った"	UVERworld	4:44
4.	"Nano-Second (ナノ・セカンド album ver.)"	UVERworld	4:54
5.	"Fight for Liberty (album ver.)"	UVERworld	4:15
6.	"ENOUGH-1"	UVERworld	4:41
7.	"KICK ga Jiyuu (KICKが自由)"	UVERworld	4:16
8.	"a LOVELY TONE (album ver.)"	UVERworld	5:12
9.	"Nanokame no Ketsui (7日目の決意)"	UVERworld	6:46
10.	"Betsusekai (別世界)"	UVERworld	3:07
11.	"Born Slippy (Underworld)"		4:30
12.	"Wizard CLUB"	UVERworld	4:10
13.	"Arubeki Katachi (在るべき形)"	UVERworld	4:12
14.	"Ø CHOIR"	UVERworld	5:40

Limited edition DVD
No.	Title	Length
1.	"core ability 3" (LIVE video documentary)
2.	"John & Bob spot 18 pattern" (UVERworld's SonyMusic commercials)
