= Bugright =

Studio album by Uverworld
- Released: February 21, 2007 (Japan)
- Recorded: 2006–2007
- Genres: Alternative rock, rap rock
- Label: gr8! records
- Producers: Uverworld; Chieko Nakayama

Uverworld chronology
| Timeless (2006) | Bugright (2007) | Proglution (2008) |

Singles from Bugright
- 1. "Colors of the Heart" Released: May 17, 2006; 2. "Shamrock" Released: August 2, 2006; 3. "Kimi no Suki na Uta (君の好きなうた)" Released: November 15, 2006

Professional ratings
Review scores
| Source | Rating |
|---|---|
| Dano Music | 3.5/5 stars |

Bugright (stylized as BUGRIGHT) is the 2nd full album by Japanese rock band, Uverworld. The album was released on February 21, 2007. A limited pressing of the album was released on the same day as the normal pressing. The limited pressing features a different cover and includes a special 3-piece casing, a DVD that contains the music videos of "Colors of the Heart", "Shamrock", "Kimi no Suki na Uta" and a documentary featuring the process of recording the album.

The album entered the Oricon charts 38 times and it is ranked 2nd at its peak. The album was certified gold by the Recording Industry Association of Japan.

The album's name is a blend of the English words, bug meaning wrong or defect and right meaning correct and justice.

== Release ==
The song "Shamrock" was released on August 2, 2006. The limited pressing of the single has a DVD containing the video digest of their live performance from their Timeless Tour @ Shibuya-AX. It reached number six on the Oricon charts and sold approximately 97,091 copies. It was used as the drama Dance Drill's theme song. The full version of the ringtone has reached platinum status in February 2010 since its download started on August 2, 2006.

== Track listing ==
CD SRCL-6464/SRCL-6462/3 (limited pressing)
| No. | Title | Lyrics | Music | Length |
|---|---|---|---|---|
| 1. | "Zero no Kotae (ゼロの答)" (Image song for the commercial of Koei's PlayStation 2 game, Warriors Orochi.) | Takuya∞ | Akira | 4:07 |
| 2. | "Shamrock" (Theme song for Fuji TV's drama series, Dandori: Dance Drill as well as commercial song for music.jp.) | Takuya∞ | Takuya∞ | 4:08 |
| 3. | "Home Binetsu 39°C (Home 微熱39°C)" | Takuya∞, Alice ice | Uverworld | 4:38 |
| 4. | "~Nagare・Kūkyo・This Word~ (～流れ・空虚・This Word～)" (A tribute song for Death Note) | Takuya∞ | Takuya∞ | 4:40 |
| 5. | "Colors of the Heart" (3rd opening theme for Blood+.) | Takuya∞, Alice ice | Takuya∞, Akira | 3:52 |
| 6. | "Live everyday as if it were the last day" | Takuya∞ | Takuya∞ | 3:23 |
| 7. | "Sharuman no Ura (シャルマンノウラ)" | Takuya∞ | Takuya∞ | 4:24 |
| 8. | "Hitori Janai Kara (一人じゃないから)" | Takuya∞ | Takuya∞ | 4:08 |
| 9. | "Kimi no Suki na Uta (君の好きなうた)" (Theme song for Tokyo Broadcasting System's drama series Koisuru Hanikami! during the broadcast period of October till December.) | Takuya∞, Alice ice | Takuya∞, Akira | 4:17 |
| 10. | "51%" | Takuya∞ | Takuya∞ | 3:42 |
| 11. | "LIFEsize" | Takuya∞ | Takuya∞, Akira | 4:13 |
| 12. | "Empty96" | Takuya∞ | Takuya∞ | 3:33 |
| 13. | "Discord" | Takuya∞ | Takuya∞ | 4:23 |
| 14. | "Kimi no Suki na Uta (acoustic version) (君の好きなうた)" (Not listed in the track list of the album, this song is a hidden track.) | Takuya∞ | Takuya∞ | 5:02 |

DVD
| No. | Title | Length |
|---|---|---|
| 1. | "Colors of the Heart" (music video) |
| 2. | "Shamrock" (music video) |
| 3. | "Kimi no Suki na Uta (君の好きなうた; The Song You Love)" (Music video) |
| 4. | "The Road to Bugright: documentary film" (A documentary featuring the process of recording this album.) |
