= Mirai Shida =

Japanese actress (born 1993)

- 志田 未来
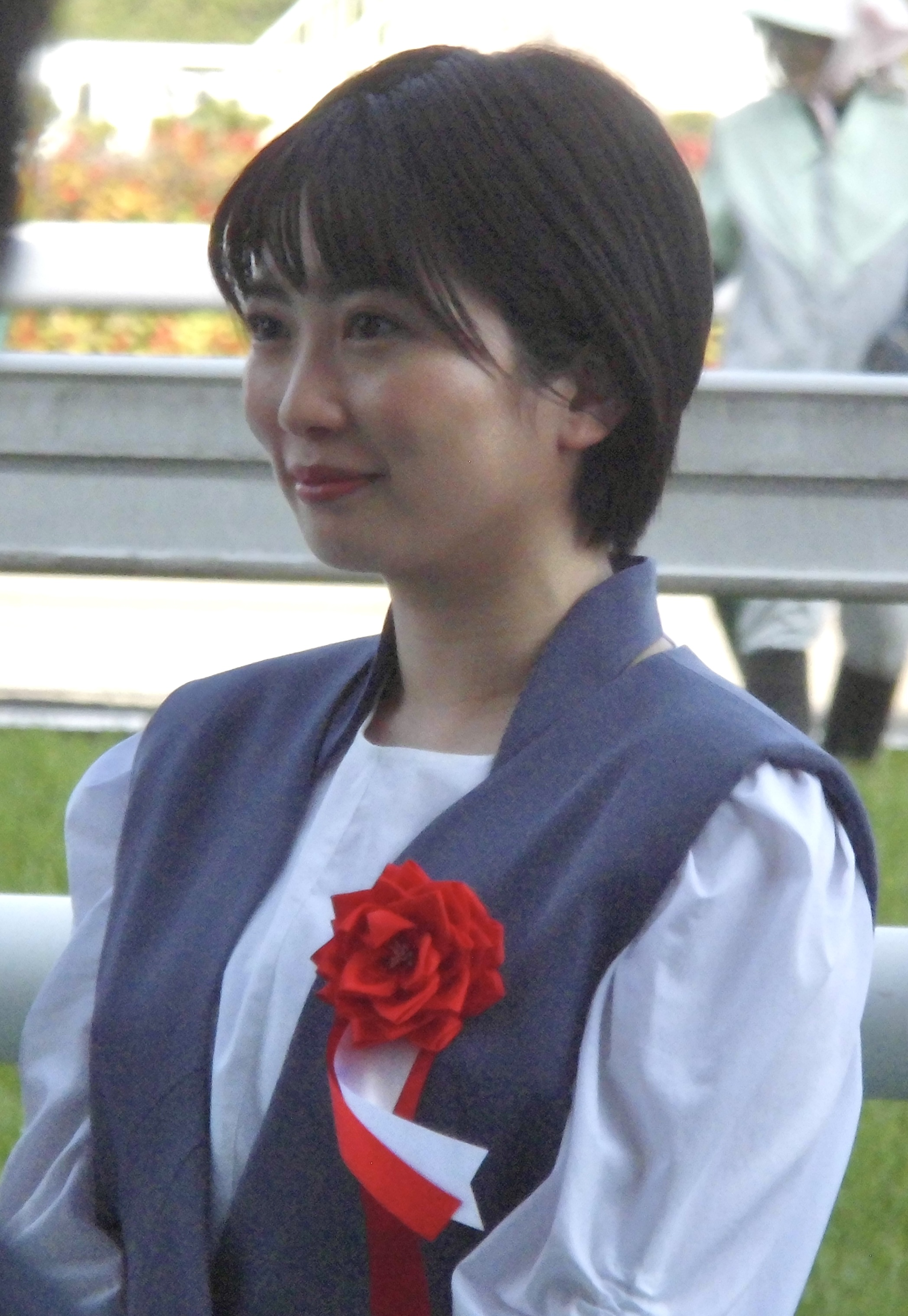
- Mirai Shida in 2024
- Born: May 10, 1993 (age 33); Ayase, Kanagawa, Japan
- Occupation: Actress
- Years active: 1999–present
- Agent: Ken-On
- Known for: The Queen's Classroom and 14-year-old Mother
- Website: http://www.ken-on.co.jp/mirai/

Mirai Shida (志田 未来, Shida Mirai; born May 10, 1993) is a Japanese actress. She became recognized after her breakthrough role as Kazumi Kanda in "Joō no Kyōshitsu" ("The Queen's Classroom") leading her to more prominent roles, such as Miki Ichinose in 14-year-old Mother.

== Biography ==
Shida was born in Ayase, Kanagawa. She married a non-celebrity in September 2018.

== Filmography ==
=== Film ===
- Kamen Rider 555: Paradise Lost (2003), Mina(Childhood)
- Tokusou Sentai Dekaranger The Movie: Full Blast Action (2004), a girl from the planet "Leslie"
- Amemasu no Kawa "First Love" (2004), Sayuri Takakura(Childhood)
- Spring Snow (2005), Satoko Ayakura
- Tsubakiyama Kachō no Nanokakan (2006)
- Kabei: Our Mother (2008), Hatsuko Nogami
- Dare mo Mamotte Kurenai (2009), Saori Funamura
- Shokudō Katatsumuri (2008), Momo-chan
- The Borrower Arrietty (2010), Arrietty (voice)
- POV: Norowareta Film (2012), Mirai Shida(Herself)
- Reunion (2013), Yūko Terui
- The Wind Rises (2013), Kayo Horikoshi (voice)
- Eiga ST Aka to Shirō no Sōsa File (2015), Shō Aoyama
- Mother's Trees (2015)
- Good Morning Show (2016), Saya Miki
- Yell for the Blue Sky (2016), Yūka Mori
- The Many Faces of Ito (2018), Shūko Nose (B)
- Laplace's Witch (2018), Tetsuko Okunishi
- My Hero Academia: Two Heroes (2018), Melissa Shield
- Fictitious Girl's Diary (2020)
- A Whisker Away (2020), Miyo, Tarō (voice)
- #HandballStrive (2020), Teruteru
- By the Window (2022), Yukino Arisaka
- Samurai Detective Onihei: Blood for Blood (2024)
- Acma:Game: The Final Key (2024), Ran Kuroda
- Shinpei (2025), Toshiko
- Until We Meet Again (2026), Rie Kubota

=== Television ===
- Eien no 1/2 (2000)
- Nukumori (2000), Kana Murayama
- Gekai Arimori Saeko II (2000), Rie Ogawa
- Shikei Dai no Ropeway (2001), Kyōko Fujiki
- Mariko (2001), Mariko(Childhood)
- Hatsu Taiken Episode 3, 4 (2002)
- Inubue (2002), Ryōko Akizu
- Shōnentachi 3 (2002)
- Bara no Jūjika Episode 5 (2002)
- Zako Kenji Ushio Tadashi no Jikenbo (2002), Senju Ushio
- Stewardess Keiji 7 (2003), Kyōko
- Kamen Rider Ryuki (2003)
- Honto ni Atta Kowai Hanashi: Haru no Kyōfu Mystery (2003), Marie
- Kawa, Itsuka Umie Episode 1 (NHK, 2003), Tami Honma
- Zako Kenji Ushio Tadashi no Jikenbo 2 (2004), Senju Ushio
- Itoshi Kimi e Episode 3 (2004), Rina Nakagawa
- Reikan Bus Guide Jikenbo Episode 6 (2004), Yuki Shinozaki
- The Queen's Classroom (Joō no Kyōshitsu) (2005), Kazumi Kanda
- Haru to Natsu (2005), Natsu Takakura
- Honto ni Atta Kowai Hanashi: Nanika ga Soko ni Iru (2005), Rie Sasada
- Zako Kenji Ushio Tadashi no Jikenbo 3 (2005), Senju Ushio
- Manbiki G-Men Nikaidou Yuki Episode 13 (2005), Aya Nakamura
- Tantei Gakuen Q (2006), Minami Megumi(Meg)
- Suppli (2006), Natsuki Konno
- 14-year-old Mother (14-sai no Haha) (2006), Miki Ichinose
- The Queen's Classroom Special: Datenshi Episode 1 (2006), Kazumi Kanda
- Watashitachi no Kyōkasho (2007), Asuka Aizawa
- Tantei Gakuen Q (2007), Minami Megumi(Meg)
- Dream Again (2007), Hina Asahina/Hina Fujimoto
- Kujira to Medaka (2008), Sachiko Imai
- Seigi no Mikata (2008), Yōko Nakata
- Voice: Inochi Naki Mono no Koe Episode 6 (2009), Tomoko Sōma
- Kurobe no Taiyō (2009), Mitsuko Takiyama
- Boss Episode 6 (2009), Yuki Ishihara
- Shōkōjo Seira (2009), Seira Kuroda
- Sakuramichi (2009), Miki Kobayashi
- Honto ni Atta Kowai Hanashi Special (2009), Yukari Mutō
- Sotsu Uta: Best Friend (2010), Ayumi Takano
- Hammer Session! (2010), Kaede Tachibana
- Himitsu (2010), Monami Sugita/Naoko Sugita
- Bull Doctor (2011), Mia Takeda
- Yonimo Kimyōna Monogatari: Aki no Tokubetsuhen (2011), Yuri Dōjima
- Ghost Mama Sōsasen: Boku to Mama no Fushigina 100-nichi (2012), Aoi Uehara
- Kagi no Kakatta Heya Episode 8 (2012)
- Black Board: Jidai to Tatakatta Kyōshi Tachi (2012)
- Reset: Hontō no Shiawase no Mitsukekata (2012), Tomoko Miyoshi
- Tazunebito (2012), Mitsuki Ōmae
- The Knife and the Sword (2013), Natsu
- ST: Keishichō Kagaku Tokusōhan (2013), Shō Aoyama
- Naru Youni Narusa (2013), Yōko Uchida
- Dandarin: Rōdō Kijun Kantokukan Episode 4 (2013), Yumi Sanada
- Naru Youni Narusa Season 2 (2014), Yōko Uchida
- The Knife and the Sword Part 2 (2014), Natsu
- ST Aka to Shirō no Sōsa File (2014), Shō Aoyama
- Masshiro (2015), Nana Matsuoka
- Daddy Sister (2016)
- The Supporting Actors (2017), herself
- The Many Faces of Ito (2017), Shūko Nose (B)
- Temp Staff Psychic Ataru (2019)
- Asagao: Forensic Doctor (2019)
- Yell (2020)
- The Supporting Actors 3 (2021), herself
- What Will You Do, Ieyasu? (2023), Ito
- Oshi no Ko (2024), Abiko Samejima
- The Hot Spot (2025), Mizuki Manabe
- Mirai's Future Son (2026), Mirai Shiokawa
- Mawaru Swan (2027), Chinatsu Aruga

=== Dubbing ===
- Tomorrowland (June 2015), Casey Newton (Britt Robertson)

== Commercials ==
- Tokyo Denryōku
  - IH Cooking Heater
  - TEPCO Hikari
    - "Mama no Manzoku (Shopping)" (May 2006 – November 2006)
    - "Ojīchan no Manzoku" (May 2006 – November 2006)
- Marvelous Interactive "Bokujō Monogatari Series"
  - Nintendo DS "Bokujō Kimi to Sodatsu Shima" (September 2006)
  - "Sekai ga Sodatsu" (December 2006 – present)
- KDDI "au"
  - Oyako de, au debut no Haru.
    - "Kenka" (February 2007)
    - "Chichi wa Tatsujin" (February 2007)
- House Foods Corporation "Fruity" (February 2007)
- Kankō Gakuseifuku (October 2008)
- Kyushu Telecommunication Network "BBIQ" (October 2008 – October 2012)
- Bridgestone Cycle "Albelt" (January 2009)
- Bourbon "Alfort Mini Chocolate" (September 2014)
- Level-5 Nintendo 3DS "Fantasy Life" (December 2012)
- Daihatsu "Move" (May 2013)
- Ajinomoto "Pal Sweet Bioligo" (April 2015)

== Bibliography ==
=== Books ===
- Mirai Nikki (Ameba Books, October 2009), ISBN 9784344991514

=== Photobooks ===
- 14-sai, 15-sai, 16-sai no Mirai (Kadokawa Marketing, 6 November 2009), ISBN 9784048950688
- Mirai: Chiisai Desukedo, Nanika? (Tokyo News Service, March 2012), ISBN 9784863362130
- Arigatou (Kadokawa, 11 January 2014), ISBN 9784047318892

== Awards and nominations ==
Year	Organization	Award	Work	Result
2006	Annual TV Life Awards 2006	Best Newcomer, Best Actress	14-year-old Mother	Won
2006	Galaxy Award (Japan)	Suisenshō	14-year-old Mother	Won
2007	15th Hashida Awards	Rookie of the Year	14-year-old Mother	Won
2010	2010 Elan d'or Awards	Newcomer Award	Herself	Won
2010	33rd Japan Academy Film Prize	Newcomer Award	Dare mo Mamotte Kurenai	Won
