= Tatsuya Fujiwara =

Japanese actor (born 1982)

- 藤原 竜也
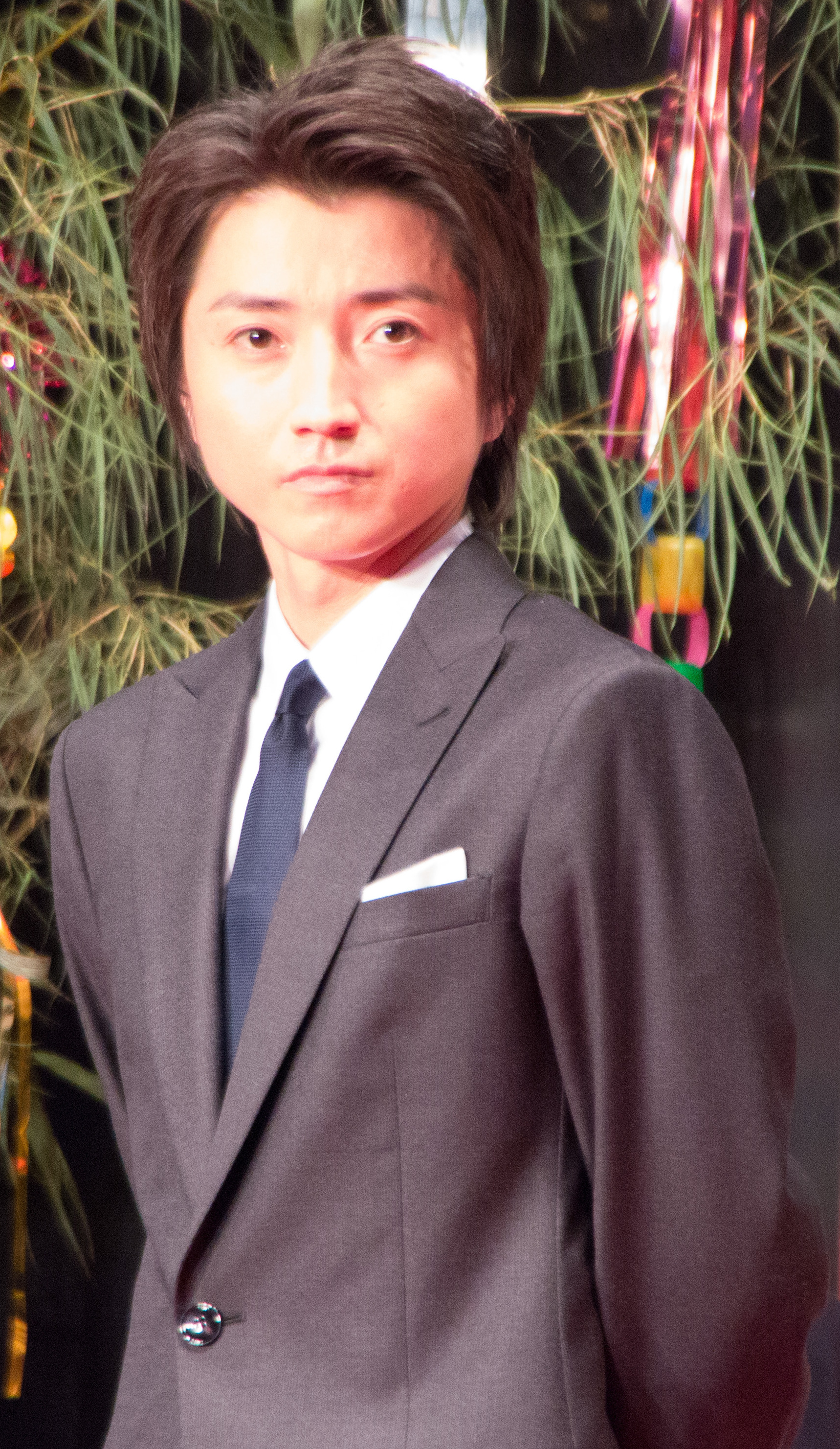
- Fujiwara in 2016
- Born: May 15, 1982 (age 44); Chichibu, Saitama, Japan
- Occupation: Actor
- Years active: 1997–present
- Agent: Horipro
- Children: 1
- Website: Tatsuya Fujiwara Official Fanclub "DRAGON aRROWS"

Tatsuya Fujiwara (藤原 竜也, Fujiwara Tatsuya; born May 15, 1982) is a Japanese actor. Internationally, he is best known for his leading roles as Shuya Nanahara in the Battle Royale films, Light Yagami in the Death Note films, Kaiji Itō in the Kaiji films, and Rikuhiko Yuki in Hideo Nakata's The Incite Mill. In 2014, he portrayed the villain Shishio Makoto in the live action Rurouni Kenshin films.

== Early life ==
Born in Chichibu, Saitama Prefecture, Fujiwara has had an interest in acting from a young age. In 2013, he married his long-term girlfriend. In the summer of 2016, they became parents. The name and gender of their child is unknown.

== Career ==
He is famous for acting the part of Shuya Nanahara in Kinji Fukasaku's controversial 2000 film Battle Royale. He continues the character as a leader of the "Wild Seven" in the sequel, Battle Royale II: Requiem.

He stars as Light Yagami, the leading role in Death Note and Death Note: The Last Name, films based on the manga of the same name. He also has a cameo appearance in L: Change the World, an L spin-off movie for the Death Note series. Fujiwara stated during filming that it was difficult to portray a character with such restrained emotions. During the filming of Death Note: The Last Name, Tatsuya became close friends with Kenichi Matsuyama, who plays L. Matsuyama mentioned that Tatsuya had done a good job.

In theatrical works, he is known for collaborating with Yukio Ninagawa, one of the most influential directors in Japan. He started his career in theatre, before his screen debut, with the title role of Shintoku-maru, the boy who has an obsessive relationship with his step mother. He has also acted in Shakespeare plays, including Hamlet and Romeo and Juliet. Fujiwara played one of the lead roles in Hideo Nakata's psychological thriller film The Incite Mill. Fujiwara has also done voice dubbing for IRIS along with Meisa Kuroki, Yuu Shirota and his Death Note co-star Hikari Mitsushima when Fujiwara plays Kim Hyun-jun played by Lee Byung-hun

He portrayed the role of Shishio Makoto in the sequels of Rurouni Kenshin in 2014. From January to February 2015, he will appear in Hamlet directed by Yukio Ninagawa at Sai-no-Kuni Saitama Arts Theater in Saitama and at Umeda Arts Theater in Osaka for the first time in 12 years. After that, he is scheduled to play the role in Taiwan in March and at Barbican Theatre in May 2015.

Hidayah Idris wrote in 2016 in the Singapore edition of the magazine Cleo that Fujiwara is "probably one of the most recognisable Japanese stars" in Singapore.

He appeared on the talk show Tetsuko's Room (TBS/TV Asahi) on 11 April 2025, where he discussed aspects of his life including his childhood dream of being a professional soccer player and his wife's role in the household.

== Filmography ==
=== Film ===
Year	Title	Role	Notes	Ref.
2000	Kamen Gakuen	Akira Dojima	Lead role	
2000	Battle Royale	Shuya Nanahara	Lead role	
2002	Sabu	Eiji	Lead role	
2003	Battle Royale II: Requiem	Shuya Nanahara		
2004	Moonlight Jellyfish	Seiji Terasawa	Lead role	
2006	Death Note	Light Yagami	Lead role	
2006	Death Note 2: The Last Name	Light Yagami	Lead role	
2008	L: Change the World	Light Yagami	Cameo	
2008	Chameleon	Gorō Noda	Lead role	
2008	Snakes and Earrings		Cameo	
2009	Zen	Hojo Tokiyori		
2009	Baton	Cipher	Voice role	
2009	Kaiji	Kaiji Itō	Lead role	
2009	Parade	Naoki Ihara	Lead role	
2010	The Incite Mill		Lead role	
2010	You Dance With The Summer	Shiro Takaki		
2010	Arrietty	Spiller	Voice role	
2011	Kaiji 2	Kaiji Itō	Lead role	
2012	Okaeri Hayabusa	Kento Ohashi	Lead role	
2012	I'm Flash!		Lead role	
2013	Wara no Tate	Kunihide Kiyomaru		
2014	In His Chart 2	Dr. Tatsuya Shindo		
2014	Sanbun no Ichi	Shu	Lead role	
2014	Monsterz		Lead role	
2014	Rurouni Kenshin: Kyoto Inferno	Shishio Makoto		
2014	Rurouni Kenshin: The Legend Ends	Shishio Makoto		
2015	ST 'Scientific Task Force' Aka to Shiro no Sosa File - The Movie		Lead role	
2015	Pokémon the Movie: Hoopa and the Clash of Ages	Barza	Voice role	
2016	Erased	Satoru Fujinuma	Lead role	
2016	Death Note: Light Up the New World	Light Yagami		
2017	Memoirs of a Murderer	Sonezaki	Lead role	
2018	Million Dollar Man			
2018	The Miracle of Crybaby Shottan			
2019	Diner		Lead role	
2019	No Longer Human	Ango Sakaguchi		
2019	Lupin III: The First	Gerard	Voice role	
2020	Kaiji: Final Game	Kaiji Itō	Lead role	
2021	The Sun Stands Still	Kazuhiko Takano	Lead role	
2021	Every Trick in the Book	Shin'ichi Tsuda	Lead role	
2022	Noise	Keita Izumi	Lead role	
2024	Hey Handsome!!	Hara		
2024	Saint Young Men: The Movie	Fallen angel Lucifer		
2027	AARO: All-Domain Anomaly Resolution Office – The Movie	Miyabi Okitama	Lead role	
2027	AARO: All-Domain Anomaly Resolution Office – The Movie 2	Miyabi Okitama	Lead role	
2027	Kaiji 4	Kaiji Ito	Lead role	

=== Television ===
Year	Title	Role	Notes	Ref.
1997	That's the Answer			
1998	Cyber Bishōjo Telomere			
1998	Feeling Relief Is Easy			
1998	Frozen Summer			
1998	Change!			
1999	LxIxVxE			
1999	Kiss of Heaven			
2000	The Things You Taught Me			
2001	Saintly Springtime of Life			
2001	Ikutsumono Umi o Koeru Te			
2001	Heaven's Coins 3		Lead role	
2002	I Cannot Say I Love You			
2002	Night of Being Concerned			
2003	Ai Gorin			
2004	Shinsengumi!	Okita Sōji	Taiga drama	
2004	Yatsuhakamura		Television film	
2005	Red Doubt			
2005	SunLight			
2006	Furuhata Ninzaburo			
2006	Sengoku Jieitai: Sekigahara no Tatakai			
2008	Tokyo Daikushu			
2010	Ojiichan wa 25-sai		Lead role	
2010	Wagaya no Rekishi	Osamu Tezuka	Miniseries	
2011	Piece Vote	Yu Wakitan		
2013	ST 'Scientific Task Force' Keishichou Kagaku Tokusouhan		Lead role	
2014	ST 'Scientific Task Force' Aka to Shiro no Sosa File		Lead role	
2014	Sherlock Holmes	Windibank and Hosmar Angel	Voice role	
2016	Lost ID	Shinichi Todo	Lead role	
2016	Moribito: Guardian of the Spirit	The Emperor		
2017	Reverse	Kazuhisa Fukase	Lead role	
2020	The Sun Stands Still: The Eclipse	Kazuhiko Takano	Lead role	
2021	Nakamura Nakazo: Shusse no Kizahashi		Miniseries	
2024	AARO: All-Domain Anomaly Resolution Office	Miyabi Okitama	Lead role	

=== Video games ===
Year	Title	Role	Notes	Ref.
2009	Yakuza 3	Rikiya Shimabukuro		
2016	Yakuza 6: The Song of Life	Yuta Usami		

=== Dubbing ===
Year	Title	Role	Notes	Ref.
1999	Stuart Little	Stuart Little		
2001	The Emperor's New Groove	Emperor Kuzco		
2002	Stuart Little 2	Stuart Little		
2009	Iris	Kim Hyun-jun		
2016	Independence Day: Resurgence	Jake Morrison		
