= Life 6 Sense =

Studio album by Uverworld
- Released: 1 June 2011 (Japan)
- Recorded: 2010–2011
- Genre: Rock; alternative rock; pop rock
- Label: gr8! records
- Producer: Uverworld; Satoru Hirade

Uverworld chronology
Last (2010)	Life 6 Sense (2011)	The One (2012)

Singles from Life 6 Sense
- 1. "Qualia (クオリア)" Released: 9 September 2010; 2. "NO.1" Released: 24 November 2010; 3. "Mondo Piece" Released: 6 April 2011; 4. "Core Pride" Released: 11 May 2011

Life 6 Sense (stylized as LIFE 6 SENSE) is the 6th album released on 1 June 2011. This album has a total of 12 tracks. The album was highly anticipated, as Uverworld themselves think highly of the album as they originally had 6 members including Seika, now Seika is their manipulator. This album was ranked #1 at the Ninki Chart and was charted at #2 for Oricon Weekly Ranking, charted for 16 weeks selling a total of 95,235 copies in its first week. The album also hit No.12 in Gano International Music Chart. The first track of the album, "Core Pride" has been featured in the "Blue Exorcist" anime television series as the first opening.

== Release ==
The song "Qualia" was released September 15, 2010. This song was used as an ending theme for the film Mobile Suit Gundam 00 the Movie: A Wakening of the Trailblazer. The B-side song "Ultimate" is the theme song for the PSP game Last Ranker which was released July 15, 2010. Its Oricon top #200 weekly peak is #2, selling a total of 65,525 copies in its first week.

== Track listing ==
CD SRCL-7603/SRCL-7604 (limited pressing)
No.	Title	Lyrics	Music	Length
1.	"Core Pride"	Takuya∞	Takuya∞, 彰	4:18
2.	"Itsuka kanarazu shinu koto wo wasureru na (いつか必ず死ぬことを忘れるな)"	Takuya∞	Takuya∞, 彰	3:47
3.	"Isseki wo Toujiru Tokyo midnight sun (一石を投じる Tokyo Midnight Sun)"	Takuya∞	Takuya∞	4:20
4.	"ace of ace"	Takuya∞	Takuya∞	3:19
5.	"NO.1 (album ver.)"	Takuya∞	Uverworld	4:53
6.	"Qualia (クオリア)"	Takuya∞	Uverworld	4:29
7.	"Secret (シークレット)"	Takuya∞	Takuya∞, 彰	3:48
8.	"Shousha Okubyoumono (勝者臆病者)"	Takuya∞	Takuya∞	3:19
9.	"Mutsu no Kaze (6つの風 album ver.)"	Takuya∞	Uverworld	3:25
10.	"Ichiokubun no Ichi no Shousetsu (一億分の一の小説)"	Takuya∞	Uverworld	4:33
11.	"Mondo Piece"	Takuya∞	Uverworld	5:28
12.	"Hakuchuumu (白昼夢)"	Takuya∞	Uverworld	3:20

Limited edition DVD
No.	Title	Length
1.	"GOLD" (music video)
2.	"Qualia (クオリア)" (music video)
3.	"NO.1" (music video)
4.	"Mondo Piece" (music video)
5.	"Core abilities Digest" (short edition)
6.	"Last Tour 2010.07.07 Digest at Zepp Tokyo"
