= Touch Off =

Single by Uverworld

from the album Unser
- Released: February 27, 2019
- Recorded: 2018
- Genre: Rock
- Length: 13:35
- Label: Gr8! Records
- Songwriter(s): Takuya∞

Uverworld singles chronology
"Good and Evil / Eden e" (2018)	"Touch Off" (2019)	"Rob the Frontier" (2019)

Music video
- "Touch Off" – 2019.06.06 Live at Okinawa on YouTube

"Touch Off" (stylized as "Touch off") is a single recorded by the Japanese rock band Uverworld, released through Gr8! Records on February 27, 2019. It reached 3rd place on Oricon chart, selling 33,340 copies in its first week. "Touch Off" was used as the season one opening theme for the 2019 anime The Promised Neverland.

== Background ==
According to Takuya∞, "Touch Off" was the first song they made in 2018 before "Odd Future" and "Eden e". At first, they made its basic sounds more hip hop with acoustic guitar and drums but they had not yet created the lyrics. Later Takuya∞ made the lyrics based on the anime The Promised Neverland, telling to keep fighting spirits and to not give up for getting freedom.

== Music video ==
The music video for "Touch Off" was directed by Masaki Okita, and features the band with hundreds of lighting and fire effects. Two versions of music videos were released by the band: the short version and the full version. Their official YouTube uploaded the short version on February 25, 2019, restricted to Japanese residents only. As of March 9, 2019, it has reached 542,094 views. The full version is available on the band's official website for a limited time.

== Track listing ==
No.	Title	Lyrics	Music	Length
1.	"Touch Off"	Takuya∞	Uverworld	4:20
2.	"ConneQt"	Takuya∞	Uverworld	4:56
3.	"Touch Off" (Instrumental)	Takuya∞	Uverworld	4:18
Total length:				13:35

Limited anime edition
No.	Title	Lyrics	Music	Length
1.	"Touch Off"	Takuya∞	Uverworld	4:20
2.	"ConneQt"	Takuya∞	Uverworld	4:56
3.	"Touch Off" (Short version)	Takuya∞	Uverworld	1:33
4.	"Touch Off" (Instrumental)	Takuya∞	Uverworld	4:18
Total length:				15:08

Limited edition bonus CD
No.	Title	Length
1.	"Shamrock" (Arena Tour 2018.12.21 at Nippon Budokan -Queen's Party-)	4:07
2.	"Eden e" (Arena Tour 2018.12.21 at Nippon Budokan -Queen's Party-)	4:10
3.	"Q.E.D" (Arena Tour 2018.12.21 at Yokohama Arena -King's Party-)	3:58
4.	"Good and Evil" (Arena Tour 2018.12.21 at Yokohama Arena -King's Party-)	3:39
Total length:		15:54

== Personnel ==
Uverworld

- Takuya∞ – vocals, rap, programming, lyrics
- Katsuya – guitar
- Akira – guitar, programming
- Nobuto – bass guitar
- Shintarō – drums
- Seika – saxophone

Additional musician

- Satoru Hirade – arrangement

== Charts ==
Chart (2019)	Peak position
Japan Hot 100 (Billboard)	4
Japan Hot Animation (Billboard)	1
Japan Weekly Singles (Oricon)	3
World Digital Song Sales (Billboard)	6

== Sales and certifications ==
Region	Certification	Certified units/sales
Japan CD	—	36,994
Japan Music download	—	27,047
Streaming
Japan (RIAJ)	Gold	50,000,000^{†}
^{†} Streaming-only figures based on certification alone.
