= Uverworld =

Japanese rock band

- Also known as: Überworld
- Origin: Kusatsu, Shiga, Japan
- Genres: Alternative rock; hip-hop; industrial; jazz fusion; alternative R&B
- Years active: 2000–present
- Label: Gr8!
- Members: Takuya∞ Katsuya; Akira; Nobuto; Shintarō; Seika
- Website: www.uverworld.com

Uverworld (stylized as UVERworld) is a Japanese rock band consisting of six members and originating from Kusatsu, Shiga. They have released eleven studio albums and over thirty singles and have sold over three million records worldwide.

"Uverworld" is a term coined by the band, combining the German word "über" (meaning "over") with the English word "world" to form a phrase that means "crossing above the world". While based in rock music, their sound incorporates elements of hip-hop such as rapping, scratching, and beatboxing, as well as heavy guitar riffs.

== History ==
=== 2000–2005: Beginnings and debut ===
The six-member band known as Uverworld first formed in 2002, and were known as Sound Goku Road (SOUND極ROAD; more popularly known as "Sangoku Road" in the independent music scene). The band originally consisted of seven members, and released Prime'03, a demo CD which ended up selling 3,000 copies. Unfortunately, Ryohei, the original lead vocalist, left the band. After Ryohei's departure, Ace∞Trigger renamed himself "TAKUYA∞" and they changed the name to UVERworld following Akira's idea. At the band's major debut, the saxophonist Seika was rejected by their record label, and could not debut together with the rest as a full band member. He remained as a support member until his hard-earned return in 2014.

According to an interview with the band, there was another vocalist who left the band. However, this vocalist has not yet been identified. Seika is the only one of the two credited on the demo CD and pictured with very early live photos of the band pre-Uverworld.

The year 2005 was the year that the band signed with the label Gr8! Records, which is under Sony Music Records. The band made their debut with the single "D-tecnolife", which was the second opening theme for the anime Bleach. The single made its debut in the Oricon charts at the fourth spot with 32,000 copies together with Mr. Children's twenty-seventh single, "Yonjigen Four Dimensions" (四次元 Four Dimensions) on the top spot. The single then later dropped to seventh place in the second week with 16,306 copies sold. The third week in the Oricon charts saw the single dropped 2 places to the ninth spot with 13,761 copies. The single lasted five weeks in the Top 30 weekly singles ranking. The single's sales and Chaku-Uta Full (着うたフル) downloads were certified gold by the Recording Industry Association of Japan.

Three months later, Uverworld's second single, "Chance!" was used as the commercial and opening theme for second PSP game of Bleach: Heat the Soul series. The band's second single first entered the Oricon charts on the fifth spot with 14,150 copies. The single later dropped to the 23rd spot selling 6,360 copies on the second week. The single's ranking remained the same, however the number of copies sold on the third week was fewer than the previous week with 5,495 copies. The single only managed to stay on the Top 30 weekly singles ranking for three weeks.

=== 2006–2008: Timeless, Bugright and Proglution ===
On January 25, 2006, the band's third single "Just Melody" ended up at number-seventeen on the Oricon charts. Three weeks later Uverworld's first album Timeless was released, breaking the Top 10 at number-five and selling 60,000 copies. Seika made a brief return during this album, playing saxophone for track 5, "Yasashisa no Shizuku" (優しさの雫). After a three-month break, Uverworld released "Colors of the Heart" as the third opening theme for Blood+, an anime series based on the animated movie, Blood: The Last Vampire. The single debuted at number-three and was the highest position any of Uverworld's singles had reached up to that time.

Their fifth single, entitled "Shamrock", was released on August 2, 2006, and was used as the ending theme for the drama Dance Drill, a show about a group of girls who aspire to become cheerleaders. Uverworld's sixth single was released on November 15, 2006, entitled "Kimi no Suki na Uta", the song was used as the theme song for the TBS TV show Koi Suru Hanikami! or Honey Coming! from the broadcast of October until December. It reached number two on the Oricon charts, which was the second highest place for an Uverworld single so far until it fell off of the charts three and a half weeks later. It sold around 79,659 copies according to the Oricon sales charts.

On February 21, 2007, Uverworld released their second album titled Bugright. It featured the singles Uverworld had released after Timeless. "Nagare, Kūkyo, This Word" (～流れ・空虚・This Word～) was included in the tribute soundtrack titled as The Songs for Death Note The Movie: The Last Name Tribute for Death Note. On March 6, 2007, the band was also part of an event called 'We Love Music Vol.2' held in the Shibuya-AX where Uverworld performed against Sid.

The band's third album, titled Proglution, was released on January 16, 2008, and contains a full eighteen tracks. The album also contains their singles "Ukiyo Crossing" (浮世Crossing), "Endscape" and "Shaka Beach: Laka Laka La" (シャカビーチ~Laka Laka La~). The album was released in a CD-only version and a limited edition that includes an extra DVD. Proglution sold over 150,000 copies. June 11, 2008, saw the release of the single "Gekidō/Just Break the Limit!". "Gekidō" was used as the fourth opening theme of the anime series D.Gray-man while the song "Just Break the Limit!" was used as a support song for Pocari Sweat's CM. Two more singles were released in 2008, "Koishikute" (恋いしくて) and "Hakanaku mo Towa no Kanashi" (儚くも永久のカナシ). "Hakanaku mo Towa no Kanashi" was used as the opening for the second season of the Mobile Suit Gundam 00 anime. The single became the band's first number-one single on Oricon, with approximately 181,784 copies sold. The single has since gone on to become the highest selling single from the band.

=== 2009: Awakeve ===
On February 18, 2009, the band released their fourth album titled Awakeve. The album sold over 115,000 copies on its first week, and ranked number-two on the Oricon album chart. A DVD of their live performance in Nippon Budokan was released on April 29, 2009. The band's thirteenth single was released on August 5, 2009, titled as "Go-On." The single's title track was featured as the second ending theme on the Japanese broadcast of the first season of House. The band performed at 2009's Inazuma Rock Festival held in Shiga Prefecture. They also released their fourth DVD of the Awakeve Tour 09 on September 30, 2009.

The band's fourteenth single was released on October 28, 2009, entitled "Kanashimi wa Kitto" (哀しみはきっと) for the Tokyo Broadcasting System drama Shōkōjo Seira, based on the children's novel, A Little Princess written by Frances Hodgson Burnett. The song's lyrics was written by Takuya and was co-composed by both the lyricist and Satoru Hiraide while the arrangement was done by the band and Hiraide. On October 9, 2009, an English official website was announced and it went online at 12 pm Japan Standard Time.

A best of album titled Neo Sound Best was announced on November 9, 2009, and released on December 9, 2009. They were also scheduled to perform at the 2010 Ontama Carnival together with Funky Monkey Babys and Flumpool.

=== 2010–2012: Last and Life 6 Sense ===
Their fifteenth single "Gold" was released on March 31, 2010, making it their first release of the year. The music video for "Gold" was made into 3-D, making it the first 3-D music video in Japan. It was premiered on April 17, 2010. Additionally, their fifth album Last was released two weeks later on April 14, 2010. Their sixteenth single "Qualia" (クオリア) was released on September 15, 2010, and contains the ending theme song for the Mobile Suit Gundam 00 movie and the title song for the PSP game Last Ranker.

Their seventeenth single "No.1" was released on November 24, 2010. "No.1" was featured as their opening song for their concert Last Tour Final at Tokyo Dome on November 27, 2010. Their eighteenth single "Mondo Piece" was to be released on March 23, 2011. However, due to the 2011 Tōhoku earthquake and tsunami, the release date was pushed back to April 6. It was also previewed at an earlier concert at the Tokyo Dome as their final song. Their nineteenth single "Core Pride" was selected to be the 1st opening theme for the anime Blue Exorcist.

The band released their sixth album Life 6 Sense on June 1, 2011. The album's title was leaked out in bands page on Japanese Wikipedia and the following month the band released their 6th DVD titled Last Tour Final at Tokyo Dome 2010/11/27. On December 14, 2011, the band released their twentieth single (second A-side single) entitled "Baby Born & Go/Kinjito". Blu-ray versions of UVERworld 2008 Premium Live at Nippon Budokan and Last Tour Final at Tokyo Dome were released on December 17, 2011.

On March 28, 2012, UVERworld released their 21st single entitled "7th Trigger" and 6 days later they released another Live DVD & Blu-ray UVERworld 2011 Premium Live on Xmas at Nippon Budokan which was at April 4, 2012.

=== 2012–2014: The One ===
On August 8, 2012, the band released their 22nd single "The Over" which was used as the ending theme of Kuro no Onna Kyoushi (黒の女教師). Three months later on November 28, 2012, the band released their 7th album entitled The One. After the release of 7th album, Uverworld released a re-cut single from their latest album entitled "Reversi". It was used as the movie theme song for Blue Exorcist -The Movie.

On August 14, 2013, the band released their 24th single "Fight for Liberty / Wizard Club'" as their first single of 2013. "Fight for Liberty" was used as the opening theme song for the anime Space Battleship Yamato 2199, while "Wizard Club" was used as the ending theme song for the TV series Kaikin! Bakuro Night.

On November 6, 2013, Uverworld release their 10th video and their first full "Men's Festival" concert footage Kings's Parade Zepp DiverCity (2013.02.08) on DVD and Blu-ray after their long period of The One Tour 2012–2013. Uverworld finally decided to have the full Live House Footage from Zepp DiverCity as their main concept instead of arenas, stadiums or halls. On December 18, 2013, the band released their 25th single "Nano-Second" (ナノ・セカンド) which was their second and last single of 2013.

On March 19, 2014, they released their 2nd video album UVERworld Video Complete -Act.2- from Life 6 Sense to The One promotional videos which also includes a Live bonus disc from 2013.12.25 Arena Live 2013 Winter Queen's Party at Nippon Budokan.

On March 26, 2014, it was announced that Uverworld would have their former member from Sangoku Road and live support member, Seika as their new 6th member to the group. On March 27, 2014, the band officially announced their next major concert would take place on July 5, 2014, at Kyocera Dome Osaka.

=== 2014–2017: Ø Choir ===
On June 18, 2014, Uverworld released their 26th single titled "Nanokame no Ketsui" (7日目の決意, "Decision of the Seventh Day") as their 1st single in 2014. Two weeks later, they released a new album entitled Ø Choir, which subsequently reached second place on the Oricon chart with 84,810 copies sold in its first week release. The album contains 14 tracks including a cover of "Born Slippy" originally by British electronic music group Underworld. Two versions of the album were released: one regular and one limited edition with the latter including a DVD which contains 50 minutes of previously unreleased footage. On August 19, the band announced their new 12th DVD King's Parade Nippon Budokan 2013.12.26, released on September 24, 2014.

On May 27, Uverworld released their 27th single "Boku no Kotoba Dewanai Kore wa Bokutachi no Kotoba" (僕の言葉ではない これは僕達の言葉, "Not My Words, This is Our Words"). The single was used for the anime series The Heroic Legend of Arslan. On August 26, they released another single titled "I Love the World" which was chosen as the theme song for the game Dragon Nest R in Japan. On September 30, 2015, the band released their 14th video content on DVD/Blu-ray titled King's Parade at Yokohama Arena 2015.01.10.

On June 8, 2016, Uverworld released their 12th video content on Blu-ray and DVD Uverworld 15&10 Anniversary Live which includes two concerts "15&10 Anniversary Live" recorded on September 3 and their first "Women's festival" footage recorded on September 6. Then a month later on July 27, Uverworld release their 29th single "We are Go / All Alone". Three months later on November 6, Uverworld released their 13th video footage entitled Uverworld Premium Live on Xmas 2015 at Nippon Budokan.

On December 17, 2016, the Blue Exorcist official website revealed several new promo trailers for its upcoming second season where it was revealed that Uverworld would again be providing the opening song for the series. "Itteki no Eikyō" (一滴の影響, "Drop's Influence") was released on February 1, 2017. Their 31st single "Decided" was featured on the live-action film Gintama.

=== 2017–present: Tycoon ===
On August 2, 2017, Uverworld released their 9th studio album Tycoon, three years and a month since their previous album. Originally they planned to include 20 new songs in the album, resulting in a recording time of about 90 minutes, which exceeded the time limit for the album. Eventually they decided to cut it down to 81 minutes by putting it in a single coupling and recorded tracks. Various parts of the album were cut and it fell within 78 minutes 59 seconds, to be adjusted before release. Despite the changes, their latest album was a success and ranked first in the Oricon Daily ranking within two days of its release. Their new album contains 18 tracks along with a limited edition bonus CD that includes recordings of their live performances.

On March 14, 2018, the band released their 4th "Men's Festival" concert recording entitled Uverworld King's Parade 2017 Saitama Super Arena. On May 2, 2018, they released 32nd single titled "Odd Future" which was chosen as the first opening theme for the third season of the anime series My Hero Academia. It peaked at number three on the Oricon chart, and reached fifth place on the Billboard Japan Hot 100. On November 7, 2018, they released a new single "Good and Evil / Eden e". "Good and Evil" was used for the Japanese dubbed version of Marvel's film Venom which was theatrically released in Japan on November 2, 2018.

On January 16, 2019, Uverworld released their 18th video album on DVD & Blu-ray titled Uverworld Tycoon Tour at Yokohama Arena 2017.12.21. It includes full live footage from their "Men vs. Women Festival" concert on vocalist Takuya∞'s birthday. A month later, UVERworld released a new single on February 27, 2019. It contains the song "Touch Off" and its instrumental version, and a song titled "ConneQt". "Touch Off" was used as the opening theme of the 2019 anime The Promised Neverland.

In 2020, the band's song "As One" featured as the theme song for the film Masked Ward. Their song "Wings Ever" was the official song of the 2024–25 M.League season, a Japanese professional mahjong league broadcast by Abema.

== Band members ==
- Takuya∞ (born December 21, 1979, in Osaka) — vocals, rap, programming
- Katsuya (克哉, born on February 22, 1980) — guitar, leader
- Akira (彰, born on March 8, 1984) — guitar, programming
- Nobuto (信人, born on February 14, 1980) — bass guitar
- Shintarō (真太郎, born on November 5, 1983, in Ōtsu, Shiga) — drums
- Seika (Note: Originally part of the band but left before their debut as Uverworld, rejoined on March 26, 2014.) (誠果, born on September 25, 1979, in Kusatsu, Shiga) — manipulator, saxophone

== Discography ==
=== Albums ===
==== Studio albums ====
Title	Album details	Peak position	Sales	Certifications
Title	Album details	JPN	Sales	Certifications
Timeless	Released: February 15, 2006; Label: Gr8! Records; Formats: CD, CD+DVD, digital download	5	JPN: 100,000+	RIAJ: Gold
Bugright	Released: February 21, 2007; Label: Gr8! Records; Formats: CD, CD+DVD, digital download	2	JPN: 136,956+	RIAJ: Gold
Proglution	Released: January 16, 2008; Label: Gr8! Records; Formats: CD, CD+DVD, digital download	3	JPN: 152,143+	RIAJ: Gold
AwakEVE	Released: February 18, 2009; Label: Gr8! Records; Formats: CD, CD+DVD, digital download	2	JPN: 162,458+	RIAJ: Gold
Last	Released: April 14, 2010; Label: Gr8! Records; Formats: CD, CD+DVD, digital download	2	JPN: 117,636+	RIAJ: Gold
Life 6 Sense	Released: June 1, 2011; Label: Gr8! Records; Formats: CD, CD+DVD, digital download	2	JPN: 131,253+	RIAJ: Gold
The One	Released: November 28, 2012; Label: Gr8! Records; Formats: CD, CD+DVD, digital download	4	JPN: 136,441+	RIAJ: Gold
Ø Choir	Released: July 2, 2014; Label: Gr8! Records; Formats: CD, CD+DVD, digital download	2	JPN: 112,234+	RIAJ: Gold
Tycoon	Released: August 2, 2017; Label: Gr8! Records; Formats: CD, CD+DVD, digital download	2	JPN: 113,000	RIAJ: Gold
Unser	Released: December 4, 2019; Label: Gr8! Records; Formats: CD, CD+DVD, digital download	1	JPN: 100,000	RIAJ: Gold
30	Released: December 22, 2021; Label: Gr8! Records; Formats: CD, digital download	2	JPN: 41,789	
Enigmasis	Released: July 19, 2023; Label: Sony Music; Formats: CD, digital download	2	JPN: 28,462	
Epiphany	Released: July 2, 2025; Label: Sony Music; Formats: CD, digital download	4	JPN: 27,553	

==== Compilation albums ====
Title	Album details	Peak position	Sales	Certifications
Title	Album details	JPN	Sales	Certifications
Neo Sound Best	Released: December 9, 2009; Label: Gr8! Records; Formats: CD, CD+DVD	3	JPN: 250,000+	RIAJ: Platinum
All Time Best	Released: July 18, 2018; Label: Gr8! Records; Formats: CD, digital download	2	JPN: 100,000+	RIAJ: Gold

=== Singles ===
Title	Year	Peak position	Sales	Certifications	Notes	Album
Title	Year	JPN	Sales	Certifications	Notes	Album
"D-TecnoLife"	2005	4	JPN: 100,000+	RIAJ: Gold	OP for the anime series Bleach.	Timeless
"Chance!"	2005	5	—N/a		OP for the second PSP game of Bleach: Heat the Soul.	Timeless
"Just Melody"	2006	17	—N/a			Timeless
"Colors of the Heart"	2006	3	JPN: 100,000+	RIAJ: Gold	OP for anime Blood+.	Bugright
"Shamrock"	2006	6	JPN: 100,000+	RIAJ: Gold	ED for the drama Dance Drill.	Bugright
"Kimi no Suki na Uta" (君の好きなうた)	2006	2	JPN: 100,000+	RIAJ: Gold	Theme song for the TBS TV show Koi Suru Hanikami! ("Honey Coming!").	Bugright
"Endscape"	2007	4	JPN: 100,000+	RIAJ: Gold	OP for the anime Toward the Terra.	Proglution
"Shaka Beach〜Laka Laka La〜" (シャカビーチ〜Laka Laka La〜)	2007	2	—N/a			Proglution
"Ukiyo Crossing" (浮世CROSSING)	2007	3	JPN: 100,000+	RIAJ: Gold		Proglution
"Gekidō/Just Break the Limit!" (激動 / Just break the limit!)	2008	3	JPN: 100,000+	RIAJ: Gold	"Gekidō" as OP of the anime series D.Gray-man.	AwakEVE
"Koishikute" (恋いしくて)	2008	3	—N/a			AwakEVE
"Hakanaku mo Towa no Kanashi" (儚くも永久のカナシ)	2008	1	JPN: 100,000+	RIAJ: Gold	OP for Mobile Suit Gundam 00 Season 2 anime.	AwakEVE
"Go-On"	2009	2	—N/a			Last
"Kanashimi wa Kitto" (哀しみはきっと)\	2009	2	—N/a		Theme song for the TBS drama Shōkōjo Seira.	Last
"Gold"	2010	2	—N/a			Last
"Qualia" (クオリア)	2010	2	JPN: 100,000+	RIAJ: Gold	Theme song for the anime film Mobile Suit Gundam 00 the Movie: A Wakening of the Trailblazer.	Life 6 Sense
"No.1"	2010	4	—N/a			Life 6 Sense
"Mondo Piece"	2011	4	—N/a			Life 6 Sense
"Core Pride"	2011	5	JPN: 100,000+	RIAJ: Gold	OP for the anime Blue Exorcist.	Life 6 Sense
"Baby Born & Go / Kinjito"	2011	2	—N/a			The One
"7th Trigger"	2012	2	—N/a			The One
"The Over"	2012	2	—N/a			The One
"Reversi"	2012	2	—N/a		Theme song of Blue Exorcist -The Movie-.	The One
"Fight for Liberty / Wizard Club"	2013	3	JPN: 100,000+	RIAJ: Gold	"Fight for Liberty" as OP for the anime Space Battleship Yamato 2199. "Wizard Club" as ED for the TV series Kaikin! Bakuro Night.	Ø Choir
"Nano-Second" (ナノ・セカンド)	2013	2	—N/a			Ø Choir
"Nanokame no Ketsui" (7日目の決意)	2014	2	—N/a			Ø Choir
"Boku no Kotoba de wa nai Kore wa Bokutachi no Kotoba" (僕の言葉ではない これは僕達の言葉)	2015	3	—N/a		OP for the anime series The Heroic Legend of Arslan.	Tycoon
"I Love the World"	2015	2	—N/a		Theme song for the game Dragon Nest R in Japan.	Tycoon
"We are Go / All Alone"	2016	4	—N/a		"We are Go" as OP for Puzzle & Dragons X anime.	Tycoon
"Itteki no Eikyō" (一滴の影響)	2017	2	—N/a		OP for the anime Blue Exorcist: Kyoto Saga.	Tycoon
"Decided"	2017	2	—N/a		Theme song for the live-action film Gintama.	Tycoon
"Odd Future"	2018	3	—N/a	RIAJ: Gold (st.)	OP for the anime My Hero Academia Season 3.	Unser
"Good and Evil / Eden e" (Good and Evil / Edenへ)	2018	2	—N/a		"Good and Evil" as the theme song for the Japanese dubbed version of Venom.	Unser
"Touch Off"	2019	3	JPN: 32,295		OP for the anime The Promised Neverland Season 1.	Unser
"Rob the Frontier"	2019	4	JPN: 23,030		OP for the anime The Seven Deadly Sins: Wrath of the Gods.	Unser
"As One"	2020	4	JPN: 23,797			30
"Hourglass"	2021	3			Theme song for the live-action film Brave: Gunjō Senki.	30
"Namely"	2021	4			ED for the anime The Seven Deadly Sins: Dragon's Judgement.	30
"Raichoue/Soul"	2021	3				30
"Avalanche"	2021	6			Theme song for the Japanese TV drama Avalanche.	30
"MMH"	2024				OP for the anime The Seven Deadly Sins: Four Knights of the Apocalypse's second season	MMH

=== Video albums ===
Title	Details	Peak positions
Title	Details	JPN
Live at Shibuya-AX from Timeless Tour 2006	Released: December 20, 2006; Label: Sony Music Japan; Format: DVD	34
Proglution Tour 2008	Released: October 1, 2008; Label: Sony Music Japan; Format: DVD	1
Uverworld 2008 Premium Live at Nippon Budokan	Released: April 29, 2009; Label: Sony Music Japan; Formats: BD, DVD	18 (BD); 2 (DVD)
Awakeve Tour '09'	Released: September 30, 2009; Label: Sony Music Japan; Format: DVD	7
Uverworld Video Complete: Act.1 First 5 Years	Released: July 7, 2010; Label: Sony Music Japan; Format: DVD	1
Last Tour Final at Tokyo Dome 2010/11/27	Released: July 6, 2011; Label: Sony Music Japan; Formats: BD, DVD	15 (BD); 1 (DVD)
Uverworld 2011 Premium Live on Xmas at Nippon Budokan	Released: April 4, 2012; Label: Sony Music Japan; Formats: BD, DVD	9 (BD); 1 (DVD)
Uverworld Yokohama Arena 2012.07.08	Released: January 30, 2013; Label: Sony Music Japan; Formats: BD, DVD	18 (BD); 3 (DVD)
Uverworld Documentary The Song	Released: April 17, 2013; Label: Sony Music Japan; Formats: BD, DVD	18 (BD); 1 (DVD)
King's Parade Zepp DiverCity 2013.02.28	Released: November 6, 2013; Label: Sony Music Japan; Formats: BD, DVD	24 (BD); 1 (DVD)
Uverworld Video Complete -Act.2-	Released: March 19, 2014; Label: Sony Music Japan; Formats: BD, DVD	8 (BD); 3 (DVD)
King's Parade Nippon Budokan 2013.12.26	Released: September 24, 2014; Label: Sony Music Japan; Formats: BD, DVD	13 (BD); 1 (DVD)
Live at Kyocera Dome Osaka 2014.07.05	Released: April 15, 2015; Label: Sony Music Japan; Formats: BD, DVD, digital download	4 (BD); 2 (DVD)
King's Parade at Yokohama Arena 2015.01.10	Released: September 30, 2015; Label: Sony Music Japan; Formats: BD, DVD, digital download	4 (BD); 1 (DVD)
Uverworld 15&10 Anniversary Live	Released: June 8, 2016; Label: Sony Music Japan; Formats: BD, DVD	5 (BD); 1 (DVD)
Uverworld Premium Live on Xmas 2015 at Nippon Budokan	Released: November 6, 2016; Label: Sony Music Japan; Formats: BD, DVD	5 (BD); 2 (DVD)
Uverworld King's Parade 2017 Saitama Super Arena	Released: March 14, 2018; Label: Sony Music Japan; Formats: BD, DVD, digital download	3 (BD); 3 (DVD)
Uverworld Tycoon Tour at Yokohama Arena 2017.12.21	Releasing: January 16, 2019; Label: Sony Music Japan; Formats: BD, DVD	3 (BD); 3 (DVD)

=== Guest appearances ===
Song	Year	Album	Album artist
"Saku, Adabana" (サク、徒花) (featuring Takuya∞)	2010	Dio New Source	Uzumaki
"Forever Young" (featuring Uverworld)	2016	Dawn	AK-69
"Forever Young" (featuring Uverworld)	2016	MUSO Collaborations: The Undefeated	AK-69
"One Life" (featuring Uverworld)	2018	MUSO Collaborations: The Undefeated	AK-69

== Awards and nominations ==
Year	Award	Category	Work/Nominee	Result
2005	Japan Gold Disc Awards	New Artist of the Year	Uverworld	Won
2013	Billboard Japan Music Awards	Animation Artist of the Year	Uverworld	Nominated
2020	Crunchyroll Anime Awards	Best Opening	"Touch Off" (from anime The Promised Neverland Season 1)	Nominated
2020	Space Shower Music Awards	Best Rock Artist	Uverworld	Nominated
2020	Space Shower Music Awards	People's Choice	Uverworld	Won
