= Koisuru Hanikami =

- Genre: Variety show
- Country of origin: Japan
- Original language: Japanese

Production
- Producer: Takahashi Ishibashi

Original release
- Network: TBS
- Release: October 3, 2003 – March 27, 2009

Koisuru Hanikami! (恋するハニカミ!) is a Japanese variety show that was broadcast every Friday afternoon at 11 o’clock on TBS. It was first aired on October 3, 2003, and last aired on March 27, 2009.
