= Awakeve =

AwakEVE

Studio album by Uverworld
- Released: February 18, 2009 (Japan)
- Recorded: 2008
- Genre: Rock
- Label: gr8! records
- Producer: Uverworld; Satoru Hirade

Uverworld chronology
Proglution (2008)	AwakEVE (2009)	Neo Sound Best (2009)

Singles from AwakEVE
- 1. "Gekidō(激動)/Just Break the Limit!" Released: June 11, 2008; 2. "Koishikute (恋いしくて)" Released: September 10, 2008; 3. "Hakanaku mo Towa no Kanashi (儚くも永久のカナシ)" Released: November 19, 2008

Professional ratings
Review scores
Source	Rating
Allmusic	3.5/5 stars

AwakEVE is the 4th full album released by Japanese band Uverworld as well as the follow-up to their third album, Proglution. It was released on February 18, 2009. A limited pressing of the album was also released on the same day which includes a DVD containing music videos of Roots, Gekidō (激動), Koishikute (恋いしくて) and Hakanaku mo Towa no Kanashi (儚くも永久のカナシ) as well as a video featuring the process of filming the music videos for Roots, Gekidō (激動).

The album entered the Oricon charts 15 times while its peak ranking was at 2nd. It was certified gold by the Recording Industry Association of Japan.

The title is a combination of the words awake and eve.

== Track listing ==
CD SRCL-6945/SRCL-6943～SRCL-6944 (limited pressing)
No.	Title	Lyrics	Music	Length
1.	"Gekidou (激動 AwakEVE ver.)" (Theme Song for D.Gray Man)	Takuya∞	Takuya∞	5:11
2.	"99/100 Damashi no Tetsu (99/100騙しの哲)"	Takuya∞	Takuya∞	5:13
3.	"Mikageishi (美影意志)" (Theme song for Fuji TV's drama series, Hataraki Man.)	Takuya∞	Takuya∞	5:55
4.	"Corona (コロナ)"	Takuya∞	Takuya∞	4:41
5.	"Hakanaku mo Towa no Kanashi (儚くも永久のカナシ)" (Theme song for the second series of Mobile Suit Gundam 00.)	Takuya∞	Katsuya, Takuya∞	4:09
6.	"earthy world"	Takuya∞	Satoru Hiraide, Uverworld	4:26
7.	"Hissei Satsuki Prologue (畢生皐月プロローグ)"	Takuya∞	Takuya∞	4:35
8.	"I Am Riri (アイ・アム Riri)"	Takuya∞	Takuya∞	4:21
9.	"Koishikute (恋いしくて)"	Takuya∞	Katsuya, Takuya∞	5:18
10.	"Forget"	Takuya∞	Uverworld	4:11
11.	"Just Break the Limit!"	Takuya∞	Akira, Takuya∞	3:37
12.	"Wa'on (和音)"		Akira	3:10
13.	"Harujion (2nd-MIX) (ハルジオン)"	Takuya∞	Akira, Takuya∞	4:50
14.	"YURA YURA"	Takuya∞	Akira, Takuya∞	4:56

Limited edition DVD
No.	Title	Length
1.	"Music clips" (Collection of the music videos for Roots, Gekidō (激動), Koishikute (恋いしくて) and Hakanaku mo Towa no Kanashi (儚くも永久のカナシ).)
2.	"Making movies" (A collection of the process of filming for the music videos, Roots and Gekidō (激動).)
3.	"99/100 Damashi no Tetsu (99/100騙しの哲)" (A secret track from the DVD that contains a video of the band recording the song.)

== Personnel ==
- Takuya∞ – vocals, rap, programming
- Katsuya – guitar
- Akira – guitar, programming
- Nobuto – bass guitar
- Shintarō – drums
