= Last (Uverworld album) =

LAST

Studio album by Uverworld
- Released: April 14, 2010 (Japan)
- Recorded: 2009–2010
- Genre: Rock
- Label: gr8! records
- Producer: Uverworld; Satoru Hiraide

Uverworld chronology
Neo Sound Best (2009)	LAST (2010)	LIFE 6 SENSE (2011)

Singles from LAST
- 1. "GO-ON" Released: August 5, 2009; 2. "Kanashimi wa Kitto (哀しみはきっと)" Released: October 28, 2009; 3. "Gold" Released: March 31, 2010

Last (stylized as LAST) is the 5th full album released by Japanese band Uverworld as well as the follow-up to their fourth album, Awakeve. It was released on April 14, 2010, under gr8! records label. A limited pressing of the album was also released on the same day which includes a DVD containing music videos of 99/100 Damashi no Tetsu (99/100騙しの哲?), Go-On and Kanashimi wa Kitto (哀しみはきっと?) as well as a video of the filming process for their 3 music videos and a bonus clip "Special Track 09.12.25: Turn Around with Gold" which is a Gold special video.

The album was one of the highly anticipated album and was ranked #2 at the Ninki Chart and was charted at #2 for Oricon Weekly Ranking.

The title means the present time's highest, newest and the ultimate album.

== Track listing ==
CD SRCL-7244/SRCL-7242 (limited pressing)
No.	Title	Lyrics	Music	Length
1.	"GOLD"	TAKUYA∞	Akira, TAKUYA∞	4:03
2.	"world LOST world"	TAKUYA∞	Akira, TAKUYA∞	4:59
3.	"Sparta (スパルタ)"	TAKUYA∞	TAKUYA∞	4:24
4.	"Kokoro to Kokoro (心とココロ)"	TAKUYA∞	Katsuya, TAKUYA∞	4:59
5.	"the truth"	TAKUYA∞	Akira, TAKUYA∞	4:12
6.	"Barrel (バーレル)"	TAKUYA∞	TAKUYA∞	4:19
7.	"Hai! Mondaisaku (ハイ!問題作)"	TAKUYA∞	UVERworld	5:27
8.	"closed POKER"	TAKUYA∞	Katsuya, TAKUYA∞	4:35
9.	"Kanashimi wa Kitto (哀しみはきっと album ver.)"	TAKUYA∞	TAKUYA∞, Hiraide Satoru (平出悟)	5:42
10.	"CHANGE"	TAKUYA∞	TAKUYA∞	3:50
11.	"WANNA be BRILLIANT"	TAKUYA∞	TAKUYA∞	3:31
12.	"Kimi no Mama (君のまま)"	TAKUYA∞	TAKUYA∞	4:18
13.	"GO-ON (2nd-mix)"	TAKUYA∞	Akira, TAKUYA∞	4:21

Limited edition DVD
No.	Title	Length
1.	"99/100 Damashi no Tetsu (99/100騙しの哲)" (Music video)
2.	"99/100 Damashi no Tetsu (99/100騙しの哲)" (Making of)
3.	"GO-ON" (Music video)
4.	"GO-ON" (Making of)
5.	"Kanashimi wa Kitto (哀しみはきっと)" (Music video)
6.	"Kanashimi wa Kitto (哀しみはきっと)" (Making of)
7.	"Special Track 09.12.25: Turn Around with GOLD" (Gold special video)

== Personnel ==
- Takuya∞ – vocals, rap, programming
- Katsuya – guitar
- Akira – guitar, programming
- Nobuto – bass guitar
- Shintarō – drums
