= The Promised Neverland season 2 =

The Promised Neverland
- Season 2
- Key visual
- No. of episodes: 11

Release
- Original network: Fuji Television
- Original release: January 8 – March 26, 2021

Season chronology
- ← Previous; Season 1

The second season of The Promised Neverland anime television series is based on the manga series of the same name written by Kaiu Shirai and illustrated by Posuka Demizu. It adapted the story arc "Promised Forest" (chapters 38–52) before turning towards an anime original direction starting within the beginning of "Search For Minerva" arc, all the while retaining a few themes and plot points of the original manga. On March 29, 2019, a second season was officially announced to be in production. The second season was originally set for an October 2020 release, but due to the COVID-19 pandemic, it was postponed to air from January 8 to March 26, 2021, on Fuji Television's late-night Noitamina programming block.

The opening theme song for the season is "Identity" (アイデンティティ, "Aidentiti") performed by Kiiro Akiyama, while the ending theme song is "Magic" (魔法, "Mahō") performed by Myuk.

== Episodes ==
No. overall	No. in season	Title	Directed by	Written by	Storyboarded by	Original release date	English air date
13	1	"Episode 1"	Takahiro Harada	Toshiya Ono	Mamoru Kanbe	January 8, 2021 (Note: Episode 1 was released on January 7, 2021 at 12:00 a.m. JST on streaming platforms and aired on January 8, 2021 at 2:10 a.m. JST, 45 minutes after the original air time on Fuji TV.)	April 11, 2021
Emma, Ray, and the escaped children of Grace Field House continue their journey on foot through a dark forest. They discover that a pen given to them by Norman belonged to William Minerva and contains a holographic map with coded messages referring to text in the House textbooks. Using the map, Ray determines Minerva's location and the children use information in their textbooks to help them survive. They are found and pursued by a giant demonic beast, and are forced to split up with Emma leading the children towards Minerva's location while Ray distracts the monster. Three demons kill the monster, but they continue to chase Ray after he states that he is the highest-scoring child of the House and the only survivor. He is saved when a hooded figure on horseback rescues him. Meanwhile, Emma and the children encounter a hooded woman who takes them to her sanctuary. Ray and Emma reunite when they awake in a cavern, but Ray soon realizes that the woman and man who saved them are both demons.
14	2	"Episode 2"	Ayako Kurata	Toshiya Ono	Ayako Kurata	January 15, 2021	April 18, 2021
Emma and Ray are reunited with the other children, and the female demon, Mujika, and the male demon, Sonju, reassure them that they are not like regular demons. They explain that for religious reasons, they do not eat humans in order to survive and that they are freelancers unassociated with the Houses. Sonju tells Emma and Ray about the history of their world. Thousands of years ago, humans and demons fought a long war which eventually ended with the humans and demons making peace and agreeing to live in their own separate "worlds"; the demon world, with several Houses breeding human offerings to appease the demons and a separate human world. However, Sonju warns them that as escapees, the children will not be welcome in the human world. As the children prepare to leave, they are trained by Sonju and Mujika in the skills needed to survive the wilderness. Gilda and Don confront Emma and Ray about their tendency to hide their problems and persuade them to be more open with the other children. Emma goes hunting with Sonju and he teaches her to kill living animals and then preserve them by using a vampiric plant called Vida which drains blood, as part of a ritual called Gupna. Emma is distressed by the process, but hides her emotions when she returns to the caves with food for the children.
15	3	"Episode 3"	Yayoi Takano	Toshiya Ono	Yoshiki Kitai	January 22, 2021	April 25, 2021
At the edge of the forest, the children part ways with Sonju and Mujika who gives Emma an amulet to remember them by. The children then head into a wasteland towards William Minerva's coordinates. Later, Sonju reveals to Mujika that he plans to eat the progeny of the children in the future if they breed and multiply. He then returns to the forest and kills the demons which had pursued the children, obliterating evidence of their passage. The children arrive at the coordinates, but see nothing. Ray uses Minerva's pen to locate an underground complex equipped with food, accommodation, and running water. The base has everything they need, including external surveillance cameras and the children realize that they could stay indefinitely. They also find a radio which they can use to monitor transmissions from the Houses. The children discover several secret passageways in the building, one behind a piano leading to a storage complex and one where the word "HELP" is scrawled across the walls. In one room they find a telephone, and when it rings, Emma answers the call and hears Minerva at the other end of the line.
16	4	"Episode 4"	Kakushi Ifuku	Toshiya Ono	Takahiro Miura	January 29, 2021	May 2, 2021
When Emma answers the telephone in the underground complex, she hears a recording left by William Minerva saying his real name is James Ratri and that he was associated with the farms. However, he objected to the system, so he created the underground refuge and left clues to its location in the Farms for any children who managed to escape. The recording provides clues to the locations of human society, but the children decide to rescue the children still on Farms first. The children settle into life in the shelter, growing, gathering and hunting food. One night, the complex is attacked by a troop of armed humans who have been sent by the demons to recover the children. They manage to escape through an undocumented exit, but as they approach the forest they are captured by waiting troops. Suddenly a monster demon attacks the armed humans, giving the children an opportunity to escape, but not before Ray wounds it by shooting an arrow into one of its eyes. Meanwhile back at the demon headquarters, Isabella is in prison for allowing the children to escape. A demon offers her freedom and more if she enables them to retrieve all of the escaped children, and she agrees.
17	5	"Episode 5"	Takahiro Harada	Seiko Takagi & Nanao	Mamoru Kanbe	February 5, 2021	May 9, 2021
The hunt for the escaped children continues while rumors spread among the demons that the Farms are being attacked. The fifteen young escapees make their home in an abandoned temple and monitor the reports from the Farms on a stolen radio set. They barely survive by hunting and obtaining supplies from local demon towns while disguised as demon children. While preparing for another expedition they encounter an old blind demon who visits the temple and Emma helps him, even though he detects that they are human which causes her to soften her attitude towards demons. On their next visit to the demon town, they are discovered by a pair of demons, but are saved by the appearance of Norman and other older humans, also disguised as demons.
18	6	"Episode 6"	Yoshiki Kitai	Nanao	Yukiko Imai	February 19, 2021	May 16, 2021
Norman explains to Emma and the others that he survived by being transferred to another farm, Lambda 7214, which was a testing site for children. He escaped with some other children with the help of a supporter of Minerva called Smee and they destroyed the facility. He explains that demons eat humans to absorb their intellect and abilities otherwise they degenerate into mindless beasts. He explains that he has developed a drug to cause demon degeneration and plans to use it against the demons in the town. However, Ray realizes that Emma does not want to kill all demons as some exceptions like Sonju and Mujika appear to survive without eating humans. He convinces her to discuss it with Norman, but when they arrive at Norman's headquarters, he is not there. They meet members of his band, Cislo, Barbara and Vincent who are all intent on killing demons. Norman returns, but when Emma tells him about Mujika, he refers to her as the Evil-Blooded Girl.
19	7	"Episode 7"	Ōri Yasukawa	Nanao	Ayako Kurata	February 26, 2021	May 23, 2021
Norman tells Emma and Ray that Mujika's blood has the ability to stop demons degenerating, but that all the demons she healed were killed and eaten by the king and nobles 700 years ago to selfishly protect themselves. Ray surmises that this gave demon royalty the ability to control demon society through management of the human meat supply. Records indicated that Mujika was also killed, but she must have survived and been in hiding ever since. Norman sees Mujika's ability to affect demons as a threat to humanity and believes that she and Sonju must be killed. Emma insists that killing Mujika and the demons is not necessary and they fiercely debate their options. Norman finally agrees to delay his plan for fives days while Emma and Ray try to find Mujika. However, Norman tells his Lambda group that he has no intention of altering his plans. Emma and Ray explain their intentions to the other escapee children, then leave with Gilda and Don to search for Sonju and Mujika. An epilogue shows Norman's departure from Grace Field House.
20	8	"Episode 8"	Hiroki Itai	Nanao	Hiroki Itai	March 5, 2021	May 30, 2021
A flashback to the day of Norman's departure from Grace Field House shows him being handed over to Peter Ratri who oversaw experiments on humans at Lambda 7214. After Norman scored highly in all his cognitive tests, Ratri saw in him an opportunity to control the children of the Farms. Realizing his lifespan was limited, Norman devised a way to contact other inmates. He then built a bomb to destroy the facility enabling their escape. In the present, Emma, Ray, Don, and Gilda use bird migration patterns to search for Sonju and Mujika. They manage to track them down before Norman's deadline but Norman has released the drug a day early. The demons begin degenerating, causing them to rampage through the city and setting it on fire. Norman enters the city and is about to kill a demon girl when her blind grandfather calls her name, Emma. Norman hesitates, and the demon halts the child's degeneration with his blood which has the same ability as that of Mujika. As Norman wavers in his conviction to kill all demons, Emma and Ray return to the city. Emma sees an apparition of Norman as a frightened child and realizes that he still needs her help.
21	9	"Episode 9"	Kakushi Ifuku, Sumito Sasaki & Takeshi Tomita	Nanao	Kakushi Ifuku	March 12, 2021	June 6, 2021
Emma tells Norman that he should not shoulder the responsibility of saving humanity alone, but he reveals that because of the drugs administered at Lambda 7214 he has does not have long to live. Sonju and Mujika protect them from a marauding demon, and Mujika begins the process of distributing her blood to reverse the demon degeneration process. Norman relents in his quest to kill all demons and his Lambda followers reluctantly agree. They receive news via the radio that Phil and the others at Grace Field House are about to be shipped, however it is a ploy by Peter Ratri to lure the escapees into a trap. Ratri plans to expand the Lambda model of drug-based brain development to avoid the need of high-cost farms to produce bright children for the Demon elite, although the farms will be continued for common Demons. The blind grandfather demon Vylk, a survivor of those saved by Mujika 700 years earlier, hands Emma part of a pen he retrieved 15 years earlier from a dying human. It contains not only a blueprint of the demon farm headquarters, but an antidote for the drug administered at Lambda. The small group of humans and demons make peace with each other. Together, Emma and Norman prepare to save Phil and the others. Vincent though contacts Grace Field to make a deal.
22	10	"Episode 10"	Ayako Kurata, Ryō Kodama & Shige Fukase	N/A	Ayako Kurata	March 19, 2021	June 13, 2021
Emma and Norman devise a plan to rescue Phil and the others from Grace Field House. On Norman's instructions, Vincent informs Peter Ratri that Norman plans to drop the drug to cause demon degeneration from airborne balloons. Ratri prepares for the attack and arranges for all the children to be brought to his headquarters while demons bring down the balloons, causing explosions and fires. Sonju and the Lambda children then launch their attack in a second wave of balloons while Norman, Emma and Ray break into Grace Field House. They save Phil and the others and reach the room containing the elevator to the human world, however Grandma Isabella and the Moms surround the children with firearms. Surprisingly, Isabella betrays Ratri and the moms follow after she reveals that the deadly chips in their chests having been hacked and nullified. Peter relies on demon reinforcements, but instead demon civilians cured by Mujika's blood break into the complex. His plans shattered, Peter breaks down, but Emma offers him her hand and an opportunity for everyone to live in peace together.
23	11	"Episode 11"	Yukiko Imai, Yoshiki Kitai & Hiroki Itai	N/A	Yukiko Imai	March 26, 2021 (Note: This episode aired on March 26, 2021 at 2:05 a.m. JST, 40 minutes after the original air time on Fuji TV.)	June 20, 2021
Peter Ratri explains how his older brother James took the alias "Minerva" and tried to help children escape the farms after he discovered that the children were their own descendants, and not the progeny of those who fought against the contract with the demons. Ratri refuses to accept that the world can be changed and kills himself before anyone can move. His death is later reported to the demon Queen and nobles. Emma forgives Isabella and the moms and invites them to cross into the human world with the children. They set the lift in motion and it takes them down to huge gateway. Norman unlocks the gate with the Minerva pen, and the children and moms cross over. However, Emma plans to remain behind to remake the "promise" between demons and humans, and Norman, Ray and the Lambda children along with Sonju and Mujika decide to help her. Emma leaves the children under the charge of Isabella and Vincent who are all welcomed into the human world. Meanwhile, Emma and her band battle to forge a new "promise" with the demons. They eventually succeed, with Mujika being crowned queen of the demons. Later, her group returns to human world where they are tearfully reunited with Don, Gilda, Phil and the other children.

== Recap special ==
No. overall	No. in season	Title	Directed by	Original release date
17.5	5.5	"Guidepost"; Transliteration: "Michishirube" (Japanese: 道標)	Eita Higashikubo	February 12, 2021
A recap episode of events comprising the first seventeen episodes in both seasons 1 and 2.

== Home media release ==
=== Japanese ===
Aniplex (Japan – Region 2/A)
Volume	Episodes	Release date	Ref.
1	1–4	April 7, 2021	
2	5–8	June 9, 2021	
3	9–11	August 4, 2021	

=== English ===
Aniplex of America (North America – Region 1/A)
Title	Episodes	Release date	Ref.
Complete Blu-ray Set	1–11	July 12, 2022	
