= The Promised Neverland season 1 =

The Promised Neverland
- Season 1
- Key visual
- No. of episodes: 12

Release
- Original network: Fuji Television
- Original release: January 11 – March 29, 2019

Season chronology
- Next → Season 2

The first season of The Promised Neverland anime television series is animated by CloverWorks and directed by Mamoru Kanbe, with Toshiya Ono handling series composition, Kazuaki Shimada handling character designs, and Takahiro Obata composing the series' music. It adapted the "Introduction" (chapters 1–9) and "Jailbreak" (chapters 10–37) story arcs from the original manga series of the same name written by Kaiu Shirai and illustrated by Posuka Demizu. The anime series was announced in the 26th issue of Weekly Shōnen Jump on May 28, 2018, and aired from January 11 to March 29, 2019, on Fuji Television's late-night Noitamina programming block.

Uverworld performed the season's opening theme song "Touch Off", while Cö shu Nie performed the season's ending theme songs "Zettai Zetsumei" and "Lamp".

== Episodes ==
No. overall	No. in season	Title (Note: The episode titles refer to the day the episode takes place in DDMMYY format, with the first episode beginning on 12 October 2045.)	Directed by	Written by	Storyboarded by	Original release date (Note: Episode 2 to 12 were available exclusively every Friday at 12:00 a.m. JST on Amazon Prime Video Japan, 55 minutes before the original air time on Fuji TV.)	English air date (Note: Adult Swim lists the series as premiering on April 13, 2019 at 12:00 a.m. (24:00) EDT/PDT, which is effectively April 14.)
1	1	"121045"	Hidekazu Hara	Toshiya Ono	Mamoru Kanbe	January 11, 2019 (Note: Episode 1 was released on January 10, 2019 at 12:00 a.m. JST on streaming platforms.)	April 14, 2019
In an orphanage known as "House", 38 children spend their days playing games, studying, and taking part in tests until they are eventually adopted. One night, after six-year-old Conny is taken out for adoption by the House's mother, Isabella, two of the smartest children in House, Emma and Norman, go to catch up with Conny to deliver a stuffed toy that she forgot. Passing the still-open gate, they discover Conny dead inside a truck and are forced to hide as Isabella trades Conny as "meat" for rich demons. Realising that the House is actually a farm raising humans as food for the demons, Emma and Norman rush back and become determined to escape with the other children. Meanwhile, Isabella discovers the stuffed toy Emma had left beside the truck when they fled.
2	2	"131045"	Yoshiki Kitai	Toshiya Ono	Kaito Asakura	January 18, 2019	April 21, 2019
Emma and Norman realize that the children are being shipped out based on their age and test scores, and older children with bigger brains are considered higher quality meat. They decide to escape before the next shipment in two months and explore the forest for an escape route. They come across a high concrete wall that they believe can be scaled with rope, but later realize that Isabella has tracking devices implanted on their bodies. Ray approaches them after they obtain tablecloths to use as rope, and they reveal their plan to escape with all 37 children. Ray reluctantly agrees to collaborate with them after being convinced by Norman. Later, Isabella introduces a new infant named Carol and an adult helper named Sister Krone, whom the three conspirators immediately perceive as another enemy.
3	3	"181045"	Satoshi Furuhashi	Toshiya Ono	Mamoru Kanbe	January 25, 2019	April 28, 2019
Emma, Norman and Ray re-evaluate their situation as they realize that they have been fitted with tracking devices and that Isabella and Krone suspect them. However, there is tension between the adults, and Krone covets Isabella's position. Emma examines the new infant Carol, and discovers that the tracking devices are implanted in everyone's ears. The trio use a game of tag to train everyone's readiness to escape, which is put to the test when Krone decides to take part, catching everyone except Norman and Ray. Later that night, the trio begin to suspect that one of the other children is a spy working for Isabella.
4	4	"291045"	Ryûta Kawahara	Chiaki Nagai	Kaito Asakura	February 1, 2019	May 5, 2019
The trio begin practicing tag with the other children in teams and Norman moves the date of their escape forward giving them just ten days to prepare. Later that evening, the trio share their secret with two other children, Don and Gilda, although Norman chooses not to tell them that Conny is dead. He lays a trap to determine who the informant is by telling them the location of their ropes and that night, Isabella receives a note from her informant. Meanwhile, Emma eavesdrops on Gilda as Krone tries to get information out of her, but Gilda chooses not to tell Krone anything. The following night, Norman inspects the rope locations with Ray, and by the process of elimination, accuses Ray of being the traitor.
5	5	"301045"	Kakushi Ifuku & Takahiro Harada	Chiaki Nagai	Yūki Itō	February 8, 2019	May 12, 2019
Norman's trap exposes Ray as Isabella's spy and Ray explains that he did so voluntarily to gain information which he could use to escape. Following a lengthy discussion about loyalty, Ray eventually agrees to side with Norman on the condition they give up the intention of saving everyone, but without telling Emma. Later, Ray reveals his duplicity to Emma, but she believes in his promise to still aid the escape. Meanwhile, Emma has deduced that there is a hidden room in Isabella's office where she reports to headquarters. They decide against searching for it, but despite being advised of the risks, Don and Gilda enter Isabella's office and find the entrance to the hidden room.
6	6	"311045"	Toshimasa Ishii	Toshiya Ono	Toshimasa Ishii	February 15, 2019	May 19, 2019
Emma tells Norman and Ray about finding morse code messages about the human farm on William Minerva bookplates in several books stored in the library. Meanwhile, Don and Gilda gain access to Isabella's hidden room where they discover a communication device and toys which belonged to the children who left the house and realize that they were lied to about Conny still being alive. They extract the truth from the others about the true purpose of the House, and despite some initial hostility over not being trusted, Don and Gilda reaffirm their desire to help everyone escape. The next day, Emma tells Norman she has an idea to get everyone out safely. Later, Norman finds some things left for him by Ray, and Don steals some chemicals for Emma's plan. Meanwhile, Ray learns from Isabella that he will be the next child to be shipped out. Outside, Krone confronts Emma and the others about them knowing the purpose of the House, and she offers to join forces.
7	7	"011145"	Shōhei Yamanaka	Seiko Takagi	Mamoru Kanbe	February 22, 2019	May 26, 2019
Krone proposes to the conspirators that they work together so their escape will cause Isabella's demise so Krone can become the Mom. She reveals she was once an orphan like them, but she can never leave her allotted area because of a deadly monitoring chip implanted in her chest. They agree to join her, but cannot trust her. That night Emma and Norman visit Krone and ask her a series of questions which she answers, but they also realize she knows more than she reveals. Meanwhile Ray receives an instant camera from Isabella as a reward for his assistance. The next day Emma and Norman prepare to climb the wall and inspect the vicinity, while Ray plants some confidential information about Isabella for Krone to find. Krone finds the note and is thrilled to discover what appears to be Isabella's "second weakness." Moments later though, Isabella presents Krone with official instructions that she is to be transferred out.
8	8	"021145"	Aika Ikeda	Seiko Takagi	Kaito Asakura	March 1, 2019	June 2, 2019
Krone has been appointed as Mom for Plant Four and has to leave immediately. She meets Grandma at the gate and tries to undermine Isabella without success. As Grandma leaves, Krone realizes that she is about to be killed by a demon. She recalls her life from when she was an orphan, the years of training to become a Mom, and hopes that the children can escape and destroy their current world. Meanwhile, the conspirators implement their plan to investigate the wall, while Isabella informs Ray that she has disposed of Sister Krone and that her deal with him is over. She locks him in a room, then uses her tracking device to detect and find Norman and Emma. As Don rescues Ray, Isabella finds Norman and Emma and tells them to stop resisting, explaining that they have lived happy and carefree lives and will die quickly. They refuse to accept this fate and Emma grabs Isabella so Norman can climb the wall, but Isabella breaks Emma's leg. Isabella then discloses that they are the best quality meat she has raised, fit for "the One", and that Norman will be shipped out the next day.
9	9	"031145"	Hiroki Itai	Chiaki Nagai	Hiroki Itai	March 8, 2019	June 9, 2019
The conspirators are determined not to let Norman die. Ray tells him to break the tracking device and pretend to escape so that he could hide and join the others in their planned escape. Norman refuses, saying it would only tighten security, which would make the escape for the others more difficult, and Emma or Ray might be shipped in his place. Emma suggests Ray break a bone or become sick to avoid this as the demons wouldn't ship damaged products, and Norman finally agrees. That night, Ray admits to Emma and Norman he knew the House's secret from the beginning as he was not affected by infantile amnesia. He can recall memories from when he was a baby, passing through the demon's headquarters and the gate before being brought to the House. The next day Norman prepares for his false escape, but the first tests to their escape plan is by scaling the wall to see the forest beyond. Surprisingly, he returns that evening and tells Ray and Emma escape is impossible – beyond the wall there is a wide and deep channel cut into the ground, completely separating the wall from the forest.
10	10	"130146"	Ayako Kurata	Seiko Takagi	Ayako Kurata	March 15, 2019	June 16, 2019
Norman tells the conspirators the entire farm is encircled by a channel and the only way to leave is through the gate, which leads to the demon's headquarters. Norman returns the device to break the trackers and that night, Norman says goodbye to everyone in the House. Emma hugs Norman in a last effort to get him to use the device to break the trackers and escape. He refuses, knowing it's too reckless and it would jeopardize the group's attempt to escape. At the gate, Isabella ushers Norman into a side-room to wait for the demons. Later, Don and Gilda ask Ray what the plan is now, but he has given up, apologizing. In the infirmary, Isabella offers to sponsor a crying Emma as a Mom candidate, saying if she completes her training she could return to the house as a Mother or Sister, but Emma refuses. Two months pass, Ray and Emma withdraw into themselves. The night before Ray is to be shipped out, he sits alone in the dining hall, saying goodbye to the house. When Ray asks Emma if she has really given up, she smiles.
11	11	"140146"	Kaito Asakura	Toshiya Ono	Kaito Asakura	March 22, 2019	June 23, 2019
On the evening before Ray's departure, Emma reveals she has never given up the idea of escape. While Isabella closely watched her and Ray, Don and Gilda continue preparing for their escape. Ray proposes they set the house on fire that night as a distraction. After Emma agrees, Ray reveals that he plans to set himself alight, to distract Isabella and deny the demons their feast. As the clock chimes midnight, the now twelve-year-old Ray starts the fire. As it spreads, the children evacuate and Emma severs her ear so she cannot be tracked. Isabella tries to extinguish the fire and save Ray, who she thinks is engulfed in flames, but the children had wrapped meat and hair in his clothes as a decoy. Months earlier, Norman told Emma of Ray's plan to burn himself and prepared a counter-plan for her, which meant that they were already prepared to escape. The children reach the boundary and prepare to scale the wall, but Ray notices the younger ones are not with them. Meanwhile, Isabella goes to contact headquarters, but finds the keyhole plugged. However, she manages to rescue the transmitter as the building burns. Outside, Isabella realizes that the children, including Ray, are alive. One little boy tugs at her skirt and she sees that it is Phil.
12	12	"150146"	Mamoru Kanbe & Yoshiki Kitai	Toshiya Ono	Mamoru Kanbe	March 29, 2019	June 30, 2019
The children reach and climb the boundary wall. In a flashback, Phil tells Emma that he suspected the purpose of the farm all along, and accepted that the under four-year-olds would stay, hoping to be freed before being harvested. Meanwhile, Isabella notifies headquarters of the fire and that 15 children have escaped. The alarm is sounded as the children prepare to cross the channel between the wall. After Don first throws a rope across the channel, the children begin to cross to the forest using ropes and coat hangers as zip lines. When there is no sign of the children at the bridge, Isabella runs along the wall and arrives in time to see Emma, the last child, cross into the forest before the lines are cut. Isabella recalls when she was a child on a farm watching her friends being harvested and began training to be a mom to survive. She gave birth before becoming Mom of Plant Three where she realized that Ray was her son after she heard him humming a familiar song. Isabella accepts defeat and wishes the children luck before removing the ropes and returning to the burning building where she tells Phil they successfully escaped. The escapees see their first sunrise outside the farm.

== Home media release ==
=== Japanese ===
Aniplex (Japan – Region 2/A)
Volume	Episodes	Release date	Ref.
1	1–4	March 20, 2019	
2	5–8	May 29, 2019	
3	9–12	July 24, 2019	

=== English ===
Aniplex of America (North America – Region 1/A)
Title	Episodes	Release date	Ref.
Complete Blu-ray Set	1–12	March 31, 2020	
