= The Promised Neverland (film) =

2020 Japanese film

- Theatrical release poster

Japanese name
- Kanji: 約束のネバーランド
Transcriptions
- Revised Hepburn: Yakusoku no Nebārando
- Directed by: Yūichirō Hirakawa; Jun Shiozaki (Note: Assistant director)
- Written by: Noriko Goto
- Based on: The Promised Neverland by Kaiu Shirai and Posuka Demizu
- Produced by: Ken Murase; Miho Kobayashi
- Starring: Minami Hamabe; Kairi Jo; Rihito Itagaki; Keiko Kitagawa; Naomi Watanabe
- Cinematography: Keisuke Imamura
- Edited by: Nobuyuki Ito
- Music by: Masahiro Tokuda
- Production companies: Fuji Television; Office Crescendo
- Distributed by: Toho
- Release date: December 18, 2020
- Running time: 120 minutes
- Country: Japan
- Language: Japanese
- Box office: ¥2.03 billion; US$17.7 million

The Promised Neverland (Japanese: 約束のネバーランド, Hepburn: Yakusoku no Nebārando) is a 2020 Japanese dark fantasy film. It is produced by Fuji Television, Office Crescendo and distributed by Toho. It is an adaptation of the manga series of the same name, created by Kaiu Shirai and Posuka Demizu. The story follows a group of the smartest kids at a seemingly perfect orphanage, who uncover its dark secret, and set in motion a dangerous and desperate escape plan.

It was released in Japanese theaters in December 2020. The film is directed by Yūichirō Hirakawa and produced by Ken Murase with a screenplay written by Noriko Goto. It stars Minami Hamabe, Kairi Jo, Rihito Itagaki, Keiko Kitagawa, Naomi Watanabe, Tori Matsuzaka and Yoshiko Mita.

The film was a commercial success, grossing over ¥2.03 billion ($17.7 million) in its theatrical release, making it amongst the highest-grossing films of 2021 in Japan. The Promised Neverland was also well received by critics, it was praised for its story, cinematography, themes and soundtrack.

== Plot ==
Emma, Ray, Norman and their siblings, all orphans, were placed in a special orphanage, known as Grace Field House when they were very young. Although their freedom is limited and the rules are sometimes a bit strict, the children lead happy lives at Grace Field House orphanage, and the woman they call "Mom" takes care of them, and gives them all the love a mother could give her children. But one evening, after the departure of one of their siblings, Emma and Norman discover that the children of this orphanage are actually being raised as livestock for demons, with the consent of their "Mom". To survive, they will have to be resourceful and try to escape.

== Cast ==
- Minami Hamabe as Emma
- Rihito Itagaki as Norman
- Kairi Jo as Ray
  - Ruito Yamashiro as Young Ray
- Keiko Kitagawa as Isabella
  - Natsuki Deguchi as Young Isabella
- Naomi Watanabe as Krone
- Yoshiko Mita as Grandma
- Tori Matsuzaka as Peter Ratri
- Halo Asada as Conny
- Miyu Ando as Gilda
- Soma Santoki as Don
- Yurito Mori as Phil
- Fuga Shibazaki as Nat
- Leilani Akimoto as Anna
- Motota Mizoguchi as Thoma
- Kousei Kimura as Lannion
- Adinan as Dominic
- Kit Furuhashi as Mark
- Misora Shimura as Alicia
- Sara Girard as Yvette
- Rupert Palmer as Chris
- Shizuku Ota as Sherry
- Haruka Sato as Jasper
- Sayuki Miyajima as Marnya
- Risa Kaneko as Nina
- Ariana as Jemima
- Nbaiare as Chamberlain
- Svediozas as Damdin
- Eden Kina Domerichi as Naila
- Dahlia N as Vivian
- Touma H as Hans
- Rikuto Ishizuka as Tom
- Poésie Yano as Carol
- Toshihiko Seki as Demon (voice)
- Hiroaki Tajiri as Demon (voice)
- Hiroo Sasaki as Demon (voice)

== Production ==
=== Development ===
The film was announced in September 2019, with a planned release date in December 2020. it was announced that Yūichirō Hirakawa would direct the film, Ken Murase the producer with Noriko Gotou handling the film's script.

The idea to adapting The Promised Neverland manga series into a live-action film adaptation came up after Ken Murase, the producer of the film, read the series at the Weekly Shōnen Jump magazine, where the series is originally published in a weekly format. He thought that the story is very interesting and was admired by the imaginative skill of the original author Kaiu Shirai, so he decided to make it into a live-action film. He immediately contacted Shueisha, the publishing company of the original story, to get the rights done and start working on it. The production staff faced much difficulties for creating the visual world of dark fantasy that does not exist in reality, this being the same for most fantasy stories. So they were conscious right from the beginning of the need to recreate the beauty of Grace Field House by rounding up the right staff and crew members for this production.

The film stars Minami Hamabe as Emma, Kairi Jo as Ray, Rihito Itagaki as Norman, Keiko Kitagawa as Isabella and Naomi Watanabe as Krone. The casting for Krone was met with controversy as the character is depicted being black in the manga and anime, while Watanabe herself is Japanese. Some settings have been changed from the original story, such as the maximum age at which orphans are "shipped" being raised from 12 to 16 and the appearance of Peter Ratri, played by Tori Matsuzaka.

=== Filming ===
Image of Tenkyokaku, location of Grace Field House in the film.

Production took place in Japan, and the filming occurred in the Important Cultural Property of Japan. The Grace Field House was photographed by adding a set to Tenkyokaku in Inawashiro Town, Fukushima Prefecture, the scenes such as the forest around the house was taken in Nagano Prefecture, Chino, Fujimi and Ina.

=== Visuals ===
For the lighting of the scene in which the demon appears, they placed the data of the demon in the Cinema 4D scene and used the GPU bias renderer Redshift to explore the lighting conditions in real time as proceeded with the settings.

The 3DCG and VFX production visuals of the monsters and the backgrounds were made by the Japanese creative group "khaki", using Cinema 4D. It took about half a year to finish the CGI production, shooting began in the summer of 2019, and after the filming was over, the concept design was started in the autumn or winter of 2019, and the production was done in January to July 2020. Even after that, they were making adjustments until the very last minute before the release date.

The main feature of this work's VFX is the monsters. Yasuki Miyano one of the production members was the one who undertook everything from the designs to asset production and even shot sculpting. At first, he started production with reference to the original manga. During the work, sketches drawn by the original author when writing the manga were provided as additional materials, and a concept model was created. They planned to make four monsters, but in the end they decided to make three from the viewpoint of balancing cost and quality. The production includes the creation of the background concept, from the concept design of the monsters to the modeling, to the final product. In addition to the gate and pillars, the Grace Field House is also added using CGI. The gate is made in Cinema 4D and rendered using Redshift, the inside of the gate also uses a lot of CGI as an addition to the set. Because of the budget, they were only able to build the first floor of the set, so they used Cinema 4D to make up for the shortfall.

=== Music ===
Japanese rock band Zutomayo performed the film's theme song "Tadashiku Narenai" (正しくなれない, "It Can't Be Right"). Masahiro Tokuda composed and scored the original motion-picture soundtrack, which is compiled into one whole soundtrack.

Soundtrack
No.	Title	Length
1.	"The Promised Neverland"	11:38
2.	"Grace Field House Orphanage"	1:46
3.	"Eisai Kyouiku"	1:16
4.	"Sakuno Mukoue"	1:21
5.	"Usodarakeno Sekai"	1:37
6.	"Watashitachiwa Taberarerutameni Ikiteiru"	2:34
7.	"Ikou, Konosakini Naniga Arunoka"	1:11
8.	"Sensen Fukoku"	1:11
9.	"Mama Isabella"	0:37
10.	"Full Score Sannin"	0:57
11.	"Kanshino Me"	1:06
12.	"Sister Krone"	2:05
13.	"Dou, Watashino Kodomotachiwa?"	2:23
14.	"Norman No Suiri"	2:08
15.	"Mama No Spy"	2:27
16.	"Subetewa Ima, Konotokinotame"	2:01
17.	"Mou Hitorijyanai"	2:42
18.	"Onito Ningenga Kimeta Yakusokuno Sekai"	3:12
19.	"Gasaireyo"	2:39
20.	"Zettai Nigeroyo, Kusogakidomo"	5:48
21.	"Ray, Emma, Norman No Kizuna"	1:37
22.	"Zettai Isshoni Nigeyou"	2:32
23.	"Darehitori Shinasetakunai"	3:38
24.	"Sekaiwa Kaerareru"	1:47
25.	"Akirametenai"	2:08
26.	"Orewa Ningenda!"	1:30
27.	"Norman No Sakusen"	2:20
28.	"Konnafuuni Sodatetekuretanowa Mama"	5:06
29.	"Leslie No Uta"	2:10
Total length:		73:15

== Release ==
=== Theatrical ===
The Promised Neverland was released nationwide in Japanese theaters on December 18, 2020. The film was also released in Vietnam on January 15, 2021, and in South Korea on April 7, 2022.

=== Television broadcast ===
The film was first broadcast in Japan on Fuji TV on April 2, 2022.

=== Home media ===
The Blu-ray and DVD for the film, including a special edition, was released in Japan on May 19, 2021. As of January 2022, The Promised Neverland is available to stream on Amazon Prime Video Japan.

=== Novel ===
A novelization of the film was released on December 18, 2020, in Japan. The novel was written by Nanao based on the screenplay of Noriko Goto.

== Reception ==
=== Box office ===
The film earned 288 million Yen (US$2.49 million) in its opening two day weekend, selling over 219.000 tickets. The cumulative total of three days from the first day was 373 million Yen (US$3.22 million) with 284.000 tickets sold. As of 2022, the film earned ¥2.03 billion ($17.7 million). The film was amongst the highest-grossing films of Japan in 2021.

=== Critical response ===
The Promised Neverland had an average rating of 3.2/5 based upon 10,589 reviews from the Japanese review aggregator Filmarks. The film has a score of 3.1/5 on the Japanese review aggregator Eiga, based on 386 reviews.

Writer Hideyuki Nakazawa gave the film 4 out of 5 stars, and describes it as "Watched with zero prior knowledge of the original comic. I thought it was a fantasy full of dreams and adventures, but it turned out to be a hard-hitting allegorical dystopia. A cruel secret hidden behind a peaceful orphanage where the children's bright smiles never cease. It was a hell disguised as a utopia. Children who know the fact try to escape to change their future and destiny. A false paradise that literally preys on innocent young people is like a mirror of modern Japanese society". The film was also praised by author Manabu Soma, giving it a 4/5 and praising its story and characters, saying " As a fan of the original work, I was worried about the age difference between the character settings and the actors, and the depiction of "demons", but the former was cleared by changing the settings, and the latter was overcome with CGI, and the story up to the escape from the house was skillfully summarized. It depicts in detail how difficult it is to escape, and is well-made as a thrilling escape play. The heroine Emma's strong feelings of "I don't want anyone to die" are also pulsating, and the drama is also very good. In that sense, the film adaptation accurately captures the spirit of the original work". Writer Kentaro Muramatsu also gave a positive review, by praising the performance of the main characters and the nature of the story. He added: "It is a movie of a genre that can be said to be a demon of demons even among Japanese movies, but it is quite worth seeing. I think that it is largely due to the persuasive power of Minami Hamabe, who plays the main role, and the presence of Keiko Kitagawa, who should be called the back star". He ended the review by recommending the film.

Bryan Tan from Yahoo! Life gave the film a positive review and a 4 out of 5 stars, citing: "The Promised Neverland movie adaptation imitates its manga counterpart with great surgical precision; every twist and turn in the plot was followed religiously by director Yūichirō Hirakawa with very little creative deviation. It is perhaps the most respectful homage one can pay to a series that has succeeded superbly in the manga/anime world, standing in stark contrast to other live-action movies like Bleach or Death Note that have flopped miserably". Cezary Strusiewicz of Crunchyroll wrote, "In Yūichirō Hirakawa's The Promised Neverland, hopelessness and resignation are alluring and tempting, and it is heartbreaking watching such young characters seemingly give in to them. At the same time, it also makes it that much sweeter when it turns out that they stood strong and still retained hope. These emotionally packed scenes are also when the actors deliver their hands-down best performances in the movie. The Promised Neverland is a story about the triumph of hope, which feels exactly like what we need right now. If that sounds like something you would enjoy, definitely check out this live-action adaptation".

Si Jia of Geek Culture website gave it a 7.6 out of 10 rating, and called it "The Promised Neverland is a polished take on an anime live-action adaptation that delivers in the areas that matter". Jeanmarie Tan of The New Paper gave the film 4 out of 5 stars, and stated: "this dark fantasy wields a shocking premise that poses provocative questions and provides edge-of-seat twists and thrills". Manfred Selzer of Asian Movie Web gave it a 6 out of 8, and describes the film as "Director Yūichirō Hirakawa composes wonderful pictures for this fairytale-like drama-thriller, and the soundtrack is also outstanding. The demons have a grotesque look that could come right out of a picture book, and the special effects are impressive all the way through as well. The sets, especially the orphanage, are also well-chosen. The Promised Neverland is definitely something for the eye. In the end, this manga adaptation is one of the successful ones, and especially if you can't compare it with the original, The Promised Neverland is a clear recommendation".

=== Accolades ===
Year	Award ceremony	Category	Result	Ref.
2022	10th VFX-JAPAN Awards	Excellence Theatrical Film Award	Won	
2022	10th VFX-JAPAN Awards	Best Theatrical Film Award	Nominated	

== See also ==
- List of films based on manga
