= Kaiu Shirai x Posuka Demizu: Beyond The Promised Neverland =

Japanese one-shot manga collection

- Cover of the tankōbon volume, featuring (from left to right) Ray, Norman, Emma, Poppy, Rita, Saburo Kono, DC3 and Saho

白井カイウ×出水ぽすか短編集 (Shirai Kaiu × Demizu Posuka Tanpenshū)
- Genre: Fantasy; Science fiction; Thriller
- Manga
- Written by: Kaiu Shirai
- Illustrated by: Posuka Demizu
- Published by: Shueisha
- English publisher: Viz Media
- Imprint: Jump Comics
- Published: September 3, 2021
- Volumes: 1

Kaiu Shirai x Posuka Demizu: Beyond The Promised Neverland (Japanese: 白井カイウ×出水ぽすか短編集, Hepburn: Shirai Kaiu × Demizu Posuka Tanpenshū; lit. 'Kaiu Shirai x Posuka Demizu Short Story Collection') is a Japanese anthology manga written by Kaiu Shirai and illustrated by Posuka Demizu. It features six standalone pieces of short stories published between 2016 and 2021 by the duo. The volume was published in Japan by Shueisha in September 2021. It was published in North America in November 2022 by Viz Media.

== Publication ==
Kaiu Shirai x Posuka Demizu: Beyond The Promised Neverland features six one-shot stories written by Kaiu Shirai and illustrated by Posuka Demizu; Poppy's Wish (ポピィの願い, Poppy no Negai), launched on February 18, 2016, on Shōnen Jump+. Spirit Photographer Saburo Kono (心霊写真師 鴻野三郎, Shinrei Shashinshi Kouno Saburou), published in Weekly Shōnen Jump on August 11, 2020. We Were Born (私たちは生まれました, Watashitachi wa Umaremashita), published in Weekly Shōnen Jump on January 4, 2021; and DC3 (デイーシースリー), published in Weekly Shōnen Jump on August 2, 2021. The collection included a previously unpublished one-shot specially drawn for the book titled Takashi and Poppy (タカシとポピー), and the Dreams Come True (夢が叶う, Yumegakanau) epilogue chapter for The Promised Neverland; the epilogue manga was first featured at an art exhibition for the franchise in Tokyo and was previously unpublished in any volume.

Shueisha released the collected tankōbon volume on September 3, 2021.

It was published on November 8, 2022, in North America by Viz Media.

=== Chapter list ===
No.	Original release date	Original ISBN	English release date	English ISBN
1	September 3, 2021	978-4-08-882781-0	November 8, 2022	978-1-9747-3471-9
1. "Poppy's Wish" (ポピィの願い); 2. "Spirit Photographer Saburo Kono" (心霊写真師 鴻野三郎); 3. "We Were Born" (私たちは生まれました); 4. "DC3" (デイーシースリー); 5. "Takashi and Poppy" (タカシとポピー); 6. "Dreams Come True" (夢が叶う)

== Reception ==
Author Masaki Tsuji enjoyed and praised the one-shot stories of the volume, in particularly the Spirit Photographer Saburo Kono chapter which he described as "a splendid composition". Tsuji was impressed by the breadth and depth of the base of human resources of the story.

Anime News Network gave it a 4 out of 5, and described the volume as "Each one shot is self-contained enough and combined, the volume does cover a variety of different stories with some more favorably leaning towards science fiction. Despite any differences in character or direction though, each chapter has this inexplicable charm and heart to it. The fact that Kaiu Shirai manages to cheat towards the end of the book and find a creative way to sort of connect all of the one shots together did not even phase me because for what is extensively a collection of random short stories, such a trick definitely felt earned".

The French website Manga News gave it a 15/20, and stated "these different stories turn out to be well-camped and, above all, sublimated by Posuka Demizu's immediately recognizable visual touch, which loses nothing of its sets and designs hiding lots of small details. This collection is therefore quite pleasant to follow as a whole. The stories imagined by Shirai, are well paced and rich in some good twists and subjects, while Demizu excels once again in their abundant and moving images". Lucie Ancion from the French website ActuaLitté praised the creativity and imagination of the duo, she also highlighted the themes of the short stories, writing "a new planet on which humans are a minority, a world where ghosts roam until they find rest, a society where artificial intelligence has become widespread, another where anarchy leaves no room for anything but violence. Each of the 4 main stories depicts a different universe, like a springboard to propel the genius to write the adventure as much as the emotion of Shirai and the exceptional pen of Demizu. This collection of short stories is teeming with creativity, it is an ode to friendship, brotherly love, generosity and devotion, agitated by eventful adventures and against a backdrop of sublime scenery. But it is also an opportunity to see how far the exceptional creative alchemy of this iconic duo of authors can go". The other French website Generation BD also gave the volume a positive review praising its story, characters and visuals, saying the result is a stunning short story collection, and described it as "it turns out to be very cheerful to read, sometimes with very pleasant, even funny double-level gags. All of them have their own and very detailed history. Very big surprise. Thus, one of the surprising aspects of these different short stories is the depth of the themes addressed; suicide, sacrifice for others, harassment, racism. In a handful of pages, the author manages to move us and surprise us by borrowing paths which, at first glance, are totally hidden from our view. Well done, the result is totally stunning".
