= LONA (TV series) =

Japanese anime television series

- Genre: Science fiction
- Created by: Akiko Nogi; Wit Studio
- Anime television series
- Directed by: Takashi Katagiri
- Written by: Akiko Nogi
- Music by: Hiroko Sebu
- Studio: Wit Studio
- Original run: April 2027 – scheduled
- icon

LONA (Note: An acronym for Laboratory of Optics and Neural Analysis) is an upcoming original anime television series produced by Wit Studio. The series is directed by Takashi Katagiri and created and written by Akiko Nogi, and features original character designs by Posuka Demizu, animation character designs by Yūdai Iino, and music by Hiroko Sebu. It is scheduled to premiere in April 2027.

== Synopsis ==
In a dystopian near-future, society faces a terrifying new crisis when people are attacked by individuals who were supposed to be dead. To handle the threat, the government turns in to the Laboratory of Optics and Neural Analysis (LONA). Researcher Ao and apprentice Sango take on the investigation, diving into the neural circuits and final memories of the deceased to uncover what dark secrets and visions lie in the depths of their minds before death.

== Characters ==
Ao (青)
Voiced by: Minako Kotobuki
Sango (珊瑚)
Voiced by: Anna Nagase
Mugen (無限)
Voiced by: Fūka Izumi
