= The Promised Neverland =

Japanese manga series and franchise

- First tankōbon volume cover, featuring (from left to right) Conny, Phil, Norman, Emma, Ray, Gilda, Mark, and Don

約束のネバーランド (Yakusoku no Nebārando)
- Genre: Dark fantasy; Science fiction; Thriller
- Manga
- Written by: Kaiu Shirai
- Illustrated by: Posuka Demizu
- Published by: Shueisha
- English publisher: NA: Viz Media
- Imprint: Jump Comics
- Magazine: Weekly Shōnen Jump
- English magazine: NA: Weekly Shonen Jump
- Original run: August 1, 2016 – June 15, 2020
- Volumes: 20
- Light novel
- Written by: Nanao
- Illustrated by: Posuka Demizu
- Published by: Jump J-Books
- Original run: June 4, 2018 – December 4, 2020
- Volumes: 4
- Manga

Oyakusoku no Neverland
- Written by: Shuhei Miyazaki
- Published by: Shueisha
- Magazine: Jump Giga (2018); Shōnen Jump+ (2019)
- Original run: July 26, 2018 – March 28, 2019
- Volumes: 1
- Anime television series
- Directed by: Mamoru Kanbe
- Written by: Toshiya Ono (1–21); Kaiu Shirai (13–21)
- Music by: Takahiro Obata
- Studio: CloverWorks
- Licensed by: AUS: Madman Entertainment; NA: Aniplex of America; SEA: Plus Media Networks Asia; UK: Anime Limited
- Original network: Fuji TV (Noitamina)
- English network: US: Adult Swim (Toonami); SEA: Aniplus Asia
- Original run: January 11, 2019 – March 26, 2021
- Episodes: 23
- Video game

The Promised Neverland: Escape the Hunting Grounds
- Developer: Goodroid
- Publisher: CyberAgent
- Platform: Android, iOS
- Released: JP: April 22, 2021
- Live-action film
- The Promised Neverland (2020)
- icon

The Promised Neverland (Japanese: 約束のネバーランド, Hepburn: Yakusoku no Nebārando) is a Japanese manga series written by Kaiu Shirai and illustrated by Posuka Demizu. It was serialized in Shueisha's shōnen manga magazine Weekly Shōnen Jump from August 2016 to June 2020, with its chapters collected in 20 tankōbon volumes. In North America, Viz Media licensed the manga for English release and serialized it on their digital Weekly Shonen Jump magazine. The series follows a group of orphaned children in their plan to escape from their orphanage, after learning the dark truth behind their existence and the purpose of the orphanage.

The Promised Neverland was adapted into an anime television series produced by CloverWorks and broadcast on Fuji TV's Noitamina programming block. The first season ran for 12 episodes from January to March 2019. A second season ran for 11 episodes from January to March 2021. A live-action film adaptation was released in December 2020. Amazon Studios is also developing an American live-action series. A musical stage play adaptation is set to debut in December 2026.

In 2018, the manga won the 63rd Shogakukan Manga Award in the shōnen category. By August 2026, The Promised Neverland had over 43 million copies in circulation, including digital versions, making it one of the best-selling manga series of all time. The manga has been overall well received by critics, particularly for its storytelling, characters and world-building. The first season of the anime series was well received, being considered one of the best anime series of the 2010s. Reception for the second season, however, was overwhelmingly negative, mainly due to its rushed pacing and simplification of the original manga's plot.

== Synopsis ==
=== Setting ===
In a strange world filled with sentient creatures of different species, an agreement called "The Promise" was made to end a long war between humans and the so-called demons. "The Promise" was an agreement where each would live in their own separate "worlds": the human world, free from the threat of demons; and the demon world, where human breeding farms were set up to provide food for the demons. By eating humans, demons take on their attributes which prevent them from degenerating into mindless monsters. In the demon world, a special breeding program was set up under the guise of orphanages; there, a human "Mother" would oversee the children to make sure they grew up as intelligent as possible. These children had identifying numbers tattooed on them and had no knowledge of the outside world. They believed that they were orphans and once they reached a certain age or intelligence, they would be taken out for adoption, but were fed to high-ranking demons instead.

=== Plot ===
In 2045, 1,000 years after the formation of "The Promise", the bright and cheerful Emma is an 11-year-old orphan living in Grace Field House, a self-contained orphanage housing her and 37 other orphans. They lead an idyllic life, with plentiful food, plush beds, clean clothes, games and the love of their "Mom", Isabella. Their education is seen as an important part of their development, and Emma, with her two best friends Norman and Ray, always excels in the regular exams. The orphans are allowed complete freedom, except to venture beyond the perimeter wall or gate which separate the house from the outside world. One night, a girl named Conny is sent away to be "adopted", but Emma and Norman follow with her favorite stuffed animal toy. At the gate, they find Conny dead and discover the truth about their existence in this idyllic orphanage—to be raised as meat for demons. Emma and Norman plan with Ray to escape from Grace Field House with the children, but Norman is taken off to be "adopted". Emma and Ray then decide to escape with some of their other siblings, leaving half of the younger children behind.

The escapees find life outside Grace Field House is filled with dangers, but under the leadership of Emma and Ray, they become determined to return to free their remaining siblings, along with children from the other Farms. They encounter demons of all descriptions, including Mujika and Sonju, who aid them in their quest. Emma and Ray later meet up again with Norman and together with their allies, they fight a battle for freedom against the demon queen Legravalima and the human Peter Ratri, who manages the Farms. Eventually, through her own determination, Emma secures the freedom of all the children and re-forges "The Promise", bringing all of them to the human world, but at the cost of her own memory.

== Production ==
=== Development ===
The series was first conceived in late 2013 from a draft titled Neverland; the title was later changed to The Promised Neverland due to copyright concerns. Kaiu Shirai submitted the 300-page draft to the Weekly Shōnen Jump editorial department. Editor Suguru Sugita described it as an ambitious work atypical for Jump, blending bright and dark scenes within a suspenseful fantasy world. Shirai noted that Sugita suggested limiting the series to around twelve volumes, comparable in length to Death Note.

Finding an artist whose style suited the story proved challenging. Shirai and Sugita considered Posuka Demizu a leading candidate due to her artistic fit for the series's imagery. Several other artists declined, citing the story's deviation from typical Jump manga or its perceived lack of commercial potential. Demizu's agreement was met with enthusiasm. Sugita compared the creative synergy between Shirai and Demizu to that of Death Note creators Tsugumi Ohba and Takeshi Obata. Prior to serialization, Shirai and Demizu published the one-shot Poppy's Wish (ポピィの願い, Poppy no Negai) on Shōnen Jump+ in February 2016. Its positive reception confirmed to Sugita that they were the right team for The Promised Neverland.

=== Inspirations ===
Shirai drew inspiration from international children's folklore and video games such as Final Fantasy for the setting, while the horror elements stemmed from his own imagination, as he does not enjoy horror films. He also cited childhood nightmares influenced by Hansel and Gretel, stories about children being eaten, and a manga about spirits, which led him to question whether monsters could resolve issues by raising humans like livestock.

Demizu cited Japanese folklore and its monsters, European fairy tales like Little Red Riding Hood and Hansel and Gretel, Naoki Urasawa's Monster, works from Studio Ghibli, and prison escape media such as Escape from Alcatraz, Papillon, The Great Escape, and the television series Prison Break.

The setting was inspired by Victorian England. Shirai aimed to disorient readers with a false lead suggesting a 19th-century English orphanage, while avoiding a specific time period. The English name "Grace Field House" appealed to him, and he noted the popularity of European urban design among Japanese audiences. Demizu used references from a two-month language study trip to England, particularly drawing on its forests and atmosphere.

=== Concepts and themes ===
Regarding the title's relation to Neverland from J. M. Barrie's Peter Pan, Shirai described it as a place with both playful and dark aspects, a duality he sought to convey in The Promised Neverland. The word "Promised" was added later during development of the post-escape story and was deemed significant enough to incorporate into the plot.

Despite its dark tone, Shirai chose to publish in Weekly Shōnen Jump rather than a seinen magazine, arguing that the story's themes were not age-specific and that it contained core shōnen elements like mutual aid and self-improvement. Using child protagonists aligned with the magazine's readership and facilitated reader identification; the theme of children rebelling against adults was selected as a classic narrative device. While acknowledging the series was darker than most Jump titles, the creators avoided extreme trends such as "ero-guro", excessive violence, or nonsense, using such elements only when necessary for the story.

Shirai stated that the concept of the lowest-performing students being the first harvested, while not necessarily a direct metaphor, was intended to encourage reflection on contemporary society. Although he admitted similarities to the Japanese education system, he clarified that the series was not meant as a critique but rather an exploration of family, school, and children's perspectives on adults. In response to interpretations by groups like PETA that the series advocated against industrial farming and promoted vegetarianism, Shirai stated he did not intend to impart moral values or moral judgments. He emphasized that the narrative does not explicitly condemn the demons and that the primary goal was entertainment, not social critique.

=== Writing ===
According to the 2020 fan book The Promised Neverland 0: Mystic Code, the writing of the final chapters was impacted by the COVID-19 pandemic. Shirai felt the length of chapters 179 and the finale restricted the content he wished to include.

== Media ==
=== Manga ===
Written by Kaiu Shirai and illustrated by Posuka Demizu, The Promised Neverland was serialized in Shueisha's Weekly Shōnen Jump from August 1, 2016, to June 15, 2020. Shueisha collected its chapters in twenty tankōbon volumes, released from December 2, 2016, to October 2, 2020.

In July 2016, Viz Media announced that they would digitally publish the first three chapters of the series on Weekly Shonen Jump magazine. Thereafter, they published the manga's new chapters simultaneously with the Japanese release. The first printed volume in North America was released on December 5, 2017. Shueisha began to simulpublish the series in English on the website and app Manga Plus in January 2019.

A 16-page one-shot chapter about Ray titled, The First Shot was published in Weekly Shōnen Jump on October 5, 2020. A 36-page one-shot chapter about Sister Krone titled, Seeking the Sky of Freedom was published in Weekly Shōnen Jump on December 7, 2020. A 19-page one-shot chapter about the children accomplishing their dreams in the human world titled, Dreams Come True was released at "The Promised Neverland Special Exhibition", event that was held in Tokyo from December 11, 2020, to January 11, 2021. A 32-page one-shot chapter about Isabella titled, A Mother's Determination was published in Weekly Shōnen Jump on December 14, 2020. A 32-page one-shot, titled We Were Born, which tells the story of "another The Promised Neverland", was published in Weekly Shōnen Jump on January 4, 2021. Both Dreams Come True and We Were Born were collected in the Kaiu Shirai x Posuka Demizu: Beyond The Promised Neverland tankōbon volume published on September 3, 2021, by Shueisha. It was published on November 8, 2022, in North America by Viz Media. A 36-page one-shot taking place after the manga's main story, titled Undying Blade, was published in Weekly Shōnen Jump on August 24, 2026.

In April 2026, a full-color digital version of the manga was announced, with the first ten volumes released on September 4 of the same year.

A comedic spin-off titled Oyakusoku no Neverland (お約束のネバーランド), illustrated by Shuhei Miyazaki (Me & Roboco author), was published in Jump Giga on July 26, 2018, and it was later serialized in the Shōnen Jump+ application from January 11 to March 28, 2019. Its chapters were collected in a single tankōbon volume, released on June 4, 2019.

=== Light novels ===
Four light novels by Nanao have been published. The first light novel, titled Yakusoku no Neverland: Norman kara no Tegami (約束のネバーランド～ノーマンからの手紙～; lit. 'The Promised Neverland: A Letter from Norman'), was released on June 4, 2018. The second light novel, titled Yakusoku no Neverland: Mama-tachi no Tsuisōkyoku (約束のネバーランド～ママたちの追想曲～; lit. 'The Promised Neverland: Moms' Song of Remembrance'), was released on January 4, 2019. The third light novel, titled Yakusoku no Neverland: Sen'yū-tachi no Rekōdo (約束のネバーランド ～戦友たちのレコード～; lit. 'The Promised Neverland: Records of Comrades'), was released on October 2, 2020. The story follows Lucas and Yuugo. The fourth light novel, titled Yakusoku no Neverland: Omoide no Film-tachi (約束のネバーランド ～想い出のフィルムたち～; lit. 'The Promised Neverland: Films of Memories'), was released on December 4, 2020, and takes place after the manga's finale. The novel is about Emma, Norman and their friends talking about their memories. A fifth light novel titled, Yakusoku no Neverland: 10-nen-me no Okurimono (約束のネバーランド ～10年目の贈りもの～; lit. 'The Promised Neverland: The 10th Year's Gift '), is set to be released on December 4, 2026. It will depict the lives of Emma and the others after the manga's finale.

=== Anime ===
An anime television series adaptation was announced in Weekly Shōnen Jump in May 2018. The series is animated by CloverWorks and directed by Mamoru Kanbe, with Toshiya Ono handling series composition, Kazuaki Shimada handling character designs, and Takahiro Obata composing the music. The series aired for 12 episodes from January 11 to March 29, 2019, on Fuji TV's late-night Noitamina anime programming block. It simulcasted on Amazon Video, but only in Japan, contrary to the contract giving Amazon exclusive streaming rights to shows that have aired on Noitamina since Spring 2016, as Wakanim has exclusive streaming rights in France. Uverworld performed the opening theme song "Touch Off", while Cö Shu Nie performed the ending theme songs "Zettai Zetsumei" (絶体絶命; lit. 'Desperate Situation') and "Lamp".

A second season was announced in March 2019. Originally scheduled to premiere in October 2020, it was delayed due to the COVID-19 pandemic. The second season aired on Fuji TV's Noitamina from January 8 to March 26, 2021. (Note: Fuji TV listed the air dates for the series on Thursday at 25:25, which is effectively Friday at 1:25 a.m. JST.) The main staff and cast members returned to reprise their roles and the original manga writer Kaiu Shirai collaborated with the scripts and supervised an original scenario for the season, although the last two episodes of the second season did not contain any writing credits due to the backlash the season had received. Kiiro Akiyama performed the second season's opening theme song "Identity" (アイデンティティ, Aidentiti), while Myuk performed the second season's ending theme song "Mahō" (魔法; lit. 'Magic').

In North America, the series is licensed by Aniplex of America and it began streaming on Crunchyroll, Hulu, Funimation and Hidive on January 9, 2019. Funimation added the English dub of the series to its streaming service on July 1, 2020. The anime's first season aired on Adult Swim's Toonami programming block starting on April 14, 2019. (Note: Adult Swim listed the series as premiering on April 13, 2019 at 12:00 a.m. ET/PT, which is effectively April 14.) Toonami aired the entire first season on the broadcast night of October 31, 2020, as part of its Halloween marathon. Toonami aired another marathon the series on October 29, 2022, as part of its Halloween marathon. The second season aired on Toonami from April 11 to June 20, 2021. It has been available for streaming on Netflix in Japan, Italy, Singapore, and Thailand by August 2020; it began streaming on the platform in North America and Latin America on September 1 of the same year. On January 28, 2022, both seasons were made available for streaming on Disney+ Japan. Madman Entertainment simulcasted the series on AnimeLab in Australia and New Zealand. The anime is licensed in the United Kingdom by Anime Limited.

The first season of the anime series substantially follows the manga and covers the story up to chapter 37, where the Jailbreak Arc ended. The second season is an abbreviated version of events which take place between chapters 38 and 181. There are also changes to the plot, the major ones being the omission of several arcs and characters.

=== Live-action film ===
A live-action film adaptation, directed by Yūichirō Hirakawa, was released in Japan on December 18, 2020. The film grossed ¥2,03 billion ($17.7 million) at the box office; and received mostly positive reviews from critics. It was nominated for two VFX-JAPAN Awards, winning one in the "Excellence Theatrical Film Award" category.

=== Live-action series ===
In June 2020, it was announced that Amazon Studios and 20th Television were developing an English-language live-action series adaptation of the manga for Amazon Prime Video. Spider Man: Into the Spider-Verse's Rodney Rothman is directing the series and Meghan Malloy is writing the pilot. Rothman, along with Death Note producer Masi Oka, and Vertigo Entertainment's Roy Lee and Miri Yoon are the executive producers of the series.

=== Video games ===
A mobile game based on the series called The Promised Neverland: Escape the Hunting Grounds was released on April 22, 2021. The game was announced on January 7, 2021, and by April 13, 2021, had received over 63,194 pre-registrations. The game is an online escape game, in which four players work together to escape a map based on The Promised Neverland series. Players control different characters, and they can use a variety of weapons and items to defeat demons. The game was developed by Goodroid, published by CyberAgent, and became available on iOS and Android.

A crossover event between The Promised Neverland and the mobile game Dragon Egg was held on May 22, 2020. A crossover with the mobile game Vivid Army was held from November 12–26, 2020. A crossover event with the video game Identity V was released on February 23, 2021. A second crossover event with Identity V was released on September 24, 2021. A crossover event, with the Japanese mobile game Jumputi Heroes, was released on March 15, 2021. A collaboration with the mobile game LINE POP2 was released on May 27, 2021.

=== Stage musical ===
In April 2026, it was announced that The Promised Neverland would receive a musical stage play adaptation. Theater group RKX International will perform "Musical The Promised Neverland" in Tokyo. The musical will commemorate the 10th anniversary of the series. Koki Kishimoto will handle the script, direction, and choreography, while Ryota Kojima will handle the composing, music direction, and singing guidance. The cast includes Yuki Awata as Emma, Minori Kumano as Norman, Kanna Ogasawara as Ray, Rihito Sato as Don, Momo Sakuma as Gilda, Kei Miyamoto as Isabella, Hiroko Kachi as Krone, and Mitsuo Yoshihara as William Minerva. The remaining Grace Field children are played by two groups of 20 child actors, named Team Bunny and Team Owl. The stage play will take place at Tokyo's Theater H between December 11–13, 2026.

=== Other media ===
An art book, titled The Promised Neverland: Art Book World (約束のネバーランド ART BOOK WORLD, Yakusoku no Nebārando Āto Bukku Wārudo), was released on November 4, 2020. It was published by Viz Media on June 21, 2022. It included creator commentary and interviews. A fan book, titled The Promised Neverland 0: Mystic Code (約束のネバーランド 0 MYSTIC CODE, Yakusoku no Nebārando 0 Misutikku Kōdo), was released on December 4, 2020.

An art exhibition, The Promised Neverland Special Exhibition, was held at the Mori Art Museum in Roppongi from December 11, 2020, to January 11, 2021. Additionally, a cafe event called "Cafe Grace Field" was held next to the exhibition venue. The design of the cafe was based on Grace Field House and sold various foods and drinks based on the series. The exhibition was held again from March 17 to April 5, 2021, in Osaka. From April 24 to May 9, 2021, it was held at the Nagoya Congress Center. From July 3–25, 2021, it was held in Okayama. From July 21 to August 16, 2021, it was held in Sapporo.

The series had an official podcast called "The Promised NeverRadio" which was hosted by Sumire Morohoshi the voice of Emma and Hiyori Kono the voice of Phil and ran for 66 episodes from January 7, 2019, to April 4, 2021. During the podcast Morohoshi and Kono would read emails and answer questions from fans. Fuji TV's anime programming block Noitamina celebrated its 15th anniversary with a special cinematic orchestra concert held at Tokyo International Forum, on May 29–30, 2021. The concert featured a line-up of the original soundtrack from the anime series that play during iconic scenes. Noitamina Shop & Cafe Theater in Tokyo held a free screening of the anime series every Saturday and Sunday in January 2019, in addition to a cafe event that sold various foods and drinks based on the series. Noitamina Shop & Cafe Theater held another cafe event for the series from August 17 to September 1, 2019, to commemorate Emma's birthday. From January 15 to January 24, 2021, Noitamina Shop & Cafe Theater held a cafe event to commemorate Ray's birthday. From March 13 to March 28, 2021, Noitamina Shop & Cafe Theater held a cafe event to commemorate Norman's birthday.

On July 14, 2018, the series got its own themed drink and coaster at the Shonen Jump cafe in Roppongi. The series did a crossover with the WIXOSS trading card game on April 20, 2019, which included an expansion pack themed to the series. The project was overseen by the manga's illustrator, Posuka Demizu, who had contributed art to the trading card game's cards in the past. The series did a collaboration with The Sky Circus Sunshine 60 Observation Deck in Tokyo from January 5 to February 11, 2019. The collaboration included a photo spot that recreates the post-apocalyptic world of the series, an art exhibition, limited edition goods, and original drinks inspired by Emma, Norman, and Ray. A collaboration with Princess Cafe was held in Ikebukuro, Akihabara, Osaka and Fukuoka from August 10 to September 8, 2019. The collaboration featured exclusive merchandise, food and drinks based on the series. A collaboration with Cookpad Studio was held in Osaka from September 4 to 30, 2020. The event included food and merchandise based on the series. A collaboration with Kanagawa Taxi Co., also known as Kanachu Taxi, was held from January 14 to March 17, 2021, in which artwork of characters from The Promised Neverland was placed on 88 of their taxi cars and customers were given artwork featuring Emma, Ray, and Norman. A collaboration with Megane Flower glasses was held on March 8, 2021, which included limited edition glasses frames designed after Emma, Ray, and Norman. A collaboration with Sony was released on September 2, 2021, and included limited edition electronic merchandise based on the series.

A collaboration between The Promised Neverland and Collabo Cafe Honpo was held in Akihabara and Nihonbashi from February 14 to March 8, 2020. The collaboration included original merchandise, food and drinks based on the series. A collaboration with Collabo Cafe Honpo LABO was held at the Ikebukuro East Exit Store in Kanto, Tokyo from August 8 to September 6, 2020. The event celebrated Emma's birthday and featured Emma, Norman, and Ray as plushies. The café runs under the same company as Collabo Cafe Honpo, but is a space that is specifically used for figures and plushies that customers can bring to do photo-shoots with miniature (inedible) foods, drinks, and tables. A traveling real-life escape game organized by SCRAP based on the series called "The Promised Neverland: Escape From The False Paradise" began touring Japan in March 2019. A second traveling real-life escape game organized by SCRAP based on the series called "The Promised Neverland: Escape From The Man-Eating Forest" began touring Japan on July 8, 2021. An event, in collaboration with Greenland Amusement Park in Arao, Kumamoto, called "Infiltrate the Greenland Farm" started on March 20 and was held until June 6, 2021. The event featured exclusive merchandise, food, and rides based on the series. A collaboration with Hotel Keihan at six different locations in Japan ran from June 1 to August 29, 2021. The collaboration featured six concept rooms nationwide with life-sized characters, animated setting pictures, original merchandise, voices from Emma, Norman, and Ray, and a mini exhibition. Due to the events popularity, original goods from the collaboration were sold until March 31, 2022. A hands-on, experience-based, immersive event called "Experience Museum The Promised Neverland Grace Field House Escape Edition" was held in Roppongi from July 17 to December 30, 2021. The event included an exhibition featuring a life sized replica of Grace Field House, various props, and characters from the series, as well as original merchandise. A cafe event called "Minerva Cafe" was held within the museum and sold various foods and drinks based on the series. A pop-up shop to promote the series was held at six different Loft Stores across Japan from February 11 to May 10, 2021. Another pop-up shop selling series-themed merchandise was open at the Tokyo Anime Center from January 21 to February 6, 2022.

== Reception ==
=== Manga ===
On Takarajimasha's Kono Manga ga Sugoi! ranking of top manga of 2018 for male readers, The Promised Neverland topped the list. The series won the "Shōnen Tournament 2018" by the editorial staff of the French website Manga-News. The manga was one of the Jury Recommended Works for the French 12th ACBD's Prix Asie de la Critique 2018. The Promised Neverland was one of the Jury Recommended Works in the Manga Division at the 21st Japan Media Arts Festival in 2018. The series was chosen as one of the Best Manga at the Comic-Con International Best & Worst Manga of 2018. The Promised Neverland has been added to The Nippon Foundation's Manga Edutainment 2020 list, to identify manga that are published as general works but can also open up new worlds and lead to learning.

On Da Vinci's magazine "Book of the Year" list, The Promised Neverland ranked 26th on the 2018 list; 35th on the 2019 list; eighteenth on the 2020 list; and 26th on the 2021 list. On TV Asahi's Manga Sōsenkyo 2021 poll, in which 150,000 people voted for their top 100 manga series, The Promised Neverland ranked 46th. Barnes & Noble listed The Promised Neverland on their list of "Our Favorite Manga of 2018". The Promised Neverland was included on the American Library Association's list of Great Graphic Novels for Teens in 2018; and 2019. On a 2021 survey conducted by LINE Research asking Japanese high school students "what manga series they are currently into", The Promised Neverland ranked second among girls, and tenth among boys.

The manga was recommended by manga artists Osamu Akimoto and Eiichiro Oda, who each wrote praising comments which were featured on the obi of the series's second and fourth volumes, respectively. Author Toshio Okada have also praised and recommended the manga.

==== Sales ====
The Promised Neverland was the 24th top-selling franchise in Japan in 2018, with estimated sales of ¥1.9 billion. It was the tenth best-selling franchise in 2020, with estimated sales of ¥3.5 billion. In September 2024, Shueisha revealed that The Promised Neverland was one of its Weekly Shōnen Jump's most profitable concluded series.

Throughout its serialization, every volume of The Promised Neverland was at the top of the sales charts. By August 2017, the manga had 1.5 million copies in circulation. By October 2017, the number increased to 2.1 million copies in circulation. By April 2018, the first 8 volumes had 4.2 million copies in circulation. By June 2018, the first 9 volumes had 5 million copies in circulation. By January 2019, the first 12 volumes had 8.8 million copies in circulation. By September 2019, the manga had over 16 million copies in circulation. By June 2020, the manga had over 21 million copies in circulation. By October 2020, the manga had over 25 million copies in circulation. By December 2020, the manga had over 26 million copies in circulation. By April 2021, the manga had over 32 million copies in circulation. By August 2022, the manga had over 41 million copies in circulation. By August 2023, the manga had over 42 million copies in circulation, including digital versions. By August 2026, it had over 43 million copies in circulation.

In Japan, The Promised Neverland was the eighth best-selling manga in 2018, with over 4.2 million copies sold. It was the fourth best-selling manga in 2019, with over 7.4 million copies sold. It was the sixth best-selling manga in 2020, with over 6.3 million copies sold. It was the sixth best-selling manga in the first half of 2021, with over 3.1 million copies sold. In 2018, the seventh volume of The Promised Neverland had an initial print run of 400,000 copies. In 2019, volume 18 had received an initial print run of over 600,000 copies; and the 20th volume in 2020 had an initial print run of 700,000 copies printed.

The first volume of The Promised Neverland appeared on The New York Times Best Seller list in March and April 2021. Individual volumes of the manga also ranked on NPD BookScan's monthly top 20 adult graphic novels list several times from 2018 to 2021. The Promised Neverland volume 1 ranked fourth on Publishers Weekly's bestseller list in March 2021. Volume 20 also made Publishers Weekly's bestseller list in September 2021, ranking tenth. The first volume sold 37,000 copies and 77,000 copies in the United States in 2020 and 2021, respectively. Additionally, The Promised Neverland ranked thirteenth on Rakuten's Top 100 Best Selling Digital Manga of 2021.

==== Critical reception ====
Leroy Douresseaux of Comic Book Bin gave the first volume a score of 9/10. Douresseaux praised the series for its characters, storytelling, and graphics, saying that the result is "a sinister, dark fantasy, and mystery thriller". Gabe Peralta of The Fandom Post, in his review of the first volume, praised it for its plot twists and suspense, giving it a "B+" and saying "The Promised Neverland feels like a modern Weekly Shōnen Jump comic in every respect—it's energetic and eager to please". Katherine Dacey of The Manga Critic enjoyed the series. Dacey wrote that she liked the world-building, crack pacing, crisp artwork, and a shocking plot twist in the first volume. She also praised the introduction of the principal characters and the main conflict.

Anime News Network's Rebecca Silverman enjoyed the first manga volume and gave it an A−, saying, "tense pacing, interesting literary connections, art and story work well together, strong plot and foreshadowing". Nick Creamer of the same website gave the second volume a B+ and called it a "unique and altogether thrilling story offers fun tactical drama and striking visual set pieces". Creamer praised the third volume of the series, saying that Sister Krone and Emma's new allies adds thrilling complexity to a story that is both tightly plotted and thematically biting. Mentioning that, the series continues to be one of the most unique and gripping shōnen tales around. He described the fourth volume as "it offers ever more reasons to check out this very unique manga" with its "excellent world and character-building, laying all the pieces in place for a truly thrilling escape, with a combination of alluring art and sturdy characterization". Creamer gave volume five and six an A−. Praising their transition phase with grace, offering some of the most exciting conflicts and beautiful set pieces of the story so far and pulling off the "big world-building reveal" with such intelligence. Reviewing volumes seven to nine, he wrote that "on the whole, setting the story's ambitions towards a new horizon while reintroducing some of the initial concepts that made this manga so thrilling continues to stride forward with tremendous confidence. The Promised Neverland's eighth volume may well be my favorite volume so far, and Demizu's art has never looked better". Adding that, Goldy Pond translates Neverland's core appeal into action theater, while the art keeps the fighting clear and the monsters terrifying.

Sean Gaffney from A Case Suitable for Treatment praised the storytelling and characters of volume eleven and twelve of the series, saying that "it continues to be one of the best Jump series I have read in years. A must-buy. Continuing to combine the best parts of horror and thrilling adventure, The Promised Neverland is still top-tier Jump". Sean also highlighted the new directions and themes of the series in volume fifteen, concluding with "most of this volume is made up of political intrigue (albeit among demons) and moral/ethical arguments. It is well written, and I think this is a very good volume. This is not The Promised Neverland we started off with, and that is a good thing, even though I do get nostalgic for the old suspense novel feeling. It is still well worth a read". In a review of volume fourteen and fifteen of the series, Wolfen Moondaughter of Sequential Tart says that they like the philosophical discussions of ethics, with great points made on both sides and the creative team did a great job showing the pros and cons of each side, and exploring how morality is not as easily defined or attained as we might wish. Moondaughter also praised the history part of volume sixteen and seventeen, saying that Geelan's story is tragic and offers a great parallel with Norman's, with both of them willing to accept losses now that they would not have accepted once upon a time; they concluded their review of the series by mentioning the story's ending in the final volume, stating "there are some nice final philosophical musings -- one of my favourite things about this series, so I'm glad that is still a hallmark in this last volume, it is fairly good, and made reading the series worthwhile".

The manga critic and author, Yukari Fujimoto describes the manga as "first of all, although it is a manga published in a shōnen magazine, the main character is a female. A lot of children appear, and the scenes of fighting and communal life are depicted, but there is no difference between men and women in their roles, it is very well balanced. The story development is interesting, and while this work was being serialized, I was looking forward to reading the next volume. Furthermore, at the end of the story, the focus is on expanding the limits and options of both demons and humans. This is also to dismantle the current gender order, such as recognizing the victimhood of men". Manga artist Hiroko Mizoguchi praised the series by saying that the drawings are wonderfully well drawn, the characters are also well drawn, and the story is magnificent and thrilling. She also highlighted the strong female leads. The Gender SF Study Group member Manami Tachibana stated that the story is a tale of adventure and a noble runaway, in which children in an orphanage realize that they are not orphans but farmed children to be eaten by monsters. She described the story as a game where you solve tasks one by one and move on to the next. She concluded by giving Shueisha a round of applause for publishing such a different story from the rest of their published works.

Masaki Tsuji lauded the manga, calling it a series that has "a clear start, turn, and conclusion", which he described as "rare for a long story that has gained popularity". He also wrote that it is one of the best series that have ended in recent years. Chengma Lingyi from Real Sound praised the good storytelling and worldview of the series, he also stated that Posuka Demizu's art is very beautiful, elegant, and spectacular. It also underlines the psychology and the suspense of the work, which confronts existence with "wisdom". He noted that in the last arc, in which the monsters eat people and demons at will, is a scene where the theme of this work is illustrated and it is the sad end of those who have monopolized wealth and sacrificed the weak. Lingyi added, "the dilemma of purpose and sacrifice is why The Promised Neverland has become a masterpiece full of reality".

==== Awards and nominations ====
Year	Award	Category	Result	Ref.
2016	Mandō Kobayashi Manga Award	New Serialization Award	Won	
2017	Mandō Kobayashi Manga Award	Manga Grand Prix	Won	
2017	1st Annual Tsutaya Comic Award	Next Break Division	Won	
2017	Manga Shimbun Taishō	Grand Prix	Won	
2017	10th Manga Taishō	Manga Taishō	Nominated	
2017	3rd Next Manga Award	Comics Division	2nd place	
2018	63rd Shogakukan Manga Award	Best Shōnen Manga	Won	
2018	22nd Tezuka Osamu Cultural Prize	Cultural Prize	Nominated	
2018	11th Manga Taishō	Manga Taishō	Nominated	
2018	24th Salón del Manga de Barcelona	Best Shōnen Manga	Nominated	
2018	2nd Annual Tsutaya Comic Award	All-Time Best	3rd place	
2018	2018 Google Play Awards	User Voting Excellence Award	Won	
2018	Ridibooks Comic Award	Next Trending Manga Award	Won	
2019	French Babelio Readers' Awards	Best Manga Series	Won	
2019	2019 Mangawa Awards	Best Shōnen Manga	Won	
2019	French Manga Prix	Best Manga Series	Won	
2019	23rd Tezuka Osamu Cultural Prize	Cultural Prize	Nominated	
2019	French Konishi Prize	Best Translated Manga	Nominated	
2019	Geeks d'Ouro	Best Manga Series	Nominated	
2019	Ridibooks Comic Award	Grand Prize	Won	
2019	Piccoma Award	Luna Prize	Won	
2019	Japan Expo Awards	Daruma for Best New Series	Won	
2019	Japan Expo Awards	Daruma for Best Screenplay of the Year	Won	
2019	25th Saló del Manga de Barcelona	Best Shōnen Manga	Won	
2020	Lucca Comics & Games	Amazon Comics Award	Won	
2020	French "Les Mordus du Manga" Awards	Grand Prize	Won	
2020	Anime Click Award	Best New Manga	Won	
2020	Anime Click Award	Most Wanted Manga	Won	
2020	20th Sense of Gender Awards	Grand Prize	Won	
2020	3rd Saito Takao Award	Grand Prize	Nominated	
2021	Geeks d'Ouro	Best Translated Manga	Nominated	
2021	25th Tezuka Osamu Cultural Prize	Cultural Prize	Nominated	
2021	52nd Seiun Awards	Best Comic	Nominated	
2026	Japan Expo Awards	Daruma for Finest Craftsmanship	Nominated	

=== Anime ===
Season 1 of The Promised Neverland holds a 100% on Rotten Tomatoes, based on 5 reviews. In February 2020, the anime series was awarded "Best Fantasy" at Crunchyroll Anime Awards, and Isabella won the "Best Antagonist" category. Polygon named the series as one of the best anime of the 2010s, and Crunchyroll listed it in their "Top 100 best anime of the 2010s". IGN also listed The Promised Neverland among the best anime series of the 2010s. The Brazilian website Legiao Dos Herois listed the series as one of "10 most successful anime" of 2010s.

The Verge also listed the anime series in its list of the best anime of 2019. James Beckett of Anime News Network ranked the series fifth on his list of best anime series of 2019. Toussaint Egan of Thrillist ranked the series third on his list of best anime of 2019. Season 2 of The Promised Neverland became the second biggest anime premiere ever on MyAnimeList behind Attack on Titan: The Final Season.

==== Critical reception ====
Brittany Vincent, writing a review of the first season for Syfy, praised the twist at the end of episode 1, saying that "Watching a seemingly idyllic community of happy-go-lucky kids seeing their realities destroyed in such a brutal way makes this a show that you just have to continue watching." Vincent particularly praised the animation and character designs saying: "These aren't your generic anime kids, with pink hair and zany costumes. The lead protagonist, Emma, hardly looks like your typical anime character at all, thanks to her shock of reddish blonde hair and her wide eyes". Furthermore, Vincent referred to the series as "A great cross between shows like Deadman Wonderland and Seraph of the End, with dreadfully creepy characters and a narrative that keeps you guessing the whole way through."

Allen Moody of THEM Anime Reviews gave the first season 4 out of 5 stars. Moody praised the series for its story and the characters' ability to "devise amazingly sophisticated strategies (and counter-strategies) that surprise the viewer as much as their foes", adding that the series "maintains a high level of psychological tension throughout, even though we're hit with unexpected explicit horror only a couple of times". Moody concluded: "I was fairly satisfied with the story we have here. There are heartbreaking developments and moments of pure horror, but the unquenchable human spirit is in here too."

The second season of The Promised Neverland, especially its final episode, received an overwhelmingly negative reception for what many felt was a rushed and forced ending. Rafael Motamayor of Polygon noted that while an original story is not inherently bad, the season, particularly from episode 5 onwards, disrupted its pacing and tension. In comparing it to the 2003 Fullmetal Alchemist anime series adaptation, which diverged from the source material but retained its essence, The Promised Neverland seemed to skip manga chapters "to be done with the story as soon as humanly possible", retaining a semblance of the plot but stripping away its emotional impact, and compared it to the final season of Game of Thrones.

Jairus Taylor of Anime News Network called the anime adaptation a "total disaster", criticizing the different approach compared to the original manga, which was meant to be a horror fantasy, "one that leans a little closer towards being a more linear version of Hunter × Hunter", than a mystery thriller akin to Death Note. While he acknowledged the suspenseful delivery, he noted the anime sacrificed world-building, internal monologues, and character depth, simplifying the manga's themes and messaging. Taylor speculated on the reasons for the changes in the second season, but, regardless of them, concluded that it "faceplanted pretty hard". He argued that even without skipping content, the anime was poorly equipped to handle the story past the Grace Field story arc, calling the adaptation a disappointing failure to live up to the manga's potential as one of Shōnen Jump's most thoughtful entries.

==== Awards and nominations ====
Year	Award	Category	Nominee	Result	Ref.
2019	41st Anime Grand Prix	Grand Prix	The Promised Neverland	4th place	
2019	41st Anime Grand Prix	Best Character (Male)	Norman	5th place	
2019	41st Anime Grand Prix	Best Character (Female)	Emma	Won	
2019	9th Newtype Anime Awards	Nogizaka46 Award (Monthly Newtype Joint Special Award)	The Promised Neverland	Won	
2019	IGN Awards	Best Anime Series	The Promised Neverland	Nominated	
2020	4th Crunchyroll Anime Awards	Anime of the Year	The Promised Neverland	Nominated	
2020	4th Crunchyroll Anime Awards	Best Protagonist	Emma	Nominated	
2020	4th Crunchyroll Anime Awards	Best Antagonist	Isabella	Won	
2020	4th Crunchyroll Anime Awards	Best Girl	Emma	Nominated	
2020	4th Crunchyroll Anime Awards	Best Drama	The Promised Neverland	Nominated	
2020	4th Crunchyroll Anime Awards	Best Fantasy	The Promised Neverland	Won	
2020	4th Crunchyroll Anime Awards	Best Opening Sequence	"Touch Off" by Uverworld	Nominated	
2020	4th Crunchyroll Anime Awards	Best Voice Artist Performance (Japanese)	Yūko Kaida as Isabella	Nominated	
2020	6th Anime Trending Awards	Anime of the Year	The Promised Neverland	Nominated	
2020	6th Anime Trending Awards	Man of the Year	Ray	Nominated	
2020	6th Anime Trending Awards	Man of the Year	Norman	Nominated	
2020	6th Anime Trending Awards	Girl of the Year	Emma	Nominated	
2020	6th Anime Trending Awards	Supporting Man of the Year	Phil	Nominated	
2020	6th Anime Trending Awards	Supporting Man of the Year	Don	Nominated	
2020	6th Anime Trending Awards	Opening Theme Song of the Year	"Touch Off" by Uverworld	Nominated	
2020	6th Anime Trending Awards	Ending Theme Song of the Year	"Zettai Zetsumei" by Cö shu Nie	Nominated	
2020	6th Anime Trending Awards	Best in Adaptation	The Promised Neverland	Nominated	
2020	6th Anime Trending Awards	Best in Ensemble	The Promised Neverland	Nominated	
2020	6th Anime Trending Awards	Best in Soundtrack	The Promised Neverland	Won	
2020	6th Anime Trending Awards	Drama Anime of the Year	The Promised Neverland	Won	
2020	6th Anime Trending Awards	Mystery or Psychological Anime of the Year	The Promised Neverland	Nominated	
2020	6th Anime Trending Awards	Best Voice Acting Performance by a Female	Mariya Ise as Ray	Nominated	
2020	6th Anime Trending Awards	Best Voice Acting Performance by a Female	Maaya Uchida as Norman	Nominated	
2020	6th Anime Trending Awards	Joint Character Wildcard	Ray	Won	
2020	6th Anime Trending Awards	Joint Character Wildcard	Phil	Nominated	
2020	6th Anime Trending Awards	Joint Character Wildcard	Don	Nominated	

== See also ==
- Borderliners, a 1993 novel with a similar premise
