= Japan Expo Awards =

Anime and manga awards ceremony

- Description: manga and anime award ceremony
- Country: France
- Website: http://www.japan-expo-awards.com/

The Japan Expo Awards are an award ceremony created in 2006 for the Japan Expo convention. They reward the best productions in the worlds of manga and anime, awarded by a jury of professionals and separate public prizes.

Previously, they also rewarded the best productions in the worlds of Asian films, video games and J-Music, based on the average of the votes of a jury of professionals and the public.

After a stop of the awards in 2013, the Japan Expo Awards are back in 2016 with a new formula.

== Awards ==
=== 2006 ===
Manga Category Winners

- Shōnen Award: Naruto by Masashi Kishimoto (Kana)
- Shōjo Award: Fruits Basket by Natsuki Takaya (Akata/Delcourt)
- Seinen Award: Monster by Naoki Urasawa (Kana)
- Moriawase Award: Vagabond by Takehiko Inoue (Tonkam)
- Drawing Award: Bleach by Tite Kubo (Glénat Éditions)
- Scenario Award: Monster by Naoki Urasawa (Kana)
- Adaptation Award: One Piece by Eiichirō Oda (Glénat Éditions)
- Manufacturing Award: xxxHolic by Clamp (Pika Édition)

Anime Category Winners

- Shōnen Award: Fullmetal Alchemist (Dybex)
- Shōjo Award: Cardcaptor Sakura (IDP)
- Seinen Award: Wolf's Rain (Beez Entertainment)
- Moriawase Award: Haibane Renmei (Dybex)
- Drawing Award: Samurai Champloo (Dybex)
- Scenario Award: Fullmetal Alchemist (Dybex)
- Dubbing Award: Fullmetal Alchemist (Dybex)
- Packaging Award: Samurai Champloo (Dybex)

=== 2007 ===
Manga Category Winners – Jury Prize

- Grand Prize: Death Note by Takeshi Obata and Tsugumi Ōba (Kana)
- Shōnen Category: C [si:] by Yuko Osada (Doki-Doki)
- Shōjo Category: Fruits Basket by Natsuki Takaya (Akata/Delcourt)
- Seinen Category: Berserk by Kentaro Miura (Glénat Éditions)
- Moriawase Category: Town of Evening Calm, Country of Cherry Blossoms by Fumiyo Kōno (Kana)
- Drawing Category: Real by Takehiko Inoue (Kana)
- Scenario Category: Death Note by Takeshi Obata and Tsugumi Ohba (Kana)
- Translation / Adaptation Category: Manga Science by Yohitoh Asari (Pika Édition)
- Production Category: GoGo Monster by Taiyō Matsumoto (Akata/Delcourt)

Anime Category Winners – Jury Prize

- Grand Prize: Paranoia Agent (Dybex)
- Shōnen Category: Samurai Champloo (Dybex)
- Shōjo Category: Nana (Kazé)
- Seinen Category: Paranoia Agent (Dybex)
- Moriawase Category: Genshiken (Kazé)
- Character Design Category: Ergo Proxy (Dybex)
- Scenario Category: Ghost in the Shell (Beez)
- French Version Category: Monster (Kazé)
- Packaging Category: Karas – Collector's Edition (Dybex)

The winner of the Asian Films category (live action) – Jury Prize

- Grand Prize: Shinobi: Heart Under Blade by Futaro Yamada (Kazé)

=== 2008 ===
Manga category winners

- Grand Prize: 20th Century Boys by Naoki Urasawa (Panini Manga)
- Shōnen Prize: One Piece by Eiichirō Oda (Glénat Éditions)
- Shōjo Prize: I am not an angel by Ai Yazawa (Akata/Delcourt)
- Seinen Prize: Übel Blatt by Etorouji Shiono (Ki-oon)
- Prize Moriawase: The game of cat and mouse by Setona Mizushiro (Asuka)
- Virgin Public Prize: Eyeshield 21 by Riichiro Inagaki and Yusuke Murata (Glénat Éditions)

Anime category winners

- Grand Prize: Neon Genesis Evangelion (Dybex)
- Shōnen Prize: Fullmetal Alchemist: Conqueror of Shamballa (Dybex)
- Shōjo Prize: xxxHOLiC (Kazé)
- Seinen Award: Ergo Proxy (Dybex)
- Moriawase Award: The Leaper by Mamoru Hosoda (Dybex)

Category winners Asian Films

- Best Film Award: I am a cyborg} by Park Chan-wook (Wild Side)
- Best DVD Edition Award: The Host by Bong Joon-ho (Océan Films)

Category winners J-Music

- Best Artist/Group Award: L'Arc-en-Ciel (Gan-Shin)
- Best Album Award: Olivia Inspi Reira Trapnest by Olivia Lufkin (Wasabi Records)

Video Game Category Winner

- Best Console Game Award: Devil May Cry 4 (Capcom)

ACBD Award Winner

- Grand Prize: Le Visiteur du Sud, le journal de Monsieur oh en Corée du Nord by Oh Yeong Jin (FLBLB Editions)

A special award was also given to Kazuo Koike, Takeshi Obata, and Go Nagai for their contribution to Japanese comics and animation.

=== 2009 ===
Manga Category Winners

- Best Shōnen: Fairy Tail by Hiro Mashima (Pika Edition)
- Best Shōjo: Vampire Knight by Matsuri Hino (Panini Manga)
- Best Seinen: Detroit Metal City by Kiminori Wakasugi (12 bis)
- Best Edition: Blackjack – Deluxe Edition by Osamu Tezuka (Asuka)

Anime Category Winners

- Best Adapted Manga Series: Death Note (Kana Home Video)
- Best Original Series: Elfen Lied (Kazé)
- Best Edition: Death Note – Complete Limited Edition (Kana Home Video)

Asian Film Category Winners

- Best Live Action Film: Sukiyaki Western Django by Takashi Miike (WE Production)
- Best Animated Film: La Traversée du temps by Mamoru Hosoda (Kazé)
- Best Edition: La Traversée du temps – Édition collector by Mamoru Hosoda (Kazé)

Category winners J-Music

- Best artist/group: Anna Tsuchiya (Wasabi Records)
- Best album: GIMMICAL*IMPACT!! by LM.C (Soundlicious)
- Best soundtrack: Nana Best (Wasabi Records)

Category winners Video Games

- Best Home Console Game: Metal Gear Solid 4: Guns of the Patriots on PS3 (Konami)
- Best Handheld Game: Professor Layton and the Curious Village on DS (Nintendo)

The Winner of the ACBD Award

- Grand Prize: Undercurrent by Tetsuya Toyoda (Kana)

=== 2010 ===
Category Winners Manga

- Best Shōnen Award: Black Butler by Yana Toboso (Kana)
- Best Shōjo Award: Otaku Girls by Natsumi Konjoh (Doki-doki)
- Best Seinen Award: Ikigami by Motorō Mase (Kazé)
- Best Edition Award: RG Veda – Deluxe Edition by Clamp (Tonkam)

Category Winners Anime

- Best Series Adapted from a Manga Award: Soul Eater (Kazé)
- Best Original Series Award: Code Geass (Kazé)
- Best Edition Award: Fullmetal Alchemist – Collector's Edition (Dybex)

Category Winners Asian Films

- Best Directed Film Award

=== 2011 ===
Category Winners Manga

- Best Shōnen Award: Bakuman by Takeshi Obata and Tsugumi Ohba (Kana)
- Best Shōjo Award: Maid Sama! by Hiro Fujiwara (Pika Édition)
- Best Seinen Award: Les Gouttes de Dieu by Tadashi Agi (Glénat Éditions)
- Best Edition Award: A Distant Neighborhood by Jirō Taniguchi (Casterman)

Category Winners Anime

- Award for Best Series Adapted from a Manga: Black Butler (Kana Home Video)
- Award for Best Original Series: Code Geass – Lelouch of the Rebellion R2 (Kazé)
- Award for Best Editing: Visions of Escaflowne (Dybex)

Category Winners Asian Films

- Award for Best Live Action Film: Ikigami (Kazé)
- Award for Best Animated Film: Summer Wars (Kazé)
- Best Edition Award: Professor Layton and the Eternal Diva (Kazé)

Category Winners J-Music

- Best Group/Artist Award: Aural Vampire (Bishi Bishi)
- Best Album Award: Microcosm (Wasabi Records)

Category Winners Video Games

- Best Home Console Game Award: Naruto Shippūden: Ultimate Ninja Storm 2 on Xbox 360 & PS3 (Namco Bandai Games)
- Best Handheld Game Award: Kingdom Hearts: Birth by Sleep on PSP (Square Enix)

The winner of the ACBD Award

- Grand Prize: Elmer by Gerry Alanguilan

=== 2012 ===
Category winners Manga

- Best Shōnen Award: GTO: Shonan 14 Days by Tōru Fujisawa (Pika)
- Best Shōjo Award: Dengeki Daisy by Kyōsuke Motomi (Kazé)
- Best Seinen Award: Ashita no Joe by Tetsuya Chiba and Asao Takamori (Glénat Éditions)

Category winners Anime

- Award for best series adapted from a manga: Fullmetal Alchemist: Brotherhood (Dybex)
- Award for best original series: Eden of the East (Kazé)

Category winners Video Games

- Award for best game on home console: The Legend of Zelda: Skyward Sword on Wii (Nintendo)
- Award for best game on portable console: Super Mario 3D Land on Nintendo 3DS (Nintendo)

The winner of the ACBD Award

- Grand Prize: Une Vie dans les Marges 2 by Tatsumi Yoshihiro (Cornelius)

The winner of the ATEP Award

- Grand Prize: Nonnonba by Shigeru Mizuki (Cornelius)

A special prize was also awarded to the group Flow and to Naoki Urasawa.

=== 2016 ===
Winners in the Manga category – Jury Prize

- Golden Daruma manga: Inuyashiki by Hiroya Oku (Ki-oon)
- Daruma for the best new series: Ajin by Tsuina Miura and Gamon Sakurai (Glénat Éditions)
- Daruma for heritage: This city will kill you by Yoshihiro Tatsumi (Cornélius)
- Daruma for the best international manga: Radiant by Tony Valente (Ankama)
- Daruma for best scenario: Dēmokratía by Motoro Mase (Kazé)
- Daruma for best drawing: A Bride's Story by Kaoru Mori (Ki-oon)
- Daruma for best production: Cutie Honey by Go Nagai (isan manga)

Anime category winners – Jury Prize

=== 2017 ===
The Manga category winners – Jury Prize

- Golden Daruma manga: My Hero Academia by Kōhei Horikoshi (Ki-oon)
- Daruma for best new series: One-Punch Man by Yusuke Murata and ONE (Kurokawa)
- Daruma for best scenario: Daedalus by Takamichi (Doki-Doki)
- Daruma for best drawing: Dead Dead Demon's Dededede Destruction by Inio Asano (Kana)
- Daruma for best international manga: Outlaw Players by Shonen (Ki-oon)
- Heritage Daruma: Gen of Hiroshima – Integrale by Keiji Nakazawa (Vertige Graphics)
- Daruma of the best production – Jury Prize for Creation: Takeru' by Buichi Terasawa (isan manga)

The winners category Anime – Jury Prize

- Anime Golden Daruma: Your Name by Makoto Shinkai (@Anime)
- Best Achievement Award: Your Name by Makoto Shinkai (@Anime)
- Daruma for best screenplay: Your Name by Makoto Shinkai (@Anime)
- Daruma for Best Original Soundtrack: Your Name by Makoto Shinkai, original band is Radwimps (@Anime)
- Daruma of the best edition: The Boy and the Beast by Mamoru Hosoda (Kazé)

Manga & Anime Category Winners – Audience Award

- Daruma for Best Seinen: Children of the Whale by Abi Umeda (Glénat Éditions)
- Daruma for Best Shojo: Takane & Hana by Yuki Shiwasu (Kazé)
- Daruma for Best Shounen: One-Punch Man by Yusuke Murata and ONE (Kurokawa)
- Daruma for best film and OAV: Your Name by Makoto Shinkai (@Anime)
- Daruma for best simulcast: Yuri on Ice by Sayo Yamamoto (Crunchyroll)

=== 2018 ===
Les gagnants catégorie Manga – Jury Prize

- Daruma d'or manga: A Silent Voice by Yoshitoki Ōima (Ki-oon)
- Daruma de la meilleure nouvelle série: To Your Eternity by Yoshitoki Ōima (Pika Édition)
- Award for best screenplay: Satoru Noda for Golden Kamui (Ki-oon)
- Daruma du meilleur dessin: Haruhisa Nakata for Levius Est (Kana)
- Daruma du meilleur manga international: Green Mechanic by Yami Shin (Ki-oon)
- Daruma du patrimoine: My Name Is Shingo by Kazuo Umezu (Le Lézard Noir)
- Daruma de la meilleure fabrication – Prix du creation jury: Guardians of the Louvre by Jirō Taniguchi (Futuropolis)

Les gagnants category Anime – Prix du Jury'

- Daruma d'or anime: Dans un recoin de ce monde by Sunao Katabuchi (Septième Factory)
- Award for Best Screenplay: Mitsurou Kubo and Sayo Yamamoto for Yuri on Ice (Crunchyroll)
- Daruma of the best series adapted: My Hero Academia by Kenji Nagasaki, adapted from the work of Kōhei Horikoshi (Kazé / VIZ Media)
- Daruma of the best original series: Yuri on Ice by Sayo Yamamoto (Crunchyroll)
- Daruma du meilleur film / OAV: Dans un recoin de ce monde by Sunao Katabuchi (Septième Factory)
- Daruma de la meilleure édition – Prize du creation jury: Psycho-Pass – Intégrale, édition collector limitée, by Naoyoshi Shiotani (Kana Home Video)

=== 2019 ===
Winners in the Manga category – Jury Prize

- Golden Daruma manga: Witch Hat Atelier, Kamome Shirahama (Pika Édition)
- Daruma for the best drawing: Les Montagnes hallucinées, Gou Tanabe (Ki-oon)
- Daruma for the best international manga: Lastman Stories, Bastien Vivès and Alexis BACCI LEVEILLÉ (Casterman)
- Daruma for the best new series: The Promised Neverland by Kaiu Shirai and Posuka Demizu (Kazé)
- Daruma for best production – Creation jury prize: The Mountains of Hallucinations, Gou Tanabe (Ki-oon)
- Daruma for best one shot (comics channel booksellers' prize): Memories of Emanon, Shinji Kajio and Kenji Tsuruta (Ki-oon) The winners in the Anime category – Jury Prize
- Daruma d'or anime: A Silent Voice, Naoko Yamada (Kazé)
- Daruma for best original series: B: The Beginning, Yoshiki Yamakawa and Kazuto Nakazawa (Netflix)
- Daruma for best adapted series: Cells at Work!, Kenichi Suzuki (Wakanim)
- Daruma for Best Film: Silent Voice, Naoko Yamada (Kazé)
- Daruma for Best Edition – Creation Jury Prize: Death Note – Limited Collector's Edition, Tetsurō Araki (Kana Home Video)

Winners in the Manga & Anime category – Audience Award

- Daruma for Best Seinen: Witch Hat Atelier, Kamome Shirahama (Pika Edition)
- Daruma for Best shôjo: Orange, Ichigo Takano (Éditions Akata)
- Daruma for the best shônen: Im: Great Priest Imhotep, Makoto Morishita (Ki-oon)
- Daruma for the best drama anime: A Silent Voice, Naoko Yamada (Kazé)
- Daruma for the best comedy anime: Food Wars – The Third Plate, Yoshitomo Yonetani (Crunchyroll)

=== 2022 ===
Daruma d'or

- Best manga of the year: Spy × Family, Tatsuya Endo (Kurokawa)
- Best anime of the year: Demon Slayer: Kimetsu no Yaiba: The Movie—Mugen Train / The Pleasure District (TV series), Ufotable, Haruo Sotozaki

Manga category winners

- Daruma for best action manga: Chainsaw Man, Tatsuki Fujimoto (Kazé)
- Daruma for best romance manga: Kaguya-sama – Love is War, Aka Akasaka (Pika Édition)
- Daruma for best thriller manga: Summer Time Rendering, Yasuki Tanaka (Kana)
- Daruma for best slice of life manga: ' Blue Period, Tsubasa Yamaguchi (Pika Edition)
- Daruma for best production: Fullmetal Alchemist, Hiromu Arakawa (Kurokawa)
- Daruma for best one shot: Death Note Short Stories, Tsugimi Ohba and Takeshi Obata (Kana)
- Daruma of the French Touch: Jizo, Mr.Tan & Mato (Glénat Éditions)
- Daruma of the best new manga: The Apothecary Diaries, Itsuki Nanao and Nekokurage (Ki-oon)
- Daruma of the heritage: Slam Dunk by Inoue Takehiko (Kana)
- Daruma of the best drawing: Chainsaw Man, Tatsuki Fujimoto (Kazé)
- Daruma for Best Screenplay: Chainsaw Man, Tatsuki Fujimoto (Kazé)

Anime Category Winners

- Daruma for Best Action Anime: Demon Slayer: Kimetsu no Yaiba, the Movie: Mugen Train / The Pleasure District (TV Series), Haruo Sotozaki
- Daruma for Best Romance Anime: Fruits Basket The Final Season, TMS Entertainment, Akitaru Daichi
- Daruma for Best Suspense Anime: Moriarty the Patriot Season 1, Production I.G., Kazuya Nomura
- Daruma for Best Slice of Life Anime: Komi Can't Communicate, OLM, Ayumu Watanabe, and Kazuki Kawagoe
- Daruma for Best Movie: Demon Slayer: Kimetsu no Yaiba, the Movie: Mugen Train

=== 2023 ===
The Golden Daruma

- Daruma for Best Manga: Chainsaw Man, Tatsuki Fujimoto (Crunchyroll)
- For Best Anime: Cyberpunk: Edgerunners, Studio Trigger (Netflix)

Manga category winners

- Daruma for Best Action Manga: Sakamoto Days, Yuto Suzuki
- Best Romance Manga: Kowloon Generic Romance by Jun Mayuzuki (Kana)
- Daruma for Best Suspense Manga: Fool Night by Kasumi Yasuda
- Daruma for the best slice of life manga: Look Back, Tatsuki Fujimoto (Crunchyroll)
- Daruma for the best one shot: Look Back, Tatsuki Fujimoto (Crunchyroll)
- Daruma for Best Production: Veil of Kotteri! (November Grafx)
- For the French Touch: Space Punch, ZD. (Ankama)
- Heritage Daruma: City Hunter, Tsukasa Hōjō (Panini)
- New Manga Daruma: Call of the Night, Kotoyama (Kurokawa)
- Best Drawing: Kotteri's Veil!
- Best Screenplay: Heavenly Delusion by Masakazu Ishiguro (Pika)

Anime Category Winners

- Best Action Anime Title: Cyberpunk: Edgerunners, Studio Trigger (Netflix)
- Daruma for Best Romance Anime: Kaguya-sama: Love is War -Ultra Romantic-, A-1 Pictures ( Crunchyroll)
- For Best Thriller Anime: Summer Time Rendering, OLM (Disney+)
- Daruma for Best Slice of Life Anime: Spy × Family CloverWorks, Wit Studio (Crunchyroll)
- Daruma for Best Original Soundtrack: CloverWorks
- Daruma for Best Opening: Chainsaw Man – Kick Back Kenshi Yonezu (Crunchyroll
- Daruma for Best Ending: Attack on Titan Final Season Part 2 – Akuma no Ko, Higuchi Ai (Crunchyroll)
- Nomination for Best Feature Film: Jujutsu Kaisen 0, Sunghoo Park, MAPPA (Crunchyroll)
- Daruma for Best Original Creation: Sunrise (Crunchyroll)
- Nomination for Best Direction: Cyberpunk: Edgerunners, Studio Trigger (Netflix)
