= Cö Shu Nie =

Japanese rock band

Cö shu Nie
- Also known as: コシュニエ
- Origin: Osaka, Japan
- Genres: Alternative rock; math rock; pop rock; electronic
- Years active: 2011–present
- Label: Sony Music Associated Records (2018–2025) RVRNC (2025–present)
- Members: Miku Nakamura; Shunsuke Matsumoto
- Past members: Kojiro Yamazaki; Ryosuke Fujita
- Website: coshunie.com

Cö shu Nie (Japanese: コシュニエ, Hepburn: Ko Shu Nie) is a Japanese rock band formed in Osaka, Japan, in 2011. The group consists of Miku Nakamura (guitar, keyboards, vocals) and Shunsuke Matsumoto (bass); previously in the band were Kōjirō Yamazaki (drums) and Ryōsuke Fujita (drums).

Cö shu Nie formed in 2011, and, in their early years, independently released four mini albums. In 2018, Yamazaki was replaced by Fujita as the group signed with Sony Music Japan. Their debut album, Pure, (2019), peaked in the top 40 on the Oricon and Billboard Japan charts and was praised by music critics for its unconventional structure and sound. After Fujita left the band in 2021, their second and third albums, Flos Ex Machina (2022) and 7 Deadly Guilt (2024) were released to similar success.

In 2025 Cö Shu Nie left Sony and Miku Nakamura together with the solo artist Kaz Skellington founded their own independent record label called RVRNC (derived from the english word "Reverence").

== History ==
=== 2011–2017: Early years ===
Cö shu Nie was formed in 2011, the initial lineup being Miku Nakamura, Shunsuke Matsumoto and Kōjirō Yamazaki. Nakamura is the group's primarily vocalist, keyboardist and manipulator, while she and Matsumoto both perform on guitar. Yamazaki primarily performed on drums. Their early work consisted of producing and writing independently, debuting with the single "Maze" which was released that same year. The band released the mini albums Hydra and Org in December 2013, done through two separate labels (Silver Star Records and Vibrateshow Records, respectively).

Cö shu Nie would continue to work on small-scale projects, generally switching between Silver Star Records and Vibrateshow Records before they self-released their fourth mini-album, Overkill in 2017. That same year, it was announced Kōjirō Yamazaki would depart from the group.

=== 2018–2021: Pure ===
Following a period of independent releases, Cö shu Nie would achieve their major breakthrough in 2018, following both their signing to the Sony Music Entertainment Japan label and the addition of member Ryōsuke Fujita, who performed on drums. Cö shu Nie released their debut extended play Aurora, which was their first work to achieve significant commercial success, making it onto the charts of Oricon and Billboard Japan. Following Aurora, the single "Asphyxia" was released, used as the first theme song for the anime series Tokyo Ghoul:re, which similarly earned positions on the Oricon charts and acclaim upon release.

In 2019, Cö shu Nie announced that their debut album would be released, revealing itself to be titled Pure and featuring their previous single "Asphyxia". The album peaked at number 29 and 27 on the Oricon and Billboard Japan charts respectively, particularly due to the international reach with the singles "Zettai Zetsumei", used as the ending theme song of The Promised Neverland's first season, and "Bullet", included as the ending theme for Psycho-Pass 3. Pure was acclaimed by critics and audiences, who highlighted how its "sense of unpredictability goes a long way to making Pure an exhilarating listen."

Cö shu Nie announced their self-titled Japan Tour, which sold-out tickets and was set for dates in 2020, however it was cancelled due to the COVID-19 pandemic. They began 2020 with the single "Flare", curated to inspire fans who were in quarantine resulted by the spread of Coronavirus. Their extended play, Litmus, was released thereafter to critical and commercial success, and includes "Flare" in addition.

In 2021, they performed the song "Give It Back" for Jujutsu Kaisen, which finished 14th on the Oricon Charts. That same year, Fujita announced his exit from the band. Billboard Japan announced that the drama series Women's War: Bachelor Murder Case will feature the band's single, "undress me", which marks their first live action feature, and was released in 2021.

=== 2022–present: Flos Ex Machina and 7 Deadly Guilt ===
In 2022, Cö shu Nie performed the song "Sakura Burst" for Code Geass: Lelouch of the Rebellion, and also wrote the Eir Aoi single "Phoenix Prayer" which was featured in the anime. Also in 2022, they released their second studio album Flos Ex Machina, which finished 54th on the Oricon Charts and 44th on Billboard Japan's Charts. The album features "Sakura Burst", as well as their previous hit songs "Red Strand", "Give It Back" and "undress me". The single "Yume wo Misete" was released in 2022.

In 2024, Cö shu Nie performed their first solo concert in China. That same year, they announced a third studio album, later revealed to be titled 7 Deadly Guilt, which was released on September 11, 2024. No singles were released to promote the record. The album peaked at 43 on Oricon, but was the first of their albums to not appear on Billboard Japan.

== Musical style and influences ==
Early in their career, Cö shu Nie's initial focus was "concentrating only on expressing small thoughts from our minds, like spreading spores from our own world that we created in our hearts." The group is recognized for their unique themes and frequent changes in aesthetic style; guitarist Matsumoto credited this primarily to Nakamura, stating that "The theme for each song is always completed in Director (Nakamura)'s mind beforehand. At the point in which we listen to the finished song, all of the members have shared her vision, and can conceptually understand what she’s trying to express, like "Oh, this is what you mean." However, her vision is never constant, and changes each time depending on her mood. Even I don’t know what will come next."

On their inspirations, Nakamura said that "Everything in life is an inspiration. Like how I'm talking with you right now, or what I eat, there are things that you can feel but can't verbally express, right? Those things keep getting stacked within me, and suddenly become music." Matsumoto later affirmed this by describing how "she would hit metal objects and record them for songs. Even now, when we go into the woods, she'd be recording sounds on his phone, and later show me the songs she'd made from them. So it really is true that everything in the world is an influence for her."

== Band members ==
Current members

- Miku Nakamura (中村未来) — vocals, guitar, keyboards, manipulator (2011–present)
- Shunsuke Matsumoto (松本駿介) — bass guitar (2011–present)

Former members

- Kōjirō Yamazaki (ヤマザキコウジロウ) — drums (2011–2017)
- Ryōsuke Fujita (藤田亮介) — drums (2018–2021)

== Discography ==
=== Albums ===
List of studio albums, with selected chart positions
Title	Album details	Peak chart positions	
Title	Album details	JPN Oricon	JPN Billboard
Pure	Released: December 11, 2019; Label: Sony Music Associated; Formats: CD, digital download	29	27
Flos Ex Machina	Released: March 3, 2022; Label: Sony Music Associated; Formats: CD, digital download	54	44
7 Deadly Guilt	Released: September 11, 2024; Label: Sony Music Associated; Formats: CD, digital download	43	—

=== Mini albums ===
List of mini albums
Title	Album details
Hydra (イドラ Idora)	Released: December 18, 2013; Label: Silver Star; Format: CD
Org (オルグ Orugu)	Released: December 18, 2013; Label: Vibrateshow; Format: CD
Puzzle (パズル Pazuru)	Released: April 20, 2016; Label: Silver Star; Format: CD
Overkill (Venue release)	Released: July 21, 2017; Label: Self-released; Format: CD

=== Extended plays ===
List of extended plays, with selected chart positions
Title	EP details	Peak chart positions	
Title	EP details	JPN Oricon	JPN Billboard
Aurora	Released: October 24, 2018; Label: Sony Music Associated; Formats: CD, digital download	76	67
Litmus	Released: November 11, 2020; Label: Sony Music Associated; Formats: CD, digital download	56	46

=== Singles ===
List of singles, with selected chart positions
Title	Year	Peak positions	Notes	Album
Title	Year	JPN Oricon	Notes	Album
"Maze" (迷路; "Meiro")	2011	—	Self-released single.	Non-album single
"Asphyxia"	2018	32	OP for the anime Tokyo Ghoul:re Season 1.	Pure
"Desperately / Lamp" (絶体絶命 / Lamp; "Zettai Zetsumei / Lamp")	2019	37	EDs for the anime The Promised Neverland Season 1.	Pure
"Bullet"	2019	43	ED for the anime Psycho-Pass Season 3.	Pure
"Red Strand"	2020	—	ED for the anime movie trilogies Psycho-Pass 3: First Inspector.	Flos Ex Machina
"Give It Back"	2021	14	ED for the anime Jujutsu Kaisen.	Flos Ex Machina
"Undress Me"	2021	—	Theme song for the Japanese TV Drama Women's War – Bachelor Murder Case -.	Flos Ex Machina
"Sakura Burst"	2022	61	ED 2 for the 15th anniversary broadcast of Code Geass: Lelouch of the Rebellion in Japan.	Flos Ex Machina
"Yume wo Misete" (夢をみせて)	2022	—	Digital singles.	7 Deadly Guilt
"no future"	2023	—	Digital singles.	7 Deadly Guilt
"Burn The Fire"	2023	—	Digital singles.	7 Deadly Guilt
"Artificial Vampire"	2024	—	Digital singles.	7 Deadly Guilt
"Maisie feat. Hyde"	2025	37	OP for the anime Black Butler: Emerald Witch Arc.	Non-album singles
"Won't Leave You Behind"	2025	—	Theme song for the 10th anniversary of the game Bleach: Brave Souls.	Non-album singles
"I am the light"	2025	—	Digital singles.	Non-album singles
"Hollow"	2026	—	Digital singles.	Non-album singles
"One More Wish"	2026	—	Theme song for the game Wuthering Waves.	Non-album singles
"—" denotes items which did not chart.
