= Posuka Demizu =

Japanese manga artist

- 出水 ぽすか
- Born: 17 January 1988 (age 38); Tokyo, Japan
- Occupations: Manga artist; Illustrator; Designer
- Writing career
- Years active: 2008–present
- Genres: Manga; Anime; Video games
- Notable works: The Promised Neverland; Beyblade X

Posuka Demizu (Japanese: 出水 ぽすか, Hepburn: Demizu Posuka; born 17 January 1988) is a Japanese manga artist, illustrator and designer. She is particularly known for having drawn The Promised Neverland manga series.

She debuted as a manga artist with the 2013 CoroCoro Comic series Oreca Monsters Adventure Retsuden. A collection of illustrations, The Art of Posuka Demizu Pone and Postcard Planet, were released in 2016 and 2021 by PIE International.

== Biography ==
Posuka Demizu was born on 17 January 1988, and lives in Tokyo, Japan. She emerged on the manga scene in 2008 with a mini-series for the monthly manga magazine CoroCoro Comic. She has worked on a wide range of projects with children's magazines and video game companies. Notably, she has worked with the animation studio J.C.Staff on the series The Pet Girl of Sakurasou and illustrated a manga series titled Oreca Monsters Adventure Retsuden on the CoroCoro Comic magazine based on the popular card game Oreca Battle. She has also published several works on the artists' website Pixiv.

Beginning in 2016, Demizu collaborated with author Kaiu Shirai on The Promised Neverland. The series began in Weekly Shōnen Jump's 35th issue on 1 August 2016, published by Shueisha, and ended in the magazine's 28th issue on 15 June 2020. It followed Emma and her siblings who try to escape the orphanage they grew up in after they find out the unsettling truth behind it. Originally, Shirai planned to write and draw, but his editor felt like Shirai's style 'didn't do the script justice' and that it would be too hard for Shirai to keep up the quality of both. As a result of this, Demizu joined the project. Shirai had seen Demizu's art before and enjoyed it, but before starting the series they created a one-shot called Poppy's Wish. The outcome was better than Shirai originally imagined. On 3 September 2021, Kaiu Shirai x Posuka Demizu: Beyond The Promised Neverland was published in Japan, which included works in combination between the two artists.

A collaborative exhibition「MIROIRS – Manga meets CHANEL」 by Posuka Demizu, Kaiu Shirai and Chanel was held at Chanel Nexus Hall Ginza, Chūō, Tokyo, from 28 April to 4 June 2021. The manga Miroirs, written and illustrated by the duo, was inspired by the Chanel brand and was published by Shueisha on 30 April 2021. In this exhibition, scenes from Miroirs are exhibited alongside precious works from Chanel.

In 2022, Posuka Demizu worked on the character design of the tactical hero summoning RPG mobile game, titled, unVEIL the world. The game will be released for iOS and Android and is produced by Shueisha Games and NetEase Games. In November 2022, it was announced that Posuka Demizu handled the character design and the concept art of the Dragons of Wonderhatch series on Disney+.

In May 2023, it was announced that Demizu would collaborate with Homura Kawamoto and Hikaru Muno to illustrate the manga adaptation of Takara Tomy's Beyblade X project. The manga started its serialization in Shogakukan's Monthly CoroCoro Comic manga magazine on 15 June 2023. In December 2023, It was announced that Demizu designed the monsters for Konami's digital card game, titled, Ore'n. The game will debut for iOS, Android, PC, and browsers in 2024.

== Influences ==
Posuka Demizu commented that she was influenced by many illustrators and manga artists including, Yasushi Nirasawa, Naohisa Inoue, Yutaka Ohno, Takayuki Sakai; and Makoto Hijioka with Kotone Yumiya for manga artists. She also stated that her next titles will have gotten the most influence from Kaiu Shirai.

She also mentioned Final Fantasy series and Oreca Battle as a source of influences for her art and own signature style.

== Works ==
=== Manga ===
Title	Year	Notes	Refs
The Promised Neverland	2016–2020	Serialized in Weekly Shōnen Jump by Shueisha, collected into 20 volumes.	
Miroirs	2021	Collected into a single volume by Shueisha.	
Beyblade X	2023–present	Serialized in Monthly CoroCoro Comic by Shogakukan.	

=== One-shots ===
Title	Year	Notes	Refs
Poppy's Wish	2016	Published in Shōnen Jump+ by Shueisha, collected into a single volume.	
Spirit Photographer Saburo Kono	2020	Published in Weekly Shōnen Jump by Shueisha, collected into a single volume.	
Dreams Come True	2020	Spin-off of The Promised Neverland, published in the art exhibition of the series at the Mori Art Museum in Roppongi from December 2020, to January 2021, by Shueisha. It was collected into a single volume.	
We Were Born	2021	Published in Weekly Shōnen Jump by Shueisha, collected into a single volume.	
DC3	2021	Published in Weekly Shōnen Jump by Shueisha, collected into a single volume.	
Kaiu Shirai x Posuka Demizu: Beyond The Promised Neverland	2021	Collected volume of Demizu's one-shots with Kaiu Shirai, published by Shueisha.	
Cool Shock Old B.T.	2021	Published in Ultra Jump by Shueisha.	
Chicken Survivor	2022	Published in Shōnen Jump+ by Shueisha.	
Naka no Hito	2022	Published in Jump GIGA Magazine by Shueisha.	

=== Light novels ===
Title	Year	Notes	Refs
Kirugumi	2013–2014	Illustration artist, published by Shogakukan.	
Real Cedro Investigation File Shibuya Hen Chase down the fugitive!	2022	Illustration artist, published by Shogakukan.	
Almark	2022	Illustration artist, published by Media Factory.	

=== Art books ===
Title	Year	Notes	Refs
The Art of Posuka Demizu – Pone	2016	Published by PIE International.	
The Promised Neverland: Art Book World	2020	Published by Shueisha.	
The Art of Posuka Demizu – Postcard Planet	2021	Published by PIE International.	

=== Other works ===
- Character designer and concept artist for Dragons of Wonderhatch.
- Character designer for the smartphone game unVEIL the world.
- Character designer for the digital card game Ore'n.
- Illustrator for the Japanese poster of Dune.
- Cover illustration for the women's fashion magazine Spur.
- Participated in animation production of The Pet Girl of Sakurasou (design).
- Illustrator for the Pokémon, Wixoss, Duel Masters Trading Card Games.
- Illustrator for the manga version of Animal Kaiser Evolution, Great Animal Kaiser, and Strong Animal Kaiser Evolution.
- Mobile Suit Gundam: The Witch from Mercury (機動戦士ガンダム 水星の魔女, Kidō Senshi Gandamu: Suisei no Majo) (2022) – End card (episode 7).
- Illustrator for the music video of "Bansanka" by Tuki.
- Original character design for LONA.

== Awards and nominations ==
Year	Award	Category	Nominee	Result	Ref.
2012	Glico Pocky	Excellence Award	Posuka Demizu	Won	
2016	Mandō Kobayashi Manga Award	New Serialization Award	The Promised Neverland	Won	
2017	Mandō Kobayashi Manga Award	Manga Grand Prix	The Promised Neverland	Won	
2017	1st Annual Tsutaya Comic Award	Next Break Division	The Promised Neverland	Won	
2017	Manga Shimbun Taishō	Grand Prix	The Promised Neverland	Won	
2017	10th Manga Taishō	Manga Taishō	The Promised Neverland	Nominated	
2017	3rd Next Manga Awards	Comics Division	The Promised Neverland	2nd place	
2018	63rd Shogakukan Manga Award	Best Shōnen Manga	The Promised Neverland	Won	
2018	22nd Tezuka Osamu Cultural Prize	Cultural Prize	The Promised Neverland	Nominated	
2018	11th Manga Taishō	Manga Taishō	The Promised Neverland	Nominated	
2018	24th Salón del Manga de Barcelona	Best Shōnen Manga	The Promised Neverland	Nominated	
2018	2nd Annual Tsutaya Comic Award	All-Time Best	The Promised Neverland	3rd place	
2018	21st Japan Media Arts Festival	Manga Division	The Promised Neverland	Jury Selections	
2018	French 12th ACBD's Prix Asie de la Critique 2018	Manga Category	The Promised Neverland	Jury Selections	
2018	Kono Manga ga Sugoi!	Male Readers	The Promised Neverland	Won	
2018	Manga News Awards	Shōnen Tournament 2018	The Promised Neverland	Won	
2018	2018 Google Play Awards	User Voting Excellence Award	The Promised Neverland	Won	
2018	Ridibooks Comic Award	Next Trending Manga Award	The Promised Neverland	Won	
2019	French Babelio Readers' Awards	Best Manga Series	The Promised Neverland	Won	
2019	2019 Mangawa Awards	Best Shōnen Manga	The Promised Neverland	Won	
2019	French Manga Prix	Best Manga Series	The Promised Neverland	Won	
2019	23rd Tezuka Osamu Cultural Prize	Cultural Prize	The Promised Neverland	Nominated	
2019	Geeks d'Ouro	Best Manga Series	The Promised Neverland	Nominated	
2019	French Konishi Prize	Best Translated Manga	The Promised Neverland	Nominated	
2019	Ridibooks Comic Award	Grand Prize	The Promised Neverland	Won	
2019	Piccoma Award	Luna Prize	The Promised Neverland	Won	
2019	Japan Expo Awards	Daruma for Best New Series	The Promised Neverland	Won	
2019	Japan Expo Awards	Daruma for Best Screenplay of the Year	The Promised Neverland	Won	
2019	25th Salón del Manga de Barcelona	Best Shōnen Manga	The Promised Neverland	Won	
2020	Lucca Comics & Games	Amazon Comics Award	The Promised Neverland	Won	
2020	French "Les Mordus du Manga" Awards	Grand Prize	The Promised Neverland	Won	
2020	Anime Click Award	Best New Manga	The Promised Neverland	Won	
2020	Anime Click Award	Most Wanted Manga	The Promised Neverland	Won	
2020	20th Sense of Gender Awards	Grand Prize	The Promised Neverland	Won	
2020	3rd Saito Takao Award	Grand Prize	The Promised Neverland	Nominated	
2021	Geeks d'Ouro	Best Translated Manga	The Promised Neverland	Nominated	
2021	25th Tezuka Osamu Cultural Prize	Cultural Prize	The Promised Neverland	Nominated	
2021	52nd Seiun Awards	Best Comic	The Promised Neverland	Nominated	
