= Kaiu Shirai =

Japanese manga writer

- 白井カイウ (Shirai Kaiu)
- Born: Gifu, Japan
- Occupations: Author; artist
- Writing career
- Years active: 2015–present
- Genre: Manga

Kaiu Shirai (白井 カイウ, Shirai Kaiu) is the pen name of a Japanese manga artist and writer whose real name and date of birth are unknown. He is best known for his manga series The Promised Neverland.

== Early life ==
Kaiu Shirai was doing Kabuki at a young age and then after graduating from university, Shirai gained employment at a normal company, but later resigned. Aiming to become a professional manga artist, he began to submit manuscripts to editors and magazines.

== Career history ==
On 21 June 2015, Kaiu Shirai published his first professional work, a standalone piece called, The Location of Ashley-Gate, in Shōnen Jump+, a digital imprint of Shueisha, with art by Kyousuke Maruyama. Again, in the same magazine, he published his second work, another standalone piece called, Poppy's Wish, in collaboration with artist Posuka Demizu on 18 February 2016.

After that, Shirai created a serialized work based on drafts written while he was still an amateur. This work, The Promised Neverland, (with art by Posuka Demizu) started its run in the 35th issue of Weekly Shōnen Jump on 1 August 2016 and finished in the 28th issue of the magazine on 15 June 2020. Along with manga artist Posuka Demizu, Shirai published two one-shots in 2020 and 2021. The first one, Spirit Photographer Saburo Kono was published in the combined issue No. 36 – No. 37, 2020 of Weekly Shōnen Jump; the second one is titled DC3, published in the same magazine in issue No. 35 of 2021. On 3 September 2021, Kaiu Shirai x Posuka Demizu: Beyond The Promised Neverland was published, which included works and one-shots in combination with Posuka Demizu.

A collaborative exhibition titled Miroirs manga meets Chanel by Kaiu Shirai, Posuka Demizu and Chanel was held at Chanel Nexus Hall Ginza, Chūō, Tokyo, from 28 April to 4 June 2021. The manga Miroirs, written and illustrated by the duo, was inspired by the Chanel brand. In this exhibition, scenes from Miroirs are exhibited alongside precious works from Chanel. The manga was published by Shueisha on 30 April 2021. In 2022, Shirai participated as a judge at Shōnen Jump+'s 7th Stokin Pro Garyokin 2022, to discover new talented manga artists.

On 6 January 2024, Kaiu Shirai along with illustrator Shiki Hamada launched a standalone one-shot, titled Kubigeshō, in the combined Issue #6–#7 2024 of Weekly Shōnen Jump. Within the same year, on 9 December, Kaiu Shirai along with illustrator Yōichi Amano launched a standalone one-shot, titled Apple, in Issue #2 2025 of Weekly Shōnen Jump.

== Influences ==
Kaiu Shirai commented that he was influenced by manga artists Osamu Tezuka, Naoki Urasawa, Yoshihiro Togashi and Eiichiro Oda; as well as directors Akira Kurosawa, Kōki Mitani, Kentaro Kobayashi and Hayao Miyazaki. He has also mentioned the Kabuki actor Kanzaburo Nakamura XVIII as a source of influence for his works.

== Works ==
=== Manga ===
- The Promised Neverland (約束のネバーランド, Yakusoku no Nebārando) (art by Posuka Demizu, serialized in Weekly Shōnen Jump, 2016–2020).
- Miroirs (art by Posuka Demizu, 2021).

=== One-shots ===
- The Location of Ashley-Gate (art by Kyousuke Maruyama, Shōnen Jump+, 2015).
- Kaiu Shirai x Posuka Demizu: Beyond The Promised Neverland (白井カイウ×出水ぽすか短編集, Shirai kaiu × Demizu posuka Tanhenshū) (2021) — Collected volume of Shirai's one-shots published by Shueisha.
  - Poppy's Wish (art by Posuka Demizu, Shōnen Jump+, 2016).
  - Spirit Photographer Saburo Kono (art by Posuka Demizu, Weekly Shōnen Jump, Issue No. 36, 2020–Issue No. 37, 2020).
  - Dreams Come True (art by Posuka Demizu).
  - We Were Born (art by Posuka Demizu, Weekly Shōnen Jump, Issue #5–#6, 2021).
  - DC3 (art by Posuka Demizu, Weekly Shōnen Jump, Issue No. 35, 2021).
- Kubigeshō (art by Shiki Hamada, Weekly Shōnen Jump, Issue #6–#7, 2024).
- APPLE (art by Yōichi Amano, Weekly Shōnen Jump, Issue #2, 2025).

== Awards and nominations ==
Year	Award	Category	Nominee	Result	Ref.
2016	Mandō Kobayashi Manga Award	New Serialization Award	The Promised Neverland	Won	
2017	Mandō Kobayashi Manga Award	Manga Grand Prix	The Promised Neverland	Won	
2017	1st Annual Tsutaya Comic Award	Next Break Division	The Promised Neverland	Won	
2017	Manga Shimbun Taishō	Grand Prix	The Promised Neverland	Won	
2017	10th Manga Taishō	Manga Taishō	The Promised Neverland	Nominated	
2017	3rd Next Manga Awards	Comics Division	The Promised Neverland	2nd place	
2018	63rd Shogakukan Manga Award	Best Shōnen Manga	The Promised Neverland	Won	
2018	22nd Tezuka Osamu Cultural Prize	Cultural Prize	The Promised Neverland	Nominated	
2018	11th Manga Taishō	Manga Taishō	The Promised Neverland	Nominated	
2018	24th Salón del Manga de Barcelona	Best Shōnen Manga	The Promised Neverland	Nominated	
2018	2nd Annual Tsutaya Comic Award	All-Time Best	The Promised Neverland	3rd place	
2018	21st Japan Media Arts Festival	Manga Division	The Promised Neverland	Jury Selections	
2018	French 12th ACBD's Prix Asie de la Critique 2018	Manga Category	The Promised Neverland	Jury Selections	
2018	Kono Manga ga Sugoi!	Male Readers	The Promised Neverland	Won	
2018	Manga News Awards	Shōnen Tournament 2018	The Promised Neverland	Won	
2018	2018 Google Play Awards	User Voting Excellence Award	The Promised Neverland	Won	
2018	Ridibooks Comic Award	Next Trending Manga Award	The Promised Neverland	Won	
2019	French Babelio Readers' Awards	Best Manga Series	The Promised Neverland	Won	
2019	2019 Mangawa Awards	Best Shōnen Manga	The Promised Neverland	Won	
2019	French Manga Prix	Best Manga Series	The Promised Neverland	Won	
2019	23rd Tezuka Osamu Cultural Prize	Cultural Prize	The Promised Neverland	Nominated	
2019	Geeks d'Ouro	Best Manga Series	The Promised Neverland	Nominated	
2019	French Konishi Prize	Best Translated Manga	The Promised Neverland	Nominated	
2019	Ridibooks Comic Award	Grand Prize	The Promised Neverland	Won	
2019	Piccoma Award	Luna Prize	The Promised Neverland	Won	
2019	Japan Expo Awards	Daruma for Best New Series	The Promised Neverland	Won	
2019	Japan Expo Awards	Daruma for Best Screenplay of the Year	The Promised Neverland	Won	
2019	25th Salón del Manga de Barcelona	Best Shōnen Manga	The Promised Neverland	Won	
2020	Lucca Comics & Games	Amazon Comics Award	The Promised Neverland	Won	
2020	French "Les Mordus du Manga" Awards	Grand Prize	The Promised Neverland	Won	
2020	Anime Click Award	Best New Manga	The Promised Neverland	Won	
2020	Anime Click Award	Most Wanted Manga	The Promised Neverland	Won	
2020	20th Sense of Gender Awards	Grand Prize	The Promised Neverland	Won	
2020	3rd Saito Takao Award	Grand Prize	The Promised Neverland	Nominated	
2021	Geeks d'Ouro	Best Translated Manga	The Promised Neverland	Nominated	
2021	25th Tezuka Osamu Cultural Prize	Cultural Prize	The Promised Neverland	Nominated	
2021	52nd Seiun Awards	Best Comic	The Promised Neverland	Nominated	

== See also ==
- Kaiu Shirai x Posuka Demizu: Beyond The Promised Neverland
