= Garo: Divine Flame =

- Theatrical release poster
- Directed by: Yuichiro Hayashi
- Written by: Yasuko Kobayashi
- Based on: Garo: The Animation by MAPPA
- Produced by: Takahiro Suzuki
- Starring: Daisuke Namikawa; Kenyuu Horiuchi; Romi Park; Masato Hagiwara
- Cinematography: Yūsuke Tannawa
- Edited by: Kiyoshi Hirose
- Music by: Monaca
- Backgrounds by: Tadashi Kudo
- Color process: Chikako Kamada
- Production company: MAPPA
- Distributed by: Tohokushinsha Film
- Release date: May 21, 2016
- Running time: 78 minutes
- Country: Japan
- Language: Japanese

Garo: Divine Flame is a 2016 Japanese animated superhero film based on Garo: The Animation. The movie takes place four years after the events of the first season, Garo: The Carved Seal of Flames. It follows the adventures of León, Alfonso, Ema and Germán as they try to stop a powerful Horror who plans to use Germán's son Roberto as a sacrifice.

== Plot ==
A Horror which looks like a beautiful woman murders a couple after they have sex in some old ruins. Meanwhile, León has inherited the mantle of Garo the Golden Knight and protects the capital of Valiante Kingdom from Horrors. León devotes himself to training Roberto, the son of Germán Luis and Ximena, with the assistance of Prince Alfonso.

Garm orders them to exterminate the Dead Tower Horror, after Nigra Venus before she can activate the mystic tool created by Mendoza, Zirkel's Ring. She is reputedly the most beautiful Horror in the world which resides in a neighboring country Vazelia where the assigned Makai Knight has been missing for generations.

In the capital, strange masked beings abduct Roberto, and when León is almost defeated chasing them, Dario Monyoya, the Obsidian Makai Knight Zem, appears and saves him. Meanwhile Garm re-materializes Germán Luis temporarily and together, they pursue the abductors, but Germán realizes that Dario is the missing Knight and he is serving another master. Dario reveals that after Princess Sara was disfigured by a Horror, he blinded himself and continued to serve her, even after she became the Horror, Nigra Venus.

Meanwhile, Ema finds Alphonse and together they also search for Zirkel's Ring and arrive at a lake where Roberto is being transported to be used as a key to activate Zirkel's Ring. Together with Germán and León, they attack Nigra Venus, but without success and retreat. Later, they counterattack, Ema and León fighting Nigra Venus while Germán and Alphonse challenge Dario. After a titanic battle, Nigra Venus is defeated, taking Dario into the depths of the lake with her. Roberto is rescued and learns that Germán is his father. Nigra Venus re-emerges, combined with Dario and make one last assault, but is finally destroyed by Garo, the Golden Knight, enhanced by the power of Jiruba.

== Cast ==
Character	Japanese	English
León Luis	Daisuke Namikawa	Ricco Fajardo
Germán Luis	Kenyuu Horiuchi	David Wald
Dario Montoya	Masato Hagiwara	Omar Padilla
Ema Guzmán	Romi Park	Monica Rial
Alfonso San Valiante	Katsuhito Nomura	Justin Briner
Roberto Luis	Miyu Tomita	Erica Mendez
Ximena Luis	Yumi Sudō	Jad Saxton
Sara / Venus	Arisa Komiya	Cristina Vee
Zaruba	Hironobu Kageyama	Barry Yandell
Jiruba	Aya Endō	Jennifer Seman
Garm	Mayu Udono	Tia Ballard
Lara	Madoka Aiba	Brina Palencia
Fernand San Variante	Kōsuke Gotō	Ben Phillips
Christina	Ayaka Ōhashi	Jeannie Tirado
González	Juku Ikkyu	N/A
Mario	Tomokazu Seki	Oscar Contreras
Rita	Ayumi Fujimura	Gloria Benavides

== Production ==
On November 23, 2015, it was announced that a Garo film was commissioned as part of Garo's 10th Anniversary year project. The opening theme is "Yaiba ~the divine blade~" (刃～the divine blade～; "Blade ~the divine blade~") by JAM Project while the ending theme is "Howlite" by Sayaka Sasaki.
