= List of Garo: The Animation characters =

This is a list of the characters from the anime series Garo: The Animation.

== Zaruba ==
Voiced by: Hironobu Kageyama (Japanese); Barry Yandell (English)
Zaruba (ザルバ), is a Madō Ring (魔導輪, Madōrin), a Madō Tool (魔導具, Madōgu) containing a Horror that holds no enmity against humanity, who has served the bearers of the Garo title for generations, giving advice, detecting Horrors, and devising combat strategies. Forging a pact with the holder of the Garo title, Zaruba takes a day of life from the contract holder once a month during every new moon. This places the Knight in a deep sleep for that day when his consciousness is brought to a realm outside of time, giving rise to the notion of the Golden Knight would disappear during the new moon.
In Honō no Kokuin, Zaruba previously belonged to León's grandfather, who passed him down to Anna. At some point in the past, Zaruba was broken, releasing the spirit sealed within. Germán gave Zaruba to a Makai Alchemist (魔戒法師, Makai Hōshi) named Gael to repair sixteen years before the present day, as Zaruba would be necessary for León's proper growth into the Golden Knight. The repairs were extremely time-consuming, evidenced by Gael only just finishing repairs when the Luises arrive to retrieve Zaruba in the present day. Zaruba shows the ability to suppress León's flames in his armored form, allowing him to fight without going berserk. Zaruba's ring form is notably gagged with a small piece resembling a gag bit, meaning his only means of sporadic communication with León is through his spiritual realm where Zaruba's face hangs in the sky like a large moon. Zaruba is overwhelmed by the immense flames produced by León's Lost Soul Beast form, breaking his gag and thereby his suppressing seal. Germán confiscates Zaruba from León after the battle with Mendoza. Zaruba later ends up in Alfonso's possession, continuing his role as the Golden Knight's advisor and partner. Zaruba is later returned to León, considering him finally worthy of the title of the Golden Knight.
In Guren no Tsuki, Zaruba is in the possession of Raikou, seemingly the key to summoning the Garo armor. He has been in the possession of Minamoto clan during the Heian Period before he was briefly in the Valiante Kingdom (ヴァリアンテ国, Variante-koku). He is under the effects of a magical seal Seimei placed on him and is usually in a petrified state, only becoming active when she releases the seal and allows Raikou to summon the Garo armor. After Raikou permanently breaks the seal, Zaruba remains active, albeit with dulled Horror-detecting senses.
In Vanishing Line, Zaruba is used as the "key" to Sword's Madō Motorcycle (魔導二輪, Madō Nirin), an oversized chopper that transforms when Sword dons his armor. The motorcycle features a sheath for Sword's blade and has retractable teeth that cover the tires. Zaruba is able to direct the motorcycle remotely, regardless of whether or not he is actually plugged into the vehicle. Zaruba often complains about Sword's hard-headed and womanizing nature and is quick to interject a snarky comment whenever someone admonishes Sword. He also seems to dislike Sophie, deeming her to be an annoying burden to Sword and his mission and refusing to speak with her. However, after the incident in Sun Dell Diós (サン・デル・ディオス, San Deru Diosu), Zaruba compliments Sophie for her usefulness. During Bishop's siege to capture Sophie, Zaruba sacrifices himself to intercept Knight in a huge magical explosion. Zaruba's remnants are absorbed by Sword and reinforce the Garo armor even further. Later, Zaruba is revived as a new custom motorcycle presumably by Gina in Land of Guidance (導きの地, Michibiki no Chi) and helps Sword and Sophie in El Dorado (エルドラド, Eru Dorado). When Sword dons the Garo armor, the Madō Motorcycle evolves and gains golden armor that is reminiscent like that of a dragon. Beside the retractable arms, it gains the ability to envelop Garo and itself with golden Madō Fire (魔導火, Madōbi). Furthermore, when Sword rides the transformed motorcycle, the Garouken (牙狼剣, Garōken; Fanged Wolf Sword) sword evolves into a great sword. It's unknown what happened to Zaruba after Eldo Net disappeared.

== The Carved Seal of Flames ==
=== Main characters ===
León Luis (レオン・ルイス, Reon Ruisu)
Voiced by: Daisuke Namikawa (Japanese); Ricco Fajardo (English)
Seventeen-year-old León Luis is the holder of the title of Garo the Golden Knight (黄金騎士・牙狼（ガロ）, Ōgon Kishi Garo). (Note: The kanji that make up the name "Garo" (牙狼) are literally translated as "Fanged Wolf".) León is the son of the Makai Knight (魔戒騎士, Makai Kishi) Germán Luis and the Makai Alchemist Anna, born as his mother was burning at the stake for witchcraft. Though saved by his father, who took him out of Valiante, León is haunted by visions of Anna's death and grew into a bitter and emotionally deadpan young man. León is quick to anger, highly distrustful of others, and largely naive about the world, making social interaction incredibly awkward at best for him. While a kind-hearted soul, León is initially apathetic about his duties as a Makai Knight and sees the Garo armor as both a simple heirloom and a means to avenge his mother's death rather than a symbol of a protector of humanity. Furthermore, León is also still under the protection of the magic that his mother used to protect him from the flames that claimed her life. This manifests in the burn-like markings that appear whenever he is distressed. The magic is fueled by negative emotions and causes León great pain if he is not calmed. If left alone for too long, the spell triggers the automatic donning of the Garo armor, sending León into a berserker rage where he will lash out at friend and foe alike.
During the battle with Mendoza, León loses himself in implanted visions of his mother's death, warping his armor with rage as he becomes the mindless Lost Soul Beast Garo (心滅獣身牙狼, Shinmetsu Jūshin Garo) whose raging Madō Fire explodes in an inferno that incinerates the town of Santa Bard within moments and endangers many innocent humans. After being taken down and stripped of his title by Alfonso, León loses his purpose in life. After a suicide attempt, León finds himself taken in by a farming family living somewhere downriver from Santa Bard and begins working as a farmhand while befriending Lara. Though León resolves to remain a farmhand after making amends with Alfonso, his peaceful days tragically end when a massive Horror slaughters Lara and her family. After burying Lara and contemplating his path, León vows to protect others so they would not have to suffer what he had and regains the Garo armor from Alfonso. Soon after, León has a one-night stand with Ema. Following Medoza's defeat, León becomes a mentor to his half-brother Roberto, training him in the Makai arts so he may one day become a Makai Knight and inherit the Zoro armor.
Originally, due to León's bitter and angry nature, the Garo armor was warped into a slender and angular appearance, featuring long scarves ending in heavy rings, which can be used to snare opponents. In addition, the armor, when donned, cracks dramatically down the left side. Intense flames continually flow from the cracks, only being calmed after León forms a contract with Zaruba. This form is referred to as Garo León Kokuin Version (牙狼レオン刻印ver.). Once León overcomes his inner demons and accepts his role as a protector, the Garo armor takes on its natural appearance. Both forms have red eyes. León exhibits far more control over the armor in its true state, as it does not crack or emit flames, nor does it carry the risk of the original form's berserker state, though it is able to project an aura of emerald-colored Madō Fire to strengthen attacks.
During the final battle with Mendoza, León uses both his sword and his father's weapons to combine the Garo and Zoro armors into Double Extreme Fusion Garo (双烈融身牙狼, Sōretsu Yūshin Garo). This composite armor possesses emerald-colored Madō Fire wings, León's original Garo armor's scarves, and Zoro's chain reels and is capable of flight. During the events of Garo: Divine Flame, León displays the ability to summon the golden-armored Madō Horse (魔導馬, Madōba) known as Gōten (ゴウテン), (Note: Alternately spelled "Gōten" (轟天), literally translated as "roaring heavens.") the traditional steed of the Golden Knight. During the final battle with the Horror Sir Venus, León becomes Heavenly Sword Glitter Garo (天剣煌身牙狼, Tenken Kōshin Garo), composed of the will of past Golden Knights, which is capable of flight and features multiple blades that can be detached from the armor and directed remotely.
Germán Luis (ヘルマン・ルイス, Heruman Ruisu)
Voiced by: Kenyu Horiuchi (Japanese); David Wald (English)
Germán Luis is León Luis's father and a Makai Knight who holds the title of Zoro the Shadow Cutting Knight (絶影騎士・ゾロ, Zetsuei Kishi Zoro). Germán had once called himself "Roberto" (ロベルト, Roberuto). Before León was born, Germán and his wife Anna were imprisoned and tried for witchcraft in a campaign to hunt down Makai practitioners in the Valiante Kingdom. Germán escaped from his cell too late to save Anna, only arriving in time to save their son as he was protected by Anna's magic. Germán raised the boy outside the kingdom, hunting Horrors and avoiding Valiante's military.
Germán displays an easy-going, somewhat cocky, suave personality, and is a womanizer. However, he is also something of a deadbeat, once begging his son to lend him money (or, as he words it, "love") to pay for a prostitute who turned out to be the Horror they were tracking down. He regularly sleeps around with prostitutes and attempts to seduce women, defending the behavior by claiming he needs another son to one day inherit the Zoro title and armor as León inherited the Garo armor from his mother. Despite his annoying antics and playboy mannerisms, he is actually very perceptive and bold, and will turn serious and properly get work done when the situation demands it. While he finds his son's bitter disposition irritating, often suffering physical abuse from the boy when his behavior as perceived as adding further insult to Anna's memory, he nonetheless tolerates it all out of love for León. Germán is later severely injured during the battle against Mendoza, but he is taken in by innkeeper Ximena Coronado, who tends to his wounds and offers a bed. Germán is soon forced to leave Ximena when the Watchdog Garm orders him to start working with a previously thought dead Mendoza. It was only after Mendoza's true intentions are revealed that he aids his son in stopping him. Germán is eventually slain by a horde of Horrors and his soul is added to the crystal used to revive Anima. The only thing León is able to recover from his father is a single knife. After the final battle with Mendoza, it is revealed that Ximena is pregnant with Germán's child Roberto who León trains to one day inherit the Zoro title. Germán is brought back from the Demon World by Garm during the events of Garo: Divine Flame, existing in a Horror-like state that causes Horror-detecting tools to react to him and gives him a limited time in the mortal realm before becoming a full-fledged Horror. When the Horror Sir Venus is slain, Germán returns to the Demon World.
In battle, Germán wields two knives that transform into curved short swords with hand guards in his armored form. These blades are attached to Zoro's arms with chains wound around reels on his wrists and can be extended and retracted. The swords can also either be combined into a large spade-like blade, or detached from the chains and combined at the hilts into a boomerang-like form. His armor is silver in color, and features an asymmetrical design and a tattered cape. Germán is partnered with a similarly silver-armored Madō Horse known as Getsuei (ゲツエイ), (Note: From the Japanese word "getsuei" (月影), meaning "moonlight.") which he can summon as Zoro. The Zoro armor also displays the ability to surround itself with an aura of blue Madō Fire, strengthening Germán's attacks.
Alfonso San Valiante (アルフォンソ・サン・ヴァリアンテ, Arufonso San Variante)
Voiced by: Katsuhito Nomura (Japanese); Justin Briner (English)
Alfonso San Valiante is the crown prince of the Valiante Kingdom, a noble and courageous young man who is willing to go to any length to protect his kingdom and people. On his twentieth birthday, Alfonso received a golden pendant that his mother, Queen Esmeralda, owned throughout her life. Embedded in the pendant is the symbol of Garo, a red gem in the shape of a triangle contained within a golden circle. Alfonso is noted to have been a fairly frail and sickly child, however, he managed to grow up as a strong, healthy, and formidable swordsman. When his father's adviser, Mendoza, usurps the crown, Alfonso is forced to become a fugitive to seek out the "Knight of Light" (光の騎士, Hikari no Kishi) to correct the wrongs. In his travels, Alfonso finds a mentor in the Makai Knight Rafael Banderas, who explains that his mother belongs to the lineage of the Golden Knight, Garo. Following Rafael's death at the hands of the Horror Anfel, Alfonso succeeds his master as Gaia the Knight of Defense (堅陣騎士・ガイア, Kenjin Kishi Gaia) (Note: The word "kenjin" (堅陣) literally translates to "stronghold." However, official subtitles render the word as "defense.") and slays the Horror. During the battle against Mendoza, seeing his cousin unworthy to be the Golden Knight, Alfonso takes the title of Garo. Balancing his duties as both acting ruler of the kingdom and as the Golden Knight is stressful and tiring for the young prince, but he still manages to garner respect and adoration from everyone he meets. After recognizing León as the true bearer of the Garo armor, Alfonso takes up the title of Gaia once more. Alfonso's Gaia armor and sword shatter in his attempt to halt the Watchdog Center's advance on Santa Bard. During the events of Garo: Divine Flame, which take place four years after the end of the series, Alsono's father has recovered and returned to ruling the kingdom, though it is mentioned that his father is soon to step down and Alfonso will be crowned king. Alfonso has also developed a budding relationship with a girl named Christina (クリスティーナ, Kurisutīna) and helps León and Ximena raise and train Roberto.
As Gaia, Alfonso dons a heavy suit of red-violet and gold armor with a cape and wields a massive great sword. His armor's design is mostly identical to Rafael's, save for a slimmer physique and blue eyes instead of orange. He is able to project blue Madō Fire, which he can use to propel himself at great speeds and strike with unrelenting force. Despite the armor being broken during the final battle of the series, Alfonso is still able to summon it during the time of the movie, albeit with some alterations to the armor's appearance such as wing-like ornamentation on the shoulders and replacing the tattered cape with a trailing scarf. Alfonso also displays the ability to summon a red-violet-armored Madō Horse known as Tenjin (テンジン). (Note: From the Japanese word "tenjin" (天神), meaning "heavenly god.") As Garo, Alfonso's armor more closely resembles the suit worn by his and León's grandfather, featuring the same cape and eye color as his Gaia armor. His Garo pendant is also prominently displayed, embedded in the armor's breastplate.
Ema Guzmán (エマ・グスマン, Ema Gusuman)
Voiced by: Romi Park (Japanese); Monica Rial (English)
Ema Guzmán is a Makai Alchemist who acts alone. She is a smart and bold person, gladly embracing the term "witch" and allowing herself to be beaten and captured solely to get into an enemy lair. She is also rather brash, as despite her harsh predicament at the hands of her captors, she remains calm and never stops mouthing off.
She wields a retractable monomolecular wire contained in a gun-shaped spindle, both a weapon in physical combat as well as a magic focus. Her normal weapon is a small pistol-like tool, though she also possesses a staff-like weapon that can convert into a scoped rifle form, which allows her to release several threads at once for tracking or trapping purposes. She also displays the ability to use her hair as a weapon, turning her ponytail into a prehensile spear, though this requires her to actually remove said hair from her scalp. Despite being a Makai Alchemist, she is shown to be very adept at physical combat. She also shows some recognition of León's markings and their meaning. Ema adopts a playful and teasing, yet concerned attitude towards the boy, deeply shocked and apologetic when she causes him to reveal he is still a virgin. Ema was once married to another Makai Alchemist named Luciano, who was eventually possessed by the Horror Arabel, making Ema vow to be the one to slay him. Ema exhibits some distaste towards Makai Knights in general, finding them arrogant for thinking she, as a Makai Alchemist and a woman, would not be strong enough to fight Horrors on her own. Nevertheless, she comes to the aid of León's company time and again, and is on good terms with them. After slaying Arabel so Luciano can finally rest, Ema and León engage in a one-night stand. After the final battle with Mendoza, Ema parts ways with León and Alfonso, intending to return to her hometown. She reunites with the group during the events of Garo Divine: Flame, but parts ways with them unannounced once the Horror Sir Venus is defeated.
Jiruba (ジルバ)
Voiced by: Aya Endō (Japanese); Jennifer Seman (English)
Madō Bracelet Jiruba (魔導具ジルバ, Madōgu Jiruba) is the Madō Tool partnered to Germán. She has a personality like a young woman and has a curt, serious demeanor, never speaking unless absolutely necessary. According to Germán, Jiruba had not spoken in several years before she briefly chastises him as he leaves Ximena's inn. Jiruba's distaste with speech extends to her Horror-detecting abilities, where she will instead rattle and vibrate to alert her holder rather than vocally warn them. Jiruba is later converted into a pendant and given to a pregnant Ximena as a protective charm and will one day be given to Roberto when he inherits the title of Zoro.

=== Supporting characters ===
Fernando San Valiante (フェルナンド・サン・ヴァリアンテ, Ferunando San Variante)
Voiced by: Kōsuke Gotō (Japanese); Ben Phillips (English)
Fernando San Valiante is the king of the Valiante Kingdom. He personally attends the execution of Anna, and the alleged curse she put on him has left him requiring the use of a wheelchair, which was an excuse Mendoza used to stage his anti-Makai campaign. The king employed Mendoza as an advisor when the former Alchemist managed to allegedly cure a plague spreading fast in the city, and trusted Mendoza more and more for his exemplary services, never realizing that Mendoza had staged everything in order to gain his current position. Four years after Mendoza's defeat, Fernando fully recovers and returns to the throne, but it is mentioned that he will soon step down to allow Alfonso to take the throne.
Esmeralda (エスメラルダ, Esumeraruda)
Voiced by: Natsumi Tada (Japanese); Dawn M. Bennett (English)
Esmeralda is the queen of the Valiante Kingdom. Throughout her life, she carried a pendant featuring Garo's emblem, which she treats as a protective charm. She presents it to her son, Alfonso, on his twentieth birthday, which alerted Mendoza to her and her son's bloodline. When her husband, the king, is poisoned, she is accused of treason and is arrested. Rafael later reveals to Alfonso that Esmeralda is Anna's younger sister who was adopted into a noble family at a very young age, though she is unaware of this fact. Esmeralda is later found by Alfonso having committed suicide when she heard from the guards that her son returned to Santa Bard to prevent Mendoza from using her as a hostage against Alfonso. Alfonso, in turn, while mourning his mother's death, is left wondering if he would have been able to chastise León as he did had Mendoza actually used his mother as a hostage.
Garcia (ガルシア, Garushia)
Voiced by: Katsuhisa Hōki (Japanese); Jeremy Inman (English)
Garcia serves as one of Alfonso's vassals. When Mendoza usurps the crown, he helps Alfonso flee Valiante.
Ximena Coronado (ヒメナ・コロナード, Himena Koronādo)
Voiced by: Yumi Sudō (Japanese); Jad Saxton (English)
Ximena co-owns an inn with her father in the Valiante Kingdom capital city, Santa Bard. She initially meets Germán when he is left naked and without his equipment and gives him a sheet to protect his dignity. She later nurses Germán back to health when he is critically injured during the battles against Mendoza and León in his Lost Soul Beast form. Germán and Ximena briefly bond during his stay at her inn. As such, she is one of the few women he treats with any sort of actual respect and compassion. Ximena shows some medical knowledge, as she is able to treat Germán's severe wounds without any apparent side-effects. Ximena is later revealed to be pregnant with Germán's child, revealed in Divine Flame to be a son named Roberto, who is destined to become the next Zoro.
Roberto Luis (ロベルト・ルイス, Roberuto Ruisu)
Voiced by: Miyu Tomita
Ximena and Germán's son and León's paternal half brother, named after his father. He is three years old by the time of Garo: Divine Flame. León has already begun training the boy as a Makai Knight, intending to make him the successor of the Zoro title and armor. Roberto is kidnapped by Dario Montoya, who intends to use the boy as a sacrifice to activate Zirkel's Circle and restore the Horror Nigra Venus to its human form.

=== Antagonists ===
Mendoza (メンドーサ, Mendōsa)
Voiced by: Takaya Hashi (Japanese); Vic Mignogna (English)
Mendoza is a close advisor to King Fernando San Valiante, a former Makai Alchemist who believed he and others in the Makai Order to be superior to humans. He served the Senate (元老院, Genrōin), but was excommunicated for creating Zirkel's Circle (ツィルケルの輪, Tsirukeru no Wa), a powerful Madō Tool that uses human blood to allow one to control Horrors, claiming the Tool would give the Makai order unlimited power. For using the Madō Tool and showing utter lack of repentance for sacrificing normal humans, Mendoza was branded with glowing red marks all over his body with his descendants cursed so his line would forever be banished from the Makai order. Though Mendoza manages to suppress the markings as he became advisor to Fernando, he is forced to slaughter his family after witnessing his newborn child bearing the marks. This act fuels Mendoza's desire for revenge on the Makai people ever further as he uses his position to spearhead a witch hunt to torture and execute hundreds of Makai practitioners in Valiante.
Years later, after learning Alfonso is of the Garo lineage, Mendoza stages a coup d'état by poisoning the king and framing Queen Esmeralda for treason. He later acquires Zirkel's Circle and uses it to infest Valiante with Horrors. Mendoza is unceremoniously and abruptly devoured by the powerful Horror Blood Moon, initially summoned to combat Alfonso, who had claimed the Garo armor just moments before. It is later revealed that Mendoza is still alive, now with a severely aged appearance, resuming the final stage of his plans deep within the catacombs of Castle Santa Bard as Garm orders Germán to assist him. Mendoza soon reveals to Germán that his true intention is obtain immortality by reviving the ancient Horror Anima with a crystal containing the souls of the Makai practitioners that were slaughtered during the witch hunts. It was only after learning Mendoza's true goal that Germán rebels and joins his son and nephew in stopping him. Mendoza is mortally wounded by León mere moments before Anima is revived, but absorbs Anima to gain almost limitless power. He is finally defeated when León forces him into the Demon World and Anna's spirit, through León's protective seals, engulfs him in eternal flame which also acts as sort of manacles to keep him trapped.
Octavia (オクタビア, Okutabia)
Voiced by: Mari Doi (Japanese); Colleen Clinkenbeard (English)
Octavia is a woman serving Mendoza who knows the truth behind his witch hunt against the Makai Knights and Alchemists. She pledged her loyalty to Mendoza after losing faith in God for failing to save her parents and sister from a wolf pack and witnessing firsthand the power the "devil" wields, claiming that Mendoza's power is more substantial and thus worthy of worship and servitude. She becomes his servant under the condition that she is never to touch him. Even after Mendoza's assumed death, Octavia continues to serve at the palace as no one is aware of her involvement with her master's plans. When placed in a situation were her association with Mendoza would be exposed, cursing being left with no alternative, Octavia is forced to sacrifice her right leg to the summoned Horror Resume to avoid being discovered by Alfonso, Ema, and León. Later, fueled by her hatred of Makai Knights, Octavia uses the power of Mendoza's staff to become Soul Metal (ソウルメタル, Sōru Metaru)-based, Demon Beast Armor-clad being called Demon Beast Armored Octavia (魔獣装甲オクタビア, Majū Sōkō Okutabia), willingly sacrificing her humanity for her master, as the Armor is powered by her hate and slowly eats away her life force. She is eventually killed after surpassing her time limit in wearing it and inflicting a wound on Ema with her remaining strength, while the victorious Makai Alchemist destroyed what had left of her in turn..
Bernardo Dion (ベルナルド・ディオン, Berunarudo Dion)
Voiced by: Hiroshi Yanaka (Japanese); Ivan Jasso (English)
Bernardo is a fallen Makai Knight serving Mendoza, holding the title of Zex the Dark Knight (暗黒騎士・ゼクス, Ankoku Kishi Zekusu). Once a dedicated, by-the-book Makai Knight known as Zex the Green Meditation Knight (翠瞑騎士・ゼクス, Suimei Kishi Zekusu), Bernardo was a friend of Germán and Anna, though he is envious towards the former for his carefree attitude and relationship with the latter. Though he uses sparring matches as a means to vent his frustration with Germán, he is unable to fight him seriously due to the Makai Order forbidding Makai Knights from fighting to the death. Bernardo loses his faith in humanity when Germán and Anna are captured during the witch hunts. In anger, he breaks the Makai order's most sacred law, forbidding them from ever raising arms against humans, and cuts down several soldiers before being mortally wounded and losing his left hand. Near death, Bernardo is found by Mendoza, who offers him a chance at life and revenge against the people who harmed his friends. Bernardo eagerly accepts the man's offer for new life in return for his servitude, realizing it would allow him to seriously fight Germán as an enemy. Mendoza turns Bernardo into a Horror-like being with a prosthetic gauntlet covering a blade embedded in his left forearm. Bernardo oversees the Black Knights (黒の騎士団, Kuro no Kishidan), Horror-possessed soldiers who begin to replace Valiante's capitol guard, while training to finally settle things with Germán. When Germán, León, and Alfonso make their way through Valiante's castle to face Mendoza, Bernardo finally has his duel with Germán. The battle ends with Bernardo being fatally injured. He briefly returns to his old self, seemingly with no memory of the last seventeen years, and asks his former friend to find an heir to his Knight title before he perishes and his body dissolves. His sword similarly dissolves, implying that his armor and title are indefinitely lost with their owner's death.
As Zex, Bernardo dons black armor. He wields a short sword and targe in battle, which become a longsword and large shield when armored. Bernardo has a black-armored Madō Horse named Senkaku (センカク) (Note: Alternately spelled "Senkaku" (穿角), literally translated as "piercing horn.") as his steed, which he can summon in battle as Zex. His sword, shield and horse can be combined into a drill weapon. He is incredibly powerful, able to swat aside other armored Makai Knights with ease. Before falling to darkness, the Zex armor and his horse's armor were silvery-green in color.
Dario Montoya (ダリオ・モントーヤ, Dario Montōya)
Voiced by: Masato Hagiwara
Also known as Zem the Obsidian Knight (黒曜騎士・ゼム, Kokuyō Kishi Zemu), Dario is a blind Makai Knight who had been missing for some time until suddenly reappearing during the events of Garo: Divine Flame. In the past, Dario was the personal bodyguard of Sara, the princess of the Vazelia Kingdom (ヴァゼリア国, Vazeria-koku), and held a high degree of loyalty and affection towards her. When a Horror that attacks Sara horrifically burns her face, Dario blinds himself with two daggers out of guilt so she would not feel shame about her appearance. When Sara becomes the Horror Nigra Venus after the fall of Vazelia, Dario remains loyal to her and falls to darkness as well, eventually merging with Nigra Venus to become Sir Venus and finally being cut down by León as Heavenly Sword Glitter Garo. As Zem, Dario dons midnight blue armor and wields a spear with a bladed cross on one end. When he fully reveals himself as Nigra Venus' servant, Zem the Dark Knight (暗黒騎士・ゼム, Ankoku Kishi Zemu), the Zem armor changes, adopting a more sinister appearance and glowing purple accents. Dario has access to a midnight blue Madō Horse known as Raimei (ライメイ). (Note: From the Japanese word "raimei" (雷鳴), meaning "thunder.")

=== Other characters ===
Rafael Banderas (ラファエロ・ヴァンデラス, Rafaero Vanderasu)
Voiced by: Hidetaka Tenjin (Japanese); Ben Bryant (English)
Rafael is a Makai Knight who holds the title of Gaia the Knight of Defense and was closely acquainted with the previous Garo, León Luis' grandfather. Being an adequately sociable person despite his appearance and personality, Rafael was responsible for his friend's younger daughter, Esmeralda, being adopted into a noble family. Rafael's son was killed by a Horror at some point in the past, leaving Rafael without a successor. To compound the issue, he is also stricken with an unspecified terminal illness, periodically coughing up blood. Rafael encounters the fleeing prince Alfonso by chance, revealing to him the truth of his mother being part of Garo's bloodline while agreeing to train Alfonso as his successor after seeing the boy's courage and determination. With his illness worsening, Rafael decides to complete Alfonso's training early by sending the young man after the Horror Anfel. Sacrificing himself to protect Alfonso, Rafael bestows upon him Gaia's sword and title before being devoured by the Horror. He visits Alfonso in a vision one last time before passing on to the afterlife, giving the young prince his blessing.
As Gaia, Rafael dons heavy red-violet and gold armor and transforms the longsword he wields in battle into a massive great sword. He possesses the ability to set his blade aflame by scraping it in a circle the ground, covering it in green Madō Fire, and is capable of slaying Horrors several times his size in one swing. The sheer force created by donning his armor often damages the environment around him.
Garm (ガルム, Garumu)
Voiced by: Mayu Udono (Japanese); Tia Ballard (English)
Garm is a Watchdog (番犬所, Bankenjo) stationed somewhere in Valiante who appears in the form of a diminutive, young, white-haired human woman. However, she is far older than she looks and her true form is implied to be fairly horrifying. Garm displays a lazy, bored personality, often seen lounging on a mass of cushions while indulging herself in sweets or taking part in other leisurely activities. Despite being all-knowing of events in Valiante, Garm has a habit of giving half-truths and ignoring or changing the subject entirely when questioned, with Zaruba explaining this habit as simply Garm saying what she wants. This trait shows itself in ways such as mockingly referring to Mendoza as "Mendooza" (メンデューサ, Mendyūsa) or allowing him to continue his actions while apathetic to the death toll as she plans to send the remaining Makai Knights and Alchemists to Santa Bard via the Watchdog Center to thin out the Horrors' numbers. Garm, against the wishes of the Council, resurrects Germán from the Demon World during the events of Garo: Divine Flame, acting as a relay to anchor him to the mortal realm. In Garo: Vanishing Line, she is hidden behind the kitchen of the diner in Russell City (ラッセルシティ, Rasseru Shiti) where she directs orders to Makai Knights and Alchemists.
This character shares a name with a character known as "Gulm" in the tokusatsu series, but they are not the same entity.
Anna Luis (アンナ・ルイス, Anna Ruisu)
Voiced by: Eri Ōzeki (Japanese); Anastasia Muñoz (English)
Anna is Germán's wife and León's mother, who was burned at the stake 17 years before the present day in the witch hunt inquisition. She is also Esmeralda's older sister, having remained in the Makai Order while her sister is adopted into a noble family so she can pass on the Garo title. Eventually, after Anna marries Germán and bears his son, she is framed by Mendoza for causing the illness afflicting King Fernando. In her final act, Anna uses her magic to create the burn-like seal markings that protect the newborn León from the flames that consumed her as Germán saves their child. Anna's magic continues to protect León from any form of danger after her death. Her spirit protects León one final time during his final battle with Mendoza, engulfing the corrupted Makai Alchemist-turned-Horror in eternal, searing flames before guiding León out of the Demon World.
Gael (ガエル, Gaeru)
Voiced by: Chafurin (Japanese); R Bruce Elliott (English)
Gael is a Makai Alchemist who once fought together with León Luis's maternal grandfather, the previous Garo, in his younger days. When León was a year old, Germán gave a broken Zaruba to Gael to repair, a endeavor which took 16 years. When the Luises return in the present day to retrieve the completed Zaruba, they end up having to fight a Horror that had influenced and later possessed a young Makai Knight named Marcello, who had been serving as Gael's apprentice and assistant, into killing the elderly Makai Alchemist and stealing Zaruba.
The previous Golden Knight (先代黄金騎士, Sendai Ōgon Kishi)
Voiced by: Kazuhiro Yamaji (Japanese); Jeremy Schwartz (English)
The previous holder of the title of Garo, grandfather to León and Alfonso through their mothers Anna and Esmeralda. He is deceased in the present day, but his spirit visits León in a realm outside of time while the latter is unconscious and fulfilling his contract with Zaruba, telling the boy not to fear his flames. He also appears to Rafael Banderas, his lifelong friend, when he is near death, silently offering to escort him to the afterlife, but Rafael refuses and declares he still has work to be done. Rafael once mentioned that while the previous Garo was a force to reckon with in battle, he had poor social skills. Notably, his armor is identical in shape to the armor worn by the Garo title holders in the live action entries of the series.
Lara (ララ, Rara)
Voiced by: Madoka Aiba (Japanese); Brina Palencia (English)
Lara is a girl in a farm village. Her family finds León after his suicide attempt and takes him in, offering him food and a bed in exchange for his help around the farm. Lara becomes attached to León despite his reluctance to open up, but her family's welcoming warmth and her cheerful optimism manage to help him start breaking out of his loner attitude. She and her entire family are later killed in a Horror attack, Lara herself dying in León's arms. León buries her on a hill near the farm where she claimed white chamomile flowers would bloom in the spring.

=== Horrors ===
Demon Beasts Horrors (魔獣ホラー, Majū Horā) are demons that originate from the Demon World (魔界, Makai). The usual variety of Horrors, called "Inga Horrors" (陰我ホラー, Inga Horā; "Yin-Self Horrors") are grotesque black-winged skeletal demons that enter the human world, drawn by their primary "food" of human malice and darkness. They use Inga Gates, objects tainted by darkness, to transverse to the human world, usually taking the first human with inner darkness they come across as a host. From there, either taking over the host or forming a symbiosis, the Horror "evolves" into a unique form based on the Gate they emerged from with personal tastes and feeding habits.

With most summoned and controlled by Zirkel's Circle, the Horrors thrive in the Valiante Kingdom due mainly to the scarcity of Makai practitioners resulting from the Makai witch hunts. Once Alfonso takes the throne, he begins a systematic extermination of the numerous Horrors that continue to terrorize his kingdom after Mendoza's assumed death.

Hanamushi (ハナムシ)
A Horror that possesses the body of a harlot that feeds on her host's clients before being slain by Germán.
Metaclim (メタクリム, Metakurimu)
A dinosaur-like Horror in stocks that possesses the corpse of Guillermo (ギレルモ, Girerumo), a Makai Knight who was executed in Mendoza's arranged witch hunt. Metaclim serves Mendoza by posing as the captain of a squad the advisor sends out of Valiante to assassinate Germán and León, only to end up being slain by the latter.
Ezol (エゾル, Ezoru)
A blade-armed Horror that possesses the body of Father Nicholas (神父ニコラス, Shinpu Nikorasu). Slain by Ema.
Onbla (オンブラ, Onbura)
A Horror with a lance on his left arm that possesses the body of Marcelo (マルセロ, Marusero), an apprentice Makai Knight who was an apprentice to the Makai Alchemist Gael. Slain by León after he make contract with Zaruba.
Banbora (バンボーラ, Banbōra)
A wooden Horror that uses bladed arms as weapons and projects images to lower its opponents' guard. Possessing a woodcutter's doll that belongs to an outcast boy named Alois, Banbora takes advantage of the boy's grudge against the people of his village for murdering his father when he attempted to expose their village's dark secret of performing human sacrifices for good fortune. But Banbora's feedings convince the villagers that Alois's mother, an outsider named Auriela, is a witch and needs to be sacrificed. Once the Makai Knights learn of its existence, Banbora attempts to devour the mob sent to prepare Auriela for sacrifice before being slain by León.
Jemitre (ジェミトレ, Jemitore)
A caterpillar-like Horror that possesses the body of Count Romero (ロメロ伯, Romero-haku). Slain by Rafael.
Almar (アルマー, Arumā)
A Horror that possesses the body of Jordi (ジョルディ, Jorudi), Santa Bard's resident blacksmith. Almar's left shoulder is a self-contained hammer, anvil and forge, with which it can temper and strengthen its sword on the fly. Slain by Germán.
Despera (デスペラ, Desupera)
A Horror that possesses the body of Pepe (ペペ). Slain by León.
Moneta (モネータ, Monēta)
A treasure chest like Horror that possesses the body of Donato (ドナート, Donāto), a thief who helped Irene steal Germán's clothing and money. After possessing Donato's body, Moneta kills the other two thieves before going after Irene and running into Germán as he manages to slay the Horror.
Anfel (アンフェル, Anferu)
A massive and powerful gate-like Horror that came to be known as the Chimera of Orvien (オルビエンのキマイラ, Orubien no Kimaira). The older Makai Knight deciding to use it as a final test his apprentice, Anfel managed to kill Rafael before being slain by Alfonso when he inherit his mentor's Makai Knight armor and title.
Blood Moon (ブラッドムーン, Buraddo Mūn)
A massive and powerful Horror that is also known as the Apostle of Dawn Moon (暁月の使徒, Gyōgetsu no Shito). Blood Moon is summoned forcibly by Mendoza from Zirkel's Circle. Blood Moon unceremoniously devours Mendoza mere seconds before he can battle Alfonso, who had just taken up Garo's sword.
Aboradura (アボラデュラ)
An armored skeletal Horror that possesses the body of Lord Rolando (ロランド卿, Rorando-kyō). Slain by Germán.
Convexo (コンベクスォ, Konbekuswo)
A Horror that possesses the body of Count Albar Juste (アルバール・ジャステ伯, Arubāru Jasute-haku). Slain by Alfonso.
Medicruz (メディクルス, Medikurusu)
A Horror that possesses the body of Michael (ミケル, Mikeru) who idolized a wandering masked physician named Fabian. Possessed by the Horror, Michael assumed his idol's identity while presenting himself in Santa Bard as a miracle physician. In Horror form, Michael has the ability to heal and augment himself using a variety of surgical tools in the drawers on his chest. While Michael nearly killed Germán, his insatiable need to heal and mend led to his downfall when the Makai Knight cuts Michael down while he was tending to his severe wounds.
Grand Magus (グランドマグス, Gurando Magusu)
A massive and incredibly dangerous serpentine Horror that burrows underground. Grand Magus destroys Lara's family's farmstead and slaughters the entire family before being cut down by Alfonso.
Mandura (マンドゥーラ, Mandūra)
A plant Demon Echo Horror (魔響ホラー, Makyō Horā) and one of Apostle Horrors (使徒ホラー, Shito Horā) that constantly wails and moans while using its vines to ensnare and whip victims. Mandura is cut down with the combined efforts of Alfonso as Gaia and León, who had just recently reclaimed Garo.
Arabel (アラベル, Araberu)
A raven-like Horror that can transform into a high-speed aircraft-like form armed with guns and missiles. This Horror came from the inner darkness of Luciano Guzmán (ルシアーノ・グスマン, Rushiāno Gusuman), Ema Guzmán's husband and a Makai Alchemist, by playing on the man's desire to learn how to save Horror-possessed individuals rather than slay them. What made his fall from grace tragic was strings of tragedy revolving a married woman whom husband they forced to kill due to his possession by a Horror and the same woman wind up suffer the same fate as her late love coupled with ridicule from arrogant Makai Knights for such desire. From there, Arabel runs rampant for years, killing countless Makai Knights (including ones who mistreated him) and innocent humans. Ema eventually tracks Arabel down and slays him on her own at her insistence, finally putting her husband to rest.
Resume (レジューム, Rejūmu)
A twin-headed Horror that was sealed in an egg-shaped Madō Tool by Mendoza for his use. Resume can be controlled by whoever releases it.
Gemellus (ゲメルス, Gemerusu)
A Horror that can create clones of itself.
Anima (アニマ)
Anima is an ancient giant Horror of great power, resembling a headless human female with shiny blue skin and mouths on the palm of her hands. As Anima was sealed beneath the Valiante Kingdom by the Makai Order, Mendoza schemed to revive the Horror to obtain immortality. This plot involved Mendoza engineering his conquest of Valiante and creating a crucifix-shaped crystal composed of the souls of countless Makai practitioners that were killed in his witch hunt. The Watchdog Garm intends to allow Mendoza to carry out his plan, sending the remaining Makai Knights and Alchemists to Santa Bard via the Watchdog Center to thin out the Horrors' numbers despite the inevitable total destruction of Santa Bard and countless human deaths that would result from such a plan. Anima is eventually revived with the crucifix-shaped crystal embedded through her torso. Anima is absorbed by Mendoza, who becomes a god-like being before being ultimately subjected to the flames from Anna's protection spell transferred from León.
Blade-Armed Spider Horror
A Horror that possesses the body of Tobias (トビアス, Tobiasu). Slain by Ema.
Crimson Gale (クリムゾンゲイル, Kurimuzon Geiru)
A Horror with blades on the back of his hands that possesses the body of a young woman. Slain by León.
Nigra Venus (ニグラ・ヴェヌス, Nigura Venusu)
Voiced by: Arisa Komiya
The antagonist of Garo: Divine Flame, Nigra Venus is an Apostle Horror known as "the most beautiful Horror," which feeds on the souls of men and eats the faces of women. Nigra Venus was once Sara (サラ), the princess of the Vazelia Kingdom, a small kingdom on a lake neighboring Valiante. Sara is a attacked by a Horror one night and her face is burned by the Horror's poisonous saliva before Dario Montoya, her personal bodyguard and the Makai Knight known as Zem the Obsidian Knight, can slay it. She begins wearing a veil to hide the horrific scars and Dario blinds himself out of guilt. In despair, Sara single-handedly burns the kingdom to the ground and attempts to commit suicide by jumping into Vazelia Lake, the act allowing Nigra Venus to possess her. Nigra Venus later becomes Sir Venus (サー・ヴェヌス, Sā Venusu) when it merges with Dario. Sir Venus is cut down by León as Heavenly Sword Glitter Garo.

== Crimson Moon ==
=== Main characters ===
Raikou (雷吼, Raikō)
Voiced by: Masei Nakayama, Megumi Han (child) (Japanese); Clifford Chapin (English)
Raikou is the wielder of the Garo armor during the Heian period in Japan. He was discovered by Seimei as a young teenager already in possession of the Garo armor, blindly wandering through a forest as a Lost Soul Beast covered in Horrors for reasons yet unknown. Seimei manages to release him from the armor and puts a seal on Zaruba, preventing Raikou from summoning his armor without her permission. Raikou is shown to normally be somewhat impulsive and naive, though he is deeply devoted to his duty as a Makai Knight to slay Horrors and protect people and becomes very serious when Horrors are involved. His real name is Minamoto no Yorimitsu (源 頼光); "Raikou" is simply a nickname given to him by his family's retainers. Raikou was exiled from his home at a young age in a bid to have the Garo armor pass to his paternal half-brother, Minamoto no Yorinobu, thereby putting the Golden Knight in the hands of the corrupt aristocrats, and wandered alone for some time before being discovered by Seimei. Raikou realizes he cares deeply for Seimei after she leaves him behind, falling into a depression. After Seimei becomes Rudra's vessel, Raikou nearly slays her until Kaguya intervenes. After the battle, Raikou notes that he feels Seimei's true self fighting against the darkness that has consumed her. He vows to save her, bringing himself into conflict with Inari and Yasusuke, who believe Seimei is lost forever and must be slain before Rudra can fully awaken. Later, through a ritual performed by Haruaki, Raikou enters Seimei's spirit and frees her from Rudra's control.
As Garo the Golden Knight, Raikou's armor features blue eyes and a somewhat dulled appearance. Using the armor is incredibly taxing on Raikou's body and quickly wears down his stamina. Eventually, learning the reasons behind the seal and vowing to protect Seimei in return, Raikou permanently breaks the seal on his own, allowing him to summon the Garo armor at will. In addition, the armor assumes a more powerful form known as Garo Battle Formation (牙狼陣, Garo Jin), also known simply as Garo Raikou Version (牙狼雷吼ver.), featuring a design reminiscent of traditional Japanese armor. The Battle Formation state is capable of freely emitting emerald-colored Madō Fire, incinerating lesser Horrors effortlessly. Kintoki refers to the Battle Formation state as Raikou's "true form". During the final battle with Rudra, Seimei's barrier, which separates the battle from normal time, is cracked and Raikou unwittingly exceeds the time limit on his armor, becoming Lost Soul Beast Garo once more. However, due to already having assumed and overcome the form in the past, he is able to regain control of himself. Seimei then grants him the power of Winged Garo (翼人牙狼, Tsubasabito Garo), allowing the Garo Battle Formation state to take flight with a pair of ornate golden wings, featuring a bow of red rope that can be used for offensive and defensive purposes. In Usuzumizakura: Garo, Raikou displays the ability to summon his Mado Horse, Gōten (轟天), becoming its first rider. The spear once used to seal the Horror Usuzumizakura grants him the power of Garo Spear Battle Formation (牙狼槍陣, Garo Sōjin).
Kintoki (金時)
Voiced by: Akiko Yajima, Mamoru Miyano (Tokiwaka) (Japanese); Mikaela Krantz (English)
Kintoki is a young boy who idolizes Raikou and aspires to be his apprentice, but he is considered to be too young despite often being more down to earth, mature, and responsible than his senior. The metal rods he carries, when slammed together, produce sparks that can be used to sense if someone has been possessed by a Horror. Raikou and Yasusuke also display the ability to set their blades aflame in their armored forms by drawing them across Kintoki's clubs. Kintoki is hinted to be much older than he seems, apparently always having the appearance of a child. It is revealed in an extra episode that Kintoki's real name is Tokiwaka (常若), a Makai Knight who was once a young adult, but whose armor had the unexplained side-effect of making him younger and erasing his memories with each use. Additionally, the armor's side-effect prevents him from aging naturally. As a result, Tokiwaka gained a reputation as a Makai Knight who never used his armor. Tokiwaka met Raikou's mother Tamagushi (玉櫛) years ago and vowed to protect her, sacrificing his memories and adult body to protect her and her unborn son from a group of Horrors one night. A year later, having taken the form of Kintoki and now employed as the Minamoto clan's retainer, Tamagushi entrusts him with the protection of the infant Raikou despite not remembering the promise he made to her as Tokiwaka. As Tokiwaka, he wields dual axes that can be combined into a dual-headed form and his armor is apparently green in color.
Seimei (星明)
Voiced by: Romi Park, Madoka Aiba (child) (Japanese); Monica Rial (English)
Seimei is a Makai Alchemist and onmyōji who acts as Raikou's "handler", having discovered him as a Lost Soul Beast in the past and put a seal on the Garo armor that prevents him from using it on his own. She believes beauty is important, and will often remark upon it when she sees it. Seimei normally shows a playful, easygoing, immature personality, having an affinity for sweets and rare treasures, but will quickly become serious when the situation demands it. She often poses as a courtesan to lure men in for her own interests. She also has an unexplained hatred for butterflies and is noted to be a frequent liar. She seems to enjoy having Raikou under her thumb, intentionally causing frustration for him and adamantly refusing to release the seal on his armor for any longer than absolutely necessary. Raikou recognizes that the seal is only in place so Seimei can control him and frequently demands she release it permanently, but she always either ignores him or changes the subject, claiming that he would be consumed by the armor's power again. It is later revealed that Seimei created the seal specifically to keep Raikou safe and close to her, having fallen in love with him at some point after they met. It is also revealed later that the seal requires constant maintenance, which continuously drains away at Seimei's own life force. She maintains the seal out of fear that Raikou's incredible devotion to his duty might eventually lead to him senselessly throwing his life away to save people.
It is later revealed that her real name is Kiyome (きよめ), a daughter of the Abe clan and Abe no Haruaki's granddaughter. However, she relinquished her name and birthright to become a Makai Alchemist in order to avenge the deaths of her parents, who sacrificed themselves to seal numerous Horrors. She found a mentor in Priest Douma, who gave her the name "Seimei", meaning dark and light, and encouraged her to embrace her inner darkness, a notion Seimei found disagreeable enough to part ways with Douma. She often comes into conflict with the nobility and onmyōji of Heian-kyō because of her history. After Raikou manages to break the seal on the Garo armor on his own, Seimei parts ways with him and Kintoki, deeply shaken by how close she had come to falling to darkness with them. She is later found wandering alone, struck with a curse placed on her by Priest Douma, which she once used to drain away darkness latched onto the Garo armor. The curse slowly uses her inner darkness to transform her body into a vessel for the powerful Horror known as Rudra.
Aside from her ability to control the seal on the Garo armor, Seimei also displays the ability to create a spiritual barrier to prevent Horrors from escaping battles with Garo. She later binds the Horror that was once her mother Katsurako to a large chariot-like Madō Tool, giving her the ability to take a more active role in combat.
Once she fully becomes Rudra's vessel, Seimei's appearance changes. Her hair and eyes darken and she begins wearing a dark-colored outfit with a prominent crescent moon tattoo. Rudra's personality overshadows hers, making it seem as if she has no recollection of Raikou and Kintoki. She now utilizes dark magic and displays the ability to dissolve into a swarm of dark butterflies to distract or elude an opponent. She appears to be immortal, as she comes back to life when Yasusuke manages to slay her, although she is visibly drained when she does come back. However, her powers are no match for Kaguya's, as she becomes useless once Kaguya begins chanting a sealing spell. Later, during a ritual performed by her grandfather, Abe no Haruaki, allowing Raikou to enter Seimei's spirit and release her in exchange for Haruaki himself becoming Rudra's vessel. After returning to her true self, Seimei keeps the oversized Madō Brush (魔導筆, Madōhitsu) her possessed form carried, able to use it to launch powerful attacks. Seimei, being of the Abe clan, is the only person able to unleash Kaguya's true power, assisting her in sealing Rudra once and for all.
Fujiwara no Yasusuke (藤原 保輔)
Voiced by: Daisuke Namikawa (Japanese); Ricco Fajardo (English)
Yasusuke is a member of the Heian-kyō police magistrate, a member of the Fujiwara clan despite having never felt like a noble. Overcome with the pressures of his noble obligations and frustrated with the aristocracy's neglect of common citizens, Yasusuke relinquishes his title and name and becomes a thief who steals from aristocrats, taking on the name Hakamadare (袴垂). He is later shown to have formed a gang of thieves that steal from aristocrats and give to the poor, vowing never to take a life unless absolutely necessary. By twist of fate, Yasusuke eventually receives his family's armor, thought to be long lost, through a distant relative and becomes a Makai Knight, taking on the title of Zanga the White Lotus Knight (白蓮騎士・斬牙（ザンガ）, Byakuren Kishi Zanga). (Note: The word "byakuren" (白蓮) literally translates to "white lotus." However, official subtitles render the word as "silver.") (Note: The kanji that make up the name "Zanga" (斬牙) are literally translated as "Slashing Fang.") As an aristocrat, he is a firm and honorable character who has a soft spot for the common people and never looks down on people who are of lower social status. After he becomes the thief Hakamadare, he adopts a brash and aggressive personality, and is now openly disdainful of the aristocracy, making scornful remarks at them whenever a chance to do so presents itself. Yasusuke comes into conflict with Raikou once his brother Fujiwara no Yasumasa is killed by Seimei, insisting that she must be slain and can not be saved despite Raikou's beliefs to the contrary. After a duel, Yasusuke agrees to not kill Seimei, but warns Raikou to not allow any more lives to be lost. After Seimei is freed, Yasusuke rejoins the group in order to slay Rudra once and for all, giving Kaguya the magic book that kept the protective seal on the Light Palace so she can remember the sealing incantation.
As Zanga, Yasusuke dons ornate white armor with gold, silver and blue accents and wields a large scimitar. Unlike other Makai Knights, who draw one or two separate circles with their blades to summon their armor, Yasusuke traces an infinity symbol (∞). He is able to "walk on air" by stepping off magical ripples he forms under his feet. Yasusuke is later given an orb containing blue Madō Fire by Inari. Drawing his blade across the orb allows the Zanga armor to be engulfed in a light blue fiery aura, increasing his strength such that he can break one of the possessed Seimei's dark magic circles. He is also able to set his blade aflame by drawing it across one of Kintoki's clubs. In Usuzumizakura: Garo, Yasusuke now assigned to Kukoku and returns to defeat Usuzumizakura. He also displays the ability to summon his Madō Horse, Rekka (レッカ).
Goruba (ゴルバ)
Voiced by: Chō (Japanese); Shawn Gann (English)
Madō Bracelet Goruba (魔導具ゴルバ, Madōgu Goruba) is a Madō Tool in Fujiwara no Yasusuke's possession that has been in the possession of the Nanke. He originally belonged to the previous Zanga and boss of a gang of robbers known as Tenkaimaru (天戒丸), once Fujiwara no Tokitada (藤原 時忠) and a distant relative of Yasusuke's, and was given to Yasusuke to facilitate his Makai Knight training in his predecessor's steed. Goruba possesses a personality much like an old man.
He is loosely based on his original series' counterpart that shares the same name.
Fujiwara no Michinaga (藤原 道長)
Voiced by: Kenyu Horiuchi (Japanese); David Wald (English)
Fujiwara no Michinaga is the head of Heian-kyō's aristocratic class. He wishes to simply live as a noble, but must supervise the city. He is enamored with Seimei, but she always gives him the slip. He wishes to have a powerful Makai Knight, preferably the Golden Knight, under his exclusive command to enforce his influence over the region. It is later revealed that the current Ashiya Douman is his brother, cast away as an infant for reasons unknown. Michinaga extends a hand to his brother to join him, but Douman refuses out of spite. Michinaga displays incredible emotional control, staying calm during the attack on the palace and the emergence of the Crimson Moon, and vows that he will never become a Horror. Michinaga seems to be delighted with Raikou's argument about him and Ashiya Douman being the same. However, he also states that Raikou and Ashiya Douman are also the same, much like the philosophy of yin and yang. During Rudra's awakening, Michinaga refuses commoner entry to the Light Palace (光宮, Kōgū) and lies to the populace, finally losing his cool when his magic book, which keeps the protective barrier around the Light Palace in place, is stolen. He mistakenly blames Yorinobu, who had butted heads with him only moments prior, and demands his execution. Post Rudra's attack, Michinaga continues to supervising the cities and become much more cunning and ruthless in disposing of his political enemies. He also the one responsible for Michizane's exile in the past, thus becoming the main target of Akira's revenge. In the end, Michinaga is arrested by the police magistrate due to his borderline affection to the Usuzumizakura.
Inari (稲荷・三狐神)
Voiced by: Mayu Udono, Eriko Satō, Sayaka Sasaki (Japanese); Tia Ballard, Megan Shipman, Alex Moore (English)
Inari are three doll-like women, named respectively Ten (天), Haku (白), and Kū (空), who together serve as the Eastern Watchdog. Like other Watchdogs seen in the series, they have a habit of giving vague half-truths and non-answers when questioned, especially regarding the mysterious lack of Makai Knights in Heian-kyō aside from Raikou and later Yasusuke. It is later revealed that Heian-kyō's Makai practitioners have been spread thin searching for the "key" to the Crimson Moon, a magical seal keeping the Horror known as Rudra at bay, and that Inari's habit of dodging questions about the situation is because of orders from their superiors. The primary member of the trio, the one who sits highest and typically the only one who faces whoever they are addressing, has made it clear more than once that they do not trust Raikou and are annoyed by Yasusuke's brash, disrespectful attitude, although they later begrudgingly praise his thieving skills when he delivers Michinaga's magic book to Kaguya. Collectively, they also seem to enjoy teasing Kintoki, calling him a "bean" despite his protests. Inari does not concern themselves with emotional attachment, sternly ordering both Raikou and Yasusuke to slay Seimei, now the vessel for Rudra, despite their history with her and reminding the Knights that their duty comes first. Inari is able to appear in the mortal realm and hold significant power, able to summon a fox deity to attack foes.

=== Supporting characters ===
Shijō Kintō (四条公任)
Voiced by: Nozomu Sasaki (Japanese); Marcus D. Stimac (English)
Shijō Kintō is the head of the Heian-kyō police magistrate who serves Michinaga. He shown to be devoutly loyal to Michinaga, though this is eventually revealed to be a front, as Kintō is secretly working towards claiming Michinaga's position as head of the aristocracy. Kintō is also discovered to have been hiding evidence of Fujiwara clan members' disappearances, both from his own murders and from Yasusuke cutting down Horrors, in the police magistrate office. Kintō reveals himself as a Horror after Yasumasa presents the discovered evidence to Michinaga and is quickly cut down by Yasusuke, allowing Yorinobu to become the new head of the police magistrate.
Kamo no Yasunori (賀茂 保憲)
Voiced by: Masao Komaya (Japanese); R. Bruce Elliott (English)
Kamo no Yasunori is an onmyōji and the head of the Kamo family who serves Michinaga. He possesses great hatred and jealousy for Abe no Haruaki, which eventually leads to him being swayed by Ashiya Douman's dark power and possessed by a Horror. He is cut down by both Raikou and Yasusuke.
Abe no Haruaki (安武 晴明)
Voiced by: Hidetaka Tenjin (Japanese); Ben Bryant (English)
Seimei's paternal grandfather and a man said to be the most powerful onmyōji in Heian-kyō. He is closest to Michinaga. He taught Seimei several Makai Alchemist skills and is the only other known person who can release the seal on the Garo armor. He eventually reveals to Seimei that the Abe clan are the longtime caretakers of the Crimson Moon, a powerful magical seal designed to keep the ancient Horror known as Rudra at bay. However, when Seimei becomes a vessel of Rudra, Haruaki cannot seal the darkness within her. He is also familiar with Kaguya and has begun assisting both Raikou and Kintoki to get Seimei back. He, along with Kaguya and Raikou, performs a ritual to free Seimei from Rudra's control at the cost of becoming the Horror's vessel himself. However, the group does not manage to cut him down in time and Rudra awakens.
Fujiwara no Yasumasa (藤原 保昌)
Voiced by: Takanori Hoshino (Japanese); Brian Mathis (English)
Fujiwara no Yasumasa is Yasusuke's older brother who is one of Michinaga's Four Heavenly Kings. He is deeply devoted to justice and is a skilled swordsman, though Yasusuke briefly notes that his brother's personality used to be different. He is aware of Yasusuke being Hakamadare and is dedicated to capturing him, but also seems impressed by his brother's willpower. Yasumasa is unceremoniously slain by Seimei under the control of Rudra, causing Yasusuke to vow revenge, bringing both the Golden and Silver Knights into conflict.
Minamoto no Yorinobu (源 頼信)
Voiced by: Katsuhito Nomura (Japanese); Justin Briner (English)
Minamoto no Yorinobu is an expert swordsman who is another of Michinaga's Four Heavenly Kings. He is also Raikou's younger paternal half-brother, a fact he is completely unaware of until Raikou slays a Horror that possesses one of his retainers. Despite not being a Makai Knight like his half-brother, Yorinobu quickly dedicates himself to taking care of the people in his own way, starting with going to poor districts and running a meal line with Suetsumuhana. Yorinobu displays a preference for two-handed swords in battle and is a competent soldier, but is often completely outclassed by Horrors whenever he engages them in combat. After Kintō's demise, he is promoted to the new head of the Heian-kyō police magistrate by Michinaga. Yorinobu, against Michinaga's orders, allows common people to take shelter in the Light Palace during Rudra's reawakening. This, along with the mistaken belief that Yorinobu stole the book keeping the palace's barrier in place, causes Michinaga to order Yorinobu's execution, revealing Michinaga's true colors. Post Rudra's attacks, Yorinobu still becomes the head of police magistrate and helped Raikou during Usuzumisakura emergence.
Izumi Shikibu (和泉式部)
Voiced by: Noriko Hidaka (Japanese); Elizabeth Maxwell (English)
Izumi Shikibu is an informant who Raikou, Seimei, and Kintoki regularly go to for advice. Despite being older than her regular clients and in a position of status, she insists on being addressed as "Izumi-chan." Izumi's favorite saying is "life is fleeting," a belief she shows through a relatively easygoing, flirtatious attitude.
Tada no Shinbochi (多田新発意)
Voiced by: Shinpachi Tsuji, Masanori Takeda (Mitsunaka) (Japanese); John Swasey (English)
Tada no Shinbochi is Yorinobu's and Raikou's father, who remains a powerful Buddhist priest in Heian-kyō. He was a powerful military aristocrat named Minamoto no Mitsunaka (源 満仲) before becoming a Buddhist priest. He is killed by a Horror while protecting Yorinobu's mother, having been chronically ill for some time.
Kaguya (赫夜)
Voiced by: Ayaka Ōhashi (Japanese); Cherami Leigh (English)
Kaguya is a princess who was raised by an elderly couple, apparently found by her foster father as an infant in a bamboo stalk and was born from the moon. She possesses mysterious abilities, including the power to heal wounds with a light touch. Kaguya had many suitors, but they were all slaughtered and it was believed she was a Horror. In truth, Kaguya's foster parents ended up becoming hosts for Horrors due to their greed, demanding expensive and rare treasures as gifts from suitors in Kaguya's name. Once Raikou slays the Horrors, Kaguya decides to return to the moon, having lost the only two people who compelled her to remain on Earth. Kaguya is for unexplained reasons on Earth once more once the moon turns crimson due to Ashiya Douman and Priest Douma's schemes.
Upon reuniting with Raikou, it is revealed that Kaguya is a human-shaped Madō Tool, created by an ancestor of the Abe clan to seal Rudra. She has forgotten the full extent of her power, but is slowly remembering her abilities piece by piece. She displays her aforementioned healing abilities and the power to create a magical barrier, though Haruaki mentions she has the potential to be far more powerful. She's shown to recover almost all of her power during a ritual performed by Abe no Haruaki. Later, after receiving Michinaga's magic book, she is able to remember all 12 lines of Rudra's sealing incantation. After Rudra is sealed, Kaguya returns to the moon once more, promising to watch over her friends and observe humanity's progress.
Tachibana Masamune (橘 正宗)
Voiced by: Kōsuke Gotō (Japanese); Ben Phillips (English)
Tachibana Masamune is a womanizing aristocrat who is a henpecked husband, called "the most worthless aristocrat in the capital." He is seemingly unable to learn from his mistakes and do away with his lecherous ways, as he is quick to celebrate his wife's death (having been consumed by a Horror and slain by Raikou) and his newfound "freedom" to continue lusting after beautiful women.
Suetsumuhana (末摘花)
Voiced by: Kimiko Saitō
Suetsumuhana is an aristocrat, known by other high-class people as the "tragic princess" because of her unfeminine behavior and boisterous attitude, making her undesirable to aristocratic men. She, along with Yorinobu, often visits the poorer districts of Heian-kyō and helps feed the common populace despite her family's protests. She has some skill with a naginata. Suetsumuhana notes that Yorinobu is the first man who has ever seriously called her beautiful.

=== Antagonists ===
Ashiya Douman (蘆屋 道満, Ashiya Dōman)
Voiced by: Tomokazu Seki (Japanese); Taliesin Jaffe (English)
Ashiya Douman is an onmyōji who appears to have some control over the Horrors. His name actually a title he inherited from his mentor Priest Douma. He has significant power, able to produce thorny vines to snare opponents or use his heavily scarred face as an Inga Gate to "infect" others with Horror possession. Douman is obsessed with darkness, willing to go to any lengths to spread evil throughout the land through Rudra's power. It is later revealed that Douman is Fujiwara no Michinaga's long-lost brother, having been scarred and cast out of the clan as an infant. When his identity as a Fujiwara clansman is revealed, Douman refuses Michinaga's offer of an alliance, as their goals are too different despite having similar paths. His power, however, is still no match for the Watchdog Inari. Douman allows Rudra to consume him upon its revival, his body emerging from the Horror's primary face. When Raikou enter's Rudra's inner darkness to cut down Douman, he notes that Douman still clings to some small amount of light, otherwise he would have lost his will and been completely absorbed by the Horror. Once Rudra is sealed, Douman challenges Raikou to one final duel, despite Raikou's protests, and is swiftly defeated. In his final moments, Douman accepts the light, his facial scars fading before his body dissolves in Seimei's arms.
Priest Douma (道摩法師, Dōma Hōshi)
Voiced by: Takaya Hashi (Japanese); Vic Mignogna (English)
Douma is Douman's mentor who was the previous "Ashiya Douman" and knows about Raikou's past, calling him a cursed child. He trained Seimei in the Makai arts and notes that she will forever struggle with the balance of light and darkness within her, constantly taunting her from the shadows. He later places a curse on Seimei, manifesting as dark symbols down her body, slowly transforming her into a vessel for the Horror Rudra. Priest Douma is killed when Ashiya Douman turns on him.
Akira (明羅)
Voiced by: Atsuko Tanaka
Born from Yuuge clan, Akira is a Makai Achelmist and a new onmyōji that serves Michinaga post Rudra's attack. It was revealed that Akira is the daughter of Michizane, which possesses Haji clan lineage. She attempts to use Usuzumizakura to kill Michinaga for her father's exile and subsequently her parents' death. From there, Akira plotted revenge with Tokimaru. She provides Usuzumizakura the way to Michinaga bedchamber using a spell that traces her footsteps. Akira completely disregards human lives as her sole motivation for revenge stands above all. She finally decides to fuse with Usuzumizakura to kill Michinaga, albeit she ultimately failed.
Tokimaru (時丸)
Voiced by: Keisuke Higashi
Tokimaru is Akira's younger brother and a robber. Tokimaru gains notoriety as a highjacker for several murders, claiming that he needs to increases his Inga, in order to revives the Usuzumizakura. After the Horror consuming him in a grotesque way, the tree blooms once more, rendering him in a half-dead state. After the Horror is completed, Tokimaru also completely fused with the Horror, although part of his humanity still existed after hearing Raikou speech of morality. Tokimaru finally dies as he cannot contain the Usuzumizakura power any longer. Thus prompting his sister to fuse with the Horror too.

=== Horrors ===
The Horrors (火羅（ホラー）, Horā) that manifest in Heian period Japan served as the inspiration of the myths of the Preta through appearing from the Demon World. The spiritually unaware simply call them "evil spirits" (もののけ, mononoke).

Engou (閻剛, Engō)
A Nio-like Horror that possesses the body of Junkei (順慶), a busshi who killed beautiful women to use them as models for Bodhisattva statues. Junkei ended up becoming Engou's host when the Horror emerged from a small Bodhisattva statue he created that was placed inside a Nio statue controlled by Douman. Engou acts on Junkei's obsession to kidnap beautiful women to turn them into a Bodhisattva statue until Seimei manages to lure him so Raikou can slay the Horror.
Gaira (骸羅)
Horrors that possess the bodies of imperial envoys.
Dogura (怒蜘羅)
A tsuchigumo Horror. When a Makai Knight named Katsuragi no Chiharu (葛城 千晴) was surrounded by Horrors including Gaira, Dogura manifests upon sensing the fear-induced inner darkness of the Chiharu's apprentice son Katsuragi no Hisayori (葛城 久頼) and possesses the young Hisayori's body before devouring his host's father. The Horror could control any sword, claiming that the sword chose its own master. Dogura is defeated by Raikou, and Hisayori returns to normal and lasts long enough to hold his father's skull before vanishing.
Tengu (天愚)
Horrors that possess the bodies of unlawful onmyou users. The Horrors initially appear in armor, and have the ability to fly and have a fan-like blade to slay humans. Later, one of the Horrors' armor is broken, revealing the second face on its chest. All of them are slain by Raikou.
Kamaitachi & Yamanba (鎌鼬&山姥)
A pair of amphibian-like Horrors that possess the bodies of Sanuki no Miyatsukomaro (讃岐 造麿) and his wife, Kaguya's adoptive parents, as a consequence of the couple being consumed by greed over suitors offering their child treasure. The two Horrors act on their hosts' desires, using Kaguya to lure in her suitors so they can devour them devoured them afterwards. When exposed, the two Horrors combine into the fiery porcupine-like Horror Yamaoroshi (山颪) before being destroyed by Raikou, leaving Kaguya with no reason to remain on Earth anymore.
Kosode No Te (小袖の手)
A kimono specter-like Horror that possesses Kosode (小袖) due to her anger at the inequality of the caste system after she was beaten senseless after being falsely accused of theft for having picked up a bolt of expensive silk dropped by a noble woman. This Horror, as the name suggests, can shoot countless kimono to catch its prey. The Horror can also wrap anything with silk to consume them. Slain by Raikou.
Itsumaden (以津真天)
A fire-breathing winged-serpent Horror that first appeared during a plague, spreading mass destruction when it first appeared in the southern capital many years ago. Itsumaden possesses the body of a desperate person who refused to accept death and uses the host to cause an epidemic before being slain by Raikou.
Raijū (雷獣)
A golden lion Horror that was originally Seimei's mother Katsurakohime (葛子姫) who sacrifice her humanity by sealing countless Horrors inside her body when she and her husband Yasutake no Shidamaru (安武 信太丸) protected their daughter. Instead of being destroyed, Raijū is later sealed by Seimei within a large chariot-like Madō Tool.
Te No Me (手ノ目)
A Horror that appeared as a woman with very long arms and legs covered in tiny demonic eyes who attacked Watanabe no Tsuna (渡辺 綱) on a bridge. Later, using its severed arm, the Horror possessed Tsuna by using his guilt of having to abandon Raikou and his mother to death. Slain by Raikou.
Andon (闇呑)
A formless Horror that appear as a mass of blackness that sucked away light in its surroundings. Seems to be defeated by Raikou, but the Horror still alive and turn Raikou into mindless beast, until Seimei managed to seal the Horror within herself to regain the armor colour back, using the cursed seal that Douma places within her. Because of the seal's strength, not even Haruaki even is able to release it, leading Seimei to slowly become Rudra's vessel. The Horror later took form of Dark Seimei, and slain by Raikou.
Sōgoku (葬獄)
A hammer wielding oni-like Horror that possesses the body of Jihō (慈法), a Buddhist monk who feels the Michinaga clan's dependence on onmyōji is a vice against the true dharma of Buddhism. As a Horror, he can use his hammer to shrink anything it hits. Slain by Raikou when Sōgoku swallow tiny sized Raikou, before the latter transforms into Garo inside its belly.
Kappa (喝破)
A Horror that possesses the body of Fujiwara no Narimichi (藤原 成通). This Horror uses a kemari ball to consume its victim. Slain by Yasusuke.
Butterfly Horror
A Horror that possesses the body of Kamo no Yasunori. This Horror is able to fly, shoot a fireball from its mouth, use the proboscis in its forehead like a blade and spread pollen that is able to consume humans. Slain by both Yasusuke and Raikou.
Mask Horror
A Horror that possesses the body of Minamoto no Tōru (源 融). This Horror (in human form) consumes good-looking humans by kissing them, maintaining its youthful appearance. In Horror form, it is able to use countless mask projections to fire an energy beam. It could transform his arm into single blade to attack. Slain by Raikou.
One-Eyed Horror
A Horror that possesses the body of Tachibana Masamune's wife through her anger at her husband's constant infidelity. It is able to sprout a fleshy bud that can mimic the face and voice of a woman in a man's heart, for example, Seimei to Raikou. Slain by Raikou.
Dual-Bladed Horror
A Horror that possesses the body of Shijō Kintō through his ambition to protect the Light Palace, later to kill Michinaga and claim the palace by himself. It is relatively strong, even able to regenerate its limbs once slashed by Yasusuke (due to the Crimson Moon), although the latter finally manages to slay him.
Whip Horror
A Horror that possesses the body of an aristocrat. As its name suggests, it could use several whips to attack the enemy. Slain by Raikou after it manages to battle with Seimei for a short period.
Rudra (嶐鑼, Rudora)
An ancient giant Horror with great power that was sealed by the Makai Order ages ago with the Crimson Moon. After Priest Douma is betrayed by Ashiya Douman, Rudra takes control of its vessel, Seimei, as it slowly awakens and starts breaking the Crimson Moon's seal. Rudra awakens fully after a botched attempt to transfer its vessel from Seimei to Haruaki. It takes the form of a gigantic Horror with three faces on its head and 12 in its hands. It is immensely powerful, able to cast various forms of red-colored energy to kill humans. It is also able to draw others into its inner darkness by surrounding itself in a giant lotus. Rudra is defeated after Raikou assumes the Winged Garo state, weakening it to allow Kaguya and Seimei to seal it within the moon once more.
Shuten-dōji (酒呑童子)
Horrors that possess the bodies of abandoned children of the village at the foot of Mount Ooe. These Horrors consume pregnant women. Slain by Tokiwaka.
Hitōban (飛頭蛮)
A Horror that possesses a corpse of a woman recently slain by Tokimaru. This Horror possesses a strong jaw, a long neck and able to breathe fire from its mouth. It could also call several Inga Horrors. Slain by Raikou.
Usuzumizakura (薄墨桜)
The antagonist of Usuzumizakura: Garo, Usuzumizakura is a Horror containing Sugawara no Michizane (菅原 道真)'s curse. Originally, this Horror was a normal sakura tree under the great care of Michizane. However, after his exile to Dazaifu, this tree withered until a loyal servant of Michizane place a Haniwa (埴輪) reminiscent of Michizane to make it bloom again. After Michizane's demise, this tree becomes a Horror that inflicts curse to the whole Dazaifu area. This Horror initially defeated after a makai priest sacrifices his life to make a spear that sealed the Horror. But after consuming Tokimaru, the seal starts to weaken. The Horror finally manifested completely after using the Haniwa, which contains Michizane's soul as the gate. Upon completion, this Horror transformed into a giant insect-like Horror with numerous, sakura-laced wings. This Horror could summon blood-colored thunders and using the sakura petals it carries to either produce flames or summoning Dogu-like Horrors to slain adversaries and feeds on human souls. After fusing with Akira, the Horror evolved. Now incorporating a gigantic, demonized version of Akira on it and able to breathe white-fire from its mouth. This Horror is finally slain for good with the joint effort of Raikou, Yasusuke, and the spear recharged by Seimei, Kintoki, and Yorinobu.

== Vanishing Line ==
=== Main characters ===
Sword (ソード, Sōdo)
Voiced by: Tomokazu Seki (Japanese); T. Axelrod (English)
Twenty-nine-year-old Sword, real name Wilhelm Ragnvald (ヴィルヘルム・ランバルト, Viruherumu Ranbaruto), is the holder of the title of Garo the Golden Knight in Garo: Vanishing Line. He is a straightforward and happy-go-lucky, yet well-meaning man often described by others as an idiot due to his shoot-first-ask-questions-later attitude when dealing with Horrors. Despite actually being rather intelligent and perceptive, Sword is also reckless and impatient, which unfortunately ends up reinforcing his "idiot" image. He is also something of a pervert, solemnly giving thanks whenever he is pleased by the sight of a woman's breasts, and is easily distracted by beautiful women. Befitting his large, muscular frame, he has a seemingly bottomless appetite. His favorite meal is a large cut of steak with an equally heaping plate of French fries, and he is often seen at his favorite diner when not on a mission. Sword dresses practically and lives in a run-down apartment, in contrast to his other prominent Makai associates who are shown having more refined and expensive tastes. The apartment, as well as the Chinese restaurant it is located above, is owned by Fei Long, who allows him to stay rent-free under the condition that he makes breakfast for the staff every morning. Unlike most Makai Knights and ironically, given his nickname, Sword prefers using his fists over his blade unless the situation deems otherwise. Despite belonging to the secretive Makai Order, he cares little for maintaining secrecy or minimizing collateral damage, openly battling Horrors in highly visible and destructive ways regardless of his surroundings. He is searching for the meaning behind the phrase "El Dorado" and elects to remain in Russell City and hunt Horrors until the mystery is solved. Initially dismissive of Sophie despite her insistent nature in face of the dangers they face every day, Sword eventually warms up to her when she reveals her resourcefulness and spirit, finding that she reminds him of his own late little sister Lizzy. Sword eventually, albeit somewhat reluctantly, decides to allow Sophie to help with Horror hunting, finding her knack for gathering information on the internet useful. Both Sword and Lizzy were left orphaned many years ago when their father Edward Ragnvald (エドワード・ランバルト, Edowādo Ranbaruto), presumably the previous Golden Knight, died. One year after the El Dorado crisis, Sword is shown to be alive and well despite his fate being unclear after his final battle with Knight. Despite Gina's claims that he is far away on a mission on his own, it is quickly revealed that he was simply in the diner's bathroom after being coerced into trying an experimental recipe, awkwardly meeting Sophie again after a year apart.
Sword's Garo armor differs from the armor's traditional form thanks to improvements made by Alchemists of Makai Order as with other Makai Armors, giving its current heavy and mechanical in appearance, featuring two trailing tassels ending in sharp blades (homage to original series version's grappling hook). The armor also glows with bright purple/pink accents at times and has reddish-pink eyes whenever Sword charges it with his ki. After merging with Zaruba following his sacrificial attack on Knight, the armor attains an upgraded form which sports a larger, fiercer appearance, neon glow that has turned bright gold and is significantly more powerful. When armored, Sword's already bulky custom motorcycle transforms with him, attaining combat chassis implied to be reforged out of Gōten (it grants Sword the ability to turn his Garouken into the larger Garou Zanbaken (牙狼斬馬剣, Garō Zanbaken; Fanged-Wolf Horse-Slaying Sword) in the same vein with the Madō Horse) that made it even bulkier and featuring a giant recreation of Zaruba's face on the front as well as several weapons, such as skeletal arms, at the sides. When Zaruba is resurrected in a new motorcycle form, the armored form appears more like a dragon, with better overall performance than the original bike. Like the new Garo armor, the new bike blazes with golden Madō Fire and can further empower Sword. Despite the bike's size and weight, it is supernaturally nimble and fast. Unlike conventional vehicles, the motorcycle runs on Madō Fire instead of gasoline. Sword's Garouken in its normal form has since revamped into its current, large collapsible blade form.
Sophia Heness (ソフィア・ヘネス, Sofia Henesu)
Voiced by: Rie Kugimiya (Japanese); Madeleine Morris (English)
Sophia Heness, nicknamed "Sophie" (ソフィ, Sofi), is a thirteen-year-old girl searching for her missing older brother Martin, with the phrase "El Dorado" being her only clue. She encounters Sword after the fortune-teller Moon Wizard is revealed to be a Horror and enlists his help in the belief that a Horror is behind Martin's disappearance. Sophie lives at a religious group home under the supervision of a strict nun, who is frequently frustrated by Sophie's stubborn and independent nature, especially when it comes to searching for her brother. She is surprisingly insistent and resilient for someone her age, clinging to Sword despite being repeatedly dismissed by the Makai Knight, and the mortal dangers she constantly runs into due to sticking her nose into situations that are more than what she can handle. After Sister is killed, Fei Long's group takes Sophie in to protect her from Knight and the Horrors under El Dorado's control. Sophie is a frequent visitor to an online chat room, where she inquires about rumors of disappearances and other odd events, initially hoping to catch a lead on Martin's whereabouts. Her information-gathering skills become a useful asset for Sword, who reluctantly allows her to start helping him hunt Horrors by looking into potential cases. After meeting with the spirit of the Land of Guidance, Gina gives Sophie the pink gemstone she received from the trial, said to be a protective charm, which can only be used if the holder has a strong and focused will. Later, she is forced into the Eldo Net system and is reunited with her brother, who is ignorant of the pain and suffering his actions have caused because of the Three Swords and King manipulating him. She soon learns that Martin gave her administrative privileges within the Eldo Net system and uses that access to shut Eldo Net down for good, freeing the souls trapped within. After the El Dorado crisis is resolved, Luke reluctantly erases Sophie's memories of the entire ordeal, but she experiences vague flashes of memory over the next year and eventually her memories return fully because of the power of the charm Gina gave her. She quickly returns to the diner and finds Gina, declaring her intention to become a Makai Alchemist to protect people from having to suffer what she went through and one day reunite with Sword. Despite vowing to meet Sword again after she has become a qualified Makai Alchemist, she awkwardly meets Sword again after he emerges from the bathroom when she is about to leave the diner.
As noted by Elder of Ferre Salé Dessimo (フェレ・サレ・デシモ, Fere Sare Deshimo), the reason why El Dorado specifically after Sophie beside her ties with her brother Martin was because she was born under a peculiar star and therefore has the power to turn the tide of the fight against the darkness, which may very well alluding her later ability to access and ultimately, delete Eldo Net in addition of the potential as one of the most formidable Makai Alchemists.
Lukather Harden (ルカサー・ハーデン, Rukasā Hāden)
Voiced by: Nobunaga Shimazaki, Miyu Tomita (child) (Japanese); David Matranga, Erica Mendez (child) (English)
Eighteen-year-old Lukather Harden, nicknamed "Luke" (ルーク, Rūku), is a Makai Alchemist and Sword's reluctant partner. He is a stoic and serious individual who strongly believes the Makai Order should not involve itself with normal humans outside of hunting Horrors and should maintain the utmost secrecy, often outright ignoring any civilian addressing him. Because of his beliefs, he is easily annoyed by Sword's more outgoing behavior, finding the Makai Knight too unprofessional and too involved with the human world. However, he begrudgingly acknowledges Sword's strength and intuition. Luke is also fiercely independent and confident of his own skills and power, resulting in him hating to ask favors from anyone. Because he and Sword have conflicting viewpoints and attitudes, Luke dislikes working with the Golden Knight unless absolutely necessary and prefers working alone. Luke's parents were both renowned practitioners of Makai arts. His father Christopher was a Makai Knight while his mother Adelaide was a Makai Alchemist, and he trained diligently under the tutelage of his parents. While both his parents were strict mentors, his father was harsh and unforgiving with an obsession with personal strength, while his mother Adelaide was somewhat more gentle and encouraged Luke to gain strength to protect others. Luke initially idolized his father's strength and aspired to be like him, but turned away from the path of the Makai Knight and became a Makai Alchemist like his mother instead after Christopher turns to darkness and kills her. Luke lives in a sparsely furnished, yet high-class apartment, where he is often seen doing maintenance on his equipment. Despite giving up on the path of the Makai Knight, Luke kept his worn and tarnished training sword, which he places unceremoniously in the corner of his living room. He is armed with various tools and weapons, most notably the twin revolvers that once belonged to his mother and a sniper rifle that fire mystical bullets of different uses, a grappling line, and a Horror-tracking bracelet. Unlike most other Makai Alchemists seen in the franchise, Luke is fully capable of slaying Horrors on his own thanks to a combination of his childhood training and arsenal, only resorting to help from Sword when requiring tactical assistance. He holds immense hatred for his father, now Knight of the Three Swords of El Dorado, to the point that his normally stoic demeanor cracks and he flies into a blind rage during their first battle. Seeing the suffering caused by the destruction from Sword and Knight's first battle reminds Luke of his mother's last words to him: that strength exists to protect others, not for one's own gain. Luke then realizes that his attitude up to that point has been dangerously similar to his father's. He swears from then on to honor his mother's memory by becoming a better protector, asking Mei Fang to give him a black eye as a reminder, before leaving Russell City for his next mission. In his travels westward to catch up to Sword, Gina, and Sophie, Luke's personality softens somewhat. Despite still being fairly stoic and serious, he generally behaves in a more friendly, open manner around the people he now recognizes as friends. Luke also becomes more calm and collected after his training in Land of Guidance. While still unable to forgive his father for what the Dark Knight had done, he later elects to honor his childhood training and begin using blades again, arming himself with a collapsible chokuto presumably obtained from the Land of Guidance. One year after the El Dorado crisis, Luke journeys alone to complete his Makai Knight training, gaining the silver Zelos (ゼロス, Zerosu) armor that glows with greenish accents and wielding two swords.
Gina Evans (ジーナ・エヴァンズ, Jīna Evanzu)
Voiced by: Ami Koshimizu (Japanese); Trina Nishimura (English)
Twenty-three-year-old Gina Evans is a curvaceous and flirtatious Makai Alchemist with considerable skill in espionage and infiltration. She differs from most Makai Alchemists seen in the series in that much of her equipment is modern in design, ranging from a high-tech DNA-scanning device to a highly customized muscle car, which she uses as her main mode of transportation. She also possesses a number of vials of mystic liquid, which produce various effects when broken. Her weapon of choice is a magic bow, and when in her muscle car, she prefers using a Makai gatling gun. She and Sword have a history and she seemingly enjoys annoying him, which is a result of romantic feelings. Gina is well aware that men find her alluring and is not above using their infatuation to her advantage, shamelessly flirting with men to gain everything from information to money to pay for her equipment. She is also more than capable of taking on Horrors on her own using a combination of her quick wit and versatile arsenal. One year after King's defeat and the destruction of El Dorado, Gina takes on Sophie as an apprentice after her memories are restored.

=== Supporting characters ===
Waitress Chiaki (ウェイトレス・チアキ, Weitoresu Chiaki)
Voiced by: Chiaki Takahashi (Japanese); Felecia Angelle (English)
A busty and cheerful waitress at Sword's favorite diner, Chiaki provides Russell City's Makai practitioners not only with food, but with orders and information from "the boss" in the form of a bill. Despite her normally sunny and cheerful attitude, when Horror-related matters are involved she adopts a formal, subdued demeanor. Beings identical to Chiaki also staff gas stations dotted throughout the region, providing Madō Fire fuel for Makai vehicles such as Sword's motorcycle.
Fei Long (フェイロン, Feiron)
Voiced by: Takaya Hashi (Japanese); Vic Mignogna (English)
Fei Long is a retired Makai Alchemist and owner of the Chinese restaurant where Sword makes breakfast for the staff every morning. He was once the previous Garo's partner. Despite having retired from active duty, he is still involved with Makai affairs and backs up the Horror slayers on active duty alongside his restaurant's staff, who are all trained to some degree in the Makai arts. He and Sword share a casual friendship despite Fei Long's age and experience ordinarily demanding respect and formality.
Mei Fang (メイファン, Meifan)
Voiced by: Ayahi Takagaki (Japanese); Apphia Yu (English)
Mei Fang is Fei Long's granddaughter, an apprentice Makai Alchemist and employee at the Chinese restaurant where Sword works during the day. Sword tasks her with getting him out of bed each morning, as he often fails to wake up to his alarm clock. Mei Fang later acts as Luke's caretaker as he recovers from his first battle with Knight, developing feelings for him in the process. She speaks with a thick accent. She is entrusted with the key to Luke's apartment while he is away on his personal journey.
Mia (ミア)
Voiced by: Yūka Misaki (Japanese); Natalie Hoover (English)
Mia is a Demon World beast resembling a flying squirrel that accompanies Gina, residing in her cleavage. It apparently holds some distaste for Sword and frequently attacks him by attaching itself to his face whenever he gets too lecherous around Gina. When Sword, Gina, and Sophie visit the Land of Guidance, the temple's spirit temporarily possesses Mia to address them. It is later shown to have some degree of combat ability, with the power to create magical barriers. It makes vocalizations that resemble its name.
Sister (シスター, Shisutā)
Voiced by: Atsuko Tanaka (Japanese); Carli Mosier (English)
Sister is a nun who runs the Catherine Home (カタリナホーム, Katarina Hōmu), the religious group home where Sophie lives alongside other orphaned children. Sister is stern but caring, frequently frustrated by Sophie's stubborn and independent nature, especially when it comes to finding Martin, but is reluctant to chide her knowing how much Martin means to her. Sister is highly skilled in various martial arts, and is often seen teaching judo to Sophie. She is severely wounded by Pawn when the Horror attempts to kill and consume the residents of the Catherine Home, and later killed by Knight in her last attempt to tell Sophie to run away.
Martin Heness (マーティン・ヘネス, Mātin Henesu)
Voiced by: Romi Park (Japanese); Matt Shipman (English)
Martin Heness is Sophie's missing older brother, who disappeared under mysterious circumstances with only the phrase "El Dorado" as a clue to his possible whereabouts. Initially, Martin is implied to be good with computers and taught Sophie some of his skills, and it is later revealed his skills with computers are prodigious, even developing his own prototype system allowing users to directly interface with networks without use of invasive procedures such as brain implants--the reason the Three Swords seek him out in the first place. Martin is later revealed to be the mysterious El Dorado King who sought out Sophie in the first place, managing the "true" El Dorado, a virtual reality paradise that he claims he helped develop. He see himself as little more than a more highly ranked web developer and believes everyone to be making him up to be a bigger deal than he actually is out of some emotions he cannot quite pinpoint, not knowing that his title as King has deeper implications, and that the Three Swords are annoyed by the fact that he lacks inner darkness. Though he has been missing for three years, Martin believes only six months have passed since he left Sophie, as he spent most of his time inside the virtual reality he created than in the real world. To keep him focused on the project, he has been given forged letters and gifts signed with Sophie's name, presenting an illusion that he was still keeping in touch with his sister. After he was forcefully shown of the atrocities he helped wrecked by Sophie, it is soon revealed that Martin is being manipulated by the true King, a powerful and ancient Horror, and his Three Swords, who influenced him to create El Dorado's Eldo Net and gave him the legendary ring that allows one to control Horrors, and that Sophie was brought to El Dorado just so that he could be broken for possession. He believes the ring is the administrator's controller for the Eldo Net system, meaning he has been unwittingly causing every Horror attack in the region since his disappearance. Martin is totally unaware of the massive death toll that has ensued since he first brought the "true" El Dorado online, believing the over 10,000 souls trapped within are willing volunteers. He suffers a devastating a mental breakdown being overwhelmed by despair, allowing the True King to finally possess him and complete the system.
Anne (アンヌ, An'nu)
Voiced by: Chisa Horii (Japanese); Camille Monae (English)
Anne is Sophie's roommate at the Catherine Home, an African-American girl with an upbeat personality.
Adelaide Harden (アデレード・ハーデン, Aderēdo Hāden)
Voiced by: Ryoko Gi (Japanese); Janelle Lutz (English)
Adelaide Harden is Luke's late mother and a Native American Makai Alchemist who wielded the twin revolvers that Luke now uses as his primary weapons. In contrast to his stern father, she was far gentler with her son, giving him praise and encouragement despite otherwise being strict. She was constantly annoyed at how harsh and unforgiving her husband was with her son's training, and how her son idolized her husband despite her being the more supportive parent. Her skills were of such caliber that she was quite renowned within the Makai community on her own, as well as being constantly by Christopher's side while he was out slaying Horrors. In the days leading to her death, she was aware of her husband's growing obsession with strength and reprimanded him firmly when he tried to use forbidden techniques to enhance his powers. She was eventually killed by Christopher when his obsession with strength reached a peak and he determined that his family was holding him back, being momentarily distracted by Luke calling her out and enabling her husband to deal the killing blow. In her dying moments, she entrusted her weapons to Luke and reminded him that strength existed to protect others, not for one's own gain.
Elizabeth Ragnvald (エリザベス・ランバルト, Erizabesu Ranbaruto)
Voiced by: Ayaka Ōhashi (Japanese); Cherami Leigh (English)
Elizabeth Ragnvald, nicknamed "Lizzy" (リジー, Rijī), is Sword's late younger sister, who died in a fire at her high school when the Cygnusram-Tech laboratory next door mysteriously exploded, later revealed to be because of the Horror known as King battling Makai Knights. Upon her death, her spirit was digitized into the Eldo Net system and exists imprisoned within the virtual "true" El Dorado Eldo Net. Unlike others who were swiftly integrated and subjugated, her Makai lineage enabled her to resist subjugation and she continued to exist as an independent being. She eventually reunites with Sword and gives him information about the city's true nature, encouraging him to destroy it before it is fully completed. She later assists Sword's group by informing them of how to free the souls stored within Eldo Net. After assisting Sophie with shutting down the system, Lizzy's soul is freed, allowing her to finally be at peace.
Garm (ガルム, Garumu)
Voiced by: Mayu Udono (Japanese); Tia Ballard (English)
The Watchdog of Russell City and the same Garm who operated in the Valiante Kingdom many years ago, Garm is revealed late in the series to be the "boss" Waitress Chiaki often refers to, having made her Watchdog Center into a publicly accessible diner presumably to alleviate her ever-present boredom. She is the one who initially gives Sword the information about El Dorado while consoling him over Lizzy's death and frequently uses the Golden Knight as a test subject for new recipes. Over the years, Garm seems to have developed a kinder and friendlier personality, evidenced by giving Sophie a personalized dessert on the house in congratulation for becoming Gina's apprentice.

=== Antagonists ===
Knight (ナイト, Naito)
Voiced by: Daisuke Namikawa (Japanese); Ricco Fajardo (English)
Once Luke's father, a Makai Knight named Christopher Harden (クリストフェル・ハーデン, Kurisutoferu Hāden) with the title of Bolg the Howling Knight (震鳴騎士・ボルグ, Shinmei Kishi Borugu) once revered as the strongest Silver Knight (白銀騎士, Hakugin Kishi), (Note: The word "hakugin" (白銀) can alternately be read as "shirogane" (白銀) which also means "silver.") Knight is now one of the Three Swords (三剣, Sanken) of El Dorado with the title of Dark Knight (暗黒騎士, Ankoku Kishi). He is seen to be a stern and serious man who values strength above all else, to the point that he claims gaining strength is his only reason for living. He attempted to train Luke to inherit his title when Luke was young. Christopher gained reverence for being a powerful Knight who often single-handedly defeated powerful Horrors despite him only doing so in an attempt to quench his thirst for strong opponents to fight. He claims to have been attracted to Adelaide due to her headstrong attitude, but gradually and eventually came to see his family as an obstacle in his quest of obtaining true strength. This resulted in him finally confronting his wife one night to be rid of what he deemed to be his first obstacle to true strength, turning to darkness and killing her. Having witnessed the confrontation between his parents, which ended up burning down his family's home, Luke ultimately turned away from the path of a Makai Knight and become a Makai Alchemist instead. Knight's superior, the mysterious King of El Dorado, tasks him with retrieving Sophie and bringing her to El Dorado for reasons unknown. Knight is indiscreet, unsociable and utterly ruthless; anyone he deems "in his way" is slaughtered regardless of who they are. His disregard for others is such that he does not hesitate to cause massive collateral damage during his first battle with Sword, resulting in one high-rise building being toppled after another, killing dozens and injuring many more in one single night. His obsession with strength has completely consumed him, motivating him to seek out worthy opponents to battle against and believing that the weak deserve to be wiped out. He sees the Makai Knights, particularly Sword, as not living up to their full potential because they gain strength for the sake of others rather than simply gaining strength for strength's sake. During the battle against King, Knight faces off with and soundly defeats Luke, but leaves before he can strike a final blow to confront Sword in the Eldo Net system. He is finally struck down in a fierce battle with the Golden Knight, declaring that he had fun before fading away for good.
As the Dark Knight, Knight dons heavy black armor with glowing red accents. His helmet's faceplate is retractable, revealing a grimacing skull. Both in and out of his armored form, Knight has access to incredibly destructive dark power, so much so that he can cause immense explosions by just hitting the ground with his blade, and later is shown to take down an entire high-rise building effortlessly in armored form. His strength has grown to such extent that he claims to have forgotten the sensation of pain until his first battle with Sword. As Bolg, Christopher donned silver armor that glowed with blue accents, similar in design to the armor he now wears as the Dark Knight. Knight wields a collapsible bisento that serves as a focus for his dark magic, the same weapon he wielded as Bolg. Within the Eldo Net system, he possesses a black and red Madō Motorcycle similar in design to Sword's.
Queen (クイーン, Kuīn)
Voiced by: Romi Park (Japanese); Monica Rial (English)
Queen is one of the Three Swords of El Dorado, a fallen Makai Alchemist who holds absolute loyalty and devotion towards King, feverishly vowing to destroy anyone who dares to challenge his will or sully his image and seeing no one as worthy enough to even stand in his presence. As such, she despises Sophie despite King's orders to retrieve her because she causes him "trouble." Queen is able to control carnivorous Demon World plants, which she uses to snare and consume her enemies. She is also incredibly dexterous, able to fight with her feet just as well as her hands, possessing talon-like appendages where normal feet would be. Within the Eldo Net's virtual "true" El Dorado, Queen appears as "Ms. Queen," Martin Heness' loyal secretary. Her ability to control plants also becomes the power to manipulate electronic cables. She is initially slain by both Gina and Luke, but Bishop revives her, only or her to be defeated by the pair again. Bishop revives her once more, giving her a Horror form that is eventually slain by Gina for good.
Bishop (ビショップ, Bishoppu)
Voiced by: Kenyu Horiuchi (Japanese); David Wald (English)
Bishop is one of the Three Swords of El Dorado and the one who oversees the city's day-to-day activities. He possesses the ability to become shadow to instantly teleport himself and has access to powerful dark magics, such as magically activating planted Madō bombs as demonstrated through destroying Sun Dell Diós. In contrast to the stern and serious Knight and Queen, he is carefree and rather shrewd. Unlike both his colleagues who are, for most part, mindful of their duties and get along well professionally, he enjoys annoying his colleagues and playing mind games instead. He is yet to be seen doing battle with anyone, preferring to manipulate events behind the scenes and have others do the dirty work. While Queen displays true loyalty to King and Knight is allied with King solely to gain yet more strength, Bishop is shown to only follow King's orders because he is forced to, so his true motives and goals are unknown. One year after King's defeat, Bishop is still at large as the only surviving member of the Three Swords, planning for the "fun" he will be able to have now that he is free from King's servitude.
Doctor Stanley (ドクター・スタンリー, Dokutā Sutanrī)
Voiced by: Shinya Fukumatsu (Japanese); Kent Williams (English)
Doctor Stanley is Bishop's servant and a former Makai Alchemist who was exiled for experimenting on at least ten humans. Said experiments apparently reduced his body into its current infant-like state, he has the body of an infant, which he hides in a robotic full body suit to compensate his handicapped physical abilities. He aided El Dorado with several technological and alchemical breakthroughs, including giving the city's Horror residents the ability to exist in the daylight. He pledged loyalty to Bishop, and in extension, to King and the Three Swords, due to Bishop recognizing and acknowledging his genius mind, as well as allowing him free rein to work on his experiments to his heart's content, ignorant of the fact that Bishop himself sees the doctor as little more than just a convenient tool. He is soon used as a suicide bomber by Bishop in a plan to weaken Sword and separate him from Sophie.
King (キング, Kingu)
Voiced by: Ryūsei Nakao (Japanese); Daman Mills (English)
King is the true leader of El Dorado, an ancient and powerful Horror. He is said to be a powerful being who created an enchanted ring that gives the wearer the ability to command Horrors. He sees humanity as little more than vermin and food source, and has desired to totally subjugate humanity since ancient times in a bid to achieve "true and eternal" peace. After his last form was destroyed, King's power and consciousness resides in the ring he created. After the prodigious Martin Heness was recruited into creating the "true" El Dorado, the title of King was tentatively held by Martin Heness himself, seemingly and unwittingly manipulated by the powerful and ancient Horror that planned the creation of both the real city of El Dorado and the virtual reality world of Eldo Net, the "true" El Dorado. While the Three Swords are annoyed by the fact that Martin Heness lacks inner darkness, preventing the true King from possessing him, the true King himself is indifferent and asked for Sophie to be sent to El Dorado when the system is nearing completion instead. After King taunts Martin to accept darkness and desire after he suffers a devastating mental breakdown, King consumes Martin and reveals his true form. King's true form is shown to be a fairly small humanoid covered in reddish-white energy, with head akin of a horned lizard. In this form, King is able to manipulate dark energies to create barriers and spheres of destruction and telepathically connect with his Three Swords. Later, Sword and Zaruba enter Eldo Net and face King. King manages to swallow both of them and coerce them to give up, but Sword resists using his willpower and slays King once and for all.

=== Horrors ===
Cervielle (セルヴィエル, Seruvieru)
A Horror that targets women. This Horror is slain by Sword while chasing its target.
Obsessian (オブセシアン, Obuseshian)
A Horror that possesses the body of Ricardo (リカルド, Rikarudo), a reclusive fortune-teller known as Moon Wizard (ムーン・ウィザード, Mūn Wizādo) who is revered in Russell City's underground for his eerily accurate predictions. The Horror is responsible for the disappearance of 17 women in Russell City and has a preference for red-haired women, keeping a large collection of red-haired dolls in his dwelling. Obsessian is slain by Sword after a very showy and destructive battle that ends in the near-destruction of a bridge when a gas tanker explodes.
Begand (ビーガンド, Bīgando)
A Horror that possesses the body of Hardy (ハーディ, Hādi), a former multiple-time Olympic gold medalist sprinter who was paralyzed in an accident when he pushed his girlfriend Enith (エニス, Enisu) out of the way of a falling sign. The Horror is exceptionally fast and hard to track, even for Sword's Madō Motorcycle, sending Sword and Luke on a mad chase across the city until it is finally taken down by a combination of well-placed shots from Luke's rifle and a single swing of Garo's sword. Because of Luke's memory-erasing rain, Enith believes Hardy to be missing.
Aggregate (アグリゲート, Agurigēto)
A Horror that possesses a personal computer owned by mob boss Damian Steward (ダミアン・スチュワード, Damian Suchuwādo), offering any information he desires in return for humans to feed on. Damian uses the Horror's abilities to quickly rise to the top of Russell City's criminal underworld, making enemies with and eventually eliminating other crime family bosses until Gina and Sword infiltrate his penthouse and slay the Horror during a party. Damian, despite being saved from the Horror, is later shot dead by members of the other families in a revenge killing.
Rangrien (ラングリエン, Rangurien)
Once Marie Ripley (マリー・リプリー, Marī Ripurī), the younger sister of priest Father Thomas Ripley (トーマス・リプリー神父, Tōmasu Ripurī-shinpu), this Horror takes hold of its host after she is imprisoned and tortured by her brother, who is strongly implied to have had incestuous feelings for her and began his abuse after a potential suitor gave her a bouquet. The Horror is defeated by a combination of Sophie dropping a church bell on it and a single stroke of Garo's blade. Curiously unlike other Horrors who actively seek humans to feed, she hardly ventured outside her own place and had never been known to have consumed anyone other than her brother.
Surabhi (スラビー, Surabī)
A Horror that possesses the body of Lady Viola (レディ・ヴィオラ, Redi Viora), a former actress who summons a Horror in the hopes of binding it to a ring and using it to further her career. She starts an etiquette and behavior school for upper-class children, using their parents' selfishness and apathy to freely feed on the children's souls until Sword, Gina, and Sophie infiltrate the operation, posing as a family, and slay the Horror and its cat familiars. She had always believed herself to be a human capable of controlling Horrors since her possession, until the lie was exposed and it was revealed to her that she herself was the Horror.
Unonbera (ウノンベラ)
Taking the form of a movie theater, this Horror shows whoever is sitting in seat L-13 a vivid, happy, and potentially modified ideal memory of their past before taking them to a fleshy room and consuming them at the peak of contentment. Luke almost falls victim to its illusions, but Sword is able to snap him out of it and they slay the Horror together.
Pawn (ポーン, Pōn)
Bishop's servant, this Horror takes the form of a cheerful businessman who invites people to "find happiness in El Dorado," kidnapping people and shipping them out of the city for various purposes. However, he has a bad habit of being unable to control his hunger, resulting in him often consuming his targets prematurely, or people he should be recruiting instead of consuming, earning Knight's ire. Pawn is slain by Knight for attempting to kill and consume Sister and the children at Sophie's group home against Knight's plans.
Germa (ゲルマ, Geruma)
A Horror that possesses the body of an unnamed office worker. This Horror is slain by Luke.
Aggrega (アグレガ, Agurega)
A pack of Horrors that was slain by Christopher and Adelaide.
Alfil (アルフィル, Arufiru)
Bishop's servant, this Horror takes the form of a local sheriff who gave order to a bar owner in Sun Dell Diós named Natalia (ナタリア, Nataria) to capture Sword, under accusation of kidnapping Sophie. He also ordered Natalia to send Sophie back "home" (actually to El Dorado), under the command of Bishop. This Horror could extend his arm. He is later slain by Sword. And Natalia agreed to clear Sword's name.
Rastapanje (ラスタパンジェ, Rasutapanje)
Taking form of masses of liquid that consumes people by dissolving them. A motel owner named Matthew (マシュー, Mashū) discovers this Horror and makes use of it to dissolve his motel guests and take whatever material possessions they have with them. After Matthew himself gets consumed, the Horror turns gigantic and become humanoid before being slain by joint effort of Gina and Sword. Gina later rewrote Matthew's wife Sarah (サラ, Sara) and son George (ジョージ, Jōji)'s memory, both now believed that a tornado hit their motel and killed Matthew in the process.
Namless (ナムレス, Namuresu)
A Horror that possesses the body of an unnamed leader of a group of Makai Knights who were slaughtered by a Horror attack. The Horror was sealed in a cave near a coastal village, but the seal was near breaking upon Luke's arrival and would break entirely at the next full moon. The Horror takes the form of a corrupted suit of armor and possesses its hosts swordsmanship. Inheriting the will of the Horror's former comrades, Luke slays the Horror, finally putting the spirits of the group of Makai Knights to rest.
Bezel (ベゼル, Bezeru)
A Horror that takes the form of a young man with silver hair and a scarred left eye. The Horror possesses a keen sense of smell, to the extent that he is capable of literally capable of smelling intents and feelings of others. He finds the "scent" of happiness detestable while enjoying that of greed and turmoil the most. It also possesses the ability to change human faces into its own, transforming human bodies into clones that it can absorb or split off from itself to fight for it. The Horror's true form is a large armored beast with fangs and sharp claws. Its arrogance and confidence in its own strength led it to El Dorado, where it went around asking the whereabouts of King with impunity, wishing to usurp King as the city's ruler as it sees him to be weak and ineffectual. Despite its strength however, it is swiftly beaten in a confrontation with Queen and is later slain by Knight.
Hemrio (ヘムリオ, Hemurio)
A Horror that supervises Club Vera. This Horror is slain by Bezel.
Monster Truck Horrors
A pack of vehicular Horrors that was created by Stanley, under Bishop's orders to capture Sophie. Unlike typical Horrors that can only operate in full power at night, these Horrors are part machine and lacking self-consciousness, and as such, are able to perform at full capacity even in daylight. These Horrors were massive and could shoot projectiles to destroy the enemy. All of them were slain by joint efforts of Sword with Zaruba (as Madō Motorcycle).
Sismis (シスミス, Shisumisu)
A pack of Horrors that was created by Stanley, under Bishop's orders to capture Sophie. A red variant of this Horror could make barrier to make them immune to sunlight. These Horrors could shoot projectiles at high speed to destroy the enemy. The grunt Horrors were slain by joint efforts of Sophie, Gina and Luke, while Luke is the one who slew the red winged Horror.
Solkan (ソルカン, Sorukan)
A Horror that has nine heads, under Bishop's orders to capture Sophie. This Horror is slain by joint efforts of Sword, Luke and Gina.
Norma (ノルマ, Noruma)
Horrors that act as El Dorado's special forces team. These Horrors were sent to kill Alan (アラン, Aran), a fugitive former GarEden employee who knows the truth of El Dorado, but all of them were slain by joint efforts of Luke and Sword.
Red Gargoyle Horrors
Horrors that were created from El Dorado residents. These Horrors can only materialize themselves after hearing a special soundwave created by Bishop. Some of these Horrors was slain by joint efforts of Luke and Gina, and some of them was slain by a newly revived Zaruba as well.
Gigantic Eel Horrors
Horrors that were presumably created from souls inside Eldo Net. These Horrors act as security system should the Makai Knight materializing his armor inside Eldo Net. Six of these Horrors were slain by Sword and the rest of them was destroyed following the shut down of Eldo Net.
