= Convenience Store Boy Friends =

Light novel and anime series

- Convenience Store Boy Friends key visual

コンビニカレシ (Konbini Kareshi)
- Genre: Romance, slice of life
- Light novel
- Written by: Tsukuba
- Illustrated by: Makoto Sensaki
- Published by: Kadokawa
- Imprint: Enterbrain Mook
- Original run: May 2015 – September 2017
- Volumes: 4
- Anime television series
- Directed by: Hayato Date
- Written by: Sayaka Harada
- Music by: Hanae Nakamura; Natsumi Tabuchi; Takashi Ōmama
- Studio: Pierrot (Note: Production assistance (制作協力) for all episodes provided by Pierrot+.)
- Licensed by: Crunchyroll
- Original network: TBS, BS-TBS, TBS Channel 1
- Original run: July 6, 2017 – September 28, 2017
- Episodes: 12

Convenience Store Boy Friends (コンビニカレシ, Konbini Kareshi) is a Japanese multimedia project developed by Kadokawa's B's Log Comic magazine with collaboration by Lawson. The project started in 2015 and has already released mooks and bundles with drama CDs. It centers around a group of male high school students who always stop at a convenience store on their way home from school. An anime television series adaptation animated by Pierrot and directed by Hayato Date aired from July 6 to September 28, 2017, on TBS.

== Synopsis ==
The series tells the story of the boys falling in love and follows each of the students on their every day journey as they explore the sentiments and feelings of love right up until the moment they confess it to their chosen ones.

== Characters ==
=== Male characters ===
Haruki Mishima (三島 春来, Mishima Haruki)
Voiced by: Takuma Terashima (Japanese); Justin Briner (English)
Haruki is a high school freshman and swimming club member. In kindergarten, a girl read him a fairy tale and gave him the book. Haruki later found out the girl is Mashiki Misora, the twin sister of Mashiki Miharu. But, he still falls in love with Miharu. He reunited with Miharu at the convenience store near the high school.
Towa Honda (本田 塔羽, Honda Towa)
Voiced by: Kenichi Suzumura (Japanese); Ricco Fajardo (English)
An easy going friend of Haruki, Towa is a high school freshman who joined the soccer club who often sleeps over at Haruki's house. He becomes interested in his class representative, Mami Mihashi, after finding out she likes cute things and shojo manga, just like him.
Mikado Nakajima (中島 帝, Nakajima Mikado)
Voiced by: Shinnosuke Tachibana (Japanese); Dave Trosko (English)
The student council president in love with his step-sister Waka Kisaki.
Nasa Sanagi (佐名木 凪瑳, Sanagi Nasa)
Voiced by: Yuki Kaji (Japanese); Parker Gray (English)
He is in the cooking society and a talented chef.
Natsu Asumi (明日海 夏, Asumi Natsu)
Voiced by: Hiroshi Kamiya (Japanese); Garret Storms (English)
He is in the Track & Field Club and loves running more than anything else.
Masamune Sakurakouji (櫻小路 正宗, Sakurakōji Masamune)
Voiced by: Takahiro Sakurai (Japanese); David Wald (English)
The student council vice-president who is a good friend of Mikado Nakajima.

=== Female characters ===
Miharu Mashiki (真四季 みはる, Mashiki Miharu)
Voiced by: Sayaka Kanda (Japanese); Sarah Wiedenheft (English)
She is in love with Haruki Mishima. She has a very weak heart. Her twin sister, Misora, who died when she was little from the same disease.
Mami Mihashi (三橋 真珠, Mihashi Mami)
Voiced by: Rie Kugimiya (Japanese); Felecia Angelle (English)
The class representative in Towa's class. She likes to read shojo manga and is into cute things, but keep it a secret because she thinks it doesn't fit her. Lives in a very strict household.
Waka Kisaki (木崎 和架, Kisaki Waka)
Voiced by: Yukari Tamura (Japanese); Amber Lee Connors (English)
The step-sister of Mikado Nakajima.
Nozomi Itokawa (糸川 希未, Itokawa Nozomi)
Voiced by: Ami Koshimizu (Japanese); Morgan Berry (English)
She is in the cooking society.
Aki Asukai (飛鳥井 愛姫, Asukai Aki)
Voiced by: Yui Horie (Japanese); Bryn Apprill (English)
Kokona Minowa (弥後環 九, Minowa Kokona)
Voiced by: Miyuki Sawashiro
She is in the library committee and in love with Natsu Asumi.

== Media ==
=== Anime ===
An anime television series adaptation was announced on April 19, 2017, via the project's official Twitter account and premiered on TBS and other networks starting from July 6 to September 28, 2017. The anime is directed by Hayato Date at Pierrot. Satomi Ishikawa adapted Makoto Senzaki's original character designs into animation and Sayaka Harada is in charge of series composition. The opening theme titled "Stand Up Now" is performed by Cellchrome while the ending theme titled "Milestone" (マイルストーン, Mairusuton) is performed by ORANGE POST REASON. In addition to TBS, the show aired on BS-TBS and CS-TBS Channel 1. Crunchyroll garnered the streaming rights for worldwide viewing and Funimation licensed the series in North America for an English dub and home video release in August 2018.

==== Episodes ====
No.	Title	Original release date
1	"April"; Transliteration: "Uzuki" (Japanese: 卯月)	July 6, 2017
Haruki Mishima and Towa Honda are new students at Aokisora High School and best friends; at a convenience store near their high school, Haruki runs into his classmate Miharu Mashiki, a girl he's recognized since he was little.
2	"May"; Transliteration: "Satsuki" (Japanese: 皐月)	July 13, 2017
Disgusted by the irresponsible and talkative Towa, serious class representative Mami has been avoiding him; even when Mami begins avoiding him even more after a certain incident at the convenience store, Towa is undeterred.
3	"June"; Transliteration: "Minazuki" (Japanese: 水無月)	July 20, 2017
When Towa spots Miharu having a friendly conversation with their classmate Nasa Sanagi in the waiting room of a hospital, he decides to investigate Nasa's identity and his relationship with Miharu for the sake of his best friend Haruki.
4	"July"; Transliteration: "Fumizuki" (Japanese: 文月)	July 27, 2017
With the Sports Festival coming up, Haruki and Towa's classmates have high expectations for them as members of athletic clubs.
5	"August"; Transliteration: "Hazuki" (Japanese: 葉月)	August 3, 2017
After participating in the three-legged race with Mami, Towa believes they've grown closer; things don't go well when he asks her out on a date.
6	"September"; Transliteration: "Nagatsuki" (Japanese: 長月)	August 17, 2017
Summer vacation is over, and the Aozora Cultural Festival is approaching; after things went well with Mami at the fireworks display, Towa is delighted to be spending more time with her preparing for the festival.
7	"October"; Transliteration: "Kaminazuki" (Japanese: 神無月)	August 24, 2017
Haruki worries about Miharu's absence from the cultural festival; Haruki's class encourages Mikado's childhood friend Waka Kisaki to run in the student council elections.
8	"November"; Transliteration: "Shimotsuki" (Japanese: 霜月)	August 31, 2017
Towa and Mami are steadily growing closer, but they both have concerns about their families; Towa is having trouble with his relationship with his mother, and Mami remains unable to tell her family about her relationship with Towa.
9	"December"; Transliteration: "Shiwasu" (Japanese: 師走)	September 7, 2017
Towa and Mami seem to return each others feelings, but their concerns push them apart; worried about the couple, Mishima and Miharu put aside their own relationship to discuss if there's anything that can be done for them.
10	"January"; Transliteration: "Mutsuki" (Japanese: 睦月)	September 14, 2017
Haruki has been unable to focus during swim practcse since the new semester started; though his relationship with Miharu has returned to normal, he still feels as though something is lacking; Miharu begins missing school for some reason.
11	"February"; Transliteration: "Kisaragi" (Japanese: 如月)	September 21, 2017
Haruki has been concerned since Miharu went to the hospital and visits her every day; Towa and Mami are naturally worried about Miharu as well, but they're also concerned about Haruki.
12	"March"; Transliteration: "Yayoi" (Japanese: 弥生)	September 28, 2017
Miharu is scheduled to take time off from school and transfers to another hospital for surgery; she feels both anxious about the upcoming procedure and sad to be moving away from her friends.

== Reception ==
=== Previews ===
The anime series' first episode garnered a generally poor reception from Anime News Network's staff during the Summer 2017 season previews. Theron Martin criticized Hayato Date's direction for having long and uninspired shots, the multiple romantic storylines lacking a distinct charm and interesting characters, and Studio Pierrot's animation adding into the overall blandness. James Beckett saw it as a "run-of-the-mill teen romance", noting the mundane moments being performed by "blandly pleasant" characters with non-existent chemistry to viewers except the author writing them. Paul Jensen said that both the relationship dynamics and comedy concepts looked good on paper but were hampered by "stiff and clumsy" writing, off-beat presentation, and lifeless animation. Rebecca Silverman commended the "pleasant simplicity" of the character designs and "sufficiently catchy" theme songs but felt the main cast were "blandly appealing" and the overall tone to be "slightly dull." Jacob Chapman found the episode to be "uninspired and boring", criticizing the production, soundtrack, story and characters for lacking any "spark of life or originality", saying "it's an easy skip for all but the most diehard fans of milquetoast romance." Conversely, Nick Creamer appreciated the anthology format and slice-of-life pacing to the initial romances but felt were undermined by the lackluster art direction and presentation, calling the overall episode "perfectly functional."

=== Series ===
Allen Moody, writing for THEM Anime Reviews, gave credit to the "attractive and finely-detailed" character art and the Cellchrome opening but was critical of the four main characters and their respective relationships, the unmemorable supporting cast and Rie Kugimiya's performance as Mami, concluding that: "It's a going-through-the-motions romantic drama with two male leads who BOTH make you want to beat some sense into them with a baseball bat, and two girls without much fire or spirit in their souls at all." Jensen reviewed the complete anime series in 2018. He found neither of the four main leads nor their relationships interesting to grab viewers attention, the supporting cast underutilized, production values adequate at best, and felt the series was aimless towards both the teen romantic drama and slice-of-life crowds, concluding that: "[I]n a medium that tends to go after single, narrow demographics, something as unfocused as Convenience Store Boy Friends seems unlikely to find much of an audience. Whatever you're looking for, this show probably isn't your best option."
