= Justin Briner =

American voice actor

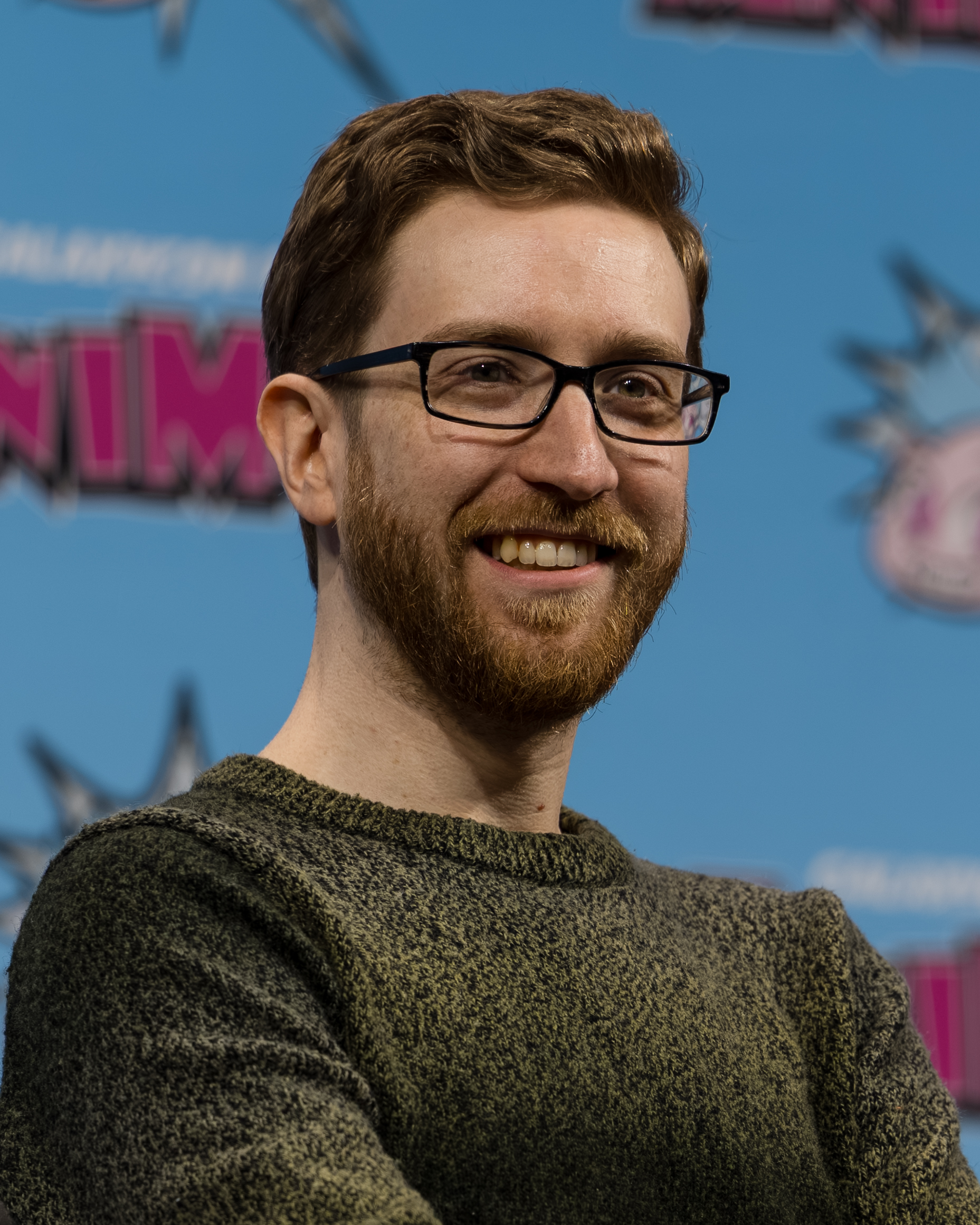
- Briner at Animate! Columbus in 2026
- Born: Maryland, U.S.
- Education: University of North Texas
- Occupation: Voice actor
- Years active: 2012–present

Justin Briner is an American voice actor. He has provided voices for English-language versions of anime films and television series. He is best known for his role as Izuku "Deku" Midoriya in My Hero Academia.

Briner has also voiced Mikaela Hyakuya in Seraph of the End, Maki Katsuragi in Stars Align, Qwenthur Barbotage in Heavy Object, Alfonso San Valiante in Garo: The Animation, Luck Voltia in Black Clover, Kensuke Hanasaki in Trickster, Ichi in the game Cibele, Shō Kusakabe from Fire Force, Hanako/Amane Yugi from Toilet-Bound Hanako-kun.

== Biography ==
Justin Briner was born and raised in Maryland. He has a younger sister, Hayley Briner. He attended the University of North Texas and studied theater prior to finding voice acting work. In 2015, he starred as the voice of Mikaela Hyakuya, one of the two main teenage orphans who turns into a vampire in the anime series Seraph of the End, which was released through Funimation's broadcast dub service. He voiced Elam, a boy who serves Arslan's main party member Narsus, in The Heroic Legend of Arslan. He voiced main protagonist Qwenthur Barbotage in the mech-themed anime show Heavy Object. A reviewer wrote on Anime UK News that she was impressed with the quality of the dub and that Briner and fellow voice actor Micah Solusod "have a lot to do with how instantly likably the characters come across, which helps carry the whole show".

In video games, Briner voiced Ichi, the love interest of the main character, in Cibele, an indie video game about developing an online relationship. Cibele won a Nuovo Award at 2016 Independent Games Festival, and made Briner's name known in mainstream news.

In My Hero Academia, Briner voiced the lead character Izuku Midoriya, a middle school student who was not born with superhero powers but lives in a superhero-based world, and is recruited to enroll in a school for superheroes. Alex Osborn of IGN described his performance as excellent and standout, while Tom Speelman of Polygon noted that he and his Japanese counterpart "nail the optimistic nerdiness and heroic attitude" with Briner "channeling a bit of Morty Smith for good measure". The series has run for eight seasons, with Briner and fellow voice actor Christopher Sabat doing panels and interviews at anime conventions including Anime Expo and San Diego Comic-Con regarding their work on the show.

Briner has continued to voice lead and main characters in other anime shows. He voiced Alfonso San Valiante the crown prince in the first Garo: The Animation series, which Robert Prentice of Three If By Space described the English cast "a great lineup", in particular highlighting Briner. In 2016, voiced Lance in the anime adaptation of Puzzle & Dragons X, and Nasu no Yoichi in the alternate history anime Drifters. In the prison comedy Nanbaka, his vocal performance was described as "more awestruck and childlike" than that of the original Japanese counterpart. Anne Laurenroth of Anime News Network found Briner's portrayal of Kensuke Hanasaki in Trickster helped prevent his pre-backstory character from getting overly annoying. Briner has also been involved in the production side as the head writer on the ADR script for Rio: Rainbow Gate.

In 2017, he voiced lead characters Haruki Mishima in Convenience Store Boy Friends, Tazuna Takatsuki in Hand Shakers, and Ernesti "Eru" Echavalier in Knight's & Magic. In the same year, he landed the lead role of Justice "Seigi" Akatsuka in Taboo Tattoo.

In 2021, Briner voiced Mio Chibana in the English dub of The Stranger by the Shore, the anime film adaptation of Kanna Kii's boys' love manga L'étranger de la Plage, the first installment in the L'étranger series. The film, directed by Akiyo Ohashi and produced by Studio Hibari, opened in Japan on September 11, 2020.

== Filmography ==
=== Anime ===
List of English dubbing performances in anime
Year	Title	Role	Notes	Source
2015	Yona of the Dawn	Teu		
2015	D-Frag!	Kawabata	Ep. 6	
2015	Seraph of the End	Mikaela Hyakuya	2 seasons	
2015–16	The Heroic Legend of Arslan	Elam		Tweet
2015	Gangsta.	Wallace "Worick" Arcangelo (Young)		Tweet
2015	Heavy Object	Qwenthur Barbotage		
2015	Ninja Slayer From Animation	Kohai	Ep. 18	
2015	Ultimate Otaku Teacher	Maekawa	Ep. 3	
2015	Snow White with the Red Hair	Shuka	Ep. 5	[100]
2016	Prince of Stride: Alternative	Reiji Suwa		
2016	Grimgar of Fantasy and Ash	Manato		
2016	Dimension W	Salva-Enna-Tibesti (Young)	Ep. 8	
2016	Garo: The Animation	Alfonso San Valiante		
2016–25	My Hero Academia	Izuku Midoriya / Deku	Lead role	
2016	Puzzle & Dragons X	Lance		
2016	Handa-kun	Hasegawa		
2016	Danganronpa 3: The End of Hope's Peak High School series	Ryota Mitarai		
2016	Show by Rock!! #	Arashi		Tweet
2016	Chaos Dragon	Hakuei		
2016	Alderamin on the Sky	Iriq Bauza	Eps. 1–2	
2016	Rampo Kitan: Game of Laplace	Hashiba		
2016	91 Days	Frate Vanetti		Tweet
2016	All Out!!	Sumiaki Iwashimizu		
2016	Cheer Boys!!	Ryuzo Sakuma		
2016	Divine Gate	Breunor		
2016	Drifters	Nasu no Yoichi		
2016	Hetalia The World Twinkle	Ladonia		Tweet
2016	Nanbaka	Nico		
2016	Rio: Rainbow Gate!	N/A	Head Writer; Assistant ADR Director; Production Assistant	
2016	Kiss Him, Not Me	Hayato Shinomiya		
2016	The Disastrous Life of Saiki K.	Sawakita		Tweet
2016	Tōken Ranbu: Hanamaru	Hirano Toshiro		
2016	Trickster	Kensuke Hanasaki		
2016	Yuri on Ice	Emil Nekola		
2017	Masamune-kun's Revenge	Kojuro Shuri		
2017	Chain Chronicle: The Light of Haecceitas	Clauss		
2017	Dragon Ball Super	Kid Vegeta, Kuru	Ep. 6 – Funimation dub	Tweet
2017	Sakura Quest	Taiga Hayama		
2017	Space Patrol Luluco	Alpha Omega Nova		
2017	ACCA: 13-Territory Inspection Dept.	Magie		
2017	Akashic Records of Bastard Magic Instructor	Rainer Layer		
2017	Code: Realize − Guardian of Rebirth	Finis		
2017	Convenience Store Boy Friends	Haruki Mishima		
2017	Garo: Crimson Moon	Minamoto no Yorinobu		
2017	Gosick	Theodore	Ep. 8	
2017	Hand Shakers	Tazuna Takatsuki		
2017	Star Blazers: Space Battleship Yamato 2199	Toru Hoshina		
2017	King's Game The Animation	Ryo Sugisawa		
2017	Knight's & Magic	Ernesti "Eru" Echavalier		
2017	Saiyuki Reload Blast	Tamuro		
2017	Black Clover	Luck Voltia		
2017	Taboo Tattoo	Justice Akatsuka	Script	
2017–present	Classroom of the Elite	Kiyotaka Ayanokoji		
2018	Cardcaptor Sakura: Clear Card	Yukito Tsukishiro / Yue		
2018	Hakyu Hoshin Engi	Nataku		
2018	Pop Team Epic	Popuko	Ep. 1a	
2018	Death March to the Parallel World Rhapsody	Ichiro Suzuki / Sato Pendragon		
2018	Garo: Vanishing Line	Alan	Ep. 18	
2018	Darling in the Franxx	9'α		
2018	Hakata Tonkotsu Ramens	Siva		
2018	Junji Ito Collection	Hironobu Ōtsuka	Ep12	
2018	Kakuriyo no Yadomeshi	Sasuke		
2018	Dances with the Dragons	Beldritt	Eps. 4–5	
2018	Overlord III	Kuunel	Ep. 2	
2018	Lord of Vermilion: The Crimson King	Kotetsu Dōmyōji		
2018	Double Decker! Doug & Kirill	Apple Bieber		Tweet
2018	Hinomaru Sumo	Shun Kariya		
2019	Meiji Tokyo Renka	Rentarō Taki	Ep. 7	
2019	YU-NO: A Girl Who Chants Love at the Bound of this World	Masakatsu Yūki		
2019	Sarazanmai	Enta Jinai		
2019	Fairy Tail	Zeref Dragneel, Eve Tearm	Temporary replacement for Joel McDonald	Tweet
2019	The Ones Within	Akatsuki Iride		Tweet
2019	Attack on Titan	Grisha Yeager (Young)		
2019–	Dr. Stone	Ginro		
2019	Stars Align	Maki Katsuragi		
2019	Case File nº221: Kabukicho	James Moriarty		
2019	Ensemble Stars!	Tsumugi Aoba		
2019	Fire Force	Shō Kusakabe		
2019	Actors: Songs Connection	Minori		
2020	Toilet-Bound Hanako-kun	Hanako / Amane Yugi		
2020	Listeners	Echo Rec		
2021	Ikebukuro West Gate Park	Mitsuki Fujimoto		
2021	Ranking of Kings	Daida		
2022	Trapped in a Dating Sim: The World of Otome Games is Tough for Mobs	Brad		
2022	Lucifer and the Biscuit Hammer	Zan Amal	Ep. 9	Tweet
2023	The Legendary Hero Is Dead!	Sion Breydan		
2023	The Great Cleric	Luciel		
2024	Natsume's Book of Friends	Katsumi Shibata		
2024	Blue Lock Season 2	Yo Hiori		Tweet
2024–present	Solo Leveling	Yoo Jin-ho		
2025	Failure Frame	Tomohiro Yasu		
2025	My Hero Academia: Vigilantes	Izuku Midoriya		
2026	Hana-Kimi	Nakao		
2026	Witch Hat Atelier	Euini		
2026	The Laid-Off Cheat-Granting Mage Enjoys a Second Lease on Life	Rein Garland		

=== Films ===
List of voice performances in films
Year	Title	Role	Notes	Source
2017	Black Butler: Book of the Atlantic	Edward Midford	English dub	
2018	My Hero Academia: Two Heroes	Izuku Midoriya	English dub	
2020	My Hero Academia: Heroes Rising	Izuku Midoriya	English dub	
2020	L'étranger series (The Stranger by the Shore)	Mio Chibana	English dub	
2021	My Hero Academia: World Heroes' Mission	Izuku Midoriya	English dub	
2024	My Hero Academia: You're Next	Izuku Midoriya	English dub	

=== Web series ===
List of voice performances in web series
Year	Title	Role	Notes	Source
2011	[Homestuck] The Sufferer's Final Sermon	The Sufferer	A Homestuck fan animation	
2015	DragonBall Z Abridged MOVIE: Super Android 13	Teen Gohan (Uncredited)	A TeamFourStar abridged film	
2015–20	Final Fantasy VII: Machinabridged	Cloud Strife	A TeamFourStar abridged series	
2018	Death Battle	Pit		

=== Video games ===
List of voice performances in video games
Year	Title	Role	Notes	Source
2012	Dust: An Elysian Tail	Moska		
2014	DreadOut	Yayan		
2015	Cibele	Ichi (Note: In the video game Cibele, Briner provides the voices for Ichi / Blake, while the online pictures and videos are of creator Nina Freeman's boyfriend and developer Emmett Butler.)		
2017	Akiba's Beat	Taro Megane	English dub	
2017	Regalia: Of Men and Monarchs	Theo, additional voices		
2018	Dragon Ball FighterZ	Announcer	English dub	
2018	Octopath Traveler	Additional voices	English dub	
2019	Dragon Ball Xenoverse 2	Uub/Majuub	English dub; Ultra Pack 2	
2019	Borderlands 3	Dalton, Edgren, Failurebot, Thunk		
2020	Dragon Ball Z: Kakarot	World Martial Arts Tournament Announcer	English dub; Hub World Only	
2020	My Hero One's Justice 2	Izuku Midoriya	English dub	
2023	Fire Emblem Engage	Clanne	English dub	
