= Ricco Fajardo =

American voice actor (born 1983)

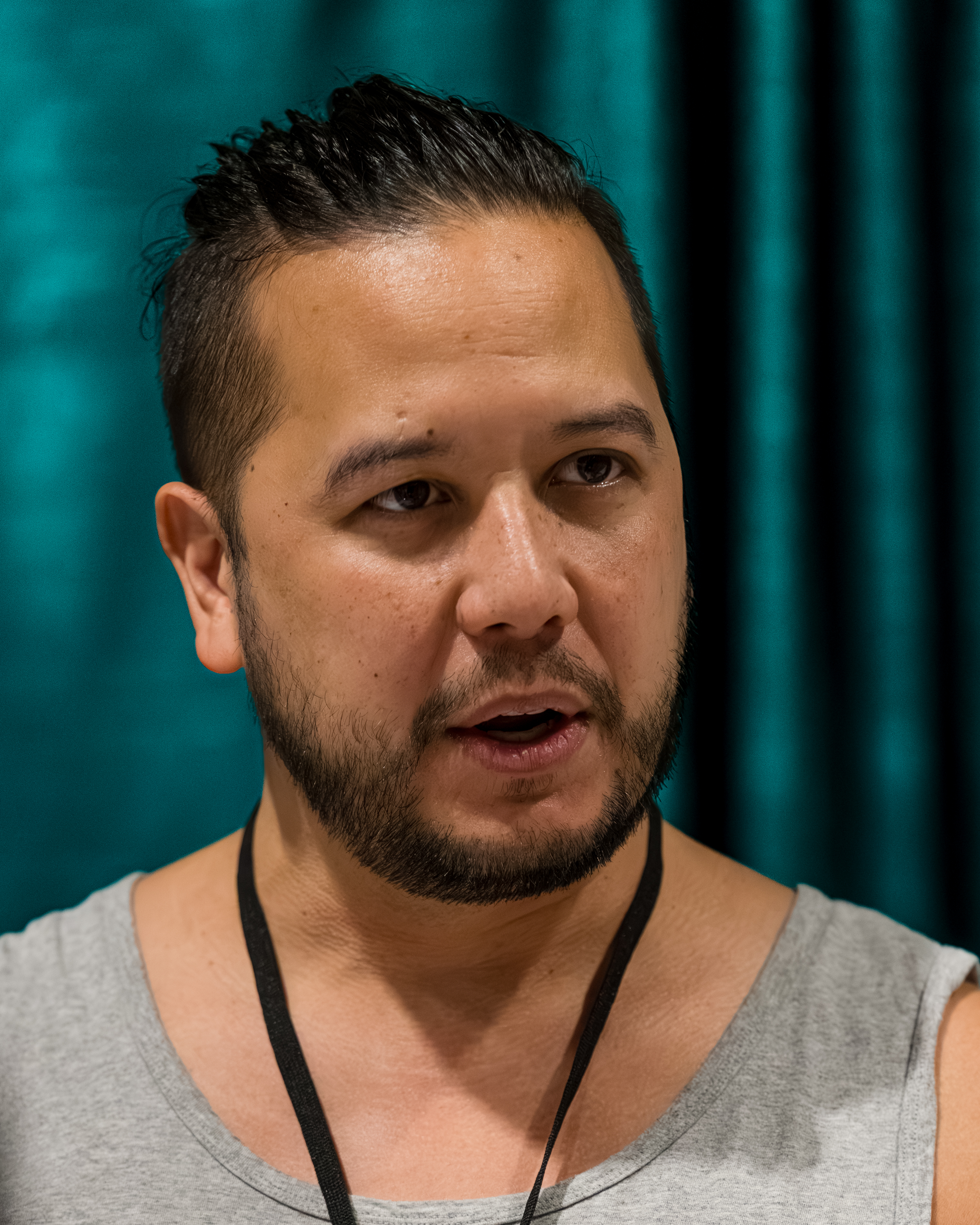
- Fajardo at GalaxyCon Oklahoma City in 2026
- Born: October 26, 1983 (age 43)
- Education: University of California, Irvine (BA); Southern Methodist University (MFA)
- Occupation: Voice actor
- Years active: 2012–present

Ricco Fajardo (born October 26, 1983) is an American voice actor who has provided voices for English versions of Japanese anime series and video games. Some of his roles include Taiju Oki in Dr. Stone, Itona Horibe in Assassination Classroom, Mirio Togata in My Hero Academia, Kotaro Tatsumi in Zombie Land Saga, Daryun in The Heroic Legend of Arslan, Tor Kokonoe in Absolute Duo, Leon Luis in Garo: The Animation, Kyousuke Munakata in Danganronpa 3: The End of Hope's Peak High School, Haruhiro in Grimgar of Fantasy and Ash and Junichiro Kubota in Tomo-chan Is a Girl!.

== Filmography ==
=== Anime ===
List of voice performances in anime
Year	Title	Role	Notes	Ref.
2012	B Gata H Kei	Kota Akimoto	Debut role	
2012	Aria the Scarlet Ammo	Goki Muto		
2013	We Without Wings: Under the Innocent Sky	Shusuke Chitose		
2015	Assassination Classroom	Itona Horibe	Also Koro-sensei Q!	
2015	Unbreakable Machine-Doll	Magnus		
2015	Absolute Duo	Tor Kokonoe	First lead role	
2015	Show By Rock!! series	Kai	2 seasons	
2015	The Heroic Legend of Arslan series	Daryun	2 seasons	
2015	Dance with Devils	Mage Nanashiro		
2016	Prince of Stride: Alternative	Takeru Fujiwara		
2016	Lord Marksman and Vanadis	Ryurik		
2016	Grimgar of Fantasy and Ash	Haruhiro		
2016	Brothers Conflict	Kazuma Sasakura		
2016	Fairy Tail	Jackal		
2016	Garo: The Animation	Leon Luis		
2016	Danganronpa 3: The End of Hope's Peak Academy	Kyosuke Munakata		
2016	Nanbaka	Mitsuru Hitokoe		
2016	Fight Ippatsu! Jūden-chan!!	Tentacle Monster		
2016	Alderamin on the Sky	Sarihaslag Remeon		
2016	All Out!!	Shinnosuke Hyosu		
2016	Castle Town Dandelion	Shu Sakurada		
2016	The Disastrous Life of Saiki K.	Takeru Shinoda		
2016	D.Gray-man	Bak Chang	Also Hallow	
2016–18	Touken Ranbu: Hanamaru series	Tsurumaru Kuninaga	2 seasons	
2017	Garo: Crimson Moon	Yasusuke		
2017	Fuka	Makoto Mikasa		
2017	Chaos;Child	Takuru Miyashiro		
2017	Saga of Tanya the Evil	Ihlen Schwarzkopf		
2017	Chain Chronicle: The Light of Haecceitas	Yuri		
2017	Kenka Bancho Otome: Girl Beats Boys	Yuta Mirako		
2017	Sakura Quest	Kosuke Midorikawa		
2017	Attack on Titan	Rashad	Ep. 8 Season 2	
2017	Code Geass: Akito the Exiled	Ryo Sayama		
2017	18if	Haruto Tsukishiro		
2017	Convenience Store Boy Friends	Towa Honda		
2017	Tsuredure Children	Takeru Goda		
2017	Restaurant to Another World	Shareef	Eps. 9, 12	
2017	Hundred	Hayato Kisaragi		
2017	D.Gray-man Hallow	Bak Chang		
2017	Recovery of an MMO Junkie	Kanbe		
2017	King's Game The Animation	Hideki Toyoda	Ep. 2	
2017	Star Blazers: Space Battleship Yamato 2199	Daisuke Shima		
2017	Ai no Kusabi	Guy		
2017	Black Clover	Nozel Silva		
2018	Junji Ito Collection	Koichi	Eps. 1, 5	
2018	Basilisk: The Ouka Ninja Scrolls	Hachiro Koga		
2018	Hakyu Hoshin Engi	Dotoku	2018 reboot	
2018	Hakata Tonkotsu Ramens	Irasawa		
2018	Darling in the Franxx	9'γ		
2018	Kakuriyo no Yadomeshi	Hatori		
2018	Dragon Ball Super	Watagash		
2018	Ace Attorney	Richard Wellington	Season 2	
2018–2021	Zombie Land Saga	Kotaro Tatsumi, Kiichi Momozaki	Also Revenge	
2018–2025	My Hero Academia	Mirio Togata		
2018–present	That Time I Got Reincarnated as a Slime	Benimaru	2 Seasons	
2019	Arifureta: From Commonplace to World's Strongest	Kouki Amanogawa		
2019	Actors: Songs Connection	Keishi		
2019–2021	Fruits Basket	Hiroshi, Additional Voices		
2019–present	Dr. Stone	Taiju Oki	4 Seasons	
2019–present	Radiant	Piodan		
2020	Plunderer	Tokikaze Sakai		
2020	The Millionaire Detective Balance: Unlimited	Haru Katō		
2020	Uzaki-chan Wants to Hang Out!	Shinichi Sakurai		
2020	By the Grace of the Gods	Jill		
2021	The Duke of Death and His Maid	Zain		
2021	2.43: Seiin High School Boys Volleyball Team	Misao Aoki		
2022	Trapped in a Dating Sim: The World of Otome Games Is Tough for Mobs	Julius		
2022	Heroines Run the Show	Ken		
2022	Shoot! Goal to the Future	Yoshiharu Kubo		
2022	The Slime Diaries: That Time I Got Reincarnated as a Slime	Benimaru, Yashichi		
2022	Blue Lock	Yoichi Isagi		
2023	Tomo-chan Is a Girl!	Junichiro Kubota		
2023	The Legendary Hero Is Dead!	Touka Scott		
2023	My Tiny Senpai	Chihiro Akina		
2023-2025	The Apothecary Diaries	Lakan	2 Seasons	
2024	Bucchigiri?!	Matakara Asamine		
2024	Viral Hit	Kim Moon-seong		
2024	Why Does Nobody Remember Me in This World?	Kai		
2024	The Elusive Samurai	Suwa Yorishige		
2024	Seirei Gensouki: Spirit Chronicles	Slave Trader		
2025	Solo Leveling	Minsung Lee	Season 2	
2025	Wind Breaker	Enomoto	Season 2	
2025	Teogonia	Olha		
2025	Tougen Anki	Rokuro Kiriyama		
2026	Dark Moon: The Blood Altar	Khan		
2026	Tune In to the Midnight Heart	Arisu Yamabuki		
2026	Overgeared	Grid		
2026	Beyblade X	Eight Cross		

=== Animation ===
List of voice performances in animation
Year	Title	Role	Notes	Ref.
2018–19	Red vs. Blue	Genkins	Seasons 16–17	
2025	To Be Hero X	Dragon Boy		

=== Film ===
List of voice performances in films
Year	Title	Role	Notes	Ref.
2012	Tales of Vesperia: The First Strike	Kansuke		
2017	Genocidal Organ	John Paul		

=== Video games ===
List of voice performances in video games
Year	Title	Role	Notes	Ref.
2014	Smite	Camazotz, Achilles		
2017	Fire Emblem Heroes	Ferdinand von Aegir	Second voice following Billy Kametz's death in 2022.	
2018	Dragon Ball Xenoverse 2	Fu		
2020	Paladins	Corvus, Mernos Jenos		
2021	Tales of Luminaria	Maxime Hasselmans		
2023	Fire Emblem Engage	Pandreo		
2023	Trinity Trigger	Zantis Gheldyne		
2023	Disgaea 7: Vows of the Virtueless	Partyasu		
2023	Avatar: The Last Airbender - Quest for Balance	Cabbage Merchant		
2023	Nickelodeon All-Star Brawl 2	Cabbage Merchant		
2024	Ys X: Nordics	Rafe Evelies		
2025	Borderlands 4	Arjay		
2025	Zenless Zone Zero	Komano Manato		
2026	Avatar Legends: The Fighting Game	Cabbage Merchant		
