= Garo: The Animation =

Japanese anime franchise

牙狼〈GARO〉 (Garo)
- Genre: Dark fantasy, superhero
- Created by: Keita Amemiya
- Anime television series

Garo: The Carved Seal of Flames
- Directed by: Yuichiro Hayashi
- Produced by: Takahiro Suzuki
- Written by: Yasuko Kobayashi
- Music by: Monaca
- Studio: MAPPA
- Licensed by: NA: Funimation; SEA: Medialink
- Original network: TXN (TV Tokyo), Star Channel, Family Gekijo
- Original run: October 3, 2014 – March 27, 2015
- Episodes: 24 + OVA
- Anime television series

Garo: Crimson Moon
- Directed by: Atsushi Wakabayashi
- Produced by: Junichi Takagi
- Written by: Shō Aikawa; Toshiki Inoue
- Music by: Monaca
- Studio: MAPPA
- Licensed by: NA: Funimation; SEA: Medialink
- Original network: TXN (TV Tokyo), Star Channel, Family Gekijo
- Original run: October 9, 2015 – April 1, 2016
- Episodes: 23 + OVA
- Anime film

Garo: The Fleeting Cherry Blossom
- Directed by: Satoshi Nishimura
- Produced by: Takahiro Suzuki; Takashi Kubo
- Written by: Yasuko Kobayashi
- Music by: Ryuuichi Takada (Monaca)
- Studio: Studio M2; Studio VOLN
- Released: October 6, 2018
- Runtime: 82 minutes
- Related
- Garo: Divine Flame (film); Garo: Vanishing Line
- icon

Garo: The Animation is a Japanese animated franchise based on the Garo tokusatsu drama. Each entry takes place within its own narrative and continuity. Each entry is licensed for streaming in North America by Funimation.

The first entry of the series, titled in Japan as Garo: The Carved Seal of Flames (Japanese: 牙狼〈GARO〉-炎の刻印-, Hepburn: Garo -Honō no Kokuin-), premiered in October 2014, featuring character designs from Hiroyuki Takei. A sequel follow-up film titled Garo: Divine Flame (牙狼〈GARO〉-DIVINE FLAME-) premiered in Japan on May 21, 2016.

A second anime series titled Garo: Crimson Moon (Japanese: 牙狼〈GARO〉-紅蓮ノ月-, Hepburn: GARO -Guren no Tsuki-) premiered in October 2015. This second series, which had a premiere event at the 88th Comiket, features character designs from Masakazu Katsura. A film sequel titled Garo: The Fleeting Cherry Blossom (薄墨桜 -GARO-, Usuzumizakura -GARO-; lit. "Gray Cherry Blossoms: Garo") premiered in Japan on October 6, 2018.

A third anime series titled Garo: Vanishing Line (牙狼〈GARO〉-VANISHING LINE-) premiered in October 2017.

== Plot ==
=== Garo: The Carved Seal of Flames ===
The first series is set in the fictitious Valiante Kingdom (ヴァリアンテ国, Variante-koku), which resembles Spain during the Spanish Inquisition. After the king, under the influence of his advisor Mendoza, launches a witch hunt that endangers both Makai Knights and Makai Alchemists, a Makai Alchemist named Anna is burned at the stake while giving birth to León Luis, who is spirited off by his Makai Knight father Germán Luis to be trained to inherit the title of Golden Knight Garo. Years later, after Valiante is now plagued with Horrors as Mendoza, revealed to be an excommunicated Makai Alchemist, uses them to assert his authority after usurping the throne, the king's son Prince Alfonso seeks out the assistance of Garo to reclaim the throne, but also trains as a Makai Knight to become Gaia the Knight of Defense. The fully grown León returns to the land of his birth at this time to avenge his mother. Both he and Alfonso meet and learn that they are in fact maternal cousins whose grandfather was the previous Garo. Though León was relieved of the Garo title after Mendoza's assumed death for misconduct, Alfonso contends with the surviving Horrors in his kingdom. After discarding his drive for revenge and deciding to become a protector instead, León reclaims his armor and title, and joins forces with his friends to search for Mendoza once it is confirmed that he is still alive.

=== Garo: Divine Flame ===
Divine Flame takes place four years after the events of the first season, Garo: The Carved Seal of Flames. It follows the adventures of León, Alfonso, Ema and Germán as they try to stop a powerful Horror who plans to use Germán's son Roberto as a sacrifice.

=== Garo: Crimson Moon ===
Crimson Moon is set in Japan during the Heian period, and features fictionalized versions of many Japanese historical figures. This time, Garo is a young Japanese man named Raikou who cannot properly summon the Garo armor himself, and instead relies on his companion, a female Makai Alchemist named Seimei, whose Makai magic allows him to become Garo to fight the Horrors infesting Heian-kyō. They are accompanied by a young boy named Kintoki who wishes to follow in Raikou's footsteps. Their journey pits them against the evil Ashiya Douman, a fallen Makai Alchemist who summons Horrors to do his bidding. They are later accompanied in their fight by Fujiwara no Yasusuke, who becomes the bearer of the armor of Zanga the White Lotus Knight.

=== Garo: The Fleeting Cherry Blossom ===
The film features the characters from the Crimson Moon series; Raikou, Kintoki and Seimei. They are confronted by a Horror that inhabits an ancient cherry blossom tree. The Horror is activated by the brother and sister Tokimaru and Akira in revenge against Emperor Michinaga for their clan's ancestor Duke Kan, Sugawara-no-Michizane of the Hajimi, who was accused of treason and exiled. Tokimaru and Akira plan to take revenge on the current Emperor Michinaga, but Raikou, Kintoki and Seimei with the aid of the Makai Knight Yasusuke combine to stop the Horror. Later, Michinaga is arrested for callous disregard of the safety of the population within the capital.

=== Garo: Vanishing Line ===
Vanishing Line is set during the modern era in the fictitious Russell City, a prosperous American city based on New York City. This time, the bearer of Golden Knight Garo is a muscular man named Sword. He is the first to hear the first stirrings of the plot, and throws himself into a shadow war in order to expose it. His only clue is the key word "El Dorado." He meets Sophia Heness, a young girl searching for her missing older brother who has only left her with the same words: "El Dorado." With Sword having also lost his younger sister in the past, both are drawn together by the words, and work together to find out its meaning.

== Audio drama ==
A four-episode audio drama series features a crossover between the three anime series.

1. "Crimson Thunder" (紅雷, "Kōrai"): An episode focusing on Sophie, Ema Guzmán, and Seimei.
2. "Fate" (宿命, "Shukumei"): An episode focusing on Sword and Raikou.
3. "Inner Darkness" (心闇, "Shin'en"): An episode focusing on Luke, León Luis, and Fujiwara no Yasusuke.
4. "Gold" (黄金, "Ōgon"): An episode focusing on León Luis, Raikou, and Sword.
