= List of Japanese actresses =

The following is a list of Japanese actresses in surname alphabetical order. Names are displayed given name first, per Wikipedia manual of style.

To be included in this list, the person must have a Wikipedia article showing that they are Japanese actresses or must have references showing that they are Japanese actresses and are notable.

== A ==
- Haruka Abe
- Natsumi Abe
- Rika Adachi
- Yumi Adachi
- Saki Aibu
- Shoko Aida
- Yuzuki Aikawa
- Rina Aizawa
- Kyoko Aizome
- Sayaka Akimoto
- Tsubasa Akimoto
- Yoko Akino
- Kumiko Akiyoshi
- Yūki Amami
- Chisato Amate
- Eiko Ando
- Sakura Andō
- Yū Aoi
- Wakana Aoi
- Mayuko Aoki
- Tsuru Aoki
- Yuko Araki
- Yui Aragaki
- Michiyo Aratama
- Narimi Arimori
- Kasumi Arimura
- Momoka Ariyasu
- Nao Asahi
- Mayumi Asaka
- Nana Asakawa
- Aiko Asano
- Atsuko Asano
- Yūko Asano
- Ruriko Asaoka
- Kumiko Asō
- Yumi Asō
- Chikage Awashima
- Haruka Ayase
- Aya Asahina
- Kokoro Aoshima

== B ==
- Fumika Baba
- Chieko Baisho
- Mitsuko Baisho

== C ==
- Catalina Yue
- Chara
- Chiaki (Fujimoto Chiaki)
- Reiko Chiba

== D ==
- Rei Dan
- Natsuki Deguchi

== E ==
- Kanako Enomoto
- Makiko Esumi

== F ==
- Rie Fu
- Yuko Fueki
- Sumiko Fuji
- Takako Fuji
- Mina Fujii
- Miho Fujima
- Mizuki Fukumura
- Shiho Fujimura
- Ryōko Fujino
- Yumiko Fujita
- Ayako Fujitani
- Miki Fujitani
- Miwako Fujitani
- Norika Fujiwara
- Kyoko Fukada
- Mai Fukagawa
- Mayuko Fukuda
- Eri Fukatsu
- Kazue Fukiishi
- Mayuko Fukuda
- Rila Fukushima
- Haruka Fukuhara
- Seika Furuhata
- Riko Fukumoto

== G ==
- Ayame Goriki
- Kumiko Goto
- Maki Goto

== H ==
- Michiko Hada
- Chisaki Hama
- Mie Hama
- Minami Hamabe
- Ayumi Hamasaki
- Rumi Hanai
- Sachie Hara
- Setsuko Hara
- Tomoyo Harada
- Haru
- Kyōko Hasegawa
- Ai Hashimoto
- Kanna Hashimoto
- Manami Hashimoto
- Reika Hashimoto
- Yoshie Hayasaka
- Hiroko Hayashi
- Akari Hayami
- Riona Hazuki
- Emiri Henmi
- Mari Henmi
- Manami Higa
- Ryōko Hirosue
- Alice Hirose
- Suzu Hirose
- Aika Hirota
- Ikumi Hisamatsu
- Yuriko Hishimi
- Tae Hitoto
- Miyu Honda
- Tsubasa Honda
- Maki Horikita
- Mari Hoshino
- Tomoko Hoshino
- Naomi Hosokawa
- Akane Hotta
- Mayu Hotta

== I ==
- Yui Ichikawa
- Hiroe Igeta
- Riho Iida
- Haruna Iikubo
- Marie Iitoyo
- Elaiza Ikeda
- Kimiko Ikegami
- Chizuru Ikewaki
- Rina Ikoma
- Shizuka Inoh (Annie Yi)
- Mio Imada
- Harumi Inoue
- Mao Inoue
- Takako Irie
- Noriko Iriyama
- Ayumi Ishida
- Hikari Ishida
- Yuriko Ishida
- Anna Ishibashi
- Shizuka Ishibashi
- Satomi Ishihara
- Mako Ishino
- Yōko Ishino
- Ayumi Ito
- Maiko Ito
- Misaki Ito
- Risako Itō
- Sairi Ito
- Yoshimi Iwasaki
- Shima Iwashita
- Rika Izumi
- Nagi Inoue
- Maya Imamori

== J ==
- Miki Jinbo
- Risa Junna

== K ==
- Kaho
- Mugi Kadowaki
- Meiko Kaji
- Shihori Kanjiya
- Bunko Kanazawa
- Miho Kanno
- Yumi Kaoru
- Yu Kashii
- Nagisa Katahira
- Erika Karata
- Ai Kato
- Natsuki Kato
- Moka Kamishiraishi
- Mone Kamishiraishi
- Atsuko Kawada
- Haruna Kawaguchi
- Ami Kawai
- Yuumi Kawai
- Miwako Kakei
- Rina Kawaei
- Umika Kawashima
- Asuka Kawazu
- Maiko Kazama
- Naoko Ken
- Rinko Kikuchi
- Rei Kikukawa
- Fumino Kimura
- Komako Kimura
- Tae Kimura
- Yoshino Kimura
- Asuka Kishi
- Keiko Kishi
- Yukino Kishii
- Kayoko Kishimoto
- Mirei Kiritani
- Kie Kitano
- Keiko Kitagawa
- Kaya Kiyohara
- Mao Kobayashi
- Satomi Kobayashi
- Kyōko Koizumi
- Fujiko Kojima
- Ayaka Komatsu
- Nana Komatsu
- Arisa Komiya
- Hiroko Konishi
- Manami Konishi
- Miho Konishi
- Sakurako Konishi
- Mahiru Konno
- Misako Konno
- Fuka Koshiba
- Koyuki
- Ayano Kudo
- Haruka Kudo
- Mio Kudo
- Risa Kudo
- Yuki Kudoh
- Ryoko Kuninaka
- Makiko Kuno
- Komaki Kurihara
- Sumiko Kurishima
- Chiaki Kuriyama
- Yuina Kuroshima
- Fukumi Kuroda
- Hitomi Kuroki
- Haru Kuroki
- Meisa Kuroki
- Reina Kurosaki
- Tomoka Kurotani
- Tetsuko Kuroyanagi
- Koharu Kusumi
- Shioli Kutsuna
- Machiko Kyō
- Yui Koike
- Shiori Kubo

== L ==
- Cynthia Luster

== M ==
- Erika Mabuchi
- Yōko Maki
- Aju Makita
- Erina Mano
- Takako Matsu
- Sumire Matsubara
- Airi Matsui
- Rena Matsui
- Ruka Matsuda
- Mayu Matsuoka
- Nanako Matsushima
- Moeko Matsushita
- Nao Matsushita
- Yuki Matsushita
- Yoko Matsuyama
- Wakana Matsumoto
- Keiko Matsuzaka
- Maki Meguro
- Sayumi Michishige
- Junko Mihara
- Mimura
- Sara Minami
- Yoko Minamino
- Hiroko Mita
- Sumiko Mizukubo
- Karen Miyama
- Nobuko Miyamoto
- Yume Miyamoto
- Junko Miyashita
- Sakura Miyawaki
- Aoi Miyazaki
- Rie Miyazawa
- Ayaka Miyoshi
- Maki Mizuno
- Miki Mizuno
- Kaori Momoi
- Kanako Momota
- Akiko Monou
- Kanna Mori
- Mitsuko Mori
- Nana Mori
- Naoko Mori
- Yoko Moriguchi
- Shigeru Muroi
- Ai Moritaka
- Suzuka Morita
- Aoi Morikawa

== N ==
- Anzu Nagai
- Masami Nagasawa
- Mei Nagano
- Anna Nagata
- Midori Naka
- Riisa Naka
- Anna Nakagawa
- Yukie Nakama
- Anne Nakamura
- Chise Nakamura
- Saemi Nakamura
- Tamao Nakamura
- Yurika Nakamura
- Ayami Nakajo
- Kumiko Nakano
- Ryoko Nakano
- Miki Nakatani
- Miho Nakayama
- Shinobu Nakayama
- Amuro Namie
- Kuriko Namino
- Mari Natsuki
- Yōko Natsuki
- Masako Natsume
- Mito Natsume
- Nanao
- Toshie Negishi
- Risa Niigaki
- Fumi Nikaido
- Yukiko Nikaido
- Yuki Ninagawa
- Naomi Nishida
- Mineko Nishikawa
- Akiko Nishina
- Nanase Nishino
- Mariya Nishiuchi
- Yōko Nogiwa
- Yuka Nomura
- Maho Nonami
- Rena Nōnen
- Meru Nukumi

== O ==
- Noriko Ogawa
- Kaori Oguri
- Megumi Ōhara
- Reiko Ohara
- Sakurako Ohara
- Suzuka Ohgo
- Ito Ohno
- Hikaru Ohsawa
- Ayumi Oka
- Mariko Okada
- Natsumi Okamoto
- Yukiko Okamoto
- Megumi Okina
- Makoto Okunaka
- Kazusa Okuyama
- Aya Omasa
- Machiko Ono
- Yuko Oshima
- Ichika Osaki
- Itsumi Osawa
- Chihiro Otsuka
- Nobuyo Ōyama
- Sayuri Oyamada

== P ==
- Jenny Pat (Jenny Murata)

== R ==
- Riria Kojima
- Ryo

== S ==
- Irie Saaya
- Hinako Saeki
- Yuki Saito
- Akane Sakanoue
- Rikako Sakata
- Hiyori Sakurada
- Nanami Sakuraba
- Hinako Sakurai
- Ayaka Sasaki
- Hinako Sano
- Hiroko Sato
- Oka Satomi
- Yasuko Sawaguchi
- Miyuu Sawai
- Erika Sawajiri
- Miyuki Sawashiro
- Megumi Seki
- Nana Seino
- Asaka Seto
- Kou Shibasaki
- Kyoka Shibata
- Kotono Shibuya
- Momoko Shibuya
- Mirai Shida
- Yuumi Shida
- Eihi Shiina
- Shiho
- Haruka Shimazaki
- Fumika Shimizu
- Misa Shimizu
- Mariko Shinoda
- Kavka Shishido
- Yui Sakuma
- Yua Shinkawa
- Yume Shinjo
- Ryoko Shinohara
- Tomoe Shinohara
- Mari Shirato
- Miki Sugimoto
- Hana Sugisaki
- Anne Suzuki
- Keiko Suzuka
- Mayo Suzukaze
- Honami Suzuki
- Kyōka Suzuki
- Nozomi Sasaki
- Nagisa Saitō

== T ==
- Yuna Taira
- Tomoko Tabata
- Mikako Tabe
- Yukari Tachibana
- Honami Tajima
- Kaho Takada
- Riho Takada
- Miho Takagi
- Saya Takagi
- Reni Takagi
- Ai Takahashi
- Hitomi Takahashi
- Hikaru Takahashi
- Kaori Takahashi
- Keiko Takahashi
- Rin Takanashi
- Maryjun Takahashi
- Atsuko Takahata
- Mitsuki Takahata
- Hideko Takamine
- Fubuki Takane
- Shiho Takano
- Reiko Takashima
- Mayuko Takata
- Rena Takeda
- Rina Takeda
- Keiko Takeshita
- Yūko Takeuchi
- Yukari Taki
- Miori Takimoto
- Sara Takatsuki
- Emi Takei
- Haruka Tateishi
- Shiori Tamai
- Tina Tamashiro
- Anna Tanaka
- Chie Tanaka
- Eri Tanaka
- Kinuyo Tanaka
- Misako Tanaka
- Reina Tanaka
- Yoshiko Tanaka
- Naomi Tani
- Noriko Tatsumi
- Erika Toda
- Keiko Toda
- Yukiko Todoroki
- Sato Tomomi
- Rie Tomosaka
- Reina Triendl
- Tsugumi
- Tao Tsuchiya
- Noa Tsurushima
- Mayu Tsuruta
- Yuri Tsunematsu
- Cocoro Toyoshima
- Ami Touma
- Hana Toyoshima

== U ==
- Rio Uchida
- Yuki Uchida
- Rina Uchiyama
- Takako Uehara
- Juri Ueno
- Aya Ueto
- Miyoshi Umeki
- Minami Umezawa

== W ==
- Akiko Wakabayashi
- Mayumi Wakamura
- Ayako Wakao
- Isako Washio
- Eriko Watanabe
- Natsuna Watanabe
- Noriko Watanabe

== Y ==
- Akiko Yada
- Alissa Yagi
- Emiko Yagumo
- Honoka Yahagi
- Hiroko Yakushimaru
- Anna Yamada
- Isuzu Yamada
- Yu Yamada
- Miyako Yamaguchi
- Momoe Yamaguchi
- Tomoko Yamaguchi
- Rio Yamashita
- Fujiko Yamamoto
- Azusa Yamamoto
- Hikaru Yamamoto
- Maika Yamamoto
- Mayumi Yamamoto
- Mirai Yamamoto
- Mizuki Yamamoto
- Natsuko Yamamoto
- Kasumi Yamaya
- Momiji Yamamura
- Hirona Yamazaki
- Miki Yanagi
- Narumi Yasuda
- Kimiko Yo
- Ryoko Yonekura
- Soo Yong
- Sayuri Yoshinaga
- Riho Yoshioka
- Miyu Yoshimoto
- Yuriko Yoshitaka
- Kyoko Yoshine
- Ai Yoshikawa
- Mio Yūki

== Z ==
- Naomi Zaizen

== See also ==
- List of Japanese actors
