= List of Kakegurui characters =

The cast of Kakegurui xx

The following is a list of the characters of the Kakegurui manga series.

== Main characters ==
=== Yumeko Jabami ===
Yumeko Jabami (蛇喰 夢子, Jabami Yumeko) is a mysterious transfer student to Hyakkaou Private Academy who initially appears modest, but shows a maniacal passion for high stakes gambling, as shown when her eyes glow red, which they often do. Her eyes are a hazel brown when not glowing red. She has long, straight black hair with bangs styled in a hime cut and red eyes. Although she dislikes games where the outcome is predetermined, she can quickly deduce how such games are being manipulated in her opponents' favor and, by doing so, she devises strategies that more often than not turn the tables on them.^{Ch. 1} Her increasing wagers and activities soon draws the attention of the student council. She lives alone as her sole relative, her older sister, has been hospitalized long-term.^{Ch. 10} When she is reduced to pet status, although she could easily pay her debts due to her family wealth or from her winnings, she chooses not to, so as to be involved in more games and so she can also freely challenge the student council president. She is also in the Jabami clan which is a branch connected to the Momobami clan(see below) ^{Vol. 2, 3} She is voiced by Saori Hayami in Japanese and by Erika Harlacher in the Netflix English dub and Estelle Link in the Sentai Filmworks dub.^{Ep. 1 credits} In the live-action drama, she is portrayed by Minami Hamabe. In the English live-action drama, she is portrayed by Miku Martineau.

=== Mary Saotome ===
Mary Saotome (早乙女 芽亜里, Saotome Mary) is a student in Yumeko and Ryota's class who begins the series as one of the school's top gamblers and Ryota's master. She also has a passion for high-stakes gambling, just like Yumeko, but instead of red, her eyes glow yellow. However, she is quickly humbled in a rock paper scissors card game, losing to Yumeko and having to become a house pet herself. ^{Ch. 1} Despite their initial antagonism, she later becomes Yumeko's ally. ^{Vol. 2} Unlike Yumeko, Mary aims for victory in every gamble and cares more for her social and monetary standing within the school. After learning how the student council president perceives the pets, Mary forms a grudge against her and aims to become the next Student Council president. ^{Vol. 3} In the prequel story Kakegurui Twin, it is revealed that Mary's family is not as well off as her peers, but she transfers to the school and learns how to survive and thrive in the school's gambling system. She manages to win a school space from the former student council vice president in which she then sets up a gambling den. She is voiced by Minami Tanaka in Japanese and by Kira Buckland in the Netflix English dub and Christina Kelly in the Sentai Filmworks dub. In the live-action drama, she is portrayed by Aoi Morikawa. She has blonde hair styled in twin tails in the manga and anime, whereas she has light brown hair and tails in the drama. She is a highly rated character who senses and comprehends cheats in gambles.

=== Ryota Suzui ===
Ryota Suzui (鈴井 涼太, Suzui Ryota) is a very poor gambler. Although he is the class president at the beginning of the series, he has a massive debt to Mary and serves as her pet. He is forced to help Mary manipulate a game against Yumeko,^{Ch. 1} but when Yumeko catches the scam and thanks him by paying off his debt and wanting to be friends,^{Ch. 1} Ryota becomes fiercely loyal and supporting to Yumeko, possibly even liking her. He tries to talk her out of engaging in high stakes gambling, but Yumeko hardly ever listens. He has a simple, and kind mindset; focusing on helping out whenever and however he can, rather than having fun, like Yumeko or winning, like Mary. Sometimes, Ryota's compulsiveness in gambling can also be seen when his eyes glow red, like Yumeko. He is voiced by Tatsuya Tokutake in Japanese and by Griffin Burns in the Netflix English dub and Adam Gibbs in the Sentai Filmworks dub.^{Ep. 1 credits} He is portrayed by Mahiro Takasugi in the live-action drama and Ayo Solanke in Bet (2025).

== Hyakkaou Student Council ==
=== Kirari Momobami ===
Kirari Momobami (桃喰 綺羅莉, Momobami Kirari) is the main antagonist of the series. She is the Student Council President and the head of the Momobami Clan (百喰一族, Momobami-ichizoku). She had defeated the former president in a high-stakes game two years prior to the story. Upon taking office, she created the hierarchy that turns the students with the largest debts into house pets. She comes to have an increasingly great deal of respect and admiration for Yumeko with every victory she obtains. She is voiced by Miyuki Sawashiro in Japanese, Michelle Ruff in the Netflix English dub and Olivia Swasey in the Sentai Filmworks dub.

=== Ririka Momobami ===
Ririka Momobami (桃喰 リリカ, Momobami Ririka) She is voiced by Miyuki Sawashiro in Japanese, Michelle Ruff in the Netflix English dub and Olivia Swasey in the Sentai Filmworks English dub. Ririka is Kirari Momobami's twin sister, sharing physical attributes, such as light grey hair and blue eyes; however, she wears her hair down, and does not wear blue lipstick. She is the vice-president of Hyakkaou's Student Council. She first appears wearing a grey theatrical mask with two almond-shaped eyes and a curved smile, but her true face is revealed later on in the series. Ririka is actually very shy and introverted by nature.

=== Sayaka Igarashi ===
Sayaka Igarashi (五十嵐 清華, Igarashi Sayaka) is the secretary of the Student Council, who is in love with Kirari and is deeply loyal to her. While she finds some of Kirari's motives questionable, Sayaka still remains loyal and will defend her against anyone who opposes her judgement.^{Ch. 2} She is voiced by Ayaka Fukuhara in Japanese and by Erica Lindbeck in the Netflix English dub and Melissa Molano in the Sentai Filmworks dub.^{Ep. 1 credits} She is played by Yurika Nakamura in the live-action drama.

=== Runa Yomozuki ===
Runa Yomozuki (黄泉月 るな, Yomozuki Runa) is a student council member and the leader of the Election Committee who likes video games and candy. She is always seen wearing a hoodie with rabbit ears, playing on a PlayStation, and sucking on a lollipop. She spends her time taunting various students. Her skills and preferences as a gambler have yet to be revealed. She showed herself to be an impartial mediator during the manga's 'Re-Election' arc. Her, and by extension the entire Election Committees, slogan is "Absolute Neutrality". She is voiced by Mayu Udono in Japanese and by Kayli Mills in the Netflix English dub and Britney Karbowski in the Sentai Filmworks English dub.^{Ep. 1 credits} She is played by Natsume Mito in the live-action drama.

=== Itsuki Sumeragi ===
Itsuki Sumeragi (皇 伊月, Sumeragi Itsuki) is an expert at card games. As the daughter of a toy company CEO, she became a student council member in her first year after having donated a large amount of money. After she financially drains her opponents, she influences them to wager and lose their fingernails and toenails, and as a result, has amassed quite a collection of nail art. After Yumeko figures out how Itsuki is able to cheat in a game of Double Concentration, Itsuki suffers a humiliating loss, and her seat on the council is revoked. She later became an ally to Yumeko in order to achieve her goal at rising up to Student Council President and exceed any expectations. It is hinted that she may have had a crush on Kaede Manyūda because of their similar ambitions but becomes heartbroken when he used her and deemed her worthless. She gets her revenge on Kaede by staking everything on Yumeko's victory but Itsuki is later shown with him in the hospital, indicating she still does care about him despite his poor treatment.^{Ch. 2} She is voiced by Yuki Wakai in Japanese and by Erica Mendez in the Netflix English dub and Cat Thomas in the Sentai Filmworks English dub.^{Ep. 1 credits} She is played by Ruka Matsuda in the live-action drama.

=== Midari Ikishima ===
Midari Ikishima (生志摩 妄, Ikishima Midari) is a second-year student and head of the Beautification Committee.^{Ch. 5} Midari wears an eyepatch after stabbing her own eye out to pay her gambling debt to Kirari, but remains loyal to the Student Council when Kirari promised to kill her in the future. She is aroused by violence, and often challenges opponents to increasingly violent gambles where the participants can either be maimed or killed, favoring modified versions of Russian roulette. After Yumeko forces their seemingly deadly game into a bloodless draw, she becomes infatuated with her.^{Ch. 5, Vol. 3} In the drama, she is typically chained up in a jail cell. She is voiced by Mariya Ise in Japanese and by Sarah Anne Williams in the Netflix English dub and Natalie Rial in the Sentai Filmworks English dub.^{Ep. 1 credits} In the live-action drama, she is played by Miki Yanagi. She is also the main protagonist in the spin-off series Kakegurui Midari.

=== Yuriko Nishinotouin ===
Yuriko Nishinotouin (西洞院 百合子, Nishinotōin Yuriko) is the head of the Traditional Culture Research Society and a member of the student council, who quietly uses her position to shield her club's girls from being enslaved by others. She runs a rigged roulette-style game called "Life or Death." She is known for her narrowed eyes, which she never widens them until Yumeko reveals her cheating methods.^{Ch. 3-4} She is voiced by Karin Nanami in Japanese and by Cristina Vee in the Netflix English dub and Genevieve Simmons in the Sentai Filmworks English dub.^{Ep. 1 credits} She is played by Natsumi Okamoto in the live-action drama.

=== Yumemi Yumemite ===
Yumemi Yumemite (夢見弖 ユメミ, Yumemite Yumemi) in public, is a part-time idol hoping to make it big, and at school, the Student Council's head of public relations. She secretly hopes to be an Academy Award-winning actress in Hollywood in the future and hates having to deal with her Japanese fans, whom she views as disgusting and perverted. She challenges Yumeko to a game of tic-tac-toe with a variety show challenge. After losing to Yumeko and having her secrets revealed to her fans, she finds out that her fans are fine with the way she is and accepts them. She decides to continue her career as an idol. She is voiced by Yū Serizawa in Japanese and by Faye Mata in the Netflix English dub and Maggie Flecknoe in the Sentai Filmworks English dub.^{Ep. 1 credits} She is played by Sayuri Matsumura in the live-action drama.

=== Kaede Manyuda ===
Kaede Manyuda (豆生田 楓, Manyūda Kaede) is the ambitious Student Council Treasurer who seeks to become the President at the earliest opportunity. He has short hair and wears glasses that he is always pushing up with his middle finger when speaking to someone. He is not above using others to achieve his goals or putting others down because of recent failures. He is also quick to question Kirari's methods when certain members fail or her sudden disappearance when she was called away. After losing a game to Yumeko, he is hospitalized and his hair turns white due to his great shock of destitution from underestimating his opponent. He makes a come back in 'Re-Election Arc' of the manga and becomes Yumeko's ally. He is voiced by Tomokazu Sugita in Japanese and by Chris Niosi in the Netflix English dub and Scott Gibbs in the Sentai Filmworks dub.^{Ep. 1 credits} In the live-action drama, he is portrayed by Taishi Nakagawa. In the drama, he attempts to recruit Mary to join the student council in order to go after the president,^{Ch. D10} rather than the president recruiting Mary.^{Vol. 3}

== Momobami Clan ==
=== Terano Totobami ===
Terano Totobami (等々喰 定楽乃, Totobami Terano) is a member of the Momobami clan who despises Kirari. She uses a wheelchair for unknown reasons. She is voiced by Megumi Han in Japanese, and Jennifer Losi in English.

=== Yumi Totobami ===
Yumi Totobami (等々喰 ユミ, Totobami Yumi) is a member of the Momobami clan and is also the one who moves Terano around on her wheelchair. She is voiced by Haruno Inoue in Japanese, and Corina Boettger in English.

=== Erimi Mushibami ===
Erimi Mushibami (蟲喰 恵利美, Mushibami Erimi) is a small girl with two different colored eyes. She dresses in a gothic lolita/goth harajuku style. Erimi comes from a family of torturers and uses her own device, the "Finger-Cutting Guillotine," in a gamble against Yumeko and Midari. Although she appears very cute, she has a sadistic personality and doesn't mind the mental torture of others. However, at the risk of hurting herself, she loses control and breaks into tears. She is voiced by Ayana Taketatsu in Japanese, and Lizzie Freeman in English.

=== Miyo Inbami ===
Miyo Inbami (陰喰 三欲, Inbami Miyo) is a girl from a family of apothecaries and poisoners who shares a secret method of communication with her sister, Miri, even after being separated. She secretly poisoned Yumeko to drag her and her friends into a card game with Yumeko's life on the line. She is voiced by Yumi Uchiyama in Japanese, and Maureen Price in English.

=== Miri Yobami ===
Miri Yobami (陽喰 三理, Yōbami Miri) is a girl from a family of apothecaries and poisoners who shares a secret method of communication with her sister, Miyo, even after being separated into two different families in a fight for succession. She is voiced by Rumi Ōkubo in Japanese, and Jeannie Tirado in English.

=== Sumika Warakubami ===
Sumika Warakubami (和楽喰 淑光, Warakubami Sumika) is a soft-spoken girl with a scary appearance who hides her face behind a cheap mask. Sumika later reveals her public persona as a famous Hollywood actress who goes by the name of Kawaru Natari, from a family of highly talented entertainers and performers. She battles Yumemi and Yumeko in a three-part variety show style challenge. She is voiced by Ayahi Takagaki in Japanese, and Dorothy Elias-Fahn in English.

=== Nozomi Komabami ===
Nozomi Komabami (狛喰 希, Komabami Nozomi) is a mischievous girl who dabbles in cryptocurrency. She also has a pet St. Bernard. She is voiced by Sayaka Kitahara in Japanese, and Jeannie Tirado in English.

=== Miraslava Honebami ===
Miraslava Honebami (骨喰 ミラスラーヴァ, Honebami Miraslava) a stern-faced girl from a family of "cleaners" with implied skill in interrogation and assassination. Miraslava is voiced by Mitsuki Saiga in Japanese, and Allegra Clark in English.

=== Ibara Obami ===
Ibara Obami (尾喰 茨, Obami Ibara) is a blunt, laid-back but aggressive boy with a thorn necklace around his neck. He wears this to stop him from lying as whenever he lies, he nearly throws up and the thorns stab him. He is voiced by Yoshimasa Hosoya in Japanese, and Joe Zieja in English.

=== Rin Obami ===
Rin Obami (尾喰 凜, Obami Rin) is the heir of the Obami family, specializing in lying and swindling. Aside from his typical obedient and friendly persona, he is a habitual liar that uses anyone for his benefit. Initially presented as Ibara's brother, it is later revealed that Ibara is a member of a branch family that accompanies him. Rin is voiced by Akira Ishida in Japanese, and Zach Aguilar in English.

=== Rei Batsubami ===
An anime-original character Rei Batsubami (×喰 零, Batsubami Rei) is an androgynous girl who arranges matches for the Momobami clan, preferring to stay out of gambling herself. Later revealed to be a servant from a fallen family within the Momobami clan who secretly planned to take control by running the 100 Votes Auction game. She is voiced by Romi Park in Japanese, and Laila Berzins in English.

== Other characters ==
=== Jun Kiwatari ===
Jun Kiwatari (木渡 潤, Kiwatari Jun) is an arrogant and rather violent male student who tried to force himself onto Yumeko. He later participates in the Debt Reassignment contest with Nanami against Yumeko and Mary constantly cheating. He eventually lost his nerve after Yumeko persuaded Nanami turn on him (due to his treatment of her) which resulted in his ultimate defeat. He is voiced by Hisao Egawa in Japanese, and Austin Lee Matthews in the Netflix English dub and Andrew Love in the Sentai Filmworks dub. He is portrayed by Yuma Yamoto in the live-action drama.

=== Nanami Tsubomi ===
Nanami Tsubomi (蕾 菜々美, Tsubomi Nanami) is Jun's pet. She used to have long hair until Jun cut it off resulting her sullen attitude. Yumeko and Mary help her retake her humanity and turn on Jun placing 4th in the Debt Reassignment contest. She is voiced by Yuka Iguchi in Japanese and Christine Marie Cabanos in the Netflix English dub and Hilary Haag in the Sentai Filmworks dub. She is portrayed by Kiyo Matsumoto in the live-action drama.

=== Kumagusu ===
Traditional Culture Club member. She is voiced by Haruka Shimizu in Japanese and Allegra Clark in the Netflix English dub and Kalin Coates in the Sentai Filmworks English dub.^{Ep. 1 credits}
