= Kakegurui (2018 TV series) =

Japanese drama television series

- Promotional release poster
- Also known as: Kakegurui
- Based on: Kakegurui – Compulsive Gambler by Homura Kawamoto; Tōru Naomura
- Opening theme: "Ichi ka Bachi ka" (一か八か) by Re:versed
- Ending theme: "Strawberry Feels" by BIGMAMA
- Country of origin: Japan
- Original language: Japanese
- No. of seasons: 2
- No. of episodes: 15

Original release
- Release: January 14, 2018 – April 29, 2019

Related
- Kakegurui (2017 TV series)

Kakegurui is a 2018 Japanese television drama based on the manga series of the same name. Released a year after an anime television series of the same name, the series was broadcast for ten episodes on MBS and TBS from January to March 2018; a second five-episode season was broadcast in April 2019. It was followed by a film adaptation, featuring the same actors, released in May 2019. The series became available for streaming on Netflix in the United States and United Kingdom in May 2018; in Japan in July 2018; and in the Philippines in February 2020.

== Plot ==
Hyakkaou Private Academy is a century-old prestigious institution. Students are ranked by their gambling winnings. Yumeko Jabami transfers to Hyakkaou Private Academy and disrupts the students' success.

== Cast ==
Main cast includes:

- Minami Hamabe as Yumeko Jabami
- Mahiro Takasugi as Ryota Suzui
- Aoi Morikawa as Mary Saotome
- Taishi Nakagawa as Kaede Manyuda
- Yuma Yamoto as Jun Kiwatari
- Natsume Mito as Runa Yomozuki
- Yurika Nakamura as Sayaka Igarashi
- Ruka Matsuda as Itsuki Sumeragi
- Natsumi Okamoto as Yuriko Nishinotouin
- Kiyo Matsumoto as Nanami Tsubomi
- Miki Yanagi as Midari Ikishima

Introduced in season 2 are the following actors:

- Sayuri Matsumura as Yumemi Yumemite
- Elaiza Ikeda as Kirari Momobami
  - Ikeda also plays Ririka Momobami

== Development and release ==
The live-action drama adaptation was first announced on November 21, 2017. The drama was first broadcast on MBS on January 14, 2018, and TBS' slot Dramaism on January 16, 2018.

The first season opening theme is sung by Re:versed titled "Ichi ka Bachi ka" (一か八か) while the theme song titled "Strawberry Feels" is sung by BIGMAMA. Tsutomu Hanabusa directed the drama.

After the live-action series premiered in Japan on January 14, 2018, it became available for streaming on Netflix in the United States and United Kingdom in early May, 2018. It became available in the Philippines on February 1, 2020, and Netflix Japan on July 2, 2018. The drama was streamed on Netflix in Japanese with subtitles including English, Spanish, Chinese, and Thai in May 2018.

In January 2019, the theme song "mummy mummy" for the second live-action season was released, by the rock band Bigmama. Passcode performed the opening song "Ichi ka Bachi ka" (All or Nothing). The second season premiered on April 1, 2019, on MBS and TBS, and ran for five episodes. The second season streamed on Netflix in July 2019. A film adaptation featuring the same actors was developed and released in May 2019.

== Series overview ==
Series	Episodes	Originally released	
Series	Episodes	First released	Last released
1	10	14 January 2018	19 March 2018
2	5	1 April 2019	29 April 2019

== Episodes ==
=== Season 1 (2018) ===
No. overall	No. in season	Title	Original release date
1	1	"Episode 1"	January 14, 2018
At a glance, Hyakkaou Private Academy is like a regular school for the wealthy, but this school holds a unique tradition: gambling is everything. The winners are crowned with glory and money, while the losers unable to pay are dehumanised to wear tags corresponding to either "Doggy" or "Kitty" depending on their gender and made to obey the rest of the student body. After losing greatly to the class queen Mary Saotome, Ryotā Suzui becomes a "Doggy". Everything changes when a beautiful new transfer student arrives in their class: Yumeko Jabami. On the first day of her transfer, Mary invites Yumeko to play an original game "Ballot Rock-Paper-Scissors", where every member of the class will draw one of the three symbols on a card for the players to draw and play rock-paper-scissors. Yumeko alternates between betting 2 and 50 chips, but eventually loses all her chips and uses real money in the form of 10 million yen to play against Mary for a final bet. Knowing that Mary is cheating, Yumeko turns the tides and wins, plunging Mary into debt. As she leaves, she thanks Suzui for making this a fun match, knowing that he had helped Mary by manipulating the majority of cards in the ballot, and gives him enough money to repay his debt.
2	2	"Episode 2"	January 21, 2018
Suzui is unsure about how he feels towards Yumeko, questioning her sanity. The next day, Mary is bullied after her great fall into debt. The student council, a group of elite and talented gamblers who rule the school, start to take note of Yumeko after this big upset. Itsuki Sumeragi, a first-year student council official and the daughter of the CEO of Japan's most famous toy company, challenges Yumeko to a game of "Double Concentration", where the players will have to rely on their memory to find the matching cards in both numbers and suits.
3	3	"Episode 3"	January 28, 2018
The first game ends with Yumeko losing 20 million yen, but Sumeragi agrees to play another round with her, confident that her special card symbols for cheating will work. On the second round, Yumeko bets her fingernails and toenails after Sumeragi reveals her love for nail art. However, Yumeko wins by a landslide instead after discovering her cheat from the very first round and memorising all the symbols and the cards they corresponded to. As she determines to play even more, Sumeragi bursts into tears and begs for mercy, and Yumeko leaves completely bored. After school, Suzui treats Yumeko to some confections.
4	4	"Episode 4"	February 4, 2018
After losing horribly to Yumeko, Sumeragi is kicked out of the student council. Mary, struck with fear and horror at becoming a Kitty, uses the only right of the Housepets to declare an official match against the leader of the Traditional Culture Research Society and student council third-year Yuriko Nishinotoin. They play an extremely high-stakes game "Life or Death", where the bet can be multiplied by 30 and subsequently subtracted or added on the opponent's end depending on the direction and number a set of designated mini swords fall on. Yumeko and Suzui stumble upon the game and watch Mary lose horribly, plunged even further into debt. This prompts Yumeko to play as well, and they bet 40 million. After playing one round, Yumeko insults Nishinotoin, angering the latter enough to open her slit eyes and play for real.
5	5	"Episode 5"	February 11, 2018
Student council secretary Sayaka Igarashi and member Runa Yomotsuki are seen carrying a ladder around the school. In the final round, Yumeko bets 40 chips and goes all in, placing them all on the number 24, much to Nishinotoin's horror. Yumeko reveals how she noticed two metal piercings on the right hands of every club member, and expresses disgust at how she makes her members engage in bodily harm for her to cheat. If one of the mini swords were magnetic, the dealer could then easily control the number it landed on. This also explains Yumeko's earlier provocation towards Nishinotoin so that they would definitely cheat. As Nishinotoin reels in shock, the student council vice-president and Sayaka enter to watch the match. As the cup is raised, Yumeko loses and becomes a Kitty with a 310 million yen debt, although she suspects that the student council had interfered with their match using a magnet underneath the Japanese-style room's floorboards to move the sword out of slit number 24. Knowing that only a crazy person would alter the building solely for such a purpose, and then deviously deceive both her allies and enemies, Yumeko resolves to gamble against the student council president.
6	6	"Episode 6"	February 18, 2018
Yumeko is cornered by Jun Kiwatari, a delinquent notorious for abusing his authority over Housepets. Suzui saves her by pretending that a student council member is approaching the area, and offers her 10 thousand yen to use, although she declines. In lieu of payment requests, both Mary and Yumeko have received Life Planners that will dictate their entire lives if they do not clear their debts. With the increasing numbers of Housepets the student council organises a Debt Exchange Game event, where students are classified into groups of four to play a series of two-card Indian poker, where the players will have the value of their debts exchanged depending on their rank in the game, with the overall No.1 being exempt from his/her debt. In addition, each player will have 10 chips each worth one-tenth of their entire debt. Mary and Yumeko are placed in the same group, along with Kiwatari and his favourite Kitty Nanami Tsubomi. Although Kiwatari does not have a debt, he reports having one of 10 million yen so as to gain some profit from the game. At first glance, Kiwatari seems to be winning and sees that Yumeko and Mary are working together. However, Mary bluffs him and successfully wins 5 million from a pig hand.
7	7	"Episode 7"	February 25, 2018
Mary and Yumeko continuously win bets with their clever bluffs. As Kiwatari panics, Yumeko reveals how the two of them have seen how Tsubomi's placement of her two cards indicate his suit, and as a result have been using that against him to win. Yumeko decides not to report their actions, and the game continues, transformed into a battle of bluffs. In the final round, Yumeko and Mary both bet for Tsubomi to win, prompting Kiwatari to force her to fold instead. Tsubomi recalls how she lost her will to fight after Kiwatari chopped off her beautiful long hair, and is inspired to rebel, deciding to call, and wins the round. Finally, the rankings are announced. Although it seems like Tsubomi has claimed first, and Mary and Yumeko have each placed third and fourth respectively, Mary is revealed to be the victor with 165 million yen, Tsubomi second with 94 million yen, Yumeko third with 73 million yen and lastly Kiwatari with 58 million yen. This is because prior to the game, Yumeko and Mary had swapped the values of the debts they reported, much like how he lied to have a debt, swapping the values of their chips as well. After the game, Suzui, who had received a 260 million yen cheque from the student council in place of the girls, returns it to them as he offers his congratulations.
8	8	"Episode 8"	March 5, 2018
Sayaka and Suzui both conclude that Yumeko cannot be moved nor manipulated by money. Mary decides to use 10 million to clear her debt and give the remaining money to Yumeko, who accepts but does not use it to repay her debt. Mary and student council treasurer Kaede Manyuda deduce that Yumeko intends on using the official match, to play with the student council president. Meanwhile, the president has left the school temporarily with the vice-president and is seen in a traditional Japanese house communicating via radio to members of her clan. Suzui inadvertently learns from Sayaka that Yumeko's parents are deceased and her older sister is hospitalised, leaving Yumeko to cover all expenses. Sumeragi requests from Mary that she would like to become an ally of theirs to become a student council official again, offering her large fortune as a pillar of support, much to Mary's chagrin. Manyuda resolves to take the president's seat, furious at Yumeko shattering the council's dignity, and recalls how beautification committee leader Midari Ikishima's left eye was taken by the president after she lost a gamble. Knowing how Ikishima is driven by her pursuit of pleasure, Manyuda lies that the president approved of her desire to gamble with Yumeko, and calls Mary's cellphone. Soon, Yumeko and Suzui are captured by members of the beautification committee.
9	9	"Episode 9"	March 12, 2018
10	10	"Episode 10"	March 19, 2018

=== Season 2 (2019) ===
No. overall	No. in season	Title	Original release date
11	1	"Episode 1"	April 1, 2019
Sayaka vets several articles written by Kyu Nitobe, the president of the academy's newspaper club, which highlights the disturbances Yumeko has caused all over campus. After being away from school for a long time, part-time idol and second-year council member Yumemi Yumemite returns to gamble with Yumeko. As Yumeko tears down Yumemi's mask of a cute girl and reveals her true nature to be a crass idol that hates her fans, the two raise their bet from a mere 50 million yen to both their lives: if Yumeko loses she will become an idol with Yumemi; if Yumemi loses their recorded conversation revealing her true nature will be released to all her fans, ending her career and dreams to become a future Oscar-winning actress.
12	2	"Episode 2"	April 8, 2019
Yumeko plays Saotome in Rock, Paper, Scissors Choice during the final of the Grand Meeting, meant to pool election votes. The game ended in a tie with both players choosing paper. Saotome then follows Yumeko to the presidents quarters where they share a kiss.
13	3	"Episode 3"	April 15, 2019
Yumemi's scheme doesn't go according to plan, forcing her to throw her fate to pure luck. Later, Yumemi reveals the existence of an unknown saboteur.
14	4	"Episode 4"	April 22, 2019
Yumeko challenges Manyuda to a public match. Unable to back out, he wagers the vast war chest in his control as student council treasurer.
15	5	"Episode 5"	April 29, 2019
Manyuda goes all-in, betting all of the funds in his control. Desperate to continue gambling, Yumeko pushes Itsuki to wager more than she can afford.
