= Kakegurui =

Japanese manga series by Homura Kawamoto

- Kakegurui – Compulsive Gambler
- First tankōbon volume cover, featuring Yumeko Jabami

賭ケグルイ (Kakegurui)
- Genre: Gambling; Psychological thriller
- Manga
- Written by: Homura Kawamoto
- Illustrated by: Tōru Naomura
- Published by: Square Enix
- English publisher: NA: Yen Press
- Imprint: GC Joker
- Magazine: Gangan Joker
- Original run: March 22, 2014 – present
- Volumes: 22
- Spin-off prequel manga
- Kakegurui Twin (2015–2023)
- Anime television series
- Kakegurui (2017–19)
- Live-action
- Kakegurui (2018–19 series); Kakegurui (2019 film); Kakegurui 2: Ultimate Russian Roulette (2021 film); Bet (2025 series)
- icon

Kakegurui – Compulsive Gambler (Japanese: 賭ケグルイ, Hepburn: Kakegurui) is a Japanese manga series written by Homura Kawamoto and illustrated by Tōru Naomura. It began serialization in Square Enix's Gangan Joker in March 2014, with its chapters additionally collected into twenty-two tankōbon volumes as of September 2026. In North America, the manga has been licensed for English-language release by Yen Press. The series has also inspired numerous spin-off manga, including a prequel titled Kakegurui Twin.

The story of Kakegurui – Compulsive Gambler takes place at Hyakkaou Private Academy, a prestigious school with a student hierarchy developed through gambling. Yumeko Jabami is a transfer student with a gambling addiction. By counteracting the cheating methods of other gamblers, Yumeko disrupts the students' success and status.

An anime television series adaptation by MAPPA aired in Japan from July to September 2017. A second season, titled Kakegurui ××, aired from January to March 2019. The anime series has been licensed and streamed by Netflix outside of Japan. Two light novels based on the manga have been released by Square Enix in August 2017 and March 2019, respectively. A live-action drama adaptation aired in Japan from January to March 2018, while a second season aired in April 2019. A video game adaptation was released in November 2018, but it became inaccessible after its servers were closed down in March 2020. A film adaptation featuring the same actors from the drama premiered in May 2019. A sequel to the film premiered in June 2021. Additionally, a loose Western adaptation of the manga titled Bet was released in 2025.

== Synopsis ==
=== Setting ===
Kakegurui – Compulsive Gambler is set at Hyakkaou Private Academy (私立百花王学園, Shiritsu Hyakka-ō Gakuen), a high-class elite school housing the children of Japan's wealthiest and most influential people, with many future leaders and professionals among the student body. However, the student hierarchy in this school is determined not by academic achievement or athletic ability but by gambling.

Students are ranked by their monetary contributions to the Student Council, fueling an intricate gambling system in which students freely bet their fortunes against one another after class. Those who win earn popularity, prestige and connections, while those who lose fall into debt, and become slaves to the whims of the remainder of the student body known as 'Pets', nicknamed "Fido" or "Mittens" ("Pochi" or "Mike" in the original) depending on gender and identified with a collar-like tag around their necks. Pets who are unable to clear their debts by graduation receive "Life Schedules" that dictate their futures as they work to pay them off.

=== Premise ===
Second-year student Yumeko Jabami is, at first glance, a beautiful, cheerful and intelligent high school girl who recently transferred to Hyakkaou Private Academy, but deep inside she is a compulsive gambler who simply gambles for the thrill of it, unlike the rest of the students from Hyakkaou who do so for financial or social gain. Unrestrained by rules or logic, and with an exceptional observation ability to see through gambling scams, she quickly disrupts the hierarchy of the school, drawing the attention of the Student Council, especially its president, Kirari Momobami, who takes interest in Yumeko.

== Media ==
=== Manga ===
Written by Homura Kawamoto and illustrated by Tōru Naomura, the manga series Kakegurui – Compulsive Gambler began its serialization in Square Enix's Gangan Joker anthology magazine on March 22, 2014. Square Enix has compiled and published its chapters into individual tankōbon volumes. The first volume was published on October 22, 2014. As of September 18, 2026, twenty-two volumes have been released.

At Anime Expo 2015, Yen Press announced that they had licensed the manga for English-language release in North America.

==== Spin-offs ====
A spin-off series, titled Kakegurui Twin, focused on Mary Saotome prior to the main story, is written by Kawamoto and illustrated by Kei Saiki. It began serialization in Square Enix's Gangan Joker on September 19, 2015. It ended on May 22, 2023. The manga has been licensed by Yen Press.

A 4-panel comedy spin-off written by Kawamoto and illustrated by Taku Kawamura, titled Kakegurui (Kakkokari) (賭ケグルイ（仮）), was serialized in Gangan Joker from December 22, 2016, to September 22, 2022. Its chapters are collected and published by Square Enix into individual tankōbon volumes. The first volume was published on June 22, 2017, and ten volumes have been released as of July 22, 2023.

Another spin-off, titled Kakegurui Midari (賭ケグルイ 妄), which focuses on Midari Ikishima, was written by Kawamoto and illustrated by Yūichi Hiiragi. It was serialized on Square Enix app Manga Up! from February 21, 2017, to May 19, 2020. Square Enix compiled its chapters into four tankōbon volumes.

=== Anime ===
An anime television series animated by MAPPA aired from July 1 to September 23, 2017, on Tokyo MX, MBS and other channels. Yuichiro Hayashi directed the series, Yasuko Kobayashi handled the scripts, and Manabu Akita handled the character designs. TECHNOBOYS PULCRAFT GREEN-FUND composed the music for the series. The opening theme, "Deal with the Devil", is performed by Tia. D-Selections performed the ending theme "LAYon-theLINE". The series ran for 12 episodes. The series is licensed and streamed outside of Japan by Netflix, while Anime Limited acquired the series for release on home video in the United Kingdom and Ireland. Sentai Filmworks released the anime on Blu-ray on November 30, 2021, with a new English dub.

A second season, titled Kakegurui ××, aired from January 8 to March 26, 2019, on MBS, TV Aichi, and other channels. The cast reprised their roles, and the staff returned for the second season. Kiyoshi Matsuda joined Yuichiro Hayashi as director for the second season. The second season's opening theme song "Kono Yubi Tomare" (コノユビトマレ) is performed by JUNNA, and the ending theme song "AlegriA" is performed by D-selections. The second season ran for 12 episodes. Netflix released season 2 outside of Japan on June 13, 2019.

=== Light novels ===
A light novel titled Kakegurui Trip (小説賭ケグルイ悦), written by Hikaru Muno (Kawamoto's younger brother) and illustrated by Naomura, was published on August 22, 2017, by Square Enix. A second light novel titled Kakegurui Joker (小説賭ケグルイ戯) also written by Muno and illustrated by Naomura, was published on March 22, 2019, by Square Enix.

=== Drama ===
==== Japanese series ====
A Japanese television drama adaptation was first announced on November 21, 2017. The drama, directed by Tsutomu Hanabusa, was first broadcast on MBS on January 14, 2018, and TBS' slot Dramaism on January 16, 2018. The opening theme is "Ichi ka Bachi ka" (一か八か), performed by Re:versed, while the ending theme song is "Strawberry Feels", performed by Bigmama.

After the live-action series premiered in Japan on January 14, 2018, it became available for streaming on Netflix in the United States and United Kingdom in early May, 2018. It became available in the Philippines on February 1, 2020, and Netflix Japan on July 2, 2018. The drama was streamed on Netflix in Japanese with subtitles including English, Spanish, Chinese, and Thai in May 2018.

In January 2019, the theme song "Mummy Mummy" for the second live-action season was released, by the rock band Bigmama. Passcode performed the opening song "Ichi ka Bachi ka" ("All or Nothing"). The second season premiered on April 1, 2019, on MBS and TBS, and ran for five episodes. The second season streamed on Netflix in July 2019.

==== English-language series ====
In May 2024, it was announced that a live-action English-language drama series adaptation, titled Bet, was in production and ordered at Netflix. Produced in Canada by Boat Rocker Studios, Simon Barry was the showrunner for the series, which starred Miku Martineau, Ayo Solanke, Eve Edwards, Clara Alexandrova, Hunter Cardinal, Anwen O'Driscoll, Aviva Mongillo and Ryan Sutherland. It debuted on Netflix on May 15, 2025. In contrast to prior Japanese live-action versions, the producers' objective was to create a reinterpretation for a Western viewership that remains authentic to the original series' essence, rather than a direct adaptation. In June 2025, Netflix renewed the series for a second season.

=== Theatrical films ===
In August 2018, it was announced that a live-action film adaptation of Kakegurui – Compulsive Gambler would premiere in 2019. It features the same actors from the television drama, and stars Minami Hamabe as the protagonist Yumeko Jabami, along with Mahiro Takasugi, Aoi Morikawa and Elaiza Ikeda as Ryota Suzui, Mary Saotome and Kirari Momobami, respectively. The film, directed by Hanabusa Tsutomu and distributed by GAGA Pictures, was officially released in Japan on May 3, 2019.

On August 29, 2020, a sequel to the first movie was announced to be released in 2021, with Hanabusa as the film's director, and also co-wrote the screenplay along with Minato Takano. The sequel, titled Kakegurui 2: Ultimate Russian Roulette, features a returning cast set to reprise their roles from the first film. It premiered on June 1, 2021.

=== Video game ===
On July 14, 2017, registration started on the official website for a video game adaptation entitled Kakegurui: Cheating Allowed (賭ケグルイ チーティングアロード), which was developed by Wizcorp and Crossover for the iOS and Android systems. On December 28, 2017, it was announced on the game's official Twitter (now X) account that its original release was delayed to November 20, 2018, to improve the gameplay, which features a gambling system similar to that shown in the manga. On March 27, 2020, the servers were officially closed down and the game became inaccessible.

On March 7, 2025, pre-registration began on CTW's browser gaming platform G123 for Kakegurui All In, a strategy-based sugoroku online browser game.

== Reception ==
By February 2019, the manga had over 5 million copies in circulation; it had over 6.2 million copies in circulation by July 2021; and over 6.8 million copies in circulation by June 2022.

== See also ==
- Gambling in Japan
