= Yurika Nakamura =

Yurika Nakamura may refer to:

- Yurika Nakamura (runner)
- Yurika Nakamura (actress)
