= Kakegurui 2: Ultimate Russian Roulette =

- Directed by: Tsutomu Hanabusa
- Written by: Mizuto Takano, Tsutomu Hanabusa
- Based on: Kakegurui – Compulsive Gambler by: Homura Kawamoto; Tōru Naomura
- Produced by: Yoda Tatsumi
- Starring: Minami Hamabe; Fuiji Ryusei; Mahiro Takasugi; Aoi Morikawa; Ruka Matsuda; Yurika Nakamura; Mito Natsume
- Distributed by: GAGA Pictures
- Release date: June 1, 2021
- Running time: 119 minutes
- Country: Japan
- Language: Japanese
- Box office: $1.1 million

Kakegurui 2: Ultimate Russian Roulette ( Japanese: 映画 賭ケグルイ 絶体絶命ロシアンルーレット ) is a 2021 Japanese live-action film directed by Hanabusa Tsutomu. It is a sequel to Kakegurui and is based on the manga series of the same name by Homura Kawamoto and illustrated by Tōru Naomura. It was released on June 1, 2021.

== Cast ==
- Minami Hamabe as Yumeko Jabami
- Fujii Ryusei as Shikigami Makuro
- Mahiro Takasugi as Ryota Suzui
- Aoi Morikawa as Mary Saotome
- Ruka Matsuda as Itsuki Sumeragi
- Yurika Nakamura as Sayaka Igarashi
- Elaiza Ikeda as Kirari Momobami and Ririka Momobami
- Taishi Nakagawa as Uchijima
- Sayuri Matsumura as Yumemi Yumemite
- Miki Yanagi as Midari Ikishima
- Natsumi Okamoto as Yuriko Nishinotouin
- Mito Natsume as Runa Yomozuki
- Yuma Yamoto as Jun Kiwatari

== Production ==
In August 2020, the creators of the first live-action movie shared that a sequel is in the works, scheduled for a 2021 release in Japan. The cast from the previous film were returning to reprise their role. Tsutomu Hanabusa was set to direct the film once again and collaborate on the screenplay, along with Minato Takano. The story is completely original and is fully supervised by the original author, Homura Kawamoto.

A trailer was launched in March 2021, revealing the release date of April 29 and the official movie title, "Kakegurui the Movie: Desperate Russian Roulette." The film includes a new antagonist, named Makuro Shikigami, played by Ryūsei Fujii.

The film's scheduled April 29 release date was being postponed due to COVID-19. They later announced that the new release date would be on May 12. The staff decided to delay the film again to the extended state of emergency in Japan. The film was officially set to premiere on June 21.

Taishi Nakagawa would not reprise his role of the series but he would appear in the film as a new original character named Uchijima.
