= Kakegurui (film) =

2019 Japanese film

- Film poster
- Kanji: 賭ケグルイ
- Revised Hepburn: Kakegurui
- Directed by: Tsutomu Hanabusa
- Written by: Mizuto Takano, Tsutomu Hanabusa
- Based on: Kakegurui – Compulsive Gambler by: Homura Kawamoto; Tōru Naomura
- Produced by: Takeshi Matsushita; Tatsuya Iwakura
- Starring: Minami Hamabe; Mahiro Takasugi; Aoi Morikawa; Ruka Matsuda; Yurika Nakamura; Mito Natsume
- Cinematography: Takashi Komatsu
- Edited by: Naoichiro Sagara
- Music by: Michiru
- Production company: Dub, Inc.
- Distributed by: GAGA Pictures
- Release date: May 3, 2019
- Running time: 120 minutes
- Country: Japan
- Language: Japanese
- Box office: $2.6 million

Kakegurui (Japanese: 賭ケグルイ) is a 2019 Japanese film adaptation of a manga series of the same name by Homura Kawamoto and Tōru Naomura. It is directed by Tsutomu Hanabusa, distributed by GAGA Pictures, and stars Minami Hamabe and Mahiro Takasugi as Yumeko Jabami and Ryota Suzui, respectively. It was released in Japan on May 3, 2019.

A sequel, entitled Ultimate Russian Roulette, was released on June 1, 2021.

== Plot ==
Hyakkaou Private Academy is a prestigious institution for the privileged, and was first established 122 years ago. The students there are ranked by their gambling winnings. The winners receive everything including fame and fortune. The winners also dominate the losers. One day, transfer student Yumeko Jabami arrives at the academy, quickly showing she is a gambling maniac who loves high stakes.

== Cast ==
- Minami Hamabe as Yumeko Jabami
- Mahiro Takasugi as Ryota Suzui
- Aoi Morikawa as Mary Saotome
- Ruka Matsuda as Itsuki Sumeragi
- Yurika Nakamura as Sayaka Igarashi
- Elaiza Ikeda as Kirari Momobami and Ririka Momobami
- Taishi Nakagawa as Kaede Manyuda
- Sayuri Matsumura as Yumemi Yumemite
- Miki Yanagi as Midari Ikishima
- Natsumi Okamoto as Yuriko Nishinotouin
- Mito Natsume as Runa Yomozuki
- Yuma Yamoto as Jun Kiwatari
- Kiyo Matsumoto as Nanami Tsubomi
- Haruka Fukuhara as Jueri Arukibi
- Hio Miyazawa as Amane Murasame
- Marika Itō as Tomu Inuhachi
- Akira Onodera as Kyu Nitobe

== Reception ==
According to The Japan Times, the "production values are high: "The film's high school resembles a casino for high rollers in a 007 and a political flick." It also called the tone "more comically ironic than melodramatically overwrought."

Kakegurui grossed $2.6 million at the box office.
