= Silent Love (2024 film) =

- Directed by: Eiji Uchida
- Written by: Eiji Uchida; Yukiko Manabe
- Produced by: Tsuyoshi Matsushita; Kazuhiro Yokoyama; Hiromasa Tamai; Tomoharu Kusunoki
- Starring: Ryosuke Yamada; Minami Hamabe
- Cinematography: Shin'ya Kimura
- Music by: Joe Hisaishi
- Production company: Gaga Corporation
- Distributed by: Gaga Corporation
- Release date: January 26, 2024
- Running time: 116 minutes
- Country: Japan
- Language: Japanese

Silent Love (サイレントラブ, Sairento Rabu) is a 2024 Japanese film directed by Eiji Uchida. The film stars Ryosuke Yamada and Minami Hamabe as a mute man and blind woman who grow close despite their disparate backgrounds. The film was released in Japan on January 26, 2024.

== Plot ==
Aoi works as a custodian at the Yokohama College of Music. He is unable to speak after being stabbed in the throat while saving a friend, killing the assailant. One day, he saves a bandaged student, Mika, from jumping off the roof, and she leaves behind a chime. After being hit by a car and losing her eyesight, Mika is despondent about her piano career. Aoi encounters Mika again as she visits an old lecture hall to practice, helping her to access it, and she thinks him to be another piano student. After undergoing eye surgery and feeling less numbness in her arms, Mika is determined to continue her pursuit of becoming a pianist.

Yuma is a man of upper-class upbringing that idly plays the piano and is deep in gambling debt at a casino. Aoi makes an arrangement with him to play the piano in his place in return for payment. As Mika requests Aoi to hear more of this playing, Aoi takes on a night job at a junkyard. One day, the three take a day trip together, and Mika reveals to Yuma that she knew he was the piano player all along. Aoi walks in on Yuma kissing Mika, and he is heartbroken.

Keisuke, Aoi's close friend, suspects Yuma of extorting Aoi for money, and pays the casino to rough him up. While Yuma apologizes to Mika, they are both kidnapped. At an abandoned warehouse, a gangster who hates the wealthy stabs Yuma in the hand so he can no longer play the piano. Aoi arrives and takes on the gang using his fighting training. As Yuma is about to be attacked again, Mika swings at the gangster with a pipe, but hits Yuma instead. Aoi takes responsibility for the attack and is arrested. Aoi, through Keisuke, relays a message to Mika telling her to forget him due to his criminal past. Mika visits a recuperating Yuma at the hospital, asking to stay by his side.

Two years later, Mika makes her debut as a professional pianist with Yuma's help. Yuma, despite not wanting to lose Mika, divulges Aoi's whereabouts to her. Mika goes to the dock that Aoi now works at as a ship cleaner, searching for him. However, when she asks around for him, Aoi hides from her. When Mika hears the chime, which Aoi still wears, she is almost hit by a truck, and is saved by Aoi. The two kiss as they are reunited.

== Cast ==
- Ryosuke Yamada as Aoi Sawada
- Minami Hamabe as Mika Jinnai
- Shūhei Nomura as Yuma Kitamura
- Kaito Yoshimura as Keisuke Nakano
- Sway as Yokomichi, a gangster
- Ayumu Nakajima as Kodō, a casino employee
- Wan Marui as Yayoi Kirino, Aoi and Keisuke's friend
- Takurō Tatsumi
- Arata Furuta as Ippei, Aoi's fellow custodian

== Release ==
Silent Love was directed and co-written by Eiji Uchida, with Yukiko Manabe as co-writer. The score was composed by Joe Hisaishi. The band Mrs. Green Apple created a theme song for the film, titled "Nachtmusik". The film was released in Japan on January 26, 2024, by Gaga Corporation.

== Reception ==
Mark Schilling of The Japan Times called Silent Love "antiquated and artificial, devolving into cliched action". Elsewehere, Korea Times writer Baek Byung-yeul praised the film's "heartwarming story that goes beyond boundaries," while also noting the film's "emotional depth" and the lead actors' "nuanced performances that authentically express their characters' struggles and joys."

The film grossed $1.44M (¥212.2M) in its opening weekend.
