= ReLIFE (film) =

- Poster
- Japanese: リライフ
- Directed by: Takeshi Furusawa
- Screenplay by: Kumiko Asō
- Based on: ReLIFE by Yayoiso
- Produced by: Kazuo Nakanishi
- Starring: Taishi Nakagawa; Yūna Taira; Mahiro Takasugi; Elaiza Ikeda; Sae Okazaki; Yudai Chiba
- Cinematography: Yasushi Hanamura
- Edited by: Seiji Harimoto
- Music by: Yusuke Hayashi
- Production companies: C&I Entertainment; Culture Entertainment; Dentsu; Earth Star Entertainment; NHN Comico; Nippon Shuppan Hanbai (Nippan) K.K.; Parco Co., Ltd.; Shochiku; TMS Entertainment
- Distributed by: Shochiku
- Release date: 15 April 2017
- Running time: 119 minutes
- Country: Japan
- Language: Japanese
- Box office: ¥218,000,000

ReLIFE (リライフ) is a Japanese science fiction drama film directed by Takeshi Furusawa, starring Taishi Nakagawa and based on the manga series of the same name by Yayoiso. It was released in Japan by Shochiku on 15 April 2017. The theme song for the film is "Sakura" by Sonoko Inoue, the cover of Ketsumeishi's 2005 single.

== Synopsis ==
Arata Kaizaki (Taishi Nakagawa) is 27-years-old and unemployed. He quit his prior job after working for the company for 3 months. Arata decides to take part in a research program. He takes medication that makes him look younger and he is to attend high school for a year. There, he falls in love with female high school student Chizuru Hishiro (Yūna Taira)

== Cast ==
- Taishi Nakagawa as Arata Kaizaki
- Yūna Taira as Chizuru Hishiro
- Mahiro Takasugi as Kazuomi Ōga
- Elaiza Ikeda as Rena Kariu
- Sae Okazaki as An Onoya
- Yudai Chiba as Ryō Yoake
- Kenshō Ono (cameo)
