= Rainbow Days (film) =

- Theatrical release poster

Japanese name
- Kanji: 虹色デイズ
Transcriptions
- Revised Hepburn: Nijiiro Deizu
- Directed by: Ken Iizuka
- Written by: Rika Nezu
- Based on: Rainbow Days by Minami Mizuno
- Starring: Reo Sano; Taishi Nakagawa; Mahiro Takasugi; Ryusei Yokohama; Ai Yoshikawa; Yuri Tsunematsu; Mayu Hotta; Nozomi Bando; Yūki Yamada
- Production company: Shochiku
- Distributed by: Shochiku
- Release date: July 6, 2018 (Japan)
- Running time: 110 minutes
- Country: Japan
- Language: Japanese
- Box office: ¥110 million

Rainbow Days (Japanese: 虹色デイズ, Hepburn: Nijiiro Deizu) is a 2018 Japanese coming-of-age drama and romance film based on the manga of the same name by Minami Mizuno. The film is directed by Ken Iizuka and was released in Japan on July 6, 2018, by Shochiku.

== Plot ==
Four best friends — pure-hearted Natsuki Hashiba, ladies' man Tomoya Matsunaga, otaku Tsuyoshi Naoe, and sadistic Keiichi Katakura — approach their second year of high school. During spring, Natsuki works up the courage to talk to Anna Kobayakawa, who lends him her hand towel after he falls into a puddle. His attempt to return it to her fails when he is intercepted by her protective best friend, Mari Tsutsui. The boys make a bet for Natsuki to ask Anna out by the end of the semester, and he succeeds in getting her Line ID, to Mari's anger.

In the summer, Natsuki, Tomoya, and Keiichi fail their exams and seek help from Tsuyoshi and his girlfriend Yukiko Asai, to which they also invite Anna. Later, Yukiko discovers that Tsuyoshi plans on applying to a university in Tokyo. After the boys pass their remedial exams, they go to a summer festival with the girls. While Natsuki grows closer to Anna, Tomoya learns that Mari fears that he will steal Anna away. In the fall, during guidance counseling, Tsuyoshi becomes conflicted over choosing between his college choices and his relationship with Yukiko. Anna becomes confused when she sees that Natsuki's classmate, Chiba, is close to him, and she is later saved from unwanted advances from another boy when Keiichi pretends to be her boyfriend.

In the winter, Tomoya distracts Mari from interrupting Natsuki and Anna's day out and later invites her to a Christmas party. Mari attends, but discovers it is a surprise birthday party for her planned by Natsuki and Anna. Upset, she runs off, causing everyone to look for her. When Tomoya finds her, she confesses that she feels she is no longer Anna's closest friend, and he kisses her. Meanwhile, Natsuki develops a fever during the search and accidentally kisses Anna. After winter break, Natsuki and Anna's relationship becomes awkward, while Tomoya admits to Mari that he has fallen in love with her. Mari is knocked unconscious when she walks away from him, and after carrying her to the nurse's office, Tomoya tells Mari's older brother, Masaomi, that he is confident in winning her over. Masaomi conveys this to Mari, and she realizes how genuine his feelings are after Tomoya confirms he has deleted phone numbers from other girls.

As the boys become third year students with the arrival of spring, Anna overhears Natsuki helping Chiba rehearse for their play at the cultural festival, misinterpreting their conversation as a love confession. She begins to ignore him, putting distance between the two. Keiichi tells the boys that he will pursue Anna if Natsuki doesn't, causing Tomoya and him to get into a fight. Once Tsuyoshi warns Natsuki that Keiichi is going to confess to Anna, he chases after them. Revealing his threat to be a ruse, Keiichi gives Natsuki and Anna time together in the planetarium exhibit, where they confess their love to each other and kiss. Outside, everyone has discovered the rain has stopped and a rainbow has formed in the sky.

In a mid-credits scene, the boys jump into the school's swimming pool and later graduate from high school.

== Cast ==
- Reo Sano as Natsuki Hashiba
- Taishi Nakagawa as Tomoya Matsunaga
- Mahiro Takasugi as Tsuyoshi Naoe
- Ryusei Yokohama as Keiichi Katakura
- Ai Yoshikawa as Anna Kobayakawa
- Yuri Tsunematsu as Mari Tsutsui
- Mayu Hotta as Yukiko Asai
- Nozomi Bando as Reiko Chiba
- Yuki Yamada as Masaomi Tsutsui
- Kenichi Takitō as Professor Tabuchi

== Production ==
A live-action film adaptation for Rainbow Days was announced in October 2017 and slated for a summer 2018 release, which was later confirmed to be July 6, 2018. It stars Generations from Exile Tribe member Reo Sano, Taishi Nakagawa, Mahiro Takasugi, and Ryusei Yokohama. In January 2018, additional cast members for the female characters were revealed. The film is directed by Ken Iizuka and written by Rika Nezu.

The theme song of Rainbow Days is "Wanderlust" by Dragon Ash. Kenji Furuya, the vocalist of the band, wrote the song specifically for the film. Insert songs for the film include "Niji" and "Baumkuchen" by Fujifabric, "17-sai no Uta" by Mao Abe, "Your Song" by Super Beaver, and "Gunjō" by Leola. Shōgo Kaida composed "Gunjō" while Ken Iizuka, the film's director, wrote the lyrics.

Filming took place from mid-October to November 2017. The staff borrowed a traditional house built 100 years ago to use as Tsuyoshi's room, filling it with anime and manga memorabilia including The Girl Who Leapt Through Time, Summer Wars, and the Rebuild of Evangelion film series.

Rainbow Days was released in 317 theaters across Japan on July 6, 2018. The film was also screened with English subtitles at the Japanese Film Festival 2018 in Australia.

== Reception ==
Rainbow Days opened at #3 on opening weekend and sold 87,000 tickets with a box office gross of ¥110 million.
