= Saki (film) =

- Poster
- Kanji: 咲-Saki-
- Directed by: Yūichi Onuma
- Screenplay by: Hayashi Mori
- Based on: Saki by Ritz Kobayashi
- Starring: Minami Hamabe
- Distributed by: Presidio Corporation
- Release date: 3 February 2017
- Country: Japan
- Language: Japanese

Saki (咲-Saki-) (lit. "Good hope") is a Japanese film based on the manga series of the same name written and illustrated by Ritz Kobayashi. The film is directed by Yūichi Onuma, written by Hayashi Mori and stars Minami Hamabe as the title character Saki Miyanaga. It was released in Japan by Presidio Corporation on 3 February 2017.

== Cast ==
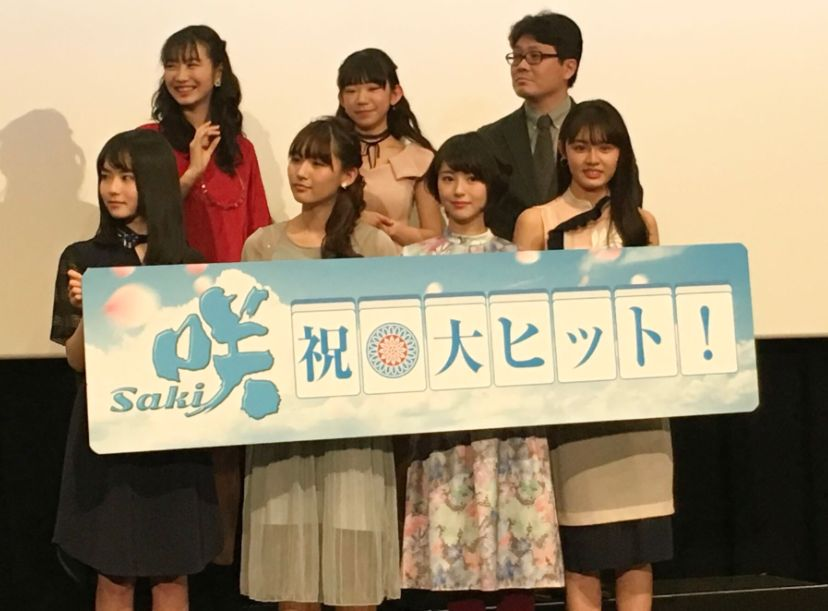
The cast of Saki during the films press release

- Minami Hamabe as Saki Miyanaga
- Nana Asakawa as Nodoka Haramura
- Aika Hirota as Yūki Kataoka
- Mai Kikuchi as Koromo Amae
- Rena Takeda as Kana Ikeda
- Seika Furuhata as Hisa Takei
- Anna Yamada as Mako Someya
- Mariya Nagao as Tōka Ryūmonbuchi
- Kyōka Shibata as Hajime Kunihiro
- Ena Koshino as Jun Inoue
- Rie Kaneko as Tomoki Sawamura
- Mami Kamura as Mihoko Fukuji
- Aya Yoshizaki as Miharu Yoshitome
- Mizuki Hoshina as Sumiyo Fukabori
- Yuzu Higuchi as Seika Bundō
- Natsumi Okamoto as Yumi Kajiki
- Ano as Momoko Tōyoko
- Aguri Ōnishi as Satomi Kanbara
- Marina Nagasawa as Kaori Senō
- Mari Yamachi as Mutsuki Tsuyama
- Natsuna Watanabe as Yasuko Fujita
- Hinako Sano as Takako Kubo
- Yūki Tamaki as Hagiyoshi
