= Gangoose =

- Film poster
- Directed by: Yu Irie
- Written by: Yu Irie; Kiyoto Wada
- Based on: Gangoose by Keisuke Hiya
- Produced by: Yu Irie
- Starring: Mahiro Takasugi; Ryō Katō; Daichi Watanabe
- Music by: Shogo Kaida
- Production companies: Amuse Inc. Pipeline
- Distributed by: Kino Films; Kinoshita Group
- Release date: 23 November 2018 (Japan)
- Running time: 120 minutes
- Country: Japan
- Language: Japanese

Gangoose (Japanese: ギャングース) is a 2018 Japanese crime drama film directed by Yu Irie, starring Mahiro Takasugi, Ryō Katō and Daichi Watanabe. A live action adaptation of the manga of the same name, it follows three young men who steal from criminals to survive.

== Cast ==
- Mahiro Takasugi as Saike
- Ryō Katō as Kazuki
- Daichi Watanabe as Takeo
- Kento Hayashi as Takada
- Aoi Ito as Hikari
- Maika Yamamoto as Yuki
- Sumire Ashina as Sakura
- Kastuya as Kawai
- Hannya as Shinji
- Ken Sugawara as Manabe
- Shota and Keita Saito as the Ebina brothers
- Nobuaki Kaneko as Karo
- Mariko Shinoda as Ageha
- Miyavi as Adashi
- Daisuke Nendo
- Ron Mizuma
- Shunya Itabashi as Eto Kohei
- Kota Yamaguchi
- Ryotaro Sakaguchi as Takeshi Enomoto
- Fumina Suzuki as Chika
- Rion Takahashi
- Kojima Shuji as Boy in Juvenile Training School
- Makito Uchida
- Sumire Ashina as Sakura
- Ikuma Nagatomo as Salaryman
- Risa Kameda
- Masaki Naito as Instructor
- Hiroko Terada as Courier
- Yu Yasuda
- Shoji Omiya as Truck Driver
- Takuro Kodama
- Koji Mitzumizo

== Production ==
It was announced in January 2018 that Keisuke Hiya's manga Gangoose was to receive a live-action film adaptation. Yu Irie was announced as the director while Mahiro Takasugi, Ryō Katō and Daichi Watanabe were cast as the leads. Irie had spent several years preparing for the project. Work on the script only began after the completion of the manga, as he did not feel comfortable starting on the script without knowing what the conclusion would be. In writing the script, Irie wished to convey the fact that there are youths in real life who, like the protagonists, are forced to become criminals to survive. He claimed to have consulted over 10 individuals on the matter, including a documentary filmmaker who covered child welfare facilities. To prepare for their roles, Takasugi, Katō and Watanabe had several meetings with Daisuke Suzuki, the author of the non-fiction book on which the manga is based. Principal photography began on 20 January and wrapped in late February. Watanabe wrote, composed, produced and sang the lead vocals for CRYBABY, which was used as the film's theme song.

== Release ==
The film screened at the 31st Tokyo International Film Festival, which was held from late October to early November 2018. It premiered at the Toho Cinemas Shinjuku theatre on 13 November before opening in theatres across Japan on 23 November.

== Reception ==
Haruhiko Ueshima of Kinema Junpo gave the film a 4/5 rating, calling it a "proper crime drama". Ueshima opined that Irie's worldview aligns with that of the manga. Takashi Ueno and Morumotto Yoshida, also of Kinema Junpo, both gave the film a 3/5 rating. Ueno praised Katō's performance as well as Miyavi's presence and choreography, though he felt that some scenes ran for too long and that the emotional scenes could have been "toned down." Yoshida similarly praised Katō's performance, though he felt that the film was too "bland" and "lacking in dramatic excitement."

Mark Schilling of The Japan Times rated the film 2 stars out of 5 and opined that Irie's attempts to introduce serious themes "feels strained and even absurd" given that the film "promises caper comedy". He further argued that the action "takes flight into the realm of kiddie fantasy", which "undercuts the film's pretenses to social realism."

For his work on the film, Irie was nominated for the Best Action Director award at the 2019 Japan Action Awards, held on 6 April.
