= Maki Meguro =

Japanese actress

Maki Meguro (目黒真希 Meguro Maki, born July 27, 1972, in Miyagi Prefecture) is a Japanese actress. She starred in the 2009 Yuya Ishii film To Walk Beside You (君と歩こう, Kimi to arukō). She also played a supporting role in the 2016 film Magic Utopia (マジックユートピア).
