= Mayumi Yamamoto (actress) =

Japanese actress

- Born: May 11, 1984 (age 41)
- Occupation: Actress

Mayumi Yamamoto (山本真由美 Yamamoto Mayumi; born May 11, 1984) is a Japanese actress.

== Filmography ==
=== Television ===
- Kanjani Knight (Guest appearance)
- 幽霊(ゴースト)ママ (Regular cast member)
- 新・京都迷宮案内
- てるてる家族 (Teruteru Kazoku)
- GET01 (Regular cast member)
- エンタメニュースショー GET (Entamenyuusushou)
- おしえて (Oshiete)

=== Feature films ===
- Ashita wa Kitto... (2001)
- Anata ni Fusawashii (2020)
