= Taishi Nakagawa =

Japanese actor (born 1998)

- 中川 大志
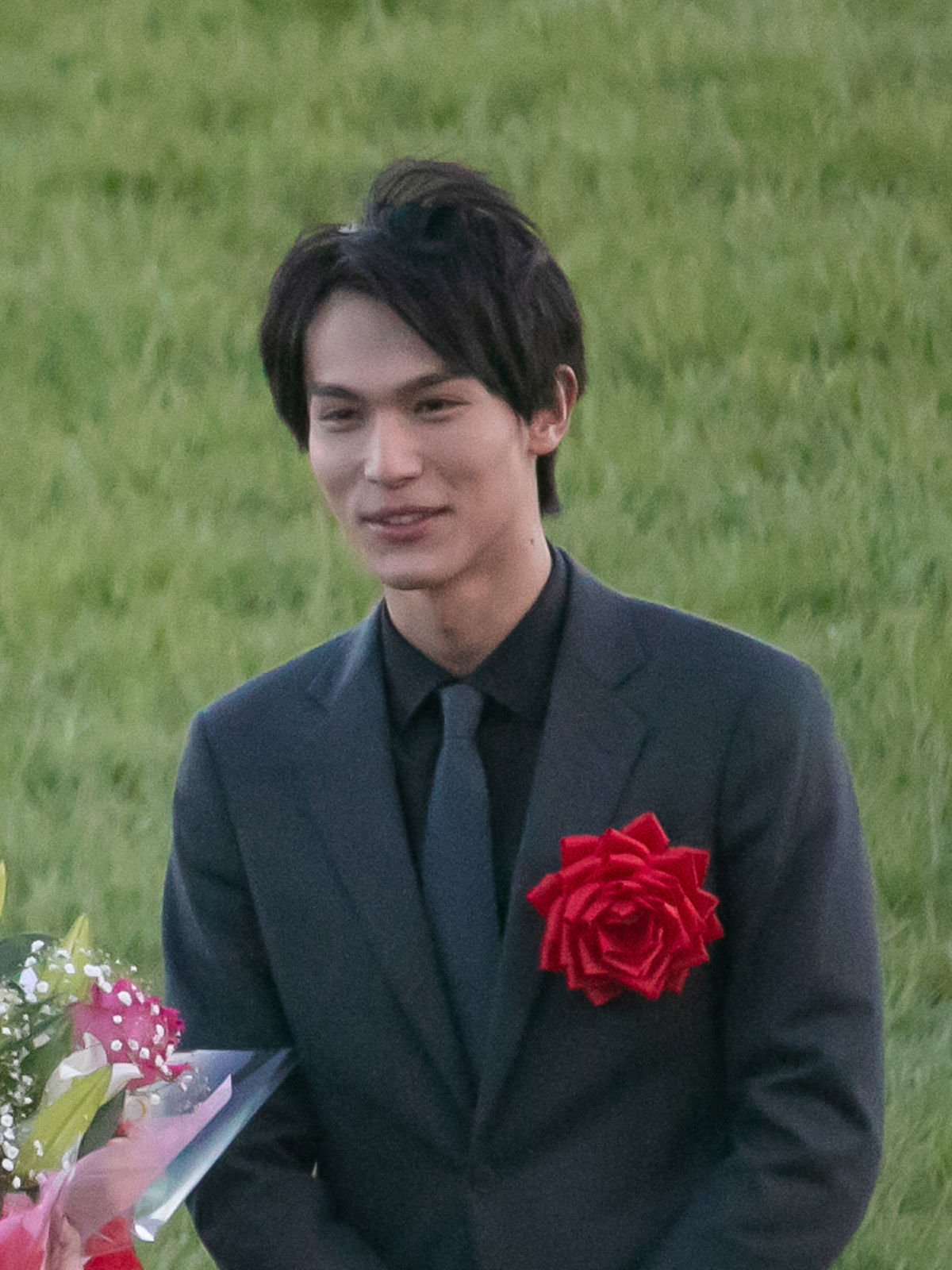
- Nakagawa at Nakayama Racecourse in 2018
- Born: June 14, 1998 (age 28); Tokyo, Japan
- Occupations: Actor; host; model
- Years active: 2009–present
- Agent: Stardust Promotion
- Height: 179 cm (5 ft 10 in)
- Website: taishi-nakagawa.com

Taishi Nakagawa (中川 大志, Nakagawa Taishi; born June 14, 1998) is a Japanese actor, host, and model. He is best known for his leading role as Yuiji Kira in the live action Kyō no Kira-kun, and Tenma Hase in the series Boys Over Flowers Season 2.

== Biography ==
Due to his sudden growth spurt, Nakagawa had roles that were much older than him. He starred in the drama re-enactment for the television documentary When I Was a Child, featuring Japanese actors and actresses in their childhood. He has appeared in several dramas, including Team Batista 2: General Rouge no Gaisen, Q10, Gō, and Ohisama. He starred in the hit drama Kaseifu no Mita as one of the four children struggling to cope with the death of their mother.

Nakagawa played the bullied student in the 2012 remake of Great Teacher Onizuka. He played an MC on the TV Tokyo series Oha Suta.

He appeared in The Comedy of Life (LIFE!〜人生に捧げるコント〜), a comedy skit show about joy and sorrow of life in an omnibus format, having appeared on the show since 2017.

== Filmography ==
=== Television dramas ===
Year	Title	Role	Notes	Ref.
2009	When I was a Child	Ikki Sawamura (young)	Documentary drama	
2010	Team Batista 2: General Rouge no Gaisen	young Hiroyuki Tsukada	Episode 3	
2010	Q10		Episode 4	
2011	Gō	Hosokawa Mitsuchiyo	Taiga drama, episode 34	
2011	Sunshine	young Haruki Sudo	Asadora, episodes 1–6, 15, 20	
2011	I'm Mita, Your Housekeeper.	Kakeru Asuda		
2012	13-sai no Hello Work	Junichi Mikami		
2012	Blackboard: Yume	Kenji Yumioka	TV movie	
2012	Taira no Kiyomori	Minamoto no Yoritomo (young)	Taiga drama, episodes 24–28	
2012	GTO 2012	Noboru Yoshikawa		
2012	GTO Aki mo Oni Abar Supesharu!	Noboru Yoshikawa	TV movie	
2012	Hana no Kanmuri	Sakura Hirai	Lead role, TV movie	
2012	Perfect Blue	Shinya Morooka		
2013	GTO New Year Special	Noboru Yoshikawa	TV movie	
2013	Yakou Kanransha	Shinji Takahashi		
2013	GTO Final Volume - Farewell Onizuka! Graduation Special	Noboru Yoshikawa	TV movie	
2013	Doctors 2: The Ultimate Surgeon	Masaya Minagawa	Episode 3	
2014	Konya wa Kokoro Dake Daite	Toru Motomiya		
2014	Water Polo Yankees	Kohei Shimura		
2014	Kindaichi Shonen no Jikenbo N (neo)	Koji Sanada	Episode 1	
2014	Hell Teacher Nube	Hiroshi Tateno		
2015	Replay & Destroy	Jun Takenaka	Episodes 4 and 8	
2015	Prison School	Kiyoshi Fujino	Lead role	
2015	My Little Lover	Shunichi Minami	Lead role	
2016	Sleepeeer Hit!	Sho Otsuka		
2016	Sanada Maru	Toyotomi Hideyori	Taiga drama	
2017	Woman of the Crime Lab Season 17	Eiji Eto		
2017	Detective Yugami	Masaya Uchikoshi		
2018	Fūunji tachi	Ishikawa Gentsune	TV movie	
2018	Kakegurui – Compulsive Gambler	Manyuda Kaede		
2018	Boys Over Flowers Season 2	Tenma Hase		
2018	Kakugo wa Ii ka Soko no Joshi	Towa Furuya	Lead role	
2019	Queen	Shūji Fujieda		
2019	Natsuzora: Natsu's Sky	Kazuhisa Sakaba	Asadora	
2019	Kakegurui Season 2	Manyuda Kaede		
2019	G Senjou no Anata to Watashi	Rihito Kase		
2020	Hidarite Ippon no Shuuto	Masayuki Tanaka	TV movie	
2020	Daddy is My Classmate	Masaharu Hatakeyama		
2020	Utchan	Teruyoshi Uchimura	Lead role, miniseries	
2021	Rising Wakaoka Genius Awakening	Maruyama Ōkyo	TV movie	
2021	Boku no Satsui ga Koi o Shita	Shu Onotora	Lead role	
2022	The 13 Lords of the Shogun	Hatakeyama Shigetada	Taiga drama	
2023	Burn the House Down	Shinji Mitarai		
2023	Ranman	Tōru Nagamori	Asadora	
2023	One Day: Wonderful Christmas Ado	Mizuki Fuehana		
2024	Eye Love You	Hanaoka Akito		
2024	95	Shotaro Suzuki		
2024–27	Golden Kamuy: The Hunt of Prisoners in Hokkaido / Karafuto Pursuit Arc	Otonoshin Koito	2 seasons	
2025	The Laughing Salesman	Kohei Kasaku	Episode 8	
2026	Shadows of the Ten Ninja	Kirigakure Saizō		

=== Film ===
Year	Title	Role	Notes	Ref.
2010	Hanjirou	Iwatora Miyata		
2015	Blue Demon ver.2.0	Hiroshi	Lead role	
2015	Tsuugaku Series Tsuugaku Densha	Kou		
2015	Tsuugaku Series Tsuugaku Tochu	Kou	Lead role	
2015	Chibi Maruko-chan: A Boy From Italy	Andrea (vioice)		
2016	Unrequited Love	Jun Satake	Lead role, episode 1: My Nickname is Butatchi	
2016	Your Lie in April	Ryōta Watari		
2017	Closest Love to Heaven	Yuiji Kira	Lead role	
2017	ReLIFE	Arata Kaizaki	Lead role	
2018	Kids on the Slope	Sentarō Kawabuchi	Lead role	
2018	Rainbow Days	Tomoya Matsunaga	Lead role	
2018	Lock-On Love	Towa Furuya	Lead role	
2019	Samurai Marathon	Fujii		
2020	Step		Cameo role	
2020	Josee, the Tiger and the Fish	Tsuneo Suzukawa (voice)	Lead role	
2021	My Blood & Bones in a Flowing Galaxy	Kiyosumi Hamada	Lead role	
2021	Inubu: The Dog Club	Ryōsuke Shibasaki	Lead role	
2021	Funny Bunny	Satoshi Kenmochi	Lead role	
2021	Kakegurui 2: Ultimate Russian Roulette	Uchijima		
2021	Tom and Sawyer in the City	Takuya Nikaidō		
2022	Black Night Parade	Kaiser Tanaka		
2023	Scroll	Yūsuke	Lead role	
2024	Bushido	Yakichi		
2024	A Conviction of Marriage	Kōichi Miyamae		
2024	Cha-Cha	Raku		
2025	As for Me	Nagatsuda		
2026	Golden Kamuy: The Abashiri Prison Raid	Otonoshin Koito		
2027	Darwin's Game	Kaname	Lead role	
2027	Okinawa Confidential	Hironori Akahori	Lead role	

=== Music video appearances ===
Year	Title	Artist
2013	Pinky Santa	Boyfriend
2015	Itsuka Kitto	Naoto Inti Raymi
2015	Shoudou	Haku
2016	Together	Naoto Inti Raymi
2017	Message	Sonoko Inoue
2021	Hanauranai	Vaundy

=== Japanese dub ===
Year	Title	Role	Voice dub for	Notes	Ref.
2017	Pirates of the Caribbean: Dead Men Tell No Tales	Henry Turner	Brenton Thwaites		
2020	Sonic the Hedgehog	Sonic the Hedgehog (voice)	Ben Schwartz		
2022	Sonic the Hedgehog 2	Sonic the Hedgehog (voice)	Ben Schwartz		
2024	Sonic the Hedgehog 3	Sonic the Hedgehog (voice)	Ben Schwartz		

=== Photo books ===
- Chi Yubo / Kitchen (18.03.2014) by Naoki Kimura

== Awards and nominations ==
Year	Award	Category	Nominated work(s)	Result	Ref.
2019	42nd Japan Academy Film Prize	Newcomer of the Year	Kids on the Slope and Lock-On Love	Won	
2023	47th Elan d'or Awards	Newcomer of the Year	Himself	Won	
