= Passcode (group) =

Japanese metal idol group

PassCode
- Origin: Osaka Prefecture, Japan
- Genres: Electronicore; metalcore; EDM; J-pop
- Years active: 2013-present
- Labels: we-B studios Universal Music Japan; JPU Records; MoooD Records
- Members: Nao Minami; Kaede Takashima; Hinako Ōgami; Emily Arima
- Past members: Reika Kanzaki; Saki Sakurai; Kyōko Kazuki; Yūri Kurohara; Yuna Imada
- Website: passcode-official.com

Passcode (Japanese: パスコード, Hepburn: Pasukōdo; stylized as PassCode), is a Japanese metal idol group founded in 2013.

== History ==
Passcode was formed in Osaka in 2013 and consists of the four vocalists Nao Minami, Kaede Takashima, Emily Arima and Hinako Ōgami. Passcode is supported by a backup band.

After releasing several singles and albums on smaller labels, the group signed to Universal Music Japan and released their second full-length album Zenith in 2017. In 2018 the band signed with British record label JPU Records and released a best-of record called Ex Libris Passcode in Europe.

Their song "Ichika Bachika" became the opening song for the second season of the live-action film adaption of Kakegurui. In June 2020, their ninth single "Starry Sky" debuted at number 1 on the Japanese Oricon weekly singles chart and the Billboard Japan Top Singles Sales chart, selling over 7,000 units in its first week after release.

== Musical style ==
The musical style of Passcode can be described as Electronicore. Some vocalists use harsh vocals next to cleans. Yuna Imada contributed the harsh vocals before her retirement in 2021, with the job now handled by former Ladybaby member Emily Arima. Kaede Takashima uses the harsh vocals in some tracks like "Taking You Out" and "Club Kids Never Die". The band uses Auto-Tune while singing.

The band mixes metalcore with EDM and J-pop. The songs are written in Japanese language and contain English-language parts as well.

== Members ==
- Nao Minami – vocals, and dancer (2013–present)
- Kaede Takashima – vocals, and dancer (2014–present)
- Hinako Ōgami – vocals, and dancer (2015–present)
- Emily Arima – vocals, and dancer (2021–present)

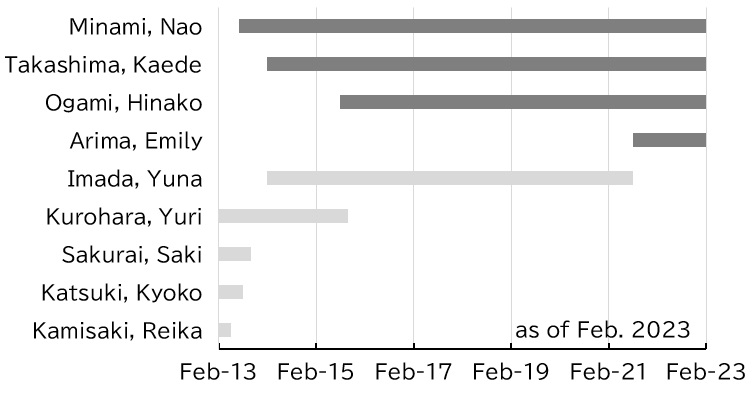
Past members

- Reika Kamisaki – vocals, and dancer (2013)
- Saki Sakurai – vocals, and dancer (2013)
- Kyōko Kazuki – vocals, and dancer (2013)
- Yūri Kurohara – vocals, and dancer (2013–2015)
- Yuna Imada – vocals, and dancer (2014–2021)

== Discography ==
Passcode discography
- Studio albums: 7
- EPs: 1
- Live albums: 1
- Compilation albums: 3
- Singles: 10
- Video albums: 13
- Music videos: 28

=== Studio albums ===
Title	Album details	Peak chart positions		
Title	Album details	JPN Oricon	JPN Billboard Hot	JPN Billboard Top
All Is Vanity	Released: October 1, 2014; Label: we-B studios; Formats: CD	—	—	—
Virtual	Released: May 25, 2016; Label: we-B studios; Formats: CD, digital download	43	60	28
Zenith	Released: August 2, 2017; Label: Universal Music Japan; Formats: CD, CD+DVD, LP, digital download	20	27	19
Clarity	Released: April 3, 2019; Label: Universal Music Japan; Formats: CD, digital download	10	7	8
Strive	Released: December 23, 2020; Label: Universal Music Japan; Formats: CD, digital download	18	13	14
Insignia	Released: June 18, 2025; Label: Moood; Formats: CD, digital download	11	—	—
Re:Code	Released: October 28, 2026; Label: Moood; Formats: CD, digital download	19	—	—
"—" denotes a release that did not chart or that the chart did not exist.

=== EPs ===
Title	EP details	Peak chart positions		
Title	EP details	JPN Oricon	JPN Billboard Hot	JPN Billboard Top
Reverberate EP.	Released: December 21, 2022; Label: Univerlsal Music Japan; Formats: CD, digital download	18	19	17
Groundswell EP.	Released: June 21, 2023; Label: Univerlsal Music Japan; Formats: CD, digital download	18	—	—

=== Compilations ===
Title	Album details	Peak chart positions		
Title	Album details	JPN Oricon	JPN Billboard Hot	JPN Billboard Top
Locus	Released: February 28, 2018; Label: Univerlsal Music Japan; Formats: CD, digital download	15	10	14
Ex Libris Passcode	Released: October 5, 2018; Label: JPU Records; Formats: CD, digital download	—	—	—
Passcode the Best -Link-	Released: September 29, 2021; Label: Universal Music Japan; Formats: 2xCD, 2xCD+DVD, 2xCD+Blu-ray, digital download	18	18	15
"—" denotes a release that did not chart.

=== Live albums ===
Title	Album details	Peak chart positions	
Title	Album details	JPN Oricon	JPN Billboard Top
Passcode 2016-2018 Live Unlimited	Released: December 19, 2018; Label: Univerlsal Music Japan; Formats: CD, digital download	93	79

=== Singles ===
Title	Year	Peak chart positions			Album
Title	Year	JPN Oricon	JPN Hot 100	JPN Hot Singles	Album
"Nextage"	2014	165	—	—	Virtual
"Now I Know"	2015	111	—	—	Virtual
"Never Sleep Again"	2015	159	—	—	Virtual
"Miss Unlimited"	2016	43	—	29	Zenith
"Bite the Bullet"	2017	16	86	16	Zenith
"Ray"	2018	16	64	15	Clarity
"Tonight / Taking You Out"	2018	12	65 (Note: Only "Tonight" charted.)	13	Clarity
"Atlas"	2019	18	—	20	Strive
"Starry Sky"	2020	1	—	1	Strive
"Freely / Flavor of Blue"	2021	12	—	15	Non-album singles
"Liberator"	2026	10	—	—	Non-album singles
"—" denotes a release that did not chart.

=== DVD / Blu-ray ===
Title	Video details	Peak chart positions	
Title	Video details	JPN DVDs	JPN Blu-rays
All Is Vanity	Released: March 18, 2015; Label: We-B Studios	198	—
"Trial of Passcode" Tour Final Tokyo at Akasaka Blitz	Released: July 22, 2016; Label: We-B Studios	—	—
Passcode 2016-2018 Live Unlimited Premium Box	Released: December 19, 2018; Label: Universal Music Japan	—	58
Passcode Miss Unlimited Tour 2016 at Studio Coast	Released: December 19, 2018; Label: Universal Music Japan	—	—
Passcode Zenith Tour 2017 Final Series at Tsutaya O-East	Released: December 19, 2018; Label: Universal Music Japan	—	—
Passcode Presents Versus Passcode 2018 at Bigcat	Released: December 19, 2018; Label: Universal Music Japan	—	—
Passcode Taking You Out Tonight! Tour 2018 Final at Zepp DiverCity Tokyo	Released: March 13, 2019; Label: Universal Music Japan	19	16
PassCode Zepp Tour 2019 at Zepp Osaka Bayside	Released: August 12, 2019; Label: Universal Music Japan	24	23
Passcode Clarity Plus Tour 19-20 Final at Studio Coast	Released: March 15, 2020; Label: Universal Music Japan	36	30
Passcode Starry Tour 2020 Final at KT Zepp Yokohama	Released: November 18, 2020; Label: Universal Music Japan	23	12
Passcode "Strive for Budokon Tour 2021 at Toyosu Pit	Released: June 9, 2021; Label: Universal Music Japan	10	7
Passcode Zepp Tour 2021 at Haneda	Released: December 22, 2021; Label: Universal Music Japan	57	48
Passcode Nippon Budokan 2022	Released: June 29, 2022; Label: Universal Music Japan	17	18
"—" denotes a release that did not chart.

== Music videos ==
Song	Year	Link
"Asterisk" (アスタリスク)	2014	
"XYZ"	2014	
"Over There"	2014	
"Seize the Day"	2014	
"Kiss no Hanataba" (Kissの花束)	2014	
"Gekidō Progressive" (激動プログレッシブ)	2014	
"Nextage"	2014	
"Now I Know"	2015	
"Orange" (オレンジ)	2015	
"Never Sleep Again"	2015	
"From Here"	2016	
"Axis"	2016	
"Ninja Bomber"	2016	
"Miss Unlimited"	2016	
"Bite the Bullet"	2017	
"One Step Beyond"	2017	
"Same to You"	2017	
"Ray"	2018	
"Taking You Out"	2018	
"Projection"	2019	
"Atlas"	2019	
"Starry Sky"	2020	
"Mantra"	2020	
"Anything New"	2020	
"Spark Ignition"	2020	
"Freely"	2021	
"Flavor of Blue"	2022	
"Siren"	2022	
"Clouds Across the Moon"	2023	
