= Mahiro Takasugi =

Japanese actor (born 1996)

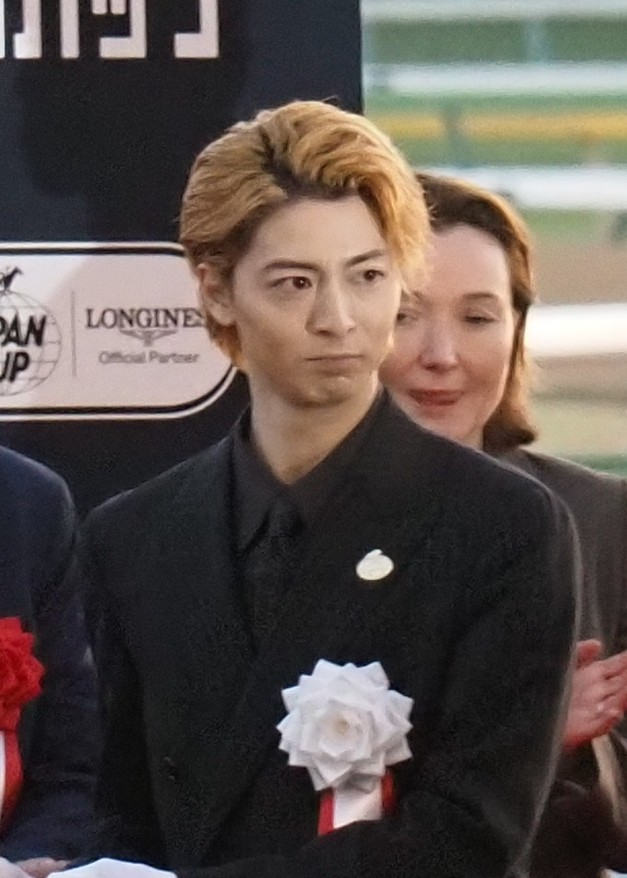
- Takasugi in 2024
- Born: July 4, 1996 (age 30); Fukuoka Prefecture, Japan
- Occupation: Actor
- Years active: 2009–present
- Agent: Posters
- Spouse: Haru (m. 2025)

Japanese name
- Kanji: 高杉 真宙
- Hiragana: たかすぎ まひろ
Transcriptions
- Romanization: Takasugi Mahiro
- Website: takasugi-mahiro.jp

Mahiro Takasugi (高杉 真宙, Takasugi Mahiro; born July 4, 1996) is a Japanese actor who is affiliated with Posters.

== Biography ==
Mahiro Takasugi was born on July 4, 1996, in Fukuoka Prefecture, Japan. He is the eldest among three brothers. In December 2025, his mother died due to an undisclosed illness shortly after his marriage.

Before becoming an actor, he aspired to become a kindergarten teacher, as he adores children. Takasugi has a shy and introverted personality. He is an avid fan of manga and anime.

== Career ==
Takasugi was scouted by chance at a fireworks display held in Kumamoto Prefecture. In 2009, he debuted in the stage play, Every Little Thing '09 and in 2010 he made his film debut in Hanjiro.

Started acting as an actor in 2009.

In 2012, he starred in the movie "Quartet" for the first time.

In 2013, he got highlights in the role of Mistsuzane Kureshima in Kamen Rider Gaim.

In 2015, he won the Best Newcomer Award at the 36th Yokohama Film Festival for the movie "Bon Lin".

In 2017, he won the 72nd Mainichi Film Awards Sponichi Grand Prix New Face Award for the movie "Before We Vanish".

== Personal life ==
On December 23, 2025, Takasugi announced through his official social media account that he had married actress Haru in early December. Their wedding ceremony was attended by family and friends.

== Filmography ==
=== TV series ===
Year	Title	Role	Ref.
2012	Taira no Kiyomori	Kousagimaru	
2013	No Dropping Out: Back to School at 35	Ren Azuma	
2013–14	Kamen Rider Gaim	Mitsuzane Kureshima/Kamen Rider Ryugen/ Kamen Rider Zangetsu Shin/Kamen Rider Ryugen Yomi	
2015	Tomorrow There Will Also Surely Be Delicious Meals	Ritsu Hayakawa	
2015	High School Chorus	Yu Miyazaki	
2016	Sumika Sumire	Keiwa Amano	
2016	Whose Is the Cuckoo's Egg?	Shingo Torigoe	
2017	Seto and Utsumi	So Utsumi	
2018	Kakegurui – Compulsive Gambler	Ryota Suzui	
2018	The Count of Monte-Cristo: Great Revenge	Shinichiro Mario	
2019	Kakegurui Season 2	Ryota Suzui	
2019	Takane & Hana	Takane Saibara	
2019	Sign	Kirito Takahashi	
2020	Absolute Zero 4	Hiroki Shinoda	
2020	Cursed in Love	Yusuke Jojima	
2021	Odd Taxi	Satoshi Nagashima (voice)	
2021	Re-Main	Akihisa Fukui (voice)	
2021	Only Just Married	Yuito Makihara	
2021	My Imaginary Meal to be Praised	Masao Wada	
2022	Soar High!	Hirofumi Kariya	
2022	Animation x Paralympic: Harigane Service	Shun Hada (voice)	
2022	PICU	Yuta Yano	
2022–25	Gannibal	Kyōsuke Terayama	
2024	Dear Radiance	Fujiwara no Nobunori	
2025	Passing the Reins	Ryujiro Saki	
2026	Blood and Sweat	Ryuji Suzumiya	

=== Films ===
Year	Title	Role	Ref.
2013	Kamen Rider × Kamen Rider Gaim & Wizard: The Fateful Sengoku Movie Battle	Mitsuzane Kureshima/Kamen Rider Ryugen	
2014	Bon Lin	Lin / Rintaro Tomoda	
2014	Heisei Rider vs. Shōwa Rider: Kamen Rider Taisen feat. Super Sentai	Mitsuzane Kureshima/Kamen Rider Ryugen	
2014	Kamen Rider Gaim: Great Soccer Battle! Golden Fruits Cup!	Mitsuzane Kureshima/Kamen Rider Ryugen	
2014	Kamen Rider × Kamen Rider Drive & Gaim: Movie War Full Throttle	Mitsuzane Kureshima/Kamen Rider Ryugen	
2014	The World of Kanako	Yasuhiro Matsunaga	
2017	Policeman and Me	Heisuke Ōkami	
2017	Lights of Kyoto	Takatoyo Akada	
2017	ReLIFE	Kazuomi Ōga	
2017	Before We Vanish	Amano	
2017	Tori Girl	Kei Takahashi	
2018	Principal	Wao Sakurai	
2018	The World's Longest Photograph	Hironobu	
2018	Gangoose	Saike	
2018	You Are You By You	Sōta	
2018	I Want to Eat Your Pancreas	Haruki Shiga (voice)	
2018	Rainbow Days	Tsuyoshi Naoe	
2019	Kakegurui – Compulsive Gambler	Ryota Suzui	
2019	Smiles Leading to Happiness.	Daichi	
2019	Boy Detectives Club Neo	Yoshirō Kobayashi	
2019	Blind	Haruma	
2019	12 Suicidal Teens	Satoshi	
2020	Project Dream: How to Build Mazinger Z's Hangar	Doi	
2020	Threads: Our Tapestry of Love	Ryōta	
2021	Kakegurui 2: Ultimate Russian Roulette	Ryota Suzui	
2021	The Supporting Actors: The Movie	Himself	
2022	Offbeat Cops	Yūji Kitamura	
2022	How to Find Happiness	Toshihide Ichikawa	
2023	Tokyo Revengers 2: Bloody Halloween Part 1	Chifuyu Matsuno	
2023	Tokyo Revengers 2: Bloody Halloween Part 2	Chifuyu Matsuno	
2023	See Hear Love	Daisuke Uemura	
2024	Oasis	Kanamori	
2025	Tokyo MER: Mobile Emergency Room – Nankai Mission	Taku Tokiwa	
2025	The Final Piece	Naoya Sano	
2025	Romantic Killer		
2026	The Imaginary Dog and the Lying Cat	Yamabuki Haneko	
2026	All Our Tomorrows	Shoichi Endo	
2026	Tokyo MER: Mobile Emergency Room – Capital Crisis	Taku Tokiwa	
2027	Kaiji 4	Keita Mashita	
2027	The Tiger and Her Wings: The Movie	Yukichi Hasebe	

=== Video games ===
Year	Title	Role	Ref.
2026	Professor Layton and the New World of Steam	Eggmuffin Sonder (voice)	

== Awards and nominations ==
Year	Award	Category	Nominated work	Result	Ref.
2015	36th Yokohama Film Festival	Best Newcomer Awards	Bon Lin	Won	
2017	72nd Mainichi Film Awards	Best New Actor	Before We Vanish	Won	
