= Minami Hamabe =

Japanese actress (born 2000)

- 浜辺 美波
- Hamabe at the 2026 New York Film Festival
- Born: August 29, 2000 (age 26); Ishikawa Prefecture, Japan
- Education: Horikoshi High School
- Occupation: Actress
- Years active: 2011–present
- Agent: Toho Entertainment
- Website: minami-hamabe.net

Minami Hamabe (浜辺 美波, Hamabe Minami; born August 29, 2000) is a Japanese actress. Having starred in various blockbusters and popular television shows since her teenage years, she is one of Japan's most prominent figures in the modern-day entertainment industry.

Hamabe won the New Generation Award at the 2011 Toho Cinderella Audition and subsequently began her film career the following year. She gained fame by playing Meiko Honma in the live-action version of the TV series Anohana (2015), and later made her breakthrough playing the lead in the romance film Let Me Eat Your Pancreas (2017); with the latter earning her Newcomer of the Year at the 41st Japan Academy Prize. Hamabe subsequently starred in The Great War of Archimedes (2019), Cursed in Love, The Promised Neverland (both 2020), Kakegurui – Compulsive Gambler Part 2 (2021), and One Day, You Will Reach the Sea (2022).

In 2023, she co-starred with Ryunosuke Kamiki in the television drama Ranman and as Noriko Ōishi in Takashi Yamazaki's kaiju epic Godzilla Minus One. Her acting in Godzilla Minus One along with Shin Kamen Rider attained her international recognition, and she won Best Supporting Actress at the 66th Blue Ribbon Awards. She later reprised her role as Noriko in Godzilla Minus Zero (2026).

== Early life and career ==
Hamabe was born in Ishikawa Prefecture on August 29, 2000. She has one younger brother seven years her junior. On February 20, 2019, Hamabe shared the news of her graduation from Horikoshi High School.

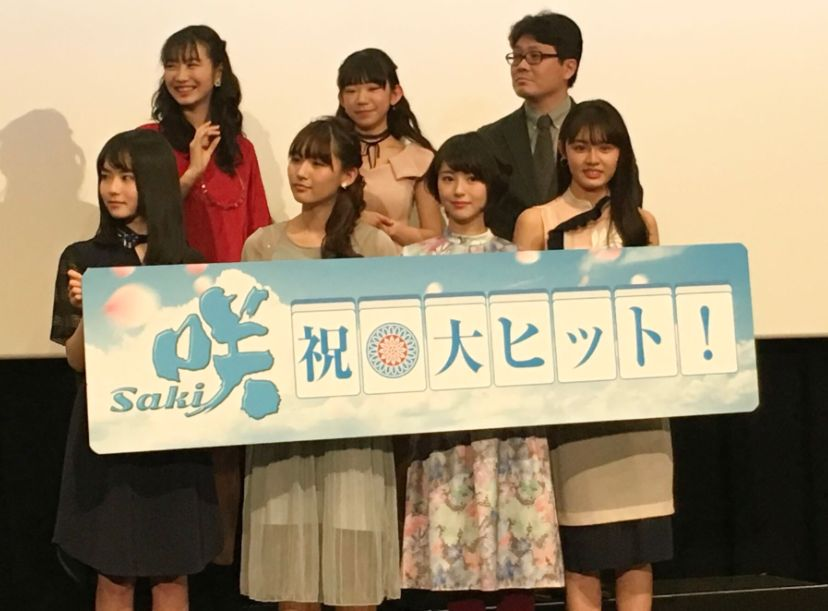
Young Hamabe (front row, second from right)

She started off her career by winning the New Generation Award at the 7th Toho Cinderella Audition. She has since starred in numerous films and dramas, with many of them being live-action adaptations of popular manga and video games.

Hamabe gained widespread fame for her role in Japan for her role in the live-action film Let Me Eat Your Pancreas, which tells the story of a terminally ill girl's relationship with her introvert male classmate who happens to find out about her illness by accident. The film was the 5th highest-grossing film in Japan in 2017. Hamabe was awarded the Newcomer Of The Year Award at the 41st Japan Academy Film Prize, with the film itself being nominated for the Picture of the Year award at the same ceremony.

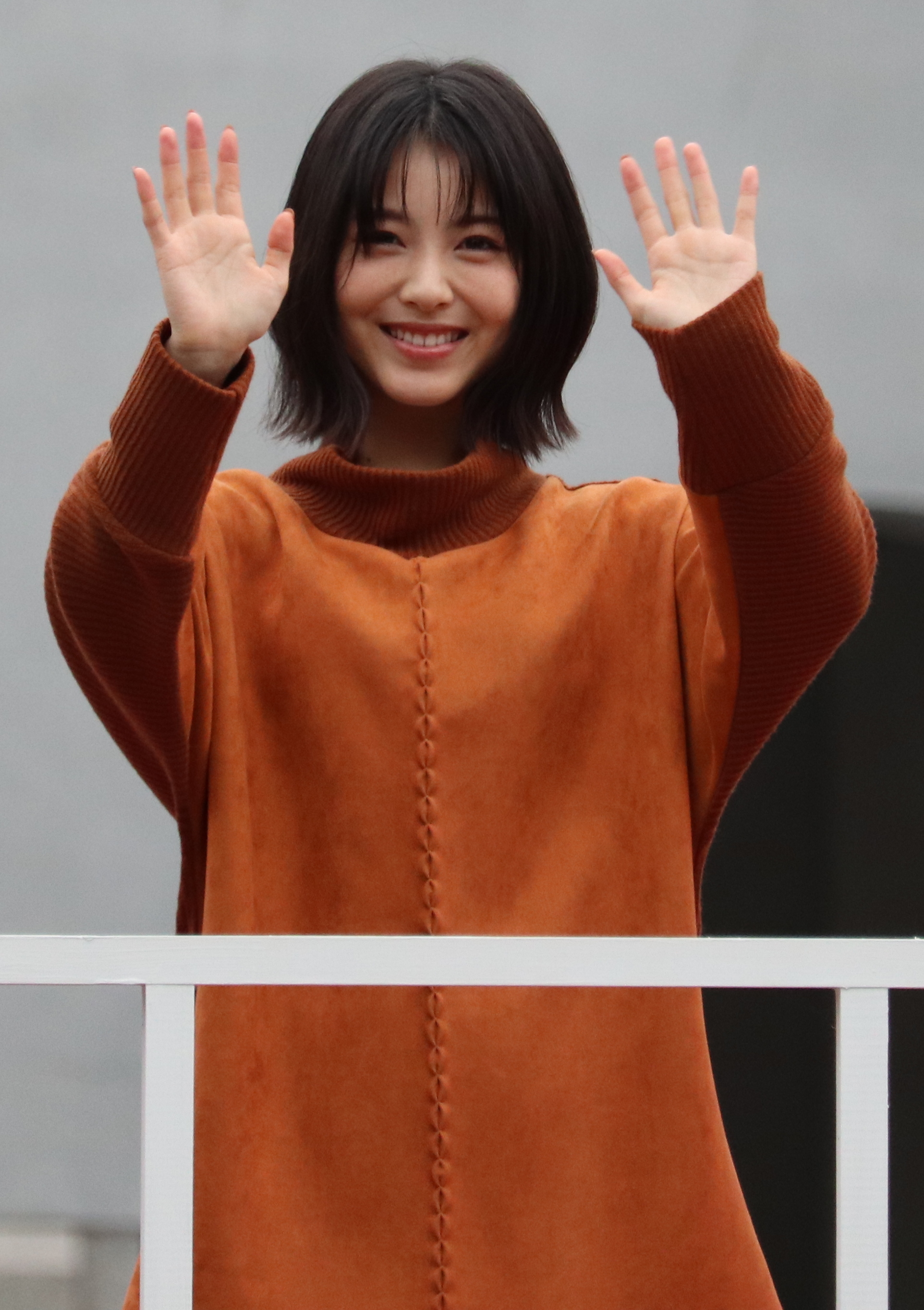
Hamabe in October 2019

In 2019, Hamabe starred in the film The Great War of Archimedes. It grossed over 1.9 billion yen in Japan is amongst the highest-grossing film of 2019 in Japan.

In 2020, Hamabe co-starred with Ryusei Yokohama and Yukino Kishii in the live-action adaptation of the manga Cursed in Love. Hamabe also appeared in the film Murders At The House of Death in 2020. The film has grossed over 1 billion yen and is the 20th highest-grossing film in Japan for the year 2020.

In December 2020, Hamabe starred in the live-action film The Promised Neverland. The film has since grossed over 2.1 billion yen in Japan, making it amongst the highest-grossing film of 2021 in Japan. Hamabe starred in the drama Dr. White in 2022. The drama is based on the novels Dr. White: Senrigan no Karute (published 2015 by Kadokawa) and Dr. White: Kami no Shindan (published 2019 by Kadokawa) by Shin Kibayashi. Hamabe also appeared alongside Sho Hirano in the SP drama Seito ga Jinsei wo Yarinaoseru Gakko. Hamabe again starred alongside Yukino Kishii in the film One Day, You Will Reach the Sea (Yagate Umi e to Todoku) which was released in April 2022.

Hamabe was chosen directly by NHK without audition as the 108th Asadora heroine by NHK whereby she starred alongside Ryunosuke Kamiki as the wife of Kamiki's character. Filming for the Asadora, titled Ranman (らんまん), began in fall 2023. She appeared in two major films in 2023: Hideaki Anno's live-action superhero film Shin Kamen Rider and played a similar character to that of Ranman in Takashi Yamazaki's Godzilla Minus One.

== Personal life ==
Hamabe is the eldest child in her family, and has a brother seven years younger to whom she is very close. In an interview, Hamabe stated that she became a fan of Kamen Rider after frequently watching the television series with her younger brother.

Hamabe has a Pomeranian pet dog she calls "Popu-chan". She is close friends with fellow actors Takumi Kitamura, Kanna Hashimoto, and Elaiza Ikeda.

Before winning the Toho Cinderella Audition and entering the entertainment industry, she initially wanted to become a dentist.

== Filmography ==
=== Films ===
Year	Title	Role	Notes	Ref(s)
2012	Ace Attorney	Young Chihiro Ayasato (Mia Fey)		
2015	April Fools	Rika Etō		
2016	Yo-kai Watch the Movie: A Whale of Two Worlds	Kanami Minami		
2017	Saki	Saki Miyanaga	Lead role	
2017	Let Me Eat Your Pancreas	Sakura Yamauchi	Lead role	
2017	Ajin: Demi-Human	Eriko Nagai		
2018	My Little Monster	Chizuru Oshima		
2018	My Teacher, My Love	Ayuha Samaru	Lead role	
2019	The Great War of Archimedes	Kyōko Ozaki		
2019	Kakegurui – Compulsive Gambler	Yumeko Jabami	Lead role	
2019	Murders at the House of Death	Hiruko Kenzaki		
2019	Hello World	Ruri Ichigyō (voice)		
2020	Love Me, Love Me Not	Akari Yamamoto	Lead role	
2020	Love Me, Love Me Not: The Animation	Chiyo (voice)	Cameo	
2020	The Promised Neverland	Emma	Lead role	
2020	Keep Your Hands Off Eizouken!	Haruko		
2021	Detective Conan: The Scarlet Bullet	Ellie Ishioka (voice)		
2021	Kakegurui 2: Ultimate Russian Roulette	Yumeko Jabami	Lead role	
2022	One Day, You Will Reach the Sea	Sumire		
2023	Gold Kingdom and Water Kingdom	Sarah (voice)	Lead role	
2023	Shin Kamen Rider	Ruriko Midorikawa		
2023	Godzilla Minus One	Noriko Oishi		
2024	Silent Love	Mika		
2024	What If Shogun Ieyasu Tokugawa Was to Become the Prime Minister	Risa Nishimura	Lead role	
2024	6 Lying University Students	Iori Shima	Lead role	
2025	Under Ninja	Ayaka Noguchi		
2025	My Special One	Herself	Cameo	
2026	Until We Meet Again	Misora Shimizu	Lead role	
2026	Godzilla Minus Zero	Noriko Shikishima		

=== Television ===
Year	Title	Role	Notes	Ref(s)
2015	Mare	Asami Okesaku	Asadora	
2015	Anohana: The Flower We Saw That Day	Meiko "Menma" Honma	Lead role, TV movie	
2016	Saki	Saki Miyanaga	Lead role	
2018	Kakegurui	Yumeko Jabami	Lead role	
2018	Hotel on the Brink	Haru Horai		
2019	Ōoku the Final	Takehime	TV movie	
2019	Pure! Idol Becomes One Day Chief of Police	Junko Kurobara	Lead role	
2020	Alibi Breaker	Tokino Mitani	Lead role	
2020	Cursed in Love	Nao Hanaoka	Lead role	
2020	Talio: Avenger Buddies	Mami	Lead role	
2021	Date My Daughter!	Sora Minase		
2021	A School Where Students Can Start Over	Okabe Kaoruko	Lead role, TV movie	
2022	Dr. White	Byakuya Yukimura	Lead role	
2023	Crayon Shin-chan	Ruriko Midorikawa (voice)	Episode 1173	
2023	Ranman	Sueko Makino	Asadora	
2025	Pray Speak What Has Happened	Juri Egashira		
2026	Brothers in Arms	Nene	Taiga drama	

=== Other television ===
Year	Title	Notes	Ref(s)
2023	74th NHK Kōhaku Uta Gassen	Host	

=== Video games ===
Year	Title	Role	Notes	Ref(s)
TBA	Physint	TBA		

=== Music video appearances ===
Year	Title	Artist	Notes	Ref.
2016	"Sora ga Aozora de Aru Tame ni"	Glay		
2017	"Hana no Uta"	Aimer		
2018	"I Want You Back"	Twice		
2019	"I Beg You"	Aimer		
2020	"Haru wa Yuku"	Aimer		

== Awards and nominations ==
Year	Award	Category	Work	Result	Ref(s)
2017	30th Nikkan Sports Film Awards	Best Newcomer	Let Me Eat Your Pancreas and Ajin: Demi-Human	Won	
2017	30th Nikkan Sports Film Awards	Best Actress	Let Me Eat Your Pancreas	Nominated	
2017	42nd Hochi Film Awards	Best New Artist	Let Me Eat Your Pancreas	Won	
2018	72nd Mainichi Film Awards	Best New Actress	Let Me Eat Your Pancreas	Nominated	
2018	60th Blue Ribbon Awards	Best Newcomer	Let Me Eat Your Pancreas	Nominated	
2018	27th Tokyo Sports Film Awards	Best Newcomer	Let Me Eat Your Pancreas	Nominated	
2018	41st Japan Academy Prize	Newcomer of the Year	Let Me Eat Your Pancreas	Won	
2021	45th Elan d'or Awards	Newcomer of the Year	Herself	Won	
2023	36th Nikkan Sports Film Awards	Best Supporting Actress	Godzilla Minus One and Shin Kamen Rider	Nominated	
2023	48th Hochi Film Awards	Best Supporting Actress	Godzilla Minus One and Shin Kamen Rider	Nominated	
2024	66th Blue Ribbon Awards	Best Supporting Actress	Godzilla Minus One and Shin Kamen Rider	Won	
2024	47th Japan Academy Film Prize	Best Actress	Godzilla Minus One	Nominated	
2024	47th Japan Academy Film Prize	Best Supporting Actress	Shin Kamen Rider	Nominated	
2024	17th Asian Film Awards	Best Supporting Actress	Godzilla Minus One	Nominated	
