= Natsume Mito =

Japanese model, presenter, and singer (born 1990)

- 三戸なつめ
- Born: Natsume Mito; February 20, 1990 (age 36); Nara, Nara, Japan
- Occupations: Model; presenter; singer; actress
- Years active: 2013–present
- Agent: Asobisystem
- Musical career
- Genres: J-pop; pop-rock; alternative dance; folktronica
- Instruments: Vocals, guitar
- Years active: 2015–2018
- Labels: Sony Music Japan (2015–2018)
- Website: mito.asobisystem.com

Natsume Mito (三戸なつめ; born February 20, 1990) is a Japanese actress, model, presenter, and singer. She debuted as a singer on April 8, 2015, with the song "Maegami Kirisugita," which was produced by Japanese musician Yasutaka Nakata.

== Background ==
Mito started working as a model in 2010 and was able to make her 2013 modeling debut in Japanese magazines like Mer, Zip, and Non-no. She later released self-produced photoshoot book "Natsume-san" in 2013, selling 50,000 copies. In January 2015, her management Asobisystem got her a recording contract under Sony Music Associated Records, a sublabel of Sony Music Japan. It was later announced that her music will be produced by Japanese electronica duo Capsule member Yasutaka Nakata. In February 2015, it was announced that Mito will be releasing her debut single, "Maegami Kirisugita", on April 8, 2015. In conjunction with the release, she had contributed the theme song to the Japanese romantic movie "Koisuru Vampire" titled "Colony". The song was included as a B-side to the said single.

In September 2015, Mito released her second single, "8-bit Boy", which was used as the main theme to the Japanese premiere of the American movie Pixels. Its B-side track, "Watashi wo Fes ni Tsuretette", was released as a separate digital single and has received a music video. On April 6, 2016, Mito's third single, "I'll do my best", was released. In May 2016, a song titled "Odekake Summer" was released in a form of music video to promote a Japanese mosquito repellent brand.

In December 2016, it was announced that Mito will be contributing a song for an anime for the first time. The song was revealed to be "Puzzle", which became the ending theme to the animation series Puzzle & Dragons X. The song was officially released as a double A-side single, "Puzzle/Hanabira", on February 22, 2017. The latter was used as a tie-up commercial song to Oyatsu Company's Ramen Noodle Snack product. Few days after the release of the single, Mito's agency, Asobisystem and record label Sony Music Japan, has announced that she will finally be releasing her debut studio album on April 26. The cover and tracklist were revealed later that month. The album debuted at the 64th spot of the Oricon Weekly Albums, selling 1,261 copies on its first week of release.

== Discography ==
=== Albums ===
- Natsumelo (2017)

=== Singles ===
| Single | Release date | Title | Peak Position (Oricon) | Peak Position (Japan Hot 100) | First Week Sales |
|---|---|---|---|---|---|
| 1 | April 8, 2015 | Maegami Kirisugita | 36 | – | 1,320 |
| DG | August 5, 2015 | Watashi wo Fes ni Tsuretette | – | – | |
| 2 | September 16, 2015 | 8-bit Boy | 45 | 45 | 1,325 |
| 3 | April 6, 2016 | I'll do my best | 41 | – | 1,264 |
| 4 | February 22, 2017 | Puzzle/Hanabira | 108 | – | 639 |

=== DVDs ===
| Single | Release date | Title | Peak Position (Oricon) | Peak Position (Japan Hot 100) | First Week Sales |
|---|---|---|---|---|---|
| 1 | June 24, 2015 | "Maegami Kiri Sugita" no MV Tsukuri Sugita | 179 | – | |

== Filmography ==
=== Movies ===
- 2015: Koisuru Vampire, Natsu
- 2019: Kakegurui – Compulsive Gambler, Runa Yomozuki
- 2021: Kakegurui – Compulsive Gambler Part 2, Runa Yomozuki
- 2021: Shinonome-iro no Shūmatsu as Masami Andō
- 2022: Love Life
- 2023: Hold Your Hand
- 2024: Paradise of Solitude
- 2025: Kaiju Guy!
- 2025: The Rightman
- 2026: Hoshi no Kyoshitsu

=== Dramas ===
- 2016: Times "Arau" and "Shimizu", Mino
- 2016: Seisei Suru Hodo, Aishiteru, cake store's clerk
- 2018–2019: Kakegurui, Yomozuki Runa
- 2019: Setsuyaku Locke, Natsume Mito

=== Dubbing ===
- Paddington as Judy Brown
- Paddington 2, Judy Brown
- Paddington in Peru, Judy Brown

=== TV shows ===
- 2015–2018: MBS Song Town
- 2016–2018: Mito Natsume's Songstreet
- 2016–2019: Chi-chin Puipui Getsuyoubi
- 2017: Kyōnoryōri Beginners Batsue no Sparta Natsu Men Juku
- 2017: Himitsu no Kenmin Show
- 2018–present: + music
- 2019–present: Mint!
- 2019–present: Go go Nama Oishī Kin'yōbi

=== Theatre ===
- 2018: E.g. Woman as member of Team Mehyō
- 2018: TOP's & BOTTOM's ~ Futatsu no Kokoro to Hitotsu no Mirai ~ as performer
- 2018: Tekkonkinkreet as Shiro

== Concert tours ==
- Natsumelo Live Tour "Mito Natsume wa Chou-Omedetai" (2017)

== Bibliography ==
=== Nonfiction book ===
- Natsume Mito (July 26, 2013), Natsume-san (in Japanese), Tokyo: Gakken Publishing, ISBN 978-4-054-05766-1

=== Photo-book ===
- Natsume Mito (January 28, 2016), Natsume Fuku (in Japanese), Tokyo: Gakken Plus, ISBN 978-4-054-06290-0

=== Picture book ===
- Natsume Mito (December 13, 2017), Mumu (in Japanese), Tokyo: independent
- Natsume Mito (July 21, 2018), Mumu〜 Shima-chan no Tanjoubi 〜 (in Japanese), Tokyo: independent
