= Natsumi Okamoto =

Japanese actress and model (born 1998)

- 岡本 夏美
- Born: 1 July 1998 (age 27); Kanagawa Prefecture, Japan
- Occupations: Model; actress
- Years active: 2011–present
- Agent: Ever Green Entertainment
- Style: Fashion
- Height: 1.62 m (5 ft 4 in)

Natsumi Okamoto (岡本 夏美, Okamoto Natsumi; born 1 July 1998, in Kanagawa Prefecture) is a Japanese actress and fashion model. She is represented with Ever Green Entertainment.

Okamoto won the Grand Prix in the audition for the magazine Love Berry in 2011, became an exclusive model later on until 2012, and later became an exclusive model for the magazine Nicola. She is now an exclusive model for Seventeen.

One of Okamoto's prominent activities is when she appeared as an Oha Girl in the television program Oha Suta from 2012 to 2013. In contrast to her modelling activities, she appear in television dramas such as Yakō Kanran-sha, GTO and Hell Teacher Nūbē since 2013, and gained particular attention when she appeared in GTO in 2014, in which it dramatically increased her recognition as an actress.

== Filmography ==
=== TV drama ===
Year	Title	Role	Network	Note	Ref(s)
2013	Yakō Kanran-sha	Minami Saeki	TBS		
2014	GTO	Sana Hiiragi	KTV		
2014	Hell Teacher Nūbē	Shiori Matsumoto	NTV		
2015	Tokumei Obasan Kenji! Ayano Hanamura no Jiken File		TV Tokyo		
2016	Rinshō Hanzai Gakusha: Hideo Himura no Suiri		NTV		
2016	Saki	Yumi Kajiki	MBS		
2017	Ito-kun A to E		TBS	Episode 3-4	
2018	Kakegurui – Compulsive Gambler	Yuriko Nishinotoin	MBS		
2018	Sakura no Oyakodon Season 2	Yuka Shinjo	Fuji TV		
2019	Back Street Girls: Gokudoruzu	Airi Yamamoto	MBS		
2019	Kakegurui Season 2	Yurino Nishinotoin	MBS, TBS		
2019	Onzoshi Boys	Yu Shibayama	Abema TV		
2020	Nibiiro no Hako no Naka de	Aoi Takatori	TV Asahi		
2020	Soshite, Yuriko wa Hitori ni Natti	Yuriko Yasaka	Kansai TV		
2020	Toshishita Karenshi	Morino	TV Asahi	Episode 7	
2020	Ginza Kuroneko Monogatari		Kansai TV		
2022	Short Program	Chisato Ichinose	Amazon Prime Video	Episode: "Plus 1"	
2023	Mentsuyu Hitori Meshi	Mai Shirota	BS Shochiku Tokyu	Season 1	
2024	Omusubi	Suzune "Suzurin" Tanaka	NHK	Asadora	

=== TV programs ===
Year	Title	Network	Notes
2012	Oha Suta	TV Tokyo	As member of Oha Girl Chu! Chu! Chu!
2015	Wide na Show	Fuji TV	As Wide na High School Student
2015	Shikujiri Sensei: Ore mitai ni naru na!!	Fuji TV	Appeared in short drama
2016	Tsūkai TV: Sukatto Japan	TV Asahi	As student

=== Films ===
Year	Title	Role	Notes	Ref(s)
2013	Cult	Miho Kaneda		
2016	Kamen Rider 1	Mayu Tachibana		
2016	Jinrō Game: Prison Break	Nagisa Kinjo		
2017	Saki	Yumi Kajiki		
2017	Aki	Aki	Lead role	
2017	Hello, Goodbye	Hitomi		
2019	Back Street Girls: Gokudols	Kentaro/Airi Yamamoto		
2019	Kakegurui – Compulsive Gambler	Yuriko Nishinotoin		
2021	Kakegurui – Compulsive Gambler Part 2	Yuriko Nishinotoin		
2021	Honey Lemon Soda	Ayumi Endō		
2023	Adulthood Friends	Megumi Tachibana		

=== Stage ===
Year	Title	Role
2012	Itsunomanika, Kimi wa	
2012	Natsu Genei	
2013	Aoi Kisetsu	Rumi
2013	Ever Green Entertainment Show 2013	
2013	Abadon no Sōkutsu	
2014	Evergreen High School Theater Department	
2014	Atami Satsujin Jiken	Hanako
2014	Legend: Kaze no naka no Chiri	
2016	Tanpen Geki-shū II: 4tsu no Monogatari	Secretary, Yuria

=== Advertising ===
Year	Title	Notes
2013	Ace Adidas Bag Collection	Image model
2014	Vantan L'Ecole Vantan High School	Image model
2014	Narumiya International Lovetoxic	Image model

=== Advertisements ===
Year	Title	Notes	Ref(s)
2012	Rohto Pharmaceutical Mentholatum Acnes		
2016	Tokyo Gas "Anzen Today-Hikkoshi"		
2016	Kayac Boku-ra no Kōshien! Pocket "Senshu Sensei"		
2016	Japan Post Yu-Pack	Internet advert	

== Bibliography ==
=== Magazines ===
Year	Title	Notes
2011	Love Berry	Exclusive model
2012	Nicola	Exclusive model
2015	Seventeen	Exclusive model

=== Mook ===
Year	Title
2012	Repipi Armario Brand oshare Book
