= Miki Yanagi =

Japanese actress

- 柳 美稀
- Born: August 24, 1997 (age 28); Osaka Prefecture, Japan
- Occupations: Actress, model
- Years active: 2016–present
- Height: 167 cm (5 ft 6 in)

Miki Yanagi (柳 美稀, Yanagi Miki; born August 24, 1997) is a Japanese actress and fashion model managed by Oscar Promotion. She is well known for her role as Sela/Zyuoh Shark in the 40th entry of the Super Sentai series, Doubutsu Sentai Zyuohger

== Biography and career ==
Miki Yanagi was born in Osaka Prefecture on August 27, 1997.

In 2016, Yanagi debuted as an actress, with her first leading role in the 2016 Super Sentai series Doubutsu Sentai Zyuohger as Sela.

== Filmography ==
=== TV series ===
Year	Title	Role	Network	Notes
2016	Doubutsu Sentai Zyuohger	Sela / Zyuoh Shark	TV Asahi	Debut role
2017	Sakura's OyakoDon	Rie Masaki	Fuji TV, Tokai TV	
2018	Futari Monologue	Mikage Mikuriya	Abema TV	Main role
2018	Kakegurui – Compulsive Gambler	Midari Ikishima	MBS	
2018	Investor Z	Takako Watanabe	TV Tokyo	
2019	Kakegurui Season 2	Midari Ikishima	MBS	
2019	Sign	Sayaka Miyajima	TV Asahi	
2020	Rent-a-Person Who Does Nothing	Hiromi	TV Tokyo	Episode 3
2020	24 Japan	Suzu Hakozaki	TV Asahi	

=== Film ===
Year	Title	Role	Notes
2016	Shuriken Sentai Ninninger vs. ToQger the Movie: Ninja in Wonderland	Zyuoh Shark	Voice role
2016	Doubutsu Sentai Zyuohger the Movie: The Exciting Circus Panic!	Sela/Zyuoh Shark	
2017	Doubutsu Sentai Zyuohger vs. Ninninger the Movie: Super Sentai's Message from the Future	Sela/Zyuoh Shark	
2017	Kamen Rider × Super Sentai: Ultra Super Hero Taisen	Zyuoh Shark	Voice role
2017	Doubutsu Sentai Zyuohger Returns: Give Me Your Life! Earth Champion Tournament	Sela/Zyuoh Shark	
2018	Karts in Suzuka	Askia Nanagi	
2019	Kakegurui – Compulsive Gambler	Midari Ikishima	
2021	Kakegurui – Compulsive Gambler Part 2	Midari Ikishima	

=== Video game ===
Year	Title	Role	Notes
2016	Doubutsu Sentai Zyuohger: Battle Cube Puzzle	Sela/Zyuoh Shark	Nintendo 3DS

=== Others ===
Year	Title	Role	Notes
2017	Zyuden Sentai Kyoryuger Brave	Zyuoh Shark	Voice role (Cameo, Episode 12)
