= Yurika Nakamura (actress) =

Japanese actress (born 1997)

- 中村 ゆりか
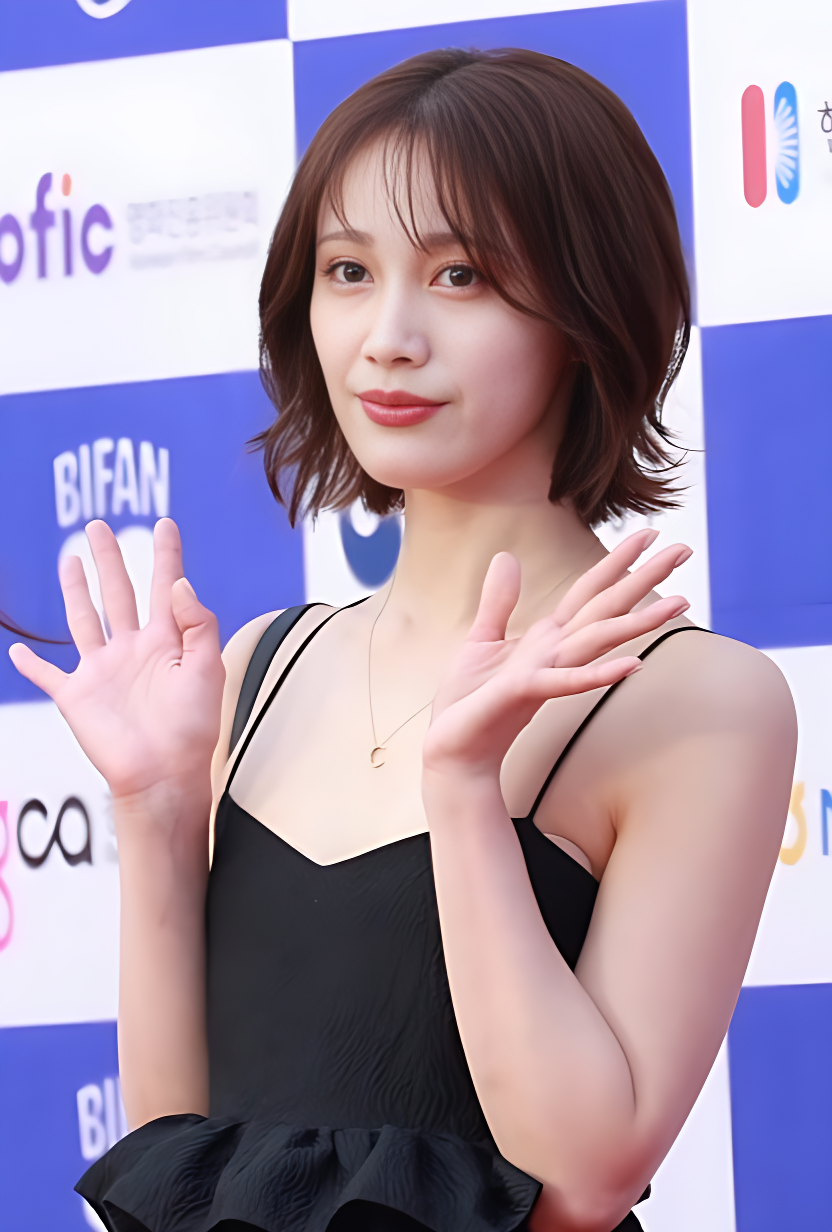
- Born: March 4, 1997 (age 29); Kanagawa Prefecture, Japan
- Occupation: Actress
- Years active: 2011–present
- Agent: Stardust Promotion (until 2023)
- Known for: Kakegurui; Chaser Game W
- Musical career
- Genres: J-pop
- Instrument: Vocals
- Labels: Imperial; Starry

Yurika Nakamura (born March 4, 1997) (Japanese: 中村 ゆりか) is a Japanese actress. She is known for her roles in Kakegurui franchise and Chaser Game W.

== Career ==
Born to a Japanese father and a Taiwanese mother, she entered the entertainment industry after being scouted in Shibuya when she was in her first year of junior high school.

She played several roles in some series such as Inside Mari, Kakegurui, and Chaser Game W.

== Filmography ==
=== TV series ===
| Year | Title | Role | Notes | Ref. |
|---|---|---|---|---|
| 2015 | Mare | Minami Ikehata | Asadora | |
| 2017 | Inside Mari | Yori Kakiguchi | | |
| 2017 | Flower and the Beast | Kumi Kumakura | 2 seasons | |
| 2018–19 | Kakegurui | Sayaka Igarashi | 2 seasons | |
| 2020 | Guilty: Kono Koi wa Tsumi Desu ka | Rui Oikawa | | |
| 2021 | Kakegurui Twin | Sayaka Igarashi | Eps. 1, 3, 6 | |
| 2024 | Chaser Game W | Fuyu Hayashi | Lead role; 2 seasons | |
| 2026 | Water Margin | Deng Lihua | | |

=== Film ===
| Year | Title | Role | Notes | Ref. |
|---|---|---|---|---|
| 2019 | Kakegurui | Sayaka Igarashi | | |
| 2021 | Kakegurui 2: Ultimate Russian Roulette | Sayaka Igarashi | | |
| 2025 | My Beloved Stranger | Rumi Kaneko | | |
| 2026 | Chaser Game W: A Match Made in Heaven | Fuyu Hayashi | Lead role | |
