= Ruka Matsuda =

Japanese actress (born 1995)

- 松田 るか
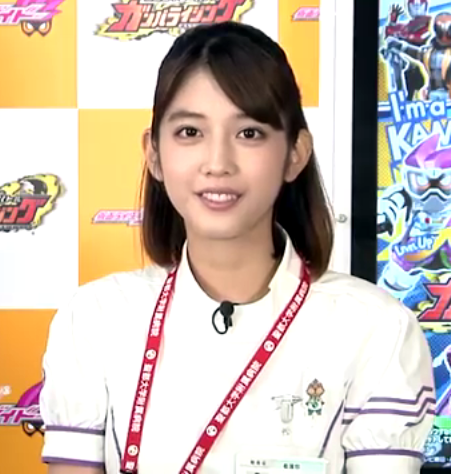
- Matsuda in 2016
- Born: October 30, 1995 (age 30); Okinawa Prefecture, Japan
- Occupation: Actress
- Years active: 2011–present
- Agent: Grick
- Website: Official profile

Ruka Matsuda (松田 るか, Matsuda Ruka; born 30 October 1995, in Okinawa Prefecture, Japan) is a Japanese actress. She is represented by Grick.

== Filmography ==
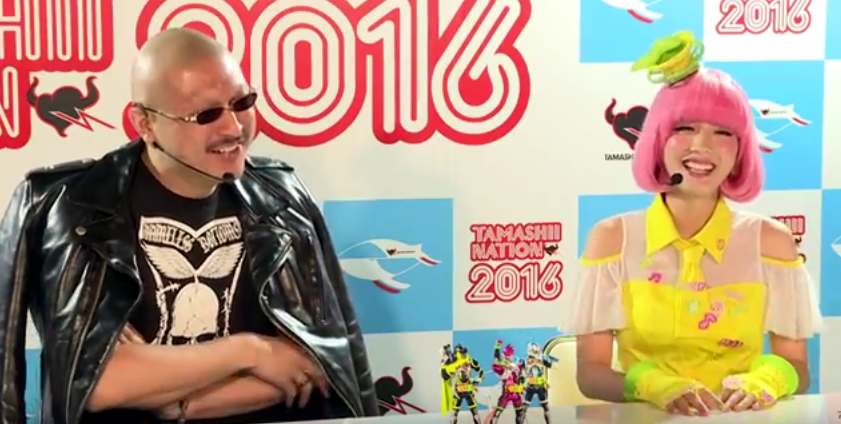
Matsuda as Poppy Pipopapo (right) with Mafia Kajita in 2016

=== TV dramas ===
Year	Title	Role	Notes	Ref.
2016	Kamen Rider Ex-Aid	Asuna Karino/Poppy Pipopapo/Kamen Rider Poppy		
2018	Kakegurui Live Action	Itsuki Sumeragi		
2019–20	Scarlet	Mana Ishii	Asadora	
2020	Yokai Housemate	Shimada Ai	Episode 3	
2021	Ryūkō Kanbō		Television film	
2024	Dear Radiance	Minamoto no Ikuko	Taiga drama	

=== Films ===
Year	Title	Role	Notes	Ref.
2016	Kamen Rider Heisei Generations: Dr. Pac-Man vs. Ex-Aid & Ghost with Legend Riders	Asuna Karino/Poppy Pipopapo		
2019	Back Street Girls: Gokudols	Ryo/Mari Tachibana		
2019	Kakegurui	Itsuki Sumeragi		
2019	Toshimaen: Haunted Park	Sato Ami		
2021	Kakegurui 2: Ultimate Russian Roulette	Itsuki Sumeragi		
2022	School Lunch of Ashiya City	Nana Nonomura	Lead role	
2023	Knuckle Girl	Kanako Handa		
2024	The Dancing Okami			
2025	Kanasando		Lead role	
2025	Step Out			

=== Stage ===
Year	Title	Role	Notes	Ref.
2025	Wonder 3	Bokko		

=== Anime ===
Year	Title	Role	Notes	Ref.
2012	Haitai Nanafa	Kyan Nanaitoguchi		
