= Elaiza Ikeda =

Japanese model, actress, and singer (born 1996)

- Born: 16 April 1996 (age 30); Philippines
- Citizenship: Japan
- Occupations: Model; actress; singer
- Years active: 2009–present
- Hometown: Fukuoka City, Japan
- Modeling information
- Height: 1.70 m (5 ft 7 in)
- Hair color: black
- Eye color: brown

Japanese name
- Kanji: 池田 エライザ
- Hiragana: いけだ エライザ
Transcriptions
- Romanization: Ikeda Elaiza
- Website: ikedaelaiza.jp

Elaiza Ikeda (池田 エライザ, Ikeda Eraiza; born April 16, 1996) is a Philippine-born Japanese actress, fashion model and singer. She began modeling in 2009 after winning the "Grand Prix Nicola Model Audition 2009".

== Personal life ==
Elaiza Ikeda was born on April 16, 1996, in the Philippines and was raised in Fukuoka City, Japan, to a Filipina mother and a Japanese father. Her family consists of her mother, father, two older brothers, and one younger brother.

Ikeda has a pet lovebird named "Pijon", Two female cats, "Shampoo" and "Biscuit", and a male cat named "Judal".

== Filmography ==
=== Film ===
| Year | Title | Role | Notes | Ref. |
|---|---|---|---|---|
| 2015 | The Virgin Psychics | Miyuki Hirano | | |
| 2016 | Wolf Girl and Black Prince | Aki Tezuka | | |
| 2017 | ReLIFE | Rena Kariu | | |
| 2017 | Tori Girl | Kazumi Shimamura | | |
| 2017 | Make a Bow and Kiss | Anne Kishimoto | Lead role | |
| 2018 | The Many Faces of Ito | Satoko Aida / C | | |
| 2018 | My Little Monster | Asako Natsume | | |
| 2018 | Sunny: Our Hearts Beat Together | Nana | | |
| 2018 | Million Dollar Man | | | |
| 2019 | Sadako | Mayu Akikawa | Lead role | |
| 2019 | Kakegurui – Compulsive Gambler | Kirari Momobami / Ririka Momobami | | |
| 2020 | Town Without Sea | | Director | |
| 2020 | Not Quite Dead Yet | | | |
| 2021 | Kiba: The Fangs of Fiction | | | |
| 2021 | Kakegurui – Compulsive Gambler Part 2 | Kirari Momobami / Ririka Momobami | | |
| 2022 | The Midnight Maiden War | | | |
| 2022 | Haw | Momoko | | |
| 2023 | Confess to Your Crimes | Mayumi Ogata | | |
| 2025 | Rewrite | Miyuki | Lead role | |
| 2027 | Sins of Kujo: The Movie | Hitomi Yakushimae | | |

=== Television ===
| Year | Title | Role | Notes | Ref. |
|---|---|---|---|---|
| 2017 | Hokusai to Meshi Saereba | Ayako Arikawa | | |
| 2017 | Himana Joshidai Sei | Mayu Mita | Lead role | |
| 2017 | Inside Mari | Mari Yoshizaki | Lead role | |
| 2019 | Hidarikiki no Eren | Eren Yamagishi | Lead role | |
| 2020 | Followers | Natsume Hyakuta | | |
| 2021 | Komi Can't Communicate | Shouko Komi | Lead role | |
| 2022 | Umeko: The Face of Female Education | Yamakawa Sutematsu | Television film | |
| 2022 | Doronjo | Nao Dorokawa / Doronjo | Lead role | |
| 2022 | Inori no Karte: Kenshūi no Nazotoki Shinsatsu Kiroku | Midori Soneda | | |
| 2024 | The Great Passage | Midori Kishibe | Lead role | |
| 2024 | Tokyo Swindlers | Rei Kuramochi | | |
| 2024 | The Diamond Sleeping Under the Sea | Rina | | |
| 2026 | Sins of Kujo | Hitomi Yakushimae | | |

=== Music videos ===
- sub/objective (2015)
- CITI (2015)
- Sunrise(re-build) (2016)

== Awards and nominations ==
Year presented, name of the award ceremony, category, nominee(s) of the award, and the result of the nomination
| Year | Award ceremony | Category | Nominated work(s) | Result | Ref. |
|---|---|---|---|---|---|
| 2009 | 13th Nicola Model Audition | Grand Prix | Herself | Won | |
| 2015 | Best Styling Awards 2015 | Teen category | Herself | Won | |
| 2016 | Eye of the Year 2016 | Model category | Herself | Won | |
| 2020 | Elle Cinema Awards | New Director Award | Town Without Sea | Won | |
