= Aoi Morikawa =

Japanese actress

- 森川 葵
- Born: June 17, 1995 (age 31); Aichi Prefecture, Japan
- Occupations: Actress; model
- Years active: 2010–present
- Agent: Stardust Promotion
- Height: 1.57 m (5 ft 2 in)

Aoi Morikawa (森川 葵, Morikawa Aoi; born June 17, 1995, in Aichi Prefecture) is a Japanese actress and model who is affiliated with Stardust Promotion.

== Biography ==
Morikawa was born in Aichi Prefecture in 1995. She is part of a family of five including two brothers, being the only daughter.

On August 18, 2010, Seventeen readers were invited to the Seventeen Summer School Festival event at Ryōgoku Kokugikan, an event featuring Morikawa and four other models, including Ayaka Miyoshi, named as Miss Seventeen 2010 winners and subsequently debuting with the magazine after having been selected from 5,575 applicants.

On February 28, 2015, it was announced in Seventeen that she would graduate from her position of an exclusive model with the magazine in May of the same year.

== Filmography ==
=== TV series ===
Year	Title	Role	Notes	Ref.
2013	No Dropping Out: Back to School at 35	Hitomi Eto		
2016	Love That Makes You Cry	Konatsu Ichimura		
2018	Kakegurui	Mary Sotome		
2020	A Day-Off of Ryoma Takeuchi	Miho Saeki	Episode 8	
2021	Kakegurui Twins	Mary Sotome		
2022	Namba MG5	Miyuki Fujita		
2023	Homeru Hito Homerareru Hito	Eiko Ichikawa	Lead role	
2024	Ōoku: The Palace	Ochiho		
2026	Human Vapor	Mimi		

=== Films ===
Year	Title	Role	Notes	Ref.
2014	The World of Kanako	Tomoko Nagano		
2014	Gekijōban Zero	Michi Kazato		
2015	Tsuugaku Series Tsuugaku Tochu	Yuki		
2016	Gold Medal Man			
2017	Flower and Sword	Ren		
2017	My Teacher	Megumi Chigusa		
2017	Love and Lies	Aoi Nisaka	Lead role	
2018	Over Drive	Hikaru Endō		
2018	We Make Antiques!	Imari Ōhara		
2018	River's Edge	Kanna Tajima		
2019	Kakegurui – Compulsive Gambler	Mary Saotome		
2019	We Make Antiques! Kyoto Rendezvous	Imari Ōhara		
2013	Schoolgirl Complex	Manami Shintani	Lead role	
2016	Too Young To Die!	Hiromi Tezuka		
2017	Love and Lies	Aoi Nisaka	Lead role	
2018	Over Drive	Hikaru Endo		
2019	Kakegurui	Mary Sotome		
2020	Looking for Magical Doremi	Sola Nagase (voice)	Lead role	
2020	Godai: The Wunderkind	Haru		
2021	Kakegurui 2: Ultimate Russian Roulette	Mary Saotome		
2023	We Make Antiques! Osaka Dreams	Imari Ōhara		
2024	In an Isolated Cottage on a Snowy Mountain	Masami Asakura		
2024	Angry Squad: The Civil Servant and the Seven Swindlers	Shiraishi		
2025	Gosh!!			
2025	Lupin the IIIrd the Movie: The Immortal Bloodline	Sarifa (voice)		
2026	Your Own Quiz	Yoriko		
2026	The Potentials	Yuki Shiota		
