= Cheat Slayer =

Japanese manga

- Killing the People Reincarnated into the Other World: Cheat Slayer
- Promotional artwork

異世界転生者殺し -チートスレイヤー- (Isekai Tenseisha-goroshi: Chīto Sureiyā)
- Genre: Isekai; Parody
- Manga
- Written by: Homura Kawamoto
- Illustrated by: Aki Yamaguchi
- Published by: Fujimi Shobo
- Magazine: Monthly Dragon Age
- Published: June 9, 2021

Killing the People Reincarnated into the Other World: Cheat Slayer (Japanese: 異世界転生者殺し -チートスレイヤー-, Hepburn: Isekai Tenseisha-goroshi: Chīto Sureiyā) is a Japanese isekai manga written by Homura Kawamoto and illustrated by Aki Yamaguchi. The action is set in a parallel fantasy world, and revolves around a boy who confronts characters who have been abusing supernatural powers ("cheats"), which they gained after dying and being reincarnated as his world's new inhabitants. The series debuted on June 9, 2021, in Fujimi Shobo's shōnen magazine Monthly Dragon Age. However, the series was cancelled after just one chapter when readers highlighted the similarities between the villains in Cheat Slayer and heroes in similar works.

== Plot ==
Cheat Slayer follows Lute, a villager who respects and wants to join a guild called "Rebels Against God", which consists of people reincarnated into the world and who fight against the Demon Lord's army. Among the crimes the Rebels Against God commit are burning down a village, breaking a man's neck, and raping the protagonist's childhood sweetheart. The story begins when a person who Lute admires, Louis Crawford, appears. When the series was revealed on May 8, 2021, it was described as a revenge story "coated in hate and desire".

== Characters ==
Lute (リュート, Ryūto)
A resident of Murabito Village with aspirations to join the Rebels Against God.
Lydia (リディア, Ridia)
A fellow resident of Murabito Village.

=== Rebels Against God ===
Honda Yuya (ホンダ・ユウヤ, Honda Yūya)
Also known as "Looper". He bears a resemblance to Subaru Natsuki from Tappei Nagatsuki's novel series Re:Zero.
Louis Crawford (ルイ・クロフォード, Rui Kurofōdo)
Also known as "God's Mistake". He bears a resemblance to Shin Wolford from Tsuyoshi Yoshioka's novel series Wise Man's Grandchild.
Flare (フレア, Furea)
Also known as "The Fallen Goddess". She bears a resemblance to Aqua from Jitakukeibihei's novel series KonoSuba.
Imerda Piñata (イメルダ・ピニャータ, Imeruda Pinyāta)
Also known as "The Daughter Villainess". She bears a resemblance to Catarina Claes from Satoru Yamaguchi's novel series My Next Life as a Villainess: All Routes Lead to Doom!.
Kilt (キルト, Kiruto)
Also known as "The Dual Wielding Black Knight". He bears a resemblance to Kirito from Reki Kawahara's novel series Sword Art Online.
Anastasia Melokva (アナスタシア・メロクヴァ, Anasutashia Merokuva)
Also known as "The Young Demon". She bears a resemblance to Tanya von Degurechaff from Carlo Zen's novel series The Saga of Tanya the Evil.
Roro Sendiger (ロロ・センディガー, Roro Sendigā)
Also known as "The Named Slime". She bears a resemblance to Rimuru Tempest from Fuse's novel series That Time I Got Reincarnated as a Slime.
Yukiko Shijo (四条 雪子, Shijō Yukiko)
Also known as "Otherworld Restaurant". She bears a resemblance to Aletta from Junpei Inuzuka's novel series Restaurant to Another World.
Don Will Dead (ドーン・ウィル・デッド, Dōn Uiru Deddo)
Also known as "The Undead King". He bears a mixture resemblance to Ainz Ooal Gown from Kugane Maruyama's novel series Overlord and Elias Ainsworth from Kore Yamazaki's manga series The Ancient Magus' Bride.

== Controversy and cancellation ==
When Cheat Slayer was released, readers noticed that various members of the Rebels Against God resembled characters taken from other isekai series. Following this realization, the editorial department at Monthly Dragon Age reinspected the series. They declared that depicting characters that looked so similar to those from other series as villains would cause problems, as the creators may believe Kawamoto and Yamaguchi were intentionally denigrating particular works. As a result, the department apologized to the creators and others involved and said they would "pay more attention to prevent similar issues in the future". Among those who were critical of Cheat Slayer was Rifujin na Magonote, author of Mushoku Tensei, who wrote on Twitter: "'Making characters appear who are recognizably borrowed from characters from other works, and then turning them into villains and making them do vile things'. This is crossing the line".

Kawamoto issued a public apology on his Twitter account, saying: "I deeply apologize for all the pain, concerns, and fuss I have caused to everyone related to this incident. I created a work that was lacking in due consideration, and I am ashamed to have caused an incident like this. Going forward, my shame about my actions will encourage me to create better works. I am deeply sorry". Fuse, author of That Time I Got Reincarnated as a Slime, responded to the apology in a blog saying: "I have received an apology from the Dragon Age editorial department. For an author, the character's image is important, so I request that if you do a parody, you do not overdo it".

According to Michael Lacerna of Comic Book Resources (CBR), while there are isekai series which parody or subvert the genre, "Isekai Tenseisha Koroshi -Cheat Slayer- seems to have sparked discussions within the industry of what qualifies as a parody and what crosses the line into infringement or personal attacks". Timothy Donohoo, also writing for CBR, has argued that the series was meant to be an attack on the isekai genre, and while parodies are normally defended as fair use, Donohoo has suggested that due to many of the works still being made, the creators were more likely to notice anything suspect.

Kara Dennison from Otaku USA suggested that controversy may have been avoided by rethinking the character parodies, using a more diverse range of crimes committed by the villains, and using the series to make a statement on the isekai genre in general.

On July 22, 2021, it was announced that Kawamoto would be working with Zuzu Kamiya to create another isekai series entitled Humanity's Existence Depends on Love Gambling with Another World's Princess, which debuted in Champion Red on August 19, 2021.
