= List of Kakegurui chapters =

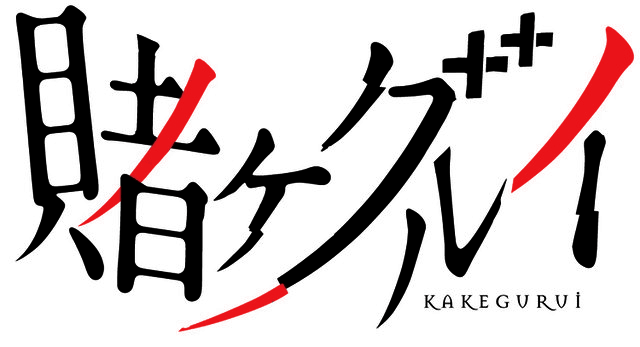
The official logo of Kakegurui – Compulsive Gambler.

The Kakegurui – Compulsive Gambler manga is written by Homura Kawamoto and illustrated by Tōru Naomura. It has been serialized in Square Enix's Gangan Joker since March 22, 2014. It is licensed for English released in North America by Yen Press. A prequel spin-off manga, Kakegurui Twin, began serialization in Gangan Joker on September 21, 2015.

== Main series ==
=== Kakegurui – Compulsive Gambler ===
No.	Original release date	Original ISBN	English release date	English ISBN
1	October 22, 2014	978-4-7575-4449-9	July 18, 2017	978-0-316-56289-8
01. "A Girl Named Yumeko Jabami" (蛇喰夢子という女, "Jabami Yumeko to iu onna"); 02. "A Boring Girl"; 03. "The Slit-Eyed Girl"; 04. "The Crazed Girls of Hyakkaou Academy"
New transfer student Yumeko Jabami is guided about the school by house pet classmate Ryōta Suzui. She is challenged by Mary Saotome to a jankenpon (rock-paper-scissors)-styled gambling game. At first, Yumeko wins and loses a few rounds, and ends up out of chips, but she figures out how Mary has fixed the game in her favor, and when the stakes are raised, soundly beats her. She frees Suzui of his debt and becomes friends with him, revealing she has a maniacal passion for gambling. Yumeko is then challenged by card expert Itsuki Sumeragi to a game of two-deck Concentration. Although Yumeko loses the first game, when Itsuki mentions she can wager her own fingernails, Yumeko accepts the challenge and then defeats her after seeing through her card marking. Yumeko is challenged by Traditional Culture Research Club president Yuriko Nishinotōin to a roulette-like game called "Life or Death". Although she determines how Nishinotōin was able to scam so many people in the game, her final big wager does not go the way she expected, and she becomes a pet, after which she suspects the student council has taken extra measures to fix the game.
2	December 22, 2014	978-4-7575-4510-6	September 19, 2017	978-0-316-56298-0
05. "The Girl Who Is Now a Housepet"; 06. "The Girls Fighting Their Way Back Up"; 07. "The Lying Girl"; 08. "The Girl Is Human Again"; 09. "The Girl's Resistance"
With 310 million yen in debt, Yumeko is now a pet. Yumeko and Mary receive Life Schedules in which all their future career and family choices will be pre-determined if they are unable to clear their debts. Yumeko meets bullying student Jun Kiwatari who tries to use his position as master to make her undress, but a crazed schoolmate named Midari Ikishima who carries a pistol for Russian roulette intervenes. Yumeko and Mary join a debt reassignment contest in which they can assume the lesser debts of one of the other players depending on how they finish, and of which the winner would be cleared of their debt. They are grouped with a quiet girl named Tsubomi Nanami, and Kiwatari who borrowed money to join in to humiliate the girls and is also Tsubomi's master. During the game of Indian poker, Yumeko reveals how Kiwatari has been getting signs from Tsubomi on her cards, but that she and Mary have also been giving signs to each other, and it now comes down to who can bluff the best. They convince Tsubomi to not listen to Kiwatari's advice and to free herself from thinking she is just to be a pet. Although Kiwatari thinks he has won the game, he learns that he placed last overall, as Yumeko and Mary had switched the values of their chips.
3	June 22, 2015	978-4-7575-4672-1	November 14, 2017	978-0-316-41280-3
10. "Inviting Girl"; 11. "Excited Girl"; 12. "Open Girl"; 13. "Delighted Girl"; 14. "Ideal Girl"; 15. "Overpowering Girl"; 16. "Refusing Girls"
Although Mary has paid off her debt and is no longer a pet, she gives the rest of their winnings to Yumeko, who does not plan to pay off her debt yet so that she could challenge the student council president Kirari. Student council member Midari abducts Yumeko and Ryota, and challenges Yumeko to an ESP Russian roulette game: Each player must guess a sequence of five Zener cards; the one who gets the most correct gets to choose one of two revolvers in a box which were preloaded by the players with 0-6 bullets in its chambers, and shoot the other player a number of times based on the difference in their scores. Yumeko agrees to play with the conditions that they play only three rounds, that Ryota be the dealer, and that the loser must pay 1 billion yen, while Midari adds the condition that if the shooter intentionally misses, the other player can then shoot back. In the first round, Midari wins by 1 guess but picks and shoots Yumeko's unloaded revolver. In the second round, Yumeko wins by guessing correctly that Ryota would choose her previous guess as the sequence, but she again picks her unloaded revolver because she can determine its difference in weight. Midari reveals how she lost her eye when she challenged and lost to Kirari. In the third round, Midari and Yumeko each load two chambers, but Yumeko realizes the camera at Ryota's room is reversed, based on which hand he uses on the cards. But instead of going for a win over Midari, which would have guaranteed that Midari would be shot, she intentionally guesses all wrong, leading to a draw. Meanwhile, Mary is recruited by Kirari to join the student council, but upon learning how Kirari has viewed the house pets, she declines.
4	December 22, 2015	978-4-7575-4837-4	January 23, 2018	978-0-316-48003-1
17. "The Loving Girl"; 18. "The Targeted Girl"; 19. "The Dreaming Girl"; 20. "Perfectly Trained Girl"; 21. "Dream Singing Girl"
5	May 21, 2016	978-4-7575-4983-8	April 17, 2018	978-0-316-44756-0
22. "The Sovereign Girl"; 23. "The Selective Girl"; 24. "The Manipulated Girl"; 25. "The Whispering Girl"; 26. "The Revealing Girl"; 27. "The Effusing Girl"
6	February 22, 2017	978-4-7575-5251-7	July 17, 2018	978-0-316-44759-1
28. "The Passing Girl"; 29. "The Witnessing Girl"; 30. "The Offering Girl"; 31. "The Enthralled Girl"; 32. "The Clinging Girl"; 33. "The Logical Girl"
7	June 22, 2017	978-4-7575-5382-8	October 30, 2018	978-1-9753-0259-7
34. "Shine, Girls"; 35. "Clan Girl"; 36. "Confronting Girls"; 37. "Attempted Girl"; 38. "Enraged Girls"
8	August 22, 2017	978-4-7575-5448-1	January 22, 2019	978-1-9753-0262-7
39. "Selfless Girl"; 40. "Enclosing Girl"; 41. "Do Not Touch This Girl"; 42. "Tuned-in Girls"; 43. "Weakened Girl"
9	January 27, 2018	978-4-7575-5594-5	March 19, 2019	978-1-9753-0372-3
44. "Squirming Girls"; 45. "Resolute Girl"; 46. "Tempted Girl"; 47. "Traitorous Girl"; 48. "Pursued Girl"; 49. "Resolute Girl"
10	August 22, 2018	978-4-7575-5816-8	June 18, 2019	978-1-9753-3049-1
50. "Changing Girl"; 51. "Harmonious Girl"; 52. "Singing Girls"; 53. "All-Or-Nothing Girls"; 54. "Wavering Girl"; 55. "Hollywood-Star Girl (Part 1)"; 56. "Hollywood-Star Girl (Part 2)"
11	March 22, 2019	978-4-7575-6000-0	December 31, 2019	978-1-9753-8754-9
57. "Predicting Girl"; 58. "Immoral Girl"; 59. "Deceived Girl"; 60. "Imprinted Girl"; 61. "Despising Girl"; 62. "Lie-Unraveling Girl (Part 1)"
12	December 21, 2019	978-4-7575-6437-4	July 21, 2020	978-1-9753-1519-1
63. "Purchasing Girl"; 64. "Gathering Girls"; 65. "Gnawing Girl"; 66. "Fighting Girls"; 67. "The Girl who Only Smiles"; 68. "Yin-Yang Girl"; 69. "Yin-Yang Girls"
13	June 22, 2020	978-4-7575-6703-0	May 18, 2021	978-1-9753-2448-3
70. "That Girl"; 71. "Steady Girl"; 72. "Fearful Girl"; 73. "The Will of the Girls"; 74. "Entangled Girl"; 75. "Harvesting Girl"
14	February 22, 2021	978-4-7575-7101-3	March 1, 2022	978-1-9753-4070-4
76. "Twin Girls"; 77. "Genuine Girls"; 78. "Selecting Girl"; 79. "Docile Girl"; 80. "Happy Girl (Part 1)"; 80.5. "Happy Girl (Part 2)"; 81. "Sure-win Girl"; 82. "Dazzling Girl"
15	October 21, 2021	978-4-7575-7533-2	September 20, 2022	978-1-9753-4960-8
83. "The Identical Girls (Part 1)"; 83.5. "The Identical Girls (Part 2)"; 84. "The Meddlesome Girls"; 85. "The Ecstatic Girl"; 86. "The Forcing Girl"; 87. "The Becoming Girl"; 88. "The Upright Girl (Part 1)"; 88.5. "The Upright Girl (Part 2)"
16	September 22, 2022	978-4-7575-8147-0	May 23, 2023	978-1-9753-6917-0
89. "The World-Destroying Girl (Part 1)"; 89.5. "The World-Destroying Girl (Part 2)"; 90. "The Outbidding Girl"; 91. "The Two Girls"; 92. "Sisters; 93. "The Overeager Girl"; 94. "The Unforeseen Girl (Part 1)"; 94.5. "The Unforeseen Girl (Part 2)"; 95. "The Compulsive Girls"
17	July 22, 2023	978-4-7575-8674-1	September 17, 2024	979-8-8554-0223-0
18	July 22, 2024	978-4-7575-9308-4	June 24, 2025	979-8-8554-1595-7
19	March 22, 2025	978-4-7575-9760-0	December 16, 2025	979-8-8554-2660-1
20	October 22, 2025	978-4-301-00124-9	November 24, 2026	979-8-8554-4020-1
21	March 21, 2026	978-4-301-00401-1	—	—
22	September 18, 2026	978-4-301-00771-5	—	—

== Spin-offs ==
=== Kakegurui Twin ===
No.	Original release date	Original ISBN	English release date	English ISBN
1	December 22, 2015	978-4-7575-4838-1	February 19, 2019	978-1-9753-0338-9
2	May 21, 2016	978-4-7575-4984-5	May 28, 2019	978-1-9753-0339-6
3	February 22, 2017	978-4-7575-5252-4	September 3, 2019	978-1-9753-0340-2
4	June 22, 2017	978-4-7575-5383-5	November 26, 2019	978-1-9753-0341-9
5	July 22, 2017	978-4-7575-5414-6	February 18, 2020	978-1-9753-0342-6
6	January 27, 2018	978-4-7575-5595-2	May 26, 2020	978-1-9753-0343-3
7	August 22, 2018	978-4-7575-5817-5	September 22, 2020	978-1-9753-1383-8
8	March 22, 2019	978-4-7575-6064-2	December 1, 2020	978-1-9753-1386-9
9	December 21, 2019	978-4-7575-6438-1	March 9, 2021	978-1-9753-1389-0
10	June 22, 2020	978-4-7575-6704-7	June 29, 2021	978-1-9753-2441-4
11	February 22, 2021	978-4-7575-7102-0	October 18, 2022	978-1-9753-4072-8
12	October 21, 2021	978-4-7575-7534-9	December 13, 2022	978-1-9753-4962-2
13	September 22, 2022	978-4-7575-8148-7	July 18, 2023	978-1-9753-6983-5
14	July 22, 2023	978-4-7575-8675-8	October 15, 2024	979-8-8554-0225-4
15	July 22, 2024	978-4-7575-9309-1	August 26, 2025	979-8-8554-1597-1

=== Kakegurui (Kakkokari) ===
No.	Japanese release date	Japanese ISBN
1	June 22, 2017	978-4-7575-5384-2
2	August 22, 2017	978-4-7575-5449-8
3	January 27, 2018	978-4-7575-5596-9
4	August 22, 2018	978-4-7575-5818-2
5	March 22, 2019	978-4-7575-6065-9
6	December 21, 2019	978-4-7575-6439-8
7	June 22, 2020	978-4-7575-6705-4
8	February 22, 2021	978-4-7575-7103-7
9	October 21, 2021	978-4-7575-7535-6
10	July 22, 2023	978-4-7575-8676-5

=== Kakegurui Midari ===
No.	Japanese release date	Japanese ISBN
1	July 22, 2017	978-4-7575-5415-3
2	January 27, 2018	978-4-7575-5597-6
3	August 22, 2018	978-4-7575-5819-9
4	June 22, 2020	978-4-7575-6706-1
