= Isekai Executioner: The Serial Killer in Another World =

Japanese manga series

- First tankōbon volume cover

シリアルキラー異世界に降り立つ (Shiriaru Kirā Isekai ni Oritatsu)
- Genre: Isekai; Suspense
- Manga
- Written by: Homura Kawamoto
- Illustrated by: Hiro
- Published by: Shōnen Gahōsha
- English publisher: NA: Orange Inc.
- Imprint: Young King Comics
- Magazine: Young King Lambda
- Original run: May 25, 2022 – present
- Volumes: 9
- Manga

Serial Killer Isekai ni Oritatsu: Isekai Battle Royale
- Written by: Homura Kawamoto
- Illustrated by: Hiro
- Published by: Shōnen Gahōsha
- Imprint: Young King Comics
- Magazine: Young King
- Original run: August 9, 2024 – present
- Volumes: 4

Isekai Executioner: The Serial Killer in Another World (シリアルキラー異世界に降り立つ, Shiriaru Kirā Isekai ni Oritatsu) is a Japanese manga series written by Homura Kawamoto and illustrated by Hiro. It began serialization in Shōnen Gahōsha's Young King Lambda online magazine in May 2022.

== Plot ==
An unnamed serial killer is caught and executed. A goddess offers him reincarnation, but he regrets killing innocent people because of his urge to kill. The goddess offers redemption because she previously reincarnated 12 people to another world with special powers to defeat a demon king, but after defeating him, they gave in to greed, sadism, and a lust for power and are killing and bullying the citizens. The serial killer is reincarnated into that world as a girl named Shirukyi with no powers other than a pragmatic fighting style and charged with killing the other reincarnators. Shirukyi revels in being able to kill people who genuinely deserve it.

== Publication ==
Written by Homura Kawamoto and illustrated by Hiro, Isekai Executioner: The Serial Killer in Another World began serialization in Shōnen Gahōsha's Young King Lambda online magazine on May 25, 2022. Its chapters have been collected into nine tankōbon volumes as of August 2026. The series is licensed digitally in English by Orange Inc.

A spin-off manga by the same author and illustrator, titled Serial Killer Isekai ni Oritatsu: Isekai Battle Royale (シリアルキラー異世界に降り立つ 異世界バトルロイヤル, Shiriaru Kirā Isekai ni Oritatsu Isekai Batoru Roiyaru), began serialization in Shōnen Gahōsha's seinen manga magazine Young King on August 9, 2024. The spin-off's chapters have been collected into four tankōbon volumes as of August 2026.

=== Volumes ===
No.	Release date	ISBN
1	December 26, 2022	978-4-7859-7302-5
2	April 24, 2023	978-4-7859-7376-6
3	November 27, 2023	978-4-7859-7537-1
4	June 6, 2024	978-4-7859-7676-7
5	December 6, 2024	978-4-7859-7820-4
6	May 2, 2025	978-4-7859-7929-4
7	December 26, 2025	978-4-7859-8107-5
8	April 13, 2026	978-4-7859-8168-6
9	August 10, 2026	978-4-7859-8256-0

=== Serial Killer Isekai ni Oritatsu: Isekai Battle Royale ===
No.	Release date	ISBN
1	January 7, 2025	978-4-7859-7845-7
2	June 9, 2025	978-4-7859-7954-6
3	December 26, 2025	978-4-7859-8108-2
4	August 10, 2026	978-4-7859-8257-7
