= High Card =

Japanese multimedia franchise

- Anime key visual
- Created by: Homura Kawamoto; Hikaru Muno; TMS Entertainment
- Manga

High Card -♢9 No Mercy
- Written by: Homura Kawamoto
- Illustrated by: Ebimo
- Published by: Square Enix
- Magazine: Manga Up!
- Original run: August 31, 2022 – present
- Volumes: 3
- Anime television series
- Directed by: Junichi Wada
- Written by: Naoki Kuroyanagi (Note: Series composition); Kenichi Yamashita (Note: Screenplay); Kazuhiko Inukai; Shingo Nagai
- Music by: Ryo Takahashi
- Studio: Studio Hibari (animation); TMS Entertainment (production)
- Licensed by: Crunchyroll (streaming); SEA: Plus Media Networks Asia
- Original network: AT-X, Tokyo MX, BS11, KBS Kyoto, SUN, TV Aichi
- Original run: January 9, 2023 – November 5, 2024
- Episodes: 25
- icon

High Card (stylized in all caps) is a Japanese multimedia franchise created by Homura Kawamoto, Hikaru Muno, and TMS Entertainment. It consists of a manga series, a novel series, drama CDs, and an anime television series produced by TMS and animated by Studio Hibari, which aired from January to March 2023, with its second season aired from January to March 2024. The project's theme is poker, with everything from the title to the names of fictional locations referencing some form of playing card game.

During a preview of the anime series at Anime NYC in November 2022, Kawamoto and Muno further explained that High Card was heavily inspired by the Kingsman movies, including their decision to put the setting in a fictional kingdom outside of Japan, hoping to appeal to a wider audience across the world.

== Plot ==
The royal family of the Kingdom of Fourland holds a secret deck of 52 "X-Playing cards", each of which bestow a superhuman power or ability to whoever uses them. However, the cards were nearly stolen one month ago, and then scattered across the land. In the present, a thief named Finn is struggling to raise funds for his orphanage before the landlord clears it out. After hitching a ride to a casino, Finn soon finds himself inducted into High Card, a special group tasked by the King to recover all 52 cards, while working undercover as salesmen for the Pinochle car company.

High Card must deal with threats from rival car company "Who's Who" seeking to crush Pinochle, and the Klondike mafia family who wants the X-Playing cards for their own nefarious ends.

== Characters ==
The agents of High Card. From left to right: Vijay Kumar Singh, Leo Constantine Pinochle, Finn Oldman, Chris Redgrave and Wendy Sato.

=== Pinochle (High Card) ===
Finn Oldman (フィン・オールドマン, Fin Ōrudoman)
Voiced by: Gen Satō
The newest member of High Card, a skilled pickpocket with great eyesight and focus allowing him to think multiple steps ahead. After trying to quickly raise money to save the orphanage where he grew up, Finn soon found himself embroiled in the battle over the X-Playing cards. He holds the 2 of Spades, "Neo New Nambu", which summons a loaded Nambu revolver into his hand, and can summon extra bullets into his free hand.
Chris Redgrave (クリス・レッドグレイヴ, Kurisu Reddogureivu)
Voiced by: Toshiki Masuda
A flirty womanizer and skilled driver with a sweet tooth. He recruits Finn after seeing his skills first-hand in Bell End, and becomes his mentor at Pinochle's Old Maid branch. He wields the 5 of Hearts, "Calorie's High", allowing him to heal injuries instantly that would otherwise prove fatal by burning calories.
Leo Constantine Pinochle (レオ・コンスタンティン・ピノクル, Reo Konsutantin Pinokuru)
Voiced by: Shun Horie
The 14-year-old son of the Pinochle company's CEO, and the manager of the Old Maid office, with an abrasive demeanor that often grates on his colleagues. However, his position in society and his money puts him at the top of High Card. Leo wields the 7 of Diamonds, "Never No Dollars", which allows him to instantly swap nearby cash for an object of equivalent value.
Wendy Sato (ウェンディ・サトー, Wendi Satō)
Voiced by: Haruka Shiraishi
The daughter of a master swordsman from the Far East, Wendy handles the accounting for Pinochle's Old Maid office. She wields the Ace of Spades that summons "Love and Peace", a large sword with a mind of its own.
Vijay Kumar Singh (ヴィジャイ・クマール・シン, Vijai Kumāru Shin)
Voiced by: Yūichirō Umehara
A highly intelligent PhD student at the University of Cribbage and a good cook who manages the systems at Pinochle's Old Maid office, but his aloof personality makes him difficult to approach for most people. He wields the 3 of Clubs, with the power "Green Green", allowing him to communicate with nearby plants and control them.
Bernard Symons (バーナード・シモンズ, Bānādo Shimonzu)
Voiced by: Kazuhiro Yamaji
Leo's butler who serves as an administrator for High Card who does everything from serving tea to servicing cars at Pinochle's Old Maid branch. His card, the 9 of Spades, "Bokka", can summon an impenetrable shield that can transform into any shape.
Theodore Constantine Pinochle (セオドール・コンスタンティン・ピノクル, Seodōru Konsutantin Pinokuru)
Voiced by: Daisuke Ono
The CEO of Pinochle, Leo's father, one of the antagonists and the head of High Card who works directly under the King. His card the Queen of Diamonds, "Balor", grants enhanced vision, allowing him to see the player with the 7 of Hearts which grants invisibility, and possible X-ray vision.
Owen Alldays (オーウェン・オールデイズ, Ōwen Ōrudeizu)
Voiced by: Nobunaga Shimazaki
Theodore's personal secretary who carries out his orders faithfully. Owen wields the 8 of Diamonds, "Red Labyrinth" which allows him and other people to step into another dimension that's connected to every single door in Fourland.

=== Who's Who ===
Norman Kingstadt (ノーマン・キングスタット, Nōman Kingusutatto)
Voiced by: Toshihiko Seki
The flamboyant and charismatic CEO of "Who's Who" in a one-sided rivalry with his childhood friend Theodore, though he does not reciprocate.
Blist Blitz Broadhurst (ブリスト・ブリッツ・ブロードハースト, Burisuto Burittsu Burōdohāsuto)
Voiced by: Shunsuke Takeuchi
Norman's personal secretary and bodyguard. In contrast to his boss, Blist prefers to keep a strictly professional attitude while on the job, constantly reminding Norman about pay and labor regulations even as he works to collect X-Playing cards for him. He is also a Player with the 10 of Clubs, "Million Volt", which lets him channel electricity through his body.
Brandy Blumenthal (ブランディ・ブルーメンタール, Burandi Burūmentāru)
Voiced by: Mie Sonozaki
Norman's other personal secretary and bodyguard who sees his obsession with his rival and the X-Playing cards as a waste of time, even as she provides support for him. She is also a Player with the 7 of Spades, "Interceptor", which summons a high performance motorcycle which can be modified on the go with various modifications like missile launchers, sidecar, and machine guns.

=== Klondike ===
Ban Klondike (バン・クロンダイク, Ban Kurondaiku)
Voiced by: Tomokazu Seki
One of the antagonists.
The head of the Klondike family, known throughout Fourland as ruthless mafia boss, though he appears to have a softer side when dealing with women and children. Ban seeks the X-Playing cards for his own ends and has a shared history with Theodore and Norman. He has the King of Diamonds, "Round and Round", which allows him to rotate anything that he is touching or can't touch.
Tilt (ティルト, Tiruto)
Voiced by: Toshiyuki Toyonaga
A young Klondike executive who serves as a mediating force for inter-family struggles, and manages the search for the X-Playing cards. He has the King of Spades, "San Galgono", which grants him a knight armour and a sword. However the downside is that the card is able to take full control of your body, has its own consciousness and it own motives.
Bobby Ball (ボビー・ボール, Bobī Bōru)
Voiced by: Chiharu Sawashiro
A member of the Klondike family who works under Tilt to acquire the X-Playing cards, and is cruel to nearly everyone he meets. He wields the 3 of Diamonds, "Marble Rumble", that lets him turn anything he grabs into marbles, which he can then use as projectile weapons.
Zenon
Voiced by: Yoshitsugu Matsuoka
The Player with the Jack of Diamonds, "Out of Five", which allows him to affect the five senses and cognition of anyone that hears the sound created by scratching his gauntlets on a surface.
Burst
Voiced by: Miyuki Sawashiro
The Player with the Ace of Hearts, "Faceless", which allows her to copy the appearance of anyone she makes physical contact with, and allows her to use their X-Playing Card. In a relationship with TILT.

=== Others ===
Greg Young (グレッグ・ヤング, Gureggu Yangu)
Voiced by: Toshiyuki Morikawa
A veteran Inspector within the Shield Police Department, and one of the few people outside High Card who is aware of its existence as well as the X-Playing cards. Greg is an old friend of both Ban and Theodore.
Sugar Peace (シュガー・ピース, Shugā Pīsu)
Voiced by: Rie Takahashi
A novice detective who works under Greg.
Chelsea Hammond (チェルシー・ハモンド, Cherushī Hamondo)
Voiced by: Yurika Kubo
A social media influencer looking to find her "soulmate." A Player who holds the 2 of Diamonds, "Love Connection", which sticks two people's hands together. After an encounter with Finn and Chris, she later becomes a waitress at their local bar.
Michelle Redgrave (ミシェル・レッドグレイブ, Misheru Reddogureibu)
Voiced by: Yurie Kozakai
Chris's younger sister. She has a genetic disease inherited from her mother.
Lindsey Betz (リンジー・ベッツ, Rinjī Bettsu)
Voiced by: Eiji Hanawa
The Director of the Sun Fields Orphanage, a good-natured man struggling to keep the orphanage open while having trouble paying rent to an uncaring landlord.
Lucky Lunchman (ラッキー・ランチマン, Rakkī Ranchiman)
Voiced by: Shigeru Chiba
A card shark blessed with incredible luck thanks to the 10 of Diamonds ability, "Unlucky Poky", which granted him preternatural luck and thus prevented him from being harmed. After being threatened into giving up his card, he is soon killed after losing his luck along with the card.
Aya Tawawa (アーヤ・タワワ, Aya Tawawa)
Voiced by: Takako Honda
A former member of High Card 25 years ago who was part of a team previously led by Leo and Chris's fathers, Theodore and Tyler. However due to a decision made by Theodore regarding a young Chris, she dishearteningly left the team and exiled herself. Years later, she saves Finn and entrusts him with her Card, the J of Spades, "Coming Home" that allows her to pull any in-sight object towards her.
Chloe
Voiced by: Ayumi Mano

== Media ==
=== Anime ===
On June 9, 2021, it was announced that Homura Kawamoto, Hikaru Muno, and TMS Entertainment were working on a multimedia franchise, which include an anime television series. The project is done in collaboration with Kadokawa and Sammy Corporation.

The series is produced by TMS Entertainment, animated by Studio Hibari and directed by Junichi Wada, with Naoki Kuroyanagi handling series composition with Kenichi Yamashita, Kazuhiko Inukai and Shingo Nagai writing the episode screenplays; Nozomi Kawano designing the characters; and Ryo Takahashi composing the music. It aired from January 9 to March 27, 2023, on AT-X and other networks. The opening theme song is "Trickster", performed by Five New Old, while the ending theme song is "Squad!", performed by Meychan. Crunchyroll streamed the series.

A second season was announced at AnimeJapan on March 26, 2023, which aired from January 8 to March 25, 2024. The opening theme song is "Showdown", again performed by Five New Old, while the ending theme song is "Hakuchūmu" (白昼夢, Daydream), performed by Raon.

Following the final episode of the second season, it was announced that the series would receive a twenty-fifth episode. Titled The Flowers Bloom, the ONA episode was released on November 5, 2024.

==== Season 1 (2023) ====
No. overall	No. in season	Title	Directed by (Note: Information is taken from the ending credits of each episode.)	Written by	Storyboarded by	Original release date
1	1	"One Shot"	Tomohiro Matsukawa	Kenichi Yamashita	Junichi Wada	January 9, 2023
A girl named Iris infiltrates a castle, steals a suitcase from the vault, and escapes with a magic power that allows her to summon several explosives. However, an unseen woman summons a gust of wind that breaks open the case and scatters its contents, a special deck of playing cards, far and wide. One month later, a pickpocket named Finn steals items from multiple people. After overhearing that the landlord is planning to wipe out the Sun Fields Orphanage where he grew up to build luxury apartments, Finn tries to raise funds quickly, only to find that the pawn shop owner won't fence his stolen goods, except for a special 2 of Spades card that Finn refuses to part with. So Finn hitches a ride to Bell Land and hits a casino, winning at the poker table, until a card sharp named Lucky Lunchman cleans him out of his winnings. A casino pit boss takes both Finn and Lucky into a dark room, suspecting them of cheating. Suddenly, one of the guards unveils a 3 of Diamonds and transforms it into a pair of gloves that turn anything he grabs into marbles. The man threatens to kill Lucky's family until he releases his own card, the 10 of Diamonds. However, a car salesman with the 5 of Hearts appears and begins fighting with the fake guard. Finn steals the 10 of Diamonds and escapes in the confusion by stealing a car, only to find both men chasing after him. All three men manage to survive the fiery crash, but the marble man takes out the car salesman and demands Finn give him his card. Finn decides to test out his 2 of Spades, and summons a loaded revolver that pierces both the marble and the attacker's arm. However, the car salesman appears alive, as both he and Finn point their guns at each other.
2	2	"Make a Choice"	Moe Sasaki	Kazuhiko Inukai	Moe Sasaki	January 16, 2023
As Finn and the car salesman hold each other at gunpoint, Vijay suddenly speeds onto the scene at his own car and uses his own card's power to tangle Finn in vines. Finn later finds himself waking up in the back room of the Pinochle car dealership on Old Maid Street. The salesman from before, Chris Redgrave, is about to kill Finn when Bernard receives a call from the Pinochle President and decides to give Finn a chance to prove himself. After being introduced to the other members of the dealership working with High Card, Finn is soon hired as an apprentice car seller and assigned to work under Chris. The next morning, Finn is quickly thrown into his first assignment when a bulletproof monster is robbing an armored truck. Chris and Finn confront the man, but quickly find their powers are useless against "Rockin Rock", the power of the 3 of Hearts. Chris baits the attacker into attacking him through the windshield of his car, and drives them both into the river. The attacker releases his card's power before he drowns, while Finn uses his own focus to fire a few shots through the car's window allowing Chris to escape the sunken car. Afterwards, the President tells Bernard that Finn will be fired if he doesn't continue showing results, while the other High Card members mock Finn for having a weak card.
3	3	"Crazy Rich"	Arata Mita	Shingo Nagai	Arata Mita	January 23, 2023
Finn rushes to the rescue of a rich boy being kidnapped in broad daylight by two men named Jake and Carter. The two men blame the boy's father for closing down their factory and leaving them poor, but the boy claims not to know how to contact his father for their ransom demand. After rushing into a Chinese restaurant, local police arrive and arrest all four of them. Finn and the boy walk out of the police station, and the other two are broken out of their cell by their sister, Nix. Finn tries to appeal to the rich boy by buying him a hot dog and taking him on a ride on the Shield Underground, but the two of them are taken prisoner by Nix who wields the 7 of Clubs power, "Lethal Scoville", able to create flames of different size and power. While the kidnappers are busy praying to their fire god, Finn uses a key he stole from Jake to unlock their handcuffs, and uses his Nambu to bury the brothers under a pile of scrap metal. However, Nix is able to melt Finn's bullets before they reach her. Suddenly, Chris arrives on the scene and tosses a suitcase filled with a million dollars in cash at the boy. The boy turns out to be another High Card member named Leo, and he uses his 7 of Diamonds power, "Never No Dollars", to swap most of the cash for a bazooka that punches through the flame and takes out Nix. However, the explosion also knocks over the giant scrap metal idol, with Finn saving Leo before he is crushed under it with Nix. The next day, Finn discovers that Leo is actually the son of the Pinochle President and the head of their Old Maid office. Leo later delivers Nix's card to Owen, as his father ignores him while leaving the room.
4	4	"Samurai Girl"	Noriyuki Nomata	Kenichi Yamashita	Moe Sasaki	January 30, 2023
Finn swipes a client from Chris at the Pinochle dealership as Wendy arrives late to work. The following night at the Crazy Eights bar, Chris tells Finn about unwritten rules of their job, which include never letting Wendy get too drunk, or draw her sword. The next day, Wendy remembers the words of her late father and manages to arrive on time. However, Chris finds himself taken hostage in a bank robbery. Wendy decides to rush to the scene as the others follow on their own. Chris gets gunned down trying to shield a couple escaping hostages, but revives with his card's power. Vijay manages to trap the thieves' escape van and Wendy uses her card, the Ace of Spades, and summons "Love and Peace." She manages to knock out the thieves with her sheathed sword, but one of the thieves takes Vijay at knifepoint and reveals himself as another Player: John Doe, with the 4 of Hearts power "Agent S", allowing him to split himself up to four extra bodies at once. Feeling trapped by the clones and the words of her father, Wendy unsheathes the sword and lets the spirit of Love and Peace take over. Love-P easily defeats John Doe, but then starts attacking the other High Card members before Finn manages to knock the sword out of her hands, causing Love-P to sleep again.
5	5	"Power Game"	Arata Mita	Kazuhiko Inukai	Arata Mita	February 6, 2023
Junior Detective Sugar Peace grows increasingly suspicious of how multiple cases have been closed at the Shield Police Department, and how all Persons of Interest connected to Pinochle are mysteriously let go without any follow-up. John Doe promises to turn state's evidence against the Klondike family if he is given witness protection. Sugar hands John off to another detective while she begins to stake out the Pinochle dealership and the people who work there, but can't get any leads. A few nights later, veteran detective Greg Young attends a charity event held by Ban Klondike, and Sugar arrests Finn for pointing a gun at her. Greg watches Ban unveil a captive John Doe, and slowly snaps his neck in front of the assembled crowd without touching him. Meanwhile, a woman from the Klondike family crushes Sugar's police car under a bus using some telekinetic power, and nearly makes Finn shoot Sugar, but aims away at the last second, claiming that this was a warning. As the rain stops, Finn warns Sugar not to continue the investigation. Greg tries to find out from Ban what happened to the X-Playing cards over the past month, and Ban only tells him about "X-Blind." The next day, Sugar claims she can't let her investigation go, while Greg informs her of John Doe's death.
6	6	"Take Back Five"	Tomohiro Matsukawa	Shingo Nagai	Tomohiro Matsukawa	February 13, 2023
A man tells the legend of the land of Trapla, the predecessor to Fourland, locked in war until a mage presented a band of 52 knights with a magic card, which they each used to swear a blood oath to a boy the mage called their True King. Though the knights died in battle, the powers of their cards remained, and the boy used the cards to expel the barbarians from Trapla, allowing him to become the first King of Fourland. The story is told by an auctioneer on a cruise ship as he reveals the auction about to take place, where the main attraction is the X-Playing Card 5 of Diamonds, though the man is unaware of its true power. The CEO of "Who's Who", Norman Kingstat, and his two secretaries have arrived to win the card at the auction. Meanwhile, the members of High Card launch a heist to swap the magical 5 of Diamonds with a fake card. The plan manages to go well at first, until one of Norman's secretaries, Blist, uses his Million Volt power to attack Chris before he can make the switch. As Norman and Leo get involved in a bidding war, the card finally arrives onstage, but Finn's seasickness ruins Leo's chance. However, the card is stolen anyway by the telekinetic woman from Klondike, who escapes in a helicopter.
7	7	"Love & Fake"	Yōhei Fukui	Kazuhiko Inukai	Hideki Okamoto	February 20, 2023
Finn and Chris attempt to take the 2 of Diamonds from a girl named Chelsea, but she uses its power on them instead. The "Love Connection" ability forces Finn and Chris to stick their hands together and they can't remove them, so they chase Chelsea all around Shield to make her remove the power, but she refuses to release the connection until she finds her soulmate, and won't fall for Chris's words. Back at Finn's room, Finn has a nightmare about being attacked by a knight in black armor. The next morning, Chris takes Finn along to his "date", which turns out to be spending time with his younger sister Michel. Michel thinks that Finn and Chris are a couple from their hands, but Finn plays along. When they stop at a nearby cafe, the two accidentally meet Chelsea again, working there part-time. Michel asks Chelsea to come with them, and Chelsea plays along to expose Chris's facade. However, she ends up enjoying her time with Michel. Michel suddenly collapses in the street, and Chelsea releases the card's power so Chris can rush her to the hospital. At the hospital, Chris finds out that Michel was actually in hospice care, but snuck out of the hospital to visit her brother one last time. Chelsea promises to give her card to Chris when she finds her soulmate. The next night, Chris and Finn find out Chelsea has become a waitress at their Crazy Eights bar.
8	8	"Heat Up"	Ippei Ichii	Kenichi Yamashita	Yoshio Suzuki; Hatsuki Tsuji	February 27, 2023
Finn returns to the Sun Fields orphanage for Lindsey's birthday. However, Lindsey privately tells Finn during the birthday party that the orphanage is slated to close in the Spring. Finn tells Lindsey that he can save the orphanage with money from his new job, but Lindsey is suspicious of how he earned so much money in a short time, and turns him down. Suddenly, Bobby Ball appears at the party, looking for revenge at Finn. Lindsey gets the orphans out while Bobby Ball sets the building on fire and Finn is forced to cover one of the boys while Bobby flings powerful marbles at Finn. Finn gets the boy off the roof with the other orphans' help, then manages to strike Bobby. Bobby reveals he now has 2 X-Playing cards, and uses "X-Hand" to combine the powers of the 3 of Diamonds and 3 of Spades, turning himself into a monster with extendable marble limbs that regenerates damage from Finn's bullets while mocking him for his family dying in a fire. Bobby is suddenly struck by a small missile from out of nowhere that explodes his whole body. After the attack, Finn realizes the nightmares he had about being attacked by a black knight in a flaming house were actually repressed memories, and wonders if Lindsey was in on the lie.
9	9	"By Your Side"	Hidetoshi Watanabe; Zhuzhou Wonzhao; John Smith	Shingo Nagai	Hatsuki Tsuji	March 6, 2023
An explosion rocks the capital of Spada as the Klondike family murders Dylan, the Crown Prince of Fourland, in the confusion. After speaking with the King and then Ban about the cards, Theodore orders High Card to immediately collect all known X-Playing Cards, so Bernard makes travel arrangements for the group to head to different states of Fourland. However, Finn has locked himself in his room for two weeks after the events at Sun Fields, so Chris tries to persuade him to join him on the mission to Polostick. Finn is not interested at first, but later decides to join Chris to take his mind off recent events. Meanwhile, two members of the Klondike family are tipped off to Chris and Finn's mission. Jasper Libera boards the train and uses his 2 of Clubs power, "Metallical Parade", to threaten Chris and Finn, boasting about a mole in High Card and his plan to take their cards. His partner Alex will use his own card's power to drop a large rock on the rails and crush everyone on board. However, Chris responds that Jasper would also die in that scenario, and says that he doesn't care if he kills Finn either, because Chris would gain both their cards after reviving with Calories High. In desperation, Jasper rips off the train car's roof and swings a metal chain-sickle at Finn. Chris kicks Finn off the train into the river below, then gets Jasper to stop the train by holding him off the side. Jasper then wraps a metal chain around Chris's leg. Meanwhile, an unconscious Finn is found by a dark-skinned woman and her dog.
10	10	"To Be Apart"	Masaki Kitamura	Kazuhiko Inukai	Yui Umemoto	March 13, 2023
Finn wakes up in a cabin to find that Arya saved him. Meanwhile, Jasper tortures Chris for the location of his card after noticing that he wasn't using Calories High to heal his injuries, Alex tries to find Finn and his card, and the other High Card members are forced to remain on standby after completing their own missions. Arya tells Finn that she used to be a member of High Card herself, working under Theodore with Chris's father, Tyler and other agents. However, Arya grew upset with Theodore's callousness, and one day Arya went against Theodore's orders to help Tyler use an X-Hand with all the 5 cards to save Chris's life, but the strain of doing so cost him his own. After that day, Arya left High Card and drifted around Fourland before settling down in a remote cabin in the mountains. Soon after telling the story, Arya hands her card, the Jack of Clubs, to Finn, but suddenly the two of them are attacked by Alex, who seeks to take both their cards. Arya gets her card back and uses its power, "Coming Home", to attract several large objects towards her and crush Alex, but Alex uses his own "G Round" power to block the attacks. Suddenly, Chris arrives on the scene, having escaped Jasper, and helps Finn and Arya defeat Alex. However, after taking the 5 of Clubs from Alex, Chris shoots Finn, saying he didn't want him to find out about his past.
11	11	"Chris"	Masaru Kanamori	Kenichi Yamashita	Hitomi Ezoe	March 20, 2023
Chris reflects on his past and how Finn reminds him of a younger version of himself. Meanwhile, Finn wakes up in the Pinochle office, where he finds out that Chris shot him in the pocket where he kept his indestructible X-Playing Card, saving his life. Finn is ordered to stand by while the other members of High Card directly guard the Royal Family from the Klondikes. Chris uses Chelsea as a go-between to collect his equipment, but is attacked by police as Theodore has put out an order to shoot Chris on sight. Meanwhile, Ban rallies a group of heavily-armed terrorists to attack the Fourland palace, and sends Nhat to help Chris escape from the police. Back at the Pinochle office, Lindsey pays a visit to Finn and shows that Chris sent him a money order to rebuild the orphanage. Finn soon realizes that Chris saw him as family, and puts together his true motives, rushing to the hospital after Chris has absconded with Michel. Finn begs Chris via phone not to sacrifice his own life for Michel, but Chris speeds out of the hospital and survives a sniper shot from Owen with his Calories High power. Owen then tells Finn he's fired for disobeying Theodore's orders.
12	12	"Finn"	Shinichiro Kimura; Yōhei Fukui	Shingo Nagai	Junichi Wada	March 27, 2023
Klondike's terrorists storm the palace in waves as the members of High Card continue their defensive battle. Meanwhile, a couple of Pinochle men knock out Finn to keep him from interfering with hunting down Chris. Sugar rushes to the hospital as Owen's men are carrying Finn out, and Finn uses the distraction to hijack her car, which happens to have Chelsea in the backseat. Meanwhile, Ban uses his own card's power to completely wipe out a police checkpoint stalling Chris, telling him the cards deserve to be used for their own sake. Finn and Chelsea deduce that Chris is taking Michel to the ferris wheel from their last date, but Nhat wrecks their car and forces them to flee. Chelsea gets wounded while escaping with Finn, but Wendy arrives, possessed by Love-P, to fight Nhat in his place. With help from Sugar and Greg providing a distraction, Love-P scores a major hit on Nhat, before Greg knocks Love-P out with some falling debris. Chris finally takes Michel to the ferris wheel and begins playing the X-Hand of all 5s to trade his life for hers. Finn gets a ride from Bernard, and Leo uses his Never No Dollars power to build a bridge directly to the wheel, but runs out of money before they can reach it, forcing Finn to use his Neo New Nambu to fire a shot all the way through the window of Chris's car and knock one of the cards out of his X-Hand. Three days later, martial law has been lifted from Shield, Chris finds out that the three-card X-Hand was able to partially heal his sister at the expense of half of his life, rather than all of it. Both Finn and Chris are re-hired at Pinochle, but Chris is demoted under Finn as punishment. Elsewhere, Nhat is impaled on the sword of a black knight.

==== Season 2 (2024) ====
No. overall	No. in season	Title	Directed by	Written by	Storyboarded by	Original release date
13	1	"Knightmare"	Unknown	Unknown	TBA	January 8, 2024
14	2	"Truth of the Hero"	Unknown	Unknown	TBA	January 15, 2024
15	3	"Answer the Door"	Unknown	Unknown	TBA	January 22, 2024
16	4	"Once Upon a Time"	Unknown	Unknown	TBA	January 29, 2024
17	5	"Look at Me"	Unknown	Unknown	TBA	February 5, 2024
18	6	"Hold Your Hand"	Unknown	Unknown	TBA	February 12, 2024
19	7	"Prisoners"	Unknown	Unknown	TBA	February 19, 2024
20	8	"Lala Valdenklein"	Unknown	Unknown	TBA	February 26, 2024
21	9	"Coming Day"	Unknown	Unknown	TBA	March 4, 2024
22	10	"Winner or Loser"	Unknown	Unknown	TBA	March 11, 2024
23	11	"Sweet Home"	Unknown	Unknown	TBA	March 18, 2024
24	12	"Last Shot"	Unknown	Unknown	TBA	March 25, 2024
25 (ONA)	13	"The Flowers Bloom"	Unknown	Unknown	TBA	November 5, 2024

=== Print ===
A manga and novel adaptation of the franchise have been announced. The side story manga, titled High Card -♢9 No Mercy, began serialization in Square Enix's online manga magazine Manga Up! on August 31, 2022. The manga's chapters have been collected into two tankōbon volumes as of July 5, 2024. The manga is set to end with the release of its third volume.

No.	Japanese release date	Japanese ISBN
1	July 18, 2023	978-4-7575-8337-5
2	January 6, 2024	978-4-7575-8994-0
3	July 5, 2024	978-4-7575-9282-7

=== Drama CD ===
A drama CD adaptation of the franchise was released on December 3, 2021.

== See also ==
- Kawagoe Boys Sing, the original character designs of which is also provided by Ebimo
