= Build Divide =

Japanese media franchise

- Key visual of Build Divide Code Black

ビルディバイド (Birudibaido)
- Created by: Homura Kawamoto; Hikaru Muno
- Anime television series

Build Divide -#00000 (Code Black)-
- Directed by: Yuki Komada
- Produced by: Nobuhiro Nakayama
- Written by: Yoriko Tomita
- Music by: Keiji Inai; Kenta Higashiohji
- Studio: Liden Films
- Licensed by: NA: Aniplex of America; SEA: Medialink
- Original network: Tokyo MX, GTV, GYT, BS11, TeNY, MBS, AT-X, FBS, TV Shizuoka, STV, Chukyo TV, RSK, RCC, Miyatere
- Original run: October 10, 2021 – December 26, 2021
- Episodes: 12
- Anime television series

Build Divide -#FFFFFF (Code White)-
- Directed by: Yuki Komada
- Produced by: Nobuhiro Nakayama
- Written by: Yoriko Tomita
- Music by: Keiji Inai; Kenta Higashiohji
- Studio: Liden Films
- Licensed by: NA: Aniplex of America; SEA: Medialink
- Original network: Tokyo MX, GTV, GYT, BS11, TeNY, MBS, AT-X, FBS, TV Shizuoka, STV, Chukyo TV, RSK, RCC, Miyatere
- Original run: April 3, 2022 – June 26, 2022
- Episodes: 12

Build Divide (ビルディバイド, Birudibaido) is a Japanese mixed-media project created by Homura Kawamoto and Hikaru Muno. It consisted of a collectible card game which debuted in October 2021, and an anime television series by Liden Films aired in the same month and ended in June 2022. The anime series is licensed in North America by Aniplex of America and Southeast Asia by Medialink.

== Characters ==
Teruto Kurabe (蔵部照人, Teruhito Kurabe)
Voiced by: Yūto Uemura
Kikka (キッカ, Kikka)
Voiced by: Yu Serizawa
Hiyori Tori (棟梨ひより, Tori Hiyori)
Voiced by: Aoi Koga
Sakura Banka (晩華桜良, Banka Sakura)
Voiced by: Sayumi Watabe
Naomitsu Enjō (円城直光, Enjō Naomitsu)
Voiced by: Atsushi Tamaru

== Media ==
=== Card game ===
The game's two starting decks and first booster pack was released on October 8, 2021.

=== Anime ===
The anime television series is produced by Liden Films and directed by Yuki Komada, with Yoriko Tomita writing the series' scripts, Shinpei Tomooka designing the characters, and Keiji Inai with Kenta Higashiohji composing the series' music. The first cour, titled Build Divide -#000000 (Code Black)-, aired from October 10 to December 26, 2021. Egoist performed the first opening theme "BANG!!!", while Memai Siren performed the first ending theme "Fukagyakuteki na Inochi no Shōzō". The second cour, titled Build Divide -#FFFFFF (Code White)-, aired from April 3 to June 26, 2022. Egoist performed the second opening theme "Gold", while Who-ya Extended performed the second ending theme "A Shout Of Triumph".

==== English release ====
The series is licensed in North America by Aniplex of America and streamed on the Crunchyroll and Funimation video on demand services worldwide.

In Southeast Asia, Medialink licensed the series and was streamed on iQIYI and Bilibili.

==== Episode list ====
===== BUILD-DIVIDE -#000000- CODE BLACK =====
No. overall	No. in season	Title	Directed by	Written by	Storyboarded by	Original release date
1	1	"When You Wish Upon a Star"; Transliteration: "Hoshi ni Negai o" (Japanese: 星に願いを)	Daishi Katō	Yoriko Tomita	Yuki Komada	October 10, 2021
2	2	"Lonely Baby Bird"; Transliteration: "Hitoribotchi no Hinadori" (Japanese: ひとりぼっちのひなどり)	Daiki Handa	Sei Tsuguta	Masayoshi Nishida, Yuki Komada	October 17, 2021
3	3	"Fiery Feelings"; Transliteration: "Ka-keru Omoi" (Japanese: か-ける思い)	Yasuto Nishikata	Dai Masuyama	Yasuto Nishikata	October 24, 2021
4	4	"Flower and Storm"; Transliteration: "Hana ni Arashi" (Japanese: 花に嵐)	Kana Kawana	Yoriko Tomita	Jun'ichi Sakata	October 31, 2021
5	5	"Cake and Fishhook"; Transliteration: "Kēki to Tsuribari" (Japanese: ケーキと釣り針)	Masahiko Watanabe	Sei Tsuguta	Katsumi Terahigashi	November 7, 2021
6	6	"Path of Light"; Transliteration: "Hikari no Michi" (Japanese: 光の道)	Hanabi Fuyutsuki	Dai Masuyama	Masayoshi Nishida, Yuki Komada	November 14, 2021
7	7	"Ah! Vous dirai-je, Mer"	Daiki Handa	Sei Tsuguta	Daiki Handa	November 21, 2021
8	8	"Buried Memories"; Transliteration: "Umerareta Tsuioku" (Japanese: 埋められた追憶)	Yasushi Tomoda	Dai Masuyama, Yoriko Tomita	Ryūhei Aoyagi	November 28, 2021
9	9	"Reach for the Stars"; Transliteration: "Hoshi o Tsukamu Hito" (Japanese: 星を掴む人)	Hideki Takayama	Seiko Takagi	Yasushi Muroya, Yuki Komada	December 5, 2021
10	10	"A Wish"; Transliteration: "Negaigoto" (Japanese: 願い事)	Daishi Katō	Seiko Takagi	Daishi Katō, Yuki Komada	December 12, 2021
11	11	"Heads or Tails"; Transliteration: "Ura to Omote" (Japanese: 裏と表)	Masahiko Watanabe	Yoriko Tomita	Shinji Itadaki	December 19, 2021
12	12	"End of the Road"; Transliteration: "Michi no Hate" (Japanese: 道の果て)	Kōji Aritomi	Yoriko Tomita	Shinji Itadaki	December 26, 2021

===== BUILD-DIVIDE -#FFFFFF- CODE WHITE =====
No. overall	No. in season	Title	Directed by	Written by	Storyboarded by	Original release date
13	1	"No Rain, No Rainbow"	Yasushi Tomoda	Sei Tsuguta, Yoriko Tomita	Shinji Itadaki	April 3, 2022
14	2	"Intersection"; Transliteration: "Kōsaten" (Japanese: 交差点)	Masahiko Watanabe	Seiko Takagi	Masao Suzuki	April 10, 2022
15	3	"Flowers and Birds"; Transliteration: "Hana to Tori" (Japanese: 花と鳥)	Sōta Yokote	Yoriko Tomita	Sōta Yokote	April 17, 2022
16	4	"To the Other Me"; Transliteration: "Mō Hitori no Watashi e" (Japanese: もう一人の私へ)	Fumio Maezono	Dai Masuyama, Yoriko Tomita	Shinji Itadaki	April 24, 2022
17	5	"Kizuna"; Transliteration: "Kizuna" (Japanese: 絆)	Kōji Aritomi	Dai Masuyama, Yoriko Tomita	Shinji Itadaki	May 1, 2022
18	6	"On the Starry Sky"; Transliteration: "Hoshizora no Ue de" (Japanese: 星空の上で)	Daiki Handa	Sei Tsuguta	Shinji Itadaki	May 15, 2022
19	7	"The Visitor"; Transliteration: "Raihōsha" (Japanese: 来訪者)	Masahiko Watanabe	Seiko Takagi	Susumu Nishizawa, Yuki Komada	May 22, 2022
20	8	"Cracked World"; Transliteration: "Wareru Sekai" (Japanese: 割れる世界)	Yasushi Tomoda	Dai Masuyama	Yasushi Tomoda	May 29, 2022
21	9	"Live in the Now, Now, Now!"; Transliteration: "Zengo Saidan" (Japanese: 前後際断)	Michiru Itabisashi	Seiko Takagi, Yoriko Tomita	Kenji Kuroda	June 5, 2022
22	10	"Choice"; Transliteration: "Sentaku" (Japanese: 選択)	Minami Honma	Sei Tsuguta, Yasuto Nishikata	Yasuto Nishikata	June 12, 2022
23	11	"Unlimited Wishes"; Transliteration: "Mukyū no Negai" (Japanese: 無窮の願い)	Kōji Aritomi	Yoriko Tomita	Masao Suzuki	June 19, 2022
24	12	"No One Knows When Spring Ends"; Transliteration: "Haru no Tomari o Shiru Hito zo Naki" (Japanese: 春のとまりを知る人ぞなき)	Yasushi Tomoda, Yuki Komada	Yoriko Tomita	Masao Suzuki, Ken Tsubuki, Yuki Komada	June 26, 2022
