= The War of Greedy Witches =

Japanese manga series

- First tankōbon volume cover, featuring Tomoe Gozen (left) and Elizabeth Báthory (right)

魔女大戦 32人の異才の魔女は殺し合う (Majo Taisen: 32-nin no Isai no Majo wa Koroshiau)
- Genre: Action; Dark fantasy
- Manga
- Written by: Homura Kawamoto
- Illustrated by: Makoto Shiozuka
- Published by: Coamix
- English publisher: NA: MangaHot (digital); Yen Press
- Imprint: Zenon Comics
- Magazine: Monthly Comic Zenon
- Original run: October 24, 2020 – present
- Volumes: 16
- icon

The War of Greedy Witches (Japanese: 魔女大戦 32人の異才の魔女は殺し合う, Hepburn: Majo Taisen: 32-nin no Isai no Majo wa Koroshiau) is a Japanese manga series written by Homura Kawamoto and illustrated by Makoto Shiozuka. It has been serialized in Coamix's Monthly Comic Zenon since October 2020.

== Plot ==
Just as Jeanne d'Arc is tried for heresy and burned at the stake, she is rescued by the demons Lilith and Lilum and taken to the court of the demon queen Agrat bat Mahlat. 31 other famous women from across history were similarly rescued from the time of their deaths, restored to their physical prime if they were old or ill, and gathered. Agrat calls them Witches and explains that they can all manifest magical abilities by focusing on their greed, desires, and regrets. She commands them to enter a tournament called Walpurgis to take turns fighting to the death in an arena for her amusement and offers to grant a wish to the sole survivor, but warns that if they die, their soul will cease to exist. The audience of the arena is made of both demons and people from their lives, who gamble on the matches' outcomes for the merit to be reborn. Jeanne had blindly followed orders her whole life and never wanted anything before, so she struggles to understand what her desire is.

== Characters ==
=== Witches ===
A group of thirty two women that have been selected by Agrat Bat Mahlat to participate in Walpurgis and go against each other in order to fulfill their greatest desire. Since the spectators gamble on the outcomes, their odds of winning have been calculated.

Jeanne d'Arc (ジャンヌ・ダルク, Jannu Daruku)
A female knight from France and one of the Witches invited to participate in the Walpurgis. Her title is "Nothing/Naught Witch" and her desire is "Abnegation". Her odds of winning were calculated to be 1065:1. Originally wielding an ordinary sword which broke in her fight with Wu Zetian, her weapons are two cross-shaped bladed shields that can be ignited. Her magic increases her power by resonating with her opponent's desire and she can detect presences by reading people's desire. She kills Wu Zetian in the second match. She eventually forms an alliance with Himiko where they will somehow help each other survive. Agatha Christie suspects she is the key to Walpurgis.
Tomoe Gozen (巴御前, Tomoe Gozen)
A Witch invited to the Walpurgis. Her title is "Mighty/Power Witch" and her desire is "Justice". Her odds of winning were calculated to be 22.7:1. She was an onna-musha from the late Heian period of Japanese history, serving under Minamoto no Yoshinaka during the Genpei War and was a part of the conflict that led to the first shogunate. Her weapons are a massive naginata and bow. Her magic lets her increase the destructive power of her attacks and reshape her weapons to make them stronger. She kills Elizabeth Báthory in the first match.
Elizabeth Báthory (エリザベート・バートリー, Erizabēto Bātorī)
One of the Witches invited to participate in the Walpurgis. Her title is "Blood Witch" and her desire is to "Torment". Her odds of winning were calculated to be 66.1:1. Elizabeth is a noblewoman and serial killer, sometimes being referred to as a "real-life vampire", due to the belief that she drank and bathed in the blood of her victims. Her weapon is a polearm with a spiked collar on the end. Her magic allows her to conjure up and telekinetically control torture devices. She is killed by Tomoe Gozen in the first match.
Wu Zetian (武則天, Busokuten)
A Witch invited to the Walpurgis and the first female emperor of China. Her title is "Supremacy/Dominion Witch" and her desire is the "Heavens". Her odds of winning were calculated to be 5.2:1. Her weapon is a spear with a stone bludgeon attached to the other end. Her magic allows her to control wind. When her match started, she arrogantly told Jeanne to kill herself and save her the trouble, and though Jeanne briefly considered obeying, she refused. She is killed by Jeanne d'Arc in the second match.
Cleopatra (クレオパトラ, Kureopatora)
Queen of Egypt and one of the Witches invited to participate in the Walpurgis. Her title is "Love Witch" and her desire was for "True Love". Her odds of winning were calculated to be 1.8:1. Her weapon is a khopesh. Her magic allows her wishes to come true, but it only works on herself or people or objects she is in physical contact with and she must verbally state her wish. She is killed by Himiko in the third match.
Himiko (卑弥呼)
One of the Witches invited to participate in the Walpurgis. Her title is "Demon Witch" and her desire is "Attention". Her odds of winning were calculated to be 6:1. Her former name was Yogi and she took the title of "Himiko" after murdering the original priestess out of revenge for the death of her parents. Her weapons are daggers, clawed gauntlets, clawed boots, and a horn on her head that can be launched. Her magic allows her to manifest her lies into reality, but it doesn't work if her victim sees through the lie. She kills Cleopatra in the third match. She eventually forms an alliance with Jeanne where they will somehow help each other survive.
Mata Hari (マタ・ハリ)
One of the Witches invited to the Walpurgis. Her title is "Secret Witch" and her desire is currently unknown. Her odds of winning were calculated to be 51.4:1. She is the leader of a group called The Witch's Hammer which plans to somehow usurp the Walpurgis and Agrat. Her weapon is a rope dart which she was able to kill Mary Read with in the fourth match without revealing what her magic was. After the fifth match, she invited Himiko to join The Witch's Hammer, but was refused.
Mary Read (メアリ・リード, Meari Rīdo)
A British pirate and one of the Witches invited to participate in the Walpurgis. Her title is "Sea Witch" and her desire is the "Oceans". Her odds of winning were calculated to be 135.2:1. After being betrayed by Anne Bonny, she constantly hallucinates that Anne is still by her side. Her weapons are two anchors attached to chains. Her magic allows her to convert the battlefield to an ocean, summon her ship, and control its loaded cannons. She is killed by Mata Hari in the fourth match.
Marie Antoinette (マリー・アントワネット, Marī Antowanetto)
The Queen of France and a Witch invited to the Walpurgis. Her title is "Pure Witch" and her desire is to "Control". Her odds of winning were calculated to be 35.9:1. She was a fan of Jeanne d'Arc. Her weapon is a massive scythe. Her magic lets her control her shadow and conjure from it copies of things she had feared like guillotines, hammers, and dogs. She is killed by Catherine the Great in the fifth match.
Catherine the Great (エカチェリーナII世, Ekacherīna Ni-sei)
An empress from Russia and one of the Witches invited to participate in the Walpurgis. Her title is "Will Witch" and her desire is to "Subjugate". Her odds of winning were calculated to be 11.7:1. Her magic allows her to switch between different modes to adapt to the situation. One mode is armed with a sword and enhances her speed, one mode is armed with a shotgun and enhances her vision, and one mode wears horseshoe-shaped gauntlets and boots and enhances her strength. She kills Marie Antoinette in the fifth match. While waiting for her next match, she befriends her opponent, Huang Yueying, and spends most of her time chatting and eating.
Marie Curie (マリ ･ キュリー, Mari Kyurī)
One of the Witches invited to participate in the Walpurgis. Her title is "Reason Witch" and her desire is to seek the "Truth". Her odds of winning were calculated to be 57.7:1. Before her match, she befriended her opponent, Huang Yueying, for being a fellow intellectual. Her weapons are two pistols with bayonets. Her magic allows her to predict the future by analyzing different possibilities. She is killed by Huang Yueying in the sixth match.
Huang Yueying (黄月英, Kōgetsuei)
The wife of Zhuge Liang from the Three Kingdoms, and one of the Witches invited to participate in the Walpurgis. Her title is "Knowledge Witch" and her desire is to gain more "Knowledge". Her odds of winning were calculated to be 210.7:1. Before her match, she befriended her opponent, Marie Curie, for being a fellow intellectual. Her weapons are two swords and a suit of high tech armor. Her magic allows her to disassemble the armor and telekinetically control each piece and weapon. She kills Marie Curie in the sixth match. While waiting for her next match, she befriends her opponent, Catherine the Great, and spends most of her time chatting and eating.
Yaoya Oshichi (八百屋お七,)
One of the Witches invited to participate in the Walpurgis. Her title is "Flame Witch" and her desire is "Passion". Her odds of winning were calculated to be 601.5:1. She is a member of The Witch's Hammer. Her weapon is a Matoi. Her magic allows her to control flames. She kills Orihime in the seventh match.
Orihime (織姫)
One of the Witches invited to participate in the Walpurgis. Her title is "Star Witch" and her desire is "Love". Her odds of winning were calculated to be 401.1:1. She is not the legendary Orihime from the folk tale Tanabata, but instead a regular modern-day idol singer who's using the name and tale as a gimmick, with her true name unrevealed. She is psychotic and kidnapped 104 men, intending to make it 365 in a grim parody of Tanabata before being arrested. Her weapon is a massive chakram. Her magic allows her to surround the battlefield with a starry sky, with floating rocks as the stars, and to manipulate gravity for herself and whatever she touches. She is killed by Yaoya Oshichi in the seventh match.
Bonnie Parker (ボニー・パーカー)
One of the Witches invited to participate in the Walpurgis. Her title is "Robbery Witch" and her desire is to "Usurp". Her odds of winning were calculated to be 91.5:1. In the 20th century, she and her husband Clyde Barrow were known for being one of the greatest thieves, fugitives and robbers in the United States. She turned to crime after her friend Talissa was murdered by a corrupt official. Her weapons are pistols, Tommy guns, and a crate full of weapons. Her magic conjures a phantasmal hand that can steal items from locked rooms and call them to her hands, enhancing them in the process, which she can use to retrieve the weapons in the crate. She kills Mona Lisa in the eighth match.
Mona Lisa (モナ・リザ)
One of the Witches invited to participate in the Walpurgis. Her title is "Painting Witch" and her desire is "Immortalization". Her odds of winning were calculated to be 303.5:1. She is the woman depicted in Leonardo da Vinci's painting of the same name, and has the peculiarity of having different faces depending on the person who sees her; Bonnie sees her as ugly. She claims da Vinci's painting depicts her true appearance. Her weapon is a kitchen knife. Her magic lets her conjure illusions that are more effective and feel solid the more the victim believes they are real, but only her target can see these illusions. She is killed by Bonnie Parker in the eighth match. Before she dies, she whispers her true name into Bonnie's ear, who commented it was a beautiful name.
Agatha Christie (アガサ・クリスティ)
One of the Witches invited to participate in the Walpurgis. Her title is "Mystery Witch" and her desire is "To Solve Mysteries". Her odds of winning were calculated to be 30.5:1. Seemingly murdered before the ninth match, it is revealed that she faked her own death in order to investigate the motivations behind the Walpurgis, enlisting the demon servant assigned to guard her, Lilia, to help in her investigations. Her weapon is a cane. Her magic allows her to create doors that lead to different locations and to manipulate the environment inside a locked room.
Isabeau Cheyne (イザボー・シェイネ)
One of the Witches invited to participate in the Walpurgis. Her title is "Evil Witch" and her desire is currently unknown. Her odds of winning were calculated to be 252.1:1. Her powers and abilities have yet to be revealed as she did not fight against Agatha Christie in the ninth match, but won by default after her opponent seemed to have been murdered. She is revealed to be a chūnibyō, claiming that her ordinary eyepatch and bandages seal her powers and obsessed with looking cool.
Anna Pavlova (アンナ・パヴロワ)
One of the Witches invited to participate in the Walpurgis. Her title is "Dance Witch" and her desire is "Improvement". Her odds of winning were calculated to be 85.9:1. Her weapons are metal ballet shoes. Her magic lets her turn the battlefield to nighttime with a full moon, emulating the setting of The Dying Swan, then make her victims experience any pain and injuries she feels when she captivates them with her dancing, which affects people in the audience as well, although there is a slight delay in this effect, allowing her to be killed without affecting the killer. She is killed by Yim Wing-chun in the tenth match.
Yim Wing-chun (嚴詠春, Gen'eishun)
One of the Witches invited to participate in the Walpurgis. Her title is "Martial Arts Witch" and her desire is "To Be Stronger". Her odds of winning were calculated to be 86.5:1. She is a member of The Witch's Hammer. Her weapons are metal gauntlets. She claims to not know how to use magic and is uninterested in it as she prefers to fight using only Wing Chun, though Agrat notices that magic enhances her blows. She kills Anna Pavlova in the tenth match.
Lakshmibai (ラクシュミーバイ)
One of the Witches invited to participate in the Walpurgis. Her title is "Revolutionary Witch" and her desire is "Self-Judgment". Her odds of winning were calculated to be 90.5:1. Before the eleventh match, she asks the surviving Witches to stop killing each other and rebel against Agrat, but everyone ignores her plea. Her weapon is a rifle with a bayonet. Her magic summons a genie-like being that by spending coins that represent her karma, cause good luck to happen to her and bad luck to happen to her opponent. In the eleventh match, Sasaki Rui defeats her but spares her life, causing Agrat to angrily attack her while reminding the Witches that the fights are to the death. Agrat traps her in a dungeon, then revealing that only a Witch can kill a Witch, starts torturing her to try to make her kill herself. She was secretly saved by Agatha, who fakes her death, and helps her in her investigation.
Sasaki Rui (佐々木累)
One of the Witches invited to participate in the Walpurgis. Her title is "Sword Witch" and her desire is "Connection". Her odds of winning were calculated to be 47.8:1. She hides behind a mask and becomes furious when seen without it, yet dreams of finding someone to marry. Her weapons are a katana and wakizashi. Her magic enhances her senses enough to read will and respond to attacks without looking. When men in the crowd say they love her, this makes her power evolve into reading the will of everything around her, essentially eliminating her blind spots. In the eleventh match, she defeats Lakshmibai but spares her life. Agrat angrily takes Lakshmibai to a dungeon, but she is nonetheless declared the winner.
Lyudmila Pavlichenko (リュドミラ・パブリチェンコ)
One of the Witches invited to participate in the Walpurgis. Her title is "Sniper Witch" and her desire is "Peace". Her odds of winning were calculated to be 3.5:1. She is haunted by the deaths of her comrades on the battlefield so she wants an end to all wars. Her weapon is a sniper rifle with explosive rounds. Her magic transports herself and her opponent to a pocket dimension with an urban environment, giving her plenty of hiding places and positions to snipe from. She kills Murasaki Shikibu in the twelfth match.
Murasaki Shikibu (紫式部)
One of the Witches invited to participate in the Walpurgis. Herr title is "Literary Witch" and her desire is "Expression". Her odds of winning were calculated to be 116.3:1. She acts like an unhinged stalker towards Lyudmila. Her weapons are a scroll and brush that can enlarge and block bullets and explosions. Her magic allows her to create duplicates of characters she writes about, while she turns into a hairpin the duplicate wears. For example, by writing about Lyudmila, she creates a duplicate of her with her powers and memories. The duplicate has free will, and though she obeys Murasaki's orders to kill the original, she often argues with Murasaki. A flaw is that her duplicates are based on what she knows and believes about her target rather than their true selves. She is killed by Lyudmila Pavlichenko in the twelfth match.
Yang Guifei (楊貴妃, Yō Kihi)
One of the Witches invited to participate in the Walpurgis. Her title is "Desire Witch" and her desire is "To Be Desired". Her odds of winning were calculated to be 15.3:1. She is incredibly vain, seeking to prove she is the most beautiful and popular woman. She is so beautiful that the demon servants and people in the audience fight over her and scramble to serve her. When her match started, she said her opponent Charlotte Corday was beneath her and told her to kill herself and save her the trouble, but was refused. Her weapon is her gown. Her magic allows her to control the cloth of her gown by making it extend, harden, become razor sharp, etc. Each mode of the cloth is designated by a different bian lian face. She decapitates Charlotte Corday in the thirteenth match and is declared the winner, unaware that Corday faked her death.
Charlotte Corday (シャーロット・コーデイ)
One of the Witches invited to participate in the Walpurgis. Her title is "Killing Witch" and her desire is "To Be a Hero". Her odds of winning were calculated to be 67.6:1. She is quite neurotic and lacks confidence. Before the thirteenth match, Agrat, who figured out that Agatha and Lakshmibai were still alive, ordered her to find and kill them, galvanizing her by calling her special, but she starts her match first. Her weapon is a knife. She is decapitated by Yang Guifei in the thirteenth match without revealing what her magic was, but she mysteriously reappears in Agatha, Lakshmibai, and Lilia's hiding place to attack them. Lakshmibai shoots her in the head, only to find that Agatha and Lilia cannot see or hear her, then she fully heals and attacks again. As Agrat explains to Lilith and Lilum, her magic functions by choosing an assassination target, then dying. This will summon a magical construct in her shape with her memories and personality to the target's location that can only be seen or heard by the target. The construct can regenerate indefinitely and will not stop until the target is dead. Once the target is dead, Charlotte will be resurrected. Once Lakshmibai convinces Agatha of her attacker's existence, Agatha proves the construct is not intangible by striking it with a wild swing and then breaking plates on the floor to give away her location when she steps on them. Agatha eventually tricks the construct into charging through a door and closes it, claiming it is now inside Lakshmibai. The construct is trapped in an endless black void and begs Agrat for help, but Agrat says she has outlived her usefulness as she was just a pawn to detect the hiding place.
Amelia Earhart (アメリア・イアハート)
One of the Witches invited to participate in the Walpurgis. Her title is "Sky Witch" and her desire is "Freedom". Her odds of winning were calculated to be 41.9:1. Her weapon is a helmetless spacesuit with rocket boots that allow her to fly. Her magic allows her to create an "Un-Freedom" field in a ten meter radius around her that makes anything within except for her become slow, giving the illusion of her having super speed.
Maria Anna Mozart (マリア・アンナ・モーツァルト)
One of the Witches invited to participate in the Walpurgis. Her title is "Sound Witch" and her desire is "Playing". Her odds of winning were calculated to be 573.8:1. Her weapons are piano keyboards attached to her sleeves. Her magic allows her to use her keyboards to generate destructive sound and a sound that disrupts the nerves.
Komatsuhime (小松姫)
One of the Witches invited to participate in the Walpurgis. Her odds of winning were calculated to be 166.1:1.
Zenobia (ゼノビア)
A Witch invited to the Walpurgis. Her title is "War Witch" and her desire is currently unknown. Her odds of winning were calculated to be 46.8:1. She is a member of The Witch's Hammer.
La Voisin (ラ・ヴォワザン)
One of the Witches invited to participate in the Walpurgis. Her odds of winning were calculated to be 92.1:1.
Florence Nightingale (フローレンス・ナイチンゲール)
One of the Witches invited to participate in the Walpurgis. Her odds of winning were calculated to be 26.4:1.

=== Demons ===
Agrat Bat Mahlat (アグラット・バット・マハラト, Aguratto Batto Maharato)
The queen of the demons and the host of the Walpurgis tournament. She had held the Walpurgis tournament many times in the past and aims to use the energy gathered from the fights to resurrect her seven deceased daughters.
Lilith (リリス, Ririsu)
A demon serving the Queen of Demons Agrat Bat Mahlat. She and Lilim were responsible in handing the invites to the Witches and transporting them to Agrat.
Lilim (リリム, Ririmu)
A demon serving the Queen of Demons Agrat Bat Mahlat. She and Lilith were responsible in handing the invites to the Witches and transporting them to Agrat.
Lilitu (リリートゥ, Rirītu)
The commenter of Walpurgis.
Kiskill Rila (キスキル・リラ, Kisukiru Rira)
She wears a lab coat and takes a scientific interest in the Witches' powers, often analyzing and ranking them.
Bubel (ブベル, Buberu)
The Demon of Healing who works in the infirmary of the Walpurgis tournament.
Lilia (リリア, Riria)
A demon servant whom Agatha Christie ropes into helping her investigation.

=== Other characters ===
Marsh (マーシュ, Marshu)
A maid in the service of Elizabeth Bathory's family. Bathory accidentally killed her while playing with a knife, leading to her psychosis.
Qin Shi Huang (秦始皇, Shikōtei)
The first emperor of China.
Li Tian (李天, Ri Ten)
A close friend to Wu Zetian, after she moved into his village. After he was beaten to death by bullying elitists, this led to Zetian aspiring to reach the top so that no one could hurt her again.
Toyo (臺與/台与)
Yogi/Himiko's niece and successor who idolizes her.
Former Himiko (卑弥呼)
The previous priestess and founder of the village where Yogi and her family lived. She was a charlatan who ordered Yogi's father sacrificed and Yogi and her mother exiled, claiming it would bring rain and bountiful harvests. When Yogi's mother died, Yogi sneaked into her compound and killed her in revenge, then convinced the people that she was her successor.
Anne Bonny (アン・ボニー, An bonī)
The best friend of Mary Read, before she betrayed her.
Maria Theresa (マリア・テレジア, Maria Terejia)
The ruler of the Habsburg dominions, she was the sovereign of Austria, Hungary, Croatia, Bohemia, Transylvania, and more. She is the mother of the witch Marie Antoinette.

== Publication ==
Written by Homura Kawamoto and illustrated by Makoto Shiozuka, The War of Greedy Witches started in Coamix's Monthly Comic Zenon on October 24, 2020. Coamix has collected its chapters into individual tankōbon volumes. The first volume was released on June 18, 2021. As of August 20, 2026, 16 volumes have been released.

The manga has been published digitally in English by Coamix and Imagineer's MangaHot app since December 2022. In June 2024, Yen Press announced that it licensed the series for English publication, with the first volume released in November the same year.

=== Volumes ===
No.	Original release date	Original ISBN	English release date	English ISBN
1	June 18, 2021	978-4-86720-242-5	November 19, 2024	979-8-8554-0108-0
1. "Walpurgis"; 2. "The War Begins"; 3. "The Ways of the World"; 4. "Wings of Desire"
2	September 18, 2021	978-4-86720-264-7	April 29, 2025	979-8-8554-0142-4
5. "Justice and Evil"; 6. "Desires and Wishes"; 7. "The Reason to Fight"; 8. "Emergence"; 9. "Endless Ambition"
3	December 20, 2021	978-4-86720-287-6	August 26, 2025	979-8-8554-0144-8
10. "The Monarch's Road"; 11. "True Feelings"; 12. "The Witches' Odds"; 13. "Love and Oni"
4	June 20, 2022	978-4-86720-392-7	February 24, 2026	979-8-8554-0146-2
14. "The One Who is Worth of Love"; 15. "What We Lost"; 16. "True Love"; 17. "Women of the World"; 18. "Silence"
5	October 20, 2022	978-4-86720-431-3	August 25, 2026	979-8-8554-0148-6
19. "The World of Two People"; 20. "The Pride of a Noble"; 21. "The Empress and the Queen"; 22. "Adapting"
6	February 20, 2023	978-4-86720-467-2	December 15, 2026	979-8-8554-0150-9
23. "The Woman of My Dreams"; 24. "The Queen's Magic"; 25. "The Heart of Marie Antoinette"; 26. "Clash of Brains"
7	July 20, 2023	978-4-86720-525-9	—	—
27. "The Power of Knowledge"; 28. "The Knowledge of Huang Yueying"; 29. "Possibility and Truth"; 30. "Human Potential"; 31. "The Legendary Witch"
8	November 20, 2023	978-4-86720-588-4	—	—
32. "Pure Pure World"; 33. "Hikoboshi in Love"; 34. "Flames of Love"; 35. "The Hammer of the Witches"
9	March 19, 2024	978-4-86720-628-7	—	—
36. "Hot and Heavy"; 37. "Legendary Masterpiece"; 38. "Immortal Being"; 39. "True Face"
10	July 20, 2024	978-4-86720-669-0	—	—
40. "The Shape of Desire"; 41. "The Robber and the Robbed"; 42. "Deduction"; 43. "The Witches' Gathering"
11	November 20, 2024	978-4-86720-704-8	—	—
44. "Murder in the Waiting Room"; 45. "Martial Arts and Dance"; 46. "The Fist of Offense and Defense"; 47. "The Dying Swan"
12	March 19, 2025	978-4-86720-749-9	—	—
48. "The Seeking Monster"; 49. "The Fateful Blow"; 50. "Cooperation"; 51. "Mask"
13	July 18, 2025	978-4-86720-783-3	—	—
52. "A Maiden's Bond"; 53. "The Queen's Karma"; 54. "The Day She Became a Hero"; 55. "Awakening"
14	November 20, 2025	978-4-86720-836-6	—	—
56. "Conspirators"; 57. "And Then There Were None"; 58. "A World For Just the Two of Us"; 59. "A Tale Just For Me"
15	March 19, 2026	978-4-86720-871-7	—	—
60. "Counterstrike"; 61. "A Heart's Pain"; 62. "The Final Shot"; 63. "Assassination Request"
16	August 20, 2026	978-4-86720-922-6	—	—
64. "The Siren of the State"; 65. "The Encroaching Shadow"; 66. "The Enchanting Angel"; 67. "The Invisible Assailant"

=== Chapters not yet in tankōbon format ===
68. "Unending Desire"
69. "Requiem"
70. "Discordance"
71. "The Genius's Shadow"
72. "Wings of Un-Freedom"

== Reception ==
By July 2023, the manga had over 1 million copies in circulation.
