= List of Restaurant to Another World characters =

This is a list of characters for the light novel and anime series Restaurant to Another World.

== Western Restaurant Nekoya ==
=== Main Staff ===
Master (店主, Tenshu; lit. 'Owner')
Voiced by: Junichi Suwabe (Japanese); Christopher R. Sabat (English)
The owner of the Western Restaurant Nekoya. A single man in his mid-thirties, he is the grandchild of a couple who opened the restaurant, and inherited it when his grandfather died ten years ago. An outstanding culinary master, he enjoys cooking for the eclectic group of patrons that visit every Saturday. Resulting from the mingling of so many diverse beings within one space, the restaurant has become a neutral region, since none of the guests – whatever their personal differences – want to miss out on the Master's cuisine. His grandmother, Koyomi (also known as Yomi, a heroine from the other world) entrusted him with the key to the door; should he decide to close the door between both worlds, he is told that he must break the key.
Aletta (アレッタ, Aretta)
Voiced by: Sumire Uesaka (Japanese); Jill Harris (English)
A demon girl originally hailing from the Demon Kingdom on the other world's Eastern Continent. When the Demon God was vanquished by the legendary Four Heroes, the power he had once bestowed upon his demonic subjects waned, and as a result Aletta was born no different from humans except for the goat horns on her head. Rejected by human society and ending up a vagrant, she discovered the Nekoya's interdimensional entrance and began working every Saturday as a waitress. She later finds additional work as Sarah Gold's housekeeper.
"Kuro" (『黒』; lit. 'Black') (Note: The anime web-site shows "クロ" instead.)
Voiced by: Saori Ōnishi (Japanese); Monica Rial (English)
One of the other world's Ancient Six imbued with death, a power which inadvertently killed every mortal being that happened to cross her path. To avoid killing innocents, she banished herself to the world's moon. By chance, she found the door of the Nekoya appearing in her vicinity, entered the restaurant and, naive to human customs owing to her long isolation, ended up consuming so much chicken curry that her old friend, the "Red Queen", prompted the Master to hire her as a waitress to pay off her food bill. To interact with the staff and patrons, "Kuro" adopts the form of a black-haired elf girl, but usually communicates via telepathy instead of speaking aloud (in the anime, she eventually opens up to her co-workers by speaking vocally). She unofficially serves as the restaurant's guardian, should a situation arise. Of the diners, only Altorius, Alexander and several priests of the Ancient Six are aware of her true identity.
Daiki Yamagata (山方大樹, Yamagata Daiki) / The Previous Owner (先代店主, Sendai Tenshu)
Voiced by: Kazuhiko Inoue
The now-deceased previous owner of the Nekoya and the current Master's grandfather. He is shown in flashbacks when the story reflects upon the older customers who became his grandfather's regulars. He met Koyomi near the end of (or just after) World War II, and the two eventually fell in love. He gave the restaurant to the current Master, his grandson and apprentice.
Yomi (ヨミ) / Koyomi Yamagata (山方暦, Yamagata Koyomi)
Voiced by: Kikuko Inoue
A female warrior reared as a Demon-slayer, and a member of the legendary Four Heroes from the other world. During their battle with the Demon God over seventy years ago, she was cast through an interdimensional boundary and wound up on Earth, where she married the Master's grandfather and founded the Nekoya with him. Initially, only Altorius, one of her comrades, knew about this secret. She is still alive on Earth despite her advanced age and visits her grandson from time to time. Furthermore, its implied she retains some of her magical ability. She holds the key to permanently stop doors to warp and a fail-safe, but decided to entrust it to her grandson, seeing what progress the restaurant has made; should her grandson decide to close the door, he must break the key.
Saki Yamagata (山方, Yamagata Saki)
Koyomi's granddaughter and the Master's niece by his older brother. A twenty-year-old second-year college student, she has become interested in cooking very early and, eager to run her own restaurant, seeks an internship at her uncle's restaurant. Seeing her as a viable successor for her grandson, Koyomi deliberately sends her to Nekoya on a Saturday, without telling Saki about the restaurant's special clientele or the Master of his niece's arrival on that day. After overcoming her surprise and learning about the restaurant's secret, Saki has settled in and become friends with Aletta.

=== Restaurant Support ===
Individuals from Japan, who are friends with the current Master. They help supply the restaurant with ingredients; some of them are actually aware of Western Restaurants Nekoya's otherworldly secret.

The Flying Puppy Owner
Voiced by: Kenichi Suzumura (Japanese); Luis Bermudez (English)
He is the second and current owner of the Flying Puppy Bakery, who supplies Western Restaurant Nekoya with a variety of cookies, cakes, and other desserts. An old childhood friend of the current Master, he is aware of Nekoya's secret and helps the restaurant as much as he can. The bakery itself is located just above the restaurant, allowing easy access by the Master should he need anything.
Shouta Kimura
The bread delivery boy from Kimura Bakery, who delivers Western Restaurant Nekoya's bread supply; he works under his father, Kimura Bakery's owner. He ponders why Western Restaurant Nekoya requests for bread restock on Saturday's despite knowing the restaurant is closed. He is shown to have a crush on Aletta, who he assumes is a foreign cosplayer.
The Leonhart Owner
A former trading company employee who retired in his old age to open a bar in the building where the Nekoya is located, offering finger foods and liquors from all over the world. He also supplies the Master, and is therefore privy to the restaurant's secret.
Haruko
Haruko is the wife of the owner of the Laughing Dragon, a Chinese restaurant in Nekoya's neighborhood. The two owners are good friends to the former and current Masters; the current Master apprenticed at their place for a time. It is hinted that Haruko's daughter was once the Master's girlfriend, but they separated under unfavorable circumstances, a fact the Master still feels touchy about.

== The Patrons from the Other World ==
The regular patrons call each other nicknames based on their favorite Nekoya dishes. As Earth's modern food preparation is more advanced than how their world prepares versions of their favorite dishes, the patrons rarely alter their dining choices; even when offered a menu.

Altorius (アルトリウス, Arutoriusu) / "Pork Loin-Cutlet" (ロースカツ, Rōsukatsu)
Voiced by: Motomu Kiyokawa (Japanese); Charlie Campbell (English)
An elderly sage and magician, and one of the famous Four Heroes of the Eastern Continent. (Note: In the novels, three main continents are specifically detailed. The first is the so-called Eastern Continent, which sports cultures similar to medieval Europe; the second one, the Western Continent, features the rugged Mountain Nation and its neighbor, the sophisticated Ocean Nation, both reflecting Feudal Japan, and the Sand Nation, which is remniscient of Earth's Persia and Arabia. The Southern Continent is still largely unexplored by the civilizations of the Eastern and Western Continents, but it is known that the races found there – including usually hostile ones like goblins and ogres – are living in a peculiar state of civilized harmony with each other, as well as being the home of other strange beings, such as Lilliputians.) As the restaurant's very first patron, he is responsible for translating the Nekoya main menu entries into his world's language. His former pupil, the half-elf sorceress Victoria Samanark, is also a regular at the Nekoya.
Tatsugorou (タツゴロウ) / "Teriyaki" (テリヤキ)
Voiced by: Hōchū Ōtsuka (Japanese); John Swasey (English)
A legendary wandering swordsmaster from the Western Continent's Mountain Nation. He is good friends with Altorius, despite (or perhaps because) they often end up arguing about which of their respective favorite dishes is better than the other.
"Red Queen" (『赤の女王』, "Aka no Joō") / "Beef Stew" (ビーフシチュー, Bīfu Shichū)
Voiced by: Shizuka Itō (Japanese); Stephanie Young (English)
A female shapeshifting red dragon and one of the Ancient Six in the other world, known by the title "Lord of Red" (赤い神, "Akai no kami") to her worshippers. When visiting the restaurant – whose door opens right onto her mountain lair – she adopts the form of a voluptuous, red-haired human woman, with large horns sprouting from her head; to avoid conflict, she arrives only after the other diners have all left. She was already a regular patron in the old owner's time, and because of both her natural avarice and her particular fondness for the Master's beef stew (of which she habitually takes a huge pot back with her for a snack), she considers the Nekoya and its staff her personal "treasure".
Sarah Gold (サラ・ゴールド, Sara Gōrudo) / "Mince Meat Cutlet II" (メンチカツ2世, Menchikatsu Nisei)
Voiced by: Kiyono Yasuno (Japanese); Caitlin Glass (English)
Sarah, is a member of the influential Gold merchant family and great-grand daughter of the deceased William Gold, a legendary treasure hunter and the founder of her family business. Infected by adventure lust (which is regarded as a curse within her family), she became a professional treasure hunter herself, and following William's descriptions to his personal door to the Nekoya in an abandoned mine, she gets to enjoy the Master's Minced Meat Cutlet, which was William's favorite dish. In the course of her visits to the Nekoya, she also becomes personally close to Heinrich Seeleman, trading friendly barbs with him.
Heinrich Seeleman (ハインリヒ・ゼーレマン, Hainrihi Zēreman) / "Fried Shrimp" (エビフライ, Ebi Furai)
Voiced by: Tomokazu Sugita (Japanese); J. Michael Tatum (English)
A nobleman from the Eastern Continent's great Duchy of Samanark who is obsessed with fried shrimp, whose taste he has not enjoyed since he left his childhood sea town to become a knight. After having stumbled upon the Nekoya in the course of a vital mission, he enjoyed several courses of his meal and left his sword as collateral. Unable to find his way back to the Nekoya for several years, Tatsugoro finally helped him in understanding the restaurant's schedule and returning for more fried shrimp. On the occasions of his visits, he also becomes closely acquainted with Sarah Gold.
Alphonse Flügel (アルフォンス・フリューゲル, Arufonsu Furyūgeru) / "Curry Rice" (カレーライス, Karē Raisu)
Voiced by: Fumihiko Tachiki (Japanese); Jeremy Schwartz (English)
An admiral of the Samanark duchal navy, who was shipwrecked by a Kraken attack and stranded on a lonely tropical island for twenty years. On the island, Flügel discovered a door to the Nekoya, which was then still run by the Master's grandfather, and has been sustaining himself on the Master's curry rice and the company he found there. After being rescued, he manages to locate an alternative door to the restaurant and indulge himself on his favorite dish once more.
Thomas Alfade (トマス・アルフェイド, Tomasu Arufeido) / "Meat Sauce" (ミートソース, Mīto Sōsu)
Voiced by: Yusaku Yara (Japanese); Barry Yandell (English)
The former owner of a food supplying company in the other world, specializing in pasta dishes, which have become a popular cuisine in his kingdom. His inspiration actually stems from his monthly business interaction with the Nekoya restaurant, whose door opens right into his company's cellar, and his desire to consume their pasta dishes outside of his visits. In exchange for some of the restaurant's Day of Satur income (which is useless to Nekoya and only taken out of professionalism) and a free serving of spaghetti with meat sauce, Thomas supplies the Master with exclusive ingredients from the other world in order to adjust his dishes to his Saturday customers' tastes.
Sirius Alfade (シリウス・アルフェイド, Shiriusu Arufeido) / "Naporitan" (ナポリタン)
Voiced by: Hiro Shimono (Japanese); Stephen Fu (English)
Thomas Alfade's grandson, who is entrusted with his grandfather's secret upon his first visit to Nekoya in order to succeed Thomas as the head of the Alfade Company. Like his grandfather, he has also become quite fond of the Nekoya Meat Sauce Pasta.
Johnathan Winsberg / "Pizza"
Voiced by: Yuya Hozumi (Japanese); Alex Mai (English)
Sirius Alfade's childhood friend and personal chef. Because Sirius is unable to analyze taste like his grandfather, he decided to take Jonathan with him to Western Restaurant Nekoya. Once there, he discovers the restaurants Italian style dishes, with Sirius requesting if it is possible for him to replicate the dishes with the ingredients from their world. He takes a liking to the restaurant's Neapolitan pizza.
Adelheid (アーデルハイド, Āderuhaido) / "Chocolate Parfait" (チョコレートパフェ, Chokorēto Pafe)
Voiced by: Reina Ueda (Japanese); Jeannie Tirado, Alexis Tipton (Season 2) (English)
The young princess of the Great Empire, the youngest great power on the other world's Eastern Continent, (Note: As is gradually outlined in the novel series, the Eastern Continent was originally dominated by a realm called The Ancient Kingdom until a half-elf monarch, determined to not let the achievements of his rule go to waste for future generations, sought to achieve immortality but instead ended up as an undead lich – which is a primary reason why half-elves are generally distrusted and barred from obtaining high-level government offices in the Other World. After the king's corruption and subsequent exile inside his ruined capital, the Ancient Kingdom eventually split into the Demon Kingdom and the Grand Duchy of Samanark; the Great Empire came into being after the Demon King's attempt to revive the Demon God, just 70 years before the overall story begins.) named after her great-grandmother. She is often sent by her parents to her grandfather's country estate for her health, since she is suffering from a lingering disease known as the "pauper killer disease" (her symptoms imply it to be asthma). Her late grandfather took her to the Nekoya during one of her visits as a young child, during which she came to enjoy the Master's chocolate parfait, making her another regular. Her feeling of loneliness is also alleviated once she befriends fellow regulars Shareef, Ranner, and Princess Victoria.
Wilhelm (ヴィルヘイム, Viruheimu) / "Croquette" (コロッケ, Korokke)
Voiced by: Hiroshi Naka (Japanese); Bruce Carrey (English)
The late founder and first ruler of the Great Empire, and the son of Alexander, one of the Four Heroes. He is also Adelheid's grandfather, whom he took to the Nekoya to alleviate her loneliness from being away from her family on her last visit before his demise. He was also the first person from the other world whom the new Master had met while visiting his grandfather as a kid. Owing to his passion for the restaurant's croquettes, Wilhelm introduced potatoes from Earth to his world, where they quickly became a very valuable food source and significantly contributed to the Empire's growth, making them his lasting legacy.
Lionel (ライオネル, Raioneru) / "Pork Cutlet Rice Bowl" (カツ丼, Katsudon)
Voiced by: Nobuyuki Hiyama (Japanese); Jeremy Inman (English)
One of the old owner's oldest patrons, Lionel is a powerful lion demon warrior from the Demon Kingdom and the former leader of a raider gang who was captured by the half-elf hero Alexander and seemed destined to end his days as a gladiator slave. He was spared this fate when the Nekoya door incidentally appeared right inside his holding cell. After having been strengthened by the food he was served there, he won his freedom in less than a year (a feat never before accomplished) and stayed on as a gladiator champion, ever since returning to partake in the Nekoya's pork cutlet rice bowl dish for the past twenty years.
Gaganpo (ガガンポ) / "Omelette Rice" (オムライス, Omuraisu)
Voiced by: Makoto Yasumura (Japanese); Tyson Rinehart (English)
A lizardman hailing from the marshlands of the most southeastern tip of the other world's Eastern Continent. Already an adult at the age of eight years, he is a veteran hunter and warrior among his hunter-gatherer tribe, the Blue Tails. His tribe was visited by the Nekoya door about thirty years ago; and as a result of its wondrous appearance and the delicious food found on the other side, the site where the door appears is now a sacred spot for the tribe, who sends its worthiest champion through the door every Saturday to bring back some of the restaurant's omelette rice for the tribe to enjoy; dining manners and how to pay for the meals have been passed down as "sacred words". As champion, Gaganpo is entitled to eat his own share inside the shop, a luxury that motivates him to consistently be the champion of his tribe.
Fardania (ファルダニア, Farudania) / "Tofu Steak" (豆腐ステーキ, Tōfu Sutēki)
Voiced by: Yōko Hikasa (Japanese); Dawn M. Bennett (English)
A young female wood elf who is a half-orphan and doted on by her constantly worried father. While gathering ingredients for dinner, she discovered the door to the Nekoya, and when the restaurant's usual menu did not appeal to her due to her people's vegan disposition, the Master created a tofu steak dish especially for her. After enjoying its taste, she has become very eager to learn all she can about creating culinary delights in order not to let Elven cuisine lose out to humanity's culinary skills. As a result, she tends to converse with the Master and Aletta in a polite yet snooty way.
Alice
Voiced by: Megumi Toda (Japanese); Emi Lo (English)
A pre-adolescent elf girl. Born to a pair of half-elves, she turned out to be a full-blood elf changeling, making her mature much slower than her siblings. Abandoned in the woods after her parents died in an epidemic, she encounters and is taken in by Fardania; the next morning, a Nekoya door manifests at their campsite. After their first meal together, Fardania accepts Alice as her culinary apprentice.
Victoria Samanark (ヴィクトリア・サマナーク, Vikutoria Samanāku) / "Pudding a la Mode" (プリンアラモード, Purin a ra Mōdo)
Voiced by: Yukari Tamura (Japanese); Jad Saxton (English)
A member of the ancient duchal Samanark family of the Eastern Continent, Victoria manifested a latent half-elven genetic strain running in her family line which rendered her an outcast in human and elven society; she became known as the reclusive "Witch of the Western Tower" and "The Duchy's Witch Princess". After discovering and developing her natural aptitude at sorcery, she became the star pupil of the sage Altorius and first visited the Nekoya in his company, where she became responsible for writing up the dessert menu. In order to store her stash of take-out pudding, she has invented a magical equivalent for a powered icebox. She later begins taking her niece and nephew with her to Nekoya after she discovers the two of them snooping in her room and swears them to secrecy.
Alfred (アルフレッド, Arufureddo) and Margarete (マルガレーテ, Marugarēte)
Voiced by: Hinako Mori (Alfred) and Mio Hoshitani (Margarete) (Japanese), Ciarán Strange (Alfred) and (Kristi Rothrock) (Margarete) (English)
The first-born prince and princess of the Samanark Duchy and Victoria's adolescent twin nephew and niece, who once out of curiosity snuck into her tower room and ate up a left-over portion of her stored pudding a la mode. In turn, they get invited to the Nekoya by her, where they also develop a strong liking for its children's lunch.
Arte (アルテ, Arute) / "Hamburg Steak" (ハンバーグ, Hanbāgu)
Voiced by: Ayaka Suwa (Japanese); Amber Lee Connors (English)
Arte is a young mermaid from the other world's southern seas, and a priestess of the Lord of the Sea, one of the Ancient Six. Thanks to her magic, she is able to change her fins into dragon feet, which enables her to visit the Nekoya after one of her superiors had invited her there.
Roukei (ロウケイ)
Voiced by: Yoshitsugu Matsuoka (Japanese); Howard Wang (English)
A young fisherman from the Eastern Continent's Ocean Nation who was caught by surprise by a storm at sea, but rescued from drowning by Arte. In repayment for his salvation, Arte asked him for some money to pay for her favorite dish at the Nekoya, Hamburg steak. After accompanying her to the restaurant, Roukei has become very fond of both Arte and the hamburg steak himself.
Guilhem (ギレム, Giremu) and Gard (ガルド, Gardo) / "Whiskey"
Voiced by: Tetsu Inada (Guilhem) and Tomoyuki Shimura (Gard) (Japanese); Bill Jenkins (Gard), Greg Dulcie (Guilhem) (English)
Guilhem is a dwarf brewer who once happened to stumble upon the Nekoya and developed a passion for its fried seafood dishes and alcoholic beverages. After introducing his initially sceptical friend Gard, a glassmith, to these exotic delicacies, the two of them establish a waystation at the site where the Nekoya door appears, but retain exclusive access to the interdimensional door for themselves. Guilhem has also discovered the formula for making whiskey and has been eagerly distributing it in his homeworld.
Johan / "Canapé"
A wandering human merchant who chanced upon the Nekoya door in Guilhem and Gard's waystation while seeking to purchase whiskey from the dwarves. After his first visit to the Nekoya, and after clearing a slight misunderstanding, Johan ends up befriending the two dwarves and henceforth enters the Nekoya by their side whenever he visits the dwarf realm.
Shareef (シャリーフ, Sharīfu) / "Coffee Float" (コーヒーフロート, Kōhīfurōto)
Voiced by: Atsushi Tamaru (Japanese); Ricco Fajardo (English)
The young prince of the Western Continent's Sand Nation and a trained sorcerer. He has a crush on Princess Adelheid, which is his primary reason for visiting the Nekoya, but initially lacks the courage to confess his feelings to her. Due to his fondness for the restaurant's chilled coffee, he and his sister introduced the drink to their nation, where it has become a highly popular treat.
Ranner (ラナー, Lanner) / "Cream Soda Float" (クリームソーダ, Kurīmusōda)
Voiced by: Shino Shimoji (Japanese); Elizabeth Maxwell (English)
Shareef's younger half-sister by a sorceress who became their father's concubine and trained them both in the magic arts. She supports her brother in pursuing his affections for the Eastern Empire's princess. At the Nekoya, she particularly loves the soft serve floats.
Tiana Silvario XVI (ティアナ・シルバリオ16世, Tiana Shirubario Jūrokusei) / "Fruit Crepe"
Voiced by: Yoshino Aoyama (Japanese); Anastasia Muñoz (English)
A Fairy, and the Queen of the Land of Flowers. After the Nekoya door appeared in her kingdom, she regularly takes a selected group of her subjects to the restaurant to partake in its fruit crepés. She has a younger sister named Tielia, who is wandering the world as an adventurer.
Christian (クリスティアン, Kurisutian) / "Natto Spaghetti"
Voiced by: Katsuyuki Konishi (Japanese); Patrick McAlister (English)
A wood elf and friend of Fardania's father Edmond, Christian is a knowledgeable traveler who, following his own encounter with the Nekoya, has taken an interest in human food preparation techniques and tries to adapt them to the Elven cuisine. He is especially proud of having replicated miso and tofu using Elven beans.
Arius (アーリウス, Āriusu) and Iris (イリス, Irisu) / "Carpaccio"
Voiced by: Ayaka Asai (Arius) and Nao Tōyama (Iris) (Japanese); Mikaela Krantz (Arius) and Bryn Apprill (Iris) (English)
A mated pair of juvenile Sirens from the Continental Sea between the other world's Eastern and Western Continent. While Arius is knowledgeable but shy, Iris is the more vigorous and impulsive of the two. After finding the Nekoya door on the island where Alphonse Flügel was stranded for twenty years, they have settled on the island for their regular visits to the restaurant to enjoy its carpaccio, and decided to make the island their new nest.
Soemon (ソウエモン, Souemon) and Doshun (ドウシュン, Doshun) / "Okonomiyaki"
Voiced by: Tsuyoshi Koyama (Souemon) and Daisuke Hirakawa (Doshun), Bill Butts (Souemon) and Oscar Seung (Doshun) (English)
Soemon, a samurai, and Doshun, a fox-like onmyōji and diviner, are natives of the rivaling Mountain and Ocean Nations. Therefore, when they meet, they are usually very derisive towards each other, but once they are served their mutual favorite dish – okonomiyaki – they quickly end up setting aside their personal differences, even to the point of trying out each other's variety.
Celestina Fragran / "Pound Cake"
The Eastern Continent's youngest High Priestess of the Lord of Light. Her faith preaches moderation, but Celestina has trouble following her beliefs after her predecessor, Bridgette, had introduced her to the culinary wonders beyond the door opening within her training grounds. Once in the restaurant, she indulgences in various types of pound cake provided by the Flying Puppy Bakery, who sees her as one of the bakery's best customers.
Carlotta / "Brandy"
A priestess of the Lord of Light, and one of Celestia's three favored disciples who are entrusted with the secret of Nekoya's existence. Of common birth, she is nevertheless a skilled undead hunter. She particularly enjoys the alcoholic drinks in the restaurant.
Julianne
A noble-born priestess of the Lord of Light, and one of Celestia's three favored disciples.
Anna / "Strawberry Yogurt Mousse"
A priestess of the Lord of Light, and one of Celestia's three favored disciples. Born as a half-elf to human parents, she was abandoned at the steps of the Temple of Light. In the future, she is mentioned as being responsible for introducing Earth sweets into the other world.
Romero and Julietta / "Beefsteak"
Voiced by: Taku Yashiro (Romero) and Miyu Tomita (Julietta), Zeno Robinson (Romero) and Marisa Duran (Julietta) (English)
A fugitive Dark Retainer couple on the run from Julietta's father, a nobleman who wanted to punish Romero for making his daughter into his "plaything". However, Julietta allowed herself to be converted by Romero because her strong love for him made her wanting to stay with him forever. They stumbled upon Western Restaurant Nekoya while on the run, and soon fell in love with both its food and wine. They see the restaurant as a form of salvation, despite several customers – Altorius, a mage; Heinrich, a knight; and the priestesses Celestina and Carlotta – being sworn enemies of Dark Retainers (in fact, Carlotta merely gets annoyed by the couple's doting). The couple's name (and overall situation) is a play off of Romeo and Juliet.
Rorona / "Roast Beef"
Voiced by: Manami Numakura (Japanese); Macy Anne Johnson (English)
A priestess and the latest member of the Black Brood (also known as the Vampire Nation), an enclave of vampiric worshippers of the "Lord of Black" ("Kuro") on the Southern Continent. After first coming into the Nekoya, she befriends Romero and Julietta, and upon their recommendations takes a liking to the restaurant's roast beef. She senses Kuro's dark power, but doesn't recognize her true nature.
Pikke and Pakke / "Cream Croquette"
Voiced by: Minami Takahashi (Pikke) and Yūki Takada (Pakke) (Japanese), Marin Miller (Pikke) and Risa Mei (Pakke) (English)
A married pair of halflings who travel the world, selling stew made with "knight sauce" (the sauces Thomas Alfade had copied from Nekoya's menu) and always make sure that they manage to find a location where the "Door of Nekoya" appears every Day of Satur. (Note: In the novel series, halflings are depicted as the most enthusiastic customers of the Nekoya because of their love for good food, but also as the most infrequent regulars because their race is instinctively driven to wander the world nearly all their life long. Because of racial solidarity, the location of any Nekoya door is freely shared among them and even other people who seem to appreciate good cuisine. In a slight deviation from their common popular description, their foot hair grows on the soles instead of the dorsal surfaces of their feet.)
Ellen and Herman / "Daily Special"
A married woodcutter couple living in a small realm in the northern part of the Eastern Continent who visit Nekoya with their children, Kai and Bona, once a month for a small treat, which they had been doing for fifteen years. Every time they visit, they order the daily special due to their limited budget, allowing them to try a different dish every time.
Klaus
The third adolescent son of the northern realm's ruling family, who was removed from the royal court to avoid entangling him in a conflict of succession with his older brothers. While a bit naive towards the commoners' life, he is considerate and generous. Lost during a trip through the realm, he was found and cared for by Herman and Ellen. Unable to serve him proper food, the couple takes him to the Nekoya, where he indulges in roasted salmon.
Fairey / "Karubidon"
The 14-year-old high-born, mixed-blood daughter of a princess from the Eastern Continent, who resides with her family in the Ocean Nation and visits Nekoya once every few months because she detests Doshun, another regular who is a member of her father's court. During her visits, she disguises herself as a commoner in order to hide her identity as a princess, allowing her to enjoy her favorite dish, Karubidon, however she pleases.
Rat
A halfling bard who, to his own embarrassment, once attempted to dine and dash after visiting Nekoya for the first time. Since that time, he is unable to pass through the door that appears on every Day of Satur. However, he is able to exploit a small loophole by following other diners into the restaurant so long as they open the door first, one such example being when he introduced the Ogres Tatsuji and Otora to the restaurant after he was captured by them, in order to avoid being eaten by them.
Tatsuji and Otora / "Roast Chicken"
An Ogre couple from the Western Continent who learn of the Nekoya from the halfling Rat after he convinces them to let him go after being captured by them. Once there, they develop a fondness for the many varieties of roast chicken they serve, as well as their alcohol.
Touichirou / "Hot Dogs"
A swordsman who grew up in a tiny town, abandoned his status as his family's heir and crossed the Eastern Continent with his wife, Aya, a priestess of the Lord of Earth and daughter of a senior priest. Though the two of them are quite fond of the resatraunt's hot dogs, Aya remains unable to leave the house due to having to take care of their newborn child. Thus Touichirou has taken up the task to go Nekoya and bring takeout home with him.
Alisa and Meimei / "Mushroom Spaghetti"
Two best friends who enter through separate doors, meet up inside Nekoya and share a mutual fondness for Mushroom Spaghetti. While Alisa is a talented human healer who lives in a nameless village in the middle of a forest, Meimei is a young, orphaned demon girl with large white goat horns who lives on a farm in the Ocean Nation. During their visits, they spend their time catching up with each other and trading their different variations of mushroom spaghetti.
Aisha / "Seafood Pilaf"
A young noblewoman from the Land of Sand who married into the Great Empire's nobility. She was first introduced to Nekoya by her servant, Alfred, and though at first scared by the monster diners that also visited the restaurant, she quickly develops a liking to a dish known as seafood pilaf. She later introduces her friend Linda to the Nekoya as well.
Linda Alfade
One of Thomas Alfade's grandchildren, and the leader of an Alfade branch business in the Empire. After the Empire and the Sand Nation's diplomatic relationship intensifies with Shareef's interest in marrying Princess Adelheid, Linda is tasked with providing Sand Nation dishes for Shareef's impending visit. To enable her to learn more about them, her friend Aisha takes her to the Nekoya, where Linda gains the first-hand culinary experience she needs for her assignment.
Yūto and Taro / "Ginger Pork"
A teenage Mountain Nation hunter and his dog. Yūto's old teacher was also a regular at Nekoya, and it is suggested that he told Yūto to keep his hunting in the area where the door appears. Because he possesses little money, he pays for his meals with the meat he hunts.
Mashira
An old boar hunter and Yūto's mentor who particularly enjoys the pork dishes offered in the Nekoya.
Jack, Kento and Terry / "Hamburger"
Voiced by: Takuto Yoshinaga (Jack), Ryūji Yamamoto (Kento) and Reiō Tsuchida (Terry) (Japanese), A.J. Beckles (Jack), Josh Grelle (Kento) and Bryce Papenbrook (Terry) (English)
Three teenage boys from a small Empire town who are the sons of a poor family, a local sorcerer, and the town's mayor, respectively. After discovering a Nekoya door at the bottom of a disused well, they became especially fond of its servings of hamburger, French fries and cola. However, what has come to intrigue them most is the restaurant's multifarious clientele, making them resolve to become adventurers and travel the world once they come of age.
Lydianne / "Chicken Nanban"
A young lamia who was adopted and raised by a half-elf sorcerer until he died of a fever. With her kind reviled by common people, she has lived a lonely life in her father's tower since his death until Jack, Kento and Terry come visiting in search of magical knowledge. Finding them surprisingly accepting of her racial nature, she is invited by them to Nekoya, where she sheds her social anxiety upon seeing so many different beings peacefully interacting with each other, and later joins the trio as a fourth member to their adventuring party.
Hilda / "Soufflé Cheesecake"
Voiced by: Nao Tōyama (Japanese); Trina Nishimura (English)
A renowned solo mercenary and bounty hunter known as the "Night Strider", she is – like Aletta – a demon girl with a cat's enhanced senses. With sweets and confectionaries having been a precious but virtually unobtainable commodity in her childhood, she has come to indulge herself on soufflé cheesecake after coming upon the restaurant.
Alicia "Fembear" and Ranija "Poison Viper"
Voiced by: Sachi Kokuryu (Alicia) and Kaori Nazuka (Ranija) (Japanese), Corinne Sudberg (Alicia) and Xanthe Huynh (English)
Two female demon mercenaries and acquaintances of Hilda. Alicia possesses the forelimbs and strength of a bear, while Ranija, a Sand Nation-born, sports several reptilian features, including gecko-type finger pads and a set of venomous fangs. After they catch Hilda going for a Nekoya door, they end up patrons of the restaurant themselves, each with a personal preference for a different type of cheesecake.
Antonio / "Sweet Potato Tarts"
A priest of the Lord of the Skies from the Southern Continent, who later takes his young son Gustavo to the Nekoya after the latter gains the ability to shapechange into a dragon as well.
Tedd / "Hors d'oeuvre"
A good-natured but opportunistic halfling adventurer who once treated his entire party to a meal of hors d'oeuvre, only to pilfer food from their plates during their meal and get his just desserts.
Thomas the Searcher / "Mont Blanc II"
Voiced by: Ryohei Kimura (Japanese); Brandon Potter (English)
An adventurer, former treasure hunter, and investigator from the Demon Kingdom, he was hired by a noblewoman to seek the source of the Mont Blanc treats her recently deceased head maid, Jazelle – a regular at Nekoya – had periodically provided to her family without revealing where she got them from. After discovering the Nekoya door in a long-abandoned closet only Jazelle had ever made use of, he fulfills his mission but also takes the time to indulge himself on the dessert as well.
Lucia / "Scotch Egg"
Voiced by: Aya Hisakawa (Japanese); Morgan Garrett (English)
A lamia and High Priestess of the "Red Queen's" cult on the Southern Continent who is another regular customer at the Nekoya. Her devotion gives her the ability to transform into a dragon, making her nigh unstoppable in combat.
Emilio
Voiced by: Kōhei Amasaki (Japanese); Clifford Chapin (English)
A novice priest of the Lord of Red's (the "Red Queen") faith notable for his unusually feminine appearance, which brought him the unwanted attention of numerous male admirers. After joining Lucia's temple in her home village and winning her favor, he is invited by her to the Nekoya. It is stated that he would later become a highly potent priest and sire off-spring with Lucia's granddaughters.
Koheiji / "Salt-Grilled Pacific Saury"
A poor merchant from the Mountain Nation who, while being attacked by a wraith, fled through a Nekoya door into the restaurant after hours. After being found by the Master, he is treated to a meal of grilled Pacific saury, and upon tasting it, he vows to return whenever he's got the time.
Johan and Myra / "Macaroni Gratin"
Voiced by: Kentarō Kumagai (Johan) and Ai Kakuma (Myra) (Japanese), Adam McArthur (Johan) and Kristen McGuire (Myra) (English)
A young childhood friend couple. Myra is the daughter of an innkeeper who has been successfully selling "knight sauce" ever since the halflings Pikke and Pakke provided him with the recipe. Johan eventually discovered a Nekoya door in the nearby woods after tracking the halflings who frequented the place, and the following week takes Myra there for lunch, where she becomes very partial to macaroni gratin.
Selena / "Sweet Bean Red Soup"
An over 3,000-year-old elf magician who mastered magic more ancient than the current races inhabiting the other world, making herself immortal, although she is bound to an enchanted forest in order to preserve her agelessness. Despite having no need for food in her current state, she loves visiting the Nekoya for her favorite dish, a Nekoya special served only once a year. She is a friend of Christian, who is the only elf to know of her continued existence.
Glenn and Ignis / "Sausage & Potatoes"
Glenn, a human, and Ignis, a demon, are two Imperial soldiers who have become Nekoya regulars for its sausage and French fries breakfasts.
Graham Beltran / "Seafood Pesto Pasta"
An Imperial knight who is stationed in the same town as Glenn and Ignis. Growing up in a port town, he developed a taste for seafood which he could not satisfy once his knightly duty took him away from the ocean.
Arnold and Elly
An adventurer and his young daughter. While escorting Elly to live with her grandparents after her mother's death, they took shelter from a rainstorm in an abandoned cabin which contained a Nekoya door. After being fed and sheltered by the Master for the night, they resolve to return here once Elly has grown a bit older.
Albert / "Pork Chops"
The third prince of the Demon Kingdom and an accomplished fighter who frequents the Nekoya for its pork chops.
Katalina / "Tiramisu"
A high priestess of the Lord of Light, and the birth mother and minder of the "Child of White", the Lord of Light's chosen one. Because of a past misdemeanour, the Child of White, unable to enter the Nekoya anymore, regularly sends her out to fetch confections from the restaurant.
Camilla / "Fruit Jelly"
Voiced by: Ami Koshimizu (Japanese); Brianna Roberts (English)
A mermaid priestess of the Lord of Seas, who was installed by her deity as an observer for the Demon God's return and for this purpose granted immortality and the ability to change into human form. After sampling fruit jelly at the Nekoya, she has been trying to recreate that treat, although she is still far from perfect.
Lastina
Voiced by: Kana Hanazawa (Japanese); Leah Clark (English)
The current Demon King (or Queen), and the daughter of Demon King Altina, the former ruler of the Demon Kingdom who became a vassal of the Empire under the supervision of Wilhelm's son Wolfgang. Unlike her mother, she was born with underdeveloped demon traits and magic, but is in turn highly intelligent. When the Nekoya door appears inside her dressing room, she has a warm reunion with her old acquaintance Princess Adelheid, who encourages her to play on the strengths she has to be a worthy Demon King.
Hachirou (八郎, Hachirō)
A Mountain Nation native and wandering actor. Abandoned as a little child, he was adopted and raised by a halfling couple. Because of the halfling race's wanderlust, they separated after Hachirou became old enough to take care of himself, but rendezvous in the Nekoya once a year.
Ilzegant / "Green Tea Shaved Ice"
Voiced by: Akeno Watanabe (Japanese); Dallas Reid (English)
A young male elf magician. Centuries ago, when the elf population of the other world was severely decimated by a fatal disease they had imported from Earth during an attempt to colonize it, (Note: These events occurred some time after the Demon God's banishment by the Ancient Six and the rise of the new mortal races. The magic doorbell connecting the Nekoya to the other world was actually created by the elves from that era.) his parents fled the surface and founded a cloud island paradise on which they raised their son. Living his first 250 years in total isolation from the world below, his life undergoes a drastic change once a Nekoya door opens to his domicile, and after getting a first taste of something new (in the form of green tea shaved ice), he is inspired to explore and learn more about the world he is living in.
Edmon / "Carbonara"
Voiced by: Susumu Chiba
Edmon is the Demon Kingdom's Chief of Intelligence who is keeping a very critical eye on the Great Empire's activities, including its budding relationship with the Sand Nation. After discovering a Nekoya door in a research room of his agency, he uses his frequent patronage of the restaurant to keep himself informed on current developments while indulging himself on his habitual order of carbonara. As one of the regulars, he is quite well-informed about the true identities of the more illustrious Nekoya diners.
Elmer
A half-elf, Elmer is a former citizen of the Great Empire, who was celebrated as "the Empire's Proud Shield" for his services to the crown, particularly as a bodyguard to Princess Adelheid's mother and later as an admiral of the Imperial fleet. He was a witness to William's introduction of potatoes ("cobbler's tubers") to the Empire, which turned the arid realm into a prosperous nation. He later emigrated to the Great Duchy, where he became a friend of Alphonse Flügel and is invited to the Nekoya by him.
Ulrich and Soujun / "Chinese Congee"
Soujun, an elder citizen of the Demon Kingdom, once stumbled into the Nekoya after a hefty nocturnal drinking bout. Due to his inebriation, he was unable to remember where he got into the restaurant, and so asked Ulrich, a town guard, to help him find it again. After Ulrich catches Tedd the halfling breaking into Soujun's new house, which actually contains the very Nekoya door Soujun had unwittingly used, the three of them visit the restaurant together and partake in a special serving of the staff meal – Chinese congee – that the Master had made for himself, Aletta and Kuro that night.
Alzas / "Chilli Chicken"
Alzas is a wandering bard who once spent some time with a halfling colleague named Marina who told him about the Restaurant to Another World. After getting his leg severely injured in an accident, he found his way to the Nekoya door Marina had described, where he is healed by Celestina and served a meal to regain his strength.
Paul and Reiner / "Deep-Fried Fish Cakes"
Paul is a veteran garrison soldier of the Demon Kingdom who is raising his young son Reiner after the death of the boy's courtesan mother. Paul once found a Nekoya door during one of his rounds and later invites his son to a meal of fried fish cake at the eatery, which eventually inspires him to retire and return to his parents' life on a farm with Reiner.
Gustaff / "Katsu Sandwich"
A fledgling Demon Kingdom adventurer who once went to explore the City of the Dead, the ruined capitol of the Ancient Kingdom. After breaking his leg upon falling into a pit, he meets the wraith of a fellow unlucky adventurer – William Gold's son Julius – who died near a Nekoya door appearing within the ruins. After being healed and treated to a meal in the restaurant, Gustaff fulfills Julius' final request to bring his sword and journal back to his family.
Adelia / "Spanish Omelet"
A lupine demihuman priestess of the Lord of Earth, one of the Ancient Six. Slightly scatterbrained, she always ends up forgetting something important, particularly before or after visiting Nekoya. She has a younger brother named Carlos, whom she invites to the restaurant during one of his visits.
Alef / "Coffee Jelly"
A Sand Nation sorcerer who enters the Nekoya through a door appearing in a derelict house in the oasis village where he resides.
Salia / "Cabbage Rolls"
A cat-eyed demon woman who became a Nekoya client during Daiki's time.
Sayuki / "Ajillo"
A snow woman from an icy region at the north edge of the Western Continent. Dependent on freezing cold to survive, her kind can only interact with other people during the winter season, when her land's ice spreads southward towards the settled areas. She regularly enters the Nekoya through a door in her frozen domain to partake in the eatery's ajillo dish and the company of the other patrons, wearing insulated clothing to protect herself from the warmth.

== Others ==
The Ancient Six
A group of divine beings who take the shape of great dragons and are worshipped as gods in the other world. Priests and priestesses of sufficient rank and devotion are capable of transforming themselves, wholly or partially, into dragons. Next to "Red Queen" and "Kuro", this group includes:
- Blue (青, Ao), Lord of the Sea
- Gold, Lord of the Skies
- White, Lord of Light who has a special affection for the new mortal races on her world, especially the humans.
- Green, Lord of the Earth
The Demon God
Also known under the name Million Colors of Chaos, it is the creator of all demons. When it began destroying life on the other world over 34,000 years ago, it was defeated by the Ancient Six; in the wake of this event, the current races of the other world – humans, elves etc. – would rise. Seventy years before the series' storyline, the Dark Lord was resurrected by the Demon King, only to be thwarted and banished by the Four Heroes.
Alexander (アレクサンデル, Arekusanderu)
Voiced by: Takahiro Sakurai (Japanese); Micah Solusod (English)
A womanizing half-elf mercenary and sword-master, and one of the legendary Four Heroes. He's described as being sharp-tongued and overconfident, despite having good intentions. After his exploits ended with the defeat of the Demon God, he spent 70 years as a mercenary performing work on commission. One of these jobs involved capturing Lionel and his band of mercenaries. He is also the father of Wilhelm, the founder of the Eastern Continent's Empire, after saving his mother, Princess Adelheid, from her kingdom's conquest at the hands of the Demon King. Their relationship apparently suffered due to Alexander being absent in his sons' life, being away at war while he grew up and missing the death of his lover. Upon visiting the restaurant and trying his son's favorite dish, he decided to visit his son and lover's graves.
Balrog (バルログ, Barurogu)
Voiced by: Masayuki Katō (Japanese); Cris George (English)
The "Red Queen"'s demonic valet, who resides with her in her mountaintop nest. Despite his appearance, he is incredibly polite and reserved.
Shia Gold (シア・ゴールド, Shia Gōrudo)
Voiced by: Sumire Morohoshi (Japanese); Felecia Angelle (English)
Sarah Gold's younger sister who has remained a proper young lady of the upper society, although she cares very much about her older sister and visits her from time to time. She also manages their family's businesses. While she does not visit the Nekoya personally, she comes to enjoy the confections the Master receives from his old pâtissier friend, the Flying Puppy owner, and passes on to Aletta.
Duke (公王, Kouou) and the Duke's Wife (公王の妻, Kouou no Tsuma)
Voiced by: Yoshihisa Kawahara (Duke) and Kanako Sakuragi (Duke's Wife)
The ruling family of the Samanark Grand Duchy, and Victoria's younger brother and sister-in-law, respectively. While the Duke is devoted to his older sister, his wife despises Victoria for her half-elven nature, keeping the peace only because of her husband.
Edmond (エドモンド, Edomondo)
Voiced by: Susumu Chiba (Japanese); Aaron Roberts (English)
Fardania's father, who lost his wife Matilda when Fardania was still young. A doting father to his only child, he hesitatingly tried to prevent his daughter from exploring the world.
"The Child of White"
A ten-year-old, spoiled and imperious boy imbued with the power of the ancient dragon "White", a boon granted to a chosen human child every hundred years. Three years previously, when he first visited the Nekoya and took a liking to the confections offered there, he had attempted to take the Master back to his world, only to be bodily evicted by the "Red Queen" and – like Rat the halfling – thenceforth banned from entering the restaurant. (This incident is also the very reason why the "Red Queen" has become so protective of the Nekoya.) Ever since that time, he regularly sends his mother Katalina to collect selected sweets from Earth
William Gold ("Junior")
William Gold's great-grandson and Sarah Gold's cousin. Like his late great-grandfather, he took up treasure-hunting, but by mishandling a magical teleport device, he was stranded on the other world's Southern Continent for ten years and believed dead by the rest of his family. Following the description of Mariabell's father to a Nekoya door, he is joyously reunited with his cousin in the restaurant.
Mariabell
The daughter of a priest of the "Red Queen" from the Southern Continent, and William Junior's sister-in-law, treasure-hunter disciple, and adventuring companion. It is her late father's diary which leads her and William to Nekoya, where William is reunited with his cousin and can bring back word of his survival.
Leonard
A priest of the Lord of Light, and one of the legenday Four Heroes. He is known to have had a passion for smoking tobacco.
Emperor Wolfgang
Voiced by: Jouji Nakata
The current ruler of the Empire, Wilhelm's son and Adelheid's father.
Melissa / "Cream Stew"
A half-elf adventurer who along with her companions once discovered a door to Nekoya during the previous owner's time. When her party broke up after two of its members married, she resolved to cease visiting the restaurant. However, the old master persuaded her to return for a final meal of fully vegan cream stew dish. After being taken by its deliciousness, and with the encouragement of the old Master, she eventually became the chef of her late father's inn, where her elf bean cream stew has become a favorite to passing elven travellers.
Hannah
A deacon of the Lord of Earth, and the personal servant of Princess Adelheid at her grandfather's estate. For her services, Adelheid brought her some cream puffs from the Flying Puppy, making her privy to the secret of the Nekoya.
Fen
An Ocean Nation sea captain whose ship and crew were grounded on a barren island by a typhoon. However, one of the sailors, Tida, found a Nekoya door on the island and brought back enough pork soup to sustain the crew until the storm had abated the next day. As a result of this incident, and with the details supplied by Tida, Fen has named the previously unnamed place "Nekoya Island".
Loretta Feiston
A mage from the Duchy of Samanark and a friend of its ruler, the Duke, and his older sister Victoria. After a long period of separation, she is reunited with Victoria when they and Heinrich Seeleman are forced to discuss strategies against a rising mothman incursion, during which Heinrich hosts his guests with a helping of Mont Blanc Pudding from Nekoya.
