= Homura Kawamoto =

Japanese manga artist and writer

Homura Kawamoto 河本ほむら
- Area: Manga artist
- Notable works: Kakegurui – Compulsive Gambler; The War of Greedy Witches; Build Divide; High Card; Beyblade X
- Relatives: Hikaru Muno (brother)

Homura Kawamoto (Japanese: 河本ほむら, Hepburn: Kawamoto Homura) is a Japanese manga artist and writer. After publishing manga anonymously, he launched his first series, Kakegurui – Compulsive Gambler, in 2014, which has achieved commercial success. Following Kakegurui – Compulsive Gambler's success, Kawamoto has been involved with many other manga, anime, and video game series, such as The War of Greedy Witches, Cheat Slayer, Build Divide, and High Card.

== Biography ==
Kawamoto began working as a manga artist in 2009, when he began posting manga to the Nitosha manga website under the pen name Gyūnyū (牛乳; "milk"). In 2014, he launched his first series, Kakegurui – Compulsive Gambler, in Gangan Joker. The series has performed well, with over five million copies in print. The series has also received multiple adaptations, notably an anime television series. A spin-off, titled Kakegurui Twin, was launched in 2015.

In 2021, Kawamoto launched Cheat Slayer in Monthly Dragon Age. However, following the release of the first chapter, readers began to notice similarities to other popular series. This eventually lead to Cheat Slayer being canceled after one chapter. Kawamoto later apologized on Twitter.

== Works ==
=== Manga ===
- Kakegurui – Compulsive Gambler (2014–present) (serialized in Gangan Joker; illustrated by Tōru Naomura)
- Kakegurui Twin (2015–present) (serialized in Gangan Joker; illustrated by Kei Saiki)
- Rengoku Deadroll (2015–2017) (serialized in Monthly Dragon Age; illustrated by Hideyaki Yoshimura)
- Isekai Hōtei: Rebuttal Barrister (2016–2018) (serialized in Young Ace; illustrated by Shimomon Ohba)
- Chrono Ma:gia: Mugen no Haguruma (2018–2019) (serialized in Weekly Shōnen Sunday; co-written by Hikaru Muno and illustrated by Takeshi Azuma)
- Legal Egg (2020–2021) (serialized in Evening; illustrated by Yasoko Momen)
- Greatest M: Ijin Mahjong Taisen (2020–present) (serialized in Sunday Webry; co-written by Hikaru Muno and Mika Mizuguchi and illustrated by Shutaro Yamada)
- The War of Greedy Witches (2020–present) (serialized in Monthly Comic Zenon; illustrated by Makoto Shiozuka)
- Cheat Slayer (2021) (serialized in Monthly Dragon Age; illustrated by Aki Yamaguchi)
- Isekai no Hime to no Koi Bakuchi ni, Jinrui no Sonbō ga Kakkatemasu (2021–2023) (serialized in Champion Red; illustrated by Zuzu Kamiya)
- Isekai Executioner: The Serial Killer in Another World (2022-present) (serialized in Young King Lambda; illustrated by Hiro)
- Bakumatsu Tobaku Barbaroi (2022–2023) (serialized in Shōnen Jump+; illustrated by Toyotaka Haneda)
- Porter of Heroes (2022–present) (serialized in Gangan Joker; illustrated by Ryō Yajima)
- Beyblade X (2023–present) (serialized in Monthly CoroCoro Comic; illustrated by Posuka Demizu)
- Bōryoku Banzai (2025–present) (serialized in Weekly Young Magazine, illustrated by Nadainishi)

=== Anime ===
- Build Divide (2021–2022) (co-creator)
- High Card (2023) (co-creator)

=== Games ===
- Yurukill: The Calumniation Games (2022) (writer)
