= MAPPA =

Japanese animation studio

MAPPA Co., Ltd.

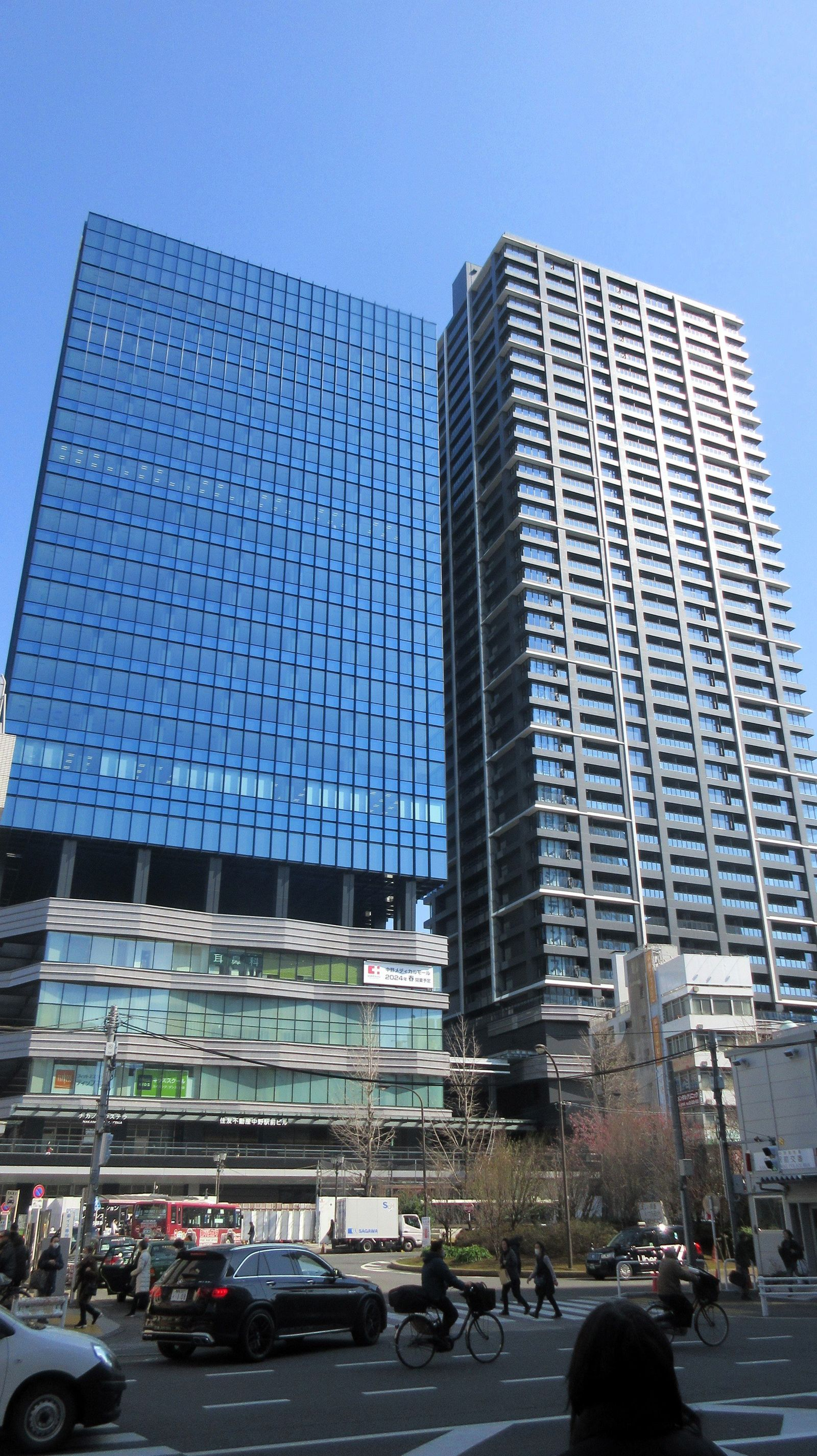
- Headquarters in Nakano, Tokyo
- Native name: 株式会社MAPPA
- Romanized name: Kabushiki-gaisha MAPPA
- Type: Subsidiary KK
- Industry: Japanese animation
- Founded: June 14, 2011; 15 years ago
- Founder: Masao Maruyama
- Headquarters: Nakano, Nakano, Tokyo, Japan
- Key people: Manabu Otsuka (CEO); Masao Maruyama (chairman); Hiroya Hasegawa (executive vice president)
- Products: Animation planning and production
- Number of employees: 562 (as of April 2026)
- Parent: MHD Co., Ltd.
- Divisions: MAPPA Sendai Studio; MAPPA Osaka Studio; Contrail
- Website: mappa.co.jp

MAPPA Co., Ltd. (Japanese: 株式会社MAPPA, Hepburn: Kabushiki-gaisha MAPPA) is a Japanese animation studio headquartered in Nakano, Tokyo. Founded in 2011 at Suginami, Tokyo by Madhouse co-founder and producer Masao Maruyama, it has produced anime television series including Terror in Resonance, Yuri!!! on Ice, Kakegurui, Banana Fish, Zombie Land Saga, Dororo (with Tezuka Productions), Dorohedoro, Jujutsu Kaisen, Attack on Titan (season 4), Vinland Saga (season 2), Chainsaw Man, Hell's Paradise: Jigokuraku, and Ranma ½ (2024). MAPPA is an acronym for Maruyama Animation Produce Project Association.

== Business ==
=== History ===
The studio was established on June 14, 2011, by Masao Maruyama, a co-founder and former producer of Madhouse, at the age of 70. Maruyama served as the company's first representative director, and the studio's initial goal was to produce Sunao Katabuchi's In This Corner of the World. Due to financial difficulties at Madhouse, Maruyama and Katabuchi established MAPPA in the hopes of producing the film; however, despite moving studios, the film had a lot of production troubles, and wasn't released until 5 years later. Maruyama first started working with Katabuchi for the film in 2010 during the Madhouse era, but it took three years to start the production due to difficulties in raising funds.

In April 2016, Maruyama resigned as a CEO of the studio and became a chairman, withdrawing his management position and going on to establish Studio M2 to create Pluto. Leaving the studio in hands of animation producer Manabu Otsuka, a founding member of MAPPA and a former employee of Studio 4°C, who became the CEO following Maruyama's official departure.

In September 2019, Director Sunao Katabuchi established Animation Studio Contrail to produce his next work. While Otsuka serving as the representative director for the same.

In January 2026, MAPPA entered into a strategic partnership with Netflix.

In February 2026, It was announced that Contrail will cease to exist as an separate legal entity and will be acquired by MAPPA. To add, Director Katabuchi said that its just a management shift and they still will be producing under the Contrail name.

On November 11, 2026, MAPPA and CyberAgent have announced that the two companies have established a strategic business alliance. In addition, CyberAgent announced that it has acquired a stake in MAPPA's parent company, MHD.

== Production system ==
In addition to the head office in Nakano, a studio in Sendai was established in April 2018 specializing in in-betweening and finishing and a studio in Osaka in March 2022 that specializes in 3DCGI, to decentralize the excessive concentration of animation production in Tokyo and to bring opportunities for the graduates of the local vocational schools in their own respective region, instead of them having to move to Tokyo.

=== Tokyo Studio ===
The Tokyo studio consists of a production department, CGI department, directing department, animation department, rights department, and planning and development department.

Currently, other than every animation related project being primarily handled here, the head office's rights department is responsible for copyright, illustrations, merchandise, coordination of events and advertisement of related intellectual property. To expand in this area in April 2025, a record label "MAPPA Records" was started with Kensuke Ushio's OST for Chainsaw Man – The Movie: Reze Arc being the first publication under that label.

=== Sendai Studio ===
Opened in April 2018, it was established to build a more stable production base, and to increase the percentage of in-house production, is mainly responsible for the processes of in-between animation and digital painting. There are future plans to establish a CGI section for 3DCG, compositing, and backgrounds.

=== Osaka Studio ===
Opened in 2023, in the center of Osaka city acts as a satellite office of the CGI Department. This studio is primarily staffed by the 3DCG section artists. The studio has future plans to establish other departments such as the CGI Department's background art section, the Animation Department, and the Production Department, with the aim of creating a functional production equivalent to that of Tokyo.

== Productions ==
=== Anime television series ===
Year	Title	Director(s)	Animation producer(s)	Source	Eps.	Refs.
2012	Kids on the Slope (co-produced with Tezuka Productions)	Shinichirō Watanabe	Manabu Otsuka; Masao Morosawa; Sumio Udagawa	Manga	12	
2012	Teekyu	Shin Itagaki	Masashi Tanaka	Manga	12 (Note: Four special episodes were included in the Blu-ray/DVD release.)	
2013	Teekyu 2	Shin Itagaki	Manabu Otsuka	Manga	12 (Note: Two special episodes were included in the Blu-ray/DVD release (volume 2).)	
2013	Teekyu 3	Shin Itagaki	Manabu Otsuka	Manga	12 (Note: Two special episodes were included in the Blu-ray/DVD release (volume 3).)	
2013–2014	Hajime no Ippo: Rising (co-produced with Madhouse)	Jun Shishido	Shintarou Hashimoto; Yasuteru Iwase; Masakazu Watanabe	Manga	25	
2014	Terror in Resonance	Shinichirō Watanabe	Manabu Otsuka	Original work	11	
2014	Rage of Bahamut: Genesis	Keiichi Sato	Manabu Otsuka	Video game	12 (Note: A recap of the first six episodes was aired on November 17, 2014. Two special "short story" episodes were released on December 28, 2016, and February 20, 2017.)	
2014–2015	Garo: The Carved Seal of Flames	Yuichiro Hayashi	Manabu Otsuka	Original work Tokusatsu series	24	
2015	Punch Line	Yutaka Uemura	Manabu Otsuka; Fuuko Noda	Original work	12	
2015	Ushio & Tora (co-produced with Studio VOLN)	Satoshi Nishimura		Manga	26	
2015–2016	Garo: Crimson Moon	Atsushi Wakabayashi		Original work Tokusatsu series	23 (Note: A special episode titled Imprint Butterfly was included in the BD/DVD release.)	
2016	Ushio & Tora Part 2	Satoshi Nishimura		Manga	13	
2016	Days	Kōnosuke Uda	Manabu Otsuka	Manga	24	
2016	Yuri!!! on Ice	Sayo Yamamoto; Jun Shishido (Note: Chief Unit Director (演出チーフ))	Takahiro Ogawa; Fuuko Noda	Original work	12 (Note: A special episode titled Yuri!!! on Ice: Yuri Plisetsky GBF in Barcelona EX "Welcome to the Madness" was included in the BD/DVD release (volume 6).)	
2017	Idol Incidents (co-produced with Studio VOLN)	Daisuke Yoshida		Media-mix project	12	
2017	Rage of Bahamut: Virgin Soul	Keiichi Sato	Katsuhito Masuda	Video game	24	
2017	Kakegurui	Yuichiro Hayashi		Manga	12 (Note: Three special picture drama episodes were included in the BD/DVD release.)	
2017	Altair: A Record of Battles	Kazuhiro Furuhashi	Wataru Kawagoe	Manga	24	
2017	Inuyashiki	Keiichi Sato (Note: Credited as Chief Director (総監督, Sō Kantoku).); Shuhei Yabuta	Katsuhito Masuda	Manga	11	
2017–2018	Garo: Vanishing Line	Sunghoo Park	Takahiro Ogawa; Manabu Otsuka	Original work Tokusatsu series	24	
2018	Banana Fish	Hiroko Utsumi	Manabu Otsuka	Manga	24	
2018	Zombie Land Saga	Munehisa Sakai	Manabu Otsuka	Original work	12	
2019	Dororo (co-produced with Tezuka Productions)	Kazuhiro Furuhashi	Masato Matsunaga	Manga	24	
2019	Kakegurui ××	Yuichiro Hayashi; Kiyoshi Matsuda	Takahiro Ogawa	Manga	12	
2019	Sarazanmai (co-produced with Lapin Track)	Kunihiko Ikuhara; Nobuyuki Takeuchi (Note: Chief Director (チーフディレクター))	Manabu Otsuka; Masakazu Watanabe	Original work	11	
2019	To the Abandoned Sacred Beasts	Jun Shishido	Takahiro Ogawa	Manga	12	
2019	Granblue Fantasy The Animation (season 2)	Yui Umemoto	Masato Matsunaga	Video game	12 (Note: Two special episodes were streamed on March 28, 2020, and August 26, 2020.)	
2020	Uchitama?! Have you seen my Tama? (co-produced with Lapin Track)	Kiyoshi Matsuda	Tooru Kubo; Masakazu Watanabe	Character franchise	11	
2020	Dorohedoro	Yuichiro Hayashi	Fuuko Noda	Manga	12 (Note: Six short bonus episodes were included in the Blu-ray release (volume 2).)	
2020	Listeners	Hiroaki Ando	Takahiro Ogawa	Original work	12	
2020	The God of High School	Sunghoo Park	Tooru Kubo; Wataru Kawagoe	Manhwa	13	
2020	Mr Love: Queen's Choice	Munehisa Sakai	Fuuko Noda	Mobile game visual novel	12	
2020	The Gymnastics Samurai	Hisatoshi Shimizu	Fuuko Noda	Original work	11	
2020–2021	Jujutsu Kaisen	Sunghoo Park	Keisuke Seshimo	Manga	24	
2020–2023	Attack on Titan (season 4)	Yuichiro Hayashi; Jun Shishido	Masato Matsunaga (part 1); Wataru Kawagoe (parts 2–4)	Manga	35 (Note: The season consisted of 28 standard-length episodes followed by two specials, which were later edited into seven additional standard-length episodes.)	(Note: Part 1; Part 2; Part 3; Part 4)
2021	Zombie Land Saga Revenge	Munehisa Sakai	Takahiro Ogawa	Original work	12	
2021	Re-Main	Masafumi Nishida; Kiyoshi Matsuda	Manabu Otsuka	Original work	12	
2021	The Idaten Deities Know Only Peace	Seimei Kidokoro	Fuuko Noda	Manga	11	
2021	Takt Op. Destiny (co-produced with Madhouse)	Yuuki Itoh	Wataru Kawagoe; Yuuichirou Fukushi	Media-mix project	12	
2022	Dance Dance Danseur	Munehisa Sakai	Takahiro Ogawa	Manga	11	
2022	Chainsaw Man	Ryū Nakayama; Makoto Nakazono	Keisuke Seshimo	Manga	12	
2023	Vinland Saga (season 2)	Shūhei Yabuta	Hiroya Hasegawa	Manga	24	
2023	Campfire Cooking in Another World with My Absurd Skill	Kiyoshi Matsuda	Takahiro Ogawa	Light novel	12	
2023	Hell's Paradise	Kaori Makita	Wataru Kawagoe	Manga	13	
2023	Jujutsu Kaisen (season 2)	Shōta Goshozono	Keisuke Seshimo	Manga	23	
2024	Bucchigiri?!	Hiroko Utsumi	Takahiro Ogawa	Original work	12	
2024	Oblivion Battery	Masato Nakazono	Hiroya Hasegawa; Kouya Okamura	Manga	12	
2024	Ranma ½	Kōnosuke Uda	Kouya Okamura	Manga	12	
2025	Zenshu	Mitsue Yamazaki	Takahiro Ogawa	Original work	12	
2025	Lazarus (co-produced with Sola Entertainment)	Shinichirō Watanabe	Masato Matsunaga	Original work	13	
2025	Campfire Cooking in Another World with My Absurd Skill (season 2)	Kiyoshi Matsuda	Kodai Kato	Light novel	12	
2025	Ranma ½ (season 2)	Kōnosuke Uda	Kouya Okamura	Manga	12	
2026	Jujutsu Kaisen (season 3)	Shōta Goshozono	Keisuke Seshimo; Riku Nihonyanagi	Manga	12	
2026	Hell's Paradise (season 2)	Kaori Makita	Wataru Kawagoe	Manga	12	
2026	Ranma ½ (season 3)	Kōnosuke Uda	Kouya Okamura	Manga	TBA	
2027	Oblivion Battery (season 2)	Masato Nakazono	TBA	Manga	TBA	
2027	Fall in Love, You False Angels	Yasutomo Okamoto	Yuriko Waki	Manga	TBA	
TBA	Chainsaw Man: Assassins Arc	Tatsuya Yoshihara	TBA	Manga	TBA	
TBA	Jujutsu Kaisen (season 4)	Shōta Goshozono; Takeru Satō	TBA	Manga	TBA	

=== Anime films ===
Year	Title	Director(s)	Animation producer(s)	Source	Refs.
2016	Garo: Divine Flame	Yuichiro Hayashi	Manabu Otsuka; Takahiro Ogawa	Original work Tokusatsu series	
2016	In This Corner of the World	Sunao Katabuchi	Ryoichiro Matsuo	Manga	
2019	In This Corner (and Other Corners) of the World (Note: An extended version of In This Corner of the World featuring about 30 minutes of additional footage for a total duration of 168 minutes. It surpassed the extended 70mm cut of Final Yamato by five minutes to become the longest animated film to date.)	Sunao Katabuchi	Ryoichiro Matsuo	Manga	
2021	Jujutsu Kaisen 0	Sunghoo Park	Keisuke Seshimo	Manga	
2022	A Girl Meets a Boy and a Robot	Shinichiro Watanabe	Masato Matsunaga	Original work (Note: Part of the Chinese Anthology TAISU project.)	
2023	Maboroshi	Mari Okada; Seimei Kidokoro	Fuuko Noda; Ryouta Kitsunai	Original work	
2024	Attack on Titan The Movie: The Last Attack	Yuichiro Hayashi	Wataru Kawagoe	Manga	
2024	Gekijōban Inazuma Eleven: Aratanaru Eiyū-tachi no Joshō	Akihiro Hino; Shuhei Yabuta	Yuriko Waki	Video game	
2025	The Rose of Versailles	Ai Yoshimura	Wataru Kawagoe; Fuuko Noda	Manga	
2025	Jujutsu Kaisen: Hidden Inventory / Premature Death – The Movie	Shōta Goshozono	Keisuke Seshimo	Manga	
2025	Chainsaw Man – The Movie: Reze Arc	Tatsuya Yoshihara	Keisuke Seshimo (non-credited)	Manga	
2025	Zombie Land Saga: Yumeginga Paradise	Kōnosuke Uda; Takeru Sato; Takafumi Ishida	Yuriko Waki	Original work	

=== Original video animations (OVAs) ===
Year	Title	Director(s)	Animation producer(s)	Source	Eps.	Refs.
2017	Days: OVA	Kōnosuke Uda		Manga	2	
2017	Onihei: Sono Otoko, Hasegawa Heizou	Shigeyuki Miya		Manga	1	
2018	Days: Touin Gakuen-sen!	Kōnosuke Uda		Manga	3	

=== Original net animations (ONAs) ===
Year	Title	Director(s)	Animation producer(s)	Source	Eps.	Refs.
2012–2015	Komachi and Dangorō	Hisashi Abe		Original work	4	
2020	Oblivion Battery	Parako Shinohara	Ayako Sekine	Manga	1	
2021	Yasuke	LeSean Thomas; Takeru Sato	Takahiro Ogawa	Original work	6	
2022	Kakegurui Twin	Yuichiro Hayashi; Kaori Makita	Takahiro Ogawa	Manga	6	
2026	Dorohedoro (season 2)	Yuichiro Hayashi	Kouya Okamura	Manga	11	
2027	Beat & Motion	Yuki Komada	Takahiro Ogawa	Manga	TBA	
TBA	Dorohedoro (season 3)	TBA	TBA	Manga	TBA	
TBA	Jimoto Saiko!	Tokio Igarashi	Takahiro Ogawa	Manga	TBA	

=== Music videos (MVs) ===
Year	Title	Director(s)	Animation producer(s)	Artist(s)	Notes	Refs.
2013	Hana wa Saku	Sunao Katabuchi	Manabu Otsuka	Yoko Kanno	The theme for NHK's Great Eastern Japan Earthquake Project	
2015	Korekarasaki, Nando Anata to.	Sunao Katabuchi	Ryoichiro Matsuo	Mishmash; Aimee Isobe		
2018	Nanatsuiro REALiZE	Munehisa Sakai	Katsuhito Masuda	IDOLiSH7		
2021	Oretachi Maji-kō Destroy					
2023	Seventeen	Parako Shinohara	Ayako Sekine	YOASOBI	Produced by Contrail	
2024	Like the Flatwoods Monster	Satomi Maiya	Ryo Oikawa	Eve; Deu		
2024	Lucky	Kyohei Ishiguro	Ayako Sekine	Nulbarich; Sunny; UMI	Co-produced with Contrail	

=== Video games ===
Year	Title	Director(s)	Animation producer(s)	Publisher	Notes	Refs.
2019	Persona 5 Royal	Yuichiro Hayashi		Atlus	Opening animation	
2022	Jujutsu Kaisen: Phantom Parade	Takuji Miyamoto	Keisuke Seshimo	Toho Games	Opening animation	
2024	Emio – The Smiling Man: Famicom Detective Club	Kyōhei Ishiguro	Ayako Sekine	Nintendo	Cutscene in Minoru: Famicom Detective Club, co-produced with Contrail	
2025	Inazuma Eleven: Victory Road	Shūhei Yabuta	Yuriko Waki	Level-5	Opening animation and cutscenes	
2025	Ark: Survival Ascended			Studio Wildcard	Lost Colony DLC	
2026	Attack on Titan 3	Arifumi Imai		Koei Tecmo	Opening animation	
2027	Persona 4 Revival			Atlus	Opening animation and cutscenes	

=== Other productions ===
- Sex: Prologue (OVA, 2018) – promotional video for the 30th anniversary of manga Sex by Atsushi Kamijo; directed by Sayo Yamamoto
- Kick-Flight Promotional Video; Kick-Flight × KANA-BOON (ONA, 2019) – promotional video for the mobile game Kick-Flight, featuring the song "Flyers" by Kana-Boon; directed by Munehisa Sakai
- Mechronicle (unknown, TBA) – directed by Shinji Kimura
- Honkai: Star Rail Animation Concept Trailer (ONA, 2026) – concept trailer titled "Death in the Afternoon", co-produced with HoYoverse; directed by Yuzuru Tachikawa, character design by Kayoko Ishikawa

=== Cancelled projects ===
- Dreaming Machine (film) – cancelled film, originally directed by Satoshi Kon and taken over by Yoshimi Itazu after Kon's death; planned co-production with Madhouse
- Yuri!!! On Ice: Ice Adolescence (film) – cancelled film to be directed by Sayo Yamamoto and announced in 2017 before being delayed in 2019 and in production hell for several years. The film was cancelled in April 2024.

== Notable staff ==
=== Representative staff ===
- Masao Maruyama (founder, first president (2011~2016), board chairman since 2016)
- Manabu Otsuka (second president since 2016)
- Wataru Kawagoe (animation producer; MAPPA Sendai representative)
- Makoto Kimura (board member, 2018~2024)
- Hiroya Hasegawa (animation producer; executive vice president since 2024)
- Yasuteru Iwase (former animation producer; board director, 2024~2025)
- Yuusuke Tannawa (board member since 2024)
- Shuuhei Yabuta (board member since 2024)
- Kousuke Hosokai (board member, 2024~2026)
- Yuuichi Fukushima (executive vice president at CloverWorks; external board member since 2025)
- Keisuke Seshimo (animation producer, 2018~; executive officer, 2024~2026)
- Motoi Okunou (executive officer since 2025)
- Eiji Matsuo (chief rights officer, 2024~2026)

=== Animation producers ===
- Fuuko Noda (2015~2025)
- Tooru Kubo (2015~2021)
- Takahiro Ogawa (2016~present)
- Katsuhito Masuda (2017~2018)
- Masakazu Watanabe (2019~2020; co-founder of Lapin Track)
- Masato Matsunaga (2019~present)
- Ryouta Kitsunai (2023; director)
- Kouya Okamura (2023~present)
- Ryou Ooigawa (2024~present)
- Yuriko Waki (2024~present)
- Koudai Katou (2025~present)
- Makoto Arakawa (2025~present)
- Riku Nihonyanagi (2025~present)

=== Directors ===
- Munehisa Sakai (2017~2022)

=== Animators ===
- Tadashi Hiramatsu (2018~present)

== Controversies ==
The studio's scheduling, work, and culture have been the subject of scrutiny by industry creators and critics. Veteran animator Hisashi Eguchi criticized the studio's low pay. Mushiyo, another animator at MAPPA, also criticized the company for not properly training its animators and the studio's culture of overwork, which led to them eventually quitting their job at the studio. Besides the animator's individual output within the studio, they also criticized the company's decision to produce four series concurrently. Kevin Cirugeda from Sakugablog suggested the problems were due to the studio's incredibly fast-paced growth and "recklessness".

MAPPA denied offering "unreasonable compensation" to "creators" in a response to claims that the studio underpaid workers; however, animator Ippei Ichii claimed that an anime produced by MAPPA under Netflix was suggesting a pay of ¥3,800 per cut, to which Ichii claimed that ¥15,000 is the minimum cost that animators should negotiate for.

== See also ==
- List of Japanese animation studios
- Grizzly, an animation studio specialized solely on BL titles
