= Jimoto Saiko! =

Japanese manga series

- Cover of the first volume, featuring Chanel

地元最高! (Jimoto Saikō!)
- Genre: Dark comedy, stoner comedy, slice of life
- Manga
- Written by: Usagi
- Published by: Saizusha
- Original run: February 28, 2021 – present
- Volumes: 8
- Original net animation
- Directed by: Tokio Igarashi
- Written by: Ryō Takada
- Studio: MAPPA
- Licensed by: Netflix

Jimoto Saiko! (Japanese: 地元最高!, Hepburn: Jimoto Saikō!; lit. "My Hometown is the Best!") is a Japanese web manga series written and illustrated by Usagi. It began serialization on Usagi's X account in February 2021, with Saizusha compiling it into eight volumes as of August 2025. An original net anime (ONA) adaptation produced by MAPPA has been announced and is set to premiere worldwide on Netflix.

== Premise ==
The series follows the daily lives of girls living in their hometown, with each girl facing their issues and having their own quirks, such as being smokers or taking drugs. Their hometown itself has a seedy reputation, with crime and drug use among other issues rampant. Chanel and her friend Chihiro learn to live with their environment, including becoming involved in the world of crime through working for the criminal group leader Kurea. Despite their hometown's issues, the girls love living there, seeing life there as the best.

== Characters ==
Chanel (シャネル, Shaneru)
A twintailed girl who lives with her mother and sister. They live in a run-down apartment, with her mother having a boyfriend.
Chihiro (ちひろ)
Chanel's friend.
Saki
A member of Shizuka's group
Kurea (紅麗亞, Kureia)
The leader of the Kurea Group, which Chanel starts working with. She is a cat lover.
Shizuka (しづか)
The leader of the Shizuka Group, she is a yakuza and Kurea's rival. Age: 17

== Development ==
Usagi originally began posting a web manga about cute girls living in an impoverished town on X (then known as Twitter) in February 2021. Shinya Kusaka, the series' editor, had previously collaborated with Usagi on crime books published by the company Saizusha. After Kusaka saw Usagi post two chapters of the manga, he was impressed by her work and offered to become her editor. After she accepted, he started working on the series from the sixth chapter.

Usagi had been inspired to create the series after noticing that slice of life series tended to focus on happy lives and cheerful girls, and wanted to create a series that instead focused on the more impoverished parts of society. The series was inspired by her own upbringing in a stagnant rural town, with several chapters being based on real-life events.

== Media ==
=== Manga ===
The series is written and illustrated by Usagi, who began serializing it on her X account on February 28, 2021. Saizusha later began compiling the chapters into volumes, releasing the first volume on August 25, 2022. Eight volumes have been released as of August 25, 2025.

No.	Release date	ISBN
1	August 25, 2022	978-4-8013-0609-7
2	February 20, 2023	978-4-8013-0644-8
3	June 23, 2023	978-4-8013-0671-4
4	November 24, 2023	978-4-8013-0695-0
5	April 11, 2024	978-4-8013-0714-8
6	August 23, 2024	978-4-8013-0735-3
7	January 24, 2025	978-4-8013-0760-5
8	August 25, 2025	978-4-8013-0785-8

=== Anime ===
An original net anime (ONA) adaptation was announced during the "MAPPA 15th Anniversary Lineup Reveal" livestream event on June 19, 2026. It is produced by MAPPA and directed by Tokio Igarashi, and features scripts by Ryō Takada and character designs by Rio. The series is set to premiere worldwide on Netflix. The 2009 song "Milk" performed by Aiko was used in the series' teaser trailer.

=== Other ===
The series collaborated with the retail chain Don Quijote in 2024, with merchandise being sold at the chain's stores.
