= Kakegurui (2017 TV series) =

Japanese anime television series

- Anime key visual

賭ケグルイ
- Genre: Gambling; Psychological thriller
- Anime television series
- Directed by: Yuichiro Hayashi
- Written by: Yasuko Kobayashi
- Music by: Technoboys Pulcraft Green-Fund
- Studio: MAPPA
- Licensed by: Netflix (Note: Bang Zoom! English dub rights, streaming rights.); BI: Anime Limited; NA: Sentai Filmworks (Note: Sentai Studios English dub rights, home video rights via Section23 Films.)
- Original network: Tokyo MX, MBS, BS11, RKB, TVA
- Original run: July 1, 2017 – September 23, 2017
- Episodes: 12
- Anime television series

Kakegurui ××
- Directed by: Yuichiro Hayashi; Kiyoshi Matsuda
- Written by: Yasuko Kobayashi
- Music by: Technoboys Pulcraft Green-Fund
- Studio: MAPPA
- Licensed by: Netflix; NA: Sentai Filmworks
- Original network: MBS, TVA, Tokyo MX, RKB, BS NTV
- Original run: January 8, 2019 – March 26, 2019
- Episodes: 12
- icon

Kakegurui (Japanese: 賭ケグルイ) is a Japanese anime television series adapted from the manga series of the same name written by Homura Kawamoto and illustrated by Tōru Naomura. The anime television series is animated by MAPPA. It aired from July to September 2017 on Tokyo MX, MBS and other channels. A second season titled Kakegurui ×× aired from January to March 2019. The cast reprised their roles, and the staff returned for the second season. Netflix began streaming the series in 2018 and a spin-off series, titled Kakegurui Twin aired in August 2022.

== Release ==
=== First season release ===
The first 12-episode season was broadcast from July 1 to September 23, 2017, on Tokyo MX, MBS and other channels. Yuichiro Hayashi directed the series, Yasuko Kobayashi handled the scripts, and Manabu Akita handled the character designs. Technoboys Pulcraft Green-Fund composed the music for the series. The opening theme is "Deal with the Devil", performed by Tia. D-Selections performed the ending theme "LAYon-theLINE".

The first season has been licensed and streamed worldwide outside of Japan by Netflix since 2018. Anime Limited acquired the series for home video release in the United Kingdom and Ireland. Sentai Filmworks acquired the series for release on home video in the United States.

=== Second season release ===
In August 2018, it was announced that a second season would debut in January 2019. The 12-episode season, titled Kakegurui ××, aired from January 8 to March 26, 2019. The cast reprised their roles, and the staff returned for the second season. Kiyoshi Matsuda joined Yuichiro Hayashi as director for the second season. For the second season, Yasuko Kobayashi and Manabu Akita served respectively as writer and character designer, with MAPPA handling animation for the second season as well. The second season's opening theme song is "Kono Yubi Tomare" (コノユビトマレ) performed by JUNNA, while the ending theme is "AlegriA" performed by D-selections.

Kakegurui ×× has also been licensed by Netflix.

== Cast ==
Character	Japanese	English	
Character	Japanese	Netflix via Bang Zoom! (2018)	Sentai Filmworks (2021)
Yumeko Jabami	Saori Hayami	Erika Harlacher	Estelle Link
Kirari Momobami	Miyuki Sawashiro	Michelle Ruff	Olivia Swasey
Mary Saotome	Minami Tanaka	Kira Buckland	Christina Kelly
Ryōta Suzui	Tatsuya Tokutake	Griffin Burns	Adam Gibbs
Itsuki Sumeragi	Yuki Wakai	Erica Mendez	Cat Thomas
Yuriko Nishinotōin	Karin Nanami	Cristina Vee	Genevieve Simmons
Midari Ikishima	Mariya Ise	Sarah Anne Williams	Natalie Rial
Yumemi Yumemite	Yū Serizawa	Faye Mata	Maggie Flecknoe
Kaede Manyūda	Tomokazu Sugita	Chris Niosi	Scott Gibbs
Runa Yomozuki	Mayu Udono	Kayli Mills	Brittney Karbowski
Sayaka Igarashi	Ayaka Fukuhara	Erica Lindbeck	Melissa Molano
Miloslava Honebami	Mitsuki Saiga	Allegra Clark	Marissa Lenti
Ibara Obami	Yoshimasa Hosoya	Joe Zieja	Eric Vale

== Episodes ==
=== Kakegurui ===
No. overall	No. in season	Title	Directed by	Written by	Original air date
1	1	"A Woman Named Yumeko Jabami"; Transliteration: "Jabami Yumeko to Iu Onna" (Japanese: 蛇喰夢子という女)	Yūichirō Hayashi	Yasuko Kobayashi	July 1, 2017
Hyakkaou Private Academy is one of Japan's most prestigious schools, where only the rich can enter. However, unlike normal schools, this one is run entirely by the Student Council and possesses a frightening hierarchy determined by gambling. The best gamblers enjoy popularity, money, and authority, while those in debt are deemed Pets and servants to the student body. Yumeko Jabami, a mysterious second-year transfer student, arrives and is introduced to the school by Ryota Suzui, a student who is now a Pet after having lost a gamble to Mary Saotome, their class's best gambler. Mary challenges Yumeko to a modified rock-paper-scissors game: (Jankenpon). Although Yumeko loses, she requests a final bet worth 10 million yen in cash, and reveals how Mary had manipulated the classmates' votes to allow her to determine Yumeko's cards. Yumeko mocks Mary for giving away her methods and wins the game, placing Mary into debt. Yumeko gifts Ryota some of her winnings as thanks for adding to the thrill of the game and considers him her friend.
2	2	"A Boring Woman"; Transliteration: "Tsumannai Onna" (Japanese: つまんない女)	Takashi Kobayashi	Yasuko Kobayashi	July 8, 2017
Following her loss, Mary becomes a Pet. Yumeko is challenged to a Double Concentration game by Itsuki Sumeragi, the daughter of the CEO of Japan's top toy company and a first-year member of the Student Council, famed for having never lost at a card game before. For this gamble, Itsuki uses two decks of cards made by her father's company and wins 20 million yen from Yumeko in a close match. Despite Yumeko not having enough money, Itsuki decides to accept her request for a second round under the condition that if Yumeko loses, Itsuki can have her fingernails and toenails removed to add to her extensive nail collection. Itsuki deals from the same two decks, confident that her cheating style of using heat-activated patterns in the cards will help her win again. However, Yumeko reveals to have picked up on her scheme and used her intellect to memorise the cards, winning the game and remarking that Itsuki would have won had she used a new deck.
3	3	"Slit-Eyed Woman"; Transliteration: "Itome no Onna" (Japanese: 糸目の女)	Shigeru Ueda	Yasuko Kobayashi	July 15, 2017
Yumeko is invited to the Traditional Culture Research Society's clubroom just in time to witness Mary lose a high-stakes bet, adding 40 million yen to her debt. Yuriko Nishinotōin, Mary's opponent, a Student Council member and president of the Culture Club, challenges Yumeko to the Life or Death game. After the first game ends in a draw, Yumeko deduces that Yuriko has been cheating by having the dealer wear magnets on her hand to affect the movement of the swords. Just as Yuriko becomes panicked over the thought of potentially losing over 2 billion yen, Student Council members, including Council President Kirari Momobami, step in to observe the game. Yuriko wins, which Yumeko suspects may have been the result of an elaborate cheating method the Student Council used for their game, by heading to the room underneath and using magnets to prevent her from winning. Now 310 million yen in debt, Yumeko ends up being classed as a Pet too.
4	4	"The Woman Who Became Livestock"; Transliteration: "Kachiku ni Natta Onna" (Japanese: 家畜になった女)	Kazuki Ōhashi	Hiroshi Seko	July 22, 2017
Yumeko and Mary receive "Life Schedules" from the Student Council, which dictate their entire futures, including which career they will have, who they will marry and even how many children they will have if they do not clear their debts. With the increasing numbers of Pets, the Student Council announces a Debt Exchange Game, in which groups of four students play a game of two-card Indian poker to try and exchange their debts, with the winner losing their debt completely and even standing a chance to win money. Yumeko and Mary end up in the same group with Jun Kiwatari, a delinquent male student, and another Pet named Nanami Tsubomi. Despite Jun not having any debts, he enters a relatively small 10 million yen debt to use the game to make a profit. Jun appears to deduce that Yumeko and Mary are working together, only to wind up landing into a bluff play by Mary.
5	5	"The Woman Who Became Human"; Transliteration: "Ningen ni Natta Onna" (Japanese: 人間になった女)	Yasunori Gotō	Hiroshi Seko	July 29, 2017
Jun is put under pressure as Yumeko and Mary deduce he is forcing Nanami to cheat for him. With the game now a battle of bluffs, Jun is desperate as he stands to obtain a large debt if he doesn't end up first. He manages to move up but becomes panicked when Nanami gets a chance to overtake him, and tries to coerce her into folding. Yumeko convinces Nanami to stand up for herself and Nanami rebels against Jun's orders. In the end, Mary ends up first place while Jun ends up last, as it is revealed that Yumeko and Mary had switched the debts they had with each other, making Yumeko's of least value instead. As a result, Jun ends up with Yumeko's 310 million debt, Yumeko obtains Mary's 50 million debt and Mary's debt is cleared, while Nanami is left with the same debt she started with, but with a new sense of freedom and self-esteem.
6	6	"Inviting Woman"; Transliteration: "Sasou Onna" (Japanese: 誘う女)	Takashi Kobayashi	Yasuko Kobayashi	August 12, 2017 (Note: Only on MBS episodes 6 and 7 aired on August 19 and August 20, 2017 due to the broadcast of the World Championship in Athletics. As regular broadcast continued on other networks.)
Despite having enough money, Yumeko still has not paid her debt, making the Student Council conclude that she wants to challenge Kirari to a match. Midari Ikishima, a deranged Student Council member, challenges Yumeko to a guessing game; the winner of each round gets to point one of two revolvers at the loser and pull the trigger, with neither knowing which of the guns' six chambers contain a bullet. Despite the possibility of losing her life, Yumeko agrees but only under the conditions that the game only last 3 rounds, Ryota must be the dealer, and the loser must pay 1 billion yen. Midari adds that should the winner miss her shot on purpose, the loser can fire a shot in return. Midari fully loads her gun, and scores higher in the first round. Yumeko warns her that pulling the trigger is a bad idea but Midari ignores her.
7	7	"Refusing Women"; Transliteration: "Kyozetsu-suru Onna-tachi" (Japanese: 拒絶する女たち)	Kōichirō Kuroda	Yasuko Kobayashi	August 19, 2017
Midari doesn't hesitate to shoot but the gun is Yumeko's and it is unloaded. Midari reveals that gambling with money makes her feel nothing; she poked her own left eye out as payment for losing against the Council President and realized she only likes gambling when the risk is pain or death. In the second round, Yumeko correctly matches every card as Ryota simply uses her card order from round one. In the final round, Midari puts Ryota under pressure by reversing the screen and giving him ten seconds; he deals the cards in the same order again. Having figured out the cheating (Ryota is right-handed but was somehow dealing with his left), Yumeko loads two bullets. As Midari wants to be shot, she aims to get no matches, knowing that with a full match, Yumeko has to pull the trigger five times, guaranteeing at least one shot, but Yumeko ruins her plan by getting no matches too, resulting in a draw. Yumeko finds playing with no risk boring and despises Midari for it. Defeated, Midari begs Yumeko to shoot her, but she refuses. Meanwhile, Mary refuses to join the council and swears revenge on Kirari.
8	8	"Id♡l Woman"; Transliteration: "Aidoru Onna" (Japanese: 愛踊(あいど)る女)	Yasunori Gotō	Shigeru Murakoshi	August 26, 2017
Kirari departs from the academy, leaving the rest of the Council unsure how to deal with Yumeko and letting the second-years Kaede Manyuda and Yumemi Yumemite take advantage of the situation to increase their authority. As Itsuki, who is in danger of being disowned by her father after her loss to Yumeko, offers to become loyal to her should she defeat Kirari, become the President and return her her place on the Council, a challenge letter from Yumemi arrives. As the head of PR and a YourTube Japanese idol, Yumemi bets Yumeko 50 million yen on the outcome of an on-stage idol championship competition where should Yumeko lose, Yumemi will alter her life schedule to force her into an idol duo with her, losing any hopes she has of a social life or meaningful relationships, much like Yumemi's own life. Yumeko tricks Yumemi into admitting her real thoughts that her fans are all disgusting pigs on a recording device and adds it to the bet. If Yumemi loses Yumeko will then release the tape and destroy her career along with her hopes for becoming a Hollywood actress.
9	9	"St☆rry-Eyed Woman"; Transliteration: "Yumemiru Onna" (Japanese: 夢見る女)	Kōnosuke Uda	Shigeru Murakoshi	September 2, 2017
Yumemi invites everyone to witness the gamble, which will take place after her in-school concert arranged by Kaede. Yumeko and Yumemi play games designed to test idol skills, such as dancing and singing, where Yumemi allows Yumeko to win several games so there appears to be a risk she will lose. For the final game they have to guess the birth month of members of the audience, and is crucial in that should Yumeko lose this game she loses the entire gamble. Yumemi, having memorised the birthdays of her entire fan club, is confident of her win, but panics when Yumeko manipulates dice and the audience member chosen is Mary. Yumeko tricks Yumemi into writing '9' on her card when she wrote '6', initially scaring her, but when Mary's birthday is revealed to be in March instead, Yumeko wins the game by her guess being 3 months closer, winning the entire game. The recording is played, but even so, Yumemi's fans still remain loyal to her. Yumeko, pleased at Yumemi's conviction, reveals that someone had attempted to sabotage Yumemi's career by sending her a ripped-up fan letter along with the challenge match prior. Yumemi then publicly accuses Kaede, who is the only plausible option for running the match with her. As Kaede denies any wrongdoing and announces his plans as the next President, Yumeko suggests they gamble to decide who is lying, declaring it an official match which he is not allowed to refuse.
10	10	"Deciding Woman"; Transliteration: "Sentaku suru Onna" (Japanese: 選択する女)	Yasunori Gotō	Hiroshi Seko	September 9, 2017
Kirari attends a meeting with the heads of her extended family, all members of the Momobami clan. Back on stage, Kaede becomes convinced that Yumeko is simply a gambling addict who gambles for the thrill of it. The masked vice-president Ririka suggests a genre of modified Poker where no player is allowed to fold or call and the last player who raises can decide whether a stronger or weaker hand wins, meaning each round will have a winner, and insists on being the dealer. Like regular Poker, each player may discard and replace any number of cards once before betting. Yumeko uses her 310 million to 31 poker chips while Kaede buys a 100 for 1 billion. Yumeko wins the first round causing Kaede to factor in her love of risk-taking and uses his keen calculations and intellect to win the subsequent rounds. Yumeko is given the option to continue playing (rebuy) and calls out to Itsuki in the audience for money. Kaede insults her but offers her Council seat back, prompting Yumeko to defend Itsuki as her friend and urges her to take a risk for the sake of her ambitions, rather than accept her seat back from Kaede as the safe way. Mustering her resolve, Itsuki buys Yumeko 100 chips.
11	11	"The Woman Who Bets Her Life"; Transliteration: "Jinsei o kakeru Onna" (Japanese: 人生を賭ける女)	Nobuyoshi Arai	Hiroshi Seko	September 16, 2017
Kirari announces she will no longer support the other family heads, much to their horror. The next hand, Yumeko and Kaede keep betting until Yumeko runs out of chips again, however, the two continue to buy more chips until Kaede raises by 100 chips to force her to stop from lack of money. Yumeko suggests Itsuki bet her life, i.e. to receive a Life Schedule, and although she refuses at first but after seeing Yumeko's cards she rips out her own fingernails and willingly bets her life. Based on Itsuki's family wealth Ririka declares her Life Schedule to be worth 10 billion, prompting to Kaede challenge the decision. Ririka then removes her mask, revealing she is actually Kirari in disguise and that the two are twins. With Yumeko's bet now totalling 12 billion Kaede desperately bets his own Life Schedule for 10 billion and chooses strong. However, Yumeko reveals Itsuki's desperation was a plot to deceive Kaede into choosing strong and reveals she has three jacks, beating Kaede's three eights. Kaede ends up billions in debt and loses his Council seat. Yumeko and Kirari sit down to discuss their reasons for gambling, with both of them appearing to have some sort of attraction to each other. The two finally face each other in a gambling match.
12	12	"Gambling Woman"; Transliteration: "Kakegurui no Onna" (Japanese: 賭ケグルイの女)	Yūichirō Hayashi	Yasuko Kobayashi	September 23, 2017
Council Member Runa Yomozuki acts as judge the match between Yumeko and Kirari, with the loser to be expelled. Kirari chooses the Tarot Cards of Fate game. Yumeko picks a card and gains 1 point. Kirari picks a 21 point card facing away from Yumeko, meaning Yumeko must score 20 points or that Ryota has to locate the Fool card facing Yumeko. Sumeragi and Mary believe a card with a lipstick smudge is the Fool. Although Yumeko says she is the only one with the risk of expulsion, Ryota vows to share her fate to be with her. Ryota is tempted to pick the marked card, but changes his mind at the last second suspecting that it is a ploy by Kirari, and eventually chooses totally at random, the risk factor arousing Yumeko intensely. The chosen card is worth 20 points, thus equalling Kirari's score. The game ends with Runa declares the match a draw and no one having to be expelled, but Kirari and Yumeko agree to gamble again in the future. In a closing dialogue, Ryota sums up how Yumeko has affected everybody she gambled with. Kirari decides to dissolve the student council and Yumeko continues to be a Compulsive Gambler.

=== Kakegurui ×× ===
No. overall	No. in season	Title	Directed by	Written by	Original air date
13	1	"Gambling Women Again"; Transliteration: "Futatabi kakeguru'u onna-tachi" (Japanese: 再ビ賭ケ狂ウ女タチ)	Kiyoshi Matsuda	Yasuko Kobayashi	January 8, 2019
Erimi Mushibami offers Yumeko Jabami and Midari Ikishima an opportunity to gamble in the Finger Cutting Guillotine game, presided over by monitor Inaho Yamato. They relish the challenge but Ryota thinks the idea is crazy and even Erimi thinks they underestimate the risk they are taking as she has the system rigged so that her finger will be safe. The impatient Midari goes first, then Yumeko and then Midari cuts a string, but the guillotine fails to fall. Erimi explains that it is a torture machine of her family who use it to extract information. During the second round, Yumeko questions Yamato about the setup, causing Erimi to fear that her finger may also be in danger. With 6 strings cut, the third round commences, and after Midari and Yumeko cut 2 more, the risk increases, causing Erimi even more distress. Sometime before, Kirari introduces new members to the Student Council; Terano and Yumi Totobami, Sumika Warakubami, Miyo Inbami, Miroslava Honebami, Nozomi Komabami, Rin and Ibara Obami, Miri Yobami, Erimi Mushibami and Rei Batsubami who are all part of the Momobami clan.
14	2	"The Women of Momobami Clan"; Transliteration: "Momobami Ichizoku no Onna-tachi" (Japanese: 百喰一族の女たち)	Norihito Takahashi	Yasuko Kobayashi	January 15, 2019
The Momobami clan announce their intention to win the election and take over the Hyakkaou Academy which will be decided over 30 days by gambling. Each student will start with 1 gambling chip counting as a vote. Meanwhile, Mary warns Yumeko to be careful, even though she appears to be a distant relative the Momobami clan. Terano sees Yumeko as a minor threat and decides to eliminate her early, so Erimi invites Yumeko and Midari to the guillotine gamble which takes place in the previous episode. As the Finger Cutting Guillotine game continues, Erimi panics even more as each string is cut, fearing the game is no longer rigged. Yumeko revels in the psychological torture created by the Mushibami family's game. When only 2 strings are left, Midari cuts both strings and Erimi withdraws her finger as the guillotine falls. However, the machine is still rigged and Yumeko and Midari are unharmed. Erimi loses for withdrawing her finger and Midari is disqualified for cutting 2 Strings, leaving Yumeko as the winner. Later, Terano meets with Kirari and both reveal that they have taken precautions against losing.
15	3	"Do Not Touch This Woman"; Transliteration: "Kono onna fureru bekarazu" (Japanese: この女触れるべからず)	Hitomi Ezoe	Teruko Utsumi	January 22, 2019
Yuriko Nishinotoin collapses and loses in a gamble with Miri Yobami and Miyo Inbami. Later, Batsubami introduces Miri Yobami and Miyo Inbami to Yumeko as they have all been invited to an "election battle" and Yumeko relishes the challenge. Runa Yomozuki welcomes them and Suzui also joins the Nym Type Zero game. Meanwhile Ririka Momobami offers Mary Saotome the opportunity to win 100 votes, and if she loses she must join Ririka's campaign. Yumeko and Suzui are advanced "Serve" chips which guarantee 24 hours service to the student council. In the first round of Nym Type Zero everyone bets 30 chips, and Miyo loses the first hand. Meanwhile, Mary realizes Ririka is Kirari's twin sister and refuses to play. Suzui calls Mary when Yumeko collapses from poison applied when she met Miyo. Runa says she cannot intervene as the poisoning happened outside the game. Mary sits in for Yumeko, now also playing for the antidote and an additional risk of placing their finger on a poisoned needle if they fold or lose. In the second round, Mary tells Suzui to show his cards, and after he does, she bets 100 votes.
16	4	"Communicating Women"; Transliteration: "Tsūjiru onna-tachi" (Japanese: 通じる女たち)	Yasuhiro Geshi; Kang Tae-sik	Teruko Utsumi	January 29, 2019
The second round of the Nym Type Zero game begins. Miri Yobami and Miyo Inbami reflect on their past together as children where they developed their own secret communication technique. They use it to reveal their hands to each other, giving them a decided advantage. Mary instructs Suzui which cards to play, and they manage to win the round, forcing Miri to prick her finger on a poisoned needle. The third round begins and Mary bets 1 million and the others call. Mary then reveals that she knows the card distribution because Runa used the Gilbreath shuffle, preserving the order of the cards, beating Miyo and Miri who did not pay attention to the shuffle. Miyo then instructs Miri to lose, but she collapses from the poison just as she plays the card, forfeiting the game to Mary and Suzui. Later, as Yumeko recovers after Rei helped to inject the antidote, Mary decides that she must become president as Yumeko is too addicted to gambling and risking her life. Meanwhile the election gamble continues, with Kirari amassing a large number of voting chips and is about to be challenged by the Momobami clan.
17	5	"The Connected Woman"; Transliteration: "Kawaru onna" (Japanese: かわる女)	Kim Min-sun; Yūki Nishihata	Shigeru Murakoshi	February 5, 2019
A week after the start of the Student Council presidential election, Kirari is in first place and Yumeko is in 10th place with far fewer votes. Yumemi asks Yumeko to perform with her as the Dreaming Creaming Sisterz and bet against the fans, but the movie star, Natari Kawaru whose real name is Sumika Warakubami, arrives and challenges Yumemi and Yumeko to a three-part performance contest. In the first round, Yumemi and Yumeko, perform a pop song and dance routine. However, Natari performs a solo song a capella and wins by 92 to 08 votes, even though Yumemi had bribed a majority of the audience to vote for the Dreaming Creaming Sisterz.
18	6	"The Hollywood Star"; Transliteration: "Hariuddo Sutā no Onna" (Japanese: ハリウッドスターの女)	Norihito Takahashi	Shigeru Murakoshi	February 12, 2019
Yumemi is horrified that Natari won the performance contest and realizes that Natari must have paid a higher bribe to the audience. The next round is proposed by Natari and is called "Grin and Bear It: Death Macaron" where the test is to display no reaction when eating a hot, spicy macaron within a group of three. Natari guesses correctly, but Yumeko also guesses which of Natari's was the spicy one and the round ends in a tie. The final round is proposed by the Election Management Committee and is called "Soixante-Trois". The players can truthfully or falsely declare the playing cards they select as they try to guess when the real total adds up to 63 and the winner earns double points. Yumemi and Yumeko appear to not cooperate, and Yumemi is the first to pass, admitting that Natari's talents are far greater than hers. Surprisingly, Yumeko also passes, leaving Natari as the only player, but the total is over 63 and she loses, leaving Yumemi and Yumeko as the final winners.
19	7	"The Treacherous Woman"; Transliteration: "Uragiri no Onna" (Japanese: 裏切りの女)	Mie Ōishi	Akira Kindaichi	February 19, 2019
Yumeko challenges Terano Totobami to a gamble for Student Council presidential election votes and they agree to play a game called the "Greater Good Game" presided over by Rumia Uru. The game involves choosing whether to place coins in a Personal Bank Box for their own gain, or into a Tax Deposit Box which will increase coins for all players. The players agreeing to participate are Itsuki Sumeragi, Miroslava Honebami, Yumeko Jabami, Ibara Obami and Kaede Manyuda, and they deposit their coins in that order. Before the first round, Yumeko suggests that everyone places all their coins in the Tax Deposit Box, but after the first round, there are only 20 coins deposited which means that there is a traitor and the recriminations begin. For the second round, Yumeko suggests that each player deposit a set number of coins as she has written on pieces of paper, but after the round fewer coins are deposited into the Tax Deposit Box than was agreed, possibly indicating two traitors may be working together. The players begin accusing each other of being a traitor, until Kaede is asked by Itsuki who he thinks the traitor is, and he points to Yumeko.
20	8	"The Winning Woman"; Transliteration: "Makenai Onna" (Japanese: 負けない女)	Takashi Igari	Akira Kindaichi	February 26, 2019
Kaede explains why he thinks Yumeko is the traitor causing distrust among the other players, and so in round three only 15 coins are placed in the Tax Deposit Box. In the discussion following the round, Kaede and Yumeko proclaim that they will pay no tax, but after round four, 25 coins are placed in the Tax Deposit Box, the maximum possible. Kaede now believes he knows the traitors and nominates Miroslava Honebami and Itsuki Sumeragi, suggesting that they colluded by leaving notes in the deposit room out of sight of the other players which was not prohibited by the rules. He proposes that Miroslava, who has the highest number of coins, be eliminated and the others agree. After the fifth round, Itsuki is declared the winner with 45 coins and she wins 100 votes. As the bookmaker for the game, Terano Totobami has to distribute the votes, however before the game started, she made a third-party bet with Itsuki that Kaede would lose and she wins that bet, forcing Itsuki to pay 150 votes to her. In the aftermath, Itsuki withdraws from the presidential election as she was more interested in winning the game than becoming Student Council president.
21	9	"The Woman By Her Side"; Transliteration: "Hata no Onna" (Japanese: 傍の女)	Yasunori Gotō; Kim Sang-yeob	Hiroshi Seko	March 5, 2019
Election Committee Chair, Runa Yomozuki gives an update on the election, naming the top 10 contenders, with Kirari Momobami still in front with a long lead, Terano Totobami in second place and Yumeko Jabami in sixth place. Yumeko suddenly challenges Kirari to a gamble, but Sayaka Igarashi, who is in love with Kirari in addition to being her loyal secretary, violently objects, and challenges Yumeko to a gamble for their lives. However, Yumeko ups the stakes of the bet: they agree that Sayaka will bet her relationship with Kirari against Yumeko's promise to never gamble again. Kirari proposes the game of Tower of Doors and as an added incentive, Kirari proposes that the loser jumps from the fifth floor, also forfeiting their life. Sayaka and Yumeko agree. The game begins and Yumeko opens a door which leads nowhere. Then Sayaka opens a trapdoor and descends one floor, but defying logic, Yumeko then opens a door in the external wall.
22	10	"The Logical Woman"; Transliteration: "Ri no Onna" (Japanese: 理の女)	Hidekazu Hara	Hiroshi Seko	March 12, 2019
Runa Yomozuki theorises that many of the distributed votes are being held as proxies for some of the front runners. Meanwhile, Sayaka solves the trapdoor puzzles and descends to the first floor before Yumeko and retrieves one of the two lilies. On Yumeko's next turn she also arrives on the first floor. However, on the ascent, Yumeko reaches the top first, She had correctly guessed that the outer part of the tower rotated after she opened an outer door, and then used the central staircase to travel down and back up. Having lost by using logic rather than intuition, Sayaka opens one of the outer doors and jumps from the tower. Surprisingly Kirari jumps as well, grabbing Sayaka as they fall. They both survive, landing on a soft safety mat instead of hard ground. Kirari licks the blood off of Sayaka's forehead, and they embrace. Although Sayaka lost the bet, Kirari asks Sayaka to be her secretary again, explaining that she needs Sayaka, and that, as strangers, they can begin a new relationship.
23	11	"The Woman Who Bears the X"; Transliteration: "Batsu o seou Onna" (Japanese: ×を背負う女)	Takeshi Satō	Shigeru Murakoshi	March 19, 2019
Yumeko, Saotome and the other students receive invitations to a "Hundred Votes Auction". The only ones to accept the invitation are Yumeko Jabami, Ryota Suzui, Mary Saotome, Yuriko Nishinotoin, Midari Ikishima and Ririka Momobami. Yumeko completely ignores Midari Ikishima. Rei Batsubami is the auctioneer and Inaho Yamato is to be the Election Committee monitor. The bidding for the first lot goes quickly, with Saotome winning on a bid of 80 votes, however the unseen sponsor collected 130 votes from the bids. The second round goes to Nishinotoin, again with a winning bid of 80 votes. After the third round, Saotome realizes that Rei Batsubami is also bidding, and she forces Rei to stop bidding. However, Yumeko then suggests that Rei is both the sponsor and auctioneer which is apparently not against the rules. Yumeko then has three billion yen brought into the room, and challenges the real Rei Batsubami to an all-or-nothing gamble, and Rei accepts, removing her glasses, wig and gloves to reveal her true self.
24	12	"The Null Woman"; Transliteration: "Rei no Onna" (Japanese: 零の女)	Kiyoshi Matsuda	Yasuko Kobayashi	March 26, 2019
Rei Batsubami retells when she was a servant treated like livestock by the Monobami clan and she received kindness from a lady visitor, implied to be Yumeko's sister. The woman was eventually destroyed gambling with the clan and Rei swore revenge on them. Now in the present, Rei declare that she will win the Student Council presidential election and become head of the Momobami clan. After she reveals that she is using hundreds of votes collected from non-competitive students betting on whether she would win the election, the game continues. In the next round, the competitors realize that they must continue at the risk of losing all the votes already bid and Yuriko Nishinotoin wins with a bid of 99 votes. Yumeko relishes what appears to be a no-win situation. In the succeeding rounds Yumeko quickly bids 101, winning the bids and intimidating the other players. She next bids 1 vote, winning 100 votes from Rei, more than covering her losses. The other competitors realize her strategy, and each bids 1 vote on succeeding rounds until Rei loses all her votes. Yumeko then suggests that she still has heart, and they bet everything they have on one gamble, Rei's three billion yen against the Jabami name on the toss of a coin. Yumeko wins the coin toss, but Kirari is fascinated by Rei's bravery and resolve and personally frees her of the Batsubami name and status, and allows Rei to pick out a new -bami surname for herself.
