= Oblivion Battery =

Japanese manga series

- First tankōbon volume cover

忘却バッテリー (Bōkyaku Batterī)
- Genre: Sports (Baseball)
- Manga
- Written by: Eko Mikawa
- Published by: Shueisha
- Imprint: Jump Comics+
- Magazine: Shōnen Jump+
- Original run: April 26, 2018 – present
- Volumes: 23
- Original net animation
- Directed by: Parako Shinohara
- Studio: MAPPA
- Released: October 11, 2020
- Runtime: 20 minutes
- Anime television series
- Directed by: Makoto Nakazono
- Written by: Michiko Yokote
- Music by: Tomoki Kikuya; Hiroko Yamasaki
- Studio: MAPPA
- Licensed by: Crunchyroll; EA/SEA: Medialink
- Original network: TXN (TV Tokyo), AT-X
- Original run: April 10, 2024 – present
- Episodes: 12
- icon

Oblivion Battery (Japanese: 忘却バッテリー, Hepburn: Bōkyaku Batterī) is a Japanese manga series written and illustrated by Eko Mikawa. It has been serialized via Shueisha's online manga app Shōnen Jump+ since April 2018, and has been collected in 23 tankōbon volumes as of January 2026. An original net animation (ONA) adaptation produced by MAPPA streamed in October 2020 as part of the Jump Special Anime Festa 2020 online event. An anime television series, also by MAPPA, aired from April to July 2024. A second season is set to premiere in 2027.

== Plot ==
In the world of middle school baseball, Haruka Kiyomine and Kei Kaname are the genius battery who were once feared by everyone. This includes Taro Yamada, who after competing and losing to them, decided to quit baseball and go to Kotesashi High School, a school with no baseball club. However to his surprise, he encounters Haruka and Kei and discovers that Kei suffers from amnesia — losing all memory of playing baseball and is refusing to play again. Joining the newly established baseball club, Taro and Haruka decide to bring Kei back to baseball by showing him the fun of it. They are also joined by Aoi Todo and Shunpei Chihaya, two other genius baseball players who had also quit baseball after getting crushed by Haruka and Kei. The five begin once again living their baseball life.

== Characters ==
=== Kotesashi High baseball team ===
Haruka Kiyomine (清峰 葉流火, Kiyomine Haruka)
Voiced by: Yoshimasa Hosoya (ONA), Toshiki Masuda (TV series)
A genius pitcher whose pitch reached a top speed of 148 km/h on a sharp, curving slider. Despite this he is only interested in "throwing the ball" and "playing baseball with Kei," relying almost entirely on Kei for training, health management, and team communication. After Kei lost his memories, Haruka turned down offers from prestigious schools and followed Kei to Kotesashi High School.
Kei Kaname (要 圭, Kaname Kei)
Voiced by: Mamoru Miyano (ONA and TV series)
Kei is Haruka's childhood friend who was once a genius right-handed catcher and left-handed batter who led the team to victory with his calm and collected leadership, but due to memory loss he lost both his knowledge and interest in baseball, and has somehow become a playful, perverted person. His memories occasionally returns to his former self. It is later revealed that this change is not a memory issue but caused by split personality.
Taro Yamada (山田 太郎, Yamada Tarō)
Voiced by: Jun Fukuyama (ONA), Yuki Kaji (TV series)
The everyman as well the narrator for the most part of the story. In middle school, after realizing his own mediocre talent in a match against Haruka and Kei, Taro decided to quit baseball and enrolled to Kotesashi High School. Taro is sensible and gentle, but often makes harsh remarks about Kei's behavior in his monologue.
Shunpei Chihaya (千早 瞬平, Chihaya Shunpei)
Voiced by: Yoshitsugu Matsuoka (ONA), Nobunaga Shimazaki (TV series)
A second baseman with excellent batting eye, bat control, and speed. In middle school, he worked hard to make up for his undersized physique with technique and theory, but after a match against Haruka and Kei, he was confronted with his own weaknesses and quit baseball. He considered baseball a waste of time and enrolled at Kotesashi High School.
Aoi Todo (藤堂 葵, Aoi Tōdō)
Voiced by: Tatsuhisa Suzuki (ONA), Yōhei Azakami (TV series)
A shortstop with a powerful arm and hit. In middle school, a mistake he made while playing against Haruka and Kei's team led to yips, which prevented him from throwing to first base. He decided to quit baseball and enrolled to Kotesashi High School. Although he appears to be rough and confident, deep down he is an earnest person. At Kei's suggestion, he dealt with his yips by throwing the ball back with one bounce and ultimately overcame it during the summer game against Teitoku in his first year. In his second year, he became the fourth batter.
Kazuki Tsuchiya (土屋 和季, Tsuchiya Kazuki)
Voiced by: Yoshitaka Yamaya (TV series)
A former softball player. He's not physically strong, but his speed rivals Chihaya's. Having struggled to fit into the "baseball club" system in middle school, he escaped into fictional "baseball" in games and anime, but nevertheless still loves the sport itself. He lacks hitting power, but in the game against Teitoku, he teamed up with Chihaya, who bats first, to pull off a double steal using his speed.

=== Others ===
Eiichiro Kokuto (国都 英一郎, Kokuto Eiichirō)
Voiced by: Takeo Ōtsuka (TV series)
Hironobu Makita (巻田 広伸, Makita Hironobu)
Voiced by: Mark Ishii (TV series)
Shuto Kirishima (桐島 秋斗, Kirishima Shūto)
Voiced by: Kengo Kawanishi (TV series)

== Media ==
=== Manga ===
Oblivion Battery is written and illustrated by Eko Mikawa. The series began in Shueisha's Shōnen Jump+ online manga app on April 26, 2018. Shueisha has compiled its chapters into individual tankōbon volumes. The first volume was released on September 4, 2018. As of January 5, 2026, 23 volumes have been released.

==== Volumes ====
No.	Release date	ISBN
1	September 4, 2018	978-4-08-881603-6
2	December 4, 2018	978-4-08-881688-3
3	March 4, 2019	978-4-08-881765-1
4	June 4, 2019	978-4-08-882013-2
5	August 2, 2019	978-4-08-882026-2
6	December 4, 2019	978-4-08-882147-4
7	May 13, 2020	978-4-08-882308-9
8	September 4, 2020	978-4-08-882451-2
9	March 4, 2021	978-4-08-882617-2
10	June 4, 2021	978-4-08-882699-8
11	August 4, 2021	978-4-08-882739-1
12	January 4, 2022	978-4-08-882887-9
13	May 2, 2022	978-4-08-883123-7
14	September 2, 2022	978-4-08-883252-4
15	March 3, 2023	978-4-08-883442-9
16	August 4, 2023	978-4-08-883617-1
17	January 4, 2024	978-4-08-883760-4
18	June 4, 2024	978-4-08-884055-0
19	September 4, 2024	978-4-08-884184-7
20	December 4, 2024	978-4-08-884326-1
21	April 4, 2025	978-4-08-884473-2
22	October 3, 2025	978-4-08-884717-7
23	January 5, 2026	978-4-08-884802-0
24	August 4, 2026	978-4-08-885172-3

=== Anime ===
==== Original net animation ====
The 40th issue of Shueisha's Weekly Shōnen Jump released on September 7, 2020, announced that the series would be adapted into an original net anime (ONA) as part of the Jump Special Anime Festa 2020 online event. The ONA is animated by MAPPA and directed by Parako Shinohara, with Noriko Itou as character designer and chief animation director, and Hisako Akagi as art director. It was streamed as part of the event on October 11, 2020.

==== TV series ====
An anime television series adaptation was announced on August 3, 2023. It is produced by MAPPA, and directed by Makoto Nakazono, with assistant direction by Takeshi Iida, scripts written by Michiko Yokote, characters designed by Hitomi Hasegawa, and music composed by Tomoki Kikuya and Hiroko Yamasaki. The series aired from April 10 to July 3, 2024, on TV Tokyo and its affiliates. (Note: TV Tokyo listed the series premiere on April 9, 2024 at 24:00, which is effectively April 10 at midnight JST.) The opening theme song is "Lilac", performed by Mrs. Green Apple, and the ending theme song is "Wasurena Uta" (忘レナ唄), performed by Macaroni Enpitsu. Crunchyroll licensed the series. Medialink licensed the series in East, Southeast Asia and Oceania (except Australia and New Zealand), and is streaming it on its Ani-One Asia YouTube channel.

A second season of the anime series was announced on November 10, 2024. It is set to premiere in 2027.

===== Episodes =====
No.	Title (Note: All English titles are taken from Crunchyroll.)	Directed by (Note: Information is taken from the ending credits of each episode.)	Written by	Storyboarded by	Original release date
1	"I'll Make You Remember"; Transliteration: "Omoidasasete Yaru yo" (Japanese: 思い出させてやるよ)	Masato Nakazono, Kento Matsui	Michiko Yokote	Masato Nakazono	April 10, 2024
2	"Wanna Play Together?"; Transliteration: "Issho ni Yaru?" (Japanese: 一緒にやる？)	Tsuyoshi Iida, Kunio Fujii	Michiko Yokote	Tsuyoshi Iida	April 17, 2024
3	"So What?"; Transliteration: "Dakara, Nanda" (Japanese: だから、なんだ)	Kentarō Kawajiri	Michiko Yokote	Kentarō Kawajiri	April 24, 2024
4	"I Won't Hold Back"; Transliteration: "Yōsha Shinaiyo" (Japanese: 容赦しないよ)	Issei Nagamatsu	Michiko Yokote	Junpei Takenata	May 1, 2024
5	"What Led Us To Quit"; Transliteration: "Yameta Kikkake No" (Japanese: 辞めたきっかけの)	Kazuki Yokoyama	Michiko Yokote	Ikuo Morimoto	May 8, 2024
6	"I Do!"; Transliteration: "Yaru!!" (Japanese: やる!!)	Tsuyoshi Iida, Kunio Fujii	Michiko Yokote	Tsuyoshi Iida	May 15, 2024
7	"Interesting Guys"; Transliteration: "Omoshiroi Yatsura" (Japanese: 面白いやつら)	Atsuko Nakagawa, Kentarō Kawajiri	Michiko Yokote	Kentarō Kawajiri	May 22, 2024
8	"3D Baseball Isn't Really My Thing..."; Transliteration: "Sanjigen no Yakyū wa Chotto..." (Japanese: 3次元の野球はちょっと…)	Yūma Suzuki	Rintarō Ikeda	Yūma Suzuki	June 5, 2024
9	"Who Do You Think You're Talking To?"; Transliteration: "Dare ni Mukatte Kuchi Kīte nda" (Japanese: 誰に向かって口きいてんだ)	Daisuke Tsumagari	Michiko Yokote	Daisuke Tsumagari	June 12, 2024
10	"Can't Run From Them"; Transliteration: "Nigerarenai" (Japanese: 逃げられない)	Hiroshi Kobayashi, Issei Nagamatsu	Rintarō Ikeda	Junpei Takenata	June 19, 2024
11	"I'm a Liar"; Transliteration: "Ore wa Usotsuki da" (Japanese: 俺は噓つきだ)	Masahiro Tokomaru, Momoichiro Masuda	Rintarō Ikeda	Masahiro Tokomaru	June 26, 2024
12	"Did You Hate It?"; Transliteration: "Iyadatta ka" (Japanese: 嫌だったか)	Masato Nakazano, Kenichi Domon, Kunio Fujii	Michiko Yokote	Masato Nakazono, Kunio Fujii	July 3, 2024

== Reception ==
The series took sixth place in the web manga category of the Next Manga Awards 2019. The series, alongside Dungeon People, won the Grand Prize in the "I Want to Read It Now" category of the 2nd Rakuten Kobo E-book Awards in 2024.
