= Kakegurui Twin =

Japanese manga series by Homura Kawamoto

- Cover of the first tankōbon volume, featuring Mary Saotome

賭ケグルイ 双－ツイン－ (Kakegurui Tsuin)
- Genre: Gambling
- Manga
- Written by: Homura Kawamoto
- Illustrated by: Kei Saiki
- Published by: Square Enix
- English publisher: NA: Yen Press
- Magazine: Gangan Joker
- Original run: September 19, 2015 – May 22, 2023
- Volumes: 15
- Television drama
- Directed by: Tsutomu Hanabusa (Note: Credited as Chief Director (総監督, Sō Kantoku).); Shinya Nagano
- Written by: Minato Takano; Tsutomu Hanabusa
- Music by: Michiru
- Original network: Amazon Prime Video
- Original run: March 26, 2021 – April 16, 2021
- Episodes: 8
- Original net animation
- Directed by: Yuichiro Hayashi; Kaori Makita
- Written by: Shigeru Murakoshi
- Music by: Technoboys Pulcraft Green-Fund
- Studio: MAPPA
- Licensed by: Netflix
- Released: August 4, 2022
- Runtime: 25–28 minutes
- Episodes: 6
- icon

Kakegurui Twin (Japanese: 賭ケグルイ 双－ツイン－, Hepburn: Kakegurui Tsuin) is a Japanese manga series written by Homura Kawamoto and illustrated by Kei Saiki. It is both a spinoff and a prequel to Kakegurui – Compulsive Gambler, which is written by Kawamoto and illustrated by Tōru Naomura. It was serialized in publisher Square Enix's Gangan Joker magazine from September 2015 to May 2023, with its individual chapters collected and published by Square Enix in fifteen tankōbon volumes as of July 2024. The manga has been licensed for English-language release in North America by Yen Press.

An original net animation (ONA) series by MAPPA was released in August 2022 on Netflix.

== Synopsis ==
=== Setting ===
Kakegurui Twin takes place a year before the events of the main series and the arrival of Yumeko Jabami at Hyakkaou Private Academy.

=== Premise ===
The series focuses on transfer student Mary Saotome who, after joining Hyakkaou Private Academy, learns about the school's gambling system and quickly begins to adapt to it, which only causes Mary to succumb to the gambling mania that she comes to be known for.

== Cast ==
Character	Japanese anime	Japanese live-action drama	English dub
Mary Saotome	Minami Tanaka	Aoi Morikawa	Kira Buckland
Tsuzura Hanatemari	Rina Honnizumi	Shiori Akita	Natalie Rose
Yukimi Togakushi	Yō Taichi	Minori Hagiwara	Morgan Berry
Sachiko Juraku	Yūko Kaida	Mijika Nagai	Amber Lee Connors
Mikura Sado	Aoi Koga	Mirei Sasaki	Suzie Yeung
Aoi Mibuomi	Seiichiro Yamashita	Hayato Sano	Aleks Le
Sakura Miharutaki	Rie Takahashi	Erika Ikuta	Anairis Quiñones

== Media ==
=== Manga ===
Written by Homura Kawamoto and illustrated by Kei Saiki, Kakegurui Twin began its serialization in Square Enix's Gangan Joker on September 19, 2015. It ended on May 22, 2023. Its chapters are collected and published by Square Enix into individual tankōbon volumes. The first volume was published on September 22, 2015, and fifteen volumes have been released as of July 22, 2024. The manga has been licensed by Yen Press for English-language release in North America.

=== Web series ===
A 8-episode live-action web series adaptation was released on Amazon Prime from March 26 to April 16, 2021.

=== Anime ===
In November 2021, it was announced that the series will receive an original net animation series adaptation by MAPPA. It is directed by Kaori Makita, with chief direction by Yuichiro Hayashi, scripts written by Shigeru Murakoshi, character designs handled by Manabu Nii, and music composed by Technoboys Pulcraft Green-Fund. The series premiered on Netflix on August 4, 2022. The ending theme song is "Queens Bluff" by Iris.

No.	Title	Directed by	Written by	Original release date
1	"A Girl Named Mary Saotome"; Transliteration: "Saotome Meari Toiu Onna" (Japanese: 早乙女芽亜里という女)	Kaori Makita	Shigeru Murakoshi	August 4, 2022
2	"A Targeted Girl"; Transliteration: "Nerawareru Onna" (Japanese: 狙われる女)	Yasuhiro Geshi	Shigeru Murakoshi	August 4, 2022
3	"A Traitorous Girl"; Transliteration: "Uragiri no Onna" (Japanese: 裏切りの女)	Tomohiro Furukawa	Erika Andō	August 4, 2022
4	"Confessing Girls"; Transliteration: "Kokuhaku Suru Onna-tachi" (Japanese: 告白する女たち)	Kyōko Yamazaki	Kōsuke Isshiki	August 4, 2022
5	"An Honest Girl"; Transliteration: "Jitchoku na Onna" (Japanese: 実直な女)	Takeshi Satō	Akira Kindaichi	August 4, 2022
6	"A Resisting Girl"; Transliteration: "Aragau Onna" (Japanese: 抗う女)	Yasuhiro Geshi	Shigeru Murakoshi	August 4, 2022

== Reception ==
Shaenon K. Garrity of Otaku USA commented how Kakegurui Twin is the perfect manga for "readers who are equally interested in introductory game theory mathematics and kink".
