= Dorohedoro =

Japanese manga series

- First tankōbon volume cover, featuring Caiman

ドロヘドロ
- Genre: Action; Dark fantasy; Science fantasy
- Manga
- Written by: Q Hayashida
- Published by: Shogakukan
- English publisher: NA: Viz Media
- Imprint: Ikki Comix
- Magazine: Monthly Ikki (November 30, 2000 – September 25, 2014); Hibana (March 6, 2015 – August 7, 2017); Monthly Shōnen Sunday (November 10, 2017 – September 12, 2018)
- Original run: November 30, 2000 – September 12, 2018
- Volumes: 23
- Anime television series
- Directed by: Yuichiro Hayashi
- Produced by: Hiroyuki Aoi; Daiki Tomihara; Yuito Hirahara; Akihiro Matsumoto; Masaya Saitou; Yoshinori Hasegawa; Yuuichi Tada; Reiko Sasaki; Atsushi Yoshikawa; Takehiko Hayashi
- Written by: Hiroshi Seko
- Music by: R.O.N ((K)now Name)
- Studio: MAPPA
- Licensed by: Netflix; Crunchyroll; SA/SEA: Medialink (S2)
- Original network: Tokyo MX, BS11, MBS (S1)
- Original run: January 13, 2020 – present
- Episodes: 23 + 6 shorts
- icon

Dorohedoro (ドロヘドロ) (Note: The title is deliberately ambiguous without context, and can be read multiple ways as a result. The only in-media use of the title appears in Chapter 56, where a viscous lake is described as "doro" (ドロ) and "hedoro" (ヘドロ), equatable to 'mud-sludge' or 'muddy sludge' in English. It may also be understood as 'mud to mud' when "he" (へ) is read as the particle "e" (へ), indicating direction.) is a Japanese manga series written and illustrated by Q Hayashida. It was serialized in Shogakukan's manga magazines Monthly Ikki (November 2000 to September 2014), Hibana (March 2015 to August 2017), and Monthly Shōnen Sunday (November 2017 to September 2018); its chapters were collected in 23 tankōbon volumes. Dorohedoro tells the story of the amnesiac reptilian-headed Caiman, working together with his friend Nikaido to recover his memories and survive in a strange and violent world.

In North America, the series has been licensed for English-language release by Viz Media in 2009, which began distributing the manga digitally when it launched SigIKKI, the now defunct online English version of Ikki magazine. The 23 volumes were published from 2010 to 2019.

A 12-episode anime television series adaptation produced by MAPPA was broadcast in Japan on Tokyo MX from January to March 2020. It was followed by a worldwide streaming release on Netflix in May 2020. A second season aired from April to May 2026. A third season has been announced.

== Synopsis ==
=== Setting ===
The series takes place in a post-apocalyptic urban setting, spanning three realms: Hole, an ungoverned human favela megacity, heavily polluted from magic waste; the sorcerers' world, an ethereal, Gothic class society, controlled by crime boss En; and Hell, the afterlife of all sorcerers, ruled by demons presided over by Chidaruma.

Despite similar outward appearance, humans and sorcerers are two distinct species; the latter were manufactured by Chidaruma in his realm, whereas the former occurred naturally in another. Sorcerers can also use magic through a circulatory system, which disperses a black smoke that gives them distinct powers. Stronger and rarer powers are highly prized, to the point of directly affecting social status; sorcerers will routinely commit to binding partnerships, resulting in violent competition for the right. Humans are forced to live in the slums of Hole, subject to unprovoked sorcerer violence and overwhelming magical pollution, whereas sorcerers live and travel freely between realms using conjured doorways.

=== Premise ===
A man named Caiman is searching for a sorcerer, whose magic erased his memories and gave him a reptilian head. Assisted by his friend Nikaido, a restaurant chef who runs The Hungry Bug, Caiman wanders Hole in search of his curser, hoping to kill them and dispel their magic. Caiman's only lead is the full-size man who lives down his throat: by placing a sorcerer's head inside Caiman's mouth, the man's head will slide up Caiman's throat and verify if they are responsible. Getting a job at a community hospital for magic attack victims, Caiman works with Drs. Vaux and Kasukabe to reach the sorcerer's world and uncover his past.

The news of a lizard-man killing sorcerers, one with cross tattoos and magical resistance, attracts the attention of the de facto ruling sorcerer En. En believes Caiman is tied to the Cross-Eyes Gang, which subjugated humans and lower-class sorcerers, and whose leader almost wiped out En's crime family before disappearing. En sends his cleaners, Shin and Noi, to kill Caiman with two low-ranking sorcerers: Fujita, who seeks revenge as Caiman murdered his partner, and Ebisu, who has amnesia after Caiman accidentally tore her face off.

== Characters ==
Caiman (カイマン, Kaiman)
Voiced by: Wataru Takagi (Japanese); Aleks Le (English)
Caiman is a victim of a magic attack that has left him with the head of a reptile and no memory of his original identity. He works with his friend Nikaido to hunt down Sorcerers who enter Hole, hoping to kill the one who cast the spell on him and nullify it. Caiman's immunity to magic and formidable knife skills make him incredibly skilled at battling Sorcerers. He also has the ability to regenerate his reptilian head, allowing him to survive lethal attacks such as decapitation. When not fighting, Caiman spends most of his time working at a hospital for magic victims and eating gyoza at Nikaido's restaurant, The Hungry Bug.
Nikaido (二階堂, Nikaidō)
Voiced by: Reina Kondō (Japanese); Reba Buhr (English)
Caiman's best friend, and owner and chef of the Hungry Bug, a restaurant in Hole. She found Caiman after his initial transformation and helps him hunt down Sorcerers in the hopes of returning his memories and face. She is secretly a Sorcerer herself, living in hiding due to the desirability of her magic type. She also maintains contact with a devil from her past, named Asu. Nikaido is an incredibly skilled fighter in spite of not using magic, typically utilising hand-to-hand combat and acrobatics to disable foes.
Professor Kasukabe (春日部博士, Kasukabe hakase)
Voiced by: Mitsuhiro Ichiki (Japanese); Griffin Burns (English)
A scientist who has studied Sorcerers intently for decades. He is approached by Caiman and Nikaido to use his artificial door to the Sorcerer's world. Although in his 60s, he looks incredibly young due to magic cast on him by his estranged, Sorcerer wife, Haru. He is frequently seen with his sidekick, a giant humanoid cockroach named Jonson.
Jonson (ジョンソン)
Voiced by: Ryōhei Kimura (Japanese); Joseph Whimms (English)
A giant cockroach living in the sewers of the Hole who was mutated by the residual smoke in the Hole's polluted water. Jonson originally belonged to another resident of the Hole who was hunting down magic victims, but is later adopted by Professor Kasukabe and rarely leaves his side from then on. Kasukabe is able to control Jonson using specialised frequencies and can even make him talk, though he is only capable of saying "shocking".
Vaux (バウクス, Baukusu)
Voiced by: Hisao Egawa (Japanese); Michael Sorich (English)
A doctor who runs a hospital catering to those who have been altered or "practiced upon" by the Sorcerers. He employs Caiman as an assistant. He is bald with a blue grid pattern tattooed on his face and the rest of his head.
13 (サーティーン, Sātīn)
Voiced by: Yūki Kaji (Japanese); Johnny Yong Bosch (English)
Neighborhood youth and regular customer at the Hungry Bug. He is attracted to Nikaido.
En (煙)
Voiced by: Kenyu Horiuchi (Japanese); Keith Silverstein (English)
The leader of the En Family and a business magnate in the Sorcerer's world, with a magic specialism themed around mushrooms. At a young age, En was sold into work slavery under an oppressive human regime; believed to be worked to death, his body was dumped and then taken to hell by a demon. Subsisting in Hell on mushrooms, En eventually grew strong enough to return to the surface, killing his oppressors and building a criminal empire. Eventually, coming under threat from a gang of humans with red cross tattoos on their eyes, En almost died in a battle with their leader. Fearing a resurgence of the gang, En begins seeking Caiman upon hearing of a sorcerer killer with cross tattoos.
Shin (心) and Noi (能井)
Voiced by: Yoshimasa Hosoya (Japanese); Sean Chiplock (English) (Shin)
Voiced by: Yū Kobayashi (Japanese); Cherami Leigh (English) (Noi)
Shin and Noi are enforcers for En. Shin, the child of a human father and a sorcerer mother, was raised as a human until his mother was murdered and his own heritage was discovered, leading to his father's death. In revenge, Shin murdered his way through the city's gangs before being found homeless and recruited by En. His magic allows him to disassemble victims into sentient pieces. Noi, En's younger cousin, is Shin's partner and best friend. She first befriended him after healing his necrotic arms and later forfeited her own training as a devil to save his life. Her own power enables her to heal injuries.
Fujita (藤田)
Voiced by: Kengo Takanashi (Japanese); Bryce Papenbrook (English)
Fujita is a low-level who works for a company headed by En. His partner was killed by Caiman. He is assigned to find the Sorcerer who transformed Caiman into a saurian. A bit of research reveals a reptilian transformation specialist named Ebisu. Fujita recalls passing her while in the Hole, and so he manages to locate and save her just as she's stuck in the jaws of Caiman. The incident leaves Ebisu traumatized, and Fujita watches after her while waiting for her memory to return.
Ebisu (恵比寿)
Voiced by: Miyu Tomita (Japanese); Cristina Vee (English)
Ebisu is sullen-looking teenage girl who wears a skull-shaped mask. While in the Hole, she runs into Caiman and Nikaido, who cuts off Ebisu's fingers to prevent her from using magic, and bites down on her head after removing her mask. Before he can withdraw to ask her his question, a frantic Fujita appears from a door behind her and forcefully pulls her out of his clamped-down jaws into the door, which results in the skin being torn off completely from her face. She is healed by Noi, but her head trauma caused some brain damage, as seen in her suddenly eccentric behavior. She is commonly seen with Fujita, for whom she harbors reluctant affection.
Chidaruma (チダルマ)
Voiced by: Shigeru Chiba (Japanese); Chris Smith (English)
The oldest and most powerful of the Devils, and the ruler of both Hell and the Sorcerer's world. A nigh-omnipotent being, Chidaruma is also the creator of the Sorcerers. In spite of his immense power and influence, he suffers from constant boredom, and thus seeks excitement and different ways to entertain himself.
Asu (アス) / Kawajiri (川尻)
Voiced by: Hozumi Gōda (Japanese); Todd Haberkorn (English)
A devil and close associate of Nikaido in the Sorcerer's world. He is later revealed to have once been Nikaido's adoptive elder brother.

== Media ==
=== Manga ===
Written and illustrated by Q Hayashida, Dorohedoro started in the debut issue of Shogakukan's seinen manga magazine Spirits Zōkan Ikki (re-branded as Monthly Ikki in 2003), released on November 30, 2000. Monthly Ikki ceased publication on September 25, 2014, and the series was transferred to the magazine's replacement, Hibana, starting on March 6, 2015. Hibana ceased publication after a two-year run on August 7, 2017, and Dorohedoro was transferred to Shogakukan's shōnen manga magazine Monthly Shōnen Sunday on November 10 of the same year. The manga finished after 18 years of publication on September 12, 2018, with its 167th chapter. Shogakukan collected its chapters in 23 tankōbon volumes, released from January 30, 2002, to November 12, 2018. A 14-page special one-shot chapter was published 17 months after the series's finale in Monthly Shōnen Sunday on February 12, 2020. Another one-shot chapter was published in Monthly Shōnen Sunday on April 11, 2026.

In North America, Viz Media began distributing the manga digitally in 2009 when it launched its SigIKKI site, the former online English version of Monthly Ikki. Its 23 volumes were released in print from March 16, 2010, to September 17, 2019. The manga was translated by the localization company AltJapan.

=== Anime ===
An anime television series adaptation was announced by Shogakukan's Monthly Shōnen Sunday in November 2018. The series was produced by MAPPA and directed by Yuichiro Hayashi, with series composition by Hiroshi Seko, character designs by Tomohiro Kishi, and music composed by R.O.N of (K)NoW_NAME. It ran for 12 episodes from January 13 to March 30, 2020, on Tokyo MX. (Note: Tokyo MX listed the series premiere on January 12 at 24:00, effectively January 13 at midnight JST) A series of six 5-minute-long original video animation (OVA) episodes was bundled with the series's second Blu-ray release on June 17, 2020.

A sequel streaming series was announced on January 9, 2024. The sequel was later revealed to be a second season, which was originally scheduled for 2025, but was later delayed. It streamed for 11 episodes from April 1 to May 27, 2026.

Following the finale of the second season, a third season was announced.

Dorohedoro was released outside of Japan on Netflix on May 28, 2020. The six short episodes were also made available on Netflix on October 15, 2020, as one long singular episode, labeled as episode 13. Crunchyroll added the first season to its catalog in March 2026 and also streamed the second season. Medialink has licensed the second season.

=== Other media ===
A concept album, Dorohedoro Original Soundtrack, was released by the label MHz on June 5, 2016. Hayashida commissioned 14 artists from across the world to create the musical companion piece to the manga. A databook, Dorohedoro All-Star Directory Complete Edition (ドロヘドロオールスター名鑑完全版, Dorohedoro Ōru Sutā Meikan Kanzenban), was released by Shogakukan on the occasion of the manga's ending on November 12, 2018. It includes character data and a newly drawn bonus manga story. An artbook, Dorohedoro Illustrations: Mud and Sludge (ドロヘドロ画集 MUD AND SLUDGE, Dorohedoro Gashū Maddo ando Surajji), was released by Shogakukan on February 20, 2020. It was designed by Shin Sobue and features 344 pages. Viz Media licensed Mud and Sludge and it is set to release on September 22, 2026.

== Reception ==
=== Manga ===
Joseph Luster of Otaku USA called the series a "weird title", but he said that the story "makes for some prime manga absorption". He called the artwork "rough and sketchy, but painstakingly detailed", comparing it to the art style of Kentaro Miura and Pushead. Bill Sherman of Blogcritics praised Hayashida's writing and her bold artwork with her "in-your-face action and punkish scratchiness". David Brothers of ComicsAlliance praised Hayashida's Dorohedoro for her ability to find the beauty in the grotesque and compared the drawing to the likes of Simon Bisley, Tsutomu Nihei, and Katsuhiro Otomo. Brothers continues, "It's gritty, but it looks great. Flipping through the book just to gaze at the art is almost as rewarding as actually reading it". Deb Aoki of About.com wrote: "Dorohedoro is violent and surreal, but it's also infused with Hayashida's dark and goofy sense of humor. Between their killing sprees, Caiman and Nikaido bicker and flirt like workin' class stiffs who appreciate a laugh and a good meal after a hard day at the office". On the other hand, Carlo Santos from Anime News Network criticized the series, saying that the story "never develops a sense of flow" and that Q Hayashida "cannot draw the human body at all".

=== Anime ===
The Dorohedoro anime series was nominated for the 2021 5th Crunchyroll Anime Awards. Lynzee Loveridge from Anime News Network praised the story, animation and characters, saying that "Dorohedoro somehow perfected the balance of mystery, absurd violence, and humor into a single hellishly beautiful package. The background artistry is a major highlight, especially the scenes around En's mansion and Sorcerer's world where highly detailed minutiae create something both beautiful and frightening. Absurdly funny, well-realized characters, a fleshed-out horrific world". Thrillist's Kambole Campbell wrote: "Dorohedoro hooks viewers with a wild premise and a unique, macabre world, but its staying power is in its cast of charming characters, as well as its numerous detours."

The Encyclopedia of Science Fiction described Dorohedoro as a "memorably amusing and bloody" anime, praising its fascinating artwork, imaginative worldbuilding and engaging ensemble of characters. It compared the series's nightmarish atmosphere to Alice's Adventures in Wonderland and the paintings of Hieronymus Bosch, highlighting its grotesque imagery, bizarre environments and casual treatment of extreme violence. The encyclopedia considered the plot relatively conventional, suggesting that it primarily serves to facilitate character interactions and exploration of the two contrasting worlds, while potentially incorporating themes of class conflict. It particularly praised the characters, including several antagonists, and the contrast between their friendly everyday interactions and the pervasive graphic violence and horror surrounding them.
