= Yuichiro Hayashi =

Japanese anime director and animator

- 林祐一郎
- Occupations: Anime director and animator
- Years active: 2001–present
- Known for: Garo: The Animation; Kakegurui; Dorohedoro; Attack on Titan: The Final Season

Yuichiro Hayashi (Japanese: 林祐一郎, Hepburn: Hayashi Yūichirō) is a Japanese anime director and animator. After joining an animation school at the request of a friend, Hayashi began working in the anime industry with Inuyasha in 2001 and later got his first role as director in 2012. Some series he has directed include Garo: The Animation, Kakegurui, Dorohedoro, and Attack on Titan: The Final Season.

== Biography ==
After graduating from high school, Hayashi did not have any specific career in mind to pursue. However, he was convinced by a friend to join an animation school run by Toei Animation. He later worked on his first series with in-between and key animation for Inuyasha in 2001. In 2012, he directed his first series with Pes: Peace Eco Smile, a series of anime shorts produced by Studio 4°C to promote Toyota. He was later offered by Masao Maruyama to direct Garo: The Animation at MAPPA, which he accepted.

Shortly after completing work on Garo: The Animation, Hayashi was approached by MAPPA CEO Manabu Otsuka, to direct Kakegurui, to which Hayashi agreed. Hayashi later directed Dorohedoro, which was nominated for anime of the year and best fantasy at the 2021 Crunchyroll Anime Awards. Beginning in 2020, Hayashi directed Attack on Titan: The Final Season, which was nominated for Anime of the Year and Best Action at the 2022 Crunchyroll Anime Awards. He was also nominated for best director.

== Works ==
=== TV series ===
- Inuyasha (2001) (in-between and key animation)
- Sōten Kōro (2009) (character designer)
- Garo: The Animation (2014–2015) (director)
- Kakegurui (2017–2019) (director)
- Dorohedoro (2020–present) (director)
- Attack on Titan: The Final Season (2020–2023) (director)

=== Films ===
- Batman: Gotham Knight (2008) (key animation)
- Halo Legends (2009) (mechanical designs)
- Welcome to the Space Show (2010) (art director)
- 009 Re:Cyborg (2012) (storyboards)
- Psycho-Pass: The Movie (2015) (storyboards)
- Garo: Divine Flame (2016) (director)

=== Web series ===
- Pes: Peace Eco Smile (2012) (director)
- Kakegurui Twin (2022) (chief director)
